= Brendan Cummins (Cork hurler) =

Irish hurler

Personal information
- Native name: Breandán Ó Coimín (Irish)
- Born: 5 September 1950 (age 76) Ballinlough, Cork, Ireland
- Occupation: Business owner
- Height: 6 ft 1 in (185 cm)

Sport
- Sport: Hurling
- Position: Centre-forward
Clubs
- Years: Club
- 1968-1978 1968-1981: Blackrock; St. Michael's
Club titles
- Cork titles: 4
- Munster titles: 4
- All-Ireland Titles: 2
Inter-county
Years	County	Apps (scores)
1971-1976	Cork	3 (0-00)
Inter-county titles
- Munster titles: 2
- All-Irelands: 1
- NHL: 2
- All Stars: 0

William Brendan Cummins (born 5 September 1950) is an Irish former hurler and Gaelic footballer. At club level he played with Blackrock and St. Michael's and was also a member of the Cork senior hurling team.

== Early life ==
Born and raised in Ballinlough, Cork, Cummins's family had a long association with Gaelic games. His granduncle, Willie "Bowler" Walsh, played for the Cork senior hurling team in the All-Ireland finals of 1912 and 1915 and later filled various roles with the Cork County Board. His father, Willie Cummins, won National League titles with Cork in 1939 and 1940. His brother, Kevin Cummins, captained the Cork minor hurling team to the All-Ireland title in 1964. Another brother, Ray Cummins, is regarded as one of the all-time greats of the game and captained the Cork senior team to the All-Ireland title in 1976. Cummins first played as a schoolboy in various juvenile competitions at Ballinlough National School before later lining out as a dual player at Coláiste Chríost Rí. He was part of the school's senior teams in both codes and captured a Harty Cup-Corn Uí Mhuirí double in 1968 before later winning the Hogan Cup.

== Club career ==
Cummins began his juvenile and underage career as a hurler with Blackrock while also played Gaelic football with sister club St. Michael's. It was with the latter team that he enjoyed his first major success by winning the Cork MFC title as a 14-year old in 1965. He later won three successive Cork MHC titles with Blackrock.

By 1968, Cummins had joined both clubs' top adult teams and was part of the St. Michael's side that won the Cork IFC title a year later. He enjoyed his first success with the Blackrock senior hurling team when the club made a clean sweep of Cork SHC and Munster Club Championship in 1971, before later lining out at corner-forward when Blackrock beat Rathnure in the 1972 All-Ireland club final. Cummins won a second All-Ireland club medal two years later when Blackrock once again beat Rathnure in the 1974 All-Ireland club final.

After losing the 1974 Cork SHC final to St. Finbarr's, Cummins claimed a third winners' medal in 1975. He was later a substitute when Blackrock won the Munster Club Championship and lost the 1976 All-Ireland club final to James Stephens. Cummins was also a member of the St. Michael's football team that lost three consecutive Cork SFC finals in 1976, 1977 and 1978. He was again an unused substitute for Blackrock's successful 1978-79 season.

== Inter-county career ==
Cummins began a two-year association with the Cork minor hurling team as a substitute on the 1967 All-Ireland MHC title-winning team. He earned a place on the starting fifteen as a dual player the following year and, after losing the 1968 All-Ireland MHC final to Wexford, he was at corner-forward on the minor football team that beat Sligo in the 1968 All-Ireland MFC final. Cummins continued his dual status when he was drafted onto both Cork's under-21 hurling and football teams in 1969. During his three seasons as an under-21 hurler he never lost a championship game as Cork won three consecutive All-Ireland U21HC titles in 1969, 1970 and 1971. Cummins also won an All-Ireland U21FC medal as a substitute when Cork beat Fermanagh in the 1970 All-Ireland U21 final.

Cummins earned a call-up to the Cork senior hurling team during their successful 1971-72 National League campaign. He was listed amongst the substitutes for Cork's opening games in the 1972 Munster SHC but was dropped from the panel of 20 players for the Munster final defeat of Clare and the All-Ireland final defeat by Kilkenny.

Cummins was on and off the Cork panel over the following few seasons, but earned selection during a number of games during Cork's successful 1973-74 National League campaign. He became a first team regular during the 1975 Munster SHC and was at centre-forward for the defeat of Limerick in the final. Cummins was again at centre-forward for the 2-21 to 4-11 defeat of Wexford in the 1976 All-Ireland final.

== Honours ==
Coláiste Chríost Rí

- Hogan Cup: 1968
- Harty Cup: 1968
- Corn Uí Mhuirí: 1967, 1968
- Frewen Cup: 1967

St Michael's

- Cork Intermediate Football Championship: 1969
- Cork Minor Football Championship: 1965

Blackrock

- All-Ireland Senior Club Hurling Championship: 1972, 1974
- Munster Senior Club Hurling Championship: 1971, 1973, 1975, 1978
- Cork Senior Hurling Championship: 1971, 1973, 1975, 1978
- Cork Minor Hurling Championship: 1966, 1967, 1968

Cork

- All-Ireland Senior Hurling Championship: 1976
- Munster Senior Hurling Championship: 1972, 1976
- National Hurling League: 1971-72, 1973-74
- All-Ireland Under-21 Football Championship: 1970
- All-Ireland Under-21 Hurling Championship: 1969, 1970, 1971
- Munster Under-21 Football Championship: 1969, 1970
- Munster Under-21 Hurling Championship: 1969, 1970, 1971
- All-Ireland Minor Football Championship: 1968
- All-Ireland Minor Hurling Championship: 1967
- Munster Minor Football Championship: 1968
- Munster Minor Hurling Championship: 1967, 1968
