= Dermot MacCurtain =

Irish hurler

Dermot Mac Curtain
Personal information
- Native name: Diarmuid Mac Curtain (Irish)
- Nickname: Der
- Born: 6 April 1957 (age 69) Blackrock, Cork, Ireland
- Occupation: Insurance representative
- Height: 5 ft 8 in (173 cm)

Sport
- Sport: Hurling
- Position: Left wing-back
Clubs
- Years: Club
- 1974-1991 1976-1979: Blackrock; St. Michael's
Club titles
- Cork titles: 4
- Munster titles: 3
- All-Ireland Titles: 1
Inter-county
Years	County	Apps (scores)
1976-1987	Cork	35 (0-3)
Inter-county titles
- Munster titles: 8
- All-Irelands: 4
- NHL: 2
- All Stars: 3

Dermot M. MacCurtain (born 6 April 1957) is an Irish former hurler and selector. At club level he played with Delanys, Blackrock and St. Michael's and was also a member of the Cork senior hurling team.

== Early life ==
Born and raised in Cork, MacCurtain first played hurling and Gaelic football as a schoolboy with Coláiste Iognáid Rís. He was a member of the school team that won the Dean Ryan Cup in 1974 before securing a Harty Cup-Corn Uí Mhuirí double in 1975.

== Club career ==
MacCurtain began his club career at juvenile and underage levels with the Delanys club on the northside of Cork city before transferring to the Blackrock club as a 16-year-old in February 1974. Success at underage level was immediate with Blackrock securing the Cork MHC title that year before later winning consecutive Cork U21HC titles.

By that stage MacCurtain had already joined the club's senior team and was a used substitute when Blackrock were beaten by St. Finbarr's in the 1974 final. He became a regular member of the starting fifteen the following year and was at right wing-back for the defeat of Glen Rovers in the 1975 final. MacCurtain overcame a facial injury to line out in Blackrock's successful Munster Club Championship campaign before later losing the 1976 All-Ireland club final to James Stephens. He was also a member of the St. Michael's football team that lost three consecutive Cork SFC finals in 1976, 1977 and 1978.

After losing the 1976 final to Glen Rovers, MacCurtain collected a second winners' medal when Blackrock overcame the Glen in 1978. He ended the season with an All-Ireland Club Championship title after Blackrock beat Ballyhale Shamrocks in the 1979 All-Ireland club final. Blackrock retained the Cork SHC title after a win over St. Finbarr's in the 1979 final, with MacCurtain being named man of the match after claiming his third winners' medal. After losing the 1982 final to St. Finbarr's, he won his fourth and final Cork SHC title after a win over Midleton in 1985. MacCurtain brought an end to his club career in 1991.

== Inter-county career ==
MacCurtain began his inter-county career as a dual player at minor level in 1974 and ended the season with two All-Ireland medals as Cork completed the double following defeats of Kilkenny and Mayo. He was appointed captain of the minor football team for their unsuccessful 1975 season before ending his minor hurling team tenure with a defeat by Kilkenny in the 1975 All-Ireland minor final. MacCurtain's progression onto the Cork under-21 hurling team was immediate and he was at left corner-back when the team beat Kilkenny by 12 points in the 1976 All-Ireland under-21 final. He was drafted onto the Cork under-21 football team in 1977, as the Cork under-21 hurlers ended the season with a defeat by Kilkenny in the 1977 All-Ireland under-21 final.

MacCurtain joined the Cork senior hurling team for the 1976-77 National League and played in all of the team's championship matches which culminated with a defeat of Wexford in the 1977 All-Ireland final. After securing a second successive Munster SHC title after a two-point win over Clare, he later captured a second successive All-Ireland medal after Cork's defeat of Kilkenny in the 1978 All-Ireland final. Cork's 1979 season ended with an All-Ireland semi-final defeat by Galway, however, MacCurtain ended the season with an All-Star having also claimed a third successive Munster SHC title.

MacCurtain was appointed team captain for the 1980 season and captained the team to the 1979-80 National League title before claiming a second league winners' medal in 1981. He was also acknowledged with a second All-Star during his season as team captain. MacCurtain brought his Munster SHC medal tally to five with consecutive defeats of Waterford in 1982 and 1983, however, Cork suffered consecutive All-Ireland final defeats by Kilkenny. He won a sixth Munster SHC medal overall after Cork completed a three-in-a-row with a defeat of Tipperary in the 1984 Munster final. MacCurtain ended the season with a third All-Star after lining out at left-wing back in the defeat of Offaly in the 1984 All-Ireland final.

MacCurtain won a seventh Munster SHC title in 1985 before bringing his overall tally to eight winners' medals after defeat of Clare in the 1986 Munster final. An injury sustained in a club match ruled him out of Cork's 1986 All-Ireland final defeat of Galway. MacCurtain's last game for Cork was a defeat by Tipperary in the 1987 Munster final replay.

== Inter-provincial career ==
MacCurtain's performances at inter-county level resulted in his selection for Munster in their 1979 Railway Cup semi-final defeat by Connacht. It was the first of five successive years in which he was selected for the team, with victory coming over Leinster in the 1981 Railway Cup final. After being left off the team in 1985, MacCurtain was recalled in 1986 to claim a second winners' medal after a win over Connacht.

== Honours ==
Coláiste Iognáid Rís

- Harty Cup: 1975
- Corn Uí Mhuirí: 1975
- Dean Ryan Cup: 1974

St. Michael's

- Cork Under-21 Football Championship: 1976
- Cork Minor Football Championship: 1974

Blackrock

- All-Ireland Senior Club Hurling Championship: 1979
- Munster Senior Club Hurling Championship: 1975, 1978, 1979
- Cork Senior Hurling Championship: 1975, 1978, 1979, 1985
- Cork Under-21 Hurling Championship: 1976, 1977
- Cork Minor Hurling Championship: 1974

Cork

- All-Ireland Senior Hurling Championship: 1977, 1978, 1984, 1986
- Munster Senior Hurling Championship: 1977, 1978, 1979, 1982, 1983, 1984, 1985, 1986
- National Hurling League: 1979-80 (c), 1980-81
- All-Ireland Under-21 Hurling Championship: 1976
- Munster Under-21 Hurling Championship: 1976, 1977 (c)
- All-Ireland Minor Hurling Championship: 1974
- All-Ireland Minor Football Championship: 1974
- Munster Minor Football Championship: 1974
- Munster Minor Hurling Championship: 1974, 1975

Munster

- Railway Cup: 1981, 1985

Awards

- All-Star: 1979, 1980, 1984
- Cork Hurler of the Year: 1979

Sporting positions
Preceded by Gene Desmond	Cork minor football team captain 1975	Succeeded by
Preceded by Tadhg Murphy	Cork under-21 hurling team captain 1977	Succeeded by Tom Lyons
Preceded by John Horgan	Cork senior hurling team captain 1980	Succeeded by Donal O'Grady
