= 1979 All-Ireland Senior Club Hurling Championship final =

1979 All-Ireland Senior Club Hurling Championship Final
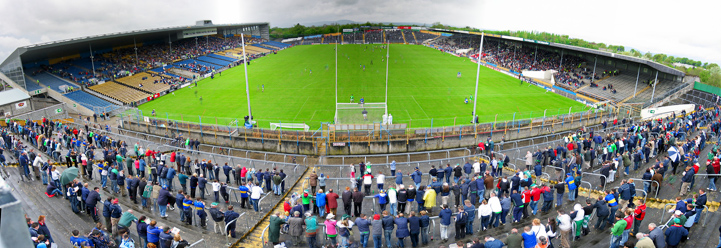
- Event: 1978–79 All-Ireland Senior Club Hurling Championship
Blackrock	Ballyhale Shamrocks
5-7	5-5
- Date: 25 March 1979
- Venue: Semple Stadium, Thurles
- Referee: Seán Purcell (Galway)

The 1979 All-Ireland Senior Club Hurling Championship final was a hurling match played at Semple Stadium on 25 March 1979 to determine the winners of the 1978–79 All-Ireland Senior Club Hurling Championship, the ninth season of the All-Ireland Senior Club Hurling Championship, a tournament organised by the Gaelic Athletic Association for the champion clubs of the four provinces of Ireland. The final was contested by Blackrock of Cork and Ballyhale Shamrocks of Kilkenny, with Blackrock winning by 5-7 to 5-5.

The All-Ireland final was a unique occasion as it was the first ever championship meeting between Blackrock and Ballyhale Shamrocks. It remains their only clash in the All-Ireland series. Both sides were bidding to make history with Blackrock hoping to become the first team to win three All-Ireland titles, while Ballyhale Shamrocks were hoping to claim their first title.

The first half was completely dominated by Blackrock who opened the scoring with a goal from a 21-yards free by Pat Moylan in the first minute. Two further goals by Ray Cummins in the 17th and 18th minutes put Blackrock ahead by 3-2 to 0-2. A third goal by Éamonn O'Sullivan helped them to reach half-time in the comfortable position of being 12 points ahead.

Blackrock appeared to have the game wrapped up when Tom Lyons whipped through a goal to leave them 14 points ahead with just a quarter of an hour left to play. Ger Fennelly pointed a free to reduce the deficit for Ballyhale, before Pat Holden, Kevin Fennelly and Liam Fennelly scored three goals without reply. Moylan pointed to reinforce the lead for Blackrock, however, a long shot from out the field landed in the Blackrock square before Brendan Fennelly got the final touch to send it over the line. The referee originally signaled a free to Blackrock, however, after consulting with his umpires he awarded the goal. This left the Shamrocks trailing by two points, however, they failed to score in the remaining time.

== Match ==
=== Details ===
25 March 1979

Blackrock	5-7 - 5-5	Ballyhale Shamrocks
R Cummins 2-1, P Moylan 1-3 (3f), É O'Sullivan 1-2, T Lyons 1-0.		K Fennelly 1-1, P Holden 1-0, L Fennelly 1-0, B Fennelly 1-0, G Fennelly 0-3 (3f), S Fennelly 0-1 (1f).

Semple Stadium, Thurles
Attendance: 3,000
Referee: S Purcell (Galway)
