= Ray Cummins =

Irish Gaelic football player and hurler

Personal information
- Native name: Reamonn Ó Coimín (Irish)
- Born: 9 November 1948 (age 77) Ballinlough, Cork, Ireland
- Occupation: Engineer
- Height: 6 ft 3 in (191 cm)

Sport
- Football Position: Full-forward
- Hurling Position: Full-forward
Clubs
Years	Club	Apps (scores)
1967-1981 1967-1970 1967-1969 1971-1982	St Michael's → UCC (SH) → UCC (SF); Blackrock	32 (9-46); 11 (7-21); 12 (3-08); 59 (49-74)
Club titles
	Football	Hurling
Cork titles	1	6
Munster titles	0	5
All-Ireland titles	0	2
College
- Years: College
- 1967–1970: University College Cork
College titles
- Sigerson titles: 1
- Fitzgibbon titles: 1
Inter-county
Years	County	Apps (scores)
1967–1978 1969–1982	Cork (F); Cork (H)	19 (4–58); 35 (18–46)
Inter-county titles
	Football	Hurling
Munster Titles	3	9
All-Ireland Titles	1	4
League titles	0	5
All-Stars	2	3

Maurice Raymond "Ray" Cummins (born 9 November 1948) is an Irish former hurler and Gaelic footballer whose dual league and championship career with the Cork senior teams spanned fifteen years from 1967 to 1982.

Born in Ballinlough on the south side of Cork city, Cummins was introduced to hurling by his father, Willie, a two-time All-Ireland medal winner with Cork in the minor grade. He developed his skills at Coláiste Chríost Rí while simultaneously coming to prominence at underage levels with the Blackrock club, before later playing with University College Cork. Cummins went on to enjoy a successful club career that spanned three decades, winning three All-Ireland medals, five Munster medals, and a total of seven county senior championship medals in both codes.

Cummins made his debut on the inter-county scene at the age of sixteen when he was picked on the Cork minor football panel before later joining the hurling panel. He was a Munster medal winner in both codes in 1966, however, All-Ireland success in this grade eluded him. He subsequently progressed onto the Cork under-21 teams, winning back-to-back All-Ireland medals as a hurler in 1968 and 1969. Cummins made his senior debut for Cork during the 1967-68 football league, before becoming a regular on the Cork hurling team the following year. Over the course of the next fifteen years, he used his physical attributes to telling effect by punching many fine points in football and "catching high" and delivering many winning scores in hurling. As a hurler Cummins is credited with redefining and revolutionising the full-forward position throughout the 1970s. He was, at first, seen as the antithesis of what a full-forward should be, however, he did use the skills and space that were available to him and, in time, he became a deadly marksman in front of goal. He won his first All-Ireland medal as a hurler in 1970, and added a second winners' medal to his collection in 1973 as a footballer before winning three hurling championships in-a-row from 1976 to 1978. Cummins also won a total of twelve Munster medals across both codes, including a remarkable eleven-in-a-row, and three National Hurling League medals. The All-Ireland-winning captain of 1976, he also collected five All-Star awards between 1971 and 1977 and is one of only four players to have won awards in both codes. Cummins played his last game for Cork in September 1982.

Between 1970 and 1980, Cummins lined out for Munster in several inter-provincial championship campaigns. He won a total of four Railway Cup medals across both codes.

Cummins has been repeatedly voted onto teams made up of the sport's greats, including at full-forward on the Club Hurling Silver Jubilee Team in 1996. At the turn of the century, he was included in the same position on the Cork Hurling Team of the Century, as well as the Munster and National Team of the Millennium. Cummins was also chosen as one of the 125 greatest hurlers of all time in a 2009 poll.

== Biography ==
Ray Cummins was born in Ballinlough, Cork in 1948. He was born into a family that had a strong tradition of hurling excellence. His father, Willie Cummins, played hurling with the Cork minor team in the 1930s. He captured back-to-back All-Ireland minor titles in 1938 and 1939. Cummins's grandfather, William 'Bowler' Walsh, played hurling with the Cork senior team in the early part of the century. He lined out in two All-Ireland finals in 1912 and 1915, however, he ended up on the losing side on both occasions. As a dual player, Cummins honed his hurling and football skills during street games in the 1950s on the Ballinlough Road, and later carried his skills to the nearby Blackrock and St. Michael's clubs. He attended Coláiste Chríost Rí where, along with his brothers Brendan and Kevin, he became part of the sporting success of the school. In the late 1960s, Cummins attended University College Cork where he studied engineering. Here he played on the college hurling and football teams, winning a Fitzgibbon Cup hurling title in 1967 and back-to-back Sigerson Cup football titles in 1969 and 1970.

Cummins currently lives in Kinsale and is a former employee of pharmaceutical giant Eli Lilly and Company. On 20 February 2007 he was profiled on the TG4 television programme Laochra Gael.

== Playing career ==
=== Club ===
After progressing through the juvenile ranks with Blackrock, Cummins was just seventeen years old when he experienced his first major success by winning a county minor championship medal in 1966. His subsequent enrolment at University College Cork made him eligible to play championship hurling and football for the college. Cummins was a member of a star-studded team that represented the college in both county finals in 1969. While the students faced defeat at the hands of Glen Rovers in the hurling final, Cummins won a county football championship medal as UCC defeated St. Nicholas' by 0-9 to 0-8.

In 1970 Cummins was at full-forward as University College Cork qualified for a second successive county hurling final. Mid-Cork divisional side Muskerry were the opponents and came close to achieving a remarkable double. UCC secured a narrow 2-12 to 0-16 victory, with Cummins adding a county hurling championship to his collection.

After graduating from University College Cork, Cummins returned to the Blackrock team where he became the first-choice full-forward in 1971. After success in the early rounds the Rockies eventually qualified for their first county final in eight years. St. Finbarr's were the opponents and took a strong 2-0 to 0-2 lead after just eight minutes. A torrential downpour before the game made conditions very difficult and tempers boiled over with Simon Murphy and Charlie Cullinane being sent to the line. Blackrock fought back and a Cummins goal in the 24th minute helped to level matters at the interval. Charlie McCarthy completed his hat-trick to give St. Finbarr's the lead early in the second half, however, Blackrock had a younger and fitter side. Cummins added a second goal in the second half as the Rockies secured a 2-19 to 5-4 victory. It was his second championship medal. After missing Blackrock's subsequent defeat of Moyne-Templetuohy in the provincial decider, Cummins was back on the starting fifteen for the All-Ireland final meeting with rathnure on 14 May 1972. The Leinster champions were in arrears by twelve points at one stage, however, they launched a stunning comeback to cut the deficit down to one point. Blackrock stubbornly held on to secure a 5-13 to 6-9 victory, with Cummins winning his first All-Ireland medal.

Blackrock surrendered their county, provincial and national titles the following year, however, they qualified for the county final once again in 1973. Reigning champions Glen Rovers provided the opposition and, after dominating the first half, held a 1-8 to 0-6 interval lead. Blackrock's lead was reduced to just a point by the 55th minute, however, they survived two Glen Rovers raids before securing a 2-12 to 2-10 victory. It was Cummins's third county championship medal. Newmarket-on-Fergus were the opponents as Blackrock reached another Munster final. There were never more than a few points between the teams throughout the match, with Newmarket spurning a goal chance just before the interval. Blackrock held out for a narrow 1-13 to 0-14 victory and Cummins collected a first Munster winners' medal on the field of play. The All-Ireland final on 17 March 1974 saw Blackrock and Rathnure renew their rivalry once again. Dan Quigley netted the first goal for Rathnure, however, Éamonn O'Donoghue secured Blackrock's first goal seconds later when he kicked the sliotar over the goal-line. Half-time saw the sides retire having scored 1-7 apiece. Donie Collins put Blackrock ahead early in the second half, however, Quigley soon scored his second to restore parity. A ten-minute period of dominance by Blackrock yielded only three points, while Quigley completed his hat-trick with a goal from a 21-yards free to give Rathnure a one-point lead. Pat Moylan secured the equaliser. The replay on 28 April 1974 produced a tension-charged climax as Blackrock turned almost certain defeat into victory. The first half saw a number of unsavoury incidents, with John O'Halloran (Blackrock) and Mick Mooney (Rathnure) becoming the first players ever to be sent off in an All-Ireland club final. As the game entered stoppage time, Rathnure held a one-point lead. Blackrock's Donie Collins sent in a ground shot which goalkeeper Michael Foley let slip through his legs. Éamonn O'Donoghue secured the victory with a goal in the second minute of injury time. The 3-8 to 1-9 victory gave Cummins a second All-Ireland medal as captain.

Once again back-to-back championship titles eluded the Rockies, however, they qualified for the county final in 1975. The game against Glen Rovers was expected to be an exciting affair, however, the expectation was not fulfilled. The half-back line of Frank Cummins, John Horgan and Dermot McCurtain closed down the Glen attack and contributed greatly to the 4-11 to 0-10 victory. It was Cummins's fourth winners' medal at county level. The subsequent provincial decider saw Mount Sion provided the opposition, however, Blackrock were in impressive form. Cummins scored 3-3 and collected a second winners' medal as Blackrock powered to an 8-12 to 3-8 victory. Blackrock entered the All-Ireland final on 14 March 1976 and got off to a great start as Éamonn O'Donoghue scored a goal inside the first minute. A goal from a Pat Moylan penalty in the 16th minute gave Blackrock a lead of 2-1 with James Stephens yet to score. The Village then made a vital switch as Joe Hennessy was moved from right wing-forward to right wing-back. By halftime James Stephens had cut the lead to five points as they trailed by 2-2 to 0-3. James Stephens was transformed in the second half with their full-back and half-back lines repelling the Blackrock attack. A draw looked likely as the game entered the final stage, however, a last minute Mick Leahy goal put the game beyond doubt as James Stephens claimed a 2-10 to 2-4 victory.

After defeat at the hands of Glen Rovers in 1976, it took Blackrock two years before they qualified for their next county final. Glen Rovers were the opponents once again, with the game remaining on an even keel for 40 minutes. Blackrock took over for the last period, winning the game by 4-12 to 1-7. It was Cummins's fifth championship medal. Once again the Rockies stormed through the provincial championship and defeated Newmarket-on-Fergus by 3-8 to 1-8 in the decider, giving Cummins a third Munster medal. On 25 March 1979, Blackrock faced Ballyhale Shamrocks in the All-Ireland final. The first half was completely dominated by the Rockies who opened the scoring with a goal from a 21-yards free by Pat Moylan in the first minute. Two further goals by Cummins in the 17th and 18th minutes put Blackrock ahead by 3-2 to 0-2. A third goal by Éamonn O'Sullivan helped them to reach half-time in the comfortable position of being 12 points ahead. Blackrock appeared to have the game wrapped up when Tom Lyons whipped through a goal to leave them 14 points ahead with just a quarter of an hour left to play. Ger Fennelly pointed a free to reduce the deficit for Ballyhale, before Pat Holden, Kevin Fennelly and Liam Fennelly scored three goals without reply. Moylan pointed to reinforce the lead for Blackrock, however, a long shot from out the field landed in the Blackrock square before Brendan Fennelly got the final touch to send it over the line. The referee originally signalled a free to Blackrock, however, after consulting with his umpires he awarded the goal. This left the Shamrocks trailing by two points, however, they failed to score in the remaining time as the Rockies won by 5-7 to 5-5. For the third time in his career Cummins had collected an All-Ireland medal.

Blackrock qualified for their seventh county championship decider of the decade in 1979. St. Finbarr's provided the opposition in what was the sides' first final meeting since 1971. The Barr's took a one-point lead in the 20th minute after John Allen struck for a goal. Blackrock responded with a 1-1 from Frank Cummins and Tom Lyons. St. Finbarr's missed two gilt-edged goal opportunities in the second half, as Blackrock claimed a 2-14 to 2-6 victory. It was Cummins's sixth winners' medal in the championship. He later claimed a third Munster medal following Blackrock's 0-13 to 1-8 Munster final triumph over Dunhill.

=== Minor and Under-21 ===
In the early 1960s, Cummins went for a trial with the Cork Under-15 hurling team and, in one of the major oversights of Cork hurling, a future star was turned away. He was subsequently accepted onto the inter-county minor hurling team. Cummins captured a Munster title in this grade as Cork trounced GAlway by 6–7 to 2–8. The subsequent All-Ireland final pitted Cork against Wexford. An entertaining game ended in a 6–7 draw, however, Wexford won the replay by 4–1 to 1–8.

Cummins later joined the Cork under-21 hurling team and enjoyed some more success. In 1968 he captured a Munster title in this grade following a 4–10 to 1–13 defeat of Tipperary. The All-Ireland final saw Cork take on arch-rivals Kilkenny. An exciting game followed, however, Cork were the victors by 2–18 to 3–9, giving Cummins an All-Ireland under-21 medal.

Cummins was eligible to play with the Cork under-21 team again in 1969. He won a second Munster winners' medal that year as Cork defeated Tipperary by 3–11 to 1–5. The subsequent All-Ireland final saw Cork take on Wexford, a team Cummins remembered from his minor days. A high-scoring game followed, however, Cork were the victors by 5–13 to 4–7, giving Cummins a second All-Ireland under-21 medal.

=== Senior ===
Cummins first came to prominence on the inter-county scene as a member of the Cork senior football team in 1968. The following year he became a dual player when he made his first appearance on the Cork senior hurling side. Cummins's first appearance was when he came on as a substitute in the Munster final trouncing of Tipperary. This win allowed Cork to advance directly to the All-Ireland final where Kilkenny provided the opposition. It was Cummins's first full game with the senior hurling team. It was a baptism of fire for the young hurlers as he was marking Pa Dillon, one of Kilkenny's most intimidating players. Cork took an early lead, however, after Pat Delaney was stretchered off Kilkenny came from behind to win the game by 2–15 to 2–9.

In 1970 Cummins captured a second Munster winners' medal at senior level as Tipperary were accounted for by 3–10 to 3–8. Cork later qualified for the All-Ireland final. Wexford provided the opposition in the very first eighty-minute championship decider. The game saw a record 64-point score line for both teams as Cork's Eddie O'Brien scored a hat-trick of goals to give Cork a considerable lead. At full-time Cork were the winners by 6–21 to 5–10, giving Cummins his first senior All-Ireland winners' medal.

In 1971 Cork's hurlers failed, however, the footballers emerged from the wilderness. Cork defeated Kerry by 0–25 to 0–14 in the provincial final, giving Cummins his first Munster football medal. Cork were later defeated by eventual champions Offaly in the All-Ireland semi-final. Cummins's skill as an all-round hurling and football star was acknowledged at the end of 1971 when he was picked on both inaugural All-Star teams.

A return to hurling in 1972 saw Cummins win his first National Hurling League title following a narrow win over Limerick. The success continued later that year as Cork trounced Clare by 6–18 to 2–8, giving Cummins a third Munster winners' medal. Cummins later lined out in a third All-Ireland final in four years, with Kilkenny providing the opposition for a second time. In one of the classic All-Ireland finals, he scored two goals in that game to put Cork in the driving seat. With time running out Kilkenny were eight points in arrears, however, one of the most amazing reversals of fortune took place. 'The Cats' fought back and finished seven points ahead on a score line of 3–24 to 5–11. It was a bitter All-Ireland defeat for Cummins, his second at the hands of Kilkenny.

In 1973 Cummins turned his attentions back to football, winning a second Munster title following a 5–12 to 1–15 victory over great rivals Kerry. The team later qualified for the All-Ireland final with Galway providing the opposition. Teenager Jimmy Barry-Murphy scored the first of his two goals after just two minutes to set the tone. Cork had a reasonably comfortable 3–17 to 2–13 victory and Cummins became only the tenth player in the history of Gaelic games to win senior All-Ireland medals in both hurling and football.

In 1974 the Cork hurling team bounced back somewhat with Cummins capturing a second National League winners' medal after a defeat of Limerick. He later added a third Munster football winners' medal to his collection as Kerry were accounted for once again. While Cork were the favourites to retain the All-Ireland football title the team's march to victory came to an abrupt halt when Dublin defeated them in the All-Ireland semi-final. It would be nine years before the Cork football would return to Croke Park.

1975 saw the Cork hurlers return to the big time. Cummins captured a fourth Munster winners' medal that year following the provincial final trouncing of Limerick. Cork, however, were defeated by surprise package Galway in the subsequent All-Ireland semi-final.

1976 saw Cork retain their Munster title with another huge 4–14 to 3–5 win over neighbouring Limerick. It was Cummins's fifth Munster winner's medal. This victory allowed Cork to advance directly to the All-Ireland final where Wexford provided the opposition. Both sides had high expectations. Cork got off to the worst possible start in an All-Ireland final and trailed by 2–2 after six minutes. Cork battled back, however, the game hung in the balance for much of the seventy. With ten minutes left, Wexford were two points to the good, however, three points by Jimmy Barry-Murphy, two by Pat Moylan and a kicked effort from captain Cummins gave Cork a 2–21 to 4–11 victory. It was Cummins's second All-Ireland winners' medal.

In 1977 Cork reached their third consecutive Munster decider with Clare as the opposition. 'The Rebels' got off to a great start with a Tim Crowley penalty after just seventy-five seconds. Clare fought back, however, Cork still defeated fourteen-man Clare by 4–15 to 4–10. A subsequent defeat of Galway set up a second consecutive All-Ireland final showdown with Wexford. Like the previous year the game turned into a close, exciting affair. A Seánie O'Leary goal, together with some brilliant saves by goalkeeper Martin Coleman helped Cork to a 1–17 to 3–8 victory. The victory also resulted in a third All-Ireland winners' medal for Cummins.

1978 saw Cork dominate the provincial championship once again. Clare provided the opposition in the second consecutive Munster showdown between the two sides. The game was a close affair and one which Cork could have lost. At the full-time whistle Cork still had a narrow 0–13 to 0–11 win to give Cummins a seventh Munster title. This victory paved the way for Cork to take on Kilkenny in the subsequent All-Ireland final. The stakes were high as Cork were attempting to capture the first three-in-a-row since 1954. The game, however, was not the classic that many expected. Cork were never really troubled over the course of the seventy minutes and a Jimmy Barry-Murphy goal helped the team to a 1–15 to 2–8 victory over their age-old rivals. This victory gave Cork a third All-Ireland title in succession and gave Cummins a fourth All-Ireland winners' medal in total.

In 1979 Cork were invincible in the provincial championship once again. A 2–15 to 0–9 trouncing of Limerick gave the county a record-equaling fifth consecutive Munster title. On a personal level it was Cummins's eighth Munster winners' medal. After this game, it looked likely that Cork were set for a fourth consecutive appearance in the All-Ireland final and the chance to equal the seemingly unbeatable record of four championships in a row. The All-Ireland semi-final saw Galway catch Cork on the hop once again. A 2–14 to 1–13 defeat ended the dream of four-in-a-row.

In 1980 Cummins won his third and final National Hurling League medal, however, it turned out to be the first time since 1968 that he didn't win a Munster winners' medal in either hurling or football.

Two years later in 1982, Cummins won his ninth Munster hurling winners' medal following a 5–31 to 3–6 trouncing of Waterford. At one stage of that Munster final game Cork were nearly thirty points ahead when Cummins got through on goal. He could have sent the sliotar into the net for a goal, however, in a sporting gesture, he handpassed it over the bar. The subsequent All-Ireland final saw Cork take on Kilkenny. 'The Rebels' were the red-hot favourites, however, Kilkenny surprised. Christy Heffernan scored two goals in a forty-second spell just before the interval to take the wind out of Cork's sails. Ger Fennelly got a third goal within eight minutes of the restart, giving Kilkenny a 3–18 to 1–15 victory. It was to be Cummins's last outing for Cork as he later decided to retire from inter-county hurling.

=== Inter-provincial ===
Cummins also lined out with Munster in both the inter-provincial hurling and football competitions and enjoyed much success. He first played for his province in 1969 as a member of the football team, however, Munster were trounced by Connacht on that occasion. The following year Cummins was selected on the Munster hurling team and played in his first inter-provincial hurling decider. After a 2–15 to 0–9 thrashing of Leinster, he picked up a Railway Cup winners' medal. Cummins was a regular fixture on the team over the next few years, however, success was difficult to come by in both codes. He did, however, win a Railway Cup medal with the Munster footballers in 1972. After five years of Leinster domination in the hurling competition, Munster broke back in 1976 with Cummins adding a second Railway Cup hurling winners' medal to his collection. Two years later a defeat of Connacht gave him his third winners' memento with the province's hurlers. Cummins continued to line out with the Munster hurlers until 1980, however, he failed to have any further success.

== Post-playing career ==
At the time of his retirement, Cummins had won every single honour in the game. He continues to support his club and county, however, he has had little, if any, involvement as a selector or coach. Cummins holds the distinction of being one of only four players to have been awarded All-Star awards in both hurling and football.

As a player with Blackrock in the provincial and All-Ireland club championships, Cummins's skill earned him a selection on the club championship silver jubilee team in 1996. Four years later he was given the ultimate accolade by his county, his province and the Gaelic Athletic Association. Cummins was named in the full-forward position on all three Teams of the Millennium. His inclusion as full-forward on the national Team of the Millennium, at the expense of Nicky Rackard, cemented his reputation as the greatest number fourteen of all time.

== Career statistics ==
Team	Year	National League			Munster		All-Ireland		Total	
Team	Year	Division	Apps	Score	Apps	Score	Apps	Score	Apps	Score
Cork	1968-69	Division 1B	—		1	0-00	1	0-00	2	0-00
Cork	1969-70	Division 1B	6	1-10	2	1-01	2	1-04	10	3-15
Cork	1970-71	Division 1A	7	8-03	1	2-00	—		8	10-03
Cork	1971-72	Division 1A	7	4-05	4	4-06	2	3-04	13	11-15
Cork	1972-73	Division 1A	2	0-00	1	0-00	—		3	0-00
Cork	1973-74	Division 1A	2	2-02	—		—		2	2-02
Cork	1974-75	Division 1A	—		3	0-07	1	0-01	4	0-08
Cork	1975-76	Division 1A	6	2-02	2	1-01	1	1-02	9	4-05
Cork	1976-77	Division 1A	—		2	2-01	2	0-02	4	2-03
Cork	1977-78	Division 1A	7	1-10	2	1-03	1	0-01	10	2-14
Cork	1978-79	Division 1B	2	0-02	2	1-03	1	1-00	5	2-05
Cork	1979-80	Division 1B	7	5-08	2	0-04	—		9	5-12
Cork	1980-81	Division 1B	—		0	0-00	—		0	0-00
Cork	1981-82	Division 1B	—		1	1-02	1	0-03	2	1-05
Total			46	23-42	23	13-28	12	6-17	81	42-87

== Honours ==
University College Cork

- Sigerson Cup: 1969, 1970
- Fitzgibbon Cup: 1967
- Cork Senior Hurling Championship: 1970
- Cork Senior Football Championship: 1969

St. Michael's

- Cork Intermediate Football Championship: 1969
- Cork Minor Football Championship: 1965
- City Division Minor Football Championship: 1965, 1966 (c)

Blackrock

- All-Ireland Senior Club Hurling Championship: 1972, 1974, 1979
- Munster Senior Club Hurling Championship: 1971 (sub), 1973, 1975, 1978, 1979
- Cork Senior Hurling Championship: 1971, 1973, 1975, 1978, 1979
- Cork Minor Hurling Championship: 1966
- City Division Minor Hurling Championship: 1966

Cork

- All-Ireland Senior Football Championship: 1973
- All-Ireland Senior Hurling Championship: 1970, 1976 (c), 1977, 1978
- Munster Senior Football Championship: 1971, 1973, 1974
- Munster Senior Hurling Championship: 1969, 1970, 1972, 1975, 1976 (c), 1977, 1978, 1979, 1982
- National Hurling League: 1969–70, 1971-72, 1979–80
- All-Ireland Under-21 Hurling Championship: 1968, 1969
- Munster Under-21 Hurling Championship: 1968, 1969
- Munster Under-21 Football Championship: 1969 (c)
- Munster Minor Hurling Championship: 1966
- Munster Minor Football Championship: 1966

Munster

- Railway Cup: 1970, 1976, 1978

Individual

- In May 2020, the Irish Independent named Cummins at number twenty in its "Top 20 hurlers in Ireland over the past 50 years".

Sporting positions
Preceded by Gerald McCarthy	Cork Senior Hurling Captain; 1976	Succeeded by Denis Coughlan
Achievements
Preceded by Billy Fitzpatrick (Kilkenny)	All-Ireland SHC winning captain 1976	Succeeded by Martin O'Doherty (Cork)
