= Brendan Cummins =

Brendan Cummins may refer to:

- Brendan Cummins (Cork hurler) (born 1950), Cork hurler
- Brendan Cummins (Tipperary hurler) (born 1975), Tipperary hurler
