= Kevin Cummins =

Kevin Cummins may refer to:

- Kevin Cummins (hurler) (born 1946), retired Irish hurler from County Cork
- Kevin Cummins (photographer) (born 1953), British photographer
