= Willie Cummins =

Irish hurler

Personal information
- Native name: Liam Ó Coimín (Irish)
- Born: 18 October 1921 Carrigtwohill, County Cork, Ireland
- Died: 30 September 1992 (aged 70) Old Blackrock Road, Cork, Ireland
- Occupation: Dunlops employee

Sport
- Sport: Hurling
- Position: Left wing-back
Clubs
- Years: Club
- Carrigtwohill; Imokilly
Club titles
- Cork titles: 0
Inter-county*
Years	County	Apps (scores)
1939-1940	Cork	0 (0-00)
Inter-county titles
- Munster titles: 0
- All-Irelands: 0
- NHL: 2
- *Inter County team apps and scores correct as of 23:02, 8 April 2015.

William Cummins (18 October 1921 – 30 September 1992) was an Irish sportsperson. He played hurling with his local club Carrigtwohill and was a member of the Cork minor and senior inter-county teams in the late 1930s and early 1940s.

== Playing career ==
=== Club ===
Cummins played his club hurling with his local club in Carrigtwohill and enjoyed some success.

=== Inter-county ===
Cummins first came to prominence on the inter-county scene in the late 1930s. He tasted success in 1938 when he captured a Munster minor title following a 9-3 to 0-0 trouncing of Kerry. The subsequent All-Ireland final saw Cork take on Dublin. A high-scoring contest ensued and at full-time Cork were the winners by 7-2 to 5-4.

Cummins was still eligible to play with the Cork minor hurlers again on 1939. That year he collected a second Munster minor winners’ medal following an 8-3 to 0-2 defeat of Clare. Cummins later lined out in a second All-Ireland final, this time with arch-rivals Kilkenny providing the opposition. Cork were the dominant force for the second consecutive year and went on to win the game by 5-2 to 2-2. It was Cummins’s second All-Ireland winners’ medal in the minor grade.

Cummins later joined the cork senior hurling team. He made some cameo appearances as a substitute in the 1939-1940 National Hurling League, however, he never became a regular member of the team.

== Family ==
Cummins is part of a Cork hurling dynasty. His wife's uncle, William "Bowler" Walsh, played hurling with Cork in the early part of the century. He lined out in two All-Ireland finals in 1912 and 1915, however, he ended up on the losing side on both occasions. Cummins’s sons, Kevin, Ray and Brenadan, all wore the red jersey of Cork at various levels from the 1960s until the 1980s. Kevin captained ‘the Rebels’ to the All-Ireland minor title in 1964. Ray captained the Cork senior team to the first of three All-Ireland titles in-a-row in 1976 while Brendan was also a key member of the team.

== Honours ==
- All-Ireland Minor Hurling Championship:
  - Winner (2): 1938, 1939
- Munster Minor Hurling Championship:
  - Winner (2): 1938, 1939
