= Willie Walsh (hurler, born 1888) =

Irish hurler

Personal information
- Native name: Liam Breathnach (Irish)
- Nickname: Bowler
- Born: 26 September 1888 Little Island, Cork, Ireland
- Died: 21 April 1964 (aged 75) South Infirmary, Cork, Ireland
- Occupation: Train guard

Sport
- Sport: Hurling
- Position: Corner-back
Club
- Years: Club
- Sarsfields
Club titles
- Cork titles: 0
Inter-county
- Years: County
- 1910-1916: Cork
Inter-county titles
- Munster titles: 2
- All-Irelands: 0

William Walsh (26 September 1888 – 21 April 1964) was an Irish hurler, selector and Gaelic games administrator. At club level he played with Sarsfields and was also a member of the Cork senior hurling team. He usually lined out as a corner-back.

== Career ==
Born in Little Island, Walsh first came to prominence as a hurler with the Sarsfields club in nearby Glanmire. He first appeared on the inter-county scene as a member of the Cork senior hurling team during the 1910 Munster Championship. Walsh was a regular member of the team over the following few seasons and won two Munster Championship medals. He also lined out in All-Ireland final defeats by Kilkenny in 1912 and Laois in 1915. Walsh's last game for Cork was the 1916 Munster final defeat by Tipperary.

== Post-playing career ==
Walsh was the Sarsfields representative on the Cork County Board for a number of years and was Cork’s Munster Council representative from 1931 to 1939. He was elected vice-chairman of the Cork County Board in 1937 before serving as chairman from 1941 to 1946 when he was defeated in an election at the County Convention. Walsh's tenure as chairman saw the Cork senior team claim five All-Ireland Championships in six seasons, including a record-breaking four-in-a-row. He was a selector for the title wins in 1941, 1943 and 1944. After being defeated for the chairmanship Walsh served one more year on the General Purposes Committee before standing down from his administrative duties.

== Personal life ==
Walsh's niece married Willie Cummins, who had also lined out with the Cork senior hurling team. His grandnephews, Kevin, Ray and Brendan, all lined out with Cork at various levels from the 1960s until the 1980s. The Cork Premier Intermediate Hurling Championship cup is named in Walsh's honour.

== Honours ==
=== Player ===
- Munster Senior Hurling Championship: 1912, 1915

=== Selector ===
- All-Ireland Senior Hurling Championship: 1941, 1943, 1944
- Munster Senior Hurling Championship: 1943, 1944

Sporting positions
Preceded by Henry O'Mahony	Vice-Chairman of the Cork County Board; 1937-1939	Succeeded by Séamus Long
Preceded by Henry O'Mahony	Chairman of the Cork County Board; 1940-1946	Succeeded by Séamus O'Shea
