= 1973–74 All-Ireland Senior Club Hurling Championship =

All-Ireland Senior Club Hurling Championship 1973–74
Championship Details
- Dates: 28 October 1973 – 28 April 1974
- Teams: 24

All Ireland Champions
- Winners: Blackrock (2nd win)
- Captain: John Horgan

All Ireland Runners-up
- Runners-up: Rathnure

Provincial Champions
- Munster: Blackrock
- Leinster: Rathnure
- Ulster: St John's
- Connacht: Castlegar

Championship Statistics
- Matches Played: 23
- Total Goals: 126 (5.47 per game)
- Total Points: 377 (16.39 per game)
- Top Scorer: Dan Quigley (4–42)

The 1973–74 All-Ireland Senior Club Hurling Championship was the fourth staging of the All-Ireland Senior Club Hurling Championship, the Gaelic Athletic Association's premier inter-county club hurling tournament. The championship ran from 28 October 1973 to 28 April 1974.

Glen Rovers of Cork were the defending champions, however, they failed to qualify after being beaten by Blackrock in the 1973 Cork SHC final.

The All-Ireland final, a replay, was played at Fraher Field in Dungarvan on 28 April 1974, between Blackrock of Cork and Rathnure of Wexford, in what was a first championship meeting between the teams in two years. Blackrock won the match by 3–08 to 1–09 and became the first team to win the title twice.

Rathnure's Dan Quigley was the championship's top scorer with 4–42.

== Connacht Senior Club Hurling Championship ==
=== Connacht first round ===
18 November 1973 First round	St Finbarr's	2–04 – 4–05	Ballinrobe	St Manchan's Park
	H Faughnan 1–0, G Keegan 1–0, J O'Donoghue 0–2, L Harte 0–1, M Doorigan 0–1.		M Murphy 1–1, P Malone 1–1, P McWaters 1–0, J Murphy 1–0, V Hughes 0–2, B Crowley 0–1.

18 November 1973 First round	Craobh Rua	3–02 – 1–12	Tremane	Corran Park
	C Lawlor 2–1, J Fitzgerald 1–0, M Lally 0–1.		T Healy 1–3, J Kilroy 0–6, M Kilroy 0–2, J Coyne 0–1.

=== Connacht semi-final ===
25 November 1973 Semi-final	Tremane	w/o – scr.	Ballinrobe	Athleague Sportsfield

=== Connacht final ===
3 March 1974 Final	Castlegar	7–08 – 1–07	Tremane	St Dominic's Park
	John Connolly 2-4, P Egan 2-0, M Mulryan 1-1, M Connolly 0-3, P Glynn 1-0, N Commins 1-0.		M Kilroy 1-2, S Kilroy 0-2, J Coyne 0-1, T Healy 0-1, J Kilroy 0-1.

== Leinster Senior Club Hurling Championship ==
=== Leinster first round ===
11 November 1973 First round	Carnew Emmets	2–06 – 2–08	Faughs	Aughrim County Ground
	S Brennan 2-5, T Sullivan 0-1.		F Dermody 1-1, J Ahern 1-1, C Muldoon 0-2, P O'Neill 0-2, S Gogherty 0-1, J Conway 0-1.

11 November 1973 First round	Ballinkillen	6–05 – 7–13	The Fenians	Dr Cullen Park
	S Nolan 3–0, J Clerkin 2–0, T Collier 1–1, Terry Byrne 0–2, Tim Byrne 0–1, Cyril Hughes 0–1.		B Fitzpatrick 3–4, P Broderick 1–4, W Watson 2–0, J Moriarty 1–0, P Delaney 0–2, M Garrett 0–2, G Murphy 0–1.

=== Leinster quarter-finals ===
25 November 1973 Quarter-final	Faughs	1–12 – 0–07	Ardclough	O'Toole Park
	P O'Neill 1–6, N Smith 0–2, C Muldoon 0–2, T Quinn 0–1, J Lyons 0–1.		N Walsh 0–2, J Walsh 0–2, T Christian 0–2, D Dalton 0–1.

25 November 1973 Quarter-final	Camross	2–02 – 1–08	St Rynagh's	O'Moore Park
	F Keenan 1–1, O Cuddy 1–0, S Cuddy 0–1.		B Moylan 0–5, PJ Whelehan 1–0, P Mulhaire 0–1, J Horan 0–2.

25 November 1973 Quarter-final	The Fenians	3–07 – 3–10	Rathnure	Nowlan Park
	B Fitzpatrick 1–1, P Delaney 1–1, J Moriarty 1–0, W Watson 0–2, P Henderson 0–2.		D Quigley 0–6, J Murphy 1–2, M Byrne 1–0, J Quigley 1–0, T O'Connor 0–1, M Quigley 0–1.	Referee: M Spain (Offaly)

25 November 1973 Quarter-final	Boardsmill	2–07 – 1–02	Raharney	St Loman's Park
	JJ Reilly 1-2, S Carney 1-1, D Fay 0-4.		M Flanagan 1-0, R Smyth 0-1, N Weir 0-1.	Referee: C Foley (Dublin)

=== Leinster semi-finals ===
20 January 1974 Semi-final	Boardsmill	1–11 – 4–08	St Rynagh's	Fr Plunkett Park
	S Carney 0–7, D Fay 1–0, V Guy 0–2, N Perry 0–1, TJ Reilly 0–1.		H Dolan 1–1, M Moylan 0–4, J Claffery 1–0, PJ Whelehan 1–0, S Moylan 1–0, J Woods 0–1, P Horan 0–1, JJ Devery 0–1.

20 January 1974 Semi-final	Faughs	2–10 – 6–12	Rathnure	Croke Park
	Paddy O'Neill 1–9, N Rea 1–0, J Conway 0–1.		J Quigley 2–4, J Murphy 2–2, D Quigley 0–4, V Fenlon 1–0, M Byrne 1–0, P Flynn 0–1, M Quigley 0–1.	Referee: S Rankins (Laois)

=== Leinster final ===
3 March 1974 Final	Rathnure	1–18 – 2–09	St Rynagh's	Nowlan Park
	D Quigley 1–15, M Quigley 0–1, J Quigley 0–1, S Murphy 0–1.		S Moylan 0–7, B Moylan 2–0, H Dolan 0–1, P Mulhaire 0–1.

== Munster Senior Club Hurling Championship ==
=== Munser quarter-finals ===
28 October 1973 Quarter-final	Newmarket-on-Fergus	6–10 – 3–07	Portlaw	Fr Murphy Memorial Park
	T Ryan 4–7, M Gilmartin 1–0, P McNamara 1–0, S Liddy 0–1, G McNamara 0–1, B Behan 0–1.		M Hickey 0–4, A Ryan 1–0, T Cheasty 1–0, B Kiely 1–0, T Russell 0–1, D Long 0–1, M Regan 0–1.

16 December 1973 Quarter-final	Kilmallock	0–09 – 2–03	Roscrea	FitzGerald Park
	T Smith 0-4, P Kelly 0-2, M Finn 0-1, D O'Riordan 0-1, M Carroll 0-1.		J Cunningham 1-1, J Tynan 1-0, F Loughane 0-2.

6 January 1974 Quarter-final replay	Roscrea	5–07 – 2–04	Kilmallock	St Cronan's Park
	F Loughnane 3–2, J Cunningham 0–5, B Stapleton 1–0, J Fitzgerald 1–0.		T Smith 1–2, M Dowling 1–1, P Kelly 0–1.

=== Munser semi-finals ===
11 November 1973 Semi-final	Newmarket-on-Fergus	4–07 – 2–07	Ballyduff	Fr Murphy Memorial Park
	T Ryan 2–4, M Gilmartin 1–1, B Meehan 1–0, G Lohan 0–1, DJ Meehan 0–1.		J O'Grady 2–1, J Bunyan 0–3, M Sullivan 0–1, MJ Quinlan 0–1, B Hennessy 0–1.	Referee: S O'Meara (Tipperary)

20 January 1974 Semi-final	Roscrea	4–08 – 5–06	Blackrock	St Cronan's Park
	J Cunningham 2–5, J Spooner 1–0, J Tynan 1–0, F Loughnane 0–3.		É O'Donoghue 2–0, R Cummins 2–0, J O'Halloran 1–0, P Moylan 0–3, D Collins 0–1, D Prendergast 0–1, T Murphy 0–1.

=== Munser final ===
17 February 1974 Final	Blackrock	1–13 – 0–14	Newmarket-on-Fergus	Bruff Grounds
	D Collins 0–5, P Moylan 0–4, B Cummins 1–0, R Cummins 0–1, D Prendergast 0–1, P Kavanagh 0–1, É O'Donoghue 0–1.		T Ryan 0–9, C Woods 0–3, M Kilmartin 0–2.	Referee: J Moloney (Tipperary)

== Ulster Senior Club Hurling Championship ==
=== Ulster semi-final ===
18 November 1973 Semi-final	St John's	9–07 – 2–02	Ballygalget	Mitchel Park
	M Gallagher 3-0, J Gough 2-1, A McCallin 1-4, K McFerran 2-0, D Armstrong 1-1, H McCrory 0-1.		G McGrattan 1-0, W Coulter 1-0, E mcGrattan 0-1, C McKenna 0-1.

=== Ulster final ===
Final	St John's	w/o – scr.	Kevin Lynch's

== All-Ireland Senior Club Hurling Championship ==
=== All-Ireland semi-finals ===
3 March 1974 Semi-final	Blackrock	5–12 – 1–05	St John’s	Cork Athletic Grounds
	É O'Donoghue 3–2, J O'Halloran 2–3, P Moylan 0–5, B Cummins 0–1, P Kavanagh 0–1.		H McCrory 1–2, A McCallin 0–2, S Burns 0–1.	Referee: P Johnston (Kilkenny)

10 March 1974 Semi-final	Rathnure	1–15 – 1–06	Castlegar	St Patrick's Park
	D Quigley 0–5, Séamus Murphy 1–1, J Murphy 0–3, P Flynn 0–2, J Mooney 0–1, M Byrne 0–1, Seán Murphy 0–1, T O'Connor 0–1.		N Cummins 1–2, J Connolly 0–2, T Murphy 0–1, M Connolly 0–1.	Referee: N Dalton (Waterford)

=== All-Ireland final ===
17 March 1974 Final	Blackrock	2–14 – 3–11	Rathnure	Croke Park
	P Moylan 0–8, É O'Donoghue 1–1, D Collins 1–1, D Prendergast 0–2, R Cummins 0–2.		D Quigley 3–6, P Flynn 0–2, J Murphy 0–2, J Quigley 0–1.	Referee: P Johnson (Kilkenny)

=== All-Ireland final replay ===
28 April 1974 Final replay	Blackrock	3–08 – 1–09	Rathnure	Fraher Field
	E O'Donoghue 1–2, D Collins 1–1, R Cummins 1–0, D Prendergast 0–3, P Moylan 0–2.		J Quigley 1–3, D Quigley 0–6.	Referee: P Johnston (Kilkenny)

== Championship statistics ==
=== Top scorers ===
Rank	Player	County	Tally	Total	Matches	Average
1	Dan Quigley	Rathnure	4–42	54	6	9.00
2	Timmy Ryan	Newmarket-on-Fergus	6–20	38	3	12.66
3	Éamonn O'Donoghue	Blackrock	7–06	27	5	5.40
4	Paddy O'Neill	Faughs	2–17	23	3	7.66
5	Pat Moylan	Blackrock	0–22	22	5	5.40
6	John Quigley	Rathnure	4–09	21	5	4.20
7	Joe Cunningham	Roscrea	3–11	20	3	6.66
8	Joe Murphy	Rathnure	3–09	18	6	3.00
9	Billy Fitzpatrick	Fenians	4–05	17	2	8.50
10	Francis Loughnane	Roscrea	3–07	16	3	5.33

=== Miscellaneous ===
- Dan Quigley's tally of 1–15 for Rathnure is the highest-ever personal tally for an individual in a Leinster final.
