= 1964 All-Ireland Minor Hurling Championship =

All-Ireland Minor Hurling Championship 1964
All Ireland Champions
- Winners: Cork (7th win)
- Captain: Kevin Cummins

All Ireland Runners-up
- Runners-up: Laois
- Captain: Billy Phelan

Provincial Champions
- Munster: Cork
- Leinster: Laois
- Ulster: Antrim
- Connacht: Mayo

Championship Statistics
- Top Scorer: Charlie McCarthy (11-20)

The 1964 All-Ireland Minor Hurling Championship was the 34th staging of the All-Ireland Minor Hurling Championship since its establishment by the Gaelic Athletic Association in 1928.

Wexford entered the championship as the defending champions, however, they were beaten in the Leinster semi-final.

On 6 September 1964 Cork won the championship following a 10-7 to 1-4 defeat of Laois in the All-Ireland final. This was their seventh All-Ireland title and their first in 13 championship seasons.

== Results ==
=== Connacht Minor Hurling Championship ===
Final

11 August 1964 Final	Mayo	5-04 - 2-01	Roscommon	McHale Park, Castlebar
	Cribben 3-1, Kelly 2-0, Henry 0-2, Mulrinno 0-1.

=== Leinster Minor Hurling Championship ===
Semi-finals

5 July 1964 Semi-final	Kilkenny	3-05 - 2-03	Wexford	Croke Park, Dublin
	E Tallent 1-1, S Kinsella 1-0, T Brennan 1-0, J Crosby 0-1, T Houlihan 0-1, B Sullivan 0-1, T Murphy 0-1.		P Quigley 1-0, T Doran 1-0, B Tobin 0-2, W Curley 0-1.

12 July 1964 Semi-final	Laois	6-08 - 3-06	Dublin	O'Moore Park, Portlaoise
	M Fennell 2-0, P Keyes 2-0, P Payne 1-2, B Delaney 1-2, P Dillon 0-4.		B Dalton 1-1, P Kennedy 1-1, D Noonan 1-0, L Deegan 0-1, M Kennedy 0-1, J Ruth 0-1, M Tutty 0-1.

Final

19 July 1964 Final	Laois	4-09 - 3-08	Kilkenny	Croke Park, Dublin
	P Keyes 2-0, P Dillon 1-3, P Payne 0-5, B Delaney 1-0, M Conlon 0-1.		B Sullivan 1-3, E Byrne 1-1, T Murphy 1-0, N Brennan 0-2, E Tallent 0-1, T Houlihan 0-1.

=== Munster Minor Hurling Championship ===
First round

24 May 1964 First round	Limerick	6-05 - 2-06	Clare	MacDonagh Park, Nenagh
	P Nash 4-4, C McCarthy 1-0, D Savage 1-0.		T Corry 2-1, P Coffey 0-5.

21 June 1964 First round	Kerry	1-05 - 2-09	Waterford	FitzGerald Stadium, Killarney
	J Purcell 1-1, B Twomey 0-4.		L Canning 1-1, M Power 1-1, D Mahon 0-3, S O'Dwyer 0-1, T Galvin 0-1, D Fitzgerald 0-1, J Byrne 0-1.

24 June 1964 First round	Cork	8-10 - 2-01	Galway	Gaelic Grounds, Limerick
	L McAuliffe 3-2, A Flynn 2-2, C McCarthy 2-1, K Cummins 1-1, D Clifford 0-2, C Roche 0-1, D Coleman 0-1.		J Rabbitte 1-0, K Hanniffy 1-0, P O'Toole 0-1.	Referee: J Sheehan (Limerick)

Semi-finals

25 June 1964 Semi-final	Tipperary	4-09 - 3-07	Limerick	Buttevant Sportsfield, Buttevant
	M O'Mahony 1-5, O Ryan 1-0, M Flanagan 1-0, A Spooner 1-0, M Loughnane 0-2, J Ryan 0-1, M O'Sullivan 0-1.		B Savage 2-2, T Clohessy 1-2, N Hayes 0-2, P Doherty 0-1.	Referee: P Cronin (Cork)

9 July 1964 Semi-final	Cork	6-15 - 3-04	Waterford	Clonmult Memorial Park, Midleton
	C McCarthy 3-8, M Kenneally 2-2, A Flynn 1-2, C Roche 0-2, K Cummins 0-1.		L Canning 1-1, D Fitzgerald 1-0, D Mahon 1-0, J O'Mahony 0-2, P Enright 0-1.

Final

26 July 1964 Final	Cork	2-14 - 2-09	Tipperary	Gaelic Grounds, Limerick
	C McCarthy 1-9, M Kenneally 1-0, L McAuliffe 0-2, K Cummins 0-1, D Clifford 0-1, C Roche 0-1.		M Mahony 1-1, PJ Ryan 0-4, M Loughnane 1-0, J Ryan 0-2, D Bourke 0-2.

=== Ulster Minor Hurling Championship ===
Quarter-final

24 May 1964 Quarter-final	Monaghan	4-05 - 7-03	Armagh	Emmet Park, Carrickmacross

Semi-finals

14 June 1964 Semi-final	Armagh	2-03 - 0-01	Donegal	Athletic Grounds, Armagh
				Referee: T Hall (Antrim)

14 June 1964 Semi-final	Down	0-04 - 3-04	Antrim	Páirc Esler, Newry
				Referee: J Phelan (Armagh)

Final

8 July 1964 Final	Armagh	0-00 - 11-11	Antrim	Lurgan
				Referee: E Devlin (Tyrone)

=== All-Ireland Minor Hurling Championship ===
Semi-finals

16 August 1964 Semi-final	Laois	14-09 - 2-02	Mayo	St. Brendan's Park, Birr
	P Keyes 7-3, D Conlon 3-1, B Delaney 1-2, P Payne 1-1, D O'Keeffe 1-0, L Purcell 1-0, P Dillon 0-2.		P Ryan 1-0, S Henry 1-0, T Henry 0-1, J Cribben 0-1.

16 August 1964 Semi-final	Antrim	2-04 - 7-09	Cork	Casement Park, Belfast
	B Whimery 1-1, O Kelly 1-0, M Kearney 0-2, J McCallan 0-1.		C McCarthy 2-2, K Cummins 1-3, A Flynn 1-2, L McAuliffe 1-0, D Clifford 1-0, B Wiley 1-0, C Roche 0-2.	Referee: J Duggan (Galway)

Final

6 September 1964 Semi-final	Cork	10-07 - 1-04	Laois	Croke Park, Dublin
	M Kenneally 3-2, C McCarthy 3-0, D Clifford 2-3, A Flynn 2-0, P O'Riordan 0-1, C Roche 0-1.		M Fennell 1-1, L Delaney 0-1, P Payne 0-1, P Dillon 0-1.

== Statistics ==
=== Miscellaneous ===
- Mayo won the Connacht title for the first and only time in their history.
- The All-Ireland final meeting between Cork and Laois was the first championship meeting between the two teams. It remains their only championship meeting.
