= 1975 Cork Senior Hurling Championship =

Annual hurling competition season

- Dates: 13 April – 14 September 1975
- Teams: 19
- Champions: Blackrock (26th title); Éamonn O'Donoghue (captain)
- Runners-up: Glen Rovers; Teddy O'Brien (captain)

Tournament statistics
- Matches played: 18
- Goals scored: 98 (5.44 per match)
- Points scored: 351 (19.5 per match)
- Top scorer(s): Paddy O'Sullivan (5-04); Pat Horgan (0-19)

The 1975 Cork Senior Hurling Championship was the 87th staging of the Cork Senior Hurling Championship since its establishment by the Cork County Board in 1887. The championship began on 13 April 1975 and ended on 14 September 1975.

St. Finbarr's entered the championship as the defending champions, however, they were beaten by Seandún in the quarter-finals.

The final was played on 14 September 1975 at the Mardyke Grounds in Cork, between Blackrock and Glen Rovers, in what was their first meeting in the final in two years. Blackrock won the match by 4–11 to 0–10 to claim their 26th championship title overall and a first title in two years.

Paddy O'Sullivan and Pat Horgan were the championship's joint-top scorers.

== Team changes ==
=== To Championship ===
Promoted from the Cork Intermediate Hurling Championship

- Bandon

== Results ==
=== First round ===
20 April 1975 First round	Imokilly	6-10 - 2-07	St. Vincent's	Páirc Uí Chonaill
	G O'Driscoll 2-4, D Buckley 2-1, D Farrell 1-0, Seán O'Farrell 1-0, Séamus O'Farrell 0-1, F O'Driscoll 0-1, P Keane 0-1, J Fenton 0-1, J Higgins 0-1.		D Linehan 2-3, T Virgo 0-2, P McNamara 0-2.	Referee: P Cronin (St. Finbarr's)

10 May 1975 First round	Sarsfields	4-07 - 4-10	Seandún	Ballinlough
	B Óg Murphy 3-5, T Murphy 1-0, E Kelleher 0-2.		K Keane 2-2, P O'Sullivan 1-2, B Meade 0-4, G O'Sullivan 1-0, W Murphy 0-1, E Murphy 0-1.

11 May 1975 First round	Cloughduv	1-06 - 5-15	Youghal	Riverstown
	G Nash 1-1, N Dunne 0-4, J Kelly 0-1.		M Butler 2-1, S O'Leary 1-4, D Cooney 1-2, R O'Sullivan 0-4, P Grace 1-0, F Keane 0-2, W Walsh 0-1, A O'Regan 0-1.

=== Second round ===
13 April 1975 Second round	Avondhu	0-06 - 4-10	Glen Rovers	Castlelyons
	E Flynn 0-2, J Dennehy 0-2, J Buckley 0-1, L Shanahan 0-1.		T Collins 1-2, F Cunningham 1-2, JJ O'Neill 1-1, R O'Mahony 1-1, P Harte 0-2, P Horgan 0-2.	Referee: P Cronin (St. Finbarr's)

20 April 1975 Second round	University College Cork	4-12 - 0-11	Mallow	Páirc Mac Gearilt
	P O'Keeffe 1-3, O Cussen 1-2, D McGovern 1-2, W Verriker 1-0, T Hegarty 0-2, J Fitzgerald 0-1, T O'Sullivan 0-1, M Dilworth 0-1.		T Sheehan 0-6, P Moriarty 0-3, P Buckley 0-1, P Shine 0-1.	Referee: T Daly (Lees)

20 April 1975 Second round	Muskerry	3-06 - 6-13	Carrigdhoun	Charlie Hurley Park
	S Noonan 1-5, T Noonan 2-0, T Ryan 0-1.		F Coleman 4-2, JK Coleman 2-5, G Hanley 0-3, T Fogarty 0-2, J Reynolds 0-1.	Referee: W Horgan (Brian Dillons)

26 April 1975 Second round	Nemo Rangers	2-07 - 0-07	Na Piarsaigh	Ballinlough
	N Morgan 2-2, J O'Leary 0-2, D Allen 0-1, D Calnan 0-1, K Murphy 0-1.		J O'Sullivan 0-4, V Twomey 0-2, R Whitely 0-1.

27 April 1975 Second round	Duhallow	1-04 - 6-18	Blackrock	Mallow
	B Buckley 1-2, R Quinn 0-1, T Mullane 0-1.		P Moylan 1-6, É O'Donoghue 2-1, B Cummins 1-2, D Collins 1-2, É O'Sullivan 1-1, P Butler 0-3, D Prendergast 0-3.	Referee: P Sheehan (Mallow)

11 May 1975 Second round	Bandon	3-09 - 2-09	Carbery	Ballineen
	J Fitzgerald 2-1, J Wilmot 1-0, N Crowley 0-3, R Wilmot 0-3, P O'Riordan 0-2.		T Crowley 0-5, S Kearney 1-1, P o'Leary 1-0, K Kehilly 0-1, S O'Neill 0-1, N Collins 0-1.

11 May 1975 Second round	St. Finbarr's	3-14 - 2-06	Imokilly	Church Road
	G O'Shea 2-2, C McCarthy 0-7, C Cullinane 1-0, J Barry-Murphy 0-2, G McCarthy 0-2, S Gillen 0-1.		G O'Driscoll 1-2, S Farrell 1-1, J Fenton 0-1, T Aherne 0-1, F Wall 0-1.	Referee: M Walsh (Mayfield)

18 May 1975 Second round	Seandún	4-10 - 3-06	Youghal	CLonmult Memorial Park
	V Twomey 2-1, P O'Sullivan 2-0, A Murphy 0-3, B Meade 0-2, D Keane 0-2, G O'Sullivan 0-2.		S O'Leary 2-0, P Grace 1-0, D Cooney 0-2, M Butler 0-2, W Walsh 0-2.	Referee: F Murphy (Blackrock)

=== Quarter-finals ===
11 May 1975 Quarter-final	Nemo Rangers	4-14 - 1-09	University College Cork	Church Road
	B Morgan 0-7, N Morgan 2-0, D Murphy 1-2, L Murphy 1-1, D Allen 0-4.		T O'Sullivan 0-6, P O'Keeffe 1-1, G Meehan 0-1, J Fitzgerald 0-1.	Referee: P Cronin (St. Finbarr's)

25 May 1975 Quarter-final	Glen Rovers	1-11 - 1-09	Carrigdhoun	Manning Park
	P Horgan 0-6, P Harte 1-2, T Collins 0-1, M Corbett 0-1, J O'Sullivan 0-1.		JK Coleman 1-0, G Hanley 0-3, T Fogarty 0-2, T Harrington 0-1, D Coleman 0-1, F Coleman 0-1, W Walsh 0-1.	Referee: D O'Brien (Cobh)

21 June 1975 Quarter-final	Seandún	3-10 - 4-05	St. Finbarr's	The Mardyke
	B Meade 1-3, P O'Sullivan 1-2, P O'Connell 0-2, W Murphy 0-1, V Twomey 0-1, J Crowley 0-1.		S Gillen 2-1, C McCarthy 1-1, J O'Shea 1-1, C Cullinane 0-1, G McCarthy 0-1.	Referee: F Murphy (Blackrock)

22 June 1975 Quarter-final	Blackrock	5-14 - 1-08	Bandon	Cloughduv
	É O'Sullivan 3-2, R Cummins 2-4, P Kavanagh 0-3, P Moylan 0-2, D Collins 0-1, É O'Donoghue 0-1, D Prendergast 0-1.		N Crowley 1-2, P O'Riordan 0-2, J Gabriel 0-2, R Wilmot 0-1, J O'Grady 0-1.	Referee: M Keane (Cloughduv)

=== Semi-finals ===
3 August 1975 Semi-final	Glen Rovers	4-10 - 2-09	Nemo Rangers	The Mardyke
	T Collins 2-0, L McAuliffe 1-3, F Cunningham 1-0, P Harte 0-3, P Horgan 0-2, JJ O'Neill 0-2.		D Allen 1-2, J Barrett 1-0, B Morgan 0-3, K Murphy 0-2, D Murphy 0-1, S Noonan 0-1.	Referee: F Murphy (Blackrock)

24 August 1975 Semi-final	Blackrock	1-18 - 2-10	Seandún	The Mardyke
	P Butler 1-3, D Collins 0-5, R Cummins 0-4, É O'Donoghue 0-3, P Moylan 0-2, P Kavanagh 0-1.		W Murphy 0-6, P O'Sullivan 1-0, G O'Sullivan 1-0, B Meade 0-2, D Keane 0-2.	Referee: P Cronin (St. Finbarr's)

=== Final ===
14 September 1975 Final	Blackrock	4-11 - 0-10	Glen Rovers	The Mardyke
	T Cashman 1-2, P Butler 1-1, R Cummins 1-0, B Cummins 1-0, P Kavanagh 0-3, F Collins 0-3, É O'Donoghue 0-1, J Horgan 0-1.		P Horgan 0-9, T Collins 0-1.	Attendance: 14,467; Referee: J Moloney (Tipperary)

== Scoring statistics ==
Top scorers overall

Rank	Player	Club	Tally	Total	Matches	Average
1	Paddy O'Sullivan	Seandún	5-04	19	4	4.75
1	Pat Horgan	Glen Rovers	0-19	19	4	4.75
3	Ray Cummins	Blackrock	3-08	17	4	4.25
4	Frank Coleman	Carrigdhoun	4-03	15	2	7.50
4	Éamonn O'Sullivan	Blackrock	4-03	15	4	3.75
4	Gus O'Driscoll	Carrigdhoun	3-06	15	2	7.50
7	Noel Morgan	Nemo Rangers	4-02	14	3	4.66
7	Bertie Óg Murphy	Sarsfields	3-05	14	1	14.00
7	John Kevin Coleman	Carrigdhoun	3-05	14	2	7.00
7	Bernie Meade	Seandún	1-11	14	4	3.50

Top scorers in a single game

Rank	Player	Club	Tally	Total	Opposition
1	Frank Coleman	Carrigdhoun	4-02	14	Muskerry
1	Bertie Óg Murphy	Sarsfields	3-05	14	Seandún
3	Éamonn O'Sullivan	Blackrock	3-02	11	Bandon
3	John Kevin Coleman	Carrigdhoun	2-05	11	Muskerry
5	Gus O'Driscoll	Imokilly	2-04	10	St. Vincent's
5	Ray Cummins	Blackrock	2-04	10	Bandon
7	Dan Linehan	St. Vincent's	2-03	9	Imokilly
7	Pat Moylan	Blackrock	1-06	9	Duhallow
7	Pat Horgan	Glen Rovers	0-09	9	Blackrock

=== Miscellaneous ===
- Seandún qualify for the semi-final for the first time since 1960.
