= 1977 Cork Senior Football Championship =

Gaelic football competition

- Dates: 17 April 1977 – 23 October 1977
- Teams: 20
- Champions: Nemo Rangers (4th title); Séamus Coughlan (captain)
- Runners-up: St Michael's; Tony Murphy (captain)

Tournament statistics
- Matches played: 21
- Goals scored: 59 (2.81 per match)
- Points scored: 368 (17.52 per match)
- Top scorer(s): Leo Gould (3-14)

The 1977 Cork Senior Football Championship was the 89th staging of the Cork Senior Football Championship since its establishment by the Cork County Board in 1887. The draw for the opening round fixtures took place on 30 January 1977. The championship began on 17 April 1977 and ended on 23 October 1977.

St. Finbarr's entered the championship as the defending champions, however, they were beaten by Nemo Rangers at the quarter-final stage.

On 23 October 1977, Nemo Rangers won the championship following a 1–08 to 1–03 defeat of St Michael's in the final. This was their fourth championship title overall and their first title since 1975.

University College Cork's Leo Gould was the championship's top scorer with 3–14.

== Team changes ==
=== To Championship ===
Promoted from the Cork Intermediate Football Championship

- Glanworth

=== From Championship ===
Regraded to the Cork Intermediate Football Championship

- Macroom

== Results ==
=== First round ===
17 April 1977 First round	St. Nicholas'	4-09 - 1-08	Beara	Ballingeary
	F Cunningham 2-4, T O'Brien 1-2, F O'Sullivan 1-0, J O'Sullivan 0-2, R Crowley 0-1.		B O'Dwyer 0-4, S O'Shea 1-0, B O'Neill 0-2, O O'Sullivan 0-1, DJ O'Shea 0-1.

17 April 1977 First round	Millstreet	1-10 - 1-05	Na Piarsaigh	Bishop Casey Memorial Park, Mallow
	J Kenneally 0-5, TJ Dennehy 1-1, T Kelleher 0-2, T Kenneally 0-2.		J Devereux 1-0, R McDonnell 0-3, G Moynihan 0-1, P O'Shea 0-1.

8 May 1977 First round	Seandún	0-09 - 0-09	Avondhu	Castlelyons
	E Forde 0-3, E McCarthy 0-2, V Twomey 0-2, M O'Regan 0-1, J Barry 0-1.		P Mulcahy 0-6, B Higgins 0-1, M O'Malley 0-1, E O'Sullivan 0-1.

15 May 1977 First round	University College Cork	4-08 - 1-05	Glanworth	Castlelyons
	L Gould 2-2, J Meyler 1-1, P Liston 1-0, T Regan 0-3, J Mulvihill 0-1, T O'Sullivan 0-1.		D Courtney 1-0, J Courtney 0-3, B McAuliffe 0-1, DJ Ryan 0-1.	Referee: T Murphy (Glanmire)

29 May 1977 First round replay	Seandún	2-09 - 0-09	Avondhu	Castlelyons
	D Keane 1-2, P Regan 1-0, E McCarthy 0-2, E Forde 0-2, C McCarthy 0-1, D Cummins 0-1, W O'Driscoll 0-1.		G Mulcahy 0-5, J Roche 0-1, N Kirby 0-1, E O'Sullivan 0-1, M Mullins 0-1.

=== Second round ===
17 April 1977 Second round	Dohenys	1-04 - 2-10	St Michael's	Cloughduv
	D Collins 0-4, D Crowley 1-0.		D Buckley 1-3, P Ward 1-0, E O'Donoghue 0-2, D Curtin 0-2, T Lyons 0-2, P Kavanagh 0-1.

17 April 1977 Second round	Bishopstown	5-15 - 2-03	Carrigdhoun	Páirc Uí Chaoimh, Cork
	J Lynch 2-4, E Murphy 1-5, T O'Reilly 1-1, J Crowley 1-0, E O'Connor 0-3, P Collins 0-2.		G Collins 1-1, D Moore 1-0, B Foley 0-1, Barry McGovern 0-1.	Referee: E Porter (Brian Dillons)

24 April 1977 Second round	St. Finbarr's	2-06 - 0-08	Clonakilty	Charlie Hurley Park, Bandon
	J Barry-Murphy 2-2, J O'Callaghan 0-1, C Myers 0-1, G McCarthy 0-1, C Ryan 0-1.		P O'Regan 0-3, D Noonan 0-2, TF Hayes 0-2, D McCarthy 0-1.	Referee: TJ Lyons (Canovee)

24 April 1977 Second round	Nemo Rangers	2-16 - 1-05	Muskerry	Charlie Hurley Park, Bandon
	N Morgan 1-2, L Good 1-0, S Coughlan 0-3, J Barrett 0-3, C Murphy 0-3, D Allen 0-2, D Murphy 0-1, K Collins 0-1, D Geary 0-1.		C Kelly 1-0, N Dunne 0-1, M Malone 0-1, R Twomey 0-1, T O'Sullivan 0-1, S Murphy 0-1.	Referee: P O'Donovan (Bantry Blues)

24 April 1977 Second round	Imokilly	0-09 - 2-14	Duhallow	Kildorrery
	W Galvin 0-2, T O'Sullivan 0-2, G Glavin 0-2, T Hickey 0-1, T Fenton 0-1, T Canavan 0-1.		M Stack 1-3, J Collins 1-2, S Curtin 0-5, B Daly 0-2, J Reardon 0-1, A O'Mahony 0-1.

15 May 1977 Second round	Bantry Blues	1-08 - 1-08	Carbery	Clonakilty
	K Evans 1-1, P McCarthy 0-2, D Barron 0-2, D Hunt 0-1, J O'Riordan 0-1, T O'Reilly 0-1.		P Ryan 1-1, R Wilmot 0-2, T Holland 0-2, K Swanton 0-1, TJ O'Regan 0-1, D Crowley 0-1.

29 May 1977 Second round replay	Bantry Blues	0-13 - 2-08	Carbery	Clonakilty
	F Carroll 0-4, D Hunt 0-3, K Evans 0-2, D Barron 0-1, A Delaney 0-1, T O'Sullivan 0-1, P Fehilly 0-1.		T Holland 0-5, M Burns 1-1, D Crowley 1-0, P Ryan 0-1, TJ Regan 0-1.

19 June 1977 Second round	Millstreet	1-10 - 0-06	Seandún	Macroom
	J Kenneally 1-3, T Kenneally 0-5, J O'Keeffe 0-1, D O'Hare 0-1.		J Rall 0-2, D Cummins 0-1, E Forde 0-1, M O'Regan 0-1, P Harrington 0-1.

29 June 1977 Second round	St. Nicholas'	0-07 - 0-09	University College Cork	Páirc Uí Chaoimh, Cork
	J O'Sullivan 0-2, JJ O'Neill 0-1, T O'Neill 0-1, F O'Sullivan 0-1, R Crowley 0-1, D Coughlan 0-1.		S Walsh 0-3, C Mangan 0-2, L Gould 0-2, J O'Sullivan 0-1.

=== Quarter-finals ===
3 June 1977 Quarter-final	Nemo Rangers	0-09 - 0-07	St. Finbarr's	Páirc Uí Chaoimh, Cork
	S Coughlan 0-4, D Geary 0-2, D Allen 0-1, J Barrett 0-1, D Linehan 0-1.		G McCarthy 0-3, J O'Callaghan 0-1, D Burns 0-1, J Allen 0-1, C Myers 0-1.	Referee: D O'Connor (Bishopstown)

12 June 1977 Quarter-final	St Michael's	5-19 - 0-04	Duhallow	Coachford
	R Cummins 1-6, P Ward 2-2, E O'Donoghue 1-4, T Lyons 1-1, P Kavanagh 0-3, D Buckley 0-2, D O'Sullivan 0-1.		B Mullane 0-1, E O'Connor 0-1, M Stack 0-1, S Curtin 0-1.	Referee: R Twomey (Ballincollig)

31 July 1977 Quarter-final	University College Cork	1-11 - 2-07	Millstreet	Coachford
	L Gould 1-7, J Mulvihill 0-2, S Walsh 0-1, C Kearney 0-1.		T Kenneally 1-3, TJ Dennehy 1-0, D O'Hare 0-1, D O'Connor 0-1, J Kenneally 0-1, J Burke 0-1.	Referee: P Finnegan

31 July 1977 Quarter-final	Bishopstown	3-10 - 1-09	Carbery	Macroom
	D Murphy 1-2, J Crowley 1-1, F Lynch 1-0, T O'Reilly 0-2, E O'Connor 0-2, J Lynch 0-2, G O'Herlihy 0-1.		D Collins 1-1, E Philpott 0-2, T Crowley 0-1, D Crowley 0-1, N Crowley 0-1, TJ O'Regan 0-1, P Ryan 0-1, T Murphy 0-1.

=== Semi-finals ===
17 September 1977 Semi-final	St Michael's	2-10 - 2-07	University College Cork	Páirc Uí Chaoimh, Cork
	E O'Donoghue 1-1, T Cashman 1-0, B Field 0-3, B Ward 0-2, A Creagh 0-1, D McCurtain 0-1, P Crowley 0-1, D Keating 0-1.		J Mulvihill 1-1, C Kearney 1-0, L Gould 0-3, S Walsh 0-2, G Desmond 0-1.	Referee: J Dennigan (Fermoy)

17 September 1977 Semi-final	Nemo Rangers	3-17 - 2-07	Bishopstown	Páirc Uí Chaoimh, Cork
	D Allen 2-3, D Linehan 0-7, N Morgan 1-2, S Coughlan 0-2, C Murphy 0-1, T Dalton 0-1, J Kerrigan 0-1.		N Murphy 2-0, J Crowley 0-3, E O'Connor 0-1, T O'Reilly 0-1, J Lynch 0-1, R Murphy 0-1.	Referee: P Cronin (St. Finbarr's)

=== Final ===
23 October 1977 Fibal	Nemo Rangers	1-08 - 1-03	St Michael's	Páirc Uí Chaoimh, Cork
	D Allen 1-2, D Linehan 0-3, S Coughlan 0-2, L Good 0-1.		R Cummins 1-0, D Buckley 0-2, P Kavanagh 0-1.	Referee: P O'Donovan (Bantry)

== Championship statistics ==
=== Top scorers ===
Overall

Rank	Player	Club	Tally	Total	Matches	Average
1	Leo Gould	UCC	3-14	23	4	5.75
2	Dinny Allen	Nemo Rangers	3-08	17	4	4.25
3	John Lynch	Bishopstown	2-07	13	3	4.33
3	Éamonn O'Donoghue	St Michael's	2-07	13	3	4.33
3	Ted Kenneally	Millstreet	1-10	13	3	4.33
8	Ray Cummins	St Michael's	2-06	12	3	4.00
8	Jim Kenneally	Millstreet	1-09	12	3	4.00
10	Pat Ward	St Michael's	3-02	11	4	2.75
10	Denis Lenihan	Nemo Rangers	0-11	11	4	2.75
10	Séamus Coughlan	Nemo Rangers	0-11	11	4	2.75

In a single game

Rank	Player	Club	Tally	Total	Opposition
1	Frankie Cunningham	St. Nicholas'	2-04	10	Beara
1	John Lynch	Bishopstown	2-04	10	Carrigdhoun
1	Leo Gould	UCC	1-07	10	Millstreet
4	Dinny Allen	Nemo Rangers	2-03	9	Bishopstown
4	Ray Cummins	St Michael's	1-06	9	Duhallow
6	Leo Gould	UCC	2-02	8	Glanworth
6	Jimmy Barry-Murphy	St. Finbarr's	2-02	8	Clonakilty
6	Pat Ward	St Michael's	2-02	8	Duhallow
6	Eddie Murphy	Bishopstown	1-05	8	Carrigdhoun
10	Éamonn O'Donoghue	St Michael's	1-04	7	Duhallow
10	Denis Lenihan	Nemo Rangers	0-07	7	Bishopstown
