= 1975–76 All-Ireland Senior Club Hurling Championship =

All-Ireland Senior Club Hurling Championship 1975–76
Championship Details
- Dates: 2 November 1975 – 14 March 1976

All Ireland Champions
- Winners: James Stephens (1st win)
- Captain: Fan Larkin

All Ireland Runners-up
- Runners-up: Blackrock
- Captain: Éamonn O'Donoghue

Provincial Champions
- Munster: Blackrock
- Leinster: James Stephens
- Ulster: Ballygalget
- Connacht: Ardrahan

Championship Statistics
- Top Scorer: Liam O'Brien (3–25)

The 1975–76 All-Ireland Senior Club Hurling Championship was the sixth staging of the All-Ireland Senior Club Hurling Championship, the Gaelic Athletic Association's premier inter-county club hurling tournament. The championship ran from 2 November 1975 to 14 March 1976.

St Finbarr's of Cork were the defending champions, however, they failed to qualify after being beaten by Seandún in the quarter-final of the 1975 Cork SHC. Moneyall of Tipperary made their championship debut.

The All-Ireland final was played on 14 March 1976 at Croke Park in Dublin, between James Stephens of Kilkenny and Blackrock of Cork, in what was their first ever championship meeting. James Stephens won the match by 2–10 to 2–04 to claim a first title.

== Connacht Senior Club Hurling Championship ==
=== Connacht first round ===
16 November 1975 First round	Allen Gaels	2–03 – 2–03	Craobh Rua	McGettigan Memorial Park
	C Lalor 1–1, T Barrett 1–0, J Devine 0–2.		V McKeon 2–1, T Mulvey 0–2.

16 November 1975 First round	Athleague	3–05 – 2–06	Tooreen	Athleague Sportsfield

30 November 1975 First round replay	Craobh Rua	8–06 – 0–10	Allen Gaels	Markievicz Park
			T Mulbey 0–5, E McGowan 0–3, S Guckian 0–2.

=== Connacht semi-final ===
14 December 1975 Semi-final	Craobh Rua	2–04 – 2–06	Athleague	Markievicz Park
	C Lawlor 1–2, J McDonnell 1–0, L Devine 0–2.		H Crowley 1–1, T Geraghty 1–0, C Naughton 0–2, C McConn 0–2, A Flaherty 0–1.

=== Connacht final ===
7 March 1976 Final	Athleague	1–04 – 2–14	Ardrahan	Athleague Sportsfield

== Leinster Senior Club Hurling Championship ==
=== Leinster first round ===
22 November 1975 First round	Ardclough	1–11 – 2–09	St. Vincent's	St Conleth's Park
	J Walsh 0–6, N Walsh 1–2, T Christian 0–1, B Burke 0–1, S Butler 0–1.

23 November 1975 First round	Buffers Alley	4–15 – 0–06	Naomh Eoin	Páirc Uí Shíocháin
	W Doran 4–2, M Butler 0–6, L Harney 0–3, J McLean 0–2, M Casey 0–2.		P Quirke 0–3, J Doyle 0–1, S Kehoe 0–1, M Nolan 0–1.

23 November 1975 First round	Boardsmill	6–16 – 0–03	Naomh Colmcille	Páirc Tailteann
	V Guy 3–1, S Garrigan 1–5, L Gibbons 1–0, B Kelly 1–0, S Carney 0–3, M Reilly 0–2, M Mooney 0–2, TJ Reilly 0–2.		M Rice 0–2, J Clarke 0–1.

=== Leinster quarter-finals ===
14 December 1975 Quarter-final	Clonaslee	3–08 – 2–14	St Rynagh's	O'Moore Park
	F Bates 2–2, R O'Keeffe 1–0, P Bates 0–4, D O'Loughlin 0–1, S Murphy 0–1.		PJ Whelehan 0–7, P Horan 0–4, JJ Devery 1–0, B Lyons 1–0, G Woods 0–2, D Devery 0–1.

14 December 1975 Quarter-final	Boardsmill	1–13 – 2–01	Lough Lene Gaels	St Loman's Park
	S Garrigan 1–6, S Carney 0–4, D Fay 0–3.		J Walsh 1–1, B Connell 1–0.

14 December 1975 Quarter-final	Buffers Alley	1–15 – 3–11	James Stephens	Wexford Park
	M Butler 1–8, T Doran 0–2, P Butler 0–2, M Casey 0–1, L Harney 0–1, J Doran 0–1.		M Leahy 2–0, L O'Brien 0–5, J McCormack 0–4, G Tyrrell 1–0, M Crotty 0–1, B Cody 0–1.

14 December 1975 Quarter-final	St Vincent's	4–07 – 1–08	Glenealy	O'Toole Park
	R Copeland 2–0, L Deegan 1–2, M O'Hanlon 1–0, T Hanahoe 0–2, J Keaveney 0–1, B Dwyer 0–1, T Quinn 0–1.		T Glynn 1–3, M Neill 0–2, T Barniville 0–1, D Gorman 0–1, P Barry 0–1.

=== Leinster semi-finals ===
11 January 1976 Semi-final	St Vincent's	1–02 – 1–09	James Stephens	Croke Park
	B Lee 1–0, N Rooney 0–1, T Hanahoe 0–1.		M Crotty 0–4, M Leahy 1–0, J McCormack 0–2, L O'Brien 0–2, D McCormack 0–1.

11 January 1976 Semi-final	Boardsmill	0–09 – 6–10	St Rynagh's	St Loman's Park
	S Carney 0–6, V Guy 0–1, S Garrigan 0–1, M Garrigan 0–1.		P Mulhare 2–3, B Lyons 2–1, D Devereux 2–0, PJ Whelehan 0–3, P Horan 0–2, M Moylan 0–1.

=== Leinster final ===
25 January 1976 Final	James Stephens	1–14 – 2–04	St Rynagh's	Dr Cullen Park
	L O'Brien 0–8, J McCormack 0–4, M Leahy 1–0, T McCormack 0–1, M Crotty 0–1.		JJ Devery 1–0, G Woods 1–0, PJ Whelehan 0–2, P Horan 0–1, P Mulhare 0–1.	Referee: J Rankins (Laois)

== Munster Senior Club Hurling Championship ==
=== Munster quarter-finals ===
9 November 1975 Quarter-final	Kilmallock	1–11 – 3–07	Blackrock	FitzGerald Park
	P Kelly 0–7, D O'Riordan 1–1, J O'Riordan 0–1, M Finn 0–1, T Malone 0–1.		B Cummins 2–1, É O'Donoghue 1–0, P Kavanagh 0–2, J Horgan 0–1, F Cummins 0–1, P Moylan 0–1, D Prendergast 0–1.

9 November 1975 Quarter-final	Moneygall	2–11 – 0–06	Éire Óg, Ennis	MacDonagh Park
	D Kennedy 0–5, B McLeish 1–0, S Ryan 1–0, P Ryan 0–3, P Sheedy 0–2, S Doughan 0–1.		J McAllister 0–3, B Gilligan 0–1, V Daly 0–1, M Dilger 0–1.

=== Munster semi-finals ===
26 October 1970 Semi-final	Mount Sion	8–13 – 1–04	St Brendan's Ardfert	Walsh Park
	J Greene 3–6, S Greene 2–0, W Power 1–1, G O'Grady 1–1, J Goulding 1–0, J Brick 0–3, P McGrath 0–1, L Slevin 0–1.		JJ McGrath 1–1, W Maguire 0–1, M Fitzgerald 0–1, J McCarthy 0–1.

23 November 1975 Semi-final	Blackrock	3–14 – 3–06	Moneygall	Church Road
	P Moylan 0–6, R Cummins 1–2, P Kavanagh 1–1, B Cummins 1–0, É O'Sullivan 0–3, D Collins 0–1, J Horgan 0–1.		P Ryan 2–4, P Sheedy 1–1, E Ryan 0–1.	Referee: S O'Grady (Limerick)

=== Munster final ===
7 December 1975 Final	Blackrock	8–12 – 3–08	Mount Sion	St Ailbe's Park
	R Cummins 3–2, É O'Donoghue 3–1, É O'Sullivan 1–4, P Kavanagh 1–1, P Moylan 0–3, J Horgan 0–1.		G O'Grady 0–4, S Greene 1–0, M Geary 1–0, P McGrath 1–0, P Geary 0–2, B Power 0–1, B Knox 0–1.	Referee: J Moloney (Tipperary)

== Ulster Senior Club Hurling Championship ==
=== Ulster semi-final ===
22 November 1975 Final	Kevin Lynch's	1–02 – 9–06	Ballycastle McQuillans	Lavey Grounds
	P Mellon 1–0, J McGurk 0–2.		E Donnelly 3–1, D Donnellty 2–0, L Elliott 2–0, B Donnelly 1–0, R Elliott 1–0, P Boyle 0–3, M Dallat 0–2.

=== Ulster final ===
14 December 1975 Final	Ballygalget	4–06 – 1–09	Ballycastle McQuillans	McAllister & McVeigh Memorial Park
	G McGrattan 2–1, P Braniff 1–1, B Couler 0–3, J Coulter 1–0, W Coulter 0–1.		E Donnelly 1–4, P Boyle 0–1, P Dallat 0–1, D Donnelly 0–1, R Elliott 0–1, M Dallat 0–1.

== All-Ireland Senior Club Hurling Championship ==
=== All-Ireland quarter-final ===
1 February 1976 Quarter-final	Ardrahan	0–07 – 0–05	Brian Borus	Ballinasloe Grounds
	B Forde 0–2, J Mahony 0–2, JJ O'Dea 0–1, P Neiland 0–1, V Mullins 0–1.		J Walshe 0–2, T Connolly 0–1, M Hughes 0–1, F Foy 0–1.

=== All-Ireland semi-finals ===
22 February 1976 Semi-final	Blackrock	2–15 – 1–12	Ardrahan	Balliansloe
	P Moylan 0–9, R Cummins 1–1, P Kavanagh 1–0, E O'Donoghue 0–2, E O'Sullivan 0–1, T Lyons 0–1, D Collins 0–1.		V Mullins 1–2, M Bond 0–5, B Forde 0–4, G Bond 0–1.	Referee: M Spain (Offaly)

22 February 1976 Semi-final	James Stephens	4–15 – 1–07	Ballygalget	Nowlan Park
	L O'Brien 2–6, S Brennan 2–2, J Hennessy 0–2, K McCormack 0–2, M Taylor 0–1, B Cody 0–1, D McCormack 0–1.		P Braniff 1–0, J Coulter 0–2, S Baillie 0–2, G McGrattan 0–1, W McAvera 0–1, B Coulter 0–1.

=== All-Ireland final ===
14 March 1976 Final	James Stephens	2–10 – 2–04	Blackrock	Croke Park
	L O'Brien 1–4, M Leahy 1–0, J McCormack 0–3, J O'Brien 0–1, M Taylor 0–1, M Crotty 0–1.		P Moylan 1–3, E O'Donoghue 1–0, D Collins 0–1.	Referee: J Rankins (Laois)

== Championship statistics ==
=== Top scorers ===
Rank	Player	Club	Tally	Total	Matches	Average
1	Liam O'Brien	James Stephens	3–25	34	5	6.80
2	Pat Moylan	Blackrock	1–22	25	5	5.00
3	Ray Cummins	Blackrock	5–05	20	5	4.00
4	Éamonn O'Donoghue	Blackrock	5–03	18	5	3.60
4	Seán Garrigan	Boardsmill	2–11	18	2	9.00
5	Mick Butler	Buffers Alley	1–14	17	2	8.50
