= 1976 All-Ireland Senior Club Hurling Championship final =

1976 All-Ireland Senior Club Hurling Championship Final
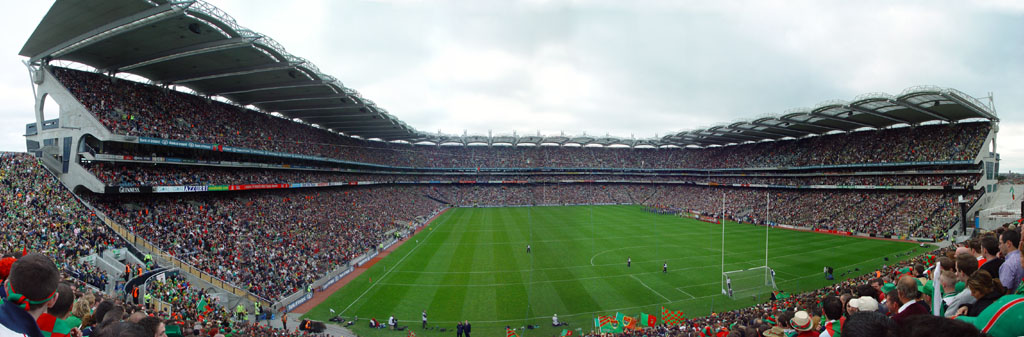
- View from the Hill in Croke Park
- Event: 1975–76 All-Ireland Senior Club Hurling Championship
James Stephens	Blackrock
2-10	2-4
- Date: 14 March 1976
- Venue: Croke Park, Dublin
- Referee: Jimmy Rankins (Laois)
- Attendance: 3,000

The 1976 All-Ireland Senior Club Hurling Championship final was a hurling match played at Croke Park on 14 March 1976, to determine the winners of the 1975–76 All-Ireland Senior Club Hurling Championship, the sixth season of the All-Ireland Senior Club Hurling Championship, a tournament organised by the Gaelic Athletic Association for the champion clubs of the four provinces of Ireland. The final was contested by James Stephens of Kilkenny and Blackrock of Cork, with James Stephens winning by 2-10 to 2-4.

Blackrock entered the game as strong favourites as they were chasing a third All-Ireland title in five years, having won the finals of 1972 and 1974. Wind and rain spoiled the occasion, however, the Rockies got off to a great start as Éamonn O'Donoghue scored a goal inside the first minute. A goal from a Pat Moylan penalty in the 16th minute gave Blackrock a lead of 2-1 with James Stephens yet to score. The Village then made a vital switch as Joe Hennessy was moved from right wing-forward to right wing-back. By half time, James Stephens had cut the lead to five points as they trailed by 2-2 to 0-3.

James Stephens were transformed in the second half with their full-back and half-back lines repelling the Blackrock attack. A draw looked likely as the game entered the final stage, however, a last minute Mick Leahy put the game beyond doubt as James Stephens claimed a 2-10 to 2-4 victory.

James Stephens' victory secured their first All-Ireland title. Similarly, they became the first team from Kilkenny to claim the ultimate prize, while simultaneously breaking the Munster dominance at All-Ireland level.

Blackrock's All-Ireland defeat was their first and only loss in a final. They also became the first side from Cork and Munster to face defeat in the All-Ireland final.

== Match ==
=== Details ===
14 March 1976

James Stephens	2-10 - 2-4	Blackrock
L O'Brien 1-4 (3f), M Leahy 1-0, J McCormack 0-3, M Crotty 0-1, M Taylor 0-1, J O'Brien 0-1.		P Moylan 1-3 (1-2f), É O'Donoghue 1-0, D Collins 0-1 (1f).

Croke Park, Dublin
Attendance: 3,000
Referee: J Rankins (Laois)

James Stephens	Blackrock
