= Ballinlough, Cork =

Suburb of Cork, Ireland

Ballinlough Baile an Locha
- Suburb
- Location in Ireland
- Coordinates: 51°53′22″N 8°26′47″W
- Country: Ireland
- Administrative area: Cork (city)
- Time zone: UTC+0 (WET)
  - Summer (DST): UTC-1 (IST (WEST))

Ballinlough (Irish: Baile an Locha, meaning 'town of the lake') is a mainly residential townland and suburb on the southside of Cork city, in Ireland. It is located between Ballintemple and the larger suburbs of Douglas and Blackrock.

While previously separated from Cork city, Ballinlough is now within the Cork City Council administrative boundary and zoned as a suburban residential area. As of 2022, it had amongst the most expensive residential properties in Ireland, outside of Dublin, based on the price of a three-bed semi-detached house.

== History ==
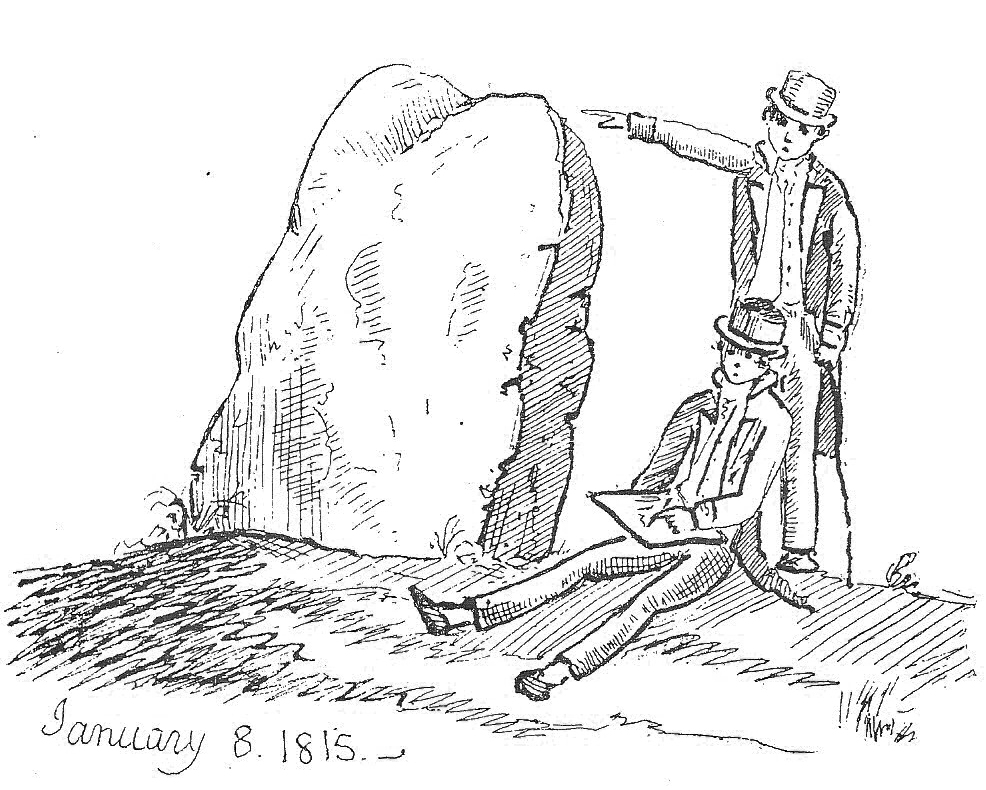
Illustration of Croker's 1815 survey of the Ballinlough Stone

Among the earliest written references to the townland and then village of Ballinlough date from 1601 (as "Ballinlogha") in the Calendar to Fiants of reign of Henry VIII, and from 1655 (as "Ballinloghy") in the Down Survey. These Irish language names (Baile an Locha, the town of the lake) reflected the position of the village focal-points (including Ballinlough House and the original Ballinlough school), close to Lough Mahon and the Douglas River Estuary. The Ballinlough Stone, a standing stone (gallaun) near Ballinlough House, was surveyed by antiquary Thomas Crofton Croker in the early 19th century. Later archaeological surveys of the stone question whether its origins are prehistoric, or if it is a less ancient boundary marker.

In the 19th century, land use in the area was mainly focused on farming and market gardening. The larger farms were managed from estate houses including Ballinlough House, Ardfallen House, Thorn Hill House, and LakeVille/Ravenscourt.

From the early 20th century, with Cork city expanding east, and the village expanding west, the area became more suburbanised. This included the building of housing developments during the 1920s and 1930s in the neighbouring and sub-townlands of Browingstown, Coppingers Stang, and Knockrea. Early 20th century censuses however still recorded 17 market gardeners in the area. With the construction of a new church in 1938, two additional schools in 1944 and 1965, and a later community centre, the focal-points of the (now) suburb shifted westward towards the city. Previously separated by remaining green belts and outside the city's administrative area, Ballinlough has been within the Cork City Council administrative boundary since 1965, and is zoned as a suburban residential area.

== Amenities ==
The community centre in Ballinlough includes a public park and a number of buildings which host community activities. The main building hosts a Montessori school, bowls and bingo events. The 38th/40th Cork Scout Group (a member of Scouting Ireland) is also based on the community centre site, as is the youth club (which is affiliated with Ógra Chorcaí). Ballinlough Tennis Club has five outdoor courts in the community centre complex, and is accredited to Tennis Ireland's "gold" standard for facilities and club management. The Gus Healy Municipal Swimming Pool is also in Ballinlough.

The Ballinlough GAA grounds are used for games in the Seandún (city) division of the Cork County Board. The Páirc Uí Rinn Gaelic Athletic Association grounds and the Cork Constitution rugby club lie on the border between Ballinlough and Ballintemple.

Ballinlough is an independent Roman Catholic parish of the Cork and Ross Catholic Diocese and is home to Our Lady of Lourdes Church. It is also the location of the Wesley chapel of the Cork Methodist Church - which also operates a sheltered housing complex from the grounds of Ardfallen House.

== Education ==
There are three primary schools in Ballinlough: St. Anthony's Boys National School, Eglantine Girls National School, and Our Lady of Lourdes Girls National School. Rockboro School, a private primary school off the Boreenmana Road on the boundary with South Parish, closed in 2023.

Singer Mary Hegarty and a number of Olympic athletes, including Louise Shanahan and Margaret Cremen, are past pupils of Eglantine Girls National School. Past pupils of St. Anthony's Boys National School include actors Cillian Murphy and Cillian O'Sullivan, rugby players Peter Stringer, Patrick Campbell, Niall Scannell, Rory Scannell, and Billy Scannell, hurlers Shane Kingston, Alan Cadogan, Robbie Cotter, Brian Hayes and Cathal Cormack, Gaelic footballers Michéal Aodh Martin, Mark Cronin and Kevin O'Donovan, and Olympic rower Ronan Byrne.

== Notable residents ==
- Ray Cummins (b.1948), and his brothers Brendan (b.1950) and Kevin (b.1946), are former Cork hurling and Gaelic football players from Ballinlough
- Micheál Martin (b.1960), leader of Fianna Fáil and 15th Taoiseach
- Alf McCarthy (1950–2024), broadcaster
- Josephine McCoy (1891/1892–1966), spy during the War of Independence who married IRA intelligence officer Florence O'Donoghue and later lived at Eglantine Park
- Donncha O'Callaghan (b.1979), retired international rugby player, lived in Ballinlough before moving to Rochestown
- Cillian O'Sullivan (b.1989/1990), actor
- Eimear Ryan (b.1986/1987), author
- Seán Ó Sé (1936–2026), traditional Irish singer, originally from Ballylickey, who lived in Ballinlough later in his life
- Pearse Wyse (1923–2009), politician and community activist, lived in Ballinlough until his death in 2009
