= 1969 Cork Intermediate Football Championship =

Gaelic football competition

- Dates: 20 April – 13 November 1969
- Teams: 12
- Champions: St. Michael's (1st title); Kevin O'Sullivan (captain)
- Runners-up: Dohenys

The 1969 Cork Intermediate Football Championship was the 34th staging of the Cork Intermediate Football Championship since its establishment by the Cork County Board in 1909. The draw for the opening round fixtures took place on 26 January 1969. The championship began on 20 April 1969 and ended on 13 November 1969.

The final was played on 13 November 1969 at Cloughduv GAA Grounds, between St Michael's and Dohenys, in what was their first ever final meeting. St. Michael's won the match by 5-08 to 1-03 to claim their first ever championship title.

== Results ==
=== Quarter-finals ===
11 May 1969 Quarter-final	Canovee	0-13 - 2-09	Dohenys	Ballingeary GAA Grounds

11 May 1969 Quarter-final	St. Finbarr's	1-03 - 0-06	Urhan	Bantry Town Park

1 June 1969 Quarter-final replay	St. Finbarr's	4-08 - 1-02	Urhan	Bantry Town Park

3 August 1969 Quarter-final	St Michael's	3-11 - 2-06	St. Finbarr's	Páirc Uí Chonaill

3 August 1969 Quarter-final	Newcestown	4-01 - 1-00	Fermoy	Cork Athletic Grounds

=== Semi-finals ===
17 August 1969 Semi-final	Dohenys	0-12 - 1-02	St. Finbarr's	Cloughduv GAA Grounds

19 October 1969 Semi-final	St Michael's	0-09 - 2-03	Newcestown	Kinsale GAA Grounds

9 November 1969 Semi-final replay	St Michael's	1-17 - 1-09	Newcestown	Kinsale GAA Grounds

=== Final ===
30 November 1969 Final	St Michael's	5-08 - 1-03	Dohenys	Cloughduv GAA Grounds
	R Cummins 2-1, N O'Keeffe 1-4, P Moylan 1-2, B Cummins 1-0, D McCarthy 0-1.		A Collins 1-1, T McDonnell 0-1, B O'Rourke 0-1.	Referee: F Halbert (Glenville)
