= 1978–79 All-Ireland Senior Club Hurling Championship =

All-Ireland Senior Club Hurling Championship 1978–79
Championship Details
- Dates: 8 October 1978 – 25 March 1979

All Ireland Champions
- Winners: Blackrock (3rd win)
- Captain: John Horgan

All Ireland Runners-up
- Runners-up: Ballyhale Shamrocks
- Captain: Denis Shefflin

Provincial Champions
- Munster: Blackrock
- Leinster: Ballyhale Shamrocks
- Ulster: McQuillan's
- Connacht: Ardrahan

Championship Statistics
- Top Scorer: Joe Henry (7–17)

The 1978–79 All-Ireland Senior Club Hurling Championship was the ninth season of the All-Ireland Senior Club Hurling Championship, the Gaelic Athletic Association's premier club hurling tournament. The championship ran from 8 October 1978 to 25 March 1979.

St Finbarr's of Cork were the defending champions, however, they failed to qualify after being beaten by Glen Rovers in the semi-finals of the 1978 Cork SHC. Crumlin of Dublin and Dunhill of Waterford made their championship debuts.

The All-Ireland final was played at Semple Stadium in Thurles on 25 March 1979, between Blackrock of Cork and Ballyhale Shamrocks of Kilkenny, in what was a first championship meeting between the teams. Blackrock won the match by 5–07 to 5–05 and became the first team to win the title three times.

Tooreen's Joe Henry was the championship's top scorer with 7–17.

== Connacht Senior Club Hurling Championship ==
=== Connacht quarter-finals ===
5 November 1978 Quarter-final	St Mary's	0–03 – 4–15	Athleague	Páirc Seán Mac Diarmada

12 November 1978 Quarter-final	Tooreen	6–10 – 0–01	Tourlestrane	Ballyhaunis Grounds
	J Henry 6-7, J Cunnane 0-2, R Greeley 0-1.		L McEntyre 0-1.

=== Connacht semi-final ===
19 November 1978 Semi-final	Athleague	1–03 – 2–05	Tooreen	Athleague Sportsfield
	A Flaherty 1-2, D Finneran 0-1.		A Henry 2-0, J Henry 0-3, T Henry 0-1, J Cunnane 0-1.

=== Connacht final ===
3 December 1978 First round	Ardrahan	2–09 – 1–07	Tooreen	Athleague Sportsfield
	M Whelan 1-1, V Mullins 1-0, G Bond 0-3, G Linnane 0-2, S Dolan 0-1, M Kearns 0-1, M Bond 0-1.		J Henry 1-7.

== Leinster Senior Club Hurling Championship ==
=== Leinster first round ===
22 October 1978 First round	Naomh Moninne	0–08 – 1–21	Kilmessan	Dundalk
	P Murphy 0–5, T Ryan 0–2, O Reilly 0–1.		E O'Neill 0–12, C Killeen 1–1, C Maguire 0–3, T Horan 0–2, G Hynes 0–1, N O'Riordan 0–1, B White 0–1.

22 October 1978 First round	Carnew Emmets	6–11 – 1–05	Carlow Town	Aughrim County Ground
	M Doyle 2–2, P Doyle 2–0, S Brennan 1–2, T Collins 1–0, M Doyle 0–3, S Doyle 0–2, P Brennan 0–1, M Doyle 0–1.		O Mullins 1–0, M Power 0–3, P Dunbar 0–1, W Power 0–1.

22 October 1978 First round	Brownstown	2–11 – 2–10	St. Brigid's	Cusack Park
	J Leonard 2–5, J Henry 0–2, J Fitzsimons 0–2, P Shaw 0–2.		P White 1–4, S Barry 1–2, M Power 0–1, M O'Connell 0–1, D Rankin 0–1, J O'Connell 0–1.

=== Leinster quarter-finals ===
5 November 1978 Quarter-final	Brownstown	3–08 – 2–13	Rapparees	Cusack Park
	J Leonard 2–5, C Shaw 1–0, M Carr 0–1, J Fitzsimons 0–1, E Dolan 0–1.		L Rigney 2–1, M Maher 0–4, H Goff 0–3, P Wilson 0–2, J Rigley 0–1, T Wildes 0–1, P Courtney 0–1.

5 November 1978 Quarter-final	Kilmessan	0–11 – 3–12	Camross	St Loman's Park
	E O'Neill 0–6, B White 0–2, G Hynes 0–2, T Horan 0–1.		F Keenan 1–4, Martin Cuddy 1–2, S Bergin 1–1, Michael Cuddy 0–2, S Collier 0–1, J Fitzpatrick 0–1, P Dowling 0–1.

5 November 1978 Quarter-final	Crumlin	4–14 – 2–13	Coolderry	Croke Park
	M Reynolds 3–3, B Donovan 1–1, L Hennebry 0–3, J Kealy 0–3, P Kavanagh 0–2, P McCarthy 0–2.		P Carroll 0–6, O Kennedy 1–1, D Dooley 1–1, D Loughnane 0–2, P McLoughney 0–2, M King 0–1.

5 November 1978 Quarter-final	Carnew Emmets	1–06 – 2–12	Ballyhale Shamrocks	Carnew Emmets Grounds
	S Brennan 1–2, T Sullivan 0–1, S Doyle 0–1, M Doyle 0–1, P Doyle 0–1.		M Fennelly 2–2, P Holden 0–4, G Fennelly 0–3, S Reid 0–1, J Walsh 0–1, B Fennelly 0–1.

=== Leinster semi-finals ===
19 November 1978 Semi-final	Crumlin	1–13 – 2–09	Rapparees	Geraldine Park
	M Reynolds 1-0, L Hennebry 0-3, B Donovan 0-3, M Reilly 0-2, J Keeley 0-2, N Clare 0-1, D McCarthy 0-1, D Murphy 0-1.		J Rigley 1-1, P Doyle 1-0, T Wilds 0-2, M Maher 0-2, P Wilson 0-1, C Keogh 0-1, H Gough 0-1, N Gough 0-1.

19 November 1978 Semi-final	Ballyhale Shamrocks	4–12 – 2–02	Camross	Geraldine Park
	B Fennelly 2–2, G Fennelly 0–6, M Fennelly 0–4, S Reid 1–0, P Hogan 1–0.		S Cuddy 1–1, M Cuddy 1–0, F Keenan 0–1.

=== Leinster final ===
3 December 1978 Final	Ballyhale Shamrocks	1–13 – 1–06	Crumlin	Dr Cullen Park
	B Fennelly 1–5, G Fennelly 0–4, S Reid 0–2, P Holden 0–1, L Fennelly 0–1.		P McCarthy 1–0, L Henneberry 0–2, J Kealy 0–2, C Henneberry 0–1, B Donovan 0–1.

=== Munster quarter-finals ===
22 October 1978 Quarter-final	Kilruane MacDonagh's	1–13 – 2–10	South Liberties	MacDonagh Park
	L O'Shea 1–3, S Hennessy 0–3, D Whelan 0–3, S O'Meara 0–2, G Williams 0–1, E O'Shea 0–1.		E Grimes 1–6, J McKenna 1–0, M Grimes 0–2, M Butler 0–1, L Shanahan 0–1.

5 November 1978 Quarter-final	Newmarket-on-Fergus	7–10 – 2–13	Dunhill	Newmarket-on-Fergus GAA Ground
	J McNamara 1–4, P McNamara 2–0, G Lohan 2–0, T Ryan 1–3, S Liddy 1–3.		T Casey 1–6, J Brohan 1–0, J Raher 0–2, P Walsh 0–2, R Power 0–1, S Cooke 0–1, F Murphy 0–1.

5 November 1978 Quarter-final replay	South Liberties	1–07 – 2–15	Kilruane MacDonagh's	Fr Hayes Memorial Park
	J McKenna 1–0, E Grimes 0–3, M Shanahan 0–2, M O'Brien 0–1, P Hartigan 0–1.		S O'Meara 1–3, S Hennessy 1–2, J Williams 0–3, L O'Shea 0–2, M Keogh 0–2, G Williams 0–1, D Whelan 0–1, L Gaynor 0–1.

=== Munster semi-finals ===
19 November 1978 Semi-final	Ballyduff	3–02 – 3–07	Newmarket-on-Fergus	Ballyduff Grounds
	J O'Sullivan 2–0, M O'Sullivan 1–0, J Bunyan 0–2.		T Ryan 0–4, M Gilmartin 1–0, G Lohan 1–0, M O'Leary 1–0, S Liddy 0–1, P McNamara 0–1, J McNamara 0–1.

19 November 1978 Semi-final	Blackrock	3–11 – 1–08	Kilruane MacDonagh's	Páirc Uí Chaoimh
	E O'Sullivan 2–0, D McCurtain 1–0, D Collins 0–2, R Cummins 0–2, P Moylan 0–2, E O'Donoghue 0–2, T Cashman 0–1, P Kavanagh 0–1, F Delaney 0–1.		S O'Meara 1–3, L O'Shea 0–3, S Hennessy 0–1, D Whelan 0–1.

=== Munster final ===
3 December 1978 Final	Blackrock	3–08 – 1–08	Newmarket-on-Fergus	Páirc Uí Chaoimh
	R Cummins 2–0, D Buckley 1–1, P Moylan 0–2, F Cummins 0–1, D McCurtain 0–1, P Kavanagh 0–1, E O'Donoghue 0–1, E O'Sullivan 0–1.		S Liddy 1–1, J McNamara 0–4, M Gilmartin 0–2, T Ryan 0–1.

== Ulster Senior Club Hurling Championship ==
=== Ulster semi-final ===
8 October 1978 Semi-final	Cúchullains	0–08 – 5–10	Ballycastle McQuillan's	Lurgan Grounds

=== Ulster final ===
22 October 1978 Final	Portaferry	2–07 – 2–15	Ballycastle McQuillan's	St Patrick's Park
	P Lennon 1-1, G Lennon 0-4, P Braniff 1-0, M Moreland 0-1, H Denvir 0-1.		P Boyle 0-7, B Donnelly 1-3, D Mooney 1-1, E Donnelly 0-3, T Barton 0-1.

== All-Ireland Senior Club Hurling Championship ==
=== All-Ireland quarter-final ===
28 January 1979 Quarter-final	Ardrahan	1–08 – 2–05	St Gabriel's	Pearse Stadium
	JJ O'Dea 1-0, M Whelan 0-3, G Bond 0-2, M Bond 0-2, V Mullins 0-1.		F Canning 0-4, M Linnane 1-0, K Burke 1-0, P Tierney 0-1.

18 February 1979 Quarter-final replay	St Gabriel's	2–09 – 0–10	Ardrahan	Páirc Ciaráin
	F Canning 1-4, A Gordon 0-3, J Geoghegan 1-0, M Nevin 0-1, T Burke 0-1.		G Bond 0-4, V Howley 0-2, V Mullins 0-1, M Bond 0-1, PJ Mahony 0-1, M Whelan 0-1.

=== All-Ireland semi-finals ===
4 March 1979 Semi-final	Ballyhale Shamrocks	4–10 – 1–07	St Gabriel's	Nowlan Park
	K Fennelly 1–4, P Holden 1–2, G Fennelly 1–1, L Fennelly 1–0, B Fennelly 0–2, M Fennelly 0–1.		F Canning 1-3, T Burke 0-3, A Gordon 0-1.

4 March 1979 Semi-final	Blackrock	5–12 – 2–06	Ballycastle McQuillan's	Páirc Mac Uílín
	É O'Donoghue 2–1, P Moylan 1–3, R Cummins 1–2, E O'Sullivan 1–1, T Lyons 0–2, D Collins 0–2, J Horgan 0–1.		E Donnelly 1–3, D Donnelly 1–0, P Boyle 0–2, P Vallatt 0–1.

=== All-Ireland final ===
25 March 1979 Final	Blackrock	5–07 – 5–05	Ballyhale Shamrocks	Semple Stadium
	P Moylan 1–4, R Cummins 2–1, E O'Sullivan 1–2, D Lyons 1–0.		K Fennelly 2–1, G Fennelly 0–4, P Holden 1–0, L Fennelly 1–0, B Fenenlly 1–0.	Referee: S Purcell (Galway)

== Statistics ==
=== Top scorers ===
Rank	Player	Club	Tally	Total	Matches	Average
1	Joe Henry	Tooreen	7–17	38	3	12.66
2	John Leonard	Brownstown	4–10	22	2	11.00
3	Ger Fennelly	Ballyhale Shamrocks	1–18	21	5	4.20
4	Ray Cummins	Blackrock	5–05	20	4	5.00
5	Brendan Fennelly	Ballyhale Shamrocks	3–10	19	5	3.80
6	Eugene O'Neill	Kilmessan	0–18	18	2	9.00
7	Frank Canning	St Gabriel's	2–11	17	3	5.66
7	Pat Moylan	Blackrock	2–11	17	4	4.25
9	Éamonn O'Sullivan	Blackrock	4–04	6	4	4.00
10	Mickey Reynolds	Crumlin	4–03	15	3	5.00

=== Miscellaneous ===
- Blackrock became the first team to win three All-Ireland titles. John Horgan was the captain for all three victories, making him the only three-time All-Ireland-winning captain.
