= 1973 Cork Senior Hurling Championship =

Annual hurling competition season

- Dates: 8 April – 14 October 1973
- Teams: 18
- Champions: Blackrock (25th title); John Horgan (captain)
- Runners-up: Glen Rovers; Denis Coughlan (captain)

Tournament statistics
- Matches played: 16
- Goals scored: 96 (6 per match)
- Points scored: 264 (16.5 per match)
- Top scorer(s): Tom Buckley (2-22)

The 1973 Cork Senior Hurling Championship was the 85th staging of the Cork Senior Hurling Championship since its establishment by the Cork County Board in 1887. The draw for the opening fixtures took place on 28 January 1973. The championship began on 8 April 1973 ended on 14 October 1973.

Glen Rovers entered the championship as the defending champions.

The final was played on 14 October 1973 at the Athletic Grounds in Cork, between Blackrock and Glen Rovers, in what was their first meeting in the final in 14 years. Blackrock won the match by 2–12 to 2–10 to claim their 25th championship title overall and a first title in two years.

Tom Buckley was the championship's top scorer with 2-22.

== Format ==
At the Cork County Convention on 28 January 1973, it was decided to introduce a system of seeding. As a result of this the four semi-finalists from the 1972 championship were automatically guaranteed a place in the second round.

== Team changes ==
=== To Championship ===
Promoted from the Cork Intermediate Hurling Championship

- Mallow

== Results ==
=== First round ===
8 April 1973 First round	Mallow	1-11 - 4-05	St. Vincent's	Blarney
	P Buckley 0-7, P Carey 1-0, T Sheehan 0-1, É O'Sullivan 0-1, D Coakley 0-1, B Barrett 0-1.		B O'Neill 2-1, J Helay 1-0, T Virgo 1-0, N Barry 0-2, J Russell 0-2.	Referee: T Daly (Commercials)

15 April 1973 First round	University College Cork	3-08 - 3-05	Seandún	Cork Athletic Grounds
	H O'Sullivan 1-2, W Vericker 1-1, T O'Sullivan 1-0, J O'Grady 0-2, F McCarthy 0-2, J Buckley 0-1.		T McAuliffe 1-1, N Collins 1-0, P O'Connell 1-0, V Twomey 0-2, J Nodwell 0-1, J Atkins 0-1.	Referee: D O'Brien (Cobh)

=== Second round ===
Na Piarsaigh	w/o - scr.	Duhallow

8 April 1973 Second round	Avondhu	4-10 - 3-04	Sarsfields	Páirc Mac Gearilt
	S Fitzgibbon 2-1, F O'Sullivan 1-1, J Keane 1-0, K McSweeney 0-3, P Morrissey 0-3, P Noonan 0-1, T Condon 0-1.		B Murphy 2-1, B Cotter 1-0, E Kelleher 0-3.	Referee: P Cronin (St. Finbarr's)

15 April 1973 Second round	Glen Rovers	4-20 - 2-04	Nemo Rangers	The Mardyke
	L McAuliffe 2-3, T Buckley 0-8, M Ryan 1-3, J Young 1-2, JJ O'Neill 0-2, P Harte 0-2.		D Calnan 2-2, S Coughlan 0-1, T Moloney 0-1.	Referee: P Cronin (St. Finbarr's)

22 April 1973 Second round	St. Finbarr's	4-08 - 1-03	Muskerry	Charlie Hurley Park
	S Gillen 1-5, J Barry-Murphy 2-0, G McCarthy 1-2, C McCarthy 0-1.		T Ryan 1-1, T O'Mahony 0-2.	Referee: F Murphy (Blackrock)

22 April 1973 Second round	Carrigdhoun	6-09 - 4-09	Passage	Carrigaline
	G Hanley 1-4, J Foster 2-0, F Coleman 1-1, G Webb 1-1, D Coleman 1-0, JK Coleman 0-2, B Coleman 0-1.		J McCarthy 1-3, P McCarthy 1-3, K Keane 1-0, D Keane 1-0, B Meade 0-3.	Referee: P Cronin (St. Finbarr's)

29 April 1973 Second round	University College Cork	3-07 - 3-05	St. Vincent's	Cork Athletic Grounds
	H O'Sullivan 3-1, P McCarthy 0-2, D O'Grady 0-2, J Buckley 0-1, S Looney 0-1.		C O'Shea 3-1, D Lenihan 0-2, A Russell 0-1, J Healy 0-1.	Referee: P Cronin (St. Finbarr's)

6 May 1973 Second round	Youghal	4-11 - 4-09	Carbery	Cork Athletic Grounds
	S O'Leary 3-2, N Hogan 1-3, F Cooper 0-2, A O'Regan 0-1, J Griffin 0-1, H Fuohy 0-1, W Walsh 0-1.		N Crowley 1-5, V Donovan 2-0, J Gabriel 1-2, P Flynn 0-2.	Referee: M Walsh (Mayfield)

6 May 1973 Second round	Blackrock	4-13 - 3-06	Imokilly	Cork Athletic Grounds
	É O'Donoghue 1-4, P Moylan 1-3, R Cummins 1-1, N Keeffe 1-1, D Prendergast 0-3, J Norberg 0-1.		T Meaney 1-1, S Farrell 1-0, P Barry 1-0, W Glavin 0-2, M SHeehan 0-1, T Canavan 0-1, D Clifford 0-1.	Referee: P Cronin (St. Finbarr's)

=== Quarter-finals ===
20 May 1973 Quarter-final	Youghal	3-08 - 2-08	University College Cork	Riverstown
	S O'Leary 1-4, F Cooper 2-0, F Keane 0-3, R O'Sullivan 0-1.		J Buckley 1-3, J O'Grady 0-4, D O'Grady 1-0, H O'Sullivan 0-1.	Referee: M Walsh (Mayfield)

9 June 1973 Quarter-final	St. Finbarr's	5-16 - 2-08	Na Piarsaigh	Cork Athletic Grounds
	G McCarthy 0-8, J Barry-Murphy 2-1, S Canty 2-0, S Gillen 0-5, C Cullinane 1-1, T Butler 0-1.		S Twomey 1-3, R Whitley 1-0, J Sullivan 0-2, M Kennefick 0-2, V Twomey 0-1.	Referee: D O'Brien (Cobh)

10 June 1973 Quarter-final	Glen Rovers	4-08 - 0-03	Avondhu	Clonmult Memorial Park
	JJ O'Neill 1-4, P Harte 1-3, T Buckley 1-1, J Young 1-0.		J Collins 0-3.	Referee: D O'Brien (Cobh)

20 May 1973 Quarter-final	Blackrock	2-14 - 1-11	Carrigdhoun	Manning Park
	R Cummins 2-3, P Moylan 0-6, É O'Donoghue 0-3, F Cummins 0-1, D Collins 0-1.		T Fogarty 1-3, D Coleman 0-3, F Coleman 0-2, G Hanley 0-1, B Coleman 0-1, JK Coleman 0-1.	Referee: D O'Brien (Cobh)

=== Semi-finals ===
22 July 1973 Semi-final	Blackrock	3-11 - 2-05	Youghal	Páirc Uí Chonaill
	R Cummins 2-1, P Moylan 0-6, É O'Donoghue 1-1, D Collins 0-2, B Dillon 0-1.		W Doyle 1-1, F Keane 1-0, N Hogan 0-2, S O'Leary 0-2.	Referee: P Cronin (St. Finbarr's)

26 August 1973 Semi-final	Glen Rovers	4-13 - 3-10	St. Finbarr's	Cork Athletic Grounds
	T Buckley 1-8, J Young 1-2, P Harte 1-1, M Ryan 1-1, P Doherty 0-1.		G McCarthy 1-2, S Gillen 1-1, J Barry-Murphy 1-0, B Wiley 0-2, C McCarthy 0-2, M Archer 0-1, J O'Shea 0-1.	Referee: F Murphy (Blackrock)

=== Final ===
14 October 1973 Final	Blackrock	2-12 - 2-10	Glen Rovers	Cork Athletic Grounds
	D Collins 1-5, É O'Donoghue 1-1, D Prendergast, N O'Keeffe, F Cummins, R Cummins, J Horgan and J O'Halloran 0-1 each.		L McAuliffe 2-0, T Buckley 0-5, R Crowley 0-2, P Harte, M Ryan and M Corbett 0-1 each.	Attendance: 14,046

== Championship statistics ==
=== Top scorers ===
Top scorers overall

Rank	Player	Club	Tally	Total	Matches	Average
1	Tom Buckley	Glen Rovers	2-22	28	4	7.00
2	Ray Cummins	Blackrock	5-06	21	4	5.25
3	Seánie O'Leary	Youghal	4-08	20	3	6.66
4	Éamonn O'Donoghue	Blackrock	3-09	18	4	4.50
4	Gerald McCarthy	St. Finbarr's	2-12	18	3	6.00
4	Pat Moylan	Blackrock	1-15	18	4	4.50
7	Séamus Gillen	St. Finbarr's	2-11	17	3	5.66
8	Jimmy Barry-Murphy	St. Finbarr's	5-01	16	3	5.33
8	Henry O'Sullivan	UCC	4-04	16	3	5.33
10	Liam McAuliffe	Glen Rovers	4-03	15	4	3.75

Top scorers in a single game

Rank	Player	Club	Tally	Total	Opposition
1	Seánie O'Leary	Youghal	3-02	11	Carbery
1	Tom Buckley	Glen Rovers	1-08	11	St. Finbarr's
3	Henry O'Sullivan	UCC	3-01	10	St. Vincent's
3	Christy O'Shea	St. Vincent's	3-01	10	UCC
5	Liam McAuliffe	Glen Rovers	2-03	9	Nemo Rangers
5	Ray Cummins	Blackrock	2-03	9	Carrigdhoun
7	Dan Calnan	Nemo Rangers	2-02	8	Glen Rovers
7	Séamus Gillen	St. Finbarr's	1-05	8	Muskerry
7	Donie Collins	Blackrock	1-05	8	Glen Rovers
7	Noel Crowley	Carbery	1-05	8	Youghal
7	Tom Buckley	Glen Rovers	0-08	8	Nemo Rangers
7	Gerald McCarthy	St. Finbarr's	0-08	8	Na Piarsaigh

=== Miscellaneous ===
- The final is the last to be played at the Cork Athletic Grounds.
