= Éamonn O'Donoghue (hurler) =

Irish hurler

Personal information
- Native name: Éamonn Ó Donnchú (Irish)
- Born: 5 February 1951 (age 75) Blackrock, Cork, Ireland
- Occupation: Business manager
- Height: 6 ft 2 in (188 cm)

Sport
- Sport: Hurling
- Position: Left corner-forward
Club
- Years: Club
- 1971–1989: Blackrock
Club titles
- Cork titles: 5
- Munster titles: 4
- All-Ireland Titles: 2
Inter-county
Years	County	Apps (scores)
1974–1983	Cork	17 (7–13)
Inter-county titles
- Munster titles: 6
- All-Irelands: 2
- NHL: 3
- All Stars: 0

Éamonn O'Donoghue (born 5 February 1951 in Blackrock, Cork, Ireland) is an Irish former sportsperson. He played hurling with his local club Blackrock and was a member of the Cork senior inter-county team from 1974 until 1983.

== Playing career ==
=== Club ===
O'Donoghue first came to prominence as a member of the hugely successful Blackrock minor team of the late sixties. In all he won three successive minor championship medals as Blackrock secured a remarkable four-in-a-row between 1966 and 1969.

By 1973 O'Donoghue had become a key member of the Blackrock senior team and lined out in his first championship decider. A 2–12 to 2–10 defeat of Glen Rovers gave him his first championship medal. A subsequent two-point defeat of Newmarket-on-Fergus in the provincial decider gave O'Donoghue a first Munster medal. The subsequent All-Ireland final pitted Blackrock against Rathnure. A rousing draw was followed by a great replay. Superb late goals by Donie Collins and O'Donoghue secured a 3–8 to 1–9 victory and a first All-Ireland medal.

Back-to-back championship titles eluded the Rockies, however, a 4–11 to 0–10 defeat of Glen Rovers in 1975 gave O'Donoghue a second championship medal. He later added a second Munster medal to his collection following a decisive 8–12 to 3–8 defeat of Mount Sion. Kilkenny's James Stephen provided the opposition in the subsequent All-Ireland final. Five points down at half-time, the Kilkenny club came storming back and defeated O'Donoghue's side by 2–10 to 2–4.

It was 1978 before O'Donoghue enjoyed his next success. A 4–12 to 1–7 defeat of Glen Rovers gave him a third championship medal. Once again the Rockies stormed through the provincial championship and defeated Newmarket-on-Fergus by two goals, giving O'Donoghue a third Munster medal. The All-Ireland final saw Cork take on Kilkenny again. This time it was Blackrock versus Ballyhale Shamrocks. Ray Cummins scored two goals in rapid succession in the opening thirty minutes to put Blackrock in the driving seat. At the full-time whistle Blackrock were the winners by 5–7 to 5–5, giving O'Donoghue a third All-Ireland medal as captain.

A 2–14 to 2–6 defeat of St. Finbarr's in 1979 gave O'Donoghgue his fourth championship medal. It was the first time that Blackrock had won back-to-back championships in almost fifty years. In a similar sequence of events to previous years the club later defeated Dunhill of Waterford to take the Munster club title. It was O'Donoghue's fourth Munster medal.

The next few seasons saw Blackrock go into decline. The club lost the 1982 county final to St. Finbarr's, however, three years later in 1985 O'Donoghue's side triumphed once again. A 1–14 to 1–8 victory gave him a fifth county title. O'Donoghue bowed out of club hurling shortly after this victory.

=== Inter-county ===
O'Donoghue first came to prominence on the inter-county scene as a member of the Cork senior team in the early 1970s. His first success came in 1974 when Cork trounced Limerick by 6–13 to 1–12 to take the National Hurling League title. O'Donoghue later made his championship debut against Waterford, however, the year ended without any championship success.

Over the next few seasons O'Donoghue remained a fringe player on the Cork team. He came on as a substitute in the All-Ireland final of 1976 as the team battled back from being eight points down to secure a 2–21 to 4–11 defeat of Wexford. It was O'Donoghue's first All-Ireland winners' medal.

Two years later in 1978 O'Donoghue was introduced as a substitute in Cork's narrow 0–13 to 0–11 win over Clare in the provincial decider. It was his first Munster medal on the field of play. This victory paved the way for Cork to take on Kilkenny in the subsequent All-Ireland final. The stakes were high as Cork were attempting to capture a first three in-a-row since 1954. The game, however, was not the classic that many expected. Cork were never really troubled over the course of the seventy minutes and a Jimmy Barry-Murphy goal helped the team to a 1–15 to 2–8 victory over their age-old rivals. O'Donoghue was once again introduced as a substitute. It was his second All-Ireland medal.

After failing to secure an elusive four-in-a-row in 1979 a number of key players retired. O'Donoghue remained as Cork secured back-to-back National League titles in 1980 and 1981.

By 1982 Cork returned to the big time with a new team. O'Donoghue remained on the fringes once again, however, he collected his second Munster medal on the field of play after coming on as a substitute in Cork's 5–31 to 3–6 drubbing of Waterford. The subsequent All-Ireland final pitted Cork against Kilkenny, with 'the Rebels' installed as the red-hot favourites. All did not go to plan as Kilkenny dominated. O'Donoghue was sprung from the bench again, however, Christy Heffernan was the hero of the day as he scored two goals in a forty-second spell just before half-time. Ger Fennelly captured a third goal in the second half as Kilkenny completely trounced 'the Rebels' by 3–18 to 1–15.

O'Donoghue claimed a third Munster medal in 1983 as Waterford fell heavily by 3–22 to 0–12 for the second consecutive year. After defeating Galway in the All-Ireland semi-final Cork squared up to Kilkenny in the All-Ireland final for the second year in-a-row. O'Donoghue was on the starting fifteen in a championship final for the first time in his career. Once again Kilkenny dominated the game, assisted by a strong wind in the first-half, and hung on in the face of a great fight-back by Cork. At the full-time whistle Kilkenny emerged victorious by 2–14 to 2–12. For the second consecutive year O'Donoghue ended up on the losing side on All-Ireland final day. He retired from inter-county hurling following this defeat.

=== Inter-provincial ===
O'Donoghue was also selected for duty with Munster in the inter-provincial series of games. He was first picked for his province in 1976 and was named captain for the year. After a one-point win over Connacht, O'Donoghue's team lined out against Leinster in the final. That game was also a close affair, however, Munster triumphed by 4–9 to 4–8. It was O'Donoghue's first Railway Cup medal.

After a hiatus of five years O'Donoghue was back with Munster again in 1981. The team stormed to the Railway Cup title following a 5–13 to 1–8 rout of Ulster and a ten-point win over fierce rivals Leinster.

O'Donoghue retained his place on the Munster team for 1982, however, his side were defeated by Connacht in the semi-final.

.

== Honours ==
Blackrock

- All-Ireland Senior Club Hurling Championship: 1974, 1979
- Munster Senior Club Hurling Championship: 1973, 1975, 1978, 1979
- Cork Senior Hurling Championship: 1973, 1975, 1978, 1979, 1985
- City Junior A Hurling Championship: 1970
- Cork Minor Hurling Championship: 1967, 1968, 1969

Cork

- All-Ireland Senior Hurling Championship: 1976, 1978
- Munster Senior Hurling Championship: 1975, 1976, 1978, 1979, 1982, 1983
- National Hurling League: 1973–74, 1979–80, 1980–81

Munster

- Railway Cup: 1976 (c), 1981

Achievements
Preceded by Pat Delaney	Railway Cup Hurling Final winning captain 1976	Succeeded by Tony Doran
