= 1969 All-Ireland Under-21 Football Championship =

Gaelic football competition

Championship details

All-Ireland Champions
- Winning team: Antrim (1st win)
- Captain: Liam Boyle

All-Ireland Finalists
- Losing team: Roscommon

Provincial Champions
- Munster: Cork
- Leinster: Laois
- Ulster: Antrim
- Connacht: Roscommon

The 1969 All-Ireland Under-21 Football Championship was the sixth staging of the All-Ireland Under-21 Football Championship since its establishment by the Gaelic Athletic Association in 1964.

Derry entered the championship as the defending champions, however, they were defeated in the Ulster Championship.

On 14 September 1969, Antrim won the championship following a 1-8 to 0-10 defeat of Roscommon in the All-Ireland final. This was their first and only All-Ireland title.

== Results ==
=== All-Ireland Under-21 Football Championship ===
Semi-finals

24 August 1969 Semi-final	Roscommon	2-15 - 0-09	Laois	Dr. Hyde Park, Roscommon

31 August 1969 Semi-final	Cork	1-12 - 3-07	Antrim	Cork Athletic Grounds, Cork

Final

14 September 1969 Final	Antrim	1-08 - 0-10	Roscommon	Croke Park, Dublin

== Statistics ==
=== Miscellaneous ===
- Laois win the Leinster title for the first time in their history.
