= Kevin Cummins (hurler) =

Irish hurler

Kevin Cummins (born 1946 in Ballinlough, Cork) is a former Irish sportsperson. He played hurling with his local club Blackrock and was a member of the Cork minor hurling team in the 1960s. Cummins captained Cork to the All-Ireland title at minor level in 1964. He is the brother of Brendan and Ray Cummins, who both went on to play for Cork at senior level in the 1970s. While in University College Cork - 1966/1970 - he won a Fitzgibbon Cup medal for inter-varsity hurling. He was a member of the teaching staff of Coláiste Chríost Rí - a boys' secondary school in Cork City - from 1970 to 1996 and gained a reputation as a successful football coach, winning numerous Munster and All-Ireland titles with the college. On leaving teaching in 1996 he joined his brother, Brendan, in the family business, Cummins Sports Ltd. and is managing director.

Preceded by Willie Bernie (Wexford)	All-Ireland Minor Hurling Final winning captain 1964	Succeeded by Liam Martin (Dublin)
