= Pat Moylan (Cork hurler) =

Irish hurler

Personal information
- Native name: Pádraig Ó Maoileáin (Irish)
- Born: 20 January 1949 (age 77) Blackrock, County Cork, Ireland
- Height: 5 ft 9 in (175 cm)

Sport
- Sport: Hurling
- Position: Half-forward
Club
Years	Club	Apps (scores)
1967-1989	Blackrock	82 (16-289)
Club titles
- Cork titles: 6
- Munster titles: 5
- All-Ireland Titles: 3
Inter-county
Years	County	Apps (scores)
1970–1981	Cork	14 (1–23)
Inter-county titles
- Munster titles: 3
- All-Irelands: 3
- NHL: 2
- All Stars: 1

Pat Moylan (born 20 January 1949) is an Irish former hurler who played as a midfielder at senior level for the Cork county team.

Moylan joined the team during the 1970 championship and was a regular member of the starting fifteen until his retirement after the 1981 championship. During that time he won three All-Ireland medals, three Munster medals, two National League medals and one All-Star award.

At club level Moylan was a three-time All-Ireland medalist with Blackrock. In addition to this he has also won five Munster medals and five county club championship medals.

== Playing career ==
=== Club ===
Moylan played his club hurling with Blackrock and enjoyed much success in club's of the most successful decade.

In 1971 he lined out in his first senior decider as Blackrock faced St. Finbarr's. After a decade in the doldrums the Rockies were back and a 2–19 to 5–4 victory secured a championship medal for Moylan. Blackrock subsequently represented Cork in the provincial series of games and faced Moyne-Templetuohy in the decider. An impressive 4–10 to 3–1 victory gave Moylan a Munster medal. The subsequent All-Ireland decider pitted Blackrock against Rathnure. A high-scoring game followed, however, a narrow 5–13 to 6–9 victory gave Moylan an All-Ireland Senior Club Hurling Championship medal.

Blackrock surrendered their club, provincial and All-Ireland decider the following year, however, in 1973 Moylan lined out in a second county championship final. A 2–12 to 2–10 defeat of Glen Rovers gave him a second championship medal. A subsequent two-point defeat of Newmarket-on-Fergus in the provincial decider gave Moylan a second Munster medal. The subsequent All-Ireland final pitted Blackrock against Rathnure. A rousing draw was followed by a great replay. Superb late goals by Donie Collins and Éamonn O'Donoghue secured a 3–8 to 1–9 victory and a second All-Ireland medal for Moylan.

Once again back-to-back championship titles eluded the Rockies, however, a 4–11 to 0–10 defeat of Glen Rovers in 1975 gave Moylan a third championship medal. He later added a third Munster medal to his collection following a decisive 8–12 to 3–8 defeat of Mount Sion. Kilkenny's James Stephen provided the opposition in the subsequent All-Ireland final. Five points down at half-time, the Kilkenny club came storming back and defeated Moylan's side by 2–10 to 2–4.

It was 1978 before Moylan enjoyed his next success. A 4–12 to 1–7 defeat of Glen Rovers gave him a fourth championship medal. Once again the Rockies stormed through the provincial championship and defeated Newmarket-on-Fergus by two goals, giving Moylan a fourth Munster medal. The All-Ireland final saw Cork take on Kilkenny again. This time it was Blackrock versus Ballyhale Shamrocks. Ray Cummins scored two goals in rapid succession in the opening thirty minutes to put Blackrock in the driving seat. At the full-time whistle Blackrock were the winners by 5–7 to 5–5, giving Moylan a third All-Ireland medal.

A 2–14 to 2–6 defeat of St. Finbarr's in 1979 gave Moylan his fifth and final championship medal. It was the first time that Blackrock had won back-to-back championships in almost fifty years. He later picked up a fifth Munster medal following a 0–13 to 1–8 defeat of Dunhill.

=== Minor and under-21 ===
Moylan first came to prominence on the inter-county scene as a member of the Cork minor hurling team in 1966. He made his debut in the provincial quarter-final that year and subsequently collected a Munster medal following a 6–7 to 2–8 defeat of Galway. Cork later faced Wexford in the All-Ireland decider, however, a high-scoring 6–7 apiece draw was the result. The replay was much more conclusive with Wexford claiming a 4–1 to 1–8 victory.

In 1967 Moylan added a second Munster medal to his collection in the minor grade following a 4–10 to 0–3 rout of Limerick. Cork later faced Wexford in the All-Ireland decider once again. A 2–15 to 5–3 victory gave Moylan an All-Ireland Minor Hurling Championship medal, while he also had the honour of collecting the cup as captain of the team.

Moylan progressed onto the Cork under-21 team in 1968 and enjoyed immediate success on one of the most successful teams of all-time in that grade. Tipperary were bested by 4–10 to 1–13 to secure a first Munster medal. Moylan was later at midfield for the All-Ireland decider against Kilkenny. A 2–18 to 3–9 victory gave him his first All-Ireland medal in that grade.

In 1969 Cork had an even more comprehensive victory over Tipp in the provincial decider and Moylan added a second Munster medal to his collection. Old rivals Wexford provided the opposition in the subsequent All-Ireland final and a high-scoring game ensued. A 5–13 to 4–7 victory gave Moylan a second consecutive All-Ireland medal.

Having retained the title, Cork set out to become the first team to win three successive under-21 championships. Moylan collected a third Munster medal that year following a 3–11 to 2–7 defeat of Tipperary once again. Cork faced their old rivals Wexford in the subsequent All-Ireland decider, however, that game ended in a draw. In the replay Cork went into overdrive and Moylan won a third All-Ireland medal following a 5–17 to 0–8 thrashing.

=== Senior ===
Moylan made his senior debut for Cork during the 1969–70 National League. It was a successful campaign for the Rebels as an aggregate 5–21 to 6–16 defeat of New York secured the National Hurling League title for Cork. Moylan was an unused substitute for the final. It would be a Munster semi-final defeat by Tipperary in 1973 before he made his championship debut.

After being dropped from the team for a number of seasons, 1976 saw Moylan win his first Munster medal as Limerick were beaten by 3–15 to 4–5. The subsequent All-Ireland final saw Cork face old rivals Wexford. In one of the worst starts to a championship decider, Cork were 2–2 to no score in arrears after just six minutes. The Rebels fought back to level matters by half-time, however, it was the long-range point-scoring by Moylan that turned the game for Cork. A 2–21 to 4–11 victory gave him his first All-Ireland medal. Moylan later collected an All-Star award.

Moylan missed Cork's 4–15 to 4–10 Munster final defeat of newly crowned National League champions Clare in 1977, however, he was introduced as a substitute in the All-Ireland decider against Wexford. Seánie O'Leary played the game with a broken nose after being hit in the face by a sliotar in a pre-match warm-up while the two oldest men on the team, Denis Coughlan and Gerald McCarthy, gave noteworthy displays. Martin Coleman made some miraculous saves in the dying minutes as Cork held on for a 1–17 to 3–8 victory. It was Moylan's second All-Ireland medal.

In 1978 Cork set out to secure an impressive third successive All-Ireland title. The team go off to a good start with Moylan, having been restored to the starting fifteen, collecting a second Munster medal after a 0–13 to 0–11 defeat of Clare in a dour provincial decider. This victory paved the way for Cork to take on Kilkenny in the subsequent All-Ireland final. The stakes were high as Cork were attempting to capture a first three in-a-row since 1954. The game, however, was not the classic that many expected. Cork were never really troubled over the course of the seventy minutes and a Jimmy Barry-Murphy goal helped the team to a 1–15 to 2–8 victory over their age-old rivals. This victory gave Cork a third All-Ireland title in succession and gave Moylan his own personal three-in-a-row of winners' medals.

In 1979 Cork set about capturing a record-equaling fourth successive All-Ireland. All went to plan as the Rebels secured a fifth consecutive provincial title following a 2–14 to 0–9 defeat of Limerick. It was Moylan's third and final Munster medal. Age and the exertions of the three previous campaigns finally caught up with Cork in the All-Ireland semi-final and a 2–14 to 1–13 defeat by Galway brought the four-in-a-row dream to an end.

A 4–15 to 4–6 defeat of Limerick in a replay of the National League final gave Moylan his first winners' medal in that competition in 1980. Cork later failed in their effort to secure a record sixth provincial title in succession. The following year Moylan enjoyed his final success with Cork, as a 3–11 to 2–8 defeat of an up-and-coming Offaly team secured his second National League medal. Cork exited the subsequent championship at the first hurdle and Moylan decided to retire from inter-county activity.

=== Inter-provincial ===
Moylan also had the honour of being selected for Munster in the inter-provincial series of games. He lined out for the province in 1977, however, arch rivals Leinster defeated Munster in the final of the Railway Cup.

== Honours ==
=== Team ===
Blackrock

- All-Ireland Senior Club Hurling Championship (3): 1972, 1974, 1979
- Munster Senior Club Hurling Championship (5): 1971, 1973, 1975, 1978, 1979
- Cork Senior Club Hurling Championship (6): 1971, 1973, 1975, 1978, 1979, 1985

Cork

- All-Ireland Senior Hurling Championship (3): 1976, 1977, 1978
- Munster Senior Hurling Championship (3): 1976, 1978, 1979
- National Hurling League (2): 1979–80, 1980–81
- All-Ireland Under-21 Hurling Championship (3): 1968, 1969, 1970
- Munster Under-21 Hurling Championship (3): 1968, 1969, 1970
- All-Ireland Minor Hurling Championship (1): 1967 (c)
- Munster Minor Hurling Championship (2): 1966, 1967 (c)

=== Individual ===
Awards

- All-Star Awards (1): 1976

Achievements
Preceded by Pat Bernie (Wexford)	All-Ireland Minor Hurling Final winning captain 1967	Succeeded by Tom Byrne (Wexford)
