= Brian Heffernan =

Irish hurler

Personal information
- Born: 1960 (age 65–66) Nenagh, County Tipperary, Ireland

Sport
- Sport: Hurling
- Position: Right wing-back
Club
- Years: Club
- Nenagh Éire Óg
Club titles
- Tipperary titles: 0
Inter-county*
Years	County	Apps (scores)
1984-1985	Tipperary	1 (0-00)
Inter-county titles
- Munster titles: 0
- All-Irelands: 0
- NHL: 0
- All Stars: 0
- *Inter County team apps and scores correct as of 12:45, 27 August 2021.

Brian Heffernan (born 1960) is an Irish former hurler. At club level he played with Nenagh Éire Óg and was also a member of the Tipperary senior hurling team. He usually lined out as a wing-back.

== Career ==
Heffernan first played juvenile and underage hurling with the Nenagh Éire Óg club before joining the club's top adult team. His performances for the club brought him to the attention of the Tipperary minor team selectors, and he had two seasons in that grade. Heffernan progressed onto the Tipperary under-21 team and won three consecutive All-Ireland Under-21 Championship titles from 1979 to 1981. He lined out with the Tipperary senior hurling team for two seasons but made his only championship appearance when he came on as a substitute for Pat Fitzelle in the 1984 Munster final defeat by Cork. His brother, John Heffernan, and his nephews, Mikey and Barry Heffernan, are All-Ireland Championship-winners with Tipperary.

== Honours ==
Tipperary

- All-Ireland Under-21 Hurling Championship: 1979, 1980, 1981
- Munster Under-21 Hurling Championship: 1979, 1980, 1981
