= Pat Fox =

Tipperary hurler

Personal information
- Born: 8 July 1961 (age 65) Annacarty, County Tipperary, Ireland
- Occupation: Publican
- Height: 5 ft 11 in (180 cm)

Sport
- Sport: Hurling
- Position: Right corner-forward
Club
- Years: Club
- 1979–2005: Éire Óg Annacarty
Club titles
- Tipperary titles: 0
Inter-county
Years	County	Apps (scores)
1980–1996	Tipperary	37 (13–98)
Inter-county titles
- Munster titles: 5
- All-Irelands: 2
- NHL: 2
- All Stars: 3

Patrick Fox (born 8 July 1961) is an Irish former hurling manager and player. At club level he played with Éire Óg Annacarty and at inter-county level was a member of the Tipperary senior hurling team.

== Club career ==
Fox began his career at juvenile and underage levels as a dual player with the Éire Óg Annacarty club before eventually progressing to adult level. He had his first senior success in 1981 when he won a West Tipperary SHC medal after a 0–14 to 0–7 win over Cappawhite in the final. Fox added a second West Tipperary SHC medal to his collection five years later in 1986. He top-scored with 1-01 in the 2-09 to 1-10 defeat of Golden–Kilfeacle. Fox's club career was drawing to a close when he won a Tipperary IHC title after a 0–9 to 1–5 win over Silvermines in 1994.

== Inter-county career ==
Fox began his inter-county career with Tipperary during a two-year tenure as a dual player at minor level in 1978 and 1979. He was in his final season as a minor when he was drafted onto the Tipperary under-21 team and ended the year with an All-Ireland U21HC medal after a 2–12 to 1–9 win over Galway in the final. It was the first of three successive winners' medals for Fox, as he was also involved when Kilkenny had All-Ireland final defeats in 1980 and 1981.

Fox joined the senior team in 1980 and made his debut in a Munster SHC semi-final defeat by Cork. He suffered a cruciate ligament injury in 1982, an injury which resulted in him being off the Tipperary team for the following two seasons. He played with Tipperary's junior team in 1984, before returning to the senior team a year later.

Fox won his first Munster SHC medal after a 4–22 to 1–22 extra-time defeat of Cork in 1987. He was the championship's overall top scorer that year with 3–45, while he also won his first All-Star award. Fox added a National Hurling League medal and a second consecutive Munster SHC medal to his collection the following year. He later lined out at wing-forward in the 1–15 to 0–14 defeat by Galway in the 1988 All-Ireland SHC final. Fox claimed a third successive Munster SHC medal in 1989. He later won his first All-Ireland SHC medal after scoring 1–2 from corner-forward in the 4–24 to 3–9 defeat of Antrim in the 1989 All-Ireland SHC final. Fox ended the season with a second All-Star award.

After surrendering their titles in 1990, Fox won a fourth Munster SHC medal in five seasons after a 4–19 to 4–15 defeat of Cork. He later claimed a second All-Ireland SHC medal after scoring five points and being named man of the match in the 1–16 to 0–15 defeat of Kilkenny in the 1991 All-Ireland SHC final. He ended the season with a third All-Star award, and was also named Hurler of the Year. Fox won a fifth and final Munster SHC medal in 1993. He added a second National Hurling League title to his collection in 1994, in what proved to be his last silverware with the Tipperary senior team. Fox retired from inter-county hurling following Tipperary's defeat by Limerick in the 1996 Munster SHC final replay.

== Inter-provincial career ==
Fox's performances at inter-county level resulted in his selection for Munster in their 1982 Railway Cup semi-final defeat by Connacht. It was the first of five appearances for the Munster team; however, all of them ended with semi-final defeats.

== Managerial career ==
Fox was in the twilight of his club career when he became involved in team management. He was player-manager with the Éire Óg Annacarty intermediate team in 2004.

== Honours ==
Éire Óg Annacarty

- West Tipperary Senior Hurling Championship: 1981, 1986
- Tipperary Intermediate Hurling Championship: 1994

Tipperary

- All-Ireland Senior Hurling Championship: 1989, 1991
- Munster Senior Hurling Championship: 1987, 1988, 1989, 1991, 1993
- National Hurling League: 1987–88, 1993–94
- All-Ireland Under-21 Hurling Championship: 1979, 1980, 1981
- Munster Under-21 Hurling Championship: 1979, 1980, 1981

Awards
Preceded by Tony O'Sullivan	Texaco Hurler of the Year; 1991	Succeeded by Brian Corcoran
