= Pat McGrath (Tipperary hurler) =

Irish hurler and Gaelic footballer

Personal information
- Native name: Pádraig Mac Craith (Irish)
- Born: 1961 (age 64–65) Loughmore, County Tipperary, Ireland

Sport
- Sport: Hurling
- Position: Left wing-back
Club
- Years: Club
- Loughmore–Castleiney
Club titles
	Football	Hurling
Tipperary titles	4	1
Inter-county*
Years	County	Apps (scores)
1981-1989	Tipperary	4 (0-04)
Inter-county titles
- Munster titles: 1
- All-Irelands: 1
- NHL: 0
- All Stars: 0
- *Inter County team apps and scores correct as of 12:10, 2 April 2018.

Pat McGrath (born 1961) is an Irish retired hurler and Gaelic footballer. His league and championship career with the Tipperary senior teams in both codes spanned nine seasons from 1981 to 1989.

Born in Loughmore, County Tipperary, McGrath was raised in a family that had a strong affinity for Gaelic games. His father, Mick McGrath, and his uncles, enjoyed county championship success with the Loughmore–Castleiney club in the 1950s.

McGrath attended Rockwell College while simultaneously coming to prominence at juvenile and underage levels with the Loughmore–Casteiney teams. As a dual player at senior level, he won a total of five county championship medals.

McGrath made his debut on the inter-county scene at the age of sixteen when he was selected for both Tipperary minor teams. He enjoyed three championship seasons as a dual player with the minor teams before subsequently joining the under-21 teams with whom he won back-to-back All-Ireland medals in 1980 and 1981. By this stage Ryan had also joined the Tipperary senior hurling team, before later joining the Tipperary senior football team. McGrath won his sole All-Ireland medal in 1989, having earlier collected a Munster medal.

McGrath's sons, Noel and John, are also All-Ireland medal winners with Tipperary.

== Honours ==
Loughmore–Castleiney

- Tipperary Senior Hurling Championship (1): 1988
- Tipperary Senior Football Championship (4): 1979, 1983, 1987, 1992

Tipperary

- All-Ireland Senior Hurling Championship (1): 1989
- Munster Senior Hurling Championship (1): 1989
- All-Ireland Under-21 Hurling Championship (2): 1980, 1981
- Munster Under-21 Hurling Championship (2): 1980, 1981
