= 1982 All-Ireland Under-21 Hurling Championship final =

1982 All-Ireland Under-21 Hurling Championship Final
- Event: 1982 All-Ireland Under-21 Hurling Championship
Cork	Galway
0-12	0-11
- Date: 12 September 1982
- Venue: St. Brendan's Park, Birr
- Referee: Gerry Kirwan (Offaly)

The 1982 All-Ireland Under-21 Hurling Championship final was a hurling match that was played at St. Brendan's Park, Birr on 12 September 1982 to determine the winners of the 1982 All-Ireland Under-21 Hurling Championship, the 19th season of the All-Ireland Under-21 Hurling Championship, a tournament organised by the Gaelic Athletic Association for the champion teams of the four provinces of Ireland. The final was contested by Cork of Munster and Galway of Connacht, with Cork winning by 0–12 to 0–11.

The All-Ireland final between Cork and Galway was the eighth championship meeting between the two teams but their first in an All-Ireland final. Cork were appearing in their first final since defeat in 1977, while Galway were appearing in their first final since 1979.

Having lost the senior All-Ireland decider to Kilkenny the previous week, Cork's under-21 team featured three players - Ger Cunningham, Kevin Hennessy and Tony O'Sullivan - who had played in that game. Both defences were in complete control in the first ever goalless final. The game hung in the balance throughout, with Cork coming from behind in the closing stages to win by a long-range Kevin Hennessy point.

Cork's All-Ireland victory was their first since 1976. The win gave them their eighth All-Ireland title overall and further secured their position as first on the all time roll of honour.

Galway's All-Ireland defeat was their second since last winning the title in 1978.

== Match ==
=== Details ===
12 September 1982

Cork	0-12 - 0-11	Galway
T O'Sullivan 0-4, T Coyne 0-2, D Walsh 0-2, K Hennessy 0-2, M O'Sullivan 0-1, M Brosnan 0-1.		M Haverty 0-5, P Murphy 0-3, J Murphy 0-2, M McGrath 0-1.

St. Brendan's Park, Birr
Referee: G Kirwan (Offaly)

Cork	Galway
