= 1980–81 National Hurling League =

50th season of the National Hurling League

League details
- Dates: 12 October 1980 – 3 May 1981

League champions
- Winners: Cork (12th win)
- Captain: Dónal O'Grady
- Manager: Gerald McCarthy

League runners-up
- Runners-up: Offaly
- Captain: Pádraig Horan
- Manager: Dermot Healy

The 1980–81 National Hurling League was the 50th season of the National Hurling League (NHL), an annual hurling competition for the GAA county teams. It was won by Cork.

== Division 1 ==
=== Structure ===
The National Hurling League's top division was divided into two groups - 1A and 1B. The top two teams in Division 1A advance to the semi-finals. The third- and fourth-placed teams in 1A, as well as the top two from 1B, play in the quarter-finals.

=== Division 1A table ===
Pos	Team	Pld	W	D	L	Pts	Notes
1	Cork	6	5	1	0	11	Division 1 champions
2	Offaly	6	4	1	1	9	Division 1 runners-up
3	Tipperary	6	2	2	2	6	
4	Waterford	6	2	1	3	5	
5	Galway	6	2	1	3	5	
6	Wexford	6	2	1	3	5	Relegated to Division 1B
7	Limerick	6	0	1	5	1	Relegated to Division 1B

=== Group stage ===
12 October 1980	Galway	3-7 - 2-12	Offaly	Pearse Stadium, Galway
	F Gantley 2-1, N Lane 1-1, S Silke 0-2, F Burke 0-1, PJ Molloy 0-1, Joe Connolly 0-1.		T Conneely 1-1, J Flaherty 0-4, P Kirwan 1-0, P Delaney 0-3, B Bermingham 0-2, F Carroll 0-1, M Corrigan 0-1.	Attendance: 6,000; Referee: J O'Grady (Limerick)

12 October 1980	Waterford	1-10 - 5-8	Tipperary	Walsh Park, Waterford
	P Daly 1-0, R O'Brien 0-3, E Rockett 0-3, P McGrath 0-2, M Whelan 0-1, M Walsh 0-1.		J Stone 3-1, S Bourke 1-2, É O'Shea 1-2, L McGrath 0-2, K Fox 0-1.	Referee: L Horgan (Cork)

26 October 1980	Wexford	1-7 - 4-12	Cork	O'Kennedy Park, New Ross
	S Kinsella 1-1, N Buggy 0-3, M Quigley 0-1, J Murphy 0-1, M Casey 0-1.		D Buckley 1-2, V Twomey 1-2, A Coyne 1-1, J Barry-Murphy 1-0, E Crowley 0-4, P Moylen 0-1, T Cashman 0-1, T Crowley 0-1.	Attendance: 1,700; Referee: JJ Landers (Waterford)

9 November 1980	Cork	6-13 - 1-9	Waterford	Páirc Mac Gearailt, Fermoy
	É O'Donoghue 2-0, P Horgan 1-3, J Fenton 1-3, J Barry-Murphy 1-2, D Buckley 1-1, J Cremin 0-2, T Coyne 0-1, P Crowley 0-1.		P Daly 1-0, M Walsh 0-3, T Maher 0-3, S Breen 0-1, P Egan 0-1, P Ryan 0-1.	Referee: G Ryan (Tipperary)

9 November 1980	Tipperary	3-8 - 0-17	Galway	Semple Stadium, Thurles
	S Bourke 3-4, É O'Shea 0-2, L McGrath 0-1, M Doyle 0-1.		Joe Connolly 0-7, N Lane 0-3, F Gantley 0-2, S Mahon 0-2, P Ryan 0-1, S Linnane 0-1, PJ Molloy 0-1.	Referee: N Dalton (Waterford)

9 November 1980	Limerick	4-6 - 2-14	Offaly	Gaelic Grounds, Limerick
	J McKenna 2-3, O O'Connor 1-1, É Grimes 0-1.		P Horan 1-4, T Kennelly 1-0, P Carroll 0-2, P Kirwan 0-2, J Kelly 0-2, P Delaney 0-2, M Corrigan 0-1, D Owens 0-1.	Referee: N O'Driscoll (Clare)

23 November 1980	Galway	0-14 - 3-10	Cork	Ballinasloe
	Joe Connolly 0-6, G Curtin 0-2, S Silke 0-2, B Forde 0-2, F Gantley 0-1, N Lane 0-1.		J Barry-Murphy 1-2, P Moylan 1-0, P Horgan 1-0, J Fenton 0-3, T Crowley 0-2, É O'Donoghue 0-1, J Horgan 0-1, P Crowley 0-1.	Referee: N O'Donoghue (Dublin)

23 November 1980	Waterford	1-8 - 1-6	Wexford	Fraher Field, Dungarvan
	P McGrath 1-2, R O'Brien 0-2, E Rockett 0-1, S Breen 0-1, P Daly 0-1, T Maher 0-1.		T Doran 1-1, N Buggy 0-3, J Murphy 0-1, S Kinsella 0-1.	Referee: F Murphy (Cork)

23 November 1980	Limerick	2-6 - 1-13	Tipperary	Gaelic Grounds, Limerick
	É Cregan 1-2, T Quaid 1-0, M Rea 0-2, W Fitzmaurice 0-1, J Carroll 0-1.		P Fox 0-4, S Bourke 0-4, M Doyle 1-0, B ryan 0-2, P McGrath 0-1, T Barry 0-1, G Williams 0-1.	Referee: J Woods (Clare)

7 December 1980	Tipperary	1-7 - 0-13	Offaly	Semple Stadium, Thurles
	S Bourke 1-4, M Doyle 0-2, P Fox 0-1.		M Corrigan 0-5, P Horan 0-4, S O'Meara 0-2, P Kirwan 0-1, B Keeshan 0-1.	Referee: JJ Landers (Waterford)

7 December 1980	Limerick	0-10 - 0-14	Cork	Gaelic Grounds, Limerick
	É Cregan 0-6, T Quaid 0-2, O O'Connor 0-1, J McKenna 0-1.		J Fenton 0-4, J Barry-Murphy 0-3, P Horgan 0-3, P Crowley 0-2, É O'Donoghue 0-1, J Cremin 0-1.	Referee: G Ryan (Tipperary)

7 December 1980	Wexford	2-10 - 1-11	Galway	Wexford Park, Wexford
	S Kinsella 0-5, M Casey 1-1, J Fleming 1-0, G O'Connor 0-2, T Doran 0-1, M Quigley 0-1.		F Gantley 1-5, Joe Connolly 0-2, N Lane 0-2, B Forde 0-1, S Silke 0-1.	Referee: N O'Donoghue (Dublin)

8 February 1981	Cork	0-10 - 0-7	Offaly	Páirc Uí Chaoimh, Cork
	É O'Donoghue 0-3, P Horgan 0-2, P Crowley 0-2, J Barry-Murphy 0-1, J Fenton 0-1, P Moylan 0-1.		M Corrigan 0-3, P Horan 0-1, P Kirwan 0-1, G Coughlan 0-1, P Carroll 0-1.	Referee: G Ryan (Tipperary)

8 February 1981	Galway	2-13 - 1-10	Waterford	Ballinasloe
	N Lane 1-2, Joe connolly 0-4, B Forde 0-3, I Clarke 0-2, PJ Molloy 0-2.		E Rockett 1-0, J Galvin 1-0 (og), P McGrath 0-3, M Walsh 0-2, P Curran 0-2, T Casey 0-1, M Whelan 0-1, T Maher 0-1.	Referee: N O'Donnell (Clare)

22 February 1981	Cork	1-7 - 1-7	Tipperary	Páirc Uí Chaoimh, Cork
	J Barry-Murphy 1-0, P Horgan 0-2, T Crowley 0-2, J Fenton 0-2, P Crowley 0-1.		P Queally 1-2, S Bourke 0-2, P Ryan 0-1, É O'Shea 0-1, K Fox 0-1.	Referee: J Moore (Waterford)

22 February 1981	Wexford	1-14 - 2-12	Offaly	Enniscorthy
	S Kinsella 0-5, J Murphy 0-4, J McDonald 1-0, G O'Connor 0-2, T Doran 0-1, M Jacob 0-1, P Courtney 0-1.		P Horan 1-2, P Delaney 0-5, M Corrigan 1-0, D Owens 0-2, P Carroll 0-2, B Bermingham 0-1.	Referee: G Ryan (Tipperary)

22 February 1981	Waterford	4-13 - 5-6	Limerick	Fraher Field, Dungarvan
	T Casey 1-9, P Daly 2-0, L Ahern 1-0, P Curran 0-3, T Maher 0-1.		É Cregan 2-1, J McKenna 2-0, M Rea 1-0, W Fitzmaurice 0-1, S Foley 0-1, J Carroll 0-1, David Punch 0-1, O O'Connor 0-1.	Referee: L Horgan (Cork)

8 March 1981	Waterford	2-9 - 1-12	Offaly	Fraher Field, Dungarvan
	S Breen 1-2, P McGrath 1-1, T Casey 0-3, T Maher 0-2, P Daly 0-1.		M Corrigan 1-1, P Horan 0-3, J Kelly 0-3, P Delaney 0-2, P Carroll 0-2, P Kirwan 0-1.	Referee: J Denton (Wexford)

8 March 1981	Limerick	2-5 - 0-12	Galway	FitzGerald Park, Kilmallock
	É Cregan 1-3, J McKenna 1-0, J Flanagan 0-1, W Fitzmaurice 0-1.		Joe Connolly 0-4, I Clarke 0-3, G Curtin 0-3, PJ Molloy 0-1, F Gantley 0-1.	Referee: J Moloney (Limerick)

8 March 1981	Tipperary	3-10 - 3-11	Wexford	Semple Stadium, Thurles
	S Bourke 2-3, P Queally 1-0, P McGrath 0-2, É O'Shea 0-2, T Barry 0-1, K Fox 0-1, M Doyle 0-1.		N Buggy 1-7, T Doran 2-1, J Murphy 0-2, S Kinsella 0-1.	Referee: F Murphy (Cork)

15 March 1981	Limerick	3-9 - 2-12	Wexford	Gaelic Grounds, Limerick
	É Cregan 2-5, J McKenna 1-2, O O'Connor 0-1, T Burke 0-1.		N Buggy 1-5, S Kinsella 1-3, J Meyler 0-3, M Quigley 0-1.	Referee: N O'Donoghue (Dublin)

=== Division 1B table ===
Pos	Team	Pld	W	D	L	Pts	Notes
1	Clare	6	5	0	1	11	Promoted to Division 1A
2	Laois	6	5	0	1	11	Promoted to Division 1A
3	Kilkenny	6	4	1	1	9	
4	Westmeath	6	2	1	3	5	
5	Dublin	6	2	1	3	5	
6	Antrim	6	1	0	5	2	
7	Kerry	6	0	1	5	1	

=== Group stage ===
12 October 1980	Westmeath	1-10 - 2-11	Clare	Castletown Geoghegan
	M Kilcoyne 0-4, J Fitzsimons 1-0, J Lynch 0-2, D Kilcoyne 0-2, M Ryan 0-1, W Lowry 0-1.		P Morey 0-9, G McInerney 1-1, S Heaslip 1-0, M Nugent 0-1.

12 October 1980	Antrim	2-12 - 1-9	Kerry	Fr. Healy Park, Loughguile
	M O'Connell 1-1, T Kearns 1-0, P Boyle 0-4, J Crossey 0-3, B Donnelly 0-1, B Lavery 0-1, F Ward 0-1, T Barton 0-1.		J Regan 1-1, J Bunyan 0-4, S Flaherty 0-2, J Fitzgerald 0-1, W Allen 0-1.	Referee: B Crawford (Down)

9 November 1980	Kilkenny	2-10 - 3-12	Laois	Nowlan Park, Kilkenny
	D O'Hara 1-2, J Brennan 1-1, M Nash 0-2, N Brennan 0-1, B Fitzpatrick 0-1.		S Plunkett 1-1, B Bohane 0-4, M Cuddy 1-0, M Cuddy 1-0, M Brophy 0-3, P Dowling 0-2, M Walsh 0-1, C Dunphy 0-1.	Referee: M Kelleher (Kildare)

9 November 1980	Kerry	1-7 - 4-13	Dublin	Ardfert
	J Kelly 1-0, F Bowler 0-2, J O'Grady 0-2, M Bunyan 0-1, S Flaherty 0-1, T Nolan 0-1.		M Holden 2-2, G Hayes 0-5, D Murphy 1-1, D Kavanagh 1-0, P Mulhaire 0-2, D McGrath 0-2, J Morris 0-1.	Referee: N Duggan (Limerick)

9 November 1980	Antrim	1-7 - 3-9	Clare	Casement Park, Belfast
	B Laverty 1-0, P Boyle 0-2, R McDonnell 0-2, B Donnelly 0-2, S Boyle 0-1.		S Heaslip 2-0, E O'Connor 1-0, T Keane 0-2, Seán Hehir 0-2, M Nugent 0-1, G McInerney 0-1, P Morey 0-1, P O'Connor 0-1, J Callinan 0-1.	Referee: B Crawford (Down)

16 November 1980	Dublin	1-8 - 2-11	Kilkenny	Croke Park, Dublin
	G Hayes 0-7, L Walsh 1-0, M Johnstone 0-1.		B Fitzpatrick 1-5, M Kennedy 1-0, J Brennan 0-2, T Moran 0-1, G Henderson 0-1, C Heffernan 0-1, M Nash 0-1.	Referee: G Kirwan (Offaly)

23 November 1980	Antrim	1-8 - 1-10	Westmeath	Fr. Healy Park, Loughguile
	P Boyle 0-4, B Donnell 1-0, R McDonnell 0-3, B Laverty 0-1.		M Ryan 1-2, M Kilcoyne 0-3, P Dalton 0-3, W Shanley 0-1, M Cosgrove 0-1.	Referee: S McGrattan (Down)

23 November 1980	Dublin	2-7 - 0-19	Clare	Croke Park, Dublin
	G Hayes 0-5, P Holden 1-1, P Mulhaire 1-0, L Browne 0-1.		P Morey 0-6, S Stack 0-4, J Callinan 0-3, T Nugent 0-2, E O'Connor 0-1, J Heaslip 0-1, S Hehir 0-1, G Loughnane 0-1.	Referee: D Robinson (Kildare)

23 November 1980	Laois	1-15 - 4-3	Kerry	Rathdowney
	B Bohane 0-8, P Critchley 1-0, M Brophy 0-3, M Walsh 0-2, J Mahon 0-2.		T Nolan 1-1, J Bunyan 1-1, P Moriarty 1-1, M O'Sullivan 1-0.	Referee: S O'Grady (Limerick)

7 December 1980	Kerry	0-11 - 0-11	Kilkenny	Austin Stack Park, Tralee
	J Bunyan 0-7, T Nolan 0-4.		B Fitzpatrick 0-6, M Nash 0-2, N Brennan 0-2, M Kennedy 0-1.	Referee: P Burns (Limerick)

7 December 1980	Westmeath	0-8 - 1-5	Dublin	Castletown Geoghegan
	W Shanley 0-2, P Dalton 0-2, M Kilcoyne 0-2, M Ryan 0-1, D Kilcoyne 0-1.		J Cunningham 1-0, G Hayes 0-2, D Kavanagh 0-1, M Holden 0-1, L Browne 0-1.	Referee: M Kelleher (Laois)

7 December 1980	Laois	2-7 - 3-14	Clare	O'Moore Park, Portlaoise
	B Bohane 0-4, S Plunkett 1-0, P Dowling 1-0, M Brophy 0-2, Mick Cuddy 0-1.		E O'Connor 2-1, J Callinan 0-4, S Heaslip 1-0, S Hehir 0-3, S Stack 0-2, P Morey 0-2, L Quinlan 0-1, P O'Connor 0-1.	Referee: N Matthews (Wexford)

8 February 1981	Kilkenny	2-11 - 2-9	Clare	Nowlan Park, Kilkenny
	B Fitzpatrick 0-7, C Heffernan 1-1, J Brennan 1-0, G Henderson 0-1, G Fennelly 0-1, M Ruth 0-1.		C Honan 0-5, E O'Connor 1-0, S Heaslip 1-0, S Hehir 0-2, J Callinan 0-1, S Stack 0-1.	Referee: J Denton (Wexford)

8 February 1981	Dublin	1-9 - 0-6	Antrim	Croke Park, Dublin
	J Cunningham 1-2, G hayes 0-5, P Costelloe 0-2.		P Boyle 0-3, D McNaughton 0-1, B Donnelly 0-1, G Cunningham 0-1.	Referee: M Kelleher (Kildare)

22 February 1981	Kerry	2-8 - 0-16	Clare	Ardfert
	J Bunyan 1-1, M O'Sullivan 1-0, T Nolan 0-3, C Nolan 0-1, F Bowler 0-1.		C Honan 0-6, J Callinan 0-4, G Loughnane 0-2, P O'Connor 0-1, E O'Connor 0-1, S Heaslip 0-1, S Stack 0-1.	Referee: N Duggan (Limerick)

22 February 1981	Antrim	1-3 - 1-10	Laois	Casement Park, Belfast
	D McNaughton 1-0, P Boyle 0-1, B Donnelly 0-1, B McGaughey 0-1.		P Critchley 1-0, B Bohane 0-3, M Brophy 0-3, M Walsh 0-3, Mick Cuddy 0-1.	Referee: S McGrattan (Down)

8 March 1981	Laois	2-11 - 0-7	Dublin	Kelly Daly Park, Rathdowney
	PJ Cuddy 2-0, B Bohane 0-5, M Walsh 0-2, T Flynn 0-1, M Brophy 0-1, Martin Cuddy 0-1, P Critchley 0-1.		G Hayes 0-3, T Naughton 0-1, D Moody 0-1, S Fleming 0-1, L Brown 0-1.	Referee: G Kirwan (Offaly)

8 March 1981	Kerry	0-6 - 1-6	Westmeath	Austin Stack Park, Tralee
	T Nolan 0-2, C Nolan 0-2, M o'Sullivan 0-1, J Bunyan 0-1.		M Ryan 1-0, JJ Lynch 0-2, D Kilcoyne 0-1, P Dalton 0-1, J Leonard 0-1, M Cosgrove 0-1.	Referee: J Nihill (Clare)

8 March 1981	Kilkenny	2-14 - 0-6	Antrim	Nowlan Park, Kilkenny
	G Fennelly 0-7, J Brennan 1-2, M Ruth 1-2, P Horan 0-2, J Hennessy 0-1.		J McClean 0-2, P Boyle 0-1, M Connell 0-1, E Donnelly 0-1, P McFall 0-1.	Referee: J Landers (Laois)

15 March 1981	Laois	3-9 - 0-7	Westmeath	Kelly Daly Park, Rathdowney
	T Flynn 2-1, P Critchley 1-2, W Bohane 0-4, Mick Cuddy 0-1, Martin Cuddy 0-1.		JJ Lynch 0-4, W Shanley 0-1, P Curran 0-1, M Cosgrove 0-1.	Referee: S Brennan (Galway)

=== Knock-out stage ===
Play-offs

22 March 1981 Play-off	Clare	2-13 – 1-10	Laois	MacDonagh Park, Nenagh
	S Heaslip 1-2, G Honan 0-4, E O'Connor 1-0, J Callinan 0-3, S Stack 0-2, P O'Connor 0-1, P Morey 0-1.		T Flynn 1-1, M Brophy 0-4, M Walsh 0-2, PJ Cuddy 0-2, P Critchley 0-1.	Referee: S O'Meara (Tipperary)

22 March 1981 Play-off	Wexford	2-13 – 1-12	Galway	Semple Stadium, Thurles
	N Buggy 1-6, T Doran 1-1, M Casey 0-4, S Kinsella 0-1, J Meyler 0-1.		F Gantley 0-4, B Lynskey 1-0, P Ryan 0-2, B Forde 0-2, PJ Molloy 0-2, N Lane 0-1, I Clarke 0-1.	Referee: G Ryan (Tipperary)

29 March 1981 Play-off	Waterford	4-13 – 3-10	Wexford	Nowlan Park, Kilkenny
	P McGrath 0-6, M Walsh 1-1, T Maher 1-1, P Curran 1-1, J Greene 1-0, T Casey 0-2, S Breen 0-1, P Daly 0-1.		N Buggy 2-2, S Kinsella 0-5, J FLeming 1-1, C Doran 0-1, M Casey 0-1.	Attendance: 6,000; Referee: G Ryan (Tipperary)

Quarter-finals

5 April 1981 Quarter-final	Laois	4-12 – 4-11	Tipperary	Nowlan Park, Kilkenny
	M Brophy 0-6, P Critchley 1-2, T Flynn 1-1, PJ Cuddy 1-1, M Walsh 1-1, Martin Cuddy 0-1.		P Fox 2-3, E O'Shea 1-1, G O'Brien 1-0, P McGrath 0-3, P Queally 0-3, J Grogan 0-1.	Referee: M Kelleher (Kildare)

12 April 1981 Quarter-final	Waterford	3-15 – 1-14	Clare	Semple Stadium, Thurles
	T Casey 1-6, J Greene 2-2, P McGrath 0-2, T Maher 0-2, P Curran 0-1, P Daly 0-1, P Ryan 0-1.		P Morey 0-5, M Nugent 1-0, J Callinan 0-3, E O'Connor 0-2, S Heaslip 0-1, P O'Connor 0-1, G Loughnane 0-1, A Nugent 0-1.	Attendance: 5,000; Referee: F Murphy (Cork)

Semi-finals

19 April 1981 Semi-final	Offaly	2-13 – 4-6	Laois	Nowlan Park, Kilkenny
	P Horan 1-5, P Kirwan 1-2, P Carroll 0-2, P Delaney 0-1, J Kelly 0-1, L Currams 0-1, B Bermingham 0-1.		M Brophy 1-5, C Jones 2-0, PJ Cuddy 1-0, P Bohane 0-1.	Referee: N O'Donoghue (Dublin)

19 April 1981 Semi-final	Cork	1-19 – 2-10	Waterford	Semple Stadium, Thurles
	P Horgan 0-6, É O'Donoghue 1-2, J Murphy 0-3, J Fenton 0-2, P Crowley 0-2, J Barry-Murphy 0-1, D Mulcahy 0-1, T Crowley 0-1, P Moylan 0-1.		T Casey 1-4, J Greene 1-1, S Breen 0-1, B Daly 0-1, M Whelan 0-1, T Maher 0-1, N Connors 0-1.	Attendance: 10,000; Referee: J O'Grady (Limerick)

Final

3 May 1981 Final	Cork	3-11 – 2-8	Offaly	Semple Stadium, Thurles
	J Barry-Murphy 2-1, T Crowley 1-0, P Crowley 0-4, É O'Donoghue 0-2, J Horgan 0-2, S O'Leary 0-1, D Mac Curtain 0-1.		P Horan 1-2, M Corrigan 1-1, P Delaney 0-2, B Bermingham 0-1, D Owens 0-1, P Carroll 0-1.	Attendance: 20,000; Referee: J Denton (Wexford)

== League statistics ==
=== Top scorers ===
Top scorers overall

Rank	Player	Team	Tally	Total	Matches	Average
1	Ned Buggy	Wexford	5-26	41	6	6.83
2	Séamus Bourke	Tipperary	7-19	40	7	5.71
3	Éamonn Cregan	Limerick	6-17	35	5	7.00
4	Tom Casey	Waterford	3-25	34	6	5.66
5	Pádraig Horan	Offaly	4-21	33	8	4.12

Top scorers in a single game

Rank	Player	Team	Tally	Total	Opposition
1	Séamus Bourke	Tipperary	3-04	13	Galway
2	Tom Casey	Waterford	1-09	12	Limerick
3	Éamonn Cregan	Limerick	2-05	11	Wexford
4	John Stone	Tipperary	3-01	10	Waterford
4	Ned Buggy	Wexford	1-07	10	Tipperary
6	Joe McKenna	Limerick	2-03	9	Offaly
6	Pat Fox	Tipperary	2-03	9	Laois
6	Séamus Bourke	Tipperary	2-03	9	Wexford
6	Ned Buggy	Wexford	1-06	9	Galway
6	Tom Casey	Waterford	1-06	9	Clare
6	Pat Morey	Clare	0-09	9	Westmeath

=== Miscellaneous ===
- Waterford qualified for the semi-final stage of the league for the first time since the 1962-63 league.

== Division 2 ==
=== Table ===
Pos	Team	Pld	W	D	L	Pts	Notes
1	Carlow	6	5	0	1	10	Division 2 champions
2	Down	6	4	0	2	8	
3	Kildare	6	4	0	2	8	
4	Roscommon	6	3	0	3	6	
5	Wicklow	6	2	0	4	4	
6	Meath	6	2	0	4	4	
7	Armagh	6	2	0	4	4	
