= 1978 All-Ireland Under-21 Hurling Championship =

All-Ireland Under-21 Hurling Championship 1978
Championship Details
- Dates: 19 April – 29 October 1978

All Ireland Champions
- Winners: Galway (2nd win)
- Captain: Bernie Forde

All Ireland Runners-up
- Runners-up: Tipperary
- Captain: Pat Fitzelle

Provincial Champions
- Munster: Tipperary
- Leinster: Offaly
- Ulster: Antrim
- Connacht: Galway

Championship Statistics
- Top Scorer: Séamus Bourke (8-21)

The 1978 All-Ireland Under-21 Hurling Championship was the 15th staging of the All-Ireland Under-21 Hurling Championship since its establishment by the Gaelic Athletic Association in 1964. The championship ran from 19 April to 29 October 1978.

Kilkenny were the defending champions, however, they were beaten by Laois in the Leinster semi-finals.

The All-Ireland final, a replay, was played on 29 October 1978 at the Gaelic Grounds in Limerick, between Galway and Tipperary, in what was their fifth championship meeting overall and their first meeting in the final in 11 years. Galway won the match by 3–15 to 2–08 to claim their second championship title overall and a first championship title in six years.

Tipperary's Séamus Bourke was the championship's top scorer with 8-21.

== Leinster Under-21 Hurling Championship ==
=== Leinster quarter-finals ===
21 May 1978 Quarter-final	Laois	0-10 - 1-06	Dublin	Kelly Daly Park
	C Wall 0-7, N Foynes 0-2, J Curran 0-1.		H Norton 1-0, D Kavanagh 0-3, D McGrath 0-1, D Gaffney 0-1, B Murphy 0-1.

21 May 1978 Quarter-final	Offaly	4-17 - 1-06	Carlow	St Brendan's Park
	M Cashin 1-4, M Corrigan 1-3, L Spain 1-1, P Kirwan 1-1, N Bergin 0-3, T Conneely 0-3, J Mooney 0-1, A Fogarty 0-1.		J Kavanagh 1-4, P Nolan 0-1, P Hickey 0-1.

=== Leinster semi-finals ===
14 June 1978 Semi-final	Laois	1-07 - 0-08	Kilkenny	O'Moore Park
	C Wall 0-5, C Dunphy 1-1, E Hearns 0-1.		E Crowley 0-2, J Power 0-2, C Hennessy 0-1, C Heffernan 0-1, R Power 0-1, J Ryan 0-1.

1 July 1978 Semi-final	Offaly	5-09 - 1-10	Wexford	St Brendan's Park
	P Kirwan 3-2, T Conneely 1-5, N Bergin 1-0, N Corrigan 0-1, W Molloy 0-1.		P Harpur 1-0, G O'Connor 0-3, B O'Connor 0-3, M Shannon 0-1, J Wafer 0-1, J Houlihan 0-1, J Barron 0-1.

=== Leinster final ===
26 July 1978 Final	Offaly	2-14 - 2-07	Laois	Dr Cullen Park
	M Cashin 1-1, B Keeshin 0-3, T Conneely 0-3, N Bergin 0-2, D Owens 0-2, A Fogarty 0-1, W Molloy 0-1, M Corrigan 0-1.		C Wall 2-2, C Dunphy 0-3, J Lalor 0-2.	Referee: P Johnston (Kilkenny)

== Munster Under-21 Hurling Championship ==
=== Munster first round ===
19 April 1978 First round	Waterford	2-06 - 1-06	Clare	Seán Treacy Park
	P Fanning 1-2, P Kirwan 1-0, D Fitzpatrick 0-3, J O'Regan 0-1.		N Duggan 1-0, M Maher 0-3, L Quinlan 0-2, M Nugent 0-1.

26 April 1978 First round	Cork	1-08 - 0-07	Limerick	Páirc Uí Chaoimh
	J O'Sullivan 1-1, P Horgan 0-3, P Crowley 0-2, D O'Herlihy 0-1, C Ryan 0-1.		G Collins 0-2, T Dunne 0-2, G Mulcahy 0-1, J Mann 0-1.	Referee: N Dalton (Waterford)

=== Munster semi-finals ===
12 July 1978 Semi-final	Waterford	1-06 - 3-15	Tipperary	Walsh Park
	D Fitzpatrick 0-4, J Cotter 1-0, K Brophy 0-1, C Curley 0-1.		S Bourke 1-9, T Grogan 1-2, E O'Shea 1-0, P Ryan 0-2, J Hannigan 0-2.	Referee: F Murphy (Cork)

20 July 1978 Semi-final	Cork	5-18 - 1-02	Kerry	Fr Con Buckley Park
	P Crowley 1-7, D Buckley 2-0, C Ryan 1-1, T Lyons 1-1, J Cremin 0-4, J Buckley 0-3, P Horgan 0-1, D Herlihy 0-1.		J O'Sullivan 1-0, S Flaherty 0-1, W Allen 0-1.

=== Munster final ===
10 August 1978 Final	Tipperary	3-13 - 4-10	Cork	Semple Stadium
	P Fitzelle 0-7, T Grogan 2-0, E O'Shea 1-2, S Burke 0-3, M Doyle 0-1.		T Cashman 2-0, D Buckley 1-3, J O'Sullivan 0-5, T Lyons 1-1, P Horgan 0-1.	Referee: N Dalton (Waterford)

=== Munster final replay ===
20 August 1978 Final replay	Cork	2-09 - 3-08	Tipperary	Páirc Uí Chaoimh
	D Buckley 1-2, T Lyons 1-1, C Ryan 0-3, P Crowley 0-1, J Cremin 0-1, P Horgan 0-1.		S Burke 1-2, T Walsh 1-1, E O'Shea 1-0, P Fitzelle 0-3, J O'Dwyer 0-1, M Doyle 0-1.	Referee: N Dalton (Waterford)

== Ulster Under-21 Hurling Championship ==
=== Ulster final ===
2 September 1978 Final	Antrim	5-18 - 3-08	Down	Casement Park
	P McFall 1-7, S McNaughton 2-0, P McIlhatton 1-2, F Heatley 0-5, S McNaughton 1-1, F McKernan 0-1, J McKernan 0-1, A McKernan 0-1.		B Mullen 1-1, D Sheehan 1-0, S Rice 1-0, B Coulter 0-2, T Browne 0-2, E Sheehan 0-1, P Ritchie 0-1, B Savage 0-1.

== All-Ireland Under-21 Hurling Championship ==
=== All-Ireland semi-finals ===
10 September 1978 Semi-final	Antrim	1-08 - 3-09	Tipperary	Casement Park
	S McNaughton 1-3, P McFall 0-3, D Donnelly 0-1, Sean McNaughton 0-1.		S Burke 3-1, T Walsh 0-3, T Ryan 0-1, P Ryan 0-1, G Stapleton 0-1, P Fitzelle 0-1, P Loughnane 0-1.	Referee: N O'Donoghue (Dublin)

10 September 1978 Semi-final	Offaly	2-09 - 2-13	Galway	St Brendan's Park
	P Kirwan 2-4, B Keeshan 0-2, M Cashin 0-1, D Owens 0-1, T Conneely 0-1.		B Forde 1-3, M Conneely 1-1, G Kennedy 0-4, P Ryan 0-2, J Goode 0-1, S Mahon 0-1, M Kilkenny 0-1.	Referee: G Ryan (Tipperary)

=== All-Ireland final ===
8 October 1978 Final	Galway	3-05 - 2-08	Tipperary	Gaelic Grounds
	M Conneely 2-2, J Ryan 1-2, M Kilkenny 0-1.		S Burke 2-2, P Ryan 0-1, J Grace 0-1, T Walsh 0-1, E O'Shea 0-1, T Grogan 0-1, K Fox 0-1.	Attendance: 18,000; Referee: N O'Donoghue (Tipperary)

=== All-Ireland final replay ===
29 October 1978 Final replay	Galway	3-15 - 2-08	Tipperary	Gaelic Grounds
	G Kennedy 0-8, M Conneely 2-0, J Ryan 0-4, B Forde 1-0, P Ryan 0-2, M Kilkenny 0-1.		S Burke 1-4, T Ryan 1-0, E O'Shea 0-3, T Grogan 0-1.	Referee: N O'Donoghue (Tipperary)

== Championship statistics ==
=== Top scorers ===
Rank	Player	Club	Tally	Total	Matches	Average
1	Séamus Bourke	Tipperary	8-21	45	6	7.50
2	Paddy Kirwan	Offaly	7-07	28	4	7.00
3	Conleth Wall	Laois	2-14	20	3	6.66
4	Matty Conneely	Galway	5-03	18	3	6.00
5	Danny Buckley	Cork	4-05	17	4	4.25

=== Miscellaneous ===
- Offaly won the Leinster U21HC title for the first time in their history.
