= Donie O'Connell =

Irish hurler

Personal information
- Native name: Dónall Ó Conaill (Irish)
- Born: 1960 (age 65–66) Killenaule, County Tipperary, Ireland
- Occupation: Technician
- Height: 6 ft 0 in (183 cm)

Sport
- Sport: Hurling
- Position: Centre-forward
Club
- Years: Club
- Killenaule
Club titles
- Tipperary titles: 0
Inter-county
- Years: County
- 1981-1991: Tipperary
Inter-county titles
- Munster titles: 4
- All-Irelands: 2
- NHL: 1
- All Stars: 0

Donie O'Connell (born 24 June 1960) is an Irish retired hurler. His league and championship career with the Tipperary senior team lasted ten seasons from 1981 to 1991.

O'Connell first appeared for the Killenaule club at juvenile and underage levels, before eventually joining the club's adult team with whom he won three South Tipperary championship medals.

O'Connell made his debut on the inter-county scene when he was selected for the Tipperary minor team as a dual player. He enjoyed two unsuccessful championship seasons in this grade. O'Connell subsequently joined the under-21 hurling team, winning back-to-back All-Ireland medals in 1980 and 1981. He later joined the Tipperary senior team, making his debut during the 1981-82 league. Over the course of the following ten seasons he enjoyed much success, culminating with the winning of All-Ireland medals in 1989 and 1991. O'Connell also won four Munster medals and one National League medal. He played his last game for Tipperary in September 1991.

After being chosen on the Munster inter-provincial team for the first time in 1985, O'Connell was an automatic choice on the starting fifteen for the following four years. During that time he won one Railway Cup medal.

== Honours ==
Munster

- Railway Cup (1): 1985

Tipperary

- All-Ireland Senior Hurling Championship (2): 1989 (c), 1991
- Munster Senior Hurling Championship (4): 1987, 1988, 1989, 1991
- National Hurling League (1): 1987-88
- All-Ireland Under-21 Hurling Championship (2): 1980, 1981
- Munster Under-21 Hurling Championship (2): 1980, 1981
