= 1988 All-Ireland Under-21 Hurling Championship final =

1988 All-Ireland Under-21 Hurling Championship Final
- Event: 1988 All-Ireland Under-21 Hurling Championship
Cork	Kilkenny
4-11	1-5
- Date: 11 September 1988
- Venue: St. Brendan's Park, Birr
- Referee: John Moore (Waterford)

The 1988 All-Ireland Under-21 Hurling Championship final was a hurling match that was played at Walsh Park, Waterford on 11 September 1988 to determine the winners of the 1988 All-Ireland Under-21 Hurling Championship, the 25th season of the All-Ireland Under-21 Hurling Championship, a tournament organised by the Gaelic Athletic Association for the champion teams of the four provinces of Ireland. The final was contested by Cork of Munster and Kilkenny of Leinster, with Cork winning by 4-11 to 1-5.

The All-Ireland final between Cork and Kilkenny was the fifth championship meeting between the two teams. Cork were hoping to win their first title since 1982, while Kilkenny were hoping to claim their first title since 1984.

A John Fitzgibbon goal for Cork after just 16 seconds set the tone for what would be a complete rout. Mark Foley and Dan O'Connell added two more goals to give Cork a comfortable 3-7 to 0-2 half-time lead. O'Connell added his second and Cork's fourth goal ten minutes into the second half. John Feehan pegged one back for Kilkenny midway through the half, however, the cause was lost.

Cork's All-Ireland victory was their first in six years. The win gave them ninth All-Ireland title overall.

Kilkenny's All-Ireland defeat was their sixth ever. It was their third defeat by Cork in an All-Ireland final.

== Match ==
=== Details ===
11 September 1988

Kilkenny	4-11 – 1-5	Cork
D O'Connell 2-1, M Foley 1-1, G Manley 0-4, J Fitzgibbon 1-0, F Horgan 0-3, J Corcoran 0-1, T Cooney 0-1.		J Feehan 1-0, T O'Keeffe 0-2, P Hoban 0-1, T Murphy 0-1, L Egan 0-1.

St. Brendan's Park, Birr
Referee: J Moore (Waterford)
