= 1981 Railway Cup Hurling Championship =

Irish hurling competition

- Dates: 1 March 1981 - 17 March 1981
- Teams: 4
- Champions: Munster (35th title); Joe McKenna (captain)
- Runners-up: Leinster

Tournament statistics
- Matches played: 3
- Goals scored: 10 (3.33 per match)
- Points scored: 60 (20 per match)
- Top scorer(s): Éamonn Cregan (2-09)

The 1981 Railway Cup Hurling Championship was the 55th staging of the Railway Cup since its establishment by the Gaelic Athletic Association in 1927. The cup began on 1 March 1981 and ended on 17 March 1981.

Connacht were the defending champions, however, they were beaten by Leinster in the semi-final.

On 17 March 1981, Munster won the cup after a 2–16 to 2–06 defeat of Leinster in the final at Cusack Park. This was their 35th Railway Cup title overall and their first title since 1978.

== Results ==
=== Semi-finals ===
| 1 March 1981 Semi-final | Leinster | 0-11 - 0-06 | Connacht | St. Brendan's Park, Birr |
| | P Delaney 0-3, P Quirke 0-2, P Carroll 0-2, M Walsh 0-2, P Horan 0-1, M Corrigan 0-1. | | Joe Connolly 0-4, S Linnane 0-1, F Gantley 0-1. | Referee: W Horgan (Cork) |

| 1 March 1981 Semi-final | Munster | 5-13 - 1-08 | Ulster | St. Conleth's Park, Newbridge |
| | P Horgan 2-1, E Cregan 1-3, J McKenna 1-2, J Fenton 0-4, J Callinan 1-0, E O'Donoghue 0-2, M Walsh 0-1. | | S Boyle 1-2, E Sheehan 0-3, B Gilmore 0-1, C O'Flynn 0-1, B Donnelly 0-1. | Referee: D Robinson (Kildare) |

=== Final ===
| 17 March 1981 Final | Munster | 2-16 - 2-06 | Leinster | Cusack Park, Ennis |
| | E Cregan 1-6, J McKenna 1-2, J Callinan 0-4, J Fenton 0-3, P Horgan 0-1. | | P Delaney 1-2, M Corrigan 1-0, P Horan 0-3, J Kelly 0-1. | Referee: S Brennan (Galway) |

== Scoring statistics ==
Top scorers overall

| Rank | Player | Club | Tally | Total | Matches | Average |
|---|---|---|---|---|---|---|
| 1 | Éamonn Cregan | Munster | 2-09 | 15 | 2 | 7.50 |
| 2 | Joe McKenna | Munster | 2-04 | 10 | 2 | 5.00 |
| 3 | Pat Horgan | Leinster | 2-02 | 8 | 2 | 4.00 |
| 3 | Pat Delaney | Leinster | 1-05 | 8 | 2 | 4.00 |

J McKenna 10 P Delaney 8 P Horgan 8

== Bibliography ==
- Donegan, Des, The Complete Handbook of Gaelic Games (DBA Publications Limited, 2005).
