= Martin McGrath =

'Martin McGrath may refer to:

== Sport ==
- Martin McGrath (footballer, born 1960), English footballer
- Martin McGrath (Gaelic footballer), Irish Gaelic footballer
- Martin McGrath (hurler) (born 1962), Irish hurler
- Marty McGrath (born 1984), former Australian rules football player

== Other people ==
- Martin McGrath (cinematographer), Australian cinematographer of the long-running series Rake, among others
