= Philip Kennedy =

Philip Kennedy may refer to:

- Philip Kennedy (hurler) (born 1960), Irish hurler
- Philip Kennedy (footballer), Scottish footballer
