= 1979–80 National Hurling League =

49th season of the National Hurling League

League details
- Dates: 4 November 1979 – 26 October 1980

League champions
- Winners: Cork (11th win)
- Captain: Dermot Mac Curtain
- Manager: Len Gaynor

League runners-up
- Runners-up: Limerick
- Captain: Seán Foley
- Manager: Noel Drumgoole

Other division winners
- Division 2: Wicklow
- Division 3: Mayo

The 1979–80 National Hurling League was the 49th season of the National Hurling League (NHL), an annual hurling competition for the GAA county teams. It was won by Cork.

== Overview ==
=== Division 1 ===
The National Hurling League's top division featured fourteen teams divided into two equal groups - 1A and 1B. Each group consisted of seven teams. The top two teams from Division 1A automatically qualified for the knock-out semi-finals. The third and fourth placed teams, as well as the top two teams from Division 1B, contested two lone quarter-finals. In spite of losing two group games and finishing second in Division 1A, Cork won the league title following a 4-15 to 4-6 defeat of Limerick in a replay of the final.

Down at the other end of the tables, Kilkenny and Clare won just two of their group stage games and were both relegated to Division 1B. They swapped places with Wexford and Waterford who finished in first and second positions respectively in Division 1B. Kildare finished the group stage without a single win and were relegated to Division 2.

== Division 1 ==
National Hurling League Division 1
- Season: 1979-80
- Champions: Cork; 11th National League title Captain: Dermot Mac Curtain; Manager: Bertie Troy
- Relegated: Kildare
- Matches: 49
- Top goalscorer: Joe McKenna
- Biggest home win: Limerick 6-8 - 0-5 Galway (18 November 1979)
- Biggest away win: Kildare 1-10 - 4-9 Wexford (10 February 1980)
- Highest scoring: Cork 4-15 - 4-6 Limerick (18 May 1980)
- All statistics correct as of 10 February 2017.

Tipperary came into the season as defending champions of the 1978-79 season. Kerry entered Division 1 as the promoted team.

On 10 May 1980, Cork won the title after a 4-15 to 4-6 win over Limerick in the final. It was their 11th league title overall and their first since 1973-74.

Kildare were relegated from Division 1 after losing all of their group stage games.

=== Division 1A table ===
| Pos | Team | Pld | W | D | L | Pts | Notes |
|---|---|---|---|---|---|---|---|
| 1 | Tipperary | 6 | 4 | 2 | 0 | 10 | |
| 2 | Cork | 6 | 4 | 0 | 2 | 8 | Division 1 champions |
| 3 | Galway | 6 | 3 | 0 | 3 | 6 | |
| 4 | Offaly | 6 | 2 | 1 | 3 | 5 | |
| 5 | Limerick | 6 | 2 | 1 | 3 | 5 | Division 1 runners-up |
| 6 | Kilkenny | 6 | 2 | 0 | 4 | 4 | Relegated to Division 1B |
| 7 | Clare | 6 | 2 | 0 | 4 | 4 | Relegated to Division 1B |

=== Group stage ===
| 4 November 1979 | Galway | 0-9 - 0-7 | Kilkenny | Pearse Stadium, Galway |
| | F Gantley 0-3, Joe Connolly 0-2, J Goode 0-2, John Connolly 0-1, B Forde 0-1. | | L O'Brien 0-2, M Crotty 0-2, N Brennan 0-1, R Deleny 0-1, C Heffernan 0-1. | Referee: J Woods (Clare) |

| 4 November 1979 | Offaly | 1-7 - 0-10 | Tipperary | St. Brendan's Park, Birr |
| | P Kirwan 0-4, J Kelly 1-0, M Corrigan 0-2, E Coughlan 0-1. | | S Burke 0-6, S Moloughney 0-2, S Power 0-1, S Ryan 0-1. | Referee: J Rankins (Laois) |

| 4 November 1979 | Cork | 3-15 - 3-7 | Clare | Páirc Uí Chaoimh, Cork |
| | S O'Leary 2-1, C McCarthy 1-3, R Cummins 0-3, J Fenton 0-2, T Cashman 0-2, P Moylan 0-2, D Coughlan 0-1, E O'Donoghue 0-1. | | T Ryan 1-1, E O'Connor 1-0, N Casey 1-0, J Callinan 0-2, P O'Connor 0-2, G Loughnane 0-1, S Hehir 0-1. |

| 18 November 1979 | Tipperary | 1-10 - 1-6 | Cork | Semple Stadium, Thurles |
| | E O'Shea 1-1, S Bourke 0-3, S Ryan 0-2, B Kenny 0-2, P Queally 0-1, P Looby 0-1. | | J Horgan 0-4, C McCarthy 1-0, J Fenton 0-1, P Moylan 0-1. | Referee: N Duggan (Limerick) |

| 18 November 1979 | Limerick | 6-8 - 0-5 | Galway | Gaelic Grounds, Limerick |
| | J McKenna 3-0, W Fitzmaurice 2-1, T Dunne 1-1, G Mulcahy 0-3, O O'Connor 0-1, E Grimes 0-1, P Fitzmaurice 0-1. | | I Clarke 0-3, P Ryan 0-1, F Gantley 0-1. |

| 18 November 1979 | Kilkenny | 3-4 - 2-9 | Offaly | Nowlan Park, Kilkenny |
| | T Malone 1-0, L O'Brien 1-0, K Fennelly 1-0, M Kennedy 0-2, G Fennelly 0-2. | | P Horan 2-0, P Kirwan 0-5, J Kelly 0-2, P Carroll 0-1, D Devery 0-1. |

| 2 December 1979 | Cork | 1-5 - 0-4 | Kilkenny | Páirc Uí Chaoimh, Cork |
| | E O'Donoghue 1-1, P Moylan 0-2, D Buckley 0-1, J Barry-Murphy 0-1. | | G Fennelly 0-2, K Fennelly 0-2. | Referee: N Dalton (Waterford) |

| 2 December 1979 | Clare | 1-8 - 1-9 | Tipperary | Dr. Daly Park, Tulla |
| | E O'Connor 1-2, M Meehan 0-2, N Casey 0-1, G Loughnane 0-1, J Callinan 0-1, C Honan 0-1. | | S Bourke 0-8, J Williams 1-0, S Ryan 0-1. | Referee: S O'Connor (Limerick) |

| 2 December 1979 | Offaly | 2-7 - 0-10 | Limerick | St. Brendan's Park, Birr |
| | J Kelly 1-1, E Coughlan 1-0, P Kirwan 0-3, M Corrigan 0-2, B Keeshan 0-1. | | G Mulcahy 0-6, W Fitzmaurice 0-2, P Kelly 0-1, B Carroll 0-1. | Referee: N O'Donoghue (Dublin) |

| 16 December 1979 | Tipperary | 2-9 - 0-13 | Galway | Semple Stadium, Thurles |
| | S Bourke 1-5, P Fitzelle 0-1, E O'Shea 0-1, J Grogan 0-1, P Queally 0-1. | | Joe Connolly 0-7, C Hayes 1-0 (og), N Lane 0-2, I Clarke 0-2, S Mahon 0-1, P Ryan 0-1. | Referee: F Murphy (Cork) |

| 16 December 1979 | Kilkenny | 3-16 - 1-12 | Limerick | Nowlan Park, Kilkenny |
| | C Heffernan 2-2, G Fennelly 0-5, L Fennelly 1-1, B Fitzpatrick 0-2, M Crotty 0-2, M Kennedy 0-2, R Delaney 0-1, K Fennelly 0-1. | | W Fitzmaurice 1-2, J McKenna 0-2, B Carroll 0-2, G Mulcahy 0-2, O O'Connor 0-1, J Carroll 0-1, M Carroll 0-1, E Meshill 0-1. | Referee: JJ Landers (Laois) |

| 16 December 1979 | Clare | 1-11 - 2-7 | Offaly | Dr. Daly Park, Tulla |
| | C Honan 0-6, E O'Connor 1-0, T Ryan 0-2, S Hehir 0-1, P O'Connor 0-1, N Casey 0-1. | | P Kirwan 0-5, J Flaherty 1-0, B Birmingham 1-0, P Horan 0-1, P Carroll 0-1. |

| 10 February 1980 | Limerick | 0-11 - 0-10 | Cork | Gaelic Grounds, Limerick |
| | E Cregan 0-3, O O'Connor 0-2, P Kelly 0-2, J McKenna 0-1, W Fitzmaurice 0-1, G Mulcahy 0-1, B Carroll 0-1. | | C Ryan 0-2, J Horgan 0-2, E O'Donoghue 0-2, J Fenton 0-1, P Moylan 0-1, T Cashman 0-1. |

| 10 February 1980 | Galway | 2-6 - 1-6 | Offaly | Pearse Stadium, Galway |
| | G Curtin 2-0, PJ Molloy 0-4, J Goode 0-1, N Lane 0-1. | | J Flaherty 1-1, P Horan 0-2, B Keeshan 0-2, M Corrigan 0-1. | Referee: G Ryan (Tipperary) |

| 10 February 1980 | Kilkenny | 3-9 - 1-12 | Clare | Nowlan Park, Kilkenny |
| | C Heffernan 2-1, B Fitzpatrick 1-4, M Kennedy 0-1, J Hennessy 0-1, G Fennelly 0-1, M Crotty 0-1. | | E O'Connor 1-1, J Callinan 0-4, C Horan 0-4, N Ryan 0-1, N Casey 0-1, P O'Connor 0-1. | Referee: J Denton (Wexford) |

| 24 February 1980 | Tipperary | 3-10 - 1-8 | Kilkenny | Semple Stadium, Thurles |
| | N O'Dwyer 1-3, J Williams 1-1, T Butler 1-0, S Bourke 0-3, P Queally 0-2, E O'Shea 0-1. | | L Fennelly 1-0, L O'Brien 0-4, G Fennelly 0-2, M Crotty 0-1, C Heffernan 0-1. | Referee: JJ Landers (Waterford) |

| 24 February 1980 | Cork | 1-12 - 0-5 | Galway | Páirc Uí Chaoimh, Cork |
| | R Cummins 1-1, C McCarthy 0-2, J Barry-Murphy 0-2, P Horgan 0-2, J Horgan 0-2, T Crowley 0-1, T Cashman 0-1, D Mac Curtain 0-1. | | Joe Connolly 0-3, S Mahon 0-1, M Kilkenny 0-1. | Referee: S O'GRady (Limerick) |

| 24 February 1980 | Clare | 1-11 - 1-7 | Limerick | Dr. Daly Park, Tulla |
| | | | C Honan 1-5, E O'Connor 0-2. | Referee: G Ryan (Tipperary) |

| 9 March 1980 | Galway | 1-15 - 1-9 | Clare | Ballinasloe Sportsfield, Ballinasloe |
| | F Gantley 1-2, PJ Molloy 0-3, N Lane 0-3, S Linnane 0-2, G Curtin 0-2, S Silke 0-1, M Kilkenny 0-1, Joe Connolly 0-1. | | C Honan 0-4, N Ryan 1-0, T Ryan 0-1, M Meehan 0-1, E O'Connor 0-1, J Callinan 0-1, N Casey 0-1. | Referee: N O'Donoghue (Dublin) |

| 9 March 1980 | Limerick | 0-11 - 2-5 | Tipperary | Gaelic Grounds, Limerick |
| | E Cregan 0-6, J McKenna 0-4, G Mulcahy 0-1. | | J Williams 1-0, P Queally 1-0, S Bourke 0-5. | Referee: S Brennan (Galway) |

| 9 March 1980 | Offaly | 1-10 - 2-9 | Cork | O'Connor Park, Tullamore |
| | P Horan 1-1, J Flaherty 0-4, P Delaney 0-2, M Corrigan 0-2, T Conneely 0-1. | | J Barry-Murphy 1-2, E O'Donoghue 1-1, C McCarthy 0-2, T Cashman 0-1, D Buckley 0-1, P Horgan 0-1, R Cummins 0-1. | Referee: G Ryan (Tipperary) |

=== Division 1B table ===
| Pos | Team | Pld | W | D | L | Pts | Notes |
|---|---|---|---|---|---|---|---|
| 1 | Wexford | 6 | 5 | 1 | 0 | 11 | Promoted to Division 1A |
| 2 | Waterford | 6 | 4 | 1 | 1 | 9 | Promoted to Division 1A |
| 3 | Laois | 6 | 4 | 0 | 2 | 8 | |
| 4 | Dublin | 5 | 3 | 0 | 2 | 6 | |
| 5 | Antrim | 6 | 2 | 0 | 4 | 4 | |
| 6 | Kerry | 6 | 1 | 0 | 5 | 2 | |
| 7 | Kildare | 5 | 0 | 0 | 5 | 0 | Relegated to Division 2 |

=== Group stage ===
| 4 November 1979 | Antrim | 4-10 - 3-6 | Kildare | Corrigan Park, Belfast |
| | D Donnelly 1-3, S McNaughton 1-2, M O'Connell 1-1, B Donnelly 1-1, P Boyle 0-3. | | P White 2-0, M Moore 1-0, J Walshe 0-3, J O'Connell 0-3. | Referee: S McGrattan (Down) |

| 4 November 1979 | Waterford | 0-10 - 1-12 | Laois | Fraher Field, Dungarvan |
| | M Walsh 0-5, T Maher 0-4, R Walsh 0-1. | | J Mahon 1-3, J Kirwan 0-3, C Jones 0-3, F Keenan 0-2, K Dollard 0-1. | Referee: J Devlin (Wexford) |

| 4 November 1979 | Kerry | 0-2 - 2-7 | Wexford | Ardfert |
| | M O'Sullivan 0-1, S Flaherty 0-1. | | S Kinsella 1-2, J Fleming 1-0, M Casey 0-2, James O'Connor 0-2, T Doran 0-1. | Referee: P Byrne (Limerick) |

| 18 November 1979 | Dublin | 1-11 - 1-7 | Antrim | Croke Park, Dublin |
| | J Cunningham 1-5, V Holden 0-2, F Spellman 0-1, P Carton 0-1, G Hayes 0-1, D Murphy 0-1. | | J Crossey 1-1, M O'Connell 0-4, S McNaughton 0-2. | Referee: T Murtagh (Meath) |

| 18 November 1979 | Laois | 4-5 - 2-4 | Kerry | Kelly Daly Park, Rathdowney |
| | F Keenan 3-3, M Cuddy 1-0, J Kirwan 0-2. | | T Nolan 1-1, M O'Sullivan 1-0, DJ Leahy 0-2, J Kelly 0-1. |

| 18 November 1979 | Kildare | 2-7 - 0-15 | Waterford | Naas |
| | M Moore 1-1, G Tiernan 1-0, F Deering 0-2, J Walshe 0-2, C Walsh 0-1, J O'Connell 0-1. | | D Fitzpatrick 0-7, M Walsh 0-3, T Casey 0-2, T Maher 0-1, M Ormonde 0-1, P Kelly 0-1. |

| 2 December 1979 | Waterford | 2-11 - 0-7 | Dublin | Fraher Field, Dungarvan |
| | D Fitzpatrick 0-6, M Ormonde 1-1, I Gorman 1-0, T Casey 0-1, M Walsh 0-1, T Maher 0-1, N Connors 0-1. | | J Cunningham 0-3, G Hayes 0-1, M Hurley 0-1, J Morris 0-1, F Spellman 0-1. |

| 2 December 1979 | Wexford | 2-7 - 2-4 | Laois | Wexford Park, Wexford |

| 16 December 1979 | Wexford | 1-8 - 2-5 | Waterford | O'Kennedy Park, New Ross |
| | N Buggy 1-2, T Doran 0-3, M Jacob 0-1, M Quigley 0-1, M Casey 0-1. | | T Maher 1-2, M Ormonde 1-0, T Casey 0-2, D Fitzpatrick 0-1. | Referee: G Ryan (Tipperary) |

| 16 December 1979 | Laois | 2-15 - 0-7 | Antrim | Kelly Daly Park, Rathdowney |
| | P Keenan 1-5, Mick Cuddy 1-0, M Brophy 0-3, J Kirwan 0-3, Martin Cuddy 0-2, I Bohane 0-1, M Walsh 0-1. | | M O'Connell 0-3, P O'Boyle 0-1, T Donnelly 0-1, B Lavery 0-1, L McKillop 0-1. | Referee: T Furlong (Dublin) |

| 27 January 1980 | Kerry | 1-6 - 1-5 | Kildare | Ardfert |
| | T Nolan 1-4, J Kelly 0-1, J O'Sullivan 0-1. | | T White 1-0, T Carew 0-2, J Walshe 0-2, N Walsh 0-1. |

| 10 February 1980 | Kildare | 1-10 - 4-9 | Wexford | Geraldine Park, Athy |
| | J Walshe 0-10, M Moore 1-0. | | PJ Harris 2-0, S Kinsella 1-1, M Quigley 1-0, J Fleming 0-2, N Buggy 0-2, G O'Connor 0-1, T Doran 0-1, P Courtney 0-1. | Referee: P Moylan (Offaly) |

| 10 February 1980 | Dublin | 0-20 - 0-5 | Kerry | Croke Park, Dublin |
| | G Hayes 0-4, M Holden 0-3, B Donovan 0-2, L Browne 0-2, F Spellman 0-1, J Morris 0-1, V Holden 0-1. | | T Nolan 0-3, J McElligott 0-1, J O'Sullivan 0-1. | Referee: G Kirwan (Offaly) |

| 10 February 1980 | Antrim | 0-2 - 0-9 | Waterford | Corrigan Park, Belfast |

| 24 February 1980 | Wexford | 4-11 - 2-11 | Dublin | Páirc Uí Shíocháin, Gorey |
| | T Doran 3-1, PJ Harris 1-2, S Kinsella 0-5, J Fleming 0-2, M Casey 0-1. | | B Donovan 1-1, J Morris 1-0, G Hayes 0-3, J Cunningham 0-2, M Holden 0-2, V Holden 0-1, P Carton 0-1, B Barry 0-1. | Referee: G Kirwan (Offaly) |

| 24 February 1980 | Laois | 3-12 - 2-7 | Kildare | O'Keeffe Park, Borris-in-Ossory |
| | F Keenan 0-5, M Cuddy 1-1, J Kirwan 1-1, J Mahon 1-0, M Brophy 0-4, M Walsh 0-1. | | T Carew 1-5, M Moore 1-0, L Shinners 0-1, J Downes 0-1. | Referee: G Hennessy (Kilkenny) |

| 24 February 1980 | Antrim | 0-9 - 1-3 | Kerry | Ardfert |
| | B Donnelly 0-3, E Donnelly 0-3, P Boyle 0-2, M O'Connell 0-1. | | J Kirby 1-0, J O'Sullivan 0-1, J O'Grady 0-1, PJ Houlihan 0-1. | Referee: N Duggan (Limerick) |

| 9 March 1980 | Dublin | 1-13 - 0-11 | Laois | Croke Park, Dublin |
| | F Spellman 1-3, B Barry 0-3, V Holden 0-2, M Holden 0-2, P Carron 0-2, L Browne 0-1. | | F Keenan 0-5, M Brophy 0-2, M Walsh 0-2, Mick Cuddy 0-1, J Kirwan 0-1. | Referee: J Denton (Wexford) |

| 9 March 1980 | Antrim | 1-9 - 1-13 | Wexford | Fr. Healy Park, Loughguile |
| | B Lavery 1-2, E Donnelly 0-4, F Ward 0-1, M O'Connell 0-1, P Boyle 0-1. | | PJ Harris 1-2, S Kinsella 0-5, J Fleming 0-2, M Quigley 0-2, M Jacob 0-1, M Casey 0-1. | Referee: B Crawford (Down) |

| 9 March 1980 | Waterford | 0-16 - 1-7 | Kerry | Fraher Field, Dungarvan |
| | M Walsh 0-4, D Fitzpatrick 0-4, T Maher 0-2, D Mac Shamhrain 0-2, P Curran 0-2, T Moore 0-1, J Greene 0-1. | | J Kirby 1-0, J O'Sullivan 0-3, T Nolan 0-2, L Hussey 0-1, DJ Leahy 0-1. |

=== Play-off ===
| 30 March 1980 Play-off | Offaly | 0-10 - 2-6 | Limerick | Semple Stadium, Thurles |
| | J Flaherty 0-5, P Kirwan 0-2, M Corrigan 0-1, P Horan 0-1, P Delaney 0-1. | | E Cregan 1-4, J McKenna 1-0, E Grimes 0-1, O O'Connor 0-1. | Attendance: 2,000; Referee: N Dalton (Waterford) |

=== Knock-out stage ===
Quarter-finals

| 6 April 1980 Quarter-final | Galway | 1-12 - 1-12 | Waterford | Semple Stadium, Thurles |
| | Joe Connolly 0-6, John Connolly 1-0, S Linnane 0-2, B Forde 0-1, F Gantley 0-1, G Curtin 0-1, S Mahon 0-1. | | D Fitzpatrick 0-7, M Ormonde 1-1, J Greene 0-2, M Walsh 0-1, P Curran 0-1. | Attendance: 4,000; Referee: J Rankins (Laois) |

| 13 April 1980 Quarter-final | Wexford | 1-13 - 3-10 | Limerick | Nowlan Park, Kilkenny |
| | S Kinsella 0-5, PJ Harris 1-1, M Casey 0-3, G O'Connor 0-2, C Doran 0-1, P Courtney 0-1. | | O O'Connor 1-5, E Cregan 2-0, J McKenna 0-4, S Foley 0-1. | Referee: J Moloney (Tipperary) |

| 13 April 1980 Quarter-final replay | Galway | 3-15 - 2-7 | Waterford | Croke Park, Dublin |
| | B Forde 2-0, Joe Connolly 0-5, S Silke 1-1, G Curtin 0-2, P Ryan 0-2, John Connolly 0-2, PJ Molloy 0-1, N Lane 0-1, M Kilkenny 0-1. | | J Greene 2-0, D Fitzpatrick 0-6, T Casey 0-1. | Attendance: J Rankins (Laois); Referee: 11,410 |

Semi-finals

| 20 April 1980 Semi-final | Cork | 1-12 - 0-12 | Galway | Gaelic Grounds, Limerick |
| | R Cummins 1-0, P Horgan 0-3, T Cashman 0-3, S O'Leary 0-2, J Horgan 0-1, T Crowley 0-1, D Buckley 0-1, E O'Donoghue 0-1. | | Joe Connolly 0-6, B Forde 0-2, P Ryan 0-1, John Connolly 0-1, I Clarke 0-1, J Ryan 0-1. | Attendance: 23,563; Referee: J Woods (Clare) |

| 20 April 1980 Semi-final | Tipperary | 1-11 - 2-13 | Limerick | Gaelic Grounds, Limerick |
| | S Burke 0-6, E O'Shea 1-1, G Stapleton 0-3, D Carey 0-1. | | J McKenna 1-4, E Grimes 1-2, E Cregan 0-2, L O'Donoghue 0-1, J Flanagan 0-1, J Carroll 0-1, B Carroll 0-1, S Foley 0-1. | Attendance: 23,563; Referee: J Rankins (Laois) |

Finals

| 4 May 1980 Final | Cork | 2-10 - 2-10 | Limerick | Páirc Uí Chaoimh, Cork |
| | E O'Donoghue 1-2, R Cummins 1-1, P Horgan 0-4, D Buckley 0-1, S O'Leary 0-1, J Barry-Murphy 0-1. | | J McKenna 1-2, O O'Connor 1-1, E Cregan 0-3, J Flanagan 0-2, E Grimes 0-1, B Carroll 0-1. | Attendance: 32,855; Referee: N O'Donoghue (Dublin) |

| 18 May 1980 Final replay | Cork | 4-15 - 4-6 | Limerick | Páirc Uí Chaoimh, Cork |
| | R Cummins 2-2, J Fenton 1-4, E O'Donoghue 1-1, P Horgan 0-4, S O'Leary 0-1, P Moylan 0-1, T Crowley 0-1, J Barry-Murphy 0-1. | | E Cregan 2-2, J McKenna 2-1, M Carroll 0-1, P Fitzmaurice 0-1, B Carroll 0-1. | Attendance: 34,543; Referee: N O'Donoghue (Dublin) |

== Division 2 ==
=== Knock-out stage ===
| 13 April 1980 Final | Wicklow | 2-14 - 1-5 | Armagh | Aughrim County Ground |

== Division 3 ==
=== Knock-out stage ===
| 27 July 1980 Semi-final | Louth | 5-5 - 1-18 | Mayo | Páirc Seán Mac Diarmada |
| | | | | Referee: M Keane |

| 12 October 1980 Semi-final | Derry | 1-1 - 2-10 | Monaghan | Fr. Peter Campbell Park |
| | | | | Referee: P Hartnett |

| 26 October 1980 Final | Mayo | 2-13 - 0-7 | Monaghan | Páirc Seán Mac Diarmada |
