= 1982 Railway Cup Hurling Championship =

Irish hurling competition

- Dates: 14 February 1982 - 17 March 1982
- Teams: 4
- Champions: Connacht (3rd title)
- Runners-up: Leinster

Tournament statistics
- Matches played: 3
- Goals scored: 13 (4.33 per match)
- Points scored: 58 (19.33 per match)
- Top scorer(s): P. J. Molloy (3-09)

The 1982 Railway Cup Hurling Championship was the 56th staging of the Railway Cup since its establishment by the Gaelic Athletic Association in 1927. The cup began on 14 February 1982 and ended on 17 March 1982.

Munster were the defending champions, however, they were beaten by Connacht in the semi-final.

On 17 March 1982, Connacht won the cup after a 3-08 to 2-09 defeat of Leinster in the final at O'Connor Park. This was their third Railway Cup title overall and their first title since 1980.

== Results ==
=== Semi-finals ===
14 February 1982 Semi-final	Connacht	1-13 - 2-08	Munster	Pearse Stadium, Galway
	PJ Molloy 1-7, B Lynskey 0-2, N Lane 0-1, B Forde 0-1, J Henry 0-1, S Linnane 0-1.		J McKenna 1-2, J Greene 1-2, T Cashman 0-1, P McGrath 0-1, J Callinan 0-1, T Crowley 0-1.	Referee: N O'Donoghue (Dublin)

14 February 1982 Semi-final	Ulster	2-05 - 3-15	Leinster	Casement Park, Belfast
	B Donnelly 1-1, J McLean 1-0, S Collins 0-1, E Sheehan 0-1, D Donnelly 0-1, E Donnelly 0-1.		M Brophy 0-6, P Delaney 1-2, P Carroll 1-1, PJ Cuddy 1-1, M Corrigan 0-3, M Walsh 0-1, B Fitzpatrick 0-1.	Referee: B Crawford (Down)

=== Final ===
17 March 1982 Final	Leinster	2-09 - 3-08	Connacht	O'Connor Park, Tullamore
	B Fitzpatrick 1-2, PJ Cuddy 1-1, M Brophy 0-4, P Delaney 0-1, J Hennessy 0-1.		PJ Molloy 2-2, M Connolly 1-1, J Henry 0-3, S Linnane 0-1, B Lynskey 0-1.	Referee: N Dalton (Waterford)

== Scoring statistics ==
Top scorers overall

Rank	Player	Club	Tally	Total	Matches	Average
1	P. J. Molloy	Connacht	3-09	18	2	9.00
2	Martin Brophy	Leinster	0-10	10	2	5.00
3	P. J. Cuddy	Leinster	2-02	8	2	4.00

== Bibliography ==
- Donegan, Des, The Complete Handbook of Gaelic Games (DBA Publications Limited, 2005).
