= Pat Fitzelle =

Irish hurler

Personal information
- Nickname: Pa
- Born: 1957 (age 68–69) Cashel, County Tipperary, Ireland

Sport
- Sport: Hurling
- Position: Centre-back
Club
- Years: Club
- Cashel King Cormacs
Club titles
- Tipperary titles: 1
- Munster titles: 1
Inter-county*
| Years | County | Apps (scores) |
| 1976-1987 | Tipperary | 13 (0-07) |
Inter-county titles
- Munster titles: 1
- All-Irelands: 0
- NHL: 1
- All Stars: 0
- *Inter County team apps and scores correct as of 14:15, 27 August 2021.

Patrick J. Fitzelle (born 1957) is an Irish former hurler. At club level he played with Cashel King Cormacs and was also a member of the Tipperary senior hurling team. He usually lined out as a half-back or at midfield.

== Career ==
Fitzelle first played at juvenile and underage levels with the Cashel King Cormacs club before joining the club's senior team. He won numerous West Tipperary Championship titles across three decades, before winning a Munster Club Championship title in 1991. Fitzelle first appeared on the inter-county scene during a two-year stint with the Tipperary minor team. He progressed onto the Tipperary under-21 team and lined out in the 1978 All-Ireland final defeat by Galway. By this stage Fitzelle had already been drafted onto the Tipperary senior hurling team. He spent more than a decade with the team and won a Munster Championship title in 1987.

== Honours ==
Cashel King Cormacs

- Munster Senior Club Hurling Championship: 1991
- Tipperary Senior Hurling Championship: 1991
- West Tipperary Senior Hurling Championship: 1975, 1976, 1980, 1988, 1990, 1991

Tipperary

- Munster Senior Hurling Championship: 1987
- National Hurling League: 1978-79
- Munster Under-21 Hurling Championship: 1978
