= 1984 All-Ireland Under-21 Hurling Championship final =

1984 All-Ireland Under-21 Hurling Championship Final
- Event: 1984 All-Ireland Under-21 Hurling Championship
Kilkenny	Tipperary
1-12	0-11
- Date: 26 August 1984
- Venue: Walsh Park, Waterford

The 1984 All-Ireland Under-21 Hurling Championship final was a hurling match that was played at Walsh Park, Waterford on 26 August 1984 to determine the winners of the 1984 All-Ireland Under-21 Hurling Championship, the 20th season of the All-Ireland Under-21 Hurling Championship, a tournament organised by the Gaelic Athletic Association for the champion teams of the four provinces of Ireland. The final was contested by Kilkenny of Leinster and Tipperary of Munster, with Kilkenny winning by 1-12 to 0-11.

The All-Ireland final between Kilkenny and Tipperary was the third championship meeting between the two teams. Kilkenny were appearing in their third final since last winning the title in 1977, while Tipperary were appearing in their sixth final in seven years.

Kilkenny's All-Ireland victory was their first since 1977. The win gave them fourth third All-Ireland title overall and put them in outright third position on the all time roll of honour.

Tipperary's All-Ireland defeat was their fourth ever and their second in succession. It was also their first championship defeat by Kilkenny in this grade.

== Match ==
=== Details ===
26 August 1984

Kilkenny	1-12 – 0-11	Tipperary
B Heffernan 1-4, L McCarthy 0-4, P Ryan 0-1, M Rafter 0-1, D Carroll 0-1, P Walsh 0-1.		M Scully 0-5, J Hayes 0-2, D Fogarty 0-2, A Waters 0-1, D Kealy 0-1.

Walsh Park, Waterford
Referee: L Walsh (Limerick)
