= Martin McGrath (hurler) =

Irish hurler (born 1962)

Personal information
- Native name: Máirtín Mac Craith (Irish)
- Born: 2 March 1962 (age 64) Dundrum, County Tipperary, Ireland
- Height: 5 ft (152 cm)9

Sport
- Sport: Hurling
- Position: Centre-forward
Club
- Years: Club
- Knockavilla–Donaskeigh Kickhams
Club titles
- Golden, Dundrum, titles: 0
Inter-county*
Years	County	Apps (scores)
1982-1987	Tipperary	3 (1-5)
Inter-county titles
- Munster titles: 1
- All-Irelands: 0
- NHL: 0
- All Stars: 0
- *Inter County team apps and scores correct as of 21:06, 4 September 2014.

Martin McGrath (born 1962) is an Irish retired hurler who played as a centre-forward for the Tipperary senior team.

Born in Dundrum, County Tipperary, McGrath first arrived on the inter-county scene at the age of seventeen when he first linked up with the Tipperary minor team before later joining the under-21 side. He made his senior debut during the 1982 championship. McGrath went on to enjoy a brief career and won one Munster medal.

At club level McGrath won numerous divisional championship medals as a hurler and a Gaelic footballer with Knockavilla–Donaskeigh Kickhams.

Throughout his career McGrath made 3 championship appearances for Tipperary. His retirement came following the conclusion of the 1987 championship.

== Honours ==
=== Player ===
Tipperary

- Munster Senior Hurling Championship (1): 1987
- All-Ireland Minor Hurling Championship (1): 1980
- Munster Minor Hurling Championship (1): 1980
- All-Ireland Under-21 Hurling Championship (1): 1981
- Munster Under-21 Hurling Championship (1): 1981
