= 1978 Railway Cup Hurling Championship =

Irish hurling competition

- Dates: 16 April 1978 - 7 May 1978
- Teams: 4
- Champions: Munster (33rd title)
- Runners-up: Leinster

Tournament statistics
- Matches played: 3
- Goals scored: 8 (2.67 per match)
- Points scored: 85 (28.33 per match)

The 1978 Railway Cup Hurling Championship was the 52nd staging of the Railway Cup since its establishment by the Gaelic Athletic Association in 1927. The cup began on 16 April 1978 and ended on 7 May 1978.

Leinster were the defending champions.

On 7 May 1978, Munster won the cup following a 2-13 to 1-11 defeat of Leinster in the final. This was their 33rd Railway Cup title overall and their first title since 1976.

== Results ==
Semi-finals

16 April 1978 Semi-final	Munster	0-20 - 1-11	Connacht	Páirc Uí Chaoimh, Cork
	J McKenna 0-4, C McCarthy 0-4, J Callinan 0-3, C Honan 0-2, M Whelan 0-2, J Horgan 0-2, T Butler 0-1, G McCarthy 0-1, E McCarthy 0-1.		F Gantley 1-6, PJ Molloy 0-2, F Burke 0-1, G Holland 0-1, J Connolly 0-1.

23 April 1978 Semi-final	Ulster	1-13 - 3-17	Leinster	Corrigan Park, Belfast
	R McDonnell 1-2, J Crossey 0-3, P Boyle 0-2, J O'Neill 0-2, S Collins 0-1, J Hughes 0-1, A Hammill 0-1, D McNaughton 0-1.		N Buggy 0-7, B Fitzpatrick 1-3, T Doran 1-0, M Ruth 1-0, M Walsh 0-4, P Carroll 0-2, C Kehoe 0-1.

Final

7 May 1978 Final	Munster	2-13 - 1-11	Leinster	Páirc Uí Chaoimh, Cork
	J Horgan 0-4, N Casey 1-0, J McKenna 1-0, C Honan 0-3, T Butler 0-3, T Cashman 0-2, G McCarthy 0-1.		N Buggy 0-8, T Doran 1-0, M Quigley 0-1, M Ruth 0-1, F Cummins 0-1.	Referee: G Ryan (Tipperary)

== Scoring statistics ==
Top scorers overall

Rank	Player	Club	Tally	Total	Matches	Average
1	Ned Buggy	Leinster	0-15	15	2	7.50
2	Finbarr Gantley	Connacht	1-06	9	1	9.00
3	Joe McKenna	Munster	1-04	7	2	3.50

== Bibliography ==
- Donegan, Des, The Complete Handbook of Gaelic Games (DBA Publications Limited, 2005).
