= Michael Scully (hurler) =

Irish hurler

Personal information
- Native name: Mícheál Ó Scolaí (Irish)
- Born: 1964 (age 61–62) Roscrea, County Tipperary, Ireland

Sport
- Sport: Hurling
- Position: Left corner-forward
Club
- Years: Club
- Roscrea
Club titles
- Tipperary titles: 0
Inter-county
- Years: County
- 1985-1987: Tipperary
Inter-county titles
- Munster titles: 0
- All-Irelands: 0
- NHL: 0
- All Stars: 0

Michael Scully (born 1964) is an Irish retired hurler who played as a left wing-forward for the Tipperary senior team.

An All-Ireland-winning captain in the under-21 grade, Scully made his first appearance for the senior team during the 1985-86 National League and became a regular member of the team over the next few seasons. During that time he failed to claim any honours at senior level.

At club level Scully played with the Roscrea club.

Achievements
Preceded by Séamus Delahunty (Kilkenny)	All-Ireland Under-21 Hurling Final winning captain 1985	Succeeded by Anthony Cunningham (Galway)
