= Diarmaid FitzGerald =

Irish sportsman

Diarmaid Fitzgerald
Personal information
- Native name: Diarmaid Mac Gearailt (Irish)
- Born: 18 February 1983 (age 43)

Sport
- Sport: Hurling
Club
- Years: Club
- Roscrea
Inter-county titles
- All Stars: none

Diarmaid Fitzgerald (born 18 February 1983) is an Irish sportsman. He is a former member of the Tipperary senior hurling team.

Dr. Diarmaid Fitzgerald was born in Roscrea, County Tipperary in 1983. He was educated in Roscrea and went on to study physiotherapy from which he became a phD graduate from University College Dublin. With UCD, FitzGerald has won a Freshers All-Ireland in 2002 and a Walsh Cup medal in 2004. He also has two Dublin Senior Hurling medals, won in 2004 and 2005. FitzGerald plays club hurling with his native Roscrea where he has won two North Tipperary Minor Hurling medals in 1999 and 2000, and a North Tipperary Senior medal in 2004. He captained the Tipperary minor hurlers to munster final glory in 2001 against a highly fancied Cork side on a blistering hot day in Pairc Ui Chaoimh. He then also captained the same bunch of players to more success in 2004 under 21 munster hurling championship. FitzGerald made his competitive debut at wing-back for Tipperary against Offaly in the 2004 National Hurling League. He made his championship debut against Waterford in 2004. Diarmaid won the RTE man of the match in Tipperary's extra time replay victory over Limerick in May 2005.

== See also ==
- Tipperary Player Profiles
