= 1976 All-Ireland Under-21 Hurling Championship final =

1976 All-Ireland Under-21 Hurling Championship Final
- Event: 1976 All-Ireland Under-21 Hurling Championship
Cork	Kilkenny
2-17	1-8
- Date: 19 September 1976
- Venue: Walsh Park, Waterford
- Referee: Gerry Kirwan (Offaly)

The 1976 All-Ireland Under-21 Hurling Championship final was a hurling match that was played at Walsh Park, Waterford on 19 September 1976 to determine the winners of the 1976 All-Ireland Under-21 Hurling Championship, the 13th season of the All-Ireland Under-21 Hurling Championship, a tournament organised by the Gaelic Athletic Association for the champion teams of the four provinces of Ireland. The final was contested by Cork of Munster and Kilkenny of Leinster, with Cork winning by 2-17 to 1-8.

The All-Ireland final between Cork and Kilkenny was their third championship meeting. Cork, appearing in their 8th final, were hoping to win their 7th title in 11 years. Kilkenny, the reigning champions of the previous two years, were hoping to win their third All-Ireland title over all.

Cork's All-Ireland victory was their second in four years. The victory secured their position as number one on the all-time roll of honour.

== Match ==
=== Details ===
19 September 1976

Cork	2-17 – 1-8	Kilkenny
P Horgan 1-5, T Murphy 0-6, K Murphy 1-1, D Buckley 0-2, J Fenton 0-1, R McDonnell 0-1, C Brassil 0-1.		J Lyng 0-6, B Fennelly 1-0, J Hennessy 0-1, K Brennan 0-1.

Walsh Park, Waterford
Referee: G Kirwan (Offaly)
