= 1979 All-Ireland Under-21 Hurling Championship final =

1979 All-Ireland Under-21 Hurling Championship Final
- Event: 1979 All-Ireland Under-21 Hurling Championship
Tipperary	Galway
2-12	1-9
- Date: 23 September 1979
- Venue: O'Moore Park, Portlaoise
- Referee: Noel Dalton (Waterford)

The 1979 All-Ireland Under-21 Hurling Championship final was a hurling match that was played at O'Moore Park, Portlaoise on 23 September 1979 to determine the winners of the 1979 All-Ireland Under-21 Hurling Championship, the 16th season of the All-Ireland Under-21 Hurling Championship, a tournament organised by the Gaelic Athletic Association for the champion teams of the four provinces of Ireland. The final was contested by Tipperary of Munster and Galway of Connacht, with Tipperary winning by 2-12 to 1-9.

The All-Ireland final between Tipperary and Galway was their sixth championship meeting. Both sides were hoping to win their third All-Ireland title, while Galway were hoping to retain the title for the first time in their history.

== Match ==
=== Details ===
23 September 1979

Tipperary	2-12 – 1-9	Galway
M Doyle 1-2, P Looby 1-1, T Grogan 0-3, M Murphy 0-2, E O'Shea 0-2, A Slattery 0-1, B Mannion 0-1.		J Ryan 1-2, J Coen 0-4, P Ryan 0-1, S Davoren 0-1, C Hayes 0-1.

O'Moore Park, Portlaoise
Referee: N Dalton (Waterford)
