= 1977 All-Ireland Under-21 Hurling Championship final =

1977 All-Ireland Under-21 Hurling Championship Final
- Event: 1977 All-Ireland Under-21 Hurling Championship
Kilkenny	Cork
2-9	1-9
- Date: 9 October 1977
- Venue: Semple Stadium, Thurles
- Referee: Jimmy Rankin (Laois)

The 1977 All-Ireland Under-21 Hurling Championship final was a hurling match that was played at Semple Stadium, Thurles on 9 October 1977 to determine the winners of the 1977 All-Ireland Under-21 Hurling Championship, the 14th season of the All-Ireland Under-21 Hurling Championship, a tournament organised by the Gaelic Athletic Association for the champion teams of the four provinces of Ireland. The final was contested by Cork of Munster and Kilkenny of Leinster, with Kilkenny winning by 2-9 to 1-9.

The All-Ireland final between Cork and Kilkenny was their fourth championship meeting. Cork, appearing in their 9th final, were the reigning champions and were hoping to win their 8th title in 12 years. Kilkenny were appearing in their fourth successive final.

Kilkenny's All-Ireland victory was their third in four years. The victory installed them as second on the all-time roll of honour.

== Match ==
=== Details ===
12 October 1975

Kilkenny	2-9 – 1-9	Cork
B Fennelly 1-2, B Waldron 0-5, R Power 1-0, K Brennan 0-1, P Lennon 0-1.		T Lyons 1-1, T Murphy 0-3, T Cashman 0-2, R McDonnell 0-1, P Horgan 0-1, J Crowley 0-1.

Semple Stadium, Thurles
Attendance: 10,0-15
Referee: J Rankins (Laois)
