= 1978 All-Ireland Under-21 Hurling Championship final =

- Event: 1978 All-Ireland Under-21 Hurling Championship
| Galway | Tipperary |
| Galway | Tipperary |
| 3-5 | 2-8 |
- Date: 8 October 1978
- Venue: Gaelic Grounds, Limerick
- Referee: Noel O'Donoghue (Dublin)

Replay
| Galway | Tipperary |
| 3-15 | 2-8 |
- Date: 29 October 1978
- Venue: Gaelic Grounds, Limerick
- Referee: Noel O'Donoghue (Dublin)

The 1978 All-Ireland Under-21 Hurling Championship final was a hurling match played at the Gaelic Grounds, Limerick on 8 October 1978 to determine the winners of the 1978 All-Ireland Under-21 Hurling Championship, the 15th season of the All-Ireland Under-21 Hurling Championship, a tournament organised by the Gaelic Athletic Association for the champion teams of the four provinces of Ireland. The final was contested by Galway of Connacht and Tipperary of Munster, with the game ending in a 3–5 to 2–8 draw. The replay took place on 29 October 1978, with Galway winning by 3–15 to 2–8.

== Details ==
=== Drawn match ===
8 October 1978

| Galway | 3-5 – 2-8 | Tipperary |
|---|---|---|
| M Connolly 2-2, J Ryan 1-2, M Kilkenny 0-1. | | S Burke 2-2, T Grogan 0-1, K Fox 0-1, T Walsh 0-1, E O'Shea 0-1, P Ryan 0-1, J Grace 0-1. |

Gaelic Grounds, Limerick
Referee: N O'Donoghue (Dublin)

=== Replay ===
29 October 1978

| Galway | 3-15 – 2-8 | Tipperary |

Gaelic Grounds, Limerick
Referee: N O'Donoghue (Dublin)
