= Philip Kennedy (hurler) =

Irish hurler

Personal information
- Native name: Pilib Ó Cinnéide (Irish)
- Born: 1960 (age 65–66) Nenagh, County Tipperary, Ireland

Sport
- Sport: Hurling
- Position: Midfield
Club
- Years: Club
- Nenagh Éire Óg
Club titles
- Tipperary titles: 1
Inter-county*
Years	County	Apps (scores)
1981-1987	Tipperary	6 (0-2)
Inter-county titles
- Munster titles: 0
- All-Irelands: 0
- NHL: 0
- All Stars: 0
- *Inter County team apps and scores correct as of 13:17, 27 August 2012.

Philip Kennedy (born 1960) is an Irish retired hurler who played as a midfielder for the Tipperary senior team.

A two-time All-Ireland-winning captain in the under-21 grade, Kennedy made his first appearance for the senior team during the 1981-82 National League and became a regular member of the team over the next few seasons. During that time the inter-county team did not claim any honours at senior level.

At club level Kennedy was a one-time county club championship with the Nenagh Éire Óg club.

Achievements
Preceded by Michael Doyle	All-Ireland Under-21 Hurling Final winning captain 1980 - 1981	Succeeded by Martin McCarthy
