= 1980 Railway Cup Hurling Championship =

54th series of an annual hurling tournament

- Dates: 17 February - 17 March 1980
- Teams: Connacht; Leinster; Munster; Ulster
- Champions: Connacht (2nd title)
- Runners-up: Munster

Tournament statistics
- Matches played: 3
- Goals scored: 8 (2.67 per match)
- Points scored: 61 (20.33 per match)

The 1980 Railway Cup Hurling Championship was the 54th series of the Railway Cup, an annual hurling tournament organised by the Gaelic Athletic Association. The tournament took place between 17 February and 17 March 1980.

The championship was won by Connacht who secured the title following a 1-5 to 0-7 defeat of Munster in the final. This was their 2nd Railway Cup title, their first since 1947.

Leinster were the defending champions, however, they were defeated at the semi-final stage.

== Results ==
=== Semi-finals ===
17 February 1980
Semi-final

Connacht	1-13 - 1-10 (aet)	Leinster
J. Connolly 0-6; N. Lane 1-1; G. Curtin 0-2; M. Kilkenny 0-2; P. J. Molloy 0-1; J. Henry 0-1.		N. Buggy 0-4; P. Quirke 1-0; P. Kirwan 0-3; M. Walsh 0-2; B. Fitzpatrick 0-1

Dunlo Gaa Grounds
Referee: J. Woods (Clare)

17 February 1980
Semi-final

Munster	4-16 - 1-10	Ulster
M. Walsh 0-7; J. Callinan 1-2; R. Cummins 1-1; O. O'Connor 1-1; É. O'Donoghue 1-0; G. Loughnane 0-2; M. Carroll 0-1; T. Cashman 0-1; P. O'Connor 0-1		D. Donnelly 1-1; P. Boyle 0-3; S. Boyle 0-2; T. Donnelly 0-1; J. Hughes 0-1; C. O'Flynn 0-1; P. Devlin 0-1

Croke Park
Referee: C. Foley (Dublin)

=== Final ===
17 March 1980
Final

Connacht	1-5 - 0-7	Munster
S. Silke 1-0; J. Connolly 0-2; I. Clarke 0-1; S. Mahon 0-1; M. Kilkenny 0-1		J. Callinan 0-2; R. Cummins 0-1; G. Loughnane 0-1; T. Cashman 0-1; P. McGrath 0-1; M. Walsh 0-1

Croke Park
Referee: S. Denton (Wexford)

== Top scorers ==
Overall

Rank	Player	Team	Tally	Total	Matches	Average
1	John Connolly	Connacht	0-8	8	2	4.00
1	Mossy Walsh	Munster	0-8	8	2	4.00

Single game

Rank	Player	Club	Tally	Total	Opposition
1	Mossy Walsh	Munster	0-7	7	Ulster
2	John Connolly	Connacht	0-6	6	Leinster
3	John Callinan	Munster	1-2	5	Ulster
