= Munster Under-20 Hurling Championship =

Hurling competition

- Current season or competition: 2025 Munster Under-20 Hurling Championship
- Irish: Craobh Iománaíochta na Mumhan Fé-20
- Code: Hurling
- Founded: 1964; 62 years ago
- Region: Munster (GAA)
- Trophy: J. J. Kenneally Perpetual Memorial Cup
- No. of teams: 5
- Title holders: Clare (5th title)
- Most titles: Tipperary (23 titles)
- Sponsors: O'Neills.com
- TV partner: TG4

The Munster GAA Hurling Under-20 Championship, known simply as the Munster Under-20 Championship, is an annual inter-county hurling competition organised by the Munster Council of the Gaelic Athletic Association (GAA). It is the highest inter-county hurling competition for male players between the ages of 17 and 20 in the province of Munster. The championship was contested as the Munster Under-21 Championship between 1964 and 2018 before changing to an under-20 age category from 2019. It is sponsored by Bord Gáis Energy.

The final, currently held in May, serves as the culmination of a series of games played during a six-week period, and the results determine which team receives the J. J. Kenneally Perpetual Memorial Cup..

The Munster Championship is an integral part of the wider GAA Hurling Under-20 All-Ireland Championship. The winners of the Munster Championship, like their counterparts in the Leinster Championship, advance to the All-Ireland Under 20 Hurling Final.

Five teams currently participate in the Munster Championship. Tipperary are the most successful teams with 23 titles.

Seven teams have competed since the inception of the Munster Championship in 1964. The title has been won at least once by five teams, all of whom have won the title more than once. Tipperary are the current champions.

== History ==
=== Creation ===
The Munster Championship began in 1964 in response to a Congress motion put forward by the Kerry County Board for the introduction of a new championship grade. It was the fifth championship to be created after the senior, junior, minor and intermediate grades.

=== Beginnings ===
The inaugural Munster Championship featured Clare, Cork, Galway, Kerry, Limerick, Tipperary and Waterford. Galway and Kerry contested the very first match on Sunday 31 May 1964. Tipperary won the inaugural championship.

=== Team dominance ===
Since the beginning the championship has been dominated by Cork and Tipperary. They won all bar one of the available championship titles between 1964 and 1985 and have won a combined total of 39 championship titles. Cork also have the distinction of becoming the first team to win four championships in-a-row between 1968 and 1971. Tipperary equalled this record with their own four-in-a-row between 1978 and 1981 and, after defeat in 1982, came back to win a further three titles in succession between 1983 and 1985.

Waterford were the only team beside Cork and Tipperary to win the championship, with their lone title being claimed in 1974. Limerick broke the Cork-Tipperary dominance in 1986 and 1987 by claiming back-to-back championship titles. Waterford made the breakthrough by claiming championship wins in 1992 and 1994, however, the rest of the decade belonged to Cork and Tipperary once again.

The new century saw further breakthroughs as the Cork-Tipperary hegemony was broken up. Limerick have become the most successful team of the 21st century. After claiming three successive championship titles between 2000 and 2002, they won further titles in 2011, 2015 and 2017. After losing twelve Munster finals between 1972 and 2008, Clare finally claimed their first championship in 2009. They went on to claim three successive championships between 2012 and 2014. Waterford won their fourth championship after a 22-year gap in 2016.

=== Proposed changes ===
In 2008 a motion was brought before a special Congress in an effort to combat player burnout. It was proposed to merge the existing under-21 and minor championships to create a new Munster Under-19 Hurling Championship based on the provincial system. This motion was defeated by 115 votes to 58.

A similar motion was later introduced in an effort to lower the age and create a new Munster Under-20 Championship based on the provincial system, however, this motion was also defeated.

=== Age change ===
At the GAA Congress on 24 February 2018, the age limit of the championship was changed to twenty, following a successful motion by the Offaly County Board. In contrast to Gaelic football, under-20 hurlers are eligible to play both under-20 and senior hurling for their county.

== Current format ==
=== Championship ===
The Munster Championship is a knockout tournament with pairings drawn at random. Each match is played as a single leg. If a match is drawn there is a period of extra time, however, if the sides still remain level a replay is required.

There are five teams in the Munster Championship. An open draw is made in which three of the five teams automatically qualify for the semi-final stage of the competition. Two other teams play in a lone quarter-final with the winner joining the other three teams at the semi-final stage.

=== Qualification for the All-Ireland Championship ===
As of the 2018 championship qualification for the All-Ireland Championship has changed due to the introduction of a "back door" for defeated finalists. Both the champions and runners-up qualify for the All-Ireland semi-finals.

== Teams ==
=== 2022 championship ===
The following five teams will compete during the 2022 championship.

Team	Position in 2022	First year in championship	Years in championship in 2022	Championship titles	Last championship title
Clare	Quarter-finalists	1964	59	4	2014
Cork	Semi-finalists	1964	59	21	2021
Limerick	Winners	1964	59	9	2022
Tipperary	Runners-up	1964	59	21	2019
Waterford	Semi-finalists	1964	59	4	2016

=== Historic team changes ===
In spite of contesting the inaugural Munster Championship in 1964, Kerry had always been known as a county that was dominated by Gaelic football. Because of this the inter-county hurling team went into a sharp decline. Kerry's championship appearances were sporadic, while the team also suffered a number of heavy defeats before regrading to the All-Ireland Under-21 B Hurling Championship.

=== Non-Munster team ===
Due to a lack of meaningful competition in Connacht, Galway competed in the senior, intermediate and minor championships in Munster since 1959. Following the introduction of the under-21 grade, Galway played in the Munster Championship from 1964 until 1969. During that time they contested two finals.

== Venues ==
=== History ===
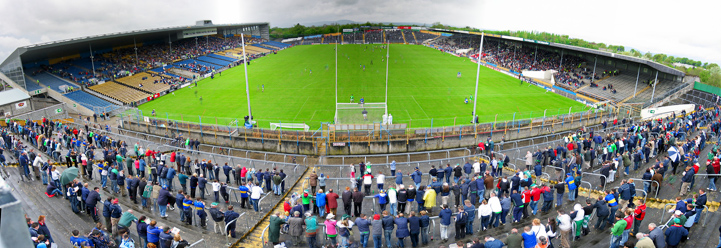
Semple Stadium in Thurles is the home venue of Tipperary. It has hosted more finals than any other stadium.

Munster Championship matches were traditionally played at neutral venues or at a location that was deemed to be halfway between the two participants; however, teams eventually came to home and away agreements depending on the capabilities of their stadiums. Cork and Tipperary, Limerick and Cork and Limerick and Tipperary were the first teams to develop home and away agreements whereby every second meeting between teams was played at the home venue of one of them. All of the current teams have home and away agreements.

=== Attendances ===
Stadium attendances are a significant source of regular income for the Munster Council and for the teams involved. For the 2017 championship, average attendances were 6,138 with a total aggregate attendance figure of 24,554.

=== Final ===
The venue for the final also comes under the terms of the individual home and away agreements between the teams involved. Semple Stadium in Thurles has hosted more finals than any other venue. In 1965 the final was held outside the province of Munster for the only time in the history of the championship when Tipperary defeated Galway in Ballinasloe, County Galway. The attendance at the 2018 Munster final was 6,732.

== Managers ==
Managers in the Munster Championship are involved in the day-to-day running of the team, including the training, team selection, and sourcing of players from the club championships. Their influence varies from county-to-county and is related to the individual county boards. The manager is assisted by a team of two or three selectors and an extensive backroom team consisting of various coaches. The under-20 team manager also works closely with the senior team manager due to an overlap of players on both teams. Prior to the development of the concept of a manager in the 1970s, teams were usually managed by a team of selectors with one member acting as chairman.

Winning managers (1981–present)
Manager	Team	Wins	Winning years
Mick Minogue	Tipperary	6	1981, 1983, 1984, 1985, 1989, 1990
Bertie Óg Murphy	Cork	3	1996, 1997, 1998
Dave Keane	Limerick	3	2000, 2001, 2002
Donal Moloney	Clare	3	2012, 2013, 2014
Gerry O'Connor	Clare	3	2012, 2013, 2014
Phil Bennis	Limerick	2	1986, 1987
Séamus Power	Tipperary	2	2003, 2004
Seán O'Gorman	Cork	2	2005, 2007
Pat Ryan	Cork	2	2020, 2021
Joe McGrath	Cork	1	1988
Denis Coughlan	Cork	1	1991
Peter Power	Waterford	1	1992
Seánie O'Leary	Cork	1	1993
Jim Greene	Waterford	1	1994
Michael Doyle	Tipperary	1	1995
Gerry O'Brien	Tipperary	1	1999
Tom Fogarty	Tipperary	1	2006
Declan Carr	Tipperary	1	2008
John Minogue	Clare	1	2009
Ken Hogan	Tipperary	1	2010
Leo O'Connor	Limerick	1	2011
John Kiely	Limerick	1	2015
Seán Power	Waterford	1	2016
Pat Donnelly	Limerick	1	2017
Denis Ring	Cork	1	2018
Liam Cahill	Tipperary	1	2019

Current managers
Nat.	Name	Team(s)	Appointed	Time as manager
	Seán Doyle	Clare	14 December 2018	7 years, 248 days
	Paul Beary	Limerick	11 January 2019	7 years, 220 days
	Stephen Gough	Waterford	17 February 2019	7 years, 183 days
	Pat Ryan	Cork	1 October 2019	6 years, 322 days
	John Devane	Tipperary	6 November 2019	6 years, 286 days

== Trophy and medals ==
The Corn na Cásca (Easter Cup) was first presented in 1966 to commemorate the golden jubilee of the 1916 Easter Rising. The cup was retired in 2018 when Shane Kingston of Cork was the last person to captain a team to the Munster Under-21 Championship title.

On 23 July 2019, a new cup for Munster Under-20 Championship was presented by the family of the late J. J. Kenneally by members of the Kenneally family to Munster GAA Chairman Liam Lenihan. Known as the J. J. Kenneally Perpetual Memorial Cup, the trophy commemorates the memory of one of Limerick city's most well-known jewellers and businessmen. The Kenneally family have supplied Munster GAA with medals and trophies for many years and they have donated this trophy in memory of J. J. Kenneally, a former president of the St. Patrick's club in Limerick.

At the end of the Munster final, the winning team is presented with the cup. The cup is held by the winning team until the following year's final. Traditionally, the presentation is made at a special rostrum in the stand where GAA and political dignitaries and special guests view the match.

The cup is decorated with ribbons in the colours of the winning team. During the game the cup actually has both teams' sets of ribbons attached and the runners-up ribbons are removed before the presentation. The winning captain accepts the cup on behalf of his team before giving a short speech. Individual members of the winning team then have an opportunity to come to the rostrum to lift the cup.

In accordance with GAA rules, the Munster Council awards up to twenty-four gold medals to the winners of the Munster final.

== Sponsorship ==
Since 2003, the Munster Championship has been sponsored. The sponsor has usually been able to determine the championship's sponsorship name.

Period	Sponsor(s)	Name
1964–2002	No main sponsor	The Munster Championship
2003–2007	(Republic of Ireland) Erin Foods	The Erin Munster Under-21 Hurling Championship
2008–2018	(Republic of Ireland) Bord Gáis Energy	The Bord Gáis Energy Munster GAA Hurling Under-21 Championship
2019-	(Republic of Ireland) Bord Gáis Energy	The Bord Gáis Energy Munster GAA Hurling Under-20 Championship

== General statistics ==
=== Performance by county ===
	County	Wins	Runners-up	Years won	Years runner-up
1	Tipperary	23	16	1964, 1965, 1967, 1972, 1978, 1979, 1980, 1981, 1983, 1984, 1985, 1989, 1990, 1995, 1999, 2003, 2004, 2006, 2008, 2010, 2019, 2024, 2025	1968, 1969, 1970, 1971, 1997, 1998, 2001, 2002, 2005, 2012, 2013, 2016, 2018, 2020, 2022, 2026
2	Cork	22	14	1966, 1968, 1969, 1970, 1971, 1973, 1975, 1976, 1977, 1982, 1988, 1991, 1993, 1996, 1997, 1998, 2005, 2007, 2018, 2020, 2021, 2023	1978, 1979, 1980, 1981, 1987, 2000, 2003, 2004, 2006, 2011, 2014, 2017, 2019, 2024
3	Limerick	9	12	1986, 1987, 2000, 2001, 2002, 2011, 2015, 2017, 2022	1966, 1973, 1975, 1977, 1982, 1984, 1988, 1989, 1990, 1991, 1993, 2021
4	Clare	5	16	2009, 2012, 2013, 2014, 2026	1972, 1974, 1976, 1983, 1985, 1986, 1992, 1994, 1995, 1996, 1999, 2008, 2010, 2015, 2023, 2025
4	Waterford	4	3	1974, 1992, 1994, 2016	1964, 2007, 2009
5	Galway	0	2		1965, 1967

== Records ==
=== Final ===
==== Team ====
- Most titles: 23:
  - Tipperary (1964, 1965, 1967, 1972, 1978, 1979, 1980, 1981, 1983, 1984, 1985, 1989, 1990, 1995, 1999, 2003, 2004, 2006, 2008, 2010, 2019, 2024, 2025)
- Most consecutive title wins: 4, joint record:
  - Cork (1968, 1969, 1970, 1971)
  - Tipperary (1978, 1979, 1980, 1981)
- Most appearances in a final: 38:
  - Tipperary (1964, 1965, 1967, 1968, 1969, 1970, 1971, 1972, 1978, 1979, 1980, 1981, 1983, 1984, 1985, 1989, 1990, 1995, 1997, 1998, 1999, 2001, 2002, 2003, 2004, 2005, 2006, 2008, 2010, 2012, 2013, 2016, 2018, 2019, 2020, 2022, 2024, 2025)
- Most appearances without winning: 2:
  - Galway (1965, 1967)

==== Individual ====
- Most wins: 4, Mick Malone (Cork) (1968, 1969, 1970, 1971)

=== Teams ===
==== By decade ====
The most successful team of each decade, judged by number of championship titles, is as follows:

- 1960s: 3 each for Tipperary (1964-65-67) and Cork (1966-68-69)
- 1970s: 6 for Cork (1970-71-73-75-76-77)
- 1980s: 6 for Tipperary (1980-81-83-84-85-89)
- 1990s: 5 for Cork (1991-93-96-97-98)
- 2000s: 4 for Tipperary (2003-04-06-08)
- 2010s: 3 each for Limerick (2011-15-17) and Clare (2012-13-14)
- 2020s: 3 for Cork (2020-22-23)

==== Gaps ====
Top five longest gaps between successive championship titles:

- 22 years: Waterford (1994-2016)
- 18 years: Waterford (1974-1992)
- 13 years: Limerick (1987-2000)
- 11 years: Cork (2007-2018)
- 9 years: Limerick (2002-2011)
- 9 years: Tipperary (2010-2019)

=== Scoreline records ===
==== Munster finals ====
- The most one sided Munster finals:
  - 23 points – 1964: Tipperary 8–09 (33) – (10) 3–01 Waterford
  - 22 points – 1989: Tipperary 5–16 (31) – (9) 1–06 Limerick
  - 21 points – 2000: Limerick 4–18 (30) – (9) 1–06 Cork
  - 15 points – 1966: Cork 5–12 (27) – (12) 2–06 Limerick
  - 15 points – 2014: Clare 1–28 (31) – (16) 1–13 Cork

==== All matches ====
- The most one sided semi-finals and first round matches:
  - 40 points – 1988: Kerry 0–00 (0) – (40) 5–25 Tipperary
  - 39 points – 1997: Kerry 0–05 (5) – (44) 6–26 Cork
  - 35 points – 1967: Kerry 0–04 (4) – (40) 9–12 Tipperary
  - 34 points – 1972: Kerry 1–05 (8) – (40) 9–15 Limerick

=== Top scorers ===
==== Overall ====
As of the 2025 championship
Pos.	Name	Team	Goals	Points	Total
1	Darragh McCarthy	Tipperary	2	76	82
2	Eoin Kelly	Tipperary	4	60	72
2	Ben Cunningham	Cork	2	66	72
4	Joe Deane	Cork	12	30	66
5	Mark Keane	Limerick	3	56	65
6	Keith Smyth	Clare	3	53	62
7	Barry Walsh	Cork	3	47	56
7	Jack Leahy	Cork	1	53	56
9	Conor Whelan	Clare	0	55	55
10	Eugene O'Neill	Tipperary	8	30	54
10	Jason Forde	Tipperary	5	39	54

==== By year ====
Year	Top scorer	Team	Score	Total
1964	Michael "Babs" Keating	Tipperary	7–10	31
1965	Francis Loughnane	Tipperary	1–10	13
1966	Charlie McCarthy	Cork	4-09	21
1967	John Flanagan	Tipperary	8–12	36
1968				
1969	Bernie Meade	Cork	3–16	25
1970	Timmy Delaney	Tipperary	3-07	16
1971	Seánie O'Leary	Cork	3–15	24
1972	Joe Cunningham	Tipperary	3–14	23
1973	Tom Sheehan	Cork	5-17	32
1974	Mossy McNamara	Waterford	5-01	16
1975	David O'Riordan	Limerick	6-00	18
1976				
1977	Tom Dunne	Limerick	4-11	23
1978	Séamus Bourke	Tipperary	2-14	20
1979	Tommy Grogan	Tipperary	0-17	17
1980	Tony McGrath	Limerick	4-02	14
1980	Pat Power	Tipperary	3-05	14
1980	Philip Kennedy	Tipperary	0-14	14
1981	Tony Coyne	Cork	2-15	21
1982	Tony O'Sullivan	Cork	1-11	14
1983	Tony O'Sullivan	Cork	0-23	23
1984	Michael Scully	Tipperary	0-26	26
1985	Michael Scully	Tipperary	1-20	23
1986	Liam Dooley	Limerick	2-16	22
1987	Gary Kirby	Limerick	0-21	21
1988	Mike Galligan	Limerick	1-15	18
1989	Dan Quirke	Tipperary	4-04	16
1990	Liam Sheedy	Tipperary	0–16	16
1991	Frankie Carroll	Limerick	1–38	41
1992	Pádraig McNamara	Clare	0–17	17
1993	Mike Wallace	Limerick	7-04	25
1994	Paul Flynn	Waterford	3–17	26
1995	Tommy Dunne	Tipperary	0–22	22
1996	Joe Deane	Cork	4-09	21
1997	Eugene O'Neill	Tipperary	5–18	33
1998	Joe Deane	Cork	6–18	36
1999	Paddy O'Brien	Tipperary	2–19	25
2000	Mark Keane	Limerick	1–16	19
2001	Eoin Kelly	Tipperary	2–27	33
2002	Mark Keane	Limerick	0–22	22
2003	Eoin Kelly	Tipperary	2–12	18
2004	Tony Scroope	Tipperary	4-09	21
2005	Maurice O'Sullivan	Cork	4–12	24
2006	Darragh Egan	Tipperary	2-09	15
2007	Mark Gorman	Waterford	1–13	16
2008	Caimin Morey	Clare	2–12	18
2009	Colin Ryan	Clare	3–16	25
2010	Conor McGrath	Clare	1–17	20
2011	Jamie Coughlan	Cork	0–15	15
2012	John O'Dwyer	Tipperary	1–25	28
2013	Jason Forde	Tipperary	5–25	40
2014	Bobby Duggan	Clare	0–26	26
2015	Patrick Curran	Waterford	1–19	22
2016	Ronan Lynch	Limerick	1–17	20
2017	Aaron Gillane	Limerick	0–29	29
2018	Declan Dalton	Cork	0–15	15
2019	Jake Morris	Tipperary	1–16	19
2020	Devon Ryan	Tipperary	3–19	28
2021	Cathal O'Neill	Limerick	0–27	27
2022	Kyle Shelly	Tipperary	2-24	30
2022	Aidan O'Connor	Limerick	0-30	30
2022	Aaron Ryan	Waterford	0-30	30
2023	Keith Smyth	Clare	3-45	54
2024	Jack Leahy	Cork	1-50	53
2025	Fred Hegarty	Clare	2-45	51
2026	Cormac Fitzpatrick	Tipperary		

==== In a single game ====
Year	Top scorer	Team	Score	Total
1964	Pat McNamara	Clare	5-01	16
1965	Frank Coffey	Galway	2-03	9
1965	Francis Loughnane	Tipperary	1-06	9
1966	Charlie McCarthy	Cork	2-03	9
1966	Justin McCarthy	Cork	2-03	9
1967	John Flanagan	Tipperary	3-05	14
1968				
1969	Bernie Meade	Cork	2-09	15
1970	Paul Byrne	Tipperary	3-02	11
1971	Seánie O'Leary	Cork	1-09	12
1972				
1973	Tom Sheehan	Cork	3-06	15
1983	Martin McGrath	Tipperary	1-08	11
1984	Val Donnellan	Clare	1-07	10
1985	Michael Scully	Tipperary	1-10	13
1986	Liam Dooley	Limerick	1-09	12
1987	Gary Kirby	Limerick	0-10	10
1988	Leo O'Connor	Limerick	1-07	10
1989	Dan Quirke	Tipperary	3-00	9
1990	Seán Daly	Waterford	1-08	11
1991	Seán Daly	Waterford	3-02	11
1991	Brian Cunningham	Cork	0–11	11
1992	Brian Corcoran	Cork	0–10	10
1993	Mike Wallace	Limerick	3-03	12
1994	Paul Flynn	Waterford	2–11	17
1995	Tommy Dunne	Tipperary	0–10	10
1996	Joe Deane	Cork	2-05	11
1997	Eugene O'Neill	Tipperary	3-05	14
1998	Joe Deane	Cork	3-04	13
1998	Joe Deane	Cork	2-07	13
1999	Ken McGrath	Waterford	2-07	13
2000	Mark Keane	Limerick	1-09	12
2001	Eoin Kelly	Tipperary	2-09	15
2002	Eoin Kelly	Waterford	0-09	9
2003	Andrew O'Shaughnessy	Limerick	2-03	9
2003	Eoin Kelly	Tipperary	1-06	9
2004	Tony Scroope	Tipperary	3-03	12
2005	Alan O'Connor	Limerick	1-07	10
2006	Brendan Barry	Cork	2-04	10
2007	Mark Gorman	Waterford	1-07	10
2008	Caimin Morey	Clare	1-08	11
2009	Colin Ryan	Clare	3-09	18
2010	Conor McGrath	Clare	1-08	11
2011	John O'Dwyer	Tipperary	0–11	11
2012	Shane Dowling	Limerick	1-08	11
2013	Jason Forde	Tipperary	2-08	14
2014	Jason Forde	Tipperary	0–12	12
2015	Ronan Lynch	Limerick	0–13	13
2015	Bobby Duggan	Clare	0–13	13
2016	Ronan Lynch	Limerick	1-08	11
2017	Declan Dalton	Cork	1–12	15
2018	Declan Dalton	Cork	0-08	8
2019	Jake Morris	Tipperary	0-13	13
2020	Devon Ryan	Tipperary	2-10	16
2021	Cathal O'Neill	Limerick	0-16	16
2022	Kyle Shelly	Tipperary	1-10	13
2023	Ben Cunningham	Cork	1-10	13
2024	Conor Whelan	Clare	0-16	16

==== In finals ====
Final	Top scorer	Team	Score	Total
1964	Michael "Babs" Keating	Tipperary	3-03	12
1965	Jack Ryan	Tipperary	2-00	6
1966	Charlie McCarthy	Cork	1-05	8
1967	John Flanagan	Tipperary	2-05	11
1968	Simon Murphy	Cork	1-01	4
1968	Pat Hegarty	Cork	1-01	4
1968	Paddy Ring	Cork	1-01	4
1968	Eddie Morrissey	Tipperary	1-01	4
1969	Bernie Meade	Cork	1-05	8
1970	Timmy Delaney	Tipperary	2-04	10
1971	Seánie O'Leary	Cork	1-09	12
1972	Joe Cunningham	Tipperary	2-04	10
1973	Tom Sheehan	Cork	2-05	11
1974	Paul Moore	Waterford	2-00	6
1975	Jimmy Barry-Murphy	Cork	2-01	7
1976	Brendan Gilligan	Clare	2-02	8
1977	Tadhg Murphy	Cork	1-02	5
1977	Danny Buckley	Cork	1-02	5
1978	Pat Fitzelle (D)	Tipperary	0-07	7
1978	Séamus Burke (R)	Tipperary	1-02	5
1978	Danny Buckley (R)	Cork	1-02	5
1979	Tommy Grogan	Tipperary	0-08	8
1980	Joe Kennedy	Tipperary	2-00	6
1980	Tony Coyne	Cork	1-03	6
1981	Donie O'Connell	Tipperary	1-02	5
1982	Tony O'Sullivan	Cork	0-05	5
1983	Martin McGrath	Tipperary	0-07	7
1983	Val Donnellan	Clare	0-07	7
1984	Michael Scully	Tipperary	0-06	6
1985	Michael Scully	Tipperary	1–10	13
1986	Liam Dooley (D)	Limerick	1-04	7
1986	Gary Kirby (R)	Limerick	0-05	5
1987	Gary Kirby	Limerick	0–10	10
1988	Mickey Mullins	Cork	0-07	7
1989	Dan Quirke	Tipperary	3-00	9
1990	Liam Sheedy	Tipperary	0-09	9
1991	Brian Cunningham	Cork	0–11	11
1992	Noel Dalton	Waterford	0-07	7
1993	Mike Wallace	Limerick	2-01	7
1993	John Anthony Moran	Limerick	0-07	7
1994	Paul Flynn	Waterford	1-06	9
1995	Tommy Dunne	Tipperary	0–10	10
1996	Joe Deane	Cork	2-05	11
1997	Eugene O'Neill	Tipperary	0-06	9
1997	Mickey O'Connell	Cork	0-06	9
1998	Joe Deane	Cork	1-07	10
1999	Alan Markham	Clare	1-06	9
1999	Paddy O'Brien	Tipperary	0-09	9
2000	Mark Keane	Limerick	1-09	12
2001	Eoin Kelly	Tipperary	2-09	15
2002	Mark Keane	Limerick	0-07	7
2003	Eoin Kelly	Tipperary	1-06	9
2004	Tony Scroope	Tipperary	1-04	7
2005	Maurice O'Sullivan	Cork	2-02	8
2006	Darragh Egan	Tipperary	1-04	7
2007	Cathal Naughton	Cork	1-04	7
2008	Séamus Callanan	Tipperary	1-05	8
2009	Darach Honan	Clare	2-02	8
2010	Conor McGrath	Clare	1-08	11
2011	Jamie Coughlan	Cork	0–10	10
2012	John O'Dwyer	Tipperary	1-07	10
2013	Jason Forde	Tipperary	2-07	13
2014	Bobby Duggan	Clare	0–10	10
2015	Ronan Lynch	Limerick	0–13	13
2016	Patrick Curran	Waterford	0-08	8
2017	Aaron Gillane	Limerick	0-06	6
2018	Declan Dalton	Cork	0-07	7
2019	Conor Bowe	Tipperary	1-04	7
2020	Andrew Ormond	Tipperary	1-03	6
2021	Cathal O'Neill	Limerick	0-16	16
2022	Kyle Shelly	Tipperary	1-06	9
2022	Aidan O'Connor	Limerick	0-09	9
2023	Keith Smyth	Clare	0-11	11
2024	Darragh McCarthy	Tipperary	0-10	10

=== Attendance ===
==== Finals ====
Year	Att.
2008	11,287
2009	6,635
2010	11,450
2011	8,536
2012	8,379
2013	8,296
2014	12,995
2015	14,311
2016	8,843
2017	11,744
2018	6,732
2019	9,117
2020	0

=== Miscellaneous ===
- Mick Malone of Cork holds the record of being the only player to win four consecutive Munster under-21 winners' medals on the field of play. These victories came in 1968, 1969, 1970 and 1971.
- Cork and Tipperary jointly hold the record for the longest streak of success. Both counties have won four-in-a-row with Cork's coming between 1968 and 1971 and Tipperary's coming a decade later between 1978 and 1981.
- Cork hold the record for the most consecutive appearances in Munster finals. They played in eight-in-a-row between 1975 and 1982, not including a replay in 1978, with success coming on four of those occasions.
- Clare lost twelve Munster finals, not including a replay in 1986, before winning their first in 2009.
- Two counties have completed the Munster under-21 and senior double in the same year:
  - Cork in 1966, 1969, 1970, 1975, 1976, 1977, 1982, 2005
  - Tipperary in 1964, 1965, 1967, 1989, 2008, 2019
- Cork is the only county to have completed the Munster minor, under-21 and senior treble in the same year. These feats were achieved in 1966, 1969, 1970, 1975, 1977 and 2005.
- Cork is the only county to have completed the Munster minor, under-21, intermediate and senior 'grand slam' in the same year. This was achieved in 2005.
- Five players have captained their counties to Munster titles in both the under-21 and senior grades:
  - Gerald McCarthy captained Cork to the under-21 title in 1966 and the senior titles in 1966 and 1975.
  - Eoin Kelly captained Tipperary to the under-21 title in 2003 and the senior title in 2008.
- Five players have captained their counties to Munster titles in both the minor and under-21 grades:
  - Anthony O'Riordan captained Limerick to the minor title in 1984 and the under-21 title in 1986.
  - Diarmaid FitzGerald captained Tipperary to the minor title in 2001 and the under-21 title in 2004.
  - Shane O'Neill captained Cork to the minor title in 2004 and the under-21 title in 2007.
  - Paul Flanagan captained Clare to the minor title in 2010 and the Under-21 title in 2013.
  - Tony Kelly captained Clare to the minor title in 2011 and the Under-21 title in 2014.

== List of Munster Finals ==
All-Ireland champions
All-Ireland runners-up

Year	Winners	Score	Runners-up	Score	Venue	Winning Captain(s)
1964	Tipperary	8–09	Waterford	3–01	Walsh Park	Francis Loughnane
1965	Tipperary	4–09	Galway	3–03	Dunlo GAA Grounds	Owen Killoran
1966	Cork	5–12	Limerick	2–06	Cork Athletic Grounds	Gerald McCarthy
1967	Tipperary	3–09	Galway	3–05	Gaelic Grounds	P.J. Ryan
1968	Cork	4–10	Tipperary	1–13	Thurles Sportsfield	Pat Hegarty
1969	Cork	3–11	Tipperary	1–05	Cork Athletic Grounds	Donal Clifford
1970	Cork	3–11	Tipperary	2–07	Thurles Sportsfield	Teddy O'Brien
1971	Cork	5–11	Tipperary	4–09	Cork Athletic Grounds	Pat McDonnell
1972	Tipperary	4–10	Clare	3–10	Cusack Park	Willie Ryan
1973	Cork	4–11	Limerick	2–07	Charleville GAA Grounds	Martin O'Doherty
1974	Waterford	2–05	Clare	1–03		Pat McGrath
1975	Cork	3–12	Limerick	2–06	Gaelic Grounds	Frank O'Sullivan
1976	Cork	2–11	Clare	3–06	Gaelic Grounds	Tadhg Murphy
1977	Cork	5–09	Limerick	1–08	Kilmallock	Tom Lyons
1978	Tipperary	3–08	Cork	2–09	Páirc Uí Chaoimh	Pat Fitzelle
1979	Tipperary	1–13	Cork	2–07	Semple Stadium	Michael Doyle
1980	Tipperary	4–11	Cork	2–09	Páirc Mac Gearailt	P. J. Maxwell
1981	Tipperary	1–15	Cork	0–10	Semple Stadium	Philip Kennedy
1982	Cork	1–14	Limerick	1–04	FitzGerald Park, Kilmallock	Martin McCarthy
1983	Tipperary	2–17	Clare	3–08	Cusack Park	Denis Finnerty
1984	Tipperary	0–12	Limerick	1–08	Gaelic Grounds	Donal Kealy
1985	Tipperary	1–16	Clare	4–05	Semple Stadium	Michael Scully
1986	Limerick	2–10	Clare	0–03	Cusack Park	Anthony O'Riordan
1987	Limerick	3–14	Cork	2–09	Bruff Sportsfield	Gussie Ryan
1988	Cork	4–12	Limerick	1–07	Clonmult Memorial Park	Christy Connery
1989	Tipperary	5–16	Limerick	1–06	Semple Stadium	Declan Ryan
1990	Tipperary	2–21	Limerick	1–11	Gaelic Grounds	John Leahy
1991	Cork	0–17	Limerick	1–07	FitzGerald Park, Kilmallock	Brian Cunningham
1992	Waterford	0–17	Clare	1–12	Semple Stadium	Tony Browne
1993	Cork	1–18	Limerick	3–09	Páirc Uí Chaoimh	Fergal O'Mahony
1994	Waterford	1–12	Clare	0–12	Páirc Mac Gearailt	James O'Connor
1995	Tipperary	1–17	Clare	0–14	Semple Stadium	Brian Horgan
1996	Cork	3–16	Clare	2–07	Semple Stadium	Seánie McGrath
1997	Cork	1–11	Tipperary	0–13	Semple Stadium, Thurles	Dan Murphy
1998	Cork	3–18	Tipperary	1–10	Páirc Uí Chaoimh	Dan Murphy
1999	Tipperary	1–18	Clare	1–15	Cusack Park, Ennis	William Hickey
2000	Limerick	4–18	Cork	1–06	Gaelic Grounds	Donncha Sheehan
2001	Limerick	3–14	Tipperary	2–16	Gaelic Grounds	Timmy Houlihan
2002	Limerick	1–20	Tipperary	2–14	Semple Stadium	Peter Lawlor
2003	Tipperary	2–14	Cork	0–17	Páirc Uí Chaoimh	Eoin Kelly
2004	Tipperary	1–16	Cork	1–13	Semple Stadium	Diarmaid FitzGerald
2005	Cork	4–08	Tipperary	0–13	Páirc Uí Chaoimh	Pat FitzGerald
2006	Tipperary	3–11	Cork	0–13	Semple Stadium	David Young
2007	Cork	1–20	Waterford	0–10	Walsh Park	Shane O'Neill
2008	Tipperary	1–16	Clare	2–12	Cusack Park	Séamus Hennessy
2009	Clare	2–17	Waterford	2–12	Fraher Field	Ciarán O'Doherty
2010	Tipperary	1–22	Clare	1–17	Semple Stadium	Pádraic Maher
2011	Limerick	4–20	Cork	1–27	Gaelic Grounds	Kevin Downes
2012	Clare	1–16	Tipperary	1–14	Cusack Park	Conor McGrath
2013	Clare	1–17	Tipperary	2–10	Semple Stadium	Paul Flanagan
2014	Clare	1–28	Cork	1–13	Cusack Park	Tony Kelly
2015	Limerick	0–22	Clare	0–19	Cusack Park	Diarmaid Byrnes
2016	Waterford	2–19	Tipperary	0–15	Walsh Park	Adam Farrell & Patrick Curran
2017	Limerick	0–16	Cork	1–11	Gaelic Grounds	Tom Morrissey
2018	Cork	2–23	Tipperary	1–13	Pairc Ui Chaoimh	Shane Kingston
2019	Tipperary	3–15	Cork	2–17	Semple Stadium	Craig Morgan
2020	Cork	1-16	Tipperary	1-14	Páirc Uí Chaoimh	Conor O'Callaghan
2021	Cork	1-26	Limerick	1-24	Páirc Uí Chaoimh	Cormac O'Brien
2022	Limerick	1-25	Tipperary	2-18	TUS Gaelic Grounds	Jimmy Quilty
2023	Cork	1-23	Clare	1-21	TUS Gaelic Grounds	Micheál Mullins
2024	Tipperary	1-19	Cork	0-21	TUS Gaelic Grounds	Ben Currivan
2025	Tipperary	3-19	Clare	1-20	TUS Gaelic Grounds	Sam O'Farrell
2026	Clare	2-24	Tipperary	2-24	TUS Gaelic Grounds	

Notes:

- 1978 - The first match ended in a draw: Tipperary 3-13, Cork 4-10 at Semple Stadium.
- 1986 - The first match ended in a draw: Limerick 3-09, Clare 3-09 at the Gaelic Grounds.
- 2000 - The first match ended in a draw: Limerick 1-13, Cork 1-13 at Páirc Uí Chaoimh.
- 2026 - Match ended level after extra time. Clare won 4-3 on penalties at Gaelic Grounds.

== Sources ==
- Complete list of winning teams from Munster GAA website
