= 1981 All-Ireland Under-21 Hurling Championship =

All-Ireland Under-21 Hurling Championship 1981
All Ireland Champions
- Winners: Tipperary (5th win)
- Captain: Philip Kennedy
- Manager: Michael Minogue

All Ireland Runners-up
- Runners-up: Kilkenny
- Captain: John Murphy
- Manager: Ollie Walsh

Provincial Champions
- Munster: Tipperary
- Leinster: Kilkenny
- Ulster: Antrim
- Connacht: Not Played

The 1981 All-Ireland Under-21 Hurling Championship was the 18th staging of the All-Ireland Under-21 Hurling Championship since its establishment by the Gaelic Athletic Association in 1964.

Tipperary entered the championship as the defending champions.

On 13 September 1981, Tipperary won the championship following a 2-16 to 1-10 defeat of Kilkenny in the All-Ireland final. This was their fifth All-Ireland title in the under-21 grade and their third in succession.

== Results ==
=== Leinster Under-21 Hurling Championship ===
Final

9 August 1981 Final	Kilkenny	6-11 - 2-10	Wexford	Nowlan Park, Kilkenny
	B Walton 1-7, W Purcell 2-3, J Murphy 2-0, J O'Dwyer 1-0, M Byrne 0-1.		P Cummins 1-1, J McDonald 1-0, S Whelan 0-3, D Murphy 0-2, J Furlong 0-1, J Casey 0-1, B Byrne 0-1, M Fitzhenry 0-1.	Referee: J Rankins (Laois)

=== Munster Under-21 Hurling Championship ===
First round

22 April 1981 First round	Tipperary	5-17 - 1-01	Kerry	Semple Stadium, Thurles
	M McGrath 0-8, G O'Neill 1-2, A Buckley 1-1, D O'Connell 1-1, A Kinsella 1-0, J Butler 1-0, B Ryan 0-3, J Sullivan 0-1, P McGrath 0-1.		P Leen 1-0, M Bourke 0-1.	Referee: J Moore (Waterford)

22 April 1981 First round	Cork	0-15 - 1-12	Clare	Bruff
	T Coyne 0-7, S O'Gorman 0-5, J Hartnett 0-1, T Coakley 0-1, G Walsh 0-1.		G McInerney 1-5, T Nugent 0-3, M Chandler 0-2, N Earley 0-2.

6 May 1981 First round replay	Cork	3-08 - 3-06	Clare	Bruff
	T Coyne 2-3, J Hartnett 1-1, K Hennessy 0-1, D Walsh 0-1, N O'Sullivan 0-1, L Mulcahy 0-1.		G McInerney 2-4, JP Meehan 1-0, M Chandler 0-1, S Fitzpatrick 0-1.	Referee: N O'Connor (Kerry)

Semi-finals

13 May 1981 Semi-final	Tipperary	6-14 - 1-03	Waterford	Semple Stadium, Thurles
	D O'Connell 2-1, A Buckley 2-0, G O'Neill 1-2, B Ryan 1-1, N English 0-4, A Kinsella 0-3, M McGrath 0-2, P Kennedy 0-1.		E Rockett 1-1, P Bennett 0-2.

24 June 1981 Semi-final	Limerick	0-10 - 1-14	Cork	Gaelic Grounds, Limerick
	T Bourke 0-4, M O'Brien 0-2, M Ryan 0-1, G Bourke 0-1, D Fitzgerald 0-1, M O'Connor 0-1.		M O'Sullivan 1-2, K Hennessy 0-5, T McCarthy 0-2, J Bowen 0-1, J Hartnett 0-1, W Cashman 0-1, D Walsh 0-1, L Lynch 0-1.

Final

15 July 1981 Final	Tipperary	1-15 - 0-10	Cork	Semple Stadium, Thurles
	D O'Connell 1-2, N English 0-3, A Buckley 0-3, P Kennedy 0-2, M McGrath 0-2, G O'Neill 0-1, B Ryan 0-1, P McGrath 0-1.		T Coyne 0-5, K Hennessy 0-2, B Lotty 0-1, J Hartnett 0-1, M O'Sullivan 0-1.

=== All-Ireland Under-21 Hurling Championship ===
Semi-finals

16 August 1981 Semi-final	Kilkenny	3-23 - 0-03	Antrim	Croke Park, Dublin
	B Walton 1-5, J Murphy 1-5, B Purcell 1-2, P Gannon 0-4, S Dwyer 0-3, M O'Connor 0-2, B McEvoy 0-1, MJ Ryan 0-1.		A McNaughton 0-2, P Carey 0-1.	Referee: N Duggan (Limerick)

23 August 1981 Semi-final	Tipperary	3-17 - 0-07	Galway	Cusack Park, Ennis
	M McGrath 0-6, A Buckley 1-2, G O'Neill 0-5, D O'Connell 1-1, N English 1-0, P McGrath 0-1, A Kinsella 0-1, R Ryan 0-1.		M Haverty 0-4, S Dolan 0-3.	Referee: G Kirwan (Offaly)

Final

13 September 1981 Final	Tipperary	2-16 - 1-10	Kilkenny	Walsh Park, Waterford
	D O'Connell 2-1, G O'Neill 0-6, M McGrath 0-5, N English 0-2, B Ryan 0-1, P McGrath 0-1.		B Walton 1-7, M Byrne 0-1, P Gannon 0-1, MJ Ryan 0-1.	Referee: N Duggan (Limerick)
