= Joe McKenna =

Limerick and Offaly hurler and manager

Personal information
- Native name: Seosamh Mac Cionnaith (Irish)
- Born: 10 June 1951 (age 75) Shinrone, County Offaly, Ireland
- Occupation: Businessman
- Height: 6 ft 3 in (191 cm)

Sport
- Sport: Hurling
- Position: Full Forward
Clubs
- Years: Club
- Shinrone; South Liberties
Club titles
- Limerick titles: 4
Inter-county*
Years	County	Apps (scores)
1969–1973 1973–1985	Offaly; Limerick	2 (0–00); 30 (18–38)
Inter-county titles
- Munster titles: 4
- All-Irelands: 1
- All Stars: 6
- *Inter County team apps and scores correct as of 20:27, 18 March 2020.

Joe McKenna (born 10 June 1951 in Shinrone, County Offaly) is an Irish former hurler who played for his local club Shinrone in Offaly and later at senior level for the Offaly county team, before transferring to South Liberties and playing at senior level for the Limerick county team. From 1970 to 1973 he represented Offaly, playing two championship and 18 league matches. From 1974 until 1985 he played for Limerick.

McKenna later served as manager of the Limerick senior county team. He operates a business, selling tools, machinery and DIY equipment in Limerick city.

== Playing career ==
=== Club ===
Having transferred from Shinrone, McKenna played his club hurling with the famous South Liberties club in Limerick and enjoyed much success. He won his first senior county title in 1972. Four years later in 1976 McKenna captured a second county medal, however, South Liberties were later defeated by Glen Rovers in the Munster club final. 1978 saw him add a third county title before collecting a fourth county medal in 1981. Once again South Liberties were later defeated by Mount Sion in the Munster club final.

=== Inter-county ===
McKenna first represented Offaly in the 1970 National hurling league making his debut against Dublin. He played for Offaly in the 1971 and 1972 championship and made his final appearance for the Faithful county in February 1973. Later in 1973 he switched allegiance and joined the Limerick senior team, however, it would take some time before he gained a regular place on the team. In 1973 McKenna was a non-playing substitute when Limerick defeated Tipperary to win the Munster title for the first time since 1955. Although he played no part in that game he was on the starting fifteen for the subsequent All-Ireland final against Kilkenny. Limerick outplayed Kilkenny throughout the eighty minutes and captured a 1–21 to 1–14 victory, giving McKenna his sole All-Ireland medal. In 1974 he won his first Munster title on the field of play as Limerick trounced Clare in the provincial final. McKenna's side later faced Kilkenny for the second year in-a-row, however, 'the Cats' had a comfortable twelve-point victory over Limerick. The team faded out of the limelight for a number of years, however, Limerick bounced back in 1980 with McKenna capturing a second Munster title. His side later took on Galway in the championship decider, however, for the first time since 1923 the men from the West captured the All-Ireland title in an emotional display at Croke Park. Limerick were back in 1981 with McKenna adding a third Munster medal to his collection. Unfortunately, Limerick were later defeated by Gaway in an All-Ireland semi-final replay. Now in the twilight of his career McKenna captured a National Hurling League medal in 1984. He retired from inter-county hurling in 1985. He was honoured with 6 All stars in 1974, 1975, 1978, 1979, 1980 and 1981.

=== Provincial ===
McKenna also lined out with Munster in the inter-provincial hurling competition and won Railway Cup titles in 1976, 1981 and 1984.

== Managing Limerick ==
In retirement as a player McKenna took over as manager of the Limerick senior team in 2005. His tenure was not a happy one and he resigned following Limerick's defeat by Clare in the 2006 Munster quarter-final.

== Career statistics ==
Team	Year	National League			Leinster		All-Ireland		Total	
Team	Year	Division	Apps	Score	Apps	Score	Apps	Score	Apps	Score
Offaly	1970-71	Division 1A	6	1-01	1	0-00	—		7	1-01
Offaly	1971-72	Division 1A	6	2-02	1	0-00	—		7	2-02
Offaly	1972-73	Division 1A	7	0-06	—		—		7	0-06
Offaly	Total		19	3-09	2	0-00	—		21	3-09
Team	Year	National League			Munster		All-Ireland		Total	
Team	Year	Division	Apps	Score	Apps	Score	Apps	Score	Apps	Score
Limerick	1972-73	Division 1A	—		1	0-00	1	0-01	2	0-01
Limerick	1973-74	Division 1A	8	2-04	2	0-03	1	0-02	11	2-09
Limerick	1974-75	Division 1A	7	1-05	3	0-02	—		10	1-07
Limerick	1975-76	Division 1B	7	0-00	2	1-02	—		9	1-02
Limerick	1976-77	Division 1A	6	1-04	1	0-00	—		7	1-04
Limerick	1977-78	Division 1B	7	10-11	2	0-00	—		9	10-11
Limerick	1978-79	Division 1A	8	7-12	3	4-05	—		11	11-17
Limerick	1979-80	Division 1A	11	8-18	2	1-02	1	1-01	14	10-21
Limerick	1980-81	Division 1A	6	6-06	3	7-06	2	0-06	11	13-18
Limerick	1981-82	Division 1B	4	4-06	1	1-01	—		5	5-07
Limerick	1982-83	Division 2	5	4-05	2	2-04	—		7	6-09
Limerick	1983-84	Division 1	9	8-10	1	1-01	—		10	9-11
Limerick	1984-85	Division 1	—		2	0-02	—		2	0-02
Limerick	Total		78	51-81	25	17-28	5	1-10	108	69-119
Career total			97	54-90	27	17-28	5	1-10	129	72-128

Achievements
Preceded by Joe Connolly	Railway Cup final winning captain 1981	Succeeded by Seán Silke
Sporting positions
Preceded by Paudie Fitzmaurice	Limerick Senior Hurling Captain; 1982	Succeeded by Leonard Enright
Preceded by Pad Joe Whelahan	Limerick Senior Hurling Manager; 2005–2006	Succeeded by Richie Bennis
