= Séamus Bourke (hurler) =

Irish hurler, played for County Tipperary

Personal information
- Native name: Séamus de Búrca (Irish)
- Born: 1957 (age 68–69) Clonmore, County Tipperary, Ireland

Sport
- Sport: Hurling
- Position: Full-forward
Clubs
- Years: Club
- Clonmore; J.K. Bracken's
Club titles
- Tipperary titles: 0
Inter-county*
Years	County	Apps (scores)
1978-	Tipperary	5 (2-7)
Inter-county titles
- Munster titles: 0
- All-Irelands: 0
- NHL: 0
- All Stars: 0
- *Inter County team apps and scores correct as of 17:43, 24 May 2016.

Séamus Bourke (born 1957) is an Irish retired hurler who played as a full-forward for the Tipperary senior team.
