= 1980 All-Ireland Under-21 Hurling Championship =

All-Ireland Under-21 Hurling Championship 1980
All Ireland Champions
- Winners: Tipperary (4th win)
- Captain: Philip Kennedy
- Manager: Mick Minogue

All Ireland Runners-up
- Runners-up: Kilkenny
- Captain: Lester Ryan
- Manager: Fan Larkin

Provincial Champions
- Munster: Tipperary
- Leinster: Kilkenny
- Ulster: Antrim
- Connacht: Not Played

The 1980 All-Ireland Under-21 Hurling Championship was the 17th staging of the All-Ireland Under-21 Hurling Championship since its establishment by the Gaelic Athletic Association in 1964.

Tipperary were the defending champions.

On 14 September 1980, Tipperary won the championship following a 2-9 to 0-14 defeat of Kilkenny in the All-Ireland final. This was their fourth All-Ireland title in the under-21 grade and their second in succession.

== Results ==
=== Leinster Under-21 Hurling Championship ===
Final

27 July 1980 Final	Kilkenny	2-14 - 2-09	Wexford	Dr. Cullen Park, Carlow
	J Heffernan 1-3, M Nash 0-6, W Purcell 1-1, G Ryan 0-2, L Ryan 0-1, J Mulcahy 0-1.		S O'Leary 1-0, B Maher 1-0, J Jordan 0-3, P O'Gorman 0-1, J Fleming 0-1, G O'Connor 0-1, M Hanrick 0-1, J O'Connor 0-1, G Sweeney 0-1.	Attendance: 5,000; Referee: J Rankin (Laois)

=== Munster Under-21 Hurling Championship ===
First round

18 April 1980 First round	Clare	6-13 - 5-01	Waterford	Canon Hayes Park, Bansha
	J Lynch 2-4, C Lyons 1-2, G McInerney 1-2, L Quinlan 1-0, C Mahon 1-0, F Quilligan 0-3, PJ Deasy 0-2.		M Walsh 2-0, P Curran 1-1, E Rockett 1-0, P Power 1-0.

23 April 1980 First round	Limerick	6-13 - 0-04	Kerry	Gaelic Grounds, Limerick
	T McGrath 3-1, M Coffey 1-5, S Herbert 1-0, G Hickey 1-0, O O'Connor 0-3, T Burke 0-2, J Mann 0-1, M O'Connor 0-1.		L O'Mahony 0-2, M Bourke 0-1, J Sheehan 0-1.

Semi-finals

1 May 1980 Semi-final	Cork	1-11 - 1-08	Clare	Bruff
	P Barry 0-4, K Hennessy 1-0, J Hartnett 0-2, M O'Sullivan 0-2, D Murphy 0-1, S O'Gorman 0-1, F Scanlon 0-1.		G McInerney 1-2, L Quinlan 0-2, J Deasy 0-1, C Lyons 0-1, J Lynch 0-1, F Quilligan 0-1.	Referee: G Ryan (Tipperary)

9 May 1980 Semi-final	Limerick	1-17 - 3-11	Tipperary	Gaelic Grounds, Limerick
	T Burke 0-7, T McGrath 1-1, J Mann 0-3, O O'Connor 0-3, M Moloney 0-1, M Coffey 0-1, E Mescall 0-1.		P Kennedy 0-5, P McGrath 1-1, T O'Connell 1-0, M Murphy 1-0 (og), D O'Connell 0-2, P Power 0-2, M Kennedy 0-1.	Referee: F Murphy (Cork)

24 May 1980 Semi-final replay	Tipperary	2-13 - 1-09	Limerick	Semple Stadium, Thurles
	P Power 1-3, M Murphy 1-2, P Kennedy 0-4, P McGrath 0-2, M Kennedy 0-1, D O'Connell 0-1.		T Burke 0-4, P Collins 1-0, P Foley 0-2, O O'Connor 0-2, B Carroll 0-1.

Final

6 August 1980 Final	Cork	2-09 - 4-11	Tipperary	Páirc Mac Gearailt, Fermoy
	T Coyne 1-3, R O'Connor 1-2, W Ashman 0-1, K Hennessy 0-1, M O'Sullivan 0-1, T McCarthy 0-1.		J Kennedy 2-0, P Kennedy 0-5, P McGrath 1-1, P Power 1-0, A Buckley 0-2, B Ryan 0-1, J Dwyer 0-1.

=== All-Ireland Under-21 Hurling Championship ===
Semi-finals

17 August 1980 Semi-final	Kilkenny	2-13 - 1-11	Antrim	Croke Park, Dublin
	B Purcell 1-5, G Ryan 1-0, R Murphy 0-2, J Mulcahy 0-2, M Nash 0-2, L Ryan 0-1, A Brophy 0-1.		T Burton 0-6, B Donnelly 1-1, D Donnelly 0-2, D Laverty 0-1, T Donnelly 0-1.	Referee: N O'Donoghue (Dublin)

17 August 1980 Semi-final	Tipperary	3-11 - 2-12	Galway	Cusack Park, Ennis
	A Buckley 2-3, P Kennedy 0-4, R Power 1-0, B Ryan 0-1, M Murphy 0-1, P McGrath 0-1, B Heffernan 0-1.		M Haverty 1-3, S Dolan 1-2, G Lally 0-2, J Coen 0-2, S Fahy 0-2, P Hurney 0-1.	Referee: G Kirwan (Offaly)

Final

14 September 1980 Final	Tipperary	2-9 - 0-14	Kilkenny	Croke Park, Dublin
	M Murphy 1-1, A Buckley 1-0, J Kennedy 0-3, P Power 0-3, P McGrath 0-2.		B Purcell 0-4, M Nash 0-4, B McEvoy 0-3, L Ryan 0-1, E Wallace 0-1, J Mulcahy 0-1.	Referee: J Denton (Waterford)
