= Tadhg Murphy (dual player) =

Irish former sportsperson (born 1956)

Personal information
- Native name: Tadhg Ó Murchú (Irish)
- Born: 2 November 1956 (age 69) Glanmire, County Cork, Ireland
- Occupation: Insurance broker
- Height: 6 ft 0 in (183 cm)

Sport
- Football Position: Right Wing-Forward
- Hurling Position: Right Wing-Forward
Clubs
Years	Club	Apps (scores)
1973-1991 1975-1986 1974-2001	Glanmire → Imokilly; Sarsfields	8 (0-12); 28 (12-28)
Club titles
	Football	Hurling
Cork titles	2	0
Inter-county
Years	County	Apps (scores)
1977 1976-1984	Cork (SH); Cork (SF)	1 (0-00); 10 (3-09)
Inter-county titles
	Football	Hurling
Munster Titles	1	0
All-Ireland Titles	0	1
League titles	0	0

Tadhg Murphy (born 2 November 1956) is an Irish former hurler and Gaelic footballer. At club level he played with Glanmire, Sarsfields and Imokilly and was a member of the Cork senior teams as a dual player. Murphy is best remembered for scoring a last-minute goal to deny Kerry a record ninth successive title in the 1983 Munster final. He has 2 kids, Katie and Tadhg Óg Murphy. He has 3 grandchildren, Liam, Olivia & Molly Murphy.

== Early life ==
Born and raised in Glanmire, County Cork, Murphy first played as a schoolboy in various juvenile competitions before later lining out as a student at St Finbarr's College in Cork. He was a member of the St. Finbarr's team that won three successive Harty Cup titles from 1972 to 1974. Murphy also won All-Ireland titles with the college in 1972 and as team captain in 1974.

== Club career ==
Murphy's club career began as a 9-year-old member of the Glanmire-Sarsfields under-14 teams. He won county titles in this grade in both hurling and football in 1968. His other underage honours include a Cork U21HC title in 1975. By this stage Murphy had joined the respective clubs' top adult teams, making his debut with the Glanmire intermediate football team in 1973 and lining out with Sarsfields for the first time in 1974.

Murphy's performances at club level with Glanmire earned his inclusion on the Imokilly divisional team and he was at left corner-forward when St. Finbarr's were beaten in the 1984 final. He claimed a second winners' medal when St. Finbarr's were again beaten in the 1986 final. Murphy was denied a third winners' medal when Nemo Rangers beat Imokilly in the 1987 final, however, he had earlier claimed a Cork IFC title when Glanmire beat Fermoy.

The second half of Murphy's club career was dominated by hurling matters. He scored nine points when Sarsfields were beaten by Glen Rovers in the 1989 final, however, he ended the championship as top scorer with 3-27. Murphy was 40-years-old and lined out in goal when Sarsfields were beaten by Imokilly in the 1997 final. After leaving the senior ranks and joining the Sarsfields junior team, he ended his club career by winning an East Cork JHL medal in 2001.

== Inter-county career ==
Murphy began his inter-county career as a dual player when he was selected for both the Cork minor hurling and football teams in 1973. He won a Munster MFC medal that season before claiming both provincial titles in 1974. He ended that season with two All-Ireland medals as Cork completed the double following defeats of Kilkenny and Mayo in the respective finals. Murphy's three seasons with the Cork under-21 hurling team was bookended by All-Ireland final defeats in 1975 and 1977, however, he claimed a winners' medal as team captain in 1976.

By that stage Murphy had already been drafted onto the Cork senior football team and was an unused substitute in their defeat by Kerry in the 1976 Munster final. He switched codes to join the Cork senior hurling team a year later and made his only championship appearance when he came on as a substitute for Gerald McCarthy in the 1977 All-Ireland final defeat of Wexford.

Murphy subsequently committed solely to the Cork senior footballers and was off and on the team over the next few years, including further Munster final defeats by Kerry in 1979 and 1982. He scored a last-minute goal to deny Kerry a record ninth successive title in the 1983 Munster final. Murphy's last game for Cork was a defeat by Kerry in the 1984 Munster final.

== Management career ==
Murphy was heavily involved as a coach in all level with Sarsfields. He was player-manager when the club was beaten by Imokilly in the 1997 final. He later coached the club's under-14 team to their very first Féile na nGael title in 2000. Outside of his own club, Murphy managed Ardmore to successive titles by winning the Waterford JHC in 2001 and the Waterford IHC title in 2002.

== Personal life ==
Murphy's father, Bertie, was a long-serving player and administrator at club level who eventually became president of the Sarsfields club. His brother, Bertie Óg Murphy, was a two-time All-Ireland medal-winner with the Cork senior hurling team. Murphy's son, Tadhg Óg Murphy, also lined out with Cork.

== Honours ==
=== Player ===
St Finbarr's College

- Croke Cup: 1972, 1974 (c)
- Harty Cup: 1972, 1973, 1974 (c)

Glanmire

- Cork Intermediate Football Championship: 1987

Sarsfields

- Cork Under-21 Hurling Championship: 1975

Imokilly

- Cork Senior Football Championship: 1984, 1986

Cork

- All-Ireland Senior Hurling Championship: 1977
- Munster Senior Hurling Championship: 1977
- Munster Senior Football Championship: 1983
- All-Ireland Junior Football Championship: 1987
- Munster Junior Football Championship: 1986, 1987
- All-Ireland Under-21 Hurling Championship: 1976 (c)
- Munster Under-21 Hurling Championship: 1975, 1976 (c), 1977
- All-Ireland Minor Football Championship: 1974
- All-Ireland Minor Hurling Championship: 1974
- Munster Minor Hurling Championship: 1974
- Munster Minor Football Championship: 1973, 1974

=== Manager ===
Sarsfields

- Féile na nGael: 2000

Ardmore

- Waterford Intermediate Hurling Championship: 2002
- Waterford Junior Hurling Championship: 2001

Sporting positions
Preceded by Frank O'Sullivan	Cork under-21 hurling team captain 1976	Succeeded by Dermot MacCurtain
Achievements
Preceded by Kevin Fennelly	All-Ireland Under-21 Hurling Final winning captain 1976	Succeeded by Michael Lyng
