= Johnny Crowley =

Cork hurler

Personal information
- Native name: Seán Ó Crualaoich (Irish)
- Born: 21 February 1956 (age 70) Enniskean, County Cork, Ireland
- Occupation: Sales representative
- Height: 6 ft 0 in (183 cm)

Sport
- Sport: Hurling
- Position: Centre-back
Club
- Years: Club
- Bishopstown
Club titles
	Football	Hurling
Cork titles	0	0
Inter-county
Years	County	Apps (scores)
1976–1987	Cork	39 (0-00)
Inter-county titles
- Munster titles: 9
- All-Irelands: 5
- NHL: 1
- All Stars: 1

Johnny Crowley (born 21 February 1956) is an Irish former hurler who played as a centre-back at senior level for the Cork county team.

Born in Enniskean, County Cork, his family later moved to the city. He attended Coláiste an Spioraid Naoimh for a couple of years, but transferred to St Finbarr's College, Farranferris after 4th year. He first arrived on the inter-county scene at the age of eighteen when he first linked up with the Cork minor teams as a dual player, before later joining the Cork under-21 hurling team. He made his senior debut during the 1976 championship. Crowley enjoyed a decade-long career with Cork and won five All-Ireland medals, nine Munster medals and one National Hurling League medal. He was an All-Ireland runner-up on two occasions.

Crowley also lined out with Munster in the inter-provincial series, however, he never won a Railway Cup medal. At club level he enjoyed a lengthy career with Bishopstown.

Throughout his inter-county career, Crowley made 39 championship appearances for Cork. His retirement came following the conclusion of the 1987 championship.

In retirement from playing Crowley became involved in team management and coaching. As a selector under manager Jimmy Barry-Murphy, he has helped guide Cork to All-Ireland, Munster and National League successes. Crowley also served as manager of the Bishopstown senior team.

== Playing career ==
=== Club ===
Crowley played his club hurling and football with Bishopstown. He enjoyed little success with the relatively new club, however, he did win a city junior hurling championship medal in 1977.

=== Minor and under-21 ===
Crowley first came to prominence as a dual player of both hurling and Gaelic football with Cork in 1974. He won a Munster medal with the hurlers following a 2–11 to 2–7 defeat of Tipperary in a replay, while he also claimed a provincial medal with the footballers who bested old rivals Kerry by 0–13 to 1–6. The subsequent All-Ireland hurling final saw Cork narrowly defeat Kilkenny by 1–10 to 1–8, giving Crowley an All-Ireland Minor Hurling Championship medal. Two weeks later he was back in Croke Park as the footballers faced Mayo in the championship decider. Cork once again emerged victorious following a 1–10 to 1–6 victory. The win gave Crowley a unique double as he collected his second All-Ireland medal.

In 1975 Crowley was an automatic choice in defence for the Cork under-21 hurling team. He won a Munster medal that year following a 3–12 to 2–6 defeat of Limerick, before later lining out in the All-Ireland decider against Kilkenny. In what was rated as the best hurling game of the year, Cork looked likely champions, however, two great saves from Kevin Fennelly in the closing stages saw the Cats seal a 5–13 to 2–19 victory.

Cork continued their provincial dominance in 1976, with Crowley collecting a second Munster medal following a 2–11 to 3–6 win over Clare. The subsequent All-Ireland decider was a replay of the previous year, with Cork facing Kilkenny as underdogs. The Rebels powered to a 2–17 to 1–8 victory, giving Crowley his first All-Ireland medal in the grade.

Crowley collected a third consecutive Munster medal in 1977 as Limerick fell by 5–9 to 1–8. A third successive All-Ireland decider beckoned and, for the third year in-a-row, Kilkenny were the opponents. Only a goal separated the sides at the full-time whistle, however, victory went to Kilkenny by 2–9 to 1–9.

=== Senior ===
Crowley made his senior championship debut with Cork on 13 June 1976 in a 4–10 to 2–15 defeat of Tipperary. He later collected his first Munster medal as Cork trounced Limerick by 3–15 to 4–5 at the newly opened Páirc Uí Chaoimh. Wecford provided the opposition in the subsequent All-Ireland final on 5 September 1976. Wexford got off to a great start and were 2–2 to no score ahead after just six minutes. Wexford had a two-point lead with ten minutes to go, however, three points from Jimmy Barry-Murphy, two from Pat Moylan and a kicked effort from team captain Ray Cummins gave Cork a 2–21 to 4–11 victory. It was Crowley's first All-Ireland medal.

In 1977 Crowley won a second Munster medal following a 4–15 to 4–10 defeat of fourteen-man Clare. The All-Ireland final on 4 September 1977 was a repeat of the previous year, with Wexford providing the opposition once again. Seánie O'Leary scored the decisive goal for Cork as the game entered the last quarter, while Martin Coleman brought off a match-winning save from Christy Keogh to foil the Wexford comeback. A 1–17 to 3–8 victory gave Crowley a second All-Ireland medal.

Cork secured the provincial title again in 1978 following a narrow 0–13 to 0–11 defeat of Clare, with Crowley picking up a third Munster medal. Kilkenny provided the opposition in the subsequent All-Ireland decider on 3 September 1978. Cork secured a first three-in-a-row of All-Ireland titles for the first time in over twenty years, as a Jimmy Barry-Murphy goal helped the team to a 1–15 to 2–8 victory over Kilkenny. It was Crowley's third successive All-Ireland medal.

In 1979 Cork were invincible in the provincial championship once again. A 2–15 to 0–9 trouncing of Limerick gave the county a record-equalling fifth consecutive provincial title, with Crowley collecting his fourth Munster medal.

Crowley won his sole National Hurling League medal in 1980 following a 4–15 to 4–6 defeat of Limerick in a replay of the final.

After a trophy-less season for Crowley in 1981, Cork returned to their winning ways the following year. A massive 5–31 to 3–6 defeat of Waterford gave Crowley his fifth Munster medal. Cork subsequently faced rank outsiders Kilkenny in the All-Ireland final on 5 September 1982. The opening eighteen minutes were frantic, however, a Noel Skehan save from a Seánie O'Leary shot inspired Kilkenny. A brace of goals from Christy Heffernan in two minutes just before the break gave the Cats a commanding 2–11 to 0–7 lead. Cork rallied after the restart, however, Skehan was the hero for Kilkenny as they powered to a 3–18 to 1–13 victory.

Crowley secured a sixth Munster medal in 1983 following a 3–22 to 0–12 rout of Waterford once again. The All-Ireland final on 4 September 1983 was a repeat of the previous year with Kilkenny providing the opposition once again. The Cats built up a healthy interval advantage of six points. Shortly after the restart the Noresiders advantage was nine points, however, they failed to score for the last seventeen minutes of the game. Cork rallied with goals from Tomás Mulcahy and Seánie O'Leary but were ultimately defeated by 2–14 to 2–12.

Cork were the dominant force in Munster once again in 1984, with Crowley winning a seventh Munster medal following a memorable 4–15 to 3–14 defeat of Tipperary in the provincial showpiece. The subsequent All-Ireland final on 2 September 1984, played at Semple Stadium in Thurles, saw Cork take on Offaly for the first time ever in championship history. The centenary-year final failed to live up to expectations and Cork recorded a relatively easy 3–16 to 1–12 victory. It was Crowley's fourth All-Ireland medal, while he was also named man of the match. He was later honoured with his sole All-Star award.

In 1985 Crowley added an eighth Munster title to his collection as Cork defeated Tipperary by 4–17 to 4–11 in the provincial decider once again.

Cork made it five-in-a-row in Munster in 1986 as they defeated Clare by 2–18 to 3–12 to take the provincial title. It was Crowley's ninth Munster medal. This victory paved the way for an All-Ireland final meeting with Galway on 7 September 1986. The men from the west were the red-hot favourites against a Cork team in decline, however, on the day a different story unfolded. Four Cork goals, one from John Fenton, two from Tomás Mulcahy and one from Kevin Hennessy, stymied the Galway attack and helped the Rebels to a 4–13 to 2–15 victory. It was Crowley's fifth and final All-Ireland medal.

In 1987 Cork's hopes of winning a record-breaking sixth successive Munster crown were dashed when Tipperary beat Cork by 4–22 to 1–22 in a replay of the provincial decider. Crowley retired from inter-county hurling following this defeat.

=== Inter-provincial ===
Crowley was also chosen for duty with the Munster inter-provincial team on one occasion.

== Managerial career ==
=== Cork ===
In late 1995 Jimmy Barry-Murphy was appointed manager of the Cork senior hurling team. The appointment of Crowley and Tom Cashman as selectors led to the managerial team being referred to as the 'dream team.' This tag stuck, however, Cork's fortunes remained in the doldrums. A humiliating defeat by Limerick at home in Páirc Uí Chaoimh in 1996 was followed by a defeat by Clare in 1997.

In 1998, the defeats of the previous two seasons put the management team under pressure to deliver. A successful National League campaign saw Cork reach the final of that competition and defeat Waterford. This success meant that the team went into the championship with great expectations, however, the Munster semi-final saw Clare defeat Cork on a score line of 0–21 to 0–14. For the sixth year in-a-row Cork had failed to make it to the All-Ireland series.

1999 was a make-or-break year for Barry-Murphy, Crowley and Cashman. The manager and selectors introduced a host of new players and one of the youngest Cork teams ever took to the field in the championship. The Munster final saw Cork take on Clare, a team that had defeated them at the semifinal stage in 1997 and 1998. Clare entered the game as the red-hot favourites and as possible All-Ireland contenders, however, a younger Cork team finally triumphed and Cork claimed their first Munster title since 1992. Cork defeated reigning All-Ireland champions Offaly by three points in the All-Ireland semi-final before reaching the championship decider with Kilkenny. The game, played in atrocious conditions, proved to be an anti-climax. Cork were victorious by a single point, 0–13 to 0–12, and the managerial trio had finally led their county back to the All-Ireland title.

In 2000 Cork retained their Munster title after defeating Tipperary. Once again, the experts predicted a Cork-Kilkenny final, however, Offaly were waiting in the All-Ireland semi-final and duly defeated Cork. This was Crowley's last game as a selector as the managerial team disbanded shortly afterwards.

=== Bishopstown ===
Following his period as an inter-county selector, Crowley returned to club activity and served as manager of the Bishopstown senior hurling team for a while in the early 2000s.

== Honours ==
=== Team ===
St Finbarr's College

- Dr Croke Cup: 1974
- Harty Cup: 1973, 1974 (c)

Bishopstown

- City Junior A Hurling Championship (1): 1977

Cork

- All-Ireland Senior Hurling Championship (5): 1976, 1977, 1978, 1984, 1986
- Munster Senior Hurling Championship (9): 1976, 1977, 1978, 1979, 1982, 1983, 1984, 1985, 1986
- National Hurling League (1): 1979–80
- All-Ireland Under-21 Hurling Championship (1): 1976
- Munster Under-21 Hurling Championship (1): 1975, 1976, 1977
- All-Ireland Minor Hurling Championship (1): 1974
- Munster Minor Hurling Championship (1): 1974
- All-Ireland Minor Football Championship (1): 1974
- Munster Minor Football Championship (1): 1974

=== Individual ===
Awards

- All-Star (1): 1984
- All-Ireland final man of the match (1): 1984

=== Selector ===
Cork

- All-Ireland Senior Hurling Championship (1): 1999
- Munster Senior Hurling Championship (3): 1999, 2000, 2014
- National Hurling League (1): 1998
