= Joe Hennessy =

Irish hurler (born 1956)

Personal information
- Native name: Seosamh Ó hAonasa (Irish)
- Born: 17 January 1956 (age 70) Kilkenny, Ireland
- Occupation: Fuel merchant
- Height: 5 ft 11 in (180 cm)

Sport
- Sport: Hurling
- Position: Half-back
Club
- Years: Club
- 1974-1992: James Stephens
Club titles
- Kilkenny titles: 3
- Leinster titles: 2
- All-Ireland Titles: 2
Inter-county*
Years	County	Apps (scores)
1976-1988	Kilkenny	32 (1-14)
Inter-county titles
- Leinster titles: 6
- All-Irelands: 3
- NHL: 2
- All Stars: 5
- *Inter County team apps and scores correct as of 14:27, 31 May 2015.

Joseph Patrick Hennessy (born 17 January 1956) is an Irish retired hurler who played as a right wing-back for the Kilkenny senior team.

Born in Kilkenny, Hennessy first played competitive hurling during his schooling at CBS Kilkenny. He arrived on the inter-county scene at the age of seventeen when he first linked up with the Kilkenny minor team before later joining the under-21 side. He made his senior debut during the 1976 championship. Hennessy immediately became a regular member of the team and won three All-Ireland medals, six Leinster medals and two National Hurling League medals. He was an All-Ireland runner-up on two occasions.

As a member of the Leinster inter-provincial team on a number of occasions Hennessy won one Railway Cup medal. At club level he is a two-time All-Ireland medallist with James Stephens. In addition to this Hennessy has also won two Leinster medals and three championship medals.

His father, Paddy Hennessy, also played with Kilkenny.

Throughout his career Hennessy made 32 championship appearances. His retirement came following the conclusion of the 1987-88 league.

Hennessy is widely regarded as one of the greatest hurlers of all time. During his playing days he won five All-Star awards. He has been repeatedly voted onto teams made up of the sport's greats, including at right wing-back on the Kilkenny Hurling Team of the Century and the Club Hurling Silver Jubilee Team. Hennessy was also chosen as one of the 125 greatest hurlers of all time in a 2009 poll.

== Playing career ==
=== Club ===
Hennessy first played for the James Stephens senior team in 1974 and was a regular member of the starting fifteen the following year when the club made a breakthrough. A 1–14 to 1–5 defeat of first-time finalists Galmoy gave Hennessy a championship medal. James Stephens subsequently qualified for the provincial decider, with Offaly champions St. Rynagh's providing the opposition. James Stephens took the lead from the third minute, with Liam "Chunky" O'Brien being scorer-in-chief. A 1–14 to 2–4 victory gave Hennessy his first Leinster medal. Two-time champions and hot favourites Blackrock provided the opposition in the subsequent All-Ireland decider. "The Rockies" got off to the better start, with two goals by Éamonn O'Donoghue and Pat Moylan giving them a 2–1 lead at the quarter mark. James Stephens trailed at the interval but were transformed in the second half. A 2–10 to 2–4 victory gave Hennessy his first All-Ireland medal.

Hennessy collected a second consecutive championship medal in 1976 as Rower-Inistioge were accounted for by 2–14 to 0–13.

After a period of decline, James Stephens bounced back in 1981. A double scores 2–10 to 0–8 defeat of Fenians gave Hennessy a third championship medal. He later collected a second Leinster medal as championship debutantes Faythe Harriers were narrowly defeated by 0–13 to 1–9. First time finalists Mount Sion of Waterford provided the opposition in the subsequent All-Ireland decider. A hat-trick of goals by John McCormack, together with a ten-point haul from Billy Walton, saw James Stephens fight back from seven points down to record a 3–13 to 3–8 victory. It was a second All-Ireland medal for Hennessy .

=== Minor and under-21 ===
Hennessy first played for Kilkenny as a member of the minor team in 1973. A 3–10 to 2–9 defeat of Wexford secured a third successive provincial title for the team and a first Leinster medal for Hennessy. On 2 September 1973 Kilkenny faced Galway in the subsequent All-Ireland decider. The game was a close, exciting affair played on a wet day, however, at the full-time whistle Kilkenny were the champions by 4–5 to 3–7. The victory gave Hennessy an All-Ireland Minor Hurling Championship medal.

Kilkenny retained their provincial dominance in 1974 with Hennessy collecting a second Leinster medal following an 8–19 to 3-5 trouncing of Dublin. The subsequent All-Ireland decider on 1 September 1974 saw Cork providing the opposition. In a low-scoring game Hennessy's side were defeated by 1–10 to 1–8.

By 1975 Hennessy had joined the Kilkenny under-21 team. He won his first Leinster medal that year as Kilkenny accounted for Wexford by 3–14 to 0–8. The subsequent All-Ireland final against Cork was rated the best hurling game of the year. Kilkenny 'keeper Kevin Fennelly brought off two brilliant saves from Con Brassil and Finbarr Delaney in the closing stages to secure a 5–13 to 2–19 victory.

Kilkenny retained the provincial title in 1976 with Hennessy collecting a second Leinster medal following a 3–21 to 0-5 trouncing of Wexford once again. The subsequent All-Ireland final was a replay of the previous year with Cork providing the opposition once again. The Rebels made no mistake on this occasion and secured a 2–17 to 1–8 victory.

Hennessy won a third successive Leinster medal in 1977 as Wexford were downed once again on a score line of 3–11 to 1–10. Cork were once again waiting for Kilkenny in the All-Ireland decider. Having been beating the previous year, the Cats made no mistake on this occasion and secured a narrow 2–9 to 1–9 victory. It was Hennessy's second All-Ireland medal.

=== Senior ===
In 1978 Kilkenny broke Wexford's stranglehold on Leinster and secured the provincial title with a narrow 2–16 to 1–16 victory. It was Hennessy's first Leinster medal at the highest level. On 3 September 1978 Kilkenny faced Cork in the All-Ireland decider, as the Rebels were bidding to become the first team in over twenty years to secure a third championship in succession. The game was far from the classic that was expected, with the decisive score coming from Jimmy Barry-Murphy whose low shot towards goal deceived Noel Skehan and trickled over the line. The 1–15 to 2–8 score line resulted in defeat for Hennessy's side. In spite of this he was later honoured with his first All-Star.

Hennessy won a second successive Leinster medal in 1979 as Wexford were defeated by 2–21 to 2–17. On 2 September 1979 Kilkenny faced Galway in the All-Ireland final. Bad weather and an unofficial train drivers' strike resulted in the lowest attendance at a final in over twenty years. The bad weather also affected the hurling with Kilkenny scoring two freak goals as Galway 'keeper Séamus Shinnors had a nightmare of a game. A Liam "Chunky" O’Brien 70-yard free went all the way to the net in the first half, while with just three minutes remaining a 45-yard shot from Mick Brennan was helped by the wind and dipped under the crossbar. Kilkenny won by 2–12 to 1–8 with Hennessy winning his first All-Ireland medal. He later collected a second All-Star.

After a fallow two-year period, Kilkenny bounced back in 1982 with Hennessy winning his first National Hurling League medal following a 2–14 to 1–11 defeat of Wexford. He later added a third Leinster medal to his collection following a 1–11 to 0–12 defeat of three-in-a-row hopefuls and reigning All-Ireland champions Offaly. On 5 September 1982 Kilkenny and Cork renewed their rivalry in the All-Ireland decider. The Cats were rank outsiders on the day, however, a brilliant save by Noel Skehan was followed by two quick goals by Christy Heffernan just before the interval. Éamonn O'Donoghue pegged a goal back for Cork, however, Ger Fennelly added a third for Kilkenny who secured a 3–18 to 1–13 victory. It was a second All-Ireland medal for Hennessy.

Hennessy won a fourth Leinster medal in 1983 as Offaly were accounted for by 1–17 to 0–13. The All-Ireland final on 4 September 1983 was a replay of the previous year with Cork hoping to avenge that defeat. Billy Fitzpatrick was the star with ten points, giving Kilkenny a 2–14 to 1–9 lead with seventeen minutes left, however, they failed to score for the remainder of the game. A stunning comeback by Cork just fell short and Hennessy collected a third All-Ireland medal following a 2–14 to 2–12 victory. This was followed by a third All-Star]

Three-in-a-row proved beyond Kilkenny in 1984, however, Hennessy's performance earned him a fourth All-Star.

In 1986 the team bounced back with Hennessy collecting a second league medal following a 2–10 to 2–6 defeat of Galway. He later collected a fifth Leinster medal following a 4–10 to 1–11 defeat of reigning champions Offaly.

Hennessy won a sixth and final Leinster medal in 1987 as Offaly were downed once again by 2–14 to 0–17. On 6 September 1987 Galway, a team who were hoping to avoid becoming the first team to lose three finals in-a-row, faced a Kilkenny team who for many of its players knew it would be their last chance to claim an All-Ireland medal. Galway 'keeper John Commins saved two goal chances from Ger Fennelly, while at the other end substitute Noel Lane bagged a decisive goal as Galway claimed a 1–12 to 0–9 victory. Hennessy ended the year by winning a fifth All-Star.

=== Inter-provincial ===
Hennessy also lined out with Leinster in the inter-provincial championship, however, his career coincided with a low ebb for Leinster hurling at this level. His sole triumph came in 1979, when a 1–13 to 1–9 defeat of Connacht in the decider gave him a Railway Cup medal.

== Honours ==
=== Player ===
James Stephens

- All-Ireland Senior Club Hurling Championship (2): 1976, 1982
- Leinster Senior Club Hurling Championship (2): 1975, 1981
- Kilkenny Senior Club Hurling Championship (3): 1975, 1976, 1981

Kilkenny

- All-Ireland Senior Hurling Championship (3): 1979, 1982, 1983
- Leinster Senior Hurling Championship (6): 1978, 1979, 1982, 1983, 1986, 1987
- National Hurling League (4): 1975–76 (sub), 1981–82, 1982–83 (sub), 1985–86
- All-Ireland Under-21 Hurling Championship (2): 1975, 1977
- Leinster Under-21 Hurling Championship (3): 1975, 1976, 1977
- All-Ireland Minor Hurling Championship (1): 1973
- Leinster Minor Hurling Championship (2): 1973, 1974

Leinster

- Railway Cup (1): 1979

=== Individual ===
Honours

- The 125 greatest stars of the GAA: No. 60
- All-Ireland Club Hurling Silver Jubilee Team: Right wing-back
- All-Star (5): 1978, 1979, 1983, 1984, 1987
