= 1978 All-Ireland Senior Hurling Championship final =

1978 All-Ireland Senior Hurling Final
- Event: 1978 All-Ireland Senior Hurling Championship
Cork	Kilkenny
1-15	2-8
- Date: 3 September 1978
- Venue: Croke Park, Dublin
- Referee: Jimmy Rankin (Laois)
- Attendance: 64,155

The 1978 All-Ireland Senior Hurling Championship Final was the 91st All-Ireland Final and the culmination of the 1978 All-Ireland Senior Hurling Championship, an inter-county hurling tournament for the top teams in Ireland. The match was held at Croke Park, Dublin, on 3 September 1978, between Cork and Kilkenny. The Munster opponents defeated the defending Leinster champions on a score line of 1-15 to 2-8.

== All-Ireland final ==
=== Overview ===
In the early days of 1978 Cork's hurling followers wondered if the county senior team would complete the holy grail of capturing three consecutive All-Ireland wins in-a-row. A poor showing in the National Hurling League discouraged the followers; however, the side comfortably won the Munster Championship and qualified for a third consecutive All-Ireland final appearance. Cork had defeated Wexford in the two previous championship deciders, however, to defeat their old rivals Kilkenny to capture the third in-a-row would prove the worth of this team. It was the first championship meeting of these two teams since Kilkenny defeated Cork in the All-Ireland final of 1972.

=== Match report ===
Sunday 3 September was the date of the All-Ireland final and conditions were almost excellent with sunshine in the early stages of the game. Roy Jenkins, the President of the European Commission, was a special guest at the game and he sat beside Jack Lynch, a former Cork player and one of the all-time greats of the game who was now Taoiseach.

The game began at a lightning pace with Jimmy Barry-Murphy grabbing the sliothar on the wing after the throw-in. His shot went straight over the bar to put Cork on the scoreboard after just twenty-five seconds of play. Immediately after the puck-out the play switched to the Cork goalmouth, however, a Frank Cummins shot went wide. Back at the other end of the field after the puck-out team captain Charlie McCarthy did likewise for Cork when his first shot of the day went wide. Soon after this the ball broke to Ray Cummins down on the wing on the Hogan Stand side and he was completely unmarked. His shot was not a good one and was pulled down by Kilkenny goalkeeper Noel Skehan and was promptly cleared. What could have been another Cork score quickly turned into a Kilkenny attack. As the sliothar was sent into the Cork goalmouth two of the team’s defenders collided as it dropped to Liam ‘Chunky’ O’Brien. O’Brien flicked it onto Kevin Fennelly who had an easy tap into the net to capture Kilkenny’s first score of the afternoon. Almost immediately Brian Cody had the opportunity to his side three points up, however, his shot went wide. Cork’s ultra accurate free-taker, John Horgan, did likewise for his team soon afterwards when his long-range free tailed wide. After another intensive tussle around midfield the ball broke to Ray Cummins once again and he took off on a solo run in the direction of Kilkenny’s goal. As he edged nearer he was pulled down and a penalty was awarded. Tim Crowley stepped up to take the penalty and had every intention of going for a goal. His shot was a good one, however, it was stopped by Noel Skehan who cleared his lines and gave his defenders some respite. The next score of the day came for Cork when 21-year-old Tom Cashman pointed for his team.

Shortly after the puck-out Cork were awarded a free in their own half. John Horgan stepped up to take the free and, while his effort was a good one, the sliothar hit Kilkenny’s upright and came back into play to an unsuspecting Charlie McCarthy. The sliothar eventually broke to Gerald McCarthy who slotted over Cork’s third point to level the sides for the first time. Kilkenny’s response was not an effective one as Billy Fitzpatrick and Mick Brennan sent over two wides in close succession. At the other end of the field Tim Crowley was more accurate for Cork when he pointed to give his side the narrowest of leads. Both sides exchanged wides soon afterwards while John Horgan’s nightmare continued as another one of his frees went wide. A Mick Brennan point for Kilkenny leveled the sides once again; however, this was quickly cancelled out by a Seánie O'Leary effort at the canal end of the pitch. On the stroke of twenty minutes ‘Chunky’ O’Brien sent over a free to restore parity on the scoreboard once again. This period of level scores was soon over when Charlie McCarthy sent over another free to give Cork the narrowest of leads once again. The puck-out broke around the midfield area to Jimmy Barry-Murphy who failed to raise the sliothar onto his hurley but passed it along the ground to Seánie O’Leary. He too was unable to control the sliothar and went crashing out over the sideline into a photographer and ended up under a Coca-Cola advertisement in front of the canal end terrace. Not long after this incident John Horgan failed to increase the lead when he sent his third free of the day wide before Billy Fitzpatrick restored level scores again with another point for ‘the Cats’. After play resumed Jimmy Barry-Murphy failed to capture his second point of the day when his shot also failed to hit the target while a Ray Cummins shot was also batted out as he was yet to make an impact on the game. Kilkenny took the lead for the second time shortly after these two misses when ‘Chunky’ O’Brien captured his second point of the day. Mick Brennan failed to extend this lead when his effort went wide. With three minutes left before the interval Charlie McCarthy scored his second point of the day to level the scores once again. This was the last score of the half and both sides were level at half-time - Cork 0-7, Kilkenny 1-4.

Mick Brennan gave Kilkenny the lead again immediately after the restart when he captured another point for Kilkenny. Cork, however, fought back and quickly restored their lead courtesy of two converted frees by Charlie McCarthy. Ray Cummins continued to have a dismal afternoon when his shot on goal was saved again by Noel Skehan and cleared immediately. Kevin Fennelly was equally unlucky when his attempt at a point hit the upright and was cleared. Richie Reid subsequently failed to draw the teams level when his effort also went wide. Joe Hennessy got his name on the score sheet soon afterwards when his ‘65’ went straight over the bar. ‘Chunky’ O’Brien gave Kilkenny a one-point lead once again, however, Cork quickly embarked on their most impressive passage of play since the game began. A Charlie McCarthy free from an awkward angle gave Cork a lift and sent the players on a scoring spree. Tim Crowley, who was enjoying a great battle with Frank Cummins at midfield, gradually wore down the dominance of his opponent. He grabbed the sliothar straight after the puck-out, broke away down the Cusack Stand side wing on a strong solo run and shot over a spectacular point to lift his team even more. Kilkenny’s response came in the form of a shot from Brian Cody, however, this went wide. Charlie McCarthy stretched Cork’s lead to two points after fifty-five minutes of play after he converted a free. Gerald McCarthy chipped in with another point to give Cork more confidence and a solid lead for the first time in the game.

‘Chunky’ O’Brien converted another free to claw one back for ‘the Cats’ before he was taken off and replaced by Pat Henderson. The game tightened up once again and the scores were slower in coming. With about thirteen minutes left to play in the game the ball broke to Jimmy Barry-Murphy just to the left of the Kilkenny goalpost. He sent in a low shot that bobbled along the ground and somehow found its way into the Kilkenny net. The significance of this goal was summed up by RTÉ commentator Michael O'Hehir who declared ‘...and Jimmy Barry-Murphy, the scorer of the goal that could win an All-Ireland.’ This gave Cork a five-point lead; however, this was eaten into immediately when Billy Fitzpatrick responded with a goal of his own. With Cork leading by 1-13 to 2-8 the destination of the Liam MacCarthy Cup still hung in the balance. Charlie McCarthy failed to extend Cork’s lead after the puck-out as his effort went wide. With time running out Kilkenny were awarded a line ball in the corner of the Hogan and Nally Stands. Ray Cummins, who was having an off day by his standards, blocked the sliothar and nonchalantly sent it over the bar to restore Cork’s three-point lead. The dying minutes of the game saw both sides shoot over wides, two for Cork and one for Kilkenny. The final score of the day, and indeed the final score of the championship, went to Cork’s captain Charlie McCarthy who slotted over a neat point. The referee blew the full-time whistle immediately after the puck-out and Cork had won the game by 1-15 to 2-8.

As Charlie McCarthy climbed the steps of the Hogan Stand to receive the Liam MacCarthy Cup there was a large Cork contingent there to meet him. The Secretary-General of the Gaelic Athletic Association, Seán Ó Síocháin, hailed from Cork and was the first to greet McCarthy on the rostrum. Jack Lynch, one of the all-time greats of hurling and the Taoiseach at the time, was the next person to extend his congratulations to the winning captain. Finally, Con Murphy, the President of the GAA, was also a native of Cork and a former player. He presented the cup to a Cork captain for the third year in-a-row.

=== Statistics ===
1978-09-03
15:30 BST

Cork	1-15 – 2-8	Kilkenny
C. McCarthy (0-7); J. Barry-Murphy (1-1); G. McCarthy (0-2); T. Crowley (0-2); T. Cashman (0-1); S. O'Leary (0-1); R. Cummins (0-1)		B. Fitzpatrick (1-1); L. O’Brien (0-4); K. Fennelly (1-0); M. Brennan (0-2); J. Hennessy (0-1)

Croke Park, Dublin
Attendance: 64,155
Referee: Jimmy Rankin (Laois)

CORK:
GK	1	Martin Coleman
RCB	2	Brian Murphy
FB	3	Martin O'Doherty
LCB	4	John Horgan
RWB	5	Dermot Mac Curtain
CB	6	Johnny Crowley
LWB	7	Denis Coughlan
M	8	Tom Cashman
M	9	Pat Moylan
RWF	10	Jimmy Barry-Murphy
CF	11	Gerald McCarthy
LWF	12	Tim Crowley
RCF	13	Charlie McCarthy (c)
FF	14	Ray Cummins
LCF	15	Seánie O'Leary
Substitutes:
M		John Allen
LCF		Éamonn O'Donoghue

KILKENNY:
GK	1	Noel Skehan
RCB	2	Paddy Prendergast
FB	3	Phil ‘Fan’ Larkin
LCB	4	Dick O'Hara
RWB	5	Joe Hennessy
CB	6	Ger Henderson (c)
LWB	7	Richie Reid
M	8	Frank Cummins
M	9	Liam ‘Chunky’ O’Brien
RWF	10	Kevin Fennelly
CF	11	Mick Crotty
LWF	12	Billy Fitzpatrick
RCF	13	Mick 'Cloney' Brennan
FF	14	Brian Cody
LCF	15	Matt Ruth
Substitutes:
RWF		Tommy Malone
CB		Pat Henderson

MATCH RULES

- 70 minutes.
- Replay if scores level.
- Three named substitutes

Cork Substitutes John Allen for Tom Cashman Eamonn O'Donoghue for Seanie O'Leary Unused Substitutes Jerry Cronin, Denis Burns, Pat Horgan, John Fenton Coach Fr Bertie Troy Trainer Kevin Kehilly Selectors Frank Murphy, Jimmy Brohan, Christy Ring, Denis Murphy, Tadgh Mullane
