= Tom Cashman =

Irish retired hurler, coach and selector

Personal information
- Native name: Tomás Ó Cíosáin (Irish)
- Born: 28 August 1957 (age 69) Blackrock, County Cork, Ireland
- Occupation: Sales rep
- Height: 5 ft 8 in (173 cm)

Sport
- Sport: Hurling
- Position: Left wing-back
Club
- Years: Club
- 1974–1991: Blackrock
Club titles
- Cork titles: 4
- Munster titles: 3
- All-Ireland Titles: 2
Inter-county*
Years	County	Apps (scores)
1976–1989	Cork	36 (2–29)
Inter-county titles
- Munster titles: 8
- All-Irelands: 4
- NHL: 2
- All Stars: 3
- *Inter County team apps and scores correct as of 17:25, 6 December 2013.

Tom Cashman (born 28 August 1957) is an Irish former hurler, coach and selector who played for Cork Senior Championship club Blackrock. He played for the Cork senior hurling team for 12 years. Equally comfortable as a half-back or at midfield, Cashman is regarded as one of the greatest players of all time.

Cashman began his hurling career at club level with Blackrock. He broke onto the club's top adult team as a 16-year-old in 1974 and enjoyed his greatest success at midfield on the All-Ireland Club Championship-winning team in 1979. Cashman's club career ended in 1990, by which time he had also won three Munster Club Championship titles and four Cork Senior Championship titles.

At inter-county level, Cashman was part of the successful Cork minor teams that won dual All-Ireland Championships in 1974 before later winning an All-Ireland Championship with the under-21 team in 1976. He joined the Cork senior team in 1976. From his debut, Cashman was ever-present either at midfield or in the half-back line and made 36 Championship appearances in a career that ended with his last game in 1988. During that time he was part of four All-Ireland Championship-winning teams – in 1977, 1978, 1984 and as captain in 1986. Cashman also secured eight Munster Championship medals and two National Hurling League medals. He announced his retirement from inter-county hurling in January 1989.

Cashman won his first All-Star in 1977, before claiming a further two All-Stars in 1978, 1983. He was later selected on the Cork Hurling Teams of the Century and Millennium. At inter-provincial level, Cashman was selected to play in seven championship campaigns with Munster, with Railway Cup titles being secured in 1978, 1981 and 1985.

In retirement from playing Cashman became involved in team management and coaching. He was an All-Ireland-winning coach and selector with Cork in both the minor and senior grades. He briefly served as manager of the Cork senior hurling team.

== Early life ==
Born and raised in Blackrock, Cashman is the son of Mick Cashman and the former Anne Brohan. His father was a long-serving goalkeeper with Blackrock and was part of the Cork team that won three All-Ireland titles in-a-row in the 1950s. Cashman' uncle, Jimmy Brohan, also lined out for the Blackrock club and at inter-county level with Cork, while two other uncles, Bobby and John Brohan, played soccer with Cork city-based clubs Evergreen United and Cork Hibernians respectively.

An aunt, Maureen Cashman, played camogie with Cork. Cashman's brother, Jim, was a contemporary with Blackrock and Cork in the 1980s. His nephews, John and Niall Cashman and Alan Connolly, have also all lined out for Blackrock and Cork.

Cashman first played hurling as a schoolboy at the North Monastery. He was just 14-years-old when he joined the senior team as goalkeeper, and he lined out in several Harty Cup campaigns without success.

== Club career ==
Cashman began his club career as a hurler at juvenile and underage levels with the Blackrock club, while he also lined out as a Gaelic footballer with sister club St. Michael's. He was in goal when Blackrock beat Eoghan Ruadh to win the inaugural Féile na nGael tournament in 1971. Cashman progressed through the various grades, eventually becoming an outfield player, and claimed a double of minor titles when Blackrock and St. Michael's beat St. Brogan's in the respective minor finals. He later won consecutive Cork U21HC titles in 1976 and 1977, while also claiming another underage double when St. Michael's also claimed the Cork U21FC title in 1976.

By that stage Cashman had already joined the club's senior team after making his debut as a 16-year-old in May 1974. He lined out in all four championship games that year, including the final when Blackrock were beaten by St. Finbarr's. Cashman was again a regular championship starter the following year and was at right wing-forward for the victory over Glen Rovers in the 1975 final. He overcame a long-term leg injury to line out in Blackrock's successful Munster Club Championship campaign before losing the 1976 All-Ireland club final to James Stephens. Cashman was also a member of the St. Michael's football team that lost three consecutive Cork SFC finals in 1976, 1977 and 1978.

After losing the 1976 final to Glen Rovers, Cashman collected a second winners' medal when Blackrock overcame the Glen in 1978. He ended the season with an All-Ireland Club Championship title after Blackrock beat Ballyhale Shamrocks in the 1979 All-Ireland club final. Blackrock retained the Cork SHC title after a win over St. Finbarr's in the 1979 final, with Cashman claiming his third winners' medal. After losing the 1982 final to St. Finbarr's, he won his fourth and final Cork SHC title after a win over Midleton in 1985. Cashman brought an end to his club career when he announced his retirement on 15 May 1991.

== Inter-county career ==
Cashman began his inter-county career as a dual player at minor level in 1974 and ended the season with two All-Ireland medals as Cork completed the double following defeats of Kilkenny and Mayo respectively. He was again included on the minor football team for their unsuccessful 1975 season, before ending his minor hurling team tenure as captain in a defeat by Kilkenny in the 1975 All-Ireland minor final. Cashman's progression onto the Cork under-21 hurling team was immediate and he was at centre-back when the team beat Kilkenny by 12 points in the 1976 All-Ireland under-21 final. He claimed a second successive Munster U21HC medal the following year but ended the season with a defeat by Kilkenny in the 1977 All-Ireland under-21 final. Cashman's third and final year in the under-21 grade in 1978 also saw him drafted onto the Cork under-21 football team.

Cashman joined the Cork senior hurling team for the early rounds of the 1976-77 National League and played in all of the team's championship matches which culminated with a defeat of Wexford in the 1977 All-Ireland final. He ended his debut season by becoming the then youngest-ever All-Star recipient. After securing a second successive Munster SHC title after a two-point win over Clare, Cashman later captured a second successive All-Ireland medal after Cork's defeat of Kilkenny in the 1978 All-Ireland final. A second successive All-Star also followed. Cork's 1979 season ended with an All-Ireland semi-final defeat by Galway, however, Cashman had earlier claimed a third successive Munster SHC title.

Cashman added to his honours when Cork won the 1979-80 National League title before claiming a second league winners' medal in 1981. He brought his Munster SHC medal tally to five with consecutive defeats of Waterford in 1982 and 1983, however, Cork suffered consecutive All-Ireland final defeats by Kilkenny. In spite of this, he collected a third All-Star award in 1983. Cashman won a sixth Munster SHC medal overall after Cork completed a three-in-a-row with a defeat of Tipperary in the 1984 Munster final. Cashman ended the season with a third All-Ireland medal after lining out at right wing-back in the defeat of Offaly in the 1984 All-Ireland final. He also became the only current player to be named on Cork's Hurling Team of the Century that year.

Cashman won a seventh Munster SHC title in 1985 before being named team captain the following year and bringing his overall tally to eight winners' medals after defeat of Clare in the 1986 Munster final. He later lifted the Liam MacCarthy Cup after Cork's 4–13 to 2–15 defeat of Galway in the 1986 All-Ireland final. Cashman's last game for Cork was a defeat by Tipperary in the 1988 Munster final replay. He announced his retirement from inter-county hurling on 24 January 1989.

== Inter-provincial career ==
Cashman's performances at inter-county level resulted in his selection for the Munster team on seven occasions between 1978 and 1985. His debut game was a winning one with Munster beating Connacht in the 1978 Railway Cup final Cashman claimed a further two winners' medals after defeats of Leinster in 1981 and Connacht in 1985.

== Coaching career ==
In October 1993, Cashman was appointed joint-coach of the Cork minor hurling team alongside Jimmy Barry-Murphy. Their first season in charge saw Cork secure the Munster MHC title before losing the 1994 All-Ireland minor final to Galway. Cashman and Barry-Murphy were retained in their coaching roles and, after securing a second successive Munster title, guided Cork to a 2–10 to 1–02 defeat of Kilkenny in the 1995 All-Ireland minor final.

This success resulted in Barry-Murphy immediately taking over as Cork senior team manager, with Cashman joining him in the role of selector. After claiming the National League title in 1998, Cork went on to beat Kilkenny in the 1999 All-Ireland final. Cashman's five years as a senior selector also included consecutive Munster SHC titles in 1999 and 2000.

After Barry-Murphy stepped down as manager, Cashman was appointed to the role in November 2000. His one season in charge saw Cork fail in their bid to secure a third successive Munster title after narrowly losing to Limerick in their first and only championship game of the year. Tom Cashman resigned as Cork senior hurling team manager shortly afterwards.

== Honours ==
=== Team ===
Blackrock

- All-Ireland Senior Club Hurling Championship: 1979
- Munster Senior Club Hurling Championship: 1975, 1978, 1979
- Cork Senior Hurling Championship: 1975, 1978, 1979, 1985
- Cork Under-21 Hurling Championship: 1976, 1977
- Cork Minor Hurling Championship: 1974
- Féile na nGael: 1971

Cork

- All-Ireland Senior Hurling Championship: 1977, 1978, 1984, 1986 (c)
- Munster Senior Hurling Championship: 1977, 1978, 1979, 1982, 1983, 1984, 1985, 1986 (c)
- National Hurling League: 1979-80, 1980-81
- All-Ireland Under-21 Hurling Championship: 1976
- Munster Under-21 Hurling Championship: 1975, 1976, 1977
- All-Ireland Minor Football Championship: 1974
- Munster Minor Football Championship: 1974
- All-Ireland Minor Hurling Championship: 1974
- Munster Minor Hurling Championship: 1974, 1975

Munster

- Railway Cup: 1978, 1981, 1985

=== Selector ===
Cork

- All-Ireland Senior Hurling Championship: 1999
- Munster Senior Hurling Championship: 1999, 2000
- National Hurling League: 1998
- All-Ireland Minor Hurling Championship: 1995
- Munster Minor Hurling Championship: 1994, 1995

Sporting positions
Preceded by	Cork Minor Hurling Captain; 1975	Succeeded by
Preceded by Ger Cunningham	Cork Senior Hurling Captain; 1986	Succeeded by Kevin Hennessy
Preceded by Jimmy Barry-Murphy	Cork Senior Hurling Manager; 2000–2001	Succeeded by Bertie Óg Murphy
Achievements
Preceded by Pat Fleury	All-Ireland SHC winning captain 1986	Succeeded by Conor Hayes
