= Richie Reid =

Irish hurler

Personal information
- Native name: Risteard Ó Maoildeirg (Irish)
- Born: 1956 (age 69–70) Ballyhale, County Kilkenny, Ireland

Sport
- Sport: Hurling
- Position: Right wing-back
Club
- Years: Club
- Ballyhale Shamrocks
Club titles
- Kilkenny titles: 2
- Leinster titles: 1
- All-Ireland Titles: 1
Inter-county*
Years	County	Apps (scores)
1978-1981 1988-1989	Kilkenny; Dublin	10 (0-00); 1 (0-00)
Inter-county titles
- Leinster titles: 2
- All-Irelands: 1
- NHL: 0
- All Stars: 0
- *Inter County team apps and scores correct as of 17:24, 20 June 2015.

Richard "Richie" Reid (born 1956) is an Irish retired hurler who played as a wing-back for the Kilkenny and Dublin senior teams.

Born in Ballyhale, County Kilkenny, Reid first arrived on the inter-county scene at the age of nineteen when he first linked up with the Kilkenny under-21 team. He made his senior debut during the 1978 championship. Reid immediately became a regular member of the starting fifteen and won one All-Ireland medal and two Leinster medals. He was an All-Ireland runner-up on one occasion.

At club level Reid is a one-time All-Ireland medallist with Ballyhale Shamrocks. In addition to this he has also won one Leinster medal and two championship medals. With Faughs Reid won two championship medals.

His nephew, T. J. Reid, is a seven time All-Ireland medallist with Kilkenny.

Throughout his career Reid made 11 championship appearances. His retirement came following the conclusion of the 1989 championship.

== Playing career ==
=== Club ===
In 1979 Reid enjoyed his first success with the Ballyhale Shamrocks senior team. A 3-12 to 1-6 defeat of reigning champions Erin's Own secured a first championship medal for Reid.

Ballyhale made it three-in-a-row in 1980 following a 3-13 to 1-10 replay defeat of Muckalee/Ballyfoyle Rovers. After collecting a second championship medal as captain, Reid later added a Leinster medal to his collection as Coolderry were accounted for on a 3-10 to 1-8 score line. On 17 May 1981 Ballyhale faced a star-studded St. Finbarr's in the All-Ireland final. The sides were level on five occasions during the opening thirty minutes, however, the Shamrocks had the edge after a Liam Fennelly goal. Jimmy Barry-Murphy pegged one back for the Barr's in the closing stages, however, a 1-15 to 1-11 victory secured an All-Ireland medal foe Reid.

After moving to Dublin Reid joined the Faughs club. He won back-to-back championship medals in 1986 and 1987.

=== Minor and under-21 ===
Reid first played for Kilkenny as a member of the under-21 team in 1975. He was an unused substitute throughout the championship campaign which saw Kilkenny claim the Leinster and All-Ireland titles.

Kilkenny retained the provincial title in 1976 with Reid collecting a first Leinster medal on the field of play following a 3-21 to 0-5 trouncing of Wexford once again. The subsequent All-Ireland final was a replay of the previous year with Cork providing the opposition once again. The Rebels made no mistake on this occasion and secured a 2-17 to 1-8 victory.

Reid won a second successive Leinster medal in 1977 as Wexford were downed once again on a score line of 3-11 to 1-10. Cork were once again waiting for Kilkenny in the All-Ireland decider. Having been beating the previous year, the Cats made no mistake on this occasion and secured a narrow 2-9 to 1-9 victory. It was Reid's first All-Ireland medal on the field of play.

=== Senior ===
On 25 June 1978 Reid made his senior championship debut in a 2-17 to 1-4 Leinster semi-final defeat of Offaly. He later won his first Leinster medal with a narrow 2-16 to 1-16 defeat of reigning champions Wexford. On 3 September 1978 Kilkenny faced Cork in the All-Ireland decider, as the Rebels were bidding to become the first team in over twenty years to secure a third championship in succession. The game was far from the classic that was expected, with the decisive score coming from Jimmy Barry-Murphy whose low shot towards goal deceived Noel Skehan and trickled over the line. The 1-15 to 2-8 score line resulted in defeat for Hennessy’s side.

Reid won a second successive Leinster medal in 1979 as Wexford were defeated by 2-21 to 2-17. On 2 September 1979 Kilkenny faced Galway in the All-Ireland final. Bad weather and an unofficial train drivers’ strike resulted in the lowest attendance at a final in over twenty years. The bad weather also affected the hurling with Kilkenny scoring two freak goals as Galway ‘keeper Séamus Shinnors had a nightmare of a game. A Liam “Chunky” O’Brien 70-yard free went all the way to the net in the first half, while with just three minutes remaining a 45-yard shot from Mick Brennan was helped by the wind and dipped under the crossbar. Kilkenny won by 2-12 to 1-8 with Hennessy winning an All-Ireland medal.

In 1980 Reid was captain of the team, however, Offaly pulled off one of the shocks of the century when they defeated Kilkenny by 3-17 to 5-10 in the Leinster decider.

Reid's last game for Kilkenny was a 4-12 to 1-18 Leinster semi-final defeat by Wexford in 1981.

In 1988 Reid was chosen for the Dublin senior team. He enjoyed two unsuccessful seasons with the Metropolitans.

== Honours ==
=== Player ===
Ballyhale Shamrocks

- All-Ireland Senior Club Hurling Championship (1): 1981 (c)
- Leinster Senior Club Hurling Championship (1): 1980 (c)
- Kilkenny Senior Club Hurling Championship (2): 1979, 1980 (c)

Faughs

- Dublin Senior Club Hurling Championship (2): 1986, 1987

Kilkenny

- All-Ireland Senior Hurling Championship (1): 1979
- Leinster Senior Hurling Championship (2): 1978, 1979
- All-Ireland Under-21 Hurling Championship (2): 1975 (sub), 1977
- Leinster Under-21 Hurling Championship (3): 1975 (sub), 1976, 1977

Sporting positions
Preceded by Ger Fennelly	Kilkenny Senior Hurling Captain; 1980	Succeeded by Maurice Mason
Achievements
Preceded by Michael Connolly (Castlegar)	All-Ireland Senior Club Hurling Final winning captain 1981	Succeeded by Jimmy O'Brien (James Stephens)
