= 1987 Cork Senior Football Championship =

Gaelic football competition

- Dates: 2 May 1987 – 15 November 1987
- Teams: 22
- Champions: Nemo Rangers (8th title); Timmy Dalton (captain); Billy Morgan (manager)
- Runners-up: Imokilly; Seán Bowes (captain); Johnny Carroll (manager)

Tournament statistics
- Matches played: 21
- Goals scored: 38 (1.81 per match)
- Points scored: 320 (15.24 per match)
- Top scorer(s): Ephie Fitzgerald (1-15)

The 1987 Cork Senior Football Championship was the 99th staging of the Cork Senior Football Championship since its establishment by the Cork County Board in 1887. The draw for the opening round fixtures took place on 21 December 1986. The championship began on 2 May 1987 and ended on 15 November 1987.

Imokilly entered the championship as the defending champions.

On 15 November 1987, Nemo Rangers won the championship following a 2–11 to 0–09 defeat of Imokilly in the final. This was their eighth championship title overall and their first title since 1983.

Ephie Fitzgerald from the Nemo Rangers club was the championship's top scorer with 1–15.

== Team changes ==
=== To Championship ===
Promoted from the Cork Intermediate Football Championship

- Castletownbere

=== From Championship ===
Regraded to the Cork Intermediate Football Championship

- Bantry Blues
- Macroom

== Results ==
=== First round ===
| 2 May 1987 First round | Bishopstown | 0-05 - 1-05 | O'Donovan Rossa | Henry Ford Park, Ballinascarthy |
| | P McGrath 0-3, P Cahill 0-1, A Shiels 0-1. | | M Cahalane 1-1, I Breen 0-1, P Davis 0-1, A Davis 0-1, D O'Donovan 0-1. | Referee: L O'Flynn (Éire Óg) |

| 2 May 1987 First round | Midleton | 1-06 - 2-07 | Nemo Rangers | Riverstown Sportsfield, Sallybrook |
| | J Boylan 1-0, G Power 0-1, E Cleary 0-1, K Coakley 0-1, C O'Neill 0-1, N O'Neill 0-1, T Crotty 0-1. | | D Allen 1-2, E Fitzgerald 1-0, T Dalton 0-2, S O'Brien 0-2, T Nation 0-1. | Referee: E Porter (Brian Dillons) |

| 3 May 1987 First round | St. Finbarr's | 3-08 - 0-07 | Clonakilty | Charlie Hurley Park, Bandon |
| | T Power 2-3, M Barry 0-4, T Lehay 1-0, J Cremin 0-1. | | C O'Donovan 0-2, E O'Mahony 0-2, D Walsh 0-1, P Moriarty 0-1, F Lyons 0-1. | Referee: R Murphy (Lyre) |

| 3 May 1987 First round | St Michael's | 0-08 - 1-03 | Passage | Páirc Uí Chaoimh, Cork |
| | D Buckley 0-6, P Fitzgerald 0-1, I Aherne 0-1. | | D O'Mahony 1-0, T Lester 0-1, J Murphy 0-1, T Howard 0-1. | Referee: M Beecher |

| 3 May 1987 First round | University College Cork | 1-04 - 3-10 | Duhallow | Millstreet |
| | M Concur 1-0, F Daly 0-2, M Foley 0-1, B Harte 0-1. | | J Dennehy 2-2, Donal O'Connor 1-1, D Kelleher 0-2, D Culloty 0-2, D O'Mahony 0-2, P O'Connor 0-1. | Referee: D Casey (Ballyclough) |

| 10 May 1987 First round | Carrigdhoun | 0-05 - 4-11 | Castletownbere | Rossa Park, Skibbereen |
| | J Dineen 0-1, K Sheehan 0-1, R O'Sullivan 0-1, D Fitzgerald 0-1, J O'Donovan 0-1. | | Johnny Murphy 2-1, M O'Sullivan 1-4, J Power 1-2, C Collins 0-2, Jimmy Murphy 0-1, N Crowley 0-1. | Referee: P o'Donovan (Bantry) |

=== Second round ===
| 2 May 1987 Second round | Na Piarsaigh | 0-09 - 0-07 | Carbery | Clonakilty |
| | T O'Sullivan 0-3, M Mullins 0-2, R McDonnell 0-1, D Sheehan 0-1, K Myers 0-1, P O'Connor 0-1. | | P O'Driscoll 0-4, J Dullea 0-1, A McCarthy 0-1, J Cotter 0-1. | Referee: D Collins (Kinsale) |

| 3 May 1987 Second round | Seandún | 0-04 - 0-13 | Castlehaven | Clonakilty |
| | B Lane 0-3, M O'Regan 0-1. | | J Cleary 0-5, M O'Mahony 0-4, F Collins 0-2, M Connolly 0-1, N Cahalane 0-1. | Referee: N Hallahan (Bandon) |

| 27 June 1987 Second round | Avondhu | 1-09 - 1-07 | Duhallow | Kanturk |
| | W O'Riordan 1-5, M Murphy 0-1, D O'Connell 0-1, T Mannix 0-1, T Fitzgibbon 0-1. | | N O'Connor 1-3, J Dennehy 0-2, D Kelleher 0-1, S Hickey 0-1. | Referee: E porter (Brian Dillons) |

| 28 June 1987 Second round | O'Donovan Rossa | 2-05 - 0-07 | Millstreet | Macroom |
| | M McCarthy 1-1, M Cahalane 1-0, T Davis 0-1, P Davis 0-1, D O'Donovan 0-1, A Byrne 0-1. | | M Dennehy 0-2, L Dennehy 0-1, A Barry 0-1, C Cotter 0-1, J O'Leary 0-1, D Crowley 0-1. | Referee: D Casey (Ballyclough) |

| 28 June 1987 Second round | Beara | 0-06 - 3-12 | Nemo Rangers | Sam Maguire Park, Dunmanway |
| | C O'Sullivan 0-4, D Harrington 0-1, P Henley 0-1. | | D Allen 2-1, D Bevan 1-0, S Fahy 0-3, E Fitzgerald 0-3, T Dalton 0-2, G O'Regan 0-1, S O'Brien 0-1, J Kerrigan 0-1. | Referee: N Hallihan (Bandon) |

| 4 July 1987 Second round | St. Finbarr's | 0-09 - 0-10 | Muskerry | Ballinora |
| | D Barry 0-5, M Slocum 0-2, T Power 0-1, J Keating 0-1. | | M Kelleher 0-3, J O'Driscoll 0-3, C O'Connell 0-2, G O'Rourke 0-1, G Lally 0-1. | Referee: N Hallihan (Bandon) |

| 1 August 1987 Second round | Castletownbere | 3-07 - 0-08 | St. Nicholas' | Aghaville |
| | N Murphy 1-1, G 'Sullivan 1-1, O O'Sullivan 1-0, M O'Sullivan 0-3, Noel Murphy 0-2. | | K O'Shea 0-4, J Buckley 0-2, C Hartnett 0-1, C McGuckian 0-1. | Referee: P O'Donovan (Bantry Blues) |

| 5 September 1987 Second round | St Michael's | 2-03 - 1-12 | Imokilly | Páirc Uí Chaoimh, Cork |
| | P Ward 1-0, J Cashman 1-0, D Buckley 0-2, P Fitzgerald 0-1. | | M Hennessy 1-0, R Swaine 0-3, B Lotty 0-2, J Hegarty 0-2, T Murphy 0-2, A Barry 0-2, L Hedderman 0-1. | Referee: D Casey (Ballyclough) |

=== Quarter-finals ===
| 15 August 1987 Quarter-final | Na Piarsaigh | 1-08 - 0-10 | Avondhu | Clonmult Memorial Park, Midleton |
| | C Coughlan 1-1, M Mullins 0-3, J O'Sullivan 0-1, K Myers 0-1, D Daly 0-1, J O'Meara 0-1. | | W O'Riordan 0-6, P Harrington 0-1, T Mannix 0-1, C O'Sullivan 0-1, M Murphy 0-1. | Referee: J Motherway (Aghada) |

| 5 September 1987 Quarter-final | Nemo Rangers | 0-15 - 3-03 | O'Donovan Rossa | Charlie Hurley Park, Bandon |
| | E Fitzgerald 0-4, S Coughlan 0-3, S Fahy 0-3, C Murphy 0-2, G O'Regan 0-1, S O'Brien 0-1, J Kerrigan 0-1. | | A Byrne 1-1, I Breen 1-0, M Cahalane 1-0, M McCarthy 0-2. | Referee: M Keane (Cloughduv) |

| 6 September 1987 Quarter-final | Muskerry | 1-09 - 1-08 | Castlehaven | Clonakilty |
| | G Lally 1-1, J O'Driscoll 0-2, D McCarthy 0-1, M Kelleher 0-1, P Coleman 0-1, K Creed 0-1, G O'Rourke 0-1, C O'Connell 0-1. | | J Cleary 1-5, L Tompkins 0-1, M O'Brien 0-1, F Collins 0-1. | Referee: E Porter (Brian Dillons) |

| 27 September 1987 Quarter-final | Imokilly | 1-10 - 0-05 | Castletownbere | Cloughduv |
| | B Lotty 1-2, R Swaine 0-5, T McCarthy 0-1, L Hedderman 0-1, K Murphy 0-1. | | C Collins 0-1, M O'Sullivan 0-1, B O'Driscoll 0-1, N Murphy 0-1, J Murphy 0-1. | Referee: M Keane (Cloughduv) |

=== Semi-finals ===
| 11 October 1987 Semi-final | Imokilly | 0-09 - 0-06 | Na Piarsaigh | Páirc Uí Chaoimh, Cork |
| | M Spillane 0-4, R Swaine 0-3, B Óg Murphy 0-1, J Hegarty 0-1. | | R McDonnell 0-3, T O'Sullivan 0-3. | Referee: D casey (Ballyclough) |

| 11 October 1987 Semi-final | Nemo Rangers | 0-07 - 0-03 | Muskerry | Charlie Hurley Park, Bandon |
| | E Fitzgerald 0-3, T Dalton 0-2, C Murphy 0-1, D Bevan 0-1. | | D McCarthy 0-2, G Ring 0-1. | Referee: P O'Donovan (Bantry Blues) |

=== Final ===
| 15 November 1987 Final | Nemo Rangers | 2-11 - 0-09 | Imokilly | Páirc Uí Chaoimh, Cork |
| | S O'Brien 2-1, E Fitzgerald 0-5, T Nation 0-2, C Murphy 0-1, S Fahy 0-1, M Dorgan 0-1. | | B Lotty 0-2, T Murphy 0-2, R Swaine 0-2, D Burke 0-1, J Hegarty 0-1, T McCarthy 0-1. | Referee: D Casey |

== Championship statistics ==
=== Top scorers ===
Top scorers overall

| Rank | Player | Club | Tally | Total | Matches | Average |
|---|---|---|---|---|---|---|
| 1 | Ephie Fitzgerald | Nemo Rangers | 1-15 | 18 | 5 | 3.60 |
| 2 | William O'Riordan | Avondhu | 1-11 | 14 | 2 | 7.00 |
| 3 | John Cleary | Castlehaven | 1-10 | 13 | 2 | 6.50 |
| 3 | Robert Swaine | Imokilly | 0-13 | 13 | 4 | 3.25 |
| 5 | Dinny Allen | Nemo Rangers | 3-03 | 12 | 5 | 2-40 |
| 6 | Steven O'Brien | Nemo Rangers | 2-05 | 11 | 5 | 2.20 |
| 6 | Martin O'Sullivan | Castletownbere | 1-08 | 11 | 3 | 3.66 |
| 8 | Mattie Cahalane | O'Donovan Rossa | 3-01 | 10 | 3 | 3.33 |
| 8 | Tony Power | St. Finbarr's | 2-04 | 10 | 2 | 5.00 |
| 8 | Jim Dennehy | Duhallow | 2-04 | 10 | 2 | 5.00 |

Top scorers in a single game

| Rank | Player | Club | Tally | Total | Opposition |
|---|---|---|---|---|---|
| 1 | Tony Power | St. Finbarr's | 2-03 | 9 | Clonakilty |
| 2 | Jim Dennehy | Duhallow | 2-02 | 8 | UCC |
| 2 | William O'Riordan | Avondhu | 1-05 | 8 | Duhallow |
| 2 | John Cleary | Castlehaven | 1-05 | 8 | Muskerry |
| 5 | Johnny Murphy | Castletownbere | 2-01 | 7 | Carrigdhoun |
| 5 | Dinny Allen | Nemo Rangers | 2-01 | 7 | Beara |
| 5 | Steven O'Brien | Nemo Rangers | 2-01 | 7 | Imokilly |
| 5 | Martin O'Sullivan | Castletownbere | 1-04 | 7 | Carrigdhoun |
| 9 | Niall O'Connor | Duhallow | 1-03 | 6 | Avondhu |
| 9 | Danny Buckley | St Michael's | 0-06 | 6 | Passage |
| 9 | William O'Riordan | Avondhu | 0-06 | 6 | Na Piarsaigh |

=== Miscellaneous ===
- O'Donovan Rossa's 1–05 to 0–05 defeat of Bishopstown was their first ever victory at senior level.
