= Daniel Buckley (disambiguation) =

Daniel Buckley may refer to:

- Daniel Buckley (1890–1918), Irish survivor of Titanic sinking
- Danny Buckley (born 1957), Irish hurler
- Domhnall Ua Buachalla (born Daniel Buckley; 1866–1963), Irish politician and governor-general of the Irish Free State
