= Danny Buckley =

Irish retired hurler

Personal information
- Native name: Dónall Ó Buachalla (Irish)
- Born: 1957 (age 68–69) Blackrock, Cork, Ireland

Sport
- Sport: Hurling
- Position: Left corner-forward
Clubs
- Years: Club
- Blackrock; St Michael's
Club titles
- Cork titles: 3
- Munster titles: 2
- All-Ireland Titles: 1
Inter-county*
Years	County	Apps (scores)
1979-1980	Cork	0 (0-00)
Inter-county titles
- Munster titles: 1
- All-Irelands: 0
- NHL: 1
- All Stars: 0
- *Inter County team apps and scores correct as of 18:50, 22 March 2019.

Daniel Buckley (born 1957) is an Irish former hurler who played at club level with Blackrock and at inter-county level with the Cork senior hurling team. He usually lined out as a forward.

== Playing career ==
Buckley first came to prominence at juvenile and underage levels with the Blackrock club. After being a part of the inaugural Féile na nGael-winning team in 1971, he later enjoyed club championship successes at minor and under-21 levels. As a member of the Blackrock senior team, he won an All-Ireland Club Championship medal in 1979. At inter-county level, Buckley first appeared on the Cork team that won the All-Ireland Minor Championship title in 1974, before later winning an All-Ireland Under-21 Championship title in that grade in 1976. He was drafted onto the Cork senior hurling team in 1979 and won a Munster Championship title as a substitute that year. Buckley was also part of Cork's National Hurling League success in 1980 before later being released from the panel.

== Honours ==
Blackrock

- All-Ireland Senior Club Hurling Championship: 1979
- Munster Senior Club Hurling Championship: 1978, 1979
- Cork Senior Hurling Championship: 1978, 1979, 1985
- Féile na nGael: 1971

Cork

- Munster Senior Hurling Championship: 1979
- National Hurling League: 1979-80
- All-Ireland Under-21 Hurling Championship: 1976
- Munster Under-21 Hurling Championship: 1975, 1976, 1977
- All-Ireland Minor Hurling Championship: 1974
- Munster Minor Hurling Championship: 1974, 1975
