= 1987 All-Ireland Junior Football Championship =

All Ireland Champions
- Winners: Cork (7th win)
- Captain: Martin Kelleher

All Ireland Runners-up
- Runners-up: Warwickshire

Provincial Champions
- Munster: Cork
- Leinster: Dublin
- Ulster: Not Played
- Connacht: Not Played

The 1987 All-Ireland Junior Hurling Championship was the 57th staging of the All-Ireland Junior Championship, the Gaelic Athletic Association's second tier Gaelic football championship.

London were the defending champions, however, they were beaten in the Britain Junior Championship.

The All-Ireland final was played on 18 October 1987 at Páirc Uí Chaoimh in Cork, between Cork and Warwickshire, in what was their first meeting in the final in three years. Cork won the match by 0–14 to 0–03 to claim their seventh championship title overall and a first title since 1984.

== Results ==
=== All-Ireland Junior Football Championship ===
==== All-Ireland home final ====
25 July 1987 Home final	Cork	2-07 - 0-08	Dublin	Semple Stadium

==== All-Ireland final ====
18 October 1987 Final	Cork	0-14 - 0-03	Warwickshire	Páirc Uí Chaoimh
