= 1986 Cork Senior Football Championship =

Gaelic football competition

- Dates: 13 April 1986 – 28 September 1986
- Teams: 23
- Champions: Imokilly (2nd title); Kieran Murphy (captain); Pat O'Connor (manager)
- Runners-up: St. Finbarr's; John Kerins (captain); Gussie Harrington (manager)

Tournament statistics
- Matches played: 26
- Goals scored: 38 (1.46 per match)
- Points scored: 432 (16.62 per match)
- Top scorer(s): Paul McGrath (0-24)

The 1987 Cork Senior Football Championship was the 99th staging of the Cork Senior Football Championship since its establishment by the Cork County Board in 1887. The draw for the opening round fixtures took place on 26 January 1986. The championship began on 13 April 1986 and ended on 28 September 1986.

St. Finbarr's entered the championship as the defending champions.

On 28 September 1986, Imokilly won the championship following a 2-04 to 0-09 defeat of St. Finbarr's in the final. This was their second championship title overall and their first title since 1984.

Bishopstown's Paul McGrath was the championship's top scorer with 0-24.

== Team changes ==
=== To Championship ===
Promoted from the Cork Intermediate Football Championship

- O'Donovan Rossa

=== From Championship ===
Regraded to the Cork Intermediate Football Championship

- Naomh Abán

== Results ==
=== First round ===
| 13 April 1986 First round | St. Finbarr's | 0-13 - 0-05 | Duhallow | Macroom |
| | D Barry 0-4, R Kenny 0-4, T Power 0-1, G Desmond 0-1, T Leahy 0-1, D O'Mahony 0-1, M Barry 0-1. | | N O'Connor 0-3, D Kelleher 0-1, G O'Sullivan 0-1. | Referee: P O'Donovan (Bantry Blues) |

| 13 April 1986 First round | Bishopstown | 1-11 - 1-05 | Bantry Blues | Macroom |
| | P McGrath 0-7, G O'Mahony 1-1, A Shields 0-2, B O'Leary 0-1. | | L O'Brien 1-0, G Lynch 0-3, J Cotter 0-2. | Referee: J O'Mahony (Kanturk) |

| 20 April 1986 First round | Clonakilty | 0-09 - 0-12 | Nemo Rangers | Charlie Hurley Park, Bandon |
| | H Moynihan 0-3, T Scally 0-2, P Moriarty 0-1, M de Long 0-1, D Walsh 0-1, E O'Mahony 0-1. | | E Fitzgerald 0-8, D Allen 0-3, S Coughlan 0-1. |

| 20 April 1986 First round | Castlehaven | 1-12 - 1-08 | Macroom | Sam Maguire Park, Dunmanway |
| | J Cleary 0-7, TJ O'Regan 1-0, M Burns 0-2, F Collins 0-2, J O'Donovan 0-1. | | J Neville 1-1, S O'Connor 0-2, F Corrigan 0-2, J Henchion 0-1, M O'Riordan 0-1, D Crowley 0-1. | Referee: J O'Mahony (Kanturk) |

| 20 April 1986 First round | St Michael's | 1-03 - 1-12 | Na Piarsaigh | Páirc Uí Chaoimh, Cork |
| | J cashman 1-0, F O'Shea 0-1, T Ahern 0-1, D O'Gorman 0-1. | | T O'Sullivan 0-8, J O'Sullivan 1-2, D Sheehan 0-1, R McDonnell 0-1. | Referee: E Porter (Brian Dillons) |

| 20 April 1986 First round | Avondhu | 0-08 - 1-06 | Millstreet | Dromtariffe |
| | T Mannix 0-4, P Harrington 0-2, W O'Riordan 0-1, M Beston 0-1. | | A Barry 0-4, D Crowley 1-0, B McSweeney 0-1, M Dennehy 0-1. | Referee: D O'Connor |

| 20 April 1986 First round | Passage | 1-02 - 0-09 | Imokilly | Páirc Uí Chaoimh, Cork |
| | J O'Neill 1-0, T O'Neill 0-1, T Lester 0-1. | | M Spillane 0-2, G Morgan 0-2, T McCarthy 0-2, R Swain 0-1, B Ahern 0-1, J Hegarty 0-1. | Referee: J Crean (Kilmichael) |

=== Second round ===
| 13 April 1986 Second round | Carrigdhoun | 0-09 - 0-14 | Midleton | Páirc Uí Chaoimh, Cork |
| | K Sheehan 0-5, P O'Sullivan 0-2, J Dineen 0-1, M Fitzpatrick 0-1. | | C O'Neill 0-7, G Glavin 0-3, S O'Brien 0-2, K Hennessy 0-1, V O'Neill 0-1. | Referee: E Porter (Brian Dillons) |

| 20 April 1986 Second round | Carbery | 0-03 - 1-09 | Beara | Adrigole Park, Adrigole |
| | A McCarthy 0-2, G Ryan 0-1. | | DJ O'Shea 0-6, F McCarthy 1-0, P Murphy 0-1, F Harrington 0-1, C Collins 0-1. | Referee: P O'Donovan (Bantry Blues) |

| 17 May 1986 Second round | Muskerry | 1-11 - 1-08 | Millstreet | Macroom |
| | D McCarthy 1-3, J O'Driscoll 0-5, D Creedon 0-1, M Kelleher 0-1, S Murphy 0-1. | | A Barry 0-7, C Cotter 1-0, JW O'Leary 0-1. | Referee: P O'Donovan |

| 18 May 1986 Second round | Imokilly | 3-05 - 1-11 | Nemo Rangers | Fitzgerald Park, Fermoy |
| | T Murphy 2-1, R Swaine 1-2, M Spillane 0-2. | | E Fitzgerald 0-5, D Allen 1-1, S Hayes 0-3, M Dorgan 0-1, C Murphy 0-1. | Referee: J Dennigan (Fermoy) |

| 18 May 1986 Second round | Bishopstown | 1-14 - 0-05 | Seandún | Church Road, Blackrock |
| | P McGrath 0-10, P Cahill 1-1, J O'Mahony 0-2, T O'Sullivan 0-1. | | J McSweeney 0-2, M Hannon 0-1, K Hyland 0-1, D Sheehan 0-1. |

| 18 May 1986 Second round | St. Finbarr's | 1-08 - 0-08 | St. Nicholas' | Delaney Rovers Park, Kilbarry |
| | D Barry 1-1, T Power 0-2, M Barry 0-1, P Hayes 0-1, E Barrett 0-1, C Ryan 0-1, M Healy 0-1. | | P Long 0-5, J McCarthy 0-1, T Mulcahy 0-1, P Barry 0-1. | Referee: F Murphy |

| 18 May 1986 Second round | University College Cork | 0-08 - 0-08 | Castlehaven | Clonakilty |
| | E Moynihan 0-3, R Hickey 0-2, T Higgins 0-1, K Walsh 0-1, F Daly 0-1. | | J Cleary 0-4, F Collins 0-2, M Burns 0-1, J O'Donovan 0-1. | Referee: J Crean |

| 18 May 1986 Second round | O'Donovan Rossa | 1-09 - 1-10 | Na Piarsaigh | Páirc Naomh Eoin, Newcestown |
| | M McCarthy 1-6, P Davis 0-2, D O'Donovan 0-1. | | T O'Sullivan 0-6, J O'Sullivan 1-0, R McDonnell 0-3, P Martin 0-1. | Referee: M Keane (Cloughduv) |

| 24 May 1986 Second round replay | University College Cork | 2-03 - 1-06 | Castlehaven | Clonakilty |
| | B Harte 1-2, E Moynihan 1-0, J Walsh 0-1. | | J Cleary 0-5, J O'Donovan 1-0, D Cleary 0-1. | Referee: J Crean |

| 1 June 1986 Second round replay | Imokilly | 0-12 - 0-07 | Nemo Rangers | Fitzgerald Park, Fermoy |
| | B Aherne 0-5, T Murphy 0-2, K Murphy 0-2, G Morgan 0-1, M Spillane 0-1, J Hegarty 0-1. | | D Allen 0-3, E Fitzgerald 0-2, T Dalton 0-2. | Referee: J Dennigan (Fermoy) |

| 31 May 1986 Second round 2nd replay | University College Cork | 0-07 - 0-07 (game awarded to UCC) | Castlehaven | Clonakilty |
| | B Harte 0-4, K Walsh 0-2, J Keane 0-1. | | N Cahalane 0-3, J Cleary 0-2, TJ O'Regan 0-1, D Cleary 0-1. |

=== Quarter-finals ===
| 22 June 1986 Quarter-final | Imokilly | 2-08 - 0-09 | Muskerry | Páirc Uí Chaoimh, Cork |
| | R Swaine 0-5, B Murphy 1-1, T Murphy 1-0, M Hennesssy 0-1, T McCarthy 0-1. | | S O'Driscoll 0-7, S Murphy 0-2. | Referee: F Murphy |

| 22 June 1986 Quarter-final | Bishopstown | 1-12 - 2-09 | Midleton | Riverstown Sportsfield, Sallybrook |
| | P Cahill 1-2, P McGrath 0-3, J Egan 0-3, B Coffey 0-1, R Lyons 0-1, P Moran 0-1, M McGrath 0-1. | | G Power 1-1, S Power 1-1, K Hennessy 0-3, C O'Neill 0-2, V O'Neill 0-1, G Glavin 0-1. | Referee: J Dennigan (Fermoy) |

| 22 June 1986 Quarter-final | St. Finbarr's | 1-10 - 0-02 | University College Cork | Church Road, Blackrock |
| | D O'Mahony 1-2, D Barry 0-5, M Barry 0-1, M Healy 0-1, E Barrett 0-1. | | E Moynihan 0-1, J Walsh 0-1. | Referee: E Porter (Brian Dillons) |

| 22 June 1986 Quarter-final | Na Piarsaigh | 1-08 - 2-04 | Beara | Sam Maguire Park, Dunmanway |
| | T O'Sullivan 0-5, P Martin 1-1, M McCarthy 0-1, K Myers 0-1. | | DJ O'Shea 1-2, P Murphy 1-0, C Collins 0-2. | Referee: N Hallahan (Bandon) |

| 26 July 1986 Quarter-final replay | Bishopstown | 1-11 - 2-11 | Midleton | Riverstown Sportsfield, Sallybrook |
| | P McGrath 0-4, T O'Sullivan 1-0, B Coffey 0-3, G O'Mahony 0-3, J Egan 0-1. | | C O'Neill 0-7, K Hennessy 1-1, J Boylan 1-0, G Fitzgerald 0-2, P Hartnett 0-1. | Referee: J Dennigan (Fermoy) |

=== Semi-finals ===
| 2 August 1986 Semi-final | St. Finbarr's | 1-08 - 0-10 | Na Piarsaigh | Páirc Uí Chaoimh, Cork |
| | D Barry 0-5, M Barry 1-0, M Healy 0-1, P Hayes 0-1, K McCarthy 0-1. | | T O'Sullivan 0-3, R McDonnell 0-2, M McCarthy 0-2, D Sheehan 0-1, K Myers 0-1, J O'Sullivan 0-1. | Referee: E Porter (Brian Dillons) |

| 3 August 1986 Semi-final | Imokilly | 1-14 - 0-06 | Midleton | Clonmult Memorial Park, Midleton |
| | B Ahern 0-5, T Murphy 1-1, R Swaine 0-2, D Walsh 0-2, K Murphy 0-1, B Óg Murphy 0-1, M Hennessy 0-1, M Spillane 0-1. | | C O'Neill 0-4, G Glavin 0-1, G Power 0-1. | Referee: F Murphy |

=== Final ===
| 28 September 1986 Final | Imokilly | 2-04 - 0-09 | St. Finbarr's | Páirc Uí Chaoimh, Cork |
| | R Swaine 1-1, B Lotty 1-0, B Aherne 0-1, T McCarthy 0-1, K Murphy 0-1. | | D Barry 0-4, M Slocum 0-3, J Allen 0-1, K McCarthy 0-1. | Referee: P o'Donovan (Bantry Blues) |

== Championship statistics ==
=== Top scorers ===
Top scorers overall

| Rank | Player | Club | Tally | Total | Matches | Average |
|---|---|---|---|---|---|---|
| 1 | Paul McGrath | Bishopstown | 0-24 | 24 | 4 | 6.00 |
| 2 | Dave Barry | St. Finbarr's | 1-19 | 22 | 5 | 4.40 |
| 2 | Tony O'Sullivan | Na Piarsaigh | 0-22 | 22 | 4 | 5.50 |
| 4 | Colm O'Neill | Midleton | 0-20 | 20 | 4 | 5.00 |
| 5 | John Cleary | Castlehaven | 0-18 | 18 | 4 | 4.50 |
| 6 | Robert Swaine | Imokilly | 2-11 | 17 | 5 | 3.60 |
| 7 | Tadhg Murphy | Imokilly | 4-04 | 16 | 5 | 3.20 |
| 8 | Ephie Fitzgerald | Nemo Rangers | 0-15 | 15 | 3 | 5.00 |
| 9 | Seán O'Driscoll | Muskerry | 0-12 | 12 | 2 | 6.00 |
| 9 | Billy Ahern | Imokilly | 0-12 | 12 | 5 | 2.60 |

Top scorers in a single game

| Rank | Player | Club | Tally | Total | Opposition |
|---|---|---|---|---|---|
| 1 | Paul McGrath | Bishopstown | 0-10 | 10 | Seandún |
| 2 | Mick McCarthy | O'Donovan Rossa | 1-06 | 9 | Na Piarsaigh |
| 3 | Ephie Fitzgerald | Nemo Rangers | 0-09 | 9 | Clonakilty |
| 3 | Tony O'Sullivan | Na Piarsaigh | 0-09 | 9 | St Michael's |
| 5 | Tadhg Murphy | Imokilly | 2-01 | 7 | Nemo Rangers |
| 5 | Paul McGrath | Bishopstown | 0-07 | 7 | Bantry Blues |
| 5 | John Cleary | Castlehaven | 0-07 | 7 | Macroom |
| 5 | Colm O'Neill | Midleton | 0-07 | 7 | Carrigdhoun |
| 5 | Anthony Barry | Millstreet | 0-07 | 7 | Muskerry |
| 5 | Seán O'Driscoll | Muskerry | 0-07 | 7 | Imokilly |
| 5 | Colm O'Neill | Midleton | 0-07 | 7 | Bishopstown |

=== Miscellaneous ===
- O'Donovan Rossa return to the senior championship.
- Castlehaven were thrown out of the championship by a vote of 56 to 2 after walking off the field in their second round second replay with University College Cork.
