= 1972–73 Harty Cup =

Hurling tournament

1972–73 Dr Harty Cup
- Dates: 15 October 1972 – 11 March 1973
- Teams: 10
- Champions: St Finbarr's College (5th title); John Delaney (captain); Michael O'Brien (manager)
- Runners-up: Cashel CBS

Tournament statistics
- Matches played: 7
- Goals scored: 55 (7.86 per match)
- Points scored: 104 (14.86 per match)
- Top scorer(s): Tadhg Murphy (7-05)

The 1972–73 Harty Cup was the 53rd staging of the Harty Cup since its establishment by the Munster Council of the Gaelic Athletic Association in 1918. The competition ran from 15 October 1972 to 11 March 1973. A change in format saw the winners of the B-grade Corn Phádraig enter at the semi-final stage.

St Finbarr's College successfully defended its title in the Harty Cup final, 5–14 to 2–05, on 11 March 1973 at Dr Mannix Sportsfield in Charleville, against Cashel CBS. It was their first meeting in the final and St Finbarr's College fifth successive Harty Cup title overall and a third consecutive title.

St Finbarr's College's Tadhg Murphy was the top scorer with 7-05.

== Results ==
=== First round ===
15 October 1972 First round	St Colman's College	6-09 - 5-05	St Flannan's College	FitzGerald Park
	PJ Stokes 2-2, E Carey 1-5, A Monahan 2-0, P Barry 1-0, J O'Brien 0-2.		F Hogan 3-0, R Gill 1-1, V Daly 1-0, A Power 0-2, T Moloney 0-1, H Colleran 0-1.

15 October 1972 First round	St Finbarr's College	4-14 - 4-02	Limerick CBS	Dr Mannix Sportsfield
	T Murphy 2-1, J Higgins 1-4, J O'Flynn 0-5, S O'Donovan 1-0, P Crowley 0-2, J Delaney 0-2.		S Burke 1-1, J Brosnan 1-0, B Neeson 1-0, F Broughan 1-0, P Dowling 0-1.

23 October 1972 First round	De La Salle College Waterford	3-14 - 4-05	Coláiste Chríost Rí	Cappoquin Grounds
	S Whelan 2-5, T Maher 1-0, J Martin 0-3, T Summers 0-2, S Twomey 0-1, D Griffin 0-1, R Heffernan 0-1, J Carpendale 0-1.

25 October 1972 First round	Coláiste Iognáid Rís	5-08 - 2-07	Thurles CBS	Dr Mannix Sportsfield
	R Barry 2-1, M O'Connell 2-1, D Kavanagh 0-5, D McCartan 1-0, T Cullinane 0-1.		S Lyons 1-1, D Maher 1-1, T McGrath 0-2, T Finn 0-2, J Fitzgerald 0-1.

=== Second round ===
15 November 1972 Second round	St Colman's College	3-08 - 3-03 (declared void)	North Monastery	Clonmult Memorial Park
	E Carey 1-3, A Monaghan 1-1, P Barry 1-1, K Lane 0-1, J O'Brien 0-1, PJ Stokes 0-1.		J Allen 2-1, S Farrell 1-2.

=== Semi-finals ===
28 February 1973 Semi-final	St Finbarr's College	4-06 - 2-01	Coláiste Iognáid Rís	Ballinlough Grounds
	T Murphy 4-1, C Canty 0-3, J Crowley 0-1, J O'Flynn 0-1.		T Beckett 1-0, P O'Sullivan 1-0, T Howard 0-1

4 March 1973 Semi-final	Cashel CBS	5-08 - 4-06	De La Salle College Waterford	Kilsheelan Grounds
	J Grogan 3-4, F Fitzell 1-2, J Gleeson 1-0, J Looby 0-2.		J Martin 1-3, S Twomey 1-2, S Whelan 1-1, D Heffernan 1-0.

=== Final ===
11 March 1973 Final	St Finbarr's College	5-14 - 2-05	Cashel CBS	Dr Mannix Sportsfield
	J O'Flynn 1-5, T Murphy 1-3, F Canty 1-1, J Higgins 1-1, K O'Driscoll 1-1, J Crowley 0-3.		J Grogan 1-1, J Luby 1-0, P Fitzell 0-2, PJ O'Brien 0-1, J Gleeson 0-1.

== Statistics ==
=== Top scorers ===
Rank	Player	County	Tally	Total	Matches	Average
1	Tadhg Murphy	St Finbarr's College	7-05	26	3	8.66
2	John Grogan	Cashel CBS	4-05	17	2	8.50
3	S. Whelan	De La Salle College	3-06	15	2	7.50
4	John O'Flynn	St Finbarr's College	1-11	14	3	4.66
5	John Higgins	St Finbarr's College	2-05	11	3	3.66

=== Miscellaneous ===
- St Colman's College and North Monastery were disqualified from the competition. Both schools launched objections on the other over technical issues and team registration, however, when no agreement was reached the Munster Colleges' Council disqualified both schools from the competition.
