= 1973–74 Harty Cup =

Hurling tournament

1973–74 Dr Harty Cup
- Dates: 24 October 1973 – 31 March 1974
- Teams: 11
- Champions: St Finbarr's College (6th title); Tadhg Murphy (captain); Michael O'Brien (manager)
- Runners-up: Limerick CBS; Finbarr Brougham (captain)

Tournament statistics
- Matches played: 10
- Goals scored: 70 (7 per match)
- Points scored: 130 (13 per match)
- Top scorer(s): Tadhg Murphy (6-20)

The 1973–74 Harty Cup was the 54th staging of the Harty Cup since the establishment in hurling by the Munster Council of the Gaelic Athletic Association in 1918.

St Finbarr's College successfully defended its title in the Harty Cup final. 10–11 to 2–02, on 31 March 1974 at Dr Mannix Sportsfield in Charleville, against Limerick CBS. It was their second successive meeting in the final overall after a hiatus from their first final meeting since 1967; and St Finbarr's College sixth successive Harty Cup title overall and a record-equalising fourth title in succession.

Tadhg Murphy successfully defended his top scorer achievement of 6-20, from that of 1972.

== Results ==
=== First round ===
24 October 1973 First round	St Finbarr's College	5-13 - 0-03	North Monastery	Cork Athletic Grounds
	T Murphy 2-4, G McEvoy 2-1, P Regan 1-2, J Crowley 0-2, P Hayes 0-1, J Higgins 0-1, F Tobin 0-1, F Collins 0-1.		P Horgan 0-2, J Nodwell 0-1.

28 October 1973 First round	St Flannan's College	0-05 - 1-06	St Colman's College	FitzGerald Park
	D Hassett 0-1, M Ryan 0-1, T Hickey 0-1, B Smyth 0-1, F Hogan 0-1.		J Hayes 1-0, PJ Stokes 0-3, P Corbett 0-2, P Barry 0-1.

14 November 1973 First round	Coláiste Iognáid Rís	12-07 - 1-02	Coláiste Chríost Rí	Cork Athletic Grounds
	D Kavanagh 4-1, T Beckett 4-0, P O'Sullivan 3-0, T Cullinane 1-5, T Howard 0-1.		R O'Sullivan 1-2.

=== Quarter-finals ===
27 October 1973 Quarter-final	Limerick CBS	5-09 - 2-06	De La Salle College Waterford	Leahy Park
	K Canty 2-4, K Herbert 1-4, T Treacy 1-0, B Skelly 1-0, L O'Connor 0-1.		S Cooney 1-1, J Carpendale 1-0, DK Ryan 0-2, C Walsh 0-2, D Kirwan 0-1.

8 November 1973 Quarter-final	Thurles CBS	3-10 - 3-09	Ennis CBS	St Ailbe's Park
	T McGrath 1-7, M Cooney 2-1, N Mockler 0-1, J Doyle 0-1.		G O'Loughlin 1-2, D O'Connor 1-1, J Pine 1-0, D O'Loughlin 0-3, P O'Loughlin 0-2, P Hehir 0-1.

18 November 1973 Quarter-final	St Finbarr's College	7-08 - 4-03	St Colman's College	Clonmult Memorial Park
	T Murphy 2-6, J Higgins 1-2, M O'Sullivan 1-0, P Hayes 1-0, F Collins 1-0, goal from a melee.		PJ Stokes 1-1, P Corbett 1-1, S O'Mahony 1-0, G Hayes 1-0, P Barry 0-1.

13 February 1974 Quarter-final	Coláiste Iognáid Rís	1-03 - 4-06	Templemore CBS	Leahy Park
	T Cullinane 1-0, P Sullivan 0-2, D Curtin 0-1.		S Bourke 4-3, P Bourke 0-3.

=== Semi-finals ===
6 March 1974 Semi-final	Limerick CBS	1-06 - 2-01	Thurles CBS	St Ailbe's Park
	K Canty 1-2, P Hanrahan 0-3, D Brougham 0-1.		K Dwyer 1-0, M Cooney 1-0, D Connolly 0-1.

13 March 1974 Semi-final	St Finbarr's College	5-19 - 2-01	Templemore CBS	Dr Mannix Sportsfield
	F Tobin 2-1, T Murphy 0-7, J Higgins 1-3, K O'Driscoll 0-4, G McEvoy 1-0, P Regan 0-2, T Hourihane 0-1, F Collins 0-1.		S Bourke 2-1.

=== Final ===
31 March 1974 Final	St Finbarr's College	10-11 - 2-02	Limerick CBS	Dr Mannix Sportsfield
	G McEvoy 4-2, T Murphy 2-3, JJ Murphy 3-0, F Tobin 1-1, J Crowley 0-2, K O'Driscoll 0-2, J Higgins 0-1.		K Canty 2-1, K Herbert 0-1.	Referee: J Moloney (Tipperary)

== Statistics ==
=== Top scorers ===
Rank	Player	County	Tally	Total	Matches	Average
1	Tadhg Murphy	St Finbarr's College	6-20	38	4	9.50
2	Ger McEvoy	St Finbarr's College	7-04	25	4	6.25
3	Séamus Bourke	Templemore CBS	6-04	22	2	11.00
3	Kieran Canty	Limerick CBS	5-07	22	3	7.33
5	Derry Kavanagh	Coláiste Iognáid Rís	4-01	13	1	13.00
