= 1971–72 Harty Cup =

Hurling tournament

1971–72 Dr Harty Cup
- Dates: 6 October 1971 – 19 March 1972
- Teams: 10
- Champions: St Finbarr's College (4th title); Tom Fogarty (captain); Michael O'Brien (manager)
- Runners-up: St Flannan's College; John Callinan (captain)

Tournament statistics
- Matches played: 9
- Goals scored: 67 (7.44 per match)
- Points scored: 114 (12.67 per match)
- Top scorer(s): Tom Fogarty (3-16)

The 1971–72 Harty Cup was the 52nd staging of the Harty Cup since the establishment of the hurling competition by the Munster Council of the Gaelic Athletic Association in 1918. The draw for the opening round fixtures took place on 18 September 1971. The competition ran from 6 October 1971 to 19 March 1972.

St Finbarr's College successfully defended its title at the Harty Cup final 6–11 to 2–07 played on 19 March 1972 at Dr Mannix Sportsfield in Charleville, against St Flannan's College. It was their third overall meeting in a final and a rematch from the previous year. It was St Finbarr's College's fourth overall Harty Cup title and first consecutive two year set titles.

St Finbarr's College's Tom Fogarty was the top scorer with 3–16.

== Results ==
=== First round ===
6 October 1971 First round	Thurles CBS	4-03 - 7-09	Coláiste Chríost Rí	Páirc Mac Gearailt
	R Stakelum 3-0, P Fitzpatrick 1-0, M Joyce 0-2, M Byrne 0-1.		B Óg Murphy 3-1, J Ryan 1-2, R O'Sullivan 1-1, W Barry 1-1, D Murphy 1-0, P Morris 0-2, K Murphy 0-2.

24 October 1971 First round	St Colman's College	8-03 - 3-01	De La Salle College Waterford	Cappoquin Grounds
	E O'Sullivan 3-2, B Corbett 2-0, M Lehane 2-0, A Monaghan 1-0, D Barry 0-1.		M Kehoe 2-0, P Moore 1-0, J Martin 0-1.

=== Quarter-finals ===
27 October 1971 Quarter-final	St Finbarr's College	3-13 - 1-07	Coláiste Chríost Rí	Cork Athletic Grounds
	T Fogarty 0-9, P Kelliher 1-3, B Mackessy 1-0, D Dwyer 1-0, T O'Sullivan 0-1.		B Óg Murphy 1-2, L Good 0-2, R O'Sullivan 0-2, J Ryan 0-1.

27 October 1971 Quarter-final	Ennis CBS	2-07 - 3-03	Limerick CBS	Páirc an Dálaigh
	M Griffin 2-0, H O'Connell 0-5, K Kennedy 0-1, P Hill 0-1.		E Tuohy 2-2, E Mitchell 1-0, D Kelleher 0-1.

10 November 1971 Quarter-final	North Monastery	7-12 - 1-00	Coláiste Iognáid Rís	Cork Athletic Grounds
	L Shanahan 2-2, D O'Grady 2-2, J Farrell 1-4, T Collins 2-0, R Fitzgerald 0-3, N Barry 0-1.		S O'Connell 1-0.

14 November 1971 Quarter-final	St Flannan's College	0-12 - 1-05	St Colman's College	St Ailbe's Park

=== Semi-finals ===
20 February 1972 Semi-final	St Flannan's College	7-09 - 2-02	Ennis CBS	Páirc an Dálaigh
	S Stack 2-5, H Colleran 2-1, T Crowe 1-1, R Gill 1-0, J Ryan 1-0, L O'Brien 0-1, J Callinan 0-1.		M O'Connell 2-1, C Kennedy 0-1.

1 March 1972 Semi-final	St Finbarr's College	5-06 - 5-04	North Monastery	Cork Athletic Grounds
	T Fogarty 2-3, T O'Sullivan 2-0, M Coughlan 1-1, B Mackessy 0-2.		T Collins 3-0, R Fitzgerald 1-2, D O'Grady 1-0, J Farrell 0-1, N Corcoran 0-1.	Referee: F Murphy (Blackrock)

=== Final ===
19 March 1972 Final	St Finbarr's College	6-11 - 2-07	St Flannan's College	Dr Mannix Sportsfield
	T Fogarty 1-4, M Coughlan 1-4, R Cott 2-0, T Murphy 1-1, T O'Sullivan 1-0, D O'Dwyer 0-1, W Mackessy 0-1.		J Callanan 1-3, R Gill 1-1, L O'Brien 0-2, H Colleran 0-1.	Referee: J Moloney (Tipperary)

== Statistics ==
=== Top scorers ===
Rank	Player	County	Tally	Total	Matches	Average
1	Tom Fogarty	St Finbarr's College	3-16	25	3	8.33
2	Tom Collins	North Monastery	5-00	15	2	7.50
2	Bertie Óg Murphy	Coláiste Chríost Rí	4-04	15	2	7.50
