= 1975 All-Ireland Under-21 Hurling Championship final =

1975 All-Ireland Under-21 Hurling Championship Final
- Event: 1975 All-Ireland Under-21 Hurling Championship
Kilkenny	Cork
5-13	2-19
- Date: 12 October 1975
- Venue: Fraher Field, Dungarvan
- Referee: Seán O'Meara (Tipperary)

The 1975 All-Ireland Under-21 Hurling Championship final was a hurling match that was played at Fraher Field, Dungarvan on 12 October 1975 to determine the winners of the 1975 All-Ireland Under-21 Hurling Championship, the 12th season of the All-Ireland Under-21 Hurling Championship, a tournament organised by the Gaelic Athletic Association for the champion teams of the four provinces of Ireland. The final was contested by Cork of Munster and Kilkenny of Leinster, with Kilkenny winning by 5-13 to 2-19.

The All-Ireland final between Cork and Kilkenny was their second championship meeting. Cork, appearing in their 7th final, were hoping to win their 7th title in 10 years. Kilkenny, the reigning champions, were appearing in their third final.

Kilkenny's All-Ireland victory was their second in-a-row. The victory installed them as joint second on the all-time roll of honour.

== Match ==
=== Details ===
12 October 1975

Kilkenny	5-13 – 2-19	Cork
T Brennan 2-0, J Lyng 0-5, R Sweeney 1-1, B Cody 1-1, M Tierney 1-1, G Fennelly 0-3, B Fitzpatrick 0-2.		J Fenton 0-9, B Murphy 0-7, S Farrelkl 1-2, T O'Sullivan 1-0, F Delaney 0-1.

Fraher Field, Dungarvan
Referee: S O'Meara (Tipperary)
