= 1970–71 Harty Cup =

Hurling tournament

1970–71 Dr Harty Cup
- Dates: 25 October 1970 – 14 March 1971
- Teams: 11
- Champions: St Finabrr's College (3rd title); Barry Murphy (captain)
- Runners-up: St Flannan's College

Tournament statistics
- Matches played: 10
- Goals scored: 69 (6.9 per match)
- Points scored: 125 (12.5 per match)
- Top scorer(s): Pat Healy (6-06)

The 1970–71 Harty Cup was the 51st staging of the Harty Cup since the establishment of the hurling competition by the Munster Council of the Gaelic Athletic Association in 1918. The draw for the opening round fixtures took place on 19 September 1970. The competition contested from 25 October 1970 to 14 March 1971.

North Monastery unsuccessfully defended its title losing to Coláiste Iognáid Rís in the first round.

St Finbarr's College won the Harty Cup final, 4–12 to 2–04, on 14 March 1971 at Thurles Sportsfield against St Flannan's College at their second overall cup history meeting after a hiatus since 1952; and St Finbarr's third successive Harty Cup title overall, having won the first title in 1969.

Coláiste Iognáid Rís's Pat Healy was the top scorer with 6-06.

== Results ==
=== First round ===
25 October 1970 First round	Thurles CBS	5-18 - 2-01	Mount Sion CBS	Leahy Park
	J Burke 1-9, T Lowry 2-3, J McCormack 1-1, M Butler 0-4, B Stakelum 1-0, J Keane 0-1.		A Fitzgerald 1-1, T Healy 1-0.

28 October 1970 First round	St Colman's College	7-11 - 4-05	De La Salle College Waterford	Clonmel GAA Ground
	E O'Sullivan 2-3, M Magner 2-1, D McGovern 0-5, T Hannon 1-1, M Lehane 1-0, G Lynes 1-0, E Sheehan 0-1.		L O'Brien 2-1, D Corcoran 2-0, M O'Meara 0-2, T Twomey 0-1, P McCarthy 0-1.

11 November 1970 First round	North Monastery	2-04 - 6-03	Coláiste Iognáid Rís	Cork Athletic Grounds
	T Collins 2-1, R Fitzgerald 0-2, S Greene 0-1.		P Healy 3-2, T Goulding 3-0, A Creagh 0-1.

- St Finbarr's College, St Flannan's College, Limerick CBS, Coláiste Chríost Rí and Ennis CBS received byes in this round.

=== Quarter-finals ===
11 November 1970 Quarter-final	Limerick CBS	3-02 - 3-09	Ennis CBS	Fr Murphy Memorial Park
	O Naughton 2-0, M Keogh 1-1 O Coffey 0-1.		H O'Connell 2-5, F Quinn 1-0, J Johnson 0-2, K McNamara 0-1, J Sheehan 0-1.

14 November 1970 Quarter-final	St Finbarr's College	3-08 - 1-03	Thurles CBS	Fr Con Buckley Park
	A Hickey 1-1, J O'Donovan 1-0, F O'Regan 1-0, D O'Dwyer 0-3, G Hennessy 0-3, T Fogarty 0-1.		J Cormack 1-0, L Hassett 0-2, J Burke 0-1.

15 November 1970 Quarter-final	St Flannan's College	4-09 - 2-02	St Colman's College	St Ailbe's Park
	J Treacy 3-3, C Honan 1-2, D O'Dwyer 0-2, T Crowe 0-2.		E O'Sullivan 2-1, D McGovern 0-1.

2 December 19770 Quarter-final	Coláiste Chríost Rí	1-05 - 3-08	Coláiste Iognáid Rís	Cork Athletic Grounds
	J Ryan 1-1, R O'Sullivan 0-3, K Doherty 0-1.		T Goulding 2-1, P Healy 1-2, P O'Connell 0-3, D McCarthy 0-1, P O'Sullivan 0-1.

=== Semi-finals ===
21 February 1971 Semi-final	St Flannan's College	2-07 - 1-04	Ennis CBS	Dr Daly Memorial Park
	C Honan 2-0, J Treacy 0-4, J Callinan 0-2, M Burke 0-1.		M O'Connell 0-4, N Glynn 1-0.

28 February 1971 Semi-final	St Finbarr's College	9-05 - 5-05	Coláiste Iognáid Rís	Cork Athletic Grounds
	J O'Donovan 3-0, T Fogarty 3-0, F O'Regan 2-1, M Crowley 1-1, G Hennessy 0-2, B Murphy 0-1.		P O'Sullivan 3-0, P Healy 2-2, T Goulding 0-2, A Creagh 0-1.

=== Final ===
14 March 1971 Final	St Finbarr's College	4-12 - 2-04	St Flannan's College	Thurles Sportsfield
	G Hennessy 1-4, T Fogarty 1-4, F O'Regan 1-0, S O'Donovan 1-0, D Dwyer 0-2, M Crowley 0-1, S Murphy 0-1.		S Treacy 1-1, T Crowe 1-0, P Scanlon 0-1, S Callinan 0-1, C Honan 0-1.

== Statistics ==
=== Top scorers ===
Rank	Player	County	Tally	Total	Matches	Average
1	Pat Healy	Coláiste Iognáid Rís	6-06	24	3	8.00
2	John Treacy	St Flannan's College	4-08	20	3	6.66
3	Tony Goulding	Coláiste Iognáid Rís	5-03	18	3	6.00
4	Tom Fogarty	Coláiste Iognáid Rís	4-05	17	3	5.66
5	Éamonn O'Sullivan	St Colman's College	4-04	16	2	8.00
6	John O'Donovan	St Finbarr's College	5-00	15	3	5.00
7	Haulie O'Connell	St Flannan's College	2-09	15	2	7.50
8	John Burke	Thurles CBS	1-10	13	2	6.50
9	Finbarr O'Regan	St Finbarr's College	4-01	13	3	4.33
10	Colm Honan	St Flannan's College	3-03	12	3	4.00
10	Gerry Hennessy	St Finbarr's College	1-09	12	3	4.00
