= 1984 Cork Senior Football Championship =

Gaelic football competition

- Dates: 15 April 1984 – 14 October 1984
- Teams: 22
- Champions: Imokilly (1st title); Conor Counihan (captain)
- Runners-up: St. Finbarr's; Damien Philpott (captain); Pat Lougheed (manager)

Tournament statistics
- Matches played: 24
- Goals scored: 58 (2.42 per match)
- Points scored: 385 (16.04 per match)
- Top scorer(s): Niall O'Connor (2-17)

The 1984 Cork Senior Football Championship was the 96th staging of the Cork Senior Football Championship since its establishment by the Cork County Board in 1887. The draw for the opening round fixtures took place on 29 January 1984. The championship began on 15 April 1984 and ended on 14 October 1984.

Nemo Rangers entered the championship as the defending champions, however, they were beaten by Carbery in the second round.

On 14 October 1984, Imokilly won the championship following a 1-14 to 2-07 defeat of St. Finbarr's in the final. This was their first ever championship title.

Duhallow's Niall O'Connor was the championship's top scorer with 2-17.

== Results ==
=== First round ===
15 April 1984 First round	St. Finbarr's	0-08 - 0-08	Castlehaven	Charlie Hurley Park, Bandon
	D Barry 0-5, F O'Mahony 0-1, R Kenny 0-1, J Cremin 0-1.		J Cleary 0-6, M O'Brien 0-1, M Burns 0-1.	Referee: D Casey (Ballyclough)

15 April 1984 First round	Muskerry	1-09 - 0-06	Avondhu	Páirc Uí Chaoimh, Cork
	P Barrett 1-2, J O'Sullivan 0-2, D O'Driscoll 0-2, C McGrath 0-1, T O'Reilly 0-1, M Kelleher 0-1.		J O'Donoghue 0-3, C O'Neill 0-1, P Harrington 01-, J Fuohy 0-1.

15 April 1984 First round	Millstreet	1-06 - 1-06	Clonakilty	Macroom
	B McSweeney 1-2, C Cotter 0-2, L Dennehy 0-1, A Barry 0-1.		E O'Mahony 1-5, T O'Regan 0-1.

15 April 1984 First round	Passage	1-14 - 1-06	Beara	Rossa Park, Skibbereen
	K O'Reilly 0-5, J Sullivan 0-4, R Sullivan 1-0, C O'Reilly 0-2, E Palmer 0-2, J Hanley 0-1.		JF O'Sullivan 1-0, D O'Driscoll 0-2, O O'Sullivan 0-1, C Collins 0-1, J Murphy 0-1, S O'Shea 0-1.

21 April 1984 First round	St Michael's	1-04 - 2-09	Duhallow	Buttevant
	M Kilcoyle 1-0, D Buckley 0-2, T Cashman 0-2.		J Fitzgerald 1-0, G O'Sullivan 1-0, T Healy 0-3, J Dennehy 0-3, N O'Connor 0-2, D O'Mahony 0-1, P O'Connor 0-1.

21 April 1984 First round replay	St. Finbarr's	1-09 - 0-06	Castlehaven	Charlie Hurley Park, Bandon
	F O'Mahony 1-3, M Healy 0-2, D Barry 0-1, T Leahy 0-1, K McCarthy 0-1, M Sclocum 0-1.		M Burns 0-2, J Cleary 0-2, B Terry 0-1, A Collins 0-1.	Referee: D Casey (Ballyclough)

22 April 1984 First round replay	Millstreet	0-09 - 0-05	Clonakilty	Macroom
	A Barry 0-6, L Donnelly 0-1, C Cotter 0-1, GW O'Leary 0-1.		E O'Mahony 0-3, J O'Donovan 0-1, J Walsh 0-1.

28 April 1984 First round	Imokilly	3-09 - 1-02	Bishopstown	Mayfield
	T Murphy 2-1, S Hegarty 1-1, B Ahern 0-2, T McCarthy 0-2, B Lotty 0-2, G Glavin 0-1.		G McCarthy 1-0, J Crowley 0-1, P McGrath 0-1.

=== Second round ===
14 April 1984 Second round	Carbery	3-05 - 1-08	Nemo Rangers	Clonakilty
	T Holland 2-1, T Murphy 1-1, M McCarthy 0-2, G Ryan 0-1.		E Fitzgerald 1-2, M Lynch 0-3, D Allen 0-1, S Hayes 0-1, T Dillon 0-1.	Referee: D Collisn (Kinsale)

15 April 1984 Second round	St. Nicholas'	3-09 - 1-05	Na Piarsaigh	Páirc Uí Chaoimh, Cork
	P Long 2-5, J Buckley 1-1, T Mulcahy 0-2, K O'Shea 0-1.		Jim O'Sullivan 1-1, John O'Sullivan 0-2, G Rea 0-1, J O'Connor 0-1.	Referee: E Porter (Brian Dillons)

27 April 1984 Second round	Carrigdhoun	3-05 - 4-09	University College Cork	Páirc Mac Gearailt, Fermoy
	J O'Callaghan 1-1, E Hanley 1-1, S Timmons 1-0, D O'Donovan 0-2, B Foley 0-1.		C O'Neill 3-3, M O'Sullivan 1-0, M O'Neill 0-2, I Conroy 0-1, TJ O'Sullivan 0-1, S Liston 0-1, M Keating 0-1.

28 April 1984 Second round	St. Finbarr's	2-14 - 1-06	Macroom	Ovens
	M Healy 1-2, D Barry 0-4, D O'Mahony 1-0, F O'Mahony 0-3, K McCarthy 0-2, B Searles 0-2, J Barry-Murphy 0-1.		E Gould 1-1, L Gould 0-2, C Foley 0-1, T O'Sullivan 0-1, K Henchion 0-1.	Referee: N Hallihan (Bandon)

29 April 1984 Second round	Millstreet	0-06 - 0-10	Passage	Macroom
	A Barry 0-3, D O'Driscoll 0-1, L Buckley 0-1, N Crowley 0-1.		C O'Reilly 0-4, K O'Reilly 0-3, J O'Sullivan 0-2, G Hanley 0-1.

29 April 1984 Second round	Seandún	0-08 - 1-11	Duhallow	BIshop Casey Memorial Park, Mallow
	B Lane 0-2, D Kennedy 0-2, J Neville 0-1, M O'Regan 0-1, J Horgan 0-1, P Walsh 0-1.		N O'Connor 1-5, J Dennehy 0-3, P O'Connor 0-2, T Healy 0-1.

29 April 1984 Second round	Muskerry	1-06 - 0-13	Bantry Blues	Sam Maguire Park, Dunmanway
	JA O'Sullivan 0-4, P Barrett 1-0, T O'Reilly 0-1, M Kelleher 0-1.		P O'Driscoll 0-11, D Barron 0-1, P McCarthy 0-1.

26 May 1984 Second round	Naomh Abán	1-06 - 3-08	Imokilly	Coachford
	J Murphy 1-0, C Twomey 0-2, P Healy 0-2, J Hall 0-1, J Allen 0-1.		K Hennessy 1-1, B Lotty 1-1, T Murphy 1-1, B Aherne 0-3, S Hegarty 0-2.

=== Quarter-finals ===
23 June 1984 Quarter-final	Imokilly	2-08 - 1-08	University College Cork	O'Connell Park, Cobh
	K Hennessy 1-3, T Murphy 1-0, B Lotty 0-1, F Quill 0-1, G Glavin 0-1, T McCarthy 0-1, J Hegarty 0-1.		M O'Neill 1-1, M Keating 0-2, D McCarthy 0-2, T Mannix 0-1, D O'Donovan 0-1, C O'Neill 0-1.	Referee: M O'Flaherty

17 June 1984 Quarter-final	Passage	4-09 - 1-07	St. Nicholas	Páirc Uí Chaoimh, Cork
	J O'Sullivan 2-3, K O'Reilly 1-2, R O'Sullivan 1-0, C O'Reilly 0-2, T O'Neill 0-1, E Palmer 0-1.		D O'Donovan 1-2, P Long 0-2, K O'Shea 0-2, J McCarthy 0-1.

23 June 1984 Quarter-final	Imokilly	0-08 - 1-05	University College Cork	O'Connell Park, Cobh
	G Glavin 0-4, J Hegarty 0-1, B Ahern 0-1, K Hennessy 0-1, T McCarthy 0-1.		C O'Neill 1-2, D McCarthy 0-2, T Mannix 0-1.

7 July 1984 Quarter-final	Duhallow	2-11 - 1-11	Carbery	Ballyvourney
	D Kelleher 1-3, N O'Connor 0-5, G O'Sullivan 1-0, P O'Connor 0-1, D Connors 0-1, J Dennehy 0-1.		T Murphy 0-5, E Murphy 1-1, M McCarthy 0-4, T Holland 0-1.	Referee: M O'Sullivan (Inniscarra)

8 July 1984 Quarter-final	St. Finbarr's	1-11 - 0-05	Bantry Blues	Rosscarbery
	K McCarthy 0-6, F O'Mahony 1-0, J Allen 0-2, D Barry 0-2, M Slocum 0-1.		P O'Driscoll 0-4, R Dix 0-1.

=== Semi-finals ===
8 August 1984 Semi-final	Imokilly	2-09 - 2-07	Duhallow	Mitchelstown
	T Murphy 1-3, B Ahern 1-1, J Hegarty 0-2, B Lotty 0-1, T McCarthy 0-1, L Hennessy 0-1.		N O'Connor 1-5, D Culloty 1-0, D O'Mahony 0-1, D Kelleher 0-1.

7 September 1984 Semi-final	St. Finbarr's	1-11 - 0-09	Passage	Páirc Uí Chaoimh, Cork
	D Barry 0-8, J Barry-Murphy 1-1, K McCarthy 0-1, J Allen 0-1.		K O'Reilly 0-4, C O'Reilly 0-1, E Palmer 0-1, T O'Neill 0-1, J Murphy 0-1, R o'Sullivan 0-1.

=== Final ===
14 October 1984 Final	Imokilly	1-14 - 2-07	St. Finbarr's	Páirc Uí Chaoimh, Cork
	B Ahern 0-7, G Glavin 1-3, T McCarthy 0-2, F Quill 0-1, B Lotty 0-1.		T Leahy 1-2, K McCarthy 1-1, J Allen 0-2, J Barry-Murphy 0-1, M Slocum 0-1.	Referee: D O'Connor

== Championship statistics ==
=== Top scorers ===
Overall

Rank	Player	Club	Tally	Total	Matches	Average
1	Niall O'Connor	Duhallow	2-17	23	4	5.75
2	Tadhg Murphy	Imokilly	5-05	20	6	3.66
2	Dave Barry	St. Finbarr's	0-20	20	6	3.66
4	Colm O'Neill	UCC	4-06	18	3	6.00
5	Kevin O'Reilly	Passage	1-14	17	4	4.25
5	Billy Ahern	Imokilly	1-14	17	5	3.40
7	Pat O'Driscoll	Bantry Blues	0-15	15	2	7.50
8	Kieran McCarthy	St. Finbarr's	1-11	14	5	2.80
9	Philip Long	St. Nicholas'	2-07	13	2	6.50
10	Ger Glavin	Imokilly	1-09	12	5	2.40

In a single game

Rank	Player	Club	Tally	Total	Opposition
1	Colm O'Neill	UCC	3-03	12	Carrigdhoun
2	Philip Long	St. Nicholas'	2-05	11	Na Piarsaigh
2	Pat O'Driscoll	Bantry Blues	0-11	11	Muskerry
4	Jim O'Sullivan	Passage	2-03	9	St. Nicholas'
5	Eoin O'Mahony	Clonakilty	1-05	8	Millstreet
5	Niall O'Connor	Duhallow	1-05	8	Seandún
5	Niall O'Connor	Duhallow	1-05	8	Imokilly
5	Dave Barry	St. Finbarr's	0-08	8	Passage
9	Tadhg Murphy	Imokilly	2-01	7	Bishopstown
9	Teddy Holland	Carbery	2-01	7	Nemo Rangers
9	Billy Ahern	Imokilly	0-07	7	St. Finbarr's

=== Miscellaneous ===
- Imokilly win their first football title.
