= 1973 All-Ireland Minor Hurling Championship =

All-Ireland Minor Hurling Championship 1973
All Ireland Champions
- Winners: Kilkenny (9th win)
- Captain: Kevin Robinson

All Ireland Runners-up
- Runners-up: Galway
- Captain: John Dervan

Provincial Champions
- Munster: Tipperary
- Leinster: Kilkenny
- Ulster: Not Played
- Connacht: Not Played

The 1973 All-Ireland Minor Hurling Championship was the 43rd staging of the All-Ireland Minor Hurling Championship since its establishment by the Gaelic Athletic Association in 1928.

Kilkenny entered the championship as the defending champions.

The All-Ireland final was played at Croke Park in Dublin on 2 September 1973 between Kilkenny and Galway, in what was their second All-Ireland final meeting overall and a first meeting in 43 years. Kilkenny won the match by 4-04 to 3-07 to claim their ninth All-Ireland title overall and a second title insuccession.

== Leinster Minor Hurling Championship ==
=== Leinster first round ===
29 April 1973 First round	Dublin	2-13 - 4-04	Laois	Dr Cullen Park
	P Byrne 2-0, B Carlon 0-5, A English 0-4, T Johnson 0-2, W Fleming 0-1, M O'Neill 0-1.		T Flynn 2-0, M Cuddy 1-1, L Cushen 1-0, P Dunphy 0-1, M Dunphy 0-1, L Harvey 0-1.

13 May 1973 First round	Offaly	2-13 - 1-03	Kildare	O'Moore Park
	G Wynne 1-3, J Flannery 1-3, E Martin 0-3, P Delaney 0-2, G Leonard 0-1, D Devery 0-1.		P Archbold 1-1, T Waters 0-2.

=== Leinster semi-finals ===
24 June 1973 Semi-final	Kilkenny	3-08 - 0-07	Dublin	Nowlan Park
	K Fennelly 1-4, P Mulhall 1-2, M Lyng 1-0, B Waldron 0-1, M Lanigan 0-1.		A English 0-2, L Walsh 0-2, T Johnston 0-2, R Deavy 0-1.

1 July 1973 Semi-final	Wexford	2-10 - 2-08	Offaly	Croke Park
	P Murphy 2-1, D Rowesome 0-3, D O'Connor 0-2, J Doyle 0-2, P Kinsella 0-1, J Moynihan 0-1.		P Kennedy 1-0, G Leonard 1-0, E Martin 0-3, J Flannery 0-2, P Delaney 0-1, B Brady 0-1, D Devery 0-1.

=== Leinster final ===
8 July 1973 Final	Kilkenny	3-10 - 2-09	Wexford	Croke Park
	K Fennelly 2-2, J Mulcahy 1-1, B Waldron 0-3, J Hennessy 0-1, K Robinson 0-1, P Treacy 0-1, M Lyng 0-1.		D O'Donnell 1-6, P Codd 1-0, J Doyle 0-2, P Kinsella 0-1.

== Munster Minor Hurling Championship ==
=== Munster first round ===
19 May 1973 First round	Kerry	2-03 - 6-12	Limerick	Austin Stack Park
	W Harrington 1-1, M Murphy 1-0, S Carroll 0-1, J McElligott 0-1.		E Barry 1-4, B Berkery 2-0, T Ryan 1-2, J Flanagan 1-1, J Moloney 1-0, P Kelly 0-3, B Flynn 0-2.

20 May 1973 First round	Tipperary	5-09 - 2-01	Waterford	Semple Stadium
	J Hennessy 0-7, J Shoer 2-0, J Grogan 1-1, P Kirby 1-0, S Waters 1-0, P Ryan 0-1.		P Fleming 1-1, P McGovern 1-0.

=== Munster semi-finals ===
26 May 1973 Semi-final	Limerick	5-17 - 3-04	Clare	Gaelic Grounds
	S Bourke 2-2, G Moloney 2-0, B Berkery 0-5, P Kelly 1-1, E Barry 0-4, B Flynn 0-3, T Ryan 0-1, G Mullane 0-1.		P O'Connor 2-0, J Walshe 1-0, L Mannion 0-2, A Power 0-2.

1 July 1973 Semi-final	Tipperary	1-11 - 1-08	Cork	Gaelic Grounds
	S Hennessy 0-5, T Shoer 1-1, J Grogan 0-3, P Kirby 0-2.		J Crowley 1-3, T Murphy 0-1, T Cashman 0-1, J Fenton 0-1, J Murphy 0-1, T Cullinane 0-1.

=== Munster final ===
29 July 1973 Final	Tipperary	5-12 - 5-04	Limerick	Semple Stadium
	P Ryan 2-1, J Ryan 1-4, J Grogan 0-5, S Waters 1-1, T Shore 1-1.		P Kelly 2-2, B Berkery 2-0, G Moloney 1-0, E Barry 0-1, B Flynn 0-1.

== All-Ireland Minor Hurling Championship ==
=== All-Ireland semi-finals ===
5 August 1973 Semi-final	Galway	3-14 - 3-10	Tipperary	Cusack Park
	G Burke 2-0, M Hanniffy 0-6, F Power 1-2, B Kelly 0-3, E Dooley 0-1, J O'Donoghue 0-1, G Hogan 0-1.		J Grogan 1-6, B Kenny 1-0, T Shoer 1-0, S Hayes 0-1, P Kirby 0-1, J Ryan 0-1, S Hennessy 0-1.	Referee: S Rankins

19 August 1973 Semi-final	Kilkenny	5-15 - 2-03	Antrim	Croke Park
	J Lyng 0-10, P Lennon 2-1, S O'Brien 1-1, M Lyng 1-1, P Treacy 1-0, G Robinson 0-1, B Waldron 0-1.		P Boyle 1-0, P Dallat 1-0, V Dennehy 0-3.	Referee: D Ferguson (Meath)

=== All-Ireland final ===
2 September 1973 Final	Kilkenny	4-05 - 3-07	Galway	Croke Park
	S O'Brien 4-2, J Lyng 0-2, B Waldron 0-1.		F Power 2-0, G Burke 1-1, M Hanniffy 0-3, B Kelly 0-2, J Dervan 0-1.	Referee: S O'Connor (Limerick)

== Championship statistics ==
=== Top scorers ===
Rank	Player	County	Tally	Total	Matches	Average
1	John Grogan	Tipperary	2-15	21	4	5.25
2	Seán O'Brien	Kilkenny	5-03	18	4	4.50
3	Tommy Shoer	Tipperary	5-02	17	4	4.25
3	Bernard Berkery	Limerick	4-05	17	3	5.66
5	Paddy Kelly	Limerick	3-06	15	3	5.00
5	Kevin Fennelly	Kilkenny	3-06	15	2	7.50
