= 1986 All-Ireland Junior Football Championship =

All Ireland Champions
- Winners: London (6th win)
- Captain: Barry Herlihy

All Ireland Runners-up
- Runners-up: Cork

Provincial Champions
- Munster: Cork
- Leinster: Meath
- Ulster: Tyrone
- Connacht: Not Played

The 1986 All-Ireland Junior Hurling Championship was the 56th staging of the All-Ireland Junior Championship, the Gaelic Athletic Association's second tier Gaelic football championship.

Galway were the defending champions, however, they surrendered their title when the Connacht Junior Championship was suspended.

The All-Ireland final was played on 19 October 1986 at the Emerald GAA Grounds in Ruislip, between London and Cork, in what was their first meeting in the final in 20 years. London won the match by 1–09 to 0–07 to claim their sixth championship title overall and a first title in 15 years.

== Results ==
=== All-Ireland Junior Football Championship ===
==== All-Ireland semi-final ====
3 July 1986 Semi-final	Tyrone	1–05 – 3–06	Cork	Healy Park

==== All-Ireland home final ====
24 August 1986 Home final	Cork	0–09 – 1–06	Meath	Croke Park

6 September 1986 Home final replay	Cork	0–11 – 1–04	Meath	O'Moore Park

==== All-Ireland final ====
19 October 1986 Final	London	1–09 – 0–07	Cork	Emerald GAA Grounds
