= 1974 All-Ireland Minor Hurling Championship =

All-Ireland Minor Hurling Championship 1974
Championship Details
- Dates: 19 May 1974 – 1 September 1974
- Teams: 13

All Ireland Champions
- Winners: Cork (12th win)
- Captain: Billy Geaney

All Ireland Runners-up
- Runners-up: Kilkenny
- Captain: John Marnell

Provincial Champions
- Munster: Cork
- Leinster: Kilkenny
- Ulster: Not Played
- Connacht: Not Played

Championship Statistics
- Top Scorer: Tadhg Murphy (4-24)

The 1974 All-Ireland Minor Hurling Championship was the 44th staging of the All-Ireland Minor Hurling Championship since its establishment by the Gaelic Athletic Association in 1928. The championship began on 19 May 1974 and ended on 1 September 1974.

Kilkenny entered the championship as the defending champions.

On 1 September 1974, Cork won the championship following a 1-10 to 1-8 defeat of Kilkenny in the All-Ireland final. This was their 12th All-Ireland title overall and their first title since 1971.

Cork's Tadhg Murphy was the championship's top scorer with 4-24.

== Results ==
=== Leinster Minor Hurling Championship ===
Quarter-finals

27 June 1974 Quarter-final	Wexford	5-08 - 2-05	Laois	Nowlan Park, Kilkenny
	PJ Codd 4-0, R Rackard 1-1, D O'Connor 0-4, M Rossiter 0-2, D Rowesome 0-1.		M Ahearne 1-0, T Flynn 1-0, C Wall 0-2, M Cuddy 0-2, M Kelly 0-1.

Semi-finals

3 July 1974 Semi-final	Offaly	1-04 - 2-08	Dublin	O'Moore Park, Portlaoise
	D Nolan 1-1, B Brady 0-2, T Kinsella 0-1.		A English 0-6, M Morris 1-0, M O'Neill 1-0, M Scollard 0-1, L Walsh 0-1.	Referee: J Rankins (Laois)

11 July 1974 Semi-final	Kilkenny	5-18 - 3-08	Wexford	Dr. Cullen Park, Carlow
	G Tyrrell 3-0, G Devane 1-5, B Fennelly 0-7, A O'Driscoll 1-1, J Ryan 0-2, M Lyng 0-1, J Walsh 0-1, K Brennan 0-1.		PJ Codd 2-0, D Rowesome 0-6, J Dillon 1-1, J Neylor 0-1.

Final

21 July 1974 Final	Kilkenny	8-19 - 3-05	Dublin	Croke Park, Dublin
	B Fennelly 3-4, G Tyrrell 2-2, A O'Driscoll 2-1, M Lyng 1-2, B Waldron 0-5, J Walsh 0-2, K Brennan 0-2, P Lannon 0-1.		L Walsh 1-1, M Morris 1-0, B Carton 1-0, A English 0-3, R Deevey 0-1.	Referee: J Rankin (Laois)

=== Munster Minor Hurling Championship ===
First round

19 May 1974 First round	Kerry	1-05 - 3-11	Clare	Ballyduff
	S Carroll 1-1, P Bunyan 0-2, J O'Sullivan 0-1, W Allen 0-1.		E Considine 2-2, J Pyne 1-1, D Hassett 0-7, P Hassett 0-1.

19 May 1974 First round	Waterford	1-03 - 6-14	Cork	Walsh Park, Waterford
	T Shanahan 1-0, S Twomey 0-1, L Reide 0-1, M Coady 0-1.		T Murphy 2-3, D Keane 1-5, D Buckley 1-3, T Cashman 1-2, T Cullinane 1-1.	Referee: J Quaid (Limerick)

Semi-finals

29 June 1974 Semi-final	Cork	3-15 - 2-06	Limerick	Semple Stadium, Thurles
	T Murphy 0-8, D Buckley 1-3, D Murphy 1-1, T Cullinane 0-1, F Delaney 0-1, R O'Mahony 0-1.		P Dowling 2-2, K Canty 0-4.	Referee: N Dalton (Waterford)

7 July 1974 Semi-final	Tipperary	4-19 - 3-05	Clare	Semple Stadium, Thurles
	J Grogan 1-8, D Whelan 1-4, P Queally 1-2, T Sheppard 1-1, S Burke 0-3, S Hennessy 0-1.		S Heaslip 1-1, P Morey 1-0, A Power 1-0, G Pyne 0-2, D Hassett 0-2.

Finals

28 July 1974 Final	Tipperary	2-10 - 3-07	Cork	Semple Stadium, Thurles
	J Grogan 2-3, S Hennessy 0-4, S Byrne 0-2, T Cullagh 0-1.		T Murphy 1-1, F Delaney 0-4, D Buckley 1-0, D Keane 1-0, D Murphy 0-1, R O'Mahony 0-1.	Referee: N Dalton (Waterford)

18 August 1974 Final replay	Tipperary	2-07 - 2-11	Cork	Fraher Field, Dungarvan
	P Queally 2-2, J Grogan 0-2, D Whelan 0-2, S Hennessy 0-1.		D Buckley 2-1, T Murphy 0-6, J Crowley 0-1, R O'Mahony 0-1, D Murphy 0-1, F Delaney 0-1.	Referee: N Dalton (Waterford)

=== All-Ireland Minor Hurling Championship ===
Quarter-final

7 July 1974 Quarter-final	Galway	7-15 - 6-04	Antrim	Páirc Chiaráin, Athlone
	V Hanley 4-0, J Connolly 1-5, B Kelly 1-5, B Forde 1-2, G Lohan 0-2, G Kennedy 0-1.		B McAuley 3-1, V Denney 1-3, P Boyle 1-0, P Dallett 1-0.

Semi-final

4 August 1974 Semi-final	Kilkenny	8-18 - 2-09	Galway	St. Brendan's Park, Birr
	B Waldron 1-7, J Walsh 2-3, B Fennelly 2-2, T O'Driscoll 2-0, G Tyrrell 1-2, T Lennon 0-2, M Lyng 0-1, N Kennedy 0-1.		B Kelly 2-5, J Connolly 0-2, A Brennan 0-1, A Barrett 0-1.	Referee: S O'Grady (Limerick)

Final

1 September 1974 Final	Cork	1-10 - 1-08	Kilkenny	Croke Park, Dublin
	T Murphy 1-6, D Buckley 0-2, T Cullinane 0-1, D Ryan 0-1.		B Waldron 1-1, K Brennan 0-4, B Fennelly 0-2, G Devane 0-1.	Referee: M Spain (Offaly)

== Championship statistics ==
=== Top scorers ===
Top scorers overall

Rank	Player	Club	Tally	Total	Matches	Average
1	Tadhg Murphy	Cork	4-24	36	5	7.20
2	Brendan Fennelly	Kilkenny	5-15	30	4	7.50
3	Danny Buckley	Cork	5-09	24	5	4.80
4	Ger Tyrrell	Kilkenny	6-04	22	4	5.50
4	John Grogan	Tipperary	3-13	22	3	7.33
