= 1977 All-Ireland Under-21 Hurling Championship =

All-Ireland Under-21 Hurling Championship 1977
All Ireland Champions
- Winners: Kilkenny (3rd win)
- Captain: Mickey Lyng

All Ireland Runners-up
- Runners-up: Cork
- Captain: Tom Lyons

Provincial Champions
- Munster: Cork
- Leinster: Kilkenny
- Ulster: Down
- Connacht: Not Played

The 1977 All-Ireland Under-21 Hurling Championship was the 14th staging of the All-Ireland Under-21 Hurling Championship since its establishment by the Gaelic Athletic Association in 1964.

Cork were the defending champions.

On 9 October 1977, Kilkenny won the championship following a 2-9 to 1-9 defeat of Cork in the All-Ireland final. This was their third All-Ireland title in the under-21 grade and their first in two championship seasons.

== Results ==
=== Leinster Under-21 Hurling Championship ===
Final

| 28 July 1977 Final | Kilkenny | 3-11 - 1-10 | Wexford | Dr. Cullen Park, Carlow |
| | B Fennelly 2-6, G Tyrrell 1-1, M Kennedy 0-1, D O'Hara 0-1, J Wall 0-1, R Power 0-1. | | J Houlihan 0-5, S O'Connor 1-1, J Walker 0-1, B O'Connor 0-1, J Conran 0-1, J Barron 0-1. | Referee: G Kirwan (Offaly) |

=== Munster Under-21 Hurling Championship ===
First round

| 13 April 1977 First round | Cork | 4-12 - 0-07 | Clare | FitzGerald Park, Kilmallock |
| | G McEvoy 2-2, P Horgan 1-1, T O'Neill 1-1, C Brassil 0-2, D Ryan 0-2, D o'Herlihy 0-1, R McDonnell 0-1, D Buckley 0-1, T Cashman 0-1. | | P Morey 0-2, M Waters 0-2, D Hassett 0-1, M Nugent 0-1, C Finucane 0-1. | Referee: J Landers (Waterford) |

| 17 April 1977 First round | Waterford | 1-10 - 4-14 | Limerick | Walsh Park, Waterford |
| | D Fitzpatrick 0-4, D Connors 1-0, J O'Regan 0-3, S Twomey 0-1, R Walsh 0-1, N Connors 0-1. | | T Dunne 2-4, P Dowling 2-0, C Keating 0-4, J Carroll 0-3, M Carroll 0-2, E Barry 0-1. |

Semi-finals

| 16 July 1977 Semi-final | Kerry | 0-04 - 7-12 | Limerick | Gaelic Park, Ballyduff |
| | W Allen 0-2, P McMahon 0-1, S Carroll 0-1. | | T Dunne 2-5, D Keating 2-1, J Carroll 1-1, C Keating 1-1, M Carroll 1-1, D Punch 0-1, MJ Coffey 0-1, P Dowling 0-1. | Referee: D O'Connor (Cork) |

| 21 July 1977 Semi-final | Cork | 3-11 - 3-06 | Tipperary | Páirc Uí Chaoimh, Cork |
| | T Murphy 1-4, D Ryan 1-1, D Buckley 1-1, T O'Neill 0-2, C Brassil 0-1, P Horgan 0-1, T Lyons 0-1. | | M Doyle 2-0, P Queally 1-0, P Ryan 0-2, T Sheppard 0-1, J Grogan 0-1, S Burke 0-1, J Hogan 0-1. | Referee: J Landers (Waterford) |

Final

| 27 July 1977 Final | Limerick | 1-08 - 5-09 | Cork | FitzGerald Park, Kilmallock |
| | E Barry 1-0, D Punch 0-2, T Dunne 0-2, D Keating 0-2, J Carroll 0-1, P Dowling 0-1. | | D Buckley 1-2, T Murphy 1-2, T O'Neill 1-1, R McDonnell 1-1, T Lyons 1-0, F Delaney 0-1, D Ryan 0-1, P Horgan --1. |

=== All-Ireland Under-21 Hurling Championship ===
Semi-finals

| 11 September 1977 Semi-final | Kilkenny | 4-19 - 1-02 | Down | Nowlan Park, Kilkenny |
| | B Fennelly 2-5, B Waldron 1-5, J Wall 1-2, P Lannon 0-2, K Brennan 0-2, J Hennessy 0-1, R Power 0-1, M Lyng 0-1. | | P Dorrigan 1-0, B Mullan 0-1, K Ennis 0-1. | Referee: D Nealon (Tipperary) |

| 11 September 1977 Semi-final | Galway | 0-05 - 1-18 | Cork | Duggan Park, Ballinasloe |
| | G Kennedy 0-2, J Connolly 0-2, S Mahon 0-1. | | R McDonnell 1-4, T Murphy 0-6, D Keane 0-3, T O'Neill 0-2, T Cashman 0-1, D O'Herlihy 0-1, P Horgan 0-1. | Referee: J Rankins (Laois) |

Final

| 9 October 1977 Final | Kilkenny | 2-09 - 1-09 | Cork | Semple Stadium, Thurles |
| | B Fennelly 1-2, B Waldron 0-5, R Power 1-0, P Lannon 0-1, K Brennan 0-1. | | T Lyons 1-1, T Murphy 0-3, T Cashman 0-2, J Crowley 0-1, P Horgan 0-1, R McDonnell 0-1. | Attendance: 15,000; Referee: J Rankins (Laois) |
