= 1976 All-Ireland Under-21 Hurling Championship =

All-Ireland Under-21 Hurling Championship 1976
All Ireland Champions
- Winners: Cork (7th win)
- Captain: Tadhg Murphy

All Ireland Runners-up
- Runners-up: Kilkenny

Provincial Champions
- Munster: Cork
- Leinster: Kilkenny
- Ulster: Antrim
- Connacht: Not Played

The 1976 All-Ireland Under-21 Hurling Championship was the 13th staging of the All-Ireland Under-21 Hurling Championship since its establishment by the Gaelic Athletic Association in 1964.

Kilkenny were the defending champions.

On 19 September 1976, Cork won the championship following a 2-17 to 1-8 defeat of Kilkenny in the All-Ireland final. This was their 7th All-Ireland title in the under-21 grade and their first in three championship seasons.

== Results ==
=== Leinster Under-21 Hurling Championship ===
Final

| 28 July 1976 Final | Kilkenny | 3-21 - 0-05 | Wexford | Dr. Cullen Park, Carlow |
| | J Lyng 1-11, P Treacy 2-0, K Brennan 0-4, B Fennelly 0-2, H Ryan 0-1, P Mulhall 0-1, M Kennedy 0-1, O Bergin 0-1. | | S O'Connor 0-2, D Rowesome 0-2, J Doyle 0-1. | Referee: G Kirwan (Offaly) |

=== Munster Under-21 Hurling Championship ===
First round

| 23 April 1976 First round | Kerry | 0-04 - 1-14 | Tipperary | Austin Stack Park, Tralee |
| | S Carroll 0-2, S Flaherty 0-1, P McMahon 0-1. | | | Referee: S O'Grady (Limerick) |

| 27 April 1976 First round | Clare | 2-17 - 4-07 | Waterford | Canon Hayes Park, Bansha |
| | P O'Connor 1-9, J Callanan 1-3, D Hassett 0-2, S Moloney 0-2, B Madden 0-1. | | D Fitzpatrick 1-6, T Maher 1-0, D Heffernan 1-0, P Daly 1-0, P O'Mara 0-1. | Referee: J Moloney (Tipperary) |

Semi-finals

| 21 April 1976 Semi-final | Cork | 3-12 - 2-06 | Limerick | The Mardyke, Cork |
| | T Murphy 0-6, P Horgan 1-1, M McDonnell 1-1, J Gardiner 1-0, J Fenton 0-3, J Crowley 0-1. | | P Kelly 0-4, B Berkerry 1-0, J Kiely 1-0, M Carroll 0-1, B Flynn 0-1. |

| 14 May 1976 Semi-final | Clare | 2-13 - 3-05 | Tipperary | Cusack Park, Ennis |
| | | | | Referee: S O'Grady (Limerick) |

Final

| 14 July 1976 Final | Cork | 2-11 - 3-06 | Clare | Gaelic Grounds, Limerick |
| | T Murphy 1-4, P Horgan 1-2, J Allen 0-2, D Buckley 0-1, S O'Mahony 0-1, K Murphy 0-1. | | B Gilligan 2-2, P Hehir 1-0, G O'Connor 0-2, J Callanan 0-2. | Referee: S O'Grady (Limerick) |

=== All-Ireland Under-21 Hurling Championship ===
Semi-finals

| 25 July 1976 Semi-final | Cork | 1-16 - 2-06 | Galway | Páirc Uí Chaoimh, Cork |
| | T Murphy 0-5, J Allen 0-4, J McCarthy 1-0, P Horgan 0-3, D Buckley 0-1, R McDonnell 0-1, R O'Mahony 0-1, C Brassil 0-1. | | J Connolly 1-6, F Power 1-0. |

| 1 August 1976 Semi-final | Antrim | 1-08 - 4-15 | Kilkenny | Casement Park, Belfast |
| | P Boyle 0-4, M Darragh 1-0, P McFall 0-2, M Delargy 0-1, E Lavery 0-1. | | K Brennan 2-8, J Lyng 1-3, M Lyng 1-0, O Bergin 0-3, P Mulhall 0-1. | Referee: T Furlong (Dublin) |

Final

| 19 September 1976 Final | Cork | 2-17 - 1-08 | Kilkenny | Walsh Park, Waterford |
| | P Horgan 1-5, T Murphy 0-6, K Murphy 1-1, D Buckley 0-2, R McDonnell 0-1, C Brassil 0-1, J Fenton 0-1. | | J Lyng 0-6, B Fennelly 1-0, J Hennessy 0-1, M Brennan 0-1. | Referee: G Kirwan (Offaly) |
