= 1975 All-Ireland Under-21 Hurling Championship =

All-Ireland Under-21 Hurling Championship 1975
Championship Details
- Dates: 9 April 1975 - 12 October 1975
- Teams: 15

All Ireland Champions
- Winners: Kilkenny (2nd win)
- Captain: Kevin Fennelly

All Ireland Runners-up
- Runners-up: Cork
- Captain: Frank O'Sullivan

Provincial Champions
- Munster: Cork
- Leinster: Kilkenny
- Ulster: Down
- Connacht: Not Played

Championship Statistics
- Top Scorer: Éamonn O'Sullivan (4-09)

The 1975 All-Ireland Under-21 Hurling Championship was the 12th staging of the All-Ireland Under-21 Hurling Championship since its establishment by the Gaelic Athletic Association in 1964. The championship began on 9 April 1975 and ended on 12 October 1975.

Kilkenny entered the championship as the defending champions.

On 12 October 1975, Kilkenny won the championship following a 5-13 to 2-19 defeat of Cork in the All-Ireland final. This was their second All-Ireland title overall and their second title in succession.

Cork's Éamonn O'Sullivan was the championship's top scorer with 4-09.

== Results ==
=== Leinster Under-21 Hurling Championship ===
Quarter-finals

25 May 1975 Quarter-final	Meath	3-12 - 2-06	Offaly	St. Loman's Park, Trim
	C Sheridan 1-5, M Dempsey 1-3, B Smyth 1-3, P Kelly 0-1.

8 June 1975 Quarter-final	Dublin	4-14 - 2-05	Laois	Dr. Cullen Park, Carlow
	PJ Buckley 1-2, T Ryan 0-5, J Thompson 1-0, J Hackett 1-0, B Carton 1-0, W Walsh 0-2, P Reaney 0-2, P Carton 0-1, A English 0-1, A Brown 0-1.		T Dunne 1-0, P Dunphy 1-0, P Hannon 0-3, M Brophy 0-1, M Cudd 0-1.	Referee: M Bowe (Wexford)

Semi-finals

29 June 1975 Semi-final	Wexford	6-13 - 1-03	Meath	O'Moore Park, Portlaoise
	R Kinsella 2-3, M Walsh 2-1, M Connors 1-0, J Allen 1-0, D Keogh 0-3, P Hendrick 0-3, W Rowesome 0-2, B Rowesome 0-1.		A Cassells 1-0, E Mahon 0-1, C Sheridan 0-1, J Hutton 0-1.

20 July 1975 Semi-final	Kilkenny	6-15 - 0-08	Dublin	Dr. Cullen Park, Carlow
	B Fitzpatrick 2-5, G Fennelly 1-4, G Woodcock 1-3, J Sullivan 1-3, J Lyng 1-0.		P Reaney 0-4, PJ Buckley 0-2, P Carton 0-1, L Walsh 0-1.

Final

27 July 1975 Final	Kilkenny	3-14 - 0-08	Wexford	Dr. Cullen Park, Carlow
	M Tierney 1-4, B Sweeney 1-2, J Dowling 1-0, B Fitzpatrick 0-3, G Woodcock 0-3, J Lyng 0-2, G Fennelly 0-2.		R Kinsella 0-5, N Walsh 0-1, S Murphy 0-1, M O'Connor 0-1.	Referee: G Rankin (Laois)

=== Munster Under-21 Hurling Championship ===
First round

9 April 1975 First round	Kerry	2-02 - 3-08	Cork	Kenmare
	J O'Sullivan 1-1, M O'Halloran 1-0, S Flaherty 0-1.		T Collins 1-1, T Murphy 0-4, S O'Farrell 1-0, E O'Sullivan 1-0, B Óg Murphy 0-2, R Fitzgerald 0-1.

16 April 1975 First round	Tipperary	1-07 - 2-07	Clare	Leahy Park, Cashel
	S Maher 1-0, P McCormack 0-3, S Hennessy 0-2, J Bergin 0-1, G Hayes 0-1,		B Gilligan 1-3, D Hassett 1-2, V Daly 0-1, J Boyce 0-1.	Referee: S O'Grady (Limerick)

Semi-finals

30 April 1975 Semi-final	Cork	4-10 - 1-03	Clare	FitzGerald Park, Kilmallock
	J Barry-Murphy 2-2, E O'Sullivan 1-3, T Murphy 0-4, T Collins 1-0, K Keane 0-1.		M Madden 1-0, G O'Connor 0-1, P O'Connor 0-1, G Pyne 0-1,	Referee: S O'Grady (Limerick)

2 May 1975 Semi-final	Waterford	2-11 - 3-08	Limerick	Fraher Field, Dungarvan
	B Mansfield 1-2, J Galvin 0-4, P Moore 1-0, G Meehan 0-2, T Shanahan 0-1, S Treacy 0-1, E Ryan 0-1.		D Riordan 2-0, M Hayes 1-1, P Kelly 0-3, E Tuohy 0-3, D Punch 0-1.	Referee: J Collins (Tipperary)

16 May 1975 Semi-final replay	Limerick	5-08 - 3-05	Waterford	Gaelic Grounds, Limerick
	D O'Riordan 3-0, M Hayes 2-0, P Kelly 0-2, B Flynn 0-2, T Mulcahy 0-1, D Punch 0-1, B Berkerry 0-1, G Moloney 0-1.		J Galvin 2-0, D Fitzpatrick 0-4, T Shanahan 1-0, B Mansfield 0-1.

Final

15 July 1975 Final	Limerick	2-06 - 3-12	Cork	Gaelic Grounds, Limerick
	B Berkerry 1-2, D O'Riordan 1-0, P Kelly 0-2, E Tuohy 0-2.		J Barry-Murphy 2-1, E O'Sullivan 0-4, T Collins 1-0, S Farrell 0-2, B Óg Murphy 0-2, R O'Mahony 0-2, J Fenton 0-1.	Referee: M Slattery (Clare)

=== Ulster Under-21 Hurling Championship ===
Final

13 July 1975 Final	Down	3-10 - 1-03	Antrim	Mitchell Park, Ballygalget

=== All-Ireland Under-21 Hurling Championship ===
Semi-finals

17 August 1975 Semi-final	Cork	4-14 - 1-04	Down	Croke Park, Dublin
	E O'Sullivan 2-2, S O'Farrell 1-3, T Collins 1-2, B Óg Murphy 0-4, R Fitzgerald 0-2, J Gardiner 0-1.		K Conlon 1-0, B Mullan 0-3, M O'Flynn 0-1.	Referee: T Kearney (Dublin)

24 August 1975 Semi-final	Galway	2-09 - 3-13	Kilkenny	Duggan Park, Ballinasloe
	J Connolly 0-7, G Burke 2-0, G Lohan 0-1, T Murphy 0-1.		T Brennan 1-7, G Fennelly 1-2, J Lyng 0-4, B Sweeney 1-0.	Referee: S O'Connor (Limerick)

Final

12 October 1975 Final	Kilkenny	5-13 - 2-19	Cork	Fraher Field, Dungarvan
	T Brennan 2-0, J Lyng 0-5, B Cody 1-1, M Tierney 1-1, B Sweeney 1-1, G Fennelly 0-3, B Fitzpatrick 0-2.		J Fenton 0-9, B Óg Murphy 0-7, S Farrell 1-2, T o'Sullivan 1-0, F Delaney 0-1.	Referee: S O'Meara (Tipperary)

== Championship statistics ==
=== Top scorers ===
Overall

Rank	Player	County	Tally	Total	Matches	Average
1	Éamonn O'Sullivan	Cork	4-09	21	5	4.25
2	David O'Riordan	Limerick	6-00	18	3	6.00
3	Ger Fennelly	Kilkenny	2-11	17	4	4.25
4	Seán O'Farrell	Cork	3-07	16	5	3.20
4	Terry Brennan	Kilkenny	3-07	16	4	4.00
4	Billy Fitzpatrick	Kilkenny	2-10	16	4	4.00
5	Jimmy Barry-Murphy	Cork	4-03	15	5	3.00
5	Tom Collins	Cork	4-03	15	5	3.00
5	Bertie Óg Murphy	Cork	0-15	15	5	3.00
