= Lester Ryan =

Irish hurler (1959–2020)

Personal information
- Native name: Lester Ó Riain (Irish)
- Born: 18 April 1959 Clara, County Kilkenny, Ireland
- Died: 6 June 2020 (aged 61) Gowran, County Kilkenny, Ireland
- Occupation: Sales clerk
- Height: 5 ft 9 in (175 cm)

Sport
- Sport: Hurling
- Position: Midfield
Club
- Years: Club
- Clara
Club titles
- Kilkenny titles: 1
Inter-county
Years	County	Apps (scores)
1983–1991	Kilkenny	16 (4–11)
Inter-county titles
- Leinster titles: 3
- All-Irelands: 0
- NHL: 3
- All Stars: 0

Lester Ryan (18 April 1959 – 6 June 2020) was an Irish hurler who played as a midfielder at club level with Clara and at inter-county level with the Kilkenny senior hurling team. His brother, Harry Ryan, and his nephew, Lester Ryan, were All-Ireland Championship-winners with Kilkenny.

== Playing career ==
=== St. Kieran's College ===
As a student at St. Kieran's College in Kilkenny, Ryan played hurling at all levels before being added to the college's senior team. He was just 15-years-old when he claimed a Leinster Colleges Championship title as a non-playing substitute in 1975, after a 6–12 to 4–03 victory over Birr's Presentation College. Ryna later claimed an All-Ireland Colleges Championship medal after coming on as a substitute in the 6–09 to 2–03 defeat of Coláiste Iognáid Rís in the All-Ireland final.

=== Clara ===
Ryan was still eligible for the minor grade when he was first selected to play at adult level with the Clara junior hurling team. He claimed his first silverware as a non-playing substitute in 1977 when Clara defeated Tullogher by 3–12 to 2–04 to win the Kilkenny Junior Championship. After claiming an under-21 championship medal in 1979, Ryan lined out in his first adult county final in 1982 when Clara faced Carrickshock in the Kilkenny Intermediate Championship final. He ended the game with a winners' medal after playing at midfield in the 0–13 to 0–09 victory.

After four years in the Kilkenny Senior Championship, Clara qualified to meet Ballyhale Shamrocks in the 1986 final. Ryan scored four points from frees and claimed a winners' medal after the 3–10 to 4–05 victory. He lined out in a second senior decider when Clara faced Glenmore in the 1990 final but ended the game on the losing side after a 3–15 to 2–06 defeat.

=== Kilkenny ===
==== Minor and under-21 ====
Ryan first played for Kilkenny when he was drafted onto the minor team alongside his brother Harry in advance of the 1975 Leinster Minor Championship. In his debut season, he claimed a Leinster Minor Championship as a substitute after a 2–18 to 3–04 defeat of Dublin in the final before later winning an All-Ireland Minor Championship medal after again lining out as a substitute in the 3–19 to 1–14 victory over Cork. Ryan collected a second successive Leinster Minor Championship medal as a non-playing substitute in 1976, however, Kilkenny suffered a 2–20 to 1–07 defeat by Tipperary in the subsequent All-Ireland final. Eligible for the minor team for a third successive season, he broke onto the starting fifteen as first-choice goalkeeper for the 1977 Leinster Minor Championship. Ryan collected his third provincial winners' medal, his first on the field of play, before later winning a second All-Ireland medal after the 1–08 to 0-09 All-Ireland final defeat of Cork in what was his last game in the minor grade.

Ryan was in his final year of being eligible for the Kilkenny under-21 team when he was appointed captain in advance of the 1980 Leinster Under-21 Championship. He won his only Leinster Under-21 Championship title that year after a 2–14 to 2–09 defeat of Wexford in the final. Ryan later led the team to an All-Ireland final appearance against Tipperary, however, he ended his underage career with a 2–09 to 0–14 defeat.

==== Senior ====
After success at club level with Clara, Ryan was a late addition to the Kilkenny senior panel during the 1982-83 National League. He was an unused substitute when Kilkenny secured the league title after a 2–14 to 2–12 defeat of Limerick in the final but was dropped from the panel for the subsequent championship campaign. After being again omitted from the panel the following year, Ryan impressed in a series of tournament games and earned a recall prior to the start of the 1985 Leinster Championship. He made his championship debut on 26 May 1985 when he came on as a 52nd-minute substitute for Richie Power in a 1–30 to 1–10 defeat of Westmeath.

Ryan broke onto the starting fifteen during the 1985-86 National League and claimed a second winners' medal in that competition after Kilkenny's 2–10 to 2–06 victory over Galway in the final. He later won his first Leinster Championship medal after lining out at right corner-forward in the 4–10 to 1–11 victory over Offaly. Ryan was switched to midfield the following year and claimed a second successive Leinster Championship medal after a second successive victory over Offaly in the 1987 Leinster final. He was again at midfield when Kilkenny suffered a 1–12 to 0–09 defeat by Galway in the 1987 All-Ireland final.

Ryan claimed a third National League medal after Kilkenny clinched the 1989-90 title following wins over Wexford and New York. By the start of the 1991 Leinster Championship, he had lost his place on the starting fifteen, however, he collected a third provincial winners' medal after coming on as a substitute for Richie Power in the 1–13 to 1-11 Leinster final victory over Dublin. Ryan was an unused substitute when Kilkenny suffered a 1–16 to 0–15 defeat by Tipperary in the 1991 ALl-Ireland final in what was his last appearance for the team.

=== Leinster ===
Ryan's performances at inter-county level saw him secure selection for the Leinster inter-provincial team. He claimed his sole Railway Cup medal after lining out at midfield in Leinster's 2–14 to 1–12 victory over Connacht in the 1988 final.

== Coaching career ==
Ryan, who previously worked as a car salesman, worked in an official capacity as a coaching officer with the Leinster Council. In 2008 he served as manager of the Ireland national hurling team and guided them to a 1–10 to 1–09 victory over Scotland in the annual Shinty-Hurling International Series.

== Death ==
On 6 June 2020, Ryan died in a traffic collision when his bicycle collided with a tractor in Gowran, County Kilkenny, aged 61.

== Honours ==
=== Player ===
St. Kieran's College

- All-Ireland Colleges Senior Hurling Championship (1): 1977
- Leinster Colleges Senior Hurling Championship (1): 1977

Clara

- Kilkenny Senior Hurling Championship (1): 1986
- Kilkenny Intermediate Hurling Championship (1): 1982
- Kilkenny Junior Hurling Championship (1): 1977

Kilkenny

- Leinster Senior Hurling Championship (3): 1986, 1987, 1991
- National Hurling League (3): 1982-83, 1985-86, 1989-90
- Leinster Under-21 Hurling Championship (1): 1980
- All-Ireland Minor Hurling Championship (2): 1975, 1977
- All-Ireland Minor Hurling Championship (3): 1975, 1976, 1977

Leinster

- Railway Cup (1): 1988

=== Manager ===
Ireland

- Shinty-Hurling International Series (1): 2008
