= Shane Prendergast =

Irish hurler

Personal information
- Native name: Seán de Priondras (Irish)
- Born: 1986 (age 39–40) Clara, County Kilkenny, Ireland
- Occupation: Primary school teacher
- Height: 6 ft 1 in (185 cm)

Sport
- Sport: Hurling
- Position: Left corner-back
Club
- Years: Club
- Clara
Club titles
- Kilkenny titles: 2
Inter-county*
| Years | County | Apps (scores) |
| 2014-2017 | Kilkenny | 7 (0-00) |
Inter-county titles
- Leinster titles: 2
- All-Irelands: 1
- NHL: 0
- All Stars: 0
- *Inter County team apps and scores correct as of 13:02, 3 November 2017.

Shane Prendergast (born 1986) is an Irish hurler who plays as a left corner-back for the Kilkenny senior team.

Born in Clara, County Kilkenny, Prendergast was introduced to hurling by his father, Paddy Prendergast, a three-time All-Ireland medal winner. He enjoyed All-Ireland success at colleges level with St. Kieran's College while simultaneously joining the Clara senior club team. An All-Ireland medal winner in the intermediate grade with Clara, Prendergast has also won two championship medals at senior level.

Prendergast made his debut on the inter-county scene at the age of seventeen when he first linked up with the Kilkenny minor team. An All-Ireland runner-up in this grade, he later won an All-Ireland medal with the intermediate team. Prendergast made his senior debut during the 2014 league. He has since gone on to play a key role for Kilkenny in defence, and has won one All-Ireland medal and one Leinster medal.

== Playing career ==
=== Club ===
Prendergast enjoyed his first success with the Clara intermediate hurling team in 2007. A 1–15 to 0–12 defeat of St. Lachtain's in the championship decider gave him his first winners' medal in that competition.

Five years later in 2012, Prendergast added a second intermediate championship medal to his collection following a 1–7 to 0–4 defeat of St. Patrick's Ballyragget. Clara subsequently faced Oylegate/Glenbrien in the provincial decider. An incredible game followed, which saw Oylgate having four men dismissed for second-yellow card offences. Clara powered to a 3–20 to 0–5 victory, with Prendergast collecting a Leinster medal. The subsequent All-Ireland decider saw Clare face London-based St. Gabriel's. Clara were convincing 1–16 to 0–11 winners, with Prendergast picking up an All-Ireland Intermediate Club Hurling Championship medal.

A year after making the step up to the top flight, Clara faced hot favourites Carrickshock in the senior championship decider in 2013. With four minutes of normal time left, Carrickshock looked the likely winners as they went two points ahead. Lester Ryan scored 1–1 in the final moments to secure a 1–15 to 2–10 victory. It was Prendergast's first championship medal in the senior grade.

=== Inter-county ===
Prendergast first came to prominence on the inter-county scene as a member of the Kilkenny minor team in 2004. He won a Leinster medal that year following a heavy 1–15 to 1–4 defeat of Dublin. The subsequent All-Ireland decider on 12 September 2004 pitted Kilkenny against Galway. Richie Hogan proved to be the hero for Kilkenny, as his point, a minute into injury time, earned "the Cats" a 1–18 to 3–12 draw. The replay a week later on 19 September 2004 was also a close affair, with Galway just about holding off the Kilkenny challenge to win by 0–16 to 1–12.

By 2008 Prendergast had joined the Kilkenny intermediate team. He won a Leinster medal that year following a 4–26 to 3-15 extra-time defeat of Dublin. On 30 August 2008 Kilkenny faced Limerick in the All-Ireland decider. A 1–16 to 0–13 victory gave Prendergast an All-Ireland Intermediate Hurling Championship medal.

Prendergast was added to the Kilkenny senior team in 2014, however, he failed to make the championship panel.

On 21 June 2015 Prendergast made his championship debut when he came on as a substitute for Jackie Tyrrell in a 5–25 to 0-16 Leinster semi-final defeat of Wexford. He later won a Leinster medal when he came on as a substitute once again in a 1–25 to 2–15 defeat of Galway. Kilkenny renewed their rivalry with Galway once again in the All-Ireland decider on 6 September 2015. The team struggled in the first half, however, a T. J. Reid goal and a dominant second half display, which limited Galway to just 1–4, saw Kilkenny power to a 1–22 to 1–18 victory. It was Prendergast's first All-Ireland medal.

== Honours ==
=== Team ===
St. Kieran's College

- All-Ireland Colleges Senior Hurling Championship (2): 2003, 2004
- Leinster Colleges Senior Hurling Championship (2): 2003, 2004

Clara

- Kilkenny Senior Club Hurling Championship (2): 2013, 2015
- All-Ireland Intermediate Club Hurling Championship (1): 2013
- Leinster Intermediate Club Hurling Championship (1): 2012
- Kilkenny Intermediate Club Hurling Championship (2): 2007, 2012

Kilkenny

- All-Ireland Senior Hurling Championship (1): 2015
- Leinster Senior Hurling Championship (2): 2015, 2016
- All-Ireland Intermediate Hurling Championship (1): 2008
- Leinster Intermediate Hurling Championship (1): 2008
- Leinster Minor Hurling Championship (1): 2004

Sporting positions
| Preceded by Joey Holden | Kilkenny Senior Hurling Captain; 2016 | Succeeded by Mark Bergin |
