= Paddy Prendergast (hurler) =

Irish hurler

Personal information
- Native name: Pádraig de Priondragás (Irish)
- Born: Patrick Prendergast; 2 February 1958 (age 68) Clara, County Kilkenny, Ireland
- Occupation: Farmer
- Height: 6 ft 0 in (183 cm)

Sport
- Sport: Hurling
- Position: Left wing-back
Club
- Years: Club
- Clara
Club titles
- Kilkenny titles: 1
Inter-county*
Years	County	Apps (scores)
1978-1987	Kilkenny	26 (0-00)
Inter-county titles
- Leinster titles: 6
- All-Irelands: 3
- NHL: 3
- All Stars: 1
- *Inter County team apps and scores correct as of 18:43, 16 June 2015.

Patrick Prendergast (born 1958) is an Irish retired hurler who played as a full-back and as a left wing-back for the Kilkenny senior team.

Born in Clara, County Kilkenny, Prendergast first played competitive hurling during his schooling at St Kieran's College. He arrived on the inter-county scene at the age of seventeen when he first linked up with the Kilkenny minor team before later joining the under-21 side. He made his senior debut during the 1978 championship. Prendergast immediately became a regular member of the team and won three All-Ireland medals, six Leinster medals, and three National Hurling League medals. He was an All-Ireland runner-up on two occasions.

As a member of the Leinster inter-provincial team on a number of occasions Prendergast won one Railway Cup medal as a non-playing substitute. At club level he is a one-time championship medallist with Clara.

Throughout his career, Prendergast made 26 championship appearances. His retirement came following the conclusion of the 1987 championship.

== Hurling career ==
=== Colleges ===
During his schooling at St. Kieran's College in Kilkenny, Prendergast established himself as a key member of the senior hurling team. In 1975 he won a Leinster medal following a 6–12 to 4–3 defeat of Presentation College from Birr. On 20 April 1975 St. Kieran's faced Colaiste Iognaid Ris from Cork in the All-Ireland decider. A huge 6–9 to 2–3 victory gave Prendergast an All-Ireland medal.

=== Club ===
Prendergast enjoyed his first success with Clara in 1982. A 0–13 to 0–9 defeat of Carrickshock secured a championship medal in the intermediate grade.

Four years later in 1986 Clara reached the senior decider where they faced reigning champions Ballyhale Shamrocks. The sides were level at half time but, in a nail-biting finish, a Joe Casey goal for Clara secured a narrow 3–10 to 4–5 victory.

=== Minor and under-21 ===
Prendergast first played for Kilkenny as a member of the minor team in 1975. A 2–18 to 3–4 defeat of Dublin secured a fifth successive provincial title for the team and a first Leinster medal for Prendergast. On 6 September 1975 Kilkenny faced Cork in the All-Ireland decider. The Cats proved much too strong and powered to a 3–19 to 1–14 victory, giving Prendergast an All-Ireland Minor Hurling Championship medal.

Kilkenny retained their provincial dominance in 1976 with Prendergast collecting a second Leinster medal following 2–15 to 1–8 defeat of Wexford. The subsequent All-Ireland decider on 5 September 1976 saw Tipperary providing the opposition. Kilkenny were completely overwhelmed by the Tipp challenge and endured a 2–20 to 1–7 defeat.

Prendergast was still only in his first season with the Kilkenny minors when he was added to the under-21 team in 1975. He was an unused substitute throughout the year, however, he did collect a set of Leinster and All-Ireland medals following Kilkenny's undefeated championship campaign.

Two tears later in 1977 Prendergast won his first Leinster medal on the field of play as Wexford were downed on a score line of 3–11 to 1–10. Cork were once again waiting for Kilkenny in the All-Ireland decider. Having been beating the previous year, the Cats made no mistake on this occasion and secured a narrow 2–9 to 1–9 victory. It was Prendergast's first All-Ireland medal on the field of play.

=== Senior ===
Prendergast made his senior championship debut on 25 June 1978 in a 2–17 to 1-4 Leinster semi-final trouncing of Offaly. Kilkenny subsequently broke Wexford's stranglehold on Leinster and secured the provincial title with a narrow 2–16 to 1–16 victory. It was Prendergast's first Leinster medal at the highest level. On 3 September 1978 Kilkenny faced Cork in the All-Ireland decider, as the Rebels were bidding to become the first team in over twenty years to secure a third championship in succession. The game was far from the classic that was expected, with the decisive score coming from Jimmy Barry-Murphy whose low shot towards goal deceived Noel Skehan and trickled over the line. The 1–15 to 2–8 score line resulted in defeat for Prendergast's side.

Prendergast won a second successive Leinster medal in 1979 as Wexford were defeated by 2–21 to 2–17. On 2 September 1979 Kilkenny faced Galway in the All-Ireland final. Bad weather and an unofficial train drivers' strike resulted in the lowest attendance at a final in over twenty years. The bad weather also affected the hurling with Kilkenny scoring two freak goals as Galway 'keeper Séamus Shinnors had a nightmare of a game. A Liam "Chunky" O’Brien 70-yard free went all the way to the net in the first half, while with just three minutes remaining a 45-yard shot from Mick Brennan was helped by the wind and dipped under the crossbar. Kilkenny won by 2–12 to 1–8 with Prendergast winning his first All-Ireland medal.

After a fallow two-year period, Kilkenny bounced back in 1982 with Prendergast winning his first National Hurling League medal following a 2–14 to 1–11 defeat of Wexford. He later added a third Leinster medal to his collection following a 1–11 to 0–12 defeat of three-in-a-row hopefuls and reigning All-Ireland champions Offaly. On 5 September 1982 Kilkenny and Cork renewed their rivalry in the All-Ireland decider. The Cats were rank outsiders on the day, however, a brilliant save by Noel Skehan was followed by two quick goals by Christy Heffernan just before the interval. Éamonn O'Donoghue pegged a goal back for Cork, however, Ger Fennelly added a third for Kilkenny who secured a 3–18 to 1–13 victory. It was a second All-Ireland medal for Prendergast while his performance throughout the championship later earned him an All-Star.

Prendergast won a second consecutive league medal in 1983 following a narrow 2–14 to 2–12 defeat of Limerick before later collecting a fourth Leinster medal as Offaly were accounted for by 1–17 to 0–13. The All-Ireland final on 4 September 1983 was a replay of the previous year with Cork hoping to avenge that defeat. Billy Fitzpatrick was the star with ten points, giving Kilkenny a 2–14 to 1–9 lead with seventeen minutes left, however, they failed to score for the remainder of the game. A stunning comeback by Cork just fell short and Prendergast collected a third All-Ireland medal following a 2–14 to 2–12 victory.

In 1986 Kilkenny bounced back with Prendergast collecting a third league medal following a 2–10 to 2–6 defeat of Galway. He later collected a fifth Leinster medal following a 4–10 to 1–11 defeat of reigning champions Offaly.

Prendergast, who was now captain of the team, won a sixth and final Leinster medal in 1987 as Offaly were downed once again by 2–14 to 0–17. On 6 September 1987 Galway, a team who were hoping to avoid becoming the first team to lose three finals in-a-row, faced a Kilkenny team who for many of its players knew it would be their last chance to claim an All-Ireland medal. Galway 'keeper John Commins saved two goal chances from Ger Fennelly, while at the other end substitute Noel Lane bagged a decisive goal as Galway claimed a 1–12 to 0–9 victory.

=== Inter-provincial ===
Prendergast also lined out with Leinster in the inter-provincial championship, however, his career coincided with a low ebb for Leinster hurling at this level. His sole triumph came in 1979, when a 1–13 to 1–9 defeat of Connacht in the decider gave him a Railway Cup medal as a non-playing substitute.

== Personal life ==
Prendergast has three sons - David, Neal and Shane. All three sons have won minor All Ireland medals for Kilkenny. Shane captained Kilkenny Senior hurling team in 2016. David has won two Dublin senior club county medals with UCD.

== Honours ==
=== Player ===
St. Kieran's College

- All-Ireland Colleges Senior Hurling Championship (1): 1975
- Leinster Colleges Senior Hurling Championship (1): 1975

Clara

- Kilkenny Senior Hurling Championship (1): 1986

Kilkenny

- All-Ireland Senior Hurling Championship (3): 1979, 1982, 1983
- Leinster Senior Hurling Championship (6): 1978, 1979, 1982, 1983, 1986, 1987 (c)
- National Hurling League (3): 1981–82, 1982–83, 1985–86
- All-Ireland Under-21 Hurling Championship (2): 1975 (sub), 1977
- Leinster Under-21 Hurling Championship (2): 1975 (sub), 1977
- All-Ireland Minor Hurling Championship (1): 1975
- Leinster Minor Hurling Championship (2): 1975, 1976

Leinster

- Railway Cup (1): 1979 (sub)

=== Individual ===
Honours

- All-Star (1): 1982

Sporting positions
Preceded by Frank Holohan	Kilkenny Senior Hurling Captain; 1987	Succeeded by Liam Walsh
