= Harry Ryan (hurler) =

Irish hurler (1957–2020)

Personal information
- Native name: Anraí Ó Riain (Irish)
- Born: 7 April 1957 Clara, County Kilkenny, Ireland
- Died: 24 November 2020 (aged 63) Kilkenny, Ireland
- Occupation: Business owner
- Height: 5 ft 7 in (170 cm)

Sport
- Sport: Hurling
- Position: Left corner-forward
Clubs
- Years: Club
- Clara; Mount Leinster Rangers
Club titles
- Kilkenny titles: 1
Inter-county
| Years | County | Apps (scores) |
| 1982–1988 | Kilkenny | 17 (4-43) |
Inter-county titles
- Leinster titles: 3
- All-Irelands: 1
- NHL: 2
- All Stars: 0

Harry Ryan (7 April 1957 – 24 November 2020) was an Irish hurler. At club level, he played with Clara and Mount Leinster Rangers and at inter-county level with the Kilkenny senior hurling team.

== Career ==
Ryan attended St Kieran's College in Kilkenny and played in all grades of hurling during his time there. As a member of the college's senior team, he won consecutive Leinster Colleges SAHC titles. Ryan also won a Dr Croke Cup medal, after lining out in the 6–09 to 2–03 win over Coláiste Iognáid Rís in the 1975 All-Ireland Colleges SAHC final.

At club level, Ryan first played hurling at juvenile and underage levels with the Clara/Bennettsbridge amalgamation that won the Kilkenny MHC title in 1974. He progressed to adult level with Clara and won a Kilkenny JHC medal in 1977, before claiming a Kilkenny IHC medal in 1982. Ryan was part of the Clara team that won the Kilkenny SHC title after beating Ballyhale Shamrocks by 3–10 to 4–05. He later lined out with the Mount Leinster Rangers club in Carlow.

At inter-county level, Ryan first appeared for Kilkenny as captain of the minor team that beat Cork by 3–19 to 1–14 in the 1975 All-Ireland MHC final. He immediately progressed to the under-21 team and won an All-Ireland U21HC medal in 1977. Ryan joined the senior team in 1982. He was part of the team that made a clean sweep of National Hurling League, leinster SHC and All-Ireland SHC titles in 1983.

Ryan claimed a second National League title in 1986, before later claiming consecutive Leinster SHC medals. He lined out at left corner-forward when Galway beat Kilkenny by 1–12 to 0–09 in the 1987 All-Ireland SHC final.

== Personal life an death ==
His brother, Lester Ryan Snr, was a contemporary on the Kilkenny senior team. His nephew, Lester Ryan Jnr, captained Kilkenny to the All-Ireland SHC title in 2014.

Ryan died at St Luke's Hospital in Kilkenny on 24 November 2020, at the age of 63.

== Honours ==
St Kieran's College

- All-Ireland Colleges Senior Hurling Championship (1): 1975
- Leinster Colleges Senior Hurling Championship (2): 1974, 1975

Clara/Bennettsbridge

- Kilkenny Minor Hurling Championship (1): 1974

Clara

- Kilkenny Senior Hurling Championship (1): 1986
- Kilkenny Intermediate Hurling Championship (1): 1982
- Kilkenny Junior Hurling Championship (1): 1977

Kilkenny

- All-Ireland Senior Hurling Championship (1): 1983
- Leinster Senior Hurling Championship (3): 1983, 1986, 1987
- National Hurling League (2): 1982-83, 1985-86
- All-Ireland Under-21 Hurling Championship (1): 1977
- Leinster Under-21 Hurling Championship (2): 1976, 1977
- All-Ireland Minor Hurling Championship (1): 1975 (c)
- Leinster Minor Hurling Championship (1): 1975 (c)

Sporting positions
| Preceded by John Marnell | Kilkenny minor hurling team captain 1975 | Succeeded by Eddie Mahon |
Achievements
| Preceded by Billy Geaney | All-Ireland MHC final winning captain 1975 | Succeeded by Joe Hogan |
