= Finbarr Sheehan =

Irish hurler

Personal information
- Native name: Fionnbarra Ó Síocháin (Irish)
- Born: 1959 (age 66–67) Inniscarra, County Cork, Ireland

Sport
- Sport: Hurling
- Position: Goalkeeper
Clubs
- Years: Club
- Inniscarra; Muskerry
Club titles
- Cork titles: 0
Inter-county*
Years	County	Apps (scores)
1980-1981	Cork	0 (0-00)
Inter-county titles
- Munster titles: 0
- All-Irelands: 0
- NHL: 1
- All Stars: 0
- *Inter County team apps and scores correct as of 21:05, 23 March 2019.

Finbarr Sheehan (born 1959) is an Irish retired hurler who played for club side Inniscarra. He played for the Cork senior hurling team for one seasons during which time he usually lined out as sub-goalkeeper to Ger Cunningham.

== Honours ==
Inniscarra

- Cork Junior Hurling Championship (1): 1975
- Mid Cork Junior A Hurling Championship (1): 1975

Cork

- National Hurling League (1): 1980-81
- Munster Minor Hurling Championship (1): 1977
