= Conor O'Shea (hurler) =

Irish hurler

Personal information
- Native name: Conchur Ó Sé (Irish)
- Born: 1993 (age 32–33) Clara, County Kilkenny, Ireland
- Occupation: Glanbia employee

Sport
- Sport: Hurling
- Position: Right wing-back
Club
- Years: Club
- Clara
Club titles
- Kilkenny titles: 2
College
- Years: College
- 2012-2016: University College Dublin
Inter-county*
Years	County	Apps (scores)
2016-	Kilkenny	2 (0-3)
Inter-county titles
- Leinster titles: 1
- All-Irelands: 0
- NHL: 1
- All Stars: 0
- *Inter County team apps and scores correct as of 14:00, 4 September 2016.

Conor O'Shea (born 1993) is an Irish hurler who plays as a right wing-back for the Kilkenny senior team.

Born in Clara, County Kilkenny, O'Shea first played competitive hurling during his schooling at St. Kieran's College, winning back-to-back All-Ireland medals with the college in 2010 and 2011. He later came to prominence with the Clara club at underage levels before joining the intermediate team. An All-Ireland medal winner in this grade in 2013, O'Shea later won two county senior championship medals.

O'Shea made his debut on the inter-county scene at the age of sixteen when he first played for the Kilkenny minor team. He was an All-Ireland and Leinster medal winner in this grade in 2010. O'Shea joined the Kilkenny senior team in 2015 as a member of the extended panel.
