= Lester Ryan (hurler, born 1988) =

Irish hurler

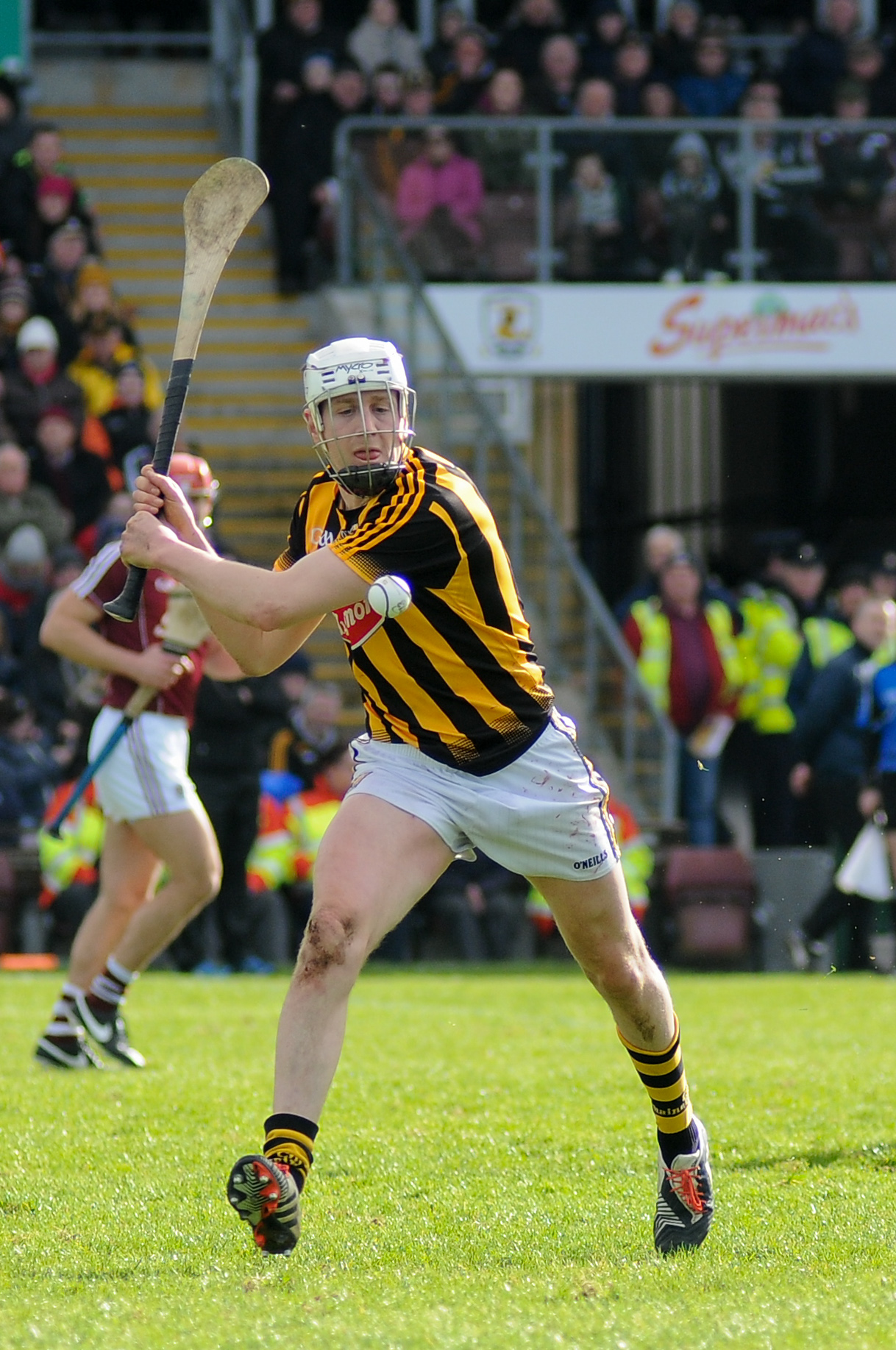
- Lester Ryan in action for Kilkenny against Galway in the 2015 National Hurling League at Pearse Stadium

Personal information
- Native name: Lester Ó Riain (Irish)
- Born: 1 May 1988 (age 38) Clara, County Kilkenny, Ireland
- Occupation: Secondary school teacher/Dairy Farmer
- Height: 6 ft 0 in (183 cm)

Sport
- Sport: Hurling
- Position: Midfield
Club
- Years: Club
- Clara
Club titles
- Kilkenny titles: 2
Inter-county*
Years	County	Apps (scores)
2011–present	Kilkenny	19 (0–11)
Inter-county titles
- Leinster titles: 4
- All-Irelands: 4
- NHL: 4
- All Stars: 0
- *Inter County team apps and scores correct as of 17:00, 7 December 2019 (championship apps and scores).

Lester Ryan (born 1 May 1988) is an Irish hurler who plays as a midfielder for the Kilkenny senior team.

Born in Clara, County Kilkenny, Ryan first arrived on the inter-county scene when he first linked up with the Kilkenny under-21 team, before later joining the intermediate side. He joined the senior panel for the 2011 championship. Ryan has since become a regular member of the team and has won four All-Ireland medals, four Leinster medals and four National Hurling League medals. He captained the team to the All-Ireland title in 2014. He has also captained Kilkenny to Leinster (2014 and 2016) and National Hurling League (2014) successes.

At club level Ryan is a two-time championship medallist at senior level with Clara. In addition to this he has also won All-Ireland, Leinster and championship medals in the intermediate grade.

Ryan's uncles, Lester and Harry Ryan, also played with Kilkenny.

== Playing career ==
=== Club ===
Ryan was just out of the minor grade when he enjoyed his first success with the Clara intermediate hurling team in 2007. A 1–15 to 0–12 defeat of St. Lachtain's in the championship decider gave him his first winners' medal in that competition.

Five years later in 2012, Ryan added a second intermediate championship medal to his collection following a 1–7 to 0–4 defeat of St. Patrick's Ballyragget. Clara subsequently faced Oylegate/Glenbrien in the provincial decider. An incredible game followed, which saw Oylgate having four men dismissed for second-yellow card offences. Clara powered to a 3–20 to 0–5 victory, with Ryan collecting a Leinster medal. The subsequent All-Ireland decider saw Clare face London-based St. Gabriel's. Clara were convincing 1–16 to 0–11 winners, with Ryan picking up an All-Ireland Intermediate Club Hurling Championship medal.

A year after making the step up to the top flight, Clara faced hot favourites Carrickshock in the senior championship decider in 2013. With four minutes of normal time left, Carrickshock looked the likely winners as they went two points ahead. Clara then won a free with just four minutes left. Ryan took the ball off regular free-taker Keith Hogan and decided to go for goal. Ryan fired to the net from 20 metres with a style similar to Anthony Nash. Two minutes later he popped over a point to extend Clara's lead. A 1–15 to 2–10 victory gave Ryan his first championship medal in the senior grade.

=== Inter-county ===
Ryan made his first impression on the inter-county scene in 2008 as a member of the Kilkenny under-21 team. He won his first Leinster medal that year as Kilkenny trounced Offaly by 2–21 to 2–9. Ryan later added an All-Ireland Under-21 Hurling Championship medal following a 2–13 to 0–15 defeat of Tipperary in the decider.

Kilkenny retained the provincial under-21 crown in 2009 following a 2–20 to 1–19 defeat of Dublin, giving Ryan a second Leinster medal in that grade. Kilkenny subsequently had the chance to retain the All-Ireland crown, however, Ryan's side faced a narrow 0–15 to 0–14 defeat by first time champions Clare.

Ryan joined the senior team after the 2011 National Hurling League and was a member of the panel for the subsequent Leinster and All-Ireland victories.

The 2012 National Hurling League was Ryan's first full campaign with the Kilkenny senior team, however, a knee cartilage injury after the first two rounds resulted in him facing a month-long lay-off. He was later restored to the starting fifteen and was once again a member of the panel as Kilkenny claimed All-Ireland honours.

Ryan was a regular member of the starting fifteen in 2013. He won a National Hurling League medal on the field of play that year as Kilkenny defeated Tipperary by 2–17 to 0–20. He finished off the campaign by being named GAA-GPA Hurler of the League. Ryan made his senior championship debut on 9 June 2013 in a 0–26 to 4–9 defeat of Offaly.

In February 2014 Ryan was appointed captain of the Kilkenny senior hurling team. In the League Final he was introduced as a substitute during the team's 2–25 to 1–27 extra-time defeat of Tipperary in the final. It was his second National League medal while he also had the honour of lifting the cup. He made a number of appearances in the championship, including in Kilkenny's 0–24 to 1–9 trouncing of Dublin in which he claimed his first Leinster medal on the field of play. On 7 September 2014, Kilkenny faced Tipperary in the All-Ireland decider. In what some consider to be the greatest game of all time, the sides were level when Tipperary were awarded a controversial free. John O'Dwyer had the chance to win the game, however, his late free drifted wide resulting in a draw. The replay on 27 September 2014 was also a close affair. Goals from brothers Richie and John Power inspired Kilkenny to a 2–17 to 2–14 victory. It was Ryan's third All-Ireland medal, while he also had the honour of lifting the Liam MacCarthy Cup.

As the Kilkenny captain is selected by the club champions, captaining Kilkenny twice is a rare feat. Ryan had the unique honour of captaining Kilkenny again in 2016 due to an injury sustained by club mate Shane Prendergast. He lifted the Bob O Keeffe cup for the second time on 3 July 2016 when Kilkenny defeated Galway in the provincial decider.

== Honours ==
=== Team ===
Clara

- Kilkenny Senior Club Hurling Championship (2): 2013, 2015
- Kilkenny Senior Hurling League (2): 2013, 2015
- All-Ireland Intermediate Club Hurling Championship (1): 2013
- Leinster Intermediate Club Hurling Championship (1): 2012
- Kilkenny Intermediate Club Hurling Championship (2): 2007, 2012

Kilkenny

- All-Ireland Senior Hurling Championship (4): 2011, 2012, 2014, 2015
- Leinster Senior Hurling Championship (4): 2011, 2014, 2015, 2016
- National Hurling League (4): 2012, 2013, 2014 (c), 2018
- Walsh Cup (1): 2012
- All-Ireland Under-21 Hurling Championship (1): 2008
- Leinster Under-21 Hurling Championship (2): 2008, 2009

Leinster

- Interprovincial Championship (1): 2014

=== Individual ===
Awards

- GAA-GPA Hurler of the League (1): 2013

Sporting positions
Preceded by Colin Fennelly; J. J. Delaney; J. J. Delaney; J. J. Delaney	Kilkenny Senior Hurling Captain; 2014	Succeeded by J. J. Delaney; J. J. Delaney; J. J. Delaney; Joey Holden
Achievements
Preceded by Patrick Donnellan (Clare)	All-Ireland Senior Hurling Final winning captain 2014	Succeeded by Joey Holden (Kilkenny)
