= Pat Henderson (hurler) =

Irish hurler and manager

Personal information
- Native name: Pádraig Mac Éinrí (Irish)
- Born: 30 January 1943 (age 83) Johnstown, County Kilkenny, Ireland
- Occupation: Retired company director
- Height: 5 ft 11 in (180 cm)

Sport
- Sport: Hurling
- Position: Centre-back
Clubs
- Years: Club
- Johnstown; Fenians
Club titles
- Kilkenny titles: 5
- Leinster titles: 1
- All-Ireland Titles: 0
Inter-county*
Years	County	Apps (scores)
1964–1978	Kilkenny	40 (0–6)
Inter-county titles
- Leinster titles: 8
- All-Irelands: 5
- NHL: 2
- All Stars: 2
- *Inter County team apps and scores correct as of 13:24, 10 July 2014.

Patrick Henderson (born 30 January 1943) is an Irish retired hurling manager and former player.

Born in Johnstown, County Kilkenny, Henderson first played competitive hurling during his schooling at Thurles CBS. He arrived on the inter-county scene at the age of eighteen when he first linked up with the Kilkenny minor team, before later joining the under-21 team. He made his senior debut during the 1964 championship. Henderson went on to play a key role over the next fifteen years, and one five All-Ireland medals, eight Leinster medals and two National Hurling League medals. He was an All-Ireland runner-up on five occasions.

As a member of the Leinster inter-provincial team on a number of occasions, Henderson won six Railway Cup medals. At club level he is a one-time Leinster medallist with Fenians, in addition to this he also won five championship medals.

In his inter-county career, Henderson made 40 championship appearances for Kilkenny. His retirement came following the conclusion of the 1978 championship.

His brothers, Ger and John, also had All-Ireland successes with Kilkenny.

In retirement from playing Henderson became involved in team management and coaching. During a near decade long tenure as Kilkenny manager he guided the team to three All-Ireland titles.

As well as collecting back-to-back All-Stars, Henderson was named Hurler of the Year in 1974. Henderson has been voted onto several teams made up of the sport's greats, including at centre-back on the "Kilkenny team of the century".

== Biography ==
Born in Johnstown, County Kilkenny, Henderson was the eldest son in a family that would later become heavily involved with hurling in Kilkenny. His two younger brothers, Ger and John, would form the backbone of the Kilkenny inter-county team of the 1970s.

Henderson was educated at Johnstown national school before later receiving his secondary schooling at Thurles CBS. Here he played in the Dr. Harty Cup competition, failing to win the provincial title during Henderson's tenure.

== Playing career ==
=== Club ===
Henderson began his club hurling career with Johnstown before the Fenians club was formed in 1968.

After being defeated by James Stephens in the championship decider in 1969, both sides squared off against each other in the final the following year. A 2–11 to 3–5 victory gave Henderson his first championship medal.

After surrendering their championship to Bennettsbridge in the decider in 1971, Fenians returned to the final once again the following year. It was a rematch of the previous year with Henderson's side securing a 3–10 to 1–6 victory. Defeats of James Stephens and Bennettsbridge in the respective finals of 1973 and 1974 brought Henderson's medal tally to four. Fenians subsequently represented Kilkenny in the provincial club series and reached the final. A narrow 2–6 to 1–6 defeat of St. Rynagh's of Offaly resulted in the Fenians becoming the first Kilkenny club to take the Leinster title. The subsequent All-Ireland final pitted Henderson's side against St. Finbarr's of Cork. The Barr's won the game on a 3–8 to 1–6 scoreline.

A fourth successive county title proved beyond Henderson's side in 1975, however, two years later Fenians were back in the championship decider. The club met Rower-Inistioge in the final and, following a 3–11 to 1–10 victory, Henderson won his fifth and final championship medal .

=== Inter-county ===
Henderson first came to prominence on the inter-county scene as a member of the Kilkenny minor hurling team in 1961. In that year, he collected a Leinster minor medal following a 4–12 to 0–7 trouncing of Dublin. Henderson later collected an All-Ireland Minor Hurling Championship medal following a 3–13 to 0–15 defeat of Tipperary.

In 1964 Henderson was at centre-back on Kilkenny's inaugural under-21 team, however, defeat was his lot in his sole outing in that championship.

Henderson made his senior championship debut for Kilkenny on 5 July 1964 in a 5–9 to 4–8 Leinster semi-final defeat of Wexford. He later collected his first Leinster medal as Dublin were defeated by 4–11 to 1–8 in the decider. The All-Ireland final on 6 September 1964 saw Kilkenny enter the game as favourites against rivals Tipperary. John McKenna scored Tipp's first goal after ten minutes as the Munster champions took a 1–8 to 0–6 interval lead. In the second half, Tipperary's Donie Nealon scored a hat-trick of goals and Seán McLoughlin another. At the full-time whistle, Tipperary had won by 5–13 to 2–8.

After surrendering their provincial crown in 1965, Kilkenny bounced back the following year by reaching the National League decider. An aggregate 10–15 to 2–15 defeat of New York gave Henderson his first National Hurling League medal. He later won a second Leinster medal following a 1–15 to 2–6 defeat of Wexford. The subsequent All-Ireland final on 4 September 1966 pitted Kilkenny against Cork for the first time in nineteen years. Kilkenny were the favourites, however, a hat-trick of goals by Colm Sheehan gave Cork a merited 3–9 to 1–10 victory.

Kilkenny retained their provincial crown in 1967, with Henderson adding a third Leinster medal to his collection following a 4–10 to 1–12 defeat of Wexford after a scare in the opening half. 3 September 1967 saw Kilkenny face Tipperary in the All-Ireland decider. Tipp looked like continuing their hoodoo over their near rivals as they took a 2–6 to 1–3 lead at half-time. Goalkeeper Ollie Walsh was the hero for Kilkenny as he made a series of spectacular saves, however, the team lost Eddie Keher and Tom Walsh to injury in the second half. In spite of this, Kilkenny laid to rest a bogey that Tipperary had over the team since 1922, and a 3–8 to 2–7 victory gave Henderson his first All-Ireland medal.

Wexford ended Kilkenny's hopes of retaining the title in 1968. However, Kilkenny won the provincial title the following year with Henderson collecting a fourth Leinster medal following a 3–9 to 0–16 defeat of Offaly in the final. On 7 September 1969, Kilkenny faced Cork in the All-Ireland decider. Cork got into their stride following an early goal by Charlie McCarthy and led by six points coming up to half time when Kilkenny scored a goal themselves. Kilkenny upped their performance after the interval and ran out winners on a 2–15 to 2–9 scoreline. The victory gave Henderson a second All-Ireland medal.

After surrendering their provincial and All-Ireland crowns to Wexford the following year, Kilkenny began their dominance of the provincial championship in 1971. Henderson was appointed captain for the year, however, he missed the Leinster final victory through injury. He was back on the team for 5 September 1971 when Kilkenny faced Tipperary in the All-Ireland final, the first to be broadcast in colour by Telefís Éireann and the only eighty-minute meeting between the two sides. Kilkenny's ever-dependable goalkeeper, Ollie Walsh, had a nightmare of a game in which he conceded five goals, one of which passed through his legs, while that year's Hurler of the Year, "Babs" Keating, played out the closing stages of the game in his bare feet. Eddie Keher set a new record by scoring 2–11, however, it wasn't enough as Tipperary emerged the victors on a score line of 5–17 to 5–14.

In 1972 Henderson won a fifth Leinster medal following a thrilling draw and replay victory over Wexford. Once again, Cork provided the opposition in the All-Ireland final on 3 September 1972, a game which is often considered to be one of the classic games of the modern era. Halfway through the second-half Cork were on form and stretched their lead to eight points. Drastic action was required for Kilkenny and Eddie Keher was deployed closer to the Cork goal and finished the game with a tally of 2–9. Henderson collected his third All-Ireland medal following a remarkable 3–24 to 5–11 victory.

Henderson added a sixth Leinster medal to his collection following a 4–22 to 3–15 defeat of Wexford. Kilkenny later faced Limerick in the All-Ireland final on 2 September 1973, however, their plans were hampered as a result of injuries and emigration. In spite of this, the game hung in the balance for the first-half, however, eight minutes after the restart Mossie Dowling got a vital goal for Limerick. Shortly after this Richie Bennis spearheaded a rampant Limerick attack which resulted in a 1–21 to 1–14 victory for Limerick. In spite of this defeat Henderson later collected his first All-Star.

Wexford were, once again, narrowly defeated by Kilkenny in the 1974 provincial decider. The remarkable 6–13 to 2–24 victory gave Henderson a seventh Leinster medal. In a repeat of the previous year Limerick provided the opposition in the subsequent All-Ireland final on 1 September 1974. The Munster champions stormed to a five-point lead in the first eleven minutes, however, a converted penalty by Eddie Keher, supplemented by two further goals gave Kilkenny a 3–19 to 1–13 victory and gave Henderson a fourth All-Ireland medal. He later won a second All-Star award, as well as the Texaco Hurler of the Year award.

Kilkenny made it five successive provincial titles in-a-row in 1975. The 2–20 to 2–14 defeat of Wexford gave Henderson his eighth Leinster medal. On 7 September 1975, Henderson lined out in another All-Ireland final, with surprise semi-final winners Galway providing the opposition. Playing with the wind in the first half, Galway found themselves ahead by 0–9 to 1–3 at the interval. Eddie Keher's huge tally of 2–7 kept Galway at bay giving Kilkenny a 2–22 to 2–10 victory. It was a fifth All-Ireland medal for Henderson.

In 1976 Kilkenny looked a sure bet to capture a third successive All-Ireland crown. The season began well with Henderson winning a second National League medal following a 6–14 to 1–14 trouncing of Clare in a replay. Kilkenny's championship ambitions unravelled in spectacular fashion in the subsequent provincial campaign, when a 2–20 to 1–6 trouncing by Wexford dumped Henderson's team out of the championship.

Henderson was now in the twilight of his career as Kilkenny's fortunes took an upward turn in 1978. He missed Kilkenny's provincial victory, however, he was included on the starting fifteen that faced Cork in the subsequent All-Ireland decider on 3 September 1978. Cork secured a first three-in-a-row of All-Ireland titles for the first time in over twenty years, as a Jimmy Barry-Murphy goal helped the team to a 1–15 to 2–8 victory over Kilkenny. This defeat brought the curtain down on Henderson's inter-county career.

=== Inter-provincial ===
Henderson also lined out with the great Leinster team in the inter-provincial hurling championship. He captured Railway Cup titles with his province in 1967, 1971, 1973, 1974, 1975 and 1977.

== Managerial career ==
Pat Henderson
Sport
Inter-county management
- Years: Team
- 1978–1980 1981–1987: Kilkenny; Kilkenny
Inter-county titles as manager
County	League	Province	All-Ireland
Kilkenny	3	5	5

=== Kilkenny ===
In retirement from playing, Henderson turned his hand to inter-county management. Together with Eddie Keher he guided Kilkenny to an All-Ireland victory over Galway in 1979. Three years later in 1982 Henderson was the sole manager of his native-county. That year he coached Kilkenny to a National Hurling League victory, as well as an All-Ireland final victory over Cork. In 1983 this was repeated with another brace of National league and All-Ireland victories.

== Honours ==
=== Team ===
Fenians

- Leinster Senior Club Hurling Championship (1): 1974
- Kilkenny Senior Club Hurling Championship (5): 1970, 1972, 1973, 1974, 1978

Kilkenny

- All-Ireland Senior Hurling Championship (5): 1967, 1969, 1972, 1974, 1975
- Leinster Senior Hurling Championship (9): 1964, 1966, 1967, 1969, 1972, 1973, 1974, 1975, 1978 (sub)
- National Hurling League (2): 1965–66, 1975–76
- All-Ireland Minor Hurling Championship (1): 1961
- Leinster Minor Hurling Championship (1): 1961

Leinster

- Railway Cup (6): 1967, 1971, 1973, 1974 (c), 1975, 1977

=== Manager ===
Kilkenny

- All-Ireland Senior Hurling Championship (3): 1979, 1982, 1983
- Leinster Senior Hurling Championship (5): 1979, 1982, 1983, 1986, 1987
- National Hurling League (3): 1981–82, 1982–83, 1985–86

=== Individual ===
- Kilkenny Hurling Team of the Century: Centre-forward
- Texaco Hurler of the Year (1): 1974
- All-Stars (2): 1973, 1974
- Philips Sports Manager of the Year (1): 1982

Sporting positions
Preceded by Mick Crotty	Kilkenny Senior Hurling Captain; 1971	Succeeded by Pat Delaney
Preceded by Pat Delaney	Kilkenny Senior Hurling Captain; 1971	Succeeded by Noel Skehan
Preceded by Pat Delaney	Leinster Hurling Captain; 1974	Succeeded by Pat Delaney
Preceded by Fr. Tommy Maher	Kilkenny Senior Hurling Manager (jointly with Eddie Keher); 1978–1980	Succeeded by Phil "Fan" Larkin
Preceded by Phil "Fan" Larkin	Kilkenny Senior Hurling Manager; 1981–1987	Succeeded by Eddie Keher
Awards
Preceded by Éamonn Grimes (Limerick)	Texaco Hurler of the Year; 1974	Succeeded by Liam 'Chunky' O'Brien (Kilkenny)
Achievements
Preceded by Pat Delaney (Leinster)	Railway Cup Hurling Final winning captain 1974	Succeeded by Pat Delaney (Leinster)
Preceded by Fr. Bertie Troy (Cork)	All-Ireland Senior Hurling Final winning manager (jointly with Eddie Keher); 1979	Succeeded by Cyril Farrell (Galway)
Preceded by Dermot Healy (Offaly)	All-Ireland Senior Hurling Final winning manager 1982–1983	Succeeded by Justin McCarthy & Michael O'Brien (Cork)
