= Clara Castle =

Tower house in County Kilkenny, Ireland

- Caisleán Chláraigh (Irish)
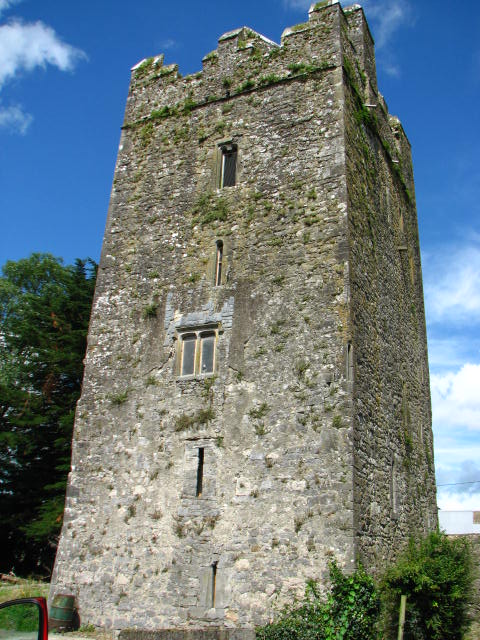

- Location within Ireland
- 52.669444°N 7.152222°W
- Type: tower house
- Location: Clara Upper, Clara, County Kilkenny, Ireland

History
- Built: c. 1500

Site notes
- Height: 20 m (66 ft)
- Area: Nore Valley

National monument of Ireland
- Official name: Clara Castle
- Reference no.: 274

Clara Castle is a tower house (caiseal) located in County Kilkenny, Ireland.

== Location ==
Clara Castle is located about 6 km (3.7 mi) east of Kilkenny City, near one of the headwaters of the Nore.

== History ==
Clara Castle was built in the late 15th/early 16th century by the Shortall family, who lived there until c. 1640. Henry Johnson occupied the castle in the Cromwellian period, and it later passed to the Byrnes; occupants include Anthony Byrne (1656–1720), Lewis Byrne (1690–1766), Mathew Byrne (1694–1754), Anthony Byrne (1725–1810), Michael Byrne (1762–1835). The castle was occupied up until 1905.

== Building ==
Clara Castle is five storeys tall with a vault above the third floor. On the north side is a bawn measuring 10 m × 22 m (33 ft × 72 ft). The building retains many of its original oak doors and floor beams. There is a murder-hole above the entrance, which is also protected by a yett and drawbar.

The second floor, probably the lord's chamber, has a hooded chimneypiece, mural passage, garderobe and a small bedroom. It was originally painted blue and one wall has a Crucifixion mural. The floor above, contains a secret chamber.

The top floor chamber is the largest and best-lit room in the castle, used for general family living. Its large lintelled fireplace is a secondary insertion, so the fireplace in this room must originally have been in the centre of the floor. The roof above is modern, while the parapets are crenellated in the Irish style with loopholes, alure, machicolation and weeps.
