= Clones, County Fermanagh =

Civil parish in Northern Ireland

Clones is a civil parish located in the barony of Clankelly in County Fermanagh, Northern Ireland, and in County Monaghan, Republic of Ireland.

== See also ==
- Clones, County Monaghan
