= 1981–82 National Hurling League =

51st season of the National Hurling League

League details
- Dates: 11 October 1981 – 18 April 1982

League champions
- Winners: Kilkenny (5th win)

The 1981–82 National Hurling League was the 51st season of the National Hurling League.

== Division 1 ==
National Hurling League Division 1
- Season: 1981-82
- Champions: Kilkenny; 5th National League title Captain: Brian Cody; Manager: Pat Henderson
- All statistics correct as of 12 March 2017.

Cork came into the season as defending champions of the 1980-81 season. Carlow entered Division 1 as the promoted team.

On 18 April 1982, Kilkenny won the title after a 2-14 to 1-11 win over Wexford in the final. It was their 5th league title overall and their first since 1975-76.

=== Division 1A table ===
Pos	Team	Pld	W	D	L	Pts	Notes
1	Waterford	6	5	0	1	10	
2	Cork	6	4	0	2	8	
3	Tipperary	6	4	0	2	8	
4	Galway	6	3	0	3	6	
5	Offaly	6	3	0	3	6	
6	Clare	6	2	0	4	4	
7	Laois	6	0	0	6	0	

=== Group stage ===
10 October 1981	Tipperary	2-07 - 2-11	Waterford	Semple Stadium, Thurles
	P McGrath 1-1, J Kennedy 1-0, M McGrath 0-2, G O'Neill 0-2, C Bonnar 0-1, K Fox 0-1.		P Curran 1-2, J Greene 1-2, T Casey 0-2, P McGrath 0-1, K Ryan 0-1, P Ryan 0-1, S Breen 0-1, E Nolan 0-1.	Referee: J Denton (Wexford)

10 October 1981	Offaly	1-07 - 1-20	Galway	St. Brendan's Park, Birr
	P Horan 1-2, P Delaney 0-4, J Flaherty 0-1.		S Linnane 0-13, PJ Molloy 1-1, N Lane 0-3, F Gantley 0-1, B Forde 0-1, A Fenton 0-1.	Referee: M Kelleher (Kildare)

18 October 1981	Cork	4-13 - 1-07	Laois	Páirc Uí Chaoimh, Cork
	D O'Flynn 2-1, T Coyne 1-2, É O'Donoghue 1-0, B Óg Murphy 0-3, P Horgan 0-3, T Cashman 0-2, J Barry-Murphy 0-1, P Crowley 0-1.		M Brophy 0-4, C Jones 1-0, M Walsh 0-2, B Bohane 0-1.	Referee: S O'Meara (Tipperary)

25 October 1981	Clare	2-06 - 2-15	Offaly	Cusack Park, Ennis
	N Ryan 1-0, V Donnellan 1-0, J Callinan 0-2, S Heaslip 0-2, T Ryan 0-2.		P Horan 1-5, B Bermingham 1-2, T Conneely 0-3, P Carroll 0-3, P Kirwan 0-2.	Referee: N Duggan (Limerick)

25 October 1981	Cork	0-12 - 2-05	Waterford	Walsh Park, Waterford
	S Breen 0-4, M Whelan 0-2, T Casey 0-2, T Maher 0-2, P McGrath 0-2.		P Crowley 1-2, É O'Donoghue 1-0, T Coyne 0-2, F Collins 0-1.	Referee: G Ryan (Tipperary)

1 November 1981	Galway	2-10 - 4-07	Tipperary	Dunlo GAA Grounds, Ballinasloe
	N Lane 1-2, F Gantley 0-5, J Connolly 1-0, PJ Molloy 0-2, I Clarke 0-1.		J Grogan 2-2, J Kennedy 1-1, G O'Neill 1-0, M Carroll 0-2, N English 0-2.	Referee: S O'Connor (Limerick)

8 November 1981	Laois	2-13 - 3-12	Waterford	Kelly Daly Park, Rathdowney
	M Brophy 1-8, PJ Cuddy 1-0, B Bohane 0-2, C Jones 0-1, M Cuddy 0-1, M Walsh 0-1.		T Casey 2-1, J Greene 1-2, P Curran 0-4, E Nolan 0-2, J Hennebry 0-1, S Breen 0-1, P Ryan 0-1.	Referee: N O'Donoghue (Clare)

8 November 1981	Tipperary	2-12 - 1-10	Clare	Semple Stadium, Thurles
	C Bonnar 2-1, J Grogan 0-3, G O'Neill 0-2, M McGrath 0-2, A Kinsella 0-1, J Kennedyy 0-1, N English 0-1, E O'Shea 0-1.		S Heaslip 1-0, J Callinan 0-3, G Loughnane 0-2, G McInerney 0-2, S Stack 0-1, T Nugent 0-1, N Ryan 0-1.	Referee: N Duggan (Limerick)

15 November 1981	Cork	1-14 - 0-10	Galway	Páirc Uí Chaoimh, Cork
	T Cashman 0-5, J Allen 1-0, B Óg Murphy 0-3, É O'Donoghue 0-3, T O'Sullivan 0-2, J Barry-Murphy 0-1.	J Connolly 0-4, PJ Molloy 0-2, S Mahon 0-2, B Forde 0-1, I Clarke 0-1.		Referee: J Denton (Waterford)

22 November 1981	Offaly	0-11 - 1-16	Tipperary	O'Connor Park, Tullamore
	P Horan 0-9, P Carroll 0-1, D Owens 0-1.		J Kennedy 1-2, M Carroll 0-4, N English 0-3, G O'Neill 0-3, M McGrath 0-2, P Ryan 0-1, B Ryan 0-1.

22 November 1981	Clare	0-03 - 3-14	Cork	Cusack Park, Ennis
	B Smyth 0-1, S Hehir 0-1, P O'Connor 0-1.		T Cashman 1-4, J Barry-Murphy 1-0, P Crowley 1-0, B Óg Murphy 0-3, É O'Donoghue 0-3, J Allen 0-1, F Collins 0-1, T Crowley 0-1, T Deasy 0-1.

22 November 1981	Galway	3-18 - 4-07	Laois	Pearse Stadium, Salthill
	B Forde 1-4, S Linnane 0-6, I Clarke 1-2, J Connolly 1-2, K Fahy 0-3, N Lane 0-1.		M Brophy 1-4, M Walsh 1-1, PJ Cuddy 1-0, M Keegan 1-0, B Bohane 0-1, J Killeen 0-1.	Referee: G Kirwan (Offaly)

6 December 1981	Cork	0-12 - 1-10	Offaly	Páirc Uí Chaoimh, Cork
	T Cashman 0-5, P Horgan 0-2, C Ryan 0-2, B Óg Murphy 0-2, É O'Donoghue 0-1.		P Horan 1-3, P Delaney 0-3, L Currams 0-3, M Corrigan 0-1.	Referee: N Duggan (Limerick)

6 December 1981	Waterford	2-12 - 2-07	Galway	Fraher Field, Dungarvan
	S Breen 1-1, E Nolan 1-0, J Greene 0-3, M Walsh 0-3, T Casey 0-2, T Maher 0-1, P Ryan 0-1, P Curran 0-1.		K Fahy 1-1, F Gantley 1-1, J Connolly 0-2, S Linnane 0-2, PJ Molloy 0-1.	Referee: J Moloney (Tipperary)

6 December 1981	Laois	2-10 - 4-10	Clare	Kelly Daly Park, Rathdowney
	M Brophy 1-5, PJ Cuddy 1-1, M Walsh 0-2, C Jones 0-1, E Fennelly 0-1.		D Coote 1-5, P O'Connor 1-1, T Nugent 1-1, J Callinan 1-1, S Heaslip 0-1, N O'Grady 0-1.	Referee: J Kirwan (Offaly)

7 February 1982	Tipperary	0-08 - 0-10	Cork	Semple Stadium, Thurles
	M McGrath 0-5, N English 0-1, G O'Neill 0-1, M Carroll 0-1.		T Cashman 0-2, É O'Donoghue 0-2, T O'Sullivan 0-2, B Óg Murphy 0-1, J Barry-Murphy 0-1, T Crowley 0-1, P Horgan 0-1.	Referee: N Duggan (Limerick)

7 February 1982	Offaly	1-08 - 1-07	Laois	O'Connor Park, Tullamore
	M Corrigan 1-2, P Horan 0-3, P Carroll 0-1, S White 0-1, P Kirwan 0-1.		M Brophy 0-5, T Flynn 1-0, M Walsh 0-2.	Referee: G Ryan (Tipperary)

7 February 1982	Clare	1-11 - 1-06	Waterford	Cusack Park, Ennis
	G McInerney 1-4, D Coote 0-5, J Callinan 0-2.		Mossy Walsh 1-0, Michael Walsh 0-2, J Greene 0-2, P McGrath 0-1, K Ryan 0-1.	Referee: S Brennan (Galway)

28 February 1982	Laois	0-05 - 2-12	Tipperary	Kelly Daly Park, Rathdowney
	B Bohane 0-2, PJ Cuddy 0-1, P Critchley 0-1, M Brophy 0-1.		N English 0-6, A Buckley 1-0, C Bonnar 1-0, A Kinsella 0-3, G O'Neill 0-2, G Stapleton 0-1.

28 February 1982	Waterford	3-14 - 0-10	Offaly	Walsh Park, Waterford
	J Greene 2-1, T Casey 1-3, Michael Walsh 0-2, S Breen 0-2, E Nolan 0-2, P McGrath 0-1, P Ryan 0-1, T Maher 0-1, P Curran 0-1.		P Horan 0-5, P Carroll 0-1, M Corrigan 0-1, D Owens 0-1, A Fogarty 0-1, E Coughlan 0-1.	Referee: J Denton (Wexford)

28 February 1982	Galway	1-12 - 2-07	Clare	Pearse Stadium, Salthill
	PJ Molloy 1-4, M Connolly 0-2, B Forde 0-2, J Connolly 0-1, F Gantley 0-1, N Lane 0-1, B Lynskey 0-1.		G McInerney 1-0, V Donnellan 1-0, D Coote 0-2, T Nugent 0-1, S McMahon 0-1, J Callinan 0-1, M Quaid 0-1, P O'Connor 0-1.	Referee: J Moloney (Tipperary)

=== Division 1B table ===
Pos	Team	Pld	W	D	L	Pts	Notes
1	Kilkenny	7	7	0	0	14	Division 1 champions
2	Wexford	7	6	0	1	12	Division 1 runners-up
3	Limerick	7	5	0	2	10	
4	Dublin	7	4	0	3	8	
5	Westmeath	7	3	0	4	6	
6	Antrim	7	1	0	6	2	
7	Kerry	7	1	0	6	2	
8	Carlow	7	1	0	6	2	

=== Group stage ===
4 October 1981	Kilkenny	1-19 - 1-09	Kerry	Nowlan Park, Kilkenny
	G Fennelly 0-8, R Power 1-1, K Brennan 0-3, M Nash 0-3, J Brennan 0-1, M Brennan 0-1, L Fennelly 0-1, S Fennelly 0-1.		J Bunyan 0-5, T Nolan 1-1, PJ Houlihan 0-1, DJ Leahy 0-1, J McElligott 0-1.	Referee: N Matthews (Wexford)

11 October 1981	Wexford	3-08 - 1-11	Limerick	Wexford Park, Wexford
	P Codd 2-1, M Quigley 1-0, J Fleming 0-3, P Courtney 0-2, M Jacob 0-1, G O'Connor 0-1.		É Cregan 1-3, J McKenna 0-2, J Carroll 0-2, W Fitzmaurice 0-1, J Flanagan 0-1, D Fitzgerald 0-1, P Kelly 0-1.	Referee: N Dalton (Waterford)

11 October 1981	Dublin	3-08 - 2-05	Westmeath	Croke Park, Dublin
	J Morris 2-0, T Grealish 1-1, P Carton 0-2, L Hennebry 0-2, E Ryan 0-1, P Browne 0-1, M Holden 0-1.		F Shiels 1-1, M Cosgrove 1-0, W Shanley 0-2, D Kilcoyne 0-1, JJ Lynch 0-1.	Referee: J Rankins (Laois)

25 October 1981	Antrim	2-12 - 1-19	Dublin	Casement Park, Belfast
	B Donnelly 1-1, D McNaughton 0-4, P Boyle 0-4, J de Largy 1-0, S Collins 0-2, P McFall 0-1.		G Hayes 0-7, J Morris 0-6, M Morris 1-1, T Grealish 0-2, P McLoughlin 0-1, E Ryan 0-1, P Carton 0-1.	Referee: S McGrattan (Down)

8 November 1981	Kilkenny	5-12 - 0-06	Westmeath	Nowlan Park, Kilkenny
	C Heffernan 2-0, B Fitzpatrick 1-3, K Brennan 1-3, R Power 1-0, L Fennelly 0-3, G Fennelly 0-2, J Hennessy 0-1.		J Leonard 0-4, M Cosgrove 0-1, M Ryan 0-1.	Referee: J Matthews (Wexford)

=== Play-offs ===
7 March 1982 Play-off	Cork	0-16 - 1-4	Tipperary	Gaelic Grounds, Limerick
	J Fenton 0-7, P Crowley 0-2, T Deasy 0-2, B Óg Murphy 0-2, J Buckley 0-1, E O'Donoghue 0-1, D McCurtain 0-1.		B Ryan 1-3, J Kennedy 0-1.	Referee: G Kirwan (Offaly)

7 March 1982 Play-off	Galway	1-11 - 1-7	Offaly	Gaelic Grounds, Limerick
	PJ Molloy 0-8, P Piggott 1-0, B Lynskey 0-1, J Connolly 0-1, S Linnane 0-1.		P Horan 0-4, D Devery 1-0, P Delaney 0-1, P Carroll 0-1, M Corrigan 0-1.	Referee: N Duggan (Limerick)

=== Knock-out stage ===
Quarter-finals

14 March 1982 Quarter-final	Kilkenny	1-11 - 1-6	Galway	Croke Park, Dublin
	B Fitzpatrick 1-3, K Brennan 0-2, B Walton 0-2, R Power 0-1, G Fennelly 0-1, J Hennessy 0-1, L Fennelly 0-1.		PJ Molloy 0-4, John Connolly 1-0, B Forde 0-2.	Referee: J Denton (Wexford)

14 March 1982 Quarter-final	Wexford	0-16 - 0-11	Tipperary	Walsh Park, Waterford
	N Buggy 0-8, J Murphy 0-4, G O'Connor 0-2, M Jacob 0-1, S Kinsella 0-1.		P McGrath 0-5, B Ryan 0-2, N English 0-2, K Fox 0-1, J Kennedy 0-1.	Referee: P Long (Kilkenny)

Semi-finals

4 April 1982 Semi-final	Cork	1-16 - 2-17	Wexford	Semple Stadium, Thurles
	J Fenton 0-7, P Crowley 1-0, J Buckley 0-2, T Deasy 0-2, J Barry-Murphy 0-2, T Crowley 0-1, B Óg Murphy 0-1, F Collins 0-1.		J Holohan 0-8, T Doran 2-0, S Kinsella 0-4, G O'Connor 0-2, M Quigley 0-1, P Courtney 0-1, M Jacob 0-1.	Referee: G Kirwan (Offaly)

4 April 1982 Semi-final	Waterford	1-17 - 2-14	Kilkenny	Semple Stadium, Thurles
	T Casey 1-7, P McGrath 0-4, S Breen 0-3, P Curran 0-1, J Greene 0-1, Michael Walsh 0-1.		C Heffernan 2-1, B Fitzpatrick 0-6, R Power 0-3, G Fennelly 0-2, K Brennan 0-1, L Fennelly 0-1.	Referee: N Duggan (Limerick)

11 April 1982 Semi-final replay	Waterford	4-6 - 3-14	Kilkenny	Semple Stadium, Thurles
	T Casey 1-4, P Curran 1-0, T Maher 1-0, J Greene 1-0, S Breen 0-1, M Walsh 0-1.		L Fennelly 2-2, B Fitzpatrick 0-4, M Brennan 1-0, J Hennessy 0-3, G Fennelly 0-2, R Power 0-1, M Ruth 0-1, N Brennan 0-1.	Referee: N Duggan (Limerick)

Final

18 April 1982 Final	Kilkenny	2-14 - 1-11	Wexford	Croke Park, Dublin
	B Fitzpatrick 0-7, M Brennan 1-2, M Ruth 1-0, L Fennelly 0-2, R Power 0-1, F Cummins 0-1, K Brennan 0-1.		S Kinsella 1-1, J Fleming 0-3, P Courtney 0-2, J Holohan 0-2, J Murphy 0-2, M Jacob 0-1.	Attendance: 23,125; Referee: G Ryan (Tipperary)

=== Scoring statistics ===
Top scorers overall

Rank	Player	Team	Tally	Total	Matches	Average
1	Christy Heffernan	Kilkenny	13-07	46	10	4.60
2	Billy Fitzpatrick	Kilkenny	2-39	45	9	5.00
3	Pádraig Horan	Offaly	3-31	40	7	5.71
4	Johnny Walsh	Kildare	1-33	36	5	7.20
5	Martin Brophy	Laois	3-27	36	6	6.00
6	Danny McNaughton	Antirm	3-26	35	7	5.00
7	Ned Buggy	Wexford	3-24	33	5	6.60
8	M. Murphy	Carlow	0-30	30	7	4.28
9	P. J. Molloy	Galway	2-22	28	8	3.50
10	Kieran Brennan	Kilkenny	3-18	27	11	2.45

== Division 2 ==
=== Table ===
Pos	Team	Pld	W	D	L	Pts	Notes
1	Wicklow	6	6	0	0	12	Division 2 champions
2	Meath	6	4	1	1	9	
3	Kildare	6	3	0	3	6	
4	Mayo	5	3	0	2	6	
5	Down	6	1	2	3	4	
6	Roscommon	5	1	0	4	2	
7	Armagh	6	0	0	6	0	
