= 1982–83 National Hurling League =

52nd season of the National Hurling League

League details
- Dates: 17 October 1982 – 17 July 1983

League champions
- Winners: Kilkenny (6th win)

Other division winners
- Division 2: Limerick
- Division 3: Kildare
- Division 4: Cavan

The 1982–83 National Hurling League was the 52nd season of the National Hurling League.

== Division 1 ==
National Hurling League Division 1
- Season: 1982-83
- Champions: Kilkenny; 5th National League title Captain: Liam Fennelly; Manager: Pat Henderson
- Relegated: Offaly; Tipperary
- Matches played: 32
- Top goalscorer: Billy Fitzpatrick (4-33)
- All statistics correct as of 5 March 2017.

Division 1 saw a major restructuring with the abolition of the fourteen-team top flight which had previously been divided into two groups of seven teams. For the 1982-83 season, Division 1 was limited to a single group of eight teams.

Kilkenny came into the season as defending champions of the 1981-82 season.

On 24 April 1983, Kilkenny won the title after a 2-14 to 2-12 win over Limerick in the final. It was their 5th league title overall and their second in succession.

Kilkenny's Billy Fitzpatrick was the Division 1 top scorer with 4-33.

=== Table ===
Pos	Team	Pld	W	D	L	Pts	Notes
1	Kilkenny	7	5	1	1	11	National League champions
2	Wexford	7	5	0	2	10	
3	Clare	7	5	0	2	10	
4	Cork	7	3	1	3	7	
5	Galway	7	3	0	4	6	
6	Waterford	7	2	1	4	5	
7	Tipperary	7	2	0	5	4	Relegated to Division 2
8	Offaly	7	1	1	5	3	Relegated to Division 2

=== Group stage results ===
17 October 1982	Waterford	2-11 - 1-18	Wexford	Walsh Park, Waterford
	T Casey 1-5, R Walsh 1-0, P Bennett 0-3, J Greene 0-2, L Power 0-1.		S Kinsella 1-5, J Walker 0-4, J Hoilihan 0-3, J Murphy 0-2, P Courtney 0-1, M Quigley 0-1, L O'Hanlon 0-1.	Referee: D BItler (Kilkenny)

17 October 1982	Galway	1-8 - 1-13	Clare	Pearse Stadium, Salthill
	PJ Molloy 1-5, I Clarke 0-1, J Murphy 0-1, T Furey 0-1.		M Quane 1-3, C Honan 0-5, T Nugent 0-2, J Callinan 0-1, E O'Connor 0-1, G McInerney 0-1.	Referee: S O'Meara (Tipperary)

31 October 1982	Clare	4-9 - 3-11	Kilkenny	Cusack Park, Ennis
	P Morey 3-0, G McInerney 1-1, J Callinan 0-3, A Nugent 0-2, C Lyons 0-1, K McNamara 0-1, E O'Connor 0-1.		W Purcell 2-0, B Fitzpatrick 0-5, C Heffernan 1-1, J Hennessy 0-2, L Fennelly 0-1.	Referee: N Duggan (Limerick)

31 October 1982	Wexford	0-18 - 1-12	Galway	Enniscorthy
	M Jacob 0-4, S Kinsella 0-4, T Doran 0-3, J Walker 0-2, J Murphy 0-2, P Courtney 0-1, J Holohan 0-1, M Quigley 0-1.		PJ Molloy 1-4, P Piggott 0-2, B Forde 0-2, T Furey 0-1, F Burke 0-1, A Staunton 0-1, I Clarke 0-1.	Referee: N DAlton (Waterford)

31 October 1982	Offaly	3-7 - 0-12	Cork	St. Brendan's Park, Birr
	P Horan 1-3, J Kelly 1-2, P Delaney 1-1, L Currams 0-1.		T Cashman 0-3, K Hennessy 0-2, M Fitzgibbon 0-2, T Finn 0-2, T McCarthy 0-1, T Crowley 0-1, S O'Gorman 0-1.	Referee: J Rankins (Laois)

31 October 1982	Tipperary	2-13 - 2-7	Waterford	Semple Stadium, Thurles
	P Looby 1-3, S Bourke 0-6, J Caesar 1-1, J Carey 0-1, N English 0-1, B Ryan 0-1.		P Bennett 1-1, J Greene 1-0, T Casey 0-3, S Breen 0-2, R Walsh 0-1.	Referee: G Kirwan (Offaly)

7 November 1982	Kilkenny	1-11 - 0-14	Offaly	Nowlan Park, Kilkenny
	B Fitzpatrick 0-6, L Fennelly 1-0, C Heffernan 0-2, F Cummins 0-1, J Hennessy 0-1, W Purcell 0-1.		P Carroll 0-4, J Kelly 0-3, P Delaney 0-3, P Horan 0-2, M Corrigan 0-1, P Kirwan 0-1.	Referee: G Ryan (Tipperary)

14 November 1982	Cork	3-10 - 0-17	Clare	Páirc Uí Chaoimh, Cork
	K Hennessy 1-2, J Barry-Murphy 1-1, P Horgan 0-4, C Ryan 1-0, B Óg Murphy 0-2, S O'Leary 0-1.		G McInerney 0-9, P Morey 0-2, J Callinan 0-2, E O'Connor 0-1, S Nugent 0-1, J Shannon 0-1, C Honan 0-1.	Referee: J Moloney (Tipperary)

14 November 1982	Waterford	1-8 - 0-10	Offaly	Fraher Field, Dungarvan
	T Casey 0-5, J Greene 1-1, Mossy Walsh 0-1, Michael Walsh 0-1.		P Delaney 0-5, M Corrigan 0-2, G Coughlan 0-1, J Kelly 0-1, B Bermingham 0-1.	Referee: L Horgan (Cork)

14 November 1982	Kilkenny	1-5 - 0-7	Wexford	Nowlan Park, Kilkenny
	J Hennessy 1-1, B Fitzpatrick 0-1, L Fennelly 0-1, J Fennelly 0-1, N Brennan 0-1.		S Kinsella 0-4, J Murphy 0-1, J Holohan 0-1, L Bennett 0-1.	Referee: J Landers (Waterford)

14 November 1982	Galway	4-7 - 1-5	Tipperary	Duggan Park, Ballinasloe
	B Lynskey 2-0, J Murphy 1-3, B Forde 1-0, PJ Molloy 0-2, I Clarke 0-1, S Linnane 0-1.		N English 1-1, S Bourke 0-3, P Looby 0-1.	Referee: J Rankisn (Laois)

21 November 1982	Cork	2-14 - 1-10	Tipperary	Páirc Uí Chaoimh, Cork
	B Óg Murphy 1-4, E O'Donoghue 1-2, J Barry-Murphy 0-3, T O'Sullivan 0-2, T Cashman 0-1, T Finn 0-1, T Crowley 0-1.		M Doyle 1-1, J Carey 0-4, S Bourke 0-4, N English 0-1.

28 November 1982	Wexford	1-10 - 0-6	Cork	Wexford Park, Wexford
	S Kinsella 1-2, M Jacob 0-5, T Doran 0-1, J Holohan 0-1, P Courtney 0-1.		B Óg Murphy 0-3, T O'Sullivan 0-3.	Referee: P Long (Kilkenny)

28 November 1982	Tipperary	1-9 - 3-10	Kilkenny	Semple Stadium, Thurles
	N English 1-1, P Dooley 0-2, J Carey 0-2, B Heffernan 0-1, M Doyle 0-1, J Flanagan 0-1, I Conroy 0-1.		B Fitzpatrick 2-6, C Heffernan 1-0, P Purcell 0-1, L Fennelly 0-1, H Ryan 0-1, N Brennan 0-1.	Referee: N Dalton (Waterford)

28 November 1982	Clare	1-9 - 0-16	Waterford	Cusack Park, Ennis
	G McInerney 1-3, T Nugent 0-2, J Callinan 0-1, S Shanahan 0-1, P Morey 0-1, E O'Connor 0-1.		T Casey 0-8, S Breen 0-3, Michael Walsh 0-2, Mossy Walsh 0-1, P Ryan 0-1, J Greene 0-1.	Referee: S Brennan (Galway)

28 November 1982	Offaly	0-7 - 1-13	Galway	O'Connor Park, Tullamore
	P Carroll 0-2, P Horan 0-2, M Corrigan 0-2, A Fogarty 0-1.		PJ Molloy 0-5, B Lynskey 1-0, I Clarke 0-3, M Connolly 0-2, S Linnane 0-2, P Piggott 0-1.	Referee: G Ryan (Tipperary)

27 February 1983	Galway	0-10 - 4-9	Kilkenny	St. Brendan's Park, Loughrea
	J Murphy 0-3, F Burke 0-2, N Lane 0-2, PJ Molloy 0-1, A Staunton 0-1, M Connolly 0-1.		C Heffernan 2-1, B Fitzpatrick 1-4, L Fennelly 1-3, P Lannon 0-1.	Referee: S O'Grady (Limerick)

27 February 1983	Tipperary	0-6 - 3-15	Wexford	Semple Stadium, Thurles
	M McGrath 0-5, M Doyle 0-1.		T Doran 3-1, M Jacob 0-4, S O'Leary 0-3, M Quigley 0-2, J Fleming 0-2, P Courtney 0-1, G O'Connor 0-1, J Murphy 0-1.	Referee: J Rankins (Laois)

27 February 1983	Offaly	1-7 - 2-11	Clare	St. Brendan's Park, Birr
	P Cleary 1-0, P Horan 0-2, B Keeshan 0-1, G Coughlan 0-1, P Carroll 0-1, B Bermingham 0-1.		G McInerney 0-5, K McNamara 1-0, J Callinan 1-0, S Fitzpatrick 0-3, D O'Connor 0-2, J Tracey 0-1.	Referee: J Denton (Wexford)

6 March 1983	Wexford	3-13 - 2-11	Offaly	O'Kennedy Park, New Ross
	S O'Leary 2-0, J Fleming 1-1, J Murphy 0-4, S Kinsella 0-3, G O'Connor 0-2, P Courtney 0-1, T Doran 0-1, J Walker 0-1.		P Horan 1-6, J Kelly 1-0, L Currams 0-2, P Kirwan 0-2, A Rosney 0-1.	Referee: N Dalton (Waterford)

6 March 1983	Clare	1-9 - 0-10	Tipperary	Cusack Park, Ennis
	G McInerney 1-2, S Fitzpatrick 0-2, J Shanahan 0-2, T Nugent 0-1, M Quane 0-1, J Callinan 0-1.		P Fitzell 0-4, M McGrath 0-3, J Kennedy 0-1, P Dooley 0-1, C Bonnar 0-1.	Referee: N Duggan (Limerick)

6 March 1983	Cork	1-16 - 2-11	Galway	Páirc Uí Chaoimh, Cork
	P Crowley 1-2, J Barry-Murphy 0-3, K Hennessy 0-3, B Óg Murphy 0-2, T O'Sullivan 0-2, T Cashman 0-1, D Walsh 0-1.		PJ Molloy 1-5, B Forde 1-1, F Burke 0-2, N Lane 0-1, I Clarke 0-1, J Murphy 0-1.	Referee: G Ryan (Tipperary)

6 March 1983	Kilkenny	2-18 - 2-4	Waterford	Nowlan Park, Kilkenny
	L Fennelly 1-3, C Heffernan 1-1, J Hennessy 0-4, H Ryan 0-3, G Fennelly 0-2, B Fitzpatrick 0-2, P Lannon 0-1, N Brennan 0-1, F Cummins 0-1.		Michael Walsh 1-1, J Greene 1-1, Mossy Walsh 0-1, T Maher 0-1.	Referee: G Kirwan (Offaly)

20 March 1983	Kilkenny	3-13 - 0-11	Cork	Nowlan Park, Kilkenny
	C Heffernan 2-4, B Fitzpatrick 1-4, G Fennelly 0-2, H Ryan 0-2, P Prendergast 0-1.		T O'Sullivan 0-3, B Óg Murphy 0-3, P Horgan 0-2, P Crowley 0-2, J Barry-Murphy 0-1.	Referee: N O'Donoghue (Dublin)

20 March 1983	Tipperary	1-7 - 0-8	Offaly	Semple Stadium, Thurles
	T Waters 1-1, R Callaghan 0-2, P McGrath 0-2, P Dooley 0-1, N English 0-1.		P Horan 0-5, J Kelly 0-1, L Currams 0-1, P Cleary 0-1.	Referee: M O'Flaherty (Cork)

20 March 1983	Waterford	1-11 - 1-14	Galway	Fraher Field, Dungarvan
	Michael Walsh 1-9, S Breene 0-1, T Maher 0-1.		PJ Molloy 0-8, A Staunton 1-1, F Burke 0-3, B Lynskey 0-2.	Referee: J Denton (Wexford)

20 March 1983	Clare	3-7 - 0-15	Wexford	Cusack Park, Ennis
	E O'Connor 1-0, G McInerney 1-0, C Honan 1-0, A Nugent 0-2, J Callinan 0-2, M Quane 0-1, V Donellan 0-1, J Shanahan 0-1.		S Kinsella 0-4, J Murphy 0-3, M Quigley 0-2, J Fleming 0-2, G O'Connor 0-2, P Courtney 0-1, S O'Leary 0-1.

27 March 1983	Waterford	3-10 - 1-16	Cork	Walsh Park, Waterford
	Michael Walsh 1-8, S Breen 1-1, P Bennett 1-1.		B Óg Murphy 0-6, J Barry-Murphy 1-1, J Buckley 0-3, P Horgan 0-2, B Murphy 0-1, K Hennessy 0-1, D Walsh 0-1, P Crowley 0-1.	Referee: J Denton (Wexford)

=== Play-off ===
27 March 1983 Play-off	Wexford	2-5 - 1-7	Clare	Semple Stadium, Thurles
	T Doran 1-0, J Walker 1-0, S Kinsella 0-2, M Quigley 0-1, G O'Connor 0-1, M Jacob 0-1.		G McInerney 1-2, C Honan 0-2, J Callinan 0-2, T Nugent 0-1.	Referee: N Duggan (Limerick)

=== Knock-out stage ===
Semi-finals

3 April 1983 Semi-final	Kilkenny	5-11 – 1-17	Laois	Semple Stadium, Thurles
	C Heffernan 3-1, P Lannon 1-1, N Brennan 1-1, B Fitzpatrick 0-2, H Ryan 0-2, G Fennelly 0-2, L Fennelly 0-1, F Cummins 0-1.		E Fennelly 0-7, T Flynn 1-1, PJ Cuddy 0-4, P Cleary 0-2, P O'Brien 0-1, C Jones 0-1, M Walsh 0-1.	Attendance: 7,200; Referee: J Moloney (Tipperary)

10 April 1983 Semi-final	Limerick	3-10 – 2-6	Wexford	Semple Stadium, Thurles
	M Rea 2-1, P Kelly 0-5, J McKenna 1-0, MJ Coffey 0-1, O o'Connor 0-1, D Fitzgerald 0-1, J Flanagan 0-1.		S Kinsella 1-2, T Doran 1-0, J Houlihan 0-1, G Coady 0-1, J Fleming 0-1, J Walker 0-1.	Attendance: 5,000; Referee: G Ryan (Tipperary)

Final

24 April 1983 Final	Kilkenny	2-14 – 2-12	Limerick	Semple Stadium, Thurles
	C Heffernan 1-1, H Ryan 1-1, G Fennelly 0-3, B Fitzpatrick 0-3, R Power 0-2, N Brennan 0-1, G Henderson 0-1, L Fennelly 0-1, S Fennelly 0-1.		P Kelly 0-6, M Rea 1-0, F Nolan 1-0, J McKenna 0-1, O O'Connor 0-1, MJ Coffey 0-1, J Flanagan 0-1, J Carroll 0-1, D Fitzgerald 0-1.	Attendance: 24,500; Referee: N Dalton (Waterford)

=== Scoring statistics ===
Top scorers overall

Rank	Player	Team	Tally	Total	Matches	Average
1	Billy Fitzpatrick	Kilkenny	4-33	45	9	5.00
2	Christy Heffernan	Kilkenny	11-11	44	9	4.88
3	P. J. Molloy	Galway	3-30	39	7	5.57
4	Gerry McInerney	Clare	5-23	38	8	4.75
5	Seán Kinsella	Wexford	3-26	35	8	4.37
6	Michael Walsh	Waterford	3-21	30	7	4.28
7	Pádraig Horan	Offaly	2-20	26	6	4.33
8	Tom Casey	Waterford	1-21	24	4	6.00
9	Bertie Óg Murphy	Cork	1-20	23	6	3.83
10	Tony Doran	Wexford	5-06	21	7	3.00

Top scorers in a single game

Rank	Player	Team	Tally	Total	Opposition
1	Billy Fitzpatrick	Kilkenny	2-06	12	Tipperary
1	Michael Walsh	Waterford	1-09	12	Galway
3	Michael Walsh	Waterford	1-08	11	Cork
4	Tony Doran	Wexford	3-01	10	Tipperary
4	Christy Heffernan	Kilkenny	3-01	10	Laois
4	Christy Heffernan	Kilkenny	2-04	10	Cork
7	Pat Morey	Clare	3-00	9	Kilkenny
7	Pádraig Horan	Offaly	1-06	9	Wexford
7	Gerry McInerney	Clare	0-09	9	Cork
10	Tom Casey	Waterford	1-05	8	Wexford
10	P. J. Molloy	Galway	1-05	8	Cork
10	Seán Kinsella	Wexford	1-05	8	Waterford
10	P. J. Molloy	Galway	1-05	8	Clare
10	Tom Casey	Waterford	0-08	8	Clare
10	P. J. Molloy	Galway	0-08	8	Waterford

== Division 2 ==
National Hurling League Division 2
- Season: 1982-83
- Champions: Limerick
- Promoted: Laois
- Relegated: Carlow
- Matches played: 28
- All statistics correct as of 5 March 2017.

On 27 March 1983, Limerick won the title after a 2-16 to 1-7 win over Antrim in the final round of the group stage.

Laois secured promotion to the top flight as the second-placed team. Carlow, who lost all of their group stage games, were relegated to Division 3.

=== Table ===
Pos	Team	Pld	W	D	L	Pts	Notes
1	Limerick	7	7	0	0	14	Division 2 champions
2	Laois	7	6	0	1	12	Promoted to Division 1
3	Antrim	7	4	0	3	8	
4	Kerry	7	4	0	3	8	
5	Dublin	7	4	0	3	8	
6	Westmeath	7	2	0	5	4	
7	Wicklow	7	1	0	6	2	
8	Carlow	7	0	0	7	0	Relegated to Division 3

== Division 3 ==
National Hurling League Division 3
- Season: 1982-83
- Champions: Kildare
- Relegated: Monaghan
- Matches played: 28
- All statistics correct as of 5 March 2017.

=== Table ===
Pos	Team	Pld	W	D	L	Pts	Notes
1	Kildare	7	6	0	1	12	Division 3 champions
2	Meath	7	4	1	2	9	
3	Roscommon	7	4	1	2	9	
4	Mayo	7	4	0	3	8	
5	Down	7	3	2	2	8	
6	Armagh	7	2	2	3	6	
7	Derry	7	2	0	5	4	
8	Monaghan	7	0	0	7	0	Relegated to Division 4

== Division 4 ==
National Hurling League Division 4
- Season: 1982-83
- Champions: Cavan
- All statistics correct as of 5 March 2017.

=== Table A ===
Pos	Team	Pld	W	D	L	Pts	Notes
1	Cavan	3	2	1	0	5	Division 4 champions
2	Fermanagh	3	2	1	0	5	
3	Louth	3	1	0	2	2	
4	Tyrone	3	0	0	3	0	

=== Table B ===
Pos	Team	Pld	W	D	L	Pts	Notes
1	Longford	3	3	0	0	6	
2	Donegal	3	2	0	1	4	
3	Sligo	3	1	0	2	2	
4	Leitrim	3	0	0	3	0	

=== Knock-out stage ===
Semi-finals

19 June 1983 Semi-final	Cavan	3-13 - 0-3	Longford	Páirc Seán Mac Diarmada, Carrick

19 June 1983 Semi-final	Fermanagh	2-12 - 3-5	Donegal	Páirc Seán Mac Diarmada, Carrick

Finals

3 July 1983 Final	Cavan	4-3 - 1-12	Fermanagh	St. Tiernach's Park, Clones

17 July 1983 Final replay	Cavan	4-8 - 1-8	Fermanagh	St. Tiernach's Park, Clones
