= 1985–86 National Hurling League =

55th season of the National Hurling League

League details
- Dates: 6 October 1985 – 13 July 1986
- Teams: 32

League champions
- Winners: Kilkenny (7th win)

Other division winners
- Division 2: Wexford
- Division 3: Mayo
- Division 4: Monaghan

The 1985–86 National Hurling League (known as the Ford National Hurling League for sponsorship reasons) was the 55th season of the National Hurling League.

== Division 1 ==
National Hurling League Division 1
- Season: 1985-86
- Champions: Kilkenny; 7th National League title Captain: Frank Holohan; Manager: Pat Henderson
- Relegated: Dublin; Laois
- Matches played: 34
- Top goalscorer: Ger Fennelly (1-47)
- Biggest home win: Galway 0-25 - 0-10 Cork (20 October 1985)
- Biggest away win: Cork 4-11 - 1-7 Limerick (17 November 1985)
- Highest scoring: Dublin 4-17 - 3-7 Laois (3 November 1985)
- All statistics correct as of 24 February 2017.

Limerick came into the season as defending champions of the 1984-85 season. Clare and Dublin entered Division 1 as the promoted teams.

On 11 May 1986, Kilkenny won the title following a 3-11 to 2-5 win over Galway in the final. It was their first league title since 1982-83 and their 7th National League title overall.

Dublin and Laois were relegated from Division 1.

Kilkenny's Ger Fennelly was the Division 1 top scorer with 1-47.

=== Table ===
| Pos | Team | Pld | W | D | L | Pts | Notes |
|---|---|---|---|---|---|---|---|
| 1 | Cork | 7 | 5 | 0 | 2 | 12 | |
| 2 | Galway | 7 | 5 | 0 | 2 | 12 | National Hurling League runner-up |
| 3 | Kilkenny | 7 | 4 | 1 | 2 | 9 | National Hurling League champions |
| 4 | Limerick | 7 | 4 | 0 | 3 | 8 | |
| 5 | Clare | 7 | 3 | 0 | 4 | 6 | |
| 6 | Offaly | 7 | 3 | 0 | 4 | 6 | |
| 7 | Dublin | 7 | 2 | 1 | 4 | 5 | Relegated to Division 2 |
| 8 | Laois | 7 | 1 | 0 | 6 | 2 | Relegated to Division 2 |

=== Group stage ===
| 6 October 1985 | Cork | 1-20 - 4-5 | Clare | Páirc Uí Chaoimh, Cork |
| | T O'Sullivan 0-10, J Barry-Murphy 1-1, G Fitzgerald 0-3, P Buckley 0-2, J Buckley 0-2, K Kingston 0-1, B Horgan 0-1. | | S Dolan 2-0, J Callanan 1-0, S Fitzpatrick 1-0, C Lyons 0-3, A Cunningham 0-1, V Donnellan 0-1. | Referee: T Murray (Limerick) |

| 6 October 1985 | Limerick | 2-9 - 4-7 | Offaly | Gaelic Grounds, Limerick |
| | L Garvey 2-1, P Kelly 0-6, M Carroll 0-1, R Sampson 0-1. | | P Cleary 2-0, P Horan 1-2, P Corrigan 1-1, M Corrigan 0-2, D Owens 0-2. | Referee: W Horgan (Cork) |

| 6 October 1985 | Dublin | 1-9 - 0-16 | Galway | Croke Park, Dublin |
| | G Galvin 0-4, J Morris 1-0, M Ryan 0-2, J Twomey 0-1, P Mulhare 0-1, S Dalton 0-1. | | PJ Molloy 0-9, M McGrath 0-4, S Linnane 0-1, P Finnerty 0-1, A Cunningham 0-1. | Referee: G Lonergan (Tipperary) |

| 6 October 1985 | Kilkenny | 1-13 - 0-7 | Laois | Nowlan Park, Kilkenny |
| | L Fennelly 1-0, J Murphy 0-3, G Fennelly 0-3, H Ryan 0-3, R Power 0-2, P Walsh 0-2. | | E Fennelly 0-3, M O'Sullivan 0-2, C Jones 0-2. |

| 20 October 1985 | Clare | 1-16 - 0-5 | Dublin | Cusack Park, Ennis |
| | V Donnellan 0-5, T Guilfoyle 1-1, C Lyons 0-3, S Fitzpatrick 0-2, P Lynch 0-1, A Cunningham 0-1, S Mahon 0-1, J Callanan 0-1, S Dolan 0-1. | | M Ryan 0-2, P Mulhare 0-1, J Morris 0-1, D Dalton 0-1. | Referee: N Duggan (Limerick) |

| 20 October 1985 | Laois | 1-9 - 4-8 | Limerick | O'Moore Park, Portlaoise |
| | M Walsh 1-1, M o'Sullivan 0-3, E Fennelly 0-2, O Cross 0-1, P Delaney 0-1, P O'Brien 0-1. | | O O'Connor 1-2, R Sampson 1-2, A Garvey 1-1, P McCarthy 1-0, P Kelly 0-3. | Referee: P Long (Kilkenny) |

| 20 October 1985 | Galway | 0-25 - 0-10 | Cork | Pearse Stadium, Salthill |
| | PJ Molloy 0-5, A Cunningham 0-5, B Mahon 0-3, N Lane 0-3, M Naughten 0-2, J Cooney 0-2, S Linnane 0-2, B Lynskey 0-2, M McGrath 0-1. | | T O'Sullivan 0-6, K Hennessy 0-1, D Walsh (St. Catherine's) 0-1, J Fenton 0-1, J O'Callaghan 0-1. | Referee: N O'Donoghue (Dublin) |

| 20 October 1985 | Offaly | 3-13 - 2-14 | Kilkenny | St. Brendan's Park, Birr |
| | P Cleary 2-1, J Dooley 1-3, P Corrigan 0-6, B Bermingham 0-1, M Corrisgn 0-1, B Keeshan 0-1. | | G Fennelly 0-8, L Fennelly 2-0, H Ryan 0-3, J Murphy 0-1, L Ryan 0-1, P Walshe 0-1. | Referee: S Ryan (Tipperary) |

| 3 November 1985 | Kilkenny | 2-9 - 0-9 | Galway | Nowlan Park, Kilkenny |
| | G Fennelly 1-7, J Hennessy 0-2. | | PJ Molloy 0-5, A Cunningham 0-1, S Linnane 0-1, S Mahon 0-1, M McGrath 0-1. | Referee: W Horgan (Cork) |

| 3 November 1985 | Cork | 2-17 - 1-11 | Offaly | Páirc Uí Chaoimh, Cork |
| | T O'Sullivan 0-9, J Fenton 1-3, D Walsh (St. Finbarr's) 1-1, K Hennessy 0-2, J Meyler 0-1, J Barry-Murphy 0-1, | | P Horan 0-5, J Dooley 1-0, M Coughlan 0-2, D Owens 0-1, J Kelly 0-1, D Fogarty 0-1, S Byrne 0-1. | Referee: G Long (Tipperary) |

| 3 November 1985 | Dublin | 4-17 - 3-7 | Laois | Croke Park, Dublin |
| | S McDermott 2-7, J Morris 1-1, L Byrne 0-4, J Twomey 0-1, J Murphy 0-1, M Ryan 0-1, S Dalton 0-1, M Hurley 0-1. | | P Critchley 1-1, M Walsh 1-1, M Ahearne 1-0, J Phelan 1-0 (og), C Jones 0-3, E Fennelly 0-2. | Referee: J Denton (Wexford) |

| 3 November 1985 | Limerick | 2-8 - 2-21 | Clare | Gaelic Grounds, Limerick |
| | P Kelly 0-6, L Garvey 1-0, P McCarthy 1-0, M Melligan 0-1, O O'Connor 0-1. | | V Donnellan 0-12, J Callanan 2-1, S Fitzpatrick 0-3, C Lyons 0-3, P Lynch 0-2. | Referee: G Kirwan (Offaly) |

| 17 November 1985 | Clare | 2-12 - 3-10 | Offaly | Cusack Park, Ennis |
| | S Fitzpatrick 1-1, C Lyons 0-4, V Donnellan 0-4, S Dolan 1-0, M Meehan 0-2, T Guilfoyle 0-1. | | P Corrigan 1-8, J Dooley 1-1, D Fogarty 1-0, P Horan 0-1. | Referee: T Murray (Limerick) |

| 17 November 1985 | Laois | 0-8 - 3-6 | Galway | O'Moore Park, Portlaoise |
| | E Fennelly 0-4, J Phelan 0-1, W Kirwan 0-1, P Critchley 0-1, M O'Sullivan 0-1. | | M Connolly 2-0, B Forde 1-0, J Cooney 0-3, PJ Molloy 0-2, M McGrath 0-1. | Referee: JF Bailey (Dublin) |

| 17 November 1985 | Limerick | 1-7 - 4-11 | Cork | Gaelic Grounds, Limerick |
| | B O'Connor 1-0, D Fitzgerald 0-3, P Kelly 0-2, P McCarthy 0-1, L Garvey 0-1. | | J Barry-Murphy 2-1, J Meyler 1-2, D Walsh 1-1, F Delaney 0-3, J Fenton 0-2, K Hennessy 0-1, J Cashman 0-1. | Referee: J Moore (Waterford) |

| 17 November 1985 | Dublin | 1-10 - 0-13 | Kilkenny | Croke Park, Dublin |
| | S McDermott 0-5, J Kearns 1-0, J Twomey 0-2, L Dalton 0-2, L Byrne 0-1. | | G Fennelly 0-7, B Fitzpatrick 0-3, C Heffernan 0-2, J Murphy 0-1. | Referee: P Delaney (Laois) |

| 9 February 1986 | Cork | 3-10 - 2-10 | Laois | Páirc Uí Chaoimh, Cork |
| | T Mulcahy 2-0, T O'Sullivan 0-6, K Kingston 1-0, D Walsh (St. Finbarr's) 0-3, J Fenton 0-1. | | E Fennelly 0-6, P Critchley 1-1, S Plunkett 1-0, M Walsh 0-1, M Ahearne 0-1, J Taylor 0-1. | Referee: F Murphy (Cork) |

| 9 February 1986 | Kilkenny | 1-17 - 2-9 | Clare | Nowlan Park, Kilkenny |
| | J Mulcahy 0-7, K Brennan 0-4, L Fennelly 1-0, G Fennelly 0-2, B Fitzpatrick 0-2, C Heffernan 0-1, MJ Ryan 0-1. | | P Lynch 2-0, C Lyons 0-4, V Donnellan 0-3, S McMahon 0-1, S Dolan 0-1. | Referee: J Moore (Waterford) |

| 9 February 1986 | Galway | 2-10 - 5-6 | Limerick | St. Brendan's Park, Loughrea |
| | S Linnane 0-7, J Cooney 1-0, M McGrath 1-0, M Connolly 0-1, PJ Molloy 0-1, B Lynskey 0-1. | | P McCqrthy 2-0, P Kelly 0-5, D Fitzgerald 1-1, S Fitzgibbon 1-0, L Garvey 1-0. | Referee: G Ryan (Tipperary) |

| 23 February 1986 | Dublin | 2-6 - 3-4 | Cork | Croke Park, Dublin |
| | V Holden 2-1, M Ryan 0-3, D Murphy 0-1, L Byrne 0-1. | | J Fenton 2-1, J Meyler 1-0, J Barry-Murphy 0-1, K Hennessy 0-1, T O'Sullivan 0-1. | Referee: J Denton (Wexford) |

| 23 February 1986 | Laois | 2-8 - 1-8 | Offaly | O'Moore Park, Portlaoise |
| | W Kirwan 1-1, S Plunkett 1-0, E Fennelly 0-2, M Hearne 0-2, J Delaney 0-1, P Critchley 0-1, C Hyland 0-1. | | M Corrigan 0-6, P Cleary 1-0, J Dooley 0-1, L Carroll 0-1. | Referee: G Ryan (Tipperary) |

| 23 February 1986 | Kilkenny | 3-4 - 0-15 | Limerick | Nowlan Park, Kilkenny |
| | K Brennan 1-2, J Mulcahy 1-0, B Fitzpatrick 1-0, R Power 0-1, L Walsh 0-1. | | P Kelly 0-10, D Fitzgerald 0-3, L Garvey 0-1, B Carroll 0-1. | Referee: F Murphy (Cork) |

| 23 February 1986 | Galway | 0-12 - 0-5 | Clare | Duggan Park, Ballinasloe |
| | J Cooney 0-4, A Cunningham 0-3, N Lane 0-2, PJ Molloy 0-1, M McGrath 0-1, M Connolly 0-1. | | T Guilfoyle 0-1, S Dolan 0-1, N O'Grady 0-1, J Callanan 0-1, C Lyons 0-1. | Referee: T Murray (Limerick) |

| 9 March 1986 | Cork | 3-7 - 3-10 | Kilkenny | Páirc Uí Chaoimh, Cork |
| | J Barry-Murphy 2-0, J Meyler 1-1, T O'Sullivan 0-3, D Walsh (St. Finbarr's) 0-1, J Fenton 0-1, P Hartnett 0-1. | | K Brenann 1-2, G Fennelly 0-5, L Fennelly 1-0, B Fitzpatrick 1-0, R Power 0-2, J Mulcahy 0-1. | Referee: T Murray (Limerick) |

| 9 March 1986 | Clare | 1-11 - 1-5 | Laois | Cusack Park, Ennis |
| | C Lyons 1-6, V Donnellan 0-3, P Lynch 0-1, J Moroney 0-1. | | P Critchley 1-0, W Kirwan 0-3, J Phelan 0-1, S Plunkett 0-1. | Referee: JJ Corcoran (Galway) |

| 9 March 1986 | Limerick | 4-7 - 0-10 | Dublin | Gaelic Grounds, Dublin |
| | P McCarthy 2-0, D Fitzgerald 1-1, S Fitzgibbon 1-0, P Kelly 0-4, L Tobin 0-1, B Carroll 0-1. | | S McDermott 0-4, S Dalton 0-2, L Byrne 0-1, C Hannebry 0-1, JD Murphy 0-1, M O'Riordan 0-1. | Referee: W Horgan (Cork) |

| 9 March 1986 | Offaly | 0-9 - 1-10 | Galway | St. Brendan's Park, Birr |
| | P Corrigan 0-6, J Dooley 0-2, D Owens 0-1. | | J Cooney 0-5, M Connolly 1-1, S Mahon 0-2, N Lane 0-1, PJ Molloy 0-1. |

=== Knock-out stage ===
Quarter-finals

| 13 April 1986 Quarter-final | Wexford | 2-12 - 1-10 | Limerick | O'Moore Park, Portlaoise |
| | J Houlihan 1-5, M Storey 1-1, Martin Fitzhenry 0-2, T Dunne 0-1, J O'Connor 0-1, B Byrne 0-1, S Whelan 0-1. | | P Kelly 0-7, B Carroll 1-0, R Sampson 0-2, D Fitzgerald 0-1. | Referee: G Ryan (Tipperary) |

| 13 April 1986 Quarter-final | Kilkenny | 3-8 - 0-15 | Westmeath | O'Moore Park, Portlaoise |
| | J O'Hara 2-0, G Fennelly 0-5, L Fennelly 1-0, L Ryan 0-2, B Fitzpatrick 0-1. | | D Kilcoyne 0-7, E Gallagher 0-3, M Cosgrove 0-2, S Kilcoyne 0-2, P Curran 0-1. | Referee: P Delaney (Laois) |

Semi-finals

| 27 April 1986 Semi-final | Kilkenny | 2-15 – 1-8 | Cork | Semple Stadium, Thurles |
| | L Ryan 2-1, K Brennan 0-5, G Fennelly 0-5, R Power 0-1, C Heffernan 0-1, L Fennelly 0-1, B Walton 0-1. | | T O'Sullivan 0-4, K Kingston 1-0, G Fitzgerald 0-2, T Mulcahy 0-1, P Horgan 0-1. | Referee: J Denton (Wexford) |

| 27 April 1986 Semi-final | Galway | 1-16 – 3-10 | Wexford | Semple Stadium, Thurles |
| | J Cooney 1-3, PJ Molloy 0-6, A Cunningham 0-3, S Linnane 0-2, B Forde 0-1, S Mahon 0-1. | | T Dempsey 2-1, J Houlihan 0-5, M Storey 1-1, S Whelan 0-1, S Fitzhenry 0-1, J Barron 0-1. | Referee: JF Bailey (Dublin) |

| 4 May 1986 Semi-final replay | Galway | 3-11 – 2-5 | Wexford | Semple Stadium, Thurles |
| | N Lane 2-1, PJ Molloy 0-4, M Connolly 1-0, J Cooney 0-2, M Naughton 0-2, A Cunningham 0-1, B Forde 0-1. | | T Dempsey 1-1, T Byrne 1-0, J Houlihan 0-2, P Courtney 0-1, S Fitzhenry 0-1. | Referee: JF Bailey (Dublin) |

Final

| 11 May 1986 Final | Kilkenny | 2-10 – 2-6 | Galway | Semple Stadium, Thurles |
| | G Fennelly 0-5, L Fennelly 1-0, C Heffernan 1-0, J O'Hara 0-1, K Brennan 0-1, P Walsh 0-1, L Ryan 0-1, J Mulcahy 0-1. | | N Lane 1-1, C Hayes 1-0, J Cooney 0-2, PJ Molloy 0-1, A Cunningham 0-1, M McGrath 0-1. | Attendance: 18,276; Referee: F Murphy (Cork) |

=== Scoring statistics ===
| Rank | Player | Team | Tally | Total | Matches | Average |
|---|---|---|---|---|---|---|
| 1 | Ger Fennelly | Kilkenny | 1-47 | 50 | 10 | 5.00 |
| 2 | Paddy Kelly | Limerick | 0-43 | 43 | 8 | 5.37 |
| 3 | Tony O'Sullivan | Cork | 0-39 | 39 | 8 | 4.87 |
| 4 | P. J. Molloy | Galway | 0-35 | 35 | 10 | 3.50 |
| 5 | Val Donnellan | Galway | 0-28 | 28 | 7 | 4.00 |
| 6 | Paddy Corrigan | Offaly | 2-21 | 27 | 5 | 5.40 |
| 6 | Joe Cooney | Galway | 2-21 | 27 | 10 | 2.70 |
| 6 | Cyril Lyons | Clare | 1-24 | 27 | 7 | 3.85 |
| 9 | Liam Fennelly | Kilkenny | 7-01 | 22 | 10 | 2.20 |
| 9 | Seán McDermott | Dublin | 2-16 | 22 | 4 | 5.50 |

Top scorers in a single game

| Rank | Player | Team | Tally | Total | Opposition |
|---|---|---|---|---|---|
| 1 | Seán McDermott | Dublin | 2-07 | 13 | Laois |
| 2 | Val Donnellan | Clare | 0-12 | 12 | Limerick |
| 3 | Paddy Corrigan | Offaly | 1-08 | 11 | Clare |
| 4 | Ger Fennelly | Kilkenny | 1-07 | 10 | Galway |
| 4 | Tony O'Sullivan | Cork | 0-10 | 10 | Clare |
| 4 | Paddy Kelly | Limerick | 0-10 | 10 | Kilkenny |
| 7 | Cyril Lyons | Clare | 1-06 | 9 | Laois |
| 7 | P. J. Molloy | Galway | 0-09 | 9 | Dublin |
| 7 | Tony O'Sullivan | Cork | 0-09 | 9 | Galway |
| 10 | John Holohan | Wexford | 1-05 | 8 | Limerick |
| 10 | Ger Fennelly | Kilkenny | 0-08 | 8 | Offaly |

== Division 2 ==
National Hurling League Division 2
- Season: 1985-86
- Champions: Wexford
- Promoted: Westmeath
- Relegated: Down; Roscommon
- Matches played: 28
- Biggest home win: Wexford 8-11 - 1-6 Roscommon (20 October 1985)
- Biggest away win: Antrim 5-13 - 1-7 Kerry (2 March 1985)
- Highest scoring: Antrim 4-15 - 3-12 Roscommon (23 February 1986)
- All statistics correct as of 24 February 2017.

Down, Meath, Tipperary and Wexford entered Division 2 as the promoted and relegated teams from the previous season.

On 9 March 1986, Wexford secured the title following a 3-15 to 1-5 win over Kerry in the final round of the group stage. Westmeath secured promotion to Division 1 as the second-placed team.

Down and Roscommon were relegated from Division 2.

=== Table ===
| Pos | Team | Pld | W | D | L | Pts | Notes |
|---|---|---|---|---|---|---|---|
| 1 | Wexford (C) | 7 | 6 | 1 | 0 | 13 | Promoted to Division 1 |
| 2 | Westmeath | 7 | 6 | 0 | 1 | 12 | Promoted to Division 1 |
| 3 | Tipperary | 7 | 5 | 0 | 2 | 10 | |
| 4 | Antrim | 7 | 4 | 1 | 2 | 9 | |
| 5 | Kerry | 7 | 3 | 0 | 4 | 6 | |
| 6 | Meath | 7 | 2 | 0 | 5 | 4 | |
| 7 | Roscommon | 7 | 0 | 1 | 6 | 1 | Relegated to Division 3 |
| 8 | Down | 7 | 0 | 1 | 6 | 1 | Relegated to Division 3 |

=== Group stage ===
| 6 October 1985 | Antrim | 1-13 - 2-10 | Wexford | Casement Park, Belfast |
| | D Donnelly 1-6, C McVeigh 0-4, P McKillen 0-1, D McNaughton 0-1, C Donnelly 0-1. | | J Holohan 1-7, J Fleming 1-1, B Byrne 0-1, T Dempsey 0-1. | Referee: JF Bailey (Dublin) |

| 6 October 1985 | Roscommon | 0-9 - 0-17 | Tipperary | Athleague Sportsfield, Athleague |
| | P Doran 0-5, W Depinna 0-3, S Kilroy 0-1. | | N English 0-7, G O'Neill 0-3, L Maher 0-3, A Ryan 0-2, P Kennedy 0-1, MJ Russell 0-1. | Referee: P Horan (Offaly) |

| 6 October 1985 | Meath | 1-13 - 1-5 | Down | St. Loman's Park, Trim |
| | F McCann 1-5, D O'Keeffe 0-5, N Molloy 0-1, M Smith 0-1, P Gannon 0-1. | | B Rorr 1-1, A Mageehan 0-2, N Fanda 0-1, S Fay 0-1. | Referee: P Casey (Westmeath) |

| 6 October 1985 | Westmeath | 1-11 - 0-8 | Kerry | Collinstown |
| | D Kilcoyne 0-5, E Gallagher 1-1, M Kilcoyne 0-2, E Dolan 0-1, M Cosgrave 0-1, B McCabe 0-1. | | P Nolan 0-6, G O'Sullivan 0-2. | Referee: P Delaney (Laois) |

| 20 October 1985 | Tipperary | 1-18 - 1-10 | Antrim | Semple Stadium, Thurles |
| | P Kennedy 1-4, N English 0-5, S Power 0-4, M Scully 0-2, J McGrath 0-1, G O'Neill 0-1, A Ryan 0-1. | | T McGrath 1-1, C Donnelly 0-3, B Donnelly 0-2, D Donnelly 0-2, D McNaughton 0-2. |

| 20 October 1985 | Down | 2-9 - 2-16 | Westmeath | McKenna Park, Ballycran |
| | S Fay 1-6, D Hughes 1-1, G Fitzsimons 0-2. | | D Kilcoyne 0-8, E Gallaher 2-1, S Kilcoyne 0-2, M Kilcoyne 0-3, M Kilcoyne 0-2. |

| 20 October 1985 | Wexford | 8-11 - 1-6 | Roscommon | Enniscorthy |
| | B Byrne 3-1, J Fleming 3-0, J Holohan 1-2, J Murphy 1-0, M Storey 0-2, M Connors 0-2, G O'Connor 0-1, J O'Connor 0-1, P Courtney 0-1, T Dempsey 0-1. | | P Dolan 0-5, H Crowley 1-0, P Flynn 0-1. |

| 20 October 1985 | Kerry | 2-6 - 0-10 | Meath | Austin Stack Park, Tralee |
| | S Flaherty 1-3, P McMahon 1-0, C Walsh 0-2, J O'Sullivan 0-1. | | F McCann 0-4, T Ferguson 0-3, P Farrell 0-1, A Kirby 0-1, N Molloy 0-1. |

| 3 November 1985 | Westmeath | 1-18 - 1-11 | Tipperary | Cusack Park, Mullingar |
| | D Kilcoyne 1-8, M Cosgrave 0-3, M Kilcoyne 0-2, M Hickey 0-1, P Clancy 0-1, D McCormack 0-1, S Kilcoyne 0-1, E Gallagher 0-1. | | M Scully 0-7, G O'Neill 1-0, E O'Shea 0-2, N English 0-1, D O'Connell 0-1. | Referee: J Corcoran (Galway) |

| 3 November 1985 | Antrim | 5-9 - 1-7 | Down | Glenravel |
| | D Donnelly 2-3, T McGrath 1-1, C Donnelly 1-0, A McCarry 1-0, D McNaughten 0-3, P McKillen 0-1, B Donnelly 0-1. | | G Coulter 1-0, S Fay 0-2, D O'Prey 0-1, H Gilmore 0-1, M Bailey 0-1, M Mageean 0-1, N Sands 0-1. | Referee: M McCormack (Meath) |

| 3 November 1985 | Roscommon | 2-11 - 6-4 | Kerry | Athleague Sportsfield, Athleague |
| | S Kilroy 1-1, P Dolan 0-4, PJ Lynch 1-0, P Flynn 0-3, W Depinna 0-1, J Kelly 0-1, H Crowley 0-1. | | J McCarthy 2-1, C Walsh 1-1, P McMahon 1-0, S O'Shea 1-0, J O'Connell 1-0, T Halloran 0-1, M Conway 0-1. | Referee: M Quinn (Clare) |

| 3 November 1985 | Meath | 0-7 - 4-7 | Wexford | St. Loman's Park, Trim |
| | F McCann 0-4, B Tansey 0-2, N Smith 0-1. | | M Quigley 1-2, J Holohan 1-1, J Walker 1-0, B Byrne 1-0, P Courtney 0-3, J Murphy 0-1. | Referee: N O'Donoghue (Dublin) |

| 17 November 1985 | Westmeath | 3-21 - 0-5 | Roscommon | Cusack Park, Mullingar |
| | D Kilcoyne 1-11. |

| 17 November 1985 | Tipperary | 3-21 - 2-8 | Kerry | Semple Stadium, Thurles |
| | M Scully 1-9, N English 2-4, S Power 0-2, L Maher 0-2, P Kennedy 0-2, B Mannion 0-1, P Everard 0-1. | | J O'Sullivan 1-1, S O'Flaherty 0-4, J O'Connell 1-0, T Nolan 0-1, CWalsh 0-1, J Walsh 0-1. | Referee: K Walsh (Limerick) |

| 17 November 1985 | Down | 4-3 - 3-13 | Wexford | Mitchell Park, Ballygalget |

| 17 November 1985 | Antrim | 5-14 - 3-9 | Meath | Glenravel |

| 9 February 1986 | Tipperary | 2-16 - 0-5 | Meath | MacDonagh Park, Nenagh |

| 9 February 1986 | Wexford | 4-16 - 0-14 | Westmeath | Wexford Park, Wexford |

| 9 February 1986 | Roscommon | 1-10 - 2-7 | Down | Athleague Sportsfield, Athleague |

| 23 February 1986 | Wexford | 4-13 - 0-11 | Tipperary | Wexford Park, Wexford |

| 23 February 1986 | Antrim | 4-15 - 3-12 | Roscommon | Corrigan Park, Belfast |

| 23 February 1986 | Down | 2-3 - 3-5 | Kerry | Mitchell Park, Ballygalget |

| 2 March 1986 | Kerry | 1-7 - 5-13 | Antrim | Austin Stack Park, Tralee |

| 2 March 1986 | Meath | 0-7 - 1-16 | westmeath | St. Loman's Park, Trim |

| 9 March 1986 | Westmeath | 3-11 - 2-9 | Antrim | Cusack Park, Mullingar |

| 9 March 1986 | Roscommon | 1-6 - 1-7 | Meath | Athleague Sportsfield, Athleague |

| 9 March 1986 | Kerry | 1-5 - 3-15 | Wexford | Austin Stack Park, Tralee |

| 9 March 1986 | Tipperary | 5-12 - 1-5 | Down | Semple Stadium, Thurles |

== Division 3 ==
National Hurling League Division 3
- Season: 1985-86
- Champions: Mayo
- Promoted: Waterford
- Relegated: Louth
- All statistics correct as of 24 February 2017.

Kildare, Louth and Waterford entered Division 3 as the promoted and relegated teams from the previous season.

On 9 March 1986, Mayo secured the title following a 0-12 to 0-8 win over Armagh in the final round of the group stage. Waterford secured promotion to Division 2 as the second-placed team.

Louth were relegated from Division 3.

=== Table ===
| Pos | Team | Pld | W | D | L | Pts | Notes |
|---|---|---|---|---|---|---|---|
| 1 | Mayo (C) | 7 | 6 | 0 | 1 | 12 | Promoted to Division 2 |
| 2 | Waterford | 7 | 6 | 0 | 1 | 12 | Promoted to Division 2 |
| 3 | Armagh | 7 | 4 | 1 | 2 | 9 | |
| 4 | Wicklow | 7 | 3 | 0 | 4 | 6 | |
| 5 | Carlow | 7 | 3 | 0 | 4 | 6 | |
| 6 | Derry | 7 | 2 | 1 | 4 | 5 | |
| 7 | Kildare | 7 | 2 | 0 | 5 | 4 | |
| 8 | Louth | 7 | 1 | 0 | 6 | 2 | Relegated to Division 4 |

== Division Four ==
=== Knock-out stage ===
| 13 July 1986 Final | Monaghan | 5-5 - 2-7 | Longford | St. Loman's Park, Trim |
