= 1986 Kilkenny Senior Hurling Championship =

Annual hurling competition season

- Champions: Clara (1st title); Tom O'Shea (captain)
- Runners-up: Ballyhale Shamrocks; Mickey Kelly (captain)

The 1986 Kilkenny Senior Hurling Championship was the 92nd staging of the Kilkenny Senior Hurling Championship since its establishment by the Kilkenny County Board.

Ballyhale Shamrocks were the defending champions.

The final was played on 28 September 1986 at Nowlan Park in Kilkenny, between Clara and Ballyhale Shamocks, in what was their first ever meeting in the final. Clara won the match by 3-10 to 4-05 to claim their first ever championship title.

== Results ==
=== Final ===
28 September 1986 Final	Clara	3-10 - 4-05	Ballyhale Shamrocks	Nowlan Park
	A Prendergast 1-2, H Ryan 1-1, Lester Ryan 0-4, J Casey 1-0, T Ryan 0-1, S Whearty 0-1, G Nolan 0-1.		M Kelly 3-0, L Fennelly 1-0, G Fennelly 0-3, B Fennelly 0-1, M Fennelly 0-1.	Referee: D Butler (Threecastles)
