= 1975 All-Ireland Minor Hurling Championship =

All-Ireland Minor Hurling Championship 1975
Championship Details
- Dates: 9 May 1975 – 7 September 1975
- Teams: 13

All Ireland Champions
- Winners: Kilkenny (10th win)
- Captain: Harry Ryan

All Ireland Runners-up
- Runners-up: Cork
- Captain: Tom Cashman

Provincial Champions
- Munster: Cork
- Leinster: Kilkenny
- Ulster: Not Played
- Connacht: Not Played

Championship Statistics
- Top Scorer: John O'Sullivan (1-32)

The 1975 All-Ireland Minor Hurling Championship was the 45th staging of the All-Ireland Minor Hurling Championship since its establishment by the Gaelic Athletic Association in 1928. The championship began on 9 May 1975 and ended on 7 September 1975.

Cork entered the championship as the defending champions.

On 7 September 1975, Kilkenny won the championship following a 3-19 to 1-14 defeat of Cork in the All-Ireland final. This was their 10th All-Ireland title overall and their first title since 1973.

Cork's John O'Sullivan was the championship's top scorer with 1-32.

== Results ==
=== Leinster Minor Hurling Championship ===
29 June 1975 Quarter-final	Laois	1-08 - 4-05	Offaly	O'Moore Park, Portlaoise
	N Foynes 1-0, E Hearns 0-3, C Wall 0-2, W Bohane 0-1, J Kelly 0-1, D O'Loughlin 0-1.		S Walsh 3-0, O Minnock 1-0, M Flannery 0-2, N Bergin 0-2, B Brady 0-1.

Semi-finals

29 June 1975 Semi-final	Wexford	3-09 - 3-11	Dublin	Wexford Park, Wexford
	D Kavanagh 1-4, L Brown 1-2, H Martin 1-0, L Broderick 0-1, T Cook 0-1, J Quinn 0-1, S Mannion 0-1, P Delahunty 0-1.		G Flood 2-0, M Gordon 1-1, P Reddy 0-4, A Waters 0-2, B O'Connor 0-1, J Conran 0-1.

6 July 1975 Semi-final	Kilkenny	4-12 - 2-03	Offaly	Nowlan Park, Kilkenny
	P Buggy 2-0, J O'Brien 2-0, K Brennan 0-4, J Wall 0-3, P Prendergast 0-1, P Brennan 0-1, P Lennon 0-1, J Ryan 0-1, E Brennan 0-1.		M Bergin 1-0, B Brady 1-0, O Minnock 0-2, B Keeshin 0-1.

Final

3 August 1975 Final	Kilkenny	2-18 - 3-04	Dublin	Croke Park, Dublin
	K O'Shea 1-5, K Brennan 0-5, J Lennon 1-1, J Wall 0-3, J O'Brien 0-2, S Brennan 0-1, J Ryan 0-1.		L Browne 1-1, T Cooke 1-1, J Quinn 1-0, S Mannion 0-1, D Kavanagh 0-1.	Referee: N Matthews (Wexford)

=== Munster Minor Hurling Championship ===
First round

9 May 1975 First round	Waterford	0-05 - 4-08	Cork	Fraher Field, Dungarvan
	D Fitzpatrick 0-5.		John Murphy 2-0, Jimmy Murphy 1-1, G Hayes 1-1, P Crowley 0-2, D Herlihy 0-1, F Tobin 0-1, D Buckley 0-1, J O'Sullivan 0-1.	Referee: J Collins (Tipperary)

10 May 1975 First round	Kerry	2-06 - 3-10	Clare	Abbeydorney
	C Flaherty 0-5, J O'Sullivan 1-1, G Deenihan 1-0.

Semi-finals

29 June 1975 Semi-final	Cork	2-17 - 1-05	Clare	Gaelic Grounds, Limerick
	J O'Sullivan 0-8, C Daly 1-1, D Herlihy 0-4, F Tobin 1-0, John Murphy 0-2, T Cashman 0-1, P Crowley 0-1.		A Stritch 1-0, R McMahon 0-2, T McCarthy 0-2, J McMahon 0-1.	Referee: B Cross (Limerick)

6 July 1975 Semi-final	Tipperary	1-07 - 1-05	Limerick	Gaelic Grounds, Limerick
	S Kennedy 1-0, D Kelly 0-2, D Darcy 0-1, P Fitzelle 0-1, T Walsh 0-1, M Doyle 0-1, K Fox 0-1.		T Dunne 1-2, F McDonagh 0-2, D Broughan 0-1.

Final

27 July 1975 Final	Cork	3-16 - 1-07	Tipperary	Gaelic Grounds, Limerick
	J O'Sullivan 1-6, D Buckley 1-2, P Horgan 1-2, F Tobin 0-3, P Crowley 0-2, John Murphy 0-1.		P Fitzelle 1-2, S Burke 0-2, M Doyle 0-2, S Kennedy 0-1.	Referee: L O'Connor (Waterford)

=== All-Ireland Minor Hurling Championship ===
Quarter-final

6 July 1975 Quarter-final	Galway	10-18 - 0-02	Antrim	Páirc Chiaráin, Athlone
	G Kennedy 2-7, P Ryan 3-1, J Goode 1-6, J Curley 2-0, B Forde 1-1, S Davern 1-1, J Murphy 0-2, M Earls 0-1.		P McFaul 0-2.

Semi-final

17 August 1975 Semi-final	Cork	6-20 - 4-07	Galway	Croke Park, Dublin
	F Tobin 2-5, D Buckley 3-1, J O'Sullivan 0-7, J Murphy 1-0, P Horgan 0-3, Paul Crowley 0-2, D McCurtin 0-1, T Cashman 0-1.		G Kennedy 1-3, B Forde 1-2, J Goode 1-1, J Carley 1-0, P Ryan 0-1.	Referee: N McMahon (Wexford)

Final

7 September 1975 Final	Kilkenny	3-19 - 1-14	Cork	Croke Park, Dublin
	J Wall 1-3, P Lennon 0-5, P Brennan 1-1, J Ryan 1-1, K Brennan 0-4, K O'Shea 0-3, J O'Brien 0-2.		J O'Sullivan 0-10, P Horgan 1-0, J Murphy 0-1, T Cashman 0-1, D McCurtin 0-1, Paul Crowley 0-1.	Referee: J Rankins (Laois)

== Championship statistics ==
=== Top scorers ===
Top scorers overall

Rank	Player	Club	Tally	Total	Matches	Average
1	John O'Sullivan	Cork	1-32	35	5	7.00
2	G. Kennedy	Galway	3-10	19	2	9.50
3	Frank Tobin	Cork	3-09	18	5	3.60
4	Danny Buckley	Cork	4-04	16	5	3.20
5	J. Goode	Galway	2-07	13	2	6.50
5	Kieran Brennan	Kilkenny	0-13	13	3	4.33
