= 1977 All-Ireland Minor Hurling Championship =

All-Ireland Minor Hurling Championship 1977

All-Ireland Minor Hurling Championship 1977
All Ireland Champions
- Winners: Kilkenny (11th win)
- Captain: Seán Fennelly

All Ireland Runners-up
- Runners-up: Cork
- Captain: Stephen Hayes

Provincial Champions
- Munster: Cork
- Leinster: Kilkenny
- Ulster: Not Played
- Connacht: Not Played

The 1977 All-Ireland Minor Hurling Championship was the 47th staging of the All-Ireland Minor Hurling Championship since its establishment by the Gaelic Athletic Association in 1928.

Tipperary entered the championship as the defending champions, however, they were beaten by Clare in the Munster quarter-final.

On 9 October 1977 Kilkenny won the championship following a 1-8 to 0-9 defeat of Cork in a replay of the All-Ireland final. This was their 11th All-Ireland title and their first in two championship seasons.

== Results ==
=== Leinster Minor Hurling Championship ===
First round

10 April 1977 First round	Kildare	0-05 - 6-10	Laois	Geraldine Park, Athy
				Referee: L Barnes (Wicklow)

24 April 1977 First round	Westmeath	4-04 - 4-10	Antrim	Cusack Park, Mullingar
	S McKeogh 2-2, J Davis 1-0, I Connell 1-0, S McGrath 0-2.		D Donnelly 1-3, B Donnelly 1-3, E McToal 1-2, B Quinn 1-0, L McGoldrick 0-1, G McClafferty 0-1.

Quarter-finals

22 May 1977 Quarter-final	Offaly	0-10 - 2-03	Laois	St. Brendan's Park, Birr
	T Conneely 0-5, D Loughnane 0-2, D Owens 0-2, B Hayes 0-1.		N Broderick 1-0, D Conlon 1-0, P Bergin 0-2, P Critchley 0-1.

23 May 1977 Quarter-final	Dublin	1-10 - 3-06	Antrim	Parnell Park, Dublin
	T McSweeneny 0-5, J Morris 1-0, W Hughes 0-3, P Byrne 0-2.		D Donnelly 1-1, B McCallion 1-1, J McKernan 1-0, B Quinn 0-1, L McGoldrick 0-1, E McToal 0-1, V Caulfield 0-1.

Semi-finals

26 June 1977 Semi-final	Wexford	4-10 - 3-11	Antrim	Wexford Park, Wexford
	R O'Connor 2-0, G O'Connor 1-2, P Gorman 0-4, J Fleming 0-4, B Byrne 1-0.		B McCallion 2-0, G McCafferty 0-6, B Quinn 0-4, D Donnelly 1-0, B Donnelly 0-1.	Referee: S Murphy (Kilkenny)

6 July 1977 Semi-final	Kilkenny	4-20 - 3-11	Offaly	O'Moore Park, Portlaoise
	J Mulcahy 0-8, J Heffernan 1-2, M Nash 1-2, E Deegan 1-2, W McEvoy 0-4, E Crowley 1-0, G Ryan 0-2.		D Loughnane 1-5, T Kennedy 1-2, D Moloney 1-0, J Abbott 0-2, M Corrigan 0-1, L Collins 0-1.

Final

24 July 1977 Final	Kilkenny	5-10 - 3-06	Wexford	Croke Park, Dublin
	J Mulcahy 1-3, J McEvoy 1-2, J Heffernan 1-1, M Nash 1-1, E Crowley 1-1, B Wallace 0-2.		J Fleming 2-4, P Doyle 1-0, B Byrne 0-1, G O'Connor 0-1.	Referee: N O'Donoghue (Dublin)

=== Munster Minor Hurling Championship ===
First round

6 May 1977 First round	Waterford	1-09 - 0-04	Kerry	FitzGerald Park, Kilmallock
	J Hunt 0-6, J Cotter 1-0, B Hennessy 0-2, A Kelly 0-1.		T Ryan 0-4.	Referee: J Sheehan (Limerick)

11 May 1977 First round	Clare	3-04 - 1-08	Tipperary	Gaelic Grounds, Limerick
	PJ Deacy 1-2, F Quilligan 1-0, J Moran 1-0, C Lyons 0-1, L Quinlan 0-1.		M Murphy 1-3, P Power 0-2, R O'Callaghan 0-1, D O'Connell 0-1, E Cunningham 0-1.	Referee: S O'Connor (Limerick)

Semi-finals

27 May 1977 Semi-final	Cork	5-15 - 1-07	Waterford	Páirc Mac Gearailt, Fermoy
	J Hartnett 2-3, G O'Regan 0-8, J Monahan 2-1, T O'Connor 1-1, S O'Brien 0-1, R O'Connor 0-1.		A Kelly 1-1, J Hunt 0-2, P Curran 0-2, M Curley 0-1, J Fives 0-1.	Referee: B Carroll (Tipperary)

29 June 1977 Semi-final	Limerick	3-13 - 0-06	Clare	MacDonagh Park, Nenagh
	G Hickey 2-1, O O'Connor 0-6, S Herbert 1-1, K O'Brien 0-2, P Foley 0-1, B Ryan 0-1, J Mann 0-1.		J Hanley 0-4, L Quinlan 0-1, C Martin 0-1.

Final

10 July 1977 Final	Cork	2-08 - 2-07	Limerick	Semple Stadium, Thurles
	S O'Gorman 0-5, D Murphy 1-0, J Monahan 1-0, J Hartnett 0-1, A O'Connell 0-1, T O'Connor 0-1.		O O'Connor 1-1, M Coffey 1-1, K O'Brien 0-2, S Herbert 0-2, E Meskill 0-1.

=== All-Ireland Minor Hurling Championship ===
Semi-final

7 August 1977 Semi-final	Cork	3-14 - 1-06	Galway	Croke Park, Dublin
	R O'Connor 3-3, S O'Gorman 0-6, J Keane 0-1, A O'Connell 0-1, T McCarthy 0-1, J Murphy 0-1, D Philpott 0-1.		J Coen 1-4, M Ruane 0-1, M Fahy 0-1.

Finals

4 September 1977 Final	Cork	3-11 - 4-08	Kilkenny	Croke Park, Dublin
	J Hartnett 1-2, S O'Gorman 0-5, T Aherne 1-1, R O'Connor 1-1, J Keane 0-2.		J Heffernan 2-1, E Deegan 1-1, W McEvoy 1-0, E Wallace 0-2, J Mulcahy 0-2, G Ryan 0-1, E Crowley 0-1.	Referee: G Kirwan (Offaly)

9 October 1977 Final replay	Kilkenny	1-08 - 0-09	Cork	Semple Stadium, Thurles
	W McEvoy 1-1, T Lennon 0-2, E Deegan 0-2, E Crowley 0-1, R Murphy 0-1, J Mulcahy 0-1.		PJ Whooley 0-4, R O'Connor 0-2, S O'Gorman 0-1, T Aherne 0-1, T McCarthy 0-1.	Referee: G Kirwan (Offaly)

== Championship statistics ==
=== Miscellaneous ===
- The All-Ireland final ended in a draw for the first time since 1966.
