= P. J. Molloy =

Galway hurler

Personal information
- Native name: P. S. Ó Maolmhuaidh (Irish)
- Born: 30 April 1952 (age 74) Athenry, County Galway, Ireland
- Occupation: Company officer
- Height: 5 ft 8 in (173 cm)

Sport
- Sport: Hurling
- Position: Left wing-forward
Club
- Years: Club
- 1968–1995: Athenry
Club titles
- Galway titles: 2
- Connacht titles: 1
Inter-county*
Years	County	Apps (scores)
1971–1987	Galway	35 (11–114)
Inter-county titles
- All-Irelands: 2
- NHL: 1
- All Stars: 1
- *Inter County team apps and scores correct as of 11:46, 9 February 2014.

P. J. Molloy (born 30 April 1952) is an Irish former hurler who played as a left wing-forward at senior level for the Galway county team.

Born in Athenry, County Galway, Molloy first played competitive hurling in his youth. He made his first impression on the inter-county scene when he joined the Galway under-21 team. He made his senior debut during the 1971–72 National Hurling League. Molloy went on to play a key role for Galway for sixteen years, and won two All-Ireland medals and one National Hurling League medal. He was an All-Ireland runner-up on five occasions.

As a member of the Connacht inter-provincial team at various times throughout his career, Molloy won five Railway Cup medals. At club level he is a one-time Connacht medallist with Athenry. He also won two championship medals.

Molloy's career tally of 11 goals and 114 points was a record score for a Galway player which stood until it was surpassed by Eugene Cloonan.

Throughout his career Molloy made 35 championship appearances. His retirement came following the conclusion of the 1987 championship.

In retirement from playing, Molloy became involved in team management and coaching. At club level he coached Athenry to the All-Ireland title in 1997.

== Playing career ==
=== Club ===
In 1987 Athenry faced club kingpins Castlegar in the final of the county championship. The veteran Molloy was an inspiration throughout the championship campaign, and a 1–12 to 2–6 victory gave him a Galway Senior Hurling Championship medal. He later added a Connacht medal to his collection, as Pádraig Pearse's of Roscommon were downed by 4–18 to 0–7. The subsequent All-Ireland saw Athenry face Midleton. Two Kevin Hennessy goals and a kicked Colm O'Neill effort secured a 3–8 to 0–9 victory for Midleton and a defeat for Molloy's side.

After three defeats in championship deciders in the intervening years, Athenry finally triumphed again in 1994. A 2–6 to 0–9 defeat of Sarsfields gave Molloy, who came on as a late substitute, a second championship medal.

=== Inter-county ===
As a member of the Galway under-21 hurling team in 1972, Molloy tasted his first success at inter-county level. Galway reached the All-Ireland decider that year with Dublin providing the opposition. Although not included on the starting fifteen, Molloy was introduced as a substitute during the match. A narrow 2–9 to 1–10 victory gave him an All-Ireland Under-21 Hurling Championship medal.

By this stage Molloy had made his senior debut for Galway during the 1971–72 National League. He made his senior championship debut in a 3–19 to 4–10 All-Ireland quarter-final defeat of Kildare in 1974.

In 1975 Galway made a long-awaited breakthrough. A 4–9 to 4–6 defeat of Tipperary gave Molloy a National Hurling League medal. Galway later qualified for an All-Ireland final meeting with reigning champions Kilkenny, their first appearance in the championship decider in seventeen years and the very first seventy-minute final. Playing with the wind in the first half, Galway found themselves 0–9 to 1–3 down at the interval having played poorly. Early in the second half Kilkenny scored an early 1–3 to put this game to bed, and although Galway did reply with 1–1 and were only four points behind with twenty-five minutes left on the clock, there was never any doubt in this match. Galway were eventually defeated by 2–22 to 2–10.

Galway faced All-Ireland semi-final defeat over the next three years, however, Molloy was personally honoured in 1977 when he collected his first All-Star award.

Galway shocked four-in-a-row hopefuls Cork in the 1979 All-Ireland semi-final and qualified for an All-Ireland final showdown with Kilkenny. In one of the worst All-Ireland finals of the decade, Galway goalkeeper Séamus Shinnors had an absolute nightmare of a game. A 70-yards free by Liam "Chunky" O'Brien after just four minutes dipped, hit off Shinnors and ended up in the Galway net. Galway fought back and went two points up twelve minutes into the second half, however, they failed to score for the rest of the game. Four minutes before the end of the game another long-range free for Kilkenny ended up in the net behind Shinnors. It was a score which summed up the day for Molloy's side as Kilkenny went on to win by 2–12 to 1–8.

In 1980 Galway defeated Kildare and Offaly to reach a second consecutive All-Ireland final. Munster champions Limerick provided the opposition on this occasion and an exciting championship decider followed. Goals by Bernie Forde and Molloy meant that the men from the west led by 2–7 to 1–5 at half-time. Éamonn Cregan single-handedly launched the Limerick counter-attack in the second-half. Over the course of the game he scored 2–7, including an overhead goal and a point in which he showed the ball to Hayes and nonchalantly drove the ball over the bar. It was not enough to stem the tide and Galway went on to win the game by 2–15 to 3–9. It was Galway's first All-Ireland title since 1923, with Molloy picking up a winners' medal and the celebrations surpassed anything ever seen in Croke Park.

1981 saw Galway reach a third consecutive All-Ireland final and Offaly were the opponents. Everything seemed to be going well for Molloy's side as Galway hoped to capture a second consecutive All-Ireland title. Offaly 'keeper Damien Martin was doing great work in batting out an almost certain Galway goal early in the second-half. With twenty-three minutes left in the game Galway led by six points, however, they failed to score for the rest of the game. Johnny Flaherty hand-passed Offaly's second goal with just three minutes remaining. At the long whistle Galway were defeated by 2–12 to 0–15.

Galway reached the All-Ireland decider once again in 1985. Offaly provided the opposition once again and another tense game ensued. Once again it was Offaly's goal-scoring ability that proved crucial. Pat Cleary scored the first of the day after twenty-five minutes of play and got his second less than half a minute after the restart. Joe Dooley had a goal disallowed halfway through the second-half while a long Joe Cooney effort, which seemed to cross the goal line, was not given. P. J. Molloy was Galway's goal scorer, however, the day belonged to Offaly. A 2–11 to 1–12 score line resulted in defeat for Galway.

Galway reached a second successive All-Ireland decider again in 1986. The men from the west were the red-hot favourites against an ageing Cork team, however, on the day a different story unfolded. Four Cork goals, one from John Fenton, two from Tomás Mulcahy and one from Kevin Hennessy, stymied the Galway attack and helped "the Rebels" to a 4–13 to 2–15 victory.

In 1987 Molloy was in the twilight of his career as Galway qualified for a third All-Ireland final in-a-row. The prospect of becoming the first team to lose three consecutive championship deciders weighed heavily on the Galway team as Kilkenny provided the opposition. The game was not a classic by any standard and Noel Lane got a key goal for Galway nine minutes before the end. Molloy started the game on the bench but was introduced as a substitute. A 1–12 to 0–9 victory gave him a second All-Ireland medal. This victory brought the curtain down on his inter-county career.

=== Inter-provincial ===
Molloy also lined out with Connacht in the inter-provincial series of games and enjoyed much success.

In 1979 Molloy was at left wing-forward as Connacht reached the inter-provincial decider. A 1–13 to 1–9 defeat by Leinster was the result on that occasion. Molloy retained his position on the team in 1980 as Connacht faced Railway Cup specialists Munster in the decider. A low-scoring game followed, however, a 1–5 to 0–7 victory gave Connacht their first Railway Cup title since 1947. It was Molloy's first winners' medal in the inter-pro competition.

Connacht reached the Railway Cup final again in 1982. A 3–8 to 2–9 victory over Leinster gave Molloy his second Railway Cup medal. Defeat of the same opposition in 1983 allowed Connacht to retain the title for the first time in their history.

After defeat to Munster in 1985, both sides renewed their rivalry in the inter-provincial decider again in 1986. A comprehensive 3–11 to 0–11 victory gave Molloy a fourth Railway Cup medal.

In 1987 Connacht faced Leinster in the final once again. A narrow 2–14 to 1–14 victory to Connacht gave Molloy a fifth and final Railway Cup medal.

== Managerial career ==
P. J. Molloy
Sport
Club management
- Years: Club
- 1996–1998: Athenry
	1	1	1

=== Athenry ===
In 1996 Molloy was appointed manager of the Athenry senior hurling team. It proved to be a very successful debut year as he subsequently guided the team to a championship title following a 2–6 to 1–6 defeat of Carnmore. Athenry later took the Connacht title following a 1–15 to 1–8 defeat of Four Roads, before later reaching the All-Ireland decider against Wolfe Tones. Nine points from Eugene Cloonan helped Athenry to a 0–14 to 1–8 victory. It was the club's first All-Ireland title.

Athenry surrendered their titles in 1997, with Molloy stepping down as manager.

He has also been a camogie manager, including with his club, and see 2005 National Camogie League for county involvement.

== Honours ==
=== Team ===
Athenry

- Connacht Senior Club Hurling Championship (1): 1987
- Galway Senior Club Hurling Championship (1): 1987, 1994

Galway

- All-Ireland Senior Hurling Championship (2): 1980, 1987
- National Hurling League (1): 1974–75

Connacht

- Railway Cup (5): 1980, 1982, 1983, 1986, 1987

=== Individual ===
Awards

- All-Star Award (1): 1977

=== Team ===
Athenry

- All-Ireland Senior Club Hurling Championship (1): 1997
- Connacht Senior Club Hurling Championship (2): 1996, 1998
- Galway Senior Club Hurling Championship (2): 1996, 1998
