= Clara, County Kilkenny =

Parish in County Killkenny, Ireland

Clara Clárach
- Townland / Parish
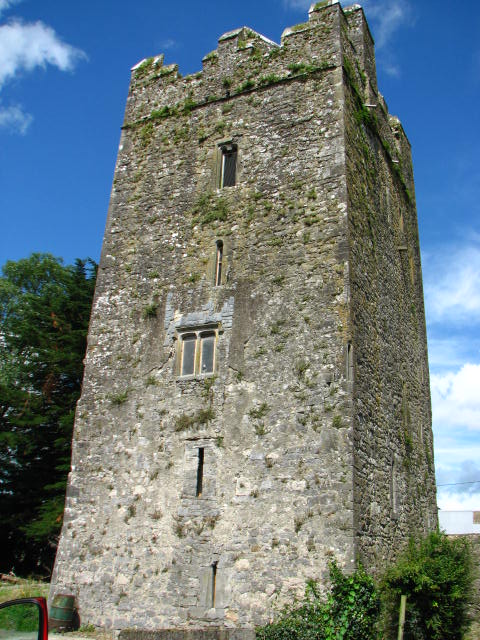
- Clara Castle

- Location in Ireland
- Coordinates: 52°38′41″N 7°09′09″W
- Country: Ireland
- Province: Leinster
- County: County Kilkenny
- Time zone: UTC+0
  - Summer (DST): UTC-1

Clara (Irish: Clárach, meaning 'plain/district') is a townland and parish in County Kilkenny, Ireland. It is a Catholic parish in the Diocese of Ossory, and also a civil parish.

== Catholic parish ==
The Catholic Parish of Clara in the Diocese of Ossory was created c. 1852 from the old Catholic parish of Gowran.

Clara church parish consists of the civil parishes of: Clara, Blackrath (upper), Blackrath (lower), St. Martin's and Tiscoffin.

== Civil parish ==
The civil parish has approximately 1,000 inhabitants, and is around 7 kilometres (4 mi) east of Kilkenny city.

Clara civil parish consists of the following townlands: Ballynamona - Baunmore - Churchclara - Clara Upper - Clarabricken - Clifden or Rathgarvan - Clohoge - Coneygar - Eagleshill - Kilmagar - Kingsland - Scart.

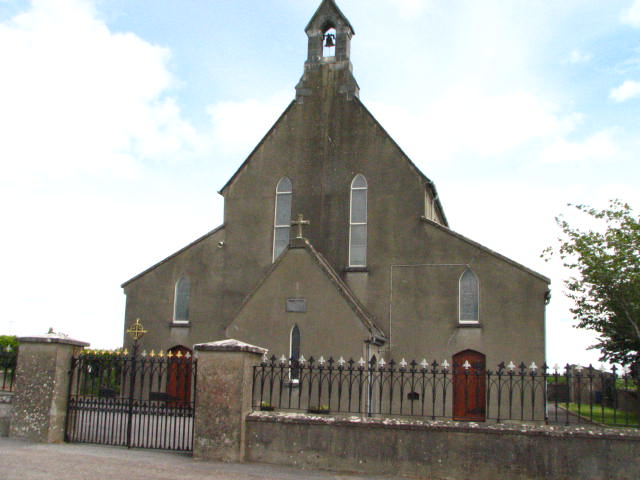
St. Colman's church-Clara

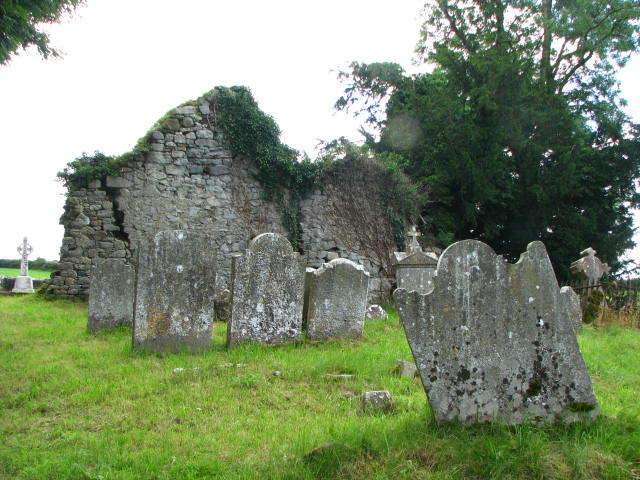
Old ChurchClara ruins

== Notable places and people ==
Saint Colman's church is situated at the centre of the parishes and Saint Colman is considered the patron saint of Clara. St.Colman's church is actually located just within Rathgarvan townland and not the neighbouring townland of Churchclara, wherein lie the remains of the old church of Clara. St. Colman is a common saint's name in Ireland. The Martyrology of Donegal lists ninety six saints of this name and the Book of Leinster records two hundred and nine. In addition there seems to be some confusion in ancient texts between Colman (Colmanus in Latin) and Columbanus.

Clara is also home to Clara Castle, a five-storey tower house built in the fifteenth century by the Shortall family.

== Sport ==
The civil parish is home to the Clara GAA club, which has produced several inter-county hurlers such as Jim Langton, Paddy Prendergast, Lester Ryan and Harry Ryan. One of the team's milestones in sport came in 1986, when they won their first Senior Hurling Championship. They also later won the 2013 Senior Hurling Championship.

== See also ==
- List of towns and villages in Ireland
