= List of Tipperary inter-county hurlers =

This is an incomplete list of hurlers who have played at senior level for the Tipperary county team. The players in this list included are from 1887 onwards. This list also includes a number of players from the first county selection in 1886, a year before the first All-Ireland Senior Championship. This list is an A–Z of Tipperary senior hurlers that have donned the blue and gold jersey of Tipperary and the All-Ireland SHC and Munster SHC medals that they have individually won. This list also includes players from the incomplete 1888 championship that was never finished due to the GAA's invasion of America.

== A ==
Name	Club	All-Ireland SHC Medals	Munster SHC Medals
John Addish	Moycarkey-Borris		
Con Ahearne	Clonoulty-Rossmore		
Martin Ahearne	Newport		
Tom Allen	Moycarkey-Borris	1900, 1906	1900, 1906
Patsy Armstrong	Boherlahan	1895	1895
Pat Arrigan	Carrick Davins	1960, 1965	1960, 1965, 1967
Martin Ayres	Nenagh Éire Óg		1922

== B ==
Name	Club	All-Ireland SHC Medals	Munster SHC Medals
Joe Banaghan	Kilruane MacDonagh's		
Francis Bannon	Holycross-Ballycahill	1949	1949
Jack Bannon	Thurles	1887	1887
Joe Bannon	Holycross-Ballycahill		
Séamus Bannon	Drom-Inch	1949, 1950, 1951	1949, 1950, 1951
Cathal Barret	Holycross-Ballycahill	2016, 2019	2015, 2016
Michael Barrett	Cahir		
Sean Power	Carrick Swan / Ballyneale	1951, 1958	1951, 1958
Aidan Barry	Lorrha-Dooha		
James Barry	Upperchurch-Drombane	2016, 2019	2015, 2016
Seamus Barry	Upperchurch-Drombane		
Tom Barry	Thurles Sarsfields		
Willie Barry	Cappawhite	1937	1937
Jack Bergin	Moycarkey-Borris		
Liam Bergin	Moycarkey-Borris		
Rody Berkery	Thurles Blues	1906	1906
Pat Bermingham	Thurles Sarsfields		
Colm Bonnar	Cashel King Cormacs	1989, 1991	1987, 1988, 1989, 1991, 1993
Conal Bonnar	Cashel King Cormacs	1989, 1991	1988, 1989, 1991, 1993
Cormac Bonnar	Cashel King Cormacs	1989, 1991	1988, 1989, 1991
Martin Bourke	Toomevara	1945	1945
Pa Bourke	Thurles Sarsfields	2010	2008, 2009
Paddy Bourke	J.K. Braken's		
Seamus Bourke	J.K. Bracken's		
Ned Bowe	Thurles	1887	1887
Paddy Bowe	Thurles Sarsfields		
Jody Brennan	Upperchurch-Drombane	2010	
Tony Brennan	Clonoulty-Rossmore	1945, 1949, 1950, 1951	1945, 1949, 1950, 1951
Ned Brennan	Tubberdora	1895, 1896, 1898	1895, 1896, 1898
Peter Brennan	Loughmore-Castleney		
Con Brewer	Toomevara		
Dan Brien	Boherlahan-Dualla	1916	1916, 1917
Eoin Brislane	Toomevara		
Paddy Brolan	Thurles Blues	1906, 1908	1906, 1908, 1909, 1913
Mick Brophy	Lorrha-Dooha		
William Brophy	Borrisokane		
Arthur Browne	Fr. Sheehy's		
Jim Browne	Thurles Sarsfields	1951	1951
Ned Browne	Clonoulty-Rossmore		
Paddy Browne	Boerlahan-Dualla		1922
Austin Buckley	Cappawhite	1989	1987, 1988, 1989
Eamonn Buckley	Drom-Inch		2008, 2009
Jimmy Burke	Moycarkey-Borris	1906, 1908	1906, 1908, 1909
Mick Burke	Cashel King Cormacs	1937	1937
Paddy Burke	Thurles Blues	1906, 1908	1906, 1908, 1909
Tom Burke	Thurles	1887	1887
Mick Burke	Cashel King Cormacs		
Mick Burns	Nenagh Éire Óg	1958, 1961, 1962, 1964, 1965	1958, 1960, 1961, 1962, 1964, 1965, 1967, 1968
Aidan Butler	Clonoulty-Rossmaore	2001	2001
Dick Butler	Thurles	1887	1887
Eamonn Butler	Drom-Inch	1971	1971
Martin Butler	Holycross-Ballycahill		
Pat Butler	Thurles Sarsfields	1965	1965
Paudie Butler	Drom-Inch		
Seamus Butler Jr	Drom-Inch		
Seamus Butler Sr	Drom-Inch	1971	1971
Tom Butler	Thurles Sarsfields	1930, 1937	1930, 1937
Tommy Butler	Drom-Inch		
Tommy Butler	Moyne-Templetuohy	1950	1950
Alan Byrne	Shannon Rovers		
Denis Byrne	Mullinahone		
John Byrne	Holycross-Ballycahill	1950, 1951	1950, 1951
Mickey 'The Rattler' Byrne	Thurles Sarsfields	1949, 1950, 1951, 1958	1949, 1950, 1951, 1958
Paul Byrne	Thurles Sarsfields	1971	1971
Phil Byrne	Tubberdora	1895, 1896, 1898, 1899	1895, 1896, 1898, 1899

== C ==
Name	Club	All-Ireland SHC Medals	Munster SHC Medals
Jack Caesar	Moycarkey-Borris	1989	1989
Joe Caeser	Killenaule		2008
Dinny Cahill	Kilruane McDonagh's		
Jack Cahill	Moycarkey-Borris	1899, 1906	1899, 1906
Jackie Cahill	Cashel King Cormacs		
Jim Cahill	Moycarkey-Borris		
John Cahill	Kilruane McDonagh's		
Liam Cahill	Ballingarry	2001	2001
Michael Cahill	Thurles Sarsfields	2010	2009
Phil Cahill	Holycross-Ballycahill	1925, 1930	1922, 1924, 1925, 1930
Tom Cahill	Gortnahoe-Glengoole		
Paul Callaghan	Carrick Davins		
Ralph Callaghan	Carrick Davins		
Andy Callanan	Thurles Blues		
JJ Callanan	Thurles Blues	1930	1930
Séamus Callanan	Drom-Inch	2010, 2016, 2019	2008, 2009, 2011, 2012, 2015, 2016
Anthony Carew	Thurles Blues	1908	1908, 1909
Donal Carey	Sean Treacy's		
Jim Carey	Drom-Inch	1971	1971
John Carey	Sean Treacy's		
Kieran Carey	Roscrea	1958, 1961, 1962, 1964, 1965	1958, 1960, 1961, 1962, 1964, 1965, 1967
Declan Carr	Holycross-Ballycahill	1989, 1991	1989, 1991, 1993
James Carr	Portroe		
Tim Carr	De Wet		
Brendan Carroll	Thurles Sarsfields		
Brian Carroll	St. Mary's, Clonmel		
John Carroll	Roscrea	2001	2001
Mick Carroll	Thurles	1887	1887
Mossy Carroll	St. Mary's, Clonmel		
Tom Carroll	Thurles	1887	1887
William Carroll	Éire Óg Annacarty	1949, 1950, 1951	1949, 1950, 1951
Dan Casey	Toomevara		
Ned Cawley	Toomevara		1913
Tom Cawley	Toomevara	1945	1945
Andy Cleary	Toomevara		
Jack Cleary	Toomevara		1922
Michael Cleary	Nenagh Éire Óg	1989, 1991	1988, 1989, 1991, 1993
Stephen Cleary	Carrick Davins	1958	1958
Michael Coen	Borris-Ileigh		
Flor Coffey	Boherlahan-Dualla	1945, 1949, 1950	1945, 1949, 1950
Jack Coffey	Newport	1937	1937
James Coffey	Newport		
Ger Coffey	Boherlahan-Dualla		
Jimmy 'Butler' Coffey	Newport	1937	1937
John Coffey	Boherlahan-Dualla	1945	1945
Joe Collins	Nenagh Éire Óg		
Jer Collison	Moneygall	1916	1916, 1917
Paddy Collison	Moneygall	1925	1925
Fonsie Condon	Lattin-Cullen		
Mickey Condon	Moycarkey-Borris	1899	1899
Niall Condon	Killenaule	1945	1941, 1945
Tim Condon	Moycarkey-Borris	1896, 1898, 1899, 1906	1896, 1898, 1899, 1906, 1907
Michael Conlon	Moycarkey-Borris	1898	1898
Jack Connolly	Tubberadora	1895, 1896, 1898	1895, 1896, 1898
Liam Connolly	Fethard	1958, 1961, 1962	1958, 1960, 1961, 1962
John Connors	Cashel King Cormacs	1971	1971
Pat Connors	Cashel King Cormacs	1971	1971
Tom Connors	Newport	1937	1937
Ian Conroy	Borrisokane		
Jack Conway	Toomevara		1922
Mick Conway	De Wet		
Chris Cooke	Killenaule		
Jimmy Cooney	Carrick Davins	1937	1937
Lar Corbett	Thurles Sarsfields	2001, 2010	2001, 2008, 2009, 2011, 2012, 2015
Danny Corcoran	Moycarkey-Borris	1899	1899
Eamonn Corcoran	J.K. Bracken's	2001	2001
John Cormac	Loughmore-Castleiney	1989	1989
Ger Cornally	Thurles Sarsfields	1937, 1945	1937, 1941, 1945
Jack Costelloe	Thurles Blues		
Paddy Costelloe	Moycarkey-Borris	1898	1898
Thomas Costelloe	Cappawhite	2001	2001
John Costigan	Clonakenny		1968
Matty Costigan	Moycarkey-Borris		
Justin Cottrell	Toomevara		
Hugh Craddock	Thurles Kickhams-Rahealtys-Fennellys	1937	1937
Michael Craddock	Thurles Sarsfields		
Jimmy Crampton	Roscrea		
Ned Croke	Boherlahan-Dualla	1916	1916
Mick Cronin	Lorrha-Dorrha	1930	1930
Anthony Crosse	Éire Óg Annacarty		1993
Phil Crowley	Borris-Ileigh	1950	1950
Tim Cullinane	Portroe		
Brendan Cummins	Ballybacon-Grange	2001, 2010	2001, 2008, 2009, 2011, 2012
James Cunningham	Roscrea		
Jimmy Cunningham	Roscrea		
Joe Cunningham Jnr	Roscrea		
Joe Cunningham Snr	Roscrea	1937	1937
Paul Curran	Mullinahone	2010	2008, 2009, 2011, 2012
Roderick Curran	Thurles Sarsfields	1937	1937

== D ==
Name	Club	All-Ireland SHC Medals	Munster SHC Medals
Jack D'Arcy	Nenagh Éire Óg	1925	1922, 1924, 1925
Jim D'Arcy	De Wet		
Martin D'Arcy	De Wet		
Mick D'Arcy	Nenagh Éire Óg	1925	1925
Eamonn Darmody	Moycarkey-Borris		
Dan Davern	Thurles	1887	1887
Conor Davitt	Cashel King Cormacs		1967
Patsy Dawson	Emly		
John Delahunty	Thurles Sarsfields		
Paul Delaney	Roscrea	1989, 1991	1987, 1988, 1989, 1991, 1993
Phil Delaney	Borris-Illeigh	1958	1958
Timmy Delaney	Borris-Illeigh		
Michael Dempsey	Moycarkey-Borris		
John Devane	Clonoulty-Rossmore		2008, 2009
Will Devane	Tubberadora	1895, 1896, 1898	1895, 1896, 1898
Francis Devaney	Toomevara		
Frank Devaney	De Wet		
Jim Devaney	Borris-Illeigh	1937	1937
Liam Devaney	Borris-Illeigh	1958, 1961, 1962, 1964, 1965	1958, 1960, 1961, 1962, 1964, 1965, 1967, 1968
Jim Devitt	Cashel King Cormacs	1945, 1949, 1950	1945, 1949, 1950
John Dillon	Roscrea	1965	1965
Bob Doherty	Thurles Blues		
Eugene Doherty	J.K. Bracken's		
Jack Doherty	Boherlahan-Dualla	1906, 1908, 1916	1906, 1908, 1909, 1913, 1916, 1917
Larry Doherty	Drom-Inch		
Paddy Doherty	Boherlahan-Dualla	1898	1898
Jack Donovan	Toomevara	1930	1930
Leo Dooley	Roscrea	1958	1958
Paul Dooley	Borrisokane		
Denis Doorley	Borrisokane		1941
Michael Doran	Thurles Sarsfields		
Tom Doran	Moycarkey-Borris		
Dan Doyle	Thurles Sarsfields		
Gerry Doyle	Holycross-Ballycahill		
Gerry Doyle	Thurles Sarsfields	1937, 1945	1937, 1945
Jimmy Doyle	Thurles Sarsfields	1958, 1961, 1962, 1964, 1965, 1971	1958, 1960, 1961, 1962, 1964, 1965, 1967, 1968, 1971
John Doyle	Holycross-Ballycahill	1949, 1950, 1951, 1958, 1961, 1962, 1964, 1965	1949, 1950, 1951, 1958, 1960, 1961, 1962, 1964, 1965, 1967
John Doyle Jnr	Holycross-Ballycahill		
Michael Doyle	Holycross-Ballycahill		1987
Mickey Doyle	Thurles Sarsfields	1945	1945
Paddy Doyle	Thurles Sarsfields	1965	1965
Tommy Doyle	Thurles Sarsfields	1937, 1945, 1949, 1950, 1951	1947, 1941, 1945, 1949, 1950, 1951
Jimmy Doyle Jnr	Thurles Sarsfields		
Tom Duffy	Lorrha-Dorrha	1925	1924, 1925
James Duggan	Carrick Swan		
Jimmy Duggan	Thurles Sarsfields		
Joe Duggan	Gortnahoe-Glengoole		
Jack Dunlea	Silvermines		
Benny Dunne	Toomevara	2010	2008, 2009
Jack Dunne	Moycarkey-Borris		
Jack Dunne	Thurles	1887	1887
Ken Dunne	Toomevara		
Phil Dunne	Boherlahan		
Sean Dunne	Cashel King Cormacs	1949	1949
Tom Dunne	Moycarkey-Borris		
Tom Dunne	Boherlahan-Dualla		
Tommy Dunne	Toomevara	2001	1993, 2001
Tony Dunne	Toomevara		
Watty Dunne	Boherlahan-Dualla	1898, 1899, 1900	1898, 1899, 1900
Bill Dwan	Toomevara		1913
Jack Dwan	De Wet		
Roger Dwan	Kilruane McDonaghs		
Tom Dwan	Thurles Blues	1916	1916, 1922
William Dwan	Thurles Blues		1922
Con Dwyer	Boherlahan-Dualla		
Jack Dwyer	Thurles Sarsfields	1945	
Jer Dwyer	Thurles	1887	1887
Ned Dwyer	Moycarkey-Borris		
Paddy Dwyer	Holycross-Ballycahill	1949	1949
Paddy Dwyer	Holycross-Ballycahill	1925	1917, 1922, 1924, 1925
Phil Dwyer	Boherlahan-Dualla		1941
Tim Dwyer	Thurles	1887	1887
Tom Dwyer	Tubberadora	1895	1895
Will Dwyer	Tubberadora		
Willie Dwyer	Boherlahan-Dualla		1917

== E ==
Name	Club	All-Ireland SHC Medals	Munster SHC Medals
Darragh Egan	Kildangan	2010	2008, 2009
Tom Egan	Moyne-Tempetuohy	1971	1971
James English	Clonoulty-Rossmore		
Nicky English	Latin-Cullen	1989, 1991	1987, 1988, 1989, 1991, 1993
Sean English	Nenagh Éire Óg		
Theo English	Marlfield	1958, 1961, 1962, 1964, 1965	1958, 1960, 1961, 1962, 1964, 1965, 1967
Eddie Enright	Thurles Sarsfields	2001	2001
Johnny Enright	Thurles Sarsfields		
Martin Esmonde	Moyne-Tempetuohy		
Edward Everard	Moyne-Tempetuohy		
Johnny Everard	Moyne-Tempetuohy	1950	1950
Ned Everard	Moyne-Tempetuohy	1945	1945

== F ==
Name	Club	All-Ireland SHC Medals	Munster SHC Medals
Donnache Fahey	St Mary's Clonmel	2001	2001
Martin Fahey	Drom-Inch		
Paddy Fahey	Carrick Swans	1949, 1950, 1951	1949, 1950, 1951
Billy Fanning	Moneygall		
Declan Fanning	Killenaule	2010	2008, 2009
Paddy Fanning	Moneygall		
Pat Fanning	Borris-Ileigh	1971	1971
Phil Fanning	Moneygall		
Philip Fanning	Moneygall		
John Farrell	Knockavilla-Donaghskeigh Kickhams		
Matt Feehan	Holycross-Ballycahill		
Jimmy Finn	Borris-Ileigh	1950, 1951, 1958	1950, 1951, 1958, 1960
Pa Fitzelle	Cashel King Cormacs		1987
Aidan Fitzgerald	Fethard		
Diarmaid Fitzgerald	Roscrea		2008, 2009
Dick Fitzgerald	Gortnahoe-Glengoole		
John Fitzgerald	Gortnahoe-Glengoole	1908	1908, 1909
Pat Fitzgerald	Gortnahoe-Glengoole	1908	1908, 1909
Tommy Fitzgerald	Roscrea		
Michael Fitzgibbon	Silvermines		
Joe Fitzpatrick	Moycarkey-Borris	1916	1916, 1917, 1922, 1924
Sean Fitzpatrick	Carrick Swans		
Tony Fitzpatrick	Carrick Swans		
Aidan Flanagan	Boherlahan-Dualla		
Ger Flanagan	Boherlahan-Dualla		
Jack 'Thady' Flanagan	Tubberadora	1895, 1896, 1899	1895, 1896, 1899
James Flanagan	Templederry Kenyons		
Jim Flanagan	Tubberadora	1895, 1896	1895, 1896
John Flanagan	Moycarkey-Borris	1971	1967, 1968, 1971
Martin Flanagan	Boherlahan-Dualla		
Ned Flanagan	Thurles	1887	1887
Paddy Flanagan	Moycarkey-Borris		
Peadar Flanagan	Templederry Kenyons		1941
Tim Flanagan	Tubberadora	1898	1898
Brian Flannery	Kildangan		
Nicky Flanagan	Kildangan		
Richie Flannery	Nenagh Éire Óg		
Seamus Flannery	Kildangan	1949	1949
William Flannery	Nenagh Éire Óg	1971	1971
Paddy Fleming	Carrick Swans		
Tom Fleming	Carrick Swans	1950	1950
Joe Fletcher	Roscrea		
Tom Flynn	Newcastle		
Jerry Fogarty	Thurles Blues		
Jim Fogarty	Moyne-Tempetuohy	1971	1971
John Fogarty	Tubberadora		
Tom Fogarty	Moyne-Tempetuohy		
Christy Forde	Lorrha-Doorha		
Johnny Forde	Silvermines		
Kevin Fox	Éire óg Annacarty		
Pat Fox	Éire óg Annacarty	1989, 1991	1987, 1988, 1989, 1991, 1993
George Frend	Toomevara		1993
Paddy Furlong	Knockavilla-Donaghskeigh Kickhams	1949	1949
Pat Furlong	Cappawhite		

== G ==
Name	Club	All-Ireland SHC Medals	Munster SHC Medals
Brian Gaynor	Kilruane MacDonagh's		
Len Gaynor	Kilruane MacDonagh's	1964, 1965, 1971	1964, 1965, 1967, 1968, 1971
Jimmy Gibson	Kilruane MacDonagh's		1960
Seamus Gibson	Kilruane MacDonagh's		1987, 1988
Jack Gilmartin	Toomevara		
Ned Gilmartin	Toomevara		1913
Billy Gleeson	Moycarkey-Borris	1899, 1900	1899, 1900
Con Gleeson	Moycarkey-Borris	1899	1899
Conor Gleeson	Boherlahan-Dualla	2001	2001
Dan Gleeson	Moycarkey-Borris	1899	1899
Dan Gleeson	Silvermines		
Darren Gleeson	Portroe	2010, 2016	2008, 2009, 2011, 2012, 2015, 2016
Edward Gleeson	Thurles Sarsfields	1945	1945
Jack Gleeson	Borrisokane		
Jack Gleeson	Moycarkey-Borris	1899, 1900, 1906, 1916	1899, 1900, 1906, 1916, 1917
Jim Gleeson	Uppercharch-Drombane	1895	1895
John Gleeson	Moneygall	1971	1968, 1971
John Gleeson	Roscrea	1937	1937
Martin Gleeson	Silvermines		
Michael Gleeson	Thurles Sarsfields		
Mickey Gleeson	Thurles Blues	1906	1906
Pat Gleeson	Kildangan		
Sean Gleeson	Toomevara		
Tim Gleeson	Moneygall	1951	1951
Tim Gleeson	Clonoulty-Rossmore	1906, 1908	1906, 1908, 1909, 1913
Harry Gooldsboro	Thurles Sarsields	1945	1945
Bill Gorman	Holycross-Ballycahill		
Paddy Gorman	Thurles Sarsields		
Joe Gould	Clonoulty-Rossmore		
Jody Grace	Toomevara	1991	1991, 1993
John Grace	Silvermines		
Mike Grace	Burgess		
Dick Grant	Moycarkey-Borris		
Ned Grant	Moycarkey-Borris	1899	1899
Pat Griffin	Carrick Davins		
John Grogan	Cashel King Cormacs		
Jim Guilfoyle	Moneygall		
Pat Guinnane	Burgess		

== H ==
Name	Club	All-Ireland SHC Medals	Munster SHC Medals
John Hackett	Moycarkey-Borris	1900	1900, 1909
John Hackett	Borris-Illeigh	1937	1937
Liam Hackett	Toomevara		
Ned Hackett	Moycarkey-Borris	1900	1900
Stephen Hackett	Toomevara	1925	1913, 1917, 1922, 1924, 1925
Timmy Hammersley	Clonoulty-Rossmore	2010	
Jim Hanly	Éire óg Annacarty		
Michael Hanly	Silvermines	1971	1971
Joe Hannigan	Shannon Rovers		
Jackie Hannon	Roscrea	1971	1968, 1971
James Hannon	Roscrea		
Tony Hannon	Roscrea	1937	1937
James Harney	Thurles Blues	1930	1930
Bill Harris	Moycarkey-Borris		1913
Christy Hartigan	Newport	1962	1962
Jack Harty	Toomevara		1913
Phil Harty	Borris-Illeigh		
Tom Harty	Borris-Illeigh		
Willie Harty	Toomevara	1951	1951
Matt Hassett	Toomevara	1961, 1962	1960, 1961, 1962
Dominic Hayes	Knockavilla-Donaghskeigh Kickhams		
George Hayes	Ballingarry		
Jer Hayes	Thurles Blues	1906	1906
JJ Hayes	Moycarkey-Borris		
Joe Hayes	Clonoulty-Rossmore	1989, 1991	1987, 1988, 1989, 1991, 1993
John Joe Hayes	Moycarkey-Borris	1925	1917, 1922, 1924, 1925
Ned Hayes	Moycarkey-Borris	1899, 1900	1899, 1900
Paddy Hayes	Moycarkey-Borris	1900	1900
Peter Hayes	Clonoulty-Rossmore		1987
Tommy Hayes	Moycarkey-Borris	1937, 1945	1937, 1941, 1945
Willie Hayes	Knockavilla-Donaghskeigh Kickhams		
Tom Hayes (B)	Moycarkey-Borris		
Tom Hayes (L)	Moycarkey-Borris		
Tom Healy	Thurles	1887	1887
Fergal Healy	Knockavilla-Donaghskeigh Kickhams		
James Heaney	Moycarkey-Borris	1930	1930
James Heaney	Boherlahan-Dualla		
Tim Heaney	Boherlahan-Dualla		
James Heeney	Thurles Kickhams-Rahealty-Fennelly's		1941
Brian Heffernan	Nenagh Éire Óg		
John Heffernan	Nenagh Éire Óg	1989	1987, 1988, 1989
John Heffernan	Moycarkey-Borris	1899	1899
Michael Heffernan	Kilruane McDonaghs		
Mikey Heffernan	Nenagh Éire Óg	2010	
Paddy Hennessy	Kilsheelan-Kilcash	1958	1958
Phil Hennessy	Nenagh Éire Óg	1958, 1961	1958, 1961
Philip Hennessy	Nenagh Éire Óg		
Séamus Hennessy	Kilruane MacDonagh's	2010	2009
Séamus Hennessy	Kilruane MacDonagh's		
Batt Hickey	Cashel King Cormacs		
Darragh Hickey	Boherlahan-Dualla		
John Hickey	Cashel King Cormacs		
Lar Hickey	Killenauale		
Pat Hickey	Killenaule	1945	1945
Tom Hickey	Tubberadora	1896	1896
William Hickey	Bherlahan-Dualla		
Billy Hogan	Lorrha-Doorha	1949, 1951	
Eddie Hogan	Roscrea		
Enda Hogan	Kilruane MacDonagh's		
Ken Hogan	Lorrha-Doorha	1989, 1991	1987, 1988, 1989, 1991, 1993
Liam Hogan	Burgess		
Pádraig Hogan	Borrisokane	1991	1991
Séamus Hogan	Kildangan	1971	1967, 1968, 1971
Jack Horan	Tubberadora	1895, 1899	1895, 1899
Paddy Horan	Moycarkey-Borris		
Brian Horgan	Knockavilla-Donaghskeigh Kickhams		
Fergal Horgan	Knockavilla-Donaghskeigh Kickhams		
John Hough	Toomevara	1951, 1958, 1961	1951, 1958, 1961
Kieran Hough	Lorrha-Doorha		
Garrett Howard	Toomevara		
Jim Hurley	Thurles Sarsfields		
Mick Hynes	Nenagh Éire Óg	1958, 1961, 1962	1958, 1961, 1962

== I ==
Name	Club	All-Ireland SHC Medals	Munster SHC Medals
Michael Ivors	Balingarry	1971	1971

== J ==
Name	Club	All-Ireland SHC Medals	Munster SHC Medals
Michael Jones	Newport	1971	1971
Tom Joy	Éire óg Annacarty		

== K ==
Name	Club	All-Ireland SHC Medals	Munster SHC Medals
Donal Kealy	Roscrea	1991	1991
Con Keane	Thurles Blues		
Connie Keane	Thurles Sarsfields	1951	1951
Larry Keane	Thurles Sarsfields	1958	1958
Michael Keane	Thurles Sarsfields		
Noel Keane	Clonoulty-Rossmore		
Ned Kearney	Tubberadora	1895	1895
Mick Kearns	Nenagh Éire Óg	1964, 1965	1964, 1965
John Keating	Ballybacon-Grange	1958	1958
Babs Keating	Ballybacon-Grange	1964, 1965, 1971	1964, 1965, 1967, 1968, 1971
Jim Kehoe	Kilsheelin-Kilcash		
Denis Kelly	Borrisokane	1937	1937
Dinny Kelly	De Wet		
Eoin Kelly	Mullinahone	2001, 2010	2001, 2008, 2009, 2011, 2012
John Kelly	Cappawhite	1971	1968, 1971
Matty Kelly	Tubberadora	1895, 1896	1895, 1896
Paul Kelly	Mullinahone / O'Loughlin Gaels	2001	2001, 2008, 2009
Tommy Kelly	Moycarkey-Borris		
William Kelly	Toomevara		1913
Tom Kenna	Thurles Blues	1906, 1908	1906, 1908
David Kennedy	Loughmore-Castleiney	2001	2001
Donal Kennedy	Moneygall		
Gerry Kennedy	Killeanaule		2008, 2009
Jack Kennedy	Toomevara	1925	1913, 1922
James Kennedy	Thurles Blues	1906	1906
Jimmy Kennedy	Kildangan	1949, 1950, 1951	1949, 1950, 1951
Joe Kennedy	Lorrha-Doorha		
John Kennedy	Clonoulty-Rossmore	1989, 1991	1987, 1988, 1989, 1991
Johnny Kennedy	Kilruane MacDonagh's		
Kevin Kennedy	Toomevara		
Martin Kennedy	Toomevara	1925, 1930	1922, 1924, 1925, 1930
Michael 'Bonny' Kennedy	Clonoulty-Rossmore		
Michael Kennedy	Knockshegowna	1937	1937
Pádraig Kennedy	Nenagh Éire Óg	1961	1961
Pat Kennedy	Killenauale		
Pat Kennedy	Moneygall	1925	1925
Philip Kennedy	Nenagh Éire Óg		
Tom Kennedy Jnr	Moycarkey-Borris	1937	1937
Tom Kennedy Snr	Moycarkey-Borris	1900	1900
William Kennedy	Moycarkey-Borris		
Brendan Kenny	Borris-Illeigh		
Brian Kenny	Borris-Illeigh		1968
Mick Kenny	St Mary's Clonmel		
Paddy Kenny	Borris-Illeigh	1949, 1950, 1951	1949, 1950, 1951
Philip Kenny	Borris-Illeigh	1987	
Phil Kenny	Borris-Illeigh	1949, 1950, 1951	1949, 1950, 1951
Seán Kenny	Borris-Illeigh	1949, 1950, 1951	1949, 1950, 1951
Stephen Kenny	Kilruane MacDonagh's	1925	1924, 1925
Gerry Keogh	Ballina		
Jim Keogh	Silvermines		
Mackey Keogh	Kilruane MacDonagh's		
Pat Kerwick	Killenaule	2010	2008, 2009
Tom Kerwick	Thurles Blues	1906, 1908	1906, 1908, 1909
Will Kerwick	Tubberadora	1895	1895
Tom Kevin	Boherlahan-Dualla	1951	1951
Larry Kiely	Gortnahoe-Glengoole	1964, 1965	1964, 1965, 1967
James Killeen	Kildangan		
Liam King	Lorrha-Doorha	1971	1971
Pat King	Toomevara		
Tom King	Loughmore-Castleiney		
George Kinnane	Borris-Illeigh		
Mick Kinnane	Clonoulty-Rossmore	1950	1950

== L ==
Name	Club	All-Ireland SHC Medals	Munster SHC Medals
Jim Lacey	Boherlahan-Dualla		
Ned Lambe	Thurles	1887	1887
Noel Lane	Lorrha-Dorrha	1964, 1971	1964, 1971
Jim Lanigan	Thurles Sarsfields	1930, 1937	1930, 1937
John Lanigan	Thurles Sarsfields	1937	1937
Thomas Lanigan	Thurles Sarsfields		
Tony Lanigan	Holycross-Ballycahill	1991	1991
Joe Larkin	Moyne-Templetuohy	1950	1950
Tom Larkin	Kilsheelin-Kilcash	1958, 1965	1958, 1965
Jack Leahy	Moycarkey-Borris		
John Leahy	Mullinahone	1989, 1991	1988, 1989, 1991, 1993
Johnny Leahy	Boherlahan-Dualla	1916, 1925	1913, 1916, 1917, 1922, 1924, 1925
Mick Leahy	Boherlahan-Dualla	1916	1916, 1917
Paddy Leahy	Boherlahan-Dualla	1916, 1925	1916, 1917, 1924, 1925
Pat Leahy	Thurles	1887	1887
Phil Leahy	Moycarkey-Borris		
Rory Leahy	Nenagh Éire Óg	1945	1945
Tom Leahy	Boherlahan-Dualla	1930, 1937	1930, 1937
John Leamy	Golden-Kilfeacle		1987, 1988
John Leamy	Thurles	1887	1887
Mick Lee	Nenagh Éire Óg	1937	1937
Stephen Lillis	Thurles Sarsfields		
Mick Lonergan	Moycarkey-Borris	1962, 1964	1962, 1964, 1967
Ned Long	Upperchurch-Drombane		
Jer Looby	Boherlahan-Dualla		1941
Pat Looby	Drom-Inch		
Francis Loughnane	Roscrea	1971	1968, 1971
Martin Loughnane	Roscrea		
Phil Lowry	Upperchurch-Drombane	1971	1967, 1968, 1971
Mick Luby	Toomevara		

== M ==
Name	Club	All-Ireland SHC Medals	Munster SHC Medals
Dan Mackey	Thurles Sarsfields	1937	1937
Seamus Mackey	Holycross-Ballycahill	1965	1965
John Madden	Lorrha-Dorrha	1989, 1991	1989, 1991
Paddy Madden	Carrick Swans		
Ger Maguire	Lattin-Cullen		
John Maguire	Thurles Sarsfields	1945	1945
Pat Maguire	Lattin-Cullen		
Andy 'Mason' Maher	Thurles	1887	1887
Billy Maher	Moycarkey-Borris	1900	1900
Brendan Maher	Borris-Illeigh	2010, 2016, 2019	2009, 2011, 2012, 2015, 2016
Brendan Maher	Roscrea		
Con Maher	Thurles Kickhams-Rahealtys-Fennellys		
Con Maher	Boherlahan-Dualla		
Dan Maher	Boherlahan-Dualla		
Denis 'Long Dinny' Maher	Thurles	1887	1887
Denis 'Long Dinny' Maher	Thurles	1887	1887
Dick Maher	Moycarkey-Borris		
Donagh Maher	Burgess GAA	2016, 2019	2012, 2016
Donnacha Maher	Thurles Sarsfields	1951	1951
Francie Maher	Holycross-Ballycahill	1949	1949
Jack Maher	Tubberadora	1895, 1896, 1898, 1899, 1900	1895, 1896, 1898, 1899, 1900
Jack 'Black Jack' Maher	Thurles	1887	1887
Jackie Maher	Cashel King Cormacs		
James Maher	Boherlahan-Dualla	1950	1950
Jimmy Maher	Thurles Sarsfields	1949	1949
Jimmy Maher	Boherlahan-Dualla	1945	1941, 1945
John Maher	Thurles Sarsfields	1930, 1937, 1945	1930, 1937, 1941, 1945
John Maher	Boherlahan-Dualla	1895, 1898	1895, 1898
John C. Maher	Thurles Blues		
John Joe Maher	Roscrea		
Liam Maher	Boherlahan-Dualla		
Martin Maher	Borris-Illeigh		
Martin Maher	Thurles Sarsfields	1958	1958
Martin Maher	Thurles Sarsfields	1937	1937
Matty Maher (1)	Thurles	1887	1887
Matty Maher (2)	Thurles	1887	1887
Michael Maher	Thurles Sarsfields		
Michael Maher	Silvermines		
Michael Maher	Boherlahan-Dualla	1945	1945
Michael 'Little' Maher	Thurles Sarsfields	1937	1937
Michéal Maher	Thurles Sarsfields	1945	1945
Michael Maher	Holycross-Ballycahill	1958, 1961, 1962, 1964, 1965	1958, 1960, 1961, 1982, 1964, 1965
Mick Maher	Thurles Sarsfields	1930	1930
Mikey Maher	Tubberadora	1895, 1896, 1898, 1899, 1900	1895, 1896, 1898, 1899, 1900
Ned Maher	Tubberadora	1895, 1896, 1898, 1899, 1900	1895, 1896, 1898, 1899, 1900
Ned Maher	Thurles	1887	1887
Paddy Maher	Thurles Sarsfields	1945	1945
Pádraic Maher	Thurles Sarsfields	2010, 2016, 2019	2009, 2011, 2012, 2015, 2016
Pat Maher	Thurles Sarsfields		
Patrick Maher	Lorrha-Doorha	2010, 2016, 2019	2009, 2011, 2012, 2015, 2016
Peter Maher	Clonoulty-Rossmore	1895	1895
Phil Ma19her	Borris-Illeigh		
Philip Maher	Borris-Illeigh	2001	2001
Philip Maher	Holycross-Ballycahill		
Seán Maher	Burgess		
Ronan Maher	Thurles sarsfields	2016, 2019	2015, 2016
Shane Maher	Burgess	2010	2008, 2009
Sonny Maher	Borris-Illeigh	1949, 1950, 1951	1949, 1950, 1951
Tim Maher	Moycarkey-Borris		
Tom Maher	Thurles	1887	1887
Paddy Maher 'Best'	Moycarkey-Borris	1900, 1906	1900, 1906
Pat Mahoney	Carrick Swans		
Pat Malone	Rockwell Rovers		
Hugh Maloney	Nenagh Éire Óg	2010	2008, 2009
Noel Maloney	Nenagh Éire Óg		
Brian Mannion	Lorrha-Doorha		
Tom Mason	Thurles Sarsfields	1945	1945
Gerry McCarthy	Kilruane MacDonagh's	1958	1958, 1960
Michael McCarthy	Knockavilla-Donaghskeigh Kickhams		
Shane McDermott	Cappawhite		
Brian McDonnell	Kildangan		1967
Jim McDonnell	Burgess	1958	1958
Michael McElgunn	Thurles Sarsfields	1958, 1962	1958, 1962
Brendan McGrath	Nenagh Éire Óg		
EJ McGrath	Nenagh Éire Óg		
Frank McGrath	Nenagh		1913
Jack McGrath	Toomevara		1913
Jack McGrath	Tubberadora	1895, 1896	1895, 1896
John McGrath	Borris-Illeigh		1987
Johnny McGrath	Nenagh Éire Óg	1958, 1961	1958, 1961
Liam McGrath	Burgess		
Liam McGrath	Toomevara		
Martin McGrath	Knockavilla-Donaghskeigh Kickhams		1987
Noel McGrath	Loughmore-Castleliney	2010, 2016, 2019	2009, 2011, 2012, 2016
Pat McGrath	Loughmore-Castleliney	1989	1989
Shane McGrath	Ballinahinch	2010	2008, 2009, 2011, 2012, 2015
John McIntyre	Lorrha-Dorrha		
Jack McKenna	Ballingarry	1930	1930
Joe McKenna	Toomevara		1913
John 'Mackey' McKenna	Borrisokane	1961, 1962, 1964, 1965, 1971	1961, 1962, 1964, 1965, 1967, 1968, 1971
Paul McKenna	Ballingarry	1930	1930
Anthony Moloughlin	Portroe		
Denis McLoughlin	Portroe		
Pat McLoughlin	Portroe		
Seán McLoughlin	Thurles Sarsfields	1958, 1961, 1962, 1964, 1965	1958, 1960, 1961, 1962, 1964, 1965, 1967, 1968
Jim McLoughney	Shannon Rovers		
Joe McLoughney	Thurles Blues	1906, 1908	1906, 1908, 1909
Pat McLoughney	Shannon Rovers		
Martin McNamara	Thurles	1887	1887
Wedger Meagher	Toomevara	1913, 1919	
Jack Meara	De Wet		
Mick Minogue	Roscrea	1958, 1961	1958, 1961
Rody Minogue	Nenagh Éire Óg		1919
Bob Mockler	Moycarkey-Borris		1909, 1913
Bobby Mockler	Thurles Sarsfields	1958	1958
Jack Mockler	Thurles Blues	1906, 1908	1906, 1908, 1909
Johnny Mockler	Thurles	1887	1887
Martin Mockler	Moycarkey-Borris	1925	1919, 1922, 1924, 1925
Nicholas Mockler	Thurles Sarsfields	1949	1949
Tom Mockler	Thurles Blues		
Pat Molloy	Moycarkey-Borris		
Andy Moloney	Cahir		
Danny Moloney	Kildangan		
Neil Moloney	De Wet		
Phil Moloney	Thurles Blues	1906	1906
Simon Moloney	Boherlahan-Dualla		
Stephen Moloney	Solohead		1924
Terry Moloney	Aravale Rovers	1958, 1961	1958, 1960, 1961
Tom Moloney	Boherlahan-Dualla		
Billy Moloughey	Kildangan	1961	1960, 1961
Charlie Moloughney	Kilruane MacDonagh's	1965	1965
Eddie Moloughney	Kildangan		
Mick Moloughney	De Wet		
Tom Moloughney	Kilruane MacDonagh's	1961, 1962	1960, 1961, 1962
Jack Mooney	Thurles Blues	1906, 1908	1906, 1908, 1909
James Moran	Ballybacon-Grange	1971	1971
Liam Moran	Lorrha-Doorha		
Fergus Moriarty	Tubberadora	1895, 1896	1895, 1896
Noel Morris	Loughmore-Castleiney	2001	2001
Colin Morrissey	Galtee Rovers		
Dan Morrissey	Knockavilla-Donaghskeigh Kickhams		
Pa Morrissey	Galtee Rovers		
Paddy Morrissey	Kildangan		
Pat Morrissey	Boherlahan-Dualla		
Roger Mounsey	Toomevara	1958, 1961, 1962	1958, 1960, 1961, 1962
Jack Moylan	Boherlahan-Dualla		
Willie Moynihan	Cashel King Cormacs		
Danny Mullins	Moycarkey-Borris	1899	1899
Vincent Mullins	St Mary's Clonmel		
Denis 'Bunny' Murphy		1937	1937
Francis Murphy	Thurles Sarsfields		
Jack Murphy	Cashel King Cormacs	1945	1945
Jimmy Murphy	Moycarkey-Borris	1916	1910, 1913, 1914, 1915, 1916
Johnny Murphy	Cashel King Cormacs	1958	1958
Michael Murphy	Teplederry kenyons		
Michael Murphy	Thurles Sarsfields	1945	1945
Mick Murphy	Thurles Sarsfields	1958, 1962, 1964	1958, 1962, 1964
Ned Murphy	Thurles	1887	1887
Noel Murphy	Thurles Sarsfields	1958	1958, 1960
Tadhg Murphy	Roscrea	1971	1971
Denis Murphy	Thurles Sarsfields		
Philip Murray	Nenagh Éire Óg	1961	1961

== N ==
Name	Club	All-Ireland SHC Medals	Munster SHC Medals
Joe Nagle	Boherlahan-Dualla	1916	1916, 1917, 1922
Donie Nealon	Burgess	1958, 1961, 1962, 1964, 1965	1958, 1960, 1961, 1962, 1964, 1965, 1967, 1968
Rody Nealon	Burgess	1925	1925
Sean Nealon	Burgess	1991	1991
Donie Nolan	Solohead	1958	1958
Jack Nolan	Nenagh Éire Óg		
Jim Nolan	Tubberadora	1895	1895
Michael Nolan	Toomevara		
Mickey Nolan	Roscrea	1961, 1971	1961, 1971
Rody Nolan	Nenagh Éire Óg		
Jimmy Noonan	Knockshegowna		
Willie Nugent	Carrick Swans	1949, 1951	1949, 1951

== O ==
Name	Club	All-Ireland SHC Medals	Munster SHC Medals
Sgt. Niall O'Boyle	Templemore		
Bill O'Brien	Moycarkey-Borris		
Billy O'Brien	Nenagh Éire Óg		
Conor O'Brien	Éire Óg Annacarty	2010	2008, 2009
Donie O'Brien	Knockavilla-Donaghskeigh Kickhams	1961, 1962	1960, 1961, 1962
Edward O'Brien	Thurles Sarsfields		
Gerry O'Brien	Portroe		
Hawk O'Brien	Thurles Blues	1906, 1908	1906, 1908, 1909
James O'Brien	Moycarkey-Borris	1899	1899
John O'Brien	Toomevara	2001, 2010	2001, 2008, 2009
John O'Brien	Moycarkey-Borris	1899	1899
Kevin O'Brien	Kilruane McDonaghs		
Martin O'Brien	Thurles Blues	1906, 1908	1906, 1908, 1909
Paddy O'Brien	Toomevara	2001	2001
Paddy O'Brien	Cashel King Cormacs	1949	1949
PJ O'Brien	Thurles Sarsfields		
Sean O’Brien	Newport	2019	
William O'Brien	Nenagh Éire Óg	1950	1950
Pat O'Callaghan	Carrick Davins		
Donie O'Connell	Killeanaule	1989, 1991	1987, 1988, 1989, 1991
John O'Connor	Cashel King Cormacs		
Patsy O'Connor	Cashel King Cormacs		
Kevin O'Connor	Roscrea		
Tadhg O'Connor	Roscrea	1971	1968, 1971
Arthur O'Donnell	Boherlahan-Dualla	1916, 1925	1916, 1917, 1922, 1924, 1925
Eddie O'Donnell	Nenagh Éire Óg		
Gus O'Donnell	Golden-Kilfeacle	1949	1949
William O'Donnell	Golden-Kilfeacle	1937	1937, 1941
John O'Donoghue	Arravale Rovers	1962, 1964, 1965, 1971	1962, 1964, 1965, 1967, 1968, 1971
Conor O'Donovan	Nenagh Éire Óg	1989, 1991	1987, 1988, 1989, 1991
Willie O'Donovan	Toomevara	1958, 1961	1958, 1961
Conor O'Dwyer	Borrisokane	1964	1964
Jack O'Dwyer	Holycross-Ballycahill	1945, 1949	1945, 1949
Joe O'Dwyer	Killenaule		
M.J. O'Dwyer	Borris-Illeigh	1950	1950
Michael O'Dwyer	Holycross-Ballycahill	1908	1908
Noel O'Dwyer	Borris-Illeigh	1971	1968, 1971
Paddy O'Dwyer	Boherlahan-Dualla	1950	1950
Paddy O'Dwyer	Boherlahan-Dualla		1917
Philip O'Dwyer	Boherlahan-Dualla		
Ryan O'Dwyer	Cashel King Cormacs		2008
Sean O'Dwyer	Knockavilla-Donaghskeigh Kickhams		
Tommy O'Dwyer	Borris-Illeigh		
William O'Dwyer	Boherlahan-Dualla	1916	1916
Colm O'Flaherty	Cahir		
Matt O'Gara	Toomevara	1961, 1962	1961, 1962
Danny O'Gorman	Holycross-Ballycahill	1949	1949
Denis O'Gorman	Holycross-Ballycahill	1937	1937, 1941
Ned O'Gorman	Holycross-Ballycahill	1949	1949
Noel O’Gorman	Newport	1965	1965, 1967, 1968
Paddy O'Gorman	Thurles Sarsfields	1945	1945
Billy O'Grady	Moyne-Tempetuohy		
Dan O'Grady	Moyne-Tempetuohy		
Ger 'Redser' O'Grady	Thurles Sarsfields		
Jack O'Grady	Moycarkey-Borris	1899	1899
John O'Grady	Moycarkey-Borris	1958	1958
Tom O'Grady	Moycarkey-Borris	1899	1899
Danny O'Hanlon	Carrick Swans		
Bill O'Keeffe	Moycarkey-Borris	1945	1945
Denis O'Keeffe	Thurles Blues	1906	1906
Elias (Bud) O'Keeffe	Moyne-Tempetuohy		
Jim O'Keeffe	Moycarkey-Borris	1898, 1899, 1900	1898, 1899, 1900
Joe O'Keeffe	Moycarkey-Borris	1899, 1906, 1908	1899, 1906, 1908, 1909
Elias (Bud) O'Keeffe	Moyne-Tempetuohy		1913
Pat O'Keeffe	Killenaule		
Richard 'Dick' O'Keeffe	Moycarkey-Borris	1898, 1899	1898, 1899
Thomas O'Keeffe	Moycarkey-Borris	1945	1945
Mark O'Leary	Kilruane McDonaghs	2001	2001
James O'Loughlin	Thurles Sarsfields		
Conor O'Mahony	Newport	2010	2008, 2009, 2011, 2012, 2015
Bill O'Meara	Toomevara		
Brian O'Meara	Mullinahone	2001	2001
Brian O'Meara	Kilruane McDonaghs	2010	
Declan O'Meara	Toomevara		1993
Denis O'Meara	Kilruane McDonaghs		
Jack O'Meara	Toomevara	1916	1913, 1916, 1917, 1922, 1924
James O'Meara	Boherlahan-Dualla	1950, 1951	1950, 1951
Jim O'Meara	Toomevara		1924
Michael O'Meara	Toomevara	1991	1991, 1993
Pat O'Meara	Toomevara		
Sean O'Meara	Lorrha-Doorha		
Tom O'Meara	Toomevara	1930	1930
Tom O'Meara	Moyne-Tempetuohy		
Tom O'Meara	Roscrea	1950	1950
Eugene O'Neill	Cappawhite	2001	2001
Ger O'Neill	Cappawhite	1989, 1991	1987, 1988, 1989, 1991
John O'Neill	Cappawhite	1971	1971
John O'Neill	Clonoulty-Rossmore		
Pat O'Neill	Cappawhite		1988
Paddy O'Neill	Cappawhite		
Paul Ormonde	Loughmore-Castleiney	2001	2001, 2008
Éamonn O'Shea	Kilruane McDonaghs		
Geoff O'Shea	Cashel King Cormacs		
John O'Shea	Killenaule		
Ned O'Shea	Borris-Illeigh		
Kevin O'Sullivan	Cashel King Cormacs		
Liam O'Sullivan	Golden-Kilfeacle		
Peter O'Sullivan	Cashel King Cormacs	1964, 1965, 1971	1964, 1965, 1971
Stephen O'Sullivan	Moycarkey-Borris	1899	1899

== P ==
Name	Club	All-Ireland SHC Medals	Munster SHC Medals
Ned Pennefeather	Boherlahan-Dualla		
Oliver Perkins	Upperchurch-Drombane	1971	1971
Michael Phelan	Ballybacon-Grange		
Jack Power	Boherlahan-Dualla	1916, 1922, 1925	1916, 1917, 1922, 1924 1925
Paddy Power	Boherlahan-Dualla	1925	1917, 1922, 1924, 1925
Pat Power	Boherlahan-Dualla		
Seamus Power	Boherlahan-Dualla	1971	1971
Tom Power	Boherlahan-Dualla		
Jim Purcell	Upperchurch-Drombane		
Matty Purcell	Moycarkey-Borris		
Mick Purcell	Moycarkey-Borris	1900	1900
Paddy Purcell	Upperchurch-Drombane		
Phil Purcell	Moycarkey-Borris	1930	1930
Stephen Purcell	Thurles	1887	
Tommy Purcell	Moycarkey-Borris	1945, 1949	1945, 1949

== Q ==
Name	Club	All-Ireland SHC Medals	Munster SHC Medals
Peadar Queally	Roscrea		
Pat Quigley	Sean Treacy's		
Gerry Quinlan	Nenagh Éire Óg	1964	1964
Jim Quinlan	Moycarkey-Borris	1899	1899
Pat Quinlan	Silvermines	1971	1971
Bill Quinn	Thurles Blues	1925	1925
Billy Quin	Thurles Rahealty's		
James Quinn	Borris-Illeigh		
Liam Quinn	Holycross-Ballycahill		
Jim Quirke	Clonoulty-Rossmore		

== R ==
Name	Club	All-Ireland SHC Medals	Munster SHC Medals
Darragh Rabbite	Borris-Illeigh	2001	2001
Jack Raleigh	Emly		1913
Tony Reddin	Lorrha-Dorrha	1949, 1950, 1951	1949, 1950, 1951
Pat Reidy	Burgess		
Ray Reidy	Thurles Sarsfields	1958	1958, 1960
Paddy Riordan	Upperchurch-Drombane	1895, 1896, 1906	1895, 1896, 1906
Mick Roche	Carrick Davins	1964, 1965, 1971	1964, 1965, 1967, 1968, 1971
Thomas Roche	Carrick Davins	1971	1971
Fanny Rowland	Roscrea	1951	1951
Patsy Rowland	Roscrea		1968
Thomas Russell	Moyne-Templetuohy	1945	1945
William Russell	Roscrea	1950	
Aidan Ryan	Borris-Illeigh	1989, 1991	1987, 1988, 1989, 1991, 1993
Benny Ryan	Boherlahan-Dualla		
Bernard Ryan	Moycarkey-Borris		
Bill Ryan	Moycarkey-Borris	1925	1922, 1925
Bill Ryan	Thurles Sarsfields		
Bobby Ryan	Borris-Illeigh	1989, 1991	1987, 1988, 1989, 1991, 1993
Conor Ryan	Cappawhite		1988
Dan Ryan	De Wet		
Dan Ryan	Clonoulty-Rossmore		
Danny Ryan	Moycarkey-Borris	1887	1887
Declan Ryan	Clonoulty-Rossmore	1989, 1991, 2001	1988, 1989, 1991, 1993, 2001
Dinny Ryan	Roscrea	1949, 1950	1949, 1950
Donal Ryan	Cashel King Cormacs	1949, 1950, 1961	1949, 1950, 1960, 1961
E.D. Ryan	Cashel King Cormacs	1896, 1898	1896, 1898
Eamonn Ryan	Moycarkey-Borris		
Ed Ryan	Borris-Illeigh	1950	1950
Eugene Ryan	Moneygall		
Gearóid Ryan	Templederry Kenyons	2010	2009
Ger 'Bawn' Ryan	Cappawhite		1988
Jack Ryan	Moneygall	1971	1968, 1971
Jack Ryan	Roscrea	1945, 1949, 1950	1945, 1949, 1950
Jack Ryan	Tubberadora	1898	1898
James Ryan	Holycross-Ballycahill	1949, 1951	1949, 1951
James Ryan	Borrisokane		
James Ryan	Knockavilla-Donaghskeigh Kickhams		
Jer Ryan	Thurles	1887	1887
Jerry Ryan	Éire Óg Annacarty		1941
Jim Ryan	Upperchurch-Drombane		
Jimmy Ryan	Ballinahinch		
Jimmy Ryan	Carrick Davins	1964, 1971	1964, 1967, 1968, 1971
Jimmy Ryan	Moycarkey-Borris	1899	1899
Joe Ryan	Moycarkey-Borris	1899	1899
John Ryan	Moycarkey-Borris	1937	1937, 1941
John Ryan	Clonoulty-Rossmore		
Larry Ryan	Moycarkey-Borris		
Martin Ryan	Knockavilla-Donaghskeigh Kickhams		
Martin Ryan	Solohead		
Matty Ryan Jnr	Moycarkey-Borris		
Matty Ryan Snr	Moycarkey-Borris	1900	1900
Michael Ryan	Upperchurch-Drombane	1991	1991
Michael Ryan	Moneygall		
Michael Ryan	Ballinahinch	1991	1991
Michéal Ryan	Templederry Kenyons	2001	2001
Mick Ryan	Borris-Illeigh		
Mick Ryan	Clonmel Commercials		
Mick Ryan	Roscrea	1949, 1950, 1951	1949, 1950, 1951
Mick Ryan	Clonoulty-Rossmore		
Mick Ryan	Thurles Sarsfields	1930	1930
Mick Ryan	Boherlahan-Dualla		
Mick Ryan	Newport		
Mick Ryan	Toomevara		1913
Mike Ryan	Moycarkey-Borris		
Mutt Ryan	Moycarkey-Borris	1945, 1949	1945, 1949
Ned Ryan	Loughmore-Castleiney	1991	1991, 1993
Ned Ryan	Borris-Illeigh	1951	1951
Paddy Ryan	Moycarkey-Borris	1937	1937, 1941
Pat Ryan	Borris-Illeigh		
Pat Ryan	Moycarkey-Borris	1958, 1961, 1962, 1964	1958, 1960, 1961, 1962, 1964
Pat Ryan	Toomevara		
Pat Ryan	Boherlahan-Dualla		
Pat Ryan	Thurles Sarsfields	1887	1887
Paul Ryan	Templederry Kenyons		
Phil Ryan	Borris-Illeigh	1937, 1945, 1951	1937, 1945, 1951
Phil Ryan	Boherlahan-Dualla		
Philly Ryan	Boherlahan-Dualla	1950	1950
Phil Ryan	Moneygall		
PJ Ryan	Carrick Davins	1971	1967, 1968, 1971
Raymie Ryan	Cashel King Cormacs		1993
Roger Ryan	Toomevara	1971	1971
Roger Ryan	Roscrea		
Seamus Ryan	Moneygall		
Sean Ryan	Toomevara	1945	1945
Tim Ryan	Borris-Illeigh	1950, 1951	1950, 1951
Tom Ryan	Toomevara	1961, 1962, 1965	1961, 1962, 1965
Tom Ryan	Killenaule	1962	1960, 1962
Tom Ryan	Tubberadora	1895, 1896, 1898, 1899, 1900	1896
Tommy Ryan	Thurles Sarsfields	1945, 1949, 1950	1945, 1949, 1950
William Ryan	Borris-Illeigh		
William Ryan	Moycarkey-Borris		
William Ryan	Boherlahan-Dualla		
Willie Ryan	Toomevara		2008, 2009
Willie Ryan	Moycarkey-Borris	1971	1971
Willie Ryan	Moycarkey-Borris	1945	1945
Dinny Ryan Coole	Sean Treacy's	1971	1971

== S ==
Name	Club	All-Ireland SHC Medals	Munster SHC Medals
Bernie Sands	Roscrea	1937	1937
Phil Scanlan	Tubberadora	1896, 1898	1896, 1898
Tony Scroope	Burgess		2009
Michael Scully	Roscrea		
John Semple	Thurles Sarsfields		
TJ Semple	Thurles Sarsfields	1971	1971
Tom Semple	Thurles Blues	1900, 1906, 1908	1900, 1906, 1908, 1909
Mick Seymour	Portroe		
Noel Seymour	Kildangan	1971	1971
Mike Shanahan	Moycarkey-Borris		
Patsy Shanahan	Moycarkey-Borris		
Phil Shanahan	Toomevara	1949, 1950, 1951	1949, 1950, 1951
Philip Shanahan	Toomevara		
Tom Shanahan	Toomevara	1958, 1961	1958, 1961
Tom Shanahan	Killeanule	1916	1917, 1922
John Sheedy	Portroe		
Liam Sheedy	Portroe		
Pat Sheedy	Moneygall		
Noel Sheehy	Silvermines	1989, 1991	1987, 1988, 1989, 1991, 1993
Hugh Shelly	Thurles Blues	1906, 1908, 1916	1906, 1908, 1909, 1913, 1916, 1917
Paul Shelly	Killenaule		
Tony Sheppard	Kilruane MvcDonagh's		1987
Pat Shinnors	Newport		
Séamus Shinnors	Newport		1967, 1968
Jim Shortt	Upperchurch-Drombane		
Tom Skehan	Holycross-Ballycahill		
Liam Skelly	Holycross-Ballycahill		
Tom Slattery	Kildangan	1961	1961
Ronnie Slevin	Borrisokane	1962	1962
Bill Small	Borris-Illeigh		
Willie Smith	Clonakenny	1964	1964
Mick Spillane	Moycarkey-Borris		
Pake Spillane	Moycarkey-Borris		1922, 1924
Bob Stakelum	Holycross-Ballycahill	1949	1949
Conor Stakelum	Borris-Illeigh	1991	1988, 1991, 1993
John Stakelum	Holycross-Ballycahill	1949	1949
Pat Stakelum	Holycross-Ballycahill	1949, 1950, 1951, 1958	1949, 1950, 1951, 1958
Richard Stakelum	Borris-Illeigh	1989	1987, 1988, 1989
Gerry Stakelum	Borris-Illeigh		1987
Jack Stakelum	Thurles Blues	1930	1930
Jim Stapleton	Thurles	1887	1887
John Stapleton	Thurles Blues		
Matt Stapleton	Borris-Illeigh		1967, 1968
Paddy Stapleton	Borris-Illeigh	2010	2008, 2009
Paddy Stapleton	Thurles Blues	1900	
TF Stapleton	Borris-Illeigh		
Thomas Stapleton	Templederry Kenyons		2008, 2009
Timmy Stapleton	Borris-Illeigh		
Tom Stapleton	Thurles	1887	1887
William Stapleton	Holycross-Ballycahill	1949, 1950	1949, 1950
Pat Starr	De Wet		
Liam Stokes	Kilsheelan-Kilcash		
John Stone	Roscrea		
Jim Sullivan	Thurles	1887	1887
Evan Sweeney	Loughmore-Castleiney		
Shane Sweeney	Moyne-Tempetuohy		

== T ==
Name	Club	All-Ireland SHC Medals	Munster SHC Medals
Brendan Teehan	Gortnahoe-Glengoole	1971	1971
Timmy Tierney	Shannon Rovers		
Tony Tierney	Nenagh Éire Óg		1967
Jim Travers	Moyne-Tempetuohy		
Tommy Treacy	Killea	1930, 1937	1930, 1937, 1941
Eoin Troy	Moneygall		
Eddie Tucker	Nenagh Éire Óg		
Kevin Tucker	Nenagh Éire Óg		
Bob Turner	Holycross-Ballycahill		
Dick Tynan	Thurles Sarsfields	1958	1958
Joe Tynan	Roscrea		
Bill Tyrell	Tubberadora	1895	1895

== W ==
Name	Club	All-Ireland SHC Medals	Munster SHC Medals
Eddie Wade	Boherlahan-Dualla		
Mick Wade	Boherlahan-Dualla		
Ned Wade	Boherlahan-Dualla		
Mike Wall	Moycarkey-Borris	1896, 1898, 1899, 1900	1896, 1898, 1899, 1900
Tom Wall	Carrick Swans	1945	1945
Tony Wall	Thurles Sarsfields	1958, 1961, 1962, 1964, 1965	1958, 1960, 1961, 1962, 1964, 1965, 1967
William Wall	Carrick Swans	1937, 1945	1937, 1945
Denis Walsh	Tubberadora	1895, 1896, 1898, 1899, 1916	1895, 1896, 1898, 1899, 1916
Dick Walsh	Boherlahan-Dualla	1916	1916, 1917
Jackie Walsh	Carrick Davins		
John Walsh Jr	Boherlahan-Dualla	1950, 1951	1950, 1951
John Walsh Sr	Tubberadora	1895, 1896, 1898, 1899, 1900	1895, 1896, 1898, 1899, 1900
Mick Walsh	Carrick Swans		
Ned Walsh	Killenaule		
Richard Walsh	Boherlahan-Dualla		
Thomas Walsh	Thurles Sarsfields	1965	1965
Thomas Walsh	Carrick Swans		
Willie Walsh	Carrick Swans		
Tom Waters	Carrick Swans		
Michéal Webster	Loughmore-Casrleiney		2008, 2009
Din Whelan	De Wet		
Tom Whelan	Moycarkey-Borris	1900	1900
Michael White	Borris-Illeigh	1951	1951
Gilbert Williams	Kilruane MacDonagh's		
Jerry Williams	Kilruane MacDonagh's		1987
Jim Williams	Kilruane MacDonagh's		
Neil Williams	Toomevara	1961	1961
Paddy Williams	Kilruane MacDonagh's		
Pat Williams	De Wet		
Sean Williams	Kilruane MacDonagh's		1960
James Woodlock	Drom-Inch		2008, 2009

== Y ==
Name	Club	All-Ireland SHC Medals	Munster SHC Medals
Damien Young	Drom-Inch		
David Young	Toomevara	2010	
Mick Young	Toomevara	1971	1971
