= North Tipperary Senior Hurling Championship =

Hurling competition in Ireland

- Code: Hurling
- Founded: 1901; 125 years ago
- Region: North Tipperary (GAA)
- Trophy: Frank McGrath Cup
- No. of teams: 13
- Title holders: Borris-Ileigh (15th title)
- First winner: Lahorna De Wets
- Most titles: Toomevara (33 titles)
- Sponsors: Munster Solar
- Official website: Official website

The North Tipperary Senior Hurling Championship (known for sponsorship reasons as the Hibernian Inn North Tipperary Senior Hurling Championship) is an annual hurling competition organised by the North Tipperary Board of the Gaelic Athletic Association since 1907 for senior hurling teams in North Tipperary, Ireland.

The series of games begins in March, with the championship culminating with the final in August. The championship has always been played using a knock-out format.

The North Tipperary Championship was, until recent times, an integral part of the wider Tipperary Senior Hurling Championship. The winners and runners-up of the North Tipperary Championship joined their counterparts from the other three divisions to contest the county championship quarter-finals.

13 clubs currently participate in the North Tipperary Championship. The title has been won at least once by 16 teams. The all-time record-holders are Toomevara who have won a total of 33 titles.

Borris-Ileigh beat Nenagh Éire Og in a thrilling final after extra time on Sunday 12th of July 2026 on a scoreline of 2-29 to 3-25. It was their first North title since 2017.

== The championship ==
=== Overview ===
The North Tipperary Championship is a knockout tournament with pairings drawn at random — there are no seeds.

Each match is played as a single leg. If a match ends as a draw there is a period of extra time, followed by a second period of extra time should the teams remain deadlocked. If both sides are still level at the end of extra time a replay takes place and so on until a winner is found.

=== Format ===
Round 1: 10 teams contest this round. The 5 winning teams advance to the quarter-finals. The 5 losing teams are eliminated from the championship.

Quarter-finals: 8 teams contest this round: the 5 winning teams from round 1 and 3 teams who received a bye. The 4 winning teams advance to the semi-finals. The 4 losing teams are eliminated from the championship.

Semi-finals: 4 teams contest this round. The 2 winning teams advance to the final. The 2 losing teams are eliminated from the championship.

Final: The final is contested by the two semi-final winners.

== Roll of honour ==
| # | Team | Wins | Years won |
|---|---|---|---|
| 1 | Toomevara | 33 | 1910, 1911, 1912, 1913, 1916, 1917, 1918, 1919, 1922, 1923, 1925, 1926, 1927, 1928, 1929, 1930, 1931, 1946, 1958, 1960, 1961, 1962, 1991, 1994, 1995, 1997, 1999, 2000, 2002, 2003, 2006, 2010, 2011 |
| 2 | Kilruane MacDonaghs | 19(7) | 1940, 1944, 1959, 1965, 1977, 1978, 1979, 1985, 1986, 1987, 1990, 2018 1901, 1902, 1903,1904, 1906,1907, 1908 (Lahorna De Wets) |
| 3 | Roscrea | 17 | 1936, 1937, 1939, 1941, 1942, 1945, 1949, 1954, 1963, 1967, 1968, 1969, 1970, 1971, 1980, 1982, 2004 |
| 4 | Borris-Ileigh | 15 | 1950, 1951, 1952, 1953, 1955, 1972, 1973, 1976, 1981, 1983, 1988, 2005, 2007, 2017, 2026 |
| 5 | Nenagh Éire Óg | 11 | 1915, 1957, 1964, 1992, 1993, 1998, 2001, 2009, 2014, 2022, 2023 |
| 6 | Kiladangan | 10 | 1938, 1943, 2008, 2013, 2015, 2016, 2019, 2021, 2024, 2025 |
| 7 | Lorrha | 8 | 1905, 1914, 1924, 1948, 1956, 1966, 1984, 1989 |
| 8 | Newport | 3 | 1932, 1935, 1996 |
| 9 | Borrisokane | 1 | 1933 |
| 9 | Kilbarron-Kildangan | 1 | 1934 |
| 9 | Youghalarra | 1 | 1942 |
| 9 | Borrisoleigh | 1 | 1947 |
| 9 | Silvermines | 1 | 1974 |
| 9 | Moneygall | 1 | 1975 |
| 9 | Portroe | 1 | 2012 |

== Finals ==
| Year | Winner | Score | Opponent | Score |
|---|---|---|---|---|
| 2026 | Borris-Ileigh | 2-29 | Nenagh Éire Óg | 3-25 AET |
| 2025 | Kiladangan | 0-20 | Borris-Ileigh | 0-19 |
| 2024 | Kiladangan | 1-22 | Toomevara | 1-19 |
| 2023 | Nenagh Éire Óg | 0-21 | Kiladangan | 0-17 |
| 2022 | Nenagh Éire Óg | 2-20 | Kiladangan | 2-18 |
| 2021 | Kiladangan | 2-18 | Kilruane MacDonaghs | 1-16 |
| 2020 | No Championship (Covid19) | | | |
| 2019 | Kiladangan | 2-13 | Borris-Ileigh | 1-08 |
| 2018 | Kilruane MacDonaghs | 0-19 | Kiladangan | 0-12 |
| 2017 | Borris-Ileigh | 2-19 | Nenagh Éire Óg | 0-18 |
| 2016 | Kiladangan | 2-18 | Kilruane MacDonaghs | 1-17 |
| 2015 | Kiladangan | 1-18 | Templederry Kenyons | 0-18 |
| 2014 | Nenagh Éire Óg | 1-20 (0-14 R) | Burgess | 2-17 (0-08 R) |
| 2013 | Kiladangan | 5-15 | Silvermines | 0-08 |
| 2012 | Portroe | 3-16 | Toomevara | 1-19 |
| 2011 | Toomevara | 1-18 | Kiladangan | 0-13 |
| 2010 | Toomevara | 1-12 | Borris-Ileigh | 0-13 |
| 2009 | Nenagh Éire Óg | 0-24 | Portroe | 2-12 |
| 2008 | Kiladangan | 1-17 | Burgess | 2-12 |
| 2007 | Borris-Ileigh | 0-19 | Nenagh Éire Óg | 0-16 |
| 2006 | Toomevara | 1-15 | Kiladangan | 0-12 |
| 2005 | Borris-Ileigh | 1-12 | Nenagh Éire Óg | 0-13 |
| 2004 | Roscrea | 0-13 | Borris-Ileigh | 1-09 |
| 2003 | Toomevara | 3-12 | Nenagh Éire Óg | 0-16 |
| 2002 | Toomevara | 0-19 | Moneygall | 1-07 |
| 2001 | Nenagh Éire Óg | 1-15 | Borris-Ileigh | 1-11 |
| 2000 | Toomevara | 3-13 | Moneygall | 1-10 |
| 1999 | Toomevara | 2-19 | Nenagh Éire Óg | 2-15 |
| 1998 | Nenagh Éire Óg | 1-11 | Toomevara | 0-11 |
| 1997 | Toomevara | 1-15 | Borris-Ileigh | 0-08 |
| 1996 | Newport | 1-9 (2-13 R) | Lorrha-Dorrha | 0-12 (3-6 R) |
| 1995 | Toomevara | 0-18 | Borris-Ileigh | 1-12 |
| 1994 | Toomevara | 1-16 | Kilruane MacDonaghs | 0-7 |
| 1993 | Nenagh Éire Óg | 0-14 | Moneygall | 0-12 |
| 1992 | Nenagh Éire Óg | 1-18 | Lorrha-Dorrha | 0-08 |
| 1991 | Toomevara | 0-12 (2-11 R) | Nenagh Éire Óg | 0-12 (2-07 R) |
| 1990 | Kilruane MacDonaghs | 2-07 | Toomevara | 0-05 |
| 1989 | Lorrha-Dorrha | 1-14 | Toomevara | 1-12 |
| 1988 | Borris-Ileigh | 1-14 | Roscrea | 1-07 |
| 1987 | Kilruane MacDonaghs | 2-15 | Lorrha-Dorrha | 0-13 |
| 1986 | Kilruane MacDonaghs | 1-12 | Toomevara | 2-06 |
| 1985 | Kilruane MacDonaghs | 2-10 | Roscrea | 1-10 |
| 1984 | Lorrha-Dorrha | 4-11 | Nenagh Éire Óg | 3-09 |
| 1983 | Borris-Ileigh | 1-11 | Lorrha-Dorrha | 2-06 |
| 1982 | Roscrea | | Nenagh Éire Óg | |
| 1981 | Borris-Ileigh | 1-08 | Roscrea | 1-06 |
| 1980 | Roscrea | 1-09 (5-06 R) | Kilruane MacDonaghs | 0-12 (2-12 R) |
| 1979 | Kilruane MacDonaghs | 1-12 | Moneygall | 1-09 |
| 1978 | Kilruane MacDonaghs | 3-06 | Roscrea | 1-11 |
| 1977 | Kilruane MacDonaghs | 1-12 | Borris-Ileigh | 2-07 |
| 1976 | Borris-Ileigh | 4-11 | Lorrha-Dorrha | 3-05 |
| 1975 | Moneygall | 2-10 | Silvermines | 1-11 |
| 1974 | Silvermines | 4-07 | Roscrea | 1-10 |
| 1973 | Borris-Ileigh | 3-06 | Kilruane MacDonaghs | 2-08 |
| 1972 | Borris-Ileigh | 2-09 | Lorrha-Dorrha | 0-04 |
| 1971 | Roscrea | 3-08 | Borris-Ileigh | 3-05 |
| 1970 | Roscrea | 3-09 | Moneygall | 3-03 |
| 1969 | Roscrea | 5-09 | Lorrha-Dorrha | 2-04 |
| 1968 | Roscrea | 2-15 | Borris-Ileigh | 3-07 |
| 1967 | Roscrea | 4-15 | Moneygall | 3-08 |
| 1966 | Lorrha-Dorrha | 3-11 | Toomevara | 2-13 |
| 1965 | Kilruane MacDonaghs | 3-10 | Lorrha-Dorrha | 5-02 |
| 1964 | Nenagh Éire Óg | 5-12 | Roscrea | 2-08 |
| 1963 | Roscrea | 2-12 | Toomevara | 1-08 |
| 1962 | Toomevara | 4-09 | Kilruane MacDonaghs | 5-04 |
| 1961 | Toomevara | 4-14 | Borrisokane | 3-04 |
| 1960 | Toomevara | 4-12 | Kilruane MacDonaghs | 1-03 |
| 1959 | Kilruane MacDonaghs | 0-11 | Toomevara | 1-04 |
| 1958 | Toomevara | 6-13 | Kilruane MacDonaghs | 4-03 |
| 1957 | Nenagh Éire Óg | 5-05 | Toomevara | 4-05 |
| 1956 | Lorrha-Dorrha | 4-08 | Borris-Ileigh | 0-18 |
| 1955 | Borris-Ileigh | 3-10 | Roscrea | 2-09 |
| 1954 | Roscrea | 5-04 | Borris-Ileigh | 0-11 |
| 1953 | Borris-Ileigh | 3-12 | Kilruane MacDonaghs | 1-06 |
| 1952 | Borris-Ileigh | 3-08 | Kilruane MacDonaghs | 0-04 |
| 1951 | Borris-Ileigh | 2-10 | Roscrea | 3-05 |
| 1950 | Borris-Ileigh | 3-07 | Roscrea | 1-05 |
| 1949 | Roscrea | 4-07 | Nenagh Éire Óg (St. Mary's) | |
| 1948 | Lorrha-Dorrha | 5-04 | Borris-Ileigh | 2-05 |
| 1947 | Borrisoleigh | 4-03 | Kilruane MacDonaghs | 2-06 |
| 1946 | Toomevara | 6-07 | Roscrea | 2-04 |
| 1945 | Roscrea | 5-06 | Kiladangan | 1-04 |
| 1944 | Kilruane MacDonaghs | 4-07 | Duharra | 2-03 |
| 1943 | Kiladangan | 6-02 | Roscrea | 5-04 |
| 1942 | Roscrea | 7-05 | Kiladangan | 7-04 |
| 1941 | Roscrea | 6-03 | Kilruane MacDonaghs | 2-07 |
| 1940 | Kilruane MacDonaghs | 2-05 | Kiladangan | 3-01 |
| 1939 | Roscrea | 8-03 | Nenagh Éire Óg | 1-03 |
| 1938 | Kiladangan | 7-02 | Roscrea | 3-04 |
| 1937 | Roscrea | 6-02 | Kiladangan | 4-05 |
| 1936 | Roscrea | 5-03 | Kiladangan | 3-00 |
| 1935 | Newport | 6-04 | Kilruane MacDonaghs | 5-04 |
| 1934 | Kilbarron-Kiladangan | 5-06 | Roscrea | 4-09 |
| 1933 | Borrisokane | 2-07 | Toomevara | 2-02 |
| 1932 | Newport | | Toomevara | |
| 1931 | Toomevara | 7-01 | Borris-Ileigh | 1-03 |
| 1930 | Toomevara | 5-08 | Borris-Ileigh | 1-06 |
| 1929 | Toomevara | 5-04 | Duharra | 0-02 |
| 1928 | Toomevara | 6-03 | Nenagh Éire Óg | 5-00 |
| 1927 | Toomevara | 3-07 | Youghalarra | 0-01 |
| 1926 | Toomevara | 5-04 | Youghalarra | 2-00 |
| 1925 | Toomevara/Moneygall | 9-03 | Youghalarra | 6-02 |
| 1924 | Lorrha-Dorrha | 7-03 | Nenagh Éire Óg | 0-03 |
| 1923 | Toomevara | 7-00 | Nenagh Éire Óg | 1-02 |
| 1922 | Toomevara | | Borrisokane | |
| 1921 | No Championship | | | |
| 1920 | No Championship | | | |
| 1919 | Toomevara | 1-04 | Lorrha-Dorrha | 1-02 |
| 1918 | Toomevara | | Glenahilty | |
| 1917 | Toomevara | | Moneygall | |
| 1916 | Toomevara | 3-01 | Moneygall | 1-02 |
| 1915 | Nenagh Éire Óg | 3-03 | Moneygall | 3-02 |
| 1914 | Lorrha-Dorrha | 4-02 | Templederry | 1-00 |
| 1913 | Toomevara | 4-06 | Borrisokane | 1-02 |
| 1912 | Toomevara | 7-03 | Ballina | 0-01 |
| 1911 | Toomevara | 7-00 | Lahorna Da Wets | 3-00 |
| 1910 | Toomevara | 4-05 | Roscrea | 0-03 |
| 1909 | Youghalarra | 3-05 | Clonakenny | 2-03 |
| 1908 | Lahorna Da Wets | | - | |
| 1907 | Lahorna Da Wets | | - | |
| 1906 | Lahorna Da Wets | 4-06 | Lorrha-Dorrha | 1-04 |
| 1905 | Lorrha-Dorrha | 3-05 | Lahorna Da Wets | 2-03 |
| 1904 | Lahorna Da Wets | 5-08 | Ballycommon | 1-01 |
| 1903 | Lahorna Da Wets | 3-08 | Ballycommon | 1-03 |
| 1902 | Lahorna Da Wets | 2-05 | Knigh | 1-01 |
| 1901 | Lahorna Da Wets | 4-01 | Roscrea | 0-03 |

KEY
| Years when final resulted in a walkover OR no score available OR league format |
