= North Tipperary GAA =

Gaelic Athletic Association division

North Tipperary GAA (CLG Tiobraid Árann Thuaidh) is a Gaelic Athletic Association division in County Tipperary, Ireland founded in 1901. The division is one of four affiliated to the Tipperary County Board. It organises competitions for the clubs within the division, from Under 12 up to the adult level in both hurling and Gaelic football. There are currently 18 active GAA clubs in the division. The division plays almost exclusively hurling, with only 2 clubs playing above Junior A Football. Kilruane MacDonaghs are the only north club to have won the Tipperary Senior Football Championship, winning their sole title in 1975. However 4 additional titles have been won by north combination sides, the most recent being Thomas MacDonaghs in 2011. North Tipperary clubs have won 45 Tipperary Senior Hurling titles, the second most of any division. The most successful club is Toomevara with 21 wins. The last victorous north club was Kiladangan in 2023.

== Clubs ==
- Ballina
- Ballinahinch
- Borris-Ileigh
- Borrisokane
- Burgess
- Kiladangan
- Kilruane MacDonaghs
- Knockshegowna
- Lorrha-Dorrha
- Moneygall
- Nenagh Éire Óg
- Newport
- Portroe
- Roscrea
- Shannon Rovers
- Silvermines
- Templederry Kenyons
- Toomevara

== Hurling ==
=== Championship Grades ===
Championship	Clubs
Senior
Senior	Borris-Ileigh
Senior	Kiladangan
Senior	Kilruane MacDonaghs
Senior	Nenagh Éire Óg
Senior	Roscrea
Senior	Toomevara
Intermediate
Premier Intermediate	Ballina
Premier Intermediate	Burgess
Premier Intermediate	Lorrha-Dorrha
Premier Intermediate	Moneygall
Premier Intermediate	Silvermines
Intermediate	Borrisokane
Intermediate	Newport
Intermediate	Portroe
Intermediate	Shannon Rovers
Intermediate	Templederry Kenyons
Junior
Junior A	Ballinahinch
Junior A	Borris-Ileigh (2)
Junior A	Kiladangan (2)
Junior A	Kilruane MacDonaghs (2)
Junior A	Nenagh Éire Óg (2)
Junior A	Newport (2)
Junior A	Roscrea (2)
Junior A	Silvermines (2)
Junior A	Toomevara (2)
Junior B	Ballina (2)
Junior B	Borrisokane (2)
Junior B	Burgess (2)
Junior B	Kiladangan (3)
Junior B	Kilruane MacDonaghs (3)
Junior B	Knockshegowna
Junior B	Lorrha-Dorrha (2)
Junior B	Moneygall (2)
Junior B	Portroe (2)
Junior B	Roscrea (3)
Junior B	Templederry Kenyons (2)
Junior B	Toomevara (3)
Junior C	Ballina (3)
Junior C	Ballinahinch (2)
Junior C	Borris-Ileigh (3)
Junior C	Burgess (3)
Junior C	Lorrha-Dorrha (3)
Junior C	Moneygall (3)
Junior C	Nenagh Éire Óg (3)
Junior C	Newport (3)
Junior C	Shannon Rovers (2)
Junior C	Silvermines (3)

== Football ==
=== Championship Grades ===
Championship	Clubs
Senior
Senior	Ballina
Intermediate
Intermediate	No clubs
Junior
Premier Junior	Borrisokane
Junior A	Ballinahinch
Junior A	Burgess
Junior A	Kiladangan
Junior A	Kilruane MacDonaghs
Junior A	Nenagh Éire Óg
Junior A	Newport
Junior A	Roscrea
Junior A	Shannon Rovers
Junior B	Portroe

=== Non-football clubs ===
Clubs who do not play football at any level are (1)

- Knockshegowna (Last competed in 2025)

Underage football only (6)

- Borris-Ileigh
- Lorrha-Dorrha
- Moneygall
- Silvermines
- Templederry Kenyons
- Toomevara

== Divisional Competitions ==
=== Legend ===
- Gold – County champions
- Silver – County runners-up

Competition	Year	Champions	Runners-up
Championship
North Tipperary Senior Hurling Championship	2026	Borris-Ileigh	Nenagh Éire Óg
North Tipperary Senior Football Championship	2010	Thomas MacDonaghs	Father John Kenyons
North Tipperary Premier Intermediarte Hurling Championship	2026	Silvermines	Ballina
North Tipperary Intermediate Hurling Championship	2026	Portroe	Newport
North Tipperary Intermediate Football Championship	2014	Roscrea	Borrisokane
North Tipperary Premier Junior Football Championship	2025	Borrisokane	Kiladangan
North Tipperary Junior A Hurling Championship	2026	Kilruane MacDonaghs	Roscrea
North Tipperary Junior A Football Championship	2026	Shannon Rovers	Nenagh Éire Óg
North Tipperary Junior B Hurling Championship	2026	Ballina	Newport
North Tipperary Junior B Football Championship	2025	Moneygall	Silvermines
North Tipperary Junior C Hurling Championship	2026	Ballina	Silvermines
North Tipperary U21A Hurling Championship	2026	Borris-Ileigh	Kilruane MacDonaghs
North Tipperary U21B Hurling Championship	2026	Newport	Roscrea
North Tipperary U21A Football Championship	2026	Ballina	Nenagh Éire Óg
North Tipperary U21B Football Championship	2026	Naomh Eoin (Note: Naomh Eoin is an amalgamation of Borrisokane and Shannon Rovers.)	Moneygall

== Former Clubs ==
=== Moved to West Tipperary in 1930 ===
- Seán Treacys
