= Jason Forde =

Irish hurler (born 1993)

Personal information
- Native name: Iásón Mac Giollarnáth (Irish)
- Born: 22 December 1993 (age 32) Nenagh, County Tipperary, Ireland
- Occupation: Secondary school teacher
- Height: 6 ft 1 in (185 cm)

Sport
- Sport: Hurling
- Position: Full-forward
Club
- Years: Club
- 2010–: Silvermines
Club titles
- Tipperary titles: 0
College
- Years: College
- 2013–2018: University of Limerick
College titles
- Fitzgibbon titles: 2
Inter-county*
Years	County	Apps (scores)
2013–	Tipperary	54 (15-288)
Inter-county titles
- Munster titles: 2
- All-Irelands: 3
- NHL: 0
- All Stars: 0
- *Inter County team apps and scores correct as of match played 20 July 2025.

Jason Forde (born 22 December 1993) is an Irish hurler who plays for Tipperary senior Championship club Silvermines and at inter-county level with the Tipperary county hurling team. He usually lines out as a left corner-forward.

== Playing career ==
=== Nenagh CBS ===
On 25 February 2012, Forde lined out at centre-forward when Nengh CBS faced Coláiste na nDéise in the Harty Cup final. He top scored for Nenagh with 1-04, however, he ended on the losing side following a 2–14 to 1–10 defeat. Forde was switched to full-forward when he captained Nenagh CBS in the All-Ireland final against Kilkenny CBS on 31 March 2012. He ended the game as top scorer with 2-02 and claimed a winners' medal following the 3–10 to 2–11 victory.

=== University of Limerick ===
As a student at the University of Limerick, Forde joined the senior hurling team during his second year. On 1 March 2015, he was selected at midfield when UL faced the Waterford Institute of Technology in the Fitzgibbon Cup final. Forde scored 1–01 in the 0–21 to 3–12 draw. He was switched to left corner-forward for the replay on 11 March. Forde ended the game with 0-01 from a sideline and collected a winners' medal following the 2–18 to 1–14 defeat.

Forde lined out in a second successive Fitzgibbon Cup final on 27 February 2016. He was selected at centre-back and scored a point in the 1–30 to 3–22 defeat by Mary Immaculate College.

On 24 February 2018, Forde lined out in a third Fitzgibbon Cup final when UL faced DCU Dóchas Éireann. He top scored with 1-10 from full-forward and collected a second winners' medal following a 2–21 to 2–15 victory.

=== Silvermines ===
Forde joined the Silvermines club at a young age and played in all grades at juvenile and underage levels before eventually joining the club's top adult team in the Tipperary Intermediate Championship.

On 14 October 2012, Forde lined out at full-forward when Silvermines faced Ballina in the Tipperary Intermediate Championship final. He top scored with 1-10 and secured the man of the match award following a 2–21 to 0–10 victory. On 24 November 2012, Forde won a Munster Championship medal after scoring 0–07 in a 0–14 to 0–08 defeat of Ballyduff in the final.

=== Tipperary ===
==== Minor and under-21 ====
Forde was just 16-years-old when he was selected for the Tipperary minor hurling team prior to the start of the 2010 Munster Championship. He made his first appearance for the team on 5 May 2010 when he lined out at midfield in Tipperary's 0–17 to 1–13 defeat by Clare.

Forde was again eligible for the Tipperary minor team in 2011 and was appointed captain for the year. His minor career ended with a 3–13 to 1–13 defeat by Clare on 24 June 2011.

On 18 July 2012, Forde made his first appearance for the Tipperary under-21 team. He came on as a 30th-minute substitute in a 1–16 to 1–11 defeat of Limerick. Forde broke onto the starting fifteen for the Munster final on 8 August 2012 when he was selected at right corner-forward. He scored a point from play in the 1–16 to 1–14 defeat by Clare.

Forde lined out in a second successive Munster final on 7 August 2013. He top scored with 2-07 from centre-forward in the 1–17 to 2–10 defeat by Clare. Forde was the championship's top scorer, while his 5-25 from three games remains the highest ever tally by an individual in the Munster Championship.

Forde was appointed captain of the Tipperary under-21 team for the 2014 Munster Championship. He played his last game in the grade on 16 July 2014 when he scored 0–12 in a 5–19 to 1–25 defeat by Clare.

==== Senior ====
Forde was added to the Tipperary senior team in advance of the 2013 National League. He made his first appearance for the team on 23 February 2013 when he scored 0-02 from right corner-forward in a 0–26 to 1–11 defeat by Cork. On 5 May 2013, Forde came on as a 57th-minute substitute for Séamus Callanan when Tipperary suffered a 2–17 to 0–20 defeat by Kilkenny in the National League final. He was later named on the starting fifteen for Tipperary's Munster semi-final against Limerick on 9 June 2013, however, he was a late withdrawal after suffering from a stomach bug the night before the match. Forde eventually made his championship debut on 6 July 2013 when he came on as a 52nd-minute substitute for Patrick Maher in a 0–20 to 1–14 defeat by Kilkenny in an All-Ireland Qualifier.

On 4 May 2014, Forde was an unused substitute when Tipperary suffered a 2–25 to 1–27 defeat by Kilkenny in the National League final. On 7 September 2014, he was named on the bench for the All-Ireland final against Kilkenny. Forde was introduced as a 66th-minute substitute and scored a point in the 1–28 to 3–22 draw. He was again introduced as a substitute in the replay on 27 September 2014, however, he ended the game on the losing side following a 2-17 t 2–14 defeat.

On 12 July 2015, Forde lined out at right wing-forward in his first Munster final. He scored 0-02 from play and ended the game with a Munster Championship medal following Tipperary's 0–21 to 0–16 defeat of Waterford.

On 10 July 2016, Forde started the Munster final against Waterford on the bench. He came on as a 50th-minute substitute for Niall O'Meara and collected a second successive winners' medal following the 5–19 to 0–13 victory. Forde was again named on the bench for the All-Ireland final against Kilkenny on 4 September 2016. He was the first substitute to be introduced in the 44th minute when he came on for Michael Breen at midfield. Forde scored 0-02 from play and ended the game with an All-Ireland medal following a 2–29 to 2–20 victory.

On 16 April 2017, Forde became involved in an on-field scuffle with Wexford manager Davy Fitzgerald during the National League semi-final. He was able to line out in the subsequent 3–21 to 0–14 defeat by Galway in the final, however, Forde subsequently received a one-match suspension.

Forde played in a second successive National League final on 8 April 2018. Lining out at full-forward he top scored with 2-12 but ended on the losing side following a 2–23 to 2–17 defeat by Kilkenny. Forde ended the National League as top scorer with 7-72 from seven games. He ended the season by being nominated for an All-Star.

On 30 June 2019, Forde was selected at right wing-forward when Tipperary qualified to play Limerick in the Munster final. He scored six points, including three from frees, in the 2–26 to 2–14 defeat. On 18 August 2019, Forde lined out at left wing-forward when Tipperary faced Kilkenny in the All-Ireland final. He top scored for the team with eight points and ended the game with a second All-Ireland winners' medal following the 3–25 to 0–20 victory. Forde ended the season by receiving an All-Star nomination.

On 20 July in the 2025 All-Ireland final, Forde started in the full-forward line as Tipperary defeated Cork by 3–27 to 1-19 and claim a 29th All-Ireland title.

=== Ireland ===
On 17 October 2018, it was announced that Forde had been included on the Ireland national hurling team for the Shinty/Hurling International Series. He lined out at centre-forward in the 1–11 to 1–09 defeat by Scotland on 20 October 2018.

== Career statistics ==
As of match played 20 July 2025

Team	Year	National League			Munster		All-Ireland		Total	
Team	Year	Division	Apps	Score	Apps	Score	Apps	Score	Apps	Score
Tipperary	2013	Division 1A	6	0-07	—		1	0-00	7	0-07
Tipperary	2014	Division 1A	5	1-02	—		5	0-02	10	1-04
Tipperary	2015	Division 1A	7	1-11	2	1-05	1	0-01	10	2-17
Tipperary	2016	Division 1A	2	1-06	3	0-02	2	0-02	7	1-10
Tipperary	2017	Division 1A	7	1-08	—		4	0-08	11	1-16
Tipperary	2018	Division 1A	7	7-72	4	3-39	—		11	10-111
Tipperary	2019	Division 1A	5	1-26	5	1-35	3	1-32	13	3-93
Tipperary	2020	Division 1A	5	1-44	1	0-10	2	1-12	8	3-66
Tipperary	2021	Division 1A	5	4-41	2	1-19	1	0-12	8	5-72
Tipperary	2022	Division 1A	5	1-47	3	0-16	—		8	1-63
Tipperary	2023	Division 1A	4	2-45	2	2-10	2	2-21	8	6-76
Tipperary	2024	Division 1A	4	1-37	3	0-17	—		7	1-54
Tipperary	2025	Division 1A	4	0-20	4	0-27	4	3-18	12	3-65
Total			66	21-366	29	8-180	25	7-108	119	34-650

== Honours ==
Individual

- GAA/GPA Player of the Month (1): April 2018

Nenagh CBS

- Dr. Croke Cup (1): 2012

University of Limerick

- Fitzgibbon Cup (2): 2015, 2018

Silvermines

- Munster Intermediate Hurling Championship (1): 2012
- Tipperary Intermediate Hurling Championship (1): 2012

Tipperary

- All-Ireland Senior Hurling Championship (3): 2016, 2019, 2025
- Munster Senior Hurling Championship (2): 2015, 2016
