= Dan Troy (hurler) =

Irish hurler

Personal information
- Native name: Dónall Ó Troithigh (Irish)
- Born: 1897 Newport, County Tipperary, Ireland
- Died: 18 December 1953 (aged 56) Limerick, Ireland
- Occupation: Labourer

Sport
- Sport: Hurling
- Position: Full-back
Clubs
- Years: Club
- Newport; Claughaun
Club titles
- Limerick titles: 2
Inter-county
- Years: County
- Limerick
Inter-county titles
- Munster titles: 1
- All-Irelands: 1

Daniel Troy (1897 - 18 December 1953) was an Irish hurler. At club level he played with Newport and Claughaun, and also lined out at inter-county level with the Limerick senior hurling team.

== Career ==
Troy first played hurling at club level with the Newport club in Tipperary. He later joined the Claughaun club after moving to Limerick, and made his first appearances for the team during their Limerick SHC-winning campaign in 1918. Troy's performances at club level resulted in his inclusion on the Limerick senior hurling team. He soon won a Munster SHC medal before lining out in Limerick's defeat 9-05 to 1-03 of Wexford in the 1918 All-Ireland final. Troy sustained a serious injury during the game which resulted in a prolonged period of absence from both club and inter-county hurling. He won a second Limerick SHC medal in 1926.

== Death ==
Troy died suddenly on 18 December 1953, at the age of 56. He was the first member of Limerick's 1918 All-Ireland-winning team to die.

== Honours ==
Claughan

- Limerick Senior Hurling Championship: 1918, 1926

Limerick

- All-Ireland Senior Hurling Championship: 1918
- Munster Senior Hurling Championship: 1918
