= Conor O'Mahony =

Irish hurler (born 1984)

Conor O’Mahony
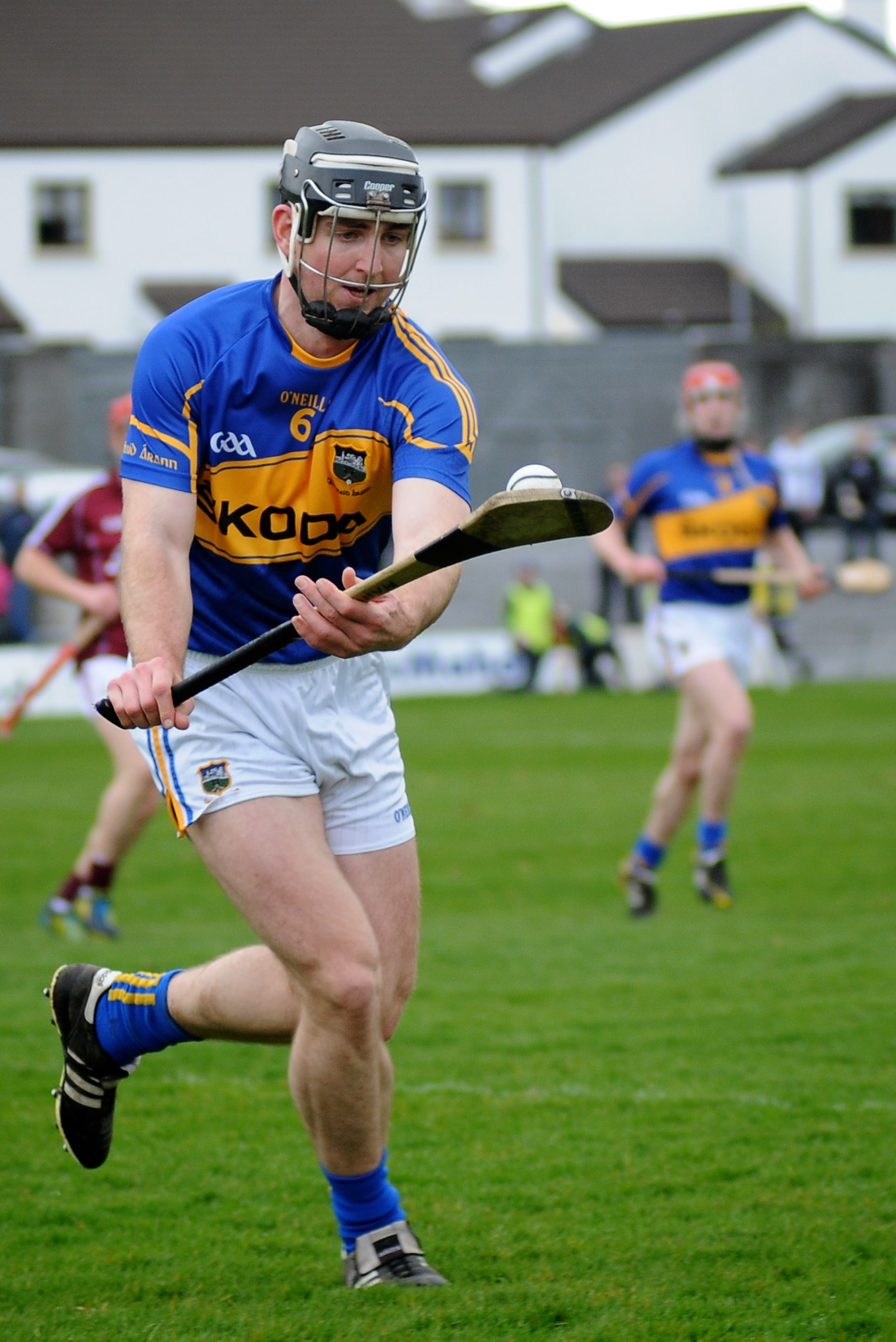
- Conor O'Mahony in action for Tipperary against Galway in the 2014 National Hurling League

Personal information
- Native name: Conchúr Ó Mathúna (Irish)
- Born: 18 October 1984 (age 42) Newport, County Tipperary, Ireland
- Occupation: Sales representative
- Height: 6 ft 1 in (185 cm)

Sport
- Sport: Hurling
- Position: Centre-back
Club
- Years: Club
- Newport
College
- Years: College
- Limerick IT
College titles
- Fitzgibbon titles: 2
Inter-county*
Years	County	Apps (scores)
2005–2015	Tipperary	42 (0–9)
Inter-county titles
- Munster titles: 5
- All-Irelands: 1
- NHL: 1
- All Stars: 2
- *Inter County team apps and scores correct as of 16:34, 31 October 2012.

Conor O'Mahony (born 18 October 1984) is an Irish hurler who played as a centre-back for the Tipperary senior team from 2005 up to 2015.

O'Mahony made his first appearance for the team during the 2005 National League and immediately became a regular member of the starting fifteen. During that time he has won one All-Ireland winners' medals, five Munster winners' medals, one National Hurling League winners' medal, two Fitzgibbon Cup medals, one Railway cup medal, two Munster Under-21 Hurling Championship medals, two Munster Minor Hurling Championship medals and two All-Star awards. He has ended up as an All-Ireland runner-up on two occasions.

At club level O'Mahony plays with the Newport club.

== Playing career ==
=== Club ===
O’Mahony plays his club hurling with Newport and has enjoyed some success.

In 2002 he was still a minor hurler when he played a key role for Newport. A defeat of Kildangan in the championship decider gave O'Mahony a county intermediate championship medal.

=== University ===
O'Mahony also enjoyed much success with the Limerick Institute of Technology (LIT) in the universities and colleges series of games. In 2005 he was corner back on the LIT team that defeated near neighbours University of Limerick in the final.

In 2007 he was centre back when won a second Fitzgibbon Cup medal as the National University of Ireland, Galway were defeated by 2–15 to 0–13 in the final.

=== Minor and under-21 ===
O'Mahony first came to prominence on the inter-county scene at midfield on the Tipperary minor hurling team in 2001. He won a Munster medal that year following a 1–13 to 1–6 defeat of Cork.

Tipperary made it two in-a-row in 2002 with O'Mahony collecting a second Munster medal following another defeat of Cork. He later lined out in the All-Ireland decider, however, Kilkenny powered to a 3–15 to 1–7 victory on that occasion.

O'Mahony subsequently joined the Tipperary under-21 team in 2003. He won a Munster medal in this grade in his debut season following a thrilling 2–14 to 0–17 defeat of Cork after a period of extra-time.

Tipperary retained their provincial crown in 2004. A 1–16 to 1–13 defeat of Cork gave O'Mahony a second successive Munster medal. Tipperary were later heavily defeated by Kilkenny in the All-Ireland final.

=== Senior ===
O'Mahony made his senior competitive debut for Tipperary in a National Hurling League game against Antrim in 2005. Later that season he made his championship debut against Limerick.

He became the first-choice centre-back the following year, however, Tipperary lost a second successive Munster final to Cork.

In 2008 Tipp remained undefeated in the National League before meeting Galway in the final. In an exciting game Tipp emerged victorious by 3–18 to 3–16 and O'Mahony collected his first National League winners' medal. Tipperary later reached the Munster final where they defeated a resurgent Clare team by 2–21 to 0–19. It was O'Mahony's first Munster winners' medal. Tipperary were subsequently defeated in a tense All-Ireland semi-final by Waterford on a scoreline of 1–20 to 1–18. In spite of falling short O'Mahony was later presented with his first All-Star award.

O'Mahony won his second Munster medal in 2009 as Tipp defeated Waterford by 4–14 to 2–16. After a six-week lay-off and a facile semi-final win over Limerick, Tipp qualified for an All-Ireland final meeting with Kilkenny. For much of the match it looked as if Tipp would pull off a shock and deny 'the Cats' a record-equaling four-in-a-row. Two quick goals in the space of a minute, one from a penalty by Henry Shefflin, sealed a 2–22 to 0–23 victory and defeat for Tipperary. O'Mahony later collected a second All-Star award.

After surrendering their Munster title to Cork at the first hurdle in 2010, Tipperary regrouped in the qualifiers and reached a second successive All-Ireland decider. Kilkenny, a team chasing a fifth successive championship, provided the opposition and a great game was expected. Tipperary got off to a great start which was bolstered by an early Lar Corbett goal. He subsequently completed a hat-trick of goals and Tipperary had a fourth by Noel McGrath to deny Kilkenny's drive-for-five and secure a remarkable and convincing 4–17 to 1–18 victory. It was O';Mahony's first All-Ireland medal in any grade.

Tipperary returned as provincial kingpins once again in 2011. A 7–19 to 0–19 trouncing of Waterford in the southern decider gave O'Mahony a third Munster medal. For the third successive year, Tipperary faced off against Kilkenny in the All-Ireland final, however, on this occasion Kilkenny were slight underdogs going up against the new champions. Kilkenny started quickly and never surrendered the lead in the 2–17 to 1–16 victory.

In spite of an indifferent National League campaign, Tipperary were regarded as potential All-Ireland champions once again. A 2–17 to 0–16 defeat of Waterford in the provincial decider gave O'Mahony a fourth Munster medal in five seasons. Tipperary later faced a humiliating 4–24 to 1–15 defeat by eventual champions Kilkenny in the All-Ireland semi-final.

O'Mahony retired from inter-county hurling in November 2015.

=== Inter-provincial ===
O'Mahony has also lined out with Munster in the Inter-provincial Championship. He won his sole Railway Cup medal as a non-playing substitute in 2007 as Munster defeated Connacht.

== Honours ==
=== Team ===
Newport

- Tipperary Intermediate Hurling Championship (2): 2002, 2016
- North Tipperary Intermediate Hurling Championship (3): 2009, 2014, 2015

Limerick Institute of Technology

- Fitzgibbon Cup (2): 2005, 2007

Tipperary

- All-Ireland Senior Hurling Championship (1): 2010
- Munster Senior Hurling Championship (5): 2008, 2009, 2011, 2012, 2015
- National Hurling League (1): 2008
- Munster Under-21 Hurling Championship (2): 2003, 2004
- Munster Minor Hurling Championship (2): 2001, 2002

Individual

- GAA GPA All Stars Awards (2): 2008, 2009

Munster

- Railway Cup (1): 2007
