= John McKenna (hurler) =

Irish hurler (1938–2025)

Personal information
- Native name: Seán Mac Cionaoith (Irish)
- Nickname: Mackey
- Born: April 1938 Borrisokane, County Tipperary, Ireland
- Died: 23 October 2025 (aged 87) Dooradoyle, Limerick, Ireland
- Occupation: Rate collector
- Height: 5 ft 9 in (175 cm)

Sport
- Sport: Hurling
- Position: Full-forward
Clubs
- Years: Club
- Borrisokane; Burgess
Club titles
- Tipperary titles: 0
Inter-county
Years	County	Apps (scores)
1961–1971	Tipperary	22 (8-15)
Inter-county titles
- Munster titles: 6
- All-Irelands: 4
- NHL: 4

John "Mackey" McKenna (May 1938 – 23 October 2025) was an Irish hurler. At club level, he played for Borrisokane and Burgess and at inter-county level with the Tipperary senior hurling team.

== Career ==
McKenna began his hurling career at club level with Borrisokane. He was part of the club's North Tipperary IHC-winning team in 1958, before winning a second medal in that competition in 1973. McKenna later transferred to the Burgess club and claimed a third North Tipperary IHC title in 1976. He also won a Tipperary JHC medal that year.

At inter-county level, McKenna first appeared for Tipperary during a two-year stint with the junior team in 1958 and 1959. He joined the senior team as a forward in 1961. McKenna won four All-Ireland SHC medals in the five-year period between 1961 and 1965. Tipperary's dominance of the era also saw him win six Munster SHC medals and four National Hurling League titles. McKenna's inter-county career ended in 1971.

McKenna's performances at inter-county level earned him a place on the Munster inter-provincial team. He won his sole Railway Cup medal in 1966, following Munster's defeat of Leinster in the final.

== Death ==
McKenna died at University Hospital Limerick on 23 October 2025, at the age of 87.

== Honours ==
Borrisokane

- North Tipperary Intermediate Hurling Championship: 1958, 1973

Burgess

- North Tipperary Intermediate Hurling Championship: 1976
- Tipperary Junior Hurling Championship: 1976

Tipperary

- All-Ireland Senior Hurling Championship: 1961, 1962, 1964, 1965
- Munster Senior Hurling Championship: 1961, 1962, 1964, 1965, 1967, 1968
- National Hurling League: 1960–61, 1963–64, 1964–65, 1967-68

Munster

- Railway Cup: 1966
