= Séamus Shinnors =

Irish hurler

Personal information
- Native name: Séamus Sionúir (Irish)
- Born: 1945 (age 80–81) Newport, County Tipperary, Ireland
- Occupation: Sales executive
- Height: 5 ft 11 in (180 cm)

Sport
- Sport: Hurling
- Position: Goalkeeper
Clubs
- Years: Club
- Ballinasloe; Newport
Club titles
- Tipperary titles: 0
Inter-county*
Years	County	Apps (scores)
1966-1977 1978-1980	Tipperary; Galway	4 (0-00); 3 (0-00)
Inter-county titles
- Munster titles: 0
- All-Irelands: 0
- NHL: 0
- All Stars: 0
- *Inter County team apps and scores correct as of 22:55, 30 January 2014.

'James N. Shinnorss (born 1945) is a retired Irish sportsperson. He played hurling with his local club Newport and with the Tipperary and Galway senior inter-county teams in the 1970s.

== Early life ==
Séamus Shinnors was born in Newport, County Tipperary in 1945. He was educated at the local national school and later attended Limerick CBS. Here his hurling skills first came to prominence. Shinnors won a Harty Cup medal with the school in 1964.

== Playing career ==
=== Club ===
Shinnors played his club hurling with his local club in Newport, however, he never won a senior county title. After moving to County Galway he later played hurling with Ballinasloe.

=== Inter-county ===
Shinnors first came to prominence on the inter-county scene with the Tipperary under-21 hurling team in the 1960s. He was a substitute goalkeeper on the team in the inaugural year of the competition in 1964, however, by 1965 Shinnors was the first choice net minder. He won a Munster title in that grade that year before later lining out in the All-Ireland final. Wexford provided the opposition on that occasion and triumphed by 3-7 to 1-4. Tipp lost their under-21 provincial title in 1966.

Shortly afterwards Shinnors joined the Tipperary senior hurling team. He was the sub goalkeeper to John O’Donoghue in 1967 and 1968 as Tipp reached the All-Ireland final in both years. They lost both games to Kilkenny and Wexford respectively; however, in 1970 O’Donoghue retired from inter-county hurling. It looked likely that Shinnors would now become the number one goalkeeper on the team, however, before the start of the 1971 championship he was unceremoniously cut from the panel of players.

In 1974 Shinnors was back with the Tipp senior team and he was finally installed as the first choice goalkeeper. He remained between the posts until 1976, however, during those three seasons Tipperary failed to win a single championship game. After the final defeat in 1976 Shinnors retired from the Tipp panel.

To many it seemed as if Shinnors’s playing days were over. Two years later in 1978, however, he was drafted onto the Galway senior panel by his old under-21 teammate Michael ‘Babs’ Keating. He trained in secret until May 1979. Shinnors’s first outing with Galway was an All-Ireland quarter-final meeting with Laois. While Galway were expected to win the game easily they struggled in patches but still won by 1-23 to 3-10. The subsequent All-Ireland semi-final saw Cork providing the opposition. Cork had been the reigning champions for the previous three years and were two games away from capturing a record-equaling four in-a-row. In an exciting game Shinnors made some excellent saves and contributed to Galway’s 2-14 to 1-13 victory over one of the greatest teams of all-time. The subsequent championship decider saw Galway take on Kilkenny. In one of the worst All-Ireland finals of recent decades Shinnors had an absolute nightmare of a game. A ’70 by Liam 'Chunky' O’Brien after just four minutes dipped, hit off Shinnors and ended up in the Galway net. Galway fought back and went two points up twelve minutes into the second half, however. They failed to score for the rest of the game. Four minutes before the end of the game another long-range free for Kilkenny ended up in the net behind Shinnors. It was a score which summed up the day as Kilkenny went on to win by 2-12 to 1-8.

This defeat shook Shinnors’s confidence; however, he remained on the panel for the National Hurling League in late 1979 and early 1980. He assumed that he would be lining out in the championship, however, a few weeks before Galway’s first outing Shinnors receive a letter explaining that he had been dropped from the panel. It was the end of his inter-county career. Even more heartbreaking for Shinnors was that Galway went on to win the All-Ireland that year, their first title in fifty-seven years.

=== Provincial ===
Shinnors also lined out with Connacht in the inter-provincial hurling competition. He won his sole Railway Cup medal in 1980 as Connacht defeat Munster. It was Connacht’s second Railway Cup title and their first in thirty-three years.
