= Jimmy Coffey =

Irish hurler

Jimmy "Butler" Coffey
Personal information
- Native name: Séamus Ó Cofaigh (Irish)
- Nickname: Butler
- Born: 26 October 1909 Newport, County Tipperary, Ireland
- Died: 29 December 2010 (aged 101) Newport, County Tipperary, Ireland
- Occupation: Lorry driver

Sport
- Sport: Hurling
- Position: Right wing-forward
Clubs
- Years: Club
- Newport; Young Irelands; Cappamore; Ahane
Club titles
- Limerick titles: 2
Inter-county*
| Years | County | Apps (scores) |
| 1932–1940 | Tipperary | 9 (8-08) |
Inter-county titles
- Munster titles: 1
- All-Irelands: 1
- NHL: 0
- *Inter County team apps and scores correct as of 18:35, 1 June 2015.

Jimmy "Butler" Coffey (26 October 1909 – 29 December 2010) was an Irish hurler who played as a right wing-forward for the Tipperary senior team.

Born in Newport, County Tipperary, Coffey first arrived on the inter-county scene at the age of nineteen when he first linked up with the Tipperary senior team. He made his senior debut during a tournament game in 1932. Coffey subsequently became a regular member of the starting fifteen and won one All-Ireland medal and one Munster medal.

As a member of the Munster inter-provincial team on a number of occasions, Coffey won one Railway Cup medal. At club level he began his career with Newport before later lining out with Young Irelands and Cappamore. Coffey was a two-time championship medallist with Ahane.

Throughout his career, Coffey made a brief number of championship appearances. His retirement came following the conclusion of the 1939-40 league.

In retirement from playing Coffey became involved in team management and coaching. At club level he trained Cappamore to junior and senior successes before becoming a selector with the Limerick senior team.

== Playing career ==
=== Club ===
Coffey began his club hurling career with Newport as a member of the minor team in 1926. He won a North Tipperary championship medal in that grade that year as Kildangan were accounted for in the decider. Coffey went on to win two North Tipperary senior championship medals in 1932 and 1935, together with one intermediate championship in 1934.

In 1940 Coffey crossed the border to Limerick and lined out with Young Irelands before later linking up with Cappamore after moving to the village in 1945.

Because he was playing with a junior club in the division, Coffey was entitled to be added to the Ahane senior team in 1947. Ahane were bidding to win a seventh successive championship as they faced St. Patrick's in the decider. A 5-6 to 1-5 victory gave Coffey a Limerick Senior Hurling Championship medal.

Coffey was retained on the Ahane team for 1948 as the club reached the decider once again. A 2-3 to 0-1 defeat of Croom gave him a second successive championship medal.

=== Inter-county ===
Coffey first played for Tipperary as a member of the minor hurling team in 1928. It was the beginning of three successive seasons with the team, however, success eluded him for the first two years. A 4-3 to 3-0 defeat of Cork secured a Munster medal for Coffey. On 28 September 1930 Tipperary faced Kilkenny in the All-Ireland decider at Croke Park. A 4-1 to 2-1 victory secured an All-Ireland Minor Hurling Championship medal for Coffey.

After making his senior debut in a tournament game in 1932, Coffey made his championship debut on 21 May 1933 in a 3-3 apiece Munster semi-final draw with Waterford.

In 1937 Tipperary made the breakthrough after much of the decade spent in the hurling wilderness. A 6-3 to 4-3 defeat of five-in-a-row hopefuls Limerick secured a Munster medal for Coffey. Kilkenny were the opponents in the subsequent All-Ireland decider on 5 September 1937, however, a builders' strike at Croke Park resulted in the game taking place at Fitzgerald Stadium in Killarney. Newcomer Tommy Doyle pointed for Tipperary virtually from the throw-in. Kilkenny, who had dominated the early part of the decade and were appearing in their sixth final in seven years, had somewhat of a veteran team that failed to match Tipperary's speed. The Cats managed only a brace of points as Tipp notched up 2-8 courtesy of goals by Dinny Murphy and Coffey. Kilkenny introduced their veteran star, Lory Meagher, at the interval and he scored Kilkenny's solitary point of the second half. Tipperary responded with another goal from Dinny Murphy, as they ran out easy winners by 3-11 to 0-3, resulting in an All-Ireland medal for Coffey.

Coffey was a regular starter during the 1939-40 league campaign, however, he decided to retire from the inter-county scene before the championship commenced.

=== Inter-provincial ===
In 1938 Coffey was included at right corner-back on the Munster inter-provincial team. A 6-2 to 4-3 defeat of arch rivals Leinster in the decider secured a Railway Cup medal.

== Coaching career ==
=== Cappamore ===
Shortly after his retirement from club hurling, Coffey was appointed trainer of the Cappamore junior team. In 1952 he guided the team to the championship title following a defeat of Castletown.

After making the jump to the senior grade, Cappamore qualified for the decider in 1954. A 2-11 to 3-5 defeat of Western Gaels secured Cappamore's first title in half a century.

=== Limerick ===
In 1955 Coffey was added as a selector to a Mick Mackey-trained Limerick senior team. That year Limerick qualified for a provincial showdown with Clare. In spite of being underdogs Coffey's side defeated Clare by 2-15 to 2-6.

== Personal life ==
Born in Chapel Lane, Newport, County Tipperary, Coffey was the second youngest in a family of eight; four boys and four girls. He was educated at the local national school before later finding employment as a lorry driver with O'Byrnes Mineral Waters in Limerick.

On 4 April 1945 Coffey married Eileen O'Connell from Cappamore and the couple had three sons; Éamon, Patsy and Thomas.

Coffey died on 29 December 2010 at the age of 101. He was predeceased by his son Thomas in 1983 and his wife Eileen in 1996.

== Honours ==
=== Player ===
Newport

- North Tipperary Senior Hurling Championship (2): 1932, 1935
- North Tipperary Intermediate Hurling Championship (1): 1934
- North Tipperary Minor Hurling Championship (1): 1926

Ahane

- Limerick Senior Hurling Championship (2): 1947, 1948

Tipperary

- All-Ireland Senior Hurling Championship (1): 1937
- Munster Senior Hurling Championship (1): 1937

Munster

- Railway Cup (1): 1938

=== Trainer/selector ===
Cappamore

- Limerick Senior Hurling Championship (1): 1954
- Limerick Junior Hurling Championship (1): 1952

Limerick

- Munster Senior Hurling Championship (1): 1955
