= North Tipperary Intermediate Hurling Championship =

- Code: Hurling
- Founded: 1927; 99 years ago
- Region: North Tipperary (GAA)
- Title holders: Portroe (5th title)
- Most titles: 14 (Burgess)
- Sponsors: Savvy kitchens
- Official website: Official website

The North Tipperary Intermediate Hurling Championship is an annual inter-divisional adult hurling tournament organised by the Tipperary County Board of the Gaelic Athletic Association that has taken place in North Tipperary since 1927. The series of games take place during the months of March, May and April.

The championship has always been played using a knock-out format. The winners and runners-up of the North Tipperary Championship joined their counterparts from the other three divisions to contest the Tipperary Intermediate Hurling Championship quarter-finals.

There are currently 4 teams competing for this title. The title has been won by a total of 18 different clubs during its existence. The all time record holders are Burgess who have won a total of 14 titles.

The current holders of the title are Portroe, who won the title after defeating Newport on a score of 0-24 to 1-16 in the 2026 championship final.

== Roll of Honour ==
#	Team	No. Of Titles	Winning Years	Runners-up	Years Runners-up
1	Burgess	14	1941, 1951, 1953, 1956, 1959, 1963,1964, 1969, 1970, 1976,1992, 1993, 2003, 2005	0	
2	Silvermines	11	1945, 1948, 1972, 1987, 1994, 1997, 1998, 1999, 2006, 2011, 2012	6	1995, 1991, 1990, 1969,1958, 1952
3	Shannon Rovers	10	1939, 1954, 1967, 1968, 1974, 1975, 1985, 1986, 2010, 2025	9	2022, 2013, 1994,1971, 1966, 1964, 1963, 1953, 1947
=4	Newport	8	1934, 1957, 1965, 1988, 1989, 2009, 2014, 2015	9	2026, 2016, 2011, 2008, 2002, 2000,1987, 1986, 1954
=4	Borrisokane	8	1940, 1952, 1958, 1973, 1982, 1995, 1996, 2018	9	2025, 2023, 2021, 2010, 2006, 2004,1974,1957, 1950
=4	Kiladangan	8	1930, 1966, 1971, 1977, 1980, 2001, 2002, 2004	5	2019, 1992, 1976, 1970,1968
=4	Moneygall	8	1943, 1949, 1962, 1991, 2019, 2021, 2023, 2024	4	2017, 1948, 1945, 1940
8	Portroe	5	1950, 1981, 1983, 1990, 2026	8	2024, 1989, 1985, 1984, 1982, 1979, 1960, 1949
9	Templederry Kenyons	4	1931, 1979, 2000, 2008	7	1999, 1996,1993, 1988, 1983, 1978, 1930
10	Toomevara	3	1944, 1955, 1984	4	1998, 1981, 1967, 1941
11	Lorrha	3	1946, 2007, 2022	2	1951, 1944
12	Ballinahinch	2	2016, 2017	5	2018, 2015, 2014, 1977, 1975
13	Knockshegowna	2	1960, 1961	2	1997, 1965
14	Nenagh (St. Mary's in 1947)	2	1929, 1947	1	1929
15	Dolla	2	1927, 1928	0	
16	Ballina	1	2013	7	2012, 2009, 2007, 2005, 1973, 1972, 1943
17	Kilruane	1	1978	5	2003, 2001,1980, 1962, 1934
18	Youghalarra	1	1942	2	1955, 1939
19	Roscrea	0		2	1959, 1931
19	Eire Og	0		2	1946, 1942
21	Rearcross	0		1	1961
21	Ballyskenach	0		1	1956
21	Borris-Ileigh	0		1	1929
21	Ballymackey	0		1	1928

== Final results ==
The results of the finals from the years 1927-1999 were found in the book 'A History of the GAA in the North Tipperary Division'. The results can also be seen on the North Tipperary Gaa Website

Year	Winner	Runner-up
2026	Portroe 0-24	Newport 1-16
2025	Shannon Rovers 3-15	Borrisokane 1-16
2024	Moneygall 2-21	Portroe 0-11
2023	Moneygall 3-15	Borrisokane 0-11
2022	Lorrha 2-24	Shannon Rovers 3-11
2021	Moneygall 4-19	Borrisokane 3-17
2020	**** NO COMPETITION DUE TO COVID ****	
2019	Moneygall 2-14	Kiladangan 0-13
2018	Borrisokane 4-15	Ballinahinch 1-15
2017	Ballinahinch 0-21	Moneygall 1-14
2016	Ballinahinch 2-14	Newport 0-19
2015 (Replay)	Newport 1-17	Ballinahinch 1-14
2015 (Draw)	Newport 0-17	Ballinahinch 1-14
2014	Newport 1-21	Ballinahinch 1-07
2013	Ballina 1-20	Shannon Rovers 1-11
2012	Silvermines 1-12	Ballina 0-10
2011	Silvermines 2-19	Newport 0-09
2010	Shannon Rovers2-14	Borrisokane 2-12
2009	Newport 1-13	Ballina 0-12
2008	Templederry 0-17	Newport 1-10
2007	Lorrha 3-09	Ballina 1-13
2006	Silvermines 2-15	Borrisokane 1-13
2005	Burgess1-23	Ballina 2-08
2004	Kiladangan2-13	Borrisokane 2-11
2003 (Replay)	Burgess 1-10	Kilruane 0-07
2003 (Draw)	Burgess 0-15	Kilruane 2-09
2002 (Replay)	Kiladangan 2-13	Newport 0-02
2002 (Draw)	Kiladangan 0-10	Newport 1-07
2001	Kiladangan 1-12	Kilruane 0-13
2000 (Replay)	Templederry 4-14	Newport 3-12
2000 (Draw)	Templederry 0-16	Newport 2-10
1999	Silvermines 0-15	Templederry 0-09
1998	Silvermines 4-11	Toomevara 3-08
1997	Silvermines 1-12	Knockshegowna 2-03
1996	Borrisokane 1-11	Templederry 0-10
1995 (Replay)	Borrisokane 5-16	Silvermines 0-10
1995 (Draw)	Borrisokane 1-15	Silvermines 0-18
1994	Silvermines 0-18	Shannon Rovers 1-09
1993	Burgess 3-12	Templederry 1-09
1992	Burgess 1-16	Kiladangan 3-06
1991 (Replay)	Moneygall 2-11	Silvermines 3-06
1991 (Draw)	Moneygall 2-10	Silvermines 2-10
1990	Portroe 3-08	Silvermines 2-09
1989	Newport 2-14	Portroe 1-12
1988	Newport 2-09	Templederry 1-08
1987	Silvermines 3-11	Newport 0-10
1986	Shannon Rovers 1-12	Newport 0-07
1985	Shannon Rovers 3-09	Portroe 1-07
1984	Toomevara 0-13	Portroe 0-12
1983	Portroe 2-08	Templederry 2-06
1982	Borrisokane 2-10	Portroe 1-04
1981	Portroe 2-10	Toomevara 0-15
1980	Kiladangan 3-09	Kilruane 0-09
1979	Templederry 2-11	Portroe 1-10
1978 (Replay)	Kilruane 3-03	Templederry 0-11
1978 (Draw)	Kilruane 2-09	Templederry 3-06
1977 (Replay)	Kiladangan 2-12	Ballinahinch 1-06
1977 (Draw)	Kiladangan 1-04	Ballinahinch 1-04
1976 (Replay)	Burgess 2-04	Kiladangan 1-06
1976 (Draw)	Burgess 1-08	Kiladangan0-11
1975	Shannon Rovers 3-07	Ballinahinch 1-06
1974	Shannon Rovers 2-04	Borrisokane 0-03
1973	Borrisokane 3-11	Ballina 3-05
1972	Silvermines 6-10	Ballina 3-05
1971	Kiladangan 5-09	Shannon Rovers 2-03
1970	Burgess 4-11	Kiladangan 3-04
1969	Burgess 5-06	Silvermines 4-6
1968 (Replay)	Shannon Rovers 5-06	Kiladangan 0-06
1968 (Draw)	Shannon Rovers 6-03	Kiladangan 3-12
1967	Shannon Rovers 7-07	Toomevara 2-04
1966 (Replay)	Kiladangan 4-08	Shannon Rovers 2-01
1966 (Draw)	Kiladangan 1-05	Shannon Rovers 2-02
1965	Newport 2-05	Knockshegowna 2-03
1964	Burgess 7-06	Shannon Rovers 3-05
1963	Burgess 6-03	Shannon Rovers 3-06
1962	Moneygall 2-06	Kilruane 1-08
1961	Knockshegowna 11-05	Rearcross 0-05
1960	Knockshegowna 6-03	Portroe 3-07
1959	Burgess 8-05	Roscrea 2-00
1958	Borrisokane 3-06	Silvermines 2-05
1957	Newport 8-09	Borrisokane 1-05
1956	Burgess 4-13	Ballyskenach 4-01
1955	Toomevara 4-06	Youghalarra 1-04
1954	Newport 2-02	Shannon Rovers 1-03
1953 (2nd Replay)	Burgess 4-02	Shannon Rovers 1-04
1953 (Drawn Replay)	Burgess 2-04	Shannon Rovers 3-01
1953 (Draw)	Burgess 3-05	Shannon Rovers 3-05
1952	Borrisokane 1-06	Silvermines 2-00
1951	Burgess 4-05	Lorrha-Dorrha 2-04
1950	Portroe 6-05	Borrisokane 1-04
1949	Moneygall 4-02	Portroe 1-01
1948	Silvermines 2-03	Moneygall 2-02
1947	St. Mary's 5-06	Shannon Rovers 2-05
1946	Lorrha-Dorrha 5-06	Eire Og 3-05
1945	Silvermines 4-05	Moneygall 4-04
1944	Toomevara 4-04	Lorrha-Dorrha 1-05
1943	Moneygall 3-04	Ballina 3-00
1942	Youghalarra 5-03	Eire Og 2-01
1941	Burgess 4-04	Toomevara 3-03
1940	Borrisokane 3-03	Moneygall 2-02
1939	Shannon Rovers 4-03	Youghalarra 2-01
1935-1938	No Championship during this period	
1934	Newport 4-06	Kilruane 3-02
1932-1933	No Championship during this period	
1931	Templederry 4-02	Roscrea 2-01
1930	Kiladangan 5-00	Templederry 2-04
1929	Borris-Ileigh 4-05	Nenagh 1-01
1928	Dolla 3-01	Ballymackey 2-02
1927	Dolla win under league system	

KEY
Years when the losing team made an objection to the match result and consequently were awarded the game.
