= Newport GAA =

Gaelic games club in County Tipperary, Ireland

Newport
- An Port Nua
- Founded: 1886
- County: Tipperary
- Colours: Purple and Gold
- Grounds: Lacken Park
- Coordinates: 52°42′29.04″N 8°23′43.45″W

Playing kits
Standard colours

Newport GAA is a Tipperary GAA club which is located in County Tipperary, Ireland. Both hurling and Gaelic football are played in the North Tipperary divisional competitions. The club is centred on the town of Newport.

== Lacken Park ==
Named after Paddy Ryan Lacken, and known locally as "The Park". It has four changing rooms (Home on right). With a club house at the end with many Newport GAA memorabilia as well as a kitchen a Referee's room while a meeting room also in the building. There are three pitches, a main pitch with a stand and great floodlight facilities. Separating the two Juvenile pitches and the main pitch is a hurling wall. The Juvenile pitch is very well designed with "The Hill" behind the far goal where the younger supporters watch on from. The Juvenile pitch is also floodlit, while the even younger teams (U8-10) play in a junior pitch with smaller goals and a shorter pitch. The U8-10s train in the GYM in the winter beside St. Mary's Secondary School. While the rest train in the Ball Alleys beside Newport College (Vocational School) in Newport, while the pitch is unplayable.

== Achievements ==
=== Adult Titles ===
==== Hurling ====
- North Tipperary Senior Hurling Championship (3) 1932, 1935, 1996
- Tipperary Intermediate Hurling Championship (3) 1989, 2002, 2016
- North Tipperary Intermediate Hurling Championship (8) 1934, 1957, 1965, 1988, 1989, 2009, 2014, 2015
- Tipperary Junior A Hurling Championship (1) 1957
- North Tipperary Junior A Hurling Championship (1) 1924
- Tipperary Junior B Hurling Championship (1) 2026
- North Tipperary Junior B Hurling Championship (5) 1983, 1988, 2011, 2015, 2017

==== Football ====
- North Tipperary Senior Football Championship (4) 1986, 1987, 1988, 1990
- North Tipperary Intermediate Football Championship (9) 1979, 1985, 1993, 1995, 2001, 2002, 2005, 2006, 2009
- Tipperary Junior A Football Championship (2) 1965, 1970
- North Tipperary Junior A Football Championship (6) 1967, 1970, 1976, 1978, 1979, 2015
- North Tipperary Junior B Football Championship (1) 1996

=== Juvenile Titles ===
==== Hurling ====
- Tipperary Under-21 B Hurling Championship (1) 2003
- North Tipperary Under-21 B Hurling Championship (4) 2003, 2004, 2014, 2018
- Tipperary Under-21 C Hurling Championship (1) 2001
- Tipperary Minor A Hurling Championship (1) 2026
- North Tipperary Minor A Hurling Championship (4) 1924, 2014, 2025, 2026
- Tipperary Minor B Hurling Championship (1) 2023
- North Tipperary Minor B Hurling Championship (2) 1994, 2023

==== Football ====
- North Tipperary Under-21 A Football Championship (7) 1985, 1986, 1996, 1997, 2005, 2010, 2015
- North Tipperary Under-21 B Football Championship (2) 1990, 2008, 2018
- Tipperary Minor A Football Championship (2) 1995, 2001
- North Tipperary Minor A Football Championship (6) 1995, 2001, 2002, 2013, 2015, 2026
- North Tipperary Minor B Football Championship (1) 1988

== Notable players ==
- Conor O'Mahony: All-Ireland SHC-winner (2010), All Star-winner (2008, 2009)
- Sean O’Brien: All-Ireland SHC-winner (2019)
- Noel O'Gorman: All-Ireland SHC-winner (1965)
- Jimmy Coffey: All-Ireland SHC-winner (1937)
- Dan Troy: All-Ireland SHC-winner (1918)
- Séamus Shinnors

== Other noted figures ==
- Tim Floyd
