= Knockshegowna GAA =

Gaelic games club in County Tipperary, Ireland

- Colours: Blue and Gold

Playing kits
Standard colours

Knockshegowna GAA is a Gaelic Athletic Association club in Ballingarry, County Tipperary, Ireland. The club's name comes from the townland of Knockshegowna to the east of Ballingarry. The club is part of the North Tipperary GAA division. The club has been North Tipperary Junior Hurling Champions on nine occasions.

== Achievements ==
- Tipperary Junior A Hurling Championship Winners (3)1969, 1993, 2006
- North Tipperary Intermediate Hurling Championship Winners (2)1960, 1961
- North Tipperary Junior Hurling Championship Winners (11) 1934, 1957, 1969, 1972, 1974, 1988, 1989, 1993, 2006, 2013, 2015
- Munster Junior Club Hurling Championship Runners-Up 2005, 2006
- North Tipperary Junior B Football Championship Winners (2) 2003, 2007
- Tipperary Under-21 A Hurling Championship Winners (1) 1966 (with Lorrha)
- North Tipperary Under-21 A Hurling Championship Winners (2) 1965 (with Lorrha), 1966 (with Lorrha)
