= Tipperary Intermediate Hurling Championship =

Annual hurling competition

- Irish: Craobh Iomána Idirmhéanach Thiobraid Árainn
- Founded: 1979
- Title holders: Arravale Rovers (2nd title)
- Most titles: Silvermines, Newport & Moyne-Templetuohy (3 titles)

The Tipperary Intermediate Hurling Championship is an annual hurling competition organised by the Tipperary County Board of the Gaelic Athletic Association since 1979 for the third-tier hurling teams in the county of Tipperary in Ireland.

The series of games are played during the summer and autumn months with the county final currently being played at Semple Stadium in October. The championship has always been played on a regional basis, whereby the respective champions from the Mid, North, South and West championships contest the county series of games. However, in recent years, the championship has followed the same system as the senior grade in Tipperary. Currently (2018) there are 21 teams in the county championship divided up into 6 groups (3 groups with 4 teams, 3 groups with 3 teams). The top 2 teams of each group qualify for the knock out phase of the championship along with the 4 divisional winners. It is quite common for clubs to progress from their group and also win their respective divisional championship.

The Tipperary County Championship is an integral part of the wider Munster GAA Intermediate Club Hurling Championship. The winners of the Tipperary county final join the champions of the other hurling counties to contest the provincial championship.

The title has been won at least once by 32 clubs.

Arravale Rovers are the current (2026) titleholders, having beating Ballingarry in the final, on a score line of 3-19 to 2-21.

== Roll of Honour ==
#	Team	Winner	Second	Finals won	Finals lost
1	Moyne-Templetuohy	3	4	2021, 2014, 1983	2013, 2004, 2001, 2020
1	Newport	3	2	2016, 2002, 1989	2008, 2000
1	Silvermines	3	2	2012, 1999, 1972	1994, 1987
2	Gortnahoe-Glengoole	2	3	2020, 1988	2017, 2011, 2010
2	Arravale Rovers	2	3	2026, 1997	2009, 1991, 1988
2	Burgess	2	2	2005, 1993	2003, 1992
2	Golden-Kilfeacle	2	2	2025, 1995	2023, 1982
2	Templederry Kenyons	2	1	2008, 2000	1999
2	Moneygall	2	1	2024, 1991	2022
2	Boherlahan-Dualla	2	0	2023, 1981	
2	Borrisokane	2	0	2010, 1982	
2	Éire Óg Annacarty	2	0	2006, 1994	
2	Lorrha-Dorrha	2	0	2022, 2007	
3	Thurles Sarsfields	1	4	2018	2016, 2015, 2014, 1989
3	Kildangan	1	3	2004	2019, 2002, 1980
3	Clonmore	1	3	1987	1986, 1984, 1979
3	Moycarkey-Borris	1	3	1985	2007, 2006, 2005
3	Portroe	1	2	1990	1983, 1981
3	Ballingarry	1	2	1979	2026, 2024
3	Ballina	1	1	2013	2012
3	Upperchurch-Drombane	1	1	1998	1993
3	Knockavilla-Donaskeigh Kickhams	1	1	1992	2025
3	Seán Treacy's	1	0	2019	
3	St Mary's Clonmel	1	0	2017	
3	Clonakenny	1	0	2015	
3	Aherlow	1	0	2011	
3	Carrick Davins	1	0	2009	
3	Kilruane MacDonaghs	1	0	2003	
3	Galtee Rovers	1	0	2001	
3	Lattin-Cullen	1	0	1996	
3	Shannon Rovers	1	0	1986	
3	Toomevara	1	0	1984	
3	Loughmore-Castleiney	1	0	1980	
4	JK Brackens	0	2		1997, 1996
5	Kilsheelan-Kilcash	0	1		2021
5	Cashel King Cormacs	0	1		2018
5	Ballybacon-Grange	0	1		1998
5	Cahir	0	1		1995
5	Mullinahone	0	1		1990
5	Killenaule	0	1		1985

== Finals ==
Year	Winner	Score	Opponent	Score
2026	Arravale Rovers	1-34 (a.e.t.)	Ballingarry	3-27
2025	Golden-Kilfeacle	3-19	Knockavilla-Donaskeigh Kickhams	2-21
2024	Moneygall	2-21	Ballingarry	4-14
2023	Boherlahan-Dualla	3-15	Golden-Kilfeacle	0-15
2022	Lorrha-Dorrha	4-15	Moneygall	3-12
2021	Moyne-Templetuohy	2-18	Kilsheelan-Kilcash	1-20
2020	Gortnahoe-Glengoole	2-19	Moyne-Templetuohy	0-19
2019	Seán Treacy's	3-14	Kiladangan	2-12
2018	Thurles Sarsfields	1-16	Cashel King Cormacs	0-16
2017	St. Mary's Clonmel	2-19	Gortnahoe-Glengoole	0-11
2016	Newport	1-17	Thurles Sarsfields	0-15
2015	Clonakenny	2-13	Thurles Sarsfields	3-09
2014	Moyne-Templetuohy	1-18	Thurles Sarsfields	0-10
2013	Ballina	3-12	Moyne-Templetuohy	0-20
2012	Silvermines	2-21	Ballina	0-10
2011	Aherlow	1-11	Gortnahoe-Glengoole	0-10
2010	Borrisokane	2-13	Gortnahoe-Glengoole	1-12
2009	Carrick Davins	1-13	Arravale Rovers	1-06
2008	Templederry Kenyons	0-15	Newport	0-09
2007	Lorrha-Dorrha	1-11	Moycarkey-Borris	0-11
2006	Éire Óg Annacarty-Donohill	4-11	Moycarkey-Borris	0-09
2005	Burgess	1-10	Moycarkey-Borris	2-06
2004	Kiladangan	2-15	Moyne-Templetuohy	1-06
2003	Kilruane McDonagh's	2-17	Burgess	2-15
2002	Newport	1-14	Kiladangan	0-09
2001	Galtee Rovers	1-08	Moyne-Templetuohy	0-10
2000	Templederry Kenyons	1-09	Newport	0-11
1999	Silvermines	1-11	Templederry Kenyons	1-10
1998	Upperchurch-Drombane	1-11	Ballybacon-Grange	1-10
1997	Arravale Rovers	1-06	JK Bracken's	0-06
1996	Lattin-Cullen	0-13	JK Bracken's	1-08
1995	Golden-Kilfeacle	2-12	Cahir	0-04
1994	Éire Óg Annacarty-Donohill	0-09	Silvermines	1-05
1993	Burgess	0-11	Upperchurch-Drombane	0-07
1992	Knockavilla-Donaskeigh Kickhams	4-07	Burgess	0-10
1991	Moneygall	3-09	Arravale Rovers	2-06
1990	Portroe	2-12	Mullinahone	1-11
1989	Newport	0-14	Thurles Sarsfields	1-08
1988	Gortnahoe-Glengoole	2-08	Arravale Rovers	1-07
1987	Clonmore	2-10	Silvermines	1-11
1986	Shannon Rovers	0-09	Clonmore	0-08
1985	Moycarkey-Borris	2-07	Killenaule	1-06
1984	Toomevara	2-21	Clonmore	1-06
1983	Moyne-Templetuohy	4-10	Portroe	2-07
1982	Borrisokane	3-17	Golden-Kilfeacle	1-05
1981	Boherlahan-Dualla	5-10	Portroe	4-08
1980	Loughmore-Castleiney	2-14	Kiladangan	0-05
1979	Ballingarry	4-08	Clonmore	2-11
