= Newport, County Tipperary =

Newport Irish: An Port Nua
- Town
- Location in Ireland
- Coordinates: 52°42′36″N 8°24′25″W
- Country: Ireland
- Province: Munster
- County: County Tipperary

Population (2022)
  - Total: 2,183
- Time zone: UTC+0 (WET)
  - Summer (DST): UTC-1 (IST (WEST))
- Irish Grid Reference: R574572

Newport (Irish: An Port Nua), formerly Portnacask, is a town in County Tipperary in Ireland. It is in the barony of Owney and Arra. At the 2022 census, Newport's population was 2,183.

== Location ==
Newport is located approximately 8 km from Birdhill and 16 km from Limerick. The Newport River, a tributary of the Mulcair (or Mulkear) River and it flows through the middle of the town where it is joined by the Cully River. Newport is nestled in the foothills of Silvermine mountain range. The highest of these mountains is Keeper Hill a well-used local hiking and walking area. It is close to Lough Derg and the villages of Murroe, Killaloe and Ballina.

== History ==
The original settlement in Newport dates back centuries before the Norman invasions. After the Cromwellian conquest of Ireland, Richard Warren Waller acquired Cully Castle sometime in the 1650s. He was the son of Edward Waller and Margaret Glascoke. He was granted 1,195 acres (4.84 km^{2}) of land in the vicinity. After the war, the castle was in ruins and was rebuilt as Castle Waller. A townland still bears that name. He died in 1676. Vice-Admiral Robert Otway and Sir Arthur Otway, 3rd Baronet along with the other Waller baronets are direct descendants. During this time the settlement was changed from the Irish name Tulach Sheasta to the English Newport.

The town contains an old courthouse and a jail called the Bridewell, built in 1862–63 on land owned by Sir Edward Waller. The courthouse was used for the trial of minor offences; on occasion it was used for preliminary hearings for more serious crimes, before they were referred to a higher circuit court. The building contains eight cells, two day rooms and two limestone staircases. It remains today on Jail street and now houses the Peter Dee Academy of Music.

During the Irish War of Independence, Newport was the scene of various incidents, including the shaving of a woman's head for keeping company of policemen and the burning down of several business premises (Cullen's Shop and Daly's Public House) and houses (Clareview former Charter School). The RIC barracks moved from centre of the village to Clareview. On 15 May 1921, the Newport brigade planned an attack on District Inspector Harold Biggs. He was ambushed at Coolboreen returning from dinner at the Barrington family shooting lodge, Glenculloo Lodge, on the river in the foothills of Keeper Hill. He was shot and killed in the ambush together with Winifred Barrington, daughter of Sir Charles Barrington of what was then Glenstal Castle and now Glenstal Abbey. Among the members of the raiding party was Patrick Ryan (after whom the Newport GAA pitch is named). Also killed during the revolutionary period were Sgt John Walsh of the RIC and Patrick Gilligan, a former soldier, shot on 22 May 1922. This was after the treaty had been signed.

== Education ==
There are two primary schools (Convent of Mercy Primary School and the Boys' National School) in the town, and two secondary level schools (St Mary's Secondary School and Newport College). In 2018, St Mary's was ranked 148 out of 500 schools in the Irish Times poll of top secondary schools.

Only 8% of the population of Newport have either no formal education or are educated to primary level. This is much lower than county average (13.4%) and state average (12.5%). Additionally, a higher number of people complete their junior cert level (18%) and leaving certificate level (22%) when compared to county (17.7% & 21.2%) and state (14.5 & 18%).

== Transport ==
Newport is served by Bus Éireann who run a service three times a day to and from Limerick City. On Fridays Bus Éireann operates a bus from Newport to Nenagh via Silvermines. The nearest railway station Birdhill railway station is 8.5 km away in the neighbouring village of Birdhill. The main road through Newport is the R503 and the M7 lies 12 km to the west.

== Amenities ==
=== Churches ===
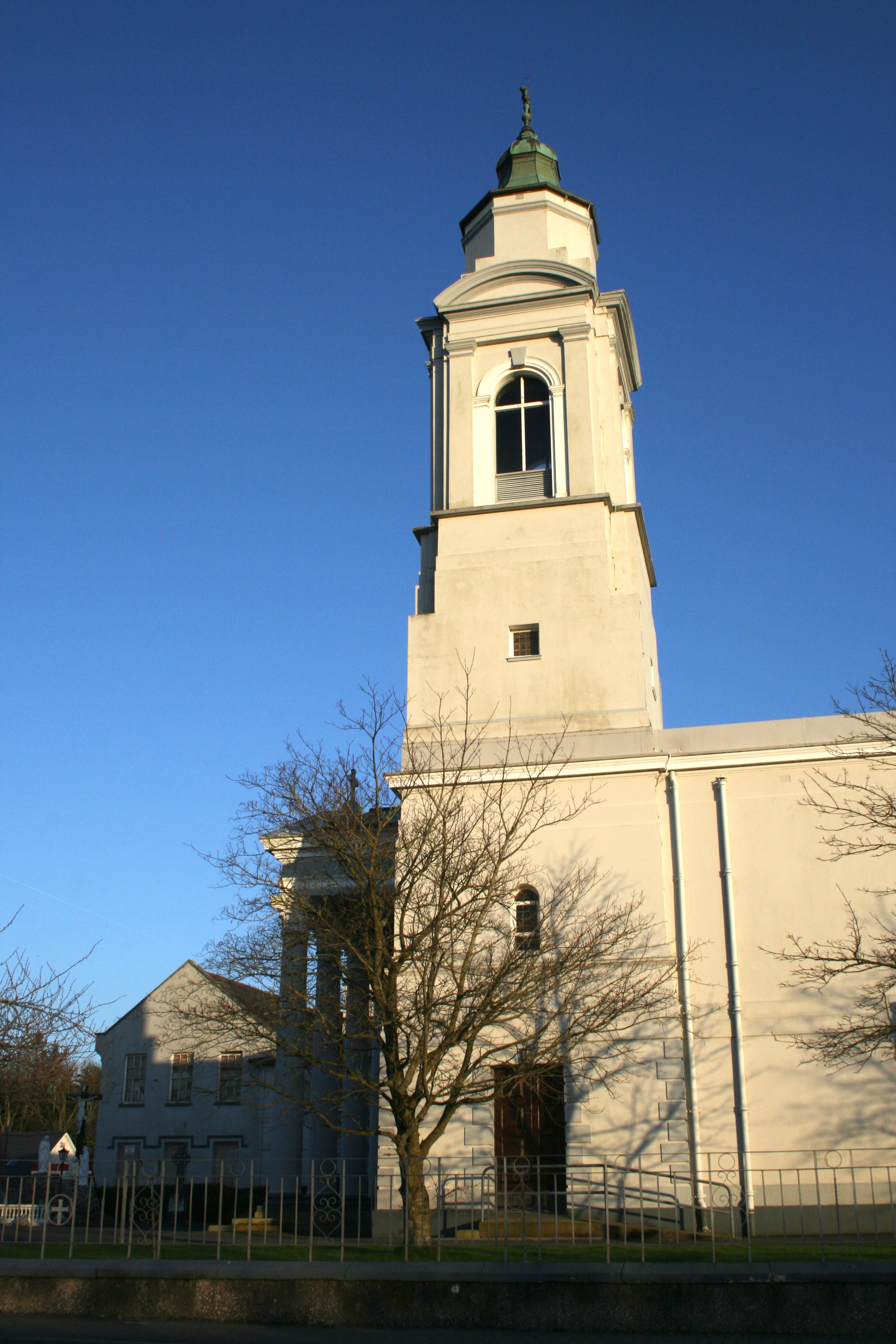
Newport's Catholic church is the Church of the Most Holy Redeemer

There were two churches in the town. The Church of Ireland church, the Church of St. John's, was built in 1766 and had been the major church in Newport until the building of a 'Mass house' at the end of the 18th century after the relaxing of the penal laws. The Catholic church, also called St John's, was located on Chapel Lane and built circa 1796. The last service in the Church of Ireland (Anglican) church was held in 1964 and the church was later demolished. The church graveyard remains. It is located on Church Road.

Today, there is only a Catholic church in the town. This church, the Church of the Most Holy Redeemer, was constructed in 1933 and is located on Church Street. It is part of the Catholic parish of Newport, Birdhill and Toor which is in the Archdiocese of Cashel and Emly.

=== Services ===
There is a Garda station and an unmanned fire station (which has a pager notice system) in the town. Newport also has a post office, the Mulcair Credit Union, a butcher, restaurants and fast food outlets, a veterinary clinic, music academy, and mechanic and motor parts shop.

=== Recreation ===
Three kilometres from the town there is the beauty spot called Clare Glens. It is a wooded area along the banks of the Clare River.

== Sport ==
=== Association football ===
Founded in 1970, by the 2016/2017 season Newport Town AFC had a playing membership in excess of 300 and 26 teams. The club fields teams from U.6 to Junior with participation in three leagues, LDSL for schoolboy teams, NTSFL for schoolgirl teams and the LDMC for youth and junior teams. Derryleigh Park, the home of Newport Town AFC, is located just outside the town of Newport and has two sand-based playing pitches, a 60-metre by 40-metre floodlit astro-turf pitch and a modern clubhouse with four changing rooms. The club's pitch was previously located in "Freigh", but the new pitch is located in Derryleigh.

=== GAA ===
Newport GAA sports facilities are based at Páirc Chuimhneacháin Pádraig Uí Riain locally known as Lacken Park. It features a full-size field with floodlights with a small stand, a Juvenile field with lights and a small training field. There is also a clubs room. It is named after Patrick Ryan.

=== Other sports ===
Other sports clubs in the area include Mulcair Golf Society, Newport Athletic Club, and Newport Taekwondo Club.

== Notable people ==
- Denis Carey, composer and member of the Brock McGuire Band
- William Lee (1941–2024), Catholic Bishop of Waterford and Lismore
- Sharlene Mawdsley (born 1998), Irish athlete, 400 metres
- Conor O'Mahony, hurler for Newport and Tipperary
- Denis Ryan, Irish-Canadian folk musician, born Newport
- Patrick Ryan (1898–1944), politician, TD for Tipperary
- Edmund Waller (1797–1851), fourth baronet of Newport
