= Ballina GAA =

Gaelic games club in County Tipperary, Ireland

- Béal an Átha
- Founded: 1885
- County: Tipperary
- Colours: Blue & White
- Grounds: Ballina
- Coordinates: 52.811582°N 8.439131°W

Playing kits
Standard colours

Ballina GAA is a Gaelic Athletic Association club that plays hurling and Gaelic football. The club is located in the village of Ballina, County Tipperary in Ireland. The club plays in the North division of Tipperary GAA.

== History ==
It was founded in 1885 and won its first championship - the North division Junior Hurling Championship - in 1932. The club has not won a senior county title in any code.

== Honours ==
Hurling

- Tipperary Intermediate Hurling Championship (1): 2013
- North Tipperary Intermediate Hurling Championship (1): 2013
- Tipperary Junior A Hurling Championship (2): 1984, 1996
- North Tipperary Junior A Hurling Championship (5): 1932, 1967, 1984, 1990, 1996
- North Tipperary Junior B Hurling Championship (2): 2008, 2026

Football

- Tipperary Intermediate Football Championship (1): 2022
- North Tipperary Intermediate Football Championship (1): 2004
- Tipperary Junior A Football Championship (2): 2003, 2021
- North Tipperary Junior A Football Championship (5): 2000, 2002, 2003, 2020, 2021

== Notable players ==
- Michael Breen
