= Silvermines GAA =

Gaelic games club in County Tipperary, Ireland

- CLG Béal Átha Gabhann
- County: Tipperary
- Colours: Blue & white
- Grounds: Dolla
- Coordinates: 52.775199°N 8.189836°W

Playing kits
Standard colours

Silvermines GAA (Irish: CLG Béal Átha Gabhann) is a Gaelic Athletic Association (GAA) club in County Tipperary, Ireland. It plays hurling, camogie, Gaelic football and handball at county level and in the North division of Tipperary GAA. The club is a part of North Tipperary GAA.

== Hurling ==
=== Honours ===
- Munster Intermediate Club Hurling Championship
  - 2012
- Tipperary Intermediate Hurling Championship:
  - 1972, 1999, 2012
- North Tipperary Senior Hurling Championship:
  - 1974
- North Tipperary Intermediate Hurling Championship:
  - 1945, 1948, 1972, 1987, 1994, 1997, 1998, 1999, 2006, 2011, 2012

=== Notable players ===
- Jason Forde: Three time All-Ireland Senior Hurling Championship winner, 2016, 2019, 2025
- Noel Sheehy: Tipperary hurler 1986-97 - Twice All-Ireland Senior Hurling Championship winner, 1989, 1991. All-Ireland Minor winner 1982 & All-Ireland Under-21 winner 1985. National Hurling League winner 1988 & 1994.
- Jim Keogh: Tipperary hurler 1973-1984. National Hurling League winner 1979. North Tipperary Senior hurling championship winner 1974.

== Camogie ==
=== Notable players ===
- Noelle Kennedy, five times All-Ireland medallist

== Facilities ==
The club's grounds are situated in Dolla, approximately 6 km from Nenagh.

The facilities at the grounds include two full sized GAA pitches, a juvenile pitch, 40x20 handball alley and a hurling wall. The main pitch is separated from the remainder of the grounds and has a spectator stand, viewing slopes, sideline seating, dugouts and scoreboard. Entry to this pitch is by way of turnstiles which are situated in a building which also incorporates a shop and a medical room.

In recent years the venue has accommodated divisional and county finals at various grades, including Junior, U-21 and Minor levels. It is also used as a venue for schools and colleges matches.
