= Borrisokane GAA =

Gaelic games club in County Tipperary, Ireland

- Founded: 1885
- County: Tipperary
- Colours: Green and White
- Grounds: Páirc Gairnéir

Playing kits
Standard colours

Borrisokane GAA is a Gaelic Athletic Association club in County Tipperary in Ireland. Located in the town of Borrisokane, it is one of the oldest Gaelic games clubs in Ireland. It plays hurling and Gaelic football at all levels in the North division of Tipperary GAA.

== History ==
In 2010, Borrisokane won the Tipperary Intermediate Hurling Championship which was their second title at that grade.

=== Honours ===
- North Tipperary Senior Hurling Championship (1)
  - 1933
- Tipperary Intermediate Hurling Championship (2)
  - 1982, 2010
- Munster Intermediate Club Hurling Championship Runners- up
  - 2010
- North Tipperary Intermediate Hurling Championship (7)
  - 1940, 1952, 1958, 1973, 1982, 1995, 1996
- Tipperary Intermediate Football Championship (1)
  - 1994
- North Tipperary Intermediate Football Championship (9)
  - 1981, 1982, 1986, 1987, 1991, 1992,1994, 2014, 2016
- Tipperary Junior A Hurling Championship (2)
  - 1940, 1981
- North Tipperary Junior A Hurling Championship (3)
  - 1963, 1965, 1981
- Tipperary Junior A Football Championship (1)
  - 2012
- North Tipperary Junior A Football Championship (1)
  - 1938
- North Tipperary Junior C Hurling Championship (1)
  - 2009
- North Tipperary Under-21 A Hurling Championship (1)
  - 1960
- North Tipperary Under-21 B Hurling Championship (1)
  - 2013
- North Tipperary Under-21 A Football Championship (1)
  - 2013
- Tipperary Under-21 B Football Championship (1)
  - 2012
- North Tipperary Under-21 B Football Championship (2)
  - 2012, 2014
- North Tipperary Minor A Hurling Championship (1)
  - 1957 (with Shannon Rovers
- North Tipperary Minor B Hurling Championship
  - 2016
- Tipperary Minor C Hurling Championship (1)
  - 2001
- North Tipperary Minor B Football Championship (5)
  - 1998, 2003, 2004, 2010, 2016
