= Tipperary county hurling team =

Hurling team

Tipperary
- Sport: Hurling
- Irish: Tiobraid Árann
- Nickname(s): The Premier men
- County board: Tipperary GAA
- Manager: Liam Cahill
- Captain: Ronan Maher
- Home venue(s): Semple Stadium, Thurles

Recent competitive record
- Current All-Ireland status: Munster (5th in 2026)
- Last championship title: 2025
- Current NHL Division: 1A (3rd in 2026)
- Last league title: 2008
First colours

The Tipperary county hurling team represents Tipperary in hurling and is governed by Tipperary GAA, the county board of the Gaelic Athletic Association. The team competes in the three major annual inter-county competitions; the All-Ireland Senior Hurling Championship, the Munster Senior Hurling Championship and the National Hurling League.

Tipperary's home ground is Semple Stadium, Thurles. The team's manager is Liam Cahill.

The team last won the Munster Senior Championship in 2016, the All-Ireland Senior Championship in 2025 and the National League in 2008.

== History ==
The teams of the Tipperary County Board, together with those of Kilkenny GAA and Cork GAA, lead the roll of honour in the All-Ireland Senior Hurling Championship (SHC). The Board's teams have won 29 All-Ireland SHC titles as of 2025 — the third most successful of all county boards. Three teams also have the distinction of twice winning three consecutive All-Ireland finals (1898, 1899, 1900) and (1949, 1950, 1951). The team of the 1960s is considered the greatest of all Tipperary teams. The county's fortunes declined during the latter half of the twentieth century to the extent that only seven All-Ireland SHC titles were won in the period 1966–2019; however, new systems and extensive work at underage level brought SHC titles to Tipperary in 2010, 2016, and 2019, with old rival Kilkenny defeated in all three. As well as being victorious in four minor and three U21 All-Ireland hurling finals since 2006. For more detail on hurling history, see here.

== Team sponsorship ==
Since 1991 the following companies have sponsored all of the Tipperary hurling teams.

- 1991–1997: Tipperary Water
- 1992–1994: National Irish Bank
- 1995–2001: Finches
- 2002–2011: Enfer Scientific
- 2011–2014: Škoda
- 2015–2018: Intersport/Elverys
- 2019–2021: Teneo
- 2022–2025: Fiserv
- 2026–: Clover

== Support ==
There exists a supporters' club. According to Liam Kearns, this provides €100,000 in revenue annually for the hurling team. Babs Keating first established it in 1986 and it was the first such supporters' club in Gaelic games. By 2016, it had raised several million euro for the county hurling team.

== Rivalries ==
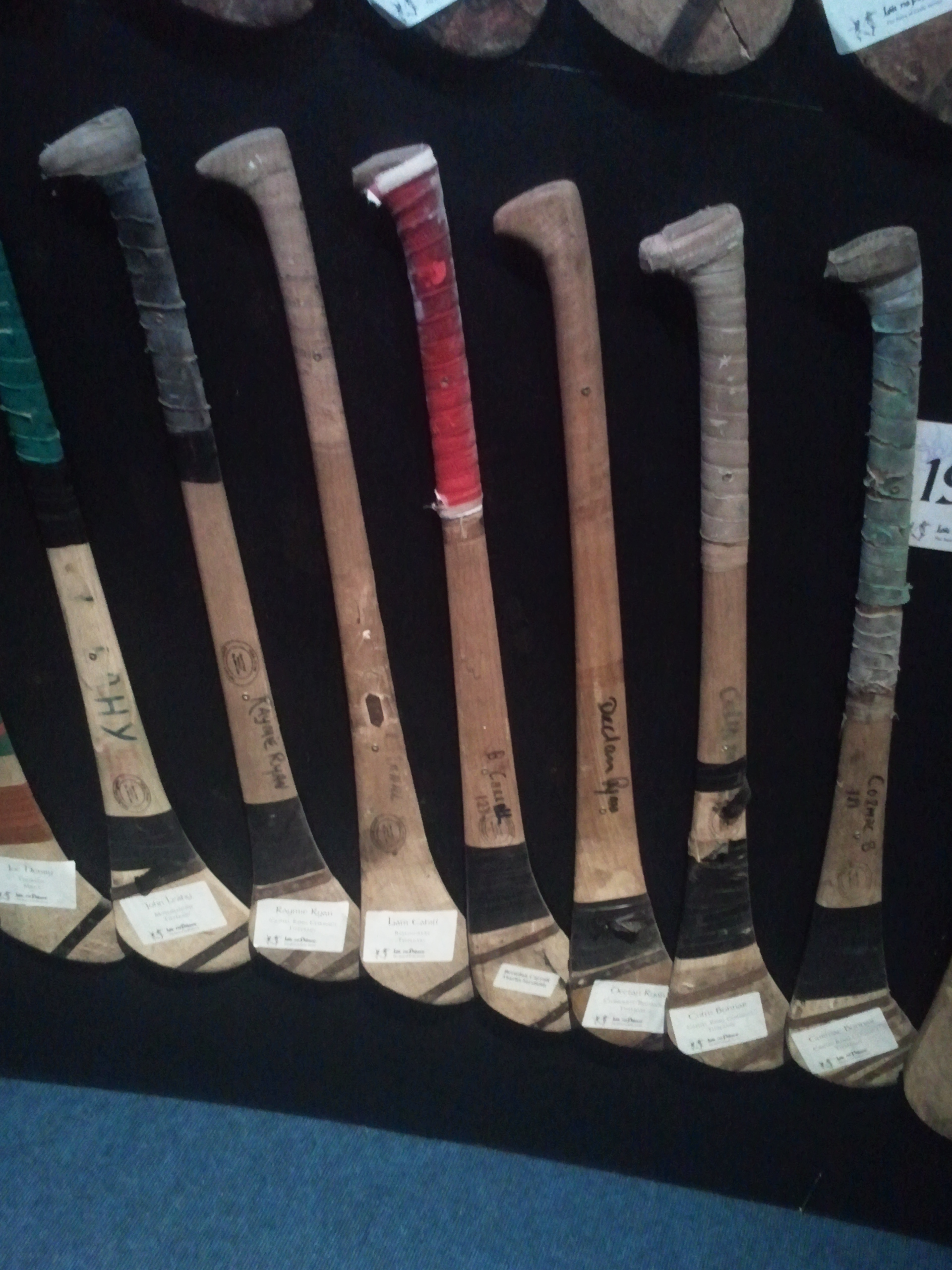
Sticks of John Leahy, Raymie Ryan, Liam Cahill, Brendan Carroll, Declan Ryan, Colm Bonnar, Cormac Bonnar

In the All-Ireland series, Kilkenny are Tipp's main rivals. This rivalry has lasted since Kilkenny's coming to power in the early 20th century. Tipp are the only team to have beaten Kilkenny in the All-Ireland SHC (and also in All-Ireland SHC finals) more times than they have lost.

Another rival of Tipperary, in the Munster Senior Hurling Championship (SHC), is Cork. These teams have met 80 times in the championship, more than any other rivalry in hurling. They have also met them countless times in the National League and pre-season challenge tournaments. A Tipp and Cork Munster hurling final in Semple Stadium is often claimed by supporters of both counties to be the most traditional Munster final and the games between them are nearly always close. The draw and replay games of 1987 and 1991 and the 1949–1954 rivalry encapsulates this rivalry and the 1991 replayed final in Thurles is claimed to be one of the greatest Munster hurling finals. This is one of the few rivalries in the provincial championships that is contested by two teams of similar stature whose honours and titles complement each other on a fairly equal basis. Kilkenny and Wexford in hurling have major difference in titles and in football, Dublin and Meath also have a gap between their respective winnings. The football teams of Galway and Mayo enjoy a similar rivalry and whose honours are divided in equal measure.

Tipp also have a strong rivalry with the other county teams in Munster and have had major tussles with Limerick in the 1930s and 40s when the latter's star was in the ascendent, though Tipp enjoy a major advantage in titles and honours won. The Tipp – Clare rivalry came with Clare's coming to power in the 1990s and the Tipp-Waterford rivalry was forged in the period 1957-63 and renewed again due to Waterford's resurgence in the 2000s, when that county enjoyed its most successful period of the modern era.

== Panel ==
Team as per Tipperary vs Cork in the 2025 All-Ireland Senior Hurling Championship Final, 20th July 2025:

No.	Player	Position	Club
1	Rhys Shelly	Goalkeeper	Moycarkey–Borris
2	Robert Doyle	Right corner-back	Clonoulty–Rossmore
3	Eoghan Connolly	Full back	Cashel King Cormacs
4	Michael Breen	Left corner-back	Ballina
5	Craig Morgan	Right half-back	Kilruane MacDonagh's
6	Ronan Maher (c)	Centre back	Thurles Sarsfields
7	Bryan O'Mara	Left half-back	Holycross–Ballycahill
8	Willie Connors	Midfield	Kiladangan
9	Conor Stakelum	Midfield	Thurles Sarsfields
10	Jake Morris	Right half-forward	Nenagh Éire Óg
11	Andrew Ormond	Centre forward	JK Brackens
12	Sam O'Farrell	Left half-forward	Nenagh Éire Óg
13	Darragh McCarthy	Right corner-forward	Toomevara
14	John McGrath	Full forward	Loughmore–Castleiney
15	Jason Forde	Left corner-forward	Silvermines

No.	Player	Position	Club
16	Barry Hogan	Goalkeeper	Kiladangan
17	Joe Caesar	Wing-back	Holycross–Ballycahill
18	Séamus Kennedy	Wing-back	St Mary's
19	Paddy McCormack	Corner-forward	Borris–Ileigh
20	Brian McGrath	Full-back	Loughmore–Castleiney
21	Noel McGrath	Midfield	Loughmore–Castleiney
22	Peter McGarry	Midfield	St Mary's
23	Oisín O'Donoghue	Corner-forward	Cashel King Cormacs
24	Johnny Ryan	Wing-forward	Arravale Rovers
25	Darragh Stakelum	Midfield	Thurles Sarsfields
26	Alan Tynan	Forward	Roscrea

^{INJ} Player has had an injury which has affected recent involvement with the county team.
^{RET} Player has since retired from the county team.
^{WD} Player has since withdrawn from the county team due to a non-injury issue.

== Management team ==
Appointed in July 2022:

- Manager: Liam Cahill, appointed on a three-year term ahead of the 2023 season and given a two-year extension in October 2025, with the option of a third year.
- Backroom team: Declan Laffan (Loughmore–Castleiney), T. J. Ryan (Clonoulty–Rossmore); appointed ahead of the 2023 season
- Coach: Michael Bevans, appointed ahead of the 2023 season

== Managerial history ==
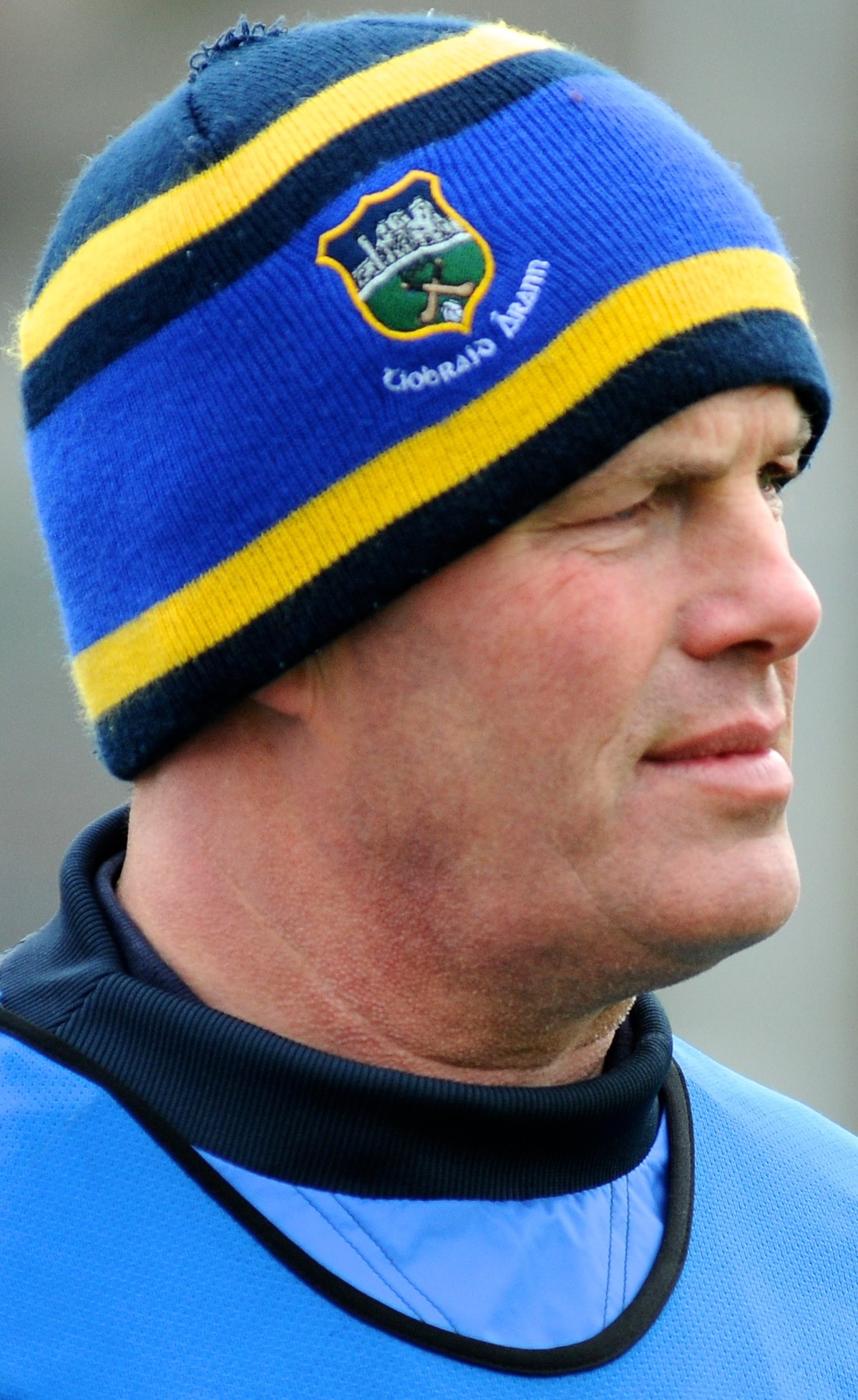
Ken Hogan managed the team between 2003 and 2005.

Tipperary — like Cork and Kilkenny — traditionally appoints managers from inside, rather than seeking a "foreign" appointment.

Dates	Name	Origin	Provincial titles	All-Ireland SHC titles	National League titles
1971–1978	Donie Nealon	Burgess	1971	1971	—N/a
1978–1985	Len Gaynor	Kilruane MacDonagh's	—N/a	—N/a	1979
1985–1986	Tony Wall	Thurles Sarsfields	—N/a	—N/a	—N/a
1986–1994	Babs Keating	Ballybacon–Grange	1987, 1988, 1989, 1991, 1993	1989, 1991	1988, 1994
1994–1996	Fr Tom Fogarty	Moyne–Templetuohy	—N/a	—N/a	—N/a
1996–1998	Len Gaynor (2)	Kilruane MacDonagh's	—N/a	—N/a	—N/a
1998–2002	Nicky English	Lattin–Cullen	2001	2001	1999, 2001
2002–2003	Michael Doyle	Holycross–Ballycahill	—N/a	—N/a	—N/a
2003–2005	Ken Hogan	Lorrha–Dorrha	—N/a	—N/a	—N/a
2005–2007	Babs Keating (2)	Ballybacon–Grange	—N/a	—N/a	—N/a
2007–2010	Liam Sheedy	Portroe	2008, 2009	2010	2008
2010–2012	Declan Ryan	Clonoulty–Rossmore	2011, 2012	—N/a	—N/a
2012–2015	Eamon O'Shea	Kilruane MacDonagh's	2015	—N/a	—N/a
2016–2018	Michael Ryan	Upperchurch–Drombane	2016	2016	—N/a
2018–2021	Liam Sheedy (2)	Portroe	—N/a	2019	—N/a
2021–2022	Colm Bonnar	Cashel King Cormacs; Dunhill	—N/a	—N/a	—N/a
2022–	Liam Cahill	Ballingarry	—N/a	2025	—N/a

== Players ==
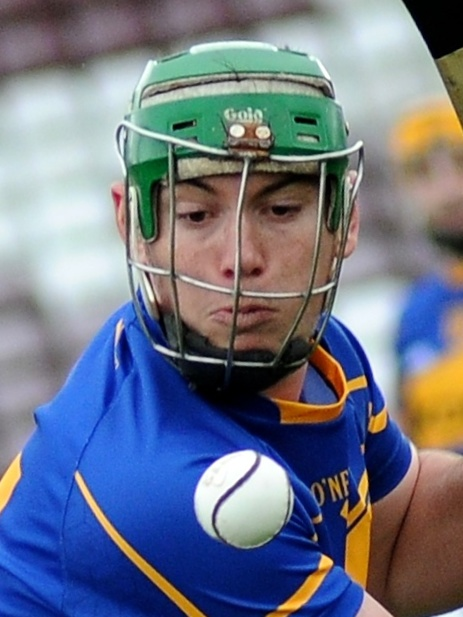
John O'Dwyer against Galway in the 2015 National Hurling League

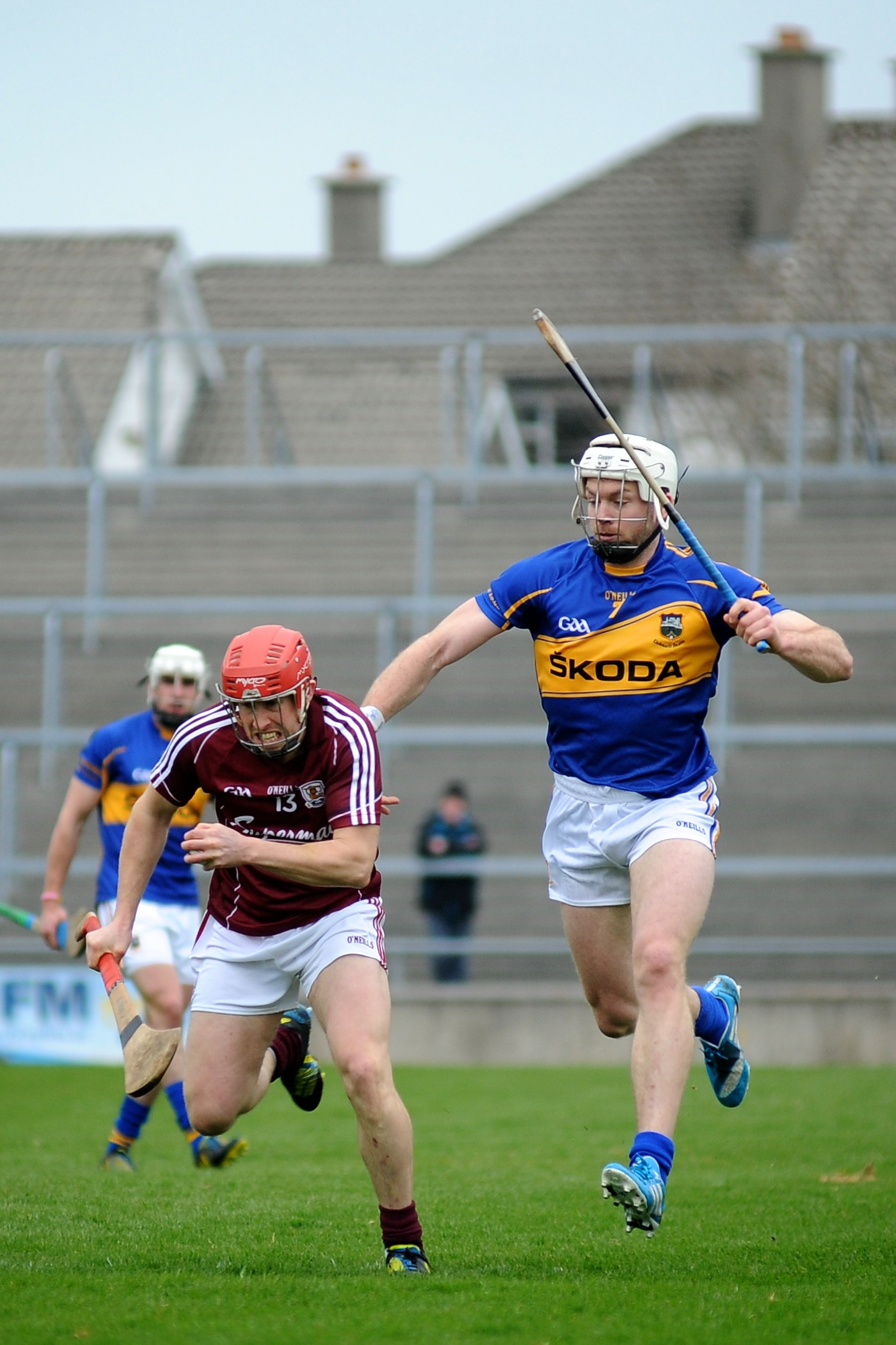
Pádraic Maher (right) against Galway in the 2015 National Hurling League

=== Captaincy ===
Historically, the captain of the Tipperary senior hurling team for each season was decided by the club that won the preceding Tipperary Senior Hurling Championship. For example, Willie Ryan was the team captain for 2009, as chosen by his club Toomevara. This system, however, meant there was little consistency from year to year and often meant that the team captain was not an integral part of the team or even a first choice player (as in the Willie Ryan example).

For the 2010 season, the responsibility for choosing the team captain was given to the county's management team. On 12 February 2010, it was announced that Eoin Kelly from the Mullinahone club would captain the county, with Declan Fanning acting as vice-captain. Eoin Kelly was again selected as captain for the 2011 season. Paul Curran was named as hurling captain in January 2012.

In February 2013, Shane McGrath was appointed captain for the 2013 season.

In October 2013, Brendan Maher was named as Tipperary captain for the 2014 season. Maher continued as captain for the 2015 and 2016 seasons.

In November 2016, it was announced that Pádraic Maher had been nominated as Tipperary hurling team captain for the 2017 season.

On 22 January 2019, Séamus Callanan was named as Tipperary hurling team captain for the 2019 season. He remained as captain for the 2020 and 2021 seasons.

On 5 February 2022, Ronan Maher was named as team captain for the 2022 season. The decision was made by a secret ballot vote from all members of the panel. On 14 November 2022, Noel McGrath was named as the new Tipperary captain for the 2023 season.

On 30 January 2024, Ronan Maher was named as captain for 2024, with Jake Morris named as vice-captain. Maher had previously been the captain in 2022.

On 23 January 2025, Ronan Maher was again named as captain for 2025, with Jake Morris also retained as vice-captain.

=== Records ===
==== Most All-Ireland SHC medals ====
Multi All-Ireland SHC winners
Medals	Players
8	John Doyle
6	Jimmy Doyle
5	Kieran Carey, Tommy Doyle, Theo English, Mikey Maher, Donie Nealon, Tony Wall, John Walsh Snr, Liam Devaney, Mick Burns, Jack Maher, Michael Maher
4	Mickey 'The Rattler' Byrne, Seán McLoughlin, John 'Mackey' McKenna, Pat Ryan, Jack Gleeson, Mike Wall, John O'Donoghue, Denis Walsh, Tony Brennan, Phil Byrne, Pat Stakelum, Tim Condon, Ed Maher, Tommy Ryan, Noel McGrath
3	Jimmy Finn, Paddy Kenny, Phil Kenny, Seán Kenny, Declan Ryan, Pat Stakelum, Tony Reddin, Mick Roche, Len Gaynor, John Hough, Jack Power, Paddy Riordan, Donal Ryan, Jack Ryan, Phil Ryan, Tom Ryan, Tommy Ryan, Jim O'Keefe, Joe O'Keeffe, Peter O'Sullivan, Will Devane, Jim Devitt, Jack Doherty, Watty Dunne, Mick Ryan, Paddy Fahey, Jack 'Thady' Flanagan, Séamus Bannon, Ned Brennan, John Maher, Sonny Maher, Roger Mounsey, Mick Murphy, Tom Semple, Phil Shanahan, Hugh Shelly, John Leahy, William Carroll, Flor Coffey, Jack Connolly, Liam Connolly, Mick Hynes, Jimmy Kennedy, Séamus Callanan, Brendan Maher, Patrick Maher, Pádraic Maher, Ronan Maher, Jason Forde, John McGrath, Séamus Kennedy, Michael Breen
2	Eoin Kelly, Nicky English, Bobby Ryan, Pat Fox, Noel Sheehy, Michael Cleary, Ken Hogan, Declan Carr, Aidan Ryan, Conor O'Donovan, Cormac Bonnar, Colm Bonnar, Conal Bonnar, Lar Corbett, Brendan Cummins, John O'Brien, Michael Cahill, Gearóid Ryan

=== Cú Chulainn Awards ===
1963: John Doyle, Liam Devaney, Jimmy Doyle
1964: John Doyle^{2nd}, Tony Wall, Mick Roche^{2nd}, Theo English, Donie Nealon, Babs Keating, John "Mackey" McKenna, Jimmy Doyle^{2nd}
1965: John O'Donoghue, Kieran Carey, Tony Wall^{2nd}, Seán McLoughlin, Mick Roche^{3rd}, Donie Nealon^{2nd}, Jimmy Doyle^{3rd}
1966: Theo English^{2nd}, John "Mackey" McKenna^{2nd}
1967: Mick Roche^{4th}, Donie Nealon^{3rd}, Len Gaynor, Babs Keating^{2nd}

=== All Stars ===
Tipperary has 111 All Stars, as of 2025. 54 different players have won, as of 2025. Nicky English, Eoin Kelly and Pádraic Maher each won six All Stars. Tipperary players have received at least one All Star in 40 of the 52 years since the inauguration of the All Stars Awards Scheme.

1971: Tadhg O'Connor, Mick Roche, Francis Loughnane, Babs Keating
1972: Francis Loughnane^{2nd}
1973: Francis Loughnane^{3rd}
1975: Tadhg O'Connor^{2nd}
1978: Thomas Butler
1979: Pat McLoughney, Tadhg O'Connor^{3rd}
1980: Pat McLoughney^{2nd}
1983: Nicky English
1984: Nicky English^{2nd}
1985: Nicky English^{3rd}
1986: Bobby Ryan
1987: Ken Hogan, Aidan Ryan, Pat Fox, Nicky English^{4th}
1988: Bobby Ryan^{2nd}, Colm Bonnar, Declan Ryan, Nicky English^{5th}
1989: Conal Bonnar, Bobby Ryan^{3rd}, Declan Carr, Pat Fox^{2nd}, Cormac Bonnar, Nicky English^{6th}
1990: Noel Sheehy, Michael Cleary
1991: Paul Delaney, Noel Sheehy^{2nd}, Conal Bonnar^{2nd}, John Leahy, Michael Cleary^{2nd}, Pat Fox^{3rd}, Cormac Bonnar^{2nd}
1992: Michael Cleary^{3rd}
1993: Michael Cleary^{4th}
1994: John Leahy^{2nd}
1996: Liam Cahill
1997: Paul Shelly, Tommy Dunne, Declan Ryan^{2nd}, John Leahy^{3rd}
1999: Tommy Dunne^{2nd}
2000: Brendan Cummins, John Carroll
2001: Brendan Cummins^{2nd}, Philip Maher, Eamonn Corcoran, Tommy Dunne^{3rd}, Eddie Enright, Mark O'Leary, Eoin Kelly
2002: Paul Kelly, Eoin Kelly^{2nd}
2003: Brendan Cummins^{3rd}
2004: Eoin Kelly^{3rd}
2005: Paul Kelly^{2nd}, Eoin Kelly^{4th}
2006: Eoin Kelly^{5th}
2007: Declan Fanning
2008: Brendan Cummins^{4th}, Conor O'Mahony, Shane McGrath
2009: Pádraic Maher, Conor O'Mahony^{2nd}, Lar Corbett, Noel McGrath
2010: Brendan Cummins^{5th}, Paul Curran, Brendan Maher, Noel McGrath^{2nd}, Lar Corbett^{2nd}, Eoin Kelly^{6th}
2011: Paul Curran^{2nd}, Michael Cahill, Pádraic Maher^{2nd}, Lar Corbett^{3rd}
2014: Darren Gleeson, Brendan Maher^{2nd}, Pádraic Maher^{3rd}, Shane McGrath^{2nd}, John O'Dwyer, Patrick Maher, Séamus Callanan
2015: Séamus Callanan^{2nd}
2016: Cathal Barrett, James Barry, Ronan Maher, Pádraic Maher^{4th}, Patrick Maher^{2nd}, Séamus Callanan^{3rd}, John McGrath
2017: Pádraic Maher^{5th}
2019: Brian Hogan, Cathal Barrett^{2nd}, Ronan Maher^{2nd}, Brendan Maher^{3rd}, Pádraic Maher^{6th}, Noel McGrath^{3rd}, Séamus Callanan^{4th}
2025: Ronan Maher^{3rd}, John McGrath^{2nd}, Rhys Shelly, Robert Doyle, Eoghan Connolly, Jake Morris, Andrew Ormond

All Star winners
Awards	Players
6	Nicky English, Eoin Kelly, Pádraic Maher
5	Brendan Cummins
4	Michael Cleary, Séamus Callanan
3	Francis Loughnane, Bobby Ryan, Pat Fox, John Leahy, Tommy Dunne, Lar Corbett, Noel McGrath, Brendan Maher, Ronan Maher
2	Tadhg O'Connor, Pat McLoughney, Declan Ryan, Conal Bonnar, Cormac Bonnar, Noel Sheehy, Paul Kelly, Conor O'Mahony, Shane McGrath, Paul Curran, Patrick Maher, Cathal Barrett, John McGrath
1	Mick Roche, Babs Keating, Thomas Butler, Ken Hogan, Aidan Ryan, Colm Bonnar, Declan Carr, Paul Delaney, Liam Cahill, Paul Shelly, John Carroll, Philip Maher, Eamonn Corcoran, Eddie Enright, Mark O'Leary, Declan Fanning, Michael Cahill, Darren Gleeson, John O'Dwyer, James Barry, Brian Hogan, Ryhs Shelly, Robert Doyle, Eoghan Connolly, Jake Morris, Andrew Ormond

Cú Chulainn Award winners
Awards	Players
3	Mick Roche, Donie Nealon, John McKenna, Jimmy Doyle
2	Babs Keating, Tony Wall, Theo English, John Doyle
1	Liam Devaney, Kieran Carey, Seán McLoughlin, Len Gaynor, John O'Donoghue

Hurler of the Year winners
Award	Players
Texaco HOTY	Tony Wall (1958), Liam Devaney (1961), Donie Nealon (1962), John Doyle (1964), Jimmy Doyle (1965), Babs Keating (1971), Nicky English (1989), Pat Fox (1991), Tommy Dunne (2001), Lar Corbett (2010)
All-Stars HOTY	Tommy Dunne (2001), Lar Corbett (2010), Séamus Callanan (2019), John McGrath (2025)

== Honours ==
=== National ===
- All-Ireland Senior Hurling Championship
  - (gold) Winners (29): 1887, 1895, 1896, 1898, 1899, 1900, 1906, 1908, 1916, 1925, 1930, 1937, 1945, 1949, 1950, 1951, 1958, 1961, 1962, 1964, 1965, 1971, 1989, 1991, 2001, 2010, 2016, 2019, 2025
  - (silver) Runners-up (13): 1909, 1911, 1913, 1917, 1922, 1960, 1967, 1968, 1988, 1997, 2009, 2011, 2014
- National Hurling League
  - (gold) Winners (19): 1927–28, 1948–49, 1949–50, 1951–52, 1953–54, 1954–55, 1956–57, 1958–59, 1959–60, 1960–61, 1963–64, 1964–65, 1967–68, 1978–79, 1987–88, 1993–94, 1999, 2001, 2008
  - (silver) Runners-up (21): 1930–31, 1937–38, 1939–40, 1947–48, 1952–53, 1955–56, 1962–63, 1965–66, 1970–71, 1974–75, 1988–89, 1991–92, 1995–96, 2000, 2003, 2009, 2013, 2014, 2017, 2018, 2025
- All-Ireland Intermediate Hurling Championship
  - (gold) Winners (7): 1963, 1966, 1971, 1972, 2000, 2012, 2013
- All-Ireland Junior Hurling Championship
  - (gold) Winners (9): 1913, 1915, 1924, 1926, 1930, 1933, 1953, 1989, 1991
- All-Ireland Under-21 Hurling Championship
  - (gold) Winners (12): 1964, 1967, 1979, 1980, 1981, 1985, 1989, 1995, 2010, 2018, 2019, 2025
- All-Ireland Minor Hurling Championship
  - (gold) Winners (21): 1930, 1932, 1933, 1934, 1947, 1949, 1952, 1953, 1955, 1956, 1957, 1959, 1976, 1980, 1982, 1996, 2006, 2007, 2012, 2016, 2022, 2024
- All-Ireland Vocational Schools Championship
  - (gold) Winners (14): 1962, 1964, 1965, 1966, 1967, 1968, 1969, 1974, 1978, 1988, 1990, 2004, 2010, 2011 (1962–1978 winners were North Tipperary)

=== Provincial ===
- Munster Senior Hurling Championship
  - (gold) Winners (42): 1895, 1896, 1898, 1899, 1900, 1906, 1908, 1909, 1913, 1916, 1917, 1922, 1924, 1925, 1930, 1937, 1941, 1945, 1949, 1950, 1951, 1958, 1960, 1961, 1962, 1964, 1965, 1967, 1968, 1971, 1987, 1988, 1989, 1991, 1993, 2001, 2008, 2009, 2011, 2012, 2015, 2016
  - (silver) Runners-up (28): 1894, 1904, 1907, 1911, 1912, 1923, 1926, 1935, 1936, 1942, 1952, 1953, 1954, 1963, 1969, 1970, 1973, 1984, 1985, 1990, 1996, 1997, 2000, 2002, 2005, 2006, 2019, 2021
- Waterford Crystal Cup
  - (gold) Winners (4): 2007, 2008, 2012, 2014
- Munster Intermediate Hurling Championship
  - (gold) Winners (9): 1961, 1963, 1966, 1971, 1972, 2000, 2002, 2012, 2013
- Munster Junior Hurling Championship
  - (gold) Winners (16): 1910, 1911, 1913, 1915, 1924, 1926, 1928, 1930, 1933, 1951, 1953, 1985, 1988, 1989, 1990, 1991
- Munster Under-21 Hurling Championship
  - (gold) Winners (23): 1964, 1965, 1967, 1972, 1978, 1979, 1980, 1981, 1983, 1984, 1985, 1989, 1990, 1995, 1999, 2003, 2004, 2006, 2008, 2010, 2019, 2024, 2025
- Munster Minor Hurling Championship
  - (gold) Winners (42): 1930, 1931, 1932, 1933, 1934, 1935, 1945, 1946, 1947, 1949, 1950, 1952, 1953, 1954, 1955, 1956, 1957, 1959, 1960, 1961, 1962, 1973, 1976, 1980, 1982, 1983, 1987, 1991, 1993, 1996, 1997, 1999, 2001, 2002, 2003, 2007, 2012, 2015, 2016, 2018, 2022, 2024
