= 1991 All-Ireland Senior Hurling Championship final =

1991 All-Ireland Senior Hurling Final
- Event: 1991 All-Ireland Senior Hurling Championship
Tipperary	Kilkenny
1-16	0-15
- Date: 1 September 1991
- Venue: Croke Park, Dublin
- Man of the Match: Pat Fox
- Referee: Willie Horgan (Cork)
- Attendance: 64,500

The 1991 All-Ireland Senior Hurling Championship Final was the 104th All-Ireland Final and the culmination of the 1991 All-Ireland Senior Hurling Championship, an inter-county hurling tournament for the top teams in Ireland. The match was held at Croke Park, Dublin, on 1 September 1991, between Tipperary and Kilkenny. The Leinster champions lost to their Munster opponents on a score line of 1–16 to 0-15.

== All-Ireland final ==
=== Overview ===
The All-Ireland hurling final was the final match of the 1991 All-Ireland Senior Hurling Championship. The match was contested by Tipperary and Kilkenny on 1 September 1991 at Croke Park, Dublin, and had an attendance of 64,500. It was Tipperary's third appearance in the championship decider in four years, having lost and won the respective finals of 1988 and 1989. Kilkenny were lining out in their first final since losing the 1987 decider to Galway. Furthermore, it was the first championship meeting of these two great rivals since 1971, when Tipperary were the winners.

Tipperary were red-hot favourites and not just because of their traditional hoodoo over their nearest neighbours. The team's performances in the provincial championship and their comprehensive defeat of Galway in the All-Ireland semi-final resulted in the premier county being given the bookies nod. Kilkenny had struggles through each of their provincial games and only scraped past Antrim in the All-Ireland semi-final.

=== Match report ===
At 3:30pm match referee Willie Horgan of Cork threw in the sliotar and the game was on. Kilkenny took the game to Tipperary from the throw-in, with veteran hurler Christy Heffernan causing havoc for the Tipp defence, a group of players who had been lambasted for their earlier performance against Cork. On this occasion, however, they rescued the team from wave after wave of Kilkenny attack. Defensive grit kept Tipperary in the game in the first half and both sides left the field at half-time with 0-9 apiece.

The second-half saw Tipp get the breaks as the vital score of the match had more than a touch of luck about it. Michael Cleary, Tipp's ultra accurate free-taker, had been impressive all throughout the year. Ten minutes into the game he miss-hit a controversial twenty-metre free. The sliotar skewed into the Kilkenny net at the hill 16 end past a flat-footed Kilkenny defence. It was the score that gave Tipperary a lift and took the wind out of 'the Cats'’ sails. Tipperary always had a few points to spare over their rivals after that incident, with Pat Fox finishing off a wonderful championship campaign with an insurance point that gave his team a merited 1-16 to 0-15 victory. It was his fifth from play as he collected the man of the match award. Declan Carr had the honour of collecting the Liam MacCarthy Cup on the occasion of Tipperary’s twenty-fourth All-Ireland victory.

== Match details ==
1 September 1991
15:30 UTC+1

Tipperary	1-16 – 0-15	Kilkenny

Croke Park, Dublin
Attendance: 64,500
Referee: Willie Horgan (Cork)

Tipperary	Kilkenny

TIPPERARY:
GK	1	Ken Hogan
RCB	2	Paul Delaney
FB	3	Noel Sheehy
LCB	4	Michael Ryan
RWB	5	Colm Bonnar
CB	6	Bobby Ryan
LWB	7	Conal Bonnar
M	8	Declan Carr (c)
M	9	Aidan Ryan
RWF	10	Michael Cleary
CF	11	Declan Ryan
LWF	12	John Leahy
RCF	13	Pat Fox
FF	14	Cormac Bonnar (substituted off)
LCF	15	Nicky English (substituted off)
Substitutes:
FF		Conor Stakelum for Cormac Bonnar (substituted in)
LCF		Donie O'Connell for N. English (substituted in)

KILKENNY:
GK	1	Michael Walsh
RCB	2	Bill Hennessy
FB	3	John Henderson
LCB	4	Liam Simpson
RWB	5	Liam Walsh
CB	6	Pat O'Neill
LWB	7	Willie O'Connor
M	8	Richie Power
M	9	Michael Phelan
RWF	10	John Power (substituted off)
CF	11	Christy Heffernan (c)
LWF	12	D. J. Carey
RCF	13	Eamon Morrissey
FF	14	Liam Fennelly
LCF	15	Liam McCarthy (substituted off)
Substitutes:
RWF		Lester Ryan for J. Power (substituted in)
LCF		Adrian Ronan for L. McCarthy (substituted in)

MATCH RULES

- 70 minutes
- Replay if scores level
- Maximum of 3 substitutions
