= 1988 All-Ireland Senior Hurling Championship final =

1988 All-Ireland Senior Hurling Final
- Event: 1988 All-Ireland Senior Hurling Championship
Galway	Tipperary
1-15	0-14
- Date: 4 September 1988
- Venue: Croke Park, Dublin
- Man of the Match: Tony Keady
- Referee: G. Kirwan (Offaly)
- Attendance: 63,545
- Weather: Dry

The 1988 All-Ireland Senior Hurling Championship Final was the 101st All-Ireland Final and the culmination of the 1988 All-Ireland Senior Hurling Championship, an inter-county hurling tournament for the top teams in Ireland. The match was held at Croke Park, Dublin, on 4 September 1988, between Galway and Tipperary. The Munster champions lost to the Connacht men on a score line of 1-15 to 0-14.

== Match details ==
4 September
Final

Galway	1–15 – 0–14	Tipperary
N. Lane (1–0), P. Malone (0–3), M. Naughton (0–2), M. McGrath (0–2), T. Keady (0–2, 0-1f, 0-1(70)), G. McInerney (0–2), J. Cooney (0–1), E. Ryan (0–1), B. Lynskey (0–1), C. Hayes (0–1f).	Report	N. English (0–6, 0-5f, 0-1pen), D. Ryan (0–4), D. O'Connell (0–2), A. Ryan (0–1), P. Delaney (0–1f).

Croke Park, Dublin
Attendance: 63,545
Referee: G. Kirwan (Offaly)

Galway	Tipperary

GALWAY GAA:
1	John Commins
2	Sylvie Linnane
3	Conor Hayes (c)
4	Ollie Kilkenny
5	Pete Finnerty
6	Tony Keady
7	Gerry McInerney
8	Michael Coleman
9	Pat Malone
10	Anthony Cunningham
11	Joe Cooney
12	Martin Naughton
13	Michael McGrath
14	Brendan Lynskey
15	Éanna Ryan
Substitutes Used:
19	N. Lane for A Cunningham (43 mins)
18	Tony Kilkenny for M. Naughton (57 mins)
21	Gerry Burke for B. Lynskey (68 mins)
Manager:
Cyril Farrell

TIPPERARY GAA:
1	Ken Hogan
2	Paul Delaney
3	Conor O'Donovan
4	John Heffernan
5	Bobby Ryan
6	Noel Sheehy
7	John Kennedy
8	Colm Bonnar
9	Joe Hayes
10	Declan Ryan
11	Donie O'Connell
12	John Leahy
13	Pat Fox
14	Nicky English (c)
15	Aidan Ryan
Substitutes Used:
20	Cormac Bonnar for J. Hayes (54 mins)
Manager:
Michael Babs Keating
