= Aidan Ryan (Tipperary hurler) =

Irish hurler (born 1965)

Personal information
- Native name: Aodán Ó Riain (Irish)
- Born: 30 January 1965 (age 61) Borrisoleigh, County Tipperary, Ireland
- Occupation: Carpenter
- Height: 5 ft 9 in (175 cm)

Sport
- Sport: Hurling
- Position: Left wing-forward
Club
- Years: Club
- Borris–Ileigh
Club titles
- Tipperary titles: 2
- Munster titles: 1
- All-Ireland Titles: 1
Inter-county*
Years	County	Apps (scores)
1984-1999	Tipperary	30 (3-39)
Inter-county titles
- Munster titles: 5
- All-Irelands: 2
- NHL: 3
- All Stars: 1
- *Inter County team apps and scores correct as of 13:26, 29 March 2018.

Aidan Ryan (born 30 January 1965) is an Irish retired hurler. His league and championship career with the Tipperary senior team spanned fifteen seasons from 1984 to 1999.

== Early life ==
Born in Borrisoleigh, County Tipperary, Ryan was raised in a family that had a longstanding association with hurling. His father, Tim Ryan, and his uncles, Ned Ryan and Pat Stakelum, won All-Ireland SHC medals with Tipperary between 1949 and 1951. Ryan attended Templemore CBS and was part of the school's senior hurling team that played in the Dr Harty Cup competition.

== Club career ==
Ryan began his career at juvenile and underage levels with the Borris-Ileigh club before eventually progressing to adult level. He collected his first silverware in 1983 when Borris-Ileigh beat Loughmore–Castleiney by 0–17 to 1–11 to claim the Tipperary SHC title.

After a three-year hiatus, Borris-Ileigh were back as Tipperary SHC winners in 1986 with Ryan collecting a second winners' medal after the 0–14 to 0–07 win over Kilruane MacDonaghs. He later added a Munster Club SHC medal to his collection after Borris-Ileigh beat Clarecastle to claim their inaugural provincial title. Ryan was at corner-forward when Borris-Ileigh subsequently defeated Rathnure by 2–09 to 0–09 in the 1987 All-Ireland club final.

== Inter-county career ==
Ryan began his inter-county career with Tipperary during a two-year tenure at minor level. He won a Munster MHC in his first season with the team in 1982, before later coming on as a substitute for Noel Sheehy in the 2–07 to 0–04 defeat of Galway in the 1982 All-Ireland minor final.

Ryan immediately progressed to the under-21 team and spent three years lining out in that grade. He won a Munster U21HC title in 1984, however, Tipperary were later beaten by Kilkenny in the 1984 All-Ireland under-21 final. Ryan claimed a second successive Munster U21HC medal in 1985, before winning an All-Ireland U21HC medal following a 1–10 to 2–06 win over Kilkenny.

Ryan joined the senior team in 1984. He won his first Munster SHC medal after a 4–22 to 1-22 extra-time defeat of Cork three years later in 1987. He ended the year by being presented with an All-Star award. Ryan added a National Hurling League medal and a second consecutive Munster SHC medal to his collection the following year. He later lined out at full-forward in the 1–15 to 0–14 defeat by Galway in the 1988 All-Ireland final. Ryan claimed a third successive Munster SHC medal in 1989. He later won his first All-Ireland SHC medal after coming on a substitute in the 4–24 to 3–09 defeat of Antrim in the 1989 All-Ireland final. His brother, Bobby Ryan, captained the team.

After surrendering their titles in 1990, Ryan won a fourth Munster SHC medal in five seasons after a 4–19 to 4–15 defeat of Cork. He later claimed a second All-Ireland SHC medal after scoring two points in the 1–16 to 0–15 defeat of Kilkenny in the 1991 All-Ireland final. Ryan won a fifth and final Munster SHC medal in 1993. He added a second National Hurling League title to his collection in 1994.

Ryan continued to line out for Tipperary and came on as a substitute in their 0–20 to 2–13 defeat by Clare in the 1997 All-Ireland final. He was part of Tipperary's National Hurling League-winning team in 1999, but played no part in the final. Ryan brought his inter-county career to an end shortly after.

== Honours ==
Borris–Ileigh

- All-Ireland Senior Club Hurling Championship: 1987
- Munster Senior Club Hurling Championship: 1986
- Tipperary Senior Hurling Championship: 1983, 1986

Tipperary

- All-Ireland Senior Hurling Championship: 1989, 1991
- Munster Senior Hurling Championship: 1987, 1988, 1989, 1991, 1993
- National Hurling League: 1987-88, 1993-94, 1999
- All-Ireland Under-21 Hurling Championship: 1985
- Munster Under-21 Hurling Championship: 1984, 1985
- All-Ireland Minor Hurling Championship: 1982
- Munster Minor Hurling Championship: 1982

Munster

- Railway Cup: 1992

Awards

- All Stars Awards (1): 1987
