= List of Tipperary senior hurling team captains =

This article lists players who have captained the Tipperary county hurling team in the Munster Senior Hurling Championship and the All-Ireland Senior Hurling Championship.

The captain is normally chosen from the club that has won the Tipperary Senior Hurling Championship. This did not happen in 1989. In that year, the reigning county champion Loughmore–Castleiney did not hold the captaincy during the championship as none of the club's players were deemed good enough to make the county team. In 1989, therefore, Pat McGrath of Loughmore–Castleiney was Tipperary captain during the league and Bobby Ryan of Borris–Ileigh was Tipperary captain during the championship. Had McGrath played in a championship match he would have been deemed captain for that game; in other words, had he come onto the field during the All-Ireland SHC final, he would have collected the trophy.

The same situation arose in the 2008 season. The county champion was again Loughmore–Castleiney, but that club did not maintain a presence on the county team. Eoin Kelly and Paul Ormond were named as joint-captains. Ormond represented the Loughmore–Castleiney club. Again, if Ormond played he was the captain. However, on each occasion that a trophy was won, both Kelly and Ormond collected it jointly. In all other cases, the captain came from the county hurling champion club.

== List of captains ==
#	Year	Player	Club	National titles	Provincial titles
	2026	Ronan Maher	Thurles Sarsfields		
	2025	Ronan Maher	Thurles Sarsfields	All-Ireland Hurling Final winning captain	
	2024	Ronan Maher	Thurles Sarsfields		
	2023	Noel McGrath	Loughmore-Castleiney		
	2022	Ronan Maher	Thurles Sarsfields		
	2021	Séamus Callanan	Drom-Inch		
	2020	Séamus Callanan	Drom-Inch		
	2019	Séamus Callanan	Drom-Inch	All-Ireland Hurling Final winning captain	
	2018	Pádraic Maher	Thurles Sarsfields		
	2017	Pádraic Maher	Thurles Sarsfields		
	2016	Brendan Maher	Borris-Ileigh	All-Ireland Hurling Final winning captain	Munster Hurling Final winning captain
	2015	Brendan Maher	Borris-Ileigh		Munster Hurling Final winning captain
	2014	Brendan Maher	Borris-Ileigh		
	2013	Shane McGrath	Ballinahinch		
	2012	Paul Curren	Mullinahone		Munster Hurling Final winning captain
	2011	Eoin Kelly	Mullinahone		Munster Hurling Final winning captain
	2010	Eoin Kelly	Mullinahone	All-Ireland Hurling Final winning captain	
	2009	Willie Ryan	Toomevara		Munster Hurling Final winning captain
	2008	Eoin Kelly	Mullinahone		Munster Hurling Final winning captain
	2007	Benny Dunne	Toomevara		
	2006	Lar Corbett	Thurles Sarsfields		
		Ger O'Grady	Thurles Sarsfields		
	2005	Benny Dunne	Toomevara		
	2004	Tommy Dunne	Toomevara		
	2003	Brian O'Meara	Mullinahone		
	2002	Tommy Dunne	Toomevara		
	2001	Tommy Dunne	Toomevara	All-Ireland Hurling Final winning captain	Munster Hurling Final winning captain
	2000	Tommy Dunne	Toomevara		
	1999	Tommy Dunne	Toomevara		
	1998	Declan Ryan	Clonoulty-Rossmore		
	1997	Conor Gleeson	Boherlahan-Dualla		
	1996	Michael Cleary	Nenagh Éire Óg		
	1995	Tommy Dunne	Toomevara		
	1994	George Frend	Toomevara		
	1993	Michael Cleary	Nenagh Éire Óg		
		Michael O'Meara	Toomevara		Munster Hurling Final winning captain
	1992	Colm Bonnar	Cashel King Cormac's		
	1991	Declan Carr	Holycross-Ballycahill	All-Ireland Hurling Final winning captain	Munster Hurling Final winning captain
	1990	Declan Ryan	Clonoulty-Rossmore		
	1989	Bobby Ryan	Borris-Ileigh	All-Ireland Hurling Final winning captain	Munster Hurling Final winning captain
	1988	Nicky English	Lattin-Cullen		
		Pat O'Neill	Cappawhite		Munster Hurling Final winning captain
	1987	Richard Stakelum	Borris-Ileigh		Munster Hurling Final winning captain
	1986	Tony Sheppard	Kilruane MacDonagh's		
	1985	Jack Bergin	Moycarkey-Borris		
	1984	Bobby Ryan	Borris-Ileigh		
	1983	Liam Bergin	Moycarkey-Borris		
	1982	Timmy Stapleton	Borris-Ileigh		
	1981	Peadar Quealy	Roscrea		
	1980				
	1979	Paddy Williams	Kilruane MacDonagh's		
	1978		Kilruane MacDonagh's		
	1977	Noel O'Dwyer	Borris-Ileigh		
	1976	Billy Fanning	Moneygall		
	1975	Francis Murphy	Thurles Sarsfields		
	1974	Roger Ryan	Roscrea		
	1973	Francis Loughnane	Roscrea		
	1972	Mick Cowan	Moyne-Templetuohy		
		Michael 'Babs' Keating	Ballybacon-Grange		
	1971	Tadhg O'Connor	Roscrea	All-Ireland Hurling Final winning captain	Munster Hurling Final winning captain
	1970	Francis Loughnane	Roscrea		
	1969	Francis Loughnane	Roscrea		
	1968	Mick Roche	Carrick Davins		Munster Hurling Final winning captain
	1967	Mick Roche	Carrick Davins		Munster Hurling Final winning captain
	1966	Tony Wall	Thurles Sarsfields		
	1965	Jimmy Doyle	Thurles Sarsfields	All-Ireland Hurling Final winning captain	Munster Hurling Final winning captain
	1964	Mick Murphy	Thurles Sarsfields	All-Ireland Hurling Final winning captain	Munster Hurling Final winning captain
	1963	Seán McLoughlin	Thurles Sarsfields		
	1962	Jimmy Doyle	Thurles Sarsfields	All-Ireland Hurling Final winning captain	Munster Hurling Final winning captain
	1961	Matt Hassett	Toomevara	All-Ireland Hurling Final winning captain	Munster Hurling Final winning captain
	1960	Tony Wall	Thurles Sarsfields		Munster Hurling Final winning captain
	1959	Tony Wall	Thurles Sarsfields		
	1958	Tony Wall	Thurles Sarsfields		Munster Hurling Final winning captain
	1957	Mickey Byrne	Thurles Sarsfields		
	1956	Mickey Byrne	Thurles Sarsfields		
	1955	John Doyle	Holycross-Ballycahill		
	1954	Jimmy Finn	Borris-Ileigh		
	1953	Tommy Doyle	Thurles Sarsfields		
	1952	Pat Stakelum	Holycross-Ballycahill		
	1951	Jimmy Finn	Borris-Ileigh	All-Ireland Hurling Final winning captain	Munster Hurling Final winning captain
	1950	Seán Kenny	Borris-Ileigh	All-Ireland Hurling Final winning captain	Munster Hurling Final winning captain
	1949	Pat Stakelum	Holycross-Ballycahill	All-Ireland Hurling Final winning captain	Munster Hurling Final winning captain
	1948	Willie Wall	Carrick Swans		
	1947				
	1946				
	1945	John Maher	Thurles Sarsfields	All-Ireland Hurling Final winning captain	Munster Hurling Final winning captain
	1944				
	1943				
	1942				
	1941	Johnny Ryan	Moycarkey-Borris		Munster Hurling Final winning captain
	1940	John Maher	Thurles Sarsfields		
	1939				
	1938	Paddy Ryan	Moycarkey-Borris		
	1937	Jimmy Lanigan	Thurles Sarsfields	All-Ireland Hurling Final winning captain	Munster Hurling Final winning captain
	1936				
	1935				
	1934				
	1933				
	1932				
	1931	Martin Kennedy	Toomevara		
	1930	John Joe Callinan	Thurles Sarsfields	All-Ireland Hurling Final winning captain	Munster Hurling Final winning captain
	1929				
	1928	Johnny Leahy	Boherlahan		
