= Conal Bonnar =

Irish retired hurler

Personal information
- Native name: Connall Ó Cnáimhsí (Irish)
- Born: 13 October 1969 (age 57) Cashel, County Tipperary, Ireland
- Occupation: HR manager
- Height: 5 ft 11 in (180 cm)

Sport
- Sport: Hurling
- Position: Right wing-back
Club
- Years: Club
- Cashel King Cormacs
Club titles
- Tipperary titles: 1
- Munster titles: 1
College
- Years: College
- 1987-1991: University College Dublin
College titles
- Fitzgibbon titles: 0
Inter-county*
Years	County	Apps (scores)
1988-1999	Tipperary	26 (0-02)
Inter-county titles
- Munster titles: 3
- All-Irelands: 2
- NHL: 2
- All Stars: 2
- *Inter County team apps and scores correct as of 23:26, 27 March 2018.

Conal Bonnar (born 13 October 1969) is an Irish retired hurler. His league and championship career with the Tipperary senior team lasted twelve seasons from 1988 to 1999.

Bonnar first appeared for the Cashel King Cormacs club at juvenile and underage levels, before eventually joining the club's senior team. The highlight of his club career came in 1991 when he won a Munster medal, having earlier won a county championship medal.

Bonnar made his debut on the inter-county scene when he was selected for the Tipperary minor team in 1986. He enjoyed one championship seasons with the minor team, however, he ended his tenure in this grade as an All-Ireland runner-up. Bonnar subsequently joined the under-21 team, winning an All-Ireland medal in 1989. By this stage he had also joined the Tipperary senior team after being drafted onto the panel for the 1988 All-Ireland final. Over the course of the following twelve seasons Bonnar enjoyed much success, culminating with the winning of All-Ireland medals in 1989 and 1991. He also won three Munster medals and two National League medals. He played his last game for Tipperary in June 1999. Bonnar was joined on the Tipperary team for much of his career by his brothers Colm and Cormac.

After being chosen on the Munster inter-provincial team for the first time in 1989, Bonnar made just one further appearance on the team and ended his career without a Railway Cup medal.

== Honours ==
=== Team ===
Cashel King Cormacs

- Munster Senior Club Hurling Championship (1): 1991
- Tipperary Senior Hurling Championship (1): 1991

Tipperary

- All-Ireland Senior Hurling Championship (2): 1989 (c), 1991
- Munster Senior Hurling Championship (3): 1989 (c), 1991, 1993
- National Hurling League (2): 1987-88, 1993-94
- All-Ireland Under-21 Hurling Championship (1): 1989
- Munster Under-21 Hurling Championship (1): 1989
- Munster Minor Hurling Championship (1): 1987

=== Individual ===
Awards

- All Stars Awards (2): 1989, 1991
