= Declan Ryan (hurler) =

Irish hurler (born 1968)

Personal information
- Native name: Déaglán Ó Riain (Irish)
- Born: 25 July 1968 (age 58) Clonoulty, County Tipperary, Ireland
- Occupation: Sales manager
- Height: 6 ft 1 in (185 cm)

Sport
- Sport: Hurling
- Position: Centre-forward
Club
- Years: Club
- 1986–2006: Clonoulty–Rossmore
Club titles
- Tipperary titles: 2
Inter-county
Years	County	Apps (scores)
1988–2001	Tipperary	41 (9–64)
Inter-county titles
- Munster titles: 5
- All-Irelands: 3
- NHL: 4
- All Stars: 2

Declan Ryan (born 25 March 1968) is an Irish former hurler and team manager with Tipperary.

Regarded as one of his county's greatest hurling servants, Ryan joined the team during the 1988 championship and was a regular member of the team until his retirement after the 2001 championship. During that time he won three All-Ireland medals, five Munster medals and four National Hurling League medals. He has ended up as an All-Ireland runner-up on two occasions. He is the father of two male kids, named, Jack and Tommy At club level Ryan is a two-time county club championship medalist with Clonoulty–Rossmore.

In retirement from playing Ryan became involved in team management. He guided the Tipperary minor hurling team to a second consecutive All-Ireland title in 2007 before later winning back-to-back Munster titles with the Tipperary senior hurling team. An All-Ireland title eluded the team and Ryan stepped down as manager after two years in September 2012.

== Playing career ==
=== Club ===
Ryan played his club hurling with the Clonoulty–Rossmore club and enjoyed much success in a career that spanned three decades.

After coming to prominence as an under-age player Ryan later established himself on the club's senior team. In 1989 Clonoulty–Rossmore qualified for the final of county senior championship for the first time in 101 years. Reigning champions Loughmore–Castleiney provided the opposition on that occasion, however, history was on the side of Ryan and his club. A narrow 1–-11 to 1–9 score line gave Clonoulty–Rossmore a county title.

It was 1997 before Ryan lined out in his second county championship decider. Mullinahone were the opposition on that occasion, however, Clonoulty proved too strong once again. A 0–17 to 1–12 score line gave Ryan a second county title to add to his collection.

In 1998 Clonoulty–Rossmore were given the opportunity to make history by retaining their championship title when the club qualified for the county final once again. Toomevara were the opponents on that occasion and a close game developed. A 0–16 to 1–10 score line resulted in defeat for Ryan's side.

=== Minor and under-21 ===
Ryan first came to prominence on the inter-county scene as dual player with the Tipperary minor teams in the mid-1980s. In 1986 his inter-county career nearly ended before it began in a Munster minor hurling championship game against Cork. Ryan, while lying on the ground, was struck in the face by a wild pull and received multiple stitches.

It was as a member of the Tipperary under-21 hurling team that Ryan enjoyed his first major success. In 1989 he was captain of the team that defeated Limerick by 5–16 to 1–16 to take the Munster title. Tipperary later had a 4–10 to 3–11 victory over Offaly to take the All-Ireland title.

=== Senior ===
By this stage Ryan was already a key feature on the Tipperary senior panel. He made his debut in 1988 at a time when Tipperary's star was rising. The year began well for Ryan as he captured a National Hurling League winners' medal following a 3–15 to 2–9 defeat of Offaly. He later captured his first Munster winners' medal at senior level following a 2–19 to 1–13 victory over Cork. The subsequent All-Ireland final pitted Tipperary against reigning champions Galway. A 1–15 to 0–14 score line resulted in victory for Galway and defeat for Ryan. In spite of this disappointment he finished off his debut season by receiving his first All-Star award.

In 1989 Tipperary were still the best team in Munster and Ryan won his second provincial title in-a-row after a 0–26 to 2–8 trouncing of Waterford. The All-Ireland final saw Tipperary face surprise semi-final winners Antrim. It was an historic occasion as it was only the second appearance of an Ulster team in the championship decider. Antrim's relative inexperience robbed the final of any real element of contest and Tipp romped home to a 4–24 to 3–9 win, courtesy of a star performance by Nicky English. Because of this Tipp preserved their record of being the only team to win an All-Ireland title in every decade in GAA history. It was Ryan's first senior All-Ireland winners' medal.

After surrendering their provincial and All-Ireland titles in 1990, Tipp returned the following year to defeat Cork in a thrilling Munster final replay. It was Ryan's third provincial winners' medal. The subsequent All-Ireland final saw Tipp take on Kilkenny for the first time in twenty years. A freak goal by Michael Cleary in the first-half gave Tipp a lead which they never surrendered. A 1–16 to 0–15 victory allowed Ryan to capture his second All-Ireland winners' medal in three years.

1992 saw Tipp exit the championship at an early stage, however, the team bounced back for one last hurrah in 1993. That year Ryan added a fourth Munster winners' medal to his collection as Tipp trounced Clare by 3–27 to 2–12. The subsequent All-Ireland semi-final saw Tipp renew their rivalry with Galway; however, on this occasion Galway took the spoils. This defeat brought the curtain down on Tipp's great revival, however, Ryan did collect a second National League title in 1994.

The next few years saw Limerick and Clare dominate the provincial series of games. After defeat after a draw and a replay in the Munster final of 1996, Ryan lined out in the provincial decider again in 1997. Clare provided the opposition on that occasion, however, it was an occasion to forget for Ryan as Tipp lost a close and exciting game by 1–18 to 0–18. The introduction of the new 'back-door' system resulted in both Clare and Tipperary meeting for the second time in the first all-Munster All-Ireland final. The game itself was one of the best of the decade. Clare were well on top for much of the game, however, Liam Cahill and Eugene O'Neill scored twice for Tipp in the last ten minutes. John Leahy missed a goal chance in the last minute while another Tipp point was controversially ruled wide. At the full-time whistle Clare had won by a single point by 0–20 to 2–13.

Ryan added a third National League medal to his collection in 1999; however, further success in the championship still eluded him with provincial final defeat again in 2000.

In 2001 Tipp made a third consecutive appearance in the National League final. After one victory and one defeat Ryan's side were successful again and defeated Clare by 1–19 to 0–17. It was Ryan's fourth and final winners' medal in that competition. Later in the championship Tipp defeated Limerick by 2–16 to 1–17, giving Ryan a fifth Munster winners' medal. After a draw and a replay against Wexford Ryan later lined out in Croke Park in a fifth All-Ireland final. Old rivals Galway provided the opposition on that occasion; however, two goals by Tipp's Mark O'Leary gave the Munster men the threshold to withstand a Galway comeback. With nine minutes to go Ryan's side only led by one point, however, Tipperary outscored Galway by five to three in those closing minutes. At the final whistle Tipperary were the winners by 2–18 to 2–15. Not only did Ryan collect his third All-Ireland winners' medal but he also joined an exclusive club of players to have won championship titles in three separate decades. Following this victory he retired from inter-county hurling.

=== Inter-provincial ===
Ryan also lined out with Munster in the inter-provincial series of games. He won his sole Railway Cup medal in 1996 following a 2–20 to 0–10 trouncing of Leinster.

== Management career ==
=== Tipperary minor hurling manager ===
In October 2006 Ryan took over from Liam Sheedy as manager of the Tipperary Minor hurling team. In his first year in charge Tipperary won the Munster Minor Hurling Championship with a 0–18 to 1–11 win against Cork in the final. Tipperary went all the way to the All Ireland minor final after a 1–19 to 2–12 win against Kilkenny in the semi-final, which was followed by a 3–14 to 2–11 win again against Cork in the final. In 2008, Tipperary reached the Munster final against Cork but were defeated by 0–19 to 0–18. They went on to reach the All Ireland Minor semi final where they lost to Kilkenny by 1–14 to 3–17. Ryan was succeeded as Minor hurling manager by Mark O'Leary in 2009.

=== Tipperary senior hurling manager ===
On 9 November 2010, Ryan was appointed as the Tipperary Senior hurling manager on a two-year term, succeeding Liam Sheedy. He will be joined by Tommy Dunne as the new team coach, with Michael Gleeson of Tipperary county champions Thurles Sarsfields completing the new Tipperary hurling management team. Ryan's first game in charge was in January 2011 in the 2011 Waterford Crystal Cup against WIT where Tipperary were defeated by a scoreline of 2–17 to 1–19 in Clonmel. His first league game in charge took place on 12 February 2011 against Kilkenny, in a 1–10 to 1–17 defeat at Semple Stadium. His first league win came in the third round on 5 March 2011 against Waterford by 1–20 to 0–18 under the floodlights at Semple Stadium. On 29 May 2011 in Ryan's first Championship game as manager, Tipperary defeated Cork by 3–22 to 0–23 at Semple Stadium. On 10 July 2011, in his first Munster Final as manager, Tipperary defeated Waterford by 7–19 to 0–19 at Páirc Uí Chaoimh. Ryan guided Tipperary past Dublin in the semi-final to meet Kilkenny in the 2011 All-Ireland Senior Hurling Championship Final where they were defeated by 2–17 to 1–16.

In March 2012, Ryan managed Tipperary to their first trophy of the year by winning the Waterford Crystal Cup against Clare in Sixmilebridge by 1–21 to 2–12. In July 2012, Tipperary retained the Munster title with a 2–17 to 0–16 win against Waterford in the Final. In August 2012, Ryan managed Tipperary to their heaviest defeat in the All-Ireland Senior Hurling Championship since 1897, with Kilkenny blowing them away by scoring 4–24, 3–15 in the second half to leave Tipperary with an eighteen-point defeat. In early September 2012, Ryan and his management team of Tommy Dunne and Michael Gleeson informed the county board that they would not seek an extension to their two-year term in charge of the Senior hurling team and would be stepping down.

== Honours ==
=== Team ===
Clonoulty–Rossmore

- Tipperary Senior Club Hurling Championship (2): 1989, 1997

Tipperary

- All-Ireland Senior Hurling Championship (3): 1989, 1991, 2001
- Munster Senior Hurling Championship (5): 1988, 1989, 1991, 1993, 2001
- National Hurling League (4): 1987–88, 1993–94, 1999, 2001
- All-Ireland Under-21 Hurling Championship (1): 1989
- Munster Under-21 Hurling Championship (1): 1989

Munster

- Railway Cup (1): 1996

=== Manager ===
Tipperary

- Munster Senior Hurling Championship (2): 2011, 2012
- Waterford Crystal Cup (1): 2012
- All-Ireland Minor Hurling Championship (1): 2007
- Munster Minor Hurling Championship (1): 2007

Sporting positions
Preceded by Bobby Ryan	Tipperary Senior Hurling Captain; 1990	Succeeded by Declan Carr
Preceded by Conor Gleeson	Tipperary Senior Hurling Captain; 1998	Succeeded by Tommy Dunne
Preceded by Liam Sheedy	Tipperary Minor Hurling Manager; 2007–2008	Succeeded by Mark O'Leary
Preceded by Liam Sheedy	Tipperary Senior Hurling Manager; 2010–2012	Succeeded by Eamon O'Shea
Achievements
Preceded by Christy Connery (Cork)	All-Ireland Under-21 Hurling Final winning captain 1989	Succeeded by Jamesie Brennan (Kilkenny)
