= Bobby Ryan (hurler) =

Tipperary hurler (born 1961)

Personal information
- Native name: Roibeard Ó Riain (Irish)
- Born: Robert Ryan; 23 October 1961 (age 65) Borrisoleigh, County Tipperary, Ireland
- Occupation: Farmer
- Height: 5 ft 10 in (178 cm)

Sport
- Sport: Hurling
- Position: Centre-back
Club
- Years: Club
- 1978–1996: Borris–Ileigh
Club titles
- Tipperary titles: 3
- Munster titles: 1
- All-Ireland Titles: 1
Inter-county*
Years	County	Apps (scores)
1980–1993	Tipperary	37 (1–05)
Inter-county titles
- Munster titles: 5
- All-Irelands: 2
- NHL: 1
- All Stars: 3
- *Inter County team apps and scores correct as of 21:26, 27 March 2018.

Robert Ryan (born 23 October 1961) is an Irish former hurler. At club level he played with Borris-Ileigh and at inter-county level was a member of the Tipperary senior hurling team. Ryan captained Tipperary to the All-Ireland SHC title in 1989.

== Early life ==
Born in Borrisoleigh, County Tipperary, Ryan was raised in a family that had a longstanding association with hurling. His father, Tim Ryan, and his uncles, Ned Ryan and Pat Stakelum, won All-Ireland SHC medals with Tipperary between 1949 and 1951. Ryan attended Templemore CBS and was part of the school's senior hurling team that beat St Flannan's College to win the Dr Harty Cup title in 1978. He later claimed an All-Ireland Colleges SHC medal after a 2-11 to 1-04 win over St Peter's College in the final.

== Club career ==
Ryan began his career at juvenile and underage levels with the Borris-Ileigh club before eventually progressing to adult level in 1978 as a member of the club's junior team. He claimed his first silverware in 1981 when Borris-Ileigh beat Roscrea by 1-14 to 0-12 to claim their first Tipperary SHC title in nearly 30 years. Ryan collected a second winners' medal in 1983 when Borris-Ileigh reclaimed the title after a 0-17 to 1-11 defeat of Loughmore–Castleiney.

After a three year hiatus, Borris-Ileigh were back as Tipperary SHC winners in 1986 with Ryan collecting a third winners' medal after the 0-14 to 0-07 win over Kilruane MacDonaghs. He later added a Munster Club SHC medal to his collection after Borris-Ileigh beat Clarecastle to claim their inaugural provincial title. Ryan was at left wing-back when Borris-Ileigh subsequently defeated Rathnure by 2-09 to 0-09 in the 1987 All-Ireland club final.

== Inter-county career ==
Ryan began his inter-county career with Tipperary during a two-year tenure at minor level in 1978 and 1979. He immediately progressed to the under-21 team in 1980 and ended his debut season in that grade with an All-Ireland U21HC medal after a 2-09 to 0-14 win over Kilkenny in the final. It was the first of two consecutive winners' medals for Ryan, as he was also involved when Kilkenny were once again beaten in 1981.

Ryan joined the senior team during the 1980-81 National League campaign. Tipperary hurling was going through a barren period for the first few years of Ryan's senior career, however, he won an All-Star award in 1986. Ryan won his first Munster SHC medal after a 4-22 to 1-22 extra-time defeat of Cork in 1987. He added a National Hurling League medal and a second consecutive Munster SHC medal to his collection the following year. Ryan later lined out at wing-back in the 1-15 to 0-14 defeat by Galway in the 1988 All-Ireland final. He ended the season with a second All-Star award.

Ryan was appointed team captain in 1989 and claimed a third successive Munster SHC medal that year. He later won his first All-Ireland SHC medal after captaining the team from centre-back to a 4-24 to 3-09 defeat of Antrim in the 1989 All-Ireland final. Fox ended the season with his third All-Star award in four years.

After surrendering their titles in 1990, Ryan won a fourth Munster SHC medal in five seasons after a 4-19 to 4-15 defeat of Cork. He later claimed a second All-Ireland SHC medal after again lining out at centre-back in the 1-16 to 0-15 defeat of Kilkenny in the 1991 All-Ireland final. His brother, Aidan, lined out at midfield in the victory. Ryan won a fifth and final Munster SHC medal in 1993. He retired from inter-county hurling following Tipperary's defeat by Galway in the 1993 All-Ireland semi-final.

== Inter-provincial career ==
Ryan's performances at inter-county level resulted in his selection for Munster in four Railway Cup campaigns between 1984 and 1991. He claimed his first winners' medal in 1984 after Munster's 1-18 to 2-09 win over Leinster, before winning a second Railway Cup title in 1985.

== Honours ==
Templemore CBS

- Dr Croke Cup: 1978
- Dr Harty Cup: 1978

Borris–Ileigh

- All-Ireland Senior Club Hurling Championship: 1987
- Munster Senior Club Hurling Championship: 1986
- Tipperary Senior Hurling Championship: 1981, 1983, 1986
- North Tipperary Senior Hurling Championship: 1981, 1983, 1988

Tipperary

- All-Ireland Senior Hurling Championship: 1989 (c), 1991
- Munster Senior Hurling Championship: 1987, 1988, 1989 (c), 1991, 1993
- National Hurling League: 1987-88
- All-Ireland Under-21 Hurling Championship: 1980, 1981
- Munster Under-21 Hurling Championship: 1980, 1981

Munster

- Railway Cup: 1984, 1985, 1992

Awards

- All Stars Awards: 1986, 1988, 1989

Sporting positions
Preceded by Liam Bergin	Tipperary senior hurling team captain 1984	Succeeded by Jack Bergin
Preceded by Nicky English	Tipperary senior hurling team captain 1989	Succeeded by Declan Ryan
Achievements
Preceded by Conor Hayes	All-Ireland SHC final winning captain 1989	Succeeded by Tomás Mulcahy
