= Conor O'Donovan =

Irish hurler

Conor Matthew O'Donovan
Personal information
- Native name: Conchur Ó Donnabháin (Irish)
- Born: 1962 (age 63–64) Effin, County Limerick, Ireland
- Occupation: Bank official
- Height: 6 ft 1 in (185 cm)

Sport
- Sport: Hurling
- Position: Centre-back
Club
- Years: Club
- Nenagh Éire Óg
Club titles
- Tipperary titles: 1
Inter-county*
Years	County	Apps (scores)
1984-1991	Tipperary	15 (0-00)
Inter-county titles
- Munster titles: 4
- All-Irelands: 2
- NHL: 1
- All Stars: 0
- *Inter County team apps and scores correct as of 22:57, 27 March 2018.

Conor Matthew O'Donovan (born 7 February 1962) is an Irish retired hurler. His league and championship career with the Tipperary senior team lasted seven seasons from 1984 to 1991.

Born in Effin, County Limerick, O'Donovan was raised in a strong hurling family. His uncle, Terry Moloney, was an All-Ireland runner-up with Tipperary in 1960.

O'Donovan first played competitive hurling with the Effin club at juvenile and underage levels. After transferring to the Nenagh Éire Óg club, he immediately became a member of the club's senior team. The highlight of his club career came in 1995 when he won a county championship medal as captain.

O'Donovan made his debut on the inter-county scene when he was selected for the Limerick minor team. He enjoyed one championship season with the minor team before subsequently joining the Tipperary under-21 team. O'Donovan later joined the Tipperary senior team, making his debut during the 1984-85 league. Over the course of the following six seasons he enjoyed much success, culminating with the winning of an All-Ireland medals in 1989 and 1990. O'Donovan also won four Munster medals and one National League medal.

After being chosen on the Munster inter-provincial team for the first time in 1987, O'Donovan was an automatic choice on the starting fifteen for the following three years. He ended his career without a Railway Cup medal.

== Honours ==
Nenagh Éire Óg

- Tipperary Senior Hurling Championship (1): 1995 (c)

Tipperary

- All-Ireland Senior Hurling Championship (2): 1989 (c), 1991
- Munster Senior Hurling Championship (4): 1987, 1988, 1989, 1991
- National Hurling League (1): 1987-88
