= Cormac Bonnar =

Irish retired hurler

Personal information
- Native name: Cormac Ó Cnáimhsí (Irish)
- Nickname: The Viking
- Born: 31 May 1959 (age 67) Borrisoleigh, County Tipperary, Ireland
- Occupation: Retired secondary school principal
- Height: 6 ft 1 in (185 cm)

Sport
- Sport: Hurling
- Position: Full-forward
Clubs
- Years: Club
- Cashel King Cormacs; St Patrick's; Dr Crokes
Club titles
- Tipperary titles: 1
- Munster titles: 1
College
- Years: College
- University College Dublin
Inter-county*
Years	County	Apps (scores)
1981–1992	Tipperary	16 (3-06)
Inter-county titles
- Munster titles: 4
- All-Irelands: 2
- NHL: 1
- All Stars: 2
- *Inter County team apps and scores correct as of 00:26, 28 March 2018.

Cormac Bonnar (born 31 May 1959) is an Irish retired hurler. His league and championship career with the Tipperary senior team spanned twelve seasons from 1980 to 1992.

Bonnar first appeared for the Cashel King Cormacs club at juvenile and underage levels, before eventually joining the club's senior team. The highlight of his club career came in 1991 when he won a Munster medal, having earlier won a county championship medal. Bonnar later played with St Patrick's and Dr Crokes.

Bonnar made his debut on the inter-county scene when he was selected for the Tipperary minor team. He enjoyed one unsuccessful championship season with the minor team before subsequently becoming a dual player at under-21 level. With the under-21 hurling team he won back-to-back All-Ireland medals in 1979 and 1980. Bonnar subsequently made his senior debut during the 1980–81 league. Over the course of the following twelve seasons, he won All-Ireland medals in 1989 and 1991. Bonnar also won four Munster medals and one National League medal. He played his last game for Tipperary in June 1992, however, he returned to the Tipperary intermediate team for one season in 1997. Bonnar was joined on the Tipperary team for much of his career by his brothers Colm and Conal.

After being chosen on the Munster inter-provincial team for the first time in 1989, Bonnar made just one further appearance on the team in 1991 and ended his career without a Railway Cup medal.

== Honours ==
=== Team ===
Cashel King Cormacs

- Munster Senior Club Hurling Championship (1): 1991
- Tipperary Senior Hurling Championship (1): 1991

Tipperary

- All-Ireland Senior Hurling Championship (2): 1989, 1991
- Munster Senior Hurling Championship (4): 1987, 1988, 1989, 1991
- National Hurling League (1): 1987–88
- All-Ireland Under-21 Hurling Championship (2): 1979, 1980
- Munster Under-21 Hurling Championship (2): 1979, 1980

=== Individual ===
Awards

- All Stars Awards (2): 1989, 1991
