= Paul Delaney (hurler) =

Irish hurler

Personal information
- Native name: Pól Ó Dúláinne (Irish)
- Born: November 1966 (age 59–60) Roscrea, County Tipperary, Ireland
- Occupation: Technician
- Height: 5 ft 9 in (175 cm)

Sport
- Sport: Hurling
- Position: Right corner-back
Club
- Years: Club
- Roscrea
Club titles
- Tipperary titles: 0
Inter-county*
Years	County	Apps (scores)
1986-1997	Tipperary	26 (0-19)
Inter-county titles
- Munster titles: 5
- All-Irelands: 2
- NHL: 1
- All Stars: 1
- *Inter County team apps and scores correct as of 12:26, 28 March 2018.

Paul Delaney (born 27 November 1966) is an Irish retired hurler. His league and championship career with the Tipperary senior team spanned eleven seasons from 1986 to 1997.

Delaney first appeared for the Roscrea club at juvenile and underage levels, before eventually joining the club's senior team, however, he ended his career without a county championship medal.

Delaney made his debut on the inter-county scene when he was selected for the Tipperary minor team in 1984. He enjoyed one unsuccessful championship seasons with the minor team before subsequently joining the under-21 team with whom he won an All-Ireland medal with in 1985. Delaney made his senior debut during the 1986-87 league. The highlight of his eleven year senior career came in 1991 when he won his sole All-Ireland medal. Delaney also won five Munster medals and one National League medal.

After being chosen on the Munster inter-provincial team for the first time in 1987, Ryan was an automatic choice on the starting fifteen for a number of years. During that time he won one Railway Cup medal.

He is a keen Manchester United supporter and has travelled to Old Trafford on many occasions.

Paul also considers himself a golfer and plays at his local club in Roscrea.

== Honours ==
Tipperary

- All-Ireland Senior Hurling Championship (2): All-Ireland Senior Hurling Championship 1989,1991.
- Munster Senior Hurling Championship (5): 1987, 1988, 1989, 1991, 1993
- National Hurling League (1): 1987-88
- All-Ireland Under-21 Hurling Championship (1): 1985
- Munster Under-21 Hurling Championship (1): 1985

Munster

- Railway Cup (1): 1992
