= Noel Sheehy =

Irish hurler

Personal information
- Born: 5 December 1964 (age 61) Nenagh, County Tipperary, Ireland
- Occupation: Bank official
- Height: 6 ft 1 in (185 cm)

Sport
- Sport: Hurling
- Position: Full-back
Club
- Years: Club
- 1981–2000: Silvermines
Club titles
- Tipperary titles: 0
Inter-county*
Years	County	Apps (scores)
1985–1997	Tipperary	29 (0-00)
Inter-county titles
- Munster titles: 5
- All-Irelands: 2
- NHL: 2
- All Stars: 2
- *Inter County team apps and scores correct as of 23:26, 27 March 2018.

Noel Sheehy (born 5 December 1964) is an Irish retired hurler. His league and championship career with the Tipperary senior team lasted twelve seasons from 1985 to 1997.

Sheehy first appeared for the Silvermines club at juvenile and underage levels, before eventually joining the club's adult team. After winning five divisional intermediate championship medals, he ended his club career by winning a county intermediate championship medal in 1999.

Sheehy made his debut on the inter-county scene when he was selected for the Tipperary minor team. He enjoyed two championship seasons with the minor team, culminating with the winning of an All-Ireland medal in 1982. Sheehy subsequently joined the under-21 team, winning an All-Ireland medal in 1985. He subsequently joined the Tipperary senior team, making his debut during the 1985–86 league. Over the course of the following twelve seasons Sheehy enjoyed much success, culminating with the winning of an All-Ireland medals in 1989 and 1991. He also won five Munster medals and two National League medals. He played his last game for Tipperary in September 1997.

After being chosen on the Munster inter-provincial team for the first time in 1988, Sheehy was an automatic choice on the starting fifteen for a number of years. He won his sole Railway Cup medal in 1992.

In retirement from playing, Sheehy became involved in team management and coaching. He served as a selector and manager with the Tipperary under-21 team in 2001 and 2002.

== Honours ==
=== Team ===
Silvermines

- Tipperary Intermediate Hurling Championship (1): 1999

Tipperary

- All-Ireland Senior Hurling Championship (2): 1989, 1991
- Munster Senior Hurling Championship (5): 1987, 1988, 1989, 1991, 1993
- National Hurling League (2): 1987–88, 1993–94
- All-Ireland Under-21 Hurling Championship (1): 1985
- Munster Under-21 Hurling Championship (1): 1985
- All-Ireland Minor Hurling Championship (1): 1982
- Munster Minor Hurling Championship (1): 1982

Munster

- Railway Cup (1): 1992

=== Individual ===
Awards

- All Stars Awards (2): 1990, 1991
