= 1987 All-Ireland Senior Club Hurling Championship final =

1987 All-Ireland Senior Club Hurling Championship Final
- Event: 1986–87 All-Ireland Senior Club Hurling Championship
Borris-Ileigh	Rathnure
2-9	0-9
- Date: 17 March 1987
- Venue: Croke Park, Dublin
- Referee: Gerry Kirwan (Offaly)
- Attendance: 9,550

The 1987 All-Ireland Senior Club Hurling Championship final was a hurling match played at Croke Park on 17 March 1987 to determine the winners of the 1986–87 All-Ireland Senior Club Hurling Championship, the 17th season of the All-Ireland Senior Club Hurling Championship, a tournament organised by the Gaelic Athletic Association for the champion clubs of the four provinces of Ireland. The final was contested by Borris-Ileigh of Tipperary and Rathnure of Wexford, with Borris-Ileigh winning by 2-9 to 0-9.

The All-Ireland final was a unique occasion as it was the first ever championship meeting between Borris-Ileigh and Rathnure. It remains their only championship meeting at this level. Both sides were hoping to make history by winning their first All-Ireland title.

Goals were key in this game with Borris-Ileigh netting two in the first half. Philip Kenny and Aidan Ryan's majors helped the North Tipperary club to a 2-9 to 0-9 victory. For Rathnure it was a fourth All-Ireland final defeat.

Borris-Ileigh's victory secured their first All-Ireland title. They became the 11th club to win the All-Ireland title, while they were the third Tipperary representatives to claim the ultimate prize.

== Match ==
=== Details ===
17 March 1989

Borris-Ileigh	2-9 - 0-9	O'Donovan Rossa
A Ryan 1-2, P Kenny 1-1, N O'Dwyer 0-4 (3f), J McGrath 0-1, C Stakelum 0-1.		J Holohan 0-3 (3f), J Murphy 0-3, M Morrissey 0-1, J Redmond 0-1, N Hearne 0-1.

Croke Park, Dublin
Attendance: 9,550
Referee: G Kirwan (Offaly)

Borris-Ileigh	Rathnure
