= Philip Maher =

Irish hurler

Personal information
- Nickname: Philly
- Born: 14 December 1979 (age 46) Borrisoleigh, County Tipperary
- Height: 6 ft 2 in (188 cm)

Sport
- Sport: Hurling
- Position: Full-back
Club
- Years: Club
- Borrisoleigh
Inter-county
| Years | County | Apps (scores) |
| 2000–2007 | Tipperary | 25 (0-0) |
Inter-county titles
- Munster titles: 1
- All-Irelands: 1
- NHL: 1
- All Stars: 1

Philip Maher (born 14 December 1979) is an Irish hurler. He plays in the full-back position on the Tipperary senior hurling team.

== Club career ==
Philip Maher was born in Borrisoleigh, County Tipperary in 1979. He showed great skill as a hurler in his youth and quickly started playing with his local club in Borrisoleigh before he was spotted by the Tipperary inter-county selectors.

== Playing career ==
=== Club ===
Maher plays his club hurling with the famous Borrisoleigh club in Tipperary.

=== Inter-county ===
By the late 1990s Maher had made his debut with the Tipperary minor hurling team. He won a Munster minor hurling medal in 1997 and quickly moved on to the inter-county under-21 team. On that team he won another Munster title, however, All-Ireland success still eluded him. In 2000 Maher made his senior debut for Tipperary in a Munster Championship game against Waterford. The following year he won his first National Hurling League medal before later winning a Munster title. The year was rounded off when Maher won his first All-Ireland medal following a victory over Galway. His performance in the championship earned him his first All-Star award. The subsequent few years proved frustrating for Maher as Tipp failed to win any further Munster of All-Ireland titles.
