= Jack Bergin =

Irish hurler

Personal information
- Native name: Seán Ó Beirgin (Irish)
- Born: 1954 (age 71–72) Littleton, County Tipperary, Ireland

Sport
- Sport: Hurling
- Position: Right corner-back
Club
- Years: Club
- Moycarkey–Borris
Club titles
- Tipperary titles: 2
- Munster titles: 1
Inter-county*
Years	County	Apps (scores)
1974-1986	Tipperary	5 (0-00)
Inter-county titles
- Munster titles: 0
- All-Irelands: 0
- NHL: 0
- All Stars: 0
- *Inter County team apps and scores correct as of 16:52, 24 December 2013.

Jack Bergin (born 1954) is an Irish retired hurler who played as a right corner-back for the Tipperary senior team.

Born in Littleton, County Tipperary, Bergin first arrived on the inter-county scene at the age of twenty when he first linked up with the Tipperary under-21 team. He joined the senior panel during the 1974 championship. Bergin went on to play a bit part for over a decade, however, he ended his career without any silverware.

At club level Bergin is a one-time Munster medallist with Moycarkey–Borris. In addition to this he also won two championship medals.

His brother, Liam also played with Tipperary, while his nephew, Kieran, is a current member of the Tipperary team.

Throughout his career Bergin made 5 championship appearances. He retired from inter-county hurling following the conclusion of the 1986 championship.

In retirement from playing Bergin has become involved in team management and coaching. As a selector with the Tipperary senior team between 1998 and 2005 he helped the team to All-Ireland, Munster and National League honours.

== Honours ==
=== Player ===
Moycarkey–Borris

- Munster Senior Club Hurling Championship (1): 1982
- Tipperary Senior Hurling Championship (2): 1982, 1984

=== Selector ===
Tipperary

- All-Ireland Senior Hurling Championship (1): 2001
- Munster Senior Hurling Championship (1): 2001
- National Hurling League (2): 1999, 2001

Sporting positions
Preceded by Bobby Ryan	Tipperary Senior Hurling Captain; 1985	Succeeded by Tony Sheppard
