= Mark O'Leary (hurler) =

Irish hurler

Personal information
- Native name: Marc Ó Laoire (Irish)
- Born: 1977 (age 48–49) Kilruane, County Tipperary, Ireland
- Occupation: I.T. consultant
- Height: 6 ft 0 in (183 cm)

Sport
- Sport: Hurling
- Position: Right wing-forward
Club
- Years: Club
- Kilruane MacDonagh's
Club titles
- Tipperary titles: 0
Inter-county
- Years: County
- 1999-2005: Tipperary
Inter-county titles
- Munster titles: 1
- All-Irelands: 1
- NHL: 1
- All Stars: 1

Mark O'Leary (born 1977) is an Irish hurler who played as a right wing-forward for the Tipperary senior team.

O'Leary joined the team during the 1999 championship and was a regular member of the team until his retirement after the 2005 championship. During that time he won one All-Ireland winners' medal, one Munster winners' medal and two National Hurling League winners' medals (1999, 2001).

At club level O'Leary continued to play with Kilruane MacDonagh's.

O'Leary is a former manager of the Tipperary minor hurling team.

Sporting positions
Preceded by Declan Ryan	Tipperary Minor Hurling Manager; 2009-2011	Succeeded by Raymie Ryan
