= Kieran Carey =

Irish hurler (1933–2007)

Personal information
- Native name: Ciarán Ó Ciardha (Irish)
- Born: 24 April 1933 Knock, County Laois, Ireland
- Died: 30 May 2007 (aged 74) Roscrea, County Tipperary, Ireland

Sport
- Sport: Hurling
- Position: Left corner-back
Clubs
- Years: Club
- Kyle; Roscrea
Club titles
- Tipperary titles: 4
- Munster titles: 2
- All-Ireland Titles: 1
Inter-county*
Years	County	Apps (scores)
1957–1967	Tipperary	29 (0-00)
Inter-county titles
- Munster titles: 7
- All-Irelands: 5
- NHL: 5
- *Inter County team apps and scores correct as of 14:36, 30 August 2014.

Kieran Carey (24 April 1933 – 30 May 2007) was an Irish hurler who played as a left corner-back for the Tipperary senior team.

Born in Garron Borris in Ossory, County Laois in 1933 a townland on the outskirts of his native village of Knock in County Tipperary. Kieran Carey first arrived on the inter-county scene at the age of twenty-five when he first linked up with the Tipperary senior team. He made his senior debut in the 1957–58 National League. Carey went on to play a key role for Tipperary as part of the so-called "Hell's Kitchen" full-back line, and won five All-Ireland medals, seven Munster medals and five National Hurling League medals. He was an All-Ireland runner-up on two occasions.

As a member of the Munster inter-provincial team on a number of occasions, Carey won several Railway Cup medals as a non-playing substitute. At club level he was a one-time All-Ireland medallist with Roscrea. In addition to this he also won two Munster medals and four championship medals. Carey also won a championship medal with Kyle.

Throughout his career Carey made 29 championship appearances. His retirement came following Tipperary's defeat by Kilkenny in the 1967 championship.

In retirement from playing Carey became involved in team management and coaching, serving as a selector with the Tipperary senior team.

== Playing career ==
=== Club ===
Carey began his club hurling career with Kyle. He was just out of the minor grade when the club qualified for the 1951 senior decider, which was delayed until the following year A three-point victory gave Carey a championship medal.

Shortly after this victory Carey joined the Roscrea club after moving to the town in an effort to find work. In 1968 he was in the twilight of his career when Roscrea enjoyed a brief period of success. A 2–13 to 3–4 of Thurles Sarsfields gave him his first championship medal.

Roscrea retained their championship crown in 1969, with Carey collecting a second championship medal following a 4–13 to 0–5 trouncing of Carrick Davins. He later won a Munster medal following a narrow 3–6 to 1–9 defeat of Glen Rovers.

In 1970 Roscrea made it three championships in-a-row following a 3–11 to 2–12 defeat of Thurles Sarsfields. Carey later won a second Munster medal as Clarecastle were heavily defeated by 4–11 to 1–6. On 19 December 1971 Roscrea faced St. Rynagh's in the inaugural All-Ireland cub decider. Goals proved the key for Roscrea as two solo-run goals from Joe Cunningham and Joe Tynan helped the club to a 5–5 to 2–5 victory. The victory gave thirty-eight-year-old Carey an All-Ireland Senior Club Hurling Championship medal.

Four-in-a-row proved beyond Roscrea, however, the club bounced back in 1972. A 5–8 to 3–6 defeat of Borris-Ileigh gave Carey a fourth and final championship medal.

=== Inter-county ===
==== Beginnings ====
On 1 June 1958 Carey made his senior championship debut in a 2–10 to 1–5 Munster quarter-final defeat of Limerick. He later won his first Munster medal following a 4–12 to 1–5 trouncing of reigning champions Waterford. Tipp later defeated Kilkenny in the All-Ireland semi-final before lining out against Galway in the All-Ireland decider on 7 September 1958. Galway got a bye into the final without picking up a hurley. Liam Devaney, Donie Nealon and Larry Keane all scored goals for Tipperary in the first-half, while Tony Wall sent a seventy-yard free untouched to the Galway net. Tipperary won the game by 4–9 to 2–5 giving Carey his first All-Ireland medal in his debut season.

Carey won his first National League medal in 1959 following a 0–15 to 0–7 defeat of Waterford, however, Tipperary subsequently surrendered their provincial and All-Ireland crowns.

Tipperary asserted their dominance in 1960 by retaining the National League title with a 2–15 to 3–8 defeat of Cork. It was Carey's second winners' medal in that competition. He later won a second Munster medal following a narrow 4–13 to 4–11 defeat of Cork in what has been described as the toughest game of hurling ever played. This victory allowed Tipperary to advance directly to an All-Ireland final meeting with Wexford on 4 September 1960. A certain amount of over-confidence was obvious in the Tipperary camp, particularly in trainer Phil Purcell's comment that no player was capable of marking star forward Jimmy Doyle. The game ended in remarkable circumstances as the crowd invaded the pitch with a minute to go, mistaking the referee's whistle for the end of the game. When the crowd were finally moved off the pitch Tipperary continued playing with only twelve men, but Wexford won on a score line of 2–15 to 0–11. It was Carey's first All-Ireland defeat.

==== Total dominance ====
1961 saw Doyle collect a third National League medal following a 6–6 to 4–9 defeat of Waterford. He later added a third Munster medal to his collection, as old rivals Cork were downed by 3–6 to 0–7. The absence of the All-Ireland semi-final allowed Tipperary to advance directly to the final itself, with Dublin's first native hurling team providing the opposition on 3 September 1961. The game was a close run thing, however, Tipperary held on to win by 0–16 to 1–12. It was Carey's second All-Ireland medal.

In 1962 Tipperary were still the kingpins of Munster. A 5–14 to 2–3 trouncing of Waterford in the decider gave Carey a fourth Munster medal. Tipperary's nemesis of two years earlier, Wexford, waited in Croke Park to test them once again in the subsequent All-Ireland final on 2 September 1962. Wexford, however, were not the force of old and the side got off to possibly the worst start ever by a team in a championship decider. After just ninety seconds the Leinster champions were down by two goals, however, the game turned out to be much closer than people expected. Tipperary eventually secured the win on a score line of 3–10 to 2–11, giving Carey a third All-Ireland medal.

After losing the following year's Munster final to Waterford in one of the hurling shocks of the decade, Tipperary bounced back in 1964 with Carey collecting a fourth National League medal. Tipperary later cantered casually past Cork by fourteen points in the provincial decider, giving Carey a fifth Munster medal. The All-Ireland final on 6 September 1964 saw Kilkenny enter the game as firm favourites against Tipperary. John "Mackey" McKenna scored Tipp's first goal after ten minutes as the Munster champions took a 1–8 to 0–6 interval lead. The second half saw Tipperary score goals for fun, with Donie Nealon getting a hat-trick and Seán McLoughlin another. Kilkenny were humiliated at the full-time whistle as Tipperary triumphed by 5–13 to 2–8. It was Carey's fourth All-Ireland medal.

In 1965 Carey won a fifth and final National League medal as New York were narrowly defeated on an aggregate score of 6–19 to 5–20. Tipperary demolished all opposition in the provincial championship once again and a 4–11 to 0–5 trouncing of Cork gave Carey a sixth Munster medal. Wexford were Tipperary's opponents in the subsequent All-Ireland final on 5 September 1965, however, the game failed to live up to the two classic games between the two sides in 1960 and 1962. Victory went to Tipperary on that occasion by 2–16 to 0–10, courtesy of a brace of goals by Seán McLoughlin. The win gave Carey a fifth All-Ireland medal.

==== Decline ====
After surrendering their provincial crown in 1966, Tipperary bounced back the following year, with Carey winning a seventh Munster medal following a 4–12 to 2–6 defeat of Clare. 3 September 1967 saw Kilkenny face Tipperary in the All-Ireland decider. Tipp looked like continuing their hoodoo over their near rivals as they took a 2–6 to 1–3 lead at half-time. Goalkeeper Ollie Walsh was the hero for Kilkenny as he made a series of spectacular saves, however, the team lost Eddie Keher and Tom Walsh to injury in the second half. In spite of this, Kilkenny laid to rest a bogey that Tipperary had over the team since 1922, and a 3–8 to 2–7 victory resulted in defeat for Carey's team. The defeat brought the curtain down on Carey's inter-county career.

=== Inter-provincial ===
Carey was first picked for the Munster inter-provincial team in 1959 as a member of the extended panel. He won his first Railway Cup medal that year, albeit as a non-playing substitute, as Munster trounced Connacht by 7–11 to 2–6. It was the first of three successive winners' medals in that competition for Carey, however, they were all claimed from the substitutes' bench.

In 1962 Carey was at left corner-back as Munster qualified for yet another Railway Cup decider. Leinster were narrowly triumphant on that occasion by 1–11 to 1–9.

Carey was once again dropped from the starting fifteen in 1963, however, he won a fourth Railway Cup medal as a non-playing sub as Munster narrowly defeated Leinster in a replay.

After a on-year absence Carey was added to the starting fifteen again in 1965, however, in a similar pattern to previous years Munster were heavily defeated by Leinster.

Carey won his fifth and final Railway Cup medal as a non-playing substitute in 1965 as Munster accounted for their old rivals Leinster by 3–13 to 3–11.

== Honours ==
=== Player ===
Kyle

- Laois Senior Hurling Championship (1): 1951

Roscrea

- All-Ireland Senior Club Hurling Championship (1): 1971
- Munster Senior Club Hurling Championship (2): 1969, 1970
- Tipperary Senior Hurling Championship (4): 1968, 1969, 1970, 1972

Tipperary

- All-Ireland Senior Hurling Championship (5): 1958, 1961, 1962, 1964, 1965
- Munster Senior Hurling Championship (7): 1958, 1960, 1961, 1962, 1964, 1965, 1967
- National Hurling League (5): 1958–59, 1959–60, 1960–61, 1963–64, 1964–65
- Oireachtas Tournament (5): 1960, 1961, 1963, 1964, 1965

Munster

- Railway Cup (5): 1959 (sub), 1960 (sub), 1961 (sub), 1963 (sub), 1966 (sub)
