= John Leahy (hurler) =

Irish hurler and Gaelic footballer (born 1969)

Personal information
- Native name: Seán Ó Laochda (Irish)
- Born: 16 September 1969 (age 57) Mullinahone, County Tipperary
- Height: 5 ft 10 in (178 cm)

Sport
- Sport: Hurling / Gaelic Football
- Position: Half-forward
Club
- Years: Club
- Mullinahone
Club titles
- Tipperary titles: 1 County SH (2002)
Inter-county
Years	County	Apps (scores)
1988–2003	Tipperary	? (5-75)
Inter-county titles
- Munster titles: 5
- All-Irelands: 3
- NHL: 4
- All Stars: 3

John Leahy (born 16 September 1969 in Mullinahone) is a former Irish sportsperson. He played senior hurling with the Tipperary inter-county team from 1988 until 2003. He also represented Tipperary in all grades in Gaelic football.

== Early life and private life ==
John Leahy was born in Mullinahone, County Tipperary in 1969. He was educated locally in Mullinahone N.S., Ballingarry Presentation Convent and Killenaule V.S. He later worked for United Beverages Group in Kilkenny. He is currently working as a Drug Education Officer with the Health Service Executive (HSE).

On 9 February 2005 Leahy was profiled on the TG4 television programme Laochra Gael.

== Playing career ==
=== Club ===
Leahy played his club hurling and football with his local Mullinahone club. He enjoyed much success winning county medals in both codes at underage levels. By the time Leahy's club career was coming to an end Mullinahone had been promoted to the senior grade. In 2002 he battled back from a cruciate ligament injury to be appointed player-manager of the club's senior hurling side. That year he guided Mullinahone to their first senior county championship.

=== Minor & under-21 ===
Leahy's hurling skills quickly came to the attention of the Tipperary inter-county selectors and he joined the minor panel in 1987. In 1987 he won a Munster minor medal and joined the Senior Hurling and U21 Teams in 1988. In 1989 Leahy won a Munster title with the under-21 team before later converting this into an All-Ireland medal. In 1990 he won a second Munster under-21 medal. That year he was the first Mullinahone man to Captain a Tipperary Side to a Munster Hurling Title.

=== Senior Hurling ===
In 1988 Leahy made his senior inter-county debut in a National Hurling League game against Antrim. In doing so he became the first Mullinahone man ever to play for the senior side. Tipp later went on to win the league title, with Leahy coming on as a substitute in the final. Later that year he came on as a substitute in the Munster final to claim his first senior provincial medal. Tipperary later lost the All-Ireland final to Galway. In 1989 Leahy was a full member of the Tipperary team and he captured a second consecutive Munster medal. This was later converted into his first senior All-Ireland medal following a final victory over Antrim.

Two years later in 1991 Leahy captured a third provincial medal before later winning his second All-Ireland medal following a win over Kilkenny. His performance throughout the whole championship earned Leahy his first All-Star award. In 1993 he won his fourth Munster medal, however, Tipperary were later beaten by Galway in the All-Ireland semi-final. Leahy won a second National League medal before adding a second All-Star award to his collection at the end of 1994. Leahy has a unique record of the only player to win an all-Star without playing in the championship in 1994. Three years later in 1997 Tipperary lost to Clare in the Munster final. In the first year of the 'back-door system', however, Tipp later qualified to play Clare again in the first-ever All-Munster All-Ireland final. Unfortunately Leahy ended up on the losing side once again. In spite of this he was presented with a third All-Star award.

In 1999 Leahy won his third National League medal, however, further championship success still eluded Tipp. All this changed in 2001 when Tipp began the year by winning another league title. Injuring his right cruciate ligament in the first round of the championship ruled Leahy out of both the Munster and All-Ireland finals, which Tipperary won. Leahy retired from inter-county hurling in 2003, due to damaging his other cruciate ligament.

=== Football ===
Leahy also played football with Tipperary. He won a McGrath Cup title in 1993 when his side beat London in the final. He also lined out in the 1993 All-Ireland Senior Football Championship and 1994 All-Ireland Senior Football Championship.

== Post-playing career ==
In retirement from inter-county hurling Leahy has maintained a key interest in the game. He was a selector during 2006 and 2007 seasons on the senior team managed by Babs Keating.

== Honours ==
=== Player ===
Tipperary

- All-Ireland Senior Hurling Championship (3): 1989, 1991, 2001
- Munster Senior Hurling Championship (5):1988, 1989, 1991, 1993, 2001
- National Hurling League (4):1987–88, 1993–94, 1999, 2001
- All-Ireland Under-21 Hurling Championship (1): 1989
- Munster Under-21 Hurling Championship (1): 1989,
- McGrath Cup (1): 1993

Mullinahone

- Tipperary Senior Hurling Championship (1): 2002

=== Individual ===
Awards

- All-Star (3): 1991, 1994, 1997
