= 1987–88 National Hurling League =

57th season of the National Hurling League

League details
- Dates: 11 October 1987 – 29 July 1988

League champions
- Winners: Tipperary (15th win)

Other division winners
- Division 2: Offaly
- Division 3: Meath
- Division 4: Longford

The 1987–88 National Hurling League (known as the Royal Liver National Hurling League for sponsorship reasons) was the 57th edition of the National Hurling League.

== Division 1 ==
National Hurling League Division 1
- Season: 1987-88
- Champions: Tipperary; 15th National League title Captain: Pat O'Neill; Manager: Michael Keating
- Relegated: Clare; Cork
- Matches played: 34
- Top goalscorer: Pat Fox (6-40)
- All statistics correct as of 24 February 2017.

Galway came into the season as defending champions of the 1985-86 season. Westmeath and Wexford entered Division 1 as the promoted teams.

On 24 April 1988, Tipperary won the title following a 3-15 to 2-9 win over Offaly in the final. It was their first league title since 1978-79 and their 14th National League title overall.

Clare and Cork were relegated from Division 1.

Tipperary's Pat Fox was the Division 1 top scorer with 6-40.

=== Table ===
Pos	Team	Pld	W	D	L	Diff	Pts	Notes
1	Wexford	7	5	1	1	23	11	
2	Waterford	7	5	0	2	15	10	
3	Tipperary	7	4	1	2	20	9	Division 1 champions
4	Galway	7	3	3	1	15	9	
5	Kilkenny	7	4	0	3	14	8	
6	Limerick	7	2	0	5	-19	4	
7	Clare	7	2	0	5	-37	4	Relegated to Division 2
8	Cork	7	0	1	6	-31	1	Relegated to Division 2

=== Group stage ===
11 October 1987	Tipperary	3-12 - 1-4	Limerick	Semple Stadium, Thurles
	P Fox 2-4, A Ryan 0-4, A Buckley 1-0, P Fitzell 0-2, N English 0-1, D O'Connell 0-1.		T Kenny 1-0, G Kirby 0-2, G Hegarty 0-1, A Carmody 0-1.	Referee: J Moore (Waterford)

11 October 1987	Clare	1-14 - 1-11	Wexford	Cusack Park, Ennis
	V Donnellan 0-7, D Chaplin 1-2, T Guilfoyle 0-2, P Barry 0-1, A Cunningham 0-1, S Heaslip 0-1.		T Dempsey 0-8, B Byrne 1-1, R Murphy 0-1, John O'Connor 0-1.	Referee: W Barrett (Tipperary)

11 October 1987	Waterford	2-14 - 1-10	Kilkenny	Walsh Park, Waterford
	K Delahunty 1-6, S Ahearn 1-0, B O'Sullivan 0-3, P Bennett 0-2, N Crowley 0-2, D Byrne 0-1.		L McCarthy 1-0, T Bawle 0-3, R Power 0-2, H Ryan 0-1, T Lennon 0-1, S Whearty 0-1, L Ryan 0-1, B Young 0-1.	Referee: G Ryan (Tipperary)

25 October 1987	Kilkenny	0-13 - 0-15	Galway	Nowlan Park, Kilkenny
	T Leahy 0-7, H Ryan 0-2, L Ryan 0-1, S Whearty 0-1, R Power 0-1, E Morrissey 0-1.		J Cooney 0-8, P Nolan 0-3, P Higgins 0-2, M McGrath 0-1, PJ Molloy 0-1.

25 October 1987	Wexford	2-11 - 1-7	Tipperary	St. Patrick's Park, Enniscorthy
	J Hoilihan 0-7, M Morrissey 1-1, J McDonald 1-0, T Dempsey 0-2, B Byrne 0-1.		G Maher 1-0, A Ryan 0-3, P Fox 0-2, P Delaney 0-1, C Stakelum 0-1.

25 October 1987	Limerick	3-9 - 1-11	Clare	Bruff Sportsfield, Bruff
	S Fitzgibbon 2-0, T Kenny 1-0, G Kirby 0-3, M Nelligan 0-1, M Reale 0-1, T Quaid 0-1, B Finn 0-1, P Creamer 0-1.		V Donnellan 1-7, D Ryan 0-1, T Guilfoyle 0-1, S Heaslip 0-1, A Cunningham 0-1.

25 October 1987	Cork	0-10 - 3-10	Waterford	Páirc Mac Gearailt, Fermoy
	M Foley 0-4, J Griffin 0-2, E Kavanagh 0-1, S McCarthy 0-1, G Manley 0-1, J Tobin 0-1.		J Quirke 2-2, B O'Sullivan 1-1, K Delahunty 0-3, S Ahearne 0-3, N Crowley 0-1.	Referee: T Murray (Limerick)

8 November 1987	Clare	1-6 - 2-9	Waterford	Cusack Park, Ennis
	V Donnellan 0-6, T Guilfoyle 1-0.		B O'Sullivan 2-0, K Delahunty 0-5, M Walsh 0-2, S Ahern 0-2.	Referee: P Long (Kilkenny)

8 November 1987	Wexford	0-11 - 0-7	Kilkenny	Wexford Park, Wexford
	J Houlihan 0-9, P Carton 0-1, B Byrne 0-1.		T Leahy 0-5, L Fennelly 0-1, H Ryan 0-1.	Referee: S Moore (Waterford)

8 November 1987	Tipperary	0-7 - 0-7	Galway	Semple Stadium, Thurles
	P Fox 0-2, P Delaney 0-1, P Fitzelle 0-1, P O'Neill 0-1, N English 0-1, C Stakelum 0-1.		J Cooney 0-3, M McGrath 0-2, S Mahon 0-1, P Nolan 0-1.	Referee: T Murray (Limerick)

8 November 1987	Limerick	1-10 - 2-2	Cork	FitzGerald Park, Kilmallock
	G Kirby 1-5, P Foley 0-2, B Finn 0-2, S Fitzgibbon 0-1.		M Mullins 1-2, K Hennessy 1-0.	Referee: G Ryan (Tipperary)

15 November 1987	Kilkenny	2-7 - 1-8	Clare	Nowlan Park, Kilkenny
	L Ryan 1-1, M Phelan 1-0, T Leahy 0-3, C Heffernan 0-1, J Power 0-1, S Whearty 0-1.		C Lyons 1-1, V Donnellan 0-4, M Meehan 0-2, T Guilfoyle 0-1.	Referee: W Barrett (Tipperary)

15 November 1987	Waterford	1-10 - 2-13	Wexford	Walsh Park, Waterford
	N Crowley 1-3, K Delahunty 0-6, S Ahearne 0-1.		J Houlihan 1-6, S Wickham 1-1, P Carton 0-3, B Byrne 0-1, T Dempsey 0-1, J McDonald 0-1.	Referee: P Long (Kilkenny)

15 November 1987	Galway	2-15 - 2-12	Limerick	Duggan Park, Ballinasloe
	M Connolly 0-6, E Ryan 1-1, PJ Molloy 1-0, A Cunningham 0-3, P Malone 0-2, S Mahon 0-1, C Hayes 0-1, S Linnane 0-1.		G Kirby 0-7, P Creamer 1-0, T Kenny 1-0, P Foley 0-1, M Nelligan 0-1, M Reale 0-1, S Fitzgibbon 0-1, B Finn 0-1.	Referee: G Long (Tipperary)

22 November 1987	Cork	0-8 - 2-10	Tipperary	Páirc Uí Chaoimh, Cork
	M Mullins 0-3, G Fitzgerald 0-2, K Hennessy 0-1, J Tobin 0-1, T O'Sullivan 0-1.		P Fox 0-6, N English 1-1, D O'Connell 1-0, D Ryan 0-1, C Bonnar 0-1, A Ryan 0-1.	Referee: J Denton (Wexford)

29 November 1987	Kilkenny	3-12 - 1-14	Limerick	Nowlan Park, Kilkenny
	C Heffernan 1-1, L Fennelly 1-1, L Ryan 1-0, M Phelan 0-4, T Leahy 0-2, J Power 0-1, M Cleere 0-1, R Heffernan 0-1, R Power 0-1.		G Kirby 0-7, T Kenny 1-1, G Ryan 0-3, M Nelligan 0-1, B Finn 0-1, R Sampson 0-1.	Referee: J Denton (Wexford)

29 November 1987	Tipperary	0-18 - 1-8	Waterford	Semple Stadium, Thurles
	P Fox 0-9, N English 0-4, D Ryan 0-2, P Delaney 0-2, A Ryan 0-1.		M Neville 1-1, K Delahunty 0-4, N Crowley 0-1, M Walsh 0-1, B O'Sullivan 0-1.	Referee: D Murphy (Wexford)

29 November 1987	Galway	3-14 - 2-3	Clare	Pearse Stadium, Salthill
	J Cooney 1-6, A Cunningham 1-4, E Ryan 1-0, M Naughton 0-2, M McGrath 0-1, S Mahon 0-1.		V Donnellan 2-2, T Guilfoyle 0-1.	Referee: G Kirwan (Offaly)

29 November 1987	Wexford	1-10 - 2-6	Cork	O'Kennedy Park, New Ross
	J Houlihan 0-6, B Byrne 1-1, G O'Connor 0-1, M Morrissey 0-1, T Dempsey 0-1.		M Mullins 1-3, K Kingston 1-1, T O'Sullivan 0-1, M Foley 0-1.	Referee: W Barrett (Tipperary)

6 December 1987	Galway	2-9 - 1-12	Cork	Pearse Stadium, Salthill
	PJ Molloy 1-1, A Cunningham 1-0, M Naughton 0-3, J Cooney 0-2, S Mahon 0-1, M McGrath 0-1, P Nolan 0-1.		M Mullins 0-5, P Hartnett 0-4, M Barry 1-0, K Kingston 0-2, F Ramsay 0-1.	Referee: K Walsh (Limerick)

21 February 1988	Cork	2-6 - 4-7	Kilkenny	Páirc Uí Chaoimh, Cork
	K Hennessy 1-2, L Forde 1-0, M Mullins 0-3, P Hartnett 0-1.		L Fennelly 2-1, M Phelan 1-2, C Heffernan 1-0, S Whearty 0-2, M Cleere 0-2.	Referee: G Kirwan (Offaly)

21 February 1988	Waterford	4-10 - 3-10	Galway	Fraher Field, Dungarvan
	J McDonald 2-0, K Delahunty 0-6, S Ahearne 1-2, P Bennett 1-0, M Walsh 0-1, N Crowley 0-1.		J Cooney 0-6, E Ryan 1-1, B Lynskey 1-1, J Commins 1-0, T Keady 0-1, M Naughton 0-1.	Referee: P Long (Kilkenny)

21 February 1988	Limerick	1-8 - 0-16	Wexford	Bruff Sportsfield, Bruff
	G Ryan 1-2, G Kirby 0-3, B Finn 0-3.		J Houlihan 0-7, M Storey 0-4, S Fitzhenry 0-4, B Byrne 0-1.	Referee: W Horgan (Cork)

21 February 1988	Clare	1-11 - 6-11	Tipperary	Cusack Park, Ennis
	V Donnellan 0-7, G O'Loughlin 1-0, J O'Connell 0-2, T Guilfoyle 0-1, D Ryan 0-1.		P Fox 2-6, N English 1-4, C Bonnar 1-1, D O'Connell 1-0, D Ryan 1-0.	Referee: T Murray (Limerick)

6 March 1988	Limerick	1-9 - 2-9	Waterford	FitzGerald Park, Kilmallock
	G Kirby 1-4, B Finn 0-2, G Hegarty 0-1, T Kenny 0-1, G Ryan 0-1.		K Delahunty 0-5, M Walsh 1-1, P Ryan 1-0, D Byrne 0-1, N Crowley 0-1, S Ahearne 0-1.	Referee: G Ryan (Tipperary)

6 March 1988	Kilkenny	2-12 - 0-4	Tipperary	Nowlan Park, Kilkenny
	M Phelan 2-1, R Heffernan 0-4, M Cleere 0-2, S Fennelly 0-1, R Power 0-1, J Mulcahy 0-1, L Fennelly 0-1, J Brennan 0-1.		P Fox 0-2, C Ryan 0-1, D O'Connell 0-1.	Referee: T Murphy (Limerick)

6 March 1988	Wexford	2-9 - 0-15	Galway	Wexford Park, Wexford
	J Houlihan 2-4, S Fitzhenry 0-3, G O'Connor 0-1, J Conran 0-1.		J Cooney 0-8, A Cunningham 0-3, M Connolly 0-2, E Ryan 0-2.	Referee: W Barrett (Tipperary)

6 March 1988	Cork	3-15 - 4-13	Clare	Páirc Uí Chaoimh, Cork
	M Barry 2-2, M Mullins 0-5, L Forde 1-1, T O'Sullivan 0-4, K Kingston 0-1, T McCarthy 0-1, L Kelly 0-1.		V O'Loughlin 2-2, V Donnellan 0-6, T Guilfoyle 1-1, J Shanahan 1-0, M Guilfoyle 0-2, C Lyons 0-1, D Ryan 0-1.	Referee: J Denton (Wexford)

=== Play-off ===
10 April 1988 Play-off	Clare	2-7 - 1-11	Limerick	Semple Stadium, Thurles
	G McInerney 2-1, M Foyle 0-2, V Donnellan 0-2, D Ryan 0-1, D Chaplin 0-1.		G Kirby 0-7, O O'Connor 1-0, L O'Connor 0-2, R Sampson 0-1, B Finn 0-1.

=== Knock-out stage ===
Quarter-finals

20 March 1988 Quarter-final	Galway	1-13 - 2-11	Offaly	Croke Park, Dublin
	M McGrath 0-4, B Lynskey 1-0, J Cooney 0-2, E Ryan 0-2, A Cunningham 0-2, T Keady 0-1, T Monaghan 0-1, PJ Molloy 0-1.		M Corrigan 0-6, P Cleary 1-1, P Corrigan 1-0, D Owens 0-2, B Keeshan 0-1, S O'Donoghue 0-1.	Referee: T Murray (Limerick)

20 March 1988 Quarter-final	Antrim	2-9 - 2-20	Tipperary	Croke Park, Dublin
	D Donnelly 1-3, F McAllister 1-1, O McFetridge 0-3, D Armstrong 0-1, K Barr 0-1.		N English 2-7, D Ryan 0-4, A Ryan 0-3, P Fox 0-2, B Ryan 0-2, P Delaney 0-1, J Hayes 0-1.	Referee: P Long (Kilkenny)

Semi-finals

10 April 1988 Semi-final	Waterford	1-8 - 4-19	Tipperary	Croke Park, Dublin
	K Delahunty 0-4, P Bennett 1-0, L O'Connor 0-1, S Aherne 0-1, P Ryan 0-1, B O'Sullivan 0-1.		N English 2-11, P Fox 2-4, A Ryan 0-2, D O'Connell 0-1, P O'Neill 0-1.	Referee: P Long (Kilkenny)

10 April 1988 Semi-final	Wexford	3-11 - 2-16	Offaly	Croke Park, Dublin
	T Dempsey 2-2, J Holohan 0-5, B Byrne 1-0, S Fitzhenry 0-3, G O'Connor 0-1.		M Corrigan 0-9, B Keeshan 1-3, J Dooley 1-1, P O'Connor 0-2, E Coughlan 0-1.	Referee: T Murray (Limerick)

Final

24 April 1988 Final	Offaly	2-9 - 3-15	Tipperary	Croke Park, Dublin
	M Corrigan 1-3, E Coughlan 1-1, B Keeshan 0-3, J Kelly 0-2.	Highlights	N English 1-3, P O'Neill 2-1, P Delaney 0-4, P Fox 0-3, J Hayes 0-1, C Bonnar 0-1, A Ryan 0-1, D O'Connell 0-1.	Referee: J Denton (Wexford)

=== Scoring statistics ===
Top scorers overall

Rank	Player	Team	Tally	Total	Matches	Average
1	Pat Fox	Tipperary	6-40	58	10	5.80
2	Nicky English	Tipperary	7-33	54		
3	Jimmy Holohan	Wexford	3-44	53		
4	Val Donnellan	Clare	3-41	50	8	6.25
5	Gary Kirby	Limerick	2-38	44	8	5.50
6	Kieran Delahunty	Waterford	1-39	42	8	5.25
7	Joe Cooney	Galway	1-35	38		
8	Mickey Mullins	Cork	2-21	27		
9	Tom Dempsey	Wexford	2-14	20		
9	Anthony Cunningham	Galway	2-14	20		

Top scorers in a single game

Rank	Player	Team	Tally	Total	Opposition
1	Nicky English	Tipperary	2-11	17	Waterford
2	Nicky English	Tipperary	2-07	13	Antrim
3	Pat Fox	Tipperary	2-06	12	Clare
4	Pat Fox	Tipperary	2-04	10	Limerick
4	Jimmy Holohan	Wexford	2-04	10	Galway
4	Pat Fox	Tipperary	2-04	10	Waterford
4	Val Donnellan	Clare	1-07	10	Limerick
8	Kieran Delahunty	Waterford	1-06	9	Kilkenny
8	Jimmy Holohan	Wexford	1-06	9	Waterford
8	Joe Cooney	Galway	1-06	9	Clare
8	Jimmy Holohan	Wexford	0-09	9	Kilkenny
8	Pat Fox	Tipperary	0-09	9	Waterford
8	Mark Corrigan	Offaly	0-09	9	Wexford

== Division 2 ==
National Hurling League Division 2
- Season: 1987-88
- Champions: Offaly
- Promoted: Antrim
- Relegated: Down; Roscommon
- All statistics correct as of 24 February 2017.

Down, Offaly, Roscommon and Westmeath entered Division 2 as the promoted and relegated teams from the previous season.

On 6 March 1988, Offaly secured the title following a 1-13 to 3-4 win over Down in the final round of the group stage. Antrim secured promotion to Division 1 as the second-placed team.

Down and Roscommon were relegated from Division 2.

=== Table ===
Pos	Team	Pld	W	D	L	Pts	Notes
1	Offaly (C)	7	7	0	0	14	Promoted to Division 1
2	Antrim	7	5	0	2	10	Promoted to Division 1
3	Dublin	7	4	0	3	8	
4	Laois	7	4	0	3	8	
5	Kerry	7	3	1	3	7	
6	Westmeath	7	2	1	4	5	
7	Down	7	1	2	4	4	Relegated to Division 3
8	Roscommon	7	0	0	7	0	Relegated to Division 3

== Division 3 ==
National Hurling League Division 3
- Season: 1987-88
- Champions: Meath
- Promoted: Derry
- Relegated: Tyrone
- All statistics correct as of 25 February 2017.

Mayo, Meath and Tyrone entered Division 3 as the promoted and relegated teams from the previous season.

Meath secured the title following a 5-7 to 2-5 win over Kildare in the final round of the group stage. Derry secured promotion to Division 2 as the second-placed team.

Tyrone were relegated from Division 3.

=== Table ===
Pos	Team	Pld	W	D	L	Pts	Notes
1	Meath (C)	7	7	0	0	14	Promoted to Division 2
2	Derry	7	6	0	1	12	Promoted to Division 2
6	Kildare	7	5	0	2	10	
3	Carlow	7	5	0	2	10	
4	Mayo	7	3	0	4	6	
5	Armagh	7	3	0	4	6	
7	Wicklow	7	3	0	4	6	
8	Tyrone	7	0	0	7	0	Relegated to Division 4

== Division 4 ==
National Hurling League Division 4
- Season: 1987-88
- Champions: Longford
- All statistics correct as of 25 February 2017.

Monaghan entered Division 4 as the relegated team from the previous season.

On 29 July 1988, Longford secured the title following a 2-9 to 2-7 win over Monaghan in a replay of the league final.

=== Knock-out stage ===
Semi-final

22 June 1988 Semi-final	Longford	2-11 - 2-6	Sligo	Páirc Seán Mac Diarmada, Carrick

26 June 1988 Semi-final	Monaghan	7-17 - 6-11	Leitrim	Breffni Park, Cavan

Finals

10 July 1988 Final	Monaghan	3-15 - 5-9	Longford	Breffni Park, Cavan

29 July 1988 Final replay	Longford	2-9 - 2-7	Monaghan	Breffni Park, Cavan
