= 1991 All-Ireland Senior Hurling Championship =

Championship details
- Dates: 19 May – 1 September 1991
- Teams: 16

All-Ireland champions
- Winning team: Tipperary (24th win)
- Captain: Declan Carr
- Manager: Michael 'Babs' Keating

All-Ireland Finalists
- Losing team: Kilkenny
- Captain: Liam Fennelly
- Manager: Ollie Walsh

Provincial champions
- Munster: Tipperary
- Leinster: Kilkenny
- Ulster: Antrim
- Connacht: Not Played

Championship statistics
- No. matches played: 16
- Top Scorer: Michael Cleary (3–35)
- Player of the Year: Pat Fox
- All-Star Team: See here

The 1991 All-Ireland Senior Hurling Championship was the 105th staging of the All-Ireland Senior Hurling Championship, the Gaelic Athletic Association's premier inter-county hurling tournament. The championship began on 19 May 1991 and ended on 1 September 1991.

Cork were the defending champions but were defeated by Tipperary in the Munster final replay. Westmeath qualified for the All-Ireland quarter-final as winners of the B championship.

On 1 September 1991, Tipperary won the championship following a 1–16 to 0–15 defeat of Kilkenny in the All-Ireland final. This was their 24th All-Ireland title, their second in three championship seasons.

Tipperary's Michael Cleary was the championship's top scorer with 3–35. Tipperary's Pat Fox was the choice for Texaco Hurler of the Year.

== Team changes ==
=== To Championship ===
Promoted from the All-Ireland Senior B Hurling Championship

- Derry
- Westmeath (qualified)

=== From Championship ===
Regraded to the All-Ireland Senior B Hurling Championship

- London

== Teams ==
=== General information ===
Sixteen counties will compete in the All-Ireland Senior Hurling Championship: one team from the Connacht Senior Hurling Championship, five teams in the Leinster Senior Hurling Championship, six teams in the Munster Senior Hurling Championship, three teams from the Ulster Senior Hurling Championship and one team from the All-Ireland Senior B Hurling Championship.

County	Last provincial title	Last championship title	Position in 1990 Championship	Current championship
Antrim	1990	—		Ulster Senior Hurling Championship
Clare	1932	1914		Munster Senior Hurling Championship
Cork	1990	1990		Munster Senior Hurling Championship
Derry	1908	—		Ulster Senior Hurling Championship
Down	1942	—		Ulster Senior Hurling Championship
Dublin	1961	1938		Leinster Senior Hurling Championship
Galway	1922	1988		Connacht Senior Hurling Championship
Kerry	1891	1891		Munster Senior Hurling Championship
Kilkenny	1987	1983		Leinster Senior Hurling Championship
Laois	1949	1915		Leinster Senior Hurling Championship
Limerick	1981	1973		Munster Senior Hurling Championship
Offaly	1990	1985		Leinster Senior Hurling Championship
Tipperary	1989	1989		Munster Senior Hurling Championship
Waterford	1963	1959		Munster Senior Hurling Championship
Westmeath	—	—		All-Ireland Senior B Hurling Championship
Wexford	1977	1968		Leinster Senior Hurling Championship

== Provincial championships ==
=== Munster Senior Hurling Championship ===
May 19
Quarter-Final

Kerry	1–12 – 2–15	Waterford
J. Hennessy (1–6), D. O'Regan (0–2), B. O'Mahony (0–2), L. O'Connor (0–1), C. Walsh (0–1).		M. O'Keeffe (1–2), B. O'Sullivan (1–1), L. O'Connor (0–4), Hanley (0–3), E. Nolan (0–1), K. Delahunty (0–1), P. Prendergast (0–1), N. Crowley (0–1), J. Brenner (0–1).

FitzGerald Stadium, Killarney
Referee: T. Murray (Limerick)

May 19
Quarter-Final

Limerick	0–21 – 1–15	Clare
G. Kirby (0–10), M. Galligan (0–6), C. Carey (0–3), T. Kenny (0–1), M. Houlihan (0–1).		M. Daffy (1–3), C. Lyons (0–4), T. Guilfoyle (0–4), V. Donnellan (0–2), P. Minogue (0–1), M. McNamara (0–1).

Gaelic Grounds, Limerick
Attendance: 14,750
Referee: W. Barrett (Tipperary)

June 2
Semi-Final

Cork	2–10 – 0–13	Waterford
T. O'Sullivan (0–6), K. Hennessy (1–0), J. Fitzgibbon (1–0), C. Casey (0–3), G. FitzGerald (0–1).		K. Delahunty (0–4), B. O'Sullivan (0–2), E. Nolan (0–2), M. O'Keeffe (0–2), S. Aherne (0–1), L. O'Connor (0–1), N. Crowley (0–1).

Semple Stadium, Thurles
Attendance: 12,000
Referee: K. Walsh (Clare)

June 9
Semi-Final

Tipperary	2–18 – 0–10	Limerick
N. English (1–2), M. Cleary (0–5), Cormac Bonnar (1–1), P. Fox (0–4), D. Ryan (0–3), J. Leahy (0–3).		G. Kirby (0–5), M. Galligan (0–1), G. Ryan (0–1), D. Nash (0–1), A. Carmody (0–1), F. Carroll (0–1).

Semple Stadium, Thurles
Attendance: 35,000
Referee: J. Moore (Waterford)

July 7
Final

Cork	4–10 – 2–16	Tipperary
G. FitzGerald (2–0), K. Hennessy (1–2), J. Fitzgibbon (1–2), T. O'Sullivan (0–3), C. Casey (0–2), P. Buckley (0–1).		M. Cleary (0–8), P. Fox (1–3), J. Leahy (1–1), Cormac Bonnar (0–1), N. English (0–1), A. Ryan (0–1), D. Ryan (0–1).

Páirc Uí Chaoimh, Cork
Attendance: 46,695
Referee: T. Murray (Limerick)

July 20
Final
Replay

Tipperary	4–19 – 4–15	Cork
M. Cleary (1–7), P. Fox (1–5), A. Ryan (1–1), D. Carr (1–1), D. Ryan (0–2), J. Leahy (0–2), Cormac Bonnar (0–1).		J. Fitzgibbon (2–1), T. O'Sullivan (0–6), G. FitzGerald (1–2), K. Hennessy (1–0), J. Cashman (0–3), T. Mulcahy (0–1), P. Buckley (0–1), C. Casey (0–1).

Semple Stadium, Thurles
Attendance: 55,000
Referee: T. Murray (Limerick)

=== Leinster Senior Hurling Championship ===
May 26
Quarter-Final

Wexford	2–19 – 2–14	Laois
J. Holohan (1–10), M. Storey (0–4), E. Sinnott (1–0), J. O'Connor (0–3), D. Prendergast (0–1), B. Byrne (0–1).		P. Bergin (0–8), N. Rigney (1–3), J. Bates (1–0), M. O'Sullivan (0–2), O. Coss (0–1).

Nowlan Park, Kilkenny
Referee: P. Horan (Offaly)

June 30
Semi-Final

Kilkenny	2–9 – 0–13	Wexford
D. J. Carey (1–5), J. Power (1–0), É. Morrissey (0–2), L. McCarthy (0–1), M. Phelan (0–1).		J. Holohan (0–5), B. Byrne (0–2), M. Storey (0–2), T. Dempsey (0–2), S. Fitzhenry (0–1), G. O'Connor (0–1).

Croke Park, Dublin
Referee: P. Delaney (Laois)

June 30
Semi-Final

Dublin	0-19 – 1-14	Offaly
M. J. Ryan (0-5), S. McDermott (0-4), J. Morris (0-3), J. Murphy (0–2), B. McMahon (0–1), S. Morkham (0–1), M. Ryan (0–1), J. Twomey (0–1), S. Kearns (0–1).		Johnny Dooley (1–7), B. Dooley (0–2), J. Pilkington (0–2), D. Regan (0–1), H. Rigney (0–1), B. Whelehan (0–1).

Croke Park, Dublin
Referee: D. Murphy (Wexford)

July 21
Final

Dublin	1-11 – 1-13	Kilkenny
M. J. Ryan (0-4), S. McDermott (1-0), J. Morris (0-3), R. Boland (0–1), C. Ó Giolláin (0–1), C. Hetherton (0–1), S. Kearns (0–1).		A. Ronan (1–3), D. J. Carey (0–5), J. Power (0–3), L. McCarthy (0–2).

Croke Park, Dublin
Referee: D. Murphy (Wexford)

=== Ulster Senior Hurling Championship ===
June 23
Semi-Final

Down	6–13 – 2–10	Derry
N. Sands (3–1), G. Blaney (2–1), C. Mageen (1–4), D. Hughes (0–4), B. Coulter (0–2), M. Blaney (0–1).		O. Collins (0–7), B. Regan (1–0), D. Cassidy (1–0), P. Cassidy (0–1), R. McCloskey (0–1), A. McCrystal (0–1).

Casement Park, Belfast

July 7
Final

Antrim	3–14 – 3–10	Down
J. Carson (1–8), A. McCarry (2–1), P. McKillen (0–4), T. McNaughton (0–1).		C. Mageen (2–1), N. Sands (0–7), P. Coulter (1–0), K. Coulter (0–1), J. McCarthy (0–1).

Casement Park, Belfast

== All-Ireland Senior Hurling Championship ==
=== Bracket ===
Quarter-finals
Antrim	5–11
Westmeath	1–05

Semi-finals
Kilkenny	2–18
Antrim	1–19
Tipperary	3–13
Galway	1–09

Final
Kilkenny	0–15
Tipperary	1–16

=== All-Ireland quarter-finals ===
July 21
Quarter-Final

Antrim	5–11 – 1–5	Westmeath
C. Barr (2–1), J. Close (2–0), J. Carson (1–2), P. Jennings (0–3), T. McNaughton (0–2), A. McGuile (0–1), P. McKillen (0–1), J. McNaughton (0–1).		R. Galvin (1–0), D. Kilcoyne (0–3), A. Devine (0–2).

St. Brigid's Park, Dundalk
Referee: A. Mac Suibhne (Dublin)

=== All-Ireland semi-finals ===
August 4
Semi-Final

Kilkenny	2–18 – 1–19	Antrim
É. Morrissey (2–4), D. J. Carey (0–8), L. McCarthy (0–3), L. Fennelly (0–1), C. Heffernan (0–1), P. Dwyer (0–1).		J. Carson (0–7), T. McNaughton (0–4), D. Donnelly (1–0), A. McCarry (0–3), C. Barr (0–2), J. McNaughton (0–1), P. McKillen (0–1), J. Close (0–1).

Croke Park, Dublin
Attendance: 60,976
Referee: W. Horgan (Cork)

August 4
Semi-Final

Tipperary	3–13 – 1–9	Galway
M. Cleary (1–9), D. Ryan (1–0), Cormac Bonna (1–0), C. Stakelum (0–2), J. Leahy (0–1), D. Carr (0–1).		M. McGrath (1–1), J. Cooney (0–4), J. Rabbitte (0–1). B. Keogh (0–1), R. Duane (0–1), M. Naughton (0–1).

Croke Park, Dublin
Attendance: 60,976
Referee: D. Murphy (Wexford)

=== All-Ireland final ===
September 1
Final
15:30

Tipperary	1–16 – 0–15	Kilkenny
M. Cleary (1–6), P. Fox (0–5), A. Ryan (0–2), D. Ryan (0–1), J. Leahy (0–1), B. Ryan (0–1).		D. J. Carey (0–9), É. Morrissey (0–3), L. Fennelly (0–1), L. McCarthy (0–1), R. Power (0–1).

Croke Park, Dublin
Attendance: 64,500
Referee: W. Horgan (Cork)

== Top scorers ==
=== Season ===
Rank	Player	County	Tally	Total	Matches	Average
1	Michael Cleary	Tipperary	3–35	44	5	8.80
2	D. J. Carey	Kilkenny	1–27	30	4	7.50
3	Pat Fox	Tipperary	2–17	23	5	4.60
3	John Carson	Antrim	2–17	23	5	4.60
5	John Holohan	Wexford	1–15	18	2	9.00
6	Noel Sands	Down	3–8	17	2	8.50
6	John Fitzgibbon	Cork	4–3	15	3	5.00
6	Eamon Morrissey	Kilkenny	2–9	15	4	3.75
6	Tony O'Sullivan	Cork	0–15	15	3	5.00
6	Gary Kirby	Limerick	0–15	15	2	7.50

=== Single game ===
Rank	Player	County	Tally	Total	Opposition
1	John Holohan	Wexford	1–10	13	Laois
2	Michael Cleary	Kilkenny	1–9	12	Galway
3	John Carson	Antrim	1–8	11	Down
4	Gary Kirby	Limerick	0–10	10	Clare
4	Michael Cleary	Tipperary	1–7	10	Cork
4	Johnny Dooley	Offaly	1–7	10	Dublin
4	Noel Sands	Down	3–1	10	Derry
4	Eamon Morrissey	Kilkenny	2–4	10	Antrim
9	Joe Hennessy	Kerry	1–6	9	Waterford
9	Michael Cleary	Tipperary	1–6	9	Kilkenny
9	D. J. Carey	Kilkenny	0–9	9	Tipperary

=== Clean sheets ===
Rank	Goalkeeper	County	Clean sheets
1	Ken Hogan	Tipperary	2
2	Davy Fitzgerald	Clare	1
2	Ger Cunningham	Cork	1
2	Michael Walsh	Kilkenny	1
2	Jim Troy	Offaly	1

== Broadcasting ==
The following matches were broadcast live on television in Ireland on RTÉ. In the United Kingdom Channel 4 broadcast live coverage of the All-Ireland final. Highlights of a number of other games were shown on The Sunday Game.

Round	RTÉ	Channel 4
Munster final	Tipperary vs Cork	
All-Ireland semi-finals	Kilkenny vs Antrim; Tipperary vs Galway	
All-Ireland final	Tipperary vs Kilkenny	Tipperary vs Kilkenny
