= 1989 All-Ireland Senior Hurling Championship =

Championship details
- Dates: 21 May – 1 September 1989
- Teams: 17

All-Ireland champions
- Winning team: Tipperary (23rd win)
- Captain: Bobby Ryan
- Manager: Michael 'Babs' Keating

All-Ireland Finalists
- Losing team: Antrim
- Captain: Ciaran Barr

Provincial champions
- Munster: Tipperary
- Leinster: Offaly
- Ulster: Antrim
- Connacht: Not Played

Championship statistics
- No. matches played: 17
- Top Scorer: Nicky English (4–38)
- Player of the Year: Nicky English
- All-Star Team: See here

The 1989 All-Ireland Senior Hurling Championship was the 103rd staging of the All-Ireland Senior Hurling Championship, the Gaelic Athletic Association's premier inter-county hurling tournament. The championship ran from 27 May to 3 September 1989.

Galway were the defending champions, however, they were beaten by Tipperary in the All-Ireland semi-finals.

The All-Ireland final was played on 3 September 1989 at Croke Park in Dublin, between Tipperary and Antrim, in what was their first ever meeting in the final. Tipperary won the match by 4–24 to 3–09 to claim their 23rd All-Ireland title overall and a first title in 18 years.

Tipperary's Nicky English was the championship's top scorer with 4–38.

== Team changes ==
=== To Championship ===
Promoted from the All-Ireland Senior B Hurling Championship

- Derry
- Down
- Kildare (qualified)

=== From Championship ===
Regraded to the All-Ireland Senior B Hurling Championship

- London

== Teams ==
=== General information ===
Seventeen counties will compete in the All-Ireland Senior Hurling Championship: one team from the Connacht Senior Hurling Championship, six teams in the Leinster Senior Hurling Championship, six teams in the Munster Senior Hurling Championship, three teams from the Ulster Senior Hurling Championship and one team from the All-Ireland Senior B Hurling Championship.

County	Last provincial title	Last championship title	Position in 1988 Championship	Current championship
Antrim	1946	—	Semi-finals	Ulster Senior Hurling Championship
Clare	1932	1914	Semi-finals (Munster Senior Hurling Championship)	Munster Senior Hurling Championship
Cork	1986	1986	Runners-up (Munster Senior Hurling Championship)	Munster Senior Hurling Championship
Derry	1908	—		Ulster Senior Hurling Championship
Down	1942	—	Runners-up (All-Ireland Senior B Hurling Championship)	Ulster Senior Hurling Championship
Dublin	1961	1938	Semi-finals (Leinster Senior Hurling Championship)	Leinster Senior Hurling Championship
Galway	1922	1988	Champions	Connacht Senior Hurling Championship
Kerry	1891	1891	Quarter-finals (Munster Senior Hurling Championship)	Munster Senior Hurling Championship
Kildare	—	—		All-Ireland Senior B Hurling Championship
Kilkenny	1987	1983	Semi-finals (Leinster Senior Hurling Championship)	Leinster Senior Hurling Championship
Laois	1949	1915	First round (Leinster Senior Hurling Championship)	Leinster Senior Hurling Championship
Limerick	1981	1973	Semi-finals (Munster Senior Hurling Championship)	Munster Senior Hurling Championship
Offaly	1988	1985	Semi-finals	Leinster Senior Hurling Championship
Tipperary	1988	1971	Runners-up	Munster Senior Hurling Championship
Waterford	1963	1959	Quarter-finals (Munster Senior Hurling Championship)	Munster Senior Hurling Championship
Westmeath	—	—	First round (Leinster Senior Hurling Championship)	Leinster Senior Hurling Championship
Wexford	1977	1968	Runners-up (Leinster Senior Hurling Championship)	Leinster Senior Hurling Championship

== Provincial championship ==
=== Leinster Senior Hurling Championship ===
Quarter-Finals
Laois	2–11
Dublin	2–10
Kilkenny	4–29
Westmeath	3–05

Semi-Finals
Offaly	5–14
Laois	1–10
Kilkenny	4–15
Wexford	2–18

Final
Offaly	3–15
Kilkenny	4–09

May 28, 1989
Quarter-Final

Laois	2–11 – 2–10	Dublin
P. Bergin (1–4), P. J. Cuddy (1–0), P. O'Brien (0–2), A. Dunne (0–2), J. Taylor (0–2), N. Rigney (0–1).		M. J. Ryan (1–7), R. Boland (1–1), K. Hepherton (0–1), S. Dalton (0–1).

O'Connor Park, Tullamore
Attendance: 6,000
Referee: D. Murphy (Wexford)

May 28, 1989
Quarter-Final

Kilkenny	4–29 – 3–5	Westmeath
A. Ronan (1–10), C. Heffernan (2–1), L. Ryan (1–1), G. Fennelly (0–4), L. Egan (0–4), L. Fennelly (0–2), T. Prendergast (0–2), T. O'Keeffe (0–2), S. Fennelly (0–2), J. Power (0–1.)		D. Kilcoyne (1–4), R. Shaw (1–0), S. Coyne (1–0), E. Gallagher (0–1).

O'Connor Park, Tullamore
Attendance: 6,000
Referee: P. Horan (Offaly)

June 18, 1989
Semi-Final

Kilkenny	4–15 – 2–18	Wexford
A. Prendergast (2–2), A. Ronan (0–6), C. Heffernan (1–1), L. McCarthy (1–0), R. Power (0–3), L. Fennelly (0–1), M. Phelan (0–1), M. Cleere (0–1).		John O'Connor (1–5), M. Quigley (1–1), M. Storey (0–4), B. Byrne (0–3), T. Dempsey (0–2), L. O'Gorman (0–2), James O'Connor (0–1).

Croke Park, Dublin
Attendance: 33,512
Referee: N. O'Donoghue (Dublin)

June 18, 1989
Semi-Final

Offaly	5–14 – 1–10	Laois
M. Duignan (2–1), D. Dooley (1–3), M. Corrigan (1–2), P. Cleary (1–0), J. Kelly (0–2), J. Pilkington (0–2), D. Pilkington (0–1), D. Owens (0–1), D. Regan (0–1), P. Delaney (0–1).		P. J. Cuddy (1–0), J. Dollard (0–2), J. Taylor (0–2), P. Bergin (0–2), T. Delaney (0–2), P. O'Brien (0–1), L. Bergin (0–1).

Croke Park, Dublin
Attendance: 33,512
Referee: J. Denton (Wexford)

July 9, 1989
Final

Offaly	3–15 – 4–9	Kilkenny
M. Corrigan (3–7), J. Dooley (0–3), P. Corrigan (0–1), V. Teehan (0–1), D. Pilkington (0–1), J. Kelly (0–1), J. Pilkington (0–1).		L. Fennelly (2–0), A. Ronan (0–5), L. McCarthy (1–1), C. Heffernan (1–0), R. Power (0–2), M. Cleere (0–1).

Croke Park, Dublin
Attendance: 24,519
Referee: J. Denton (Wexford)

=== Munster Senior Hurling Championship ===
Quarter-Finals
Waterford	5–13
Clare	1–10
Kerry	3–10
Limerick	6–11

Semi-Finals
Cork	0–18, 4–17
Waterford	0–18, 5–16
Tipperary	4–18
Limerick	2–11

Final
Waterford	2–08
Tipperary	0–26

May 21, 1989
Quarter-Final

Kerry	3–10 – 6–11	Limerick
J. Hennessy (3–5), B. Murphy (0–2), J. O'Sullivan (0–1), P. Healy (0–1), C. Walsh (0–1).		G. Kirby (1–6), L. O'Connor (2–1), S. Fitzgibbon (2–0), T. Kenny (1–1), M. Galligan (0–1), M. Nelligan (0–1), G. Hegarty (0–1).

FitzGerald Stadium, Killarney
Referee: J. Moore (Waterford)

May 21, 1989
Quarter-Final

Waterford	5–13 – 1–10	Clare
P. Murphy (2–0), G. Connors (1–3), N. Crowley (1–1), S. Aherne (1–1), K. Delahunty (0–4), W. Sullivan (0–2), P. Prendergast (0–2).		C. Lyons (0–6), V. Donnellan (1–0), M. Nugent (0–2), M. Guilfoyle (0–1), G. O'Loughlin (0–1).

Semple Stadium, Thurles
Referee: W. Barrett (Tipperary)

June 4, 1989
Semi-Final

Waterford	0–18 – 0–18	Cork
K. Delahunty (0–6), S. Aherne (0–4), N. Crowley (0–3), A. Qualter (0–2), G. Connors (0–1), L. O'Connor (0–1).		F. Delaney (0–8), T. O'Sullivan (0–3), M. Foley (0–2), T. McCarthy (0–2), B. Cunningham (0–1), M. Mullins (0–1), P. O'Connor (0–1).

Semple Stadium, Thurles
Attendance: 9,216
Referee: K. Walsh (Limerick)

June 11, 1989
Semi-Final

Tipperary	4–18 – 2–11	Limerick
N. English (2–5), P. Fox (1–5), J. Hayes (1–2), J. Leahy (0–1), Conal Bonnar (0–1), P. Delaney (0–1), D. Ryan (0–1), Cormac Bonnar (0–1), J. Cormack (0–1).		S. Fitzgibbon (1–4), G. Kirby (0–4), T. Kenny (1–0), M. Galligan (0–1), M. Nelligan (0–1), M. Reale (0–1).

Páirc Uí Chaoimh, Cork
Attendance: 23,159
Referee: W. Horgan (Cork)

June 18, 1989
Semi-Final
Replay

Waterford	5–16 – 4–17	Cork
P. Murphy (3–0), S. Aherne (1–3), N. Crowley (0–6), B. Sullivan (1–2), A. Qualter (0–3), L. O'Connor (0–1), K. Delahunty (0–1).		F. Delaney (1–11), M. Foley (2–0), T. McCarthy (1–1), S. O'Gorman (0–3), T. O'Sullivan (0–1), M. Mullins (0–1).

Semple Stadium, Thurles
Attendance: 15,178
Referee: K. Walsh (Limerick)

July 2, 1989
Final

Tipperary	0–26 – 2–8	Waterford
N. English (0–13), P. Delaney (0–3), M. Cleary (0–3), P. Fox (0–2), J. Cormack (0–1), A. Ryan (0–1), J. Hayes (0–1), J. Leahy (0–1), Conal Bonnar (0–1).		K. Delahunty (1–4), L. O'Connor (1–1), S. Aherne (0–1), B. Sullivan (0–1), P. Prendergast (0–1).

Páirc Uí Chaoimh, Cork
Attendance: 30,241
Referee: W. Horgan (Cork)

=== Ulster Senior Hurling Championship ===
Semi-finals		Final
		Antrim	2–16
Down	6–07	Down	0–09
Derry	1–13

June 25, 1989
Semi-Final

Down	6–7 – 1–13	Derry

July 9, 1989
Final

Antrim	2–16 – 0–9	Down
D. McNaughton (2–5), B. Donnelly (0–3), A. McCarry (0–2), J. P. McKillen (0–2), P. McKillen (0–2), T. McNaughton (0–1), D. Armstrong (0–1).		B. Coulter (0–3), C. Mageen (0–2), B. Coulter (0–2), H. Gilmore (0–1).

Athletic Grounds, Armagh
Referee: P. Delaney (Laois)

== All-Ireland Senior Hurling Championship ==
Quarter-Finals
Antrim	4–14
Kildare	0–07

Semi-Finals
Tipperary	1–17
Galway	2–11
Antrim	4–15
Offaly	1–15

Final
Tipperary	4–24
Antrim	3–09

=== All-Ireland quarter-finals ===
July 23, 1989
Quarter-Final

Antrim	4–14 – 0–7	Kildare
B. Donnelly (2–1), O. McFetridge (1–3), C. Barr (1–2), P. McKillen (0–2), J. McNaughton (0–2), T. McNaughton (0–1), D. McNaughton (0–1), D. Armstrong (0–1), A. McCarry (0–1).		M. Moore (0–4), G. Deering (0–1), G. Ennis (0–1), R. Byrne (0–1).

St. Brigid's Park, Dundalk

=== All-Ireland semi-finals ===
August 6, 1989
Semi-Final

Antrim	4–15 – 1–15	Offaly
A. McCarry (2–4), O. McFetridge (2–3), T. McNaughton (0–2), D. Armstrong (0–2), C. Barr (0–1), D. McKinley (0–1), P. McKillen (0–1), B. Donnelly (0–1).	Report	V. Teehan (1–0), J. Dooley (0–3), P. Delaney (0–3), M. Corrigan (0–3), D. Regan (0–2), D. Pilkington (0–1), R. Mannion (0–1), J. Kelly (0–1), J. Pilkington (0–1).

Croke Park, Dublin
Attendance: 64,127
Referee: G. McClory (Antrim)

August 6, 1989
Semi-Final

Tipperary	1–17 – 2–11	Galway
N. English (0–8), P. Fox (1–2), P. Delaney (0–3), C. Bonnar (0–2), D. Ryan (0–1), M. Cleary (0–1).	Report	É. Ryan (2–1), M. McGrath (0–3), J. Cooney (0–3), G. Burke (0–2), J. Treacy (0–1), M. Coleman (0–1).

Croke Park, Dublin
Attendance: 64,127
Referee: J. Denton (Wexford)

=== All-Ireland Final ===
September 3, 1989
Final

Tipperary	4–24 – 3–9	Antrim
N. English (2–12), D. Ryan (1–3), P. Fox (1–2), J. Leahy (0–3), D. Carr (0–2), M. Cleary (0–2).	Report	B. Donnelly (1–1), O. McFetridge (0–3), A. McCarry (1–0), D. Armstrong (1–0), T. McNaughton (0–2), P. McKillen (0–1), L. McKeegan (0–1), D. McKillop (0–1).

Croke Park, Dublin
Attendance: 65,496
Referee: P. Delaney (Laois)

== Championship statistics ==
=== Top scorers ===
==== Season ====
Rank	Player	County	Tally	Total	Matches	Average
1	Nicky English	Tipperary	4–38	50	4	12.50
2	Adrian Ronan	Kilkenny	1–21	24	3	8.00
2	Mark Corrigan	Offaly	4–12	24	3	8.00
4	Finbarr Delaney	Cork	1–19	23	2	8.00
5	Pat Fox	Tipperary	3–11	20	4	5.00
6	Olcan McFetridge	Antrim	3–9	18	3	6.00
6	Kieran Delahunty	Waterford	1–15	18	4	4.50
8	Aidan McCarry	Antrim	3–7	16	4	4.00
9	Pat Murphy	Waterford	5–0	15	4	3.75
9	Brian Donnelly	Antrim	3–6	15	4	3.75
9	Shane Aherne	Waterford	2–9	15	4	3.75

==== Single game ====
Rank	Player	County	Tally	Total	Opposition
1	Nicky English	Tipperary	2–12	18	Antrim
2	Mark Corrigan	Offaly	3–7	16	Kilkenny
3	Joe Hennessy	Kerry	3–5	14	Limerick
3	Finbarr Delaney	Cork	1–11	14	Waterford
5	Nicky English	Tipperary	0–13	13	Waterford
5	Adrian Ronan	Kilkenny	1–10	13	Westmeath
7	Nicky English	Tipperary	2–5	11	Limerick
7	Danny McNaughton	Antrim	2–5	11	Down
9	M. J. Ryan	Dublin	1–7	10	Laois
10	Gary Kirby	Limerick	1–6	9	Kerry
10	Pat Murphy	Waterford	3–0	9	Cork

== Broadcasting ==
The following matches were broadcast live on television in Ireland on RTÉ. In the United Kingdom Channel 4 broadcast live coverage of the All-Ireland final. Highlights of a number of other games were shown on The Sunday Game.

Round	RTÉ	Channel 4
Munster final	Tipperary vs Waterford	
All-Ireland semi-finals	Antrim vs Offaly; Tipperary vs Galway	
All-Ireland final	Tipperary vs Antrim	Tipperary vs Antrim
