= List of Tipperary county hurling team seasons =

== Overview ==
Tipperary were one of the few counties that contested the first championship in 1887. Every year since then, they have contested in the Munster and All-Ireland Championship.

- Notes:
- There were no provincial championships played in 1887, rather an open draw.
- The championship of 1888 was unfinished.
- NOTE: In 1911, Munster Champions Limerick refused to play Kilkenny in the All-Ireland final, Tipp took their place.
- NOTE: The first league championship was in 1926.
- NOTE: The 1926-27 league was not played.
- NOTE: The 1931-32 league was not played.
- NOTE: Foot and Mouth kept Tipp from playing the 1941 championship. They played the real Munster final, beating Cork later in the year. A makeshift Munster final was made for the time being.
- NOTE: Between 1942 and 1945, the league was cancelled due to the war.

Season	All-Ireland Championship	Munster Championship	National Hurling League	Top SHC scorer	Coach(es)
1887	Winner				
1888					
1889		Semi-finalist			
1890		Semi-finalist			
1891		Quarter-finalist			
1892		Quarter-finalist			
1893		Quarter-finalist			
1894		Runner-up			
1895	Winner	Winner			
1896	Winner	Winner			
1897		Semi-finalist			
1898	Winner	Winner			
1899	Winner	Winner			
1900	Winner	Winner			
1901		Runner-up			
1902		Quarter-final			
1903		Semi-final			
1904		Quarter-final			
1905		Runner-up			
1906	Winner	Winner			
1907		Semi-final			
1908	Winner	Winner			
1909	Runner-up	Winner			
1910		Semi-final			
1911	Runner-up	Runner-up			
1912		Runner-up			
1913	Runner-up	Winner			
1914		Quarter-finalist			
1915		Quarter-finalist			
1916	Winner	Winner			
1917	Runner-up	Winner			
1918		Semi-finalist			
1919		Semi-finalist			
1920		Semi-finalist			
1921		Runner-up			
1922	Winner	Winner			
1923		Runner-up			
1924	Semi-finalist	Winner			
1925	Winner	Winner			
1926		Runner-up	Group stage		
1927		Semi-finalist			
1928		Semi-finalist	Winner		
1929		Semi-finalist	Runner-up		
1930	Winner	Winner	Group stage		
1931		Semi-finalist	Runner-up		
1932		Quarter-finalist			
1933		Semi-finalist	Group stage		
1934		Quarter-finalist	Group stage		
1935		Runner-up	Group stage		
1936		Runner-up	Group stage		
1937	Winner	Winner	Group stage		
1938		Semi-finalist	Runner-up		
1939		Quarter-finalist	Group stage		
1940		Quarter-finalist	Runner-up		
1941		Winner	Group stage		
1942		Runner-up			
1943		Quarter-finalist			
1944		Semi-finalist			
1945	'|Winner	'|Winner			
1946		Semi-finalist	Group stage		
1947		Semi-finalist	Semi-finalist		
1948		Quarter-finalist	Runner-up		
1949	Winner	Winner	Winner		
1950	Winner	Winner	Winner		
1951	Winner	Winner	Group stage		
1952		Runner-up	Winner		
1953		Runner-up	Runner-up		
1954		Runner-up	Winner		
1955		Semi-finalist	Winner		
1956		Semi-finalist	Runner-up		
1957		Semi-finalist	Winner		
1958	Winner	Winner	Group stage		
1959		Semi-finalist	Winner		
1960	Runner-up	Winner	Winner		
1961	Winner	Winner	Winner		
1962	Winner	Winner	Group stage		
1963		Runner-up	Runner-up		
1964	Winner	Winner	Winner		
1965	Winner	Winner	Winner		
1966		Quarter-finalist	Runner-up (Home Final)		
1967	Runner-up	Winner	Winner		
1968	Runner-up	Winner	Winner		
1969		Runner-up	Semi-finalist		
1970		Runner-up	Semi-finalist		
1971	Winner	Winner	Runner-up		
1972		Semi-finalist	Semi-finalist		
1973		Runner-up	Semi-finalist		
1974		Semi-finalist	Semi-finalist		
1975		Semi-finalist	Runner-up		
1976		Semi-finalist	Group stage		
1977		Quarter-finalist	Semi-finalist		
1978		Quarter-finalist	Group stage		
1979		Semi-finalist	Winner		
1980		Semi-finalist	Semi-finalist		
1981		Semi-finalist	Quarter-finalist		
1982		Quarter-finalist	Quarter-finalist		
1983		Semi-finalist	Group stage		
1984		Runner-up	Semi-finalist		
1985		Runner-up	Group stage		
1986		Semi-finalist	Group stage		Tony Wall
1987	Semi-finalist	Winner	Semi-finalist		'Babs' Keating
1988	Runner-up	Winner	Winner		'Babs' Keating
1989	Winner	Winner	Runner-up		'Babs' Keating
1990		Runner-up	Group stage		'Babs' Keating
1991	Winner	Winner	Semi-finalist		'Babs' Keating
1992		Semi-finalist	Runner-up		'Babs' Keating
1993	Semi-finalist	Winner	Semi-finalist		'Babs' Keating
1994		Quarter-finalist	Winner		'Babs' Keating
1995		Semi-finalist	Group stage		Len Gaynor
1996		Runner-up	Runner-up		Len Gaynor
1997	Runner-up	Runner-up	Semi-finalist		Len Gaynor
1998		Semi-finalist	Group stage		Len Gaynor
1999		Semi-finalist	Winner		Nicky English
2000	Quarter-finalist	Runner-up	Runner-up		Nicky English
2001	Winner	Winner	Winner	Eoin Kelly (0-23)	Nicky English
2002	Semi-finalist	Runner-up	Semi-finalist	Eoin Kelly (2-39)	Nicky English
2003	Semi-finalist	Quarter-finalist	Runner-up	Eoin Kelly (2-30)	Michael Doyle
2004	Qualifiers (Round 3)	Semi-finalist	Round 8	Eoin Kelly (2-20)	Ken Hogan
2005	Quarter-finalist	Runner-up	Round 8	Eoin Kelly (1-35)	Ken Hogan
2006	Quarter-finalist	Runner-up	Semi-finalist	Eoin Kelly (3-38)	'Babs' Keating
2007	Quarter-finalist	Semi-finalist	Quarter-finalist	Eoin Kelly (1-20)	'Babs' Keating
2008	Semi-finalist	Winner	Winner	Eoin Kelly (1-21)	Liam Sheedy
2009	Runner-up	Winner	Runner-up	Lar Corbett (6-7)	Liam Sheedy
2010	Winner	Quarter-finalist	Group stage	Eoin Kelly (1-33)	Liam Sheedy
2011	Runner-up	Winner	Group stage	Eoin Kelly (4-30)	Declan Ryan
2012	Semi-final	Winner	Semi-final	Pa Bourke (2-30)	Declan Ryan
2013	Qualifiers	Semi-final	Runner-Up	John O'Dwyer (1-6)	Eamon O'Shea
2014	Runner-Up	Semi-final	Runner Up	Séamus Callanan (9-50)	Eamon O'Shea
2015	Semi-final	Winner	Semi-final	Séamus Callanan (5-20)	Eamon O'Shea
