= 2000 Tipperary county hurling team season =

Tipperary county hurling team
2000 season
Manager	Nicky English
All-Ireland SHC	Quarter-final
Munster SHC	Finalists
National League	Finalists
- Top scorer
- Highest SHC attendance
- Lowest SHC attendance
Standard colours

In 2000 Tipperary competed in the National Hurling League and the Munster and All-Ireland championships. It was Nicky English's second year in charge of the team with Tommy Dunne also in his second year as team captain. Finches continued as sponsors of Tipperary GAA.

== National Hurling League ==
=== Division 1B Table ===
Pos	Team	Pld	W	D	L	Diff	Pts	Notes
1	Tipperary	6	5	0	1	47	10	Division 1 runners-up
2	Waterford	6	5	0	1	12	10	
3	Kilkenny	6	4	0	2	30	8	
4	Cork	6	3	0	3	39	6	
5	Wexford	6	3	0	3	11	6	
6	Laois	6	1	0	5	-72	2	
7	Derry	6	0	0	6	-67	0	

=== Group stage ===
27 February 2000 Round 2	Tipperary	5-20 - 1-12	Derry	Semple Stadium, Thurles
	E O'Neill 1-5, M O'Leary 1-3, P O'Brien 1-3, P Shelley 1-1, P Ryan 1-1, T Dunne 0-4, A Moloney 0-1, J Carroll 0-1, E Enright 0-1.		G McGonagle 0-6, J o'Dwyer 1-1, O Collins 0-4, M Collins 0-1.	Referee: S McMahon (Clare)

12 March 2000 Round 3	Wexford	1-15 - 0-20	Tipperary	Bellefield Park, Enniscorthy
	C McGrath 0-9, D Fitzhenry 1-1, M Jordan 0-2, J Lawlor 0-1, L Dunne 0-1, R McCarthy 0-1.		E O'Neill 0-6, M O'Leary 0-5, G Maguire 0-3, P Kelly 0-2, B Cummins 0-1, A Moloney 0-1, P Shelly 0-1, T Dunne 0-1.	Attendance: 5,000; Referee: P O'Connor (Limerick)

26 March 2000 Round 4	Tipperary	2-9 - 2-14	Kilkenny	Semple Stadium, Thurles
	T Dunne 2-4, E O'Neill 0-2, P Shelly 0-2, A Moloney 0-1.		H Shefflin 0-10, E Brennan 2-3, N Moloney 0-1.	Referee: P O'Connor (Limerick)

2 April 2000 Round 5	Cork	1-12 - 2-11	Tipperary	Páirc Uí Chaoimh, Cork
	N Ronan 1-1, M O'Connell 0-3, B O'Connor 0-2, M Laners 0-1, T McCarthy 0-1, S McGrath 0-1, J Deane 0-1, A Browne 0-1, K Murray 0-1.		T Dunne 1-3, M O'Leary 0-4, G Maguire 1-0, A Moloney 0-2, E O'Neill 0-1, P Shelly 0-1.	Attendance: 10,000; Referee: K McMahon (Clare)

8 April 2000 Round 6	Tipperary	5-25 - 0-18	Laois	Semple Stadium, Thurles
	L Cahill 2-2, P O'Brien 2-0, T Dunne 0-6, M O'Leary 0-5, P Shelly 1-1, E O'Neill 0-3, D Ryan 0-3, A Moloney 0-2, P Ryan 0-2, B O'Meara 0-1.		D Cuddy 0-6, F O'Sullivan 0-5, P Cuddy 0-2, D Conroy 0-2, D Rooney 0-2, N Rigney 0-1.	Referee: A Mac Suibhne (Dublin)

16 April 2000 Round 7	Waterford	2-15 - 4-15	Tipperary	Walsh Park, Waterford
	K McGrath 1-5, P Flynn 0-6, A Kirwan 1-0, D Shanahan 0-2, B Walsh 0-1, B Henley 0-1.		P Shelly 2-2, T Dunne 0-7, P O'Brien 1-1, P Ryan 1-0, M O'Leary 0-2, L Cahill 0-1, J Leahy 0-1, D Ryan 0-1.	Referee: S McMahon (Clare)

=== Division 1 Semi-final ===
30 April 2000 Semi-final	Tipperary	2-18 - 0-17	Limerick	Semple Stadium, Thurles
	T Dunne 0-8 (6f, 1'65'), J Leahy 1-2, M O'Leary 1-1, P Shelly, P O'Brien 0-2 each, A Moloney, J Carroll, L Cahill 0-1 each.	Report	M Keane 0-7 (3f), S O'Neill, M O'Brien 0-2 each, M Foley 0-1(f), O Moran 0-1 (f), B Begley, J Cormican, D Hennessy, J Moran 0-1 each.	Referee: P Horan (Offaly)

=== Division 1 Final ===
14 May 2000 Final	Galway	2-18 - 2-13	Tipperary	Gaelic Grounds, Limerick
	R Gantley 0-9 (9f), O Canning 2-0, F Healy 0-4, O Fahy 0-3, M Kerins, D Tierney 0-1 each.	Report	T Dunne 0-5 (4f), P O'Brien 1-2, P Shelley 1-1, M O'Leary 0-3, D Kennedy, R Ryan 0-1 each.	Referee: P O'Connor (Limerick)

== 2000 Munster Senior Hurling Championship ==
2000-05-28
Quarter-Final

Tipperary	0-17 – 0-14	Waterford
T Dunne 0-5 (5f), J Leahy 0-3, D Ryan, P Shelley, M O'Leary 0-2 each, B O'Meara, P Ryan, P O'Brien 0-1 each.	(report)	K McGrath, P Flynn (2f) 0-3 each, P Queally, D Bennett 0-2 each, F Hartley (f), B O'Sullivan, T Browne, D Shanahan 0-1 each.

Páirc Uí Chaoimh, Cork
Referee: D. Murphy (Wexford)

2000-06-11
Semi-Final

Tipperary	2-19 – 1-14	Clare
E. O'Neill (0-7), D. Ryan (1-1), P. Shelly (1-0), J. Leahy (0-3), B. O'Meara (0-3), M. O'Leary (0-3), T. Dunne (0-1), P. O'Brien (0-1).	(Report)	D. Forde (1-1), J. O'Connor (0-3), N. Gilligan (0-2), S. McMahon (0-2), G. Quinn (0-1), B. Quinn (0-1), A. Daly (0-1), E. Flannery (0-1), K. Ralph (0-1), B. Murphy (0-1).

Páirc Uí Chaoimh, Cork
Referee: P. O'Connor (Limerick)

2000-07-02
Final

Cork	0-23 – 3-12	Tipperary
J Deane 0-10 (7f), B O'Connor, S McGrath, A Browne 0-3 each, P Ryan 0-2 (1f), D Barrett, K Murray 0-1 each.	(report)	E O'Neill 1-5 (4f), T Dunne 2-0, B O'Meara, E Enright 0-2 each, J Leahy, P Kelly, L Cahill 0-1 each.

Semple Stadium, Thurles
Referee: P. Horan (Offaly)

== 2000 All-Ireland Senior Hurling Championship ==
23 July
All Ireland Quarter-Final

Galway	1-14 – 0-15	Tipperary
E Cloonan 1-4 (1-1 frees), R Gantley 0-5 (2f, 2'65's), D Canning, A Kerins, O Fahy, J Rabbitte, K Broderick 0-1 each.	(report) (report 2) B Cummins; P Ormonde, P Maher, Michael Ryan; J Carroll, D Kennedy, E Corcoran; Micheal Ryan (Templederry), J Leahy; M O'Leary, E Enright, B O'Meara; T Dunne, P Shelley (0-1), E O'Neill (0-3). Subs: D Fahy for M Ryan, P Kelly (0-1) for Corcoan, A Maloney for Leahy, E Kelly (0-1) for O'Leary, L Cahill for Maloney.	J Leahy 0-4 (3f), E O'Neill 0-3 (2f), B O'Meara, M O'Leary 0-2 each, P Shelley, E Enright, P Kelly, E Kelly 0-1 each.

Croke Park, Dublin
Referee: D. Murphy (Wexford)

== Awards ==
Tipperary won two All Star Awards with both Brendan Cummins and John Carroll winning for the first time.
