= 1999 Tipperary county hurling team season =

Tipperary county hurling team
1999 season
Manager	Nicky English
All-Ireland SHC	Didn't qualify
Munster SHC	Semi-Finals
National League	Winners
- Top scorer
- Highest SHC attendance
- Lowest SHC attendance
Standard colours

Tipperary competed in the 1999 National Hurling League and the 1999 Munster Championship. It was Nicky English's first year in charge of the team with Tommy Dunne also in his first year as team captain. Finches continued as sponsors of Tipperary GAA.

On 2 May, Tipperary won the league title following a 1-14 - 1–10 win over Galway in the final. It was their first league title since 1993-94 and their 17th National League title overall.

On 12 June, Tipperary lost to Clare in the Munster semi-final replay by 1–21 to 1-11 and failed to qualify for the All-Ireland Championship.

== 1999 National Hurling League ==
=== Group 1B table ===
Pos	Team	Pld	W	D	L	Diff	Pts	Notes
1	Tipperary	6	5	0	1	44	10	Division 1 champions
2	Kilkenny	6	5	0	1	30	10	
3	Cork	6	4	0	2	31	8	
4	Laois	6	3	0	3	-16	6	
5	Waterford	6	2	0	4	21	4	
6	Wexford	6	2	0	4	3	4	
7	Down	6	0	0	6	-113	0	Relegation to Division 2

7 March 1999	Down	0-8 - 4-23	Tipperary	McKenna Park, Ballycran
	J McCrickard 0-3, J McCarthy 0-2, N Sands 0-1, S Murray 0-1, M Branniff 0-1.		T Dunne 1-8, P Ormond 1-2, L Cahill 1-1, J Enright 0-4, E Tucker 1-0, W Maher 0-3, B O'Meara 0-2, D Browne 0-2, J Leahy 0-1.	Referee: É Morris (Dublin)

21 March 1999	Tipperary	1-16 - 1-8	Wexford	Semple Stadium, Thurles
	T Dunne 0-9, D Browne 1-1, L Cahill 0-2, E Tucker 0-1, E Enright 0-1, J Leahy 0-1, P Ormonde 0-1.		P Codd 1-6, R McCarthy 0-1, A Fenlon 0-1.	Referee: S McMahon (Clare)

28 March 1999	Kilkenny	3-14 - 1-13	Tipperary	Nowlan Park, Kilkenny
	N Moloney 1-3, H Shefflin 0-6, B McEvoy 1-1, K O'Shea 1-1, DJ Carey 0-2, A Comerford 0-1.		T Dunne 0-5, P Shelly 1-1, L Cahill 0-3, E Tucker 0-2, W Maher 0-1, E O'Neill 0-1.	Referee: P O'Connor (Limerick)

4 April 1999	Tipperary	1-12 - 1-11	Cork	Semple Stadium, Thurles
	L Cahill 1-2, T Dunne 0-5, D Ryan 0-2, E Enright 0-1, J Leahy 0-1, G Maguire 0-1.		J Deane 1-6, S McGrath 0-3, S O'Farrell 0-1, D O'Sullivan 0-1.	Referee: D Murphy (Wexford)

10 April 1999	Laois	1-9 - 2-16	Tipperary	O'Moore Park, Portlaoise
	M Rooney 1-0, N Rigney 0-3, D Cuddy 0-2, Declan Rooney 0-2, E Fennelly 0-2.		T Dunne 0-7, P Shelley 1-1, G Maguire 0-4, B O'Meara 1-0, J Leahy 0-2, D Browne 0-1, D Carr 0-1.	Referee: G Devlin (Armagh)

18 April 1999	Tipperary	1-14 - 0-14	Waterford	Semple Stadium, Thurles
	D Browne 1-1, T Dunne 0-4, L Cahill 0-4, G Maguire 0-2, D Carr 0-1, A Ryan 0-1, P Shelley 0-1.		P Flynn 0-4, K McGrath 0-2, M White 0-2, A Lannon 0-1, D Bennett 0-1, D Shanahan 0-1, B O'Sullivan 0-1, P Queally 0-1, F Hartley 0-1.	Referee: T McIntyre (Antrim)

2 May 1999 Semi-final	Tipperary	0-19 - 1-15	Clare	Gaelic Grounds, Limerick
	T Dunne 0-12, B O'Meara 0-3, D Ryan 0-2, D Carr 0-1, L Cahill 0-1.		J O'Connor 0-7, R O'Hara 1-1, N Gilligan 0-3, A Markham 0-2, C Lynch 0-1, S McMahon 0-1.	Referee: D Murphy (Wexford)

16 May 1999 Final	Tipperary	1-14 - 1-10	Galway	Cusack Park, Ennis
	T Dunne 0-9, J Leahy 1-1, D Carr 0-2, L Cahill 0-1, D Ryan 0-1.		E Cloonan 1-3, A Kerins 0-4, K Broderick 0-3.	Attendance: 13,500; Referee: D Murphy (Wexford)

== 1999 Munster Senior Hurling Championship ==
22 May 1999
Quarter-final

Tipperary	4-29 – 2-6	Kerry
P. Shelley 2-2; T. Dunne 0-7 (0-4 frees); J. Leahy 0-6 (0-2 frees); L. Cahill, D. Ryan 1-2 each; P. Kelly 0-4; B. O'Meara 0-3; C. Gleeson 0-2; E. Enright 0-1.	(report)	P. Cronin, B. O'Sullivan 1-0 each; M. Slattery 0-3 (frees); T. Maunsell 0-3.

Semple Stadium, Thurles
Referee: E. Morris (Dublin).
6 June 1999
Semi-final

Clare	2-12 – 0-18	Tipperary
J. O'Connor 1-2 (0-2 frees); D. Fitzgerald 1-0 penalty; D. Forde 0-3; N. Gilligan 0-2; A. Markham, S. McMahon, C. Lynch, B. Murphy and C. Clancy 0-1 each.	(report)	T. Dunne 0-7 (0-3 frees, 0-2 7 seventies); L. Cahill 0-3; P. Shelley 0-2; J. Leahy, E. Enright, B. O'Meara, E. Tucker, D. Ryan and P. Kelly 0-1 each.

Páirc Uí Chaoimh, Cork
Referee: D. Murphy (Wexford).

12 June 1999
Semi-final
Replay

Clare	1-21 – 1-11	Tipperary
A. Markham 1-3; S. McMahon 0-6 (0-5 frees); C. Lynch 0-4; B. Murphy 0-3; D. Forde 0-2 frees; J. O'Connor (free), O. Baker and E. Flannery 0-1 each.	(report)	T. Dunne 0-10 (0-9 from frees); D. Ryan 1-0 free; E. Enright 0-1.

Páirc Uí Chaoimh, Cork
Referee: D. Murphy (Wexford).

== Awards ==
Tommy Dunne won Tipperary's only All Star Award and his second after picking up his first in 1997.
