= 2000 National Hurling League =

69th season of the National Hurling League

League details
- Dates: 20 February – 28 May 2000
- Teams: 33

League champions
- Winners: Galway (7th win)
- Captain: Joe Rabbitte
- Manager: Mattie Murphy

League runners-up
- Runners-up: Tipperary
- Captain: Tommy Dunne
- Manager: Nicky English

Other division winners
- Division 2: Meath
- Division 3: Louth

The 2000 National Hurling League, known for sponsorship reasons as the Church & General National Hurling League, was the 69th edition of the National Hurling League (NHL), an annual hurling competition for the GAA county teams. Galway won the league, beating Tipperary in the final.

== Overview ==
=== Division 1 ===
The National Hurling League's top division featured fourteen teams divided into two groups - 1A and 1B. Each group consisted of seven teams. Galway and Limerick topped division 1A while Tipperary and Waterford topped division 1B. Galway finished the league undefeated and were crowned champions after defeating Tipp in the final.

Down at the other end of the tables, Kerry and Derry failed to win a single group game and were paired against each other in the relegation play-off. Derry won that game, thus condemning Kerry to division 2 for the following year.

=== Division 2 ===
Division 2 featured one group of ten teams. Carlow and Meath topped the group and contested the final. Meath won and secured promotion to division 1A for the following year. Tyrone ended the group stage without a single victory and were relegated to division 3 for the following year.

=== Division 3 ===
Division 3 featured one group of nine teams. Louth finished the group stages undefeated and were joined in the final by Longford who recorded just one defeat. Louth won that game and secured promotion to division 2 for the following year.

== Division 1 ==
National Hurling League Division 1
- Season: 2000
- Champions: Galway; 7th National League title Captain: Joe Rabbitte; Manager: Mattie Murphy
- Relegated: Kerry
- Matches: 46
- Top goalscorer: Fergal Healy (8-27)
- Biggest home win: Galway 4-28 - 1-14 Antrim (9 April 2000)
- Biggest away win: Galway 7-14 - 0-14 Kerry (26 March 2000)
- Highest scoring: Tipperary 5-20 - 0-18 Laois (8 April 2000)
- All statistics correct as of 2 January 2017.

Tipperary came into the season as defending champions of the 1999 season. Derry entered Division 1 as the promoted team.

On 14 May 2000, Galway won the title following a 2-18 to 2-13 win over Tipperary in the final. It was their first league title since 1995-96 and their sixth National League title overall.

Kerry, who lost all of their group stage matches, were relegated from Division 1 after losing the relegation play-off to Derry by 1-21 to 2-4. Meath won Division 2 and secured promotion to the top tier.

Galway's Fergal Healy was the Division 1 top scorer with 8-27.

=== Structure ===
The 14 teams in Division 1 were divided into two groups of seven teams named Division 1A and Division 1B. Each team played all the others in its group once. Two points were awarded for a win and one for a draw. The first two teams in 1A and 1B advanced to the league semi-finals with the top team in Division 1A playing the second team in Division 1B and the second team in Division 1A playing the first in Division 1B. The bottom-placed teams in 1A and 1B faced each other in a play-off to determine which team would be relegated.

=== Division 1A Table ===
Pos	Team	Pld	W	D	L	Diff	Pts	Notes
1	Galway	6	6	0	0	63	12	Division 1 champions
2	Limerick	6	5	0	1	41	10	
3	Offaly	6	4	0	2	18	8	
4	Clare	6	3	0	3	24	6	
5	Dublin	6	2	0	4	-9	4	
6	Antrim	6	1	0	5	-42	2	
7	Kerry	6	0	0	6	-95	0	Relegated to Division 2

=== Group stage ===
20 February 2000 Round 1	Galway	2-15 - 2-11	Offaly	Duggan Park, Ballinasloe
	O Canning 1-4, A Kerins 1-0, O Fahy 0-3, F Healy 0-2, R Gantley 0-2, K Broderick 0-2, M Kerins 0-1, P Walsh 0-1.		C Gath 1-3, Johnny Dooley 0-4, J Troy 1-0, P Mulhare 0-1, J Ryan 0-1, B Murphy 0-1, M Duignan 0-1.	Referee: B Barrett (Tipperary)

20 February 2000 Round 1	Antrim	3-11 - 1-19	Limerick	Casement Park, Belfast
	C Cunning 1-1, A Mort 1-0, J McIntosh 1-0, Greg O'Kane 0-3, S Kelly 0-2, J Connolly 0-2, C Hamill 0-1, M Molloy 0-1, Gary O'Kane 0-1.		M Foley 0-9, D Stapleton 1-1, J Butler 0-3, M O'Brien 0-2, J Moran 0-2, O Moran 0-1, S O'Neill 0-1.	Referee: E Morris (Dublin)

20 February 2000 Round 1	Kerry	1-5 - 2-20	Clare	John Joe O'Sullivan Park, Ballyheigue
	M Dooley 1-0, B Donovan 0-2, M Slattery 0-2, WJ Leen 0-1.		K Ralph 1-7, B Murphy 0-7, F Hegarty 1-0, A Griffin 0-2, L Doyle 0-1, C Lynch 0-1, G Quinn 0-1, E Flannery 0-1.	Referee: S Roche (Tipperary)

27 February 2000 Round 2	Offaly	3-15 - 2-11	Antrim	St. Rynagh's Park, Banagher
	Johnny Dooley 0-7, J Ryan 1-1, C Gath 1-1, M Duignan 1-0, A Hanrahan 0-3, G Hanniffy 0-2, J Troy 0-1.		Greg O'Kane 0-8, J McIntosh 1-1, R McQuillan 1-0, C Magee 0-1, C McCambridge 0-1.	Referee: P Moore (Waterford)

27 February 2000 Round 2	Dublin	3-24 - 3-7	Kerry	Parnell Park, Dublin
	T McGrane 1-10, S Ryan 1-3, D Henry 1-2, K Flynn 0-5, C Brady 0-3, M Fitzsimons 0-1.		M Slattery 0-5, JJ Canty 1-0, JM Dooley 1-0, P Cronin 1-0, I Brick 0-1, WJ Leen 0-1.	Referee: B Kelly (Westmeath)

27 February 2000 Round 2	Clare	2-10 - 2-16	Galway	Hennessy Park, Milltown Malbay
	N Gilligan 2-0, A Markham 0-5, K Ralph 0-2, T Griffin 0-2, O Baker 0-1.		R Gantley 1-8, P Walsh 1-3, O Canning 0-3, A Kerins 0-1, O Fahy 0-1.	Referee: P O'Connor (Limerick)

12 March 2000 Round 3	Galway	2-18 - 1-17	Dublin	Duggan Park, Ballinasloe
	R Gantley 0-10, F Healy 1-4, J Cooney 1-1, O Canning 0-2, O Fahy 0-1.		T McGrane 0-12, C Brady 1-1, D Henry 0-2, G Ennis 0-1, M Fitzsimons 0-1.	Attendance: 1,500; Referee: S Roche (Tipperary)

12 March 2000 Round 3	Limerick	1-20 - 0-14	Offaly	Gaelic Grounds, Limerick
	B Foley 0-9, B Begley 1-3, S O'Neill 0-2, J Moran 0-2, J Cormican 0-1, M O'Brien 0-1, J Foley 0-1, C Smith 0-1.		Johnny Dooley 0-7, M Duignan 0-3, D Kelly 0-1, G Hanniffy 0-1, B Murphy 0-1, J Troy 0-1.	Attendance: 5,000; Referee: M Wadding (Waterford)

12 March 2000 Round 3	Antrim	3-11 - 3-22	Clare	Casement Park, Belfast
	Greg O'Kane 0-4, J McIntosh 1-0, R Donnelly 1-0, C McCambridge 1-0, A Delargy 0-3, C Hamill 0-1, B McFaul 0-1, Gary O'Kane 0-1, C Kelly 0-1.		A Markham 2-1, K Ralph 0-7, C Clancy 0-5, F Hegarty 1-1, C Lynch 0-4, F Flynn 0-2, N Gilligan 0-1, R O'Hara 0-1.	Referee: P Delaney (Laois)

26 March 2000 Round 4	Clare	0-13 - 2-11	Limerick	Hennessy Park, Milltown Malbay
	J O'Connor 0-6, N Gilligan 0-3, R O'Hara 0-2, B Murphy 0-1, J Reddan 0-1.		B Foley 1-2, M Keane 0-5, B Begley 1-0, D Hennessy 0-1, M O'Brien 0-1, O Moran 0-1, S O'Neill 0-1.	Referee: J McDonnell (Tipperary)

26 March 2000 Round 4	Dublin	3-13 - 3-11	Antrim	Parnell Park, Dublin
	T McGrane 0-7, C Brady 1-1, S Duignan 1-0, F Flynn 1-0, D Henry 0-2, M Fitzsimons 0-1, G Ennis 0-1, S Martin 0-1.		Greg O'Kane 1-7, C McCambridge 2-0, A Mort 0-1, J Connolly 0-1, A Delargy 0-1, C Cunning 0-1.	Referee: G Devlin (Armagh)

26 March 2000 Round 4	Kerry	0-14 - 7-14	Galway	Austin Stack Park, Tralee
	M Slattery 0-10, P Cronin 0-2, WJ Leen 0-1, R Gentleman 0-1.		F Healy 5-2, R Gantley 1-6, O Fahey 1-0, O Canning 0-2, J Culkin 0-2, C Moore 0-1, M Kerins 0-1.	Attendance: 100; Referee: S McMahon (Clare)

2 April 2000 Round 5	Antrim	0-15 - 2-6	Kerry	Casement Park, Belfast
	Greg O'Kane 0-8, B McFall 0-2, C Cunning 0-1, J Connolly 0-1, C McCambridge 0-1, A Mort 0-1, A Delargy 0-1.		R Gentleman 1-1, J Maher 1-1, M Slattery 0-2, JJ Canty 0-1, P Cronin 0-1.	Referee: P Ahern (Carlow)

2 April 2000 Round 5	Offaly	2-14 - 2-12	Clare	St. Brendan's Park, Birr
	Johnny Dooley 0-11, J Pilkington 1-1, B Murphy 1-0, P Mulhare 0-2.		E Taaffe 2-1, F Flynn 0-4, R O'Hara 0-2, G Quinn 0-2, D Forde 0-1, K Ralph 0-1, O Baker 0-1.	Referee: S Roche (Tipperary)

2 April 2000 Round 5	Limerick	0-21 - 2-4	Dublin	FitzGerald Park, Kilmallock
	M Keane 0-9, J Butler 0-5, S O'Neill 0-3, B Foley 0-2, B Begley 0-2.		T McGrane 1-3, S Duignan 1-0, N McCaffrey 0-1.	Referee: D Kirwan (Cork)

8 April 2000 Round 6	Kerry	0-9 - 1-26	Limerick	Austin Stack Park, Tralee
	WJ Leen 0-2, P Cronin 0-1, J Maher 0-1, I Brick 0-1, JJ Canty 0-1, M Slattery 0-1, O Diggins 0-1, M Lucid 0-1.		B Begley 1-4, D Hennessy 0-6, B Foley 0-5, D Stapleton 0-2, M Keane 0-2, M O'Brien 0-2, S O'Neill 0-1, T McLaughlin 0-1, J Moran 0-1, B Callinan 0-1, J Foley 0-1.	Referee: G Harrington (Cork)

8 April 2000 Round 6	Galway	4-28 - 1-14	Antrim	Kenny Park, Athenry
	E Cloonan 2-6, F Healy 1-7, A Kerins 1-4, K Broderick 0-3, J Conney 0-3, D Tierney 0-1, R Gantley 0-1, J Culkin 0-1, J Rabbitte 0-1, M Kerins 0-1.		Greg O'Kane 1-5, J Connolly 0-3, A Mort 0-2, A Delargy 0-1, J McIntosh 0-1, K Kelly 0-1, C Hamill 0-1.	Referee: S Roche (Tipperary)

16 April 2000 Round 6	Offaly	3-18 - 1-8	Kerry	St. Brendan's Park, Birr
	P Mulhare 1-3, J Troy 1-3, A Hanrahan 1-3, B Murphy 0-6, J Errity 0-2, J Pilkington 0-1.		O Duggan 1-3, M Slattery 0-3, K O'Sullivan 0-1, B Shanahan 0-1.	Referee: G Devlin (Tyrone)

16 April 2000 Round 7	Limerick	3-17 - 4-19	Galway	Gaelic Grounds, Limerick
	M Keane 1-4, B Begley 1-2, B Foley 1-2, J Foley 0-2, S O'Neill 0-2, M O'Brien 0-1, J Moran 0-1, J Cormican 0-1, J Butler 0-1, C Smith 0-1.		O Canning 2-2, O Fahy 1-2, A Kerins 1-2, R Gantley 0-5, F Healy 0-4, M Kerins 0-3, K Broderick 0-1.	Referee: M Wadding (Waterford)

16 April 2000 Round 7	Clare	3-14 - 1-10	Dublin	Cusack Park, Ennis
	E Taaffe 0-7, D Forde 1-1, T Griffin 1-0, S McNamara 1-0, B Murphy 0-2, R O'Hara 0-2, F Flynn 0-1, G Quinn 0-1.		T McGrane 1-5, D Russell 0-2, D Sweeney 0-1, S Perkins 0-1, S Martin 0-1.	Attendance: 1,000

30 April 2000 Round 7	Dublin	0-16 - 1-19	Offaly	Parnell Park, Dublin
	D Sweeney 0-4, K Flynn 0-3, S Perkins 0-2, M Fitzsimons 0-2, D Russell 0-1, S Martin 0-1, G Flynn 0-1, S McCann 0-1, G Ennis 0-1.		Johnny Dooley 0-11, J Pilkington 1-3, J Troy 0-2, G Hanniffy 0-1, N Claffey 0-1, J Errity 0-1.	Referee: P Dunphy (Kilkenny)

=== Division 1B Table ===
Pos	Team	Pld	W	D	L	Diff	Pts	Notes
1	Tipperary	6	5	0	1	47	10	Division 1 runners-up
2	Waterford	6	5	0	1	12	10	
3	Kilkenny	6	4	0	2	30	8	
4	Cork	6	3	0	3	39	6	
5	Wexford	6	3	0	3	11	6	
6	Laois	6	1	0	5	-72	2	
7	Derry	6	0	0	6	-67	0	

=== Group stage ===
20 February 2000 Round 1	Kilkenny	1-13 - 0-12	Cork	Nowlan Park, Kilkenny
	DJ Carey 1-3, H Shefflin 0-6, K Power 0-2, A Comerford 0-1, P Mullally 0-1.		F McCormack 0-3, M O'Connell 0-2, J Deane 0-2, B O'Connor 0-1, S McGrath 0-1, W Sherlock 0-1, M Landers 0-1, T McCarthy 0-1.	Attendance: 10,000; Referee: D Murphy (Wexford)

20 February 2000 Round 1	Wexford	1-13 - 0-9	Laois	Páirc Uí Shíocháin, Gorey
	C McGrath 0-8, T Dempsey 1-0, M Jordan 0-3, M Storey 0-1, R Guiney 0-1.		J Young 0-3, P Mahon 0-1, C Cuddy 0-1, D Conroy 0-1, J Phelan 0-1, A Bergin 0-1, D Russell 0-1.	Referee: P Horan (Offaly)

20 February 2000 Round 1	Derry	2-11 - 2-18	Waterford	Dean McGlinchey Park, Draperstown
	G McGonigle 0-5, J O'Dwyer 1-1, O Collins 0-2, G Biggs 0-1, K McKeever 0-1, R McCloskey 0-1.		D Bennett 2-3, J Brenner 0-4, P Queally 0-3, P Flynn 0-3, K McGrath 0-2, B Henley 0-1, A Kirwan 0-1, B Walsh 0-1.	Referee: J McLean (Antrim)

27 February 2000 Round 2	Waterford	1-15 - 0-14	Wexford	Walsh Park, Waterford
	P Flynn 0-11, B O'Sullivan 1-0, K McGrath 0-2, D Shanahan 0-1, D Bennett 0-1.		C McGrath 0-6, T Dempsey 0-3, L Dunne 0-1, J Lawlor 0-1, M Byrne 0-1, M Jordan 0-1, M Storey 0-1.	Referee: P Ahern (Carlow)

27 February 2000 Round 2	Laois	0-9 - 3-20	Kilkenny	O'Moore Park, Portlaoise
	J Young 0-6, C Cuddy 0-2, A Coffey 0-1.		H Shefflin 0-10, K O'Shea 2-0, S Grehan 1-3, JP Corcoran 0-2, A Comerford 0-2, J Phelan 0-1, N Moloney 0-1, M Kavanagh 0-1.	Referee: J McDonnell (Tipperary)

27 February 2000 Round 2	Tipperary	5-20 - 1-12	Derry	Semple Stadium, Thurles
	E O'Neill 1-5, M O'Leary 1-3, P O'Brien 1-3, P Shelley 1-1, P Ryan 1-1, T Dunne 0-4, A Moloney 0-1, J Carroll 0-1, E Enright 0-1.		G McGonagle 0-6, J o'Dwyer 1-1, O Collins 0-4, M Collins 0-1.	Referee: S McMahon (Clare)

12 March 2000 Round 3	Wexford	1-15 - 0-20	Tipperary	Bellefield Park, Enniscorthy
	C McGrath 0-9, D Fitzhenry 1-1, M Jordan 0-2, J Lawlor 0-1, L Dunne 0-1, R McCarthy 0-1.		E O'Neill 0-6, M O'Leary 0-5, G Maguire 0-3, P Kelly 0-2, B Cummins 0-1, A Moloney 0-1, P Shelly 0-1, T Dunne 0-1.	Attendance: 5,000; Referee: P O'Connor (Limerick)

12 March 2000 Round 3	Kilkenny	1-13 - 1-15	Waterford	Nowlan Park, Kilkenny
	S Grehan 1-2, H Shefflin 0-4, C Carter 0-3, B McEvoy 0-3, K Power 0-1.		P Flynn 0-9, D Shanahan 1-1, K McGrath 0-3, T Browne 0-2.	Attendance: 16,000

12 March 2000 Round 3	Cork	4-21 - 0-11	Laois	Páirc Uí Chaoimh, Cork
	K Murray 3-1, N Ronan 1-3, B Coleman 0-5, J O'Connor 0-3, M O'Connell 0-3, A Browne 0-2, J Deane 0-2, B O'Connor 0-1, P Ryan 0-1.		J Young 0-5, D Conroy 0-2, B McEvoy 0-2, PJ Peacock 0-1, A Bergin 0-1.	Attendance: 2,750; Referee: B Kelly (Westmeath)

26 March 2000 Round 4	Tipperary	2-9 - 2-14	Kilkenny	Semple Stadium, Thurles
	T Dunne 2-4, E O'Neill 0-2, P Shelly 0-2, A Moloney 0-1.		H Shefflin 0-10, E Brennan 2-3, N Moloney 0-1.	Referee: P O'Connor (Limerick)

26 March 2000 Round 4	Waterford	2-17 - 2-14	Cork	Walsh Park, Waterford
	P Flynn 0-6, K McGrath 0-5, D Bennett 1-1, B Walsh 1-0, M White 0-2, D Shanahan 0-1, T Browne 0-1, A Kirwan 0-1.		S McGrath 1-2, A Browne 0-5, N Ronan 1-0, B O'Connor 0-3, M O'Connell 0-1, B Coleman 0-1, K Murray 0-1, M Landers 0-1.	Attendance: 17,000; Referee: D Murphy (Wexford)

26 March 2000 Round 4	Derry	3-9 - 2-24	Wexford	Emmet Park, Slaughtneil
	O Collins 2-3, G MCGonagle 1-2, D Cassidy 0-3, G Biggs 0-1.		M McGrath 0-7, T Dempsey 1-3, R McCarthy 0-6, A Fenlon 1-0, M Storey 0-3, L Dunne 0-2, G Laffan 0-1, P Redmond 0-1, R Guiney 0-1.	Referee: T McIntyre (Antrim)

2 April 2000 Round 5	Cork	1-12 - 2-11	Tipperary	Páirc Uí Chaoimh, Cork
	N Ronan 1-1, M O'Connell 0-3, B O'Connor 0-2, M Laners 0-1, T McCarthy 0-1, S McGrath 0-1, J Deane 0-1, A Browne 0-1, K Murray 0-1.		T Dunne 1-3, M O'Leary 0-4, G Maguire 1-0, A Moloney 0-2, E O'Neill 0-1, P Shelly 0-1.	Attendance: 10,000; Referee: K McMahon (Clare)

2 April 2000 Round 5	Laois	1-14 - 2-13	Waterford	O'Moore Park, Portlaoise
	D Cuddy 0-7, L Tynan 1-0, J Young 0-2, D Rooney 0-2, D Conroy 0-1, F O'Sullivan 0-1.		P Flynn 0-6, M White 1-1, A Kirwan 1-1, D Bennett 0-3, J Brenner 0-1, K McGrath 0-1.	Referee: P Horan (Offaly)

2 April 2000 Round 5	Kilkenny	3-12 - 1-9	Derry	Nowlan Park, Kilkenny
	JP Corcoran 1-4, H Shefflin 1-3, E Brennan 1-0, C Brennan 0-1, A Cummins 0-1, D Byrne 0-1, P Larkin 0-1, J Power 0-1.		O Collins 0-4, M Collins 1-0, J O'Dwyer 0-2, R McCloskey 0-1, S McCarthy 0-1, D Cassidy 0-1.	Referee: J Kelly (Wexford)

8 April 2000 Round 6	Tipperary	5-25 - 0-18	Laois	Semple Stadium, Thurles
	L Cahill 2-2, P O'Brien 2-0, T Dunne 0-6, M O'Leary 0-5, P Shelly 1-1, E O'Neill 0-3, D Ryan 0-3, A Moloney 0-2, P Ryan 0-2, B O'Meara 0-1.		D Cuddy 0-6, F O'Sullivan 0-5, P Cuddy 0-2, D Conroy 0-2, D Rooney 0-2, N Rigney 0-1.	Referee: A Mac Suibhne (Dublin)

9 April 2000 Round 6	Wexford	3-14 - 2-11	Kilkenny	O'Kennedy Park, New Ross
	C McGrath 1-7, M Storey 0-4, G Laffan 1-0, R McCarthy 1-0, R Quigley 0-1, T Dempsey 0-1, M Jordan 0-1.		H Shefflin 1-6, K Power 1-0, A Comerford 0-3, P Larkin 0-1, P O'Neill 0-1.	Referee: P O'Connor (Limerick)

9 April 2000 Round 6	Derry	0-12 - 4-18	Cork	Celtic Park, Derry
	G McGonagle 0-4, D Cassidy 0-2, O Collins 0-2, R McCloskey 0-2, J O'Dwyer 0-1, G Biggs 0-1.		K Murray 3-2, J Deane 0-7, N Ronan 1-1, P Ryan 0-3, J O'Connor 0-3, F McCormack 0-1, M O'Connell 0-1.	Referee: E Morris (Dublin)

16 April 2000 Round 7	Waterford	2-15 - 4-15	Tipperary	Walsh Park, Waterford
	K McGrath 1-5, P Flynn 0-6, A Kirwan 1-0, D Shanahan 0-2, B Walsh 0-1, B Henley 0-1.		P Shelly 2-2, T Dunne 0-7, P O'Brien 1-1, P Ryan 1-0, M O'Leary 0-2, L Cahill 0-1, J Leahy 0-1, D Ryan 0-1.	Referee: S McMahon (Clare)

16 April 2000 Round 7	Laois	0-14 - 1-10	Derry	O'Moore Park, Portlaoise
	J Young 0-5, N Rigney 0-4, F O'Sullivan 0-3, Declan Rooney 0-1, O Dowling 0-1.		G McGonagle 1-5, O Collins 0-5.	Referee: J Sexton (Limerick)

16 April 2000 Round 7	Cork	4-16 - 2-14	Wexford	Páirc Uí Chaoimh, Cork
	B O'Connor 2-3, N Ronan 1-2, P Ryan 0-5, S McGrath 1-1, F McCormack 0-1, M O'Connell 0-1, J O'Connor 0-1, B Coleman 0-1, K Murray 0-1.		M Storey 1-2, C McGrath 0-4, M Jordan 1-0, G Laffan 0-3, R Guiney 0-2, T Dempsey 0-1, P Codd 0-1, A Fenlon 0-1.	Referee: B Kelly (Westmeath)

=== Relegation play-off ===
29 April 2000 Final	Derry	1-21 - 2-4	Kerry	Parnell Park, Dublin
	J O'Dwyer 1-3; G McGonigle 0-6 (0-5 frees); G Biggs 0-5; D Doherty, M Conway, N Mullan (both 65s) 0-2 each; K McKeever 0-1.	Report	B Shanahan 1-1; S Morris 1-0; C Walsh 0-2; J Maher 0-1.	Referee: A Mac Suibhne (Dublin)

=== Division 1 Semi-finals ===
30 April 2000 Semi-final	Galway	2-15 - 1-15	Waterford	Semple Stadium, Thurles
	F Healy 1-4, O Fahy 1-3, R Gantley 0-3 (f), O Canning 0-2, A Kerins, J Rabbitte, K Broderick 0-1 each.	Report	D Bennett 0-7, (5f, 1 45) M White 1-1, K McGrath 0-4, F Hartley, J Brenner, D Shanahan 0-1 each.	Referee: D Murphy (Wexford)

30 April 2000 Semi-final	Tipperary	2-18 - 0-17	Limerick	Semple Stadium, Thurles
	T Dunne 0-8 (6f, 1'65'), J Leahy 1-2, M O'Leary 1-1, P Shelly, P O'Brien 0-2 each, A Moloney, J Carroll, L Cahill 0-1 each.	Report	M Keane 0-7 (3f), S O'Neill, M O'Brien 0-2 each, M Foley 0-1(f), O Moran 0-1 (f), B Begley, J Cormican, D Hennessy, J Moran 0-1 each.	Referee: P Horan (Offaly)

=== Division 1 Final ===
14 May 2000 Final	Galway	2-18 - 2-13	Tipperary	Gaelic Grounds, Limerick
	R Gantley 0-9 (9f), O Canning 2-0, F Healy 0-4, O Fahy 0-3, M Kerins, D Tierney 0-1 each.	Report	T Dunne 0-5 (4f), P O'Brien 1-2, P Shelley 1-1, M O'Leary 0-3, D Kennedy, R Ryan 0-1 each.	Referee: P O'Connor (Limerick)

=== Scoring statistics ===
Top scorers overall

Rank	Player	Team	Tally	Total	Matches	Average
1	Fergal Healy	Galway	8-27	51	7	7.28
2	Rory Gantley	Galway	2-44	50	8	6.25
3	Tommy Dunne	Tipperary	3-38	47	8	5.87
4	Tomás McGrane	Dublin	3-37	46	5	9.20
5	Henry Shefflin	Kilkenny	2-39	45	6	7.50
6	Chris McGrath	Wexford	1-41	44	6	7.33
7	Gregory O'Kane	Antrim	2-35	41	6	8.83
7	Paul Flynn	Waterford	0-41	41	7	5.85
9	Johnny Dooley	Offaly	0-40	40	5	8.00
10	Geoffrey McGonagle	Derry	2-28	34	6	5.66

Top scorers in a single game

Rank	Player	Team	Tally	Total	Opposition
1	Fergal Healy	Galway	5-02	17	Kerry
2	Tomás McGrane	Dublin	1-10	13	Kerry
3	Eugene Cloonan	Galway	2-06	12	Antrim
3	Tomás McGrane	Dublin	0-12	12	Galway
5	Kevin Murray	Cork	3-02	11	Derry
5	Rory Gantley	Galway	1-08	11	Clare
5	Johnny Dooley	Offaly	0-11	11	Clare
5	Johnny Dooley	Offaly	0-11	11	Dublin
5	Paul Flynn	Waterford	0-11	11	Wexford
10	Kevin Murray	Cork	3-01	10	Laois
10	Tommy Dunne	Tipperary	2-04	10	Kilkenny
10	Ken Ralph	Clare	1-07	10	Kerry
10	Gregory O'Kane	Antrim	1-07	10	Dublin
10	Fergal Healy	Galway	1-07	10	Antrim
10	Chris McGrath	Wexford	1-07	10	Kilkenny
10	Rory Gantley	Galway	0-10	10	Dublin
10	Henry Shefflin	Kilkenny	0-10	10	Tipperary
10	Michael Slattery	Kerry	0-10	10	Galway
10	Henry Shefflin	Kilkenny	0-10	10	Laois

=== Miscellaneous ===
- Waterford's round 2 defeat of Wexford is their first home league defeat of their southeast neighbours since 1963.

== Division 2 ==
National Hurling League Division 2
- Season: 2000
- Champions: Meath; 4th Division 2 title
- Relegated: Tyrone
- Matches: 44
- All statistics correct as of 10 April 2017.

Down and Armagh entered Division 2 as the respective relegated and promoted teams from the other divisions.

On 28 May 2000, Meath won the title following a 5-14 to 2-10 win over Carlow in the final.

Tyrone, who lost all of their group stage matches, were relegated from Division 2.

=== Division 2 table ===
Pos	Team	Pld	W	D	L	Pts	Notes
1	Meath	9	8	0	1	16	Division 2 champions
2	Carlow	9	8	0	1	16	Division 2 runners-up
3	Westmeath	9	7	0	2	14	
4	Down	9	5	1	3	11	
5	Kildare	8	4	1	3	9	
6	Wicklow	8	4	0	4	8	
7	London	9	3	0	6	6	
8	Roscommon	9	2	0	7	4	
9	Armagh	8	1	0	7	2	
10	Tyrone	8	0	0	8	0	Relegated to Division 3

=== Group stage ===
20 February 2000	London	3-7 - 5-13	Westmeath	Emerald GAA Grounds, Ruislip
	F Horgan 1-2, T Maloney 1-1, B Keane 1-0, D Browne 0-2, D Duane 0-1, B Crowe 0-1.		B Kennedy 4-2, S McLoughlin 1-2, P Williams 0-2, O Devine 0-2, J Gavigan 0-2, D Hatton 0-1, R Galvin 0-1, A Mitchell 0-1.	Referee: P Dunphy (Kilkenny)

20 February 2000	Carlow	3-13 - 2-6	Roscommon	Dr. Cullen Park, Carlow
	P Coady 1-8, M Ryan 1-1, C Cody 1-1, D Roberts 0-2, D Byrne 0-1.		C Kelly 0-4, P Lyons 1-0, M Connaughton 1-0, B Sweeney 0-1, L Murray 0-1.	Referee: P Delaney (Laois)

20 February 2000	Meath	4-14 - 0-2	Armagh	St. Loman's Park, Trim
	N Reilly 3-2, N Horan 0-6, R Dorran 0-4, M Cole 1-0, J Mitchell 0-2.		G McCann 0-2.	Referee: M Bodkin (Galway)

20 February 2000	Down	2-16 - 1-10	Wicklow	McKenna Park, Ballycran
	T Coulter 0-6, N Sands 1-1, M Branniff 1-1, J McGrattan 0-4, G Savage 0-1, P Monan 0-1, G Gordan 0-1, M Mallon 0-1.		J Keogh 0-7, W O'Gorman 1-0, D Hylands 0-2, D Curran 0-1.	Referee: A Mac Suibhne (Dublin)

20 February 2000	Tyrone	0-4 - 6-24	Kildare
	E Devlin 0-4.		P Reidy 4-2, T Spain 0-7, Conal Byrne 1-3, C Buggy 0-5, Colm Byrne 1-0, J Dempsey 0-3, A McAndrew 0-3, B Byrne 0-2, D Harney 0-1.	Referee: T McIntyre (Antrim)

27 February 2000	Meath	2-23 - 0-12	London	St. Loman's Park, Trim
	N Horan 1-7, R Dorran 1-4, P Donnelly 0-4, D Donnelly 0-2, N Reilly 0-2, T Reilly 0-2, F McMahon 0-1, M Cole 0-1.		T Maloney 0-7, F Horgan 0-2, B Crowe 0-1, B Keane 0-1, D Browne 0-1.	Referee: G Devlin (Armagh)

27 February 2000	Kildare	0-17 - 3-8	Down	Sallins Road, Naas
	T Carew 0-8, T Spain 0-4, B Byrne 0-2, J Dempsey 0-1, C Boran 0-1, C Byrne 0-1.		J McGrattan 1-1, P Braniff 1-1, N Sands 1-0, M Coulter 0-2, M Braniff 0-1, B Braniff 0-1, G Gordon 0-1, P Monan 0-1.	Referee: G Harrington (Cork)

27 February 2000	Wicklow	0-17 - 3-4	Carlow	Pearse Park, Arklow
	D Hyland 0-5, D Curran 0-3, J Keigh 0-3, T McGrath 0-2, J O'Neill 0-1, G Murray 0-1, M Moran 0-1, W O'Gorman 0-1.		D Wall 2-0, J Byrne 1-0, P Keogh 0-1, R Foley 0-1, D Kavanagh 0-1, D Roberts 0-1.	Referee: P Neary (Kilkenny)

12 March 2000	Roscommon	0-7 - 1-20	London	Athleague Sportsfield, Athleague
	M Cunniffe 0-2, T Reddington 0-2, S Sweeney 0-2, A Kelly 0-1.		T Maloney 0-9, F Horgan 0-4, K McGrath 0-4, JJ Shields 1-0, B Crowe 0-2, D Ryan 0-1.	Referee: J Guinan (Kilkenny)

12 March 2000	Westmeath	1-14 - 1-11	Wicklow	Castletown Geoghegan
	B Kennedy 1-1, J Gavigan 0-3, F Shaw 0-2, A Mitchell 0-2, P Williams 0-2, D McCormack 0-1, B Williams 0-1, P Clarke 0-1, S McLoughlin 0-1.		T McGrath 0-5, D Hyland 0-4, W O'Gorman 1-0, J Keogh 0-2.	Referee: P Horan (Offaly)

12 March 2000	Tyrone	0-7 - 3-16	Meath	Ballygawley
	E Devlin 0-6, J Kerr 0-1.		F McMahon 3-2, M Horan 0-6, J Dorran 0-3, M Cole 0-2, P Donnelly 0-2, S Horan 0-1.	Referee: HP McCusker (Down)

12 March 2000	Down	4-19 - 0-5	Armagh	McKenna Park, Ballycran
	P Braniff 1-5, N Sands 1-5, T Coulter 1-3, G Savage 1-1, B Braniff 0-2, E Trainor 0-1, P Monan 0-1, P Mallon 0-1.		P McCormack 0-5.	Referee: E Morris (Dublin)

12 March 2000	Carlow	2-16 - 1-10	Kildare	Dr. Cullen Park, Carlow
	P Coady 1-7, M Ryan 1-0, J Kavanagh 0-3, J Byrne 0-2, J Nevin 0-1, R Foley 0-1, B Lawler 0-1, D Wall 0-1.		T Carew 0-5, J Dempsey 1-0, C Byrne 0-3, J Ryan 0-1, C Buggy 0-1.	Referee: D Kirwan (Cork)

26 March 2000	Tyrone	0-9 - 0-18	London	Carrickmore
	D McCallion 0-5, P Kerr 0-2, O Kerr 0-1, R O'Neill 0-1.		T Maloney 0-7, B Keane 0-5, F Horgan 0-3, B Crowe 0-1, D Dunne 0-1, P McManus 0-1.	Referee: J McLean (Antrim)

26 March 2000	Wicklow	3-10 - 1-10	Roscommon	Pearse Park, Arklow
	J Keogh 1-6, J O'Neill 2-1, D Hyland 0-3.		C Kelly 1-6, J mannion 0-1, M Mullery 0-1, S Sweeney 0-1, D Lohan 0-1.	Referee: L Doyle (Wexford)

26 March 2000	Kildare	1-18 - 3-13	Westmeath	Sallins Road, Naas
	T Carew 0-13, J Dempsey 1-0, B Byrne 0-2, C Byrne 0-2, P Reidy 0-1.		A Mitchel 0-6, F Shaw 1-2, J Gavigan 1-2, O Devine 1-0, B Williams 0-1, S McLoughlin 0-1, D McCormack 0-1.	Referee: J Sexton (Cork)

26 March 2000	Meath	1-15 - 1-11	Down	St. Loman's Park, Trim
	N Horan 1-7, N Reilly 0-3, J Mitchell 0-1, R Dorran 0-1, M Cole 0-1, D Murray 0-1, P Donnelly 0-1.		M Coulter 0-5, P Mallon 1-1, G Savage 0-2, B Braniff 0-1, P McCabe 0-1, P Braniff 0-1.	Referee: P Delaney (Laois)

26 March 2000	Armagh	1-6 - 1-14	Carlow	Keady
	P McCormack 0-5, R Digby 1-0, M Lennon 0-1.		P Coady 0-8, M Ryan 1-1, D Kavanagh 0-2, R Foley 0-1, D Wall 0-1, J Byrne 0-1.	Referee: E Morris (Dublin)

2 April 2000	London	1-11 - 3-17	Wicklow	Emerald GAA Grounds, Ruislip
	T Maloney 1-9, A Heaney 0-1, C Heaney 0-1.		J Keogh 0-7 (6f), J O'Neill, MJ O'Neill, S O'Neill 1-0 each, D Curran, D Hyland 0-3 each, M Moran 0-2, G Murray, D Moran 0-1 each.	Referee: P Healy

2 April 2000	Westmeath	2-13 - 1-9	Armagh	Castletown Geoghegan
	D Shaw 0-5, S McLoughlin 1-0, P Clarke 1-0, R Galvin 0-2, P Williams 0-2, O Devine 0-1, J Gavigan 0-1, M Carley 0-1, A Devine 0-1.		P McCormack 0-5, G Enright 1-1, M Gillespie 0-2, R Digby 0-1.	Referee: HP McCusker (Down)

2 April 2000	Carlow	0-20 - 1-16	Meath	Dr. Cullen Park, Carlow
	P Coady 0-9, M Ryan 0-3, J Byrne 0-3, P Joran 0-1, J Kavanagh 0-1, D Roberts 0-1, R Foley 0-1, J Nevin 0-1.		N Reilly 1-4, N Horan 0-3, D Donnelly 0-3, R Dorran 0-2, M Cole 0-2, M Healy 0-1, J Mitchell 0-1.	Referee: P Dunphy (Kilkenny)

2 April 2000	Down	9-25 - 0-4	Tyrone	St. Patrick's Park, Portaferry
	E Trainor 3-3, P Braniff 2-6, B Coulter 1-6, N Sands 2-2, B Braniff 0-3, P Mallon 1-0, G Gordon and M Coulter 0-2 each, G Savage and 0-1.		J Kerr 0-3, D McCallion 0-1.

2 April 2000	Roscommon	4-4 - 2-16	Kildare	Athleague Sportsfield, Athleague
	S Sweeney 1-1, M Cunniffe 1-1, M Mulry 1-0, D Lohan 1-0, T Galvin 0-1, C Kelly 0-1.		T Carew 0-8, C Boran 1-2, T Spain 0-4, L Maloney 1-0, J Dempsey 0-1, P Reidy 0-1.	Referee: P Neary (Kilkenny)

8 April 2000	Armagh	0-11 - 3-14	Roscommon	Keady
	P McCormack 0-5, G Enright 0-4, J Moane 0-1, P McArdle 0-1.		M Mulry 2-1, C Kelly 0-7, D Lohan 1-0, L Murray 0-3, L Casey 0-1, T Galvin 0-1, E Gormley 0-1.	Referee: HP McCusker (Down)

9 April 2000	Down	2-21 - 1-7	London	Mitchell Park, Ballygalget

9 April 2000	Meath	1-13 - 2-6	Westmeath	Páirc Tailteann, Navan
	N Horan 0-6, M Healy 1-0, R Dorran 0-1, G O'Neill 0-1, M Gannon 0-1, A O'Neill 0-1, T Reilly 0-1, F McMahon 0-1, M Cole 0-1.		F Shaw 1-2, S McLoughlin 1-1, A Mitchell 0-2, P Clarke 0-1.	Referee: P Delaney (Laois)

9 April 2000	Kildare	3-14 - 1-10	Wicklow	St. Conleth's Park, Newbridge
	T Carew 0-8, T Spain 1-2, J Rayn 1-2, L Maloney 1-0, E Denieffe 0-1, J Dempsey 0-1.		D Hyland 0-5, J O'Neill 1-1, J Keogh 0-3, T Collins 0-1.	Referee: J McGrath (Westmeath)

9 April 2000	Tyrone	2-11 - 1-21	Carlow	Dungannon
	D McCallion 1-9, O Kerr 1-0, P Hughes 0-1, P Kerr 0-1.		M Ryan 1-9, R Foley 0-4, D Roberts 0-3, D Wall 0-2, D Byrne 0-2, J Byrne 0-1.	Referee: JA Gribben (Down)

15 April 2000	London	0-5 - 3-8	Kildare	Emerald GAA Grounds, Ruislip
	T Maloney 0-3, M Malone 0-2.		T Carew 0-5, J Dunphy 1-1, C Boran 1-1, J Ryan 1-0, G Curran 0-1.	Referee: P Moore (Waterford)

16 April 2000	Roscommon	1-9 - 2-11	Meath	Athleague Sportsfield, Athleague
	C Kelly 0-4, E Gormley 1-0, L Casey 0-2, D Lohan 0-1, J Durkan 0-1, T Galvin 0-1.		F McMahon 1-2, M Healy 1-0, P Donnelly 0-2, M Cole 0-2, N Horan 0-2, A O'Neill 0-1, R Dorran 0-1, N Reilly 0-1.	Referee: M Cahill (Tipperary)

16 April 2000	Westmeath	5-20 - 0-2	Tyrone	St. Loman's, Mullingar
	P Clarke 1-6, O Devine 2-2, B Kennedy 1-2, C Murtagh 1-1, A Devine 0-3, F Shaw 0-2, B Murphy 0-1, D Devine 0-1, J Gavigan 0-1, T Cunningham 0-1.		E Devlin 0-2.	Referee: HP McCusker (Down)

16 April 2000	Carlow	2-9 - 0-13	Down	Dr. Cullen Park, Carlow
	M Ryan 1-4, J Kavanagh 1-1, R Foley 0-2, B Murphy 0-1, P Jordan 0-1.		P Braniff 0-7, N Sands 0-3, J McGrattan 0-2, P Mallon 0-1.	Referee: P Neary (Kilkenny)

16 April 2000	Wicklow	3-16 - 0-13	Armagh	Pearse Park, Arklow
	J Keogh 1-7, J O'Neill 1-2, K Furlong 1-1, F Redmond 0-2, G Murray 0-1, D Hyland 0-1, M Moran 0-1, J Murphy 0-1.		P McCormack 0-12, R Digby 0-1.	Referee: L Doyle (Wexford)

30 April 2000	Carlow	2-13 - 2-10	London	Dr. Cullen Park, Carlow
	J Byrne 1-1, P Jordan 1-0, B Murphy 0-3, R Foley 0-3, J Kavanagh 0-2, B Lawlor 0-2, M Ryan 0-2.		K McGrath 1-2, T Maloney 0-4, B Crowe 1-0, P Pardy 0-3, T Lohan 0-1.	Referee: J Sexton (Limerick)

30 April 2000	Tyrone	1-9 - 5-12	Roscommon	Healy Park, Omagh

30 April 2000	Down	2-9 - 3-13	Westmeath	Mitchell Park, Ballygalget

30 April 2000	Meath	1-14 - 0-12	Wicklow	St. Loman's Park, Trim
	G O'Neill 1-1, N Horan 0-4, F McMahon 0-3, A O'Neill 0-3, J Mitchell 0-1, T Reilly 0-1, P Coone 0-1.		M Moran 0-4, J Keogh 0-4, D Hyland 0-2, J Murphy 0-1, J O'Neill 0-1.	Referee: G Devlin (Armagh)

14 May 2000	Roscommon	4-9 - 5-10	Down	Athleague Sportsfield, Athleague

=== Knock-out stage ===
28 May 2000 Final	Meath	5-14 - 2-10	Carlow	Cusack Park, Mullingar
	B Murray 5-1, M Cole, N Horan 0-4 each, N McKeigue 0-2, M Gannon, P Donnelly, F McMahon 0-1 each.	Report	P Coady 0-6, M Farrelly 1-1, P Jordan 1-0, R Foley, D Roberts, J Byrne 0-1 each.	Referee: P Moore (Waterford)

== Division 3 ==
National Hurling League Division 3
- Season: 2000
- Champions: Louth
- All statistics correct as of 10 April 2017.

On 28 May 2000, Louth won the title following a 0-16 to 1-11 win over Longford in the final.

=== Division 3 table ===
Pos	Team	Pld	W	D	L	Pts	Notes
1	Louth	8	7	1	0	15	Division 3 champions
2	Longford	8	7	1	0	15	Division 3 runners-up
3	Sligo	8	4	1	3	9	
4	Mayo	7	4	0	3	8	
5	Leitrim	8	3	1	4	7	
6	Monaghan	8	3	1	4	7	
7	Fermanagh	8	2	0	6	4	
8	Cavan	7	1	1	5	3	
9	Donegal	8	1	0	7	2	

=== Knock-out stage ===
28 May 2000 Final	Louth	0-16 - 1-11	Longford	Cusack Park, Mullingar
	D Dunne 0-7 (5f), P Dunne 0-4 (2 `65', 2f), T Corcoran 0-2, E Quigley, P Sharkey, and C Connolly 0-1 each.	Report	M Cassidy 0-6 (5f), C Finucane 1-1, G Ghee 0-2, G Dooley and B Kirby 0-1 each.	Referee: J P Gribben (Down)
