= Brian O'Meara =

Brian O'Meara may refer to:

- Brian O'Meara (rugby union) (born 1976), Irish rugby union footballer
- Brian O'Meara (Kilruane MacDonagh's hurler) (born 1990), Irish hurler for the Tipperary senior team
- Brian O'Meara (Mullinahone hurler) (born 1973), Irish hurler for the Tipperary senior team
