= 2002 Tipperary county hurling team season =

Tipperary county hurling team
2002 season
Manager	Nicky English
All-Ireland SHC	Semi-final
Munster SHC	Finalists
National League	Semi-final
Top scorer	Eoin Kelly (2-39)
Highest SHC attendance	53,385 (v Kilkenny 18 August)
- Lowest SHC attendance
Standard colours

In 2002 Tipperary competed in the National Hurling League and the Munster and All-Ireland championships. It was Nicky English's fourth year in charge of the team with Tommy Dunne also in his forth year as team captain. Finches continued as sponsors of Tipperary GAA.

== National Hurling League ==
=== Division 1B Table ===
Pos	Team	Pld	W	D	L	F	A	Diff	Pts	Notes
1	Cork	5	4	1	0	6-90	5-60	33	9	Division 1 runners-up
2	Limerick	5	4	1	0	8-77	6-54	29	9	
3	Tipperary	5	3	0	2	10-83	9-54	35	6	
4	Wexford	5	3	0	2	10-73	8-71	8	6	
5	Offaly	5	2	0	3	9-61	9-76	-15	4	
6	Derry	5	0	0	5	6-37	12-104	-85	0	

10 March 2002 Round 2	Tipperary	1-12 - 2-13	Limerick	Semple Stadium, Thurles
	E Kelly 0-6, E O’Neill 1-2, L Cahill 0-1, E Enright 0-1, M O’Leary 0-1, P Kelly 0-1.		M Keane 2-7, M Foley 0-3, S Lucey 0-1, B Begley 0-1, S O’Connor 0-1.	Referee: S McMahon (Clare)

18 March 2002 Round 3	Wexford	3-13 - 1-10	Tipperary	Wexford Park, Wexford
	L O’Gorman 1-4, D O’Brien 1-2, B Lambert 0-4, M Jordan 1-0, D Ruth 0-2, R Mallon 0-1.		J O’Brien 1-1, E Kelly 0-3, T Dunne 0-2, J Enright 0-2, L Cahill 0-1, E O’Neill 0-1.	Referee: P Neary (Kilkenny)

24 March 2002 Round 4	Tipperary	5-23 - 0-3	Derry	MacDonagh Park, Nenagh
	M O’Leary 2-4, J O’Brien 2-4, E Kelly 1-5, L Corbett 0-3, J Enright 0-3, T Dunne 0-1, N Morris 0-1, P Kelly 0-1, B O’Meara 0-1.		M Conway 0-1, Gregory Biggs 0-1, Gary Biggs 0-1.	Referee: E Morris (Dublin)

30 March 2002 Round 1 refixture	Offaly	3-8 - 2-21	Tipperary	St. Brendan's Park, Birr
	B Murphy 1-3, G Hanniffy 1-1, Brian Whelahan 1-0, J Dooley 0-3, B Carroll 0-1.		E Kelly 0-9, L Cahill 1-3, J O’Brien 1-2, T Dunne 0-4, J Carroll 0-2, B Dunne 0-1.	Referee: P Dunphy (Kilkenny)

7 April 2002 Round 5	Cork	1-14 - 1-17	Tipperary	Páirc Uí Chaoimh, Cork
	J Deane 1-3, E Collins 0-3, N McCarthy 0-2, A Browne 0-2, S McGrath 0-2, B O’Connor 0-2.		E O’Neill 1-2, M O’Leary 0-4, E Kelly 0-4, T Dunne 0-2, L Cahill 0-2, N Morris 0-1, J Enright 0-1, J O’Brien 0-1.	Referee: P Ahern (Carlow)

14 April 2002 Quarter-final	Tipperary	4-13 - 1-17	Galway	Semple Stadium, Thurles
	E Kelly 0-11, J O'Brien 2-1, L Corbett 1-1, B O’Meara 1-0.	Report	E Cloonan 1-8, J Rabbitte 0-3, D Hayes 0-3, R Murray 0-2, R Gantley 0-1.	Referee: B Kelly (Westmeath)

21 April 2002 Semi-final	Cork	0-21 - 1-10	Tipperary	Páirc Uí Chaoimh, Cork
	B O’Connor 0-6, J O’Connor 0-6, N McCarthy 0-3, K Murphy 0-2, S Gardiner 0-2, D O'Sullivan 0-1, P Ryan 0-1.	Report	E Kelly 1-3, E O’Neill 0-2, L Corbett 0-2, L Cahill 0-1, J Carroll 0-1, T Dunne 0-1.	Referee: D Murphy (Wexford)

== 2002 Munster Senior Hurling Championship ==
19 May
Quarter-Final

Tipperary	1-18 - 2-13	Clare
E. Kelly (1-8), C. Gleeson (0-2), N. Morris (0-2), T. Dunne (0-2), B. O'Meara (0-1), J. O'Brien (0-1), E. O'Neill (0-1), B. Dunne (0-1).	Report	D. Forde (2-0), T. Griffin (0-6), J. Reddan (0-3), J. O'Connor (0-2), T. Carmody (0-1), N. Gilligan (0-1).

Páirc Uí Chaoimh, Cork
Referee: M. Healy (Cork))
2 June
Semi-Final

Tipperary	1-20 - 1-13	Limerick
E. Kelly (0-12), J. Carroll (1-2), B. Dunne (0-2), T. Dunne (0-1), N. Morris (0-1), B. O'Meara (0-1), C. Gleeson (0-1).	Report	M. Keane (0-8), O. Moran (1-0), P. Lawlor (0-2), O. O'Neill (0-1), J. Butler (0-1), B. Foley (0-1).

Páirc Uí Chaoimh, Cork
Referee: A. Mac Suibhne (Dublin))

30 June
Final

Waterford	2-23 - 3-12	Tipperary
P. Flynn (1-6), K. McGrath (0-7), J. Mullane (0-4), T. Browne (1-0), E. Kelly (0-3), D. Bennett (0-1), E. McGrath (0-1), S. Prendergast (0-1).	Report	B. Dunne (2-2), E. Kelly (1-4), T. Dunne (0-2), L. Corbett (0-1), C. Gleeson (0-1), J. Carroll (0-1), B. O’Meara (0-1).

Páirc Uí Chaoimh, Cork
Referee: A. Mac Suibhne (Dublin))

== 2002 All-Ireland Senior Hurling Championship ==
13 July
Round 2

Tipperary	2-19 - 1-9	Offaly
B. O'Meara (1-2), J. Carroll (1-1), M. O'Leary (0-4), E. Kelly (0-4), P. Kelly (0-3), T. Dunne (0-2), B. Dunne (0-2), E. O'Neill (0-1).	Report	S. Brown (1-1), S. Whelehan (0-4), R. Hanniffy (0-1), Barry Whelehan (0-1), K. Martin (0-1), B. Carroll (0-1).

O'Moore Park, Portlaoise
Attendance: 20,000
Referee: M. Wadding (Waterford)
28 July
Quarter-final

Tipperary	1-25 - 2-12	Antrim
E. Kelly (0-7), P. Kelly (0-5 (0-1), E. O'Neill (1-1), T. Dunne (0-3), B. Dunne (0-3), J. Carroll (0-2), B. O'Meara (0-2), L. Corbett (0-1), N. Morris (0-1).	Report	L. Watson (1-6), L. Richmond (1-1), P. Richmond (0-2), G. O'Kane (0-2), B. McFall (0-1).

Croke Park, Dublin
Attendance: 41,619
Referee: P. Ahern (Carlow)
18 August
Semi-final

Kilkenny	1-20 - 1-16	Tipperary
H. Shefflin (0-7), J. Coogan (1-1), D. J. Carey (0-4), D. Lyng (0-2), A. Comerford (0-2), M. Comerford (0-1), J. Hoyne (0-1), E. Brennan (0-1), C. Carter (0-1).	Report	E. Kelly (0-4), J. Carroll (1-0), M. O'Leary (0-3), P. Kelly (0-3), E. O'Neill (0-2), T. Dunne (0-1), B. O'Meara (0-1), L. Corbett (0-1), E. Corcoran (0-1).

Croke Park, Dublin
Attendance: 53,385
Referee: A. Mac Suibhne (Dublin)

== Awards ==
Tipperary won two All Star Awards with Paul kelly winning his first and Eoin Kelly winning his second award. Eoin Kelly also won for the second year in a row the Young hurler of the year award
