= 2001 Munster Senior Hurling Championship final =

- Event: 2001 Munster Senior Hurling Championship
Tipperary	Limerick
2-16	1-17
- Date: 1 July 2001
- Venue: Páirc Uí Chaoimh, Cork
- Man of the Match: Tommy Dunne (Tipperary)
- Referee: Pat Horan
- Attendance: 43,500
- Weather: Sunny

The 2001 Munster Senior Hurling Championship final was a hurling match played on 1 July 2001 at Páirc Uí Chaoimh, Cork, County Cork. It was contested by Tipperary and Limerick. Tipperary claimed their first Munster Championship of the decade, beating Limerick on a scoreline of 2–16 to 1–17, a 2-point winning margin. Overall, this was Tipperary's thirty sixth Munster Senior Hurling Championship title. Tipperay had defeated Clare in the semi-final by 0–15 to 0–14 to reach the final, while Limerick had defeated Cork by 1–16 to 1–15 in the quarter-final and Waterford by 4–11 to 2–14 in the semi-final to reach the final. The match was screened live by RTÉ as part of The Sunday Game programme.

== Match ==
=== Details ===
1 July
Final

Tipperary	2-16 – 1-17	Limerick
D. Ryan (1-1), L. Corbett (1-1), M. O'Leary (0-3), B. O'Meara (0-2), E. Enright (0-2), T. Dunne (0-2), E. Kelly (0-2), P. Kelly (0-1), E. O'Neill (0-1), J. O'Brien (0-1).	Report	S. O'Connor (1-3), P. O'Grady (0-5), M. Foley (0-2), C. Carey (0-1), M. O'Brien (0-1), J. Foley (0-1), O. Moran (0-1), J. Butler (0-1), B. Begley (0-1), B. Foley (0-1).

Páirc Uí Chaoimh, Cork
Attendance: 43,500
Referee: P. Horan (Offaly)

== See also ==
- Limerick–Tipperary hurling rivalry
