= Limerick–Tipperary hurling rivalry =

Limerick–Tipperary
- Location: County Limerick; County Tipperary
- Teams: Limerick; Tipperary
- First meeting: 23 March 1895
- Latest meeting: Limerick 5–27 – 0–25 Tipperary 2026 Munster Senior Hurling Championship (24 May 2026)
- Next meeting: TBA

Statistics
- Total meetings: 79
- All-time series (SHC only): Tipperary 38–31 Limerick (10 draws)
- Largest victory: Tipperary 10–9 – 2–1 Limerick

The Tipperary–Limerick fixture was one of the most significant clashes in Munster hurling history, especially in 2007, which Limerick won in the third game in extra-time by 3 points.

== Roots ==
=== History ===
The long standing rivalry is sustained by both teams' consistent success in Munster and All-Ireland Senior Championships. Notable fixtures include 1973 Munster final, the replay matches of the 1996 Munster final, and the three-game series in 2007. More recently Limerick have dominated the fixture, with Tipperary failing to secure a Championship win against them since 2019.

=== Statistics ===
Up to date as of 2024 season

Team	All-Ireland	Provincial	National League	Total
Limerick	12	24	15	51
Tipperary	28	42	19	89
Combined	40	66	34	140

== All time results ==
=== Championship ===
Limerick win
Tipperary win
Drawn game

Date	Winners	Score	Runners-up	Venue	Competition
1895	Tipperary	7–8 : 0–2	Limerick	Kilmallock	MSHC Final
1899	Tipperary	W.O. : Scr	Limerick		MSHC semi-final
1902	Limerick	W.O. : Scr	Tipperary		MSHC semi-final
1904	Tipperary	3–12 : 3–8	Limerick	Tipperary Town	MSHC semi-final
1906	Tipperary	2–12 : 0–4	Limerick	Cork Athletic Grounds	MSHC semi-final
19 November 1911	Limerick	5–3 : 4–3	Tipperary	Cork Athletic Grounds	MSHC final
5 July 1914	Limerick	8–0 : 3–1	Tipperary	Dungarvan	MSHC first round
10 August 1916	Tipperary	4–4 : 2–4	Limerick	Dungarvan	MSHC semi-final
9 August 1917	Tipperary (draw)	3–4 : 3–4	Limerick	Cork Athletic Grounds	MSHC final
7 September 1917	Tipperary	6–4 : 3–1	Limerick	Cork Athletic Grounds	MSHC final replay
7 July 1918	Limerick (draw)	5–2 : 5–2	Tipperary	Limerick	MSHC semi-final
18 August 1918	Limerick	3–2 : 2–2	Tipperary	Cork Athletic Grounds	MSHC semi-final replay
8 August 1920	Limerick	5–7 : 3–3	Tipperary	Riverstown	MSHC semi-final
1922	Tipperary (draw)	2–2 : 2–2	Limerick	Thurles	MSHC final
1922	Tipperary	4–2 : 1–4	Limerick	Limerick	MSHC final replay
1923	Limerick	2–3 : 1–0	Tipperary	Cork Athletic Grounds	MSHC final
5 October 1924	Tipperary	3–1 : 2–2	Limerick	Dungarvan	MSHC final
22 August 1926	Tipperary	6–5 : 4–6	Limerick	Dungarvan	MSHC semi-final
3 July 1927	Limerick	3–4 : 3–1	Tipperary	Cork Athletic Grounds	MSHC first round
3 June 1928	Tipperary	4–2 : 2–6	Limerick	Cork Athletic Grounds	MSHC first round
10 May 1931	Tipperary	3–4 : 0–2	Limerick	Cork Athletic Grounds	MSHC first round
29 May 1932	Limerick	4–2 : 1–5	Tipperary	Cork Athletic Grounds	MSHC first round
11 August 1935	Limerick	5–5 : 1–4	Tipperary	Cork Athletic Grounds	MSHC final
2 August 1936	Limerick	8–5 : 4–6	Tipperary	Thurles	MSHC final
25 July 1937	Tipperary	6–3 : 4–3	Limerick	Cork Athletic Grounds	MSHC final
21 May 1939	Limerick	3–3 : 2–0	Tipperary	Thurles	MSHC first round
15 July 1945	Tipperary	4–3 : 2–6	Limerick	Thurles	MSHC final
16 May 1946	Limerick	3–5 : 2–2	Tipperary	Cork Athletic Grounds	MSHC semi-final
22 June 1947	Limerick	6–8 : 2–3	Tipperary	Cork Athletic Grounds	MSHC semi-final
27 June 1948	Limerick	8–4 : 6–4	Tipperary	Cork Athletic Grounds	MSHC first round
17 July 1949	Tipperary	1–16 : 2–10	Limerick	Cork Athletic Grounds	MSHC final
18 June 1950	Tipperary	4–8 : 0–8	Limerick	Limerick	MSHC first round
8 July 1951	Tipperary	3–8 : 1–6	Limerick	Thurles	MSHC semi-final
1 June 1958	Tipperary	2–10 : 1–5	Limerick	Cork Athletic Grounds	MSHC first round
25 June 1959	Tipperary	2–9 : 1–7	Limerick	Cork Athletic Grounds	MSHC first round
3 July 1960	Tipperary	10–9 : 2–1	Limerick	Cork Athletic Grounds	MSHC first round
1 July 1962	Tipperary	3–12 : 4–9	Limerick	Cork Athletic Grounds	MSHC semi-final
22 July 1962	Tipperary	5–13 : 2–4	Limerick	Cork Athletic Grounds	MSHC semi-final replay
5 June 1966	Limerick	4–12 : 2–9	Tipperary	Cork Athletic Grounds	MSHC first round
22 June 1969	Tipperary	0–14 : 2–5	Limerick	Cork Athletic Grounds	MSHC semi-final
25 July 1971	Tipperary	4–16 : 3–18	Limerick	Fitzgerald Stadium	MSHC final
29 July 1973	Limerick	6–7 : 2–18	Tipperary	Semple Stadium	MSHC final
6 July 1975	Limerick (draw)	2–16 : 3–13	Tipperary	Semple Stadium	MSHC semi-final
20 July 1975	Limerick	0–17 : 1–10	Tipperary	Limerick	MSHC semi-final replay
11 June 1978	Limerick	1–14 : 0–9	Tipperary	Páirc Uí Chaoimh	MSHC first round
7 June 1981	Limerick (draw)	4–10 : 3–13	Tipperary	Semple Stadium	MSHC semi-final
21 June 1981	Limerick	3–17 : 2–12	Tipperary	Limerick	MSHC semi-final replay
5 June 1988	Tipperary	0–15 : 0–8	Limerick	Páirc Uí Chaoimh	MSHC semi-final
11 June 1989	Tipperary	4–18 : 2–11	Limerick	Páirc Uí Chaoimh	MSHC semi-final
10 June 1990	Tipperary	2–20 : 1–17	Limerick	Gaelic Grounds	MSHC semi-final
9 June 1991	Tipperary	2–18 : 0–10	Limerick	Semple Stadium	MSHC semi-final
21 May 1995	Limerick	0–16 : 0–15	Tipperary	Páirc Uí Chaoimh	MSHC semi-final
7 July 1996	Limerick (draw)	0–19 : 1–16	Tipperary	Gaelic Grounds	MSHC final
14 July 1996	Limerick	4–7 : 0–16	Tipperary	Páirc Uí Chaoimh	MSHC final replay
15 June 1997	Tipperary	1–20 : 0–13	Limerick	Semple Stadium	MSHC semi-final
1 July 2001	Tipperary	2–16 : 1–17	Limerick	Páirc Uí Chaoimh	MSHC final
2 June 2002	Tipperary	1–20 : 1–13	Limerick	Páirc Uí Chaoimh	MSHC semi-final
26 June 2004	Tipperary	3–10 : 2–12	Limerick	Gaelic Grounds	AISHC qualifier round 1
15 May 2005	Tipperary (draw)	2–14 : 2–14	Limerick	Semple Stadium	MSHC first round
21 May 2005	Tipperary	2–13 : 0–18	Limerick	Gaelic Grounds	MSHC first round replay
14 May 2006	Tipperary	0–22 : 2–12	Limerick	Semple Stadium	MSHC first round
10 June 2007	Limerick (draw)	1–19 : 1–19	Tipperary	Gaelic Grounds	MSHC semi-final
16 June 2007	Limerick (draw)	1–24 : 2–21	Tipperary	Semple Stadium	MSHC semi-final replay
24 June 2007	Limerick	0–22 : 2–13	Tipperary	Gaelic Grounds	MSHC semi-final replay replay
16 August 2009	Tipperary	6–19 : 2–7	Limerick	Croke Park	AISHC semi-final
27 May 2012	Tipperary	2–20 : 1–19	Limerick	Semple Stadium	MSHC quarter-final
9 June 2013	Limerick	1–18 : 1–15	Tipperary	Gaelic Grounds	MSHC semi-final
1 June 2014	Limerick	2–18 : 2–16	Tipperary	Semple Stadium	MSHC semi-final
21 June 2015	Tipperary	4–23 : 1–16	Limerick	Gaelic Grounds	MSHC semi-final
19 June 2016	Tipperary	3–12 : 1–16	Limerick	Semple Stadium	MSHC semi-final
20 May 2018	Limerick	1–23 : 2–14	Tipperary	Gaelic Grounds	MSHC group stage
16 June 2019	Tipperary	1–22 : 0–21	Limerick	Semple Stadium	MSHC group stage
30 June 2019	Limerick	2–26 : 2–14	Tipperary	Gaelic Grounds	MSHC final
1 November 2020	Limerick	3–23 : 2–17	Tipperary	Páirc Uí Chaoimh	MSHC semi-final
18 July 2021	Limerick	2–29 : 3–21	Tipperary	Páirc Uí Chaoimh	MSHC final
8 May 2022	Limerick	3–21 : 0–23	Tipperary	Gaelic Grounds	MSHC group stage
21 May 2023	Limerick (draw)	0–25 : 0–25	Tipperary	Semple Stadium	MSHC group stage
28 April 2024	Limerick	2–27 : 0–18	Tipperary	Gaelic Grounds	MSHC group stage
21 May 2026	Limerick	5–27 : 0–25	Tipperary	Gaelic Grounds	MSHC group stage

== See also ==
- Limerick GAA
- Tipperary GAA
- Munster Senior Hurling Championship
- All-Ireland Senior Hurling Championship
