= 2001 Tipperary county hurling team season =

Irish hurling season

Tipperary county hurling team
2001 season
| Manager | Nicky English |
| All-Ireland SHC | Winners |
| Munster SHC | Winners |
| National League | Winners |
- Top scorer
- Highest SHC attendance
- Lowest SHC attendance
Standard colours

In 2001 Tipperary competed in the National Hurling League and the Munster and All-Ireland championships. It was Nicky English's third year in charge of the team with Tommy Dunne also in his third year as team captain. Finches continued as sponsors of Tipperary GAA.

Tipperary won the treble of League, Munster and All-Ireland titles.

== National Hurling League ==
=== Division 1B ===
| | Team | Pld | W | D | L | SF | SA | SD | Pts |
|---|---|---|---|---|---|---|---|---|---|
| 1 | Tipperary (C) | 6 | 5 | 1 | 0 | 6-97 | 6-66 | 31 | 10 |
| 2 | Kilkenny | 6 | 4 | 1 | 1 | 8-83 | 2-64 | 37 | 9 |
| 3 | Cork | 6 | 4 | 0 | 2 | 12-88 | 3-72 | 40 | 8 |
| 4 | Wexford ' | 6 | 3 | 0 | 3 | 9-82 | 6-73 | 18 | 6 |
| 5 | Waterford | 6 | 3 | 0 | 3 | 12-83 | 9-73 | 19 | 6 |
| 6 | Derry | 6 | 1 | 0 | 5 | 3-48 | 15-110 | -98 | 2 |
| 7 | Laois | 6 | 0 | 0 | 6 | 2-58 | 14-91 | -79 | 0 |

| 11 February 2001 | Derry | 0-6 - 2-15 | Tipperary | Emmett Park, Slaughneil |
| | O Collins (0-4), P Kelly (0-1), J O'Dwyer (0-1). | Report | L Cahill (0-7), L Corbett (1-1), J Carroll (1-0), B O'Meara (0-3), M O'Leary (0-2), M Ryan (0-1), E Kelly (0-1). | Referee: B Kelly (Westmeath) |

| 18 February 2001 | Tipperary | 1-16 - 1-12 | Wexford | Semple Stadium, Thurles |
| | E O'Neill 0-6 (4f), L Cahill 0-4, L Corbett 1-1, E Corcoran 0-3 (1f, 2 '65), M Ryan, J O'Brien 0-1. | Report | L O'Gorman 1-1, C McGrath (3f), P Codd 0-3 each, L Dunne 0-2 (f), M Jordan, R Stafford, B Goff 0-1. | Referee: P Dunphy (Kilkenny) |

| 1 April 2001 | Tipperary | 5-15 - 2-15 | Waterford | MacDonagh Park, Nenagh |
| | E O'Neill 1-4 (3fs), B O'Meara 2-0, L Cahill 1-2, L Corbett 1-1, E Corcoran 0-4 (all fs), E Enright 0-2, M Ryan 0-1, T Dunne 0-1 ('65). | Report | P Flynn 1-9 (5f), K McGrath 1-1, T Browne 0-2, E Murphy, D Bennett, D Shanahan 0-1 each. | Referee: S McMahon (Clare) |

| 8 April 2001 | Kilkenny | 1-12 - 0-15 | Tipperary | Nowlan Park, Kilkenny |
| | H Shefflin 1-4, A Cummins 0-3, C Brennan 0-1, A Geoghegan 0-1, J Power 0-1, C Carter 0-1, J Coogan 0-1. | Report | E O’Neill 0-5, L Corbett 0-3, L Cahill 0-2, M O’Leary 0-2, E Enright 0-1, T Dunne 0-1, P Kelly 0-1. | Referee: G Harrington (Cork) |

| 15 April 2001 | Tipperary | 0-20 - 2-8 | Cork | Fraher Field, Dungarvan |
| | E Kelly 0-5 (0-2 frees), M O'Leary 0-4, L Cahill and D Ryan 0-3 each, C Gleeson, N Morris, E Enright and J Leahy 0-1 each. P Kelly 0-1 ('65'). | Report | A Browne 2-2, J O'Connor 0-2, M Landers, K Murray and P Ryan 0-1 each. J Deane 0-1 (free). | Referee: P Horan (Offaly) |

| 21 April 2001 | Laois | 0-13 - 1-16 | Tipperary | O'Moore Park, Portlaoise |
| | D Cuddy 0-4, C Cuddy 0-3, J Phelan 0-2, F O’Sullivan 0-2, D Conroy 0-1, C Coonan 0-1. | | D Ryan 1-3, E O’Neill 0-5, L Cahill 0-2, T Dunne, 0-2, N Morris 0-2, J O’Brien 0-2. |

| 28 April 2001 Semi-final | Galway | 1-15 - 2-19 | Tipperary | Cusack Park, Ennis |
| | M Kerins (1-3), E Cloonan (0- 5, four frees), L Burke (0-2, two frees), A Kerins (0-2), D Tierney (0-1); O Fahy (0-1), F Healy (0-1). | Report | M O'Leary (0-7, two frees), D Ryan (1-1), L Corbett (1-1), E Kelly (0-4, one free), E Enright (0-2), L Cahill (0-2), E O'Neill (0-1), J O'Brien (0-1). | Referee: P Ahern (Carlow) |

| 6 May 2001 Final | Tipperary | 1-19 - 0-17 | Clare | Gaelic Grounds, Limerick |
| | E Kelly 0-5 (2f), L Corbett 0-4, D Ryan 1-1, E Enright, M O'Leary 0-3 each, T Dunne 0-2 (2f), B O'Meara 0-1. | Report | J O'Connor 0-6 (3f), N Gilligan 0-3 (2f), O Baker, A Markham 0-2 each, D Forde, C Lynch, B Murphy, S McMahon (f) 0-1 each. | Attendance: 25,142; Referee: P O'Connor (Limerick) |

== 2001 Munster Senior Hurling Championship ==
3 June
Semi-Final

| Tipperary | 0-15 – 0-14 | Clare |
|---|---|---|
| E. Kelly (0-7), E. Enright (0-2), T. Dunne (0-2), B. O'Meara (0-1), L. Corbett (0-1), D. Ryan (0-1), P. Kelly (0-1). | (Report) | J. O'Connor (0-7), D. Forde (0-4), S. McMahon (0-3). |

Páirc Uí Chaoimh, Cork
Attendance: 42,063
Referee: D. Murphy (Wexford)
1 July
Final

| Tipperary | 2-16 – 1-17 | Limerick |
|---|---|---|
| D. Ryan (1-1), L. Corbett (1-1), M. O'Leary (0-3), B. O'Meara (0-2), E. Enright (0-2), T. Dunne (0-2), E. Kelly (0-2), P. Kelly (0-1), E. O'Neill (0-1), J. O'Brien (0-1). | (Report) | S. O'Connor (1-3), P. O'Grady (0-5), M. Foley (0-2), C. Carey (0-1), M. O'Brien (0-1), J. Foley (0-1), O. Moran (0-1), J. Butler (0-1), B. Begley (0-1), B. Foley (0-1). |

Páirc Uí Chaoimh, Cork
Attendance: 43,500
Referee: P. Horan (Offaly)

== 2001 All-Ireland Senior Hurling Championship ==
12 August
Semi-Final

| Wexford | 1-16 – 3-10 | Tipperary |
|---|---|---|
| L. O'Gorman (2-0), M. Jordan (0-4), P. Codd (0-4), R. McCarthy (1-0), A. Fenlon (0-2). | (report) | E. Kelly (0-5), J. Carroll (1-1), M. O'Leary (0-4), T. Dunne (0-2), E. Enright (0-1), B. O'Meara (0-1), M. Ryan (0-1), L. Corbett (0-1). |

Croke Park, Dublin
Attendance: 50,274
Referee: P. O'Connor (Limerick)
18 August
Semi-Final
Replay

| Tipperary | 3-12 – 0-10 | Wexford |
|---|---|---|
| E. Kelly (0-9), E. O'Neill (2-1), J. Carroll (1-0), M. O'Leary (0-2). | (report) | P. Codd (0-7), L. Murphy (0-1), M. Jordan (0-1), B. Goff (0-1). |

Croke Park, Dublin
Attendance: 39,125
Referee: P. Horan (Offaly)
9 September
Final

| Tipperary | 2-18 - 2-15 | Galway |
|---|---|---|
| M. O'Leary (2-1), E. Kelly (0-7), T. Dunne (0-5), L. Corbett (0-2), J. Carroll (0-1), D. Ryan (0-1), P. O'Brien (0-1). | (report) | E. Cloonan (1-5), F. Healy (1-2), K. Broderick (0-5), M. Kerins (0-2), J. Rabbitte (0-1). |

Croke Park, Dublin
Attendance: 68,515
Referee: P. O'Connor (Limerick)

| Tipperary | Galway |

== Awards ==
Tipperary went on to win seven All Star Awards with Brendan Cummins, Philip Maher, Éamonn Corcoran, Tommy Dunne, Eddie Enright, Mark O'Leary, and Eoin Kelly all winning awards. Tommy Dunne was also named as the Hurler of the year with Eoin Kelly winning the Young hurler of the year award.
