= Brian O'Meara (Mullinahone hurler) =

Irish hurler

Personal information
- Native name: Brian Ó Meára (Irish)
- Born: 5 June 1973 (age 53) Mullinahone, County Tipperary, Ireland
- Height: 6 ft 2 in (188 cm)

Sport
- Sport: Hurling
- Position: Left corner-forward
Club
- Years: Club
- Mullinahone
Club titles
- Tipperary titles: 1
Inter-county
- Years: County
- 1994-2004: Tipperary
Inter-county titles
- Munster titles: 1
- All-Irelands: 0
- NHL: 2
- All Stars: 0

Brian O'Meara (born 5 June 1973) is an Irish hurler who played as a left corner-forward for the Tipperary senior team.

O'Meara joined the team during the 1994 championship and was a regular member of the starting fifteen until his retirement a decade later. During that time he won one Munster winners' medal and two National Hurling League winners' medals. O'Meara was denied an All-Ireland winners' medal in 2001 having been ruled out of the final for receiving a red card in the semi-final.

At club level O'Meara is a one-time county club championship medalist plays with Mullinahone.

Sporting positions
Preceded by Tommy Dunne	Tipperary Senior Hurling Captain; 2003	Succeeded by Tommy Dunne
