= 1999 National Hurling League =

68th season of the National Hurling League

League details
- Dates: 21 February – 10 October 1999
- Teams: 33

League champions
- Winners: Tipperary (17th win)
- Captain: Tommy Dunne
- Manager: Nicky English

League runners-up
- Runners-up: Galway
- Captain: Cathal Moore
- Manager: Mattie Murphy

Other division winners
- Division 2: Derry
- Division 3: Armagh

The 1999 National Hurling League, known for sponsorship reasons as the Church & General National Hurling League, was the 68th edition of the National Hurling League (NHL), an annual hurling competition for the GAA county teams. Tipperary won the league, beating Galway by 1–14 to 1–10 in the final.

== Structure ==
There are 14 teams in Division 1, divided into 1A and 1B. Each team plays all the others once, either home or away. Teams earn one point for a draw and two for a win. The top teams in 1A and 1B play each other in the NHL final. The bottom teams in each group play each other in a relegation playoff.

There are 10 teams in Division 2. The top two play each other in the final, with the winner promoted. The bottom team is relegated.

There are 9 teams in Division 3. The top two play each other in the final, with the winner promoted.

== Division 1 ==
National Hurling League Division 1
- Season: 1999
- Champions: Tipperary; 17th National League title Captain: Tommy Dunne; Manager: Nicky English
- Relegated: Down
- Matches: 46
- Top goalscorer: Eugene Cloonan (7-49)
- All statistics correct as of 6 February 2017.

Cork came into the season as defending champions of the 1998 season. Kerry and Down entered Division 1 as the promoted teams.

On 2 May 1999, Tipperary won the title following a 1-14 - 1-10 win over Galway in the final. It was their first league title since 1993-94 and their 17th National League title overall.

Down, who lost all of their group stage matches, were relegated from Division 1 after losing the relegation play-off to Kerry by 2-13 to 0-12.

Galway's Eugene Cloonan was the Division 1 top scorer with 7-49.

=== Group 1A table ===
Pos	Team	Pld	W	D	L	Diff	Pts	Notes
1	Galway	6	6	0	0	74	12	Division 1 runners-up
2	Clare	6	4	1	1	17	9	
3	Offaly	6	3	0	3	12	6	
4	Antrim	6	3	0	3	-14	6	
5	Dublin	6	2	1	3	-14	5	
6	Limerick	6	2	0	4	2	4	
7	Kerry	6	0	0	6	-90	0	

=== Group stage ===
20 February 1999	Clare	5-15 - 1-6	Kerry	Cusack Park, Ennis
	A Markham 2-5, N Gilligan 1-4, F Hegarty 1-1, C Lynch 1-1, F Tuohy 0-3, B Minogue 0-1.		M Slattery 1-2, C Walsh 0-1, J Brick 0-1, T Cronin 0-1, R Gentleman 0-1.

21 February 1999	Limerick	1-19 - 0-6	Antrim	Gaelic Grounds, Limerick
	M Galligan 1-7, B Foley 0-4, J Moran 0-3, TJ Ryan 0-2, J Butler 0-1, S Tobin 0-1, O Moran 0-1.		A Elliot 0-2, S Kelly 0-2, S McMullan 0-1, Conor McCambridge 0-1.	Referee: P Dunphy (Kilkenny)

28 February 1999	Offaly	0-7 - 2-11	Galway	St. Brendan's Park, Birr
	J Troy 0-6, Brian Whelehan 0-1.		E Cloonan 1-6, O Canning 1-0, M Kerins 0-2, K Broderick 0-2, P Hardiman 0-1.	Referee: W Barrett (Tipperary)

7 March 1999	Galway	2-17 - 1-11	Clare	Ballinasloe
	E Cloonan 0-8, A Kerins 1-0, M Kerins 1-0, K Broderick 0-3, F Forde 0-2, C Moore 0-2, L Hodgins 0-1, N Kenny 0-1.		A Markham 1-3, A DAly 0-3, B Minogue 0-2, R O'Hara 0-1, N Gilligan 0-1, C Lynch 0-1.	Referee: D Murphy (Wexford)

7 March 1999	Antrim	1-14 - 2-10	Offaly	Loughguile
	A Elliott 1-10, J Close 0-2, J Flynn 0-1, S Kelly 0-1.		Brian Whelehan 1-3, M Duignan 1-2, J Troy 0-2, Johnny Dooley 0-2, N Murphy 0-1.	Referee: JA Gribben (Down)

14 March 1999	Kerry	2-9 - 2-14	Antrim	Austin Stack Park, Tralee
	M Slattery 0-5, B O'Sullivan 1-0, C Harty 1-0, Pádraig Cronin 0-1, C Walsh 0-1, JM Dooley 0-1, T O'Connell 0-1.		A Elliott 1-11, M Molloy 1-0, J Connolly 0-2, L Richmond 0-1.	Referee: J Sexton (Limerick)

20 March 1999	Clare	2-14 - 3-9	Antrim	Cusack Park, Ennis
	R O'Hara 1-3, A Markham 1-2, A Daly 0-3, F Tuohy 0-3, G Considine 0-1, N Gilligan 0-1, J Reddan 0-1.		A Elliott 1-7, M Dallas 1-0, S McMullan 1-0, C McGuckian 0-1, J Connolly 0-1.	Referee: G Harrington (Cork)

21 March 1999	Dublin	0-12 - 4-11	Galway	Parnell Park, Dublin
	T McGrane 0-6, K Flynn 0-4, N Butler 0-1, C McCann 0-1.		E Cloonan 3-5, K Broderick 0-4, M Kerins 1-0, F Healy 0-1, F Flynn 0-1.	Referee: T McIntyre (Antrim)

21 March 1999	Limerick	0-7 - 1-14	Offaly	Gaelic Grounds, Limerick
	S O'Neill 0-3, O Moran 0-2, M Galligan 0-1, M Holihan 0-1.		Johnny Dooley 0-8, J Troy 1-2, M Duignan 0-1, B Whelehan 0-1, P Mulhaire 0-1, C Cassidy 0-1.	Referee: J McDonnell (Tipperary)

27 March 1999	Dublin	1-13 - 2-15	Antrim	Parnell Park, Dublin
	T McGrane 0-10, L Ryan 1-0, B McLoughlin 0-1, C McCann 0-1, K Flynn 0-1.		A Elliott 1-8, J Carson 1-0, P McMullan 0-3, Greg O'Kane 0-2, S Kelly 0-2.	Referee: JA GRibben (Down)

27 March 1999	Galway	5-26 - 0-8	Kerry	Kenny Park, Athenry
	E Cloonan 1-9, K Broderick 1-2, F Healy 0-5, M Kerins 1-1, C Moore 0-4, A Kerins 1-0, P Hardiman 1-0, F Flynn 0-2, F Forde 0-2, N Shaughnessy 0-1.		M Slattery 0-3, C Walsh 0-2, T Maunsell 0-2, Pádraig Cronin 0-1.	Referee: S McMahon (Clare)

28 March 1999	Limerick	1-10 - 0-14	Clare	Gaelic Grounds, Limerick
	M Houlihan 1-1, M Galligan 0-4, S O'Neill 0-2, TJ Ryan 0-1, O Moran 0-1.		J O'Connor 0-4, C Lynch 0-3, N Gilligan 0-2, S McMahon 0-2, A Daly 0-1, A Markham 0-1, D Forde 0-1.	Referee: P Aherne (Carlow)

4 April 1999	Clare	2-5 - 1-6	Offaly	Cusack Park, Ennis
	D Forde 1-3, O Baker 1-0, B Murphy 0-1, S McMahon 0-1.		Johnny Dooley 0-4, J Pillington 1-0, M Fuignan 0-1, J Troy 0-1.	Referee: P O'Connor (Limerick)

4 April 1999	Dublin	2-12 - 0-11	Limerick	Parnell Park, Dublin
	S Ryan 1-2, T McGrane 0-5, C McCann 1-1, K Flynn 0-2, D Sweeney 0-1, L Ryan 0-1.		M Galligan 0-5, J Moran 0-3, S O'Neill 0-1, C Smith 0-1, M Houlihan 0-1.	Referee: P Aherne (Carlow)

10 April 1999	Offaly	1-11 - 0-9	Dublin	St. Brendan's Park, Birr
	J Pilkington 0-4, Johnny Dooley 0-4, Brian Whelehan 1-0, M Duignan 0-1, B Dooley 0-1, C Farrell 0-1.		T McGrane 0-5, C McCann 0-2, K Flynn 0-1, D Sweeney 0-1.	Referee: P Aherne (Carlow)

11 April 1999	Limerick	2-15 - 0-12	Kerry	Gaelic Grounds, Limerick
	M Houlihan 0-6, D Quigley 1-2, C Hickey 1-0, O Moran 0-3, J Foley 0-2, M Fitzgerald 0-2.		M Slattery 0-5, C Walsh 0-3, T Maunsell 0-1, I Maunsell 0-1, M O'Regan 0-1, T O'Connell 0-1.	Referee: G Hartigan (Cork)

11 April 1999	Antrim	0-9 - 1-13	Galway	Loughguile
	Greg O'Kane 0-2, S Kelly 0-1, J Close 0-1, A Delargy 0-1, A Elliott 0-1, J Carson 0-1, P McMullan 0-1, S McMullan 0-1.		E Cloonan 0-7, M Kerins 1-2, A Kerins 0-2, N Shaughnessy 0-1, C Moore 0-1.	Referee: É Morris (Dublin)

18 April 1999	Dublin	1-13 - 1-13	Clare	Parnell Park, Dublin
	T McGrane 0-5, L Ryan 1-1, C McCann 0-2, E Carroll 0-2, D Sweeney 0-2, S Martin 0-1.		B Minogue 0-4, PJ O'Connell 1-0, S McNamara 0-2, D Scanlan 0-2, F Hegarty 0-2, L Hassett 0-2, R Woods 0-1.	Referee: D Murphy (Wexford)

18 April 1999	Galway	2-14 - 1-12	Limerick	Kenny Park, Athenry
	E Cloonan 0-8, A Kerins 1-1, K Broderick 1-1, O Fahy 0-3, C Moore 0-1.		M Galligan 0-6, TJ Ryan 1-0, B Tobin 0-1, J Foley 0-1, M Houlihan 0-1, M Foley 0-1, J Moran 0-1, B Foley 0-1.	Referee: S McMahon (Clare)

18 April 1999	Kerry	1-7 - 0-20	Offaly	Austin Stack Park, Tralee
	JJ Canty 1-0, M Slattery 0-3, C Walsh 0-2, B O'Sullivan 0-1, T Maunsell 0-1.		E Martin 0-6, J Errity 0-5, P Mulhaire 0-3, C Cassidy 0-3, D Regan 0-2, G Hanniffy 0-1.	Referee: W Horgan (Cork)

24 April 1999	Kerry	0-11 - 4-12	Dublin	Austin Stack Park, Tralee
	M Slattery 0-8, B O'Sullivan 0-2, JJ Canty 0-1.		T McGrane 1-7, E Carroll 2-1, C Featherstone 1-0, D Sweeney 0-2, S Martin 0-1, L Ryan 0-1.	Referee: S Roche (Tipperary)

=== Group 1B table ===
Pos	Team	Pld	W	D	L	Diff	Pts	Notes
1	Tipperary	6	5	0	1	44	10	Division 1 champions
2	Kilkenny	6	5	0	1	30	10	
3	Cork	6	4	0	2	31	8	
4	Laois	6	3	0	3	-16	6	
5	Waterford	6	2	0	4	21	4	
6	Wexford	6	2	0	4	3	4	
7	Down	6	0	0	6	-113	0	Relegation to Division 2

=== Group stage ===
21 February 1999	Laois	2-10 - 1-9	Wexford	Rathdowney
	P Peacock 1-0, L Tynan 1-0, N Rigney 0-3, D Cuddy 0-3, D Rooney 0-2, M Rooney 0-1, P Cuddy 0-1.		T Dempsey 0-5, L O'Gorman 1-0, A Fenlon 0-1, S Colfer 0-1, E Scallan 0-1, M Storey 0-1.	Referee: G Devlin (Armagh)

21 February 1999	Waterford	5-14 - 0-4	Down	Fraher Field, Dungarvan
	P Flynn 3-1, D Bennett 0-7, D Shanahan 1-0, Seán Daly 1-0, K McGrath 0-2, T Browne 0-1, P Queally 0-1, M Molumphy 0-1, A Lennon 0-1.		J McCrickard 0-2, E Trainor 0-1, G McGrattan 0-1.	Referee: L Kelly (Westmeath)

21 February 1999	Cork	0-14 - 1-9	Kilkenny	Páirc Uí Rinn, Cork
	J Deane 0-4, S McGrath 0-3, T McCarthy 0-2, F McCormack 0-1, M Landers 0-1, D Barrett 0-1, P Ryan 0-1, K Morrison 0-1.		H Shefflin 1-4, C Carter 0-4, DJ Carey 0-1.	Referee: A Mac Suibhne (Dublin)

7 March 1999	Wexford	1-14 - 0-11	Waterford	O'Kennedy Park, New Ross
	T Dempsey 1-8, A Fenlon 0-2, M Jordan 0-1, G Buggy 0-1, R Quigley 0-1, L Murphy 0-1.		D Bennett 0-7, P Flynn 0-1, A Kirwin 0-1, T Browne 0-1, K McGrath 0-1.	Referee: L Flynn (Cork)

7 March 1999	Kilkenny	2-15 - 0-16	Laois	Nowlan Park, Kilkenny
	H Shefflin 0-8, DJ Carey 1-1, B McEvoy 1-0, C Carter 0-3, M Kavanagh 0-1, A Comerford 0-1, K O'Shea 0-1.		D Cuddy 0-6, N Rigney 0-4, D Rooney 0-2, D Conroy 0-2, J Young 0-1, M Rooney 0-1.	Referee: W Barrett (Tipperary)

7 March 1999	Down	0-8 - 4-23	Tipperary	McKenna Park, Ballycran
	J McCrickard 0-3, J McCarthy 0-2, N Sands 0-1, S Murray 0-1, M Branniff 0-1.		T Dunne 1-8, P Ormond 1-2, L Cahill 1-1, J Enright 0-4, E Tucker 1-0, W Maher 0-3, B O'Meara 0-2, D Browne 0-2, J Leahy 0-1.	Referee: É Morris (Dublin)

21 March 1999	Waterford	1-12 - 1-16	Kilkenny	Walsh Park, Waterford
	M White 1-4, D Bennett 0-6, T Browne 0-1, B Browne 0-1.		H Shefflin 0-6, K O'Shea 1-2, C carter 0-4, D Maher 0-1, N Moloney 0-1, DJ Carey 0-1, S Grehan 0-1.	Referee: P Horan (Offaly)

21 March 1999	Tipperary	1-16 - 1-8	Wexford	Semple Stadium, Thurles
	T Dunne 0-9, D Browne 1-1, L Cahill 0-2, E Tucker 0-1, E Enright 0-1, J Leahy 0-1, P Ormonde 0-1.		P Codd 1-6, R McCarthy 0-1, A Fenlon 0-1.	Referee: S McMahon (Clare)

21 March 1999	Laois	1-13 - 0-12	Cork	Rathdowney
	D Cuddy 1-3, N Rigney 0-3, D Rooney 0-2, C Cuddy 0-2, E Fennelly 0-1, M Rooney 0-1, D Conroy 0-1.		J Deane 0-7, K Morrison 0-3, P Ryan 0-1, B Coleman 0-1.	Referee: B Kelly (Westmeath)

27 March 1999	Cork	3-9 - 1-12	Waterford	Cork
	J Deane 1-5, A Browne 1-1, F McCormack 1-1, K Morrison 0-1, T McCarthy 0-1.	Crotta and Abbeydorney hurling notes	D Bennett 0-6, S Frampton 1-0, M White 0-2, S Daly 0-2, A Kirwin 0-1, K McGrath 0-1.	Stadium: Páirc Uí Rinn, Cork; Attendance: 6000; Referee: A Mac Suibhne (Dublin) and Linesmen Kevin Leen and Ger Neenan (Kerry).

28 March 1999	Kilkenny	3-14 - 1-13	Tipperary	Nowlan Park, Kilkenny
	N Moloney 1-3, H Shefflin 0-6, B McEvoy 1-1, K O'Shea 1-1, DJ Carey 0-2, A Comerford 0-1.		T Dunne 0-5, P Shelly 1-1, L Cahill 0-3, E Tucker 0-2, W Maher 0-1, E O'Neill 0-1.	Referee: P O'Connor (Limerick)

28 March 1999	Wexford	2-18 - 0-7	Down	Enniscorthy
	P Codd 0-7, M Storey 1-3, C McGrath 1-1, T Dempsey 0-2, R McCarthy 0-2, D Ruth 0-1, R Quigley 0-1, G Laffan 0-1.		D McCrickard 0-2, G McGrattan 0-2, G Savage 0-1, O McGrattan 0-1, B Coulter 0-1.	Referee: P Moore (Waterford)

4 April 1999	Waterford	2-12 - 0-6	Laois	Walsh Park, Waterford
	P Flynn 2-5, M White 0-3, A Kirwin 0-1, K McGrath 0-1, D Bennett 0-1, B O'Sullivan 0-1.		D Cuddy 0-2, C Cuddy 0-1, D Rooney 0-1, E Fennelly 0-1, N Rigney 0-1.	Referee: W Barrett (Tipperary)

4 April 1999	Tipperary	1-12 - 1-11	Cork	Semple Stadium, Thurles
	L Cahill 1-2, T Dunne 0-5, D Ryan 0-2, E Enright 0-1, J Leahy 0-1, G Maguire 0-1.		J Deane 1-6, S McGrath 0-3, S O'Farrell 0-1, D O'Sullivan 0-1.	Referee: D Murphy (Wexford)

4 April 1999	Kilkenny	2-20 - 0-14	Down	McKenna Park, Ballycran
	N Moloney 2-3, H Shefflin 0-7, DJ Carey 0-5, B McEvoy 0-2, C Carter 0-2, S Grehan 0-1.		J McCrickard 0-8, J McCarthy 0-2, M Coulter 0-2, M Branniff 0-1, E Trainor 0-1.	Referee: T McIntyre (Antrim)

10 April 1999	Laois	1-9 - 2-16	Tipperary	O'Moore Park, Portlaoise
	M Rooney 1-0, N Rigney 0-3, D Cuddy 0-2, Declan Rooney 0-2, E Fennelly 0-2.		T Dunne 0-7, P Shelley 1-1, G Maguire 0-4, B O'Meara 1-0, J Leahy 0-2, D Browne 0-1, D Carr 0-1.	Referee: G Devlin (Armagh)

10 April 1999	Cork	5-19 - 0-7	Down	Páirc Uí Rinn, Cork
	J Deane 1-6, K Murray 2-0, F McCormack 1-3, S O'Farrell 1-2, B o'Connor 0-3, P Ryan 0-2, T McCarthy 0-1, D Murphy 0-1, S McGrath 0-1.		J McCrickard 0-3, M Coulter 0-1, M Branniff 0-1, E Trainor 0-1, G Gordon 0-1.	Referee: P Moore (Waterford)

11 April 1999	Kilkenny	3-12 - 3-8	Wexford	Nowlan Park, Kilkenny
	H Shefflin 1-3, C Carter 1-2, DJ Carey 1-1, D Byrne 0-2, B McEvoy 0-1, J Power 0-1, S Grehan 0-1, P Barry 0-1.		M Storey 1-3, G Laffan 1-0, C McGrath 1-0, P Codd 0-3, L Murphy 0-1, R McCarthy 0-1.	Referee: J McDonnell (Tipperary)

17 April 1999	Down	1-9 - 0-17	Laois	Fontenoy Park, Leitrim
	M Coulter 1-2, J McCrickard 0-4, P Coulter 0-2, E Trainor 0-1.		D Cuddy 0-5, N Rigney 0-3, C Cuddy 0-3, D Rooney 0-2, E Fennelly 0-2, L Tynan 0-1, D Conroy 0-1.	Referee: G Devlin (Armagh)

18 April 1999	Wexford	1-14 - 1-18	Cork	Páirc Uí Shíocháin, Gorey
	P Codd 0-8, T Dempsey 1-0, G Laffan 0-2, L Murphy 0-2, R Quigley 0-1, L Dunne 0-1.		J Deane 0-10, B o'Connor 1-0, S McGrath 0-2, B Corcoran 0-1, D Murphy 0-1, P Ryan 0-1, M Landers 0-1, A Browne 0-1, B Coleman 0-1.	Referee: A Mac Suibhne (Dublin)

18 April 1999	Tipperary	1-14 - 0-14	Waterford	Semple Stadium, Thurles
	D Browne 1-1, T Dunne 0-4, L Cahill 0-4, G Maguire 0-2, D Carr 0-1, A Ryan 0-1, P Shelley 0-1.		P Flynn 0-4, K McGrath 0-2, M White 0-2, A Lannon 0-1, D Bennett 0-1, D Shanahan 0-1, B O'Sullivan 0-1, P Queally 0-1, F Hartley 0-1.	Referee: T McIntyre (Antrim)

=== Relegation play-off ===
16 May 1999 Relegation play-off	Kerry	2-13 - 0-12	Down	O'Moore Park, Portlaoise
	T Maunsell 1-2, M Slattery 0-4, J J Canty 0-3, T O'Connor 1-0, C Walsh, B O'Sullivan 0-2 each.	Report	E Trainor 0-4, J McCrickard 0-3, G Gordon 0-2, P Coulter, P McCabe, M Braniff 0-1 each.

=== Knock-out stage ===
Semi-finals

2 May 1999 Semi-final	Galway	2-15 - 1-15	Kilkenny	Gaelic Grounds, Limerick
	E Cloonan 1-3, A Kerins 1-0, L Burke 0-3, T Cavanagh 0-2, C Moore 0-2, O Fahy 0-2, M Kerins 0-2, N Shaughnessy 0-1.		H Shefflin 0-8, C Carter 1-4, B McEvoy 0-2, PJ Delaney 0-1.	Referee: P O'Connor (Limerick)

2 May 1999 Semi-final	Tipperary	0-19 - 1-15	Clare	Gaelic Grounds, Limerick
	T Dunne 0-12, B O'Meara 0-3, D Ryan 0-2, D Carr 0-1, L Cahill 0-1.		J O'Connor 0-7, R O'Hara 1-1, N Gilligan 0-3, A Markham 0-2, C Lynch 0-1, S McMahon 0-1.	Referee: D Murphy (Wexford)

Final

16 May 1999 Final	Tipperary	1-14 - 1-10	Galway	Cusack Park, Ennis
	T Dunne 0-9, J Leahy 1-1, D Carr 0-2, L Cahill 0-1, D Ryan 0-1.		E Cloonan 1-3, A Kerins 0-4, K Broderick 0-3.	Attendance: 13,500; Referee: D Murphy (Wexford)

=== Scoring statistics ===
Top scorers overall

Rank	Player	Team	Tally	Total	Matches	Average
1	Eugene Cloonan	Galway	7-49	70	8	8.75
2	Tommy Dunne	Tipperary	1-59	62	8	7.75
3	Alastair Elliott	Antrim	4-39	51	6	8.50
4	Henry Shefflin	Kilkenny	2-42	48	7	6.85
5	Joe Deane	Cork	3-38	47	6	7.83

Top scorers in a single game

Rank	Player	Team	Tally	Total	Opposition
1	Eugene Cloonan	Galway	3-05	14	Dublin
1	Alistair Elliott	Antrim	1-11	14	Kerry
3	Alistair Elliott	Antrim	1-10	13	Offaly
4	Eugene Cloonan	Galway	1-09	12	Kerry
4	Tommy Dunne	Tipperary	0-12	12	Clare
6	Alan Markham	Clare	2-05	11	Kerry
6	Paul Flynn	Waterford	2-05	11	Laois
6	Alistair Elliott	Antrim	1-08	11	Dublin
6	Tom Dempsey	Wexford	1-08	11	Waterford
6	Tommy Dunne	Tipperary	1-08	11	Down

== Division 2 ==
=== Division 2 table ===
Pos	Team	Pld	W	D	L	Diff	Pts	Notes
1	Derry	9	8	0	1	76	16	Division 2 champions
2	Wicklow	9	7	0	2	83	14	Division 2 runners-up
3	Roscommon	9	6	1	2	43	13	
4	Kildare	9	5	0	4	11	10	
5	Carlow	9	4	1	4	-6	9	
6	Westmeath	9	4	0	5	13	8	
7	Meath	9	3	1	5	-20	7	
8	Tyrone	9	3	1	5	-20	7	
9	London	9	3	1	5	-21	7	
10	Monaghan	9	0	0	9	-113	0	Relegated to Division 3

=== Knock-out stage ===
30 May 1999 Final	Derry	1-14 - 0-13	Wicklow	O'Moore Park, Portlaoise

== Division 3 ==
=== Knock-out stage ===
10 October 1999 Final	Armagh	0-13 - 1-6	Mayo	Ballymahon
