= 1992 Tipperary county hurling team season =

Tipperary county hurling team
1992 season
Manager	Babs Keating
All-Ireland SHC	Did not qualify
Munster SHC	Semi-final
National League	Finalists
- Top scorer
- Highest SHC attendance
- Lowest SHC attendance
Standard colours

In 1992 Tipperary competed in the National Hurling League and the Munster Championship. It was Babs Keating's sixth year in charge of the team with Colm Bonnar named as team captain. The team were sponsored by National Irish Bank which appeared on the jerseys. In the Munster championship, Tipperary lost in the semi-final to Cork by three points and exited the championship after one match.

== National Hurling League ==
=== Division 1A table ===
Pos	Team	Pld	W	D	L	Pts	Notes
1	Limerick	5	4	1	0	9	National League champions
2	Tipperary	5	3	1	1	7	National League runners-up
3	Kilkenny	5	3	0	2	6	
4	Down	5	2	0	3	4	
5	Offaly	5	1	1	3	3	
6	Laois	5	0	1	4	1	Relegated to Division 2

20 October 1991	Limerick	2-12 - 0-13	Tipperary	Gaelic Grounds, Limerick
	G Kirby 1-6, S Fitzgibbon 1-1, M Galligan 0-3, P Davoren 0-2.		C Stakelum 0-7, P Fox 0-2, D Ryan 0-1, D O'Connell 0-1, A Ryan 0-1, J O'Dwyer 0-1.	Referee: P Horan (Offaly)

3 November 1991	Tipperary	2-18 - 1-11	Kilkenny	Semple Stadium, Thurles
	C Stakelum 0-7, P Fox 1-3, A Ryan 1-2, D O'Connell 0-3, D Ryan 0-3.		L McCarthy 0-4, L Fennelly 1-0, A Ronan 0-2, C Carter 0-2, P Phelan 0-1, P Ryan 0-1, M Phelan 0-1.	Referee: T Murray (Limerick)

16 February 1992	Offaly	1-7 - 2-17	Tipperary	St. Brendan's Park, Birr
	Johnny Dooley 0-4, M Duignan 1-0, Joe Dooley 0-1, B Dooley 0-1, B Kelly 0-1.		D Ryan 1-3, M Cleary 0-6, C Stakelum 0-5, N English 1-1, J Leahy 0-2.	Referee: J Moore (Waterford)

1 March 1992	Tipperary	5-24 - 2-6	Down	Semple Stadium, Thurles
	N English 2-4, D Ryan 2-2, J Leahy 1-5, M Cleary 0-6, C Stakelum 0-3, B Ryan 0-2, J Hayes 0-1, D Carr 0-1.		C Mageean 0-4, B Coulter 1-0, N Sands 1-0, P McCrickard 0-1, D Hughes 0-1.

22 March 1992	Laois	2-10 - 2-10	Tipperary	Kelly Daly Park, Rathdowney
	PJ Cuddy 1-0, J Bates 1-0, P Bergin 0-4, D Conroy 0-3, D Rooney 0-1, N Delaney 0-1, C Dunphy 0-1.		J Leahy 2-1, M CLeary 0-5, C Stakelum 0-2, P Fox 0-1, A Ryan 0-1.	Referee: S McMahon (Clare)

19 April 1992 Semi-final	Tipperary	1-15 - 1-8	Galway	Cusack Park, Ennis
	M Cleary 1-7, P Fox 0-4, A Ryan 0-2, C Stakelum 0-1, J Hayes 0-1.		E Burke 0-4, J Rabbitte 1-0, J Cooney 0-3, M McGrath 0-1.	Attendance: 20,000; Referee: P Delaney (Laois)

10 May 1992 Final	Limerick	0-14 - 0-13	Tipperary	Gaelic Grounds, Limerick
	G Kirby 0-4, C Carey 0-2, G Hegarty 0-2, M Houlihan 0-1, M Reale 0-1, J O'Connor 0-1, R Sampson 0-1, S Fitzgibbon 0-1, L Garvey 0-1.		M Cleary 0-4, C Stakelum 0-3, P Fox 0-3, N English 0-2, D Carr 0-1.	Attendance: 30,236; Referee: D Murphy (Wexford)

== 1992 Munster Senior Hurling Championship ==
7 June
Semi-Final

Cork	2-12 – 1-12	Tipperary
T. O'Sullivan (0-7), J. Fitzgibbon (1-1), T. Mulcahy (1-0), B. Corcoran (0-2), G. FitzGerald (0-1), K. Hennessy (0-1).		D. Ryan (1-1), M. Cleary (0-3), C. Stakelum (0-3), P. Fox (0-2), A. Ryan (0-2), D. Carr (0-1).

Páirc Uí Chaoimh, Cork
Attendance: 42,416
Referee: K. Walsh (Clare)

== Awards ==
Tipperary won one All Star Award with forward Michael Cleary picking up his third award.
