= Tommy Dunne (hurler, born 1974) =

Irish hurler and coach (born 1974)

Personal information
- Native name: Tomás Ó Doinn (Irish)
- Nickname: Tommy
- Born: 21 May 1974 (age 52) Nenagh, County Tipperary, Ireland
- Height: 6 ft 0 in (183 cm)

Sport
- Sport: Hurling
- Position: Midfield
Club
- Years: Club
- 1991–2007: Toomevara
Club titles
- Tipperary titles: 10
- Munster titles: 3
- All-Ireland Titles: 0
Inter-county*
Years	County	Apps (scores)
1993–2005	Tipperary	44 (6–106)
Inter-county titles
- Munster titles: 2
- All-Irelands: 1
- NHL: 3
- All Stars: 3
- *Inter County team apps and scores correct as of 18:17, 17 August 2009 (UTC).

Tomás Dunne (born 21 May 1974) is an Irish hurling coach and former player who is from Toomevara, County Tipperary in Ireland. He is the current coach of the Tipperary senior hurling team.

Dunne enjoyed a distinguished playing career with Toomevara GAA club and at inter-county level with Tipperary. He was a midfielder on the latter team from 1993 until 2005 and collected one All-Ireland title as captain, two Munster titles, three National Hurling League titles and three All-Star awards.

Immediately after retiring from inter-county and club activity, Dunne became involved in team management. He was a selector on the Tipperary minor team that captured the All-Ireland title in that grade in 2007. Dunne later served as coach, under the management of Ken Hogan, to the Tipperary under-21 team that captured the All-Ireland title in 2010.

== Playing career ==
=== Club ===
Dunne played his club hurling with his local club in Toomevara and enjoyed much success. His playing days coincided with a great upturn in fortunes for the club. Dunne first tasted victory in 1992 when 'Toome' defeated the mighty Thurles Sarsfields after a replay to take their first senior county title since 1960.

1993 also brought success for Dunne as he collected a second county championship title following a one-point win over Nenagh Éire Óg. Toomevara later represented Tipp in the provincial club championship with Dunne playing a key role in the club's 0–15 to 0–7 defeat of Sixmilebridge in the provincial decider. It was his first Munster club title. Toomevara later reached the All-Ireland club final with Sarsfield's of Galway providing the opposition. Toomevara scored key goals in the 13th, 29th and 44th minutes to take a three-point lead coming into the final stage of the game. Sarsfield's fought back to win by 1–14 to 3–6.

Dunne captured a third county title in-a-row in 1994 following a defeat of Cashel King Cormac's, however, Toomevara later surrendered their Munster club title to Kilmallock.

After a brief hiatus more success followed for Dunne when he won four county titles in-a-row between 1998 and 2001. A fifth consecutive county championship triumph proved beyond Toomevara's reach, however, Dunne won further back-to-back county titles in 2003 and 2004. This latter victory was later converted into a second Munster club title following a narrow 1–14 to 1–13 victory over Mount Sion of Waterford. Toomevara later fell to Athenry in the All-Ireland semi-final.

In 2006 Dunne won his tenth and final county championship winners' medal with Toomevara, this time as captain of the side. He subsequently captured his third Munster club title, however, his side lost in the All-Ireland club semi-final with Dunne being controversially sent off after a straightforward punch to the guts. This event became the spark which Ballyhale Shamrocks needed to ignite their passions and, coupled with the inability of the selectors to see what was happening in front of them, brought about Toomevara's downfall. Following this defeat Dunne decided to retire from club hurling.

=== Minor and under-21 ===
Dunne first came to prominence on the inter-county scene in the early 1990s as a member of the Tipperary minor hurling team. He won a Munster title in this grade in 1991 following a 3–13 to 1–5 demolition of Limerick. Dunne later lined out in the All-Ireland final with Kilkenny providing the opposition. 'The Cats' were superior on that occasion and won the game by 0–15 to 1–10.

Dunne subsequently joined the Tipperary under-21 hurling team and enjoyed more success. He won a Munster title in this grade in 1995 after a 1–17 to 0–14 defeat of Clare. Once again, Dunne later lined out in the All-Ireland final and, once again, Kilkenny were the opponents. An exciting game developed with Dunne playing a key role in the 1–14 to 1–10 victory for Tipp. Not only did Dunne collect an All-Ireland under-21 medal but his performance in that game earned him the RTÉ Man of the Match award.

=== Senior ===
By this stage Dunne had already joined the Tipperary senior hurling team. He made his senior championship debut in a Munster semi-final victory over Kerry in 1993. Tipp later captured the Munster title, however, Dunne found it difficult to break onto the team.

At the start of 1994 Dunne enjoyed his first success at senior level when he came on as a substitute in Tipp's National Hurling League victory over Galway. Tipperary, however, enjoyed little success in the championship.

After defeat after a draw and a replay in the Munster final of 1996, Dunne lined out in a second consecutive provincial decider in 1997. Clare provided the opposition on that occasion, however, it was an occasion to forget for Dunne as Tipp lost a close and exciting game by 1–18 to 0–18. The introduction of the new 'back-door' system resulted in both Clare and Tipperary meeting for the second time in the first all-Munster All-Ireland final. The game itself was one of the best of the decade. Clare were well on top for much of the game, however, Liam Cahill and Eugene O'Neill scored twice for Tipp in the last ten minutes. John Leahy missed a goal chance in the last minute while another Tipp point was controversially ruled wide. At the full-time whistle Clare won by a single point – 0–20 to 2–13. In spite of this defeat Dunne was later presented with his first All-Star award.

Dunne added a second National League medal to his collection in 1999; however, success in the championship still eluded him. In spite of this Dunne picked up a second All-Star award in 1999; however, Tipp went on to lose an exciting Munster final to Cork in 2000.

In 2001 Dunne was captain of the Tipperary team for a third consecutive year. That year Tipp made a third consecutive appearance in the National League final. After one victory and one defeat Dunne's side were successful again and defeated Clare by 1–19 to 0–17. It was Dunne's third winners' medal in that competition. Later that year Tipp contested the Munster final. It was Dunne's fourth time lining out in a provincial decider, however, he had yet to end up on the winning side. All this changed in 2001 when Tipperary defeated Limerick by 2–16 to 1–17. It was Dunne's first Munster title. After a draw and a replay against Wexford Dunne later led his team out in Croke Park on All-Ireland final day. Galway provided the opposition on that occasion; however, two goals by Tipp's Mark O'Leary gave the Munster men the threshold to withstand a Galway comeback. With nine minutes to go Dunne's side only led by one point, however, Tipperary outscored Galway by five to three in those closing minutes. At the final whistle Tipperary were the winners by 2–18 to 2–15. Not only did Dunne collect his first, and only, All-Ireland medal but he also had the honour of collecting the Liam MacCarthy Cup on behalf of his team and county. A third All-Star award quickly followed while Dunne also picked up all three Hurler of the Year awards.

The subsequent few years proved frustrating for Dunne as Tipperary failed to win any further Munster or All-Ireland titles. He retired from inter-county hurling in 2005.

=== Provincial ===
Dunne also lined out with Munster in the Railway Cup inter-provincial competition. He first played for his province in 1996 and won his first Railway Cup title that year as Munster defeated Leinster in the final. Dunne won one further inter-provincial title in 1997 but continued to line out with his province until 2002.

== Coaching career ==
On 11 September 2010, Tipperary Under-21 hurlers, coached by Dunne, clinched the All Ireland Under-21 title by defeating Galway by 5–22 to 0–12 at Semple Stadium. In November 2010, he was appointed as coach of the Tipperary Senior hurling team as part of new manager Declan Ryan's management team. Also, Dunne holds qualifications in Strength & Conditioning coaching from online sports college Setanta College.

In September 2017, Dunne was announced as the manager of the Tipperary U-17 hurling team for 2018.

In October 2018, Dunnes was named by new Tipperary manager Liam Sheedy as a coach of the Tipperary senior hurling team for 2019.

In 2022, he was a selector under new Tipperary manager Colm Bonnar before departing in July 2022.

== Honours ==
Toomevara

- Munster Senior Club Hurling Championship (3): 1993, 2004, 2006
- Tipperary Senior Hurling Championship (10): 1992, 1993, 1994, 1998, 1999, 2000, 2001, 2003, 2004, 2006
- North Tipperary Senior Hurling Championship (10): 1991, 1994, 1995, 1997, 1999, 2000, 2001, 2003, 2004, 2006

Tipperary

- All-Ireland Senior Hurling Championship (1): 2001
- Munster Senior Hurling Championship (2): 1993 (sub), 2001
- National Hurling League (3): 1993–94, 1999, 2001
- All-Ireland Under-21 Hurling Championship (1): 1995
- Munster Under-21 Hurling Championship (1): 1995
- Munster Minor Hurling Championship (1): 1991

Munster

- Railway Cup (2): 1996, 1997

Individual

- All Stars Hurler of the Year (1): 2001
- Texaco Hurler of the Year (1): 2001
- GPA Hurler of the Year (1): 2001
- All Stars (3): 1997, 1999, 2001
- All-Ireland Hurling Final Man of the Match (1): 2001
- In May 2020, a public poll conducted by RTÉ.ie named Dunne at midfield alongside Michael Fennelly in a team of hurlers who had won All Stars during the era of The Sunday Game.

Sporting positions
Preceded by Declan Ryan	Tipperary Senior Hurling Captain; 1999–2002	Succeeded by Brian O'Meara
Preceded by Brian O'Meara	Tipperary Senior Hurling Captain; 2004	Succeeded by Benny Dunne
Achievements
Preceded by Willie O'Connor (Kilkenny)	All-Ireland Senior Hurling winning captain 2001	Succeeded by Andy Comerford (Kilkenny)
Awards
Preceded by D.J. Carey (Kilkenny)	Vodafone Hurler of the Year; 2001	Succeeded by Henry Shefflin (Kilkenny)
Preceded by D.J. Carey (Kilkenny)	Texaco Hurler of the Year; 2001	Succeeded by Henry Shefflin (Kilkenny)
Preceded by D.J. Carey (Kilkenny)	Gaelic Players' Association; Hurler of the Year; 2001	Succeeded by Henry Shefflin (Kilkenny)
