= Nicky English =

Irish hurler

Personal information
- Native name: Nioclás Inglis (Irish)
- Nickname: Nicky
- Born: 20 October 1962 (age 64) Cullen, County Tipperary, Ireland
- Occupation: Barclays Private Bank
- Height: 6 ft 0 in (183 cm)

Sport
- Sport: Hurling
- Position: Full-forward
Club
- Years: Club
- Lattin–Cullen
Club titles
- Tipperary titles: 0
College
- Years: College
- 1980–1985: University College Cork
College titles
- Fitzgibbon titles: 5
Inter-county*
Years	County	Apps (scores)
1982–1996	Tipperary	35 (20–117)
Inter-county titles
- Munster titles: 5
- All-Irelands: 2
- NHL: 2
- All Stars: 6
- *Inter County team apps and scores correct as of 15:52, 14 December 2013.

Nicholas J. "Nicky" English (born 20 October 1962) is an Irish former hurler who played as a full-forward at senior level for the Tipperary county team.

Born in Cullen, County Tipperary, English first played competitive Gaelic games during his schooling at the Abbey CBS. He arrived on the inter-county scene at the age of seventeen when he first linked up with the Tipperary minor teams as a dual player, before later joining the under-21 sides. He made his senior debut during the 1982 championship. English went on to play a key part for almost fifteen years, and won two All-Ireland medals, five Munster medals and two National Hurling League medals. He was an All-Ireland runner-up on one occasion.

As a member of the Munster inter-provincial team at various times throughout his career, English won two Railway Cup medals. At club level he won a set of intermediate and junior championship medals with Lattin-Cullen. English also won a remarkable five successive Fitzgibbon Cup medals with University College Cork.

English's career tally of 20 goals and 117 points marks him out as Tipperary's third highest championship scorer of all-time.

Throughout his career English made 35 championship appearances. He announced his retirement from inter-county hurling following the conclusion of the 1996 championship.

In retirement from playing English has become involved in team management and coaching. As manager of the Tipperary senior team between 1998 and 2002 he steered the team to All-Ireland, Munster and National League honours. He has also taken charge of the University College Dublin team for the Fitzgibbon Cup.

As a hurling analyst in the media English writes a weekly column in The Irish Times, while he has also worked as a co-commentator with TV3 and RTÉ Radio 1 during their championship coverage. In May 2014 it was announced that English would be an analyst and co-commentator for Sky Sports new Gaelic games coverage.

English is widely regarded as one of Tipperary's greatest ever players. During his playing days he won six All-Star awards as well as the Texaco Hurler of the Year award in 1989. He has been repeatedly voted onto teams made up of the sport's greats, including at left corner-forward and right corner-forward on the respective Tipperary and Fitzgibbon Cup Hurling Teams of the Century. In 2009 he was chosen on a special Munster team of the quarter century, while he was also included as one of the 125 greatest hurlers of all-time.

== Personal life ==
English was born in the village of Cullen, County Tipperary in 1962. He attended Galbally national school, before later completing his secondary schooling at The Abbey School in Tipperary town.

After beginning a degree in electrical engineering in 1980, English switched courses and started a Bachelor of Arts in 1981 before later completing his higher diploma in education.

In 1989 English began working for Allied Irish Bank, while in 2011 he began working with Barclays Wealth.

In 1996 he published his autobiography Beyond The Tunnel. The book was ghost written by Vincent Hogan of the Irish Independent.

== Playing career ==
=== University ===
During his studies at University College Cork English played competitive hurling, and in 1981 was a forward as UCC faced University College Dublin in the final of the inter-varsities championship. A 2–9 to 0–8 victory gave English his first Fitzgibbon Cup medal.

In 1982 University College Cork hosted the championship and reached the final once again. A narrow 0–14 to 3–3 defeat of University College Galway allowed UCC retain the title and give English, who finished as the season's top scorer, a second Fitzgibbon Cup medal.

English added a third successive Fitzgibbon Cup medal to his collection in 1983, as UCC secured the three-in-a-row following a 3–12 to 1–3 of University College Galway once again.

UCC's great run of success continued in 1984. A narrow 0–7 to 0–5 defeat of fierce rivals University College Dublin gave English a fourth successive Fitzgibbon Cup medal.

In 1985 English was appointed captain of the team as UCC sought a record-equaling fifth successive championship. A 1–15 to 1–7 defeat of University College Galway gave English a remarkable fifth successive Fitzgibbon Cup medal, in what was his last game in the competition. He remains one of the few players to have never lost a Fitzgibbon Cup game.

=== Club ===
In 1989 English enjoyed his first success with the Lattin–Cullen club. A victory in the intermediate football final gave him his first championship medal.

Three years later in 1992 English was captain of the Lattin–Cullen junior team. He guided the team to county success that year, collecting a junior championship medal following success in the final.

After four years in the intermediate hurling grade, Lattin–Cullen triumphed once again. A victory in the final gave English another championship medal, while the club also gained promotion to the senior grade.

=== Minor and under-21 ===
English first played for Tipperary as a member of the minor football team in 1979. He was eligible for that grade once again the following year, while he also joined the Tipperary minor hurling team. He won a Munster medal that year following a 1–17 to 1–4 defeat of Limerick. The subsequent All-Ireland decider pitted Tipperary against Wexford. A 2–15 to 1–10 victory gave English an All-Ireland Minor Hurling Championship medal.

By 1981 English had joined the Tipperary under-21 team. He won a Munster medal that year following a 1–15 to 0–10 defeat of Cork, before later lining out in the All-Ireland decider. A 2–16 to 1–10 defeat of Kilkenny gave English an All-Ireland medal in that grade.

English won a second Munster medal in 1983 following a 2–17 to 3–8 defeat of Clare, however, Tipperary were later bested by Galway in the All-Ireland decider.

=== Senior ===
English made his senior debut on 30 May 1982 in a 1–19 to 2–8 Munster semi-final defeat by Cork. It was a difficult era for the Tipperary senior team, who had gone a decade without All-Ireland or provincial success.

His second championship season also brought an early exit, while Tipperary lost back-to-back Munster titles to Cork in 1984 and 1985. In spite of these defeats, English's contribution to the game was acknowledged at the end of each year when he collected three successive All-Star awards.

In 1987 English lined out in a third provincial decider, as Tipperary seemed to be improving under new manager "Babs" Keating. Cork provided the opposition and were going for a record-breaking sixth successive championship, however, early in the second half English scored a remarkable goal when he kicked the sliotar to the net after losing his hurley. That famous score put Tipperary ahead by seven points, however, Cork came roaring back to salvage a 1–18 apiece draw. English was also on hand in the replay to snatch a late goal to secure another draw and send the game to extra-time. Substitute Michael Doyle bagged two more goals while Donie O'Connell made it four to secure a 4–22 to 1–22 victory. It was English's first Munster medal, while he was later presented with a fourth All-Star.

English added a league medal to his collection in 1988 following a 3–15 to 2–9 defeat of Offaly. He later won a second successive Munster medal as Cork were easily accounted for by 2–19 to 1–13. On 4 September 1988 Tipperary faced Galway in the All-Ireland decider, with English being named as captain in place of the dropped Pat O'Neill. Galway had defeated Tipp in the semi-final the previous year, however, with an extra year's experience it was expected that Tipperary might shade the victory. Galway used this to motivate themselves. Noel Lane again scored the crucial goal for Galway while English sent a late penalty over the bar for a point. A 1–15 to 0–14 score line resulted in defeat, however, English finished the year with a fifth All-Star.

Tipperary made it a provincial three-in-a-row in 1989, with English winning his third Munster medal following a 0–26 to 2–8 defeat of an overtly physical Waterford. On 3 September 1989 Tipperary faced Antrim in a unique All-Ireland final. The game was a one-sided affair from start to finish, with English setting a new scoring record by bagging 2–12 in the 4–24 to 3–9 victory. It was his first All-Ireland medal. English finished off the year with a sixth All-Star and the Texaco Hurler of the Year award.

After surrendering their provincial and All-Ireland crowns in 1990, Tipperary bounced back the following year. Another thrilling provincial decider with Cork followed, with a legitimate late English equaliser being denied. Pat Fox saved the day for Tipp to secure a draw. The replay saw Tipp come from nine points down to record a remarkable 4–19 to 4–15 victory and a fourth Munster medal for English. On 1 September 1991 Tipperary faced old rivals Kilkenny in the All-Ireland decider. The opening thirty-five minutes saw both sides trade score-for-score, however, a controversial 20-metre free, miss-hit by Michael Cleary, landed in the net and gave Tipp a lead which they never surrendered. The final score of 1–16 to 0–15 resulted in a second All-Ireland medal for English.

In 1993 English won a fifth Munster medal following a huge 3–27 to 2–12 trouncing of Clare. After coming on as a substitute he earned the ire of the Clare players and supporters, who many believed he was laughing at the Clare performance after pointing an easy score.

English continued playing with Tipp until his retirement in 1996.

=== Inter-provincial ===
English represented Munster in the inter-provincial series of games on a number of occasions. He was first called up to the provincial team in 1984 and later won his first Railway Cup medal following a 1–18 to 2–9 defeat of arch rivals Leinster.

Munster made it two-in-a-row in 1985, with English collecting a second winners' medal following a 3–6 to 1–11 defeat of Connacht.

English lined out with Munster for six of the next seven seasons, however, Munster went into decline during this period.

== Managerial career ==
Nicky English
Sport
Inter-county management
- Years: Team
- 1998–2002: Tipperary
Inter-county titles as manager
County	League	Province	All-Ireland
Tipperary	1	1	1

=== Tipperary ===
On 7 August 1998 English was appointed manager of the Tipperary senior team. Success was immediate in his first season, with Tipperary winning the National League following a 1–14 to 1–10 defeat of Galway.

After two disappointing championship campaigns, Tipperary bounced back in 2001 with a 1–19 to 0–17 defeat of Clare to take a second league title under English's tenure. He later guided the team to a first Munster success since his own playing days, after a 2–16 to 1–17 defeat of Limerick. On 9 September 2001 Tipperary faced Galway in the All-Ireland decider. The westerners put it up to Tipp, however, two goals by Mark O'Leary gave the Munster men the threshold to withstand a Galway comeback. With nine minutes to go Galway were only a point in arrears, however, Tipperary outscored Galway by five to three in those closing minutes. At the final whistle Tipperary were the winners by 2–18 to 2–15.

Tipperary surrendered their Munster crown to Waterford in 2002, before later exiting the championship with a defeat by Kilkenny at the All-Ireland semi-final stage. English stepped down as Tipperary manager on 24 September 2002.

=== Perennial contender ===
English has been linked to various managerial positions in recent years, however, he has not taken on any role due to work commitments. In 2010 he was regarded as a possible contender to succeed Liam Sheedy as Tipperary manager, a role he was linked to again in 2012 following the resignation of Declan Ryan. Following the departure of Anthony Daly as Dublin manager in 2014, English was also linked to that post.

== Career statistics ==
=== Inter-county ===
Team	Year	National League			Munster		All-Ireland		Total	
Team	Year	Division	Apps	Score	Apps	Score	Apps	Score	Apps	Score
Tipperary	1981-82	Division 1A	8	0-15	1	0-01	—		9	0-16
Tipperary	1982-83	Division 1	6	2-06	2	0-02	—		8	2-08
Tipperary	1983-84	Division 2	8	3-10	2	1-04	—		10	4-14
Tipperary	1984-85	Division 1	3	0-03	3	4-04	—		6	4-07
Tipperary	1985-86	Division 2	7	3-20	0	0-00	—		7	3-20
Tipperary	1986-87	Division 2	8	4-29	4	5-09	1	0-06	13	9-44
Tipperary	1987-88	Division 1	10	7-33	1	0-09	2	1-13	13	8-55
Tipperary	1988-89	Division 1	6	0-14	2	2-18	2	2-20	10	4-52
Tipperary	1989-90	Division 1	4	0-02	2	1-11	—		6	1-13
Tipperary	1990-91	Division 1	2	2-01	2	1-03	2	0-00	6	3-04
Tipperary	1991-92	Division 1A	4	3-07	1	0-00	—		5	3-07
Tipperary	1992-93	Division 1A	5	0-07	1	0-00	1	0-01	7	0-08
Tipperary	1993-94	Division 1	6	2-09	0	0-00	—		6	2-09
Tipperary	1994-95	Division 1	2	0-03	2	0-06	—		4	0-09
Tipperary	1995-96	Division 1	2	1-00	4	0-07	—		6	1-07
Career total			81	27-189	27	14-74	8	3-40	116	34-303

== Honours ==
=== Player ===
University College Cork

- Fitzgibbon Cup (5): 1981, 1982, 1983, 1984, 1985

Lattin–Cullen

- Tipperary Intermediate Hurling Championship (1): 1996
- Tipperary Intermediate Football Championship (1): 1989
- Tipperary Junior Hurling Championship (1): 1992 (c)

Tipperary

- All-Ireland Senior Hurling Championship (2): 1989, 1991
- Munster Senior Hurling Championship (5): 1987, 1988, 1989, 1991, 1993
- National Hurling League (2): 1993-94 1987–88
- All-Ireland Under-21 Hurling Championship (1): 1981
- Munster Under-21 Hurling Championship (2): 1981, 1983
- All-Ireland Minor Hurling Championship (1): 1980
- Munster Minor Hurling Championship (1): 1980

Munster

- Railway Cup (2): 1984, 1985

=== Individual ===
Awards

- Tipperary Hurling Team of the Century: Left corner-forward
- Fitzgibbon Cup Team of the Century: Right corner-forward
- 125 greatest hurlers of the GAA: No. 11
- Munster Hurling Team of the Last 25 Years (1984–2009): Left corner-forward
- Texaco Hurler of the Year (1): 1989
- Supreme Hurling All-Star (1): 2001
- All-Star (6): 1983, 1984, 1985, 1987, 1988, 1989
- All-Ireland Senior Hurling Championship Final Man of the Match (1): 1989
- GAA Hall of Fame Inductee: 2019
- In May 2020, a public poll conducted by RTÉ.ie named English in the full-forward line alongside Eoin Kelly and Séamus Callanan in a team of hurlers who had won All Stars during the era of The Sunday Game.
- Also in May 2020, the Irish Independent named English at number seven in its "Top 20 hurlers in Ireland over the past 50 years".

Awards
Preceded by Tony Keady (Galway)	Texaco Hurler of the Year; 1989	Succeeded by Tony O'Sullivan (Cork)
Achievements
Preceded by Tony Keady (Galway)	All-Ireland Senior Hurling Final; Man of the Match; 1989	Succeeded by Tomás Mulcahy (Cork)
Preceded by Brian Cody (Kilkenny)	All-Ireland Senior Hurling Final winning manager 2001	Succeeded by Brian Cody (Kilkenny)
Sporting positions
Preceded by Pat O'Neill	Tipperary Senior Hurling Captain; 1988	Succeeded by Bobby Ryan
Preceded by Len Gaynor	Tipperary Senior Hurling Manager; 1998–2002	Succeeded by Michael Doyle
