= 1991 Tipperary Senior Hurling Championship =

Annual hurling competition season

- Dates: 13 October – 10 November 1991
- Teams: 8
- Champions: Cashel King Cormacs (1st title); Colm Bonnar (captain); Justin McCarthy (manager)
- Runners-up: Holycross-Ballycahill; Phil Dwyer (captain); Francis Loughnane (manager)

Tournament statistics
- Matches played: 8
- Goals scored: 26 (3.25 per match)
- Points scored: 170 (21.25 per match)
- Top scorer(s): Tommy Grogan (1-18)

The 1991 Tipperary Senior Hurling Championship was the 100th staging of the Tipperary Senior Hurling Championship since its establishment by the Tipperary County Board in 1887. The championship began on 13 October 1991 and ended on 10 November 1991.

Holycross-Ballycahill were the defending champions.

On 10 November 1991, Cashel King Cormacs won the title after a 2–08 to 1–05 defeat of Holycross-Ballycahill in the final at Semple Stadium. It remains their only championship title.

== Participating teams ==
Championship	Champions	Runners-up
Mid Tipperary Senior Hurling Championship	Holycross-Ballycahill	Moycarkey-Borris
North Tipperary Senior Hurling Championship	Toomevara	Nenagh Éire Óg
South Tipperary Senior Hurling Championship	Killenaule	Carrick Swans
West Tipperary Senior Hurling Championship	Cashel King Cormacs	Cappawhite

== Results ==
=== Quarter-finals ===
29 September 1991 Quarter-final	Cappawhite	2-18 - 0-13	Killenaule	Golden
	J O'Neill 2-2, P O'Neill 0-8, G O'Neill 0-3, A O'Neill 0-3, S Carroll 0-1, D Quirke 0-1.		T Shelly 0-6, J O'Dwyer 0-3, D Ahern 0-1, M Brennan 0-1, J Lyons 0-1, M Hassett 0-1.	Referee: J McDonnell (Roscrea)

29 September 1991 Quarter-final	Cashel King Cormacs	4-18 - 1-07	Carrick Swans	Golden
	T Grogan 0-11, M Perdue 1-1, J Grogan 1-0, D McGrath 1-0, B Fitzelle 1-0, Colm Bonnar 0-3, J O'Donoghue 0-2, TJ Connolly 0-1.		T Waters 1-0, M O'Halloran 0-3, MJ Russell 0-2, G Walsh 0-1, D Hogan 0-1.	Referee: PJ Kelly (Ballinahinch)

13 October 1991 Quarter-final	Toomevara	2-09 - 1-10	Moycarkey-Borris	Semple Stadium
	Tommy Dunne 0-5, P King 1-0, Tony Dunne 1-0, T Delaney 0-2, M Nolan 0-1, L Flaherty 0-1.		K Ralph 0-6, J Caesar 1-1, J Corcoran 0-1, D Fogarty 0-1, L Hackett 0-1.	Referee: T Lonergan (Kilsheelan)

13 October 1991 Quarter-final	Holycross-Ballycahill	2-03 - 0-09	Nenagh Éire Óg	Semple Stadium
	P Slattery 1-1, P Cahill 1-0, T Lannigan 0-1, D Carr 0-1.		M Cleary 0-4, E Tucker 0-2, J Kennedy 0-2, J Heffernan 0-1.	Referee: W Barrett (Ardfinnan)

19 October 1991 Quarter-final replay	Holycross-Ballycahill	4-06 - 1-14	Nenagh Éire Óg	Semple Stadium
	T Lanigan 2-0, T Fogarty 1-1, W Ryan 1-0, D Carr 0-3, P Maher 0-2.		M Cleary 0-4, R Tomlinson 0-4, N Corbett 1-0, E Tucker 0-3, P Kennedy 0-2, M Kennedy 0-1.	Referee: W Barrett (Ardfinnan)

=== Semi-finals ===
27 October 1991 Semi-final	Cashel King Cormacs	2-10 - 0-13	Toomevara	Semple Stadium
	Cormac Bonnar 2-1, TJ Connolly 0-4, T Grogan 0-3, R Ryan 0-1, P Fitzelle 0-1.		M Nolan 0-4, T Dunne 0-3, T Carroll 0-2, L Flaherty 0-2, M Murphy 0-1, P King 0-1.	Referee: M Greene (Upperchurch-Drombane)

27 October 1991 Semi-final	Holycross-Ballycahill	1-17 - 3-10	Cappawhite	Semple Stadium
	D Carr 0-7, T Lanigan 0-5, P Cahill 1-0, P Slattery 0-3, T Fogarty 0-2.		G O'Neill 1-3, P O'Neill 1-2, A O'Neill 1-1, M McDermott 0-2, G Ryan 0-1, S Carroll 0-1.	Referee: M Cahill (Kilruane MacDonaghs)

=== Final ===
10 November 1991 Final	Cashel King Cormacs	2-08 - 1-05	Holycross-Ballycahill	Semple Stadium
	T Grogan 1-4, Cormac Bonnar 1-0, TJ Connolly 0-2, J O'Donoghue 0-1, Conal Bonnar 0-1.		P Cahill 1-0, D Carr 0-3, P Slattery 0-1, M Doyle 0-1.	Referee: J McDonnell (Roscrea)

== Championship statistics ==
=== Top scorers ===
Top scorers overall

Rank	Player	Club	Tally	Total	Matches	Average
1	Tommy Grogan	Cashel King Cormacs	1-18	21	3	7.00
2	Declan Carr	Holycross-Ballycahill	0-14	14	4	3.50
3	Pa O'Neill	Cappawhite	1-10	13	2	6.50
4	Tony Lanigan	Holycross-Ballycahill	2-06	12	4	3.00
5	Tommy Grogan	Cashel King Cormacs	3-01	10	3	3.33
6	Pat Cahill	Holycross-Ballycahill	3-00	9	4	2.25
6	Ger O'Neill	Cappawhite	1-06	9	2	4.50
8	John O'Neill	Cappawhite	2-02	8	2	4.00
8	Paul Slattery	Holycross-Ballycahill	1-05	8	4	2.00
8	Tommy Dunne	Toomevara	0-08	8	2	4.00
8	Michael Cleary	Nenagh Éire Óg	0-08	8	2	4.00

Top scorers in a single game

Rank	Player	Club	Tally	Total	Opposition
1	Tommy Grogan	Cashel King Cormacs	0-11	11	Carrick Swans
2	John O'Neill	Cappawhite	2-02	8	Killenaule
2	Pa O'Neill	Cappawhite	0-08	8	Killenaule
4	Cormac Bonnar	Cashel King Cormacs	2-01	7	Toomevara
4	Tommy Grogan	Cashel King Cormacs	1-04	7	Holycross-Ballycahill
4	Declan Carr	Holycross-Ballycahill	0-07	7	Cappawhite
7	Tony Lanigan	Holycross-Ballycahill	2-00	6	Nenagh Éire Óg
7	Ger O'Neill	Cappawhite	1-03	6	Holycross-Ballycahill
7	Tony Shelly	Cappawhite	0-06	6	Killenaule
7	Ken Ralph	Moycarkey-Borris	0-06	6	Toomevara
