= Colm Bonnar =

Irish hurler & manager (born 1964)

Personal information
- Native name: Colm Ó Cnáimhsí (Irish)
- Born: 12 June 1964 (age 62) Cashel, County Tipperary, Ireland
- Occupation: Sport development officer
- Height: 5 ft 11 in (180 cm)

Sport
- Sport: Hurling
- Position: Midfield
Clubs
- Years: Club
- 1982–1996; 2000 1997–2004: Cashel King Cormac's; Dunhill
Club titles
- Tipperary titles: 1
- Munster titles: 1
- All-Ireland Titles: 0
Inter-county*
Years	County	Apps (scores)
1986–1998	Tipperary	35 (0–06)
Inter-county titles
- Munster titles: 5
- All-Irelands: 2
- NHL: 1
- All Stars: 1
- *Inter County team apps and scores correct as of 22:50, 14 May 2019.

Colm Bonnar (born 12 June 1964) is an Irish hurling manager and former player. He is the former manager of the Tipperary senior hurling team having served as manager from September 2021 to July 2022.

He is also the former manager of the Carlow senior hurling team. Bonnar played for club sides Cashel King Cormacs and Dunhill and was a member of the Tipperary senior hurling team for 13 seasons, during which time he usually lined out at midfield.

Bonnar began his hurling career at club level with Cashel King Cormacs. He broke onto the club's top adult team after championship success in the minor and under-21 grades. Bonnar enjoyed his greatest success when he captained the club to the 1991 Munster Club Championship. He later transferred to the Dunhill club in Waterford.

At the inter-county level, Bonnar was part of the successful Tipperary minor team that won the All-Ireland Championship in 1982. He then won back-to-back Munster Championships with the under-21 team in 1983 and 1984. He joined the Tipperary senior team in 1985. From his debut, Bonnar was ever-present as a midfielder and made numerous National League and Championship appearances in a career that ended with his last game in 1998. During that time he was part of two All-Ireland Championship-winning-winning teams – in 1989, 1991. Bonnar also secured five Munster Championship medals and a National Hurling League medal.

Bonnar won an All-Star in 1988. At inter-provincial level, Bonnar was selected to play in five championship campaigns with Munster and won Railway Cup medals in 1995, 1996, and 1997.

After retiring as a player, Bonnar served as a selector and team trainer with the Waterford senior hurling team, with whom he won a Munster Championship in 2002. After an unsuccessful tenure as a selector with the Tipperary senior team, he later guided the Waterford Institute of Technology to four Fitzgibbon Cup titles in six years. Bonnar served as manager of the Wexford senior hurling team for three seasons and, after a period away from inter-county management, took charge of the Carlow senior team, with whom he has won Christy Ring Cup and Joe McDonagh Cup titles.

== Biography ==
Colm Bonnar was born in Cashel, County Tipperary, in 1964. The eighth of thirteen children born to a couple who had strong links to County Donegal, he was educated at the local national school and later attended Cashel CBS. There, Bonnar's skills at both hurling and Gaelic football came to the fore. He won Croke, Fitzgerald and McGabhann Cup winners' medals in both codes. In 1980 and 1982, Bonnar captured two All-Ireland 'B' Colleges hurling medals with the school.

== Playing career ==
=== Cashel King Cormacs ===
Bonnar joined the Cashel King Cormacs club at a young age and played in all grades at juvenile and underage levels. On 28 September 1980, he won a Tipperary Minor Championship medal after lining out at midfield in a 2-11 to 0-07 defeat of Thurles Sarsfields in the final.

Bonnar subsequently joined the Cashel King Cormacs, senior team. He enjoyed his first success at senior level on 24 July 1988 when he won a West Tipperary Senior Championship medal from centre-back after a 1-12 to 1-04 defeat of Kickhams.

On 12 August 1990, Bonnar was at midfield when Cashel faced Clonoulty-Rossmore in the West Tipperary Senior Championship final. He ended the game with a second winners' medal following a 2-11 to 0-15 victory. Cashel later qualified for the Tipperary Senior Championship final on 14 October. Bonnar was again at midfield for the 0-13 to 0-10 defeat by Holycross-Ballycahill.

Bonnar took over the captaincy of the Cashel senior team from his brother Cormac in 1991. He won a third West Tipperary Senior Championship medal on 22 September after Cashel retained the title with a 0-12 to 0-08 defeat of Cappawhite in the final. On 10 November, Bonnar captained the team from midfield when they faced Holycross-Ballycahill in the Tipperary Senior Championship final. A 2-08 to 1-05 victory secured the title for Cashel. On 8 December, Bonnar captained Cashel to the Munster Championship title following a 0-09 to 0-06 defeat of Midleton in the final.

On 29 July 1993, Bonnar was at midfield when Cashel King Cormacs faced Kickhams in the West Tipperary Senior Championship final. He ended the game with a fourth winners' medal and the man of the match award following a 2-15 to 2-12 victory.

On 2 October 1994, Bonnar captained Cashel from midfield in the Tipperary Senior Championship final. He ended the game on the losing side following a 2-11 to 1-09 victory for Toomevara. Despite this defeat, Cashel retained the West Tipperary Championship on 16 October 1994. Bonnar collected a fifth winners' medal following the 2-08 to 1-09 defeat of Clonoulty-Rossmore in the delayed final replay.

Bonnar won a sixth West Tipperary Senior Championship medal on 27 August 1995. He lined out at midfield in the 2-11 to 0-10 defeat of Kickhams. This remains Cashel's last divisional championship triumph.

=== Dunhill ===
In October 1996, Bonnar announced that he was transferring from Cashel King Cormacs to the Dunhill club in Waterford. He made his first appearance for his new club on 20 July 1997 in a 0-12 to 0-09 defeat by Tallow.

=== Tipperary ===
==== Minor and Under-21 ====
Bonnar first lined out for Tipperary as a member of the minor team during the 1982 Munster Championship. He made his first appearance on 12 May when he lined out at right corner-back in a 2-05 to 0-10 defeat of Cork. On 18 July, Bonnar won a Munster Championship medal following a 1-10 to 1-07 defeat of Limerick in the final. This victory secured a place in the All-Ireland final on 5 September. Bonnar lined out at left corner-back and collected a winners' medal following the 2-07 to 0-04 defeat of Galway.

Bonnar was drafted onto the Tipperary under-21 team for the 1983 Munster Championship. On 27 July 1983, he was at left corner-back when Tipperary defeated Clare by 2-17 to 3-08 to win the Munster Championship. Bonnar was switched to right corner-back for the All-Ireland final on 11 September, however, Tipperary suffered a 0-12 to 0-06 defeat by Galway.

On 25 July 1984, Bonnar won a second successive Munster Championship medal following a 0-12 to 1-08 defeat of Limerick in the final. He was selected at left corner-back for the All-Ireland final against Kilkenny on 22 August. For the second year in succession Bonnar ended on the losing side following a 1-12 to 0-11 defeat.

Bonnar won a third consecutive Munster Championship medal at left corner-back on 12 July 1985 following a 1-16 to 4-05 defeat of Clare. He was named in the same position for the All-Ireland final against Kilkenny on 25 August. Bonnar ended the game with an All-Ireland medal following a 1-10 to 2-06 victory.

==== Junior ====
Bonnar was in his final season with the under-21 team when he was drafted onto the Tipperary junior panel. On 5 July 1985, he won a Munster Championship medal after coming on as a substitute in Tipperary's 3-06 to 1-10 defeat of Limerick. On 18 August, Bonnar was selected at midfield for the All-Ireland final against Wexford. He ended the game on the losing side following a 3-09 to 1-13 defeat.

==== Senior ====
In 1986 Bonnar made his debut with the Tipperary senior hurling team. It was an unsuccessful year as Tipp were eliminated from the provincial championship at the first hurdle.

1987 saw Bonnar retain his place on the team. It was a successful year for Tipp as the county won its first Munster title in sixteen years following a dramatic draw and a replay with Cork in FitzGerald Stadium, Killarney . In the subsequent All-Ireland semi-final Galway put an end to Tipp's dream season with a 3–20 to 2–17 defeat.

1988 began well for Bonnar as he added a National Hurling League medal to his collection. He later captured his second Munster medal following another victory over Cork. A subsequent defeat of Antrim allowed Tipp to advance to the All-Ireland final where Galway provided the opposition. With an extra year's experience, it was expected that Tipp might shade the victory. Galway, however, used this to motivate themselves. Noel Lane scored the crucial goal for Galway while Nicky English sent a late penalty over the bar for a point. A 1–15 to 0–14 score line resulted in victory for Galway and defeat for Bonnar.

In 1989 Tipperary was still the best team in Munster and Bonnar won his third provincial title in a row after a 0–26 to 2–8 trouncing of Waterford. For the third time in as many years, Tipp faced Galway in the All-Ireland series, however, on this occasion the men from the West were without their star player Tony Keady. The game turned out to be a tense and unsavory affair as Tipp finally triumphed over Galway. Antrim, the surprise winners of the other semi-final, provided the opposition in the subsequent All-Ireland final. It was an historic occasion as it was only the second appearance of an Ulster team in the championship decider. Antrim's relative inexperience robbed the final of any real element of contest and Tipp romped home to a 4–24 to 3–9 win. Because of this Tipp preserved their record of being the only team to win an All-Ireland title in every decade in GAA history. It was Bonnar's first senior All-Ireland medal.

In 1990 Tipperary surrendered their Munster crown to Cork for the first time in four years. This defeat followed Babs Keating's infamous remark about Cork that 'donkeys don't win derbies'.

Tipp returned in 1991 and defeated Cork in a thrilling Munster final replay giving Bonnar his fourth provincial medal. The subsequent All-Ireland final saw Tipp take on Kilkenny for the first time in twenty years. A freak goal by Michael Cleary in the first half gave Tipp a lead which they never surrendered. A 1–16 to 0–15 victory allowed Bonnar to capture his second All-Ireland medal in three years.

1992 saw Tipp exit the championship at an early stage, however, the team bounced back for one last hurrah in 1993. That year Bonnar added a fifth Munster medal to his collection as Tipp trounced Clare by 3–27 to 2–12. The subsequent All-Ireland semi-final saw Tipp renew their rivalry with Galway; however, on this occasion, Galway took the spoils. This defeat brought the curtain down on Tipp's great revival.

After defeat after a draw and a replay in the Munster final of 1996, Bonnar lined out in a second consecutive provincial decider in 1997. Clare provided the opposition on that occasion, however, it was an occasion to forget for Bonnar as Tipp lost a close and exciting game by 1–18 to 0–18. The introduction of the new 'back-door system resulted in both Clare and Tipperary meeting for the second time in the first all-Munster All-Ireland final. The game itself was one of the best of the decade. Clare was well on top for much of the game, however, Liam Cahill and Eugene O'Neill scored twice for Tipp in the last ten minutes. John Leahy missed a goal chance in the last minute while another Tipp point was controversially ruled wide. At the full-time whistle Clare won by a single point – 0–20 to 2–13.

Following defeat in the 1998 provincial championship, Bonnar decided to retire from inter-county hurling.

== Managerial career ==
=== Waterford ===
On 13 September 1999, Bonnar joined the Waterford senior hurling team's five-man selection committee under Gerald McCarthy. His first season as a selector and assistant coach saw Waterford finish in second place in Division 1B after the group stage of the National League. Waterford exited the league on 30 April 2000 following a 2-15 to 1-15 defeat by Galway at the semi-final stage. On 28 May, Waterford's season came to an end following a 0-17 to 0-14 defeat by Tipperary in the Munster Championship.

Bonnar's second season as a selector saw Waterford enjoy an indifferent National League campaign. His side failed to make it to the knock-out stage after losing three games and finishing in fifth position in the group table. Waterford's championship campaign ended on 10 June following a 4-11 to 2-14 defeat by Limerick. Gerald McCarthy stepped down as manager following this defeat and was replaced by Justin McCarthy. Bonnar was retained as part of the new management team.

Waterford had a mid-table finish in Division 1A of the 2002 National League and failed to make the knock-out stages for the second year in succession. On 30 June, Waterford defeated Tipperary by 2-23 to 3-12 to win the Munster Championship for the first time in 39 years. Bonnar had mixed emotions following the defeat of his native county: "I was over the moon for Waterford but I wasn't as caught up in it. I knew what the Tipp lads were going through. I could not race onto the field or jump around...I was proud to be part of that team but those 15 minutes after the match, it was a strange place to be."

Bonnar's fourth and final season with Waterford saw the team fail to make the knock-out stage of the National League for the third year in succession. On 29 June 2003, Waterford reached a second successive Munster final, however, Cork were the eventual winners by 3-16 to 3-12. Bonnar stepped down from the management team following Waterford's exit from the championship.

=== Wexford ===
Bonnar was confirmed as manager of the Wexford senior hurling team, in succession to John Meyler, on 11 November 2008. His team was knocked out of the 2009 Leinster Championship at the semi-final stage by Dublin, and lost to Limerick in the qualifiers, leaving them in a situation where they had to play a relegation play-off against Antrim. Bonnar was unhappy about the possibility that his team could potentially play in Christy Ring Cup rather than the All Ireland Series in 2010. He and the managers of the other teams involved in the play-offs appealed to the GAA's Disputes Resolution Authority, who took the decision to postpone the relegation final until a future date. The Director General of the GAA suggested that the relegation final would be played, but that no team would end up being relegated and that a decision would be made on the issue in early October 2009.

In July 2011 he resigned as manager of Wexford after the defeat to Limerick in the 2011 qualifiers.

=== Carlow ===
==== 2017 Season ====
On 30 August 2016, Bonnar was ratified as manager of the Carlow senior hurling team. In the early stages of his first season in charge, he admitted to being impressed with the attitude of the players: "Without the players, we don't have anything. They have created the right values and standards about what we are trying to achieve. They have a big part to play in it, they have all bought into it, we are delighted with that, and I'm really enjoying it.” Bonnar's side enjoyed some good form in the National League and remained undefeated in Division 2A. On 31 March 2017, Carlow suffered a 2-12 to 0-15 defeat by Antrim in the Division 2A final.

On 22 April 2017, Bonnar's side suffered a 3-20 to 2-22 defeat by Antrim in their opening game of the Christy Ring Cup. Despite this, Carlow qualified for the final on 10 June. For the fourth time in as many months, Antrim provided the opposition, however, Bonnar's side claimed the title with a 5-23 to 4-15 victory.

==== 2018 Season ====
Bonnar's side opened their 2018 National League campaign with a 0-19 to 0-15 defeat by Westmeath on 28 January 2018. Carlow won their remaining group stage games and qualified for the final on 24 March. Bonnar's side defeated Westmeath by 2-19 to 2-12 and secured promotion.

A restructuring of the various hurling tiers saw Carlow added to the new Joe McDonagh Cup for the 2018 season. Bonnar's side topped the group after suffering just one defeat in their five games. On 1 July, Carlow won the title and promotion to the Leinster Championship following a 2-26 to 1-24 defeat of Westmeath in the final.

==== 2019 Season ====
Bonnar's side failed to secure a win in Division 1B, however, Carlow managed draws with Galway and Laois. On 10 March, Carlow retained their Division 1B status for 2020 after a 2-14 to 1-16 play-off victory over Offaly. Carlow lost all four games in the 2019 Leinster Senior Hurling Championship and was relegated to the 2020 Joe McDonagh Cup.

==== 2020 Season ====
Carlow finished fourth in the round-robin stages of the 2020 Joe McDonagh Cup. Bonnar left the Carlow job in November 2020, having served for four years.

=== Tipperary ===
==== 2022 Season ====
On 8 September 2021, Bonnar was announced as the new Tipperary senior hurling manager on a three-year term. On 8 January 2022, in his first game in charge, Tipperary lost to Kerry by 0-14 to 0-17 in Tralee in the quarter-final of the 2022 Munster Senior Cup. His first championship game in charge was on 17 April 2022, a 2-24 to 2-20 defeat to Waterford in the opening round of the 2022 Munster Hurling Championship. Tipperary went on to lose all four games in the 2022 Munster Championship and finished bottom of the table and failed to qualify for the All-Ireland Championship.

On 13 July 2022, the Tipperary management committee at a meeting voted for change and decided to relieve Bonnar from his duties as Tipperary senior hurling manager after one year. Bonnar speaking after the decision said “I am extremely disappointed with the decision of the executive committee of Tipperary GAA regarding my position as Tipperary senior hurling manager".

== Honours ==
=== Player ===
Waterford Institute of Technology

- Fitzgibbon Cup: 1995 (c)

Cashel King Cormacs

- Munster Senior Club Hurling Championship: 1991
- Tipperary Senior Hurling Championship: 1991

Tipperary

- All-Ireland Senior Hurling Championship: 1989, 1991
- Munster Senior Hurling Championship: 1987, 1988, 1989, 1991, 1993
- National Hurling League: 1987-88
- Munster Junior Hurling Championship: 1985
- All-Ireland Under-21 Hurling Championship: 1985
- Munster Under-21 Hurling Championship: 1983, 1984, 1985
- All-Ireland Minor Hurling Championship: 1982
- Munster Minor Hurling Championship: 1982
- Munster Intermediate Hurling Championship: 2000
- All-Ireland Intermediate Hurling Championship: 2000

Munster

- Railway Cup: 1995, 1996, 1997

=== Individual ===
Awards

- GAA GPA All Stars Awards: 1988

=== Management ===
Waterford Institute of Technology

- Fitzgibbon Cup: 1992, 2003, 2004, 2006, 2008, 2014

Ballyhale Shamrocks

- All-Ireland Senior Club Hurling Championship: 2015
- Leinster Senior Club Hurling Championship: 2014
- Kilkenny Senior Hurling Championship: 2014

Waterford (Selector)

- Munster Senior Hurling Championship: 2002

Carlow

- Christy Ring Cup: 2017
- National Hurling League Division 2A: 2018
- Joe McDonagh Cup: 2018

Sporting positions
Preceded by Declan Carr	Tipperary Senior Hurling Team Captain; 1992	Succeeded by Michael O'Meara
Preceded by John Meyler	Wexford Senior Hurling Team Manager; 2008–2011	Succeeded by Liam Dunne
Preceded by Pat English	Carlow Senior Hurling Team Manager; 2016–2020	Succeeded by Tom Mullally
Preceded by Liam Sheedy	Tipperary Senior Hurling Manager; 2021-2022	Succeeded by Liam Cahill
