= Liam Stokes =

Irish hurler and Gaelic footballer

Personal information
- Born: 1964 (age 61–62) Kilsheelan, County Tipperary, Ireland

Sport
- Sport: Hurling
- Position: Full-forward
Club
- Years: Club
- Kilsheelan–Kilcash
Club titles
- Tipperary titles: 0
Inter-county
- Years: County
- 1986-1987 1985-1987: Tipperary (SH); Tipperary (SF)
Inter-county titles
- Munster titles: 1
- All-Irelands: 0
- NHL: 0
- All Stars: 0

Liam Stokes (born 1964) is an Irish former hurler and Gaelic footballer. At club level, he played with Kilsheelan–Kilcash and at inter-county level he was a dual player with the Tipperary senior teams.

== Career ==
At club level, Stokes played at all levels as a dual player with Kilsheelan–Kilcash. He was part of the club's senior team that won the South Tipperary SFC title after a 1-11 to 1-10 defeat of Fethard in 1983.

Stokes first appeared on the inter-county scene with Tipperary during a two-year tenure as a dual player with the minor teams. He won a Munster MHC medal in 1982, before later lining out at full-forward when Tipperary beat Galway by 2-07 to 0-04 in the 1982 All-Ireland minor final. Stokes continued his dual status to under-21 level and won a Munster U21HC title in 1985. He later won an All-Ireland U21HC medal after a 1-10 to 2-06 defeat of Kilkenny in the 1985 All-Ireland under-21 final.

Stokes appeared as a dual player for both of Tipperary's senior teams at various times between 1985 and 1987. He was part of Tipperary's Munster SHC-winning team in 1987. Stokes also appeared for the junior team on a number of occasions and won three Munster JHC medals between 1985 and 1991.

== Honours ==
Kilsheelan–Kilcash

- South Tipperary Senior Football Championship: 1983

Tipperary

- All-Ireland Junior Hurling Championship: 1991
- Munster Junior Hurling Championship: 1985, 1990, 1991
- All-Ireland Under-21 Hurling Championship: 1985
- Munster Under-21 Hurling Championship: 1985
- All-Ireland Minor Hurling Championship: 1982
- Munster Minor Hurling Championship: 1982
