= 1889 Tipperary Senior Hurling Championship =

Annual hurling competition season

- Champions: Moycarkey (1st title); Tom O'Grady (captain)
- Runners-up: Toomevara

The 1889 Tipperary Senior Hurling Championship was the third staging of the Tipperary Senior Hurling Championship since its establishment by the Tipperary County Board in 1887.

Clonoulty were the defending champions.

Moycarkey won the championship after a 1–03 to 1–00 defeat of Toomevara in the final. It was their first championship title.

== CHampionship statistics ==
=== Miscellaneous ===
- Clonoulty-Rossmore won the title for the first time and won't win another until 1989.
