= 1989 All-Ireland Under-21 Hurling Championship =

All-Ireland Under-21 Hurling Championship 1989
Championship Details
- Dates: 7 June 1989 – 10 September 1989
- Teams: 17

All Ireland Champions
- Winners: Tipperary (7th win)
- Captain: Declan Ryan
- Manager: Michael Minogue

All Ireland Runners-up
- Runners-up: Offaly
- Captain: Michael Duignan
- Manager: Pad Joe Whelehan

Provincial Champions
- Munster: Tipperary
- Leinster: Offaly
- Ulster: Antrim
- Connacht: Not Played

Championship Statistics
- Top Scorer: Dan Quirke (7-08)

The 1989 All-Ireland Under-21 Hurling Championship was the 26th staging of the All-Ireland Under-21 Hurling Championship since its establishment by the Gaelic Athletic Association in 1964. The championship began on 7 June 1989 and ended on 10 September 1989.

Cork entered the championship as the defending champions, however, they were beaten by Tipperary in a Munster semi-final replay.

On 10 September 1989, Tipperary won the championship following a 4–10 to 3–11 defeat of Offaly in the All-Ireland final. This was their seventh All-Ireland title overall and their first title since 1985.

Tipperary's Dan Quirke was the championship's top scorer with 7-08.

== Results ==
=== Leinster Under-21 Hurling Championship ===
Quarter-finals

7 June 1989 Quarter-final	Wexford	2-15 - 3-05	Carlow	Palmerstown Sportsfield, Kilkenny
	L O'Leary 1-3, L Dunne 1-2, M O'Leary 0-3, G Kearns 0-3, R Quigley 0-2, S Lacey 0-2.		T Doyle 1-2, J Byrne 1-0, D Murphy 1-0, S Foley 0-2, M Farrell 0-1.	Referee: P Long (Kilkenny)

7 June 1989 Quarter-final	Offaly	6-19 - 0-06	Westmeath	O'Connor Park, Tullamore
	D Pilkington 4-3, B Whelehan 1-3, M Duignan 0-5, T Dooley 1-0, J Pilkington 0-2, D Regan 0-2, B Kelly 0-1, R Mannion 0-1, R Burns 0-1, A Kelly 0-1.		D O'Rourke 0-3, G Savage 0-1, H Pyke 0-1, A Weir 0-1.	Referee: J Rankin (Laois)

Semi-finals

21 June 1989 Semi-final	Kilkenny	3-12 - 1-06	Wexford	Dr. Cullen Park, Carlow
	DJ Carey 1-3, T O'Keeffe 1-2, J Walton 1-1, A Ronan 0-2, J Brennan 0-2, T Murphy 0-1, P Hoban 0-1.		L Dunne 1-3, P Nolan 0-1, G Kearns 0-1, S Lacey 0-1.	Referee: JF Bailey (Dublin)

21 June 1989 Semi-final	Offaly	2-11 - 1-09	Laois	St. Brendan's Park, Birr
	M Duignan 2-3, B Whelehan 0-4, R Mannion 0-1, A Cahill 0-1, J Troy 0-1, J Dooley 0-1.		T Duane 1-4, J Bates 0-3, N Delaney 0-1, N Rigney 0-1.	Referee: J Henry (Westmeath)

Final

23 July 1989 Final	Offaly	3-16 - 3-09	Kilkenny	O'Moore Park, Portlaoise
	M Duignan 1-5, D Pilkington 1-2, G Cahill 1-1, J Dooley 0-3, A Cahill 0-3, R Mannion 0-1, B Dooley 0-1.		A Ronan 1-3, P Hoban 1-2, DJ Carey 1-0, T O'Keeffe 0-2, R Manogue 0-1, J Brennan 0-1.	Referee: P Delaney (Laois)

=== Munster Under-21 Hurling Championship ===
Quarter-finals

21 June 1989 Quarter-final	Cork	5-05 - 2-14	Tipperary	Páirc Uí Chaoimh, Cork
	F O'Brien 2-0, N Aherne 2-0, P O'Brien 1-0, M Sheehan 0-1, M Mullins 0-1, G Manley 0-1, B Corcoran 0-1, D O'Connell 0-1.		T Lanigan 1-3, D Lyons 1-1, D Quirke 0-2, Declan Ryan 0-2, M Nolan 0-2, J Leahy 0-2, Dinny Ryan 0-1, C Bonnar 0-1.	Referee: T Murray (Limerick)

21 June 1989 Quarter-final	Clare	3-06 - 1-10	Waterford	FitzGerald Park, Kilmallock
	B Foley 0-5, J McKenna 1-0, M Daffy 1-0, P Healy 1-0, D Considine 0-1.		N Kelly 1-1, B Sullivan 0-4, M Flanagan 0-3, A Qualter 0-1, D Hanley 0-1.	Referee: G Long (Tipperary)

5 July 1989 Quarter-final replay	Tipperary	1-16 - 1-10	Cork	Semple Stadium, Thurles
	D Quirke 1-1, C Stakelum 0-4, J Leahy 0-4, Dinny Ryan 0-3, DEclan Ryan 0-2, T Lanigan 0-1, P Hogan 0-1.		D O'Connell 1-1, G Manley 0-4, D Quirke 0-1, P O'Brien 0-1, B Cunningham 0-1, J Corcoran 0-1, M Mullins 0-1.

Semi-finals

12 July 1989 Semi-final	Kerry	1-07 - 4-15	Tipperary	Ardfert
	J O'Sullivan 1-1, A O'Connor 0-2, P Healy 0-2, JP Hickey 0-1, F Whelan 0-1.		J Lyons 1-3, Dinny Ryan 1-2, T Lanigan 1-2, C Stakelum 0-4, S Bohan 1-0, K Ryan 0-2, P Hogan 0-1, D Quirke 0-1.

13 July 1989 Semi-final	Limerick	1-13 - 2-05	Clare	Gaelic Grounds, Limerick
	M Houlihan 0-6, R Walsh 1-0, M Galligan 0-3, C Carey 0-2, J O'Donovan 0-1, M Hickey 0-1.		J McKenna 1-0, M Casey 1-0, B Foley 0-2, M Daffey 0-1, G Rogers 0-1, M Baker 0-1.

Final

26 July 1989 Final	Tipperary	5-16 - 1-06	Limerick	Semple Stadium, Thurles
	D Quirke 3-0, J Leahy 0-6, Dinny Ryan 1-2, P Hogan 0-4, D Lyons 1-0, C Stakelum 0-3, T Lanigan 0-1.		M Galligan 0-4, R Walsh 1-0, C Carey 0-1, F Carroll 0-1.	Referee: J Moore (Waterford)

=== Ulster Under-21 Hurling Championship ===
Semi-finals

2 July 1989 Semi-final	Derry	3-04 - 1-06	Down	Lavey
	O Collins 1-3, M McCracken 1-0, J Donaghy 1-0, S McGrellis 0-1.		B Coulter 1-0, N Sands 0-3, G McGrattan 0-1, J McCrickard 0-1, P McCrickard 0-1.	Referee: D Gallagher (Antrim)

2 July 1989 Semi-final	Antrim	2-24 - 0-00	Armagh	Casement Park, Belfast
	M McShane 1-3, N Murray 0-6, J Carson 0-4, G Stirrat 1-0, A McGilligan 0-3, A McAllister 0-3, D McKinley 0-2, M Dennis 0-2, D McNaughton 0-1.			Referee: P Byers (Down)

Final

16 July 1989 Final	Antrim	4-18 - 0-04	Derry	St. Patrick's Park, Loughguile
	M McShane 1-4, J Carson 1-3, N Murray 1-2, J Close 1-1, M Dennis 0-2, G O'Kane 0-2, A McAllsiter 0-2, D Stirrett 0-2.		S McGrellis 0-2, S Heaney 0-1, D Kearns 0-1.

=== All-Ireland Under-21 Hurling Championship ===
Semi-finals

13 August 1989 Semi-final	Tipperary	1-14 - 1-07	Galway	Gaelic Grounds, Limerick
	P Hogan 0-5, J Leahy 0-4, T Lanigan 1-0, D Quirke 0-2, D Ryan 0-1, C Stakelum 0-1, M Nolan 0-1.		P Kelly 0-6, R Duane 1-0, J Rabbitte 0-1.	Referee: P Long (Kilkenny)

20 August 1989 Semi-final	Offaly	5-18 - 0-09	Antrim	Croke Park, Dublin
	D Regan 2-2, D Pilkington 1-2, J Dooley 0-5, R Byrne 1-1, M Duignan 1-0, A Cahill 0-3, B Dooley 0-2, B Kelly 0-1, J Pilkington 0-1, T Kilmartin 0-1.		N Murray 0-4, S McIlhatton 0-1, J Close 0-1, D McKillop 0-1, D McNeill 0-1, C Murphy 0-1.	Referee: J Moore (Waterford)

Final

10 September 1989 Final	Tipperary	4-10 - 3-11	Offaly	O'Connor Park, Tullamore
	D Quirke 3-2, M Nolan 1-1, C Stakelum 0-3, D Ryan 0-1, J Leahy 0-1, P Hogan 0-1, C Bonnar 0-1.		B Dooley 2-0, D Regan 1-2, J Dooley 0-5, J Pilkington 0-2, B Whelehan 0-1, G Cahill 0-1.	Attendance: 30,000; Referee: P Long (Kilkenny)

== Championship statistics ==
=== Top scorers ===
Overall

Rank	Player	Club	Tally	Total	Matches	Average
1	Dan Quirke	Tippearry	7-08	29	6	4.83
2	Declan Pilkington	Offaly	6-07	25	5	5.00
2	Michael Duignan	Offaly	4-13	25	5	5.00
3	John Leahy	Tippearry	0-17	17	6	2.83
4	Tony Lanigan	Tippearry	3-07	16	6	2.66
5	Daithí Regan	Offaly	3-06	15	5	3.00
5	Noel Murray	Antrim	1-12	15	3	5.00
5	Conor Stakelum	Tippearry	0-15	15	6	2.50
6	Johnny Dooley	Offaly	0-14	14	5	2.80
7	Michael McShane	Antrim	2-07	13	3	4.33

In a single game

Rank	Player	Club	Tally	Total	Opposition
1	Declan Pilkington	Offaly	4-03	15	Westmeath
2	Dan Quirke	Tipperary	3-02	11	Offaly
3	Dan Quirke	Tipperary	3-00	9	Limerick
3	Michael Duignan	Offaly	2-03	9	Laois
4	Daithí Regan	Offaly	2-02	8	Antrim
4	Michael Duignan	Offaly	1-05	8	Kilkenny
5	Michael McShane	Antrim	1-04	7	Derry
5	Tony Dunne	Laois	1-04	7	Offaly
