= Michael Duignan (hurler) =

Irish hurler (born 1968)

Personal information
- Native name: Mícheál Ó Duígeannáin (Irish)
- Born: 21 February 1968 (age 58) Banagher, County Offaly, Ireland
- Occupation: Auctioneer
- Height: 6 ft 1 in (185 cm)

Sport
- Sport: Hurling
- Position: Right corner-forward
Clubs
- Years: Club
- St Rynagh's; Raheen; Durrow
Club titles
- Offaly titles: 4
- Leinster titles: 1
Inter-county
Years	County	Apps (scores)
1987–2001	Offaly	43 (7–37)
Inter-county titles
- Leinster titles: 5
- All-Irelands: 2
- NHL: 1
- All Stars: 1

Michael Duignan (/ˈdaɪɡnən/ DYGHE-nən; born 21 February 1968) is an Irish former hurler and current Gaelic games administrator. He served as chairman of the Offaly County Board from 2019–2024.

== Playing career ==
=== St Rynagh's ===
Duignan joined the St Rynagh's club at a young age and played in all grades at juvenile and underage levels before eventually joining the St Rynagh's top adult team at senior level as a 16-year-old.

On 19 October 1986, Duignan lined out at left corner-forward when St Rynagh's qualified to play Coolderry in the final. He scored a point from play and was narrowly denied his first winners' medal after St Rynagh's suffered a 3–8 to 1–10 defeat.

Duignan lined out in a second successive senior final on 27 September 1987. Playing at right corner-forward, he was held scoreless throughout but ended the game with his first championship medal after the 0–11 to 0–9 defeat of Seir Kieran.

Duignan was moved from the forwards to midfield for the 1988 Championship and lined out in that position in a third successive final on 23 October 1988. He ended the game on the losing side after a 3–13 to 4–6 defeat by Seir Kieran.

After a two-year absence, Duignan made a fourth final appearance on 14 October 1990. Lining out at midfield he was held scoreless throughout but claimed a second winners' medal after the 2–6 to 1–7 defeat of Birr.

Duignan was selected at right wing-forward when he lined out in a fifth championship final on 1 November 1992. He was once again held scoreless but collected a third winners' medal following a 0–10 to 0–9 defeat of Lusmagh. Duignan was once again in the half-forward line when St Rynagh's suffered a 2–13 to 0–13 by Buffer's Alley in the Leinster Club SHC final.

On 27 September 1993, Duignan played at full-forward when St Rynagh's qualified for a second successive final. He scored a point from play and won a fourth championship medal following the 1–16 to 1–14 victory over Birr. On 5 December 1993, Duignan lined out in a second successive Leinster Club SHC final. He scored a vital goal after 18 minutes and collected a Leinster Club SHC medal after the 1–14 to 2–10 defeat of Dicksboro.

On 29 October 1995, Duignan lined out at centre-forward when St Rynagh's faced Seir Kieran in the final replay, having earlier missed the drawn match due to being on his honeymoon. He was held scoreless from play in the 0–10 to 0–9 defeat.

St Rynagh's faced Seir Kieran in a second successive final on 13 October 1996. Duignan started the game on the bench but was introduced as a substitute in the 0–13 to 1–8 defeat.

On 8 November 1998, Duignan scored 1–1 from centre-forward when St Rynagh's drew 1–10 to 0–13 with Seir Kieran in the final. He was switched to left corner-forward for the replay on 22 November 1998 but was held scoreless in the 1-11 to 0-09 defeat.

Duignan lined out in his 10th and last championship final on 3 October 1999. He started the game marking county colleague Brian Whelehan but was switched to wing-forward and ended the game on the losing side after a 3–15 to 1–11 defeat.

=== Offaly ===
==== Minor and under-21 ====
Duignan first played for Offaly as a member of the minor team during the 1986 Leinster Championship. He made his first appearance for the team on 24 May 1986 in a 2-08 apiece draw with Kilkenny. On 13 July 1986, Duignan lined out at full-forward when Offaly faced Wexford in the Leinster final. He was switched to midfield in the second half and ended the game with a winners' medal after the 4-07 to 1-05 victory. On 7 September 1986, Duignan was again selected at full-forward when Offaly qualified to play Cork in the All-Ireland final. He scored two points from play and claimed an All-Ireland medal following the 3-12 to 3-09 victory.

Duignan immediately progressed onto the Offaly under-21 team. He made his debut in the grade on 26 April 1987 when he scored a point in the 2019 to 0-03 defeat of Westmeath in the Leinster semi-final. On 10 May 1987, Duignan was held scoreless at left wing-forward when Offaly suffered a 4-11 to 0-05 defeat by Wexford in the Leinster final

On 17 July 1988, Duignan played in a second successive Leinster final when Offaly faced Kilkenny. Lining out at midfield, he ended the game on the losing side after a 3-13 to 2-05 defeat.

Duignan lined out in a third successive Leinster final the following year. Playing at right corner-forward, he top scored for Offaly with 1-05 and collected a winners' medal after the 3-16 to 3-09 defeat of Kilkenny. Duignan was switched to left corner-forward for the All-Ireland final against Tipperary on 10 September 1989. He was held scoreless throughout the 4-10 to 3-11 defeat.

==== Senior ====
Duignan was still eligible for under-21 grade when he was added to the Offaly senior team in advance of the 1987-88 National League. He made his debut for the team on 11 October 1987 when he lined out at left corner-forward in a 3-11 to 0-11 defeat of Laois. On 6 March 1988, Duignan was at midfield when Offaly secured the Division 2 title after a 1-13 to 3-04 defeat of Down. He was later included in the Offaly panel for the Leinster Championship and made his first appearance on 19 June 1988 when he scored two points from midfield in a 2-13 to 2-10 defeat of Dublin. On 10 July 1988, Duignan won his first Leinster Championship medal after again lining out at midfield in a 3-12 to 1-14 defeat of Wexford in the final.

On 9 July 1989, Duignan lined out at right wing-forward when Offaly qualified for a second successive Leinster final. He was held scoreless from play but was instrumental in setting up two goals for Mark Corrigan in the 3-15 to 4-09 defeat of Kilkenny.

Duignan lined out in a third successive Leinster final on 8 July 1990. Playing at right corner-forward he scored two points from play and collected a third successive winners' medal after the 1-19 to 2-11 defeat of Dublin.

On 12 May 1991, Duignan was selected at full-forward when Offaly qualified for their very first National League final. He scored three points from play and claimed a winners' medal as Offaly claimed their very first league title after a 2-06 to 0-10 defeat of Wexford.

After a period without success, Duignan lined out in his fourth Leinster final on 17 July 1994. Playing at left corner-forward he scored a point from play and collected his fourth winners' medal after the 1-18 to 0-14 defeat of Wexford. Duignan, who had been prone to injury, suffered ligament damage during that game and was dropped from the starting fifteen for the All-Ireland final against Limerick on 3 September 1994. He was introduced as a substitute for Daithí Regan, however, Offaly looked like losing the game when they trailed by 2-13 to 1-11 with just five minutes remaining. Two quick goals by Johnny Dooley and Pat O'Connor and five unanswered points secured a remarkable 3-16 to 2-13 victory and a first All-Ireland medal for Duignan.

Duignan overcame his injuries and was restored to the starting fifteen for the 1995 Leinster Championship. He won his fifth Leinster Championship medal on 16 July 1995 after scoring three points from play in the 2-16 to 2-05 defeat of Kilkenny. On 3 September 1995, Duignan lined out at left corner-forward when Offaly faced a Clare team who were making their first All-Ireland final appearance since 1932. He scored a goal from play but ended the game on the losing side after a 1-13 to 2-08 defeat.

On 14 July 1996, Duignan made his sixth Leinster final appearance of his career. He scored 1-01 from midfield but ended the game on the losing side after a 2-23 to 2-15 defeat by Wexford.

On 5 July 1998, Duignan was selected at midfield when Offaly faced Kilkenny in the Leinster final. He was held scoreless from play in the 3-10 to 1-11 defeat. Team manager Babs Keating subsequently resigned after describing the team as "sheep running around in a heap" and was replaced by Michael Bond for the All-Ireland Championship. On 13 September 1998, Offaly qualified for the All-Ireland final where they faced Kilkenny for the second time that season. Duignan scored two points from right wing-forward and collected his second All-Ireland winners' medal after the 2-16 to 1-14 victory. He ended the season by receiving a GAA All-Star.

Duignan made his eighth Leinster final appearance of his career on 11 July 1999. He scored a point from left corner-forward but ended the game on the losing side after a 5-14 to 1-16 defeat by Kilkenny.

On 9 July 2000, Duignan lined out at left corner-forward in his ninth Leinster final appearance. He scored a point from play but ended that game on the losing side after a 2-21 to 1-13 defeat. On 10 September 2000, Duignan was switched to left wing-forward when Offaly suffered a 5-15 to 1-14 defeat by Kilkenny in the All-Ireland final.

Duignan made just two appearances during the 2001 National League, however, he decided to retire from inter-county hurling before the start of the Leinster Championship stating "It was a very, very hard decision after all the years."

== Managerial career ==
=== Meath ===
Duignan was appointed manager of the Meath senior hurling team on 28 November 2001. His opening season in charge saw Meath lose all of their National League games before suffering relegation to Division 2 at the end of the campaign. The subsequent Leinster Championship campaign saw Meath record victories over Carlow and Laois before exiting the provincial championship at the quarter-final stage with a defeat by Dublin. Meath's championship came to an end after a 1-20 to 1-11 defeat by Duignan's native Offaly in the All-Ireland Qualifiers.

Duignan's second National League campaign in charge saw Meath finish in second position in Division 2B before qualifying for the winners' group and a chance to qualify for the final. On 17 April 2003, Duignan and his three selectors withdrew their services after the Meath County Board failed to fulfil a request to postpone a round of club matches in advance of a crucial league game against Antrim. The management team returned to their positions before the start of the Leinster Championship, however, Meath suffered a 0-17 to 2-10 defeat by Carlow. On 17 September 2003, Duignan stepped down as Meath manager.

=== Offaly ===
In May 2004, Duignan accepted an invitation from team manager, Mike McNamara, to help out with the coaching of the Offaly senior team in advance of the Leinster Championship. The team secured back-to-back victories before suffering a 2-12 to 1-11 defeat by Wexford in the Leinster final. Duignan's side eventually exited the championship with All-Ireland Qualifier defeat by Clare.

== Administrative career ==
In October 2019, it was confirmed that Duignan intended to run for the position of chairman of the Offaly County Board, after expressing strong criticism of the Executive over a number of years. On 10 December 2019, he was elected to the position of chairman, having defeated incumbent Tommy Byrne by 76 votes to 62; he served a five-year term.

== Personal life ==
His son Brian went on to play for Offaly.

== Career statistics ==
Team	Year	National League			Leinster		All-Ireland		Total	
Team	Year	Division	Apps	Score	Apps	Score	Apps	Score	Apps	Score
Offaly	1987-88	Division 2	9	1-03	2	0-02	1	0-01	12	1-06
Offaly	1988-89	Division 1	6	1-02	2	2-01	1	0-00	9	3-03
Offaly	1989-90	Division 2	5	1-04	2	0-04	1	0-01	8	1-09
Offaly	1990-91	Division 2	8	3-14	1	0-00	—		9	3-14
Offaly	1991-92	Division 1A	4	2-02	1	0-00	—		5	2-02
Offaly	1992-93	Division 1A	2	0-01	1	0-00	—		3	0-01
Offaly	1993-94	Division 2	4	0-02	2	0-03	2	0-02	8	0-07
Offaly	1994-95	Division 2	8	0-02	2	0-05	2	2-01	12	2-08
Offaly	1995-96	Division 1	5	0-03	3	1-01	—		8	1-04
Offaly	1997	Division 1	5	2-01	3	0-04	—		8	2-05
Offaly	1998	Division 1A	4	2-05	3	0-04	5	1-04	12	3-13
Offaly	1999	Division 1A	4	1-04	2	1-01	2	0-02	8	2-07
Offaly	2000	Division 1A	5	1-04	2	0-01	3	0-00	10	1-05
Offaly	2001	Division 1A	2	1-00	—		—		2	1-00
Total			71	15-47	26	4-26	17	3-11	114	22-84

== Honours ==
=== Player ===
St Rynagh's

- Leinster Senior Club Hurling Championship (1) 1993
- Offaly Senior Hurling Championship (4) 1987, 1990, 1992, 1993
- Offaly Intermediate Football Championship (1) 1997

Ballinamere

- Offaly Junior A Hurling Championship (1): 2010

Offaly

- All-Ireland Senior Hurling Championship (2): 1994, 1998
- Leinster Senior Hurling Championship (5): 1988, 1989, 1990, 1994, 1995
- National Hurling League (1): 1990-91
- Walsh Cup (2): 1990, 1993
- Leinster Under-21 Hurling Championship (1): 1989
- All-Ireland Minor Hurling Championship (1): 1986
- Leinster Minor Hurling Championship (1): 1986

Awards

- GAA All-Star Award (1) 1998
- Offaly Junior Club Hurler of the Year (1): 2010

=== Management ===
Ballinamere/Durrow

- Offaly Minor A Huring Championship (2): 2016, 2017

Sporting positions
Preceded by John Davis	Meath Senior Hurling Team Manager; 2001-2003	Succeeded by John Hunt
Preceded by Tommy Byrne	Chairman of the Offaly County Board; 2019-	Succeeded by Incumbent
