= John Power (John Locke's hurler) =

Irish hurler

Personal information
- Native name: Seán de Paor (Irish)
- Nickname: The Red Lad
- Born: 17 February 1966 (age 60) Callan, County Kilkenny, Ireland
- Occupation: Farmer
- Height: 6 ft 1 in (185 cm)

Sport
- Sport: Hurling
- Position: Forward
Club
- Years: Club
- John Locke's
Club titles
- Kilkenny titles: 0
Inter-county
Years	County	Apps (scores)
1986-2002	Kilkenny	37 (4-24)
Inter-county titles
- Leinster titles: 8
- All-Irelands: 4
- NHL: 3
- All Stars: 2

John Fintan Power (born 17 February 1966) is an Irish former hurler. At club level, he played with John Locke's and was a member of the Kilkenny senior hurling team. He usually lined out as a forward.

== Career ==
Power first came to prominence at juvenile and underage levels with John Locke's while simultaneously lining out with the Callan CBS team that lost consecutive All-Ireland finals in 1982 and 1983.

Power enjoyed his first success at the adult club level in 1993 when John Locke's won the County Intermediate Championship, before claiming a second title in 1999. Power first appeared on the inter-county scene with the Kilkenny minor team that lost the All-Ireland minor final to Limerick in 1984, before losing the All-Ireland under-21 final to Tipperary the following year.

Power joined the Kilkenny senior hurling team during the 1985-86 league, however, a hand injury resulted in him leaving the team, linking up with the Kilkenny junior team and winning an All-Ireland Junior Championship medal in 1986.

He re-joined the senior team shortly after and would go on to line out in three consecutive All-Ireland finals at senior level and, after defeat by Tipperary in 1991, claimed consecutive winners' medals against Cork in 1992 and Galway in 1993.

Power was later dropped from the team before earning a recall under new manager Brian Cody in 1999. He claimed two more All-Ireland winners' medals against Offaly in 2000 and Clare in 2002.

Power's other honours include three National League titles, eight Leinster Championship medals and two Railway Cup medals with Leinster. He retired from inter-county hurling in September 2002.

== Honours ==
John Locke's

- Kilkenny Intermediate Hurling Championship: 1993, 1999

Kilkenny

- All-Ireland Senior Hurling Championship: 1992, 1993, 2000, 2002
- Leinster Senior Hurling Championship: 1987, 1991, 1992, 1993, 1999, 2000, 2001, 2002
- National Hurling League: 1989-90, 1994-95, 2002
- Leinster Under-21 Hurling Championship: 1985
- Leinster Minor Hurling Championship: 1984

Leinster

- Railway Cup: 1988, 1993

=== Individual ===
Awards

- Kilkenny Hurling Team of the Century: Centre-forward
- All-Star Awards: 1992, 1993
