= 1989 Tipperary Senior Hurling Championship =

Annual hurling competition season

- Dates: 17 September - 22 October 1989
- Teams: 8
- Champions: Clonoulty-Rossmore (2nd title); T. J. Ryan (captain); Len Gaynor (manager)
- Runners-up: Holycross-Ballycahill; Ruairí Dwan (captain); Paddy Kenny (manager)

Tournament statistics
- Matches played: 7
- Goals scored: 20 (2.86 per match)
- Points scored: 153 (21.86 per match)
- Top scorer(s): Kevin Hough (1-15)

The 1989 Tipperary Senior Hurling Championship was the 98th staging of the Tipperary Senior Hurling Championship since its establishment by the Tipperary County Board in 1887. The championship ran from 17 September to 22 October 1989.

Loughmore-Castleiney entered the championship as the defending champions, however, they were beaten by Clonoulty-Rossmore in the quarter-finals.

The final was played on 22 October 1989 at Semple Stadium in Thurles, between Clonoulty-Rossmore and Holycross-Ballycahill, in what was their first ever meeting in the final. Clonoulty-Rossmore won the match by 1–11 to 1–09 to claim their second championship title overall and a first title in 101 years.

Lorrha's Kevin Hough was the championship's top scorer with 1–15.

== Qualification ==
Division	Championship	Champions	Runners-up
Mid	Mid Tipperary Senior Hurling Championship	Holycross-Ballycahill	Loughmore-Castleiney
North	North Tipperary Senior Hurling Championship	Lorra	Toomevara
South	South Tipperary Senior Hurling Championship	Killenaule	Carrick Swans
West	West Tipperary Senior Hurling Championship	Clonoulty-Rossmore	Cappawhite

== Results ==
=== Quarter-finals ===
17 September 1989 Quarter-final	Toomevara	3-18 - 2-11	Killenaule	Boherlahan Grounds
	Nolan 0-13, J Ryan 1-1, K Kennedy 1-0, K McDonnell 1-0, G Frend 0-1, P King 0-1, N McDonnell 0-1, L Flaherty 0-1.		D O'Connell 1-2, M Shanahan 1-1, S Ryan 0-3, M Hassett 0-2, N Bergin 0-2, J O'Dwyer 0-1.	Referee: J Maher (Boherlahan)

17 September 1989 Quarter-final	Lorrha	4-14 - 2-07	Carrick Swans	Boherlahan Grounds
	K Hough 1-10, G Sullivan 2-1, P Kennedy 1-1, M Young 0-1, A McIntyre 0-1.		S Cronin 1-2, T Fitzpatrick 1-0, M Whelan 0-3, J Waters 0-1, M Grace 0-1.	Referee: G Ryan (Lattin)

24 September 1989 Quarter-final	Clonoulty-Rossmore	1-14 - 2-07	Loughmore-Castleiney	Semple Stadium
	K Ryan 0-6, J Hayes 0-4, P Hayes 1-0, M Heffernan 0-2, D Quirke 0-1, N Keane 0-1.		J Cormack 1-0, J Treacy 1-0, P McGrath 0-3, T McGrath 0-3, N Ryan 0-1.	Referee: G Long (Knockshegowna)

24 September 1989 Quarter-final	Holycross-Ballycahill	1-13 - 1-09	Cappawhite	Semple Stadium
	S Dwan 0-4, T Lanigan 0-4, R Stakelum 1-0, D Carr 0-2, P Slattery 0-1, J Doyle 0-1, M Doyle 0-1.		P O'Neill 0-6, F Quinn 1-0, C Ryan (H) 0-2, A Buckley 0-1.	Referee: J McDonnell (Roscrea)

=== Semi-finals ===
8 October 1989 Semi-final	Holycross-Ballycahill	0-12 - 0-11	Lorrha	Semple Stadium
	T Lanigan 0-5, S Dwan 0-3, D Carr 0-3, P Lowry 0-1.		K Hough 0-5, P Kennedy 0-3, M Young 0-1, W Fogarty 0-1, K Hogan 0-1.	Referee: G Ryan (Lattin)

8 October 1989 Semi-final	Clonoulty-Rossmore	2-12 - 0-05	Toomevara	Semple Stadium
	T Kennedy 1-3, K Ryan 0-5, D Ryan 1-0, J Hayes 0-2, D Quirke 0-2.		M Nolan 0-4, J Dunne 0-1.	Referee: W Barrett (Ardfinnan)

=== Final ===
22 October 1989 Final	Clonoulty-Rossmore	1-11 - 1-09	Holycross-Ballycahill	Semple Stadium
	K Ryan 0-4, P Hayes 1-0, D Ryan 0-2, D Quirke 0-2, M Heffernan 0-1, J Hayes 0-1, J Kennedy 0-1.		S Dwan 0-4, D Ryan 1-0, D Carr 0-3, J Ryan 0-1, M Doyle 0-1.	Referee: J Moloney (Galtee Rovers)

== Championship statistics ==
=== Top scorers ===
Top scorer overall

Rank	Player	Club	Tally	Total	Matches	Average
1	Kevin Hough	Lorrha	1-15	18	2	9.00
2	Mike Nolan	Toomevara	0-17	17	2	8.50
3	Kevin Ryan	Clonoulty-Rossmore	0-15	15	3	5.00
4	Stephen Dwan	Holycross-Ballycahill	0-11	11	3	3.66
5	Tony Lanigan	Holycross-Ballycahill	0-09	9	3	3.00
6	Declan Carr	Holycross-Ballycahill	0-08	8	3	2.66
7	Gerry Sullivan	Lorrha	2-01	7	2	3.50
7	Pat Kennedy	Lorrha	1-04	7	2	3.50
7	Joe Hayes	Clonoulty-Rossmore	0-07	7	3	2.33
10	Peter Hayes	Clonoulty-Rossmore	2-00	6	3	2.00
10	Tommy Kennedy	Clonoulty-Rossmore	1-03	6	3	2.00
10	Pat O'Neill	Cappawhite	0-06	6	1	6.00

Top scorers in a single game

Rank	Player	Club	Tally	Total	Opposition
1	Kevin Hough	Lorrha	1-10	13	Carrick Swans
1	Mike Nolan	Toomevara	0-13	13	Killenaule
3	Gerry Sullivan	Lorrha	2-01	7	Carrick Swans
4	Tommy Kennedy	Clonoulty-Rossmore	1-03	6	Toomevara
4	Kevin Ryan	Clonoulty-Rossmore	0-06	6	Loughmore-Castleiney
4	Pat O'Neill	Cappawhite	0-06	6	Holycross-Ballycahill
7	Donie O'Connell	Killenaule	1-02	5	Toomevara
7	Seán Cronin	Carrick Swans	1-02	5	Lorrha
7	Tony Lanigan	Holycross-Ballycahill	1-02	5	Lorrha
7	Kevin Hough	Lorrha	0-05	5	Holycross-Ballycahill
7	Kevin Ryan	Clonoulty-Rossmore	0-05	5	Toomevara

=== Miscellaneous ===
- Clonoulty-Rossmore won the title for the first time since 1888. The gap of 101 years was the longest between titles.
