= Declan Carr =

Irish hurler (born 1965)

Personal information
- Native name: Déaglán Ó Carra (Irish)
- Born: 30 July 1965 (age 61) Dublin, Ireland
- Occupation: Business director
- Height: 6 ft 1 in (185 cm)

Sport
- Sport: Hurling
- Position: Midfield
Club
- Years: Club
- Holycross–Ballycahill
Club titles
- Tipperary titles: 1
Inter-county
Years	County	Apps (scores)
1988-1999	Tipperary	16 (1-07)
Inter-county titles
- Munster titles: 3
- All-Irelands: 2
- NHL: 1
- All Stars: 1

Declan Carr (born 30 July 1965) is an Irish hurling manager and former player. At club level he played with Holycross–Ballycahill and at inter-county level was a member of the Tipperary senior hurling team. Carr captained Tipperary to the All-Ireland SHC title in 1991.

== Early life ==
Born and raised in Dublin, Carr was educated at the King's Hospital where his Tipperary-born father worked as a groundsman. The family moved to Holycross, County Tipperary in 1980. Carr finished his education at Thurles CBS where he captained the school's Dr Harty Cup team. His brother, Tommy, played Gaelic football with Dublin and later managed the team.

== Club career ==
Carr began his career at juvenile and underage levels as a dual player with the Holycross–Ballycahill club before eventually progressing to adult level. He won six Mid Tipperary SHC medals between 1985 and 1999. Carr was team captain of the team in 1990 when Holycross–Ballycahill beat Cashel King Cormacs by 0-13 to 0-10 to claim the Tipperary SHC title.

== Inter-county career ==
Carr began his inter-county career with Tipperary when he joined the under-21 team in 1985. He was an unused substitute that year when Tipperary beat Clare by 1-16 to 4-05 to win the Munster U21HC title. Carr was again an unused substitute when Tipperary beat Kilkenny by 1-10 to 2-06 in the 1985 All-Ireland under-21 final.

After a number of years out of inter-county activity, Carr joined the senior team during the 1988–89 National Hurling League. He won his first Munster SHC medal as an unused substitute that season after a 0-26 to 2-08 defeat of Waterford in the final. Carr later won his first All-Ireland SHC medal after lining out at midfield in the 4-24 to 3-09 defeat of Antrim in the 1989 All-Ireland final. He ended the season with an All-Star award.

After surrendering their titles in 1990, Carr took over the team captaincy the following year and won a second Munster SHC medal in three seasons after a 4-19 to 4-15 defeat of Cork. He later lead Tipperary to second All-Ireland SHC title in three years after the 1-16 to 0-15 defeat of Kilkenny in the 1991 All-Ireland final. Carr emigrated to the United States the following year but returned to win a third and final Munster SHC medal in 1993 before leaving the panel once again. He was recalled to the team in October 1998. Carr ended his career by winning a National Hurling League medal in 1999, following a 1-14 to 1-10 defeat of Galway in the final.

== Inter-provincial career ==
Carr's performances at inter-county level resulted in his selection for the Munster inter-provincial team. He spent three consecutive seasons with the team and won a Railway Cup medal in 1992 after the 3-12 to 1-08 defeat of Ulster.

== Management career ==
Carr first became involved in team management and coaching at club level. He served as manager of the Ballingarry team, as well as becoming involved in coaching at all levels with Holycross–Ballycahill. Carr served two seasons as manager of the Tipperary under-21 team between 2007 and 2009. His first season in charge saw him guide the team to a controversial Munster U21HC title after a one-point defeat of Clare, before losing the 2008 All-Ireland under-21 final to Kilkenny.

Carr later returned to club management and, as well as his involvement with Holycross–Ballycahill, also took charge of Doon in Limerick and Rathdowney–Errill in Laois. He returned to inter-county management in January 2021 when he was appointed manager of the Tipperary ladies' football team. Carr later took charge of the Holycross–Ballycahill camogie team.

== Honours ==
=== Player ===
Holycross-Ballycahill

- Tipperary Senior Hurling Championship: 1990
- Mid Tipperary Senior Hurling Championship: 1985, 1989, 1990, 1991, 1997, 1999

Tipperary

- All-Ireland Senior Hurling Championship: 1989, 1991 (c)
- Munster Senior Hurling Championship: 1989, 1991 (c), 1993
- National Hurling League: 1999
- All-Ireland Under-21 Hurling Championship: 1985
- Munster Under-21 Hurling Championship: 1985

Munster

- Railway Cup: 1992

=== Management ===
Tipperary

- Munster Under-21 Hurling Championship: 2008

Sporting positions
Preceded by Declan Ryan	Tipperary senior hurling team captain 1991	Succeeded by Colm Bonnar
Preceded by Tom Fogarty	Tipperary Under-21 hurling team manager 2007-2009	Succeeded by Ken Hogan
Achievements
Preceded by Tomás Mulcahy (Cork)	All-Ireland Senior Hurling Final winning captain 1991	Succeeded by Liam Fennelly (Kilkenny)
