= 1990 Tipperary Senior Hurling Championship =

Annual hurling competition season

- Dates: 15 September – 14 October 1990
- Teams: 8
- Champions: Holycross-Ballycahill (4th title); Declan Carr (captain); Paddy Kenny (manager)
- Runners-up: Cashel King Cormacs; Cormac Bonnar (captain); Justin McCarthy (manager)

Tournament statistics
- Matches played: 8
- Goals scored: 17 (2.13 per match)
- Points scored: 179 (22.38 per match)
- Top scorer(s): Stephen Dwan (2-20)

The 1990 Tipperary Senior Hurling Championship was the 99th staging of the Tipperary Senior Hurling Championship since its establishment by the Tipperary County Board in 1887. The championship began on 15 September 1990 and ended on 14 October 1990.

Clonoulty-Rossmore were the defending champions, however, they were defeated by Kilruane MacDomaghs at the quarter-final stage.

On 14 October 1990, Holycross-Ballycahill won the title after a 0–13 to 0–10 defeat of Cashel King Cormacs in the final at Semple Stadium. It was their fourth championship title overall and their first title since 1954. It remains their last championship title.

Holycross-Ballycahill's Stephen Dwan was the championship's top scorer with 2-20.

== Participating teams ==
Championship	Champions	Runners-up
Mid Tipperary Senior Hurling Championship	Holycross-Ballycahill	Loughmore-Castleiney
North Tipperary Senior Hurling Championship	Kilruane MacDonaghs	Toomevara
South Tipperary Senior Hurling Championship	Carrick Swans	Killenaule
West Tipperary Senior Hurling Championship	Cashel King Cormacs	Clonoulty-Rossmore

== Results ==
=== Quarter-finals ===
15 September 1990 Quarter-final	Loughmore-Castleiney	0-17 - 1-08	Carrick Swans	Leahy Park, Cashel
	T McGrath 0-10, P McGrath 0-5, S Bohan 0-1, J Treacy 0-1.		S Cronin 0-5, T Waters 1-0, K O'Shea 0-1, MJ Russell 0-1, T Fitzpatrick 0-1.	Referee: J McDonnell (Roscrea)

16 September 1990 Quarter-final	Cashel King Cormacs	0-16 - 1-09	Toomevara	Semple Stadium, Thurles
	T Grogan 0-11, R Ryan 0-2, W Fitzelle 0-2, Cormac Bonnar 0-1.		M Nolan 0-4, T Carroll 1-0, M O'Meara 0-2, K McDonnell 0-2, P King 0-1.	Referee: P Cahill (Holycross-Ballycahill)

16 September 1990 Quarter-final	Kilruane MacDonaghs	3-08 - 0-09	Clonoulty-Rossmore	Semple Stadium, Thurles
	S Williams 1-1, G Williams 0-4, P Quinlan 1-0, E O'Shea 1-0, D Quinlan 0-1, J Banahan 0-1, J Cahill 0-1.		D Quirke 0-3, J Hayes 0-2, D Ryan 0-2, D Ryan 0-1, M Heffernan 0-1.	Referee: W Barrett (Ardfinnan)

16 September 1990 Quarter-final	Holycross-Ballycahill	4-17 - 3-09	Killenaule	Leahy Park, Cashel
	S Dwan 2-5, D Carr 1-7, P Slattery 1-2, P Dwan 0-2, T Lanigan 0-1.		C Devitt 2-0, J O'Dwyer 1-2, T Shelly 0-5, N Bergin 0-1, M Hassett 0-1.	Referee: P Lonergan (Galtee Rovers)

=== Semi-finals ===
23 September 1990 Semi-final	Cashel King Cormacs	1-08 - 0-08	Loughmore-Castleiney	Semple Stadium, Thurles
	T Grogan 0-5, J Grogan 1-0, A Bonnar 0-2, C Bonnar 0-1.		P McGrath 0-3, J McCormack 0-3, P Lynch 0-1, J Treacy 0-1,	Referee: W Barrett (Ardfinnan)

23 September 1990 Semi-final	Holycross-Ballycahill	0-12 - 1-09	Kilruane MacDonaghs	Semple Stadium, Thurles
	D Carr 0-5, S Dwan 0-2, T Lanigan 0-1, P Dwan 0-1, PJ Lanigan 0-1, P Slattery 0-1, R Stakelum 0-1.		G Williams 0-6, P Quinlan 1-0, D Quinlan 0-2, T Killackey 0-1.	Referee: J Moloney (Galtee Rovers)

23 September 1990 Semi-final replay	Holycross-Ballycahill	1-16 - 2-10	Kilruane MacDonaghs	Semple Stadium, Thurles
	S Dwan 0-9, M Doyle 1-1, T Lanigan 0-4, D Carr 0-2.		G Williams 0-6, Philip Quinlan 1-1, D Cahill 1-0, M Tooher 0-2, J Banahan 0-1.	Referee: J Moloney (Galtee Rovers)

=== Final ===
14 October 1990 Final	Holycross-Ballycahill	0-13 - 0-10	Cashel King Cormacs	Semple Stadium, Thurles
	S Dwan 0-4, T Lannigan 0-4, P Dwan 0-2, P Maher 0-1, P Slattery 0-1, D Carr 0-1.		T Grogan 0-6, Colm Bonnar 0-2, Cormac Bonnar 0-1, E Bonnar 0-1.	Referee: W Barrett (Ardfinnan)

== Championship statistics ==
=== Top scorers ===
Top scorer overall

Rank	Player	Club	Tally	Total	Matches	Average
1	Stephen Dwan	Holycross-Ballycahill	2-20	26	4	6.50
2	Tommy Grogan	Cashel King Cormacs	0-22	22	3	7.33
3	Declan Carr	Holycross-Ballycahill	1-15	18	4	4.50
4	Ger Williams	Kilruane MacDonaghs	0-16	16	3	5.33
5	Philip Quinlan	Kilruane MacDonaghs	3-01	10	3	3.33
5	Tom McGrath	Loughmore-Castleiney	0-10	10	3	3.33
5	Tony Lanigan	Holycross-Ballycahill	0-10	10	4	2.50
8	Pat McGrath	Loughmore-Castleiney	0-08	8	2	4.00
9	Paul Slattery	Holycross-Ballycahill	1-04	7	4	1.75
10	Christy Devitt	Killenaule	2-00	6	1	6.00

Top scorers in a single game

Rank	Player	Club	Tally	Total	Opposition
1	Stephen Dwan	Holycross-Ballycahill	2-05	11	Killenaule
1	Tommy Grogan	Cashel King Cormacs	0-11	11	Toomevara
3	Declan Carr	Holycross-Ballycahill	1-07	10	Killenaule
3	Tom McGrath	Loughmore-Castleiney	0-10	10	Carrick Swans
5	Stephen Dwan	Holycross-Ballycahill	0-09	9	Kilruane MacDonaghs
6	Christy Devitt	Killenaule	2-00	6	Holycross-Ballycahill
6	Ger Williams	Kilruane MacDonaghs	0-06	6	Holycross-Ballycahill
6	Ger Williams	Kilruane MacDonaghs	0-06	6	Holycross-Ballycahill
6	Tommy Grogan	Cashel King Cormacs	0-06	6	Holycross-Ballycahill
10	Paul Slattery	Holycross-Ballycahill	1-02	5	Killenaule
10	John O'Dwyer	Killenaule	1-02	5	Holycross-Ballycahill
10	Tony Shelly	Killenaule	0-05	5	Holycross-Ballycahill
10	Pat McGrath	Loughmore-Castleiney	0-05	5	Carrick Swans
10	Seán Cronin	Carrick Swans	0-05	5	Loughmore-Castleiney
10	Tommy Grogan	Cashel King Cormacs	0-05	5	Loughmore-Castleiney
10	Declan Carr	Holycross-Ballycahill	0-05	5	Kilruane MacDonaghs
