= Dan Quirke =

Irish Gaelic footballer and hurler

Personal information
- Native name: Dónall Ó Coirc (Irish)
- Born: 1968 (age 57–58) Rossmore, County Tipperary, Ireland
- Occupation: Restaurant owner

Sport
- Sport: Gaelic football
- Position: Left wing-forward
Club
- Years: Club
- Clonoulty–Rossmore
Club titles
	Football	Hurling
Tipperary titles	0	1
Inter-county
- Years: County
- 1991-1993: Tipperary
Inter-county titles
- Munster titles: 0
- All-Irelands: 0
- NFL: 0
- All Stars: 0

Daniel Quirke (born 1968) is an Irish former Gaelic footballer and hurler who played for club side Clonoulty–Rossmore and at inter-county level with the Tipperary senior football team.

== Career ==
Quirke first played Gaelic football and hurling at juvenile and underage levels with Clonoulty–Rossmore. He won a total of six divisional minor and under-21 titles between 1982 and 1988 as well as an All-Ireland Colleges BHC title with Cashel CBS in 1982. He was still a minor when Clonoulty won the Tipperary JAFC title in 1985 before securing the Tipperary IFC title the following year.

At inter-county level, Quirke spent two seasons as a dual player at minor level in 1985 and 1986 before progressing onto the under-21 teams. He scored 3-02 when Tipperary beat Offaly by two points in the 1989 All-Ireland U21HC final. Later that season he was a part of the Clonoulty team that won a first Tipperary SHC title in over 100 years after a defeat of Holycross-Ballycahill in the final.

Quirke made a number of appearances with the Tipperary senior football team between 1991 and 1993. His club career came to an end after winning a second Tipperary JAFC title with Clonoulty-Rossmore in 2000.

== Personal life ==
Quirke's son, Dillon, also played for Clonoulty–Rossmore and Tipperary.

== Honours ==
Cashel CBS

- All-Ireland Colleges B Hurling Championship: 1982

Clonoulty–Rossmore

- Tipperary Senior Hurling Championship: 1989
- West Tipperary Senior Hurling Championship: 1989
- Tipperary Intermediate Football Championship: 1986
- West Tipperary Intermediate Football Championship: 1986, 1991
- Tipperary Junior A Football Championship: 1985, 2000
- West Tipperary Junior A Football Championship: 1985, 1994, 1996, 2000

Tipperary

- All-Ireland Under-21 Hurling Championship: 1989
- Munster Under-21 Hurling Championship: 1989
