= 1987 Tipperary Senior Hurling Championship =

Annual hurling competition season

- Dates: 27 September – 1 November 1987
- Teams: 8
- Champions: Cappawhite (1st title); John O'Neill (captain); Rusty Keane (manager)
- Runners-up: Loughmore-Castleiney; John Cormack (captain); Paddy Kenny (manager)

Tournament statistics
- Matches played: 8
- Goals scored: 22 (2.75 per match)
- Points scored: 196 (24.5 per match)
- Top scorer(s): Pat O'Neill (1-28)

The 1987 Tipperary Senior Hurling Championship was the 96th staging of the Tipperary Senior Hurling Championship since its establishment by the Tipperary County Board in 1887. The championship began on 27 September 1987 and ended on 1 November 1987.

Borris-Ileigh were the defending champions, however, they failed to qualify after being defeated by Lorrha in the North Tipperary Championship.

On 1 November 1987, Cappawhite won the championship after a 1–17 to 2–13 defeat of Loughmore-Castleiney in the final at Semple Stadium. It remains their only championship title.

== Qualification ==
Division	Championship	Champions	Runners-up
Mid	Mid Tipperary Senior Hurling Championship	Holycross-Ballycahill	Loughmore-Castleiney
North	North Tipperary Senior Hurling Championship	Kilruane MacDonaghs	Lorrha
South	South Tipperary Senior Hurling Championship	Ballingarry	Killenaule
West	West Tipperary Senior Hurling Championship	Cappawhite	Clonoulty-Rossmore

== Results ==
=== Quarter-finals ===
27 September 1987 Quarter-final	Loughmore-Castleiney	2-13 - 3-06	Killenaule	Leahy Park
	N Ryan 1-1, T McGrath 0-4, P McGrath 0-4, McGrath 0-3, M Maher 1-0, T Larkin 0-1.		J Lyons 1-1, D Gettigan 0-4, A O'Dwyer 1-0, M Brennan 1-0, M Shanahan 0-1.

27 September 1987 Quarter-final	Thurles Sarsfields	4-12 - 1-08	Ballingarry	Leahy Park
	L Duggan 2-1, A Ryan 2-0, C Maher 0-6, E Walsh 0-4, J Kennedy 0-1.		M Lyons 1-3, K Shelly 0-3, M Shelly 0-1, S Tuohy 0-1.

27 September 1987 Quarter-final	Kilruane MacDonaghs	0-15 - 2-09	Clonoulty-Rossmore	St. Michael's Park
	S Hennessy 0-6, E O'Shea 0-4, P Williams 0-3, J Williams 0-1, P Quinlan 0-1.		P Hayes 1-3, D Ryan 1-1, T Kennedy 0-3, C Ryan 0-1, TJ Ryan 0-1.

4 October 1987 Quarter-final	Cappawhite	1-20 - 1-14	Roscrea	Boherlahan Grounds
	P O'Neill 0-10, M McDermott 0-4, A Buckley 0-4, G O'Neill 1-0, J O'Neill 0-1, E Ryan 0-1.		M Scully 0-6, P Hogan 1-1, J Treacy 0-2, L Spooner 0-2, F Fletcher 0-2, J Stone 0-1.

4 October 1987 Quarter-final replay	Kilruane MacDonaghs	1-18 - 0-09	Clonoulty-Rossmore	Boherlahan Grounds
	S Hennessy 0-8, Philip Quinlan 1-3, E O'Shea 0-4, Pat Quinlan 0-2, P Williams 0-1.		D Ryan 0-4, T Kennedy 0-2, P Hayes 0-1, D Quirke 0-1, A O'Dwyer 0-1.

=== Semi-finals ===
18 October 1987 Semi-final	Loughmore-Castleiney	1-12 - 0-12	Kilruane MacDonaghs	Semple Stadium
	P McGrath 0-5, M McGrath 1-1, L Cormack 0-2, T McGrath 0-2, P Treacy 0-1, E Brennan 0-1.		S Hennessy 0-5, J Williams 0-2, P Williams 0-2, E O'Shea 0-1, P Quinlan 0-1, D Cahill 0-1.

18 October 1987 Semi-final	Cappawhite	2-15 - 1-14	Thurles Sarsfields	Semple Stadium
	P O'Neill 1-8, A Buckley 0-4, J O'Neill 1-0, D Hennessy 0-1, E Ryan 0-1, M McDermott 0-1.		C Maher 0-5, L Duggan 1-1, E Walsh 0-3, J Kennedy 0-2, P Maher 0-2, C Carroll 0-1.

=== Final ===
1 November 1987 Final	Cappawhite	1-17 - 2-13	Loughmore-Castleiney	Semple Stadium
	P O'Neill 0-10, M McDermott 1-1, G O'Neill 0-3, A Buckley 0-2, A O'Neill 0-1.		P McGrath 1-8, L Cormack 1-2, T McGrath 0-2, N Ryan 0-1.	Referee: G Long (Knockshegowna)

== Championship statistics ==
=== Top scorers ===
Top scorers overall

Rank	Player	Club	Tally	Total	Matches	Average
1	Pat O'Neill	Cappawhite	1-28	31	3	10.33
2	Pat McGrath	Loughmore-Castleiney	1-17	20	3	6.66
3	Séamus Hennessy	Kilruane MacDonaghs	0-19	19	3	6.33
4	Liam Duggan	Thurles Sarsfields	3-02	11	2	5.50
4	Connie Maher	Thurles Sarsfields	0-11	11	2	5.50
6	Austin Buckley	Cappawhite	0-10	10	3	3.33
7	Martin McDermott	Cappawhite	1-06	9	3	3.00
7	Eamon O'Shea	Kilruane MacDonaghs	0-09	9	3	3.00
9	Declan Ryan	Clonoulty-Rossmore	1-05	8	2	4.00
9	Tom McGrath	Loughmore-Castleiney	0-08	8	3	2.66

Top scorers in a single game

Rank	Player	Club	Tally	Total	Opposition
1	Pat O'Neill	Cappawhite	1-08	11	Thurles Sarsfields
1	Pat McGrath	Loughmore-Castleiney	1-08	11	Cappawhite
3	Pat O'Neill	Cappawhite	0-10	10	Roscrea
3	Pat O'Neill	Cappawhite	0-10	10	Loughmore-Castleiney
5	Séamus Hennessy	Kilruane MacDonaghs	0-08	8	Clonoulty-Rossmore
6	Liam Duggan	Thurles Sarsfields	2-01	7	Ballingarry
7	Andy Ryan	Thurles Sarsfields	2-00	6	Ballingarry
7	Michael Lyons	Ballingarry	1-03	6	Thurles Sarsfields
7	Peter Hayes	Clonoulty-Rossmore	1-03	6	Kilruane MacDonaghs
7	Philip Quinlan	Kilruane MacDonaghs	1-03	6	Clonoulty-Rossmore
7	Connie Maher	Thurles Sarsfields	0-06	6	Ballingarry
7	Séamus Hennessy	Kilruane MacDonaghs	0-06	6	Clonoulty-Rossmore
7	Michael Scully	Roscrea	0-06	6	Cappawhite
