= 1988 Tipperary Senior Hurling Championship =

Annual hurling competition season

- Dates: 14 August – 8 October 1988
- Teams: 8
- Champions: Loughmore-Castleiney (1st title); Eamon Sweeney (captain); Jack Walshe (manager)
- Runners-up: Borris-Ileigh; Bobby Ryan (captain); Paddy Doyle (manager)

Tournament statistics
- Matches played: 8
- Goals scored: 31 (3.88 per match)
- Points scored: 142 (17.75 per match)
- Top scorer(s): Noel O'Dwyer (1-17)

The 1988 Tipperary Senior Hurling Championship was the 97th staging of the Tipperary Senior Hurling Championship since its establishment by the Tipperary County Board in 1887. The championship began on 14 August 1988 and ended on 8 October 1988.

Cappawhite were the defending champions, however, they failed to qualify after being defeated in the West Tipperary Championship.

On 8 October 1988, Loughmore-Castleiney won the championship after a 2–07 to 1–08 defeat of Borris-Ileigh in a final replay at Semple Stadium. It was their first ever championship title.

== Qualification ==
Division	Championship	Champions	Runners-up
Mid	Mid Tipperary Senior Hurling Championship	Loughmore-Castleiney	Holycross-Ballycahill
North	North Tipperary Senior Hurling Championship	Borris-Ileigh	Roscrea
South	South Tipperary Senior Hurling Championship	Killenaule	St. Mary's
West	West Tipperary Senior Hurling Championship	Cashel King Cormacs	Kickhams

== Results ==
=== Quarter-finals ===
14 August 1988 Quarter-final	Borris-Ileigh	1-09 - 1-08	Holycross-Ballycahill	Páirc Shíleáin
	N O'Dwyer 1-6, A Ryan 0-2, C Stakelum 0-1.		M Fleming 1-0, S Dwan 0-3, R Stakelum 0-2, T Lanigan 0-2, M Doyle 0-1.

14 August 1988 Quarter-final	Killenaule	5-14 - 4-06	Kickhams	Boherlahan Grounds
	J O'Dwyer 2-5, M Shanahan 1-3, J Lyons 0-5, N Bergin 1-0, D Hearne 1-0, D O'Connell 0-1.		D Keating 2-1, L Farrell 1-0, J O'Dwyer 1-0, W Carroll 0-2, M McGrath 0-2, S Alley 0-1.

14 August 1988 Quarter-final	Cashel King Cormacs	3-11 - 2-06	St. Mary's	Boherlahan Grounds
	M Perdue 1-2, S Slattery 1-2, J Ryan 1-1, Conal Bonnar 0-2, Colm Bonnar 0-1, P Fitzelle 0-1, B Fitzelle 0-1, J Ryan 0-1.		T Smith 2-0, G Deely 0-4, A Wall 0-1, M Peters 0-1.

11 September 1988 Quarter-final	Loughmore-Castleiney	3-08 - 0-09	Nenagh Éire Óg	Páirc Shíleáin
	P McGratg 1-1, J Treacy 1-1, S Bohan 1-1, T McGrath 0-2, M McGrath 0-2, J Cormack 0-1.		M Cleary 0-3, P Kennedy 0-2, D Finnerty 0-1, M Kennedy 0-1, P Hennessy 0-1, N Coffey 0-1.

=== Semi-finals ===
17 September 1988 Semi-final	Loughmore-Castleiney	2-18 - 1-09	Killenaule	Leahy Park
	P McGrath 0-5, T Larkin 1-1, J Cormack 0-4, S Bohan 1-0, T McGrath 0-3, M McGrath 0-3, L Cormack 0-1, P Treacy 0-1.		J O'Dwyer 0-4, P O'Connell 1-0, M Hassett 0-2, M Gleeson 0-1, N Bergin 0-1, M Shanahan 0-1.

17 September 1988 Semi-final	Borris-Ileigh	3-08 - 2-06	Cashel King Cormacs	Semple Stadium
	A Ryan 1-2, P Kenny 1-1, S Devaney 1-0, N O'Dwyer 0-3, C Stakelum 0-2.		S Slattery 1-1, P Fitzelle 1-1, J Ryan 0-2, M Perdue 0-1, C Bonnar 0-1.	Referee: W Barrett (Ardfinnan)

=== Final ===
2 October 1988 Final	Loughmore-Castleiney	1-06 - 0-09	Borris-Ileigh	Semple Stadium
	S Bohan 1-0, P McGrath 0-3, T McGrath 0-2, M McGrath 0-1.		N O'Dwyer 0-4, A Ryan 0-2, C Stakelum 0-2, S Devaney 0-1.

8 October 1988 Final replay	Loughmore-Castleiney	2-07 - 1-08	Borris-Ileigh	Semple Stadium
	P McGrath 1-0, L Cormack 1-0, T McGrath 0-3, M McGrath 0-2, S Bohan 0-1, N Ryan 0-1.		N O'Dwyer 0-4, S Devaney 0-4, A Ryan 1-0.	Referee: W Barrett (Ardfinnan)

== Championship statistics ==
=== Top scorers ===
Top scorers overall

Rank	Player	Club	Tally	Total	Matches	Average
1	Noel O'Dwyer	Borris-Ileigh	1-17	20	4	5.00
2	Joe O'Dwyer	Killenaule	2-09	15	2	7.50
2	Pat McGrath	Loughmore-Castleiney	2-09	15	4	3.75
4	Aidan Ryan	Borris-Ileigh	2-06	12	4	3.00
5	Séamus Bohan	Loughmore-Castleiney	3-02	11	4	2.75
6	Tom McGrath	Loughmore-Castleiney	0-10	10	4	2.50
7	Seán Slattery	Cashel King Cormacs	2-03	9	2	4.50
8	Michael McGrath	Loughmore-Castleiney	0-08	8	4	2.00
9	Séamus Devaney	Borris-Ileigh	1-05	8	4	2.00
10	Dermot Keating	Kickhams	2-01	7	1	7.00
10	Martin Shanahan	Killenaule	1-04	7	2	3.50

Top scorers in a single game

Rank	Player	Club	Tally	Total	Opposition
1	Joe O'Dwyer	Killenaule	2-05	11	Kickhams
2	Noel O'Dwyer	Borris-Ileigh	1-06	9	Holycross-Ballycahill
3	Dermot Keating	Kickhams	2-01	7	Killenaule
4	Tony Smith	St. Mary's	2-00	6	Cashel King Cormacs
4	Martin Shanahan	Killenaule	1-03	6	Kickhams
6	Michael Perdue	Cashel King Cormacs	1-02	5	St. Mary's
6	Seán Slattery	Cashel King Cormacs	1-02	5	St. Mary's
6	Aidan Ryan	Borris-Ileigh	1-02	5	Cashel King Cormacs
6	John Lyons	Killenaule	0-05	5	Kickhams
6	Pat McGrath	Loughmore-Castleiney	0-05	5	Killenaule

=== Miscellaneous ===
- Loughmore-Castleiney win their first senior title.
