= 2008 All-Ireland Under-21 Hurling Championship =

All-Ireland Under-21 Hurling Championship 2008
Championship Details
- Dates: 28 May – 14 September 2008
- Teams: 16

All Ireland Champions
- Winners: Kilkenny (11th win)
- Captain: James Dowling
- Manager: Michael Walsh

All Ireland Runners-up
- Runners-up: Tipperary
- Captain: Séamus Hennessy
- Manager: Declan Carr

Provincial Champions
- Munster: Tipperary
- Leinster: Kilkenny
- Ulster: Derry
- Connacht: Not Played

Championship Statistics
- Top Scorer: Richie Hogan (3-27)

The 2008 All-Ireland Under-21 Hurling Championship was the 45th staging of the All-Ireland Under-21 Championship since its establishment by the Gaelic Athletic Association in 1964. The championship ran from 28 May to 14 September 2008.

Galway entered the championship as the defending champions, however, they were beaten by Kilkenny in the All-Ireland semi-final.

The All-Ireland final was played on 14 September 2008 at Croke Park in Dublin between Kilkenny and Tipperary in what was their ninth meeting in the final overall and a first meeting in the final in two years. Kilkenny won the match by 2-13 to 0-15 to claim their 11th championship title overall and a first title in two years. This win completed a Grand Slam of hurling titles for Kilkenny in 2008.

Kilkenny's Richie Hogan was the championship's top scorer with 3-27.

== Leinster Under-21 Hurling Championship ==
=== Leinster quarter-finals ===
28 May 2008 Quarter-final	Laois	1-12 - 0-18	Dublin	O'Moore Park
	Z Keenan 0-9, J Gaughan 1-0, D Dooley 0-1, W Hyland 0-1, D Peacock 0-1.		K O'Reilly 0-8, R O'Carroll 0-4, D O'Dwyer 0-2, J Boland 0-1, S Lambert 0-1, S Durkin 0-1, J Maher 0-1.	Referee: A Lagrue (Kildare)

28 May 2008 Quarter-final	Carlow	1-08 - 3-16	Offaly	Dr. Cullen Park
	E Minchin 1-0, C Clancy 0-3, P Walsh 0-2, J Doran 0-1, P Nolan 0-1, J Kinsella 0-1.		C Coughlan 2-8, D Currams 1-0, D Horan 0-2, J Gorman 0-2, E Kerrigan 0-2, D Molloy 0-2.	Referee: A Stapleton (Laois)

=== Leinster semi-finals ===
25 June 2008 Semi-final	Offaly	2-16 - 1-11	Wexford	St Brendan's Park
	C Coughlan (0-6), E Egan (0-4), F Kerrigan (1-0), D Currams (0-3), D Horan (0-2), D Molloy (0-1), J Bergin (0-1).		T Barron (1-4), PJ Nolan (0-2), K Burke (0-2), B O’Connor (0-1), G Wheelock (0-1), N Walsh (0-1).	Referee: D Connolly (Kilkenny)

26 June 2008 Semi-final	Dublin	1-11 - 1-20	Kilkenny	Parnell Park
	K O'Reilly 0-5, D O'Dwyer 1-0, Ross O'Carroll 0-2, P Ryan 0-2, S Durkin 0-2.		R Hogan 1-10, N Cleere 0-3, C Fennelly 0-3, P Hogan 0-1, N Walsh 0-1, J Mulhall 0-1, M Ruth 0-1.	Referee: J Owens (Wexford)

=== Leinster final ===
24 July 2008 Final	Offaly	2-09 - 2-21	Kilkenny	O'Connor Park
	J Bergin (2-1, 1-0 pen), C Coughlan (0-4, two frees), D Horan (0-2, two frees), D Molloy (0-1), D Morkan (0-1).	Report	TJ Reid (1-3), R Hogan (0-6, four frees), N Cleere (1-1), C Fennnelly (0-3), J Mulhall (0-2), P Hogan (0-2, one free), N Walsh (0-1), L Ryan (0-1), M Ruth (0-1), J Maher (0-1).	Referee: A Stapleton (Laois)

== Munster Under-21 Hurling Championship ==
=== Munster quarter-final ===
5 June 2008 Quarter-final	Waterford	1-07 - 2-17	Limerick	Walsh Park
	J Phelan 1-2, J Gorman 0-1, J Dooley 0-1, C Burke 0-1, D Twomey 0-1, S Walsh 0-1.		E Ryan 0-9, R McCarthy 1-2, G Mulcahy 1-1, D Moloney 0-3, D Hanley 0-1, B O'Sullivan 0-1.	Referee: C McAllister (Cork)

=== Munster semi-finals ===
17 July 2008 Semi-final	Tipperary	1-13 - 0-15	Limerick	Semple Stadium
	P Bourke 0-9, S Bourke 1-1, G Ryan 0-1, M O'Meara 0-1, S Hennessy 0-1.		E Ryan 0-3, G O'Mahoney 0-3, G Mulcahy 0-2, B O’Sullivan 0-2, P O'Brien 0-1, D Moloney 0-1, D Hanley 0-1, S Tobon 0-1, R McCarthy 0-1.	Referee: D Copps (Cork)

20 July 2008 Semi-final	Cork	1-11 - 1-20	Clare	Páirc Uí Chaoimh
	P Horgan 1-5, P O'Sullivan 0-3, P Cronin 0-1, S Moylan 0-1, C Naughton 0-1.		C Morey 1-8, G Arthur 0-4, J Conlon 0-2, D Browne 0-2, S Collins 0-2, C Ryan 0-1, C Tierney 0-1.	Referee: N Cosgrave (Tipperary)

=== Munster final ===
30 July 2008 Final	Clare	2-12 - 1-16	Tipperary	Cusack Park
	C Morey (1-4, 0-4 fs), C Ryan (1-0), D Browne (0-3fs, J Conlon (0-2), D Honan, N O'Connell, G Arthur (0-1) each.	Report; Full Match	S Callinan (1-5), P Bourke (0-6, 2 65s ,1f), K Lanigan, T Stapleton, S Hennessy, T McGrath, S Bourke (0-1) each.	Attendance: 11,287; Referee: J O'Mahony (Limerick)

== Ulster Under-21 Hurling Championship ==
=== Ulster group stage table ===
	Team	Pld	W	D	L	SF	SA	SD	Pts
1	Derry	3	3	0	0	5-49	2-30	28	6
2	Antrim	3	2	0	1				4
3	Down	3	1	0	2	1-34	5-42	-20	2
4	Armagh	3	0	0	3				0

=== Ulster group stage results ===
16 July 2008	Armagh	0-11 - 3-15	Derry	P. J. O'Neill Park
	C Carville (0-4), J Corvan (0-2), C McAlinden (0-1), A Curry (0-1), M Mone (0-1), T Turley (0-1), M McDermott (0-1), S McArdle (0-1).		SL McGoldrick (2-3), P McCloskey (1-4), C McKenna (0-4), M Craig (0-1), M Kirpatrick (0-1), N Holley (0-1), G Kelly (0-1).	Referee: J O'Rourke (Monaghan)

16 July 2008	Antrim	2-18 - 0-08	Down	Casement Park
	P Doherty (1-2), E McCloskey (0-5), S McNaughton (1-1), R McDonnell (0-3), C Duffin (0-3), P McGill (0-2), PJ O’Connell (0-1), S Dowds (0-1).		J Coyle (0-3), M O’Prey (0-1), R Magee (0-1), C McCarthy (0-1), P Keith (0-1), C Woods (0-1), C O’Prey (0-1).	Referee: É Hassan (Derry)

23 July 2008	Derry	0-16 - 1-11	Antrim	Celtic Park
	M Kirpatrick (0-8), R O’Kane (0-2), B Dodds (0-2), P McCloskey (0-2), SL McGoldrick (0-1), C McKenna (0-1).	Report	P Shiels (0-4), C Duffin (1-0), PJ O’Connell (0-2), P McGill (0-2), R McDonnell (0-1), E McCloskey (0-1), P Doherty (0-1).

30 July 2008	Down	1-08 - 2-18	Derry	McKenna Park
		Report

30 July 2008	Armagh	v	Antrim	Garard McGleenan Park

6 August 2008	Down	0-18 - 1-06	Armagh	McKenna Park
		Report

== All-Ireland Under-21 Hurling Championship ==
=== All-Ireland semi-finals ===
24 August 2008 Semi-final	Tipperary	1-20 - 0-10	Derry	Cusack Park
	P Burke (1-5, two frees, one 65), S Hennessy (0-4, two frees), S Bourke (0-3), J Ryan (0-2), T McGrath (0-2), S Callinan (0-1), M Cahill (0-1), G Ryan (0-1), B Maher (0-1).	Report	M Kirkpatrick (0-3, two frees), B Dodds (0-3), SL McGoldrick (0-2, one free), P Henry (0-1), G Kelly (0-1).	Referee: J McGrath (Westmeath)

24 August 2008 Semi-final	Kilkenny	2-14 - 1-13	Galway	Semple Stadium
	R Hogan (2-5, one free), C Fennelly (0-4), TJ Reid (0-3), P Hogan (0-1, free), J Mulhall (0-1).	Report	J Canning (0-8, four frees, 3 sideline), C Kavanagh (1-1), E Forde (0-2), S Glynn (0-1), J Greene (0-1).	Referee: M Wadding (Waterford)

=== All-Ireland final ===
14 September 2008 Final	Kilkenny	2-13 - 0-15	Tipperary	Croke Park
	M Ruth (2-2), R Hogan (0-6, five frees), J Mulhall (0-2), TJ Reid (0-2), N Walsh (0-1).	Report	P Bourke (0-8, seven frees, one sl), G Ryan (0-3), B Maher (0-1), S Callinan (0-1), K Lanigan (0-1), S Bourke (0-1).	Referee: J Owens (Wexford)

== Championship statistics ==
=== Top scorers ===
Rank	Player	County	Tally	Total	Matches	Average
1	Richie Hogan	Kilkenny	3-27	36	4	9.00
2	Pa Bourke	Tipperary	1-28	31	4	7.75
3	Colm Coughlan	Offaly	2-18	24	3	8.00
