= 1991 All-Ireland Junior Hurling Championship =

All Ireland Champions
- Winners: Tipperary (9th win)
- Captain: Gerry O'Brien

All Ireland Runners-up
- Runners-up: London

Provincial Champions
- Munster: Tipperary
- Leinster: Kilkenny
- Ulster: Armagh
- Connacht: Not Played

The 1991 All-Ireland Junior Hurling Championship was the 70th staging of the All-Ireland Junior Championship since its establishment by the Gaelic Athletic Association in 1912.

Kilkenny entered the championship as the defending champions.

The All-Ireland final was played on 8 September 1991 at the Gaelic Grounds in Limerick, between Tipperary and London, in what was their first meeting in a final since 1933. Tipperary won the match by 4-17 to 1-05 to claim their ninth championship title overall and a first title since 1989.

== Results ==
=== Leinster Junior Hurling Championship ===
==== Leinster quarter-finals ====
13 May 1991 Quarter-final	Carlow	2-04 - 4-15	Meath	Dr. Cullen Park

13 May 1991 Quarter-final	Laois	5-21 - 0-02	Louth	O'Moore Park

13 May 1991 Quarter-final	Wexford	1-10 - 2-07	Dublin	Páirc Uí Shíocháin

22 May 1991 Quarter-final replay	Dublin	2-14 - 2-15	Wexford	O'Toole Park

==== Leinster semi-finals ====
5 June 1991 Semi-final	Wexford	6-10 - 0-02	Laois	Bellefield Road

5 June 1991 Semi-final	Meath	0-04 - 2-17	Kilkenny	St. Loman's Park

==== Leinster final ====
16 June 1991 Final	Wexford	2-06 - 3-12	Kilkenny	Wexford Park

=== Munster Junior Hurling Championship ===
==== Munster first round ====
19 May 1991 First round	Kerry	0-05 - 2-22	Wateford	FitzGerald Stadium

19 May 1991 First round	Limerick	1-07 - 3-14	Clare	Gaelic Grounds

==== Munster semi-finals ====
2 June 1991 Semi-final	Cork	2-15 - 1-12	Waterford	Semple Stadium

9 June 1991 Semi-final	Tipperary	3-15 - 2-11	Clare	Semple Stadium

==== Munster final ====
21 June 1991 Final	Cork	5-10 - 4-13	Tipperary	Mallow GAA Grounds

==== Munster final replay ====
29 June 1991 Final	Tipperary	2-20 - 0-11	Cork	Semple Stadium

=== Ulster Junior Hurling Championship ===
==== Ulster final ====
19 May 1991 Final	Armagh	2-07 - 1-04	Fermanagh	Páirc Mhuire

=== All-Ireland Junior Hurling Championship ===
==== All-Ireland semi-finals ====
14 July 1991 Semi-final	Galway	1-10 - 3-16	Kilkenny	St. Brendan's Park

14 July 1991 Semi-final	Tipperary	3-19 - 0-04	Armagh	St. Brendan's Park

==== All-Ireland home final ====
27 July 1991 Home final	Tipperary	2-13 - 0-10	Kilkenny	Gaelic Grounds

==== All-Ireland final ====
8 September 1991 Final	Tipperary	4-17 - 1-05	London	Gaelic Grounds
