= Tony Lanigan (hurler) =

Irish hurler

Personal information
- Native name: Antaine Ó Lonagáin (Irish)
- Born: 1968 (age 57–58) Holycross, County Tipperary, Ireland

Sport
- Sport: Hurling
- Position: Left corner-forward
Club
- Years: Club
- Holycross–Ballycahill
Club titles
- Tipperary titles: 1
Inter-county
Years	County	Apps (scores)
1990-1991	Tipperary	0 (0-00)
Inter-county titles
- Munster titles: 1
- All-Irelands: 1
- NHL: 0
- All Stars: 0

Tony Lanigan (born 1968) is an Irish former hurler. At club level he played with Holycross–Ballycahill and was also a member of the Tipperary senior hurling team.

== Career ==
Lanigan first played hurling at juvenile and underage levels with the Holycross–Ballycahill club. He won a divisional title in the minor grade in 1984, the same year he won a special county title as a schoolboy with Thurles Vocational School. Lanigan eventually progressed onto the club's senior team and won a Tipperary SHC title in 1990 after beating Cashel King Cormacs in the final. He also won four Mid Tipperary SHC titles between 1985 and 1999.

At inter-county level, had a two-year tenure with the Tipperary minor hurling team, however, Cork was the dominant team in the championship at the time. He immediately progressed onto the under-21 team and was at left corner-forward when the team that beat Offaly in the 1989 All-Ireland under-21 final. Lanigan's performances in the under-21 grade earned a call-up to the senior team's extended training panel during their 1989 All-Ireland SHC-winning campaign.

== Honours ==
Holycross–Ballycahill

- Tipperary Senior Hurling Championship: 1990
- Mid Tipperary Senior Hurling Championship: 1985, 1989, 1990, 1991, 1997, 1999

Tipperary

- All-Ireland Senior Hurling Championship: 1991, 1988
- Munster Senior Hurling Championship: 1991
- All-Ireland Under-21 Hurling Championship: 1989
- Munster Under-21 Hurling Championship: 1989
