= 2008 All-Ireland Under-21 Hurling Championship final =

2008 All-Ireland Under-21 Hurling Championship Final
- Event: 2008 All-Ireland Under-21 Hurling Championship
Kilkenny	Tipperary
2-13	0-15
- Date: 14 September 2009
- Venue: Croke Park, Dublin
- Referee: James Owens (Westmeath)
- Weather: Heavy rain

The 2008 All-Ireland Under-21 Hurling Championship final was a hurling match that was played at Croke Park, Dublin on 14 September 2008 to determine the winners of the 2008 All-Ireland Under-21 Hurling Championship, the 45th season of the All-Ireland Under-21 Hurling Championship, a tournament organised by the Gaelic Athletic Association for the champion teams of the four provinces of Ireland. The final was contested by Kilkenny of Leinster and Tipperary of Munster, with Kilkenny winning by 2-13 to 0-15.

The All-Ireland final between Kilkenny and Tipperary was their ninth meeting in an All-Ireland final. Kilkenny were hoping to claim their 11th championship. Tipperary were hoping to win their ninth All-Ireland title.

Kilkenny moved ahead just 20 seconds after the throw-in when corner-forward Matthew Ruth pointed. Tipp responded well over the next five minutes as Shane Bourke, Pa Bourke and Kevin Lanigan all scored. The sides were level for the fourth time when Tipperary's Sáamus Callanan shrugged off three defenders to point before Ruth replied at the other end. Off a particularly skill-laden move, T. J Reid raced in from the right and hand-passed to the unmarked Ruth who blasted to the net from just outside the square. Ruth was denied a second moments later. Pa Bourke kept Tipp in the hunt at 1-5 to 0-5, however, Matthew Ruth rattled the net for a second time. Eight points down, Tipp had a timely rally just before the break when Brendan Maher and Gearóid Ryan rattled off points.

The tit-for-tat nature of the game continued in the second half as Hogan and Bourke entered into a free-taking duel. The latter hit two more points to reduce the arrears to 2-8 to 0-12. John Mulhall, who had been quiet, exploded into life over the next few minutes and Kilkenny needed him to do so as Tipp were beginning to get on top. Tipp created a goal-scoring opportunity in the 48th minute, but Callanan's ground shot was disappointingly struck straight at the 'keeper. Pa Bourke went for a goal from a close-in free, however, his shot, aimed to the left side of the goal, was deflected over by McGrath for the concession of a point. Patrick Maher was later involved in what might have been a match-defining incident, just a couple of minutes later. Scrambling his way forward at the left edge of the Kilkenny square, he tried to find space to get a strike through on goal but Neil Prendergast came in with a strong challenge and Kilkenny won a free. Pa Bourke's 58th-minute free proved to be Tipp's final point, before Kilkenny added three to seal the win.

Kilkenny's All-Ireland victory was their fourth in six years. The victory put them in joint first position with Cork on the all-time roll of honour.

== Match ==
=== Details ===
14 September 2008

Kilkenny	2-13 - 0-15	Tipperary
M Ruth 2-2; R Hogan 0-6f; TJ Reid, J Mulhall 0-2 each; N Walsh 0-1.	Report	P Bourke 0-8f; G Ryan 0-3; S Bourke, K Lanigan, S Callinan, B Maher 0-1 each.

Croke Park, Dublin
Referee: J Owens (Westmeath)

Kilkenny	Tipperary
