= Ger Williams =

Irish hurler

Personal information
- Native name: Gearóid Mac Liam (Irish)
- Born: 1957 (age 68–69) Cloughjordan, County Tipperary, Ireland
- Occupation: Stores assistant

Sport
- Sport: Hurling
- Position: Right wing-forward
Club
- Years: Club
- Kilruane MacDonaghs
Club titles
- Tipperary titles: 4
- Munster titles: 1
- All-Ireland Titles: 1
Inter-county
Years	County	Apps (scores)
1986-1987	Tipperary	3 (0-00)
Inter-county titles
- Munster titles: 1
- All-Irelands: 0
- NHL: 1
- All Stars: 0

Thomas Gerard Williams (born 1957) is an Irish hurler. At club level he played with Kilruane MacDonaghs and was also a member of the Tipperary senior hurling team.

== Career ==
Williams first played hurling and Gaelic football at juvenile and underage levels with the Kilruane MacDonaghs club. He was part of the club's under-21 hurling team that won four consecutive Tipperary Under-21AHC, while he also won a Tipperary U21AFC title. Williams eventually progressed onto the club's senior team and was at right wing-forward on the Kilruane MacDonaghs team that won the All-Ireland Club Championship title in 1986.

At inter-county level, Williams never played at minor or under-21 levels. His performances at club level earned a call-up to the senior team in 1986. Williams claimed his first inter-county silverware following the 1987 Munster final replay defeat of Cork.

== Honours ==
Kilruane MacDonaghs

- All-Ireland Senior Club Hurling Championship: 1986
- Munster Senior Club Hurling Championship: 1985
- Tipperary Senior Hurling Championship: 1977, 1978, 1979, 1985
- Tipperary Junior A Hurling Championship: 1978

Tipperary

- Munster Senior Hurling Championship: 1987
