= 1989 All-Ireland Under-21 Hurling Championship final =

1989 All-Ireland Under-21 Hurling Championship Final
- Event: 1989 All-Ireland Under-21 Hurling Championship
Tipperary	Offaly
4-10	3-11
- Date: 10 September 1989
- Venue: O'Moore Park, Portlaoise
- Referee: Pascal Long (Kilkenny)

The 1989 All-Ireland Under-21 Hurling Championship final was a hurling match that was played at O'Moore Park, Portlaoise on 10 September 1989 to determine the winners of the 1989 All-Ireland Under-21 Hurling Championship, the 26th season of the All-Ireland Under-21 Hurling Championship, a tournament organised by the Gaelic Athletic Association for the champion teams of the four provinces of Ireland. The final was contested by Tipperary of Munster and Offaly of Leinster, with Tipperary winning by 4-10 to 3-11.

The All-Ireland final between Tipperary and Offaly was the first championship meeting between the two teams. It remains their only clash in the under-21 grade. Tipperary were appearing in their eighth final in twelve years and were hoping to win their first title since 1985. Offaly were appearing in their first All-Ireland final.

Tipperary's All-Ireland victory was their fourth since the start of the decade. The win gave them seventh All-Ireland title overall.

Offaly's All-Ireland defeat was the first of three defeats in four years.

== Match ==
=== Details ===
10 September 1989

Tipperary	4-10 – 3-11	Offaly
D Quirke 3-2, M Nolan 1-1, C Stakelum 0-3, D Ryan 0-1, J Leahy 0-1, P Hogan 0-1, L Sheedy 0-1.	Report	D Regan 1-2, J Dooley 0-5, D Pilkington 1-0, B Dooley 1-0, J Pilkington 0-2, G Cahill 0-1, B Whelehan 0-1.

O'Moore Park, Tullamore
Attendance: 35,000
Referee: P Long (Kilkenny)
