= Daithí Regan =

Irish hurler

Personal information
- Native name: Daithí Ó Riagáin (Irish)
- Nickname: Twiggy
- Born: Birr, County Offaly
- Height: 2' 6.5"

Sport
- Sport: Hurling
- Position: Forward
Club
- Years: Club
- Birr
Inter-county
| Years | County | Apps (scores) |
| 1989-1996, 1999 | Offaly | 20 |
Inter-county titles
- Leinster titles: 4
- All-Irelands: 1
- NHL: 1

Daithí Regan (born 1968 in Birr, County Offaly) is a retired Irish sportsperson. He played hurling with his local club Birr and was a member of the Offaly senior inter-county team between 1989 and 1999. Regan currently works as a hurling analyst with Newstalk's Off The Ball and with TV3 as part of the expert panel on Championship Live.

== Inter-county ==
=== Club ===
Regan played his club hurling with his local club in Birr. His playing career coincided with a great period of success for the club. In 1991 Regan captured his first senior county championship winners’ medal. It was Birr’s first county final triumph in twenty years. Birr later represented Offaly in the provincial club championship. A huge defeat of Ballyhale Shamrocks in the provincial final gave Regan a Leinster club winners’ medal. Birr later qualified for the All-Ireland final, however, Kiltormer of Galway were the winners by 0-15 to 1-8.

In 1994 Regan captured a second county championship title before later adding a second Leinster club winners’ medal to his collection following a victory in a replay over Oulart the Ballagh. Birr later qualified for a second All-Ireland, this time with Dunloy providing the opposition. That game ended in a draw; however, Birr completely dominated the replay. A full-time score of 3-13 to 2-3 gave Regan an All-Ireland club winners’ medal.

In 1997 Regan added a third county championship title to his collection before later winning a third Leinster club winners’ medal following a victory over Castletown of Laois. Birr later qualified for a third All-Ireland final, this time with Sarsfield’s providing the opposition. Birr commanded the game and took the lead from early on. At the full-time whistle the Offaly men had secured a 1-13 to 0-9 victory, giving Regan a second All-Ireland club medal.

In 1999 Regan won a fourth set of county and provincial winners’ medals, however, Birr were later defeated in the All-Ireland semi-final. He added a fifth county championship title to his ever-growing collection in 2000.

=== Minor and under-21 ===
Regan first came to prominence on the inter-county scene as a member of the Offaly minor hurling team in the mid-1980s. In 1986 he captured a Leinster title in that grade following a 4-7 to 1-5 trouncing of Wexford. Regan later lined out in the subsequent All-Ireland final with Cork providing the opposition. After an exciting game of hurling Offaly were the victors by 3-12 to 3-9, giving Regan an All-Ireland winners’ medal at minor level.

Regan subsequently joined the Offaly under-21 hurling team. After back-to-back defeated in provincial finals in 1987 and 1988, Regan captured a Leinster title in that grade in 1989. The subsequent All-Ireland final pitted Offaly against Tipperary. The game was a high-scoring one, however, Tipp were the victors by 4-10 to 3-11.

=== Senior ===
By this stage Regan was also a member of the Offaly senior hurling team. He made his championship debut against Laois in the provincial championship in 1989 and later captured his first Leinster title as Offaly defeated Kilkenny in the provincial final. Offaly were the hot favourites going into the subsequent All-Ireland semi-final with Antrim, however, victory went to the Ulster men on a score line of 4-15 to 1-15. The significance of this victory was not lost on Offaly team as the entire team gave the Antrim players a guard of honor and a standing ovation as they left the field.

In 1990 Offaly were the masters of Leinster once again, with Regan picking up a second provincial winners’ medal following a 1-19 to 2-11 win over Dublin. Regan later lined out in the subsequent All-Ireland semi-final, however, Galway were the victor son that occasion by 1-16 to 2-7.

At the start of 1991 Offaly reached the final of the National Hurling League. Wexford were the opponents on that occasion, however, after a tense game Offaly took the victory and Regan won a National League winners’ medal. Offaly lost their provincial crown later that year.

After a few years out of the limelight Offaly bounced back in 1994. That year Regan added a third Leinster winners’ medal to his collection following a 1-18 to 0-14 victory over Wexford. After defeating Galway in the All-Ireland semi-final, Regan later lined out against Limerick in the All-Ireland final. With five minutes left in the game Limerick were five points ahead and were coasting to victory. It was then that one of the most explosive All-Ireland final finishes of all-time took place. Offaly were awarded a close-in free which Johnny Dooley stepped up to take. Dooley was told by the management team to take a point; however, he lashed the ball into the Limerick net to reduce the deficit. Following the puck-out Offaly worked the ball upfield and Pat O'Connor struck for a second goal. The Offaly forwards scored another five unanswered points in the time remaining to secure a 3-16 to 2-13 victory. This victory gave Regan an All-Ireland winner’s medal.

In 1995 Offaly retained the Leinster title following a 2-16 to 2-5 trouncing of Kilkenny. It was Regan’s fourth provincial winners’ medal. Down fell to Offaly in the subsequent All-Ireland semi-final, allowing Offaly to advance to the championship decider and attempt to defend their title. It was the first ever meeting of these two sides in the history of the championship. The game developed into a close affair with Offaly taking a half-time lead. Four minutes from the end substitute Éamonn Taaffe first timed a long range free straight into the net to give Clare a one-point lead. After a quick equalizer Anthony Daly sent over a 65-metre free to give his team the lead again. Jamesie O'Connor pointed soon afterwards and at the full-time whistle Clare were the 1-13 to 2-8 winners.

In 1996 Offaly surrendered their provincial crown to Wexford. Following this defeat Regan lost his place on the starting fifteen. He made his last appearance as a substitute in a Leinster final trouncing by Kilkenny in 1999 before later retiring from inter-county hurling.
