= Pa O'Neill =

Irish hurler

Personal information
- Native name: Pádraig O'Neill (Irish)
- Born: 6 June 1962 (age 64) Cappawhite, County Tipperary, Ireland
- Occupation: Driver
- Height: 5 ft 10 in (178 cm)

Sport
- Sport: Hurling
- Position: Left wing-forward
Club
- Years: Club
- 1980-2005: Cappawhite
Club titles
- Tipperary titles: 1
Inter-county
Years	County	Apps (scores)
1987-1988	Tipperary	3 (0-03)
Inter-county titles
- Munster titles: 1
- All-Irelands: 0
- NHL: 1
- All Stars: 0

Patrick O'Neill (born 6 June 1962) is an Irish former hurler. At club level, he played with Cappawhite and at inter-county level he was a member of the Tipperary senior hurling team.

== Career ==
O'Neill played hurling and Gaelic football at club level with Cappawhite. After progressing to adult level, he was part of the Cappawhite team that won four West Tipperary SHC titles in five seasons between 1983 and 1987. O'Neill was at left wing-forward when Cappawhite beat Loughmore–Castleiney by 1-17 to 2-13 to win their first Tipperary SHC title in 1987. He was also the championship's top scorer. O'Neill added a Tipperary IFC medal to his collection in 1990, after a 3-05 to 0-06 defeat of Grangemockler in the final.

At inter-county level, O'Neill joined the Tipperary senior hurling team as a result of Cappawhite's club success in 1987. He was also named as team captain. O'Neill claimed his first silverware when he captained Tipperary to the National Hurling League title in 1988. He later won a Munster SHC medal, when Tipperary retained the title after a 2-19 to 1-13 defeat of Cork in the final.

O'Neill was substituted in a number of games during the campaign. He was dropped from the starting fifteen for the 1988 All-Ireland final against Galway, while the captaincy also moved to Nicky English. O'Neill remained on the bench for the 1-15 to 0-14 defeat, in what was his last appearance for the team.

== Honours ==
Cappawhite

- Tipperary Senior Hurling Championship: 1987
- West Tipperary Senior Hurling Championship: 1983, 1984, 1985, 1987
- Tipperary Intermediate Football Championship: 1990

Tipperary

- Munster Senior Hurling Championship: 1988 (c)
- National Hurling League: 1987–88 (c)

Sporting positions
Preceded by Richard Stakelum	Tipperary senior hurling team captain 1988	Succeeded by Nicky English
