= Tom McGrath (Gaelic footballer) =

Irish hurler

Personal information
- Native name: Tomás Mac Craith (Irish)
- Born: 1956 (age 69–70) Loughmore; County Tipperary , Ireland
- Occupation: Retired town clerk

Sport
- Sport: Gaelic football
- Position: Midfield
Club
- Years: Club
- Loughmore–Castleiney
Club titles
	Football	Hurling
Tipperary titles	5	1
Inter-county
- Years: County
- 1975-1985: Tipperary
Inter-county titles
- Munster titles: 0
- All-Irelands: 0
- NFL: 0
- All Stars: 0

Thomas McGrath (born 1956) is an Irish former hurler and Gaelic footballer. At club level he played with Loughmore–Catsleiney as a dual player and was also a member of the Tipperary senior football team.

== Career ==
McGrath first played hurling and Gaelic football at juvenile and underage levels with the Loughmore–Catsleiney club. He won numerous divisional titles in both codes a minor and under-21 level before winning Tipperary U21AFC titles in 1974 and 1976. By that stage McGrath had also joined the club's senior teams in both codes. He won five Tipperary SFC titles between 1977 and 1992, while he was also a member of the Loughmore team that won the Tipperary SHC title in 1988.

McGrath first appeared on the inter-county scene as a dual minor in 1974. He continued his dual status during a three-year tenure with both Tipperary under-21 teams, however, his underage career ended without success as Cork and Kerry were the dominant teams at the time. McGrath joined the Tipperary senior football team in 1975 and, apart from a few seasons with the junior team, was a regular member of the team for almost a decade.

== Family ==
McGrath's brother, Pat McGrath, was a member of the Tipperary team that won the All-Ireland SHC title in 1989. His son, Liam McGrath, has also lined out as a dual player with Tipperary at senior level. His nephews, Brian, John and Noel, were all members of the All-Ireland SHC-winning team in 2019.

== Honours ==
Loughmore–Castleiney

- Tipperary Senior Hurling Championship: 1988
- Tipperary Senior Football Championship: 1977, 1979, 1983, 1987, 1992
- Mid Tipperary Senior Hurling Championship: 1983, 1986, 1987, 1988, 1992, 1994
- Tipperary Under-21 A Football Championship: 1974, 1976
