= 1888 Tipperary Senior Hurling Championship =

Annual hurling competition season

- Champions: Clonoulty (1st title); Thady Ryan (captain)
- Runners-up: Boherlahan

The 1888 Tipperary Senior Hurling Championship was the second staging of the Tipperary Senior Hurling Championship since its establishment by the Tipperary County Board in 1887.

Thurles were the defending champions.

Clonoulty won the championship after a 1–01 to 0–02 defeat of Boherlahan in the final. It was their first ever championship title.
