= 1985 All-Ireland Under-21 Hurling Championship final =

1985 All-Ireland Under-21 Hurling Championship Final
- Event: 1985 All-Ireland Under-21 Hurling Championship
Tipperary	Kilkenny
1-10	2-6
- Date: 25 August 1985
- Venue: Walsh Park, Waterford
- Referee: John Denton (Wexford)

The 1985 All-Ireland Under-21 Hurling Championship final was a hurling match that was played at Walsh Park, Waterford on 25 August 1985 to determine the winners of the 1985 All-Ireland Under-21 Hurling Championship, the 21st season of the All-Ireland Under-21 Hurling Championship, a tournament organised by the Gaelic Athletic Association for the champion teams of the four provinces of Ireland. The final was contested by Kilkenny of Leinster and Tipperary of Munster, with Tipperary winning by 1-10 to 2-6.

The All-Ireland final between Kilkenny and Tipperary was the fourth championship meeting between the two teams and their second successive meeting in an All-Ireland final. Kilkenny were hoping to retain the title for the second time in their history, while Tipperary were appearing in their seventh final in eight years.

Tipperary's All-Ireland victory was their first since 1981. The win gave them fourth sixth All-Ireland title overall.

Kilkenny's All-Ireland defeat was their fifth ever.

== Match ==
=== Details ===
25 August 1985

Tipperary	1-10 – 2-6	Kilkenny
M Scully 0-5, J McGrath 1-0, M Bryan 0-1, N Sheehy 0-1, J Cormack 0-1, A Ryan 0-1, D Kealy 0-1.		J Walsh 1-0, P Cleere 1-0, E Morrissey 0-3, T Bawle 0-1, L Cleere 0-1, R Moran 0-1.

Walsh Park, Waterford
Referee: J Denton (Wexford)
