= 1985 All-Ireland Under-21 Hurling Championship =

All-Ireland Under-21 Hurling Championship 1985
All Ireland Champions
- Winners: Tipperary (6th win)
- Captain: Michael Scully
- Manager: Mick Minogue

All Ireland Runners-up
- Runners-up: Kilkenny
- Captain: Kevin Ryan
- Manager: Martin Fitzpatrick

Provincial Champions
- Munster: Tipperary
- Leinster: Kilkenny
- Ulster: Down
- Connacht: Not Played

The 1985 All-Ireland Under-21 Hurling Championship was the 22nd staging of the All-Ireland Under-21 Hurling Championship since its establishment by the Gaelic Athletic Association in 1964.

Kilkenny entered the championship as the defending champions.

On 25 August 1985, Tipperary won the championship following a 1-10 to 2-06 defeat of Kilkenny in the All-Ireland final. This was their sixth All-Ireland title in the under-21 grade and their first in four championship seasons.

== Results ==
=== Leinster Under-21 Hurling Championship ===
Quarter-finals

12 June 1985 Quarter-final	Laois	1-12 - 4-04	Offaly	Kelly Daly Park
	P McKane 0-5, R Broderick 1-1, O Coss 0-3, P O'Brien 0-2, N Rowe 0-1.		M Currams 1-1, V Teehan 1-1, S Byrne 1-0, M Conneely 1-0, J Buckley 0-1, S White 0-1.

Semi-finals

26 June 1985 Semi-final	Kilkenny	6-09 - 2-07	Offaly	Kelly Daly Park
	M Rafter 2-1, J Walsh 2-0, E Morrissey 1-3, P Cleere 1-0, S Delahunty 0-3, L Cleere 0-1, B Barcoe 0-1.		M Currams 1-3, V Teehan 1-0, S White 0-2, J Lyons 0-1, T Martin 0-1.

Final

21 July 1985 Final	Kilkenny	4-18 - 1-04	Wexford	Croke Park
	M Dunne 2-2, T Phelan 1-3, J Walsh 1-1, M Rafter 0-4, E Morrissey 0-3, T Bawle 0-2, L Cleere 0-1, T Lannon 0-1, R Moran 0-1.		R Murphy 1-0, M Storey 0-2, D Prendergast 0-2.	Referee: P Delaney (Laois)

=== Munster Under-21 Hurling Championship ===
First round

17 April 1985 First round	Tipperary	w/o - scr.	Kerry	Semple Stadium, Thurles

17 April 1985 First round	Clare	2-08 - 1-10	Limerick	Cusack Park, Ennis
	V Donnellan 1-6, G O'Loughlin 1-0, G Mannion 0-1, A Cunningham 0-1.		B Stapleton 1-2, R Sampson 0-3, G Hegarty 0-2, M Scanlon 0-1, G Ryan 0-1, A Carmody 0-1.	Referee: W Horgan (Cork)

Semi-finals

1 May 1985 Semi-final	Waterford	2-08 - 3-11	Tipperary	Walsh Park, Waterford
	P Coffey 1-3, L O'Connor 1-0, D Byrne 0-2, S Ahearne 0-1, P Queally 0-1, R Barry 0-1.		M Scully 0-10, N Sheehy 3-0, T Leamy 0-1.

1 May 1985 Semi-final	Clare	2-10 - 2-09	Cork	FitzGerald Park, Kilmallock
	G O'Loughlin 1-3, T Guilfoyle 1-2, V Donnelan 0-4, J Lee 0-1.		C O'Neill 1-4, T McCarthy 1-1, B Searles 0-2, F Kenneally 0-1, K Fitzgibbon 0-1.

Final

12 July 1985 Final	Tipperary	1-16 - 4-05	Clare	Semple Stadium, Thurles
	M Scully 1-10, A Ryan 0-2, J McGrath 0-1, L Stokes 0-1, J Cormack 0-1, M Bryan 0-1.		D Chaplin 2-1, V Donnelan 1-2, T Guilfoyle 1-0, G O'Loughlin 0-2.	Referee: W Horgan (Cork)

=== All-Ireland Under-21 Hurling Championship ===
Semi-finals

11 August 1985 Semi-final	Tipperary	1-15 - 2-07	Galway	O'Connor Park, Tullamore
	M Sheehy 0-4, J McCormack 0-4, M Scully 0-4, M Bryan 1-0, M Cunningham 0-2, A McGrath 0-1.		A Cunningham 1-2, J Tuohy 1-0, J Cooney 0-3, M Naughton 0-1, S Treacy 0-1.	Referee: J Bailey (Dublin)

11 August 1985 Semi-final	Kilkenny	2-12 - 0-04	Down	Páirc Tailteann, Navan
	E Morrissey 2-5, M Dunne 0-2, J Scott 0-2, L Cleere 0-1, B Young 0-1, J Walsh 0-1.		D O'Prey 0-3, J McCarthy 0-1.	Referee: J Long (Tipperary)

Final

25 August 1985 Final	Tipperary	1-10 - 2-06	Kilkenny	Walsh Park, Waterford
	M Scully 0-5, J McGrath 1-0, D Kealey 0-1, A Ryan 0-1, J Cormack 0-1, N Sheehy 0-1, M Bryan 0-1.		T Ball 1-1, J Walsh 1-0, E Morrissey 0-3, R Moran 0-1, L Cleere 0-1.	Referee: J Denton (Wexford)
