= 2002 Tipperary Senior Hurling Championship =

Annual hurling competition season

- Dates: 14 September – 10 November 2002
- Teams: 16
- Sponsor: Credit Unions Tipperary
- Champions: Mullinahone (1st title); Ky Vaughan (captain); John Leahy (manager)
- Runners-up: Thurles Sarsfields; Gary Mernagh (captain); Paddy Doyle (manager)

Tournament statistics
- Matches played: 16
- Goals scored: 48 (3 per match)
- Points scored: 393 (24.56 per match)
- Top scorer(s): Eoin Kelly; Pat Croke; Johnny Enright; Ger O'Grady

The 2002 Tipperary Senior Hurling Championship was the 111th staging of the Tipperary Senior Hurling Championship since its establishment by the Tipperary County Board in 1887. The championship began on 14 September 2002 and ended on 10 November 2002.

Toomevara were the defending champions, however, they were defeated by Mullinahone at the semi-final stage.

On 10 November 2002, Mullinahone won the title after a 2–10 to 1–11 defeat of Thurles Sarsfields in a final replay at Semple Stadium. It remains their only championship title.

Eoin Kelly, Pat Croke, Johnny Enright and Ger O'Grady were the championship's top scorers.

== Format change ==
The number of participating teams increased from eight to sixteen as all participants in the four divisional semi-finals qualified. Divisional teams entered the county championship at different stages. In round one the eight beaten divisional semi-finalists played off to produce four teams. In round two these four teams played the defeated divisional finalists. The four winners played the four divisional winners in the quarter-finals, from which followed the semis and final.

Relegation was also introduced for the first time. Any team that didn't reach the semi-final stage in the respective divisional championships faced the prospect of relegation from senior to intermediate.

== Results ==
=== First round ===
14 September 2002 First round	Thurles Sarsfields	2-20 - 2-09	Carrick Swans	Clonmel Sportsfield, Clonmel
	J Enright 0-10, L Corbett 1-5, E Costelloe 1-0, G O'Grady 0-3, T Ruth 0-1, B O'Dwyer 0-1.		P Loughman 2-3, R Dunne 0-4, J Brophy 0-1, AP Ryan 0-1.	Referee: J Ryan (Cashel King Cormacs)

14 September 2002 First round	Roscrea	1-15 - 2-08	Cashel King Cormacs	Páirc Shíleáin, Templemore
	J Carroll 1-1, J McDonnell 0-3, P Carroll 0-3, M Ryan 0-2, Donal Hogan 0-2, V Dooley 0-2, Damien Hogan 0-1, L England 0-1,		K O'Sullivan 1-3, B Moloney 1-0, TJ Ryan 0-1, R Ryan 0-1, P Taylor 0-1, G O'Dwyer 0-1, J O'Leary 0-1.	Referee: W Barrett (Ardfinnan)

28 September 2002 First round	Galtee Rovers	2-14 - 2-12	Portroe	The Ragg, Bouladuff
	D Morrissey 1-5, P Morrissey 0-7, L Quinn 1-0, A Morrissey 0-2.		D Gleeson 1-2, D Hogan 1-1, L Sheedy 0-4, J Ryan 0-2, B O'Driscoll 0-1, S Creamer 0-1, A Kennedy 0-1.	Referee: W Barrett (Ardfinnan)

29 September 2002 First round	Ballingarry	1-17 - 2-11	Holycross-Ballycahill	Leahy Park, Cashel
	L Cahill 0-4, P 'Blondie' Ivors 0-4, D Lyons 1-0, D Shelley 0-3, T Ivors 0-2, J Holohan 0-2, A Cleere 0-1, B Cooney 0-1.		J Ferncombe 1-5, T Burke 1-0, T Fogarty 0-2, B Ryan 0-1, M Lee 0-1, D Carr 0-1,

=== Second round ===
6 October 2002 Second round	Thurles Sarsfields	1-16 - 0-14	Kickhams	Leahy Park, Cashel
	J Enright 0-7, G O'Grady 1-2, E Enright 0-2, T Ruth 0-2, S Mason 0-1, T Collins 0-1, L Corbett 0-1.		R Horgan 0-5, G Butler 0-3, P Breen 0-2, J McCormack 0-1, V Kelly 0-1, D McGrath 0-1, B Horgan 0-1.

6 October 2002 Second round	Roscrea	2-13 - 3-08	Moycarkey-Borris	Páirc Shíleáin, Templemore
	C Egan 1-2, J Carroll 1-1, M Ryan 0-4, D Hogan 0-3, P Carroll 0-1, P Loughnane 0-1, T Fitzgerald 0-1.		W Dempsey 1-2, E Ryan 1-0, A Kirby 1-0, C Ryan 0-3, R Doran 0-1, J Flanagan 0-1, R Quigley 0-1.	Referee: P Russell (Emly)

6 October 2002 Second round	Ballingarry	0-16 - 2-09	Moneygall	Páirc Shíleáin, Templemore
	L Cahill 0-9, D Shelley 0-4, P Ivors 0-1, P Cleere 0-1, T Ivors 0-1.		J Coughlan 0-6, W Greene 1-2, E McCormack 1-0, E Fanning 0-1.	Referee: W Clohessey (Drom-Inch)

13 October 2002 Second round	Killenaule	3-06 - 2-07	Galtee Rovers	Leahy Park, Cashel
	C O'Donnell 1-0, M Farrell 1-0, J Gleeson 1-0, T Doyle 0-2, P Kerwick 0-2, J O'Dwyer 0-2.		D Byron 2-0, P Morrissey 0-6, A Morrissey 0-1.	Referee: D Curtis (Thurles)

=== Quarter-finals ===
13 October 2002 Quarter-final	Toomevara	1-16 - 0-13	Ballingarry	Semple Stadium, Thurles
	T Dunne 0-8, M Bevans 1-0, J O'Brien 0-3, K Dunne 0-1, F Devaney 0-1, W Ryan 0-1, P McGrath 0-1, B Dunne 0-1.		P Ivers 0-4, D Shelley 0-3, L Cahill 0-2, J Holohan 0-2, G Ivers 0-1, A Cleere 0-1.	Referee: J Ryan (Cashel)

13 October 2002 Quarter-final	Thurles Sarsfields	2-12 - 1-14	Clonoulty-Rossmore	Semple Stadium, Thurles
	G O'Grady 1-4, E Costelloe 1-0, C McIntyre 0-2, T Ruth 0-2, S Mason 0-2, T Collins 0-1, J Enright 0-1.		M Kennedy 0-6, D Ryan 1-1, A Butler 0-3, M Quirke 0-2, K Ryan 0-1, T Butler 0-1.	Referee: J McDonnell (Roscrea)

13 October 2002 Quarter-final	Mullinahoe	3-17 - 0-09	Roscrea	Semple Stadium, Thurles
	P Croke 1-8, C Arrigan 1-1, B O'Meara 1-1, E Kelly 0-4, E Carey 0-2, P Kelly 0-1.		P Carroll 0-3, D Hogan 0-3, M Ryan 0-2, B Brooks 0-1.

20 October 2002 Quarter-final	Loughmore-Castleiney	2-09 - 0-10	Killenaule	Semple Stadium, Thurles
	T Ormonde 1-3, D Bourke 1-2, S Bohan 0-3, N Cahill 0-1.		J Gleeson 0-2, T Doyle 0-2, P Shelley 0-2, P Kerwick 0-2, J Ceaser 0-1, M Blake 0-1.	Referee: M Cahill

=== Semi-finals ===
20 October 2002 Semi-final	Mullinahone	1-15 - 1-14	Toomevara	Semple Stadium, Thurles
	P Croke 1-7, E Kelly 0-4, P Kelly 0-3, B O'Meara 0-1.	Report	T Dunne 1-4, K Dunne 0-4, J O'Brien 0-3, E Brislane 0-2, W Ryan 0-1.	Referee: J Ryan

27 October 2002 Semi-final	Thurles Sarsfields	3-13 - 4-07	Loughmore-Castleiney	Páirc Shíleáin, Templemore
	E Walsh 3-0, C McIntyre 0-4, S Mason 0-3, G O'Grady 0-3, T Collins 0-1, L Corbett 0-1, T Ruth 0-1.		P McGrath 2-1, E Sweeney 1-5, D Bourke 1-0, S Bohan 0-1.	Referee: S Roche

=== Finals ===
3 November 2002 Final	Mullinahone	0-14 - 0-14	Thurles Sarsfields	Semple Stadium, Thurles
	E Kelly, J Leahy (1f) 0-4 each, E Carey, P Croke 0-2 (2f) each, C Arrigan, N Leahy 0-each.	Report	L Corbett, S Mason (2f, 1 '65') 0-3 each, M O'Dowd, G O'Grady, C McIntyre (2f) 0-2 each, J Lawlor, P Lawlor 0-1 each.	Referee: P Russell (Emly)

10 November 2002 Final replay	Mullinahone	2-10 - 1-11	Thurles Sarsfields	Semple Stadium, Thurles
	E Kelly 2-7 (1-5f, 1 '65'), P Croke 0-2 (1f), J Leahy 0-1.	Report	J Enright 0-7 (5f), G O'Grady 1-2, P Lawlor, M O'Dowd 0-1 each.	Referee: J O'Donnell

== Championship statistics ==
=== Top scorers ===
Overall

Rank	Player	Club	Tally	Total	Matches	Average
1	Ger O'Grady	Thurles Sarsfields	3-16	25	6	4.16
1	Eoin Kelly	Mullinahone	2-19	25	4	6.25
1	Pat Croke	Mullinahone	2-19	25	4	6.25
1	Johnny Enright	Thurles Sarsfields	0-25	25	6	4.16
5	Tommy Dunne	Toomevara	1-12	15	2	7.50
5	Liam Cahill	Ballingarry	0-15	15	3	5.00
7	Lar Corbett	Thurles Sarsfields	1-10	13	6	2.16
7	Pa Morrissey	Galtee Rovers	1-10	13	2	6.50

In a single game

Rank	Player	Club	Tally	Total	Opposition
1	Eoin Kelly	Mullinahone	2-07	13	Thurles Sarsfields
2	Pat Croke	Mullinahone	1-08	11	Roscrea
3	Pat Croke	Mullinahone	1-07	10	Toomevara
3	Johnny Enright	Thurles Sarsfields	0-10	10	Carrick Swans
5	Éamonn Walsh	Thurles Sarsfields	3-00	9	Loughmore-Castleiney
5	Philip Loughman	Carrick Swans	2-03	9	Thurles Sarsfields
5	Liam Cahill	Ballingarry	0-09	9	Moneygall
8	Lar Corbett	Thurles Sarsfields	1-05	8	Carrick Swans
8	Dan Morrissey	Galtee Rovers	1-05	8	Portroe
8	John Ferncombe	Holycross-Ballycahill	1-05	8	Ballingarry
8	Evan Sweeney	Loughmore-Castleiney	1-05	8	Thurles Sarsfields
8	Tommy Dunne	Toomevara	0-08	8	Ballingarry

=== Miscellaneous ===
- [[Mullinahone GAA|Mullinahone]] win the title for the first time.
- Cashel King Cormacs and Roscrea met in the championship for the first time since 1981.
