= Justin Cottrell =

Irish hurler

Personal information
- Native name: Siústan Mac Oitiril (Irish)
- Born: 27 March 1977 (age 49) Toomevara, County Tipperary, Ireland
- Occupation: Electrician
- Height: 5 ft 11 in (180 cm)

Sport
- Sport: Hurling
- Position: Goalkeeper
Club
- Years: Club
- 1994-2005: Toomevara
Club titles
- Tipperary titles: 7
- Munster titles: 1
Inter-county
Years	County	Apps (scores)
1997; 2002-2004	Tipperary	0 (0-00)
Inter-county titles
- Munster titles: 0
- All-Irelands: 0
- NHL: 0
- All Stars: 0

Justin Cottrell (born 27 March 1977) is an Irish former hurler. At club level he played with Toomevara, and also lined out at inter-county level with various Tipperary teams.

== Career ==
Cottrell first played hurling at juvenile and underage levels with the Toomevara club, winning numerous divisional championship titles before claiming a Tipperary U21HC title in 1995. He was still eligible for the minor grade when he won his first Tipperary SHC medal as sub goalkeeper in 1994. Cottrell had succeeded Jody Grace as first-choice goalkeeper by the time Toomevara won four Tippearry SHC titles in-a-row team from 1998 to 2001. He claimed further back-to-back titles in 2003 and 2004, before ending his club career by winning a Munster Club SHC medal in 2004.

Cottrell first appeared on the inter-county scene for Tipperary as a member of the under-21 team. His three-year tenure from 1996 to 1998 ended without success as Cork dominated the Munster U21HC at this time. Cottrell was drafted onto the senior team at just 20 and was sub goalkeeper to Brendan Cummins for the 1997 All-Ireland final defeat by Clare. He was dropped off the panel the following year, but returned once again as sub goalkeeper from 2002 to 2004.

== Honours ==
Toomevara

- Munster Senior Club Hurling Championship: 2004
- Tipperary Senior Hurling Championship: 1994, 1998, 1999, 2000 (c), 2001 (c), 2003, 2004, 2008
- North Tipperary Senior Hurling Championship: 1994, 1995, 1997, 1999, 2000, 2002, 2003
- Tipperary Under-21 A Hurling Championship: 1995
