= 2000 Tipperary Senior Hurling Championship =

Annual hurling competition season

- Dates: 9 September – 15 October 2000
- Teams: 8
- Sponsor: Credit Unions
- Champions: Toomevara (16th title); Justin Cottrell (captain); Pad Joe Whelehan (manager)
- Runners-up: Thurles Sarsfields; Brendan Carroll (captain); Paddy Doyle (manager)

Tournament statistics
- Matches played: 8
- Goals scored: 24 (3 per match)
- Points scored: 214 (26.75 per match)
- Top scorer(s): Paddy O'Brien (3-18); Johnny Enright (0-27)

The 2000 Tipperary Senior Hurling Championship was the 109th staging of the Tipperary Senior Hurling Championship since its establishment by the Tipperary County Board in 1887. The championship began on 9 September 2000 and ended on 15 October 2000.

Toomevara were the defending champions.

On 15 October 2000, Toomevara won the title after a 2–10 to 0–11 defeat of Thurles Sarsfields in the final at Semple Stadium. It was their 16th championship title overall and their third title in succession.

Paddy O'Brien from Toomevara and Johnny Enright from Thurles Sarsfields were the championship joint top scorers.

== Results ==
=== Quarter-finals ===
9 September 2000 Quarter-final	Kickhams	5-11 - 2-13	Carrick Swans	Semple Stadium, Thurles
	R Horgan 2-6, G Butler 2-2, M O'Brien 1-2, A Horgan 0-1.		D Hogan 1-3, W Barrett 1-0, R Dunne 0-3, B Ryan 0-2, A Ryan 0-2, J Grace 0-1, J Burke 0-1, S Lonergan 0-1.	Referee: J Collins (Templederry)

9 September 2000 Quarter-final	Cappawhite	2-15 - 1-16	Ballingarry	Semple Stadium, Thurles
	S O'Neill 1-0, F Quinn 1-0, S Ryan 0-3, E O'Neill 0-3, J Ryan 0-2, P Julian 0-2, Pat O'Neill 0-2, Pa O'Neill 0-2, M Ryan 0-1.		L Cahill 0-8, D Lyons 1-0, D Shelly 0-3, A Cleere 0-2, P Ivors 0-2, D Walton 0-1.	Referee: W Clohessey (Drom-Inch)

16 September 2000 Quarter-final	Toomevara	3-12 - 2-07	Loughmore-Casteliney	The Ragg, Bouladuff
	P O'Brien 2-4, M O'Meara 1-1, K Dunne 0-4, M Beavans 0-1, P McGrath 0-1, K Cummins 0-1.		S Bohan 1-0, N Ryan 1-0, P McGrath 0-3, N Morris 0-1, N Cahill 0-1, T Ormonde 0-1, D Kennedy 0-1.	Referee: W Barrett (Ardfinnan)

17 September 2000 Quarter-final	Thurles Sarsfields	1-19 - 0-16	Moneygall	Páirc Shíleáin, Templemore
	J Enright 0-9, G O'Grady 1-4, L Corbett 0-3, M O'Dowd 0-2, C Maher 0-1.		J Daughan 0-5, T Tuohy 0-3, P Whyte 0-3, J Smyth 0-2, D Daughan 0-2, D Kennedy 0-1.

=== Semi-finals ===
1 October 2000 Semi-final	Toomevara	1-17 - 2-07	Kickhams	Semple Stadium, Thurles
	P O'Brien 1-8, M Bevins 0-2, K Cummins 0-2, J O'Brien 0-2, T Dunne 0-2, T Dunne 0-1.		R Horgan 1-2, P Morrissey 1-0, V Kelly 0-2, G Butler 0-2, A Qualter 0-1.	Referee: M Cahill

1 October 2000 Semi-final	Thurles Sarsfields	1-10 - 0-13	Cappawhite	Semple Stadium, Thurles
	M O'Dowd 1-1, J Enright 0-4, E Enright 0-2, L Corbett 0-2, G O'Grady 0-1.		E O'Neill 0-7, S Ryan 0-3, P O'Neill 0-2, F Quinn 0-1.

8 October 2000 Semi-final replay	Thurles Sarsfields	1-24 - 1-13	Cappawhite	Semple Stadium, Thurles
	J Enright 0-10, G O'Grady 1-4, E Enright 0-4, B Carroll 0-2, L Corbett 0-2, M O'Dowd 0-1, T Ryan 0-1.		E O'Neill 0-7, J Ryan 1-1, F Quinn 0-3, P O'Neill 0-2.	Referee: M Cahill

=== Final ===
15 October 2000 Final	Toomevara	2-10 - 0-11	Thurles Sarsfields	Semple Stadium, Thurles
	J O'Brien 2-2, P O'Brien 0-6, K Dunne, T Dunne 0-1 each.	Report	J Enright 0-4, E Enright 0-2, B Carroll, G O'Grady, L Corbett, C Maher, S Mason 0-1 each.	Referee: W Barrett (Ardfinnan)

== Championship statistics ==
=== Top scorers ===
Top scorer overall

Rank	Player	Club	Tally	Total	Matches	Average
1	Paddy O'Brien	Toomevara	3-18	27	3	9.00
1	Johnny Enright	Thurles Sarsfields	0-27	27	4	6.75
3	Richard Horgan	Kickhams	3-08	17	2	8.50
3	Eugene O'Neill	Cappawhite	0-17	17	3	5.66
5	Ger O'Grady	Thurles Sarsfields	2-10	16	4	4.00
6	Ger Butler	Kickhams	2-04	10	2	5.00
6	John O'Brien	Kickhams	2-04	10	3	3.33
8	Liam Cahill	Ballingarry	0-08	8	1	8.00
8	Lar Corbett	Thurles Sarsfields	0-08	8	4	2.00
10	Francis Quinn	Cappawhite	1-04	7	3	2.44
10	Matty O'Dowd	Thurles Sarsfields	1-04	7	4	1.75

Top scorers in a single game

Rank	Player	Club	Tally	Total	Opposition
1	Richard Horgan	Kickhams	2-06	12	Carrick Swans
2	Paddy O'Brien	Toomevara	1-08	11	Kickhams
3	Paddy O'Brien	Toomevara	2-04	10	Loughmore-Castleiney
3	Johnny Enright	Thurles Sarsfields	0-10	10	Cappawhite
5	Johnny Enright	Thurles Sarsfields	0-09	9	Moneygall
6	Ger Butler	Kickhams	2-02	8	Carrick Swans
6	John O'Brien	Toomevara	2-02	8	Thurles Sarsfields
6	Liam Cahill	Ballingarry	0-08	8	Cappawhite
9	Ger O'Grady	Thurles Sarsfields	1-04	7	Moneygall
9	Ger O'Grady	Thurles Sarsfields	1-04	7	Cappawhite
9	Eugene O'Neill	Cappawhite	0-07	7	Thurles Sarsfields
9	Eugene O'Neill	Cappawhite	0-07	7	Thurles Sarsfields
