= 2003 Tipperary Senior Hurling Championship =

Annual hurling competition season

- Dates: 31 August – 12 October 2003
- Teams: 16
- Sponsor: Tipperary Credit Unions
- Champions: Toomevara (18th title); Michael Bevans (captain); Michael Connolly (manager)
- Runners-up: Thurles Sarsfields; Tommy Maher (captain); Denis Maher (manager)

Tournament statistics
- Matches played: 15
- Goals scored: 56 (3.73 per match)
- Points scored: 415 (27.67 per match)
- Top scorer(s): John Doughan (2–24)

The 2003 Tipperary Senior Hurling Championship was the 112th staging of the Tipperary Senior Hurling Championship since its establishment by the Tipperary County Board in 1887. The championship ran from 31 August to 12 October 2003.

Mullinahone were the defending champions, however, they were beaten by Thurles Sarsfields in the quarter-finals.

The final was played on 12 October 2003 at Semple Stadium in Thurles, between Toomevara and Thurles Sarsfields, in what was their third meeting in the final in four years. Toomevara won the match by 3–19 to 3–16 to claim their 18th championship title overall and a first title in two years.

Moneygall's John Doughan was the championship's top scorer with 2–24.

== Results ==
=== First round ===
31 August 2003 First round	Killenaule	0-18 - 0-13	Cashel King Cormacs	Barracks Field
	T Shelly 0-5, M Farrell 0-3, P Kerwick 0-3, T Doyle 0-3, J Caesar 0-3, J Gleeson 0-1.		T Moloney 0-9, R Ryan 0-2, P Taylor 0-1, S O'Donoghue 0-1.

6 September 2003 First round	Cappawhite	5-17 - 1-08	Carrick Swans	Clonmel GAA Ground
	S Ryan 5-3, E O'Neill 0-6, D Kelly 0-3, A O'Neill 0-2, P Julian 0-1, G Ryan 0-1, F Quinn 0-1.		AP Ryan 1-2, R Dunne 0-5, P Loughman 0-1.

7 September 2003 First round	Boherlahan–Dualla	4-18 - 0-10	Newport	Dolla Grounds
	D Hickey 0-8, L Burke 2-0, G Flanagan 1-3, P O'Dwyer 0-4, D Burke 1-0, P Hickey 0-1, B O'Dwyer 0-1, D Maher 0-1.		E Shinnors 0-6, C O'Mahony 0-2, A O'Gorman 0-1, D O'Gorman 0-1.

7 September 2003 First round	Moneygall	1-15 - 0-12	Upperchurch–Drombane	Páirc Shíleáin
	J Doughan 0-7, P Whyte 1-1, E Mccormack 0-3, M Keeshan 0-2, W Greene 0-1, D Doughan 0-1.		P Shortt 0-8, A Kinnane 0-2, J Brennan 0-1, B Phelan 0-1.

=== Second round ===
13 September 2003 Second round	Moneygall	4-10 - 0-08	Ballingarry	Páirc Shíleáin
	J Doughan 2-4, W Greene 1-2, D Doughan 1-0, M Keeshan 0-3, D O'Dwyer 0-1.		D Shelly 0-6, L Cahill 0-1, P Ivors 0-1.

14 September 2003 Second round	Thurles Sarsfields	3-12 - 1-14	Killenaule	Boherlahan Grounds
	L Corbett 1-3, G O'Grady 1-2, E Costello 1-1, J Enright 0-3, W Culley 0-2, E Enright 0-1.		T Shelly 0-9, M Farrell 1-1, T Doyle 0-2, D Fanning 0-1, J Gleeson 0-1.

14 September 2003 Second round	Knockavilla–Donaskeigh Kickhams	3-09 - 2-10	Boherlahan–Dualla	Leahy Park
	A Butler 2-5, A Horgan 1-1, B Horgan 0-2, E Morrissey 0-1.		L Burke 1-2, D Hickey 1-1, P O'Dwyer 0-2, G Flanagan 0-2, S Murphy 0-1, P Hickey 0-1, B O'Dwyer 0-1.

14 September 2003 Second round	nenagh Éire Óg	6-15 - 0-10	Cappawhite	Lacken Park
	M Cleary 1-5, D O'Meara 2-1, K Tucker 1-3, J Flannery 1-0, D Hackett 1-0, R Tomlinson 0-2, D Tucker 0-2, N Moloney 0-1, B Darcy 0-1.		E O'Neill 0-6, D Kelly 0-2, S Ryan 0-1, F Quinn 0-1.

=== Quarter-finals ===
20 September 2003 Quarter-final	Moneygall	1-13 - 1-11	Loughmore–Castleiney	Páirc Shíleáin
	J Doughan 0-7, M Keeshan 1-2, E McCormack 0-2, P Whyte 0-1, E Fanning 0-1.		D Bourke 1-1, M Gleeson 0-4, E Sweeney 0-2, S Bohan 0-2, T Ormond 0-1, D Laffan 0-1.

21 September 2003 Quarter-final	nenagh Éire Óg	2-15 - 2-10	Galtee Rovers	Páirc Shíleáin
	M Cleary 0-6, R Tomlinson 1-1, D O'Meara 1-1, N Moloney 0-3, J Kennedy 0-1, K Tucker 0-1, E Tucker 0-1, D Hackett 0-1.		P Morrissey 0-7, D Byron 1-1, M Scanlon 1-0, D Morrissey 0-1, K Bergin 0-1.

21 September 2003 Quarter-final	Thurles Sarsfields	2-19 - 2-11	Mullinahone	Leahy Park
	J Enright 0-9, E Costello 1-2, G O'Grady 0-5, L Corbett 1-0, W Cully 0-2, S Ryan 0-1.		E Kelly 1-8, C Arrigan 1-0, B O'Meara 0-1, D Byrne 0-1, P Kelly 0-1.

21 September 2003 Quarter-final	Toomevara	2-21 - 1-11	Knockavilla–Donaskeigh Kickhams	Páirc Shíleáin
	K Dunne 0-9, F Devaney 1-1, P O'Brien 0-4, W Ryan 1-2, M Bevans 0-2, E Brislane 0-2.		A Butler 0-4, A Heaney 1-0, B Horgan 0-3, P Dwyer 0-2, E Morrissey 0-1, F Horgan 0-1.

=== Semi-finals ===
27 September 2003 Semi-final	Toomevara	2-19 - 0-16	Moneygall	Semple Stadium
	K Dunne 1-9, E Brislane 1-0, P O'Brien 0-3, F Devaney 0-2, J O'Brien 0-2, W Ryan 0-1, Terry Dunne 0-1, Tommy Dunne 0-1.		J Doughan 0-6, E McCormack 0-2, M Keeshan 0-2, W Greene 0-2, D Kennedy 0-1, E Fanning 0-1, P Whyte 0-1, D Dwyer 0-1.

27 September 2003 Semi-final	Thurles Sarsfields	3-17 - 2-18	Nenagh Éire Óg	Semple Stadium
	J Enright 1-8, S Ryan 1-1, E Costello 1-0, G O'Grady 0-2, W Cully 0-2, T Ruth 0-1, R Ruth 0-1, J Lillis 0-1, E Walshe 0-1.		M Cleary 1-8, D O'Meara 1-2, K Tucker 0-4, R Tomlinson 0-2, E Tucker 0-1, M Hackett 0-1.

=== Final ===
12 October 2003 Final	Toomevara	3-19 - 3-16	Thurles Sarsfields	Semple Stadium
	M Bevans 1-3, K Dunne 0-6, P O'Brien 1-1, Terry Dunne 0-3, E Brislane 0-3, Tommy Dunne 1-0, J O'Brien 0-2, W Ryan 0-1.		L Corbett 2-1, J Enright 0-6, R Ruth 1-0, W Cully 0-3, T Ruth 0-3, G O'Grady 0-2, E Enright 0-1.	Referee: S Roche (Kilsheelan)

== Championship statistics ==
=== Top scorers ===
Rank	Player	Club	Tally	Total	Matches	Average
1	John Doughan	Moneygall	2-24	30	4	7.50
2	Johnny Enright	Thurles Sarsfields	1-26	29	4	7.25
3	Ken Dunne	Toomevara	1-24	27	3	9.00
4	Michael Cleary	Nenagh Éire Óg	2-19	25	3	8.33
5	Seánie Ryan	Cappawhite	5-04	19	2	9.50
6	Declan O'Meara	Nenagh Éire Óg	4-04	16	3	5.33
6	Lar Corbett	Thurles Sarsfields	4-04	16	4	4.00
8	Aidan Butler	K/D Kickhams	2-09	15	2	7.50
9	Tony Shelly	Killenaule	0-14	14	2	7.00
10	Dara Hickey	Boherlahan–Dualla	1-09	12	2	6.00
10	Eugene O'Neill	Cappawhite	0-12	12	2	6.00
