= 2009 Tipperary Senior Hurling Championship =

Annual hurling competition season

- Dates: 12 September – 18 October 2009
- Teams: 18
- Champions: Thurles Sarsfields (30th title); Johnny Enright (captain); Michael Gleeson (manager)
- Runners-up: Drom-Inch; James Woodlock (captain); Pat Looby (manager)

Tournament statistics
- Matches played: 17
- Goals scored: 41 (2.41 per match)
- Points scored: 517 (30.41 per match)
- Top scorer(s): Pa Bourke (1–39)

The 2009 Tipperary Senior Hurling Championship was the 118th staging of the Tipperary Senior Hurling Championship since its establishment by the Tipperary County Board in 1887. The championship ran from 12 September to 18 October 2009.

Toomevara were the defending champions, however, they were defeated by Drom & Inch in the semi-finals.

The final was played on 18 October 2009 at Semple Stadium in Thurles, between Thurles Sarsfields and Drom & Inch, in what was their second meeting in the final overall. Thurles Sarsfields won the match by 0–14 to 0–05 to claim their 30th championship title overall and a first title in four years.

Pa Bourke was the championship's top scorer with 1–39.

== Results ==
=== First round ===
This round featured the eight beaten divisional semi-finalists and the four beaten divisional finalists in a playoff of six games.

12 September 2009 First round	Portroe	3-13 - 0-19	Ballybacon–Grange	Boherlahan Grounds
	M Sheedy 2-2, J Sheedy 0-7, M Creamer 1-1, J Ryan 0-3.		J English 0-10, B Hewitt 0-2, A Savage 0-2, P Hally 0-2, A Cowan 0-1, A O'Gorman 0-1, B Cummins 0-1.

12 September 2009 First round	Toomevara	3-20 - 1-10	Carrick Swans	Boherlahan Grounds
	K Dunne 0-6, B McCormack 2-0, P O'Brien 0-3, J O'Brien 1-0, W Ryan 0-2, F Devanney 0-2, P Grace 0-2, M Bevans 0-2, T Dunne 0-1, J McLoughney 0-1, D Young 0-1.		K Reade 1-0, D Fogarty 0-2, S Hahessy 0-2, D O'Hanlon 0-2, R Dunne 0-2, J Walsh 0-1, P Diffily 0-1.

13 September 2009 First round	Upperchurch–Drombane	2-18 - 0-17	Cappawhite	Páirc Shíleáin
	J Brennan 1-5, J Barry 0-4, C Stapleton 1-1, P Greene 0-2, P Shortt 0-2, A Kinnane 0-1, LJ Ryan 0-1, J Maguire 0-1, O Shortt 0-1.		E O'Neill 0-5, P O'Neill 0-3, T Treacy 0-3, MP Buckley 0-1, S Ryan 0-1, M O'Neill 0-1, J Carr 0-1, C Ryan 0-1, F Ryan 0-1.

13 September 2009 First round	Borris–Ileigh	1-20 - 0-14	Loughmore–Castleiney	Páirc Shíleáin
	D O'Connor 1-6, B Mahe3 0-4, M Bourke 0-4, V Stapleton 0-2, K Maher 0-1, M Stapleton 0-1, M Maher 0-1, D Maher 0-1.		N McGrath 0-9, E Sweeney 0-2, T King 0-1, M Webster 0-1, J Egan 0-1.

13 September 2009 First round	Killenaule	1-21 - 0-11	Golden–Kilfeacle	Leahy Park
	J O'Dwyer 1-11, N O'Dwyer 0-3, P Kerwick 0-2, K Murphy 0-1, M O'Donnell 0-1, M Doyle 0-1, T Shelly 0-1, D Fanning 0-1.		M Harding 0-7, J McCarthy 0-2, A Fogarty 0-2.

13 September 2009 First round	Thurles Sarsfields	0-18 - 1-08	Knockavilla–Donaskeigh Kickhams	Leahy Park
	P Bourke 0-8, R Ruth 0-4, S Lillis 0-3, J Enright 0-2, L Corbett 0-1.		S Morrissey 1-1, F Horgan 0-3, D Breen 0-2, M Heelan 0-1, N Hayes 0-1.

=== Second round ===
This round featured the six first round winners and the two Séamus Ó Riain Cup finalists in a playoff of four games.

19 September 2009 Second round	Upperchurch–Drombane	1-16 - 0-11	Portroe	Páirc Shíleáin
	P Greene 0-5, C Stapleton 1-1, LJ Ryan 0-3, C Ryan 0-2, P Shortt 0-2, J Greene 0-1, J Brennan 0-1, J Barry 0-1.		J Sheedy 0-5, J Ryan 0-2, M Gennery 0-2, D Hogan 0-1, M Creamer 0-1.

19 September 2009 Second round	Toomevara	4-16 - 1-14	Killenaule	Páirc Shíleáin
	K Dunne 1-7, J O'Brien 1-2, T Dunne 1-2, W Ryan 1-1, M Bevans 0-2, F Devaney 0-1, J McLoughney 0-1.		D McCormack 1-2, N O'Dwyer 0-3, J O'Dwyer 0-3, J Caesar 0-2, M Doyle 0-2, P Kerwick 0-2.

20 September 2009 Second round	Thurles Sarsfields	2-22 - 1-10	Kilruane MacDonaghs	Dolla Grounds
	P Bourke 1-8, L Corbett 1-2, R Ruth 0-3, J Enright 0-2, S Ryan 0-1, A Kennedy 0-1, M Gleeson 0-1, D Maher 0-1, G O'Grady 0-1, D O'Dwyer 0-1, S Lillis 0-1.		M O'Leary 0-3, B O'Meara 0-3, S Quinlan 1-0, S Hennessy 0-2, M Costello 0-1, J Cahill 0-1.

20 September 2009 Second round	Borris–Ileigh	2-17 - 1-13	Lorrha	MacDonagh Park
	D O'Connor 1-6, B Maher 0-3, J Keane 0-3, M Stapleton 1-0, M Maher 0-1, M Bourke 0-1, K Ryan 0-1, V Stapleton 0-1, P Maher 0-1.		N Hogan 0-4, C Duggan 1-1, R O'Meara 0-3, C Haugh 0-2, C Hogan 0-1, W Maher 0-1, M Cleary 0-1.

=== Quarter-finals ===
This round featured the four second round winners and the four divisional finalists in a playoff of four games.

26 September 2009 Quarter-final	Thurles Sarsfields	1-18 - 0-18	Nenagh Éire Óg	Semple Stadium
	P Bourke 0-10, R Ruth 0-3, D Maher 1-0, A Kennedy 0-2, M Gleeson 0-1, S Ryan 0-1, L Corbett 0-1.		M Heffernan 0-6, K Tucker 0-5, P Murphy 0-3, R Flannery 0-2 E Tucker 0-1, T Heffernan 0-1.

26 September 2009 Quarter-final	Upperchurch–Drombane	3-23 - 3-17	Mullinahone	Semple Stadium
	P Greene 1-6, P Shortt 1-5, J Barry 0-4, C Ryan 0-3, O Shortt 1-0, LJ Ryan 0-2, J Brennan 0-2, C Stapleton 0-1.		E Kelly 1-9, S Curran 1-3, P Croke 1-0, E O'Meara 0-2, K Waltzer 0-1, A Maher 0-1, K Vaughan 0-1.

27 September 2009 Quarter-final	Drom & Inch	2-15 - 0-19	Borris–Ileigh	Semple Stadium
	S Callanan 1-9, D Butler 1-1, Johnny Ryan 0-3, J Kennedy 0-1, S Butler 0-1.		D O'Connor 0-6, M Maher 0-4, B Maher 0-2, V Stapleton 0-2, M Stapleton 0-2, M Bourke 0-1, J Keane 0-1, D Maher 0-1.

27 September 2009 Quarter-final	Toomevara	1-24 - 4-08	Clonoulty–Rossmore	Semple Stadium
	K Dunne 0-13, J O'Brien 1-3, F Devaney 0-2, J McLoughney 0-1, P Grace 0-1, T Dunne 0-1, M Bevans 0-1, B McCormack 0-1, J Duignan 0-1.		J O'Neill 2-0, T Hammersley 1-3, A Butler 1-0, P White 0-2, F O'Keeffe 0-2, Tom Butler 0-1.

=== Semi-finals ===
4 October 2009 Semi-final	Drom & Inch	0-19 - 1-12	Toomevara	Semple Stadium
	S Callanan 0-12, J Kennedy 0-2, S Butler 0-2, D Butler 0-1, Johnny Ryan 0-1, D Collins 0-1.		J O'Brien 1-3, K Dunne 0-3, W Ryan 0-2, M Bevan 0-1, J McLoughney 0-1, B Dunne 0-1, D Young 0-1.

4 October 2009 Semi-final	Thurles Sarsfields	2-17 - 0-10	Upperchurch–Drombane	Semple Stadium
	P Bourke 0-9, R Ruth 2-2, D Maher 0-3, D Kennedy 0-2, A Kennedy 0-1.		J Barry 0-3, P Shortt 0-3, C Stapleton 0-2, J Brennan 0-1, B Phelan 0-1.

=== Final ===
18 October 2009 Final	Thurles Sarsfields	0-14 - 0-05	Drom & Inch	Semple Stadium
	J Enright 0-5 (0-1 free); P Bourke 0-4 (0-2 frees); G O’Grady 0-2; R Ruth, D Maher, M Gleeson, 0-1 each.	Report	S Callanan 0-2 (0-1 free); Johnny Ryan 0-2 (0-1 free); J Kennedy 0-1.

== Championship statistics ==
=== Top scorers ===
Rank	Player	Club	Tally	Total	Matches	Average
1	Pa Bourke	Thurles Sarsfields	1-39	42	5	8.40
2	Ken Dunne	Toomevara	1-29	32	4	8.00
3	Séamus Callanan	Drom & Inch	1-23	26	3	8.66
4	David O'Connor	Borris–Ileigh	2-18	24	3	8.00
5	John O'Brien	Toomevara	4-08	20	4	5.00
6	Richie Ruth	Thurles Sarsfields	2-13	19	5	3.80
7	John O'Dwyer	Killenaule	1-14	17	2	8.50
8	Pádraig Greene	Upperchurch–Drombane	1-13	16	4	4.00
9	Pat Shortt	Upperchurch–Drombane	1-12	15	4	3.75
10	Eoin Kelly	Mullinahone	1-09	12	1	12.00
10	Jody Brennan	Upperchurch–Drombane	1-09	12	4	3.00
10	John Sheedy	Portroe	0-12	12	2	600
10	James Barry	Upperchurch–Drombane	0-12	12	4	3.00
