= Roger Ryan (hurler) =

Irish hurler

Personal information
- Native name: Ruairí Ó Riain (Irish)
- Born: 1945 Toomevara, County Tipperary, Ireland
- Died: 11 May 2009 (aged 65) Toomevara, County Tipperary, Ireland
- Occupation: Roscrea Foods employee
- Height: 6 ft 1 in (185 cm)

Sport
- Sport: Hurling
- Position: Full-forward
Clubs
- Years: Club
- 1962-1973 1974-1981: Toomevara; Roscrea
Club titles
- Tipperary titles: 1
Inter-county
Years	County	Apps (scores)
1969-1976	Tipperary	16 (6-02)
Inter-county titles
- Munster titles: 1
- All-Irelands: 1
- NHL: 0
- All Stars: 0

Roger P. Ryan (1944 - 11 May 2009) was an Irish hurler and selector. At club level he played with Toomevara and was also a member of the Tipperary senior hurling team.

== Playing career ==
Ryan first played hurling at juvenile and underage levels with the Toomevara club. He joined the club's senior team as a 17-year-old in 1962 and won a North Tipperary SHC in his first year with the team. Ryan never played at minor or under-21 levels with Tipperary, however, he joined the senior team during the 1969-70 National League. He was at full-forward when Tipperary beat Kilkenny in the 1971 All-Ireland final.

Ryan continued to line out with the Tipperary senior team until 1976. By this stage he had transferred clubs by joining Roscrea in 1974. Ryan won a Tipperary SHC in 1980 and served as team captain in his final season in 1981.

== Management career ==
Ryan became involved in coaching and team management immediately after his retirement from playing. He served as a selector with the Tipperary senior hurling team in 1977. Ryan was a selector and manager with the Toomevara senior team at various times between 1997 and 2006. During that time the club won five Tipperary SHC titles and the Munster Club Championship title in 2006.

== Death ==
Ryan died on 11 May 2009, aged 65. He was predeceased by his brother, Tom Ryan, who also lined out with Toomevara and Tipperary.

== Honours ==
=== Player ===
Toomevara

- North Tipperary Senior Hurling Championship: 1962

Roscrea

- Tipperary Senior Hurling Championship: 1980
- North Tipperary Senior Hurling Championship: 1980

Tipperary

- All-Ireland Senior Hurling Championship: 1971
- Munster Senior Hurling Championship: 1971

=== Management ===
Toomevara

- Munster Senior Club Hurling Championship: 2006
- Tipperary Senior Hurling Championship: 1998, 1999, 2000, 2001, 2006
- North Tipperary Senior Hurling Championship: 1997, 1999, 2000, 2002, 2006
