= George Frend =

Irish hurler (born 1970)

Personal information
- Born: 26 July 1970 (age 56) Toomevara, County Tipperary, Ireland
- Occupation: Primary school principal
- Height: 5 ft 10 in (178 cm)

Sport
- Sport: Hurling
- Position: Corner-back
Club
- Years: Club
- 1987-2003: Toomevara
Club titles
- Tipperary titles: 8
- Munster titles: 1
- All-Ireland Titles: 0
Inter-county
Years	County	Apps (scores)
1992-1999	Tipperary	7 (0-00)
Inter-county titles
- Munster titles: 1
- All-Irelands: 0
- NHL: 2
- All Stars: 0

George Frend (born 26 July 1970) is an Irish former hurler. At club level he played with Toomevara, and also lined out at inter-county level with various Tipperary teams.

== Career ==
Frend first played hurling at juvenile and underage levels with the Toomevara club, winning numerous championship titles from under-12 up to under-21 level. He later won three successive Tipperary SHC medals from 1992 to 1994. The second of these victories was later converted into a Munster Club SHC title, before later losing the 1994 All-Ireland club final to Sarsfields. Frend was later part of the Toomevara four-in-a-row team from 1998 to 2001. He claimed an eighth and final Tipperary SHC medal in 2003.

Frend first appeared on the inter-county scene for Tipperary as a member of the minor team in 1988. He immediately progressed to the under-21 team and was corner-back on the team that beat Offaly to win the All-Ireland U21HC title in 1989. He claimed a second successive Munster U21HC in 1990 and was team captain in 1991.

Following the end of his underage inter-county career, Frend was drafted onto the senior team and made his debut in 1992. He was team captain for the 1994 season and won a National League medal that season. Frend was a non-playing substitute when Tipperary were beaten by Clare in the 1997 All-Ireland final. His inter-county career ended in 1999, by which time he had won a second National League medal.

== Honours ==
Toomevara

- Munster Senior Club Hurling Championship: 1993
- Tipperary Senior Hurling Championship: 1992, 1993, 1994, 1998, 1999, 2000, 2001, 2003
- North Tipperary Senior Hurling Championship: 1991, 1994, 1995, 1997, 1999, 2000, 2002, 2003
- Tipperary Intermediate Hurling Championship: 1984
- Tipperary Under-21 A Hurling Championship: 1990
- Tipperary Minor A Hurling Championship: 1986, 1987

Tipperary

- Munster Senior Hurling Championship: 1993
- National Hurling League: 1993–94 (c), 1999
- All-Ireland Under-21 Hurling Championship: 1989
- Munster Under-21 Hurling Championship: 1989, 1990

Sporting positions
Preceded by John Leahy	Tipperary under-21 hurling team captains 1991	Succeeded by Timmy Moloney
Preceded by Tommy Dunne	Tipperary senior hurling team captains 1994	Succeeded by Michael Cleary
