= 2006 Tipperary Senior Hurling Championship =

Annual hurling competition season

The Tipperary Senior Hurling Championship is an annual club competition between the top Tipperary clubs. The winners of the Tipperary Championship qualify to represent their county in the Munster Club Championship, the winners of which go on to the All-Ireland Senior Club Hurling Championship.

The Tipperary County Champions in 2006 were Toomevara who became champions with a win over Nenagh Éire Óg. The Tipperary senior hurling championship is probably the most complicated system in Ireland as it strives to accommodate 25 teams. A knockout divisional system and group backdoor system has been introduced to accommodate these teams. Before the new system, the county championship was run on a divisional basis with the teams in the divisional finals going into the county quarter-finals and proceeding from there. It may not be long before this system is re-introduced because of the complexity of the current championship.

== 2006 Divisional Championship ==
=== North Tipperary ===
The North Tipperary Championship is contested by nine teams: Borris-Ileigh, Burgess, Kildangan, Kilruane McDonaghs, Moneygall, Nenagh Éire Óg, Portroe, Roscrea, Toomevara. The championship is a knockout competition with the losers apart from the semifinal runner-up entering the County Championship. The winners of the North Championship advance to the quarter-final of the County Championship.

Game	Date	Venue	Team A	Score	Team B	Score	Report
North Tipperary SHC; Preliminary round	7 May	Nenagh	Burgess	3-14	Kilruane McDonaghs	1-15	
North Tipperary SHC; Quarter-final	27 May	Nenagh	Toomevara	2-18	Burgess	3-10	
North Tipperary SHC; Quarter-final	27 May	Cloughjordan	Borris-Ileigh	0-17	Nenagh Eire Og	0-14	
North Tipperary SHC; Quarter-final	26 May	Nenagh	Kildangan	2-19	Moneygall	2-12	
North Tipperary SHC; Quarter-final	20 May	Toomevara	Roscrea	0-19	Portroe	1-9	
North Tipperary SHC; Semifinal	9 July	Cloughjordan	Toomevara	1-17	Borris-Ileigh	0-14	
North Tipperary SHC; Semifinal	2 July	Nenagh	Kildangan	2-13	Roscrea	1-7	
North Tipperary SHC; Final	30 July	Nenagh	Toomevara	1-15	Kildangan	0-12	

=== Mid Tipperary ===
The Mid Tipperary Championship is contested by seven teams: Boherlahan-Dualla, Drom-Inch, Holycross-Ballycahill, J.K. Bracken's, Loughmore-Castleiney, Thurles Sarsfields and Upperchurch-Drombane. The championship is a knockout competition with the losers apart from the one semifinal runner-up (Upperchurch-Drombane in 2006) entering the County Championship. The winners of the Mid Championship advance to the county quarter final. Drom-Inch receive a bye to the semifinal.

Game	Date	Venue	Team A	Score	Team B	Score	Report
Mid Tipperary SHC; Quarter-final	30 April	The Ragg	Loughmore-Castleiney	1-18	J.K. Bracken's	0-15	
Mid Tipperary SHC; Quarter-final	13 May	The Ragg	Boherlahan-Dualla	3-12	Holycross-Ballycahill	2-11	
Mid Tipperary SHC; Quarter-final	20 May	Boherlahan	Thurles Sarsfields	0-15	Upperchurch-Drombane	0-17	
North Tipperary SHC; Semifinal	14 June	Templemore	Drom-Inch	1-15	Loughmore-Castleiney	0-10	
Mid Tipperary SHC; Semifinal	18 June	Holycross	Boherlahan-Dualla	2-15	Upperchurch-Drombane	1-14	
Mid Tipperary SHC; Final	30 July	Holycross	Drom-Inch	3-13	Boherlahan-Dualla	0-16	

=== West Tipperary ===
The West Tipperary Championship is contested by five teams: Cappawhite, Cashel King Cormacs, Clonoulty-Rossmore, Éire Óg Annacarty and Knockavilla-Donaskeigh Kickhams. The championship is a knockout competition with the winners advancing to the quarter-final of the County Championship. The other four contestants also play in the first phase of the County Championship (group stage).

Game	Date	Venue	Team A	Score	Team B	Score	Report
West Tipperary SHC; Quarter-final	30 April	Cappawhite	Clonoulty-Rossmore	0-14	Cashel King Cormacs	0-7	
West Tipperary SHC; Semifinal	20 May	Tipperary Town	Knockavilla-Donaskeigh Kickhams	4-10	Galtee Rovers	0-11	
West Tipperary SHC; Semifinal	27 May	Dundrum	Clonoulty-Rossmore	3-12	Cappawhite	3-10	
West Tipperary SHC; Final	9 July	Golden	Knockavilla-Donaskeigh Kickhams	1-14	Clonoulty-Rossmore	0-12	

=== South Tipperary ===
The South Tipperary Championship is contested by four teams: Ballingarry, Carrick Swans, Killenaule and Mullinahone. The championship is a 'knockout' competition. However, the three semifinalists losers going into the County Championship. The winners of the South Championship advance directly to the quarter-final of the County championship, while the other three divisional semifinalists also play in the first phase of the County Championship (group stage).

Game	Date	Venue	Team A	Score	Team B	Score	Report
South Tipperary SHC; Semifinal	10 June	Clonmel	Mullinahone	0-20	Ballingarry	1-10	
South Tipperary SHC; Semifinal	28 May	Clonmel	Killenaule	3-13	Carrick Swans	1-8	
South Tipperary SHC; Final	30 July	Clonmel	Mullinahone	2-14	Killenaule	1-16	

== 2006 Tipperary County Championship ==
The 14 teams defeated in their divisional championship are divided into groups of 4 with the winner of each group going into the next round. The teams that finish bottom in these groups go through to the relegation playoffs.

=== Group 1 ===
Date	Venue	Team A	Score	Team B	Score	Report
30 June	Boherlahan	Thurles Sarsfields	4-13	Cashel King Cormacs	1-14	
14 July	Nenagh	Thurles Sarsfields	1-18	Burgess	3-15	
30 July	Templemore	Burgess	5-19	Cashel King Cormacs	3-10	

Team	P	W	D	L	F	A	Pts.	Score Dif.
Burgess	2	2	0	0	8-34	4-28	4	+18
Thurles Sarsfields	2	1	0	1	5-31	4-29	2	+5
Cashel King Cormacs	2	0	0	2	4-24	9-32	0	-23

=== Group 2 ===
Date	Venue	Team A	Score	Team B	Score	Report
30 June	Cashel	Ballingarry	2-15	Holycross-Ballycahill	2-15	
3 July	The Ragg	Nenagh Eire Og	1-13	Galtee Rovers	1-7	
9 July	Cashel	Ballingarry	0-16	Galtee Rovers	1-10	
14 July	Templemore	Nenagh Eire Og	1-17	Holycross-Ballycahill	1-11	
26 July	Cashel	Holycross-Ballycahill	2-18	Galtee Rovers	2-13	
28 July	Holycross	Nenagh Eire Og	3-18	Ballingarry	4-15	

Team	P	W	D	L	F	A	Pts.	Score Dif.
Nenagh Eire Og	3	2	1	0	5-48	6-33	5	+12
Ballingarry	3	1	2	0	6-46	6-43	4	+3
Holycross-Ballycahill	3	1	1	1	5-44	5-45	3	-1
Galtee Rovers	3	0	0	3	4-30	3-47	0	-14

=== Group 3 ===
Date	Venue	Team A	Score	Team B	Score	Report
2 July	Dolla	Kilruane McDonaghs	1-16	Portroe	1-13	
8 July	Toomevara	Loughmore-Castleiney	1-16	Portroe	2-9	
1 August	Moneygall	Loughmore-Castleiney	3-16	Kilruna McDonaghs	2-10	

Team	P	W	D	L	F	A	Pts.	Score Dif.
Loughmore-Castleiney	2	2	0	0	4-32	4-19	4	+13
Kilrune McDonaghs	2	1	0	1	3-26	4-29	2	-6
Portroe	2	0	0	2	3-22	2-32	0	-7

=== Group 4 ===
Date	Venue	Team A	Score	Team B	Score	Report
30 June	Littleton	Moneygall	1-20	Carrick Swans	2-13	
3 July	Drombane	Cappawhite	0-10	J.K. Bracken's	1-14	
8 July	The Ragg	Moneygall	1-9	Cappawhite	0-8	
9 July	Fethard	J.K. Bracken's	2-16	Carrick Swans	2-10	
29 July	Clonmel	Cappawhite	0-18	Carrick Swans	1-11	
2 August	Roscrea	Moneygall	4-11	J.K. Bracken's	2-10	

Team	P	W	D	L	F	A	Pts.	Score Dif.
Moneygall	3	3	0	0	6-40	4-31	6	+15
J.K. Bracken's	3	2	0	1	5-40	6-31	4	+6
Cappawhite	3	1	0	2	0-36	3-34	2	-7
Carrick Swans	3	0	0	3	5-34	3-54	0	-14

== Relegation ==
The bottom teams in the groups fight out relegation playoffs with the loser going to intermediate status next year. The four teams are Portroe, Galtee Rovers, Carrick Swans and Cashel King Cormacs.

Game	Date	Venue	Team A	Score	Team B	Score	Report
Relegation Semifinal	12 August	The Ragg	Portroe	3-12	Cashel King Cormacs	0-13	
Relegation Semifinal	12 August	Cashel	Carrick Swans	2-8	Galtee Rovers	0-7	
Relegation Final	26 August	Golden	Cashel King Cormacs	1-12	Galtee Rovers	0-9	

Galtee Rovers are relegated to intermediate status.

== Round 2 ==
In this round the three defeated divisional semifinalists not in the group stages namely Roscrea, Borris-Ileigh, Upperchurch-Drombane meet the group winners namely Burgess, Loughmore-Castleiney, Nenagh Éire Óg and Nenagh Éire Óg received a bye to round 3.In round 3 the winners of round 2 will meet the divisional runners-up.

Date	Venue	Team A	Score	Team B	Score	Report
5 August	Dolla	Burgess	0-16	Borris-Ileigh	2-12	
6 August	Templemore	Loughmore-Castleliney	1-10	Roscrea	0-8	
12 August AET	Dolla	Moneygall	2-19	Upperchurch-Drombane	2-19	
20 August	Templemore	Moneygall	4-10	Upperchurch-Drombane	2-8	

== Round 3 ==
In this round the four defeated divisional finalists not in the group stages namely Kildangan, Boherlahan-Dualla, Clonoulty-Rossmore and Killenaule meet the winners of round 2.Nenagh Éire Óg received a bye to this round.

Date	Venue	Team A	Score	Team B	Score	Report
26 August	Nenagh	Kildangan	0-16	Moneygall	0-15	
27 August	The Ragg	Boherlahan-Dualla	2-8	Loughmore-Castleliney	2-18	
27 August	The Ragg	Clonoulty-Rossmore	1-6	Borris-Ileigh	3-17	
27 August	Templemore	Killenaule	2-14	Nenagh Eire Og	2-15	

== Quarter-finals ==
In this round the four divisional winners namely Toomevara, Drom-Inch, Mullinahone and Knockavilla-Donaskeigh Kickhams meet the winners of round 3.

Game	Date	Venue	Team A	Score	Team B	Score	Report
Quarter-final	23 September	Templemore	Knockavilla-Donaskeigh Kickhams	1-11	Nenagh Eire Og	1-17	
Quarter-final	23 September	Templemore	Mullinahone	1-14	Kildangan	1-12	
Quarter-final	24 September	Nenagh	Toomevara	2-17	Loughmore-Castleiney	2-14	
Quarter-final	24 September	Nenagh	Drom-Inch	2-9	Borris-Ileigh	1-11	

== Semifinals ==
Game	Date	Venue	Team A	Score	Team B	Score	Report
Semifinal	8 October	Semple Stadium	Drom-Inch	1-13	Nenagh Eire Og	2-14	
Semifinal	8 October	Semple Stadium	Toomevara	3-10	Mullinahone	0-18	

== Final ==
Game	Date	Venue	Team A	Score	Team B	Score	Report Report
Final	22 October	Semple Stadium	Toomevara	1-21	Nenagh Eire Og	2-14	
