= 2004 Tipperary Senior Hurling Championship =

Annual hurling competition season

- Dates: 5 September – 10 October 2004
- Teams: 7
- Sponsor: Cidona
- Champions: Toomevara (19th title); Paddy O'Brien (captain); Seán Hehir (manager)
- Runners-up: Éire Óg/Golden; Pat Heffernan (manager)

Tournament statistics
- Matches played: 6
- Goals scored: 20 (3.33 per match)
- Points scored: 167 (27.83 per match)
- Top scorer(s): Ken Dunne (0–17)

The 2004 Tipperary Senior Hurling Championship was the 113th staging of the Tipperary Senior Hurling Championship since its establishment by the Tipperary County Board in 1887. The championship ran from 5 September to 10 October 2004.

Toomevara were the defending champions.

The final was played on 10 October 2004 at Semple Stadium in Thurles, between Toomevara and first-time finalists Éire Óg/Golden. Toomevara won the match by 4–12 to 2–12 to claim their 19th championship title overall and a second consecutive title.

Toomevara's Ken Dunne was the championship's top scorer with 0–17.

== Results ==
=== Quarter-finals ===
5 September 2004 Quarter-final	Éire Óg/Golden	1-15 - 1-14	Drom & Inch	Leahy Park
	David Fogarty 0-5, S Stapleton 1-1, R O'Brien 0-3, Daithí Fogarty 0-2, J Quinn 0-1, J McCarthy 0-1, A Fogarty 0-1, D O'Brien 0-1.		S Butler 1-8, M Butler 0-4, P Kennedy 0-1, P Butler 0-1.

5 September 2004 Quarter-final	Roscrea	1-18 - 0-13	Holycross–Ballycahill	Páirc Shíleáin
	T Fitzgerald 1-4, M Ryan 0-5, P Carroll 0-4, J Carroll 0-2, S Lee 0-1, D Moloney 0-1, L England 0-1.		J Ferncombe 0-5, J Butler 0-3, R Stakelum 0-2, D Burke 0-1, T Fogarty 0-1, S Lanigan 0-1.

21 September 2004 Quarter-final	Toomevara	1-12 - 0-13	Loughmore–Castleiney	Páirc Shíleáin
	K Dunne 0-4, F Devanney 1-0, W Ryan 0-2, M Bevans 0-2, P O'Brien 0-1, E Brislane 0-1, Tommy Dunne 0-1, K Cummins 0-1.		N Morris 0-8, E Sweeney 0-1, M Webster 0-1, M Gleeson 0-1, D Kennedy 0-1, S Bohan 0-1.

- Mullinahone received a bye in this round.

=== Semi-finals ===
26 September 2004 Semi-final	Éire Óg/Golden	2-17 - 4-08	Roscrea	Semple Stadium
	J Quinn 2-1, David Fogarty 0-6, D O'Brien 0-3, R O'Brien 0-3, A Fogarty 0-2, S Stapleton 0-2.		D Hogan 1-3, M Ryan 1-1, J Carroll 1-1, D Fitzgerald 1-0, T Fitzgerald 0-2, P Carroll 0-1.

26 September 2004 Semi-final	Toomevara	2-19 - 2-14	Mullinahone	Semple Stadium
	K Dunne 0-10, W Rayn 1-2, P O'Brien 0-3, Tommy Dunne 0-3, F Devanney 1-0, M Bevans 0-1.		E Kelly 2-8, E Carey 0-3, P Kelly 0-2, J Leahy 0-1.

=== Final ===
10 October 2004 Final	Toomevara	4-12 - 2-12	Éire Óg/Golden	Semple Stadium
	P O'Brien 2-2, Tommy Dunne 1-2, E Brislane 1-2, K Dunne 0-3, B Dunne 0-1, M Bevans 0-1, F Devaney 0-1.		J Quinn 2-1, David Fogarty 0-3, J McCarthy 0-2, R o'Brien 0-2, D O'Brien 0-2, A Fogarty 0-1, Daithí Fogarty 0-1.

== Championship statistics ==
=== Top scorers ===
Rank	Player	Club	Tally	Total	Matches	Average
1	Ken Dunne	Toomevara	0-17	17	3	5.66
2	John Quinn	Éire Óg/Golden	4-03	15	3	5.00
3	Eoin Kelly	Mullinahone	2-08	14	1	14.00
3	David Fogarty	Éire Óg/Golden	0-14	14	3	4.66
5	Paddy O'Brien	Toomevara	2-06	12	3	4.00
6	Séamus Butler	Drom & Inch	1-08	11	1	11.00
7	Tommy Fitzgerald	Roscrea	1-06	9	2	4.50
7	Mark Ryan	Roscrea	1-06	9	2	4.50
7	Tommy Dunne	Toomevara	1-06	9	3	3.00
10	Noel Morris	Loughmore–Castleiney	0-08	8	1	8.00
10	Ronan O'Brien	Éire Óg/Golden	0-08	8	3	2.66
