= 2001 Tipperary Senior Hurling Championship =

Annual hurling competition season

- Dates: 14 October – 11 November 2001
- Teams: 8
- Sponsor: Credit Unions Tipperary
- Champions: Toomevara (17th title); Justin Cottrell (captain); Seán Stack (manager)
- Runners-up: Thurles Sarsfields; Johnny Enright (captain); Paddy Doyle (manager)

Tournament statistics
- Matches played: 8
- Goals scored: 26 (3.25 per match)
- Points scored: 254 (31.75 per match)
- Top scorer(s): Johnny Enright (1-25)

The 2001 Tipperary Senior Hurling Championship was the 110th staging of the Tipperary Senior Hurling Championship since its establishment by the Tipperary County Board in 1887. The championship ran from 14 October to 11 November 2001.

Toomevara were the defending champions.

On 11 November 2001, Toomevara won the title after a 1–22 to 1–13 defeat of Thurles Sarsfields in the final at Semple Stadium. It was their 17th championship title overall and their fourth title in succession.

== Results ==
=== Quarter-finals ===
| 14 October 2001 Quarter-final | Thurles Sarsfields | 2-16 - 1-12 | Ballingarry | Leahy Park |
| | J Enright 0-11, L Corbett 1-1, J Lawlor 1-0, G O'Grady 0-2, P Lawlor 0-1, T Ruth 0-1. | | A Cleere 1-3, L Cahill 0-3, P Ivors 0-3, W Maher 0-1, D Shelly 0-1, D Lyons 0-1. |

| 14 October 2001 Quarter-final | Toomevara | 2-16 - 2-16 | Loughmore-Castleiney | Páirc Shíleáin |
| | P McGrath 1-2, K Dunne 0-4, Tommy Dunne 0-4, J O'Brien 0-4, M Bevans 1-0, F Devaney 0-1, P O'Brien 0-1. | | N Morris 0-7, P Ormonde 1-2, S Bohan 1-2, P McGrath 0-2, M Gleeson 0-2, M Webster 0-1. |

| 14 October 2001 Quarter-final | Cappawhite | 2-15 - 1-13 | Mullinahone | Semple Stadium |
| | E O'Neill 0-9, S Ryan 1-2, J Ryan 1-0, A O'Neill 0-2, P Julian 0-2. | | E Kelly 0-7, P Kelly 1-0, B O'Meara 0-2, E Carey 0-2, P Croke 0-2. |

| 14 October 2001 Quarter-final | Clonoulty-Rossmore | 4-20 - 3-18 | Nenagh Éire Óg | Semple Stadium |
| | D Ryan 3-4, D Quirke 0-7, A Kennedy 1-2, M Quirke 0-4, A Butler 0-1, T Butler 0-1, R Martin 0-1. | | D O'Meara 2-2, M Cleary 1-4, K Tucker 0-5, E Tucker 0-3, M Hackett 0-2, R Tomlinson 0-1, J Kennedy 0-1. |

| 29 October 2001 Quarter-final replay | Toomevara | 1-16 - 0-16 | Loughmore-Castleiney | Páirc Shíleáin |
| | Tommy Dunne 0-7, K Dunne 0-6, K Hall 1-0, M Bevans 0-2, J O'Brien 0-1. | | N Morris 0-8, M Webster 0-2, P McGrath 0-2, D Laffan 0-2, P Ormonde 0-1, T Ormonde 0-1. |

=== Semi-finals ===
| 28 October 2001 Semi-final | Thurles Sarsfields | 3-25 - 0-10 | Cappawhite | Semple Stadium |
| | T Ruth 2-2, M O'Dowd 1-3, J Enright 0-5, G O'Grady 0-5, L Corbett 0-5, P Lawlor 0-4, C McIntyre 0-1. | | E O'Neill 0-6, P O'Neill 0-2, F Quinn 0-1, G Quinlan 0-1. |

| 4 November 2001 Semi-final | Toomevara | 2-14 - 1-12 | Clonoulty-Rossmore | Semple Stadium |
| | M Bevans 1-2, F Devaney 1-1, K Dunne 0-4, Tommy Dunne 0-4, J O'Brien 0-2, E Brislane 0-1. | | D Ryan 1-4, D Quirke 0-4, M Heffernan 0-1, M Quirke 0-1, M Brennan 0-1, A Butler 0-1. |

=== Final ===
| 11 November 2001 Final | Toomevara | 1-22 - 1-13 | Thurles Sarsfields | Semple Stadium |
| | J O'Brien 1-5, K Dunne 0-7 (6f), Thomas Dunne 0-4 (1f, 1 line ball), Terry Dunne 0-2, P McGrath, M Bevans, T Delaney, P Hackett 0-1 each. | Report | J Enright 1-9 (1-8f), M O'Dowd 0-2, T Ruth, B Carroll 0-1 each. | Referee: S Roche |

== Championship statistics ==
=== Top scorers ===
Top scorers overall

| Rank | Player | Club | Tally | Total | Matches | Average |
|---|---|---|---|---|---|---|
| 1 | Johnny Enright | Thurles Sarsfields | 1-25 | 28 | 3 | 9.33 |
| 2 | Ken Dunne | Toomevara | 0-21 | 21 | 4 | 5.25 |
| 3 | Declan Ryan | Clonoulty-Rossmore | 4-08 | 20 | 2 | 10.00 |
| 4 | Tommy Dunne | Toomevara | 0-10 | 19 | 4 | 4.75 |
| 5 | John O'Brien | Toomevara | 1-12 | 15 | 4 | 3.75 |
| 5 | Eugene O'Neill | Cappawhite | 0-15 | 15 | 2 | 7.50 |
| 5 | Noel Morris | Loughmore-Castleiney | 0-15 | 15 | 2 | 7.50 |
| 8 | Michael Bevans | Toomevara | 2-05 | 11 | 4 | 2.75 |
| 8 | Dan Quirke | Clonoulty-Rossmore | 0-11 | 11 | 2 | 5.50 |
| 10 | Tony Ruth | Thurles Sarsfields | 2-04 | 10 | 3 | 3.33 |

Top scorers in a single game

| Rank | Player | Club | Tally | Total | Opposition |
|---|---|---|---|---|---|
| 1 | Declan Ryan | Clonoulty-Rossmore | 3-04 | 13 | Nenagh Éire Óg |
| 2 | Johnny Enright | Thurles Sarsfields | 1-09 | 12 | Toomevara |
| 3 | Johnny Enright | Thurles Sarsfields | 0-11 | 11 | Ballingarry |
| 4 | Eugene O'Neill | Cappawhite | 0-09 | 9 | Mullinahone |
| 5 | Declan O'Meara | Nenagh Éire Óg | 2-02 | 8 | Clonoulty-Rossmore |
| 5 | Tony Ruth | Thurles Sarsfields | 2-02 | 8 | Cappawhite |
| 5 | John O'Brien | Toomevara | 1-05 | 8 | Thurles Sarsfields |
| 5 | Noel Morris | Loughmore-Castleiney | 0-08 | 8 | Toomevara |
| 9 | Michael Cleary | Nenagh Éire Óg | 1-04 | 7 | Clonoulty-Rossmore |
| 9 | Declan Ryan | Clonoulty-Rossmore | 1-04 | 7 | Toomevara |
| 9 | Noel Morris | Loughmore-Castleiney | 0-07 | 7 | Toomevara |
| 9 | Eoin Kelly | Mullinahone | 0-07 | 7 | Cappawhite |
| 9 | Dan Quirke | Clonoulty-Rossmore | 0-07 | 7 | Nenagh Éire Óg |
| 9 | Tommy Dunne | Toomevara | 0-07 | 7 | Loughmore-Castleiney |
| 9 | Ken Dunne | Toomevara | 0-07 | 7 | Thurles Sarsfields |

=== Miscellaneous ===
- Toomevara become the first team to win four in a row since Thurles Sarsfields between 1961 and 1964.
- Loughmore-Castleiney was thrown out of the championship for refusing to play extra time in their drawn quarter-final against Toomevara. A successful appeal to the Munster Council allowed the club to be subsequently reinstated.
