= 2008 Tipperary Senior Hurling Championship =

Annual hurling competition season

2008 Tippearry Senior Hurling Championship
- Dates: 13 September – 19 October 2008
- Teams: 16
- Champions: Toomevara (22nd title); Michael Bevans (captain); Vincent McKenna (manager)
- Runners-up: Thurles Sarsfields; Stephen Lillis (captain); Michael Gleeson (manager)

Tournament statistics
- Matches played: 16
- Goals scored: 43 (2.69 per match)
- Points scored: 491 (30.69 per match)
- Top scorer(s): Timmy Hammersley (2–35)

The 2008 Tipperary Senior Hurling Championship was the 117th staging of the Tipperary Senior Hurling Championship since its establishment by the Tipperary County Board in 1887. The championship ran from 13 September to 19 October 2008.

Loughmore-Castleiney were the defending champions, however, they were beaten by Toomevara in the semi-finals.

The final was played on 19 October 2008 at Semple Stadium in Thurles, between Toomevara and Thurles Sarsfields, in what was their ninth meeting in the final overall. Toomevara won the match by 2–14 to 0–17 to claim their 22nd championship title overall and a first title in two years.

Clonoulty–Rossmore's Timmy Hammersley was the championship's top scorer with 2–35.

== Format ==
All the teams that reached the divisional semi-finals qualified for the county championship. The eight teams that made the divisional finals were protected by being put in one side of the draw while the defeated semi-finalists were put in the other.

== Results ==
=== First round ===
13 September 2008 First round	Cappawhite	1-17 - 0-16	Éire Óg Annacarty	Páirc Ciocaim
	D Ryan 1-2, A O'Neill 0-5, G O'Neill 0-4, J Bradshaw 0-3, P Fitzgerald 0-2, E O'neill 0-1.		R O'Brien 0-7, D O'brien 0-4, M McGrath 0-2, J Quinn 0-2, P McLoughlin 0-2.

13 September 2008 First round	Loughmore-Castleiney	2-13 - 2-10	Killenaule	Leahy Park
	E Sweeney 0-7, E Connolly 1-1, M Webster 1-0, N McGrath 0-4, J Egan 0-1.		J O'Dwyer 0-5, N O'Dwyer 1-1, M O'Donnell 1-0, P Kerwick 0-2, J Gleeson 0-1, P Blake 0-1.

20 September 2008 First round	Drom-Inch	1-15 - 1-10	Ballybacon-Grange	Páirc Ciocaim
	J Ryan 0-8, E Woodlock 1-0, S Callanan 0-2, S Butler 0-2, M Cantwell 0-1, Martin Butler 0-1, J Woodlock 0-1.		J English 0-7, B Cummins 1-1, D Walsh 0-2.

20 September 2008 First round	Clonoulty-Rossmore	1-14 - 0-12	Roscrea	The Ragg
	T Hammersley 1-7, John O'Neill 0-2, C Ryan 0-1, A Butler 0-1, Tom Butler 0-1, F O'Keeffe 0-1, Thomas Butler 0-1.		L England 0-3, D O'Connor 0-3, M Ryan 0-2, T Fitzgerald 0-2, T Fletcher 0-1, A Ryan 0-1.

20 September 2008 First round	Kildangan	2-14 - 0-19	Moycarkey-Borris	The Ragg
	S Kelly 2-2, D Egan 0-7, J Gallagher 0-2, R Gleeson 0-2, S Gleeson 0-1.		K Morris 0-11, R Doran 0-2, C Ryan 0-1, N Bergin 0-1, A Healy 0-1, W Dempsey 0-1, J Dixon 0-1, P Molloy 0-1.

20 September 2008 First round	Thurles Sarsfields	6-16 - 2-12	Golden-Kilfeacle	Páirc Ciocaim
	S Ryan 2-3, P Bourke 1-6, J Corbett 2-0, P Maher 1-0, W Culley 0-3, G O'Grady 0-2, L Cahill 0-1, D Dwyer 0-1.		M Harding 1-6, J McCarthy 0-5, S Carr 1-0, S Stapleton 0-1.

21 September 2008 First round	Mullinahone	3-15 - 2-14	Ballingarry	Barracks Field
	E Kelly 1-8, S Curran 2-0, E O'Brien 0-2, K Bolger 0-2, P Croke 0-1, D Coady 0-1, K Walzer 0-1.		S Cahill 0-6, D Shelly 1-2, D Lyons 1-0, J Holohan 0-2, P Ivors 0-2, T Ivors 0-1, C Shelly 0-1.

21 September 2008 First round	Toomevara	1-14 - 1-12	Burgess	MacDonagh Park
	K Dunne 1-5, J O'Brien 0-3, W Ryan 0-2, E Brislane 0-2.		T Scroope 0-10, K Nealon 1-0, S Maher 0-1, Donagh Maher 0-1.

=== Quarter-finals ===
27 September 2008 Quarter-final	Clonoulty-Rossmore	1-15 - 0-17	Mullinahone	Semple Stadium
	T Hammersley 0-6, Tom Butler 0-6, A Butler 1-0, John O'Keeffe 0-1, J Forrestal 0-1, F O'Keeffe 0-1.		E Kelly 0-10, E Carey 0-5, K Bolger 0-1, S Curran 0-1.

27 September 2008 Quarter-final	Loughmore-Castleiney	2-19 - 2-14	Cappawhite	Semple Stadium
	E Sweeney 0-9, E Connolly 1-2, M Webster 1-1, G Sweeney 0-2, M Gleeson 0-2, C McGrath 0-1, N McGrath 0-1, D McGrath 0-1.		A O'Neill 1-8, P Fitzgerald 1-0, E O'Neill 0-3, T Treacy 0-1, J Bradshaw 0-1, G O'Neill 0-1.

28 September 2008 Quarter-final	Toomevara	1-22 - 1-13	Kildangan	Semple Stadium
	K Dunne 0-12, M Bevans 0-3, J O'Brien 0-3, W Ryan 1-0, P O'Brien 0-2, D Devaney 0-1, J Delaney 0-1.		D Egan 0-6, J Gallagher 0-3, E Gleeson 1-0, S Kelly 0-2, G Slattery 0-1, E Kelly 0-1.

28 September 2008 Quarter-final	Thurles Sarsfields	3-15 - 2-09	Drom-Inch	Semple Stadium
	P Bourke 2-7, J Corbett 1-1, G O'Grady 0-2, W Culley 0-1, S Ryan 0-1, L Corbett 0-1, T Ruth 0-1, S Lillis 0-1.		S Callanan 1-1, Johnny Ryan 0-4, M Cantwell 1-0, S Butler 0-2, Matthew Ryan 0-1, D Ryan 0-1.

=== Semi-finals ===
5 October 2008 Semi-final	Toomevara	0-17 - 0-13	Loughmore-Castleiney	Semple Stadium
	K Dunne 0-7 (0-4 frees 0-2 65’s); W Ryan 0-4; J O’Brien 0-2; M Bevans, E Brislane, P O’Brien, F Devanney, 0-1 each.	Report	E Sweeney 0-7 (0-3 frees); N McGrath 0-3 (0-2 frees); E Connolly, D McGrath, T King, 0-1 each.

5 October 2008 Semi-final	Thurles Sarsfields	1-14 - 0-17	Clonoulty-Rossmore	Semple Stadium
	P Bourke 1-8 (1-6 frees); S Ryan 0-2; L Corbett 0-2; W Cully, R Ruth, 0-1 each.	Report	T Hammersley 0-11 (0-7 frees 0-2 65’s); John O’Neill 0-3; J Devane, Thomas Butler, A Butler, 0-1 each.

12 October 2008 Semi-final replay	Thurles Sarsfields	2-22 - 1-20 (aet)	Clonoulty-Rossmore	Semple Stadium
	P Bourke 0-7, L Corbett 1-3, J Enright 0-5, J Corbett 1-0, R Ruth 0-3, L Cahill 0-1, S Lillis 0-1, W Culley 0-1, S Ryan 0-1.	Report	T Hammersley 1-11, A Butler 0-2, C Ryan 0-1, J Devane 0-1, Tom Butler 0-1, Thomas Butler 0-1, F O'Keeffe 0-1, John O'Neill 0-1, P White 0-1.

=== Final ===
19 October 2008 Final	Toomevara	2-14 - 0-17	Thurles Sarsfields	Semple Stadium
	E Brislane 1-5; K Dunne 0-4 (3f); W Ryan 1-0; F Devaney 0-2; T Dunne, J McLoughney (f), P O’Brien (side line) 0-1 each.	Report	J Enright 0-13 (5f, 0-2 65s); R Ruth 0-2; L Corbett, G O’Grady 0-1 each.	Referee: N Cosgrove (Marlfield)

== Championship statistics ==
=== Top scorers ===
Rank	Player	Club	Tally	Total	Matches	Average
1	Timmy Hammersley	Clonoulty–Rossmore	2-35	41	4	10.25
2	Pa Bourke	Thurles Sarsfields	4-28	40	5	8.00
3	Ken Dunne	Toomevara	1-28	31	4	7.75
4	Evan Sweeney	Loughmore–Castleiney	0-23	23	3	7.66
5	Eoin Kelly	Mullinahone	1-18	21	2	10.50
6	Johnny Enright	Thurles Sarsfields	0-18	18	3	6.00
7	Alan O'Neill	Cappawhite	1-13	16	2	8.00
8	John Corbett	Thurles Sarsfields	4-01	13	5	2.60
8	Shane Ryan	Thurles Sarsfields	2-07	13	5	2.60
8	Darragh Egan	Kiladangan	0-13	13	2	6.50
