= Matt O'Gara =

Irish hurler

Personal information
- Born: Toomevara, County Tipperary

Sport
- Football Position: Midfield
- Hurling Position: Midfield & Wing-Back
Club
- Years: Club
- Toomevara
Club titles
| | Football | Hurling |
| Tipperary titles | 3 | 1 |
Inter-county
- Years: County
- 1960s: Tipperary
Inter-county titles
| | Football | Hurling |
| Munster Titles | 0 | 2 |
| All-Ireland Titles | 0 | 2 |

Matt O'Gara is a former hurler from Toomevara, County Tipperary, Ireland. He played his hurling with his local club Toomevara, and Tipperary as midfield and wing back. He won a senior county title in hurling in 1960 and three senior titles in football in 1958, 1959 and 1960.

== Playing career ==
=== Inter-county ===
O'Gara first came to prominence on the inter-county scene as a member of the Tipperary minor hurling team in 1955. That team defeated Galway in the minor hurling final in Croke Park. O'Gara came on as a substitute for Joe Small of Borrisoleigh.

O'Gara's performances at this level brought him to the attention of the senior team. In 1961 it was National League medal number one and Munster medal number one for O'Gara. In the subsequent All-Ireland final Tipperary faced Dublin. O'Gara contributed two points and Tipperary won by a single point. So, 1961 saw O'Gara capture his first All-Ireland senior hurling medal.

In 1962 O'Gara captured a second provincial medal. In the subsequent All-Ireland final against Wexford, O'Gara lined out at wing-back for Tipperary and collected his second All-Ireland medal. O'Gara retired in 1963 following an injury during a hurling match in Boherlahan, County Tipperary. He went on to serve as the final station master at the Nenagh railway station until the early 2000s.

=== Provincial ===
O'Gara was voted best new rookie in 1961 and narrowly failed to be selected on the Railway Cup team.

== Honours ==
- All-Ireland Senior Hurling Championship: 2
  - 1961, 1962
- All-Ireland Minor Hurling Championship: 1
  - 1955
- Tipperary Senior Hurling Championship: 1
  - 1960
- Tipperary Senior Football Championship: 3
  - 1958, 1959, 1960
