= Tom Wall =

Tom Wall may refer to:

- Tom Wall (artist) (1941–1992), British landscape painter and educator
- Tom Wall (hurler) (1914–2005), Irish hurler

== See also ==
- Thomas Wall (disambiguation)
