= Tom Wall (hurler) =

Irish hurler

Personal information
- Native name: Tomás de Bhál (Irish)
- Born: 19 August 1914 Carrick-on-Suir, County Tipperary, Ireland
- Died: 15 April 2005 (aged 90) Carrick-on-Suir, County Tipperary, Ireland

Sport
- Sport: Hurling
- Position: Midfield
Club
- Years: Club
- Carrick Swans
Club titles
- Tipperary titles: 1
Inter-county
- Years: County
- 1936–1948: Tipperary
Inter-county titles
- Munster titles: 1
- All-Irelands: 1
- NHL: 0

Thomas Wall (19 August 1914 – 15 April 2005) was an Irish hurler who played as a midfielder for the Tipperary senior team.

Born in Carrick-on-Suir, County Tipperary, Wall first arrived on the inter-county scene when he first linked up with the Tipperary senior team before later joining the junior Gaelic football team. He made his senior debut during the 1936 championship. Wall enjoyed a sporadic career with Tipperary and won one All-Ireland medal and one Munster medal.

At club level Wall was a one-time championship medalist with Carrick Swans.

His brother, Willie, also won an All-Ireland medal with Tipperary.

== Honours ==
=== Team ===
Carrick Swans

- Tipperary Senior Hurling Championship (1): 1947

Tipperary

- All-Ireland Senior Hurling Championship (1): 1945
- Munster Senior Hurling Championship (1): 1945
