= Gerry Kennedy =

Irish hurler

Personal information
- Native name: Gearóid Ó Cinnéide (Irish)
- Born: 16 December 1985 (age 40) Killenaule, County Tipperary

Sport
- Sport: Hurling
- Position: Goalkeeper
Club
- Years: Club
- Killenaule
Inter-county
Years	County	Apps (scores)
2007-2009	Tipperary	6 (0-0)
Inter-county titles
- Munster titles: 2

Gerry Kennedy (born 16 December 1985 in Killenaule, County Tipperary) is an Irish sportsperson. He played hurling with his local club Killenaule and with the Tipperary senior inter-county team.

== Club ==
Kennedy plays his club hurling with his local Killenaule club and has enjoyed some success. Kennedy helped the club to win back-to-back county under-21 titles in 2003 and 2004 and he also won a South Senior Hurling medal with the club in 2005. He has yet to win a senior county title.

== Inter-county ==
Kennedy first came to inter-county prominence as a member of the Tipperray under-21 team. He won a Munster title in 2004 as a member of the panel and took over as the goalkeeper in 2006. He won a second Munster title that year, however, Kilkenny defeated Tipp in the replay of the All-Ireland final. Kennedy made his senior debut for Tipperary in the 2007 National Hurling League game against Antrim. He made his championship debut in the first replay against Limerick in the 2007 Munster Senior Hurling semi-final, following Brendan Cummins's surprise demotion as the first-choice goalkeeper.
