= 1999 Tipperary Senior Hurling Championship =

Annual hurling competition season

- Dates: 28 August – 10 October 1999
- Teams: 8
- Sponsor: Nenagh Co-Op
- Champions: Toomevara (15th title); Tommy Dunne (captain); Tom Ryan (manager)
- Runners-up: Nenagh Éire Óg; Con Howard (captain); Liam Heffernan (manager)

Tournament statistics
- Matches played: 8
- Goals scored: 29 (3.63 per match)
- Points scored: 213 (26.63 per match)
- Top scorer(s): Tommy Dunne (3-23)

The 1999 Tipperary Senior Hurling Championship was the 108th staging of the Tipperary Senior Hurling Championship since its establishment by the Tipperary County Board in 1887. The championship began on 28 August 1999 and ended on 10 October 1999.

Toomevara were the defending champions.

On 10 October 1999, Toomevara won the championship after a 1–17 to 0–13 defeat of Nenagh Éire Óg in the final at Semple Stadium. It was their 15th championship title overall and their second title in succession.

== Results ==
=== Quarter-finals ===
28 August 1999 Quarter-final	Toomevara	6-23 - 1-04	Éire Óg Annacarty	Páirc Shíleáin
	Tommy Dunne 2-7, M O'Meara 2-3, P McGrath 1-4, Terry Dunne 1-1, T Carroll 0-3, B Duff 0-2, T Delaney 0-1, E Brislane 0-1, P King 0-1.		B Ryan 1-0, P McLoughlin 0-2, K Fox 0-1, A Crosse 0-1.

29 August 1999 Quarter-final	Holycross-Ballycahill	0-14 - 1-11	Carrick Swans	Leahy Park
	J Ferncombe 0-7, D Duggan 0-2, T Lanigan 0-2, D Quinlan 0-1, D Ryan 0-1, D Burke 0-1.		A Ryan 1-1, R Dunne 0-4, M O'Halloran 0-2, B Ryan 0-2, J Grace 0-1, P Lukeman 0-1.

18 September 1999 Quarter-final	Nenagh Éire Óg	1-14 - 2-07	Kickhams	Páirc Shíleáin
	K Tucker 0-5, J Slattery 1-1, E Tucker 0-3, M Cleary 0-2, D O'Meara 0-2, J Kennedy 0-1.		A Qualter 1-2, E Morrissey 1-0, V Kelly 0-1, D O'Brien 0-1, M O'Brien 0-1, J O'Brien 0-1, J McCormack 0-1.

19 September 1999 Quarter-final	Mullinahone	2-20 - 2-08	Loughmore-Castleiney	Leahy Park
	E Kelly 1-8, P Kelly 1-4, B O'Meara 0-3, J Leahy 0-2, E Carey 0-2, K Vaughan 0-1.		S Bohan 1-4, M Gleeson 1-0, P Ormonde 0-3, P McGrath 0-1.

19 September 1999 Quarter-final replay	Holycross-Ballycahill	1-16 - 1-12	Carrick Swans	Leahy Park
	J Ferncombe 1-6, D Burke 0-4, T Lanigan 0-2, T Fogarty 0-2, B Ryan 0-1, J Butler 0-1.		R Dunne 0-5, M O'Halloran 0-4, W Loughman 1-0, J Grace 0-2, B Ryan 0-1.

=== Semi-finals ===
25 September 1999 Semi-final	Nenagh Éire Óg	4-18 - 1-10	Mullinahone	Semple Stadium
	K Tucker 2-6, M Hackett 2-3, M Cleary 0-3, D O'Meara 0-3, J Kennedy 0-1, J Slattery 0-1, R Tomlinson 0-1.		E Kelly 0-7, J Leahy 1-1, P Croke 0-1, P Kelly 0-1.

3 October 1999 Semi-final	Toomevara	2-17 - 4-09	Holycross-Ballycahill	Semple Stadium
	Tommy Dunne 0-9, P O'Brien 1-2, M Bevans 1-1, E Brislane 0-2, P Hackett 0-1, B Duff 0-1, Terry Dunne 0-1.		T Lanigan 3-3, J Ferncombe 1-3, W Ryan 0-1, D Duggan 0-1, D Quinlan 0-1.

=== Final ===
10 October 1999 Final	Toomevara	1-17 - 0-13	Nenagh Éire Óg	Semple Stadium
	T Dunne 1-7, P O'Brien 0-5, J O'Brien 0-2, M Bevans 0-1, B Duff 0-1, M O'Meara 0-1.		K Tucker 0-6, M Cleary 0-2, R Tomlinson 0-2, C Howard 0-1, M O'Meara 0-1, E Tucker 0-1.	Referee: J McDonnell (Roscrea)

== Championship statistics ==
=== Top scorers ===
Top scorers overall

Rank	Player	Club	Tally	Total	Matches	Average
1	Tommy Dunne	Toomevara	3-23	32	3	10.66
2	Kevin Tucker	Nenagh Éire Óg	2-17	23	3	7.66
3	John Ferncombe	Holycross-Ballycahill	2-16	22	3	7.33
4	Eoin Kelly	Mullinahone	1-15	18	2	9.00
5	Tony Lanigan	Holycross-Ballycahill	3-07	16	3	5.33
6	Michael O'Meara	Toomevara	2-04	10	3	3.33
6	Paddy O'Brien	Toomevara	1-07	10	3	3.33
8	Michael Hackett	Nenagh Éire Óg	2-03	9	3	3.00
8	Ray Dunne	Carrick Swans	0-09	9	2	4.50
10	Paul Kelly	Toomevara	1-05	8	3	2.6

Top scorers in a single game

Rank	Player	Club	Tally	Total	Opposition
1	Tommy Dunne	Toomevara	2-07	13	Éire Óg Annacarty
2	Tony Lanigan	Holycross-Ballycahill	3-03	12	Toomevara
2	Kevin Tucker	Nenagh Éire Óg	2-06	12	Mullinahone
4	Eoin Kelly	Mullinahone	2-05	11	Loughmore-Castleiney
5	Tommy Dunne	Toomevara	1-07	10	Nenagh Éire Óg
6	Michael O'Meara	Toomevara	2-03	9	Éire Óg Annacarty
6	Michael Hackett	Nenagh Éire Óg	2-03	9	Mullinahone
6	John Ferncombe	Holycross-Ballycahill	1-06	9	Carrick Swans
6	Tommy Dunne	Toomevara	0-09	9	Holycross-Ballycahill
10	Paul McGrath	Toomevara	1-04	7	Éire Óg Annacarty
10	Paul Kelly	Mullinahone	1-04	7	Loughmore-Castleiney
10	Séamus Bohan	Loughmore-Castleiney	1-04	7	Mullinahone
10	John Ferncombe	Holycross-Ballycahill	0-07	7	Carrick Swans
10	Eoin Kelly	Mullinahone	0-07	7	Nenagh Éire Óg
