= Thomas Wall =

Thomas Wall may refer to:

- Thomas Wall (theatre founder), founder of the first permanent theatrical company in Baltimore, Maryland
- Thomas Wall (cricketer) (1841–1875), English cricketer
- Thomas Wall (politician) (1840–?), American businessman and politician in Wisconsin

== See also ==
- Tom Wall (disambiguation)
