= John O'Brien (hurler) =

Irish hurler (born 1982)

Personal information
- Native name: Seán Ó Briain (Irish)
- Born: 3 January 1982 (age 44) Toomevara, County Tipperary, Ireland
- Occupation: Self-employed
- Height: 6 ft 2 in (188 cm)

Sport
- Sport: Hurling
- Position: Centre-forward
Club
- Years: Club
- 1999-present: Toomevara
Club titles
- Tipperary titles: 7
- Munster titles: 2
Inter-county*
Years	County	Apps (scores)
2001-2014	Tipperary	36 (3-45)
Inter-county titles
- Munster titles: 5
- All-Irelands: 2
- NHL: 1
- All Stars: 0
- *Inter County team apps and scores correct as of 18:57, 3 December 2014.

John O'Brien (born 3 January 1982) is an Irish hurler who played as a centre-forward for the Tipperary senior team.

Born in Toomevara, County Tipperary, O'Brien first arrived on the inter-county scene at the age of seventeen when he first linked up with the Tipperary minor team, before later joining the under-21 side. He made his senior debut during the 2001 league. O'Brien went on to enjoy a lengthy career, and won two All-Ireland medals, five Munster medals and one National Hurling League medals. He was an All-Ireland runner-up on three occasions.

At club level O'Brien is a two-time Munster medallist with Toomevara. In addition to this he has also won seven championship medals and three county final Man of the Match awards.

His brother, Paddy O'Brien, is also an All-Ireland medallist with Tipperary.

Throughout his career O'Brien made 36 championship appearances. He announced his retirement from inter-county hurling on 26 November 2014.

== Playing career ==
=== Club ===
O'Brien plays his club hurling with Toomevara and has enjoyed much success in a lengthy career.

After making his senior championship debut as a seventeen-year-old in 1999, Toomevara went on to qualify for a second successive county final. A 1–17 to 0–13 defeat of Nenagh Éire Óg gave O'Brien his first championship medal.

Toomevara's championship dominance continued for a third consecutive year in 2000. A 2–10 to 0–11 defeat of Thurles Sarsfield's gave O'Brien his second championship medal.

Both Toomevara and Thurles Sarsfield's met in the county final again in 2001. O'Brien's side were on the verge of history by becoming the third side in history to win four championships in-a-row. A 1–22 to 1-13 trouncing of the Thurles club gave O'Brien his third championship medal.

Five-in-a-row proved beyond Toomevara, however, the team reached the county final once again in 2003. A 3–16 to 3–13 defeat of Thurles Sarsfield's once again, gave O'Brien his fourth championship medal.

Toomevara retained their title in 2004 following a comfortable 4–12 to 2–12 win over Éire Óg/Golden. It was also a remarkable fifth championship medal in six seasons for O'Brien. After a number of early exits from the provincial championship in recent years, Toomevara subsequently defeated Mount Sion by just a single point to give O'Brien his first Munster medal.

After surrendering their county and provincial titles in 2005, Toomevara returned to the county championship decider once again the following year. A thrilling 1–21 to 2–14 defeat of Nenagh Éire Óg, in which O'Brien top scored with 1-4 from play, saw Toomevara take the title once again. O'Brien later won a second Munster medal following a controversial 2–9 to 2–8 defeat of Erin's Own of Cork.

In 2008 O'Brien won a seventh county championship medal following a 2–14 to 0–17 defeat of old rivals Thurles Sarsfield's.

=== Minor & under-21 ===
O'Brien was seventeen-years-old when he made his minor championship debut for Tipperary in 1999. He collected his first Munster medal that year following a 1–13 to 2–7 defeat of Clare. Tipp progressed to the All-Ireland final where Galway provided the opposition. A 0–13 to 0–10 score line resulted in defeat for O'Brien's side.

In 2003 O'Brien was in his last year as a member of the under-21 team. That year Tipperary broke through Limerick's stranglehold on the championship and O'Brien secured a Munster medal following a 2–14 to 0–17 defeat of Cork after extra-time.

=== Senior ===
==== Beginnings ====
O'Brien made his senior debut on 21 April 2001 in a 1–16 to 0-13 group stage defeat of Laois in the National League. Tipperary later claimed the league title, however, O'Brien remained as a substitute for that victory. Later that year he made his championship debut when he came on as substitute for Lar Corbett in the provincial decider against Limerick. Tipperary triumphed by 2–16 to 1–17, with O'Brien collecting his first Munster medal. He later collected an All-Ireland medal as a non-playing substitute as Tipperary defeated Galway by 2–18 to 2–15.

Over the next few years O'Brien remained on the periphery of the team as Tipperary went into decline.

==== Return to success ====
The appointment of Liam Sheedy as Tipperary's new manager saw O'Brien take to a more prominent role. Tipperary remained undefeated during their 2008 league campaign and qualified for the decider against Galway. A Lar Corbett goal proved decisive in the 3–18 to 3–16 victory. It was O'Brien's first National League medal on the field of play. He later collected a second Munster medal as Tipperary continued their winning streak with a 2–21 to 0–19 defeat of a resurgent Clare. After scoring 1–4 in that game he was named man of the match.

Tipperary retained their provincial crown in 2009, with O'Brien collecting a third Munster medal following a 4–14 to 2–16 defeat of Waterford. On 6 September 2009 Tipperary faced four-in-a-row hopefuls Kilkenny in the All-Ireland decider. For long periods Tipp looked the likely winners, however, late goals from Henry Shefflin and substitute Martin Comerford finally killed off their efforts to secure a 2–22 to 0–23 victory.

Three successive Munster titles proved beyond Tipperary, however, in spite of a shock defeat by Cork in the provincial quarter-final, Tipperary used the qualifiers to good effect and qualified for the All-Ireland decider on 5 September 2010. Kilkenny were the opponents once again as they sought a fifth successive All-Ireland crown title. "The Cats" lost talisman Henry Shefflin early in the game due to injury, while Tipp's Lar Corbett ran riot and scored a hat-trick of goals before Noel McGrath added a fourth. The 4–17 to 1–18 victory gave O'Brien his first All-Ireland medal on the field of play.

Tipperary reclaimed the provincial crown in 2011 following a huge 7–19 to 0-19 drubbing of Waterford in the decider. It was O'Brien's fourth Munster medal. Tipperary subsequently faced Kilkenny in a third successive All-Ireland decider on 4 September 2011. Goals by Michael Fennelly and Richie Hogan in either half gave Kilkenny, who many viewed as the underdogs going into the game, a 2–17 to 1–16 victory.

==== Final years ====
Tipperary won their fourth Munster crown in five years in 2012 as they easily retained the title. The 2–17 to 0–16 defeat of Waterford gave O'Brien a fifth provincial winners' medal.

After a poor start to their 2014 championship campaign, Tipperary reached the All-Ireland final on 7 September 2014. O'Brien started the game on the bench but was introduced as a substitute in what some consider to be the greatest game of all time. John O'Dwyer had the chance to win the game, however, his late free drifted wide resulting in a draw. O'Brien was also sprung from the bench in the replay which Kilkenny won by 2–17 to 2–14.

O'Brien announced his retirement from inter-county hurling on 26 November 2014. In a released statement he said "I wish to announce my retirement from the Tipperary Hurling team. It has been an honour to have represented my county at senior level since my debut in 2001. I would like to thank everyone who has supported me and made it possible for me to play, most importantly my family and friends, my club Toomevara, the management and backroom teams throughout those years which are too many to mention and also the Tipperary public. I have made many great friends over those years and I would like to wish the current panel and management team the very best of luck."

== Honours ==
=== Team ===
Toomevara

- Munster Senior Club Hurling Championship (2): 2004, 2006
- Tipperary Senior Club Hurling Championship (7): 1999, 2000, 2001, 2003, 2004, 2006, 2008

Tipperary

- All-Ireland Senior Hurling Championship (2): 2001, 2010
- Munster Senior Hurling Championship (5): 2001, 2008, 2009, 2011, 2012
- National Hurling League (1): 2008
- Munster Under-21 Hurling Championship (1): 2003
- Munster Minor Hurling Championship (1): 1999

Preceded by Lar Corbett	Tipperary Senior Hurling Captain; 2007	Succeeded by Paul Ormonde
