= Willie Wall (hurler) =

Irish hurler

William Wall
Personal information
- Born: 5 September 1912
- Died: 17 April 2004 (aged 91)

Sport
- Sport: Hurling
- Club: Carrick Swans

William Wall (5 September 1912 – 17 April 2004) was an Irish sportsperson. He played hurling with his local club Carrick Swans and was a member of the Tipperary senior inter-county team in the late 1930s. Wall won a set of All-Ireland and Munster winners' medals with Tipperary in 1937.
