= Ger O'Grady =

Irish hurler

Ger 'Redser' O'Grady
Personal information
- Native name: Gearóid Ó Gráda (Irish)
- Nickname: Redser
- Born: Thurles, County Tipperary

Sport
- Sport: Hurling
- Position: Forward
Club
- Years: Club
- Thurles Sarsfields
Club titles
- Tipperary titles: 3
Inter-county
Years	County	Apps (scores)
2003-2006	Tipperary	10 (2-6)
Inter-county titles
- Munster titles: 0
- All-Irelands: 0
- NHL: 0

Ger "Redser" O'Grady (born 1979 in Thurles, County Tipperary) is an Irish sportsperson. He plays hurling with his local club Thurles Sarsfields and is a former member of the Tipperary senior inter-county team.

Ger O'Grady was born in Thurles, County Tipperary in 1979. He was educated locally and plays his club hurling with Thurles Sarsfields. He was captain of the team in 2005 when they won their first County Senior Hurling title in thirty-one years. O'Grady has played for Tipperary at minor, Under-21 & Intermediate level, winning a Munster Under-21 medal as a substitute in 1999. O'Grady made his competitive debut for the Tipperary senior hurlers in the 2003 National League against Offaly. Later that year he made his Championship debut against Laois in the All-Ireland Qualifiers.

== See also ==
- Tipperary Player Profiles

Preceded by Benny Dunne	Tipperary Senior Hurling Captain; 2006	Succeeded by Lar Corbett
