= Noel Morris =

Irish hurler

Personal information
- Native name: Nollaig Ó Muiris (Irish)
- Born: 1975 (age 50–51) Loughmore, County Tipperary, Ireland

Sport
- Sport: Hurling
- Position: Midfielder
Club
Years	Club	Apps (scores)
1993-2005	Loughmore–Castleiney	68, 5-93
Inter-county
Years	County	Apps (scores)
2000-2004	Tipperary	10 (0-4)
Inter-county titles
- Munster titles: 1
- All-Irelands: 1
- NHL: 1
- All Stars: 0

Noel Morris (born 1975) is an Irish hurler who played as a midfielder for the Tipperary senior team.

Morris joined the team during the 2000 championship and was a member of the team until he left the panel after the 2004 championship. He won National League, Munster and all-Ireland medals in 2001. Noel also won a minor Munster medal in 93 and Munster and all-Ireland u21 medals in 1995.

At club level Morris plays with the Loughmore–Castleiney club.
