= Eugene O'Neill (hurler) =

Irish hurler

Personal information
- Native name: Eoghan Ó Néill (Irish)
- Born: 15 April 1978 (age 48) Cappawhite, County Tipperary, Ireland
- Height: 5 ft 10 in (178 cm)

Sport
- Sport: Hurling
- Position: Right corner-forward
Club
- Years: Club
- Cappawhite
Club titles
- Tipperary titles: 0
College
- Years: College
- Cork Institute of Technology
College titles
- Fitzgibbon titles: 0
Inter-county
- Years: County
- 1997-2003: Tipperary
Inter-county titles
- Munster titles: 1
- All-Irelands: 1
- NHL: 2

Eugene O'Neill (born 15 February 1978) is an Irish former hurler. At club level, he played with Cappawhite and at inter-county level with the Tipperary senior hurling team.

== Career ==
O'Neill first played hurling to a high standard as a secondary school student at Doon CBS. He won a Munster Colleges SBHC medal in 1995, before later scoring four points in Doon's 5-11 to 0-04 defeat of St Patrick's College, Maghera in the All-Ireland final. O'Neill later played with Cork Institute of Technology in the Fitzgibbon Cup.

At club level, O'Neill first played with Cappawhite at juvenile and underage levels. He won several divisional underage titles as a dual player, as well as the Tipperary U21HC title in 1999. By that stage, O'Neill had progressed to adult level with Cappawhite and won three West Tipperary SHC titles between 2000 and 2005.

O'Neill first appeared on the inter-county scene with Tipperary at minor level. He won a Munster MHC medal, as well as being full-forward on the team that won the All-Ireland MHC title in 1996. His subsequent three seasons with the under-21 team ended with a Munster U21HC medal in 1999.

Progression to the senior team was immediate for O'Brien. He was at full-forward when Tipperary were beaten by Clare in the 1997 All-Ireland final, however, he ended his debut season by being named Young Hurler of the Year.

O'Brien claimed a his first senior silverware in 1999 when Tipperary won the National Hurling League title, before adding a second league medal to his collection in 2001. Tipperary made a clean sweep of all the major hurling competitions that season, with O'Brien later winning a Munster SHC before Tipperary beat Galway in the 2001 All-Ireland final.

== Honours ==
Doon CBS

- All-Ireland Colleges Senior B Hurling Championship: 1995
- Munster Colleges Senior B Hurling Championship: 1995

Cappawhite

- West Tipperary Senior Hurling Championship (3): 2000, 2001, 2005
- Tipperary Under-21 Hurling Championship (1): 1999

Tipperary

- All-Ireland Senior Hurling Championship (1): 2001
- Munster Senior Hurling Championship (1): 2001
- National Hurling League (2): 1999, 2001
- Munster Under-21 Hurling Championship (1): 1999
- All-Ireland Minor Hurling Championship (1): 1996
- Munster Minor Hurling Championship (1): 1996

Awards
Preceded by Newly created award	All-Star Young Hurler of the Year; 1997	Succeeded by Stephen Byrne Offaly
