= Moneygall GAA =

Gaelic Athletic Association club in County Tipperary, Ireland

Moneygall
- Muine Gall
- Founded: 1885
- County: Tipperary
- Colours: Black and Red
- Grounds: St. Flannan's Park
- Coordinates: 52°52′58.97″N 7°56′48.68″W

Playing kits
Standard colours

Senior Club Championships
	All Ireland	Munster champions	Tipperary champions
Hurling:	-	-	2

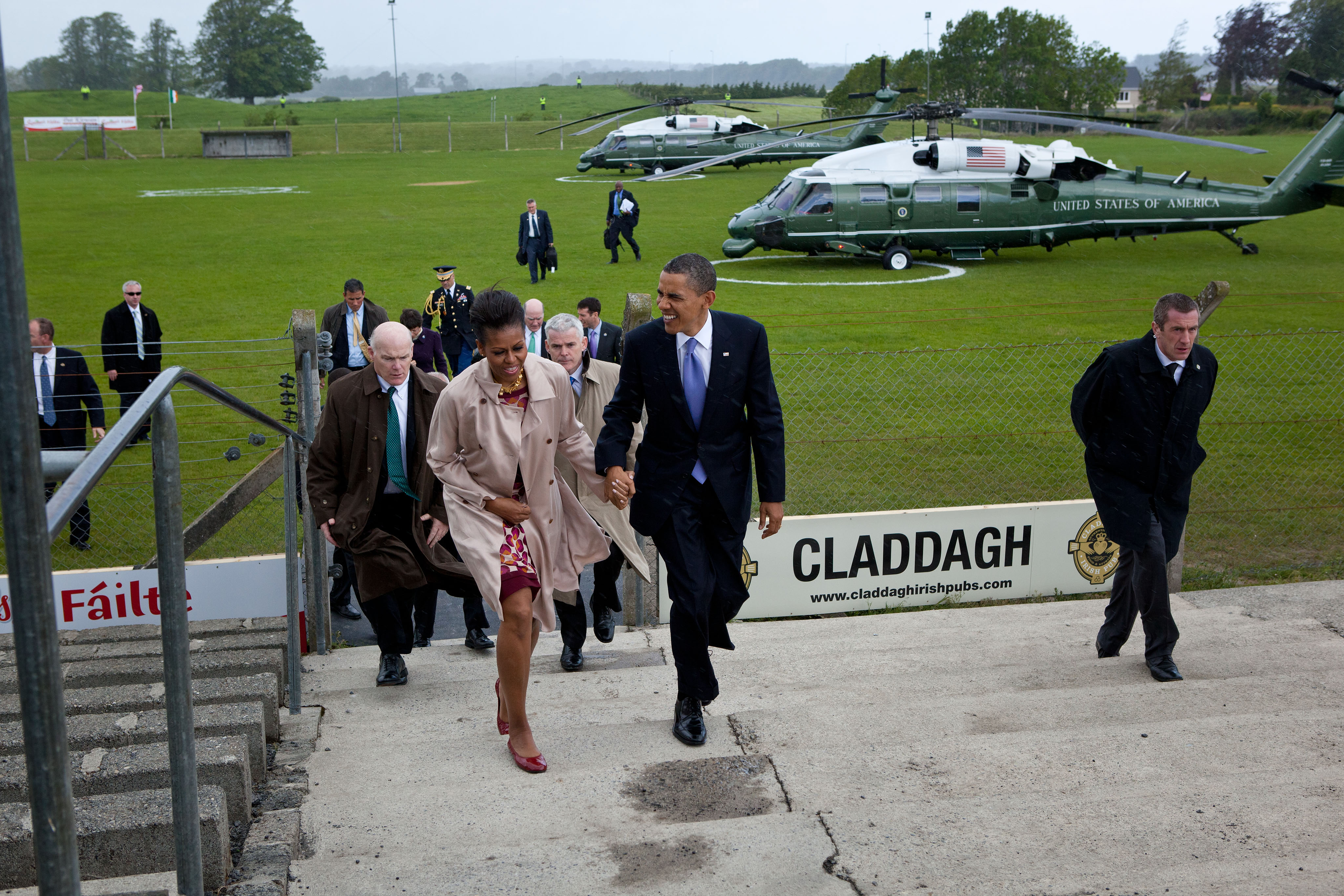
President Barack Obama and Michelle Obama at Saint Flannan's Park

Moneygall GAA is a Gaelic Athletic Association club located in County Tipperary in Ireland. Both hurling and Gaelic football are played in the North Tipperary divisional championships, although the club is mainly known for hurling. The club represents the parish of Dunkerrin, which includes the villages of Moneygall, Dunkerrin and Barna. The Tipperary-Offaly county boundary runs through the parish.

== History ==
In 1885, a local team called The Honeymounts was formed, named after the townland of Honeymount within the parish. This club's colours were black and amber. In 1889, they were challenged to a match by a nearby team from Ballingarry and Shinrone.

In the early 1900s, the club became known as Moneygall. They were affiliated to Offaly in the early days and contested an Offaly Senior hurling final in 1906, when they were beaten by Coolderry. A dispute arose following the 1910 Offaly Junior final when Dunkerrin beat Killoughey. Killoughey objected, the Offaly Board upheld the objection. Uphappy at the Board's treatment, Moneygall/Dunkerrin moved to Tipperary and have remained there ever since.

The club was combined with Toomevara for a decade or so from 1910 onwards. Several Tipperary Senior Hurling Championships were won at this time, but since the team's name was Toomevara, the "Greyhounds" received the laurels and entered the roll of honour under the Toomevara club name. In January 1917, Moneygall's Jer Collison became the first man from the North Tipperary division to win an All Ireland senior hurling medal with Tipperary, playing on the Tipperary team that beat Kilkenny in the delayed 1916 All-Ireland Senior Hurling Championship Final.

In 1935 a hurling pitch, St. Flannan's Park, was developed adjacent to the village. A perimeter wall was built in 1959 enclosing the playing pitch. In 1977 a stand and clubhouse with dressing rooms, hall, office, shop and handball alley were built in the grounds. This building was extended in 2009 to include an extra dressing room and a meeting room. In 2013 a patch of land was purchased adjacent to the existing grounds, and following seven years of fundraising and development a second playing field and community walkway opened for use in 2020.

From 1967 to 1970, Moneygall's Séamus Ó Riain was President of the Gaelic Athletic Association. During his tenure he helped establish Féile na nGael, the annual national Under 14 hurling festival which was first held in 1971, and is hosted by different counties every year.

U.S. President Barack Obama and his wife Michelle visited Moneygall on 23 May 2011. The President's entourage faced gale-force winds to fly from the Phoenix Park in Dublin in two Chinook and two Black Hawk helicopters. The violent winds exceeded normal conditions for helicopter flying, and some passengers became sick during the 40 minute trip. The party landed in St. Flannan's Park in wet and blustery conditions. One of the President's advisers was felled by a blast of wind and papers she was carrying were scattered across the hurling pitch, pursued by Gardaí.

== Honours ==
The club's most successful period in the club's history was in the 1970s when it won the Tipperary Senior Hurling Championship in 1975 and 1976 under the captaincy of Pat Sheedy and Michael Doherty respectively. In the former year, they also captured their only North Tipperary senior hurling title. North Championships were won at Intermediate level in 1943, 1949, 1962, 1991 and 2019 with the county championship being added in 1991, while the County Junior hurling championship was won in both 1949 and 2008. The club won the North Tipperary senior football championship in 1965 and 1966, also reaching the Tipperary Senior Football Championship final in 1965, losing to Clonmel Commercials. The club has also combined with other neighbouring clubs to compete in the various football championships at divisional and county level from time to time.

- Tipperary Senior Hurling Championship (2) 1975, 1976
- North Tipperary Senior Hurling Championship (1) 1975
- North Tipperary Senior Football Championship (1) 1965
- Tipperary Intermediate Hurling Championship (2) 1991, 2024
- North Tipperary Intermediate Hurling Championship (5) 1943, 1949, 1962, 1991, 2019
- North Tipperary Intermediate Football Championship (1) 1980
- Tipperary Junior A Hurling Championship (2) 1949, 2008
- North Tipperary Junior A Hurling Championship (4) 1919, 1929, 2008, 2011
- Tipperary Junior A Football Championship (1) 1964
- North Tipperary Junior A Football Championship (10) 1927, 1942, 1949, 1950, 1951, 1963, 1964, 1965, 1983, 1984
- Tipperary Junior B Football Championship (1) 2006
- North Tipperary Junior B Football Championship (1) 2006
- Tipperary Under-21 A Hurling Championship (1) 1992
- North Tipperary Under-21 A Hurling Championship (1) 1992
- Tipperary Under-21 B Hurling Championship (2) 1987, 1991
- North Tipperary Under-21 B Hurling Championship (3) 1985, 1987, 1991
- Tipperary Under-21 C Hurling Championship (1) 2010
- North Tipperary Under-21 C Hurling Championship (1) 2010
- Tipperary Under-21 A Football Championship (1) 1965
- North Tipperary Under-21 A Football Championship (3) 1965, 1966, 1967, 2017 (with Clonakenny)
- North Tipperary Under-21 B Football Championship (2) 2002, 2003
- Mid Tipperary Under-21 B Football Championship (1) 2012 (with Clonakenny)
- North Tipperary Minor A Hurling Championship (1) 2016 (with Clonakenny)
- Tipperary Minor B Hurling Championship (4) 1989, 1997, 2002, 2015 (with Clonakenny)
- North Tipperary Minor B Hurling Championship (4) 1989, 1997, 2002, 2015 (with Clonakenny)
- North Tipperary Minor A Football Championship (1) 2016 (with Clonakenny)
- North Tipperary Minor B Football Championship (1) 1986
