= Paddy O'Brien (Tipperary hurler) =

Irish hurler

Personal information
- Native name: Pádraig Ó Briain (Irish)
- Born: 1979 (age 46–47) Toomevara, County Tipperary, Ireland

Sport
- Sport: Hurling
- Position: Left corner-forward
Club
- Years: Club
- Toomevara
Club titles
- Tipperary titles: 8
- Munster titles: 2
Inter-county
Years	County	Apps (scores)
2000-2006	Tipperary	8 (0-2)
Inter-county titles
- Munster titles: 0
- All-Irelands: 1
- NHL: 0
- All Stars: 0

Paddy O'Brien (born 1979) is an Irish hurler who played as a left corner-forward for the Tipperary senior team.

O'Brien joined the team during the 2000 championship and was a member of the team until he left the panel after the 2006 championship. An All-Ireland medalist in the minor grade, he later won a senior All-Ireland winners' medal on the field of play.

At club level O'Brien is a two-time Munster medalist with Toomevara. In addition to this he has also won eight county club championship medals.
