= Johnny Enright =

Irish hurler

Personal information
- Native name: Seánie Mac Ionnrachtaigh (Irish)
- Born: 1977 (age 48–49) Thurles, County Tipperary, Ireland
- Occupation: Management consultant
- Height: 5 ft 8 in (173 cm)

Sport
- Sport: Hurling
- Position: Right corner-forward
Clubs
- Years: Club
- Thurles Sarsfields; University College Cork; Éire Óg-Corrachoill
Club titles
- Tipperary titles: 4
- Munster titles: 1
- All-Ireland Titles: 0
College
- Years: College
- 1995–2000: University College Cork
College titles
- Fitzgibbon titles: 3
Inter-county*
Years	County	Apps (scores)
1996–2002 2012	Tipperary; Kildare	0 (0-00); 3 (0-07)
Inter-county titles
- Munster titles: 0
- All-Irelands: 0
- NHL: 0
- All Stars: 0
- *Inter County team apps and scores correct as of 12:50, 16 April 2019.

John Enright (born 1977) is an Irish hurling selector and former hurler who predominantly played for Tipperary Senior Championship club Thurles Sarsfields. He played for the Tipperary senior hurling team at various times over a six-year period, during which time he usually lined out as a right corner-forward.

Enright began his hurling career at club level with Thurles Sarsfields. He joined his older brother Eddie on the club's senior team as a 16-year-old in 1993 and, towards the end of his career in 2012, he won a Munster Club Championship medal. Enright was also part of four Tipperary Club Championship-winning teams, including as captain in 2009. He also lined out with the Éire Óg-Corrachoill club in the Kildare Club Championship, and was also selected for University College Cork, with whom he won three successive Fitzgibbon Cup titles.

At inter-county level, Enright was part of the Tipperary minor team that won the Munster Championship in 1993 before later lining out for three seasons with the Tipperary under-21 team. He joined the Tipperary senior team in 1996. Enright lined out with the senior team at various times over the following six years, however, he failed to secure a permanent place on the starting fifteen. He left the panel for the final time in 2002. Enright returned to inter-county hurling a decade later and won a National Hurling League medal in Division 2B with the Kildare senior hurling team.

He joined the Meath backroom team ahead of the 2021 season.

== Honours ==
University College Cork

- Fitzgibbon Cup (3): 1996, 1997, 1998

Thurles Sarsfields

- Munster Senior Club Hurling Championship (1): 2012
- Tipperary Senior Hurling Championship (4): 2005, 2009 (c), 2010, 2012

Tipperary

- Munster Minor Hurling Championship (1): 1993

Kildare

- National Hurling League Division 2B (1): 2012
