= Killenaule GAA =

Gaelic games club in County Tipperary, Ireland

Killenaule
- Cill Náile
- Founded: 1885
- County: Tipperary
- Nickname: The Robins
- Colours: Red and Yellow
- Grounds: The Robins Nest, Killenaule
- Coordinates: 52°33′53.10″N 7°40′06.93″W

Playing kits
Standard colours

Killenaule GAA is a Gaelic Athletic Association club is located in south County Tipperary, Ireland. The club participates in hurling and Gaelic football competitions organized by Tipperary GAA. The club is a member of the South Tipperary divisional board.

== Honours ==
- All Ireland Junior B Hurling Championship Runners up (1): 2015
- Munster Junior B Hurling Championship Winners (1) : 2015
- Tipperary Senior Hurling Championship Runners-Up 1932, 1942
- Tipperary Intermediate Football Championship Winners (2): 2004 , 2026
- South Tipperary Senior Hurling Championship Winners: 1916, 1918, 1931, 1932, 1940 (Killenaule CYMS), 1941, 1942, 1943, 1953, 1954, 1955, 1961, 1963, 1988, 1989, 1991, 2005, 2007, 2008, 2013, 2015
- South Tipperary Senior Football Championship Winners (2): 2012, 2014
- South Tipperary Intermediate Football Championship Winner (1): 2004
- South Tipperary Intermediate Hurling Championship Winners (6): 1968, 1974, 1978, 1983, 1985, 1986
- Tipperary Junior A Football Championship Winners (1): 1994
- South Tipperary Junior A Football Championship Winners (2): 1982, 1994
- South Tipperary Junior B Football Championship Winners (1): 1997
- Tipperary Junior A Hurling Championship Winners (2): 1927, 1951
- South Tipperary Junior A Hurling Championship Winners (7): 1915, 1927, 1931, 1937, 1938, 1951, 1973
- Tipperary Junior B Hurling Championship Winners (1): 2014
- South Tipperary Junior B Hurling Championship Winners (3): 1997, 2013, 2014
- South Tipperary Under-21 A Football Championship Winners (2): 1978 (with Mullinahone as Young Irelands), 2003
- South Tipperary Minor Football Championship Winners (2): 1977 (with Mullinahone as Young Irelands), 2006
- Tipperary Minor B Football Championship Winners: (1) 2009
- South Tipperary Minor B Football Championship Winners (2): 1995, 2009
- South Tipperary Minor Hurling Championship Winners (10): 1955, 1958, 1965, 1989, 1990, 1993, 1999, 2001, 2001, 2002
- Tipperary Under-21 A Hurling Championship Winners: 2003, 2004

== Notable players ==
- Kieran Bergin
- Gerry Kennedy
- Pat Kerwick
- Donie O'Connell
- Joe O'Dwyer
- John O'Dwyer
- Paul Shelly
- Declan Fanning
