= Carrick Swans GAA =

Irish Gaelic Athletic Association club

Carrick Swans
- Ealaí na Carraige
- County: Tipperary
- Nickname: The Swans
- Colours: Black and White
- Grounds: Carrick-on-Suir
- Coordinates: 52°20′55.11″N 7°25′09.72″W

Playing kits
Standard colours

Senior Club Championships
	All Ireland	Munster champions	Tipperary champions
Hurling:	-	-	1

Carrick Swan GAA is a Gaelic Athletic Association club, located in the town of Carrick-on-Suir in south County Tipperary in Ireland.

The Swan are predominantly a hurling club and lead the roll of honour for the number of South Tipperary senior hurling championships won. The club enjoys a keen rivalry with the longer established Carrick Davins, named in honour of Maurice Davin, first President of the GAA who lived at Deerpark near the town. They have one of the best setups for underage youngsters in the county with numerous county titles been won underage. The Swans' most famous players were the Wall brothers, Willie and Tom who played with distinction for Tipperary in the 1940s.

== Honours ==
- Tipperary Senior Hurling Championship: (1) 1947
- South Tipperary Senior Hurling Championship: (26) 1933, 1935, 1936, 1939, 1944, 1945, 1946, 1947, 1948, 1950, 1952, 1958, 1959, 1974, 1978, 1983, 1984, 1985, 1986, 1990, 2000, 2010, 2017, 2022, 2024, 2025
- Tipperary Intermediate Football Championship: (2) 1999, 2009
- Tipperary Junior A Football Championship (1) 2025
- Tipperary Junior B Football Championship: (1) 2008
- South Tipperary Intermediate Football Championship: (6) 1975, 1982, 1985, 1997, 1999, 2009
- South Tipperary Junior A Football Championship: (3) 1974, 2009, 2025
- South Tipperary Junior B Football Championship: (2) 1999, 2008
- South Tipperary Junior Hurling Championship: (6) 1928, 1932, 1943, 1955, 1965, 1984
- Tipperary Junior B Hurling Championship: (1) 1994
- South Tipperary Junior B Hurling Championship: (3) 1994, 2003, 2016
- South Tipperary Under-21 A Football Championship: (1) 2005
- South Tipperary Under-21 B Football Championship: (3) 1991, 1999, 2013
- Tipperary Under-21 A Hurling Championship: (1) 1972
- South Tipperary Under-21 A Hurling Championship: (12) 1962, 1971, 1972, 1973, 1974, 1982, 1983, 2006, 2007, 2008, 2013, 2015
- South Tipperary Under-21 B Hurling Championship: (2) 2003, 2011
- Tipperary Minor B Football Championship: (3) 1987, 1997, 2003
- South Tipperary Minor B Football Championship: (3) 1987, 1997, 2003
- Tipperary Minor A Hurling Championship: (1) 2004
- South Tipperary Minor Hurling Championship: (16) 1940, 1942, 1948, 1956, 1969, 1970, 1971, 1973, 1976, 1981, 1982, 1983, 2003, 2004, 2005, 2013
- South Tipperary Minor B Hurling Championship: (2) 1988, 2010

== Notable players ==
- Jimmy Cooney
- Séamus Mackey
- Willie Wall
- Tommy Wall
