= Toomevara =

Village in County Tipperary, Ireland

Toomevara Tuaim Uí Mheára (Irish)
- Village
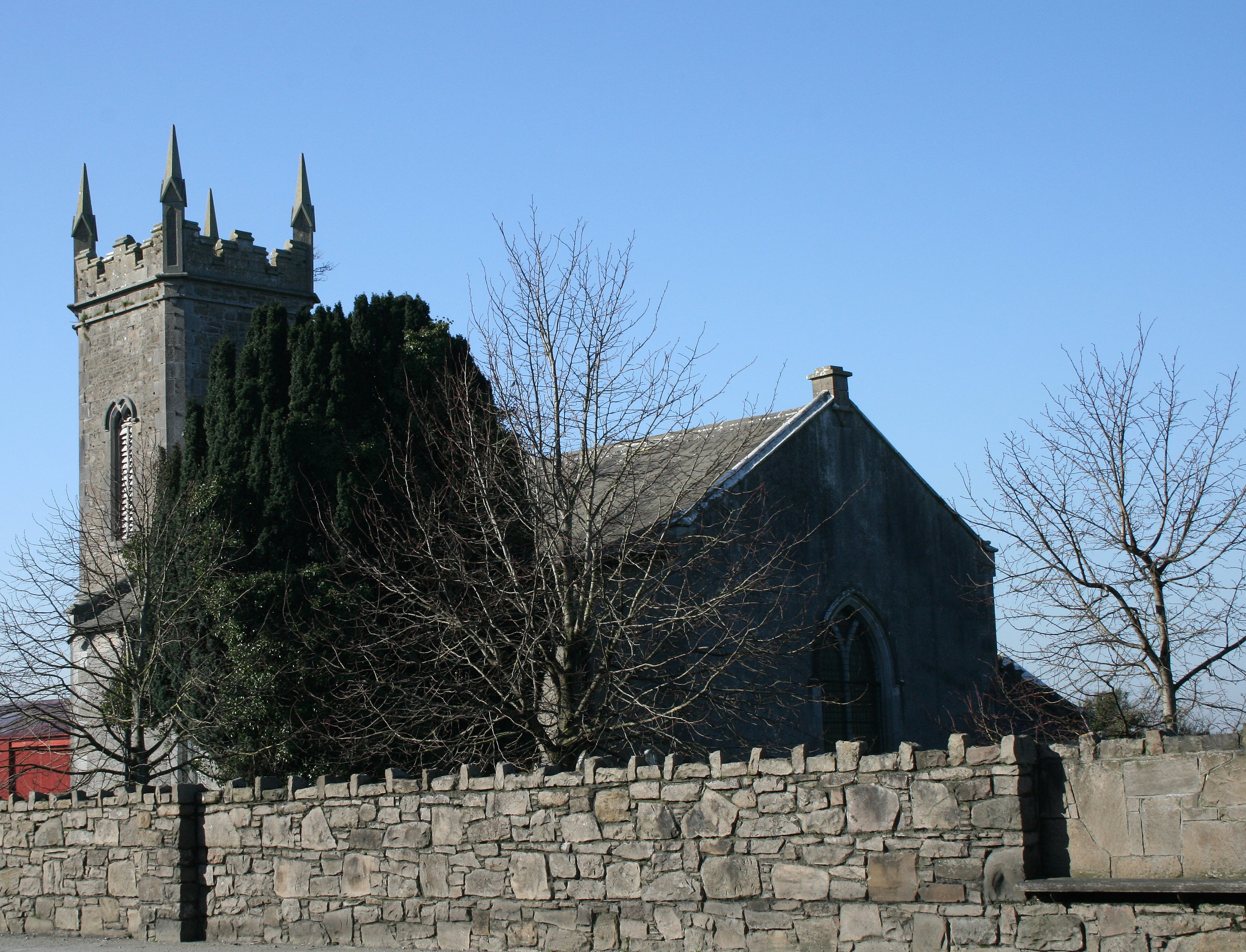
- Former Church of Ireland church on Toomevara Main St

- Location in Ireland
- Coordinates: 52°51′00″N 8°02′10″W
- Country: Ireland
- Province: Munster
- County: County Tipperary

Population (2016)
  - Total: 280
- Time zone: UTC+0 (WET)
  - Summer (DST): UTC-1 (IST (WEST))

Toomevara, officially Toomyvara (Irish: Tuaim Uí Mheára, meaning 'tumulus of the Ó Meadhra's'), is a village in County Tipperary, Ireland, 11 km east of Nenagh. It is a parish in the Roman Catholic Diocese of Killaloe, and is in the historical barony of Ormond Upper.

== Transport ==
Local Link Tipperary operates bus service No. 854 between Roscrea and Nenagh which stops at Main Street. The service operates seven days a week with three services in each direction.

The village is at the junction of the R445 road and the R499 road. The village was bypassed in December 2010 by the M7 Dublin – Limerick motorway.

== Sport and recreation ==
Toomevara GAA club and Toomevara Camogie Club are based in the area.

Toomevara is on the route of the Beara-Breifne Way, a long-distance walking and cycling trail between the Beara Peninsula in County Cork and Blacklion in County Cavan.

== Medieval Toomevara ==
In the Civil Survey (1654-6) Toomevara is described as 'the sd manor of Tome ye privilege of a Court Leete & a Court Barron, a Fayre twice a yeare, & a markett every Tuesday'. In the centre of the village are the ruins of a possible rectangular church building composed of roughly coursed limestone rubble with a possible priest's chamber at the West end. The wall construction different from that of the nearby priory suggesting a different date for the construction of this building. It may have been a late medieval parish church associated with the village of Toomevara. It is listed in the ecclesiastical taxation of the Diocese of Killaloe in 1302.

== Augustinian Priory ==
Next to St Joseph's Church are the remains of an Augustinian priory dedicated to St Mary which was founded some time after 1140. The site was possibly an earlier monastic centre dedicated to St Donain. The priory was a daughterhouse of Monaincha and appears to have been strongly associated with the ruling O'Meara dynasty. In 1450 the warden pleaded that, on account of poverty, the value being under 16 marks he and his convent could not be decently maintained, nor repair the cloister and other buildings, most of which had been burnt down during wars. Donogh O'Meara was building a castle here in 1541. In 1597 Miler mac Grath was granted the 'site, circuit and precint of the late priory of Thome' with a 'butt of a ruined castle with certain ruined chambers thatched'. At the dissolution the property of the priory of Toomevara is listed as 'one castle, wall and other buildings on the site'.

== Gallery ==
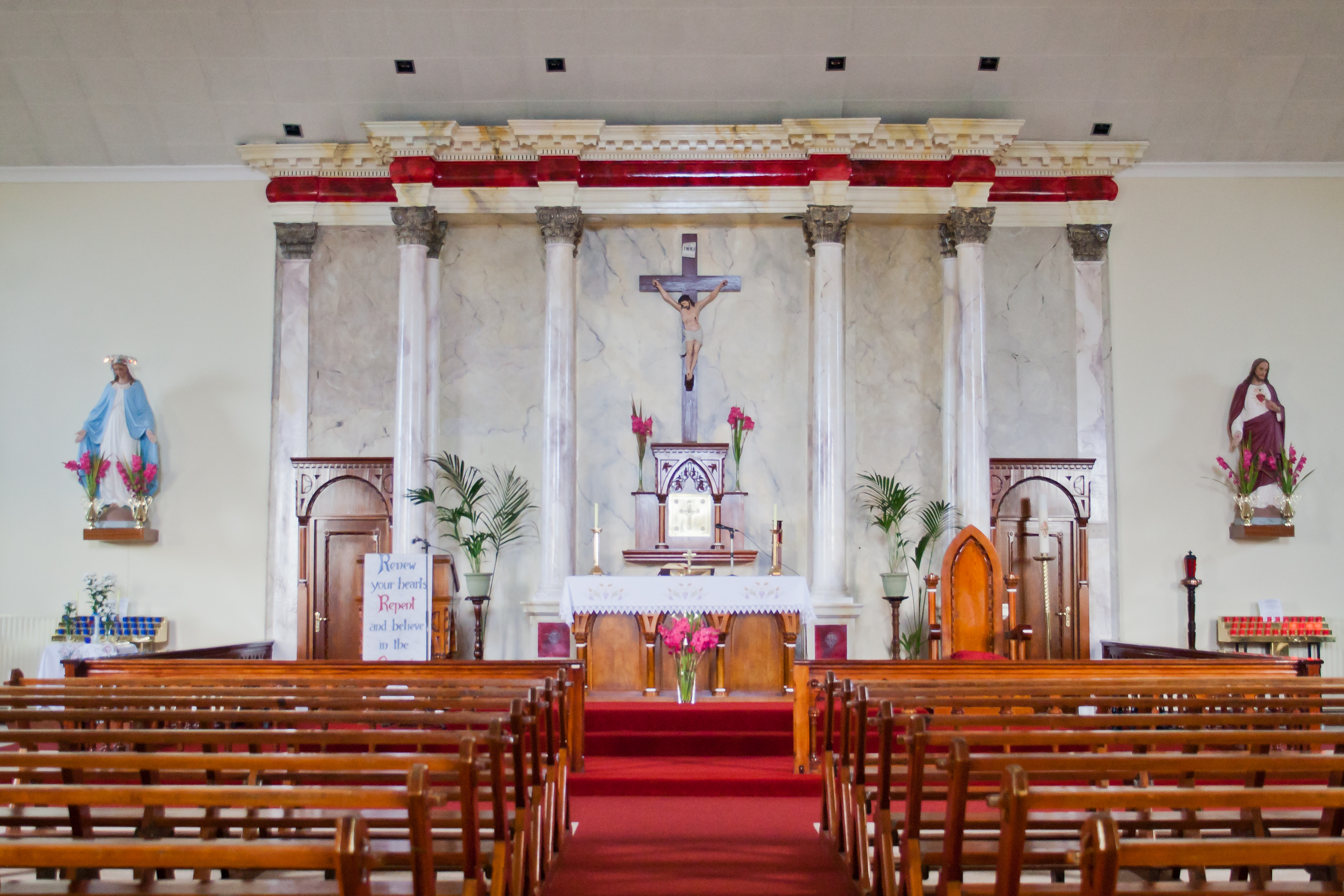
Nave and Altar of St Joseph's

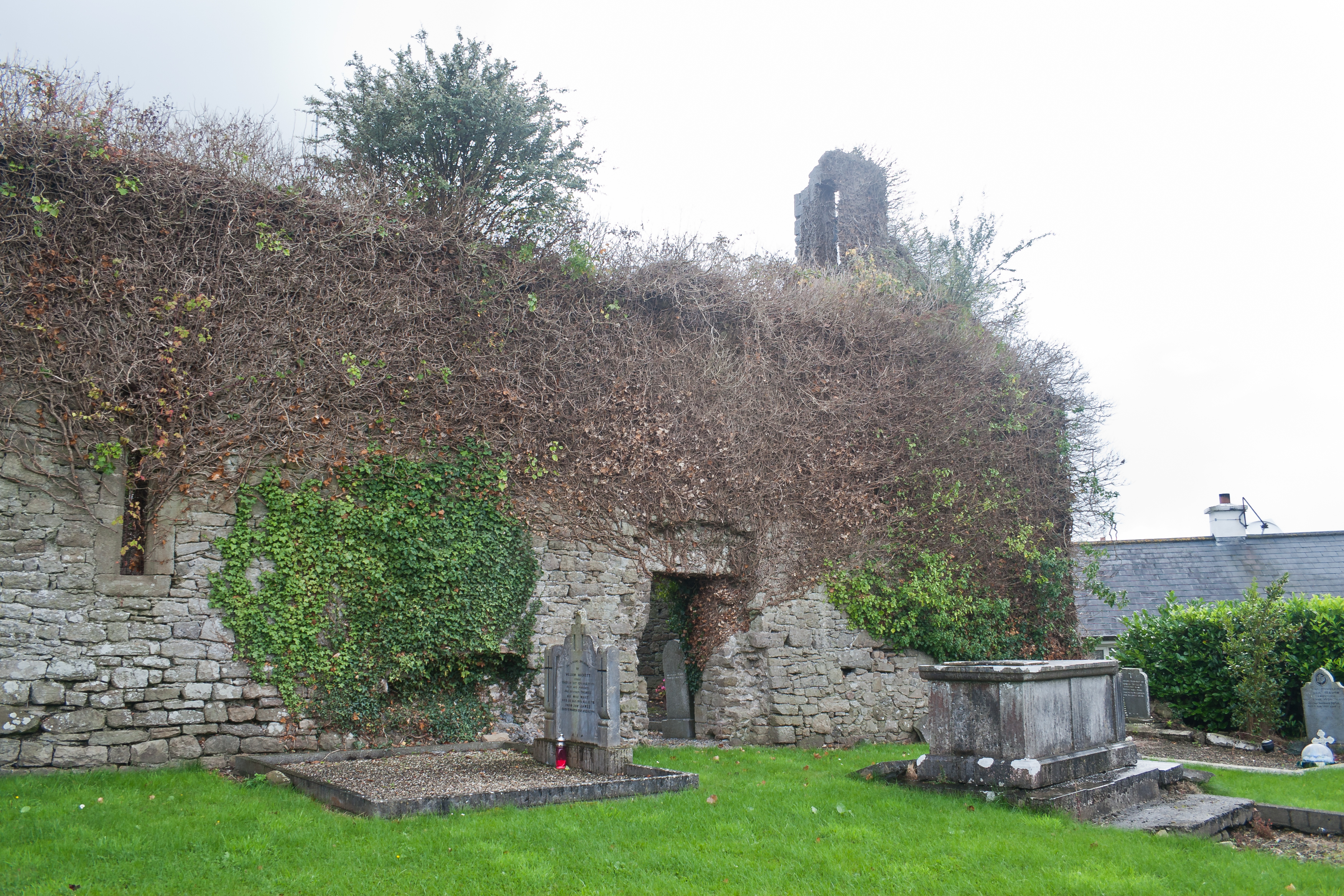
North Wall of Toomyvara Priory

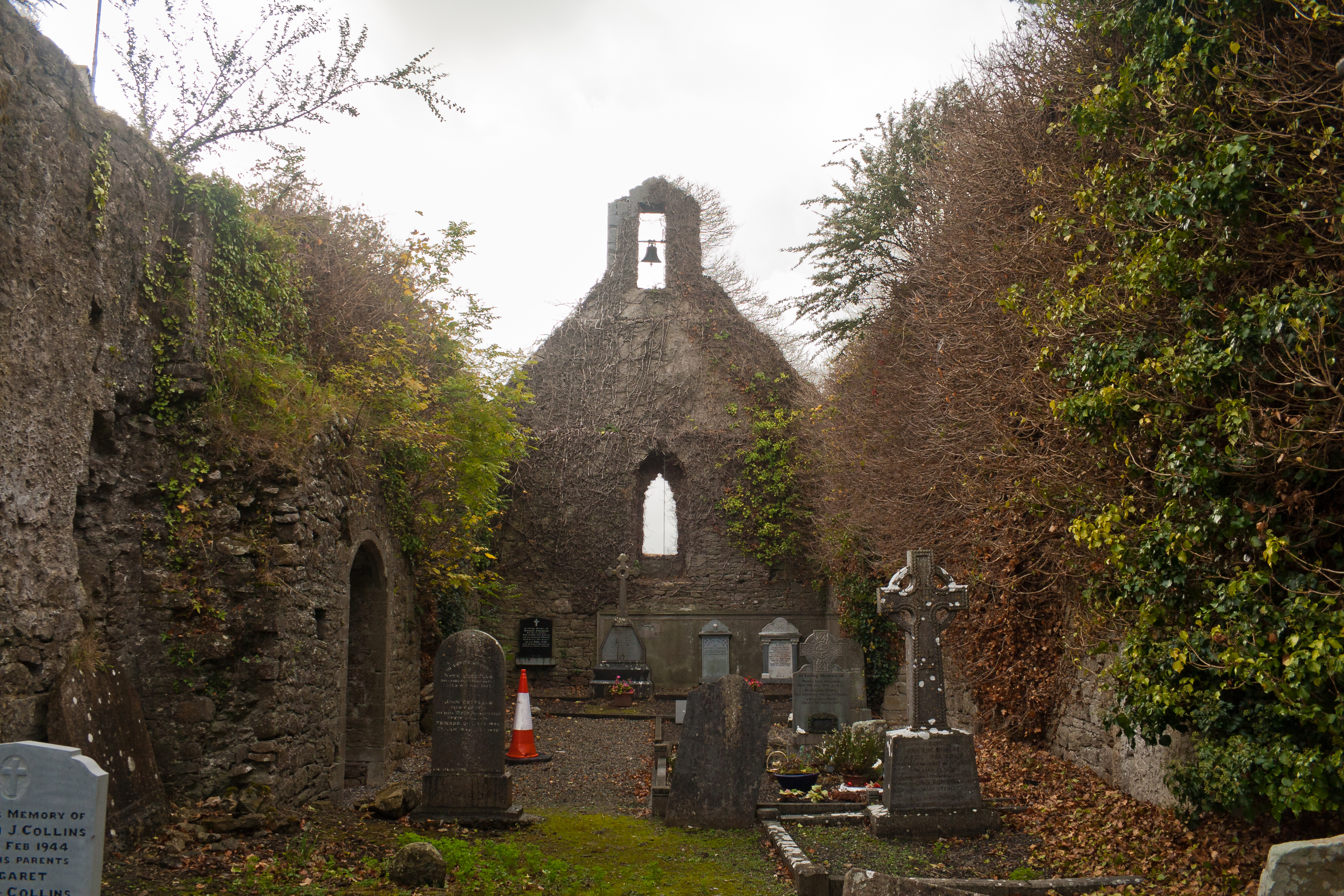
Nave of Toomyvara Priory

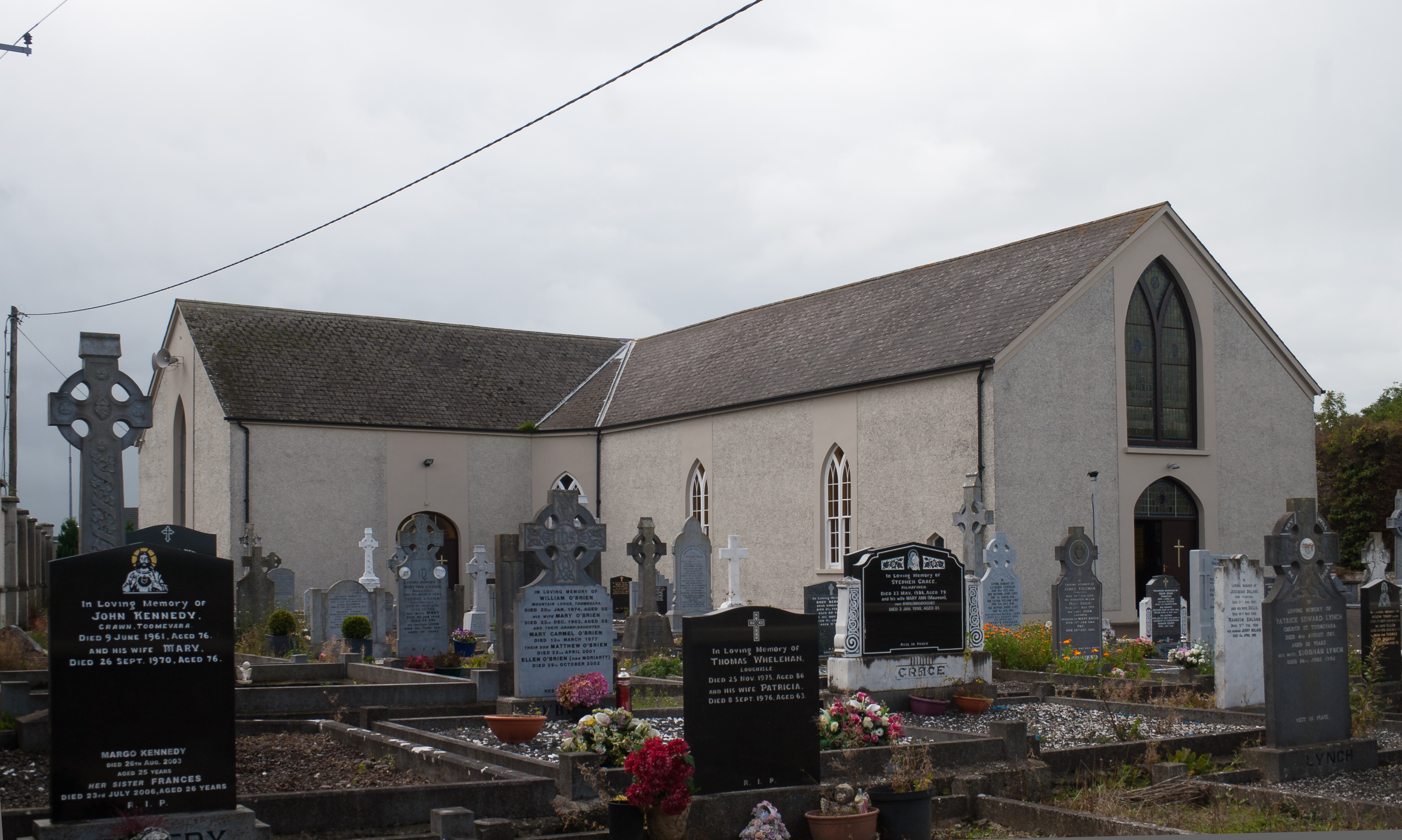
St Joseph's Church
