= Mullinahone GAA =

Gaelic games club in County Tipperary, Ireland

Mullinahone-CJ Kickhams
- Muileann na hUamhan
- Founded: 1885
- County: Tipperary
- Colours: Green and Red
- Grounds: Mullinahone
- Coordinates: 52°30′55.21″N 7°30′04.47″W

Playing kits
Standard colours

Senior Club Championships
	All Ireland	Munster champions	Tipperary champions
Football:	-	-	4
Hurling:	-	-	1

CJ Kickhams Mullinahone GAA club is a Gaelic Athletic Association located in Mullinahone, south County Tipperary, Ireland, close to the border with County Kilkenny. The club is named in honour of Charles J. Kickham, "Poet and Patriot", who was born in the village. The club competes in fixtures organised by the South Tipperary divisional board and Tipperary county board.

== History ==
CJ Kickhams Mullinahone GAA club, for most of its existence, has been a traditional Gaelic football club, winning many county senior football championships in the early 20th century. However, hurling enjoyed a resurgence in the 1990s, culminating with victory in the County Senior Hurling Championship in 2002. The senior hurling team has challenged for honours every year since their golden year.

== Honours ==
- Tipperary Senior Football Championship (4)
  - 1912, 1913, 1926, 1929
- South Tipperary Senior Football Championship (6)
  - 1913, 1916, 1919, 1926, 1929, 1945
- Mid Tipperary Senior Football Championship (2)
  - 1917, 1930
- Tipperary Senior Hurling Championship (1)
  - 2002
- Séamus Ó Riain Cup (1)
  - 2020
- South Tipperary Senior Hurling Championship (14)
  - 1993, 1995, 1997, 1999, 2002, 2003, 2004, 2006, 2009, 2011, 2012, 2014, 2016, 2019
- Tipperary Intermediate Football Championship (3)
  - 2000, 2006, 2011
- Munster Intermediate Club Football Championship Runners-up
  - 2011
- South Tipperary Intermediate Football Championship (7)
  - 1965, 1989, 1996, 2000, 2005, 2011, 2015
- South Tipperary Intermediate Hurling Championship (2)
  - 1990, 1991
- Tipperary Junior Football Championship (3)
  - 1916, 1973, 2019
- Munster Junior Club Football Championship Runners-up
  - 2019
- South Tipperary Junior Football Championship (4)
  - 1961, 1972, 1973, 2018
- South Tipperary Junior B Football Championship (1)
  - 2010
- Tipperary Junior A Hurling Championship (1)
  - 1989
- South Tipperary Junior Hurling Championship (4)
  - 1940, 1979, 1985, 1989
- South Tipperary Junior B Hurling Championship (5)
  - 2002, 2009, 2015, 2017, 2018
- South Tipperary Under-21 Football Championship (2)
  - 1970 (with St. Patrick's, as Slievenamon), 1978 (with Killenaule as Young Irelands)
- Tipperary Under-21 B Football Championship (2)
  - 1988, 2008
- South Tipperary Under-21 B Football Championship (5)
  - 1988, 1996, 2001, 2008, 2010
- Tipperary Under-21 Hurling Championship (1)
  - 1989
- South Tipperary Under-21 Hurling Championship (9)
  - 1976(with Killenaule as Young Irelands), 1978 (with Killenaule as Young Irelands), 1979 (with Killenaule as Eire Og), 1980 (with Killenaule as Eire Og), 1989, 1996 (as Mullinahone Gaels), 1999, 2021, 2022
- Tipperary Under-21 B Hurling Championship (2)
  - 1988, 2008
- South Tipperary Under-21 B Hurling Championship (4)
  - 1988, 2005, 2006, 2008
- South Tipperary Minor Football Championship (3)
  - 1956, 1970 (with St. Patrick's, as Slievenamon), 1977 (with Killenaule as Young Irelands)
- Tipperary Minor B Football Championship (1)
  - 2006
- South Tipperary Minor B Football Championship (4)
  - 1996, 2000, 2006, 2018
- Tipperary Minor Hurling Championship (2)
  - 2011, 2023
- South Tipperary Minor hurling Championship (6)
  - 1960 (with Ballingarry), 1962 (with Ballingarry), 1963 (with Ballingarry), 1996, 2011, 2019
- South Tipperary Minor B Hurling Championship (3)
  - 1990, 2004, 2018

== Notable players ==
- Eoin Kelly - who was a member of the Tipperary team that won the All-Ireland Senior Hurling Championship in 2001, and who captained Tipperary to its next win in 2010.
- Paul Kelly
- John Leahy
