= Toomevara GAA =

Gaelic games club in County Tipperary, Ireland

Toomevara
- Tuaim Uí Mheára
- Founded: 1885
- County: Tipperary
- Colours: Green and Gold
- Grounds: St. Michael's Park
- Coordinates: 52°51′02.19″N 8°02′27.94″W

Playing kits
Standard colours

Senior Club Championships
| | All Ireland | Munster champions | Tipperary champions |
|---|---|---|---|
| Hurling: | - | 3 | 21 |

Toomevara GAA is a Gaelic Athletic Association club located in the parish of Toomevara in County Tipperary, Ireland. The club is almost exclusively concerned with hurling. The club is a part of North Tipperary GAA.

== Honours ==
- Munster Senior Club Hurling Championships: 3
  - 1993, 2004, 2006
- Tipperary Senior Hurling Championships: 21
  - 1890, 1910, 1912, 1913, 1914, 1919, 1923, 1930, 1931, 1960, 1992, 1993, 1994, 1998, 1999, 2000, 2001, 2003, 2004, 2006, 2008
- North Tipperary Senior Hurling Championships 33
  - 1910, 1911, 1912, 1913, 1916, 1917, 1918, 1919, 1922, 1923, 1925, 1926, 1927, 1928, 1929, 1930, 1931, 1946, 1958, 1960, 1961, 1962, 1991, 1994, 1995, 1997, 1999, 2000, 2002, 2003, 2006, 2010, 2011
- Séamus Ó Riain Cups 1
  - 2017
- Tipperary Intermediate Hurling Championships 1
  - 1984
- North Tipperary Intermediate Hurling Championships 3
  - 1944, 1955, 1984
- Tipperary Junior A Hurling Championship 2
  - 1913, 1997
- North Tipperary Junior A Hurling Championships 13
  - 1910, 1911, 1912, 1958, 1991, 1997, 2007, 2010, 2017, 2018, 2019, 2020, 2022
- Tipperary Junior B Hurling Championship 3
  - 1995, 2000, 2005
  - North Tipperary Junior B Hurling Championship 5
  - 1993, 1995, 2000, 2005, 2010
- North Tipperary Junior C Hurling Championship 1 2022
- North Tipperary Junior A Football Championship 3
  - 1972, 1973, 1982
- Tipperary Under-21 A Hurling Championship 5
  - 1985, 1986, 1990, 1995, 2005
  - North Tipperary Under-21 A Hurling Championship 12
  - 1967, 1985, 1986, 1990, 1995, 1996, 1998, 2000, 2001, 2005, 2016, 2018
- North Tipperary Under-19 A Hurling Championship 2
  - 2023, 2024
- Tipperary Minor A Hurling Championship 3
  - 1986, 1987, 1997
- North Tipperary Minor A Hurling Championship 15
  - 1932, 1937, 1954, 1956, 1981, 1982, 1985, 1986, 1987, 1993, 1994, 1995, 1996, 1997, 1998
- North Tipperary Minor B Hurling Championship 2
  - 1979, 2007

== Notable players ==
- Willie Ryan Tipperary Senior hurling captain
- David Young 2010 All-Ireland Senior Hurling Championship winner. 2013 All-Ireland Intermediate Hurling Championship winning captain.
- Benny Dunne 2010 All-Ireland Senior Hurling Championship winner. Tipperary Senior hurling captain
- Tommy Dunne 2001 All-Ireland Senior Hurling Championship winning captain. 2001 All-Star Hurler of the Year, Texaco Hurler of the Year and GPA Hurler of the Year. Three time All-Star winner.
- Matt Hassett 1961 All-Ireland Senior Hurling Championship winning captain.
- John Haugh Three time All-Ireland Senior Hurling Championship winner.
- Garrett Howard Three time All-Ireland Senior Hurling Championship winner with Limerick. Two time All-Ireland Senior Hurling Championship winner with Dublin.
- Martin Kennedy (hurler) Two time All-Ireland Senior Hurling Championship winner. All-Ireland Junior Hurling Championship winner. Tipperary — Hurling Team of the Millennium
- John O'Brien Two time All-Ireland Senior Hurling Championship winner. Tipperary Senior hurling captain.
- Phil Shanahan Three time All-Ireland Senior Hurling Championship winner.
- Paddy O'Brien All-Ireland Senior Hurling Championship winner.
- Jer Collison All-Ireland Senior Hurling Championship winner.
- George Frend 1993–94 National Hurling League winning captain.
- Jody Grace Two time All-Ireland Junior Hurling Championship winner. 1993 Munster Senior Club Hurling Championship winning captain.
- Joey McLoughney All-Ireland Minor Hurling Championship winner. All-Ireland Intermediate Hurling Championship winner.
- Michael Nolan All-Ireland Under-21 Hurling Championship winner.
- Matt O'Gara Two time All-Ireland Senior Hurling Championship winner. All-Ireland Minor Hurling Championship winner.
- Roger Ryan All-Ireland Senior Hurling Championship winner.
- Tom Ryan Two time All-Ireland Senior Hurling Championship winner. All-Ireland Minor Hurling Championship winner.
- Darragh McCarthy Minor, Under-20, and Senior All-Ireland winner.
