= Philip Shanahan (hurler) =

Irish hurler (born 1992)

Personal information
- Native name: Pilib Ó Seancháin (Irish)
- Born: 1974 (age 51–52) Toomevara, County Tipperary, Ireland

Sport
- Sport: Hurling
- Position: Left wing-back
Club
- Years: Club
- Toomevara
Club titles
- Tipperary titles: 8
- Munster titles: 2
- All-Ireland Titles: 0
Inter-county
- Years: County
- 1994: Tipperary
Inter-county titles
- Munster titles: 0
- All-Irelands: 0
- NHL: 1
- All Stars: 0

Philip Shanahan (born 1974) is an Irish former hurler. At club level, he played with Toomevara and also lined out at inter-county level with various Tipperary teams.

== Career ==
At club level, Shanahan first played hurling at juvenile and underage levels with Toomevara, winning numerous championship titles from under-12 up to under-21 level. He progressed to senior level and was part of the Toomevera team that won three successive Tipperary SHC medals from 1992 to 1994. Shanahan also claimed a Munster Club SHC title before later losing the 1994 All-Ireland Club SHC final to Sarsfields.

Shanahan captained Toomevara to the Tipperary SHC title in 1998. His club career subsequently saw him win a further four Tipperary SHC titles in five seasons between 2000 and 2004. Shanahan ended his club career by winning a second Munster Club SHC medal after a one-point defeat of Mount Sion in 1994.

At inter-county level, Shanahan first appeared for Tipperary during a two-year tenure with the minor team. He won a Munster MHC medal before appearing in a defeat by Kilkenny in the 1991 All-Ireland MHC final. Shanahan later spent three seasons with the under-21 team and ended his underage career with an All-Ireland U21HC medal after a defeat of Kilkenny in the final. He was also part of the senior team during their National Hurling League-winning campaign in 1994.

== Personal life ==
His uncle, Phil Shanahan, won three All-Ireland SHC medals with Tipperary, while his father, Tom Shanahan, also lined out with Tipperary.

== Honours ==
Toomevara

- Munster Senior Club Hurling Championship: 1993, 2004
- Tipperary Senior Hurling Championship: 1992, 1993, 1994, 1998 (c), 2000, 2001, 2003, 2004
- Tipperary Under-21 A Hurling Championship; 1995

Tipperary

- National Hurling League: 1993–94
- All-Ireland Under-21 Hurling Championship: 1995
- Munster Under-21 Hurling Championship: 1995
- Munster Minor Hurling Championship: 1991
