= Pat King (hurler) =

Irish hurler

Personal information
- Born: 1965 (age 60–61) Toomevara, County Tipperary, Ireland
- Occupation: Factory worker

Sport
- Sport: Hurling
- Position: Midfield
Club
- Years: Club
- Toomevara
Club titles
- Tipperary titles: 5
- Munster titles: 1
- All-Ireland Titles: 0
Inter-county
Years	County	Apps (scores)
1986; 1994-1995	Tipperary	1 (0-00)
Inter-county titles
- Munster titles: 0
- All-Irelands: 0
- NHL: 1
- All Stars: 0

Patrick King (born 1964) is an Irish former hurler.He played with Toomevara at club level and also lined out at inter-county level with the Tipperary senior hurling team.

== Career ==
King first played hurling at juvenile and underage levels with the Toomevara club, winning numerous championship titles from under-12 up to under-21 level. He enjoyed his first success at adult level when he was part of the Toomevera team that won the Tipperary IHC title in 1984. King later won three successive Tipperary SHC medals from 1992 to 1994. The second of these victories was later converted into a Munster Club SHC title, before later losing the 1994 All-Ireland club final to Sarsfields. King added further Tipperary SHC titles to his collection in 1998 and 1999, before ending his career back with the club's intermediate team.

King never played at minor or under-21 levels with Tipperary, however, his performances at club level resulted in a call-up to the senior team for the 1986 season. He was later dropped from the panel but earned a recall in 1994 and won a National League medal on the field of play that year. King made his only Munster SHC appearance in a defeat by Clare that season.

In retirement from playing, King became involved in team management and coaching. He has served as a selector at various times with the Toomevara senior team, including during the club's Tipperary SHC-winning season in 2004.

== Honours ==
=== Player ===
Toomevara

- Munster Senior Club Hurling Championship: 1993
- Tipperary Senior Hurling Championship: 1992, 1993, 1994, 1998, 1999
- North Tipperary Senior Hurling Championship: 1991, 1994, 1995, 1997, 1999
- Tipperary Intermediate Hurling Championship: 1984
- Tipperary Under-21 A Hurling Championship: 1985

Tipperary

- National Hurling League: 1993–94

=== Management ===
Toomevara

- Tipperary Senior Hurling Championship: 2004
