= Declan O'Meara =

Irish hurler (born 1970)

Personal information
- Born: 1964 (age 61–62) Toomevara, County Tipperary, Ireland
- Occupation: Carpenter

Sport
- Sport: Hurling
- Position: Left corner-back
Club
- Years: Club
- Toomevara
Club titles
- Tipperary titles: 3
- Munster titles: 1
- All-Ireland Titles: 0
Inter-county
Years	County	Apps (scores)
1993	Tipperary	0 (0-00)
Inter-county titles
- Munster titles: 1
- All-Irelands: 0
- NHL: 0
- All Stars: 0

Declan O'Meara (born 1970) is an Irish former hurler. At club level he played with Toomevara, and also lined out at inter-county level with various Tipperary teams.

== Career ==
O'Meara first played hurling at juvenile and underage levels with the Toomevara club, winning numerous championship titles from under-12 up to under-21 level. He later won three successive Tipperary SHC medals from 1992 to 1994. The second of these victories was later converted into a Munster Club SHC title, before later losing the 1994 All-Ireland club final to Sarsfields.

Success at underage level with his club resulted in O'Meara being called up to the Tipperary minor team. He captained the team during the 1988 Munster MHC. He later lined out with the under-21 team. O'Meara was a member of the extended senior team during Tipperary's Munster SHC-winning campaign in 1993.

== Honours ==
Toomevara

- Munster Senior Club Hurling Championship: 1993
- Tipperary Senior Hurling Championship: 1992, 1993, 1994
- North Tipperary Senior Hurling Championship: 1991, 1994, 1995, 1997
- Tipperary Under-21 A Hurling Championship: 1990
- Tipperary Minor A Hurling Championship; 1986, 1987

Tipperary

- Munster Senior Hurling Championship: 1993

Sporting positions
Preceded by Michael O'Meara	Tipperary minor hurling team captains 1988	Succeeded by Raymie Ryan
