= Michael Nolan (hurler) =

Irish hurler (born 1968)

Personal information
- Born: 1968 (age 57–58) Toomevara, County Tipperary, Ireland
- Occupation: postman

Sport
- Sport: Hurling
- Position: Centre-forward
Club
- Years: Club
- Toomevara
Club titles
- Tipperary titles: 3
- Munster titles: 1
Inter-county
| Years | County | Apps (scores) |
| 1993-1994 | Tipperary | 1 (0-00) |
Inter-county titles
- Munster titles: 0
- All-Irelands: 0
- NHL: 2
- All Stars: 0

Michael Nolan (born 1968) is an Irish former hurler. At club level he played with Toomevara, and also lined out at inter-county level with various Tipperary teams.

== Career ==
Cottrell first played hurling at juvenile and underage levels with the Toomevara club, winning numerous divisional championship titles before claiming both Tipperary MAHC and U21HC titles in 1986. He quickly progressed to adult level and won three successive Tipperary SHC medals from 1992 to 1994. The second of these victories was later converted into a Munster Club SHC title, before later losing the 1994 All-Ireland club final to Sarsfields.

Nolan first appeared on the inter-county scene for Tipperary as a member of the minor team during their unsuccessful 1986 season. He immediately progressed to the under-21 team and was corner-forward on the team that beat Offaly to win the All-Ireland U21HC title in 1989. By that stage, Nolan had already appeared for the senior team and was part of the team that won the National League Division 2 in 1987. After a period away from the team he was recalled and claimed a National Hurling League Division 1 title in 1994. Nolan made his sole Munster SHC appearance that season.

== Honours ==
Toomevara

- Munster Senior Club Hurling Championship: 1993
- Tipperary Senior Hurling Championship: 1992, 1993, 1994
- North Tipperary Senior Hurling Championship: 1991, 1994
- Tipperary Under-21 A Hurling Championship: 1986
- Tipperary Minor A Hurling Championship: 1986

Tipperary

- National Hurling League Division 1: 1993–94
- National Hurling League Division 2: 1986–87
- All-Ireland Under-21 Hurling Championship: 1989
- Munster Under-21 Hurling Championship: 1989
