= Jody Grace =

Irish hurler (born 1967)

Personal information
- Born: 9 November 1967 (age 58) Toomevara, County Tipperary, Ireland
- Occupation: Farmer
- Height: 6 ft 0 in (183 cm)

Sport
- Sport: Hurling
- Position: Goalkeeper
Club
- Years: Club
- 1984-1997: Toomevara
Club titles
- Tipperary titles: 3
- Munster titles: 1
Inter-county
Years	County	Apps (scores)
1991-1995	Tipperary	1 (0-00)
Inter-county titles
- Munster titles: 2
- All-Irelands: 1
- NHL: 1
- All Stars: 0

Jody Grace (born 9 November 1967) is an Irish former hurler. At club level he played with Toomevara, and also lined out at inter-county level with various Tipperary teams.

== Career ==
Grace first played hurling at juvenile and underage levels with the Toomevara club, winning numerous championship titles from under-12 up to under-21 level. He was just 17-years-old when he was part of the Toomevera team that won the Tipperary IHC title in 1984. Grace later won three successive Tipperary SHC medals from 1992 to 1994. He was captain of the team for the second of these victories, when Toomevara also claimed the Munster Club SHC title before later losing the 1994 All-Ireland club final to Sarsfields.

Grace first appeared on the inter-county scene with Tipperary as goalkeeper on the minor team beaten by Cork in the 1985 Munster final. He later spent one season with the under-21 team. Grace was goalkeeper for the Tipperary junior team that beat Galway in the 1989 All-Ireland junior final. He earned promotion to the senior team following this victory and was sub-goalkeeper to Ken Hogan when Tipperary won the All-Ireland SHC title after beating Kilkenny in the 1991 final.

Grace continued as sub-goalkeeper for a number of seasons and claimed a second Munster SHC medal in 1993 before winning a National League medal on the field of play in 1994. He was first-choice goalkeeper that season and made his only championship appearance in a defeat by Clare. Grace broke a finger prior to the start of the 1995 Munster SHC, an injury which saw him being replaced by Brendan Cummins as goalkeeper.

== Honours ==
Toomevara

- Munster Senior Club Hurling Championship: 1993 (c)
- Tipperary Senior Hurling Championship: 1992, 1993 (c), 1994
- North Tipperary Senior Hurling Championship: 1991, 1994, 1995, 1997
- Tipperary Intermediate Hurling Championship: 1984
- Tipperary Under-21 A Hurling Championship; 1986, 1987

Tipperary

- All-Ireland Senior Hurling Championship: 1991
- Munster Senior Hurling Championship: 1991, 1993
- National Hurling League: 1993–94
- All-Ireland Junior Hurling Championship: 1989
- Munster Junior Hurling Championship: 1989
