= 1995 Tipperary Senior Hurling Championship =

Annual hurling competition season

- Dates: 16 September – 15 October 1995
- Teams: 8
- Sponsor: Nenagh Co-Op
- Champions: Nenagh Éire Óg (1st title); Conor O'Donovan (captain); Pad Joe Whelehan (manager)
- Runners-up: Boherlahan-Dualla; Michael Murphy (captain); Aonghus Ryan (manager)

Tournament statistics
- Matches played: 7
- Goals scored: 28 (4 per match)
- Points scored: 191 (27.29 per match)
- Top scorer(s): Michael Cleary (1-22)

The 1995 Tipperary Senior Hurling Championship was the 104th staging of the Tipperary Senior Hurling Championship since its establishment by the Tipperary County Board in 1887. The championship began on 16 September 1995 and ended on 15 October 1995.

Toomevara were the defending champions, however, they were defeated by Boherlahan-Dualla at the semi-final stage.

On 15 October 1995, Nenagh Éire Óg won the championship after a 2–25 to 2–08 defeat of Boherlahan-Dualla in the final at Semple Stadium. It remains their only championship title.

== Qualification ==
Division	Championship	Champions	Runners-up
Mid	Mid Tipperary Senior Hurling Championship	Boherlahan-Dualla	Loughmore-Castleiney
North	North Tipperary Senior Hurling Championship	Toomevara	Borris-Ileigh
South	South Tipperary Senior Hurling Championship	Mullinahone	Carrick Davins
West	West Tipperary Senior Hurling Championship	Cashel King Cormacs	Kickhams

== Results ==
=== Quarter-finals ===
16 September 1995 Quarter-final	Cashel King Cormacs	1-18 - 1-11	Loughmore-Castleiney	Semple Stadium
	T Moloney 0-10, C Bonnar 1-1, J O'Donoghue 0-2, J Ryan 0-2, A Bonnar 0-2, S O'Donoghue 0-1.		N Morris 0-5, D Laffan 0-4, P McGrath 1-0, M McGrath 0-1, J Cormack 0-1.

16 September 1995 Quarter-final	Boherlahan-Dualla	2-12 - 1-11	Kickhams	Semple Stadium
	L Maher 1-1, A Flanagan 0-4, P Delaney 1-0, P O'Dwyer 0-3, M Murphy 0-2, D Ryan 0-1, G Flanagan 0-1.		A Butler 1-4, J Cormack 0-4, G Butler 0-2, M O'Brien 0-1.

16 September 1995 Quarter-final	Toomevara	4-16 - 3-05	Carrick Davins	St. Michael's Park
	M Bevans 3-1, Tommy Dunne 0-7, K Kennedy 1-0, K Dunne 0-3, T Carroll 0-2, M Murphy 0-1, L Flaherty 0-1, T Delaney 0-1.		B Cronin 2-1, D Waters 1-0, J Waters 0-2, T Power 0-1, S Harris 0-1.

23 September 1995 Quarter-final	Nenagh Éire Óg	2-16 - 3-09	Mullinahone	Semple Stadium
	M Cleary 0-8, J Heffernan 1-1, K Tucker 0-4, D Quinn 1-0, E Tucker 0-1, J O'Donoghue 0-1, R Tomlinson 0-1.		J Leahy 2-7, M Tobin 1-1, P Croke 0-1.

=== Semi-finals ===
1 October 1995 Semi-final	Nenagh Éire Óg	2-14 - 2-13	Cashel King Cormacs	Semple Stadium
	M Cleary 1-6, E Tucker 0-4, R Tomlinson 1-0, J Heffernan 0-2, K Tucker 0-2.		T Moloney 1-11, A Bonnar 1-1, S O'Donoghue 0-1.

1 October 1995 Semi-final	Boherlahan-Dualla	2-11 - 1-12	Toomevara	Semple Stadium
	A Flanagan 1-3, L Maher 1-1, P O'Dwyer 0-3, D Ryan 0-1, M Ferncombe 0-1, P Delaney 0-1, C Gleeson 0-1.		Tommy Dunne 0-5, K Kennedy 1-1, Terry Dunne 0-2, M Bevans 0-2, T Carroll 0-1, M Murphy 0-1.

=== Final ===
15 October 1995 Final	Nenagh Éire Óg	2-25 - 2-08	Boherlahan-Dualla	Semple Stadium
	M Cleary 0-8, J Heffernan 1-3, K Tucker 0-6, R Tomlinson 1-1, EE Tucker 0-3, C Bonar 0-1, D Quinn 0-1, D O'Meara 0-1, R Burns 0-1.		P O'Dwyer 1-3, P Delaney 1-0, M Ferncombe 0-3, G Flanagan 0-1, S Murphy 0-1.	Referee: TJ Corby (St. Mary's)

== Championship statistics ==
=== Top scorers ===
Top scorers overall

Rank	Player	Club	Tally	Total	Matches	Average
1	Michael Cleary	Nenagh Éire Óg	1-22	25	3	8.33
2	Timmy Moloney	Cashel King Cormacs	1-21	24	2	12.00
3	John Leahy	Mullinahone	2-07	13	1	13.00
4	Michael Bevans	Toomevara	3-03	12		6.00
4	John Heffernan	Nenagh Éire Óg	2-06	12	2	6.00
4	Philip O'Dwyer	Boherlahan-Dualla	1-09	12	3	4.00
4	Tommy Dunne	Toomevara	0-12	12	2	6.00
4	Kevin Tucker	Nenagh Éire Óg	0-12	12	3	4.00
9	Aidan Flanagan	Boherlahan-Dualla	1-07	10	3	3.33
10	Liam Maher	Boherlahan-Dualla	2-02	8	3	2.66
10	Robbie Tomlinson	Nenagh Éire Óg	2-02	8	3	2.66
10	Eddie Tucker	Nenagh Éire Óg	0-08	8	3	2.66

Top scorers in a single game

Rank	Player	Club	Tally	Total	Opposition
1	Timmy Moloney	Cashel King Cormacs	1-11	14	Nenagh Éire Óg
2	John Leahy	Mullinahone	2-07	13	Nenagh Éire Óg
3	Michael Bevans	Toomevara	3-01	10	Carrick Davins
3	Timmy Moloney	Cashel King Cormacs	0-10	10	Loughmore-Castleiney
5	Michael Cleary	Nenagh Éire Óg	1-06	9	Cashel King Cormacs
6	Michael Cleary	Nenagh Éire Óg	0-08	8	Mullinahone
6	Michael Cleary	Nenagh Éire Óg	0-08	8	Boherlahan-Dualla
8	Brendan Cronin	Carrick Davins	2-01	7	Toomevara
8	Aidan Butler	Kickhams	1-04	7	Boherlahan-Dualla
8	Tommy Dunne	Toomevara	0-07	7	Carrick Davins

=== Miscellaneous ===
- Nenagh Éire Óg won the championship for the first time.
- Boherlahan-Dualla qualify for the final for the first time since 1953.
