= List of Tipperary under-20 hurling team captains =

This article lists players who have captained the Tipperary under-20 hurling team in the Munster Under-20 Hurling Championship and the All-Ireland Under-20 Hurling Championship. Prior to 2019, the competition had an under-21 age limit.

== List of captains ==
Year	Player	Club	National	Provincial
1989	Declan Ryan	Clonoulty–Rossmore	All-Ireland Hurling Final winning captain	Munster Hurling Final winning captain
1990	John Leahy	Mullinahone		Munster Hurling Final winning captain
1991	George Frend	Toomevara		
1992	Timmy Moloney	Cashel King Cormacs		
1993	John Doughan	Moneygall		
1994	Robbie Tomlinson	Nenagh Éire Óg		
1995	Brian Horgan	Knockavilla–Donaskeigh Kickhams	All-Ireland Hurling Final winning captain	Munster Hurling Final winning captain
1996	Terry Dunne	Toomevara		
1997	Paul Shelley	Killenaule		
1998	Philip Rabbitte	Borris–Ileigh		
1999	William Hickey	Boherlahan–Dualla		Munster Hurling Final winning captain
2000	Shane McDermott	Cappawhite		
2001	Séamus Butler	Drom & Inch		
2002	Damien Young	Drom & Inch		
2003	Eoin Kelly	Mullinahone		Munster Hurling Final winning captain
2004	Diarmaid FitzGerald	Roscrea		Munster Hurling Final winning captain
2005				
2006	David Young	Toomevara		Munster Hurling Final winning captain
2007	Darragh Egan	Kiladangan		
2008	Séamus Hennessy	Kilruane MacDonaghs		Munster Hurling Final winning captain
2009	Pa Bourke	Thurles Sarsfields		
2010	Pádraic Maher	Thurles Sarsfields	All-Ireland Hurling Final winning captain	Munster Hurling Final winning captain
2011	Noel McGrath	Loughmore-Castleiney		
2012	John O'Dwyer	Killenaule		
2013	Niall O'Meara	Kilruane MacDonaghs		
2014	Jason Forde	Silvermines		
2015	Bill Maher	Kilsheelan-Kilcash		
2016	Ronan Maher	Thurles Sarsfields		
2017	Andrew Coffey	Nenagh Éire Óg		
2018	Colin English	Fr. Sheehys	All-Ireland Hurling Final winning captain	
2019	Craig Morgan	Kilruane MacDonaghs	All-Ireland Hurling Final winning captain	Munster Hurling Final winning captain
2020	Eoghan Connolly	Cashel King Cormacs		
2021	Kevin Maher	Borris–Ileigh		
2022	John Campion	Drom & Inch		
2023	Darragh Stakelum	Thurles Sarsfields		
2024	Ben Currivan	Golden–Kilfeacle		Munster Hurling Final winning captain
2025	Sam O'Farrell	Nenagh Éire Óg	All-Ireland Hurling Final winning captain	Munster Hurling Final winning captain
2026	Oisín O'Donoghue	Cashel King Cormacs		

== See also ==
- List of Tipperary senior hurling team captains
