= 1996 Tipperary Senior Hurling Championship =

Annual hurling competition season

- Dates: 21 September – 27 October 1996
- Teams: 8
- Sponsor: Nenagh Co-Op
- Champions: Boherlahan-Dualla (11th title); Philly Ryan (captain); Dan O'Donnell (manager)
- Runners-up: Toomevara; Pat King (captain); Seán Stack (manager)

Tournament statistics
- Matches played: 7
- Goals scored: 22 (3.14 per match)
- Points scored: 156 (22.29 per match)
- Top scorer(s): Philip O'Dwyer (6-10)

The 1996 Tipperary Senior Hurling Championship was the 105th staging of the Tipperary Senior Hurling Championship since its establishment by the Tipperary County Board in 1887. The championship began on 21 September 1996 and ended 27 October 1996.

Nenagh Éire Óg were the defending champions, however, they failed to qualify after being defeated by Lorrha-Dorrha in the first round of the North Championship.

On 27 October 1996, Boherlahan-Dualla won the championship after a 1–16 to 2–12 defeat of Toomevara in the final at Semple Stadium. It was their 11th championship title overall and their first title since 1941. It remains their last championship triumph.

== Qualification ==
Division	Championship	Champions	Runners-up
Mid	Mid Tipperary Senior Hurling Championship	Boherlahan-Dualla	Thurles Sarsfields
North	North Tipperary Senior Hurling Championship	Newport	Lorrha
South	South Tipperary Senior Hurling Championship	Ballingarry	Killenaule
West	West Tipperary Senior Hurling Championship	Clonoulty-Rossmore	Cashel King Cormacs

== Results ==
=== Quarter-finals ===
21 September 1996 Quarter-final	Thurles Sarsfields	2-13 - 1-07	Killenaule	Littleton Grounds
	J Enright 0-8, S Quinn 2-0, E Walsh 0-3, E Enright 0-1, M O'Dowd 0-1.		T Shelly 1-3, K Laurence 0-3, D O'Connell 0-1.	Referee: M Cahill (Kilruane MacDonaghs)

5 October 1996 Quarter-final	Boherlahan-Dualla	2-18 - 1-08	Ballingarry	Clonmel GAA Ground
	T O'Dwyer 1-4, N Ferncombe 1-4, A Flanagan 0-4, G Flanagan 0-3, B O'Dwyer 0-1, M Murphy 0-1, JJ McGrath 0-1.		L Cahill 1-5, P Ivors 0-1, S Butler 0-1, M McGrath 0-1.

6 October 1996 Quarter-final	Toomevara	2-17 - 0-09	Clonoulty-Rossmore	Páirc Shíleáin
	K McCormack 0-7, L Nolan 1-2, M Bevans 1-2, K Dunne 0-2, G Frend 0-1, K Kennedy 0-1, L Flattery 0-1.		D Ryan 0-5, M Kennedy 0-3, M Quirke 0-1.

6 October 1996 Quarter-final	Cashel King Cormacs	2-11 - 1-11	Newport	Páirc Shíleáin
	T Moloney 1-9, TJ Connolly 1-1, Conal Bonnar 0-1.		G Bradley 0-6, J Ryan 1-1, D Ryan 0-1, J O'Mahony 0-1, T Moylan 0-1, P Coleman 0-1.

=== Semi-finals ===
13 October 1996 Semi-final	Toomevara	1-17 - 0-06	Thurles Sarsfields	Semple Stadium
	Tommy Dunne 0-4, K Dunne 0-4, K McCormack 0-4, L Nolan 1-0, M Bevans 0-2, P King 0-1, T Delaney 0-1, Terry Dunne 0-1.		J Enright 0-3, C Maher 0-2, E Enright 0-1.	Referee: T Lonergan

3 October 1996 Semi-final	Boherlahan-Dualla	5-11 - 2-08	Cashel King Cormacs	Semple Stadium
	P Dwyer 4-3, M Murphy 1-2, G Flanagan 0-2, A Flanagan 0-2, L Maher 0-2.		TJ Connolly 1-3, R Ryan 0-2, T Moloney 0-2, Conal Bonnar 0-1.

=== Final ===
27 October 1996 Final	Boherlahan-Dualla	1-16 - 2-12	Toomevara	Semple Stadium
	P O'Dwyer 1-3, A Flanagan 0-6, G Flanagan 0-3, M Ferncombe 0-1, JJ McGrath 0-1, B O'Dwyer 0-1, L Maher 0-1.		K Kennedy 2-0, K McCormack 0-5, Terry Dunne 0-2, M O'Meara 0-1, M Bevans 0-1, Tommy Dunne 0-1, L Nolan 0-1, K Dunne 0-1.	Referee: W Barrett (Ardfinnan)

== Championship statistics ==
=== Top scorers ===
Top scorers overall

Rank	Player	Club	Tally	Total	Matches	Average
1	Philip O'Dwyer	Boherlahan-Dualla	6-10	28	3	9.33
2	Kevin McCormack	Toomevara	0-16	16	3	5.33
3	Timmy Moloney	Cashel King Cormacs	1-11	14	2	7.00
4	Aidan Flanagan	Boherlahan-Dualla	0-12	12	3	4.00
5	Johnny Enright	Thurles Sarsfields	0-11	11	2	5.50
6	T. J. Connolly	Cashel King Cormacs	2-04	10	2	5.00
7	Liam Nolan	Toomevara	2-03	9	3	3.00
8	Liam Cahill	Ballingarry	1-05	8	1	8.00
8	Michael Ferncombe	Boherlahan-Dualla	1-05	8	3	2.66
8	Michael Bevans	Toomevara	1-05	8	3	2.66
8	Ger Flanagan	Boherlahan-Dualla	0-08	8	3	2.66

Top scorers in a single game

Rank	Player	Club	Tally	Total	Opposition
1	Philip O'Dwyer	Boherlahan-Dualla	4-03	15	Cashel King Cormacs
2	Timmy Moloney	Cashel King Cormacs	1-09	12	Newport
3	Liam Cahill	Ballingarry	1-05	8	Boherlahan-Dualla
3	Johnny Enright	Thurles Sarsfields	0-08	8	Killenaule
5	Philip O'Dwyer	Boherlahan-Dualla	1-04	7	Ballingarry
5	Michael Ferncombe	Boherlahan-Dualla	1-04	7	Ballingarry
5	Kevin McCormack	Toomevara	0-07	7	Clonoulty-Rossmore
8	Séamus Quinn	Thurles Sarsfields	2-00	6	Killenaule
8	Kevin Kennedy	Toomevara	2-00	6	Boherlahan-Dualla
8	Tony Shelly	Killenaule	1-03	6	Thurles Sarsfields
8	T. J. Connolly	Cashel King Cormacs	1-03	6	Boherlahan-Dualla
8	Philip O'Dwyer	Boherlahan-Dualla	1-03	6	Toomevara
8	Aidan Flanagan	Boherlahan-Dualla	0-06	6	Toomevara
8	Ger Bradley	Newport	0-06	6	Cashel King Cormacs

=== Miscellaneous ===
- Boherlahan-Dualla win the title for the first time since 1941.
- Toomevara lose a final for the first time since 1961.
