= 1997 Tipperary Senior Hurling Championship =

Annual hurling competition season

- Dates: 4 October – 2 November 1997
- Teams: 8
- Sponsor: Nenagh Co-Op
- Champions: Clonoulty-Rossmore (3rd title); Noel Keane (captain); T. J. Ryan (manager)
- Runners-up: Mullinahone; Liam O'Connor (captain); Theo English (manager)

Tournament statistics
- Matches played: 8
- Goals scored: 23 (2.88 per match)
- Points scored: 198 (24.75 per match)
- Top scorer(s): John Leahy (0-22)

The 1997 Tipperary Senior Hurling Championship was the 106th staging of the Tipperary Senior Hurling Championship since its establishment by the Tipperary County Board in 1887. The championship began on 4 October 1997 and ended on 2 November 1997.

Boherlahan-Dualla were the defending champions, however, they were defeated by Clonoulty-Rossmore at the quarter-final stage.

On 2 November 1997, Clonoulty-Rossmore won the championship after a 0–17 to 1–12 defeat of Mullinahone in the final at Semple Stadium. It was their third championship title overall and their first title since 1989.

== Qualification ==
| Division | Championship | Champions | Runners-up |
|---|---|---|---|
| Mid | Mid Tipperary Senior Hurling Championship | Holycross-Ballycahill | Boherlahan-Dualla |
| North | North Tipperary Senior Hurling Championship | Toomevara | Borris-Ileigh |
| South | South Tipperary Senior Hurling Championship | Mullinahone | Ballingarry |
| West | West Tipperary Senior Hurling Championship | Kickhams | Cappawhite |

== Results ==
=== Quarter-finals ===
| 4 October 1997 Quarter-final | Holycross-Ballycahill | 1-09 - 0-12 | Borris-Ileigh | Páirc Shíleáin |
| | J Ferncombe 0-5, D Duggan 1-0, T Lanigan 0-2, D Burke 0-1, T Gleeson 0-1. | | C Stakelum 0-4, S Maher 0-2, A Ryan 0-2, T Stakelum 0-1, J Keane 0-1, A Walsh 0-1, M Hayes 0-1. | Referee: T Lonergan (Kilsheelan) |

| 5 October 1997 Quarter-final | Boherlahan-Dualla | 2-12 - 0-14 | Toomevara | MacDonagh Park |
| | P O'Dwyer 1-3, G Flanagan 0-4, M Murphy 1-0, L Maher 0-2, M Ferncombe 0-1, S Tarrant 0-1, T Lacey 0-1. | | K Dunne 0-7, T Dunne 0-4, K Kennedy 0-3. | Referee: W Barrett (Ardfinnan) |

| 5 October 1997 Quarter-final | Mullinahone | 1-20- 0-15 | Kickhams | Leahy Park |
| | J Leahy 0-7, B O'Meara 0-5, P Croke 1-0, D Maher 0-2, P Kelly 0-2, E Carey 0-2, M Tobin 0-1, E Kelly 0-1. | | A Butler 0-7, A Qualter 0-3, V Kelly 0-1, G Butler 0-1, J O'Brien 0-1, B Ryan 0-1, O Morrissey 0-1. | Referee: J McDonnell (Roscrea) |

| 11 October 1997 Quarter-final replay | Holycross-Ballycahill | 1-07 - 0-07 | Borris-Ileigh | Páirc Shíleáin |
| | D Duggan 1-0, T Gleeson 0-3, W Ryan 0-1, J Ferncombe 0-1, D Quinlan 0-1, D Burke 0-1. | | C Stakelum 0-3, S Maher 0-2, J Keane 0-1, A Ryan 0-1. | Referee: T Lonergan (Kilsheelan) |

| 12 October 1997 Quarter-final | Clonoulty-Rossmore | 4-09 - 1-10 | Ballingarry | Leahy Park |
| | D Ryan 2-3, J Ryan 1-1, M Kennedy 0-4, M Quirke 1-0, A Butler 0-1. | | L Cahill 1-2, D Shelly 0-4, P Ivors 0-3, D Lyons 0-1. | Referee: E Clohessy (Drom-Inch) |

=== Semi-finals ===
| 19 October 1997 Semi-final | Mullinahone | 1-20 - 3-11 | Holycross-Ballycahill | Semple Stadium |
| | J Leahy 0-8, P Kelly 0-6, M Tobin 1-0, P Croke 0-2, D Maher 0-2, B O'Meara 0-1, P Cahill 0-1. | | D Burke 1-3, J Ferncombe 1-2, T Lanigan 1-1, D Ryan 0-2, T Gleeson 0-1, N Ryan 0-1, M Lee 0-1. | Referee: M Cahill (Kilruane MacDonaghs) |

| 19 October 1997 Semi-final | Clonoulty-Rossmore | 4-12 - 4-11 | Boherlahan-Dualla | Semple Stadium |
| | D Ryan 3-1, M Quirke 1-2, M Kennedy 0-5, K Lanigan-Ryan 0-2, J Ryan 0-1, A Butler 0-1. | | A Flanagan 0-6, P O'Dwyer 1-2, G Flanagan 1-2, L Maher 1-1. | Referee: TJ Corby (Clonmel) |

=== Final ===
| 2 November 1997 Final | Clonoulty-Rossmore | 0-17 - 1-12 | Mullinahone | Semple Stadium |
| | M Kennedy 0-7, M Heffernan 0-4, M Quirke 0-2, D Ryan 0-2, N Keane 0-1, K Lanigan-Ryan 0-1. | | J Leahy 0-7, B O'Meara 1-0, P Kelly 0-2, P Croke 0-1, E Carey 0-1, D Maher 0-1. | Referee: M Cahill (Kilruane MacDonaghs) |

== Championship statistics ==
=== Top scorers ===
Top scorers overall

| Rank | Player | Club | Tally | Total | Matches | Average |
|---|---|---|---|---|---|---|
| 1 | John Leahy | Mullinahone | 0-22 | 22 | 3 | 7.33 |
| 2 | Declan Ryan | Clonoulty-Rossmore | 5-06 | 21 | 3 | 7.00 |
| 3 | Michael Kennedy | Clonoulty-Rossmore | 0-16 | 16 | 3 | 5.33 |
| 4 | Philip O'Dwyer | Boherlahan-Dualla | 2-05 | 11 | 2 | 5.50 |
| 4 | John Ferncombe | Holycross-Ballycahill | 1-08 | 11 | 3 | 3.66 |
| 6 | Maurice Quirke | Clonoulty-Rossmore | 2-04 | 10 | 3 | 3.33 |
| 6 | Paul Kelly | Mullinahone | 0-10 | 10 | 3 | 3.33 |
| 8 | Brian O'Meara | Mullinahone | 1-06 | 9 | 3 | 3.00 |
| 8 | Ger Flanagan | Boherlahan-Dualla | 1-06 | 9 | 2 | 4.50 |
| 10 | David Burke | Holycross-Ballycahill | 1-05 | 8 | 3 | 2.66 |

Top scorers in a single game

| Rank | Player | Club | Tally | Total | Opposition |
|---|---|---|---|---|---|
| 1 | Declan Ryan | Clonoulty-Rossmore | 3-01 | 10 | Boherlahan-Dualla |
| 2 | Declan Ryan | Clonoulty-Rossmore | 2-03 | 9 | Ballingarry |
| 3 | John Leahy | Mullinahone | 0-08 | 8 | Holycross-Ballycahill |
| 4 | Ken Dunne | Toomevara | 0-07 | 7 | Boherlahan-Dualla |
| 4 | John Leahy | Mullinahone | 0-07 | 7 | Kickhams |
| 4 | Aidan Butler | Kickhams | 0-07 | 7 | Mullinahone |
| 4 | Michael Kennedy | Clonoulty-Rossmore | 0-07 | 7 | Mullinahone |
| 4 | John Leahy | Mullinahone | 0-07 | 7 | Clonoulty-Rossmore |
| 9 | Philip O'Dwyer | Boherlahan-Dualla | 1-03 | 6 | Toomevara |
| 9 | David Burke | Holycross-Ballycahill | 1-03 | 6 | Mullinahone |
| 9 | Paul Kelly | Mullinahone | 0-06 | 6 | Holycross-Ballycahill |
| 9 | Aidan Flanagan | Boherlahan-Dualla | 0-06 | 6 | Clonoulty-Rossmore |

=== Miscellaneous ===
- Clonoulty-Rossmore win their first title since 1989.
- [[Mullinahone GAA|Mullinahone]] qualify for the final for the first time.
