= Kevin Kennedy (hurler) =

Irish hurler

Personal information
- Native name: Caoimhín Ó Cinnéide (Irish)
- Born: 1971 (age 54–55) Toomevara, County Tipperary, Ireland
- Occupation: Factory worker

Sport
- Sport: Hurling
- Position: Full-forward
Club
- Years: Club
- Toomevara
Club titles
- Tipperary titles: 3
- Munster titles: 1
- All-Ireland Titles: 0
Inter-county
Years	County	Apps (scores)
1996	Tipperary	2 (0-03)
Inter-county titles
- Munster titles: 0
- All-Irelands: 0
- NHL: 0
- All Stars: 0

Kevin Kennedy (born 1993) is an Irish former hurler. At club level, he played with Toomevara and also lined out at inter-county level with various Tipperary teams.

== Career ==
Kennedy first played hurling at juvenile and underage levels with the Toomevara club, winning numerous championship titles from under-12 up to under-21 level. He progressed to senior level and was part of the Toomevera team that won successive Tipperary SHC titles in 1993 and 1994. Kennedy also claimed a Munster Club SHC title before later losing the 1994 All-Ireland Club SHC final to Sarsfields. He won a third and final Tipperary SHC medal in 1998.

At inter-county level, Kennedy first appeared for Tipperary during a two-year tenure with the minor team. Performances at club level earned a call-up to the senior team in 1996.

== Honours ==
Toomevara

- Munster Senior Club Hurling Championship: 1993
- Tipperary Senior Hurling Championship: 1993, 1994, 1998
