= Liam McGrath (hurler, born 1974) =

Irish hurler

Personal information
- Native name: Liam Mac Craith (Irish)
- Born: 22 May 1974 (age 52) Burgess, County Tipperary, Ireland
- Height: 6 ft 1 in (185 cm)

Sport
- Sport: Hurling
- Position: Centre-forward
Club
- Years: Club
- Burgess
Club titles
- Tipperary titles: 0
Inter-county
Years	County	Apps (scores)
1994-1998	Tipperary	9 (0-06)
Inter-county titles
- Munster titles: 0
- All-Irelands: 0
- NHL: 1
- All Stars: 0

Liam McGrath (born 22 May 1974) is an Irish former hurler. At club level he played with Burgess and at inter-county level with the Tipperary senior hurling team.

== Career ==
McGrath was born into a family that had a long association with Tipperary hurling. His granduncle, Frank McGrath, played in the 1913 All-Ireland SHC final defeat by Kilkenny and later served as a coach and administrator.

At club level, McGrath first played hurling at juvenile and underage levels with the Burgess club. He progressed to adult level and won consecutive North Tipperary IHC titles in 1992 and 1993. The second of these divisional titles was subsequently converted into a Tipperary IHC title, following an 0–11 to 0–07 win over Upperchurch–Drombane in the final.

McGrath first appeared on the inter-county scene for Tipperary as a member of the minor team in 1992. He subsequently progressed to the under-21 team and was at centre-forward when Tipperary beat Kilkenny by 1-14 to 1-10 in the 1995 All-Ireland U21 HC final.

McGrath was still part of the under-21 team when he joined Tipperary's senior team during their successful 1993–94 National Hurling League campaign. He was a mainstay amongst the team's forwards in 1997 during Tipperary's run to the All-Ireland SHC final, which effectively ended with a defeat by Clare. McGrath's inter-county career ended in 1998.

== Honours ==
Burgess

- Tipperary Intermediate Hurling Championship (1): 1993
- North Tipperary Intermediate Hurling Championship (2): 1992, 1993

Tipperary

- National Hurling League (1): 1993–94
- All-Ireland Under-21 Hurling Championship (1): 1995
- Munster Under-21 Hurling Championship (1): 1995
