= 1998 Tipperary Senior Hurling Championship =

Annual hurling competition season

- Dates: 27 September – 1 November 1998
- Teams: 8
- Sponsor: Nenagh Co-Op
- Champions: Toomevara (14th title); Philip Shanahan (captain); Bertie Sherlock (manager)
- Runners-up: Clonoulty-Rossmore; Andrew Fryday (captain); Liam Kelly (manager)

Tournament statistics
- Matches played: 7
- Goals scored: 21 (3 per match)
- Points scored: 164 (23.43 per match)
- Top scorer(s): John Kennedy (1-19)

The 1998 Tipperary Senior Hurling Championship was the 107th staging of the Tipperary Senior Hurling Championship since its establishment by the Tipperary County Board in 1887. The championship began on 27 September 1998 and ended on 1 November 1998.

Clonoulty-Rossmore were the defending champions.

On 1 November 1998, Toomevara won the championship after a 0–16 to 1–10 defeat of Clonoulty-Rossmore in the final at Semple Stadium. It was their 14th championship title overall and their first title since 1994.

== Results ==
=== Quarter-finals ===
20 September 1998 Quarter-final	Nenagh Éire Óg	2-21 - 0-05	Carrick Swans	Seán Treacy Park
	J Kennedy 1-10, B O'Meara 1-2, E Tucker 0-3, K Tucker 0-2, J O'Donoghue 0-2 M Hackett 0-1, M Cleary 0-1.		K Maguire 0-2, J Grace 0-1, G Walsh 0-1, B Ryan 0-1.

20 September 1998 Quarter-final	Toomevara	3-14 - 3-09	Ballingarry	Seán Treacy Park
	K Kennedy 2-2, K Cummins 1-1, Tommy Dunne 0-4, K Dunne 0-4, P O'Brien 0-2, Terry Dunne 0-1.		L Cahill 1-5, D Shelly 1-1, G Ivors 1-1, J Lawlor 0-1, P Ivors 0-1.

27 September 1998 Quarter-final	Clonoulty-Rossmore	2-11 - 1-11	Boherlahan-Dualla	Leahy Park
	M Kennedy 0-5, M Quirke 1-1, M Heffernan 1-0, D Ryan 0-2, D Quirke 0-2, T Lanigan-Ryan 0-1.		T Lacey 0-9, P O'Dwyer 1-1, C Gleeson 0-1.

4 October 1998 Quarter-final	Kickhams	1-08 - 0-10	Loughmore-Castleiney	Leahy Park
	M O'Brien 0-4, J McCormack 1-0, B Horgan 0-2, P Morrissey 0-1, A Qualter 0-1.		P McGrath 0-5, N Cahill 0-3, D Laffan 0-1, S Bohan 0-1.

=== Semi-finals ===
18 October 1998 Semi-final	Toomevara	4-19 - 0-13	Kickhams	Semple Stadium
	Tommy Dunne 1-9, P O'Brien 2-0, K Kennedy 1-1, K Cummins 0-4, M Bevans 0-3, K Dunne 0-1, P King 0-1.		G Butler 0-3, B Horgan 0-3, A Qualter 0-2, M O'Brien 0-2, V Kelly 0-2, J McCormack 0-1.

18 October 1998 Semi-final	Clonoulty-Rossmore	3-11 - 1-16	Nenagh Éire Óg	Semple Stadium
	M Kennedy 0-6, D Ryan 1-2, D Quirke 1-1, M Quirke 1-1, K Ryan 0-1.		J Kennedy 0-9, D O'Meara 1-0, K Tucker 0-3, E Tucker 0-2, J Slattery 0-1, C Howard 0-1.	Referee: W Clohessy

=== Final ===
1 November 1998 Final	Toomevara	0-16 - 1-10	Clonoulty-Rossmore	Semple Stadium
	Tommy Dunne 0-5, T Delaney 0-3, M Bevans 0-2, K Cummins 0-2, K Kennedy 0-2, D Kelly 0-1, P O'Brien 0-1.		M Kennedy 0-6, D Ryan 1-2, A Butler 0-1, K Lanigan-Ryan 0-1.	Referee: W Barrett (Ardfinnan)

== Championship statistics ==
=== Top scorers ===
Top scorers overall

Rank	Player	Club	Tally	Total	Matches	Average
1	John Kennedy	Nenagh Éire Óg	1-19	22	2	11.00
2	Tommy Dunne	Toomevara	1-18	21	3	7.00
3	Michael Kennedy	Clonoulty-Rossmore	0-17	17	3	5.66
4	Kevin Kennedy	Toomevara	3-05	14	3	4.66
5	Declan Ryan	Clonoulty-Rossmore	2-06	12	3	4.00
6	Kevin Cummins	Toomevara	1-07	10	3	3.33
7	Paddy O'Brien	Toomevara	2-03	9	3	3.00
7	Tony Lacey	Boherlahan-Dualla	0-09	9	1	9.00
9	Maurice Quirke	Clonoulty-Rossmore	2-02	8	3	2.66
9	Liam Cahill	Ballingarry	1-05	8	1	8.00

Top scorers in a single game

Rank	Player	Club	Tally	Total	Opposition
1	John Kennedy	Nenagh Éire Óg	1-10	13	Carrick Swans
2	Tommy Dunne	Toomevara	1-09	12	Kickhams
3	John Kennedy	Nenagh Éire Óg	0-09	9	Clonoulty-Rossmore
3	Tony Lacey	Boherlahan-Dualla	0-09	9	Clonoulty-Rossmore
5	Kevin Kennedy	Toomevara	2-02	8	Ballingarry
5	Liam Cahill	Ballingarry	1-05	8	Toomevara
7	Paddy O'Brien	Toomevara	2-00	6	Kickhams
7	Michael Kennedy	Clonoulty-Rossmore	2-00	6	Nenagh Éire Óg
7	Michael Kennedy	Clonoulty-Rossmore	2-00	6	Toomevara
10	Brian O'Meara	Nenagh Éire Óg	1-02	5	Carrick Swans
10	Declan Ryan	Clonoulty-Rossmore	1-02	5	Nenagh Éire Óg
10	Declan Ryan	Clonoulty-Rossmore	1-02	5	Toomevara
10	Michael Kennedy	Clonoulty-Rossmore	0-05	5	Boherlahan-Dualla
10	Pat McGrath	Loughmore-Castleiney	0-05	5	Kickhams
10	Tommy Dunne	Toomevara	0-05	5	Clonoulty-Rossmore
