= Paul Shelley (hurler) =

Irish hurler

Personal information
- Native name: Pól Ó Sealbhaigh (Irish)
- Born: 26 July 1970 (age 56) Killenaule, County Tipperary, Ireland
- Height: 5 ft 9 in (175 cm)

Sport
- Sport: Hurling
- Position: Right corner-back
Club
- Years: Club
- Killenaule
Club titles
- Tipperary titles: 0
Inter-county
- Years: County
- 1996-2000; 2003: Tipperary
Inter-county titles
- Munster titles: 0
- All-Irelands: 0
- NHL: 1
- All Stars: 1

Paul Shelley (born 25 April 1976) is an Irish former hurler. At club level he played with Killenaule and at inter-county level with the Tipperary senior hurling team.

== Career ==
Shelley first played hurling at juvenile and underage levels with the Killeanaule club. He progressed to adult level and won a South Tipperary SHC as a substitute in 2005, after a 0–14 to 0–13 win over Ballingarry in the final.

At inter-county level, Shelley first played for Tipperary during a three-year tenure with the minor team. He was part of the team that won the Munster MHC title in 1993. Shelley subsequently progressed to the under-21 team and was at full-back when Tipperary beat Kilkenny by 1-14 to 1-10 in the 1995 All-Ireland U21 HC final. He captained the team in his third and final season in the grade in 1997.

Shelly was still part of the under-21 team when he joined Tipperary's senior team in 1996. He won an All-Star award in 1997 for his role in Tipperary's run to the All-Ireland SHC final, which effectively ended with a defeat by Clare. He won a National Hurling League medal in 1999. Shelley left the Tipperary panel and moved to the United States in February 2001. After being beset with back and leg pains brought on by sciatica the following year, Shelley made a brief return to the Tipperary panel in January 2003.

== Honours ==
Killenaule

- South Tipperary Senior Hurling Championship (1): 2005

Tipperary

- National Hurling League (1): 1999
- All-Ireland Under-21 Hurling Championship (1): 1995
- Munster Under-21 Hurling Championship (1): 1995
- Munster Minor Hurling Championship (1): 1993

Awards

- All-Star Awards (1): 1997

Sporting positions
Preceded by Terry Dunne	Tipperary under-21 hurling team captain 1997	Succeeded by Philip Rabbitte
