= Conor Gleeson (Tipperary hurler) =

Irish hurler

Personal information
- Native name: Conchur Ó Gliasáin (Irish)
- Born: 4 May 1973 (age 53) Boherlahan, County Tipperary, Ireland
- Occupation: Garda detective
- Height: 6 ft 4 in (193 cm)

Sport
- Sport: Hurling
- Position: Centre-back
Club
- Years: Club
- Boherlahan–Dualla
Club titles
- Tipperary titles: 1
College(s)
- Years: College
- Carow RTC; Garda College
College titles
- Fitzgibbon titles: 0
Inter-county
- Years: County
- 1995-2005: Tipperary
Inter-county titles
- Munster titles: 1
- All-Irelands: 1
- NHL: 2
- All Stars: 0

Conor Gleeson (born 4 May 1973) is an Irish hurling coach and former player. At club level he played with Boherlahan–Dualla and at inter-county level with the Tipperary senior hurling team.

== Playing career ==
Gleeson played hurling and Gaelic football at all levels during his time as a student a Cashel CBS. He won a McGowan Cup medal as part of the school's Gaelic football team. Gleeson later studied at Carlow Regional Technical College and won a Ryan Cup medal in 1993. He later trained at the Garda College and was a Fitzgibbon Cup runner-up in 1997.

At club level, Gleeson first played hurling at juvenile and underage levels with Boherlahan–Dualla. He won a Tipperary MBHC medal in 1991, before progressing to adult level. Gleeson was part of the Boherlahan–Dualla team that won the Tipperary SHC title in 1996, after a 1–16 to 2–12 win over Toomevara in the final.

Gleeson first appeared on the inter-county scene for Tipperary as a dual player at under-21 level. He made his senior team debut in 1995. Gleeson captained Tipperary on their run to the 1997 All-Ireland SHC final, which ultimately ended with a defeat by Clare. Gleeson won a National Hurling League title in 1999, before claiming a second winners' medal in that competition in 2001. He later added a Munster SHC medal to his collection, but missed the final through injury, before Tipperary made a clean sweep of all the major hurling titles by beating Galway in the 2001 All-Ireland SHC final.

Gleeson's performances for Tipperary also resulted in a call-up to the Munster inter-provincial team. He retired from inter-county hurling as a result of an ongoing back problem in 2005.

== Coaching career ==
In retirement from playing, Gleeson has become involved in team management as both a coach and manager at club and inter-county levels. He worked as a coach during Éamonn Kelly's tenures as manager of Kerry, Offaly and Laois, during which time the former won the Christy Ring Cup title. Gleeson has also worked as manager of a number of club sides, including Boherlahan–Dualla and Golden–Kilfeacle. He managed Rathdowney–Errill to the Laois SHC title in 2014.

== Honours ==
=== Player ===
Carlow Regional Technical College

- Ryan Cup (1): 1993

Boherlahan–Dualla

- Tipperary Senior Hurling Championship (1): 1996
- Tipperary Junior A Football Championship (1): 1996

Tipperary

- All-Ireland Senior Hurling Championship (1): 2001
- Munster Senior Hurling Championship (1): 2001
- National Hurling League (2): 1999, 2001

=== Management ===
Rathdowney–Errill

- Laois Senior Hurling Championship (1): 2014

Kerry

- Christy Ring Cup (1): 2015
- National Hurling League Division 2A (1): 2015

Sporting positions
Preceded by Michael Cleary	Tipperary senior hurling team captain 1997	Succeeded by Declan Ryan
