= William Hickey (hurler) =

Irish hurler (born 1978)

Personal information
- Native name: Liam Ó hIcí (Irish)
- Born: 23 September 1978 (age 48) Boherlahan, County Tipperary, Ireland
- Height: 5 ft 7 in (170 cm)

Sport
- Sport: Hurling
- Position: Left corner-back
Club
- Years: Club
- Boherlahan–Dualla
Club titles
- Tipperary titles: 1
Inter-county
- Years: County
- 1998: Tipperary
Inter-county titles
- Munster titles: 0
- All-Irelands: 0
- NHL: 0
- All Stars: 0

William Hickey (born 23 September 1978) is an Irish former hurler. At club level, he played with Boherlahan–Dualla and at inter-county level with the Tipperary senior hurling team.

== Playing career ==
At club level, Hickey first played with Boherlahan–Dualla at juvenile and underage levels, before progressing to adult level. He won a Tipperary SHC medal in 1996, following a 1–16 to 2–12 defeat of Toomevara in the final.

Hickey first appeared on the inter-county scene with Tipperary at minor level. He won a Munster MHC medal, as well as being left corner-back on the team that won the All-Ireland MHC title in 1996. His subsequent three seasons with the under-21 team ended with a Munster U21HC medal as team captain in 1999. Hickey was also a member of the senior team in 1998.

== Honours ==
Boherlahan–Dualla GAA

- Tipperary Senior Hurling Championship (1): 1996

Tipperary

- Munster Under-21 Hurling Championship (1): 1999 (c)
- All-Ireland Minor Hurling Championship (1): 1996
- Munster Minor Hurling Championship (1): 1996

Sporting positions
Preceded by Philip Rabbitte	Tipperary under-21 hurling team captain 1999	Succeeded by Shane McDermott
