= Philip Dwyer (disambiguation) =

Philip Dwyer or Phil Dwyer may refer to:

- Philip Dwyer (born 1967 or 1968), Irish far-right anti-immigration activist
- Philip J. Dwyer (1844–1917), American racehorse owner, and businessman (meat packing)
- Phil Dwyer (musician) (born 1965), Canadian jazz musician
- Phil Dwyer (1953–2021), Welsh footballer

== See also ==
- Philip O'Dwyer (born 1976), Irish hurler
