= Séamus Kavanagh =

Irish hurler

Personal information
- Native name: Séamus Caomhánach (Irish)
- Born: 1973 (age 52–53) Kilmuckridge, County Wexford, Ireland

Sport
- Sport: Hurling
- Position: Goalkeeper
Club
- Years: Club
- Buffers Alley
Club titles
- Wexford titles: 2
- Leinster titles: 1
Inter-county
- Years: County
- 1995-1998: Wexford
Inter-county titles
- Leinster titles: 2
- All-Irelands: 1
- NHL: 0
- All Stars: 0

Séamus Kavanagh (born 1973) is an Irish former hurler. At club level, he played with Buffers Alley and at inter-county level was a member of the Wexford senior hurling team.

== Career ==
At club level, Murphy first played for the Buffers Alley club in the juvenile and underage grades. He was still eligible for the minor grade when he won his first Wexford SHC title in 1991, before claiming a second winners' medal in 1992 when the club retained the title. Kavanagh won a Leinster Club SHC medal in 1992 following a 2–13 to 0–13 defeat of St Rynagh's in the final.

Kavanagh first appeared on the inter-county scene with Wexford as goalkeeper on the minor team in 1991. He made his senior team debut in National Hurling League and Oireachtas Tournament games in October 1995. Kavanagh was sub-goalkeeper to his clubmate Damien Fitzhenry and won consecutive Leinster SHC medals, as well as an All-Ireland SHC medal following Wexford's defeat of Limerick in 1996.

== Honours ==
Buffers Alley

- Leinster Senior Club Hurling Championship: 1992
- Wexford Senior Hurling Championship: 1991, 1992

Wexford

- All-Ireland Senior Hurling Championship: 1996
- Leinster Senior Hurling Championship: 1996, 1997
