= Paul Kelly (hurler) =

Tipperary hurler

Personal information
- Native name: Pól Ó Ceallaigh (Irish)
- Born: 14 December 1979 (age 46) Mullinahone, County Tipperary
- Height: 5 ft 11 in (180 cm)

Sport
- Sport: Hurling
- Position: Midfield
Clubs
- Years: Club
- 1990s–2007 2008–2009: Mullinahone; O'Loughlin Gaels
Club titles
- Tipperary titles: 1
Inter-county*
Years	County	Apps (scores)
1998–2011	Tipperary	36 (1–48)
Inter-county titles
- Munster titles: 2
- All-Irelands: 1
- NHL: 2
- All Stars: 2
- *Inter County team apps and scores correct as of March 2006.

Paul Kelly (born 14 December 1979) is an Irish hurler who plays for his local club Mullinahone and at senior level for the Tipperary county team. Recently he has transferred clubs to O'Loughlin Gaels club in Kilkenny but since 2010 he has returned to play for Mullinahone. He is noted for his versatility, playing in the backline, midfield and more recently in the forward line.

== Early life ==
Paul Kelly was born in Mullinahone on the Tipperary-Kilkenny border in 1979. He is the older brother of Eoin Kelly. He was educated locally and attended Scoil Riain Killenaule Vocational School which has produced many Tipperary Hurlers.

== Playing career ==
=== Club ===
Kelly played his club hurling with his native Mullinahone with whom he has won one County Senior Hurling medal in 2002. On 17 March 2008, it was announced that Kelly would join O'Loughlin Gaels (a Kilkenny club) for the upcoming club season. He later returned to Mullinahone. He won a Tipperary Intermediate Football Championship with them in 2011.

=== Inter-county ===
Kelly was quickly selected for inter-county duty with Tipperary. He joined the Tipp minors at a relatively young age and went on to win an All-Ireland minor medal in 1996 and a Munster minor medal in 1997. He won a Munster Under-21 medal in 1999. Having joined the Tipperary senior hurling panel in 1998 he was a key member of the panel when the team won the National League, the Munster Championship and the All-Ireland Championship in 2001. Kelly also won a Railway Cup medal with Munster in 2001. Although not having much success with Tipperary in 2002 he received his first All-Star award. Although losing out to Cork in the Munster Final in 2005, Kelly scored 7 points from his midfield position and was named RTÉ's 'man of the match.' He claimed a further All-Star award in 2005, together with his brother Eoin.

Kelly has also won 2 Under-21 caps for Ireland in the Shinty Internationals against Scotland. In April 2010, Kelly broke his ankle in a club match, jeopardising his participation in the 2010 All Ireland Senior Hurling Championship.

== Coaching career ==
Kelly has been a hurling coach, managed the Mullinahone ladies' footballers and was appointed as Dublin camogie manager on a three-year term in October 2022.

He took over the Carlow intermediate camogie team in December 2025.

== Honours ==
=== Team ===
Mullinahone

- Tipperary Senior Hurling Championship (1): 2002

Tipperary

- All-Ireland Senior Hurling Championship (1): 2001
- Munster Senior Hurling Championship (2): 2001, 2009
- National Hurling League (2): 2001, 2008
- All-Ireland Minor Hurling Championship (1): 1996
- Munster Minor Hurling Championship (1): 1996

=== Individual ===
Awards

- All-Star Awards (2): 2002, 2005
