= Roy Mannion =

Irish hurler

Personal information
- Native name: Ruadh Ó Mainnín (Irish)
- Nickname: White Death
- Born: 1968 (age 57–58) Birr, County Offaly, Ireland
- Height: 6 ft 9 in (206 cm)

Sport
- Sport: Hurling
- Position: Right wing-back
Club
- Years: Club
- St Rynagh's
Club titles
- Offaly titles: 4
- Leinster titles: 1
Inter-county*
| Years | County | Apps (scores) |
| 1988-1997 | Offaly | 9 (0-00) |
Inter-county titles
- Leinster titles: 2
- All-Irelands: 0
- NHL: 1
- All Stars: 5
- *Inter County team apps and scores correct as of 13:19, 30 June 2014.

Roy Mannion (born 1968) is an Irish former hurler who played as a right wing-back for the Offaly senior team.

Born in Banagher, County Offaly, Mannion first played competitive hurling in his youth. He first came to prominence on the inter-county scene when he first linked up with the Offaly minor team, before later joining the under-21 side. He made his senior debut during the 1988-89 National League and immediately became a regular member of the team. During his career, Mannion won two Leinster medals and one National Hurling League medal.

At club level, Mannion is a one-time Leinster medallist with St Rynagh's. In addition to this, he also won four championship medals.

His retirement came during the 1997 championship.

In retirement from playing, Mannion became involved in team management and coaching. He served as a selector with the Offaly minor team for two seasons.

== Honours ==
=== Team ===
St Rynagh's

- Leinster Senior Club Hurling Championship (1): 1993
- Offaly Senior Club Hurling Championship (4): 1987, 1990, 1992, 1993

Offaly

- Leinster Senior Hurling Championship (1): 1989, 1990
- National Hurling League (1): 1990-91
- Leinster Under-21 Hurling Championship (1): 1989
- All-Ireland Minor Hurling Championship (2): 1987, 1986
- Leinster Minor Hurling Championship (2): 1986
