= Michael Kennedy (Tipperary hurler) =

Irish hurler (born 1978)

Personal information
- Native name: Mícheál Ó Cinnéide (Irish)
- Nickname: Bonny
- Born: 15 May 1978 (age 48) Clonoulty, County Tipperary, Ireland
- Height: 5 ft 6 in (168 cm)

Sport
- Sport: Hurling
- Position: Left corner-forward
Club
- Years: Club
- Clonoulty–Rossmore
Club titles
- Tipperary titles: 1
Inter-county
Years	County	Apps (scores)
1998	Tipperary	1 (0-01)
Inter-county titles
- Munster titles: 0
- All-Irelands: 0
- NHL: 0
- All Stars: 0

Michael Kennedy (born 15 May 1978) is an Irish former hurler. At club level, he played with Clonoulty–Rossmore and at inter-county level with the Tipperary senior hurling team.)

== Playing career ==
At club level, Kennedy first played with Boherlahan–Dualla at juvenile and underage levels. He won a Tipperary MAHC title in 1996, the same year he progressed to the club's adult section. Kennedy won a Tipperary SHC medal in 1997, following a 0–17 to 1–12 defeat of Mullnahone in the final.

Kennedy first appeared on the inter-county scene with Tipperary during a two-year stint at minor level. He won a Munster MHC medal, as well as being left corner-forward on the team that won the All-Ireland MHC title in 1996. His subsequent three seasons with the under-21 team ended with a Munster U21HC medal in 1999. Kennedy was also a member of the senior team in 1998, while he later played with the New York team.

== Honours ==
Clonoulty–Rossmore

- Tipperary Senior Hurling Championship (1): 1997
- Tipperary Minor A Hurling Championship (1): 1996

Tipperary

- Munster Under-21 Hurling Championship (1): 1999
- All-Ireland Minor Hurling Championship (1): 1996
- Munster Minor Hurling Championship (1): 1996
