= Philip O'Dwyer =

Irish hurler

Personal information
- Native name: Pilib Ó Dubhuir (Irish)
- Born: 1976 (age 49–50) Boherlahan, County Tipperary, Ireland

Sport
- Sport: Hurling
- Position: Left corner-forward
Club
- Years: Club
- Boherlahan–Dualla
Club titles
- Tipperary titles: 1
College
- Years: College
- University College Cork
College titles
- Fitzgibbon titles: 1
Inter-county
Years	County	Apps (scores)
1997	Tipperary	2 (0-01)
Inter-county titles
- Munster titles: 0
- All-Irelands: 0
- NHL: 0
- All Stars: 0

Philip O'Dwyer (born 1976) is an Irish former hurler. At club level, he played with Boherlahan–Dualla and also lined out at inter-county level with various Tipperary teams.

== Career ==
O'Dwyer first played hurling at juvenile and underage levels with the Boherlahan–Dualla club, winning Tipperary MBHC and MAHC medals in 1991 and 1993 respectively. He later studied at University College Cork and was part of the college's Fitzgibbon Cup-winning team in 1996. O'Dwyer also won a Tipperary SHC medal that season, after lining out in the 1–16 to 2–12 defeat of Toomevara in the final.

At inter-county level, O'Dwyer first played for Tipperary as part of the minor team that won the Munster MHC title in 1993. He later progressed to the under-21 team and came on as a substitute in the four-point win over Kilkenny in the 1995 All-Ireland U21HC final. O'Dwyer was part of the senior team during the 1997 season, however, he was dropped from the panel in advance of that year's All-Ireland final.

== Honours ==
University College Cork

- Fitzgibbon Cup: 1996

Boherlahan–Dualla

- Tipperary Senior Hurling Championship: 1996
- Tipperary Minor A Hurling Championship: 1993
- Tipperary Minor B Hurling Championship: 1991

Tipperary

- All-Ireland Under-21 Hurling Championship: 1995
- Munster Under-21 Hurling Championship: 1995
- Munster Minor Hurling Championship: 1991
