= 1941 Tipperary Senior Hurling Championship =

Annual hurling competition season

- Dates: 19 October – 30 November 1941
- Teams: 4
- Champions: Boherlahan (10th title); Phil Dwyer (captain)
- Runners-up: Éire Óg Annacarty

Tournament statistics
- Matches played: 3
- Goals scored: 17 (5.67 per match)
- Points scored: 22 (7.33 per match)

The 1941 Tipperary Senior Hurling Championship was the 50th staging of the Tipperary Senior Hurling Championship since its establishment by the Tipperary County Board in 1887. The championship ran from 19 October to 30 November 1941

Moycarkey–Borris were the defending champions.

The final was played on 30 November 1941 at Cashel Sportsfield, between Boherlahan and first-time finalists Éire Óg Annacarty. Boherlahan won the match by 2–02 to 0–06 to claim their 10th championship title overall and a first title in 13 years.

== Qualification ==
Championship	Champions
Mid Tipperary Senior Hurling Championship	Boherlahan
North Tipperary Senior Hurling Championship	Roscrea
South Tipperary Senior Hurling Championship	Killenaule
West Tipperary Senior Hurling Championship	Éire Óg Annacarty

== Results ==
=== Semi-finals ===
19 October 1941 Semi-final	Boherlahan	6-04 - 3-07	Roscrea	Thurles Sportsfield

16 November 1941 Semi-final	Éire Óg Annacarty	6-01 - 0-02	Killenaule	Cashel Sportsfield

=== Final ===
30 November 1941 Final	Boherlahan	2-02 - 0-06	Éire Óg Annacarty	Thurles Sportsfield
