= 1992–93 All-Ireland Senior Club Hurling Championship =

All-Ireland Senior Club Hurling Championship 1992–93
Championship Details
- Dates: 27 September 1992 – 17 March 1993
- Teams: 28

All Ireland Champions
- Winners: Sarsfields (1st win)
- Captain: Pakie Cooney
- Manager: Michael Conneely

All Ireland Runners-up
- Runners-up: Kilmallock
- Captain: Paddy Kelly
- Manager: Tony Moloney

Provincial Champions
- Munster: Kilmallock
- Leinster: Buffer's Alley
- Ulster: Ruairí Óg
- Connacht: Sarsfields

Championship Statistics
- Matches Played: 30
- Total Goals: 89 (2.96 per game)
- Total Points: 595 (19.83 er game)
- Top Scorer: Paddy Kelly (6–23)

The 1992–93 All-Ireland Senior Club Hurling Championship was the 23rd staging of the All-Ireland Senior Club Hurling Championship, the Gaelic Athletic Association's premier inter-county club hurling tournament. The championship ran from 27 September 1992 to 17 March 1993.

Kiltormer were the defending champions, however, they failed to qualify after being beaten in the 1992 Galway SHC. Erin's Own of Cork, Ballyheigue of Kerry and Wolfe Tones of Longford made their championship debuts.

The All-Ireland final was played at Croke Park in Dublin on 17 March 1993, between Sarsfields of Galway and Kilmallock of Limerick, in what was a first championship meeting between the teams. Sarsfields won the match by 1–17 to 2–07 to claim a first title.

Kilmallock's Paddy Kelly was the championship's top scorer with 6–23.

== Connacht Senior Club Hurling Championship ==
=== Connacht first round ===
4 October 1992 First round	Craobh Rua	2–07 – 1–08	St Mary's Kiltoghert	Markievicz Park
	P Galvin 1–1, A Kinsella 0–4, P Burke 1–0, H Cox 0–2.		A O'Shea 1–2, B Beirne 0–3, M Cunniffe 0–1, M Daly 0–1, S Heslin 0–1.

=== Connacht quarter-final ===
11 October 1992 Quarter-final	Craobh Rua	2–06 – 0–14	Tooreen	Kent Park
	E Bellew 2–4, P Galvin 0–2.		J Henry 0–8, J Cunnane 0–3, F Delaney 0–1, M Trench 0–1, Dom Greally 0–1.

=== Connacht semi-final ===
15 November 1992 Semi-final	Oran	1–14 – 1–06	Tooreen	Athleague Sportsfield
	C Kelly 0-6, W Depinna 0-5, M Lennon 1-1, S Fallon 0-1, P Mullarkey 0-1.		Dom Greally 1–0, J Henry 0–2, J Cunnane 0–2, V Henry 0–1, G Greally 0–1.

=== Connacht final ===
29 November 1992 Final	Oran	0–07 – 2–15	Sarsfields	Athleague Sportsfield
	C Kelly 0–2, W Depinna 0–2, P Kelly 0–1, A Kelly 0–1, M Lennon 0–1.		Peter Kelly 2–0, J Cooney 0–5, A Donoghue 0–4, J McGrath 0–3, M McGrath 0–2, Peter Cooney 0–1.

== Leinster Senior Club Hurling Championship ==
=== Leinster first round ===
10 October 1992 First round	Naomh Eoin	9–16 – 0–06	Wolfe Tones	Ashfield Park
	M Slye 2–3, D Treacy 2–1, D Murphy 2–0, P Quirke 1–2, N Minchin 1–1, J Byrne 0–3, S Foley 0–2, B Murphy 0–2, J O'Neill 0–2.		S McNally 1–0 (og), J Lynn 0–6.	Referee: M Sheridan (Kildare)

11 October 1992 First round	St Patrick's	2–09 – 1–05	Naomh Moninne	Pearse Park
	D Bury 0–5, A Delaney 1–1, E King 1–1, J Verney 0–2.		J Murphy 0–4, J McGuinness 1–0, P Mulholland 0–1.

11 October 1992 First round	Trim	3–06 – 1–07	Castledermot	St Loman's Park
	M Murray 2–0, E mcCaffrey 0–6, CJ Murtagh 1–0.		G Deering 0–6, D Carton 1–0, E Kelly 0–1.

17 October 1992 First round	Raharney	0–11 – 0–11	Clonad	Páirc Mhic Eochagáin
	T Raleigh 0–3, M Doyle 0–3, N Croash 0–2, M Farrelly 0–1, J Coyne 0–1, S Greville 0–1.		E Fennell 0–4, N Roe 0–3, M Doran 0–1, G Norton 0–1, A Dunne 0–1, D Dunne 0–1.

24 October 1992 First round replay	Clonad	2–11 – 1–08	Raharney	O'Moore Park
	G Norton 1–3, E Fennell 0–4, J Fennell 1–0, N Roe 0–2, A Dunne 0–1, M Drennan 0–1.		M Doyle 0–5, S Greville 1–0, N Croash 0–1, M Farrelly 0–1, T Raleigh 0–1.

=== Leinster quarter-finals ===
31 October 1992 Quarter-final	Clonad	1–09 – 3–10	Buffer's Alley	O'Moore Park
	M Doran 1–0, N Roe 0–3, E Fennell 0–2, G Conroy 0–2, G Norton 0–1, A Dunne 0–1.		S O'Leary 2–1, T Dempsey 0–7, S Whelan 1–0, M Gahan 0–1, J Foley 0–1.

31 October 1992 Quarter-final	St Patrick's	0–06 – 2–20	Glenmore	Dunbur Road
	D Bury 0–2, C O'Brien 0–2, C Byrne 0–2.		R Heffernan 0–8, P Barron 0–5, M Phelan 1–1, F Kirwan 1–0, J Heffernan 0–2, D Mullally 0–2, M "Foxy" Phelan 0–1, PJ O'Connor 0–1.

1 November 1992 Quarter-final	Trim	4–06 – 1–12	Faughs	St Loman's Park
	T Massey 2–2, K Murray 1–0, E McCaffrey 1–0, D O'Keeffe 0–2, A Smith 0–1, I McCaffrey 0–1.		A O'Grady 0–6, W Hughes 1–0, J Close 0–3, J Queally 0–2, T McGrath 0–1.

7 November 1992 Quarter-final	Naomh Eoin	1–11 – 3–13	St Rynagh's	Dr Cullen Park
	M Slye 0–5, J Byrne 1–1, P Quirke 0–3, N Minchin 0–1, D Murphy 0–1.		M Conneely 0–8, F Dolan 2–1, M Duignan 1–1, T Moylan 0–2, E Mulhare 0–1.

=== Leinster semi-finals ===
14 November 1992 Semi-final	Glenmore	1–04 – 1–13	St Rynagh's	Dr Cullen Park
	C Heffernan 1–0, R Heffernan 0–3, M Phelan 0–1.		M Conneely 0–6, F Dolan 1–2, D Devery 0–2, T Moylan 0–2, J Nallen 0–1.	Referee: P Delaney (Laois)

15 November 1992 Semi-final	Trim	0–09 – 2–19	Buffer's Alley	Geraldine Park
	E McCaffrey 0–3, T Massey 0–2, D O'Keeffe 0–2, A Smith 0–1, K Murray 0–1.		T Dempsey 0–9, P Donoghue 0–6, E Sinnott 1–1, J Gahan 1–0, S Whelan 0–1, S O'Leary 0–1, C Whelan 0–1.	Referee: S O'Meara (Offaly)

=== Leinster final ===
29 November 1992 Final	Buffer's Alley	2–13 – 0–13	St Rynagh's	Croke Park
	T Dempsey 0–8, J Gahan 2–0, P Donohue 0–2, P Gahan 0–1, F O'Leary 0–1, E Sinnott 0–1.		M Coneeley 0–5, M Duignan 0–2, T Moylan 0–2, F Dolan 0–1, R Mannion 0–1, M Kenny 0–1, D Devery 0–1.

== Munster Senior Club Hurling Championship ==
=== Munster quarter-finals ===
11 October 1992 Quarter-final	Ballyheigue	1–07 – 1–15	Sixmilebridge	J. J. O'Sullivan Park
	D O'Sullivan 1–0, L O'Mahony 0–2, K O'Sullivan 0–2, N Roche 0–1, G Lucid 0–1, B O'Sullivan 0–1.		P McNamara 0–5, E Healy 1–1, D Chaplin 0–3, J Chaplin 0–1, P Morey 0–1, D McInerney 0–1, J McInerney 0–1, F Quilligan 0–1, O Quane 0–1.

1 November 1992 Quarter-final	Erin's Own	1–11 – 1–11	Kilmallock	Caherlag Sportsfield
	P Corcoran 0–5, PJ Murphy 1–0, J Corcoran 0–3, T Kelleher 0–1, J Dillon 0–1, F Horgan 0–1.		T Nelligan 1–2, M Nelligan 0–2, M Houlihan 0–2, P Kelly 0–2, P Tobin 0–1, P Dowling 0–1, D Hanley 0–1.	Referee: W Barrett (Tipperary)

8 November 1992 Quarter-final replay	Kilmallock	3–10 – 0–11	Erin's Own	FitzGerald Park
	P Kelly 1–5, B Hanley 1–1, P Dowling 1–0, P Barrett 0–2, P Tobin 0–1, M Nelligan 0–1.		J Corcoran 0–7, T Kelleher 0–1, G Greasley 0–1, C O'Connell 0–1, M Nicholl 0–1.	Referee: W Barrett (Tipperary)

=== Munster semi-finals ===
15 November 1992 Semi-final	Sixmilebridge	3–12 – 0–05	Ballygunner	O'Garney Park
	E Healey 1–2, O Quane 1–1, D Chaplin 1–1, P McNamara 0–3, G McInerney 0–2, J O'Connell 0–1, N Earley 0–1, F Qulligan 0–1.		P Flynn 0–2, B O'Sullivan 0–1, P Power 0–1, L Whitty 0–1.	Referee: P O'Connor (Limerick)

15 November 1992 Semi-final	Kilmallock	2–07 – 0–11	Toomevara	FitzGerald Park
	P Kelly 1–5, P Tobin 1–0, M Nelligan 0–1, P Barrett 0–1.		Tommy Dunne 0–3, L Nolan 0-2, M Nolan 0-2, P King 0–1, M Murphy 0–1, Terry Dunne 0-1, M O'Meara0–1.

=== Munster final ===
29 November 1992 Final	Kilmallock	3–11 – 2–11	Sixmilebridge	Gaelic Grounds
	P Kelly 2–5, B Hanley 1–1, P Tobin 0–2, D Clarke 0–2, D Hanley 0–1.		O Quane 1–3, G McInerney 1–3, J O'Connell 0–2, C Chaplin 0–1, N Earley 0–1, P McNamara 0–1.	Referee: W Barrett (Tipperary)

== Ulster Senior Club Hurling Championship ==
=== Ulster semi-finals ===
27 September 1992 Semi-final	Keady Lámh Dhearg	0–11 – 3–14	Ruairí Óg, Cushendall	McGleenan Park
	S Hughes 0–8, M Houlihan 0–1, J McCormack 0–1, P Cunningham 0–1.		Danny McNaughten 0–6, S McKeegan 1–1, C McCambridge 1–1, Donagh McNaughten 1–0, J Carson 0–3, P Walsh 0–1, A McGuile 0–1, M McCambridge 0–1.

27 September 1992 Semi-final	Ballygalget	3–09 – 3–08	Lavey	Casement Park
	M Bailie 1–2, B Coulter 1–1, B Gallagher 1–1, P Savage 0–4, P Coulter 0–1.		P Collins 2–3, P McCloy 1–0, M Collins 0–2, S Downey 0–1, J Dillon 0–1, H Downey 0–1.

=== Ulster final ===
11 October 1992 Final	Ruairí Óg, Cushendall	2–12 – 1–10	Ballygalget	Casement Park
	J Carson 1–4, P Walsh 0–5, A McGuile 1–1, D McNaughton 0–1, T McNaughton 0–1.		B Gallagher 0–5, M Bailie 1–1, P Savage 0–2, B Coulter 0–1, B Smyth 0–1.

== All-Ireland Senior Club Hurling Championship ==
=== All-Ireland quarter-final ===
6 December 1992 Quarter-final	Desmonds	2–07 – 1–08	Ruairí Óg, Cushendall	Emerald GAA Grounds
	P Lynch 1–1, M Killeen 1–0, M BUrke 0–3, M Barrett 0–3.		J Carson 0–4, D McNaughton 1–0, A McGuile 0–3.	Referee: T Lyons (Limerick)

=== All-Ireland semi-finals ===
28 February 1993 Semi-final	Kilmallock	1–16 – 0–06	Desmonds	FitzGerald Park
	P Kelly 1–5, P Barrett 0–3, M Nelligan 0–2, M Houlihan 0–2, P Tobin 0–2, D Hanley 0–2.		K Leahy 0–3, M Killeen 0–1, N Moloney 0–1, D Power 0–1.	Referee: S O'Meara (Offaly)

28 February 1993 Semi-final	Buffer's Alley	1–10 – 4–13	Sarsfields	Wexford Park
	S O'Leary 1–1, T Dempsey 0–4, P Gahan 0–2, J Gahan 0–1, S Whelan 0–1, M Foley 0–1.		Peter Cooney 2–0, A Donoghue 0–5, M Kenny 1–1, H Butler 1-0 (og), J McGrath 0–2, J Cooney 0–2, N Morrissey 0–1, M McGrath 0–1, Peter Kelly 0–1.	Referee: J McDonnell (Tipperary)

=== All-Ireland final ===
17 March 1993 Final	Sarsfields	1–17 – 2–07	Kilmallock	Croke Park
	Peter Kelly 1–2, A Donohue 0–5, M McGrath 0–4, Peter Cooney 0–3, Pádraic Kelly 0–2, J Cooney 0–1.		P Kelly 1–1, P Barrett 1–0, M Houlihan 0–3, D Clarke 0–2, P Tobin 0–1.

== Championship statistics ==
=== Top scorers ===
Rank	Player	Club	Tally	Total	Matches	Average
1	Paddy Kelly	Kilmallock	6–23	41	6	6.83
2	Tom Dempsey	Buffer's Alley	0–28	28	4	7.00
3	Micheál Conneely	St Rynagh's	0–19	19	3	6.33
4	Mick Slye	Naomh Eoin	2–08	14	2	7.00
4	Jackie Carson	Ruairí Óg	1–11	14	3	4.66
4	Aidan Donohue	Kiltormer	0–14	14	3	4.66
7	Fintan Dolan	St Rynagh's	3–04	13	3	4.33
8	Peter Kelly	Kiltormer	3–03	12	3	4.00
8	Seán O'Leary	Buffer's Alley	3–03	12	4	3.00
8	Eunan McCaffrey	Trim	1–09	12	3	4.00
