= John Heffernan (hurler) =

Irish hurler

Personal information
- Native name: Seán Ó hIfearnáin (Irish)
- Born: 27 December 1963 (age 62) Nenagh, County Tipperary, Ireland
- Occupation: Shop owner
- Height: 5 ft 11 in (180 cm)

Sport
- Sport: Hurling
- Position: Left corner-back
Club
- Years: Club
- Nenagh Éire Óg
Club titles
- Tipperary titles: 1
Inter-county*
Years	County	Apps (scores)
1986-1990	Tipperary	12 (0-00)
Inter-county titles
- Munster titles: 3
- All-Irelands: 1
- NHL: 1
- All Stars: 0
- *Inter County team apps and scores correct as of 22:26, 27 March 2018.

John Heffernan (born 27 December 1963) is an Irish retired hurler. His league and championship career with the Tipperary senior team lasted four seasons from 1986 to 1990.

== Early life ==
Born and raised in Nenagh, County Tipperary, Heffernan played hurling during his schooldays at Nenagh CBS. He was part of the school's senior team that played in the Dr Harty Cup competition.

== Club career ==
Heffernan played his club hurling and Gaelic football with Nenagh Éire Óg. He had success as a Gaelic footballer in 1988 when he won a Tipperary IFC after a 2-04 to 0-09 win over Ballyporeen. Heffernan later won three North Tipperary SHC medals between 1992 and 1998. He scored 1-03 when Nenagh Éire Óg beat Boherlahan–Dualla by 2-25 to 2-08 to win their first ever Tipperary SHC title in 1995. Heffernan added a second Tipperary IFC medal to his collection in 1997 when Nenagh Éire Óg claimed the title after a 3-07 to 1-06 defeat of Carrick Swans in a final replay.

== Inter-county career ==
Heffernan first appeared on the inter-county scene with Tipperary when he joined the minor team in 1981. He was at wing-back when Tipperary endured a 3-13 to 3-11 defeat by Clare in the 1981 Munster MHC final. Heffernan's lone season with the under-21 team ended without success.

After a number of years away from the inter-county scene, Heffernan joined the senior team in 1987. He won his first Munster SHC medal that year after a 4-22 to 1-22 extra-time defeat of Cork in the final. Heffernan added a National Hurling League medal and a second consecutive Munster SHC medal to his collection the following year. He later lined out at corner-back in the 1-15 to 0-14 defeat by Galway in the 1988 All-Ireland final.

Heffernan claimed a third successive Munster SHC medal in 1989. He later won an All-Ireland SHC medal after again lining out at corner-back in the 4-24 to 3-09 defeat of Antrim in the 1989 All-Ireland final. Heffernan made his last appearance for Tipperary in June 1990.

== Inter-provincial career ==
Heffernan's performances at inter-county level resulted in his selection for Munster in the Railway Cup campaigns of 1988 and 1989. He ended his inter-provincial career without success after Connacht beat Munster after extra-time in the 1989 final.

== Honours ==
Nenagh Éire Óg

- Tipperary Senior Hurling Championship: 1995
- North Tipperary Senior Hurling Championship: 1992, 1993, 1998
- Tipperary Intermediate Football Championship: 1988, 1997

Tipperary

- All-Ireland Senior Hurling Championship: 1989
- Munster Senior Hurling Championship: 1987, 1988, 1989
- National Hurling League: 1987-88
