= Brian Horgan =

Irish hurler, manager, & coach (born 1976)

Personal information
- Native name: Brian Ó hOrgáin (Irish)
- Born: 1976 (age 49–50) Dundrum, County Tipperary, Ireland

Sport
- Sport: Hurling
- Position: Right wing-back
Club
- Years: Club
- Knockavilla–Donaskeigh Kickhams
Club titles
	Football	Hurling
Tipperary titles	0	0
Inter-county*
Years	County	Apps (scores)
1998-2003	Tipperary	4 (0-00)
Inter-county titles
- Munster titles: 0
- All-Irelands: 0
- NHL: 1
- All Stars: 0
- *Inter County team apps and scores correct as of 20:05, 9 January 2014.

Brian Horgan (born 1976) is an Irish hurler who played as a right wing-back for the Tipperary senior hurling team.

Born in Dundrum, County Tipperary, Horgan first arrived on the inter-county scene at the age of seventeen when he first linked up with the Tipperary minor teams as a dual player, before later joining the under-21 hurling team. He joined the senior team for the 1998 championship. Horgan went on to play a bit part for Tipperary over the next few years, and won one National Hurling League medal.

At club level Horgan won numerous divisional medals in both hurling and Gaelic football with Knockavilla–Donaskeigh Kickhams.

Throughout his career Horgan made just four championship appearances. His inter-county career came to an end following the conclusion of the 2003 championship.

In retirement from playing, Horgan became involved in team management and coaching. He was an All-Ireland-winning selector with the Tipperary minor team in 2012. Horgan was expected to be appointed as a selector to the Kerry senior hurling team in January 2014.

== Honours ==
=== Player ===
Knockavilla–Donaskeigh Kickhams

- West Tipperary Senior Hurling Championship (3): 1997, 1999, 2006 (c)
- West Tipperary Senior Football Championship (1): 1998
- Tipperary Intermediate Football Championship (1): 2002
- West Tipperary Intermediate Football Championship (3): 1993, 2002, 2004, 2005
- Tipperary Junior Football Championship (1): 2009
- Tipperary Under-21 Hurling Championship (1): 1994
- West Tipperary Under-21 Hurling Championship (2): 1994, 1995
- West Tipperary Minor Hurling Championship (2): 1993, 1994

Tipperary

- National Hurling League (1): 1999
- All-Ireland Under-21 Hurling Championship (1): 1995 (c)
- Munster Under-21 Hurling Championship (1): 1995 (c)
- Munster Minor Hurling Championship (1): 1993

=== Selector ===
Tipperary

- All-Ireland Minor Hurling Championship (1): 2012
- Munster Minor Hurling Championship (1): 2012

Sporting positions
Preceded by Robbie Tomlinson	Tipperary Under-21 Hurling Captain; 1995	Succeeded by Terry Dunne
Achievements
Preceded by Philly Larkin	All-Ireland Under-21 Hurling Final winning captain 1995	Succeeded by Peter Huban
