= Micheál Conneely =

Irish hurler

Personal information
- Native name: Micheál Mac Conghaola (Irish)
- Born: 1965 (age 60–61) Banagher, County Offaly, Ireland
- Occupation: Carpenter

Sport
- Sport: Hurling
- Position: Midfield
Club
- Years: Club
- St Rynagh's
Club titles
- Offaly titles: 4
- Leinster titles: 1
Inter-county
Years	County	Apps (scores)
1987-1994	Offaly	4 (0-06)
Inter-county titles
- Leinster titles: 1
- All-Irelands: 1
- NHL: 0
- All Stars: 0

Micheál Conneely (born 1965) is an Irish former hurler. At club level, he played with St Rynagh's and at inter-county level with the Offaly senior hurling team.

== Career ==
Conneely first played hurling at juvenile and underage levels with St Rynagh's. He won an Offaly MHC medal in 1982, before progressing to the club's senior team. Conneely won four offaly SHC medals between 1987 and 1993, before subsequently converting the final victory into a Leinster Club SHC medal, following a one-point win over Dicksboro.

At inter-county level, Conneely made his first appearance for Offaly during a two-year tenure with the minor team in 1982 and 1983. A subsequent three-year stint with the under-21 team also ended without silverware. Conneely made his senior team debut in 1987 and went on to make a number of league and championship appearances over the following few seasons. He was an unused substitute when Offaly beat Limerick in the 1994 All-Ireland final.

== Honours ==
St Rynagh's

- Leinster Senior Club Hurling Championship: 1993
- Offaly Senior Hurling Championship: 1987, 1990, 1992, 1993
- Offaly Minor Hurling Championship: 1982

Offaly

- All-Ireland Senior Hurling Championship: 1994
- Leinster Senior Hurling Championship: 1994
