= 1989 All-Ireland Junior Hurling Championship =

All Ireland Champions
- Winners: Tipperary (8th win)
- Captain: Kevin Laffan
- Manager: Willie Sweeney

All Ireland Runners-up
- Runners-up: Galway
- Captain: Jimmy Noone
- Manager: Kieran Muldoon

Provincial Champions
- Munster: Tipperary
- Leinster: Kilkenny
- Ulster: Donegal
- Connacht: Galway

The 1989 All-Ireland Junior Hurling Championship was the 68th staging of the All-Ireland Junior Championship since its establishment by the Gaelic Athletic Association in 1912.

Kilkenny entered the championship as the defending champions.

The All-Ireland final was played on 21 July 1989 at the Gaelic Grounds in Limerick, between Tipperary and Galway, in what was their first meeting in a final since 1926. Tipperary won the match by 0–12 to 0–08 to claim their eighth championship title overall and a first title since 1953.

== Results ==
=== All-Ireland Junior Hurling Championship ===
==== All-Ireland quarter-final ====
1 July 1989 Quarter-final	Galway	3-18 - 1-06	Hertfordshire	Kenny Park

==== All-Ireland semi-finals ====
8 July 1989 Semi-final	Galway	1-16 - 3-08	Kilkenny	Ballinasloe Sportsfield

9 July 1989 Semi-final	Donegal	0-01 - 3-15	Tipperary	Fr. Tierney Park

==== All-Ireland final ====
21 July 1989 Final	Tipperary	0-12 - 0-08	Galway	Gaelic Grounds
