= T. J. Connolly (hurler) =

Irish hurler and manager

Personal information
- Native name: T. S. Ó Conghaile (Irish)
- Born: 1971 (age 54–55) Cashel, County Tipperary, Ireland

Sport
- Sport: Hurling
- Position: Centre-forward
Club
- Years: Club
- Cashel King Cormac's
Club titles
- Tipperary titles: 1
- Munster titles: 1

T. J. Connolly (born 1971) is an Irish retired hurler and former manager of the Tipperary under-21 hurling team.

Born in Cashel, County Tipperary, Connolly first arrived on the inter-county scene as a dual player at the age of seventeen when he first linked up with the Tipperary minor teams, before later joining the under-21 sides. Connolly never played at senior level with Tipperary.

At club level Connolly was a one-time Munster medallist with Cashel King Cormac's. He also won one championship medal.

In retirement from playing, Connolly became involved in team management and coaching. He served as a selector with the Tipperary under-21 team for a number of years, before being appointed manager in 2013. He left the position of under-21 manager in 2015.

== Honours ==
=== Playing honours ===
Cashel King Cormacs

- Munster Senior Club Hurling Championship (1): 1991
- Tipperary Senior Club Hurling Championship (1): 1991

=== Managerial ahonours ===
Tipperary

- All-Ireland Under-21 Hurling Championship (1): 2010
- Munster Under-21 Hurling Championship (1): 2010

Sporting positions
Preceded by Ken Hogan	Tipperary Under-21 Hurling Manager; 2013-2015	Succeeded by William Maher
