= Kevin Tucker (hurler) =

Irish hurler

Personal information
- Native name: Caoimhín Ó Tuachair (Irish)
- Born: 18 September 1975 (age 51) Nenagh, County Tipperary, Ireland
- Height: 5 ft 10 in (178 cm)

Sport
- Sport: Hurling
- Position: Right corner-forward
Club
- Years: Club
- Nenagh Éire Óg
Club titles
- Tipperary titles: 1
College
- Years: College
- Tralee RTC
College titles
- Fitzgibbon titles: 0
Inter-county
Years	County	Apps (scores)
1996-1998	Tipperary	5 (0-09)
Inter-county titles
- Munster titles: 0
- All-Irelands: 0
- NHL: 0
- All Stars: 0

Kevin Tucker (born 18 September 1975) is an Irish hurler who played as a right corner-forward for the Tipperary senior team.

Tucker joined the team during the 1996 championship and was a regular member of the team for just three seasons. An All-Ireland medalist in the under-21 grade, he did not win honours at senior level.

At club level Tucker is a one-time county club championship medalist with the Nenagh Éire Óg club.
