= Aidan Flanagan =

Irish hurler (born 1974)

Personal information
- Native name: Aodhán Ó Flanagáin (Irish)
- Born: 17 August 1974 (age 52) Boherlahan, County Tipperary, Ireland
- Occupation: Company Director
- Height: 5 ft 10 in (178 cm)

Sport
- Sport: Hurling
- Position: Corner-forward
Club
- Years: Club
- Boherlahan–Dualla
Club titles
- Tipperary titles: 1
College(s)
- Years: College
- University College Galway; Garda College
College titles
- Fitzgibbon titles: 0
Inter-county*
Years	County	Apps (scores)
1997	Tipperary	2 (1-01)
Inter-county titles
- Munster titles: 1 U21
- All-Irelands: 1 U21
- NHL: 0
- All Stars: 0
- *Inter County team apps and scores correct as of 22:13, 2 September 2018.

Aidan Flanagan (born 17 August 1974) is an Irish retired hurler who played as a corner-forward for the Tipperary senior hurling team.

== Career statistics ==
Team	Year	National League			Munster		All-Ireland		Total	
Team	Year	Division	Apps	Score	Apps	Score	Apps	Score	Apps	Score
Tipperary	1997	Division 1	8	1-30	1	0-00	1	1-01	10	2-31
Total			8	1-30	1	0-00	1	1-01	10	2-31

== Honours ==
Boherlahen–Dualla

- Tipperary Senior Hurling Championship (1): 1996

Tipperary

- All-Ireland Under-21 Hurling Championship (1): 1995
- Munster Under-21 Hurling Championship (1): 1995

Fitzgibbon Cup with W.I.T. 1995
