= 1995 All-Ireland Under-21 Hurling Championship final =

1995 All-Ireland Under-21 Hurling Championship Final
- Event: 1995 All-Ireland Under-21 Hurling Championship
Tipperary	Kilkenny
1-14	1-10
- Date: 10 September 1995
- Venue: Semple Stadium, Thurles
- Referee: Pat Delaney (Laois)

The 1995 All-Ireland Under-21 Hurling Championship final was a hurling match that was played at Semple Stadium, Thurles on 10 September 1995 to determine the winners of the 1995 All-Ireland Under-21 Hurling Championship, the 32nd season of the All-Ireland Under-21 Hurling Championship, a tournament organised by the Gaelic Athletic Association for the champion teams of the four provinces of Ireland. The final was contested by Tipperary of Munster and Kilkenny of Leinster, with Tipperary winning by 1-14 to 1-10.

== Match ==
=== Details ===
10 September 1995

Tipperary	1-14 - 1-10	Kilkenny
Tommy Dunne 0-7, P O'Dwyer 1-0, K Tucker 0-2, D O'Connor 0-1, D Bourke 0-1, L McGrath 0-1, Terry Dunne 0-1, A Butler 0-1.		D Cleere 0-7, B Ryan 1-2, L Smiith 0-1.

Semple Stadium, Thurles
Referee: T Murray (Limerick)
