= 1993–94 All-Ireland Senior Club Hurling Championship =

All-Ireland Senior Club Hurling Championship 1993–94
Championship Details
- Dates: 26 September 1993 – 17 March 1994
- Teams: 28

All Ireland Champions
- Winners: Sarsfields (2nd win)
- Captain: Packie Cooney
- Manager: Michael Conneely

All Ireland Runners-up
- Runners-up: Toomevara
- Captain: Jody Grace
- Manager: Seán Stack

Provincial Champions
- Munster: Toomevara
- Leinster: St. Rynagh's
- Ulster: Ballycran
- Connacht: Sarsfields

Championship Statistics
- Matches Played: 27
- Top Scorer: Michael Nolan (1–38)

The 1993–94 All-Ireland Senior Club Hurling Championship was the 24th staging of the All-Ireland Senior Club Hurling Championship, the Gaelic Athletic Association's premier inter-county club hurling tournament. The championship ran from 26 September 1993 to 17 March 1993.

Sarsfields entred the championship as the defending champions. Rathmolyon of Meath, Slaughtneil of Derry and Dicksboro of Kilkenny made their championship debuts.

The All-Ireland final was played at Croke Park in Dublin on 17 March 1994, between Sarsfields of Galway and Toomevara of Tipperary, in what was a first championship meeting between the teams. Sarsfields won the match by 1–14 to 3–06 to claim a second consecutive title.

Toomevara's Michael Nolan was the championship's top scorer with 1–38.

== Connacht Senior Club Hurling Championship ==
=== Connacht first round ===
3 October 1993 First round	Craobh Rua	4–06 – 1–02	St. Mary's	Dick Kent Park
	N Fairbanks 3–0, E Bellew 1–2, TJ Brennan 0–2, P Galvin 0–1, P Conlon 0–1.

=== Connacht quarter-final ===
9 October 1993 Quarter-final	Tooreen	2–13 – 0–07	Craobh Rua	Ballyhaunis Grounds
	J Cunnane 0–7, Declan Greally 1–0, C Jordan 1–0, Dom Greally 0–1, G Greally 0–1, K Greally 0–1, J Henry 0–1, F Delaney 0–1, P Tighe 0–1.		P Galvin 0–3, T Brennan 0–2, L Filan 0–1, F Browne 0–1.

=== Connacht semi-final ===
24 October 1993 Semi-final	Tooreen	1–12 – 3–09	Four Roads	Ballyhaunis Grounds
	J Cunnane 1–2, J Henry 0–5, Dom Greally 0–4, K Greally 0–1.		J Mannion 2–2, S Coyle 1–0, D Coyle 0–3, F Grehan 0–2, J Coyle 0–1, R Mulroy 0–1.

=== Connacht final ===
21 November 1993 Final	Four Roads	0–07 – 5–15	Sarsfields	Athleague Sportsfield
	D Coyle 0–3, R Mulry 0–2, G Coyle 0–1, S Coyle 0–1.		J Keane 3–1, M Kenny 1–2, McGrath 1–1, J Cooney 0–4, M Morrissey 0–2, M McGrath 0–2, P Kelly 0–2, P Cooney 0–1.

== Leinster Senior Club Hurling Championship ==
=== Leinster first round ===
23 October 1993 First round	Wolfe Tones	0–06 – 11–23	St Vincent's	Michael Fay Park
	J Lynn 0–4, M Cassidy 0–1, S Browne 0–1.		S McDermott 3–4, A Fagan 2–5, S McHugh 2–0, D Gray 1–3, P Tobin 1–3, T Jennings 1–2, C Barr 1–2, S Fleming 0–4.

24 October 1993 First round	Naomh Moninne	0–09 – 2–12	Brownstown	Páirc an Chuinnigh
	P Dunne 0–3, J Murphy 0–2, P Mulholland 0–2, D Dunne 0–1, J Kennedy 0–1.		P Clancy 0–7, E Dolan 1–1, C Shaw 1–1, M Daly 0–2, A Clancy 0–1.

25 October 1993 First round	St Rynagh's	5–18 – 0–04	Castledermot	St Brendan's Park
	M Duignan 1–7, R Mannion 2–2, F Dolan 1–2, T Moylan 1–1, A Fogarty 0–2, H Rigney 0–2, D Devery 0–2.		C Deering 0–3, H Byrne 0–1.	Referee: I Scully (Laois)

30 October 1993 First round	Kiltegan	4–09 – 3–03	Rathmolyon	St Loman's Park
	A Coleman 3–1, J Keogh 0–5, N Cremin 1–0, R Byrne 0–1, S Byrne 0–1, E Byrne 0–1.		M Cole 1-3, N Hunt 1-0, S Geraghty 1-0.

=== Leinster quarter-finals ===
6 November 1993 Quarter-final	St Rynagh's	2–13 – 1–13	Camross	St Brendan's Park
	M Conneely 0–11, M Duignan 1–0, F Dolan 1–0, T Moylan 0–1, D Devery 0–1.		F Lalor 0–8, R Cuddy 1–0, F Scully 0–1, S Moore 0–1, PJ Cuddy 0–1, M Collier 0–1, O Dowling 0–1.	Referee: D Murphy (Wexford)

7 November 1993 Quarter-final	St Vincent's	1–09 – 3–07	Cloughbawn	Parnell Park
	S McDermott 1–2, P Tobin 0–3, C Barr 0–2, S Fleming 0–1 A Fagan 0–1.		P Carlton 2–3, J Fleming 1–1, T Harrington 0–2, L Murphy 0–1.	Referee: M Sheridan (Kildare)

7 November 1993 Quarter-final	Kiltegan	0–05 – 0–12	Naomh Eoin	Aughrim County Ground
	J Keogh 0–4, C O'Toole 0–1.		J Byrne 0–6, S Foley 0–2, P Quirke 0–2, J O'Neill 0–1, C Jordan 0–1.	Referee: J Guinan (Kilkenny)

13 November 1993 Quarter-final	Brownstown	1–04 – 3–13	Dicksboro	Fr O'Reilly Memorial Park
	P Clancy 1–2, A Clancy 0–1, M Daly 0–1.		D O'Neill 0–8, J Treacy 1–1, J Kerwick 1–0, S Morrissey 1–0, S Kennedy 0–3, N Lacey 0–1.	Referee: M Kiely 9(Dublin)

=== Leinster semi-finals ===
20 November 1993 Semi-final	St Rynagh's	1–14 – 0–07	Naomh Eoin	O'Moore Park
	M Conneely 1–5, F Doran 0–3, D Devery 0–2, M Kenny 0–1, R Mannion 0–1, A Fogarty 0–1, S White 0–1.		J Byrne 0–5, S Foley 0–2.

21 November 1993 Semi-final	Dicksboro	1–05 – 1–04	Cloughbawn	Dr Cullen Park
	J Treacy 1–0, S Kennedy 0–2, T Ball 0–2, S Moore 0–1.		T Harrington 1–3, L Murphy 0–1.	Referee: A Mac Suibhne (Dublin)

=== Leinster final ===
5 December 1993 Final	St Rynagh's	1–14 – 2–10	Dicksboro	O'Moore Park
	M Conneely 0–7, M Duignan 1–0, D Devery 0–2, A Fogarty 0–1, R Mannion 0–1, F Dolan 0–1, T Moylan 0–1, H Rigney 0–1.		D O'Neill 0–5, S Moore 0–4, M Hanrick 1–0, J Treacy 1–0, S Kennedy 0–1.	Referee: D Murphy (Wexford)

== Munster Senior Club Hurling Championship ==
=== Munster quarter-finals ===
24 October 1993 Quarter-final	Toomevara	5–15 – 1–10	Patrickswell	St Micahel's Park
	M Nolan 1–11, K Kennedy 1–2, L Flaherty 1–0, T Carroll 1–0, L Nolan 1–0, Tommy Dunne 0–2.		G Kirby 1–7, D O'Grady 0–2, A Carmody 0–1.

30 October 1993 Quarter-final	Lismore	1–11 – 0–11	Ballyduff	Castle Grounds
	S Daly 0–5, P Quinn 1–0, P Hickey 0–3, P Prendergast 0–2, K O'Gorman 0–1.		M Hennessy 0–9, K Boyle 0–2.	Referee: W Barrett (Tipperary)

=== Munster semi-finals ===
7 November 1993 Semi-final	St. Finbarr's	0–12 – 1–10	Toomevara	St Micahel's Park
	B O'Shea 0–2, I O'Mahony 0–2, M Quaid 0–2, J O'Connor 0–2, F Ramsey 0–1, M Barry 0–1.		M Nolan 0–6, T Carroll 1–1, Tommy Dunne 0–2, K Kennedy 0–1.	Referee: T Murray (Limerick)

7 November 1993 Semi-final	Sixmilebridge	2–09 – 1–04	Lismore	O'Garney Park
	J Chaplin 0–4, E Quane 1–0, D Chaplin 1–0, M Conlon 0–2, C Chaplin 0–1, F Quilligan 0–1, P Morey 0–1.		S Daly 1–0, M Hickey 0–3, K O'Gorman 0–1.

=== Munster final ===
21 November 1993 Final	Toomevara	0–15 – 0–07	Sixmilebridge	Gaelic Grounds
	M Nolan 0–8, M Murphy 0–2, Tommy Dunne 0–2, P King 0–1, L Flaherty 0–1, T Carroll 0–1.		G McInerney 0–5, N Earley 0–1, C Chaplin 0–1.	Referee: P O'Connor (Limerick)

== Ulster Senior Club Hurling Championship ==
=== Ulster semi-finals ===
26 September 1993 Semi-final	Ruairí Óg, Cushendall	6–17 – 0–10	Slaughtneil	St Patrick's Park
	B McNaughten 2-3, C McCambridge 1-5, D Connolly 2-0, M McCambridge 1-3, J Carson 0-4, A mcGuile 0-2.		D Cassidy 0-6, P Scullion 0-2, C McEldowney 0-1, J Cassidy 0-1.

26 September 1993 Semi-final	Keady Lámh Dhearg	1–08 – 1–18	Ballycran	McGleenan Park
	S Hughes 0-5, P Farrell 1-0, V Mone 0-1, E McKee 0-1, M McGuinness 0-1.		D O'Prey 1-8, M Blaney 0-4, K Blaney 0-3, J McCarthy 0-2, C Arthurs 0-1.

=== Ulster final ===
24 October 1993 Final	Ruairí Óg, Cushendall	0–12 – 2–10	Ballycran	Casement Park
	C McCambridge 0–6, S McNaughten 0–2, P Walsh 0–2, J Carson 0–1, M McCambridge 0–1.		K Blaney 1–2, M Braniff 1–0, D Hughes 0–2, C Arthurs 0–2, D O'Prey 0–2, S Mallon 0–1, P Braniff 0–1.

== All-Ireland Senior Club Hurling Championship ==
=== All-Ireland quarter-final ===
5 December 1993 Quarter-final	Seán Treacy's	0–05 – 2–14	Sarsfields	Emerald GAA Grounds
	M Fleming 0–3, T Moloney 0–2.		A Donoghue 0–5, M McGrath 1–1, P Cooney 1–0, J Cooney 0–3, M Kenny 0–2, J Keane 0–2, P Kelly 0–1.	Referee: P Delaney (Laois)

=== All-Ireland semi-finals ===
20 February 1994 Semi-final	Toomevara	1–13 – 1–05	Ballycran	Croke Park
	M Nolan 0–9, T Carroll 1–0, M Murphy 0–2, T Delaney 0–1, J McCarthy 0–1.		H Gilmore 1–0, G Savage 0–3, D Hughes 0–1, J McCarthy 0–1.	Referee: D Murphy (Wexford)

20 February 1994 Semi-final	Sarsfields	1–11 – 1–07	St. Rynagh's	Semple Stadium
	M Kenny 1–0, J McGrath 0–2, M McGrath 0–2, P Cooney 0–2, P Kelly 0–2, J Cooney 0–1, A Donoghue 0–1, N Morrissey 0–1.		M Conneely 1–1, R Mannion 0–3, A Fogarty 0–2, T Moylan 0–1.	Referee: T Murray (Limerick)

=== All-Ireland final ===
17 March 1994 Final	Sarsfields	1–14 – 3–06	Toomevara	Croke Park
	A Donoghue 0–9, M Kenny 1–1, Pádraig Kelly 0–1, Peter Kelly 0–1, J Cooney 0–1, J McGrath 0–1.		T Dunne 1–1, M Nolan 0–4, K Kennedy 1–0, L Nolan 1–0, P Shanahan 0–1.	Attendance: 13,392; Referee: P Horan (Offaly)

== Championship statistics ==
=== Top scorers ===
Rank	Player	County	Tally	Total	Matches	Average
1	Michael Nolan	Toomevara	1–38	41	5	8.20
2	Micheál Conneely	St Rynagh's	2–24	30	5	6.00
3	Seánie McDermott	St Vincent's	4-06	18	2	9.00
4	Michael Duignan	St Rynagh's	3-07	16	5	3.20
5	Aidan Donoghue	Sarsfields	0–15	15	3	5.00
6	Michael Kenny	Sarsfields	3-05	14	4	3.50
6	Roy Mannion	St Rynagh's	2-08	14	5	3.20
6	Conor McCambridge	Ruairí Óg	1–11	14	2	7.00
9	Dermot O'Prey	Ballycran	1–10	13	3	4.33
9	Dan O'Neill	Dicksboro	0–13	13	3	4.33

=== Miscellaneous ===
- Ballycran won the Ulster Club Championship for the first time since 1976.
