= 1996 All-Ireland Minor Hurling Championship =

All-Ireland Minor Hurling Championship 1996
Championship Details
- Dates: 1 May 1996 - 29 September 1996

All Ireland Champions
- Winners: Tipperary (16th win)
- Captain: William Maher
- Manager: Dinny Cahill

All Ireland Runners-up
- Runners-up: Galway
- Captain: Michael Healy
- Manager: Noel Lane

Provincial Champions
- Munster: Tipperary
- Leinster: Kilkenny
- Ulster: Antrim
- Connacht: Not Played

Championship Statistics
- Top Scorer: Eugene O'Neill (3-48)

The 1996 All-Ireland Minor Hurling Championship was the 66th staging of the All-Ireland Minor Hurling Championship since its establishment by the Gaelic Athletic Association in 1928. The championship began on 1 May 1996 and ended on 29 September 1996.

Cork entered the championship as the defending champions, however, they were beaten by Tipperary in the Munster semi-final.

On 29 September 1996 Tipperary won the championship following a 2-14 to 2-12 defeat of Galway in a replay of the All-Ireland final. This was their 16th All-Ireland title and their first title since 1982.

Tipperary's Eugene O'Neill was the championship's top scorer with 3-48.

== Results ==
=== Leinster Minor Hurling Championship ===
First round

11 May 1996 First round	Dublin	4-18 - 1-03	Westmeath	O'Connor Park, Tullamore
	R Farrelly 2-1, E Carroll 1-4, S McDonnell 1-2, S Martin 0-4, T McGrane 0-3, L Ryan 0-2, M Kenny 0-1, S Ryan 0-1.		G Briody 1-1, D McCormack 0-2.	Referee: O O'Neill (Meath)

Quarter-final

25 May 1996 Quarter-final	Laois	3-06 - 2-12	Dublin	O'Connor Park, Tullamore
	G Walsh 1-1, D Rooney 1-1, B Delaney 1-0, N O'Shaughnessy 0-3, T Doran 0-1.		E Carroll 1-3, R Farrelly 1-2, T McGrane 0-3, M Kenny 0-2, S Martin 0-2.

Semi-finals

29 June 1996 Semi-final	Offaly	2-06 - 0-12	Dublin	O'Moore Park, Portlaoise
	P Leonard 1-1, D Kelly 1-0, G Oakley 0-2, R McRedmond 0-1, T Spain 0-1, J Greene 0-1.		T McGrane 0-5, S McDonnell 0-3, E Carroll 0-2, S Ryan 0-2.	Referee: C Byrne (Wicklow)

29 June 1996 Semi-final	Wexford	2-10 - 3-07	Kilkenny	Wexford Park, Wexford
	M Redmond 1-2, J Kenny 0-5, J O'Loughlin 1-0, C Carey 0-3.		J Coogan 1-2, S Millea 1-1, JP O'Neill 1-1, R Cahill 0-2, M Kavanagh 0-1.	Referee: O O'Neill (Meath)

6 July 1996 Semi-final	Offaly	3-12 - 3-15	Dublin	O'Moore Park, Portlaoise
	R McRedmond 2-2, M Hand 1-0, P Carroll 0-3, E McGuinness 0-2, C Cassidy 0-1, P Leonard 0-1, Darragh Kelly 0-1, Declan Kelly 0-1, T Spain 0-1.		T McGrane 0-7, E Carroll 1-3, S McDonnell 0-4, D Foley 1-0, L Ryan 1-0, S Ryan 0-1.	Referee: C Byrne (Wicklow)

6 July 1996 Semi-final replay	Kilkenny	2-13 - 0-04	Wexford	Nowlan Park, Kilkenny
	J Coogan 0-4, R Cahill 0-4, J Hickey 1-0, JP O'Neill 1-0, M Hoyne 0-3, R Mullally 0-2.		J Kenny 0-2, M Redmond 0-1, J Hendrick 0-1.	Referee: O O'Neill (Meath)

Final

14 July 1996 Final	Kilkenny	1-16 - 1-11	Dublin	Croke Park, Dublin
	R Cahill 0-8, J Coogan 0-4, S Millea 1-0, M Hoyne 0-1, H Shefflin 0-1, JP O'Neill 0-1, G Kirwan 0-1.		T McGrane 0-9, E Carroll 1-1, D Carew 0-1.	Referee: P Delaney (Laois)

=== Munster Minor Hurling Championship ===
First round

1 May 1996 First round	Tipperary	2-14 - 0-05	Limerick	Semple Stadium, Thurles
	E O'Neill 1-4, P Kelly 1-1, M Kennedy 0-3, W Maher 0-2, A Doyle 0-1, J Carroll 0-1, D Fahy 0-1, M Ryan 0-1.		M Mangan 0-3, N Hayes 0-2.	Referee: M Wadding (Waterford)

10 May 1996 First round	Kerry	2-08 - 2-13	Clare	Ballyduff
	L Boyle 1-2, B McElligott 1-0, M Murphy 0-2, T Roche 0-2, M Murnane 0-1, P Galvin 0-1.		S Ryan 0-8, D Fitzgerald 2-0, A Markham 0-2, P Moloney 0-1, B O'Halloran 0-1, A Markham 0-1.	Referee: J Sexton (Limerick)

Second round

26 June 1996 Semi-final	Tipperary	0-16 - 1-09	Cork	Semple Stadium, Thurles
	E O'Neill 0-7, A Doyle 0-4, S Ryan 0-2, M Kennedy 0-1, M Ryan 0-1, P O'Brien 0-1.		A Beale 1-3, J Murphy 0-2, N Ronan 0-1, S O'Connor 0-1, N Morrissey 0-1, J O'Connor 0-1.

26 June 1996 Semi-final	Waterford	2-13 - 2-13	Clare	Semple Stadium, Thurles
	K McGrath 1-9, R Walsh 1-0, S O'Flynn 0-1, O Murphy 0-1, A Heffernan 0-1, O Bennett 0-1.		S Ryan 1-4, C McKeogh 1-0, A Markham 0-3, D Fitzgerald 0-2, J Horan 0-2, J Reddan 0-1, A Markham 0-1.	Referee: J McDonald (Tipperary)

29 June 1996 Semi-final replay	Waterford	1-14 - 1-11	Clare	Semple Stadium, Thurles
	K McGrath 0-9, R Walsh 1-0, S Flynn 0-3, O Bennett 0-1, K Reid 0-1.		D Fitzgrald 1-0, S Ryan 0-3, A Markham 0-3, O Plunkett 0-2, G O'Donnell 0-1, C McKeogh 0-1, J Reddan 0-1.	Referee: J McDonald (Tipperary)

Final

7 July 1996 Final	Tipperary	2-19 - 1-11	Waterford	Gaelic Grounds, Limerick
	E O'Neill 1-11, A Doyle 1-0, M Kennedy 0-3, M Ryan 0-2, P Kelly 0-1, E Carey 0-1, D Browne 0-1.		K McGrath 0-7, F Halpin 1-0, E Murphy 0-3, E Bennett 0-1.	Referee: S McMahon (Clare)

=== Ulster Minor Hurling Championship ===
Semi-finals

7 July 1996 Semi-final replay	Derry	2-09 - 1-10	Down	Casement Park, Belfast
	E Farren 1-3, D Collins 1-2, P McCloskey 0-2, R Kennedy 0-1, D Kearney 0-1.		S McGrattan 0-4, C Branniff 1-0, P Mulligan 0-2, P Matthews 0-2, E Trainor 0-1, D Curran 0-1.

Final

14 July 1996 Final	Antrim	3-13 - 2-10	Derry	Casement Park, Belfast

=== All-Ireland Minor Hurling Championship ===
Semi-finals

4 August 1996 Semi-final	Galway	3-16 - 1-14	Kilkenny	Croke Park, Dublin
	E Cloonan 0-11, A Poniard 2-0, R Cullinane 1-1, D Loughrey 0-2, M Blake 0-1, E McEntee 0-1.		J Coogan 0-6, R Cahill 0-5, J Hickey 1-0, T O'Dowd 0-1, J Hoyne 0-1, M Hoyne 0-1.

11 August 1996 Semi-final	Tipperary	2-25 - 3-03	Antrim	Croke Park, Dublin
	M Kennedy 2-5, S O'Neill 0-10, P O'Brien 0-4, P Kelly 0-2, M Ryan 0-2, E Carey 0-2.		C McGrath 2-1, G Ward 1-0, J Flynn 0-2.	Referee: P Horan (Offaly)

Finals

1 September 1996 Final	Tipperary	0-20 - 3-11	Galway	Croke Park, Dublin
	E O'Neill 0-8, A Doyle 0-4, M Kennedy 0-2, D Fahy 0-2, W Maher 0-1, E Carey 0-1, P Kelly 0-1, M Ryan 0-1.		A Poniard 2-1, E Cloonan 0-7, M Kerins 1-1, E McEntee 0-1, D Loughrey 0-1.	Referee: J O'Leary (Cork)

29 September 1996 Final replay	Tipperary	2-14 - 2-12	Galway	Croke Park, Dublin
	E O'Neill 1-8, M Kennedy 1-2, W Maher 0-2, D Browne 0-1, D Fahy 0-1.		E Cloonan 2-5, R Cullinane 0-2, E McEntee 0-1, M Kerins 0-1, R Gantley 0-1, D Loughrey 0-1, A Poniard 0-1.

== Championship statistics ==
=== Top scorers ===
Top scorer overall

Rank	Player	Club	Tally	Total	Matches	Average
1	Eugene O'Neill	Tipperary	3-48	57	6	9.50
2	Eugene Cloonan	Galway	2-23	29	3	9.66
3	Ken McGrath	Waterford	1-25	28	3	9.33
4	Tomás McGrane	Dublin	0-27	27	5	5.40
5	Michael Kennedy	Tipperary	3-16	25	6	3.83

=== Miscellaneous ===
- The All-Ireland final ended in a draw for the first time since 1984.
