= 1993 Tipperary Senior Hurling Championship =

Annual hurling competition season

- Dates: 12 September 1993 – 10 October 1993
- Teams: 8
- Sponsor: Nenagh Co-Op
- Champions: Toomevara (12th title); Jody Grace (captain); Seán Stack (manager)
- Runners-up: Nenagh Éire Óg; John Heffernan (captain); Liam Heffernan (manager)

Tournament statistics
- Matches played: 7
- Goals scored: 13 (1.86 per match)
- Points scored: 164 (23.43 per match)
- Top scorer(s): Michael Nolan (0-25)

The 1993 Tipperary Senior Hurling Championship was the 102nd staging of the Tipperary Senior Hurling Championship since its establishment by the Tipperary County Board in 1887. The championship began on 12 September 1993 and ended on 10 October 1993.

Toomevara were the defending champions.

On 10 October 1993, Toomevara won the championship after a 1–14 to 1–13 defeat of Nenagh Éire Óg in the final at Semple Stadium. It was their 12th championship title overall and their second title in succession.

== Sponsorship ==
For the first time ever, the Tipperary Senior Hurling Championship was sponsored. The sponsors were Nenagh Co-Op and the amount of the sponsorship, which was "substantial" according to county chairman Michael Maguire, wasn't revealed.

== Qualification ==
Division	Championship	Champions	Runners-up
Mid	Mid Tipperary Senior Hurling Championship	Thurles Sarsfields	Holycross-Ballycahill
North	North Tipperary Senior Hurling Championship	Nenagh Éire Óg	Moneygall
South	South Tipperary Senior Hurling Championship	Mullinahone	Carrick Swans
West	West Tipperary Senior Hurling Championship	Cashel King Cormacs	Kickhams

== Results ==
=== Quarter-finals ===
12 September 1993 Quarter-final	Holycross-Ballycahill	1-12 - 2-06	Mullinahone	Golden
	D Carr 0-5, P Maher 1-0, D Burke 0-3, S Dwane 0-2, T Lanigan 0-2.		B O'Meara 1-1, J Leahy 0-4, P Croke 1-0, T Tobin 0-1.	Referee: R Barry (Cappawhite)

12 September 1993 Quarter-final	Thurles Sarsfields	4-08 - 1-08	Carrick Swans	Golden
	S Quinn 2-1, B Carroll 0-5, P Maher 1-1, E Enright 1-0, L Duggan 0-1.		B White 1-0, MJ Russell 0-3, M Whelan 0-3, B Hahessy 0-2.	Referee: M Cahill (Kilruane MacDonaghs)

12 September 1993 Quarter-final	Toomevara	1-17 - 1-04	Cashel King Cormacs	Páirc Shíleáin, Templemore
	M Nolan 0-13, K Kennedy 1-1, P King 0-1, Tommy Dunne 0-1, T Carroll 0-1.		Conal Bonnar 0-4, Cormac Bonnar 1-0.	Referee: T Lonergan

12 September 1993 Quarter-final	Nenagh Éire Óg	1-14 - 0-12	Kickhams	Páirc Shíleáin, Templemore
	J Kennedy 1-3, M Cleary 0-6, J Heffernan 0-2, R Tomlinson 0-1, E Tucker 0-1, K Tucker 0-1.		T Farrell 0-6, J McCormack 0-3, V Kelly 0-2, A Qualter 0-1.

=== Semi-finals ===
26 September 1993 Semi-final	Nenagh Éire Óg	0-15 - 0-14	Holycross-Ballycahill	Semple Stadium, Thurles
	M Cleary 0-9, K Tucker 0-4, J Kennedy 0-1, R Tomlinson 0-1.		S Dwan 0-6, D Burke 0-4, T Lanigan 0-2, P Lanigan 0-1, D Quinlan 0-1.	Referee: T Lonergan (Kilsheelan)

26 September 1993 Semi-final	Toomevara	0-18 - 0-09	Holycross-Ballycahill	Semple Stadium, Thurles
	M Nolan 0-7, T Delaney 0-3, Tommy Dunne 0-3, T Carroll 0-2, L Flaherty 0-1, P King 0-1, J Ryan 0-1.		C Maher 0-5, S Quinn 0-2, J Dorney 0-1, B Carroll 0-1.	Referee: W Barrett (Ardfinnan)

=== Final ===
10 October 1993 Final	Toomevara	1-14 - 1-13	Nenagh Éire Óg	Semple Stadium, Thurles
	T Carroll 1-2, M Nolan 0-5, Tommy Dunne 0-3, M Murphy 0-2, K Kennedy 0-1, T Delaney 0-1.		M Cleary 0-9, P Dolan 1-1, E Tucker 0-2, K Tucker 0-1.	Referee: P Lonergan (Galtee Rovers)

== Championship statistics ==
=== Top scorers ===
Top scorers overall

Rank	Player	Club	Tally	Total	Matches	Average
1	Mike Nolan	Toomevara	0-25	25	3	8.33
2	Michael Cleary	Nenagh Éire Óg	0-24	24	3	8.00
3	Séamus Quinn	Thurles Sarsfields	2-03	9	2	4.50
4	Tommy Carroll	Toomevara	1-05	8	3	2.66
4	Stephen Dwan	Holycross-Ballycahill	0-08	8	2	4.00
6	John Kennedy	Nenagh Éire Óg	1-04	7	3	2.33
6	Tommy Dunne	Toomevara	0-07	7	3	2.33
6	David Burke	Holycross-Ballycahill	0-07	7	2	3.50
9	Tony Farrell	Kickhams	0-06	6	1	6.00
9	Bill Carroll	Thurles Sarsfields	0-06	6	2	3.00
9	Kevin Tucker	Nenagh Éire Óg	0-06	6	2	3.00

Top scorers in a single game

Rank	Player	Club	Tally	Total	Opposition
1	Mike Nolan	Toomevara	0-13	13	Cashel King Cormacs
2	Michael Cleary	Nenagh Éire Óg	0-09	9	Holycross-Ballycahill
2	Michael Cleary	Nenagh Éire Óg	0-09	9	Toomevara
4	Séamus Quinn	Thurles Sarsfields	2-01	7	Carrick Swans
4	Mike Nolan	Toomevara	0-07	7	Thurles Sarsfields
6	John Kennedy	Nenagh Éire Óg	1-03	6	Kickhams
6	Michael Cleary	Nenagh Éire Óg	0-06	6	Kickhams
6	Tony Farell	Kickhams	0-06	6	Nenagh Éire Óg
6	Stephen Dwan	Holycross-Ballycahill	0-06	6	Nenagh Éire Óg
10	Tommy Carroll	Toomevara	1-02	5	Nenagh Éire Óg
10	Declan Carr	Holycross-Ballycahill	0-05	5	Mullinahone
10	Bill Carroll	Thurles Sarsfields	0-05	5	Carrick Swans
10	Connie Maher	Holycross-Ballycahill	0-05	5	Toomevara
10	Mike Nolan	Toomevara	0-05	5	Nenagh Éire Óg
