= 1994 Tipperary Senior Hurling Championship =

Annual hurling competition season

- Dates: 27 August – 2 October 1994
- Teams: 8
- Sponsor: Nenagh Co-Op
- Champions: Toomevara (13th title); Pat Meagher (captain); Seán Stack (manager)
- Runners-up: Cashel King Cormacs; Colm Bonnar (captain); Justin McCarthy (manager)

Tournament statistics
- Matches played: 7
- Goals scored: 20 (2.86 per match)
- Points scored: 175 (25 per match)
- Top scorer(s): Tommy Dunne (2-18)

The 1994 Tipperary Senior Hurling Championship was the 103rd staging of the Tipperary Senior Hurling Championship since its establishment by the Tipperary County Board in 1887. The championship began on 27 August 1994 and ended on 2 October 1994.

Toomevara were the defending champions.

On 2 October 1994, Toomevara won the championship after a 3–11 to 1–09 defeat of Cashel King Cormacs in the final at Semple Stadium. It was their 13th championship title overall and their third title in succession.

== Qualification ==
Division	Championship	Champions	Runners-up
Mid	Mid Tipperary Senior Hurling Championship	Loughmore-Castleiney	Thurles Sarsfields
North	North Tipperary Senior Hurling Championship	Toomevara	Kilruane MacDonaghs
South	South Tipperary Senior Hurling Championship	Ballingarry	Mullinahone
West	West Tipperary Senior Hurling Championship	Cashel King Cormacs	Clonoulty-Rossmore

== Results ==
=== Quarter-finals ===
27 August 1994 Quarter-final	Toomevara	2-16 - 0-09	Thurles Sarsfields	Páirc Shíleáin
	Tommy Dunne 1-6, T Carroll 1-0, T Delaney 0-3, K Kennedy 0-2, J Dunne 0-2, M Murphy 0-1, G Frend 0-1, Terry Dunne 0-1.		J Enright 0-4, E Enright 0-3, S Maher 0-1, P McCormack 0-1.	Referee: TJ Corby (Clonmel)

28 August 1994 Quarter-final	Kilruane MacDonaghs	1-14 - 1-11	Loughmore-Castleiney	MacDonagh Park
	D Quinlan 0-12, D Cahill 1-1, J Williams 0-1.		S Bohan 1-6, J Cormack 0-2, M McGrath 0-2, P McGrath 0-1.	Referee: C O'Sullivan

28 August 1994 Quarter-final	Cashel King Cormacs	1-19 - 1-07	Mullinahone	Kilsheelan Grounds
	R Ryan 0-8, TS Connolly 1-3, A Bonnar 0-3, S O'Donoghue 0-2, C Bonnar 0-1, M Butler 0-1, S Sherry 0-1.		J Leahy 1-6, P Croke 0-1.

28 August 1994 Quarter-final	Clonoulty-Rossmore	0-20 - 0-04	Ballingarry	Kilsheelan Grounds
	D Ryan 0-5, D Quirke 0-5, T Ryan 0-3, K Ryan 0-2, N Keane 0-1, A Butler 0-1, J Hayes 0-1, M Quirke 0-1, M Heffernan 0-1.		S Butler 0-2, D Lyons 0-1, P Ivors 0-1.	Referee: W Clohessy (Drom-Inch)

=== Semi-finals ===
11 September 1994 Semi-final	Toomevara	4-17 - 1-12	Clonoulty-Rossmore	Semple Stadium
	Tommy Dunne 0-8, T Delaney 2-1, K Kennedy 2-1, L Nolan 0-3, J Grace 0-2, M O'Meara 0-1, Terry Dunne 0-1.		M Quirke 1-1, D Ryan 0-4, D Quirke 0-4, Kenny Ryan 0-1, Kevin Ryan 0-1, M Hughes 0-1.

11 September 1994 Semi-final	Cashel King Cormacs	3-19 - 2-07	Kilruane MacDonaghs	Semple Stadium
	R Ryan 0-9, A Bonnar 2-1, S Slattery 1-2, TJ Connolly 0-5, Conal Bonnar 0-1, W Fitzelle 0-1.		D Quinlan 1-5, D Cahill 1-0, J Banaghan 0-1, M O'Leary 0-1.	Referee: M Doyle (Holycross-Ballycahill)

=== Final ===
2 October 1994 Final	Toomevara	3-11 - 1-09	Cashel King Cormacs	Semple Stadium
	Tommy Dunne 1-4, T Carroll 1-1, Terry Dunne 1-0, K Kennedy 0-2, M O'Meara 0-1, L Nolan 0-1, L Flaherty 0-1, M Murphy 0-1.		J Ryan 1-1, R Ryan 0-4, TJ Connolly 0-1, S O'Donoghue 0-1, M Perdue 0-1, W Fitzelle 0-1.	Referee: M Doyle (Holycross-Ballycahill)

== Championship statistics ==
=== Top scorers ===
Top scorers overall

Rank	Player	Club	Tally	Total	Matches	Average
1	Tommy Dunne	Toomevara	2-18	24	3	8.00
2	Raymie Ryan	Cashel King Cormacs	0-21	21	3	7.00
3	David Quinlan	Kilruane MacDonaghs	1-17	20	2	10.00
4	T. J. Connolly	Cashel King Cormacs	1-09	12	3	4.00
5	Kevin Kennedy	Toomevara	2-05	11	3	3.66
6	Ailbe Bonnar	Cashel King Cormacs	2-04	10	3	3.33
6	Tony Delaney	Toomevara	2-04	10	3	3.33
8	Séamus Bohan	Loughmore-Castleiney	1-06	9	1	9.00
8	John Leahy	Mullinahone	1-06	9	1	9.00
8	Declan Ryan	Clonoulty-Rossmore	0-09	9	2	4.50
8	Dan Quirke	Clonoulty-Rossmore	0-09	9	2	4.50

Top scorers in a single game

Rank	Player	Club	Tally	Total	Opposition
1	David Quinlan	Kilruane MacDonaghs	0-12	12	Loughmore-Castleiney
2	Tommy Dunne	Toomevara	1-06	9	Thurles Sarsfields
2	Séamus Bohan	Loughmore-Castleiney	1-06	9	Kilruane MacDonaghs
2	John Leahy	Mullinahone	1-06	9	Cashel King Cormacs
2	Raymie Ryan	Cashel King Cormacs	0-09	9	Kilruane MacDonaghs
6	David Quinlan	Kilruane MacDonaghs	1-05	8	Cashel King Cormacs
6	Raymie Ryan	Cashel King Cormacs	0-08	8	Mullinahone
6	Tommy Dunne	Toomevara	0-08	8	Clonoulty-Rossmore
9	Tony Delaney	Toomevara	2-01	7	Clonoulty-Rossmore
9	Kevin Kennedy	Toomevara	2-01	7	Clonoulty-Rossmore
9	Ailbe Bonnar	Cashel King Cormacs	2-01	7	Mullinahone
9	Tommy Dunne	Toomevara	1-04	7	Cashel King Cormacs
