= 1992 Tipperary Senior Hurling Championship =

Annual hurling competition season

- Dates: 13 September – 8 November 1992
- Teams: 8
- Champions: Toomevara (11th title); Michael O'Meara (captain); Pad Joe Whelehan (manager)
- Runners-up: Thurles Sarsfields; Eamon Walshe (captain); Tom Barry (manager)

Tournament statistics
- Matches played: 9
- Goals scored: 17 (1.89 per match)
- Points scored: 171 (19 per match)
- Top scorer(s): Michael Cleary (3-15)

The 1992 Tipperary Senior Hurling Championship was the 101st staging of the Tipperary Senior Hurling Championship since its establishment by the Tipperary County Board in 1887. The championship began on 13 September 1992 and ended on 8 November 1992.

Cashel King Cormacs were the defending champions, however, they were defeated by Loughmore-Castleiney at the quarter-final stage.

On 8 November 1992, Toomevara won the championship after a 0–12 to 1–06 defeat of Thurles Sarsfields in a final replay at Semple Stadium. It was their 11th championship title overall and their first title since 1960.

== Participating teams ==
Championship	Champions	Runners-up
Mid Tipperary Senior Hurling Championship	Loughmore-Castleiney	Thurles Sarsfields
North Tipperary Senior Hurling Championship	Nenagh Éire Óg	Toomevara
South Tipperary Senior Hurling Championship	Ballingarry	Killenaule
West Tipperary Senior Hurling Championship	Clonoulty-Rossmore	Cashel King Cormacs

== Results ==
=== Quarter-finals ===
13 September 1992 Quarter-final	Toomevara	2-09 - 0-10	Ballingarry	Semple Stadium, Thurles
	M Nolan 1-2, Tommy Dunne 1-1, M Murphy 0-2, L Nolan 0-2, Terry Dunne 0-1, L Flaherty 0-1.		P Ivors 0-5, S Butler 0-3, S Ivors 0-1, D Lyons 0-1.

13 September 1992 Quarter-final	Nenagh Éire Óg	3-14 - 0-07	Killenaule	Semple Stadium, Thurles
	M Cleary 1-6, J Kennedy 1-2, N Corbett 1-0, E Tucker 0-2, P Dolan 0-1, R Burns 0-1, M Kennedy 0-1, R Tomlinson 0-1.		D O'Connell 0-2, Joe O'Dwyer 0-2, John O'Dwyer 0-1, P Shelly 0-1, M Lahart 0-1.	Referee: M Doyle (Holycross-Ballycahill)

27 September 1992 Quarter-final	Thurles Sarsfields	0-06 - 0-05	Clonoulty-Rossmore	Boherlahan
	C Maher 0-3, B Carroll 0-2, M McCormack 0-1.		D Ryan 0-3, D Quirke 0-1, M Quirke 0-1.	Referee: M Cahill (Kilruane MacDonaghs)

27 September 1992 Quarter-final	Loughmore-Castleiney	2-12 - 2-06	Cashel King Cormacs	Boherlahan
	J Cormac 1-2, S Bohan 1-0, T McGrath 0-3, M McGrath 0-3, L Cormac 0-2, N Ryan 0-2.		Cormac Bonnar 2-0, J Grogan 0-2, J Connolly 0-2, Conal Bonnar 0-2.	Referee: M Lenihan (Ballinahinch)

=== Semi-finals ===
11 October 1992 Semi-final	Toomevara	0-11 - 0-09	Loughmore-Castleiney	Semple Stadium, Thurles
	M Nolan 0-5, Terry Dunne 0-3, Tommy Dunne 0-2, L Nolan 0-1.		T McGrath 0-6, S Bohan 0-3.	Referee: P Lonergan (Bansha)

11 October 1992 Semi-final	Thurles Sarsfields	1-12 - 1-12	Nenagh Éire Óg	Semple Stadium, Thurles
	L Duggan 1-0, M McCormack 0-3, S Quinn 0-3, B Carroll 0-2, C Maher 0-2, P Maher 0-2.		R Tomlinson 1-2, M Cleary 0-5, N Corbett 0-1, E Tucker 0-1, J Kennedy 0-1, P Kennedy 0-1, P Dolan 0-1.	Referee: T Lonergan (Kilsheelan)

18 October 1992 Semi-final replay	Thurles Sarsfields	2-15 - 2-06	Nenagh Éire Óg	MacDonagh Park, Cloughjordan
	B Carroll 1-4, C Maher 0-6, L Duggan 1-0, S Quinn 0-2, G O'Connor 0-2, S O'Shea 0-1.		M Cleary 2-4, M Kennedy 0-2.

=== Finals ===
1 November 1992 Final	Toomevara	0-11 - 1-08	Thurles Sarsfields	Semple Stadium, Thurles
	Tommy Dunne 0-2, M Nolan 0-2, L Nolan 0-2, T Delaney 0-2, Terry Dunne 0-1, M Murphy 0-1, P King 0-1.		S Quinn 1-2, C Maher 0-4, S O'Shea 0-1, J Dorney 0-1.	Referee: T Lonergan (Kilsheelan)

8 November 1992 Final replay	Toomevara	0-12 - 1-06	Thurles Sarsfields	Semple Stadium, Thurles
	L Nolan 0-6, M Nolan 0-2, Tommy Dunne 0-2, P Shanahan 0-1, Terry Dunne 0-1.		C Maher 1-5, S Quinn 0-1.	Referee: T Lonergan (Kilsheelan)

== Championship statistics ==
=== Top scorers ===
Top scorers overall

Rank	Player	Club	Tally	Total	Matches	Average
1	Michael Cleary	Nenagh Éire Óg	3-15	24	3	8.00
2	Connie Maher	Thurles Sarsfields	1-20	23	5	4.60
3	Mike Nolan	Toomevara	1-11	14	4	3.50
4	Brendan Carroll	Thurles Sarsfields	1-08	11	4	2.75
4	Séamus Quinn	Thurles Sarsfields	1-08	11	4	2.75
4	Liam Nolan	Toomevara	0-11	11	4	2.7
7	Tommy Dunne	Toomevara	1-07	10	4	2.50
8	Tom McGrath	Loughmore-Castleiney	0-09	9	2	4.50

Top scorers in a single game

Rank	Player	Club	Tally	Total	Opposition
1	Michael Cleary	Nenagh Éire Óg	2-04	10	Thurles Sarsfields
2	Michael Cleary	Nenagh Éire Óg	1-06	9	Killenaule
3	Connie Maher	Thurles Sarsfields	1-05	8	Toomevara
4	Brendan Carroll	Thurles Sarsfields	1-04	7	Nenagh Éire Óg
5	Cormac Bonnar	Cahel King Cormacs	2-00	6	Loughmore-Castleiney
5	Tom McGrath	Loughmore-Castleiney	0-06	6	Toomevara
5	Connie Maher	Thurles Sarsfields	0-06	6	Nenagh Éire Óg
5	Liam Nolan	Toomevara	0-06	6	Thurles Sarsfields
9	Mike Nolan	Toomevara	1-02	5	Ballingarry
9	John Kennedy	Nenagh Éire Óg	1-02	5	Killenaule
9	John Cormac	Loughmore-Castleiney	1-02	5	Cashel King Cormacs
9	Robbie Tomlinson	Nenagh Éire Óg	1-02	5	Thurles Sarsfields
9	Séamus Quinn	Thurles Sarsfields	1-02	5	Toomevara
9	Patrick Ivors	Ballingarry	0-05	5	Toomevara
9	Mike Nolan	Toomevara	0-05	5	Loughmore-Castleiney
9	Michael Cleary	Nenagh Éire Óg	0-05	5	Thurles Sarsfields

=== Miscellaneous ===
- Toomevara won the championship for the first time since 1960.
