= 1994 All-Ireland Senior Club Hurling Championship final =

1994 All-Ireland Senior Club Hurling Championship Final
- Event: 1993–94 All-Ireland Senior Club Hurling Championship
Sarsfields	Toomevara
1-14	3-6
- Date: 17 March 1994
- Venue: Croke Park, Dublin
- Referee: Pat Horan (Offaly)
- Attendance: 13,392

The 1994 All-Ireland Senior Club Hurling Championship final was a hurling match played at Croke Park on 17 March 1994 to determine the winners of the 1993–94 All-Ireland Senior Club Hurling Championship, the 24th season of the All-Ireland Senior Club Hurling Championship, a tournament organised by the Gaelic Athletic Association for the champion clubs of the four provinces of Ireland. The final was contested by Sarsfields of Galway and Toomevara of Tipperary, with Sarsfields winning by 1–14 to 3–6.

The All-Ireland final was a unique occasion as it was the first-ever championship meeting between Sarsfields and Toomevara. It remains their only championship meeting in the All-Ireland series. Sarsfields were hoping to become the first team to retain the title while Toomevara were hoping to make their own history by winning their first All-Ireland title.

The free-taking of Aidan Donoghue was key to Sarsfields' success. Goals in the 13th, 29th and 44th minutes gave Toomevara a three-point lead, however, Sarsfields equalized with a 65th-minute goal from Michael Kenny after a Joe Cooney pass. Sarsfields added two more points for the win.

Sarsfields victory allowed them to become the first team to retain the All-Ireland Club title.

== Match ==
=== Details ===
17 March 1994

Sarsfields	1-14 - 3-6	Toomevara
A Donoghue 0-9 (6f and 1 '70'), M Kenny 1-1, Peter Kelly 0-1, J Cooney 0-1, J McGrath 0-1, Padraig Kelly 0-1 (sideline).		T Dunne 1-1, M Nolan 0-4 (1 sideline, 1f, 1 '70'), L Nolan 1-0, K Kennedy 1-0, P Shanahan 0-1.

Croke Park, Dublin
Attendance: 13,392
Referee: P Horan (Offaly)

Sarsfields	Toomevara
