= 1995 All-Ireland Under-21 Hurling Championship =

All-Ireland Under-21 Hurling Championship 1995
All Ireland Champions
- Winners: Tipperary (8th win)
- Captain: Brian Horgan
- Manager: Michael Doyle

All Ireland Runners-up
- Runners-up: Kilkenny
- Captain: Peter Barry
- Manager: Brendan O'Sullivan

Provincial Champions
- Munster: Tipperary
- Leinster: Kilkenny
- Ulster: Antrim
- Connacht: Not Played

Championship Statistics
- Top Scorer: Tommy Dunne (0-34)

The 1995 All-Ireland Under-21 Hurling Championship was the 32nd staging of the All-Ireland Under-21 Hurling Championship since its establishment by the Gaelic Athletic Association in 1964.

Kilkenny were the defending champions.

On 10 September 1995, Tipperary won the championship following a 1-14 to 1-10 defeat of Kilkenny in the All-Ireland final. This was their 8th All-Ireland title in the under-21 grade and their first in six championship seasons.

Tipperary's Tommy Dunne was the championship's top scorer with 0-34.

== Results ==
=== Leinster Under-21 Hurling Championship ===
Quarter-finals

14 June 1995 Quarter-final	Westmeath	1-07 - 4-19	Kilkenny	Castletown Geoghegan
	J Williams 1-0, F Shaw 0-3, P Galvin 0-1, P Williams 0-1, O Devine 0-1, A Moran 0-1.		B Ryan 3-2, O O'Connor 0-8, D Maher 1-3, B McEvoy 0-3, P Barry 0-1, T Dunphy 0-1, D Byrne 0-1.	Referee: C Byrne (Wicklow)

14 June 1995 Quarter-final	Wexford	1-18 - 1-05	Offaly	Nowlan Park, Kilkenny
	C Roche 1-2, P Codd 0-4, D Fitzhenry 0-4, T Kavanagh 0-3, R McCarthy 0-2, M Jordan 0-2, P Redmond 0-1.		D O'Meara 1-1, P McNally 0-1, D Miller 0-1, J Coakley 0-1, M O'Rourke 0-1.	Referee: P Neary (Kilkenny)

Semi-finals

5 July 1995 Semi-final	Wexford	1-17 - 1-09	Laois	Nowlan Park, Kilkenny
	D Fitzhenry 0-9, P Codd 1-2, R McCarthy 0-2, C Roche 0-2, M Jordan 0-2.		D Cuddy 1-6, P Cuddy 0-1, O Quinlan 0-1, L Tynan 0-1.	Referee: J Guinan (Kilkenny)

5 July 1995 Semi-final	Dublin	2-09 - 2-12	Kilkenny	O'Toole Park, Dublin
	K O'Donoghue 1-1, K Flynn 1-0, G Ennis 0-3, S Cooke 0-2, B O'Brien 0-2, S Perkins 0-1.		O O'Connor 1-6, D Byrne 0-4, N Moloney 1-0, J Costello 0-1, B Ryan 0-1.

Final

26 July 1995 Final	Kilkenny	2-11 - 1-12	Wexford	Dr. Cullen Park, Carlow
	O O'Connor 0-6, N Moloney 1-1, D Byrne 1-1, J Costello 0-2, D Maher 0-1.		P Codd 1-1, D Fitzhenry 0-3, D Laffan 0-3, P Redmond 0-2, R McCarthy 0-1, J Purcell 0-1, M Jordan 0-1.	Referee: S O'Meara (Offaly)

=== Munster Under-21 Hurling Championship ===
Quarter-finals

21 June 1995 Quarter-final	Clare	2-08 - 2-07	Waterford	Semple Stadium, Thurles
	F Flynn 1-1, B Murphy 1-1, E Taaffe 0-2, F Hegarty 0-1, D Scanlan 0-1, J Healy 0-1, O Baker 0-1.		P Flynn 0-4, D McGrath 1-0, B Walsh 1-0, B Ormonde 0-1, JJ Ronayne 0-1, F O'Shea 0-1.	Referee: W Barrett (Tipperary)

27 June 1995 Quarter-final	Limerick	2-03 - 2-17	Tipperary	Gaelic Grounds, Limerick
	JA Moran 2-1, P Cullinane 0-1, B Tobin 0-1.		Tommy Dunne 0-6, D O'Meara 1-1, A Flanagan 1-0, D Burke 0-3, A Molony 0-2, L McGrath 0-2, Terry Dunne 0-1, K Tucker 0-1, P Croke 0-1.

Semi-finals

12 July 1995 Semi-final	Tipperary	2-19 - 2-09	Cork	Semple Stadium, Thurles
	K Tucker 1-4, Tommy Dunne 0-6, D O'Meara 1-1, D Burke 0-4, A Moloney 0-3, E Enright 0-1.		A Browne 2-0, D O'Mahony 0-4, M Ryan 0-2, P Condon 0-2, D Ronan 0-1.	Referee: M Wadding (Waterford)

18 July 1995 Semi-final	Kerry	2-06 - 0-14	Clare	John Joe O'Sullivan Park, Ballyheigue
	J O'Carroll 2-0, O Diggins 0-4, A O'Sullivan 0-1, JJ Canty 0-1.		J Healy 0-9, D Forde 0-2, M Conlon 0-1, F Flynn 0-1, D Scanlon 0-1.	Referee: T Lehane (Limerick)

Final

26 July 1995 Final	Tipperary	1-17 - 0-14	Clare	Semple Stadium, Thurles
	Tommy Dunne 0-10, D Burke 1-0, E Enright 0-2, Terry Dunne 0-2, K Tucker 0-1, D O'Meara 0-1, P Croke 0-1.		J Healy 0-5, M Conlon 0-4, B Murphy 0-3, F Flynn 0-1, D Forde 0-1.	Referee: M Wadding (Waterford)

=== All-Ireland Under-21 Hurling Championship ===
Semi-finals

12 August 1995 Semi-final	Tipperary	4-12 - 1-08	Antrim	Páirc Tailteann, Navan
	D O'Connor 2-2, D Bourke 1-2, T Dunne 0-5, D O'Meara 1-1, K Tucker 0-2.		A McCloskey 0-5, A Mort 1-0, C McGuckian 0-1, K McGarry 0-1, C McMullen 0-1.	Referee: T Horan (Offaly)

19 August 1995 Semi-final	Kilkenny	3-07 - 1-13	Galway	Gaelic Grounds, Limerick
	B Ryan 1-2, D Buggy 1-1, D Byrne 1-0, O O'Connor 0-2, L Smith 0-1, J Costello 0-1.		F Forde 1-6, K Broderick 0-3, P Kelly 0-3, O Fahy 0-1.	Referee: T Murray (Limerick)

27 August 1995 Semi-final replay	Kilkenny	1-15 - 1-14	Galway	O'Connor Park, Tullamore
	D Cleere 0-6, L Smith 1-0, D Maher 0-3, D Buggy 0-2, B McEvoy 0-2, B Ryan 0-1, D Byrne 0-1.		F Forde 1-8, O Fahy 0-2, N Shaughnessy 0-2, G Glynn 0-1, C Moore 0-1.	Referee: T Murray (Limerick)

Final

10 September 1995 Final	Tipperary	1-14 - 1-10	Kilkenny	Semple Stadium, Thurles
	Tommy Dunne 0-7, P O'Dwyer 1-0, K Tucker 0-2, Terry Dunne 0-1, L McGrath 0-1, D o'Connor 0-1, D Bourke 0-1, A Butler 0-1.		D Cleere 0-7, B Ryan 1-2, L Smith 0-1.	Referee: T Murray (Limerick)

== Championship statistics ==
=== Top scorers ===
Overall

Rank	Player	Club	Tally	Total	Matches	Average
1	Tommy Dunne	Tipperary	0-34	34	5	6.80
2	Ollie O'Connor	Kilkenny	1-22	25	6	4.16
3	Brendan Ryan	Kilkenny	5-08	22	6	3.66
