= Lar Corbett =

Tipperary hurler (born 1981)

Personal information
- Native name: Labhras Ó Coirbín (Irish)
- Nickname: Larry
- Born: 16 March 1981 (age 45) Thurles, County Tipperary, Ireland
- Occupations: Publican; former electrician
- Height: 1.88 m (6 ft 2 in)

Sport
- Sport: Hurling
- Position: Left corner-forward
Club
- Years: Club
- 1998-2017: Thurles Sarsfields
Club titles
- Tipperary titles: 8
- Munster titles: 1
Inter-county*
Years	County	Apps (scores)
2000-2015	Tipperary	61 (29-80)
Inter-county titles
- Munster titles: 6
- All-Irelands: 2
- NHL: 2
- All Stars: 3
- *Inter County team apps and scores correct as of 18:00, 12 July 2015.

Laurence Corbett (born 16 March 1981) is an Irish former hurler who played for Tipperary Championship club Thurles Sarsfields. He played for the Tipperary senior hurling team for 15 years, during which time he usually lined out as a left corner-forward. Noted for his deadly accuracy in front of goal, Corbett is regarded as one of Tipperary's all-time greatest forwards.

Corbett began his hurling career at club level with Thurles Sarsfields. He broke onto the club's top adult team as a minor and enjoyed his first senior success in 2005 when Thurles Sarsfields won the Tipperary Senior Championship. Corbett won a further seven championship titles as well a Munster Club Championship in 2012.

At inter-county level, Corbett joined the Tipperary senior team in 2000, having earlier lined out with the Tipperary under-21 team. From his debut, he was ever-present as an inside forward and made a combined total of 119 National League and Championship appearances in a career that ended with his last game in 2015. During that time Corbett was part of two All-Ireland Championship-winning teams – in 2001 and 2010. He also secured six Munster Championship medals and two National Hurling League medals. Corbett announced his retirement from inter-county hurling on 18 November 2015.

Corbett won the first of three successive All-Stars in 2009 and made a clean sweep of the individual Hurler of the Year awards in 2010. He was Tipperary's record championship goal-scorer, having scored 29 goals in 61 appearances, but has been surpassed by Séamus Callanan in recent years. At inter-provincial level, Corbett was selected to play in three championship campaigns with Munster and won Railway Cup medals in 2007 and 2013.

== Playing career ==
=== Thurles Sarsfields ===
==== Minor and under-21 ====
Corbett joined the Thurles Sarsfields club at a young age and played in all grades at juvenile and underage levels. He enjoyed championship successes in the minor and under-21 grades before joining the club's senior team.

On 15 October 2000, Corbett was selected at right wing-forward when he lined out in his first Tipperary Senior Championship final. He scored a point from play but ended the game on the losing side after a 2–10 to 0–11 defeat by Toomevara.

Corbett lined out in a second successive final on 11 November 2001. He was held scoreless throughout the entire game and ended the game as a runner-up for the second year in-a-row after the 1–22 to 1–13 defeat by Toomevara.

For the third year in succession Thurles Sarsfields qualified for the final on 3 November 2002. Corbett scored three points from left corner-forward in the 0-14 apiece draw with Mullinahone. He was switched to centre-forward for the replay on 10 November 2002 but was held scoreless in the 2–10 to 1–11 defeat.

On 12 October 2003, Corbett played in a fifth final in four seasons when Thurles Sarsfields faced Toomevara for the third time. He top scored for Sarsfields with 2-01 from left corner-forward in the 3–19 to 3–16 defeat.

After a one-year hiatus, Corbett lined out in a sixth final on 16 October 2005 with Thurles Sarsfields facing Drom-Inch. He was held scoreless from left corner-forward but collected his first winners' medal after the 1–17 to 0–15 victory.

On 19 October 2008, Thurles Sarsfields faced Toomevara in the final once again. Corbett lined out at centre-forward and scored a point from play, however, he ended the game on the losing side after a 2–14 to 0–17 defeat.

Corbett played in a second successive final on 18 October 2009 when he lined out at full-forward against Drom-Inch. He was held scoreless throughout the game but collected a second winners' medal following the 0–14 to 0–05 victory.

On 31 October 2010, Corbett lined out in a third successive final. Playing once again at full-forward, he ended the game with a second successive winners' medal - his third overall - after the 1–16 to 1–07 defeat of Clonoulty-Rossmore. On 28 November 2010, Corbett lined out against De La Salle in the Munster final and scored a point in the 0–09 to 0–08 defeat.

On 14 October 2012, Corbett won a fourth championship medal after a 1–21 to 2–15 defeat of Drom-Inch in the final. On 25 November 2012, he won a Munster Club Championship medal after scoring three points in a 1–21 to 1–16 defeat of De La Salle in the Munster final.

Corbett lined out in his 11th final with Thurles Sarsfields on 2 November 2014. Playing centre-forward, he scored two points from play and collected a fifth winners' medal after a 2–22 to 3–11 victory over defending champions Loughmore-Castleiney.

On 25 October 2015, Corbett was selected at full-forward in a second consecutive final appearance with Nenagh Éire Óg providing the opposition. He ended the game with his sixth winners' medal after the 1–18 to 3–11 victory.

Corbett was selected at left corner-forward when Thurles Sarsfields faced Kiladangan in the final on 16 October 2016. He scored a point from play and claimed a seventh winners' medal overall after the 0–17 to 1–15 victory.

On 8 October 2017, Corbett lined out in his 14th final as the club reached a fourth successive decider. He claimed an eighth and final winners' medal after scoring two points from left corner-forward in the 1–24 to 0–11 defeat of Borris-Ileigh.

=== Inter-county ===
==== Early success ====
Corbett, having never played minor hurling for Tipperary, arrived on the inter-county scene in 2000 when he lined out against Clare in the South East League. He played no further part for the senior hurlers that year, however, he was included on the Tipperary under-21 team.

In 2001 Corbett became a regular member of the starting fifteen as Tipperary made it all the way to the league final. Clare provided the opposition and were left to rue five missed goal opportunities as Tipperary claimed a 1–19 to 0–17 victory. It was Corbett's first National Hurling League medal. He made his championship debut on 3 June 2001 in a narrow 0–15 to 0-14 Munster semi-final defeat of Clare. Corbett subsequently won his first Munster medal as Tipperary defeated Limerick by 2–16 to 1–17 to take their first provincial title in eight years. On 9 September 2001 Corbett lined out in his first All-Ireland decider as Tipperary faced Galway. The westerners put it up to Tipp, however, two goals by Mark O'Leary gave the Munster men the threshold to withstand a Galway comeback. With nine minutes to go Galway were only a point in arrears, however, Tipperary outscored Galway by five to three in those closing minutes. At the final whistle Tipperary were the winners by 2–18 to 2–15 with Corbett collecting his first All-Ireland medal.

==== Stagnant period ====
Tipperary surrendered their Munster crown to Waterford in 2002, before later exiting the championship with a defeat by Kilkenny at the semi-final stage. Corbett's season was hindered by hamstring injuries and he started just two of Tipperary's six championship games.

Tipperary's fortunes took a downturn over the next few years, with Corbett continuously suffering from injuries. He managed just a single seventy-minute championship stint under Michael Doyle in 2003, while he started just two championship games during Ken Hogan's tenure as manager, finishing neither.

==== Return to success ====
The appointment of Liam Sheedy as Tipperary's new manager saw Corbett take on a more prominent role as a goal-scoring forward. Tipperary remained undefeated during their 2008 league campaign and qualified for the decider against Galway. A Corbett goal proved decisive in the 3–18 to 3–16 victory. It was his second league medal. Corbett later collected a second Munster medal as Tipperary continued their winning streak with a 2–21 to 0–19 defeat of a resurgent Clare.

Tipperary retained their provincial crown in 2009, with Corbett collecting a third Munster medal following a 4–14 to 2–16 defeat of Waterford. On 6 September 2009 Tipperary faced four-in-a-row hopefuls Kilkenny in the All-Ireland decider. For long periods Tipperary looked the likely winners, however, late goals from Henry Shefflin and substitute Martin Comerford finally killed off their efforts to secure a 2–22 to 0–23 victory. In spite of this defeat Corbett was later presented with his first All-Star.

Three successive Munster titles proved beyond Tipperary, however, in spite of a shock defeat by Cork in the provincial quarter-final, Tipperary used the qualifiers to good effect and qualified for the All-Ireland decider on 5 September 2010. Kilkenny were the opponents once again as they sought a fifth successive All-Ireland crown title. "The Cats" lost talisman Henry Shefflin early in the game due to injury, while Corbett ran riot and scored a hat-trick of goals before Noel McGrath added a fourth. The 4–17 to 1–18 victory gave Corbett, who was named man of the match, his second All-Ireland medal. He later won a second successive All-Star while he also made a clean sweep of the three Hurler of the Year awards.

Tipperary reclaimed the provincial crown in 2011 following a huge 7–19 to 0-19 drubbing of Waterford in the decider. Corbett, who scored 4–4 in that game, collected his fourth Munster medal. Tipperary subsequently faced Kilkenny in a third successive All-Ireland decider on 4 September 2011. Goals by Michael Fennelly and Richie Hogan in either half gave Kilkenny, who many viewed as the underdogs going into the game, a 2–17 to 1–16 victory. Corbett was marked by Jackie Tyrell who held him scoreless throughout the game, however despite his lack of influence in the final, he later collected a third successive All-Star award.

==== Retirement and return ====
On 6 February 2012 Corbett announced that he was leaving the Tipperary team due to work commitments. He subsequently reversed his decision and rejoined the panel in time for the championship campaign. Tipperary won their fourth Munster crown in five years in 2012 as they easily retained the title. The 2–17 to 0–16 defeat of Waterford gave Corbett a fifth provincial winners' medal. In the subsequent All Ireland semi-final against Kilkenny, Corbett was assigned the role of man marking Kilkenny defender Tommy Walsh around the pitch, with Kilkenny assigning Jackie Tyrrell to mark Corbett. The marking battle between the players developed into a sideshow and nullified Corbett's own game as he remained scoreless during the game which Kilkenny won by 4–24 to 1–15. Various analysts and reporters heavily criticised the tactic after the game.

After a poor start to their 2014 championship campaign, Tipperary reached the All-Ireland final on 7 September 2014. Corbett started the game at left corner-forward in what some consider to be the greatest game of all time. John O'Dwyer had the chance to win the game, however, his late free drifted wide resulting in a draw. The replay on 27 September 2014 was also a close affair. Goals from brothers Richie and John Power inspired Kilkenny to a 2–17 to 2–14 victory.

A knee injury ruled Corbett out of much of Tipperary's league campaign, however, he returned to training on 15 April 2015. He later won a sixth Munster medal when he was introduced as a substitute in Tipperary's 0–21 to 0-16 provincial decider defeat of Waterford.

On 18 November 2015, Corbett announced his retirement from inter-county hurling.

=== Inter-provincial ===
In 2007 Corbett was first picked for the Munster inter-provincial team. He was at left corner-forward that year when he won his first Railway Cup medal following a 2–22 to 2–19 defeat of Connacht.

After playing for Munster again in 2008 Corbett was absent from the team until 2013 when he was included on the starting fifteen for the final against Connacht. The game faded out in the final quarter, however, Munster claimed a comprehensive 1–22 to 0–15 victory, with Corbett collecting a second winners' medal.

== Personal life ==
Born in Thurles, County Tipperary, Corbett was educated at the local national school and later attended Thurles CBS. After completing his Leaving Cert he qualified as an electrician. The economic downturn led to unemployment for Corbett after ten years as an electrician with the same company. In 2011 he opened his own pub in Thurles.

On 15 December 2012 Corbett married long-term girlfriend Elaine Gleeson.

== Career statistics ==
Team	Year	National League			Munster		All-Ireland		Total	
Team	Year	Division	Apps	Score	Apps	Score	Apps	Score	Apps	Score
Tipperary	2001	Division 1B	7	4-11	2	1-02	3	0-03	12	5-16
Tipperary	2002	Division 1B	4	1-06	2	0-01	2	0-02	8	1-09
Tipperary	2003	Division 1B	9	9-13	1	0-00	4	0-06	14	9-19
Tipperary	2004	Division 1B	5	2-01	0	0-00	2	0-00	7	2-01
Tipperary	2005	Division 1B	1	1-01	3	1-03	0	0-00	4	2-04
Tipperary	2006	Division 1B	0	0-00	2	2-01	1	0-02	3	2-03
Tipperary	2007	Division 1B	5	0-07	3	0-05	4	3-06	12	3-18
Tipperary	2008	Division 1B	7	5-09	2	0-06	1	0-01	10	5-16
Tipperary	2009	Division 1	5	1-06	3	3-06	2	3-05	10	7-17
Tipperary	2010	Division 1	5	0-11	1	0-02	5	6-12	11	6-25
Tipperary	2011	Division 1	3	0-04	3	6-06	2	1-03	10	7-13
Tipperary	2012	Division 1A	0	0-00	2	0-00	1	0-00	3	0-00
Tipperary	2013	Division 1A	7	3-07	1	0-00	1	1-00	9	4-07
Tipperary	2014	Division 1A	0	0-00	1	0-01	5	2-08	6	2-09
Tipperary	2015	Division 1A	0	0-00	1	0-01	1	0-00	2	0-00
Total			58	26-76	27	13-34	34	16-48	119	55-158

== Honours ==
=== Team ===
Thurles Sarsfields

- Munster Senior Club Hurling Championship (1): 2012
- Tipperary Senior Hurling Championship (8): 2005, 2009, 2010, 2012, 2014, 2015, 2016, 2017
- Tipperary Under-21 Hurling Championship (1): 2002
- Tipperary Minor Hurling Championship (1): 1999

Tipperary

- All-Ireland Senior Hurling Championship (2): 2001, 2010
- Munster Senior Hurling Championship (6): 2001, 2008, 2009, 2011, 2012, 2015
- National Hurling League (2): 2001, 2008

Munster

- Railway Cup (2): 2007, 2013

=== Individual ===
Awards

- Texaco Hurler of the Year (1): 2010
- All Stars Hurler of the Year (1): 2010
- GPA Hurler of the Year (1): 2010
- All Stars (3): 2009, 2010, 2011
- All-Ireland Hurling Final Man of the Match (1): 2010

Sporting positions
Preceded by Ger O'Grady	Tipperary Senior Hurling Captain; 2006	Succeeded by Benny Dunne
Awards
Preceded by P. J. Ryan (Kilkenny)	All-Ireland Senior Hurling Final; Man of the Match; 2010	Succeeded by J. J. Delaney
Preceded by Tommy Walsh (Kilkenny)	Vodafone Hurler of the Year; 2010	Succeeded by Michael Fennelly
Preceded by Tommy Walsh (Kilkenny)	Gaelic Players' Association; Hurler of the Year; 2010	Succeeded by Michael Fennelly
Preceded by Tommy Walsh (Kilkenny)	Texaco Hurler of the Year; 2010	Succeeded by Michael Fennelly
