= Ronan Maher (hurler) =

Tipperary hurler (born 1995)

Personal information
- Native name: Rónán Ó Meachair (Irish)
- Born: 9 October 1995 (age 31) Thurles, County Tipperary, Ireland
- Occupation: Garda
- Height: 1.88 m (6 ft 2 in)

Sport
- Sport: Hurling
- Position: Centre-back
Club
- Years: Club
- 2012–: Thurles Sarsfields
Club titles
- Tipperary titles: 6
- Munster titles: 1
College
- Years: College
- 2012–2017: Mary Immaculate College
College titles
- Fitzgibbon titles: 2
Inter-county*
Years	County	Apps (scores)
2014–	Tipperary	58 (0–35)
Inter-county titles
- Munster titles: 2
- All-Irelands: 3
- NHL: 0
- All Stars: 3
- *Inter County team apps and scores correct as of match played 24 May 2026.

Ronan Maher (born 9 October 1995) is an Irish hurler who plays for Tipperary Senior Championship club Thurles Sarsfields and at inter-county level with the Tipperary senior hurling team. He usually lines out as a centre-back.

== Playing career ==
=== Thurles CBS ===
Maher first came to prominence as a hurler with Thurles CBS. He played in every grade before eventually joining the college's senior team and lined out in several Harty Cup campaigns.

=== Mary Immaculate College ===
During his studies at Mary Immaculate College, Maher was selected for the college's senior hurling team during his second year. On 27 February 2016, he lined out at right wing-back when Mary Immaculate College faced the University of Limerick in the Fitzgibbon Cup final. Maher ended the game with a winners' medal following the 1–30 to 3–22 victory.

On 25 February 2017, Maher again lined out at centre-back when Mary Immaculate College qualified for a second successive Fitzgibbon Cup final. He scored four points, including three from frees, and claimed a second successive winners' medal after a 3–24 to 1–19 defeat of the Carlow Institute of Technology.

=== Thurles Sarsfields ===
Maher joined the Thurles Sarsfields club at a young age and played in all grades at juvenile and underage levels. He won four Tipperary Under-21 Championship medals with the club between 2012 and 2016. Maher was added to the Thurles Sarsfields senior team for the 2012 Tipperary Senior Championship.

On 14 October 2012, Maher was a non-playing substitute when Thurles Sarsfields faced Drom-Inch in the final. He remained on the bench for the entire game but ended with a winners' medal following a 1–21 to 2–15 victory. On 25 November 2012, Maher won a Munster Championship medal when he came on as an injury-time substitute in the 1–21 to 1–16 defeat of De La Salle.

After surrendering their titles in 2013, Maher lined out in a second final on 2 November 2014. He claimed a second winners' medal, his first on the field of play, when he lined out at right wing-back following Thurles Sarsfields 2–22 to 3–11 defeat of reigning champions Loughmore-Castleiney.

On 25 October 2015, Maher was at left wing-back when Thurles Sarsfields faced Nenagh Éire Óg in the Tipperary Senior Championship final. He ended the game with a third winners' medal following the 1–18 to 3–11 victory.

Maher lined out at left wing-back when Thurles Sarsfields faced Kiladangan in the Tipperary Senior Championship final. He ended the game as man of the match in the 0–27 to 1–15 victory.

On 8 October 2017, Maher lined out at right wing-back in a fourth successive final. He scored a point from play and ended the game with a fifth winners' medal following the 1–24 to 0–11 defeat of Borris-Ileigh.

In July 2022, in the first round of the 2022 Tipperary Senior Hurling Championship against Borris-Ileigh, Maher broke a bone in his leg and was ruled out for the rest of the championship.

=== Tipperary ===
==== Minor and under-21 ====
Maher was just 16-years-old when he was selected for the Tipperary minor hurling team in advance of the 2012 Munster Championship. He made his first appearance for the team on 2 May 2012 when he lined out at right wing-back in a 6–21 to 0–11 defeat of Kerry. On 15 July 2012, Ronan won a Munster Championship medal when he lined out at left corner-back in a 1–16 to 1–12 defeat of Clare in the final. He was switched to right corner-back when Tipperary drew 2–13 to 1–16 with Dublin in the All-Ireland final. Maher was again at right corner-forward for the replay on 30 September 2012. He ended the game with an All-Ireland medal following the 2–18 to 1–11 victory.

Maher was switched to centre-back for the 2013 Munster Championship. He played his last game on the grade on 26 June 2013 in a 1–17 to 0–17 defeat by Limerick on 26 June 2013.

Maher joined the Tipperary under-21 hurling panel in advance of the 2014 Munster Championship. He made his first appearance for the team on 16 July 2014 when he lined out at right wing-back in a 5–19 to 1–25 defeat by Clare.

After a disappointing 2015 Munster Championship, Maher was selected for the under-21 team for a third successive season in 2016. On 27 July, he lined out at right wing-back in a 2–19 to 0–15 defeat by Waterford in the Munster final.

==== Senior ====
On 12 January 2014, Maher made his competitive debut for the Tipperary senior team in a 3–20 to 0–05 defeat of the Limerick Institute of Technology in the Waterford Crystal Cup. He claimed a winners' medal in that competition on 7 February 2014, as Tipperary defeated Clare by 4–22 to 3–11 in the decider. Maher made his National League debut on 15 February 2014 when he came on as a 59th-minute substitute for James Woodlock in a 2–13 to 0–16 defeat of Waterford. On 4 May 2014, he was an unused substitute when Tipperary suffered a 2–25 to 1–27 defeat by Kilkenny in the National League final.

On 12 July 2015, Maher was selected at left wing-back when Tipperary faced Waterford in the Munster final. He ended the game with a winners' medal following the 0–21 to 0–16 victory.

Maher claimed a second successive Munster Championship medal on 10 July 2016 after lining out at centre-back in a 5–19 to 0–13 defeat of Waterford in the final. On 5 September 2016, he again lined out at centre-back for Tipperary's All-Ireland final meeting with Kilkenny. Maher ended the game with an All-Ireland medal following a 2–29 to 2–20 victory. He ended the season by winning an All-Star award.

On 23 April 2017, Maher lined out at centre-back in his first National League final. He ended the game on the losing side after scoring two points in the 3–21 to 0–14 defeat by Galway.

Maher played in a second consecutive National League final on 8 April 2018. Lining out at centre-back, he ended the game on the losing side following a 2–23 to 2–17 defeat by Kilkenny.

On 30 June 2019, Maher lined out at left wing-back and scored two points from play when Tipperary suffered a 2–26 to 2–14 defeat by Limerick in the Munster final. On 18 August 2019, he was selected at full-back when Tipperary faced Kilkenny in the All-Ireland final. Maher ended the game with a second All-Ireland winners' medal following the 3–25 to 0–20 victory. He ended the season by being named in the full-back position on the All-Star team.

In February 2022, Maher was named as the new captain of the Tipperary team.

In January 2024, Maher was named as the captain of the Tipperary team for the second time. In January 2025, Maher was again named as captain for the year, and subsequently captained Tipperary to victory in that year's All Ireland Hurling final against Cork, the county's first title since 2019. On 21 July 2025, Maher was added to the Thurles Sarsfields wall of winners mural outside Semple Stadium for players who have captained Tipperary to All-Ireland Senior hurling titles.

In lifting the Liam MacCarthy Cup, Maher became the first serving member of the Garda Síochána to captain an All-Ireland-winning hurling team since Mick Gill 98 years earlier.

== Career statistics ==
As of match played 24 May 2026

Team	Year	National League			Munster		All-Ireland		Total	
Team	Year	Division	Apps	Score	Apps	Score	Apps	Score	Apps	Score
Tipperary	2014	Division 1A	5	0–1	0	0–0	1	0–0	6	0–1
Tipperary	2015	Division 1A	7	0–3	2	0–0	1	0–0	10	0–3
Tipperary	2016	Division 1A	5	0–1	3	0–0	2	0–1	10	0–2
Tipperary	2017	Division 1A	7	0–4	1	0–0	4	0–1	12	0–5
Tipperary	2018	Division 1A	8	0–14	4	0–4	—		12	0–18
Tipperary	2019	Division 1A	6	0–2	5	0–5	3	0–4	14	0–11
Tipperary	2020	Division 1A	5	0–5	1	0–0	2	0–1	8	0–6
Tipperary	2021	Division 1A	4	0–9	2	0–2	1	0–3	7	0–14
Tipperary	2022	Division 1A	4	0–6	4	0–3	—		8	0–9
Tipperary	2023	Division 1A	6	0–3	4	0–2	2	0–1	12	0–6
Tipperary	2024	Division 1A	5	0–0	4	0–5	—		9	0–5
Tipperary	2025	Division 1A	6	0-05	4	0-00	4	0-00	14	0-05
Tipperary	2026	Division 1A			4	0-03			4	0-03
Total			68	0–53	38	0–24	20	0–11	126	0–88

== Honours ==
Mary Immaculate College

- Fitzgibbon Cup (2): 2016, 2017

Thurles Sarsfields

- Munster Senior Club Hurling Championship (1): 2012
- Tipperary Senior Hurling Championship (6): 2012, 2014, 2015, 2016, 2017, 2026
- Tipperary Under-21 Hurling Championship (4): 2012, 2013, 2015, 2016

Tipperary

- All-Ireland Senior Hurling Championship (3): 2016, 2019, 2025 (c)
- Munster Senior Hurling Championship (2): 2015, 2016
- Waterford Crystal Cup (1): 2014
- All-Ireland Minor Hurling Championship (1): 2012
- Munster Minor Hurling Championship (1): 2012

Individual

- All Star Award (3): 2016, 2019, 2025
- The Sunday Game Team of the Year (3): 2016, 2019, 2025
- All-Ireland Senior Hurling Championship Final Man of the Match (1): 2025

Sporting positions
Preceded by Bill Maher	Tipperary Under-21 Hurling Captain; 2016	Succeeded by Andrew Coffey
Preceded by Séamus Callanan	Tipperary Senior Hurling Captain; 2022	Succeeded by Incumbent
