= Pádraic Maher =

Tipperary hurler (born 1989)

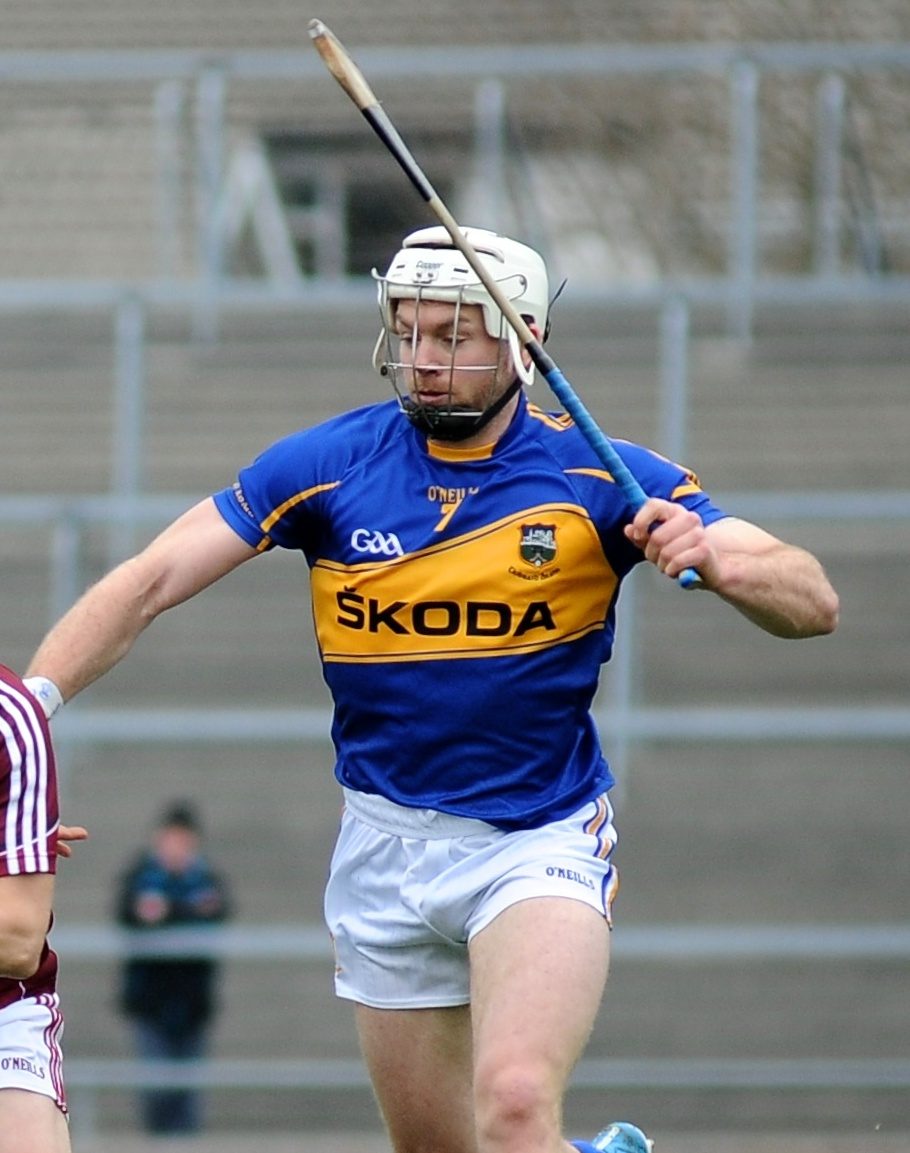
- Maher with Tipperary in 2015

Personal information
- Native name: Pádraic Ó Meachair (Irish)
- Nickname: Paudie
- Born: 9 February 1989 (age 37) Thurles, County Tipperary, Ireland
- Occupation: Garda
- Height: 1.85 m (6 ft 1 in)

Sport
- Sport: Hurling
- Position: Centre-back
Club
- Years: Club
- 2006-2022: Thurles Sarsfields
Club titles
- Tipperary titles: 7
- Munster titles: 1
College
- Years: College
- 2016-2017: Garda Síochána College
College titles
- Fitzgibbon titles: 0
Inter-county*
Years	County	Apps (scores)
2009–2022	Tipperary	60 (0-20)
Inter-county titles
- Munster titles: 5
- All-Irelands: 3
- NHL: 0
- All Stars: 6
- *Inter County team apps and scores correct as of 16:30, 31 July 2021.

Pádraic Maher (born 9 February 1989) is an Irish former hurler who previously played for Tipperary Senior Championship club Thurles Sarsfields and at inter-county level with the Tipperary senior hurling team. He usually lined out as a centre-back.

== Playing career ==
=== Thurles CBS ===
Maher first came to prominence as a hurler with Thurles CBS. He played in every grade before eventually joining the senior hurling team as a 15-year-old. On 12 March 2005, Maher lined out at full-back when Thurles CBS suffered a 1–11 to 1–06 defeat by St. Flannan's College from Ennis in the Harty Cup final.

=== Garda College ===
As a student at the Garda Síochána College in Templemore, Maher immediately became involved with the college's senior hurling team. On 25 February 2017, he won a Ryan Cup medal after lining out in a 5–23 to 1–8 defeat of the Institute of Technology, Sligo in the final.

=== Thurles Sarsfields ===
Maher joined the Thurles Sarsfield's club at a young age and played in all grades at juvenile and underage levels and enjoyed much success. He won back-to-back Minor Championship medals in 2006 and 2007 before claiming back-to-back Under-21 Championship medals in 2008 and 2009. Maher was just 17-years-old when he made his first appearance for the club's senior team during the 2006 Tipperary Senior Championship.

On 19 October 2008, Maher lined out at full-back against Toomevara in his first Tipperary Senior Championship final. He ended the game on the losing side following a 2–14 to 0–17 defeat.

Maher played in a second successive final on 18 October 2009 when he lined out at full-back against Drom-Inch. The game ended on a sour note when Drom-Inch midfielder James Woodlock was stretchered off the field with a suspected fractured ankle after a clash with Maher. "James clashed with my leg – it was a horrific injury," said Maher after collecting his first winners' medal following a 0–14 to 0–05 victory.

On 31 October 2010, Maher lined out in a third successive final. Playing once again at full-back, he ended the game with a second successive winners' medal while he also claimed the man of the match award after a 1–16 to 1–07 defeat of Clonoulty-Rossmore.

Maher was appointed captain of the team for the 2012 Tipperary Senior Championship. On 14 October 2012, he captained the team from centre-back when Thurles Sarsfields faced Drom-Inch in the final. Maher claimed a third winners' medal in four seasons after a 1–21 to 2–15 victory. On 25 November 2012, he captained Thurles Sarsfields to their very first Munster Club Championship title after a 1–21 to 1–16 defeat of De La Salle in the Munster final.

On 2 November 2014, Maher lined out in his fifth final with Thurles Sarsfields. Playing in his now usual position of centre-back, he collected a fourth winners' medal after a 2–22 to 3–11 victory over defending champions Loughmore-Castleiney.

Maher was appointed Thurles Sarsfields captain for the second time in his career for the 2015 Tipperary Senior Championship. On 25 October 2015, he captained the team from centre-back in a second consecutive final appearance with Nenagh Éire Óg providing the opposition. Maher ended the game with a fifth winners' medal after the 1–18 to 3–11 victory.

Maher retained the club captaincy for the 2016 Tipperary Senior Championship. On 16 October 2016, he claimed his sixth winners' medal when Thurles Sarsfields completed their first three-in-a-row since 1965 after a 0–27 to 1–15 defeat of Kiladangan in the final.

On 8 October 2017, Maher captained Thurles Sarsfields for the third year in-a-row as the club reached a fourth successive final. He won his seventh championship medal after scoring a point from centre-back in the 1–24 to 0–11 defeat of Borris-Ileigh.

=== Tipperary ===
==== Minor and under-21 ====
Maher first played for Tipperary as a member of the minor team during the 2006 Munster Championship. On 25 June 2006, he was an unused substitute when Tipperary suffered a 2–20 to 1–15 defeat by Cork in the Munster final. Maher made his first appearance for the team on 15 July 2006 when he lined out at full-back in Tipperary's 4–19 to 0–12 defeat of Carlow in the All-Ireland quarter-final. Maher retained his position on the starting fifteen when Tipperary faced Galway in the All-Ireland final on 3 September 2006. He ended the game with a winners' medal following the 2–18 to 2–07 victory.

On 8 July 2007, Maher was at full-back when Tipperary won the Munster Championship following an 0–18 to 1–11 defeat of Cork in the final. On 2 September 2007, he was again at full-back for the All-Ireland final against Cork. He claimed a second successive winners' medal following a 3–14 to 2–11 victory.

Maher was drafted onto the Tipperary under-21 team in advance of the 2008 Munster Championship. He made his first appearance for the team on 17 July 2008 when he lined out at full-back in a 1–13 to 0–15 defeat of Limerick. On 30 July 2008, Maher won a Munster Championship medal after a controversial 1–16 to 2–12 defeat of Clare. He retained his position at full-back when Tipperary suffered a 2–13 to 0–15 defeat by Kilkenny in the All-Ireland final on 14 September 2008.

On 28 July 2010, Maher won a second Munster Championship medal after captaining Tipperary to a 1–22 to 1–17 defeat of Clare in the final. He was again selected at full-back for the All-Ireland final against Galway on 11 September 2010. Maher ended the game with an All-Ireland medal following the 5–22 to 0–12 victory in what was his last game in the grade.

==== Senior ====
Maher joined the Tipperary senior team in advance of the 2009 National League. He made his first appearance for the team on 29 March 2009 when he came on as a substitute for Shane Maher at left wing-back in a 2–19 to 4–11 defeat of Dublin. On 3 May 2009, Maher lined out at right wing-back in a 2–26 to 4-17 extra-time defeat by Kilkenny in the National League final. On 31 May 2009, he made his Munster Championship debut when he lined out at left wing-back in a 1–19 to 0–19 defeat of Cork. On 12 July 2009, Maher started the Munster final at left wing-back and ended the game with a winners' medal following the 4–14 to 2–16 defeat of Waterford. He was switched to full-back for the All-Ireland final against Kilkenny on 6 September 2009. Maher ended on the losing side following a 2–22 to 0–23 defeat. He ended the season by being named in the full-back position on the All-Star team.

On 5 September 2010, Maher was selected at left wing-back when Tipperary qualified to play Kilkenny in a second successive All-Ireland final. He claimed his first All-Ireland medal following a 4–17 to 1–18 victory.

On 10 July 2011, Maher won a second Munster Championship medal after lining out at left wing-back in a 7–19 to 0–19 defeat of Waterford in the Munster final. On 4 September 2011, he was again selected at left wing-back when Tipperary faced Kilkenny in a third successive All-Ireland final. He ended the game on the losing side following a 2–17 to 1–16 defeat. Maher ended the season by winning a second All-Star award while he was also a nominee for Hurler of the Year.

On 15 July 2012, Maher lined out at left wing-back when Tipperary qualified to play Waterford in a second successive Munster final. He ended the game with a third winners' medal in four seasons after scoring a point in the 2–17 to 0–16 victory.

On 5 May 2013, Maher was selected at centre-back when Tipperary faced Kilkenny in the National League final. He scored a point from play but ended the game on the losing side following a 2–17 to 0–20 defeat.

On 4 May 2014, Maher lined out at full-back in a second successive National League final against Kilkenny. He ended the game on the losing side once again following a 2–25 to 1–27 defeat. On 7 September 2014, Maher was again at full-back when Tipperary drew 1–28 to 3–22 with Kilkenny in the All-Ireland final. He retained his position for the replay on 27 September 2014, however, he ended the game on the losing side after a 2–17 to 2–14 defeat. Maher ended the season by receiving a third All-Star award.

On 12 July 2015, Maher was selected at centre-back when Tipperary faced Waterford in the Munster final. He ended the game with a fourth winners' medal following the 0–21 to 0–16 victory.

Maher claimed a fifth Munster Championship medal on 10 July 2016 after scoring a point from left wing-back in a 5–19 to 0–13 defeat of Waterford in the final. On 5 September 2016, he lined out at left wing-back for Tipperary's All-Ireland final meeting with Kilkenny. Maher ended the game with a second All-Ireland medal following a 2–29 to 2–20 victory. He ended the season by winning a fourth All-Star award while he also received a second nomination for Hurler of the Year.

On 28 November 2016, Maher was named as the captain of the Tipperary team for the 2017 season. On 23 April 2017, he lined out in his fourth National League final. Maher ended the game on the losing side following a 3–21 to 0–14 victory for Galway. He ended the season by winning a fifth All-Star award.

Maher retained the captaincy of the team for the 2018 season. He captained the team in a second successive National League final - his fifth overall - on 8 April 2018. Lining out at left wing-back, Maher ended the game on the losing side following a 2–23 to 2–17 defeat by Kilkenny.

On 30 June 2019, Maher lined out at centre-back when Tipperary suffered a 2–26 to 2–14 defeat by Limerick in the Munster final. On 18 August 2019, he was selected at left wing-back when Tipperary faced Kilkenny in the All-Ireland final. Maher ended the game with a third All-Ireland winners' medal following the 3–25 to 0–20 victory. He ended the season by receiving his sixth All-Star award.

On 1 February 2022, Maher announced his retirement from club and inter-county hurling due to medical advice received regarding a neck injury.

=== Munster ===
Maher was added to the Munster team in advance of the 2012 Railway Cup. He made his first appearance for the team on 19 February 2012 when he lined out at centre-back in a 3–14 to 1–16 defeat by Leinster.

On 15 December 2016, Maher lined out at left wing-back when Munster qualified to play Leinster in the final. He ended the game with a Railway Cup medal following the 2–20 to 2–16 victory.

== Management and coaching career ==
=== Tipperary ===
On 23 July 2022, Maher was named by new Tipperary senior hurling manager Liam Cahill as part of his backroom team for 2023. In September 2023, Maher left his position as a selector with the Tipperary senior hurling team due to unforeseen changes in his work circumstances.

== Personal life ==
Maher's memoir, All on the Line, was published in October 2022. In January 2025, Maher was featured on the new series of Laochra Gael.

== Career statistics ==
As of match played 31 July 2021

Team	Year	National League			Munster		All-Ireland		Total	
Team	Year	Division	Apps	Score	Apps	Score	Apps	Score	Apps	Score
Tipperary	2009	Division 1	4	0-00	3	0-00	2	0-00	9	0-00
Tipperary	2010	Division 1	7	0-01	1	0-00	5	0-00	13	0-01
Tipperary	2011	Division 1	4	0-01	3	0-02	2	0-02	9	0-05
Tipperary	2012	Division 1A	6	0-03	3	0-02	1	0-00	10	0-05
Tipperary	2013	Division 1A	7	0-02	1	0-00	1	0-00	9	0-02
Tipperary	2014	Division 1A	5	0-00	1	0-00	6	0-00	12	0-00
Tipperary	2015	Division 1A	7	0-02	2	0-00	1	0-00	10	0-02
Tipperary	2016	Division 1A	6	0-05	3	0-03	2	0-02	11	0-10
Tipperary	2017	Division 1A	8	0-06	1	0-01	4	0-03	13	0-10
Tipperary	2018	Division 1A	7	0-03	4	0-01	—		11	0-04
Tipperary	2019	Division 1A	6	0-01	5	0-03	3	0-01	14	0-05
Tipperary	2020	Division 1A	4	0-06	1	0-00	2	0-00	7	0-06
Tipperary	2021	Division 1A	5	0-00	2	0-00	1	0-00	8	0-00
Career total			76	0-30	30	0-12	30	0-08	136	0-50

== Honours ==
=== Player ===
Garda Síochána College

- Ryan Cup (1): 2017

Thurles Sarsfields

- Munster Senior Club Hurling Championship (1): 2012 (c)
- Tipperary Senior Hurling Championship (7): 2009, 2010, 2012 (c), 2014, 2015 (c), 2016 (c), 2017 (c)

Tipperary

- All-Ireland Senior Hurling Championship (3): 2010, 2016, 2019
- Munster Senior Hurling Championship (5): 2009, 2011, 2012, 2015, 2016
- All-Ireland Under-21 Hurling Championship (1): 2010 (c)
- Munster Under-21 Hurling Championship (2): 2008, 2010 (c)
- All-Ireland Minor Hurling Championship (2): 2006, 2007
- Munster Minor Hurling Championship (1): 2007
- Waterford Crystal Cup (2): 2012, 2014

Munster

- Railway Cup (1): 2016

Awards

- All-Stars (6): 2009, 2011, 2014, 2016, 2017, 2019
- The Sunday Game Team of the Year (4): 2014, 2016, 2017, 2019

=== Management ===
Thurles Sarsfields

- Tipperary Senior Hurling Championship (1): 2026

Sporting positions
Preceded by Pa Bourke	Tipperary Under-21 Hurling Captain; 2010	Succeeded by Noel McGrath
Preceded by Brendan Maher	Tipperary Senior Hurling Captain; 2017-2018	Succeeded by Séamus Callanan
Achievements
Preceded by Ciarán O'Doherty	All-Ireland Under-21 Hurling Final winning captain 2010	Succeeded by Barry Daly
