= Stephen Maher (hurler) =

Irish hurler

Personal information
- Native name: Stiofán Ó Meachair (Irish)
- Nickname: Picky
- Born: 17 January 1993 (age 33) Portlaoise, County Laois, Ireland
- Occupation: Prison officer
- Height: 1.85 m (6 ft 1 in)

Sport
- Sport: Hurling
- Position: Centre-forward
Club
- Years: Club
- 2010–present: Clough–Ballacolla
Club titles
- Laois titles: 7
College
- Years: College
- Institute of Technology, Carlow
College titles
- Fitzgibbon titles: 0
Inter-county*
Years	County	Apps (scores)
2012–present	Laois	53 (5-205)
Inter-county titles
- Leinster titles: 0
- All-Irelands: 0
- NHL: 0
- All Stars: 0
- *Inter County team apps and scores correct as of 21:24, 10 June 2026.

Stephen Maher (born 17 January 1993) is an Irish hurler. At club level he played with plays with Clough–Ballacolla ad at inter-county level with the Laois senior hurling team.

== Career ==
Maher attended St Fergal's College in Rathdowney and played in all grades of hurling during his time there. He later studied at the Institute of Technology, Carlow. Maher was top scorer with 1–13 in IT Carlow's 3–24 to 1–19 defeat by Mary Immaculate College in the Fitzgibbon Cup final in February 2017. He was later named on the Rising Stars Team.

At club level, Maher first played for Clough–Ballacolla at juvenile and underage levels, before progressing to the club's senior team. He won his first Laois SHC medal in 2011, after beating Portlaoise by two points in the final. He claimed a second Laois SHC title in 2015. Maher claimed further Laois SHC honours when he captained Clough–Ballacolla to three consecutive titles between 2020 and 2022. He brought his Laois SHC medal tally to seven after victories in 2024 and 2025.

At inter-county level, Maher first played for Laois during a two-year tenure with the minor team in 2010 and 2011. He later spent three consecutive years with the under-21 team. Maher made his senior team debut in a National Hurling League game against Limerick in March 2012.

Maher claimed his first silverware with Laois in 2013, when Laois beat Westmeath to win the National Hurling League Division 2 title. He won a Joe McDonagh Cup medal in June 2019, following Laois's 3–26 to 1–21 win over Westmeath in the final. Maher won further NHL Division 2 medals in 2024 and 2026 He lined out at centre-forward when Laois beat Carlow by 1–27 to 1–18 to win a second Joe McDonagh Cup title in June 2026.

== Career statistics ==
As of 6 June 2026

Team	Year	National League			McDonagh Cup		Leinster		All-Ireland		Total	
Team	Year	Division	Apps	Score	Apps	Score	Apps	Score	Apps	Score	Apps	Score
Laois	2012	Division 1B	2	0-01	—		2	0-03	1	0-01	5	0-05
Laois	2013	Division 2A	6	1-35	—		3	0-15	1	0-05	10	1-55
Laois	2014	Division 1B	6	1-28	—		5	1-34	1	0-02	12	2-64
Laois	2015	Division 1B	2	0-00	—		4	1-05	1	0-01	7	1-06
Laois	2016	Division 1B	7	1-08	—		1	0-02	0	0-00	8	1-10
Laois	2017	Division 1B	3	0-26	—		4	0-06	1	0-03	8	0-35
Laois	2018	Division 1B	0	0-00	5	0-12	—		—		5	0-12
Laois	2019	Division 1B	6	1-01	3	0-13	—		1	0-00	10	1-14
Laois	2020	Division 1B	0	0-00	—		1	0-02	1	0-00	2	0-02
Laois	2021	Division 1B	2	0-03	—		1	0-00	1	0-00	4	0-03
Laois	2022	Division 1B	4	0-27	—		1	0-00	—		5	0-27
Laois	2023	Division 1B	6	0-43	5	2-50	—		—		11	2-93
Laois	2024	Division 2A	4	0-23	4	0-11	—		1	0-02	9	0-36
Laois	2025	Division 1B	0	0-00	0	0-00	—		0	0-00	0	0-00
Laois	2026	Division 2	2	0-04	5	1-38	—		—		7	1-42
Total			50	4-199	22	3-124	22	2-67	9	0-14	103	9-404

== Honours ==
Clough–Ballacolla

- Laois Senior Hurling Championship (7): 2011, 2015, 2020 (c), 2021 (c), 2022 (c), 2024, 2025

Laois

- Joe McDonagh Cup (2): 2019, 2026
- National Hurling League Division 2 (3): 2013, 2024, 2026
