= 2017 Fitzgibbon Cup =

Irish collegiate hurling tournament

Tournament details
- Year: 2017
- Trophy: Fitzgibbon Cup
- Sponsor: independent.ie

Winners
- Champions: Mary I
- Manager: Jamie Wall
- Captain: Eoin Quirke

Runners-up
- Runners-up: IT Carlow
- Manager: D. J. Carey

Other
- Player of the Year: Cian Lynch

The 2017 independent.ie Fitzgibbon Cup was the 101st staging of the Fitzgibbon Cup since its establishment in 1912. The semi-finals and final were hosted by NUI Galway on 24 and 25 February 2017. Mary I retained the title after a 3–24 to 1–19 win against IT Carlow in the final.

== Format ==
Group stage

Sixteen institutes of higher education compete in groups of four. Each team in a group plays all the other teams in the group once. Two points are awarded for a win and one for a draw.

Knockout stage

The four group winners play the four group runners-up in the quarter-finals. The semi-finals and final are played over a single weekend, usually the last Friday and Saturday in February.

== Group stage ==
=== Group A ===
Pos	Team	Pld	W	D	L	SF	SA	Diff	Pts
1	Mary I Limerick	3	2	1	0	7-77	1-42	53	5
2	IT Carlow	3	2	1	0	10-56	1-44	39	5
3	DIT	3	1	0	2	5-38	9-57	-31	2
4	GMIT	3	0	0	3	0-38	11-66	-61	0

24 January 2017; 14:00; Round 1	Mary I Limerick	2-31 - 0-16	GMIT	MICL Grounds; Referee: Mick Murtagh
24 January 2017; 14:00; Round 1	D O'Donovan (0-8, 0-1 free, 0-1 sideline); C Lynch, T Grimes (1-2); A Gillane (0-5, 0-1 free); T Monaghan, M O'Neill (0-4); R Maher (0-3); C Galvin (0-2); E Quirke (0-1)	Report	A Ward (0-8, 0-6 frees, 0-1 '65); J Mannion, J Forde (0-2); I Creaven, J Mooney, L Kelly, R Doyle	MICL Grounds; Referee: Mick Murtagh

24 January 2017; 19:00; Round 1	IT Carlow	4-18 - 1-15	DIT	Carlow I.T. Referee: James McGrath
24 January 2017; 19:00; Round 1	S Maher (0-8, 0-5 frees); C Bolger (2-1); J Fagan (1-2); C Dwyer (0-4); M Kavanagh (0-3); M Redmond (1-0)	Report	B Maher (1-2), D McNicholas (0-4, 0-2 frees); C O'Donoghue (0-3, 0-2 frees); S Keating, J Guiney, R Greville, A Nugent, C Sheehan, T Doyle (0-1)	Carlow I.T. Referee: James McGrath

2 February 2017; 14:00; Round 2	IT Carlow	0-18 - 0-18	Mary I Limerick	Carlow I.T.
2 February 2017; 14:00; Round 2	Stephen Maher (0-9, 0-7 frees, 0-1 '65); Colin Dunford, Cha Dwyer, Marty Kavanagh (0-2); Enda Rowland (0-1 free); James Doyle, Tommy Nolan (0-1)	Report		Carlow I.T.

2 February 2017; 14:00; Round 2	DIT	3-15 - 0-11	GMIT	Carnmore; Referee: K McGeeney (Mayo)
2 February 2017; 14:00; Round 2	D McNicholas (1-4, 1-2 frees); L Blanchfield, S Keating (1-0); R Greville (0-3, 0-1 '65); B Maher (0-3); J Guiney (0-2); C Byrne, C Taylor, R Curley (0-1)	Report	A Ward (0-7 frees); D Mangan (0-2); C Slevin (0-1 penalty); E McEvoy (0-1)	Carnmore; Referee: K McGeeney (Mayo)

7 February 2017; 14:00; Round 3	GMIT	0-11 - 6-20	IT Carlow	Carnmore; Referee: M Murtagh (Westmeath)
7 February 2017; 14:00; Round 3	D Burke 0-9 (7f, 1 ’65), A Ward, D Conroy 0-1 each.	Report	S Maher 3-12 (8f, 0-2 ’65), M Russell 1-0, J Fagan 1-0, C Bolger 1-0, M Kavanagh 0-3, J Doyle 0-2, C Dwyer, E Rowland (f), T Nolan 0-1 each.	Carnmore; Referee: M Murtagh (Westmeath)

7 February 2017; 14:00; Round 3	DIT	1-8 - 5-28	Mary I Limerick	Grangegorman; Referee: Brian Gavin (Offaly)
7 February 2017; 14:00; Round 3	C O’Donoghue 1-0, C Taylor 0-2 (1f), D McNicholas 0-2f, J Walsh 0-1, J Guiney 0-1f, L Blanchfield 0-1, N Walsh 0-1.	Report	Aaron Gillane 3-9 (1-0 pen, 0-5f), Cian Lynch 0-6, Darragh O’Donovan 1-2, Thomas Monaghan 0-4, Tadhg Gallagher 1-0, Mikey O’Neill 0-2, Alan Flynn, Ronan Maher, Colm Galvin, Luke Meade, David Sweeney 0-1 each.	Grangegorman; Referee: Brian Gavin (Offaly)

=== Group B ===
Pos	Team	Pld	W	D	L	SF	SA	Diff	Pts
1	UL	2	2	0	0	4-44	2-28	22	4
2	NUI Galway	2	1	0	1	6-26	3-33	2	2
3	CIT	2	1	0	1	1-30	2-31	-2	2
4	DCU St Patricks Campus	2	0	0	2	1-18	5-28	-22	0

24 January 2017; 14:00; Round 1	UL	2-23 - 0-16	CIT	UL Grounds; Referee: Alan Kelly
24 January 2017; 14:00; Round 1	J McGrath (1-8, 0-6 frees, 0-1 '65); K Hehir (0-4); S Bennett (1-1); T Kelly, B Heffernan (0-2); A McGuane, T Morrissey, G Hegarty, J Forde, R Lynch, B Nash (0-1)	Report	M Kearney (0-11, 0-9 frees, 0-1 '65); M Cahalane (0-2); R Hanley, T O'Connor, A Coffey (0-1)	UL Grounds; Referee: Alan Kelly

25 January 2017; 13:00; Round 1	NUI Galway	4-14 - 1-12	DCU St Patricks Campus	NUIG; Referee: Brian Gavin (Offaly)
25 January 2017; 13:00; Round 1	S Conlon (2-2); C Cleary (1-3); K McHugo (1-2); G Hennelly (0-2 frees); G Loughnane (0-2), A Helebert (0-1 free); O Donnellan, C Whelan (0-1)		W Ryan (0-6, 0-4 frees); C Breathnach (1-1); P Spellacy (0-3); J Firman, C Brady (0-1)	NUIG; Referee: Brian Gavin (Offaly)

2 February 2017; 14:00; Round 2	UL	2-21 - 2-12	NUI Galway	UL Grounds; Referee: J McCormack (Tipperary)
2 February 2017; 14:00; Round 2	J McGrath (1-5, 0-4 frees); S Bennett (1-5); G Hegarty (0-4); D Fitzgerald, K Hehir (0-2); M Mullins, L Lyons, T Morrissey (0-1)	Report	N Mitchell (1-4 frees); S Conlon (1-1); K McHugo (0-2); G Hennelly (0-2, 0-1 free); C Cleary (0-2 frees); O Donnellan (0-1)	UL Grounds; Referee: J McCormack (Tipperary)

2 February 2017; 14:00; Round 2	CIT	1-14 - 0-6	DCU St Patricks Campus	St Pats GAA Pitch; Referee: J Keane (Galway)
2 February 2017; 14:00; Round 2	M Kearney (1-6, 1-0 penalty, 0-4 frees); A Coffey (0-3, 0-1 free); J O’Neill (0-2); J Buckley, T O’Connor, C Kingston (0-1)	Report	B Ryan (0-5 frees); P Spellacy (0-1)	St Pats GAA Pitch; Referee: J Keane (Galway)

7 February 2017; 14:00; Round 3	DCU St Patrick's Campus	2-14 - 4-31	UL	St Pats GAA Pitch; Referee: Gavin Quilty (Kilkenny)
7 February 2017; 14:00; Round 3	Billy Ryan 2-7 (1-7f), Sean Morrissey 0-4, Fearghal Curran 0-2, Christy Breathnach 0-1.	Report	Bobby Duggan 0-12 (1f, 1 65), John McGrath 1-8 (0-6f, 0-1 65), Lorcan Lyons 1-2, PJ Scully 1-1, Mike Mullins 1-0, Tony Kelly 0-3, Adrian Morrissey, Jason Forde, Aidan McGuane, Ronan Lynch & John Paul Lucey 0-1 each.	St Pats GAA Pitch; Referee: Gavin Quilty (Kilkenny)

7 February 2017; 14:00; Round 3	CIT	0-19 - 0-19	NUI Galway	Cork IT; Referee: Fergal Horgan (Tipperary)
7 February 2017; 14:00; Round 3	Michael Kearney 0-8 (0-6 frees), John O’Dwyer 0-5 (0-4 frees), Michael Cahalane, Jerry O’Neill 0-2 each, John Good, Andrew Coffey 0-1 each.	Report	Ger Hennelly 0-11 (0-8 frees, 0-2 65), Ian Fox, Kevin McHugo, Conor Whelan 0-2 each, Oisín Donnellan, Gearóid Loughnane 0-1 each.	Cork IT; Referee: Fergal Horgan (Tipperary)

=== Group C ===
Pos	Team	Pld	W	D	L	SF	SA	Diff	Pts
1	Limerick IT	2	2	0	0	6-33	0-22	29	4
2	WIT	2	1	0	1	5-25	2-22	12	2
3	DCU Dóchas Éireann	2	1	0	1	1-29	3-22	1	2
4	Trinity College Dublin	2	0	0	2	1-15	8-36	-42	0

24 January 2017; 14:00; Round 1	Limerick IT	4-21 - 0-7	Trinity College Dublin	Limerick IT; Referee: Joe Larkin (Cork)
24 January 2017; 14:00; Round 1	S Bennett (3-7, 1-0 pen, 0-6 frees); D Dempsey (1-2, 0-1 free); D Byrnes (0-3, 0-1 '65); P Killeen, P Duggan, J McCarthy (0-2); J Shanahan, B O'Gorman, J Campion (0-1)	Report	C O'Sullivan (0-6, 0-4 frees, 0-1 '65, 0-1 sideline); N Redmond (0-1)	Limerick IT; Referee: Joe Larkin (Cork)

24 January 2017; 19:00; Round 1	DCU Dóchas Éireann	1-14 - 1-10	WIT	Dublin City University Sportsgrounds; Referee: Patrick Murphy (Carlow)
24 January 2017; 19:00; Round 1	P Curran (1-6, 0-3 frees); J O'Connor, R McBride (0-2); G Bailey, P Hogan, K Doyle, AJ Murphy (0-1)	Report	L McGrath (0-7, 0-5 frees, 0-1 sideline); A Joyce, S McNulty, C Lyons (0-1)	Dublin City University Sportsgrounds; Referee: Patrick Murphy (Carlow)

2 February 2017; 14:00; Round 2	WIT	4-15 - 1-8	Trinity College Dublin	Santry Avenue; Referee: J Keenan (Wicklow)
2 February 2017; 14:00; Round 2	L McGrath 0-7 (5fs), S Ryan 2-0, A Joyce, J O’Connor 1-0 each, T Fox, S McNulty 0-2 each, J O’Dwyer, P Walsh, C Lyons, A Gleeson (f) 0-1 each.	Report	C O’Sullivan 1-6 (1-0 sl, 0-6fs), E Kelly, C O’Carroll 0-1 each.	Santry Avenue; Referee: J Keenan (Wicklow)

2 February 2017; 19:00; Round 2	Limerick IT	2-12 - 0-15	DCU Dóchas Éireann	Dublin City University Sportsgrounds; Referee: J McGrath (Westmeath)
2 February 2017; 19:00; Round 2	P Killeen 2-0, S Bennett 0-6 (3f), D Byrnes 0-2 (1f), D Reidy, M O'Malley, P Duggan, S Ryan 0-1 each	Report	P Curran 0-8 (6f), J O'Connor 0-2, P O'Dea 0-2, J Byrne 0-2, G Bailey 0-1.	Dublin City University Sportsgrounds; Referee: J McGrath (Westmeath)

7 February 2017; 14:00; Round 3	Trinity College Dublin	1-14 - 0-19	DCU Dóchas Éireann	Santry Avenue; Referee: James McGrath (Westmeath)
7 February 2017; 14:00; Round 3	Cian O’Sullivan 0-8 (6f), Jack O’Neill 1-0, Donncha Butler 0-3, Fionn O Riain Broin 0-2 (1f), Niall Redmond 0-1.	Report	Patrick Curran 0-12 (10f), Gavin Bailey 0-2, Rian McBride, AJ Murphy, Killian Doyle, Tony French & Eoghan Conroy 0-1 each.	Santry Avenue; Referee: James McGrath (Westmeath)

7 February 2017; 14:00; Round 3	WIT	3-13 - 5-14	Limerick IT	WIT Sports Campus
7 February 2017; 14:00; Round 3		Report		WIT Sports Campus

=== Group D ===
Pos	Team	Pld	W	D	L	SF	SA	Diff	Pts
1	UCC	3	3	0	0	6-43	3-23	29	6
2	UCD	3	2	0	1	2-51	1-26	28	4
3	Maynooth University	3	1	0	2	4-50	1-50	9	2
4	UUJ	3	0	0	3	3-16	10-61	-66	0

24 January 2017; 14:00; Round 1	UCC	5-13 - 2-4	UUJ	Mardyke; Referee: Gavin Quilty (Kilkenny)
24 January 2017; 14:00; Round 1	A Cadogan (3-1); R O'Shea (1-7, 0-6 frees); J O'Flynn (1-1); G O'Brien (0-2); R Cahalane, A Spillane (0-1)	Report	N McKeague (1-2, 0-2 frees); L Dunphy (1-0 free); J Connolly, K Rice (0-1)	Mardyke; Referee: Gavin Quilty (Kilkenny)

24 January 2017; 19:00; Round 1	UCD	0-21 - 0-13	Maynooth University	Belfield; Referee: John Keenan (Wicklow)
24 January 2017; 19:00; Round 1	DJ Foran (0-10, 0-4 frees, 0-2 '65s); D Dolan (0-3, 0-1 free); L Scanlon, C Cronin (0-2); T de Burca, J O'Connor, O O'Rorke, S Quirke (0-1)	Report		Belfield; Referee: John Keenan (Wicklow)

2 February 2017; 14:00; Round 2	Maynooth University	4-23 - 1-7	UUJ	Jordanstown; Referee: K Brady (Louth)
2 February 2017; 14:00; Round 2	B Molloy (1-13, 0-7 frees, 0-1 '65); P Walsh (0-5); D Egerton, N Kenny, E Kenny (1-0); D Burke, MJ Lalor (0-2); S O’Brien (0-1)	Report	N McKeague (1-2, 1-0 penalty); D Nugent (0-2, 0-1 free); K Rice, M Dudley, J Connolly (0-1)	Jordanstown; Referee: K Brady (Louth)

2 February 2017; 15:00; Round 2	UCC	1-8 - 1-5	UCD	Belfield; Referee: A Devine (Westmeath)
2 February 2017; 15:00; Round 2	M O’Brien (1-1); R O’Shea (0-3, 0-2 frees); A Cadogan, J O’Flynn, G O’Brien and C O’Leary (0-1)	Report	DJ Foran (1-3, 0-2 frees, 0-1 '65); C MacGabhann (0-2)	Belfield; Referee: A Devine (Westmeath)

7 February 2017; 14:00; Round 3	Maynooth University	0-14 - 0-22	UCC	Maynooth University North Campus
7 February 2017; 14:00; Round 3	B Molloy 0-9f, B Hogan 0-2f, C Breen, D Egerton, R Donohue 0-1 each.	Report	R O’Shea 0-9f, M O’Brien, J Barron 0-3 each; S Kennedy, C O’Leary 0-2 each; G O’Brien, T Devine, A Cadogan 0-1 each	Maynooth University North Campus

7 February 2017; 14:30; Round 3	UUJ	0-5 - 1-25	UCD	Jordanstown
7 February 2017; 14:30; Round 3		Report		Jordanstown

== Knockout stage ==
Quarter-finals
14 February -
UL	0-23
IT Carlow	4-16
14 February -
UCC	1-18
DCU Dóchas Éireann	0-16
14 February -
Mary I Limerick	4-18
NUIG	1-16
14 February -
LIT	1-20
UCD	1-13

Semi-finals
24 February - NUIG
IT Carlow	2-20
UCC	1-20
24 February - NUIG
Mary I Limerick	0-19
LIT	0-14

Final
25 February - NUIG
IT Carlow	1-19
Mary I Limerick	3-24

=== Quarter-finals ===
Group winners had home advantage for the quarter-finals.

14 February 2017; Quarter-final	UCC	1-18 - 0-16	DCU Dóchas Éireann	Mardyke; Referee: Alan Kelly (Galway)
14 February 2017; Quarter-final	Séamus Kennedy 0-4 (2f), Anthony Spillane 0-3, Michael Breen 1-0, Jamie Barron (0-1 free), Alan Cadogan (0-1 free), Chris O’Leary (0-2 frees) 0-2 each, Mark O’Brien, Conor Gleeson, Gavin O’Brien, Mark O’Connor, Michael O’Halloran 0-1 each.	Report	Patrick Curran 0-7 (0-6 frees), AJ Murphy 0-3, Rian McBride 0-2, Paul O’Dea, Liam Fahey, Paul Kelly, Killian Doyle 0-1 each.	Mardyke; Referee: Alan Kelly (Galway)

14 February 2017; Quarter-final	LIT	1-20 - 1-13	UCD	Limerick IT; Referee: Brian Gavin (Offaly)
14 February 2017; Quarter-final	P Killeen 0-7 (6f), J McCarthy 1-3, D Byrnes 0-3 (1f), S Bennett (1f) & D Dempsey 0-2 each, B O’Connell, P Duggan & W Connors 0-1 each.	Report	DJ Foran 0-5 (4f), L Scanlon 1-0, O O’Rorke 0-3 (2f), D Dolan 0-2, J Madden, T de Búrca (f) & J Maher 0-1 each.	Limerick IT; Referee: Brian Gavin (Offaly)

14 February 2017; Quarter-final	UL	0-23 - 4-16	IT Carlow	UL; Referee: Diarmuid Kirwan (Cork)
14 February 2017; Quarter-final	John McGrath 0-8 (6f, 1 ’65), Tony Kelly 0-4, David Fitzgerald 0-3, Gearoid Hegarty 0-2, Aidan McGuane 0-2, Aidan McGuane 0-2, Michael Mullins 0-1, Jason Forde 0-1 (f).	Report	Stephen Maher 0-6 (4f, 1 ’65), Jack Fagan 1-2, Martin Kavanagh 1-2, Mark Russell 1-1, Chris Bolger 1-1, Charles Dwyer 0-2, James Doyle 0-1, Colin Dunford 0-1.	UL; Referee: Diarmuid Kirwan (Cork)

14 February 2017; Quarter-final	Mary I Limerick	4-18 - 1-16	NUIG	MICL Grounds; Referee: Fergal Horgan (Tipperary)
14 February 2017; Quarter-final	Aaron Gillane 2-10 (0-4f, 0-2 65s), Luke Meade 1-2, Tadhg Gallagher 1-0, Michael O’Neill 0-3, Darragh O’Donovan 0-2, Thomas Monaghan 0-1.	Report	Gerry Hennelly 0-9 (6f, 1 65), Gearoid Loughnane 1-0, Conor Whelan 0-3 (1f, 1 sl), Conor Cleary (f), Ian Fox, Oisin Donnellan & Sam Conlon 0-1 each.	MICL Grounds; Referee: Fergal Horgan (Tipperary)

=== Semi-finals ===
24 February 2017; 13:00; Semi-final	IT Carlow	2-20 - 1-20	UCC	NUIG; Referee: Barry Kelly (Westmeath)
24 February 2017; 13:00; Semi-final	S Maher 0-11 (6f, 2’65), C Bolger 0-4, K Kelly 1-1, C Dunford 1-0, M Kavanagh 0-2, J Fagan 0-1, E Rowland 0-1 (1f).	Report	R O’Shea 0-7 (5f), M Breen 0-5, J Power 1-1, A Spillane 0-2, J Barron 0-2, A Cadagon 0-1, M O’Connor 0-1, T Devine 0-1.	NUIG; Referee: Barry Kelly (Westmeath)

24 February 2017; 15:00; Semi-final	Mary I Limerick	0-19 - 0-14	LIT	NUIG; Referee: Paud O’Dwyer (Carlow)
24 February 2017; 15:00; Semi-final	A Gillane 0-12 (10f, 1’65), C Galvin 0-3, D O’Donovan 0-1 (1’sl), R Maher 0-1, M O’Neill 0-1, S Cahill 0-1.	Report	P Killeen 0-7 (7f), P Duggan 0-2 (2f), W Connors 0-2, D Dempsey 0-1, J McCarthy 0-1 (1f), S Ryan 0-1.	NUIG; Referee: Paud O’Dwyer (Carlow)

=== Final ===
25 February 2017; 14:00; Final	IT Carlow	1-19 - 3-24	Mary I Limerick	Pearse Stadium; Referee: Brian Gavin (Offaly)
25 February 2017; 14:00; Final	S Maher 1-13 (12fs), C Dunford 0-2, C Dwyer 0-2, M Kavanagh 0-1, C Bolger 0-1.	Report	A Gillane 1-5 (1-0 pen, 4fs), D O’Donovan 1-3 (0-2 sl), R Maher 0-4 (3fs), P Ryan 1-0, M O’Neill 0-3, C Lynch 0-3, C Twomey 0-3, C Galvin 0-1, L Meade 0-1, S Cahill 0-1.	Pearse Stadium; Referee: Brian Gavin (Offaly)

== Awards ==
Team of the Year

1. Enda Rowland
2. David Sweeney
3. Damien Healy
4. Dwayne Palmer
5. Conor Twomey
6. Ronan Maher
7. Willie Connors
8. Stephen Cahill
9. Michael Breen
10. Darragh O'Donovan
11. Michael O'Neill
12. Cian Lynch
13. Aaron Gillane
14. Stephen Maher
15. John Hetherton
