= 2016 Tipperary Senior Hurling Championship =

Annual hurling competition season

- Dates: 9 April - 16 October 2016
- Teams: 30
- Sponsor: Clean Ireland Recycling
- Champions: Thurles Sarsfields; Pádraic Maher (captain); Tommy Maher (manager)
- Runners-up: Kiladangan; Darragh Egan (captain); Alan Flynn (captain); Dan Hackett (manager)

Tournament statistics
- Matches played: 58
- Top scorer(s): Pa Bourke (2-51)

The 2016 Tipperary Senior Hurling Championship was the 125th staging of the Tipperary Senior Hurling Championship since its establishment by the Tipperary County Board in 1887. The first round of the Championship began on 9 April.

Thurles Sarsfields were the defending champions.

Thurles Sarsfields played Kiladangan in the final, a repeat of the 1938 decider, Kiladangan's last appearance in the final.

The final was played in Semple Stadium on 16 October, with Thurles Sarsfields winning the game by 0–27 to 1–15 in front of 6,546 spectators. Tipperary and Thurles legend Mickey Byrne died at age 93 on the morning of the match. It was a third successive win for Thurles, and the first time they've won three-in-a-row since the 1960s.

== Results ==
=== Group stage ===
==== Roinn 1 Group 1 table ====
Team	Matches				Score			Pts
Team	Pld	W	D	L	For	Against	Diff	Pts
Killenaule	3	1	2	0	7-48	5-41	13	4
Drom-Inch	3	1	2	0	5-50	6-41	6	4
Upperchurch-Drombane	3	1	1	1	4-51	1-52	8	3
J. K. Bracken's	1	0	1	2	4-30	8-45	-27	1

==== Roinn 1 Group 1 results ====
9 April 2016 Round 1	Killenaule	3-15 - 2-05	J. K. Bracken's	St. Michael's Park
	K Bergin 2-2, T Doyle 0-7, E Barry 1-2, John O'Dwyer 0-2, M Doyle 0-1, N O'Dwyer 0-1.		L Fairbrother 1-4, S Scully 1-0, S Bourke 0-1.

29 May 2016 Round 1	Drom-Inch	1-19 - 0-16	Upperchurch-Drombane	Páirc Shíleáin
	S Callanan 0-7, J Ryan 0-6, J Bergin 1-1, D Butler 0-2, D Collins 0-1, T Nolan 0-1, M Connors 0-1.		P Ryan 0-8, P Greene 0-3, P Shanahan 0-2, J Butler 0-1, C Stapleton 0-1, P Shortt 0-1.

24 April 2016 Round 2	Killenaule	0-20 - 1-17	Upperchurch-Drombane	Boherlahen Sportsfield
	John O'Dwyer 0-11, K Bergin 0-3, N O'Dwyer 0-2, D Guinan 0-2, Joe O'Dwyer 0-1, M Doyle 0-1.		P Ryan 0-5, C Stapleton 1-0, P Shanahan 0-3, P Shortt 0-2, L Ryan 0-2, J Barry 0-1, J Ryan 0-1, J Greene 0-1, J McGuire 0-1, J Butler 0-1.

24 April 2016 Round 2	Drom-Inch	2-12 - 2-12	J. K. Bracken's	Bishop Quinlan Park
	S Callanan 1-6, D Butler 1-1, J Ryan 0-3, K Hassett 0-1, M Connors 0-1.		L Fairbrother 1-9, S Bourke 1-0, S Scully 0-2, D McEnroe 0-1.

8 May 2016 Round 3	Upperchurch-Drombane	3-18 - 0-13	J. K. Bracken's	The Ragg
	P Shortt 3-6, O Shortt 0-3, L Ryan 0-2, P Greene 0-2, M Greene 0-1, G Ryan 0-1, P Shanahan 0-1, P Ryan 0-1.		L Fairbrother 0-5, S Scully 0-4, S Bourke 0-2, SP Guerin 0-1, E Fitzpatrick 0-1.

8 May 2016 Round 3	Drom-Inch	2-19 - 4-13	Killenaule
	S Callanan 1-7, J Woodlock 1-2, J Ryan 0-3, M Connors 0-2, L Ryan 0-1, E Walsh 0-1, D Collins 0-1, D Butler 0-1, T Nolan 0-1.		John O'Dwyer 2-8, E Barry 1-1, K Bergin 1-1, T Doyle 0-1, M Doyle 0-1, N O'Dwyer 0-1.

==== Roinn 1 Group 2 table ====
Team	Matches				Score			Pts
Team	Pld	W	D	L	For	Against	Diff	Pts
Thurles Sarsfields	3	3	0	0	4-63	2-34	35	6
Borris-Ileigh	3	1	1	1	2-42	4-38	-2	3
Éire Óg Annacarty	3	1	0	2	0-38	1-45	-10	2
Roscrea	3	0	1	2	3-28	2-54	-23	1

==== Roinn 1 Group 2 results ====
9 April 2016 Round 1	Éire Óg Annacarty	0-12 - 0-10	Roscrea	The Ragg
	D O'Dwyer 0-5, D Crosse 0-2, T Fox 0-1, P O'Dwyer 0-1, C O'Brien 0-1, E Bradshaw 0-1, G Ryan 0-1.		J Fitzpatrick 0-8, E Fitzpatrick 0-1, D O'Connor 0-1.

16 April 2016 Round 1	Thurles Sarsfields	2-17 - 1-11	Borris-Ileigh	Páirc Shíleáin
	P Bourke 1-9, J Maher 1-1, C Lanigan 0-4, S Lillis 0-1, B McCarthy 0-1, D Maher 0-1.		C Cowan 1-1, C Kenny 0-3, L Ryan 0-2, S Maher 0-2, N Kenny 0-1, D McCormack 0-1, T Fahey 0-1.

24 April 2016 Round 2	Thurles Sarsfields	2-26 - 1-08	Roscrea	Páirc Shíleáin
	P Bourke 0-11, A McCormack 0-6, C Lanigan 1-2, R Ruth 1-1, B McCarthy 0-2, T Doyle 0-2, S Cahill 0-1, J Maher 0-1.		D Flynn 1-2, J Fitzpatrick 0-2, C Sheedy 0-2, S Davis 0-1, S Conlon 0-1.

24 April 2016 Round 2	Borris-Ileigh	1-15 - 0-11	Éire Óg Annacarty	Boherlahan Sportsfield
	N Kenny 1-2, D McCormack 0-4, J Kelly 0-3, C Kenny 0-3, B Maher 0-1, V Stapleton 0-1, B Maher 0-1.		D O'Dwyer 0-4, C O'Brien 0-2, E Bradshaw 0-1, D Crosse 0-1, R O'Brien 0-1, S Ryan 0-1, D Mooney 0-1.

7 May 2016 Round 3	Borris-Ileigh	0-16 - 2-10	Roscrea	St. Flannan's Park
	J Kelly 0-7, C Kenny 0-4, D McCormack 0-2, K Maher 0-1, D O'Connor 0-1, L Ryan 0-1.		S Fletcher 1-3, D Flynn 1-1, J Fitzpatrick 0-4, E Fitzpatrick 0-2.

7 May 2016 Round 3	Thurles Sarsfields	0-20 - 0-15	Éire Óg Annacarty	Kickham Park
	P Bourke 0-8, B McCarthy 0-3, A McCormack 0-2, L Corbett 0-2, C Lanigan 0-2, J Maher 0-1, T Doyle 0-1, S Cahill 0-1.		C O'Brien 0-8, D O'Dwyer 0-3, R O'Brien 0-2, D Crosse 0-1, S Ryan 0-1.

==== Roinn 1 Group 3 table ====
Team	Matches				Score			Pts
Team	Pld	W	D	L	For	Against	Diff	Pts
Kiladangan	3	3	0	0	7-57	3-44	25	6
Mullinahone	3	2	0	1	3-42	4-50	-11	4
Nenagh Éire Óg	3	1	0	2	1-58	5-41	5	2
Templederry Kenyons	3	0	0	3	4-44	3-66	-19	0

==== Roinn 1 Group 3 results ====
9 April 2016 Round 1	Kiladangan	1-15 - 0-14	Nenagh Éire Óg	Lacken Park
	D Egan 0-6, W Connors 1-1, P Flynn 0-3, J Gallagher 0-2, D O'Meara 0-1, R Gleeson 0-1, T Gallagher 0-1.		T Heffernan 0-4, M Heffernan 0-4, A Coffey 0-2, D Quinn 0-1, P Murphy 0-1, J Mackey 0-1, P Morris 0-1.

16 April 2016 Round 1	Mullinahone	0-17 - 0-13	Templederry Kenyons	Moyne-Templetuohy GAA Grounds
	E Kelly 0-9, M Dunne 0-3, S Curran 0-2, J Shelly 0-1, K Bolger 0-1, G Horan 0-1.		E Murray 0-6, A Ryan 0-3, G Ryan 0-1, P O'Leary 0-1, T Stapleton 0-1, L McCutcheon 0-1.

24 April 2016 Round 2	Kiladangan	4-20 - 1-12	Mullinahone	Páirc Shíleáin
	D Egan 1-6, P Flynn 1-3, R Gleeson 1-1, J Gallagher 1-1, D O'Meara 0-3, W Connors 0-3, T Gallagher 0-2, E Kelly 0-1.		E Kelly 1-4, S Curran 0-5, K Bolger 0-1, L Mullally 0-1, C Horan 0-1.

24 April 2016 Round 2	Nenagh Éire Óg	1-27 - 2-13	Templederry Kenyons	Silvermines GAA Grounds
	M Heffernan 0-9, A Coffey 1-3, T Heffernan 0-3, J Mackey 0-3, D Quinn 0-3, P Murphy 0-2, C Ryan 0-1, A Grattan 0-1, P Hickey 0-1, P Morris 0-1.		E Murray 0-7, G Ryan 1-1, M Hogan 1-0, J Harkin 0-1, T Ryan 0-1, P O'Leary 0-1, Darragh Carey 0-1, Dylan Carey 0-1.

8 May 2016 Round 3	Kiladangan	2-22 - 2-18	Templederry Kenyons	Silvermines GAA Grounds
	D Egan 0-12, J Gallagher 1-1, P Flynn 1-1, W Connors 0-4, R Gleeson 0-3, D O'Meara 0-1.		M Hogan 2-1, E Murray 0-7, A Ryan 0-3, P O'Leary 0-2, Dylan Carey 0-2, Darragh Carey 0-1, G Ryan 0-1, C Coughlan 0-1.

8 May 2016 Round 3	Mullinahone	2-13 - 0-17	Nenagh Éire Óg	Páirc Shíleáin
	S Curran 2-8, K Bolger 0-2, G Horan 0-1, K Walzer 0-1, P Kelly 0-1.		M Heffernan 0-11, D Quinn 0-3, S Maher 0-1, T Heffernan 0-1, P Murphy 0-1.

==== Roinn 1 Group 4 table ====
Team	Matches				Score			Pts
Team	Pld	W	D	L	For	Against	Diff	Pts
Clonoulty-Rossmore	3	3	0	0	1-56	4-34	13	6
Kilruane MacDonaghs	3	2	0	1	1-58	3-45	7	4
Portroe	3	1	0	2	5-43	1-53	2	2
Lorrha	3	0	0	3	2-47	1-62	-12	0

==== Roinn 1 Group 4 results ====
10 April 2016 Round 1	Clonoulty-Rossmore	0-18 - 1-12	Kilruane MacDonaghs	Silvermines GAA Grounds
	C Hammersley 0-7, T Hammersley 0-5, M Ryan 0-2, F O'Keeffe 0-2, S Maher 0-1, J O'Keeffe 0-1.		S Hennessy 0-7, C Darcy 1-1, T Cleary 0-2, K Cahill 0-2.

17 April 2016 Round 1	Portroe	1-15 - 0-16	Lorrha	MacDonagh Park
	K O'Halloran 1-3, J Sheedy 0-5, M Gennery 0-2, C Gleeson 0-2, C Leo 0-1, J Ryan 0-1, A McCloskey 0-1.		C Hogan 0-9, B Hogan 0-4, E McIntyre 0-2, C Duggan 0-1.

24 April 2016 Round 2	Kilruane MacDonaghs	0-18 - 2-09	Portroe	Páirc Shíleáin
	S Hennessy 0-9, C Cleary 0-3, K Cahill 0-3, T Cleary 0-1, T Hogan 0-1, J Williams 0-1.		M Gennery 2-0, J Sheedy 0-6, K O'Halloran 0-2, A McCloskey 0-1.

24 April 2016 Round 2	Clonoulty-Rossmore	0-19 - 1-13	Lorrha	Silvermines GAA Grounds
	C Hammersley 0-12, S Maher 0-3, M Ryan 0-1, P White 0-1, P Ryan 0-1.		P Maher 0-5, C Fogarty 1-0, W Maher 0-2, C Hogan 0-2, B Hogan 0-2, E McIntyre 0-1, C Haugh 0-1.

7 May 2016 Round 3	Kilruane MacDonaghs	0-28 - 1-18	Lorrha	Páirc Gairnéir
	S Hennessy 0-9, K Cahill 0-6, C Cleary 0-4, T Cleary 0-3, J Williams 0-2, B O'Meara 0-2, J Cleary 0-1, J Cahill 0-1.		P Maher 1-9, W Maher 0-4, C Hogan 0-1, R O'Meara 0-1, N McIntyre 0-1, C Haugh 0-1, E McIntyre 0-1.

8 May 2016 Round 3	Clonoulty-Rossmore	1-19 - 2-09	Portroe	Silvermines GAA Grounds
	C Hammersley 1-11, F O'Keeffe 0-4, P White 0-2, D Quirke 0-1, P Ryan 0-1.		J Sheedy 1-5, K O'Halloran 1-1, R Byrne 0-1, J Ryan 0-1, R Mulrooney 0-1.

==== Roinn 1 relegation group table ====
Team	Matches				Score			Pts
Team	Pld	W	D	L	For	Against	Diff	Pts
Silvermines	3	3	0	0	3-57	4-45	9	6
Knockavilla-Donaskeigh Kickhams	3	1	2	0	9-35	4-48	2	4
Moneygall	2	0	1	1	3-26	5-27	-4	1
Moyne-Templetuohy	2	0	1	1	1-33	3-31	-4	1

==== Roinn 1 relegation group results ====
24 September 2016 Round 1	Silvermines	0-19 - 0-15	Moyne-Templetuohy	Clonoulty GAA Grounds
	J Forde 0-6, David Keogh 0-4, O Quirke 0-3, W Keogh 0-2, A Hayden 0-1, Daniel Keogh 0-1, E Corcoran 0-1, R Sherlock 0-1.		M Kelly 0-9, T Meade 0-2, J Bergin 0-1, J Hassett 0-1, T Hamill 0-1, D Fogarty 0-1.

25 September 2016 Round 1	Knockavilla-Donaskeigh Kickhams	4-06 - 1-13	Moneygall	Moyne-Templetuohy GAA Grounds
	D Browne 2-1, G Browne 1-1, M Shanahan 1-0, D Butler 0-3, D McGrath 0-1.		A Hogan 0-8, S Fogarty 1-1, B Kenny 0-2, G Kirwan 0-2.

9 October 2016 Round 2	Silvermines	1-21 - 2-13	Moneygall	Toomevara
	J Forde 0-8, W Keogh 0-6, S Quirke 1-0, Daniel Keogh 0-2, E Corcoran 0-2, David Keogh 0-1, O Quirke 0-1, B Seymour 0-1.		A Hogan 0-7, W Greene 1-1, B Kenny 0-2, C Ryan 0-1, E Whyte 0-1, B Teehan 0-1.

9 October 2016 Round 2	Knockavilla-Donaskeigh Kickhams	3-12 - 1-18	Moyne-Templetuohy	St. Michael's Park

15 October 2016 Round 3	SIlvermines	2-17 - 2-17	Knockavilla-Donaskeigh Kickhams	Páirc Shíleáin
	J Forde 0-9, Daniel Keogh 1-2, David Keogh 1-0, O Quirke 0-2, P Fogarty 0-1, Donal Keogh 0-1, G Toohey 0-1, C Gleeson 0-1.		D Butler 0-5, D Browne 1-1, G Browne 0-4, N Hayes 1-0, P O'Dwyer 0-3, K Loughnane 0-2, J Ryan 0-1, B Ryan 0-1.

Round 3	Moyne-Templetuohy	Cancelled	Moneygall

==== Roinn 2 Group 1 table ====
Team	Matches				Score			Pts
Team	Pld	W	D	L	For	Against	Diff	Pts
Burgess	3	1	2	0	5-43	2-47	5	4
Holycross-Ballycahill	3	2	0	1	2-45	2-32	13	4
Toomevara	3	1	1	1	3-45	2-45	3	3
Moyne-Templetuohy	3	0	1	2	2-43	6-52	-21	1

==== Roinn 2 Group 1 results ====
9 April 2016 Round 1	Moyne-Templetuohy	1-21 - 3-15	Burgess	St. Michael's Park
	J Bergin 0-10, D Fogarty 1-2, T Hassett 0-5, M Kelly 0-2, J Fogarty 0-1, T Hamill 0-1.		S Murray 3-8, B Hogan 0-3, D Ryan 0-3, B O'Flaherty 0-1.

16 April 2016 Round 1	Holycross-Ballycahill	0-19 - 1-08	Toomevara	Silvermines GAA Grounds
	T Comerford 0-5, C Barrett 0-4, L Dwan 0-3, R Stakelum 0-3, M Doyle 0-1, D Duggan 0-1, L O'Meara 0-1, J Woods 0-1.		M McCarthy 1-0, J McLoughney 0-2, K Dunne 0-2, D Delaney 0-1, J Ryan 0-1, R Quirke 0-1, C Canning 0-1.

23 April 2016 Round 2	Toomevara	0-14 - 1-11	Burgess	MacDonagh Park
	K Dunne 0-7, M McCarthy 0-2, J Ryan 0-1, J McLoughney 0-1, F Devaney 0-1, J Delaney 0-1, J McCarthy 0-1.		S Murray 0-7, B O'Flaherty 1-0, B Hogan 0-2, E Hogan 0-1, D O'Brien 0-1.

24 April 2016 Round 2	Holycross-Ballycahill	1-14 - 0-07	Moyne-Templetuohy	The Ragg
	D Duggan 1-0, R Stakelum 0-3, T Comerford 0-3, C Barrett 0-2, J Ferncombe 0-1, J Woods 0-2, C Carroll 0-1, S Flanagan 0-1.		J Bergin 0-3, T Hamill 0-1, T Hassett 0-1, J Fogarty 0-1, T Meade 0-1.

8 May 2016 Round 3	Toomevara	2-23 - 1-15	Moyne-Templetuohy	St. Cronan's Park
	K Dunne 1-8, J Delaney 1-5, F Devaney 0-3, J O'Brien 0-2, J McLoughney 0-2, C Canning 0-1, J Ryan 0-1, M McCarthy 0-1.		M Kelly 0-4, D Fogarty 1-0, J Bergin 0-3, J Morrissey 0-3, T Meade 0-2, T Hassett 0-1, P Maher 0-1, T Hamill 0-1.

8 May 2016 Round 3	Burgess	1-17 - 1-12	Holycross-Ballycahill	Páirc Shíleáin
	S Murray 0-12, S Maher 1-0, B O'Flaherty 0-2, D O'Brien 0-2, B Hogan 0-1.		J Woods 0-4, L Dwan 0-4, K Skehan 1-0, C Barrett 0-2, T Comerford 0-1, P Morris 0-1.

==== Roinn 2 Group 2 table ====
Team	Matches				Score			Pts
Team	Pld	W	D	L	For	Against	Diff	Pts
Carrick Swans	2	2	0	0	1-35	1-28	7	4
Moycarkey-Borris	2	1	0	1	2-37	3-28	6	2
Moneygall	2	0	0	2	2-19	1-35	-13	0

==== Roinn 2 Group 1 results ====
17 April 2016 Round 1	Carrick Swans	0-16 - 0-10	Moneygall	The Ragg
	D O'Hanlon 0-7, K Lanigan 0-3, A Dunne 0-3, L Wall 0-1, C Loughman 0-1, D McCarthy 0-1.		A Hogan 0-6, B Teehan 0-2, C Ryan 0-1, M Ryan 0-1.

23 April 2016 Round 2	Carrick Swans	1-19 - 1-18	Moycarkey-Borris	Rockwell Rovers GAA Grounds
	D O'Hanlon 0-9, A Dunne 0-4, J Waters 1-0, E O'Halloran 0-3, S Hennessy 0-2, K Lanigan 0-1.		K Morris 0-13, C Hayes 1-1, N Heffernan 0-1, P Ralph 0-1, P Carey 0-1, A Healy 0-1.

8 May 2016 Round 3	Moycarkey-Borris	1-19 - 2-09	Moneygall	Moyne-Templetuohy GAA Grounds
	K Morris 0-6, N Heffernan 1-1, P Carey 0-4, P Ralph 0-2, P Molloy 0-2, B Moran 0-1, C Hayes 0-1, R O'Regan 0-1, T Hayes 0-1.		A Hogan 1-1, E Troy 1-0, W Greene 0-2, P Fanning 0-2, C Ryan 0-1, M Ryan 0-1, S Fogarty 0-1, G Kirwan 0-1.

==== Roinn 2 Group 3 table ====
Team	Matches				Score			Pts
Team	Pld	W	D	L	For	Against	Diff	Pts
Loughmore-Castleiney	2	2	0	0	1-45	3-20	19	4
Borrisokane	2	1	0	1	4-23	1-36	-4	2
Knockavilla-Donaskeigh Kickhams	2	0	0	2	2-31	3-43	-15	0

==== Roinn 2 Group 3 results ====
9 April 2016 Round 1	Loughmore-Castleiney	1-17 - 1-08	Borrisokane	St. Flannan's Park
	J McGrath 0-8, L McGrath 1-2, E Sweeney 0-2, C Hennessy 0-2, A McGrath 0-1, T McGrath 0-1, B O'Connell 0-1.		G Ryan 1-2, S Dooley 0-5, P McSherry 0-1.

24 April 2016 Round 2	Borrisokane	3-15 - 0-19	Knockavilla-Donaskeigh Kickhams	Lacken Park
	S Dooley 0-10, A Austin 2-0, G Ryan 1-1, P Austin 0-4.		D Butler 0-11, D Browne 0-3, G Browne 0-2, P O'Dwyer 0-1, B Ryan 0-1, P Slattery 0-1.

8 May 2016 Round 3	Loughmore-Castleiney	0-28 - 2-12	Knockavilla-Donaskeigh Kickhams	Boherlahen Sportsfield
	N McGrath 0-7, L McGrath 0-6, B O'Connell 0-4, J Meagher 0-3, C McGrath 0-3, C Hennessy 0-2, L Treacy 0-1, B McGrath 0-1, T McGrath 0-1.		D Butler 1-5, B Ryan 1-1, G Browne 0-3, J Ryan 0-2, D Hayes 1-1.

==== Roinn 2 Group 4 table ====
Team	Matches				Score			Pts
Team	Pld	W	D	L	For	Against	Diff	Pts
Ballina	3	2	1	0	3-45	3-31	14	5
Ballingarry	3	2	1	0	4-40	1-39	10	5
Clonakenny	3	1	0	2	3-45	3-47	-2	2
Silvermines	3	0	0	3	3-28	6-41	-22	0

==== Roinn 2 Group 4 results ====
10 April 2016 Round 1	Ballina	2-14 - 2-06	Silvermines	Páirc Shíleáin
	M Breen 1-10, S O'Brien 1-1, C Maguire 0-1, P Cosgrove 0-1, D Finnerty 0-1.		J Forde 1-4, A Hayden 1-1, P Fogarty 0-1.

16 April 2016 Round 1	Ballingarry	2-15 - 0-18	Clonakenny	Boherlahen Sportsfield
	A Cleere 0-7, P Ivors 1-3, C Shelly 1-0, G Fennelly 0-2, P Hayes 0-2, D Walsh 0-1.		W Ryan 0-11, JJ Ryan 0-4, B Bergin 0-1, MJ Carroll 0-1, D Murray 0-1.

24 April 2016 Round 2	Ballina	1-20 - 1-14	Clonakenny	St. Michael's Park
	M Breen 0-13, B Keogh 1-2, D Hickey 0-1, B Stritch 0-1, K Cosgrave 0-1, S O'Brien 0-1, T Collins 0-1.		J Ryan 0-6, W Moloughney 1-0, W Ryan 0-3, D Murray 0-2, B Bergin 0-2, J Carroll 0-1.

23 April 2016 Round 2	Ballingarry	2-14 - 1-10	Silvermines	St. Michael's Park
	A Cleere 0-8, C Mangan 1-0, D Walsh 1-0, C Shelly 0-3, P Ivors 0-2, R Butler 0-1.		J Forde 1-6, O Quirke 0-1, P Fogarty 0-1, W Keogh 0-1, D Keogh 0-1.

7 May 2016 Round 3	Clonakenny	2-13 - 0-12	Silvermines	St. Michael's Park
	JJ Ryan 0-5, D Ryan 1-0, D Murray 1-0, B Bergin 0-3, W Ryan 0-2, J Carroll 0-2.		W Keogh 0-4, D Keogh 0-2, S Quirke 0-2, O Quirke 0-2, J Forde 0-1, P Fogarty 0-1.

8 May 2016 Round 3	Ballina	0-11 - 0-11	Ballingarry	Moyne-Templetuohy GAA Grounds
	M Breen 0-5, D Hickey 0-4, C O'Sullivan 0-1, T Collins 0-1.		A Cleere 0-5, D Walsh 0-3, J Fennelly 0-2, P Hayes 0-1.

=== Preliminary quarter-finals ===
25 September 2016 Preliminary quarter-final	Mullinahone	0-19 - 0-16	Ballina	Moyne-Templetuohy GAA Grounds
	E Kelly 0-15, K Bolger 0-1, M Dunne 0-1, P Kelly 0-1, D Cody 0-1.		M Breen 0-12, P Cosgrove 0-2, D Healy 0-1, B McKeogh 0-1.

25 September 2016 Preliminary quarter-final	Borris-Ileigh	1-17 - 1-13	Burgess	Silvermines GAA Grounds
	N Kenny 1-2, D McCormack 0-4, J Kelly 0-4, B Maher 0-3, M Stapleton 0-2, S McCormack 0-1, J Hogan 0-1.		S Murray 0-12, B O'Flaherty 1-0, S Maher 0-1.

25 September 2016 Preliminary quarter-final	Kilruane MacDonaghs	5-27 - 0-06	Carrick Swans	St. Michael's Park
	S Hennessy 1-6, C Cahill 1-4, T Cleary 1-2, C Darcy 1-2, D Peters 1-1, B O'Meara 0-4, C Cleary 0-3, J Williams 0-3, E Hogan 0-2.		D O'Hanlon 0-2, C Waters 0-1, E O'Halloran 0-1, S Hahessy 0-1, L Gahan 0-1.

25 September 2016 Preliminary quarter-final	Drom-Inch	1-16 - 0-18	Loughmore-Castleiney	St. Michael's Park
	S Callanan 0-7, S Butler 1-1, D Butler 0-2, J Ryan 0-2, D Collins 0-1, E Walshe 0-1, M Campion 0-1, J Moloney 0-1.		J McGrath 0-8, A McGrath 0-3, M McGrath 0-3, T McGrath 0-1, B McGrath 0-1, L Treacy 0-1, J Meagher 0-1.

=== Quarter-finals ===
1 October 2017 Quarter-final	Thurles Sarsfields	2-22 - 0-13	Borris-Ileigh	Semple Stadium
	P Bourke 1-8, R Ruth 1-2, A McCormack 0-4, C Lanigan 0-2, S Maher 0-1, M Cahill 0-1, J Maher 0-1, S Lillis 0-1, S Cahill 0-1, L Corbett 0-1.		J Kelly 0-6, B Maher 0-3, S McCormack 0-2, N Kenny 0-1, D McCormack 0-1.

1 October 2016 Quarter-final	Killenaule	2-20 - 1-20	Kilruane MacDonaghs	Semple Stadium
	J O'Dwyer 0-13, P Feehan 1-2, M Doyle 1-0, E O'Connell 0-3, N O'Dwyer 0-1, D O'Connor 0-1.		S Hennessy 0-8, T Cleary 0-4, K Cahill 0-4, C Darcy 1-0, J Williams 0-1, D Peters 0-1, B O'Meara 0-1, J Cleary 0-1.

2 October 2016 Quarter-final	Clonoulty-Rossmore	1-18 - 1-10	Mullinahone	Semple Stadium
	T Hammersley 0-10, P White 1-0, P Ryan 0-2, F O'Keeffe 0-2, M Ryan 0-1, S Maher 0-1, D Quirke 0-1, C Quirke 0-1.		S Curran 0-6, E Keane 1-1, G Horan 0-2, E Kelly 0-1.

2 October 2016 Quarter-final	Kiladangan	2-18 - 1-17	Drom-Inch	Semple Stadium
	T Gallagher 1-4, P Flynn 0-6, R Gleeson 1-2, D Egan 0-4, J Horan 0-1, D Sweeney 0-1.		S Callanan 0-6, M Connors 1-0, J Ryan 0-3, J Woodlock 0-2, D Collins 0-2, K Hassett 0-1, D Butler 0-1, S Butler 0-1< P Kennedy 0-1.

=== Semi-finals ===
9 October 2016 Semi-Final	Clonoulty-Rossmore	0-15 - 1-22	Thurles Sarsfields	Semple Stadium
15:30	T Hammersley 0-10, R Heffernan 0-3, S Maher 0-1, M Ryan 0-1.		P Bourke 0-6, S Cahill 0-5, R Ruth 1-1, A McCormack 0-2, L Corbett 0-2, R Maher 0-1, P Maher 0-1, B McCarthy 0-1, D Maher 0-1, M Cahill 0-1, J Maher 0-1.	Attendance: 6,546

9 October 2016 Semi-Final	Kildangan	2-16 - 0-13	Killenaule	Semple Stadium
15:30	J Gallagher 2-1, D Egan 0-5, R Gleeson 0-3, P Flynn 0-2, T Gallagher 0-2, J Horan 0-1, A Flynn 0-1, M Minehan 0-1.		J O'Dwyer 0-3, D O'Connor 0-2, T Doyle 0-2, E Barry 0-2, S Hannigan 0-1, P Feehan 0-1, K Bergin 0-1, N O'Dwyer 0-1.	Attendance: 6,546

=== Final ===
16 October 2016 Final	Thurles Sarsfields	0-27 - 1-15	Kildangan	Semple Stadium
15:30	P Bourke 0-9 (7fs), A McCormack 0-6, R Ruth 0-5, R Maher (1 sl) and C Lanigan 0-2 each, S Maher, S Lillis and L Corbett 0-1 each.	Report	D Egan 0-6 (5fs), J Gallagher 1-1, W Connors 0-3 (1 65s), R Gleeson 0-2, J Horan, P Flynn and T Gallagher 0-1 each.	Attendance: 6,546; Referee: J McCormack

== Championship statistics ==
=== Top scorers ===
In a single game

Rank	Player	Club	Tally	Total	Matches	Average
1	Pa Bourke	Thurles Sarsfields	2-51	57	6	9.50
2	Stephen Murray	Burgess	3-39	48	4	12.00
3	John O'Dwyer	Killenaule	2-37	43	5	8.60
3	Michael Breen	Ballina	1-40	43	4	10.75
5	Séamus Hennessy	Kilruane MacDonaghs	1-39	42	5	9.40
5	Darragh Egan	Kiladangan	1-39	42	7	7.00
7	Jason Forde	Silvermines	2-34	40	6	6.66
8	Séamus Callanan	Drom-Inch	2-33	39	5	7.80
9	Conor Hammersley	Clonoulty-Rossmore	1-30	33	3	11.00
10	Eoin Kelly	Mullinahone	1-29	32	4	8.00

In a single game

Rank	Player	Club	Tally	Total	Opposition
1	Stephen Murray	Burgess	3-08	17	Moyne-Templetuohy
2	Pat Shortt	Upperchurch-Drombane	3-06	15	J. K. Bracken's
2	Eoin Kelly	Mullinahone	0-15	15	Ballina
4	John O'Dwyer	Killenaule	2-08	14	Drom-Inch
4	Seán Curran	Mullinahone	2-08	14	Nenagh Éire Óg
4	Conor Hammersley	Clonoulty-Rossmore	1-11	14	Portroe
7	Michael Breen	Ballina	1-10	13	Silvermines
7	Kieran Morris	Moycarkey-Borris	0-13	13	Carrick Swans
7	Michael Breen	Ballina	0-13	13	Clonakenny
7	John O'Dwyer	Killenaule	0-13	13	Kilruane MacDonaghs

=== Miscellaneous ===
- Kiladangan qualify for the senior final for the first time.
