= 2012 Tipperary Senior Hurling Championship =

Annual hurling competition season

- Dates: 30 June – 14 October 2012
- Teams: 32
- Champions: Thurles Sarsfields (32nd title); Pádraic Maher (captain); Séamus Quinn (manager)
- Runners-up: Drom-Inch; Johnny Ryan (captain); Teddy Kennedy (manager)
- Relegated: Aherlow

Tournament statistics
- Matches played: 34
- Goals scored: 77 (2.26 per match)
- Points scored: 1050 (30.88 per match)
- Top scorer(s): Séamus Callanan (4–42)

The 2012 Tipperary Senior Hurling Championship was the 121st staging of the Tipperary Senior Hurling Championship since its establishment by the Tipperary County Board in 1887. The championship ran from 30 June to 14 October 2012.

Drom & Inch were the defending champions.

The final was played on 14 October 2012 at Semple Stadium in Thurles, between Thurles Sarsfiels and Drom & Inch, in what was their third meeting in the final overall. Thurles Sarsfields won the match by 1–21 to 2–15 to claim their 32nd championship title overall and a first title in two years.

Drom & Inch's Séamus Callanan was the championship's top scorer with 4–42.

== Results ==
=== Round 1 ===
This round featured the 16 teams who failed to qualify for their divisional semi-finalist.

30 June 2012 Round 1	Burgess	1-14 - 0-10	Moycarkey–Borris	The Ragg
	S Murray 1-4, E Hogan 0-4, J Ryan 0-2, J Mulqueen 0-1, T Hogan 0-1, N Gleeson 0-1, B Hogan 0-1.		K Morris 0-5, P Ralph 0-2, R Ryan 0-1, C Clohessy 0-1, P Kelly 0-1.

30 June 2012 Round 1	Kildangan	2-11 - 0-16	Holycross–Ballycahill	The Ragg
	R Whelan 1-2, J Gallagher 0-4, D Egan 1-1, G Slattery 0-2, J Loughnane 0-1, T Gallagher 0-1.		L Dwan 0-5, J Woods 0-4, D Duggan 0-3, J Dwyer 0-2, L McCullagh 0-2.

1 July 2012 Round 1	Lorrha	4-15 - 0-13	Carrick Davins	Páirc Shíleáin
	P Maher 0-6, W Maher 1-1, B Moran 1-1, R O'Meara 1-1, N Hogan 0-3, M O'Meara 1-0, B Fogarty 0-2, C O'Sullivan 0-1.		N Butler 0-4, JJ Butler 0-3, S Butler 0-2, M Coady 0-2, B Butler 0-1, W O'Dwyer 0-1.

1 July 2012 Round 1	Moneygall	1-18 - 2-11	Upperchurch–Drombane	Páirc Shíleáin
	W Greene 0-6, G Kirwan 0-5, P Fanning 1-1, C Ryan 0-2, E McCormack 0-1, E Ryan 0-1, J Troy 0-1, P Troy 0-1.		C Ryan 0-4, J Barry 0-3, P Ryan 0-3, O Shortt 1-0, S Armstrong 1-0, P Greene 0-1.

1 July 2012 Round 1	Roscrea	1-15 - 1-09	Boherlahan–Dualla	Littleton Grounds
	E Flynn 1-3, D Flynn 0-4, J Fitzpatrick 0-4, J Carroll 0-1, P Carroll 0-1, J Bergin 0-1, T Fitzgerald 0-1.		D Hickey 0-7, B Maher 1-0, P Ryan 0-1, F McCullagh 0-1.

2 July 2012 Round 1	Templederry Kenyons	3-23 - 0-10	Golden–Kilfeacle	Drombane Grounds
	E Murray 2-12, P O'Leary 1-7, J Hogan 0-3, G Ryan 0-1.		D Ivers 1-5, J Keane 0-4, D Bargary 0-1.

7 July 2012 Round 1	Borrisokane	0-15 - 0-14	Aherlow	The Ragg
	S Dooley 0-3, S Cleary 0-3, P Austin 0-2, B Reddan 0-2, E Dooley 0-2, P McSharry 0-1, G Harding 0-1, G Power 0-1.		C O'Shea 0-12, L Coskeran 0-1, S Grogan 0-1.

22 July 2012 Round 1	Kilruane MacDonaghs	1-20 - 0-16	Knockavilla–Donaskeigh Kickhams	Templetuohy Grounds
	R McLoughney 1-7, J Cahill 0-7, B O'Meara 0-3, K Quinlan 0-1, T Cleary 0-1, M Costello 0-1.		D Butler 0-4, J Ryan 0-4, P Slattery 0-3, P O'Brien 0-3, D McGrath 0-1, A Horgan 0-1.

=== Round 2 ===
This round featured the eight Round 1 winners and the eight losing divisional semi-finalists.

21 July 2012 Round 2	Lorrha	2-24 - 2-11	Ballingarry	Páirc Shíleáin
	N Hogan 1-5, P Maher 0-6, M O'Meara 1-2, C Hogan 0-3, W Maher 0-2, R O'Meara 0-2, B Fogarty 0-2, B Moran 0-1, C Duggan 0-1.		S Cahill 0-6, C Shelly 1-1, P Ivors 1-0, D Shelly 0-2, A Cleere 0-1, I Ivors 0-1.

22 July 2012 Round 2	Templederry Kenyons	2-15 - 1-17	JK Brackens	Bishop Quinlan Park
	E Murray 1-8, P O'Leary 1-1, T Stapleton 0-1, D Shanahan 0-1, B Stapleton 0-1, P Murray 0-1, P Ryan 0-1, A Ryan 0-1.		S Bourke 1-4, S Scully 0-6, E Fitzpatrick 0-2, E Corcoran 0-2, L Egan 0-1, M Lynagh 0-1, A Doyle 0-1.

29 July 2012 Round 2	Kildangan	2-12 - 0-13	Killenaule	Templetuohy Grounds
	T Gallagher 1-3, T Connors 0-4, D Egan 1-0, J Loughnane 0-1, J Gallagher 0-1, P Kelly 0-1, B Kelly 0-1, G Slattery 0-1.		J O'Dwyer 0-5, P Kerwick 0-3, M Doyle 0-2, P Kennedy 0-1, N Bergin 0-1, C Bergin 0-1.

29 July 2012 Round 2	Borris–Ileigh	0-21 - 0-16	Kilruane MacDonaghs	St Michael's Park
	B Maher 0-11, M Bourke 0-3, D McCormack 0-2, B Harkin 0-2, T Fahy 0-2, V Stapleton 0-1.		R McLoughney 0-8, B O'Meara 0-3, J Cahill 0-3, W Cleary 0-1, K Cahill 0-1.

29 July 2012 Round 2	Drom & Inch	1-14 - 2-07	Moneygall	Bishop Quinlan Park
	S Callanan 0-5, S Butler 0-3, J Ryan 0-3, P Kennedy 1-0, D Butler 0-2, J Woodlock 0-1.		W Greene 0-5, G Kirwan 1-1, E Ryan 1-0, P Troy 0-1.

3 August 2012 Round 2	Cappawhite	0-20 - 2-13	Borrisokane	Lacken Park
	M O'Neill 0-4, E O'Neill 0-4, J O'Neill 0-4, N Hayes 0-2, R Quirke 0-2, K Stapleton 0-1, J Ryan 0-1, P Fitzgerald 0-1, D Heffernan 0-1.		S Dooley 1-8, A Austin 1-0, S Cleary 0-2, G Harding 0-2, P Austin 0-1.

12 August 2012 Round 2	Roscrea	4-13 - 1-09	Cashel King Cormacs	Páirc Shíleáin
	J Bergin 3-4, D Flynn 0-5, E Flynn 1-2, P Carroll 0-2.		J Grogan 1-5, G Slattery 0-1, E Walsh 0-1, T Bonner 0-1, D Fitzell 0-1.

21 August 2012 Round 2	Burgess	2-09 - 0-13	Nenagh Éire Óg	Dolla Grounds
	S Murray 0-6, N Gleeson 1-1, E Hogan 1-0, T Hogan 0-1, J Ryan 0-1.		N Moloney 0-3, K Tucker 0-3, K Gleeson 0-2, T Heffernan 0-2, E Slattery 0-2, M Heffernan 0-1.

=== Round 3 ===
This round featured the eight Round 2 winners in a playoff of four games.

23 August 2012 Round 3	Borris–Ileigh	4-25 - 0-14	Cappawhite	Clonoulty Grounds
	B Maher 1-7, K Ryan 2-1, M Bourke 0-7, V Stapleton 1-2, D McCormack 0-3, C Cowan 0-3, T Kavanagh 0-2.		J O'Neill 0-7, R Quirke 0-2, T Treacy 0-1, N Hayes 0-1, J Ryan 0-1, K Stapleton 0-1, C Creedon 0-1.

26 August 2012 Round 3	Kildangan	0-20 - 0-18	Templederry Kenyons	Dolla Grounds
	R Gleeson 0-8, T Gallagher 0-4, K Loughnane 0-3, J Gallagher 0-2, T Connors 0-1, E Kelly 0-1, R Whelan 0-1.		E Murray 0-5, P O'Leary 0-4, A Ryan 0-4, B Stapleton 0-1, G Ryan 0-1, P Kennedy 0-1, T Ryan 0-1, P Ryan 0-1.

26 August 2012 Round 3	Drom & Inch	0-21 - 0-11	Burgess	Dolla Grounds
	S Callanan 0-9, J Ryan 0-5, J Woodlock 0-2, K Butler 0-2, S Butler 0-1, P Kennedy 0-1, E Buckley 0-1.		S Murray 0-7, T Scroope 0-2, N Gleeson 0-1, D O'Brien 0-1, E Hogan 0-1.

2 September 2012 Round 3	Roscrea	2-12 - 1-14	Lorrha	MacDonagh Park
	D Flynn 1-7, J Carroll 1-1, T Fitzgerlad 0-1, J Bergin 0-1, E Flynn 0-1, J Fitzpatrick 0-1.		P Maher 0-5, N Hogan 1-2, R O'Meara 0-2, W Maher 0-2, C Haugh 0-2, C Hogan 0-1.

=== Round 4 ===
This round featured the four Round 3 winners and the four divisional final losers in a playoff of four games.

15 September 2012 Round 4	Éire Óg Annacarty	1-17 - 0-17	Borris–Ileigh	Leahy Park
	P O'Dwyer 0-6, C O'Brien 0-3, M McGrath 1-0, D O'Brien 0-1, B Fox 0-1, D Hogan 0-1, K Fox 0-1, J Furlong 0-1, D O'Dwyer 0-1, D Mooney 0-1.		B Maher 0-11, B Harkin 0-3, P Stapleton 0-1, M Bourke 0-1, D McCormack 0-1

15 September 2012 Round 4	Drom & Inch	2-19 - 1-13	Carrick Swans	Leahy Park
	S Callanan 1-5, J Ryan 0-5, D Butler 0-5, J Moloney 1-0, P Collins 0-2, J Woodlock 0-1, S Delaney 0-1.		D O'Hanlon 0-8, J Waters 1-0, S Hahessy 0-1, K Walsh 0-1, K Reade 0-1, D Forgarty 0-1, AP Ryan 0-1.

16 September 2012 Round 4	Kildangan	2-19 - 0-15	Toomevara	MacDonagh Park
	T Connors 2-1, T Gallagher 0-5, R Gleeson 0-4, J Gallagher 0-2, H Flannery 0-2, P Kelly 0-2, J Loughnane 0-1, G Slattery 0-1.		W Ryan 0-5, K Dunne 0-5, E Brislane 0-1, J O'Brien 0-1, B McCormack 0-1, C Canning 0-1, M McCarthy 0-1.

16 September 2012 Round 4	Loughmore-Castleiney	1-24 - 2-10	Roscrea	MacDonagh Park
	L McGrath 0-8, C Hennessy 1-4, E Sweeney 0-5, N McGrath 0-4, D Bourke 0-1, E Connolly 0-1, D Kennedy 0-1.		D Flynn 0-5, T Fitzgerald 1-1, J Fitzpatrick 1-0, E Flynn 0-2, J Carroll 0-2.

=== Relegation playoffs ===
This round featured the four teams that lost in the quarter-finals of the Séamus Ó Riain Cup in a playoff of three games.

12 August 2012 Semi-final	Holycross–Ballycahill	2-14 - 1-15	Upperchurch–Drombane	The Ragg
	S Nally 1-1, D Duggan 1-1, J Woods 0-3, L Dwan 0-3, J Dwyer 0-3, P Stakelum 0-1, T Leahy 0-1, D Duggan 0-1.		P Ryan 0-9, J Barry 1-0, P Greene 0-3, C Stapleton 0-1, P Shanahan 0-1, C Ryan 0-1.

12 August 2012 Semi-final	Knockavilla–Donaskeigh Kickhams	0-14 - 0-06	Aherlow	Seán Treacy Park
	P Slattery 0-3, A Horgan 0-2, P O'Brien 0-2, J Ryan 0-2, P Breen 0-2, P O'Dwyer 0-1, D Butler 0-1, C Morrissey 0-1.		P Hennessy 0-2, C O'Shea 0-2, T Hanley 0-1, L Richardson 0-1.

25 August 2012 Final	Upperchurch–Drombane	1-22 - 1-08	Aherlow	St Michael's Park
	P Greene 1-6, P Ryan 0-5, P Shortt 0-4, C Ryan 0-3, P Shanahan 0-2, E Shortt 0-1, C Stapleton 0-1.		C Dillon 1-4, T Hanley 0-2, C O'Shea 0-1, L Richardson 0-1.

=== Quarter-finals ===
This round featured the four Round 4 winners and the four divisional final winners in a playoff of four games.

22 September 2012 Quarter-final	Loughmore-Castleiney	0-22 - 2-11	Mullinahone	Semple Stadium
	N McGrath 0-6, L McGrath 0-4, J McGrath 0-2, C Hennessy 0-2, C McGrath 0-2, L Treacy 0-2, A McGrath 0-2, W Eviston 0-1, E Sweeney 0-1.		E Kelly 2-8, S Curran 0-2, E O'Meara 0-1.

22 September 2012 Quarter-final	Drom & Inch	2-22 - 0-13	Clonoulty–Rossmore	Semple Stadium
	S Callanan 0-7, J Lupton 2-0, D Butler 0-3, P Lupton 0-3, J Ryan 0-3, P Collins 0-2, E Walsh 0-1, J Woodlock 0-1, S Delaney 0-1, K Butler 0-1.		T Hammersley 0-6, F O'Keeffe 0-3, J O'Neill 0-1, J O'Keeffe 0-1, T Butler 0-1, C Hammersley 0-1.

23 September 2012 Quarter-final	Thurles Sarsfields	3-22 - 1-12	Kildangan	Semple Stadium
	P Bourke 1-7, D Maher 1-2, A McCormack 1-2, M O'Brien 0-4, J Enright 0-3, M Cahill 0-1, M Gleeson 0-1, M Corbett 0-1, L Corbett 0-1.		R Gleeson 0-6, J Gallagher 1-1, T Gallagher 0-2, T Connors 0-1, D Egan 0-1, G Slattery 0-1.

23 September 2012 Quarter-final	Éire Óg Annacarty	1-15 - 1-10	Portroe	Semple Stadium
	P O'Dwyer 0-8, R O'Brien 0-4, S Ryan 1-0, K Fox 0-2, D O'Brien 0-1.		J Sheedy 1-4, M Sheedy 0-2, J Ryan 0-1, S O'Brien 0-1, C Leo 0-1, K O'Halloran 0-1.

=== Semi-finals ===
7 October 2012 Semi-final	Thurles Sarsfields	2-22 - 1-13	Éire Óg Annacarty	Semple Stadium
	P Bourke 0-6, D Maher 1-2, J Enright 0-5, A McCormack 1-1, L Corbett 0-4, R Ruth 0-2, P Maher 0-1, M Gleeson 0-1.		P O'Dwyer 0-9, M McGrath 1-0, C O'Brien 0-2, E Kennedy 0-1, D O'Dwyer 0-1.

7 October 2012 Semi-final	Drom-Inch	2-26 - 1-21	Loughmore-Castleiney	Semple Stadium
	S Callanan 2-13, J Ryan 0-5, D Butler 0-3, S Butler 0-3, K Butler 0-1, P Lupton 0-1.		J McGrath 0-10, N McGrath 1-3, A McGrath 0-3, L McGrath 0-3, E Connolly 0-2.

=== Final ===
14 October 2012 Final	Thurles Sarsfields	1-21 - 2-15	Drom-Inch	Semple Stadium
	A McCormack 1-6; P Bourke 0-6 (5f); M Gleeson 0-2; M O’Brien 0-2; J Enright 0-2 (2f); P Maher, D Maher, J Corbett, 0-1 each.	Report	J Ryan 0-9 (2f, 1 65); S Callanan 1-3 (1f); D Butler 1-1; J Woodlock, S Butler, 0-1 each.	Referee: F Horgan (Knockavilla Kickhams)

== Championship statistics ==
=== Top scorers ===
Rank	Player	Club	Tally	Total	Matches	Average
1	Séamus Callanan	Drom & Inch	4-42	54	6	9.00
2	Éanna Murray	Templederry Kenyons	3-25	34	3	11.33
3	Brendan Maher	Borris–Ileigh	1-29	32	3	10.66
4	Johnny Ryan	Drom & Inch	0-30	30	6	5.00
5	Davin Flynn	Roscrea	1-21	24	4	6.00
6	Pádraig O'Dwyer	Éire Óg Annacarty	0-23	23	3	7.66
7	Pa Bourke	Thurles Sarsfields	1-19	22	3	7.33
8	Stephen Murray	Burgess	1-17	20	3	6.66
9	Aidan McCormack	Thurles Sarsfields	3-09	18	3	6.00
9	Ray McLoughney	Kilruane MacDonaghs	1-15	18	2	9.00
9	Tadhg Gallagher	Kildangan	1-15	18	5	3.60
9	Ruairí Gleeson	Kildangan	0-18	18	5	3.60
