= 2015 Tipperary Senior Hurling Championship =

Annual hurling competition season

- Dates: 4 April – 25 October 2015
- Teams: 16
- Sponsor: Clean Ireland Recycling
- Champions: Thurles Sarsfields (34th title); Pádraic Maher (captain); Tommy Maher (manager)
- Runners-up: Nenagh Éire Óg; Noel Maloney (captain); Paddy Murphy (captain); Liam Heffernan (manager)

The 2015 Tipperary Senior Hurling Championship was the 124th staging of the Tipperary Senior Hurling Championship since its establishment by the Tipperary County Board in 1887. The championship ran from 4 April to 25 October 2015.

Thurles Sarsfields enetered the championship as the defending champions.

The final was played on 25 October 2015 at Semple Stadium in Thurles, between Thurles Sarsfields and Nenagh Éire Óg, in what was their first ever meeting in the final. Thurles Sarsfields won the match by 1–18 to 3–11 to claim their 34th championship title overall and a second title in succession.

== Knockout stage ==
=== Preliminary quarter-finals ===
13 September 2025 Pre quarter-final	Nenagh Éire Óg	1-21 - 0-10	Roscrea	St Flannan's Park
	D Quinn 0-9, P Murphy 1-1, S Hennessy 0-4, A Coffey 0-3, P Morris 0-1, T Heffernan 0-1, M Heffernan 0-1, J Mackey 0-1.		J Fitzpatrick 0-7, D Flynn 0-1, M O'Meara 0-1, G Ryan 0-1.

13 September 2025 Pre quarter-final	Éire Óg Annacarty	2-18 - 2-14	Lorrha	The Ragg
	P O'Dwyer 0-9, C O'Brien 1-5, R O'Brien 1-3, K Fox 0-1.		P Maher 0-9, W Maher 1-2, E McIntyre 1-1, C Duggan 0-2.

13 September 2025 Pre quarter-final	Thurles Sarsfields	3-25 - 2-18	Mullinahone	Leahy Park
	P Bourke 1-8, A McCormack 0-8, C Lanigan 1-2, L Corbett 1-1, D Maher 0-2, S Cahill 0-2, J Maher 0-1, B McCarthy 0-1.		S Curran 1-8, J Shelly 1-1, E Kelly 0-4, A Curran 0-2, E Keane 0-1, E Fennelly 0-1, C Horan 0-1.

13 September 2025 Pre quarter-final	Kiladangan	2-16 - 1-10	Upperchurch–Drombane	St Michael's Park
	D Egan 0-6, P Flynn 1-2, W Connors 1-0, A Flynn 0-2, J Loughnane 0-2, M Ryan 0-2, T Gallagher 0-2.		P Ryan 1-4, P Shortt 0-3, J Barry 0-2, P Shanahan 0-1.

13 September 2025 Pre quarter-final	Kilruane MacDonaghs	1-21 - 1-09	J. K. Brackens	St Michael's Park
	B O'Meara 1-4, K Cahill 0-4, C Darcy 0-4, T Cleary 0-3, S Hennessy 0-3, J Cahill 0-2, K Ryan 0-1.		L Fairbrother 0-5, S Bourke 1-1, J Moloney 0-1, L Egan 0-1, C Scully 0-1.

13 September 2015 Pre quarter-final	Portroe	2-26 - 1-20 (aet)	Killenaule	The Ragg
	J Sheedy 0-10, M Gennery 1-1, R Mulrooney 1-1, K O'Halloran 0-4, J Ryan 0-4, J Creamer 0-2, C Leo 0-1, D Gleeson 0-1, M Creamer 0-1, C Gleeson 0-1.		J O'Dwyer 0-9, T Doyle 0-7, D Blake 1-0, N O'Dwyer 0-2, M Doyle 0-1, D O'Connor 0-1.

- Drom-Inch and Clonoulty–Rossmore received byes in this round.

=== Quarter-finals ===
26 September 2015 Quarter-final	Éire Óg Annacarty	1-14 - 1-22	Kilruane MacDonaghs	Semple Stadium
	Paidi O’Dwyer (0-7, 0-6 frees), Kevin Fox (0-1), Conor O’Brien (0-2), Ronan O’Brien (0-3), Dinny Crosse (0-1), Seanie Ryan (1-0)	Report	Eoin Hogan (0-1), Justin Cahill (0-3), Seamus Hennessy (0-3 frees), Kevin Quinlan (0-2), Kieran Cahill (0-8, 0-7 frees), Thomas Cleary (0-1), Brian O’Meara (0-1), Cian Darcy (1-3)	Referee: Johnny Ryan (Boherlahan-Dualla)

26 September 2015 Quarter-final	Kildangan	1-15 - 5-13	Drom-Inch	Semple Stadium
	Darragh Egan (0-8, 0-5 frees, 0-1 65m), Tadhg Gallagher (0-1), Paul Flynn (0-2), Micheal Ryan (1-2), Ruairi Gleeson (0-2)	Report	Johnny Ryan (0-1), Michael Everard (1-1), David Collins (0-3), David Butler (1-0), Seamus Butler (1-2), Seamus Callanan (2-5, 1-0 65m, 0-2 frees), Paul Kennedy (0-1)	Referee: Fergal Horgan (Knockavilla Donaskeigh Kickhams)

27 September 2015 Quarter-final	Nenagh Éire Óg	0-27 - 1-12	Portroe	Semple Stadium
	Daire Quinn (0-1), Michael Heffernan (0-6, 0-4 frees); Andrew Coffey (0-4), Paddy Murphy (0-2), Tommy Heffernan (0-5), Shane Hennessy (0-1), James Mackey (0-8, 0-6 frees)	Report	Jimmy Creamer (1-1), Mark Gennery (0-1), Ruadhan Mulrooney (0-1), Kevin O’Halloran (0-2 sideline cuts), John Sheedy (0-4 frees), James Ryan (0-2), Michael Sheedy (0-1)	Referee: Paddy Ivors (Ballingarry)

27 September 2015 Quarter-final	Clonoulty-Rossmore	1-14 - 1-23	Thurles Sarsfields	Semple Stadium
	Conor Hammersley (0-1), Sean Maher (0-1), Paudie White, John O’Neill (1-1), Timmy Hammersley (0-10, 0-8 frees), Padraig Heffernan (0-1)	Report	Stephen Cahill (0-2), Billy McCarthy (0-1), Lar Corbett (0-2), Aidan McCormack (0-3), Denis Maher (0-1), Conor Lanigan (1-0), Pa Bourke (0-11, 0-3 frees), John Maher (0-3)	Referee: Philip Kelly (Ballinahinch)

=== Semi-finals ===
11 October 2015 Semi-final	Thurles Sarsfields	2-20 - 1-17	Kilruane MacDonaghs	Semple Stadium
	Pa Bourke 1-8 (0-5f), Aidan McCormack 1-6, Denis Maher 0-3, Stephen Cahill 0-2, Lar Corbett 0-1.	Report	Kieran Cahill 0-7 (4f), Cian Darcy 1-0, Seamus Hennessy 0-3 (1f), Ray McLoughney (1f) & Niall O’Meara 0-2 each, Brian O’Meara, Kevin Quinlan & Thomas Cleary 0-1 each.	Referee: John O’Brien (Arravale Rovers)

11 October 2015 Semi-final	Drom-Inch	2-16 - 1-20	Nenagh Éire Óg	Semple Stadium
	Seamus Callanan 1-3 (1-0 pen, 0-3f), David Butler 1-2, Johnny Ryan 0-3 (1f), Seamus Butler 0-2, Kevin Butler, Eamonn Buckley, Enda Walsh, James Woodlock, David Collins & Tommy Nolan 0-1 each.	Report	Mikey Heffernan 0-7 (6f), Andrew Coffey 1-1, Tommy Heffernan 0-4, Daire Quinn, Killian Gleeson & James Mackey (2f) 0-2 each, Barry Heffernan & Paddy Murphy 0-1 each.	Referee: John McCormack (Kickhams)

=== Final ===
25 October 2015 Final	Thurles Sarsfields	1-18 - 3-11	Nenagh Éire Óg	Semple Stadium
	C Lanigan (1-2); P Bourke (0-4, 3 frees, 1 65); Denis Maher (0-4); A McCormack (0-3); L Corbett (0-2); B McCarthy, J Maher, S Cahill (0-1 each).	Report	M Heffernan (1-4, 0-2 frees); A Coffey (1-1); Barry Heffernan (1-0, pen); P Morris, J Mackey (0-2 each); T Heffernan, D Quinn (0-1 each).	Referee: F Horgan (Knockavilla Kickhams)
