= 2010 Tipperary Senior Hurling Championship =

Annual hurling competition season

- Dates: 18 September – 31 October 2010
- Teams: 18
- Champions: Thurles Sarsfields (31st title); Paddy McCormack (captain); Michael Gleeson (manager)
- Runners-up: Clonoulty-Rossmore; Tom Butler (captain); T. J. Ryan (manager)

Tournament statistics
- Matches played: 17
- Goals scored: 39 (2.29 per match)
- Points scored: 509 (29.94 per match)
- Top scorer(s): Darragh Egan (1–22)

The 2010 Tipperary Senior Hurling Championship was the 119th staging of the Tipperary Senior Hurling Championship since its establishment by the Tipperary County Board in 1887. The championship ran from 18 September to 31 October 2010.

Thurles Sarsfields were the defending champions.

The final was played on 31 October 2010 at Semple Stadium in Thurles, between Thurles Sarsfields and Clonoulty-Rossmore, in what was their first ever meeting in the final. Thurles Sarsfields won the match by 1–16 to 1–07 to claim their 31st championship title overall and a second consecutive title.

Kildangan's Darragh Egan was the championship's top scorer with 1–22.

== Results ==
=== First round ===
This round featured the eight beaten divisional semi-finalists and the four beaten divisional finalists in a playoff of six games.

18 September 2010 First round	Galtee/Treacy's	1-13 - 1-09	Carrick Davins	Boherlahan Grounds
	D Byron 1-1, C Bergin 0-3, D Morrissey 0-2, J Ryan 0-2, P Morrissey 0-2, D Stapleton 0-1, M O'Brien 0-1, C Morrissey 0-1.		JJ Butler 1-1, M Cronin 0-3, P Dooley 0-2, W O'Dwyer 0-1, P Harris 0-1, E Power 0-1.

18 September 2010 First round	Upperchurch–Drombane	1-19 - 0-09	Killenaule	Boherlahan Grounds
	P Greene 0-5, J Barry 1-1, J Brennan 0-3, P Shortt 0-3, C Stapleton 0-2, O Shortt 0-2, J Quinn 0-1, C Ryan 0-1, M Ryan 0-1.		J O'Dwyer 0-4, T Doyle 0-3, D Shelly 0-1, M Farrell 0-1.

19 September 2020 First round	Kildangan	3-13 - 1-15	Éire Óg Annacarty	St Michael's Park
	D Egan 1-6, S Kelly 2-1, R Gleeson 0-2, E Gleeson 0-1, P Lynch 0-1, E Kelly 0-1, G Slattery 0-1.		P O'Dwyer 0-7, C O'Brien 0-4, K Fox 1-0, R O'Brien 0-2, E Kennedy 0-1, J Furlong 0-1.

19 September 2020 First round	Burgess	1-20 - 0-15	Holycross–Ballycahill	Bishop Quinlan Park
	S Murray 0-7, N Gleeson 1-2, D Maher 0-3, T Scroope 0-2, S Maher 0-2, T Hogan 0-1, J Ryan 0-1, T Dunne 0-1, D O'Brien 0-1.		D Duggan 0-3, L Dwan 0-3, D Duggan 0-2, R Stakelum 0-2, T Comerford 0-2, P Stakeulm 0-1, J Dunne 0-1, S Lanigan 0-1.

23 September 2010 First round	Borris–Ileigh	1-20 - 0-08	Knockavilla–Donaskeigh Kickhams	Semple Stadium
	B Maher 0-10, B Harkin 1-2, S McCormack 0-3, D O'Connor 0-2, D McCormack 0-1, K Ryan 0-1, M Stapleton 0-1.		J Ryan 0-5, B Horgan 0-1, J Shanahan 0-1, P Comerford 0-1.

23 September 2010 First round	Mullinahone	2-15 - 1-12	Drom & Inch	Semple Stadium
	E Kelly 0-9, S Curran 1-2, K Walzer 1-1, E Carey 0-1, E O'Meara 0-1, C Horan 0-1.		S Butler 0-4, S Callanan 0-4, D Butler 1-0, S Delaney 0-2, Johnny Ryan 0-1, D Collins 0-1.

=== Second round ===
This round featured the six first round winners and the two Séamus Ó Riain Cup finalists in a playoff of four games.

26 September 2010 Second round	Kiladangan	3-15 - 2-13	Galtee/Treacy's	Páirc Shíleáin
	D Egan 0-8, S Kelly 2-0, C Hanrahan 1-0, E Gleeson 0-2, P Lynch 0-2, E Kelly 0-1, T Connors 0-1, G Slattery 0-1.		J Ryan 2-0, T O'Brien 0-5, M O'Brien 0-2, P Morrissey 0-2, D Byron 0-1, P Ryan 0-1, E Ryan 0-1, D Stapleton 0-1.

26 September 2010 Second round	Burgess	1-21 - 0-14	Upperchurch–Drombane	Páirc Shíleáin
	S Murray 0-6, D O'Brien 1-2, D Maher 0-3, N Gleeson 0-3, T Scroope 0-3, T Dunne 0-2, J Mulqueen 0-1, S Maher 0-1.		P Shortt 0-6, P Greene 0-5, O Shortt 0-1, C Stapleton 0-1, P Ryan 0-1.

27 September 2010 Second round	Mullinahone	2-15 - 1-15	Nenagh Éire Óg	Semple Stadium
	S Curran 2-3, E Kelly 0-5, K Bolger 0-2, E O'Meara 0-2, E Carey 0-1, K Waltzer 0-1, E Fennelly 0-1.		K Tucker 0-7, T Heffernan 1-0, P Ryan 0-3, N Moloney 0-2, H Moloney 0-1, M Heffernan 0-1, E Tucker 0-1.

27 September 2010 Second round	Loughmore–Castleiney	1-16 - 1-13	Borris–Ileigh	Semple Stadium
	L McGrath 0-7, N McGrath 1-1, E Sweeney 0-2, J Egan 0-2, T King 0-1, L Treacy 0-1, C Hennessy 0-1, A McGrath 0-1.		B Maher 0-10, D McCormack 1-0, Paul Maher 0-1, P Rabbitte 0-1, Philip Maher 0-1.

=== Quarter-finals ===
This round featured the four second round winners and the four divisional finalists in a playoff of four games.

2 October 2010 Quarter-final	Carrick Swans	1-09 - 1-14	Kildangan	Semple Stadium
	D O'Hanlon 1-6, K Reade 0-1, S Hahessy 0-1, D Fogarty 0-1.		C Hanrahan 0-5, B Kelly 1-0, T Connors 0-2, E Gleeson 0-2, D Egan 0-2, P Kelly 0-1, P Lynch 0-1, S Kelly 0-1.

2 October 2010 Quarter-final	Clonoulty–Rossmore	2-21 - 1-13	Burgess	Semple Stadium
	T Hammersley 1-11, Tom Butler 1-2, F O'Keeffe 0-2, Thomas Butler 0-2, S O'Connor 0-1, P White 0-1, J Forrestal 0-1, C Ryan 0-1.		S Murray 0-5, D O'Brien 1-0, T Scroope 0-2, E Hogan 0-2, N Gleeson 0-2, D Maher 0-1, S Maher 0-1.

3 October 2010 Quarter-final	Toomevara	1-26 - 0-13	Mullinahone	Semple Stadium
	K Dunne 0-8, W Ryan 1-3, D Young 0-3, P O'Brien 0-3, B McCormack 0-3, J O'Brien 0-2, F Devaney 0-2, J Delaney 0-1, M Bevans 0-1.		E Kelly 0-8, K Bolger 0-3, E O'Meara 0-1, P Kelly 0-1.

3 October 2010 Quarter-final	Thurles Sarsfields	2-19 - 2-13	Loughmore–Castleiney	Semple Stadium
	D Maher 0-5, G O'Grady 0-4, J Enright 0-4, L Corbett 1-0, R Ruth 1-0, P Bourke 0-3, A Kennedy 0-1, M Gleeson 0-1, A McCormack 0-1.		L McGrath 1-8, N McGrath 0-4, J Campion 1-0, E Sweeney 0-1.

=== Semi-finals ===
17 October 2010 Semi-final	Clonoulty–Rossmore	1-19 - 1-16	Kiladangan	Semple Stadium
	T Hammersley 0-6, J O'Neill 0-5, F O'Keeffe 1-1, Thomas Butler 0-2, S O'Connor 0-2, J O'Keeffe 0-2, Tom Butler 0-1.		D Egan 0-6, E Gleeson 1-1, G Slattery 0-4, E Kelly 0-2, C Hanrahan 0-1, P Kelly 0-1, R Gleeson 0-1.

17 October 2010 Semi-final	Thurles Sarsfields	1-17 - 1-16	Toomevara	Semple Stadium
	P Bourke 1-6, G O'Grady 0-3, M Gleeson 0-3, L Corbett 0-2, A McCormack 0-1, S Lillis 0-1, R Ruth 0-1.		K Dunne 0-10, E Brislane 1-2, J O'Brien 0-2, F Devaney 0-1, D Young 0-1.

=== Final ===
31 October 2010 Final	Thurles Sarsfields	1-16 - 1-07	Clonoulty–Rossmore	Semple Stadium
	D Maher 0-4; P Bourke 0-4 (frees); L Corbett 1-0; R Ruth 0-2; A McCormack 0-2; J Enright 0-2 (frees); S Lillis 0-2 (0-1 s/l).	Report	J O’Neill 1-1 (1-0 free); Tom Butler 0-3; T Hammersley 0-3 (0-2 frees).

== Championship statistics ==
=== Top scorers ===
Rank	Player	Club	Tally	Total	Matches	Average
1	Darragh Egan	Kildangan	1-22	25	4	6.25
2	Timmy Hammersley	Clonoulty–Rossmore	1-20	23	3	7.66
3	Eoin Kelly	Mullinahone	0-22	22	3	7.33
4	Brendan Maher	Borris–Ileigh	0-20	20	2	10.00
5	Liam McGrath	Loughmore–Castleiney	1-15	18	2	9.00
5	Ken Dunne	Toomevara	0-18	18	2	9.00
5	Stephen Murray	Burgess	0-18	18	3	6.00
8	Pa Bourke	Thurles Sarsfields	1-13	16	3	5.33
9	Seán Kelly	Kildangan	4-02	14	4	3.50
9	Seán Curran	Mullinahone	3-05	14	3	4.66
