= 2014 Tipperary Senior Hurling Championship =

Annual hurling competition season

- Teams: 32
- Sponsor: Clean Ireland Recycling
- Champions: Thurles Sarsfields (33rd title); Pa Bourke (captain); Tommy Maher (manager)
- Runners-up: Loughmore–Castleiney; Noel McGrath (captain); Declan Laffan (manager)

The 2014 Tipperary Senior Hurling Championship was the 123rd staging of the Tipperary Senior Hurling Championship since its establishment by the Tipperary County Board in 1887. The championship began on 12 April 2014 and ended on 2 November 2014.

Loughmore-Castleiney were the defending champions. Thurles Sarsfields won the title following a 2–22 to 3–11 defeat of Loughmore-Castleiney in the final.

== Format ==
The 2014 championship saw a restructuring of the format, with teams graded based on their 2013 Championship performance. 32 teams contested the championship, with teams split into Roinn I and Roinn II.

=== Roinn I ===
In this section sixteen teams were divided into four groups of four. One team from each seeding was chosen per group.

Roinn I

- Seed 1: 4 county semi-finalists from 2013
- Seed 2: 4 county quarter-finalists from 2013
- Seed 3: 4 county Round 4 Losers 2013
- Seed 4: 4 county Round 3 Losers 2013

Progress

The top two teams in each group qualify for the last sixteen. The bottom teams are assigned to Roinn II for the 2015 championship.

=== Roinn II ===
In this section sixteen teams were divided into four groups of four. One team from each seeding was chosen per group.

Roinn II

- Seed 1: 4 Round 2 losers from 2013
- Seed 2: 4 Round 2 losers from 2013
- Seed 3: 4 Round 1 losers from 2013
- Seed 4: 3 Round 1 losers from 2013 plus the 2013 intermediate champions

Progress

The top team in each group qualifies for the last sixteen and are also promoted to Roinn I for 2015. Two out of the last placed teams in each group will be contest the relegation section.

=== Divisional championship ===
Each Tipperary divisional championship in 2014 was operated on a knock-out plus a loser's group format. The four divisional champions will compete in the last sixteen. If a divisional champion also wins Roinn I or Roinn II then the next highest-ranked team progresses.

=== Last sixteen ===
The last sixteen of the championship will feature the four divisional champions, four Roinn II group winners, four Roinn I group winners and four Roinn I second-placed teams.

== Fixtures and results ==
=== Roinn I: Group 1 ===
Pos	Team	Pld	W	D	L	For	Ag.	Diff.	Pts.
1	Nenagh Éire Óg	3	3	0	0	73	45	28	6
2	Clonoulty-Rossmore	3	2	0	1	67	63	4	4
3	Templeder. Kenyons	3	1	0	2	60	67	-7	2
4	Roscrea	3	0	0	3	51	76	-25	0

=== Roinn I: Group 2 ===
Pos	Team	Pld	W	D	L	For	Ag.	Diff.	Pts.
1	Kildangan	3	2	0	1	78	51	27	4
2	Killenaule	3	2	0	1	56	54	2	4
3	Upperch.-Drombane	3	2	0	1	67	67	0	4
4	Carrick Swans	3	0	0	3	46	77	-29	0

=== Roinn I: Group 3 ===
Pos	Team	Pld	W	D	L	For	Ag.	Diff.	Pts.
1	Lough.-Castleiney	3	2	1	0	59	54	5	5
2	Moycarkey-Borris	3	1	1	1	53	59	-6	3
3	Éire Óg Annacarty	3	1	0	2	48	46	2	2
4	Toomevara	3	1	0	2	47	48	-1	2

=== Roinn I: Group 4 ===
Pos	Team	Pld	W	D	L	For	Ag.	Diff.	Pts.
1	Drom-Inch	3	3	0	0	68	48	20	6
2	Borris-Ileigh	3	1	1	1	63	59	4	3
3	Burgess	3	1	1	1	59	58	1	3
4	Silvermines	3	0	0	3	48	73	-25	0

=== Roinn II: Group 1 ===
Pos	Team	Pld	W	D	L	For	Ag.	Diff.	Pts.
1	Lorrha	3	3	0	0	69	50	19	6
2	JK Brackens	3	2	0	1	66	36	30	4
3	Knocka.-Donaskeigh	3	1	0	2	46	62	-16	2
4	Carrick Davins	3	0	0	3	31	64	-33	0

=== Roinn II: Group 2 ===
Pos	Team	Pld	W	D	L	For	Ag.	Diff.	Pts.
1	Kilruane	3	3	0	0	94	37	57	6
2	Holycross-Ballycahill	3	2	0	1	75	61	14	4
3	Boherlahen-Dualla	3	1	0	2	52	64	-12	2
4	Cashel King Cormacs	3	0	0	3	42	101	-59	0

=== Roinn II: Group 3 ===
Pos	Team	Pld	W	D	L	For	Ag.	Diff.	Pts.
1	Ballina	3	2	1	0	52	41	11	5
2	C. J. Kickham's	3	2	0	1	28	29	-1	4
3	Borrisokane	3	1	0	2	33	35	-2	2
4	Ballingarry	3	0	1	2	42	50	-8	1

=== Roinn II: Group 4 ===
Pos	Team	Pld	W	D	L	For	Ag.	Diff.	Pts.
1	Thurles Sarsfields	3	3	0	0	100	19	81	6
2	Portroe	3	2	0	1	58	59	-1	4
3	Cappawhite	3	1	0	2	43	91	-48	2
4	Moneygall	3	0	0	3	49	81	-32	0

=== Relegation play-offs ===
6 September 2014 Semi-final	Ballingarry	5-18 - 0-14	Cashel King Cormacs	Fethard GAA Park
15:00				Referee: J Cleary

6 September 2014 Semi-final	Carrick Davins	0-15 - 3-15	Moneygall	The Ragg
15:00				Referee: J Butler

Final	Cashel King Cormacs	v	Carrick Davins

=== Round of 16 ===
11 October 2014 Round of 16	Clonoulty-Rossmore	3-18 - 1-17	Éire Óg Annacarty	Golden
15:30				Referee: F Horgan

12 October 2014 Round of 16	Loughmore-Castleiney	4-27 - 1-20	Ballina	St. Michael's Park
13:30				Referee: J O'Brien

12 October 2014 Round of 16	Kildangan	3-22 - 2-21	Lorrha	MacDonagh Park
14:00		Report		Referee: J Fitzpatrick

12 October 2014 Round of 16	Moycarkey-Borris	1-17 - 2-19	Templederry Kenyons	Semple Stadium
14:30				Referee: P Ivors

12 October 2014 Round of 16	Borris-Illeigh	2-14 - 0-21	Burgess	St. Michael's Park
15:00		Report		Referee: J Cleary

12 October 2014 Round of 16	Killenaule	0-13 - 1-18	Mullinahone	Clonmel Sportsfield
15:00				Referee: N Cosgrove

12 October 2014 Round of 16	Nenagh Éire Óg	2-14 - 2-8	Kilruane MacDonagh's	MacDonagh Park
15:30		Report		Referee: J Butler

12 October 2014 Round of 16	Drom-Inch	1-20 - 3-17	Thurles Sarsfields	Semple Stadium
16:00		Report		Referee: J Ryan

=== Quarter-finals ===
18 October 2014 Quarter-final	C. J. Kickham's	3-17 3-16	Kildangan	Semple Stadium
15:30				Referee: J Ryan

18 October 2014 Quarter-final	Clonoulty-Rossmore	2-10 - 0-17	Loughmore-Castleiney	Semple Stadium
17:00		Report		Referee: K Delahunty

19 October 2014 Quarter-final	Burgess	0-17 - 0-24	Templederry Kenyons	Semple Stadium
14:30				Referee: P Kelly

19 October 2014 Quarter-final	Thurles Sarsfields	0-20 - 0-19	Nenagh Éire Óg	Semple Stadium
16:00		Report

=== Semi-finals ===
26 October 2014 Semi-final	Thurles Sarsfields	0-18 - 1-11	Templederry Kenyons	Semple Stadium
14:00	A McCormack 0-9; P Bourke (0-4); D Maher, B McCarthy, S Cahill, C Lanigan, M O’Brien (0-1 each);	Report	G Ryan (1-2), A Ryan (0-4), T Ryan, E Murray, D Cary, P O’Leary, T Stapleton (0-1 each)	Referee: G Fitzpatrick

26 October 2014 Semi-final	Loughmore-Castleiney	3-22 - 0-14	C. J. Kickham's	Semple Stadium
15:30	L Treacy and E Sweeney,(1-3 each); J McGrath(1-2); L McGrath, N McGrath, A McGrath, and C Hennessy(0-3 each); T McGrath(0-2).	Report	E Kelly 0-6; C Horan(0-3), J Shelley(0-2), E Fennelly, D Cody, K Bolger (0-1 each)	Referee: F Horgan

=== Final ===
2 November 2014 Final	Thurles Sarsfields	2-22 - 3-11	Loughmore-Castleiney	Semple Stadium
15:30	P Bourke 1-3, Denis Maher, A McCormack 0-5 each, R Ruth 0-4, M O'Brien 1-0, L Corbett 0-2, S Cahill 0-2, C Lanigan 0-1	Report	N McGrath 0-5 (5f), L McGrath, J McGrath 1-1 each, E Sweeney 1-0, L Treacy, C Hennessy, A McGrath (f), L Treacy 0-1 each.	Attendance: 5,731; Referee: J Ryan
