= Michael Keane (hurler) =

Irish hurler

Personal information
- Native name: Mícheál Ó Catháin (Irish)
- Nickname: Blackie
- Born: 1933 Kilkenny, Ireland
- Died: 9 January 2002 (aged 68) Thurles, County Tipperary, Ireland
- Occupation: Telecom employee

Sport
- Sport: Hurling
- Position: Goalkeeper
Club
- Years: Club
- 1951–1968: Thurles Sarsfields
Club titles
	Football	Hurling
Tipperary titles	1	11
Inter-county
- Years: County
- 1955–1957: Tipperary
Inter-county titles
- Munster titles: 0
- All-Irelands: 0
- NHL: 1

Michael Keane (1933 – 9 January 2002) was an Irish hurler. At club level he played with Thurles Sarsfields and was also a member of the Tipperary senior hurling team.

== Career ==
Keane first played hurling at juvenile and underage levels with Thurles Sarsfields. He subsequently progressed onto the club's senior team, with his career coinciding with an unprecedented era of success for the club. Between 1952 and 1965 Keane won 11 Tipperary SHC titles and captained the team in 1960. He also won a Tipperary SFC with Thurles Crokes in 1960. Keane brought his club career to an end after a defeat by Roscrea in the 1968 final.

Keane first played for Tipperary during an unsuccessful season with the minor team in 1951. His progression to the senior team was delayed due to the dominance of Tony Reddin. Keane became Reddin's understudy in 1955 before taking over as first-choice goalkeeper the following year. He was part of Tipperary's successful National League campaign in 1956–57. Keane was replaced as goalkeeper shortly after this victory, however, he later spent a season with the Tipperary junior football team.

== Personal life and death ==
Keane was born in Kilkenny where his father, Con Keane, was a member of the Irish Army. He had played hurling and Gaelic football for Tipperary and was also included on Munster's Railway Cup team. The family later relocated to Thurles, County Tipperary. Keane's brothers, Connie and Larry Keane, also lined out with Tipperary.

Keane died on 9 January 2002, aged 68.

== Honours ==
Thurles Crokes

- Tipperary Senior Football Championship: 1960

Thurles Sarsfields

- Tipperary Senior Hurling Championship: 1952, 1955, 1956, 1957, 1958, 1959, 1961, 1962, 1963, 1964, 1965
- Mid Tipperary Senior Hurling Championship: 1952, 1955, 1956, 1957, 1958, 1959, 1960 (c), 1961, 1962, 1963, 1964, 1965

Tipperary

- National Hurling League: 1956–57
