= Connie Keane =

Irish hurler

Personal information
- Native name: Conchur Ó Catháin (Irish)
- Born: 1930 Kilkenny, Ireland
- Died: 19 December 2010 (aged 80) Thurles, County Tipperary, Ireland

Sport
- Sport: Hurling
- Position: Right wing-back
Club
- Years: Club
- Thurles Sarsfields
Club titles
- Tipperary titles: 6
Inter-county
- Years: County
- 1951-1956: Tipperary
Inter-county titles
- Munster titles: 1
- All-Irelands: 1
- NHL: 2

Cornelius Keane (1930 - 19 December 2010) was an Irish hurler who played as a right wing-back for the Tipperary senior team.

== Career ==
Keane first played hurling at juvenile and underage levels with the Thurles Fennellys club. He subsequently joined the Thurles Sarsfields senior team, with his career coinciding with an unprecedented era of success for the club. Between 1952 and 1959 Keane won six Tipperary SHC titles.

Keane first played for Tipperary during a two-year tenure with the minor team. He won an All-Ireland MHC medal in 1947 after a defeat of Galway in the final. Keane spent two years with the junior team before being drafted onto the senior team in 1951. He was an unused substitute that tear for Tipperary's defeat of Wexford in the All-Ireland final. Keane was off and on the team over the next few years and also added two National League medals to his inter-county honours.

== Personal life and death ==
Keane was born in Kilkenny where his father, Con Keane, was a member of the Irish Army. He had played hurling and Gaelic football for Tipperary and was also included on Munster's Railway Cup team. The family later relocated to Thurles, County Tipperary. Keane's brothers, Larry and Michael, also lined out with Tipperary.

Keane died on 19 December 2010, aged 80.

== Honours ==
Thurles Sarsfields

- Tipperary Senior Hurling Championship: 1952, 1955, 1956, 1957, 1958, 1959,
- Mid Tipperary Senior Hurling Championship: 1950, 1952, 1955, 1956, 1957, 1958, 1959

Tipperary

- All-Ireland Senior Hurling Championship: 1951
- Munster Senior Hurling Championship: 1951
- National Hurling League: 1953-54, 1954–55
- All-Ireland Minor Hurling Championship: 1947
- Munster Minor Hurling Championship: 1947
