= Larry Keane =

Irish hurler

Personal information
- Native name: Labhrás Ó Catháin (Irish)
- Born: 1931 Kilkenny, Ireland
- Died: 16 July 2017 (aged 85) Thurles, County Tipperary, Ireland
- Occupation: Factory employee
- Height: 5 ft 11 in (180 cm)

Sport
- Sport: Hurling
- Position: Right corner-forward
Club
- Years: Club
- Thurles Sarsfields
Club titles
	Football	Hurling
Tipperary titles	1	9
Inter-county
Years	County	Apps (scores)
1954-1958	Tipperary	5 (3-02)
Inter-county titles
- Munster titles: 1
- All-Irelands: 1
- NHL: 2

Laurence Keane (1931 - 16 July 2017) was an Irish hurler. At club level he played with Thurles Sarsfields and was also a member of the Tipperary senior hurling team.

== Career ==
Keane first played hurling at juvenile and underage levels with Thurles Sarsfields. He subsequently progressed onto the club's senior team, with his career coinciding with an unprecedented era of success for the club. Between 1952 and 1963 Keane won nine Tipperary SHC titles, including one as team captain in 1957. He also won a Tipperary SFC title with Thurles Crokes in 1960.

Keane first played for Tipperary during a two-year tenure with the minor team. He won an All-Ireland MHC medal in 1949 after a defeat of Kilkenny in the final. Keane progressed to adult level and was a dual player at junior level. He joined the Tipperary senior hurling team during the team's successful National League campaign in 1954–55. Keane won a second league title two years later before adding a Munster SHC medal to his collection in 1958. Keane lined out at right corner-forward in the 1958 All-Ireland final defeat of Galway.

== Personal life and death ==
Keane was born in Kilkenny where his father, Con Keane, was a member of the Irish Army. He had played hurling and Gaelic football for Tipperary and was also included on Munster's Railway Cup team. The family later relocated to Thurles, County Tipperary. Keane's brothers, Connie and Michael, also lined out with Tipperary.

Keane died on 16 July 2017, aged 85.

== Honours ==
Thurles Crokes

- Tipperary Senior Football Championship: 1960

Thurles Sarsfields

- Tipperary Senior Hurling Championship: 1952, 1955, 1956, 1957 (c), 1958, 1959, 1961, 1962, 1963
- Mid Tipperary Senior Hurling Championship: 1950, 1952, 1955, 1956, 1957, 1958, 1959, 1960, 1961, 1962, 1963

Tipperary

- All-Ireland Senior Hurling Championship: 1958
- Munster Senior Hurling Championship: 1958
- National Hurling League: 1954–55, 1956–57
- All-Ireland Minor Hurling Championship: 1949
- Munster Minor Hurling Championship: 1949
