= Seán McLoughlin (hurler) =

Irish hurler (1935–2025)

Personal information
- Native name: Seán Mac Lochlainn (Irish)
- Nickname: Mac
- Born: 1935 Rahealty, County Tipperary, Ireland
- Died: 1 September 2025 (aged 89) Dooradoyle, Limerick, Ireland
- Occupation: Commercial traveller
- Height: 6 ft 0 in (183 cm)

Sport
- Sport: Hurling
- Position: Left corner-forward
Clubs
- Years: Club
- 1955-1972: Rahealty; Thurles Sarsfields
Club titles
- Tipperary titles: 9
Inter-county
Years	County	Apps (scores)
1958-1969	Tipperary	26 (22-08)
Inter-county titles
- Munster titles: 7
- All-Irelands: 4
- NHL: 2

Seán McLoughlin (1935 – 1 September 2025) was an Irish hurler who played as a left corner-forward for the Tipperary senior team.

== Background ==
Born in Rahealty, County Tipperary, McLoughlin first played competitive hurling during his schooling at Thurles CBS. He arrived on the inter-county scene at the age of sixteen when he first linked up with the Tipperary minor team. He joined the senior panel during the 1958 championship. McLoughlin went on to play a key role during a hugely successful era for the team, and won four All-Ireland medals, seven Munster medals and two National Hurling League medals. He was an All-Ireland runner-up on three occasions.

As a member of the Munster inter-provincial team on a number of occasions, McLoughlin won one Railway Cup medal. At club level he was a ten-time championship medallist with Thurles Sarsfields.

Throughout his career McLoughlin made 26 championship appearances. His retirement came following the conclusion of the 1969 championship.

McLoughlin died on 1 September 2025, at the age of 89.

== Playing career ==
=== Inter-county ===
==== Senior ====
===== Beginnings =====
McLoughlin joined the Tipperary senior team in 1958, however, he remained a peripheral figure on the team for a number of years.

On 17 July 1960, McLoughglin made his senior championship debut in a 6-9 to 2-7 Munster semi-final defeat of reigning champions Waterford. He later won his first Munster medal following a narrow 4-13 to 4-11 defeat of Cork in what has been described as the toughest game of hurling ever played. This victory allowed Tipperary to advance directly to an All-Ireland final meeting with Wexford on 4 September 1960. A certain amount of over-confidence was obvious in the Tipperary camp, particularly in trainer Phil Purcell's comment that no player was capable of marking star forward Jimmy Doyle. The game ended in remarkable circumstances as the crowd invaded the pitch with a minute to go, mistaking the referee's whistle for the end of the game. When the crowd were finally moved off the pitch Tipperary continued playing with only twelve men, but Wexford won on a score line of 2-15 to 0-11. It was McLoughlin's first All-Ireland defeat.

===== Total dominance =====
1961 saw McLoughlin add a second Munster medal to his collection, as old rivals Cork were downed by 3-6 to 0-7. The absence of the All-Ireland semi-final allowed Tipperary to advance directly to the final itself, with Dublin's first native hurling team providing the opposition on 3 September 1961. The game was a close run thing, however, Tipperary held on to win by 0-16 to 1-12. It was McLoughlin's first All-Ireland medal.

In 1962 Tipperary were still the kingpins of Munster. A 5-14 to 2-3 trouncing of Waterford in the decider gave McLoughlin a third successive Munster medal. Tipperary's nemesis of two years earlier, Wexford, waited in Croke Park to test them once again in the subsequent All-Ireland final on 2 September 1962. Wexford, however, were not the force of old and the side got off to possibly the worst start ever by a team in a championship decider. After just ninety seconds the Leinster champions were down by two goals, however, the game turned out to be much closer than people expected. Tipperary eventually secured the win on a score line of 3-10 to 2-11, giving McLoughlin a second All-Ireland medal.

After losing the following year's Munster final to Waterford in one of the hurling shocks of the decade, Tipperary bounced back in 1964. Tipperary later cantered casually past Cork by fourteen points in the provincial decider, giving McLoughlin a fourth Munster medal. The All-Ireland final on 6 September 1964 saw Kilkenny enter the game as firm favourites against Tipperary. John "Mackey" McKenna scored Tipp's first goal after ten minutes as the Munster champions took a 1-8 to 0-6 interval lead. The second half saw Tipperary score goals for fun, with Donie Nealon getting a hat-trick and McLoughlin another. Kilkenny were humiliated at the full-time whistle as Tipperary triumphed by 5-13 to 2-8. It was McLoughlin's third All-Ireland medal.

In 1965 McLoughlin won a first National Hurling League medal as New York were narrowly defeated on an aggregate score of 6-19 to 5-20. Tipperary demolished all opposition in the provincial championship once again and a 4-11 to 0-5 trouncing of Cork gave him a fifth Munster medal. Wexford were Tipperary's opponents in the subsequent All-Ireland final on 5 September 1965, however, the game failed to live up to the two classic games between the two sides in 1960 and 1962. Victory went to Tipperary on that occasion by 2-16 to 0-10, courtesy of a brace of goals by McLoughlin. The win gave him a fourth All-Ireland medal.

===== Decline =====
After surrendering their provincial crown in 1966, Tipperary bounced back the following year, with McLoughlin winning a seventh Munster medal following a 4-12 to 2-6 defeat of Clare. 3 September 1967 saw Kilkenny face Tipperary in the All-Ireland decider. Tipperary looked like continuing their hoodoo over their near rivals as they took a 2-6 to 1-3 lead at half-time. Goalkeeper Ollie Walsh was the hero for Kilkenny as he made a series of spectacular saves, however, the team lost Eddie Keher and Tom Walsh to injury in the second half. In spite of this, Kilkenny laid to rest a bogey that Tipperary had over the team since 1922, and a 3-8 to 2-7 victory resulted in defeat for McLoughlin's team.

McLoughlin won a second National League medal in 1968 as New York were defeated on an aggregate score of 6-27 to 4-22. Tipperary retained their status as provincial kingpins once again and a 2-13 to 1-7 trouncing of Cork gave McLoughlin a seventh Munster medal. For the fourth time of the decade, Wexford were Tipperary's opponents in the subsequent All-Ireland final on 1 September 1968. At half-time it looked as if Tipperary were cruising to another victory as they took an eight-point lead. Just after the restart Wexford had a Christy Jacob goal disallowed before Tony Doran scored a goal after just six minutes. Tipperary fought back, however, it was too late as Wexford won by 5-8 to 3-12.

On 27 July 1969, McLoughlin played his last game for Tipperary in a 4-6 to 0-9 Munster final defeat by Cork.

== Honours ==
Thurles Sarsfields

- Tipperary Senior Hurling Championship: 1956, 1957, 1958, 1959, 1961, 1962, 1963, 1964, 1965
- Mid Tipperary Senior Hurling Championship: 1956, 1957, 1958, 1959, 1960, 1961, 1962, 1963, 1964, 1965, 1968, 1969
- Tipperary Junior Hurling Championship: 1955
- Mid Tipperary Junior Hurling Championship: 1955

Tipperary

- All-Ireland Senior Hurling Championship: 1961, 1962, 1964, 1965
- Munster Senior Hurling Championship: 1960, 1961, 1962, 1964, 1965, 1967, 1968
- National Hurling League: 1964–65, 1967–68
- All-Ireland Minor Hurling Championship: 1952, 1953
- Munster Minor Hurling Championship: 1952, 1953

Munster

- Railway Cup: 1966

Sporting positions
Preceded by Jimmy Doyle	Tipperary Senior Hurling Captain; 1963	Succeeded by Mick Murphy
