= 1912 Tipperary Senior Hurling Championship =

Annual hurling competition season

- Champions: Toomevara (3rd title)
- Runners-up: Tipperary O'Leary's

The 1912 Tipperary Senior Hurling Championship was the 23rd staging of the Tipperary Senior Hurling Championship since its establishment by the Tipperary County Board in 1887.

Thurles were the defending champions.

Toomevara won the championship after a 6–04 to 0–01 defeat of Tipperary O'Leary's. It was their third championship title overall and their first title since 1910.
