= Fergal Heaney =

Irish hurler (born 1978)

Personal information
- Native name: Fearghal Ó hÉanna (Irish)
- Born: 16 April 1978 (age 48) Dundrum, County Tipperary, Ireland
- Height: 6 ft 1 in (185 cm)

Sport
- Sport: Hurling
- Position: Full-back
Club
- Years: Club
- Knockavilla–Donaskeigh Kickhams
Club titles
- Tipperary titles: 0
Inter-county
| Years | County | Apps (scores) |
| 1999-2000 | Tipperary | 3 (0-00) |
Inter-county titles
- Munster titles: 0
- All-Irelands: 0
- NHL: 1
- All Stars: 0

Fergal Heaney (born 16 April 1978) is an Irish former hurler. At club level, he played with Knockavilla–Donaskeigh Kickhams and at inter-county level with the Tipperary senior hurling team.

== Playing career ==
At club level, Heaney first played with Knockavilla–Donaskeigh Kickhams at juvenile and underage levels, before progressing to adult level. He won West Tipperary SHC titles in 1997 and 1999.

Heaney first appeared on the inter-county scene with Tipperary at minor level. He won a Munster MHC medal, as well as being full-back on the team that won the All-Ireland MHC title in 1996. His subsequent three seasons with the under-21 team ended with a Munster U21HC medal in 1999. Heaney later spent two seasons with the senior team and was part of their National Hurling League-winning team in 1999.

== Honours ==
Knockavilla–Donaskeigh Kickhams

- West Tipperary Senior Hurling Championship (2): 1997, 1999

Tipperary

- National Hurling League (1): 2001
- Munster Under-21 Hurling Championship (1): 1999
- All-Ireland Minor Hurling Championship (1): 1996
- Munster Minor Hurling Championship (1): 1996
