= 1929 Tipperary Senior Hurling Championship =

Annual hurling competition season

- Champions: Thurles Sarsfields (8th title); Jack Stapleton (captain)
- Runners-up: Toomevara

The 1929 Tipperary Senior Hurling Championship was the 38th staging of the Tipperary Senior Hurling Championship since its establishment by the Tipperary County Board in 1887.

Boherlahan were the defending champions.

Thurles Sarsfields won the championship after a 4–03 to 1–03 defeat of Toomevara in the final. It was their eighth championship title overall and their first title since 1911.

== Results ==
=== Semi-final ===
18 August 1929 Semi-final	Thurles Sarsfields	3-02 - 3-00	Boherlahan	Littleton Grounds

=== Final ===
15 September 1929 Final	Thurles Sarsfields	4-03 - 1-03	Toomevara	Borrisoleigh Grounds
