= 2012 All-Ireland Intermediate Hurling Championship =

Championship Details
- Dates: 26 May 2012 – 1 September 2012
- Teams: 8

All Ireland Champions
- Winners: Tipperary (6th win)
- Captain: Eddie Connolly
- Manager: Michael Ryan

All Ireland Runners-up
- Runners-up: Kilkenny
- Captain: Robbie Walsh
- Manager: Pat O'Grady

Provincial Champions
- Munster: Tipperary
- Leinster: Kilkenny
- Ulster: Not Played
- Connacht: Not Played

Championship Statistics
- Matches Played: 7
- Total Goals: 27 (3.8 per game)
- Total Points: 225 (32.1 per game)
- Top Scorer: Rory Hickey (1-28)

The 2013 All-Ireland Intermediate Hurling Championship was the 29th staging of the All-Ireland hurling championship since its establishment by the Gaelic Athletic Association in 1961. The championship began on 26 May 2012 and ended on 1 September 2012.

Clare were the defending champions, however, they were defeated in the provincial final. Tipperary won the title following a 3–13 to 1–17 defeat of Kilkenny in the final.

== Team summaries ==
Team	Colours	Most recent success	
Team	Colours	All-Ireland	Provincial
Clare	Saffron and blue	2011	2011
Cork	Red and white	2009	2010
Galway	Maroon and white	2002	2008
Kilkenny	Black and amber	2010	2011
Limerick	Green and white	1998	2008
Tipperary	Blue and gold	2000	2002
Waterford	White and blue		2007
Wexford	Purple and gold	2007	2007

== Results ==
=== Leinster Intermediate Hurling Championship ===
28 June 2012 Final	Wexford	2-14 - 3-20	Kilkenny	Wexford Park
	T Dwyer (1-5), P Doran (1-3), L Og McGovern (0-2), S O'Gorman (0-1), M Lillis (0-1), J Breen (0-1), E Quigley (0-1).	Report	R Hickey (1-7), W Walsh (1-2), R Walsh (1-0), N Walsh (0-3), G Aylward (0-2), C Kenny (0-2), P Murphy (0-2), J Lyng (0-1), J Brennan (0-1).	Referee: J Keenan (Wicklow)

=== Munster Intermediate Hurling Championship ===
26 May 2012 Quarter-final	Tipperary	2-20 - 1-11	Limerick	MacDonagh Park
	S Carey 1-3, K Morris 0-5 (3fs), R Ruth 0-4, D Butler 1-1, P White, D O’Brien 0-2 each, E Sweeney, J Ryan, J Sheedy 0-1 each.	Report	J Fitzgibbon 0-3, E Gleeson 1-0, E Ryan, R O’Donnell (2fs), M Ryan 0-2 each, M Deegan, W Griffin 0-1 each.	Referee: C Lyons (Cork)

17 June 2012 Semi-final	Clare	1-19 - 3-9	Waterford	Semple Stadium
	T Kelly 1-3 (1-1f), D O’Halloran 0-6 (1f), C O’Connell 0-4 (2f), C O’Doherty 0-2 (1f, 1 65), C Malone, C Ryan, F Kennedy & M O’Neill 0-1 each.	Report	G Crotty 1-1, F Murray 0-4 (3f), J Dillon & E Murphy 1-0 each, J Prendergast, S Lawlor, B O’Halloran & R Barry 0-1 each.	Referee: D Copps (Cork)

24 June 2012 Semi-final	Cork	2-16 - 3-18	Tipperary	Páirc Uí Chaoimh
	A Mannix 0-9 (0-2f), S Harnedy 1-2, C Casey 1-1, Michael O’Sullivan 0-2, D Drake, O Kelleher 0-1 each.	Report	K Morris 0-6 (0-4f, 0-1 65), S Carey, D Butler 1-3 each, M Heffernan 0-4, J Gallagher 1-0, M Gleeson 0-2.	Referee: D O'Driscoll (Limerick)

25 July 2012 Final	Tipperary	1-18 - 0-17	Clare	MacDonagh Park
	K Morris 0-8 (8f); D Butler 1-4; M Heffernan 0-2; D O’Brien 0-2; M Gleeson, P White, 0-1 each.	Report	C O’Connell 0-7 (5f, 1 65); P Sheehan 0-3; P Duggan 0-2; C Malone 0-2; C Duggan, F Kennedy, D O’Halloran, 0-1 each.	Referee: D Kirwan (Cork)

=== All-Ireland Intermediate Hurling Championship ===
18 August 2012 Semi-final	Galway	1-13 - 0-21	Kilkenny	O'Connor Park
	N. Healy 1-8 (1-6 frees), P. Mannion 0-3, B. Burke 0-2.	Report	R. Hickey 0-13 frees, P. Murphy 0-2, G. Brennan, K. Kelly, R. Walsh, JJ Farrell, G. Aylward, M. Malone 0-1 each.

1 September 2012 Final	Tipperary	3-13 - 1-17	Kilkenny	Semple Stadium
	M Heffernan 1-4, K Morris 1-3 (0-1f), D Butler 1-2, M Gleeson, P White, S Carey, P O’Dwyer 0-1 each.	Report	R Hickey 0-8 (4f, 2 65s), G Brennan 1-0, K Kelly 0-3, N Walsh 0-2, B Kennedy, L Harney, J Lyng, JJ Farrell 0-1 each.	Referee: J Owens (Wexford)

== Statistics ==
=== Top scorers ===
Overall

Rank	Player	County	Tally	Total	Matches	Average
1	Rory Hickey	Kilkenny	1-28	31	3	10.33
2	Kieran Morris	Tipperary	1-22	25	4	6.25
3	Mikey Heffernan	Tipperary	1-10	13	4	3.25
4	Niall Healy	Galway	1-8	11	1	11.00
4	Cathal O'Connell	Clare	0-11	11	2	5.60

Single game

Rank	Player	County	Tally	Total	Opposition
1	Rory Hickey	Kilkenny	0-13	13	Galway
2	Niall Healy	Galway	1-8	11	Kilkenny
3	Rory Hickey	Kilkenny	1-7	10	Wexford
4	Adrian Mannix	Cork	0-9	9	Tipperary
5	Tommy Dwyer	Wexford	1-5	8	Kilkenny
5	Kieran Morris	Tipperary	0-8	8	Clare
5	Rory Hickey	Kilkenny	0-8	8	Tipperary
8	David Butler	Tipperary	1-4	7	Clare
8	Mikey Heffernan	Tipperary	1-4	7	Kilkenny
8	Cathal O'Connell	Clare	0-7	7	Tipperary

=== Scoring ===
- First goal of the championship
  - David Butler for Tipperary against Limerick (Munster quarter-final)
- Widest winning margin: 12 points
  - Tipperary 2-20 - 1-11 Limerick (Munster quarter-final)
- Most goals in a match: 5
  - Tipperary 3-18 - 2-16 Cork (Munster semi-final)
- Most points in a match: 37
  - Tipperary 1-18 - 0-17 Clare (Munster final)
- Most goals by one team in a match: 3
  - Kilkenny 3-20 - 2-14 Wexford (Leinster final)
  - Tipperary 3-18 - 2-16 Cork (Munster semi-final)
  - Waterford 3-9 - 1-19 Clare (Munster semi-final)
  - Tipperary 3-13 - 1-17 Kilkenny (All-Ireland final)
- Highest aggregate score: 49
  - Kilkenny 3-20 - 2-14 Wexford (Leinster final)
  - Tipperary 3-18 - 2-16 Cork (Munster semi-final)
- Most goals scored by a losing team: 3
  - Waterford 3-9 - 1-19 Clare (Munster semi-final
