= John Farrell (hurler) =

Irish hurler (born 1961)

Personal information
- Native name: Seán Ó Fearail (Irish)
- Born: 1961 (age 64–65) Dundrum, County Tipperary, Ireland

Sport
- Sport: Hurling
- Position: Goalkeeper
Club
- Years: Club
- Knockavilla–Donaskeigh Kickhams
Club titles
- Tipperary titles: 0
Inter-county*
Years	County	Apps (scores)
1982-1984	Tipperary	0 (0-00)
Inter-county titles
- Munster titles: 0
- All-Irelands: 0
- NHL: 0
- All Stars: 0
- *Inter County team apps and scores correct as of 22:49, 4 September 2014.

John Farrell (born 1961) is an Irish retired hurler who played as a goalkeeper for the Tipperary senior team.

Born in Dundrum, County Tipperary, Farrell first arrived on the inter-county scene at the age of seventeen when he first linked up with the Tipperary minor team before later joining the under-21 side. He made his senior debut during the 1982 championship. Farrell went on to enjoy a brief career.

At club level Farrell won numerous divisional championship medals as a hurler and a Gaelic footballer with Knockavilla–Donaskeigh Kickhams.

Throughout his career Farrell made 1 championship appearance for Tipperary. His retirement came following the conclusion of the 1984 championship.

== Honours ==
=== Player ===
Tipperary

- All-Ireland Under-21 Hurling Championship (1): 1981
- Munster Under-21 Hurling Championship (1): 1981
