= Tom Ryan (Toomevara hurler) =

Irish hurler

Personal information
- Native name: Tomás Ó Riain (Irish)
- Born: 1941 Toomevara, County Tipperary, Ireland
- Died: 17 March 1970 (aged 29) Toomevara, County Tipperary, Ireland
- Occupation: Farmer

Sport
- Sport: Hurling
- Position: Right corner-forward
Club
- Years: Club
- 1959-1970: Toomevara
Club titles
- Tipperary titles: 1
Inter-county
- Years: County
- 1961-1966: Tipperary
Inter-county titles
- Munster titles: 2
- All-Irelands: 2
- NHL: 1

Thomas J. Ryan (1941 - 17 March 1970) was an Irish hurler. At club level he played with Toomevara and was also a member of the Tipperary senior hurling team.

== Career ==
Ryan first played hurling at juvenile and underage level with the Toomevara club. He eventually progressed onto the club's senior team and won three successive North Tipperary SHC titles as well as a Tipperary SHC title in 1960.

Ryan first appeared on the inter-county scene during a two-year tenure with the Tipperary minor hurling team. He ended his underage career by winning an All-Ireland MHC medal after a one-point win over Kilkenny in the 1959 All-Ireland minor final. Ryan joined the senior team training panel in 1961. He won his first All-Ireland SHC medal after coming on as a substitute for Jimmy Doyle in the 1962 All-Ireland final defeat of Wexford. Ryan was dropped from the team for the next two years but returned as part of the 1964-65 National League-winning side. He later won a second All-Ireland medal as a non-playing substitute after another defeat of Wexford in the 1965 All-Ireland final.

== Death ==
Ryan died from Hodgkin's disease on 17 March 1970, aged 29. His brother, Roger Ryan, won an All-Ireland medal with Tipperary in 1971.

== Honours ==
Toomevara

- Tipperary Senior Hurling Championship: 1960
- North Tipperary Senior Hurling Championship: 1960, 1961, 1962

Tipperary

- All-Ireland Senior Hurling Championship: 1962, 1965
- Munster Senior Hurling Championship: 1962, 1965
- National Hurling League: 1964-65
- All-Ireland Minor Hurling Championship: 1959
- Munster Minor Hurling Championship: 1959
