= Brendan Carroll (hurler) =

Irish hurler

Personal information
- Native name: Breandán Ó Cearbhaill (Irish)
- Born: 18 November 1970 (age 55) Thurles, County Tipperary, Ireland
- Occupation: Managing director
- Height: 6 ft 2 in (188 cm)

Sport
- Sport: Hurling
- Position: Left wing-back
Club
- Years: Club
- Thurles Sarsfields
Club titles
- Tipperary titles: 1
College
- Years: College
- University College Dublin
College titles
- Fitzgibbon titles: 1
Inter-county
Years	County	Apps (scores)
1994-1997	Tipperary	5 (0-00)
Inter-county titles
- Munster titles: 0
- All-Irelands: 0
- NHL: 0
- All Stars: 0

Brendan Carroll (born 18 November 1970) is an Irish businessman and retired hurler who played as a left wing-back for the Tipperary senior team.

Carroll joined the team during the 1993-94 National League and was a regular member of the team for just four seasons. During that time he failed to claim any honours at senior level.

At club level Carroll is a one-time county club championship medalist with Thurles Sarsfields.

Carroll is co-founder and managing director of recruitment company e-Frontiers. Prior to setting up e-Frontiers, Brendan worked at VISION Consulting for over 11 years having joined as a graduate. With VISION Consulting he delivered IT consultancy expertise from programming, analysis, business design through to project and programme management across numerous industry sectors including financial services, insurance, telecoms and sports/entertainment.

Carroll holds a B.Comm (UCD), MBS (Smurfit School of Business - UCD) and a Diploma in IT (NUI Maynooth).

== Honours ==
University College Dublin

- Fitzgibbon Cup (1): 1993

Thurles Sarsfields

- Tipperary Senior Hurling Championship (1): 2005

Tipperary

- Munster Under-21 Hurling Championship (1): 1990
