= Brendan Carroll =

Brendan Carroll may refer to:

- Brendan Carroll (footballer) (died 2007), Irish football player
- Brendan Carroll (hurler) (born 1970), Irish retired hurler

== See also ==
- Brendan O'Carroll (born 1955), Irish writer, comedian, actor and director
