= 1960 Tipperary Senior Hurling Championship =

Annual hurling competition season

- Dates: 11 September – 16 October 1960
- Teams: 8
- Champions: Toomevara (10th title); Billy O'Donovan (captain)
- Runners-up: Thurles Sarsfields; Michael Keane (captain)

Tournament statistics
- Matches played: 6
- Goals scored: 40 (6.67 per match)
- Points scored: 102 (17 per match)

The 1960 Tipperary Senior Hurling Championship was the 69th staging of the Tipperary Senior Hurling Championship since its establishment by the Tipperary County Board in 1887. The championship ran from 11 September to 16 October 1960.

Thurles Sarsfields were the defending champions.

The final was played on 16 October 1960 at Páirc Shíleáin in Templemore, between Toomevara and Thurles Sarsfields, in what was their second meeting in the final in three years. Toomevara won the match by 3–15 to 2–08 to claim their 10th championship title overall and a first title in 29 years.

== Format change ==
A proposal by the county board secretary that both the winners and runners-up from each of the four divisions take part in the county series of games was adopted. This increased the number of participating teams to eight, while also providing an extra round of games.

== Qualification ==
Championship	Champions	Runners-up
Mid Tipperary Senior Hurling Championship	Thurles Sarsfields	Holycross–Ballycahill
North Tipperary Senior Hurling Championship	Toomevara	Kilruane MacDonaghs
South Tipperary Senior Hurling Championship	Marlfield	Carrick Swans
West Tipperary Senior Hurling Championship	Knockavilla–Donaskeigh Kickhams	Solohead

== Results ==
=== Quarter-finals ===
11 September 1960 Quarter-final	Thurles Sarsfields	10-14 - 1-02	Carrick Swans	Clonmel GAA Ground

25 September 1960 Quarter-final	Toomevara	3-20 - 1-06	Solohead	Thurles Sportsfield

25 September 1960 Quarter-final	Kilruane MacDonaghs	8-08 - 1-04	Marlfield	Thurles Sportsfield

25 September 1960 Quarter-final	Holycross–Ballycahill	w/o - scr.	Knockavilla–Donaskeigh Kickhams

=== Semi-finals ===
2 October 1960 Semi-final	Thurles Sarsfields	2-10 - 2-04	Holycross–Ballycahill	Thurles Sportsfield

2 October 1960 Semi-final	Toomevara	3-09 - 4-02	Kilruane MacDonaghs	St Cronan's Park

=== Final ===
16 October 1960 Final	Toomevara	3-15 - 2-08	Thurles Sarsfields	Páirc Shíleáin
	T Ryan 0-8, J Donovan 1-1, W Donovan 1-0, F Ryan 1-0, P Shanahan 0-3, C Ryan 0-2, M O'Gara 0-1.		J Doyle 1-3, S McLoughlin 1-1, T Walsh 0-2, P Doyle 0-1, M Murphy 0-1.	Referee: J Stapleton (Solohead)
