= 1961 Tipperary Senior Hurling Championship =

Annual hurling competition season

- Dates: 10 September – 15 October 1961
- Teams: 6
- Champions: Thurles Sarsfields (23rd title); Martin Maher (captain)
- Runners-up: Toomevara; John Haugh (captain)

Tournament statistics
- Matches played: 6
- Goals scored: 40 (6.67 per match)
- Points scored: 85 (14.17 per match)
- Top scorer(s): Larry Keane (4–05)

The 1961 Tipperary Senior Hurling Championship was the 70th staging of the Tipperary Senior Hurling Championship since its establishment by the Tipperary County Board in 1887. The championship ran from 10 September to 15 October 1961.

Toomevara were the defending champions.

The final was played on 15 October 1961 at Páirc Shíleáin in Templemore, between Thurles Sarsfields and Toomevara, in what was their third meeting in the final in four years. Thurles Sarsfields won the match by 3–04 to 0–09 to claim their 23rd championship title overall and a first championship title in two years.

Larry Keane was the championship's top scorer with 4–05.

== Qualification ==
Championship	Champions	Second team
Mid Tipperary Senior Hurling Championship	Thurles Sarsfields	Holycross–Ballycahill
North Tipperary Senior Hurling Championship	Toomevara	Borrisokane
South Tipperary Senior Hurling Championship	Killenaule	n/a
West Tipperary Senior Hurling Championship	St Vincent's	n/a

== Results ==
=== Quarter-finals ===
10 September 1961 Quarter-final	Holycross–Ballycahill	5-12 - 6-05	St Vincent's	Leahy Park
	J Spillane 3-3, J Ryan 1-2, D Dwyer 1-2, J Doyle 0-3, P Stakelum 0-2.		M Gleeson 2-1, P Corbett 2-0, TJ McGrath 1-2, D O'Neill 1-0, S Ryan 0-1, L Kelly 0-1.

10 September 1961 Quarter-final	Borrisokane	2-08 - 2-01	Killenaule	Thurles Sportsfield
	J McKenna 0-4, P White 1-1, S Gardiner 1-0, J Quirke 0-1, Slevin 0-1, V McKenna 0-1.		M O'Meara 1-1, L Fanning 1-0.

=== Semi-finals ===
17 September 1961 Semi-final	Toomevara	2-11 - 2-06	Holycross–Ballycahill	MacDonagh Park
	T Ryan 0-4, P Shanahan 1-0, F Ryan 1-0, M O'Gara 0-3, J Donovan 0-2, W DOnovan 0-1, G Hough 0-1.		P Stakeulm 0-5, J Spillane 1-1, J Ryan 1-0.

17 September 1961 Semi-final	Thurles Sarsfields	5-05 - 3-11	Borrisokane	MacDonagh Park
	L Keane 2-2, S McLoughlin 2-0, K Houlihan 1-1, M Maher 0-2.		J McKenna 1-5, J Quigley 1-1, P White 1-1, S Fogarty 0-1, P Hogan 0-1, V McKenna 0-1, R Slevin 0-1.

1 October 1961 Semi-final replay	Thurles Sarsfields	7-09 - 3-04	Borrisokane	MacDonagh Park
	P Dorney 3-3, S McLoughlin 2-1, L Keane 1-2, P Doyle 1-0, K Houlihan 0-1, T Walsh 0-1, M Maher 0-1.		J McKenna 1-1, S Fogarty 1-1, J Quigley 1-0, T McKenna 0-2.

=== Final ===
15 October 1961 Final	Thurles Sarsfields	3-04 - 0-09	Toomevara	Páirc Shíleáin
	K Houlihan 2-0, L Keane 1-1, M Maher 0-1, T Wall 0-1, P Doyle 0-1.		M O'Gara 0-5, W O'Donovan 0-2, P Shanahan 0-2.

== Championship statistics ==
=== Top scorers ===
Rank	Player	Club	Tally	Total	Matches	Average
1	Larry Keane	Thurles Sarsfields	4-05	17	3	5.66
2	John Spillane	Holycross–Ballycahill	4-04	16	2	8.00
2	John McKenna	Borrisokane	2-10	16	3	5.33
4	Seán McLoughlin	Thurles Sarsfields	4-01	13	3	4.33
5	Patsy Dorney	Thurles Sarsfields	3-03	12	3	4.00

=== Miscellaneous ===
- The final between Thurles Sarsfields and Toomevara was to be played on 8 October 1961, however, the game was postponed due to the death of Toomevara player Jerh Hough.
- Thurles Sarsfields player Mickey Byrne set a new record by becoming the first player to win 10 championship medals.
