= 1911 Tipperary Senior Hurling Championship =

Annual hurling competition season

- Champions: Thurles (7th title)
- Runners-up: Toomevara

The 1911 Tipperary Senior Hurling Championship was the 22nd staging of the Tipperary Senior Hurling Championship since its establishment by the Tipperary County Board in 1887.

Toomevara were the defending champions.

Thurles won the championship after a 4–05 to 1–00 defeat of Toomevara in the final. It was their seventh championship title overall and their first title since 1909.
