= John O'Grady (hurler) =

Tipperary hurler

Personal information
- Native name: Seán Ó Gráda (Irish)
- Born: 14 January 1931 Littleton, County Tipperary, Ireland
- Died: December 6, 2024 (aged 93) Cashel
- Occupation: Secondary school deputy principal
- Height: 5 ft 9 in (175 cm)

Sport
- Sport: Hurling
- Position: Goalkeeper
Clubs
- Years: Club
- Moycarkey–Borris; University College Cork; Blackrock
Club titles
- Tipperary titles: 0
College
- Years: College
- 1949–1953: University College Cork
College titles
- Fitzgibbon titles: 0
Inter-county
Years	County	Apps (scores)
1958	Tipperary	5 (0–00)
Inter-county titles
- Munster titles: 1
- All-Irelands: 1
- NHL: 0

John O'Grady (14 January 1931 - 6 December 2024) was an Irish former hurler. At club level he played with Moycarkey–Borris, University College Cork and Blackrock and was also a member of the Tipperary senior hurling team.

== Career ==
O'Grady first played hurling at club level with Moycarkey–Borris and joined the club's senior team as a 16-year-old. He also lined out with Thurles CBS in the Harty Cup and earned selection on the Munster Colleges team. As a university student in Cork, O'Grady played in the Fitzgibbon Cup with University College Cork and also earned inclusion on the Combined Universities team in 1952 and 1953. After leaving university he played with the Blackrock club in Cork, lining out in the 1954 final defeat by Glen Rovers, before ending his career with Moycarkey–Borris in 1962.

O'Grady first played for Tipperary during a three-year tenure as goalkeeper with the minor team. He won his first All-Ireland MHC medal in 1947 before captaining the team to the title two years later in 1949. O'Grady's progress to the senior team was delayed due to the dominance of Tony Reddin in the position, however he lined out in a tournament game with Cork in 1953. After Reddin's retirement in 1957, O'Grady impressed in a series of club games and inter-county trials and was called up to the team in 1958. Later that year he won a Munster SHC medal before lining out in goal in the 1958 All-Ireland final defeat of Galway. An eyesight issue brought an end to his inter-county career shortly afterwards.

== Personal life ==
Following his graduation from University College Cork, O'Grady worked as a secondary school teacher at Sullivan's Quay CBS. He took a teaching post in Thurles CBS in 1955 and remained there until his retirement as deputy principal in 1992. For over 60 years O'Grady wrote a hurling column in the Tipperary Star under the pen name "Cúlbáire".

== Honours ==
Thurles CBS

- Dean Ryan Cup: 1947

Tipperary

- All-Ireland Senior Hurling Championship: 1958
- Munster Senior Hurling Championship: 1958
- All-Ireland Minor Hurling Championship: 1949 (c)
- Munster Minor Hurling Championship: 1947, 1949 (c)

Achievements
Preceded by Mick Flannelly	All-Ireland MHC winning captain 1949	Succeeded by Pat Lennon
