= 1910 Tipperary Senior Hurling Championship =

Annual hurling competition season

- Champions: Toomevara (2nd title)
- Runners-up: Racecourse

The 1910 Tipperary Senior Hurling Championship was the 21st staging of the Tipperary Senior Hurling Championship since its establishment by the Tipperary County Board in 1887.

Thurles were the defending champions.

Toomevara won the championship. It was their second championship title overall and their first title since 1890.
