= 1906 Tipperary Senior Hurling Championship =

Annual hurling competition season

- Champions: Thurles (3rd title)
- Runners-up: Lahorna de Wets

The 1906 Tipperary Senior Hurling Championship was the 17th staging of the Tipperary Senior Hurling Championship since its establishment by the Tipperary County Board in 1887.

Two-Mile Borris were the defending champions.

Thurles won the championship after a 4–11 to 3–06 defeat of Lahorna de Wets in the final. It was their third championship title overall and their first title since 1904.
