= John Haugh =

Irish hurler

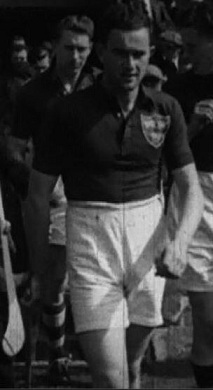

Personal information
- Born: 1930 Toomevara, County Tipperary
- Died: 1998 (aged 67–68)

Sport
- Sport: Hurling
- Position: Midfield
Clubs
- Years: Club
- 1950–1952 & 1956–1968 1953–1955: Toomevara; Holycross-Ballycahill
Club titles
- Tipperary titles: 2
Inter-county
- Years: County
- 1951–1961: Tipperary
Inter-county titles
- Munster titles: 3
- All-Irelands: 3
- NHL: 4

John Haugh (1930–1998) was an Irish sportsperson. He played hurling with local club Toomevara and also with Holycross-Ballycahill. He was a member of the Tipperary senior inter-county hurling team from 1951 to 1961.

== Early life ==
John Haugh was born into a sporting family in Ballycrinode in the parish of Toomevara in 1930. His uncle Dennis Haugh had previously been crowned British Light-Heavyweight boxing champion in 1913. Toomevara is a parish steeped in hurling tradition, so it was only to be expected that hurling would interest John from an early age. He learned the skills and acquired the arts of the game from his masters and his peers and he became one of the great players of his parish and county.

=== Club ===
In 1950, at the age of twenty, John made his debut for the Toomevara senior team and hurled with them until 1952. Finding employment in Dwan's Mineral Waters in Thurles resulted in his transfer from Toomevara to Holycross-Ballycahill. John won a Mid Tipperary senior hurling title in 1954 and later that year went on to win his first county senior hurling title with Holycross-Ballycahill defeating Roscrea in the final on a scoreline of 6-5 to 2-3. Haugh also won a Mid Tipperary junior football championship in his time with Holycross-Ballycahill.

In 1956, Toomevara regained senior status and John threw in his lot with his native parish once again. John played in his first North Tipperary senior hurling final in 1957 in a losing effort to Nenagh, and this was to be his first of seven North Tipperary senior hurling final appearances in a row up to 1963. He won four North Tipperary championships during this period with Toomevara, the first in 1958 against Kilruane MacDonaghs. Toomevara reached the county final that year but were beaten by Thurles Sarsfields. In 1960, after again defeating Kilruane MacDonaghs to win the North Tipperary senior hurling final, John won his second county title when Toomevara defeated a Thurles Sarsfields side who were seeking their sixth county title in a row, the final score being Toomevara 3-15 Thurles Sarsfields 2-8. On this occasion Toomevara were more confident and were in excellent physical condition due to the work of Ossie Bennett, who went on to prepare Tipperary teams through the golden era of the 1960s. John had known the Sarsfields from the time he spent with Holycross and was fully intent on revenge for the times he had lost to them. He relished the challenge, gave an outstanding performance at midfield and inspired his teammates to a memorable victory over one of the greatest club teams of all time. John was captain of the Toomevara side that retained the North Division title in 1961 by defeating Borrisokane and became the very first recipient of the new trophy for the championship, the Frank McGrath Cup, presented in honour of Frank McGrath, who himself won three senior hurling championships with Toomevara in 1912, 1913, and 1914. Toomevara however lost their county title to Thurles Sarsfields that year. A great damper was put on the game beforehand when tragedy struck the Haugh family. John's brother, Gerry, a valued member of the team, was killed in a traffic accident near Clonakilty, County Cork. In the postponed final, John was sent off early in the game for what seemed a trivial offence. John won his fourth and final North Tipperary senior hurling final in 1962 when Toomevara defeated Kilruane MacDonaghs. He also played in the North Tipperary final of 1966, which Toomevara lost narrowly to Lorrha.

=== Inter-county ===
In 1951, John gave the first indication of his potential when he gave an outstanding display for North Tipperary in a Miller Shield game. The Miller Shield Tournament was an inter-divisional competition played in the spring. Soon after John was brought onto the Tipperary senior panel and played his first game in a Tipperary jersey in a tournament game against Galway for the Ballinakill College building fund. From there on he never looked back. He came on as a substitute in the first round of the 1951 Munster hurling championship against Waterford. In the Munster semi-final he lined out at centrefield against Limerick. He didn't play in the Munster final but was selected at midfield alongside his clubmate Phil Shanahan for the All-Ireland final against Wexford. The All Ireland final, which was seen by 70,000 spectators, saw Tipperary wearing Blue (Munster) and their opponents Wexford, wearing green (Leinster). Wexford took an early 5 point lead, but by half time Tipperary had recovered to lead by a goal. The second half proved to be much easier for Tipperary as Wexford's inexperience proved fatal and Tipperary won by 7-7 to 3-9. This was to be the first of John's three All-Ireland medals. He played at midfield for Tipperary all through the fifties and didn't win his second All-Ireland medal until 1958 when Tipperary defeated Galway on a scoreline of 4-9 to 2-5. Toomevara provided the leadership for Tipperary in the 1961 championship. Matt Hassett was captain when they defeated Dublin in the All Ireland Final by one point, 0-16 to 1-12 . Dublin looked to be on the way to victory due to the dominance of Des Foley at midfield, but John was introduced from the subs bench in the second half in an effort to curb the rampant Foley. Such were his efforts that he changed the course of the game and ensured a Tipperary victory and the return of the McCarthy Cup for the first time ever to Toomevara. This was John's last game for Tipperary but one that gave him the greatest satisfaction.

John also won four National Hurling League titles, the first one coming in 1952 when Tipperary beat New York in New York. His other successes came against Kilkenny in 1954, Wexford in 1955 and Kilkenny again in 1957. In the last of those he was described as having a magnificent game and was going as powerfully at the finish as at the start. He received the Sport Star of the Week accolade in the Irish Independent for his display. He played in the famous League final of 1956 when Wexford defeated Tipperary, who appeared to have an unassailable lead at half-time, but lost it to a thundering, storm-assisted Wexford rally in the second half. He also lost a National Hurling League final with Tipperary in 1953 to Cork. As well as winning three Munster Finals with Tipperary in 1951, 1958 and 1961, John also lost three Munster Hurling Finals in 1952, 1953 and 1954, on each occasion to Cork.

=== Provincial ===
Haugh also lined out with Munster in the Railway Cup Interprovincial Championship. He first played for his province in 1954 losing to Leinster in the final by 0–9 to 0–5. However, John annexed a Railway Cup winners medal in 1955 when Munster who were captained by hurling great Christy Ring defeated Connacht in the final by a scoreline of 6–8 to 3–4.

Haugh retired from hurling in 1968 after a long and successful career. He was chosen at midfield for the North Tipperary Centenary Hurling Team of 1951–2001.

== Honours ==
=== Toomevara ===
- Tipperary Senior Hurling Championship:
  - Winner (1): 1960
  - Runner-up (2): 1958, 1961
- North Tipperary Senior Club Hurling Championship:
  - Winner (4): 1958, 1960, 1961, 1962
  - Runner-up (4): 1957, 1959, 1963, 1966

=== Holycross-Ballycahill ===
- Tipperary Senior Hurling Championship:
  - Winner (1): 1954
- Mid Tipperary Senior Club Hurling Championship:
  - Winner (1): 1954
- Mid Tipperary Junior "A" Football Championship:
  - Winner (1): 1954

=== Tipperary ===
- All-Ireland Senior Hurling Championship:
  - Winner (3): 1951, 1958, 1961
- Munster Senior Hurling Championship:
  - Winner (3): 1951, 1958, 1961
  - Runner-up (3): 1952, 1953, 1954
- National Hurling League:
  - Winner (4): 1952, 1954, 1955, 1957
  - Runner-up (2): 1953, 1956

=== Provincial ===
- Railway Cup:
  - Winner (1): 1955
  - Runner-up (1): 1954
