= 1974 Tipperary Senior Hurling Championship =

Annual hurling competition season

- Dates: 19 May - 13 October 1974
- Teams: 33
- Champions: Thurles Sarsfields (28th title); Jimmy Doyle (captain)
- Runners-up: Silvermines; Jim O'Brien (captain)

The 1974 Tipperary Senior Hurling Championship was the 83rd staging of the Tipperary Senior Hurling Championship since its establishment by the Tipperary County Board in 1887. The championship ran from 19 May to 13 October 1974.

Roscrea entered the championship as the defending champions.

The final was played on 13 October 1974 at Semple Stadium in Thurles, between Thurles Sarsfields and Silvermines, in what was their first ever meeting in the final. Thurles Sarsfields won the match by 3–06 to 1–10 to claim their 28th championship title overall and a first title in nine years.

== Results ==
=== Quarter-finals ===
4 August 1974 Quarter-final	Newport	1-11 - 2-08	Toomevara	MacDonagh Park
	C Moroney 1-2, D Coffey 0-4, M Jones 0-4, M O'Brien 0-1.		D Cuddy 1-0, T Maxwell 1-0, D Kennedy 0-3, L Hackett 0-2, M Young 0-1, L McGrath 0-1, M Delaney 0-1.

4 August 1974 Quarter-final	Thurles Sarsfields	2-12 - 2-08	Moneygall	MacDonagh Park
	J Doyle 1-6, F Murphy 1-0, J Connors 0-2, E Clancy 0-2, P Byrne 0-1, J Doyle (jnr) 0-1.		P Sheedy 1-2, S Ryan 0-5, P Fanning 1-1.

4 August 1974 Quarter-final	Borris-Ileigh	2-17 - 2-06	Moyne-Templetuohy	Semple Stadium
	N O'Dwyer 1-7, B Kenny 1-2, M Coen 0-3, L Carroll 0-2, J Kenny 0-2, M Stapleton 0-1.		W Fogarty 1-4, W O'Grady (W) 1-0, J Fogarty 0-1, T Quinlan 0-1.

4 August 1974 Quarter-final	Silvermines	1-15 - 2-07	Moycarkey-Borris	Semple Stadium
	J Kennedy 0-5, M Daffy 1-1, J Forde 0-4, M Hanley 0-2, J Ryan 0-2, P Quinlan 0-1.		J Flanagan 0-5, Martin Ryan 1-0, D Ryan 1-0, D Quigley 0-1, Michael Ryan 0-1.

18 August 1974 Quarter-final replay	Newport	1-10 - 2-09	Toomevara	MacDonagh Park
	M Jones 0-9, N Ryan 1-0, C Moroney 0-1.		D Kennedy 1-4, T Maxwell 1-1, M Young 0-2, L Hackett 0-1, L McGrath 0-1.

=== Semi-finals ===
15 September 1974 Semi-final	Thurles Sarsfields	3-15 - 2-09	Toomevara	MacDonagh Park
	J Bourke 3-0, P Byrne 0-4, J Doyle 0-3, J O'Dwyer 0-3, E Clancy 0-2, P McCormack 0-2, J Doyle (jnr) 0-1.		D Kennedy 0-5, L McGrath 1-1, T Whelehan 1-0, L Hackett 0-1, T Maxwell 0-1, M Young 0-1.	Referee: J Moloney (Bansha)

15 September 1974 Semi-final	Silvermines	4-07 - 4-04	Borris-Ileigh	MacDonagh Park
	P Quinlan 1-3, J Forde 1-2, M Daffy 1-1, J Sherlock 1-0, J Ryan 0-1.		T O'Dwyer 2-0, N O'Dwyer 1-2, B Kenny 1-1, M Stapleton 0-1.	Referee: S O'Meara (Lorrha)

=== Final ===
13 October 1974 Final	Thurles Sarsfields	3-06 - 1-10	Silvermines	Semple Stadium
	J Bourke 2-1, J Doyle 0-4, J Dwyer 1-0, J Cooke 0-1.		P Quinlan 1-3, J Kennedy 0-3, J Ryan 0-2, J Forde 0-1, M Fitzgibbon 0-1.	Referee: J Moloney (Bansha)

== Statistics ==
=== Miscellaneous ===
- Thurles Sarsfields win their first title since 1965.
- Silvermines qualify for the final for the first, and to date only, time.
