= Donal O'Brien (hurler) =

Irish hurler

Personal information
- Native name: Dónall Ó Briain (Irish)
- Nickname: 'Daniel"
- Born: 6 July 1940 Knockavilla, County Tipperary, Ireland
- Died: 8 April 2012 (aged 71) Southwark, London, England
- Height: 5 ft 8 in (173 cm)

Sport
- Sport: Hurling
- Position: Goalkeeper
Club
- Years: Club
- 1958-1962: Knockavilla–Donaskeigh Kickhams
Club titles
- Tipperary titles: 0
Inter-county
Years	County	Apps (scores)
1961-1962	Tipperary	7 (0-00)
Inter-county titles
- Munster titles: 2
- All-Irelands: 2
- NHL: 1

Donal O'Brien (6 July 1940 – 8 April 2012) was an Irish hurler who played as a goalkeeper for the Tipperary senior team.

O'Brien made his first appearance for the team during the 1961 championship and was a regular member of the starting fifteen for just two full seasons before his emigration to New York. During that time he won two All-Ireland medals, two Munster medals and one National Hurling League medal.

At club level O'Brien enjoyed a brief career with Knockavilla–Donaskeigh Kickhams.

O'Brien suffered an aortic aneurysm while on vacation with his wife and granddaughter. He died on 8 April 2012.
