= 2005 Tipperary Senior Hurling Championship =

Annual hurling competition season

- Sponsor: Cidona
- Champions: Thurles Sarsfields (29th title); Ger O'Grady (captain); Ger Cunningham (manager)
- Runners-up: Drom-Inch; Damien Young (captain); Martin Everard (manager)

The 2005 Tipperary Senior Hurling Championship was the 114th staging of the Tipperary Senior Hurling Championship since its establishment by the Tipperary County Board in 1887.

Toomevara were the defending champions, however, they were beaten by Thurles Sarsfields in the quarter-finals stage.

The final was played on 16 October 2005 at Semple Stadium in Thurles, between Thurles Sarsfields and first-time finalists Drom & Inch. Thurles Sarsfields won the match by 1–17 to 0–15 to claim their 29th championship title overall and a first title in 29 years.

== Results ==
=== Preliminary round ===
10 September 2005 Preliminary round	Drom-Inch	2-17 - 2-11	Moneygall	Semple Stadium

10 September 2005 Preliminary round	Toomevara	1-25 - 1-14	Ballingarry	Semple Stadium

11 September 2005 Preliminary round	Nenagh Éire Óg	0-16 - 0-10	Kiladangan	MacDonagh Park

=== Quarter-finals ===
17 September 2005 Quarter-final	Loughmore-Castleiney	4-13 - 1-18	Killenaule	Semple Stadium

17 September 2005 Quarter-final	Nenagh Éire Óg	4-16 - 2-11	Cappawhite	Semple Stadium

17 September 2005 Quarter-final	Thurles Sarsfields	1-20 - 1-16	Toomevara	Semple Stadium

24 September 2005 Quarter-final	Drom-Inch	1-08 - 1-04	Borris-Ileigh	Semple Stadium

=== Semi-finals ===
2 October 2005 Semi-final	Thurles Sarsfields	2-19 - 2-14	Loughmore-Castleiney	Semple Stadium
	J Enright, 0-10; L Corbett 1-3; P Lawlor 1-0; R Ruth, W Culley 0-2 each; G O'Grady, S Lillis 0-1 each.	Report	E Sweeney 0-8; N Morris 1-3; S Bohan 1-0; T King 0-2; M Gleeson 0-1.

2 October 2005 Semi-final	Drom-Inch	2-17 - 0-14	Nenagh Éire Óg	Semple Stadium
	S Butler 1-10; S Callanan 1-1; M Butler 0-3; J Woodlock 0-2; E Buckley 0-1.	Report	K Tucker 0-6; J Kennedy, E Tucker, N Moloney 0-2 each; P Ryan and D O Meara 0-1 each.

=== Final ===
16 October 2005 Final	Thurles Sarsfields	1-17 - 0-15	Drom-Inch	Semple Stadium
	J Enright 0-6 (0-3 from frees), W Cully 1-2 (1-0 free), G O’Grady and R Ruth 0-3 each, E Enright, P Lawlor and S Lillis 0-1 each.	Report	S Butler 0-11 (0-7 frees), J Woodlock 0-2, M Butler 0-1 (free) and K Butler 0-1 each.	Attendance: 12,710; Referee: B White (Clonmel Commercials)
