= 2017–18 All-Ireland Junior B Club Hurling Championship =

13th staging of the All-Ireland Junior B Club Hurling Championship

- Sponsor: Killeedy GAA Club
- Champions: Thurles Sarsfields (1st title)
- Runners-up: Kilnadeema–Leitrim

The 2017–18 All-Ireland Junior B Club Hurling Championship was the 13th staging of the All-Ireland Junior B Club Hurling Championship since its establishment by the Killeedy GAA Club in 2005.

The All-Ireland final was played on 18 February at Páirc Íde Naofa between Thurles Sarsfields and Kilnadeema–Leitrim, in what was their first ever meeting in the final. Thurles Sarsfields won the match by 2–11 to 1–13 to claim their first ever All-Ireland title.
