= 1908 Tipperary Senior Hurling Championship =

Annual hurling competition season

- Champions: Thurles (5th title)
- Runners-up: Glengoole

The 1908 Tipperary Senior Hurling Championship was the 19th staging of the Tipperary Senior Hurling Championship since its establishment by the Tipperary County Board in 1887.

Thurles were the defending champions.

Thurles won the championship after a 2–06 to 4–02 defeat of Glengoole in the final. It was their fifth championship title overall and their third title in succession.
