= David Butler (hurler) =

Irish hurler (born 1992)

Personal information
- Native name: Daithí de Buitléir (Irish)
- Born: 1992 (age 33–34) Dundrum, County Tipperary, Ireland

Sport
- Sport: Hurling
- Position: Right wing-forward
Club
- Years: Club
- Knockavilla–Donaskeigh Kickhams
Club titles
- Tipperary titles: 0
Inter-county
- Years: County
- 2014-present: Kerry

David Butler (born 1992) is an Irish hurler who plays as a right wing-forward for the Kerry senior team.

Born in Dundrum, County Tipperary, Butler first played competitive hurling during his schooling at Cashel Community sive School. He arrived on the inter-county scene at the age of sixteen when he first linked up with the Tipperary minor team before later joining the junior Gaelic football team. He made his senior debut for Kerry during the 2014 league. Butler quickly became a regular member of the starting fifteen and has won one Christy Ring Cup medal. He has been a Christy Ring Cup runner-up on one occasion.

At club level Butler plays with Knockavilla–Donaskeigh Kickhams.

== Honours ==
=== Team ===
Kerry

- Christy Ring Cup (1): 2015
