= 1907 Tipperary Senior Hurling Championship =

Annual hurling competition season

- Champions: Thurles (4th title)
- Runners-up: Lahorna de Wets

The 1907 Tipperary Senior Hurling Championship was the 18th staging of the Tipperary Senior Hurling Championship since its establishment by the Tipperary County Board in 1887.

Thurles were the defending champions.

Thurles won the championship after a 3–13 to 1–06 defeat of Lahorna de Wets in the final. It was their fourth championship title overall and their second title in succession.
