= 1890 Tipperary Senior Hurling Championship =

Annual hurling competition season

- Champions: Toomevara (1st title)

The 1890 Tipperary Senior Hurling Championship was the fourth staging of the Tipperary Senior Hurling Championship since its establishment by the Tipperary County Board in 1887.

Toomevara won the championship. It was their first championship title.
