= 1958 Tipperary Senior Hurling Championship =

Annual hurling competition season

- Dates: 24 August – 21 September 1958
- Teams: 4
- Champions: Thurles Sarsfields (21st title); Tony Wall (captain)
- Runners-up: Toomevara; Phil Shanahan (captain)

Tournament statistics
- Matches played: 3
- Goals scored: 24 (8 per match)
- Points scored: 34 (11.33 per match)
- Top scorer(s): Jimmy Doyle (2–08)

The 1958 Tipperary Senior Hurling Championship was the 67th staging of the Tipperary Senior Hurling Championship since its establishment by the Tipperary County Board in 1887. The championship ran from 24 August to 21 September 1958.

Thurles Sarsfields were the defending champions.

The final was played on 21 September 1958 at Thurles Sportsfield, between Thurles Sarsfields and Toomevara. Thurles Sarsfields won the match by 4–11 to 3–03 to claim their 21st championship title overall and a fourth consecutive title.

== Qualification ==
Championship	Champions
Mid Tipperary Senior Hurling Championship	Thurles Sarsfields
North Tipperary Senior Hurling Championship	Toomevara
South Tipperary Senior Hurling Championship	Carrick Swans
West Tipperary Senior Hurling Championship	Knockavilla–Donaskeigh Kickhams

== Results ==
=== Semi-finals ===
24 August 1958 Semi-final	Toomevara	4-08 - 2-05	Knockavilla–Donaskeigh Kickhams	Páirc Shíleáin
	S Ryan 2-1, J Donovan 1-3, S Guerin 1-0, P Shanahan 0-2, T Shanahan 0-1, D Cuddy 0-1.		J Farrell 1-2, S Regan 1-0, P Cleary 0-1, C Cleary 0-1, J Browne 0-1.

14 September 1958 Semi-final	Thurles Sarsfields	8-07 - 3-00	Carrick Swans	Clonmel GAA Ground
	P Dorney 3-0, J Doyle 1-5, L Keane 2-1, S McLoughlin 2-0, M Maher 0-1.		W Waters 2-0, P Creane 1-0.

=== Final ===
21 September 1958 Final	Thurles Sarsfields	4-11 - 3-03	Toomevara	MacDonagh Park
	J Doyle 1-3, S McLoughlin 1-1, L Keane 1-1, N Murphy 1-0, M Maher 0-2, A Wall 0-1, M McElgunn 0-1, P Dorney 0-1 and 0-1 from a melee.		S Guerin 1-0, D Cuddy 1-0, J Hough 1-0, P Shanahan 0-2, M O'Gara 0-1.

== Championship statistics ==
=== Top scorers ===
Rank	Player	Club	Tally	Total	Matches	Average
1	Jimmy Doyle	Thurles Sarsfields	2-08	14	2	7.00
2	Larry Keane	Thurles Sarsfields	3-02	11	2	5.50
3	Seán McLoughlin	Thurles Sarsfields	3-01	10	2	5.00
3	Patsy Dorney	Thurles Sarsfields	3-01	10	2	5.00
