= 1928 Tipperary Senior Hurling Championship =

Annual hurling competition season

- Champions: Boherlahan (9th title)
- Runners-up: Clonoulty

The 1928 Tipperary Senior Hurling Championship was the 37th staging of the Tipperary Senior Hurling Championship since its establishment by the Tipperary County Board in 1887.

Boherlahan won the championship after a 5–04 to 2–02 defeat of Clonoulty in the final. It was their ninth championship title overall and their second title in succession.

== Results ==
=== Final ===
23 September 1928 Final	Boherlahan	5-04 - 2-02	Clonoulty	Thurles Sportsfield
