= 1904 Tipperary Senior Hurling Championship =

Annual hurling competition season

- Champions: Thurles (2nd title)
- Runners-up: Lahorna de Wets

The 1904 Tipperary Senior Hurling Championship was the 15th staging of the Tipperary Senior Hurling Championship since its establishment by the Tipperary County Board in 1887.

Two-Mile Borris were the defending champions.

Thurles won the championship after receiving a walkover from Lahorna de Wets in the final. It was their second championship title overall and their first title since 1887.
