= 1949 All-Ireland Minor Hurling Championship =

All-Ireland Minor Hurling Championship 1949
All Ireland Champions
- Winners: Tipperary (6th win)
- Captain: John O'Grady

All Ireland Runners-up
- Runners-up: Kilkenny
- Captain: Tommy Walton

Provincial Champions
- Munster: Tipperary
- Leinster: Kilkenny
- Ulster: Antrim
- Connacht: Galway

The 1949 All-Ireland Minor Hurling Championship was the 19th staging of the All-Ireland Minor Hurling Championship since its establishment by the Gaelic Athletic Association in 1928.

Waterford entered the championship as the defending champions, however, they were beaten by Tipperary in the Munster semi-final.

On 4 September 1949 Tipperary won the championship following a 6-5 to 2-4 defeat of Kilkenny in the All-Ireland final. This was their sixth All-Ireland title and their first in two championship seasons.

== Results ==
=== All-Ireland Minor Hurling Championship ===
Semi-finals

7 August 1949 Semi-final	Kilkenny	4-03 - 1-01	Galway	Croke Park, Dublin

14 August 1949 Semi-final	Tipperary	9-07 - 0-02	Antrim	Croke Park, Dublin

Final

4 September 1949 Final	Tipperary	6-05 - 2-04	Kilkenny	Croke Park, Dublin
