= 1965 Tipperary Senior Hurling Championship =

Annual hurling competition season

- Dates: 10 October – 21 November 1965
- Teams: 6
- Champions: Thurles Sarsfields (27th title); Patsy Dorney (captain)
- Runners-up: Carrick Davins; Tuckey Ryan (captain)

Tournament statistics
- Matches played: 6
- Goals scored: 30 (5 per match)
- Points scored: 104 (17.33 per match)
- Top scorer(s): Jimmy Doyle (2–22)

The 1965 Tipperary Senior Hurling Championship was the 74th staging of the Tipperary Senior Hurling Championship since its establishment by the Tipperary County Board in 1887. The championship ran from 10 October to 21 November 1965.

Thurles Sarsfields were the defending champions.

The final, a replay, was played on 21 November 1965 at Thurles Sportsfield, between Thurles Sarsfields and first-time finalists Carrick Davins. Thurles Sarsfields won the match by 3–11 to 2–07 to claim their 27th championship title overall, a fifth consecutive title and a 10th title in eleven years.

Jimmy Doyle was the championship's top scorer with 2–22.

== Qualification ==
Championship	Champions	Second team
Mid Tipperary Senior Hurling Championship	Thurles Sarsfields	Moycarkey-Borris
North Tipperary Senior Hurling Championship	Kilruane MacDonaghs	Lorrha
South Tipperary Senior Hurling Championship	Carrick Davins	n/a
West Tipperary Senior Hurling Championship	Cashel King Cormacs	n/a

== Results ==
=== Quarter-finals ===
10 October 1965 Quarter-final	Cashel King Cormacs	2-06 - 3-10	Thurles Sarsfields	Cashel Sportsfield, Cashel
	Ivors 1-3, P O'Sullivan 1-0, M O'Sullivan 0-2, D O'Connor 0-1.		S McLoughlin 3-0, J Doyle 0-5, Wall 0-1, T Walsh 0-1, P Doyle 0-1.

10 October 1965 Quarter-final	Lorrha	6-07 - 4-14	Carrick Davins	Cashel Sportsfield, Cashel
	M Kennedy 2-0, W Morris 1-1, M Liffey 1-0, M Doyle 1-0, N Lane 1-0, P Hogan 0-3, J Lane 0-2, J Ryan 0-1.		T Murphy 1-2, PJ Ryan 1-2, M Roche 0-5, J Ryan 1-1, J Roche 1-0, J Walsh 0-1, T Ryan 0-1, R Walsh 0-1, P Arrigan 0-1.

=== Semi-finals ===
31 October 1965 Semi-final	Thurles Sarsfields	1-12 - 1-09	Kilruane MacDonaghs	MacDonagh Park, Nenagh
	J Doyle 0-7, S McLoughlin 1-0, P Butler 0-2, T Wall 0-2, P Doyle 0-1.		J McCarthy 0-4, M Dwyer 1-0, T Moloughney 0-2, S O'Meara 0-2, S Hyland 0-1.

31 October 1965 Semi-final	Carrick Davins	2-11 - 1-06	Moycarkey-Borris	Clonmel Sportsfield, Clonmel
	T Ryan 2-2, M Roche 0-5, PJ Ryan 0-2, T Murphy 0-1, C Broderick 0-1.

=== Final ===
14 November 1965 Final	Thurles Sarsfields	2-07 - 3-04	Carrick Davins	Clonmel Sportsfield, Clonmel
	J Doyle 1-4, P Dorney 1-0, S McLoughlin 0-1, T Walsh 0-1, K Holohan 0-1.		M Roche 1-3, M Hassett 1-0, J Ryan 1-0, T Ryan 0-1.	Referee: P Ryan (Borris-Ileigh)

=== Final replay ===
21 November 1965 Final replay	Thurles Sarsfields	3-11 - 2-07	Carrick Davins	Cashel Sportsfield, Cashel
	J Doyle 1-6, P Doyle 1-1, P Dorney 1-1, S McLoughlin 0-3.		C Broderick 2-0, M Roche 0-4, J Walsh 0-2, PJ Ryan 0-1.	Referee: P Ryan (Borris-Ileigh)

== Championship statistics ==
=== Top scorers ===
Rank	Player	Club	Tally	Total	Matches	Average
1	Jimmy Doyle	Thurles Sarsfields	2-22	28	4	7.00
2	Mick Roche	Carrick Davins	1-17	20	4	5.00
3	Seán McLoughlin	Thurles Sarsfields	4-04	16	4	4.00
