= 1964 Tipperary Senior Hurling Championship =

Annual hurling competition season

- Dates: 11 October - 15 November 1964
- Teams: 6
- Champions: Thurles Sarsfields (26th title); Jimmy Doyle (captain)
- Runners-up: Holycross-Ballycahill

Tournament statistics
- Matches played: 6
- Goals scored: 26 (4.33 per match)
- Points scored: 119 (19.83 per match)
- Top scorer(s): Séamus Mackey (5–11)

The 1964 Tipperary Senior Hurling Championship was the 73rd staging of the Tipperary Senior Hurling Championship since its establishment by the Tipperary County Board in 1887. The championship ran from 11 October to 15 November 1964.

Thurles Sarsfields were the defending champions.

The final was played on 15 November 1964 at Thurles Sportsfield, between Thurles Sarsfields and Holycross–Ballycahill, in what was their first ever meeting in the final. Thurles Sarsfields won the match by 5–13 to 1–04 to claim their 26th championship title overall and a fourth consecutive title.

Holycross–Ballycahill's Séamus Mackey was the championship's top scorer with 5–11.

== Qualification ==
| Championship | Champions | Second team |
|---|---|---|
| Mid Tipperary Senior Hurling Championship | Thurles Sarsfields | Holycross–Ballycahill |
| North Tipperary Senior Hurling Championship | Nenagh Éire Óg | Roscrea |
| South Tipperary Senior Hurling Championship | Marlfield | n/a |
| West Tipperary Senior Hurling Championship | Éire Óg Annacarty | n/a |

== Results ==
=== Quarter-finals ===
| 11 October 1964 Quarter-final | Holycross–Ballycahill | 3-10 - 2-11 | Marlfield | Thurles Sportsfield |
| | S Mackey 1-6, P Cahill 2-1, P Stakelum 0-2, D Maher 0-1. | | T O'Neill 1-1, J Kennedy 1-0, T English 0-3, T Ryan 0-2, PJ Ryan 0-2, S O'Connell 0-2, S White 0-1. |

| 11 October 1964 Quarter-final | Éire Óg Annacarty | 1-03 - 3-15 | Roscrea | Thurles Sportsfield |
| | Pat Corbett 1-1, H Cummins 0-1, P Corbett 0-1. | | S Carroll 2-1, M Nolan 1-2, F Loughnane 0-5, M Minogue 0-2, B Hogan 0-1, D Moloney 0-1, P Roland 0-1, J Carroll 0-1, N Heffernan 0-1. |

=== Semi-finals ===
| 25 October 1964 Semi-final | Nenagh Éire Óg | 2-12 - 2-12 | Holycross–Ballycahill | Thurles Sportsfield |
| | P Kennedy 1-1, T Moloney 0-4, O Tucker 1-0, M Kearns 0-3, A Ayres 0-3, M Burns 0-1. | | S Mackey 2-3, P Stakelum 0-2, L Ryan 0-2, R Ryan 0-1, T Ryan 0-1, J Doyle 0-1, P Cahill 0-1, D Dwyer 0-1. |

| 1 November 1964 Semi-final | Thurles Sarsfields | 3-09 - 1-10 | Roscrea | MacDonagh Park |
| | J Doyle 1-7, S McLoughlin 1-0, P Dorney 1-0, P Butler 0-2. | | S Carroll 1-0, D Moloney 0-3, M Nolan 0-3, P Roland 0-2, N Hogan 0-1, P Dynan 0-1. |

| 8 November 1964 Semi-final replay | Nenagh Éire Óg | 0-14 - 3-06 | Holycross–Ballycahill | Thurles Sportsfield |
| | M Kearns 0-7, P Kennedy 0-3, T Moloney 0-2, M Burns 0-1, A Ayres 0-1. | | S Mackey 2-2, J Spillane 1-1, P Cahill 0-1, J Doyle 0-1, P Stakelum 0-1. |

=== Final ===
| 15 November 1964 Final | Thurles Sarsfields | 5-13 - 1-04 | Holycross–Ballycahill | Thurles Sportsfield |
| | J Doyle 3-3, S McLoughlin 2-3, P Dorney 0-2, PJ Semple 0-1, J Hogan 0-1, T Walsh 0-1, P Doyle 0-1, T Wall 0-1. | | J Spillane 1-3, J Doyle 0-1. |

== Championship statistics ==
=== Top scorers ===
| Rank | Player | Club | Tally | Total | Matches | Average |
|---|---|---|---|---|---|---|
| 1 | Séamus Mackey | Holycross–Ballycahill | 5-11 | 26 | 4 | 6.50 |
| 2 | Jimmy Doyle | Thurles Sarsfields | 4-10 | 22 | 2 | 11.00 |
| 3 | Seán McLoughlin | Thurles Sarsfields | 3-03 | 12 | 2 | 6.00 |
