= 1955 Tipperary Senior Hurling Championship =

Annual hurling competition season

- Dates: 18 September – 2 October 1955
- Teams: 4
- Champions: Thurles Sarsfields (18th title); Mickey Byrne (captain)
- Runners-up: Borris-Ileigh

Tournament statistics
- Matches played: 3
- Goals scored: 21 (7 per match)
- Points scored: 52 (17.33 per match)

The 1955 Tipperary Senior Hurling Championship was the 64th staging of the Tipperary Senior Hurling Championship since its establishment by the Tipperary County Board in 1887. The championship ran from 18 September to 2 October 1955.

Holycross–Ballycahill were the defending champions, however, they were beaten by Thurles Sarsfields in the Mid Tipperary SHC final.

The final was played on 2 October 1955 at Thurles Sportsfield, between Thurles Sarsfields and Borris–Ileigh, in what was their second meeting in the final overall. Thurles Sarsfields won the match by 4–10 to 0–06 to claim their 18th championship title overall and a first title in three years.

== Qualification ==
Championship	Champions
Mid Tipperary Senior Hurling Championship	Thurles Sarsfields
North Tipperary Senior Hurling Championship	Borris–Ileigh
South Tipperary Senior Hurling Championship	Killenaule
West Tipperary Senior Hurling Championship	Knockavilla–Donaskeigh Kickhams

== Results ==
=== Semi-finals ===
18 September 1955 Semi-final	Thurles Sarsfields	4-14 - 2-03	Killenaule	Leahy Park

25 September 1955 Semi-final	Borris–Ileigh	5-14 - 6-05	Knockavilla–Donaskeigh Kickhams	Thurles Sportsfield

=== Final ===
2 October 1955 Final	Thurles Sarsfields	4-10 - 0-06	Borris-Ileigh	Thurles Sportsfield
	PJ O'Brien 2-0, M Butler 0-4, M Maher 1-0, T Barrett 1-0, T Ryan 0-2, C Keane 0-2, L Keane 0-2.		L Devaney 0-3, N Ryan 0-1, S Kenny 0-1, J Finn 0-1.
