= 1963 Tipperary Senior Hurling Championship =

Annual hurling competition season

- Dates: 15 September – 27 October 1963
- Teams: 6
- Champions: Thurles Sarsfields (25th title); Bobby Mockler (captain)
- Runners-up: Roscrea; Mick Nolan (captain)

Tournament statistics
- Matches played: 5
- Goals scored: 32 (6.4 per match)
- Points scored: 73 (14.6 per match)
- Top scorer(s): Jimmy Doyle (1–10); Pat Dynan (0–13)

The 1963 Tipperary Senior Hurling Championship was the 72nd staging of the Tipperary Senior Hurling Championship since its establishment by the Tipperary County Board in 1887. The championship ran from 15 September to 27 October 1963.

Thurles Sarsfields were the defending champions.

The final was played on 27 October 1963 at MacDonagh Park in Nenagh, between Thurles Sarsfields and Roscrea, in what was their third meeting in the final overall. Thurles Sarsfields won the match by 4–10 to 2–10 to claim their 25th championship title overall and a third consecutive title.

== Qualification ==
Championship	Champions	Second team
Mid Tipperary Senior Hurling Championship	Thurles Sarsfields	Moycarkey–Borris
North Tipperary Senior Hurling Championship	Roscrea	Toomevara
South Tipperary Senior Hurling Championship	Killenaule	n/a
West Tipperary Senior Hurling Championship	St Patrick's	n/a

== Results ==
=== Quarter-finals ===
22 September 1963 Quarter-final	Moycarkey-Borris	6-05 - 4-02	St Patrick's	Leahy Park
	L Hennessy 2-0, T O'Dwyer 2-0, D Ryan 0-4, T Wright 1-0, R Buckley 1-0, B Shanahan 0-1.		C Ahern 1-1, J Fahey 1-0, M Ryan 1-0, J Leahy 1-0, J Hassett 0-1.

29 September 1963 Quarter-final	Toomevara	4-12 - 1-08	Killenaule	Leahy Park
	P Shanahan 2-3, T Shanahan 0-5, R Ryan 1-1, D Cummins 1-0, P McGrath 0-1, T Ryan 0-1.		T Ryan 0-4, T Cooke 1-0, P Browne 0-1, W O'Grady 0-1, S Nash 0-1, S Walsh 0-1.

=== Semi-finals ===
6 October 1963 Semi-final	Thurles Sarsfields	4-06 - 2-06	Toomevara	MacDonagh Park
	S McLoughlin 2-1, P Dorney 1-0, L Keane 1-0, J Doyle 0-3, T Walsh 0-1, M McElgunn 0-1.		F Ryan 2-1, T Shanahan 0-2, P Shanahan 0-2, C Gleeson 0-1.

6 October 1963 Semi-final	Roscrea	1-12 - 4-02	Moycarkey-Borris	MacDonagh Park
	P Dynan 0-7, S English 1-0, P O'Meara 0-3, F Loughnane 0-1, M Minogue 0-1.		P Coman 2-0, J Coman 1-0, T O'Dwyer 1-0, G Ryan 0-1, D Ryan 0-1.

=== Final ===
27 October 1963 Final	Thurles Sarsfields	4-10 - 2-10	Roscrea	MacDonagh Park
	J Doyle 1-7, P Dorney 1-2, L Keane 1-0, S McLoughlin 1-0, M Maher 0-1.		P Dynan 0-6, B Hogan 1-1, S Carroll 1-0, M Minogue 0-2, W O'Reilly 0-1.	Referee: T Doran (Carrick)

== Championship statistics ==
=== Top scorers ===
Rank	Player	Club	Tally	Total	Matches	Average
1	Jimmy Doyle	Thurles Sarsfields	1-10	13	2	6.50
1	Pat Dynan	Roscrea	0-13	13	2	6.50
3	Phil Shanahan	Toomevara	2-05	11	2	5.50
4	Seán McLoughlin	Thurles Sarsfields	3-01	10	2	5.00
5	T. O'Dwyer	Moycarkey–Borris	3-00	9	2	4.50
