= 1909 Tipperary Senior Hurling Championship =

Annual hurling competition season

- Champions: Thurles (6th title)
- Runners-up: Racecourse/Grangemockler

The 1909 Tipperary Senior Hurling Championship was the 20th staging of the Tipperary Senior Hurling Championship since its establishment by the Tipperary County Board in 1887.

Thurles were the defending champions.

Thurles won the championship after a 10–04 to 5–02 defeat of Racecourse/Grangemockler in the final. It was their sixth championship title overall and their fourth title in succession.
