= 1956 Tipperary Senior Hurling Championship =

Annual hurling competition season

- Dates: 9 September – 30 September 1956
- Teams: 4
- Champions: Thurles Sarsfields (19th title); Mickey Byrne (captain)
- Runners-up: Lorrha; Mick Brophy (captain)

Tournament statistics
- Matches played: 3
- Goals scored: 22 (7.33 per match)
- Points scored: 34 (11.33 per match)

The 1956 Tipperary Senior Hurling Championship was the 65th staging of the Tipperary Senior Hurling Championship since its establishment by the Tipperary County Board in 1887. The championship ran from 9 September to 30 September 1956.

Thurles Sarsfields were the defending champions.

The final was played on 30 September 1956 at Thurles Sportsfield, between Thurles Sarsfields and Lorrha, in what was their first ever meeting in the final. Thurles Sarsfields won the match by 3–07 to 1–04 to claim their 19th championship title overall and a second consecutive title.

== Qualification ==
Championship	Champions
Mid Tipperary Senior Hurling Championship	Thurles Sarsfields
North Tipperary Senior Hurling Championship	Borris–Ileigh
South Tipperary Senior Hurling Championship	Pádraig Pearses
West Tipperary Senior Hurling Championship	Knockavilla–Donaskeigh Kickhams

== Results ==
=== Semi-finals ===
9 September 1956 Semi-final	Thurles Sarsfields	6-05 - 5-04	Knockavilla–Donaskeigh Kickhams	Leahy Park

16 September 1956 Semi-final	Lorrha	5-08 - 2-06	Pádraig Pearses	Thurles Sportsfield

=== Final ===
30 September 1956 Final	Thurles Sarsfields	3-07 - 1-04	Lorrha	Thurles Sportsfield
