= 1962 Tipperary Senior Hurling Championship =

Annual hurling competition season

- Dates: 16 September – 14 October 1962
- Teams: 6
- Champions: Thurles Sarsfields (24th title); Michael McElgunn (captain)
- Runners-up: Moycarkey-Borris; Pat Ryan (captain)

Tournament statistics
- Matches played: 5
- Goals scored: 18 (3.6 per match)
- Points scored: 78 (15.6 per match)
- Top scorer(s): Tom Moloughney (2–09)

The 1962 Tipperary Senior Hurling Championship was the 71st staging of the Tipperary Senior Hurling Championship since its establishment by the Tipperary County Board in 1887. The championship ran from 16 September to 14 October 1962.

Thurles Sarsfields were the defending champions.

The final was played on 14 October 1962 at Thurles Sportsfield, between Thurles Sarsfields and Moycarkey–Borris, in what was their first ever meeting in the final. Thurles Sarsfields won the match by 1–07 to 1–06 to claim their 24th championship title overall and a second consecutive title.

Tom Moloughney was the championship's top scorer with 2–09.

== Qualification ==
Championship	Champions	Second team
Mid Tipperary Senior Hurling Championship	Thurles Sarsfields	Moycarkey–Borris
North Tipperary Senior Hurling Championship	Toomevara	Kilruane MacDonaghs
South Tipperary Senior Hurling Championship	Marlfield	n/a
West Tipperary Senior Hurling Championship	Cappawhite	n/a

== Results ==
=== Quarter-finals ===
16 September 1962 Quarter-final	Marlfield	2-06 - 1-14	Moycarkey–Borris	Clonmel GAA Ground
	A English 1-2, M Ryan 1-0, T English 0-2, G McCarthy 0-1, M O'Connor 0-1.		P Coman 1-3, D Ryan 0-5, J Coman 0-4, T Wright 0-2.

23 September 1962 Quarter-final	Cappawhite	2-03 - 2-13	Kilruane MacDonaghs	Thurles Sportsfield
	P Lonergan 1-0, JJ White 1-0, J McGrath 0-2, TJ McGrath 0-1.		T Moloughney 2-6, J McCarthy 0-2, G Hogan 0-2, L Gaynor 0-1, S Williams 0-1, L Tierney 0-1.

=== Semi-finals ===
30 September 1962 Semi-final	Thurles Sarsfields	4-10 - 2-07	Kilruane MacDonaghs	Thurles Sportsfield
	S McLoughlin 3-0, P Doyle 0-5, P Dorney 1-1, M Maher 0-2, L Keane 0-1, K Houlihan 0-1.		H Tooher 1-1, L Tierney 1-0, T Moloughney 0-3, J Gibson 0-1, M Fahy 0-1, J McCarthy 0-1.

30 September 1962 Semi-final	Toomevara	1-07 - 2-05	Moycarkey–Borris	Thurles Sportsfield
	P Cummins 1-0, M O'Gara 0-2, T Ryan 0-1, F Ryan 0-1, P Shanahan 0-1, R Ryan 0-1, J Haugh 0-1.		T Wright 1-1, L Hennessy 1-0, D Ryan 0-3, P Coman 0-1.

=== Final ===
14 October 1962 Final	Thurles Sarsfields	1-07 - 1-06	Moycarkey–Borris	Thurles Sportsfield
	M Murphy 1-0, P Doyle 0-3, L Keane 0-2, T Walsh 0-1, J Doyle 0-1.		P Coleman 1-1, D Ryan 0-3, W Shanahan 0-1, T Wright 0-1.

== Championship statistics ==
=== Top scorers ===
Rank	Player	Club	Tally	Total	Matches	Average
1	Tom Moloughney	Kilruane MacDonaghs	2-09	15	2	7.50
2	Paddy Coman	Moycarkey–Borris	2-05	11	3	3.66
2	Donal Ryan	Moycarkey–Borris	0-11	11	3	3.66
4	Seán McLoughlin	Thurles Sarsfields	3-00	9	2	4.50
5	Paddy Doyle	Thurles Sarsfields	0-08	8	2	4.00
