= Dundrum, County Tipperary =

Village in County Tipperary, Ireland

Dundrum Dún Droma
- Village
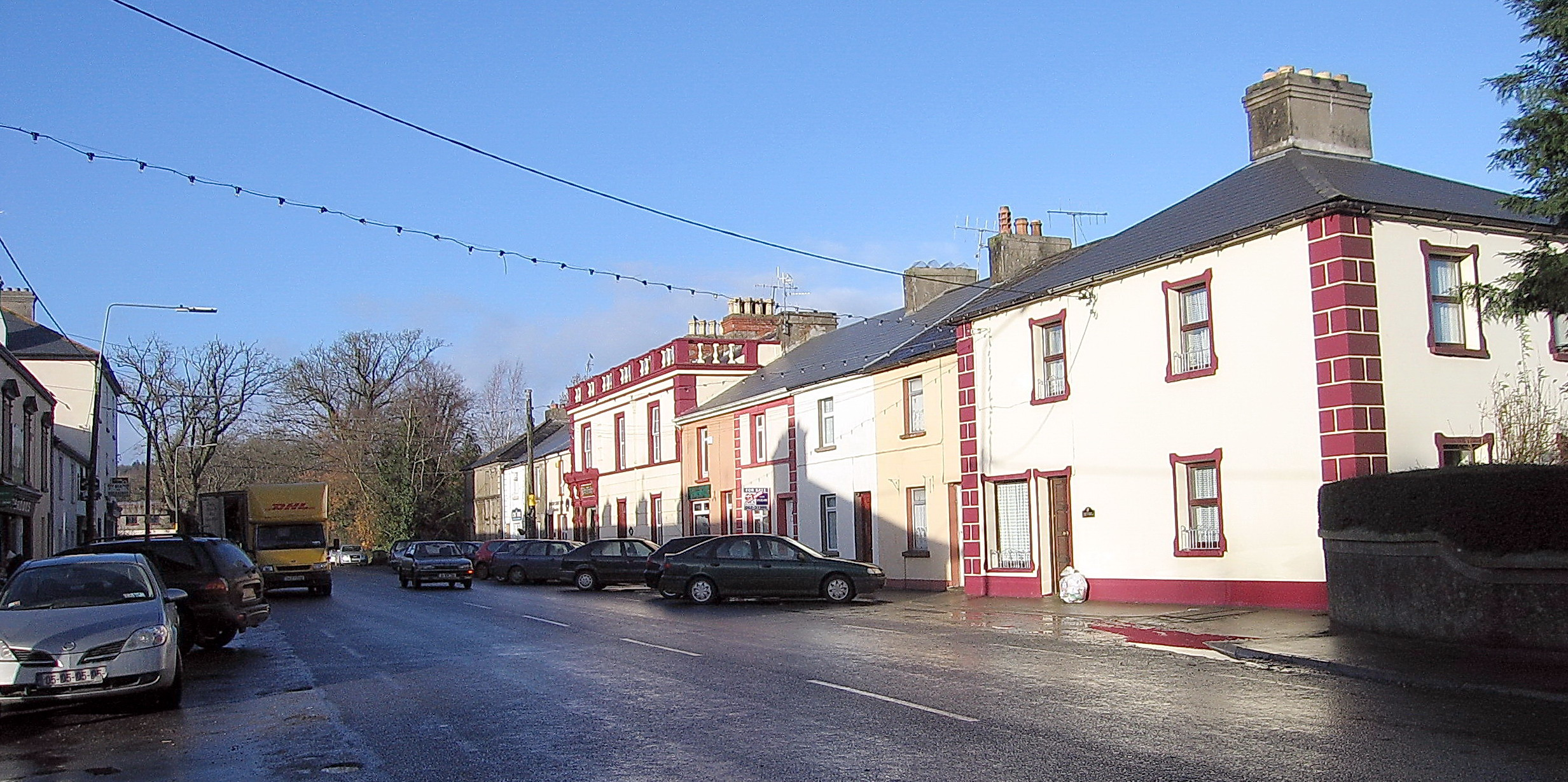
- Main Street

- Location in Ireland
- Coordinates: 52°33′37″N 8°02′39″W
- Country: Ireland
- Province: Munster
- County: Tipperary

Population (2022)
  - Total: 221

Dundrum (Irish: Dún Droma, meaning 'fort of the ridge') is a village and townland in County Tipperary, Ireland. At the 2022 census, the village population was 221. Dundrum is in the barony of Kilnamanagh Lower.

== Location and access ==
Dundrum village lies in the townland of the same name, one of eight in the civil parish of Ballintemple. It is in the Electoral Division of Kilpatrick, in the barony of Kilnamanagh Lower, in County Tipperary.

The village itself is at the junction of the R505 and R661 roads, 14 km (8.7 mi) north-west of Cashel and 14 km (8.7 mi) north-east of Tipperary Town.

The old Main Street (on the R505 road to Cashel) is in the eastern end of village and is the site of some new housing developments. Dundrum House Hotel and Golf Course is connected to the village by an avenue lined by mature lime trees on the Cashel Road.

The other main housing estate is near the railway station at the western end of the village where the R661 road to Tipperary Town leaves the R505.

=== Transport ===
The main Dublin to Cork railway line passes through the village, though the railway station is no longer in use. The station opened on 3 April 1848, but finally closed on 6 September 1976.

Bus Éireann route 332 provides one service each way on Saturdays only from the village to Limerick via Newport.

== Amenities ==
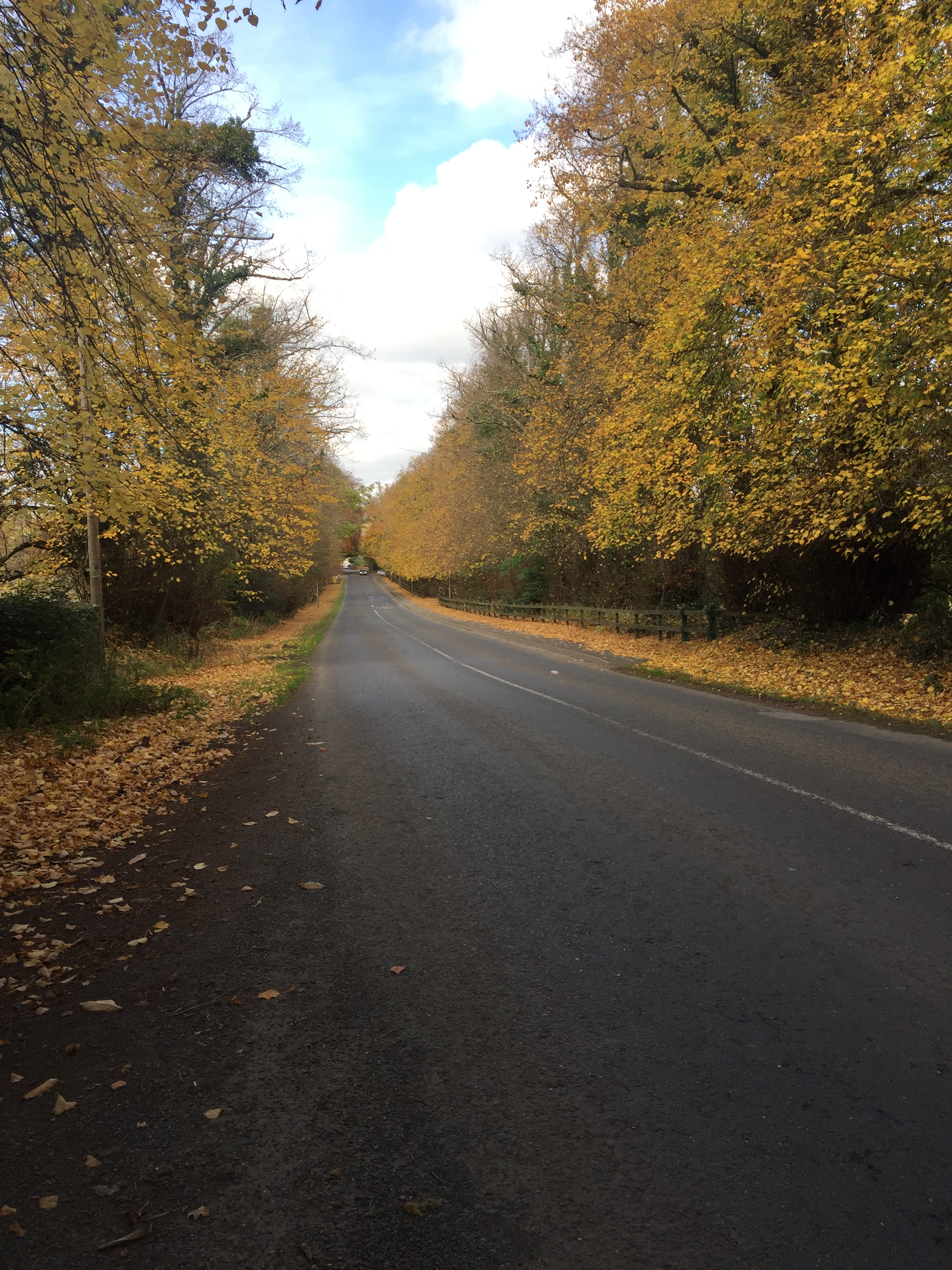
Lime Avenue between Dundrum Village on the Cashel Road, leading towards Dundrum House

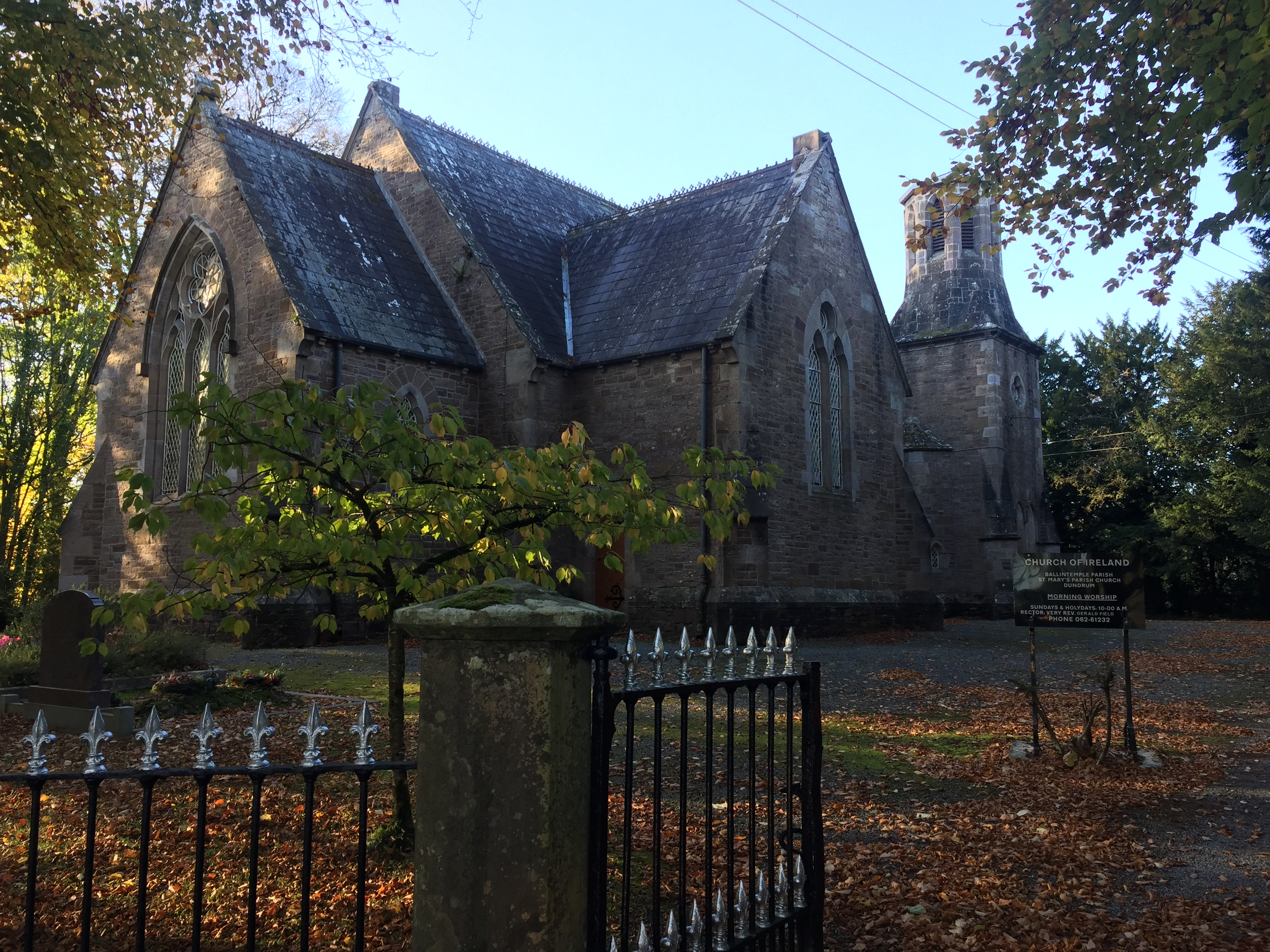
St Mary's Church, Dundrum Village, Tipperary.Church of Ireland Parish of Ballintemple, part of Cashel Union of Parishes. Located on the Cashel Road into Dundrum Village.

Between the main street and station is an industrial and retail area which includes a former sawmill, a steelworks and other enterprises. Dundrum has a filling station, hardware store, two grocery shops (incl a deli), a butchers, post office, creche, doctors surgery, pharmacy, pub, garden centre and a number of veterinary businesses.

Dundrum has a Church of Ireland church, St Mary's Church, located on the corner of the Green Road and Cashel Road. The nearest Roman Catholic church and primary school is in the neighbouring village of Knockavilla (in the parish of Knockavilla and Donaskeigh).

Today there is no primary school within the village itself, the former national school on the Tipperary Road having closed in the 1960s. The school house in Dundrum village was linked to the Church of Ireland church, and the building also housed the village court house.

The Church of Ireland church, is a legacy of the former landlord, (Cornwallis Maude, Viscount Hawarden) efforts to build a planned village in the 1800s together with the aforementioned railway station and the now restored as dwellings former, Royal Irish Constabulary (later Garda) station. The planned village saw the move of the Parish of Ballintemple and the building of a new church at the current location on the corner of the Cashel road and Green road on the edge of the village. The former rectory on the Cashel Road into Dundrum was sold in the late 1970s, when the Parish of Ballintemple became part of a group of parishes with Tipperary Parish. This group of parishes later became a Union with Cashel. The rectory building then became a hotel, which was later closed.

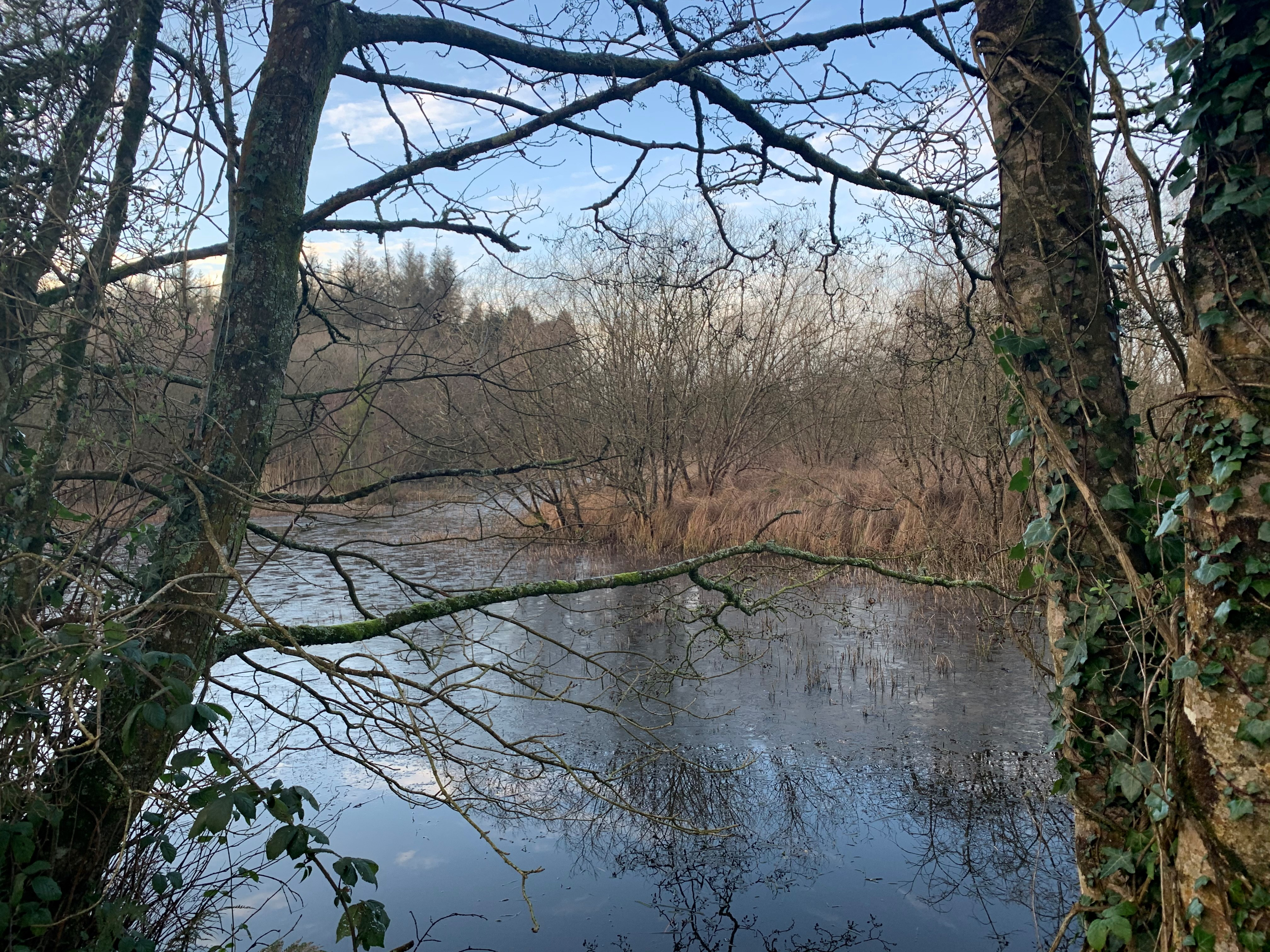
Overlooking some of the ponds at the Marl Bog in Dundrum, County Tipperary

Just outside the village on the Dundrum to Tipperary town Road there is the "Marl Bog", known locally as the Duck Pond. This mixed wooded area has a number of walking trails.

== Sports ==
The local GAA club is Knockavilla–Donaskeigh Kickhams GAA, whose grounds are in the village.

There is a running track, which is used by the villages athletic club, Dundrum Athletics.

A scout hall is located beside the running track, the village is also home to Dundrum International Scouts Campsite located near the village in bishop's wood.

Dundrum Athletic Club is the local athletics club. The club was formed in 1960 and celebrated its 50th anniversary in 2010. The club uses the local forestry, roads and the scout centre in the village for training. The club invested in a 250-meter floodlight gritted athletics track, long jump, high jump and shot put area. The club held the title of County and Munster Novice and Intermediate Club Cross Country Champions in 2010.

=== Famous horse ===
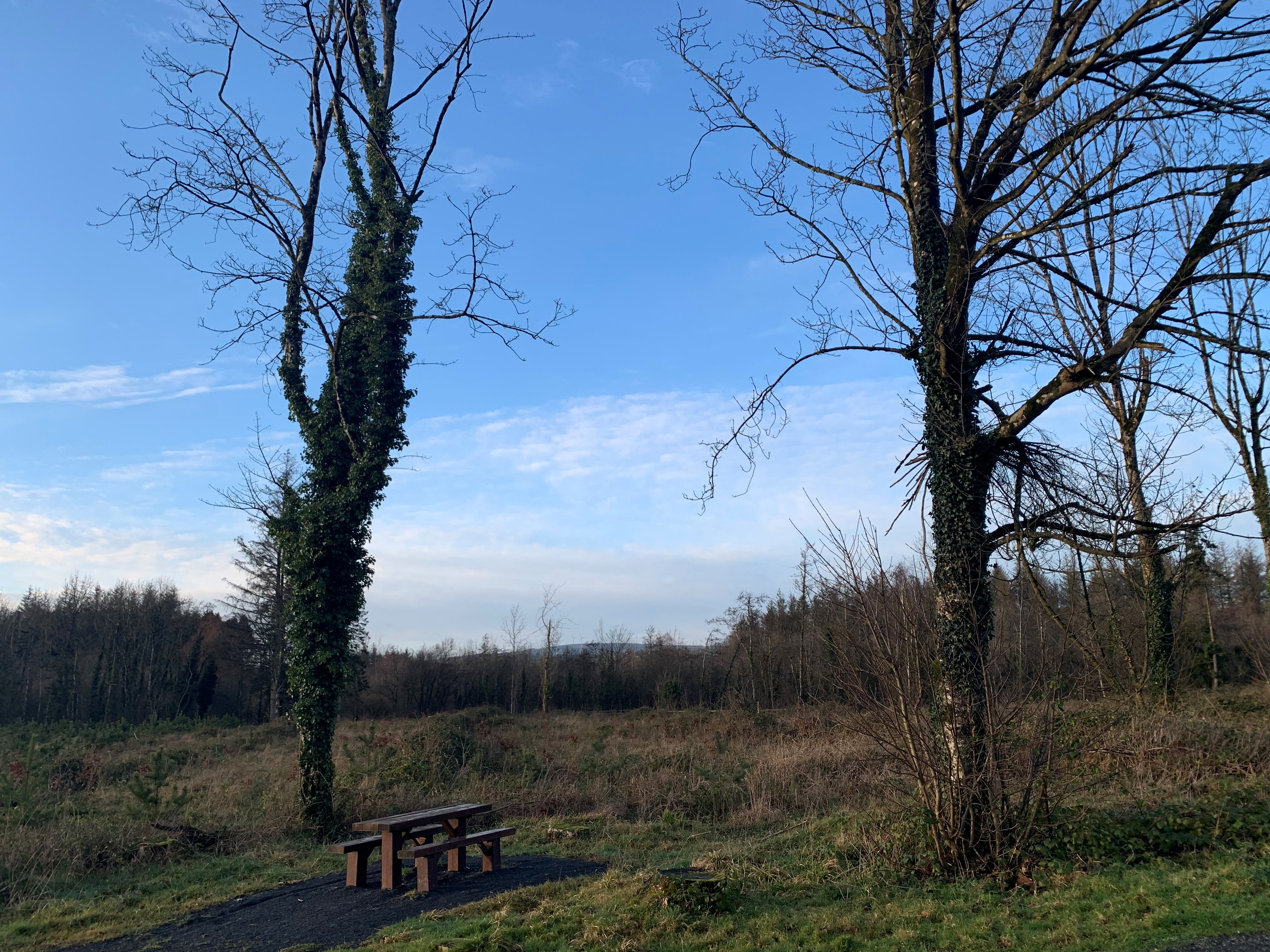
Replanting at the Marl Bog, Dundrum Tipperary after Storm Darwin

A Connemara gelding called 'Dundrum' ridden by Tommy Wade was a notable champion showjumper. Local farmer Jack Ryan {Lar} of Gurtussa owned the horse when its talent was recognised. He passed through several owners until coming to the stables of Tommy Wade of Goold's Cross and from there it went on to jump in places like the RDS. Though small in stature in keeping with its Connemara pedigree, Dundrum excelled in the puissance wall event in Ireland and Britain. In the early 1960s, Dundrum won several events, including at Wembley.

Dundrum became Supreme Champion at the Wembley Horse of the Year Show when he set a record by clearing a 7’2" puissance wall. In 1961 he was regarded as show jumper of the century when he won five major events at the Dublin Horse Show, the first time in history that so many awards were won by the same rider, and he did it with the same horse! He was International Jumping Champion from 1959–1963.

Dundrum was mentioned in a discourse in Dáil Éireann in 1970, when then TD Richard Barry stated that "combinations like Tommy Wade and Dundrum [..] made this country world famous and that brought delight to our people".

== Dundrum meteorite ==
On 12 August 1865 a meteorite (later called "Dundrum") was observed falling in Clonoulty, about 5 km (3.1 mi) north of Dundrum Village. The meteorite was an ordinary chondrite H5 and it is currently stored at the Natural History Museum in London. It was the last meteorite rock recovered in Ireland until 1999, when parts of the Leighlinbridge meteorite were located in Leighlinbridge, County Carlow.

== People ==
- Lady Clementina Hawarden (1822-1865) was a respected photographer of her time; and some of her early work took place on the family estate at Dundrum and is now part of the collections of the Victoria and Albert museum in London.

== See also ==
- List of towns and villages in Ireland
