= 1957 Tipperary Senior Hurling Championship =

Annual hurling competition season

- Dates: 18 August – 15 September 1957
- Teams: 4
- Champions: Thurles Sarsfields (20th title); Larry Keane (captain)
- Runners-up: Na Piarsaigh; Paddy Hennessy (captain)

Tournament statistics
- Matches played: 3
- Goals scored: 22 (7.33 per match)
- Points scored: 49 (16.33 per match)
- Top scorer(s): Paddy Kenny (3–02); Larry Keane (2–05)

The 1957 Tipperary Senior Hurling Championship was the 66th staging of the Tipperary Senior Hurling Championship since its establishment by the Tipperary County Board in 1887. The championship ran from 18 August to 15 September 1957.

Thurles Sarsfields were the defending champions.

The final was played on 15 September 1957 at Thurles Sportsfield, between Thurles Sarsfields and first-time finalists Na Piarsaigh. Thurles Sarsfields won the match by 4–15 to 4–04 to claim their 20th championship title overall and a third consecutive title.

== Qualification ==
Championship	Champions
Mid Tipperary Senior Hurling Championship	Thurles Sarsfields
North Tipperary Senior Hurling Championship	Nenagh Éire Óg
South Tipperary Senior Hurling Championship	Na Piarsaigh
West Tipperary Senior Hurling Championship	St Nicholas's

== Results ==
=== Semi-finals ===
18 August 1957 Semi-final	Na Piarsaigh	4-07 - 2-07	Nenagh Éire Óg	Thurles Sportsfield
	L Connolly 1-3, T ENglish 1-0, P Walsh 1-0, S Mackey 1-0, T Larkin 0-2, D Nealon 0-1, J Keating 0-1.		J McGrath 1-2, B O'Brien 1-0, P Hallinan 0-2, S Duignan 0-1, K McDonnell 0-1, J Hogan 0-1.

25 August 1957 Semi-final	Thurles Sarsfields	6-15 - 2-01	St Nicholas's	Leahy Park
	L Keane 2-4, M Stapleton 3-0, P Kenny 1-2, M Maher 0-3, M Butler 0-2, J McLoughlin 0-2, B Harkin 0-1, R Reidy 0-1.		TJ McGrath 1-0, J Treacy 1-0, D Nolan 0-1.

=== Final ===
15 September 1957 Final	Thurles Sarsfields	4-15 - 4-04	Na Piarsaigh	Leahy Park
	J Doyle 0-8, M Butler 2-1, P Kenny 2-0, M Maher 0-3, R Reidy 0-1, L Keane 0-1, M Stapleton 0-1.		D Nelaon 2-1, T Larkin 1-2, W Waters 1-0, L Connolly 0-1.

== Championship statistics ==
=== Top scorers ===
Rank	Player	Club	Tally	Total	Matches	Average
1	Paddy Kenny	Thurles Sarsfields	3-02	11	2	5.50
1	Larry Keane	Thurles Sarsfields	2-05	11	2	5.50
3	Michael Stapleton	Thurles Sarsfields	2-03	9	2	4.50
4	Michael Butler	Thurles Sarsfields	3-02	11	2	5.50
5	Donie Nealon	Na Piarsaigh	2-02	8	2	4.00
5	Jimmy Doyle	Thurles Sarsfields	0-08	8	2	4.00
