= 1952 Tipperary Senior Hurling Championship =

Annual hurling competition season

- Dates: 24 August – 14 September 1952
- Teams: 4
- Champions: Thurles Sarsfields (17th title); Tommy Doyle (captain)
- Runners-up: Borris–Ileigh

Tournament statistics
- Matches played: 3
- Goals scored: 13 (4.33 per match)
- Points scored: 38 (12.67 per match)

The 1952 Tipperary Senior Hurling Championship was the 61st staging of the Tipperary Senior Hurling Championship since its establishment by the Tipperary County Board in 1887. The championship ran from 24 August to 14 September 1952.

Holycross–Ballycahill were the defending champions, however, they were beaten by Thurles Sarsfields in the Mid Tipperary SHC final.

The final was played on 14 September 1952 at MacDonagh Park in Nenagh, between Thurles Sarsfields and Borris–Ileigh, in what was their first ever meeting in the final. Thurles Sarsfields won the match by 5–06 to 1–08 to claim their 17th championship title overall and a first title in six years.

== Qualification ==
Championship	Champions
Mid Tipperary Senior Hurling Championship	Thurles Sarsfields
North Tipperary Senior Hurling Championship	Borris–Ileigh
South Tipperary Senior Hurling Championship	Carrick Swans
West Tipperary Senior Hurling Championship	Knockavilla Kickhams

== Results ==
=== Semi-finals ===
24 August 1952 Semi-final	Borris–Ileigh	1-07 - 2-01	Carrick Swans	Clonmel Sportsfield

31 August 1952 Semi-final	Thurles Sarsfields	3-10 - 1-06	Knockavilla Kickhams	Leahy Park

=== Final ===
14 September 1952 Final	Thurles Sarsfields	5-06 - 1-08	Borris–Ileigh	MacDonagh Park
