= 1959 Tipperary Senior Hurling Championship =

Annual hurling competition season

- Dates: 16 August – 23 August 1959
- Teams: 4
- Champions: Thurles Sarsfields (22nd title); Tony Wall (captain)
- Runners-up: Kilruane MacDonaghs; Gerry McCarthy (captain)

Tournament statistics
- Matches played: 3
- Goals scored: 20 (6.67 per match)
- Points scored: 49 (16.33 per match)
- Top scorer(s): Gerry McCarthy (1–09)

The 1959 Tipperary Senior Hurling Championship was the 68th staging of the Tipperary Senior Hurling Championship since its establishment by the Tipperary County Board in 1887. The championship ran from 16 August to 23 August 1959.

Thurles Sarsfields were the defending champions.

The final was played on 23 August 1959 at St Cronan's Park in Roscrea, between Thurles Sarsfields and Kilruane MacDonaghs, in what was their second meeting in the final overall. Thurles Sarsfields won the match by 3–12 to 2–06 to claim their 22nd championship title overall and a record-breaking fifth consecutive title.

Gerry McCarthy was the championship's top scorer with 1–09.

== Qualification ==
Championship	Champions
Mid Tipperary Senior Hurling Championship	Thurles Sarsfields
North Tipperary Senior Hurling Championship	Kilruane MacDonaghs
South Tipperary Senior Hurling Championship	Carrick Swans
West Tipperary Senior Hurling Championship	Knockavilla–Donaskeigh Kickhams

== Results ==
=== Semi-finals ===
16 August 1959 Semi-final	Kilruane MacDonaghs	4-12 - 5-02	Knockavilla–Donaskeigh Kickhams	MacDonagh Park
	T Moloughney 2-2, G Hogan 1-2, G McCarthy 0-5, S Williams 1-0, J McCarthy 0-2, V Tierney 0-1.		JJ McCormack 2-0, P Cleary 1-0, E Purcell 1-0, J Mulooley 0-1.

16 August 1959 Semi-final	Thurles Sarsfields	6-14 - 0-03	Carrick Swans	Clonmel GAA Ground
	M McElgunn 2-1, J Moloughney 2-1, J Doyle 0-7, L Keane 2-0, N Murphy 0-2, P Dorney 0-2, N Maher 0-1.		P Delaney 0-1, W Waters 0-1, J Waters 0-1.

=== Final ===
23 August 1959 Final	Thurles Sarsfields	3-12 - 2-06	Kilruane MacDonaghs	St Cronan's Park
	P Dorney 1-2, J Doyle 0-4, M McElgunn 1-0, J McLoughlin 1-0, L Keane 0-3, M Maher 0-2, R Reidy 0-1.		G McCarthy 1-4, T McLoughney 1-0, S Williams 0-1, G Hogan 0-1.	Referee: S Dwyer (West)

== Championship statistics ==
=== Top scorers ===
Rank	Player	Club	Tally	Total	Matches	Average
1	Gerry McCarthy	Kilruane MacDonaghs	1-09	12	2	6.00
2	Tom Moloughney	Kilruane MacDonaghs	3-02	11	2	5.50
2	Jimmy Doyle	Thurles Sarsfields	0-11	11	2	5.50
4	Michael McElgunn	Thurles Sarsfields	3-01	10	2	5.00
5	Larry Keane	Thurles Sarsfields	2-03	9	2	4.50
