= Knockavilla–Donaskeigh Kickhams GAA =

Irish Gaelic Athletic Association club

Knockavilla–Donaskeigh Kickhams
- Cnoc an Bhile–Ciceamaigh Dhún na Sciach
- County: Tipperary
- Colours: Black and Amber
- Grounds: Páirc Ciocaim
- Coordinates: 52°33′36.70″N 8°03′06.10″W

Playing kits
Standard colours

Knockavilla–Donaskeigh Kickhams GAA is a Gaelic Athletic Association club located in Dundrum, County Tipperary in Ireland. The club participates in both Gaelic football and hurling competitions organised by Tipperary GAA. The club is a part of West Tipperary GAA.

== History ==
The club was formed in 1935 when Knockavilla, Donaskeigh and Dundrum amalgamated to form the Kickham club. This meeting is believed to have been taken place at the newly built Chaplain's house at the Convent Cross. The first officers were President - Rev Fr. Michael Quinlan, Chairman – Sean O’Dwyer, Vice-chairman – Paddy Cleary, Secretary – Con McCarthy, Treasurer – Michael Ryan (D).

In that first year the club won the West Senior Hurling Championship and again three years later in 1938. The club won twelve further west senior hurling titles between 1946 and 1960. One player who was a member of all twelve of these winning teams was John Farrell. Between 1943 and 1947 the club also won five minor titles, Heelan played on all of these 5 minor teams

After the success of the previous two decades the 1960s saw a decline in the club's fortunes until 1966 when a west under 21 hurling title was won and retained again in 1967 and the club's first county title was claimed.

The 1970s and 1980s saw the emergence of the club as a dominant force in juvenile competition winning many underage titles in both hurling and football.

The late 1970s and 1990s saw this under age work bear fruit when the adult teams won West titles in Minor Hurling 1979,1984,1990–91, 1993, 1994, and 1999. County Intermediate Hurling 1992, U-21 West Hurling 1993, U-21 County Hurling 1994, West Junior Hurling 1987 and 1998. Before reclaiming The West Senior crown in 1997 and 1999.

Football titles were also won in 1979 Minor West 1981 Junior (county) U-21 1991(County). Minor 1992 (County) and 1999, Junior 1992. Intermediate 1985 and 1993 and 1996 (County). Senior Championship and league 1998.

In the 2000s (decade), the Minor and junior hurlers, Intermediate footballers have brought more titles back to the club.

== Kickham Park ==
Kickham Park, Dundrum was officially reopened on Sunday 11 May 2008.

The latest development of the facilities commenced in 1999 with the purchase of the wooded area adjacent to the field, This area was then cleared to facilitate a second pitch, We built two new dressing rooms and extended the facilities of the clubhouse. The final part of the development was the completion of the spectator stand and hurling wall.

On 11 May 2008, Tipperary played Limerick in a senior Hurling challenge match to mark the occasion.

The current field was purchased from Lysaght's sometime during 1957/58(approx) and developed over the following few years. The biggest job being in 1959, when the pitch was turned to its current position. Previously, the pitch ran in the other direction. Previous generations of club members have put a lot of hours into developing and draining the pitch over a number of decades.

== Honours ==
=== Hurling ===
- West Tipperary Senior Hurling Championship (17)
  - 1935, 1938, 1946, 1947, 1949, 1950, 1952, 1953, 1954, 1955, 1956, 1958, 1959, 1960, 1997, 1999, 2006.
- West Tipperary Senior hurling League: (13)
  - 1944 (Knockavilla only), 1947, 1949, 1951, 1954, 1957, 1977, 1982, 1993, 1995, 1998, 1999, 2006
- Tipperary Intermediate Hurling Championship (1)
  - 1992
- West Tipperary Intermediate Hurling Championship (1)
  - 1992,2020
- West Tipperary Junior Hurling Championship (9)
  - 1931 (as Knockavilla), 1932 (as Donaskeigh), 1941 (as Donaskeigh), 1981, 1987, 1998, 2005, 2013, 2015
- West Tipperary Junior B Hurling Championship (2)
  - 2007, 2010
- Tipperary Under-21 Hurling Championship: (2)
  - 1967, 1994
- West Tipperary Under-21 Hurling Championship: (6)
  - 1966, 1967, 1986, 1993, 1994, 2008
- West Tipperary Minor A Hurling Championship: (18)
  - 1941(with Golden as Invincibles), 1943, 1944, 1945, 1946, 1947, 1951, 1955, 1979, 1984, 1990, 1991, 1993, 1994, 1999, 2001, 2002, 2007, 2016
- West Tipperary Minor B Hurling Championship: (2)
  - 2001, 2015 2018 2021

County tipperary minor hurling championship (1)

**2021

- West Junior Hurling No. 2. Championship: (8)
  - 1947, 1948, 1950, 1951, 1952, 1968, 1971, 2007, 2010.

=== Football ===
- West Tipperary Senior Football Championship: (1)
  - 1998
- West Tipperary Senior Football League: (1)
  - 1998
- Tipperary Intermediate Football Championship (2)
  - 1996, 2002
- West Tipperary Intermediate Football Championship: (4)
  - 1985, 1993, 1996, 2002
- Tipperary Junior Football Championship (3)
  - 1981, 1992, 2009
- West Tipperary Junior Football Championship (4)
  - 1981, 1992, 2007, 2021
- Tipperary Under-21 B Football Championship (1)
  - 1991
- West Tipperary Under-21 B Football Championship (2)
  - 1991, 2013
- West Tipperary Minor A Football Championship (2)
  - 1979, 1999
- Tipperary Minor B Football Championship (1)
  - 1992
- West Tipperary Minor B Football Championship (2)
  - 1992, 2005, 2006

== Notable players ==
- David Butler (Kerry)
- John Farrell
- Brian Horgan
- Fergal Horgan (referee)
- Donal O'Brien
