= Thurles Sarsfields GAA =

Gaelic games club in County Tipperary, Ireland

Thurles Sarsfields
- Na Sáirséalaigh Dhurlais Éile
- Founded: 1881
- County: Tipperary
- Nickname: The Blues
- Colours
- Grounds: The Outside Field
- Coordinates: 52°40′56.52″N 7°49′22.79″W

Playing kits
Home Kit	Change Kit

Senior Club Championships
	All Ireland	Munster champions	Tipperary champions
Hurling:	0	1	37

Thurles Sarsfields GAA Club is a Gaelic Athletic Association club located in Thurles, County Tipperary, Ireland. The club is affiliated to the Mid Tipperary Board and the Tipperary County Board. Thurles Sarsfields fields teams in both hurling and Gaelic football.

== Foundation ==
Located in the town of Thurles in mid-County Tipperary, records regarding the exact date of the foundation of the club do not exist. Several dates have been suggested, with 1881 being the most commonly accepted, some three years before the foundation of the Gaelic Athletic Association. Hurling had been played in the area long before this, with reports of an early patron of the town, Lord Matthew, Earl of Llandaff, having his own private team. Games were played between competing Earls of the time with Thurles noted for being a strong outfit.

== History ==
Thurles were the inaugural Tipperary SHC winners in 1887, having beaten a North Selection by 0–03 to 0–00 in the final. As the Tipperary inter-county representatives, Thurles also won the inaugural All-Ireland SHC titles in 1887, following a defeat of Galway in the 1887 All-Ireland SHC final.

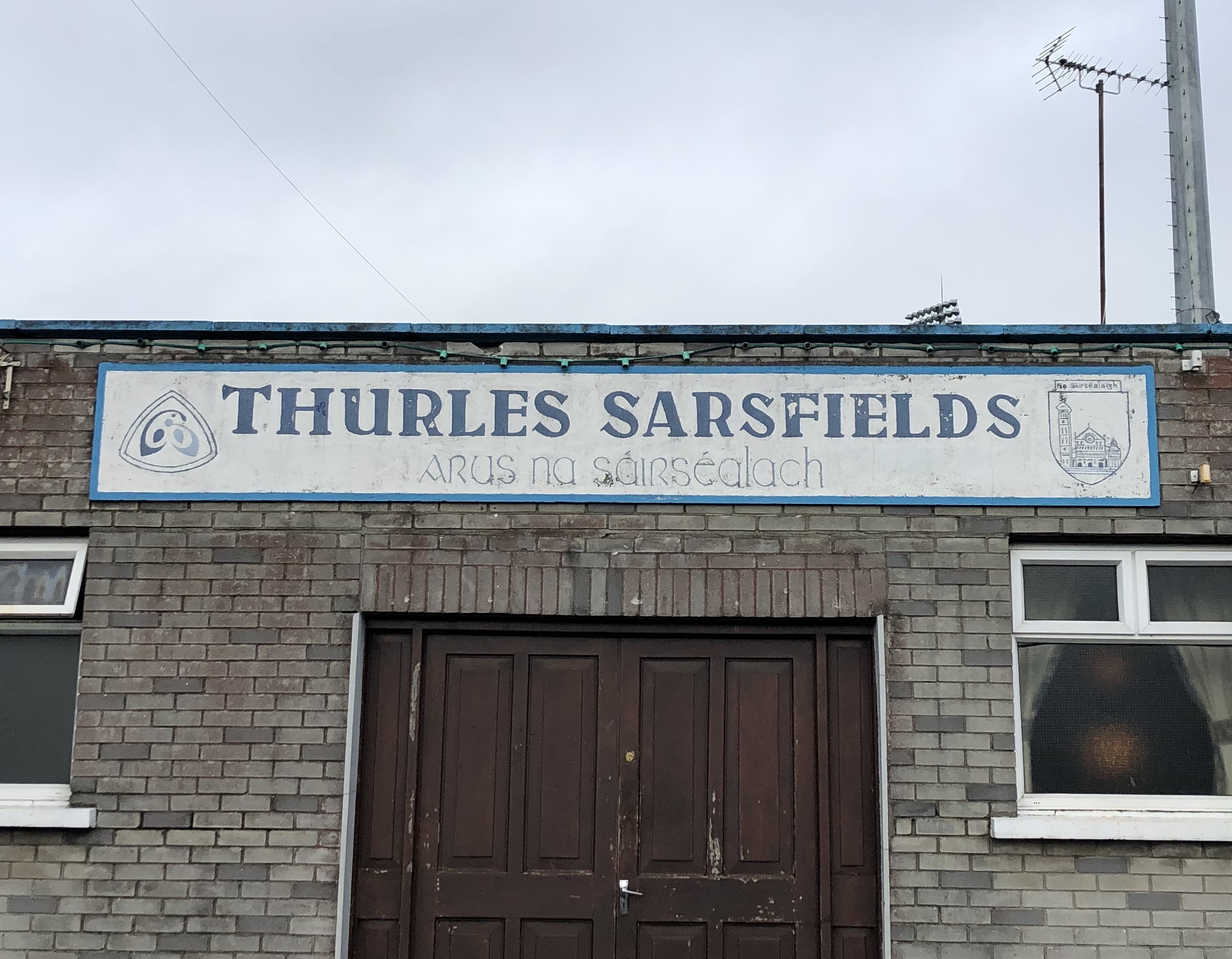
Clubhouse at Semple Stadium

The early years of the 20th century saw the Thurles club dominate at local and national level. Six Tipperary SHC titles were won in the eight seasons between 1904 and 1911 and, as the Tipperary inter-county representatives, Tom Semple lead Thurles to All-Ireland SHC title wins in 1906 and 1908, following defeats of Dublin on both occasions. By that stage, the club became known as Thurles Blues after changing from their original colours of green and gold.

An 18-year title drought was ended in 1929, when Jack Stapleton captained Thurles to a 4–03 to 1–03 win over Toomevara in the final. This title win began an unprecedented 45-year period of dominance, with the club winning nine Tipperary SHC titles between 1935 and 1952 to firmly establish itself at the top of the all-time roll of honour. Thurles Sarsfields set a new record by winning five consecutive Tipperary SHC titles between 1955 and 1959, with players such as Tony Wall and Larry Keane. After being beaten by Toomevara in 1960, Thurles Sarsfields returned to win a second set of five consecutive Tipperary SHC titles between 1961 and 1965, with Mickey Byrne setting the all-time record by claiming 14 winners' medals. A decade passed before Jimmy Doyle captained the club to their 28th Tipperary SHC title in 1974. The club's juvenile section, Dúrlas Óg, was established in 1979.

After dominating the Tipperary SHC for nearly half a century, it would be 29 years before a Ger O'Grady-captained Thurles Sarsfields team won their 29th title, after beating Drom & Inch by 1–17 to 0–15 in the 2005 final. Further such titles were won in 2009, 2010 and 2012, before Thurles Sarsfields won the Munster Club SHC title in 2012, after a 1–21 to 1–16 win over De La Salle in the final. The club claimed four consecutive Tipperary SHC titles bewteen 2014 and 2017, with Pádraic Maher captaining the team to three of these title wins. Thurles Sarsfields won their 37th Tipperary SHC title in 2026, after beating Moycarkey–Borris by 1–19 to 1–11.

== Honours ==
- Munster Senior Club Hurling Championship (1): 2012
- Tipperary Senior Hurling Championship (37): 1887, 1904, 1906, 1907, 1908, 1909, 1911, 1929, 1935, 1936, 1938, 1939, 1942, 1944, 1945, 1946, 1952, 1955, 1956, 1957, 1958, 1959, 1961, 1962, 1963, 1964, 1965, 1974, 2005, 2009, 2010, 2012, 2014, 2015, 2016, 2017, 2026
- Mid Tipperary Senior Hurling Championship (46): 1907, 1908, 1909, 1911, 1912, 1915, 1920 (as Moycarkey-Thurles), 1925, 1929, 1935, 1936, 1938, 1939, 1942, 1944, 1945, 1946, 1950, 1952, 1955, 1956, 1957, 1958, 1959, 1960, 1961, 1962, 1963, 1964, 1965, 1968, 1969, 1973, 1975, 1979, 1980, 1993, 1996, 2000, 2001, 2005, 2007, 2010, 2012, 2015, 2017
- Mid Tipperary Senior Football Championship (1): 1952
- Tipperary Intermediate Football Championship (1): 2025
- Mid Tipperary Intermediate Football Championship (7): 1990, 1991, 1994, 1999, 2000, 2006, 2009, 2025
- Mid Tipperary Intermediate Hurling Championship (3): 1989, 2014, 2016
- Tipperary Junior A Hurling Championship (5): 1955, 1956, 1958, 1987, 1995
- Tipperary Junior A Football Championship (2): 1989, 2022
- Mid Tipperary Junior A Hurling Championship (12): 1939, 1942, 1948, 1955, 1956, 1957, 1958, 1981, 1987, 1994, 1995, 2014, 2019
- Mid Tipperary Junior A Football Championship (10): 1943, 1945, 1967, 1983, 1985, 1989, 1998, 2015, 2021, 2022
- All-Ireland Junior B Club Hurling Championship (1): 2018
- Tipperary Junior B Hurling Championship (3): 2002, 2010, 2017
- Mid Tipperary Junior B Hurling Championship (4): 2002, 2009, 2010, 2017
- Mid Tipperary Junior B Football Championship (1): 1995
- Tipperary Under-21 A Hurling Championship (8): 1988, 2002, 2008, 2009, 2012, 2013, 2015, 2016
- Mid Tipperary Under-21 A Hurling Championship (23): 1961, 1968, 1969, 1970, 1974, 1976, 1980, 1988, 1989, 1990, 1992, 1995, 1997, 2002, 2003, 2006, 2008, 2009, 2010, 2012, 2013, 2015, 2016
- Mid Tipperary Under-21 A Football Championship (3): 1991, 1993, 2007
- Mid Tipperary Under 19 B Football Championship (1): 2022
- Tipperary Minor A Hurling Championship (11): 1954, 1955, 1956, 1957, 1973, 1985, 1999, 2000, 2001, 2006, 2007, 2010
- Tipperary Minor A Football Championship (2): 2005, 2006
- Mid Tipperary Minor A Hurling Championship (21): 1954, 1955, 1956, 1957, 1958, 1967, 1973, 1980, 1985, 1987, 1988, 1989, 1992, 1994, 1995, 1999, 2001, 2001, 2006, 2007, 2010
- Mid Tipperary Minor A Football Championship (10): 1949, 1953, 1954, 1983, 1988, 1989, 1993, 2005, 2006, 2019
- Mid Tipperary Minor B Football Championship (1): 1991

== Notable players ==
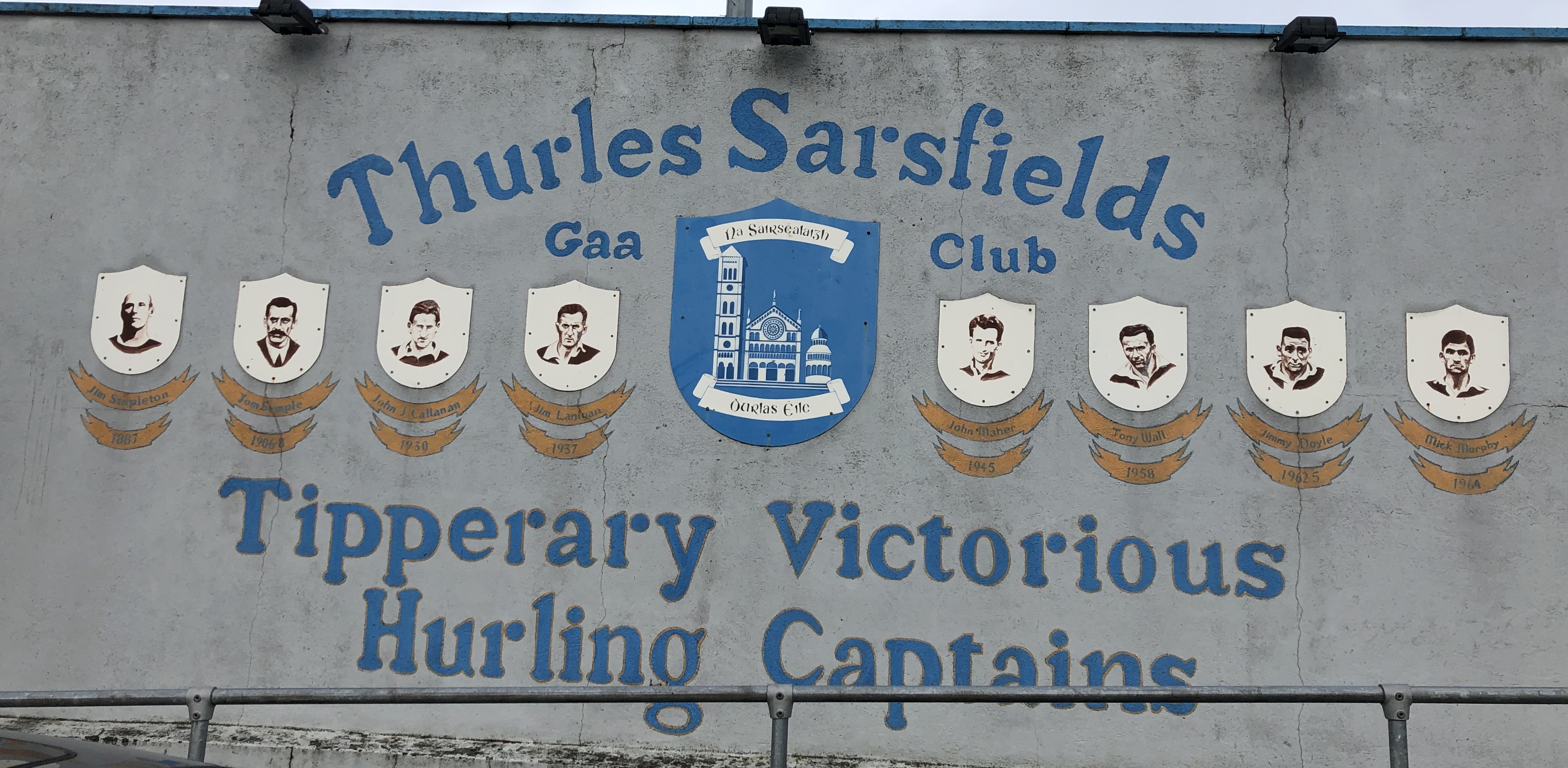
Wall depicting all the All-Ireland SHC-winning captains that have come from the club.

- Jim Stapleton: All-Ireland SHC-winning captain (1887)
- Tom Semple: All-Ireland SHC-winning captain (1906, 1908)
- John Joe Callanan: All-Ireland SHC-winning captain (1930)
- Jimmy Lanigan: All-Ireland SHC-winning captain (1937)
- John Maher: All-Ireland SHC-winning captain (1945)
- Tony Wall: All-Ireland SHC-winning captain (1958)
- Jimmy Doyle: All-Ireland SHC-winning captain (1962, 1965)
- Ronan Maher: All-Ireland SHC-winning captain (2025)
