= Cork–Tipperary hurling rivalry =

Cork-Tipperary
- Location: County Cork; County Tipperary
- Teams: Cork; Tipperary
- First meeting: Tipperary 2-2 - 0-00 Cork; 1888 Munster quarter-final (27 May 1888)
- Latest meeting: Cork 0-29 - 1-22 Tipperary; 2026 Munster Championship (19 April 2026)
- Next meeting: TBD

Statistics
- Total meetings: 94
- Most player appearances: Christy Ring (17)
- Top scorer: Christy Ring (8-50)
- All-time series: Championship: Cork 44-40 Tipperary (8 draws)
- Largest victory: Cork 4-16 - 0-2 Tipperary; 1897 Munster quarter-final (31 July 1898)

The Cork-Tipperary rivalry is a hurling rivalry between Irish county teams Cork and Tipperary, who first played each other in 1741 in a field in the townland of Kildinan near Rathcormac in County Cork and in the Championship for the first time in 1888. It is considered to be one of the biggest rivalries in Gaelic games. Cork's home ground is Páirc Uí Chaoimh and Tipperary's home ground is Semple Stadium.

While Cork have the highest number of Munster titles and Tipperary are ranked second on the roll of honour, they are also two of the most successful teams in the All-Ireland Senior Hurling Championship, having won 59 championship titles between them to date.

Regarded as two of hurling's "big three", with Kilkenny making up the trio, a Munster final between Cork and Tipperary is regarded as a special occasion. It is the most common Munster final pairing.

== History ==
=== 1942: the first back door champions ===
When Tipperary and Cork faced each other on 12 July 1942 there was a unique feature to the contest. It was the first time in championship hurling that the All Ireland Champions (Cork) met provincial champions (Tipperary) in the following year's championship. The explanation was that Tipperary had to withdraw from the 1941 Munster Championship, because of the foot and mouth epidemic. Cork won the All Ireland title in September but when the Munster final was subsequently played, Tipperary beat the Leesiders in Limerick on 26 October by 5-4 to 2-5. The All Ireland champions, captained by Jack Lynch, were easy winners on a 4-15 to 4-1 scoreline.

=== 1949–1961: the greatest era ===
They were part of one of the greatest sports rivalries
of all time, one of those which, like Frazier verus Ali,
Borg versus McEnroe, or Kerry versus Dublin, means
that the name of the contestants will be forever intertwined.

— Éamonn Sweeney writing in Munster Hurling Legends.

Cork and Tipperary's modern rivalry reached its peak during twelve years of epochal meetings spanning three decades, the first of which took place on 29 May 1949 in front of a then record crowd of 34,702 for a Munster quarter-final. By this stage Tipperary had fallen on hard times, having been eclipsed by the great Limerick and Cork teams of the previous two decades, and had won just three of the previous twenty All-Ireland titles. Cork still had some survivors from the four-in-a-row era, while Tipperary had a relatively young and inexperienced team. For most of the match it looked as if youth would trump experience and with only a few minutes to spare they were ahead by 3-10 to 2-9. A solo effort from Jack Lynch, who by now was a TD, from his usual midfield berth resulted in a goal and brought his personal tally to 1-6. A point from Bernie Murphy levelled the scores at the death.

The replay four weeks later was a classic. John Doyle made his championship debut and began one of the longest and most distinguished of all inter-county careers. A Gerry O'Riordan goal gave Cork a 1-2 to 0-2 at the intervals, however, Cork could have been further ahead but for a disallowed goal. Mossy O'Riordan sent a shot past Tipp 'keeper Tony Reddin, however, the sliotar appeared to rebound off the stanchion supporting the net before being cleared. In spite of Cork protesting the referee waved the play on. After five minutes of injury time Cork still led by 1-5 to 0-5, however, Jimmy Kennedy scored the equalising goal and the game headed for extra-time. Both sides took different approaches as extra-time was about to be played. Tipperary retired to their dressing room where the players refreshed themselves with a creamery churn full of cold water. Cork on the other hand remained out on the field in what was one of the warmest days ever recorded in Ireland. Tipperary took to the field a much fresher team and an early goal from Mick Ryan gave them the lead and they held out to win by 2-8 to 1-9. Tipp's Tommy Doyle, who earlier in the year ad been coaxed out of retirement, gave an inspired display by holding Cork's top marksman Christy Ring scoreless for the two drawn games and the period of extra time. The defeat brought Cork's decade of success to an end, as Willie "Long Puck" Murphy, Alan Lotty and Jim Young hung up their hurleys for the final time after the game.

There was an inevitability about the meeting of Cork and Tipperary in the 1950 Munster final, a game which marked a low point in the history of crowd-troubled games. The official attendance at Fitzgerald Stadium was given as 39,000, however, up to 50,000 saw the game as gates were broken down, walls were scaled at the pitch invaded with supporters. There were supporters on the pitch at the throw-in, while a Cork fan tried to strike Tipp's Seán Kenny. Despite the madness that was swirling all around them, the Tipperary and Cork players managed to produce an absolutely classic game of hurling. A Paddy Kenny goal helped Tipperary into a 1-13 to 1-6 half-time lead. The start of the second half was delayed by yet another pitch invasion, and when it finally got under way, Christy Ring dragged his team back into the contest by slaloming through the Tipp defence in typical style and rifling the ball the back of the net. As the match drifted away from their team the Cork fans grew more and more frustrated, and when a Jimmy Kennedy point put Tipperary 2-17 to 2-9 ahead with just ten minutes remaining, hundreds invaded the pitch from behind Tony Reddin's goal and forced referee Liam O'Donoghue to call a halt to the match. The goalkeeper had oranges and overcoats thrown at him as he carried out his duties and on one occasion a supporter held him by the jersey as he went to clear the sliotar. Every Cork score was greeted by a pitch invasion, while pleas from Jack Lynch and Christy Ring failed to quell them. Tipperary eventually won an anarchical game by 2-17 to 3-11.

Cork and Tipperary faced each other in the 1951 Munster final. The authorities were taking no chances of a repeat of the anarchy of the previous year with thousands of spectators missed one of the greatest games of all time by being locked outside the gates at the Gaelic Grounds. At half-time Tipperary led by 0-9 to 1-4, however, the restart saw Cork up the ante. Christy Ring gave an absolute exhibition of scoring, collecting possession, beating tackles and setting up attacks. Tipperary, however, never faltered in the wake of Ring's roaming presence. Playing out the final stages of the match in his bare feet Ring converted two more frees, however, Tipperary held on to win by 2-11 to 2-9.

"For the Doc ... For the Doc ...!!

— A blood-stained Christy Ring's words to Éamonn Young
following the conclusion of the 1952 Munster final as
Cork preserved their record of four-in-a-row. Young's
brother, Dr. Jim Young, was one of only nine players
to line out in all four finals.

In 1952 Cork stood in the way of Tipperary claiming a fourth successive Munster crown and an almost certain record-equalling fourth successive All-Ireland title. Cork had seven newcomers to their team as well as fourth-choice goalkeeper Dave Creedon. Tipperary looked to be the better side, scoring a soft goal after just three minutes and leading by 2-5 to 0-5 at the interval after playing against a very strong wind. Tony Reddin rebuffed Cork for almost two certain Cork goals as Tipperary had a four-point lead as the game entered the final quarter. Mossy O'Riordan burst through the Tipp defence, was fouled but carried on to fire in a shot that Liam Dowling steered into the net. The goal was allowed to stand as protests by the Tipp defenders fell on deaf ears. Cork added four points in-a-row while a late Gerry Doyle effort for Tipp flew inches over the crossbar. A narrow 1-11 to 2-7 score line gave Cork the victory and thwarted Tipperary's attempt at four-in-a-row.

For the fourth time in five years, the Munster final produced a Cork-Tipperary clash in 1953. 43,000 supporters packed into the Gaelic Grounds, with locked-out Cork fans breaking a gate to get in. Tipperary had the wind in the first half and had a 1-8 to 1-4 interval lead. Pat Stakelum put Tipperary five points clear, but the Tipp selectors made a mistake when switching Jimmy Finn off Josie Hartnett. A rejuvenated Hartnett fired in a shot which was finished to the net by Liam Dowling. Christy Ring finished the game with 1-8 as Cork produced one of the most impressive Munster final performances to win by 3-10 to 1-11.

More attendance records tumbled in 1954 as Cork and Tipperary met in another Munster final in front of 52,499. Tipp had a six-point lead at the interval, having played with a strong wind. They still had the lead, albeit a one-point lead, as the match moved into injury time. Christy Ring, although swarmed by three players, sent in a speculative cross which goalkeeper Tony Reddin fumbled. Paddy Barry was on hand to finish to the net. A point followed by Ring as Cork triumphed by 2-8 to 1-8.

After a one-year hiatus from the fixture, Cork and Tipperary met in the 1956 Munster semi-final. Cork overturned Tipp's eleven-point half-time lead, with Cork's oldest player Christy Ring proving to be the difference. The game turned on a controversial disallowed goal. At 1-11 to 2-6 in arrears Tipperary engineered a goal for Paddy Kenny. The play was stopped and a free awarded instead. Tipp eventually lost the game by 1-11 to 2-7.

Cork held the upper hand once again when the sides met in 1957, however, Tipperary secured their first defeat of Cork in six years the following year.

For the first time in six years, Cork and Tipperary faced each other in the Munster final in 1960. Described as the toughest game of hurling ever played, Tipp's John and Jimmy Doyle were in the best form of the respective careers. Cork enjoyed most of the possession in the first-half, however, Tipperary led by a goal at the interval thanks to the accuracy of Jimmy Doyle. They stretched their lead to five points in the final quarter, however, a last-minute Cork goal left the result in doubt once again. Tipp eventually won a gruelling contest by 4-13 to 4-11.

1961 marked the end of a decade of frenzied Cork and Tipperary encounters, as the sides did battle in that year's Munster final. An official attendance of 62,175 was the biggest ever recorded at a Cork-Tipperary match, or at any Irish sporting event outside of Croke Park. The real attendance may have been as high as 70,000 as the gates were thrown open halfway through the preceding minor game. Cork's preparations were undermined by the large crowd. After togging off in the Railway Hotel in Limerick city centre, they had intended to travel by cars to the venue. The volume of bodies on the Ennis Road meant that the players had to abandon their cars and physically jostle their way through the crowd to make the throw-in time. At half-time Tipp were out of sight by 3-3 to 0-1. The game ended on a sour note when Christy Ring and John Doyle became involved in a punch-up while Tom Moloughney was knocked to the ground, allegedly after being struck by Ring. Tipperary won the game by 3-6 to 0-7, however, Ring was wrongly named in some national newspapers as having hit both Doyle and Moloughney. The National Union of Journalists later issued an apology to him.

=== 1984–1991: the rivalry reignites ===
One of the highlights of the centenary of the Gaelic Athletic Association was the Munster final between Cork and Tipperary on 15 July 1984. Tipp had failed to win a Munster title since 1971, while Cork had won eight in the intervening period as well as claiming three successive All-Ireland crowns between 1976 and 1978. The game was physical, honest and intense. While the Cork forwards looked dangerous, the Tipperary midfield duo of Ralph Callaghan and Philip Kennedy were on fire. With just six minutes remaining Tipperary looked to have taken a decisive advantage when they held a four-point lead of 3-14 to 2-13. John Fenton converted a free with four minutes remaining and it was at this stage that the decision to introduce the gifted Tony O'Sullivan. When a Pat Hartnett shot was parried by goalkeeper John Sheedy, O'Sullivan reacted instinctively to fire to the net and leave the sides level. As the tension became almost unbearable, Tipperary lost possession from an advantageous attacking position. O'Sullivan's point attempt was batted away by Sheedy and goal-poacher Seánie O'Leary was on hand to net. Fenton added a pointed free and Cork had won an amazing game by 4-15 to 3-14.

"The famine is over."

— Tipperary captain Richard Stakelum as he received the cup after the 1987 Munster Final.

In 1987 Cork were the reigning provincial and All-Ireland champions and had ended any chances of a Tipperary hurling revival in both 1984 and 1985. Because of this Cork were installed as favourites to win a record-breaking six consecutive Munster title, however, Tipperary led by 0-11 to 0-7 at half-time. A second-half goal by Nicky English, which he controlled the sliotar with his foot having dropped his hurley and calmly sidefooted it into the net, put Tipp ahead by seven points. A string of points brought Cork back into the game, and three minutes from time a Kieran Kingston goal gave them a two-point lead. Tipperary rallied and two pointed frees from Pat Fox levelled the game at 1-18 apiece.

In spite of surviving a scare in Thurles, Cork were still regarded as the favourites for the replay. The team scored five unanswered points in the first ten minutes, while a Nicky English goal was cancelled out by a Tomás Mulcahy effort. Cork had a n interval lead of 1-10 to 1-5. Tipperary were inspired after the restart and came back into contention with a succession of points. A Pat Fox point brought the two teams level, however, Cork regained the lead twice but Tipperary levelled twice. At the end of normal time both sides were again level and extra time was needed. The first period of extra-time saw Cork take a 1-21 to 1-20 lead, but Tipp edged forward with two more quick points. Michael Doyle, son of the legendary John Doyle, came on as a substitute and had the game of his life. He scored two extra-time goals to swing the momentum in Tipp's favour. Donie O'Connell bagged another goal to give Tipp an incredible 4-22 to 1-22 victory.

After the highs of 1987, the 1988 installment of the Cork-Tipperary was a damp squib. Tipp led by 1-12 to 0-5 at half-time and eventually bested Cork by 2-19 to 1-13.

In 1990 Tipperary were reigning provincial and All-Ireland champions and were expected to build on this success by retaining their titles. Despite a strong early start which gave them a good lead Tipperary lost their way and Cork won well in the end. Mark Foley played the game of his life, scoring 2-7 from play, and helped Cork to an eight-point dethroning of the All-Ireland champions.

The 1991 Munster final between Cork and Tipperary, ranked among the all-time classics, was seen as a game to decide not only provincial honours but the destination of the All-Ireland title as well. Tipp looked like a defeated team in the early stages and fell 3-5 to 1-7 behind at the break courtesy of three goals shared by John Fitzgibbon and Ger FitzGerald. Young star John Leahy bagged the goal for Tipp, however, Fitzgibbon scored a fourth goal for Cork. The momentum moved towards Tipp after this, however, Nicky English had a perfectly legal equaliser ruled out. Pat Fox levelled the game at 2-16 to 4-10 and a replay was needed.

"If I had ducks they'd drown."

— Nicky English's reaction to a reporter after the drawn
1991 Munster final.

The replay was even more exciting than the draw with Cork taking a nine-point lead at half-time. At the end of the third quarter a Kevin Hennessy goal left the Rebels 3-13 to 1-10 in front. Star forward Nicky English was ruled out of the game through injury, however, the Tipp forwards proved an effective unit without him. Pat Fox produced a great goal to leave just three points between the sides. An overhead flick by Declan Carr subsequently levelled the sides as full-time approached. Tipp then went two points ahead while a Tomás Mulcahy shot on goal was cleared and resulted in Aidan Ryan scoring one of the all-time great Munster final goals for Tipp. John Fitzgibbon answered with a Cork goal, however, the momentum was with Tipperary who won by 4-19 to 4-15. This remains Tipperary's most recent victory over Cork in a Munster senior hurling final. Most recently, Cork defeated Tipperary in the 2000, 2005 and 2006 finals.

== Statistics ==
Up to date as of 2025 season

| Team | All-Ireland | Munster | National League | Total |
|---|---|---|---|---|
| Cork | 30 | 55 | 15 | 100 |
| Tipperary | 29 | 42 | 19 | 90 |
| Combined | 58 | 96 | 33 | 190 |

== All time results ==
=== Senior ===
| Date | Winners | Score | Runners-up | Venue | Stage |
|---|---|---|---|---|---|
| 27 May 1888 | Tipperary | 2-2 - 0-00 | Cork | Buttevant | Munster semi-final |
| 16 July 1888 | Cork | w/o - scr. | Tipperary | Buttevant | Munster semi-final replay |
| 3 March 1895 | Cork | 3-4 - 1-2 | Tipperary | Charleville | Munster final |
| 1 August 1897 | (Draw) Cork | 1-3 - 1-3 | (Draw) Tipperary | FitzGerald Park | Munster final |
| 14 November 1897 | Tipperary | 7-9 - 2-3 | Cork | Jones's Road | Munster final replay |
| 31 July 1898 | Cork | 4-16 - 0-2 | Tipperary | Markets Field | Munster semi-final |
| 15 October 1899 | (Draw) Cork | 2-3 - 3-0 | (Draw) Tipperary | Fraher Field | Munster final |
| 19 November 1899 | Tipperary | 1-13 - 1-2 | Cork | FitzGerald Park | Munster final replay |
| 3 November 1901 | Tipperary | 0-12 - 0-9 | Cork | Tipperary | Munster quarter-final |
| 29 March 1903 | Cork | w/o - scr. | Tipperary | Markets Field | Munster semi-final |
| 10 July 1904 | Cork | 3-5 - 0-2 | Tipperary | Markets Field | Munster quarter-final |
| 17 December 1905 | Cork | 3-10 - 3-4 | Tipperary | Fraher Field | Munster final |
| 28 October 1906 | Cork | 2-4 - 1-3 | Tipperary | FitzGerald Park | Munster semi-final |
| 20 January 1907 | Cork | w/o - scr. | Tipperary | Cork Athletic Grounds | Munster semi-final replay |
| 18 August 1907 | Tipperary | 3-4 - 0-9 | Cork | Tipperary | Munster final |
| 26 April 1908 | Cork | 1-6 - 1-4 | Tipperary | Fraher Field | Munster final |
| 25 October 1908 | Tipperary | 2-11 - 3-7 | Cork | Páirc Mac Gearailt | Munster semi-final |
| 29 August 1909 | Tipperary | 2-10 - 2-6 | Cork | Tipperary | Munster final |
| 3 July 1910 | Cork | 5-7 - 3-4 | Tipperary | Markets Field | Munster semi-final |
| 23 July 1911 | Tipperary | 5-2 - 0-3 | Cork | Fraher Field | Munster semi-final |
| 21 September 1913 | Tipperary | 8-1 - 5-3 | Cork | Fraher Field | Munster final |
| 20 June 1915 | Cork | 4-00 - 3-1 | Tipperary | Fraher Field | Munster semi-final |
| 1 October 1916 | Tipperary | 5-00 - 1-1 | Cork | Fraher Field | Munster final |
| 2 June 1918 | Tipperary | 7-3 - 6-1 | Cork | Thurles Sportsfield | Munster quarter-final |
| 29 June 1919 | Cork | 2-4 - 2-3 | Tipperary | Cork Athletic Grounds | Munster semi-final |
| 20 May 1923 | Tipperary | 6-2 - 3-2 | Cork | Cork Athletic Grounds | Munster semi-final |
| 31 August 1924 | Tipperary | 7-5 - 2-7 | Cork | Fraher Field | Munster semi-final |
| 2 August 1925 | Tipperary | 5-3 - 5-1 | Cork | Markets Field | Munster semi-final |
| 12 September 1926 | Tipperary | 1-2 - 0-00 | Cork | Cork Athletic Grounds | Munster final |
| 19 September 1926 | Cork | 4-1 - 3-4 | Tipperary | Thurles Sportsfield | Munster final refixture |
| 3 October 1926 | Cork | 3-6 - 2-4 | Tipperary | Thurles Sportsfield | Munster final replay |
| 21 July 1929 | Cork | 3-4 - 2-1 | Tipperary | Cork Athletic Grounds | Munster semi-final |
| 26 July 1931 | Cork | 3-5 - 2-3 | Tipperary | Thurles Sportsfield | Munster semi-final |
| 10 June 1934 | Cork | 7-5 - 5-6 | Tipperary | Walsh Park | Munster quarter-final |
| 6 June 1937 | Tipperary | 4-2 - 3-5 | Cork | Thurles Sportsfield | Munster final |
| 2 June 1940 | Cork | 6-3 - 2-6 | Tipperary | Thurles Sportsfield | Munster quarter-final |
| 26 October 1941 | Tipperary | 5-4 - 2-5 | Cork | Gaelic Grounds | Munster final |
| 12 July 1942 | Cork | 4-15 - 4-1 | Tipperary | Thurles Sportsfield | Munster final |
| 25 June 1944 | Cork | 1-9 - 1-3 | Tipperary | Thurles Sportsfield | Munster semi-final |
| 1 July 1945 | Tipperary | 2-13 - 3-2 | Cork | Thurles Sportsfield | Munster semi-final |
| 29 May 1949 | (Draw) Tipperary | 3-10 - 3-10 | (Draw) Cork | Gaelic Grounds | Munster quarter-final |
| 26 June 1949 | Tipperary | 2-11 - 2-9 (AET) | Cork | Gaelic Grounds | Munster quarter-final replay |
| 23 July 1950 | Tipperary | 2-17 - 3-11 | Cork | FitzGerald Stadium | Munster final |
| 29 July 1951 | Tipperary | 2-11 - 2-9 | Cork | Gaelic Grounds | Munster final |
| 13 July 1952 | Cork | 1-11 - 2-6 | Tipperary | Gaelic Grounds | Munster final |
| 26 July 1953 | Cork | 3-10 - 1-11 | Tipperary | Cork Athletic Grounds | Munster final |
| 18 July 1954 | Cork | 2-8 - 1-8 | Tipperary | Gaelic Grounds | Munster final |
| 1 July 1956 | Cork | 1-11 - 2-7 | Tipperary | Gaelic Grounds | Munster semi-final |
| 30 June 1957 | Cork | 5-2 - 1-11 | Tipperary | Gaelic Grounds | Munster semi-final |
| 22 June 1958 | Tipperary | 2-6 - 2-4 | Cork | Gaelic Grounds | Munster semi-final |
| 31 July 1960 | Tipperary | 4-13 - 4-11 | Cork | Thurles Sportsfield | Munster final |
| 30 July 1961 | Tipperary | 3-6 - 0-7 | Cork | Gaelic Grounds | Munster final |
| 30 June 1963 | Tipperary | 4-7 - 1-11 | Cork | Gaelic Grounds | Munster semi-final |
| 26 July 1964 | Tipperary | 3-13 - 1-5 | Cork | Gaelic Grounds | Munster final |
| 25 July 1965 | Tipperary | 4-11 - 0-5 | Cork | Gaelic Grounds | Munster final |
| 21 July 1968 | Tipperary | 2-13 - 1-7 | Cork | Gaelic Grounds | Munster final |
| 27 July 1969 | Cork | 4-6 - 0-9 | Tipperary | Gaelic Grounds | Munster final |
| 19 July 1970 | Cork | 3-10 - 3-8 | Tipperary | Gaelic Grounds | Munster final |
| 25 June 1972 | (Draw) Cork | 3-8 - 3-8 | (Draw) Tipperary | Gaelic Grounds | Munster semi-final |
| 9 July 1972 | Cork | 3-10 - 2-7 | Tipperary | Gaelic Grounds | Munster semi-final replay |
| 1 July 1973 | Tipperary | 5-4 - 1-10 | Cork | Gaelic Grounds | Munster semi-final |
| 13 June 1976 | Cork | 4-10 - 2-15 | Tipperary | Gaelic Grounds | Munster semi-final |
| 3 June 1979 | Cork | 1-14 - 2-10 | Tipperary | Páirc Uí Chaoimh | Munster semi-final |
| 22 June 1980 | Cork | 2-17 - 1-12 | Tipperary | Semple Stadium | Munster semi-final |
| 30 May 1982 | Cork | 1-19 - 2-8 | Tipperary | Páirc Uí Chaoimh | Munster quarter-final |
| 15 July 1984 | Cork | 4-15 - 3-14 | Tipperary | Semple Stadium | Munster final |
| 7 July 1985 | Cork | 4-17 - 4-11 | Tipperary | Páirc Uí Chaoimh | Munster final |
| 12 July 1987 | (Draw) Tipperary | 1-18 -1-18 | (Draw) Cork | Semple Stadium | Munster final |
| 19 July 1987 | Tipperary | 4-22 - 1-22 | Cork | Fitzgerald Stadium | Munster final replay |
| 17 June 1988 | Tipperary | 2-19 - 1-13 | Cork | Gaelic Grounds | Munster final |
| 15 July 1990 | Cork | 4-16 - 2-14 | Tipperary | Semple Stadium | Munster final |
| 8 July 1991 | (Draw) Tipperary | 2-16 - 4-10 | (Draw) Cork | Páirc Uí Chaoimh | Munster final |
| 20 July 1991 | Tipperary | 4-19 - 4-15 | Cork | Semple Stadium | Munster final replay |
| 7 June 1992 | Cork | 2-12 - 1-12 | Tipperary | Páirc Uí Chaoimh | Munster semi-final |
| 2 July 2000 | Cork | 0-23 - 3-12 | Tipperary | Páirc Uí Chaoimh | Munster final |
| 10 July 2004 | Cork | 2-19 - 1-16 | Tipperary | Fitzgerald Stadium | All-Ireland qualifier |
| 26 June 2005 | Cork | 1-21 - 1-16 | Tipperary | Páirc Uí Chaoimh | Munster final |
| 25 June 2006 | Cork | 2-14 - 1-14 | Tipperary | Semple Stadium | Munster final |
| 14 July 2007 | Tipperary | 2-16 - 1-18 | Cork | Semple Stadium | All-Ireland qualifier |
| 8 June 2008 | Tipperary | 1-19 - 1-13 | Cork | Páirc Uí Chaoimh | Munster semi-final |
| 31 May 2009 | Tipperary | 1-19 - 0-19 | Cork | Semple Stadium | Munster quarter final |
| 30 May 2010 | Cork | 3-15 - 0-14 | Tipperary | Páirc Uí Chaoimh | Munster quarter-final |
| 29 May 2011 | Tipperary | 3-22 - 0-23 | Cork | Semple Stadium | Munster quarter-final |
| 24 June 2012 | Tipperary | 1-22 - 0-24 | Cork | Páirc Uí Chaoimh | Munster semi-final |
| 17 August 2014 | Tipperary | 2-18 - 1-11 | Cork | Croke Park | All-Ireland semi-final |
| 22 May 2016 | Tipperary | 0-22 - 0-13 | Cork | Semple Stadium | Munster quarter-final |
| 21 May 2017 | Cork | 2-27 - 1-26 | Tipperary | Semple Stadium | Munster quarter-final |
| 27 May 2018 | (Draw) Tipperary | 2-20 - 1-23 | (Draw) Cork | Semple Stadium | Munster round robin |
| 12 May 2019 | Tipperary | 2-28 - 1-24 | Cork | Páirc Uí Chaoimh | Munster round robin |
| 14 November 2020 | Tipperary | 2-18 - 1-17 | Cork | Gaelic Grounds | All-Ireland Qualifiers |
| 22 May 2022 | Cork | 3-30 - 1-24 | Tipperary | Semple Stadium | Munster round robin |
| 6 May 2023 | (Draw) Cork | 4-19 - 2-25 | (Draw) Tipperary | Páirc Uí Chaoimh | Munster round robin |
| 19 May 2024 | Cork | 4-30 - 1-21 | Tipperary | Semple Stadium | Munster round robin |
| 27 April 2025 | Cork | 4-27 - 0-24 | Tipperary | Páirc Uí Chaoimh | Munster round robin |
| 20 July 2025 | Tipperary | 3-27 - 1-18 | Cork | Croke Park | All-Ireland final |
| 19 April 2026 | Cork | 0-29 - 1-22 | Tipperary | Semple Stadium | Munster round robin |

== Records ==
=== Scorelines ===
- Biggest championship win:
  - For Cork: Cork 4-16 - 0-2 Tipperary, Munster semi-final, Cork, 31 July 1898
  - For Tipperary: Tipperary 7-9 - 2-3 Cork, Munster final replay, Jones's Road, 14 November 1897
- Highest aggregate:
  - Tipperary 4-22 - 1-22 Cork, Munster final replay, FitzGerald Stadium, 19 July 1987
  - Cork 2-27 - 1-26 Tipperary, Munster quarter final, Semple Stadium, 21 May 2017

=== Most appearances ===
| Team | Player | Championship games | Total |
|---|---|---|---|
| Cork | Christy Ring | 1940, 1941, 1942, 1944, 1945, 1949, 1950, 1951, 1952, 1953, 1954, 1956, 1957, 1958, 1960, 1961 | 17 |
| Tipperary | John Doyle | 1949, 1950, 1951, 1952, 1953, 1954, 1956, 1957, 1958, 1960, 1961, 1963, 1964, 1965 | 14 |

=== Top scorers ===
| Team | Player | Score | Total |
|---|---|---|---|
| Cork | Christy Ring | 8-50 | 74 |
| Tipperary | Eoin Kelly | 2-48 | 54 |

=== Attendances ===
- Highest attendance:
  - 82,300 - Tipperary 3-27 - 1-18 Cork, All Ireland Final, Croke Park, 20 July 2025
- Lowest attendance:
  - 12,106 - Tipperary 2-16 - 1-18 Cork, All-Ireland Qualifier, Semple Stadium, 14 July 2007
