= Phippi Kenny =

Irish hurler (1925–1999)

Personal information
- Nickname: Phippi
- Born: 11 February 1925 Borrisoleigh; County Tipperary, Ireland
- Died: 20 March 1999 (aged 74) Nenagh, County Tipperary, Ireland
- Occupation: Hurley maker

Sport
- Sport: Hurling
Clubs
- Years: Club
- Crotta O'Neill's; Faughs; Borris-Ileigh
Club titles
- Tipperary titles: 3
Inter-county
- Years: County
- 1949–1952: Tipperary
Inter-county titles
- Munster titles: 1
- All-Irelands: 1

Philip Kenny (11 February 1925 – 20 March 1999), known as Phippi Kenny, was an Irish hurler. At club level he played with Borris-Ileigh, and also lined out at inter-county level with various Tipperary teams.

== Career ==
Kenny first came to attention as a hurler as a schoolboy at Thurles CBS. A move to Tralee in the early 1940s saw him win a Kerry SHC title with the Crotta O'Neill's club. A further move to Dublin resulted in a Dublin SHC medal with Faughs in 1945. After returning home, Kenny linked up with the Borris-Ileigh club and won the first of six North Tipperary SHC titles in 1947. He also won Tipperary SHC medals in 1949, 1950 and 1953.

Kenny first appeared on the inter-county scene with Tipperary as a member of the minor team in 1941. He later spent a year with the junior team in 1949, before being called up to the senior team later that season. Kenny was an unused substitute when Tipperary beat Kilkenny in the 1950 All-Ireland final.

== Personal life and death ==
Kenny's brothers, Paddy and Seán Kenny, also won All-Ireland SHC medals with Tipperary. His son, also named Philip, won a Munster SHC medal in 1987.

Kenny died in Nenagh on 20 March 1999, at the age of 73.

== Honours ==
Crotta O'Neill's

- Kerry Senior Hurling Championship: 1944

Faughs

- Dublin Senior Hurling Championship: 1945

Borris-Ileigh

- Tipperary Senior Hurling Championship: 1949, 1950, 1953
- North Tipperary Senior Hurling Championship: 1947, 1950, 1951, 1952, 1953, 1955

Tipperary

- All-Ireland Senior Hurling Championship: 1950
- Munster Senior Hurling Championship: 1950
