= Tommy Doyle (Tipperary hurler) =

Irish hurler (1915–1988)

Personal information
- Native name: Tomás Ó Duil (Irish)
- Nickname: The Rubber Man
- Born: 8 February 1915 Thurles, County Tipperary, Ireland
- Died: 5 February 1988 (aged 72) Thurles, County Tipperary, Ireland
- Height: 5 ft 9 in (175 cm)

Sport
- Sport: Hurling
- Position: Left wing-back
Clubs
- Years: Club
- Thurles Kickhams; Thurles Sarsfields
Club titles
- Tipperary titles: 7
Inter-county
- Years: County
- 1936–1953: Tipperary
Inter-county titles
- Munster titles: 6
- All-Irelands: 5
- NHL: 2

Thomas Doyle (8 February 1915 – 5 February 1988) was an Irish hurler who played as a left wing-back for the Tipperary senior team.

Born in Thurles, County Tipperary, Doyle first arrived on the inter-county scene at the age of seventeen when he first linked up with the Tipperary minor team, before later joining the junior side. He made his senior debut in the 1936–37 National League. Doyle went on to enjoy a seventeen-year inter-county career, and won five All-Ireland medals, six Munster medals and two National Hurling League medals.

Doyle represented the Munster inter-provincial team at various times, winning three Railway Cup medals on the field of play. At club level he won seven championship medals with Thurles Sarsfields.

His retirement came following the conclusion of the 1953 championship.

Doyle's brother, Gerry, also played with Tipperary, while his nephew, Jimmy, was a six-time All-Ireland medallist with Tipperary.

Doyle was the seventh recipient of the All-Time All-Star Award, and has been repeatedly voted onto teams made up of the sport's greats, including at left wing-back on the Tipperary Hurling Team of the Century in 2000.

== Playing career ==
=== Club ===
Doyle first came to hurling prominence winning back-to-back minor championships with Thurles Kickhams in 1932 and 1933.

He won a mid-Tipperary junior championship medal with the club in 1934, before later switching allegiance and joining the Thurles Sarsfields club in 1938. His decision was a wise one, as he won a championship medal in his debut season following a 7–7 to 2–2 county final defeat of Kildangan. Sarsfields retained their championship crown in 1939 following a 5–3 to 4–2 defeat of a dogged Cashel King Cormacs.

After a three-year wait the club were county champions again in 1942, with Doye winning a third championship medal after destroying Killenaule by 8–5 to 0–1 in the decider.

In 1944 Thurles Sarsfields faced Kilruane McDonagh's in a particularly bad-tempered final. Kilruane finished the game with ten players after a goalmouth melee ensued involving players and spectators. The game was held up while the pitch was cleared and then awarded to Sarsfields by the referee when Kilruane couldn't field a full team. Roscrea were defeated in 1945 in less controversial circumstances after a replay, and Carrick Swans were thumped 4–5 to 0–3 in the 1946 final. It was the club's first three-in-a-row in nearly forty years, with Doyle bringing his championship medal tally to six.

Doyle was appointed captain of the team in 1952, as Thurles Sarsfields reached the championship decider after a six-year gap. A 5–6 to 1–8 defeat of Borris-Ileigh gave him a seventh and final championship medal.

=== Inter-county ===
==== Minor ====
Doyle first came to prominence on the inter-county scene as a member of the Tipperary minor team in 1933. A 3–1 to 2–2 defeat of arch rivals Cork gave him a Munster medal in his debut championship. Tipp later faced Galway in the All-Ireland decider. A 4–6 to 2–3 double scores victory gave Doyle an All-Ireland Minor Hurling Championship medal.

==== Senior success ====
After spending an unsuccessful year with the Tipperary junior team, Doyle was called up to the senior panel during the 1936–37 National Hurling League. He made his senior championship debut on 6 June 1937 in a 4–3 to 3–5 Munster semi-final defeat of Cork. Doyle subsequently collected his first Munster medal in the senior grade following a 6–3 to 4–3 defeat of Limerick. The All-Ireland final against Kilkenny took place at Fitzgerald Stadium, Killarney on 5 September 1937. Tipperary gave a tour de force performance and recorded a 3–11 to 0–3 victory in one of the most one-sided championship deciders ever. Doyle had won his first senior All-Ireland medal.

Tipperary hurling faced a traumatic few years following this victory. The county was excluded from the provincial championship in 1941 due to an outbreak of foot and mouth disease. As a result of this Cork were declared Munster champions and went on to win the All-Ireland title. In the delayed Munster final Tipperary gained their revenge on Cork and Doyle collected a second Munster medal.

In 1945 Tipperary halted Cork's bid for a fifth successive All-Ireland title, before later securing the Munster crown following a 4–3 to 2–6 defeat of Limerick. It was Doyle's third Munster medal. The All-Ireland final on 2 September 1945 saw Tipperary face Kilkenny once again. Tipp led by 4–3 to 0–3 at half-time, however, immediately after the interval Kilkenny strung three goals together before forcing two great saves from goalkeeper Jimmy Maher. At full-time Tipperary were the champions and Doyle collected a second All-Ireland medal.

==== Three-in-a-row ====
Tipperary went into decline following this victory and Doyle decided to retire from inter-county hurling. On his way home from posting a letter to the county board announcing his retirement Doyle bumped into selector John Joe Callanan. Callanan told Doyle that the regular corner-back was ill, and asked Doyle if he would take his place and mark the great Christy Ring. Doyle agreed and he produced perhaps the greatest display of marking in the history of the game, holding the legendary Ring scoreless through 150 minutes of championship hurling. Tipperary later defeated Limerick by 1–16 to 2–10 to take the provincial title. It was Doyle's fourth Munster medal. On 4 September 1949 Tipperary and Laois faced off in the All-Ireland decider. In a one-sided affair Tipp completely overpowered the Leinster champions on a score line of 3–11 to 0–3, giving Doyle his third All-Ireland medal.

Tipperary retained their provincial crown in 1950. A hard-fought 2–17 to 3–11 defeat of Cork in a tense game gave Doyle his fifth Munster medal. He later lined out in his second successive All-Ireland final on 3 September 1950, with age-old rivals Kilkenny providing the opposition. In a dull affair, Tipp looked to be heading for victory when Seán Kenny scored a goal to put the team four points ahead with just one minute left to play. Kilkenny fought back and a Jimmy Kelly goal from the puck-out reduced the deficit to just one point again. As "the Cats" were about to launch one final attack, the referee blew the whistle and Tipperary had won by 1–9 to 1–8. Doyle collected a fourth All-Ireland medal. He rounded off the year by winning a National League medal following a 1–12 to 3–4 defeat of New York.

Tipperary's dominance of the provincial championship continued in 1951, with Doyle lining out against Cork in a third successive Munster decider. Cork's Christy Ring gave one of his best displays, however, the Tipperary full-back line of John Doyle, Tony Brennan and Mickey "the Rattler" Byrne also gave a defiant performance. A 2–11 to 2–9 victory gave Doyle a sixth Munster medal. The subsequent All-Ireland decider against Wexford on 2 September 1951 provided Tipperary with the chance to secure a hat-trick of championship titles for the first time in over half a century. Nicky Rackard, Wexford's goal-scoring machine, was nullified by Tipp goalkeeper Tony Reddin, while Séamus Bannon, Tim Ryan and Paddy Kenny scored key goals which powered Tipp to a 7–7 to 3–9 victory. It was Doyle's fifth All-Ireland medal.

==== Retirement ====
Doyle won a second National League medal in 1952, as New York were bested on a 6–14 to 2–5 score line. The dream of a fourth successive All-Ireland triumph came to an end when Cork defeated Tipperary in the provincial decider.

His final championship campaign in 1953 saw Doyle being named captain of the team. He played his last game on 26 July 1953 in a 3–10 to 1–11 Munster final defeat by Cork.

=== Inter-provincial ===
Doyle also won Railway Cup medals with Munster in 1942, 1943, 1944, 1945, 1946, 1948 and 1950.

== Honours ==
=== Team ===
Thurles Kickhams

- Tipperary Minor Hurling Championship (2): 1932, 1933
- Mid Tipperary Junior Hurling Championship (1): 1934

Thurles Sarsfields

- Tipperary Senior Hurling Championship (7): 1938, 1939, 1942, 1944, 1945, 1946, 1952 (c)
- Mid Tipperary Senior Hurling Championship (8): 1938, 1939, 1942, 1944, 1945, 1946, 1950, 1952 (c)

Tipperary

- All-Ireland Senior Hurling Championship (5): 1937, 1945, 1949, 1950, 1951
- Munster Senior Hurling Championship (6): 1937, 1941, 1945, 1949, 1950, 1951
- National Hurling League (2): 1949–50, 1951–52
- Oireachtas Cup (1): 1949
- All-Ireland Minor Hurling Championship (1): 1933
- Munster Minor Hurling Championship (1): 1933

Munster

- Railway Cup (7): 1942, 1943, 1944, 1945, 1946, 1948, 1950

=== Individual ===
Honours

- Tipperary Hurling Team of the Century: Left wing-back

Sporting positions
Preceded by Pat Stakelum	Tipperary Senior Hurling Captain; 1953	Succeeded by Jimmy Finn
Awards
Preceded by Eudie Coughlan (Cork)	All-Time All-Star Award; 1986	Succeeded by Christy Moylan (Waterford)
