= 1952 All-Ireland Senior Hurling Championship =

Championship details
- Dates: 27 April – 7 September 1952
- Teams: 13

All-Ireland champions
- Winning team: Cork (17th win)
- Captain: Paddy Barry

All-Ireland Finalists
- Losing team: Dublin
- Captain: Jim Prior

Provincial champions
- Munster: Cork
- Leinster: Dublin
- Ulster: Not Played
- Connacht: Not Played

Championship statistics
- No. matches played: 13
- Goals total: 83 (6.3 per game)
- Points total: 166 (12.7 per game)
- Top Scorer: Christy Ring (1–15); Liam Dowling (5–3)
- All-Star Team: See here

The 1952 All-Ireland Senior Hurling Championship was the 66th staging of the All-Ireland hurling championship since its establishment by the Gaelic Athletic Association in 1887. The championship began on 27 April 1952 and ended on 7 September 1952.

Tipperary were the defending champions and were on course for a record-equalling fourth successive All-Ireland, however, they were defeated in the provincial championship. Cork won the title following a 2–14 to 0–7 defeat of Dublin in the final.

== Teams ==
=== Team summaries ===
Team	Colours	Most recent success		
Team	Colours	All-Ireland	Provincial	League
Clare	Saffron and blue	1914	1932	1945–46
Cork	Red and white	1946	1947	1947–48
Dublin	Navy and blue	1938	1948	1938–39
Galway	Maroon and white	1923	1922	1950–51
Kilkenny	Black and amber	1947	1950	1932–33
Laois	Blue and white	1915	1949	
Limerick	Green and white	1940	1940	1946–47
Meath	Green and gold			
Offaly	Green, white and gold			
Tipperary	Blue and gold	1951	1951	1951–52
Waterford	Blue and white	1948	1948	
Westmeath	Maroon and white			
Wexford	Purple and gold	1910	1918	

== Provincial championships ==
=== Leinster Senior Hurling Championship ===
First round

27 April 1952 First round	Westmeath	3–07 – 4–06	Laois	O'Connor Park, Tullamore
	J McGrath 1–2, J Daly 1–1, E Lenihan 1–0, E Daly 0–2, J Aylward 0–1, P Bolger 0–1.		Lalor 3–2, Kelly 1–0, H Gray 0–3, Maher 0–1.	Referee: P Connell (Offaly)

4 May 1952 First round	Meath	2–01 – 6–08	Dublin	St. Loman's Park, Trim
	M Linehan 1–1, M Kane 1–0.		J Prior 2–2, J Finnan 2–0, T Herbert 1–2, M Williams 1–0, M Wilson 0–3, G Kelly 0–1.	Referee: J Phelan

4 May 1952 First round	Offaly	2–08 – 3–08	Kilkenny	St. Brendan's Park, Birr
	P Bermingham 1–2, D Gorgan 1–0, Mitchell 0–3, W Nevin 0–2, T Errity 0–1.		J Langton 1–3, S Clohessy 1–1, O'Neill 1–0, S Downey 0–2, J Sutton 0–1, P Long 0–1.	Referee: J Conroy

Semi-finals

8 June 1952 Semi-final	Wexford	4–07 – 5–01	Kilkenny	Croke Park, Dublin
	J Cummins 3–0, T Russell 1–1, T Flood 0–3, D Ahearne 0–1, Padge Kehoe 0–2.		J Cashin 2–0, W Walsh 1–1, PJ Garvan 1–0, S Downey 1–0.	Attendance: 26,100; Referee: P Connell (Offaly)

15 June 1952 Semi-final	Dublin	5–10 – 3–06	Laois	Nowlan Park, Kilkenny
	T Herbert 2–1, J Maher 2–1, J Finnan 1–2, G Kelly 0–2, E Kelly 0–2, M Wilson 0–1, N Allen 0–1.		H Gray 1–1, J Styles 1–0, P Lalor 1–0, W Dargan 0–3, B Bohane 0–2.	Referee: P Connell (Offaly)

Final

6 July 1952 Final	Wexford	3–06 – 7–02	Dublin	Nowlan Park, Kilkenny
	N Rackard 2–4, N Wheeler 0–1, T Flood 1–1,		T Kelly 3–1, A O'Brien 2–0, T Herbert 1–0, J Finnan 1–0, C Murphy 0–1.	Attendance: 30,000; Referee: P Connell (Offaly)

=== Munster Senior Hurling Championship ===
First round

1 June 1952 First round	Waterford	3–04 – 3–04	Clare	Walsh Park, Waterford
	McHugh 2–0, Queally 1–0, J Fives 0–1, M Flannelly 0–1, J O'Connor 0–1, M Fives 0–1.		N Jordan 2–0, Carroll 1–0, J Smyth 0–3, Nugent 0–1.	Referee: C Murphy (Cork)

8 June 1952 First round replay	Waterford	3–07 – 2–04	Clare	Thurles Sportsfield
	J Fives 1–2, Carew 1–1, McHugh 1–0, P Grimes 0–1, M O'Connor 0–1, M Fives 0–1, Healy 0–1.		McAllister 1–1, N Jordan 1–0, Daly 0–1, Leahy 0–1, J Smyth 0–1.	Attendance: 7,347; Referee: T Semple (Tipperary)

Semi-finals

22 June 1952 Semi-final	Cork	6–06 – 2–04	Limerick	Thurles Sportsfield, Thurles
	J Hartnett 2–2, L Dowling 2–0, C Ring 1–1, T Furlong 1–0, P Barry 0–1, M Fouhy 0–1, J Twomey 0–1,		D Kelly 1–0, W Dooley 1–0, R Leonard 0–1, D Stokes 0–1, EJ Fitzgibbon 0–1, T Long 0–1.	Attendance: 14,720; Referee: S Vaughan (Waterford)

29 June 1952 Semi-final	Tipperary	8–10 – 3–08	Waterford	Gaelic Grounds, Limerick
	S Bannon 2–2, P Kenny 2–1, S Maher 2–0, M Ryan 1–1, J Ryan 1–1, N Ryan 0–2, Stakelum 0–2.		P Grimes 2–0, M Healy 1–2, J Fives 0–3, M Fives 0–2, W Mulcahy 0–1.	Attendance: 16,604; Referee: C Murphy (Cork)

Final

13 July 1952 Final	Cork	1–11 – 2–06	Tipperary	Gaelic Grounds, Limerick
	L Dowling 1–3, C Ring 0–5, P Barry 0–1, G Murphy 0–1, S O'Brien 0–1.		P Kenny 1–2, S Bannon 1–0, P Stakelum 0–2, M Ryan 0–1, G Doyle 0–1.	Attendance: 43,236; Referee: S Vaughan (Waterford)

== All-Ireland Senior Hurling Championship ==
Semi-final

27 July 1952 Semi-final	Cork	1–05 – 0–06	Galway	Gaelic Grounds, Limerick
	J Hartnett 1–0, C Ring 0–3, J Towmey 0–1, G Murphy 0–1,		J Sammon 0–2, J Killeen 0–2, H Gordon 0–1, P Nolan 0–1.	Attendance: 25,000; Referee: M Hogan (Tipperary)

Final

7 September 1952 Final	Cork	2–14 – 0–07	Dublin	Croke Park, Dublin
	L Dowling 2–0, C Ring 0–6, P Barry 0–3, J Twomey 0–2, WJ Daly 0–2, W Griffin 0–1.		C Murphy 0–2, G Kelly 0–2, N Allen 0–2, R McCarthy 0–1.	Attendance: 64,332; Referee: W O'Donoghue (Limerick)

== Championship statistics ==
=== Top scorers ===
Top scorers overall

Rank	Player	Club	Tally	Total	Matches	Average
1	Liam Dowling	Cork	5-03	18	4	4.50
1	Christy Ring	Cork	1–15	18	4	4.50
2	Tony Herbert	Dublin	4-03	15	4	3.75
3	Paddy Lalor	Laois	4-02	14	2	7.00
3	Jack Finnan	Dublin	4-02	14	4	3.50
4	Paddy Kenny	Tipperary	3-03	12	2	6.00
5	Séamus Bannon	Tipperary	3-02	11	2	5.50
5	Josie Hartnett	Cork	3-02	11	4	2.75
6	Ted Kelly	Dublin	3-01	10	1	10.00
6	Nicky Rackard	Wexford	2-04	10	1	10.00

Top scorers in a single game

Rank	Player	Club	Tally	Total	Opposition
1	Paddy Lalor	Laois	3-02	11	Westmeath
2	Ted Kelly	Dublin	3-01	10	Wexford
2	Nicky Rackard	Wexford	2-04	10	Dublin
3	John Cummins	Wexford	3-00	9	Kilkenny
4	Jim Prior	Dublin	2-02	8	Meath
4	Josie Hartnett	Cork	2-02	8	Limerick
4	Séamus Bannon	Tipperary	2-02	8	Cork
5	Tony Herbert	Dublin	2-01	7	Laois
5	J. Maher	Dublin	2-01	7	Laois
5	Paddy Kenny	Tipperary	2-01	7	Waterford

=== Scoring ===
- Widest winning margin: 17 points
  - Tipperary 8–10 – 3–8 Waterford (Munster semi-final, 29 June 1952)
- Most goals in a match: 11
  - Tipperary 8–10 – 3–8 Waterford (Munster semi-final, 29 June 1952)
- Most points in a match: 21
  - Cork 2–14 – 0–7 Dublin (All-Ireland final, 7 September 1952)
- Most goals by one team in a match: 8
  - Tipperary 8–10 – 3–8 Waterford (Munster semi-final, 29 June 1952)
- Most goals scored by a losing team: 5
  - Kilkenny 5–1 – 4–7 Wexford (Leinster semi-final, 8 June 1952)
- Most points scored by a losing team: 10
  - Offaly 2–8 – 3–8 Kilkenny (Leinster quarter-final, 4 May 1952)
  - Waterford 3–8 – 8–10 Tipperary (Munster semi-final, 29 June 1952)

=== Miscellaneous ===
- Tipperary's 8–10 to 3–8 Munster semi-final defeat of Waterford was their 16th consecutive championship game without defeat. This 16-game unbeaten streak, which included 15 wins and one draw, was a record which stood until 9 August 2009 when Kilkenny recorded their 17th successive championship victory.

== Sources ==
- Corry, Eoghan, The GAA Book of Lists (Hodder Headline Ireland, 2005).
- Donegan, Des, The Complete Handbook of Gaelic Games (DBA Publications Limited, 2005).
- Horgan, Tim, Christy Ring: Hurling's Greatest (The Collins Press, 2007).
- Nolan, Pat, Flashbacks: A Half Century of Cork Hurling (The Collins Press, 2000).
- Sweeney, Éamonn, Munster Hurling Legends (The O'Brien Press, 2002).
