= Seán Kenny (hurler) =

Irish hurler

Personal information
- Native name: Seán Ó Cionnaith (Irish)
- Nickname: The Iron Man from Borrisoleigh
- Born: 29 December 1923 Borrisoleigh, County Tipperary, Ireland
- Died: 24 April 2002 (aged 78) Borrisoleigh, County Tipperary, Ireland
- Height: 5 ft 9 in (175 cm)

Sport
- Sport: Hurling
- Position: Midfield
Clubs
- Years: Club
- Borrisoleigh; Borris–Ileigh; Young Irelands
Club titles
- Tipperary titles: 3
Inter-county
- Years: County
- 1947-1951: Tipperary
Inter-county titles
- Munster titles: 3
- All-Irelands: 3
- NHL: 3

John Kenny (29 December 1923 – 24 April 2002), known as Seán Kenny, was an Irish hurler. At club level, he spent most of his career with Borris–Ileigh and at inter-county level was a member of the Tipperary senior hurling team. Kenny captained Tipperary to the All-Ireland SHC title in 1950.

== Early life ==
Kenny was born and raised in Borrisoleigh, County Tipperary. His uncle, Patrick Harty, captained Tipperary to the All-Ireland JHC title in 1930. Kenny played hurling at all levels during his time as a student at Thurles CBS and had the distinction of winning both the Dean Ryan Cup and Dr Harty Cup titles in 1939.

== Club career ==
Kenny first played club hurling with Borrisoleigh, before later lining out with the newly-formed Borris–Ileigh club. He won four North Tipperary SHC medals and one Mid Tipperary SHC medal between 1947 and 1953. After being runners-up to Carrick Swans in 1947, Kenny claimed his first Tipperary SHC medal in 1949, following a 4–06 to 2–01 win over Kickhams. He captained the team to retaining the title the following year, when Carrick Swans were beaten by four points in the final. Ryan played with the Young Irelands club in Dublin in 1952, but returned to Borris–Ileigh and claimed a third and final Tipperary SHC title in 1953.

== Inter-county career ==
Kenny first appeared on the inter-county scene with Tipperary as captain of the minor team beaten by Cork in the 1941 Munster MHC final. Subsequent performances at club level resulted in his addition to the senior team and he was part of the Tipperary side that won the 1946–47 National Hurling League title. Two years later, Kenny claimed a second National League medal, as well as his first Munster SHC medal after a 1–16 to 2–10 win over Limerick. He was at midfield when Tipperary later beat Laois by 3–11 to 0–03 in the 1949 All-Ireland SHC final.

Kenny was appointed team captain for 1950, and won a second consecutive Munster SHC medal, following a 2–17 to 3–11 win over Cork. He later claimed a second consecutive All-Ireland SHC medal, as well as having the honour of accepting the Liam MacCarthy Cup, when he captained Tipperary to a one-point win over Kilkenny in the 1950 All-Ireland SHC final.

Kenny retained the captaincy for 1951, however, he was injured in the Munster first round game against Waterford. Jimmy Finn assumed the captaincy, as Kenny missed much of the rest of the season because of his cartilage issue. In spie of this, he claimed a third successive Munster SHC medal as a panel member. Kenny later won a third successive All-Ireland SHC medal, after coming on as a substitute for his brother Paddy in the 7–07 to 3–09 win over Wexford in the 1951 All-Ireland SHC final. He never fully recovered from the knee injury and was forced to retire from hurling shortly afterwards, having won a third National League title in 1953.

== Inter-provincial career ==
Kenny's performances with Tipperary resulted in his selection for the Munster inter-provincial team. He won his first Railway Cup medal in 1950, following Munster's 0–09 to 1–03 win over Leinster in the final. Kenny was appointed team captain the following year, and claimed a second successive Railway Cup medal as Leinster were once again beaten.

== Death ==
Kenny died on 24 April 2002, at the age of 78.

== Honours ==
Thurles CBS

- Dr Harty Cup: 1939
- Dean Ryan Cup: 1939

Borris–Ileigh

- Tipperary Senior Hurling Championship: 1949, 1950 (c), 1953
- North Tipperary Senior Hurling Championship: 1947, 1950, 1951, 1953
- Mid Tipperary Senior Hurling Championship: 1949

Tipperary

- All-Ireland Senior Hurling Championship: 1949, 1950 (c), 1951
- Munster Senior Hurling Championship: 1949, 1950 (c), 1951
- National Hurling League: 1946–47, 1948–49, 1952–53

Munster

- Railway Cup: 1950, 1951

Sporting positions
Preceded by	Tipperary minor hurling team captain 1941	Succeeded by
Preceded by Pat Stakelum	Tipperary senior hurling team captain 1950-1951	Succeeded by Jimmy Finn
Preceded by Pat Stakelum	Munster captain 1951	Succeeded by Pat Stakelum
Achievements
Preceded by Pat Stakelum	All-Ireland SHC final winning captain 1950	Succeeded by Jimmy Finn
Preceded by Pat Stakelum	Railway Cup final winning captain 1951	Succeeded by Pat Stakelum
