= Tim Ryan (hurler) =

Irish hurler

Personal information
- Native name: Tadhg Ó Riain (Irish)
- Born: 1923 Borrisoleigh, County Tipperary, Ireland
- Died: 26 February 1996 (aged 72) Borrisoleigh, County Tipperary, Ireland
- Occupation: Creamery manager
- Height: 5 ft 8 in (173 cm)

Sport
- Sport: Hurling
- Position: Left wing-forward
Club
- Years: Club
- Borris–Ileigh
Club titles
- Tipperary titles: 3
Inter-county
- Years: County
- 1950-1953: Tipperary
Inter-county titles
- Munster titles: 1
- All-Irelands: 1
- NHL: 1

Timothy Ryan (1923 – 26 February 1996) was an Irish hurler. At club level he played with Borris–Ileigh and was also a member of the Tipperary senior hurling team.

== Career ==
Ryan first played hurling at club level with Borris–Ileigh. He progressed onto the club's senior team and won a Mid Tipperary SHC title in 1949, before later being a part of the club's first team to win the Tipperary SHC title. After the club switched divisions, Ryan won five North Tipperary SHC titles and two more Tipperary SHC titles, including one as team captain in 1953.

Ryan first played for Tipperary as a member of the minor team in 1941. He joined the senior team in 1950 and, after winning a Munster SHC medal, lined out at wing-forward when Tipperary beat Wexford in the 1951 All-Ireland final. Ryan also won a National League title during his brief inter-county career.

== Personal life and death ==
His brother, Ned Ryan and future brother-in-law, Pat Stakelum, were all part of Tipperary's three-in-a-row team from 1949 to 1951. His sons, Bobby and Aidan, were part of the Tipperary team that won All-Ireland titles in 1989 and 1991, while another son, Pat Ryan, also lined out for Tipperary.

Ryan died after a period of ill health on 26 February 1996, at the age of 72.

== Honours ==
Borris–Ileigh

- Tipperary Senior Hurling Championship: 1949, 1950, 1953 (c)
- Mid Tipperary Senior Hurling Championship: 1949
- North Tipperary Senior Hurling Championship: 1950, 1951, 1952, 1953 (c), 1955

Tipperary

- All-Ireland Senior Hurling Championship: 1951
- Munster Senior Hurling Championship: 1951
- National Hurling League: 1951–52
