= Jimmy Finn =

Irish hurler

Personal information
- Native name: Séamus Ó Finn (Irish)
- Nickname: Jamie
- Born: 16 November 1931 (age 94) Borrisoleigh, County Tipperary, Ireland
- Occupation: Farmer
- Height: 5 ft 11 in (180 cm)

Sport
- Sport: Hurling
- Position: Right wing-back
Club
- Years: Club
- Borris–Ileigh
Club titles
- Tipperary titles: 3
Inter-county*
Years	County	Apps (scores)
1949–1960	Tipperary	20 (0-00)
Inter-county titles
- Munster titles: 3
- All-Irelands: 3
- NHL: 6
- *Inter County team apps and scores correct as of 17:12, 1 November 2014.

James Finn (born 16 November 1931) is an Irish retired hurler who played as a right wing-back for the Tipperary senior team.

Born in Borrisoleigh, County Tipperary, Finn first played competitive hurling during his schooling at Thurles CBS. He arrived on the inter-county scene at the age of seventeen when he first linked up with the Tipperary minor team. He made his senior debut during the 1950-49 National Hurling League. Finn was a regular member of the starting fifteen for the next decade, and won three All-Ireland medals, three Munster medals and six National League medals. Finn captained the team to the All-Ireland title in 1951.

As a member of the Munster inter-provincial team on a number of occasions, Finn won two Railway Cup medals. At club level he is a three-time championship medallist with Borris–Ileigh.

His retirement came following the conclusion of the 1960 championship.

Finn is widely regarded as one of the greatest hurlers in the history of the game. He has been repeatedly voted onto teams made up of the sport's greats, including at right wing-back on the Hurling Team of the Century in 1984.

== Playing career ==
=== Club ===
Finn was barely out of the minor ranks when he first lined out for the Borris–Ileigh senior team. He won his first county championship in 1949 following an emphatic victory in the final.

Borris–Ileigh were back in the county decider again in 1950, with Finn winning a second consecutive championship medal after a defeat of Carrick Swans.

Finn won a third and final championship medal in 1953 following a 4–8 to 4–4 defeat of Boherlahan.

=== Inter-county ===
==== Minor ====
After enjoying little success with the Tipperary minor team in his debut season, Finn was eligible for the grade again in 1949. A narrow 5–6 to 5–5 defeat of Clare in the provincial decider gave him his sole Munster medal. The subsequent All-Ireland decider pitted Tipperary against Kilkenny. Tipperary had a greater goal-threat amongst their forwards and powered to a comfortable 6–5 to 2–4 victory, giving Finn an All-Ireland Minor Hurling Championship medal.

==== Beginnings ====
Finn was still a member of the Tipperary minor team when he made his senior debut in the National League of 1949/50. Tipperary had won the Munster Senior Title in 1949. However, he was not a member of that side.

Tipperary retained their provincial crown in 1950, however, Finn missed the game. He was restored to the starting fifteen for the All-Ireland final on 3 September 1950, with age-old rivals Kilkenny providing the opposition. In a dull affair, Tipp looked to be heading for victory when Paddy Kenny scored a goal to put the team four points ahead with just one minute left to play. Kilkenny fought back and a Jimmy Kelly goal from the puck-out reduced the deficit to just one point again. As "the Cats" were about to launch one final attack, the referee blew the whistle and Tipperary had won by 1–9 to 1–8. It was a first All-Ireland medal for Finn. He rounded off the year by winning a first National Hurling League medal following a 1–12 to 3–4 defeat of New York.

In 1951 Finn was just nineteen-years-old when he was appointed captain of the Tipperary senior team. The team's dominance of the provincial championship continued, with Finn lining out against Cork in the Munster decider. Cork's Christy Ring gave one of his best displays, however, the Tipperary full-back line of John Doyle, Tony Brennan and Mickey "the Rattler" Byrne also gave a defiant performance. A 2–11 to 2–9 victory gave Finn a second Munster medal. The subsequent All-Ireland decider against Wexford on 2 September 1951 provided Tipperary with the chance to secure a hat-trick of championship titles for the first time in over half a century. Nicky Rackard, Wexford's goal-scoring machine, was nullified by Tipp goalkeeper Tony Reddin, while Séamus Bannon, Tim Ryan and Paddy Kenny scored key goals which powered Tipp to a 7–7 to 3–9 victory. It was Finn's second All-Ireland medal, while he also had the honour of lifting the Liam MacCarthy Cup as captain.

==== Fallow period ====
Finn won a second National League medal in 1952, as New York were bested on a 6–14 to 2–5 score line. The dream of a fourth successive All-Ireland triumph came to an end when Cork defeated Tipperary in the provincial decider.

Tipperary went into a period of decline following this, as Cork and Wexford had a stranglehold on the All-Ireland crown. In spite of this, Finn added three more National League medals to his collection following defeats of Kilkenny in 1954 as captain, Wexford in 1955 and Kilkenny again in 1957.

==== A third All-Ireland ====
In 1958 Finn won a third Munster medal as Tipperary regained the provincial crown following a 4–12 to 1–5 trouncing of reigning champions Waterford. Tipp later defeated Kilkenny in the All-Ireland semi-final before lining out against Galway in the All-Ireland decider on 7 September 1958. Galway got a bye into the final without picking up a hurley. Liam Devaney, Donie Nealon and Larry Keane all scored goals for Tipperary in the first-half, while Tony Wall sent a seventy-yard free untouched to the Galway net. Tipp won the game by 4–9 to 2–5 giving Finn his third and final All-Ireland medal.

Finn won a sixth National League medal in 1959 following a 0–15 to 0–7 defeat of Waterford, however, Tipperary subsequently surrendered their provincial and All-Ireland crowns.

== Honours ==
=== Team ===
Thurles CBS

- Dean Ryan Cup: 1947

Borris–Ileigh

- Tipperary Senior Hurling Championship (3): 1949, 1950, 1953

Tipperary

- All-Ireland Senior Hurling Championship (3): 1950, 1951 (c), 1958
- Munster Senior Hurling Championship (3): 1950, 1951, 1958
- National Hurling League (6): 1949–50, 1951–52, 1953–54 (c), 1954–55, 1956–57, 1958–59
- All-Ireland Minor Hurling Championship (1): 1949
- Munster Minor Hurling Championship (1): 1949

Munster

- Railway Cup (6): 1952 (sub), 1955 (sub), 1957, 1958

=== Individual ===
Honours

- Hurling Team of the Century: Right wing-back
- Tipperary Hurling Team of the Century: Right wing-back
- GPA Lifetime Achievement Award for contribution to hurling: Presented on 19 September 2015 at the annual Former Players' Event in Croke Park.
- Inducted into the Hall of Fame by the Tipperary Association in Dublin, as part of the Tipperary Person of the Year Awards, 2019

Sporting positions
Preceded by Seán Kenny	Tipperary Senior Hurling Captain; 1951	Succeeded by Pat Stakelum
Preceded by Tommy Doyle	Tipperary Senior Hurling Captain; 1954	Succeeded by John Doyle
Achievements
Preceded by Seán Kenny	All-Ireland Senior Hurling Final winning captain 1951	Succeeded by Paddy Barry
