= Pat Ryan (Borris–Ileigh hurler) =

Irish hurler (born 1958)

Personal information
- Native name: Pádraig Ó Riain (Irish)
- Nickname: Flowery
- Born: 1958 (age 67–68) Borrisoleigh, County Tipperary, Ireland
- Occupations: Colliers head of hotels and leisure
- Height: 5 ft 11 in (180 cm)

Sport
- Sport: Hurling
- Position: Midfield
Club
- Years: Club
- Borris–Ileigh
Club titles
- Tipperary titles: 1
- All-Ireland Titles: 1
Inter-county
Years	County	Apps (scores)
1976–1982	Tipperary	5 (0-00)
Inter-county titles
- Munster titles: 0
- All-Irelands: 0
- NHL: 1
- All Stars: 0

Patrick Ryan (born 1958) is an Irish former hurler. At club level he played with Borris–Ileigh and was also a member of the Tipperary senior hurling team.

== Career ==
Ryan played hurling as a schoolboy at Templemore CBS where he won consecutive Corn Phádraig titles and a Dr. Kinnane Cup in 1974 and 1975. He first played for Borris–Ileigh at juvenile and underage levels before eventually joining the club's senior team. Ryan won two North Tipperary SHC titles and a Tipperary SHC title in 1981. His accountancy studies and subsequent career abroad brought a premature end to his hurling, however, he rejoined the Borris–Ileigh team and trained with them in advance of their defeat of Rathnure in the 1987 All-Ireland club final.

Ryan first played for Tipperary during a two-year tenure at minor level. He was at midfield when the Tipperary minors beat Kilkenny in the 1976 All-Ireland minor final. Ryan subsequently spent three years with the under-21 team and won consecutive All-Ireland U21HC medals in 1978 and 1979. He was drafted onto the senior team in 1976. Ryan won a National League title in 1979 before leaving the panel in 1982.

== Family ==
His father, Tim Ryan, and his uncles, Ned Ryan and Pat Stakelum, won All-Ireland medals with Tipperary between 1949 and 1951. His brothers, Bobby and Aidan, were part of the Tipperary team that won All-Ireland titles in 1989 and 1991.

== Honours ==
Templemore CBS

- Dr. Kinnane Cup: 1975
- Corn Phádraig: 1974, 1975

Borris–Ileigh

- All-Ireland Senior Club Hurling Championship: 1987
- Tipperary Senior Hurling Championship: 1981
- North Tipperary Senior Hurling Championship: 1976, 1981

Tipperary

- National Hurling League: 1978-79
- All-Ireland Under-21 Hurling Championship: 1978, 1979
- Munster Under-21 Hurling Championship: 1978, 1979
- All-Ireland Minor Hurling Championship: 1976
- Munster Minor Hurling Championship: 1976
