= Timmy Stapleton =

Irish hurler

Personal information
- Native name: Tadhg Mac an Ghaill (Irish)
- Born: 1957 (age 68–69) Borrisoleigh, County Tipperary, Ireland
- Occupation: Sales rep
- Height: 6 ft 2 in (188 cm)

Sport
- Sport: Hurling
- Position: Full-back
Club
- Years: Club
- Borris–Ileigh
Club titles
- Tipperary titles: 3
- Munster titles: 1
- All-Ireland Titles: 1
Inter-county
Years	County	Apps (scores)
1980-1983	Tipperary	1 (0-00)
Inter-county titles
- Munster titles: 0
- All-Irelands: 0
- NHL: 0
- All Stars: 0

Timothy Stapleton (born 1957) is an Irish former hurler. At club level, he played with Borris–Ileigh and was also a member of the Tipperary senior hurling team.

== Career ==
Stapleton first played hurling as a schoolboy at Templemore Vocational School while also playing at underage levels with the Borris–Ileigh club. His career with the club's senior team spanned three decades, during which time he won four North Tipperary SHC titles and three Tipperary SHC titles between 1976 and 1988. He was at full-back of the Borris–Ileigh team that beat Rathnure in the 1987 All-Ireland club final.

Stapleton first played for Tipperary during a two-year tenure at minor level. He progressed to the under-21 team and was an unused substitute when Tipperary were beaten by Galway in the 1978 All-Ireland under-21 final. Stapleton was drafted onto the senior team's extended panel in 1980 and served as team captain in 1982.

== Honours ==
Borris–Ileigh

- All-Ireland Senior Club Hurling Championship: 1987
- Munster Senior Club Hurling Championship: 1986
- Tipperary Senior Hurling Championship: 1981, 1983, 1986
- North Tipperary Senior Hurling Championship: 1976, 1981, 1983, 1988

Tipperary

- Munster Under-21 Hurling Championship: 1978

Sporting positions
Preceded by Peadar Quealy	Tipperary senior hurling team captain 1982	Succeeded by Liam Bergin
