= Mickey Byrne =

Irish hurler (1923–2016)

Mickey "the Rattler" Byrne
Personal information
- Nickname: The Rattler
- Born: 10 September 1923 Dublin, Ireland
- Died: 16 October 2016 (aged 93) Dublin, Ireland
- Height: 5 ft 8 in (173 cm)

Sport
- Sport: Hurling
- Position: Right corner-back
Club
- Years: Club
- Thurles Sarsfields
Club titles
- Tipperary titles: 14
Inter-county*
Years	County	Apps (scores)
1945-1960	Tipperary	34 (0-00)
Inter-county titles
- Munster titles: 5
- All-Irelands: 5
- NHL: 8
- *Inter County team apps and scores correct as of 16:43, 18 October 2016.

Michael Byrne (10 September 1923 – 16 October 2016), better known as "the Rattler" Byrne, was an Irish hurler whose league and championship career with the Tipperary senior team spanned fifteen years from 1945 to 1960.

Born in Dublin, Byrne first played competitive hurling after his family moved to Thurles, County Tipperary. His skills were developed at Thurles CBS, with Byrne winning a Dean Ryan Cup medal in 1939. His performances at colleges level brought him to the attention of the Thurles Sarsfields selectors, and he simultaneously joined the club's minor team, winning a county minor championship medal in 1940. Byrne subsequently progressed onto the senior team that dominated the championship. In a club career that spanned more than twenty years, he won fourteen county senior championship medals. Byrne retired from club hurling at the age of forty-two following a defeat of Carrick Davins in the 1965 county final.

The Emergency resulted in Byrne never playing in the minor grade for Tipperary, however, he joined the senior panel during the 1945 championship. Over the course of the next fifteen years, he won five All-Ireland medals, beginning with a lone triumph in 1945 as a non-playing substitute, three championships in-a-row from 1949 to 1951 and a final championship in 1958. Byrne also won five Munster medals and eight National Hurling League medals. He retired from inter-county hurling following the conclusion of the 1959-60 league, having made 34 championship appearances for the team.

Having been chosen as a substitute on the Munster interprovincial panel in 1955, Byrne began a three-year association with the team. He won his only Railway Cup medal in 1956 when he was listed amongst the substitutes once again.

Byrne is widely regarded as one of Tipperary's greatest ever players. He has been repeatedly voted onto teams made up of the sport's greats, including at right corner-back on the Tipperary Hurling Team of the Century.

== Early life ==
Mickey Byrne was born in Dublin in 1923. He was educated at Thurles CBS where his hurling skills were first developed. Byrne first tasted success when he won a Dean Ryan Cup medal in 1939. He later tasted much more success with both club and county.

== Playing career ==
=== Club ===
Byrne played his club hurling with the famous Thurles Sarsfields club. He won a county medal at minor level in 1940 and quickly graduated onto the club’s senior team. The rest of the 1940s saw him win a three-in-a-row of senior 1944, 1945 and 1946. The 1950s saw Byrne winning county honours in 1952, before winning five consecutive titles in 1955 (Capt.), 1956 (Capt.), 1957, 1958 and 1959. He finished off his club career by winning a second five-in-a-row in 1961, 1962, 1963, 1964 and 1965. Byrne’s tally of 14 county titles is a record which still stands today.

=== Inter-county ===
Byrne first came to prominence on the inter-county scene as a member of the Tipperary minor team that lost the 1941 Munster final to Cork. He later joined the county senior team and was a non-playing substitute when Tipp won both Munster and All-Ireland honours in 1945. Four years later in 1949, Byrne was a full member of the team as he won his first National Hurling League medal before later winning a first Munster title. Tipp later defeated Laois in the championship decider, giving Byrne his first All-Ireland medal. He won a second set of National League and Munster honours in 1950 and, once again, Tipp reached the championship decider. Kilkenny fell in the final and Byrne won a second All-Ireland medal. 1951 saw Byrne add a third Munster medal to his collection as Tipp qualified for a third consecutive All-Ireland final appearance. Wexford were the opponents, however, the Munstermen had the upper-hand and Byrne won a third All-Ireland medal in-a-row.

The following few years saw little in the way of championship success for Tipperary, however, Byrne won further National League medals in 1952, 1954, 1955 and 1957. Tipp were back in championship form in 1958 and Byrne won a fourth Munster medal. This was later converted into a fourth All-Ireland medal following a victory over Galway. He won his seventh and eighth National League medals in 1959 and 1960 and retired from inter-county hurling.

Byrne was named in the Tipperary GAA Hurling Team of the Millennium in 2000.

=== Munster ===
Byrne won a Railway Cup medal with Munster in 1955.

== Later life ==
Byrne died on 16 October 2016 aged 93. Thurles Sarsfields went on to win their 35th County Championship later that day to honor his memory. Many tributes were paid to him after his death including the Tipperary county board chairman Michael Bourke saying he was a unique character whose death leaves a huge void in the annals of Tipperary Hurling and Folklore "As Tipperary County Board Chairman, I am privileged to have known The Rattler and to see at first hand the charisma and warmth that he exuded to everyone in his presence, his record on the hurling playing fields speaks for itself and will stand the testament of time for one who dedicated his life to Tipperary and his club Thurles Sarsfields."

== Honours ==
=== Team ===
Thurles Sarsfields

- Tipperary Minor Hurling Championship (1): 1940
- Tipperary Senior Hurling Championship (14): 1944, 1945, 1946, 1952, 1955, 1956 (c), 1957 (c), 1958, 1959, 1961, 1962, 1963, 1964, 1965
- Mid Tipperary Senior Hurling Championship (16): 1942, 1944, 1945, 1946, 1950, 1952, 1955, 1956, 1957, 1958, 1959, 1960, 1961, 1962, 1963, 1964

Tipperary

- All-Ireland Senior Hurling Championship (5): 1945, 1949, 1950, 1951, 1958
- Munster Senior Hurling Championship (4): 1949, 1950, 1951, 1958
- National Hurling League (8): 1948-49, 1949–50, 1951–52, 1953–54, 1954–55, 1956–57, 1958–59, 1959–60
- Oireachtas Cup (2): 1945, 1949

Munster

- Railway Cup (1): 1955

=== Individual ===
Honours

- Tipperary Hurling Team of the Century: Right corner-back

Preceded by John Doyle	Tipperary Senior Hurling Captain; 1956-1957	Succeeded by Tony Wall
