= Philly Ryan =

Irish hurler

Personal information
- Native name: Pilib Ó Riain (Irish)
- Nickname: Sally cap
- Born: 1916 Borrisoleigh, County Tipperary, Ireland

Sport
- Sport: Hurling
Club
- Years: Club
- Borris–Ileigh
Club titles
- Tipperary titles: 3
Inter-county
- Years: County
- 1937–1951: Tipperary
Inter-county titles
- Munster titles: 0
- All-Irelands: 0
- NHL: 0

Phillip "Philly" Ryan (1916–1991) was an Irish hurler who played for the Tipperary senior team.

Born in Borrisoleigh, County Tipperary, Ryan first arrived on the inter-county scene at the age of seventeen when he first linked up with the Tipperary minor team. He joined the senior panel during the 1937 championship. Ryan was a non-playing substitute for that year but was recalled to the team fourteen years later. During that time he won two All-Ireland medals and two Munster medals as a non-playing substitute.

At club level Ryan was a three-time championship medallist with Borris–Ileigh.

Ryan retired from inter-county hurling following the conclusion of the 1951 championship.

In retirement from playing Ryan became involved in team management and coaching. He was a selector with the Tipperary under-21 team between 1969 and 1970.

== Honours ==
=== Player ===
Borris–Ileigh

- Tipperary Senior Hurling Championship (3): 1949, 1950, 1953

Tipperary

- All-Ireland Senior Hurling Championship (2): 1937 (sub), 1951 (sub)
- Munster Senior Hurling Championship (2): 1937 (sub), 1951 (sub)
