= Ned Ryan =

Irish hurler

Personal information
- Born: Borrisoleigh, County Tipperary

Sport
- Sport: Hurling
- Position: Right half forward
Club
- Years: Club
- 1950s: Borris–Ileigh
Inter-county
- Years: County
- 1950's: Tipperary
Inter-county titles
- Munster titles: 2
- All-Irelands: 2

Ned Ryan, is a former Irish hurler. He played hurling with his local club Borris–Ileigh in the 1950s and was a member of the Tipperary senior inter-county team that won the Munster Senior Hurling Championship and the All-Ireland in 1950 and 1951. He started both All-Ireland final's in the number ten position in the half forward line, and scored a goal in the 1951 All Ireland final against Wexford.
