= Paddy Kenny (hurler) =

Irish hurler

Personal information
- Native name: Pádraig Ó Cionnaith (Irish)
- Born: 1929 Borrisoleigh, County Tipperary, Ireland
- Died: 18 April 2004 (aged 74) Thurles, County Tipperary, Ireland
- Height: 5 ft 8 in (173 cm)

Sport
- Sport: Hurling
- Position: Forward
Clubs
- Years: Club
- 1947-1954 1955-1957: Borrisoleigh; Thurles Sarsfields
Club titles
- Tipperary titles: 6
Inter-county*
Years	County	Apps (scores)
1948-1957	Tipperary	21 (15-46)
Inter-county titles
- Munster titles: 3
- All-Irelands: 3
- NHL: 5
- *Inter County team apps and scores correct as of 22:19, 20 April 2015.

Patrick Kenny (1929 – 18 April 2004) was an Irish sportsperson. He played hurling with his local club Borrisoleigh and with the Tipperary senior inter-county team in the 1940s and 1950s. Kenny is regarded as one of Tipperary's greatest-ever players.

== Playing career ==
=== Club ===
Kenny played his club hurling with his local Borrisoleigh club and enjoyed much success. He won three senior county titles with the club in 1949, 1950 and 1953.

=== Inter-county ===
Kenny first came to prominence on the inter-county scene as a member of the Tipperary minor hurling team in the mid-1940s. He won a Munster medal in this grade in 1945, however, Tipp later lost the All-Ireland final to Dublin. In 1946 Kenny won a second Munster minor title, however, Dublin overcame Tipp in the championship decider for a second consecutive year. In 1947 Kenny was captain of the Tipperary minor team. That year he captured his third consecutive Munster medal before later leading his team out in Croke Park for the championship decider. Galway provided the opposition on that occasion, however, it was Tipp who won the game, giving Kenny an All-Ireland minor medal.

Kenny later joined the Tipperary senior team. He won his first Munster senior medal after coming on as a substitute in Tipp's 1949 provincial final victory over Limerick. Kenny later lined out in his first championship decider at Croke Park where Laois, the surprise winners of the Leinster championship, provided the opposition. The game turned into a rout as Tipp trounced Laois on a score line of 3–11 to 0-3 giving Kenny his first senior All-Ireland medal. In 1950 Kenny added a National Hurling League title to his collection before winning a second Munster title following a victory over arch-rivals Cork. This victory allowed Tipp to advance to the All-Ireland final where Kilkenny were the opponents. It was Tipp, however, who won a close and uninteresting final on a score line of 1–9 to 1-8 giving Kenny his second All-Ireland medal. 1951 saw Tipp aim to capture a third championship in-a-row. The year began well with the Premier County getting the better of Cork in the Munster final. That victory gave Kenny his third provincial title and allowed Tipp to play in their third consecutive championship decider. Wexford took on Tipp in that game, however, victory went to the Munstermen on a score line of 7–7 to 3–9. Kenny had captured his third consecutive All-Ireland medal. With the three-in-a-row under their belt the men from Tipperary launched an all out bid to capture a fourth championship in-a-row. Things started well in 1952 with Kenny winning a second National League title. Tipperary, however, were later beaten by Cork in a thrilling Munster final. In 1954 Kenny won a third National League medal, however, Cork went on to defeat Tipp in a third consecutive Munster final. Three years later in 1957 he won a fourth National League medal before retiring from inter-county activity following Tipp's exit from the championship.

=== Provincial ===
Kenny also lined out with Munster in the inter-provincial hurling championship. He won four Railway Cup titles in 1951, 1952, 1953 and 1957.

== Family ==
Kenny's brothers Seán Kenny and Phippi Kenny also won senior All-Ireland hurling medals with Tipperary.

== Honours ==
CBS Thurles

- All-Ireland Colleges Interprovincial Hurling Championship: 1945, 1946

Borris-Ileigh

- Tipperary Senior Hurling Championship: 1949, 1950, 1953

Thurles Sarsfields

- Tipperary Senior Hurling Championship: 1955, 1956, 1957

Tipperary

- All-Ireland Senior Hurling Championship: 1949, 1950, 1951
- Munster Senior Hurling Championship: 1949, 1950, 1951
- National Hurling League: 1948–49, 1949–50, 1951–52, 1953–54, 1956–57
- All-Ireland Minor Hurling Championship: 1947 (c)
- Munster Minor Hurling Championship: 1945, 1946 (c), 1947 (c)

Munster

- Railway Cup: 1951, 1952, 1953, 1957

Sporting positions
Preceded by Pat Stakelum	Tipperary minor hurling team captain 1946-1947	Succeeded by
Achievements
Preceded by George Sutton	All-Ireland Minor Hurling Final winning captain 1947	Succeeded by Mick Flannelly
