= Gerry Stapleton =

Irish hurler

Personal information
- Born: 1958 (age 67–68) Borrisoleigh, County Tipperary, Ireland
- Occupation: Hardware assistant

Sport
- Sport: Hurling
- Position: Centre-back
Club
- Years: Club
- Borris–Ileigh
Club titles
- Tipperary titles: 3
- Munster titles: 1
- All-Ireland Titles: 1
Inter-county*
Years	County	Apps (scores)
1978-1987	Tipperary	7 (0-03)
Inter-county titles
- Munster titles: 1
- All-Irelands: 0
- NHL: 1
- All Stars: 0
- *Inter County team apps and scores correct as of 14:15, 27 August 2021.

Gerard Stapleton (born 1958) is an Irish former hurler. At club level he played with Borris–Ileigh and was also a member of the Tipperary senior hurling team. He usually lined out as a centre-back.

== Career ==
Stapleton first played juvenile and underage levels with the Borris–Ileigh club before joining the club's senior team. He won three County Championship titles, before winning an All-Ireland Club Championship title in 1987. Stapleton first appeared on the inter-county scene with the Tipperary minor team that won the All-Ireland Minor Championship in 1976. He progressed onto the Tipperary under-21 team and won an All-Ireland Under-21 Championship title in 1979. By this stage Stapleton had already been drafted onto the Tipperary senior hurling team. He spent more than a decade with the team and won National Hurling League and Munster Championship honours.

== Honours ==
Borris–Ileigh

- All-Ireland Senior Club Hurling Championship: 1987
- Munster Senior Club Hurling Championship: 1986
- Tipperary Senior Hurling Championship: 1981, 1983, 1986

Tipperary

- Munster Senior Hurling Championship: 1987
- National Hurling League: 1978-79
- All-Ireland Under-21 Hurling Championship: 1979
- Munster Under-21 Hurling Championship: 1978, 1979
- All-Ireland Minor Hurling Championship: 1976
- Munster Minor Hurling Championship: 1976
