= 1957 Railway Cup Hurling Championship =

Irish hurling competition

1957 Railway Cup
- Date: 17 February 1957 - 17 March 1957
- Teams: Connacht; Leinster; Munster; Ulster
- Champions: Munster; Mick Cashman (captain)
- Runners-up: Leinster; Jim English (captain)

Tournament statistics
- Matches played: 4
- Goals scored: 28 (7 per match)
- Points scored: 62 (15.5 per match)
- Top scorer(s): Christy Ring (5-10)

The 1957 Railway Cup Hurling Championship was the 31st series of the inter-provincial hurling Railway Cup. Four matches were played between 17 February 1957 and 17 March 1957 to decide the title. It was contested by Connacht, Leinster, Munster and Ulster.

Leinster entered the championship as the defending champions.

On 17 March 1957, Munster won the Railway Cup after a 5–07 to 2–05 defeat of Leinster in the final at Croke Park, Dublin. It was their 23rd Railway Cup title overall and their first Railway Cup title since 1955.

Munster's Christy Ring was the Railway Cup top scorer with 5–10.

== Results ==
=== Semi-finals ===
17 February 1957 Semi-final	Munster	3-11 - 3-11	Connacht	Gaelic Grounds, Limerick
	C Ring 1-3, P Barry 1-2, P Kenny 1-0, J Smyth 0-2, M Ryan 0-2, D Kelly 0-1, P Stakelum 0-1.		J Molloy 2-2, P Egan 1-1, B Duffy 0-4, J Duggan 0-2, J Salmon 0-1, M Cullinane 0-1.	Referee: T O'Sullivan (Limerick)

17 February 1957 Semi-final	Ulster	2-05 - 7-07	Leinster	Casement Park, Belfast
	R McMullan 1-1, P Mullaney 1-1, F Fahy 0-2, D Cormican 0-1.		S Clohessy 2-4, M Kenny 1-1, W Walsh 1-1, D Rockett 1-0, B Dwyer 1-0, N Rackard 1-0, L Cashin 0-1.	Referee: J Howard (Limerick)

3 March 1957 Semi-final replay	Munster	6-06 - 0-10	Connacht	Gaelic Grounds, Limerick
	P Kenny 2-1, F Walsh 2-0, C Ring 1-2, T Kelly 1-1, D Kelly 0-2.		J Salmon 0-2, J Molloy 0-2, J Duggan 0-2, B O'Neill 0-2, P Egan 0-1, S Collins 0-1.	Referee: T O'Sullivan (Limerick)

=== Final ===
17 March 1957 Final	Munster	5-07 - 2-05	Leinster	Croke Park, Dublin
	C Ring 3-5, P Barry 1-0, F Walsh 1-0, J O'Connor 0-1, M Ryan 0-1.		B Dwyer 1-2, M Kenny 1-0, N Rackard 0-1, W Walsh 0-1, T Flood 0-1.	Attendance: 43,805; Referee: C McLoughlin (Dublin)

== Top scorers ==
Overall

Rank	Player	County	Tally	Total	Matches	Average
1	Christy Ring	Munster	5-10	25	3	8.33
2	Paddy Kenny	Munster	3-01	10	3	3.33
2	Seán Clohessy	Leinster	2-04	10	2	5.00
2	John Molloy	Connacht	2-04	10	2	5.00

Single game

Rank	Player	County	Tally	Total	Opposition
1	Christy Ring	Munster	3-05	14	Leinster
2	Seán Clohessy	Leinster	2-04	10	Ulster
3	John Molloy	Connacht	2-02	8	Munster
4	Paddy Kenny	Munster	2-01	7	Connacht
5	Christy Ring	Munster	1-03	6	Connacht

== Sources ==
- Donegan, Des, The Complete Handbook of Gaelic Games (DBA Publications Limited, 2005).
