= Gerry Doyle (hurler) =

Irish hurler

Personal information
- Native name: Gearóid Ó Dúil (Irish)
- Born: 1913 Thurles, County Tipperary, Ireland
- Died: 13 November 1975 (aged 62) Thurles, County Tipperary, Ireland
- Occupation: Cobbler

Sport
- Sport: Hurling
- Position: Goalkeeper
Clubs
- Years: Club
- Thurles Kickhams; Thurles Sarsfield's
Club titles
- Tipperary titles: 6
Inter-county
- Years: County
- 1937-1945: Tipperary
Inter-county titles
- Munster titles: 2
- All-Irelands: 2
- NHL: 0

Gerry Doyle (1913 – 13 November 1975) was an Irish hurler who played as a goalkeeper for the Tipperary senior team.

Born in Thurles, County Tipperary, Doyle first arrived on the inter-county scene when he first linked up with the Tipperary senior team. He joined the senior panel during the 1937 championship. Doyle went on to retain the position of reserve goalkeeper during a successful era for the team, and won two All-Ireland medals and two Munster medals as a non-playing substitute.

At club level Doyle won six championship medals with Thurles Sarsfield's, having begun his career with Thurles Kickhams.

His brother, Tommy, and his sons, Jimmy and Paddy Doyle, also enjoyed All-Ireland success with Tipperary.

Doyle's retirement came following the conclusion of the 1945 championship.

== Honours ==
=== Player ===
Thurles Sarsfield's

- Tipperary Senior Hurling Championship (6): 1938, 1939, 1942, 1944, 1945, 1946

Tipperary

- All-Ireland Senior Hurling Championship (2): 1937 (sub), 1945 (sub)
- Munster Senior Hurling Championship (2): 1937 (sub), 1945 (sub)
