= 1986 Tipperary Senior Hurling Championship =

Gaelic sports competition

- Dates: 24 August - 28 September 1986
- Teams: 8
- Champions: Borris-Ileigh (6th title); Mick Ryan (captain); Paddy Doyle (manager)
- Runners-up: Kilruane MacDonaghs; Tony Sheppard (captain); Len Gaynor (manager)

Tournament statistics
- Matches played: 7
- Goals scored: 27 (3.86 per match)
- Points scored: 149 (21.29 per match)
- Top scorer(s): Philip Kenny (1-15)

The 1986 Tipperary Senior Hurling Championship was the 95th staging of the Tipperary Senior Hurling Championship since its establishment by the Tipperary County Board in 1887.

Kilruane MacDonaghs entered the championship as the defending champions.

On 28 September 1986, Borris-Ileigh won the championship after a 0-14 to 0-07 defeat of Kilruane MacDonaghs in the final at Semple Stadium. It was their sixth championship title overall and their first title since 1983. It remains their last championship triumph.

== Results ==
=== Quarter-finals ===
24 August 1986 Quarter-final	Loughmore-Castleiney	3-23 - 1-07	Golden-Kilfeacle	Leahy Park
	M McGrath 1-3, J Treacy 1-2, P McGrath 0-5, T Larkin 1-1, L Cormack 0-4, N Ryan 0-3, T McGrath 0-2, F McGrath 0-2, P Treacy 0-1.		L O'Sullivan 0-5, T Leamy 1-0, D Fogarty 0-1, T Cooney 0-1.

24 August 1986 Quarter-final	Holycross-Ballycahill	2-16 - 1-04	Éire Óg Annacarty	Leahy Park
	S Dwan 1-8, R Stakelum 1-0, T Walsh 0-2, T Lanigan 0-2, P Lowry 0-2, PJ Lanigan 0-1, P Dwan 0-1.		S Fox 1-1, J Quinn 0-2, M Ryan 0-1.

24 August 1986 Quarter-final	Kilruane MacDonaghs	4-13 - 1-06	Éire Óg	St. Michael's Park
	E O'Shea 1-4, Philip Quinlan 1-1, J Williams 1-0, Pat Quinlan 1-0, P Williams 0-3, D Cahill 0-2, Ger Williams 0-1, Gilbert Williams 0-1, D Quinlan 0-1.		J Lyons 0-5, D Ahearn 1-0, M Ahearn 0-1.

31 August 1986 Quarter-final	Borris-Ileigh	3-17 - 5-03	Carrick Swans	Boherlahan Grounds
	P Kenny 1-6, N O'Dwyer 2-2, R Stakelum 0-2, J McGrath 0-2, C Stakelum 0-2, B Ryan 0-1, F Collins 0-1, M Coen 0-1.		MJ Russell 2-0, G Kehoe 2-0, S Fitzpatrick 1-1, G Walsh 0-1, P Murphy 0-1.

=== Semi-finals ===
13 September 1986 Semi-final	Kilruane MacDonaghs	1-14 - 2-08	Loughmore-Castleiney	Leahy Park
	E O'Shea 0-4, P Williams 0-4, P Quinlan 1-0, Ger Williams 0-3, Gilbert Williams 0-2, Jim Williams 0-1.		T McGrath 2-2, P McGrath 0-3, N Ryan 0-1, J Treacy 0-1, F McGrath 0-1.

14 September 1986 Semi-final	Borris-Ileigh	3-10 - 1-07	Holycross-Ballycahill	Páirc Shíleáin
	N O'Dwyer 1-2, C Stakelum 1-2, M Coen 1-1, P Kenny 0-3, R Stakelum 0-2, B Kenny 0-1.		D Carr 1-2, T Lanigan 0-2, M Doyle 0-1, R Dwan 0-1, S Dwan 0-1.

=== Final ===
28 September 1986 Final	Borris-Ileigh	0-14 - 0-07	Kilruane MacDonaghs	Semple Stadium
	P Kenny 0-6, A Ryan 0-3, N O'Dwyer 0-3, C Stakelum 0-1, R Stakelum 0-1.		Ger Williams 0-2, S Hennessy 0-2, J Williams 0-1, P Quinlan 0-1, P Williams 0-1.

== Championship statistics ==
=== Top scorers ===
Overall

Rank	Player	Club	Tally	Total	Matches	Average
1	Philip Kenny	Borris-Ileigh	1-15	18	3	6.00
2	Noel O'Dwyer	Borris-Ileigh	3-07	16	3	5.33
3	Stephen Dwan	Holycross-Ballycahill	1-09	12	2	6.00
4	Eamon O'Shea	Kilruane MacDonaghs	1-08	11	3	3.66
5	Tom McGrath	Loughmore-Castleiney	2-04	10	2	5.00

In a single game

Rank	Player	Club	Tally	Total	Opposition
1	Stephen Dwan	Holycross-Ballycahill	1-08	11	Éire Óg Annacarty
2	Philip Kenny	Borris-Ileigh	1-06	9	Carrick Swans
3	Noel O'Dwyer	Borris-Ileigh	2-02	8	Carrick Swans
3	Tom McGrath	Loughmore-Castleiney	2-02	8	Kilruane MacDonaghs
5	Eamon O'Shea	Kilruane MacDonaghs	1-04	7	Éire Óg
6	M. J. Russell	Carrick Swans	2-00	6	Borris-Ileigh
6	Gerry Kehoe	Carrick Swans	2-00	6	Borris-Ileigh
6	Michael McGrath	Loughmore-Castleiney	1-03	6	Golden-Kilfeacle
6	Philip Kenny	Borris-Ileigh	0-06	6	Kilruane MacDonaghs
10	John Treacy	Loughmore-Castleiney	1-02	5	Golden-Kilfeacle
10	Noel O'Dwyer	Borris-Ileigh	1-02	5	Holycross-Ballycahill
10	Conor Stakelum	Borris-Ileigh	1-02	5	Holycross-Ballycahill
10	Declan Carr	Holycross-Ballycahill	1-02	5	Borris-Ileigh
10	Pat McGrath	Loughmore-Castleiney	0-05	5	Golden-Kilfeacle
10	Liam O'Sullivan	Golden-Kilfeacle	0-05	5	Loughmore-Castleiney
10	John Lyons	Éire Óg	0-05	5	Kilruane MacDonaghs
