= Conor Stakelum =

Irish hurler and selector

Personal information
- Native name: Conchur Steaclúm (Irish)
- Born: 1968 (age 57–58) Borrisoleigh, County Tipperary, Ireland

Sport
- Sport: Hurling
- Position: Left wing-forward
Club
- Years: Club
- Borris–Ileigh
Club titles
- Tipperary titles: 1
- Munster titles: 1
- All-Ireland Titles: 1
Inter-county
Years	County	Apps (scores)
1988-1995	Tipperary	7 (1-9)
Inter-county titles
- Munster titles: 3
- All-Irelands: 1
- NHL: 1
- All Stars: 0

Conor Stakelum (born 1968) is an Irish hurling selector and former player. He is a former selector with the Tipperary senior team.

Born in Borrisoleigh, County Tipperary, Stakelum was born into a family that had a strong association with hurling. His uncle, Pat Stakelum, was an All-Ireland-winning captain with Tipperary in 1949. Stakelum quickly became involved with the Borris–Ileigh team at underage levels, winning minor and under-21 county championship medals. He quickly progressed onto the senior club team and won a set of All-Ireland, Munster and county senior championship medals during the 1986-87 season.

Stakelum made his debut on the inter-county scene at the age of seventeen when he joined the Tipperary minor team in 1986. After little success in this grade he progressed onto the under-21 team, winning an All-Ireland medal in 1989. Stakelum made his senior debut during the 1987-88 league and collected a National Hurling League medal in his debut season. He was on and off the senior panel over the next few years, but claimed an All-Ireland medal on the field of play in 1991. Stakelum also won three Munster medals as a non-playing substitute. After playing his last game for Tipperary in August 1993, he was recalled to the panel for one final season in 1995.

His brother, Richard Stakelum, and his first cousins, Bobby and Aidan Ryan, also enjoyed All-Ireland success with Tipperary.

Stakelum was also selected on several Munster inter-provincial teams. He was a member of the panel in 1989 and 1991, however, he failed to win a Railway Cup medal.

In retirement from playing Stakelum became involved in team management and coaching. He took charge as manager of the Borris-Ileigh senior team in 2014, before being added to the Tipperary senior team as a selector in 2016. In his debut season in this role he helped guide Tipperary to All-Ireland and Munster successes.

== Honours ==
=== Player ===
Borris–Ileigh

- All-Ireland Senior Club Hurling Championship (1): 1987
- Munster Senior Club Hurling Championship (1): 1986
- Tipperary Senior Hurling Championship (1): 1986
- Tipperary Under-21 Hurling Championship (1): 1987
- Tipperary Minor B Hurling Championship (1): 1985

Tipperary

- All-Ireland Senior Hurling Championship (1): 1991
- Munster Senior Hurling Championship (3): 1988 (sub), 1991 (sub), 1993 (sub)
- All-Ireland Under-21 Hurling Championship (1): 1989
- Munster Under-21 Hurling Championship (1): 1989

=== Selector ===
Tipperary

- All-Ireland Senior Hurling Championship (1): 2016
- Munster Senior Hurling Championship (1): 2016
