= 1950 All-Ireland Senior Hurling Championship final =

1950 All-Ireland Senior Hurling Final
- Event: 1950 All-Ireland Senior Hurling Championship
Tipperary	Kilkenny
1–9	1–8
- Date: 3 September 1950
- Venue: Croke Park, Dublin
- Referee: Con Murphy (Cork)
- Attendance: 67,629

The 1950 All-Ireland Senior Hurling Championship Final was the 63rd All-Ireland Final and the culmination of the 1950 All-Ireland Senior Hurling Championship, an inter-county hurling tournament for the top teams in Ireland. The match was held at Croke Park, Dublin, on 3 September 1950, between Tipperary and Kilkenny. The Leinster champions lost to their Munster opponents on a score line of 1–9 to 1–8.

== Match details ==
1950-09-03
15:15 UTC+1

Tipperary	1–9 – 1–8	Kilkenny

Croke Park, Dublin
Attendance: 67,629
Referee: C. Murphy (Cork)

Tipperary	Kilkenny
