= 1953 Tipperary Senior Hurling Championship =

Annual hurling competition season

- Dates: 30 August – 4 October 1953
- Teams: 4
- Champions: Borris–Ileigh (3rd title); Tim Ryan (captain)
- Runners-up: Boherlahan

Tournament statistics
- Matches played: 3
- Goals scored: 19 (6.33 per match)
- Points scored: 38 (12.67 per match)

The 1953 Tipperary Senior Hurling Championship was the 62nd staging of the Tipperary Senior Hurling Championship since its establishment by the Tipperary County Board in 1887. The championship ran from 30 August to 4 October 1953.

Thurles Sarsfields were the defending champions.

The final was played on 4 October 1953 at Thurles Sportsfield, between Borris–Ileigh and Boherlahan, in what was their first ever meeting in the final. Borris–Ileigh won the match by 4–08 to 4–04 to claim their third championship title overall and a first title in three years.

== Qualification ==
Championship	Champions
Mid Tipperary Senior Hurling Championship	Boherlahan
North Tipperary Senior Hurling Championship	Borris–Ileigh
South Tipperary Senior Hurling Championship	Kilenaule
West Tipperary Senior Hurling Championship	Knockavilla-Donaskeigh Kickhams

== Results ==
=== Semi-finals ===
30 August 1953 Semi-final	Boherlahan	5-09 - 2-04	Killenaule	Leahy Park

20 September 1953 Semi-final	Borris–Ileigh	4-13 - 0-02	Knockavilla-Donaskeigh Kickhams	Leahy Park

=== Final ===
4 October 1953 Final	Borris–Ileigh	4-08 - 4-04	Boherlahan	Thurles Sportsfield
