= Paddy Doyle (Tipperary hurler) =

Irish hurler (1941–2020)

Personal information
- Native name: Pádraig Ó Dúil (Irish)
- Born: 1941 Thurles, County Tipperary, Ireland
- Died: 10 August 2020 (aged 79) Thurles, County Tipperary, Ireland

Sport
- Sport: Hurling
- Position: Left wing-forward
Club
- Years: Club
- Thurles Sarsfields
Club titles
- Tipperary titles: 6
Inter-county
Years	County	Apps (scores)
1965–1966	Tipperary	3 (0–00)
Inter-county titles
- Munster titles: 1
- All-Irelands: 1
- NHL: 0
- All Stars: 0

Patrick Doyle (1941 – 10 August 2020) was an Irish hurler who played as a left wing-forward for the Tipperary senior team.

Born in Thurles, County Tipperary, Doyle first played competitive hurling whilst at school in Thurles CBS. He arrived on the inter-county scene at the age of sixteen when he first linked up with the Tipperary minor teams as a dual player before later joining the under-21, junior and senior Gaelic football teams, captaining the senior side in 1961. He made his senior debut in the 1965 championship. Doyle enjoyed a brief inter-county career and won one All-Ireland medal in 1965 as a non-playing substitute and one Munster medal on the field of play.

At club level Doyle was a six-time championship medallist with Thurles Sarsfields.

His father, Gerry, his uncle, Tommy, and his brother, Jimmy Doyle, also enjoyed All-Ireland success with Tipperary.

Throughout his career Doyle made 3 championship appearances. His retirement came following the conclusion of the 1966 championship.

In retirement from playing Doyle became involved in team management and coaching. He served as coach of the Tipperary minor team for three years. He later managed the Laois senior team between 1991 and 1993.

Doyle died on 10 August 2020.
