= 1950 Tipperary Senior Hurling Championship =

Annual hurling competition season

- Dates: 1 October – 26 November 1950
- Teams: 4
- Champions: Borris–Ileigh (2nd title); Seán Kenny (captain)
- Runners-up: Carrick Davins

Tournament statistics
- Matches played: 3
- Goals scored: 14 (4.67 per match)
- Points scored: 32 (10.67 per match)

The 1950 Tipperary Senior Hurling Championship was the 59th staging of the Tipperary Senior Hurling Championship since its establishment by the Tipperary County Board in 1887. The championship ran from 1 October to 26 November 1950.

Borris–Ileigh were the defending champions.

The final was played on 26 November 1950 at Thurles Sportsfield, between Borris–Ileigh and Carrick Davins, in what was their second meeting in the final overall. Borris–Ileigh won the match by 2–07 to 2–03 to claim their second championship title overall and a second consecutive title.

== Qualification ==
Championship	Champions
Mid Tipperary Senior Hurling Championship	Thurles Sarsfields
North Tipperary Senior Hurling Championship	Borris–Ileigh
South Tipperary Senior Hurling Championship	Carrick Swans
West Tipperary Senior Hurling Championship	Knockavilla Kickhams

== Results ==
=== Semi-finals ===
1 October 1950 Semi-final	Carrick Swans	4-03 - 2-06	Knockavilla Kickhams	Clonmel Sportsfield

22 October 1950 Semi-final	Borris–Ileigh	3-05 - 1-08	Thurles Sarsfields	Thurles Sportsfield

=== Final ===
26 November 1950 Final	Borris–Ileigh	2-07 - 2-03	Carrick Davins	Thurles Sportsfield
