= Jimmy Smyth (hurler) =

Irish hurler

Personal information
- Native name: Séamus Mac Gabhann (Irish)
- Born: 1 January 1931 Ruan, County Clare, Ireland
- Died: 9 February 2013 (aged 82) Clontarf, County Dublin, Ireland
- Occupation: GAA administrator

Sport
- Sport: Hurling
- Position: Full-forward
Club
- Years: Club
- Ruan
Club titles
- Clare titles: 5
Inter-county
Years	County	Apps (scores)
1948–1967	Clare	23 (20–53)
Inter-county titles
- Munster titles: 0
- All-Irelands: 0
- NHL: 0

James Smyth (1 January 1931 – 9 February 2013) was an Irish hurler who played as a full-forward for the Clare senior team.

Smyth made his first appearance for the team during the 1948–49 National Hurling League and was a regular member of the starting fifteen until his retirement after the 1967 championship. During that time he won one Oireachtas medal and one Thomond Feis medal, and was a Munster final runner-up on two occasions.

At club level, Smyth was a five-time county club championship medallist with Ruan.

After retirement from play Smyth, in 1984 he was named on a special Hurling Team of the Century made up of players never to have won an All-Ireland medal. In 2000 he was named on the Munster Hurling Team of the Millennium.

== Playing career ==
=== Colleges ===
Smyth first experienced success on the hurling field during his tenure at St. Flannan's College, a famed hurling nursery in Ennis. At Flan nan's he was a hurling protégé, going straight into the Dean Ryan Cup team as a thirteen-year-old and winning his first medal when Ennis won the junior championship.

In his second year he made his debut on the Harty Cup team. He won his first Harty Cup medal that year as St. Flannan's defeated the North Monastery of Cork to take the title. The subsequent All-Ireland final saw Smyth's side face St Joseph's of Marino. A 7–10 to 2–3 trouncing gave Smyth his first All-Ireland medal.

St Flannan's retained their Harty Cup crown in 1946 following another defeat of the North Mon. O'Connell School from Dublin were the opponents in the All-Ireland final and a close game developed. A 5–7 to 5–2 scoreline gave Smyth his second All-Ireland medal.

Smyth collected a third consecutive Harty Cup medal following a defeat of St. Colman's College in 1947. Once again St Flannan's reached the All-Ireland decider where St Joseph's of Roscrea provided the opposition. A 6–8 to 3–1 victory gave Smyth a third consecutive All-Ireland medal.

At St Flannan's Smyth also won three inter-provincial colleges medals with the Munster selection.

=== Club ===
Smyth played his club hurling with Ruan and enjoyed much success.

In 1948 Smyth represented Ruan in the minor, junior, intermediate and senior grades. It was a successful year as Ruan defeated Clarecastle in the county decider, giving Smyth his first championship medal. He also collected an intermediate championship medal that same year.

Having secured their very first championship title, Ruan captured a second three years later in 1951.

After a period in the doldrums, Smyth's side reached the championship decider once again in 1959. A defeat of Éire Óg gave Smyth his third championship medal. A defeat of Scariff in the final of 1960 gave Ruan a famous two-in-a-row. It was Smyth's fourth championship medal.

Three-in-a-row proved beyond Ruan, however, the team reached the final once again in 1962. Sixmilebridge fell on that occasion, giving Smyth a fifth and final championship medal.

=== Inter-county ===
Smyth first came to prominence on the inter-county scene as a member of the Clare minor hurling team. He made his debut as a fourteen-year-old in 1945 and subsequently set up what must be an all-time record for Clare by playing at this grade for five years in a row. In his debut year, Clare reached the Munster decider. An 8–10 to 0–2 trouncing by Tipperary was Clare's lot on that occasion.

As a seventeen-year-old Smyth made his senior debut in a National Hurling League game against Galway in 1948. He played no part in the subsequent 1949 championship due to his involvement as captain of the Clare junior hurling team. He won a Munster medal in that grade following a 3–3 to 0–6 defeat of Cork. Clare later defeated Kilkenny before facing London in the All-Ireland decider. A close game developed and, at the full-time whistle, Clare were narrowly defeated by 3–7 to 3–6.

Smyth made his senior championship debut in a Munster semi-final defeat by Tipperary in 1950. Within just a few seasons he became known as one of the most prolific scorers in the championship. His 6–4 against Limerick in the Munster quarter-final in 1953 is a record which still stands.

In 1954 Clare qualified for the final of the post-season Oireachtas Tournament. All-Ireland runners-up Wexford provided the opposition on that occasion, however, the game ended in a 2–8 apiece draw. The replay was also a close affair with Clare eventually triumphing by 3–6 to 0–12. It was Smyth's first silverware with the Clare senior hurling team.

The following year Smyth's side dominated the provincial championship. Defeats of Cork and Tipperary led to Clare being installed as the favourites to take the Munster crown for the first time since 1932. Limerick provided the opposition and went on to defeat an optimistic Clare side by 2–15 to 2–6.

Smyth added a Thomond Feis medal to his collection in 1956 as Clare won the pre-season warm-up tournament.

In late 1964 Smyth dropped out of the Clare team. This was surprising as he was just as prolific as ever, scoring 16–27 for Clare in seven outings in 1963. His retirement from the inter-county scene at this stage was premature but he returned to play for the Clare intermediate team in 1966 before making a return to the Clare senior team in 1967. That year he lined out in his second-ever Munster decider. A 4–12 to 2–6 defeat by Tipperary brought the curtain down on Smyth's inter-county career.

=== Inter-provincial ===
Smyth also had the honour of lining out with Munster in the inter-provincial series of games. He first lined out for the team in 1952 and was an unused substitute as Munster claimed the Railway Cup that year.

By 1955 Smyth had made his way onto the starting fifteen. He won his first Railway Cup medal on the field of play that year as Munster defeated Connacht by 6–8 to 3–4.

After surrendering their title in 1956, Munster bounced back the following year with Smyth lining out in the forwards. A 5–7 to 2–5 defeat of Leinster gave him his second Railway Cup medal. It was the first of five successive Railway Cup titles for Munster with Smyth playing a prominent role in all of those successes.

Six-in-a-row proved beyond Munster, however, the province reached the Railway Cup decider again in 1963. A narrow 2–8 to 2–7 defeat of Leinster in a replay gave Smyth his seventh Railway Cup medal on the field of play and an eight overall. It was also his last appearance for Munster.

== Personal life ==
Born in Ruan, County Clare, Smyth received his first schooling at Kells National School, where his mother was a teacher and hurling enthusiast. His uncle had lined out as a hurler for Clare. Smyth later received his secondary schooling at St Flannan's College in Ennis.

In 1959 Smyth married Veronica Gleeson from Coore, Mullagh, and they came to live in Ennis. They had four children Ann Patrica Brighid and Peter. In 1964 Smyth was appointed to an executive position in Croke Park and he and his family moved to Dublin.

Following his retirement in 1988 Smyth studied philosophy at Trinity College, Dublin, where he completed his Bachelor of Arts degree in 1993. His Master of Arts thesis was based on the songs, poems and recitations of Gaelic games in Munster.

Jimmy Smyth died on 9 February 2013.

== Honours ==
=== Team ===
St Flannan's College

- Dr Croke Cup: 1945, 1946, 1947
- Dr Harty Cup: 1945, 1946, 1947

Ruan

- Clare Senior Club Hurling Championship: 1948, 1951, 1959, 1960, 1962

Clare

- Oireachtas Tournament: 1954
- Thomond Feis: 1956

Munster

- Railway Cup: 1952 (sub), 1955, 1957, 1958, 1959, 1960, 1961, 1963

=== Individual ===
Awards

- Hurling Team of the Century (non-All-Ireland winners): 1984
- Munster Hurling Team of the Millennium: 2000
