= Richard Stakelum =

Irish hurler and manager

Personal information
- Born: 28 March 1963 (age 63) Borrisoleigh, County Tipperary, Ireland
- Occupation: Primary School Teacher
- Height: 5 ft 10 in (178 cm)

Sport
- Sport: Hurling
- Position: Right half back
Club
- Years: Club
- 1980's-1990's: Borris–Ileigh
Club titles
- Tipperary titles: 2
- Munster titles: 1
- All-Ireland Titles: 1
Inter-county
- Years: County
- 1987-1989: Tipperary
Inter-county titles
- Munster titles: 3
- All-Irelands: 1

Richard Stakelum (born 28 March 1963) is an Irish hurling manager and former player. He is the current manager of the Dublin under-21 hurling team.

Stakelum enjoyed a successful playing career at club level with Borris–Ileigh and at inter-county level with Tipperary. He was a member of the latter team in the late 1980s and captained them to a first Munster title in sixteen years in 1987. Stakelum also captured All-Ireland, Munster and county honours at club level.

In retirement from playing Stakelum became involved in team management. At club level he brought the Kilmacud Crokes minor hurling team to championship victory in 2007. He has been a selector under the management of Anthony Daly on the Dublin senior hurling team since 2008. Stakelum was appointed manager of the Dublin under-21 hurling team in 2009.

== Playing career ==
=== Club ===
Stakelum played club hurling with his local Borris–Ileigh club and enjoyed much success.

In 1983 the club qualified for the final of the county senior championship and Stakelum was a key member of the half-back line. Loughmore–Castleiney provided the opposition, however, victory went to Stakelum's side by 0-17 to 1-11. The club later represented Tipperary in the provincial series of games and even reached the final. Midleton were the opponents and claimed the Munster title, but not after Borris-Ileigh took them to a draw and a replay.

Three years later in 1986 Borris–Ileigh were back in the county championship decider. Reigning champions Kilruane MacDonagh's provided the opposition, but Borris–Ileigh were more than a match and powered to a 0-14 to 0-7 win. It was Stakelum's second county title. Borris–Ileigh later reached the provincial club final again, with Clarecastle lining out against them. A 1-13 to 1-9 victory gave Stakelum a Munster club winners' medal. Borris–Ileigh subsequently qualified for the All-Ireland final where Wexford champions Rathnure provided the opposition. Goals at key moments proved the match-winner as a 2-9 to 0-9 score line gave Stakelum an All-Ireland club winners' medal.

=== Inter-county ===
Stakelum first came to prominence on the inter-county scene in the mid-1980s as a member of the Tipperary under-21 hurling team. He won a Munster title in this grade in 1984 following a narrow 0-12 to 1-8 victory over Limerick. Tipp later qualified for the centenary-year All-Ireland final against near-rivals Kilkenny. A close-game developed over the course of the hour, however, a 1-12 to 0-11 defeat was Stakelum's lot.

Stakelum later joined the Tipperary senior inter-county team. He made his debut against Wexford in the National Hurling League in 1986, however, he remained on the fringes of the team for the remainder of the year.

In 1987 Stakelum was appointed captain of the Tipperary team. That year Tipperary reached the Munster final and had the chance to deny arch-rivals Cork of a record-breaking sixth successive provincial title. An exciting game developed, however, at the full-time whistle both sides were level and a replay was required. The replay in FitzGerald Stadium, Killarney has gone down in history as one of the great provincial finals. At full-time both sides were level again and extra-time was played. Tipp eventually won the game by 4-22 to 1-22. It was the end of sixteen barren years for the county. After the presentation of the cup Stakelum gave one of the most memorable Munster final acceptance speeches as he roared defiantly that 'the famine was over.' He also led the Tipperary supporters in a rendition of the county song Slievenamon. Unfortunately, Stakelum's side were subsequently defeated by Galway in the All-Ireland semi-final.

The following year Stakelum returned to the fringes of the Tipperary team, however, he did win a second Munster title as a non-playing substitute. Tipp later qualified for the All-Ireland final where old rivals Galway provided the opposition. Stakelum made no appearance in that game, which Galway eventually won by 1-15 to 0-14.

Stakelum's role on the Tipp team became ever more peripheral in 1989. He made a few cameo appearances in the National League, however, he was later included as a substitute on the Tipp championship team. He won a third Munster title, albeit as a non-playing sub, before Tipperary qualified for a second successive All-Ireland final. Antrim were the opponents, however, Tipp steam-rolled the Ulstermen by 4-24 to 3-9. Stakelum played no part but did collect an All-Ireland winners' medal as a substitute. His involvement with the Tipperary team ended shortly after this victory.

== Post-playing career ==
Stakelum moved to Dublin and taught in St Killian's SNS in Tallaght during the 1980s. He is currently the manager of the Kilmacud Crokes minor hurling team. Described by many as an inspirational leader, Stakelum brought the team to Dublin Minor Hurling Championship glory in 2007. In late 2008, Stakelum was chosen to be part of Dublin Senior Hurling management team which was led by Clare legend Anthony Daly.

Sporting positions
Preceded by Tony Sheppard	Tipperary Senior Hurling Captain; 1987	Succeeded by Pat O'Neill
Preceded by Ciaran Barr	Dublin Under-21 Hurling Manager; 2009-present	Succeeded by Incumbent
