= 1951 All-Ireland Senior Hurling Championship final =

1951 All-Ireland Senior Hurling Final
- Event: 1951 All-Ireland Senior Hurling Championship
Tipperary	Wexford
7–7	3–9
- Date: 2 September 1951
- Venue: Croke Park, Dublin
- Referee: W. O'Donoghue (Limerick)
- Attendance: 68,515

The 1951 All-Ireland Senior Hurling Championship Final was the 64th All-Ireland Final and the culmination of the 1951 All-Ireland Senior Hurling Championship, an inter-county hurling tournament for the top teams in Ireland. The match was held at Croke Park, Dublin, on 2 September 1951, between Wexford and Tipperary. The Leinster champions, Wexford, lost to their Munster opponents, Tipperary, on a score line of 7–7 to 3–9.

== Match details ==
1951-09-02
15:15 UTC+1

Tipperary	7–7 – 3–9	Wexford

Croke Park, Dublin
Attendance: 68,515
Referee: W. O'Donoghue (Limerick)

Tipperary	Wexford
