= 1949 Tipperary Senior Hurling Championship =

Annual hurling competition season

- Dates: 9 October – 30 October 1949
- Teams: 4
- Champions: Borris-Ileigh (1st title); Seán Kenny (captain)
- Runners-up: Kickhams

Tournament statistics
- Matches played: 3
- Goals scored: 12 (4 per match)
- Points scored: 21 (7 per match)

The 1949 Tipperary Senior Hurling Championship was the 58th staging of the Tipperary Senior Hurling Championship since its establishment by the Tipperary County Board in 1887. The championship ran from 9 October to 30 October 1949.

Holycross–Ballycahill were the defending champions.

The final was played on 30 October 1949 at Thurles Sportsfield, between Borris–Ileigh and first-time finalists Kickhams. Borris–Ileigh won the match by 4–06 to 2–01 to claim their first ever championship title.

== Qualification ==
Championship	Champions
Mid Tipperary Senior Hurling Championship	Borris–Ileigh
North Tipperary Senior Hurling Championship	Roscrea
South Tipperary Senior Hurling Championship	Ballingarry
West Tipperary Senior Hurling Championship	Knockavilla–Donaskeigh Kickhams

== Results ==
=== Semi-finals ===
9 October 1949 Semi-final	Knockavilla–Donaskeigh Kickhams	2-07 - 0-01	Ballingarry	Leahy Park

16 October 1949 Semi-final	Borris–Ileigh	2-04 - 2-02	Roscrea	MacDonagh Park

=== Final ===
30 October 1949 Final	Borris–Ileigh	4-06 - 2-01	Knockavilla–Donaskeigh Kickhams	Thurles Sportsfield
