= 1945 All-Ireland Senior Hurling Championship =

All-Ireland champions
- Winning team: Tipperary (13th win)
- Captain: John Maher

All-Ireland Finalists
- Losing team: Kilkenny
- Captain: Peter Blanchfield

Provincial champions
- Munster: Tipperary
- Leinster: Kilkenny
- Ulster: Not Played
- Connacht: Not Played

Championship statistics
- Top Scorer: Jim Langton (0–28)
- All-Star Team: See here

The All-Ireland Senior Hurling Championship 1945 was the 59th series of the All-Ireland Senior Hurling Championship, Ireland's premier hurling knock-out competition. Tipperary won the championship, beating Kilkenny 5–6 to 3–6 in the final.

== Format ==
The All-Ireland Senior Hurling Championship was run on a provincial basis as usual. All games were played on a knockout basis whereby once a team lost they were eliminated from the championship. The format for the All-Ireland series of games ran as follows:

- The winners of the Leinster Championship advanced directly to the first All-Ireland semi-final.
- Galway, a team who faced no competition in the Connacht Championship, entered the championship at the All-Ireland semi-final stage where they played the Leinster winners.
- The winners of the Munster Championship advanced directly to the second All-Ireland semi-final.
- The winners of the Ulster Championship advanced directly to the second All-Ireland semi-final where they played the Munster champions.

== Provincial championships ==
=== Leinster Senior Hurling Championship ===
First round

13 May 1945 First round	Kilkenny	2–11 – 2–04	Wexford	Nowlan Park

13 May 1945 First round	Meath	1–04 – 2–07	Westmeath	St. Loman's Park

20 May 1945 First round	Offaly	5–03 – 4–06	Laois	St. Brendan's Park

27 May 1945 First round	Wicklow	7–05 – 10–06	Dublin	Ashford

27 May 1945 First round replay	Laois	3–04 – 5–03	Offaly	O'Moore Park

Semi-finals

3 June 1945 Semi-final	Kilkenny	4–15 – 2–01	Offaly	Nowlan Park

17 June 1945 Semi-final	Dublin	8–03 – 2–04	Westmeath	Tullamore Sportsfield

1 July 1945 Semi-final replay	Kilkenny	4–15 – 2–01	Offaly	Nowlan Park

Final

15 July 1945 Final	Kilkenny	5–12 – 3–04	Dublin	Croke Park
	J Langton 0–8, J Gargan 2–0, S O'Brien 1–1, T Walton 1–1, J Mulcahy 1–0, L Reidy 0–1, D Kennedy 0–1.		J Gray 1–1, D Cantwell 1–1, M Ryan 1–0, M Lyons 0–2.

=== Munster Senior Hurling Championship ===
First round

13 May 1945 First round	Kerry	0–01 – 8–06	Clare	Austin Stack Park, Tralee
	Flaherty 0–1.		McAllister 6–1, Nugent 1–0, Helon 1–0, Leahy 0–1, Murphy 0–1, Whelan 0–1.

10 June 1945 First round	Tipperary	3–06 – 0–03	Waterford	Páirc Mac Gearailt, Fermoy
	J Coffey 2–0, Dwyer 1–1, P Doyle 0–1, H Goldsboro 0–1, J Maher 0–1, T Wall 0–1, T Brennan 0–1.		Moylan 0–1, V Baston 0–1, Barron 0–1.

Semi-finals

24 June 1945 Semi-final	Clare	3–03 – 3–06	Limerick	Cusack Park, Ennis
	J Solon 2–1, McAllister 1–0, Frost 0–1, D Solon 0–1.		M Mackey 1–2, J Mackey 1–1, J Clohessy 1–0, D Stokes 0–2, Herbert 0–1.

1 July 1945 Semi-final	Tipperary	2–13 – 3–02	Cork	Thurles Sportsfield, Thurles
	T Doyle 1–4, M Ryan 1–2, J Maher 0–2, T Brennan 0–2, J Coffey 0–1, T Ryan 0–1, H Goldboro 0–1.		J Quirke 1–1, J Lynch 1–0, P Healy 1–0, S Condon 0–1,

Final

15 July 1945 Final	Tipperary	4–03 – 2–06	Limerick	Thurles Sportsfield, Thurles
	M Ryan 1–3, O'Keeffe 1–0, E GLeeson 1–0, J Dwyer 1–0.		M Mackey 1–2, P McCarthy 1–0, J Mackey 0–1, D Stokes 0–2, J Clohessy 0–1.	Attendance: 25,000

== All-Ireland Senior Hurling Championship ==
=== Bracket ===
Semi-finals; 29 July / 5 August
Kilkenny	5–03
Galway	2–11
Tipperary	5–09
Antrim	1–06

All-Ireland final 2 September
Kilkenny	3–06
Tipperary	5–06

=== All-Ireland semi-finals ===
29 July 1945 Semi-final	Kilkenny	5–03 – 2–11	Galway	St. Brendan's Park

5 August 1945 Semi-final	Tipperary	5–09 – 1–06	Antrim	Croke Park

=== All-Ireland Final ===
2 September 1945 Final	Tipperary	5–06 – 3–06	Kilkenny	Croke Park
				Attendance: 69,456; Referee: V Baston (Waterford)

== Sources ==
- Corry, Eoghan, The GAA Book of Lists (Hodder Headline Ireland, 2005).
- Donegan, Des, The Complete Handbook of Gaelic Games (DBA Publications Limited, 2005).
