= Borris–Ileigh GAA =

Gaelic sports club in County Tipperary, Ireland

Borris–Ileigh
- CLG Buíreas Uí Luíoch
- Founded: 1886
- County: Tipperary
- Colours: Maroon and White
- Grounds: Bishop Quinlan Park, Borrisoleigh
- Coordinates: 52°44′58.93″N 7°57′10.14″W

Playing kits
Standard colours

Senior Club Championships
	All Ireland	Munster champions	Tipperary champions
Hurling:	1	2	7

Borris–Ileigh Gaelic Athletic Club (Irish: CLG Buíreas Uí Luíoch) is a Gaelic games club that is based in the village of Borrisoleigh, County Tipperary, Ireland. The club currently plays hurling and camogie in the county-wide and North division competitions of Tipperary GAA. It formerly participated in Mid Tipperary divisional competitions. It also plays Gaelic football at Junior and under-age levels. The club attracts members from the civil parish of Glenkeen which is co-extensive with the Catholic parish of Borrisoleigh and Ileigh.

== History ==
"Borrisoleigh Gaelic Athletic Club" was founded in 1886. In 1948, this club merged with "Ileigh Hurling Club".

== Hurling ==
Borrisoleigh reached the semifinal of the first Tipperary Senior Hurling Championship in 1887, a year after its foundation. In 1910 the club won the Tipperary Junior Hurling Championship, defeating Toomevara. The Borris and Ileigh clubs competed separately in the Mid and North divisions, and in 1947 Borrisoleigh defeated Kilruane to win the North Senior Hurling Championship, but lost in the county final.

The united Borris–Ileigh club won the Mid Senior final in 1949, beating Boerlahan, and went on to win the county title, beating Knockavilla–Donaskeigh by 4–6 to 2–1. They held the title in 1950, defeating Carrick Swans 2–7 to 2–3. A third county title came in 1953, when they beat Boherlahan 4–8 to 4–4. After a lean period in the 1960s and '70s Borris–Ileigh won three county SHC titles in the 1980s, along with the 1986 Munster and 1987 All-Ireland titles.

On 3 November 2019, Borris–Ileigh won their first Tipperary Championship since 1986 with a 1–15 to 1–12 win over Kiladangan in the final. On 24 November 2019, Borris-Ileigh won their second Munster Club Hurling Championship after a 1–12 to 1–11 win against Ballygunner in the final. On 5 January 2020, Borris–Ileigh reached the 2020 All-Ireland Senior Club Hurling Championship Final after a 1–21 to 1–14 win against St Thomas in the semi-finals. In the final on 19 January, Borris–Ileigh lost to Ballyhale Shamrocks by 0–18 to 0–15.

=== Honours ===
- All-Ireland Senior Club Hurling Championship (1)
  - 1987
    - runners-up 2020
- Tipperary Senior Hurling Championship (7)
  - 1949, 1950, 1953, 1981, 1983, 1986, 2019
    - runners-up 1947, 2017
- Munster Senior Club Hurling Championship (2)
  - 1986, 2019
  - *** runners-up 1983
- North Tipperary Senior Hurling Championship (15)
  - (Borrisoleigh) 1947
  - 1950, 1951, 1952, 1953, 1955, 1972, 1973, 1976, 1981, 1983, 1988, 2005, 2007, 2017
- Mid Tipperary Senior Hurling Championship (1)
  - 1949
- Tipperary Junior A Hurling Championship (2)
  - (Borrisoleigh) 1910, 1933
- North Tipperary Junior A Hurling Championship (1)
  - 1978
- North Tipperary Junior A Football Championship (7)
  - 1960, 1991, 1994, 1996, 2001, 2004, 2008
- Mid Tipperary Junior Hurling 'A' Championship (3)
  - (Borrisoleigh) 1910, 1926, 1928
- Tipperary Under-21 (A) Hurling Championship (3)
  - 1969, 1987, 1997
- North Tipperary U-21 (A) Hurling Championship (8)
  - 1969, 1987, 1988, 1997, 2022, 2024, 2025, 2026
- Tipperary U-21 (B) Hurling Championship (1)
  - 1995
- North Tipperary U-21 (B) Hurling Championship (2)
  - 1995, 2015
- Tipperary Minor (B) Hurling Championship (1)
  - 1985
- North Tipperary Minor (B) Hurling Championship (3)
  - 1981, 1985, 2004
- All Ireland 7-a-Side Championship (6)
  - 1976, 1978, 1987, 1997, 2000, 2015

=== Notable players ===
- Mick Cowan
- Jim Devaney
- Liam Devaney, Hurler of the Year 1961
- Jimmy Finn, captain of All Ireland winning Tipperary Senior Hurling team, 1951
- Pat Kavanagh (Kilkenny hurler)
- Conor Kenny (hurler) (Kildare)
- Paddy Kenny, captain of All Ireland winning Tipperary Minor Hurling team, 1947
- Sean Kenny, captain of All Ireland winning Tipperary Senior Hurling team, 1950
- Dan McCormack
- Paddy McCormack
- Brendan Maher, captain of All Ireland winning Tipperary Minor Hurling team, 2007, All Star, Young Hurler of the Year 2010, captain of All Ireland winning Tipperary Senior Hurling team, 2016
- Philip Maher, All Star
- Noel O'Dwyer
- Tommy O'Dwyer
- Jim Prior (hurler) (Dublin)
- Aidan Ryan, All Star
- Mick Ryan (Borris–Ileigh hurler)
- Bobby Ryan, captain of All Ireland winning Tipperary Senior Hurling team, 1989, All Star
- Ned Ryan
- Pat Ryan (Borris–Ileigh hurler)
- Philly Ryan
- Tim Ryan
- Conor Stakelum
- Richard Stakelum, captain of Munster Senior Championship winning Tipperary Hurling team, 1987 (the end of sixteen barren years for the county)
- Gerry Stapleton
- Paddy Stapleton
- Timmy Stapleton

Notably coaches

- Paddy Doyle (hurler), did not play for Borris–Ileigh but coached them to the 1987 All-Ireland Senior Cub Hurling Championship

== Gaelic football ==
Borrisoleigh won the Mid Tipperary Senior Football Championship in 1910, defeating Upperchurch. The Borris-Ileigh club, in which hurling dominates, currently plays in the Junior championship and leagues.

=== Honours ===
- Mid Tipperary Senior Football Championship (1)
  - (Borrisoleigh) 1910
- North Tipperary Junior 'A' Football Championship (7)
  - 1960, 1991, 1994, 1996, 2001, 2004, 2008
- North Tipperary U-21 (A) Football Championship (1)
  - 1998
- North Tipperary U-21 (B) Football Championship (2)
  - 1994, 1995
- North Tipperary Minor (B) Football Championship (5)
  - 1993, 1996, 2000, 2006, 2009

== Camogie ==
The Borris–Ileigh Camogie Club competes at Senior level and also fields Minor, Under-16, U-14, U-12 and U-8 teams.

== Culture ==
The club also participates in Scór competitions.

== Facilities ==
The club is planning to develop a community sports complex at its home grounds, which were extended with the purchase of adjoining land in 2012.
