= Séamus Bannon =

Irish hurler

Personal information
- Native name: Séamus Ó Banáin (Irish)
- Born: 1927 The Ragg, County Tipperary, Ireland
- Died: 27 February 1990 (aged 62) Swansea, Wales
- Height: 5 ft 11 in (180 cm)

Sport
- Sport: Hurling
- Position: Left corner-forward
Clubs
- Years: Club
- Drom-Inch; Nenagh Éire Óg; Young Irelands
Club titles
- Tipperary titles: 0
Inter-county
- Years: County
- 1949-1956: Tipperary
Inter-county titles
- Munster titles: 3
- All-Irelands: 3
- NHL: 4

Séamus Bannon (1927 – 27 February 1990) was an Irish sportsman. He played hurling at various with his local clubs Nenagh Éire Óg in Tipperary and Young Irelands in Dublin and was a member of the Tipperary senior inter-county team in the 1940s and 1950s. Bannon won three All-Ireland and three Munster titles with Tipperary.

He was the father of association football player Paul Bannon.
