= 1946–47 National Hurling League =

16th season of the National Hurling League

League details
- Dates: 20 October 1946 – April 1947

League champions
- Winners: Limerick (6th win)

The 1946–47 National Hurling League was the 16th season of the NHL, an annual hurling competition for the GAA county teams. Limerick won the league, beating Kilkenny by 3–8 to 1–7 in a replay of the final.

== National Hurling League ==
=== Knock-out stage ===
Semi-finals

Semi-final	Limerick	5-6 - 4-4	Laois

Semi-final	Kilkenny	3-12 - 2-6	Tipperary

Finals

Final	Limerick	4-5 - 2-11	Kilkenny

Final replay	Limerick	3-8 - 1-7	Kilkenny
