= 1951 All-Ireland Senior Hurling Championship =

Championship details
- Dates: 6 May – 2 September 1951
- Teams: 13

All-Ireland champions
- Winning team: Tipperary (16th win)
- Captain: Jimmy Finn

All-Ireland Finalists
- Losing team: Wexford
- Captain: Nicky Rackard

Provincial champions
- Munster: Tipperary
- Leinster: Wexford
- Ulster: Not Played
- Connacht: Not Played

Championship statistics
- No. matches played: 13
- Goals total: 78 (6.0 per game)
- Points total: 201 (15.4 per game)
- Top Scorer: Nicky Rackard (9–18)
- All-Star Team: See here

The 1951 All-Ireland Senior Hurling Championship was the 65th staging of the All-Ireland hurling championship since its establishment by the Gaelic Athletic Association in 1887. The championship began on 6 May 1951 and ended on 2 September 1951.

Tipperary were the defending champions, and retained their All-Ireland crown following a 7–7 to 3–9 defeat of Wexford.

== Teams ==
=== Team summaries ===
Team	Colours	Most recent success		
Team	Colours	All-Ireland	Provincial	League
Clare	Saffron and blue	1914	1932	1945–46
Cork	Red and white	1946	1947	1947–48
Dublin	Navy and blue	1938	1948	1938–39
Galway	Maroon and white	1923	1922	1950–51
Kilkenny	Black and amber	1947	1950	1932–33
Laois	Blue and white	1915	1949	
Limerick	Green and white	1940	1940	1946–47
Meath	Green and gold			
Offaly	Green, white and gold			
Tipperary	Blue and gold	1950	1950	1949–50
Waterford	Blue and white	1948	1948	
Westmeath	Maroon and white			
Wexford	Purple and gold	1910	1918	

== Provincial championships ==
=== Leinster Senior Hurling Championship ===
First round

6 May 1951 First round	Laois	5–01 – 2–02	Offaly	O'Moore Park, Portlaoise
	P Kelly 3–0, W Dargan 1–0, P Lalor 1–0, H Gray 0–1.		M Ryan 2–0, Walsh 0–1, Mulrooney 0–1.	Referee: JJ Stuart (Dublin)

6 May 1951 First round	Westmeath	0–06 – 6–10	Dublin	Cusack Park, Mullingar
	Daly 0–2, Aylward 0–2, Walsh 0–1, Kelleghan 0–1.		Melee goals 3–0, Cashin 2–0, J Finnan 1–1, O'Neill 0–5, Kelly 0–2, N Allen 0–1, J Prior 0–1.	Referee: T Donnelly

6 May 1951 First round	Meath	2–07 – 2–07	Wexford	St. Loman's Park, Trim
	M Keogh 1–3, B Smyth 1–1, L Wright 0–2, M O'Brien 0–1.		N Rackard 1–0, Slater 1–0, Padge Kehoe 0–3, T Flood 0–3, R Rackard 0–1.	Referee: G Rosengrave

20 May 1951 First round replay	Wexford	3–10 – 0–02	Meath	Enniscorthy
	N Rackard 1–5, Padge Kehoe 1–2, J Cummins 1–0, B Rackard 0–2, M Flood 0–1.		B Smyth 0–1, P Kelly 0–1.	Attendance: 4,000; Referee: P Grace (Kilkenny)

Semi-finals

10 June 1951 Semi-final	Laois	5–10 – 2–07	Kilkenny	O'Moore Park, Portlaoise
	P Kelly 3–1, H Gray 2–4, P Lalor 0–2, J Styles 0–1, W Dargan 0–1, J Maher 0–1.		J O'Neill 1–0, D Kennedy 1–0, J Langton 0–3, S Downey 0–2, P Lennon 0–1, W Walsh 0–1.	Referee: E Long (Carlow)

17 June 1951 Semi-final	Dublin	4–06 – 6–09	Wexford	Nowlan Park, Kilkenny
	J Finnan 2–0, S O'Neill 1–1, M Williams 1–0, P Donnelly 0–2, J Prior 0–1, N Allen 0–1, D Dillon 0–1.		N Rackard 2–4, Paddy Kehoe 2–0, Padge Kehoe 1–2, D Ahearne 1–0, J Cummins 0–1, T Flood 0–1, J Morrissey 0–1.	Attendance: 17,410; Referee: J Phelan (Kilkenny)

Final

15 July 1951 Final	Wexford	3–12 – 4–03	Laois	Croke Park, Dublin
	N Rackard 1–4, J Cummins 2–0, T Russell 0–3, S Thorpe 0–1, N Wheeler 0–1, Padge Kehoe 0–2, T Flood 0–1.		H Gray 3–1, P Lalor 1–0, W Bohane 0–1, W Dargan 0–1.	Attendance: 26,692; Referee: E Long (Carlow)

=== Munster Senior Hurling Championship ===
First round

10 June 1951 First round	Tipperary	2–10 – 1–10	Waterford	Cork Athletic Grounds, Cork
	J Kennedy 1–3, S Kenny 1–0, B Stakelum 0–3, M Ryan 0–2, S Bannon 0–2.		J Kiely 1–1, J Fives 0–3, M Fives 0–3, J Keane 0–1, M O'Connor 0–1, M Flannelly 0–1.	Attendance: 18,100; Referee: C Murphy (Cork)

Semi-finals

1 July 1951 Semi-final	Cork	5–07 – 3–05	Clare	Gaelic Grounds, Limerick
	S Condon 2–0, J Lynam 1–1, C Ring 0–4, S O'Brien 1–0, WJ Daly 1–0, M Fouhy 0–1, T Aherne 0–1.		J Smyth 3–1, Considine 0–3, M Nugent 0–1.	Attendance: 25,000; Referee: W O'Donoghue (Limerick)

8 July 1951 Semi-final	Tipperary	3–08 – 1–06	Limerick	Thurles Sportsfield, Thurles
	T Ryan 1–1, M Ryan 1–1, S Bannon 1–1, P Stakelum 0–3, P Kenny 0–2.		M Ryan 1–0, D Stokes 0–1, T Murphy 0–1, D Kelly 0–1, T Long 0–1, T O'Brien 0–1, S Herbert 0–1.	Attendance: 30,633; Referee: C Murphy (Cork)

Final

31 July 1951 Final	Tipperary	2–11 – 2–09	Cork	Gaelic Grounds, Limerick
	P Kenny 0–6, M Maher 1–1, N Ryan 1–0, P Shanahan 0–2, S Bannon 0–1, P Stakelum 0–1.		C Ring 1–4, T Crotty 1–0, WJ Daly 0–2, J Lynam 0–1, S Condon 0–1, W Griffin 0–1.	Attendance: 42,337; Referee: J Sadlier (Limerick)

== All-Ireland Senior Hurling Championship ==
Semi-final

29 July 1951 Semi-final	Wexford	3–11 – 2–09	Galway	Croke Park, Dublin
	T Russell 1–5, N Rackard 1–3, Padge Kehoe 1–2, T Flood 0–1.		J Gallagher 0–4, M Glynn 1–0, Melee goal 1–0, J Molloy 0–2, J Salmon 0–2, K McNamee 0–1.	Attendance: 26,310; Referee: W O'Donoghue (Limerick)

Final

2 September 1951 Final	Tipperary	7–07 – 3–09	Wexford	Croke Park, Dublin
	P Kenny 0–7, S Bannon 2–0, T Ryan 2–0, N Ryan 1–0, M Ryan 1–0, M Maher 1–0.		N Rackard 3–2, T Russell 0–3, Padge Kehoe 0–2, Paddy Kehoe 0–1, N Wheeler 0–1.	Attendance: 68,515; Referee: W O'Donoghue (Limerick)

== Championship statistics ==
=== Top scorers ===
Top scorers overall

Rank	Player	Club	Tally	Total	Matches	Average
1	Nicky Rackard	Wexford	9–18	45	6	7.50
2	Padge Kehoe	Wexford	3–13	22	6	3.66
3	Harry Gray	Laois	5-06	21	3	7.00
4	Paddy Kelly	Laois	6-01	19	3	6.33
5	Paddy Kenny	Tipperary	1–15	18	4	4.50
6	Tim Russell	Wexford	1–11	14	3	4.66
7	Séamus Bannon	Tipperary	3-04	13	4	3.25
8	Christy Ring	Wexford	1-08	11	2	5.50
9	Jack Cummins	Wexford	3-01	10	6	1.66
9	Jimmy Smyth	Clare	3-01	10	1	10.00
9	Jack Finnan	Dublin	3-01	10	2	5.00
9	Tim Ryan	Tipperary	3-01	10	4	2.50

Top scorers in a single game

Rank	Player	Club	Tally	Total	Opposition
1	Nicky Rackard	Wexford	3-02	11	Tipperary
2	Paddy Kelly	Laois	3-01	10	Kilkenny
2	Harry Gray	Laois	3-01	10	Wexford
2	Jimmy Smyth	Clare	3-01	10	Cork
2	Harry Gray	Laois	2-04	10	Kilkenny
2	Nicky Rackard	Wexford	2-04	10	Dublin
3	Paddy Kelly	Laois	3-00	9	Offaly
4	Nicky Rackard	Wexford	1-05	8	Meath
4	Tim Russell	Wexford	1-05	8	Galway
5	Nicky Rackard	Wexford	1-04	7	Laois
5	Christy Ring	Cork	1-04	7	Tipperary
5	Paddy Kenny	Tipperary	0-07	7	Wexford

=== Scoring ===
- Widest winning margin: 22 points
  - Dublin 6–10 – 0–6 Westmeath (Leinster quarter-final, 6 May 1951)
- Most goals in a match: 10
  - Tipperary 7–7 – 3–9 Wexford (All-Ireland final, 2 September 1951)
- Most points in a match: 20
  - Tipperary 2–10 – 1–10 Waterford (Munster quarter-final, 10 June 1951)
  - Tipperary 2–11 – 2–9 Cork (Munster final, 30 July 1951)
  - Wexford 3–11 – 2–9 Galway (All-Ireland semi-final, 30 July 1951)
- Most goals by one team in a match: 7
  - Tipperary 7–7 – 3–9 Wexford (All-Ireland final, 2 September 1951)
- Most goals scored by a losing team: 4
  - Dublin 4–6 – 6–9 Wexford (Leinster semi-final, 17 June 1951)
  - Laois 4–3 – 3–12 Wexford (Leinster final, 15 July 1951)
- Most points scored by a losing team: 10
  - Waterford 1–10 – 2–10 Tipperary (Munster quarter-final, 10 June 1951)

=== Miscellaneous ===
- Wexford win their first Leinster title since 1918. The team also qualify for their first All-Ireland decider since then.
- A colour clash between Wexford and Tipperary in the All-Ireland final resulted in both sides wearing their provincial colours. Tipperary wore the blue of Munster while Wexford wore the green of Leinster.
- Tipperary win its 16th All-Ireland title and join Cork as joint leaders on the all-time roll of honour.

== Sources ==
- Corry, Eoghan, The GAA Book of Lists (Hodder Headline Ireland, 2005).
- Donegan, Des, The Complete Handbook of Gaelic Games (DBA Publications Limited, 2005).
- Sweeney, Éamonn, Munster Hurling Legends (The O'Brien Press, 2002).
