= 1950 All-Ireland Senior Hurling Championship =

Championship details
- Dates: 30 April – 3 September 1950
- Teams: 13

All-Ireland champions
- Winning team: Tipperary (15th win)
- Captain: Seán Kenny

All-Ireland Finalists
- Losing team: Kilkenny
- Captain: Mick Kenny

Provincial champions
- Munster: Tipperary
- Leinster: Kilkenny
- Ulster: Not Played
- Connacht: Not Played

Championship statistics
- No. matches played: 12
- Goals total: 55 (4.5 per game)
- Points total: 177 (14.75 per game)
- Top Scorer: Jimmy Kennedy (4–23)
- All-Star Team: See here

The 1950 All-Ireland Senior Hurling Championship was the 64th staging of the All-Ireland hurling championship since its establishment by the Gaelic Athletic Association in 1887. The championship began on 30 April 1950 and ended on 3 September 1950.

Tipperary were the defending champions, and retained their All-Ireland crown following a 1–9 to 1–8 defeat of Kilkenny.

== Team changes ==
=== To championship ===
Promoted from the All-Ireland Junior Hurling Championship

- None

=== From championship ===
Relegated to the All-Ireland Junior Hurling Championship

- Antrim

== Teams ==
=== Team summaries ===
Team	Colours	Most recent success		
Team	Colours	All-Ireland	Provincial	League
Clare	Saffron and blue	1914	1932	1945–46
Cork	Red and white	1946	1947	1947–48
Dublin	Navy and blue	1938	1948	1938–39
Galway	Maroon and white	1923	1922	1930–31
Kilkenny	Black and amber	1947	1947	1932–33
Laois	Blue and white	1915	1949	
Limerick	Green and white	1940	1940	1946–47
Meath	Green and gold			
Offaly	Green, white and gold			
Tipperary	Blue and gold	1949	1949	1949–50
Waterford	Blue and white	1948	1948	
Westmeath	Maroon and white			
Wexford	Purple and gold	1910	1918	

== Provincial championships ==
=== Leinster Senior Hurling Championship ===
First round

30 April 1950 First round	Wexford	3–09 – 0–01	Meath	Enniscorthy
	Padge Kehoe 1–2, M Flood 1–1, Lenihan 1–1, T Russell 0–4, T Flood 0–1.		A Foran 0–1.

30 April 1950 First round	Offaly	3–03 – 3–02	Westmeath	St. Brendan's Park, Birr
	W Nevin 1–2, T Sheerin 1–0, M Ryan 1–0, Errity 0–1,		J McGrath 2–2, P Gaffney 1–0.

Quarter-final

21 May 1950 Quarter-final	Wexford	4–09 – 1–03	Offaly	Nowlan Park, Kilkenny
	N Rackard 2–5, T Flood 1–0, Padge Kehoe 1–0, R Donovan 0–1, P Kehoe 0–1, B Rackard 0–1, J Morrissey 0–1.		Mitchell 1–2, Nevin 0–1.

Semi-finals

11 June 1950 Semi-final	Laois	1–06 – 7–02	Wexford	Nowlan Park, Kilkenny
	J Styles 0–4, P Kelly 1–0, B Bohane 0–1, H Gray 0–1.		T Flood 3–0, R Donovan 2–0, D Ahearne 1–0, N Rackard 1–0, T Russell 0–2.	Attendance: 11,937; Referee: PJ Flaherty (Offaly)

18 June 1950 Semi-final	Dublin	1–07 – 4–10	Kilkenny	Wexford Park, Wexford
	F Cummins 1–1, G Kelly 0–2, A Herbert 0–1, J Prior 0–1, D Dillon 0–1, M Lyons 0–1.		J Langton 1–2, M Kenny 1–0, P Grace 1–0, M Kenny 1–0, J Heffernan 0–2, W Costigan 0–2, L Reidy 0–2, W Walsh 0–1, S Downey 0–1.	Attendance: 12,000; Referee: E Long (Carlow)

Final

16 July 1950 Final	Kilkenny	3–11 – 2–11	Wexford	Nowlan Park, Kilkenny
	J Heffernan 1–2, J Langton 1–4, L Reidy 1–1, S Downey 0–2, W Walsh 0–1, J Gargan 0–1.		N Rackard 2–2, Padge Kehoe 0–4, J Morrissey 0–2, T Flood 0–2, T Russell 0–1.	Attendance: 36,000; Referee: S Conroy (Laois)

=== Munster Senior Hurling Championship ===
Quarter-final

18 June 1950 Quarter-final	Limerick	0–08 – 4–08	Tipperary	Gaelic Grounds, Limerick
	S O'Grady 0–4, Barry 0–1, D Stokes 0–1, D McCarthy 0–1, G Fitzgerald 0–1.		J Kennedy 3–6, M Ryan 1–0, S Maher 0–1, P Stakelum 0–1.	Attendance: 21,000; Referee: C Murphy (Cork)

Semi-finals

25 June 1950 Semi-final	Cork	1–04 – 0–05	Waterford	Thurles Sportsfield, Thurles
	Crotty 1–0, C Ring 0–2, WJ Daly 0–2, P Healy 0–1.		M Heffernan 0–1, M Flannelly 0–1, J Keane 0–1, V Baston 0–1.	Attendance: 28,300; Referee: W O'Donoghue (Limerick)

9 July 1950 Semi-final	Tipperary	2–13 – 3–07	Clare	Gaelic Grounds, Limerick
	J Kennedy 1–3, P Kenny 1–1, M Ryan 0–3, N Ryan 0–3, S Kenny 0–2, J Ryan 0–1.		J Smyth 2–3, O'Brien 1–0, Daly 0–2, Daly 0–1, McMahon 0–1.

Final

23 July 1950 Final	Tipperary	2–17 – 3–11	Cork	FitzGerald Stadium, Killarney
	J Kennedy 0–10, P Kenny 2–2, T Ryan 0–2, M Ryan 0–2, S Bannon 0–1.		C Ring 1–4, J Lynch 1–2, M Fouhy 1–0, S Condon 0–3, J Daly 0–2.	Referee: W O'Donoghue (Limerick)

== All-Ireland Senior Hurling Championship ==
=== All-Ireland semi-finals ===
13 August 1950 Semi-final	Galway	2–06 – 4–07	Tipperary	Tuam Stadium, Tuam
	J Gallagher 0–5, M McInerney 1–0, K McNamee 1–0, T Moroney 0–1.		P Kenny 2–1, N Ryan 1–1, P Shanahan 1–0, M Ryan 0–2, J Kennedy 0–2, S Kenny 0–1.	Attendance: 25,000; Referee: W O'Donoghue (Limerick)

=== All-Ireland Final ===
3 September 1950 Final	Tipperary	1–09 – 1–08	Kilkenny	Croke Park, Dublin
	P Kenny 1–2, J Kennedy 0–2, S Kenny 0–2, S Bannon 0–2, M Ryan 0–1.		J Langton 0–6, J Kelly 1–0, J Heffernan 0–1, D Kennedy 0–1.	Attendance: 67,629; Referee: C Murphy (Cork)

== Championship statistics ==
=== Top scorers ===
Overall

Rank	Player	County	Tally	Total	Matches	Average
1	Jimmy Kennedy	Tipperary	4–23	35	5	7.00
2	Paddy Kenny	Tipperary	6-06	24	5	4.80
3	Nicky Rackard	Wexford	5-07	22	3	7.33
4	Jim Langton	Kilkenny	2–12	18	3	6.00
5	Tim Flood	Wexford	4-03	15	4	3.75
6	Padge Kehoe	Wexford	2-06	12	3	4.00
7	Mick Ryan	Tipperary	1-08	11	5	2.20
8	Jimmy Smyth	Clare	2-03	9	1	9.00
8	Christy Ring	Cork	1-06	9	2	4.50
9	John McGrath	Westmeath	2-02	8	1	8.00
9	Jimmy Heffernan	Kilkenny	1-08	8	3	2.66

In a single game

Rank	Player	County	Tally	Total	Opposition
1	Jimmy Kennedy	Tipperary	3-06	15	Limerick
2	Nicky Rackard	Wexford	2-05	11	Offaly
3	Jimmy Kennedy	Tipperary	0–10	10	Cork
4	Tim Flood	Wexford	3-00	9	Laois
4	Jimmy Smyth	Clare	2-03	9	Tipperary
5	Nicky Rackard	Wexford	2-02	8	Kilkenny
5	John McGrath	Westmeath	2-02	8	Offaly
5	Paddy Kenny	Tipperary	2-02	8	Cork
6	Paddy Kenny	Tipperary	2-01	7	Galway
6	Jim Langton	Kilkenny	1-04	7	Wexford
6	Christy Ring	Cork	1-04	7	Tipperary

=== Scoring ===
- Widest winning margin: 17 points
  - Wexford 3–9 – 0–1 Meath (Leinster first round, 30 April 1950)
- Most goals in a match: 8
  - Laois 1–6 – 7–2 Wexford (Leinster semi-final, 11 June 1950)
- Most points in a match: 29
  - Tipperary 2–17 – 3–11 Cork (Munster final, 23 July 1950)
- Most goals by one team in a match: 7
  - Wexford 7–2 – 1–6 Laois (Leinster semi-final, 11 June 1950)
- Most goals scored by a losing team: 3
  - Westmeath 3–2 – 3–3 Offaly (Leinster first round, 30 April 1950)
  - Clare 3–7 – 2–13 Tipperary (Munster semi-final, 9 July 1950)
  - Cork 3–11 – 2–17 Tipperary (Munster final, 23 July 1950)
- Most points scored by a losing team: 11
  - Wexford 2–11 – 3–11 Kilkenny (Leinster final, 16 July 1950)
  - Cork 3–11 – 2–17 Tipperary (Munster final, 23 July 1950)

== Miscellaneous ==
- For the first time since 1942 there were no representatives from Ulster in the All-Ireland series.

== See also ==
- 1950 All-Ireland Junior Hurling Championship

== Sources ==
- Corry, Eoghan, The GAA Book of Lists (Hodder Headline Ireland, 2005).
- Donegan, Des, The Complete Handbook of Gaelic Games (DBA Publications Limited, 2005).
- Sweeney, Éamonn, Munster Hurling Legends (The O'Brien Press, 2002).
