= List of National Hurling League winning teams =

National Hurling League champions mean those that won the highest league in hurling in Ireland.

== National Hurling League-winning teams ==
Year	Champions (number of titles)	Team
1925-26	Cork (1)	1926: J. Coughlan, Maurice Murphy, S. Murphy, Mick Murphy, D. Barry Murphy, J. O'Regan, E. O'Connell, J. Hurley, W. Higgins, Matt Murphy, P. Ahern, E. Coughlan, D. Ahern, M. Ahern, T. O'Brien.
1926-27		
1927-28	Tipperary (1)	
1928-29	Dublin (1)	
1929-30	Cork (2)	
1930-31	Galway (1)	
1931-32		
1932-33	Kilkenny (1)	
1933-34	Limerick (1)	
1934-35	Limerick (2)	
1935-36	Limerick (3)	
1936-37	Limerick (4)	
1937-38	Limerick (5)	
1938-39	Dublin (2)	
1939-40	Cork (3)	
1940-41	Cork (4)	
1945-46	Clare (1)	
1946-47	Limerick (6)	
1947-48	Cork (5)	
1948-49	Tipperary (2)	
1949-50	Tipperary (3)	
1950-51	Galway (2)	
1951-52	Tipperary (4)	
1952-53	Cork (6)	
1953-54	Tipperary (5)	
1954-55	Tipperary (6)	
1955-56	Wexford (1)	
1956-57	Tipperary (7)	
1957-58	Wexford (2)	
1958-59	Tipperary (8)	
1959-60	Tipperary (9)	
1960-61	Tipperary (10)	
1961-62	Kilkenny (2)	
1962-63	Waterford (1)	
1968-69	Cork (7)	
1969-70	Cork (8)	
1971-72	Cork (9)	
1973-74	Cork (10)	
1979-80	Cork (11)	
1980-81	Cork (12)	
1992-93	Cork (13)	
1998	Cork (14)	
2012	Dublin (3)	G Maguire; N Cocoran, T Brady, P Kelly; J McCaffrey, J Boland, S Durkin; A McCrabbe, L Rushe; C Keaney, R O’Dwyer, C McCormack; D Plunkett, D O’Callaghan. P Ryan. Subs: M O’Brien, D O’Dywer, D Treacy, S Lambert, S Ryan.
2012	Kilkenny (15)	D Herity; P Murphy, JJ Delaney, J Tyrrell; T Walsh, B Hogan, R Doyle; M Fennelly, P Hogan; R Hogan, TJ Reid, C Buckley; C Fennelly, E Larkin, M Ruth. Subs: J Mulhall, M Bergin.
2013	Kilkenny (16)	Eoin Murphy, Paul Murphy, J. J. Delaney, Jackie Tyrrell, Tommy Walsh, Brian Hogan, Kieran Joyce, Lester Ryan, Michael Fennelly, Cillian Buckley, Michael Rice, Eoin Larkin, Colin Fennelly, Richie Hogan, Aidan Fogarty. Sub: Matthew Ruth.
2014	Kilkenny (17)	Eoin Murphy, Paul Murphy, Joey Holden, Shane Prendergast, Pádraig Walsh, Robert Lennon, Diarmuid Cody, Lester Ryan, Conor Fogarty, Colin Fennelly, T. J. Reid, James Maher, Walter Walsh, Kevin Kelly, John Power. Subs: Kieran Joyce, Jonjo Farrell.
2015	Waterford (3)	Stephen O'Keeffe, Noel Connors, Barry Coughlan, Shane Fives, Austin Gleeson, Tadhg de Búrca, Philip Mahony, Jamie Barron, Kevin Moran, Colin Dunford, Pauric Mahony, Michael Walsh, Jake Dillon, Maurice Shanahan, Stephen Bennett. Subs: Brian O'Halloran, Tom Devine, Shane O'Sullivan, Martin O'Neill, Gavin O'Brien.
2016	Clare (4)	Patrick Kelly, Cian Dillon, Patrick O'Connor, David Fitzgerald, Jack Browne, Conor Cleary, Brendan Bugler, David Reidy, Colm Galvin, Tony Kelly, Conor McGrath, Podge Collins, Darach Honan, Aaron Cunningham, Shane O'Donnell. Subs: Colin Ryan, Cathal O'Connel, Aron Shanagher.
2017	Galway (10)	
2018	Kilkenny (18)	
2019	Limerick (12)	
2020	Limerick (13)	
2021	Galway (11) & Kilkenny (19)	
2022	Waterford (2)	
