= Phil Shanahan =

Irish hurler

Personal information
- Native name: Pilib Ó Seanacháin (Irish)
- Born: January 1928 Toomevara, County Tipperary, Ireland
- Died: 5 February 2012 (aged 84) Clonmel, County Tipperary, Ireland
- Occupation: Esso employee

Sport
- Sport: Hurling
- Position: Midfield
Clubs
- Years: Club
- 1945–1949 1950–1956 1957–1966: Toomevara; Young Irelands; Toomevara
Club titles
- Tipperary titles: 1
Inter-county
- Years: County
- 1949–1953 1954–1955 1957: Tipperary; Dublin; Tipperary
Inter-county titles
- Munster titles: 3
- Leinster titles: 0
- All-Irelands: 3
- NHL: 3

Phil Shanahan (4 January 1928 – 5 February 2012) was an Irish hurler who played as a midfielder for the Tipperary and Dublin senior teams.

Shanahan made his first appearance for the Tipperary team during the 1946 championship and became a regular member of the team over the next decade. During that time he won three All-Ireland winners' medals, three Munster winners' medals and three National League winners' medals. In 1955 and 1956 Shanahan played with the Dublin senior team, however, he returned to Tipperary before his retirement from the inter-county scene after the 1957 championship.

At club level Shanahan is a county championship winners' medalist with the Toomevara club in Tipperary. He also played with the Young Irelands club in Dublin.

== Playing career ==
=== Club ===
Shanahan showed early promise making his debut at senior level with Toomevara in the 1945 championship, while still only seventeen years of age. The club were back in the senior ranks for the first time since 1938, when they failed to field a team in the first round of the senior championship.

In 1946 Shanahan won his first divisional medal when Toomevara defeated Roscrea in the north final, their first such victory since 1931.

A move to Dublin in 1950 saw him join the Young Irelands club, however, he enjoyed little success with the Dublin club before moving back to Tipperary in the late fifties.

Shanahan played in seven consecutive North Tipperary finals from 1957 to 1963, winning four in 1958, 1960, 1961 and 1962. He captained the team in 1958. There were also three county final appearances, with defeats in 1958 and 1961, and a great victory over Thurles Sarsfields in 1960, a victory that prevented the Thurles club winning six in-a-row.

Shanahan eventually retired from club hurling in 1966 after a career of twenty years.

=== Inter-county ===
Shanahan made his inter-county debut with the Tipperary minor hurling team in 1946. In the Munster final against Cork he collected a mis-hit seventy-yard free near the end of the game to score the winning goal and win the match by just a single point. Galway were well-beaten in the All-Ireland semi-final but the final was lost to Dublin in the infamous Billy O'Brien goalmouth incident. In the last few minutes the Dublin forwards succeeded in getting the ball over the goal line for a goal, which was only awarded after a three-minute consultation between the referee M. J. Flaherty and the umpires. Both umpires claimed that the goalie, Billy O'Brien, had been fouled before the goal was scored but the referee didn't see the foul and allowed the goal. Dublin won by 1–6 to 0–7.

Shanahan's first entry into the senior ranks was when he was selected at midfield for Tipperary's 1948–49 National League campaign. Tipperary qualified for the final against Cork and won by 3–5 to 3–3. It was their first victory in the competition since 1928. Shanahan enjoyed further success later that year when Tipp defeated Limerick by 1–16 to 2–10 to take the Munster title. He subsequently lined out in his first All-Ireland final at senior level. Surprisingly, Laois were the opponents on that occasion, however, the result was expected. Tipp opened the floodgates with a Paddy Kenny goal before Jimmy Kennedy added two more goals in the second-half. At the full-time whistle Tipp were the victors by 3–11 to 0–3 and Shanahan had captured an All-Ireland winners' medal. He finished off the year by winning his first Oireachtas title.

In spite of a move to Dublin 1950, Shanahan added a second National League winners' medal to his collection before further provincial glory followed. A 2–17 to 3–11 defeat of Cork gave him a second consecutive Munster medal and an easy passage into another All-Ireland final. Kilkenny provided the opposition on that occasion in a close but uninteresting game. At the final whistle Tipp emerged the victors by 1–9 to 1–8 giving Shanahan a second All-Ireland medal.

In 1951 Shanhan captured a third successive Munster title following a 2–11 to 2–9 defeat of arch-rivals Cork. This victory resulted in Tipp being installed as the favourites for a third consecutive All-Ireland title. Wexford, however, stood in Tipp's way after making a long-awaited breakthrough in Leinster. Nicky Rackard had been Wexford's star goal-poacher throughout the year, however, his artistry was beaten by Tony Reddin in the Tipperary goal-mouth. Séamus Bannon, Tim Ryan and Paddy Kenny got the goals in the second quarter that did the damage, however, Tipp forged ahead to win by 7–7 to 3–9.

For the next two years Tipperary were defeated by Cork in the Munster championship. It wasn't the end of his playing days, however, as he captured a third National League title in 1952.

Since Shanahan was now based in Dublin, he decided to line out for the Dubs in 1954. His two seasons at midfield resulted in Dublin being beaten by Wexford in the 1954 Leinster final and by Kilkenny in the 1955 Leinster semi-final.

In 1956 Shanahan lined out with Tipperary once again. He won a fourth National League medal as a non-playing substitute in 1957, however, Tipperary lost out to in the semi-final of the provincial championship. He retired from inter-county hurling following a tour to the United States at the end of the year.

== Coaching career ==
With his playing days over Shanahan turned his attention to training and coaching. His training career began with Portlaoise, where he helped the club to five championship football titles between 1966 and 1971. He attained a coaching certificate in hurling in 1977. When he retired from Esso in 1982 he trained and coached Killenaule to win three South Tipperary intermediate championships in hurling in 1983, 1985 and 1986.

== Personal life ==
Born in Toomevara, County Tipperary, Phil initially worked on the family farm. In 1950 he moved to Dublin where he found work with the Johnston Mooney and O'Brien bakery in Sundrive Road After six years here he moved to Clonmel where he worked with Esso Teoranta.

Phil married Joan Power in 1958 and the couple had three sons, Phil, David and Brian.

In his final years Shanahan's health deteriorated and he underwent open-heart surgery in 2008. He died on 5 February 2012.

== Honours ==
=== Team ===
Toomevara

- Tipperary Senior Club Hurling Championship (1): 1960
- North Tipperary Senior Club Hurling Championship (5): 1946, 1958, 1960, 1961, 1962

Tipperary

- All-Ireland Senior Hurling Championship (3): 1949, 1950, 1951
- Munster Senior Hurling Championship (3): 1949, 1950, 1951
- National Hurling League (3): 1948–49, 1949–50, 1951–52
- Oireachtas Tournament (1): 1949
- Thomond Feis (2): 1949, 1951
- Munster Minor Hurling Championship (1): 1946

Munster

- Railway Cup (4): 1950, 1951, 1952, 1953

=== Individual ===
Awards

- Sports Star of the Week: 1952
- North Tipperary Hurling Team of the Millennium: 2000
- Tipperary Hall of Fame Award: 2004
