= Mick Morrissey =

Wexford and New York hurler (1933–1993)

Personal information
- Native name: Mícheál Ó Muireasa (Irish)
- Born: 6 June 1933 St. Mullin's, County Carlow, Ireland
- Died: 22 March 1993 (aged 59) New York City, United States
- Occupation: Draper

Sport
- Sport: Hurling
- Position: Left wing-back
Club
- Years: Club
- Geraldine O'Hanrahans
Inter-county*
Years	County	Apps (scores)
1955–1960 1963–1966	Wexford; New York	17 (0–0); 0 (0–0)
Inter-county titles
- Leinster titles: 3
- All-Irelands: 3
- NHL: 2
- *Inter County team apps and scores correct as of 15:17, 5 July 2014.

Mick Morrissey (6 June 1933 – 22 March 1993) was an Irish hurler from County Carlow who played as a left wing-back for the Wexford and New York senior teams.

Morrissey first arrived on the inter-county scene at the age of twenty three when he first linked up with the Wexford senior team. He made his senior debut in the 1954-55 National Hurling League. Morrissey went on to play a key part for Wexford during a golden age for the team, and won two All-Ireland medals, three Leinster medals and two National Hurling League medals.

Morrissey made 17 championship appearances for Wexford ending in the 1960 championship after which he emigrated to the United States. He spent a number of seasons playing with New York, then became involved in team management and coaching, serving as trainer of the New York team in the early 1970s.

== Family and early life ==
Morrissey grew up on a farm in Ballycrinnegan outside St. Mullin's, County Carlow. His five brothers, Pat, John, Eddie, Moling, and Luke hurled for St. Mullin's GAA, and the latter two for Carlow. Aged 18 Mick became an apprentice draper in New Ross, County Wexford, and soon joined the local Geraldine O'Hanrahan's hurling club.

== Playing career ==
=== Club ===
Morrissey played his club hurling with Geraldine O'Hanrahan's and enjoyed some success.

After losing the intermediate championship decider to Faythe Harriers in 1956, O'Hanrahan's bounced back to reach the final again in 1957. A 6-7 to 5-6 defeat of Shelmaliers gave Morrissey a championship medal.

=== Inter-county ===
Morrissey made his senior debut for Wexford during the 1954-55 National League and immediately became a regular member of the starting fifteen. He was a substitute for the team's opening championship games, before making his debut on 17 July 1955 in the drawn Leinster decider with Kilkenny. Wexford won the subsequent replay by 5-6 to 3-9, with Morrissey collecting his first Leinster medal following a 5-6 to 3-9 defeat of Kilkenny in a replay of the Leinster final. Galway, who had been given a bye to the final without ever playing a game, provided the opposition in the subsequent All-Ireland final on 4 September 1955. At half-time the men from the west led by 2-5 to 2-3 courtesy of two goals from eighteen-year-old schoolboy Paddy Egan. A goal by Tim Flood nine minutes from the end clinched a 3-13 to 2-8 victory and a first All-Ireland medal for Morrissey. It was Wexford's first All-Ireland triumph in forty-five years.

Morrissey added a National Hurling League medal to his collection in 1956 as Tipperary were bested by 5-9 to 2-14. The subsequent championship campaign saw Wexford reach the provincial final once again. A narrow 4-8 to 3-10 defeat of Kilkenny gave Morrissey his second Leinster medal. Galway fell heavily in the All-Ireland semi-final, allowing Wexford to advance to an All-Ireland final meeting with Cork on 23 September 1956. The game has gone down in history as one of the all-time classics as Christy Ring was bidding for a record ninth All-Ireland medal. The game turned on one important incident as the Wexford goalkeeper, Art Foley, made a miraculous save from a Ring shot and cleared the sliotar up the field to set up another attack. Nicky Rackard scored a crucial goal with two minutes to go giving Wexford a 2-14 to 2-8 victory.

Two years later in 1958 Morrissey added a second National League medal to his collection following a 5-7 to 4-8 defeat of Limerick.

In 1960 Wexford were back in the provincial decider. A narrow 3-10 to 2-11 defeat of Kilkenny gave Morrissey his third Leinster medal. The All-Ireland decider on 4 September 1960 saw red-hot favourites Tipperary provide the opposition. The game ended in remarkable circumstances as the crowd invaded the pitch with a minute to go, mistaking the referee’s whistle for the end of the game. When the crowd were finally moved off the pitch Tipperary continued playing with only twelve men. Goals by Padge Kehoe and Oliver "Hopper" McGrath gave Wexford a merited 2-15 to 0-11 victory. It was Morrissey's third All-Ireland medal. This victory brought the curtain down on Morrissey's inter-county career with Wexford.

After emigrating to the United States, Morrissey became a member of the New York senior team. As was customary at the time, the home National League champions played New York for the title. Morrissey lined out in four consecutive league deciders between 1963 and 1966, however, New York were beaten by Waterford, Tipperary (twice) and Kilkenny.

== Coaching career ==
After his retirement from playing, Morrissey became involved in team management and coaching. He trained the New York team that were narrowly defeated by Cork on an aggregate score of 5–21 to 6–16 in the final of the 1969–70 National League.

== Honours ==
=== Team ===
Kilcloney

- Carlow Minor Hurling Championship (1): 1950

Geraldine O'Hanrahan's

- Wexford Intermediate Hurling Championship (1): 1957

Wexford

- All-Ireland Senior Hurling Championship (3): 1955, 1956, 1960
- Leinster Senior Hurling Championship (3): 1955, 1956, 1960
- National Hurling League (2): 1955–56, 1957–58
