= Paddy Scanlan (hurler) =

Limerick hurling goalkeeper

Personal information
- Native name: Pádraig Ó Scanláin (Irish)
- Born: 13 October 1905 Castleconnell, County Limerick, Ireland
- Died: April 1977 (aged 71) Castleconnell, County Limerick, Ireland
- Occupation: Publican
- Height: 5 ft 11 in (180 cm)

Sport
- Sport: Hurling
- Position: Goalkeeper
Clubs
- Years: Club
- Young Irelands; Newport; Ahane; Liam Mellows
Club titles
- Limerick titles: 3
Inter-county*
Years	County	Apps (scores)
1932–1941	Limerick	32 (0-00)
Inter-county titles
- Munster titles: 5
- All-Irelands: 3
- NHL: 4
- *Inter County team apps and scores correct as of 18:22, 4 May 2015.

Patrick Scanlan (13 October 1905 – April 1977) was an Irish hurler who played as a goalkeeper at senior level for the Limerick county team.

Born in Castleconnell, County Limerick, Scanlan first played competitive hurling during his schooling at Limerick CBS. He arrived on the inter-county scene at the age of twenty-six when he first linked up with the Limerick senior team. He made his debut during the 1932 Thomond Feis. Scanlan immediately became a regular member of the starting fifteen and won two All-Ireland medals, five Munster medals and four National Hurling League medals. He was an All-Ireland runner-up on two occasions.

As a member of the Munster inter-provincial team on a number of occasions, Scanlan won four Railway Cup medals. At club level he was a three-time championship medallist with Ahane in Limerick and a one-time championship medallist with Liam Mellows in Galway.

Throughout his career Scanlan made 32 championship appearances. His retirement came following the conclusion of the 1941 championship.

In retirement from playing Scanlan became a highly respected referee at club championship level.

Scanlan is widely regarded as the greatest goalkeeper of his era and as Limerick's all-time number one custodian.

== Playing career ==
=== Club ===
Scanlan began his club career with Young Irelands and enjoyed much success in various tournament games.

A lack of competitive games in his native Castleconnell saw Scanlan and his comrades cross the border to Tipperary where they linked up with the Newport club.

In 1926 the Ahane club was formed with Scnalan serving on the organising committee. Success was slow in coming, however, after five years the club reached the summit of club hurling in Limerick. A 5-5 to 1-4 trouncing of Croom gave Ahane their first senior title, while it also gave Scanlan, who was captain of the team, his first championship medal.

Ahane failed to retain their title, however, Scanlan's team returned to the championship decider once again in 1933. A 1-7 to 1-1 defeat of Croom gave him his second championship medal.

Scanlan added a third championship medal to his collection in 1934 as Ahane retained their title following a 6-6 to 3-3 defeat of Kidimo.

A move to Galway shortly after this victory saw Scanlan join the Liam Mellows club. He won a championship medal in 1935 as Liam Mellows defeated Ballinderreen in the decider.

=== Inter-county ===
==== Beginnings ====
On 1 May 1932 Scanlan made his competitive debut for Limerick in a 5-5 to 4-1 semi-final defeat of Tipperary in the pre-season Thomond Feis. He was later included as goalkeeper on Limerick's unsuccessful championship team.

==== Dominance ====
In 1933 Limerick emerged as a major force after a decade in the doldrums. Scanlan lined out in his first Munster decider that year, as Limerick faced Waterford. With eight minutes left in the game, some spectators invaded the pitch and the match was abandoned. Since Limerick were winning by 3-7 to 1-2, the Munster Council declared them the champions and Scanlan collected his first Munster medal. The subsequent All-Ireland final on 3 September 1933 saw a record crowd of 45,176 travel to Croke Park to see Limerick face Kilkenny. After being level at the interval, the game remained close in the second half until a solo-run goal by Johnny Dunne sealed a 1-7 to 0-6 victory for Kilkenny.

A successful league campaign throughout 1933-34 saw Limerick reach the decider against Dublin. In spite of home advantage, Limerick had to battle hard for a 3-6 to 3-3 victory. It was Scanlan's first National Hurling League medal. The subsequent provincial championship saw Limerick reach the decider, where they played Waterford for the second year in-a-row. The result was much the same, with Scanlan collecting a second Munster medal following a 4-8 to 2-5 victory. The All-Ireland final on 2 September 1934 was a special occasion as it was the golden jubilee final of the Gaelic Athletic Association. Dublin were the opponents and a close game developed. After leading by a point at the interval, Limerick went five clear with time running out. Dublin fought their way back to secure a remarkable draw. An injury ruled Scanlan out of the replay and he was replaced in goal by Tom Shinny. Limerick won at the second attempt on a score line of 5-2 to 2-6.

Scanlon added a second league medal to his collection in 1935, as Limerick retained their title in a straightforward league format. Limerick dominated the provincial series of games once again, and lined out in the decider against Tipperary. Scanlan collected a third successive Munster medal following a 5-5 to 1-4 victory. Kilkenny were Limerick's opponents in the subsequent All-Ireland final on 1 September 1935 and, once again, the game was a close affair. Limerick were the red-hot favourites as a record crowd of over 46,000 turned up to watch a hurling classic. In spite of rain falling throughout the entire game both sides served up a great game. At the beginning of the second-half Lory Meagher sent over a huge point from midfield giving Kilkenny a lead which they would not surrender. The game ended in controversial circumstances for Mick Mackey when Limerick were awarded a close-in free to level the game. Jack Keane issued an instruction from the sideline that Timmy Ryan, the team captain, was to take the free and put the sliotar over the bar for the equalising point. As he lined up to take it, Mackey pushed him aside and took the free himself. The shot dropped short and into the waiting hands of the Kilkenny goalkeeper and was cleared. The game ended shortly after with Kilkenny triumphing by 2-5 to 2-4.

In 1936 Limerick embarked on a tour of the United States where they defeated a New York team made up of Irish expatriates. As a result of the tour Limerick were awarded a bye into the Munster final where they faced Tipperary. An injured Mick Mackey scored a remarkable 5-3 as Limerick trounced the opposition by 8-5 to 4-3. It was Scanlan's fourth successive Munster medal. For the third time in four years the lure of a Kilkenny-Limerick clash brought a record crowd of over 50,000 to Croke Park for the All-Ireland decider on 6 September 1936. The first half produced a game that lived up to the previous clashes, and Limerick had a two-point advantage at half-time. Jackie Power scored two first-half goals, while a solo-run goal by captain Mackey in the second-half helped Limerick to a 5-6 to 1-5 victory. It was Scanlan's first All-Ireland medal on the field of play.

==== Decline and comeback ====
In 1937 Scanlan secured a third league medal, however, Limerick's bid for a record-equalling fifth successive Munster crown came to an end in the provincial decider when Tipperary were victorious.

Limerick entered the record books in 1938 as the first team to win five consecutive National League titles. On a personal level it was a fourth winners' medal for Scanlan.

A period of decline followed for Limerick, however, the team returned for their swansong in 1940. After drawing the Munster final with Cork, Scanlan's team were in trouble in the replay. Held scoreless for the entire opening half, Limerick sprang to life for the second period of play. A pitch invasion scuppered the game for ten minutes, however, Limerick held on to win by 3-3 to 2-4 and Scanlan collected a fifth Munster medal. The subsequent All-Ireland decider on 1 September 1940 brought Kilkenny and Limerick together for the last great game between the two outstanding teams of the decade. Early in the second-half Kilkenny took a four-point lead, however, once Mick Mackey was deployed at midfield he proceeded to dominate the game. Limerick hung on to win the game on a score line of 3-7 to 1-7. The win gave Scanlan his second All-Ireland medal.

=== Inter-provincial ===
Scanlon also lined out with Munster in the inter-provincial hurling competition. He won his first Railway Cup medal in 1934 as Munster defeated Leinster. Scanlon won three more Railway Cup titles in 1937, 1938 and 1940.

== Honours ==
=== Player ===
Ahane

- Limerick Senior Hurling Championship (3): 1931 (c), 1933, 1934

Liam Mellows

- Galway Senior Hurling Championship (1): 1935

Limerick

- All-Ireland Senior Hurling Championship (3): 1934 1936, 1940
- Munster Senior Hurling Championship (5): 1933, 1934, 1936, 1940
- National Hurling League (4): 1933-34, 1934-35, 1936-37, 1937-38

Munster

- Railway Cup (4): 1934, 1937, 1938, 1940
