= 1956–57 National Hurling League =

26th season of the National Hurling League

League details
- Dates: 28 October 1956 – 25 August 1957
- Teams: 18

League champions
- Winners: Tipperary (7th win)

Other division winners
- Division 2: Kerry

The 1956–57 National Hurling League was the 26th season of the National Hurling League.

== Division 1 ==
National Hurling League Division 1
- Season: 1956-57
- Champions: Tipperary; 7th National League title Captain: Mickey Byrne
- All statistics correct as of 2 May 2017.

Wexford came into the season as defending champions of the 1955-56 season. Antrim entered Division 1 as the promoted team from the previous season.

On 12 May 1957, Tipperary won the title following a 3–11 to 2–7 win over Kilkenny in the final. It was their 7th league title overall and their first since 1954-55.

Westmeath were relegated from Division 1.

=== Group 1A table ===
Pos	Team	Pld	W	D	L	Pts	Notes
1	Kilkenny	4	4	0	0	8	Division 1 runners-up
2	Cork	4	3	0	1	6	
3	Wexford	4	1	1	2	3	
4	Waterford	4	1	1	2	3	
5	Dublin	4	0	0	4	0	

=== Group 1B table ===
Pos	Team	Pld	W	D	L	Pts	Notes
1	Tipperary	4	4	0	0	8	Division 1 champions
2	Clare	4	2	1	1	5	
3	Antrim	4	2	0	2	4	
4	Galway	4	1	1	2	3	
5	Westmeath	4	0	0	4	0	

=== Knock-out stage ===
Final

12 May 1957 Final	Tipperary	3-11 – 2-7	Kilkenny	Croke Park, Dublin
				Attendance: 43,721

== Division 2 ==
National Hurling League Division 2
- Season: 1956-57
- Champions: Kerry; 1st Division 2 title
- All statistics correct as of 2 May 2017.

=== Group 2A table ===
Pos	Team	Pld	W	D	L	Pts	Notes
1	Meath	3	3	0	0	6	Division 1 runners-up
2	Roscommon	2	1	0	1	2	
3	Wicklow	2	1	0	1	2	
4	Kildare	3	0	0	3	0	

=== Group 2B table ===
Pos	Team	Pld	W	D	L	Pts	Notes
1	Kerry	3	3	0	0	6	Division 2 champions
2	Limerick	3	2	0	1	4	
3	Offaly	3	1	0	2	2	
4	Laois	3	0	0	3	0	

=== Knock-out stage ===
Final

12 May 1957 Final	Kerry	6-1 - 4-7	Meath	Croke Park, Dublin
				Attendance: 43,721

25 August 1957 Final replay	Meath	3-6 - 4-13	Kerry	St. Loman's Park, Trim
