= 1951–52 National Hurling League =

21st season of the National Hurling League

League details
- Dates: 30 September 1951 – 18 May 1952

League champions
- Winners: Tipperary (4th win)

The 1951–52 National Hurling League was the 21st season of the National Hurling League.

== Division 1 ==
National Hurling League Division 1
- Season: 1951-52
- Champions: Tipperary; 4th National League title Captain: Pat Stakelum
- All statistics correct as of 19 March 2017.

The National Hurling League saw a major restructuring for the 1951-52 season. The old system of a four-group National League was abolished. Division 1 was split into two different groups of seven teams. The top-placed team in each group contested the home final.

Galway came into the season as defending champions of the 1950-51 season.

On 18 May 1952, Tipperary won the title after a 6-14 to 2-5 win over New York in the final. It was their 4th league title overall and their first since 1949-50.

=== Group A table ===
Pos	Team	Pld	W	D	L	Pts	Notes
1	Wexford	6	5	1	0	11	National League runners-up
2	Kilkenny	6	4	1	1	9	
3	Waterford	6	4	0	2	8	
4	Cork	6	3	0	3	6	
5	Dublin	6	2	1	3	5	
6	Laois	6	0	2	4	2	
7	Antrim	6	0	1	5	1	

=== Group B table ===
Pos	Team	Pld	W	D	L	Pts	Notes
1	Tipperary	6	6	0	0	12	National League winners
2	Galway	6	5	0	1	10	
3	Limerick	6	4	0	2	8	
4	Meath	6	3	0	3	6	
5	Offaly	6	2	0	4	4	
6	Clare	6	1	0	5	2	
7	Westmeath	6	0	1	5	1	

=== Knock-out stage ===
Home final

20 April 1952 Home Final	Tipperary	4-7 – 4-6	Wexford	Croke Park, Dublin

Final

18 May 1952 Final	New York	2-5 - 6-14	Tipperary	Croke Park, Dublin
