= 1957–58 National Hurling League =

27th season of the National Hurling League

League details
- Dates: 13 October 1957 – 11 May 1958
- Teams: 19

League champions
- Winners: Wexford (2nd win)
- Captain: Harry O'Connor

League runners-up
- Runners-up: Limerick
- Captain: Dermot Kelly

The 1957–58 National Hurling League was the 27th season of the National Hurling League.

== Division 1 ==
National Hurling League Division 1
- Season: 1957-58
- Champions: Wexford; 2nd National League title Captain: Harry O'Connor
- All statistics correct as of 2 May 2017.

Tipperary came into the season as defending champions of the 1956-57 season. Kerry and Limerick entered Division 1 as the promoted team from the previous season.

On 11 May 1958, Wexford won the title following a 5-7 to 4-8 victory over Limerick in the final. It was their second league title overall and their first since 1955-56.

=== Group 1A table ===
Pos	Team	Pld	W	D	L	Pts	Notes
1	Wexford	5	5	0	0	8	Division 1 champions
2	Kilkenny	5	3	0	2	6	
3	Dublin	5	3	0	2	6	
4	Waterford	5	2	0	3	4	
5	Cork	5	2	0	3	4	
6	Antrim	5	0	0	5	0	

=== Group 1B table ===
Pos	Team	Pld	W	D	L	Pts	Notes
1	Limerick	4	4	0	0	8	Division 1 runners-up
2	Clare	4	2	0	2	4	
3	Tipperary	3	2	0	1	4	
4	Galway	3	1	0	2	2	
5	Kerry	4	0	0	4	0	

=== Knock-out stage ===
Final

11 May 1958 Final	Wexford	5-07 – 4-08	Limerick	Croke Park, Dublin
	Padge Kehoe 2-1, M Codd 2-0, T Flood 1-1, O Gough 0-4, O McGrath 0-1.		L Moloney 2-1, V Cobbe 1-2, N Stokes 1-1, J Shanahan 0-2, L Hogan 0-1, T Casey 0-1.	Attendance: 26,166; Referee: J Gallagher (Galway)

== Division 2 ==
National Hurling League Division 2
- Season: 1957-58
- Champions: Carlow; 1st Division 2 title
- All statistics correct as of 3 May 2017.

=== Group 2A table ===
Pos	Team	Pld	W	D	L	Pts	Notes
1	Offaly	3	3	0	0	6	Division 2 runners-up
2	Laois	2	1	0	1	2	
3	Meath	2	1	0	1	2	
4	Westmeath	2	1	0	1	2	

=== Group 2B table ===
Pos	Team	Pld	W	D	L	Pts	Notes
1	Carlow	3	2	1	0	4	Division 2 champions
2	Kildare	3	2	0	1	4	
3	Wicklow	3	2	0	1	4	
4	Roscommon	3	0	0	3	0	

=== Knock-out stage ===
Final

Final	Carlow	3-7 - 0-4	Offaly
