= 1960–61 National Hurling League =

30th season of the National Hurling League

League details
- Dates: 23 October 1960 – 7 May 1961

League champions
- Winners: Tipperary (10th win)

The 1960–61 National Hurling League was the 30th season of the National Hurling League.

== Division 1 ==
National Hurling League Division 1
- Season: 1960-61
- Champions: Tipperary; 10th National League title Captain: Matt Hassett
- All statistics correct as of 26 February 2017.

Tipperary came into the season as defending champions of the 1959-60 season. Kerry entered Division 1 as the promoted team.

On 7 May 1961, Tipperary won the title after a 6–6 to 4–9 win over Waterford in the final. It was their third league title in succession and their 10th league title overall.

=== Division 1A table ===
Pos	Team	Pld	W	D	L	Pts	Notes
1	Waterford	5	5	0	0	10	National League runners-up
2	Cork	5	2	2	1	6	
3	Wexford	5	2	1	2	5	
4	Kilkenny	5	2	1	2	5	
5	Dublin	5	2	0	3	4	
6	Antrim	5	0	0	5	0	

=== Group stage ===
23 October 1960	Antrim	1-02 - 4-10	Dublin	Casement Park, Belfast
	J Mullalley 1-0, D Donnelly 0-2.		B Boothman 2-0, A Boothman 1-1, K McLoughlin 1-1, E Demspey 0-3, J Malone 0-2, L Shannon 0-2, N Roe 0-1.

23 October 1960	Wexford	1-07 - 0-12	Waterford	O'Kennedy Park, New Ross
	P Kehoe 1-6, J Kennedy 0-1, T Flood 0-1.		F Walsh 0-6, P Grimes 0-2, B Foley 0-1, M Óg Morrissey 0-1, L Guinan 0-1.

30 October 1960	Kilkenny	2-02 - 1-05	Cork	Nowlan Park, Kilkenny
	P Ryan 1-0, R Holden 1-0, E Keher 0-1, S Clohessy 0-1.		J Twomey 1-0, M Quane 0-1, T Kelly 0-1, R Siske 0-1, J O'Sullivan 0-1, W Carroll 0-1.

6 November 1960	Dublin	1-05 - 1-14	Wexford	Croke Park, Dublin
	C Hayes 1-1, B Boothman 0-1, K McLoughlin 0-1, C Leaney 0-1, L Foley 0-1.		J Harding 1-1, J O'Brien 0-3, O McGrath 0-2, S Quaid 0-2, T Flood 0-2, P Kehoe 0-1, M Lyng 0-1, J Nolan 0-1, M Bergin 0-1.	Referee: B Smith (Meath)

6 November 1960	Waterford	5-14 - 3-05	Kilkenny	Waterford Sportsfield, Waterford
	F Walsh 1-5, B Foley 1-2, P Grimes 1-1, T Walsh 1-1, S Power 1-0, D Whelan 0-3, L Guinan 0-2.		E Keher 3-2, B Dwyer 0-2, S Carroll 0-1.	Referee: S O'Dwyer (Tipperary)

6 November 1960	Cork	6-07 - 1-02	Antrim	Cork Athletic Grounds, Cork
	M Quane 3-1, W Carroll 1-2, M Mortell 1-1, J Twomey 1-0, JJ Browne 0-1, J Ahern 0-1, P Fitzgerald 0-1.		J McVeigh 1-0, D Kearney 0-1, F Walsh 0-1.

12 February 1961	Waterford	7-08 - 0-06	Dublin	Waterford Sportsfield, Waterford
	F Walsh 2-3, B Foley 2-1, T Walsh 1-1, D Whelan 1-0, L Guinan 1-0, S Power 0-2, T Cheatsy 0-1.		D Foley 0-2, B Boothman 0-2, F Whelan 0-2.

12 February 1961	Kilkenny	7-11 - 2-06	Antrim	Nowlan Park, Kilkenny
	J Ayres 1-5, T O'Connell 2-1, B Dwyer 2-0, S Clohessy 1-1, R Walsh 0-4, D Heaslip 1-0.		P McManus 2-4, J McVeigh 0-2.	Referee: R Sheppard (Carlow)

12 February 1961	Wexford	2-10 - 3-07	Cork	St. Patrick's Park, Enniscorthy
	T Flood 1-2, S Quaid 1-1, J O'Brien 0-2, O McGrath 0-2, P Kehoe 0-2.		C Ring 2-3, P Duggan 1-0, M Mortell 0-3, P Harte 0-1.	Referee: J Dowling (Offaly)

12 March 1961	Cork	4-06 - 4-09	Waterford	Cork Athletic Grounds, Cork
	C Ring 2-2, N Gallagher 1-1, M Quane 1-0, P Duggan 0-1, R Browne 0-1, M Mortell 0-1.		D Whelan 2-0, P Grimes 0-4, T Walsh 1-0, L Guinan 1-0, S Power 0-2, T Cheasty 0-1, F Walsh 0-1, B Foley 0-1.

12 March 1961	Kilkenny	1-05 - 2-06	Dublin	Nowlan Park, Kilkenny
	E Keher 1-1, T O'Connell 0-2, B Dwyer 0-1, S Clohessy 0-1.		D Foley 1-1, F Whelan 0-4, M Bermingham 1-0, N Brooks 0-1.

9 April 1961	Dublin	2-07 - 5-08	Cork	Croke Park, Dublin
	W Jackson 1-1, S Cooney 1-0, A Boothman 0-2, B Boothman 0-2, C Leaney 0-2.		M Quane 2-1, R Browne 2-1, C Ring 0-5, M Mortell 1-0, P Behan 0-1.

9 April 1961	Wexford	4-05 - 6-05	Kilkenny	Wexford Park, Wexford
	J Walsh 1-3, P Kehoe 1-1, N Wheeler 1-0, O McGrath 1-0, S Quaid 0-1.		J Doyle 2-1, S Clohessy 2-0, M O'Neill 1-1, M Carroll 1-1, B Dwyer 0-2.

9 April 1961	Waterford	7-12 - 3-01	Antrim	Waterford Sportsfield, Waterford
	D Whelan 4-0, F Walsh 0-8, B Foley 1-2, T Walsh 1-0, M Murphy 1-0, M Dempsey 0-1, L Guinan 0-1.		D Donnelly 1-0, J Hughes 1-0, T Mullaney 1-0, B McGuirk 0-1.

=== Division 1B table ===
Pos	Team	Pld	W	D	L	Pts	Notes
1	Tipperary	5	5	0	0	10	National League champions
2	Limerick	5	4	0	1	8	
3	Clare	5	1	2	2	4	
4	Galway	4	1	1	2	3	
5	Carlow	5	1	1	3	3	
6	Kerry	4	0	0	4	0	

=== Group stage ===
23 October 1960	Clare	8-11 - 2-03	Kerry	Cusack Park, Ennis

30 October 1960	Tipperary	3-05 - 3-03	Galway	Thurles Sportsfield, Thurles
	D Nealon 2-0, T Moloughney 1-0, W Donovan 0-2, B Moloughney 0-1, D Ryan 0-1, F Ryan 0-1.		T Sweeney 1-2, L Gardner 1-1, J Casey 1-0.

6 November 1960	Galway	2-05 - 2-05	Clare	Gort Sportsfield, Gort
	T Sweeney 2-4, J Sweeney 0-1.		C Madigan 1-1, N Jordan 1-0, P Vaughan 0-3, M O'Shea 0-1.	Referee: S Spain (Offaly)

6 November 1960	Carlow	2-05 - 5-07	Tipperary	Dr. Cullen Park, Carlow
	W "Red" Walsh 1-1, W "Black" Walsh 0-4, W Hogan 1-0.		D Nealon 3-2, T Moloughney 2-1, T Ryan 0-2, T Wall 0-1, W O'Donovan 0-1.

20 November 1960	Kerry	1-03 - 8-05	Limerick	Ardfert
	S O'Sullivan 1-0, J Barry 0-3.		Jim Quaid 2-3, L Hogan 2-1, J Hayes 1-0, P Herbert 1-0, D McCarthy 1-0, T Meaney 1-0, D Flynn 0-1.

12 February 1961	Tipperary	5-07 - 3-07	Clare	St. Cronan's Park, Roscrea
	D Nealon 2-5, T Moloughney 2-0, W Moloughney 1-0, W O'Donovan 0-1, T Ryan (Killenaule) 0-1.		J Barrett 1-3, J Smyth 1-0, C Madigan 1-0, N Jordan 0-2, P Henchy 0-1, M O'Shea 0-1.	Referee: S Spain (Offaly)

12 February 1961	Carlow	3-14 - 1-02	Kerry	Dr. Cullen Park, Carlow
	P Brophy 1-2, M Long 0-5, W "Red" Walsh 1-1, N Long 1-0, M Morrissey 0-2, P McGovern 0-2, W Hogan 0-1, W "Black" Walsh 0-1.		P J Riordan 1-0, M Goodmille 0-1, R McElligott 0-1.

5 March 1961	Limerick	8-05 - 1-08	Carlow	FitzGerald Park, Kilmallock
	PJ Keane 2-0, D McCarthy 1-2, T McGarry 1-1, D Flynn 1-1, J Quaid 1-0, P Cobbe 1-0, E Carey 1-0, M Heffernan 0-1.		E Long 1-2, P McGovern 0-3, L Walsh 0-1, M Walsh 0-1, M Morrissey 0-1.

12 March 1961	Clare	2-05 - 3-03	Limerick	Thurles Sportsfield, Thurles
	N Jordan 1-3, J Smyth 1-1, T Cleary 0-1.		D Flynn 2-0, L Heffernan 1-0, L Hogan 0-1, PJ Keane 0-1, J Leonard 0-1.

12 March 1961	Tipperary	10-10 - 0-02	Kerry	Thurles Sportsfield, Thurles
	D Nealon 4-1, B Moloughney 2-0, L Devaney 1-2, J Doyle 1-1, T Ryan (Toomevara) 1-1, T Moloughney 1-0, P Dorney 0-3, M Burns 0-1, T Ryan (Killenaule) 0-1.		J Moloney 0-1, K Dermody 0-1.	Referee: S Gleeson (Limerick)

12 March 1961	Galway	5-12 - 3-04	Carlow	Duggan Park, Ballinasloe
	PJ Lawless 3-2, S Gohery 2-0, L Gardiner 0-5, P Fahy 0-2, M Sweeney 0-2, B Kilkelly 0-1.		J McCarthy 2-2, P Brophy 1-0, L Walsh 0-1, PJ Hogan 0-1.

26 March 1961	Limerick	3-08 - 1-08	Galway	Gaelic Grounds, Limerick
	T McGarry 1-6, D Flynn 1-0, P Cobbe 1-0, B Kelleher 0-1, L Hogan 0-1.		S Devlin 1-1, J Salmon 0-3, T Sweeney 0-2, S Gohery 0-1, M Gardiner 0-1.	Referee: S Spain (Offaly)

9 April 1961	Limerick	1-07 - 6-09	Tipperary	Gaelic Grounds, Limerick
	M Hayes 1-0, T McGarry 0-3, D Flynn 0-1, PJ Keane 0-1, D Kelly 0-1, L Hogan 0-1.		W Moloughney 4-0, J Doyle 1-2, L Connolly 1-0, T Moloughney 0-2, T Wall 0-2, T Ryan 0-1, T English 0-1, D Nealon 0-1.	Referee: J Gallagher (Galway)

9 April 1961	Carlow	2-09 - 3-06	Clare	Dr. Cullen Park, Carlow
	J McCarthy 2-2, W "Red" Walsh 0-6, M Morrissey 0-1.		J Smyth 3-4, F Cleary 0-1, T Cleary 0-1.

=== Knock-out stage ===
Final

7 May 1961 Final	Tipperary	6-06 - 4-09	Waterford	Croke Park, Dublin
	D Nealon 2-1, J McKenna 2-0, T Ryan 1-1, W Moloughney 1-1, L Devaney 0-1, Jimmy Doyle 0-1, T Moloughney 0-1.		M Murphy 2-0, P Grimes 1-3, T Walsh 1-0, T Cheasty 0-3, F Walsh 0-2, S Power 0-1.	Attendance: 25,072; Referee: G Fitzgerald (Limerick)
