= National Hurling League =

Annual inter-county hurling competition

Allianz National Hurling League
- Current season or competition: 2027 National Hurling League
- Irish: Sraith Iomána Náisiúnta
- Code: Hurling
- Founded: 1925–1926; 100 years ago
- Region: Ireland; Britain (GAA)
- No. of teams: 35
- Title holders: Limerick (15th title)
- Most titles: Kilkenny; Tipperary (19 titles)
- Sponsors: Allianz
- TV partner(s): RTÉ2, TG4 and Eir Sport; Premier Sports (UK, including NI)
- Official website: Official website

The National Hurling League is an annual inter-county hurling competition featuring teams from Ireland and England. Founded in 1925 by the Gaelic Athletic Association, it operates on a system of promotion and relegation within the league system.

The league has 35 teams divided into five divisions, with seven teams in each division. Promotion and relegation between these divisions is a central feature of the league. Although primarily a competition for Irish teams, teams from England – currently Lancashire, London and Warwickshire – also take part, while in the past New York also fielded a team for the latter stages of the league. Teams representing subdivisions of counties, such as Fingal and South Down have also participated at various times.

The National Hurling League has been associated with a title sponsor since 1985. Ford, Royal Liver and Church & General have all served as sponsors of the league since then. The competition is currently sponsored by Allianz and is officially known as the Allianz Hurling League.

The league season runs from late January to March with each team in the group playing each other once. The top two teams in Division 1A will advance to the National Hurling League Final. The winners of the League title are awarded the Dr Croke Cup and are officially regarded as the National Hurling League champions.

The National Hurling League title has been won by 10 different teams, 9 of whom have won the title more than once. The all-time record-holders are Tipperary and Kilkenny, who have won the league on 19 occasions. Limerick won the 2026 title.

== History ==
=== Creation ===
Since 1887, the All-Ireland Championship had been steadily growing in interest and in participation. The championship, however, was largely confined to the summer months, resulting in a lack of top class inter-county action between September and April. Inter-county tournament games were popular as a way of filling the void, while some provinces organised their own pre-championship competitions, most notably the Thomond Feis in Munster. Several counties had also organised inter-club leagues as a means of supplementing the county championship by providing more games. While these had proved successful, it was decided to create a national senior inter-county league to provide games during the winter and spring months.

=== Beginnings ===
The inaugural National Hurling League began on 27 September 1925 and ended on 16 May 1926. Seven teams - Cork, Dublin, Galway. Kilkenny, Laois, Limerick and Tipperary - competed in a six-game single round-robin format. At the end of the group stage the top two teams contested the league final. Cork won the 1925–26 league following a 3–7 to 1–5 defeat of Dublin in the final.

=== Development ===
While no league took place during the 1926–27 season, the 1927–28 league featured nine teams. A single round-robin format was once again used, with each team playing eight games. The second league featured no final, with Tipperary being declared champions after securing 14 points from their group stage games.

The 1928-29 league featured twelve teams divided in two groups based on geographical position. The Eastern Division comprised five teams from the province of Leinster, while the Southwestern Division had seven teams from the province of Munster and Galway. The top teams in each division played off in the final to determine the champions. This format was used on a number of occasions until the 1934–35, when the league reverted to a straightforward one-group league with the top-placed team being declared the champions. This format was used again during the leagues in 1935–36 and 1936–37.

Ten teams entered the 1937–38 league, with two groups of five teams competing. A third group was added in 1938–39 as the number of teams increased to thirteen. These formats were regularly used over the following seasons, depending on the number of teams participating.

Between 1941 and 1945 the league was suspended due to the Emergency.

The 1955–56 league saw the introduction of a major change in format. As a result of a lack of interest from defeated first-round teams in recent years, Central Council introduced a two-division league featuring a new system of relegation and promotion. Division 1 was confined to ten teams in two groups of five. The bottom-placed team in each group would play off to decide which of the two teams would be relegated. Division 2 was made up of the 'second tier' hurling teams and featured eight teams divided into two groups. Limerick became the first team to be relegated, while Antrim became the first team to gain promotion under the new system.

=== Format history ===
- 2009–2011: Division 1 (8), Division 2 (8), Division 3A (6), Division 3B (7), Division 4 (6).
- 2012–2019: Division 1A (6), Division 1B (6), Division 2A (6), Division 2B (6), Division 3A (6), Division 3B (5).
- 2020–2024: Division 1 (12), Division 2A (6), Division 2B (6), Division 3A (6), Division 3B (5).
- 2025–present: Division 1A (7), Division 1B (7), Division 2 (7), Division 3 (7), Division 4 (7).

== Schedule ==
In the 20th century, National League fixtures were played during inter-county windows in the later and early months of the calendar year, while the SHC occupied the inter-county window during those months that made up the middle of the year, e.g. May, August. Club competitions of lesser importance occurred alongside the inter-county games so as to provide meaningful game time for players possessed of insufficient ability to compete at the higher (inter-county) level.

From 1997, National League fixtures were played during the early months of the calendar year, preceding the SHC, which remained in the traditional mid-year position. An April club window allowed inter-county players to return to their clubs to participate in some early rounds of the more important club competitions, i.e. championship fixtures.

This arrangement was disrupted during the COVID-19 pandemic. Due to the impact of the pandemic on Gaelic games, the 2020 National League was suspended in March and all Gaelic games ceased until the middle of the year, when club fixtures were first to resume. The National League was then completed in October, ahead of the All-Ireland Senior Hurling Championship (which was completed in December). This led to a motion (passed at the 2021 GAA Congress) to adopt a "split season" model, whereby club competitions would occupy one part of the calendar year and inter-county fixtures the other part.

== Sponsorship ==
Since 1985, the National Hurling League has been sponsored. The sponsor has usually been able to determine the league's sponsorship name.

Period	Sponsor(s)	Name
1925–1985	No main sponsor	The National Hurling League
1985–1987	(United States) Ford	The Ford National Hurling League
1987–1992	(Republic of Ireland) Royal Liver	The Royal Liver National Hurling League
1992–1999	(Republic of Ireland) Church & General	The Church & General National Hurling League
1999–	(Germany) Allianz	The Allianz Hurling League

The GAA’s sponsorship arrangements with Allianz have come under scrutiny after the global insurer was named in a United Nations report as one of the companies said to be aiding Israel’s war in Gaza. Allianz is today the world's largest non-Israeli buyer of Israeli state bonds and, therefore, an essential financial backer of the ongoing genocide. Despite protests and calls from several county boards and hundreds of players to drop the brand, the GAA's Management Committee and Central Council voted overwhelmingly to reaffirm the partnership through 2030.

== Division 1 ==
=== History ===
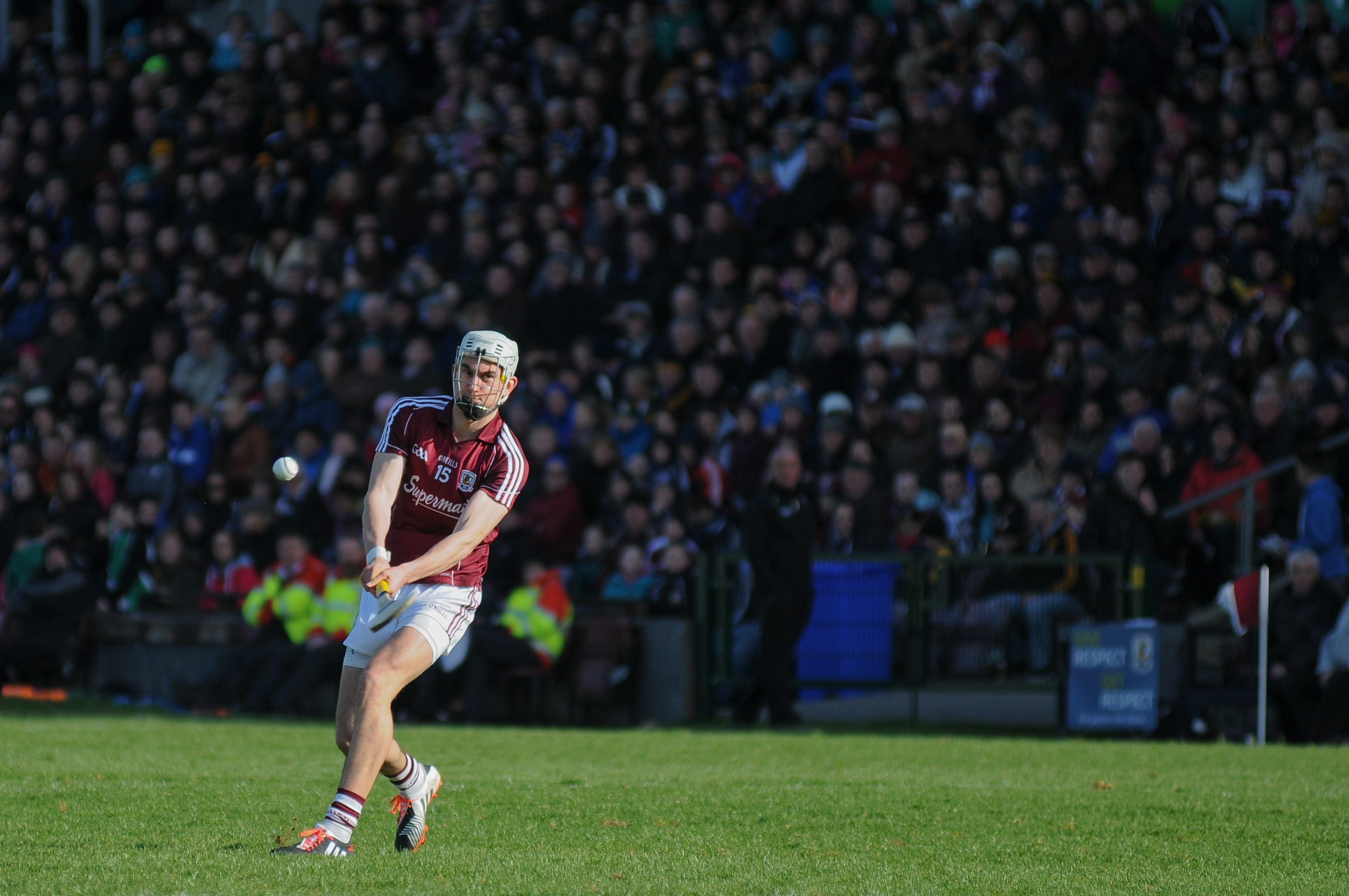
Jason Flynn in action for Galway against Kilkenny in the 2015 National Hurling League

Division 1 has existed in its current form since the 2012 league. Prior to this, Division 1 had existed as a single division of eight teams. The new division, comprising two groups, was created using the final rankings from the 2011 league. The top six teams from that year's Division 1 were added to the new Division 1A. The bottom two teams from Division 1 and the top four teams from Division 2 were added to the new Division 1B.

In 2012 and 2013, the top two teams in Division 1B contested a final, with the winners joining the top three teams from Division 1A in the semi-finals of the league proper. This format was abandoned when the quarter-final stage was introduced during the 2014 league.

=== Format ===
There are currently seven teams in Division 1A.

During the course of a season (from February to March) each team plays the others once (a single round-robin system) for a total of 21 games. Teams receive two points for a win and one point for a draw. No points are awarded for a loss. Where two teams are level on points, the team that wins the head-to-head match is ranked ahead. If this game is a draw, points difference (total scored minus total conceded in all games) is used to rank the teams. Where three or more teams are level on points, points difference is used to rank them.

The top two teams in Division 1A contest the National Hurling League final. The bottom two teams in Division 1A are relegated to Division 1B.

=== 2027 Teams ===
The following seven teams will compete in Division 1A during the 2027 league.

Team	Position in table in 2026	First year in top flight	In top flight since	Division 1 titles	Last Division 1 title
Clare	Division 1B promoted	1927–28	2027	5	2024
Cork		1925–26	2015	15	2025
Dublin	Division 1B promoted	1925–26	2027	3	2011
Galway	4th	1925–26	2020	11	2021
Kilkenny	5th	1925–26	1994–95	19	2021
Limerick		1925–26	2019	15	2026
Tipperary	3rd	1925–26	1987–88	19	2008

=== Venues ===
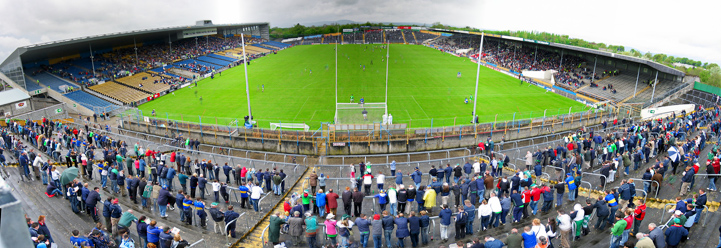
Semple Stadium, as well as being the home stadium of Tipperary, is a regular venue for semi-finals and finals.

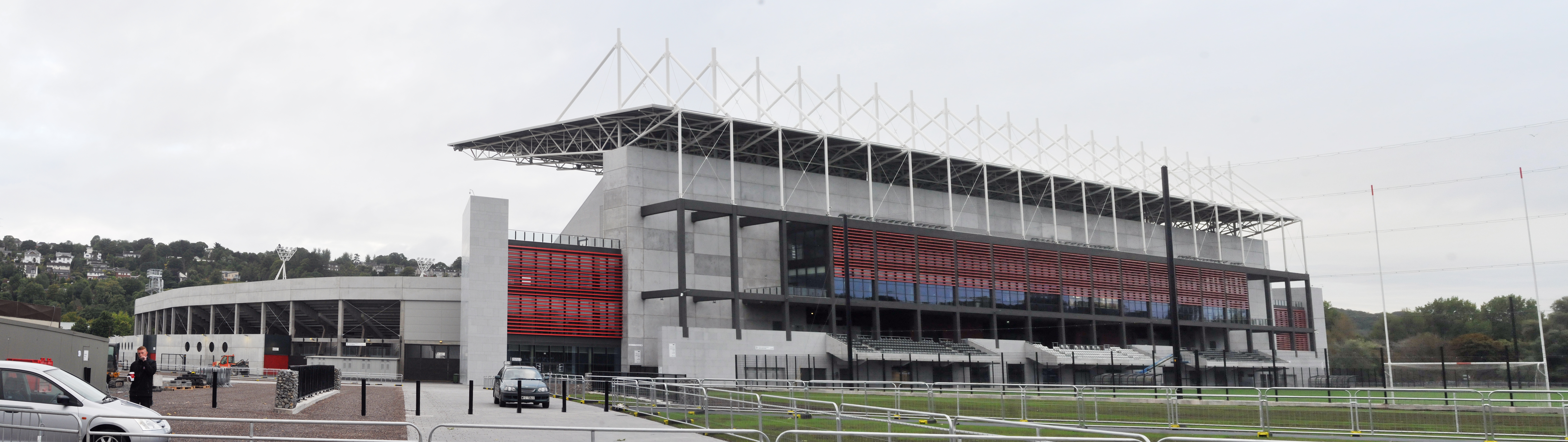
Páirc Uí Chaoimh is the home stadium of Cork.

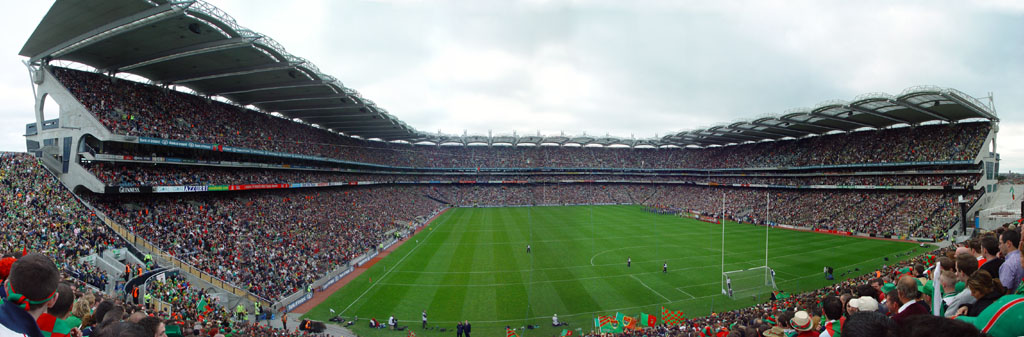
Croke Park last hosted the league final in 2019.

==== Attendances ====
Stadium attendances are a significant source of regular income for Central Council and for the teams involved. For the knock-out stages of the 2017 league, average attendances were 12,474 with a total aggregate attendance figure of 87,321 for the seven games.

==== Group stage ====
The league is operated using a home and away basis every second year. Fixtures in the five group stage rounds of the league are played at the home ground of one of the two teams involved. Each team is guaranteed at least two home games.

==== Quarter-finals ====
The quarter-finals of the league are usually played at the home venue of one of the teams involved. The team which receives home advantage is decided by using the home and away agreement or by a coin toss.

==== Semi-finals ====
The semi-finals of the league are usually played on the same day at the same venue as part of a double-header of games. Semple Stadium, Nowlan Park and the Gaelic Grounds have all been used as the venues for the semi-finals.

==== Final ====
Since 2000, Semple Stadium has been used on ten occasions as the host venue for the league final. The Gaelic Grounds, Nowlan Park and Croke Park have also been used as the final venue during this time.

=== Managers ===
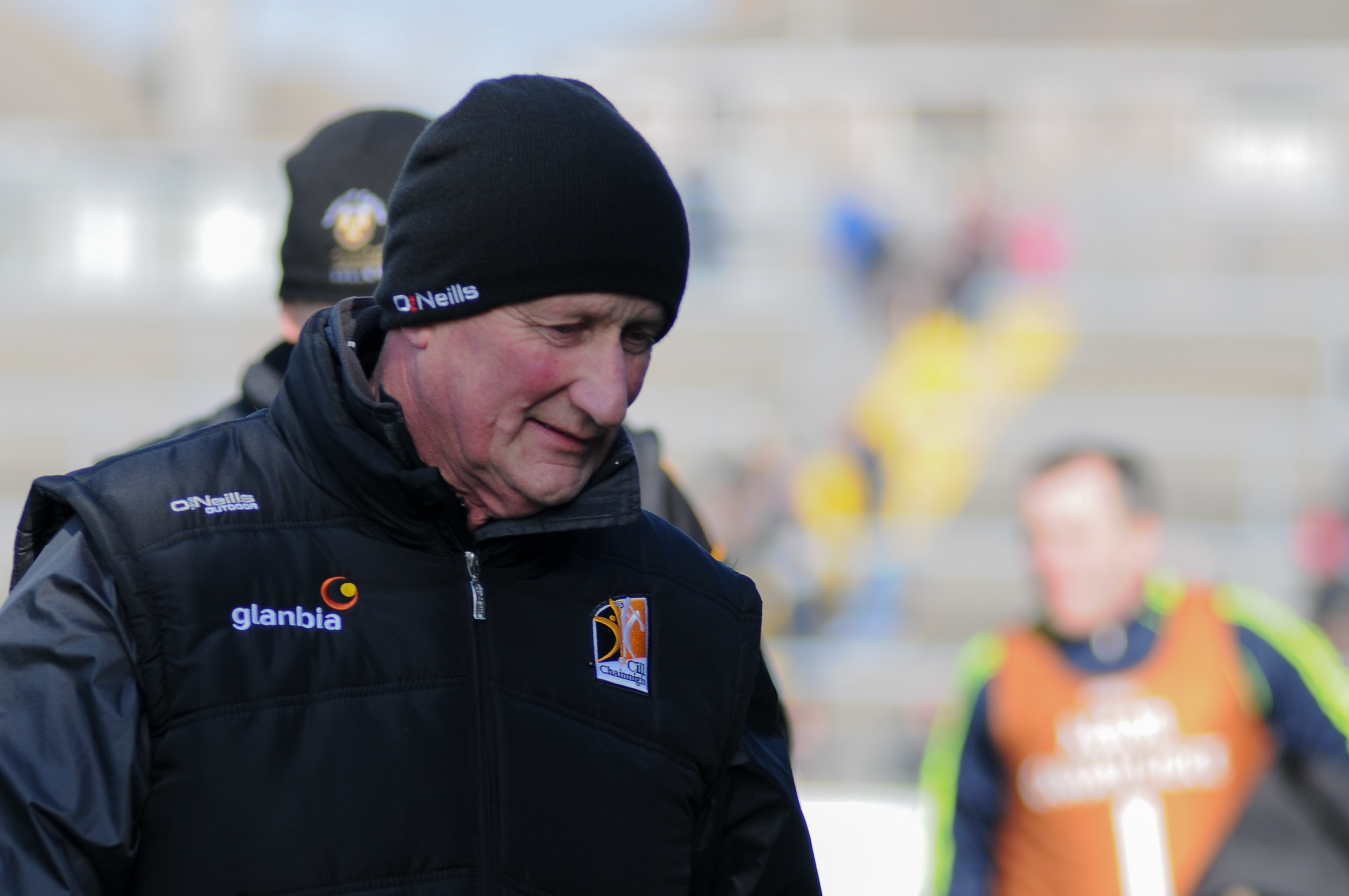
Brian Cody managed Kilkenny to 10 league titles.

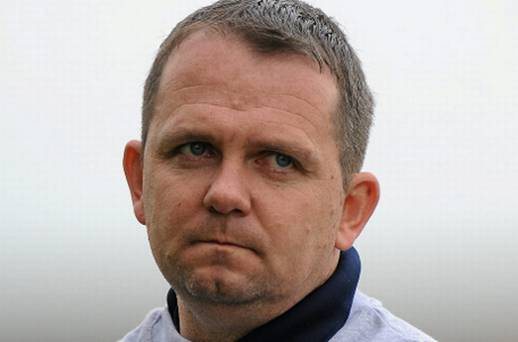
Davy Fitzgerald managed Clare to the title in 2016.

Managers in the National Hurling League are involved in the day-to-day running of the team, including the training, team selection, and sourcing of players from the club championships. Their influence varies from county-to-county and is related to the individual county boards. From 2018, all inter-county head coaches must be Award 2 qualified. The manager is assisted by a team of two or three selectors and an extensive backroom team consisting of various coaches. Prior to the development of the concept of a manager in the 1970s, teams were usually managed by a team of selectors with one member acting as chairman.

Winning managers (1976–2021)
Manager	Team	Wins	Winning years
Brian Cody	Kilkenny	10	2002, 2003, 2005, 2006, 2009, 2012, 2013, 2014, 2018, 2021
John Kiely	Limerick	4	2019, 2020, 2023, 2026
Pat Henderson	Kilkenny	3	1981-82, 1982-83, 1985-86
Justin McCarthy	Clare; Waterford	3	1977, 1978; 2007
Fr. Harry Bohan	Clare	2	1977, 1978
Noel Drumgoole	Limerick	2	1983-84, 1984-85
Nicky English	Tipperary	2	1999, 2001
Cyril Farrell	Galway	2	1986-87, 1988-89
Michael Keating	Tipperary	2	1987-88, 1993-94
Mattie Murphy	Galway	2	1995-96, 2000
Jimmy Barry-Murphy	Cork	1	1998
Phil Bennis	Limerick	1	1991-92
Anthony Daly	Dublin	1	2011
Micheál Donoghue	Galway	1	2017
Davy Fitzgerald	Clare	1	2016
Len Gaynor	Cork	1	1978-79
Conor Hayes	Galway	1	2004
Dermot Healy	Kilkenny	1	1989-90
Pádraig Horan	Offaly	1	1990-91
Gerald McCarthy	Cork	1	1980-81
Derek McGrath	Waterford	1	2015
John McIntyre	Galway	1	2010
Michael O'Brien	Cork	1	1992-93
Tom Ryan	Limerick	1	1997
Liam Sheedy	Tipperary	1	2008
Bertie Troy	Cork	1	1979-80
Ollie Walsh	Kilkenny	1	1994-95
Shane O'Neill	Galway	1	2021
Liam Cahill	Waterford	1	2022
Brian Lohan	Clare	1	2024

Notes

1. Clare (CE): Fr. Harry Bohan and Justin McCarthy co-managed Clare to success in 1977 and 1978.

== Winners ==
=== By county ===
County	Titles	Runners-up	Years won	Years runners-up
Tipperary	19	21	1927–28, 1948–49, 1949–50, 1951–52, 1953–54, 1954–55, 1956–57, 1958–59, 1959–60, 1960–61, 1963–64, 1964–65, 1967–68, 1978–79, 1987–88, 1993–94, 1999, 2001, 2008	1930–31, 1937–38, 1939–40, 1947–48, 1952–53, 1955–56, 1962–63, 1965–66, 1970–71, 1974–75, 1988–89, 1991–92, 1995–96, 2000, 2003, 2009, 2013, 2014, 2017, 2018, 2025
Kilkenny	19	13	1932–33, 1961–62, 1965–66, 1975–76, 1981–82, 1982–83, 1985–86, 1989–90, 1994–95, 2002, 2003, 2005, 2006, 2009, 2012, 2013, 2014, 2018, 2021*	1946–47, 1949–50, 1953–54, 1956–57, 1964–65, 1966–67, 1967–68, 1976–77, 1977–78, 2007, 2011, 2023, 2024
Cork	15	10	1925–26, 1929–30, 1939–40, 1940–41, 1947–48, 1952–53, 1968–69, 1969–70, 1971–72, 1973–74, 1979–80, 1980–81, 1992–93, 1998, 2025	1928–29, 1948–49, 1959–60, 1961–62, 2002, 2010, 2012, 2015, 2022, 2026
Limerick	15	9	1933–34, 1934–35, 1935–36, 1936–37, 1937–38, 1946–47, 1970–71, 1983–84, 1984–85, 1991–92, 1997, 2019, 2020, 2023, 2026	1932–33, 1957–58, 1969–70, 1971–72, 1972–73, 1973–74, 1979–80, 1982–83, 2006
Galway	11	6	1930–31, 1950–51, 1974–75, 1986–87, 1988–89, 1995–96, 2000, 2004, 2010, 2017, 2021*	1978–79, 1985–86, 1993–94, 1997, 1999, 2008
Clare	5	7	1945–46, 1976–77, 1977–78, 2016, 2024	1975–76, 1984–85, 1986–87, 1994–95, 2001, 2005, 2020
Wexford	4	10	1955–56, 1957–58, 1966–67, 1972–73	1950–51, 1951–52, 1954–55, 1963–64, 1968–69, 1981–82, 1983–84, 1989–90, 1990–91, 1992–93
Waterford	4	7	1962–63, 2007, 2015, 2022	1938–39, 1958–59, 1960–61, 1998, 2004, 2016, 2019
Dublin	3	5	1928–29, 1938–39, 2011	1925–26, 1929–30, 1933–34, 1940–41, 1945–46
Offaly	1	2	1990–91	1980–81, 1987–88

=== Notes ===
- Kilkenny and Galway shared the 2021 title

=== Wins by provinces ===
County	Title(s)	Runners-up	Total
Munster	57	53	110
Leinster	27	30	57
Connacht	11	6	17
Ulster	0	0	0

== List of finals ==
=== Legend ===
All-Ireland champions
All-Ireland runners-up

=== List of finals ===
Year	Winners		Runners-up		Venue	Winning Captain
Year	County	Score	County	Score	Venue	Winning Captain
1925–26	Cork	3–7	Dublin	1–5		Seán Óg Murphy
1926–27	League not held					
1927–28	Tipperary	won on points system with 14 points from eight games				Johnny Leahy
1928–29	Dublin	7–4	Cork	5–5		Mick Gill
1929–30	Cork	3–5	Dublin	3–0		Eudie Coughlan
1930–31	Galway	4–5	Tipperary	4–4		Ignatius Harney
1931–32	League not held					
1932–33	Kilkenny	3–8	Limerick	1–3	Nowlan Park	Eddie Doyle
1933–34	Limerick	3–6	Dublin	3–3	Gaelic Grounds	Mick Kennedy
1934–35	Limerick	won on points system with 15 points from eight games				Timmy Ryan
1935–36	Limerick	won on points system with 15 points from eight games				Timmy Ryan
1936–37	Limerick	won on points system with 13 points from eight games				Mick Mackey
1937–38	Limerick	5-2	Tipperary	1-1		Mick Mackey
1938–39	Dublin	1–8	Waterford	1–4		Mick Daniels
1939–40	Cork	8-9	Tipperary	6-4		Jack Lynch
1940–41	Cork	4–11	Dublin	2–7		Connie Buckley
1941-45	League suspended for four seasons					
1945–46	Clare	2–10	Dublin	2–5	After a replay	Mick Daly
1946–47	Limerick	3–8	Kilkenny	1–7	After a replay	Jackie Power
1947–48	Cork	3–3	Tipperary	1–2		Jim Young
1948–49	Tipperary	3–5	Cork	3–3		Pat Stakelum
1949–50	Tipperary	3–8	Kilkenny	1–10		Seán Kenny
1950–51	Galway	6–7	Wexford	3–4		M. J. 'Inky' Flaherty
1951–52	Tipperary	4–7	Wexford	4–6		Pat Stakelum
1952–53	Cork	2–10	Tipperary	2–7		David O'Leary
1953–54	Tipperary	3–10	Kilkenny	1–4		Jimmy Finn
1954–55	Tipperary	3–5	Wexford	1–5		John Doyle
1955–56	Wexford	5–9	Tipperary	2–14		Jim English
1956–57	Tipperary	3–11	Kilkenny	2–7		
1957–58	Wexford	5–7	Limerick	4–8		
1958–59	Tipperary	0–15	Waterford	0–7		
1959–60	Tipperary	2–15	Cork	3–8		Tony Wall
1960–61	Tipperary	6–6	Waterford	4–9		Matt Hassett
1961–62	Kilkenny	1–16	Cork	1–8		Alfie Hickey
1962–63 (Replay)	Waterford	3-6; 3-10	New York	3-6; 1-10	Croke Park; Nowlan Park	John Meaney
1962–63 Home final	Waterford	2–15	Tipperary	4–7		John Meaney
1963–64	Tipperary	5–12	Wexford	1–4		
1964–65	Tipperary	3–14	Kilkenny	2–8		Jimmy Doyle
1965–66	Kilkenny	10–15	New York	2–15		Jim Lynch
1965–66 Home final	Kilkenny	0–9	Tipperary	0–7		Jim Lynch
1966–67	Wexford	3–10	Kilkenny	1–9		Jimmy O'Brien
1967–68	Tipperary	6–27	New York	4–22	Gaelic Park	Mick Roche
1967–68 Home final	Tipperary	3–9	Kilkenny	1–13		Mick Roche
1968–69	Cork	3–12	Wexford	1–14		Denis Murphy
1969–70	Cork	5–21	New York	6–16	Gaelic Park	Gerald McCarthy
1969–70 Home final	Cork	2–17	Limerick	0–7		Gerald McCarthy
1970–71	Limerick	3–12	Tipperary	3–11	Cork Athletic Grounds	Tony O'Brien
1971–72	Cork	3–14	Limerick	2–14	Gaelic Grounds	Frank Norberg
1972–73	Wexford	4–13	Limerick	3–7	Gaelic Grounds	John Quigley
1973–74	Cork	6–15	Limerick	1–12	Gaelic Grounds	John Horgan
1974–75	Galway	4–9	Tipperary	4–6	Gaelic Grounds	John Connolly
1975–76 (R)	Kilkenny	0–16; 6–14	Clare	2–10; 1–14	Semple Stadium; Semple Stadium	Phil 'Fan' Larkin
1976–77	Clare	2–8	Kilkenny	0–9	Semple Stadium	John McNamara
1977–78	Clare	3-10	Kilkenny	1-10	Semple Stadium	Seán Stack
1978–79	Tipperary	3–15	Galway	0–8	Gaelic Grounds	Paddy Williams
1979–80 (R)	Cork	2–10; 4–15	Limerick	2–10; 4–6	Páirc Uí Chaoimh; Páirc Uí Chaoimh	Dermot Mac Curtain
1980–81	Cork	3–11	Offaly	2–8	Semple Stadium	Dónal O'Grady
1981–82	Kilkenny	2–14	Wexford	1–11	Croke Park	Brian Cody
1982–83	Kilkenny	2–14	Limerick	2–12	Semple Stadium	Liam Fennelly
1983–84	Limerick	3–16	Wexford	1–9	Semple Stadium	Leonard Enright
1984–85	Limerick	3–12	Clare	1–7	Semple Stadium	Leonard Enright
1985–86	Kilkenny	2–10	Galway	2–6	Semple Stadium	Frank Holohan
1986–87	Galway	3–12	Clare	3–10	Semple Stadium	Conor Hayes
1987–88	Tipperary	3–15	Offaly	2–9	Croke Park	Pat O'Neill
1988–89	Galway	2–16	Tipperary	4–8	Croke Park	Conor Hayes
1989–90	Kilkenny	0–19	New York	0–9	Gaelic Park	Kevin Fennelly
1989–90 Home final	Kilkenny	3-12	Wexford	1-10	Croke Park	Kevin Fennelly
1990–91	Offaly	2–6	Wexford	0–10	Croke Park	Danny Owens
1991–92	Limerick	0–14	Tipperary	0–13	Gaelic Grounds	Joe O'Connor
1992–93 (Replay) (2nd replay)	Cork	2–11; 0–18; 3–11	Wexford	2–11; 3–9; 1–12	Semple Stadium; Semple Stadium; Semple Stadium	Brian Corcoran
1993–94	Tipperary	2–14	Galway	0–12	Gaelic Grounds	George Frend
1994–95	Kilkenny	2–12	Clare	0–9	Semple Stadium	Bill Hennessy
1995–96	Galway	2–10	Tipperary	2–8	Gaelic Grounds	Michael Coleman
1997	Limerick	1–12	Galway	1–9	Cusack Park	Gary Kirby
1998	Cork	2–14	Waterford	0–13	Semple Stadium	Diarmuid O'Sullivan
1999	Tipperary	1–14	Galway	1–10	Cusack Park	Tommy Dunne
2000	Galway	2–18	Tipperary	2–13	Gaelic Grounds	Joe Rabbitte
2001	Tipperary	1–19	Clare	0–17	Gaelic Grounds	Tommy Dunne
2002	Kilkenny	2–15	Cork	2–14	Semple Stadium	Andy Comerford
2003	Kilkenny	5–14	Tipperary	5–13	Croke Park	D.J. Carey
2004	Galway	2–15	Waterford	1–13	Gaelic Grounds	Ollie Canning
2005	Kilkenny	3–20	Clare	0–15	Semple Stadium	Peter Barry
2006	Kilkenny	3–11	Limerick	0–14	Semple Stadium	Jackie Tyrrell
2007	Waterford	0–20	Kilkenny	0–18	Semple Stadium	Michael 'Brick' Walsh
2008	Tipperary	3–18	Galway	3–16	Gaelic Grounds	Eoin Kelly
2009	Kilkenny	2–26	Tipperary	4–17	Semple Stadium	Henry Shefflin
2010	Galway	2–22	Cork	1–17	Semple Stadium	Shane Kavanagh
2011	Dublin	0–22	Kilkenny	1–07	Croke Park	John McCaffrey
2012	Kilkenny	3-21	Cork	0–16	Semple Stadium	Eoin Larkin
2013	Kilkenny	2-17	Tipperary	0–20	Nowlan Park	Colin Fennelly
2014	Kilkenny	2-25	Tipperary	1-27	Semple Stadium	Lester Ryan
2015	Waterford	1-24	Cork	0-17	Semple Stadium	Kevin Moran
2016	Clare	1-23	Waterford	2-19	Semple Stadium	Cian Dillon & Tony Kelly
2017	Galway	3-21	Tipperary	0-14	Gaelic Grounds	David Burke
2018	Kilkenny	2-23	Tipperary	2-17	Nowlan Park	Cillian Buckley
2019	Limerick	1-24	Waterford	0-19	Croke Park	Declan Hannon
2020	Limerick	0-36	Clare	1-23	Semple Stadium	Declan Hannon
2021	Galway and Kilkenny share title				N/A	Pádraic Mannion; Adrian Mullen
2022	Waterford	4-20	Cork	1-23	Semple Stadium	Conor Prunty
2023	Limerick	2-20	Kilkenny	0-15	Páirc Uí Chaoimh	Cian Lynch
2024	Clare	3-16	Kilkenny	1-20	Semple Stadium	Conor Cleary
2025	Cork	3-24	Tipperary	0-23	Páirc Uí Chaoimh	Robert Downey
2026	Limerick	1-27	Cork	1-21	Gaelic Grounds	Cian Lynch

=== Records and statistics ===
==== By decade ====
The most successful team of each decade, judged by number of National Hurling League titles, is as follows:

- 1920s: 1 each for Cork (1926), Tipperary (1928) and Dublin (1929)
- 1930s: 5 for Limerick (1934-35-36-37-38)
- 1940s: 3 for Cork (1940-41-48)
- 1950s: 6 for Tipperary (1950-52-54-55-57-59)
- 1960s: 5 for Tipperary (1960-61-64-65-68)
- 1970s: 3 for Cork (1970-72-74)
- 1980s: 3 for Kilkenny (1982-83-86)
- 1990s: 2 each for Kilkenny (1990–95), Limerick (1992–97), Cork (1993–98) and Tipperary (1994–99)
- 2000s: 5 for Kilkenny (2002-03-05-06-09)
- 2010s: 4 for Kilkenny (2012-13-14-18)
- 2020s: 3 for Limerick (2020–23-26)

==== Gaps ====
Top ten longest gaps between successive league titles:

- 72 years: Dublin (1939–2011)
- 44 years: Waterford (1963–2007)
- 38 years: Clare (1978–2016)
- 31 years: Clare (1946–1977)
- 29 years: Kilkenny (1933–1962)
- 27 years: Cork (1998–2025)
- 24 years: Galway (1951–1975)
- 24 years: Limerick (1947–1971)
- 22 years: Limerick (1997–2019)
- 21 years: Tipperary (1928–1949)

== Division 1B ==
=== History ===
Division 1B has existed in its current form since the 2025 league. Prior to this, Division 1B teams competed in Division 1 and Division 2A. The new division was created using the final rankings from the 2024 league.

=== Format ===
There are currently seven teams in Division 1B.

During the course of a season (from February to March) each team plays the others once (a single round-robin system) for a total of 21 games. Teams receive two points for a win and one point for a draw. No points are awarded for a loss. Where two teams are level on points, the team that wins the head-to-head match is ranked ahead. If this game is a draw, points difference (total scored minus total conceded in all games) is used to rank the teams. Where three or more teams are level on points, points difference is used to rank them. This is followed, if needed, by points scored, and then a play-off match.

The top two teams in Division 1B contest the final and are promoted to Division 1A. The bottom two teams in Division 1B are relegated to Division 2.

=== 2027 Teams ===
The following seven teams will compete in Division 1B during the 2027 league.

Team	Position in table in 2026	First year in Division 1B	In Division 1B since	Division 1B titles	Last Division 1B title
Antrim	5th	2012	2025	0	—
Kerry	Division 2 runners-up	2027	2027	0	—
Kildare	4th	2026	2026	0	—
Laois	Division 2 champions	2012	2027	0	—
Offaly	Division 1A relegated	2012	2027	0	—
Waterford	Division 1A relegated	2025	2027	1	2025
Wexford	3rd	2012	2026	0	—

=== List of finals ===
Year	Winners		Runners-up		Stadium	#
Year	County	Score	County	Score	Stadium	#
2026	Clare	2–26	Dublin	3–20	TUS Gaelic Grounds	
2025	Waterford	1–27	Offaly	2–20	Páirc Uí Chaoimh	
2013–2024	No Division					
2013	Dublin	1–16	Limerick	1–15	Semple Stadium	
2012	Clare	0–21	Limerick	1–16	Gaelic Grounds	

=== Roll of honour ===
#	County	Titles	Runners-up	Winning years	Losing years
1	Clare	2	0	2012, 2026	—
2	Dublin	1	1	2013	2026
2	Waterford	1	0	2025	—
4	Limerick	0	2	—	2012, 2013
4	Offaly	0	1	—	2025

== Division 2 ==
=== History ===
Division 2 has existed in its current form since the 2025 league. Prior to this, Division 2 teams competed in Division 2A and Division 2B. The new division was created using the final rankings from the 2024 league.

=== Format ===
There are currently seven teams in Division 2.

During the course of a season (from February to March) each team plays the others once (a single round-robin system) for a total of 21 games. Teams receive two points for a win and one point for a draw. No points are awarded for a loss. Where two teams are level on points, the team that wins the head-to-head match is ranked ahead. If this game is a draw, points difference (total scored minus total conceded in all games) is used to rank the teams. Where three or more teams are level on points, points difference is used to rank them.

The top two teams in Division 2 contest the final and are promoted to Division 1B. The bottom two teams in Division 2 are relegated to Division 3.

=== 2027 Teams ===
The following seven teams will compete in Division 2 during the 2027 league.

Team	Position in table in 2026	First year in Division 2	In Division 2 since	Most recent promotion	Most recent relegation	Division 2 titles	Last Division 2 title
Carlow	Division 1B relegated	1957–58	2027	2018	1992–93	7	2018
Donegal	Division 3 runners-up		2027	Never promoted	2025	0	—
Down	Division 1B Relegated	1955–56	2027	2025	2012	2	2025
London	5th		2026	Never promoted	2019	0	—
Meath	4th	1955–56	2012	2000	2022	4	2000
Westmeath	3rd	1957–58	2026	2022	1993–94	7	2022
Wicklow	Division 3 champions	1955–56	2027	1975-76	2021	4	1982

=== Roll of honour ===
#	County	Titles	Runners-up	Winning years
1	Kerry	9	12	1957, 1962, 1967, 1968, 1979, 1998, 2001, 2014, 2015
2	Laois	8	3	1960, 1965, 1993, 2002, 2007, 2013, 2024, 2026
3	Westmeath	7	10	1964, 1975, 1977, 2008, 2016, 2019, 2022
3	Carlow	7	8	1958, 1959, 1974, 1978, 1981, 2012, 2018
5	Offaly	6	5	1966, 1988, 2005, 2009, 2021, 2023
5	Antrim	6	4	1956, 1970, 1992, 2003, 2017, 2020
7	Meath	5	6	1949, 1963, 1972, 1973, 2000
8	Wicklow	4	2	1971, 1976, 1980, 1982
8	Clare	4	2	1926, 1985, 1990, 1994
10	Dublin	3	1	1989, 1997, 2006
10	Wexford	3	1	1986, 1996, 2010
12	Down	2	4	2004, 2025
12	Tipperary	2	0	1984, 1987
12	Limerick	2	0	1983, 2011
14	Kildare	1	2	1969
14	Waterford	1	2	1995
14	Galway	1	0	1991
	Derry	1	0	1999
19	Armagh	0	1	—
19	Kilkenny	0	1	—
19	Roscommon	0	1	—
19	Cork	0	2	—

=== Relegated teams ===
Year	Team	Ref.
2012	Down	
2013	Wicklow	
2014	Kildare	
2015	Wicklow	
2016	Derry	
2017	Armagh	
2018	Kildare	
2019	London	
2020	Mayo	
2021	Wicklow	
2022	Meath	
2023	Derry	

=== List of finals ===
Year	Winners		Runners-up		Stadium	Captain	#
Year	County	Score	County	Score	Stadium	Captain	#
Division 2
2026	Laois	3–18	Kerry	0–13	O'Moore Park		
2025	Down	4–22	Kildare	3–18	Inniskeen		
Division 2A
2024	Laois	2-22	Carlow	1-12			
2023	Offaly	0-24	Kildare	1-18			
2022	Westmeath	5–19	Down	1–17	FBD Semple Stadium	Killian Doyle	
2021	Offaly	10 pts	Carlow	6 pts	N / A	Ben Conneely	
2020	Antrim	2-23	Kerry	2-20	O'Connor Park	Conor McCann	
2019	Westmeath	0–12	Kerry	0–10	Cusack Park	Aonghus Clarke	
2018	Carlow	2–19	Westmeath	2–12	O'Moore Park	Eoin Nolan; Richard Coady	
2017	Antrim	2–12	Carlow	0–15	Páirc Esler	Simon McCrory	
2016	Westmeath	0–10	Carlow	0-08	O'Connor Park	Aonghus Clarke	
2015	Kerry	5–17	Westmeath	3–17	Gaelic Grounds	John Griffin	
2014	Kerry	3–16	Carlow	3–13	Semple Stadium	John Egan	
2013	Laois	3–14	Westmeath	1-09	O'Connor Park	Matthew Whelan	
2012	Carlow	1–14	Westmeath	0–12	Nowlan Park	Shane Kavanagh; Edward Coady	
Division 2
2011	Limerick	4–12	Clare	2–13	Cusack Park		
2010	Wexford	1–16	Clare	2-09	Semple Stadium		
2009	Offaly	1–13	Wexford	0–13	Semple Stadium		
2008	Westmeath	2–12	Carlow	0–12	Gaelic Grounds		
2007	Laois	2–19	Wicklow	0-08	Semple Stadium		
2006	Dublin	0–16	Kerry	1-06	Semple Stadium		
2005	Offaly	6-21	Carlow	4-07	Semple Stadium		
2004	Down	5–15	Westmeath	3-07	Gaelic Grounds		
2003	Antrim	3–18	Kerry	2–12	Croke Park		
2002	Laois	1-20	Antrim	2–14	Semple Stadium		
2001	Kerry	4–14	Westmeath	3–10	Croke Park		
2000	Meath	5–14	Carlow	2–10	Cusack Park		
1999	Derry	1–14	Wicklow	0–13	O'Moore Park		
1998	Kerry	1–11	Westmeath	2-06	MacDonagh Park		
1997	Dublin	14 pts	Cork	12 pts	N / A		
1995–96	Wexford	12 pts	Laois	10 pts	N / A		
1994–95	Waterford	12 pts	Offaly	10 pts	N / A		
1993–94	Clare	11 pts	Kilkenny	10 pts	N / A		
1992–93	Laois	14 pts	Kerry	12 pts	N / A		
1991–92	Antrim	14 pts	Meath	10 pts	N / A		
1990–91	Galway	14 pts	Down	10 pts	N / A		
1989–90	Clare	13 pts	Waterford	13 pts	N / A		
1988–89	Dublin	12 pts	Cork	12 pts	N / A		
1987–88	Offaly	14 pts	Antrim	10 pts	N / A		
1986–87	Tipperary	12 pts	Waterford	11 pts	N / A		
1985–86	Wexford	13 pts	Westmeath	12 pts	N / A		
1984–85	Clare	14 pts	Dublin	9 pts	N / A		
1983–84	Tipperary	12 pts	Offaly	12 pts	N / A		
1982–83	Limerick	14 pts	Laois	12 pts	N / A		
1981–82	Wicklow	12 pts	Meath	9 pts	N / A		
1980–81	Carlow	10 pts	Down	8 pts	N / A		
1979–80	Wicklow	2–14	Armagh	1–05			
1978–79	Kerry	8 pts	Westmeath	7 pts	N / A		
1977–78	Carlow	1–15	Kerry	1–07			
1976–77	Westmeath	10 pts	Kerry	8 pts	N / A		
1975–76	Wicklow	2–09	Down	0–07			
1974–75	Westmeath	7 pts	Kerry	6 pts	N / A		
1973–74	Carlow						
1972–73	Meath						
1971–72	Meath						
1970–71	Wicklow	8 pts	Meath	6 pts	N / A		
1969–70	Antrim	2–13	Kildare	3–08	Croke Park		
1968–69	Kildare	4–13	Westmeath	1–05	Croke Park		
1967–68	Kerry	2–11	Antrim	1–09	Croke Park		
1966–67	Kerry	4–08	Meath	3–08	Croke Park		
1965–66	Offaly	4–11	Kerry	3–09	Croke Park		
1964–65	Laois	3–14	Kerry	3–04	Croke Park		
1963–64	Westmeath	3–09	Laois	3–07	Croke Park		
1962–63	Meath						
1961–62	Kerry	3–08	Meath	1–02	Frank Sheehy Park		
1960-61							
1959–60	Laois	5–09	Roscommon	1–08			
1958–59	Carlow	2–11	Offaly	5–01			
1957–58	Carlow	3–07	Offaly	0–04			
1956–57	Kerry	6–01, 4–13	Meath	4–07, 3–06			
1955–56	Antrim	2–07, 4–14	Kerry	1–10, 5–04			
1950–1954							
1948–49	Meath	2–03	Antrim	2–01	Corrigan Park		
1927–1947							
1925–26	Clare	8 pts	Offaly	6 pts			

== Division 3 ==
=== History ===
Division 3 has existed in its current form since 2025. Prior to this, Division 3 had existed as 2 divisions of six teams each. The new division was created using the final rankings from the 2024 league.

=== Format ===
There are currently seven teams in Division 3.

During the course of a season (from January to March) each team plays the others once (a single round-robin system) for a total of 21 games. Teams receive two points for a win and one point for a draw. No points are awarded for a loss. Where two teams are level on points, the team that wins the head-to-head match is ranked ahead. If this game is a draw, points difference (total scored minus total conceded in all games) is used to rank the teams. Where three or more teams are level on points, points difference is used to rank them.

The top two teams in Division 3 contest the final and are promoted to Division 2 the following season.

The bottom two teams in Division 3 are relegated to Division 4 the following season. Their place in the division is then taken by the Division 4 champions and runners-up, who gain automatic promotion.

=== 2027 Teams ===
The following seven teams will compete in Division 3 during the 2027 league.

Team	Position in table in 2026	First year in Division 3	In Division 3 since	Most recent promotion	Most recent relegation	Division 3 titles	Last Division 3 title
Derry	6th (Division 2)		2027	2011	Never relegated	0	—
Longford	Division 4 runners-up		2027	2002	2009	1	2002
Louth	5th	1991–92	2026	2000	2024	2	2008
Mayo	7th (Division 2)		2027	2025	1993–94	6	2025
Roscommon	3rd	1992–93	2025	2023	Never relegated	6	2023
Sligo	Division 4 champions		2027	2021	2025	2	2021
Tyrone	4th	1991–92	2026	2022	2010	2	2022

=== Roll of honour ===
#	County	Titles	Winning years
1	Roscommon	6	1984, 1993, 2007, 2016, 2019, 2023
1	Mayo	6	1980, 1986, 1998, 2003, 2024, 2025
3	Donegal	5	2001, 2005, 2014, 2017, 2020
4	Kildare	3	1983, 1992, 2009
4	Wicklow	3	1991, 2011, 2026
6	Meath	2	1985, 1988
6	Down	2	1987, 1989
6	Armagh	2	1999, 2006
6	Louth	2	2000, 2008
6	Kerry	2	1990, 2010
6	Fingal	2	2012, 2013
6	Sligo	2	2004, 2021
6	Tyrone	2	2015, 2022
14	Carlow	1	1994
14	Westmeath	1	1995
14	London	1	1996
14	Longford	1	2002
14	Warwickshire	1	2018

=== List of finals ===
Year	Winners		Runners-up		Stadium	Ref.
Year	County	Score	County	Score	Stadium	Ref.
Division 3
2026	Wicklow	3–16	Donegal	2–18	Aughrim County Ground	
2025	Mayo	0–14	London	1–08	Manguard Park	
Division 3A
2024	Mayo	3-19	Sligo	3-16		
2023	Roscommon	2-17	Armagh	0-15		
2022	Tyrone	2-21	Armagh	2-19		
2021	Sligo	8 pts	Armagh	6 pts	N/A	
2020	Donegal	1-18	Armagh	0-19		
2019	Roscommon	0-14	Armagh	0-11		
2018	Warwickshire	0-20	Louth	1–14	St. Loman's Park	
2017	Donegal	4-25	Tyrone	1–12	Celtic Park	
2016	Roscommon	4–15	Monaghan	0-07	Fr. Tierney Park	
2015	Tyrone	0–18	Monaghan	1–11	Keady	
2014	Donegal	4–12	Roscommon	2–14	Markievicz Park	
2013	Fingal	1-09	Donegal	1-05	Breffni Park	
2012	Fingal	w/o	Monaghan	scr.	N/A	
2011	Wicklow	2-20	Derry	3–14	Pearse Park	
2010	Kerry	2–18	Derry	1–15	Woodmount	
2009	Kildare	2–18	Meath	1–18	Parnell Park	
Division 3
2008	Louth	1–16	Donegal	0–11	Roosky	
2007	Roscommon	1–13	Sligo	0–15	Kingspan Breffni Park	
2006	Armagh	3–10	Longford	1–11	Kingspan Breffni Park	
2005	Donegal	1–14	Mayo	2–10	Markievicz Park	
2004	Sligo	3–12	Tyrone	1-08	Fr. Tierney Park	
2003	Mayo	2–11	Sligo	2-06	MacHale Park	
2002	Longford	1–12	Louth	0–12	Páirc Tailteann	
2001	Donegal	3–13	Fermanagh	2–10	Kingspan Breffni Park	
2000	Louth	0–16	Longford	1–11	Cusack Park	
1999	Armagh	0–13	Mayo	1-06	Leo Casey Park	
1998	Mayo	2–12	Cavan	1-08		
1997						
1995-96	London		Kildare			
1994-95	Westmeath		London			
1993-94	Carlow		Roscommon			
1992-93	Roscommon	0-08, w/o	Mayo	0-08, scr		
1991-92	Kildare	0-09	Monaghan	0-07		
1990-91	Wicklow					
1989-90	Kerry		Derry			
1988-89	Down		Carlow			
1987-88	Meath		Derry			
1986-87	Down		Roscommon			
1985-86	Mayo		Waterford			
1984-85	Meath		Down			
1983-84	Roscommon		Down			
1982-83	Kildare		Meath			
1980–1982	No Division					
1979-80	Mayo	2–13	Monaghan	0–07		

=== Relegated teams ===
Year	County	#
2009	Wicklow	
2010	Mayo	
2011	Armagh	
2012	Sligo	
2013	Tyrone	
2014	Longford	
2015	Fermanagh	
2016	Warwickshire	
2017	—	
2018	Longford	
2019	Lancashire	
2020	Louth	
2021	Longford	
2022	Warwickshire	
2023	Fermanagh	

== Division 4 ==
=== 2027 Teams ===
The following seven teams will compete in Division 4 during the 2027 league.

Team	Position in table in 2026	Most recent promotion	First year in Division 4	In Division 4 since	Division 4 titles	Last Division 4 title
Armagh	6th (Division 3)	Never promoted	2027	2027	0	—
Cavan	4th	2011	1982–83	2026	1	1982–83
Fermanagh	7th (Division 3)	2025	1982–83	2027	1	1994–95
Lancashire	7th	Never promoted	2025	2025	0	—
Leitrim	3rd	2011	1982–83	2025	0	—
Monaghan	6th	2010	1983–84	2025	4	2010
Warwickshire	5th	Never promoted	2025	2025	0	—

=== List of finals ===
Year	Winners		Runners-up		Stadium	#
Year	County	Score	County	Score	Stadium	#
2026	Sligo	2–21	Longford	4–12	Markievicz Park	
2025	Louth	0–16	Fermanagh	1–08	St Mellan's Park	
2012–2024	No Division					
2011	Tyrone	1–15	South Down	0–11	Athletic Grounds	
2010	Monaghan	1–18	Longford	1–10	Kingspan Breffni Park	
2009	Sligo	1–13	Monaghan	2-08	Pearse Park	
2008	Monaghan	1-27	South Down	5–14	Kingspan Breffni Park	
1997–2007	No Division					
1995–96	Donegal					
1994–95	Fermanagh					
1993–94	Louth	12 pts	Fermanagh	10 pts	N / A	
1992	No Division					
1990–91	Mayo					
1989–90	Sligo	13 pts	Fermanagh	11 pts	N / A	
1988–89	Monaghan	4–07	Louth	1–09		
1987–88	Longford	2–09 (R)	Monaghan	2–07		
1986–87	Tyrone	2–05	Leitrim	1–06		
1985–86	Monaghan		Longford			
1984–85	Louth		Sligo			
1983–84	Longford					
1982–83	Cavan		Fermanagh			

=== Roll of honour ===
County	Titles	Runners-up	Years won	Years runners-up
Monaghan	4	1	1986, 1989, 2008, 2010	2009
Louth	3	1	1985, 1994, 2025	1989
Sligo	3	1	1990, 2009, 2026	1985
Tyrone	2	0	1987, 2011	—
Fermanagh	1	4	1995	1983, 1990, 1994, 2025
Longford	1	3	1984	1986, 2010, 2026
Cavan	1	0	1983	—
Mayo	1	0	1991	—
Donegal	1	0	1996	—
South Down	0	2	—	2008, 2011
Leitrim	0	1	—	1987

== Former Divisions ==
=== Division 2B ===
==== List of finals ====
Year	Winners		Runners-up		Stadium	Ref.
Year	County	Score	County	Score	Stadium	Ref.
2023	Meath	0-20	Donegal	0-14		
2022	Derry	1-23	Sligo	2-15		
2021	Kildare	8 pts	Derry	4 pts		
2020	Down	2-16	Derry	0-17		
2019	Wicklow	1-09	Derry	0-08		
2018	Mayo	1-15	Down	0-14	Kingspan Breffni Park	
2017	Meath	4-24	Wicklow	2-15	Parnell Park	
2016	Armagh	0-20	Down	1-15	St. Brigid's Park	
2015	Kildare	0-22	Meath	0-17	Cusack Park	
2014	Wicklow	0-23	Down	1-18	Páirc Tailteann	
2013	London	1-16	Meath	1-14	St. Conleth's Park	
2012	Kildare	3-13	Meath	1-12	Parnell Park	

==== Roll of Honour ====
#	County	Titles	Runners-up	Years won	Years runners-up
1	Kildare	3	0	2012, 2015, 2021	-
2	Meath	2	3	2017, 2023	2012, 2013, 2015
2	Wicklow	2	1	2014, 2019	2017
4	Down	1	3	2020	2014, 2016, 2018
4	Derry	1	3	2022	2019, 2020, 2021
4	London	1	0	2013	-
4	Armagh	1	0	2016	-
4	Mayo	1	0	2018	-
9	Sligo	0	1	-	2022
9	Donegal	0	1	-	2023

==== Relegated teams ====
Year	Team	Ref.
2013	Roscommon	
2014	Fingal	
2015	-	
2016	Donegal	
2017	Roscommon	
2018	Armagh	
2019	Donegal	
2020	Warwickshire	
2021	Roscommon	
2022	Mayo	
2023	Sligo	

=== Division 3B ===
==== Roll of Honour ====
#	County	Titles	Runners-up	Years won	Years runners-up
1	Longford	3	3	2013, 2017, 2019	2015, 2016, 2022
1	Fermanagh	3	0	2012, 2016, 2022	-
3	Warwickshire	1	2	2015	2012, 2017
3	Sligo	1	2	2020	2013, 2019
3	Roscommon	1	1	2011	2009
3	Louth	1	1	2021	2010
3	Cavan	1	1	2023	2021
3	London	1	0	2009	-
3	Wicklow	1	0	2010	-
3	Tyrone	1	0	2014	-
3	Lancashire	1	0	2018	-
12	Leitrim	0	4	-	2014, 2018, 2020, 2023
12	Mayo	0	1	-	2011

==== List of finals ====
Year	Winners		Runners-up		Stadium	Ref.
Year	County	Score	County	Score	Stadium	Ref.
2023	Cavan	0-17	Leitrim	0-16	National Games Development Centre	
2022	Fermanagh	2-18	Longford	1-17	Avant Money Pairc Sean Mac Diarmada	
2021	Louth	6 pts	Cavan	3 pts	N/A	
2020	Sligo	3-17	Leitrim	2-16	Connacht Centre of Excellence	
2019	Longford	2-15	Sligo	3-10	Connacht GAA Centre of Excellence	
2018	Lancashire	1-25	Leitrim	1-18	First Ulsters Park	
2017	Longford	4-19	Warwickshire	3-20	Páirc Naomh Colmcille	
2016	Fermanagh	2-13	Longford	3-08	Markievicz Park	
2015	Warwickshire	1-15	Longford	2-10	Killegland West	
2014	Tyrone	0-13	Leitrim	1-09	Markievicz Park	
2013	Longford	1-08	Sligo	0-09	Páirc Seán Mac Diarmada	
2012	Fermanagh	2-15	Warwickshire	2-05	Parnell Park	
2011	Roscommon	0-17	Mayo	1-12	Páirc Seán Mac Diarmada	
2010	Wicklow	3-18	Louth	2-09	Parnell Park	
2009	London	2-19	Roscommon	2-13	Pearse Park	

=== Division 3 Shield ===
Year	Winners	Score	Runners-up	Score	Stadium	Ref.
2004	Donegal	4-14	Cavan	2-06	Brewster Park	
2005	Fermanagh	0-15	Longford	1-05	Kingspan Breffni Park	
2006	Tyrone	3-09	Sligo	0-10	Kingspan Breffni Park	
2007	Fermanagh	1-11	Leitrim	1-10	Markievicz Park	

== Player records ==
=== Players with most league wins ===
Rank	Player	Team	Era	Wins	Finals
1	John Doyle	Tipperary	1948-1967	10	1949-50, 1951-52, 1953-54, 1954-55, 1956-57, 1958-59, 1959-60, 1960-61, 1963-64, 1964-65
2	Michael Maher	Tipperary	1951-1966	8	1951-52, 1954-55, 1956-57, 1958-59, 1959-60, 1960-61, 1963-64, 1964-65
2	Theo English	Tipperary	1953-1967	8	1953–54, 1954–55, 1956–57, 1958–59, 1959–60, 1960–61, 1963–64, 1964–65
2	J. J. Delaney	Kilkenny	2001-2014	8	2002, 2003, 2005, 2006, 2009, 2012, 2013, 2014
5	Mickey Byrne	Tipperary	1945-1960	7	1948-49, 1949-50, 1953-54, 1954-55, 1956-57, 1958-59, 1959-60
5	Jimmy Doyle	Tipperary	1957-1973	7	1956–57, 1958–59, 1959–60, 1960–61, 1963–64, 1964–65, 1967–68
7	Pat Stakelum	Tipperary	1947-1957	6	1948–49, 1949–50, 1951–52, 1953–54, 1954–55, 1956–57
7	Liam Devaney	Tipperary	1954-1968	6	1954–55, 1956–57, 1958–59, 1959–60, 1960–61, 1964–65
7	Tony Wall	Tipperary	1953-1967	6	1956–57, 1958–59, 1959–60, 1960–61, 1963–64, 1964–65
7	Donie Nealon	Tipperary	1958-1969	6	1958–59, 1959–60, 1960–61, 1963–64, 1964–65, 1967–68
7	Henry Shefflin	Kilkenny	1999-2014	6	2002, 2003, 2005, 2006, 2009, 2014
7	Tommy Walsh	Kilkenny	2002-2014	6	2003, 2005, 2006, 2009, 2012, 2013
7	Eoin Larkin	Kilkenny	2005-2016	6	2005, 2006, 2009, 2012, 2013, 2014
7	Jackie Tyrrell	Kilkenny	2003-2016	6	2005, 2006, 2009, 2012, 2013, 2014

== Broadcasting rights ==
Setanta Sports broadcasts live matches in Australia. Setanta Sports also provides matches from the National Hurling League in Asia. In Ireland TG4 shows live matches each week on Sunday afternoon, with deferred coverage of a second match shown straight after. Setanta Sports broadcasts matches live on the Saturday evening slot. Highlights for all the games are shown at 7:00pm on League Sunday on RTÉ2.

== See also ==
- List of National Hurling League winning teams
- National Camogie League
- National Football League
