= 1932–33 National Hurling League =

Sixth season of the National Hurling League

League details
- Dates: 18 September 1932 – 9 April 1933
- Teams: 10

League champions
- Winners: Kilkenny (1st win)

The 1932–33 National Hurling League was the sixth season of the National Hurling League.

== Format ==
The ten participating teams were Clare, Cork, Dublin, Galway, Kilkenny, Laois, Limerick, Offaly, Tipperary and Waterford who were divided into two divisions and agreed to play a four-game format whereby each team would play each of their five rivals once with two points awarded for a win and one point awarded for a drawn game. The two teams with the most points in each division at the completion of the season would play a final to decide the National Hurling League champions.

== National Hurling League ==
National Hurling League
- Season: 1932-33
- Champions: Kilkenny; 1st National League title Captain: Eddie Doyle
- Matches played: 22
- Biggest home win: Tipperary 8-8 - 2-0 Offaly (20 November 1932)
- Biggest away win: Cork 7-5 - 1-2 Laois (4 December 1932)
- Highest scoring: Galway 0-30 - 0-13 Offaly (18 September 1932)
- All statistics correct as of 18 April 2017.

Galway came into the season as defending champions of the 1930-31 season.

On 9 April 1933, Kilkenny won the title after a 3-8 to 1-3 win over Limerick in the final. It was their first league title.

=== Eastern Division table ===
Pos	Team	Pld	W	D	L	Pts	Notes
1	Kilkenny	4	4	0	0	8	National League winners
2	Cork	4	3	0	1	6	
3	Dublin	4	2	0	2	4	
4	Laois	4	1	0	3	2	
5	Waterford	4	0	0	4	0	

=== Group stage results ===
9 October 1932	Cork	4-3 - 0-3	Dublin	Cork Athletic Grounds, Cork

16 October 1932	Laois	3-2 - 4-3	Kilkenny	O'Moore Park, Portlaoise

23 October 1932	Waterford	4-3 - 5-5	Laois	Waterford

6 November 1932	Kilkenny	2-5 - 2-2	Cork	Nowlan Park, Kilkenny

20 November 1932	Dublin	0-2 - 4-3	Kilkenny	Croke Park, Dublin

20 November 1932	Cork	4-6 - 1-4	Waterford	Cork Athletic Grounds, Cork

4 December 1932	Waterford	1-6 - 3-4	Dublin	Waterford

4 December 1932	Laois	1-2 - 7-5	Cork	O'Moore Park, Portlaoise

5 March 1933	Kilkenny	4-3 - 0-2	Waterford	Nowlan Park, Kilkenny

Dublin	7-3 - 2-1	Laois

=== Western Division table ===
Pos	Team	Pld	W	D	L	Pts	Notes
1	Limerick	4	3	0	1	6	National League runners-up
2	Tipperary	4	3	0	1	6	
3	Galway	4	2	0	2	4	
4	Clare	4	2	0	2	4	
5	Offaly	4	0	0	4	0	

=== Group stage results ===
18 September 1932	Galway	0-30 - 0-13	Offaly	Galway

9 October 1932	Tipperary	4-3 - 5-1	Limerick	Thurles Sportsfield, Thurles

23 October 1932	Offaly	1-2 - 4-3	Clare	Tullamore

30 October 1932	Galway	4-2 - 3-3	Limerick	Tuam

6 November 1932	Clare	3-1 - 5-4	Tipperary	Ennis

20 November 1932	Tipperary	8-8 - 2-0	Offaly	Templemore

20 November 1932	Clare	4-5 - 2-8	Galway	Ennis

Limerick	7-2 - 3-3	Offaly

4 December 1932	Galway	2-6 - 5-5	Tipperary	Loughrea

4 December 1932	Limerick	4-4 - 2-2	Clare	Markets Field, Limerick

=== Play-off ===
5 March 1933 Play-off	Limerick	3-2 - 1-1	Tipperary	Markets Field, Limerick

=== Knock-out stage ===
Final

9 April 1933 Final	Kilkenny	3-8 - 1-3	Limerick	Nowlan Park, Kilkenny
