= 1950–51 National Hurling League =

20th season of the National Hurling League

League details
- Dates: 15 October 1950 – 30 September 1951
- Teams: 18

League champions
- Winners: Galway (2nd win)

The 1950–51 National Hurling League was the 20th season of the National Hurling League.

== National Hurling League ==
National Hurling League
- Season: 1950-51
- Champions: Galway; 2nd National League title Captain: M. J. Flaherty
- All statistics correct as of 19 March 2017.

Tipperary came into the season as defending champions of the 1949-50 season.

On 30 September 1951, Galway won the title after a 2-11 to 2-8 win over New York in the final. It was their 2nd league title overall and their first since 1930-31.

=== Group A table ===
Pos	Team	Pld	W	D	L	Pts	Notes
1	Galway	4	3	1	0	7	National League champions
2	Clare	4	2	1	1	5	
3	Kilkenny	4	1	1	2	3	
4	Limerick	4	1	1	2	3	
5	Cork	4	1	0	3	2	

=== Group B table ===
Pos	Team	Pld	W	D	L	Pts	Notes
1	Wexford	4	4	0	0	8	
2	Tipperary	4	3	0	1	6	
3	Waterford	4	1	1	2	3	
4	Dublin	4	1	1	2	3	
5	Laois	4	0	0	4	0	

=== Group C table ===
Pos	Team	Pld	W	D	L	Pts	Notes
1	Offaly	3	3	0	0	6	
2	Westmeath	3	2	0	1	4	
3	Wicklow	3	1	0	2	2	
4	Roscommon	3	0	0	3	0	

=== Group D table ===
Pos	Team	Pld	W	D	L	Pts	Notes
1	Meath	3	3	0	0	6	
2	Antrim	3	1	1	1	3	
3	Tyrone	3	1	0	2	2	
4	Armagh	3	0	1	2	1	

=== Knock-out stage ===
Semi-finals

8 April 1951 Semi-Final	Meath	2-1 - 6-4	Wexford	St. Loman's Park, Trim

8 April 1951 Semi-Final	Offaly	0-4 - 5-14	Galway	St. Brendan's Park, Birr

Home final

22 April 1951 Home Final	Galway	6-7 - 3-4	Wexford	Croke Park, Dublin

Final

30 September 1951 Final	New York	2-8 - 2-11	Galway	Polo Grounds, New York City
				Attendance: 45,000
