= 1928–29 National Hurling League =

Third season of the National Hurling League

League details
- Dates: 21 October 1928 – 8 December 1929
- Teams: 12

League champions
- Winners: Dublin (1st win)
- Captain: Mick Gill

League runners-up
- Runners-up: Cork
- Captain: Dinny Barry-Murphy

The 1928–29 National Hurling League was the third edition of the National Hurling League, which ran from 21 October 1928 to 8 December 1929.

The twelve participating teams were Clare, Cork, Dublin, Galway, Kerry, Laois, Limerick, Meath, Offaly, Tipperary, Waterford and Wexford who were divided into an Eastern Division and a Southwestern Division. Each team played each of their rivals once with two points awarded for a win and one point awarded for a drawn game. The two teams who finished top of their respective divisions would play a final, with the winners being declared National Hurling League champions.

Dublin defeated Cork by 7-4 to 1-5 in the final.

== National Hurling League ==
=== Eastern Division ===
| Pos | Team | Pld | W | D | L | Pts | Notes |
|---|---|---|---|---|---|---|---|
| 1 | Dublin | 4 | 4 | 0 | 0 | 8 | National Hurling League champions |
| 2 | Offaly | 4 | 3 | 0 | 1 | 6 | |
| 3 | Laois | 4 | 2 | 0 | 2 | 4 | |
| 4 | Meath | 4 | 1 | 0 | 3 | 2 | |
| 5 | Wexford | 4 | 0 | 0 | 4 | 0 | |

=== Southwestern Division ===
| Pos | Team | Pld | W | D | L | Pts | Notes |
|---|---|---|---|---|---|---|---|
| 1 | Cork | 6 | 5 | 0 | 1 | 10 | National Hurling League runners-up |
| 2 | Tipperary | 5 | 4 | 0 | 1 | 8 | |
| 3 | Limerick | 3 | 2 | 0 | 1 | 4 | |
| 4 | Waterford | 5 | 2 | 0 | 3 | 4 | |
| 5 | Kerry | 5 | 1 | 0 | 4 | 2 | |
| 6 | Galway | 5 | 1 | 0 | 4 | 2 | |
| 7 | Clare | 3 | 0 | 0 | 2 | 0 | |

=== Results ===
| 13 October 1929 SW semi-final | Cork | 4-7 - 3-1 | Limerick | Cork Athletic Grounds |
| | | Report | | Attendance: 4,000 |

| 24 November 1929 SW final | Tipperary | 3-3 - 5-4 | Cork | Thurles Sportsfield |
| | | Report | | Referee: W Walsh |

| 8 December 1929 NHL final | Cork | 5-5 - 7-4 | Dublin | Thurles Sportsfield |
| | | Report | | Referee: S Robbins (Offaly) |
