= 1936–37 National Hurling League =

Tenth season of the National Hurling League

League details
- Dates: 4 October 1936 – 18 April 1937
- Teams: 9

League champions
- Winners: Limerick (4th win)
- Captain: Mick Mackey

League runners-up
- Runners-up: Tipperary

The 1936–37 National Hurling League was the tenth edition of the National Hurling League, which ran from 4 October 1936 until 18 April 1937.

The nine participating teams were Clare, Cork, Dublin, Galway, Kilkenny, Laois, Limerick, Tipperary and Waterford who agreed to play an eight game format whereby each team would play each of their eight rivals once with two points awarded for a win and one point awarded for a drawn game. The team with most points at the completion of the season would be declared National Hurling League champions.

Limerick completed their eight game programme with just one defeat and were declared the champions for the fourth successive year while Clare finished with the fewest points, however, they were not relegated the following season.

== National Hurling League ==
=== Table ===
Pos	Team	Pld	W	D	L	Pts	Notes
1	Limerick	8	6	1	1	13	National League champions
2	Tipperary	8	6	0	2	12	National League runners-up
3	Dublin	8	4	1	3	9	
4	Cork	8	4	1	3	9	
5	Waterford	8	4	0	4	8	
6	Kilkenny	8	3	1	4	7	
7	Galway	8	2	1	5	5	
8	Laois	7	2	0	5	4	
9	Clare	7	1	1	5	3	

=== Results ===
4 October 1936 Round I	Dublin	4-5 - 4-4	Waterford	Croke Park, Dublin

4 October 1936 Round I	Clare	2-2 - 3-2	Tipperary	Cusack Park, Ennis

4 October 1936 Round I	Kilkenny	7-6 - 5-1	Galway	Nowlan Park, Kilkenny

4 October 1936 Round I	Cork	6-2 - 2-1	Laois	Athletic Grounds, Cork

18 October 1936 Round II	Tipperary	2-5 - 2-2	Dublin	Thurles Sportsfield

18 October 1936 Round II	Laois	2-4 - 7-1	Limerick	O'Moore Park, Portlaoise

18 October 1936 Round II	Waterford	4-2 - 2-1	Clare	Lismore

18 October 1936 Round II	Galway	5-3 - 4-2	Clare	Pearse Park, Galway

1 November 1936 Round III	Dublin	3-7 - 1-2	Galway	Croke Park, Dublin

1 November 1936 Round III	Limerick	4-3 - 2-3	Waterford	Markets Field, Limerick

1 November 1936 Round III	Cork	9-5 - 5-3	Tipperary	Athletic Grounds, Cork

1 November 1936 Round III	Clare	7-4 - 5-1	Kilkenny	Cusack Park, Ennis

15 November 1936 Round IV	Kilkenny	7-4 - 7-4	Dublin	Nowlan Park, Kilkenny

15 November 1936 Round IV	Tipperary	4-5 - 2-4	Limerick	Thurles Sportsfield

15 November 1936 Round IV	Waterford	4-2 - 4-4	Laois	The Sportsfield, Waterford

15 November 1936 Round IV	Galway	4-5 - 4-5	Cork	Pearse Park, Galway

29 November 1936 Round V	Limerick	8-4 - 0-3	Galway	Markets Field, Limerick

29 November 1936 Round V	Laois	6-1 - 4-3	Tipperary	O'Moore Park, Portlaoise

29 November 1936 Round V	Cork	6-5- 2-2	Kilkenny	Athletic Grounds, Cork

29 November 1936 Round V	Dublin	3-7 - 3-1	Clare	Croke Park, Dublin

7 February 1937 Round VI	Tipperary	7-2 - 5-0	Waterford	Clonmel

7 February 1937 Round VI	Kilkenny	4-1 - 6-3	Limerick	Nowlan Park, Kilkenny

7 February 1937 Round VI	Galway	4-1 - 1-4	Laois	Portumna

7 February 1937 Round VI	Clare	1-2 - 6-4	Cork	Kilkishen

28 February 1937 Round VII	Dublin	5-3 - 4-3	Cork	Croke Park, Dublin

21 March 1937 Round VII	Laois	3-4 - 4-2	Kilkenny	O'Moore Park, Portlaois

21 March 1937 Round VII	Limerick	3-2 - 3-2	Clare	Markets Field, Limerick

21 March 1937 Round VII	Waterford	2-5 - 1-2	Galway	Fraher Field, Dungarvan

4 April 1937 Round VIII	Dublin	0-6 - 4-4	Limerick	Croke Park, Dublin

4 April 1937 Round VIII	Kilkenny	5-3 - 2-1	Waterford	Nowlan Park, Kilkenny

4 April 1937 Round VIII	Clare	5-5 - 2-1	Laois	Cusack Park, Ennis

11 April 1937 Round VIII	Galway	1-1 - 10-1	Tipperary	Portumna

18 April 1937 Round IX	Limerick	11-5 - 5-1	Cork	Markets Field, Limerick

18 April 1937 Round IX	Laois	0-2 - 7-8	Dublin	O'Moore Park, Portlaoise

18 April 1937 Round IX	Waterford	3-8 - 3-4	Clare	Cappoquin

18 April 1937 Round IX	Tipperary	2-7 - 3-2	Kilkenny	Carrick-on-Suir
