= 1959–60 National Hurling League =

29th season of the National Hurling League

League details
- Dates: 11 October 1959 – 1 May 1960

League champions
- Winners: Tipperary (9 win)

The 1959–60 National Hurling League was the 29th season of the National Hurling League.

== Division 1 ==
National Hurling League Division 1
- Season: 1959-60
- Champions: Tipperary; 9th National League title Captain: Tony Wall
- Top goalscorer: Christy Ring (12-09)
- All statistics correct as of 26 February 2017.

Tipperary came into the season as defending champions of the 1958-59 season. Carlow entered Division 1 as the promoted team.

On 1 May 1960, Tipperary won the title after a 2-15 to 3-8 win over Cork in the final. It was their second league title in succession and their 9th league title overall.

Cork's Christy Ring was the league's top scorer with 12-09.

=== Division 1A table ===
Pos	Team	Pld	W	D	L	Pts	Notes
1	Cork	5	4	0	1	8	National League runners-up
2	Kilkenny	5	3	1	1	7	
3	Dublin	5	3	0	2	6	
4	Waterford	5	2	1	2	5	
5	Wexford	5	2	0	3	4	
6	Antrim	5	0	0	5	0	

=== Group stage ===
11 October 1959	Cork	3-07 - 5-07	Kilkenny	Cork Athletic Grounds, Cork
	C Ring 2-1, C Cooney 1-0, P Barry 0-2, E Goulding 0-2, P Fitzgerald 0-1, P Leary 0-1.		E Keher 3-2, L Cleere 1-1, M Kelly 1-0, T O'Connell 0-2, D Heaslip 0-1, M Fleming 0-1.

11 October 1959	Waterford	6-10 - 2-07	Wexford	Waterford Sportsfield, Waterford
	D Whelan 2-1, F Walsh 0-7, T Cunningham 1-0, J Meaney 1-0, S Power 1-0, L Guinan 1-0, T Cheasty 0-2.		P Kehoe 1-3, O McGrath 1-0, O Gough 0-2, T Flood 0-1, J Colfer 0-1.	Referee: M Walsh (Cork)

11 October 1959	Antrim	4-02 - 9-07	Dublin	Casement Park, Belfast
	P Mullaney 1-2, A Forsythe 1-0, O Campbell 1-0, P McMahon 1-0.		J Lenihan 2-1, J Boothman 2-1, J Byrne 1-3, P Kenny 1-1, L Quinn 1-0, L Shannon 1-0, E O'Dea 1-0, F Whelan 0-1.

25 October 1959	Kilkenny	4-06 - 4-06	Waterford	Nowlan Park, Kilkenny
	D Whelan 2-0, L Guinan 1-0, T Cunningham 1-0, J Kiely 0-3, S Power 0-2, F Walsh 0-1.		B Dwyer 2-0, D Heaslip 1-1, T O'Connell 1-0, S Clohessy 0-3, E Keher 0-2.	Referee: S O'Dwyer (Tipperary)

25 October 1959	Antrim	1-03 - 6-06	Cork	Casement Park, Belfast
	P McMahon 1-0, P Mullaney 0-3.		J Donoghue 4-0, V Barrett 1-0, J O'Connor 1-0, D O'Driscoll 0-2, C Cooney 0-1, B O'Neill 0-1, P Fitzgerald 0-1, N Gallagher 0-1,

25 October 1959	Wexford	5-06 - 4-04	Dublin	Gorey
	J Colfer 2-0, P Kehoe 1-3, J O'Brien 1-0, O McGrath 1-0, R Murphy 0-3.		N O'Dea 2-0, J Byrne 1-1, L Shannon 1-1, F Whelan 0-1, B Boothman 0-1.

8 November 1959	Cork	7-09 - 5-04	Wexford	Cork Athletic Grounds, Cork
	C Ring 6-4, M Quane 1-1, D Driscoll 0-2, C Cooney 0-1, E Goulding 0-1.		P Kehoe 2-1, J O'Brien 1-1, O McGrath 1-0, O Gough 1-0, R Murphy 0-1, N Wheeler 0-1.	Referee: S Gleeson (Limerick)

8 November 1959	Dublin	3-10 - 1-09	Waterford	Croke Park, Dublin
	L Shannon 1-5, J Byrne 1-1, K McLoughlin 1-1, F Whelan 0-3.		F Walsh 0-7, L Guinan 1-0, T Cheasty 0-1, M Flannelly 0-1.

8 November 1959	Antrim	0-03 - 6-05	Kilkenny	Fr. Healy Park, Loughguile
	S Wright 0-2, P Mullaney 0-1.		T O'Connell 2-0, J Hennessy 2-0, J Murphy 1-1, M Fleming 1-0, S Clohessy 0-2, D Heaslip 0-1, E Keher 0-1.	Referee: P McGrattan (Down)

28 February 1960	Dublin	3-09 - 3-04	Kilkenny	Croke Park, Dublin
	J Finan 2-0, A Young 1-1, L Shannon 0-4, D Hayes 0-1, D Foley 0-1, J Byrne 0-1, K McLoughlin 0-1.		E Keher 2-2, D Carroll 1-1, S Clohessy 0-1.

28 February 1960	Waterford	5-03 - 6-06	Cork	Waterford Sportsfield, Waterford
	L Guinan 2-0, S Power 1-0, M Flannelly 1-0, D Whelan 1-0, T Cheasty 0-2, J Condon 0-1.		J Twomey 3-1, M Quane 1-0, J O'Flynn 1-0, C Ring 1-0, P Fitzgerald 0-3, E Goulding 0-1, P Barry 0-1.

28 February 1960	Wexford	5-10 - 5-04	Antrim	Gorey
	O McGrath 2-2, J Colfer 2-0, P Kehoe 1-0, M Lyng 0-3, M Bennett 0-3, J O'Brien 0-2.		R McMullan 2-0, O Campbell 1-2, P Mullaney 1-1, E Stewart 1-0, S Wright 0-1.	Referee: S Farrell (Wicklow)

3 April 1960	Cork	7-06 - 3-06	Dublin	Cork Athletic Grounds, Cork
	M Quane 3-2, P Barry 2-0, T Kelly 2-0, P Harte 0-3, P Fitzgerald 0-1.		D Foley 1-3, K McLoughlin 1-1, V Bell 1-0, H Doyle 0-2.	Referee: T O'Sullivan (Limerick)

3 April 1960	Kilkenny	4-07 - 2-07	Wexford	Nowlan Park, Kilkenny
	O Walsh 2-0, B Dwyer 1-1, S Clohessy 1-1, E Keher 0-3, D Carroll 0-1, P Kelly 0-1.		O McGrath 1-1, M Lyng 1-0, P Kehoe 0-2, M Bergin 0-1, J Kennedy 0-1, M Bennett 0-1, D Murphy 0-1.

3 April 1960	Antrim	1-02 - 7-07	Waterford	Casement Park, Belfast
	E Stuart 1-0, J McVeigh 0-1, D Kearney 0-1.		T Kennedy 2-2, D Whelan 2-0, F Walsh 1-2, M Flannelly 1-0, M Murphy 1-0, L Guinan 0-2, S Power 0-1.

=== Division 1B table ===
Pos	Team	Pld	W	D	L	Pts	Notes
1	Tipperary	4	4	0	0	8	National League champions
2	Limerick	4	2	1	1	5	
3	Carlow	4	1	0	3	2	
4	Galway	4	1	0	3	2	
5	Kerry	1	1	0	0	2	
6	Clare	3	0	0	3	0	

=== Group stage ===
11 October 1959	Galway	1-06 - 2-09	Tipperary	Pearse Stadium, Galway
	F Glynn 1-0, T Sweeney 0-3, M Regan 0-2, J Cahill 0-1.		T English 1-1, J Moloughney 1-0, J Doyle 0-2, P Dormey 0-2, T Wall 0-2, M Maher 0-1, J McCarthy 0-1.

11 October 1959	Carlow	5-05 - 10-06	Limerick	Dr. Cullen Park, Carlow
	E Long 3-1, L Walsh 1-1, W Walsh 1-0, J Fogarty 0-2, M Morrissey 0-1.		E Carey 3-0, P Hartnett 3-0, M Hayes 2-0, J McGrath 1-3, D McCarthy 1-0, P Cobbe 0-2, P O'Malley 0-1, S Quaid 0-1.

25 October 1959	Tipperary	4-07 - 1-09	Carlow	St. Cronan's Park, Roscrea
	J Doyle 3-1, J Williams 1-1, T Wall 0-3, G McCarthy 0-.		Long 1-0, Brophy 0-3, Walsh 0-2, Morrissey 0-1, Williams 0-1, Hayden 0-1, Hogan 0-1.

25 October 1959	Clare	4-05 - 7-11	Galway	Cusack Park, Ennis
	J Smith 2-0, N Jordan 1-1, G Ryan 1-0, C Madigan 0-2, M Lynch 0-1, M Deasy 0-1.		PJ Lawless 2-1, F Glynn 2-1, J Conroy 1-2, T Sweeney 0-5, P Egan 1-1, J Cormican 1-0, J Moclair 0-1.

8 November 1959	Clare	2-03 - 5-11	Tipperary	Cusack Park, Ennis
	J Smith 1-1, J Ryan 1-0, M Deasy 0-1, M Frost 0-1.		J Doyle 2-5, J McCarthy 2-2, T Moloughney 1-1, D Nealon 0-2, S Williams 0-1.

8 November 1959	Galway	4-03 - 3-06	Limerick	Duggan Park, Ballinasloe
	P Egan 2-1, J Conroy 2-1, T Sweeney 0-1.		D Kelly 1-5, P O'Malley 1-0, M Tynan 1-0, L Hogan 0-1.

29 November 1959	Kerry	3-04 - 2-04	Carlow	Austin Stack Park, Tralee
	E O'Sullivan 2-0, M Hennessy 1-1, T Hennessy 0-1, J Culloty 0-1, B Phelan 0-1.		M O'Brien 1-3, P Hynes 1-0, L Walsh 0-1.

14 February 1960	Limerick	4-09 - 2-00	Clare	FitzGerald Park, Kilmallock
	L Moloney 2-1, P Cobbe 1-1, P Hartnett 1-0, D Kelly 0-3, PJ Keane 0-2, S Hayes 0-1, L Hogan 0-1.		J Smyth 1-0, G Ryan 1-0.	Referee: J Gallagher (Galway)

28 February 1960	Carlow	5-07 - 4-09	Galway	Dr. Cullen Park, Carlow
	E Long 3-1, PJ Hogan 1-1, L Walsh 1-0, M O'Brien 0-1, P McGovern 0-1, T Nolan 0-1, W Walsh 0-1, M Morrissey 0-1.		T Sweeney 1-3, L Manning 1-2, T Glynn 1-1, PJ Killilea 1-0, F Glynn 0-2, PJ Lally 0-1.

3 April 1960	Tipperary	3-16 - 2-04	Limerick	Thurles Sportsfield, Thurles
	J Doyle 0-9, L Devaney 1-4, T Moloughney 1-0, L Connolly 1-0, T English 0-1, T Ryan 0-1, G McCarthy 0-1.		L Moloney 1-0, P Hartnett 1-0, L Hogan 0-1, M Hayes 0-1, D Kelly 0-1, PJ Keane 0-1.	Referee: S Spain (Offaly)

=== Final ===
1 May 1960 Final	Cork	3-08 - 2-15	Tipperary	Cork Athletic Grounds, Cork
15:15	C Ring 3-4, P Harte 0-2, T Kelly 0-1, L Dowling 0-1.		Jimmy Doyle 0-9, L Connolly 2-0, D Nealon 0-2, T Ryan 0-2, T English 0-1, G McCarthy 0-1.	Referee: J Fitzgerald (Limerick)

Match programme for the 1960 league final.

=== Top scorers ===
Top scorers overall

Rank	Player	Club	Tally	Total
1	Christy Ring	Cork	12-09	45
2	Jimmy Doyle	Tipperary	5-26	41
3	Eddie Keher	Kilkenny	5-10	25
4	Padge Kehoe	Wexford	5-09	24
5	Ned Long	Carlow	7-02	23
6	Donal Whelan	Waterford	7-01	22
7	Oliver McGrath	Wexford	6-03	21
8	Frankie Walsh	Waterford	1-17	20
9	Larry Shannon	Dublin	3-10	19
10	Mick Quane	Cork	5-03	18

Top scorers in a single game

Rank	Player	Club	Tally	Total	Opposition
1	Christy Ring	Cork	6-04	22	Wexford
1	Christy Ring	Cork	3-04	13	Tipperary
1	J. O'Donoghue	Cork	4-00	12	Antrim
1	Eddie Keher	Kilkenny	3-02	11	Cork
1	Mick Quane	Cork	3-02	11	Dublin
1	Jimmy Doyle	Tipperary	2-05	11	Clare
1	Joe Twomey	Cork	3-01	10	Waterford
1	Ned Long	Carlow	3-01	10	Limerick
1	Jimmy Doyle	Tipperary	3-01	10	Carlow
1	Ned Long	Carlow	3-01	10	Galway

== Division 2 ==
National Hurling League Division 2
- Season: 1959-60
- Champions: Laois; 1st Division 2 title
- All statistics correct as of 4 May 2017.

Laois won the title following a 5-9 to 1-8 win over Roscommon in the final.
