= Thomond Feis =

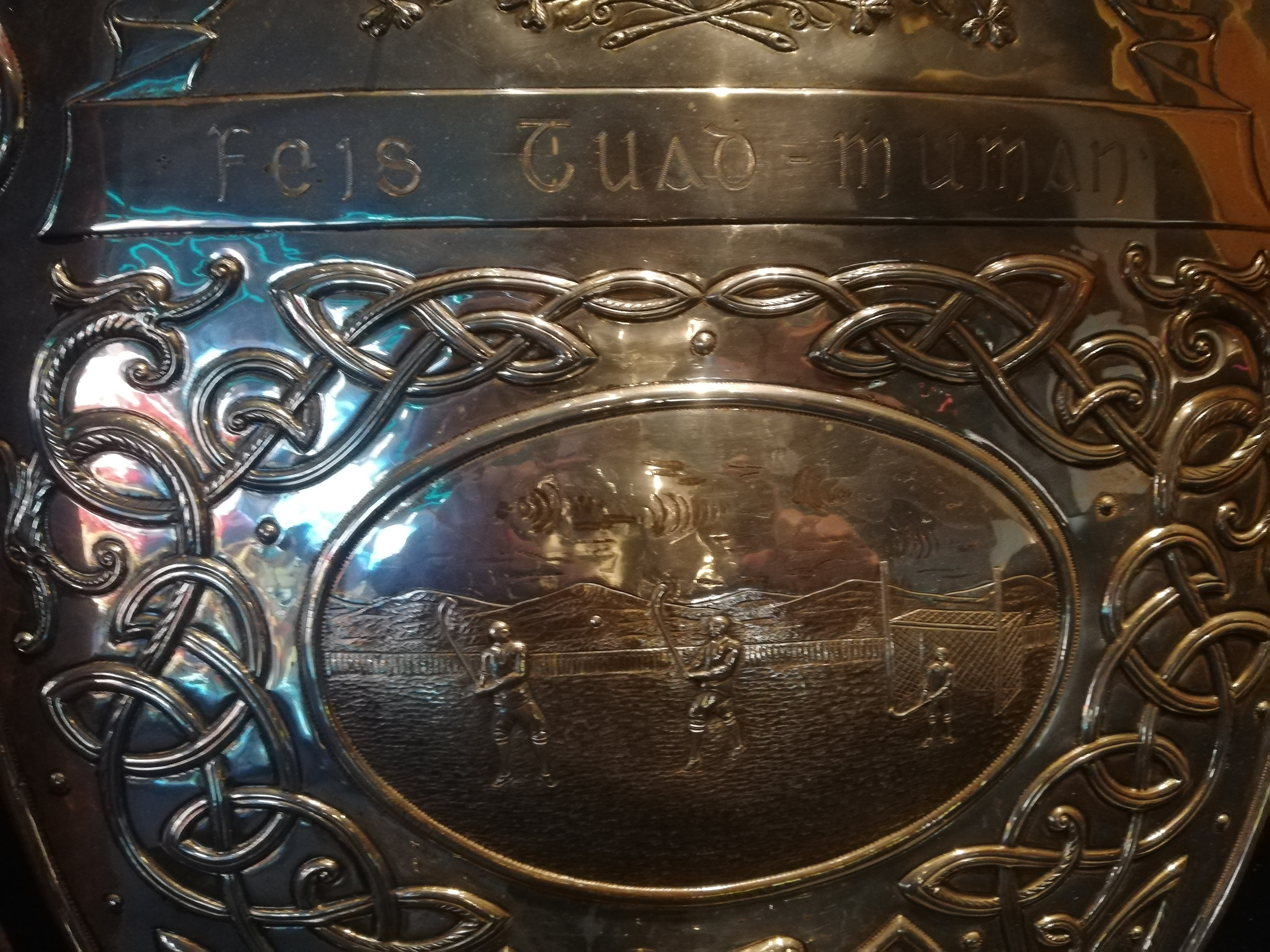
- Detail of the Thomond Feis trophy
- Irish: Feis Tuadh-Mhumhan
- Code: hurling
- Founded: 1913
- Abolished: 1956
- Region: Munster (GAA)
- Trophy: Thomond Feis Shield
- No. of teams: 4
- Most titles: Limerick (14 titles)

The Thomond Feis /ˈθoʊmənd fɛʃ/, also referred to as the Thomond Shield, Thomond Tournament or Thomond Feis Shield, was an annual hurling competition organised by Conradh na Gaeilge (the Gaelic League) between 1913 and 1956 for four of the inter-county teams in the province of Munster in Ireland. It was always played in Limerick City. It was named for the ancient kingdom of Thomond (North Munster), which covered most of counties Limerick and Clare, as well as part of County Tipperary. Cork also competed, despite County Cork not being part of historical Thomond.

The series of games were usually played in the summer months after the completion of the National Hurling League and before the start of the Munster Senior Hurling Championship. The prize for the winning team was a special set of gold medals for the winning team. The tournament was effectively a pre-season warm-up for Munster's top hurling teams and was played as a straight knock-out. The competition was run by the Irish-language organisation the Gaelic League (Conradh na Gaeilge), leading occasionally to conflict with the Gaelic Athletic Association who ran most hurling competitions.

The Thomond Feis was a pre-championship hurling competition, with large crowds attending games. Taken seriously by players, it offered a good indicator of a team's upcoming championship form. Over time, however, it fell out of favour and was eventually scrapped. The Shield awarded to winners is on display in the GAA Museum.

== Roll of honour ==
Team	Wins	Years
Limerick	14	1913, 1920, 1922, 1925, 1928, 1932, 1933, 1934, 1935, 1937, 1940, 1944, 1945, 1947
Tipperary	8	1915, 1916, 1924, 1927, 1930, 1931, 1949, 1951
Cork	7	1914, 1926, 1936, 1941, 1948, 1952, 1954
Clare	3	1929, 1946, 1956

The tournament was not played in 1917, 1918, 1919, 1921, 1923, 1938, 1939, 1942, 1943, 1953 or 1955. The 1950 tournament was unfinished, with Cork and Tipperary to meet in the final.
