= 1953–54 National Hurling League =

23rd season of the National Hurling League

League details
- Dates: 4 October 1953 – 2 May 1954

League champions
- Winners: Tipperary (5th win)
- Captain: Jimmy Finn

League runners-up
- Runners-up: Kilkenny
- Captain: Dan Kennedy

The 1953–54 National Hurling League was the 23rd season of the NHL, an annual hurling competition for the GAA county teams.

== Division 1 ==
=== Division 1A table ===
Pos	Team	Pld	W	D	L	Pts	Notes
1	Kilkenny	4	4	0	0	8	Division 1 runners-up
2	Dublin	4	2	0	2	4	
3	Cork	4	2	0	2	4	
4	Wexford	4	1	0	3	2	
5	Waterford	4	1	0	3	2	

=== Division 1B table ===
Pos	Team	Pld	W	D	L	Pts	Notes
1	Galway	4	3	0	1	6	
2	Clare	3	3	0	0	6	
3	Tipperary	3	2	0	1	4	Division 1 champions
4	Limerick	3	0	0	0	0	
5	Limerick	3	0	0	0	0	

=== Knock-out stage ===
Final

2 May 1954 Final	Tipperary	3-10 - 1-4	Kilkenny	Croke Park, Dublin
