= 1949–50 National Hurling League =

19th season of the National Hurling League

League details
- Dates: 1 October 1949 – 24 September 1950
- Teams: 18

League champions
- Winners: Tipperary (3rd win)

The 1949–50 National Hurling League was the 19th season of the National Hurling League.

== National Hurling League ==
National Hurling League
- Season: 1949–50
- Champions: Tipperary; 3rd National League title Captain: Seán Kenny
- Matches played: 33
- All statistics correct as of 19 March 2017.

The National Hurling League saw a major restructuring for the 1949–50 season. Division 1 and Division 2 were combined to form one division of four groups.

Tipperary came into the season as defending champions of the 1948–49 season.

On 24 September 1950, Tipperary won the title after a 1–12 to 3–4 win over New York in the final. It was their third league title overall and their second in succession.

=== Group A table ===
Pos	Team	Pld	W	D	L	Pts	Notes
1	Kilkenny	4	3	1	0	7	
2	Clare	4	2	1	1	5	
3	Limerick	4	1	0	3	2	
4	Cork	3	1	0	2	2	
5	Galway	3	0	2	1	2	

=== Group stage ===
Kilkenny	1–10 - 3–4	Galway

Clare	5–7 - 3–2	Limerick

Cork	2–1 - 8–10	Kilkenny

Limerick	5–3 - 3–3	Galway

Galway	4–4 - 4–1	Clare

Limerick	2–1 - 5–12	Cork

Kilkenny	5–7 - 1–4	Limerick

Cork	2–2 - 5–9	Clare

Clare	2–7 - 3–13	Kilkenny

=== Group B table ===
Pos	Team	Pld	W	D	L	Pts	Notes
1	Tipperary	4	4	0	0	8	National League champions
2	Dublin	4	2	1	1	5	
3	Waterford	4	2	0	2	4	
4	Laois	4	0	2	2	2	
5	Wexford	4	0	1	3	1	

=== Group stage ===
Tipperary	5–7 - 2–8	Wexford

Dublin	5–5 - 3–4	Waterford

Dublin	3–1 - 5–7	Tipperary

Tipperary	3–5 - 3–2	Laois

Waterford	5–4 - 1–3	Laois

Dublin	2–2 - 0–5	Wexford

Wexford	2–10 - 4–4	Laois

Waterford	2–3 - 7–1	Tipperary

Laois	1–10 - 4–1	Dublin

Waterford	9–2 - 3–7	Wexford

=== Group C table ===
Pos	Team	Pld	W	D	L	Pts	Notes
1	Westmeath	3	2	1	0	5	
2	Offaly	3	1	1	1	3	
3	Wicklow	2	0	2	0	2	
4	Roscommon	2	0	0	2	0	

=== Group stage ===
Westmeath	3–7 - 4–4	Wicklow

Offaly	6–10 - 4–5	Roscommon

Roscommon	4–2 - 9–3	Westmeath

Offaly	4–7 - 5–4	Wicklow

Westmeath	4–6 - 1–2	Offaly

=== Group D table ===
Pos	Team	Pld	W	D	L	Pts	Notes
1	Meath	3	3	0	0	6	
2	Tyrone	2	1	0	1	2	
3	Antrim	2	1	0	1	2	
4	Armagh	3	0	0	3	0	

=== Group stage ===
Armagh	4–4 - 5–5	Tyrone

Meath	8–8 - 2–1	Tyrone

Antrim	6–5 - 1–2	Armagh

Armagh	1–2 - 7–5	Meath

Meath	6–5 - 2–5	Antrim

=== Knock-out stage ===
Semi-finals

26 March 1950 Semi-final	Meath	0–6 - 9–3	Tipperary	St. Loman's Park, Trim

23 April 1950 Semi-final	Westmeath	4–6 - 5–6	Kilkenny	Cusack Park, Mullingar

Home final

7 May 1950 Home Final	Tipperary	3–8 - 1–10	Kilkenny	Croke Park, Dublin
				Attendance: 19,890

Final

24 September 1950 Final	New York	3–4 - 1–12	Tipperary	Polo Grounds, New York City
