= 1948–49 National Hurling League =

18th season of the National Hurling League

League details
- Dates: 10 October 1948 – 8 May 1949
- Teams: 17

League champions
- Winners: Tipperary (2nd win)
- Captain: Pat Stakelum

League runners-up
- Runners-up: Cork
- Captain: Jim Young

Other division winners
- Division 2: Meath

The 1948–49 National Hurling League was the 18th edition of the National Hurling League, which ran from 10 October 1948 until 8 May 1949.

Seventeen teams participated in the league, comprising two divisions of an unequal number of teams. Two points were awarded for a win and one point was awarded for a drawn game. The knock-out phase featured the top three teams from division one and the top two teams from division two.

Tipperary won the league, beating Cork by 3-5 to 3-3 in the final.

== National Hurling League ==
=== Division 1 ===
==== Results ====
6 February 1949 Semi-final	Cork	5-11 - 4-5	Kilkenny	Croke Park

27 February 1949 Final	Tipperary	3-5 - 3-3	Cork	Thurles Sportsfield

=== Division 2 ===
==== Results ====
8 May 1949 Final	Antrim	2-1 - 2-3	Meath	Corrigan Park
