= 1937–38 National Hurling League =

11th season of the National Hurling League

League details
- Dates: October 1937 – 24 April 1938
- Teams: 10

League champions
- Winners: Limerick (5th win)
- Captain: Mick Mackey

League runners-up
- Runners-up: Tipperary
- Captain: Paddy Ryan

The 1937–38 National Hurling League was the 11th completed season of the NHL, an annual hurling competition for the GAA county teams.

== Overview ==
The National Hurling League featured two groups of teams - Group A and Group B. Tipperary won all of their games in Group A, beating Galway, Laois and Westmeath in the process. Limerick topped Group B after beating Cork, Waterford, Clare and Kilkenny. The final saw both group winners play off against each other, with Limerick claiming an all-time record breaking fifth National League title in succession.

== Division placings ==
=== Group A ===
Pos	Team	Pld	W	D	L	Pts	Notes
1	Tipperary	4	4	0	0	8	National League runners-up
2	Dublin	4	3	0	1	6	
3	Galway	4	2	0	2	4	
4	Laois	4	1	0	3	2	
5	Westmeath	4	0	0	4	0	

=== Group B ===
Pos	Team	Pld	W	D	L	Pts	Notes
1	Limerick	4	4	0	0	8	National League champions
2	Cork	4	3	0	1	6	
3	Kilkenny	4	2	0	2	4	
4	Waterford	4	1	0	3	2	
5	Clare	4	0	0	4	0	

==== Results ====
===== Knock-out stage =====
24 April 1938 Final	Tipperary	1-1 - 5-2	Limerick	Thurles Sportsfield
