= 1955–56 National Hurling League =

25th season of the National Hurling League

League details
- Dates: 16 October 1955 – 5 August 1956
- Teams: 18

League champions
- Winners: Wexford (1st win)

Other division winners
- Division 2: Antrim

The 1955–56 National Hurling League was the 25th season of the National Hurling League.

== New structure ==
As a result of a lack of interest from defeated first-round hurling teams in recent years, the GAA's Central Council introduced a new system of relegation and promotion for the 1955-56 league. Division 1 was confined to ten teams comprising two groups of five. The bottom-placed team in each group would play off to decide which of the two teams would be relegated. Division 2 was made up of eight teams comprising two groups of four. The first-placed teams in each group contested the final with the winners being promoted.

== Division 1 ==
National Hurling League Division 1
- Season: 1955-56
- Champions: Wexford; 1st National League title Captain: Tom Ryan
- All statistics correct as of 22 March 2017.

Tipperary came into the season as defending champions of the 1954-55 season.

On 6 May 1956, Wexford won the title after a 5–9 to 2–14 win over Tipperary in the final. It was their first ever league title.

Limerick were relegated.

=== Group 1A table ===
Pos	Team	Pld	W	D	L	Pts	Notes
1	Wexford	4	3	1	0	7	Division 1 champions
2	Cork	4	3	0	1	6	
3	Dublin	4	2	0	2	4	
4	Waterford	4	1	0	3	2	
5	Kilkenny	4	0	1	3	1	

=== Group 1B table ===
Pos	Team	Pld	W	D	L	Pts	Notes
1	Tipperary	4	4	0	0	8	Division 1 runners-up
2	Galway	4	3	0	1	6	
3	Clare	4	2	0	2	4	
4	Westmeath	4	1	0	3	2	
5	Limerick	4	0	0	4	0	Relegated to Division 2

=== Knock-out stage ===
Final

6 May 1956 Final	Wexford	5-9 – 2-14	Tipperary	Croke Park, Dublin
	N Rackard 2-2, T Dixon 2-0, T Ryan 1-1, J Morrissey 0-2, N Wheeler 0-2, Padge Kehoe 0-2.		P Kenny 2-7, S Bannon 0-2, P Stakelum 0-2, L Devaney 0-1, L Keane 0-1, T English 0-1.	Attendance: 49,502

== Division 2 ==
National Hurling League Division 2
- Season: 1955-56
- Champions: Antrim; 1st Division 2 title
- All statistics correct as of 22 March 2017.

In a new departure the Gaelic Athletic Association introduced a second division for the 'second tier' hurling teams. Division 2 featured eight teams divided into two groups - 2A and 2B. The first group featured Down, Meath, Antrim and Wicklow. The second group featured Offaly, Roscommon, Kerry and Laois. Antrim finished top of group 2A and were crowned champions after defeating group 2B winners Kerry in the final. Antrim thus won promotion to division one for the following year.

=== Group 2A table ===
Pos	Team	Pld	W	D	L	Pts	Notes
1	Antrim	3	3	0	0	6	Division 1 champions
2	Meath	3	2	0	1	4	
3	Wicklow	3	1	0	2	2	
4	Down	3	0	0	3	0	

=== Group 2B table ===
Pos	Team	Pld	W	D	L	Pts	Notes
1	Kerry	3	3	0	0	6	Division 1 runners-up
2	Laois	3	2	0	1	4	
3	Offaly	3	1	0	2	2	
4	Roscommon	3	0	0	3	0	

=== Knock-out stage ===
Finals

6 May 1956 Final	Antrim	2-7 - 1-10	Kerry	Croke Park, Dublin
				Attendance: 49,502

5 August 1956 Final replay	Antrim	4-14 - 5-4	Kerry	Croke Park, Dublin
