= 1954–55 National Hurling League =

24th season of the National Hurling League

League details
- Dates: 10 October 1954 – May 1955

League champions
- Winners: Tipperary (6th win)

The 1954–55 National Hurling League was the 24th season of the National Hurling League.

== Division 1 ==
National Hurling League Division 1
- Season: 1954–55
- Champions: Tipperary; 6th National League title Captain: John Doyle
- All statistics correct as of 2 April 2017.

Tipperary came into the season as defending champions of the 1953–54 season.

On 1 May 1955, Tipperary won the title after a 3–5 to 1–5 win over Wexford in the final. It was their 6th league title and their second title in succession.

=== Group 1A table ===
Pos	Team	Pld	W	D	L	Pts	Notes
1	Wexford	5	5	0	0	10	Division 1 runners-up
2	Dublin	5	4	0	1	8	
3	Kilkenny	5	3	0	2	6	
4	Cork	4	1	0	3	2	
5	Waterford	5	1	0	4	2	
6	Meath	4	0	0	4	0	

=== Group 1B table ===
Pos	Team	Pld	W	D	L	Pts	Notes
1	Tipperary	4	4	0	0	8	Division 1 champions
2	Clare	4	3	0	1	6	
3	Galway	4	2	0	2	4	
4	Limerick	4	1	0	3	2	
5	Laois	4	1	0	3	2	

=== Knock-out stage ===
Semi-final

17 April 1955 Semi-final	Tipperary	3–8 – 0–6	Clare	Gaelic Grounds, Limerick
				Referee: P O'Connell (Offaly)

Final

1 May 1955 Final	Tipperary	3–5 – 1–5	Wexford	Croke Park, Dublin
