= 1984 Tipperary Senior Hurling Championship =

Annual hurling competition season

- Dates: 9 September - 14 October 1984
- Teams: 8
- Champions: Moycarkey-Borris (12th title); Jack Bergin (captain); Paddy Doyle (manager)
- Runners-up: Lorrha; Kieran Hough (captain)

Tournament statistics
- Matches played: 9
- Goals scored: 32 (3.56 per match)
- Points scored: 174 (19.33 per match)
- Top scorer(s): John Flanagan (3-18)

The 1984 Tipperary Senior Hurling Championship was the 93rd staging of the Tipperary Senior Hurling Championship since its establishment by the Tipperary County Board in 1887.

Borris-Ileigh were the defending champions.

Moycarkey-Borris won the championship after a 2–08 to 0–09 defeat of Lorrha in the final at Semple Stadium. It was their 11th championship title overall and their first title since 1982. It remains their last championship triumph.

== Results ==
=== Quarter-finals ===
9 September 1984 Quarter-final	Lorrha	3-11 - 0-07	Éire Óg Annacarty	Páirc Shíleáin
	J Kennedy 2-1, W Fogarty 1-3, K Hough 0-2, A McIntyre 0-2, B Mannion 0-1, J O'Sullivan 0-1, F Sherlock 0-1.		S Fox 0-5, T Gleeson 0-1, K Fox 0-1.

9 September 1984 Quarter-final	Cappawhite	5-06 - 1-06	Nenagh Éire Óg	Páirc Shíleáin
	P O'Neill 1-4, G O'Neill 1-2, A Buckley 1-0, E Maguire 1-0, A O'Neill 1-0.		J Grogan 1-2, J Heffernan 0-2, P Kennedy 0-2.

16 September 1984 Quarter-final	Moycarkey-Borris	1-15 - 3-01	Carrick Swans	Leahy Park
	D Quigley 1-3, J Flanagan 0-5, J Cormack 0-3, D Fogarty 0-2, J Bergin 0-1, J Leahy 0-1.		T Lonergan 1-1, B White 1-0, T Fitzpatrick 1-0.

16 September 1984 Quarter-final	Drom-Inch	3-10 - 2-13	Éire Óg	Leahy Park
	P Lobby 2-2, John Harkin 0-4, J Kennedy 1-0, J Cahill 0-2, P Butler 0-1, T Butler 0-1.		K Shelly 1-5, O Maher 1-0, D O'Connell 0-3, D Ahearne 0-3, M Hassett 0-2.

30 October 1984 Quarter-final replay	Drom-Inch	2-12 - 0-11	Éire Óg	Leahy Park
	John Harkin 1-3, P Looby 0-5, S Hassett 1-1, T Butler 0-1, Joe Harkin 0-1, P Butler 0-1.		K Shelly 0-4, M Hassett 0-2, M Shanahan 0-1, D Ahearne 0-1, M Meaney 0-1, D O'Connell 0-1, D McGettigan 0-1.

=== Semi-finals ===
30 September 1984 Semi-final	Moycarkey-Borris	2-10 - 1-13	Cappawhite	Leahy Park
	J Flanagan 1-4, E Slattery 1-0, J Bergin 0-1, L Begin 0-1, D Quigley 0-1, T Cullagh 0-1, J McCormack 0-1, D Fogarty 0-1.		A Buckley 0-6, P O'Neill 0-4, G Ryan 1-0, A O'Neill 0-2, M McDermott 0-1.

7 October 1984 Semi-final	Lorrha	2-07 - 0-06	Drom-Inch	MacDonagh Park
	A McIntyre 1-2, K Hough 1-0, W Fogarty 0-3, J O'Sullivan 0-1, J Kennedy 0-1.		John Harkin 0-3, M Butler 0-1, T Butler 0-1, S Hassett 0-1.

7 October 1984 Semi-final replay	Moycarkey-Borris	3-14 - 2-12	Cappawhite	MacDonagh Park
	J Flanagan 1-6, E Slattery 1-2, T Cullagh 1-2, D Quigley 0-2, J McCormack 0-2.		P O'Neill 1-3, G O'Neill 1-0, C Ryan 0-3, A Buckley 0-2, A O'Neill 0-2, G Ryan 0-1, D Hennessy 0-1.

=== Final ===
14 October 1984 Final	Moycarkey-Borris	2-08 - 0-09	Lorrha	Semple Stadium
	J Flanagan 1-3, E Slattery 1-2, J McCormack 0-1, D Quigley 0-1, D Fogarty 0-1.		W Fogarty 0-4, J Kennedy 0-3, E Sherlock 0-1, J O'Sullivan 0-1.	Referee: W Barrett (Ardfinnan)

== Championship statistics ==
=== Top scorers ===
Overall

Rank	Player	Club	Tally	Total	Matches	Average
1	John Flanagan	Moycarkey-Borris	3-18	27	4	6.75
2	Pat O'Neill	Cappawhite	2-11	17	3	5.66
3	Ned Slattery	Moycarkey-Borris	3-04	13	4	3.25
3	Pat Looby	Drom-Inch	2-07	13	4	3.25
3	John Harkin	Drom-Inch	1-10	13	4	3.25
3	Willie Fogarty	Lorrhan	1-10	13	3	4.33
7	Kevin Shelly	Éire Óg	1-09	12	2	6.00
8	Joe Kennedy	Lorrha	2-05	11	3	3.66
8	Austin Buckley	Cappawhite	1-08	11	3	3.66
10	Dick Quigley	Moycarkey-Borris	1-07	10	4	2.50

In a single game

Rank	Player	Club	Tally	Total	Opposition
1	John Flanagan	Moycarkey-Borris	1-06	9	Cappawhite
2	Pat Looby	Drom-Inch	2-02	8	Éire Óg
2	Kevin Shelly	Éire Óg	1-05	8	Drom-Inch
4	Joe Kennedy	Lorrha	2-01	7	Éire Óg Annacarty
4	Pat O'Neill	Cappawhite	1-04	7	Nenagh Éire Óg
4	John Flanagan	Moycarkey-Borris	1-04	7	Cappawhite
7	Willie Fogarty	Lorrhan	1-03	6	Éire Óg Annacarty
7	Dick Quigley	Moycarkey-Borris	1-03	6	Carrick Swans
7	John Harkin	Drom-Inch	1-03	6	Éire Óg
7	Pat O'Neill	Cappawhite	1-03	6	Moycarkey-Borris
7	John Flanagan	Moycarkey-Borris	1-03	6	Lorrha
7	Austin Buckley	Cappawhite	0-06	6	Moycarkey-Borris
