= 1974–75 National Hurling League =

44th season of the National Hurling League

League details
- Dates: 29 September 1974 – 25 May 1975

League champions
- Winners: Galway (3rd win)

Other division winners
- Division 2: Westmeath

The 1974–75 National Hurling League was the 44th season of the National Hurling League.

== Division 1 ==
National Hurling League Division 1
- Season: 1974-75
- Champions: Galway; 3rd National League title Captain: John Connolly
- Matches: 47
- Top goalscorer: Francis Loughnane (5-35)
- All statistics correct as of 20 March 2017.

Cork came into the season as defending champions of the 1973-74 season.

On 25 May 1975, Galway won the title following a 4-9 to 4-6 win over Tipperary in the final. It was their 3rd league title overall and their first since 1950-51.

Wicklow were relegated to Division 2 after losing all of their group stage matches in Division 1B.

Tipperary's Francis Loughnane was the Division 1 top scorer with 5-35.

=== Division 1A table ===
Pos	Team	Pld	W	D	L	Diff	Pts	Notes
1	Kilkenny	7	6	0	1	+42	12	
2	Clare	7	5	0	2	+17	10	
3	Tipperary	7	3	3	1	+33	9	Division 1 runners-up
4	Cork	7	4	1	2	+18	9	
5	Wexford	7	2	2	3	-12	6	
6	Dublin	7	1	2	4	-20	4	
7	Limerick	7	2	0	5	-30	4	
8	Waterford	7	1	0	6	-48	2	Relegated to Division 1B

=== Group stage ===
29 September 1974	Tipperary	2-9 - 2-9	Cork	Semple Stadium, Thurles
	P Sheedy 1-1, F Loughnane 0-4, S Hogan 0-4, J Flanagan 1-0.		E Fitzpatrick 1-1, C McCarthy 0-4, G McCarthy 1-0, M Malone 0-1, J Barry-Murphy 0-1, M Doherty 0-1, P O'Connor 0-1.	Referee: S O'Connor (Limerick)

29 September 1974	Clare	2-9 - 1-4	Dublin	Dr. Daly Park, Tulla
	C Honan 1-2, N Casey 1-0, E O'Connor 0-3, P O'Connor 0-1, M McNamara 0-1, C Woods 0-1, N Ryan 0-1.		V Holden 1-0, P Quigley 0-2, M Bermingham 0-1, P Carton 0-1.	Referee: S O'Grady (Limerick)

29 September 1974	Limerck	1-11 - 2-15	Kilkenny	Gaelic Grounds, Limerick
	F Nolan 1-1, L O'Donoghue 0-2, J McKenna 0-2, P Kelly 0-2, E Grimes 0-1, E Cregan 0-1, R Bennis 0-1, N Rea 0-1.		E Keher 2-4, K Purcell 0-3, M Crotty 0-2, P Delaney 0-2, L O'Brien 0-2, F Cummins 0-1, M Brennan 0-1.	Referee: M Spain (Offaly)

6 October 1974	Waterford	2-7 - 3-5	Wexford	Walsh Park, Waterford
	J Kirwan 1-1, A Reide 1-0, M Geary 0-2, J Greene 0-1, P O'Grady 0-1, T Casey 0-1, M Walsh 0-1.		T Byrne 1-4, J Quigley 1-0, P Flynn 1-0, M Butler 0-1.	Referee: P Johnston (Kilkenny)

13 October 1974	Cork	2-7 - 1-7	Limerick	The Mardyke, Cork
	C McCarthy 1-6, E O'Donoghue 1-0, P Hegarty 0-1.		R Bennis 1-4, L Enright 0-1, J McKenna 0-1, N Rea 0-1.	Referee: S O'Meara (Tipperary)

13 October 1974	Dublin	0-10 - 2-13	Waterford	Croke Park, Dublin
	P Quigley 0-7, T Grealish 0-1, E Davey 0-1, J Towel 0-1.		P O'Grady 0-6, M Walsh 1-2, S Greene 1-0, J Kirwan 0-2, M Whelan 0-1, M Geary 0-1, J Galvin 0-1.	Referee: M Slattery (Clare)

13 October 1974	Kilkenny	3-18 - 3-8	Clare	Nowlan Park, Kilkenny
	E Keher 0-7, K Purcell 1-2, B Harte 1-2, N Brennan 1-1, L O'Brien 0-2, F Cummins 0-2, M Crotty 0-2.		C Honan 1-6, G Lohan 1-1, E O'Connor 1-0, N Ryan 0-1.	Referee: N Dalton (Waterford)

27 October 1974	Waterford	1-2 - 4-7	Cork	Fraher Field, Dungarvan
	M Ormonde 1-1, P O'Grady 0-1.		J Rothwell 2-0, C McCarthy 1-3, T O'Brien 1-1, G McCarthy 0-1, P Hegarty 0-1, N Crowley 0-1.	Referee: S O'Connor (Limerick)

27 October 1974	Clare	3-9 - 1-2	Wexford	Dr. Daly Park, Tulla
	N Ryan 1-1, E O'Connor 1-1, G Lohan 1-0, J Callnan 0-3, C Honan 0-3, C Woods 0-1.		T Byrne 1-0, C Jacobs 0-1, W Murphy 0-1.	Referee: T Kelly (Galway)

27 October 1974	Limerick	2-8 - 2-5	Dublin	Gaelic Grounds, Limerick
	S Condon 1-2, P Hayes 1-0, F Nolan 0-2, E Cregan 0-1, J McKenna 0-1, R Bennis 0-1, L Enright 0-1.		P Quigley 0-5, R Walsh 1-0, V Holden 1-0.	Referee: M Spain (Offaly)

27 October 1974	Tipperary	1-8 - 1-11	Kilkenny	MacDonagh Park, Nenagh
	S McMahon 1-4, P Byrne 0-1, J Flanagan 0-1, L McGrath 0-1, S Hogan 0-1.		E Keher 0-4, G Fennelly 0-4, B Fitzpatrick 1-0, L O'Brien 0-2, M Crotty 0-1.	Referee: J O'Grady (Limerick)

3 November 1974	Wexford	3-5 - 3-5	Tipperary	O'Kennedy Park, New Ross
	T Doran 2-0, T Byrne 1-0, S Kinsella 0-2, J Murphy 0-2, J Quigley 0-1.		F Loughnane 2-2, S Power 1-0, P Byrne 0-2, S Hogan 0-1.

10 November 1974	Cork	1-10 - 3-6	Clare	Charleville Sportsfield, Charleville
	G McCarthy 1-5, C McCarthy 0-4, J Rothwell 0-1.		G Lohan 2-0, E O'Connor 1-0, J McNamara 0-2, N Ryan 0-2, C Woods 0-1, J Callinane 0-1.	Referee: S O'Grady (Limerick)

10 November 1974	Dublin	1-11 - 1-11	Tipperary	Croke Park, Dublin
	T Grealish 1-2, P Quigley 0-2, E Davey 0-2, V Holden 0-2, M Reidy 0-1, P Carton 0-1, PJ Holden 0-1.		F Loughnane 0-6, S Power 1-1, S Hogan 0-3, P Quinlan 0-1.	Referee: M Spain (Offaly)

10 November 1974	Kilkenny	0-18 - 0-7	Waterford	Nowlan Park, Kilkenny
	E Keher 0-8, M Brennan 0-4, P Delaney 0-3, M Crotty 0-1, G Fennelly 0-1, K Purcell 0-1.		J Kirwan 0-4, M Ormonde 0-2, M Walsh 0-1.	Referee: J Rankins (Laois)

10 November 1974	Wexford	2-12 - 0-4	Limerick	Wexford Park, Wexford
	S Kinsella 0-6, J Murphy 1-2, T Doran 1-0, M Casey 0-2, M Butler 0-1, P Flynn 0-1.		P Fitzmaurice 0-2, J Neenan 0-1, R Ryan 0-1.	Referee: M Dalton (Waterford)

24 November 1974	Cork	1-14 - 2-9	Kilkenny	The Mardyke, Cork
	G McCarthy 1-4, C McCarthy 0-7, M O'Doherty 0-1, P O'Connor 0-1, E O'Donoghue 0-1.		E Keher 0-5, M Crotty 1-1, M Brennan 1-0, K Purcell 0-1, P Delaney 0-1, L O'Brien 0-1.	Referee: N Dalton (Waterford)

24 November 1974	Limerick	2-7 - 4-15	Tipperary	Gaelic Grounds, Limerick
	E Grimes 1-1, N Rea 1-0, F Nolan 0-2, P Kelly 0-1, B Savage 0-1, E Cregan 0-1, L Enright 0-1.		S Power 2-1, J Kehoe 1-3, F Loughnane 0-5, T Butler 1-0, P Byrne 0-2, R Ryan 0-1, S Hogan 0-1, T O'Connor 0-1, J Noonan 0-1.	Referee: J Rankins (Laois)

24 November 1974	Wexford	1-15 - 4-6	Dublin	Páirc Uí Shíocháin, Gorey
	S Kinsella 0-10, T Doran 1-0, J Quigley 0-2, M Casey 0-2, M Jacob 0-1.		P Quigley 1-4, T Grealish 1-1, M Hanlon 1-0, N Rooney 1-0, D Walsh 0-1.	Referee: P Johnston (Kilkenny)

24 November 1974	Clare	2-7 - 0-5	Waterford	Dr. Daly Park, Tulla
	C Honan 1-6, E O'Connor 1-0, J Callinan 0-1.			Referee: B Cross (Limerick)

9 February 1975	Kilkenny	2-12 - 2-6	Wexford	Nowlan Park, Kilkenny
	L O'Brien 0-9, M Brennan 1-1, B Fitzpatrick 1-1, G Fennelly 0-1.		M Quigley 1-1, S Kinsella 1-1, J Quigley 0-1, J Murphy 0-1, M Casey 0-1, T Byrne 0-1.	Referee: S O'Grady (Limerick)

9 February 1975	Dublin	1-15 - 2-5	Cork	Croke Park, Dublin
	P Quigley 0-7, D Walsh 1-1, M Reidy 0-4, P Carton 0-2, T Grealish 0-1.		C McCarthy 1-2, J Rothwell 1-0, J Buckley 0-3.	Referee: R Dowling (Kilkenny)

9 February 1975	Tipperary	2-13 - 2-7	Clare	MacDonagh Park, Nenagh
	F Loughnane 1-9, P Byrne 1-0, T Butler 0-2, S Hogan 0-1, J Kehoe 0-1.		G Lohan 1-0, P Russell 1-0, J McNamara 0-2, C Honan 0-2, N Ryan 0-1, E O'Connor 0-1, P O'Connor 0-1.	Referee: P Johnston (Kilkenny)

9 February 1975	Waterford	0-5 - 2-6	Limerick	Gaelic Grounds, Limerick
	M Ormonde 0-2, J Kirwan 0-1, P McGrath 0-1, M Whelan 0-1.		R Bennis 1-3, J McKenna 1-1, P Fitzmaurice 0-1, L O'Donoghue 0-1.

9 March 1975	Cork	4-9 - 2-7	Wexford	The Mardyke, Cork
	G McCarthy 1-4, P O'Connor 1-0, J Barry-Murphy 1-0, E O'Donoghue 1-0, C McCarthy 0-3, S O'Leary 0-1, C Roche 0-1.		J Murphy 1-2, C Keogh 1-1, J Quigley 0-3, T Byrne 0-1.	Referee: J O'Grady (Limerick)

9 March 1975	Kilkenny	1-13 - 0-9	Dublin	Nowlan Park, Kilkenny
	M Brennan 1-5, N Brennan 0-3, L O'Brien 0-3, D McNamara 0-1, G Woodcock 0-1.		P Quigley 0-4, M Reidy 0-3, T Grealish 0-1,	Referee: J Collins (Tipperary)

9 March 1975	Clare	2-11 - 3-6	Limerick	Cusack Park, Ennis
	G Lohan 2-0, T Kelly 0-5, C Honan 0-4, J Cullinane 0-1, N Ryan 0-1.		S Condon 2-0, L Enright 1-1, R Bennis 0-4, P Fitzmaurice 0-1.	Referee: S O'Meara (Tipperary)

9 March 1975	Tipperary	5-10 - 0-9	Waterford	Páirc Dáibhín, Carrick-on-Suir
	F Loughnane 1-3, J Flanagan 1-2, J Kehoe 1-2, P Byrne 1-1, R Ryan 1-1, T Butler 0-1.		P Kelly 0-4, M Whelan 0-3, T Reade 0-1, J Greene 0-1.	Referee: S O'Connor (Limerick)

=== Division 1B table ===
Pos	Team	Pld	W	D	L	Diff	Pts	Notes
1	Galway	5	4	0	1	+30	8	Division 1 champions
2	Kildare	5	4	0	1	+25	8	
3	Laois	5	3	0	2	+25	6	
4	Offaly	5	3	0	2	-1	6	
5	Antrim	4	0	0	4	-18	0	
6	Wicklow	4	0	0	4	-51	0	Relegated to Division 2

=== Group stage ===
29 September 1974	Offaly	0-8 - 2-10	Laois	St. Brendan's Park, Birr
	K Mooney 0-3, P Moloughney 0-2, D Dooley 0-2, G Woods 0-1.		M Morrissey 2-0, M Mahon 0-5, P Dillon 0-2, J Mahon 0-2, P Finlay 0-1.	Referee: S O'Meara (Tipperary)

29 September 1974	Galway	1-13 - 3-4	Kildare	Pearse Stadium, Salthill
	PJ Molloy 0-6, J Coone 1-1, P Fahy 0-2, S Grealish 0-1, J Connolly 0-1, M Barrett 0-1, PJ Qualter 0-1.		J Walsh 2-1, J Wall 1-0, N Walsh 0-1, B Burke 0-1, J O'Leary 0-1.	Referee: J Woods (Clare)

13 October 1974	Kildare	2-7 - 0-10	Laois	St. Conleth's Park, Newbridge
	J Walsh 1-6, N Walsh 1-0, M Deely 0-1.		M Mahon 0-5, F Keenan 0-3, J Mahon 0-1, P Fennelly 0-1.	Referee: G Kirwan (Offaly)

13 October 1974	Offaly	5-3 - 3-8	Antrim	St. Brendan's Park, Birr
	P Mulhare 1-1, H Bevans 1-0, P Moloughney 1-0, K Mooney 1-0, M Cleere 1-0, J Fleury 0-1, D Hanniffy 0-1.		R McDonnell 2-0, A Thornbury 1-0, E Dornan 0-2, S Collins 0-2, S Ward 0-1, M Brosty 0-1, M McKillop 0-1, J Fagan 0-1.	Referee: T Boyle (Galway)

20 October 1974	Wicklow	0-2 - 1-12	Galway	Baltinglass Sportsfield, Baltinglass
	S Brennan 0-1, P Byrne 0-1.		PJ Molloy 0-5, M Barrett 1-0, J Connolly 0-2, PJ Qualter 0-1, L Bohan 0-1, J McDonagh 0-1, P Fahy 0-1.	Referee: G Summerville (Dublin)

27 October 1974	Galway	0-6 - 2-3	Offaly	Duggan Park, Ballinasloe
	PJ Molloy 0-5, J Connolly 0-1.		P Mulhare 1-0, K Mooney 1-0, J Kelly 0-1, PJ Whelehan 0-1, P Horan 0-1.	Referee: S O'Meara (Tipperary)

27 October 1974	Kildare	2-8 - 0-5	Wicklow	Sallins Road, Naas
	M Walsh 1-0, T White 1-0, P White 0-3, B Burke 0-2, P Dunny 0-2, J O'Leary 0-1.		A Byrne 0-2, L Collins 0-1, T Kennedy 0-1, M Naill 0-1.	Referee: J Rankins (Laois)

27 October 1974	Laois	3-14 - 3-9	Antrim	Fr. Breen Park, Abbeyleix
	M Morrissey 2-0, M Wall 1-2, F Keenan 0-5, E Moore 0-2, M Mahon 0-2, M Walsh 0-1, P Fennelly 0-1.		A Thornbury 3-2, R McDonald 0-3, E Dornan 0-1, J McCallum 0-1, M Killop 0-1, S Collins 0-1.	Referee: R Dowling (Kilkenny)

9 February 1975	Offaly	0-10 - 4-7	Kildare	St. Brendan's Park, Birr
	K Mooney 0-4, PJ Whelehan 0-2, P Mulhaire 0-1, J Kelly 0-1, M Cleere 0-1, P Corcoran 0-1.		J Walsh 1-5, T White 1-0, M O'Brien 1-0, N Walsh 1-0, J O'Connell 0-1, P White 0-1.	Referee: C Foley (Dublin)

9 February 1975	Antrim	3-4 - 2-12	Galway	Corrigan Park, Belfast
	E McDonnell 2-0, A Thornbury 1-0, E Donnelly 0-3, S Dornan 0-1.		G Coone 1-2, PJ Qualter 1-0, S Murphy 0-3, J Connolly 0-2, P Fahy 0-2, F Burke 0-2, M Barrett 0-1.

9 February 1975	Laois	4-12 - 0-7	Wicklow	O'Moore Park, Portlaoise
	P Dillon 1-2, M Morrissey 1-1, F Keenan 1-1, G Lanham 1-0, P Dowling 0-2, P Dunphy 0-2, J Mahon 0-1, M Mahon 0-2, M Walsh 0-1.		A Byrne 0-1, P Barry 0-1, L Collins 0-1, T Collins 0-1, S Doyle 0-1, S Kehoe 0-1, M Pearson 0-1.	Referee: J Collins (Tipperary)

9 March 1975	Galway	4-8 - 1-5	Laois	Duggan Park, Ballinasloe
	J Connolly 2-1, G Holland 2-1, G Coone 0-3, F Burke 0-2, S Murphy 0-1.		P Dillon 1-0, J Mahon 0-2, M Walsh 0-2, M Morrissey 0-1.	Referee: J Henry (Westmeath)

9 March 1975	Kildare	3-8 - 1-7	Antrim	Geraldine Park, Athy
	J Walshe 0-6, T White 1-0, J O'Leary 1-0, J Wall 1-0, J O'Connell 0-1, P White 0-1.		E Donnelly 1-1, E Dornan 0-4, R McDonald 0-1, J O'Neill 0-1.	Referee: G Kirwan (Offaly)

9 March 1975	Wicklow	1-5 - 3-11	Offaly	Carnew
	S Doyle 1-2, N Pearson 0-3.		J Kelly 2-0, PJ Whelehan 1-3, K Mooney 0-6, P Mulhaire 0-1, P Horan 0-1.	Referee: J Rankin (Laois)

=== Knock-out stage ===
Quarter-finals

23 March 1975 Quarter-final	Galway	2-7 - 2-5	Cork	Gaelic Grounds, Limerick
	J Connolly 1-1, M Barrett 1-1, PJ Molloy 0-2, I Clarke 0-1, G Coone 0-1, F Burke 0-1.		G McCarthy 1-1, W Walsh 1-0, C McCarthy 0-3, C Roche 0-1.	Referee: S O'Connor (Limerick)

23 March 1975 Quarter-final	Kildare	1-6 - 1-13	Tipperary	Sallins Road, Naas
	J Walsh 0-6, F Deering 1-0.		F Loughnane 1-5, S Hogan 0-2, P Fanning 0-2, J Flanagan 0-2, J Noonan 0-1, T Butler 0-1.	Referee: S O'Grady (Limerick)

Semi-finals

27 April 1975 Semi-final	Tipperary	1-9 - 0-10	Clare	Gaelic Grounds, Limerick
	J Flanagan 0-8, F Murphy 1-0, S Hogan 0-1.		C Honan 0-6, T Kelly 0-2, N Ryan 0-1, E O'Connor 0-1.	Attendance: 12,000; Referee: S O'Grady (Limerick)

4 May 1975 Semi-final	Galway	1-9 - 1-6	Kilkenny	Semple Stadium, Thurles
	G Coone 0-5, F Burke 1-0, PJ Molloy 0-2, PJ Qualter 0-1, P Fahy 0-1.		E Keher 1-4, M Brennan 0-1, L O'Brien 0-1.	Referee: J Moloney (Tipperary)

Final

25 May 1975 Final	Galway	4-9 - 4-6	Tipperary	Gaelic Grounds, Limerick
16:00	M Barrett 2-0, PJ Qualtar 1-0, J Connolly 1-0, PJ Molloy 0-3, P Fahy 0-2, F Burke 0-2, S Silke 0-1, L Clarke 0-1.		J Flanagan 1-3, P Quinlan 1-1, R Ryan 1-1, T Butler 1-0, F Loughnane 0-1.	Attendance: 32,400; Referee: F Murphy (Cork)

=== Scoring statistics ===
Top scorers overall

Rank	Player	Team	Tally	Total	Matches	Average
1	Francis Loughnane	Tipperary	5-35	50	9	5.55
2	Charlie McCarthy	Cork	3-32	41	8	5.12
2	Eddie Keher	Kilkenny	3-32	41	6	6.83
4	Colm Honan	Clare	3-29	38	8	4.75
5	Johnny Walsh	Kildare	4-24	36	5	7.20
6	Pat Quigley	Dublin	1-31	34	7	4.85
7	Gerald McCarthy	Cork	5-15	30	7	4.28
8	John Flanagan	Tipperary	3-16	25	9	2.77
9	P. J. Molloy	Galway	0-23	23	7	3.28
10	Gus Lohan	Clare	7-01	22	6	3.66

Top scorers in a single game

Rank	Player	Team	Tally	Total	Opposition
1	Francis Loughnane	Tipperary	1-09	12	Clare
2	Aidan Thornbury	Antrim	3-02	11	Laois
3	Eddie Keher	Kilkenny	2-04	10	Limerick
3	Seán Kinsella	Wexford	0-10	10	Dublin
5	Charlie McCarthy	Cork	1-06	9	Limerick
5	Colm Honan	Clare	1-06	9	Limerick
5	Colm Honan	Clare	1-06	9	Waterford
5	Johnny Walsh	Kildare	1-06	9	Laois
5	Liam O'Brien	Kilkenny	0-09	9	Wexford
10	Francis Loughnane	Tipperary	2-02	8	Wexford
10	Gerald McCarthy	Cork	1-05	8	Clare
10	Mick Brennan	Kilkenny	1-05	8	Dublin
10	Johnny Walsh	Kildare	1-05	8	Offaly
10	Francis Loughnane	Tipperary	1-05	8	Kildare
10	Eddie Keher	Kilkenny	0-08	8	Waterford
10	John Flanagan	Tipperary	0-08	8	Clare

== Division 2 ==
National Hurling League Division 2
- Season: 1974-75
- Champions: Westmeath
- All statistics correct as of 21 March 2017.

=== Division 2 table ===
Pos	Team	Pld	W	D	L	Pts	Notes
1	Westmeath	4	3	1	0	7	Division 2 champions
2	Kerry	4	3	0	1	6	
3	Down	4	2	0	2	4	
4	Meath	4	1	0	3	2	
5	Carlow	4	0	1	3	1	
