= Phil Lowry =

Tipperary hurler

Personal information
- Native name: Pilib Ó Ó Labhraí (Irish)
- Born: 1946 (age 79–80) Upperchurch, County Tipperary, Ireland

Sport
- Sport: Hurling
- Position: Left corner-back
Club
- Years: Club
- Upperchurch–Drombane
Club titles
- Tipperary titles: 0
Inter-county
- Years: County
- 1967-1971: Tipperary
Inter-county titles
- Munster titles: 0
- All-Irelands: 0
- NHL: 0
- All Stars: 0

Philip Lowry (born 1946) is an Irish former hurler. At club level, he played with Upperchurch–Drombane and at inter-county level with the Tipperary senior hurling team.

== Playing career ==
Lowry began his career at juvenile and underage levels with the Upperchurch–Drombane club, before progressing to adult level. At inter-county level, he first played for Tipperary at wing-forward on the under-21 team that won three All-Ireland U21HC title after a 1–08 to 1–07 win over Dublin in the 1967 All-Ireland under-21 final. Lowry later lined out with the senior team. He ended his inter-county career by claiming an All-Ireland IHC medal in 1971 after a 3–16 to 3–13 win over Wicklow in the final.

== Coaching career ==
Lowry was a selector with the Tipperary senior hurling team in 1982.

== Honours ==
Upperchurch–Drombane

- Mid Tipperary Junior A Hurling Championship: 1966

Tipperary

- All-Ireland Intermediate Hurling Championship: 1971
- Munster Intermediate Hurling Championship: 1971
- All-Ireland Under-21 Hurling Championship: 1967
- Munster Under-21 Hurling Championship: 1967
