= Tommy O'Dwyer =

Irish hurler

Personal information
- Native name: Tomás Ó Duibhir (Irish)
- Born: 1950 (age 75–76) Borrisoleigh, County Tipperary, Ireland
- Occupation: Post office employee

Sport
- Sport: Hurling
- Position: Right corner-forward
Club
- Years: Club
- Borris–Ileigh
Club titles
- Tipperary titles: 3
- Munster titles: 1
- All-Ireland Titles: 1
Inter-county
Years	County	Apps (scores)
1972-1977	Tipperary	2 (0-01)
Inter-county titles
- Munster titles: 0
- All-Irelands: 0
- NHL: 0
- All Stars: 0

Thomas O'Dwyer (born 1950) is an Irish former hurler. At club level he played with Borris–Ileigh and was also a member of the Tipperary senior hurling team.

== Career ==
O'Dwyer first played hurling at juvenile and underage levels and was part of the team that won the club's inaugural Tipperary U21AHC title in 1969. His association with the club's senior team spanned three decades, during which time he won five North Tipperary SHC titles and three Tipperary SHC titles between 1972 and 1988. O'Dwyer was a non-playing substitute and selector when Borris–Ileigh beat Rathnure in the 1987 All-Ireland club final.

O'Dwyer first played for Tipperary at minor level before later joining the under-21 team, however, he enjoyed little success in these grades as Cork was the dominant team at the time. O'Dwyer was drafted onto the senior team's extended panel in 1972. After a period away from the team he returned to make several championship appearances in 1976 and 1977. His brother, Noel O'Dwyer, was a contemporary on the team.

== Honours ==
Borris–Ileigh

- All-Ireland Senior Club Hurling Championship: 1987
- Munster Senior Club Hurling Championship: 1986
- Tipperary Senior Hurling Championship: 1981, 1983, 1986
- North Tipperary Senior Hurling Championship: 1972, 1973, 1976, 1981, 1983
- Tipperary Under-21 A Hurling Championship: 1969
