= Pat Kavanagh (Kilkenny hurler) =

Irish hurler

Personal information
- Native name: Pádraig Caomhánach (Irish)
- Born: 10 November 1945 (age 80) Inistioge, County Kilkenny, Ireland
- Occupation: Veterinary surgeon
- Height: 5 ft 9 in (175 cm)

Sport
- Sport: Hurling
- Position: Right wing-forward
Clubs
- Years: Club
- 1963-1976 1964-1969 1977-1983: Rower–Inistioge → University College Dublin; Borris–Ileigh
College
- Years: College
- 1964-1969: University College Dublin
College titles
- Fitzgibbon titles: 2
Inter-county
- Years: County
- 1969-1973: Kilkenny
Inter-county titles
- Leinster titles: 2
- All-Irelands: 1
- NHL: 0
- All Stars: 0

Patrick Kavanagh (born 10 November 1945) is an Irish former hurler. He enjoyed a 20-year club career, lining out with Rower–Inistioge, University College Dublin and Borris–Ileigh, and was also a member of the Kilkenny senior hurling team.

== Career ==
Kavanagh first played hurling as a schoolboy with Good Counsel College in New Ross. He later studied at University College Dublin and won two Fitzgibbon Cup medals and a Dublin SHC title during his tenure there. Kavanagh began his club career by winning a Kilkenny JHC title with Rower-Inistioge in 1963 before later winning a Kilkenny SHC title in 1968. He subsequently transferred to the Borris–Ileigh club in Tipperary and ended his career by winning a Tipperary SHC medal in 1983.

Kavanagh first played for Kilkenny at minor level before later lining out with the under-21 team. He eventually progressed onto the senior team and came on as a substitute for Claus Dunne when Kilkenny beat Cork in the 1969 All-Ireland final. Kavanagh was again listed amongst the substitutes for Kilkenny's defeat by Limerick in the 1973 All-Ireland final. He later won an All-Ireland IHC title.

== Honours ==
University College Dublin

- Fitzgibbon Cup: 1968, 1969
- Dublin Senior Hurling Championship: 1968

Rower–Insitioge

- Kilkenny Senior Hurling Championship: 1968
- Kilkenny Junior Hurling Championship: 1963

Borris–Ileigh

- Tipperary Senior Hurling Championship: 1981, 1983
- North Tipperary Senior Hurling Championship: 1981, 1983

Kilkenny

- All-Ireland Senior Hurling Championship: 1969
- Leinster Senior Hurling Championship: 1969, 1973
- All-Ireland Intermediate Hurling Championship: 1973
- Leinster Intermediate Hurling Championship: 1973
