= Dan O'Grady (hurler) =

Tipperary hurler and Gaelic footballer (1946–2006)

Personal information
- Native name: Dónall Ó Gráda (Irish)
- Born: 1946 Moyne, County Tipperary, Ireland
- Died: 1 November 2006 (aged 60) Cork, Ireland
- Occupation: Accountant

Sport
- Sport: Hurling
- Position: Left corner-back
Club
- Years: Club
- Moyne–Templetuohy
Club titles
- Tipperary titles: 0
Inter-county
- Years: County
- 1969 1977: Tipperary (SH); Tipperary (SF)
Inter-county titles
- Munster titles: 0
- All-Irelands: 0
- NHL: 0
- All Stars: 0

Daniel O'Grady (1946 – 1 November 2006) was an Irish hurler and Gaelic footballer. At club level, he played with Moyne–Templetuohy and at inter-county level with the Tipperary senior teams as a dual player.

== Career ==
O'Grady began his club career at juvenile and underage levels with Moyne–Templetuohy. After winning divisional titles in the minor and underage grades, he progressed to adult level. O'Grady won a Tipperary JHC medal in 1965. He emigrated to England in 1969 and consequently missed out on the club's most successful era.

At inter-county level, O'Grady first played for Tipperary as part of the intermediate team in 1966. He won an All-Ireland U21HC medal after lining out at corner-back in the 1-08 to 1-07 win over Dublin in the 1967 All-Ireland under-21 final. O'Grady later lined out at senior level as a dual player.

== Death ==
O'Grady died on 1 November 2006, at the age of 60.

== Honours ==
Moyne–Templetuohy

- Tipperary Junior A Hurling Championship: 1965

Tipperary

- All-Ireland Under-21 Hurling Championship: 1967
- Munster Under-21 Hurling Championship: 1967
