= Conor Davitt =

Tipperary hurler

Personal information
- Native name: Conchúr Mac Daibhéid (Irish)
- Born: 1946 (age 79–80) Cashel, County Tipperary, Ireland

Sport
- Sport: Hurling
- Position: Midfield
Club
- Years: Club
- Cashel King Cormacs
Club titles
- Tipperary titles: 0
Inter-county
- Years: County
- 1967: Tipperary
Inter-county titles
- Munster titles: 0
- All-Irelands: 0
- NHL: 0

Conor Davitt (born 1946) is an Irish former hurler. At club level, he played with Cashel King Cormacs and at inter-county level with the Tipperary senior hurling team.

== Career ==
Davitt played hurling at all levels as a student at Cashel CBS, and won a Croke Cup title as vice-captain of the team in 1962 after a 5-02 to 5-00 win over Templmore CBS in the final.

Davitt began his club career with Cashel King Cormacs at juvenile and underage levels, before progressing to adult level. He won his first West Tipperary SHC medal in 1965 following a 2-18 to 4-03 win over Knockavilla Kickhams. Davitt claimed a second divisional winners' medal in 1971.

At inter-county level, Davitt first played for Tipperary during a two-year tenure with the under-21 team. He won an All-Ireland U21HC medal after lining out at midfield in the 1-08 to 1-07 win over Dublin in the 1967 All-Ireland under-21 final. Davitt was also a member of the senior team that year.

== Honours ==
Cashel CBS

- Croke Cup: 1962

Cashel King Cormacs

- West Tipperary Senior Hurling Championship: 1965, 1971

Tipperary

- All-Ireland Under-21 Hurling Championship: 1967
- Munster Under-21 Hurling Championship: 1967
