= Henry Condron =

Tipperary hurler and Gaelic footballer

Personal information
- Native name: Anraí O Conaráin (Irish)
- Born: 1946 (age 79–80) Moneygall, County Offaly, Ireland

Sport
- Sport: Hurling
- Position: Right corner-forward
Club
- Years: Club
- 1964-1990: Moneygall
Club titles
- Tipperary titles: 0
Inter-county
- Years: County
- 1966-1967: Tipperary
Inter-county titles
- Munster titles: 0
- All-Irelands: 0
- NFL: 0

Henry Condron (born 1946) is an Irish former hurler and Gaelic footballer. At club level, he played with Moneygall and at inter-county level with the Tipperary senior football team.

== Career ==
Condron first played hurling and Gaelic football at juvenile and underage levels with the Moneygall club. He was part of the club's under-21 team that won three successive North Tipperary U21FC titles between 1965 and 1967, as well as claiming the Tipperary U21FC title in 1965. By that stage, Condron had progressed to adult level and won a Tipperary JFC medal in 1964 after a replay defeat of Kilsheelan. He added a North Tipperary SFC medal to his collection in 1965.

At inter-county level, Condron first played for Tipperary as a dual player at under-21 level. He was goalkeeper on the under-21 hurling team that won the All-Ireland U21HC title after a 1-08 to 1-07 win over Dublin in the 1967 All-Ireland under-21 final. Condron also spent two seasons with the Tipperary senior football team.

== Honours ==
Moneygall

- North Tipperary Senior Football Championship: 1965
- Tipperary Junior Football Championship: 1964
- Tipperary Under-21 Football Championship: 1965
- North Tipperary Under-21 Football Championship: 1965, 1966, 1967

Tipperary

- All-Ireland Under-21 Hurling Championship: 1967
- Munster Under-21 Hurling Championship: 1967
