= Mick Ryan (Borris–Ileigh hurler) =

Irish hurler (born 1960)

Personal information
- Native name: Mícheál Ó Riain (Irish)
- Born: 1960 (age 65–66) Borrisoleigh, County Tipperary, Ireland
- Occupation: Farmer
- Height: 5 ft 9 in (175 cm)

Sport
- Sport: Hurling
- Position: Left corner-back
Club
- Years: Club
- Borris–Ileigh
Club titles
- Tipperary titles: 3
- Munster titles: 1
- All-Ireland Titles: 1
Inter-county
Years	County	Apps (scores)
1984-1984	Tipperary	0 (0-00)
Inter-county titles
- Munster titles: 0
- All-Irelands: 0
- NHL: 0
- All Stars: 0

Michael Ryan (born 1960) is an Irish former hurler. At club level he played with Borris–Ileigh and was also a member of the Tipperary senior hurling team.

== Career ==
Ryan played hurling as a schoolboy at Our Lady's Secondary School in Templemore where he won a Croke and Harty Cup double in 1978. He first played for Borris–Ileigh at juvenile and underage levels, before winning a divisional medal with the junior team in 1978. Ryan's career with the club's senior team spanned three decades, during which time he won three North Tipperary SHC titles and three Tipperary SHC titles. He was captain of the Borris–Ileigh team that beat Rathnure in the 1987 All-Ireland club final.

Ryan first played for Tipperary during a two-year tenure at minor level. He progressed to the under-21 team and won consecutive All-Ireland U21HC medals in 1980 and 1981. Ryan was drafted onto the senior team's extended panel in 1984.

== Honours ==
Templemore CBS

- Dr. Croke Cup: 1978
- Dr. Harty Cup: 1978

Borris–Ileigh

- All-Ireland Senior Club Hurling Championship: 1987 (c)
- Munster Senior Club Hurling Championship: 1986 (c)
- Tipperary Senior Hurling Championship: 1981, 1983, 1986 (c)
- North Tipperary Senior Hurling Championship: 1981, 1983, 1988
- North Tipperary Junior A Hurling Championship: 1978

Tipperary

- All-Ireland Under-21 Hurling Championship: 1980, 1981
- Munster Under-21 Hurling Championship: 1980, 1981

Achievements
Preceded by Tony Sheppard	All-Ireland Senior Club Hurling Final winning captain 1987	Succeeded by Ger Power
