= 1973–74 National Hurling League =

43rd season of the National Hurling League

League details
- Dates: 7 October 1973 – 5 May 1974

League champions
- Winners: Cork (10th win)
- Captain: John Horgan

The 1973–74 National Hurling League was the 43rd season of the National Hurling League.

== Division 1 ==
National Hurling League Division 1
- Season: 1973-74
- Champions: Cork; 10th National League title Captain: John Horgan; Manager: Willie John Daly
- Matches played: 60
- Top goalscorer: Pat Quigley (2-49)
- All statistics correct as of 12 March 2017.

Wexford came into the season as defending champions of the 1972-73 season.

On 5 May 1974, Cork won the title following a 6–15 to 1–12 win over Limerick in the final. It was their 10th league title overall and their first since 1971-72.

Dublin's Pat Quigley was the Division 1 top scorer with 2-49.

=== Division 1A table ===
Pos	Team	Pld	W	D	L	Diff	Pts	Notes
1	Cork	7	5	1	1	+28	11	Division 1 champions
2	Limerick	7	4	2	1	+30	10	Division 1 runners-up
3	Tipperary	7	4	0	3	+10	8	
4	Waterford	7	3	1	3	+3	7	
5	Wexford	7	3	0	4	-2	6	
6	Clare	7	3	0	4	-13	6	
7	Kilkenny	7	1	2	4	-6	4	
8	Galway	7	2	0	5	-50	4	Relegated to Division 1B

=== Group stage ===
7 October 1973	Wexford	1-14 - 2-9	Cork	Wexford Park, Wexford
	T Byrne 0-5, S Kinsella 1-1, C Kehoe 0-2, M Butler 0-2, D Quigley 0-1, D Bernie 0-1, M Casey 0-1, T Doran 0-1.		C McCarthy 0-7, S O'Leary 1-0, D Relihan 1-0, G McCarthy 0-1, J Buckley 0-1.	Referee: N Dalton (Waterford)

7 October 1973	Kilkenny	5-7 - 4-11	Tipperary	Nowlan Park, Kilkenny
	M Brennan 1-1, F Cooke 1-1, F Cleere 1-0, J Walsh 1-0, S Muldowney 1-0, P Kavanagh 0-3, R Burke 0-1, P Lalor 0-1.		J Flanagan 3-4, J Carey 1-2, F Murphy 1-1, PJ Ryan 0-1, S Hogan 0-1, L McGrath 0-1, E Butler 0-1.	Referee: J Rankins (Laois)

7 October 1973	Galway	2-6 - 2-13	Waterford	Kenny Park, Athenry
	PJ Molloy 1-0, T Murphy 1-0, M Connolly 0-5, F Burke 0-1.		M Hickey 1-4, P O'Grady 0-6, A Heffernan 1-0, M Geary 0-2, L Canning 0-1.	Referee: M Slattery (Clare)

7 October 1973	Clare	0-14 - 3-9	Limerick	Cusack Park, Ennis
	P Russell 0-10, J Callinan 0-1, N Casey 0-1, M McKeogh 0-1.		R Bennis 1-5, M Dowling 1-1, E Grimes 1-0, L O'Donoghue 0-2, E Cregan 0-1, F Nolan 0-1.	Referee: J MOloney (Tipperary)

21 October 1973	Limerick	3-7 - 1-13	Kilkenny	Gaelic Grounds, Limerick
	E Grimes 1-2, J McKenna 1-0, M Dowling 1-0, R Bennis 0-2, L O'Donoghue 0-1, P Fitzmaurice 0-1, F Nolan 0-1.		E Keher 0-6, P Delaney 1-1, L O'Brien 0-2, W Harte 0-2, M Crotty 0-2.	Referee: M Slattery (Clare)

21 October 1973	Tipperary	3-10 - 4-8	Wexford	Semple Stadium, Thurles
	J Kehoe 1-3, J Flanagan 0-6, J Tynan 1-0, S Carey 1-0, F Murphy 0-1.		T Byrne 1-4, S Kinsella 1-0, T Doran 1-0, M Casey 1-0, M Quigley 0-1, M Butler 0-1.	Referee: S O'Grady (Limerick)

21 October 1973	Waterford	1-16 - 3-4	Clare	Walsh Park, Waterford
	P O'Grady 0-7, L Canning 1-3, M Geary 0-2, S Greene 0-1, J Greene 0-1, T Reid 0-1, M Hickey 0-1.		T Ryan 2-0, N Casey 1-0, P Russell 0-3, M McKeogh 0-1.	Referee: R Dowling (Kilkenny)

21 October 1973	Cork	1-12 - 0-10	Galway	Cork Athletic Grounds, Cork
	C McCarthy 1-6, C Roche 0-1, P Moylan 0-1, S O'Leary 0-1, D Relihan 0-1, T Buckley 0-1, D Clifford 0-1.		F Burke 0-4, I Clarke 0-2, PJ Molloy 0-2, G Glynn 0-1, F O'Donoghue 0-1.	Referee: J Dunphy (Waterford)

4 November 1973	Galway	2-5 - 4-10	Limerick	Ballinasloe
	J Connolly 2-3, S Silke 0-1, T Brehony 0-1.		M Ruth 1-5, M Dowling 1-1, N Rea 1-0, L O'Donoghue 0-1, L Enright 0-1, F Nolan 0-1, T McAuliffe 0-1.	Referee: M Spain (Offaly)

4 November 1973	Kilkenny	1-12 - 3-9	Cork	Nowlan Park, Kilkenny
	K Purcell 1-1, E Keher 0-4, P Delaney 0-2, W Fitzpatrick 0-1, M Brennan 0-1, L O'Brien 0-1, W Harte 0-1, P Henderson 0-1.		S O'Leary 1-1, T O'Brien 1-1, C McCarthy 0-4, P Moylan 1-0, G McCarthy 0-2, J McCarthy 0-1.	Referee: N Dalton (Waterford)

4 November 1973	Wexford	2-8 - 3-10	Waterford	O'Kennedy Park, New Ross
	T Byrne 1-3, M Casey 1-0, M Quigley 0-3, C Keogh 0-1, M Jacob 0-1.		P O'Grady 0-7, M Geary 1-1, S Greene 1-1, L Cunning 1-0, M Hickey 0-1.

4 November 1973	Clare	1-11 - 1-9	Tipperary	Daly Park, Tulla
	T Ryan 1-3, J Callinan 0-4, M Moroney 0-2, E O'Connor 0-1, N Ryan 0-1.		S Hogan 1-3, N O'Dwyer 0-4, P Williams 0-1, F Murphy 0-1.	Referee: S O'Grady (Limerick)

18 November 1973	Cork	7-12 - 3-7	Clare	Cork Athletic Grounds, Cork
	C McCarthy 1-5, R Cummins 2-1, E O'Donoghue 2-0, S O'Leary 2-0, D Collins 0-2, J Horgan 0-1, C Roche 0-1, D Coughlan 0-1, J McCarthy 0-1.		N Casey 1-1, M O'Connor 1-0, N Ryan 1-0, T Ryan 0-2, M McKeogh 0-2, J Cullinane 0-2.	Referee: N Dalton (Waterford)

18 November 1973	Tipperary	4-11 - 2-4	Galway	MacDonagh Park, Cloughjordan
	J Flanagan 1-5, J Tynan 1-2, R Ryan 1-0, S Power 1-0, S Hogan 0-2, M Keating 0-2.		J Faul 1-1, G Glynn 1-0, J Connolly 0-2, P Fahy 0-1.	Referee: M Spain (Offaly)

18 November 1973	Waterford	2-12 - 1-15	Kilkenny	Walsh Park, Waterford
	P O'Grady 0-10, A Heffernan 1-0, S Greene 1-0, L Canning 0-1, M Geary 0-1.		E Keher 0-10, P Delaney 1-1, W Harte 0-2, M Crotty 0-1, L O'Brien 0-1.	Referee: F Murphy (Cork)

2 December 1973	Kilkenny	3-14 - 2-10	Wexford	Nowlan Park, Kilkenny
	E Keher 1-4, L O'Brien 1-2, M Crotty 1-2, P Delaney 0-4, M Brennan 0-2.		T Byrne 1-1, J Berry 1-1, S Kinsella 0-3, C Keogh 0-2, M Furlong 0-2, M Quigley 0-1.	Referee: J Moloney (Tipperary)

2 December 1973	Cork	2-12 - 1-12	Tipperary	Cork Athletic Grounds, Cork
	C McCarthy 1-4, J McCarthy 0-4, G McCarthy 1-0, E O'Donoghue 0-2, R Cummins 0-1, D Coughlan 0-1.		S Power 1-0, F Loughnane 0-3, J Flanagan 0-3, M Keating 0-2, N O'Dwyer 0-2, S Hogan 0-2.	Referee: M Slattery (Clare)

2 December 1973	Waterford	1-6 - 4-10	Limerick	Fraher Field, Dungarvan
	M Geary 1-1, P O'Grady 0-4, M Whelan 0-1.		M Ruth 2-3, R Bennis 0-5, J McKenna 1-0, F Nolan 1-0, E Grimes 0-1, M Dolwing 0-1.	Referee: P Johnston (Kilkenny)

2 December 1973	Clare	5-7 - 0-4	Galway	Daly Park, Tulla
	M O'Connor 2-0, G Lohan 2-0, N Ryan 1-1, T Ryan 0-4, J Callinan 0-1, M Moroney 0-1.		J Connolly 0-3, G Glynn 0-1.

9 December 1973	Limerick	1-11 - 1-9	Wexford	Gaelic Grounds, Limerick
	R Bennis 0-7, L O'Donoghue 1-0, M Ruth 0-2, J McKenna 0-1, P Fitzmaurice 0-1.		A Wildes 1-1, S Kinsella 0-4, T Byrne 0-2, J Berry 0-1, M Casey 0-1.	Referee: F Murphy (Cork)

10 February 1974	Wexford	2-11 - 0-3	Clare	Enniscorthy
	R Kinsella 1-4, T Byrne 1-0, M Quigley 0-3, A Wildes 0-2, W Murphy 0-1, T Doran 0-1.		J Cullinan 0-2, C Woods 0-1.	Referee: N Dalton (Waterford)

10 February 1974	Limerick	0-10 - 2-4	Cork	Gaelic Grounds, Limerick
	R Bennis 0-7, M Dowling 0-2, E Grimes 0-1.		E O'Donoghue 1-0, C Roche 1-0, C McCarthy 0-1, J Buckley 0-1, W Walsh 0-1, G McCarthy 0-1.	Referee: J Moloney (Tipperary)

10 February 1974	Tipperary	1-10 - 2-6	Waterford	Gaelic Grounds, Limerick
	F Loughnane 0-6, J Flanagan 1-0, PJ Ryan 0-1, J Kehoe 0-1, R Ryan 0-1, M Keating 0-1.		P O'Grady 1-5, A Heffernan 1-0, L Canning 0-1.	Referee: F Murphy (Cork)

10 February 1974	Galway	1-10 - 1-9	Kilkenny	Ballinasloe
	J Connolly 0-5, PJ Qualter 1-1, G Holland 0-2, S Silke 0-1, A Fenton 0-1.		M Brennan 1-1, E Keher 0-2, P Delaney 0-2, L O'Brien 0-2, B Fitzpatrick 0-1, P Broderick 0-1.	Referee: M Spain (Offaly)

24 February 1974	Clare	2-9 - 0-7	Kilkenny	Daly Park, Tulla
	T Ryan 1-2, J Callinan 1-2, C Woods 0-2, M Moroney 0-1, N Ryan 0-1, N Casey 0-1.		P Henderson 0-2, L O'Brien 0-2, E Keher 0-1, T Teehan 0-1, M Brennan 0-1.	Referee: S O'Grady (Limerick)

24 February 1974	Waterford	0-9 - 1-8	Cork	Fraher Field, Dungarvan
	P O'Grady 0-5, M Hickey 0-1, S Greene 0-1, J Galvin 0-1, J Greene 0-1.		C McCarthy 0-5, E O'Donoghue 1-0, D Coughlan 0-1, J Buckley 0-1, S O'Leary 0-1.	Referee: S O'Connor (Waterford)

24 February 1974	Tipperary	1-14 - 1-13	Limerick	Gaelic Grounds, Limerick
	F Loughnane 0-7, S Power 1-0, M Keating 0-3, J Flanagan 0-3, J Kehoe 0-1.		M Ruth 1-4, R Bennis 0-5, F Nolan 0-1, L O'Donoghue 0-1, N Rea 0-1.	Referee: F Murphy (Cork)

24 February 1974	Galway	2-13 - 2-9	Wexford	Ballinasloe
	J Connolly 1-7, PJ Molloy 1-1, M Barrett 0-2, P Ryan 0-1, PJ Qualter 0-1, S Murphy 0-1.		T Byrne 1-2, M Casey 1-1, W Murphy 0-3, M Jacob 0-1, S Kinsella 0-1, R Kinsella 0-1.

=== Division 1B table ===
Pos	Team	Pld	W	D	L	Diff	Pts	Notes
1	Dublin	7	6	1	0	+54	14	Promoted to Division 1A
2	Kildare	6	5	0	1	+67	10	
3	Offaly	7	5	0	2	+25	10	
4	Laois	7	4	0	3	+25	8	
5	Antrim	7	3	0	4	+4	6	
6	Wicklow	7	2	0	5	-61	4	
7	Westmeath	7	1	0	6	-77	2	Relegated to Division 2
8	Kerry	6	0	0	6	-53	0	Relegated to Division 2

=== Group stage ===
7 October 1973	Dublin	2-11 - 0-10	Kildare	Croke Park, Dublin
	M Bermingham 1-4, P Quigley 0-5, L Deegan 1-0, V Holden 0-1, E Davey 0-1.		J Walsh 0-6, T Carew 0-2, M Deely 0-1, J O'Leary 0-1.	Referee: J McElheron (Wicklow)

7 October 1973	Offaly	2-7 - 2-5	Laois	St. Brendan's Park, Birr
	K Mooney 1-0, D Hanniffy 1-0, P Corcoran 0-3, B Moylan 0-2, PJ Whelehan 0-1, P Mulhaire 0-1.		P Kelly 1-0, G Cuddy 1-0, S Cuddy 0-2, M Walsh 0-1, P Kavanagh 0-1, G Lenihan 0-1.	Referee: J O'Grady (Limerick)

7 October 1973	Westmeath	1-14 - 1-5	Kerry	Cusack Park, Mullingar
	J Keary 1-3, M Flanagan 0-6, E Fagan 0-2, P Duignan 0-1, F McManus 0-1, L Maher 0-1.		J Thornton 1-0, P Costello 0-1, J McGrath 0-1, J Donovan 0-1, J Fitzsimons 0-1, P McCarthy 0-1.	Referee: B Lowth (Dublin)

7 October 1973	Wicklow	2-6 - 4-11	Antrim	Aughrim County Ground, Aughrim

21 October 1973	Kerry	2-7 - 2-18	Dublin	Austin Stack Park, Tralee
	T Nolan 1-4, B O'Connell 1-0, P Moriarty 0-2, T Lyons 0-1.		P Quigley 1-5, V Holden 0-4, D Walsh 1-0, M Bermingham 0-2, E Davey 0-2, T Grealish 0-2, L Martin 0-2, H Dalton 0-1.	Referee: J Quaid (Limerick)

21 October 1973	Antrim	6-14 - 1-12	Westmeath	Waterfoot
	W Richmond 3-4, B Patterson 2-2, M McKillop 1-4, E Doran 0-2, M McKearney 0-1, J Jamsion 0-1.		J Keary 1-5, M McKeogh 0-3, E Clarke 0-1, J Davis 0-1, L Maher 0-1, C Connaughton 0-1.	Referee: E Devlin (Tyrone)

21 October 1973	Kildare	4-11 - 2-15	Offaly	Naas
	J Walsh 0-5, N Walshe 1-1, J Wall 1-0, J O'Leary 1-0, M Deely 1-0, B Burke 0-3, J O'Connell 0-2.		B Moylan 1-8, J Kirwan 1-1, P Corcoran 0-2, K Mooney 0-1, D Hanniffy 0-1, J Herman 0-1, P de Loughrey 0-1.

4 November 1973	Laois	2-4 - 4-7	Kildare	O'Moore Park, Portlaoise
			J Walsh 1-4, J O'Leary 2-0, E Walsh 1-0, R Burke 0-1, J O'Connell 0-1, M Deeley 0-1.	Referee: T Qualter (Galway)

4 November 1973	Offaly	2-11 - 2-9	Kerry	St. Brendan's Park, Birr
	B Moylan 1-3, K Mooney 1-1, L Carroll 0-3, J Kirwin 0-1, P Moloughney 0-1, M Cleere 0-1, P Mulhaire 0-1.		T Kenny 1-5, T Lyons 1-1, PJ McIntyre 0-3.	Referee: J Rankins (Laois)

4 November 1973	Wicklow	4-5 - 3-5	Westmeath	Aughrim County Ground, Aughrim
	T McCarthy 2-0, S O'Brien 1-2, A Byrne 1-1, A Doyle 0-1, N Pearson 0-1.		E Clarke 2-0, M Flanagan 1-1, M McKeogh 0-2, K Gavin 0-2.	Referee: M Bowe (Wexford)

11 November 1973	Dublin	3-15 - 1-8	Antrim	Croke Park, Dublin
	P Quigley 0-8, J Towell 2-0, D Walsh 1-1, E Davey 0-3, T Grealish 0-2, V Holden 0-1.		R McDonnell 1-4, E Dornan 0-3, J Jameson 0-1.	Referee: G Kirwan (Offaly)

18 November 1973	Westmeath	1-5 - 3-13	Dublin	Cusack Park, Mullingar
	M Finnegan 1-1, L Maher 0-3, C Connaughton 0-1.		P Quigley 0-7, E Davey 1-2, D Walsh 1-2, J Towell 1-0, H Dillon 0-1, J Grealish 0-1.	Referee: G Kirwan (Offaly)

18 November 1973	Kildare	3-17 - 2-2	Wicklow	St. Conleth's Park, Newbridge
	J Walsh 0-8, J Wall 2-2, N Walsh 1-1, M Deeley 0-3, T Carew 0-2, B Burke 0-1.		M Kennedy 1-1, S O'Brien 1-0, M O'Brien 0-1.

18 November 1973	Kerry	0-9 - 2-9	Laois	Austin Stack Park, Tralee
	T Kenny 0-4, M O'Sullivan 0-3, PJ McIntyre 0-1, B Healy 0-1.		P Mahon 2-1, P Dillon 0-5, P Kavanagh 0-2, M Walsh 0-1.	Referee: J Quaid (Limerick)

18 November 1973	Antrim	1-11 - 2-14	Offaly	Waterfoot
	E Donnelly 0-6, R McDonnell 1-0, E Dornan 0-1, M McKearney 0-1, M McKillop 0-1, B Patterson 0-1, W Richmond 0-1.		B Moylan 0-8, D Hanniffy 1-1, K Mooney 1-0, J Kirwin 0-1, PJ Whelehan 0-1, J Kinsella 0-1, P Mulhaire 0-1, P Horan 0-1.	Referee: B Louth (Dublin)

2 December 1973	Dublin	5-19 - 2-6	Wicklow	Croke Park, Dublin
	P Quigley 1-9, E Davey 1-7, V Holden 1-2, T Grealish 1-1, D Walsh 1-0.		J O'Sullivan 2-0, A Byrne 0-4, P Kennedy 0-1, S O'Brien 0-1.	Referee: D Robinson (Kildare)

2 December 1973	Laois	6-10 - 3-5	Antrim	Fr. Breen Park, Abbeyleix
	F Keenan 2-1, P Dowling 1-2, J Mahon 0-5, P Dillon 1-0, L O'Shuaghnessy 1-0, A LAnham 1-0, L Mahon 0-1, P Kavanagh 0-1.		W Richmond 1-1, B Patterson 1-0, E Dornan 1-0, M McKillop 0-2, K McGinty 0-1, R McDonnell 0-1.	Referee: C Kirwan (Offaly)

9 December 1973	Laois	4-16 - 3-4	Wicklow	Fr. Breen Park, Abbeyleix
	M Mahon 2-5, F Keenan 1-2, A Lanhaqm 1-1, P Dillon 0-3, P Dowling 0-2, J Mahon 0-2, P Kavanagh 0-1.		M Kennedy 1-2, S Kehoe 1-0, S Brennan 1-0, P Breen 0-2.	Referee: G Kirwan (Offaly)

16 December 1973	Offaly	6-9 - 3-3	Westmeath	St. Brendan's Park, Birr
	J Kirwan 3-0, M Cleere 1-5, P Corcoran 1-2, PJ Whelehan 1-0, K Mooney 0-1, J Kinsella 0-1.		J Davis 1-0, N Clarke 1-0, E Clarke 1-0, L Maher 0-2, M McKeogh 0-1.	Referee: J Rankins (Laois)

10 February 1974	Wicklow	3-7 - 2-4	Kerry	Pearse Park, Arklow
	A Byrne 2-2, M Kennedy 1-0, S Doyle 0-2, T Kennedy 0-2, T Collins 0-1.		J McGrath 2-0, P Moriarty 0-2, P Costello 0-1, J O'Sullivan 0-1.	Referee: B Louth (Dublin)

10 February 1974	Kildare	5-12 - 3-4	Antrim	Naas
	N Walshe 2-3, J Wall 1-1, T Carew 1-1, J Walshe 0-4, J O'Leary 1-0, F Deering 0-1, J O'Connell 0-1, M Deeley 0-1.		M McKillop 1-2, W Richmond 1-0, E Donnelly 1-0, R McDonnell 0-1, I Lewsley 0-1.	Referee: T Somerville (Dublin)

10 February 1974	Dublin	3-12 - 4-7	Offaly	Croke Park, Dublin
	E Davey 1-5, P Quigley 0-6, T Grealish 1-0, V Holden 1-0, G Ryan 0-1.		B Moylan 1-2, H Dolan 1-1, P Corcoran 1-1, P Mulhaire 1-0, PJ Whelehan 0-2, P Horan 0-1.	Referee: J Rankins (Laois)

10 February 1974	Westmeath	1-5 - 1-8	Laois	Castletown Geoghegan
	J Davis 1-0, T Corrigan 0-2, M Fagan 0-2, N Clarke 0-1.		F Keenan 1-4, P Dillon 0-2, J Mahon 0-1, M Carroll 0-1.	Referee: G Kirwan (Offaly)

24 February 1974	Kildare	9-22 - 2-9	Westmeath	Geraldine Park, Athy
	N Walsh 3-2, J Walsh 2-7, T Carew 2-3, M Deely 2-2, B Burke 0-3, J O'Leary 0-3, J O'Connor 0-1, J Wall 0-1.		E Clarke 2-3, F Shields 0-2, F Gavin 0-2, S Fagan 0-1, W Shanley 0-1.	Referee: B Lowth (Dublin)

24 February 1974	Laois	2-6 - 1-11	Dublin	Fr. Breen Park, Abbeyleix
	M Mahon 1-0, M Morrissey 1-0, P Dillon 0-3, G Lanham 0-2, F Keenan 0-1.		P Quigley 0-5, T Grealish 1-0, H Dalton 0-3, M Bermingham 0-1, N Kinsella 0-1, E Davey 0-1.	Referee: P Johnston (Kilkenny)

24 February 1974	Offaly	2-6 - 1-5	Wicklow	St. Brendan's Park, Birr
	S O'Brien 2-0, M Cleere 0-4, K Mooney 0-1, J Cleary 0-1.		T McCarthy 1-0, A Byrne 0-2, S Doyle 0-2, G Byrne 0-1.

24 February 1974	Kerry	2-2 - 5-13	Antrim	Austin Stack Park, Tralee
	T Kenny 2-1, S Geary 0-1.		E Donnelly 1-6, B Patterson 2-2, E Dornan 1-0, I Lowsley 1-0, M McKillop 0-2, J O'Neill 0-2, W Richmond 0-1.

=== Knock-out stage ===
Quarter-finals

10 March 1974 Quarter-final	Tipperary	2-16 - 2-10	Kildare	Semple Stadium, Thurles
14:00	F Loughnane (1-6), M Keating (1-4), J Kehoe (0-3), J Lynam (0-2), S Power (0-1).		J O'Leary (2-1), J Walsh (0-5), N Walsh (0-2), M Deely (0-1), J O'Connell (0-1).	Attendance: 4,000; Referee: F Murphy (Cork)

10 March 1974 Quarter-final	Waterford	2-5 - 2-10	Dublin	Semple Stadium, Thurles
15:30	M Ormonde (1-1), P O'Grday (0-4), L Canning (1-0).		M Bermingham (1-7), N Kinsella (1-1), E Davey (0-1), R Walsh (0-1).	Attendance: 4,000; Referee: S O'Connor (Limerick)

Semi-finals

7 April 1974 Semi-final	Dublin	1-11 - 0-18	Cork	Croke Park, Dublin
14:15	D Walsh (1-1), P Quigley (0-4), M Bermingham (0-3), N Kinsella (0-2), E Davey (0-1).		C McCarthy (0-8), S O'Leary (0-3), É O'Donoghue (0-2), C Roche (0-2), G McCarthy (0-1), J McCarthy (0-1), D Coughlan (0-1).	Referee: N. Dalton (Waterford)

21 April 1974 Semi-final	Limerick	1-16 - 3-8	Tipperary	Gaelic Grounds, Limerick
15:30	N Rea (1-4), R Bennis (0-4), J McKenna (0-3), F Nolan (0-2), L O'Donoghue (0-2), É Grimes (0-1).		F Loughnane (2-5), J Kehoe (1-1), M Keating (0-2).	Attendance: 26,280; Referee: M. Spain (Offaly)

Final

5 May 1974 Final	Limerick	1-12 - 6-15	Cork	Gaelic Grounds, Limerick
15:30	R Bennis (0-4), N Rea (1-0), F Nolan (0-3), É Grimes (0-3), M Ruth (0-1), L O'Donoghue (0-1).		É O'Donoghue (3-0), G McCarthy (0-8), S O'Leary (1-2), C McCarthy (1-1), T O'Brien (1-0), M Malone (0-3), J Buckley (0-1).	Attendance: 25,100; Referee: P Johnston (Kilkenny)

=== Scoring statistics ===
Top scorers overall

Rank	Player	Team	Tally	Total	Matches	Average
1	Pat Quigley	Dublin	2-49	55	8	6.87
2	Charlie McCarthy	Cork	4-41	53	9	5.88
3	Johnny Walsh	Kildare	3-39	48	7	6.85
4	Pat O'Grady	Waterford	1-44	47	7	6.71
5	Richie Bennis	Limerick	1-39	42	8	5.25

Top scorers in a single game

Rank	Player	Team	Tally	Total	Opposition
1	John Flanagan	Tipperary	3-04	13	Kilkenny
1	Willie Richmond	Antrim	3-04	13	Westmeath
1	Johnny Walsh	Kildare	2-07	13	Westmeath
4	Pat Quigley	Dublin	1-09	12	Wicklow
5	Ned Walsh	Kildare	3-02	11	Westmeath
5	Francis Loughnane	Tipperary	2-05	11	Limnerick
5	Mick Mahon	Laois	2-05	11	Wicklow
5	Barney Moylan	Offaly	1-08	11	Kildare
9	Mick Bermingham	Dublin	1-07	10	Waterford
9	Eugene Davey	Dublin	1-07	10	Wicklow
9	John Connolly	Galway	1-07	10	Wexford
9	Pascal Russell	Clare	0-10	10	Limerick
9	Pat O'Grady	Waterford	0-10	10	Kilkenny
9	Eddie Keher	Kilkenny	0-10	10	Waterford
