= Noel O'Dwyer =

Irish hurler (born 1948)

Personal information
- Native name: Nollaig Ó Duibhir (Irish)
- Born: 26 December 1948 (age 77) Borrisoleigh, County Tipperary, Ireland
- Occupation: Sales manager
- Height: 6 ft 0 in (183 cm)

Sport
- Sport: Hurling
- Position: Centre-forward
Club
- Years: Club
- 1966-1988: Borris–Ileigh
Club titles
- Tipperary titles: 3
- Munster titles: 1
- All-Ireland Titles: 1
Inter-county
Years	County	Apps (scores)
1968-1985	Tipperary	25 (5-22)
Inter-county titles
- Munster titles: 2
- All-Irelands: 1
- NHL: 1
- All Stars: 0

Noel O'Dwyer (born 26 December 1948) is an Irish former hurler. At club level he played with Borris–Ileigh and was also a member of the Tipperary senior hurling team.

== Career ==
O'Dwyer played hurling as a schoolboy at Templemore CBS where he won a Dr. Kinane Cup and three successive Dr. Croke Cup titles. He first played for Borris–Ileigh at juvenile and underage levels and was part of the team that won the club's inaugural Tipperary U21AHC title in 1969. O'Dwyer spent over 20 years with the club's senior team and won six North Tipperary SHC titles and three Tipperary SHC titles between 1972 and 1988. He was at centre-forward on the Borris–Ileigh team that beat Rathnure in the 1987 All-Ireland club final.

O'Dwyer first played for Tipperary at minor level in 1966. He won an All-Ireland U21HC medal in the first of his three consecutive seasons with the under-21 team in 1967. O'Dwyer was drafted onto the senior team in 1968 and was at centre-forward when the team beat Kilkenny by 5-17 to 5-14 in the 1971 All-Ireland final. Much of his senior career coincided with a barren spell for Tipperary, however, he won a National League title in 1979. O'Dwyer also won two Railway Cup medals with Munster. In retirement from playing he served as a senior team selector under Babs Keating.

== Honours ==
=== Player ===
Borris–Ileigh

- All-Ireland Senior Club Hurling Championship: 1987
- Munster Senior Club Hurling Championship: 1986
- Tipperary Senior Hurling Championship: 1981, 1983, 1986
- North Tipperary Senior Hurling Championship: 1972, 1973, 1976, 1981, 1983, 1988
- Tipperary Under-21 A Hurling Championship: 1969

Tipperary

- All-Ireland Senior Hurling Championship: 1971
- Munster Senior Hurling Championship: 1969, 1971
- National Hurling League: 1978-79
- All-Ireland Under-21 Hurling Championship: 1967
- Munster Under-21 Hurling Championship: 1967

Munster

- Railway Cup: 1970, 1976

=== Management ===
Tipperary

- National Hurling League: 1993-94
