= Noel Seymour =

Irish hurler (born 1945)

Noel Syemour
Personal information
- Native name: Nollaig Saomar (Irish)
- Born: 1945 (age 80–81) Puckane, County Tipperary, Ireland

Sport
- Sport: Hurling
- Position: Full-back
Club
- Years: Club
- Kiladangan
Club titles
- Tipperary titles: 0
Inter-county
- Years: County
- 1966-1971: Tipperary
Inter-county titles
- Munster titles: 0
- All-Irelands: 0
- NHL: 0

William Noel Seymour (born 1945) is an Irish former hurler. At club level he played with Kiladangan and was also a member of the Tipperary senior hurling team.

== Career ==
Seymour first played hurling as a schoolboy with the North Tipperary vocational school team that won Munster and All-Ireland titles in 1962. He also played at juvenile and underage levels with the Kiladangan club. Seymour progressed to adult level and was part of the Kiladangan team that won the Tipperary JAHC title in 1971. He also won four North Tipperary IHC titles between 1966 and 1980.

Seymour first appeared on the inter-county scene as a member of the Tipperary minor hurling team in 1963. He later spent two consecutive seasons with the under-21 team and was a non-playing substitute when Tipperary were beaten by Wexford in the 1964 All-Ireland under-21 final. Seymour was called into the senior team in 1966 and played in a number of National League and Oireachtas Tournament games. He lined out with the senior team again at various times between 1969 and 1971. Seymour captained the intermediate team to victory over Galway in the 1972 All-Ireland intermediate final.

== Honours ==
Newport

- North Tipperary Intermediate Hurling Championship: 1966, 1971, 1977, 1980
- Tipperary Junior A Hurling Championship: 1971

Tipperary

- All-Ireland Intermediate Hurling Championship: 1972 (c)
- Munster Intermediate Hurling Championship: 1972
- Munster Under-21 Hurling Championship: 1965

Sporting positions
Preceded by Paddy Kelly	Tipperary intermediate hurling team captain 1972	Succeeded by
Achievements
Preceded by Éamonn Butler	All-Ireland Intermediate Hurling Final winning captain 1972	Succeeded by Paddy Grace
