= 1982 Tipperary Senior Hurling Championship =

Annual hurling competition season

- Dates: 8 August - 3 October 1982
- Teams: 8
- Champions: Moycarkey-Borris (11th title); Jack Bergin (captain); Len Gaynor (manager)
- Runners-up: Roscrea; Peadar Queally (captain); Patsy Rowland (manager)

Tournament statistics
- Matches played: 9
- Goals scored: 22 (2.44 per match)
- Points scored: 180 (20 per match)
- Top scorer(s): Peadar Queally (1-26)

The 1982 Tipperary Senior Hurling Championship was the 91st staging of the Tipperary Senior Hurling Championship since its establishment by the Tipperary County Board in 1887.

Borris-Ileigh were the defending champions.

Moycarkey-Borris won the championship after a 2–12 to 0–11 defeat of Roscrea in a final replay at Semple Stadium. It was their 11th championship title overall and their first title since 1940.

== Results ==
=== Quarter-finals ===
8 August 1982 Quarter-final	Moycarkey-Borris	1-08 - 0-11	Nenagh Éire Óg	Semple Stadium
	J McCormack 1-1, John Flanagan 0-4, E Darmody 0-1, J Caesar 0-1, T Quigley 0-1.		C O'Donovan 0-4, J O'Sullivan 0-2, J Heffernan 0-2, M Kennedy 0-2, R Ashman 0-1.

8 August 1982 Quarter-final	Roscrea	5-17 - 1-08	Drom-Inch	Semple Stadium
	J Butler 3-1, P Queally 1-8, G O'Connor 1-3, F Loughnane 0-4, R Dunne 0-1.		J Harkin 1-7, P Looby 0-1.

8 August 1982 Quarter-final	Seán Treacys	1-13 - 1-07	St. Mary's	Boherlahan Grounds
	J Carey 1-3, P Quigley 0-5, D Browne 0-2, D Carey 0-2, G Doyle 0-1.		W Peters 0-5, J Redmond 1-0, T Smith 0-1, M Carroll 0-1.

8 August 1982 Quarter-final	Kickhams	1-10 - 1-04	St. Augustine's	Boherlahan Grounds
	D Hayes 1-1, M McGrath 0-4, M Hennessy 0-4, J Hennessy 0-1.		J Kehoe 1-1, S Nugent 0-1, AB Kennedy 0-1, L Stokes 0-1.

15 August 1982 Quarter-final replay	Moycarkey-Borris	0-11 - 0-07	Nenagh Éire Óg	MacDonagh Park
	John Flanagan 0-3, J McCormack 0-3, J Caesar 0-2, L Bergin 0-1, T Quigley 0-1, E Darmody 0-1.		C O'Donovan 0-2, M Ryan 0-1, M Kennedy 0-1, J Heffernan 0-1, P Kennedy 0-1, R Coffey 0-1.

=== Semi-finals ===
22 August 1982 Semi-final	Moycarkey-Borris	3-08 - 0-05	Kickhams	Semple Stadium
	J Caesar 2-2, D Quigley 1-1, John Flanagan 0-4, T Quigley 0-1.		D Hayes 0-3, M McGrath 0-1, G Coulihan 0-1.

22 August 1982 Semi-final	Roscrea	1-14 - 1-10	Seán Treacys	Semple Stadium
	P Queally 0-6, F Loughane 1-2, L Spooner 0-3, R Dunne 0-2, G O'Connor 0-1.		P Quigley 0-5, L Ryan 1-0, J Carey 0-2, D Brown 0-1, D Carey 0-1, T Griffin 0-1.

=== Final ===
3 October 1982 Final	Moycarkey-Borris	3-09 - 1-15	Roscrea	Semple Stadium
	John Flanagan 0-7, T Quigley 1-0, D Quigley 1-0, J Caesar 1-0, D Fogarty 0-1, J McCormack 0-1.		P Queally 0-6, G O'Connor 0-4, F Loughnane 0-4, J Butler 1-0, P Loughnane 0-1.	Referee: J Ryan (Lattin-Cullen)

3 October 1982 Final replay	Moycarkey-Borris	2-12 - 0-11	Roscrea	Semple Stadium
	John Flanagan 1-5, D Quigley 1-2, T Quigley 0-2, Jim Flanagan 0-1, J Caesar 0-1, D Fogarty 0-1.		P Queally 0-6, J Tynan 0-2, L Spooner 0-1, G O'Connor 0-1, F Loughnane 0-1.	Referee: J Ryan (Lattin-Cullen)

== Championship statistics ==
=== Top scorers ===
Overall

Rank	Player	Club	Tally	Total	Matches	Average
1	Peadar Queally	Roscrea	1-26	29	4	7.25
2	John Flanagan	Moycarkey-Borris	1-23	26	5	5.20
3	Jack Caesar	Moycarkey-Borris	3-06	15	5	3.00
4	Francis Loughnane	Roscrea	1-11	14	4	3.50
5	Joe Butler	Roscrea	4-01	13	4	3.25
6	Dick Quigley	Moycarkey-Borris	3-03	12	5	2.40
6	Ger O'Connor	Roscrea	1-09	12	4	3.00
8	John Harkin	Drom-Inch	1-07	10	1	10.00
9	John Carey	Seán Treacys	1-05	8	2	4.00
9	Tommy Quigley	Moycarkey-Borris	1-05	8	5	1.60
9	John McCormack	Moycarkey-Borris	1-05	8	5	1.60

In a single game

Rank	Player	Club	Tally	Total	Opposition
1	Joe Butler	Roscrea	3-01	10	Drom-Inch
1	John Harkin	Drom-Inch	1-07	10	Roscrea
3	Jack Caesar	Moycarkey-Borris	2-02	8	Kickhams
3	John Flanagan	Moycarkey-Borris	1-05	8	Roscrea
5	John Flanagan	Moycarkey-Borris	0-07	7	Roscrea
6	Ger O'Connor	Roscrea	1-03	6	Drom-Inch
6	John Carey	Seán Treacys	1-03	6	St. Mary's
6	Peadar Queally	Roscrea	0-06	6	Seán Treacys
6	Peadar Queally	Roscrea	0-06	6	Moycarkey-Borris
6	Peadar Queally	Roscrea	0-06	6	Moycarkey-Borris
