= 1972 All-Ireland Under-21 Hurling Championship final =

1972 All-Ireland Under-21 Hurling Championship Final
- Event: 1972 All-Ireland Under-21 Hurling Championship
Galway	Dublin
2-9	1-10
- Date: 10 September 1972
- Venue: Gaelic Grounds, Limerick
- Referee: Seán O'Grady (Limerick)

The 1972 All-Ireland Under-21 Hurling Championship final was a hurling match that was played to determine the winners of the 1972 All-Ireland Under-21 Hurling Championship, the 9th season of the All-Ireland Under-21 Hurling Championship, a tournament organised by the Gaelic Athletic Association for the champion teams of the four provinces of Ireland. The final was contested by Galway of Connacht and Dublin of Leinster, with Galway winning by 2-9 to 1-10.

The All-Ireland final between Galway and Dublin was the first championship meeting between the two teams. Both sides were hoping to win their first All-Ireland title.

Galway's All-Ireland victory was their first. They became the fourth team since its inception to win the championship.

Dublin's run of bad luck in All-Ireland finals continued. This was their second All-Ireland final defeat in six seasons.

== Match ==
=== Details ===
10 September 1972

Galway	2-9 – 1-10	Dublin
G Holland 1-4, A Fenton 1-0, PJ Molloy 0-3, M Barrett 0-1, G Glynn 0-1.		B Sweeney 1-0, J Kealy 0-3, PJ Holden 0-2, P Lee 0-2, J Whelan 0-2, G O'Connell 0-1.

Gaelic Grounds, Limerick
Referee: S O'Grady (Limerick)
