= Seán Fitzpatrick =

Irish hurler

Personal information
- Native name: Seán Mac Giolla Phádraig (Irish)
- Born: 1951 (age 74–75) Carrick-on-Suir, County Tipperary, Ireland

Sport
- Sport: Hurling
- Position: Left corner-back
Club
- Years: Club
- Carrick Swans
Club titles
- Tipperary titles: 0
Inter-county
- Years: County
- 1966-1971: Tipperary
Inter-county titles
- Munster titles: 0
- All-Irelands: 0
- NHL: 0
- All Stars: 0

Seán Fitzpatrick (born 1951) is an Irish former hurler. At club level he played with Carrick Swans and was also a member of the Tipperary senior hurling team.

== Career ==
Fitzpatrick first played hurling at juvenile and underage levels with Carrick Swans. He won several divisional titles in the minor and under-21 grades, before winning a Tipperary U21AHC title in 1972. By this stage Fitzpatrick had joined the Carrick senior team and won six South Tipperary SHC medals between 1974 and 1986.

Fitzpatrick never played at minor level for Tipperary, however, his club performances earned a call-up to the under-21 team that won the Munster U21HC title in 1972. He was also a member of the intermediate team that year and lined out at left corner-back 1972 All-Ireland intermediate final defeat of Galway. Fitzpatrick was a member of the senior team's extended panel in 1977 and 1982.

== Honours ==
Carrick Swans

- South Tipperary Senior Hurling Championship: 1974, 1978, 1983, 1984, 1985, 1986
- Tipperary Under-21 A Hurling Championship: 1972
- South Tipperary Under-21 A Hurling Championship: 1971, 1972
- South Tipperary Senior Hurling Championship: 1969

Tipperary

- All-Ireland Intermediate Hurling Championship: 1972
- Munster Intermediate Hurling Championship: 1972
- Munster Under-21 Hurling Championship: 1972
