= 1986–87 All-Ireland Senior Club Hurling Championship =

All-Ireland Senior Club Hurling Championship 1986–87
Championship Details
- Dates: 31 August 1986 – 17 March 1987
- Teams: 31

All Ireland Champions
- Winners: Borris–Ileigh (1st win)
- Captain: Mick Ryan
- Manager: Paddy Doyle

All Ireland Runners-up
- Runners-up: Rathnure
- Captain: Jim O'Connell
- Manager: Dan Quigley

Provincial Champions
- Munster: Borris–Ileigh
- Leinster: Rathnure
- Ulster: McQuillans-Ballycastle
- Connacht: Killimordaly

Championship Statistics
- Matches Played: 30
- Total Goals: 119 (3.96 per game)
- Total Points: 555 (18.50 per game)
- Top Scorer: Jimmy Holohan (0–37)

The 1986–87 All-Ireland Senior Club Hurling Championship was the 17th staging of the All-Ireland Senior Club Hurling Championship, the Gaelic Athletic Association's premier inter-county club hurling tournament. The championship ran from 31 August 1986 to 17 March 1987.

Kilruane MacDonagh's of Tipperary were the defending champions, however, they failed to qualify after being beaten by Borris–Ileigh in the final of the 1986 Tipperary SHC. Clara of Kilkenny, Killimordaly of Galway and Leixlip of Kildare made their championship debuts.

The All-Ireland final was played at Croke Park in Dublin on 17 March 1987, between Borris–Ileigh of Tipperary and Rathnure of Wexford, in what was a first championship meeting between the teams. Borris–Ileigh won the match by 2–09 to 0–09 to claim their only title.

Rathnure's Jimmy Holohan was the championship's top scorer with 0–37.

== Connacht Senior Club Hurling Championship ==
=== Connacht first round ===
12 October 1986 First round	Gortletteragh	2–08 – 1–10	Tourlestrane	Páirc Gortleitreach

=== Connacht second round ===
19 October 1986 Second round	Gortletteragh	3–00 – 0–11	Tooreen	Páirc Gortleitreach
	T Reilly 1–0, T McLoughlin 1–0, M Keane 1–0.		J Henry 0–8, P Malone 0–2, G Greally 0–1.	Referee: T Healy (Roscommon)

=== Connacht semi-final ===
2 November 1986 Semi-final	Four Roads	1–08 – 2–10	Tooreen	St Aidan's Grounds
	J Curley 1–1, Paddy Dolan 0–2, Paul Dolan 0–2, T Fallon 0–1, H Connolly 0–1, F Carty 0–1.		J Henry 2–7, P Malone 0–1, T Henry 0–1, J Cunnane 0–1.

=== Connacht final ===
16 November 1986 Final	Tooreen	1–04 – 6–16	Killimordaly	Aghamore Grounds
	M Haverty 1–5, J Ryan 1–2, L Craven 1–1, P Ryan 1–1, N Earls 1–1, N Cooney 1–0, E Ryan 0–3, T Keady 0–1, T Monaghan 0–1, N Cannon 0–1.		A Henry 1–0, M Trench 0–1, T Henry 0–1, J Cunnane 0–1, J Henry 0–1.

== Leinster Senior Club Hurling Championship ==
=== Leinster preliminary round ===
4 October 1986 Preliminary round	Naomh Moninne	3–12 – 1–06	Slasher Gaels	Páirc an Chuinnigh
	J Murphy 2–0, J Kennedy 0–5, C O'Gorman 1–1, A Kerrigan 0–3, B Brady 0–2, P Callan 0–1.		S Stakelum 1-2, K Byrne 0-2, K Dalton 0-1, J Finucane 0-1.

=== Leinster first round ===
19 October 1986 First round	Leixlip	1–11 – 1–08	Glenealy	St Conleth's Park
	M McGrath 0–4, B Fox 1–0, M Burns 0–3, S Brennan 0–3, D Heffernan 0–1.		M O'Neill 0–7, D Gorman 1–0, T Glynn 0–1.

19 October 1986 First round	Naomh Eoin	6–19 – 3–06	Naomh Moninne	Dr Cullen Park
	E Quirke 4–9, M Slye 2–3, T Quirke 0–3, P Quirke 0–2, A Curry 0–1, D Murphy 0–1.		J Kennedy 2–3, C O'Gorman 1–0, O Reilly 0–1, J Murphy 0–1, B Brady 0–1.

19 October 1986 First round	Navan O'Mahony's	1–04 – 3–10	Castletown Geogehan	St Loman's Park
	F Duffy 1–1, B Tansey 0–1, D Mitchell 0–1, G Kelly 0–1.		P Kiernan 0–7, J Clarke 2–0, N Kirby 1–0, G Whelan 0–1, F McClavin 0–1, M Lowry 0–1.

=== Leinster quarter-finals ===
1 November 1986 Quarter-final	Naomh Eoin	2–06 – 3–10	Rathnure	Dr Cullen Park
	M Slye 1–3, E Quirke 1–1, J O'Hara 0–1, P Quirke 0–1.		M Morrissey 2–0, J Holohan 0–6, J Quigley 1–1, J Murphy 0–2, N Hearns 0–1.

2 November 1986 Quarter-final	Leixlip	1–05 – 3–18	Coolderry	Naas Grounds
	M Burns 0–2, P McCarthy 0–1, S Brennan 0–1, J Roche 0–1.		V Teehan 2–3, P McLoughney 1–6, P Connors 0–4, PJ Burke 0–2, M King 0–1, J Kennedy 0–1, C O'Connell 0–1.

2 November 1986 Quarter-final	Camross	3–08 – 0–14	Faughs	O'Moore Park
	F Keenan 1–5, PJ Cuddy 2–0, M Cuddy 0–1, F Palmer 0–1, M Collie 0–1.		K O'Brien 0–5, MJ Ryan 0–4, M Newman 0–1, J Smith 0–1, J Cunningham 0–1, F Spellman 0–1, S Garry 0–1.

8 November 1986 Quarter-final	Castletown Geoghegan	1–05 – 2–08	Clara	Castletown Geoghegan Grounds
	M Bolger 1–1, E Clarke 0–2, J Clarke 0–1, G Whelan 0–1.		H Ryan 1–3, A Prendergast 0–4, S Whearty 1–0, B Barcoe 0–1.

=== Leinster semi-finals ===
16 November 1986 Semi-final	Rathnure	2–11 – 1–05	Coolderry	Geraldine Park
	J Holohan 0–7, P Codd 1–1, L Ronan 1–0, J Conran 0–1, M Morrissey 0–1, J Murphy 0–1.		J Kennedy 1–0, V Teehan 0–3, M Keane 0–1, P McLoughney 0–1.

16 November 1986 Semi-final	Camross	1–07 – 2–03	Clara	Geraldine Park
	F Keenan 0–6, M Cuddy 1–0, T Delaney 0–1.		H Ryan 1–1, S Whearty 1–1, L Ryan 0–1.

=== Leinster final ===
30 November 1986 Final	Rathnure	2–16 – 3–09	Camross	Croke Park
	J Holohan 0–12, M Morrissey 2–0, N Hearne 0–2, J Codd 0–1, J Murphy 0–1.		F Keenan 1–3, PJ Cuddy 1–2, V Palmer 1–0, M Cuddy 0–1, R Moloney 0–1, M Collier 0–1, T Delaney 0–1.	Referee: N O'Donoghue (Dublin)

== Munster Senior Club Hurling Championship ==
=== Munster quarter-finals ===
19 October 1986 Quarter-final	Midleton	2–10 – 2–10	Claughaun	Clonmult Memorial Park
	G Fitzgerald 1–5, K Hennessy 1–1, S O'Brien 0–2, G Glavin 0–1, C O'Neill 0–1.		L O'Connor 2–5, M Ryan 0–3, D Fitzgerald 0–2.	Referee: G Ryan (Tipperary)

19 October 1986 Quarter-final	Clarecastle	6–12 – 2–02	Mount Sion	Cusack Park
	D Fitzgerald 3–0, G O'Loughlin 1–3, V O'Loughlin 1–2, T Howard 1–1, G Power 0–2, J Callinan 0–2, P Russell 0–1, D Kelly 0–1.		P Ryan 1–0, P McGrath 1–0, D Loughnane 0–1, S Ahearne 0–1.	Referee: N Duggan (Limerick)

2 November 1986 Quarter-final replay	Claughaun	1–10 – 1–07	Midleton	Gaelic Grounds
	L O'Connor 0–5, G Ryan 1–0, D Fitzgerald 0–3, J Rea 0–2.		K Hennessy 0–5, S O'Brien 1–0, K Coakley 0–2.	Referee: G Ryan (Tipperary)

=== Munster semi-finals ===
2 November 1986 Semi-final	Clarecastle	3–11 – 2–04	St Brendan's, Ardfert	Cusack Park
	D Fitzgerald 2–1, V O'Loughlin 1–2, P Russell 0–3, T Howard 0–2, J Callinan 0–1, K Morrissey 0–1, G O'Loughlin 0–1.		L Hussey 2–1, M Fitzgerald 0–1, G Hussey 0–1, P Stack 0–1.	Referee: T Murray (Limerick)

17 November 1986 Semi-final	Claughaun	1–09 – 2–10	Borris-Ileigh	Gaelic Grounds
	L O'Connor 0–6, D Fitzgerald 1–0, M Rea 0–1, J Rea 0–1, G Ryan 0–1.		P Kenny 1–2, N O'Dwyer 0–5, M Coen 1–0, J McGrath 0–1, C Stakelum 0–1, B Kenny 0–1.	Referee: W Horgan (Cork)

=== Munster final ===
30 November 1986 Final	Borris-Ileigh	1–13 – 1–09	Clarecastle	Gaelic Grounds
	N O'Dwyer 0–9, B Kenny 1–0, P Kenny 0–2, C Stakelum 0–1, J McGrath 0–1.		G Fitzgerald 1–1, P Russell 0–3, V O'Loughlin 0–1, C Martin 0–1, T Howard 0–1, J Callinan 0–1, G O'Loughlin 0–1.	Referee: W Horgan (Cork)

== Ulster Senior Hurling Championship ==
=== Ulster first round ===
31 August 1986 Quarter-final	Middletown Na Fianna	w/o – scr.	Setanta	St Mary's Park

=== Ulster quarter-finals ===
14 September 1986 Quarter-final	Clontibret O'Neills	1–07 – 2–10	Middletown Na Fianna	Páirc Uí Néill
	W Connelly 1-5, D Finnegan 0-1, K Vennan 0-1.		M Lennon 0-6, B McDonald 1-1, D McArdle 1-0, D McBride 0-2, T Lennon 0-1.

14 September 1986 Quarter-final	Lisbellaw St Patrick's	1–04 – 7–19	Lavey	St Mary's Grounds
	O McShea 1-1, M Breslin 0-2, D McShea 0-1.		S Downey 4-3, H Downey 1-9, D Gillan 1-1, K McGurk 1-0, P McGurk 0-2, M McAleese 0-2, F Diamond 0-1, C Henry 0-1.

=== lster semi-finals ===
28 September 1986 Semi-final	Middletown Na Fianna	1–06 – 6–11	Ballycastle McQuillans	Derrynoose Grounds
	B McDonald 1-0, M Lennon 0-3, T Lennon 0-1, D McBride 0-1, S McConnell 0-1.		B Donnelly 3-2, D Donnelly 2-3, M Kelly 1-0, P Boyle 0-2, P McKillen 0-2, E Donnelly 0-2.

28 September 1986 Semi-final	Lavey	0–15 – 1–05	Ballycran	Lavey Grounds
	H Downey 0-10, S Downey 0-2, M McAleese 0-1, G Dillon 0-1, J McGurk 0-1.		D O'Prey 1-1, B Hughes 0-1, M Egan 0-1, M Blaney 0-1, D Hughes 0-1.

=== Ulster final ===
19 October 1986 Final	Lavey	1–08 – 1–13	Ballycastle McQuillans	Guladuff
	H Downey 0–6, John McGurk 1–1, S Downey 0–1.		D Donnelly 0–8, E Donnelly 1–0, P Boyle 0–3, B Donnelly 0–2.

== All-Ireland Senior Hurling Championship ==
=== All-Ireland quarter-final ===
1 February 1987 Quarter-final	Ballycastle McQuillans	4–14 – 1–06	St Gabriel's	Pearse Park
	D Donnelly 2–5, O Laverty 2–0, P Boyle 0–4, B Donnelly 0–2, P McKillen 0–2, E Donnelly 0–1.		G Kennedy 0–4, M Nevin 1–0, T Conneely 0–1, P Hoctory 0–1.	Referee: N o'Donoghue (Dublin)

=== All-Ireland semi-finals ===
8 February 1987 Semi-final	Rathnure	0–11 – 0–09	Killimordaly	Wexford Park
	J Holohan 0–9, J Codd 0–1, J Murphy 0–1.		T Keady 0–3, L Creaven 0–3, N Cooney 0–1, P Ryan 0–1, J Ryan 0–1.	Referee: G Ryan (Tipperary)

8 February 1987 Semi-final	Borris-Ileigh	3–16 – 3–08	Ballycastle McQuillans	Semple Stadium
	N O'Dywer 0–10, C Stakelum 1–2, B Kenny 1–0, P Kenny 1–0, F Collins 0–2, T Ryan 0–1, M Coen 0–1.		D Donnelly 2–2, P Boyle 1–0, P McKillen 0–3, B Donnelly 0–1, E Donnelly 0–1, O Laverty 0–1.	Referee: P Long (Kilkenny)

=== All-Ireland final ===
17 March 1987 Final	Borris-Ileigh	2–09 – 0–09	Rathnure	Croke Park
	A Ryan 1–2, P Kenny 1–1, N O'Dwyer 0–4, C Stakelum 0–1, J McGrath 0–1.		J Holohan 0–3, J Murphy 0–3, N Hearne 0–1, M Morrissey 0–1, J Redmond 0–1.	Attendance: 9,455; Referee: G Kirwan (Offaly)

== Championship statistics ==
=== Top scorers ===
Rank	Player	Club	Tally	Total	Matches	Average
1	Jimmy Holohan	Rathnure	0–37	37	5	7.40
2	Desmond Donnelly	Ballycastle McQuillans	6–18	36	4	9.00
3	Henry Downey	Ballycastle McQuillans	1–25	28	3	9.33
3	Noel O'Dwyer	Borris–Ileigh	0–28	28	4	7.00
5	Eamon Quirke	Naomh Eoin	5–10	25	2	12.50
6	Joe Henry	Tooreen	2–16	22	3	7.33
6	Leo O'Connor	Claughaun	2–16	22	3	7.33
8	Dermot Fitzgerald	Clarecastle	6–02	20	3	6.66
8	Frank Keenan	Camross	2–14	20	3	6.66
10	Seámus Downey	Lavey	4–06	18	3	6.00
