= 1972 All-Ireland Intermediate Hurling Championship =

Championship Details
- Dates: 16 April – 17 September 1972
- Teams: 17

All Ireland Champions
- Winners: Tipperary (4th win)
- Captain: Noel Seymour

All Ireland Runners-up
- Runners-up: Galway

Provincial Champions
- Munster: Tipperary
- Leinster: Dublin
- Ulster: Down
- Connacht: Not Played

The 1972 All-Ireland Intermediate Hurling Championship was the 12th staging of the All-Ireland Intermediate Hurling Championship since its establishment by the Gaelic Athletic Association in 1961. THe championship ran from 16 April to 17 September 1972.

Tipperary entered the championship as the defending champions.

The All-Ireland final was played at St. Brendan's Park in Birr on 17 September 1972 between Tipperary and Galway, in what was their first ever meeting in the final. Tipperary won the match by 2-13 to 1-09 to claim their fourth All-Ireland title overall and a second title in succession.

== Leinster Intermediate Hurling Championship ==
=== Leinster quarter-finals ===
16 April 1972 Quarter-final	Wexford	4-15 - 3-04	Wicklow	Páirc Uí Shíocháin
	D Shannon 1-5, M Nolan 2-1, D Fortune 1-0, J Galwey 0-3, J Kehoe 0-2, J Quirke 0-1, D O'Brien 0-1, M Morrissey 0-1, H Goff 0-1.		M O'Neill 2-1, M Murray 1-1, P O'Reilly 0-1, M Kennedy 0-1.

16 April 1972 Quarter-final	Laois	3-07 - 1-08	Carlow	O'Moore Park
	E Jones 1-2, M Dalton 1-0, M Wall 1-0, P Kavanagh 0-2, T Cashin 0-1, J Galvin 0-1, A Purcell 0-1.		D Dunne 1-0, P McNally 0-3, W Walsh 0-2, J Sheeran 0-1, J Keogh 0-1, T Coburn 0-1.

16 April 1972 Quarter-final	Dublin	5-11 - 4-06	Kilkenny	O'Moore Park
	V Holden 1-6, W Walsh 2-1, N Kinsella 1-1, G Hermon 1-0, PJ Holden 0-1, F Spellman 0-1, J Kealy 0-1.		S Muldowney 2-1, A Aylward 1-2, J Nolan 1-0, J O'Connor 0-1, S Butler 0-1, S Callanan 0-1.

=== Leinster semi-finals ===
30 April 1972 Semi-final	Dublin	3-09 - 3-06	Meath	Croke Park
	N Kinsella 1-2, V Holden 0-5, T Purcell 1-0, E Hudson 1-0, M Kelly 0-1, P Spellman 0-1.		R Melia 2-1, M McCabe 1-0, B Crawford 0-3, S Kearney 0-2.

21 May 1972 Semi-final	Wexford	4-14 - 3-04	Laois	Dr. Cullen Park
	D O'Brien 2-3, D Fortune 1-3, M Furlong 1-2, J Galwey 0-3, T O'Loughlin 0-1, O Cullen 0-1, M Nolan 0-1.		S Bergin 2-1, T Cashin 1-1, P O'Brien 0-1, G Galvin 0-1.

=== Leinster final ===
9 July 1972 Final	Dublin	3-13 - 3-04	Wexford	Croke Park
	P Quigley 0-6, N Kinsella 1-2, G Hernon 1-0, M Hamill 1-0, M Walsh 0-2, PJ Holden 0-1, M Holden 0-1, F Hamill 0-1.		P Kehoe 2-0, J Kehoe 1-1, J Galwey 0-2, D O'Brien 0-1.

== Munster Intermediate Hurling Championship ==
=== Munster quarter-finals ===
19 April 1972 Quarter-final	Limerick	2-10 - 3-10	Kerry	Newcastle West Grounds
	P McCarthy 1-2, J Neenan 0-4, B Murnane 1-0, T Horgan 0-1, D Kennedy 0-1, T McInerney 0-1, T Brennan 0-1.		D Lovete 1-4, T Nolan 1-2, P Moriarty 1-1, B Twooeny 0-2, J Sullivan 0-1.

19 April 1972 Quarter-final	Tipperary	3-10 - 2-06	Clare	MacDonagh Park
	J Darcy 2-0, T Moloney 0-6, J Keogh 1-0, S Mackey 0-2, O Killeen 0-1, J Keane 0-1.		D Teefey 1-0, M Keane 1-0, N McInerney 0-3, L Danagher 0-2, S Stack 0-1.

20 April 1972 Quarter-final	Waterford	3-04 - 7-12	Cork	Cappoquin Sportsfield
	L Canning 2-0, PJ Ryan 1-1, J Foley 0-2, J Wall 0-1.		R Crowley 2-3, D Allen 2-0, S Farrell 2-0, M Sheehan 1-2, K McSweeney 0-4, F Cogan 0-2, J Barrett 0-1.

=== Munster semi-final ===
24 May 1972 Semi-final	Tipperary	6-07 - 0-09	Cork	Seán Treacy Park
	J Seymour 2-2, S Mackey 1-1, J Keogh 1-1, N Flannery 1-1, J Darcy 1-0, J Kennedy 0-2.		T Ryan 0-5, B Wiley 0-1, R Crowley 0-1, J Barrett 0-1, D Allen 0-1.

- Kerry received a bye in this round.

=== Munster final ===
28 June 1972 Final	Tipperary	4-16 - 3-12	Kerry	St. Ailbe's Park
	M Ryan 2-4, S Mackey 0-5, J Darcy 1-1, J Kennedy 1-0, J Keogh 0-2, M Flannery 0-2, P Coffey 0-1, J Spooner 0-1.		T Moylan 1-5, B Lovett 1-1, P Lyons 1-0, B Healy 0-2, T Moriarty 0-2, F Thornton 0-2.

== Ulster Intermediate Hurling Championship ==
=== Ulster final ===
9 July 1972 Final	Down	3-13 - 5-07	Antrim	St. Patrick's Park
	P Braniff 1-9.

16 July 1972 Final replay	Antrim	1-10 - 2-09	Down	Casement Park
				Referee: E Donnelly

== All-Ireland Intermediate Hurling Championship ==
=== All-Ireland quarter-final ===
30 July 1972 Quarter-final	Galway	8-10 - 3-09	Down	Dunlo Grounds
	K Hanniffy 3-2, T O'Hara 2-1, P Ryan 2-1, D Furey 1-3, G Coone 0-2, P Fahy 0-1.		P Braniff 1-6, F Faloona 1-0, G Byers 1-0, R Gilmore 0-2, S Sands 0-1.

=== All-Ireland semi-finals ===
27 August 1972 Semi-final	Tipperary	2-09 - 2-04	Dublin	Nowlan Park
	S Mackey 1-4, O Killeen 1-0, M Ryan 0-3, J Kehoe 0-1, W Ferncombe 0-1.		P Maycock 1-1, W Walsh 1-0, P Quigley 0-1, M Kelly 0-1, J Kealy 0-1.

27 August 1972 Semi-final	London	0-13 - 3-12	Galway	New Eltham
	M Walshe 0-6, P O'Neill 0-4, B Barry 0-2, T Frehill 0-1.		K Hanniffy 1-4, E Muldoon 1-2, G Coone 0-4, G Glynn 0-1, P Egan 0-1, T O'Hara 0-1.

=== All-Ireland final ===
17 September 1972 Final	Tipperary	2-13 - 1-09	Galway	St. Brendan's Park
	J Kennedy 1-2, S Mackey 0-5, O Killeen 1-1, M Ryan 0-3, T Moloney 0-1, J Connors 0-1.		P Egan 1-4, G Coone 0-2, M Barrett 0-1, E Muldoon 0-1, K Hanniffy 0-1.	Referee: N Dalton (Waterford)
