= 1983 Tipperary Senior Hurling Championship =

Annual hurling competition season

- Dates: 22 August - 30 October 1983
- Teams: 8
- Champions: Borris-Ileigh (5th title); Francis Spillane (captain)
- Runners-up: Loughmore-Castleiney; Richard Stapleton (captain)

Tournament statistics
- Matches played: 7
- Goals scored: 22 (3.14 per match)
- Points scored: 163 (23.29 per match)
- Top scorer(s): Pat McGrath (0-24)

The 1983 Tipperary Senior Hurling Championship was the 92nd staging of the Tipperary Senior Hurling Championship since its establishment by the Tipperary County Board in 1887.

Moycarkey-Borris were the defending champions.

On 30 October 1983, Borris-Ileigh won the championship after a 0–17 to 1–11 defeat of Loughmore-Castleiney in the final at Leahy Park. It was their fifth championship title overall and their first title since 1981.

== Results ==
=== Quarter-finals ===
21 August 1983 Quarter-final	Carrick Swans	2-12 - 2-10	Lorrha	St. Michael's Park
	S Fitzpatrick 0-5, P Kirby 1-1, M Walsh 1-0, T Fitzpatrick 0-3, T Russell 0-1, B White 0-1, T Waters 0-1.		K Hogg 1-3, J Shelly 0-4, J Sullivan 1-0, J Kennedy 0-2, W Fogarty 0-1.

28 August 1983 Quarter-final	Borris-Ileigh	1-14 - 0-06	Éire Óg	St. Michael's Park
	P Kenny 0-7, T Stapleton 1-1, B Ryan 0-3, R Stakelum 0-1, N O'Dwyer 0-1, M Coen 0-1.		L O'Connell 0-2, D McGettigan 0-1, O Maher 0-1, M Shanahan 0-1, D Ahearne 0-1.

28 August 1983 Quarter-final	Loughmore-Castleiney	1-18 - 5-05	Cashel King Cormacs	Boherlahan-Dualla
	P McGrath 0-8, T McGrath 1-3, L Cormack 0-3, J Cormack 0-1, J Maher 0-1, J Treacy 0-1, M McGrath 0-1.		J Grogan 2-0, J Minogue 1-1, T Grogan 1-1, JJ Murphy 1-0, S Slattery 0-1, C Bonnar 0-1, Peter Fitzelle 0-1.

28 August 1983 Quarter-final	Moycarkey-Borris	4-09 - 1-11	Cappawhite	Boherlahan-Dualla
	N Slattery 2-1, D Fogarty 2-0, D Quigley 0-3, J Cormack 0-2, T Quigley 0-2, J Caesar 0-1.		G O'Neill 1-2, T O'Neill 0-4, A Buckley 0-3, E Ryan 0-1, G Ryan 0-1.

=== Semi-finals ===
25 September 1983 Semi-final	Borris-Ileigh	1-13 - 1-12	Moycarkey-Borris	Leahy Park
	A Ryan 1-0, N O'Dwyer 0-3, M Coen 0-3, P Kenny 0-3, B Ryan 0-2, G Stapleton 0-1, N Maher 0-1.		D Fogarty 1-3, D Quigley 0-5, J Bergin 0-2, J Caesar 0-1, John Flanagan 0-1.

25 September 1983 Semi-final	Loughmore-Castleiney	2-16 - 1-09	Carrick Swans	Leahy Park
	J Cormack 2-2, P McGrath 0-8, L Cormack 0-2, T McGrath 0-1, M McGrath 0-1, J Treacy 0-1, E Brennan 0-1.		M Grace 1-0, S Fitzpatrick 0-3, T Fitzpatrick 0-2, T Russell 0-1, P Walsh 0-1, P Kirby 0-1, M Faulkner 0-1.

=== Final ===
30 October 1983 Final	Borris-Ileigh	0-17 - 1-11	Loughmore-Castleiney	Leahy Park
	P Kenny 0-6, M Coen 0-3, N O'Dwyer 0-3, G Stapleton 0-2, J McGrath 0-1, T Stapleton 0-1, B Kenny 0-1.		P McGrath 0-8, J Treacy 1-0, T McGrath 0-3.	Referee: J Moloney

== Championship statistics ==
=== Top scorers ===
Overall

Rank	Player	Club	Tally	Total	Matches	Average
1	Pat McGrath	Loughmore-Castleiney	0-24	24	3	8.00
2	Philip Kenny	Borris-Ileigh	0-16	16	3	5.33
3	David Fogarty	Moycarkey-Borris	3-03	12	2	6.00
4	Tom McGrath	Loughmore-Castleiney	1-07	10	3	3.33
5	John Cormack	Loughmore-Castleiney	2-03	9	3	3.00
6	Seán Fitzpatrick	Carrick Swans	0-08	8	2	4.00
6	Dick Quigley	Moycarkey-Borris	0-08	8	2	4.00
8	Ned Slattery	Moycarkey-Borris	2-01	7	2	3.50
8	Mick Coen	Borris-Ileigh	0-07	7	3	2.33
8	Noel O'Dwyer	Borris-Ileigh	0-07	7	3	2.33

In a single game

Rank	Player	Club	Tally	Total	Opposition
1	John Cormack	Loughmore-Castleiney	2-02	8	Carrick Swans
1	Pat McGrath	Loughmore-Castleiney	0-08	8	Cashel King Cormacs
1	Pat McGrath	Loughmore-Castleiney	0-08	8	Carrick Swans
1	Pat McGrath	Loughmore-Castleiney	0-08	8	Borris-Ileigh
5	Ned Slattery	Moycarkey-Borris	2-01	7	Cappawhite
5	Philip Kenny	Borris-Ileigh	0-07	7	Éire Óg
7	John Grogan	Cashel King Cormacs	2-00	6	Loughmore-Castleiney
7	David Fogarty	Moycarkey-Borris	2-00	6	Cappawhite
7	Kieran Hogg	Lorrha	1-03	6	Carrick Swans
7	Tom McGrath	Loughmore-Castleiney	1-03	6	Cashel King Cormacs
7	David Fogarty	Moycarkey-Borris	1-03	6	Borris-Ileigh
7	Philip Kenny	Borris-Ileigh	0-06	6	Loughmore-Castleiney
