= Peadar Quealy =

Irish hurler

Personal information
- Native name: Peadar Ó Caollaí (Irish)
- Born: 1956 Roscrea, County Tipperary, Ireland
- Occupation: Primary school principal

Sport
- Sport: Hurling
- Position: Centre-forward
Clubs
- Years: Club
- Roscrea; Inane Rovers
Club titles
- Tipperary titles: 1
College
- Years: College
- University College Cork
College titles
- Fitzgibbon titles: 1
Inter-county
Years	County	Apps (scores)
1977-1981	Tipperary	5 (1-05)
Inter-county titles
- Munster titles: 0
- All-Irelands: 0
- NHL: 1
- All Stars: 0

Peadar N. Quealy (born 1956) is an Irish former hurler. At club level he played with Roscrea and was also a member of the Tipperary senior hurling team.

== Career ==
Quealy first played hurling at juvenile and underage levels with Roscrea and won a divisional minor title in 1974. He also lined out as a Gaelic footballer with Inane Rovers and won a Tipperary U21AFC title in 1977. As a student at University College Dublin Quealy was called-up to the college hurling team and won a Fitzgibbon Cup medal in 1979. By this stage he had already joined the Roscrea senior team and won a Tipperary SHC title in 1980. Quealy also won two North Tipperary SHC titles, including one as team captain.

Quealy first played for Tipperary during a two-year tenure as a dual player at minor level in 1973 and 1974. He continued his dual status to under-21 level, however, his underage career ended without any silverware. Queally was drafted onto the Tipperary senior hurling team in 1977 and won a National League medal in 1979. He served as team captain in 1981.

== Honours ==
University College Dublin

- Fitzgibbon Cup: 1979

Inane Rovers

- Tipperary Under-21 A Football Championship: 1977

Roscrea

- Tipperary Senior Hurling Championship: 1980
- North Tipperary Senior Hurling Championship: 1980, 1982 (c)
- North Tipperary Minor A Hurling Championship: 1974

Tipperary

- National Hurling League: 1978-79

Sporting positions
Preceded by	Tipperary senior hurling team captain 1981	Succeeded by Timmy Stapleton
