= John Flanagan (Tipperary hurler) =

Tipperary hurler (1947–1994)

Personal information
- Native name: Seán Ó Flannagáin (Irish)
- Born: 1947 Galbertstown, County Tipperary, Ireland
- Died: 9 September 1994 (aged 47) Galbertstown, County Tipperary, Ireland
- Occupation: Factory worker
- Height: 5 ft 9 in (175 cm)

Sport
- Sport: Hurling
- Position: Right corner-forward
Club
- Years: Club
- 1964-1990: Moycarkey–Borris
Club titles
- Tipperary titles: 2
- Munster titles: 1
Inter-county
Years	County	Apps (scores)
1967-1977	Tipperary	22 (8-35)
Inter-county titles
- Munster titles: 2
- All-Irelands: 1
- NHL: 1
- All Stars: 0

John Flanagan (1947 – 9 September 1994) was an Irish hurler. At club level, he played with Moycarkey–Borris and at inter-county level with the Tipperary senior hurling team.

== Career ==
Flanagan played hurling at all levels as a student at Thurles CBS. He began his club career with Moycarkey–Borris at juvenile and underage levels, before progressing to adult level in 1964. Flanagan won the first of five Mid Tipperary SHC medals the following year. He won a Tipperary SHC medal after Moycarkey's 2-12 to 0-11 win over Roscrea in a final replay in 1982. Flanagan subsequently claimed a Munster Club SHC medal that year, before winning a second Tipperary SHC medal in 1984.

At inter-county level, Flanagan first played for Tipperary during a two-year tenure with the minor team. He later spent three consecutive years with the under-21 team and won an All-Ireland U21HC medal after a 1-08 to 1-07 win over Dublin in the 1967 All-Ireland under-21 final.

Flanagan made his senior team debut in 1967. He won his first Munster SHC medal that year before adding a National Hurling League medal to his collection in 1968. Flanagan returned to the team after a period of suspension and won a second Munster SHC medal. He lined out at corner-forward when Tipperary beat Kilkenny by 5-17 to 5-14 in the 1971 All-Ireland final.

Performances at inter-county level for Tipperary resulted in Flanagan being called up to the Munster inter-provincial team. He won his sole Railway Cup medal in 1969 after Munster's 3-13 to 4-04 win over Connacht in the final.

== Death ==
Flanagan died suddenly on 9 September 1994, aged 47.

== Honours ==
Moycarkey-Borris

- Munster Senior Club Hurling Championship: 1982
- Tipperary Senior Hurling Championship: 1982, 1984
- Mid Tipperary Senior Hurling Championship: 1965, 1967, 1971, 1981, 1982

Tipperary

- All-Ireland Senior Hurling Championship: 1971
- Munster Senior Hurling Championship: 1967, 1971
- National Hurling League: 1967–68
- All-Ireland Under-21 Hurling Championship: 1967
- Munster Under-21 Hurling Championship: 1967

Munster

- Railway Cup: 1969
