= 1986 All-Ireland Senior Club Hurling Championship final =

1986 All-Ireland Senior Club Hurling Championship Final
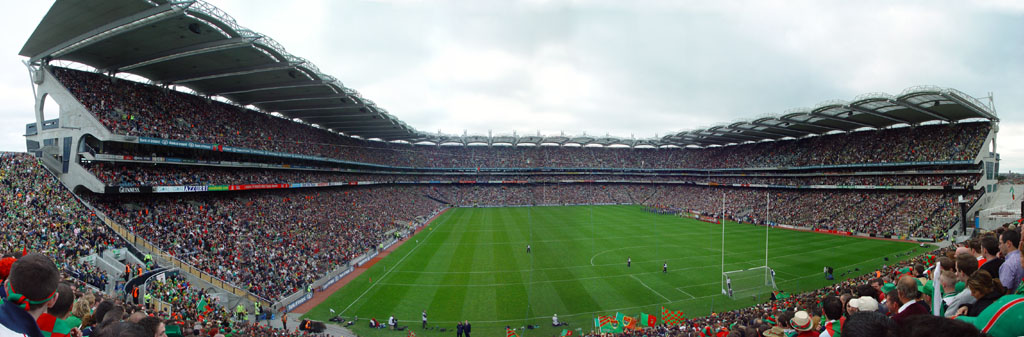
- View from the Hill in Croke Park
- Event: 1985–86 All-Ireland Senior Club Hurling Championship
Kilruane MacDonagh's	Buffers Alley
1-15	2-10
- Date: 16 March 1986
- Venue: Croke Park, Dublin
- Referee: Terence Murray (Limerick)
- Attendance: 10,176

The 1986 All-Ireland Senior Club Hurling Championship final was a hurling match played at Croke Park on 16 March 1986 to determine the winners of the 1985–86 All-Ireland Senior Club Hurling Championship, the 16th season of the All-Ireland Senior Club Hurling Championship, a tournament organised by the Gaelic Athletic Association for the champion clubs of the four provinces of Ireland. The final was contested by Kilruane MacDonagh's of Tipperary and Buffers Alley of Wexford, with Kilruane MacDonagh's winning by 1-15 to 2-10.

The All-Ireland final was a unique occasion as it was the first ever championship meeting between Kilruane MacDonagh's and Buffer's Alley. It remains their only championship meeting at this level. Both sides were hoping to make history by winning their first All-Ireland title.

In one of the great All-Ireland club finals, Buffers Alley started in whirlwind fashion and led by 2-2 to 0-2 early in the first half. Kilruane clawed their way back into the game and trailed at the interval by four points on a score line of 2-4 to 0-6.

Kilruane MacDonagh's felt that the ship had been steadied and emerged for the second half in determined mood. Five minutes into the second half Pat Quinlan availed of an error by Colm Doran to whip the ball to the net and bring the sides level. The tide seemed to have turned in Kilruane's favour but Buffers Alley refused to buckle. Six times in the thrilling second half the sides were level until a 65 from Gilbert Williams separated the sides with two minutes left. His brother Jim, who had already scored four magnificent points from play, added another on the call of time to secure a two-point victory.

Victory for Kilruane MacDonagh's secured their first All-Ireland title. They became the 10th club to win the All-Ireland title, while they were the second Tipperary representatives to claim the ultimate prize.

== Match ==
=== Details ===
16 March 1986

Kilruane MacDonagh's	1-15 - 2-10	Buffers Alley
Pat Quinlan 1-2, J Williams 0-5, Gilbert Williams 0-3 (2 '70s' and 1f), P Williams 0-2 (1f), Philip Quinlan 0-2, Gerry Williams 0-1.		M Butler 1-6 (5f), T Doran 1-0, S O'Leary 0-2, T Dempsey 0-1, G Sweeney 0-1.

Croke Park, Dublin
Attendance: 10,176
Referee: T Murray (Limerick)

Midelton	Buffers Alley
