= Austin Buckley =

Irish hurler

Personal information
- Native name: Áistín Ó Buachalla (Irish)
- Born: 27 September 1960 (age 66) Cappawhite, County Tipperary, Ireland
- Height: 5 ft 11 in (180 cm)

Sport
- Sport: Hurling
- Position: Left wing-forward
Club
- Years: Club
- Cappawhite
Club titles
- Tipperary titles: 1
Inter-county
- Years: County
- 1982-1990: Tipperary
Inter-county titles
- Munster titles: 0
- All-Irelands: 0
- NHL: 0
- All Stars: 0

Austin Buckley (born 27 September 1960) is an Irish hurler who played as a left wing-forward for the Tipperary senior team.

Buckley joined the team during the 1982 championship and was a member of the team until his inter-county retirement almost a decade later. An All-Ireland medalist in the under-21 grade, he won two Munster winners' medals as a non-playing substitute in the senior grade.

At club level Buckley is a one-time county club championship medalist with Cappawhite.
