= 1972 All-Ireland Under-21 Hurling Championship =

All-Ireland Under-21 Hurling Championship 1972
All Ireland Champions
- Winners: Galway (1st win)

All Ireland Runners-up
- Runners-up: Dublin

Provincial Champions
- Munster: Tipperary
- Leinster: Dublin
- Ulster: Antrim
- Connacht: Galway

The 1972 All-Ireland Under-21 Hurling Championship was the 9th staging of the All-Ireland Under-21 Hurling Championship since its establishment by the Gaelic Athletic Association in 1964.

Cork were the defending champions, however, they were defeated by Clare in the Munster quarter-final.

On 10 September 1972, Galway won the championship following a 2-9 to 1-10 defeat of Dublin in the All-Ireland final. This was their first All-Ireland title in the under-21 grade.

== Results ==
=== Leinster Under-21 Hurling Championship ===
Final

16 July 1972 Final	Dublin	2-11 - 0-15	Offaly	O'Moore Park, Portlaoise
	V Holden 0-5, M Holden 1-1, C Henneberry 1-0, J Kiely 0-2, PJ Holden 0-1, V Donovan 0-1, M Leonard 0-1.		K Mooney 0-7, J Egan 0-2, J McKenna 0-2, G Woods 0-1, P Quinn 0-1, A Daly 0-1, P Bennett 0-1.	Referee: J Rankins (Laois)

=== Munster Under-21 Hurling Championship ===
First round

3 May 1972 First round	Limerick	9-15 - 1-05	Kerry	Dromcollogher

3 May 1972 First round	Tipperary	6-05 - 0-05	Waterford	Leahy Park, Cashel
	S Dunne 2-2, J Darcy 2-0, J Cunningham 1-2, G Howard 1-0, T Fitzpatrick 0-1.		J Galvin 0-2, T Casey 0-1, J Heffernan 0-1, J O'Connor 0-1.	Referee: D Twomey (Cork)

Semi-finals

3 May 1972 First round	Clare	3-09 - 3-08	Cork	Gaelic Grounds, Limerick
	T Ryan 1-4, M O'Connor 1-0, P Hickey 1-0, N Ryan 0-2, J Callinan 0-1, E O'Connor 0-1, J Durack 0-1.		J Rothwell 3-0, S O'Leary 0-5, J Barry-Murphy 0-1, T Fogarty 0-1, P Kavanagh 0-1.	Referee: J O'Grady (Limerick)

25 June 1972 Semi-final	Limerick	3-03 - 0-16	Tipperary	Gaelic Grounds, Limerick
	L Enright 1-0, L O'Donoghue 1-0, L Lawlor 1-0, J Neenan 0-3.		J Cunningham 0-8, N Flannery 0-2, S Power 0-2, G Howard 0-1, J Darcy 0-1, T Fitzpatrick 0-1, J Keogh 0-1.

Final

16 July 1972 Final	Clare	3-10 - 4-10	Tipperary	Cusack Park, Ennis
	S Durack 1-3, S Stack 1-1, M O'Connor 1-0, T Ryan 0-2, J Callinan 0-2, N Ryan 0-1, P Hickey 0-1.		J Cunningham 2-4, S Power 1-1, M Kennedy 1-0, T Butler 0-2, M Flannery 0-2, T Kehoe 0-1.	Referee: F Murphy (Cork)

=== All-Ireland Under-21 Hurling Championship ===
Semi-finals

15 August 1972 Semi-final	Tipperary	1-11 - 2-11	Galway	MacDonagh Park, Nenagh
	J Keogh 1-3, J Cunningham 0-4, S Power 0-3, T Fitzpatrick 0-1.		G Glynn 0-5, P Donoghue 1-0, G Holland 1-0, A Fenton 0-3, PJ Molloy 0-2, M Donoghue 0-1.	Referee: S O'Connor (Limerick)

20 August 1972 Semi-final	Antrim	2-08 - 4-12	Dublin	Glenariffe
	J McClean 1-2, A Thornbury 1-0, M Brunty 0-3, S McFadden 0-2, J O'Neill 0-1.		C Henneberry 1-2, J Kealy 0-5, B Donovan 1-0, P Lee 1-0, D Moody 1-0, C McGrath 0-3, V Holden 0-2.	Referee: E Devlin (Tyrone)

Final

10 September 1972 Final	Galway	2-09 - 1-10	Dublin	Gaelic Grounds, Limerick
	G Holland 1-4, A Fenton 1-0, PJ Molloy 0-3, G Glynn 0-1, M Barrett 0-1.		B Sweeney 1-0, J Kealy 0-3, PJ Holden 0-2, J Whelan 0-2, P Lee 0-2, G O'Connell 0-1.	Referee: S O'Grady (Limerick)

== Championship statistics ==
=== Miscellaneous ===
- The All-Ireland final between Galway and Dublin was the very first championship meeting between the two teams. Both sides were hoping to win their first All-Ireland title.
