= Pat Quigley =

Irish hurler

Personal information
- Native name: Pádraig Ó Coigligh (Irish)
- Born: 11 June 1946 (age 80) Rathnure, County Wexford, Ireland
- Occupations: Business and Accounting Lecturer
- Height: 5 ft 9 in (175 cm)

Sport
- Sport: Hurling
- Position: Centre-forward
Club
- Years: Club
- 1960s-1970s: Rathnure
Inter-county
- Years: County
- 1966-1970: Wexford
Inter-county titles
- Leinster titles: 1
- All-Irelands: 0
- NHL: 1
- All Stars: 0

Pat Quigley (born 11 June 1946 in Rathnure, County Wexford, Ireland) is an Irish retired sportsperson. He played hurling with his local club Rathnure and was a member of the Wexford senior inter-county team from 1965 until 1970.
