= 1971 All-Ireland Intermediate Hurling Championship =

Championship Details
- Dates: 28 March – 19 September 1971
- Teams: 18

All Ireland Champions
- Winners: Tipperary (3rd win)
- Captain: Éamonn Butler

All Ireland Runners-up
- Runners-up: Wicklow
- Captain: Mick O'Brien

Provincial Champions
- Munster: Tipperary
- Leinster: Wicklow
- Ulster: Down
- Connacht: Not Played

The 1971 All-Ireland Intermediate Hurling Championship was the 11th staging of the All-Ireland Intermediate Hurling Championship since its establishment by the Gaelic Athletic Association in 1961. The championship ran from 28 March to 19 September 1971.

Antrim were the defending champions, however, they availed of their right to promotion to the All-Ireland Senior Hurling Championship and did not field a team.

The All-Ireland final was played at Nowlan Park in Kilkenny on 19 September 1971 between Tipperary and Wicklow, in what was their first ever championship meeting. Tipperary won the match by 3-16 to 3-13 to claim their third All-Ireland title overall and a first title in five years.

== Leinster Intermediate Hurling Championship ==
=== Leinster first round ===
28 March 1971 First round	Meath	5-10 - 2-05	Offaly	St. Loman's Park
	S Gohery 2-2, TJ O'Reilly 2-0, F Gleeson 1-2, M Garrigan 0-3, M McCabe 0-2, R Melia 0-1.		J Roche 1-1, G Woods 1-0, D Sullivan 0-1, P Heenan 0-1, J Nestor 0-1, N Quinn 0-1.

28 March 1971 First round	Carlow	2-08 - 3-04	Laois	Dr. Cullen Park
	J Walsh 1-0, W Walsh 1-0, L Walsh 0-3, P McNally 0-1, J Byrne 0-1, T Whelan 0-1, E Quirke 0-1.		L Dollard 2-0, M Dalton 1-1, G Lanham 0-3.

28 March 1971 First round	Wicklow	2-17 - 1-09	Wexford	Aughrim County Ground

28 March 1971 First round	Kilkenny	3-09 - 3-09	Dublin	Nowlan Park
	K Purcell 1-3, J O'Shea 0-4, N Murphy 1-0, P Tierney 1-0, M Phelan 0-2.		N Kinsella 2-3, W Doran 1-0, M Kelly 0-3, S Kinsella 0-2, P Storey 0-1.

23 May 1971 First round replay	Dublin	4-02 - 3-04	Kilkenny	O'Toole Park
	K Hegarty 2-0, T Flynn 1-0, W Walsh 1-0, J Doran 0-1, S Kinsella 0-1.		L Ryan 2-0, M Murphy 1-2, G Meehan 0-1, W Maher 0-1.

=== Leinster second round ===
23 May 1971 Second round	Louth	4-04 - 4-11	Carlow	O'Toole Park
	P Rice 2-0, D Callan 1-2, J Nash 1-0, M Rice 0-2.		L Walsh 3-4, J Walsh 1-2, W Quirke 0-2, W O'Rourke 0-1, J Byrne 0-1, MM Morrissey 0-1.

=== Leinster semi-finals ===
13 June 1971 Semi-final	Wicklow	2-11 - 3-04	Carlow	Gorey Grounds
	M Delaney 0-7, W Hilliard 1-1, T Scott 1-0, S Doyle 0-3.		L Walsh 3-1, J Walsh 0-1, P McNally 0-1, T Byrne 0-1.

11 July 1971 Semi-final	Meath	2-12 - 3-10	Dublin	St. Loman's Park
	S Kearney 0-7, J Curtin 1-1, TJ O'Reilly 1-0, S Boylan 0-1, R Melia 0-1, P Christie 0-1, M McCabe 0-1.		P Storey 2-2, F Spellman 0-4, N Kinsella 1-0, W Walsh 0-1, J Byrne 0-1, S Kinsella 0-1, T Ryan 0-1.

=== Leinster final ===
18 July 1971 Final	Wicklow	1-15 - 2-09	Dublin	Dr. Cullen Park
	M O'Brien 1-3, M Delaney 0-5, T Morrissey 0-4, M Jordan 0-2, J Brennan 0-1.		M Kinsella 1-2, F Spellman 0-4, W Walsh 1-0, M Kelly 0-1, S Dunningham 0-1, S Kinsella 0-1.

== Munster Intermediate Hurling Championship ==
=== Munster quarter-finals ===
21 April 1971 Quarter-final	Kerry	2-11 - 4-04	Cork	Austin Stack Park
	D Lovett 1-7, P Moriarty 1-0, F Thornton 0-2, T McEnery 0-2.		C Kelly 2-2, K McSweeney 1-1, S Farrell 1-0, P O'Neill 0-1.

25 April 1971 Quarter-final	Clare	4-04 - 2-02	Waterford	Gaelic Grounds
	Milo Keane 2-0, C Carew 1-1, J O'Leary 1-0, V Arthur 0-2, N Jordan 0-1.		J Flynn 1-1, M Brazil 1-0, T Reid 0-1.

=== Munster semi-finals ===
5 May 1971 Semi-final	Clare	2-06 - 2-06	Limerick	Cusack Park
	N Jordan 2-1, V Arthur 0-2, M Keogh 0-1, M Keane 0-1, S Keyes 0-1.		S Burke 2-1, P Ryan 0-2, B O'Brien 0-2, G Neenan 0-1.

15 May 1971 Semi-final	Kerry	4-08 - 5-10	Tipperary	Austin Stack Park
	D Lovett 1-5, F Thornton 2-0, J O'Sullivan 1-0, P Moriarty 0-2, T Kirby 0-1.		E Butler 2-1, D Ryan 1-2, P Lowry 1-1, J Barry 0-4, J Carey 1-0, JP McDonald 0-2.

28 May 1971 Semi-final replay	Limerick	1-14 - 4-01	Clare	Gaelic Grounds
	S Bourke 0-6, P O'Brien 0-5, P Ryan 1-0, D Ryan 0-2, K Murphy 0-1.		Michael Keane 2-0, J McCarthy 1-1, Milo Keane 1-0.

=== Munster final ===
21 July 1971 Final	Limerick	2-04 - 1-11	Tipperary	FitzGerald Park
	P Ryan 1-0, S Burke 1-0, R Prendergast 0-3, F Costello 0-1.		P O'Neill 0-5, J Carey 1-0, P Quinlan 0-2, E Butler 0-1, P Lowry 0-1, S Power 0-1, D Ryan 0-1.

== Ulster Intermediate Hurling Championship ==
=== Ulster final ===
11 July 1971 Final	Antrim	1-12 - 5-08	Down	St. Patrick's Park

== All-Ireland Intermediate Hurling Championship ==
=== All-Ireland quarter-final ===
8 August 1971 Quarter-final	Galway	3-10 - 2-09	Down	Croke Park
	L Mulrane 1-1, T O'Hara 1-1, C Stanley 1-1, T Ryan 0-4, S Quinn 0-2, C Cotten 0-1.		B Gilmore 0-5, M Coleman 1-1, S Hollywood 1-0, B Faloona 0-2, P Braniff 0-1.

=== All-Ireland semi-finals ===
29 August 1971 Semi-final	Wicklow	3-11 - 4-06	London	Aughrim County Ground
	M Delaney 1-5, T Morrissey 1-1, W Hilliard 1-1, M O'Brien 0-2, M Jordan 0-1, S Doyle 0-1.		T Frehill 2-1, J O'Leary 1-2, M Quinlan 1-0, A Gordon 0-3.

29 August 1971 Semi-final	Galway	3-05 - 2-16	Tipperary	Portumna Grounds
	J Quinn 3-0, C Stanley 0-2, PJ Molloy 0-1, T O'Hara 0-1, J Norris 0-1.		J Barry 1-1, J Carey 1-1, S Power 0-3, J Noonan 0-3, P Lowry 0-3, B Teehan 0-2, JP McDonnell 0-2, E Butler 0-1.

=== All-Ireland final ===
19 September 1971 Final	Tipperary	3-16 - 3-13	Wicklow	Nowlan Park
	P Lowry 2-6, S Power 1-3, PJ McDonald 0-2, B Teehan 0-2, J Noonan 0-2, S Barry 0-1.		M Delaney 1-9, J Doyle 1-1, W Hilliard 1-0, M O'Brien 0-1, T Morrissey 0-1, T Scott 0-1.	Referee: N Dalton (Waterford)
