= 1981 Tipperary Senior Hurling Championship =

Annual hurling competition season

- Dates: 23 August - 25 October 1981
- Teams: 8
- Champions: Borris-Ileigh (4th title); Timmy Stapleton (captain)
- Runners-up: Roscrea; Roger Ryan (captain)

Tournament statistics
- Matches played: 8
- Goals scored: 28 (3.5 per match)
- Points scored: 186 (23.25 per match)
- Top scorer(s): Francis Loughnane (1-22)

The 1981 Tipperary Senior Hurling Championship was the 90th staging of the Tipperary Senior Hurling Championship since its establishment by the Tipperary County Board in 1887.

Roscrea were the defending champions.

On 25 October 1981, Borris-Ileigh won the championship after a 1–14 to 0–12 defeat of Roscrea in the final at Semple Stadium. It was their fourth championship title overall and their first title since 1953.

== Results ==
=== Quarter-finals ===
23 August 1981 Quarter-final	Moycarkey-Borris	4-13 - 1-16	Carrick Swans	Semple Stadium
	J Caesar 3-1, J Flanagan 1-6, E Darmody 0-3, P Flanagan 0-2, T Quigley 0-1.		S Fitzpatrick 1-10, M Faulkner 0-2, M Walsh 0-2, T Fitzpatrick 0-1, A Waters 0-1.

23 August 1981 Quarter-final	Holycross-Ballycahill	4-10 - 0-14	St. Mary's	Semple Stadium
	M Quinlan 2-0, M Doyle 1-2, P Lowry 0-4, L Gorman 1-0, M McGrath 0-2, R Stakelum 0-2.		W Peters 0-5, P Butler 0-2, S O'Neill 0-2, M Carroll 0-1, J Walsh 0-1, J Smith 0-1, F Kelly 0-1, P O'Neill 0-1.

30 August 1981 Quarter-final	Roscrea	1-12 - 2-08	Cashel King Cormacs	Semple Stadium
	F Loughnane 1-3, G O'Connor 0-4, P Queally 0-2, L Spooner 0-1, J Shanahan 0-1, J Stone 0-1.		T Grogan 0-5, B Ryan 1-0, Peter Fitzelle 1-0, Pat Fitzelle 0-1, J Minogue 0-1, M Byrne 0-1.

30 August 1981 Quarter-final	Borris-Ileigh	2-19 - 1-07	Éire Óg Annacarty	Semple Stadium
	N O'Dwyer 0-8, P Kavanagh 1-2, T O'Dwyer 1-1, P Ryan 0-2, P Kenny 0-2, L Carroll 0-2, T Ryan 0-1, B Kenny 0-1.		M Ryan 1-2, A Buckley 0-3, S Fox 0-2.

=== Semi-finals ===
4 October 1981 Semi-final	Borris-Ileigh	1-15 - 3-08	Moycarkey-Borris	Páirc Shíleáin
	N O'Dwyer 0-8, B Kenny 1-1, P Kenny 0-4, B Ryan 0-2.		J Ryan 2-0, J Caesar 1-2, J Flanagan 0-4, T Quigley 0-1, T Mullins 0-1.

4 October 1981 Semi-final	Roscrea	2-09 - 3-06	Holycross-Ballycahill	Páirc Shíleáin
	F Loughnane 0-5, R Ryan 1-0, J Stone 1-0, J Tynan 0-2, J Shanahan 0-1, G O'Connor 0-1.		L O'Gorman 2-0, J Doyle 1-0, M McGrath 0-3, M Doyle 0-1, P Lowry 0-1, R Stakelum 0-1.

18 October 1981 Semi-final replay	Roscrea	1-15 - 2-06	Holycross-Ballycahill	Páirc Shíleáin
	F Loughnane 0-7, G O'Connor 1-2, J Stone 0-2, P Loughnane 0-2, R Dunne 0-1, J Tynan 0-1.		T Stakelum 1-2, J Doyle 1-0, M McGrath 0-3, M Butler 0-1.	Referee: G Ryan (Lattin-Cullen)

=== Final ===
25 October 1981 Final	Borris-Ileigh	1-14 - 0-12	Roscrea	Semple Stadium
	N O'Dwyer 0-8, T O'Dwyer 1-1, M Ivors 0-2, B Ryan 0-2, P Ryan 0-1.		F Loughnane 0-7, J Tynan 0-2, P Queally 0-2, J Stone 0-1.	Referee: L Carroll (Clonmel)

== Championship statistics ==
=== Top scorers ===
Overall

Rank	Player	Club	Tally	Total	Matches	Average
1	Francis Loughnane	Roscrea	1-22	25	4	6.25
2	Noel O'Dwyer	Borris-Ileaigh	0-24	24	3	8.00
3	Jack Caesar	Moycarkey-Borris	4-03	15	2	7.50
4	Seán Fitzpatrick	Carrick Swans	1-10	13	1	13.00
4	John Flanagan	Moycarkey-Borris	1-10	13	2	6.50
6	Ger O'Connor	Roscrea	1-07	10	4	2.50
7	Liam O'Gorman	Holycross-Ballycahill	3-00	9	2	4.50
8	Tommy O'Dwyer	Borris-Ileigh	2-02	8	3	2.66
8	Michael McGrath	Holycross-Ballycahill	0-08	8	3	2.66
10	John Stone	Borris-Ileigh	1-04	7	4	1.75

In a single game

Rank	Player	Club	Tally	Total	Opposition
1	Seán Fitzpatrick	Carrick Swans	1-10	13	Moycarkey-Borris
2	Jack Caesar	Moycarkey-Borris	3-01	10	Carrick Swans
3	John Flanagan	Moycarkey-Borris	1-06	9	Carrick Swans
4	Noel O'Dwyer	Borris-Ileaigh	0-08	8	Éire Óg Annacarty
4	Noel O'Dwyer	Borris-Ileaigh	0-08	8	Moycarkey-Borris
4	Noel O'Dwyer	Borris-Ileaigh	0-08	8	Roscrea
7	Francis Loughnane	Roscrea	0-07	7	Holycross-Ballycahill
7	Francis Loughnane	Roscrea	0-07	7	Borris-Ileigh
9	Matt Quinlan	Holycross-Ballycahill	2-00	6	St. Mary's
9	John Ryan	Moycarkey-Borris	2-00	6	Borris-Ileigh
9	Francis Loughnane	Roscrea	1-03	6	Cashel King Cormacs
