= 1967 All-Ireland Under-21 Hurling Championship final =

1967 All-Ireland Under-21 Hurling Championship Final
- Event: 1967 All-Ireland Under-21 Hurling Championship
Tipperary	Dublin
1-8	1-7
- Date: 10 September 1967
- Venue: Croke Park, Dublin
- Referee: Aubrey Higgins (Galway)

The 1967 All-Ireland Under-21 Hurling Championship final was a hurling match that was played at Croke Park, Dublin on 10 September 1967 to determine the winners of the 1967 All-Ireland Under-21 Hurling Championship, the 4th season of the All-Ireland Under-21 Hurling Championship, a tournament organised by the Gaelic Athletic Association for the champion teams of the four provinces of Ireland. The final was contested by Tipperary of Munster and Dublin of Leinster, with Tipperary winning by 1-8 to 1-7.

The All-Ireland final between Tipperary and Dublin was their first championship meeting. Tipperary, appearing in their third final, were hoping to win their second title in four years. Dublin, appearing in their first final, were hoping to win their first All-Ireland title.

Tipperary's All-Ireland victory was their second in four years. The victory put them in first position on the all-time roll of honour.

Dublin's All-Ireland final appearance was their last until 1972.

== Match ==
=== Details ===
10 September 1967

Tipperary	1-8 - 1-7	Dublin
P O'Connor 1-3, J Flanagan 0-3, J Ryan 0-1, T Delaney 0-1.		T Grealish 1-1, H Dalton 0-2, N Kinsella 0-1, E Davey 0-1, L Hennebury 0-1, E McGrath 0-1.

Croke Park
Referee: A Higgins (Galway)
