= 1967 All-Ireland Under-21 Hurling Championship =

All-Ireland Under-21 Hurling Championship 1967
Championship Details
- Dates: 14 May – 3 September 1967

All Ireland Champions
- Winners: Tipperary (2nd win)
- Captain: P. J. Ryan

All Ireland Runners-up
- Runners-up: Dublin

Provincial Champions
- Munster: Tipperary
- Leinster: Dublin
- Ulster: Antrim
- Connacht: Not Played

Championship Statistics
- Matches Played: 15

The 1967 All-Ireland Under-21 Hurling Championship was the fourth staging of the All-Ireland Under-21 Hurling Championship. The championship began on 14 May and ended on 3 September 1967.

Tipperary won the title after defeating Dublin by 1–8 to 1–7 in the final.

== Teams ==
=== Team summaries ===
Leinster	Munster	Ulster
Carlow; Dublin; Kildare; Kilkenny; Laois; Offaly; Wexford; Westmeath	Clare; Cork; Galway; Kerry; Limerick; Tipperary; Waterford	Antrim

== Results ==
=== Leinster Under-21 Hurling Championship ===
2 April 1967	Laois	[6-7 - 4-3]	Kilkenny	Kelly Daly Park

2 April 1967	Meath	1-12 - 3-6	Wicklow	Páirc Tailteann

2 April 1967	Carlow	1-3 - 5-15	Dublin	Dr. Cullen Park

2 April 1967	Kildare	2-6 - 4-11	Wexford	Geraldine Park

2 April 1967	Westmeath	2-2 - 7-10	Offaly	Cusack Park

30 April 1967 Semi-final	Offaly	5-14 - 3-4	Laois	St. Brendan's Park

14 May 1967 First round replay	Meath	2-6 - 2-9	Wicklow

4 June 1967 Semi-final	Dublin	4-9 - 3-10	Wexford	Nowlan Park

25 June 1967 Final	Dublin	2-10 - 2-9	Offaly	Croke Park

=== Munster Under-21 Hurling Championship ===
First round

23 April 1967 First round	Galway	4-09 - 3-07	Cork	Gaelic Grounds, Limerick
	JJ Murray 1-2, K Hanniffy 1-2, P Fahy 1-1, J Kearins 1-0, D Coen 0-2, J Connolly 0-1, J Canning 0-1.		C McCarthy 1-2, P Riordan 1-1, J Archer 1-0, M Kenneally 0-3, P Hegarty 0-1.	Referee: G Fitzgerald

23 April 1967 First round	Kerry	0-04 - 9-12	Tipperary	Austin Stack Park, Tralee
	G McEnery 0-1, G Nolan 0-1, Joe McGrath 0-1, C Flaherty 0-1.		Jack Ryan 4-1, J Flanagan 3-2, R Dwan 1-2, T Delaney 1-1, S O'Dwyer 0-3, D Foley 0-2, L Moran 0-1.

23 April 1967 First round	Limerick	1-08 - 2-08	Clare	Gaelic Grounds, Limerick
	A Dunworth 1-1, É Grimes 0-4, B Savage 0-1, T Moloney 0-1, P Fogarty 0-1.		P Higgins 1-3, P Russell 1-1, L Griffin 0-2, P Coffey 0-1, V Arthurs 0-1.

Semi-finals

11 June 1967 Semi-final	Tipperary	4-12 - 3-06	Clare	Thurles Sportsfield, Thurles
	J Flanagan 3-5, C Davitt 1-0, PJ Ryan 0-3, Jack Ryan 0-3, J Walshe 0-1.		L Griffin 1-2, L Maloney 1-0, D Fitzgerald 1-0, B Higgins 0-2, P Higgins 0-1, G Hogan 0-1.

11 June 1967 Semi-final	Waterford	5-08 - 5-12	Galway	MacDonagh Park, Nenagh
	L Canning 2-0, D Mahon 1-2, B Power 1-1, P Enright 0-4, W Walsh 1-0, S Murray 0-1.		S Coen 3-1, K Hanniffy 1-3, P Fahy 1-2, T Quinn 0-3, J Connolly 0-2, D Coen 0-1.

Final

16 July 1967 Final	Tipperary	3-09 - 3-05	Galway	Gaelic Grounds, Limerick
	J Flanagan 2-5, PJ Ryan 1-3, D Lowry 0-1.		F Canning 2-0, D Coen 1-0, J Connolly 0-2, S Coen 0-2, P Fahy 0-1.	Referee: S O'Connor (Limerick)

=== Ulster Under-21 Hurling Championship ===
4 June 1967 Final	Down	2-7 - 3-8	Antrim	St. Patrick's Park

=== All-Ireland Under-21 Hurling Championship ===
3 September 1967 Final	Tipperary	1-8 - 1-7	Dublin	Croke Park
				Referee: A Higgins
