= Ned O'Gorman (hurler) =

Irish hurler (1921–1990)

Personal information
- Nickname: The Rock
- Born: Edmond O'Gorman; 7 November 1921 Holycross, County Tipperary, Ireland
- Died: December 1990 (aged 69) Holycross, County Tipperary, Ireland
- Occupations: Publican, farmer
- Height: 5 ft 11 in (180 cm)

Sport
- Sport: Hurling
- Position: Full-forward
Club
- Years: Club
- Holycross-Ballycahill
Club titles
- Tipperary titles: 3
Inter-county
- Years: County
- 1948–1949: Tipperary
Inter-county titles
- Munster titles: 1
- All-Irelands: 1
- NHL: 1

Edmond "Ned" O'Gorman (7 November 1921 – December 1990) was an Irish hurler. At club level he played with Holycross-Ballycahill, and also lined out at inter-county level with the Tipperary senior hurling team.

== Career ==
O'Gorman first played hurling at club level, alongside his brother Denis O'Gorman, with Holycross-Ballycahill. After progressing from the minor ranks, he was a member of the club's senior team that captured three Tipperary SHC titles during a golden age for the club between 1948 and 1954. O'Gorman also won a Mid Tipperary SHC medal in 1947.

O'Gorman's performances at club level earned a call-up to the Tipperary senior hurling team. He won National Hurling League and Munster SHC medals in 1949, and was a non-playing substitute when Tipperary beat Laois in the 1949 All-Ireland final.

== Death ==
O'Gorman died after a period of ill health in December 1990, aged 69.

== Honours ==
Holycross-Ballycahill

- Tipperary Senior Hurling Championship: 1948, 1951, 1954
- Mid Tipperary Senior Hurling Championship: 1947, 1948, 1951, 1954

Tipperary

- All-Ireland Senior Hurling Championship: 1949
- Munster Senior Hurling Championship: 1949
- National Hurling League: 1948–49
