= Bob Stakelum =

Irish hurler and Gaelic footballer (1922–2010)

Personal information
- Nickname: Bob
- Born: Robert Anthony Stakelum; 22 December 1922 Dublin, Ireland
- Died: 17 January 2010 (aged 87) Nenagh, County Tipperary, Ireland
- Occupation: Sales rep
- Height: 5 ft 9 in (175 cm)

Sport
- Sport: Dual player
- Position: Right wing-forward
Club
- Years: Club
- Holycross-Ballycahill
Club titles
- Tipperary titles: 3
Inter-county
- Years: County
- 1948–1952 1953–1956: Tipperary (SF); Tipperary (SF)
Inter-county titles
- Munster titles: 1
- All-Irelands: 1
- NHL: 1

Robert Anthony Stakelum (22 December 1922 – 17 January 2010) was an Irish hurler, Gaelic footballer, referee and administrator. At club level he played with Holycross-Ballycahill, and also lined out at inter-county level with various Tipperary teams.

== Playing career ==
Stakelum first played Gaelic games at club level with Holycross-Ballycahill. After progressing from the minor ranks, he was a member of the club's senior team that captured three Tipperary SHC titles during a golden age for the club between 1948 and 1954. Stakelum also won a Mid Tipperary SHC medal in 1947.

Stakelum's inter-county career with Tipperary began with the senior team in 1948. He won National Hurling League and Munster SHC medals alongside his cousin Pat Stakelum on the field of play in 1949, and was a non-playing substitute when Tipperary beat Laois in the 1949 All-Ireland final.

Stakelum also represented Tipperary in Gaelic football. He won a Munster JFC medal in 1952, before spending four years with the senior team.

== Administrative career ==
Stakelum became involved in club and inter-county refereeing while still a player. He took charge of Munster finals in both Gaelic football and hurling, while he also refereed the 1955 All-Ireland final between Wexford and Galway.

As an administrator, Stakelum was just 24 when he became the Holycross-Ballycahill club secretary. He spent a decade in this role before returning for a second spell in 1960. Beginning in 1963, Stakelum spent seven years as club chairman, while he was also spent five years as his club's delegate to the County Board. He became President of the id Tipperary Board in 1993.

== Personal life and death ==
Stakelum spent his entire working life with Dwan's Mineral Waters in Thurles. He married Catherine "Kit" Corcoran in 1953 and the couple had three sons; Robert, Tony and Tim. All three followed in their father's footsteps by playing with Holycross-Ballycahill, while Rovert and Tony also played at various levels with Tipperary.

Stakelum died on 17 January 2010, at the age of 87.

== Honours ==
Holycross-Ballycahill

- Tipperary Senior Hurling Championship: 1948, 1951, 1954
- Mid Tipperary Senior Hurling Championship: 1947, 1948, 1951, 1954

Tipperary

- All-Ireland Senior Hurling Championship: 1949
- Munster Senior Hurling Championship: 1949
- National Hurling League: 1948–49
- Munster Junior Football Championship: 1952
