= Pat Stakelum =

Irish hurler (1927–2008)

Personal information
- Native name: Pádraig Steaclúm (Irish)
- Born: 6 May 1927 Holycross, County Tipperary, Ireland
- Died: 4 April 2008 (aged 80) Thurles, County Tipperary, Ireland
- Occupations: C&C employee
- Height: 5 ft 9 in (175 cm)

Sport
- Sport: Hurling
- Position: Centre-back
Clubs
- Years: Club
- 1946–1949 1950 1951–1964: Holycross–Ballycahill; Young Irelands; Holycross–Ballycahill
Club titles
- Tipperary titles: 3
Inter-county
- Years: County
- 1947–1958: Tipperary
Inter-county titles
- Munster titles: 3
- All-Irelands: 3
- NHL: 6

Patrick Stakelum (6 May 1927 – 4 April 2008) was an Irish hurling selector, administrator and player. At club level, he played with Holycross–Ballycahill and Young Irelands and at inter-county level was a member of the Tipperary senior hurling team from 1947 to 1958. Stakelum captained Tipperary to the All-Ireland SHC title in 1949.

== Early life ==
Stakelum played hurling at all levels during his time as a student at Thurles CBS and was a mainstay of the school's Dr Harty Cup team. His performances in that competition resulted in his inclusion on the Munster Colleges team that defeated Leinster Colleges in consecutive All-Ireland finals in 1945 and 1946.

== Club career ==
Stakelum played his club hurling with Holycross–Ballycahill. He won four Mid Tipperary SHC medals between 1947 and 1954. Stakelum claimed his first Tipperary SHC medal in 1948, following a 4–10 to 2–04 win over Lorrha in the final. He won further Tipperary SHC honours in 1951 and 1954, after respective defeats of Clonoulty and Roscrea.

== Inter-county career ==
Stakelum first appeared on the inter-county scene with Tipperary in 1945, as captain of the minor team that won the Munster MHC title after a 32–point win over Clare. He subsequently captained Tipperary to a defeat by Dublin in the 1945 All-Ireland MHC final.

After immediately progressing to the junior team, Stakelum made his senior team debut in 1947. Success at club level resulted in him being appointed team captain for the 1949 season. That year, Stakelum was part of the Tipperary side that won the National Hurling League, as well as the Munster SHC title after a 1–16 to 2–10 win over Limerick. He captained the team from wing-back when Tipperary later beat Laois by 3–11 to 0–03 in the 1949 All-Ireland SHC final.

The following year, Stakelum, who was now moved to centre-back, won a second consecutive National League medal. He later won a second consecutive Munster SHC medal, following a 2–17 to 3–11 win over Cork. Stakelum ended the year by claiming a second consecutive All-Ireland SHC medal, following Tipperary's a one-point win over Kilkenny in the 1950 All-Ireland SHC final.

Stakelum claimed a third successive Munster SHC medal in 1951, as Cork were once again beaten in the final. He later won a third successive All-Ireland SHC medal, again lining out at centre-back, in the 7–07 to 3–09 win over Wexford in the 1951 All-Ireland SHC final. Stakelum won further National League honours in 1952, 1954, 1955 and 1957, before retiring from inter-county hurling in 1958.

== Inter-provincial career ==
Stakelum's performances with Tipperary resulted in his selection for the Munster inter-provincial team. As a mainstay of the team for eight consecutive years between 1950 to 1957, he won six Railway Cup medals.

== Post-playing career ==
Stakelum moved into the administrative side of the GAA following his retirement from inter-county activity. He served as secretary of the Tipperary County Board in 1961 and 1962, a period which saw Tipperary win consecutive All-Ireland SHC titles. Stakelum was a founder-member of the Dúrlas Óg juvenile club in Thurles in 1979 and served as president for nearly 40 years. He also spent two years as a selector with the Tipperary senior team in 1985 and 1986.

== Personal life and death ==
Stakelum was born in Holycross, County Tipperary. He worked at Dwan's Mineral Waters for many years, a company which later became C&C. His wife, Nancy Finn, was known locally as a violinist in an orchestra, and the couple had five children. Stakelum's nephews, Richard and Conor Stakelum and Bobby and Aidan Ryan, were also All-Ireland SHC-winners with Tipperary. His grandnephew, Declan Hannon, is an All-Ireland-winning captain with Limerick.

Stakelum died after a period of ill health on 4 April 2008, at the age of 80.

== Honours ==
Holycross–Ballycahill GAA

- Tipperary Senior Hurling Championship: 1948, 1951, 1954
- Mid Tipperary Senior Hurling Championship: 1947, 1948, 1951, 1954

Tipperary

- All-Ireland Senior Hurling Championship: 1949 (c), 1950, 1951
- Munster Senior Hurling Championship: 1949 (c), 1950, 1951
- National Hurling League: 1948–49 (c), 1949–50, 1951–52, 1953–54, 1954–55, 1956–57
- Munster Minor Hurling Championship: 1945 (c)

Munster

- Railway Cup: 1950, 1951, 1952, 1953, 1955, 1957

Sporting positions
Preceded by Willie Wall	Tipperary senior hurling team captain 1949	Succeeded by Seán Kenny
Preceded by Jimmy Finn	Tipperary senior hurling team captain 1952	Succeeded by Tommy Doyle
Preceded by Phil Purcell	Secretary of the Tipperary County Board; 1961-1963	Succeeded by Tommy Barrett
Achievements
Preceded by Jim Ware	All-Ireland SHC final winning captain 1949	Succeeded by Seán Kenny
Awards
Preceded by Bobby Rackard; Billy Rackard	GAA All-Time All-Star Award; 1993	Succeeded by Martin White
