= Galway–Tipperary hurling rivalry =

Galway-Tipperary
- Location: County Galway; County Tipperary
- Teams: Galway; Tipperary
- First meeting: Tipperary 1-01 - 0-00 Galway; 1887 All-Ireland final (1 April 1888)
- Latest meeting: Galway 2-17 - 1-28 Tipperary; 2025 All-Ireland Quarter-Final (21 June 2025)

Statistics
- Total meetings: 32
- Most wins: Tipperary (22)
- Top scorer: Séamus Callanan (7-31)
- All-time series: Tipperary 22-10 Galway

The Galway–Tipperary fixture is a traditional hurling rivalry dating back to 1888. Tipperary have traditionally been one of the strongest teams in the Munster Championship while Galway have won five All-Ireland Senior hurling titles, including defeating Tipperary in the 1988 All-Ireland Hurling Final. There is no present Connacht Championship, so since 2009 Galway have played in the Leinster Senior Hurling Championship.

== History ==
The rivalry kicked into gear in the 1980s, when Galway came to force. In 1980, when Galway won their first All Ireland title since 1923, Tipperary were still in the Senior hurling doldrums. The two counties had done battle a few times, but from 1887 until 1986, Galway had only won one encounter. In the 1980s, however, Galway took control. These battles at the time (87-93) were ferocious. Even Present managers Cyril Farrell (Galway) and Michael 'Babs' Keating (Tipperary) got involved. Between 1959 and 1969, Galway played in the Munster Senior Hurling Championship. Seeing as there was no credible Hurling team in Connacht, Galway automatically entered the All-Ireland Semi-final or into the first round of the Qualifiers after that system was introduced. Galway now play in Leinster for a three-year trial period. These teams met each other in the first ever All-Ireland Senior hurling final in 1887 (though played in 1888).

In 2010, a stoppage time winner from Lar Corbett gave Tipperary a one point victory in an All-Ireland quarter-final at Croke Park, with Tipperary going on to win the All-Ireland title.

In 2014, the sides played each other in the first round of the qualifiers at Semple Stadium on 5 July. With 19 minutes remaining Galway had a six point lead but Tipperary went on to outscore Galway by 2-10 to 0-1 in the remainder of the match to win on a 3-25 to 4-13 scoreline.

On 16 August 2015 the two sides met in the semi-final of the 2015 All-Ireland Championship at Croke Park. Galway won the game by one point with an injury time score coming from Shane Moloney at the hill 16 end. The teams were level on 10 occasions and in the second half the lead changed hands six times. Séamus Callanan scored 3-9 (3-4 from play) to win the man of the match award but ended up on the losing team. It was Eamon O'Shea's last game as Tipperary manager as he was stepping down at the conclusion of the 2015 Championship.

On 14 August 2016 the two sides met for the third year in a row in the semi-final of the 2016 All-Ireland Senior Hurling Championship at Croke Park. Galway had a 1-10 to 0-11 point lead at half time, but two second half goals for Tipperary in the last ten minutes from substitute John O'Dwyer and John McGrath put Tipperary into a three-point lead. Galway reduced the lead down to one point but Tipperary held on to reach the final which they went on to win.

In 2017, in the All-Ireland semi-final on 6 August, Joe Canning scored an injury time winning point from the right sideline against defending champions Tipperary as Galway won by a point and qualified for the 2017 All-Ireland Senior Hurling Championship Final.

In November 2020, the two teams met in the quarter-finals of the 2020 All-Ireland Senior Hurling Championship with no supporters present due to the COVID-19 pandemic. Galway won the game by 3-23 to 2-24 with a late goal by Aidan Harte putting them in front by a point in the 66th minute where they held on to win by two points.

=== Statistics ===
Totals for Galway includes 25 Connacht Senior Hurling Championship's and 2 Leinster Senior Hurling Championship's.

Team	All-Ireland	Provincial	National League	Total
Galway	5	27	10	42
Tipperary	28	42	20	89
Combined	32	69	30	131

== All time results ==
=== Legend ===
Galway win
Tipperary win
Drawn game

=== Senior ===
No.	Date	Winners	Score	Runners-up	Venue	Stage
1.	1 April 1888	Tipperary (1)	1-01 - 0-00	Galway	Birr	All-Ireland final
2.	17 December 1899	Tipperary (2)	7-12 - 3-09	Galway	Athenry	All-Ireland semi-final
3.	21 September 1902	Tipperary (3)	6-14 - 1-06	Galway	Terenure	All-Ireland home final
4.	8 September 1907	Tipperary (4)	7-14 - 0-02	Galway	Markets Field	All-Ireland semi-final
5.	14 February 1909	Tipperary (5)	5-15 - 1-00	Galway	Markets Field	All-Ireland semi-final
6.	17 October 1909	Tipperary (6)	6-7 - 5-07	Galway	Markets Field	All-Ireland semi-final
7.	22 October 1916	Tipperary (7)	8-01 - 0-00	Galway	Athlone	All-Ireland semi-final
8.	26 August 1923	Tipperary (8)	3-02 - 1-03	Galway	Galway	All-Ireland semi-final
9.	23 November 1924	Galway (1)	3-01 - 2-03	Tipperary	Croke Park	All-Ireland semi-final
10.	6 September 1925	Tipperary (9)	5-06 - 1-05	Galway	Croke Park	All-Ireland final
11.	17 August 1930	Tipperary (10)	6-08 - 2-02	Galway	St. Brendan's Park	All-Ireland semi-final
12.	13 August 1950	Tipperary (11)	4-07 - 2-06	Galway	Croke Park	All-Ireland semi-final
13.	7 September 1958	Tipperary (12)	4-09 - 2-05	Galway	Croke Park	All-Ireland final
14.	2 July 1961	Tipperary (13)	7-12 - 5-06	Galway	Cusack Park	Munster semi-final
15.	15 August 1971	Tipperary (14)	3-26 - 6-08	Galway	St. Brendan's Park	All-Ireland semi-final
16.	9 August 1987	Galway (2)	3-20 - 2-17	Tipperary	Croke Park	All-Ireland semi-final
17.	4 September 1988	Galway (3)	1-15 - 0-14	Tipperary	Croke Park	All-Ireland final
18.	6 August 1989	Tipperary (15)	1-17 - 2-11	Galway	Croke Park	All-Ireland semi-final
19.	4 August 1991	Tipperary (16)	3-13 - 1-09	Galway	Croke Park	All-Ireland semi-final
20.	8 August 1993	Galway (4)	1-16 - 1-14	Tipperary	Croke Park	All-Ireland semi-final
21.	23 July 2000	Galway (5)	1-14 - 0-15	Tipperary	Croke Park	All-Ireland quarter-final
22.	9 September 2001	Tipperary (17)	2-18 - 2-15	Galway	Croke Park	All-Ireland final
23.	13 July 2003	Tipperary (18)	1-18 - 1-17	Galway	Pearse Stadium	All-Ireland qualifier
24.	31 July 2005	Galway (6)	2-20 - 2-18	Tipperary	Croke Park	All-Ireland quarter-final
25.	25 July 2010	Tipperary (19)	3-17 - 3-16	Galway	Croke Park	All-Ireland quarter-final
26.	5 July 2014	Tipperary (20)	3-25 - 4-13	Galway	Semple Stadium	All-Ireland qualifier
27.	16 August 2015	Galway (7)	0-26 - 3-16	Tipperary	Croke Park	All-Ireland semi-final
28.	14 August 2016	Tipperary (21)	2-19 - 2-18	Galway	Croke Park	All-Ireland semi-final
29.	6 August 2017	Galway (8)	0-22 - 1-18	Tipperary	Croke Park	All-Ireland semi-final
30.	21 November 2020	Galway (9)	3-23 - 2-24	Tipperary	Gaelic Grounds	All-Ireland quarter-final
31.	24 June 2023	Galway (10)	1-20 - 1-18	Tipperary	Gaelic Grounds	All-Ireland quarter-final
32.	21 June 2025	Tipperary (22)	1-28 - 2-17	Tipperary	Gaelic Grounds	All-Ireland quarter-final

=== Intermediate ===
No.	Date	Winners	Score	Runners-up	Venue	Stage
1.	3 May 1964	Galway (1)	1-08 - 1-03	Tipperary	Pearse Stadium	Munster quarter-final
2.	10 July 1966	Tipperary (1)	4-02 - 1-07	Galway	Dunlo Grounds	Munster final
3.	17 September 1972	Tipperary (2)	2-13 - 1-09	Galway	St. Brendan's Park	All-Ireland final
4.	30 August 2000	Tipperary (3)	2-17 - 1-10	Galway	Gaelic Grounds	All-Ireland final
5.	31 August 2002	Tipperary	1-20 - 2-17	Galway	St. Brendan's Park	All-Ireland final
6.	21 September 2002	Galway (2)	2-15 - 1-10	Tipperary	St. Brendan's Park	All-Ireland final replay

=== Junior ===
No.	Date	Winners	Score	Runners-up	Venue	Stage
1.	19 October 1913	Tipperary (1)	11-02 - 0-02	Galway	Croke Park	All-Ireland semi-final
2.	26 March 1916	Tipperary (2)	11-04 - 0-03	Galway	Markets Field	All-Ireland semi-final
3.	30 August 1925	Tipperary (3)	5-05 - 1-02	Galway	Croke Park	All-Ireland final
4.	30 March 1927	Tipperary (4)	6-02 - 2-03	Galway	Thurles Sportsfield	All-Ireland final
5.	8 October 1933	Tipperary (5)	8-03 - 1-03	Galway	Portumna Sportsfield	All-Ireland home final
6.	23 August 1953	Tipperary	3-05 - 3-05	Galway	Dunlo Grounds	All-Ireland semi-final
7.	30 August 1953	Tipperary (6)	6-08 - 2-04	Galway	St. Brendan's Park	All-Ireland semi-final replay
8.	3 July 1988	Tipperary (7)	3-10 - 3-09	Galway	Páirc Shíleáin	All-Ireland semi-final
9.	21 July 1989	Tipperary (8)	0-12 - 0-08	Galway	Gaelic Grounds	All-Ireland final

=== Under-21 ===
No.	Date	Winners	Score	Runners-up	Venue	Stage
1.	18 July 1965	Tipperary (1)	4-09 - 3-03	Galway	Dunlo Grounds	Munster final
2.	16 July 1967	Tipperary (2)	3-09 - 3-05	Galway	Gaelic Grounds	Munster final
3.	15 August 1972	Galway (1)	2-11 - 1-11	Tipperary	MacDonagh Park	All-Ireland semi-final
4.	8 October 1978	Galway	3-05 - 2-08	Tipperary	Gaelic Grounds	All-Ireland final
5.	29 October 1978	Galway (2)	3-15 - 2-08	Tipperary	Gaelic Grounds	All-Ireland final replay
6.	23 September 1979	Tipperary (3)	2-12 - 1-09	Galway	O'Moore Park	All-Ireland final
7.	17 August 1980	Tipperary (4)	3-11 - 2-12	Galway	Cusack Park	All-Ireland semi-final
8.	23 August 1981	Tipperary (5)	3-17 - 0-07	Galway	Cusack Park	All-Ireland semi-final
9.	11 September 1983	Galway (3)	0-12 - 0-06	Tipperary	O'Connor Park	All-Ireland final
10.	12 August 1984	Tipperary (6)	3-10 - 2-08	Galway	Cusack Park	All-Ireland semi-final
11.	11 August 1985	Tipperary (7)	1-15 - 2-07	Galway	O'Connor Park	All-Ireland semi-final
12.	13 August 1989	Tipperary (8)	1-14 - 1-07	Galway	Gaelic Grounds	All-Ireland semi-final
13.	12 August 1999	Galway (4)	3-12 - 1-16	Tipperary	O'Connor Park	All-Ireland semi-final
14.	23 August 2003	Galway (5)	2-20 - 2-16	Tipperary	Cusack Park	All-Ireland semi-final
15.	11 September 2010	Tipperary (9)	5-22 - 0-12	Galway	Semple Stadium	All-Ireland final

=== Minor ===
No.	Date	Winners	Score	Runners-up	Venue	Stage
1.	14 August 1932	Tipperary (1)	6-06 - 0-00	Galway	Gaelic Grounds	All-Ireland semi-final
2.	8 October 1933	Tipperary (2)	4-06 - 2-03	Galway	Walsh Park	All-Ireland final
3.	5 August 1934	Tipperary (3)	8-8 - 1-00	Galway	St. Cronan's Park	All-Ireland semi-final
4.	29 July 1945	Tipperary (4)	5-16 - 0-02	Galway	St. Brendan's Park	All-Ireland semi-final
5.	28 July 1946	Tipperary (5)	5-06 - 0-01	Galway	St. Brendan's Park	All-Ireland semi-final
6.	7 September 1947	Tipperary (6)	9-05 - 1-05	Galway	Croke Park	All-Ireland final
7.	13 August 1950	Tipperary (7)	6-09 - 0-05	Galway	Tuam Stadium	All-Ireland semi-final
8.	27 July 1952	Tipperary (8)	9-03 - 0-01	Galway		All-Ireland semi-final
9.	15 August 1954	Tipperary (9)	10-12 - 1-02	Galway	Croke Park	All-Ireland semi-final
10.	4 September 1955	Tipperary (10)	5-15 - 2-05	Galway	Croke Park	All-Ireland final
11.	28 July 1957	Tipperary (11)	4-12 - 3-07	Galway	Croke Park	All-Ireland semi-final
12.	31 July 1960	Tipperary (12)	6-07 - 4-03	Galway	Thurles Sportsfield	Munster final
13.	27 May 1965	Tipperary (13)	5-08 - 3-09	Galway	Gaelic Grounds	Munster semi-final
14.	10 July 1966	Galway (1)	5-05 - 3-06	Tipperary	Dunlo Grounds	Munster semi-final
15.	15 August 1973	Galway (2)	3-14 - 3-10	Tipperary	Cusack Park	All-Ireland semi-final
16.	5 September 1982	Tipperary (14)	2-07 - 0-04	Galway	Croke Park	All-Ireland final
17.	7 August 1983	Tipperary	3-10 - 3-10	Galway	Croke Park	All-Ireland final
18.	21 August 1973	Galway (3)	1-07 - 0-08	Tipperary	Cusack Park	All-Ireland semi-final replay
19.	9 August 1987	Tipperary (15)	4-12 - 1-09	Galway	Croke Park	All-Ireland semi-final
20.	4 August 1991	Tipperary (16)	2-15 - 1-13	Galway	Croke Park	All-Ireland semi-final
21.	6 August 1993	Galway (4)	3-10 - 0-10	Tipperary	Cusack Park	All-Ireland semi-final
22.	1 September 1996	Galway	3-11 - 0-20	Tipperary	Croke Park	All-Ireland final
23.	29 September 1993	Tipperary (17)	2-14 - 2-12	Galway	Croke Park	All-Ireland final replay
24.	17 August 1997	Galway (5)	2-09 - 0-14	Tipperary	Croke Park	All-Ireland semi-final
25.	12 September 1999	Galway (6)	0-13 - 0-10	Tipperary	Croke Park	All-Ireland final
26.	12 August 2001	Galway (7)	3-13 - 1-07	Tipperary	Croke Park	All-Ireland semi-final
27.	10 August 2003	Galway (8)	2-19 - 2-16	Tipperary	Croke Park	All-Ireland semi-final
28.	3 September 2006	Tipperary (18)	2-18 - 2-07	Galway	Croke Park	All-Ireland final
29.	19 August 2012	Tipperary (19)	2-16 - 1-14	Galway	Croke Park	All-Ireland semi-final
30.	6 September 2015	Galway (9)	4-13 - 1-16	Tipperary	Croke Park	All-Ireland final
31.	14 August 2016	Tipperary (20)	7-12 - 2-12	Galway	Croke Park	All-Ireland semi-final

== See also ==
- Galway GAA
- Tipperary GAA
- Connacht Senior Hurling Championship
- Munster Senior Hurling Championship
- All-Ireland Senior Hurling Championship
