= Liam Donnelly (hurler) =

Hurler from Dublin, Ireland (1928-2017)

Personal information
- Native name: Liam Ó Donnaile (Irish)
- Nickname: Liam
- Born: 1928 Raheny, Dublin, Ireland
- Died: 5 January 2017 (aged 88–89)
- Occupation: Army officer

Sport
- Sport: Hurling
- Position: Centre-back
Club
- Years: Club
- 1940s–1950s: St Vincents
Inter-county
Years	County	Apps (scores)
1948–1953	Dublin	7 (0-5)
Inter-county titles
- Leinster titles: 1

William "Liam" Donnelly (1928– 5 January 2017) was an Irish former hurler who played as a centre-back for the Dublin senior team.

Raised in Raheny, Dublin, Donnelly played both hurling and Gaelic football with his local club, St Vincents. As a minor, he scored the winning goal against Tipperary in the 1946 All-Ireland Minor Hurling Championship final. He won a Leinster Senior Hurling Championship with the Dublin senior team in 1948 and featured in the 1948 All-Ireland final, which they lost to Waterford.

Outside of sport, Donnelly served as an officer in the Irish Army, and was "third in command" (Support Platoon Commander) of A Company during the Siege of Jadotville in 1961.

== Honours ==
=== Dublin ===
- All-Ireland Senior Hurling Championship

Runner-up (1): 1948

- Leinster Senior Hurling Championship

Winner (1): 1948

- All-Ireland Minor Hurling Championship

Winner (2): 1945, 1946

- Leinster Minor Hurling Championship

Winner (2): 1945, 1946

- All-Ireland Minor Football Championship

Winner (1): 1945

- Leinster Minor Football Championship

Winner (2): 1945, 1946
