= John Doyle (Tipperary hurler) =

Irish hurler and politician (1930–2010)

Senator
- In office 5 November 1969 – 1 June 1973
- Constituency: Agricultural Panel

Personal details
- Born: 12 February 1930 Holycross, County Tipperary, Ireland
- Died: 29 December 2010 (aged 80) Thurles, County Tipperary, Ireland
- Party: Fianna Fáil
- Spouse: Anne Reidy (m. 1955)
- Children: 7, including Michael.

John Doyle
Personal information
- Nickname: The Legend
- Height: 6 ft 2 in (188 cm)

Sport
- Sport: Hurling
- Position: Left corner-back
Club
- Years: Club
- 1947–1968: Holycross–Ballycahill
Club titles
- Tipperary titles: 3
Inter-county*
Years	County	Apps (scores)
1948–1967	Tipperary	54 (0–00)
Inter-county titles
- Munster titles: 10
- All-Irelands: 8
- NHL: 11
- *Inter County team apps and scores correct as of 10 July 2013.

John Doyle (12 February 1930 – 29 December 2010) was an Irish hurler who played as a left corner-back at senior level for the Tipperary county team.

Born in Holycross, County Tipperary, Doyle first played competitive hurling whilst at school in Thurles CBS. He arrived on the inter-county scene at the age of sixteen when he first linked up with the Tipperary minor team. He made his senior debut in the 1947-48 National League. Doyle went on to play a key part for Tipperary during a hugely successful era for the team, and won eight All-Ireland medals, ten Munster medals and eleven National Hurling League medals.

As a member of the Munster inter-provincial team for fifteen years, Doyle won six Railway Cup medals. At club level, he won three championship medals with Holycross–Ballycahill.

For almost fifty years Doyle, together with Christy Ring, held a unique record as the only players to win eight All-Ireland medals on the field of play. This record was subsequently surpassed by Henry Shefflin. His record of National League medals has yet to be equalled.

Throughout his career Doyle made 54 championship appearances, a Tipperary record which stood until 9 August 2009 when it was surpassed by Brendan Cummins. His retirement came following Tipperary's defeat by Kilkenny in the 1967 championship.

Doyle is widely regarded as one of the greatest hurlers in the history of the game. During his playing days, he won two Cú Chulainn awards, as well as being named Texaco Hurler of the Year in 1964. He has been repeatedly voted onto teams made up of the sport's greats, including at left corner-back on the Hurling Team of the Century in 1984 and the Hurling Team of the Millennium in 2000. He was a Fianna Fáil senator from 1969 to 1973.

== Playing career ==
=== Colleges ===
Doyle's hurling skills were honed during his schooling at Thurles CBS. Regarded as too good for CBS Primary School team, he was drafted into the secondary school's under-15 Croke Cup team in 1942. Doyle played at wing-forward as Thurles CBS won the championship that year.

=== Club ===
Doyle played his club hurling with Holycross–Ballycahill and his career spanned three decades. He made his senior championship debut in 1947.

In 1948 he played in his first championship decider with Lorrha providing the opposition. Doyle was singled out for particular praise while Philip Maher at centre-forward had the game of his life. After leading at half-time, Holycross took complete control in the second half and powered to a 4–10 to 2–4 victory. It was Doyle's first championship medal.

After failing to reach the same heights over the following two seasons, Holycross–Ballycahill reached the championship decider again in 1951. Clonoulty–Rossmore provided little opposition and Doyle collected a second championship medal following a 5–15 to 1-4 trouncing.

Doyle's team failed to retain their title once again, and it was 1954 before the team reached another championship decider. A comprehensive 6–5 to 2–3 defeat of Roscrea gave Doyle his third and final championship medal.

=== Minor ===
After having his presence requested for trials for the Tipperary minor team in May 1946, Doyle was an automatic choice at corner-back for the subsequent championship campaign. A 5–6 to 4–2 defeat of Cork in the provincial decider gave him his first Munster medal. The subsequent All-Ireland decider pitted Tipperary against Dublin for the second year in succession. Tipp looked destined for victory when, with just a minute left to play, Paddy Kenny sent over a free to give the team a one-point lead. The resultant puck-out posed an immediate goal threat. After being shouldered in the chest, Doyle ended up in the goal's rigging and Dublin scored to secure a narrow 1–6 to 0–7 victory.

Tipperary retained their provincial crown in 1947, with Doyle collecting a second Munster medal following a 2–4 to 1–2 defeat of Waterford. He later lined out in a second All-Ireland decider, however, Galway provided little opposition. A 9–5 to 1-5 trouncing gave Doyle an All-Ireland Minor Hurling Championship medal.

In 1948 Doyle was a senior figure with the Tipperary minor team and was appointed captain for the year. After huge victories over Limerick and Cork, Doyle's side were the red-hot favourites for the Munster crown. A remarkable 3–6 to 0–3 defeat by Waterford was the result, in what was Doyle's final game in the minor grade.

=== Senior ===
==== Three-in-a-row ====
Doyle made his senior debut in a National Hurling League defeat of Kilkenny in February 1948. Although still a minor, his appearance was brief and he was later released from the senior panel.

On 26 June 1949 Doyle made his senior championship debut in a Munster quarter-final replay against Cork. He impressed in that extra-time victory and was retained for the semi-final defeat of Clare, during which he had a mixed game. Doyle was dropped for the subsequent Munster decider against Limerick, however, on the day of the game he was a late addition to the starting fifteen. After trailing at the interval, Tipp eventually triumphed by 1–16 to 2–10, giving Doyle his first Munster medal. On 4 September 1949, Tipperary and Laois faced off in the All-Ireland decider and Doyle was playing at left corner-back. In a one-sided affair, Tipp completely overpowered the Leinster champions on a score line of 3–11 to 0–3, giving Doyle his first All-Ireland medal.

Tipperary retained their provincial crown in 1950. A hard-fought 2–17 to 3–11 defeat of Cork in a tense game gave Doyle his second Munster medal. He later lined out in his second successive All-Ireland final on 3 September 1950, with age-old rivals Kilkenny providing the opposition. In a dull affair, Tipp looked to be heading for victory when Seán Kenny scored a goal to put the team four points ahead with just one minute left to play. Kilkenny fought back and a Jimmy Kelly goal from the puck-out reduced the deficit to just one point again. As "the Cats" were about to launch one final attack, the referee blew the whistle and Tipperary had won by 1–9 to 1–8. Doyle gave one of his best-ever All-Ireland displays as he collected his second All-Ireland medal. He rounded off the year by winning a National League medal following a 1–12 to 3–4 defeat of New York.

Tipperary's dominance of the provincial championship continued in 1951, with Doyle lining out against Cork in a third successive Munster decider. Cork's Christy Ring gave one of his best displays, however, the Tipperary full-back line of Doyle, Tony Brennan and Mickey "the Rattler" Byrne also gave a defiant performance. A 2–11 to 2–9 victory gave Doyle a third Munster medal. The subsequent All-Ireland decider against Wexford on 2 September 1951 provided Tipperary with the chance to secure a hat-trick of championship titles for the first time in over half a century. Nicky Rackard, Wexford's goal-scoring machine, was nullified by Tipp goalkeeper Tony Reddin, while Séamus Bannon, Tim Ryan and Paddy Kenny scored key goals which powered Tipp to a 7–7 to 3–9 victory. It was Doyle's third All-Ireland medal.

==== Fallow period ====
Doyle won a second National League medal in 1952, as New York were bested on a 6–14 to 2–5 score line. The dream of a fourth successive All-Ireland triumph came to an end when Cork defeated Tipp in the provincial decider.

Tipperary went into a period of decline following this, as Cork and Wexford had a stranglehold on the All-Ireland crown. In spite of this, Doyle added three more National League medals to his collection following defeats of Kilkenny in 1954, Wexford in 1955 and Kilkenny again in 1957.

==== A fourth All-Ireland ====
In 1958 Doyle won a fourth Munster medal as Tipperary regained the provincial crown following a 4–12 to 1-5 trouncing of reigning champions Waterford. It was Wall's first provincial medal at senior level. Tipp later defeated Kilkenny in the All-Ireland semi-final before lining out against Galway in the All-Ireland decider on 7 September 1958. Galway got a bye into the final without picking up a hurley. Liam Devaney, Donie Nealon and Larry Keane all scored goals for Tipperary in the first-half, while Tony Wall sent a seventy-yard free untouched to the Galway net. Tipp won the game by 4–9 to 2-5 giving Doyle his fourth All-Ireland medal.

Doyle won a sixth National League medal in 1959 following a 0–15 to 0–7 defeat of Waterford, however, Tipperary subsequently surrendered their provincial and All-Ireland crowns.

Tipperary asserted their dominance in 1960 by retaining the National League title with a 2–15 to 3–8 defeat of Cork. It was Doyle's seventh winners' medal in that competition. He later won a fifth Munster medal following a narrow 4–13 to 4–11 defeat of Cork in what has been described as the toughest game of hurling ever played. This victory allowed Tipperary to advance directly to an All-Ireland final meeting with Wexford on 4 September 1960. A certain amount of over-confidence was obvious in the Tipperary camp, particularly in trainer Phil Purcell's comment that no player was capable of marking Jimmy Doyle. The game ended in remarkable circumstances as the crowd invaded the pitch with a minute to go, mistaking the referee's whistle for the end of the game. When the crowd were finally moved off the pitch Tipperary continued playing with only twelve men, but Wexford won on a score line of 2–15 to 0–11. It was Doyle's first All-Ireland defeat.

==== Total dominance ====
1961 saw Doyle collect an eighth National League medal following a 6–6 to 4–9 defeat of Waterford. He later added a sixth Munster medal to his collection, as old rivals Cork were downed by 3–6 to 0–7. The absence of the All-Ireland semi-final allowed Tipperary to advance directly to the final itself, with Dublin's first native hurling team providing the opposition on 3 September 1961. The game was a close run thing, however, Tipp held on to win by 0–16 to 1–12. It was Doyle's fifth All-Ireland medal.

In 1962 Tipperary were still the kingpins of Munster. A 5–14 to 2-3 trouncing of Waterford in the decider gave Doyle a seventh Munster medal. Tipperary's nemesis of two years earlier, Wexford, waited in Croke Park to test them once again in the subsequent All-Ireland final on 2 September 1962. Wexford, however, were not the force of old and the side got off to possibly the worst start ever by a team in a championship decider. After just ninety seconds the Leinster champions were down by two goals, however, the game turned out to be much closer than people expected. Tipp eventually secured the win on a score line of 3–10 to 2–11, giving Doyle a sixth All-Ireland medal, a record haul for a Tipperary player.

After losing the following year's Munster final to Waterford in one of the hurling shocks of the decade, Tipperary bounced back in 1964 with Doyle collecting a ninth National League medal. Tipperary later cantered casually past Cork by fourteen points in the provincial decider, giving Doyle a record-equalling ninth Munster medal. The All-Ireland final on 6 September 1964 saw Kilkenny enter the game as firm favourites against Doyle's side. John "Mackey" McKenna scored Tipp's first goal after ten minutes as the Munster champions took a 1–8 to 0-6 interval lead. The second half saw Tipperary score goals for fun, with Donie Nealon getting a hat-trick and Seán McLoughlin another. Kilkenny were humiliated at the full-time whistle as Tipperary triumphed by 5–13 to 2–8. It was Doyle's seventh All-Ireland medal.

In 1965 Doyle won a tenth and final National League medal as New York were narrowly defeated on an aggregate score of 6–19 to 5-20. Tipperary demolished all opposition in the provincial championship once again and a 4–11 to 0-5 trouncing of Cork gave Doyle a record-breaking tenth Munster medal. Wexford were Tipp's opponents in the subsequent All-Ireland final on 5 September 1965, however, the game failed to live up to the two classic games between the two sides in 1960 and 1962. Victory went to Tipperary on that occasion by 2–16 to 0–10, courtesy of a brace of goals by Seán McLoughlin. The win gave Doyle a record-equalling eight All-Ireland medals.

==== Decline ====
After surrendering their provincial crown in 1966, Tipperary bounced back the following year, with Doyle winning a record tenth Munster medal following a 4–12 to 2–6 defeat of Clare. 3 September 1967 saw Kilkenny face Tipperary in the All-Ireland decider, and the game presented Doyle win the chance of making history by winning a record-breaking ninth All-Ireland medal. Tipp looked like continuing their hoodoo over their near rivals as they took a 2–6 to 1–3 lead at half-time. Goalkeeper Ollie Walsh was the hero for Kilkenny as he made a series of spectacular saves, however, the team lost Eddie Keher and Tom Walsh to injury in the second half. In spite of this, Kilkenny laid to rest a bogey that Tipperary had over the team since 1922, and a 3–8 to 2–7 victory resulted in defeat for Doyle's team. The defeat brought the curtain down on Doyle's inter-county career.

== Sporting retirement ==
In retirement from inter-county hurling, Doyle continued to work on his farm in Holycross. His status as one of the greatest players of all-time was further enhanced in 1984 and again in 2000 when he was named on the Gaelic Athletic Association's Hurling Team of the Century and the Hurling Team of the Millennium.

== Political career ==
In later years he entered politics. He stood unsuccessfully as a Fianna Fáil candidate at the 1969 general election for the Tipperary North constituency, but was subsequently elected to Seanad Éireann on the Agricultural Panel. He served until 1973 when he lost his seat.

== Recognition ==
A tall player with a long stride, Doyle played at corner-back and was known for his defensive play, in particular for making long clearances from congested positions. He made frequent use of the shoulder-to-shoulder charge and cleared the ball out of defence more often than was typical for the position. With fellow inner-defenders Michael Maher and Kieran Carey, he formed Tipperary's full-back line for a ten-year period from the late 1950s. The area they defended in front of goal became known as "Hell's Kitchen", a reference to the robust nature of the exchanges that followed high balls delivered from midfield.

Gaelic games journalist Paddy Downey wrote of Doyle on the occasion of his record-equalling eighth All-Ireland medal in 1965: "If anyone is hurling deserved to join Ring on the magical pinnacle of fame, that man is John Doyle of Holycross...For seventeen years, and to this day, they have had John Doyle, who more than any other player of this generation, personifies that traditional image of Tipperary hurling and hurling men."

Clare hurling legend Jimmy Smyth wrote: "He embodied Tipperary hurling really. Tipperary had three great hurlers by the name of Doyle - you had Tommy, Jimmy, John. But if anyone spoke about 'Doyle' they weren't talking about Tommy or Jimmy, they were talking about John. When your name is reduced to either just your first or second name in the popular vernacular, then you're really something."

Eddie Keher, a contemporary hurler from Kilkenny and one of the greatest of all time, said: "John Doyle was an icon of the game. He's a true legend."

Seventeen years after his retirement from playing, Doyle received the ultimate honour during the GAA's centenary year in 1984 when he was chosen at left corner-back on the Hurling Team of the Century. He swapped to the right corner-back position on the Hurling Team of the Millennium in 2000, while he was also named on special Munster and Tipperary all-time teams.

== Personal life ==
Born in Holycross, County Tipperary on 12 February 1930, Doyle was the first child born to Tim and Margaret Doyle. Six weeks later his mother died from purpureal fever, leaving the young Doyle to be raised by his forty-two-year-old father. After a year Doyle was sent to Dungarvan, County Waterford where he was raised by his aunt. On returning home to Holycross, Doyle was enrolled in the Sacred Heart College for Little Boys in Thurles, a boarding school for young boys who had lost their mothers. After a year spent here, he began his formal education at Gaile National School. As an eleven-year-old Doyle was sent to Thurles CBS where he finished his primary education and received a limited secondary education.

At the age of fourteen, Doyle was forced to leave school and begin work on the family farm. Together they worked the land until December 1953 when Doyle's father died after a year-long battle with stomach cancer.

On 1 October 1955 Doyle married Anne Reidy at the Church of the Seven Wells near Sixmilebridge, County Clare. The couple had seven children including Michael.

John Doyle died on 29 December 2010.

== Honours ==
=== Team ===
Thurles CBS

- Croke Cup under-15: 1942

Holycross–Ballycahill

- Tipperary Senior Hurling Championship (3): 1948, 1951, 1954

Tipperary

- All-Ireland Senior Hurling Championship (8): 1949, 1950, 1951, 1958, 1961, 1962, 1964, 1965
- Munster Senior Hurling Championship (10): 1949, 1950, 1951, 1958, 1960, 1961, 1962, 1964, 1965, 1967
- National Hurling League (10): 1949-50, 1951–52, 1953–54, 1954–55 (c), 1956–57, 1958–59, 1959–60, 1960–61, 1963–64, 1964–65
- Oireachtas Cup (6): 1949, 1960, 1961, 1963, 1964, 1965
- All-Ireland Minor Hurling Championship (1): 1947
- Munster Minor Hurling Championship (2): 1946, 1947

Munster

- Railway Cup (6): 1951, 1952, 1953, 1955, 1960, 1961 (sub), 1963, 1966 (sub)

=== Individual ===
Honours

- Hurling Team of the Millennium: Right corner-back
- Hurling Team of the Century: Left corner-back
- Munster Hurling Team of the Millennium: Right corner-back
- Tipperary Hurling Team of the Century: Left corner-back
- The 125 greatest stars of the GAA: No. 13
- Texaco Hall of Fame Award: 1992
- Texaco Hurler of the Year: 1964
- Cú Chulainn Awards (2): 1963, 1964
- GAA Hall of Fame Inductee: 2013

== Bibliography ==
- Brendan Fullam (1991), Giants of the Ash
- Séamus J King (1996), A History of Hurling

Sporting positions
Preceded by Jimmy Finn	Tipperary Senior Hurling Captain; 1955	Succeeded by Mickey 'Rattler' Byrne
Awards
Preceded by Séamus Cleere (Kilkenny)	Texaco Hurler of the Year; 1964	Succeeded by Jimmy Doyle (Tipperary)
