= Michael Maher (hurler) =

Irish hurler and Gaelic games administrator

Personal information
- Native name: Mícheál Ó Meachair (Irish)
- Born: 1930 Holycross, County Tipperary, Ireland
- Died: 8 March 2017 (aged 87) Thurles, County Tipperary, Ireland
- Occupation: Agricultural officer
- Height: 6 ft 0 in (183 cm)

Sport
- Sport: Hurling
- Position: Full-back
Club
- Years: Club
- Holycross–Ballycahill
Club titles
- Tipperary titles: 3
Inter-county*
Years	County	Apps (scores)
1951–1966	Tipperary	30 (0–00)
Inter-county titles
- Munster titles: 6
- All-Irelands: 5
- NHL: 8
- *Inter County team apps and scores correct as of 17:34, 9 March 2017.

Michael Maher (1930 – 8 March 2017) was an Irish hurler and Gaelic games administrator. His league and championship career with the Tipperary senior team spanned fifteen seasons from 1951 to 1966.

Born in Holycross, County Tipperary, Maher was born into a strong hurling family. His uncle, Mikey Maher, was a five-time All-Ireland medal winner with Tipperary between 1895 and 1900, while his cousin, Sonny Maher, won three successive All-Ireland medals between 1949 and 1951.

Maher played competitive hurling during his secondary education at Thurles CBS. He later joined the Holycross–Ballycahill team, winning his first senior county championship medal as an eighteen-year-old in 1948. Maher added two more championship medals to his collection in 1951 and 1954.

Maher made his debut on the inter-county scene at the age of sixteen when he was selected for the Tipperary minor team. He enjoyed two championship seasons with the minor team, winning an All-Ireland medal in his debut season in 1947. He made his senior debut during the 1951-52 league. Over the course of the next fifteen seasons, Maher won five All-Ireland medals, beginning with a lone triumph in 1958, back-to-back championships in 1961 and 1962 and another two championships in-a-row in 1964 and 1965. He also won six Munster medals and eight National Hurling League medals. He played his last game for Tipperary in June 1966.

After being chosen on the Munster inter-provincial team for the first time in 1958, Maher was an automatic choice on the starting fifteen for the following few years. During that time he won four Railway Cup medals.

== Playing career ==
=== Club ===
Maher played his club hurling with Holycross–Ballycahill and enjoyed much success in a career that spanned three decades.

In 1948 he played in his first championship decider with Lorrha providing the opposition. Corner-back John Doyle was singled out for particular praise while Philip Maher at centre-forward had the game of his life. After leading at half-time, Holycross took complete control in the second half and powered to a 4-10 to 2-4 victory. It was Maher's first championship medal.

After failing to reach the same heights over the following two seasons, Holycross-Ballycahill reached the championship decider again in 1951. Clonoulty–Rossmore provided little opposition and Maher collected a second championship medal following a 5-15 to 1-4 trouncing.

Maher's team failed to retain their title once again, and it was 1954 before the team reached another championship decider. A comprehensive 6-5 to 2-3 defeat of Roscrea gave Maher his third and final championship medal.

=== Inter-county ===
==== Minor ====
Maher first lined out for Tipperary in the minor grade in 1947. After missing the team's provincial final triumph over Waterford, he again started the subsequent All-Ireland decider against Galway as a substitute. Maher was introduced to the field of play midway through the match and collected an All-Ireland Minor Hurling Championship medal following a 9-5 to 1-5 trouncing.

==== Senior ====
===== Beginnings =====
Maher joined the Tipperary senior panel during the 1951-52 league campaign. He won his first National Hurling League medal that year as New York were bested on a 6-14 to 2-5 score line.

Over the next few years Maher became a regular member of the Tipperary team for league games, however, he had yet to enjoy a run in the championship. In spite of this, he added two more National League medals to his collection following defeats of Wexford in 1955 and Kilkenny in 1957. By this stage Maher had made his senior championship debut on 1 July 1956 in a 2-7 to 1-11 Munster semi-final defeat by Cork.

===== First All-Ireland =====
In 1958 Maher won his first Munster medal following a 4-12 to 1-5 trouncing of reigning champions Waterford. Tipp later defeated Kilkenny in the All-Ireland semi-final before lining out against Galway in the All-Ireland decider on 7 September 1958. Galway got a bye into the final without picking up a hurley. Liam Devaney, Donie Nealon and Larry Keane all scored goals for Tipperary in the first-half, while Tony Wall sent a seventy-yard free untouched to the Galway net. Tipperary won the game by 4-9 to 2-5 giving Maher his first All-Ireland medal.

Maher won his fourth National League medal in 1959 following a 0-15 to 0-7 defeat of Waterford, however, Tipperary subsequently surrendered their provincial and All-Ireland crowns.

Tipperary asserted their dominance in 1960 by retaining the National League title with a 2-15 to 3-8 defeat of Cork. It was Maher's fifth winners' medal in that competition. He later won a second Munster medal following a narrow 4-13 to 4-11 defeat of Cork in what has been described as the toughest game of hurling ever played. This victory allowed Tipperary to advance directly to an All-Ireland final meeting with Wexford on 4 September 1960. A certain amount of over-confidence was obvious in the Tipperary camp, particularly in trainer Phil Purcell's comment that no player was capable of marking star forward Jimmy Doyle. The game ended in remarkable circumstances as the crowd invaded the pitch with a minute to go, mistaking the referee's whistle for the end of the game. When the crowd were finally moved off the pitch Tipperary continued playing with only twelve men, but Wexford won on a score line of 2-15 to 0-11. It was Maher's first All-Ireland defeat.

===== Total dominance =====
1961 saw Maher collect a sixth National League medal following a 6-6 to 4-9 defeat of Waterford. He later added a third Munster medal to his collection, as old rivals Cork were downed by 3-6 to 0-7. The absence of the All-Ireland semi-final allowed Tipperary to advance directly to the final itself, with Dublin's first native hurling team providing the opposition on 3 September 1961. The game was a close run thing, however, Tipperary held on to win by 0-16 to 1-12. It was Maher's second All-Ireland medal.

In 1962 Tipperary were still the kingpins of Munster. A 5-14 to 2-3 trouncing of Waterford in the decider gave Maher a fourth Munster medal. Tipperary's nemesis of two years earlier, Wexford, waited in Croke Park to test them once again in the subsequent All-Ireland final on 2 September 1962. Wexford, however, were not the force of old and the side got off to possibly the worst start ever by a team in a championship decider. After just ninety seconds the Leinster champions were down by two goals, however, the game turned out to be much closer than people expected. Tipperary eventually secured the win on a score line of 3-10 to 2-11, giving Maher a third All-Ireland medal.

After losing the following year's Munster final to Waterford in one of the hurling shocks of the decade, Tipperary bounced back in 1964 with Maher collecting a seventh National League medal. Tipperary later cantered casually past Cork by fourteen points in the provincial decider, giving Maher a fifth Munster medal. The All-Ireland final on 6 September 1964 saw Kilkenny enter the game as firm favourites against Tipperary. John "Mackey" McKenna scored Tipp's first goal after ten minutes as the Munster champions took a 1-8 to 0-6 interval lead. The second half saw Tipperary score goals for fun, with Donie Nealon getting a hat-trick and Seán McLoughlin another. Kilkenny were humiliated at the full-time whistle as Tipperary triumphed by 5-13 to 2-8. It was Maher's fourth All-Ireland medal.

In 1965 Maher won an eighth and final National League medal as New York were narrowly defeated on an aggregate score of 6-19 to 5-20. Tipperary demolished all opposition in the provincial championship once again and a 4-11 to 0-5 trouncing of Cork gave Maher a sixth Munster medal. Wexford were Tipperary's opponents in the subsequent All-Ireland final on 5 September 1965, however, the game failed to live up to the two classic games between the two sides in 1960 and 1962. Victory went to Tipperary on that occasion by 2-16 to 0-10, courtesy of a brace of goals by Seán McLoughlin. The win gave Maher a fifth All-Ireland medal.

===== Retirement =====
Maher played his last game for Tipperary on 1 June 1966 in a shock 2-9 to 4-12 defeat by Limerick. After retiring as a player, Maher became the Tipperary County Board chairman and later a selector with the senior Tipperary hurling team in the 1980-81 season.

=== Inter-provincial ===
Maher was first picked for the Munster inter-provincial team in 1958. He won his first Railway Cup medal that year following a 3-7 to 3-5 final defeat of Leinster. Maher was once again included on the provincial team in 1959. A 7-11 to 2-6 trouncing of Connacht gave him a second Railway Cup medal as Munster retained their crown.

After a one-year absence Maher won his third Railway Cup medal in 1961 as Leinster were downed by 4-12 to 3-9.

He won his fourth and final Railway Cup medal in 1963 following a narrow 2-8 to 2-7 defeat of Leinster.

== Death ==
On 8 March 2017, Maher died at the age of 87 after a long illness.

== Honours ==
=== Player ===
Thurles CBS

- Dean Ryan Cup (1): 1947

Holycross–Ballycahill

- Tipperary Senior Hurling Championship (3): 1948, 1951, 1954

Tipperary

- All-Ireland Senior Hurling Championship (5): 1958, 1961, 1962, 1964, 1965
- Munster Senior Hurling Championship (6): 1958, 1960, 1961, 1962, 1964, 1965
- National Hurling League (8): 1951–52, 1954–55, 1956–57, 1958–59, 1959–60, 1960–61, 1963–64, 1964–65
- All-Ireland Minor Hurling Championship (1): 1947
- Munster Minor Hurling Championship (1): 1947 (sub)

Munster

- Railway Cup (4): 1958, 1959, 1961, 1963
