= Michael Doyle (hurler) =

Tipperary hurler and manager

Personal information
- Native name: Mícheál Ó Dúil (Irish)
- Born: 1958 (age 67–68) Holycross, County Tipperary, Ireland
- Occupation: Sales manager

Sport
- Sport: Hurling
- Position: Centre-forward
Club
- Years: Club
- Holycross–Ballycahill
Club titles
- Tipperary titles: 1
Inter-county*
Years	County	Apps (scores)
1976–1987	Tipperary	14 (4–4)
Inter-county titles
- Munster titles: 1
- All-Irelands: 0
- NHL: 1
- All Stars: 0
- *Inter County team apps and scores correct as of 15:23, 26 December 2014.

Michael Doyle (born 1958) is an Irish former hurler who played as a centre-forward at senior level for the Tipperary county team

Born in Holycross, County Tipperary, Doyle first played competitive hurling whilst at school in Thurles CBS. He arrived on the inter-county scene at the age of seventeen when he first linked up with the Tipperary minor team, before later joining the under-21 team. He joined the senior panel during the 1976 championship. Doyle went on to play a key part for Tipperary during a largely barren era for the team, and won one Munster medal and one National Hurling League medal.

At club level Doyle is a one-time championship medallist with Holycross–Ballycahill.

His father, John Doyle, was an eight-time All-Ireland medallist with Tipperary and is regarded as one of the greatest player of all-time. His uncle, Ray Reidy, was also an All-Ireland medallist with Tipperary, while his brother, Johnny Doyle also played for Tipperary.

Throughout his career Doyle made 14 championship appearances. His retirement came following the conclusion of the 1987 championship.

In retirement from playing Doyle became involved in team management, coaching and refereeing. He served as a selector and as manager of the Tipperary under-21 and senior teams, as well as a host of club sides.

== Playing career ==
=== Club ===
In 1990 Doyle was at centre-back as Holycross–Ballycahill reached a second successive championship decider. Cashel King Cormacs provided the opposition in a closely contested affair in which defences dominated. Holycross led by two points at the interval and eventually won the game by 0–13 to 0–10, giving Doyle a Tipperary Senior Hurling Championship medal.

=== Minor and under-21 ===
Doyle first came to prominence on the inter-county scene as a member of the Tipperary minor hurling team during their unsuccessful championship campaign in 1975. He was eligible for the grade once again in 1976, and collected a Munster medal following a 5–10 to 5–6 defeat of Limerick. The subsequent All-Ireland decider pitted Kilkenny against Tipperary. Doyle's side had a relatively easy victory, and he collected an All-Ireland medal following a 2–20 to 1–7 victory.

Two years later Doyle was a key member of the Tipperary under-21 team. He collected his first Munster medal that year following a 3–8 to 2–9 defeat of Cork in a replay. Galway provided the opposition in the subsequent All-Ireland decider, however, the game ended in a draw. At the second time of asking Galway emerged victorious by 3–15 to 2–8.

In 1979 Doyle was appointed captain of the Tipperary under-21 team. A 1–13 to 2–7 defeat of Cork gave him a second Munster medal, before later lining out in a second successive All-Ireland decider. Galway were the opponents once again, however, Tipp made no mistake on this occasion and recorded a 2–12 to 1–9 victory. Not only did Doyle collect an All-Ireland Under-21 Hurling Championship medal, but he also had the honour of collecting the cup as captain.

=== Senior ===
Doyle joined the senior team in 1976, making his championship debut on 5 June 1977 in a 0–13 to 1–10 Munster semi-final draw with Clare.

Over the next few years Doyle was on and off the team, however, he picked up his first silverware in 1979. A 3–15 to 0–8 trouncing of Galway gave Doyle a National Hurling League medal.

In 1987 Doyle was in the twilight of his career and was a peripheral member of the team once again. After playing no part in Tipp's 1–18 apiece Munster final draw with Cork, he was introduced as a late substitute in the replay. Doyle bagged two extra-time goals while Donie O'Connell brought Tipp's tally to four to secure a 4–22 to 1–22 victory. The win gave Doyle a Munster medal.

== Managerial career ==
=== Club ===
After his retirement from club hurling, he assisted The Harps club Durrow, and later Galmoy. In Tipperary he has been associated with Mullinahone on their way to their first South senior title in the early nineties, Arravale Rovers, and in recent years Nenagh Éire Óg.

=== Inter-county ===
Doyle first became involved in team management in 1994 when he linked up as a selector with the Tipperary minor football team.

In 1995 Doyle took charge of the Tipperary under-21 team as manager. It was a successful year, as Tipp collected the Munster title following a 1–17 to 0–14 defeat of Clare. Tipp later reached the All-Ireland decider where Kilkenny, the reigning champions, were the opponents. A 1–14 to 1–10 victory gave Tipperary the title and gave Doyle the unique distinction of being an All-Ireland under-21-winning captain and manager.

Doyle remained with the Tipperary under-21 team, combining the final season of his tenure in 1997 with the position of selector with the Tipperaty senior team. That year Tipp were narrowly defeated by Clare in the provincial decider. Clare subsequently qualified for the All-Ireland decider, however, due to the introduction of the "back-door" system Tipperary provided the opposition in the first all-Munster All-Ireland final. The game itself was one of the best of the decade. Clare were well on top for much of the game, however, Liam Cahill and Eugene O'Neill scored twice for Tipp in the last ten minutes. John Leahy missed a goal chance in the last minute while another Tipp point was controversially ruled wide. At the full-time whistle Clare won by a single point by 0–20 to 2–13.

On 5 November 2002 Doyle was appointed manager of the Tipperary senior team. His one-year tenure saw Tipp being knocked out of the Munster championship by Clare at the quarter-final stage, before later facing a heavy 3–18 to 0–15 defeat by Kilkenny in the All-Ireland semi-final. Doyle subsequently lost the support of the players and resigned as manager.

== Honours ==
=== Player ===
Holycross–Ballycahill

- Tipperary Senior Hurling Championship (1): 1990
- Tipperary Under-21 Hurling Championship (1): 1978

Tipperary

- Munster Senior Hurling Championship (1): 1987
- National Hurling League (1): 1978–79
- All-Ireland Under-21 Hurling Championship (1): 1979 (c)
- Munster Under-21 Hurling Championship (2): 1978, 1979 (c)
- All-Ireland Minor Hurling Championship (1): 1976
- Munster Minor Hurling Championship (1): 1976

=== Manager ===
Tipperary

- All-Ireland Under-21 Hurling Championship (1): 1995
- Munster Under-21 Hurling Championship (2): 1995

=== Individual ===
Awards

- Tipperary Senior Hurling Championship Final man of the match (1): 1989

Achievements
Preceded by Bernie Forde (Galway)	All-Ireland Under-21 Hurling Final winning captain 1979	Succeeded by Philip Kennedy (Tipperary)
Sporting positions
Preceded by Pat Fitzelle	Tipperary Under-21 Hurling Captain; 1979	Succeeded by P. J. Maxwell
Preceded by Mick Minogue	Tipperary Under-21 Hurling Manager; 1995–1997	Succeeded by Gerry O'Brien
Preceded by Nicky English	Tipperary Senior Hurling Manager; 2002–2003	Succeeded by Ken Hogan
