= 1947 Tipperary Senior Hurling Championship =

Annual hurling competition season

- Dates: 28 September – 26 October 1947
- Teams: 4
- Champions: Carrick Swans (1st title); Willie Wall (captain)
- Runners-up: Borrisoleigh

Tournament statistics
- Matches played: 3
- Goals scored: 24 (8 per match)
- Points scored: 22 (7.33 per match)

The 1947 Tipperary Senior Hurling Championship was the 56th staging of the Tipperary Senior Hurling Championship since its establishment by the Tipperary County Board in 1887. The championship ran from 28 September to 26 October 1947.

Thurles Sarsfields were the defending champions.

The final was played on 20 October 1947 at Clonmel Sportsfield, between Carrick Swans and first-time finalists Borrisoleigh. Carrick Swans won the match by 5–04 to 2–02 to claim their first ever championship title.

== Qualification ==
Championship	Champions
Mid Tipperary Senior Hurling Championship	Holycross–Ballycahill
North Tipperary Senior Hurling Championship	Borrisoleigh
South Tipperary Senior Hurling Championship	Carrick Swans
West Tipperary Senior Hurling Championship	Knockavilla–Donaskeigh Kickhams

== Results ==
=== Semi-finals ===
28 September 1947 Semi-final	Carrick Swans	5-07 - 5-03	Holycross–Ballycahill	Leahy Park

5 October 1947 Semi-final	Borrisoleigh	4-05 - 3-01	Knockavilla Kickhams	Thurles Sportsfield

=== Final ===
26 October 1947 Final	Carrick Swans	5-04 - 2-02	Borrisoleigh	Clonmel Sportsfield
