= Cathal Barrett =

Irish hurler

Personal information
- Native name: Cathal Bairéid (Irish)
- Born: 21 July 1993 (age 33) Holycross, County Tipperary, Ireland
- Occupation: Primary school teacher
- Height: 5 ft 11 in (180 cm)

Sport
- Sport: Hurling
- Position: Right corner-back
Club
- Years: Club
- Holycross–Ballycahill
Club titles
- Tipperary titles: 0
College
- Years: College
- 2010-2016: Limerick Institute of Technology
College titles
- Fitzgibbon titles: 0
Inter-county*
Years	County	Apps (scores)
2014–present	Tipperary	24 (0-03)
Inter-county titles
- Munster titles: 2
- All-Irelands: 2
- NHL: 0
- All Stars: 2
- *Inter County team apps and scores correct as of 21:21, 18 November 2019.

Cathal Barrett (born 21 July 1993) is an Irish hurler who plays for Tipperary Championship club Holycross–Ballycahill and at inter-county level with the Tipperary senior hurling team. He usually lines out as a right corner-back.

== Playing career ==
=== Thurles CBS ===
Barrett first came to prominence as a hurler with Thurles CBS. He played in every grade before eventually joining the senior hurling team. On 26 February 2010, he lined out at right wing-back when Thurles CBS drew 1-12 apiece with Ardscoil Rís from Limerick in the Harty Cup final. Barrett retained his position on the starting fifteen for the replay on 6 March 2010 which resulted in a 4–15 to 2–21 draw. On 11 March 2010, he was at centre-back when Thurles CBS suffered a 3–15 to 0–14 defeat by Ardscoil Rís in a second replay of the final.

=== Limerick Institute of Technology ===
Barrett studied at the Limerick Institute of Technology between 2011 and 2016 and joined the senior hurling team in his second year. He was a regular player in defence in various Fitzgibbon Cup campaigns.

=== Holycross–Ballycahill ===
Barrett joined the Holycross–Ballycahill club at a young age and played in all grades at juvenile and underage levels, enjoying championship success in the minor grade. He eventually joined the club's top adult team.

=== Tipperary ===
==== Minor and under-21 ====
Barrett was just 16-years-old when he was selected for the Tipperary minor hurling team prior to the start of the 2010 Munster Championship. He made his first appearance for the team on 5 May 2010 when he lined out at right corner-back in Tipperary's 0–17 to 1–13 defeat by Clare.

Barrett was again eligible for the Tipperary minor team in 2011, however, his position changed from corner-back to left wing-back. His minor career ended with a 3–13 to 1–13 defeat by Clare on 24 June 2011.

Barrett was drafted onto the Tipperary under-21 team in advance of the 2012 Munster Championship. He was an unused substitute when Tipperary suffered a 1–16 to 1–11 defeat by Limerick on 18 July 2012. Barrett was again listed as a substitute win a 1–16 to 1–14 defeat by Clare in the Munster final on 8 August 2012.

On 31 May 2013, Barrett made his first appearance for the Tipperary under-21 team when he lined out at right corner-forward in a 2–18 to 2–11 defeat of Limerick. He was switched to left corner-back when Tipperary suffered a 1–17 to 2–10 defeat by Clare in the Munster final on 7 August 2013.

Barrett was selected for the under-21 team for a third successive season in 2014. He played his last game in the grade on 16 July 2014 when he lined out at right corner-forward in a 5–19 to 1–25 defeat by Clare.

==== Senior ====
Barrett was added to the Tipperary senior team in advance of the 2014 National League. He made his first appearance for the team on 15 February 2014 when he lined out at right corner-back in a 2–13 to 0–16 defeat of Waterford. On 4 May 2014, Barrett was again at right corner-back when Tipperary suffered a 2–25 to 1–27 defeat by Kilkenny in the National League final. He made his Munster Championship debut on 1 June 2014 when he played the full 70 minutes in a 2–18 to 2–16 defeat by Limerick. On 7 September 2014, Barrett played in his first All-Ireland final against Kilkenny. He lined out in his usual position of right corner-back in the 1–28 to 3–22 draw with Kilkenny. Barrett retained his place on the starting fifteen for the replay on 27 September 2014, however, he ended the game on the losing side following a 2-17 t 2–14 defeat. He ended the season by being named Young Hurler of the Year.

On 12 July 2015, Barrett lined out at right corner-back in his first Munster final. He ended the game with his first winners' medal following Tipperary's 0–21 to 0–16 defeat of Waterford. Barrett ended the season by receiving a second successive All-Star nomination.

On 10 July 2016, Barrett started the Munster final against Waterford at right corner-back. He collected a second successive winners' medal following the 5–19 to 0–13 victory. Barrett was again named at right corner-back for the All-Ireland final against Kilkenny on 4 September 2016. He ended the game with an All-Ireland medal following a 2–29 to 2–20 victory. Barrett ended the season by being named in the right corner-back position on the All-Star team.

On 23 April 2017, Barrett lined out at right corner-back when Tipperary suffered a 3–21 to 0–14 defeat by Galway in the National League final. On 30 May 2017, it emerged that he had been dropped from the Tipperary senior hurling panel for an "internal issue". It was later revealed that Barrett had been arrested and charged with assaulting a barman at Hayes' Hotel in Thurles on 27 May 2017, a charge he was later found guilty of.

In October 2017, it was confirmed that Barrett would return to the Tipperary senior hurling panel for the 2018 season after "clear-the-air" talks with the Tipperary management. On 8 April 2018, he was introduced as a 45th-minute substitute for Séamus Kennedy when Tipperary suffered a 2–23 to 2–17 defeat by Kilkenny in the National League final. On 20 September 2018, it emerged that Barrett had been banned from driving for two years after being convicted of being intoxicated while in charge of a car.

On 18 August 2019, Barrett was selected at right corner-back when Tipperary faced Kilkenny in the All-Ireland final. He became embroiled in one of the major talking points of the game when Richie Hogan was red-carded after a head-high tackle on Barrett. He ended the game with a second All-Ireland winners' medal following the 3–25 to 0–20 victory. Barrett ended the season by being named in the left corner-back position on the All-Star team.

In October 2024, Barrett was omitted from the Tipperary training squad ahead of the 2025 season.

== Career statistics ==
As of match played 18 August 2019.

Team	Year	National League			Munster		All-Ireland		Total	
Team	Year	Division	Apps	Score	Apps	Score	Apps	Score	Apps	Score
Tipperary	2014	Division 1A	7	0-00	1	0-00	6	0-00	14	0-00
Tipperary	2015	Division 1A	5	0-00	1	0-00	1	0-00	7	0-00
Tipperary	2016	Division 1A	6	0-01	3	0-00	2	0-00	11	0-01
Tipperary	2017	Division 1A	3	0-00	1	0-00	—		4	0-00
Tipperary	2018	Division 1A	3	0-03	2	0-01	—		5	0-04
Tipperary	2019	Division 1A	3	0-00	4	0-00	3	0-00	10	0-00
Total			27	0-04	12	0-01	12	0-00	51	0-05

== Honours ==
Tipperary

- All-Ireland Senior Hurling Championship (2): 2016, 2019
- Munster Senior Hurling Championship (2):2015, 2016
- Waterford Crystal Cup: (1): 2014

Individual

- All Stars Young Hurler of the Year: 2014
- All Star Award (2): 2016, 2019
- The Sunday Game Team of the Year (4): 2014, 2015, 2016, 2019
