= Michael O'Dwyer (hurler) =

Irish hurler

Personal information
- Native name: Mícheál Ó Dubhuir (Irish)
- Born: 27 September 1887 Holycross, County; Tipperary, Ireland
- Died: 13 February 1975 (aged 86) Navan, County Meath, Ireland
- Occupation: Roman Catholic priest

Sport
- Sport: Hurling
Club
- Years: Club
- Holycross–Ballycahill
Club titles
- Tipperary titles: 0
Inter-county
- Years: County
- 1908-1911: Tipperary
Inter-county titles
- Munster titles: 1
- All-Irelands: 1

Michael O'Dwyer, S.S.C.M.E. (27 September 1887 – 13 February 1975) was an Irish hurler who played for the Tipperary senior team.

Born in Holycross, County Tipperary, O'Dwyer was introduced to hurling in his youth. He excelled in both the academic and athletic fields at St. Patrick's College, Thurles, before later studying at Maynooth University. O'Dwyer simultaneously came to prominence with the Holycross–Ballycahill club team, with whom he enjoyed a brief career.

O'Dwyer made his debut with the Tipperary senior team during the 1908 championship. He was a regular member of the starting fifteen over the next few years and won a set of All-Ireland and Munster medals in his debut season. O'Dwyer was also included on the Tipperary team that toured Belgium as part of a pan-Celtic initiative in 1910.

O'Dwyer retired from inter-county hurling following the conclusion of the 1911 championship.

After his ordination to the priesthood in 1912, O'Dwyer completed his B.A. and D.D. and served as a professor at St. Patrick's College. In 1920 he joined the Maynooth Mission to China, eventually rising to the position of Superior General in 1924. He held this post until 1947.

At the time of his death on 13 February 1975, O'Dwyer was the last surviving member of the 1908 Tipperary All-Ireland-winning team.

== Honours ==
Tipperary

- All-Ireland Senior Hurling Championship (1): 1908
- Munster Senior Hurling Championship (1): 1908
