= Johnny Doyle (hurler) =

Irish hurler

Personal information
- Born: 1957 (age 68–69) Holycross, County Tipperary, Ireland

Sport
- Sport: Hurling
- Position: Right corner-back
Club
- Years: Club
- Holycross–Ballycahill
Club titles
- Tipperary titles: 1
Inter-county*
Years	County	Apps (scores)
1978-1984	Tipperary	1 (0-00)
Inter-county titles
- Munster titles: 0
- All-Irelands: 0
- NHL: 1
- All Stars: 0
- *Inter County team apps and scores correct as of 20:45, 27 August 2021.

Johnny Doyle (born 1957) is an Irish former hurler. At club level he played with Holycross–Ballycahill and was also a member of the Tipperary senior hurling team. He usually lined out as a corner-back.

== Honours ==
Holycross–Ballycahill

- Tipperary Senior Hurling Championship: 1990
- Mid Tipperary Senior Hurling Championship: 1978, 1985, 1989, 1990, 1991

Tipperary

- National Hurling League: 1978-79
- Munster Under-21 Hurling Championship: 1978
- Munster Minor Hurling Championship: 1973
