= Tom Dwan (hurler) =

Irish hurler (1889–1980)

Personal information
- Native name: Tomás Ó Duáin (Irish)
- Born: 22 November 1889 Thurles, County Tipperary, Ireland
- Died: 17 May 1980 (aged 90) Thurles, County Tipperary, Ireland
- Occupation: Farmer

Sport
- Sport: Hurling
- Position: Goalkeeper
Clubs
- Years: Club
- Holycross–Ballycahill; Thurles Sarsfields
Club titles
- Tipperary titles: 1
Inter-county
- Years: County
- 1912-1924: Tipperary
Inter-county titles
- Munster titles: 2
- All-Irelands: 1

Thomas Dwan (22 November 1889 – 17 May 1980) was an Irish hurler. Usually lining out as a goalkeeper or as a back, he was a member of the Tipperary team that won the 1916 All-Ireland Championship.

Dwan began his club hurling with Holycross–Ballycahill before later joining the Thurles Sarsfields club, with whom he won his sole county championship medal.

After being selected for the Tipperary junior team in 1910, Dwan eventually captained the team to the All-Ireland title in 1915. By this stage he had also joined the Tipperary senior team. Dwan won his first Munster medal in 1916 before later winning his sole All-Ireland medal after Tipperary's defeat of Kilkenny in the final. He won a second Munster medal in 1922 after being joined on the team by his brother Billy.

In retirement from playing, Dwan served as a selector with the Tipperary senior team. He was a member of the selection committee for Tipperary's All-Ireland victories in 1949 and 1950.

Dwan died on 17 May 1980. At the time he was the last surviving member of the 1916 All-Ireland-winning team.

== Honours ==
=== Player ===
Tipperary

- All-Ireland Senior Hurling Championship (1): 1916
- Munster Senior Hurling Championship (2): 1916, 1922

=== Selector ===
Tipperary

- All-Ireland Senior Hurling Championship (2): 1949, 1950
- Munster Senior Hurling Championship (2): 1949, 1950

Achievements
Preceded by Dan Minogue	All-Ireland Junior Hurling Final winning captain 1915	Succeeded by Michael Brophy
