= 2003 Tipperary county hurling team season =

Tipperary county hurling team
2003 season
Manager	Michael Doyle
All-Ireland SHC	Semi-final
Munster SHC	Quarter-final
National League	Finalists
Top scorer	Eoin Kelly (2-30)
Highest SHC attendance	60,087 v Kilkenny (17 August)
- Lowest SHC attendance
Standard colours

In 2003 Tipperary competed in the National Hurling League and the Munster and All-Ireland championships. On 5 November 2002 Michael Doyle was appointed manager of the team, along with selectors Liam Sheedy and Kevin Fox. It was Doyle's first year in charge of the team with Brian O'Meara named as team captain. Finches continued as sponsors of Tipperary GAA. Doyle resigned as manager in September after one year in charge.

== National Hurling League ==
=== Division 1B table ===
Pos	Team	Pld	W	D	L	Pts	Notes
1	Tipperary	5	4	0	1	8	Advanced to Group 1
2	Cork	5	4	0	1	8	Advanced to Group 1
3	Wexford	5	3	0	2	6	Advanced to Group 1
4	Offaly	5	3	0	2	6	Advanced to Group 2
5	Limerick	5	1	0	4	2	Advanced to Group 2
6	Derry	5	0	0	5	0	Advanced to Group 2

23 February 2003 Round 1	Tipperary	4-14 - 1-8	Offaly	MacDonagh Park, Nenagh
	L Corbett 3-3, E Kelly 0-6, B O’Meara 1-0, C Gleeson 0-3, T Dunne 0-1, M Ryan 0-1.		B Carroll 0-6, D Murray 1-0, G Oakley 0-1, C Cassidy 0-1.	Referee: P Neary (Kilkenny)

8 March 2003 Round 2	Tipperary	1-17 - 1-8	Limerick	Semple Stadium, Thurles
	L Corbett 1-3, E Kelly 0-5, T Dunne 0-3, B O’Meara 0-2, C Gleeson 0-1, M O’Leary 0-1, G O’Grady 0-1, E Brislane 0-1.		D Sheehan 1-1, J Meskell 0-4, M Foley 0-2, B Foley 0-1.	Referee: S McMahon (Clare)

16 March 2003 Round 3	Tipperary	3-21 - 1-11	Wexford	MacDonagh Park, Nenagh
	E Kelly 1-6, L Corbett 2-2, T Dunne 0-4, M O’Leary 0-3, C Gleeson 0-3, G O’Grady 0-2, C Morrissey 0-1.		P Codd 1-7, B Lambert 0-2, M Jordan 0-1, A Fenlon 0-1.	Referee: P Ahern (Carlow)

23 March 2003 Round 4	Derry	2-14 - 4-19	Tipperary	O'Cahan Park, Dungiven
	O Collins 1-11, D McGrellis 1-0, R Kennedy 0-1, D Magill 0-1, P O’Kane 0-1.		E Kelly 1-10, E O’Neill 2-1, L Cahill 1-0, G O’Grady 0-3, C Morrissey 0-2, B O’Meara 0-1, D Kennedy 0-1, L Corbett 0-1.	Referee: J Gribben (Down)

29 March 2003 Round 5	Tipperary	4-11 - 4-15	Cork	Semple Stadium, Thurles
	E Kelly (3-5), T Dunne (1-2), B O'Meara (0-1), C Gleeson (0-1), M O'Leary (0-1); L Corbett (0-1).		J Deane (1-7), S Ó hAilpín (2-0), A Browne (1-1), M O'Connell (0-2); N McCarthy (0-2), J O'Connor (0-1); J Gardiner (0-1), B O'Connor (0-1).	Referee: B Kelly (Westmeath)

=== Group 1 table ===
Pos	Team	Pld	W	D	L	Pts	Notes
1	Tipperary	3	2	1	0	13	Division 1 runners-up
2	Kilkenny	3	1	1	1	13	Division 1 champions
3	Cork	3	2	0	1	12	
4	Wexford	3	1	1	1	9	
5	Galway	3	1	1	1	7	
6	Clare	3	0	0	3	6	

13 April 2003 Round 1	Kilkenny	2-16 - 2-19	Tipperary	Nowlan Park, Kilkenny
	H Shefflin 0-8, DJ Carey 1-3, C Carter 1-0, T Walsh 0-2, E Brennan 0-2, R Mullally 0-1.		G O’Grady 1-6, E Kelly 0-7, M O’Leary 1-2, T Dunne 0-2, C Gleeson 0-1, L Corbett 0-1.	Referee: M Wadding (Waterford)

20 April 2003 Round 2	Tipperary	3-15 - 2-18	Galway	Semple Stadium, Thurles
	T Dunne 1-3, C Gleeson 1-1, E Kelly 0-4, L Corbett 1-0, P Kelly 0-3, L Cahill 0-3, G O’Grady 0-1.		R Murray 0-8, O Fahy 1-3, D Tierney 1-1, C Moore 0-2, D Forde 0-2, A Kerins 0-1, J Conroy 0-1.	Referee: P Aherne (Carlow)

27 April 2003 Round 3	Clare	0-14 - 0-22	Tipperary	Cusack Park, Ennis
	N Gilligan 0-4, A Quinn 0-4, S McMahon 0-3, T Griffin 0-2, D McMahon 0-1.		E Kelly 0-6, E O’Neill 0-5, T Dunne 0-4, L Corbett 0-2, L Cahill 0-2, M O’Leary 0-2, C Gleeson 0-1.	Referee: M Wadding (Waterford)

=== Knock-out stage ===
5 May 2003 Final	Kilkenny	5-14 - 5-13	Tipperary	Croke Park
	H Shefflin 1-6 (0-4f), DJ Carey (0-3f), E Brennan 1-3 each, M Comerford 1-2, C Carter 1-0.	Report	E Kelly 1-7 (1-3f), L Corbett, J Carroll 2-0 each, C Gleeson 0-2, T Dunne (f), E Brislane, P Kelly, L Cahill 0-1 each.	Referee: P O'Connor (Limerick)

== 2003 Munster Senior Hurling Championship ==
18 May
Quarter-final

Clare	2-17 - 0-14	Tipperary
N. Gilligan 0-6 (0-3 frees); A. Quinn 1-2; J. O'Connor 1-1; C. Lynch 0-2; A. Markham 0-2; T. Carmody, T. Griffin, D. McMahon, S. McMahon (free), 0-1 each		E. Kelly 0-7 (0-4 frees); B. O'Meara 0-3; T. Dunne, C. Gleeson, L. Cahill, J. Carroll, 0-1 each

Páirc Uí Chaoimh, Cork
Referee: A. Mac Suibhne (Dublin)

== 2003 All-Ireland Senior Hurling Championship ==
14 June
Round 1

Tipperary	3-28 - 0-13	Laois
P Kelly (0-3, 165, 1f), M O’Leary (0-3), C Gleeson (0-3), G O’Grady (0-2)), J Carroll (0-1), E Kelly (2-8), D Byrne (0-6, 2f), B O’Meara (1-1), L Corbett (0-1))		C Coonan (0-1)), J Young (0-5, 1pen, 165, 2f), J Phelan (0-1), E Maher (0-2)), L Tynan (0-1), B McCormack (0-2), D Cuddy (0-1)

O'Moore Park, Portlaoise
Referee: T. McIntyre (Antrim) Match Report
13 July
Round 2

Galway	1-17 - 1-18	Tipperary
R. Gantley 0-7 (0-5 frees); D. Hayes 1-1; K. Broderick 0-2; D. Tierney 0-2; A. Kerins 0-2; O. Canning, R. Murray, O. Fahy, 0-1 each		L. Corbett 0-4; B. Dunne 1-1; M. O'Leary 0-3; B. O'Meara 0-2; J. Carroll 0-2; E. Kelly 0-2 (frees); P. Kelly, G. O'Grady, C. Gleeson, E. Enright, 0-1 each

Pearse Stadium, Galway
Referee: D Murphy (Wexford) Match Report
27 July
Quarter-final

Tipperary	2-16 - 2-11	Offaly
E. Kelly 0-5 (0-3 frees); J. Carroll, B. O'Meara 1-0 each; P. Kelly 0-3 (0-1 free); T. Dunne 0-3 (0-2 '65's); B. Dunne, M. O'Leary, L. Corbett, E. Corcoran, C. Gleeson 0-1 each		G. Hanniffy 1-2; N. Coughlan 1-1; B. Carroll 0-2 frees; R. Hanniffy 0-2 (0-1 free); B. Murphy, C Cassidy, M. Cordial, S. Whelahan 0-1 each

Croke Park, Dublin
Referee: G Harrington (Cork) Match Report
17 August
Semi-final

Kilkenny	3-18 - 0-15	Tipperary
H. Shefflin 1-7 (0-5 frees); E. Brennan 1-4; T. Walsh 1-0; D.J. Carey 0-3 seventies; D. Lyng 0-2; J. Hoyne and J. Coogan 0-1 each		E. Kelly 0-8 (0-6 frees); C. Gleeson 0-2; P. Kelly, J. Carroll, P. O'Meara, E. Enright and P. O'Brien 0-1 each

Croke Park, Dublin
Referee: P. O'Connor (Limerick) Match Report

== Awards ==
Tipperary won one All Star Award with goalkeeper Brendan Cummins picking up his third award.
