= 1954 Tipperary Senior Hurling Championship =

Annual hurling competition season

- Dates: 22 August 1954 – 3 October 1954
- Teams: 4
- Champions: Holycross-Ballycahill (3rd title); Francis Maher (captain)
- Runners-up: Roscrea

Tournament statistics
- Matches played: 3
- Goals scored: 15 (5 per match)
- Points scored: 23 (7.67 per match)

The 1954 Tipperary Senior Hurling Championship was the 63rd staging of the Tipperary Senior Hurling Championship since its establishment by the Tipperary County Board in 1887. The championship began on 22 August 1954 and ended on 3 October 1954.

Borris–Ileigh were the defending champions, however, they were beaten by Roscrea in the North Tipperary SHC final.

The final was played on 3 October 1954 at Thurles Sportsfield, between Holycross–Ballycahill and Roscrea, in what was their first ever meeting in the final. Holycross–Ballycahill won the match by 6–05 to 2–03 to claim their third championship title overall and a first title in three years.

== Qualification ==
Championship	Champions
Mid Tipperary Senior Hurling Championship	Holycross-Ballycahill
North Tipperary Senior Hurling Championship	Roscrea
South Tipperary Senior Hurling Championship	Killenaule
West Tipperary Senior Hurling Championship	Knockavilla Kickhams

== Results ==
=== Semi-finals ===
22 August 1954 Semi-final	Holycross-Ballycahill	4-07 - 1-02	Knockavilla Kickhams	Leahy Park

12 September 1954 Semi-final	Roscrea	2-03 - 0-03	Killenaule	Thurles Sportsfield

=== Final ===
3 October 1954 Final	Holycross-Ballycahill	6-05 - 2-03	Roscrea	Thurles Sportsfield
