= Joe Bannon =

Irish hurler (1895–1975)

Personal information
- Native name: Seosamh Ó Banáin (Irish)
- Born: 10 March 1895 Ballycahill, County Tipperary, Ireland
- Died: 4 February 1975 (aged 79) Arbour Hill, Dublin, Ireland
- Occupation: ESB employee

Sport
- Sport: Hurling
- Position: Right corner-back
Clubs
- Years: Club
- Faughs; Young Irelands
Inter-county
- Years: County
- 1923–1934: Dublin
Inter-county titles
- Leinster titles: 3
- All-Irelands: 2

Joseph Bannon (25 April 1894 - 4 February 1975) was an Irish hurler. Usually lining out as a corner-back, he was a member of the Dublin county team that won the All-Ireland Championship in 1924 and 1927.

Bannon enjoyed a lengthy career as a full-back with the Faughs and Young Irelands clubs in Dublin, winning several championship medals.

After being selected for the Dublin senior team in 1923, Bannon was a regular member of the team for much of the next decade. He won his first Leinster medal in 1924 before later winning his first All-Ireland medal after Dublin's defeat of Galway in the final. Bannon won a second set of Leinster and All-Ireland medals in 1927 before winning his third and final provincial title at the age of forty in 1934.

Bannon died on 4 February 1975.

== Honours ==
Dublin

- All-Ireland Senior Hurling Championship (2): 1924, 1927
- Leinster Senior Hurling Championship (3): 1924, 1927, 1934
