= 1948 Tipperary Senior Hurling Championship =

Annual hurling competition season

- Dates: 12 September – 3 October 1948
- Teams: 4
- Champions: Holycross-Ballycahill (1st title); P. Maher (captain)
- Runners-up: Lorrha

Tournament statistics
- Matches played: 3
- Goals scored: 16 (5.33 per match)
- Points scored: 32 (10.67 per match)

The 1948 Tipperary Senior Hurling Championship was the 57th staging of the Tipperary Senior Hurling Championship since its establishment by the Tipperary County Board in 1887. The championship ran from 12 September to 3 October 1948.

Carrick Swans were the defending champions, however, they were beaten by Holycross–Ballycahill in the semi-finals.

The final was played on 3 October 1948 at MacDonagh Park in Nenagh, between first-time finalists Holycross–Ballycahill and Lorrha. Holycross–Ballycahill won the match by 4–10 to 2–04 to claim their first ever championship title.

== Qualification ==
Championship	Champions
Mid Tipperary Senior Hurling Championship	Holycross–Ballycahill
North Tipperary Senior Hurling Championship	Lorrha
South Tipperary Senior Hurling Championship	Carrick Swans
West Tipperary Senior Hurling Championship	Cashel King Cormacs

== Results ==
=== Semi-finals ===
12 September 1948 Semi-final	Holycross–Ballycahill	3-09 - 3-02	Carrick Swans	Clonmel GAA Ground

19 September 1948 Semi-final	Lorrha	2-04 - 2-03	Cashel King Cormacs	Thurles Sportsfield

=== Final ===
3 October 1948 Final	Holycross–Ballycahill	4-10 - 2-04	Lorrha	MacDonagh Park
