= 1932 All-Ireland Minor Hurling Championship =

All-Ireland Minor Hurling Championship 1932
All Ireland Champions
- Winners: Tipperary (2nd win)
- Captain: Denis O'Gorman

All Ireland Runners-up
- Runners-up: Kilkenny

Provincial Champions
- Munster: Tipperary
- Leinster: Kilkenny
- Ulster: Down
- Connacht: Galway

The 1932 All-Ireland Minor Hurling Championship was the fifth staging of the All-Ireland Minor Hurling Championship since its establishment by the Gaelic Athletic Association in 1928.

Kilkenny entered the championship as the defending champions.

On 2 October 1932 Tipperary won the championship following an 8–6 to 5–1 defeat of Kilkenny in the All-Ireland final. This was their second All-Ireland title.

== Results ==
=== All-Ireland Minor Hurling Championship ===
Semi-finals

16 August 1932 Semi-final	Tipperary	6-6 - 0-0	Galway	Markets Field, Limerick

4 September 1932 Semi-final	Kilkenny	3-7 - 2-2	Down	Croke Park, Dublin

Final

2 October 1932 Final	Tipperary	8-6 - 5-1	Kilkenny	Croke Park, Dublin

== Championship statistics ==
=== Miscellaneous ===
- The All-Ireland semi-final is the very first championship meeting between Galway and Tipperary.
