= 1951 Tipperary Senior Hurling Championship =

Annual hurling competition season

- Dates: 7 October – 4 November 1951
- Teams: 4
- Champions: Holycross–Ballycahill (2nd title); Francis Maher (captain)
- Runners-up: Clonoulty

Tournament statistics
- Matches played: 3
- Goals scored: 18 (6 per match)
- Points scored: 46 (15.33 per match)

The 1951 Tipperary Senior Hurling Championship was the 60th staging of the Tipperary Senior Hurling Championship since its establishment by the Tipperary County Board in 1887. The championship ran from 7 October to 4 November 1951.

Borris-Ileigh were the defending champions, however, they were beaten by Clonoulty in the semi-finals.

The final was played on 4 November 1951 at Thurles Sportsfield, between Holycross–Ballycahill and Clonoulty, in what was their first ever meeting in the final. Holycross–Ballycahill won the match by 5–15 to 1–04 to claim their second championship title overall and a first title in three years.

== Qualification ==
Championship	Champions
Mid Tipperary Senior Hurling Championship	Holycross-Ballycahill
North Tipperary Senior Hurling Championship	Borris-Ileigh
South Tipperary Senior Hurling Championship	Coolmoyne
West Tipperary Senior Hurling Championship	Clonoulty

== Results ==
=== Semi-finals ===
7 October 1951 Semi-final	Holycross–Ballycahill	7-06 - 1-06	Coolmoyne	Clonmel Sportsfield

21 October 1951 Semi-final	Clonoulty	3-07 - 1-08	Borris-Ileigh	Thurles Sportsfield

=== Final ===
4 November 1951 Final	Holycross–Ballycahill	5-15 - 1-04	Clonoulty	Thurles Sportsfield
