= Denis O'Gorman (hurler) =

Irish hurler

Personal information
- Native name: Donncha Ó Gormáin (Irish)
- Born: 28 August 1914 Holycross, County Tipperary, Ireland
- Died: 1 May 2005 (aged 90) Holycross, County Tipperary, Ireland

Sport
- Sport: Hurling
- Position: Left corner-back
Club
- Years: Club
- 1930s–1940s: Holycross–Ballycahill
Club titles
- Tipperary titles: 0
Inter-county
- Years: County
- 1934–1942: Tipperary
Inter-county titles
- Munster titles: 2
- All-Irelands: 1
- NHL: 0

Denis O'Gorman (28 August 1914 – 1 May 2005) was an Irish hurler who played as a left corner-back and as a goalkeeper for the Tipperary senior team.

O'Gorman made his first appearance for the team during the 1934 championship and was a regular player over the course of the next decade. During that time he won one All-Ireland winners' medal and two Munster winner's medals.

At club level, he enjoyed a lengthy career with Holycross–Ballycahill, however, a county club championship winners' medals eluded him.

O'Gorman also won four Railway Cup winners' medals with Munster.

Achievements
Preceded by John Shortall (Kilkenny)	All-Ireland Minor Hurling Final winning captain 1932	Succeeded by Joe Fletcher (Tipperary)
