= 1946 All-Ireland Minor Hurling Championship =

All-Ireland Minor Hurling Championship 1946
All Ireland Champions
- Winners: Dublin (2nd win)
- Captain: Geoff Sutton

All Ireland Runners-up
- Runners-up: Tipperary
- Captain: Paddy Kenny

Provincial Champions
- Munster: Tipperary
- Leinster: Dublin
- Ulster: Antrim
- Connacht: Galway

The 1946 All-Ireland Minor Hurling Championship was the 16th staging of the All-Ireland Minor Hurling Championship since its establishment by the Gaelic Athletic Association in 1928.

Dublin entered the championship as the defending champions.

On 1 September 1946 Dublin won the championship following a 1-6 to 0-7 defeat of Tipperary in the All-Ireland final. This was their second All-Ireland title in-a-row.

== Results ==
=== All-Ireland Minor Hurling Championship ===
Semi-finals

28 July 1946 Semi-final	Tipperary	5-06 - 0-01	Galway	St. Brendan's Park, Birr

11 August 1946 Semi-final	Dublin	8-03 - 1-00	Antrim	Belfast

Final

1 September 1946 Final	Dublin	1-06 - 0-07	Tipperary	Croke Park, Dublin

== Championship statistics ==
=== Miscellaneous ===
- Dublin became the fourth team to win back-to-back All-Ireland Championship titles.
