= 1945 All-Ireland Minor Hurling Championship =

All-Ireland Minor Hurling Championship 1945
All Ireland Champions
- Winners: Dublin (1st win)
- Captain: Des Healy

All Ireland Runners-up
- Runners-up: Tipperary
- Captain: Pat Stakelum

Provincial Champions
- Munster: Tipperary
- Leinster: Dublin
- Ulster: Antrim
- Connacht: Galway

The 1945 All-Ireland Minor Hurling Championship was the 15th staging of the All-Ireland Minor Hurling Championship since its establishment by the Gaelic Athletic Association in 1928. As a result of the Emergency it was the first championship to be staged since 1941.

Cork entered the championship as the defending champions, however, they were beaten by Tipperary in the Munster semi-final.

On 2 September 1945 Dublin won the championship following a 3-14 to 4-6 defeat of Tipperary in the All-Ireland final. This was their first All-Ireland title.

== Results ==
=== Leinster Minor Hurling Championship ===
First round

13 May 1945 First round	Kilkenny	7-07 - 2-01	Wexford	Nowlan Park

20 May 1945 First round	Offaly	12-01 - 1-00	Laois	St. Brendan's Park

Semi-finals

3 June 1945 Semi-final	Dublin	8-08 - 1-01	Meath	Croke Park

1 July 1945 Semi-final	Kilkenny	14-03 - 0-00	Offaly	Nowlan Park

Final

15 July 1945 Final	Dublin	5-04 - 3-01	Kilkenny	Croke Park

=== Munster Minor Hurling Championship ===
First round

10 June 1945 First round	Tipperary	6-08 - 3-02	Waterford	Fermoy Sportsfield

Semi-finals

24 June 1945 Semi-final	Clare	5-09 - 2-08	Limerick	Cusack Park

1 July 1945 Semi-final	Tipperary	6-11 - 4-02	Cork	Thurles Sportsfield

Final

15 July 1945 Final	Tipperary	8-10 - 0-02	Clare	Thurles Sportsfield

=== Ulster Minor Hurling Championship ===
First round

3 June 1945 First round	Derry	2-04 - 8-03	Donegal	Celtic Park

Semi-finals

15 July 1945 Semi-final	Donegal	9-09 - 4-05	Down	Celtic Park

Final

22 July 1945 Final	Antrim	11-06 - 1-01	Donegal	Celtic Park

=== All-Ireland Minor Hurling Championship ===
Semi-finals

29 July 1945 Semi-final	Tipperary	5-16 - 0-02	Galway	St. Brendan's Park

5 August 1945 Semi-final	Dublin	9-04 - 3-01	Antrim	Croke Park

Final

2 September 1945 Final	Dublin	3-14 - 4-06	Tipperary	Croke Park

== Championship statistics ==
=== Miscellaneous ===
- The All-Ireland final between Dublin and Tipperary was the first ever championship meeting between the two teams.
- Dublin became the sixth team to win the All-Ireland Championship title.
