= Holycross–Ballycahill GAA =

Gaelic sports club in County Tipperary, Ireland

Holycross–Ballycahill
- Mainistir na Croise Naofa–Bealach Achaille
- Founded: 1885
- County: Tipperary
- Colours: Green and White
- Grounds: St. Michael's Park, Holycross
- Coordinates: 52°38′57.55″N 7°52′34.38″W

Playing kits
Standard colours

Senior Club Championships
	All Ireland	Munster champions	Tipperary champions
Hurling:	-	-	4

Holycross–Ballycahill GAA is a Gaelic games club in County Tipperary, Ireland. Both hurling and Gaelic football are played in the Mid-Tipperary divisional competitions. The club is centred on the villages of Holycross and Ballycahill and is 5 kilometres (3 mi) from Thurles town centre (7 kilometres (4 mi) by road).

== History ==
The club was founded in 1885. Holycross–Ballycahill compete in the Tipperary Senior Hurling Championship.

The period from 1947 to 1953 was the club's golden era. It won four Mid Tipperary Senior Titles and three Senior County Tipperary titles in 1948, 1951 and 1954, under the captaincy of Francis Maher.

A Mid Senior title was won in 1966, before the club reverted to the Junior ranks in 1971. A Junior County championship win in 1974, brought a revival to Holycross–Ballycahill GAA, which resulted in Mid Senior titles in 1978, 1985, 1989 and 1990.

The club added their fourth and most recent County Senior title in 1990 defeating Cashel King Cormacs. The team was led by Declan Carr who went on to lift the Liam MacCarthy Cup as Tipperary GAA captain 1991. They lifted All Ireland Junior B Hurling title in 2014 under the captaincy of Padraig McGrath, one of the club's finest achievements in recent years.

During Tipperary hurling's greatest years, Holycross-Ballycahill GAA club provided Pat Stakelum, who captained the 1949 All Ireland winning team. John Doyle won 8 All Ireland medals during this time with Tipperary, a record which he and Christy Ring held until 2011. Another Holycross-Ballycahill man, Phil Cahill, won All-Ireland medals in 1925 and 1930. Michael Maher collected 5 All-Ireland hurling medals with Tipperary during this time. Denis O'Gorman is one of a few to hold All Ireland medals in Senior, Junior and Minor grades. Declan Carr won All Ireland medals in 1989 and 1991 (as captain), and also became the club's first All Star.

In 1979 Michael Doyle captained Tipperary to U21 Munster and All Ireland hurling titles. He subsequently went on to manage Tipperary to U21 Munster and All Ireland honours in 1995.

The club is located just outside the village of Holycross. In May 2011, a new multi-function complex was opened on the club's grounds, known as the John Doyle Centre. On the day of the new facilities opening, a tournament game was held between Tipperary and Waterford.

Since 2012, Holycross–Ballycahill GAA's grounds have hosted the Cut-Loose Country music festival. Performances have included Nathan Carter, Mike Denver, Daniel O'Donnell, Lisa McHugh among others.

== Honours ==
Mid Tipperary Championships:

- Mid Tipperary Hurling Championship: (12) 1947, 1948, 1951, 1954, 1966, 1978, 1985, 1989, 1990, 1991, 1997, 1999
- Mid Tipperary Intermediate Hurling Championship: (1) 1990
- Mid Tipperary Junior "A" Hurling Championship: (14) 1922 (as Holycross), 1941, 1974, 1980, 1988, 2006, 2007, 2008, 2016, 2017, 2020, 2021, 2024, 2025
- Mid Tipperary Junior "B" Hurling Championship: (4) 1975, 1992, 2012, 2013
- Mid Tipperary U21 "A" Hurling Championship: (10) 1963, 1977, 1978, 1983, 1993, 1996, 2017, 2019, 2024, 2025
- Mid Tipperary Under-21 B Hurling Championship: (1) 2006
- Mid Tipperary U19 "A" Hurling Championship: (4) 2022, 2023, 2024, 2025
- Mid Tipperary Under-19 B Hurling Championship: (1) 2021
- Mid Tipperary Minor "A" Hurling Championship: (8) 1982, 1984, 1990, 1991, 2012, 2013, 2014, 2023
- Mid Tipperary Minor "B" Hurling Championship: (2) 2005, 2010
- Cahill Cup Hurling: (12) (Last in 2026)
- Mid Tipperary Intermediate Football Championship: (9) 1976, 1983, 1984, 1989, 2001, 2002, 2003, 2010, 2011
- Mid Tipperary Junior "A" Football Championship: (7) 1946, 1954, 1976, 1982, 1994, 1995, 2019
- Mid Tipperary U21 "A" Football Championship: (4) 1982, 1984, 1985, 1999
- Mid Tipperary U21 "B" Football Championship: (1) 2005
- Mid Tipperary Minor "A" Football Championship: (2) 1991, 1997
- Mid Tipperary Minor "B" Football Championship: (3) 1996, 2001, 2004

County Championships:

- Tipperary Senior Hurling Championship: (4) 1948, 1951, 1954, 1990 (Runners-Up 1964, 1989, 1991)
- Tipperary Junior A Hurling Championship: (5) 1941, 1974, 1988, 2010, 2025
- Tipperary Junior "B" Hurling Championship: (1) 2013
- Tipperary Under-21 "A" Hurling Championship: (4) 1978, 1996, 2024, 2025
- Tipperary Under-19 "A" Hurling Championship: (3) 2022, 2023, 2024
- Tipperary Under-19 "B" Hurling Championship: (1) 2021
- Tipperary Minor "A" Hurling Championship: (2) 1982, 2022,
- Tipperary Minor "B" Hurling Championship: (1) 2010
- Tipperary Junior "A" Football Championship: (2) 1982, 1995
- Tipperary Under-21 "A" Football Championship: (1) 1999
- Tipperary Under-21 "B" Football Championship: (1) 2005
- Tipperary Minor "B" Football Championship: (1) 1996

All-Ireland Championships:

- All-Ireland Junior B Club Hurling Championship: 1 (Last in 2014)

== Notable players ==
- John Doyle, Eight time All-Ireland Senior Hurling Championship winner, 1964 Texaco Hurler of the Year, Hurling Team of the Century and Millennium, No.13 in 125 Greatest Gtars of the GAA, GAA Hall of Fame Inductee: 2013
- Declan Carr, Two time All-Ireland Senior Hurling Championship winner, Tipperary 1991 All-Ireland Senior Hurling Championship Winning Captain, Two time All-Star.
- Pat Stakelum, Three time All-Ireland Senior Hurling Championship winner 1949 All-Ireland Senior Hurling Championship Winning Captain, 1993 GAA All-Time All-Star Award
- Cathal Barrett, Two time All-Ireland Senior Hurling Championship winner 2014 All Stars Young Hurler of the Year, Two time All-Star winner.
- Michael Maher Five time All-Ireland Senior Hurling Championship winner.
- Phil Cahill Two time All-Ireland Senior Hurling Championship winner
- Michael Doyle, Tipperary 1979 All-Ireland Under-21 Hurling Championship Winning Captain, 1995 All-Ireland Under-21 Hurling Championship winning manager, Tipperary Senior Manager.
- Tom Dwan All-Ireland Senior Hurling Championship winner, 1915 All-Ireland Junior Hurling Championship winning captain.
- Tim Gleeson Two time All-Ireland Senior Hurling Championship winner.
- Tony Lanigan Two time All-Ireland Senior Hurling Championship winner.
- Michael O'Dwyer All-Ireland Senior Hurling Championship winner.
- Denis O'Gorman, 1932 All-Ireland Minor Hurling Championship Winning Captain
- Bryan O'Mara 2025 All-Ireland Senior Hurling Championship winner
- Johnny Doyle

== All-Ireland Medal winners ==
Senior Hurling in Chronological Order

- Michael O'Dwyer: 1 (1908)
- Tom Dwan: 1 (1916, with Thurles)
- Joe Bannon: 2 (1924, 27, both with Dublin)
- Tom Barry: 2 (1924, 27, both with Dublin)
- Phil Cahill: 2 (1925, 1930)
- Denis O'Gorman: 1 (1937)
- John Doyle (hurler): 8 (1949, 50, 51, 58, 61, 62, 64, 65)
- Michael Maher: 5 (1958, 61, 62, 64, 65)
- Pat Stakelum: 3 (1949 as Captain, 50, 51)
- Ned O'Gorman: 1 (1949)
- Bob Stakelum: 1 (1949)
- Declan Carr: 2 (1989, 1991 as Captain)
- Cathal Barrett: 2 (2016, 2019)
