= 1947 All-Ireland Minor Hurling Championship =

All-Ireland Minor Hurling Championship 1947
All Ireland Champions
- Winners: Tipperary (5th win)
- Captain: Paddy Kenny

All Ireland Runners-up
- Runners-up: Galway
- Captain: Kieran McNamee

Provincial Champions
- Munster: Tipperary
- Leinster: Dublin
- Ulster: Antrim
- Connacht: Galway

The 1947 All-Ireland Minor Hurling Championship was the 17th staging of the All-Ireland Minor Hurling Championship since its establishment by the Gaelic Athletic Association in 1928.

Dublin entered the championship as the defending champions, however, they were beaten by Galway in the All-Ireland semi-final.

On 7 September 1947 Tipperary won the championship following a 9-5 to 1-5 defeat of Galway in the All-Ireland final. This was their fifth All-Ireland title and their first in ten championship seasons.

== Results ==
=== All-Ireland Minor Hurling Championship ===
Semi-finals

| 27 July 1947 Semi-final | Galway | 5-01 - 3-01 | Dublin | St. Brendan's Park, Birr |

| 10 August 1947 Semi-final | Tipperary | 5-12 - 1-04 | Antrim | Croke Park, Dublin |

Final

| 7 September 1947 Final | Tipperary | 9-05 - 1-05 | Galway | Croke Park, Dublin |

== Championship statistics ==
=== Miscellaneous ===
- The All-Ireland semi-final between Dublin and Galway was the first ever championship meeting between the two teams.
