= Mid Tipperary Senior Hurling Championship =

Hurling competition in Ireland

- Code: Hurling
- Founded: 1907; 119 years ago
- Region: Mid Tipperary (GAA)
- No. of teams: 7
- Title holders: Loughmore–Castleiney (15th title)
- First winner: Thurles
- Most titles: Thurles Sarsfields (47 titles)
- Sponsors: Centenary Agri
- Official website: Official website

The Mid Tipperary Senior Hurling Championship (known for sponsorship reasons as the Centenary Agri Mid Tipperary Senior Hurling Championship) is an annual hurling competition organised by the Mid Tipperary Board of the Gaelic Athletic Association since 1907 for senior hurling teams in Mid Tipperary, Ireland.

The series of games begin in April, with the championship culminating with the final in August. The championship has always been played using a knock-out format.

The Mid Tipperary Championship was, until recent times, an integral part of the wider Tipperary Senior Hurling Championship. The winners and runners-up of the Mid Tipperary Championship joined their counterparts from the other three divisions to contest the county championship quarter-finals.

Seven clubs currently participate in the Mid Tipperary Championship. The all-time record-holders are Thurles Sarsfields, who have won a total of 45 titles.

== The championship ==
=== Overview ===
The Mid Tipperary Championship is a knockout tournament with pairings drawn at random — there are no seeds.

Each match is played as a single leg. If a match ends as a draw there is a period of extra time, followed by a second period of extra time should the teams remain deadlocked. If both sides are still level at the end of extra time a replay takes place and so on until a winner is found.

== Roll of honour ==
#	Team	Wins	Years won
1	Thurles Sarsfields	47	1907, 1908, 1909, 1911, 1912, 1915, 1925, 1929, 1935, 1936, 1938, 1939, 1942, 1944, 1945, 1946, 1950, 1952, 1955, 1956, 1957, 1958, 1959, 1960, 1961, 1962, 1963, 1964, 1965, 1968, 1969, 1973, 1975, 1979, 1980, 1993, 1996, 2000, 2001, 2005, 2007, 2010, 2012, 2015, 2017, 2021, 2023
2	Moycarkey-Borris	17	1922, 1923, 1924, 1926, 1930, 1931, 1932, 1933, 1934, 1937, 1940, 1943, 1965, 1967, 1971, 1981, 1982
3	Loughmore-Castleiney	15	1983, 1986, 1987, 1988, 1992, 1994, 1998, 2002, 2003, 2004, 2011, 2016, 2018, 2024, 2026
4	Holycross-Ballycahill	12	1947, 1948, 1951, 1954, 1966, 1978, 1985, 1989, 1990, 1991, 1997, 1999
5	Boherlahen-Dualla	9	1913, 1914, 1916, 1917, 1918, 1919, 1941, 1953, 1995
6	Drom-Inch	8	1974, 1984, 2006, 2008, 2009, 2013, 2014, 2019
7	Moyne-Templetuohy	4	1970, 1972, 1976, 1977
8	JK Brackens	2	2022, 2025
9
9	Two-Mile-Borris	1	1910
9	Moycarkey-Thurles	1	1920
9	Clonoulty-Rossmore	1	1927
9	Killea-Castleiney	1	1928
9	Borris-Ileigh	1	1949

== Finals ==
Year	Winner	Score	Opponent	Score
2026	Loughmore–Castleiney	1-29	Holycross–Ballycahill	0-25
2025	JK Bracken's	1-22	Moycarkey-Borris	2-18
2024	Loughmore-Castleiney	1-25	Moycarkey-Borris	1-16
2023	Thurles Sarsfields	0-18	Upperchurch-Drombane	0-16
2022	JK Bracken's	0-19	Drom-Inch	1-15
2021	Thurles Sarsfields	3-22	Loughmore-Castleiney	1-19
2020	Cancelled due to the COVID-19 pandemic			
2019	Drom-Inch	2-19	Upperchurch-Drombane	1-21
2018	Loughmore-Castleiney	2-28 (2-21 R)	Thurles Sarsfields	2-28 (1-21 R)
2017	Thurles Sarsfields	1-14	Upperchurch-Drombane	2-10
2016	Loughmore-Castleiney	1-20	Drom-Inch	2-16
2015	Thurles Sarsfields	1-17	Loughmore-Castleiney	2-13
2014	Drom-Inch	1-16	Upperchurch-Drombane	1-15
2013	Drom-Inch	3-20	Loughmore-Castleiney	1-11
2012	Thurles Sarsfields	7-16	Loughmore-Castleiney	2-13
2011	Loughmore-Castleiney	3-15	Drom-Inch	2-14
2010	Thurles Sarsfields	1-16	Drom-Inch	2-11
2009	Drom-Inch	2-11	Upperchurch-Drombane	0-14
2008	Drom-Inch	2-19	Thurles Sarsfields	0-21
2007	Thurles Sarsfields	0-22	Loughmore-Castleiney	3-09
2006	Drom-Inch	3-13	Boherlahan-Dualla	0-16
2005	Thurles Sarsfields	1-17 (1-17 R)	Drom-Inch	2-14 (0-13 R)
2004	Loughmore-Castleiney	1-10 (3-19 R)	Boherlahan-Dualla	0-13 (2-07 R)
2003	Loughmore-Castleiney	3-14	Thurles Sarsfields	2-13
2002	Loughmore-Castleiney	3-12	Moycarkey-Borris	3-10
2001	Thurles Sarsfields	2-13	Loughmore-Castleiney	1-09
2000	Thurles Sarsfields	1-20	Loughmore-Castleiney	3-11
1999	Holycross-Ballycahill	1-13	Loughmore-Castleiney	1-10
1998	Loughmore-Castleiney	1-10	Boherlahan-Dualla	1-05
1997	Holycross-Ballycahill	1-17	Boherlahan-Dualla	0-04
1996	Thurles Sarsfields	3-13	Boherlahan-Dualla	1-13
1995	Boherlahan-Dualla	1-13	Loughmore-Castleiney	1-08
1994	Loughmore-Castleiney	0-15	Thurles Sarsfields	1-08
1993	Thurles Sarsfields	3-14	Holycross-Ballycahill	1-08
1992	Loughmore-Castleiney	1-09 (3-18 R)	Thurles Sarsfields	0-12 (2-14 R)
1991	Holycross-Ballycahill	1-11 R	Moycarkey-Borris	0-09 R
1990	Holycross-Ballycahill	1-10 (2-19 R)	Loughmore-Castleiney	1-10 (1-18 R)
1989	Holycross-Ballycahill	2-13	Loughmore-Castleiney	2-09
1988	Loughmore-Castleiney	3-09	Holycross-Ballycahill	0-15
1987	Loughmore-Castleiney	2-11	Thurles Sarsfields	2-10
1986	Loughmore-Castleiney	1-11	Holycross-Ballycahill	0-12
1985	Holycross-Ballycahill	2-08	Thurles Sarsfields	1-09
1984	Drom-Inch	0-13 (1-09 R)	Moycarkey-Borris	2-07 (1-08 R)
1983	Loughmore-Castleiney	0-15	Moycarkey-Borris	0-11
1982	Moycarkey-Borris	4-10	Loughmore-Castleiney	2-09
1981	Moycarkey-Borris	3-10	Loughmore-Castleiney	2-09
1980	Thurles Sarsfields	1-10	Drom-Inch	1-06
1979	Thurles Sarsfields	2-20	Moycarkey-Borris	1-01
1978	Holycross-Ballycahill	2-12	Thurles Sarsfields	0-05
1977	Moyne-Templetuohy	2-09	Thurles Sarsfields	1-09
1976	Moyne-Templetuohy			
1975	Thurles Sarsfields			
1974	Drom-Inch			
1973	Thurles Sarsfields			
1972	Moyne-Templetuohy			
1971	Moycarkey-Borris			
1970	Moyne-Templetuohy			
1969	Thurles Sarsfields			
1968	Thurles Sarsfields			
1967	Moycarkey-Borris			
1966	Holycross-Ballycahill		Moycarkey-Borris	
1965	Moycarkey-Borris			
1964	Thurles Sarsfields			
1963	Thurles Sarsfields		Holycross-Ballycahill	
1962	Thurles Sarsfields			
1961	Thurles Sarsfields		Moycarkey-Borris	
1960	Thurles Sarsfields			
1959	Thurles Sarsfields			
1958	Thurles Sarsfields			
1957	Thurles Sarsfields			
1956	Thurles Sarsfields	4-11	Moycarkey-Borris	0-04
1955	Thurles Sarsfields			
1954	Holycross-Ballycahill			
1953	Boherlahan-Dualla	3-07	Thurles Sarsfields	2-08
1952	Thurles Sarsfields			
1951	Holycross-Ballycahill			
1950	Thurles Sarsfields			
1949	Borris-Ileigh			
1948	Holycross-Ballycahill			
1947	Holycross-Ballycahill			
1946	Thurles Sarsfields			
1945	Thurles Sarsfields			
1944	Thurles Sarsfields			
1943	Moycarkey-Borris			
1942	Thurles Sarsfields			
1941	Boherlahan-Dualla			
1940	Moycarkey-Borris			
1939	Thurles Sarsfields			
1938	Thurles Sarsfields			
1937	Moycarkey-Borris			
1936	Thurles Sarsfields		Moyne-Templetuohy	
1935	Thurles Sarsfields			
1934	Moycarkey-Borris			
1933	Moycarkey-Borris			
1932	Moycarkey-Borris			
1931	Moycarkey-Borris			
1930	Moycarkey-Borris			
1929	Thurles Sarsfields			
1928	Killea-Castleiney			
1927	Clonoulty-Rossmore			
1926	Moycarkey-Borris			
1925	Thurles Sarsfields			
1924	Moycarkey-Borris			
1923	Moycarkey-Borris			
1922	Moycarkey-Borris			
1921	No Championship			
1920	Moycarkey-Thurles			
1919	Boherlahan-Dualla			
1918	Boherlahan-Dualla			
1917	Boherlahan-Dualla			
1916	Boherlahan-Dualla			
1915	Thurles Sarsfields			
1914	Boherlahan-Dualla			
1913	Boherlahan-Dualla			
1912	Thurles Sarsfields			
1911	Thurles Sarsfields			
1910	Two-Mile-Borris			
1909	Thurles Sarsfields			
1908	Thurles Sarsfields			
1907	Thurles Sarsfields			
