= Holycross =

Village in County Tipperary, Ireland

Holycross Irish: Mainistir na Croiche
- Village
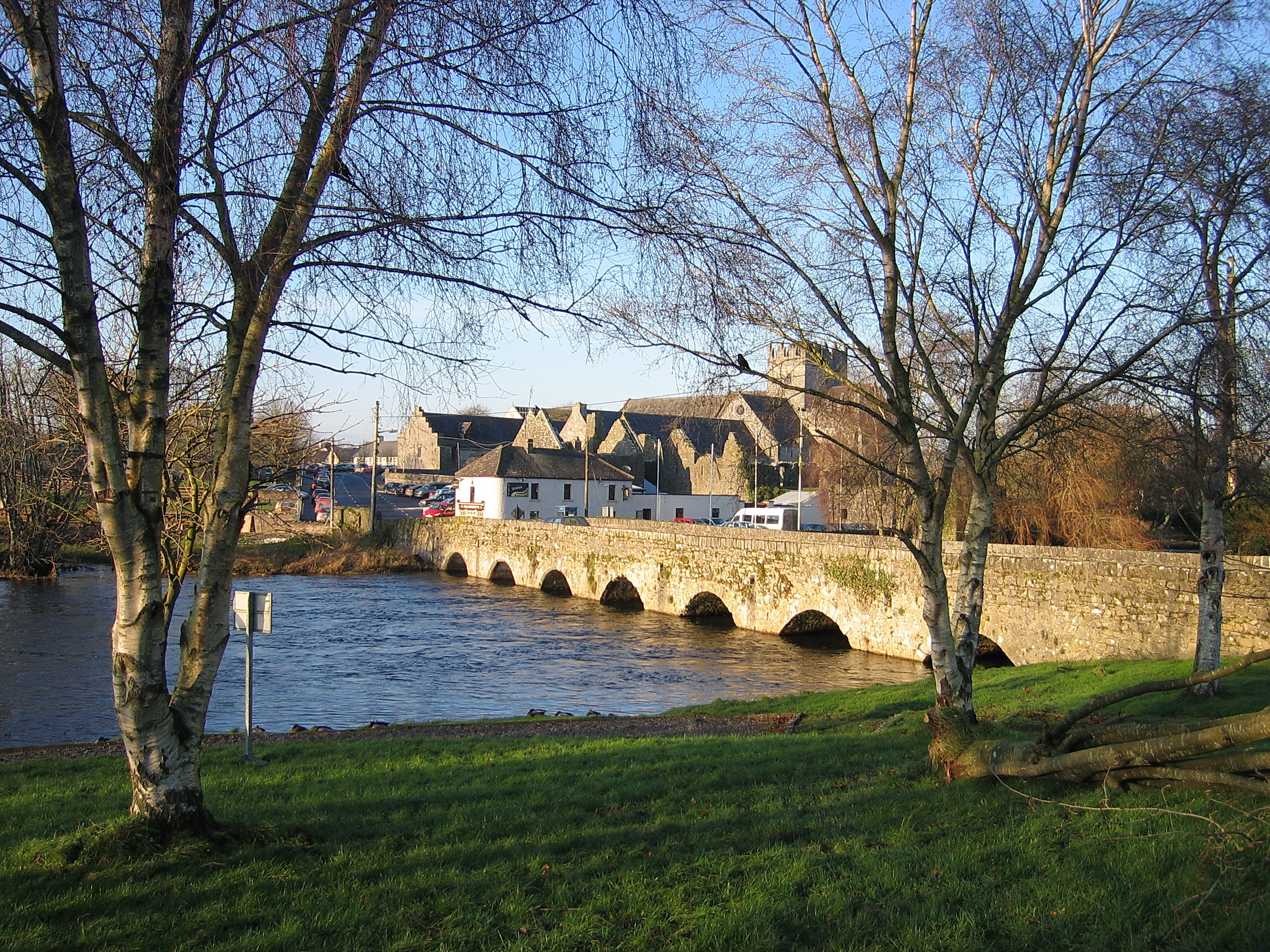
- Holycross Bridge and abbey

- Location within Ireland
- Coordinates: 52.639626°N 7.866597°W
- Country: Ireland
- Province: Munster
- County: Tipperary

Population (2016)
  - Total: 715

Holycross (Irish: Mainistir na Croiche) is a village and civil parish in County Tipperary, Ireland. It is one of 21 civil parishes in the barony of Eliogarty. The civil parish straddles the baronies of Eliogarty and of Middle Third. It is also an ecclesiastical parish in the Roman Catholic Archdiocese of Cashel and Emly.

The village developed around the Cistercian Holy Cross Abbey on the River Suir. Its population was 715 at the 2016 census.

== Transport ==
The Thurles to Clonmel via Cashel bus route serves Holycross. The nearest railway station is Thurles railway station at approximately 6 kilometres distance. By road, Thurles is 7 km to the north-east.

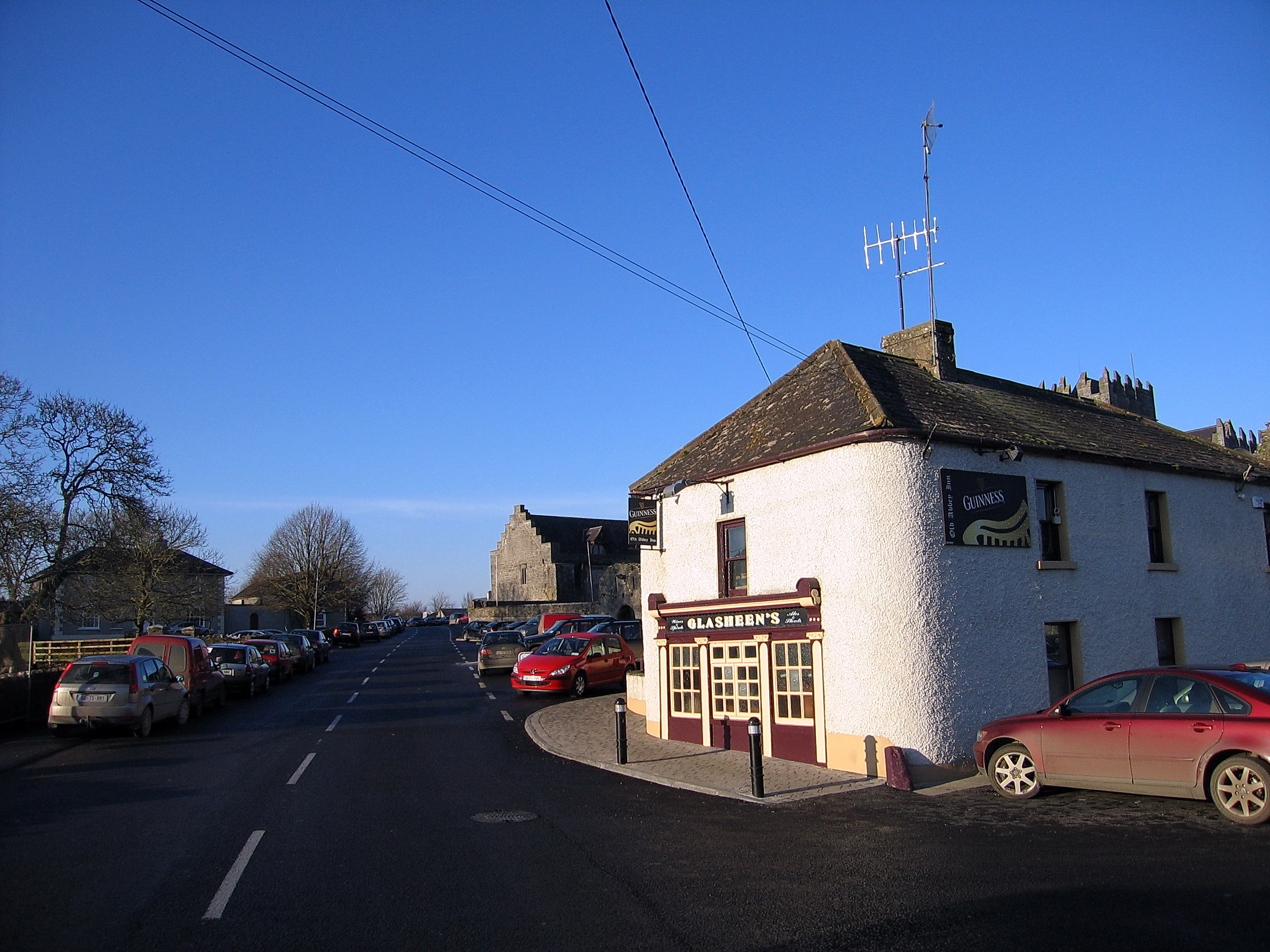
Village pub

== History ==
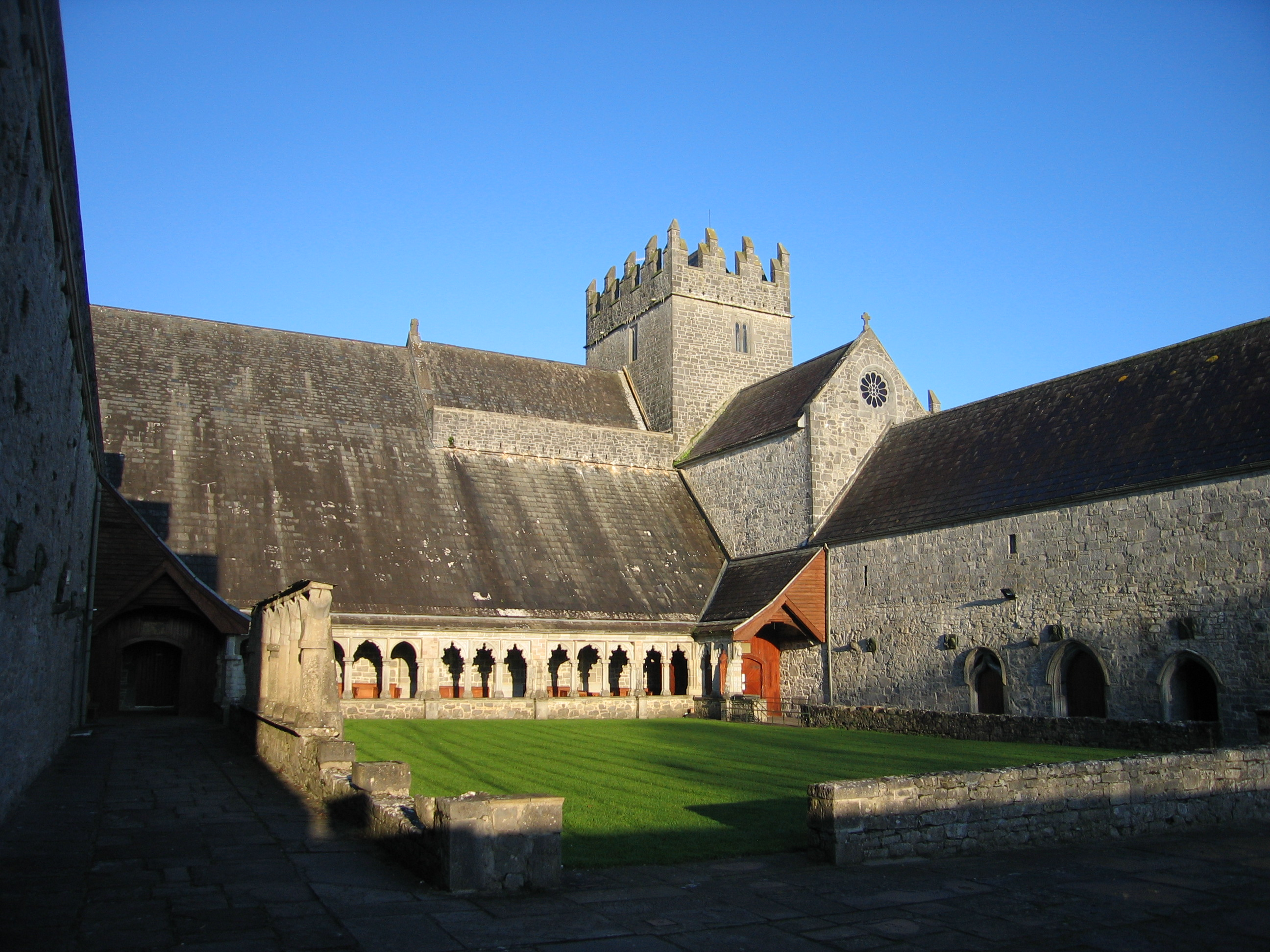
The Abbey

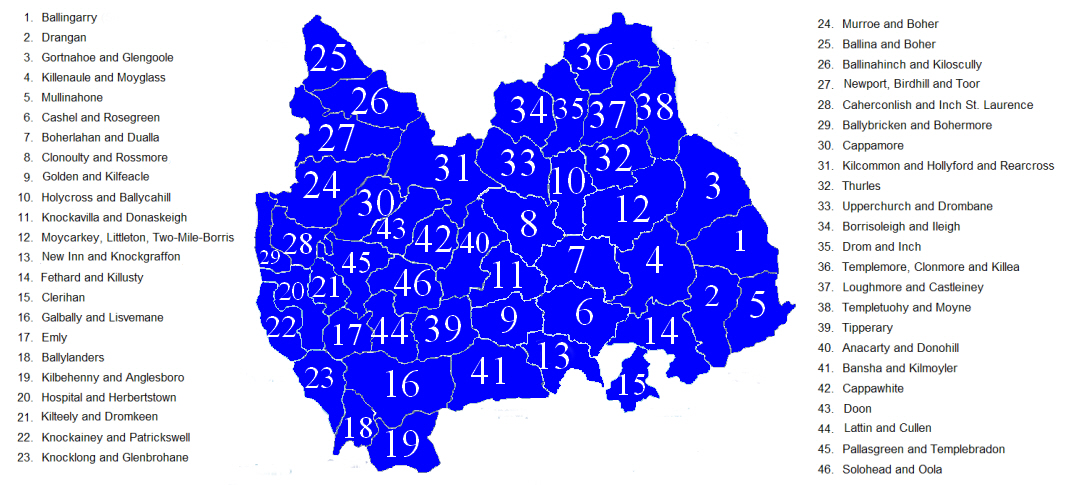
The parish, numbered 10, within the Archdiocese

Holy Cross Abbey was founded in 1180 by King Domnall Mór Ua Briain and was renovated and added to during the 15th century. It became a place of pilgrimage when a relic of the True Cross was presented to the Cistercian monks. The monastery was suppressed by King Henry VIII during the 16th century. The Abbey was abandoned circa 1650, fell into ruin. The late Dr. Thomas Morris, Archbishop of Cashel and Emly, inspired the reconstruction of the Abbey which was opened in 1975. The church of this Cistercian Abbey was re-roofed and restored to its former glory as one of the finest Irish 15th-century churches. The foundation in 1169 was originally by the Benedictine order.

== Relic ==
In 1975, on the restoration and reconsecration of the Abbey, an artifact, purportedly a relic of the True Cross, was reinstated after several centuries. The relic was stolen, along with a number of other items in October, 2011. It was recovered and returned by Gardaí in January 2012.

== Sport ==
Holycross–Ballycahill GAA is the local Gaelic Athletic Association club.

Holycross Football Club is a soccer club for juvenile and adult players located on the Cashel Road.

== See also ==
- List of civil parishes of County Tipperary
- List of towns in the Republic of Ireland
