= Tipperary county hurling team results (2010–2019) =

This article contains the results of the Tipperary county hurling team in the Championship during the 2010s. During this period they won 4 Munster titles in 2011, 2012, 2015, and 2016 and won 3 All Ireland titles in 2010, 2016, and 2019.

== 2010 ==
30 May 2010
Munster Quarter-final

Cork	3-15 - 0-14	Tipperary
P Horgan 2-2, B O'Connor 0-5, A Ó hAilpín 1-1, J Gardiner, C Naughton, N McCarthy 0-2 each, P O'Sullivan 0-1	Report	E Kelly 0-7, J O'Brien, L Corbett 0-2 each, B Maher, S Callanan, T Hammersley 0-1 each

Páirc Uí Chaoimh, Cork
Attendance: 36,827
Referee: B. Kelly (Westmeath)

3 July 2010
Qualifier Phase 1

Tipperary	3-24 - 0-19	Wexford
L Corbett 2-3, E Kelly 0-8, G Ryan 0-4, D Egan 1-0, D Young, N McGrath 0-3 each, P Maher 0-2, S Callanan 0-1	Report	H Kehoe, R Jacob, J Berry, C Farrell 0-3 each, P Atkinson, S Banville, T Mahon 0-2 each, D Stamp 0-1

Semple Stadium, Thurles
Referee: J McGrath (Westmeath)

18 July 2010
Qualifier Phase 3

Offaly	1-12 - 0-21	Tipperary
S Dooley 1-7, J Bergin 0-3, D Molloy, D Hayden 0-1 each	Report	E Kelly 0-11, G Ryan 0-3, L Corbett, B Maher 0-2 each, C O'Mahony, S McGrath, N McGrath 0-1 each

O'Moore Park, Portlaoise
Referee: J. Sexton (Cork)

25 July 2010
All Ireland Quarter-final

Galway	3-16 - 3-17	Tipperary
J Canning 1-5, D Hayes 1-3, E Ryan 1-1, G Farragher, K Hynes 0-2 each, D Burke, I Tannian, A Callanan 0-1 each	Report	E Kelly 1-7, G Ryan 1-2, S Callanan 1-0, L Corbett 0-3, B Maher 0-2, P Maher, N McGrath, J O'Brien 0-1 each

Croke Park, Dublin
Attendance: 27,864
Referee: J. Owens (Wexford)

15 August 2010
All Ireland Semi-final

Waterford	1-18 - 3-19	Tipperary
E Kelly 0-5, T Browne, J Mullane, K McGrath 0-3 each, E McGrath 1-0, R Foley, K Moran, S Molumphy, S Prendergast 0-1 each	Report	E Kelly 2-4, J O'Brien, N McGrath 0-6 each, L Corbett 1-2, S McGrath 0-1

Croke Park, Dublin
Attendance: 49,754
Referee: J. Sexton (Cork)

5 September 2010
All Ireland Final

Kilkenny	1-18 - 4-17	Tipperary
R Power 1-9, TJ Reid 0-4, M Rice, J Mulhall, H Shefflin, A Fogarty 0-1 each	Report	L Corbett 3-0, E Kelly 0-7, N McGrath 1-0, J O'Brien, B Maher, S Callanan 0-2 each, G Ryan, S Hennessy, B Cummins, B Dunne 0-1 each

Croke Park, Dublin
Attendance: 81,765
Referee: M. Wadding (Waterford)

== 2011 ==
29 May 2011
4:00pm
Munster Quarter-final

Tipperary	3-22 - 0-23	Cork
E Kelly 1-07 (0-05f), L Corbett 1-02, S Callanan 0-05, N McGrath 0-04 (2 sls), B Dunne 1-00, J O'Brien 0-02, Patrick Maher & J Woodlock 0-01 each.	Report	P Horgan 0-13 (10f), N McCarthy & B O'Connor 0-03 each, J Gardiner, P Cronin, C McCarthy & P O'Sullivan 0-01 each.

Semple Stadium, Thurles
Attendance: 31,231
Referee: B. Gavin (Offaly)

19 June 2011
4:00pm
Munster Semi-final

Clare	1-19 - 4-19	Tipperary
C McGrath (1-06, 4f), J Conlon (0-03), C McInerney (0-02); D McMahon (0-02), J Clancy (0-02); J McInerney (0-01, f), N O'Connell (0-01), F Lynch (0-01), D Honan (0-01),	Report	S Callanan (1-05), E Kelly (1-03, 2f), L Corbett (1-00), Patrick Maher (1-00), N McGrath (0-03), Padraic Maher (0-02); G Ryan (0-02), S McGrath (0-02), P Bourke (0-02).

Gaelic Grounds, Limerick
Attendance: 16,700
Referee: J Owens (Wexford)

10 July 2011
4:00pm
Munster Final

Tipperary	7-19 - 0-19	Waterford
L Corbett 4-4, E Kelly 2-6 (0-3f), S Callanan 1-00, J O’Brien 0-03, N McGrath (0-1sl), P Bourke 0-2 each, G Ryan, S Bourke 0-1 each.	Report	P Mahony 0-13 (0-12f), T Browne, S O’Sullivan, J Mullane, S Walsh, S Molumphy, M Shanahan 0-1 each.

Páirc Uí Chaoimh, Cork
Attendance: 36,654
Referee: B Gavin (Offaly)

14 August 2011
3:30pm
All Ireland Semi-final

Tipperary	1-19 - 0-18	Dublin
L Corbett (1-3), E Kelly (0-6, 2f, 3 '65), N McGrath (0-3, 1 sideline), Padraic Maher (0-2), G Ryan (0-2), P Bourke (0-1), S McGrath (0-1), S Callanan (0-1).	Report	P Ryan (0-9, 6f, 1 '65), P Kelly (0-1), J Boland (0-1), A McCrabbe (0-1), R O'Dwyer (0-1), L Rushe (0-1), D O'Callaghan (0-1), L Ryan (0-1), M O'Brien (0-1), S Ryan (0-1).

Croke Park, Dublin
Attendance: 43,562
Referee: C McAllister (Cork)

4 September 2011
3:30pm
All Ireland Final

Kilkenny	2-17 - 1-16	Tipperary
H Shefflin (0-7, 5f), R Hogan (1-1), M Fennelly (1-0), R Power (0-2), C Fennelly (0-2), E Larkin (0-2), M Rice (0-1), E Brennan (0-1), TJ Reid (0-1).	Report	E Kelly (0-8, 7f, 1 '65), P Bourke (1-0), N McGrath (0-3, 1 sideline), G Ryan (0-2), C O'Mahony (0-1), J O'Brien (0-1), B Dunne (0-1).

Croke Park, Dublin
Attendance: 81,214
Referee: B Gavin (Offaly)

== 2012 ==
27 May
Munster Quarter-final

Tipperary	2–20 – 1–19	Limerick
P Bourke 1–8 (0-5f, 0–1 65), B O’Meara 1–2, N McGrath 0–3, E Kelly 0-1f, T Stapleton 0–1, J O’Brien 0–1, S Bourke 0–1, S Callinan 0–1, S McGrath 0–1, C O’Brien 0–1.	Report	S Dowling 0–8 (4f), G Mulcahy 1–2, S Tobin 0–3, K Downes 0–2, C Allis 0–2, D Breen 0–1, D Hannon 0–1.

Semple Stadium, Thurles
Attendance: 22,068
Referee: B Kelly (Westmeath)

24 June
Munster Semi-final

Cork	0–24 – 1–22	Tipperary
P Horgan 0–11 (8f); P O’Sullivan 0–3; J Coughlan 0–3; C Lehane 0–2; P Cronin, C Naughton, D Kearney, C McCarthy, D Sweetnam, 0–1 each.	Report	P Bourke 0–12 (7f, 2 65s); N McGrath 1–4; B O’Meara 0–2; B Maher 0–2; Padraic Maher, G Ryan, 0–1 each.

Páirc Uí Chaoimh, Cork
Attendance: 32,568
Referee: B Gavin (Offaly)

15 July
Munster Final

Waterford	0–16 – 2–17	Tipperary
M Shanahan 0-08 (0-05f, 0-01 ‘65’), J Mullane 0-03, S Walsh 0-02, P Mahony, S Molumphy, E Kelly (0-01f) 0-01 each.	Report	J O’Brien 1-03, S Bourke 1-01, N McGrath, E Kelly (0-02f) 0-03 each, B O’Meara, P Bourke (0-02f) 0-02 each, Padraic Maher, S McGrath, M Cahill 0-01 each.

Páirc Uí Chaoimh, Cork
Attendance: 26,438
Referee: C McAllister (Cork)

19 August 2012
All Ireland Semi-final

Tipperary	1–15 – 4–24	Kilkenny
P Bourke 1–8 (4f, 4 65s); N McGrath 0–2; J O’Neill 0–2; C O’Mahony, S McGrath, J O’Brien, 0–1 each.	Report	H Shefflin 0–11 (9f, 1 65); TJ Reid 2–2; A Fogarty 1–3; E Larkin 1–0; R Power 0–3 (1f, 1 65); B Hogan, M Fennelly, M Rice, C Fennelly, C Buckley, 0–1 each.

Croke Park, Dublin
Referee: C McAllister (Cork)

== 2013 ==
9 June 2013
16:00
Munster Semi-final

Limerick	1-18 - 1-15	Tipperary
D Hannon 0-09 (5f, 1 65), S Tobin 1-01, D O'Grady 0-03, S Dowling 0-02 (1f), D Breen, J Ryan & N Moran 0-01 each.	Report	J O'Dwyer 1-03, S Callanan 0-04f, J O'Brien 0-03, E Kelly 0-02 (1f), B Maher, N McGrath & P Bourke 0-01 each.

Gaelic Grounds
Attendance: 19,507
Referee: B Gavin (Offaly)
6 July 2013
Qualifier Phase 2

Kilkenny	0-20 - 1-14	Tipperary
E Larkin 0-11 (8f), R Hogan, W Walsh 0-3 each; R Power 0-2, C Fennelly 0-1.	Report	E Kelly 0-5 (5f, 1 '65), L Corbett 1-0, J O'Dwyer 0-3, S Callanan 0-2, J O'Brien, N McGrath, K Bergin, J Woodlock 0-1 each.

Nowlan Park
Attendance: 23,307
Referee: B Gavin (Offaly)

== 2014 ==
1 June
16:15
Munster Semi-final

Tipperary	2–16 – 2–18	Limerick
G Ryan 1-2, Patrick Maher 1-0, S Callanan 0-5 (3f), J O’Dwyer 0-5 (1f), N McGrath, N O’Meara, L Corbett & D Maher 0-1 each.	Report D Gleeson; C Barrett, Pádraic Maher, M Cahill; J Barry, B Maher, C O’Mahony; K Bergin, S McGrath; G Ryan, N McGrath, N O’Meara; J O’Dwyer, S Callanan, Patrick Maher Subs: L Corbett for Barry (54), D Maher for O’Meara (62), C O’Brien for Cahill (65), S Bourke for O’Dwyer (68), T Stapleton for S McGrath (70).	S Dowling 2-9 (1-9f), D O’Grady & K Downes 0-2 each, S Hickey, P Browne, D Hannon, G Mulcahy & T Ryan 0-1 each.

Semple Stadium
Attendance: 24,962
Referee: B Kelly (Westmeath)

5 July
19:00
All Ireland Qualifier Round 1

Tipperary	3–25 – 4–13	Galway
S Callanan (3-08, 0-07f), J O’Dwyer (0-06), N McGrath (0-05), L Corbett (0-02), J Woodlock, Patrick Maher, K Bergin, S McGrath (0-01 each	Report D Gleeson; P Stapleton, Padraic Maher, M Cahill; B Maher, J Barry, C Barrett; R Maher, J Woodlock; G Ryan, Patrick Maher, N McGrath; J O’Dwyer, S Callanan, L Corbett; Subs: K Bergin R Maher (h.t.), S McGrath for G Ryan (69), J O’Brien for Corbett (70+2).	J Glynn (2-00), J Canning (0-05, 1sl), C Cooney (0-04f), J Flynn, David Burke (1-00 each), C Mannion (0-2), P Brehony, D Glennon (0-01 each

Semple Stadium
Attendance: 18,467
Referee: C Lyons (Cork)
12 July
19:00
All Ireland Qualifier Round 2

Tipperary	5-25 - 1-20	Offaly
S Callanan 2-10 (0-7f), L Corbett 2-2, Patrick Maher 1-1, K Bergin 0-4, D Maher 0-2, J Woodlock, J O'Dwyer, N McGrath, E Kelly, J Forde & T Stapleton 0-1 each	Report D Gleeson; C Barrett, Padraic Maher, M Cahill; J Barry, C O’Mahony, B Maher; K Bergin, J Woodlock; G Ryan, Patrick Maher, J O’Dwyer; N McGrath, S Callanan, L Corbett; Subs: D Maher for Ryan (temp 7-12), D Maher for Ryan (h.t.), T Stapleton for Barrett (47), E Kelly for O'Dwyer (59), S McGrath for Woodlock (60), J Forde for Patrick Maher (66)	B Carroll 0-13 (10f), C Egan 1-0, J Bergin 0-3 (1f, 1 65), C Parlon, S Dooley, S Ryan & D Currams 0-1 each

O'Moore Park
Attendance: 9,500
Referee: Alan Kelly (Galway)
27 July
16:00
All Ireland Quarter-final

Tipperary	2-23 - 0-16	Dublin
S Callanan (0-11, 7 frees, 2 ‘65’s); J O’Dwyer (2-2, 0-1 free); G Ryan (0-3); L Corbett (0-2); S McGrath, J Woodlock, Patrick Maher, N McGrath, S Bourke, (all 0-1)	Report D Gleeson; P Stapleton, Padraic Maher, C Barrett; B Maher, J Barry, S McGrath; K Bergin, J Woodlock; G Ryan, Patrick Maher, J O’Dwyer; N McGrath, S Callanan, L Corbett; Subs: D Maher for Patrick Maher (temp. 51-53), D Maher for N McGrath (59), J Forde for Ryan (61), E Kelly for Corbett (64), S Bourke for Patrick Maher (68), T Stapleton for Woodlock (70).	Alan McCrabbe 0-5 (0-5f), Conal Keaney, Paul Ryan (0-1f, 0-1 ’65) 0-2 each, Eamon Dillon, Liam Rushe (0-1f), Ryan O’Dwyer, Johnny McCaffrey, Danny Sutcliffe, David Treacy, David O’Callaghan 0-1 each

Semple Stadium
Attendance: 43,088
Referee: Brian Gavin (Offaly)
17 August
15:30
All Ireland Semi-final

Tipperary	2-18 - 1-11	Cork
S Callanan 2-4 (0-1f), J O'Dwyer 0-6, S McGrath, J Woodlock 0-3, N McGrath (0-2)	Report D Gleeson; P Stapleton, J Barry, C Barrett; K Bergin, B Maher, Padraic Maher; S McGrath, J Woodlock; G Ryan, Patrick Maher, N McGrath; J O’Dwyer, S Callanan, L Corbett; Subs: Maher for G Ryan (57); E Kelly for L Corbett (60); J Forde for Patrick Maher (inj, 65); M Cahill for S McGrath (inj, 65); C O’Brien for J Woodlock (69).	C Lehane (0-4); R O’Shea (1-0); A Nash, P Horgan (0-2, frees each); A Cadogan, S Harnedy, A Walsh (0-1 each).

Croke Park
Attendance: 68,728
Referee: J Owens (Wexford)
7 September 2014
15:30
All Ireland Final

Kilkenny	3-22 - 1-28	Tipperary
TJ Reid 1-8 (6f), R Power 2-1, R Hogan 0-6, E Larkin 0-2, C Fennelly, M Fennelly, C Fogarty, W Walsh, B Hogan 0-1 each.	Report	S Callanan 0-7 (2f), J O’Dwyer 0-7 (2f), Patrick Maher 1-1, N McGrath 0-4, S McGrath, L Corbett 0-2 each, J Woodlock, G Ryan, M Cahill, P Stapleton, J Forde 0-1 each.

Croke Park, Dublin
Attendance: 82,179
Referee: Barry Kelly

Kilkenny	Tipperary

KILKENNY:
1	Eoin Murphy
2	Paul Murphy
3	J. J. Delaney
4	Jackie Tyrrell
5	Joey Holden
6	Brian Hogan
7	Cillian Buckley
8	Richie Hogan
9	Conor Fogarty
10	Michael Fennelly
11	Colin Fennelly
12	T. J. Reid
13	Walter Walsh
14	Rickie Power
15	Eoin Larkin
Substitutes:
23	Aidan Fogarty for W. Walsh (48 mins)
19	Pádraig Walsh for J. Holden (61 mins)
22	Henry Shefflin for C. Fennelly (66 mins)
26	John Power for R. Hogan (71 mins)
Manager:
Brian Cody

TIPPERARY:
1	Darren Gleeson
2	Cathal Barrett
3	Pádraic Maher
4	Paddy Stapleton
5	Brendan Maher (captain)
6	James Barry
7	Kieran Bergin
8	Shane McGrath
9	James Woodlock
10	Gearóid Ryan
11	Patrick Maher
12	John O'Dwyer
13	Noel McGrath
14	Séamus Callanan
15	Lar Corbett
Substitutes:
Substitutes:
18	Michael Cahill for G. Ryan (49 mins)
21	Eoin Kelly for J. Woodlock (63 mins)
20	Jason Forde for S. McGrath (67 mins)
23	John O'Brien for S. Callinan (70 mins)
Manager:
Eamon O'Shea

Man of the Match:
Richie Hogan

Linesmen:
Colm Lyons (Corcaigh)
Brian Gavin (Uíbh Fhailí)

Sideline Official
Cathal McAllister (Corcaigh)

Umpires
Michael Coyle
Seamus O’Brien
Paddy Walsh
Paul Reville

27 September 2014
17:00
All Ireland Final Replay

Kilkenny	2-17 - 2-14	Tipperary
TJ Reid 0-5(5f), R Power 1-1 (1 ’65′), J Power 1-1, C Fennelly 0-3, R Hogan 0-2, M Fennelly 0-2, E Larkin 0-2, P Walsh 0-1	Report	S Callanan 2-5 (4f, 0-1 pen), J O’Dywer 0-3 (1 ’65′), S McGrath 0-3, N McGrath 0-2, B Maher 0-1

Croke Park, Dublin
Attendance: 81,753
Referee: Brian Gavin

Kilkenny	Tipperary

KILKENNY:
1	Eoin Murphy
2	Paul Murphy
3	J. J. Delaney
4	Jackie Tyrrell
5	Pádraig Walsh
6	Kieran Joyce
7	Cillian Buckley
8	Richie Hogan
9	Conor Fogarty
10	Michael Fennelly
11	Colin Fennelly
12	Eoin Larkin
13	Rickie Power
14	T. J. Reid
15	John Power
Substitutes:
22	Henry Shefflin for R.Hogan (58 mins)
26	Lester Ryan (Captain) for M Fennelly (67 mins)
Manager:
Brian Cody

TIPPERARY:
1	Darren Gleeson
2	Cathal Barrett
3	Pádraic Maher
4	Paddy Stapleton
5	Brendan Maher (captain)
6	James Barry
7	Kieran Bergin
8	Shane McGrath
9	James Woodlock
10	Gearóid Ryan
11	Patrick Maher
12	John O'Dwyer
13	Noel McGrath
14	Séamus Callanan
15	Lar Corbett
Substitutes:
18	Michael Cahill for S. McGrath (56 mins)
24	Conor O'Mahony for G.Ryan (64 mins)
17	Shane Bourke for L Corbett (65 mins)
17	Jason Forde for N McGrath (67 mins)
23	John O'Brien for J O’Dwyer (70 mins)
Manager:
Eamon O'Shea

Man of the Match:
Kieran Joyce

Linesmen:
James Owens (Loch Garman)
James McGrath (An Iarmhí)

Sideline Official
Alan Kelly (Gaillimh)

Umpires
Michael Gavin
David Gavin
William Flynn
PJ Lawlor

== 2015 ==
21 June
16:00
Munster Semi-final

Tipperary	4–23 – 1–16	Limerick
S Callanan 2-5 (0-2fs, 0-1 '65'), J O'Dwyer 0-7 (1 '65'), J Forde 1-3, Patrick Maher 0-3, M Breen 1-0, S McGrath 0-2, N O'Meara, J Woodlock, S Bourke 0-1 each.	Report Darren Gleeson; Paddy Stapleton, James Barry, Conor O'Brien; Kieran Bergin, Padraic Maher, Ronan Maher; James Woodlock, Shane McGrath; Jason Forde, Brendan Maher (capt), Patrick Maher; John O'Dwyer, Seamus Callanan, Niall O'Meara; Subs: Michael Cahill for Stapleton (35+1), Shane Bourke for O'Meara (60), Bill Maher for McGrath (69), Michael Breen for Callanan (70).	S Dowling 1-7(0-4fs, 1-0 pen, 0-2 '65s), D Hannon 0-3, G Mulcahy 0-2, D O'Grady, D Breen, G O'Mahony, S O'Brien 0-1 each.

Gaelic Grounds
Attendance: 31,488
Referee: B Gavin (Offaly)
12 July
16:00
Munster Final

Tipperary	0–21 – 0–16	Waterford
Seamus Callanan 0-6 (0-4f, 0-2 65), John O’Dwyer 0-5 (0-2f), Niall O’Meara 0-3, Jason Forde 0-2, Patrick Maher 0-2, Michael Breen 0-1, Lar Corbett 0-1, Shane Bourke 0-1	Report Darren Gleeson; Cathal Barrett, James Barry, Michael Breen; Kieran Bergin, Pádraic Maher, Ronan Maher; James Woodlock, Shane McGrath; Jason Forde, Brendan Maher, Patrick Maher; John O’Dwyer, Séamus Callanan, Niall O’Meara; Subs: Lar Corbett for Michael Breen (HT), Shane Bourke for Jason Forde (67), Conor O’Brien for Shane McGrath (70).	Maurice Shanahan 0-8 (0-3f, 0-2 65), Kevin Moran 0-2, Austin Gleeson 0-2, Shane Fives 0-2, Patrick Curran 0-1, Colin Dunford 0-1

Semple Stadium
Attendance: 43,084
Referee: James Owens (Wexford)
16 August
16:00
All Ireland Semi-Final

Tipperary	3–16 – 0–26	Galway
S Callanan 3-9 (2f, 0-1 pen, 1 '65'), J O'Dwyer 0-2 (1f), J Forde 0-1, B Maher 0-1, Patrick Maher 0-1, C O'Mahony 0-1, N McGrath 0-1	Report Darren Gleeson; Cathal Barrett, James Barry, Connor O'Brien; Ronan Maher, Pádraic Maher, Kieran Bergin; James Woodlock, Shane McGrath; Jason Forde, Brendan Maher, Patrick Maher; John O’Dwyer, Séamus Callanan, Niall O’Meara; Subs: S Bourke for Forde (HT), L Corbett for McGrath (56), N McGrath (0-1) for Bourke (62), C O'Mahony (0-1) for Woodlock (63), M Breen for R Maher (70).	J Canning (0-10, 6 frees, 1 65, 1 sideline); C Mannion, J Flynn (1 free) (0-5 each); David Burke, J Whelan (0-2 each); A Smith, S Moloney (0-1 each).

Croke Park
Attendance: 58,495
Referee: B Kelly (Westmeath

== 2016 ==
22 May
16:00
Munster Quarter-Final

Tipperary	0–22 – 0–13	Cork
S Callanan 0-8 (4f), J O'Dwyer 0-7 (2f, 1'65'), N McGrath 0-2, Padraic Maher, B Maher, J McGrath, J Forde, K Bergin 0-1 each.	Report Gleeson; C Barrett, J Barry, M Cahill; S Kennedy, R Maher, Padraic Maher; B Maher, M Breen; S Curran, D McCormack, N McGrath; J O'Dwyer, S Callanan, J McGrath; Subs: J Forde for N McGrath (52), Patrick Maher for Curran (55), N O'Meara for O'Dwyer (64), K Bergin for Breen (64).	P Horgan 0-4 (4f), A Cadogan 0-3, C Lehane 0-2 (1f), B Lawton, C Murphy, S Harnedy, L O'Farrell 0-1 each.

Semple Stadium
Attendance: 29,114
Referee: B Kelly (Westmeath)
19 June
16:00
Munster Semi-Final

Tipperary	3-12 - 1-16	Limerick
S Callanan 1-6 (3fs, 2 '65), N McGrath 0-3, M Breen 2-1, J McGrath 0-1, P Maher 0-1.	Report D Gleeson; C Barrett, J Barry, M Cahill; S Kennedy, R Maher, Pádraic Maher; B Maher (c), M Breen; N McGrath, Patrick Maher, D McCormack; J O’Dwyer, S Callanan, J McGrath; Subs: N O’Meara for D McCormack (60), D Maher for R Maher (inj 64), J Forde for Patrick Maher (69), K Bergin for B Maher, D Quinn for M Breen (both 70+1); Sent off: J. O’Dwyer (straight, 14).	S Dowling 0-9 (8fs), T Morrissey 1-0, D Hannon 0-2, B Nash, J Ryan, G Hegarty, C Lynch and J Fitzgibbon 0-1 each

Semple Stadium
Attendance: 25,531
Referee: James McGrath (Westmeath)
10 July
16:00
Munster Final

Tipperary	5-19 - 0-13	Waterford
S. Callanan (1-11, 8 frees, 1 65); J. McGrath (3-2, 1-0 pen); M. Breen (1-1); Pádraic Maher, N. McGrath, Patrick Maher, J. Forde, A. McCormack (0-1 each)	Report D. Gleeson; C. Barrett, J. Barry, M. Cahill; S. Kennedy, R. Maher, Pádraic Maher; B. Maher (c), M. Breen; D. McCormack, Patrick Maher, N. McGrath; J. McGrath, S. Callanan, N. O’Meara. Subs:J. Forde for N. O’Meara (51), S. Curran for D. McCormack (56), K. Bergin for B. Maher (61), A. McCormack for N. McGrath (66), D. Maher for R. Maher (67).	Pauric Mahony (0-6, 4 frees); P. Curran (0-5, 3 frees); A. Gleeson (0-2, sidelines)

Gaelic Grounds
Attendance: 26,508
Referee: Brian Gavin (Offaly)
14 August
15:30
All Ireland Semi-Final

Tipperary	2-19 - 2-18	Galway
Seamus Callanan 0-9 (0-8f, 0-1 ’65), John McGrath 1-1, John O’Dwyer 1-0, Noel McGrath, Michael Breen 0-3 each, Ronan Maher, Padraic Maher, Brendan Maher 0-1 each.	Report D. Gleeson; C. Barrett, J. Barry, M. Cahill; S. Kennedy, R. Maher, Pádraic Maher; B. Maher (c), M. Breen; D. McCormack, Patrick Maher, N. McGrath; J. McGrath, S. Callanan, N. O’Meara. Subs:J O'Dwyer for O'Meara (45), J Forde for N McGrath (57), S Curran for Breen (68), T Hamill for Kennedy (71).	Conor Cooney 1-6 (0-4f), Joe Canning 0-5 (0-3f, 0-1 ’65), Joseph Cooney 1-1, Conor Whelan, Jason Flynn 0-2 each, Shane Maloney, David Burke 0-1 each.

Croke Park
Attendance: 54,227
Referee: B Kelly (Westmeath)
4 September
15:30
All Ireland Final

Tipperary	2-29 - 2-20	Kilkenny
Seamus Callanan 0-13 (3f, ’65), John O’Dwyer 1-5 (1 sl, 1f), John McGrath 1-3, Patrick Maher 0-2, Jason Forde 0-2, Padraic Maher 0-1, Séamus Kennedy 0-1, Dan McCormack 0-1, Noel McGrath 0-1	Report D. Gleeson; C. Barrett, J. Barry, M. Cahill; S. Kennedy, R. Maher, Pádraic Maher; B. Maher (c), M. Breen; D. McCormack, Patrick Maher, N. McGrath; J O’Dwyer, S. Callanan, J. McGrath; Subs:Jason Forde for M Breen (45), Aidan McCormack for Dan McCormack (62), Donagh Maher for Michael Cahill (65), Kieran Bergin for Noel McGrath (70), Tomás Hamill for Séamus Kennedy (73)	TJ Reid 0-11 (10f, 1’65), Kevin Kelly 1-2, Richie Hogan 1-1, Padraig Walsh 0-2, Eoin Larkin 0-2, Cillian Buckley 0-1, Walter Walsh 0-1

Croke Park
Attendance: 82,016
Referee: Brian Gavin (Offaly)

== 2017 ==
21 May
16:00
Munster Quarter-Final

Tipperary	1–26 – 2–27	Cork
S. Callanan (4 frees); M. Breen (0-6 each); J. McGrath (1-2); D. McCormack (0-3); John O’Dwyer (1 sideline), N. McGrath, B. Maher (0-2 each); S. Curran, Pádraic Maher, N. O’Meara (0-1 each).	Report D. Gleeson; C. Barrett J. Barry J. O’Keeffe; S. Kennedy R. Maher Pádraic Maher (c); B. Maher M. Breen; D. McCormack S. Curran N. McGrath; John O’Dwyer S. Callanan J. McGrath; Subs: N. O’Meara for S. Curran (51), Joe O’Dwyer for S. Kennedy (58), A. Flynn for C. Barrett (inj 64).	C. Lehane (0-10, 4 frees, 1 65); S. Kingston (1-4); P. Horgan (0-4); M. Cahalane (1-0); L. Meade, A. Cadogan (0-3 each); S. Harnedy (0-2); L. O’Farrell (0-1)

Semple Stadium
Attendance: 30,013
Referee: J. Owens (Wexford)
1 July
17:00
All Ireland Qualifiers Round 1

Tipperary	2–18 – 0–15	Westmeath
John O’Dwyer 1-3 (1f), Seamus Callanan 0-5 (4fs, 165), John McGrath 1-1, Noel McGrath, Niall O’Meara & Jason Forde 0-2 each, Ronan Maher, Brendan Maher and Patrick Maher 0-1 each	Report Daragh Mooney; James Barry, Tomás Hamill, Donagh Maher; Joe O’Dwyer, Ronan Maher, Pádraic Maher; Brendan Maher, Noel McGrath; Dan McCormack, Patrick Maher, Michael Breen; John O’Dwyer, Seamus Callanan, Niall O’Meara; Subs: Jason Forde for Breen (44), John McGrath for Callanan (45), Aidan McCormack for O’Meara (60), Steven O’Brien for Patrick Maher (64) Tom Fox for Pádraic Maher (68).	Allan Devine 0-6 (4fs), Paul Greville (1f) and Killian Doyle 0-2 each, Aonghus Clarke, Robbie Greville, Derek McNicholas, Niall O’Brien and Cormac Boyle 0-1 each

Semple Stadium
Attendance: 6,893
Referee: Paud O’Dwyer (Carlow)
8 July
17:00
All Ireland Qualifiers Round 2

Tipperary	6–26 – 1–19	Dublin
Seamus Callanan 3-11 (0-7f), John McGrath 2-2, John O’Dwyer, Jason Forde 0-4 each, Michael Breen 1-0, Steven O’Brien 0-2, Padraic Maher, Brendan Maher, Dan McCormack 0-1 each.	Report D Gleeson; D Maher, T Hamill, J Barry; Joe O’Dwyer, R Maher, Pádraic Maher; B Maher, M Breen; J Forde, Patrick Maher, D McCormack; John O’Dwyer, S Callanan, J McGrath; Subs: S Kennedy for R Maher (45), N McGrath for B Maher (49), S O’Brien for D McCormack (49), M Cahill for D Maher (56), T Fox for Pádraic Maher (66).	David Treacy 0-11 (0-8f), Cian O’Sullivan 1-1, Liam Rushe, Ryan O’Dwyer 0-2 each, Chris Crummey, David O’Callaghan, Rian McBride 0-1 each.

Semple Stadium
Attendance: 33,181
Referee: A Kelly (Galway)
22 July
15:00
All Ireland Quarter Final

Tipperary	0–28 – 3–16	Clare
S. Callanan (0-3 frees)(0-7); J. McGrath (0-6); J. O’Dwyer (0-1 free, N. McGrath (0-4 each); P. Maher, M. Breen (0-2 each); B. Maher (free), S. O’Brien, J. Forde (0-1 each)	Report D. Mooney; D Maher, T. Hamill, J. Barry; S. Kennedy, R Maher, P Maher (c); B. Maher, M. Breen; N. McGrath, Patrick Maher, D. McCormack; J. O’Dwyer, S. Callanan, J. McGrath; Subs: S. O’Brien for Barry (44); J. Forde for Breen (60); S. O’Brien for Callanan (68)	A. Cunningham (2-0), T. Kelly (0-4 frees)(0-6); S. O’Donnell (1-2); C. McGrath, D. Reidy (frees)(0-2 each); P. Duggan, C. McInerney, C. Galvin, J. Shanahan (0-1 each)

Páirc Uí Chaoimh
Attendance: 28,567
Referee: Colm Lyons (Cork)
6 August
16:00
All Ireland Semi-Final

Tipperary	1–18 – 0–22	Galway
S. Callanan (0-5, 3 frees); J. McGrath (1-1); J.O’Dwyer, B. Maher (1 free) (0-3 each); Pádraic Maher, N. McGrath (0-2 each); S. Kennedy, J. Forde (0-1 each)	Report D. Gleeson; D. Maher, J. Barry, M. Cahill; S. Kennedy, R. Maher, Pádraic Maher (c); B. Maher, D. McCormack; M. Breen, N. McGrath, Patrick Maher; J. O’Dwyer, S. Callanan, J. McGrath; Subs: S. Curran for D. McCormack (temp, 7-11), J. Forde for M. Breen (34), N. O’Meara for J. Forde (61).	J. Canning (0-11, 6 frees, 1 sideline, 1 65); C. Whelan (0-4); C. Cooney, J. Coen, J. Cooney (free) (0-2 each); C. Mannion (0-1).

Croke Park
Attendance: 68,184
Referee: B Kelly (Westmeath)

== 2018 ==
20 May
14:00
Munster Group Stage Round 1

Limerick	1–23 – 2–14	Tipperary
A Gillane 0-8 (6f); G Mulcahy 0-4; B Murphy 1-0; D Byrnes 0-3 (2f, 1'65'); C Lynch, G Hegarty, T Morrissey 0-2 each; S Flanagan, D O'Donovan 0-1 each	Report Brian Hogan; Alan Flynn, Séamus Kennedy, Donagh Maher; Barry Heffernan, Padraic Maher (c), Ronan Maher; Willie Connors, Billy McCarthy; Dan McCormack, Noel McGrath, Sean Curran; John O’Dwyer, Jason Forde, John McGrath; Subs: Sean O’Brien for Donagh Maher (43), Brendan Maher for Willie Connors (49), Seamus Callanan for Sean Curran (52), Patrick Maher for Billy McCarthy (64)	J Forde 1-9 (8f); D McCormack 1-0; J McGrath, N McGrath 0-2 each; J O'Dwyer 0-1

Gaelic Grounds, Limerick
Referee: James McGrath (Westmeath)
27 May
14:00
Munster Group Stage Round 2

Cork	1–23 – 2-20	Tipperary
Shane Kingston 1-5, Seamus Harnedy, Patrick Horgan (0-3f) 0-5 each, Daniel Kearney 0-4, Conor Lehane, Bill Cooper 0-2 each.	Report B. Hogan; S. O’Brien, S. Kennedy, M. Cahill; Joe. O’Dwyer, R. Maher, Padraic Maher (c); B. Maher, B. McCarthy; D. McCormack, N. McGrath, Patrick Maher, S. Callanan, J. Forde, J. McGrath; Subs: P. Feehan for Padraic Maher (blood 12-14); J. O’Dwyer for Patrick Maher (HT); J. Morris for Callanan and G. Browne for McCarthy (71).	Jason Forde 1-6 (0-4f, 0-2 ’65), Noel McGrath 1-3, John McGrath 0-5, Brendan Maher, Billy McCarthy, Patrick Maher, Seamus Callanan, John O’Dwyer, Jake Morris 0-1 each

Semple Stadium, Thurles
Referee: John Keenan (Wicklow)
3 June
16:00
Munster Group Stage Round 3

Waterford	2–22 – 2-22	Tipperary
Pauric Mahony 1-8 (0-5f), Tom Devine 1-2, DJ Foran, Jamie Barron 0-3 each, Patrick Curran 0-2, Philip Mahony, Stephen Bennett, Tommy Ryan, Jake Dillon 0-1 each.	Report B. Hogan; S. O’Brien, S. Kennedy, M. Cahill; Joe O’Dwyer, Pádraic Maher, B. Maher; R. Maher, B. McCarthy; D. McCormack, J. Forde, John O’Dwyer; N. McGrath, S. Callanan, J. McGrath; Subs: Patrick Maher for J. O’Dwyer (47); C. Barrett for N. McGrath (55); J. Morris for J. McGrath (59); S. Curran for D. McCormack (60); W. Connors for B. McCarthy (68).	Jason Forde 1-14 (1-12f), Ronan Maher 0-3, Patrick Maher 1-0, Seamus Callanan 0-2, Noel McGrath, Billy McCarthy, Cathal Barrett 0-1 each.

Gaelic Grounds, Limerick
Referee: Alan Kelly (Galway)
10 June
14:00
Munster Group Stage Round 4

Clare	1–23 – 1-21	Tipperary
P Duggan 0-15 (13f). P Collins 0-3, I Galvin 1-0, T Kelly, J Conlon 0-2 each, J Browne 0-1.	Report B Hogan; S O'Brien, S Kennedy, D Maher; Joe O'Dwyer, Padraic Maher (c), B Maher; R Maher, C Barrett; D McCormack, Patrick Maher, B McCarthy; J McGrath, J Forde, S Callanan; Subs: N McGrath for McCormack (10), J Morris for Patrick Maher (60), A Flynn for O'Dwyer (60), W Connots for B Maher (68), J O'Dwyer for J McGrath (73).	J Forde 0-10 (8f, 1'65'), B McCarthy 1-0, J McGrath 0-3, S Callanan, N McGrath 0-2 each, R Maher, Padraic Maher, Patrick Maher, C Barrett 0-1 each.

Semple Stadium, Thurles
Referee: Alan Kelly (Galway)

== 2019 ==
12 May
16:00
Munster Round 1

Cork	1–24 – 2–28	Tipperary
P. Horgan (0-14, 10 frees); S. Harnedy (1-2); C. Lehane, S. Kingston (0-3 each); R. O’Flynn, T. O’Mahony (0-1 each).	Report Brian Hogan; C. Barrett, J. Barry, S. O’Brien; B. Maher, Pádraic Maher, R. Maher; N. McGrath, M. Breen; N. O’Meara, J. O’Dwyer, Patrick Maher; J. McGrath, S. Callanan (c), J. Forde; Subs: D. McCormack for M. Breen (49); J. Morris for J. Forde (55); W. Connors for N. O’Meara (inj 63); M. Kehoe for Patrick Maher (66); C. Darcy for N. McGrath (70).	S. Callanan (1-4); J. O’Dwyer (0-7); J. Forde (0-5, 3 frees), J. McGrath (1-1); N. McGrath (0-4, 1 65); B. Maher (0-2), M. Breen, Pádraic Maher, N. O’Meara, Patrick Maher, R. Maher (0-1 each).

Páirc Uí Chaoimh, Cork
Referee: S Cleere (Kilkenny)
19 May
14:00
Munster Round 2

Tipperary	2–30 – 0–18	Waterford
J Forde 1-9 (0-3 frees, 0-1 line 'cut'), M Breen 0-6, J McGrath 0-5, J O'Dwyer 0-4, S Callanan 1-0, N McGrath 0-2 (0-1 free), R Maher 0-2 (0-1 line 'cut'), B Heffernan and J Morris 0-1 each.	Report Brian Hogan; C Barrett, J Barry, R Maher; B Maher, Padraic Maher, A Flynn; N McGrath, M Breen; J Forde, Patrick Maher, D McCormack; J O'Dwyer, S Callanan (c), J McGrath; Subs: B Heffernan for B Maher (half-time), R Byrne for McCormack (48 mins), W Connor for N McGrath (60 mins), J Morris for O'Dwyer (66 mins), G Browne for Patrick Maher (70 mins).	Pauric Mahony 0-9 (0-7 frees), T Ryan 0-3, A Glesson 0-2, T de Burca, B O'Halloran, J Barron and Stephen Bennett 0-1 each.

Semple Stadium, Thurles
Referee: J Keenan (Wicklow)
2 June
16:00
Munster Round 3

Clare	0–17 – 3–21	Tipperary
P. Duggan (0-9, 8 frees); T. Kelly (0-3, 2 frees); P. Collins; D. Ryan, D. Fitzgerald, S. Golden, J. McCarthy (0-1 each).	Report Brian Hogan; A. Flynn, B. Heffernan, C. Barrett; R. Maher, B. Maher, Pádraic Maher; N. McGrath, M. Breen; D. McCormack, J. O’Dwyer, Patrick Maher; J. McGrath, S. Callanan (c), J. Forde; Subs:W. Connors for M. Breen (56); J. Morris for J.O’Dwyer (61); R. Byrne for R. Maher (66); G. Browne for D. McCormack (69)	J. McGrath (0-6); J. Forde (0-6, frees); S. Callanan (1-3); N. McGrath, Patrick Maher (1-2 each); J. O’Dwyer, B. Maher (0-1 each).

Cusack Park, Ennis
Referee: Alan Kelly (Galway)
16 June
14:00
Munster Round 4

Tipperary	1–22 – 0–21	Limerick
Jason Forde 0-8 (4fs, 2 sideline cuts), Seamus Callanan 1-4, Padraic Maher, John McGrath, Noel McGrath (1 free) 0-2 each, Brendan Maher, Michael Breen, Jake Morris, John O’Dwyer 0-1 each	Report Brian Hogan; Sean O’Brien, James Barry, Cathal Barrett; Brendan Maher, Padraic Maher, Ronan Maher; Michael Breen, Noel McGrath; Jason Forde, John O’Dwyer, Patrick Maher; John McGrath, Seamus Callanan (c), Jake Morris; Subs: Alan Flynn for Barrett (33 inj), Dan McCormack for Patrick Maher (35 inj), Robert Byrne for Breen (47), Mark Kehoe for Morris (63), Willie Connors for J McGrath (68).	Aaron Gillane 0-12 (10fs); Tom Morrissey, Diarmuid Byrnes (2 65s) 0-3 each, Shane Dowling, Graeme Mulachy, Cian Lynch 0-1 each

Semple Stadium, Thurles
Referee: Sean Cleere (Kilkenny)
30 June
14:00
Munster Final

Limerick	2–26 – 2–14	Tipperary
Peter Casey 1-5, Kyle Hayes 1-2, Tom Morrissey, Aaron Gillane (0-3f) 0-4 each, Gearoid Hegarty, Diarmaid Byrnes (0-3f) 0-3 each, Graeme Mulcahy 0-2, Barry Nash 0-1.	Report Brian Hogan; S Kennedy, J Barry, S O'Brien; B Maher, Padraic Maher, R Maher; M Breen, N McGrath; J Forde, J O'Dwyer, D McCormack; J McGrath, S Callanan (c), J Morris; Subs: N O'Meara for Breen (half-time), R Byrne for N McGrath (54 mins), J Cahill for O'Dwyer (61 mins), B Heffernan for Barry (63 mins), M Kehoe for J McGrath (65 mins).	Jason Forde 0-6 (0-3f), Séamus Callanan 1-1, John McGrath 1-0, Ronan Maher 0-2, Noel McGrath (0-1f), Dan McCormack, John O’Dwyer, Jake Morris, Jerome Cahill 0-1 each.

Gaelic Grounds, Limerick
Referee: Paud O’Dwyer (Carlow)
14 July
16:00
All-Ireland Quarter-final

Tipperary	2–25 – 1–18	Laois
Jason Forde 1-12 (1-0 pen, 0-8f, 0-1 65), Seamus Callanan 1-2, Noel McGrath 0-3, Ronan Maher and Ger Browne 0-2 each, Padraic Maher, John McGrath, Alan Flynn, Barry Heffernan 0-1 each.	Report Brian Hogan; C Barrett, J Barry, A Flynn; B Maher, P Maher, R Maher; N McGrath, G Browne; D McCormack, J O’Dwyer, N O’Meara; J Forde, S Callanan (c), J McGrath; Subs: M Breen for Flynn (48 mins); M Kehoe for O’Dwyer (54); J Cahill for Browne (57); B Heffernan for Barry (62); J Morris for O’Meara (68).	Mark Kavanagh 0-11 (0-11f), Ross King 1-0, Aaron Dunphy and Jack Kelly 0-2, John Lennon, Paddy Purcell and Willie Dunphy 0-1 each.

Croke Park, Dublin
Referee: Colm Lyons (Cork)
28 July
15:30
All-Ireland Semi-final

Tipperary	1–28 – 3–20	Wexford
Jason Forde 0-12 (0-8f, 0-2 ’65), Séamus Callanan 1-2, Noel McGrath 0-4, John O’Dwyer 0-3, Ronan Maher 0-2, Michael Breen, Ger Browne, Willie Connors, Mark Kehoe, Jake Morris 0-1 each.	Report Brian Hogan; Cathal Barrett, Barry Heffernan, Ronan Maher; Brendan Maher, Padraic Maher, Seamus Kennedy; Noel McGrath, Michael Breen; Dan McCormack, John O’Dwyer, Niall O’Meara; Jason Forde, Seamus Callanan (c), John McGrath; Subs: Willie Connors for Dan McCormack (52), Ger Browne for Michael Breen (54), Mark Kehoe for Niall O’Meara (56), Alan Flynn for Barry Heffernan (65), Jake Morris for John O’Dwyer (67)	Lee Chin 1-7 (0-6f, 0-1 ’65), Conor McDonald 2-1, Rory O’Connor 0-3, Diarmuid O’Keeffe, Paul Morris 0-2 each, Liam Ryan, Paudie Foley, Kevin Foley, Liam Óg McGovern, Jack O’Connor 0-1 each.

Croke Park, Dublin
Referee: Seán Cleere (Kilkenny)
18 August
15:30
All-Ireland Final

Tipperary	3–25 – 0–20	Kilkenny
Jason Forde 0-8 (0-5f, 0-2 ‘65), Séamus Callanan (0-1f), John O’Dwyer 1-2 each, Niall O’Meara 1-0, John McGrath 0-3, Noel McGrath (0-1f), Séamus Kennedy, Willie Connors 0-2 each, Michael Breen, Ger Browne, Jake Morris, Mark Kehoe 0-1 each.	Report Brian Hogan; Cathal Barrett, Ronan Maher, Barry Heffernan; Seamus Kennedy, Brendan Maher, Padraic Maher; Noel McGrath, Michael Breen; Dan McCormack, Niall O’Meara, John McGrath; Callanan (c), John O’Dwyer, Jason Forde; Subs: Mark Kehoe for O’Meara (51), Willie Connors for McCormack (57), Jake Morris for Forde (60), Sean O’Brien for Barrett (61), Ger Browne for Breen (64).	TJ Reid 0-11 (0-10f), John Donnelly 0-3, Billy Ryan 0-2, Pádraig Walsh, Richie Hogan, Colin Fennelly, Walter Walsh 0-1 each.

Croke Park, Dublin
Referee: James Owens (Wexford)
