= 2014 Tipperary county hurling team season =

Tipperary county hurling team
2014 season
Manager	Eamon O'Shea
Captain	Brendan Maher
All-Ireland SHC	Finalists
Munster SHC	Semi-Finalists
National League	Finalists
Waterford Crystal Cup	Winners
Top scorer Championship	Séamus Callanan (9-50)
Highest SHC attendance	82,179 (v Kilkenny 7 September)
Lowest SHC attendance	9,500 (v Offaly 12 July)
Colours

Eamon O'Shea's 2014 season was his second year as manager of the Tipperary senior hurling team.

In October 2013, Brendan Maher was named as the new Tipperary captain for 2014. A statement from the County board read as follows "Tipperary County Board is pleased to announce that the senior hurling management team have appointed Brendan Maher (Borris-Ileigh) as captain and Noel McGrath (Loughmore Castleiney) as vice captain of the Tipperary senior hurling team for 2014."

In December 2013, Skoda Ireland announced the extension of its sponsorship of Tipperary GAA another year. The new 2014 Tipperary strip was also unveiled which features an 1884 motif to commemorate 130 years of Tipperary GAA.

On 7 February Tipperary won the Waterford Crystal Cup after a 4–22 to 3–11 win against Clare in the final.

On 27 September, Tipperary were beaten by Kilkenny in the All-Ireland Final on a 2–17 to 2-14 scoreline after the initial match had finished in a draw three weeks earlier.

It was Kilkenny's 35th title and also the fifth time that they have beaten Tipperary in the last six years of the Championship.

== 2014 senior hurling management team ==
Name	Position	Club
Eamon O'Shea	Manager	Kilruane McDonaghs
Michael Ryan	Assistant Manager	Upperchurch-Drombane
Paudie O’Neill	Coach	St Mary's
Kieran McGeeney	Back room team	Mullaghbawn
Micheál Donoghue	Statistician	Clarinbridge

=== 2014 Squad ===
The following players made their senior debut in 2014.

- Niall O'Meara
- Cathal Barrett
- Denis Maher
- Conor Kenny
- James Barry
- Michael Breen
- Ronan Maher
- Liam McGrath

Number	Player	Position	Local Club
2	Conor O'Brien	Right corner back	Eire Óg, Annacarty
3	Paul Curran	Full back	Mullinahone
4	Mickey Cahill	Left corner back	Thurles Sarsfields
5	Thomas Stapleton	Right half back	Templederry
6	Conor O'Mahoney	Centre half back	Newport
7	Pádraic Maher	Left half back	Thurles Sarsfields
8	Brendan Maher(C)	Midfield	Borris-Ileigh
9	Shane McGrath	Midfield	Ballinahinch
10	Pa Bourke	Right half forward	Thurles Sarsfields
11	Patrick 'Bonner' Maher	Centre half forward	Lorrha-Dorrha
12	Lar Corbett	Left half forward	Thurles Sarsfields
13	Brian O'Meara	Right corner forward	Kilruane MacDonagh's
14	John O'Brien	Full forward	Toomevara
15	Noel McGrath	Left corner forward	Loughmore-Castleiney
16	Darren Gleeson	Goalkeeper	Portroe
17	Shane Bourke	Left corner forward	J.K. Bracken's
18	Séamus Callanan	Right half forward	Drom-Inch
19	Eoin Kelly	Full forward	Mullinahone
20	Donagh Maher	Right corner back	Burgess
21	Shane Maher	Right half back	Burgess
22	John O'Keeffe	Left half back	Clonoulty-Rossmore
23	John O'Neill	Left corner forward	Clonoulty-Rossmore
24	Gearóid Ryan	Left half forward	Templederry
25	Paddy Stapleton	Right corner back	Borris-Ileigh
26	James Woodlock	Midfield	Drom-Inch
27	Timmy Hammersley	Right corner forward	Clonoulty-Rossmore
28	Johnny Ryan	Midfield	Drom-Inch
29	Seán Curran	Left half forward	Mullinahone
30	David Young	Left half back	Toomevara
31	Kieran Bergin	Half back	Killenaule
32	John O'Dwyer	Corner forward	Killenaule
33	Thomas Hamill	Half back	Killea

== Friendly Games ==
On 7 December 2013, Tipperary defeated Westmeath in The Ragg by 3–20 to 0–13, with two goals from Patrick Maher and one from Conor Kenny. Wexford were defeated in Clonmel by 0–17 to 1–9 on 15 December. They then beat UCC on 4 January in Dr. Morris Park by 6–25 to 0–9. On 5 January, Tipperary defeated Offaly by 3–18 to 1–10 in Moneygall. Tipperary led by 2–9 to 0–6 at half-time with the goals coming from Conor Kenny and David Collins. John O’Dwyer scored Tipperary's third goal with five minutes remaining in the match.

5 January
Challenge Match

Tipperary	3–18 – 1–10	Offaly
N McGrath (0–1), S Kennedy (0–1); D Collins (1–1), J O'Dwyer (1–5, 0-2f), C Kenny (1–5), S Bourke (0–2), P Murphy (0–1), C O'Brien (0–2)	Report J Logue; P Stapleton, C O'Mahony, J Peters; S McGrath, J Barry, T Treacy; N McGrath, S Kennedy; D Collins, J O'Dwyer, S O'Brien; L McGrath, C Kenny, S Bourke. Subs: P Murphy for L McGrath, D Maher for S O'Brien, T Hamill for O'Mahony, C O'Brien for Treacy.	S Cleary (0–1), J Bergin (0-6f), P Geraghty (0–2), T Geraghty (1–0), C Parlon, B Carroll (0–1)

St Flannan’s Park Moneygall
Referee: J Ryan

== 2014 Waterford Crystal Cup ==
=== Summary ===
Tipperary opened their season with a 3–20 to 0–5 win against LIT in Nenagh in the preliminary round of the 2014 Waterford Crystal Cup on 12 January. Playing against the wind, Tipperary lead 2–8 to 0–1 after the first-half with Shane Bourke scoring a goal in the 5th minute and then Séamus Callanan hit a second goal from a penalty after 16 minutes. Lar Corbett got the third goal with just a few minutes left in the game. Tipperary faced holders Clare in the final for the third consecutive year on Friday 7 February in Limerick and won on a 4–22 to 3-11 scoreline. Michael Heffernan scored Tipperary's first-half goal with Denis Maher scoring two in the second-half after Conor Kenny had netted in the 38th minute. Clare had a 3–05 to 1–10 lead at half time but were outscored by 0–06 to 3–12 in the second half. Tipperary were captained in the final by James Woodlock.

=== Results ===
12 January
Preliminary round

Tipperary	3–20 – 0–5	LIT
J O’Dwyer (0–12, 9fs, 1 65), S Bourke (1–1), S Callanan (1–0 pen), (L Corbett 1–0), D Collins, C Kenny, N McGrath (0–2 each), J Woodlock (0–1)	Report D Gleeson; C Barrett, P Stapleton, J Peters; S McGrath, P Maher, B Maher; J Woodlock, R Maher; D Collins, S Callanan, C Kenny; S Bourke, D Maher, J O’Dwyer. Subs: L Corbett for Bourke (ht), N McGrath for Callanan (ht), M Cahill for R Maher (67)	P Hickey (0–3, 2fs), S O’Brien, P Robinson (0–1 each)

MacDonagh Park, Nenagh
Referee: D Kirwan (Cork)

19 January
13:00
Quarter-final

Tipperary	2–16 – 1–8	Kerry
E Kelly (1–8, 0-4f), M Cahill (1–2), D Collins (0–2), D Maher, N McGrath, R Maher, C O’Riordan (0–1)	Report D Egan; C Bartlett, C O’Mahony, J Peters; S McGrath, B Maher, C O’Brien; M Cahill, J Woodlock; D Maher, D Collins, Patrick B Maher; E Kelly, P Murphy, C Kenny Subs: N McGrath for P Murphy (h/t), Padraic Maher for J Woodlock (48), R Maher for P B Maher (52, C O’Riordan for D Collins (69).	S Nolan (0-5f), P Lucid, M Boyle and P Boyle (0–1)

Austin Stack Park, Tralee
Referee: D O’Driscoll (Limerick)

2 February
14:00
Semi-final

Tipperary	2–30 – 0–22	UL
J O’Dwyer 1–9 (0-5fs, 0–1 ’65′), K Morris 0–6 (5fs), C Kenny 1–1, S Callanan 0–3, M Heffernan, S McGrath, M Cahill, R Gleeson 0–2 each, K Bergin, B Maher & C O’Riordan 0–1 each	Report D Egan; C O’Brien, T Stapleton, J Peters; S McGrath, P Heffernan, R Maher; M Cahill, D Collins; K Bergin, M Heffernan, S Callanan; R Gleeson, J O’Dwyer, K Morris Subs: J Logue for Egan, C O’Riordan for Bergin, B Maher for Callanan, C Kenny for O’Dwyer (all half-time), S Bourke for Collins (39).	PJ Scully 0–9 (7fs), P Walsh 0–4, T Heffernan (2fs), B Stapleton 0–2 each, P Geraghty, M O’Neill, K Connolly, T O’Brien, B Maher 0–1 each.

Dr. Morris Park Thurles
Referee: Cathal McAllister (Cork)

7 February
19:30
Final

Tipperary	4–22 – 3–11	Clare
S Callanan 0–9 (7fs), D Maher 2–2, M Heffernan 1–1, C Kenny 1–0, J Woodlock, R Gleeson, K Morris 0–2 each, C O’Brien (f), S Bourke, S O’Brien, T Stapleton 0–1 each	Report D Gleeson; C Barrett, C O’Mahony, R Maher; S McGrath, T Stapleton, C O’Brien; J Woodlock (Capt.), S Bourke; D Maher, S Callanan, P Murphy; K Morris, C Kenny, M Heffernan; Subs: R Gleeson for Bourke (63), S O’Brien for Kenny (63), J O’Dwyer for Morris (63), P Heffernan for McGrath (66).	T Kelly 1–2, J Conlon 1–1, C McGrath 1–0, C Ryan (2fs), C O’Connell (2fs) 0–3 each, P Duggan 0–2

Gaelic Grounds
Attendance: 1,248
Referee: J Sexton (Cork)

== 2014 National Hurling League ==
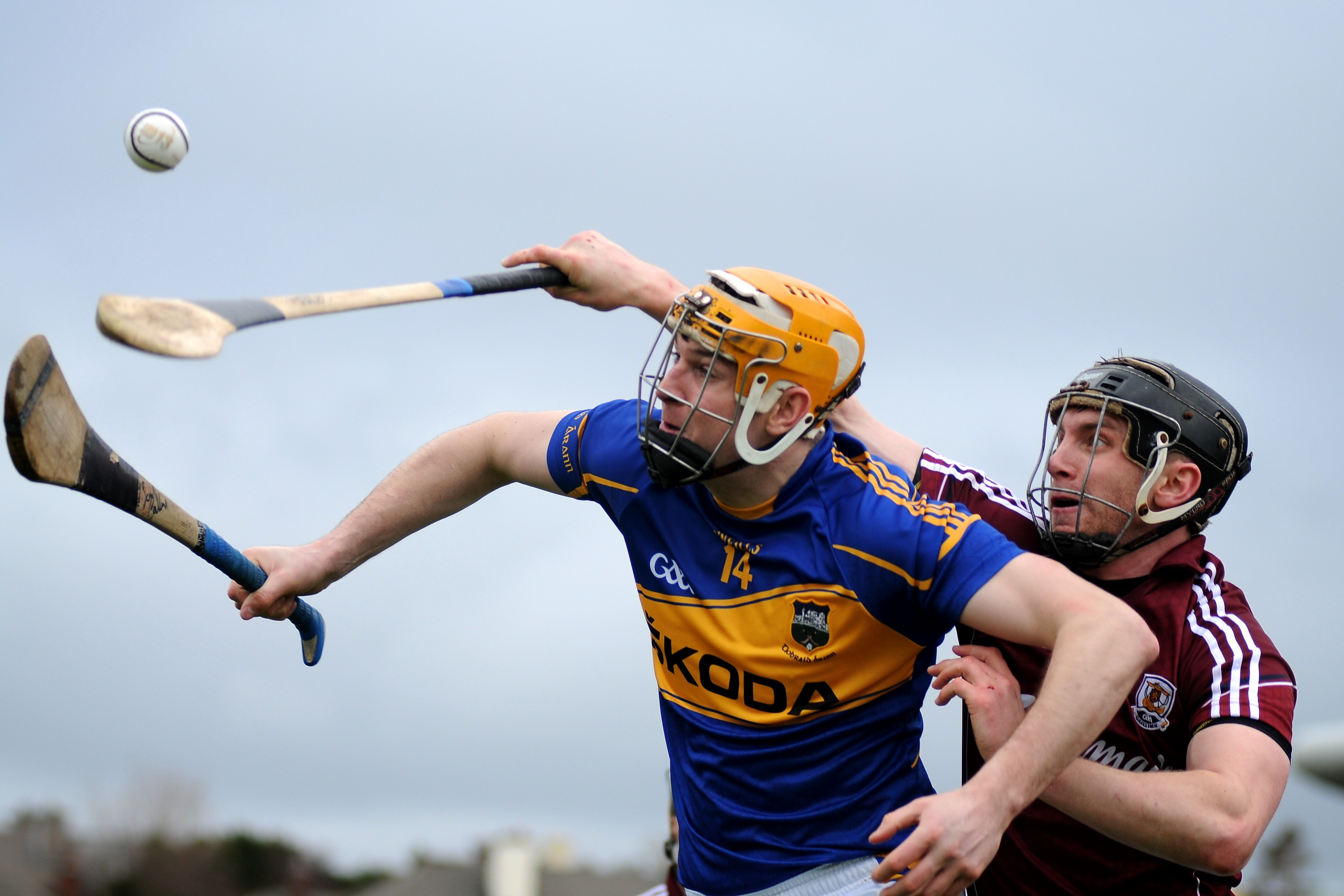
Séamus Callanan and Aidan Harte of Galway in action in the 2014 National Hurling League game in Pearse Stadium on 16 March

=== Squad ===
The Tipperary squad for the group stages of the National Hurling League was as follows, Cathal Barrett (Holycross-Ballycahill), James Barry (Upperchurch-Drombane), Kieran Bergin (Killenaule), Michael Cahill (Thurles Sarsfields), Séamus Callanan (Drom & Inch), Lar Corbett (Thurles Sarsfields), Darragh Egan (Kildangan), Darren Gleeson (Portroe), Tomas Hamill (Killea), Eoin Kelly (Mullinahone), Conor Kenny (Borris-Ileigh), Brendan Maher (Borris-Ileigh – Captain), Denis Maher (Thurles Sarsfields), Pádraic Maher (Thurles Sarsfields), Patrick Maher (Lorrha-Dorrha), Ronan Maher (Thurles Sarsfields), Noel McGrath (Loughmore-Castleiney), Shane McGrath (Ballinahinch), Liam McGrath (Loughmore-Castleiney), Paddy Murphy (Nenagh Éire Óg), Conor O Brien (Éire Óg Annacarty), John O’Dwyer (Killenaule), Conor O’Mahony (Newport), Jason Forde (Silvermines), Paddy Stapleton (Borris-Ileigh), James Woodlock (Drom & Inch)

=== Summary ===
Tipperary began their league campaign against Waterford on Saturday 15 February at Semple Stadium. They won the match by 2–13 to 0–16 with second-half goals coming from Seamus Callanan and goalkeeper Darren Gleeson after his long-range free drifted all the way into the Waterford net.

A week later on 23 February, Tipperary traveled to Nowlan Park to face Kilkenny in round 2 of the league. Within 15 minutes of the throw-in they had three goals scored, one each from the full-forward trio of Noel McGrath, Jason Forde and Seamus Callanan. Tipperary had a 10 pint lead late in the first half and a 6-point lead at half time while playing with the wind on a 4–9 to 2-9 scoreline. Séamus Callanan scored 3–6 in the game but Kilkenny ran out winners by 6 points.

In round 3 of the league on 9 March, Tipperary were defeated by Clare on a 0–20 to 4-15 scoreline at Semple Stadium. Clare forward Conor McGrath scored two goals in the first half and one in the second with Clare having a 3–7 to 0–8 lead at half time.

On 16 March, Tipperary lost their third league game in a row after a 1–19 to 3–16 defeat to Galway at Pearse Stadium. Three goals before half-time laid the foundation for a Galway win which puts Tipperary into relegation trouble. Galway had a 3–08 to 0–09 lead at half time.

On 23 March, Tipperary defeated Dublin by 1–19 to 0–19 in their final divisional game to qualify for the quarter-finals. Tipperary needed to win by 3 points to have a chance of making the quarter-finals at the expense of Dublin and Waterford. With Tipperary leading by 3 points in the last seconds of the game, Dublin player Niall McMorrow sent in a low ball from the 45 metre line into the box instead of going for the point which would have qualified Dublin for the quarter-finals. A point by sub Ronan Maher in the 72nd minute gave Tipperary the required advantage of 3 points to qualify for a quarter-final against Cork. Speaking after the game, Tipperary manager Eamon O'Shea was happy to get the win saying ""We probably were missing one third of our team who you think might be live contenders for championship, today. That's five or six quality players – we've been missing players all through the league here and there, but our form still wasn't good. I'm not trying to take away from the common perception, which is right. We just couldn't seem to get rhythm in our play. The positive thing about this week and even last week before the Galway game ... this is why I was really annoyed that we didn't play to our potential last week ... because we've had two or three weeks of really good training, really good work. I don't disagree that our performances went through bad patches and I wouldn't criticise anybody for the criticism. This is life. Sometimes I think Tipp are a team that have to have rhythm."

In the league quarter-final on 30 March at Semple Stadium, Tipperary defeated Cork by 3–25 to 4–19. Tipperary scored 2-4 without reply in the opening eight minutes, Denis Maher with the first goal inside a minute and corner-forward Niall O’Meara with the second when he doubled on a miss-hit shot by James Woodlock. Cork recovered to lead by two points at half time on a 3–11 to 3-9 scoreline. Cork goalkeeper Anthony Nash had a late free saved which would have sent the game into extra-time but Tipperary held on to win by three points.

On 20 April, Tipperary beat Clare at the Gaelic Grounds to set up a hurling League final against Kilkenny for the second year in a row. Two goals from Patrick Maher and a haul of 0-12 from Seamus Callanan saw Tipperary win in the end by seven points. Tipperary lead by seven-points at half time.

Tipperary made it to the league final in spite of losing three of their opening four league games and conceding 12 goals and 67 points. The last time that Tipperary beat Kilkenny in a league final was in 1968.

In the final played on 4 May at Semple Stadium, Kilkenny won on a 2-25 1-27 scoreline with TJ Reid getting the winning score in the last minute after extra-time. Tipperary had led by 1–11 to 1–9 at half time, the Tipperary goal coming from John O'Dwyer when he connected with Noel McGrath's sideline cut to touch the ball to the net from the edge of the square. The game finished in a draw at 2–17 to 1-20 after 70 minutes with injury time points for Tipperary from Shane Bourke and Kieran Bergin sending the game to extra time. Both goals for Kilkenny came from penalties and both scored by TJ Reid and the sides were level 11 times.

=== Results ===
15 February
19:00
Round 1

Tipperary	2–13 – 0–16	Waterford
S Callanan 1–4 (2f), J O’Dwyer 0–4 (4f), D Gleeson 1–0 (1-0f), N McGrath 0–2, J Woodlock, K Bergin & D Maher 0–1 each	Report D Gleeson; C Barrett, C O’Mahony, M Cahill; S McGrath, P Maher, C O’Brien; B Maher, J Woodlock; S Callanan, N McGrath, K Bergin; J Forde, P Murphy, J O’Dwyer; Subs: L McGrath for Forde (43), D Maher for O’Dwyer (49), S Bourke for Murphy (56), R Maher for Woodlock (59).	Pauric Mahony 0–10 (9f), Philip Mahony 0–2, Kevin Moran, J Dillon, M Shanahan & B O’Sullivan 0–1 each

Semple Stadium
Attendance: 4,786
Referee: C Lyons (Cork)

23 February
14:00
Round 2

Kilkenny	5–20 – 5–14	Tipperary
C Fennelly 3-5, H Shefflin 1-5 (0-5fs), W Walsh 0-5, M Kelly 1-1, R Hogan 0-2, T J Reid, P Walsh 0-1 each	Report D Gleeson; P Stapleton, T Stapleton, C Barrett; S McGrath, C O'Brien, M Cahill; P Maher, J Woodlock; K Bergin, P Murphy, B Maher; N McGrath, S Callanan, J Forde; Subs: P Maher for Forde (51), J O'Dwyer for Bergin (59), D Maher for McGrath (63), M Heffernan for Murphy (66), R Maher for C O'Brien (70).	S Callanan 3-6 (0-3fs, 0-2 65s), N McGrath 1-3, J Forde 1-0, M Cahill 0-2 B Maher, J Woodlock, P Maher 0-1 each

Nowlan Park
Attendance: 8,651
Referee: D Kirwan (Cork)

9 March
13:15
Round 3

Tipperary	0–20 – 4–15	Clare
J O’Dwyer 0-7 (3f, 0-1 65); S Bourke 0-2; C Kenny 0-2; J Woodlock 0-2; J Forde 0-2 (1f); S McGrath, P Murphy, N McGrath, K Bergin, M Heffernan, 0-1 each.	Report D Gleeson; C Barrett, P Stapleton, M Cahill; S McGrath, T Hamill, T Stapleton; B Maher (c), J Woodlock; P Murphy, N McGrath, K Bergin; S Bourke, J O’Dwyer, J Forde Subs: C O’Mahony for Hamill (35), D Maher for Murphy (40), C Kenny for Bourke (57), M Heffernan for Bergin (61), R Maher for Forde (64).	C McGrath 3-1; J Conlon 1-3; Colin Ryan 0-4 (2f, 0-1 65); P Duggan 0-2; D Honan, C Galvin, P Donnellan, S Morey, T Kelly, 0-1 each.

Semple Stadium
Attendance: 8,133
Referee: J Owens (Wexford)

16 March
14:00
Round 4

Tipperary	1–19 – 3–16	Galway
S Callanan 1-11 (1-8f, 1 65), J O’Dwyer, K Bergin and S McGrath 0-2 each, N McGrath and M Heffernan 0-1 each.	Report Darren Gleeson; Michael Cahill, Paddy Stapleton, Cathal Barrett; Brendan Maher (c), Conor O’Mahony, Padraic Maher; Shane McGrath, James Woodlock; Noel McGrath, John O’Dwyer, Patrick Maher; Conor Kenny, Seamus Callanan, Micheal Heffernan Subs: Kieran Bergin for Woodlock (23); Eoin Kelly for Kenny (32); Denis Maher for N McGrath (ht); Conor O’Brien for Heffernan (44); Paddy Murphy for Cahill (62)	C Cooney (1 pen, 3f), N Healy 1-3 each, J Glynn 1-1, D Burke (1 sideline), P Brehony 0-3 each, J Coen, I Tannian, C Mannion 0-1 each.

Pearse Stadium
Referee: A Stapleton (Laois)

23 March
14:00
Round 5

Tipperary	1–19 – 0–19	Dublin
S Callanan (0-11, 8fs), P Maher (1-0), N McGrath (0-3), J O’Dwyer (0-2), M Cahill, K Bergin, R Maher (0-1 each).	Report D Egan; P Stapleton, C O’Mahony, C Barrett; M Cahill, B Maher (c), C O’Brien; K Bergin, S McGrath; J O’Dwyer, N McGrath, P Murphy; J Forde, S Callanan, P Maher Subs: D Maher for Murphy (35), J Barry for Cahill (inj. 38), E Kelly for P Maher (inj. 52), R Maher for S McGrath (62), M Heffernan for Forde (69).	A McCrabbe (0-10, 8fs), R O’Dwyer, D Sutcliffe (0-3 each), M Carton (0-2), J Boland (0-1f).

Semple Stadium
Referee: Brian Gavin (Offaly)

30 March
15:30
Quarter-final

Tipperary	3–25 – 4–19	Cork
J O’Dwyer 1-7; S Callanan 0-8 (3f, 0-1 65); D Maher 1-1; N O’Meara 1-0; J Woodlock 0-2; N McGrath 0-2; S Bourke 0-2; C O’Brien, B Maher and K Bergin 0-1 each.	Report D Egan; P Stapleton, C O’Mahony, C O’Brien; J Barry, B Maher (c), T Stapleton; K Bergin, J Woodlock; D Maher, N McGrath, J O’Dwyer; S Bourke, S Callanan, N O’Meara; Subs: R Maher for O’Mahony (35), J Forde for O’Meara (52), L wMcGrath for Bourke (62), E Kelly for D Maher (66), J O’Brien for Callanan (70+1).	P Horgan 1-8 (5f, 0-1 65); S Harnedy 2-0; A Nash 1-0 (f); J Coughlan 0-3; C Lehane 0-3; D Kearney 0-2; K Burke, W Egan and P Cronin 0-1 each.

Semple Stadium
Attendance: 6,615
Referee: Barry Kelly (Westmeath).

20 April
16:00
Semi-final

Tipperary	2–24 – 2–17	Clare
S Callanan 0-12 (6f, 2 '65', 0-1 pen), Patrick Maher 2-0, N O'Meara 0-3, J O'Dwyer 0-2 (1f), S Bourke 0-2, D Maher 0-1, J Barry 0-1, N McGrath 0-1, J Woodlock 0-1, G Ryan 0-1	Report D Gleeson; C Barrett, Padraic Maher, M Cahill; J Barry, B Maher, C O'Mahoney; K Bergin, J Woodlock; D Maher, Patrick Maher, J O'Dwyer; N McGrath, S Callanan, N O’Meara; Subs: G Ryan for D Maher (47), S McGrath for N McGrath (51), S Bourke for J O'Dwyer (62), M Breen for J Woodlock (68).	C Ryan 0-5 (4f), C McInerney 1-1, P Donnellan 1-1, P Collins 0-2, C McGrath 0-2, C Galvin 0-2, T Kelly 0-2 (1f), D McInerney 0-1, J Conlon 0-1

Gaelic Grounds
Attendance: 20,452
Referee: C Lyons (Cork)

4 May
15:30
Final

Tipperary	1-27 - 2-25 (AET)	Kilkenny
S Callanan 0-9 (8f, 1 65), J O’Dwyer 1-3, N McGrath 0-5 (1 sl), Denis Maher and N O’Meara 0-2 each, K Bergin, J Woodlock and Patrick Maher 0-1 each.	Report D Gleeson; C Barrett, Pádraic Maher, M Cahill; J Barry, B Maher, C O’Mahony; K Bergin, J Woodlock; D Maher, Patrick Maher, J O’Dwyer; N McGrath, S Callanan, N O’Meara Subs: T Stapleton for B Maher (temp, 45-46), G Ryan for D Maher (54), S McGrath for Woodlock (76), S Bourke for O’Meara (62), J O’Brien for Callanan (69), S Callanan for J O’Brien (76), J O’Brien for O’Dwyer (80), J O’Dwyer for Bourke (88).	TJ Reid 2-11 (2-0 pen, 8f, 1 65), R Hogan 0-6, R Power 0-3 (1f), M Fennelly and P Walsh 0-2 each, C Fennelly 0-1.

Semple Stadium
Attendance: 21,601
Referee: James Owens (Wexford)

== 2014 Munster Senior Hurling Championship ==
Tipperary faced Limerick in the Munster Senior Hurling Championship semi-final on 1 June at Semple Stadium. Speaking before the match against Limerick, Tipperary manager Eamon O'Shea said "There are probably nine teams that can win the All-Ireland, It's very competitive – there's a great equality among teams. In Munster, any one of the five could have a shot at it. I think Clare are slightly ahead because they had the confidence of playing last year and playing really well, and having a system that's really good and that they know how to play."

Cathal Barrett, James Barry and Niall O'Meara were all named in the starting line-up to make his first championship appearance for Tipperary. Denis Maher also came on in the 62nd minute of the game to make his championship debut. Limerick won the game on a 2–18 to 2-16 scoreline. With Tipperary leading by three points, Limerick's Shane Dowling scored the equalising goal in the 68th minute before substitute Thomas Ryan put Limerick a point clear in the first minute of stoppage time with Seamus Hickey landeding the insurance score at the Killinan End for a two-point win. The sides had been level at 1-8 apiece.

The defeat was a fourth straight championship defeat in three years since losing to Kilkenny in the 2012 All-Ireland semi-final. Speaking after the game Tipperary manager Eamon O’Shea felt that Tipperary need to work on their game management, saying "I believe that we have something in the dressing room and I believe we’ll show it before the end of the season, We have a very disappointed dressing room, naturally. I don’t have any excuses either. I’m not using any excuses. We were a couple of points up and should have finished out the game. We were beaten in the 70th minute, injury-time, so we’re disappointed. As the manager I am looking and saying what can we do to finish a game out where we are there or thereabouts. It is an issue. We are very close to finishing it out, but very close doesn’t mean anything in sport. There are winners and there are losers in sport. You are talking to the losers."

1 June
16:15
Munster Semi-final

Tipperary	2–16 – 2–18	Limerick
G Ryan 1-2, Patrick Maher 1-0, S Callanan 0-5 (3f), J O’Dwyer 0-5 (1f), N McGrath, N O’Meara, L Corbett & D Maher 0-1 each.	Report D Gleeson; C Barrett, Pádraic Maher, M Cahill; J Barry, B Maher, C O’Mahony; K Bergin, S McGrath; G Ryan, N McGrath, N O’Meara; J O’Dwyer, S Callanan, Patrick Maher Subs: L Corbett for Barry (54), D Maher for O’Meara (62), C O’Brien for Cahill (65), S Bourke for O’Dwyer (68), T Stapleton for S McGrath (70).	S Dowling 2-9 (1-9f), D O’Grady & K Downes 0-2 each, S Hickey, P Browne, D Hannon, G Mulcahy & T Ryan 0-1 each.

Semple Stadium
Attendance: 24,962
Referee: B Kelly (Westmeath)

== 2014 All-Ireland qualifiers ==
=== Round 1 ===
Tipperary met Galway in Round 1 of the All-Ireland Senior Hurling Qualifiers on 5 July. The draw took place on RTE Radio 1's 'Morning Ireland’ programme at the RTÉ Radio Centre on 23 June. The game was broadcast by Sky Sports on 5 July with a 7.00pm throw-in.

Ronan Maher made his championship debut starting at midfield. Tipperary secured their first championship victory since the Munster final of 2012 with a 3–25 to 4–13 win. At half-time, the sides were level at 2–9 to 1–12. Galway had a 4–12 to 1–15 lead with 20 minutes to go but Tipperary then outscored Galway by 2–10 to 0–1 in the remainder of the game. Seamus Callanan scored 3–9 with 3-1 coming from play. Speaking after the match Callinan said "It’s my job to score when all the boys do the hard work outside, It doesn’t work out every day but we kept trying, a few breaks came my way but the next day they will come someone else’s way and that’s how we look at it. We all try to do our best in our own patch and if we all work hard together the results will come."

Manager Eamon O'Shea never lost hope during the game saying "I've always said that the manager takes the heat at times but the team are the thing that matter because they're the ones that go out and perform on the pitch. They're at an age where they want to express themselves and we just encourage them to express themselves. I felt at half-time that the lads were determined to do something, we knew they'd have a spell again. When you haven't lost the will to survive with the hurling we have, then things can happen. It doesn't always happen, but things can happen, and that's what I was looking at."

An average of 34,000 viewers tuned in to watch the match on Sky Sports 3 in Ireland, which represented 2.8pc of the market share.

5 July
19:00
All Ireland Qualifier Round 1

Tipperary	3–25 – 4–13	Galway
S Callanan (3-08, 0-07f), J O’Dwyer (0-06), N McGrath (0-05), L Corbett (0-02), J Woodlock, Patrick Maher, K Bergin, S McGrath (0-01 each	Report D Gleeson; P Stapleton, Padraic Maher, M Cahill; B Maher, J Barry, C Barrett; R Maher, J Woodlock; G Ryan, Patrick Maher, N McGrath; J O’Dwyer, S Callanan, L Corbett; Subs: K Bergin R Maher (h.t.), S McGrath for G Ryan (69), J O’Brien for Corbett (70+2).	J Glynn (2-00), J Canning (0-05, 1sl), C Cooney (0-04f), J Flynn, David Burke (1-00 each), C Mannion (0-2), P Brehony, D Glennon (0-01 each

Semple Stadium
Attendance: 18,467
Referee: C Lyons (Cork)

=== Round 2 ===
The draw for the second round took place on 7 July with Tipperary drawn to face Offaly at O'Moore Park on 12 July. The game was broadcast by Sky Sports with a 7.00pm throw-in. The starting lineup showed one change to the team that started against Galway with Kieran Bergin replacing Ronan Maher at midfield. Tipperary won the game easily by 17 points and had a 4–9 to 0–11 lead at half time. Manager Eamon O'Shea wasn't happy with Tipperary's performance despite their 17-point winning margin, saying "There is no guarantee on any given day that the turn-on switch will be found when you want it, One of the things at this level, you cannot afford to turn off like that because sometimes when you turn on again it is too late. Having said that they do know they need to improve. We are not happy. I don't mean that with any disrespect to winning the game, but we are not happy with our own level. Offaly brought something to the game and that should be acknowledged. They fought and were well organised. The win didn't reflect the game, it was certainly closer to a seven, eight, nine-point game." Tipperary will now go on to play Dublin in the quarter-finals on 27 July at Semple Stadium.

12 July
19:00
All Ireland Qualifier Round 2

Tipperary	5-25 - 1-20	Offaly
S Callanan 2-10 (0-7f), L Corbett 2-2, Patrick Maher 1-1, K Bergin 0-4, D Maher 0-2, J Woodlock, J O'Dwyer, N McGrath, E Kelly, J Forde & T Stapleton 0-1 each	Report D Gleeson; C Barrett, Padraic Maher, M Cahill; J Barry, C O’Mahony, B Maher; K Bergin, J Woodlock; G Ryan, Patrick Maher, J O’Dwyer; N McGrath, S Callanan, L Corbett; Subs: D Maher for Ryan (temp 7-12), D Maher for Ryan (h.t.), T Stapleton for Barrett (47), E Kelly for O'Dwyer (59), S McGrath for Woodlock (60), J Forde for Patrick Maher (66)	B Carroll 0-13 (10f), C Egan 1-0, J Bergin 0-3 (1f, 1 65), C Parlon, S Dooley, S Ryan & D Currams 0-1 each

O'Moore Park
Attendance: 9,500
Referee: Alan Kelly (Galway)

=== Quarter-final ===
The Tipperary team was named on 24 July and was unchanged from the win over Offaly for the game against Dublin in the quarter-final. A crowd of over 40,000 was expected at Semple Stadium for the game which was the second part of a quarter-final double header with Limerick and Wexford also meeting. Both games will be televised live on RTE. Michael Cahill's knee injury kept him out of the team with Pauric Maher starting at wing back and James Barry at full back. Cathal Barrett started at corner back with Kieran Bergin at wing back and Shane McGrath atmidfield. Tipperary won the game comfortably on a 2–23 to 0-16 scoreline to qualify for an all Ireland semi-final on 17 August against Cork at Croke Park. They had a 0–15 to 0–8 lead at half time. John O'Dwyer scored two second half goals, the first a low shot from the right after a pass from Seamus Callanan and the second from the left when he followed up after the goalkeeper saved the initial shot from Patrick Maher. He was named as the man of the match by The Sunday Game.

Manager Eamon O'Shea speaking after the match said that people should reassess their estimation of the team since the defeat to Galway in the league in March, saying "We have played eight times, won six, and my belief is that we should have won the league final and we lost the game against Limerick in the last minute. I just think there needs to be a reassessment of that from commentators. When you win six games, surely it can't all be bad. The loss to Limerick was not a good result but there was a cycle where we were playing games within a range of playing well. I didn't feel we went outside of that range. We didn't play that well against Limerick - we certainly didn't finish it. I am not saying that the assessment is completely wrong. I am just saying that you need to look at the whole thing in totality because there may be a different view there."

27 July
16:00
All Ireland Quarter-final

Tipperary	2-23 - 0-16	Dublin
S Callanan (0-11, 7 frees, 2 ‘65’s); J O’Dwyer (2-2, 0-1 free); G Ryan (0-3); L Corbett (0-2); S McGrath, J Woodlock, Patrick Maher, N McGrath, S Bourke, (all 0-1)	Report D Gleeson; P Stapleton, Padraic Maher, C Barrett; B Maher, J Barry, S McGrath; K Bergin, J Woodlock; G Ryan, Patrick Maher, J O’Dwyer; N McGrath, S Callanan, L Corbett; Subs: D Maher for Patrick Maher (temp. 51-53), D Maher for N McGrath (59), J Forde for Ryan (61), E Kelly for Corbett (64), S Bourke for Patrick Maher (68), T Stapleton for Woodlock (70).	Alan McCrabbe 0-5 (0-5f), Conal Keaney, Paul Ryan (0-1f, 0-1 ’65) 0-2 each, Eamon Dillon, Liam Rushe (0-1f), Ryan O’Dwyer, Johnny McCaffrey, Danny Sutcliffe, David Treacy, David O’Callaghan 0-1 each

Semple Stadium
Attendance: 43,088
Referee: Brian Gavin (Offaly)

=== Semi-final ===
Tipperary played Munster champions Cork in the semi-final at Croke Park on 17 August. It was Tipperary's first game back at Croke Park since their 18-point semi-final defeat to Kilkenny in 2012. Cork got the opening score from Alan Cadogan in the first minute, but it was the only time in the game that Cork were in front. Cork's Shane O’Neill fumbled an easy ball that allowed Séamus Callanan to fire in Tipperary's first goal in the sixth minute. At half time Tipperary had only a two-point lead on a 1–7 to 0-8 scoreline. Seamus Callanan got his second goal of the game in the 47th minute after a pass from Bonner Maher. 2-17 of Tipperary's scores came from play.

Speaking on The Sunday Game highlights programme on the night of the match, former Cork hurler Dónal Óg Cusack said that in his opinion Tipperary goalkeeper Darren Gleeson gave the greatest ever display of tactical puckouts in the game saying "Darren Gleeson gave the greatest display of tactical puckouts ever seen... I want to put it on record: it was the greatest display of puckouts ever but the Cork defending was poor". Tipperary won 70% of their puckouts during the game.

Tipperary manager Eamon O'Shea speaking after the game said "There was a lot of talk about shoot-outs and so on and I don't think it was ever going to be a shoot-out, certainly from our end," he told us after. "But we just worked our way to the win really, that's the most pleasing aspect. That we ground out the win by working really hard. Whatever way the game would have turned, we would have won it!"

17 August
15:30
All Ireland Semi-final

Tipperary	2-18 - 1-11	Cork
S Callanan 2-4 (0-1f), J O'Dwyer 0-6, S McGrath, J Woodlock 0-3, N McGrath (0-2)	Report D Gleeson; P Stapleton, J Barry, C Barrett; K Bergin, B Maher, Padraic Maher; S McGrath, J Woodlock; G Ryan, Patrick Maher, N McGrath; J O’Dwyer, S Callanan, L Corbett; Subs: Maher for G Ryan (57); E Kelly for L Corbett (60); J Forde for Patrick Maher (inj, 65); M Cahill for S McGrath (inj, 65); C O’Brien for J Woodlock (69).	C Lehane (0-4); R O’Shea (1-0); A Nash, P Horgan (0-2, frees each); A Cadogan, S Harnedy, A Walsh (0-1 each).

Croke Park
Attendance: 68,728
Referee: J Owens (Wexford)

=== Final ===
On 25 August, manager Eamon O'Shea confirmed that his squad came through the weekend's round of club championship matches without any injuries and will have a full panel to pick from for the final. Tipperary training sessions will be open to the public on 25 August and on the last training session Thursday evening 4 September. The Tipperary team will be announced by email at 9pm on 4 September. The Tipperary post-match banquet, supported by the County Board and the Tipperary Supporters Club, will be held in the DoubleTree Hilton Hotel in Dublin starting at 8pm.

Kilkenny manager Brian Cody speaking before the match said that what has gone before between Tipperary and Kilkenny in matches holds no value come throw-in time. Tipperary manager Eamon O'Shea said that if they lost to Galway in the qualifiers it could have been the end of the road for him.

The Tipperary team was named on the evening of 4 September after their last training session. The team is unchanged from the semi-final win against Cork with Michael Cahill failing to regain the number four shirt since a knee injury kept him out of the win against Dublin. Pádraic Maher, though named at full-back, is expected to line out at left half-back, with James Barry going to full-back. Captain Brendan Maher is expected to start at centre-back. Five Tipperary players will be playing in their first All-Ireland final, Darren Gleeson, Cathal Barrett, James Barry, Kieran Bergin and John O'Dwyer.

The Tipperary team that won the 1989 All-Ireland Final were presented to the crowd before the match to mark 25 years.

The match finished in a draw for the third year in a row after no draws since the 1959 final. The final has been described my many as the greatest final in history and also the greatest hurling match in history.

Tipperary had a free from 97 metres out in injury time with the scores level. John O'Dwyer took the free which was hit just wide to the right and required conformation from Hawk-eye.

==== Match details ====
7 September 2014
15:30
Final

Kilkenny	3-22 - 1-28	Tipperary
TJ Reid 1-8 (6f), R Power 2-1, R Hogan 0-6, E Larkin 0-2, C Fennelly, M Fennelly, C Fogarty, W Walsh, B Hogan 0-1 each.	Report	S Callanan 0-7 (2f), J O’Dwyer 0-7 (2f), Patrick Maher 1-1, N McGrath 0-4, S McGrath, L Corbett 0-2 each, J Woodlock, G Ryan, M Cahill, P Stapleton, J Forde 0-1 each.

Croke Park, Dublin
Attendance: 82,179
Referee: Barry Kelly

Kilkenny	Tipperary

KILKENNY:
1	Eoin Murphy
2	Paul Murphy
3	J. J. Delaney
4	Jackie Tyrrell
5	Joey Holden
6	Brian Hogan
7	Cillian Buckley
8	Richie Hogan
9	Conor Fogarty
10	Michael Fennelly
11	Colin Fennelly
12	T. J. Reid
13	Walter Walsh
14	Rickie Power
15	Eoin Larkin
Substitutes:
23	Aidan Fogarty for W. Walsh (48 mins)
19	Pádraig Walsh for J. Holden (61 mins)
22	Henry Shefflin for C. Fennelly (66 mins)
26	John Power for R. Hogan (71 mins)
Manager:
Brian Cody

TIPPERARY:
1	Darren Gleeson
2	Cathal Barrett
3	Pádraic Maher
4	Paddy Stapleton
5	Brendan Maher (captain)
6	James Barry
7	Kieran Bergin
8	Shane McGrath
9	James Woodlock
10	Gearóid Ryan
11	Patrick Maher
12	John O'Dwyer
13	Noel McGrath
14	Séamus Callinan
15	Lar Corbett
Substitutes:
Substitutes:
18	Michael Cahill for G. Ryan (49 mins)
21	Eoin Kelly for J. Woodlock (63 mins)
20	Jason Forde for S. McGrath (67 mins)
23	John O'Brien for S. Callinan (70 mins)
Manager:
Eamon O'Shea

Man of the Match:
Richie Hogan

Linesmen:
Colm Lyons (Corcaigh)
Brian Gavin (Uíbh Fhailí)

Sideline Official
Cathal McAllister (Corcaigh)

Umpires
Michael Coyle
Seamus O’Brien
Paddy Walsh
Paul Reville

=== Reaction ===
Tipperary's Pádraic Maher said that he knew the injury-time attempt from John O’Dwyer was wide before being confirmed by Hawk-Eye saying "“I was standing right behind Bubbles. I stood right behind his free and I thought it was for three-quarters of the way going over the bar, but it just curled off at the finish. I didn’t even look up at the Hawk Eye because I f***ing knew it was gone wide. Excuse my language, but that’s just the ups and downs of the game. It was fantastic. It must have been some game to watch and it was great to be a part of it. It’s a big game again in three weeks’ time and we'll just try and come out the right side of the result.”

Manager Eamon O'Shea was focusing on the positives after the draw saying ""I feel I was a participant in a brilliant game," "Of course you feel drained, you try to win the game right until the end, but I just felt the occasion in terms of the game was just one of those was games..."I don't know what it looked like when you're dispassionate...but I just felt it was one of those games, like in 2009 (All-Ireland Final which Kilkenny won), it was just one of those games where you felt it was just good to be there." O'Shea also thought that John O'Dwyer's late free had gone over the bar saying " "I felt he had a chance," I thought it was over but obviously HawkEye said no. He got a great strike on it and he was unlucky." "I'm looking forward to the next day," "When you're involved in a game like that, from my perspective, you just try and win the game right until the end. You don't get a chance to get too emotional about it so I'm just looking forward to the next day, "I thought they (Tipperary) did really well today. They worked really hard, they believed in what they were doing. We could have won it, we might have lost it because we were playing against a fantastic team."

The final was shown live in Ireland on RTÉ One as part of The Sunday Game live programme, presented by Michael Lyster from Croke Park, with studio analysis from Cyril Farrell, Tomás Mulcahy and Ger Loughnane. Match commentary was provided by Ger Canning with analysis by Michael Duignan. The game was also shown live on Sky Sports, presented by Rachel Wyse and Brian Carney.

Highlights of the final were shown on The Sunday Game programme which aired at 9:30pm that night on RTÉ Two and was presented by Des Cahill with analysis from Donal Óg Cusack, Liam Sheedy, and Eddie Brennan. On the man of the match award shortlist were Richie Hogan, John O'Dwyer and Cathal Barrett, with Richie Hogan winning the award.

The Tipperary team remained in Dublin on Sunday night before returning home.

=== Final Replay ===
It was announced right after the drawn match that the replay would take place on Saturday, 27 September at 5pm at Croke park.

Tipperary manager Eamon O'Shea speaking ahead of the replay said “We just see it as another game that’s coming up and it’s a game that has to be won.” O'Shea admitted to not watching a full re-run of the drawn game saying “I don't think I watched the full game: “I watched bits and pieces of it. Damien Young is really good on the videos, so I don't tend to watch the games fully, I say to him can you pick out this, that and the other.

=== Tickets ===
The GAA announced on 8 September that ticket prices for the replay would be reduced with stand tickets reduced to €50 from €80 and terrace tickets priced at €25.

=== Referee ===
Offaly official Brian Gavin was named as the referee for the replay on 10 September. It will be the third time he has refereed a senior final as he did the 2011 final between the same two teams and the drawn 2013 final between Clare and Cork. Wexford's James Owens will be the standby referee with James McGrath as the other linesman and the sideline official will be Alan Kelly from Galway.

=== Team News ===
Both teams for the replay were announced on 25 September with Kilkenny making three changes to the team. John Power comes in to replace Walter Walsh, Padraig Walsh comes in at wing-back in place of Joey Holden while Kieran Joyce replaces Brian Hogan. Tipperary have made no changes to their team and start with the same fifteen.

== Match details (Replay) ==
=== Summary ===
Tipperary scored the first goal of the game in the 28th minute when Lar Corbett passed to the left to Séamus Callanan who passed the ball past the goalkeeper and into the net. Tipperary were leading the game by two points at half time on a 1–7 to 0-8 scoreline. Richie Power scored a goal for Kilkenny on 59 minutes shooting low to the net after catching a high ball, which put Kilkenny four points ahead. John Power then got a second goal four minutes later turning the ball home after an initial save from Darren Gleeson to put Kilkenny into a six-point lead. Seamus Callanan got his second goal a minute from the end of normal time shooting low to the net on the ground to leave only two between the teams. Colin Fennelly then got an injury-time point which extended Kilkenny's lead to three which is how the match finished. Kilkenny won the replay on a 2–17 to 2-14 scoreline. It was their 35th All-Ireland title and the 10th senior All-Ireland of Brian Cody’s managerial career the 10th and final All-Ireland of Henry Shefflin’s playing career before he retired in March 2015.

27 September 2014
17:00
Final Replay

Kilkenny	2-17 - 2-14	Tipperary
TJ Reid 0-5(5f), R Power 1-1 (1 ’65′), J Power 1-1, C Fennelly 0-3, R Hogan 0-2, M Fennelly 0-2, E Larkin 0-2, P Walsh 0-1	Report	S Callanan 2-5 (4f, 0-1 pen), J O’Dywer 0-3 (1 ’65′), S McGrath 0-3, N McGrath 0-2, B Maher 0-1

Croke Park, Dublin
Attendance: 81,753
Referee: Brian Gavin

Kilkenny	Tipperary

KILKENNY:
1	Eoin Murphy
2	Paul Murphy
3	J. J. Delaney
4	Jackie Tyrrell
5	Pádraig Walsh
6	Kieran Joyce
7	Cillian Buckley
8	Richie Hogan
9	Conor Fogarty
10	Michael Fennelly
11	Colin Fennelly
12	Eoin Larkin
13	Rickie Power
14	T. J. Reid
15	John Power
Substitutes:
22	Henry Shefflin for R. Hogan (58 mins)
26	Lester Ryan (Captain) for M Fennelly (67 mins)
Manager:
Brian Cody

TIPPERARY:
1	Darren Gleeson
2	Cathal Barrett
3	Pádraic Maher
4	Paddy Stapleton
5	Brendan Maher (captain)
6	James Barry
7	Kieran Bergin
8	Shane McGrath
9	James Woodlock
10	Gearóid Ryan
11	Patrick Maher
12	John O'Dwyer
13	Noel McGrath
14	Séamus Callinan
15	Lar Corbett
Substitutes:
18	Michael Cahill for S. McGrath (56 mins)
24	Conor O'Mahony for G. Ryan (64 mins)
17	Shane Bourke for L Corbett (65 mins)
17	Jason Forde for N McGrath (67 mins)
23	John O'Brien for J O’Dwyer (70 mins)
Manager:
Eamon O'Shea

Man of the Match:
Kieran Joyce

Linesmen:
James Owens (Loch Garman)
James McGrath (An Iarmhí)

Sideline Official
Alan Kelly (Gaillimh)

Umpires
Michael Gavin
David Gavin
William Flynn
PJ Lawlor

=== Reaction ===
Tipperary manager Eamon O'Shea speaking after the game said "We came up to win... but I really think there are more important things... the important things are that I have a dressing room of men, who fought the battle to the end, who didn't flinch when things didn't go their way." "I have a dressing-room full of men down there who fought the battle to the end, who didn't flinch, who... things didn't go their way and yet the team kept going," he said. "You don't always win but when Tipp play now, we really try until it's no longer possible and I think they can be proud of that." he said. Speaking the day after the match, Kilkenny manager Brian Cody said that the decision to award the late free to Tipperary by referee Barry Kelly in the draw game was "criminal."

== Awards ==
The Sunday Game team of the year was picked on 28 September, which was the night after the final replay. Tipperary had six players named in the team for 2014.

- (1) Darren Gleeson
- (5) Brendan Maher
- (6) Pádraic Maher
- (11) Patrick Maher
- (12) John O'Dwyer
- (14) Séamus Callinan

Séamus Callanan who scored 2–5 in the replay of the final against Kilkenny, scored a total of 9–50 with 9-16 coming from play to finish as the top scorer in the championship.

Tipperary had eleven players nominated for the All Stars Awards hurling team of the year which will be announced live at the awards ceremony on 24 October. The players nominated are Darren Gleeson, Cathal Barrett, Paddy Stapleton, Kieran Bergin, Brendan Maher, Pádraic Maher, Shane McGrath, Patrick Maher, John O’Dwyer, Noel McGrath, and Séamus Callanan. Séamus Callanan has also been nominated for the All Stars Hurler of the Year, with Cathal Barrett nominated for the All Stars Young Hurler of the Year award. On 24 October, seven Tipperary players were named in the 2014 All Star hurling team. Tipperary are represented by goalkeeper Darren Gleeson, half-backs, Brendan Maher and Pádraic Maher, midfielder Shane McGrath and forwards John O'Dwyer, Patrick Maher and Séamus Callanan.

Cathal Barrett was also named as the All Stars Young Hurler of the Year.

== Retirements ==
On 26 November forward John O'Brien announced his retirement from inter-county hurling. In a released statement O'Brien said "I wish to announce my retirement from the Tipperary Hurling team. It has been an honour to have represented my county at senior level since my debut in 2001. I would like to thank everyone who has supported me and made it possible for me to play, most importantly my family and friends, my club Toomevara, the management and backroom teams throughout those years which are too many to mention and also the Tipperary public. I have made many great friends over those years and I would like to wish the current panel and management team the very best of luck." In a statement, the Tipperary County Board thanked O’Brien saying "Tipperary County Board would like to thank John O’Brien for his great contribution to Tipperary hurling over a long number of years, having represented the county at minor, U21 and senior levels and won two All Ireland senior hurling medals as well as five Munster senior hurling medals, We wish him the very best for the future."

Eoin Kelly announced his retirement from inter-county hurling on 1 December 2014. Speaking to RTÉ Sport, Kelly said "Everyone has their time in the county jersey and my time has come now, I'm happy with the decision I have made in that now is the time to walk away. This season I had very limited game time and I'm also aware that Tipperary have a good up and coming team now". Kelly finished his career as the third highest scorer in championship history with a total of 21-368, in 63 senior appearances behind only Kilkenny's Henry Shefflin and Eddie Keher.

== 2015 season ==
In October 2014, Eamon O'Shea confirmed that he will stay on for a a third year as Tipperary manager. It was also confirmed that Michael Ryan would succeed Eamon O'Shea as manager on a two-year term after the conclusion of the 2015 season. Declan Fanning will also join the back-room team for 2015 as a selector.
