= 2013 Tipperary county hurling team season =

Tipperary county hurling team
2013 season
Manager	Eamon O'Shea
All-Ireland SHC	Phase 2 of Qualifiers
Munster SHC	Semi-finalists
National League	Runners Up
Top scorer Championship	John O'Dwyer (1-06)
Highest SHC attendance	23,307 (v Kilkenny)
Lowest SHC attendance	19,507 (v Limerick)
Colours

The 2013 season was Eamon O'Shea's first year as manager of the Tipperary senior hurling team. On 25 September 2012, he succeeded Declan Ryan as manager. A panel of 26 players was announced in December 2012 to prepare for the Allianz Hurling League. In February Shane McGrath was appointed as captain for the 2013 season.

Tipperary's first Championship game came against Limerick on 9 June, where they were defeated 1–18 to 1–15 at the Gaelic Grounds.

In phase 2 of the All-Ireland qualifiers on 6 July 2013, Tipperary were eliminated from championship after a 1–14 to 0–20 defeat to Kilkenny at Nowlan Park.

On 17 October, goalkeeper Brendan Cummins announced his retirement from the Tipperary hurling team after 20 years and 73 championship appearances.

== 2013 senior hurling management team ==
Name	Position	Club
Eamon O'Shea	Manager	Kilruane McDonaghs
Michael Ryan	Assistant Manager	Upperchurch-Drombane
Paudie O’Neill	Coach	St Mary's

=== 2013 Squad ===
The following players made their senior debut in 2013.

- Kieran Bergin
- John O'Dwyer
- Thomas Hamill
- Jason Forde

Number	Player	Position	Local Club
1	Brendan Cummins	Goalkeeper	Ballybacon-Grange
2	Conor O'Brien	Right corner back	Éire Óg, Annacarty
3	Paul Curran	Full back	Mullinahone
4	Mickey Cahill	Left corner back	Thurles Sarsfields
5	Thomas Stapleton	Right half back	Templederry
6	Conor O'Mahoney	Centre half back	Newport
7	Pádraic Maher	Left half back	Thurles Sarsfields
8	Brendan Maher	Midfield	Borris-Ileigh
9	Shane McGrath(C)	Midfield	Ballinahinch
10	Pa Bourke	Right half forward	Thurles Sarsfields
11	Patrick 'Bonner' Maher	Centre half forward	Lorrha-Dorrha
12	Lar Corbett	Left half forward	Thurles Sarsfields
13	Brian O'Meara	Right corner forward	Kilruane MacDonagh's
14	John O'Brien	Full forward	Toomevara
15	Noel McGrath	Left corner forward	Loughmore-Castleiney
16	Darren Gleeson	Goalkeeper	Portroe
17	Shane Bourke	Left corner forward	J.K. Bracken's
18	Séamus Callanan	Right half forward	Drom-Inch
19	Eoin Kelly	Full forward	Mullinahone
20	Donagh Maher	Right corner back	Burgess
21	Shane Maher	Right half back	Burgess
22	John O'Keeffe	Left half back	Clonoulty-Rossmore
23	John O'Neill	Left corner forward	Clonoulty-Rossmore
24	Gearóid Ryan	Left half forward	Templederry
25	Paddy Stapleton	Right corner back	Borris-Ileigh
26	James Woodlock	Midfield	Drom-Inch
27	Timmy Hammersley	Right corner forward	Clonoulty-Rossmore
28	Johnny Ryan	Midfield	Drom-Inch
29	Seán Curran	Left half forward	Mullinahone
30	David Young	Left half back	Toomevara

== 2013 Waterford Crystal Cup ==
Defending champions Tipperary faced Clare in the final under lights in Thurles on 9 February, with Clare winning by 1–21 to 1–13.

27 January
Quarter-final

Tipperary	0-22 - 1-9	Limerick
J Ryan (4f, 1 65), E Kelly (4f) & B O’Meara (1f), 0-5 each, T Hammersley 0-3, S McGrath 0-2, J O’Dwyer and J O’Neill 0-1 each.	Report	S Dowling 1-3 (1-0 pen, 0-2f), G O’Mahoney 0-2f, N Maher 0-2, J Ryan and S Hickey 0-1 each.

Nenagh
Referee: C Lyons (Cork)

3 February
Semi-final

Tipperary	1-20 - 2-12	Limerick Institute of Technology
J O’Dwyer 0-7 (2f, 2 65s); J Forde, J O’Neill 0-3 each; M Heffernan 1-0; S McGrath, J McLoughney (1f) 0-2 each; J O’Brien, C Coughlan, S Bourke 0-1 each.	Report	G Guilfoyle 2-10 (1-9f); J Guilfoyle, S Collins 0-1 each.

Dolla
Referee: P Casey (Waterford)
10 February
Final

Clare	1-21 - 1-13	Tipperary
C Ryan 0-9 (7f, 1 ’65′), T Kelly 0-5, S O’Donnell 1-1, S Morey, F Lynch 0-2 each, E Barrett, A O’Neill 0-1 each.	Report	E Kelly 0-6 (5f), P Maher 1-0, S Bourke, S Callanan (1f) 0-2, B O’Meara, J O’Brien, N McGrath (f) 0-1 each.

Semple Stadium
Referee: G O’Connell (Cork)

== 2013 National Hurling League ==
Tipperary reached the semi-final stage of the hurling league and defeated Dublin by 4–20 to 0–17 at Semple Stadium on 21 April. As a contest the match was effectively over within the first 10 minutes with Tipperary leading by eight points, 2–3 to 0–1 with an early goal from Shane Bourke and a further goal from Patrick Maher. Séamus Callanan scored a third goal from a penalty to leave the half time score at 3–11 to 0–8. A fourth goal came in the last minute of the game from substitute Michael Heffernan after a mistake from the Dublin goalkeeper. Tipperary were defeated by Kilkenny in the final by 2–17 to 0–20 on 5 May in Nowlan Park. Michael Fennelly scored two goals and three points in the first half as Kilkenny led by 2–07 to 0–11. In the second half Lar Corbett and JJ Delaney were sent off in the 46th minute after they wrestled each other on the ground near the Kilkenny goal.

=== Results ===
23 February 2013 Round 1	Cork	0-26 - 1-11	Tipperary	Páirc Uí Rinn, Cork
19:00	P Horgan (0-13, 10f), D Kearney (0-3), S Moylan (0-2), C Joyce (0-1), L O'Farrell (0-1), L McLoughlin (0-1), C McCarthy (0-1), W Egan (0-1), P O'Sullivan (0-1), C Lehane (0-1), M Walsh (0-1).	Report	J O'Dwyer (0-3), N McGrath (0-3f), E Kelly (1-0), J Forde (0-2), L Corbett (0-2), A Ryan (0-1).	Attendance: 6,381; Referee: B Kelly (Westmeath)

10 March 2013 Round 2	Tipperary	2-17 - 1-19	Kilkenny	Semple Stadium, Thurles
14:00	E Kelly (0-9, 7f, 1'65), L Corbett (1-1), J O'Dwyer (1-0), P Bourke (0-2, 1f), P Maher (0-1), B Maher (0-1), N McGrath (0-1), S Bourke (0-1), S Callanan (0-1).	Report	R Power (0-9, 8f, '65), R Hogan (1-2), E Larkin (0-3, 1 sl), P Hogan (0-2, 1f), C Fennelly (0-1), M Ruth (0-1), A Fogarty (0-1).	Attendance: 5,697; Referee: M Wadding

18 March 2013 Round 3	Galway	1-20 - 4-22	Tipperary	Pearse Stadium, Galway
14:00	J Canning (1-10, 1-7fs), D Glennon (0-02), N Healy (0-02), D Hayes (0-02), A Harte (0-02), I Tannian (0-01), C Donnellan (0-01).	Report	J O'Dwyer (1-06), S Callanan (0-07, 4fs, 265s), S Bourke (1-02), L Corbett (1-01), B Maher (1-00), J Woodlock (0-03), C O'Mahony (0-01), J Forde (0-01), S McGrath (0-01).	Referee: B Gavin (Offaly)

24 March 2013 Round 4	Waterford	1-14 - 0-16	Tipperary	Walsh Park, Waterford
14:30	J Barron (1-01), M O’Neill (0-04, 0-04f), P Mahony (0-04, 0-04f), J Dillon (0-02), K Moran (0-01), B O’Halloran (0-01), M Shanahan (0-01).	Report	S Callanan (0-10, 0-04f, 0-01 '65'), B O’Meara (0-02), S McGrath (0-01), N McGrath (0-01), S Bourke (0-01), L Corbett (0-01).	Referee: C McAllister (Cork)

31 March 2013 Round 5	Tipperary	3-19 - 1-14	Clare	Semple Stadium, Thurles
15:00	E Kelly 2-8 (1-6 frees); S Bourke 0-4; L Corbett 1-1; N McGrath 0-3; B Maher 0-2; M Cahill 0-1 each.	Report	Colin Ryan 0-8 (7 frees, 1 65); T Kelly 1-1; J Conlan 0-2; S Morey, Conor Ryan, F Lynch 0-1 each.	Attendance: 5,459; Referee: J Owens (Westmeath)

21 April 2013 Semi-final	Tipperary	4-20 - 0-17	Dublin	Semple Stadium, Thurles
14:00	S Callanan (1-07, 1-0 pen, 0-2f, 1 65), S Bourke (1-01), J Forde (0-04, 1 sl), M Heffernan (1-00), Patrick Maher (1-00), P Bourke (0-03), N McGrath (0-03), S McGrath (0-01), L Corbett (0-01).	Report	D Sutcliffe (0-04), P Ryan (0-04, 3f, 1 65), D Treacy (0-03, 1f), D O’Callaghan (0-02), S Durkin (0-02), J Boland (0-01), C Keaney (0-01).	Referee: B Gavin (Offaly)

5 May 2013 Final	Kilkenny	2-17 — 0-20	Tipperary	Nowlan Park, Kilkenny
15:30		Report		Attendance: 21,447; Referee: B Kelly (Westmeath)

=== Division 1A ===
NHL semi-finals Relegated team

Team	Pld	W	D	L	F	A	Diff	Pts
Tipperary	5	3	0	2	10-85	4-93	10	6
Kilkenny	5	3	0	2	6-81	8-71	4	6
Galway	5	2	1	2	7-71	6-81	-5	5
Waterford	5	2	1	2	3-72	4-75	-6	5
Cork	5	1	2	2	6-78	4-80	4	4
Clare	5	2	0	3	4-86	10-73	-5	4

== 2013 Munster Senior Hurling Championship ==
9 June 2013 Semi-final	Limerick	1-18 - 1-15	Tipperary	Gaelic Grounds
16:00	D Hannon 0-09 (5f, 1 65), S Tobin 1-01, D O'Grady 0-03, S Dowling 0-02 (1f), D Breen, J Ryan & N Moran 0-01 each.	Report	J O'Dwyer 1-03, S Callanan 0-04f, J O'Brien 0-03, E Kelly 0-02 (1f), B Maher, N McGrath & P Bourke 0-01 each.	Attendance: 19,507; Referee: B Gavin (Offaly)

=== Phase 2 ===
6 July 2013
Phase 2

Kilkenny	0-20 - 1-14	Tipperary
E Larkin 0-11 (8f), R Hogan, W Walsh 0-3 each; R Power 0-2, C Fennelly 0-1.	Report	E Kelly 0-5 (5f, 1 '65), L Corbett 1-0, J O'Dwyer 0-3, S Callanan 0-2, J O'Brien, N McGrath, K Bergin, J Woodlock 0-1 each.

Nowlan Park
Attendance: 23,307
Referee: B Gavin (Offaly)

The game was shown live on TV3. A crowd of 23,307 attended the game in Nowlan Park in Kilkenny on a sunny Saturday evening. The sides were level at half-time on a 1–06 to 0–09 with Lar Corbett getting the goal for Tipperary after 14 minutes when he finished with a shot to corner of the net when the ball broke to him from ten yards out. Corbett was forced off with a hamstring injury after 28 minutes. Henry Shefflin came on as a substitute for Kilkenny with five minutes remaining as they ran out winners by three points. The game was Brendan Cummins's last match for Tipperary.
