= Denis Maher =

Irish hurler

Personal information
- Native name: Denis Ó Meachair (Irish)
- Born: 9 July 1991 (age 35) Thurles, Ireland
- Height: 1.90 m (6 ft 3 in)

Sport
- Sport: Hurling
- Position: Right Half Forward
Club
- Years: Club
- 2008-: Thurles Sarsfields
Club titles
- Tipperary titles: 7
- Munster titles: 1
Inter-county
Years	County	Apps (scores)
2014-	Tipperary	7 (0-3)

Denis Maher (born 9 July 1991) is an Irish hurler. He plays hurling with his local club Thurles Sarsfields and with the Tipperary senior inter-county team since 2014.

He played Minor Hurling for Tipperary in 2008 and 2009 and was a member of the Under-21 team in 2010, 2011 and 2012 winning a Munster and all Ireland final in 2010.

In February 2014, Maher scored 2–2 against Clare in the 2014 Waterford Crystal Cup final as Tipperary won by 14 points.

Maher made his championship debut for Tipperary on 1 June 2014 in the Munster Championship against Limerick, coming on in the 62nd minute and scoring a point in a 2–18 to 2–16 defeat.

== Honours ==
=== Thurles Sarsfields ===
- Tipperary Senior Hurling Championship (7):2009, 2010, 2012, 2014, 2015, 2016, 2017
- Munster Senior Club Hurling Championship (1): 2012

=== Tipperary ===
- Munster Under-21 Hurling Championship
  - Runners Up (2): 2012
- 2014 Waterford Crystal Cup
