= Darren Gleeson =

Irish hurler and manager

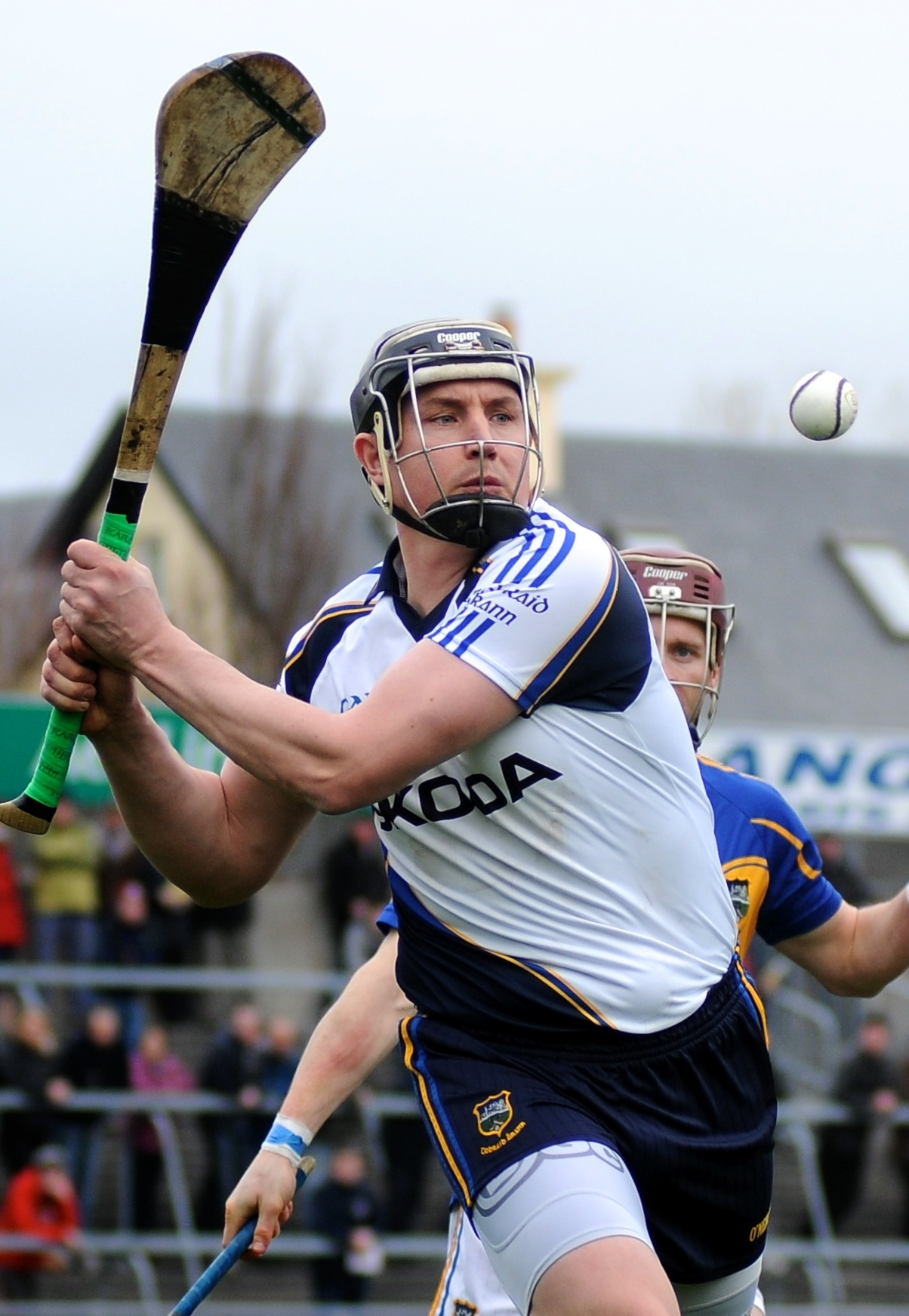
- Gleeson playing for Tipperary in 2014

Personal information
- Native name: Darrin Ó Gliasáin (Irish)
- Born: 19 March 1981 (age 45) Portroe, County Tipperary, Ireland
- Occupation: Self Employed
- Height: 6 ft 3 in (191 cm)

Sport
- Sport: Hurling
- Position: Goalkeeper
Club
- Years: Club
- 1997–: Portroe
Club titles
- Tipperary titles: 0
College
- Years: College
- Carlow Institute of Technology
Inter-county*
Years	County	Apps (scores)
2008–2017	Tipperary	20 (0–0)
Inter-county titles
- Munster titles: 6
- All-Irelands: 2
- NHL: 1
- All Stars: 1
- *Inter County team apps and scores correct as of 17:39, 24 July 2015.

Darren Gleeson (born 19 March 1981) is an Irish hurler and manager who plays for Tipperary Senior Championship club Portroe and, most recently, managed the Laois senior hurling team. He played for the Tipperary senior hurling team for 10 seasons, during which time he usually lined out as a goalkeeper.

== Playing career ==
=== Portroe ===
Gleeson plays his club hurling with Portroe.

In 2012, he won a North Tipperary championship medal following a 3–16 to 1–19 defeat of Toomevara.

=== Tipperary ===
==== Under-21 ====
Gleeson first played for Tipperary as a member of the under-21 team during the 2002 Munster Championship when he served as sub-goalkeeper to team captain Damien Young. On 8 August 2002, he was listed amongst the substitutes when Tipperary drew 3–9 to 2–12 with Limerick in the Munster U21HC final. Gleeson was again amongst the substitutes when Tipperary suffered a 1–20 to 2–14 defeat in the replay on 21 August 2002.

==== Senior ====
In 2008, Gleeson joined the Tipperary senior hurling team as understudy to regular 'keeper Brendan Cummins. He was an unused substitute as Tipperary claimed that year's National Hurling League following a 3–18 to 3–16 victory. Gleeson was later included on Tipperary's championship panel and collected a Munster SHC medal as a non-playing substitute following a 2–21 to 0–19 defeat of Clare.

Gleeson made his competitive debut the following season in a league game against Galway. Later that year, he made his championship debut as a ten-minute blood sub for Brendan Cummins in a 1–19 to 0–19 Munster quarter-final defeat of Cork.

Gleeson was still a member of the Tipperary senior hurling panel in 2010. That year he collected an All-Ireland SHC medal as a non-playing substitute following Tipp's 4–17 to 1–18 defeat of Kilkenny.

The following year Gleeson came on as substitute for Cummins after 64 minutes of the years's provincial decider. He won a Munster SHC medal as a result of Tipp's 7–19 to 0–19 trouncing of Waterford.

Gleeson started the 2014 season as first choice goalkeeper for Tipperary due to the retirement of Brendan Cummins at the end of the 2013 season. He made his first championship start for Tipperary on 1 June 2014 against Limerick in a 2–18 to 2–16 defeat in the 2014 Munster SHC.

On 17 August 2014, Tipperary defeated Cork by 2–18 to 1–11 in the All-Ireland SHC semi-final to reach the 2014 All-Ireland Senior Hurling Championship final.

Former Cork goalkeeper Donal Óg Cusack, speaking on The Sunday Game highlights programme on the night of the semi-final match, said that in his opinion Gleeson had given the greatest ever display of tactical puckouts in the game, stating: "Darren Gleeson gave the greatest display of tactical puckouts ever seen... I want to put it on record: it was the greatest display of puckouts ever but the Cork defending was poor".

Gleeson started his first All-Ireland SHC final on 7 September 2014 against Kilkenny in a match that finished in a draw. Kilkenny defeated Tipperary in the replay three weeks later.

In October 2014, Gleeson won his first All Stars Award after a successful 2014 campaign in which Tipperary reached the All-Ireland SHC final.

On 4 September 2016, Gleeson won his second All-Ireland SHC title when Tipperary defeated Kilkenny by a score of 2–29 to 2–20 in the final.

In October 2017, Gleeson announced his retirement from inter-county hurling, citing work and family commitments as the reasons.

== Managerial career ==
=== Antrim ===
On 9 September 2019, Gleeson was ratified as manager of the Antrim senior hurling team.

He led the side to the 2020 National Hurling League Division 2A title when they overcame Kerry by a score of 2–23 to 2–20 in the final on 18 October 2020.

Antrim then won the 2020 Joe McDonagh Cup after a 0–22 to 1–17 win over Kerry in the final at Croke Park.

On 9 May 2021, Antrim unexpectedly defeated Clare by a score of 1–21 to 0–22 in the opening round of the 2021 National Hurling League.

=== Laois ===
In August 2024, Gleeson was ratified as manager of the Laois senior hurling team. However, on 16 November, he announced his departure from the role due to medical advice, after cancer was located when he broke his upper arm.

== Personal life ==
On 4 May 2016, it was reported that the Central Bank of Ireland had banned Gleeson from acting as a financial adviser.

In court in January 2017, Gleeson denied the charges of stealing €32,000 from a financial services client, pleading not guilty to two counts of stealing a total of €32,000 in 2013.

On 27 June 2017, Gleeson was given a three-and-a-half-year suspended prison sentence after admitting an offence of obtaining €10,000 by deception from an elderly man in 2013.

== Career statistics ==
=== As a player ===
Team	Year	National League			Munster		All-Ireland		Total	
Team	Year	Division	Apps	Score	Apps	Score	Apps	Score	Apps	Score
Tipperary	2008	Division 1B	0	0–0	0	0–0	0	0–0	0	0–0
Tipperary	2009	Division 1	1	0–0	1	0–0	0	0–0	2	0–0
Tipperary	2010	Division 1	3	0–0	0	0–0	0	0–0	3	0–0
Tipperary	2011	Division 1	2	0–0	1	0–0	0	0–0	3	0–0
Tipperary	2012	Division 1A	2	0–0	0	0–0	0	0–0	2	0–0
Tipperary	2013	Division 1A	4	0–1	0	0–0	0	0–0	4	0–1
Tipperary	2014	Division 1A	6	1–0	1	0–0	6	0–0	13	1–0
Tipperary	2015	Division 1A	5	0–1	2	0–0	1	0–0	8	0–1
Tipperary	2016	Division 1A	5	0–0	3	0–0	2	0–0	10	0–0
Tipperary	2017	Division 1A	4	0–0	1	0–0	2	0–0	7	0–0
Total			32	1–2	9	0–0	11	0–0	52	1–2

=== As a manager ===
As of match played 28 November 2020.

Managerial league-championship record by team and tenure
Team	From	To	Record				
Team	From	To	P	W	D	L	Win %
Antrim	9 September 2019		10	8	2	0	80.0

== Honours ==
=== Player ===
Portroe

- North Tipperary Senior Hurling Championship (1): 2012

Tipperary

- All-Ireland Senior Hurling Championship (2): 2010, 2016
- Munster Senior Hurling Championship (6): 2008, 2009, 2011, 2012, 2015, 2016
- National Hurling League (1): 2008

Awards

- All-Star (1): 2014

=== Manager ===
Antrim

- National League Division 2A (1): 2020
- Joe McDonagh Cup (2): 2020, 2022

Sporting positions
Preceded by Neal Peden	Antrim Senior Hurling Manager; 2019-2024	Succeeded by Davy Fitzgerald
Preceded by William Maher	Laois Senior Hurling Manager; 2024	Succeeded by Tommy Fitzgerald
Achievements
Preceded by Eddie Brennan	Joe McDonagh Cup winning manager 2020	Succeeded by Tom Mullally
Preceded by Tom Mullally	Joe McDonagh Cup winning manager 2022	Succeeded by Tom Mullally
