= Eamon O'Shea =

Tipperary and Dublin hurler

Éamonn O'Shea
Personal information
- Native name: Éamonn Ó Sé (Irish)
- Born: 1958 (age 67–68) Cloughjordan, County Tipperary, Ireland
- Occupations: Professor of Economics; Epidemiologist

Sport
- Sport: Hurling
- Position: Right half forward
Club
- Years: Club
- Kilruane MacDonagh's
Club titles
- Tipperary titles: 4
- Munster titles: 1
- All-Ireland Titles: 1
Inter-county
| Years | County | Apps (scores) |
| 1979–1983 1984–1985 1986 | Tipperary; Dublin; Tipperary | 4 (0–8); 2 (0–0); 1 (0–0) |
Inter-county titles
- Munster titles: 0
- All-Irelands: 0
- NHL: 1
- All Stars: 0

Dr. Eamon O'Shea (born 1958) is an Irish former hurler who played as a right wing-forward at senior level for the Tipperary and Dublin county teams.

O'Shea began his senior career during the 1979 championship and was a regular player on the inter-county scene until his retirement after the 1986 championship. During that time he won one National Hurling League winners' medal.

At club level O'Shea is an All-Ireland medalist with Kilruane MacDonagh's. In addition to this he has also won one Munster and four county club championship medals.

A former coach of the Tipperary senior hurling team, O'Shea was appointed manager of the team in September 2012.

O'Shea is currently based in Galway and works as the head of Economics at NUI Galway.

== Playing career ==
=== Club ===
O'Shea played for the Kilruane MacDonagh's club.

He was just out of the minor grade in 1977 when he captured his first championship medal at senior level following a 1–5 to 0–5 defeat of Borris-Ileigh in a replay. It was the first of three county championship winners' medal in succession for O'Shea. Four-in-a-row proved beyond the club as Roscrea won by a single point in the 1980 championship decider.

After a brief absence Kilruane MacDonagh's returned to the summit of Tipperary hurling again in 1986. A 2–11 to 0–10 defeat of Roscrea gave O'Shea his fourth championship medal. He subsequently added a Munster winners' medal to his collection following a draw and a replay victory over Blackrock. An All-Ireland final appearance for the club soon followed, with Buffers Alley providing the opposition. Kilruane fought back and overwhelmed the Wexford side in the final quarter to claim a 1–15 to 2–10 victory and give O'Shea an All-Ireland club winners' medal.

=== Inter-county ===
O'Shea's inter-county career began in 1976 when he joined the Tipperary minor hurling panel. He won a Munster medal in this grade in his debut year following a 5–10 to 5–6 defeat of Limerick. This provincial success was later converted into an All-Ireland success following a 2–20 to 1–7 trouncing of Kilkenny.

O'Shea later moved onto the Tipperary under-21 team. He won a Munster medal in this grade in 1978, however, All-Ireland success eluded Tipp that year.

In 1979 O'Shea was in his final year with the under-21 team. He added a second Munster medal to his collection that year before later claiming an All-Ireland medal following a 2–12 to 1–9 defeat of Galway.

By this stage O'Shea had already joined the Tipperary senior hurling team. He won a National Hurling League medal during the 1978–79 season following a 3–15 to 0–8 trouncing of Galway in the decider.

The rest of O'Shea's inter-county career coincided with a barren spell for Tipperary's senior team. He joined the Dublin team for two unsuccessful seasons in 1984 and 1985, however, he finished his career with Tipperary following the 1986 championship.

== Coaching and managerial career ==
=== Tipperary (coach) ===
When Liam Sheedy was appointed manager of the Tipperary senior team in 2007 O'Shea joined his backroom team as coach. During his three-year tenure Tipperary returned to the big time. In his first season, he coached the team to National League and Munster titles.

Under Sheedy and O'Shea Tipperary retained their Munster crown in 2009 before later lining out in the All-Ireland decider. On that occasion Tipperary put up a good fight, however, Kilkenny retained their title for a record-breaking fourth year in succession.

In 2010 Tipperary surrendered their Munster crown, however, they still reached the All-Ireland final via the back-door. Another exciting game with Kilkenny developed, however, on this occasion Tipp denied 'the Cats' their "drive-for-five" with a 4–17 to 1–18 victory. Following this win against Kilkenny Sheedy and his management team, including O'Shea, stepped down from their positions.

=== Tipperary (manager) ===
On 25 September 2012 O'Shea succeeded Declan Ryan as manager of the Tipperary senior team. His first game in charge was on 6 January 2013 in a 3–23 to 2–15 against UCC in a challenge match. In February he guided Tipperary to the final of the 2013 Waterford Crystal Cup against Clare, with Clare winning by 1–21 to 1–13. In April 2013, Tipperary reached the final of the 2013 National Hurling League where they were defeated 2–17 to 0–20 by Kilkenny in Nowlan Park on 5 May.

His first Championship game came against Limerick on 9 June 2013, where Tipperary were defeated 1–18 to 1–15 at the Gaelic Grounds. In phase 2 of the All-Ireland qualifiers on 6 July 2013, Tipperary were eliminated from the championship after a 1–14 to 0–20 defeat to Kilkenny at Nowlan Park. In October 2013, O'Shea was given another two years as Tipperary senior hurling manager after a county board meeting. In February 2014, Tipperary won the 2014 Waterford Crystal Cup after a 4–22 to 3–11 win against Clare. In August 2014, Tipperary qualified for the 2014 All-Ireland Final after a ten-point win against Cork in Croke Park. The final against Kilkenny finished in a draw with Kilkenny winning the replay on 27 September on a 2–17 to 2–14 scoreline.

In October 2014, O'Shea confirmed that he would stay on for a third and final year as Tipperary manager. On 21 June 2015, O'Shea recorded his first Munster Senior Hurling Championship win as manager as Tipperary defeated Limerick in the Munster semi-final on a 4-23 to 1-16 scoreline. O'Shea won his first Munster Senior title with Tipperary on 12 July 2015, as they defeated Waterford in the Munster Final.

On 16 August 2015, Tipperary lost to Galway by a point in the All-Ireland Semi-Final. The match was O'Shea's last game as Tipperary manager as he had planned to leave the position at the end of the 2015 Championship.

=== Galway ===
O'Shea worked with Galway during Henry Shefflin's last year as manager in 2024.

== Managerial statistics ==
| Team | From | To | National League | | | | Championship | | | | Overall Total | | | |
| Team | From | To | G | W | D | L | G | W | D | L | G | W | D | L |
|---|---|---|---|---|---|---|---|---|---|---|---|---|---|---|
| Tipperary | 25 September 2012 | 16 August 2015 | 15 | 8 | 0 | 7 | 12 | 6 | 1 | 5 | 24 | 12 | 1 | 11 |

Sporting positions
| Preceded by Declan Ryan | Tipperary Senior Hurling Manager; 2012–2015 | Succeeded by Mick Ryan |
