= Michael Ryan (hurler, born 1970) =

Irish hurler and manager

Personal information
- Native name: Mícheál Ó Riain (Irish)
- Born: 1970 (age 55–56) Upperchurch, County Tipperary, Ireland
- Occupation: Glanbia employee
- Height: 6 ft 1 in (185 cm)

Sport
- Sport: Hurling
- Position: Left corner-back
Club
- Years: Club
- Upperchurch–Drombane
Club titles
- Tipperary titles: 0
Inter-county*
Years	County	Apps (scores)
1991–2000	Tipperary	24 (0-00)
Inter-county titles
- Munster titles: 2
- All-Irelands: 1
- NHL: 2
- All Stars: 0
- *Inter County team apps and scores correct as of 01:18, 29 October 2014.

Michael Ryan (born 4 February 1970) is an Irish hurling manager and former player. He was the manager of the Tipperary senior team from November 2015 until August 2018.

Born in Upperchurch, County Tipperary, Ryan first arrived on the inter-county scene as a dual player at the age of seventeen, before later joining the under-21 teams in both codes. After joining the senior football team during the 1989 championship, he made his senior hurling debut during the 1991 championship. Ryan went on to play a key role for the team, winning one All-Ireland medal, two Munster medals and one National Hurling League medal. He was an All-Ireland runner-up on one occasion.

As a member of the Munster inter-provincial team on a number of occasions, Ryan won two Railway Cup medals. At club level he was a one-time championship medallist in the intermediate grade with Upperchurch–Drombane.

Throughout his career Ryan made 24 championship appearances for Tipperary. He retired from inter-county hurling following the conclusion of the 2000 championship.

In retirement from playing Ryan became involved in team management and coaching. He served as a selector under Liam Sheedy on the Tipperary senior team between 2008 and 2010, before later being appointed assistant manager under Eamon O'Shea. In October 2014, it was confirmed that Ryan will succeed O'Shea as the Tipperary manager after the conclusion of the 2015 season. In September 2016, in Ryan's first year in charge, Tipperary defeated Kilkenny in the 2016 All-Ireland Senior Hurling final by 2-29 to 2-20.

== Playing career ==
=== Club ===
Ryan enjoyed a lengthy club career as a dual player with Upperchurch–Drombane.

In 1998 he enjoyed the biggest success off his club career when he won a championship medal in the intermediate grade.

=== Inter-county ===
==== Minor ====
Ryan first played for Tipperary as a dual minor in 1987. After losing out to Cork in the provincial football championship, he later collected a Munster medal with the hurlers following a 2–11 to 1–9 defeat of the same opposition. Tipperary later qualified for the All-Ireland final against Offaly with Ryan lining out at right wing-back. The game was a close affair, with Tipperary eventually losing out by 2–8 to 0–12.

==== Under-21 ====
Two years later in 1989, Ryan had joined the Tipperary under-21 teams in both codes. He won his first Munster medal with the hurlers following a remarkable 5–16 to 1–6 thrashing of Limerick. Tipperary later faced old rivals Offaly in the subsequent All-Ireland decider. A huge crowd at O'Moore Park of over 30,000 saw one of the great finals, as Tipperary narrowly triumphed by 4–12 to 3–11. It was a first All-Ireland medal for Ryan.

Ryan added a second Munster under-21 medal to his collection in 1990 as Tipperary defeated Limerick by 2–21 to 1–11. Kilkenny provided the opposition in the subsequent All-Ireland final, however, Tipperary were defeated by 2–11 to 1–11.

==== Senior ====
Ryan made his senior championship debut for Tipperary on 9 June 1991 when he came on as a substitute in a 2–18 to 0–10 Munster semi-final defeat of Limerick. He started the subsequent Munster decider against Cork on the bench, but was once again introduced as a substitute. Although that game ended in a draw, Ryan impressed the selectors and was rewarded with a starting berth for the replay. A 4–19 to 4–15 victory gave Ryan his first Munster medal. The subsequent All-Ireland decider saw a first clash between Tipperary and Kilkenny in twenty years.

The opening thirty-five minutes saw both sides trade score-for-score, however, a controversial 20-metre free, miss-hit by Michael Cleary, landed in the net and gave Tipperary a lead which they never surrendered. The final score of 1–16 to 0–15 resulted in a Tipp victory and a first All-Ireland medal for Ryan.

After surrendering their titles in 1992, Tipperary bounced back the following year. A 3–27 to 2–12 trouncing of Clare gave Ryan a second Munster medal.

In 1994 Ryan added a National Hurling League medal to his collection following a 2–14 to 0–12 defeat of Galway.

Tipperary went into decline following this and suffered a number of championship defeats, however, the introduction of the new "back-door system" saw Ryan's side reach the All-Ireland final again in 1997. Clare provided the opposition in the first all-Munster All-Ireland decider. The game itself was one of the best of the decade. Clare were well on top for much of the game, however, Liam Cahill and Eugene O'Neill scored twice for Tipperary in the last ten minutes. John Leahy missed a goal chance in the last minute while another Tipp point was controversially ruled wide. At the full-time whistle Clare had won by a single point by 0–20 to 2–13.

Ryan retired from inter-county hurling following Tipperary's exit from the 2000 championship.

=== Inter-provincial ===
Ryan also had the honour of lining out for Munster in the inter-provincial series of games. After defeat in 1993 and 1994, Ryan secured his first Railway Cup medal in 1995 following a narrow 0–13 to 1–9 defeat of Ulster.

Two years later in 1997 Ryan won a second Railway Cup medal as Leinster were defeated by 0–14 to 0–10.

== Managerial career ==
=== Tipperary ===
In 2007 Liam Sheedy was appointed manager of the Tipperary senior team with Ryan serving as a selector. Over the next three seasons Tipperary secured one All-Ireland title, two Munster titles and a National League title. The management team stepped down in 2010.

After two years out of management, Ryan was appointed assistant manager under Eamon O'Shea in 2012. In October 2014, it was confirmed that Ryan will succeed Eamon O'Shea as the Tipperary manager after the conclusion of the 2015 season. In November 2015, it was confirmed that Ryan will be assisted by former Tipperary player's John Madden as a selector and Declan Fanning as a coach.

On 22 May 2016, in Ryan's first Championship match as manager, Tipperary defeated Cork by 0-22 to 0-13 at Semple Stadium in the 2015 Munster Senior Hurling Championship quarter-final.

On 10 July 2016, Tipperary won the 2016 Munster Hurling Final against Waterford on a 5-19 to 0-13 scoreline. On 14 August 2016, Tipperary qualified for the 2016 All-Ireland Senior Hurling Championship Final after a 2-19 to 2-18 victory over Galway in the semi-final at Croke Park. On 4 September 2016, Tipperary won their 27th All-Ireland title after a 2-29 to 2-20 win against Kilkenny in the final.

On 22 April 2017, Tipperary lost the 2017 National Hurling League final to Galway on a 3-21 to 0-14 scoreline. Ryan described the defeat as the worst performance of his time in charge.

On 26 September 2017, it was confirmed that Ryan would continue as Tipperary manager on a new three-year term. On 2 August 2018, Ryan along with his management team stepped down after a disappointing year which saw Tipperary eliminated early from the championship.

=== Na Piarsaigh ===
In January 2019, Ryan was named as the new manager of Limerick club Na Piarsaigh.

== Career statistics ==
=== Manager ===
As of match played 12 March 2017.

Team	From	To	Munster League				National League				Munster				All-Ireland				Total				
Team	From	To	G	W	D	L	G	W	D	L	G	W	D	L	G	W	D	L	G	W	D	L	Win %
Tipperary	3 November 2015	2 August 2018	0	0	0	0	10	5	2	3	3	3	0	0	2	2	0	0	15	10	2	3	66

== Honours ==
=== Player ===
Upperchurch–Drombane

- Tipperary Intermediate Hurling Championship (1): 1998

Tipperary

- All-Ireland Senior Hurling Championship (1): 1991
- Munster Senior Hurling Championship (2): 1991, 1993
- National Hurling League (1): 1993–94
- All-Ireland Under-21 Hurling Championship (1): 1989
- Munster Under-21 Hurling Championship (2): 1989, 1990
- Munster Minor Hurling Championship (1): 1987

Munster

- Railway Cup (2): 1995, 1997

=== Selector ===
Tipperary

- All-Ireland Senior Hurling Championship (1): 2010
- Munster Senior Hurling Championship (3): 2008, 2009, 2014
- National Hurling League (1): 2008

=== Manager ===
Tipperary

- All-Ireland Senior Hurling Championship (1): 2016
- Munster Senior Hurling Championship (1): 2016

Individual

- Munster GAA Manager of the Year (1): 2016
- Tipperary Person of the Year (1): 2016

Sporting positions
Preceded by Éamonn O'Shea	Tipperary Senior Hurling Manager; 2015-2018	Succeeded by Liam Sheedy
Achievements
Preceded by Brian Cody	All-Ireland Senior Hurling Final winning manager 2016	Succeeded by Micheál Donoghue
