= 2014 Waterford Crystal Cup =

- Dates: 12 January 2014 – 2 February 2014
- Teams: 10
- Sponsor: Waterford Crystal
- Champions: Tipperary; James Woodlock (captain); Eamon O'Shea (manager)
- Runners-up: Clare; Patrick Donnellan (captain); Davy Fitzgerald (manager)

Tournament statistics
- Matches played: 10
- Goals scored: 37 (3.7 per match)

The 2014 Waterford Crystal Cup was the ninth staging of the Waterford Crystal Cup since its establishment in 2006. The competition began on 12 January 2014 and ended on 7 February 2014.

Clare were the defending champions but lost out to Tipperary by 4-22 to 3-11 in the final.

== Teams ==
A total of ten teams contested the 2014 Waterford Crystal Cup.

== Fixtures ==
=== Preliminary round ===
12 January

- UL 1-11 Waterford 0-10
- Limerick 10-17 IT Tralee 0-9
- Tipperary 3-20 LIT 0-5

=== Quarter-finals ===
19 January

- Kerry 0-8 Tipperary 2-16
- WIT 1-20 UL 2-30
- Clare 1-14 Limerick 0-11
- UCC 3-28 Mary I 2-14

=== Semi-finals ===
26 January

- Clare 2-28 UCC 1-4

2 February

- Tipperary 2-30 UL 0-22

=== Final ===
7 February
19:30
Final

Tipperary	4-22 - 3-11	Clare
S Callanan 0-9 (7fs), D Maher 2-2, M Heffernan 1-1, C Kenny 1-0, J Woodlock, R Gleeson, K Morris 0-2 each, C O’Brien (f), S Bourke, S O’Brien, T Stapleton 0-1 each	Report	T Kelly 1-2, J Conlon 1-1, C McGrath 1-0, C Ryan (2fs), C O’Connell (2fs) 0-3 each, P Duggan 0-2

Gaelic Grounds
Referee: J Sexton (Cork)
