= James Woodlock =

Irish hurler & coach (born 1986)

Personal information
- Native name: Séamus Uadlóg (Irish)
- Born: 24 March 1986 (age 40) Drom, County Tipperary, Ireland
- Occupation: Garda
- Height: 5 ft 10 in (178 cm)

Sport
- Sport: Hurling
- Position: Midfield
Club
- Years: Club
- Drom & Inch
Club titles
- Tipperary titles: 1
Inter-county*
Years	County	Apps (scores)
2006-2015	Tipperary	26 (0-15)
Inter-county titles
- Munster titles: 3
- All-Irelands: 0
- NHL: 1
- All Stars: 0
- *Inter County team apps and scores correct as of 23:08, 17 November 2015.

James Woodlock (born 24 March 1986) is an Irish hurler and coach who plays for Drom & Inch and is a former member of the Tipperary inter-county team. He primarily plays as a midfielder.

Born in Drom, County Tipperary, Woodlock was first introduced to hurling in his youth. He came to prominence at colleges level St. Joseph's College while later enjoying championship successes at underage level with the Drom-Inch club. A one-time championship medallist with the Drom-Inch senior team, Woodlock has also won numerous divisional medals.

Woodlock made his debut on the inter-county scene at the age of seventeen when he first linked up with the Tipperary minor team. After enjoying Munster success in this grade, he was later an All-Ireland runner-up with the under-21 team. Woodlock joined the senior team during the 2006 league. He went on to play a key role for Tipperary during a successful era, and won three Munster medals and one National Hurling League medal. He was an All-Ireland runner-up on three occasions.

As a member of the Munster inter-provincial team on a number of occasions, Woodlock never won a Railway Cup medal.

Throughout his career Woodlock made 26 championship appearances. He announced his retirement from inter-county hurling on 14 November 2015.

== Playing career ==
=== Club ===
In 2011 Woodlock was a key member of the club's senior team as Drom & Inch reached the championship decider. Clonoulty–Rossmore provided the opposition on that occasion, however, Drom & Inch claimed their first county club championship following a 1–19 to 2–14 victory.

=== Inter-county ===
Woodlock first came to prominence on the inter-county scene as a member of the Tipperary minor hurling team in 2003. He collected a Munster winners' medal that year following a 2–12 to 0–16 defeat of Cork. Woodlock's side, however, were later defeated by Galway in the All-Ireland semi-final.

Three years later in 2006 Woodlock was a key fixture on the Tipperary under-21 hurling team. He secured a Munster winners' medal in that grade following a 3–11 to 0–13 defeat of Cork. Tipp later qualified for the All-Ireland final against Kilkenny. After a thrilling 2-14 apiece draw, both sides met for a replay which Kilkenny narrowly won by 1–11 to 0–11.

Woodlock made his senior competitive debut for Tipperary in a National Hurling League game against Limerick in 2006.

By 2007 Woodlock became a regular member of the Tipperary starting fifteen. He made his championship debut against Limerick in the provincial series, however, it was a largely disappointing campaign for Tipp.

In 2008 Tipperary remained undefeated in the National League before meeting Galway in the final. In an exciting game Tipp emerged victorious by 3–18 to 3-16 and Woodlock collected his first National League winners' medal. Tipperary later reached the Munster final where they defeated a resurgent Clare team by 2–21 to 0–19. It was Woodlock's first Munster winners' medal. Tipperary were subsequently defeated in a tense All-Ireland semi-final by Waterford on a scoreline of 1–20 to 1–18.

Woodlock won his second Munster medal in 2009 as Tipp defeated Waterford by 4–14 to 2–16. After a six-week lay-off and a facile semi-final win over Limerick, Tipp qualified for an All-Ireland final meeting with Kilkenny. For much of the match it looked as if Tipp would pull off a shock and deny 'the Cats' a record-equaling four-in-a-row. Two quick goals in the space of a minute, one from a penalty by Henry Shefflin, sealed a 2–22 to 0–23 victory and defeat for Tipperary. O'Mahony later collected a second All-Star award. Woodlock was later nominated for an All-Star award.

In October 2009 Woodlock broke his right leg in four places after an accidental collision with inter-county team-mate Pádraic Maher in the Tipperary county final. This injury kept him out of hurling action for ten months.

Woodlock returned to championship hurling in 2011 when he came on as a substitute in Tipperary's two opening championship games.

In spite of an indifferent National League campaign, Tipperary were regarded as potential All-Ireland champions once again. Woodlock missed out on Tipperary's Munster championship success over Waterford.

== Coaching ==
In February 2021, Woodlock was named as the new manager of the Tipperary minor hurling team on a three-year term.

== Honours ==
=== Player ===
Drom & Inch

- Tipperary Senior Hurling Championship (1): 2011

Tipperary

- Munster Senior Hurling Championship (3): 2008, 2009, 2015
- National Hurling League (1): 2008
- Waterford Crystal Cup (1): 2014 (c)
- Munster Under-21 Hurling Championship (1): 2006
- Munster Minor Hurling Championship (1): 2003

=== Manager ===
Tipperary

- All-Ireland Minor Hurling Championship (2): 2022, 2024
- Munster Minor Hurling Championship (3): 2022, 2024, 2026

Sporting positions
Preceded by Paul Collins	Tipperary minor hurling team manager 2021-present	Succeeded by Incumbent
