= Michael Cahill (hurler) =

Tipperary hurler (born 1989)

Personal information
- Native name: Mícheál Ó Cathail (Irish)
- Born: 3 January 1989 (age 37) Thurles, County Tipperary
- Occupation: Student
- Height: 5 ft 11 in (180 cm)

Sport
- Sport: Hurling
- Position: Left Corner Back
Club
- Years: Club
- 2006–: Thurles Sarsfields
Club titles
- Tipperary titles: 7
- Munster titles: 1
Inter-county*
Years	County	Apps (scores)
2009–	Tipperary	21 (0–1)
Inter-county titles
- Munster titles: 4
- All-Irelands: 2
- All Stars: 1
- *Inter County team apps and scores correct as of 12:52, 31 October 2012.

Michael Cahill (born 3 January 1989) is an Irish hurler who currently plays as a left corner-back at senior level for the Tipperary county team.

Cahill made his first appearance for the team during the 2009 National League and has become a regular player over the last few seasons. During that time he has won two All-Ireland winners' medals, four Munster winners' medals and one All-Star award. He has ended up as an All-Ireland runner-up on three occasions.

At club level Cahill is a six-time county club championship medalist with Thurles Sarsfield's and has also won the Munster Senior Club Hurling Championship on one occasion.

== Playing career ==
=== Club ===
Cahill plays his club hurling with the famous Thurles Sarsfield's club and enjoyed much success as a dual player in various juvenile and under-age grades.

In 2006 he was just seventeen years-old when he made his senior championship debut for the club.

After losing the championship decider in 2008, Thurles Sarsfield's bounced back to return to the county final again the following year. By this stage Cahill was a regular member of the starting fifteen. A 0–14 to 0–5 trouncing of Drom-Inch gave him his first county club championship medal.

Thurles Sarsfield's made it two-in-a-row in 2010. A 1–16 to 1–7 defeat of Clonoulty-Rossmore gave Cahill a second championship medal.

After surrendering their title in 2011, Thurles Sarsfield's were back in the county decider again the following year. A 1–21 to 2–15 defeat of Drom-Inch gave Cahill his third championship medal in four seasons.

=== University ===
During his studies at University College Cork, Cahill was a regular on the university hurling team. In 2009 he won a Fitzgibbon Cup medal following a 2–17 to 0–14 defeat of the University of Limerick.

=== Minor and under-21 ===
Cahill first came to prominence on the inter-county scene as a member of the Tipperary minor hurling team. He enjoyed much success in this grade as Tipperary reached the All-Ireland decider via the "back-door" in 2006. Three-in-a-row hopefuls Galway provided the opposition, however, Tipp powered to 2–18 to 2–7 victory. It was Cahill's first All-Ireland medal in that grade.

In 2007 Cahill won a Munster medal at minor level following an 0–18 to 1–11 defeat of Cork. Both sides met again in the All-Ireland decider, however, Cork also failed on that occasion. A 3–14 to 2–11 victory gave Cahill a second successive All-Ireland medal.

Cahill subsequently joined the Tipperary under-21 team. He won a Munster medal in this grade in his debut season following a controversial one-point defeat of Clare. Tipp later reached the All-Ireland, however, Cahill's side were defeated by Kilkenny.

After surrendering their provincial crown in 2009, Tipperary bounced back the following year. A 1–22 to 1–17 defeat of Clare gave Cahill a second Munster medal. Tipp later played Galway in the All-Ireland final and went on to trounce the westerners by 5–22 to 0–12. It was Cahill's sole All-Ireland medal in that grade.

=== Senior ===
Cahill made his senior competitive debut for Tipperary in a National Hurling League game against Limerick in 2009, however, he remained on the periphery of the team for the remainder of that season.

Cahill made his championship debut in a ten-point defeat against Cork in 2010. Tipperray regrouped in the qualifiers and went on to reach a second successive All-Ireland decider. Kilkenny, a team chasing an unprecedented fifth successive championship, provided the opposition and a great game was expected. Tipperary got off to a great start which was bolstered by an early Lar Corbett goal. He subsequently completed a hat-trick of goals and Tipperary had a fourth by Noel McGrath to deny Kilkenny's drive-for-five and secure a remarkable and convincing 4–17 to 1–18 victory. It was Cahill's first All-Ireland winners' medal.

Tipperary returned as provincial kingpins once again in 2011. A 7–19 to 0–19 trouncing of Waterford in the southern decider gave Cahill his first Munster medal. For the third successive year, Tipperary faced off against Kilkenny in the All-Ireland final, however, on this occasion Kilkenny were slight underdogs going up against the new champions. Kilkenny started quickly and never surrendered the lead in the 2–17 to 1–16 victory. In spite of this defeat Cahill later picked up an All-Star award.

In spite of an indifferent National League campaign, Tipperary were regarded as potential All-Ireland champions once again. A 2–17 to 0–16 defeat of Waterford in the provincial decider gave Cahill a second successive Munster medal. Tipperary later faced a humiliating 4–24 to 1–15 defeat by eventual champions Kilkenny in the All-Ireland semi-final.

On 4 September 2016, Cahill won his second All-Ireland Senior hurling title when Tipperary defeated Kilkenny in the final by 2–29 to 2-20.

Cahill missed the 2019 season due to breaking his kneecap in a club training session in early summer.

=== Inter-provincial ===
Chill has also lined out with Munster in the Inter-provincial Championship.

== Honours ==
=== Team ===
Thurles Sarsfields

- Tipperary Senior Hurling Championship (7): 2009, 2010, 2012, 2014, 2015, 2016, 2017
- Munster Senior Club Hurling Championship (1): 2012

University College Cork

- Fitzgibbon Cup (1): 2009

Tipperary

- All-Ireland Senior Hurling Championship (2): 2010, 2016
- Munster Senior Hurling Championship (4): 2011, 2012, 2015, 2016
- All-Ireland Under-21 Hurling Championship (1): 2010
- Munster Under-21 Hurling Championship (2): 2008, 2010
- All-Ireland Minor Hurling Championship (1): 2006, 2007
- Munster Minor Hurling Championship (1): 2007

=== Individual ===
- All-Stars (1): 2011
