= 2018 Tipperary county hurling team season =

Tipperary county hurling team
2018 season
Manager	Michael Ryan
Captain	Pádraic Maher
All-Ireland SHC	Did not Qualify
Munster SHC	4th in Group Stage
National League	Runners-up
Top scorer Championship	Jason Forde (3-39)
Highest SHC attendance	22,456 (v Cork 27 May)
Lowest SHC attendance	10,237 (v Waterford 3 June)
Colours

The 2018 season was Michael Ryan's third and final year as manager of the Tipperary senior hurling team.

On 26 September 2017, it was confirmed that Michael Ryan would continue as Tipperary manager on a new three-year term alongside coach Declan Fanning and selectors John Madden and Conor Stakelum. Brian Horgan left his position as a selector.

Intersport/Elverys continued as sponsors of Tipperary GAA for a fourth year with the same kit as used in 2017.

On 10 November 2017, it was confirmed that Pádraic Maher would retain the captaincy of the Tipperary Senior hurling team for 2018.

Tipperary again chose not to compete in the Munster Senior Hurling League which was held in January.

On 2 August 2018, Michael Ryan along with his management team stepped down after three years.

On 24 September, Liam Sheedy was appointed as the new manager of the Tipperary senior hurling team on a three-year term.

== 2018 senior hurling management team ==
Name	Position	Club
Michael Ryan	Manager	Upperchurch-Drombane
Declan Fanning	Coach	Killenaule
John Madden	Selector	Lorrha-Dorrha
Conor Stakelum	Selector	Borris-Ileigh

=== 2018 squad ===
The following players made their competitive senior debut in 2018.

- Paul Maher against Clare on 28 January.
- Ger Browne against Clare on 28 January.
- Paudie Feehan against Waterford on 3 February.
- Paul Shanahan against Waterford on 3 February.
- Cian Darcy against Waterford on 3 February.
- Billy McCarthy against Wexford on 17 February.
- Mark Russell against Wexford on 17 February.
- Brian Hogan against Cork on 11 March.
- Willie Connors against Dublin on 25 March.
- Jake Morris against Cork 27 May.

No.	Player	Position	Club
1	Darragh Mooney	Goalkeeper	Éire Óg Annacarthy
2	Alan Flynn	Right corner back	Kildangan
3	James Barry	Full back	Upperchurch-Drombane
4	Michael Cahill	Left corner back	Thurles Sarsfields
5	Barry Heffernan	Right half back	Nenagh Éire Óg
6	Pádraic Maher (c)	Centre back	Thurles Sarsfields
7	Ronan Maher	Left half back	Thurles Sarsfields
8	Brendan Maher	Midfield	Borris-Ileigh
9	Séamus Kennedy	Midfield	St Mary's
10	Seán Curran	Right half forward	Mullinahone
11	Billy McCarthy	Centre forward	Thurles Sarsfields
12	John McGrath	Left half forward	Loughmore-Castleiney
13	Michael Breen	Right corner forward	Ballina
14	Jason Forde	Full forward	Silvermines
15	Willie Connors	Left corner forward	Kildangan

No.	Player	Position	Club
16	Brian Hogan	Substitute	Lorrha-Dorrha
17	Cathal Barrett	Substitute	Holycross-Ballycahill
18	Ger Browne	Substitute	Knockavilla-Donaskeigh Kickhams
19	Cian Darcy	Substitute	Kilruane MacDonagh's
20	Paudie Feehan	Substitute	Killenaule
21	Tomás Hamill	Substitute	Moyne-Templetuohy
22	Donagh Maher	Substitute	Burgess
23	Paul Maher	Substitute	Kilsheelan-Kilcash
24	Seán O'Brien	Substitute	Newport
25	John O'Dwyer	Substitute	Killenaule
26	Mark Russell	Substitute	Lattin-Cullen

Squad as per v Kilkenny in the 2018 National Hurling League Final on 8 April.

== Challenge Games ==
A 40-man pre-season training panel was named at the end of October 2017 with nine new players included while there was also a recall for defender Cathal Barrett.

In October 2017, Steven O'Brien confirmed that he would be playing with the Tipperary senior football team in 2018 after two years with the Tipperary hurling team.

Tipperary played their first challenge game of the new season on 9 December 2017 against Laois in Puckane. The match was hosted by the Kiladangan club with all proceeds going toward the Kiladangan National School defibrillator fund and Living Links Ireland.

9 December 2017

Tipperary	3–27 – 0–12	Laois
	Report Paul Maher; Alan Flynn, Tomás Hamill, Donagh Maher; Joe O'Dwyer, Barry Heffernan, Tom Fox; Jason Forde, Seán Curran; Conor Kenny, Paul Shanahan, Michael Breen; Ger Browne, Mark Russell, Niall O'Meara; Subs: Justin Cahill for Jason Forde, Seán O'Brien (Newport) for Donagh Maher, Séamus Kennedy for Conor Kenny.

Puckane
6 January
12:00

Tipperary	1-26 - 0-12	Dublin
J Forde 1-10 (0-6f), N McGrath 0-4 (0-1f), R Maher 0-3, S Curran 0-3, D McCormack 0-2, P Feehan 0-1, M Breen 0-1, S Nally 0-1, J Cahill 0-1.	Report D Mooney; P Maher, J Dwyer, D Maher; S Kennedy, B Heffernan, P Feehan; C Barrett, R Maher; P 'Bonner' Maher, N McGrath, S Curran; N O'Meara, J Forde, C Darcy.	P Winters 0-5 (0-4f), F Whitely 0-2, D Grey 0-2, A Moore 0-1, T Connolly 0-1, D Burke 0-1 (f).

Dr Morris Park Thurles
Referee: Phillip Kelly (Ballinahinch)
13 January
14:00

Tipperary	4-30 - 0-8	Liam Mellows
Michael Breen 2-0, Noel McGrath 1-0, Ger Browne 1-0	Report

Lorrha
9 February

Tipperary	Tipperary won by 5/6 points	Waterford
	Report

Dr Morris Park Thurles

== 2018 National Hurling League ==
=== Summary ===
It was confirmed in January that Séamus Callanan would miss most of the league campaign with a back injury. Tipperary started their league campaign on 28 January against Clare in Ennis, they started with only six of those who lost to Galway in the 2017 All-Ireland semi-final. The match was played in Cusack Park with a 2pm throw-in, and was televised live by TG4. Clare won the game 1-21 to 0-19, and also had a half time lead of 0-13 to 0-10. Goalkeeper Paul Maher, Tom Fox at left half back and Ger Browne at top of the right all started the game to make their league debuts. David Reidy got the clinching score for Clare in injury-time when he ran in on goal to shoot low to the net.

A week later on 3 February, Tipperary defeated Waterford. There were six changes from the team that lined out against Clare, Sean O'Brien, Joe O'Dwyer, Brendan Maher, Dan McCormack, Michael Breen and John McGrath all came into the team. Paudie Feehan came into the team a few minutes before the start due to Cathal Barrett picking up a groin injury. The match was played in Semple Stadium with a 7pm throw-in, and was televised live by Eir Sport. Before a crowd of 6,363 Waterford with the wind behind them in the first-half had an 0-10 to 0-9 lead at half-time. Mark O'Brien scored a goal for Waterford after 48 minutes shooting from a tight angle. Tipperary won a penalty when Michael Breen was fouled with Jason Forde shooting low to the left corner. Waterford only scored 1-1 in the second half. Dan McCormack who went off after four minutes of the game with a knee injury and Joe O'Dwyer who suffered a broken thumb will both miss the remainder of the league campaign.

Two weeks later on 17 February, Tipperary defeated previously unbeaten Wexford. It was the first meeting between the teams since the league semi-final in April 2017. There were five changes from the team that lined out against Waterford, Daragh Mooney, James Barry, Patrick Maher, Barry Heffernan and Michael Cahill were all named initially in the team, Michael Cahill eventually missed out due to flu. The match was played in Semple Stadium with a 7pm throw-in, and was televised live by Eir Sport before a crown of 8,358. Jason Forde who was named as the man of the match got the opening goal of the game in the 13th minute when he ran onto a pass from Sean Curran to shoot low past the goalkeeper. With Tipperary leading at half-time by 1-15 to 1-8. Forde got his second goal of the game in the 44th minute with a low powerful shot to the net and with 11 minutes remaining Tipperary were 2-20 to 1-14 ahead, before a comeback by Wexford. With Tipperary leading by three points in injury time, Patrick Maher put the game beyond Wexford when he cut in from the right to shoot low to the right of the net.

On 25 February Tipperary played Kilkenny in round four of the league. The match was played in Nowlan Park with a 2pm throw-in, and was televised live by TG4. They were without Jason Forde, John McGrath, Barry Heffernan and Paul Maher due to there involvement in the 2018 Fitzgibbon Cup final the day before. Niall O'Meara started his first league game of the year while Billy McCarthy made his first league start for Tipperary. Kilkenny won the game by a point on a 2-22 to 2-21 scoreline after leading by 0-13 to 0-12 at half-time, Michael Breen who started at full-forward scored 2-9 for Tipperary before an attendance of 10,587. Kilkenny scored two goals in less than three minutes after the restart in the second half, the first from Walter Walsh who ran in on goals to score past the goalkeeper, the second from Luke Scanlon when he cut in from the left to fire into the roof of the net. Tipperary responded when Breen kicked the ball low to the net before cutting in from the right before firing to the net to get his second goal of the game. Richie Leahy struck a late winning point for Kilkenny in injury time. Niall O'Meara picked up an arm injury in the second half.

In round five of the league, Tipperary were due to play Cork on 4 March but the game was postponed along with all the other games due to adverse weather conditions. The match against Cork took place a week later in Semple Stadium with Tipperary winning by three points on a 1-24 to 1-21 scoreline. Tipperary had a 0-15 to 1-9 lead at half time and Billy McCarthy got the Tipperary goal in the second half to put Tipperary seven clear in front of 6,733. Jason Forde ended up with a total of 0-12, 0-5 from play as Tipperary qualified for the hurling League quarter-finals where they would meet Dublin.

Tipperary were due to play Dublin in the quarter-finals on 18 March in Parnell Park, but he game was postponed due to heavy snow in Dublin. It was rescheduled for the bank holiday Monday, 19 March but again had to be called off due to the conditions in Dublin. The match was rescheduled for Croke Park on Sunday 25 March as part of a double header with the Dublin football team. The match was televised live by TG4. Ten minutes into the match, Dublin had an 0-9 to 0-1 lead before Tipperary settled and went on to outscore Dublin by nineteen points from the 13th minute of the match to run out winners by 2-25 to 0-20. John McGrath got the first goal for Tipperary in the first half after 27 minutes when he cut in from the right before shooting low to the net at the hill 16 end to put Tipperary into the lead for the first time. Ronan Maher received a second yellow card at the end of the first half after he wrapped his arm around Ryan Dwyer's neck. At half time Tipperary had a 1-15 to 0-14 lead. In the second half Michael Breen got the second goal for Tipperary in the 54th minute when he shot low to the left of the net after cutting back onto his left side. Pádraic Maher was named as the man of the match.

Tipperary played Limerick in the semi-final on 31 March at Semple Stadium. The match was televised live by TG4 with an attendance of 12,006 . Tipperary won the game on a 2-31 to 1-31 scoreline after extra-time to qualify for the final for the second year in a row. There were three changes to the team from the quarter-final with Willie Connors making his first start at corner forward and Daragh Mooney taking over as goalkeeper with Tomás Hamill also named in the half-back line. Tipperary had a 0-12 to 0-10 lead at half-time and led by 0-26 to 0-22 with three minutes remaining before Limerick came back to take the game into extra-time. During the first minute of extra time, Jason Forde who was named as the man of the match scored the first of his two goals when he intercepted a short Nicky Quaid puck-out and fired low to the net from 20m. He got his second in the 74th minute he flicked the ball into the net from the right from close range after a goalmouth scramble. Limerick pulled a goal back when Graeme Mulcahy fired powerfully into the net but Tipperary held on to win by three points.

Tipperary went on to play Kilkenny in the league final on Sunday 8 April at Nowlan Park. The match was televised live by TG4 and it was the tenth final meeting between the sides in ten years. Brendan Maher came into the side to start at midfield. Tipperary had lost league finals to Kilkeny in 2009, 2013 and All-Ireland finals to Kilkenny in 2009, 2011 and in 2014 following a draw, while Tipperary had beaten Kilkenny twice in All-Ireland finals during the same period in 2010 and 2016. Tipperary were hoping to win their 20th league title but had not won the title since 2008. Kilkenny won the game on a 2-23 to 2-17 scoreline in front of 17,608, Tipperary had a 1-10 to 0-11 lead at half time. The first Tipperary goal came from Jason Forde in the 24th minute when he shot low to the net after a pass from John McGrath. Kilkenny scored their first goal 30 seconds into the second half when Walter Walsh escaped past the Tipperary defense to fire to the net. John O'Dwyer had a goal chance saved by Eoin Murphy in the 40th minute. The second Kilkenny goal came in the 63rd minute when Conor Fogarty got free on the right and fired to the net. Tipperary only scored one point from play in the second half from John McGrath in the 38th minute, their second goal again came from Jason Forde with five minutes remaining from a 21m free which was hit low to the net. This was Kilkenny's sixth win in seven knockout league games against Tipperary and they have won 14 of their last 17 knockout matches against Tipperary and haven't lost to them at home in a knock out match since 2008. Jason Forde finished as the league's top scored for the year with a total of 7-72 in seven matches.

=== Results ===
28 January
14:00
Round 1

Clare	1–21 – 0–19	Tipperary
D Reidy 1-7 (0-5f), P Duggan 0-4 (0-2f), C Malone 0-4, J Conlon and T Kelly 0-2 each, C Galvin 0-1.	Report Paul Maher; A. Flynn, T. Hamill, D. Maher; S. Kennedy, Pádraic Maher (c), T. Fox; C. Barrett, R. Maher; C. Kenny, N. McGrath, S. Curran; Patrick Maher, J. Forde, G. Browne; Subs Joe O'Dwyer for T. Fox (35), M. Breen for C. Kenny (46), J. McGrath for G. Browne (51), B. Maher for S. Kennedy (60), D. McCormack for Patrick Maher (66)	J Forde 0-10 (frees), N McGrath 0-5 (0-1f), Paraic Maher, C Barrett, R Maher and S Curran 0-1 each.

Cusack Park, Ennis
Referee: A Kelly (Galway)
3 February
19:00
Round 2

Tipperary	1–20 – 1–11	Waterford
J Forde 1-9 (0-6 fs, 1-0 pen, 0-1 65), R Maher 0-4 (0-1 lb), N McGrath (0-1 lb), S Curran 0-2 each, J McGrath, M Breen, B Maher 0-1	Report P Maher; A Flynn, T Hamill, S O'Brien; J O'Dwyer, Paudie Maher, P Feehan; B Maher, R Maher; D McCormack, N McGrath, S Curran; M Breen, J Forde, J McGrath; Subs: P Shanahan for McCormack (inj 4 mins); J Barry for O'Dwyer (11); Patrick Maher for Shanahan (57), C Darcy for Curran (68).	P Curran (0-3 fs), M Kearney 0-3 each, M O'Brien 1-0, TJ Foran, I Kenny, A Gleeson, B O'Halloran, J Barron 0-1.

Semple Stadium, Thurles
Referee: C Lyons (Cork)
17 February
19:00
Round 3

Tipperary	3–21 – 1–21	Wexford
Jason Forde 2-9 (0-8f, 0-1 sideline), Patrick Maher 1-2, John McGrath 0-2, Donagh Maher, Barry Heffernan, Padraic Maher, Ronan Maher, Sean Curran, Noel McGrath, Michael Breen, Billy McCarthy 0-1 each.	Report D Mooney; S O'Brien, J Barry, D Maher; B Heffernan, Padraic Maher, P Feehan; B Maher, R Maher; S Curran, N McGrath, Patrick Maher; M Breen, J Forde, J McGrath; Subs: B McCarthy for Heffernan (53); G Browne for Curran (60), M Russell for Breen (65).	Lee Chin 0-10 (0-4f, 0-2 '65), Paul Morris 0-3 (0-3f), Aidan Nolan 1-0 (1-0 pen), Jack O'Connor, Kevin Foley 0-2 each, Shaun Murphy, Conor McDonald, David Dunne, Rory O'Connor 0-1 each.

Semple Stadium, Thurles
Referee: James McGrath (Westmeath)
25 February
14:00
Round 4

Kilkenny	2–22 – 1–21	Tipperary
TJ Reid (1 pen, 7 frees, 2 65s)(0-13); W. Walsh, L. Scanlon (1-0 each); R. Leahy (0-3); J. Maher, L. Blanchfield, P. Lyng, C. Browne, R. Reid, A. Murphy (0-1 each).	Report D Mooney; A Flynn, T Hamill, S O'Brien; S Kennedy, J Barry, D Maher; B Maher, R Maher; S Curran, B McCarthy, P Maher; G Browne, M Breen, N O'Meara; Subs: M Russell for Browne (half-time), C Darcy for O'Meara (44 mins).	M. Breen (6 frees)(2-9); B. Maher (0-4); N. O'Meara (0-3); C. Darcy, S. Curran, B. McCarthy, M. Russell, R. Maher (sideline)(0-1 each).

Nowlan Park, Kilkenny
Referee: A. Kelly (Galway).
11 March
14:30
Round 5

Tipperary	1–24 – 1–21	Cork
J. Forde (7 frees)(0-12); Patrick Maher (0-3); B. McCarthy (1-1); M. Breen, S. Curran, C. Barrett (0-2 each); A. Flynn, B. Maher (0-1 each).	Report B. Hogan; A. Flynn, S. O'Brien, D. Maher; B. Heffernan, Padraic Maher (c), R. Maher; B. Maher, C. Barrett; S. Curran, B. McCarthy, Patrick Maher; M. Breen, J. Forde, J. McGrath; Subs: M. Russell for McGrath (64); M. Cahill for D. Maher, C. Darcy for McCarthy (both 71).	P. Horgan (1-0 pen, 8 frees)(1-10); A. Cadogan (0-3); C. Lehane, M. Cahalane, L. Meade (0-2 each); S. Kingston, D. Kearney (0-1 each).

Semple Stadium, Thurles
Referee: P. O'Dwyer (Carlow)
25 March
13:00
Quarter-final

Dublin	0–20 – 2–25	Tipperary
D. Sutcliffe 0-6 (0-2frees); D. Burke 0-4 (0-3 frees); P. Winters 0-3; C. Keaney 0-3; F. McGibb 0-2; S. Barrett 0-1; F. O'Rionn Briain 0-1 free.	Report B Hogan; A Flynn, J Barry, M Cahill; B Heffernan, P Maher (c), P Feehan; S Kennedy, R Maher; J McGrath, B McCarthy, S Curran; M Breen, J Forde, C Darcy. Subs: J O'Dwyer for Darcy (45), Paul Maher for Kennedy (66), P Shanahan for Breen (68), T Hamill for Feehan (70), W Connors for McCarthy (72).	J. Forde 0-9 (0-7f) J. McGrath 1-4; M. Breen 1-0; R. Maher 0-2, S. Curran 0-2, J' O'Dwyer 0-2; C. Darcy 0-2; S. Kennedy, B. Heffernan, A. Flynn and P. Maher 0-1 each.

Croke Park, Dublin
Referee: S Cleere (Kilkenny)
31 March
19:00
Semi-final

Tipperary	2–31 – 1–31	Limerick
Jason Forde 2-11 (0-7f), John McGrath 0-6, Ronan Maher 0-5 (0-2 sideline), Micheal Breen 0-3, Sean Curran 0-3, Barry Heffernan 0-1, Billy McCarthy 0-1, John O'Dwyer 0-1.	Report D Mooney; A Flynn, J Barry, M Cahill; B Heffernan, P Maher (c), T Hamill; S Kennedy, R Maher; S Curran, B McCarthy, J McGrath; M Breen, J Forde, W Connors. Subs: B Maher for Hamill (half time), J O'Dwyer for McCarthy (45), C Barrett for Kennedy (65), D Maher for Heffernan (71), M Ruseell for Connor (77), C Darcy for Breen (88), S O'Brien for R Maher (90).	Aaron Gillane 0-7 (0-5f, 0-1 65), Tom Morrissey 0-5 (0-4f), Graeme Mulcahy 1-2, Kyle Hayes 0-3, Gearoid Hegarty 0-3 (0-1 sideline), Seamus Flanagan 0-3, Cian Lynch 0-2, Diarmuid Byrnes 0-1, Barry Murphy 0-1, Pat Ryan 0-1, Paul Browne 0-1, David Reidy 0-1,

Semple Stadium, Thurles
Referee: J Keenan (Wicklow)
8 April
15:30
Final

Tipperary	2–17 – 2–23	Kilkenny
Jason Forde 2-12 (1-9f, 0-1 sideline, 0-1 '65), John McGrath 0-2, Séamus Kennedy, Seán Curran, Willie Connors 0-1 each.	Report Daragh Mooney; Alan Flynn, James Barry, Michael Cahill; Barry Heffernan, Padraic Maher (c), Ronan Maher; Brendan Maher, Seamus Kennedy; Sean Curran, Billy McCarthy, John McGrath; Michael Breen, Jason Forde, Willie Connors; Subs: John O'Dwyer for Breen (HT), Cathal Barrett for Kennedy (45), Mark Russell for Curran (59), Donagh Maher for Barry (61), Cian Darcy for McCarthy (65).	TJ Reid 0-15 (0-11f, 0-1 sideline), Walter Walsh 1-2, Conor Fogarty 1-0, John Donnelly 0-2, Eoin Murphy (0-1f), Richie Leahy, Martin Keoghan 0-1 each.

Nowlan Park, Kilkenny
Referee: Alan Kelly (Galway)

== 2018 Munster Senior Hurling Championship ==
The draw for the Munster championship round-robin fixtures was held off camera on 19 October 2017 and announced on the championship draw broadcast live on RTÉ2 that evening. After the completion of the league, five players were released from the Tipperary senior hurling panel, Paul Shanahan, Tom Fox, Lyndon Fairbrother, Paddy Caddell and Tomas Hamill. Seamus Callanan returned to training on 17 April.

=== Round 1 (v Limerick 20 May) ===
Manager Micheal Ryan named four championship debutants for the opening Munster Championship round-robin game against Limerick at the Gaelic Grounds on 20 May with goalkeeper Brian Hogan, Barry Heffernan, Willie Connors and Billy McCarthy all starting, with Alan Flynn making his first start. The match was televised live on RTÉ2 as part of the Sunday Game presented by Michael Lyster with analysis by Ger Loughnane, Henry Shefflin, and Tomás Mulcahy. Commentary on the game was provided by Marty Morrissey alongside Dónal O'Grady. Limerick won the game on a 1-23 to 2-14 scoreline in front of an attendance of 20,423. Tipperary had a 1-10 to 0-12 lead at half time, the Tipperary goal coming from Dan McCormack in the 20th minute when he reacted quickly to fire low to the net after John McGrath's one handed effort rebounded off the base of the post. Jason Forde got the second goal for Tipperary against the run of play in the 50th minute to level the game when he caught the ball on the right before firing into the left side of the net. Limerick went on to outscore Tipperary by 1-5 to 0-2 to win the game by 6 points with Barry Murphy getting the Limerick goal in the 67th minute when he batted down past Brian Hogan and into the net. After the match, Michael Ryan issued a media ban until after the completion of the Munster Championship but reversed this decision two days later when he spoke to Tipp FM radio. "We're very disappointed with the performance levels we brought on Sunday, they weren't good enough, Fellas get opportunities based on their performances in our training games, the reason why I didn't speak to the media on Sunday immediately after the match was a decision we had taken prior to the campaign," Ryan said speaking to Tipp FM. This defeat to Limerick was the fourth consecutive defeat they have suffered in the immediate aftermath of a National Hurling league final loss, following losses to Limerick in 2013 and 2014 and Cork in 2017, games that were next up after the league finals against Kilkenny in 2013 and 2014 and Galway in 2017.

=== Round 2 (v Cork 27 May) ===
A week later Tipperary played Cork at Semple Stadium in round 2 of the Munster Championship group stage on 27 May. The match was televised live on RTÉ2 as part of the Sunday Game presented by Michael Lyster with analysis by Ger Loughnane, Henry Shefflin, and Cyril Farrell. Commentary on the game was provided by Darragh Maloney alongside Michael Duignan. There were six changes to the team from the previous week with Seamus Callanan, Patrick Maher, Brendan Maher and Sean O'Brien all starting and Michael Cahill and Joe O'Dwyer also coming into the team. The game finished in a draw on a 2-20 to 1-23 scoreline after Cork had a nine-point lead at half-time on a 1-15 to 1-6 scoreline. In front of an attendance of 22,456, Jason Fode got the first goal for Tipperary after 14 minutes with a low powerful finish to the right. Noel McGrath got the other goal when he cut in from the left to score with a low shot to the right. With three minutes to go, Cork led by three points when goalkeeper Anthony Nash saved low to his right from a ground shot by John O'Dwyer. Jake Morris got the equalizing point for Tipperary with the last puck of the game in the 72nd minute. John McGrath was named as the man of the match. Tipperary manager Michael Ryan was not happy with the first half saying "It was a horrible first half for us. Cork were all over us and we were literally chasing shadows all over the pitch, We didn't get to express ourselves or take control of any part of that first half. It was Cork, Cork, Cork."

=== Round 3 (v Waterford 3 June) ===
The following week Tipperary played Waterford at the Gaelic Grounds in round 3 of the Munster Championship group stage on 3 June. The match was televised live on RTÉ2 as part of the Sunday Game presented by Joanne Cantwell with analysis by Liam Sheedy, Ken McGrath, and Cyril Farrell. Commentary on the game was provided by Darragh Maloney alongside Anthony Daly. Tipperary made one change to the team with John O'Dwyer starting instead of Patrick Maher. For the second week in a row the game finished in a draw on a 2-22 to 2-22 scoreline after Waterford had a six-point lead at half time on a 2-12 to 0-12 scoreline and had an eleven-point lead in the 54th minute. In front of an attendance of 10,237 and in very warm conditions, Michael Cahill was sent off after being shown a second yellow card just before half-time. Patrick Maher got the first goal for Tipperary in the second half with a low powerful finish to the net from the right after 58 minutes. Jason Forde got the other goal in the 62nd minute when he hit a long range free which dropped short and was juggled by Waterford player Austin Gleeson on the line before being cleared, the umpire gave a goal as he [sic?] taught that the ball had gone over the line before being cleared. Brendan Maher was named as the man of the match.

=== Round 4 (v Clare 10 June) ===
Tipperary went on to play Clare in their last game of the group stage on 10 June in Semple Stadium. They lost the game on a 1-23 to 1-21 scoreline. This was the first championship fixture between the sides in Semple Stadium in 33 years and Clare's first win since 1928. Clare's win was also their first win in Tipperary in the championship since 1928. The match was televised live on RTÉ2 as part of the Sunday Game presented by Michael Lyster with analysis by Ger Loughnane, Jackie Tyrrell, and Liam Sheedy. Commentary on the game was provided by Marty Morrissey alongside Dónal O'Grady. Clare won the game by two points to eliminate Tipperary from the championship. There were three changes to the Tipperary team that drew with Waterford the previous week with Donagh Maher, Cathal Barrett and Patrick Maher coming in to replace John O'Dwyer, Noel McGrath and the suspended Michael Cahill. The Tipperary goal came from Billy McCarthy in the 13th minute when he burst past David McInerney to fire powerfully past the Clare goalkeeper, this gave Tipperray a six-point lead, 1-4 to 0-1 and they increased the lead to eight in the first half before four Clare points made the half time score 1-10 to 0-9. Tipperary continued to lead the match until injury time when Clare leveled the match and then went on to lead with two points from man of the match Peter Duggan. The Clare goal came from Ian Galvin when he received the ball from Podge Collins before side-stepping and finishing low to the left of the net. That Clare goal came 18 seconds after Jake Morris had hit the post from the left which would have put Tipperary into a seven-point lead with 6 minutes left. Late in the match, Brendan Maher tore his cruciate and is expected to be out of action till 2019. Tipperary manager Michael Ryan speaking after the game was disappointed but happy that the team had finally performed saying "I didn't see fatigue — if anything I saw the opposite, that was our best performance out of four yet we didn't get anything out of it. I know the writing was on the wall for us, we had to deliver a performance today to have a chance. I don't think it hurt us today." On 13 June the Tipperary County board released a statement firmly backing Michael Ryan and his management team after criticism of the team's performance in the championship. This is the earliest that Tipperary have been eliminated from the championship since the defeat to Waterford on 7 June 1998 in the Munster semi-final at Pairc Ui Chaoimh, a team that included manager Michael Ryan.

On 2 August 2018, Michael Ryan along with his management team stepped down after three years.

=== Results ===
20 May
14:00
Round 1

Limerick	1–23 – 2–14	Tipperary
A Gillane 0-8 (6f); G Mulcahy 0-4; B Murphy 1-0; D Byrnes 0-3 (2f, 1'65'); C Lynch, G Hegarty, T Morrissey 0-2 each; S Flanagan, D O'Donovan 0-1 each	Report Brian Hogan; Alan Flynn, Seamus Kennedy, Donagh Maher; Barry Heffernan, Padraic Maher (c), Ronan Maher; Willie Connors, Billy McCarthy; Dan McCormack, Noel McGrath, Sean Curran; John O'Dwyer, Jason Forde, John McGrath; Subs: Sean O'Brien for Donagh Maher (43), Brendan Maher for Willie Connors (49), Seamus Callanan for Sean Curran (52), Patrick Maher for Billy McCarthy (64)	J Forde 1-9 (8f); D McCormack 1-0; J McGrath, N McGrath 0-2 each; J O'Dwyer 0-1

Gaelic Grounds, Limerick
Referee: James McGrath (Westmeath)
27 May
14:00
Round 2

Cork	1–23 – 2-20	Tipperary
Shane Kingston 1-5, Seamus Harnedy, Patrick Horgan (0-3f) 0-5 each, Daniel Kearney 0-4, Conor Lehane, Bill Cooper 0-2 each.	Report B. Hogan; S. O'Brien, S. Kennedy, M. Cahill; Joe. O'Dwyer, R. Maher, Padraic Maher (c); B. Maher, B. McCarthy; D. McCormack, N. McGrath, Patrick Maher, S. Callanan, J. Forde, J. McGrath; Subs: P. Feehan for Padraic Maher (blood 12-14); J. O'Dwyer for Patrick Maher (HT); J. Morris for Callanan and G. Browne for McCarthy (71).	Jason Forde 1-6 (0-4f, 0-2 '65), Noel McGrath 1-3, John McGrath 0-5, Brendan Maher, Billy McCarthy, Patrick Maher, Seamus Callanan, John O'Dwyer, Jake Morris 0-1 each

Semple Stadium, Thurles
Referee: John Keenan (Wicklow)
3 June
16:00
Round 3

Waterford	2–22 – 2-22	Tipperary
Pauric Mahony 1-8 (0-5f), Tom Devine 1-2, DJ Foran, Jamie Barron 0-3 each, Patrick Curran 0-2, Philip Mahony, Stephen Bennett, Tommy Ryan, Jake Dillon 0-1 each.	Report B. Hogan; S. O'Brien, S. Kennedy, M. Cahill; Joe O'Dwyer, Pádraic Maher (c), B. Maher; R. Maher, B. McCarthy; D. McCormack, J. Forde, John O'Dwyer; N. McGrath, S. Callanan, J. McGrath; Subs: Patrick Maher for J. O'Dwyer (47); C. Barrett for N. McGrath (55); J. Morris for J. McGrath (59); S. Curran for D. McCormack (60); W. Connors for B. McCarthy (68).	Jason Forde 1-14 (1-12f), Ronan Maher 0-3, Patrick Maher 1-0, Seamus Callanan 0-2, Noel McGrath, Billy McCarthy, Cathal Barrett 0-1 each.

Gaelic Grounds, Limerick
Referee: Alan Kelly (Galway)
10 June
14:00
Round 4

Clare	1–23 – 1-21	Tipperary
P Duggan 0-15 (13f). P Collins 0-3, I Galvin 1-0, T Kelly, J Conlon 0-2 each, J Browne 0-1.	Report B Hogan; S O'Brien, S Kennedy, D Maher; Joe O'Dwyer, Padraic Maher (c), B Maher; R Maher, C Barrett; D McCormack, Patrick Maher, B McCarthy; J McGrath, J Forde, S Callanan; Subs: N McGrath for McCormack (10), J Morris for Patrick Maher (60), A Flynn for O'Dwyer (60), W Connors for B Maher (68), J O'Dwyer for J McGrath (73).	J Forde 0-10 (8f, 1'65'), B McCarthy 1-0, J McGrath 0-3, S Callanan, N McGrath 0-2 each, R Maher, Padraic Maher, Patrick Maher, C Barrett 0-1 each.

Semple Stadium, Thurles
Referee: Alan Kelly (Galway)

== Awards ==
The PwC All-Star Awards

The nominations for the PwC All-Stars were announced on 13 September with Tipperary receiving one nomination in forward Jason Forde.The award winners were announced on 2 November with Forde not being named in the team.
