= 2017 Tipperary county hurling team season =

Tipperary county hurling team
2017 season
| Manager | Michael Ryan |
| Captain | Pádraic Maher |
| All-Ireland SHC | Semi-finalists |
| Munster SHC | Quarter-finalists |
| National League | Runners-up |
| Top scorer Championship | Séamus Callanan 3-34 |
| Highest SHC attendance | 68,184 (v Galway 6 August) |
| Lowest SHC attendance | 6,893 (v Westmeath 1 July) |
Colours

The 2017 season was Michael Ryan's second year as manager of the Tipperary senior hurling team.

On 28 November 2016, Pádraic Maher was named as the new captain of the Tipperary Senior hurling team for 2017 with Séamus Callanan named as vice-captain.

Intersport/Elverys continued as sponsors of Tipperary GAA for a third year. Tipperary wore a New Jersey design for the first time on 23 April in the League final against Galway. The new design has Intersport with Elverys underneath with Elverys.ie on the back shoulders.

The Tipperary players and management team traveled to Miami in December 2016 for a team holiday where they rang in the new year. Tipperary again chose not to compete in the Munster Senior Hurling League which was held in January.

Tipperary were going for a three in a row of Munster titles and were also defending their All-Ireland title. They were looking to win back-to-back All-Ireland's for the first time since 1965.

== 2017 senior hurling management team ==
| Name | Position | Club |
| Michael Ryan | Manager | Upperchurch-Drombane |
| Declan Fanning | Coach | Killenaule |
| John Madden | Selector | Lorrha-Dorrha |
| Brian Horgan | Selector | Knockavilla-Donaskeigh Kickhams |
| Conor Stakelum | Selector | Borris-Ileigh |

=== 2017 squad ===
On 28 November 2016, a pre-season training squad of 40 players was announced by Michael Ryan for winter training.

The following players made their competitive senior debut in 2017.

- Paul Flynn against Clare on 5 March.
- Tommy Heffernan against Cork on 26 March.
- Alan Flynn against Offaly on 2 April.
- Tom Fox against Westmeath on 1 July.
- Sean O'Brien against Clare on 22 July.

| No. | Player | Position | Club |
|---|---|---|---|
| 1 | Darren Gleeson | Goalkeeper | Portroe |
| 2 | Cathal Barrett | Right corner back | Holycross-Ballycahill |
| 3 | James Barry | Full back | Upperchurch-Drombane |
| 4 | Michael Cahill | Left corner back | Thurles Sarsfields |
| 5 | Séamus Kennedy | Right half back | St Mary's |
| 6 | Ronan Maher | Centre back | Thurles Sarsfields |
| 7 | Pádraic Maher (c) | Left half back | Thurles Sarsfields |
| 8 | Brendan Maher | Midfield | Borris-Ileigh |
| 9 | Jason Forde | Midfield | Silvermines |
| 10 | Dan McCormack | Right half Forward | Borris-Ileigh |
| 11 | Michael Breen | Centre forward | Ballina |
| 12 | Steven O'Brien | Left half Forward | Ballina |
| 13 | Noel McGrath | Right corner forward | Loughmore-Castleiney |
| 14 | John O'Dwyer | Full forward | Killenaule |
| 15 | John McGrath | Left corner forward | Loughmore-Castleiney |

| No. | Player | Position | Club |
|---|---|---|---|
| 16 | Darragh Mooney | Substitute | Éire Óg Annacarthy |
| 17 | Kieran Bergin | Substitute | Killenaule |
| 18 | Alan Flynn | Substitute | Kildangan |
| 19 | Paul Flynn | Substitute | Kildangan |
| 20 | Tomás Hamill | Substitute | Moyne-Templetuohy |
| 21 | Barry Heffernan | Substitute | Nenagh Éire Óg |
| 22 | Patrick Maher | Substitute | Lorrha-Dorrha |
| 23 | Aidan McCormack | Substitute | Thurles Sarsfields |
| 24 | John O'Keeffe | Substitute | Clonoulty-Rossmore |
| 25 | Niall O'Meara | Substitute | Kilruane MacDonagh's |
| 26 | Daire Quinn | Substitute | Nenagh Éire Óg |

Squad as per 2017 National Hurling League Final v Galway on 23 April 2017

| No. | Player | Position | Club |
|---|---|---|---|
| 1 | Darren Gleeson | Goalkeeper | Portroe |
| 2 | Donagh Maher | Right corner back | Burgess |
| 3 | James Barry | Full back | Upperchurch-Drombane |
| 4 | Michael Cahill | Left corner back | Thurles Sarsfields |
| 5 | Séamus Kennedy | Right half back | St Mary's |
| 6 | Ronan Maher | Centre back | Thurles Sarsfields |
| 7 | Pádraic Maher (c) | Left half back | Thurles Sarsfields |
| 8 | Brendan Maher | Midfield | Borris-Ileigh |
| 9 | Michael Breen | Midfield | Ballina |
| 10 | Dan McCormack | Right half Forward | Borris-Ileigh |
| 11 | Patrick Maher | Centre forward | Lorrha-Dorrha |
| 12 | Noel McGrath | Left half Forward | Loughmore-Castleiney |
| 13 | John O'Dwyer | Right corner forward | Killenaule |
| 14 | Séamus Callanan | Full forward | Drom-Inch |
| 15 | John McGrath | Left corner forward | Loughmore-Castleiney |

| No. | Player | Position | Club |
|---|---|---|---|
| 16 | Darragh Mooney | Substitute | Éire Óg Annacarthy |
| 17 | Seán Curran | Substitute | Mullinahone |
| 18 | Jason Forde | Substitute | Silvermines |
| 19 | Tom Fox | Substitute | Éire Óg Annacarty |
| 20 | Tomás Hamill | Substitute | Moyne-Templetuohy |
| 21 | Barry Heffernan | Substitute | Nenagh Éire Óg |
| 22 | Billy McCarthy | Substitute | Thurles Sarsfields |
| 23 | Seán O'Brien | Substitute | Newport |
| 24 | Steven O'Brien | Substitute | Ballina |
| 25 | John O'Keeffe | Substitute | Clonoulty-Rossmore |
| 26 | Niall O'Meara | Substitute | Kilruane MacDonagh's |

Squad as per 2017 All-Ireland Senior Hurling Championship Semi-Final v Galway on 6 August 2017

== Challenge Games ==
A challenge match against St. Thomas of Galway which was due to be played on 22 January was called off as St. Thomas's withdrew. Tipperary played their first game of the year against Antrim in a challenge match on 29 January in Corrigan Park, Belfast. The match against Antrim was as part of a weekend to remember the late Fr. Alec Reid, Redemptorist Priest, originally from Nenagh and who played a pivotal role in the Peace Process. He was also a member of the Tipperary minor hurling panel which won the All-Ireland title in 1949. Antrim had a 2–8 to 0–8 lead at half-time but Tipperary went on to win by 4–22 to 2–15.

29 January

| Tipperary | 4–22 – 2–15 | Antrim |
|---|---|---|
| Michael Breen (0-2), Sean Ryan (0-4), Jason Forde (0-1), Seamus Callanan (2-5, 5 frees), John McGrath (1-2), Kieran Bergin (0-1), Stephen Quirke (0-2), Paudie Greene (1-2), Tom Fox (0-1), Tommy Heffernan (0-1) | Report Brian Hogan; Joe O’Dwyer, Ronan Maher, Alan Flynn; Willie Ryan, Séamus Kennedy, Barry Heffernan, Stephen Cahill Michael Breen; Sean Ryan, Steven O’Brien, Jason Forde; Andrew Coffey, Seamus Callanan (c), John McGrath Subs: Darragh Mooney for Hogan H-T, Kieran Bergin for Cahill H-T, Michael Cahill for Heffernan H-T, Stephen Quirke for Forde 53mins, Brendan Maher for Breen H-T, Paudie Greene for Coffey H-T, Tom Fox for W. Ryan 31mins, John Meagher for O’Dwyer 43mins, Tommy Heffernan for McGrath 46mins, Daire Quinn for Kennedy 47mins |

Corrigan Park, Belfast

== 2017 National Hurling League ==
=== Summary ===
Tipperary started their league campaign on 11 February against Dublin, 22 weeks after winning the All-Ireland title. The match was played in Croke Park with a 5pm throw-in, and was televised live by Eir Sport. Steven O'Brien and Aidan McCormack made their league debuts for Tipperary in the match with Pádraic Maher being named as the man of the match. Tipperary had a 0–11 to 0–6 lead at half-time and went on to win by 16 points on a 1–24 to 1-8 scoreline where there was strong wind with heavy rain during the game. The Tipperary goal was scored by Jason Forde in the 55th minute when he read the break of the ball and ran through unopposed before hitting a low shot past Dublin goalkeeper Gary Maguire.

A week later on 19 February Tipperary defeated Waterford in wet conditions on a heavy pitch at Walsh Park by 1–18 to 0–15. Tipperary had a 0–11 to 0–10 lead at half time. The Tipperary goal was scored by John McGrath in the 58th minute when he batted the ball to the net after an initial shot from Noel McGrath was saved by Waterford goalkeeper Ian O'Regan. The match was shown live by TG4. Séamus Kennedy was the man of the match. After two games Tipperary were on top of Division 1A of the National Hurling League with four points and the only team to win both of their opening games.

On 5 March Tipperary played Clare in round 3 of the National Hurling League at Semple Stadium, deferred coverage of the game was shown by TG4. The Tipperary v Longford National Football League match that was due to take place before it was postponed due to the weather. James Barry was named to start but was ruled out of the match due to a heavy cold which prevented him from training all week, with Padraic Maher starting instead. Séamus Callanan was also ruled out with a bug. Barry Heffernan made his first start of the year at midfield. Tipperary had a 0–5 to no score lead after 12 minutes and also lead by 0–7 to 0-2 before Clare playing with the breeze got into the game and had a 0–11 to 0–10 lead at half time. In the second half Tipperary pulled clear before Clare reduced the lead back to three points with Tipperary once again going on to win by seven points. Brendan Maher went off with a shoulder injury just before half-time with Niall O'Meara and Donagh Maher also leaving the game with injuries, the latter went off deep in stoppage time with concussion with Tipperary finishing the match with 14 men. Tomás Hamill who was switched to full-back was named as the man of the match. With this victory Tipperary maintained their 100% record in the league and are also now unbeaten in 11 months.

On 11 March Tipperary played Kilkenny under the lights in round 4 of the National Hurling League at Semple Stadium. The match was televised live by Eir Sport. This was the 31st league and championship clash between the counties since Brian Cody took over as manager of Kilkenny in 1999. There were 41 players training with the Tipperary hurling panel for the league and the starting side included ten of the starting fifteen which started the 2016 All Ireland Final against Kilkenny. Tipperary went on to maintain their unbeaten record when substitute Steven O’Brien scored a 70th minute point to earn a draw. On a warm dry night Tipperary led by four points at half-time on a 2–11 to 2-7 scoreline. John McGrath got the opening goal for Tipperary in the third minute with a low shot along the ground from close range after confusion in the Kilkenny full-back after a high ball into the square. Kilkenny replied with a goal from TJ Reid when he shot powerfully to the net which left Darragh Mooney rooted to the spot after five minutes. Niall O’Meara got the second goal for Tipperary when he fired low to the right of the net across the goalkeeper after a short run at goal and an initial pass from John O’Dwyer, this put Tipperary in a 2–7 to 1–2 lead. O’Meara's goal was later voted at the end of 2017 as the GAA hurling goal of the year. TJ Reid scored from a penalty after thirty minutes, after a Michael Cahill foul on Alan Murphy. In the second half Padraic Maher brought down Liam Blanchfield in the 56th minute with TJ Reid scoring his third goal of the game and his second penalty. It was revealed that Brendan Maher may miss the remainder of the league after he damaged his AC joint in round 3 against Clare. It was also revealed that Cathal Barrett is close to returning to action after an operation on an ankle injury before Christmas.

On 26 March Tipperary, already assured of finishing on top, played Cork in round 5 of the National Hurling League at Páirc Uí Rinn. Highlights of the match were shown that night on League Sunday. Tipperary and Cork had previously met on 60 occasions in the National Hurling League with Cork leading with 29 wins to Tipperary's 26, while there have been 5 draws. John Meagher and Willie Ryan made their first starts in the league while Tommy Heffernan made his league debut, goalkeeper Darren Gleeson started his first league game of the year. In a match played in warm sunny conditions, Cork had a 0–14 to 2–6 lead at half-time. The first half Tipperary goals came from Seamus Callanan with a close range finish after a rebound came back to him from a John McGrath shot and a minute later from John McGrath this time the finisher after a pass from Seamus Callanan. In the second half with time almost up Séamus Callanan got his second goal of the game when he kicked to the net to level the match. Patrick Horgan then put Cork back in front with a point before Ronan Maher equalized with a sideline cut. There was still time for Patrick Horgan to put Cork in front again with a long range point in the 74th minute which turned out to be the winning score. It was the first defeat of the season for Tipperary.

On 2 April, Tipperary went on to play Offaly in the Quarter-final at O'Connor Park in Tullamore after the draw for home advantage was made on 27 March. Tipperary won the game easily by 18 points on a 4–28 to 3-13 scoreline. Cathal Barrett returned after having a scheduled operation on an ankle for his first game of the year, while defender Alan Flynn made his League debut starting at corner back. Playing against the breeze in the opening half, they had a 1–14 to 0–7 lead at half-time with the first goal coming from Seamus Callanan in the 17th minute after an assist by Niall O’Meara. Tipperary led by 25 points at one stage in the second half before a late rally by Offaly brought the score down.

Tipperary went on to play Wexford at Nowlan Park in the semi-finals on Easter Sunday 16 April, with the winners playing Galway who beat Limerick earlier in the final. The match was shown live by TG4. Brendan Maher was expected to return from a shoulder injury he sustained against Clare in March. Patrick Maher returned to the panel after returning from a six-month Army peacekeeping trip to Syria. Tipperary had a two-day get-together at the Abbottstown's Centre of Excellence over the weekend of 8 and 9 April. Six players were cut from the squad, Andrew Coffey, Tommy Heffernan, Padraig Greene, Stephen Cahill, Dylan Fitzell and Willie Ryan. Brendan Maher returned to the team for the semi-final alongside Jason Forde who replaced Michael Breen in midfield. John O’Dwyer didn't start the game and was replaced in attack by Steven O’Brien. Donagh Maher picked up a hamstring injury in training the week before the game and will be out for a number of weeks. In dry and warm conditions, Tipperary won the game on a 5–18 to 1-19 scoreline. With ten minutes to go in the game, Tipperary were two points in front but they then went on a run of scoring 2-4 without reply in a five-minute spell to go on and win the game with ease in the end. Tipperary had a 2–6 to 0–8 lead at half time with the first half goals coming from John McGrath in the 6th minute and the second from Noel McGrath in the 18th minute after a pass from Niall O’Meara. Wexford manager Davy Fitzgerald then entered the field to challenge referee Diarmuid Kirwan thinking that it should have been a free to Wexford before the second goal. He confronted Tipperary's Niall O’Meara and shoved Jason Forde before leaving the field of play. John McGrath was named as the man of the match.

The league final against Galway was played at the Gaelic Grounds on 23 April with a 3:30 throw in. The match was shown live by TG4. Tipperary were aiming for their first league title win since 2008. It was confirmed the day after the semi-final victory that Séamus Callanan had broken his thumb during that game and would miss the final. On 20 April, Jason Forde was handed a proposed two-game suspension for his reaction to Davy Fitzgerald coming on the field of play in the semi-final win. Tipperary have already indicated that they will appeal the decision. Forde was named in the starting line-up alongside the returning Michael Breen and John O'Dwyer instead of Niall O'Meara and the injured Seamus Callanan. In the final, Galway won by 3–21 to 0–14. Galway were dominate throughout the match and had a 0–11 to 0–5 lead at half-time with several other scoring opportunities missed. In the first minutes of the second half Jason Flynn scored the first goal of the game when he cut in from the left before firing to the roof of the net. He got his second in the 57th minute when he again managed to cut in from the left before firing past the advancing Darren Gleeson. Patrick Maher came on in the second half to make his first appearance of the year and hit one shot against the bar, but Galway had complete control of the match and got a third goal late on from Cathal Mannion when he fired low to the left. Tipperary manager Michael Ryan speaking after the match said "I can’t explain where it all went wrong, that was a complete non-show from us." The loss was Tipperary's biggest ever defeat in an All-Ireland or National League final and the defeat means that Kilkenny remain the only county to win the League title as reigning All-Ireland champions since Galway in 1989. Two days after the defeat to Galway, Kieran Bergin informed manager Michael Ryan that he was departing the panel due to work commitments, he subsequently joined the Tipperary Senior football panel a week later.

=== Results ===
11 February
17:00
Round 1

| Dublin | 1–8 – 1–24 | Tipperary |
|---|---|---|
| E Dillon 1-0, D Burke 0-3 (0-3f), N McMorrow 0-2, O O’Rorke, F McGibb 0-1 each. | Report Daragh Mooney; Donagh Maher, James Barry, John O’Keeffe; Tomas Hamill, Ronan Maher, Padraic Maher (c); Brendan Maher, Kieran Bergin; Steven O’Brien, Jason Forde, Noel McGrath; John O’Dwyer, Seamus Callanan, Aidan McCormack Subs: Séamus Kennedy for R Maher (27-35), Michael Cahill for O’Keeffe (49), Sean Curran for O’Brien (52), Niall O’Meara for Callanan (55), Barry Heffernan for R Maher (56), Daire Quinn for P Maher (59). | S Callanan 0-8 (0-8f), J Forde 1-3, A McCormack 0-5, P Maher 0-2, T Hamill, K Bergin, N McGrath, S Curran, N O’Meara 0-1 each. |

Croke Park, Dublin
Attendance: 28,305
Referee: P O'Dwyer (Carlow)
19 February
14:00
Round 2

| Waterford | 0–15 – 1–18 | Tipperary |
|---|---|---|
| P Mahony 0-9 (8f), B O'Halloran 0-2, T Devine, M Kearney, G O'Brien, A Gleeson 0-1 each. | Report D Mooney; D Maher, J Barry, J O'Dwyer; S Kennedy, T Hamill, P Maher (c); B Maher, K Bergin; D McCormack, J Forde, S O'Brien; A McCormack, J McGrath, N O'Meara. Subs: J O’Dwyer for A McCormack (28), N McGrath for Forde (50), M Breen for Bergin (55), S Callanan for O’Brien (59), M Cahill for J O'Dwyer (64). | J McGrath 1-6 (3f), John O’Dwyer 0-5 (4f), J Forde, S O’Brien 0-2 each, N O'Meara, B Maher, K Bergin 0-1 each. |

Walsh Park, Waterford
Attendance: 7,344
Referee: D Kirwan (Cork)
5 March
15:00
Round 3

| Tipperary | 0–28 – 0–21 | Clare |
|---|---|---|
| J. McGrath (0-10, 5 frees); J. O’Dwyer (0-5); N. McGrath, S. O’Brien (0-3 each); P. Flynn (0-2); B. Maher, N. O'Meara, R. Maher (free), D. McCormack, S. Curran (0-1 each). | Report D Mooney; D. Maher, J. O’Dwyer, T. Hamill; S. Kennedy, R. Maher, P. Maher (c); B. Maher, B. Heffernan; S. O’Brien, N. O’Meara, N. McGrath; J. O'Dwyer, J. McGrath, A. McCormack Subs: W. Ryan for S. Kennedy (31), M. Breen for B. Maher (inj, 34), D. McCormack for N. O'Meara (inj 40), P. Flynn for A. McCormack (56), S. Curran for B. Heffernan (67). | D. Reidy (0-6, frees); J. Conlon, P. Collins (0-4 each); I. Galvin (0-3); A. Cunningham, C. McInerney, S. Morey, J. McCarthy (0-1 each). |

Semple Stadium, Thurles
Attendance: 7,254
Referee: B. Kelly (Westmeath)
11 March
19:00
Round 4

| Tipperary | 2–17 – 3–14 | Kilkenny |
|---|---|---|
| Seamus Callanan 0-6 (3fs, 1 65), John McGrath 1-2, Niall O’Meara 1-1, Sean Curran and Dan McCormack 0-2 each, Padraic Maher, Noel McGrath, John O’Dwyer and Steven O’Brien 0-1 each. | Report D Mooney; John O’Keeffe, James Barry, Michael Cahill; Tomás Hamill, Ronan Maher, Pádraic Maher (c); Sean Curran, Michael Breen; Dan McCormack, Niall O’Meara, Noel McGrath; John O’Dwyer, Seamus Callanan, John McGrath. Subs: Kieran Bergin for Breen (35), Jason Forde for McCormack (55), Séamus Kennedy for Cahill (58), Steven O’Brien for O’Meara (68). | TJ Reid 3-5 (2-0 pens, 4fs), Richie Hogan 0-4, Cillian Buckley 0-3, Walter Walsh 0-2. |

Semple Stadium, Thurles
Attendance: 14,763
Referee: James Owens (Wexford)
26 March
15:00
Round 5

| Cork | 0–26 – 3–16 | Tipperary |
|---|---|---|
| P Horgan (0-15, 10 frees, 1 65); D. Fitzgibbon (0-5); S. Harnedy, A. Cadogan (0-2 each); C. Lehane (free), L. Meade (0-1 each) | Report Darren Gleeson; Michael Cahill, James Barry, John Meagher; Willie Ryan, Tomás Hamill, Pádraic Maher; Seán Curran, Kieran Bergin; Dan McCormack, Niall O’Meara, Jason Forde; Séamus Callanan, John McGrath, Tommy Heffernan. Subs: Noel McGrath for Curran (45), Paul Flynn for Heffernan (45), Barry Heffernan for Bergin (54), John O’Dwyer for O’Meara (62), Ronan Maher for Ryan (70). | S. Callanan (2-6, 0-4 frees, 0-1 65); J. McGrath (1-1); P. Maher, D. McCormack, N. McGrath (0-2 each), P. Flynn, J. Forde, R. Maher (sideline) (0-1) |

Páirc Uí Rinn, Cork
Attendance: 8,376
Referee: B. Gavin (Offaly)
2 April
16:00
Quarter-Final

| Offaly | 3–13 – 4–28 | Tipperary |
|---|---|---|
| Shane Dooley 2-8 (0-6f), Oisín Kelly 1-0, Paddy Murphy 0-2, Aidan Treacy, Seán Ryan & Cillian Kiely 0-1 each. | Report D Gleeson; T Hamill, J Barry, A Flynn; S Kennedy, R Maher, P Maher; M Breen, J Forde; D McCormack, N O’Meara, N McGrath; J McGrath, S Callanan, J O’Dwyer; Subs: S O’Brien for N McGrath (h.t.), P Flynn for J McGrath (43), C Barrett for Hamill (46), D Quinn for P Maher (52), S Cahill for O’Meara (64). | Seamus Callanan 2-11 (0-7f, 0-1 65), Niall O’Meara 0-5, Paul Flynn & Steven O’Brien 1-1 each, Dan McCormack 0-4, Michael Breen 0-3, Noel McGrath, John O’Dwyer & Stephen Cahill 0-1 each. |

O'Connor Park, Tullamore
Attendance: 8,032
Referee: Colm Lyons (Cork)
16 April
16:00
Semi-Final

| Tipperary | 5–18 – 1–19 | Wexford |
|---|---|---|
| J. McGrath, N. McGrath (2-2 each); B. Maher (1-2); M. Breen (0-4); S. Callanan (0-3, 1 65); J. Forde (0-2); P. Maher, J. O’Dwyer, D. Quinn (0-1 each). | Report D Gleeson; M. Cahill, J. Barry, R. Maher; S. Kennedy, P. Maher, C. Barrett; B. Maher, J. Forde; D. McCormack, N. O’Meara, S. O’Brien; N. McGrath, S. Callanan, J. McGrath. Subs: M. Breen for N. O’Meara (h-t); J. O’Dwyer for S. O’Brien (48); D. Quinn for J. Forde (65); T. Hamill for J. Barry, B. Heffernan for S. Kennedy (both 68). | C. McDonald (0-7, 6 frees); L. Chin (0-4, 1 65); D. Redmond (0-3); L. Ryan (1-0); J. O’Connor, D. O’Keeffe, P. Morris, D. Dunne, K. Foley (0-1 each). |

Nowlan Park, Kilkenny
Attendance: 19,095
Referee: D. Kirwan (Cork).
23 April
15:30
Final

| Galway | 3–21 – 0–14 | Tipperary |
|---|---|---|
| J Canning (0-9, 0-4 frees, 2 65s); J Flynn (2-1); C Whelan (0-5); C Mannion (1-1); A Harte (0-2); J Coen, David Burke, T Monaghan (0-1 each). | Report D Gleeson; C Barrett, J Barry, M Cahill; S Kennedy, R Maher, Pádraic Maher (c); B Maher, J Forde; D McCormack, M Breen, S O’Brien; N McGrath, J O’Dwyer, J McGrath; N O’Meara for S O’Brien (32), Patrick Maher for J O’Dwyer (46), T Hamill for M Cahill, A Flynn for J Forde (both 60), D Quinn for N McGrath (67). | J McGrath (0-6, 5 frees); N McGrath, R Maher (frees), M Breen (0-2 each); B Maher, J O’Dwyer (free) (0-1 each). |

Gaelic Grounds
Attendance: 16,089
Referee: C Lyons (Cork)

== 2017 Munster Senior Hurling Championship ==
=== Munster Quarter-final ===
The draw for the championship was held on 13 October 2016 and was broadcast live on RTÉ2. Tipperary were drawn to take on Cork in the Munster Quarter final on 21 May with the winners playing Waterford in the Munster Semi-Final.

On 4 May, Jason Forde was handed a one-match ban for his scuffle with Davy Fitzgerald in the League semi-final and missed the Munster Championship game against Cork. Tipperary confirmed that they would appeal against the one-match suspension. On 16 May it was confirmed that the appeal had failed and that the one-match suspension was upheld.

The match was shown live on RTÉ Two as part of the Sunday Game live, presented by Michael Lyster with analysis by Ger Loughnane, Henry Shefflin, and Cyril Farrell. Commentary on the game was provided by Ger Canning alongside Michael Duignan. This was the 85th championship match between Tipperary and Cork, with Tipperary ahead on 38 wins to Cork's 37 with 7 draws. Seamus Callanan returned to the Tipperary team at corner-forward with Patrick Maher only named as a substitute after injury while a hamstring injury ruled out Michael Cahill. Tipperary started with 13 of their All-Ireland winning team. Playing into the town end in the first half, Brendan Maher had a goal chance for Tipperary when running thru on goals in the fourth minute but his shot went over the bar for a point. The teams were level at 0–15 to 0–15 at half-time but Cork went on to win the game by four points on a 2–27 to 1-26 scoreline. Cork got the first goal in the game eight minutes into the second half when Shane Kingston scored with a low shot after he was initially hooked. John McGrath got a goal for Tipperary in the 57th minute when he shot powerfully to the right corner of the net from the left after a pass from Seamus Callanan. With Cork leading by a point, they went on to get their second goal in the 68th minute when the ball broke to Michael Cahalane behind the Tipperary defense where he went on to shoot low to the net. Conor Lehane of Cork was named by RTE as the man of the match.

Tipperary manager Michael Ryan speaking after the game felt that Tipperary have plenty to work on after this defeat saying "We were beaten by a better team today, I thought Cork were excellent in almost every facet of the game, there was a lot about our game that we will reflect on when we get time." The match had been described as one of the greatest Munster championship encounters of all-time with Henry Shefflin saying "Its a game we'll talk about for years to come. It ebbed and flowed from one side of the field to the other. It was just magnificent." The concession of 2-27 was the biggest by Tipperary in Munster Senior hurling history. Tipperary defender Cathal Barrett will be out of action for six weeks after injuring his left knee in the second half of the match.

21 May
16:00
Munster Quarter-Final

| Tipperary | 1–26 – 2–27 | Cork |
|---|---|---|
| S. Callanan (4 frees); M. Breen (0-6 each); J. McGrath (1-2); D. McCormack (0-3); John O’Dwyer (1 sideline), N. McGrath, B. Maher (0-2 each); S. Curran, Pádraic Maher, N. O’Meara (0-1 each). | Report D. Gleeson; C. Barrett J. Barry J. O’Keeffe; S. Kennedy R. Maher Pádraic Maher (c); B. Maher M. Breen; D. McCormack S. Curran N. McGrath; John O’Dwyer S. Callanan J. McGrath; Subs: N. O’Meara for S. Curran (51), Joe O’Dwyer for S. Kennedy (58), A. Flynn for C. Barrett (inj 64). | C. Lehane (0-10, 4 frees, 1 65); S. Kingston (1-4); P. Horgan (0-4); M. Cahalane (1-0); L. Meade, A. Cadogan (0-3 each); S. Harnedy (0-2); L. O’Farrell (0-1) |

Semple Stadium
Attendance: 30,013
Referee: J. Owens (Wexford)

== 2017 All-Ireland Senior Hurling Championship ==
After the defeat to Cork, Tipperary went on to play in the qualifiers of the All-Ireland Championship which started in July, the draw was held on the morning of 26 June. Tipperary were now the third favorites to win the All-Ireland title, priced at 4/1 with Paddy Power after the defeat to Cork. On 30 May it emerged that defender Cathal Barrett has been dropped from the Tipperary senior hurling panel for an internal issue. Barrett was due to be out of action for up to eight weeks with ligament damage. It later emerged that Barrett had been arrested on 27 May 2017 and charged with assaulting a barman at Hayes' Hotel in Thurles. He was found guilty in October 2018 of the charge.

=== 2017 All Ireland Qualifiers Round 1 ===
Tipperary were drawn to meet Westmeath in round 1 of the qualifiers, which was played at Semple Stadium on 1 July, it was the first time that the two teams had played each other in the championship. The team to play Westmeath was named on 29 June and showed six changes to the team that started the previous match against Cork. Darragh Mooney made his first championship start in goal in place of Darren Gleeson with Tomás Hamill and Joe O'Dwyer also coming into the starting team to make their first starts. Tipperary did not produce the performance that they wanted and struggled to beat Westmeath on the day. They had a 1–10 to 0–9 lead at half time and with seventeen minutes remaining, Westmeath were just three points behind, 0–12 to 1–12, when Cormac Boyle forced a save from Daragh Mooney which would have tied up the game. Tipperary had sixteen wides during the game. John O’Dwyer got Tipperary's first goal after 14 minutes when he scored from an acute angle after rounding the goalkeeper with John McGrath getting the second late in the match. Niall O'Meara received an ankle injury in the second half and was stretchered off which may end his season. Tipperary manager Michael Ryan was disappointed with some of the performances saying "some of the performances were below par and when performances are below par, you open the door to competition, a healthy thing, as far as I'm concerned."

1 July
17:00
All Ireland Qualifiers Round 1

| Tipperary | 2–18 – 0–15 | Westmeath |
|---|---|---|
| John O’Dwyer 1-3 (1f), Seamus Callanan 0-5 (4fs, 165), John McGrath 1-1, Noel McGrath, Niall O’Meara & Jason Forde 0-2 each, Ronan Maher, Brendan Maher and Patrick Maher 0-1 each | Report Daragh Mooney; James Barry, Tomás Hamill, Donagh Maher; Joe O’Dwyer, Ronan Maher, Pádraic Maher; Brendan Maher, Noel McGrath; Dan McCormack, Patrick Maher, Michael Breen; John O’Dwyer, Seamus Callanan, Niall O’Meara; Subs: Jason Forde for Breen (44), John McGrath for Callanan (45), Aidan McCormack for O’Meara (60), Steven O’Brien for Patrick Maher (64) Tom Fox for Pádraic Maher (68). | Allan Devine 0-6 (4fs), Paul Greville (1f) and Killian Doyle 0-2 each, Aonghus Clarke, Robbie Greville, Derek McNicholas, Niall O’Brien and Cormac Boyle 0-1 each |

Semple Stadium
Attendance: 6,893
Referee: Paud O’Dwyer (Carlow)

=== 2017 All Ireland Qualifiers Round 2 ===
In the draw which was held on 3 July, Tipperary were drawn to meet Dublin in round 2 of the qualifiers, which was played at Semple Stadium on 8 July as part of a double header with Kilkenny against Waterford being played after it. Dublin were unhappy with the match being fixed for Thurles. The team to play Dublin was named on 6 July and showed two changes to the team that started the previous match against Westmeath. Jason Forde and John McGrath come into the team in place of Noel McGrath and the injured Niall O'Meara. Darren Gleeson was recalled in place of the injured Daragh Mooney who was initially named on the team. In a match played in warm conditions, Tipperary had a 4–11 to 1–10 lead at half-time and went on to win comfortably by 6–26 to 1–19 with Seamus Callanan scoring 3–11.

Séamus Callanan scored his first goal in the eighth minute when he collected a Michael Breen pass and finished low and hard to the bottom left-hand corner. John McGrath got the next goal for Tipperary when he bundled the ball to the net after a high ball in from Pauric Maher. McGrath got his second when he lobbed the ball first-time over the advancing goalkeeper after a Séamus Callanan pass. Callanan got the fourth goal when he pulled from a tight angle on the right after a pass from Bonner Maher. 19 seconds into the second half Michael Breen ran from half way before scoring with a shot to the roof of the net. Séamus Callanan got the sixth goal and his third when he fired home in injury-time after being set up by John O’Dwyer. The 6–26 score was Tipperary's highest total in 92 years of championship hurling, one point short of the 12-9 (45 points) hit against Antrim in 1925.

8 July
17:00
All Ireland Qualifiers Round 2

| Tipperary | 6–26 – 1–19 | Dublin |
|---|---|---|
| Seamus Callanan 3-11 (0-7f), John McGrath 2-2, John O’Dwyer, Jason Forde 0-4 each, Michael Breen 1-0, Steven O’Brien 0-2, Padraic Maher, Brendan Maher, Dan McCormack 0-1 each. | Report D Gleeson; D Maher, T Hamill, J Barry; Joe O’Dwyer, R Maher, Pádraic Maher; B Maher, M Breen; J Forde, Patrick Maher, D McCormack; John O’Dwyer, S Callanan, J McGrath; Subs: S Kennedy for R Maher (45), N McGrath for B Maher (49), S O’Brien for D McCormack (49), M Cahill for D Maher (56), T Fox for Pádraic Maher (66). | David Treacy 0-11 (0-8f), Cian O’Sullivan 1-1, Liam Rushe, Ryan O’Dwyer 0-2 each, Chris Crummey, David O’Callaghan, Rian McBride 0-1 each. |

Semple Stadium
Attendance: 33,181
Referee: A Kelly (Galway)

=== 2017 All Ireland Quarter-final ===
In the draw which was held on 10 July, Tipperary were drawn to meet Clare in quarter-finals, which was to be played at the re-developed Páirc Uí Chaoimh on 22 July. The match was to be the first All-Ireland championship game at the venue since 1983.

The match was the first major fixture to be played at the venue. Tickets for the match were priced at €35 for the stand and €20 for the terrace with the game expected to be a sell-out. Tipperary declined the opportunity for a run-out at the re-developed Páirc Uí Chaoimh prior to the match. The team to play Clare was named on 20 July and showed three changes to the team that started the previous match against Dublin. Daragh Mooney returns as goalkeeper, with Séamus Kennedy, and Noel McGrath also coming into the team. The match was shown live on RTÉ Two as part of the Sunday Game live, presented by Michael Lyster with analysis by Ger Loughnane, Liam Sheedy, and Eddie Brennan. Commentary on the game was provided by Ger Canning alongside Michael Duignan.

Tipperary won the game on a 0–28 to 3-16 scoreline with John McGrath named as the man of the match after scoring six points from play. Playing into the city end in the first-half, Tipperary had led by 0–16 to 2–5 at half-time after out-scoring Clare by 0–7 to 0–2 in the closing ten minutes of the first half. Clare had scored two first half goals in a minute from Aaron Cunningham, the first in the nineteenth minute, a low shot past the advancing Daragh Mooney and the second when he rounded Mooney before shooting into the empty net after twenty minutes which tied the game at 2–3 to 0–9. Five minutes into the second half Seamus Callanan scored a point when a goal was on. Tipperary opened up a seven-point lead before Clare replied with five points and with five minutes to go Conor McGrath scored a point for Clare to cut Tipperary's lead to one point. Tipperary finished well and scored five points without replay from John O'Dwyer, Ronan Maher, John McGrath, and substitutes Steven O’Brien and Jason Forde before a late scrambled goal from Shane O’Donnell in the fifth minute of injury time cut the gap to three points with the final whistle going soon afterwards. Clare shot 18 wides to Tipperary's 13. Sean O'Brien made his championship debut for Tipperary with Mark Kehoe also on the bench for the first time.

22 July
15:00
Quarter Final

| Tipperary | 0–28 – 3–16 | Clare |
|---|---|---|
| S. Callanan (0-3 frees)(0-7); J. McGrath (0-6); J. O’Dwyer (0-1 free, N. McGrath (0-4 each); P. Maher, M. Breen (0-2 each); B. Maher (free), S. O’Brien, J. Forde (0-1 each) | Report D. Mooney; D Maher, T. Hamill, J. Barry; S. Kennedy, R Maher, P Maher (c); B. Maher, M. Breen; N. McGrath, Patrick Maher, D. McCormack; J. O’Dwyer, S. Callanan, J. McGrath; Subs: S. O’Brien for Barry (44); J. Forde for Breen (60); S. O’Brien for Callanan (68) | A. Cunningham (2-0), T. Kelly (0-4 frees)(0-6); S. O’Donnell (1-2); C. McGrath, D. Reidy (frees)(0-2 each); P. Duggan, C. McInerney, C. Galvin, J. Shanahan (0-1 each) |

Páirc Uí Chaoimh
Attendance: 28,567
Referee: Colm Lyons (Cork)

=== 2017 All Ireland Semi-final ===
Due to Tipperary and Waterford winning in the quarter-finals and both having already played Waterford, a draw was held on 24 July to decide who would play either Galway or Cork in the semi-finals. Tipperary were drawn to meet Galway in semi-finals in a match which will be played at Croke Park on 6 August. This will be the fourth year in a row that Tipperary met Galway in the Championship. It was also confirmed that Cathal Barrett would not be returning to the panel for the remainder of the season despite returning to club hurling after his injury. On 27 July, manager Michael Ryan speaking at a media event ahead of the semi-final said that "There will be no more changes to the panel in 2017." Before the match Tipperary were priced by Paddy Power at 2/1 to retain the All-Ireland title with Galway slight favorites at 15/8.

Tickets for the match were priced at €45 for the stands and €30 for the hill 16 terrace. The team to play Galway was announced on 4 August with two changes made, goalkeeper Darren Gleeson returned ahead of Darragh Mooney with Michael Cahill also coming into the team instead of Tomás Hamill, James Barry was also named at full-back. The starting team contains 14 of the team that won the 2016 All Ireland final. The match was shown live on RTÉ Two as part of the Sunday Game live, presented by Michael Lyster with analysis by Henry Shefflin, Liam Sheedy, and Cyril Farrell. Commentary on the game was provided by Ger Canning alongside Michael Duignan. The match was also live on Sky Sports presented by Rachel Wyse and Brian Carney with commentary by Nicky English and Mike Finnerty.

Playing into the hill 16 end in the first-half, Tipperary opened the scoring with a free from Séamus Callanan after three minutes, and after seven minutes they had a 4–2 lead after a point by John O’Dwyer. After 23 minutes, Tipperary scored a goal when John McGrath shot the ball from the ground to the net after a mishit by Seamus Callanan caused confusion for goalkeeper Colm Callanan who failed to deal with the ball with McGrath flicking the ball away from the goalkeeper and Daithi Burke before shooting low to the net. Two minutes later Seamus Callanan should have got a second goal but his flick was saved by Colm Callanan. Tipperary had led by 1–10 to 0–12 at half-time. With ten minutes to go Galway had a one-point lead on 0–19 to 1-15 before John McGrath leveled the score two minutes later with a point. With three minutes to go Galway went back in front with a long range point from Joe Canning. Brendan Maher then scored with a free two minutes into injury time to level the scores again. A long range free from Joe Canning a minute later was parried away by Darren Gleeson and cleared by James Barry, the ball was worked out to Joe Canning by Johnny Coen with Canning scoring the winning point for Galway in the fourth minute of added time from the right sideline, it was the fifth consecutive point that he scored for Galway. John O'Dwyer had a late chance to level the scores but hit his shot from the right touchline to the left and wide, as Galway held on to win by 0–22 to 1–18. The teams were level on 12 occasions and this was the third year in succession that one point separated the teams at the end. The free count was 17 to 8 in Galway's favour, 9 to 3 for Galway in the second half. Gearóid McInerney was named as the man of the match ahead of Conor Whelan and Pádraic Maher.

Tipperary manager Michael Ryan speaking after the game said that Tipperary has given there very best and saluted Joe Canning's winning point saying "Needless to say we have a very disappointed bunch in our dressing-room, that is what you do, you put your best out there and you do your absolute best, it is harsh on any team to lose that kind of a match, this is the exact reverse of what happened last year". Tipperary captain Pádraic Maher was devastated by the defeat saying "I'm absolutely devastated, the lads gave it everything, i think we did the Tipperary jersey proud."

6 August
16:00
Semi-Final

| Tipperary | 1–18 – 0–22 | Galway |
|---|---|---|
| S. Callanan (0-5, 3 frees); J. McGrath (1-1); J.O’Dwyer, B. Maher (1 free) (0-3 each); Pádraic Maher, N. McGrath (0-2 each); S. Kennedy, J. Forde (0-1 each) | Report D. Gleeson; D. Maher, J. Barry, M. Cahill; S. Kennedy, R. Maher, Pádraic Maher (c); B. Maher, D. McCormack; M. Breen, N. McGrath, Patrick Maher; J. O’Dwyer, S. Callanan, J. McGrath; Subs: S. Curran for D. McCormack (temp, 7-11), J. Forde for M. Breen (34), N. O’Meara for J. Forde (61). | J. Canning (0-11, 6 frees, 1 sideline, 1 65); C. Whelan (0-4); C. Cooney, J. Coen, J. Cooney (free) (0-2 each); C. Mannion (0-1). |

Croke Park
Attendance: 68,184
Referee: B Kelly (Westmeath)

== Awards ==
Sunday Game Team of the Year

The Sunday Game team of the year was picked on 3 September, which was the night of the final. The panel consisted of Brendan Cummins, Michael Duignan, Tomás Mulcahy, Jackie Tyrrell, Anthony Daly, Eddie Brennan and Cyril Farrell. Padraic Maher was the only Tipperary player named in the team at right half-back.

The PwC All-Star Awards

The nominations for the PwC All-Stars were announced on 20 September with Tipperary receiving 5 nominations – Pádraic Maher, Brendan Maher, John McGrath, Noel McGrath, and Séamus Callanan. The award winners were presented at a gala black tie banquet in Dublin's Convention Centre on 3 November. Pádraic Maher was the only Tipperary player named on the All-Star team. Maher was named at right half back to win his fifth award.

== Fenway Hurling Classic ==
On 19 November, Tipperary were in Boston to play Clare, competing for the Players Champions Cup in the semi-final of the 2017 Fenway Hurling Classic at Fenway Park. The winners would play the winners of the other semi-final between Galway and Dublin. Tipperary lost their semi-final to eventual winners Clare by 50–45. Clare had an 18-point lead with eight minutes to go but Tipperary, despite Patrick Maher having picked up a second yellow card, came back to within five points in the last minute. Clare had a 24–17 lead at half-time.

19 November 2017
13:30
Semi Final

| Tipperary | 45 – 50 | Clare |
|---|---|---|
| J McGrath 16, N McGrath 10, C Kenny 6, J O’Dwyer, G Browne 5 each, S Curran 3. | Report | P Duggan 25, T Kelly 8, C McGrath 6, I Galvin 5, D Fitzgerald, D Corry 3 each. |

Fenway Park, Boston
Attendance: 26,000
Referee: A Kelly (Galway)

Panel: Paul Maher, Patrick Maher, John O’Dwyer, Dan McCormack, Donagh Maher, Mark Kehoe, Michael Breen, Sean Curran, Tomas Hamill, Tom Fox, Conor Kenny.
Subs: Daragh Mooney, Alan Flynn, Paul Shanahan, Brendan Maher, Ger Browne, John McGrath, Noel McGrath, Séamus Callanan, Brian Hogan, Paul Maher, Sean O’Brien, Cian Darcy.

== 2018 season ==
On 26 September 2017, it was confirmed that Michael Ryan would continue as Tipperary manager on a new three-year term alongside coach Declan Fanning and selectors John Madden and Conor Stakelum. In October 2017, kit man John 'Hotpoint' Hayes left his position after 30 years when he was informed that he would not be required. Also goalkeeping coach Brian Horgan left after being involved for the previous two years.

== Retirements ==
On 21 October 2017, goalkeeper Darren Gleeson announced his retirement from inter-county hurling after ten years and 20 championship appearances, citing work and family commitments as the reasons.

Also in October, defender John O'Keeffe announced his retirement from inter-county hurling.
