= Tom Heffernan =

Thomas, Tom or Tommy Heffernan may refer to:

- Tommy Heffernan, Irish hurler
- Tom Heffernan (footballer) (born 1955), Irish footballer, see List of AFC Bournemouth players
- Tom Heffernan (screenwriter), English screenwriter, journalist & film-maker, see Brash Young Turks

== See also ==
- Thomas Heffernan Ho, Hong Kong equestrian
