= 2015 Tipperary county hurling team season =

Tipperary county hurling team
2015 season
Manager	Eamon O'Shea
Captain	Brendan Maher
All-Ireland SHC	Semifinalists
Munster SHC	Winners
National League	Semi-finalists
Waterford Crystal Cup	Quarter-finalists
Top scorer Championship	Séamus Callanan (5-20)
Highest SHC attendance	58,495 (v Galway 16 August)
Lowest SHC attendance	31,488 (v Limerick 21 June)
Colours

The 2015 season was Eamon O'Shea's third and final year as manager of the Tipperary senior hurling team.

In October 2014, O'Shea confirmed that he would stay on for a third year as Tipperary manager. It was also confirmed that Michael Ryan would succeed O'Shea as manager on a two-year term after the conclusion of the 2015 season. Declan Fanning also joined the back-room team for 2015 as a selector. Brendan Maher continued as captain for a second year with Pádraic Maher remaining as vice-captain.

On 15 March, Intersport/Elverys became the new sponsors of Tipperary GAA, a sponsorship that covers both the hurling and football codes and includes all grades from minor to senior inter-county teams for the next two years. The new look Tipperary jersey for the 2015 season was unveiled displaying the Intersport brand name on the front and their co-sponsor Elvery's name on the back. The new jersey was used for the first time against Kilkenny on 15 March in the National League.

On 17 April, it was announced that Noel McGrath would undergo surgery to help treat testicular cancer. He returned to the Tipperary panel in August and came on as a substitute in the All-Ireland Semi-final defeat to Galway.

== 2015 senior hurling management team ==
Name	Position	Club
Eamon O'Shea	Manager	Kilruane McDonaghs
Michael Ryan	Assistant Manager	Upperchurch-Drombane
Paudie O’Neill	Coach	St Mary's
Declan Fanning	Selector	Killenaule
Kieran McGeeney	Back room team	Mullaghbawn

=== 2015 squad ===
The following players made their competitive senior debut in 2015.

- Joe O'Dwyer against Dublin on 15 February
- John McGrath against Galway on 22 February
- John Meagher against Galway on 22 February
- Bill Maher against Limerick on 21 June

The Tipperary squad returned home from a pre-season holiday to Dubai on 5 January. It was confirmed on 7 January that Michael Cahill and James Barry would miss the majority of the National Hurling League. Barry had an operation to cure a hip problem and Cahill will have surgery on a similar problem. John Meagher, Michael Breen, and Bill Maher have been added to the Tipperary squad from the extended squad in 2014. Five newcomers were also named in the squad: David Butler, Liam Treacy, John McGrath, Sean Maher and Joe O’Dwyer.

No.	Player	Position	Club
1	Darren Gleeson	Goalkeeper	Portroe
2	Cathal Barrett	Right Corner Back	Holycross-Ballycahill
3	Paul Curran	Full back	Mullinahone
4	Joe O'Dwyer	Left Corner Back	Killenaule
5	Kieran Bergin	Right half back	Killenaule
6	Conor O'Mahony	Centre back	Newport
7	Pádraic Maher	Left half back	Thurles Sarsfields
8	Shane McGrath	Midfield	Ballinahinch
9	Brendan Maher	Midfield	Borris-Ileigh
10	Denis Maher	Right half Forward	Thurles Sarsfields
11	Patrick Maher	Centre forward	Lorrha-Dorrha
12	James Woodlock	Left half Forward	Drom-Inch
13	John O'Dwyer	Right Corner Forward	Killenaule
14	Séamus Callanan	Full forward	Drom-Inch
15	Jason Forde	Left Corner Forward	Silvermines

No.	Player	Position	Club
16	Darragh Egan	Substitute	Kildangan
17	Shane Bourke	Substitute	J.K. Bracken's
18	Michael Cahill	Substitute	Thurles Sarsfields
19	Paddy Stapleton	Substitute	Borris-Ileigh
20	James Barry	Substitute	Upperchurch-Drombane
21	Niall O'Meara	Substitute	Kilruane MacDonagh's
22	Noel McGrath	Substitute	Loughmore-Castleiney
23	Ronan Maher	Substitute	Thurles Sarsfields
24	Conor O'Brien	Substitute	Éire Óg Annacarty
25	Gearóid Ryan	Substitute	Templederry Kenyons
26	Thomas Stapleton	Substitute	Templederry Kenyons

== Challenge Games ==
On 11 January, Tipperary defeated Wexford by 2–15 to 0–16 in a Senior Hurling Challenge game played in Cashel. Wexford led by 0–10 to 1–4 at half time with the aid of the breeze. David Butler got the goal for Tipperary with the goal. Conor Kenny got the second goal as Tipperary won by five points. On 17 May, Tippeary lost on a 3–18 to 2-22 scoreline in a challenge at Upperchurch-Drombane GAA club, held to mark the opening of new facilities at the ground.

11 January
19:30

Tipperary	2–15 – 0–16	Wexford
Joe O’Dwyer (0-1), Thomas Stapleton (0-1), Sean Maher (0-1), Conor Kenny (1-2), David Butler (1-2), John O’Dwyer (0-2, 0-1 free), Seamus Callanan (0-4, 0-2 frees), Jason Forde (0-2)	Report Darren Gleeson; Joe O’Dwyer, Paul Curran, Michael Breen; Shane McGrath, Conor O’Mahony, Gearoid Ryan; Thomas Stapleton, James Woodlock; Denis Maher, Sean Maher, Conor Kenny; David Butler, John O’Dwyer, Niall O’Meara; Subs: Seamus Callanan for O’Meara, Micheal Butler for McGrath, Daniel Guinan (for O’Mahony, Jason Forde for John O’Dwyer)

Leahy Park Cashel

25 January

Tipperary	5–20 – 2–18	Kilmallock
	Darren Gleeson; S.Maher, Butler, OBrien; R.Maher, C.OMahony, P.Maher; Stapleton, Woodlock; G.Ryan, Brendan Maher, S.Maher; D.Butler, Callanan, Forde

17 May

Tipperary	3–18 – 2–22	Dublin
J McGrath 2-5 (0-2f), C Kenny 0-5, L McGrath 1-0, S Bourke & B Maher (2f) 0-2 each, C Ryan, S McGrath, P Maher & P Ryan (f) 0-1 each.	Report D Egan; Pádraig Stapleton, J Barry, T Treacy; Bill Maher, T Hamill, P Heffernan; S McGrath, A Ryan; S Bourke, D McCormack, C Ryan; L McGrath, C Kenny, J McGrath; Subs: T Comerford for Barry (20), K Morris for L McGrath, P Maher for C Ryan, K O'Dwyer for A Ryan, P Ryan for J McGrath (all half-time), Paddy Stapleton for Treacy (45), Brendan Maher for McCormack (56).	C Cronin 2-4, P Ryan 0-4 (2 65s, 1f), D Plunkett 0-3, C Dooley, D O'Connell, B Quinn, D Treacy & O O'Rorke 0-2 each, S Lambert 0-1.

Upperchurch-Drombane GAA Club
Referee: C Lyons (Cork)

== 2015 Waterford Crystal Cup ==
=== Summary ===
Séamus Callanan spared Tipperary's blushes with a second-half hat-trick of goals as Tipperary defeated Mary Immaculate College Limerick by 4–16 to 1–16 in the preliminary round of the Waterford Crystal Cup on 9 January. David Butler scored four points from corner forward after recently being added to the panel. Eamon O’Shea handed starts to newcomers Joe O’Dwyer, Stephen Maher, Liam Treacy, Sean Maher and David Butler. On 18 January, Tipperary travelled to O'Garney Park in Sixmilebridg to take on Clare in the Quarter-finals. In front of a crowd of 1,342, Tipperary lost the game by a point on a 0–15 to 0-16 scoreline. Clare led by 0–8 to 0–7 at half-time. An injury-time point from Colin Ryan was the crucial score to give Clare the victory.

=== Results ===
9 January
19:30
Preliminary round

Tipperary	4–16 – 1–16	Mary I
S Callanan 3–7 (0-4f, 0–1 65), D Butler 0–4, S Maher 1–1, Pádraic Maher, K Bergin (f), D Maher & C Kenny 0–1 each.	Report D Egan; J O’Dwyer, P Curran, Stephen Maher; S McGrath, C O’Mahony, Pádraic Maher; K Bergin, G Ryan; D Maher, L Treacy, Patrick Maher; Sean Maher, S Callanan, D Butler; Subs: J Woodlock for Stephen Maher (41), C Kenny for Butler (51), C Ryan for D Maher (63), Butler for Sean Maher (68), D Guinan for Callanan (68).	D Reidy 0–10 (8f), N O’Meara 1–1, D O’Donovan & T Gallagher (1 sl), 0–2 each, C Sheahan 0–1.

Dr. Morris Park Thurles
Referee: Nathan Wall (Cork)

18 January
14:00
Quarterfinal

Tipperary	0–15 – 0–16	Clare
B Maher 0-7 (5fs), Sean Maher, D Maher 0-2 each, T Stapleton, G Ryan, D Butler, S McGrath all 0-1 each.	Report D Egan; J O'Dwyer, P Curran, Stephen Maher; R Maher, C O'Mahony, C O'Brien; T Stapelton, G Ryan; D Maher, B Maher, J Woodlock; D Butler, Sean Maher, C Kenny; Subs: M Butler for O'Dwyer (ht), K Bergin for Ryan (49), P Maher for Butler (49), S McGrath for D Maher (60).	C O'Connell 0-4 (4fs), Colin Ryan (1f), P Donnellan, D O'Halloran 0-2, C Galvin, B Bugler, Conor Ryan, B Duggan, A Cunningham, P Flanagan all 0-1 each.

O'Garney Park, Sixmilebridge
Referee: J Murphy (Limerick)

== 2015 National Hurling League ==
=== Summary ===
Tipperary started their league campaign on 15 February with an away game against Dublin which was shown live on TG4. Tipperary lost the game by twelve points on a 2–20 to 0-14 scoreline. Tipperary had started with 11 of the side that lost the previous years All-Ireland final to Kilkenny, and were 1–11 to 0-5 down at half time. Speaking after the game Tipperary manager Eamon O’Shea said "It was a bad performance and I have no excuses, none, It concerns me alright. Dublin played some really good hurling and it was the opposite for us. We were reasonably optimistic coming here. We're only hurling one day a week at the moment, but I wouldn't use that as an excuse, We were beaten by a team who wanted to win the ball more than we did, so we're disappointed."

A week later on 22 February, Tipperary beat Galway by four points in 1–18 to 0–20 win at Semple Stadium. Tipperary were 10 points ahead with 25 minutes remaining before Galway came back. Speaking after the game to RTÉ Sport, Tipperary manager Eamon O’Shea said "The wind was swirling, and it was raining at times, So, it could have gone either way. We got a cushion after half-time, and it saw us over the line."

Next up on 8 March was an away game against Clare in Ennis. The game was shown live on TG4. At half-time, Tipperary were leading by 0–13 to 0-09. Tipperary won the game by 2–19 to 0–20 with James Woodlock getting the crucial second goal, shooting into the top corner of the net when he was sent clear by Séamus Callanan. Tipperary manager Eamon O'Shea was happy that his players' hard work paid off against Clare saying "t was good and I'm delighted for them because they've been working really hard all the time. The league goes up and down, I wouldn't be thinking everything's fine just because you win one or your lose one, I think the nature of the league is that, as you saw with Dublin and Cork yesterday, it will fluctuate. I'm just happy but again I'll say it's early March and the pitches don't run as quick."

On 15 March Tipperary defeated Kilkenny by 2–22 to 1–13 to qualify for the quarter-finals of the league with a game to spare. Goals in either half from Séamus Callanan and Niall O’Meara made it three wins in a row for Tipperary. The win was their first victory over Kilkenny since a League win two years previous, and just their second in the last 12 League and championship games against Kilkenny.

The last game against Cork took place on 22 March in Páirc Uí Rinn. Tipperary were losing by twelve points with fifteen minutes remaining, but came back to win by one point for their fourth league win in a row. Cork had led by 0–15 to 0–13 at half time. Tipperary manager Eamon O'Shea said that his side could easily have lost and attributed their come-from-behind one-point win to the players' belief and never-say-die attitude. Tipperary finished as division 1A winners and top seeds and played division 1B's fourth-placed team Offaly, in the quarter-finals on 29 March in Tullamore. Tipperary won the game on a 1–16 to 0-13 scoreline to qualify for a semi-final against Waterford on 19 April at Nowlan Park in Kilkenny. Kieran Bergin sustained an ankle ligament damage injury in the game and will miss the remainder of the League, while Seamus Callanan received a straight red card for an off the ball strike two minutes into the second half. Tipperary had a 1–14 to 0-4 half time lead in the game. Cathal Barrett received a second yellow card with six minutes to play with Tipperary finishing the game with thirteen men. Tipperary officials appealed against the red card received by Seamus Callananin was rejected by the GAA's Central Hearings Committee (CHC) on 2 April. The committee also turned down Cathal Barrett's appeal against the first of two yellow cards he was shown. On 6 April, the Tipperary panel left for hot weather training in Spain, returning on 11 April. On 16 April, Seamus Callanan's red card decision was rescinded by the CAC clearing him to play in the league semi-final against Waterford. The semi-final will be shown live on TG4. In the semi-final Tipperary lost by one point on a 2–15 to 1-19 scoreline after leading by 2–8 to 0–11 at half-time. Eamon O’Shea felt Tipperary were a bit flat during the game, saying "I thought during the week that we were a little bit off, but you never know for sure until the match comes along, Even when we were ahead I thought we were lacking energy and lacking composure, so I'd say we were a bit flat. Why? I'm not sure, it's very early after a game to be assessing that. Having said that they were beaten by a team that performed well on the day, good energy, good movement and so I'd have no complaints. I thought we might sneak it there with the extra-time because I did think we came back well, but having said that I think we have got something out of the league."

=== Results ===
15 February
14:00
Round 1

Tipperary	0–14 – 2–20	Dublin
J O'Dwyer 0-6 (1f), S Callanan 0-4 (3fs), J Woodlock, J Forde (f), S McGrath, C O'Brien 0-1 each	Report D Gleeson; Joe O'Dwyer, P Curran, C Barrett; K Bergin, C O'Mahony, Padraic Maher; S McGrath, J Woodlock; Brendan Maher (capt), J Forde, Dennis Maher; John O'Dwyer, S Callanan, G Ryan; Subs: Ronan Maher for D Maher (h-t), T Stapleton for McGrath (h-t), C Kenny for Ryan (45), C O'Brien for O'Mahony (52)	P Ryan 0-8 (4fs, 1'65'), E Dillon 1-2, L Rushe 1-1, D Sutcliffe, M Schutte 0-2 each, C Cronin, C Crummey, R O'Dwyer, S Durkin, C Boland 0-1 each

Parnell Park
Attendance: 5,000
Referee: B Kelly (Westmeath)
22 February
14:00
Round 2

Tipperary	2–18 – 0–20	Galway
S Callanan 1-3 (0-2fs), J O'Dwyer 1-1, K Bergin, J Forde 0-3 each, J McGrath 0-2, G Ryan, D Gleeson (f), R Maher, B Maher, D Maher, C Kenny 0-1 each.	Report D Gleeson; C Barrett, P Curran, C O'Brien; Michael Breen, P Maher, Ronan Maher; K Bergin, G Ryan; Dennis Maher, J Forde, B Maher (capt); John O'Dwyer, S Callanan, John McGrath; Subs: J Woodlock for Ryan (ht), C Kenny for D Maher (41), N McGrath for McGrath, J Meagher for Bergin (69).	J Flynn 0-4 (3fs, 1 sl), J Cooney, C Mannion 0-3 each, P Brehony J Regan, A Smith (1f) 0-2 each, I Tannian, J Glynn, C Barrett (own point), B Molloy 0-1 each.

Semple Stadium
Attendance: 4,176
Referee: J McGrath (Westmeath)
8 March
14:00
Round 3

Tipperary	2–19 – 0–20	Clare
S Callanan 0-7 (5fs), J McGrath 0-5, J O'Dwyer 0-4 (2fs), J Woodlock, N McGrath 1-0 each, M Breen 0-2, J Forde 0-1	Report D Gleeson; C Barret, C O'Mahony, C O'Brien; M Breen, P Maher, R Maher; K Bergin, J Woodlock; J O'Dwyer, C Kenny, N O'Meara; N McGrath, S Callanan, J McGrath; Subs: J Forde for Kenny (50), G Ryan for O'Meara (56), S McGrath for N McGrath (61), S Bourke for J McGrath (66), T Stapleton for Woodlock (72).	Colin Ryan 0-8 (8fs), Conor Ryan 0-5, J Conlon, T Kelly (1f) 0-2 each, S O'Donnell, C McGrath, C Galvin 0-1 each

Cusack Park
Attendance: 7,363
Referee: B Gavin (Offaly)
15 March
14:00
Round 4

Tipperary	2–22 – 1–13	Kilkenny
S Callanan 1-7 (3f, 1 '65'), N O'Meara 1-2, J O'Dwyer 0-4, N McGrath 0-3, M Breen 0-2, P Maher, J Forde, S Bourke, J Woodlock 0-1 each.	Report D Gleeson; C Barrett, C O'Mahony, P Curran; M Breen, P Maher, R Maher; K Bergin, J Woodlock; J O'Dwyer, B Maher, J Forde; N McGrath, S Callanan, N O'Meara Subs: C O'Brien for Curran (30), S McGrath for Forde (51), J McGrath for O'Meara (58), S Bourke for N McGrath (62), D Egan for Gleeson (65).	R Hogan 0-10 (6f), J Farrell 1-1, M Kelly, J Power 0-1 each ('65)

Semple Stadium
Attendance: 10,421
Referee: J McGrath (Westmeath)
22 March
14:00
Round 5

Tipperary	2–28 – 4–21	Cork
S Callanan 0-10 (5f), N McGrath 0-7 (1f), J Forde 1-4, N O'Meara 0-3, K Bergin 1-0, J O'Dwyer, R Maher, C Kenny, T Stapleton 0-1 each.	Report D Egan; P Stapleton, C O'Mahony, C O'Brien; R Maher, Paudie Maher, K Bergin; S McGrath, T Stapleton; N McGrath, B Maher, J Forde; J O'Dwyer, S Callanan, N O'Meara; Subs: Patrick Maher for B Maher (32), M Breen for S McGrath, S Bourke for O'Dwyer (both h-t), J Woodlock for T Stapleton (56), C Kenny for O'Meara (62).	P Horgan 2-8 (6f), S Harnedy 0-5, C Lehane 1-1, P O'Sullivan 1-0, C Murphy, D Kearney 0-2 each, A Walsh, R O'Shea, A Cadogan 0-1 each

Páirc Uí Rinn
Referee: B Kelly (Westmeath)
29 March
15:00
Quarter-final

Tipperary	1–16 – 0–13	Offaly
Callanan 1-6 (4f), K Bergin & B Maher 0-3 each, J Forde, R Maher, N McGrath, N O'Meara 0-1 each	Report D Egan; P Stapleton, C O'Mahony, C Barrett; M Breen, Padraic Maher, R Maher; J Woodlock, K Bergin; J Forde, B Maher, Patrick Maher; N McGrath, S Callanan, N O'Meara; Subs: S McGrath for K Bergin (inj 43), S Bourke for N O'Meara (54), C Kenny for J Forde (60), S Maher for Patrick Maher (69)	S Dooley 0-7 (3f, 1 '65), J Bergin, S Quirke & B Carroll 0-2 each

O'Connor Park
Referee: J Keenan (Wicklow)
19 April
16:00
Semi-final

Tipperary	2-15 - 1-19	Waterford
S Callanan 0-8(6fs, 1 65); J O’Dwyer 1-1; P Maher 1-0; N O’Meara 0-2; J Forde, J Woodlock, P Maher, C Kenny 0-1 each.	Report D Gleeson; P Stapleton, C O’Mahony, P Curran; M Breen, Padraic Maher, R Maher; J Woodlock, S McGrath; J O’Dwyer, B Maher, J Forde; S Callanan, Patrick Maher, N O’Meara; J Barry for Stapleton (43), S Bourke for O’Dwyer (45), C Kenny for Forde (53), G Ryan for McGrath (58), J Meagher for Curran (66).	Pauric Mahony 0-13(11fs, 1 65); C Dunford 1-1; M Shanahan 0-3; J Dillon, J Barron 0-1 each

Nowlan Park
Attendance: 16,445
Referee: Barry Kelly (Westmeath)

== 2015 Munster Senior Hurling Championship ==
Tipperary were drawn to take on the winners of the Munster quarter-final between Clare and Limerick in a game which will be held on 21 June at the Gaelic Grounds in Limerick. Limerick beat Clare on a 1–19 to 2-15 scoreline.

On 30 April the Tipperary senior panel was reduced in size with former captain Paul Curran being cut from the panel. Tom Stapleton, Shane Bourke, David Butler, Micheal Butler, Bill Maher, Sean Maher, Stephen Maher, Joe O’Dwyer and Liam Treacy were also released from the squad. On 1 May Paul Curran announced his retirement from inter-county hurling.

The match against Limerick was played in front of a bumper crowd in excess of 30,000, and was shown live on RTÉ2 on The Sunday Game live with commentary from Ger Canning and Michael Duignan . Tipperary were hoping to win their first Munster Championship match since the final in 2012. The Tipperary team was announced on Friday 19 June with John O’Dwyer starting following a recent injury scare. Eleven of the side that started the 2014 All Ireland Final replay were named in the team.

Limerick playing with the wind in the first half opened up a three-point lead after nine minutes before Tipperary came into the game to lead by six points at half time on a 2–12 to 0-12 scoreline. Seamus Callanan scored both of the goals in the first half for Tipperary with two low shots to the net. Tipperary failed to score in the first fourteen minutes of the second half as Limerick narrowed to the lead to one point on a 2–12 to 1-14 scoreline, the Limerick goal coming from a penalty by Shane Dowling after Darren Gleeson had made three saves previous to the foul for the penalty. Tipperary came back into the game with Jason Forde getting their first point before they went on to win the final 20 minutes of the game by 2–11 to 0–2.

Jason Forde got the third goal for Tipperary with a low shot to the corner from the left with substitute Michael Breen getting the fourth goal in injury time. The 16-point win was Tipperary's biggest Munster Championship success over Limerick for 53 years. John O'Dwyer was named as the man of the match on the Sunday game by Dónal O'Grady and Brendan Cummins.

Tipperary manager Eamon O'Shea speaking after the game said "I'm proud of the players, the players are really good and working with these boys is such a joy. It gives me energy and that's why I really want to see them do well. But for me? I'm not in the picture here. The players are the real heroes and I just sit and watch them. They have an awful lot to do yet to get anywhere where they want to be but it's never about the manager, ever." O'Shea also admitted he was surprised by the 16-point winning margin saying ""It probably was more emphatic than we thought. I thought there was still a lot of hurling left in the game. I thought we held our nerve when they came back at us and showed a lot of resilience. The experience gained over the last couple of years has been really good for us, you know?"

Tipperary played Waterford in the Munster Final on 12 July at Semple Stadium.

In the final Tipperary won by five points on a 0–21 to 0-16 scoreline. The win was Tipperary's 41st Munster Senior title and first since 2012.

Tipperary made two changes to the team that defeated Limerick with Michael Breen making his full championship debut at right half-back and the fit again Cathal Barrett taking over from injured Paddy Stapleton at right corner back. Conor O’Brien is replaced by Ronan Maher in the full back line. The match was shown live on RTÉ Two as part of The Sunday Game Live with commentary from Marty Morrissey and Michael Duignan.

Tipperary got the opening point with a strike from Niall O’Meara with Colin Dunford getting Waterford's first score to make it two points to one after 5 minutes. Tipperary opened up a four-point lead after 12 minutes on a six points to two scoreline and had a 0–10 to 0–9 lead at half time, helped by four Seamus Callanan points. Jason Forde got the opening score of the second half to push Tipperary's lead to two points. Maurice Shanahan got the equalizing score for Waterford in the 43rd minute to make the score 0-11 each. John O'Dwyer got his third point in the 58th minute to open up a three-point lead for Tipperary. Lar Corbett then increased the lead to four with a long range shot. Seamus Callanan scored another point from a 65 to increase the lead back to four after Maurice Shanahan had got one back for Waterford. Two more points from Tipperary increase the lead to five points before both teams traded points to leave the final score 0–21 to Tipperary, 0–16 to Waterford.

Eamon O'Shea who picked up his first major trophy said "I thought we started well, we tried to keep the ball open. In the second-half I thought we did better, we moved the ball. We got a few breaks at various times and managed to get the points. I don't always feel the silverware is as important as the outside thinks, but it is important. I thought it important we stayed at the game - they're a resilient bunch, they’ve been through a fair bit." "We had nine Munster final debutants, sometimes people think we’ve been going since the year 2000. We had nine people who played their first Munster final there - I think that's good, to have that transition. I thought a five-point win - maybe those who watch the game don't call it a close game, but for me it was as close as it gets. I didn't relax until the last minute of play." "We’ve been through close games and sometimes we’ve come out the wrong side of them, but you have to be careful judging a team who come out the wrong side of a game by a point or two. I was always happy the team would be capable of winning a really tight match, and today was a really tight match." On The Sunday Game on the night of the match, Tipperary captain Brendan Maher was named as the man of the match by a panel consisting of Donal Óg Cusack and Eddie Brennan. The other nominees were Tipperary's Cathal Barrett and Waterford's Maurice Shanahan.

=== Results ===
21 June
16:00
Munster Semi-final

Tipperary	4–23 – 1–16	Limerick
S Callanan 2-5 (0-2fs, 0-1 '65'), J O'Dwyer 0-7 (1 '65'), J Forde 1-3, Patrick Maher 0-3, M Breen 1-0, S McGrath 0-2, N O'Meara, J Woodlock, S Bourke 0-1 each.	Report Darren Gleeson; Paddy Stapleton, James Barry, Conor O'Brien; Kieran Bergin, Padraic Maher, Ronan Maher; James Woodlock, Shane McGrath; Jason Forde, Brendan Maher (capt), Patrick Maher; John O'Dwyer, Seamus Callanan, Niall O'Meara; Subs: Michael Cahill for Stapleton (35+1), Shane Bourke for O'Meara (60), Bill Maher for McGrath (69), Michael Breen for Callanan (70).	S Dowling 1-7(0-4fs, 1-0 pen, 0-2 '65s), D Hannon 0-3, G Mulcahy 0-2, D O'Grady, D Breen, G O'Mahony, S O'Brien 0-1 each.

Gaelic Grounds
Attendance: 31,488
Referee: B Gavin (Offaly)
12 July
16:00
Munster Final

Tipperary	0–21 – 0–16	Waterford
Seamus Callanan 0-6 (0-4f, 0-2 65), John O’Dwyer 0-5 (0-2f), Niall O’Meara 0-3, Jason Forde 0-2, Patrick Maher 0-2, Michael Breen 0-1, Lar Corbett 0-1, Shane Bourke 0-1	Report Darren Gleeson; Cathal Barrett, James Barry, Michael Breen; Kieran Bergin, Pádraic Maher, Ronan Maher; James Woodlock, Shane McGrath; Jason Forde, Brendan Maher, Patrick Maher; John O’Dwyer, Séamus Callanan, Niall O’Meara; Subs: Lar Corbett for Michael Breen (HT), Shane Bourke for Jason Forde (67), Conor O’Brien for Shane McGrath (70).	Maurice Shanahan 0-8 (0-3f, 0-2 65), Kevin Moran 0-2, Austin Gleeson 0-2, Shane Fives 0-2, Patrick Curran 0-1, Colin Dunford 0-1

Semple Stadium
Attendance: 43,084
Referee: James Owens (Wexford)

== 2015 All-Ireland Senior Hurling Championship ==
By winning the Munster championship, Tipperary qualified for the semi-finals of the All-Ireland championship on 16 August at Croke Park. Tipperary found out there opponents in the semi-final on 26 July after Galway defeated Cork in the quarter-final by 2–18 to 0–22 at Semple Stadium in Thurles.

It was the second year in a row that Tipperary would meet Galway in the Championship after Tipperary won by 3-25 - 4–13 in 2014 in the first round of the qualifiers. Tickets for the match ranged in price from €40 for the stands to €25 for Hill 16. The match was shown live on RTÉ2 and on Sky Sports with commentary from Marty Morrissey and Michael Duignan. Michael Lyster presented from the Croke Park studio with analysts Cyril Farrell, Ger Loughnane, and Liam Sheedy.

In a game that looked like it was going to end in a draw, Galway substitute Shane Moloney scored with practically the last puck of the game to win it for Galway by a point. The match has been called a classic and the best hurling match of 2015.

Tipperary made one change to the team that won the Munster Final with Conor O’Brien starting instead of Michael Breen at left-corner back.

Playing into the Hill 16 end, Séamus Callanan scored a goal for Tipperary after 38 seconds when he caught a long ball into the square ahead of Padraig Mannion before turning and firing to the net. After nine minutes Cyril Donnellan was brought down as he went in on goal with Darren Gleeson saving Joe Canning's penalty strike to his right. Galway had a one-point lead at half time on a 0–13 to 1-9 scoreline with two of their points coming in first half stoppage time. Galway got the opening score in the second half, a sideline cut after two minutes. Two minutes later, Séamus Callanan got his second goal when gets up above Padraig Mannion to win the dropping ball and fire low to the left of the goalkeeper to put Tipperary a point in front. The sides were level again after 52 minutes when in the next minute Seamus Callanan got his third goal when he again beat Padraig Mannion on the left before shooting low past the goalkeeper to put Tipperary three points up. With eight minutes to go Noel McGrath came on for Tipperary, four months after having surgery for testicular cancer. With five minutes to go Tipperary were awarded a penalty when Callanan was cynically pulled down by John Hanbury. Callanan took the penalty, shooting it over the bar to put Tipperary a point in front again. The sides were level again before Noel McGrath put Tipperary a point in front in the last minute. In the first minute of stoppage time Jason Flynn leveled the scores before Shane Moloney scored the winning point with fifteen seconds left of the third and last minute of stoppage time. The referee played ten seconds over the three minutes before blowing the whistle for full-time.

Séamus Callanan who finished with 3-9 was awarded the man of the match by The Sunday Game panel beating Galway's Jason Flynn and Colm Callanan to the award. Des Cahill presented The Sunday Game highlights programme on the night of the match with guests Donal Óg Cusack, Henry Shefflin, and Anthony Daly.

The match was Eamon O'Shea's last game as Tipperary manager as he had planned to leave the position at the end of the 2015 Championship. Michael Ryan took over as manager from 2016. The Tipperary County Board thanked O'Shea for his services to the county.

Speaking after the game, O'Shea said "Tipperary is over for me, being involved with Tipperary is over for me, we did what we could, we tried to play the game in a particular way. There are men in Tipperary who can carry this on. I just feel that we gave it everything every time we went out. We tried to win. We didn't always win. We were beaten by a point, beaten by three points. It doesn't look great sometimes but we did our utmost to win these games. I said to the players, the belief I have in them and the belief I have that they can continue and go on and grow better when I'm not there is really strong. Somebody else will go on and do this better than I did. That's all you can do."

Speaking in August 2016, Tipperary captain Brendan Maher called the defeat one of the toughest in his career saying "Last year's semi-final defeat was one of the toughest I have had in my career, but then in saying that I remember crying for days after the 2009 All-Ireland, the 2011 defeat, and in 2014, being captain there was a little bit more on the line for myself."

=== Result ===
16 August
16:00
All Ireland Semifinal

Tipperary	3–16 – 0–26	Galway
S Callanan 3-9 (2f, 0-1 pen, 1 '65'), J O'Dwyer 0-2 (1f), J Forde 0-1, B Maher 0-1, Patrick Maher 0-1, C O'Mahony 0-1, N McGrath 0-1	Report Darren Gleeson; Cathal Barrett, James Barry, Connor O'Brien; Ronan Maher, Pádraic Maher, Kieran Bergin; James Woodlock, Shane McGrath; Jason Forde, Brendan Maher, Patrick Maher; John O’Dwyer, Séamus Callanan, Niall O’Meara; Subs: S Bourke for Forde (HT), L Corbett for McGrath (56), N McGrath (0-1) for Bourke (62), C O'Mahony (0-1) for Woodlock (63), M Breen for R Maher (70).	J Canning (0-10, 6 frees, 1 65, 1 sideline); C Mannion, J Flynn (1 free) (0-5 each); David Burke, J Whelan (0-2 each); A Smith, S Moloney (0-1 each).

Croke Park
Attendance: 58,495
Referee: B Kelly (Westmeath

== Awards ==
The Sunday Game team of the year was picked on 6 September, which was the night of the 2015 All-Ireland Final. Tipperary had two players named in the team for 2015, Cathal Barrett was picked at number four with Seamus Callinan picked at full forward. On 10 September, Séamus Callanan was named as the Opel GPA/GAA player of the month for August. In October, Seamus Callanan was named as one of the three nominees for the Hurler of the Year award.

The All Star nominees were announced in October with Darren Gleeson, Pádraic Maher, Cathal Barrett, James Barry, Brendan Maher, John O’Dwyer, and Séamus Callanan being nominated for awards. The winners of the hurling awards were announced on 5 November with the awards ceremony being held on 6 November in the National Convention Centre in Dublin. Séamus Callinan picked up Tipperary's only award and his second All Star award, being picked at full-forward.

== 2016 Season ==
In October 2014, it had been confirmed that assistant manager Michael Ryan would succeed Eamon O'Shea as the Tipperary manager after the conclusion of the 2015 season. In November 2015, it was confirmed that Ryan would be assisted by former Tipperary player's John Madden as a sector and Declan Fanning as a coach in 2016. 1995 All-Ireland Under-21 Hurling Championship winning captain Brian Horgan was added to the backroom team on 20 November. Brendan Maher was confirmed as captain for 2016 in December with Pádraic Maher retaining the role of vice-captain.

== Retirements ==
On 30 April, Paul Curran announced his retirement from inter-county hurling. In May, Curran accepted a position as a member of the backroom team for the 2015 championship.

On 13 November, Conor O'Mahony announced his retirement from inter-county hurling. He made his last appearance in the All Ireland semi-final defeat against Galway. In a statement he said "Having had the great honour of playing with Tipperary at all levels over the last 15 years, I have decided to call time on my inter-county hurling career. It was a huge privilege for me to play with Tipperary, I will have great memories from my time as a Tipperary player and particularly of 2010 when we won the All Ireland senior hurling championship."

On 14 November, James Woodlock announced his retirement from inter-county hurling. In a statement he said "It has been a great honour for me to have been part of Tipperary hurling teams at minor, under 21 and senior level but the time has now come for me to announce my retirement from the inter-county scene, I have thoroughly enjoyed being part of the Tipperary senior hurling panel and I am very grateful to the managers who gave me the opportunity to play for the county."

On 17 November, Shane McGrath also announced his retirement from inter-county hurling. In a statement he said "After over 10 years on the Tipperary senior hurling panel, I have decided that now is the right time to announce my retirement from inter-county hurling, It was a great honour and privilege for me to play with Tipperary and I will greatly miss being involved with the special group of people that is the Tipperary senior hurling panel. I have many great memories and made many lifelong friendships over the last decade or so. I want to thank all the players sincerely. While we endured some disappointments, we had so many great times together and we have always been united in our ambition and commitment to bring success to Tipperary."

On 18 November 2015, Lar Corbett announced his retirement from inter-county hurling. In a statement he said "Over the past 15 years I have enjoyed many great times playing senior hurling with Tipperary but I've decided that now is the time to announce my retirement. It was a huge honour for me to play with Tipperary and I have many great memories and friendships from my time on the panel."
