= Niall Curran =

Irish Gaelic footballer (born 1980)

Personal information
- Native name: Niall Ó Corráin (Irish)
- Born: 1980 (age 45–46) Mullinahone, County Tipperary, Ireland
- Occupation: EHS Officer

Sport
- Sport: Gaelic football
- Position: Full-back
Club
- Years: Club
- Mullinahone
Club titles
	Football	Hurling
Tipperary titles	0	1
Inter-county
- Years: County
- 2004-2011: Tipperary
Inter-county titles
- Munster titles: 0
- All-Irelands: 0
- NFL: 0
- All Stars: 0

Niall Curran (born 1980) is an Irish Gaelic footballer who played as a full-back for the Tipperary senior team.

Born in Mullinahone, County Tipperary, Curran first played competitive Gaelic games during his schooling at Scoil Ruáin. He arrived on the inter-county scene at the age of sixteen when he first linked up with the Tipperary minor team before later joining the under-21 side. He joined the senior panel during the 2004 championship. Curran later became a regular member of the starting fifteen and won one Tommy Murphy Cup medal.

Curran was a member of the Munster inter-provincial team on a number of occasions. At club level he is a one-time championship medallist as a hurler with Mullinahone.

His brothers, Paul and Seán, have also represented Tipperary in hurling.

He retired from inter-county football following the conclusion of the 2011 championship.

In retirement from playing Curran became involved in team management and coaching, most notably as a selector with the Tipperary under-21 hurling team.

== Honours ==
=== Player ===
Mullinahone

- Tipperary Senior Hurling Championship (1): 2002

Tipperary

- Tommy Murphy Cup (1): 2005
