= Ger Browne =

Irish hurler

Personal information
- Native name: Gearóid de Brún (Irish)
- Nickname: brownerz
- Born: 10 May 1998 (age 28) County Tipperary, Ireland
- Occupation: Student
- Height: 6 ft 0 in (183 cm)

Sport
- Sport: Hurling
- Position: Wing Forward
Club
- Years: Club
- Cashel King Cormacs
Club titles
- Tipperary titles: 1
College
- Years: College
- 2016-present: TUS
College titles
- Fitzgibbon titles: 0
Inter-county*
Years	County	Apps (scores)
2017-present	Tipperary	17 (1-14)
Inter-county titles
- Munster titles: 1
- All-Irelands: 3
- NHL: 0
- All Stars: 1
- *Inter County team apps and scores correct as of 11:59, 7 August 2019.

Ger Browne (born 10 May 1998) is an Irish hurler who played for Tipperary Senior Hurling Championship with Cashel King Cormacs and at inter-county level with the Tipperary senior hurling team. He usually lines out as a midfielder.

== Playing career ==
=== Knockavilla-Donaskeigh Kickhams ===
Browne joined the Knockavilla–Donaskeigh Kickhams club at a young age and played in all grades at juvenile and underage levels before eventually joining the club's top adult team. In 2021 he transferred from Knockavilla Donaskeigh Kickhams to Cashel King Cormacs along with his brother Aaron Browne and his cousins Nathan Ryan and Devon Ryan, all of whom were County hurlers.

=== Tipperary ===
==== Minor and under-21 ====
Browne made his first appearance for the Tipperary minor team on 23 April 2016 when he scored two points from right wing-forward in a 1–20 to 1–17 defeat by Waterford in the Munster Championship. On 10 July 2016, he was switched to midfield and scored two points from play when Tipperary defeated Limerick by 1–24 to 0–10 to win the Munster final. On 4 September 2016, Browne was again at midfield when Tipperary renewed their rivalry with Limerick in the All-Ireland final. He ended the game with a winners' medal following the 1–21 to 0–17 victory.

On 22 June 2017, Browne made his first appearance for the Tipperary under-21 team. He top scored with five points in the 2–24 to 0–19 defeat by Limerick in the Munster Championship. Browne was later nominated for the Team of the Year.

On 4 July 2018, Browne scored four points from play in Tipperary's 2–23 to 1–13 defeat by Cork in the Munster final. On 26 August 2018, both Tipperary and Cork faced each other again in the All-Ireland final. Browne ended the game with a winners' medal after scoring three points in the 3–13 to 1–16 victory. He ended the year by being named at midfield on the Team of the Year and u21 hurler of the year.

==== Senior ====
Browne was drafted onto the Tipperary senior team prior to the start of the 2018 National League. He made his first appearance for the team on 28 January 2018 when he lined out at right corner-forward in Tipperary's 1–21 to 0–19 defeat by Clare. On 8 April 2018, Browne was an unused substitute when Tipperary suffered a 2–23 to 2–17 defeat by Kilkenny in the National League final. He made his Munster Championship debut on 27 May 2018 when he came on as a 70th-minute substitute for Billy McCarthy at midfield in a 2–20 to 1–23 draw with Cork.

On 30 June 2019, Browne selected on the bench when Tipperary faced Limerick in the Munster final. He remained on the bench for the entire game and ended on the losing side following the 2–26 to 2–14 defeat. On 18 August 2019, Browne won an All-Ireland medal as asubstitute coming on and scoring a point from play following Tipperary's 3–25 to 0–20 defeat of Kilkenny in the final.

== Career statistics ==
As of match played 18 August 2019.

Team	Year	National League			Munster		All-Ireland		Total	
Team	Year	Division	Apps	Score	Apps	Score	Apps	Score	Apps	Score
Tipperary	2018	Division 1A	3	0-00	1	0-00	—		4	0-00
Tipperary	2019	Division 1A	1	0-00	2	0-00	2	0-03	5	0-03
Career total			4	0-00	3	0-00	2	0-03	9	0-03

== Honours ==
Tipperary

- All-Ireland Senior Hurling Championship (1): 2019
- All-Ireland Under-21 Hurling Championship (1): 2018
- All-Ireland Minor Hurling Championship (1): 2016
- Munster Minor Hurling Championship (1):2016
