= Joe O'Dwyer =

Irish hurler

Sport
- Sport: Hurling
- Position: Corner-Back
Club
- Years: Club
- Killenaule
Inter-county
Years	County	Apps (scores)
2015–	Tipperary	2 (0-0)

Joe O'Dwyer is an Irish sportsperson. He plays hurling with his local club Killenaule and with the Tipperary senior inter-county team since 2015. He is a cousin of fellow Tipperary hurler John O'Dwyer.

== Career ==
O'Dwyer was named in the Tipperary squad for the 2015 National Hurling League and made his league debut on 15 February against Dublin starting at right corner back in a 2-20 to 0-14 defeat in Parnell Park.

On 21 May 2017, O'Dwyer made his championship debut when he came on as a second half substitute in the 1-26 to 2-27 defeat to Cork in the 2017 Munster Senior Hurling Championship.

O'Dwyer made his first championship start for Tipperary on 1 July 2017 in the 2-18 to 0-15 win against Westmeath in round 1 of the All Ireland Qualifiers in Semple Stadium.
