= 2007 Tipperary county hurling team season =

Tipperary county hurling team
2007 season
Manager	Babs Keating
All-Ireland SHC	Quarter-finalists
Munster SHC	Semi-finalists
National League	Quarter-finalists
Top scorer SHC	Eoin Kelly (1-38)
Highest SHC attendance	42,364 (v Wexford 28 July)
- Lowest SHC attendance
Standard colours

The 2007 season was Babs Keating's second season in charge of the Tipperary senior hurling team in his second spell after previously being in charge from 1986 until 1994. Benny Dunne was the captain for the year and the team were sponsored by Enfer Scientific.

== Summary ==
In the Munster championship, Tipperary played Limerick in the semi-finals on 10 June, with the game ending in a draw 1-19 to 1-19. The replay was held six days later with manager Babs Keating dropping goalkeeper Brendan Cummins from the team and replacing him with Gerry Kennedy. Tipperary had a ten point lead at one stage, however, by the end of the seventy minutes both sides were level once again. A period of extra-time failed to separate the two sides and so a second replay was required. Once again extra-time had to be played, however, after nearly four hours of hurling Limerick emerged as the winners by 0-22 to 2-13.

The All-Ireland qualifiers saw Tipperary win all of their games, including a victory over Cork for the first time since 1991.

Tipperary went on to play Wexford in the All-Ireland quarter-finals on 28 July at Croke Park. A goal from a free by Damien Fitzhenry in the last minute sealed the victory for Wexford and eliminated Tipperary from the championship. It was Wexford's first win in the championship against Tipperary since 1968. Keating resigned as manager on 7 August.

== 2007 National Hurling League ==
=== Division 1B table ===
Pos	Team	Pld	W	D	L	F	A	Pts	Notes
1	Kilkenny	5	3	1	1	7-89	5-67	7	Division 1 runners-up
2	Galway	5	3	0	2	4-94	7-60	6	
3	Tipperary	5	3	0	2	11-68	5-69	6	
4	Dublin	5	2	1	2	5-63	7-70	5	
5	Limerick	5	2	0	3	8-66	2-85	4	
6	Antrim	5	1	0	4	1-57	10-86	2	

18 February 2007 Round 1	Tipperary	0-16 - 2-13	Limerick	MacDonagh Park, Nenagh
	E Kelly (0-12, seven frees, two 65s), L Corbett (0-3), P Kelly (0-1).	Report	A O'Shaughnessy (1-8, eight frees), O Moran (1-1), N Moran (0-2), M O'Brien (0-1), B Foley (0-1).	Referee: D Murphy(Wexford)

4 March 2007 Round 2	Kilkenny	2-13 - 3-13	Tipperary	Nowlan Park, Kilkenny
	R Power 0-7 (5f), E Brennan 1-1, M Comerford 1-0, E McCormack, B Hogan, J Dalton (65) 0-1 each.	Report	D O'Hanlon 2-1, P Kelly 1-3, E Kelly 0-6 (6f), J Carroll 0-2, B Dunne 0-1.	Referee: B Kelly (Westmeath)

18 March 2007 Round 3	Tipperary	1-11 - 0-8	Antrim	Páirc Shíleáin, Templemore
	E Kelly 0-7, P Bourke 1-1, W Ryan, C O Mahoney 0-1 each.	Report	B McFall 0-4, K McKeegan 0-3, B Herron 0-1.	Referee: J O'Mahoney (Limerick)

25 March 2007 Round 4	Galway	0-26 - 3-13	Tipperary	Pearse Stadium, Galway
	E Cloonan 0-10 (8f, 1 '65); M Kerins 0-4; I Tannion 0-3; A Kerins, R Murray, N Healy, D Hayes 0-2 each; F Healy 0-1.	Report	P Kelly 2-2; W Ryan 0-6f; E Kelly 1-0; E Corcoran 0-2 (2 sidelines); H Moloney, R O'Dwyer, P Bourke all 0-1 each.	Referee: M Wadding (Waterford)

1 April 2007 Round 5	Tipperary	4-15 - 1-9	Dublin	MacDonagh Park, Nenagh
	D O'Hanlon 2-1, E Kelly 1-3 (0-2f), P Bourke 0-5 (2f), P Kelly 1-2, B Dunne, S McGrath, T Stapleton, J Carroll 0-1.	Report	S Mullen 0-5 (4f), E Carroll 1-1 (1-0f), R Fallon 0-2 (2f), K Flynn 0-1.	Referee: D Connolly (Kilkenny)

8 April 2007 Quarter-final	Waterford	1-20 - 1-19	Tipperary	Nowlan Park, Kilkenny
	E Kelly 1-9 (6f, 2 '65s), D Shanahan 0-3, J Mullane 0-3, S Prendergast 0-2, J Kennedy 0-2 (1 lineball), S O'Sullivan 0-1.	Report	E Kelly 0-7 (6f, 1 '65'), P Kelly 1-1, L Corbett 0-4, W Ryan 0-3 (1f), R O'Dwyer 0-2, J Carroll, E Corcoran (lineball) 0-1.	Referee: M Haverty (Galway)

== 2007 Munster Senior Hurling Championship ==
10 June 2007 Semi-final	Limerick	1-19 - 1-19	Tipperary	Gaelic Grounds
	A O’Shaughnessy 0-6 (0-4 frees); O Moran 0-5; P Tobin 1-1; B Foley 0-3; N Moran 0-2; M O’Brien 0-2; M Fitzgerald 0-1.	Report	W Ryan 0-7 (0-6 frees); J Carroll 1-1; D Egan 0-3; J Woodlock 0-2; E Kelly 0-2; L Corbett 0-2; R O’Dwyer, S McGrath, 0-1 each.	Attendance: 36,246; Referee: D Kirwan (Cork)

16 June 2007 Semi-final replay	Tipperary	2-21 - 1-24 (AET)	Limerick	Semple Stadium
	E. Kelly 0-9 (0-6 frees); S. Butler 1-3; D. Egan 1-2; L. Corbett 0-3; B. Dunne 0-2; J. Woodlock, E. Corcoran (S/L), 0-1 each.	Report	M. Fitzgerald 1-3; A. O’Shaughnessy 0-6 (0-5 frees 0-1 65); O. Moran 0-5; N. Moran 0-3; K. Tobin 0-2; J. O’Brien 0-2; B. Geary 0-2 (frees); M. Foley 0-1.	Attendance: 27,117; Referee: B Gavin (Offaly)

24 June 2007 Semi-final 2nd replay	Limerick	0-22 - 2-13 (AET)	Tipperary	Gaelic Grounds
	A. O’Shaughnessy 0-6 (0-3 frees 0-1 65); N. Moran 0-5; B. Geary 0-3 (0-1 free 0-1 65); O. Moran 0-3; M. Fitzgerald 0-2; K. Tobin 0-2; D. O’Grady 0-1.	Report	E. Kelly 0-9 (0-7 frees); D. Egan 1-0; W. Ryan 1-0; S. Butler 0-2; S. McGrath, P. Bourke, 0-1 each.	Attendance: 30,608; Referee: S McMahon (Clare)

== 2007 All-Ireland Senior Hurling Championship ==
=== Group 1B ===
Pos	Team	Pld	W	D	L	F	A	Diff	Pts	Qualification
1	Tipperary	3	3	0	0	5-53	4-42	+14	6	Advance to All-Ireland Quarter-Finals
2	Cork	3	2	0	1	5-65	2-42	+32	4	Advance to All-Ireland Quarter-Finals
3	Offaly	3	1	0	2	4-49	5-57	-11	2	
4	Dublin	3	0	0	3	3-39	6-65	-35	0	

30 June Round 1	Tipperary	2-17 - 2-13	Offaly	Semple Stadium
	E Kelly (1-12, 1-10f), L Corbett (1-1), F Devanney (0-2), S Butler (0-2).	Report	D Murray (1-5, 1-4f, 0-1 ‘65'), S Ryan (1-2), G Hanniffy (0-2), P Cleary (0-1f), B Carroll (0-1); J Bergin (0-1), R Hanniffy (0-1).	Attendance: 7,533; Referee: M Haverty (Galway)

7 July Round 2	Dublin	1-11 - 1-20	Tipperary	Parnell Park
	P Carton 1-1, K Dunne 0-3, A McCrabbe 0-2 (0-1f), R O'Carroll, D Qualter, J Kelly, D Curtin (0-1f), S Mullen 0-1 each.	Report	W Ryan 0-10 (0-6), L Corbett 1-1, E Kelly 0-3 (0-1f), S Butler 0-2, B Dunne, F Devanney, D Egan, S McGrath 0-1.	Referee: D Connolly (Kilkenny)

14 July Round 3	Tipperary	2-16 - 1-18	Cork	Semple Stadium
	W Ryan 2-3, L Corbett, B Dunne 0-3 each, S Butler, H Moloney 0-2 each, D Hickey, J Carroll, D Egan 0-1 each.	Report	N Ronan 1-2, J Deane 0-5, J O'Connor 0-3, K Hartnett, K Murphy (Erin's Own), P Cronin 0-2 each, B O'Connor, K Murphy (Sarsfield's) 0-1 each.	Attendance: 12,902; Referee: B Kelly (Westmeath)

=== All-Ireland Series ===
28 July 2007 Quarter-final	Wexford	3-10 - 1-14	Tipperary	Croke Park
	B Lambert (1-2, 1f), R Kehoe (1-0), D Fitzhenry (1-0, 1f), R Jacob, D O'Connor (0-2 each), S Nolan (0-2, 1 '65'), R McCarthy, E Quigley (0-1 each).	Report; Report; Highlights	L Corbett (1-1), D Hickey (0-4), E Kelly (0-3, 2f), B Dunne, H Maloney (0-2 each), J Carroll, S McGrath (0-1 each).	Attendance: 42,364; Referee: J McGrath (Westmeath)

== Awards ==
Tipperary won one All Star Award with Declan Fanning being named at full-back.
