= Paul Shanahan (hurler) =

Irish hurler

Personal information
- Born: County Tipperary, Ireland

Sport
- Sport: Hurling
- Position: Corner-forward
Club
- Years: Club
- Upperchurch–Drombane
Inter-county
- Years: County
- 2018 -: Tipperary

Paul Shanahan is an Irish hurler who plays as a forward for the Tipperary senior team. He plays his club hurling with Upperchurch–Drombane.

== Career ==
Shanahan made his senior debut for the Tipperary hurling team on 3 February 2018 in the second round of the 2018 National Hurling League against Waterford when he came on as a substitute in the first half.
