= Paul Curran (hurler) =

Irish hurler (born 1981)

Personal information
- Native name: Pól Ó Corráin (Irish)
- Born: 11 November 1981 (age 44) Mullinahone, County Tipperary, Ireland
- Occupation: Primary school teacher
- Height: 6 ft 1 in (185 cm)

Sport
- Sport: Hurling
- Position: Full-back
Club
- Years: Club
- Mullinahone
Club titles
- Tipperary titles: 1
College
- Years: College
- Waterford Institute of Technology
College titles
- Fitzgibbon titles: 1
Inter-county*
Years	County	Apps (scores)
2001–2015	Tipperary	43 (0-00)
Inter-county titles
- Munster titles: 5
- All-Irelands: 2
- NHL: 1
- All Stars: 2
- *Inter County team apps and scores correct as of 20:28, 30 April 2015.

Paul Curran (born 11 November 1981) is an Irish hurler who played as a full-back for the Tipperary senior team.

Born in Mullinahone, County Tipperary, Curran first arrived on the inter-county scene at the age of sixteen when he first linked up with the Tipperary minor teams as a dual player before later joining the under-21 hurling side. He joined the senior panel during the 2001 championship. Curran subsequently became a regular member of the starting fifteen and won one All-Ireland medal, four Munster medals and one National Hurling League medal. He was an All-Ireland runner-up on three occasions.

As a member of the Munster inter-provincial team on a number of occasions, Curran won one Railway Cup medal. At club level he is a one-time championship medallist with Mullinahone.

His brothers, Niall and Seán, have also represented Tipperary in both Gaelic football and hurling respectively.

Throughout his career Curran made 43 championship appearances. After being released from the Tipperary senior team he announced his retirement on 30 April 2015.

== Playing career ==
=== University ===
During his studies at the Waterford Institute of Technology, Curran was an automatic inclusion on the college hurling team. After losing the decider in 2002, his side were back the following year and faced Cork Institute of Technology in the final. A 0–13 to 1–7 victory gave Curran a Fitzgibbon Cup medal as captain of the team.

=== Club ===
After winning several divisional championship titles with Mullinahine, the highlight of Curran's club career came in 2002 when the club reached the final of the senior championship for only the second time in their history. Local kingpins Thurles Sarsfields provided the opposition, however, in spite of leading by six points coming into the final quarter, the game ended in a 0–14 apiece draw. The replay was more conclusive. Eoin Kelly scored a remarkable 2–7 as Mullinahone claimed a 2–10 to 1–11 victory. Not only was it Curran's first championship medal but it was also a first title for Mullinahone.

=== Inter-county ===
Curran was just sixteen years-old when he made his minor championship debut for Tipperary as a dual player in 1998. He collected a Munster medal the following year after a 1–13 to 2–7 defeat of Clare.

After failing to make the under-21 team in 2000, Curran spent the following two seasons on the team, however, Limerick dominated the championship at the time.

Curran made his senior debut for Tipperary on 15 April 2001 in a 0–20 to 2–8 defeat of Cork in the group stage of the National Hurling League. He later won a league medal, albeit as a non-playing substitute, following a 1–19 to 0–17 defeat of Clare. Curran was later included on Tipperary's championship panel and collected a set of Munster and All-Ireland medals, once again as a non-playing substitute, following respective defeats of Limerick and Galway.

On 13 July 2002 Curran made his senior championship debut in a 2–19 to 1–9 qualifier defeat of Offaly. He became a regular member of the team in the last line of defence, however, Tipperary endured a disappointing period.

After remaining undefeated during their 2008 league campaign, Tipperary qualified for the decider against Galway. A Lar Corbett goal proved decisive in the 3–18 to 3–16 victory. It was Curran's first league medal on the field. He later collected a first Munster medal on the field of play as Tipperary continued their winning streak with a 2–21 to 0–19 defeat of a resurgent Clare.

Tipperary retained their provincial crown in 2009, with Curran collecting a second Munster medal following a 4–14 to 2–16 defeat of Waterford. On 6 September 2009 Tipperary faced four-in-a-row hopefuls Kilkenny in the All-Ireland decider. For long periods Tipp looked the likely winners, however, late goals from Henry Shefflin and substitute Martin Comerford finally killed off their efforts to secure a 2–22 to 0–23 victory.

Three successive Munster titles proved beyond Tipperary, however, in spite of a shock defeat by Cork in the provincial quarter-final, Tipperary used the qualifiers to good effect and qualified for the All-Ireland decider on 5 September 2010. Kilkenny were the opponents once again as they sought a fifth successive All-Ireland crown title. "The Cats" lost talisman Henry Shefflin early in the game due to injury, while Tipp's Lar Corbett ran riot and scored a hat-trick of goals before Noel McGrath added a fourth. The 4–17 to 1–18 victory gave Curran his first All-Ireland medal on the field of play. He later won a first All-Star.

Tipperary reclaimed the provincial crown in 2011 following a huge 7–19 to 0–19 drubbing of Waterford in the decider. It was Curran's third Munster medal. Tipperary subsequently faced Kilkenny in a third successive All-Ireland decider on 4 September 2011. Goals by Michael Fennelly and Richie Hogan in either half gave Kilkenny, who many viewed as the underdogs going into the game, a 2–17 to 1–16 victory. In spite of this defeat Curran later collected a second successive All-Star.

Curran was appointed captain of the team in 2012 as Tipperary won their fourth Munster crown in five years. The 2–17 to 0–16 defeat of Waterford gave Curran a fourth provincial winners' medal.

Pádraic Maher replaced Curran as Tipperary's first-choice full-back in 2014, with the latter being dropped to the bench. He played no part during the championship campaign which eventually saw Tipperary face an All-Ireland final draw and subsequent defeat by old rivals Kilkenny.

On 30 April 2015, he announced his retirement from inter-county hurling after 15 years.

=== Inter-provincial ===
Curran also had the honour of lining out for Munster in the Inter-provincial Championship on a number of occasions. He secured a winners' medal in this competition in 2005 following a 1–21 to 2–14 defeat of Leinster.

== Coaching ==
In October 2021, he was named as a selector by new Tipperary manager Colm Bonnar for 2022, before departing in July 2022.

== Honours ==
=== Team ===
Mullinahone

- Tipperary Senior Club Hurling Championship (1): 2002

Tipperary

- All-Ireland Senior Hurling Championship (2): 2001, 2010
- Munster Senior Hurling Championship (5): 2001, 2008, 2009, 2011, 2012 (c)
- National Hurling League (1): 2008
- Munster Minor Hurling Championship (1): 1999

Munster

- Railway Cup (1): 2005

=== Individual ===
- All-Stars (2): 2010, 2011

Achievements
Preceded by Eoin Fitzgerald (University of Limerick)	Fitzgibbon Cup Final winning captain 2003	Succeeded by J. J. Delaney (Waterford Institute of Technology)
Sporting positions
Preceded by Eoin Kelly	Tipperary Senior Hurling Captain; 2012	Succeeded by Shane McGrath
