= Tomás Hamill =

Irish hurler

Personal information
- Native name: Tomás Ó hÁdhmaill (Irish)
- Born: 1 May 1994 (age 32) Thurles, Ireland
- Height: 1.85 m (6 ft 1 in)

Sport
- Sport: Hurling
- Position: Right half back
Club
- Years: Club
- 2011-: Moyne–Templetuohy
Inter-county
Years	County	Apps (scores)
2013-	Tipperary	2 (0-0)
Inter-county titles
- Munster titles: 1
- All-Irelands: 1

Tomás Hamill (born 1 May 1994) is an Irish sportsperson. He plays hurling with his local club Moyne–Templetuohy and with the Tipperary senior inter-county team since 2013.

== Career ==
Hamill played Minor Hurling for Tipperary in 2011 and 2012, winning Munster and All Ireland titles in 2012.

He made his league debut for Tipperay in March 2013 against Kilkeny in the 2013 National Hurling League.

Hamill made his championship debut on 14 August 2016 against Galway in the 2016 All-Ireland Senior Hurling Championship semi-final victory, when he came on as a late substitute. On 4 September 2016, Hamill came on as a second-half substitute and won his first All-Ireland Senior hurling title when Tipperary defeated Kilkenny in the final by 2–29 to 2-20. On 5 March 2017, Hamill started at full-back against Clare in the 2017 National Hurling League and went on to claim the man of the match award for his display in a 0–28 to 0–21 win at Semple Stadium.

Hamill made his first championship start for Tipperary on 1 July 2017 in the 2–18 to 0–15 win against Westmeath in round 1 of the All Ireland Qualifiers in Semple Stadium.

In 2020, Hamill suffered an injury and was forced to miss three games.

== Honours ==
=== Tipperary ===
- All-Ireland Senior Hurling Championship:
  - Winner (1): 2016
- Munster Senior Hurling Championship:
  - Winner (1): 2016
- All-Ireland Minor Hurling Championship:
  - Winner (1): 2012
- Munster Minor Hurling Championship:
  - Winner (1): 2012
