= Tommy Heffernan =

Irish hurler

Sport
- Sport: Hurling
- Position: Corner-Forward
Club
- Years: Club
- Nenagh Éire Óg
Inter-county
Years	County	Apps (scores)
2017-	Tipperary	0 (0-0)

Tommy Heffernan is an Irish sportsperson. He plays hurling with his local club Nenagh Éire Óg and with the Tipperary senior inter-county team since 2017.

== Career ==
Heffernan was named in the Tipperary squad for the 2017 National Hurling League and made his league debut on 26 March when he started against Cork.
