= Billy McCarthy =

Irish hurler

Personal information
- Born: County Tipperary, Ireland

Sport
- Sport: Hurling
- Position: Midfield
Club
- Years: Club
- Thurles Sarsfields
Inter-county
- Years: County
- 2018 -: Tipperary

Billy McCarthy is an Irish hurler who plays as a forward for the Tipperary senior team. He plays his club hurling with Thurles Sarsfields.

== Career ==
McCarthy made his senior debut for the Tipperary hurling team on 17 February 2018 in the third round of the 2018 National Hurling League against Wexford when he came on as a substitute in the second half and scored a point. McCarthy made his Championship debut for the Tipperary on 20 May 2018 in the first round of the 2018 Munster Senior Hurling Championship against Limerick in a 1–23 to 2–14 defeat.

In August 2020, McCarthy ruptured his anterior cruciate knee ligament for the third time in as many years during the 2020 Tipperary Senior Hurling Championship.
