= Darragh Mooney =

Irish hurler

Personal information
- Born: 10 March 1992 (age 34) County Tipperary, Ireland

Sport
- Sport: Hurling
- Position: Goalkeeper
Club
- Years: Club
- Éire Óg Annacarty
Club titles
- Tipperary titles: 0
Inter-county*
Years	County	Apps (scores)
2016-present	Tipperary	2 (0-00)
Inter-county titles
- Munster titles: 1
- All-Irelands: 1
- NHL: 0
- All Stars: 0
- *Inter County team apps and scores correct as of 17:39, 24 July 2015.

Darragh Mooney (born 10 March 1992) is an Irish hurler who plays as a goalkeeper for the Tipperary senior team. He plays his club hurling for Éire Óg Annacarty.

== Career ==
Mooney was part of the Tipperary Under-21 hurling panel in 2012 and 2013 and Intermediate hurling panel in 2014 and 2015. He made his competitive debut for Tipperary in the 2016 National Hurling League against Clare on 3 April 2016 where Tipperary lost by 2–13 to 0–18 in Cusack Park in Ennis. He was the substitute goalkeeper as Tipperary went on to win the 2016 Munster and All-Ireland Senior Hurling Championships.

Mooney made his first championship start for Tipperary on 1 July 2017 in the 2–18 to 0–15 win against Westmeath in round 1 of the All Ireland Qualifiers in Semple Stadium.

== Honours ==
=== Player ===
Tipperary

- All-Ireland Senior Hurling Championship (1): 2016 (sub)
- Munster Senior Hurling Championship (1): 2016 (sub)
