= 1998 Tipperary county hurling team season =

Tipperary county hurling team
1998 season
Manager	Len Gaynor
All-Ireland SHC	Didn't qualify
Munster SHC	Semi-Finals
National League	Fourth division 1B
- Top scorer
- Highest SHC attendance
- Lowest SHC attendance
Standard colours

Tipperary competed in the 1998 National Hurling League and the 1998 Munster Championship. It was Len Gaynor's second year in charge of the team with Declan Ryan named as team captain. Finches continued as sponsors of Tipperary GAA.

== Division 1B table ==
Pos	Team	Pld	W	D	L	F	A	Diff	Pts	Notes
1	Cork	5	4	1	0	5-64	6-42	19	9	Division 1 champions
2	Waterford	5	3	1	1	8-64	8-52	12	7	Division 1 runners-up
3	Wexford	5	2	2	1	4-60	2-60	6	6	
4	Tipperary	5	1	1	3	10-52	7-57	4	3	
5	Laois	5	1	1	3	3-54	8-56	-17	3	
6	Kilkenny	5	1	0	4	5-54	5-69	-15	2	

8 March 1998	Tipperary	4-6 - 1-17	Waterford	Semple Stadium, Thurles
	L Cahill 2-0, D Ryan 1-3, M Kennedy 1-0, K Tucker 0-2, R Ryan 0-1.	Report	P Flynn 1-6, K McGrath 0-7, D Shanahan 0-2, G Gater 0-1, B O'Sullivan 0-1.	Referee: P Delaney (Laois)

22 March 1998	Laois	1-13 - 1-13	Tipperary	O'Moore Park, Portlaoise
	D Cuddy 0-6, D Conroy 1-0, D Rooney 0-2, C Cuddy 0-2, O Coss 0-1, N Rigney 0-1, P Cuddy 0-1.		M Kennedy 1-3, E O'Neill 0-4, L Cahill 0-2, J Leahy 0-2, R Ryan 0-1, D O'Connor 0-1.	Referee: S McMahon (Clare)

29 March 1998	Tipperary	3-13 - 1-13	Kilkenny	Semple Stadium, Thurles
	M Kennedy 1-2, E o'Neill 0-5, P Kelly 1-1, D Ryan 1-0, L Cahill 0-3, R Ryan 0-2.		N Moloney 1-6, PJ Delaney 0-2, D Byrne 0-2, A Comerford 0-2, P O'Neill 0-1.	Referee: J Cooney (Galway)

12 April 1998	Cork	2-11 - 2-10	Tipperary	Páirc Uí Rinn, Cork
	J Deane 1-4, A Browne 1-1, B Egan 0-2, F McCormack 0-2, P Ryan 0-2.		P Kelly 1-2, E O'Neill 0-5, M Kennedy 1-0, J Enright 0-1, R Ryan 0-1, D Ryan 0-1.	Referee: A Mac Suibhne (Dublin)

19 April 1998	Wexford	2-13 - 0-10	Tipperary	Enniscorthy
	P Codd 1-7, T Dempsey 1-1, M Jordan 0-1, L Murphy 0-1, D Ruth 0-1, A Fenlon 0-1, R McCarthy 0-1.	Report	E O'Neill 0-6, D Ryan 0-2, P Kelly 0-1, L Cahill 0-1.	Referee: J Cooney (Galway)

== 1998 Munster Senior Hurling Championship ==
7 June
Semi-Final

Waterford	0-21 – 2-12	Tipperary
P. Flynn (0-10), K. McGrath (0-4), T. Browne (0-2), D. Shanahan (0-2), B. O'Sullivan (0-2), A. Kirwan (0-1).	Report	E. O'Neill (1-3), B. O'Meara (1-0), L. Cahill (0-3), T. Dunne (0-2), L. McGrath (0-1), D. Ryan (0-1), J. Leahy (0-1), M. Kennedy (0-1).

Páirc Uí Chaoimh, Cork
Attendance: 30,532
Referee: P. O'Connor (Limerick)
