= Tom Fox (hurler) =

Irish hurler (born 1995)

Personal information
- Native name: Tomás Ó Sionnaigh (Irish)
- Born: 1995 (age 30–31) Annacarty, County Tipperary, Ireland
- Occupation: Sales rep

Sport
- Sport: Hurling
- Position: Midfield
Club
- Years: Club
- Éire Óg Annacarty
Club titles
- Tipperary titles: 0
College
- Years: College
- Waterford Institute of Technology
College titles
- Fitzgibbon titles: 0
Inter-county
- Years: County
- 2017–present: Tipperary
Inter-county titles
- Munster titles: 0
- All-Irelands: 0
- NHL: 0
- All Stars: 0

Thomas Fox (born 1995) is an Irish hurler who plays for Tipperary Senior Championship club Éire Óg Annacarty and at inter-county level with the Tipperary senior hurling team. He usually lines out as a midfielder. Fox is the nephew of former Tipperary hurler Pat Fox.

== Honours ==
Tipperary

- All-Ireland Minor Hurling Championship (1): 2012
- Munster Minor Hurling Championship (1): 2012
