= Declan Fanning =

Irish hurler and Gaelic footballer

Personal information
- Native name: Déaglán Ó Fainín (Irish)
- Born: 24 June 1979 (age 47) Killenaule, County Tipperary, Ireland
- Occupation: Agricultural Mechanic
- Height: 6 ft 2 in (188 cm)

Sport
- Sport: Dual player
- Position: Right wing-back
Club
- Years: Club
- Killenaule
Club titles
	Football	Hurling
Tipperary titles	0	0
Inter-county*
Years	County	Apps (scores)
2003 2004–2010	Tipperary (football); Tipperary (hurling)	4 (0-00); 30 (0–1)
Inter-county titles
- Munster titles: 2
- All-Irelands: 1
- NHL: 1
- All Stars: 1
- *Inter County team apps and scores correct as of 23:31, 29 October 2014.

Declan Fanning (born 24 June 1979) is an Irish Gaelic footballer and hurler who played as right wing-back for the Tipperary senior team.

Born in Killenaule, County Tipperary, Fanning first arrived on the inter-county scene at the age of seventeen when he first linked up with the Tipperary minor teams as a dual player, before later joining the under-21 sides. He made his senior football debut during the 2003 championship before making his hurling debut during the 2004 championship. Fanning went on to play a key part for Tipperary, and won one All-Ireland medal, two Munster medals and one National Hurling League medal. He was an All-Ireland runner-up on one occasion.

As a member of the Munster inter-provincial team on a number of occasions, Fanning won one Railway Cup medal. At club level he has won several divisional championship medals with Killenaule.

Throughout his career Fanning made a combined total of 34 championship appearances for Tipperary. He announced his retirement from inter-county hurling on 1 November 2010.

In retirement from playing Fanning became involved in team management and coaching. In October 2014 he joined the Tipperary senior management team as a selector.

== Playing career ==
=== Club ===
Fanning plays his club hurling with his local Killenaule side, however, he has yet to win a senior county title.

=== Inter-county ===
Fanning first came to prominence on the inter-county scene as a member of the Tipperary minor hurling team in the late 1990s. He won a Munster title in this grade in 1997, however, Tipp were defeated in the later stages of the All-Ireland championship. Fanning later joined the Tipperary under-21 side, however, he had little success at this level. In 2003 Fanning was a dual player with his native county. That year he lined out with the Tipperary senior footballers in their qualifier game against Donegal. Fanning made his competitive senior hurling debut as a substitute in a National Hurling League game against Wexford in 2004. He made his championship debut against Limerick later that same year, however, Tipp's championship hopes ended in defeat. In 2005 Fanning lined out in his first Munster final, however, provincial rivals Cork were victorious on that occasion. Tipp were later defeated in the All-Ireland quarter-final. In 2006 Fanning's side took on Cork in the Munster final yet again, however, Cork won the game once again. Tipp were later defeated in the All-Ireland quarter-final once again. Tipp began their 2007 championship campaign with an epic series of three games against Limerick. Fanning's side lost the second replay, however, Tipp later came through the qualifiers only to be defeated in a third consecutive All-Ireland quarter-final. In spite of a lack of championship success Fanning was presented with his first All-Star award.

In September 2009, Fanning was nominated for the 2009 All Star Team.

On 5 September 2010, Fanning started at right half-back as Tipperary won their 26th All Ireland title, beating reigning champions Killkenny by 4–17 to 1–18 in the final, preventing Kilkenny from achieving an historic 5-in-a-row, it was Fanning's first All-Ireland winners medal.

On 1 November 2010, Fanning announced his retirement from inter-county hurling. 'Having had the great honour of winning an All Ireland senior hurling medal with Tipperary this year, I have decided to call time on my inter-county hurling career, I am very grateful to Liam Sheedy and his management and backroom team for all the encouragement and support they gave me. I want to thank all the players, We worked hard together but we also had great fun and I shall miss training and hurling with them.' he said in a statement.

=== Inter-provincial ===
Fanning has also lined out with Munster in the Railway Cup inter-provincial competition. He captured a winners medal in this competition in 2007 as Munster defeated Connacht in the final.

== Coaching ==
In October 2014, it was confirmed that Fanning will be a selector on the Tipperary hurling team in 2015. In November 2015, Fanning was named as a coach for the Tipperary senior hurling team under new manager Michael Ryan. On 4 September 2016, Tipperary defeated Kilkenny in the final by 2-29 to 2-20.

== Honours ==
=== Team ===
Killenaule

- South Tipperary Senior Hurling Championship (5): 2005, 2007, 2008, 2013 (c), 2015

Tipperary

- All-Ireland Senior Hurling Championship (1): 2010
- Munster Senior Hurling Championship (2): 2008, 2009
- National Hurling League (1): 2008
- McGrath Cup (1): 2003
- Munster Minor Hurling Championship (1): 1997

Railway Cup

- Railway Cup (1): 2007

=== Individual ===
Awards

- All-Star (1): 2007
