= 2016 Tipperary county hurling team season =

Tipperary county hurling team
2016 season
Manager	Michael Ryan
Captain	Brendan Maher
All-Ireland SHC	Winners
Munster SHC	Winners
National League	Quarter-finalists
Top scorer Championship	Séamus Callanan (2-47)
Highest SHC attendance	82,016 (v Kilkenny 4 September)
Lowest SHC attendance	25,531 (v Limerick 19 June)

The 2016 season was Michael Ryan's first year as manager of the Tipperary senior hurling team.

In October 2014, it had been confirmed that assistant manager Michael Ryan would succeed Eamon O'Shea as the Tipperary manager after the conclusion of the 2015 season. In November 2015, it was confirmed that Ryan would be assisted by former Tipperary player's John Madden as a selector and Declan Fanning as a coach in 2016. 1995 All-Ireland Under-21 Hurling Championship winning captain Brian Horgan was added to the backroom team on 20 November. In January, Conor Stakelum was also added to the management team as a selector. Denis Leamy was also added to the back-room team in July.

Brendan Maher was confirmed as captain for 2016 in December 2015 with Pádraic Maher retaining the role of vice-captain.

Intersport/Elverys continued as sponsors of Tipperary GAA for the second year. The Tipperary jersey for the 2016 season was the same as was used in 2015 and displayed the Intersport brand name on the front and their co-sponsor Elvery's name on the back.

Tipperary chose not to compete in the new Munster Senior Hurling League which began on 3 January and instead choose to arrange challenge games before the start of the National League in February. Tipperary began their season at the JK Brackens pitch in Templemore on 10 January where they defeated Offaly in a challenge match.

Tipperary went on to win their 27th All-Ireland title and first time since 2010, defeating Kilkenny in the final, 2–29 to 2–20.

== 2016 senior hurling management team ==
Name	Position	Club
Michael Ryan	Manager	Upperchurch-Drombane
Declan Fanning	Coach	Killenaule
John Madden	Selector	Lorrha-Dorrha
Brian Horgan	Selector	Knockavilla-Donaskeigh Kickhams
Conor Stakelum	Selector	Borris-Ileigh

=== 2016 squad ===
The following players made their competitive senior debut in 2016.

- Daire Quinn against Dublin on 13 February.
- Dan McCormack against Dublin on 13 February.
- Dylan Fitzell against Dublin on 13 February.
- Joe Gallagher against Dublin on 13 February.
- John Meagher against Dublin on 13 February.
- Andrew Coffey against Kilkenny 21 February.
- Barry Heffernan against Waterford on 6 March.
- Kieran Morris against Cork on 20 March.
- Willie Ryan against Cork on 20 March.
- Darragh Mooney against Clare on 3 April.
- Steven O'Brien against Clare on 3 April.
- Séamus Kennedy against Cork on 22 May.
- Aidan McCormack against Waterford on 10 July.

A panel of 26 players for the opening National Hurling League game against Dublin in Semple Stadium on 13 February was announced on 11 February and will be reviewed before each Hurling League game. Ahead of that announcement, the county confirmed on 10 February that "Seamus [sic] Callanan will be out for a further couple of weeks, Conor O’Brien will be out for 3 weeks, Kieran Bergin will also be out for 2 weeks while new panelist Sean Curran has suffered a medial ligament injury which will result in Sean missing the entire League."

The first panel announced for the Dublin game was as follows, Darren Gleeson, Cathal Barrett, Tomás Hamill, Michael Cahill, Brendan Maher, James Barry, Padraic Maher, Michael Breen, Daire Quinn, Dan McCormack, Patrick Maher, Jason Forde, Noel McGrath, Conor Kenny, John McGrath, Darragh Mooney, Ronan Maher, Willie Ryan, Liam Ryan, John Meagher, Joe Gallagher, Adrian Ryan, Dylan Fitzelle, Sean Ryan, Andrew Coffey, and John O’Dwyer.

No.	Player	Position	Club
1	Darren Gleeson	Goalkeeper	Portroe
2	Cathal Barrett	Right corner back	Holycross-Ballycahill
4	Joe O'Dwyer	Left corner back	Killenaule
5	Kieran Bergin	Right half back	Killenaule
7	Pádraic Maher	Left half back	Thurles Sarsfields
9	Brendan Maher	Midfield	Borris-Ileigh
10	Denis Maher	Right half Forward	Thurles Sarsfields
11	Patrick Maher	Centre forward	Lorrha-Dorrha
13	John O'Dwyer	Right corner forward	Killenaule
14	Séamus Callanan	Full forward	Drom-Inch
15	Jason Forde	Left corner forward	Silvermines

No.	Player	Position	Club
16	Darragh Egan	Substitute	Kildangan
17	Shane Bourke	Substitute	J.K. Bracken's
18	Michael Cahill	Substitute	Thurles Sarsfields
19	Paddy Stapleton	Substitute	Borris-Ileigh
20	James Barry	Substitute	Upperchurch-Drombane
21	Niall O'Meara	Substitute	Kilruane MacDonagh's
22	Noel McGrath	Substitute	Loughmore-Castleiney
23	Ronan Maher	Substitute	Thurles Sarsfields
24	Conor O'Brien	Substitute	Éire Óg Annacarty
25	Gearóid Ryan	Substitute	Templederry Kenyons
26	Thomas Stapleton	Substitute	Templederry Kenyons

== Challenge Games ==
On 11 January, Tipperary defeated Offaly by 2–17 to 1–15 in a Senior Hurling Challenge game played in Templemore, their first match of the year. Tipperary won the game on a 2–17 to 1-15 scoreline. On 17 January, Tipperary played a Thurles CBS All Star selection in Drom-Inch to mark 200 years of Thurles CBS.

10 January

Tipperary	2–17 – 1–15	Offaly
Adrian Ryan 1-2, Conor Kenny 0-5 (1f), Patrick Maher 1-1, Sean Curran 0-4 (2f, 2 65s), Bill Maher, Dan McCormack, Daire Quinn, Jason Forde & Kieran Morris (f) 0-1 each.	Report Darren Gleeson; Joe O’Dwyer, Michael Breen, Conor O’Brien; Willie Ryan, John Meagher, Pádraic Maher; Joe Gallagher, Bill Maher; Dan McCormack, Patrick Maher, Sean Curran; Liam McGrath, Conor Kenny, Adrian Ryan; Dylan Fitzell for Gallagher (30), Jason Forde for Patrick Maher (h.t), Michael Cahill for Breen (h.t.), Daire Quinn for Bill Maher (h.t.), Kieran Morris for McGrath (h.t), Darragh Mooney for Gleeson (h.t.), Liam Ryan for Willie Ryan (40), John O’Dwyer for McCormack (43), Bill Maher for Morris (61).	James Mulrooney 1-7 (0-4f, 0-1 65, 0-1 sl), Paddy Murphy 0-3, Sean Ryan, Shane Kinsella, Colin Egan, Stephen Quirke & James Gorman 0-1 each.

Templemore
Referee: Anthony Stapleton (Laois)
17 January
14:00

Tipperary	0-14 - 1-7	Thurles CBS Allstars

Drom-Inch
24 January
14:00

Tipperary	7–29 – 0–6	Mary Immaculate College
John McGrath 1-7 (0-4f), Conor Kenny 2-2, Patrick Maher 2-1, Kieran Morris 1-3, Noel McGrath 1-1, Dylan Fitzell, Liam McGrath & Andrew Coffey 0-3 each, Jason Forde 0-2, Brendan Maher, Michael Breen, Dan McCormack, Daire Quinn 0-1 each.	Report Brian Hogan; Joe O’Dwyer, Thomas Hamill, Michael Cahill; Daire Quinn, Barry Heffernan, Brendan Maher, Michael Breen, Dylan Fitzell; Andrew Coffey, Patrick Maher, Kieran Morris; John McGrath, Conor Kenny, Liam McGrath; Subs: Conor O’Brien for O’Dwyer, Dan McCormack for L McGrath, Jason Forde for Coffey, Noel McGrath for Kenny (all half-time), Bill Maher B Maher (56) Cathal Barrett for Quinn (56)Subs:	Conor Twomey 0-4 (2f), Eoin Quirke (f) & Alan Flynn 0-1 each.

Boherlahan
Referee: Philip Kelly (Ballinahinch)
31 January

Tipperary	1-31 – 0–17	Laois
Dan McCormack (0-1), Kieran Morris (0-2 frees), Conor Kenny (0-1), John O’Dwyer (0-3 frees), Brendan Maher (0-5, 0-4 frees), Daire Quinn (0-1), Dylan Fitzelle (0-3), Andrew Coffey (0-3), Jason Forde (0-3), Liam McGrath (0-6, 0-2 frees), John McGrath (1-3)	Report Darren Gleeson; Joe O’Dwyer, Tossie Hamill, Michael Cahill; Willie Ryan, Barry Heffernan, Liam Ryan; Noel McGrath, Michael Breen; Dan McCormack (0-1), Patrick Maher, Sean Ryan; Kieran Morris (0-2 frees), Conor Kenny (0-1), John O’Dwyer (0-3 frees) Subs: Darragh Mooney, Cathal Barrett, James Barry, Conor O’Brien, Brendan Maher (0-5, 0-4 frees), Joe Gallagher, Padraic Maher, Daire Quinn (0-1), Dylan Fitzelle (0-3), Andrew Coffey (0-3), Jason Forde (0-3), Sean Curran, Liam McGrath (0-6, 0-2 frees), John McGrath (1-3), Brian Hogan

Dr. Morris Park Thurles

== National Hurling League ==
=== Summary ===
Tipperary started their league campaign on 13 February against Dublin at Semple Stadium. Tipperary won the game by 14 points in Michael Ryan's first competitive game in charge of the team. Jason Forde scored a goal 13th-minute goal, breaking onto loose ball before firing a low strike past the goalkeeper as Tipperary had a 1–09 to 0–03 lead at half-time in freezing conditions, despite registering 10 wides in the first half. The game was shown live on Setanta Sports. Daire Quinn and Dan McCormack made their competitive debuts in the game.

Tipperary played Kilkenny on 21 February at Nowlan Park, in a game which was shown live on TG4. The starting XV was unchanged from the opening game against Dublin. Two late goals from forward Kevin Kelly in the 67th and 72nd minutes handed Kilkenny a five-point victory in the game. Tipperary never trained in the game until three minutes from time when Kelly got his first goal to put Kilkenny into a 1–15 to 0–16 lead. Tipperary have only beaten Kilkenny twice now in 11 games now since the 2010 All-Ireland final victory.

Two weeks later on 6 March, Tipperary played Waterford at Semple Stadium, in a game which was shown deferred on TG4. There was three changes to his side Séamus Callanan returning, while Barry Heffernan from Nenagh Éire Óg made his league debut at right half back and Ronan Maher marking his first full start of the campaign at centre back. Seamus Callanan was a late withdrawal from the team with a hamstring strain. Austin Gleeson scored an injury-time free for Waterford as they won the game by one point, condemning Tipperary to a second late loss in as many games. Tipperary looked to have snatched a win in the 68th minute when John McGrath scored with a low shot to the far corner of the net, but late frees from Curran and Gleeson sealed a one-point victory for Waterford.

On 13 March, Tipperary traveled to Pearse Stadium in Galway in round 4 of the league. The match was shown live on TG4. There were three changes to the side that lined out the previous week against Waterford, with Kieran Bergin and Adrian Ryan getting their first starts in the 2016 league, with Bergin lining out at centre forward having returned to action as a substitute last week and Ryan starting at right corner forward. The other change saw Niall O’Meara starting at top of the left. Joe Canning scored with a late sideline cut before John O’Dwyer levelled the game for Tipperary with the final puck of the game. The game finished 1–22 to Tipperary and 2–19 to Galway, Tipperary had a 1–10 to 1–09 lead at half-time.

Relegation worries were still there for Tipperary after this game but a quarter-final was confirmed after beating Cork by 2–27 to 2–15 in the final divisional game on 20 March at Semple Stadium. Tipperary had a 13-point superior scoring difference to Galway going into the final day. The match was shown deferred on TG4 and Tipperary had a 0–13 to 0–10 at lead at half-time. Niall O'Meara scored the game's opening goal with 20 minutes, shooting low to the net with Michael Breen getting the second when he hammered it to the net from the right. Seamus Callanan returned for his first league game of the year when he came on as a half-time substitute, and went on to score two points. The squad will have a training camp at Breaffy House on Easter weekend. Following the training camp over Easter, six players were cut from the panel, Conor Kenny, Joe O’Dwyer, Kieran Morris, Joe Gallagher, Bill Maher and Sean Ryan.

Tipperary went on to play Clare in the Quarter-Final's on Sunday 3 April at 3:45pm in Cusack Park in Ennis. A coin toss saw Clare get the home advantage for this game. The game was shown live on TG4 and Clare won it on a 2–13 to 0–18 scoreline. A 67th-minute goal by substitute Aaron Shanagher sealed a Semi-final date with Kilkenny for Clare. Tipperary had a three-point lead in the 62nd minute but found themselves behind five minutes later when Shanagher got his goal. Clare had a half-time lead of 1–7 to 0–8. The defeat to Clare was the seventh time in five years that they lost a game by a point. It was also their second one-point defeat in 2016.

13 February
19:00
Round 1

Tipperary	1–23 – 0–12	Dublin
J Forde (1-5), J McGrath (0-7, 5f), C Kenny (0-3), J O’Dwyer (0-3), Padraic Maher (0-2), N McGrath (0-2), D Fitzelle (0-1).	Report D Gleeson; C Barrett, T Hamill, M Cahill; B Maher, J Barry, Pádraic Maher; M Breen, D Quinn; D McCormack, Patrick Maher, J Forde; N McGrath, C Kenny, J McGrath Subs: D Fitzelle for Patrick Maher (47), J Gallagher for Breen (58), J O’Dwyer for McCormack (58), J Meagher for B Maher (66), L Ryan for Quinn (67).	D Treacy (0-3f), N McMorrow (0-2), D Plunkett (0-1), E Dillon (0-1), D O’Callaghan (0-1), P Ryan (0-1f), M Schutte (0-1), C Cronin (0-1), D O’Connell (0-1).

Semple Stadium
Attendance: 5,105
Referee: C Lyons (Cork)
21 February
14:00
Round 2

Tipperary	0–18 – 2–17	Kilkenny
J O’Dwyer 0-9 (3f, 2 65s), J McGrath 0-4 (1f), C Kenny 0-2, N McGrath 0-2, M Breen 0-1.	Report D Gleeson; C Barrett, T Hamill, M Cahill; B Maher, J Barry, Pádraic Maher; M Breen, D Quinn; D McCormack, Patrick Maher, J O’Dwyer; N McGrath, C Kenny, J McGrath Subs: N O’Meara for Kenny (50), R Maher for Quinn (52), J Meagher for Pádraic Maher (68), A Coffey for McCormack (68).	TJ Reid 0-10 (6f, 1 65), K Kelly 2-1, J Maher 0-4, P Walsh 01, W Walsh 0-1

Nowlan Park
Attendance: 10,892
Referee: C McAllister (Cork)
6 March
15:00
Round 3

Tipperary	1–17 – 1–18	Waterford
J O’Dwyer 0-11 (9f), J McGrath 1-2, M Breen 0-2, N McGrath, B Maher 0-1 each.	Report D Gleeson; C Barrett, T Hamill, M Cahill; B Heffernan, R Maher, Padraic Maher; B Maher, M Breen; N McGrath, D McCormack, Patrick Maher; J O’Dwyer, L McGrath, J McGrath. Subs: N O’Meara for L McGrath (50), K Bergin for McCormack (58)	P Curran 0-9 (7f), T Devine 1-0, S Bennett 0-3, K Moran, A Gleeson 0-2 (1f) each, M Kearney, J Barron 0-1 each.

Semple Stadium
Attendance: 6,540
Referee: C Lyons (Cork)
13 March
14:00
Round 4

Galway	2–19 – 1–22	Tipperary
J Canning 1-11 (8f, 1 sl), N Burke 0-4, J Flynn 0-3, I Tannian 1-0, D Glennon 0-1	Report D Gleeson; C Barrett, T Hamill, M Cahill; B Heffernan, R Maher, P Maher; M Breen, B Maher; N McGrath, K Bergin, D McCormack; J McGrath, A Ryan, N O'Meara; Subs: C O'Brien for Cahill (24), C Kenny for Bergin (h-t), J O'Dwyer (0-2) for McCormack (h-t), D Quinn (0-1) for Kenny (58).	J McGrath 0-6 (4f), N O’Meara 1-0, M Breen 0-3, N McGrath 0-3, B Maher 0-2, A Ryan 0-2, J O’Dwyer 0-2, C Barrett 0-1, B Heffernan 0-1, D Quinn 0-1, Padraic Maher 0-1

Pearse Stadium
Attendance: 6,619
Referee: James Owens (Wexford)
20 March
14:00
Round 5

Tipperary	2–27 – 2–15	Cork
J O'Dwyer 0-10 (9fs), M Breen 1-4, J McGrath 0-5, N O'Meara 1-1, N McGrath, S Callanan, D McCormack 0-2 each, B Maher 0-1	Report D Gleeson; C Barrett, J Barry, C O'Brien; B Heffernan, R Maher, P Maher; B Maher, M Breen; J O'Dwyer, N O'Meara, N McGrath; K Morris, J McGrath, A Ryan; Subs: D McCormack for Ryan (h.t.), S Callanan for Morris (h-t), W Ryan for Heffernan (52), A Coffey for N McGrath (59), T Hamill for Barry (66).	P Horgan 1-8 (0-6fs), P O'Sullivan 1-0, C Lehane 0-3, P Haughney, B Lawton, B Cooper, L O'Farrell 0-1 each.

Semple Stadium
Attendance: 7,251
Referee: P O'Dwyer (Carlow)
3 April
15:45
Quarter-Final

Tipperary	0–18 – 2–13	Clare
J McGrath 0-6, J O'Dwyer 0-3 (3f), S Callanan (2f), M Breen, P Maher 0-2 each, J Forde, R Maher, N McGrath 0-1 each.	Report D Mooney; C Barrett, J Barry, C O'Brien; B Heffernan, R Maher, P Maher; B Maher, M Breen; N McGrath, D McCormack, N O'Meara; J O'Dwyer, S Callanan, J McGrath; Subs: K Bergin for O'Meara (ht), J Forde for Callanan (51), T Hamill for O'Brien (58), G Ryan for McCormack (66), S O'Brien for O'Dwyer (71)	J Conlon 1-1, A Shanagher 1-0, B Duggan (2f), D Honan 0-3 each, C Galvin, C McGrath, C O'Connell (2f) 0-2 each.

Cusack Park
Attendance: 9,028
Referee: D Kirwan (Cork)

== 2016 Munster Senior Hurling Championship ==
=== Munster Quarter-final ===
Tipperary were drawn to take on Cork on 22 May at Semple Stadium in the Munster Quarter-final. The winners of the game would play Limerick in the Munster Semi-final on 19 June.

The match was shown live on RTÉ One as part of the Sunday Game live, presented by Michael Lyster with analysis by Ger Loughnane and Henry Shefflin. Commentary on the game was provided by Ger Canning alongside Michael Duignan.

Four players were picked to make their Championship debuts in the game, Séamus Kennedy at half-back, Sean Curran, Dan McCormack, and John McGrath. In very rainy conditions, Tipperary had a nine-point lead at half-time and went on to win the game by nine points, they also went 17 minutes without scoring in the second half. Hawk-Eye was used for the first time at Semple Stadium, and judged three efforts wide during the game. Watched by a 29,114 crowd, Tipperary had too much for a disappointing Cork at a rain-drenched Semple Stadium. Tipperary playing against Cork's sweeper William Egan choose to split balls to the sidelines for their full-forward to chase with Cork short of support in the forwards. Pádraic Maher was named by RTE as the man of the match.

22 May
16:00
Munster Quarter-Final

Tipperary	0–22 – 0–13	Cork
S Callanan 0-8 (4f), J O'Dwyer 0-7 (2f, 1'65'), N McGrath 0-2, Padraic Maher, B Maher, J McGrath, J Forde, K Bergin 0-1 each.	Report Gleeson; C Barrett, J Barry, M Cahill; S Kennedy, R Maher, Padraic Maher; B Maher, M Breen; S Curran, D McCormack, N McGrath; J O'Dwyer, S Callanan, J McGrath; Subs: J Forde for N McGrath (52), Patrick Maher for Curran (55), N O'Meara for O'Dwyer (64), K Bergin for Breen (64).	P Horgan 0-4 (4f), A Cadogan 0-3, C Lehane 0-2 (1f), B Lawton, C Murphy, S Harnedy, L O'Farrell 0-1 each.

Semple Stadium
Attendance: 29,114
Referee: B Kelly (Westmeath)

=== Munster Semi-final ===
Tipperary went on to play Limerick in the Munster Semi-final on 19 June at Semple Stadium. The counties had met 67 times in the championship, 65 in Munster, once in the All-Ireland semi-final in 2009 and once in the All-Ireland qualifiers in 2004, with Tipperary having 34 wins, Limerick 23 wins and 10 draws. The winners would play Waterford in the Munster final on 10 July. It was the fifth year in a row that Tipperary and Limerick would play each other in the Munster hurling championship.

Tipperary made one change to the starting team with Patrick Maher returning in place of Seán Curran. The match was shown live on RTÉ One as part of the Sunday Game live, presented by Michael Lyster with analysis by Ger Loughnane and Henry Shefflin. Commentary on the game was provided by Ger Canning alongside Dónal O'Grady. In rainy and wet conditions, Tipperary had a three-point lead at half-time (3-5 to 0–11) and went on to win the game by two points. John 'Bubbles' O'Dwyer was shown a straight red card in the fourteenth minute for striking the hurl at Richie English. By that time Tipperary had already scored two goals, both coming from Michael Breen, the first after he followed up on his initial run and pass, striking the ball low one handed to the net, the second when he reacted quickly flicking the ball into the net after he followed up on a shot which was saved from Séamus Callanan by the goalkeeper. The third goal for Tipperary came when Séamus Callanan hit the ball low to the left of the net after a hand-pass from Noel McGrath on the left. Tom Morrissey got a late goal for Limerick when he smashed the ball past Darren Gleeson to bring the gap down to two points at the end.

Cathal Barrett was announced as the man-of-the-match on the Sunday Game that evening, the other nominees were Noel McGrath and Limerick forward Cian Lynch.

19 June
16:00
Munster Semi-Final

Tipperary	3-12 - 1-16	Limerick
S Callanan 1-6 (3fs, 2 '65), N McGrath 0-3, M Breen 2-1, J McGrath 0-1, P Maher 0-1.	Report D Gleeson; C Barrett, J Barry, M Cahill; S Kennedy, R Maher, Pádraic Maher; B Maher (c), M Breen; N McGrath, Patrick Maher, D McCormack; J O’Dwyer, S Callanan, J McGrath; Subs: N O’Meara for D McCormack (60), D Maher for R Maher (inj 64), J Forde for Patrick Maher (69), K Bergin for B Maher, D Quinn for M Breen (both 70+1); Sent off: J. O’Dwyer (straight, 14).	S Dowling 0-9 (8fs), T Morrissey 1-0, D Hannon 0-2, B Nash, J Ryan, G Hegarty, C Lynch and J Fitzgibbon 0-1 each

Semple Stadium
Attendance: 25,531
Referee: James McGrath (Westmeath)

=== Munster Final ===
Tipperary went on to play Waterford in the Munster Final on 10 July at the Gaelic Grounds. Tipperary went into the match without the suspended John O'Dwyer who received a one match ban for his sending off in the Limerick match. This was the 11th Munster final meeting between the counties with Tipperary leading 8–2. The winners would qualify for the All-Ireland semi-final on 14 August, while the losers meet a qualifier winner in the All-Ireland quarter-final on 24 July. Tipperary named their team on Friday 8 July, the only change being Niall O'Meara joining the full-forward line in place of John 'Bubbles' O'Dwyer. The match was shown live on RTÉ One as part of the Sunday Game live, presented by Michael Lyster with analysis by Ger Loughnane and Henry Shefflin. Commentary on the game was provided by Ger Canning alongside Michael Duignan. On a wet and windy day in Limerick, Tipperary retained their Munster title beating Waterford by 5–19 to 0–13, which was a second 21-point Munster final winning margin over Waterford in the space of five years. Tipperary had a 1–7 to 0–8 lead at half time, the opening goal coming from John McGrath in the 9th minute after a mistake by Waterford goalkeeper Stephen O’Keeffe who miss-controlled with McGrath firing into the net. Tipperary hit three goals in the space of eight second half minutes with McGrath getting his second goal in the 41st minute when he kicked to the net after a high ball into the full forward line. Michael Breen got the third three minutes later with a low strike to the right of the goalkeeper after a pass from John McGrath. The fourth came from a penalty after Seamus Callanan was fouled by Barry Coughlan. McGrath fired to the right of the goalkeeper who managed to get his hurley to the ball but only diverted into the top corner of the net. The fifth goal was scored by Seamus Callanan with another low shot to the right of the goalkeeper. Aidan McCormack came on as a substitute in the 66th minute to make his championship debut.

John McGrath who scored 3-2 was named as the man of the match by Sunday Game pundits Eddie Brennan and Cyril Farrell, Seamus Callanan and Cathal Barrett were also nominated.

10 July
16:00
Munster Final

Tipperary	5-19 - 0-13	Waterford
S. Callanan (1-11, 8 frees, 1 65); J. McGrath (3-2, 1-0 pen); M. Breen (1-1); Pádraic Maher, N. McGrath, Patrick Maher, J. Forde, A. McCormack (0-1 each)	Report D. Gleeson; C. Barrett, J. Barry, M. Cahill; S. Kennedy, R. Maher, Pádraic Maher; B. Maher (c), M. Breen; D. McCormack, Patrick Maher, N. McGrath; J. McGrath, S. Callanan, N. O’Meara. Subs:J. Forde for N. O’Meara (51), S. Curran for D. McCormack (56), K. Bergin for B. Maher (61), A. McCormack for N. McGrath (66), D. Maher for R. Maher (67).	Pauric Mahony (0-6, 4 frees); P. Curran (0-5, 3 frees); A. Gleeson (0-2, sidelines)

Gaelic Grounds
Attendance: 26,508
Referee: Brian Gavin (Offaly)

== 2016 All-Ireland Senior Hurling Championship ==
=== 2016 All Ireland Semi-final ===
By winning the Munster championship, Tipperary qualified for the semi-finals of the All-Ireland championship on 14 August at Croke Park. Tipperary found out there opponents in the semi-final on 24 July after Galway defeated Clare in the quarter-final by 2–17 to 0–17 at Semple Stadium in Thurles. This was the third year in a row that Tipperary would meet Galway in the Championship. Tickets for the match ranged in price from €40 for the stands to €25 for Hill 16. The match was shown live on RTÉ2 with commentary on the game provided by Ger Canning alongside Michael Duignan. The game was also shown live on Sky Sports. Michael Lyster presented from the Croke Park studio with analysts Cyril Farrell, Henry Shefflin, and Liam Sheedy. Tipperary were 1/2 favourites to reach the final. The Tipperary team announced on 12 August showed no changes from the Munster Final with John O’Dwyer named on the bench after returning from suspension.

Tipperary won the game by a point on a 2–19 to 2-18 scoreline to qualify for the final on 4 September against Kilkenny. Galway opened the scoring in the game with a point from Joe Canning and then Conor Cooney scored a goal beating Darren Gleeson from the 21-yard line with a low shot after nine minutes to put Galway into a 1–3 to 0–4 lead. Noel McGrath crashed a shot off the bar in the 10th minute for Tipperary who were playing into the hill 16 end in the first half. Galway had a 1–10 to 0-11 point lead at half time. Galway lost Joe Canning through injury at half-time while defender Adrian Tuohy was also withdrawn due to injury. In the 43rd minute Conor Cooney got a second goal for Galway when he cut in from the left and hit a low shot to the corner of the net after he had intercepted a Brendan Maher hand-pass, this put Galway into a three-point lead. John O'Dwyer was introduced a minute later for Tipperary replacing Niall O’Meara. Tipperary trailed by 2–15 to 0–19 with ten minutes to go. O'Dwyer scored a goal in the 62nd minute when he cut in from the right and finished from a very tight angle to far corner of the net, hitting the ball off the ground first past the goalkeeper after a pass from John McGrath. Tipperary got a second goal two minutes later when Seamus Callanan hand-passed from the left to John McGrath who collided first with the goalkeeper before firing to the net to put Tipperary into a three-point lead. Galway reduced the lead to one point but Tipperary held on to reach the final.

David Burke of Galway was named as the man of the match by Sunday Game panellists Ger Loughnane and Tomas Mulcahy, beating James Barry and Padraic Maher who were also nominated. Tipperary were the first Munster champions since their own 2011 team to win an All-Ireland semi-final.

Nicky English writing in the Irish Times thought that Tipperary this year are mentally stronger and physically more powerful.

14 August
15:30
All Ireland Semi-Final

Tipperary	2-19 - 2-18	Galway
Seamus Callanan 0-9 (0-8f, 0-1 ’65), John McGrath 1-1, John O’Dwyer 1-0, Noel McGrath, Michael Breen 0-3 each, Ronan Maher, Padraic Maher, Brendan Maher 0-1 each.	Report D. Gleeson; C. Barrett, J. Barry, M. Cahill; S. Kennedy, R. Maher, Pádraic Maher; B. Maher (c), M. Breen; D. McCormack, Patrick Maher, N. McGrath; J. McGrath, S. Callanan, N. O’Meara. Subs:J O'Dwyer for O'Meara (45), J Forde for N McGrath (57), S Curran for Breen (68), T Hamill for Kennedy (71).	Conor Cooney 1-6 (0-4f), Joe Canning 0-5 (0-3f, 0-1 ’65), Joseph Cooney 1-1, Conor Whelan, Jason Flynn 0-2 each, Shane Maloney, David Burke 0-1 each.

Croke Park
Attendance: 54,227
Referee: B Kelly (Westmeath)

=== 2016 All Ireland Final ===
==== Build-up ====
Tipperary went on to play Kilkenny in the 2016 All-Ireland Senior Hurling Championship Final after Kilkenny defeated Waterford by 2–19 to 2–17 in a replay on 13 August at Semple Stadium.

Tickets for the match ranged in price from €40 for the terrace to €70 for stands and the match was a sell-out. The match was shown live on RTÉ2 with commentary on the game provided by Ger Canning alongside Michael Duignan. The game was also shown live on Sky Sports, presented by Rachel Wyse and Brian Carney. Michael Lyster presented from the Croke Park studio with analysts Ger Loughnane, Henry Shefflin, and Liam Sheedy.

This was the seventh time in eight years that the counties had played each other in the championship, with Kilkenny winning 5 times. Kilkenny go into the final having won 36 All Ireland titles, 11 titles in the last 15 years (2000, 2002, 2003, 2006, 2007, 2008, 2009, 2011, 2012, 2014, and 2015), with Tipperary on 26 titles, 2 titles over the same period (2001 and 2010).

The teams had previously played each other 26 times in the championship, the first time being in 1887, with Kilkenny winning 12 times and Tipperary winning on 13 occasions with one draw in 2014.

Since the 2010 All-Ireland Final, Kilkenny had 10 wins and a draw in 13 league and championship games against Tipperary.

An open night for Tipperary hurling supporters was held at Dr Morris Park in Thurles on 16 August. The Tipperary Association Dublin hosted the traditional Post Match Banquet for the Tipperary teams, continuing a tradition lasting over 50 years, where Tipperary teams appearing in All-Ireland finals are hosted by the Tipperary Association Dublin. The Banquet was held in the Double Tree Hilton Hotel in Dublin. Michael Ryan made one change to the team for the final with John O’Dwyer coming in at top of the right instead of Niall O Meara with John McGrath moving to top of the left. There were five All-Ireland Final debutants in Tipperary's starting line-up.

Grainne Seoige and Des Cahill presented Up for the Match on 3 September on RTÉ One.

==== Match Summary ====
Tipperary won the game on a 2–29 to 2-20 scoreline to claim their 27th All-Ireland title.

On a warm dry day with no wind Seamus Callanan opened the scoring after two minutes with a point from out on the left which he hit over his left shoulder. Kevin Kelly equalized for Kilkenny in the fifth minute before TJ Reid scored from a free to put Kilkenny into a one-point lead. After ten minutes, Séamus Kennedy scored his first ever championship point to make it four points all, after fifteen minutes it was six all. John O’Dwyer scored a point after twenty five minutes to level the scores at nine all. The half-time score was Tipperary 0-14 Kilkenny 0–12 with every single Tipperary forward scoring from play. The sides were level 10 times in the first half. Seamus Callinan had five points in the first half and scored the first point of the second half from a free to open the lead to three points. After forty-one minutes, Kevin Kelly scored a goal for Kilkenny when he scoped and flicked the ball into the empty net in front of the hill 16 end. Seamus Callinan got the next score from a free to put one point between them. Jason Forde who had come on as a substitute a minute earlier for Michael Breen scored a point to level the game in the forty fifth minute. Two minutes later John O’Dwyer picked up the ball and got past Paul Murphy before cutting in from the left and hitting a low shot from distance that flew into the back of the net to put Tipperary into a four-point lead. Pauric Maher scored a point from out on the left touchline under the Cusack Stand in the fifty-first minute to increase the lead to five. Tipperary were six ahead in the fifty-sixth minute after another Seamus Callinan point. With ten minutes left John McGrath scored a second goal for Tipperary when he cut in from the right and hit a high shot to the left after a pass from Noel McGrath, this put Tipperary nine points clear. Two minutes later Richie Hogan scored with a ground shot to the net to reduce the lead to six. Tipperary then scored a further four points to go into stoppage time with a nine-point lead which they held to the end to claim the title.

Tipperary captain Brendan Maher accepted the Liam MacCarthy Cup from GAA president Aogán Ó Fearghail in the Hogan Stand. Maher admitted afterwards that he forgot to thank manager Michael Ryan and his management team in his acceptance speech. The Tipperary team then did a victory lap around Croke Park with the trophy.

4 September
15:30
All Ireland Final

Tipperary	2-29 - 2-20	Kilkenny
Seamus Callanan 0-13 (3f, ’65), John O’Dwyer 1-5 (1 sl, 1f), John McGrath 1-3, Patrick Maher 0-2, Jason Forde 0-2, Padraic Maher 0-1, Séamus Kennedy 0-1, Dan McCormack 0-1, Noel McGrath 0-1	Report D. Gleeson; C. Barrett, J. Barry, M. Cahill; S. Kennedy, R. Maher, Pádraic Maher; B. Maher (c), M. Breen; D. McCormack, Patrick Maher, N. McGrath; J O’Dwyer, S. Callanan, J. McGrath; Subs:Jason Forde for M Breen (45), Aidan McCormack for Dan McCormack (62), Donagh Maher for Michael Cahill (65), Kieran Bergin for Noel McGrath (70), Tomás Hamill for Séamus Kennedy (73)	TJ Reid 0-11 (10f, 1’65), Kevin Kelly 1-2, Richie Hogan 1-1, Padraig Walsh 0-2, Eoin Larkin 0-2, Cillian Buckley 0-1, Walter Walsh 0-1

Croke Park
Attendance: 82,016
Referee: Brian Gavin (Offaly)

Kilkenny	Tipperary

KILKENNY:
1	Eoin Murphy
2	Paul Murphy
3	Joey Holden
4	Shane Prendergast (captain)
5	Pádraig Walsh
6	Kieran Joyce
7	Cillian Buckley
8	T. J. Reid
9	Conor Fogarty
10	Walter Walsh
11	Richie Hogan
12	Eoin Larkin
13	Kevin Kelly
14	Colin Fennelly
15	Liam Blanchfield
Substitutes:
18	Rob Lennon for K. Joyce (60 mins)
21	Lester Ryan for E. Larkin (60 mins)
Manager:
Brian Cody

TIPPERARY:
1	Darren Gleeson
2	Cathal Barrett
3	James Barry
4	Michael Cahill
5	Séamus Kennedy
6	Ronan Maher
7	Pádraic Maher
8	Brendan Maher (captain)
9	Michael Breen
10	Dan McCormack
11	Patrick Maher
12	Noel McGrath
13	John O'Dwyer
14	Séamus Callinan
15	John McGrath
Substitutes:
19	Jason Forde for M. Breen (45 mins)
25	Niall O'Meara for D. McCormack (62 mins)
22	Donagh Maher for M. Cahill (65 mins)
17	Kieran Bergin for N. McGrath (70 mins)
20	Thomas Hamill for S. Kennedy (72 mins)
Manager:
Michael Ryan

Man of the Match:
Séamus Callanan

Linesmen:
Barry Kelly (Westmeath)
Colm Lyons (Cork)

Sideline Official
John Keane (Galway)

Umpires
Michael Gavin
David Gavin
William Flynn
PJ Lawlor

==== Reaction ====
Tipperary manager Michel Ryan speaking after the match said it was a fantastic day for Tipperary hurling, with Kilkenny manager Brian Cody saying that the better team won on the day. Highlights of the final were shown on The Sunday Game programme which aired at 9:30pm that night on RTÉ Two and was presented by Des Cahill with match analysis from Brendan Cummins, Eddie Brennan, and Cyril Farrell. On the man of the match award shortlist were John O'Dwyer, Ronan Maher, and Seamus Callanan, with Seamus Callanan winning the award which was presented by GAA president Aogán Ó Fearghail at the post match Tipperary function at the Double Tree Hilton Hotel in Dublin. Tipperary manager Michael Ryan and captain Brendan Maher were interviewed by Michael Lyster before Michael Ryan opened the envelope that contained the man of the match winning players name.

John O’Dwyer spoke to RTÉ Sport directly after the match couldn't contain himself when he cursed live on air. The next day O'Dwyer apologised for the slip of the tongue.

Cathal Barrett was very satisfied with the win and thinks the team proved the doubters wrong.

Darren Gleeson was thankful for getting to play in the final and getting another winners medal.

Pádraic Maher was happy to get his hands on another medal and first since 2010. "I know it is easy to say now because we won but to be honest with you for the few of us who have been there so long, to be beaten in another All-Ireland final, no matter who beat us, it would have been some sucker punch. That’s why it is such a big relief to get over the line."

==== Homecoming ====
The Tipperary team made the traditional visit to Our Lady's Children's Hospital in Crumlin on 5 September before returning home by bus where the homecoming event was held at Semple Stadium in Thurles.

A stage was set up on the dome side of the stadium with the gates of the stadium opened at 4.00 pm. The Tipperary senior back-room team and players were introduced to a crowd of over 20,000 at 8.00 pm, preceded by the minor squad, who helped the county to their first minor-senior double since 1949. Michael Ryan and Brendan Maher then addressed the crowd. The Tipperary players and fans also sang the traditional Tipperary song "Slievenamon" together. The team then departed as per tradition for the captain's home town, this time being Brendan Maher's home village of Borrisoleigh. The team celebrated on 10 September in Upperchurch, the home club of Michael Ryan and James Barry. 16-T-LIAM number plates were issued for sale to celebrate the win. Tipp FM provided live radio coverage of the homecoming.

== Awards ==
Sunday Game Team of the Year

The Sunday Game team of the year was picked on 4 September, which was the night of the final. The panel consisting of Brendan Cummins, Henry Shefflin, Michael Duignan, Ger Loughnane, Liam Sheedy, Eddie Brennan and Cyril Farrell selected Tipperary's Séamus Callanan as the Sunday game player of the year. Other players nominated were Padraic Maher and John McGrath of Tipperary. Cathal Barrett, James Barry, Ronan Maher, Padraic Maher, Patrick Maher, Seamus Callanan, and John McGrath were all named on the team of the year by the panel.

GAA GPA All Stars Awards

The nominations for the GAA GPA All Stars Awards were announced on 7 October with Tipperary receiving 15 nominations, with all 15 starters from the All-Ireland victory over Kilkenny being nominated. Seamus Callanan and Pádraic Maher were also nominated for All Stars Hurler of the Year alongside Waterford's Austin Gleeson. The All Star team and hurler of the year awards were announced live at a banquet in Dublin's Convention centre on 4 November.

Tipperary had seven players named on the All Star hurling team, Cathal Barrett, James Barry, Ronan Maher, Padraic Maher, Patrick Maher, Seamus Callanan, and John McGrath. It was a first All-Star award for Cathal Barrett, James Barry, Ronan Maher and John McGrath and the seven awards equaled their all-time annual best. Seamus Callanan and Pádraic Maher missed out on the player of the year award to Austin Gleeson with Tipperary manager Michael Ryan announcing the winner. The All Star team was chosen by a panel of journalists whereas the individual awards were voted on by inter-county players under the supervision of the Gaelic Players Association.

RTE Sports Awards

In December Séamus Callanan was nominated for the 2016 RTÉ Sports Person of the Year award. The Tipperary team were nominated for the RTÉ Sports Team of the Year Award and Michael Ryan was also nominated for the RTÉ Sports Manager of the Year Award.

Munster GAA Awards

On 10 December Michael Ryan was presented with the Munster GAA Manager of the Year award. John McGrath won the Senior Hurler of the Year award.

== 2017 season ==
On 28 November 2016, Pádraic Maher was named as the new captain of the Tipperary Senior hurling team.

== Retirements ==
On 25 October 2016, Conor O'Brien announced his retirement from inter-county hurling. O'Brien said that it had been a great privilege and honour to represent Tipperary at senior level and enjoyed his time on the team.

On 22 November 2016, Paddy Stapleton announced his retirement from inter-county hurling. Stapleton started out in the team in 2006 when Babs Keating first picked him in the panel. He thanked his family and colleagues for their support during his career.

On 23 November 2016, Gearóid Ryan announced his retirement from inter-county hurling. Persistent injuries, including a double hip-surgery in 2013, had hampered his fitness. Ryan had found it hard to get into the team in the past few seasons and thanked his family for their support during his career.

== See also ==
- 2016 Tipperary county football team season
