= Andrew Coffey =

Andrew Coffey may refer to:

- Andrew Coffey (Everton F.C. chairman) (1870–1942)
- Andrew Coffey (hurler), Irish sportsperson
- Death of Andrew Coffey, American hazing victim
