= Niall O'Meara =

Irish hurler

Personal information
- Native name: Níall Ó Meadhra (Irish)
- Born: 16 December 1992 (age 33) Kilruane, County Tipperary, Ireland
- Occupation: Primary school teacher
- Height: 1.8 m (5 ft 11 in)

Sport
- Sport: Hurling
- Position: Left wing-forward
Clubs
- Years: Club
- Kilruane MacDonagh's; Thomas MacDonagh's
Club titles
	Football	Hurling
Tipperary titles	1	1
College
- Years: College
- 2012-2016: Mary Immaculate College
College titles
- Fitzgibbon titles: 1
Inter-county*
Years	County	Apps (scores)
2014–2023	Tipperary	18 (1-09)
Inter-county titles
- Munster titles: 2
- All-Irelands: 2
- NHL: 0
- All Stars: 0
- *Inter County team apps and scores correct as of 22:14, 18 November 2019.

Niall O'Meara (born 16 December 1992) is an Irish hurler who plays for Tipperary Senior Championship club Kilruane MacDonagh's and formerly at inter-county level with the Tipperary senior hurling team. He usually lines out as a left wing-forward.

== Playing career ==
=== Mary Immaculate College ===
During his studies at Mary Immaculate College, O'Meara was selected for the college's senior hurling team during his second year. On 27 February 2016, he was selected at right wing-forward but spent much of the game at left corner-forward when Mary Immaculate College faced the University of Limerick in the Fitzgibbon Cup final. O'Meara ended the game with a winners' medal following the 1–30 to 3–22 victory.

=== Kilruane MacDonagh's ===
O'Meara joined the Kilruane MacDonagh's club at a young age and played in all grades at juvenile and underage levels. He enjoyed championship success in the under-21 grade before joining the club's senior.

On 16 September 2018, O'Meara lined out at centre-back when Kilruane MacDonagh's qualified for the North Tipperary Championship final. He scored a point from play and claimed a winners' medal after the 0–19 to 0–12 defeat of Kiladangan.

On 30 October 2022, O'Meara started as Kilruane MacDonaghs defeated Kiladangan 2–20 to 1–16 in the 2022 Tipperary Senior Hurling Championship final after a replay, it was their first title since 1985.

=== Thomas MacDonagh's ===
O'Meara was just 18-years-old when he was selected for the Thomas MacDonagh's amalgamated team in the 2011 Tipperary Football Championship. On 6 November 2011, he lined out at centre-back when the team qualified for a meeting with Moyle Rovers in the final. O'Meara ended the game with a winners' medal after a 0–09 to 0–07 victory.

On 4 November 2012, O'Meara again lined out at centre-back when Thomas MacDonagh's qualified for a second successive final. He ended the game on the losing side after a 1–09 to 0–05 defeat by Clonmel Commercials.

=== Tipperary ===
==== Minor and under-21 ====
O'Meara first played for Tipperary as a member of the minor team during the 2010 Munster Championship. He made his first appearance for the team on 5 May 2010 when he lined out at centre-forward in a 0–17 to 1–13 defeat by Clare.

O'Meara was drafted onto the Tipperary under-21 team in advance of the 2012 Munster Championship. He made his first appearance for the team on 6 June 2012 when he lined out at right wing-forward in an 0–18 to 0–17 defeat of Cork. On 8 August 2012, O'Meara was switched to midfield when Tipperary suffered a 1–16 to 1–14 defeat by Clare in the Munster final.

O'Meara was appointed captain of the Tipperary under-21 team for the 2013 Munster Championship. On 7 August 2013, he captained the team to a 1–17 to 2–10 defeat by Clare in a second successive Munster final.

==== Intermediate ====
On 31 August 2013, O'Meara was selected at left wing-forward when Tipperary faced Kilkenny in the All-Ireland final. He scored four points from play and ended the game with a winners' medal following the 2–14 to 2–11 victory.

==== Senior ====
O'Meara was added to the Tipperary senior team prior to the start of the 2014 National League. He made his first appearance for the team on 30 March 2014 when he scored a goal from left corner-forward in a 3–25 to 4–19 defeat of Cork. On 4 May 2014, O'Meara again lined out at left corner-forward when Tipperary suffered a 2–25 to 1–27 defeat by Kilkenny in the National League final. On 7 September 2014, he was selected amongst the substitutes when Tipperary drew 1–28 to 3–22 with Kilkenny in the All-Ireland final. He was again named on the bench for the replay on 27 September 2014 and ended the game on the losing side after a 2–17 to 2–14 defeat.

On 12 July 2015, O'Meara was selected at left corner-forward when Tipperary faced Waterford in the Munster final. He scored three points from play and claimed his first Munster Championship medal following the 0–21 to 0–16 victory.

O'Meara won a second Munster Championship medal on 10 July 2016 after lining out at left corner-forward in a 5–19 to 0–13 defeat of Waterford in the final. On 5 September 2016, he was named amongst the substitutes for Tipperary's All-Ireland final meeting with Kilkenny. O'Meara was introduced as a substitute for Dan McCormack at right wing-forward and claimed an All-Ireland medal following a 2–29 to 2–20 victory.

On 23 April 2017, O'Meara was named on the bench when Tipperary faced Galway in the National League final. He was introduced as a substitute for Seán O'Brien at left wing-forward but ended the game on the losing side following a 3–21 to 0–14 defeat.

O'Meara missed most of the 2018 National League due to injury but returned to the panel in April.

On 30 June 2019, O'Meara was named on the bench when Tipperary faced Limerick in the Munster final. He was introduced as a substitute for Michael Breen at midfield but ended the game on the losing side following a 2–26 to 2–14 defeat. On 18 August 2019, O'Meara lined out at centre-forward when Tipperary faced Kilkenny in the All-Ireland final. He scored his first championship goal during the game and collected a second All-Ireland winners' medal following the 3–25 to 0–20 victory.

On 3 November 2023, O'Meara announced his retirement from inter-county hurling.

== Career statistics ==
As of match played 18 August 2019.

Team	Year	National League			Munster		All-Ireland		Total	
Team	Year	Division	Apps	Score	Apps	Score	Apps	Score	Apps	Score
Tipperary	2014	Division 1A	3	1-05	1	0-01	0	0-00	4	1-06
Tipperary	2015	Division 1A	5	1-08	2	0-04	1	0-00	8	1-12
Tipperary	2016	Division 1A	5	2-01	3	0-00	2	0-00	10	2-01
Tipperary	2017	Division 1A	8	1-09	1	0-01	3	0-02	12	1-12
Tipperary	2018	Division 1A	0	0-00	0	0-00	—		0	0-00
Tipperary	2019	Division 1A	6	0-07	2	0-01	3	1-00	11	1-08
Career total			27	5-30	9	0-07	9	1-02	45	6-39

== Honours ==
Mary Immaculate College

- Fitzgibbon Cup (1): 2016

Thomas MacDonagh's

- Tipperary Senior Football Championship (1): 2011

Kilruane MacDonagh's

- North Tipperary Senior Hurling Championship (1): 2018
- Tipperary Under-21 A Hurling Championship (1): 2010
- Tipperary Senior Hurling Championship (1): 2022

Tipperary

- All-Ireland Senior Hurling Championship (2): 2016, 2019
- Munster Senior Hurling Championship (2): 2015, 2016
- All-Ireland Intermediate Hurling Championship (1): 2013
- Munster Intermediate Hurling Championship (1): 2013
