= Robert Lennon =

Robert Lennon may refer to:

- J. Robert Lennon (born 1970), American writer and musician
- Robert L. Lennon (1933–2021), American politician, member of the Mississippi House of Representatives
- Bob Lennon (1928–2005), American baseball player
- Rob Lennon (born 1993), Irish hurler
