= William Gibbons =

William Gibbons may refer to:

- William Gibbons (explorer) (fl. 1612), English explorer of Canadian waters; see Baffin Bay § History
- William Gibbons (physician) (1649–1728), English physician
- William Gibbons (American politician) (1726–1800), American lawyer and delegate to the Continental Congress
- William Gibbons (British politician) (1898–1976), British politician
- William Conrad Gibbons (1926–2015), American historian and foreign policy expert
- William D. Gibbons (1825–1886), African-American Baptist minister
- William M. Gibbons (1919–1990), American lawyer and railroad executive
- Bill Gibbons, American attorney
- Bill Gibbons (basketball), American basketball coach
- Billy Gibbons (born 1949), American guitarist

== See also ==
- Bill Gibbins (1872–1956), chairman of Everton F.C.
