= Joe Gallagher =

Joe or Joseph Gallagher may refer to:

- Joe Gallagher (baseball) (1914–1998), American baseball player
- Joe Gallagher (footballer) (born 1955), British association footballer
- Joseph Gallagher (born 1964), British chess grand master
- Joe Gallagher (boxing) (born 1968), British former boxer and trainer
- Joe Gallagher (hurler), Irish hurler
