= 2019 All-Ireland Senior Hurling Championship final =

- Event: 2019 All-Ireland Senior Hurling Championship
Kilkenny	Tipperary
0–20	3–25
- Date: 18 August 2019
- Venue: Croke Park, Dublin
- Man of the Match: Noel McGrath
- Referee: James Owens (Wexford)
- Attendance: 82,300
- Weather: 17 °C, heavy rain, sunny periods

The 2019 All-Ireland Senior Hurling Championship final was a hurling match played at Croke Park in Dublin on 18 August 2019 between Kilkenny and Tipperary, the culmination of the 2019 All-Ireland Senior Hurling Championship. It was the 132nd final of that sport's primary competition, the All-Ireland Senior Hurling Championship.

Tipperary defeated Kilkenny to claim their 28th All-Ireland title.

The match was televised live on RTÉ2 as part of The Sunday Game presented by Joanne Cantwell from the Croke Park studio with analysis by Anthony Daly, Donal Óg Cusack and Henry Shefflin. Commentary on the game was provided by Marty Morrissey alongside Michael Duignan. The match was also live on Sky Sports presented by Rachel Wyse and Brian Carney with analysis from Ollie Canning, Jamesie O'Connor and J. J. Delaney.

An average of 804,500 viewers tuned in to watch the final on RTÉ with a peak audience of 901,900 just after 5pm.

== Background ==
This was the ninth time since 2009 that the counties have played each other in the championship, with Kilkenny winning 5 times. Kilkenny went into the final having won 36 All Ireland titles, 11 titles in the last 18 years (2000, 2002, 2003, 2006, 2007, 2008, 2009, 2011, 2012, 2014, and 2015), with Tipperary on 27 titles, 3 titles over the same period (2001, 2010, and 2016).

The teams had played each other 27 times in the championship, the first time being in 1887, with Kilkenny winning 12 times and Tipperary winning on 14 occasions with one draw in the final in 2014.

Kilkenny had played in 66 All-Ireland finals, winning 36, losing 26 and drawing 4, with Tipperary having appeared in 41 All-Ireland finals, winning 27, losing 12 and drawing 2.

This was only the third occasion, since the introduction of the "back door" in 1997, that neither the Leinster Senior Hurling Championship winners (2019: Wexford) nor the Munster Senior Hurling Championship winners (2019: Limerick) have reached the final. This previously occurred in:

- 2004 (Wexford and Waterford were provincial champions, final was Cork v Kilkenny)
- 2013 (Dublin and Limerick were provincial champions, final was Clare v Cork)

== Paths to the final ==
=== Kilkenny ===
==== Leinster Championship ====
11 May 2019 Round 1	Kilkenny	2-23 (29) – (24) 1-21	Dublin	Kilkenny
19:00		(HT: 0-12 - 1-13)		Venue: Nowlan Park
	Gls: TJ Reid 2 (1pen); Pts: TJ Reid 12 (11f, 1’65) A Murphy 3, G Aylward 2, R Leahy 2, A Mullen 1, W Walsh 1, T Walsh 1, P Walsh 1	Report	Gls: S Moran 1 (1 pen). Pts: D Treacy 6 (6f), S Moran 2 (1 pen, 1f), D Sutcliffe 4, C Crummey 2, F Whitely 2, S Treacy 1, D O’Connell 1, P Ryan 1, L Rushe 1, T Connolly 1.	Referee: C McAllister (Cork); Attendance: 9,495; TV: Sky Sports

19 May 2019 Round 2	Carlow	1-14 (17) – (31) 3-22	Kilkenny	Carlow
15:00				Venue: Netwatch Cullen Park
	Gls: J Doyle 1 Pts: M Kavanagh 5 (4f), C Nolan 3 (1f), S Murphy 2, J Doyle 1, J Kavanagh 1, D English 1, B Tracy 1 (1f)	Report	Gls: TJ Reid 1 (1pen), C Fennelly 1, G Aylward 1 Pts: TJ Reid 12 (8f, 1'65), J Donnelly 2, A Murphy 2, C Fennelly 1, G Alyward 1, R Leahy 1, W Walsh 1, A Mullen 1, B Ryan 1	Referee: A Kelly (Galway); Attendance: 7,050

9 June 2019 Round 4	Kilkenny	2-22 (28) – (29) 3-20	Galway	Kilkenny
14:00				Venue: Nowlan Park
	Gls: TJ Reid 2. Pts: TJ Reid 11 (6f, 1’65’), B Ryan 3, B Sheehan 2, R Leahy 2, C Fennelly 1, A Murphy 1, P Deegan 1, C Fennelly 1.	Report	Gls: C Whelan 1, B Concannon 1, J Coen 1. Pts: C Mannion 8 (1f), J Flynn 3 (2f), C Whelan 2, A Tuohey 2, B Concannon 2, J Coen 1, J Glynn 1, David Burke 1.	Referee: C Lyons (Cork); Attendance: 15, 778; TV: RTÉ

15 June 2019 Round 5	Wexford	0-21 (21) – (21) 1-18	Kilkenny	Wexford
19:00				Venue: Innovate Wexford Park
	Pts: L Chin 6 (6f), D O'Keeffe 4, R O'Connor 2, P Morris 2, C McDonald 2, J O'Connor 2, P Foley 2 (2f), K Foley 1	Report	Gls: A Mullen 1 Pts: TJ Reid 7 (7f), A Mullen 3, C Fennelly 2, P Murphy 1, J Holden 1, C Fogarty 1, P Walsh 1, P Deegan 1, W Walsh 1	Referee: Fergal Horan (Tipperary); Attendance: 15,200; TV: Sky Sports

Kilkenny finished first in the Leinster round-robin and so went into the Leinster Final.

30 June 2019 Final	Wexford	1-23 (26) – (23) 0-23	Kilkenny	Dublin
16:00				Venue: Croke Park
	Gls: M Fanning 1 Pts: L Chin 9 (7f, 1 65), C McDonald 4 1, R O’Connor 4, D O’Keeffe 2, S Donohoe 1, P Morris 1, L Og McGovern 1, M Fanning 1, J O’Connor 1	Report	Pts: TJ Reid 12 (7f, 1 65), A Mullen 3, W Walsh 2, C Fennelly 2, A Murphy 1, J Maher 1, E Murphy 1, G Aylward 1	Referee: John Keenan (Wicklow); Attendance: 51,482; TV: RTE

==== All-Ireland series ====
14 July 2019 All-Ireland quarter-final	Kilkenny	2-27 (33) – (27) 3-18	Cork	Dublin
14:00		(HT: 2-10 – 1-11)		Venue: Croke Park
	Gls: C Fennelly 1, R Hogan 1 Pts: TJ Reid 10 (10f), W Walsh 3, R Hogan 2, J Donnelly 2, C Fogarty 2, B Ryan 2, C Fennelly 1, C Browne 1, A Mullen 1, R Leahy 1, E Murphy 1 (1f), B Sheehan 1	Report	Gls: P Horgan 3 (1p); Pts: P Horgan 10 (8f), A Cadogan 4, S Harnedy 2, M Coleman 1, D Fitzgibbon 1	Referee: J Owens (Wexford); TV: RTÉ

27 July 2019 All-Ireland semi-final	Limerick	2-17 (23) – (24) 1-21	Kilkenny	Dublin
18:00				Venue: Croke Park
	Gls: A Gillane 1 (pen), S Dowling 1. Pts: Aaron Gillane 9 (6f), G Mulcahy 2, D Byrnes (1f, 1 65) 2, T Morrissey 1, P Casey 1, B Nash 1, D Reidy 1.	Report	Gls: C Fennelly 1 Pts: TJ Reid 8 (7f, 1 sideline), A Mullen 4, C Fennelly 3, W Walsh 2, P Walsh 1, J Donnelly 1, R Hogan 1, J Maher 1.	Referee: A Kelly (Galway); Attendance: 55,001; TV: RTE; Sky Sports

=== Tipperary ===
==== Munster Championship ====
12 May 2019 Round 1	Cork	1-24 (27) – (34) 2-28	Tipperary	Cork
16:00				Venue: Páirc Uí Chaoimh
	Gls: S Harnedy 1 Pts: P Horgan 14 (10f), C Lehane 3, S Kingston 3, S Harnedy 2, T O’Mahony 1, R O’Flynn 1	Report	Gls: S Callanan 1, J McGrath 1 Pts: J O’Dwyer 7, N McGrath 4 (1 65'), S Callanan 4, J Forde 5 (3f), B Maher 2, P Maher 1, R Maher 1, M Breen 1, N O’Meara 1, P Maher 1, J McGrath 1	Referee: Seán Cleere (Kilkenny); Attendance: 30,274; TV: RTÉ

19 May 2019 Round 2	Tipperary	2-30 (36) – (18) 0-18	Waterford	Thurles
14:00				Venue: Semple Stadium
	Gls: J Forde 1, S Callanan 1 Pts: J Forde 9 (4f), J McGrath 5, M Breen 6, J O'Dwyer 4, N McGrath 2 (1f), R Maher 1, B Heffernan 1, J Morris 1	Report	Pts: P Mahony 9 (7f), T Ryan 3, A Gleeson 2, T de Burca 1, Stephen Bennett 1.	Referee: J Keenan (Wicklow); Attendance: 22,883; TV: RTÉ

2 June 2019 Round 3	Clare	0-17 (17) – (30) 3-21	Tipperary	Ennis
16:00				Venue: Cusack Park
	Pts: P Duggan 9 (8f), T Kelly 3 (2f), P Collins 1, D Fitzgerald 1, S Golden 1, S McCarthy 1, D Ryan 1		Gls: S Callanan 1, P Maher 1, N McGrath 1 Pts: J McGrath 6, J Forde 6 (6f), S Callanan 3, N McGrath 2, P Maher 2, J O'Dwyer 1, B Maher 1	Referee: A Kelly (Galway); Attendance: 18,216; TV: RTÉ

16 June 2019 Round 5	Tipperary	1-22 (25) – (21) 0-21	Limerick	Thurles
14:00				Venue: Semple Stadium
	Gls: S Callanan 1. Pts: J Forde 9 (4f, 2 sideline), S Callanan 4, P Maher 2, N McGrath (1f) 2, B Maher 1, M Breen 1, J Morris 1, J McGrath 1, J O'Dwyer 1.	Report	Pts: A Gillane 13 (9f, 1 '65), T Morrissey 3, D Byrnes 2 (1 '65), S Dowling 1, G Mulcahy 1, Lynch 1.	Referee: S Cleere (Kilkenny); Attendance: 39,115; TV: RTÉ

Tipperary finished first in the Munster round-robin and so went into the Munster Final.

30 June 2019 Munster Final	Limerick	2-26 (32) – (20) 2-14	Tipperary	Limerick
14:00		(HT: 1-11 - 1-09)		Venue: LIT Gaelic Grounds
	Gls: P Casey 1, K Hayes 1. Pts: P Casey 5, T Morrissey 4, A Gillane (3f) 4, G Hegarty 3, D Byrnes (3f) 3, K Hayes 2, G Mulcahy 2, B Nash 1.	Report	Gls: S Callanan 1, J McGrath 1. Pts: J Forde 6 (3f), R Maher 2, N McGrath (1f) 1, S Callanan 1, D McCormack 1, J O’Dwyer 1, J Morris 1, J Cahill 1.	Referee: P O'Dwyer (Carlow); Attendance: 44,052; TV: RTÉ

==== All-Ireland series ====
14 July 2019 All-Ireland quarter-final	Tipperary	2-25 (31) – (21) 1-18	Laois	Dublin
16:00		(HT: 2-11 – 1-10)		Venue: Croke Park
	Gls: J Forde 1 (1p), S Callanan 1 Pts: J Forde 12 (10f), S Callanan 2, G Browne 2, N McGrath 2, J McGrath 2, R Maher 2, A Flynn 1, Padraic Maher 1	Report	Gls: R King 1, Pts: M Kavanagh 10 (10f), A Dunphy 2, J Kelly 1, W Dunphy 1, J Lennon 1, P Purcell 1	Referee: C Lyons (Cork); TV: RTÉ

28 July 2019 All-Ireland semi-final	Wexford	3-20 (29) – (31) 1-28	Tipperary	Dublin
15:30				Venue: Croke Park
	Gls: C McDonald 2, L Chin 1. Pts: L Chin 7, (6f, 1 65), R O'Connor 3, P Morris 2, D O'Keeffe 2, L Ryan 1, P Foley 1, L Og McGovern 1, K Foley 1, J O Connor 1, C McDonald 1.	Report	Gls: S Callanan 1. Pts: J Forde 12 (8f, 2 65s), N McGrath 4, J O'Dwyer 3, R Maher 2, S Callanan 2, M Breen 1, G Browne 1, W Connors 1, M Kehoe 1, J Morris 1.	Referee: S Cleere (Kilkenny); Attendance: 61,852; TV: RTE; Sky Sports

== Pre-match ==
=== Ticketing ===
With a stadium capacity of 82,300, the 32 individual county boards received 60,000 tickets. Schools and third level colleges got 2,500 tickets, while season ticket holders were entitled to 5,500 tickets. 1,000 tickets were given to overseas clubs. The Camogie, Ladies' Football, Handball and Rounders Associations were each allocated about 200 tickets, as were the jubilee teams and mini-7s which play at half-time. Demand for tickets was very high in both counties with Tipperary and Kilkenny having received around 32,000 tickets between. Stand tickets were priced at €90 with terrace at €45.

=== Related events ===
The 2019 All-Ireland Minor Hurling Final was played between Galway and Kilkenny as a curtain-raiser to the senior final with Galway winning their third title in a row and 13th overall on a 3–14 to 0–12 scoreline.

=== Jubilee team ===
The Offaly team that won the 1994 All-Ireland Final was presented to the crowd before the match to mark 25 years. RTÉ commentator Michael Duignan was part of the Offaly team.

== Match summary ==
=== Officials ===
On 6 August 2019 the officials were chosen for the final by the GAA, with Wexford's James Owens being named as the referee in what was his third senior final after being the referee in 2015 and 2018. Paud O’Dwyer from Carlow was the standby referee with the other linesman being Johnny Murphy from Limerick and the sideline official was Liam Gordon from Galway.

=== Team news ===
The Tipperary team named for the match on the Friday night was the same that lined out in the semi-final against Wexford. Kilkenny brought Cillian Buckley into the team instead of Richie Leahy from the team that defeated Limerick in the semi-final.

=== Summary ===
In wet and showery conditions, Kilkenny opened the scoring in the first minute with a free from TJ Reid. Michael Breen got Tipperary's first point after 3 minutes to make the score 2–1. A torrential downpour came after around 5 minutes of the game with many heading for cover under the stands. Tipperary playing into the Davin end in the first half might have had a penalty after 9 minutes when Seamus Callanan was pulled down inside the square with the referee awarding a free instead. After 16 minutes Cathal Barrett caught Richie Hogan high across the faceguard with his hurley with Kilkenny being awarded a free which they scored to make it 6–3. Three minutes later Tipperary goalkeeper Brian Hogan caught John Donnelly’s shot from over his crossbar with HawkEye awarding the point. Tipperary scored their first goal of the match after 25 minutes when Niall O'Meara turned past Conor Fogarty before shooting low to the right corner of the net to make the score 0-8 to 1-5. After 33 minutes Cathal Barrett was caught high with a raised elbow by Richie Hogan with the referee showing a straight red card to Hogan. Tipperary had a one point lead at half-time with the score 1-9 to 0-11.

Kilkenny leveled the match with the first point of the second half. After 38 minutes Tipperary got a second goal, with Seamus Callanan getting his eighth goal of the championship when he followed up after John McGrath’s effort was half blocked to scramble the ball low to the left of the net. Five minutes later they got their third goal when Seamus Callanan found John O'Dwyer with a cross-field pass from the right to the left edge of the box with O'Dwyer firing powerfully to the net to put Tipperary into an eight point lead on 3-12 to 0-13. Tipperary eased to victory after that and the full time score was 3-25 to 0-20 to win their 28th All-Ireland title.

== Match details ==
RTÉ
Sky Sports

18 August 2019
15:30 IST (UTC+01:00)
All-Ireland Final

Report

Kilkenny	0-20 (20) – (34) 3-25	Tipperary
(HT: 0-11 – 1-09)
Pts: TJ Reid 11 (10f), John Donnelly 3, Billy Ryan 2, Pádraig Walsh 1, Richie Hogan 1, Colin Fennelly 1, Walter Walsh 1		Gls: Séamus Callanan 1, John O’Dwyer 1, Niall O’Meara 1 Pts: Jason Forde 8 (5f, 2 ‘65), John McGrath 3, Séamus Callanan 2 (1f), John O’Dwyer 2, Noel McGrath 2 (1f), Séamus Kennedy 2, Willie Connors 2, Michael Breen 1, Ger Browne 1, Jake Morris 1, Mark Kehoe 1

Croke Park, Dublin
Referee: James Owens (Wexford)
Attendance: 82,300

Kilkenny	Tipperary

KILKENNY:
1	Eoin Murphy
2	Paul Murphy
3	Huw Lawlor
4	Joey Holden
5	Conor Fogarty
6	Pádraig Walsh
7	Paddy Deegan
8	Conor Browne
9	Cillian Buckley
10	John Donnelly
11	T. J. Reid (captain)
12	Walter Walsh
13	Adrian Mullen
14	Colin Fennelly
15	Richie Hogan
Substitutes:
23	Billy Ryan for Adrian Mullen (39 mins)
21	Richie Leahy for Cillian Buckley (48 mins)
22	James Maher for Conor Browne (54 mins)
17	Conor Delaney for Joey Holden (58 mins)
Manager:
Brian Cody

TIPPERARY:
1	Brian Hogan
2	Cathal Barrett
3	Barry Heffernan
4	Ronan Maher
5	Brendan Maher
6	Pádraic Maher
7	Séamus Kennedy
8	Noel McGrath
9	Michael Breen
10	Dan McCormack
11	John O'Dwyer
12	Niall O'Meara
13	Jason Forde
14	Séamus Callinan (captain)
15	John McGrath
Substitutes:
23	Mark Kehoe for Niall O'Meara (51 mins)
21	Willie Connors for D. McCormack (57 mins)
25	Jake Morris for Jason Forde (60 mins)
26	Seán O'Brien for Cathal Barrett (61 mins)
18	Ger Browne for Michael Breen (63 mins)
Manager:
Liam Sheedy

=== Trophy presentation ===
Tipperary captain Séamus Callanan accepted the Liam MacCarthy Cup from GAA president John Horan in the Hogan Stand. The Tipperary team then did a victory lap around Croke Park with the trophy.

=== Reaction ===
Tipperary captain Séamus Callanan speaking to RTÉ after the match said "It’s everything we f...ing dreamed of, we put in so much work and to finally get there in the end of it is such an unbelievable feeling, I’m so proud of that group there."

Tipperary manager Liam Sheedy speaking to RTÉ Radio singled out his family for special praise on the day of the match.

Kilkenny manager Brian Cody was amazed that a red card was shown to Richie Hogan, saying "We were beaten well in the final score but it is a huge decision to make, to issue a red card".

Former Kilkenny hurler Henry Shefflin speaking on The Sunday Game argued that the red card issued to Richie Hogan for the high tackle on Cathal Barrett should not have been red. Also former Kilkenny hyrler Jackie Tyrrell speaking on the Sunday Game on the night of the final also thought that a red card should not have been shown. Richie Hogan speaking two days after the final insisted that it should never have been a red card. Kilkenny appealed the one match suspension given to Hogan but on 6 November the suspension was upheld.

Highlights of the final were shown on The Sunday Game programme which aired at 9:30pm that night on RTÉ2 and was presented by Des Cahill with match analysis from Brendan Cummins, Cyril Farrell, Jackie Tyrell, Ursula Jacob, Graeme Mulcahy, Derek McGrath and Enda Rowland. On the man of the match award shortlist were Ronan Maher, Noel McGrath and Barry Heffernan with Noel McGrath winning the award which was presented by GAA president John Horan at the post match Tipperary function at the Clayton Burlington Hotel in Dublin.

=== Celebrations ===
The Tipperary team made the traditional visits to Our Lady's Children's Hospital in Crumlin and Temple Street hospital on 19 August before returning home by train where the homecoming event was held at Semple Stadium in Thurles. A temporary stage was set up along the side-line of the new stand for the event with the crowd on the pitch. The Tipperary senior back-room team and players were introduced to a crowd of over 30,000 at 8.00 pm, with all the players and manager introduced and captain Seamus Callanan addressing the crowd after carrying the cup on stage with manager Liam Sheedy. The 2 Johnnies entertained the crowd during the celebrations.
