= Dylan Fitzell =

Irish sportsperson

Sport
- Sport: Hurling
- Position: Half-Back
Club
- Years: Club
- Cashel King Cormacs
Inter-county
Years	County	Apps (scores)
2016–	Tipperary	0 (0-0)

Dylan Fitzell is an Irish sportsperson. He plays hurling with his local club Cashel King Cormacs and with the Tipperary senior inter-county team since 2016.

== Career ==
Fitzell was named in the Tipperary squad for the 2016 National Hurling League and made his league debut on 13 February against Dublin when he came on as a substitute, and scored a point from play.

== Honours ==
Tipperary

- All-Ireland Minor Hurling Championship (1): 2012
- Munster Minor Hurling Championship (1): 2012
- All-Ireland Minor Football Championship (1): 2011
- Munster Minor Football Championship (1): 2011
