= Andrew Coffey (Everton F.C. chairman) =

Everton F.C. chairman

- Born: 1870; West Derby, Liverpool
- Died: 1942

Andrew Coffey (1870–1942) was an Everton Football Club chairman.

He was nominated for a directorship on 15 May 1914. He was a provision merchant with his company based at 67 Victoria Street, Liverpool. He became chairman in August 1920 and remained in the position until June 1922. His successor was Will Cuff.

Two decades later he had a brief stint as chairman again, he was elected chairman in June 1940 but departed within two months. He was succeeded by William Gibbins in August 1940. He died suddenly at his office on 12 February 1942.
