= Séamus Kennedy (hurler) =

Irish Gaelic footballer and hurler

Personal information
- Native name: Séamus Ó Cinnéide (Irish)
- Born: 26 June 1993 (age 33) Clonmel, County Tipperary, Ireland
- Occupation: Young Financial Advisor

Sport
- Sport: Gaelic football
- Position: Right wing-back
Clubs
- Years: Club
- Clonmel Commercials (football); St Mary's (hurling)
Club titles
- Tipperary titles: 8
- Munster titles: 1
Inter-county*
Years	County	Apps (scores)
2015–2026	Tipperary	34 (0-15)
Inter-county titles
- Munster titles: 1
- All-Irelands: 3
- NFL: 0
- All Stars: 0
- *Inter County team apps and scores correct as of match played 21 June 2025.

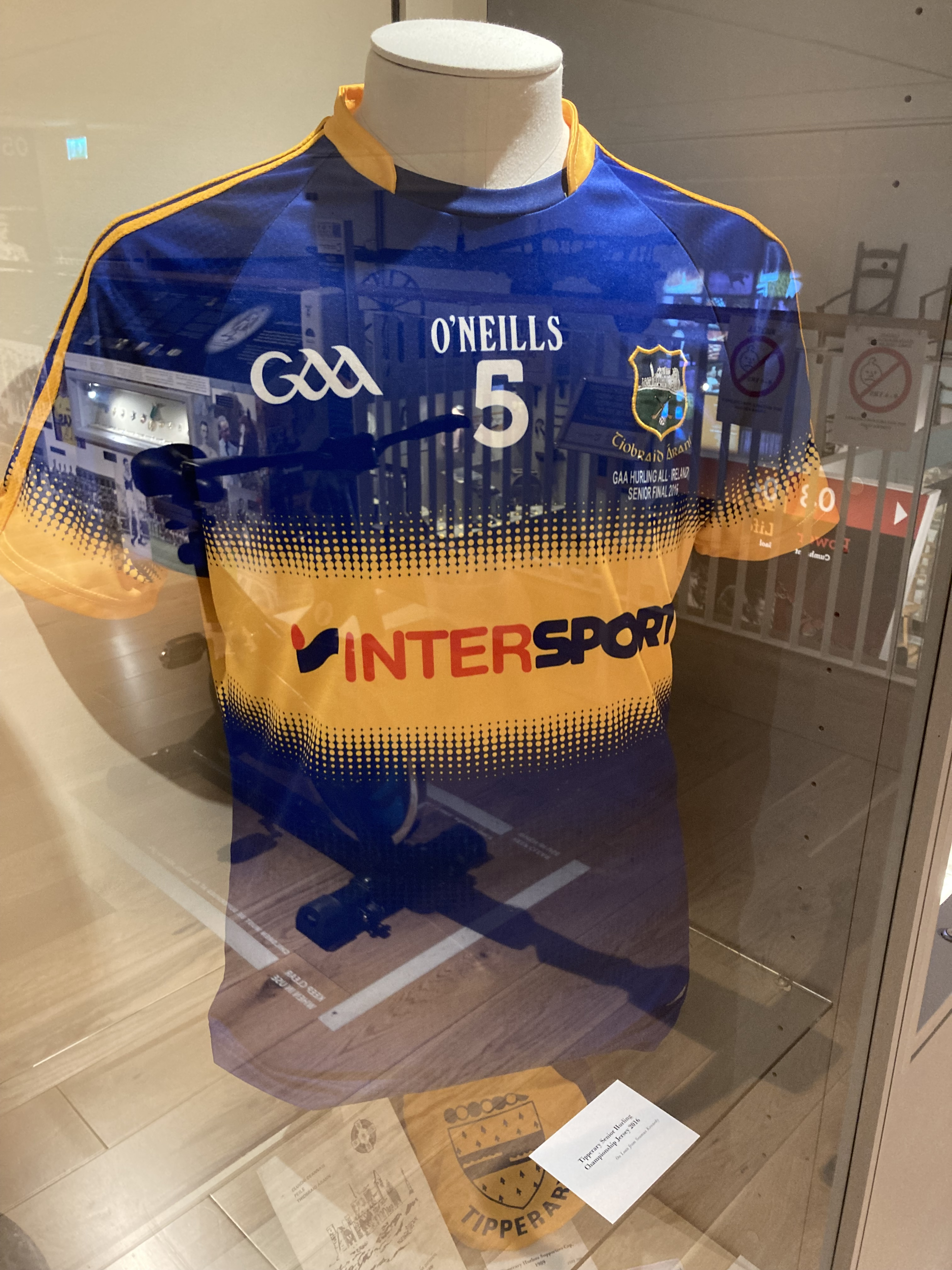
Shirt worn by Kennedy in the 2016 All-Ireland Senior Hurling Championship Final (Tipperary Museum of Hidden History)

Séamus Kennedy (born 26 June 1993) is an Irish Gaelic footballer and hurler who played as a right wing-back for the Tipperary senior teams.

Born in Clonmel, County Tipperary, Kennedy attended Thurles CBS in order to play at Harty Cup level and socialise with John Meaghar. He arrived on the inter-county scene at the age of sixteen when he first linked up with the Tipperary minor hurling in 2010 and 2011, minor football team in 2011, before later joining the under-21 hurling team from 2012 until 2014, and football team in 2013 (as captain) and 2014. He made his senior football debut during the 2015 championship against Waterford, scoring one point in a 1–24 to 0–5 win.

== Career ==
At club level Kennedy is a two-time championship medal with Clonmel Commercials. He also plays hurling with St Mary's.

Kennedy was added to the Tipperary senior hurling team panel during the 2016 season, and made his Championship debut on 22 May 2016 against Cork in the Munster Championship quarter-final. Kennedy started at right half back in the 0–22 to 0–13 win. On 4 September 2016, he started in the half-back line for Tipperary in his first All-Ireland Final as Tipperary defeated Kilkenny by 2–29 to 2-20, with Kennedy getting his first ever championship point in the first half.

He followed this in the 2019 final with two points leading one former well known Tipperary hurler to comment that “he only hurls above in Croke Park.”

In March 2024, Kennedy suffered an ACL rupture playing for Tipperary against Limerick in the 2024 National Hurling League and would be out of action for the rest of the year.

On 20 July in the 2025 All-Ireland final, Kennedy came on as a substitute as Tipperary defeated Cork by 3–27 to 1-19 and claim a 29th All-Ireland title.

On 3 November 2026, Kennedy announced his retirement from inter-county hurling after 11 years with the team. In a statement he said "The time is right for me to retire from intercounty hurling, wearing the blue and gold jersey was a dream come true and I feel very fortunate to have had the opportunity to do so."

== Career statistics ==
As of match played 21 June 2025

Team	Year	National League			Munster		All-Ireland		Total	
Team	Year	Division	Apps	Score	Apps	Score	Apps	Score	Apps	Score
Tipperary	2016	Division 1A			3	0-00	2	0-01	5	0-01
Tipperary	2017	Division 1A			1	0-00	3	0-02	4	0-02
Tipperary	2018	Division 1A			4	0-00	—		4	0-00
Tipperary	2019	Division 1A			0	0-00	2	0-02	2	0-02
Tipperary	2020	Division 1A			—		—		—	
Tipperary	2021	Division 1A			2	0-01	1	0-00	3	0-01
Tipperary	2022	Division 1A			4	0-00	—		4	0-00
Tipperary	2023	Division 1A			4	0-05	2	0-03	6	0-08
Tipperary	2024	Division 1A			—		—		—	
Tipperary	2025	Division 1A			4	0-01	2	0-00	6	0-01
Career total					22	0-07	12	0-08	34	0-15

== Honours ==
=== Player ===
St Mary's Hurling Club, Clonmel

- Tipperary Intermediate Hurling Championship (1): 2017
- Tipperary Premier Intermediate Hurling Championship (1): 2026
- South Tipperary Senior Hurling Championship (1): 2026 (c)

Clonmel Commercials

- Tipperary Senior Football Championship (8): 2012, 2015, 2017, 2019, 2020, 2022, 2023, 2025 (c)
- Munster Senior Club Football Championship (1): 2015

Tipperary

- All-Ireland Minor Football Championship (1): 2011
- Munster Minor Football Championship (1): 2011
- Munster Senior Hurling Championship (1): 2016
- All-Ireland Senior Hurling Championship (3): 2016, 2019, 2025

Mary Immaculate College

- Fitzgibbon Cup (1) : 2016
