= James Barry (hurler) =

Irish hurler (born 1990)

Personal information
- Native name: Séamus de Barra (Irish)
- Born: 29 June 1990 (age 36) Upperchurch, County Tipperary, Ireland
- Occupation: Project Lead
- Height: 6 ft 1 in (185 cm)

Sport
- Sport: Hurling
- Position: Full-back
Club
- Years: Club
- 2005-present: Upperchurch–Drombane
Club titles
- Tipperary titles: 0
College
- Years: College
- 2009-2014: University College Cork
College titles
- Fitzgibbon titles: 2
Inter-county*
Years	County	Apps (scores)
2014-2019	Tipperary	25 (0-00)
Inter-county titles
- Munster titles: 2
- All-Irelands: 2
- NHL: 0
- All Stars: 1
- *Inter County team apps and scores correct as of 22:34, 18 November 2019.

James Barry (born 29 June 1990) is an Irish hurler who plays for Tipperary Senior Championship club Upperchurch–Drombane. He played for the Tipperary senior hurling team for six seasons, during which time he usually lined out in defence as a centre-back and later as a full-back.

Barry began his hurling career at club level with Upperchurch-Drombane. He broke onto the club's top adult team as a 15-year-old in 2005 and has been an ever-present defender since then. As a member of the University College Cork team, Barry won back-to-back Fitzgibbon Cup titles.

Barry lined out for Tipperary in four different grades of hurling over a 12-year period. After making his first appearance for the minor team in May 2007, he ended the year by sharing in the All-Ireland Championship success. Two years with the under-21 team yielded an All-Ireland Championship title in 2010 while he later collected an All-Ireland Championship medal with the intermediate team in 2012. Barry made his competitive debut for the senior team aged 23 in 2014. Over the following six seasons he made a combined total of 51 National League and Championship appearances and won All-Ireland Championship medals at full-back in 2016 and as a non-playing substitute in 2019. Barry also claimed back-to-back Munster Championships in 2015 and 2016 as well as an All-Star. He announced his retirement from inter-county hurling on 25 October 2019.

== Playing career ==
=== Thurles CBS ===
Barry first came to prominence as a hurler with Thurles CBS. He played in every grade before eventually joining the college's senior team. On 8 March 2008, he lined out at centre-back when Thurles CBS suffered a 1–11 to 0–07 defeat by De La Salle College from Waterford in the Harty Cup final. Barry was again at centre-back when Thurles CBS and De La Salle renewed their rivalry in the All-Ireland final. The game ended in a 1–15 to 2–12 draw. The replay a week later saw Barry end up on the losing side following a 2–09 to 2–08 victory for De La Salle College.

On 7 March 2009, Barry captained Thurles CBS to a second successive appearance in the Harty Cup final. A 3–15 to 0–10 defeat of St. Caimin's Community School from Shannon saw him claim a winners' medal. An injury resulted in Barry being named on the bench for the All-Ireland final against Good Counsel College from New Ross on 13 April 2009. He came on as a half-time substitute and collected a winners' medal following the 1–17 to 1–15 victory.

=== University College Cork ===
Barry studied at University College Cork and joined the senior hurling team in his second year at the university. On 3 March 2012, he was at right wing-back when UCC defeated the Cork Institute of Technology by 2–15 to 2–14 to win the Fitzgibbon Cup.

On 2 March 2013, Barry lined out at right wing-back in a second consecutive Fitzgibbon Cup final. He ended the game with a second winners' medal following UCC's 2–17 to 2–12 defeat of Mary Immaculate College.

=== Upperchurch–Drombane ===
Barry joined the Upperchurch–Drombane club at a young age and played in all grades at juvenile and underage levels, enjoying championship success in the under-21 grade. He was just 15-years-old when he first became involved in Upperchurch–Drombane's top adult team.

=== Tipperary ===
==== Minor and under-21 ====
Barry was just 16-years-old when he was selected for the Tipperary minor hurling team prior to the start of the 2007 Munster Championship. He made his first appearance for the team on 2 May 2007 when he came on as a 26th-minute substitute for Joe Gallagher at midfield in a 3–12 to 1–11 defeat of Clare. Barry was again named on the bench when Tipperary faced Cork in the Munster final on 8 July 2007. He was again introduced as a substitute and ended the game with a winners' medal following the 0–18 to 1–11 victory. On 2 September 2007, Barry was selected at right wing-back when Tipperary faced Cork in the All-Ireland final. He ended the game with an All-Ireland medal following the 3–14 to 2–11 victory.

Barry was again eligible for the Tipperary minor team in 2008. He lined out at right wing-back when Tipperary suffered a 0–19 to 0–18 defeat by Cork in the Munster final on 13 July 2008.

On 14 July 2010, Barry made his first appearance for the Tipperary under-21 team. He lined out at right wing-back when Tipperary defeated Cork by 2–17 to 0-21. Barry was again at right wing-back when Tipperary faced Clare in the Munster final on 28 July 2010. He ended the game with a Munster Championship medal following the 1–22 to 1–17 victory. On 11 September 2010, Barry won an All-Ireland medal following Tipperary's 5–22 to 0–12 defeat of Galway in the final.

Barry was included on the Tipperary under-21 team for a second successive season in 2011. He played his last game in the grade on 15 July 2011 when he lined out at right wing-back in a 4–19 to 1–21 defeat by Cork.

==== Intermediate ====
Barry was drafted onto the Tipperary intermediate team for the 2012 Munster Championship. He made his first appearance for the team on 24 June 2012 when he lined out at right wing-back in a 3–18 to 2–16 defeat of Cork. Barry was again at right wing-back when Tipperary faced Clare in the Munster final on 25 July 2012. He ended the game with a winners' medal following the 1–18 to 0–17 victory. On 1 September 2012, Barry won an All-Ireland medal after lining out at right wing-back when Tipperary defeated Kilkenny by 3–13 to 1–17.

==== Senior ====
Barry was added to the Tipperary senior team in advance of the 2014 National League. He made his first appearance for the team on 23 March 2014 when he came on as a 39th-minute substitute for Michael Cahill at right wing-back in a 1–19 to 0–19 defeat of Dublin. On 4 May 2014, Barry was at right wing-back when Tipperary suffered a 2–25 to 1–27 defeat by Kilkenny in the National League final. He made his Munster Championship debut on 1 June 2014 when he played the full 70 minutes at right wing-back in a 2–18 to 2–16 defeat by Limerick. On 7 September 2014, Barry played in his first All-Ireland final against Kilkenny. He lined out full-back in the 1–28 to 3–22 draw with Kilkenny. Barry was switched to centre-back for the replay on 27 September 2014, however, he ended the game on the losing side following a 2-17 t 2–14 defeat.

On 12 July 2015, Barry lined out at full-back in his first Munster final. He ended the game with his first winners' medal following Tipperary's 0–21 to 0–16 defeat of Waterford. Barry ended the season by receiving an All-Star nomination.

On 10 July 2016, Barry started the Munster final against Waterford at full-back. He collected a second successive winners' medal following the 5–19 to 0–13 victory. Barry was again named at full-back for the All-Ireland final against Kilkenny on 4 September 2016. He ended the game with an All-Ireland medal following a 2–29 to 2–20 victory. Barrett ended the season by being named in the full-back position on the All-Star team.

On 23 April 2017, Barrett lined out at full-back when Tipperary faced Galway in the National League final. He ended the game on the losing side following a 3–21 to 0–14 defeat.

Barry played in a second successive National League final on 8 April 2018. Lining out at full-back he was substituted in the 60th minute after conceding 1–02 to his opponent Walter Walsh. Tipperary eventually lost the game to Kilkenny by 2–23 to 2–17.

On 30 June 2019, Barry lined out at full-back in his third Munster final when Tipperary faced Limerick. He was substituted by Barry Heffernan in the 62nd minute and ended the game on the losing side after a 2–26 to 2–14 defeat. Barry was dropped from the starting fifteen for the All-Ireland final against Kilkenny on 18 August 2019. He remained on the bench throughout but ended the game with a second All-Ireland medal after a 3–25 to 0–20 victory.

On 25 October 2019, Barry announced his retirement from inter-county hurling.

== Personal life ==
In May 2021, Barry announced that he underwent surgery for testicular cancer in April.

== Career statistics ==
Team	Year	National League			Munster		All-Ireland		Total	
Team	Year	Division	Apps	Score	Apps	Score	Apps	Score	Apps	Score
Tipperary	2014	Division 1A	4	0-01	1	0-00	6	0-00	11	0-01
Tipperary	2015	Division 1A	1	0-00	2	0-00	1	0-00	4	0-00
Tipperary	2016	Division 1A	3	0-00	3	0-00	2	0-00	8	0-00
Tipperary	2017	Division 1A	7	0-00	1	0-00	4	0-00	12	0-00
Tipperary	2018	Division 1A	6	0-00	0	0-00	—		6	0-00
Tipperary	2019	Division 1A	5	0-00	4	0-00	1	0-00	10	0-00
Career total			26	0-01	11	0-00	14	0-00	51	0-01

== Honours ==
Thurles CBS

- Dr. Croke Cup (1): 2009 (c)
- Dr. Harty Cup (1): 2009 (c)

University College Cork

- Fitzgibbon Cup (2): 2012, 2013

Tipperary

- All-Ireland Senior Hurling Championship (2): 2016, 2019
- Munster Senior Hurling Championship (2): 2015, 2016
- All-Ireland Intermediate Hurling Championship (1): 2012
- Munster Intermediate Hurling Championship (1): 2012
- All-Ireland Under-21 Hurling Championship (1): 2010
- Munster Under-21 Hurling Championship (1): 2010
- All-Ireland Minor Hurling Championship (1): 2007
- Munster Minor Hurling Championship (1): 2007

Individual

- All Star Award (1): 2016
