= Daire Quinn =

Irish hurler

Sport
- Sport: Hurling
- Position: Midfield
Club
- Years: Club
- Nenagh Éire Óg
Inter-county
Years	County	Apps (scores)
2016–	Tipperary	1 (0-0)
Inter-county titles
- Munster titles: 1
- All-Irelands: 1

Daire Quinn is an Irish sportsperson. He plays hurling with his local club Nenagh Éire Óg and with the Tipperary senior inter-county team since 2016.

== Career ==
Quinn was named in the Tipperary squad for the 2016 National Hurling League and made his league debut on 13 February against Dublin. He made his Championship debut for Tipperary on 19 June 2016 in the semi-final of the Munster Championship against Limerick when he came on as a substitute in the 3-12 to 1-16 victory in Semple Stadium, Thurles. He claimed his first Munster Senior Hurling Championship medal on 10 July 2016 as a non-playing substitute in the 5-19 to 0-13 demolition of Waterford in The Gaelic Grounds, Limerick.

=== Honours ===
Tipperary

- All-Ireland Senior Hurling Championship (1): 2016
- Munster Senior Hurling Championship (1): 2016

Nenagh Éire Óg

- North Tipperary Senior Hurling Championship (1): 2014

University Of Limerick

- Fitzgibbon Cup (1): 2015
