= Seán O'Brien (Tipperary hurler) =

Irish hurler

Sean O'Brien
Personal information
- Native name: Seán Ó Briain (Irish)
- Born: 1990 (age 35–36) Newport, County Tipperary, Ireland
- Occupation: Engineer

Sport
- Sport: Hurling
- Position: Left corner-back
Club
- Years: Club
- Newport
Club titles
- Tipperary titles: 0
College
- Years: College
- 2007-2012: University of Limerick
College titles
- Fitzgibbon titles: 0
Inter-county*
Years	County	Apps (scores)
2017-2020	Tipperary	9 (0-01)
Inter-county titles
- Munster titles: 0
- All-Irelands: 1
- NHL: 0
- All Stars: 0
- *Inter County team apps and scores correct as of 10:37, 21 November 2020.

Sean O'Brien (born 1990) is an Irish hurler who plays for Tipperary Championship club Newport and formerly at inter-county level with the Tipperary senior hurling team. He usually lines out as a left corner-back.

== Playing career ==
=== University of Limerick ===
O'Brien studied at the University of Limerick between 2007 and 2012 and joined the senior hurling team in his second year. He was a regular player in several Fitzgibbon Cup campaigns with the university.

=== Newport ===
O'Brien joined the Newport club at a young age and played in all grades at juvenile and underage levels. He eventually joined the club's top adult team in the Tipperary Intermediate Championship.

On 23 October 2016, O'Brien captained Newport in the Tipperary Intermediate Championship final against Thurles Sarsfields. He ended the game with a winners' medal following the 1–17 to 0–15 victory.

=== Tipperary ===
==== Minor and under-21 ====
O'Brien first played for Tipperary when he joined the minor team in advance of the 2007 Munster Championship. He made his first appearance for the team on 2 May 2007 when he lined out at right corner-back in a 3–12 to 1–11 defeat of Clare. O'Brien was switched to left corner-back when Tipperary faced Cork in the Munster final on 8 July 2007. He ended the game with a winners' medal following the 0–18 to 1–11 victory. On 2 September 2007, O'Brien won an All-Ireland medal from left corner-back following Tipperary's 4–14 to 2–11 defeat of Cork in the All-Ireland final.

O'Brien was again eligible for the Tipperary minor team in 2008. He was an unused substitute when Tipperary suffered a 0–19 to 0–18 defeat by Cork in the Munster final on 13 July 2008.

O'Brien was drafted onto the Tipperary under-21 team for the 2010 Munster Championship. He won a Munster Championship medal as a non-playing substitute on 28 July 2010 following Tipperary's 1–22 to 0–17 defeat of Cork in the final. On 11 September 2010, O'Brien won an All-Ireland medal from the substitutes' bench following Tipperary's 5–22 to 0–12 defeat of Galway in the All-Ireland final.

On 1 June 2011, O'Brien made his first appearance for the Tipperary under-21 team when he came on as a substitute for James Barry at centre-back in a 4–12 to 1–16 defeat of Waterford. He was switched to left corner-back for the 4–19 to 1–21 defeat by Cork on 15 July 2011.

==== Intermediate ====
O'Brien was added to the Tipperary intermediate panel for the 2010 Munster Championship. He was an unused substitute on 30 May 2010 when Tipperary suffered a 1–18 to 1–12 defeat by Cork at the quarter-final stage.

On 9 June 2013, O'Brien made his first appearance for the intermediate team when he lined out at right corner-back in a 0–20 to 0–15 defeat of Cork. He won a Munster Championship medal on 19 July 2013 following a 0–19 to 0–18 defeat of Cork in the Munster final. On 31 August 2013, O'Brien lined out at right corner-back when Tipperary faced Kilkenny in the All-Ireland final. He ended the game with a winners' medal following the 2–14 to 2–11 victory.

O'Brien was once again included on the intermediate team for the 2015 Munster Championship. He played his last game in the grade on 21 June 2015 when he lined out at right corner-back in 1–23 to 2–13 defeat by Limerick.

==== Senior ====
O'Brien was added to the Tipperary senior team in advance of the 2017 National League. He was an unused substitute on 23 April 2017 when Tipperary suffered a 3–21 to 0–14 defeat by Galway in the National League final. O'Brien made his first appearance for the team on 22 July when he came on as a 45th-minute substitute for James Barry in a 0–28 to 3–16 defeat of Clare in the All-Ireland quarter-final.

O'Brien announced his retirement from inter-county hurling on 11 December 2020.

== Career statistics ==
As of match played 21 November 2020

Team	Year	National League			Munster		All-Ireland		Total	
Team	Year	Division	Apps	Score	Apps	Score	Apps	Score	Apps	Score
Tipperary	2017	Division 1A	0	0-00	0	0-00	1	0-01	1	0-00
Tipperary	2018	Division 1A	5	0-00	4	0-00	—		9	0-00
Tipperary	2019	Division 1A	—		2	0-00	1	0-00	3	0-00
Tipperary	2020	Division 1A	4	0-00	1	0-00	—		5	0-00
Career total			9	0-00	7	0-00	2	0-01	18	0-01

== Honours ==
Newport

- Tipperary Intermediate Hurling Championship (1): 2016 (c)

Tipperary

- All-Ireland Senior Hurling Championship (1): 2019
- All-Ireland Intermediate Hurling Championship (1): 2013
- Munster Intermediate Hurling Championship (1): 2013
- All-Ireland Under-21 Hurling Championship (1): 2010
- Munster Under-21 Hurling Championship (1): 2010
- All-Ireland Minor Hurling Championship (1): 2007
- Munster Minor Hurling Championship (1): 2007
