= Michael Breen (hurler) =

Irish hurler

Personal information
- Native name: Mícheál Ó Braoin (Irish)
- Born: 16 July 1994 (age 32) Ballina, County Tipperary, Ireland
- Occupation: Secondary school teacher
- Height: 6 ft 2 in (188 cm)

Sport
- Sport: Hurling
- Position: Left corner-back
Club
- Years: Club
- 2011–: Ballina
Club titles
- Tipperary titles: 0
College
- Years: College
- 2013–2018: University College Cork
College titles
- Fitzgibbon titles: 0
Inter-county*
Years	County	Apps (scores)
2014–	Tipperary	42 (6-41)
Inter-county titles
- Munster titles: 2
- All-Irelands: 3
- NHL: 0
- All Stars: 0
- *Inter County team apps and scores correct as of match played 20 April 2025.

Michael Breen (born 16 July 1994) is an Irish hurler who plays for Tipperary Senior Championship club Ballina and at inter-county level with the Tipperary senior hurling team. While he usually lines out at midfield, Breen also plays in defence or attack.

== Playing career ==
=== Castletroy College ===
Breen first came to prominence as a hurler with Castletroy College in Limerick. He played in every grade of hurling before joining the college's senior hurling team and lined out in several Harty Cup campaigns.

=== University College Cork ===
As a student at University College Cork, Breen immediately became involved in hurling as a member of the university's freshers' team. He joined UCC's senior team in his second year and lined out in several Fitzgibbon Cup campaigns over a four-year period.

=== Ballina ===
Breen joined Ballina GAA club at a young age and played in all grades at juvenile and underage levels before eventually joining the club's top adult team in the Tipperary Intermediate Championship.

On 14 October 2012, Breen lined out at full-forward when Ballina faced Silvermines in the Tipperary Intermediate Championship final. He top-scored for the team with five points but ended on the losing side following a 2–21 to 0–10 victory.

Ballina qualified for a second successive final on 13 October 2013. Breen top scored with six points from centre-forward in the 3–12 to 0–20 defeat of Moyne-Templetuohy. He was again at centre-forward when Ballina faced Youghal in the Munster final on 17 November 2013. Breen scored four points all from placed balls in the 2–13 to 2–10 defeat.

=== Tipperary ===
==== Minor and under-21 ====
Breen first played for Tipperary as a member of the minor team during the 2011 Munster Championship. He was an unused substitute throughout the year.

On 2 May 2012, Breen made his first appearance for the team when he lined out at full-back in a 6–21 to 0–11 defeat of Kerry. He was again selected at full-back when Tipperary faced Clare in the Munster final on 15 July 2012. Breen ended the game with a winners' medal after a 1–16 to 1–12 victory. He again lined out at full-back when Tipperary drew 2–13 to 1–16 with Dublin in the All-Ireland final on 9 September 2012. Breen retained his position for the replay on 30 September 2012 and ended the game with an All-Ireland medal following the 2–18 to 1–11 victory.

Breen was drafted onto the Tipperary under-21 team in advance of the 2013 Munster Championship. He made his debut in that grade on 17 July 2013 when he lined out at left corner-back in a 5–19 to 2–13 defeat of Cork. On 7 August 2013, Breen lined out at right corner-back when Tipperary suffered a 1–17 to 2–10 defeat by Clare in the Munster final.

After three seasons with the under-21 team, Breen played his last game in the grade on 16 July 2015 in a 3–16 to 3–14 defeat by Limerick. On 3 October 2015, he was named in the left corner-back position on the Under-21 Team of the Year.

==== Senior ====
Breen was added to the Tipperary senior team in advance of the 2014 National League. He made his first appearance on 20 April 2014 when he came on as a 68th-minute substitute for James Woodlock in a 2–24 to 2–17 defeat of Clare. On 4 May 2014, Breen was an unused substitute when Tipperary suffered a 2–25 to 1–27 defeat by Kilkenny in the National League final.

On 12 July 2015, Breen was selected at left corner-back when Tipperary qualified to play Waterford in the Munster final. He scored a point from play and claimed his first Munster Championship medal following the 0–21 to 0–16 victory.

Maher became a midfielder during the 2016 season and lined out in that position in a second successive Munster final on 10 July 2016. He scored 1-01 from play and collected a second winners' medal after a 5–19 to 0–13 defeat of Waterford. On 5 September 2016, Breen was again selected at midfield when Tipperary faced Kilkenny in the All-Ireland final. He ended the game with an All-Ireland medal following a 2–29 to 2–20 victory.

On 23 April 2017, Breen lined out at centre-forward when Tipperary faced Galway in the National League final. He scored two points from play but ended the game on the losing side following a 3–21 to 0–14 defeat.

Breen played in a second successive National League final on 8 April 2018. Lining out at left corner-forward, he was held scoreless and ended the game on the losing side following a 2–23 to 2–17 defeat by Kilkenny.

On 30 June 2019, Breen lined out at midfield when Tipperary suffered a 2–26 to 2–14 defeat by Limerick in the Munster final. On 18 August 2019, he was selected at midfield when Tipperary faced Kilkenny in the All-Ireland final. Breen scored a point from play and ended the game with a second All-Ireland winners' medal following the 3–25 to 0–20 victory.

On 20 July in the 2025 All-Ireland final, Breen started at corner-back as Tipperary defeated Cork by 3–27 to 1-19 and claim a 29th All-Ireland title.

== Personal life ==
As of June 2025, Breen was working as a secondary school teacher at the CBS High School in Clonmel. Since 2025, Breen has been in a relationship with athlete Sharlene Mawdsley.

== Career statistics ==
As of match played 20 April 2025

Team	Year	National League			Munster		All-Ireland		Total	
Team	Year	Division	Apps	Score	Apps	Score	Apps	Score	Apps	Score
Tipperary	2014	Division 1A	1	0-00	0	0-00	0	0-00	1	0-00
Tipperary	2015	Division 1A	7	0-04	2	1-01	1	0-00	10	1-05
Tipperary	2016	Division 1A	6	1-11	3	3-02	2	0-03	11	4-16
Tipperary	2017	Division 1A	6	0-09	1	0-06	4	1-01	11	1-16
Tipperary	2018	Division 1A	8	3-16	1	0-00	—		9	3-16
Tipperary	2019	Division 1A	6	0-09	5	0-08	3	0-02	14	0-19
Tipperary	2020	Division 1A	5	0-03	1	0-01	2	0-07	8	0-11
Tipperary	2021	Division 1A	5	0-06	2	1-02	1	0-03	8	1-11
Tipperary	2022	Division 1A			4	0-03	—		4	0-03
Tipperary	2023	Division 1A			4	0-00	2	0-01	6	0-01
Tipperary	2024	Division 1A			3	0-01	—		3	0-01
Tipperary	2025	Division 1A			1	0-00				
Career total			44	4-58	27	5-24	15	1-17	85	10-99

== Honours ==
Ballina

- Tipperary Intermediate Hurling Championship (1): 2013

Tipperary

- All-Ireland Senior Hurling Championship (3): 2016, 2019, 2025
- Munster Senior Hurling Championship (2): 2015, 2016
- All-Ireland Minor Hurling Championship (1): 2012
- Munster Minor Hurling Championship (1): 2012
