= Andrew Coffey (hurler) =

Irish sportsperson

Sport
- Sport: Hurling
- Position: Half-Forward
Club
- Years: Club
- 2013-: Nenagh Éire Óg
Inter-county
Years	County	Apps (scores)
2016–	Tipperary	0 (0-0)

Andrew Coffey is an Irish sportsperson. He plays hurling with his local club Nenagh Éire Óg and with the Tipperary senior inter-county team since 2016.

== Career ==
Coffey was named in the Tipperary squad for the 2016 National Hurling League and made his league debut on 21 February against Kilkenny, when he came on as a late substitute.
