= 2016 All-Ireland Senior Hurling Championship final =

2016 All-Ireland Hurling Championship Final
- Event: 2016 All-Ireland Senior Hurling Championship
Kilkenny	Tipperary
2-20	2-29
- Date: 4 September 2016
- Venue: Croke Park, Dublin
- Man of the Match: Séamus Callanan
- Referee: Brian Gavin (Offaly)
- Weather: Partly Cloudy; 19 °C (66 °F)

The 2016 All-Ireland Senior Hurling Championship Final was the 129th event of its kind and the culmination of the 2016 All-Ireland Senior Hurling Championship. It was played at Croke Park in Dublin on 4 September 2016.

This was the 18th All-Ireland season that ended with a Kilkenny–Tipperary final. Of the previous 17, Tipperary won 10 and Kilkenny 7. It was also the fifth final between Tipperary and Kilkenny since 2009, with Kilkenny leading the series 3–1. Kilkenny were chasing three in a row with Tipperary looking for a first All-Ireland since 2010.

The final was shown live in Ireland on RTÉ One as part of The Sunday Game live programme, presented by Michael Lyster from Croke Park, with studio analysis from Liam Sheedy, Henry Shefflin and Ger Loughnane. Match commentary was provided by Ger Canning with analysis by Michael Duignan. The game was also shown live on Sky Sports, presented by Rachel Wyse and Brian Carney.

Tipperary clinched their 27th All-Ireland title winning on a 2-29 to 2-20 scoreline. Their victory also marked the first time since the 1960s that Tipperary had won multiple All-Ireland titles in a single decade, having only won one title each in the 1970s, 1980s, 1990s and 2000s.

== Background ==
This was the seventh time in eight years that the counties have played each other in the championship, with Kilkenny winning 5 times. Kilkenny went into the final having won 36 All Ireland titles, 11 titles in the last 15 years (2000, 2002, 2003, 2006, 2007, 2008, 2009, 2011, 2012, 2014, and 2015), with Tipperary on 26 titles, 2 titles over the same period (2001 and 2010).

The teams had played each other 26 times in the championship, the first time being in 1887, with Kilkenny winning 12 times and Tipperary winning on 13 occasions with one draw in 2014. Since the 2010 All-Ireland Final, Kilkenny have 10 wins and a draw in 13 league and championship games against Tipperary.

Kilkenny had played in 65 All-Ireland finals, winning 36, losing 25 and drawing 4, with Tipperary having appeared in 40 All-Ireland finals, winning 26, losing 12 and drawing 2.

The final was Kilkenny manager Brian Cody's 84th championship match as manager since taking over at the start of 1999 season. Kilkenny had won 68, drawn six and lost nine of the previous matches, the defeats being against Galway in 2001, 2005 and 2012, Cork in 1999, 2004 and 2013, Wexford in 2004, Tipperary in 2010 and Dublin in 2013. Tipperary were bidding to become the first Munster champions to win the All-Ireland title since Cork in 2005.

== Route to the final ==
=== Kilkenny ===
11 June 2016
19:00
Leinster Semi-final

Dublin	0-16 - 1-25	Kilkenny
D Treacy (0-11, 0-10 frees); D O’Callaghan (0-2); É Dillon, D Plunkett, P Ryan (0-1).	Report	TJ Reid (0-10, 0-7 frees, 0-1 ’65); JJ Farrell (1-5); C Buckley, W Walsh, M Fennelly (0-2); P Walsh, C Fogarty, L Ryan, C Fennelly (0-1).

O'Moore Park, Portlaoise
Attendance: 10,419
Referee: B Gavin (Offaly)
3 July 2016
16:00
Leinster Final

Kilkenny	1-26 - 0-22	Galway
TJ Reid 0-10 (0-7f, 1 65), J Farrell 1-4, R Hogan 0-5, C Fogarty 0-3, W Walsh 0-2, J Power 0-1, M Fennelly 0-1.	Report	J Canning 0-6 (0-6f), C Mannion 0-5, C Cooney 0-3, C Whelan 0-3, J Cooney 0-2, D Glennon 0-1, C Donnellan 0-1, A Smith 0-1.

Croke Park, Dublin
Attendance: 29,377
Referee: F. Horgan (Tipperary)
7 August 2016
15:30
All-Ireland Semi-final

Kilkenny	1-21 - 0-24	Waterford
TJ Reid 0-11 (0-10f, 0-1 ’65), W Walsh 1-1, R Hogan 0-4, C Fogarty 0-2, E Larkin, M Fennelly, C Fennelly 0-1 each.	Report	Pauric Mahony 0-14 (0-10f, 0-1 ’65), A Gleeson 0-5, J Dillon 0-2, K Moran, P Curran, M Shanahan 0-1 each.

Croke Park, Dublin
Attendance: 34,432
Referee: J Owens (Wexford)
13 August 2016
18:45
All-Ireland Semi-final replay

Kilkenny	2-19 - 2-17	Waterford
C Fennelly 2-1, TJ Reid 0-7 (6fs), R Hogan 0-4, L Blanchfield 0-3, P Walsh 0-2, E Larkin 0-1, W Walsh 0-1.	Report	Pauric Mahony 0-9 (7fs), A Gleeson 1-2, J Dillon 1-0, Shane Bennett 0-2, J Barron 0-2, M Shanahan 0-2.

Semple Stadium, Thurles
Attendance: 30,058
Referee: James McGrath (Westmeath)

=== Tipperary ===
22 May 2016
16:00
Munster Quarter-final

Tipperary	0-22 - 0-13	Cork
S Callanan 0-8 (4f), J O’Dwyer 0-7 (2f, 1 65), N McGrath 0-2, Pádraic Maher, B Maher, J McGrath, J Forde & K Bergin 0-1 each.	Report	P Horgan 0-4f, A Cadogan 0-3, C Lehane 0-2 (1f), C Murphy, B Lawton, S Harnedy & L O’Farrell 0-1 each.

Semple Stadium, Thurles
Attendance: 29,114
Referee: B Kelly (Westmeath)
19 June 2016
16:00
Munster Semi-final

Tipperary	3-12 - 1-16	Limerick
S Callanan (1-6, 0-3 frees, 0-2 65s); M Breen (2-1); N McGrath (0-3); J McGrath, Pádraic Maher (0-1 each).	Report	S Dowling (0-9, 8 frees); T Morrissey (1-0); D Hannon (0-2); B Nash, C Lynch, G Hegarty, J Ryan, J Fitzgibbon (0-1 each).

Semple Stadium, Thurles
Attendance: 25,531
Referee: J McGrath (Westmeath)
10 July 2016
16:00
Munster Final

Waterford	0-13 - 5-19	Tipperary
Pauric Mahony (0-6, 4 frees); P. Curran (0-5, 3 frees); A. Gleeson (0-2, sidelines)	Report	S. Callanan (1-11, 8 frees, 1 65); J. McGrath (3-2, 1-0 pen); M. Breen (1-1); Pádraic Maher, N. McGrath, Patrick Maher, J. Forde, A. McCormack (0-1 each)

Gaelic Grounds, Limerick
Attendance: 26,508
Referee: Brian Gavin (Offaly)
14 August 2016
15:30
All-Ireland Semi-final

Tipperary	2-19 - 2-18	Galway
S Callanan 0-9 (0-8f, 0-1 ’65), J McGrath 1-1, J O'Dwyer 1-0, N McGrath, M Breen 0-3 each, R Maher, P Maher, B Maher 0-1 each.	Report	C Cooney 1-7 (0-5f), J Canning 0-5 (0-3f, 0-1 ’65), J Cooney 1-1, C Whelan 0-2, S Mlaoney, D Burke, J Flynn 0-1 each.

Croke Park, Dublin
Attendance: 54,227
Referee: B Kelly (Westmeath)

== Pre-match ==
=== Jubilee team ===
The Tipperary team that won the 1991 All-Ireland Final was presented to the crowd before the match to mark 25 years. Tipperary manager Michael Ryan who played on that team was represented by his mother for the presentation.

=== Ticketing ===
With a stadium capacity of 82,300, the 32 individual county boards will receive 60,000 tickets. Schools and third level colleges will get 2,500 tickets, while season ticket holders will be entitled to 5,500 tickets. 1,000 tickets will be given to overseas clubs. The Camogie, Ladies' Football, Handball and Rounders Associations are each allocated about 200 tickets, as are the jubilee teams and mini-7s which play at half-time. The match was a sell-out.

=== Related events ===
The 2016 All-Ireland Minor Hurling Final was played between Tipperary and Limerick as a curtain-raiser to the senior final. Tipperary went on to win the final on a 1–21 to 0-17 scoreline. The Tipperary minor team were captained by Brian McGrath, brother of Noel and John McGrath who went to win the senior final with Tipperary.

== Match summary ==
=== Officials ===
On 22 August 2016 the officials were chosen for the final by the GAA, with Brian Gavin being named as the referee. Barry Kelly was the standby referee with Colm Lyons of Cork the other linesman and John Keane of Galway the sideline official. The umpires were Michael Gavin, David Gavin, William Flynn, all from Clara and PJ Lawlor from Ferbane/Belmont. The match was his fourth All-Ireland final having been the referee in 2011, 2013, and the replay in 2014.

=== Team news ===
It was confirmed on 15 August that Kilkenny's Michael Fennelly would miss the final after he ruptured his achilles tendon in the semi-final replay victory over Waterford. Kilkenny named their starting fifteen on Friday 2 September and it showed two changes to the one which defeated Waterford in the semi-final replay with Kevin Kelly included at corner-forward. The other change saw Kieran Joyce replacing Michael Fennelly. Michael Ryan made one change to the Tipperary team for the final with John O’Dwyer coming in at top of the right instead of Nial O Meara with John McGrath moving to top of the left. There were five All-Ireland Final debutants in Tipperary's starting line-up.

=== Summary ===
Seamus Callanan opened the scoring after two minutes with a point from out on the left which he hit over his left shoulder. Kevin Kelly equalized for Kilkenny in the fifth minute before TJ Reid scored from a free to put Kilkenny into a one-point lead. After ten minutes, Séamus Kennedy scored his first ever championship point to make it four points all, after fifteen minutes it was six all. John O’Dwyer scored a point after twenty five minutes to level the scores at nine all. The half-time score was Tipperary 0-14 Kilkenny 0–12 with every single Tipperary forward scoring from play. The sides were level 10 times in the first half.

Seamus Callinan had five points in the first half and scored the first point of the second half from a free to open the lead to three points. After forty-one minutes, Kevin Kelly scored a goal for Kilkenny when he scoped and flicked the ball into the empty net in front of the hill 16 end. Seamus Callinan got the next score from a free to put one point between them. Jason Forde who had come on as a substitute a minute earlier for Michael Breen scored a point to level the game in the forty fifth minute. Two minutes later John O’Dwyer picked up the ball and cut in from the left and hit a low shot from distance that flew into the back of the net to put Tipperary into a four-point lead. Pauric Maher scored a point from out on the left touchline in the fifty-first minute to increase the lead to five. Tipperary were six ahead in the fifty-sixth minute after another Seamus Callinan point. With ten minutes left John McGrath scored a second goal for Tipperary when he cut in from the right and hit a high shot to the left after a pass from Noel McGrath, this put Tipperary nine points clear. Two minutes later Richie Hogan scored with a ground shot to the net to reduce the lead to six. Tipperary then scored a further four points to go into stoppage time with a nine-point lead which they held to the end to claim the title.

== Match details ==
4 September 2016
15:30

Kilkenny	2-20 - 2-29	Tipperary
TJ Reid 0-11 (10f, 1'65), K Kelly 1-2 (0-1 sideline), R Hogan 1-1, P Walsh, E Larkin 0-2 each, W Walsh, C Buckley 0-1 each.	Report	S Callanan 0-13 (3f, 1'65'), J O'Dwyer 1-5 (0-1f, 0-1 sideline), J McGrath 1-3, J Forde, Patrick Maher 0-2 each, N McGrath, S Kennedy, D McCormack, Padraic Maher 0-1 each.

Croke Park, Dublin
Attendance: 82,016
Referee: Brian Gavin

Kilkenny	Tipperary

1	Eoin Murphy
2	Paul Murphy
3	Joey Holden
4	Shane Prendergast (captain)
5	Pádraig Walsh
6	Kieran Joyce
7	Cillian Buckley
8	T. J. Reid
9	Conor Fogarty
10	Walter Walsh
11	Richie Hogan
12	Eoin Larkin
13	Kevin Kelly
14	Colin Fennelly
15	Liam Blanchfield
Substitutes:
18	Rob Lennon for K. Joyce (60 mins)
21	Lester Ryan for E. Larkin (60 mins)
Manager:
Brian Cody

1	Darren Gleeson
2	Cathal Barrett
3	James Barry
4	Michael Cahill
5	Séamus Kennedy
6	Ronan Maher
7	Pádraic Maher
8	Brendan Maher (captain)
9	Michael Breen
10	Dan McCormack
11	Patrick Maher
12	Noel McGrath
13	John O'Dwyer
14	Séamus Callinan
15	John McGrath
Substitutes:
19	Jason Forde for M. Breen (45 mins)
25	Niall O'Meara for D. McCormack (62 mins)
22	Donagh Maher for M. Cahill (65 mins)
17	Kieran Bergin for N. McGrath (70 mins)
20	Thomas Hamill for S. Kennedy (72 mins)
Manager:
Michael Ryan

Man of the Match:
Séamus Callanan

Linesmen:
Barry Kelly (Westmeath)
Colm Lyons (Cork)

Sideline Official
John Keane (Galway)

Umpires
Michael Gavin
David Gavin
William Flynn
PJ Lawlor

=== Trophy presentation ===
Tipperary captain Brendan Maher accepted the Liam MacCarthy Cup from GAA president Aogán Ó Fearghail in the Hogan Stand. The Tipperary team then did a victory lap around Croke Park with the trophy.

=== Reaction ===
Tipperary manager Michel Ryan speaking after the match said "This is a fantastic day for Tipperary hurling. I think we might have awoken other giants that may have been sleeping though, in that every other county is going to take huge encouragement from what we’ve achieved this year, because we’re all in the pot; every one of us hurling counties are chasing Kilkenny and those are the facts. And for one of us to come through and break that mould for once... don’t get me wrong, that’s not a foregone conclusion that that will ever happen again, such is the quality of Kilkenny, but I think we’re after sending home a lot of teams that I think will set 2017 alight.”

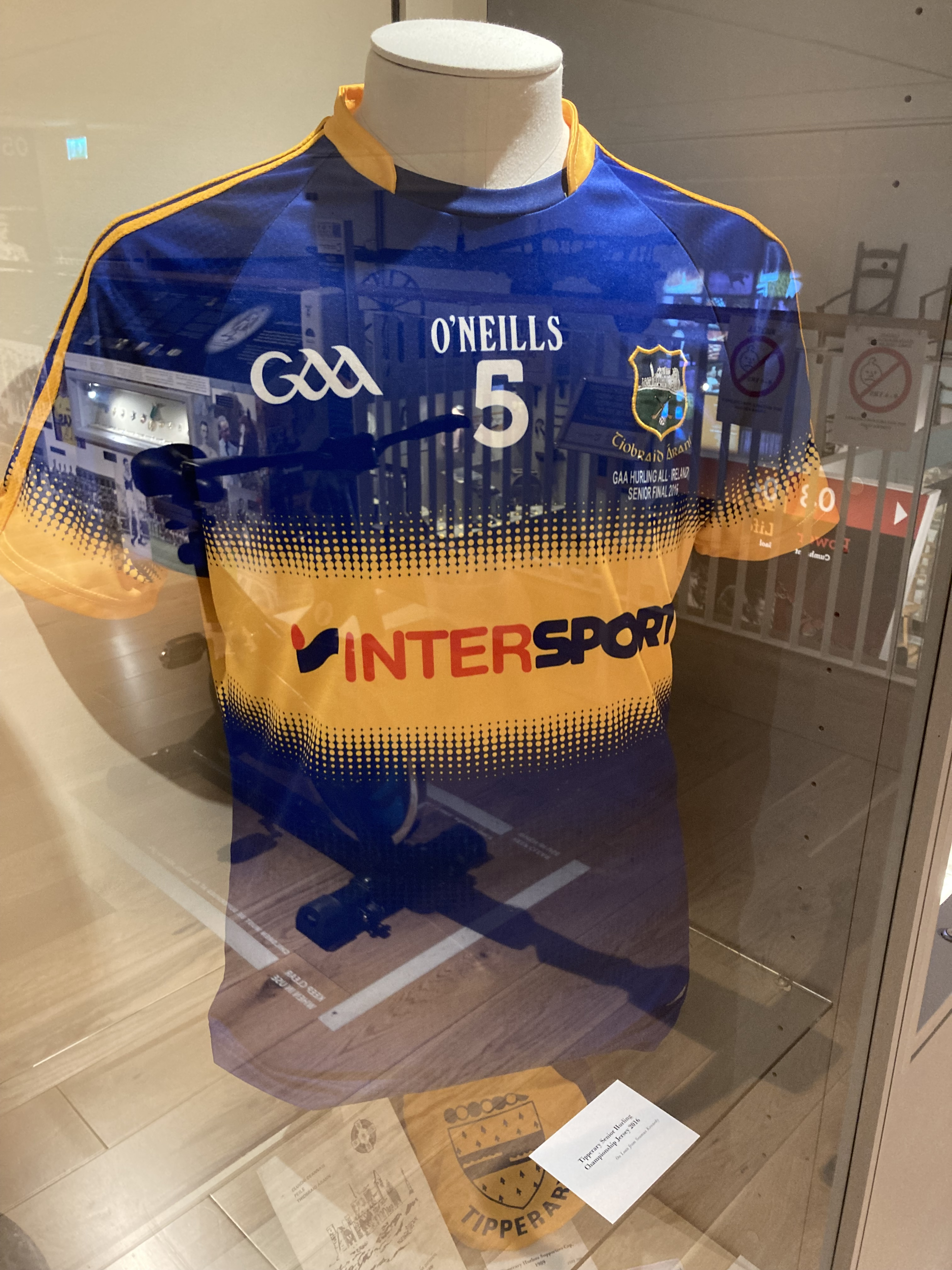
Shirt worn by Séamus Kennedy in the 2016 All-Ireland final (Tipperary Museum of Hidden History)

Kilkenny manager Brian Cody speaking after the match said "The better team won, the better team always wins as far as I’m concerned but it was comprehensive, We went in after the first half two points down, well in the game. We got a good start to the second half, got the goal but you know they didn’t blink, they came back at us and they got some terrific scores, We were out-played through the second half and there’s no argument that the better team won the match."

Noel McGrath said it was the stuff of dreams to come back from cancer and win the All-Ireland title saying "Fifteen months ago I never thought I'd be playing in Croke Park, let alone going up the steps at Croke Park, or watching Brendan (Maher) lift up the cup. It was tough for me for a few months in 2015, but look I'm just delighted to be back playing and delighted to be on the pitch and doing what I can for Tipperary and I'm just absolutely thrilled to be part of an All-Ireland-winning team. I was just delighted to be able to get back playing to whatever level I could get back to - I wasn't sure what that would be."

Former Tipperary hurler and manager Nicky English writing in the Irish Times taught that Tipperary out-Kilkennyed Kilkenny this time to emerge as very deserving and worthy winners of this All-Ireland final saying "This was a huge win for Tipperary – there’s no other way to put it. Huge! Tipperary’s strength in the first tackle, their aerial ability throughout, their skill in the forwards and their intensity was reminiscent of Kilkenny at their level best, which should be taken as a serious compliment. From Mick Ryan and his management team’s perspective, they couldn’t have asked for any more from the players. In terms of power, aggression, skill and intelligent hurling, Tipperary were fantastic."

Highlights of the final were shown on The Sunday Game programme which aired at 9:30pm that night on RTÉ Two and was presented by Des Cahill with match analysis from Brendan Cummins, Eddie Brennan, and Cyril Farrell. On the man of the match award shortlist were John O'Dwyer, Ronan Maher, and Seamus Callanan, with Seamus Callanan winning the award which was presented by GAA president Aogán Ó Fearghail at the Double tree by Hilton hotel in Dublin where the post match Tipperary function was being held. Tipperary manager Michael Ryan opened the envelope that contained the winning players name.

=== Celebrations ===
The Tipperary team returned home on the 5 September were the homecoming event was held at Semple Stadium in Thurles. The gates of the Stadium were opened at 4.00pm with the Tipperary senior team were introduced to the crowd at 8.00pm, preceded by the minor squad, who helped the county to their first minor-senior double since 1949.

== Miscellaneous ==
- Sides were level 11 times (equalling the all-time record from 2009 and the 2014 drawn match).
- Kilkenny were in the lead on seven occasions, equal to Tipperary's record in 2009.
