= Dan McCormack (hurler) =

Irish hurler (born 1993)

Personal information
- Native name: Dónall Mac Cormaic (Irish)
- Nickname: Pigeon
- Born: 28 January 1993 (age 33) Mount George, Borrisoleigh, County Tipperary, Ireland
- Occupation: Secondary school teacher
- Height: 6 ft 0 in (183 cm)

Sport
- Sport: Hurling
- Position: Right wing-forward
Club
- Years: Club
- 2010-present: Borris–Ileigh
Club titles
- Tipperary titles: 1
- Munster titles: 1
College
- Years: College
- University College Cork
College titles
- Fitzgibbon titles: 2
Inter-county*
Years	County	Apps (scores)
2015-2024	Tipperary	32 (1-16)
Inter-county titles
- Munster titles: 2
- All-Irelands: 2
- NHL: 0
- All Stars: 0
- *Inter County team apps and scores correct as of match played 22 May 2022.

Daniel McCormack (born 28 January 1993) is an Irish hurler who plays for Tipperary Senior Championship club Borris–Ileigh and previously at inter-county level with the Tipperary senior hurling team. He usually lines out as a right wing-forward. McCormack credits Michael J Patterson as crucial to his career development.

== Playing career ==
=== Our Lady's Secondary School ===
McCormack first came to prominence as a hurler with Our Lady's Secondary School in Templemore. He played in every grade before eventually joining the senior hurling team and lined out in several Harty Cup campaigns.

=== University College Cork and Fantane University ===
During his studies at University College Cork, McCormack joined the university's senior hurling team during his second year. On 3 March 2012, he lined out at centre-forward when University College Cork defeated the Cork Institute of Technology by 2–15 to 2–14 to win the Fitzgibbon Cup.

On 2 March 2013, McCormack again lined out at centre-forward in a second consecutive Fitzgibbon Cup final. He ended the game with a second winners' medal after scoring a point from play in the 2–17 to 2–12 defeat of Mary Immaculate College.

=== Borris-Ileigh ===
McCormack joined the Borris–Ileigh club at a young age and played at all grades in juvenile and underage levels. He eventually joined the club's senior team that contested the North Tipperary Championship.

On 2 September 2017, McCormack lined out at right wing-forward when Borris-Ileigh faced Nenagh Éire Óg in the North Tipperary Championship final. He scored three points from play and ended the game with a winners' medal following the 2–19 to 0–18 victory. On 8 October 2017, McCormack was switched to centre-forward when Borris–Ileigh lined out against Thurles Sarsfields in the Tipperary Senior Championship final. He scored three points from play in the 1–24 to 0–11 defeat.

On 3 November 2019, McCormack was at midfield when Borris–Ileigh faced Kiladangan in the Tipperary Senior Championship final. He scored a point from play and collected a winners' medal following the 1–15 to 1–12 victory.

=== Tipperary ===
==== Minor and under-21 ====
McCormack first lined out for Tipperary as a member of the minor team during the 2009 Munster Championship. On 12 July 2009, he was an unused substitute when Tipperary suffered an 0–18 to 1–13 defeat by Waterford in the Munster final. McCormack made his first appearance for the team on 9 August 2009 when he lined out in goal in Tipperary's 1–21 to 2–16 defeat by Kilkenny in the All-Ireland semi-final.

After an early exit from the 2010 Munster Championship, McCormack was again eligible for the Tipperary minor team in 2011. His minor career ended with a 3–13 to 1–13 defeat by Clare on 24 June 2011.

McCormack was drafted onto the Tipperary under-21 team in advance of the 2012 Munster Championship. He made his first appearance for the team on 6 June 2012 when he lined out at midfield in an 0–18 to 0–17 defeat of Cork. McCormack was again at midfield when Tipperary suffered a 1–16 to 1–14 defeat by Clare in the Munster final on 8 August 2012.

On 7 August 2013, Tipperary lined out in a second successive Munster final against Clare. McCormack was selected on the bench and remained as a n unused substitute for the 1–17 to 2–10 defeat.

McCormack was eligible for the under-21 grade for a third successive season in 2014 and returned to the starting fifteen. He made his last appearance in the grade on 16 July 2014 when he scored two points from left wing-forward in a 5–19 to 1-25 extra-time defeat by Clare.

==== Senior ====
McCormack was added to the Tipperary senior team in advance of the 2015 National League and was an unused substitute throughout the campaign. On 12 July 2015, he was selected on the bench when Tipperary faced Waterford in the Munster final. McCormack remained as an unused substitute but ended the game with a Munster Championship medal following the 0–21 to 0–16 victory.

On 13 February 2016, McCormack made his first appearance for the Tipperary senior team when he lined out at right wing-forward in a 1–23 to 0–12 defeat of Dublin in the National League. He claimed a second successive Munster Championship medal on 10 July 2016 - his first on the field of play - after lining out at right wing-forward in a 5–19 to 0–13 defeat of Waterford in the final. On 5 September 2016, McCormack was again selected at right wing-forward for Tipperary's All-Ireland final meeting with Kilkenny. He ended the game with an All-Ireland medal after the 2–29 to 2–20 victory.

On 23 April 2017, McCormack lined out in his first National League final. He was held scoreless at right wing-forward and ended the game on the losing side following a 3–21 to 0–14 victory for Galway.

On 30 June 2019, McCormack scored a point from left wing-forward when Tipperary suffered a 2–26 to 2–14 defeat by Limerick in the Munster final. On 18 August 2019, he was selected at right wing-forward when Tipperary faced Kilkenny in the All-Ireland final. McCormack ended the game with a second All-Ireland winners' medal following the 3–25 to 0–20 victory.

On 17 October 2024, McCormack announced his retirement from inter-county hurling.

== Career statistics ==
As of match played 22 May 2022

Team	Year	National League			Munster		All-Ireland		Total	
Team	Year	Division	Apps	Score	Apps	Score	Apps	Score	Apps	Score
Tipperary	2015	Division 1A	0	0-00	0	0-00	0	0-00	0	0-00
Tipperary	2016	Division 1A	6	0-02	3	0-01	2	0-01	11	0-04
Tipperary	2017	Division 1A	7	0-09	1	0-03	4	0-01	12	0-13
Tipperary	2018	Division 1A	2	0-00	4	1-00	—		6	1-00
Tipperary	2019	Division 1A	2	0-00	5	0-01	3	0-00	10	0-01
Tipperary	2020	Division 1A	0	0-00	1	0-00	2	0-04	3	0-04
Tipperary	2021	Division 1A	4	0-02	2	0-03	1	0-00	7	0-05
Tipperary	2022	Division 1A	4	0-00	4	0-02	—		8	0-02
Career total			25	0-13	20	1-10	12	0-06	57	1-29

== Honours ==
Borris–Ileigh

- Munster Senior Club Hurling Championship (1): 2019
- Tipperary Senior Hurling Championship (1): 2019
- All-Ireland Mini 7s Championship (1): 2015
- North Tipperary Senior Hurling Championship (1): 2017

University College Cork

- Fitzgibbon Cup (2) : 2012, 2013

Tipperary

- All-Ireland Senior Hurling Championship (2): 2016, 2019
- Munster Senior Hurling Championship (2): 2015, 2016
