= Brian Gavin =

Irish hurling referee

Brian Gavin (born 13 July 1977) is an Irish hurling referee.

== Career ==
A native of Clara, County Offaly, Gavin is one of the sport's top referees and officiated at All-Ireland finals in minor, under-21, and the senior final in 2011.

In 2013, he took charge of his second senior final after previously taken charge of the 2011 Final, and also the All-Ireland championship final at minor level in 2004 and under-21 level in 2006. His performance in the 2013 Final was a source of controversy as he played over the time added on thus allowing Clare to score a point to draw the game.

During the 2011 All-Ireland Senior Final, Gavin was accidentally hit by the swinging Hurley of Kilkenny's Tommy Walsh and sustained a nose injury.

Gavin was named as the referee for the 2014 All-Ireland Final replay on 10 September.

Gavin was also named as the referee for the 2016 All-Ireland Final.

In January 2018, Gavin announced his retirement from inter-county refereeing.

Brian Gavin was involved in a number of other incidents during his career. In the 2006 All Ireland Hurling Semi Final between Cork and Waterford he awarded Waterford a very controversial free in the 72 second minute which if scored would have drawn the game. In 2007 in the All Ireland Quarter Final between the same counties he awarded Waterford a penalty in the last minute when he adjudged Cork goalkeeper Donal Óg Cusack to be lying on the sliotar. Replays showed he was clearly pushed by the defender. In 2015 Gavin himself was sent off during a club game in Offaly. His suspension was overturned on appeal which was followed by the resignation of the referee who had issued the red card.
