= Kieran Bergin =

Irish sportsperson

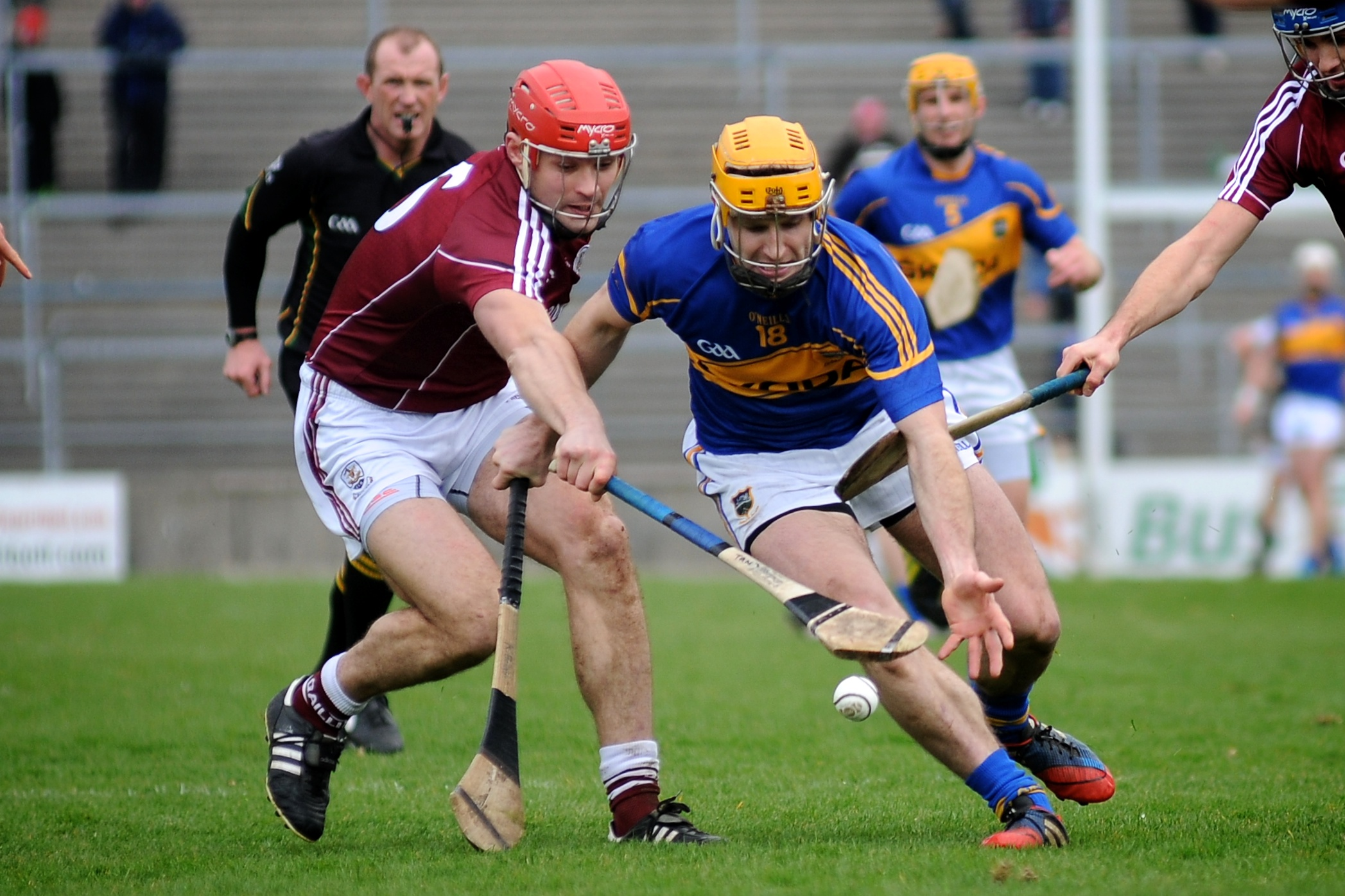
- Kieran Bergin (on the right, with the number "18") in action for Tipperary against Galway's Iarla Tannian (left) in 2014

Personal information
- Native name: Ciarán Ó Beirgín (Irish)
- Born: 25 January 1986 (age 40) Clonmel, Ireland
- Occupation: Student

Sport
- Sport: Hurling
- Position: Left half back
Club
- Years: Club
- 2003-: Killenaule
Inter-county
Years	County	Apps (scores)
2013-2017 (Hurling)	Tipperary	10 (0-7)
Inter-county titles
- Munster titles: 2
- All-Irelands: 1

Kieran Bergin (born 23 January 1986) is an Irish sportsperson. He plays hurling with his local club Clonmel Óg and with the Tipperary senior inter-county team since 2013. Bergin is a nephew of Jack Bergin, who was a Tipperary selector when they won the All-Ireland title in 2001, he is also a first cousin of former Galway Footballer Joe Bergin. Bergin has also played with the Tipperary senior football team and was part of the panel for the 2013 McGrath Cup. Bergin went to the United States to live in 2005 and spent five years living in New York City and two years in San Francisco before returning to Ireland in 2012.

== Career ==
Bergin previously played minor hurling with Tipperary in 2003 and 2004 and won a Munster Minor Hurling Championship medal in 2003 from the midfield position. He played for Dublin IT in the 2013 Fitzgibbon Cup where they reached the quarter-finals before losing to Mary Immaculate College.

He joined the Tipperary hurling panel in April 2013 and made his senior debut on 5 May 2013, starting at right half back in the 0–20 to 2–17 2013 National Hurling League final defeat to Kilkenny at Nowlan Park.

On 9 June 2013, he made his championship debut aged 27, starting at right half back against Limerick in a 1–18 to 1–15 defeat.

On 4 September 2016, Bergin came on as a second-half substitute and won his first All-Ireland Senior hurling title when Tipperary defeated Kilkenny in the final by 2–29 to 2-20.

In April 2017, Bergin withdrew from the Tipperary hurling panel due to work commitments. On 11 May 2017, Bergin joined the Tipperary Senior football panel.

== Honours ==
- All-Ireland Senior Hurling Championship:
  - Winner (1): 2016
- Munster Senior Hurling Championship:
  - Winner (2): 2015, 2016
- Munster Minor Hurling Championship:
  - Winner (1): 2003
  - Runner-up (1): 2004
- Munster Under-21 Hurling Championship:
  - Runner-up (1): 2005
