= Joe Gallagher (hurler) =

Irish hurler

Sport
- Sport: Hurling
- Position: Midfield
Club
- Years: Club
- Kildangan
Inter-county
| Years | County | Apps (scores) |
| 2016– | Tipperary | 0 (0-0) |

Joe Gallagher is an Irish sportsperson. He plays hurling with his local club Kildangan and with the Tipperary senior inter-county team since 2016.

== Career ==
Gallagher was named in the Tipperary squad for the 2016 National Hurling League and made his league debut on 13 February against Dublin when he came on as a substitute.

== Honours ==
Tipperary

- All-Ireland Intermediate Hurling Championship (1): 2012
- Munster Under-21 Hurling Championship (1): 2010
- All-Ireland Under-21 Hurling Championship (1): 2010
- All-Ireland Minor Hurling Championship (1): 2007
- Munster Minor Hurling Championship (1): 2007
