= Bill Gibbins =

British businessman (1872–1956)

- Born: William C. Gibbins; 1872; Liverpool
- Died: 1956 (aged 83–84); Bootle
- Other names: W.C. Gibbins

William Gibbins (1872–1956) is a former chairman of Everton. He presided over the club between 1940 and 1947, and was on the Board from 1920 to 1953. He was also actively involved with the Liverpool County Football Association. He died at his home in Bootle on 22 September 1956.

He is credited with introducing baseball to Goodison Park.
