= Rob Lennon =

Irish hurler

Robert Lennon
Personal information
- Native name: Riobeard Ó Leannáin (Irish)
- Born: 1993 (age 32–33) Bennettsbridge, County Kilkenny, Ireland
- Height: 6 ft 3 in (191 cm)

Sport
- Sport: Hurling
- Position: Right corner-back
Club
- Years: Club
- Bennettsbridge
Club titles
- Kilkenny titles: 0
College
- Years: College
- Dublin City University
Inter-county*
Years	County	Apps (scores)
2015-	Kilkenny	1 (0-00)
Inter-county titles
- Leinster titles: 1
- All-Irelands: 1
- NHL: 0
- All Stars: 0
- *Inter County team apps and scores correct as of 15:35, 19 November 2016.

Robert Lennon (born 1993) is an Irish hurler who currently plays as a right corner-back for the Kilkenny senior team.

Born in Bennettsbridge, County Kilkenny, Lennon first played competitive hurling in his youth. He enjoyed All-Ireland successes at colleges level with St. Kieran's College. An All-Ireland medallist in the junior grade with Bennettsbridge, Lennon has also won one Leinster medal and one championship medal.

Lennon made his debut on the inter-county scene at the age of seventeen when he first linked up with the Kilkenny minor team. An All-Ireland winner in this grade as a substitute, he was later an All-Ireland runner-up with the under-21 team. Lennon made his senior debut during the 2015 league.

== Honours ==
=== Team ===
St. Kieran's College

- All-Ireland Colleges Senior Hurling Championship (2): 2010, 2011
- Leinster Colleges Senior Hurling Championship (2): 2010, 2011

Bennettsbridge

- All-Ireland Junior Club Hurling Championship (1): 2015 (c)
- Leinster Junior Club Hurling Championship (1): 2014 (c)
- Kilkenny Junior Hurling Championship (1): 2014 (c)

Kilkenny

- Leinster Senior Hurling Championship (1): 2015 (sub)
- Leinster Under-21 Hurling Championship (1): 2012 (sub)
- All-Ireland Minor Hurling Championship (1): 2010 (sub)
- Leinster Minor Hurling Championship (1): 2010 (sub)

Achievements
Preceded by Stephen Colgan (Kickhams Creggan)	All-Ireland Junior Club Hurling Final winning captain 2015	Succeeded by Incumbent
