= 2019 Tipperary county hurling team season =

- Team: Tipperary county
- Manager: Liam Sheedy
- Captain: Séamus Callanan
- All-Ireland SHC: Winners
- Munster SHC: Finalists
- National League: Quarter-Finals
- Top scorer Championship: Jason Forde (2-67)
- Highest SHC attendance: 82,260 (v Kilkenny 18 August)
- Lowest SHC attendance: Clare (v 18,316 2 June)
- Standard Kit

The 2019 season was Liam Sheedy's first year in charge since returning as manager of the Tipperary senior hurling team, having been previously in charge from 2008 to 2010.

The team were sponsored by world leading CEO advisory firm Teneo for the first year in a deal worth up to €180,000 a year on a rolling 12-month contract.

On 24 September 2018, Liam Sheedy was appointed as the new manager of the Tipperary senior hurling team on a three-year term. In October 2018, Tommy Dunne was named as the coach of the senior hurlers with Darragh Egan also added to the back-room team as goalkeeping coach. Paddy O’Brien (physio) and Cairbre O Caireallan (strength and conditioning) were also named in October as part of Sheedy’s management team.

On 3 November 2018, a Tipperary XV played a Kilkenny selection in a charity match to raise money for Amanda Stapleton, the sister of former Tipperary All-Ireland winner Paddy Stapleton, who was diagnosed with an inoperable brain tumour.

On 13 November 2018, Sheedy announced a 40-man pre-season training squad which contained 12 players from the 2018 All-Ireland Under 21 Championship winning team. Training began on the weekend of 17 November.

On 22 January 2019, Séamus Callanan was named as the new captain of the Tipperary senior hurling team for 2019 with Noel McGrath named also as vice-captain.

On 20 February it was announced that former manager Eamon O'Shea would be joining the backroom team in a support role at the end of the National Hurling League.

In early May it was announced that former captain Eoin Kelly had also joined the back-room team.

== 2019 senior hurling management team ==
| Name | Position | Club |
| Liam Sheedy | Manager | Portroe |
| Tommy Dunne | Coach | Toomevara |
| Darragh Egan | Coach | Kildangan |

2019 Tipperary Senior Hurling Management Team

Manager

- Liam Sheedy (Portroe)

Coach-Selectors

- Tommy Dunne (Toomevara)
- Darragh Egan (Kiladangan)

Additional Coaches

- Eamonn O’Shea (Kilruane MacDonagh’s)

Goalkeeping Coach

- Darren Gleeson (Portroe)

Strength & Conditioning Coaches

- Caibre Ó Caireallain (Antrim)
- Diarmaid Carr (Golden-Kilfeacle)

Nutritionist

- Gary Sweeney (Dublin)

Performance Analysis

- Damien Young (Drom & Inch)
- Finn Briody (Holycross-Ballycahill)
- Seán Flynn (Burgess)
- Ray Boyne (Dublin)
- Conor Boyne (Dublin)
- Darragh Boyne (Dublin)

Logistics Manager

- Liam O’Shea (Kilruane MacDonagh’s)

Kitmen

- Brian Stakelum (Thurles Sarsfields)
- John Sheedy (Portroe)

Doctor

- Brendan Murphy (Offaly)

Physiotherapist

- Paddy O’Brien (Toomevara)

Masseurs

- Mick Clohessy (Borris-Ileigh)
- Declan Maher (Borris-Ileigh)

Team Liaison Officer

- John Smith (Thurles Sarsfields)

County Board Chairman

- John Devane (Boherlahan-Dualla)

County Board Secretary

- Tim Floyd (Newport)

Public Relations Officer

- Joe Bracken (Moycarkey-Borris)

=== 2019 squad ===
Below was the 40 man pre-season training squad announced in November 2018.

Cathal Barrett (Holycross-Ballycahill); James Barry (Upperchurch-Drombane); Michael Breen (Ballina); Ger Browne (Knockavilla-Donaskeigh Kickhams); Robert Byrne (Portroe); Paddy Cadell (JK Brackens); Jerome Cahill (Kilruane MacDonaghs); Seamus Callanan (Drom & Inch); Willie Connors (Kiladangan); Cian Darcy (Kilruane MacDonaghs); Colin English (Fr. Sheehy’s); Alan Flynn (Kiladangan); Jason Forde (Silvermines); Tom Fox (Éire Óg Annacarty-Donohill); Conor Hammersley (Clonoulty-Rossmore); Barry Heffernan (Nenagh Éire Óg); Barry Hogan (Kiladangan); Brian Hogan (Lorrha-Dorrha); Mark Kehoe (Kilsheelan-Kilcash); Seamus Kennedy (St. Mary’s Clonmel); Brendan Maher (Borris-Ileigh); Donagh Maher (Burgess); Pádraic Maher (Thurles Sarsfields); Patrick Maher ( Lorrha-Dorrha); Ronan Maher (Thurles Sarsfields); Mark McCarthy (Toomevara); Dan McCormack (Borris-Ileigh); Brian McGrath, John McGrath, Noel McGrath (all Loughmore-Castleiney); Jamie Moloney (Drom & Inch); Jake Morris (Nenagh Éire Óg); Sean O’Brien (Newport); Joe O’Dwyer, John O’Dwyer, Killian O’Dwyer (all Killenaule); Niall O’Meara (Kilruane MacDonaghs); Dillon Quirke (Clonoulty-Rossmore); Jason Ryan (Toomevara); David Sweeney (Kiladangan).

| No. | Player | Position | Club |
|---|---|---|---|
| 1 | Brian Hogan | Goalkeeper | Lorrha-Dorrha |
| 2 | Cathal Barrett | Right Corner Back | Holycross-Ballycahill |
| 3 | James Barry | Full back | Upperchurch-Drombane |
| 4 | Barry Heffernan | Left Corner Back | Nenagh Éire Óg |
| 5 | Brendan Maher | Right half back | Borris-Ileigh |
| 6 | Pádraic Maher | Centre back | Thurles Sarsfields |
| 7 | Ronan Maher | Left half back | Thurles Sarsfields |
| 8 | Noel McGrath | Midfield | Loughmore-Castleiney |
| 9 | Michael Breen | Midfield | Ballina |
| 10 | Dan McCormack | Right half Forward | Borris-Ileigh |
| 11 | John O'Dwyer | Centre forward | Killenaule |
| 12 | Niall O'Meara | Left half Forward | Kilruane MacDonagh's |
| 13 | Jason Forde | Right Corner Forward | Silvermines |
| 14 | Séamus Callanan (c) | Full forward | Drom-Inch |
| 15 | John McGrath | Left Corner Forward | Loughmore-Castleiney |

| No. | Player | Position | Club |
|---|---|---|---|
| 16 | Paul Maher | Substitute | Moyne-Templetuohy |
| 17 | Ger Browne | Substitute | Knockavilla-Donaskeigh |
| 18 | Robert Byrne | Substitute | Portroe |
| 19 | Jerome Cahill | Substitute | Kilruane MacDonagh's |
| 20 | Willie Connors | Substitute | Kildangan |
| 21 | Alan Flynn | Substitute | Kildangan |
| 22 | Mark Kehoe | Substitute | Kilsheelan-Kilcash |
| 23 | Séamus Kennedy | Substitute | St Mary's |
| 24 | Donagh Maher | Substitute | Burgess |
| 25 | Jake Morris | Substitute | Nenagh Éire Óg |
| 26 | Seán O'Brien | Substitute | Newport |

Squad as per Tipperary v Wexford, 2019 All-Ireland Senior Hurling Championship Semi-Final, 28 July 2019

The following players made their competitive senior debut in 2019.

- Robert Byrne against Clare on 26 January.
- Mark Kehoe against Clare on 26 January.
- Killian O'Dwyer against Clare on 26 January.
- Jerome Cahill against Limerick on 30 June.

== 2019 Munster Senior Hurling League ==
Tipperary took part in the Munster Senior Hurling League for the first time in 2019. They began their campaign against Limerick on 14 December 2018 at the Gaelic Grounds. Newcomers to the panel Conor Hammersley, Brendan Maher, Billy McCarthy and Michael Cahill were all unavailable with cruciate knee ligament injuries. Tipperary defeated Limerick by 4-14 to 2-17 in front of an attendance of 3,224. Limerick had started with eight of their 2018 All-Ireland winning team and Tipperary had a 3-6 to 0-11 lead at half time, with Seamus Callanan scoring from a penalty after 60-seconds.

On 5 January 2019, Tipperary played Kerry in their second game of the Munster Senior league at MacDonagh Park in Nenagh. Tipperary won the game by 4-10 to 1-14 and advanced to the final against Clare. Tipperary had a 3-14 to 0-7 lead at half-time after goals from Jason Forde, Mark Kehoe, and Noel McGrath. Patrick Maher got the fourth goal three minutes after the restart.

On 13 January 2019, Tipperary played Clare in the final in front of 4,531 at the Gaelic Grounds. Clare won the game on a 4-19 to 1-18 scoreline. Dan McCormack scored the goal for Tipperary with ten minutes to go. The match was level at 0-11 to 2-5 at half-time.

| 14 December 2018 Round 1 | Limerick | 2-17 - 4-14 | Tipperary | Gaelic Grounds, Limerick |
| | Aaron Gillane 1-8 (0-6 frees); David Reidy 1-3; Colin Ryan 0-3; Barry O’Connell 0-2; Andrew La Touche Cosgrave 0-1. | Report Brian Hogan; S O’Brien, J Barry, D Maher; B Heffernan, S Kenndy, T Fox; M O’Brien, W Connors; C English, R Maher, D McCormack; J Forde, S Callinan, M Kehoe; Subs: Patrick Maher for Kehoe (h-t), J O’Dwyer for O’brien 48), Morris for Breen (49), J Cahill for Connors (63), M McCarthy for Forde (65) | Seamus Callanan 2-8 (1-0 pen, 0-7 frees); Mark Kehoe, Patrick Maher 1-0 each; Jason Forde, Ronan Maher 0-2 each; Colin English, Dan McCormack 0-1 each. | Referee: Rory McGann (Clare) |

| 5 January 2019 Round 3 | Tipperary | 4-20 - 1-14 | Kerry | MacDonagh Park, Nenagh |
| | Jason Forde 1-5 (0-2f, 0-1 ’65), Noel McGrath 1-4, Mark Kehoe 1-3, Patrick ‘Bonner’ Maher 1-0, Jake Morris 0-3, Michael Breen 0-1, Willie Connors 0-1, Dan McCormack 0-1, Cian Darcy 0-1, Donagh Maher 0-1. | Report Barry Hogan; D Maher, Padraic Maher, K O’Dwyer; A Flynn, S Kennedy, B Heffernan; M Breen, W Connors; D McCormack, N McGrath, Patrick Maher; M Kehoe, J Forde, J Morris; Subs: C Barrett for D Maher (48), C Darcy for Kehoe (52), R Byrne for Kennedy (55), M McCarthy for N McGrath (63), T Fox for Heffernan (63). | Brandon Barrett 0-5 (0-4f), Shane Conway 1-2, Michael O’Leary 0-3, Jack Goulding 0-2, Niall O’Mahony 0-1, Padraig Boyle 0-1. | Referee: Nathan Wall (Cork) |

| 13 January 2019 Final | Tipperary | 1-18 - 4-19 | Clare | Gaelic Grounds, Limerick |
| | Seamus Callanan (6f, 1’65) 0-8; Jason Forde 0-5 (1 sideline); Dan McCormack 1-0; Alan Flynn 0-2; Mark Kehoe 0-2; Noel McGrath 0-1 | Report Barry Hogan; C Barrett, Pádraic Maher, D Maher; A Flynn, S Kennedy, J O'Dwyer; W Connors, M Breen; J Forde, Patrick Maher, C English; M Kehoe, S Callanan, J Morris; Subs: R Maher for Connors (h-t), N McGrath for Morris (44), D McCormack for Kehoe (48), K O'Dwyer for Barrett (56), R Byrne for Kennedy (58). | Tony Kelly 2-3 (1f); Colin Guilfoyle 1-3; Cathal McInerney 1-2; Diarmuid Ryan, Niall Deasy (2f) 0-3 each; Ryan Taylor, Shane Golden 0-2 each; Mikey O’Malley 0-1 | Referee: T Walsh (Waterford) |

== 2019 National Hurling League ==
The provisional list of fixtures for the National Hurling League were released in September 2018. Tipperary began their campaign with a home game against Clare on Saturday 26 January.

=== Summary ===
On Saturday 26 January, Tipperary opened their campaign with a home game against Clare at Semple Stadium with a 7pm throw-in. The match was televised live by Eir Sport. Tipperary had three changes from the side announced with Barry Heffernan, Robert Byrne and Willie Connors coming in instead of Joe O'Dwyer, Paddy Cadell and Jason Forde. In wet and windy conditions and in front of 8,217, new captain Seamus Callanan scored 2-7 with both goals coming in the second half, he also had a penalty saved early in the first half and took a point with a second penalty in the second half. The half time score was 0-13 to 1-3 in Tipperary's favor. Clare's Tony Kelly received a straight red card in the 44th minute for a high frontal challenge on Padraic Maher. Tipperary's first goal came in the 50th minute when Jake Morris and Robert Byrne combined to arrow the ball across goal to Seamus Callanan who finished low to the net at the Killinan end. A minute later Callanan got his second after a pass from Morris he hit the ball low into the right corner of the net from the left. Padraic Maher was named as the man of the match.

A week later on Saturday 2 February, Tipperary played their second game of the league against All-Ireland Champions Limerick at the Gaelic Grounds with a 7pm throw-in. The match was televised live by Eir Sport and RTÉ2. James Barry was named in the team to start at full-back in an otherwise unchanged team from the victory over Clare. In freezing conditions and in front of 8,559, Limerick went on to win the game on a 1-21 to 1-14 scoreline. The half time score was 1-9 to 1-8 in Tipperary's favor. Tipperary's goal came in the 22nd minute when Willie Connors combined with Patrick Maher with Maher scoring with a shot into the right corner of the net from the left. Tipperary manager Liam Sheedy confirmed a few days later that Billy McCarthy, Conor Hammersley and Michael Cahill won't be available in 2019 due to injury with 14 players currently on the injury list.

On Sunday 17 February, Tipperary traveled to play Wexford in their third game of the league at the Wexford Park with a 2pm throw-in. It was the first time that they had visited there since 2004. The match was televised deferred by TG4. Manager Liam Sheedy made five changes to his starting side with goalkeeper Paul Maher making his first start of the league campaign, Seamus Kennedy coming into the half-back line and Jason Forde, Niall O’Meara, and John O’Dwyer starting in the forward line. In front of 6,700 Seamus Callanan scored a goal for Tipperary after 46 seconds with a ground-shot to the left corner from the left after a hand-pass by Niall O’Meara. Noel McGrath was sent off in the 33rd minute after picking up two yellow cards and Tipperary led by four points at half-time, 1-7 to 0-6. Tipperay were eight points in front in the second half but Wexford came back to win by one point with a point from Aidan Nolan in the third minute of injury-time. The defeat was the first to Wexford in the National League since 2005.

On Sunday 24 February, Tipperary played Kilkenny in their fourth game of the league at Semple Stadium with a 2pm throw-in. The match was televised live by TG4. Manager Liam Sheedy made two changes to his starting side with Alan Flynn and Willie Connors coming into the team. Pauric Maher was judged to have touched the ball on the ground in the third minute of injury-time and Kilkenny went on to win the game with the resulting free from 75 metres out from goalkeeper Eoin Murphy. In front of 8,273, Kilkenny had a one point lead at half-time on a 0-9 to 0-8 scoreline. Noel McGrath had scored to put Tipperary ahead in the first minute of added time before Richie Hogan got the equaliser for Kilkeeny with Murphy going on to get the winning score. With this defeat Tipperary now have only one win from the previous nine league and championship matches.

On Sunday 3 March, Tipperary were due to play Cork at Páirc Ui Rinn in their fifth game of the league but the match was postponed due to a waterlogged pitch following a pitch inspection by referee Sean Cleere at 1pm. On 4 March the Tipperary panel left for a week long training camp in Alicante, returning on 8 March. Tipperary played Cork two days after returning on 10 March at Páirc Ui Rinn with a 2pm throw-in. The match was televised live by TG4. Manager Liam Sheedy named the same starting line-up that was originally due to line out against Cork the previous weekend with Cathal Barrett, Joe O’Dwyer, Jake Morris, and John McGrath coming into the team instead of Alan Flynn, Seamus Kennedy, Patrick Maher and Willie Connors. Tipperary won the game by 13 points on a 1-29 to 1-16 scoreline in front of 3,681. Tipperary had a 0-16 to 0-6 lead at half time. Man-of-the-match Jason Forde got the goal for Tipperary in the 40th minute when he ran onto the ball before hitting it low to the left corner of the net to put them into a 1-17 to 0-7 lead. With this win Tipperary finished in fourth place in division 1A on 4 points and qualified for the quarter-finals where they went on to play Dublin on Saturday 16 March in Semple Stadium.

In the quarter-final on 16 March, in front of a crowd of 3,503, Dublin defeated Tipperary by one point on a 1-21 to 0-23 scoreline, it was their first win against Tipperary on Tipperary soil since 1946. Tipperary are unchanged from their win over Cork the previous weekend. Brendan Maher made his comeback from the cruciate ligament injury when he came on in the second half. Dublin had a 1-10 to 0-9 lead at the interval with their goal coming in the sixth minute from Fergal Whitely. Tipperary finished with a tally of 18 wides.

=== Results ===
26 January
19:00
Round 1

| Tipperary | 2–16 – 1–11 | Clare |
|---|---|---|
| S Callanan 2-7 (6 frees, 0-1 pen); N McGrath (0-3, 1 sideline); J Morris (0-2); A Flynn, M Breen, W Connors, R Byrne (0-1 each). | Report Brian Hogan; C Barrett, Padraic Maher, D Maher; A Flynn, R Maher, B Heffernan; M Breen, R Byrne; D McCormack, N McGrath, Patrick Maher; W Connors, S Callanan (c), J Morris; Subs: M Kehoe for McGrath (61), John O’Dwyer for Morris (64), N O’Meara for McCormack (70), K O’Dwyer for D Maher (70+1), C Darcy for Byrne (70+3). | N Deasy (1-1, 1-0 pen, 1 free); P Duggan (0-4, 3 frees, 1 ‘65); T Kelly (1 sideline), M O’Malley (1 free, 1 ‘65) (0-2 each); J Conlon, P Collins (0-1 each). |

Semple Stadium, Thurles
Referee: C Lyons (Cork)
2 February
19:00
Round 2

| Limerick | 1–21 – 1–14 | Tipperary |
|---|---|---|
| Aaron Gillane 0-9 (0-5f, 0-2 65), Diarmaid Byrnes 0-4 (0-2f, 0-1 65), Tom Morrissey 0-2, Graeme Mulcahy 1-1, Conor Boylan 0-2, Darragh O’Donovan 0-1, Dan Morrissey 0-1, Peter Casey 0-1 | Report B Hogan; D Maher, J Barry, A Flynn; B Heffernan, R Maher, Padraic Maher; R Byrne, M Breen; D McCormack, N McGrath, W Connors; J Morris, S Callanan (c), Patrick Maher; Subs: J Forde for McCormack (12); N O'Meara for Byrne (49); K O'Dwyer for D Maher (54); M Kehoe for Morris (54), J McGrath for Breen (62). | Seamus Callanan 0-5 (0-5f), Patrick Maher 1-0, Jason Forde 0-3, Michael Breen 0-1, Noel McGrath 0-1, Willie Connors 0-1, Barry Heffernan 0-1, Robert Byrne 0-1, Padraic Maher 0-1 |

Gaelic Grounds, Limerick
Referee: Sean Cleere (Kilkenny)
17 February
14:00
Round 3

| Wexford | 1–15 – 1–14 | Tipperary |
|---|---|---|
| Ian Byrne 0-6 (6fs), Seamus Casey 1-1, Diarmuid O’Keeffe 0-3, Pádraig Foley, Kevin Foley, Cathal Dunbar (sideline), Rory O’Connor, Aidan Nolan 0-1 each. | Report P Maher; D Maher, J Barry, Padraic Maher; S Kennedy, R Maher, B Heffernan; R Byrne, M Breen; J O’Dwyer, N McGrath, Patrick Maher; J Forde, S Callanan (c), N O’Meara; Subs: J Morris for O’Dwyer (51 mins); W Connors for B Heffernan (54); A Flynn for D Maher (57); J McGrath for N O’Meara (59); T Fox for Byrne (67) | Seamus Callanan 1-7 (0-6fs), Jason Forde (1f) and Niall O’Meara 0-2 each, Ronan Maher, Robert Byrne and Jake Morris 0-1 each. |

Wexford Park, Wexford
Referee: Colm Lyons (Cork).
24 February
19:00
Round 4

| Tipperary | 0–17 – 0–18 | Kilkenny |
|---|---|---|
| S Callanan 0-5 (4f), John O'Dwyer 0-4, J Forde (2f), N McGrath, N O'Meara 0-2 each, R Byrne, S Kennedy 0-1 each. | Report Paul Maher; Alan Flynn, James Barry, Ronan Maher; Séamus Kennedy, Paudie Maher, Robert Byrne; Michael Breen, Noel McGrath; Patrick Maher, Willie Connors, Jason Forde; John O’Dwyer, Séamus Callanan (c), Niall O’Meara; Subs: Jake Morris for Connors (42), Joe O’Dwyer for Kennedy (48), John McGrath for Patrick Maher (55), Ger Browne for Breen (67) | A Murphy 0-7 (7f), P Walsh, W Walsh, E Murphy (2f) 0-2 each, B Ryan, G Malone, M Keoghan, R Leahy, R Hogan 0-1 each. |

Semple Stadium, Thurles
Referee: Johnny Murphy (Limerick)
10 March
14:00
Round 5

| Cork | 1–16 – 1–29 | Tipperary |
|---|---|---|
| Patrick Horgan 0-6 (0-4f, 0-1 ’65), Conor Lehane 0-4, Aidan Walsh 1-0, Bill Cooper, Mark Coleman, Shane Kingston, Robbie O’Flynn, Luke Meade, Alan Cadogan 0-1 each | Report P Maher; C Barrett, J Barry, Joe O’Dwyer; R Maher, Padraic Maher, R Byrne; N McGrath, M Breen; J McGrath, S Callanan (c), N O’Meara; John O’Dwyer, J Forde, J Morris; Subs: Patrick Maher for Forde (58), A Flynn for Joe O’Dwyer (60), B Heffernan for O’Meara (64), M Kehoe for Callanan ( 68). | Jason Forde 1-13 (0-8f, 0-1 ’65), Michael Breen 0-6, Seamus Callanan 0-3 (0-1f), Jake Morris, Niall O’Meara 0-2 each, Noel McGrath, John McGrath, John O’Dwyer 0-1 each |

Páirc Uí Rinn, Cork
Referee: Sean Cleere (Kilkenny)
16 March
16:30
Quarter-final

| Tipperary | 0–23 – 1–21 | Dublin |
|---|---|---|
| J Forde 0-7 (6f), N McGrath 0-4 (1f), J Morris 0-3, M Kehoe, Callanan 0-2 each, R Maher, M Breen, N O'Meara, J McGrath, B Maher (f) 0-1 each. | Report P Maher; C Barrett, J Barry, Joe O'Dwyer; R Maher, Pádraic Maher, R Byrne; N McGrath, M Breen; J McGrath, S Callanan (c), N O'Meara; John O'Dwyer, J Forde, J Morris; Subs: Patrick Maher for J McGrath (35), B Maher for Byrne (47), M Kehoe for John O'Dwyer (57), A Flynn for Breen (61), D Maher for N McGrath (73 inj) | E Dillon 1-3, S Moran 0-5 (3f, 1 '65), O O'Rorke 0- 5 (4f), C Boland, P Ryan 0-2 each, E O'Donnell, C Crummey, J Malone 0-1 each |

Semple Stadium, Thurles
Referee: Pat Murphy (Carlow).

== 2019 Munster Senior Hurling Championship ==
In mid September the schedule for the Munster Senior Hurling Championship round-robin games was released. Tipperary opened their campaign in Páirc Uí Chaoimh on 12 May against Cork.

On 2 May, manager Liam Sheedy named the following panel of players for the Munster Championship, Séamus Callanan (Drom & Inch, captain), Noel McGrath (Loughmore-Castleiney, vice-captain), Alan Flynn (Kiladangan), Barry Heffernan (Nenagh Éire Óg), Barry Hogan (Kiladangan), Brendan Maher (Borris-Ileigh), Brian Hogan (Lorrha-Dorrha), Brian McGrath (Loughmore-Castleiney), Cathal Barrett (Holycross-Ballycahill), Cian Darcy (Kilruane MacDonagh’s), Conor Hammersley (Clonoulty-Rossmore), Colin English (Fr Sheehy’s), Dan McCormack (Borris-Ileigh), David Sweeney (Kiladangan), Donagh Maher (Burgess), Ger Browne (Knockavilla-Donaskeigh Kickhams), Jake Morris (Nenagh Éire Óg), James Barry (Upperchurch-Drombane), Jamie Moloney (Drom & Inch), Jason Forde (Silvermines), Jason Ryan (Toomevara), Jerome Cahill (Kilruane MacDonagh’s), Joe O’Dwyer (Killenaule), John McGrath (Loughmore-Castleiney), John O’Dwyer (Killenaule), Killian O’Dwyer (Killenaule), Mark Kehoe (Kilsheelan-Kilcash), Mark McCarthy (Toomevara), Michael Breen (Ballina), Niall O’Meara (Kilruane MacDonagh’s), Paddy Cadell (JK Bracken’s), Padraic Maher (Thurles Sarsfields), Patrick Maher (Lorrha-Dorrha), Paul Maher (Moyne-Templetuohy), Robert Byrne (Portroe), Ronan Maher (Thurles Sarsfields), Séamus Kennedy (St Mary’s Clonmel), Seán O’Brien (Newport), Tom Fox (Éire Óg Annacarty-Donohill), Willie Connors (Kiladangan).

=== Round 1 (v Cork 12 May) ===
In early May, defender Michael Cahill broke his kneecap in an accidental collision in training which required surgery. Tipperary were going into this game with just two wins from their previous 11 League and Championship games. The Tipperary team named for the match included former captain Brendan Maher, completing his comeback from the torn ACL picked up in 2018. The match was televised live on RTÉ2 as part of the Sunday Game presented by Joanne Cantwell with analysis by Jackie Tyrrell, Anthony Daly, and Ursula Jacob. Commentary on the game was provided by Marty Morrissey alongside Michael Duignan. Tipperary won the game on a 2-28 to 1-24 scoreline in front of an attendance of 30,274 in sunny conditions. Tipperary had a 1-13 to 0-15 lead at half time and eleven different scorers during the game with every player in the starting team from right wing-back to left corner-forward getting a score, all bar four points came from open play. The first Tipperary goal came in the third minute from Seamus Callanan when he cut in from the right to shoot powerfully to the net after a hand pass from Niall O’Meara. The second goal came in the 50th minute from John McGrath with a low shot to the left corner after a pass from out on the right from John O’Dwyer which put them into an eight-point lead on 2-20 to 0-18. John O’Dwyer was named as the man of the match with 0-7 from play during the game.

=== Round 2 (v Waterford 19 May) ===
A week later Tipperary played Waterford at Semple Stadium in their second match of the Munster Championship. The Tipperary team named for the match included Alan Flynn coming in at half-back and Ronan Maher moving to corner back. There was one late change made on the day with Dan McCormack replacing Niall O’Meara in the half forward line. The match was televised live on RTÉ2 as part of the Sunday Game presented by Joanne Cantwell with analysis by Henry Shefflin, Anthony Daly, and Donal Óg Cusack. Commentary on the game was provided by Darragh Maloney alongside Dónal O'Grady. Tipperary won the game on a 2-30 to 0-18 scoreline in front of an attendance of 22,883 in dry conditions. Tipperary had a 0-16 to 0-10 lead at half time. After 29 minutes Waterford's Conor Gleeson’s received a red card in the first half after two yellow cards. After 52 minutes Tipperary had a 0-20 to 0-17 lead before their first goal came a minute later from Jason Forde with a low shot to the left corner from the left after a pass from John O’Dwyer. The second goal came in the 71st minute from Seamus Callanan with a low shot from the left which deflected in off Waterford defender Conor Prunty after a pass along the ground from Jason Forde. Jason Forde was named as the man of the match with 1-9 during the game.

=== Round 3 (v Clare 2 June) ===
In round three, Tipperary traveled to meet Clare at Cusack Park in Ennis on 2 June. The last championship meeting of the two counties in Ennis was back in 1986 when Clare won by 2-10 to 1-11. The Tipperary team named for the match showed Niall O’Meara coming into the full forward line in place of Dan McCormack. There were two late changes made on the day with Barry Heffernan coming in for James Barry in the full-back line and Dan McCormack starting in place of Niall O’Meara The match was televised live on RTÉ2 as part of the Sunday Game presented by Joanne Cantwell with analysis by Jackie Tyrrell and Ken McGrath. Commentary on the game was provided by Ger Canning alongside Michael Duignan. Tipperary won the game on a 3-21 to 0-17 scoreline in front of an attendance of 18,316 in windy and rainy conditions. Playing with the wind, Tipperary had a 1-14 to 0-11 lead at half time with the first goal coming from Noel McGrath in the 21st minute when he dived to tap the ball along the ground and into the net from close range. The second goal came in the 40th minute, a free from the left by Jason Forde hit the right post, the rebound was picked up by Seamus Callanan who shot powerfully to the right corner of the net to put Tipperary into a 2-14 to 0-12 lead. Callanan's goal was his 30th championship goal and made him Tipperary’s highest championship goal scorer in its history. The third goal came from Patrick Maher in the 50th minute when he flicked the ball past the advancing Clare goalkeeper Donal Tuohy, this put Tipperary into a 3-16 to 0-12 lead. John McGrath was named as the man of the match with 0-6 during the game.

=== Round 4 (v Limerick 16 June) ===
Tipperary played Limerick at Semple Stadium in round 4 of the Munster Championship on 16 June. The Tipperary team named for the match showed three changes from the Clare match with James Barry, Seán O’Brien, and Jake Morris coming into the side in place of Barry Heffernan, Alan Flynn and Dan McCormack. The match was televised live on RTÉ2 as part of the Sunday Game presented by Joanne Cantwell with analysis by Anthony Daly and Derek McGrath. Commentary on the game was provided by Ger Canning alongside Michael Duignan. Tipperary won the game on a 1-22 to 0-21 scoreline in front of an attendance of 39,115 in rainy conditions. Playing against the wind, Tipperary had a 0-12 to 0-8 lead at halftime despite being held scoreless for the first nine minutes of the game. Limerick cut the lead to two points early in the second half and Limerick goalkeeper Nickie Quaid then made a diving save to deny John O’Dwyer. Seamus Callanan got the only goal of the game in the 38th minute when he ran in from the right and hit the dropping ball low to the net. Callanan was named as the man of the match with 1-4 during the game. This result meant that both Tipperary and Limerick would contest the Munster Final on 30 June, which will be held in the Gaelic Grounds. Bonner Maher and Cathal Barrett were both injured during the game and it was confirmed that Maher had torn his cruciate in his right knee and would be out of action for the rest of the year. After a scan it was revealed that Barrett had only suffered a mild hamstring tear and could be available for the Munster Final.

=== 2019 Munster Final (v Limerick 30 June) ===
After finishing the group stage with four wins out of four, Tipperary played Limerick who finished in second place in the group, in the Munster Final at the Gaelic Grounds. The Tipperary team named for the match included Cathal Barrett, but he did not start, Séamus Kennedy coming into the team in his place, while Dan McCormack replaced the injured Patrick Maher. The match was televised live on RTÉ2 as part of the Sunday Game presented by Joanne Cantwell with analysis by Anthony Daly, Donal Óg Cusack and Henry Shefflin. Commentary on the game was provided by Ger Canning alongside Michael Duignan. Limerick won the game on a 2-26 to 2-14 scoreline in front of an attendance of 44,052 in dry conditions. Playing with the wind in the first half, Seamus Callanan scored a goal for Tipperary in the 18th minute when he ran in on goal after a pass from Noel McGrath to shoot low to the left corner of the net, this put Tipperary into a 1-6 to 0-4 lead. Tipperary goalkeeper Brian Hogan made goal saving saves from Cian Lynch and Gearoid Hegarty in the first half. Man of the match Peter Casey got a goal for Limerick in the 26th minute, flicking to the net after a pass from the left by Aaron Gillane. Limerick had a 1-11 to 1-9 lead at half-time. Tipperary's second goal came from John McGrath in the 44th minute when he got free running in from the right to shoot to the right of the net. Kyle Hayes got a second goal for Limerick in the 55th minute running in on goal to flick to the net to put them six points in front. Tipperary will now go into the All-Ireland quarter-finals where they will play the winners of the Dublin v Laois preliminary quarter-final in Croke Park on 14 July.

=== Results ===
12 May
16:00
Round 1

| Cork | 1–24 – 2–28 | Tipperary |
|---|---|---|
| P. Horgan (0-14, 10 frees); S. Harnedy (1-2); C. Lehane, S. Kingston (0-3 each); R. O’Flynn, T. O’Mahony (0-1 each). | Report B. Hogan; C. Barrett, J. Barry, S. O’Brien; B. Maher, Pádraic Maher, R. Maher; N. McGrath, M. Breen; N. O’Meara, J. O’Dwyer, Patrick Maher; J. McGrath, S. Callanan (c), J. Forde; Subs: D. McCormack for M. Breen (49); J. Morris for J. Forde (55); W. Connors for N. O’Meara (inj 63); M. Kehoe for Patrick Maher (66); C. Darcy for N. McGrath (70). | S. Callanan (1-4); J. O’Dwyer (0-7); J. Forde (0-5, 3 frees), J. McGrath (1-1); N. McGrath (0-4, 1 65); B. Maher (0-2), M. Breen, Pádraic Maher, N. O’Meara, Patrick Maher, R. Maher (0-1 each). |

Páirc Uí Chaoimh, Cork
Referee: S Cleere (Kilkenny)
19 May
14:00
Round 2

| Tipperary | 2–30 – 0–18 | Waterford |
|---|---|---|
| J Forde 1-9 (0-3 frees, 0-1 line 'cut'), M Breen 0-6, J McGrath 0-5, J O'Dwyer 0-4, S Callanan 1-0, N McGrath 0-2 (0-1 free), R Maher 0-2 (0-1 line 'cut'), B Heffernan and J Morris 0-1 each. | Report B Hogan; C Barrett, J Barry, R Maher; B Maher, Padraic Maher, A Flynn; N McGrath, M Breen; J Forde, Patrick Maher, D McCormack; J O'Dwyer, S Callanan (c), J McGrath; Subs: B Heffernan for B Maher (half-time), R Byrne for McCormack (48 mins), W Connor for N McGrath (60 mins), J Morris for O'Dwyer (66 mins), G Browne for Patrick Maher (70 mins). | Pauric Mahony 0-9 (0-7 frees), T Ryan 0-3, A Glesson 0-2, T de Burca, B O'Halloran, J Barron and Stephen Bennett 0-1 each. |

Semple Stadium, Thurles
Referee: J Keenan (Wicklow)
2 June
16:00
Round 3

| Clare | 0–17 – 3–21 | Tipperary |
|---|---|---|
| P. Duggan (0-9, 8 frees); T. Kelly (0-3, 2 frees); P. Collins; D. Ryan, D. Fitzgerald, S. Golden, J. McCarthy (0-1 each). | Report B. Hogan; A. Flynn, B. Heffernan, C. Barrett; R. Maher, B. Maher, Pádraic Maher; N. McGrath, M. Breen; D. McCormack, J. O’Dwyer, Patrick Maher; J. McGrath, S. Callanan (c), J. Forde; Subs:W. Connors for M. Breen (56); J. Morris for J.O’Dwyer (61); R. Byrne for R. Maher (66); G. Browne for D. McCormack (69) | J. McGrath (0-6); J. Forde (0-6, frees); S. Callanan (1-3); N. McGrath, Patrick Maher (1-2 each); J. O’Dwyer, B. Maher (0-1 each). |

Cusack Park, Ennis
Referee: Alan Kelly (Galway)
16 June
14:00
Round 4

| Tipperary | 1–22 – 0–21 | Limerick |
|---|---|---|
| Jason Forde 0-8 (4fs, 2 sideline cuts), Seamus Callanan 1-4, Padraic Maher, John McGrath, Noel McGrath (1 free) 0-2 each, Brendan Maher, Michael Breen, Jake Morris, John O’Dwyer 0-1 each | Report Brian Hogan; Sean O’Brien, James Barry, Cathal Barrett; Brendan Maher, Padraic Maher, Ronan Maher; Michael Breen, Noel McGrath; Jason Forde, John O’Dwyer, Patrick Maher; John McGrath, Seamus Callanan (c), Jake Morris; Subs: Alan Flynn for Barrett (33 inj), Dan McCormack for Patrick Maher (35 inj), Robert Byrne for Breen (47), Mark Kehoe for Morris (63), Willie Connors for J McGrath (68). | Aaron Gillane 0-12 (10fs); Tom Morrissey, Diarmuid Byrnes (2 65s) 0-3 each, Shane Dowling, Graeme Mulachy, Cian Lynch 0-1 each |

Semple Stadium, Thurles
Referee: Sean Cleere (Kilkenny)
30 June
14:00
Munster Final

| Limerick | 2–26 – 2–14 | Tipperary |
|---|---|---|
| Peter Casey 1-5, Kyle Hayes 1-2, Tom Morrissey, Aaron Gillane (0-3f) 0-4 each, Gearoid Hegarty, Diarmaid Byrnes (0-3f) 0-3 each, Graeme Mulcahy 0-2, Barry Nash 0-1. | Report B Hogan; S Kennedy, J Barry, S O'Brien; B Maher, Padraic Maher, R Maher; M Breen, N McGrath; J Forde, J O'Dwyer, D McCormack; J McGrath, S Callanan (c), J Morris; Subs: N O'Meara for Breen (half-time), R Byrne for N McGrath (54 mins), J Cahill for O'Dwyer (61 mins), B Heffernan for Barry (63 mins), M Kehoe for J McGrath (65 mins). | Jason Forde 0-6 (0-3f), Séamus Callanan 1-1, John McGrath 1-0, Ronan Maher 0-2, Noel McGrath (0-1f), Dan McCormack, John O’Dwyer, Jake Morris, Jerome Cahill 0-1 each. |

Gaelic Grounds, Limerick
Referee: Paud O’Dwyer (Carlow)

== 2019 All-Ireland Senior Hurling Championship ==
=== Quarter-final (v Laois 14 July) ===
Tipperary played Laois in the quarter-finals on 14 July in Croke Park. It was the first meeting between the sides in the championship since Tipperary won by 3-28 to 0-13 on 14 June 2003. The Tipperary team named for the match included Cathal Barrett returning from injury and Niall O’Meara, while Ger Browne comes in to start in midfield. The match was televised live on RTÉ2 as part of the Sunday Game presented by Joanne Cantwell with analysis by Anthony Daly, Ken McGrath and Henry Shefflin. Commentary on the game was provided by Ger Canning alongside Dónal O'Grady. Tipperary playing in a change strip of navy brown and against the wind in the first half won the game on a 2-25 to 1-18 scoreline in front of 44,135 in sunny conditions. Tipperary scored their first goal after 12 minutes with a penalty into the left corner from Jason Forde at the hill 16 end after he was fouled. Their second goal came after 16 minutes when Noel McGrath passed into Seamus Callanan who cut in from the right to hit low to the left corner of the net from a tight angle to put Tipperary into a 2-4 to 0-5 lead. Ross King got a goal for Laois after 34 minutes shooting past the advancing Brian Hogan and into the net. The half time score was Tipperary 2-11 Laois 1-10. Aaron Dunphy was sent off for Laois in the second minute of the second half for striking the legs of Padraic Maher off the ball. Michael Breen was sent-off late for Tipperary with a second yellow card after a heavy challenge on Paddy Purcell. Laois defender Jack Kelly was named as the man of the match. Tipperary will now go into the All-Ireland semi-finals where they will play Davy Fitzgerald's Leinster Champions Wexford in Croke Park on 28 July.

=== Semi-final (v Wexford 28 July) ===
Tipperary played Wexford in Croke Park on 28 July in the All Ireland semi-final. It was the first meeting between the sides in the All-Ireland semi-finals since Tipperary won by 3-12 to 0-10 in 2001. The match was televised live on RTÉ2 as part of the Sunday Game presented by Joanne Cantwell from the Croke Park studio with analysis by Anthony Daly, Ken McGrath and Ursula Jacob. Commentary on the game was provided by Darragh Maloney alongside Michael Duignan. The match was also live on Sky Sports presented by Rachel Wyse and Brian Carney. Tipperary won the game on a 1-28 to 3-20 scoreline in front of 61,852 in sunny conditions to qualify for the All-Ireland Final on 18 August. The Tipperary team named for the match showed two changes from the Laois game with Barry Heffernan and Michael Breen starting in place of Alan Flynn. Before the start of the match Séamus Kennedy also came into the team in place of James Barry. Tipperary playing into the Davin end in the first half scored a goal after 9 minutes when Niall O’Meara handpassed out to Seamus Callanan who pulled on the ball from a tight angle on the right with the ball flying past Wexford goalkeeper Mark Fanning and going into the left corner of the net to put Tipperary into a 1-2 to 0-4 lead, it was his 34th championship goal for Tipperary. Wexford scored their first goal after 25 minutes when Conor McDonald found the net when he caught a ball from the left before turning onto his right and firing the ball low to the right corner of the net past Brian Hogan who got a touch on the ball. After 31 minutes a goal by John McGrath was ruled out after the referee went back and awarded a point to Wexford which Brian Hogan had not prevented going over the bar 27 seconds earlier. Wexford had a 1-14 to 1-12 lead at half-time and five minutes into the second half Tipperary had gone a point in front on a 1-15 to 1-16 scoreline. Five minutes later John McGrath received a second yellow card for striking out at Damien Reck with the hurl. Wexford got a second goal in the 50th minute when Lee Chin ran at the Tipperary defence before shooting low to the left corner of the net past the diving Brian Hogan to put Wexford into a 2-18 to 1-16 lead. Seven minutes later the sides were level with Ger Browne getting a point to make the score 2-18 to 1-21, the fifth unanswered point from Tipperary. With ten minutes to go Wexford got a third goal from Conor McDonald from close range after a pass from Lee Chin. A Jake Morris goal in time added on was ruled out after the referee had blown for a free which was converted by Jason Forde to put Tipperary into a one point lead, a further point from a 65 from Jason Forde and a late point from the left by Jake Morris were enough for Tipperary to win by two points on a 1-28 to 3-20 scoreline. Tipperary outscored Wexford by 0-12 to 1-2 for the last twenty minutes of the match. Noel McGrath was named as the man of the match after scoring four points from play.

=== Final (v Kilkenny 18 August) ===
==== Build-up ====
Tipperary went on to play Kilkenny in Croke Park on 18 August in the All Ireland final.

This was the eight time in eleven years that the counties had played each other in the championship, with Kilkenny winning 5 times. Kilkenny go into the final having won 36 All Ireland titles, 11 titles in the last 17 years (2000, 2002, 2003, 2006, 2007, 2008, 2009, 2011, 2012, 2014, and 2015), with Tipperary on 27 titles, 3 titles over the same period (2001, 2010 and 2016).

Tickets for the match ranged in price from €45 for the terrace to €90 for stands and the match was a sell-out. The match programme cost €7, an increase of €2 from 2018.

An open night for Tipperary hurling supporters was held at Semple Stadium in Thurles on 31 July. The Tipperary Association Dublin hosted the traditional Post Match Banquet for the Tipperary teams, continuing a tradition lasting over 50 years, where Tipperary teams appearing in All-Ireland finals are hosted by the Tipperary Association Dublin. The Banquet was held in the Clayton Burlington Hotel in Dublin, starting at 8pm.

Jacqui Hurley and Des Cahill presented Up for the Match on 17 August on RTÉ One with guests including Lar Corbett, Shane McGrath, Jackie Tyrrell, Paddy Stapleton, Orla O’Dwyer, Joe Hayes, the Two Johnnies and Una Healy.

The match was televised live on RTÉ2 as part of the Sunday Game presented by Joanne Cantwell from the Croke Park studio with analysis by Anthony Daly, Donal Óg Cusack and Henry Shefflin. Commentary on the game was provided by Marty Morrissey alongside Michael Duignan. The match was also live on Sky Sports.

The Tipperary team named for the match on the Friday night was the same that lined out in the semi-final against Wexford.

==== Match Summary ====
In wet and showery conditions, Kilkenny opened the scoring in the first minute with a free from TJ Reid. Michael Breen got Tipperary's first point after 3 minutes to make the score 2-1. A torrential downpour came after around 5 minutes of the game with many heading for cover under the stands. Tipperary playing into the Davin end in the first half might have had a penalty after 9 minutes when Seamus Callanan was pulled down inside the square with the referee awarding a free instead. After 16 minutes Cathal Barrett caught Richie Hogan high across the faceguard with his hurley with Kilkenny being awarded a free which they scored to make it 6-3. Three minutes later Tipperary goalkeeper Brian Hogan caught John Donnelly’s shot from over his crossbar with HawkEye awarding the point. Tipperary scored their first goal of the match after 25 minutes when Jason Forde found Niall O'Meara with a hand pass and he turned past Conor Fogarty before shooting low to the right corner of the net to make the score 0-8 to 1-5. After 33 minutes Cathal Barrett was caught high with a right shoulder to the head near the Hogan Stand sideline from Richie Hogan with the referee showing a straight red card to Hogan. Tipperary had a one point lead at half-time with the score 1-9 to 0-11.

Kilkenny leveled the match with the first point of the second half. After 38 minutes Tipperary got a second goal, with Seamus Callanan getting his eighth goal of the championship when he followed up after John McGrath’s effort was half blocked to scramble the ball low to the left of the net. Five minutes later they got their third goal when Seamus Callanan found John O'Dwyer with a cross-field pass from the right to the left edge of the box with O'Dwyer firing powerfully to the net to put Tipperary into an eight point lead on 3-12 to 0-13. Tipperary eased to victory after that and the full time score was 3-25 to 0-20 to win their 28th All-Ireland title.

Tipperary captain Séamus Callanan accepted the Liam MacCarthy Cup from GAA president John Horan in the Hogan Stand. The Tipperary team then did a victory lap around Croke Park with the trophy.

==== Reaction ====
Tipperary captain Séamus Callanan speaking to RTE after the match said "It’s everything we f...ing dreamed of, we put in so much work and to finally get there in the end of it is such an unbelievable feeling, I’m so proud of that group there."

Tipperary manager Liam Sheedy speaking to RTE Radio singled out his family for special praise on the day of the match.

Kilkenny manager Brian Cody was amazed that a red card was shown to Richie Hogan, saying "We were beaten well in the final score but it is a huge decision to make, to issue a red card".

Former Kilkenny hurler Henry Shefflin speaking on the Sunday Game argued that the red card issued to Richie Hogan for the high tackle on Cathal Barrett should not have been red. Also former Kilkenny hurler Jackie Tyrrell speaking on the Sunday Game on the night of the final also taught that a red card should not have been shown. Richie Hogan speaking two days after the final insisted that it should never have been a red card. Kilkenny appealed the one match suspension given to Hogan but on 6 November the suspension was upheld.

Highlights of the final were shown on The Sunday Game programme which aired at 9:30pm that night on RTÉ Two and was presented by Des Cahill with match analysis from Brendan Cummins, Cyril Farrell, Jackie Tyrell, Ursula Jacob, Graeme Mulcahy, Derek McGrath and Enda Rowland. On the man of the match award shortlist were Ronan Maher, Noel McGrath and Barry Heffernan with Noel McGrath winning the award which was presented by GAA president John Horan at the post match Tipperary function at the Clayton Burlington Hotel in Dublin. Tipperary manager Liam Sheedy, captain Seamus Callanan, Brian Hogan and father Ken Hogan were interviewed by Joanne Cantwell and Marty Morrissey at the hotel function.

==== Homecoming ====
The Tipperary team made the traditional visits to Our Lady's Children's Hospital in Crumlin and Temple Street hospital on 19 August before returning home by train where the homecoming event was held at Semple Stadium in Thurles.

A stage was set up on the dome side of the stadium with the gates of the stadium opened at 4.00 pm.

The Tipperary senior back-room team and players were introduced to a crowd of over 30,000 at 8.00 pm, with captain Seamus Callanan addressing the crowd and music from the Two Johnnies and 'Slievenamon' sang by Louise Morrissey along with the team. 19-T-LIAM number plates were issued for sale to celebrate the win with the proceeds going to the team holiday. Tipp FM provided live radio coverage of the homecoming. The team then travelled out to Seamus Callanan's home village of Drom to the Ragg bar where the celebrations continued.

Six days later on 24 August, Tipperary won the All-Ireland Under-20 Hurling Championship after a 5-17 to 1-18 win against Cork at the Gaelic Grounds. Senior panel members Jake Morris, Jerome Cahill and Paddy Cadell were in the Tipperary team and picked up a second All-Ireland win in a week.

In October, manager Liam Sheedy confirmed that he would be remaining on as manager for 2020.

=== Results ===
14 July
16:00
Quarter-final

| Tipperary | 2–25 – 1–18 | Laois |
|---|---|---|
| Jason Forde 1-12 (1-0 pen, 0-8f, 0-1 65), Seamus Callanan 1-2, Noel McGrath 0-3, Ronan Maher and Ger Browne 0-2 each, Padraic Maher, John McGrath, Alan Flynn, Barry Heffernan 0-1 each. | Report B Hogan; C Barrett, J Barry, A Flynn; B Maher, P Maher, R Maher; N McGrath, G Browne; D McCormack, J O’Dwyer, N O’Meara; J Forde, S Callanan (c), J McGrath; Subs: M Breen for Flynn (48 mins); M Kehoe for O’Dwyer (54); J Cahill for Browne (57); B Heffernan for Barry (62); J Morris for O’Meara (68). | Mark Kavanagh 0-11 (0-11f), Ross King 1-0, Aaron Dunphy and Jack Kelly 0-2, John Lennon, Paddy Purcell and Willie Dunphy 0-1 each. |

Croke Park, Dublin
Referee: Colm Lyons (Cork)
28 July
15:30
Semi-final

| Tipperary | 1–28 – 3–20 | Wexford |
|---|---|---|
| Jason Forde 0-12 (0-8f, 0-2 ’65), Séamus Callanan 1-2, Noel McGrath 0-4, John O’Dwyer 0-3, Ronan Maher 0-2, Michael Breen, Ger Browne, Willie Connors, Mark Kehoe, Jake Morris 0-1 each. | Report Brian Hogan; Cathal Barrett, Barry Heffernan, Ronan Maher; Brendan Maher, Padraic Maher, Seamus Kennedy; Noel McGrath, Michael Breen; Dan McCormack, John O’Dwyer, Niall O’Meara; Jason Forde, Seamus Callanan (c), John McGrath; Subs: Willie Connors for Dan McCormack (52), Ger Browne for Michael Breen (54), Mark Kehoe for Niall O’Meara (56), Alan Flynn for Barry Heffernan (65), Jake Morris for John O’Dwyer (67) | Lee Chin 1-7 (0-6f, 0-1 ’65), Conor McDonald 2-1, Rory O’Connor 0-3, Diarmuid O’Keeffe, Paul Morris 0-2 each, Liam Ryan, Paudie Foley, Kevin Foley, Liam Óg McGovern, Jack O’Connor 0-1 each. |

Croke Park, Dublin
Referee: Seán Cleere (Kilkenny)
18 August
15:30
Final

| Tipperary | 3–25 – 0–20 | Kilkenny |
|---|---|---|
| Jason Forde 0-8 (0-5f, 0-2 ‘65), Séamus Callanan (0-1f), John O’Dwyer 1-2 each, Niall O’Meara 1-0, John McGrath 0-3, Noel McGrath (0-1f), Séamus Kennedy, Willie Connors 0-2 each, Michael Breen, Ger Browne, Jake Morris, Mark Kehoe 0-1 each. | Report Brian Hogan; Cathal Barrett, Ronan Maher, Barry Heffernan; Seamus Kennedy, Brendan Maher, Padraic Maher; Noel McGrath, Michael Breen; Dan McCormack, Niall O’Meara, John McGrath; Callanan (c), John O’Dwyer, Jason Forde; Subs: Mark Kehoe for O’Meara (51), Willie Connors for McCormack (57), Jake Morris for Forde (60), Sean O’Brien for Barrett (61), Ger Browne for Breen (64). | TJ Reid 0-11 (0-10f), John Donnelly 0-3, Billy Ryan 0-2, Pádraig Walsh, Richie Hogan, Colin Fennelly, Walter Walsh 0-1 each. |

Croke Park, Dublin
Referee: James Owens (Wexford)

== Awards ==
The PwC All-Star Awards

The nominations for the PwC All-Stars were announced on 26 September with Tipperary receiving eleven nominations in the 45-player shortlist. Brendan Maher, Ronan Maher, Pádraic Maher, Cathal Barrett, Noel McGrath, John O’Dwyer, Seamus Callanan, John McGrath, Brian Hogan, Barry Heffernan and Jason Forde were the nominated players. Seamus Kennedy, Michael Breen, Dan McCormack and Niall O’Meara missed out on a nomination. Seamus Callanan was nominated for the Hurler of the Year award alongside Kilkenny's TJ Reid and Cork's Patrick Horgan.

The award winners were announced on 31 October with the awards presented on 1 November at Dublin’s Convention Centre. Tipperary won seven awards, Brian Hogan, Ronan Maher, Cathal Barrett, Brendan Maher, Pádraic Maher, Noel McGrath, and Séamus Callanan all being named in the team. Tipperary’s awards saw them breach the 100 award threshold and bring their total number to 104, behind only Kilkenny and Cork.

Séamus Callanan was also named as the Hurler of the Year for the first time at the awards show.

RTE Sports Awards

On 10 December, manager Liam Sheedy was nominated for the RTÉ Sports Manager of the Year Award, and the Tipperary team were nominated for the RTÉ Sports Team of the Year Award.

== Retirements ==
On 22 October, defender Donagh Maher announced his retirement from inter-county hurling after six years in the panel. He was an unused substitute in the All-Ireland Final.

On 25 October, defender James Barry announced his retirement from inter-county hurling after seven years in the panel. He was an unused substitute in the All-Ireland Final.
