= 2020 Tipperary county hurling team season =

- Team: Tipperary county
- Manager: Liam Sheedy
- Captain: Séamus Callanan
- All-Ireland SHC: Quarter-Final
- Munster SHC: Semi-Final
- National League: 5th Division 1 Group A
- Top scorer Championship: Jason Forde (1-21)
- Highest SHC attendance: None (COVID-19)
- Lowest SHC attendance: None (COVID-19)
- Standard Kit

The 2020 season was Liam Sheedy's second year in charge since returning as manager of the Tipperary senior hurling team, having been previously in charge from 2008 to 2010.

The team were sponsored by world leading CEO advisory firm Teneo for the second year in a deal worth up to €180,000 a year on a rolling 12-month contract.

Tipperary are the defending All-Ireland champions and were attempting to retain the title for the first time since 1965.

On 13 December 2019, Eoin Kelly was added as a selector on the team having been a free-taking coach in 2019. Also former manager Eamon O'Shea took up a role as Performance Director having been part of the backroom team in 2019.

The team traveled to Mexico and New York in January for their team holiday, returning on 15 January.

On 9 March, the day after their final league game against Galway, the Tipperary panel and management flew to Alicante for a weeks warm weather training, returning to Shannon Airport on 13 March. The travelling party stayed in private accommodation where there were no other residents and remained in this private location for the duration of their stay. The team went into self-isolation after returning due to the COVID-19 pandemic.

It was the first year of COVID-19 affecting the season match schedule, no supporters were allowed to attend championship matches.

== 2020 senior hurling management team ==
Name	Position	Club
Liam Sheedy	Manager	Portroe
Tommy Dunne	Coach	Toomevara
Darragh Egan	Coach	Kildangan

=== 2020 squad ===
The following players made their competitive senior debut in 2020.

- Paddy Cadell against Limerick on 25 January.
- Bryan O'Mara against Limerick on 25 January.
- Craig Morgan against Limerick on 25 January.
- Dillon Quirke against Limerick on 25 January.
- Jamie Moloney against Limerick on 25 January.
- Brian McGrath against Waterford 1 March.
- Paul Maher against Galway 8 March.

== 2020 Munster Senior Hurling League ==
Tipperary opened their season on 15 December with a one-point defeat to Clare in the opening group game of the 2020 Munster Senior Hurling League at MacDonagh Park. The match was shown live on the Irish Examiner website. On 20 December, Tipperary played their second game in the competition against Limerick in the Gaelic Grounds. They lost by 2–22 to 1–17 in front of a crowd of 1,628. The match was also shown live on the Irish Examiner website.

=== Results ===
15 December 2019	Tipperary	1-19 – 2-17	Clare	MacDonagh Park, Nenagh
	J Forde (0-14 7f 2SC) P Flynn (0-03), T Fox (1-00), M Breen (0-01), M Kehoe (0-01)	Report P. Maher; J. O’Dwyer, J. Moloney, C. Morgan; A. Flynn, R. Maher, R. Byrne; M. Breen, P. Cadell; M. Kehoe, T. Fox, J. Cahill; W. Connors, J. Forde (c), P. Flynn; Subs: C. Darcy for Fox (53); M. McCarthy for Cahill (61); P. Maher for O’Dwyer (63); B. Heffernan for Moloney (68)	N Deasy (0-07 5f), I Galvin (1-02), P Collins (0-03), S Morey (1-00), D Ryan (0-03), A Fahey (0-01 1f), C McInerney (0-01), A McCarthy (0-01)	Referee: Colm Lyons (Cork)

20 December 2019	Limerick	2-22 – 1-17	Tipperary	LIT Gaelic Grounds, Limerick
	A Breen (1-5); D Reidy (0-6, 0-6 frees); S Flanagan (0-3); D Dempsey (1-0); D O’Connell T Morrissey (0-2 each); B Ryan, D Morrissey, P O’Loughlin, D O’Donovan (0-1 each).	Report	J Forde (0-8, 0-6 frees, 0-1 sc); J McGrath (1-2); P Flynn (0-2); M Breen, M Kehoe, W Connors, J Cahill, C Darcy (0-1 each).	Attendance: 1,628; Referee: T. Walsh (Waterford) P Maher; J O’Dwyer, B McGrath, C Morgan; A Flynn, B Heffernan, R Byrne; M Breen, P Cadell; M Kehoe, J McGrath, W Connors; J Cahill, J Forde, P Flynn; Subs: K O’Dwyer for J O’Dwyer (12 mins, inj); C Darcy for Cahill (53); J Ryan for Byrne (57); P Maher for Morgan (58); C Hammersley for Breen (69).

== 2020 National Hurling League ==
=== Summary ===
Tipperary started their league campaign on 25 January with an evening match against Limerick in Semple Stadium in front of 11,867, the game was televised live by Eir Sport. Tipperary began the match with 8 of the All Ireland winning fifteen but started the league campaign without the Borris-Ileigh players after there loss the week before in the All-Ireland Club Hurling Championship Final. They lost the game by 0–18 to 2-14 after having a nine-point lead at half-time 0–13 to 0-4 and then a ten-point lead early in the second half.

A week later on 1 February, Tipperary played Cork in the second round of the league at Páirc Uí Chaoimh, the game was televised live by Eir Sport and RTE 2. Cork won the game 2–24 to 1–25 in front of 9,821. Tipperary goalkeeper Brian Hogan scored a penalty, four minutes from the end of regulation time, to make it a one-point match, before Cork scored again late to win by two. John O'Dwyer went off late in the game with an injury which turned out to be nothing serious after visiting hospital

Tipperary traveled north to play Antrim in a challenge on 8 February before their third game of the league against Galway on 26 February. The Galway game was called off due to the effects of Storm Dennis.

On 23 February, Tipperary played Westmeath in round 3. The game was moved from Nenagh to Semple Stadium and Tipperary won the game on a 3–27 to 0-16 scoreline in front of 2436. They had a 2–14 to 0–07 lead at half-time after goals from Cian Darcy and Jake Morris.

On 1 March, Tipperary played Waterford in round 4 at Semple Stadium. The game was shown live on TG4. The previous week, seven players departed from the panel, Jason Ryan, Mark McCarthy, Killian O’Dwyer, Paul Maher (Moyne), Tom Fox, Conor Hammersley and Jamie Moloney. Two Waterford players, Austin Gleeson and Kevin Moran were sent off before Cathal Barrett was shown a red card in the first half after an umpire reported an off the ball incident with Dessie Hutchinson. Tipperary had an 0–14 to 1–8 lead at half time and went on to win by 0–24 to 2-16.

On 8 March, Tipperary played their rearranged and final group game against Galway in Pearse Stadium. The game was shown live on TG4. Playing with the wind in the first half, they had a 3–7 to 0–9 lead at half time after two goals from John McGrath and one from Jason Forde. McGrath got his first goal after three minutes when he cut in from the right before firing into the left corner of the net. His second came after 21 minutes when he received the ball on the left and cut in to place the ball past the goalkeeper from a tight angle into the right corner of the net. After 35 minutes, Forde scored his goal by shooting low to the right of the net after running in on goal from a pass by Cian Darcy. During some heavy rain showers in the second half, Galway came back with three goals to win by 3–21 to 3–13 in front of 5,750. With this defeat Tipperary failed to qualify for the quarter-finals. It is the first occasion that Tipperary failed to progress beyond the regulation rounds since knock-out was introduced in 2012.

=== Results ===
25 January
17:15
Round 1

Tipperary	0–18 – 2–14	Limerick
Jason Forde 0-10 (0-8f, 0-1 sideline), Jake Morris 0-3, John McGarth 0-3, Paddy Cadell 0-1, Willie Connors 0-1.	Report P Maher; C Barrett, R Maher, S O'Brien; B O'Mara, P Maher, S Kennedy; A Flynn, P Cadell; M Kehoe, J McGrath, M Breen; W Connors, J Forde, J Morris. Subs: P Flynn & D Quirke for Connors & Kehoe (55); C Morgan for Flynn (61); C Darcy for Breen (66); J Maloney for Kennedy 69)	Aaron Gillane 1-6 (0-4f, 0-1 sideline), David Dempsey 0-3, Gearoid Hegarty 1-0, Tom Morrissey 0-2, Diarmuid Byrnes 0-2 (0-1ff), Seamus Flanagan 0-1.

Semple Stadium, Thurles
Referee: Patrick Murphy (Carlow)
1 February
19:00
Round 2

Cork	2–24 – 1–25	Tipperary
Patrick Horgan 1-9 (0-8f, 1-0 pen), Robbie O’Flynn 1-3, Alan Cadogan 0-4, Darragh Fitzgibbon 0-2, Seamus Harnedy 0-2, Damien Cahalane 0-1, Aidan Walsh 0-1, Luke Meade 0-1, Mark Coleman 0-1.	Report Brian Hogan; Joe O’Dwyer, Ronan Maher, Sean O’Brien; Seamus Kennedy, Paudie Maher, Alan Flynn; Paddy Cadell, Willie Connors; Mark Kehoe, John McGrath, Michael Breen; Jason Forde, Jake Morris, Cian Darcy; Subs: Jerome Cahill for Cadell (27), Niall O’Meara for Breen (34), Seamus Callanan for Darcy (48), Bryan O’Mara for Kennedy (53), John O’Dwyer for Forde (65), Paul Flynn for John O’Dwyer (76).	Mark Kehoe 0-4, John McGrath 0-4, Jason Forde 0-4 (3f), Brian Hogan 1-0 (1-0 pen), Paudie Maher 0-3, Paddy Cadell 0-2, Jake Morris 0-2, Cian Darcy 0-2, Ronan Maher 0-1 (1f), Jerome Cahill 0-1, Niall O’Meara 0-1, Alan Flynn 0-1.

Páirc Uí Chaoimh, Cork
Referee: James Owens (Wexford)
23 February
14:00
Round 3

Tipperary	3–27 – 0–16	Westmeath
Jason Forde 0-14 (0-9f, 0-1sl), Jake Morris 1-3, Cian Darcy 1-1, Séamus Callanan 1-1, Ronan Maher 0-3, Alan Flynn 0-2, Michael Breen 0-2, Mark Kehoe 0-1.	Report Brian Hogan; Cathal Barrett, Barry Heffernan, Seán O’Brien; Séamus Kennedy, Ronan Maher, Bryan O’Mara; Alan Flynn, Michael Breen; Jason Forde, Séamus Callanan (c), Niall O’Meara; Cian Darcy, Jake Morris, Mark Kehoe; Subs used: Craig Morgan for Barrett (44), Noel McGrath for Kehoe (48), Dillon Quirke for O’Brien (48), Paul Flynn for O’Meara (56), Paddy Cadell for Kennedy (66).	Killian Doyle 0-7 (0-6f, 0-1 65), Allan Devine 0-5 (0-5f), Derek McNicholas 0-2, Aonghus Clarke 0-1, Ciarán Doyle 0-1.

Semple Stadium, Thurles
Referee: Patrick Murphy (Carlow)
1 March
14:00
Round 4

Tipperary	0–24 – 2–16	Waterford
Jason Forde 0-11 (5 ’65s, 4 frees); Dillon Quirke 0-4; Seamus Callanan, Padraic Maher 0-2 each; Cathal Barrett, Noel McGrath, John McGrath, Cian Darcy 0-1 each.	Report B Hogan; A Flynn, R Maher, C Barrett; B McGrath, P Maher, B Heffernan; M Breen, P Cadell; J Forde, S Callanan (c), N O'Meara, N McGrath, J McGrath, D Quirke; Subs: B O'Meara for B McGrath (42), J Morris for Breen (49), C Darcy for J McGrath (58), C Morgan for Flynn (61), P Flynn for O'Meara inj (62), Darcy for J McGrath blood (27-29)	Pauric Mahony 0-7 (6 frees); Peter Hogan 1-2; Stephen Bennett 1-1; Jamie Barron 0-2; Kevin Moran, Conor Gleeson, Dessie Hutchinson, Neil Montgomery 0-1 each.

Semple Stadium, Thurles
Referee: Sean Stack (Dublin)
8 March
14:00
Round 5

Galway	3–21 – 3–13	Tipperary
Evan Niland 0-14 (13f), Conor Whelan 2-0, Brian Concannon 0-4, Cathal Mannion 1-0, Jason Flynn 0-1 (sideline) Conor Cooney 0-1, Johnny Coen 0-1.	Report B Hogan; Paul Maher, B Hefferenan, R Maher; S Kennedy, Padraic Maher, A Flynn; N McGrath, G Browne; J Forde, S Callanan (c), D Quirke; J McGrath, J O’Dywer, D Darcy; Subs: M Breen for Browne, S O’Brien for Paul Maher (both 48 mins), P Flynn for O’Dwyer (57 mins), D McCormack for Quirke (59 mins), J Cahill for Darcy (69 mims).	John McGrath 2-1, Jason Forde 1-5, (0-2f, 0-2 ’65), Cian Darcy 0-2, Padraic Maher 0-1, Ronan Maher 0-1, Dillon Quirke 0-1, Seamus Callanan 0-1, Michael Breen 0-1.

Pearse Stadium, Galway
Referee: Johnny Murphy (Limerick)

== 2020 Munster Senior Hurling Championship ==
The 2020 Munster Championship was suspended due to the COVID-19 pandemic. GAA President John Horan speaking on 10 May said he could not see Gaelic games being played at any level while social distancing remains, with training activity of any kind banned until 20 July. The draws for the rescheduled Munster and Leinster Senior Hurling Championships took place live on RTÉ's Six One news on Friday 26 June.

Tipperary began their Munster Championship campaign against Limerick on 1 November.

=== Munster Championship Semi-final (v Limerick 1 November) ===
Tipperary played Limerick at Páirc Uí Chaoimh in the Munster Championship semi-final on 1 November. There were no spectators allowed due to COVID-19 and the game was played in very wet and windy conditions with near 50kmh winds. The Tipperary team named for the match showed Mark Kehoe coming into the half-forward line with Seán O'Brien named in the half back line. The match was televised live on RTÉ 2 as part of the Sunday Game presented by Joanne Cantwell with analysis by and Henry Shefflin and Donal Óg Cusack. Commentary on the game was provided by Ger Canning alongside Anthony Daly. Limerick played with the wind in the first half and had a 1-17 to 1-8 lead at half-time. The Tipperary goal was scored by Jake Morris after 18 minutes low to the net one handed after a pass from Séamus Callanan. John McGrath got Tipperary's second goal after 55 minutes, shooting low to the middle of the net past the diving goalkeeper after a pass from Noel McGrath where he appeared to pick the ball off the ground. Limerick's Aaron Gillane was named as the man of the match after scoring 2-6. Tipperary progressed into the All-Ireland qualifiers after this defeat with a match against Cork on 14 November.

1 November
16:00
Munster Semi-final

Tipperary	2–17 – 3–23	Limerick
Jason Forde 0-9 (0-9f), Jake Morris 1-1, John McGrath 1-0, Noel McGrath 0-2, Brendan Maher, Alan Flynn, Niall O’Meara, Michael Breen 0-1 each.	Report B Hogan; C Barrett, B Heffernan, S O’Brien; R Maher, B Maher, Padraic Maher; N McGrath, A Flynn; M Kehoe, J Forde, N O’Meara; J McGrath, S Callanan (c), J Morris; Subs – M Breen for Kehoe (45 mins), John Meagher for Padraic Maher (50 mins), D McCormack for O’Meara (54 mins), J O’Dwyer for Morris (61 mins), P Cadell for Heffernan (68 mins).	Aaron Gillane 2-6 (1-0 pen, 0-5f), Seamus Flanagan 1-1, Diarmaid Byrnes 0-3 (0-2f), Cian Lynch, William O’Donoghue, Gearoid Hegarty, Graeme Mulcahy, Tom Morrissey 0-2 each, Peter Casey, David Reidy, Pat Ryan 0-1 each.

Páirc Uí Chaoimh, Cork
Referee: Liam Gordon (Galway)

== 2020 All-Ireland Senior Hurling Championship ==
The 2020 All-Ireland Championship was suspended due to the COVID-19 pandemic, but commenced in October 2020. After the defeat to Limerick in the Munster Semi-final, Tipperary went into the qualifiers. After the first round draw on 2 November, Tippeary received a bye into the second round. The second round draw was held on 9 November with Tipperary drawn against Cork.

=== All-Ireland Qualifier Round 2 (v Cork 14 November) ===
Tipperary played Cork on 14 November in round 2 of the All-Ireland qualifiers. There were no spectators allowed again for this match due to COVID-19 and the game was again played in very wet and windy conditions. The Tipperary team named for the match showed Niall O'Meara coming into the half back line. The match was televised live on Sky Sports with analysis from Jamesie O'Connor, JJ Delaney and Ollie Canning. Commentary on the game was provided by Nicky English. Tipperary played with the wind in the first half and had a 0-9 to 1-4 lead at half-time, Patrick Horgan got the goal for Cork in the 22nd minute when he ran in on goal to score with a low shot past the dive of Brian Hogan into the left corner. Weather conditions improved in the second half and the first Tipperary goal was scored by Jason Forde in the 41st minute with a shot to the right corner to the net after he got away on the right from Damien Cahalane. Jake Morris got the clinching score with the second goal in the 68th minute, running in on goal before shooting low to the right of the net after a pass from Willie Connors. Tipperary progressed into the All-Ireland quarter-finals where they would meet Galway on 21 November. Michael Breen was named man of the match.

14 November
16:00
All-Ireland Qualifier Round 2

Tipperary	2–18 – 1–17	Cork
Jason Forde 1-6 (5fs), Michael Breen 0-5, Jake Morris 1-0, Seamus Callanan, Dan McCormack, and Paul Flynn 0-2 each, Willie Connors 0-1.	Report Brian Hogan; Cathal Barrett, Ronan Maher, Alan Flynn; Niall O’Meara, Brendan Maher, Padraic Maher; Noel McGrath, Michael Breen; Dan McCormack, John McGrath, Patrick Maher; Jason Forde, Seamus Callanan (c), Jake Morris; Subs: Willie Connors for J McGrath (33), Paul Flynn for P Maher (53), Paddy Cadell for N McGrath (59), Dillon Quirke for Forde (70+3).	Patrick Horgan 1-8 (7fs, 165), Seamus Harnedy 0-4, Tim O’Mahony, Bill Cooper, Shane Kingston, Robbie O’Flynn, and Declan Dalton 0-1 each.

Gaelic Grounds, Limerick
Referee: James Owens (Wexford)

=== All-Ireland Quarter-Final (v Galway 21 November) ===
Tipperary played Galway on 21 November in the All-Ireland Quarter-finals. There were no spectators allowed again for this match due to COVID-19 and the game was played in dry sunny conditions. The Tipperary team was named the night before with no changes from the Cork match. The match was televised live on RTÉ 2 as part of the Sunday Game presented by Joanne Cantwell with analysis by and Henry Shefflin and Derek McGrath. Commentary on the game was provided by Ger Canning alongside Brendan Cummins. Tipperary were leading at half-time by 2-13 to 2-9. The first Tipperary goal came from captain Séamus Callanan after four minutes when he cut in from the left after Daithí Burke had slipped and shot low to the right of the net. In the 11th minute Cathal Mannion got past Niall O'Meara and shot to the net from a tight angle on the left. In the 21st minute, Brian Concannon got a second goal for Galway when he shot to the net from the right. Patrick ‘Bonner’ Maher scored Tipperary's second goal in the 32nd minute at the second attempt after his initial shot rebounded to him, shooting low to the net at the town end. Cathal Barrett was sent off in the 52nd minute after receiving a second yellow card for a foul on Brian Concannon. Galway got a third goal in the 66th minute when Aidan Harte shot low into the right-hand corner of the net to put Galway into a one point lead. Galway held on to win by two points.

21 November
13:15
All-Ireland Quarter-Final

Tipperary	2–24 – 3–23	Galway
Jason Forde 0-6 (5f), Noel McGrath 0-4, Seamus Callanan 1-2 (1f), Patrick Maher 1-0, McCormack 0-2, Alan Flynn 0-2, Michael Breen 0-2, Jake Morris 0-1, Niall O’Meara 0-1, Ronan Maher 0-1(1f), Brian Hogan 0-1 (1f), Barry Heffernan 0-1, Willie Connors 0-1	Report Brian Hogan; Cathal Barrett, Ronan Maher, Brendan Maher; Barry Heffernan, Pádraic Maher, Niall O’Meara; Alan Flynn, Michael Breen; Dan McCormack, Noel McGrath, Patrick Maher; Jason Forde, Seamus Callanan (c), Jake Morris; Subs: Willie Connors for Patrick Maher (50), John McGrath for Noel McGrath (53), Paddy Cadell for Niall O’Meara (58), Paul Flynn for Jason Forde (65), Mark Kehoe for Dan McCormack (73)	Joe Canning 0-14 (12f, 1’sl), Cathal Mannion 1-3, Brian Concannon 1-0, Aidan Harte 1-0, Conor Cooney 0-1, Joseph Cooney 0-1, Johnny Coen 0-1, Sean Loftus 0-1, Jason Flynn 0-1, Conor Whelan 0-1

Gaelic Grounds, Limerick
Referee: Johnny Murphy (Limerick)

== Awards ==
The PwC All-Star Awards

The nominations for the PwC All-Stars were announced on 16 January 2021 with Tipperary receiving two nominations in the 45-player shortlist, Ronan Maher and Michael Breen. Jake Morris was also nominated for the Young Hurler of the Year. The awards show was held on 20 February with no award wins for Tipperary.

== Retirements ==
On 11 December, Sean O'Brien announced his retirement from inter-county hurling.
