= Paul Maher =

Paul Maher may refer to:

- Paul Maher Jr. (born 1963), American author, book critic, photographer and filmmaker
- Paul Maher (footballer) (born 1976), Australian rules footballer
- Paul Maher (Moyne–Templetuohy hurler), Irish hurler
- Paul Maher (Kilsheelan–Kilcash hurler), Irish hurler
