= Kevin O'Halloran (disambiguation) =

Kevin O'Halloran (1937–1976) was an Australian swimmer.

Kevin O'Halloran may also refer to:

- Kevin O'Halloran (Australian rules footballer) (1915–1976), Australian rules footballer
- Kevin O'Halloran (Gaelic footballer) (born 1994), Irish Gaelic footballer
