= John Sheedy =

Irish hurler

Personal information
- Native name: Seán Ó Síoda (Irish)
- Born: 1959 (age 66–67) Portroe, County Tipperary, Ireland

Sport
- Sport: Hurling
- Position: Goalkeeper
Club
- Years: Club
- Portroe
Club titles
- Tipperary titles: 0
Inter-county
Years	County	Apps (scores)
1983-1985	Tipperary	7 (0-00)
Inter-county titles
- Munster titles: 0
- All-Irelands: 0
- NHL: 0
- All Stars: 0

John Sheedy (born 1959) is an Irish retired hurler who played as a goalkeeper with the Tipperary senior team.

Born in Portroe, County Tipperary, Sheedy first arrived on the inter-county scene at the age of seventeen when he first linked up with the Tipperary minor team, before later joining the under-21 hurling and junior teams. He made his senior debut during the 1983 championship. Sheedy had a brief career with Tipperary at senior level, making 7 championship appearances for Tipperary. His retirement came following the conclusion of the 1985 championship.

His brother, Liam Sheedy, also played with Tipperary and is an All-Ireland-winning manager.

At club level Sheedy had a lengthy career with Portroe.

In retirement from playing, Sheedy became involved in team management and coaching. He was a selector with the Tipperary minor and intermediate team, while he has also been involved as a coach with club side Portroe.

== Honours ==
=== Team ===
Tipperary

- All-Ireland Junior Hurling Championship (1): 1989
- Munster Junior Hurling Championship (1): 1988, 1989
- All-Ireland Under-21 Hurling Championship (1): 1979 (sub), 1980 (sub)
- Munster Under-21 Hurling Championship (1): 1979 (sub), 1980 (sub)
