= 2010 Tipperary county hurling team season =

Tipperary county hurling team
2010 season
Manager	Liam Sheedy
All-Ireland SHC	Winners
Munster SHC	Quarter-finalist
National League	Third in Division 1
Top scorer	Eoin Kelly (3-44)
Highest SHC attendance	81,765 vs Kilkenny
- Lowest SHC attendance
Standard colours

In 2010 Tipperary claimed their twenty sixth All-Ireland Senior Hurling Championship title after a 4–17 to 1–18 win against Kilkenny in the final at Croke Park, Dublin on 5 September.

== Tipperary senior hurling squad 2010 ==
- Statistics correct to the end of 2010 Season

Name	Position	Club	Age	Apps	Goals	Points
Brendan Cummins	1. Goalkeeper	Ballybacon-Grange	34	61	0	1
Darren Gleeson	1. Goalkeeper	Portroe	28	1	0	0
Paul Curran	2. Full back	Mullinahone	28	32	0	0
Declan Fanning	2. Full back	Killenaule	31	29	0	1
Pádraic Maher	2. Full back	Thurles Sarsfields	20	10	0	0
Paddy Stapleton	2. Full back	Borrisoleigh	24	10	0	0
David Young	2. Full back	Toomevara	24	4	0	4
Michael Heffernan	2. Full back	Éire Óg, Nenagh	20	1	0	0
Conor O'Brien	2. Full back	Éire Óg Anacarty	25	10	0	0
Michael Cahill	2. Half back	Thurles Sarsfields	21	5	0	0
Conor O'Mahoney	3. Half back	Newport	25	27	0	6
Brendan Maher	3. Half back	Borris-Ileigh	20	10	0	5
Shane Maher	3. Half back	Burgess	28	7	0	1
Shane McGrath	4. Midfield	Ballinahinch	25	23	0	17
Benny Dunne	4. Midfield	Toomevara	29	35	4	29
Séamus Hennessy	4. Midfield	Kilruane MacDonaghs	20	3	0	1
Patrick 'Bonnar' Maher	4. Midfield	Lorrha-Dorrha	20	4	0	3
Hugh Maloney	4. Midfield	Éire Óg, Nenagh	26	18	0	5
Gearóid Ryan	4. Midfield	Templederry Kenyons	21	7	1	9
James Woodlock	4. Midfield	Drom-Inch GAA	23	12	0	5
Pat Kerwick	5. Half forward	Killenaule	27	8	1	10
Séamus Callinan	5. Half forward	Drom-Inch GAA	21	13	6	20
Paddy Fanning	5. Half forward	Moneygall	24	0	0	0
Pa Bourke	5. Half forward	Thurles Sarsfields	22	9	0	1
John O'Brien	5. Half forward	Toomevara	27	21	2	28
Darragh Egan	5. Half forward	Kildangan	24	12	3	8
Jody Brennan	5. Half forward	Upperchurch-Drombane	26	1	0	0
Paul Kelly	5. Half forward	Mullinahone	30	36	1	48
Timmy Hammersley	6. Full forward	Clonoulty Rossmore	22	1	0	1
Noel McGrath	6. Full forward	Loughmore-Castleiney	19	10	1	29
Eoin Kelly	6. Full forward	Mullinahone	28	48	17	319
Lar Corbett	6. Full forward	Thurles Sarsfields	28	42	16	58
Brian O'Meara	6. Full forward	Kilruane MacDonaghs	20	2	0	0

=== Management Team ===
Name	Position	Club
Liam Sheedy	Manager	Portroe
Michael Ryan	Selector	Upperchurch-Drombane
Éamonn O'Shea	Selector	Kilruane MacDonaghs
Cian O'Neill	Trainer	Moorefield

== Season summary ==
=== 2010 Waterford Crystal Cup ===
On 26 January, Tipperay started the new hurling year with a 1–12 to 0-17 point defeat to Clare in Borrisoleigh in the Waterford Crystal Cup Quarter-Final. The game was physical from the throw in and Clare dominated the majority of the game. Clare put over many brilliant scorers with Tipperary managing to keep in touch at half time, 0–10 to 0–6. Liam Sheedy decided to make some changes, bringing on Lar Corbett, Micheal Webster and Noel McGrath. Tipperary never got within a point of Clare during the game. Eoin Kelly also missed a penalty chance at goal. Tipp's Noel McGrath got the only goal and Tipperary were back within 2 points. Clare's backs never looked like being beaten and Tipperary got the last point of the game.

=== 2010 National Hurling League ===
After Tipp's first-round game of the 2010 National Hurling League against Kilkenny called off twice due to bad weather, Tipps first game was against Dublin on 28 February in Parnell Park. Tipperary started the game by scoring a penalty in the first minute. Dublin then got 6 points in a row to gain a lead they did not surrender. The first half was evenly fought with both teams hitting over points with Dublin keeping their lead The first sight of the new rules was evident as Dublin got a goal by knocking the ball out of Tipperary goalie Darren Gleeson's hands, which would have been called as a 'square ball' if the new rules were not in place. The second half began with Dublin taking the game and pulling away. Tipperary and Dublin both scorned goal chances and both tems hitting many wides. The game ended 1–21 to 1–12.

Tipperary finally got their first-round game against Kilkenny underway on 7 March 2010. Tipperary started off well, matching Kilkenny point for point. Eoin Kelly putting over all his frees. It was a low scoring first half, with both teams putting over 6 points each. With a minute to go in the first half, Eoin Kelly got the ball and turned to his right, putting the ball in the back of the Kilkenny net to make it 1–6 to 0–6. Kilkenny got two points straight after the resumption, but Tipperary kept putting over the points. Tipperary never relinquished the lead. With ten minutes to go, A me-lee started by the players escalated into a confrontation between manager's Brian Cody and Liam Sheedy, but the referee Barry Kelly quickly handled the situation. Tipperary made it 1–13 to 0-13 near the finish and sub Jody Brennan put over the insurance point at the death, Tipperary winning 1–14 to 0–13.

Tipperary got their third league game underway against Galway in Semple Stadium on 14 March. Tipperary started out by giving away two early points, but a lucky goal from the '65 from Eoin Kelly, doubled on by John O'Brien and a point put them ahead. Galway still had the edge over Tipperary and got into a 0–8 to 1–1 lead. Tipperary finished off the half stronger, bring their deficit to 4 points, 0–13 to 1–6. The second half was much different for both teams. Tipperary hit three consecutive points, before Noel McGrath scored their second goal, leading 2–9 to 0–13. Galway then scored their first and only point of the second half, but Eoin Kelly hitting two more points to see a 2–12 to 0–14 lead. Tipperary got five more points to close off the game, beating Galway 2–17 to 0–14.

Tipp's 4th-round game was against Limerick in the Gaelic Grounds, Limerick. The game started off with Tipperary and Limerick getting their opening points early on, but the contest ended there. Tipperary went to score a goal after 25 minutes when Timmy Hammersley rasped in a shot. The half time score 1–10 to 0–2. The second half began with Limerick player Dean Madden being sent off and then substitute John O'Brien scored Tipperary's second goal, to make it 2–15 to 0–2. Tipperary continued to hit points, but Limerick also hit six points in the second half. The score ended 2–24 to 0–8.

Tipp's 5th-round game was against Waterford in Semple Stadium on 28 March. The game was 0–2 to 0–0 at 7 minutes with Tipperary getting the first point nearly 10 minutes into the first half. Timmy Hammersley scored to bring it to a point. Tipperary led by three points 0–9 to 0–6, before Stephen Molumphy scored the goal for Waterford to level it up. The first half ended with Tipperary leading by a point, 0–13 to 1–9. The second half started out at blistering, near championship pace. Noel McGrath missed a penalty to put Tipperary ahead but Noel McGrath made up for it with another strike later on, this time it was a goal. Waterford kept answering back with a well-struck 20 metre free from Eoin Kelly, which landed in the net. Tipperary led by a point in the closing stages, but Eoin Kelly from Waterford slotted over a free to level it up. The referee, who added one minute of injury time, didn't play the minute and blew it up. The final score was 1–19 to 2–16.

Tipp's 6th-round game was against Cork in Páirc Uí Chaoimh on 4 April. Cork started off the better, getting two opening points, but Eoin Kelly levelled it up with two frees. Cork then took a four-point lead, 0–6 to 0–2. Both exchanged points, but Cork finished the half the stronger with a 0–11 to 0–7 scoreline, their last point coming from a free that resulted from a controversial line ball. The second half began with Tipperary the stronger. Cork keeper Martin Coleman saved a rasping shot from Lar Corbett with Eoin Kelly failing to put in the rebound. Shane McGrath and Eoin Kelly scoring two points to put it 0–11 to 0–9. Two quick points from Paul Kelly resulted in 0-11 tally each, before Gearoid Ryan putting over the leading score. Paul Kelly then took on a massive run, running past the Cork backs before hitting a low shot into Cork's net to make it 1–12 to 0–11. Cork quickly responded with a shot saved by Brendan Cummins, but a good piece of skill saw Pat Horgan sending in the rebound. Cork quickly equalized, but Tipperary kept putting over points. Cork finally got the leading score and then led by two with a great run from Shane O'Neill resulting in a scored free. Tipperary brought it back to a point game, but couldn't find the equalizer. Cork winning the game 1–16 to 1–15.

Tipp's 7th and last round game was against Offaly in O'Connor Park, Tullamore on 18 April. Tipperary started off well, getting a 0–4 to 0–2 lead, but Tipperary and Offaly traded points afterwards. The game was close and at half time, the score was 0–11 to 0–7. The second half started out with Offaly taking the initiative and putting over the points. Tipperary stayed ahead, but Offay's Shane Dooley got a goal. Tipperary were two points behind, but soon conceded another Shane Dooley goal within 2 minutes of his first one. Tipperary started putting over points to bring the deficit down to two points. With injury time almost up, Tipperary got a free on the 20 metre line. Seamus Callanan stepped up to take it. Only a goal would win the match, seeing as when the ball would go over a boundary, the game would be over. He took the ball and struck it low into the net to give Tipperary a one-point win and third place in the league table.

=== Division 1 ===
==== Table ====
Team	Pld	W	D	L	F	A	Diff	Pts
Galway (C)	7	6	0	1	11–124	8–112	+21	12
Cork	7	5	1	1	9–124	10–101	+20	11
Tipperary	7	4	1	2	9–118	6–102	+25	9
Kilkenny	7	4	0	3	8–124	5–116	+17	8
Waterford	7	3	2	2	14–115	12–109	+12	8
Offaly	7	2	0	5	10–107	9–129	–19	4
Dublin	7	2	0	5	9–130	12–110	+11	4
Limerick (R)	7	0	0	7	9–83	17–146	–87	0

- Kilkenny were placed ahead of Waterford as they won the head-to-head match between the teams (18 April at Nowlan Park: 1–20 to 2–12)
- Offaly were placed ahead of Dublin as they won the head-to-head match between the teams (14 March at O'Connor Park: 3–19 to 1–18)

==== Results ====
20 February 2010; 7:30 p.m.	Tipperary	Postponed	Kilkenny	Semple Stadium, Thurles

23 February 2010; 7:00 p.m.	Tipperary	Postponed	Kilkenny	Semple Stadium, Thurles

28 February 2010; 2:30 p.m. Round 2	Dublin	1–21 – 1–12	Tipperary	Parnell Park, Donnycarney; Referee: J. Owens (Wexford).
28 February 2010; 2:30 p.m. Round 2	A McCrabbe 0-10 (0-8f, 0-1 65), J McCaffrey 1-1, S Durkin, P Kelly 0-2 each, L Rushe, M OBrien, S Lambert, D Tracey, K Flynn 0-1 each	Report	E Kelly 1-5 (1-0 pen, 0-2f, 0-1 65), S Callinan 0-2, B Dunne, S Hennessy, N McGrath, L Corbett, D Fanning 0-1 each	Parnell Park, Donnycarney; Referee: J. Owens (Wexford).

7 March 2010; 2:30 p.m.	Tipperary	1-14 - 0-13	Kilkenny	Semple Stadium, Thurles; Attendance: 20,254; Referee: B. Kelly (Westmeath)
7 March 2010; 2:30 p.m.	E Kelly 1-7 (0-6f), S McGrath 0-2, L Corbett 0-2, N McGrath, J O'Brien, J Brennan 0-1 each	Report	J Tennyson 0-3, J Mulhall 0-3, R Hogan 0-3 (0-3f), E Larkin, M Rice, T Walsh, J Tyrell 0-1 each	Semple Stadium, Thurles; Attendance: 20,254; Referee: B. Kelly (Westmeath)

14 March 2010; 2:30 p.m.	Tipperary	2-17 - 0-14	Galway	Semple Stadium, Thurles; Referee: J. Sexton (Cork)
14 March 2010; 2:30 p.m.	E Kelly 0-5 (0-4f), L Corbett 0-4, S Callanan 0-4, N McGrath 1-1, J O'Brien 1-0, T Hammersley 0-2, S McGrath 0-1	Report	G Farragher 0-5 (0-4f), C Donnellan, A Callanan, I Tannian 0-2 each, A Harte, N Cahalan, J Gantley 0-1 each.	Semple Stadium, Thurles; Referee: J. Sexton (Cork)

21 March 2010; 2:30 p.m.	Limerick	0–8 – 2–24	Tipperary	Gaelic Grounds, Limerick; Referee: M. Wadding (Waterford)
21 March 2010; 2:30 p.m.	P McNamara (0-2f), G Mulcahy 0-2 each, B O'Sullivan, P Browne, R McKeogh, A Owens 0-1 each	Report	T Hammersley 1-4 (0-1f), S Hennessy 0-6, J O'Brien 1-2, E Kelly 0-5 (0-3f, 1'65), G Ryan, M Webster, J Devane 0-2, M Heffernan 0-1	Gaelic Grounds, Limerick; Referee: M. Wadding (Waterford)

28 March 2010; 2:30 p.m.	Tipperary	1–19 – 2–16	Waterford	Semple Stadium, Thurles; Referee: C. McAllister (Cork)
28 March 2010; 2:30 p.m.	T Hammersley 0-6 (4f, 1'65), L Corbett 0-4, N McGrath 1-1, B Maher, G Ryan, P Kelly 0-2 each, J O'Brien, S Hennessy 0-1 each	Report	E Kelly 1-7 (1-7f), S Molumphy 1-1, S O'Sullivan 0-3, D Shanahan 0-2, J Nagle, S Prendergast, J Mullane 0-1 each	Semple Stadium, Thurles; Referee: C. McAllister (Cork)

4 April 2010; 2:30 p.m.	Cork	1–16 – 1–15	Tipperary	Páirc Uí Chaoimh, Cork; Referee: J. McGrath (Westmeath)
4 April 2010; 2:30 p.m.	P Horgan 1-7 (6f), C Naughton 0-3, T Kenny, J O'Connor 0-2 each, L McLoughlin, J Gardiner (f) 0-1 each	Report	E Kelly 0-6 (5f), P Kelly 1-2, N McGrath 0-3, G Ryan 0-2, S McGrath, D Egan 0-1 each	Páirc Uí Chaoimh, Cork; Referee: J. McGrath (Westmeath)

18 April 2010; 2:30 p.m.	Offaly	2–14 – 1–18	Tipperary	O'Connor Park, Tullamore; Referee: B. Kelly (Westmeath)
18 April 2010; 2:30 p.m.	S Dooley 2-6 (0-3f, 0-1 ‘65), D Currams, J Bergin 0-2 each, R Hanniffy, S Kelly, C Parlon, B Carroll 0-1 each.	Report	E Kelly 0-7 (0-2f, 0-1 pen, 0-1 ‘65), S Callanan 1-2 (1-2f), S McGrath, S Hennessy 0-2 each, Padraic Maher, J Brennan, D Egan, M Heffernan, P Kerwick 0-1 each.	O'Connor Park, Tullamore; Referee: B. Kelly (Westmeath)

=== 2010 All-Ireland Senior Hurling Championship ===
Tipperary started out their Munster championship campaign against Cork in Páirc Uí Chaoimh on 30 May. The winner had the chance of playing Limerick in the semi-final, which was a mismatch for both teams. In a competitive sense, a Munster semi-final. Tipperary started out getting a point in the opening few minute, but Cork soon replied. Tipperary got two more points to make it a 0–3 to 0–1 lead, but Cork soon led. With just 13 minutes gone, Aisike O'hAilpin caught a ball above Padraig Maher and was brought down for a penalty. Pat Horgan had taken a penalty last year, but missed. This year he did the opposite and gave Cork a 1–1 to 0–3 lead. Lar Corbett had a chance beforehand to score a goal, but a great Save from Donal Óg sent it for a 65'. Cork then got two more points to get a three-point lead. Just a few minutes later, Cork was up again and Pat Horgan cracked in another fine goal to give Cork a 2–5 to 0–9 lead at half time. Tipperary reduced the lead back to a point, but Cork answered them again. Cork then scored five points on the trot before Tipperary scored again. With 10 minutes remaining, Cork's Jerry O'Connor gave a handpass to a free Aisike O'hAilpin who drove the ball into the net for the killing blow. Tipperary scored only a small four points in the second half to be beaten by the Rebel's, 3–15 to 0-14 points.

Tipp's qualifier round 1 game was against Wexford in Semple Stadium on 3 July. The winner would go on while the loser's championship would be ended prematurely. Tipperary started off well, and by half time they were 0–15 to 0–7 up. Right after the second half began, the game was effectively killed with two goals from Lar Corbett plus two points from play. The pace of the game slowed down and Tipperary ran the game out winners on the scoreline 3–24 to 0–19.

Tipp's qualifier round 3 game was against Offaly in O'Moore Park, Portlaoise on 18 July. The winner would be back in an All-Ireland quarter final. Tipperary and Offaly both started well, but Tipperary started putting more points away and were leading by six points, 0–7 to 0–1 after 20 minutes. Tipperary finished out the half with a 9-point lead, 0–14 to 0-5 points. Offaly battled hard in the second half, but Tipperary kept putting away the points and never relinquished the lead below 8 points until the final minute of the game, when the Tipperary backs were caught off guard and Offaly slotted home a goal to put the deficit to 6. The final score 0–21 to 1–12 to Tipp.

Tipperary were back in Croke park once again for their All-Ireland quarter final clash with Galway. The game started out at a blistering pace with Tipperary and Galway getting scores. It was 0–4 to 0-1 till Galway's Eanna Ryan made it 0–4 to 1–1 with a goal. It was point for point till the score was 1–3 to 0-6 then 'Bonnar' Maher caught a great ball and hand-passed it off to Eoin Kelly who finished it to give Tipperary a 1–6 to 1–3 lead. Galway kept fighting back and staying in the game. Galway gained a three-point lead, but points from Kelly and Brendan Maher brought it down to one before substitute Seamus Callinan blasted home a goal to make it 2–8 to 1–9 at half time. Galway had more fight in them and gained the lead once more thanks to a goal from Damien Hayes after a bad mistake from Paul Curran. Tipperary battled back and the score was 2-10 a piece before Gearoid Ryan got Tipperary the lead 3–10 to 2–10. Galway then got a penalty and Joe Canning stepped up and scored. Galway put over the points and were two points ahead with 5 minutes to go. Substitute John O'Brien scored a point and Gearoid added his point to tie it up with a minute to go. Other sub Pa Bourke got the ball on the 21-metre line and headed for goal before turning back and giving the ball to Lar Corbett. Lar Corbett put it over the bar for the lead. Galway had one minute to get an equalising point and had the ball 21 metres out and there was a ruckus with many players from each team fighting for the ball with a Galway man lying on top of the ball. The ref deemed the ball wasn't going anywhere and blew up. Tipperary won 3–17 to 3–16.

Tipp's semifinal against Waterford was on 15 August in Croke Park. The match started off very evenly with both teams going point for point up until they were 0-5 each. Tipperary got a point before striking a goal from Lar Corbett, putting Tipperary 5 points ahead. Waterford got some points, but the half finished Tipperary 1–11 Waterford 0–8. Waterford started out the half strong and got the deficit back to three points, 1–12 to 0–12. However that was the closest they were going to get as Tipperary scored another goal, this time Eoin Kelly. Tipperary got more points and another goal from Eoin Kelly sealed the deal. With the game over before 5 minutes to go, Waterford snuck in and got a consolation goal from Eoin McGrath. The game ending on the score Tipperary 3–19, Waterford 1–18.

Tipperary reached the All-Ireland final for their second time in a row to face last year's opponents Kilkenny on 5 September. The match began well as Kilkenny struggled for some time when they lost Henry Shefflin through injury. Tipperary got a goal in the tenth minute struck by Lar Corbett which gave Tipperary a 5-point lead. Kilkenny did have a goal chance soon afterwards but was comfortably dealt with by Brendan Cummins. Kilkenny however got back in the game with points from Richie Power. Power scored Kilkenny's only goal just before half-time, but Tipperary made sure Kilkenny never got the lead and Tipperary went in at half-time Tipperary 1–10 Kilkenny 1–9. Kilkenny began the second half with points from Richie Power and the captain T.J. Reid to level up the game. However, Kilkenny never led as Tipperary regained points by captain Eoin Kelly before Lar Corbett struck Tipp's second goal in the 41st minute. Two minutes later, Noel Mcgrath fired Tipp's third goal past P.J. Ryan to certainly Kilkenny's 5 in a row. With under 3 minutes to go, Lar Corbett struck his third goal of the match and it ended Tipperary 4–17 Kilkenny 1-18 and Tipperary were crowned All-Ireland champions for the first time in nine years.

=== Munster Senior Hurling Championship ===
30 May 2010
Quarter-final

Cork	3-15 - 0-14	Tipperary
P Horgan 2-2, B O'Connor 0-5, A Ó hAilpín 1-1, J Gardiner, C Naughton, N McCarthy 0-2 each, P O'Sullivan 0-1	Report	E Kelly 0-7, J O'Brien, L Corbett 0-2 each, B Maher, S Callanan, T Hammersley 0-1 each

Páirc Uí Chaoimh, Cork
Attendance: 36,827
Referee: B. Kelly (Westmeath)

=== All-Ireland Qualifiers ===
3 July 2010
Phase 1

Tipperary	3-24 - 0-19	Wexford
L Corbett 2-3, E Kelly 0-8, G Ryan 0-4, D Egan 1-0, D Young, N McGrath 0-3 each, P Maher 0-2, S Callanan 0-1	Report	H Kehoe, R Jacob, J Berry, C Farrell 0-3 each, P Atkinson, S Banville, T Mahon 0-2 each, D Stamp 0-1

Semple Stadium, Thurles
Referee: J McGrath (Westmeath)

18 July 2010
Phase 3

Offaly	1-12 - 0-21	Tipperary
S Dooley 1-7, J Bergin 0-3, D Molloy, D Hayden 0-1 each	Report	E Kelly 0-11, G Ryan 0-3, L Corbett, B Maher 0-2 each, C O'Mahony, S McGrath, N McGrath 0-1 each

O'Moore Park, Portlaoise
Referee: J. Sexton (Cork)

=== All-Ireland Senior Hurling Championship ===
25 July 2010
Quarter-final

Galway	3-16 - 3-17	Tipperary
J Canning 1-5, D Hayes 1-3, E Ryan 1-1, G Farragher, K Hynes 0-2 each, D Burke, I Tannian, A Callanan 0-1 each	Report	E Kelly 1-7, G Ryan 1-2, S Callanan 1-0, L Corbett 0-3, B Maher 0-2, P Maher, N McGrath, J O'Brien 0-1 each

Croke Park, Dublin
Attendance: 27,864
Referee: J. Owens (Wexford)

15 August 2010
Semi-final

Waterford	1-18 - 3-19	Tipperary
E Kelly 0-5, T Browne, J Mullane, K McGrath 0-3 each, E McGrath 1-0, R Foley, K Moran, S Molumphy, S Prendergast 0-1 each	Report	E Kelly 2-4, J O'Brien, N McGrath 0-6 each, L Corbett 1-2, S McGrath 0-1

Croke Park, Dublin
Attendance: 49,754
Referee: J. Sexton (Cork)

5 September 2010
Final

Kilkenny	1-18 - 4-17	Tipperary
R Power 1-9, TJ Reid 0-4, M Rice, J Mulhall, H Shefflin, A Fogarty 0-1 each	Report	L Corbett 3-0, E Kelly 0-7, N McGrath 1-0, J O'Brien, B Maher, S Callanan 0-2 each, G Ryan, S Hennessy, B Cummins, B Dunne 0-1 each

Croke Park, Dublin
Attendance: 81,765
Referee: M. Wadding (Waterford)

=== All Ireland Homecoming ===
The Tipperary team arrived back to Thurles by train on 6 September after the traditional stop at Our Ladies Children's Hospital with the Cup earlier in the day. They then boarded an open top bus for the journey to the reception at Semple Stadium where an estimated 40,000 supporters turned out to welcome the team home to a rainy Thurles. There was another huge crowd in Mullinahone the night after when Eoin Kelly, the first south Tipperary man to captain Tipperary to All-Ireland senior success, brought the cup home.

=== Awards ===
The nominations for the 2010 GAA All Stars Awards were announced on 24 September 2010. Tipperary had 14 players nominated for awards, winning captain Eoin Kelly was going for his sixth All-Star while final hat-trick scorer Lar Corbett was hoping to pick up his second award. At the awards ceremony on 15 October 2010, Tipperary won six All Star awards, Brendan Cummins, Paul Curran, Brendan Maher, Noel McGrath, Lar Corbett and Eoin Kelly won awards. Lar Corbett was named All Stars Hurler of the year while Brendan Maher collected the All Stars Young hurler of the year award.

Tipperary's Lar Corbett and Brendan Maher were also shortlisted for the GPA Hurler of the Year award for 2010. On 5 November, Corbett was named as the GPA Hurler of the year for 2010, and received a new Opel Astra car worth €25,000. Corbett and Maher were joined in the nominations for the GPA team of the year by ten of their Tipperary teammates. Tipperary won seven places on the GPA team of the year, all of their All Star award winners in addition to Pádraic Maher who was named at left-half back, replacing Kilkenny's JJ Delaney in the only difference to the 2010 All Star team.

=== Aftermath ===
On 11 September 2010, six days after the Senior final, the Tipperary Under-21 Hurling team completed the double by winning the All-Ireland Under-21 Hurling Championship against Galway by 5–22 to 0–12 at Semple Stadium to claim their ninth title. Five members of the victorious senior starting team started for Tipperary in the Under-21 final, Pádraic Maher, Michael Cahill, Brendan Maher, Noel McGrath, and Patrick Maher. Senior substitutes Séamus Hennessy, Brian O'Meara and Michael Heffernan also started for the Under-21 team.

On 7 October 2010 it was announced that Liam Sheedy would be stepping down from his position as the Tipperary manager. Sheedy and his selectors, who found themselves working up to 16 hours a day during their three-year term, cited work commitments as the reason for stepping down and Sheedy thanked the board for their "top class" support. In December 2010, Sheedy was named the Philips Sports Manager of the Year for 2010 for managing Tipperary to their All Ireland win. In November 2010, Tipperary half back Declan Fanning announced his retirement from inter-county hurling.
