= Robert Byrne (hurler) =

Irish hurler

Personal information
- Native name: Riobeard Ó Broin (Irish)
- Born: 1997 (age 28–29) Portroe, County Tipperary, Ireland
- Occupation: Model
- Height: 6 ft 11 in (211 cm)

Sport
- Sport: Hurling and basketball
- Position: Left wing-back
Club
- Years: Club
- Portroe
Club titles
- Tipperary titles: 0
College
- Years: College
- 2016-present: Limerick Institute of Technology
College titles
- Fitzgibbon titles: 0
Inter-county*
Years	County	Apps (scores)
2019-present	Tipperary	4 (0-0)
Inter-county titles
- Munster titles: 0
- All-Irelands: 0
- NHL: 0
- All Stars: 12
- *Inter County team apps and scores correct as of 15:34, 30 August 2019.

Robert Byrne (born 1997) is an Irish hurler who plays for Tipperary Senior Championship club Portroe and at inter-county level with the Tipperary senior hurling team. He usually lines out on the bench.

== Playing career ==
=== Nenagh CBS ===
Byrne first came to prominence as a hurler with Nenagh CBS. He played in all grades before joining the school's senior team and made several appearances in the Dr. Harty Cup.

=== Limerick Institute of Technology ===
After lining out for the Limerick Institute of Technology freshers' team in his first year, Byrne made his first appearance in the Fitzgibbon Cup on 22 January 2018. He was at midfield for LIT's 3–15 to 2–17 defeat by DCU Dóchas Éireann.

=== Portroe ===
Byrne joined the Portroe club at a young age and played in all grades at juvenile and underage levels as a dual player of hurling and Gaelic football.

=== Tipperary ===
==== Minor and under-21 ====
Byrne first lined out for Tipperary as a member of the minor team during the 2015 Munster Championship. On 12 July, he was an unused substitute when Tipperary defeated Limerick by 0–20 to 0–17 in the Munster Championship final. Byrne was again an unused substitute on 6 September when Tipperary suffered a 4–13 to 1–16 defeat by Galway in the All-Ireland final.

Byrne made his first appearance for the Tipperary under-21 team on 22 June 2017. He lined out at right wing-back in Tipperary's 2–24 to 0–19 defeat by Limerick in the Munster Championship.

On 26 August 2018, Byrne was at centre-back when Tipperary faced Cork in the All-Ireland final. He ended the game as man of the match following a 3–13 to 1–16 victory for Tipperary. Morris ended the year by being named in the centre-back position on the Team of the Year.

==== Senior ====
Byrne made his first appearance for the Tipperary senior team on 26 January 2019. He scored a point from midfield in Tipperary's 2–16 to 1-11 National League defeat of Clare. He made his Munster Championship debut on 19 May 2019 when he came on as a second-half substitute in the 2–30 to 0–18 defeat of Waterford. On 30 June 2019, Byrne was an unused substitute when Tipperary suffered a 2–26 to 2–14 defeat by Limerick in the Munster final. On 18 August 2019, he was again amongst the substitutes when Tipperary faced Kilkenny in the All-Ireland final. Byrne remained on the bench throughout but ended the game with an All-Ireland medal following the 3–25 to 0–20 victory.

== Career statistics ==
As of match played 18 August 2019.

Team	Year	National League			Munster		All-Ireland		Total	
Team	Year	Division	Apps	Score	Apps	Score	Apps	Score	Apps	Score
Tipperary	2019	Division 1A	5	0-04	4	0-00	0	0-00	9	0-04
Career total			5	0-04	4	0-00	0	0-00	9	0-04

== Honours ==
Portroe

- North Tipperary Junior A Football Championship (3): 2016, 2017, 2018

Tipperary

- All-Ireland Senior Hurling Championship (1): 2019
- All-Ireland Under-21 Hurling Championship (1): 2018
- Munster Minor Hurling Championship (1): 2015
