= Killian O'Dwyer =

Irish hurler

Personal information
- Born: County Tipperary, Ireland

Sport
- Sport: Hurling
- Position: Half-back
Club
- Years: Club
- Killenaule
Inter-county
Years	County	Apps (scores)
2019 -	Tipperary	0 (0-0)

Killian O'Dwyer is an Irish hurler who plays as a defender for the Tipperary senior team. He plays his club hurling with Killenaule.

== Career ==
O'Dwyer made his senior debut for the Tipperary hurling team on 26 January 2019 in the first round of the 2019 National Hurling League against Clare when he came on as a late substitute.

== Honours ==
Tipperary

- All-Ireland Under-21 Hurling Championship (1): 2018
- All-Ireland Minor Hurling Championship (1): 2016
- Munster Minor Hurling Championship (1): 2016
