= Kevin O'Halloran (Gaelic footballer) =

Irish Gaelic footballer

Personal information
- Native name: Caoimhín Ó hAllúráin (Irish)
- Born: 6 January 1994 (age 32)

Sport
- Sport: Gaelic Football
- Position: Right corner forward
Club
- Years: Club
- 2011-: Portroe
Inter-county
Years	County	Apps (scores)
2015-	Tipperary	8 (1-13)

Kevin O'Halloran (born 6 January 1994) is an Irish Gaelic football player who plays at inter-county level for Tipperary, and plays his club football for Portroe.

== Career ==
O'Halloran made his championship debut for Tipperary in 2015 against Kerry. On 31 July 2016, he scored 0-4 as Tipperary defeated Galway in the 2016 All-Ireland Quarter-finals at Croke Park to reach their first All-Ireland semi-final since 1935. On 21 August 2016, Tipperary were beaten in the semi-final by Mayo on a 2-13 to 0-14 scoreline.

== Honours ==
Tipperary

- Munster Under-21 Football Championship (1): 2015
- National Football League Division 3 (1): 2017
