= Paddy Fanning =

Irish sportsperson

Personal information
- Born: Moneygall
- Height: 6 ft 3 in (191 cm)

Sport
- Sport: Hurling
- Position: Half-Forward
Club
- Years: Club
- 2004–: Moneygall
Inter-county
Years	County	Apps (scores)
2010	Tipperary	0 (0)

Paddy Fanning is an Irish sportsperson. He plays hurling with Moneygall and was part of the Tipperary senior inter-county panel in 2010. In May 2010, Fanning was called up to the Senior Tipperary panel for the game against Cork in the Munster Senior Hurling Championship quarter-final in Páirc Uí Chaoimh, but did not make any championship appearances during his time on the panel. He made his league debut on 19 February 2011 against Dublin at Croke Park in a 1-15 to 1-16 defeat.
