= Jamie Moloney =

Irish hurler

Sport
- Sport: Hurling
- Position: Forward
Club
- Years: Club
- Drom-Inch
Club titles
- Tipperary titles: 0
Inter-county*
Years	County	Apps (scores)
2019-	Tipperary	0 (0-00)
Inter-county titles
- Munster titles: 0
- All-Irelands: 1
- NHL: 0
- All Stars: 0
- *Inter County team apps and scores correct as of 18:12, 12 March 2019.

Jamie Moloney is an Irish hurler who plays for Tipperary Senior Championship club Drom-Inch and at inter-county level with the Tipperary senior hurling team. He won an All Ireland with Tipperary as a panellist in 2019.

== Career ==
Moloney made his senior debut for Tipperary on 25 January 2020, coming on as a substitute in the opening round of the 2020 National Hurling League against Limerick in a 0-18 to 2-14 defeat.
