= Paul Maher (Kilsheelan–Kilcash hurler) =

Irish hurler

Sport
- Sport: Hurling
- Position: Corner-Back
Clubs
- Years: Club
- Paul Maher; Kilsheelan–Kilcash
Club titles
- Tipperary titles: 0
College titles
- Fitzgibbon titles: Niall
Inter-county
Years	County	Apps (scores)
2020-	Tipperary	0 (0-00)
Inter-county titles
- Munster titles: 0
- All-Irelands: 0
- NHL: 0
- All Stars: 0

Paul Maher is a tipperary hurler and footballer from Kilsheelan.

== Career ==
Maher made his senior debut for Tipperary on 8 March 2020, starting at right corner back in the fifth round of the 2020 National Hurling League against Galway in a 3–13 to 3–21 defeat.
