= Brian Hogan (Tipperary hurler) =

Irish hurler (born 1996)

Personal information
- Native name: Brian Ó hÓgáin (Irish)
- Born: 9 July 1996 (age 30) Lorrha, County Tipperary, Ireland
- Height: 6 ft 2 in (188 cm)

Sport
- Sport: hurling
- Position: Goalkeeper
Club
- Years: Club
- Lorrha
Club titles
- Tipperary titles: 0
College(s)
- Years: College
- Maynooth University; University College Dublin
College titles
- Fitzgibbon titles: 0
Inter-county*
Years	County	Apps (scores)
2016-present	Tipperary	12 (0-00)
Inter-county titles
- Munster titles: 1
- All-Irelands: 2
- NHL: 0
- All Stars: 1
- *Inter County team apps and scores correct as of 19:52, 26 August 2019.

Brian Hogan (born 9 July 1996) is an Irish hurler who plays for North Tipperary club Lorrha and at inter-county level with the Tipperary senior hurling team. He usually lines out as a goalkeeper.

== Playing career ==
=== Maynooth University ===
As a student at the Maynooth University, Hogan joined the senior hurling team during his second year. On 24 February 2018, he was selected at centre-back when Maynooth University faced Ulster University in the final of the Ryan Cup. Hogan scored 0-02 from frees and collected a winners' medal as captain following the 2–19 to 0–09 victory.

=== University College Dublin ===
After transferring to University College Dublin in 2018, Hogan immediately joined the senior hurling team. He lined out in goal for the university in their unsuccessful 2019 Fitzgibbon Cup campaign.

=== Lorrha ===
Hogan joined the Lorrha–Dorrha club at a young age and played in all grades at juvenile and underage levels. On 11 November 2017, he was a North Tipperary U21 B Championship medal following a 1–04 to 0–06 defeat of Silvermines in the final.

=== Tipperary ===
==== Minor and under-21 ====
Hogan first lined out for Tipperary as a member of the minor team during the 2013 Munster Championship. He made his first appearance for the team on 11 April 2013 when he lined out in goal in a 2–18 to 1–15 defeat of Waterford.

Hogan was again eligible for the minor grade in 2014 and retained his position as first-choice goalkeeper. He made his final appearance for the minor team on 30 April 2014 in a 1–23 to 0–12 defeat by Clare.

Hogan was still in his final year with the minor team when he was drafted onto the Tipperary under-21 panel. On 16 July 2014, he was sub-goalkeeper to Paul Maher when Tipperary suffered a 5–19 to 1–25 defeat by Clare in the Munster Championship.

After spending a second successive season as sub-goalkeeper to Maher in 2015, Hogan took over as first-choice goalkeeper for the 2016 Munster Championship. He made his first appearance for the team on 14 July 2016 in a 2–12 to 1–13 defeat of Limerick. On 27 July 2016, Hogan lined out in goal when Tipperary suffered a 2–19 to 0–15 defeat by Waterford in the Munster final.

Hogan lined out in a fourth successive Munster Championship campaign with Tipperary in 2017. He played his last game in the grade on 22 June 2017 when Tipperary were defeated by Limerick by 2–24 to 0–19.

==== Intermediate ====
Hogan joined the Tipperary intermediate team prior to the start of the 2016 Munster Championship. He made his first appearance for the team on 22 May 2016 in a 3–20 to 1–15 defeat of Cork. Hogan was again in goal when Tipperary exited the championship on 19 June following a two-point defeat by Limerick.

==== Senior ====
Hogan was one of two goalkeepers called into the 40-strong training panel by Tipperary senior team manager Michael Ryan at the start of the 2016 season. On 10 July, he was a member of the extended training panel when Tipperary defeated Waterford by 5–19 to 0–13 to win the Munster Championship. Hogan was again a member of the extended panel when Tipperary defeated Kilkenny by 2–29 to 2–20 in the All-Ireland final on 4 September 2016.

Hogan was Tipperary's third-choice goalkeeper behind Darren Gleeson and Darragh Mooney as a member of the extended panel for the 2017 season. He made no appearances for the team in either the National League or the Championship.

On 11 March 2018, Hogan made his first appearance for the Tipperary senior team when he lined out in goal in a 1–24 to 1–21 defeat of Cork National League. On 3 April 2018, Tipperary manager Michael Ryan announced that Darragh Mooney would be his first-choice goalkeeper "barring injury or a complete loss of form". In spite of this, Hogan was still selected in goal for Tipperary's opening game in the Munster Championship - a 1–12 to 2–14 defeat by Limerick. He lined out in goal in all three of Tipperary's subsequent Munster Championship games.

On 30 June 2019, Hogan lined out in goal in his first Munster final when Tipperary faced Limerick. He ended the game on the losing side after a 2–26 to 2–14 defeat. On 18 August 2019, Hogan was again in goal when Tipperary qualified for the All-Ireland final against Kilkenny. He kept a clean sheet throughout and ended the game with a second winners' medal - his first on the field of play - after a 3–25 to 0–20 victory. Hogan ended the season by being named in the goalkeeping position on the GAA/GPA All-Star Team.

== Career statistics ==
As of match played 18 August 2019.

Team	Year	National League			Munster		All-Ireland		Total	
Team	Year	Division	Apps	Score	Apps	Score	Apps	Score	Apps	Score
Tipperary	2016	Division 1A	0	0-00	0	0-00	0	0-00	0	0-00
Tipperary	2017	Division 1A	0	0-00	0	0-00	0	0-00	0	0-00
Tipperary	2018	Division 1A	2	0-00	4	0-00	—		6	0-00
Tipperary	2019	Division 1A	2	0-00	5	0-00	3	0-00	10	0-00
Total			4	0-00	9	0-00	3	0-00	16	0-00

== Honours ==
Maynooth University

- Ryan Cup (1): 2018 (c)

Lorrha

- North Tipperary Under-21 B Hurling Championship (1): 2017
- North Tipperary Intermediate Hurling Championship: 2022
- Tipperary Intermediate Hurling Championship : 2022

Tipperary

- All-Ireland Senior Hurling Championship (2): 2016, 2019
- Munster Senior Hurling Championship (1): 2016

Awards

- All-Stars (1): 2019
