= Portroe =

Village in County Tipperary, Ireland

Portroe Irish: An Port Rua
- Village
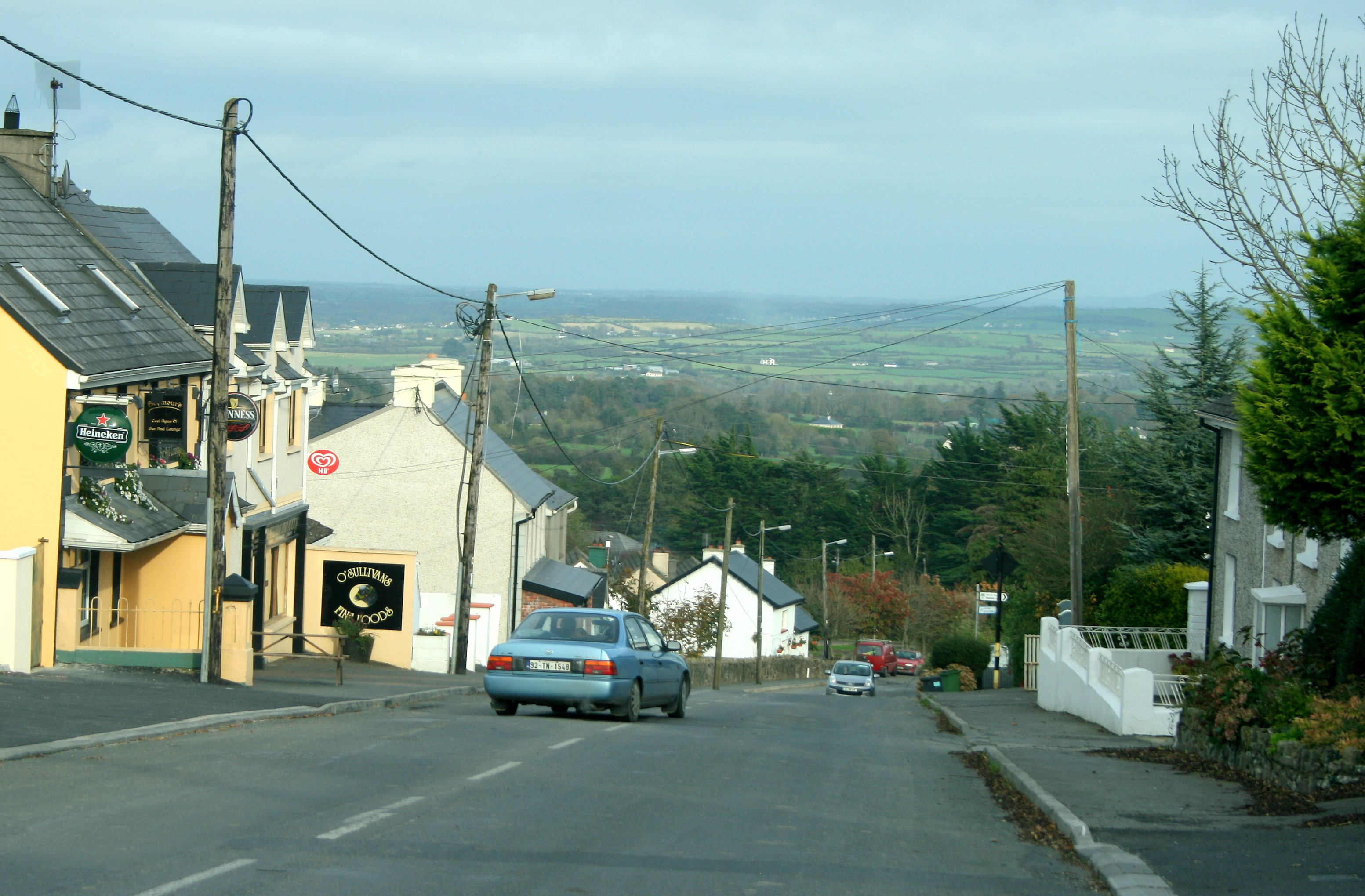
- View northeast from Portroe

- Location in Ireland
- Coordinates: 52°53′N 8°21′W
- Country: Ireland
- Province: Munster
- County: County Tipperary
- Barony: Owney and Arra
- Civil parish: Castletownarra

Population (2022)
  - Total: 459
- Eircode routing key(s): E45, V94
- Area code: (+353) 067

Portroe (Irish: An Port Rua, meaning 'the red port') is a village in County Tipperary, Ireland. The village is located on the R494 regional road, 2km from the eastern shore of Lough Derg and 11km west of the town of Nenagh. Portroe spans the townlands of Garrykennedy, Glencrue and Shesharoe. As of the 2022 census, it had a population of 459.

== History ==
Evidence of ancient settlement in the area includes a number of standing stone, rock art, ring fort and tower house sites in the townlands of Garrykennedy, Lisheenbrien and Lisheentyrone.

The local Roman Catholic church, which is dedicated to St. Mary, was built in 1872. A former Royal Irish Constabulary (RIC) barracks, at the top of the hill in Portroe, was built c.1830.

On Loughtea Hill, one of the Arra hills southwest of Portroe, a 20 metre high stainless steel cross was erected in 2002. It was raised to mark the millennium and to replace an earlier cross placed there following the 1932 Eucharistic Congress in Dublin.

== Transport ==
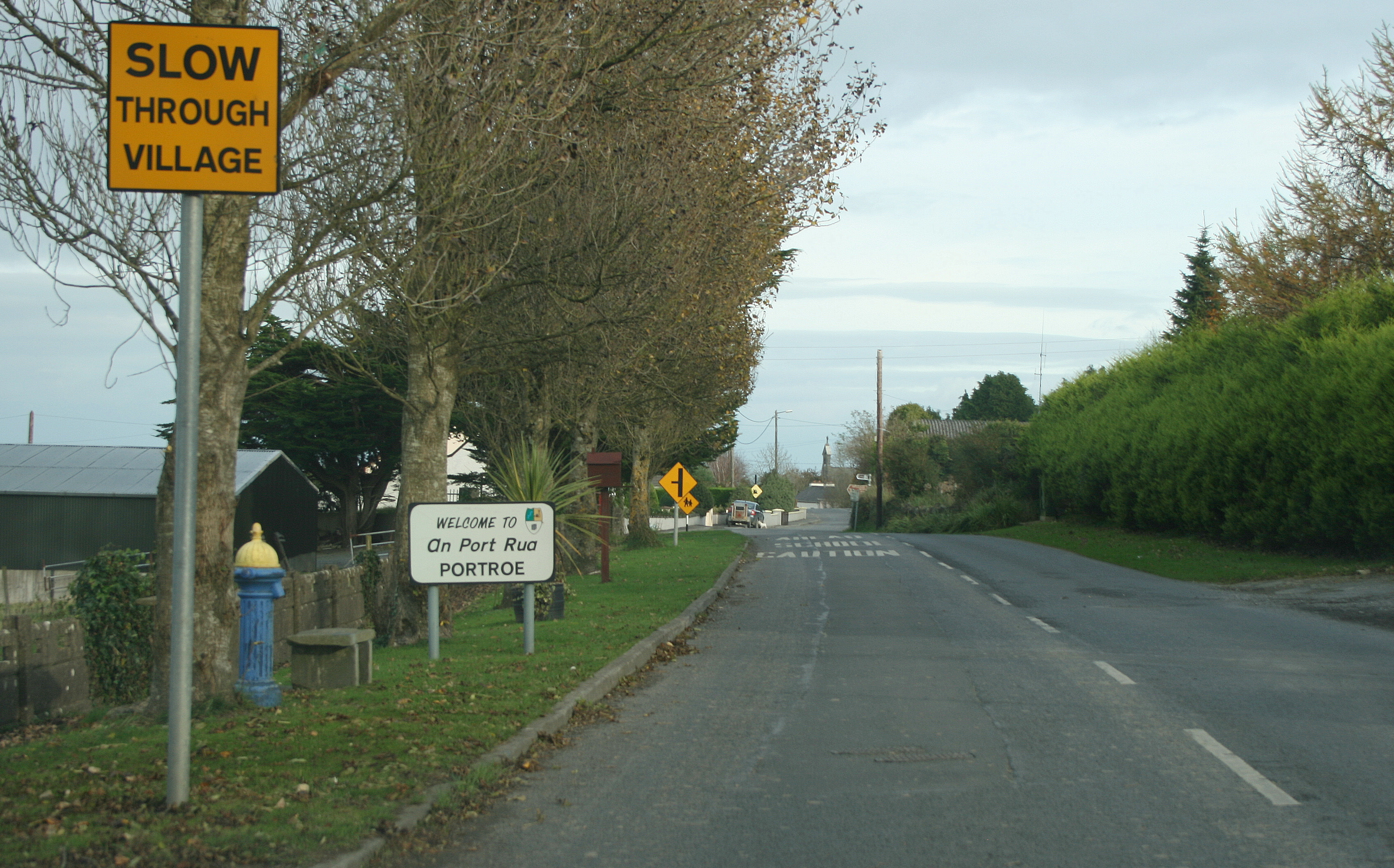
Entering Portroe on the R494 regional road

Bus Éireann route 323 serves the village. It travels to and from Limerick and Nenagh. The bus stop is situated either side of 'Portroe cross' at the bottom of the village.

== Community ==
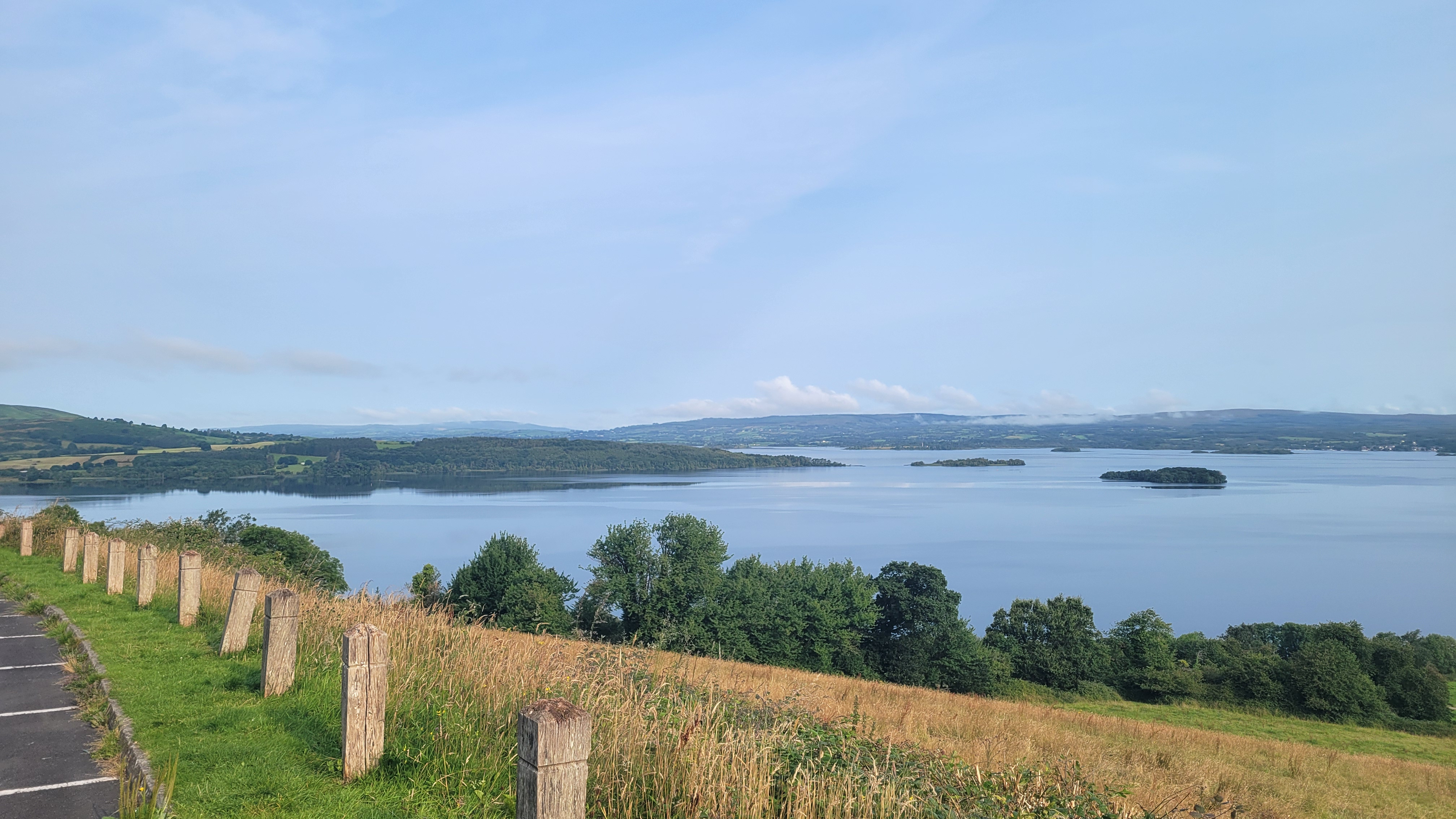
A viewing point, overlooking Lough Derg to the west of Portroe, on the R494

Organisations based in the Portroe area include Portroe GAA club, an apostolic society, a church choir, a Tidy Towns committee, a youth club, and the Arra Historical & Archaeological Society Representatives of the village also participate in events like Scór, the cultural branch of the GAA. An annual 'vintage day' is held locally to raise money for charity.

The local community hall is used for events, classes and by local clubs. A pre-school lies adjacent to the hall. There is also an old handball alley next to the former primary school in Portroe. The current national (primary) school, Scoil Mhuire, had an enrollment of 128 pupils in 2025.

There is a diving club situated on the outskirts of Portroe in an area called Killoran. The club use an old flooded quarry reaching depths of 39m.

== Sport ==
Portroe GAA is the local Gaelic Athletic Association club. A senior hurling team, representing Portroe, won their first-ever North Tipperary Senior Hurling title in 2012 in McDonagh Park in Nenagh. Liam Sheedy, who played his club hurling with Portroe and inter-county hurling with Tipperary, was twice the manager of the Tipperary hurling team. Portroe also fields camogie teams.

== Demographics ==
As of the 2016 census, Portroe had a population of 461, up from 411 people as of the 1996 census. By the 2022 census, the population was 459.

== Notable people ==
- Alan Kelly, politician
- Declan Kelly, businessperson
- Niamh Kennedy, model
- Sean Kenny, theatre designer
- Gerry O'Connor, musician
- Liam Sheedy, former hurler and manager

== See also ==
- List of towns and villages in Ireland
