= Paul Maher (Moyne–Templetuohy hurler) =

Irish hurler

Personal information
- Native name: Pól Ó Meachair (Irish)
- Born: 8 November 1994 (age 31) Templetuohy, County Tipperary, Ireland
- Occupation: Hurley Maker

Sport
- Sport: Hurling
- Position: Goalkeeper
Club
- Years: Club
- Moyne–Templetuohy
Club titles
- Tipperary titles: 0
College
- Years: College
- University of Limerick
College titles
- Fitzgibbon titles: 1
Inter-county*
Years	County	Apps (scores)
2018-present	Tipperary	0 (0-00)
Inter-county titles
- Munster titles: 0
- All-Irelands: 1
- NHL: 0
- All Stars: 0
- *Inter County team apps and scores correct as of 17:14, 12 March 2019.

Paul Maher (born 8 November 1994) is an Irish hurler who plays for Tipperary Intermediate Championship club Moyne–Templetuohy and at inter-county level with the Tipperary senior hurling team. He usually lines out as a goalkeeper.

== Playing career ==
=== University of Limerick ===
On 11 March 2015, Maher lined out in goal for the University of Limerick when they faced Waterford Institute of Technology in the Fitzgibbon Cup final replay. UL secured a 2–18 to 1–14 victory.

=== Moyne-Templetuohy ===
Maher joined the Moyne–Templetuohy club at a young age and played in all grades at juvenile and underage levels.

On 2 November 2014, Maher lined out in goal when Moyne–Templetuohy faced Thurles Sarsfields in the final of the Tipperary Intermediate Championship. Moyne–Templetuohy won by 1–18 to 0–10.

=== Tipperary ===
==== Minor and under-21 ====
Maher made his first appearance for the Tipperary minor team on 2 May 2012. He lined out in goal in the 6–21 to 0–11 defeat of Kerry in the Munster Championship. On 15 July, he won a Munster Championship medal following Tipperary's 1–16 to 1–12 defeat of Clare in the final. On 4 September, Morris was at centre-forward when Tipperary faced Limerick in the All-Ireland final. He was Tipperary's top scorer once again in the 1–21 to 0–17 victory. On 9 September, Maher was again in goal for Tipperary's 2–13 to 1–16 draw with Dublin in the All-Ireland final. The replay on 30 September saw Maher win an All-Ireland medal after a 21–8 to 1–11 victory.

Maher joined the Tipperary under-21 team as substitute goalkeeper for the 2013 Munster Championship. On 7 August, he was an unused substitute when Tipperary suffered a 1–17 to 2–10 defeat by Clare in the Munster Championship final.

On 16 July 2014, Maher made his first appearance for the Tipperary under-21 team. He lined out in goal in Tipperary's 5–19 to 1–25 defeat by Clare in the Munster Championship semi-final.

Maher ended his tenure with the under-21 team with a 3–16 to 3–14 defeat by Limerick in the Munster Championship.

==== Senior ====
Maher made his first appearance for the Tipperary senior team on 28 January 2018. He lined out in goal in Tipperary's 1–21 to 0-19 National League defeat by Clare.

On 30 June 2019, Maher was an unused substitute when Tipperary suffered a 2–26 to 2–14 defeat by Limerick in the Munster final. On 18 August 2019, he was again named amongst the substitutes when Tipperary faced Kilkenny in the All-Ireland final. Maher ended the game with an All-Ireland winners' medal following the 3–25 to 0–20 victory.

== Career statistics ==
As of match played 18 August 2019.

Team	Year	National League			Munster		All-Ireland		Total	
Team	Year	Division	Apps	Score	Apps	Score	Apps	Score	Apps	Score
Tipperary	2018	Division 1A	2	0-00	0	0-00	—		2	0-00
Tipperary	2019	Division 1A	3	0-00	0	0-00	0	0-00	3	0-00
Career total			5	0-00	0	0-00	0	0-00	5	0-00

== Honours ==
Fitzgibbon Cup

- Fitzgibbon Cup (1): 2015

Moyne–Templetuohy

- Tipperary Intermediate Hurling Championship (1): 2014

Tipperary

- All-Ireland Senior Hurling Championship (1): 2019
- All-Ireland Minor Hurling Championship (1): 2012
- Munster Minor Hurling Championship (1): 2012
