= Portroe GAA =

Gaelic games club in County Tipperary, Ireland

Portroe
- An Port Rua
- Founded: 1884
- County: Tipperary
- Nickname: Port/The Quarrymen
- Colours: Green and Gold
- Grounds: Portroe
- Coordinates: 52°53′10″N 8°20′50″W

Playing kits
Standard colours

Portroe GAA is a Tipperary GAA club which is located in County Tipperary, Ireland. Both hurling and Gaelic football are played in the North-Tipperary divisional competitions. The club is centred on the village of Portroe which is eight miles outside Nenagh.

== History ==
Portroe is in the centre of a traditional slate quarrying district of Northwest Tipperary. A number of people from the area emigrated to the "slate belt" of Vermont in the 19th century.

Portroe GAA club was formed in the 1880s. The club has won several Northern Tipperary divisional titles, and won the Tipperary Intermediate Hurling Championship in 1990.

== Honours ==
- Tipperary Intermediate Hurling Championship (1) 1990
- Tipperary Junior B Hurling Championship (1) 1998
- Tipperary Minor C Hurling Championship (1) 2009
- North Tipperary Senior Hurling Championship (1) 2012
- North Tipperary Premier Intermediate Hurling Championship (1) 2022
- North Tipperary Intermediate Hurling Championship (4) 1950, 1981, 1983, 1990
- North Tipperary Intermediate Hurling League (1) 1988
- North Tipperary Junior A Hurling Championship (4) 1915, 1916, 1968, 1973
- North Tipperary Junior B Hurling Championship (6) 1990, 1998, 2007, 2014, 2016, 2022
- North Tipperary Junior B Hurling League (2) 2012, 2018
- North Tipperary Junior A Football Championship (9) 1937, 1979, 1995, 1997, 1999, 2006, 2016, 2017, 2018
- North Tipperary Under-21 B Hurling Championship (5) 1980, 1982, 1989, 2011, 2021
- North Tipperary Under-21 C Hurling Championship (2) 2000, 2004
- North Tipperary Under-21 B Football Championship (5) 1989, 2006, 2011, 2015, 2017
- North Tipperary Minor B Hurling Championship (2) 2005, 2012
- North Tipperary Minor C Hurling Championship (1) 2003
- North Tipperary Minor B Football Championship (1) 1990

== Notable players ==
- Kevin O'Halloran, inter-county footballer for Tipperary
- John Sheedy, former goalkeeper with the Tipperary senior team
- Liam Sheedy, former Tipperary manager who managed the senior team that won the 2010 All Ireland title
- Darren Gleeson, All-Star goalkeeper 2014
- Robert Byrne, member of Tipperary All-Ireland championship winning team
