= 2023 Tipperary Senior Football Championship =

County Gaelic Games competition

- Dates: 3 August 2023 - 22 October 2023
- Teams: 16
- Sponsor: FBD Insurance
- Champions: Clonmel Commercials (21st title); Séamus Kennedy (captain); Tommy Morrissey (manager)
- Runners-up: JK Brackens; Paddy Cadell (captain); Kevin Mulryan (manager)
- Relegated: Rockwell Rovers; Éire Óg Annacarty; Moycarkey–Borris

Tournament statistics
- Matches played: 31
- Goals scored: 83 (2.68 per match)
- Points scored: 614 (19.81 per match)
- Top scorer(s): Jack Kennedy (4-32)

The 2023 Tipperary Senior Football Championship was the 132nd staging of the Tipperary Senior Football Championship since its establishment by the Tipperary County Board in 1887.

Clonmel Commercials were the defending champions and went on to retain the title.

== Team changes ==
=== To Championship ===
Promoted from the Tipperary Intermediate Football Championship

- Ballina

=== From Championship ===
Relegated to the Tipperary Intermediate Football Championship

- Aherlow

== Group stage ==
The draw for the group stage took place on 3 April 2023.

Advance to quarter-finals Advance to relegation semi-final

=== Group 1 ===
Team	Matches				Score			Pts
Team	Pld	W	D	L	For	Against	Diff	Pts
Clonmel Commercials	3	3	0	0	9-44	3-12	+50	6
Kilsheelan–Kilcash	3	1	0	2	5-28	5-23	+3	2
Drom & Inch	3	1	0	2	1-21	4-36	-24	2
Éire Óg Annacarty	3	1	0	2	1-16	4-36	-29	2

==== Results ====
3 August 2023 Round 1	Drom & Inch	0-6 - 0-7	Éire Óg Annacarty	Dundrum
19.30	Robbie Long, David Butler, Emmet Moloney, Paul Mullen, David Collins (1f) and Tommy Nolan 0-1 each	Report	Dinny Crosse (1f) 0-4, Darragh Mooney (1 45'), Brian Fox and Eoin Bradshaw 0-1 each	Referee: Paddy Russell

5 August 2023 Round 1	Kilsheelan-Kilcash	3-6 - 3-7	Clonmel Commercials	Ardfinnan
15.00	Jamie Roche 1-5, Micheal Freaney 2-0, Billy O'Connor 0-1	Report	Cian Smith 1-1, Séamus Kennedy and Sean Kennedy 1-0 each, Jack Kennedy 0-3, Michael Quinlivan 0-2, Conal Kennedy 0-1	Referee: Derek O'Mahoney

19 August 2023 Round 2	Clonmel Commercials	3-18 - 0-2	Éire Óg Annacarty	Cashel
17.15	Jack Kennedy (5f) 0-7, Michael Quinlivan (0-1m), Sean Kennedy and Colman Kennedy 1-1 each, Conal Kennedy 0-2, Ciaran Cannon, Tadhg Condon, Séamus Kennedy, Cathal Deely, Kevin Fahey and Cian Smith 0-1 each	Report	Darragh Mooney (1f) and Dinny Crosse (1f) 0-1 each	Referee: Sean Everard

19 August 2023 Round 2	Drom & Inch	1-11 - 1-10	Kilsheelan-Kilcash	Cashel
19.00	Stevie Nolan 1-0, David Butler (1f) and Jamie Moloney 0-3 each, Fintan Purcell, Jamie Bergin, Robbie Long, David Collins and Mikey Connors 0-1 each	Report	Jamie Roche (5f) 0-8, Daire Brennan 1-0, Emmet Butler and Tommy O'Connor 0-1 each	Referee: Seanie Peters

3 September 2023 Round 3	Drom & Inch	0-4 - 3-19	Clonmel Commercials	Golden
15.45	David Butler (2f) 0-2, Jamie Moloney and David Collins 0-1 each	Report	Sean O'Connor (0-1f) 1-4, Colman Kennedy and Peter McGarry 1-1, Jack Kennedy (3f) 0-4, Cian Smith 0-3, Kevin Fahey, Aldo Matassa, Séamus Kennedy, Padraic Looram, Conal Kennedy and Ross Peters 0-1 each	Referee: Donie Horan

3 September 2023 Round 3	Éire Óg Annacarty	1-7 - 1-12	Kilsheelan-Kilcash	New Inn
15.45	Kev Fox 1-0, Dinny Crosse (2f) 0-3, Paul Devlin, Brian Fox, Tom Fox and Paul Downey 0-1 each	Report	Jamie Roche (3f) 0-6, Barry Kehoe 1-1, Mark Kehoe 0-4, Harry Roche-Nagle 0-1	Referee: Seanie Peters

=== Group 2 ===
Team	Matches				Score			Pts
Team	Pld	W	D	L	For	Against	Diff	Pts
Loughmore–Castleiney	3	2	0	1	1-31	4-16	+6	4
Ballina	3	2	0	1	9-31	5-29	+14	4
Ardfinnan	3	1	0	2	5-35	7-27	+2	2
Moycarkey–Borris	3	1	0	2	3-13	2-38	-22	2

==== Results ====
4 August 2023 Round 1	Ardfinnan	3-13 - 6-11	Ballina	Templemore
19.30	Michael Barlow 2-5, Billy Hewitt 1-1, Gavin Whelan 0-4, Oisin Ryan, Gerry Cronin and Michael Hogan 0-1 each	Report	David Kelly 3-1, Bernard King 1-2, Tom Lee 1-1, Michael Breen 1-0, Teddy Doyle, Charlie King and Eoghan Power 0-2 each, Cathal O'Donnell 0-1	Referee: Seamus Delaney

4 August 2023 Round 1	Loughmore-Castleiney	0-7 - 1-5	Moycarkey-Borris	Gortnahoe
19.30	Liam McGrath (3f) 0-4, John Ryan, Eamonn Connolly and Ed Connolly 0-1 each	Report	Rhys Shelly 1-0, Kyle Shelly (1f) 0-3, Jack Fallon and James Dillon 0-1 each	Referee: Joe Leahy

19 August 2023 Round 2	Ballina	0-15 - 1-3	Moycarkey-Borris	Borrisoleigh
18.30	Eoghan Power (2f) 0-5, Bernard King 0-3, Michael Breen and Charlie King 0-2 each, David Kelly, Dara King and Cathal O'Donnell 0-1 each		Rhys Shelly (0-2f) 1-2, Kyle Shelly 0-1	Referee: Donie Horan

19 August 2023 Round 2	Ardfinnan	0-6 - 0-11	Loughmore-Castleiney	Boherlahan
18.30	Michael Barlow 0-2, Sean Nagle, Oisin Ryan, Gavin Whelan and Billy Hewitt (1f) 0-1 each	Report	Liam McGrath (2f) 0-5, Conor Ryan 0-2, Eoin O'Connell, Brian McGrath, Philip O'Connell and Cian Hennessy 0-1 each	Referee: Paddy Russell

2 September 2023 Round 3	Ballina	3-5 - 1-13	Loughmore-Castleiney	Moneygall
14.00	Eoghan Power and Bernard King 1-1 each, David Kelly 1-0, Teddy Doyle (1 45'), Dara King and Cathal O'Donnell 0-1 each	Report	Liam McGrath (3f) 0-10, Brian McGrath 1-0, Tomas McGrath, Noel McGrath and Conor Ryan 0-1 each	Referee: Sean Lonergan

2 September 2023 Round 3	Ardfinnan	2-16 - 1-5	Moycarkey-Borris	Fethard
14.00	Gavin Whelan 2-4, Michael Barlow (4f) 0-6, Aaron Lonergan 0-2, Colm O'Shaughnessy, Oisin Ryan, Andrew Browne and Darragh O'Brien 0-1 each	Report	Rhys Shelly 1-1, Kyle Shelly (1f) 0-2, Conor Hayes and Kieran Morris 0-1 each	Referee: David Grogan

=== Group 3 ===
Team	Matches				Score			Pts
Team	Pld	W	D	L	For	Against	Diff	Pts
Upperchurch-Drombane	3	3	0	0	4-29	4-20	+9	6
Killenaule	3	2	0	1	3-32	3-17	+15	4
Cahir	3	1	0	2	5-22	3-36	-8	2
Arravale Rovers	3	0	0	3	3-27	5-37	-16	0

==== Results ====
5 August 2023 Round 1	Killenaule	2-13 - 0-6	Arravale Rovers	Boherlahan
17.30	Eoin Shaw 1-2, Paudie Feehan 0-5, Joe O'Dwyer (0-1f) 1-1, Michael Doyle (2f) 0-3, Eoin O'Connell 0-2	Report	Caleb Hickey (3f) 0-4, Michael Lowry and Donagh Leahy 0-1 each	Referee: Keith Delahunty

5 August 2023 Round 1	Upperchurch-Drombane	1-11 - 2-5	Cahir	Golden
19.00	Luke Shanahan (0-1f) 1-3, Paul Shanahan (3f) 0-3, Keith Ryan and Padraig Greene 0-2 each, Niall Grant 0-1	Report	Ger Quinn (0-1f) 2-1, Liam Casey (1f) and Jack Buckley 0-2 each	Referee: Seanie Peters

18 August 2023 Round 2	Killenaule	0-4 - 1-6	Upperchurch-Drombane	The Ragg
19.00	Michael Doyle (1f) 0-2, Joe O'Dwyer and Eoin O'Connell 0-1 each	Report	Keith Ryan 1-0, Paul Shanahan (1f) 0-3, Aaron Ryan, Niall Grant and Luke Shanahan (1f) 0-1 each	Referee: Derek O Mahoney

20 August 2023 Round 2	Arravale Rovers	1-10 - 1-12	Cahir	Golden
14.00	Cormac Maher (0-1f) 1-2, Mikey O'Dwyer (2f) 0-5, Donagh Leahy 0-2, Johnny Lowry 0-1	Report	Conor O'Brien (2f) 0-4, Jake Kiely 1-0, Jack Buckley (3f) 0-3, Kevin Grogan and Liam Casey 0-2 each, Michael O'Connor 0-1	Referee: Joe Leahy

2 September 2023 Round 3	Arravale Rovers	2-11 - 2-12	Upperchurch-Drombane	Dundrum
15.45	Mikey O'Dwyer (0-2f) 1-5, Niall Sharpe 1-0, Cormac Maher (2f), Cian Ryan and Donagh Leahy 0-2 each	Report	Luke Shanahan (0-2f) 1-4, Paul Shanahan (0-2f) 1-3, Aaron Ryan, Niall Grant, Conor Fahy, Loughlin Ryan and Paddy Phelan 0-1 each	Referee: Seamus Delaney

2 September 2023 Round 3	Cahir	2-5 - 1-15	Killenaule	Fethard
15.45	Sean O'Connor 1-2, Jesse Kiely 1-1, Jake Kiely and Jack Buckley (1f) 0-1 each	Report	Joe O'Dwyer (1f) 0-6, Michael Doyle (2f) 0-4, Oisin Shelly 1-0, Paudie Feehan 0-2, Tom Stakelum, Eoin Shaw and Luke Ryan 0-1 each	Referee: Sean Everard

=== Group 4 ===
Team	Matches				Score			Pts
Team	Pld	W	D	L	For	Against	Diff	Pts
JK Brackens	3	3	0	0	7-35	3-30	+17	6
Moyle Rovers	3	1	0	2	2-41	4-33	+2	2
Ballyporeen	3	1	0	2	2-38	3-40	-5	2
Rockwell Rovers	3	1	0	2	3-27	4-38	-14	2

==== Results ====
4 August 2023 Round 1	Rockwell Rovers	0-9 - 1-13	Ballyporeen	Clonmel
19.30	Alan Moloney (3f) 0-4, TJ Ryan (1f) 0-3, Liam Fahey and Pat Halley 0-1 each	Report	Darragh Brennan (1-0p, 0-7f) 1-9, Glen Walsh and John Martin 0-2 each	Referee: Sean Lonergan

5 August 2023 Round 1	JK Brackens	3-8 - 0-12	Moyle Rovers	Boherlahan
19.00	Cathal Scully 2-1, Shane Doyle 1-1, Dean McEnroe and Jack Kennedy (1f) 0-2 each, Neil Quinlan and Jack Nevin 0-1 each	Report	Liam Boland (3f) 0-4, Stephen Quirke (2f) and Jack Harney 0-2 each, Cian Crowe, Luke Boland, Dara Ryan and Shane Foley 0-1 each	Referee: Sean Horan

18 August 2023 Round 2	Moyle Rovers	0-12 - 1-11	Rockwell Rovers	Cahir
19.00	Liam Boland (4f) 0-7, Stephen Quirke (1f) 0-3, Luke Boland and Shane Foley 0-1 each	Report	Eoghan Doyle (3f, 2 45') 0-5, Aidan Barron 1-0, TJ Ryan (1f) 0-2, Tom Downey, Kevin Cleary, Eoin Byrne (1f) and Alan Moloney (1f) 0-1 each	Referee: Seamus Delaney

20 August 2023 Round 2	Ballyporeen	1-11 - 1-14	JK Brackens	Golden
15.30	Darragh Brennan (1-0p, 0-8f) 1-8, Darragh Lyons 0-2, Anthony Crotty 0-1	Report	Jack Kennedy (6f) 0-8, Luke Ormond 1-0, Dean McEnroe and Jack Nevin 0-2 each, Neil Quinlan and Paddy Cadell 0-1 each	Referee: David Grogan

3 September 2023 Round 3	JK Brackens	3-13 - 2-7	Rockwell Rovers	Holycross
13.30	Jack Kennedy 2-5, Paddy Cadell 1-2, Dean McEnroe 0-2, Neil Quinlan, Adrian Bourke, Conor Cadell and Shane Doyle 0-1 each	Report	Alan Moloney 1-3, Aidan Barron 1-0, TJ Ryan 0-2, Eoin Byrne and Eoin Shine 0-1 each	Referee: Joe Leahy

3 September 2023 Round 3	Ballyporeen	0-14 - 2-17	Moyle Rovers	Clonmel
13.30	Darragh Brennan (7f) 0-10, Tomas Vaughan, Christy English, Anthony Crotty and John Martin 0-1 each	Report	Liam Boland (1-0p, 0-2f) 1-5, Stephen Quirke 1-2, Riain Quigley 0-5, Diarmuid Foley 0-2, Rory Collins, Shane Foley and Dean English 0-1 each	Referee: Derek O Mahoney

== Relegation ==
23 September 2023 Semi-Final	Éire Óg Annacarty	1-9 - 1-14	Arravale Rovers	Cappawhite
13.00	Dinny Crosse (3f) 0-5, Tom Fox 1-0, Darragh Kelly 0-2, Brian Fox and Paul Downey 0-1 each	Report	Micheal Lowry 1-2, Mikey O'Dwyer (5f) 0-5, Cormac Maher (2f) and James Hogan (1f) 0-2 each, Donagh Leahy, Caleb Hickey and Shane Leahy 0-1 each	Referee: Tom McGlinchey

23 September 2023 Semi-Final	Rockwell Rovers	3-11 - 1-3	Moycarkey-Borris	Fethard
14.30	TJ Ryan (0-1f) 1-3, Alan Moloney (3f) 0-4, Liam Fahey and Tom Tobin 1-0 each, Joe Lawrence and Eoin Byrne 0-2 each	Report	Rhys Shelly 1-0, Kieran Cummins, Jack Fallon and Tom Ryan 0-1 each	Referee: Paul Guinan

7 October 2023 Final	Rockwell Rovers	0-10 - 1-10	Arravale Rovers	Dundrum
12.30	Alan Moloney (1pen, 1f, 1m) 0-5, Eoin Byrne 0-3, Joseph Lawrence and TJ Ryan 0-1 each	Report	Mikey O'Dwyer 1-1, Donagh Leahy 0-4, Eoin Doocey 0-2, Cian Ryan, Niall Sharpe and Cormac Maher (1f) 0-1 each	Referee: David Grogan

== Knockout stage ==
=== Bracket ===
Quarter-finals
23 September, Golden
Loughmore–Castleiney	0-12
Moyle Rovers	1-10
23 September, Templemore
Clonmel Commercials	4-17
Ballina	0-7
24 September, Cashel
JK Brackens	2-10
Killenaule	3-3
24 September, Boherlahan
Upperchurch–Drombane	0-10 (7)
Kilsheelan–Kilcash	0-10 (6)

Semi-finals
8 October, Ardfinnan
Moyle Rovers	0-11
Clonmel Commercials	0-14
7 October, The Ragg
JK Brackens	1-14
Upperchurch–Drombane	1-13

Final
22 October, Semple Stadium
Clonmel Commercials	6-7
JK Brackens	2-6

=== Quarter-Finals ===
23 September 2023 Quarter-Final	Loughmore-Castleiney	0-12 - 1-10	Moyle Rovers	Golden
13.30	Liam McGrath (5f) 0-5, Liam Treacy 0-2, Tomas McGrath, John Ryan, Tommy Maher, Brian McGrath and Conor Ryan 0-1 each	Report	Liam Boland (0-2f) 1-5, Riain Quigley 0-2, Jack Harney, Ben Owens and Diarmuid Foley 0-1 each	Referee: Seanie Peters

23 September 2023 Quarter-Final	Clonmel Commercials	4-17 - 0-7	Ballina	Templemore
16.00	Colman Kennedy 2-2, Michael Quinlivan 1-3, Jack Kennedy (5f) 0-6, Sean O'Connor 1-1, Kevin Fahey and Cathal Deely 0-2 each, Tadhg Condon 0-1	Report	Bernard King (3f) 0-3, Teddy Doyle (1f), Charlie King, Eoghan Power and Josh Egan 0-1 each	Referee: Sean Everard

24 September 2023 Quarter-Final	JK Brackens	2-10 - 3-3	Killenaule	Cashel
13.30	Jack Kennedy (1-0p, 0-6f) 1-7, Cathal Scully 1-1, Conor Cadell 0-2	Report	Luke Ryan 1-1, Oisin Shelly and Paudie Feehan (1-0p) 1-0, Paddy Codd and Joe O'Dywer (1f) 0-1 each	Referee: Derek O'Mahoney

24 September 2023 Quarter-Final	Upperchurch-Drombane	0-10 (7) - (6) 0-10 (aet)	Kilsheelan-Kilcash	Boherlahan
16.00	Paul Shanahan (5f) 0-6, Luke Shanahan (2f) 0-3, Gavin Ryan 0-1	Report	Jamie Roche (5f) 0-6, Mark Stokes, Sean Martin, Barry Kehoe and Conor Davin Murphy 0-1 each	Referee: Sean Lonergan

=== Semi-Finals ===
7 October 2023 Semi-Final	JK Brackens	1-14 - 1-13	Upperchurch-Drombane	The Ragg
16.00	Jack Kennedy (4f) 0-7, Cathal Scully 1-0, Jordan Moloney and Lyndon Fairbrother 0-2 each, Neil Quinlan, Eanna McBride and S Scully 0-1 each	Report	Paul Shanahan (4f) 0-5, Luke Shanahan (2f) 0-4, Aaron Ryan 1-0, Jack Butler, Dean Carew, Niall Grant and Conor Fahy 0-1 each	Referee: Derek O'Mahoney

8 October 2023 Semi-Final	Moyle Rovers	0-11 - 0-14	Clonmel Commercials	Ardfinnan
14.00	Liam Boland (6f) 0-7, Jack Harney, Luke Fogarty, Diarmuid Foley and Danny Owens 0-1 each	Report	Jack Kennedy (3f) and Sean O'Connor 0-4 each, Conal Kennedy 0-2, Michael O'Reilly (1f), Peter McGarry, Michael Quinlivan and Sean Kennedy 0-1 each	Referee: Sean Everard

=== Final ===
22 October 2023 Final	Clonmel Commercials	6-7 - 2-6	JK Brackens	Semple Stadium
15.30	Sean O'Connor (0-2f) 2-3, Michael Quinlivan 1-2, Pauric Looram, Peter McGarry and Cathal Deely 1-0 each, Colman Kennedy 0-2	Report	Jack Kennedy (1-0p, 0-2f) 1-3, Adrian Bourke 1-0, Jack Nevin, Eanna McBride and Dean McEnroe 0-1 each	Referee: Derek O'Mahoney

== Championship statistics ==
=== Top scorers ===
==== Overall ====
Rank	Player	Club	Tally	Total	Matches	Average
1	Jack Kennedy	JK Brackens	4-32	44	6	7.33
2	Liam Boland	Moyle Rovers	2-28	34	5	6.8
3	Darragh Brennan	Ballyporeen	2-27	33	3	11
4	Jamie Roche	Kilsheelan-Kilcash	1-25	28	4	7
5	Liam McGrath	Loughmore-Castleiney	0-24	24	4	6
5	Sean O'Connor	Clonmel Commercials	4-12	24	4	6
5	Jack Kennedy	Clonmel Commercials	0-24	24	5	4.8
8	Paul Shanahan	Upperchurch-Drombane	1-20	23	5	4.6
9	Luke Shanahan	Upperchurch-Drombane	2-15	21	5	4.2
10	Michael Barlow	Ardfinnan	2-13	19	3	6.33

==== In a single game ====
Rank	Player	Club	Tally	Total	Opposition
1	Darragh Brennan	Ballyporeen	1-9	12	Rockwell Rovers
2	Darragh Brennan	Ballyporeen	1-8	11	JK Brackens
2	Michael Barlow	Ardfinnan	2-5	11	Ballina
2	Jack Kennedy	JK Brackens	2-5	11	Rockwell Rovers
5	Darragh Brennan	Ballyporeen	0-10	10	Moyle Rovers
5	Liam McGrath	Loughmore-Castleiney	0-10	10	Ballina
5	Jack Kennedy	JK Brackens	1-7	10	Killenaule
5	Gavin Whelan	Ardfinnan	2-4	10	Moycarkey-Borris
5	David Kelly	Ballina	3-1	10	Ardfinnan
10	Sean O'Connor	Clonmel Commercials	2-3	9	JK Brackens
