= Jim Healy =

Jim Healy may refer to:

- Jim Healy (trade unionist) (1898–1961), Australian trade union leader
- Jim Healy (sports commentator) (1923–1994), sports commentator from Los Angeles, California
- Jim Healy (Gaelic footballer) (born 1952), Irish Gaelic footballer

== See also ==
- James Healy (disambiguation)
