= 2026 Tipperary Senior Football Championship =

- Dates: 31 July 2026 - 18 October 2026
- Teams: 12
- Sponsor: FBD Insurance
- Champions: Loughmore–Castleiney (17th title); Brian McGrath (captain); Greg Ramsbottom (manager)
- Runners-up: Clonmel Commercials; Séamus Kennedy (captain); Tommy Morrissey (manager)
- Relegated: Grangemockler–Ballyneale

Tournament statistics
- Matches played: 23
- Goals scored: 43 (1.87 per match)
- Points scored: 601 (26.13 per match)
- Top scorer(s): Sean O'Connor (2-29)

The 2026 Tipperary Senior Football Championship was the 134th staging of the Tipperary Senior Football Championship since its establishment by the Tipperary County Board in 1887.

The defending champions were Clonmel Commercials.

The final was played on 18 October with Loughmore–Castleiney defeating Clonmel Commercials by 0-15 to 0-13 to claim the Philly Ryan Cup.

== Team changes ==
=== To Championship ===
Promoted from the Tipperary Intermediate Football Championship

- Thurles Sarsfields

=== From Championship ===
Relegated to the Tipperary Intermediate Football Championship

- Arravale Rovers
- Cahir
- Killenaule

== Format change ==
The 2026 championship sees a new structure, with there only being twelve senior teams. The top two teams of each group will qualify for the knockout stage, with the best two group winners going straight to the semi-finals with the remaining four teams playing in the quarter-finals. The worst placed bottom team goes straight to a relegation final, with the other two bottom teams competing in a relegation semi-final. The winner of the relegation semi-final joins the three third placed teams in the Tom Cusack Cup.

== Group stage ==
The draw for the group stage took place on 2 April 2026.

Advance to knockout stage Advance to relegation play-offs

=== Group 1 ===
Team	Matches				Score			Pts
Team	Pld	W	D	L	For	Against	Diff	Pts
Clonmel Commercials	3	3	0	0	6-54	1-32	+37	6
Ardfinnan	3	2	0	1	4-39	4-44	-5	4
Ballina	3	1	0	2	4-36	2-42	0	2
Aherlow	3	0	0	3	0-31	7-42	-32	0

==== Results ====
31 July 2026 Round 1	Ballina	3-15 – 0-9	Aherlow	Drombane
19:30	Dara King 2-2, Steven O'Brien 0-7 (2tpr, 3f), JP Mbokha Tansia 1-1, Charlie King and Ben King (2f) 0-2 each, Eoghan Power 0-1	Report	Aaron Brazil 0-5 (4f), Diarmuid Looby, Liam Carew, Sean Burke and Andrew Murphy 0-1 each	Referee: Shane O'Neill

2 August 2026 Round 1	Clonmel Commercials	3-20 – 1-13	Ardfinnan	Monroe
14:00	Sean O'Connor 1-10 (2tpf, 3f), Peter McGarry 1-3 (1tpr), Cian Smith 1-2 (0-1f), Cathal Deely 0-2, Kevin Fahey, Joe Higgins and Killian Smith 0-1 each	Report	Michael Barlow 1-3 (0-2f), Shane Ryan 0-4 (1tpr), James Murphy 0-3 (1tpf), Andrew Browne 0-2 (1tpf), Conor Makim 0-1	Referee: Paul Guinan

15 August 2026 Round 2	Clonmel Commercials	1-20 – 0-11	Ballina	Dundrum
17:30	Sean O'Connor 1-4 (1-0p, 0-1f, 1tpr), Peter McGarry (1tpr) and Cian Smith (1tpr, 2f) 0-4 each, Joe Higgins (1tpr) and Darragh O'Connor (1tpr) 0-2 each, Cathal Deely, Kevin Fahey, Ross Peters and Tadhg Sheehan 0-1 each	Report	Steven O'Brien 0-5 (1tpr, 1tpf), Ben King 0-3 (1tpf, 1f), James Hanly 0-2 (1tpr), David Grace 0-1	Referee: Willie Fitzharris

15 August 2026 Round 2	Aherlow	0-14 – 2-13	Ardfinnan	New Inn
19:00	Mark Russell 0-8 (2tpr), Aaron Brazil 0-4 (1f), Ben Carey 0-2	Report	Gerry Cronin 1-1, Andrew Browne 0-4 (1tpf, 1 45', 1f), Sean Nagle 1-0, James Murphy and Shane Ryan (1f) 0-2 each, Darragh O'Leary, Johnny English, Luke O'Brien and Michael Barlow (1f) 0-1 each	Referee: Sean Lonergan

27 August 2026 Round 3	Clonmel Commercials	2-14 – 0-8	Aherlow	Lattin-Lisvernane
18:45	Cian Smith 1-3 (0-1f), Sean O'Connor 0-6 (2tpf), Killian Smith 1-0, Tadhg Sheehan, James Morris, Darragh O'Connor, Joe Higgins and Peter McGarry 0-1 each	Report	Mark Russell 0-3 (1tpr), Liam Carew 0-2 (2f), Aaron Brazil (1 45'), Sean Bourke and Anthony Murphy 0-1 each	Referee: Derek O'Mahoney

28 August 2026 Round 3	Ardfinnan	1-13 – 1-10	Ballina	Drombane
18:45	Michael Barlow 0-4 (2f), Gerry Cronin 1-0, Luke O'Brien, Ronan Myles and Shane Ryan 0-2 each, Darragh O'Leary, Billy Hewitt and James Murphy 0-1 each	Report	Matthew Power 1-1, Steven O'Brien and Ben King 0-2 each, Conor Power, David Grace, Charlie King, JP Mbokha Tansia and Dara King 0-1 each	Referee: Joseph Leahy

=== Group 2 ===
Team	Matches				Score			Pts
Team	Pld	W	D	L	For	Against	Diff	Pts
Kilsheelan–Kilcash	3	3	0	0	3-57	1-32	+31	6
JK Brackens	3	2	0	1	3-45	1-45	+6	4
Thurles Sarsfields	3	1	0	2	3-30	4-39	-12	2
Ballyporeen	3	0	0	3	1-33	4-49	-25	0

==== Results ====
31 July 2026 Round 1	Thurles Sarsfields	2-12 – 0-6	Ballyporeen	Dundrum
19:30	Liam McCormack 1-3 (0-2f), Kieran Costello 1-2 (1tpr), Ronan O'Brien 0-3 (1tpr), Paddy Creedon 0-2, Matthew Kelly and Cathal Hayes 0-1 each	Report	Conor Sweeney (1f) and Darragh Brennan (1tpr) 0-2 each, Darragh Lyons and Christy English 0-1 each	Referee: Seanie Peters

1 August 2026 Round 1	JK Brackens	0-9 – 0-23	Kilsheelan–Kilcash	Gortnahoe
19:00	Jack Kennedy 0-5 (3f), Paddy Cadell 0-3, Conor Cadell 0-1	Report	Jamie Roche 0-9 (3tpr, 2f), Conor Freaney, Lucas Shiel, Micheal Freaney, Barry Kehoe and Shane Garland (1f) 0-2 each, Paul Maher, Mickey McGuire, Mark Kehoe and Billy Murphy 0-1 each	Referee: Brian Tyrrell

14 August 2026 Round 2	Ballyporeen	1-15 – 1-19	JK Brackens	Boherlahan
19:15	Conor Sweeney 1-6 (1tpf), Darragh Brennan 0-4 (1tpf), Christy English 0-2, Seamus O'Callaghan, Kevin O'Mahoney and Jack Kearney 0-1 each	Report	Jamie Ormond 1-5 (1tpr), Jack Kennedy 0-5 (4f), Shane Doyle (1tpr) and Eanna McBride 0-3 each, Dean McEnroe 0-2, Ned Delaney 0-1	Referee: Derek O'Mahoney

15 August 2026 Round 2	Kilsheelan–Kilcash	2-16 – 1-11	Thurles Sarsfields	Cashel
15:00	Jamie Roche 0-10 (3tpf, 2f), Mark Kehoe 2-0, Tommy O'Connor and Barry Kehoe 0-2 each, Shane Garland and Micheal Freaney 0-1 each	Report	Liam McCormack 0-4 (4f), Paddy Creedon 0-3 (1tpr), Kieran Costello 1-0, James Armstrong 0-2, Ronan O'Brien and Kevin Bracken 0-1 each	Referee: Martin Doyle

30 August 2026 Round 3	Ballyporeen	0-12 – 1-18	Kilsheelan–Kilcash	Ardfinnan
14:00	Darragh Brennan 0-6 (1tpf, 2f), Darragh Lyons, Tommy Sweeney (1tpr) and Conor Sweeney (2f) 0-2 each	Report	Jamie Roche 0-7 (1tpf, 4f), Micheal Freaney 1-2, Tommy O'Connor 0-4 (1tpr), Billy Murphy 0-2 (1tpr), Barry Kehoe, Senan Butler and Shane Garland (1 45') 0-1 each	Referee: Brian Tyrrell

30 August 2026 Round 3	JK Brackens	2-17 – 0-7	Thurles Sarsfields	The Ragg
14:00	Jack Kennedy 0-10 (4f, 2tpf), Jamie Ormond 1-1, Adrian Bourke 1-0, Paddy Cadell 0-3 (1tpr), Ned Walsh, Ned Delaney and Conor Cadell 0-1 each	Report	Paddy Creedon 0-2 (1tpr), James Armstrong, Aidan Ryan, Ronan O'Brien, David Bourke and Liam McCormack (1f) 0-1 each	Referee: Willie Fitzharris

=== Group 3 ===
Team	Matches				Score			Pts
Team	Pld	W	D	L	For	Against	Diff	Pts
Moyle Rovers	3	3	0	0	2-36	1-22	+17	6
Loughmore–Castleiney	3	2	0	1	3-36	0-30	+15	4
Upperchurch–Drombane	3	1	0	2	1-35	3-33	-4	2
Grangemockler–Ballyneale	3	0	0	3	0-27	2-49	-28	0

==== Results ====
31 July 2026 Round 1	Loughmore–Castleiney	1-9 – 0-13	Moyle Rovers	Boherlahan
19:30	Joey Quinn 0-5 (1tpr, 2f), Philip O'Connell 1-0 (p), Noel McGrath (1tpr) and Ed Connolly 0-2 each	Report	Liam Boland 0-8 (3f, 1tpf), Riain Quigley 0-3, Brian McKeown and Paddy O'Keeffe 0-1 each	Referee: Derek O'Mahoney

2 August 2026 Round 1	Upperchurch–Drombane	1-18 – 0-14	Grangemockler–Ballyneale	Cashel
15:30	Luke Shanahan 0-8 (1f), Paul Shanahan 1-4 (2tpf), Conor Fahey 0-3 (1tpr), Sean Griffin, Ger Grant and Philip O'Dwyer 0-1 each	Report	Mark O'Meara 0-6 (2f, 2tpr), David Power 0-4 (2tpf), Thomas Regan 0-2 (1tpr), Ben Comerford and Manus McFadden 0-1 each	Referee: Willie Fitzharris

15 August 2026 Round 2	Grangemockler–Ballyneale	0-8 – 1-18	Loughmore–Castleiney	Gortnahoe
18:00	Manus McFadden and Sean O'Meara 0-2 each, Joey Lyons, Brian Walsh, Paudie O'Shea and Thomas Regan 0-1 each	Report	Eoin O'Connell 1-3, Liam McGrath 0-3 (1f), Philip O'Connell, Shane Hennessy (1tpf) and Brian McGrath 0-2 each, Noel McGrath, Eamonn Connolly, Lorcan Egan, John Meagher, John McGrath and Ciaran McGrath 0-1 each	Referee: Seanie Peters

16 August 2026 Round 2	Moyle Rovers	2-10 – 0-8	Upperchurch–Drombane	Golden
16:00	Liam Boland 1-4 (0-4f), Paddy O'Keeffe 1-3 (1tpr), Luke Boland, John Cronin and Luke Foley (1f) 0-1 each	Report	Luke Shanahan 0-6 (1tpf, 2f), Paul Shanahan 0-2 (2f)	Referee: Brian Tyrrell

29 August 2026 Round 3	Loughmore–Castleiney	1-9 – 0-9	Upperchurch–Drombane	Holycross
18:00	Liam McGrath 0-5 (4f), Eoin O'Connell 1-0, Joey Quinn 0-2, John McGrath and Shane Hennessy (1f) 0-1 each	Report	Keith Ryan 0-2, Conor Fahey, Paul Shanahan, Paddy Phelan, Dean Carew, Niall Grant, Luke Shanahan and Sean Griffin 0-1 each	Referee: Sean Lonergan

29 August 2026 Round 3	Grangemockler–Ballyneale	0-5 – 0-13	Moyle Rovers	Fethard
18:00	Leon Kennedy and Paudie O'Shea 0-2 each, Sean Daly 0-1	Report	Paddy O'Keeffe 0-4 (1tpr), Riain Quigley 0-3 (1f), Cathal McKeown, Brian McKeown, Dean English, Shane Foley, John Cronin and Luke Foley (1f) 0-1 each	Referee: Seamus Delaney

== Relegation ==
=== Relegation semi-final ===
19 September 2026 Relegation semi-final	Ballyporeen	2-10 – 1-12	Grangemockler–Ballyneale	Clonmel Sportsfield
14:00	Darragh Brennan 1-7 (0-3f), Tommy Sweeney 1-2, Conor Sweeney 0-1	Report	Conor Maguire 1-2, Mark O'Meara 0-5 (1tpr, 2f), David Power (1f), Ben Comerford, Brian Walsh, Manus McFadden and Paudie O'Shea 0-1 each	Referee: Sean Lonergan

=== Relegation final ===
3 October 2026 Relegation final	Aherlow	0-15 – 0-14	Grangemockler–Ballyneale	Ardfinnan
16:00	Liam Carew (1tpr) and Aaron Brazil (1f, 1 45') 0-4 each, Paddy Chapman and Mark Russell (1tpr) 0-2 each, Darragh O'Brien, Jack O'Halloran and Ben Carey 0-1 each	Report	Mark O'Meara (1f, 1tpr) 0-4 each, Sean O'Meara 0-2, David Power (1 45'), Thomas Regan, Ben Comerford, Manus McFadden, Leon Kennedy, Paudie O'Shea, Conor Maguire and James O'Meara 0-1 each	Referee: Seamus Delaney

== Tom Cusack cup ==
=== Final ===
16 October 2026 Final	Ballyporeen	1-7 – 2-14	Upperchurch–Drombane	Ballyporeen
19:00	Darragh Brennan 1-3 (1-1f), Sam McGrath, Conor Sweeney, Christy English and Oisin Power 0-1 each	Report	Luke Shanahan (4f) and Paul Shanahan (1tpf, 3f) 0-5 each, Oisin Treacy 1-1, Dean Carew 1-0, Philip O'Dwyer 0-2, Sean Ryan 0-1	Referee: Brian Tyrrell

== Knockout stage ==
=== Bracket ===
Quarter-Finals; 19 & 20 September 2026
Moyle Rovers	2-18
Ardfinnan	2-14
JK Brackens	1-13
Loughmore–Castleiney	5-13

Semi-Finals; 3 & 4 October 2026
Moyle Rovers	0-8
Clonmel Commercials	0-14
Loughmore–Castleiney	2-16
Kilsheelan–Kilcash	1-18

Final; 18 October 2026
Clonmel Commercials	0-13
Loughmore–Castleiney	0-15

=== Quarter-finals ===
19 September 2026 Quarter-final	Moyle Rovers	2-18 – 2-14	Ardfinnan	Clonmel Sportsfield
16:00	Paddy O'Keeffe 0-7 (3f), Rian Quigley 0-6 (1f), Dean English 1-2, Luke Foley 1-0, Liam Boland 0-3 (1tpr)	Report	Michael Barlow 0-8 (1tpr, 5f), Jack O'Neill 1-1, Shane Ryan 0-4, Billy Hewitt 1-0, Luke O'Brien 0-1	Referee: Brian Tyrrell

20 September 2026 Quarter-final	JK Brackens	1-13 – 5-13	Loughmore–Castleiney	Holycross
15:00	Jack Kennedy 0-6 (3f, 1tpf), Eanna McBride 1-0, Dean McEnroe 0-3 (1tpr), Jordan Moloney 0-2, Jamie Ormond and Ned Delaney 0-1 each	Report	Liam McGrath 2-3 (0-3f), Joey Quinn and Brian McGrath 1-2 each, John McGrath 1-0, Eoin O'Connell 0-3 (1tpr), Ciaran Connolly 0-2, Aidan McGrath 0-1	Referee: Willie Fitzharris

=== Semi-finals ===
3 October 2026 Semi-final	Moyle Rovers	0-8 – 0-14	Clonmel Commercials	Kilsheelan
15:45	John Cronin (1f), Luke Foley (1tpf), Riain Quigley and Liam Boland (1f) 0-2 each	Report	Sean O'Connor 0-6 (2tpr, 1f), Peter McGarry (1tpr) and Cian Smith (1f) 0-2 each, Séamus Kennedy, Kevin Fahey, James Morris and Cathal Deely 0-1 each	Referee: Derek O'Mahoney

4 October 2026 Semi-final	Loughmore–Castleiney	2-16 – 1-18	Kilsheelan–Kilcash	Dundrum
15:45	Liam McGrath 0-8 (4f, 2tpr), Philip O'Connell 1-2 (0-1f), Brian McGrath] 1-0, Noel McGrath (1tpr) and Eoin O'Connell (1tpr) 0-2 each, John McGrath and John Ryan 0-1 each	Report	Paul Maher 1-2 (1tpr), Tommy O'Connor and Micheal Freaney (2tpr) 0-4 each, Mark Kehoe 0-3 (1tpr), Jamie Roche (2f) and Conor Freaney 0-2 each, Shane Garland 0-1	Referee: Sean Lonergan

=== Final ===
18 October 2026 Final	Clonmel Commercials	0-13 – 0-15	Loughmore–Castleiney	Semple Stadium
16:00	Cian Smith 0-4 (2f), Peter McGarry (1tpr) and Sean O'Connor (1f) 0-3 each, Tadhg Condon, Séamus Kennedy and Ross Peters 0-1 each	Report	Liam McGrath 0-7 (1tpr, 4f), Eoin O'Connell (1tpr), Joey Quinn and Ed Connolly 0-2 each, Tommy Maher and John McGrath 0-1 each	Referee: Willie Fitzharris

== Championship statistics ==
=== Top scorers ===
==== Overall ====
Rank	Player	Club	Tally	Total	Matches	Average
1	Sean O'Connor	Clonmel Commercials	2-29	35	5	7
2	Liam McGrath	Loughmore–Castleiney	2-26	32	5	6.4
3	Jamie Roche	Kilsheelan–Kilcash	0-28	28	4	7
4	Jack Kennedy	JK Brackens	0-26	26	4	6.5
5	Cian Smith	Clonmel Commercials	2-15	21	5	4.2
6	Liam Boland	Moyle Rovers	1-17	20	4	5
7	Michael Barlow	Ardfinnan	1-16	19	4	4.75
8	Paddy O'Keeffe	Moyle Rovers	1-15	18	5	3.6
9	Eoin O'Connell	Loughmore–Castleiney	2-10	16	6	2.67
9	Peter McGarry	Clonmel Commercials	1-13	16	5	3.2

==== In a single game ====
Rank	Player	Club	Tally	Total	Opposition
1	Sean O'Connor	Clonmel Commercials	1-10	13	Ardfinnan
2	Jamie Roche	Kilsheelan–Kilcash	0-10	10	Thurles Sarsfields
2	Jack Kennedy	JK Brackens	0-10	10	Thurles Sarsfields
4	Liam McGrath	Loughmore–Castleiney	2-3	9	JK Brackens
4	Conor Sweeney	Ballyporeen	1-6	9	JK Brackens
4	Jamie Roche	Kilsheelan–Kilcash	0-9	9	JK Brackens
7	Dara King	Ballina	2-2	8	Aherlow
7	Jamie Ormond	JK Brackens	1-5	8	Balyporeen
7	Liam Boland	Moyle Rovers	0-8	8	Loughmore–Castleiney
7	Luke Shanahan	Upperchurch–Drombane	0-8	8	Grangemockler–Ballyneale
7	Mark Russell	Aherlow	0-8	8	Ardfinnan
7	Michael Barlow	Ardfinnan	0-8	8	Moyle Rovers
7	Liam McGrath	Loughmore–Castleiney	0-8	8	Kilsheelan–Kilcash
