= John Meagher (hurler) =

Irish hurler

Sport
- Sport: Hurling
- Position: Half-Back
Club
- Years: Club
- Loughmore–Castleiney
Club titles
| | Football | Hurling |
| Tipperary titles | 5 | 2 |
Inter-county
| Years | County | Apps (scores) |
| 2015– | Tipperary | 0 (0-0) |

John Meagher (born 26 August 1995) is an Irish sportsperson. He plays hurling with his local club Loughmore–Castleiney and with the Tipperary senior inter-county team since 2015.

== Career ==
Meagher was named in the Tipperary squad for the 2015 National Hurling League and made his league debut on 22 February against Galway when he came on as a late substitute.

== Career statistics ==
=== Club ===
==== Hurling ====
As of match played 22 August 2026

| Team | Year | Tipperary | | Munster | | Total | |
| Team | Year | Apps | Score | Apps | Score | Apps | Score |
|---|---|---|---|---|---|---|---|
| Loughmore–Castleiney | 2011 | 1 | 0-00 | — | | 1 | 0-00 |
| Loughmore–Castleiney | 2012 | 3 | 0-00 | — | | 3 | 0-00 |
| Loughmore–Castleiney | 2013 | 3 | 0-01 | 1 | 0-00 | 4 | 0-01 |
| Loughmore–Castleiney | 2014 | 0 | 0-00 | — | | 0 | 0-00 |
| Loughmore–Castleiney | 2015 | 3 | 0-01 | — | | 3 | 0-01 |
| Loughmore–Castleiney | 2016 | 2 | 0-04 | — | | 2 | 0-04 |
| Loughmore–Castleiney | 2017 | 2 | 0-00 | — | | 2 | 0-00 |
| Loughmore–Castleiney | 2018 | 5 | 0-02 | — | | 5 | 0-02 |
| Loughmore–Castleiney | 2019 | 4 | 0-01 | — | | 4 | 0-01 |
| Loughmore–Castleiney | 2020 | 6 | 0-02 | — | | 6 | 0-02 |
| Loughmore–Castleiney | 2021 | 8 | 0-01 | 1 | 0-00 | 9 | 0-01 |
| Loughmore–Castleiney | 2022 | 4 | 0-01 | — | | 4 | 0-01 |
| Loughmore–Castleiney | 2023 | — | | — | | 0 | 0-00 |
| Loughmore–Castleiney | 2024 | — | | 1 | 0-01 | 1 | 0-01 |
| Loughmore–Castleiney | 2025 | — | | — | | 0 | 0-00 |
| Loughmore–Castleiney | 2026 | 3 | 0-01 | — | | 3 | 0-01 |
| Total | | 44 | 0-14 | 3 | 0-01 | 47 | 0-15 |

==== Football ====
As of match played 18 October 2026

| Team | Year | Tipperary | | Munster | | Total | |
| Team | Year | Apps | Score | Apps | Score | Apps | Score |
|---|---|---|---|---|---|---|---|
| Loughmore–Castleiney | 2010 | 1 | 0-00 | — | | 1 | 0-00 |
| Loughmore–Castleiney | 2011 | 1 | 0-00 | — | | 1 | 0-00 |
| Loughmore–Castleiney | 2012 | 2 | 0-00 | — | | 2 | 0-00 |
| Loughmore–Castleiney | 2013 | 4 | 0-00 | 1 | 0-00 | 5 | 0-00 |
| Loughmore–Castleiney | 2014 | 3 | 0-00 | — | | 3 | 0-00 |
| Loughmore–Castleiney | 2015 | 3 | 0-00 | — | | 3 | 0-00 |
| Loughmore–Castleiney | 2016 | 4 | 0-00 | 1 | 0-00 | 5 | 0-00 |
| Loughmore–Castleiney | 2017 | 1 | 0-00 | — | | 1 | 0-00 |
| Loughmore–Castleiney | 2018 | 3 | 0-00 | — | | 3 | 0-00 |
| Loughmore–Castleiney | 2019 | 5 | 0-00 | — | | 5 | 0-00 |
| Loughmore–Castleiney | 2020 | 5 | 0-00 | — | | 5 | 0-00 |
| Loughmore–Castleiney | 2021 | 5 | 0-00 | 1 | 0-00 | 6 | 0-00 |
| Loughmore–Castleiney | 2022 | 2 | 0-00 | — | | 2 | 0-00 |
| Loughmore–Castleiney | 2023 | — | | — | | 0 | 0-00 |
| Loughmore–Castleiney | 2024 | — | | 2 | 0-00 | 2 | 0-00 |
| Loughmore–Castleiney | 2025 | — | | — | | 0 | 0-00 |
| Loughmore–Castleiney | 2026 | 4 | 0-01 | 0 | 0-00 | 4 | 0-01 |
| Total | | 43 | 0-01 | 5 | 0-00 | 48 | 0-01 |

=== Inter-county ===
==== Hurling ====
As of match played 24 April 2022

| Team | Year | National League | | | Munster | | All-Ireland | | Total | |
| Team | Year | Division | Apps | Score | Apps | Score | Apps | Score | Apps | Score |
|---|---|---|---|---|---|---|---|---|---|---|
| Tipperary | 2015 | Division 1A | 2 | 0-00 | 0 | 0-00 | 0 | 0-00 | 2 | 0-00 |
| Tipperary | 2016 | Division 1A | 2 | 0-00 | 0 | 0-00 | 0 | 0-00 | 2 | 0-00 |
| Tipperary | 2017 | Division 1A | 1 | 0-00 | 0 | 0-00 | 0 | 0-00 | 1 | 0-00 |
| Tipperary | 2018 | Division 1A | — | | — | | — | | 0 | 0-00 |
| Tipperary | 2019 | Division 1A | — | | — | | — | | 0 | 0-00 |
| Tipperary | 2020 | Division 1A | — | | 1 | 0-00 | 0 | 0-00 | 0 | 0-00 |
| Tipperary | 2021 | Division 1A | 1 | 0-00 | 0 | 0-00 | 0 | 0-00 | 1 | 0-00 |
| Tipperary | 2022 | Division 1B | 0 | 0-00 | 0 | 0-00 | — | | 0 | 0-00 |
| Career total | | | 6 | 0-00 | 1 | 0-00 | 0 | 0-00 | 7 | 0-00 |

==== Football ====
As of match played 1 March 2020

| Team | Year | National League | | | Munster | | All-Ireland | | Total | |
| Team | Year | Division | Apps | Score | Apps | Score | Apps | Score | Apps | Score |
|---|---|---|---|---|---|---|---|---|---|---|
| Tipperary | 2018 | Division 2 | 6 | 0-00 | 2 | 0-00 | 1 | 0-00 | 9 | 0-00 |
| Tipperary | 2019 | Division 2 | 7 | 0-00 | 1 | 0-00 | 1 | 0-00 | 9 | 0-00 |
| Tipperary | 2020 | Division 3 | 5 | 0-00 | — | | — | | 5 | 0-00 |
| Career total | | | 18 | 0-00 | 3 | 0-00 | 2 | 0-00 | 23 | 0-00 |

== Honours ==
Loughmore–Castleiney

- Tipperary Senior Hurling Championship (2): 2013, 2021
- Tipperary Senior Football Championship (5): 2013, 2014, 2016, 2021, 2026
- Mid Tipperary Senior Hurling Championship (3): 2011, 2016, 2018
- Mid Tipperary Senior Football Championship (5): 2012, 2015, 2016, 2017, 2018

Tipperary

- All-Ireland Minor Football Championship (1): 2011
- Munster Minor Football Championship (1): 2011
