= James Healy =

James Healy may refer to:

- James Augustine Healy (1830–1900), Irish and African-American Roman Catholic priest and bishop
- James Andrew Healy (1895–1983), American World War I flying ace
- James Healy (geologist) (1910–1994), New Zealand geologist, volcanologist and music critic
- James N. Healy (1916–1993), Irish actor, writer and theatre producer
- Jim Healy (trade unionist) (1898–1961), Australian trade unionist and Communist activist
- Jim Healy (sports commentator) (1923–1994)
- Jim Healy (Gaelic footballer) (born 1952), Irish Gaelic footballer
- James Healy (Home and Away), a fictional character from the Australian soap opera Home and Away
