= Liam McGrath (hurler, born 1993) =

Irish hurler and Gaelic footballer

Sport
- Sport: Hurling and Gaelic Football
- Position: Corner-Forward
Club
- Years: Club
- Loughmore-Castleiney
Club titles
	Football	Hurling
Tipperary titles	6	4
Inter-county
Years	County	Apps (scores)
2014–	Tipperary	0 (0-0)

Liam McGrath is an Irish sportsperson. He plays hurling and Gaelic football with his local club Loughmore-Castleiney and previously with the Tipperary senior inter-county team after making his debut in 2014.

He is the first cousin of the McGrath brothers, Noel McGrath, John McGrath and Brian McGrath.

== Career ==
McGrath captained Tipperary to win the 2011 All-Ireland Minor Football Championship. He was named in the Tipperary squad for the 2014 National Hurling League and made his league debut on 15 February against Waterford when he came on as a substitute.

== Career statistics ==
=== Club ===
==== Hurling ====
As of match played 5 September 2026

Team	Year	Tipperary		Munster		Total	
Team	Year	Apps	Score	Apps	Score	Apps	Score
Loughmore-Castleiney	2010	2	1-14	—		2	1-14
Loughmore-Castleiney	2011	1	0-07	—		1	0-07
Loughmore-Castleiney	2012	3	0-15	—		3	0-15
Loughmore-Castleiney	2013	4	1-08	1	1-03	5	2-11
Loughmore-Castleiney	2014	5	3-26	—		5	3-26
Loughmore-Castleiney	2015	2	0-08	—		2	0-08
Loughmore-Castleiney	2016	3	1-08	—		3	1-08
Loughmore-Castleiney	2017	4	0-07	—		4	0-07
Loughmore-Castleiney	2018	5	1-15	—		5	1-15
Loughmore-Castleiney	2019	4	3-13	—		4	3-13
Loughmore-Castleiney	2020	—		—		0	0-00
Loughmore-Castleiney	2021	5	1-08	1	0-00	6	1-08
Loughmore-Castleiney	2022	4	0-25	—		4	0-25
Loughmore-Castleiney	2023	5	1-14	—		5	1-14
Loughmore-Castleiney	2024	6	2-06	1	0-00	6	2-06
Loughmore-Castleiney	2025	5	1-09	1	1-00	6	2-09
Loughmore-Castleiney	2026	3	2-09	—		3	2-09
Total		61	17-192	4	2-03	65	19-195

==== Football ====
As of match played 18 October 2026

Team	Year	Tipperary		Munster		Total	
Team	Year	Apps	Score	Apps	Score	Apps	Score
Loughmore-Castleiney	2010	4	1-01	—		4	1-01
Loughmore-Castleiney	2011	1	1-00	—		1	1-00
Loughmore-Castleiney	2012	4	3-07	—		4	3-07
Loughmore-Castleiney	2013	5	0-09	1	0-00	6	0-09
Loughmore-Castleiney	2014	6	2-15	—		6	2-15
Loughmore-Castleiney	2015	4	2-10	—		4	2-10
Loughmore-Castleiney	2016	5	0-20	1	0-06	6	0-26
Loughmore-Castleiney	2017	4	1-24	—		4	1-24
Loughmore-Castleiney	2018	5	1-26	—		5	1-26
Loughmore-Castleiney	2019	5	2-13	—		5	2-13
Loughmore-Castleiney	2020	—		—		0	0-00
Loughmore-Castleiney	2021	5	0-04	1	0-01	6	0-05
Loughmore-Castleiney	2022	5	2-16	—		5	2-16
Loughmore-Castleiney	2023	4	0-24	—		4	0-24
Loughmore-Castleiney	2024	6	1-27	2	0-06	8	1-33
Loughmore-Castleiney	2025	5	0-24	—		5	0-24
Loughmore-Castleiney	2026	5	2-26	0	0-00	5	2-26
Total		73	18-246	5	0-13	78	18-259

=== Inter-county ===
==== Hurling ====
Team	Year	National League			Munster		All-Ireland		Total	
Team	Year	Division	Apps	Score	Apps	Score	Apps	Score	Apps	Score
Tipperary	2014	Division 1A	2	0-00	0	0-00	0	0-00	2	0-00
Tipperary	2015	Division 1A	0	0-00	0	0-00	0	0-00	0	0-00
Tipperary	2016	Division 1A	1	0-00	0	0-00	0	0-00	1	0-00
Career total			3	0-00	0	0-00	0	0-00	3	0-00

==== Football ====
As of match played 3 June 2023

Team	Year	National League			Munster		All-Ireland		Tailteann Cup		Total	
Team	Year	Division	Apps	Score	Apps	Score	Apps	Score	Apps	Score	Apps	Score
Tipperary	2017	Division 3	7	0-05	1	0-01	2	0-00	—		10	0-06
Tipperary	2018	Division 2	7	3-17	2	0-14	1	0-04	—		10	3-35
Tipperary	2019	Division 2	7	1-15	1	0-02	1	0-02	—		9	1-19
Tipperary	2020	Division 3	—		—		—		—		0	0-00
Tipperary	2021	Division 3	—		—		—		—		0	0-00
Tipperary	2022	Division 4	—		2	0-00	—		1	0-02	3	0-02
Tipperary	2023	Division 3	5	0-01	0	0-00	—		1	0-01	6	0-02
Career total			26	4-38	6	0-17	4	0-06	2	0-03	38	4-64

== Honours ==
Loughmore-Castleiney

- Tipperary Senior Hurling Championship (4): 2013, 2021, 2024 (c), 2025 (c)
- Tipperary Senior Football Championship (6): 2013, 2014, 2016, 2021, 2024, 2026
- Mid Tipperary Senior Hurling Championship (5): 2011, 2016, 2018, 2024 (c), 2026 (c)
- Mid Tipperary Senior Football Championship (6): 2012, 2015, 2016 (c), 2017, 2018, 2023

Tipperary

- All-Ireland Minor Football Championship (1): 2011(c)
- Munster Minor Football Championship (1): 2011
- National Football League Division 3 (1): 2017

Achievements
Preceded by Shea McGarrity (Tyrone)	All-Ireland Minor Football Final winning captain 2011	Succeeded by David Byrne (Dublin)
