= John Cormack =

Irish retired hurler

Personal information
- Native name: Seán Mac Cormaic (Irish)
- Born: 1964 (age 61–62) Loughmore, County Tipperary, Ireland

Sport
- Sport: Hurling
- Position: Midfield
Club
- Years: Club
- Loughmore–Castleiney
Club titles
	Football	Hurling
Tipperary titles	2	1
Inter-county*
Years	County	Apps (scores)
1988–1989	Tipperary	3 (0-02)
Inter-county titles
- Munster titles: 1
- All-Irelands: 1
- NHL: 0
- All Stars: 0
- *Inter County team apps and scores correct as of 17:26, 28 March 2018.

John Cormack (born 1964) is an Irish retired hurler. His league and championship career with the Tipperary senior team lasted the 1988–89 season.

Born in Loughmore, County Tipperary, Cormack came to prominence as a hurler and Gaelic footballer with Templemore CBS. He first appeared for the Loughmore–Castleiney club at juvenile and underage levels, before eventually joining the club's senior teams as a dual player. During a successful club career, Cormack won three county championship medals in both codes.

Cormack made his debut on the inter-county scene when he was selected for the Tipperary minor team in 1981. He enjoyed two championship seasons with the minor team, culminating with the winning of an All-Ireland medal in 1982. He subsequently joined the under-21 team, winning an All-Ireland medals in 1985. Cormack joined the Tipperary senior team during the 1987–88 league. That season he won his sole All-Ireland medal, as well as a Munster medal.

== Honours ==
=== Loughmore–Castleiney ===
- Tipperary Senior Football Championship (2): 1987, 1992
- Tipperary Senior Hurling Championship (1): 1988

=== Tipperary ===
- All-Ireland Senior Hurling Championship (1): 1989
- Munster Senior Hurling Championship (1): 1989
