= Tom Larkin (hurler) =

Irish hurler (1931–2020)

Personal information
- Native name: Tomás Ó Lorcáin (Irish)
- Born: 1931 Kilsheelan, County Tipperary, Ireland
- Died: 5 April 2020 (aged 88) Fethard, County Tipperary, Ireland
- Occupation: Lorry driver
- Height: 5 ft 9 in (175 cm)

Sport
- Sport: Hurling
- Position: Centre-forward
Clubs
- Years: Club
- Kilsheelan–Kilcash; Na Piarsaigh
Club titles
- Tipperary titles: 0
Inter-county
Years	County	Apps (scores)
1958–1965	Tipperary	5 (0-04)
Inter-county titles
- Munster titles: 1
- All-Irelands: 1
- NHL: 1

Thomas Larkin (1931 – 5 April 2020) was an Irish hurler and Gaelic footballer who played for Tipperary Championship club Kilsheelan–Kilcash. He played for the Tipperary senior hurling team for three seasons, during which time he usually lined out as a centre-forward.

== Playing career ==
=== Tipperary ===
During the 1957-58 National League, Larkin was drafted onto the Tipperary senior hurling team. He made his Munster Championship debut on 1 June 1958 when he was introduced as a substitute for John Haugh in a 2-10 to 1-05 defeat of Limerick. On 6 July 1958, Larkin won a Munster Championship medal after lining out at centre-forward in Tipperary's 4-12 to 1-05 victory over Waterford in the final. After illness rule him out of a starting fifteen place for the All-Ireland semi-final, he was back at centre-forward for the All-Ireland final against Galway on 7 September 1958. Larkin scored two points from play and ended the game with an All-Ireland medal after the 4-09 to 2-05 victory.

On 3 May 1959, Larkin was selected at right corner-forward when Tipperary qualified to play Waterford in the National League final. He was held scoreless throughout but ended the game with a winners' medal after the 0-15 to 0-07 victory. Larkin was dropped from the panel after the Munster Championship.

== Honours ==
Tipperary

- All-Ireland Senior Hurling Championship (1): 1958
- Munster Senior Hurling Championship (1): 1958
- National Hurling League (1): 1958-59
