= Eddie Connolly =

Irish hurler

Personal information
- Born: 29 October 1985 Loughmore, County Tipperary, Ireland
- Died: 17 September 2015 (aged 29) Loughmore, County Tipperary, Ireland

Sport
- Sport: Hurling
- Position: Centre back
Club
- Years: Club
- Loughmore–Castleiney
Inter-county
- Years: County
- 2011–2013: Tipperary

Eddie Connolly (29 October 1985 – 17 September 2015) was an Irish hurler. He played for his local club Loughmore–Castleiney and was a member of the Tipperary senior inter-county team.

On 13 March 2011, he made his senior debut for Tipperary against Offaly, starting at right corner back in the National Hurling League in a 1–20 to 0–10 victory. Eddie was an accomplished defender in hurling and Gaelic football, playing senior hurling and football for the premier county. Eddie captained Tipperary to an All-Ireland Intermediate hurling championship in 2012. He was also a distinguished player for his college Dublin Institute of technology.

Connolly was diagnosed with brain cancer in 2013. He died on 17 September 2015 at the age of 29.
