= David Kennedy (hurler) =

Irish hurler

Personal information
- Native name: Daithí Ó Cinnéide (Irish)
- Born: 9 April 1976 (age 50) Loughmore, County Tipperary
- Occupation: Garda Síochána

Sport
- Sport: Hurling
- Position: Centre--back
Club
- Years: Club
- Loughmore–Castleiney
Club titles
- Munster titles: 1
	Football	Hurling
Tipperary titles	2	2
Inter-county
Years	County	Apps (scores)
1999-2005 2007-present	Tipperary; Kildare	26 (0-0); 9 (0-0)
Inter-county titles
- Munster titles: 1
- All-Irelands: 1
- NHL: 2

David Kennedy (born 9 April 1976) originally from County Tipperary, plays with Loughmore–Castleiney and has been a member of the Kildare senior inter-county team since 2007. He joined the Tipperary Senior Hurling panel in 1998 and has won 2 National Hurling League medals (1999 and 2001) and a Munster and All-Ireland Senior Hurling medal in 2001 at centre-back. He was man of the match in the drawn Munster semi-final against Clare in 1999. He was also on the Munster team that played in the 1999 Railway Cup. David played minor hurling with Tipp in 1993 and 1994. He won a Munster medal in 1993 and won an All-Ireland Under-21 medal in 1995 as a sub. He played both minor and Under-21 football for Tipp. At schools level, he won an All-Ireland B Colleges medal with Templemore C.B.S. At club level, he won a County Under-21 B medal in 1994. David is 6 feet 1 inch in height and weighed 13 stone for the 2001 All-Ireland Final.
