= Paul Ormond =

Irish hurler and Gaelic footballer (born 1977)

Personal information
- Native name: Pól Ó Rua (Irish)
- Born: 18 August 1977 (age 49) Templemore, County Tipperary

Sport
- Sport: Hurling
- Position: Left corner-back
Club
- Years: Club
- Loughmore–Castleiney
Club titles
- Tipperary titles: 1
- Munster titles: 1
Inter-county
- Years: County
- 1999-2002, 2006: Tipperary
Inter-county titles
- Munster titles: 2
- All-Irelands: 1
- NHL: 3

Paul Ormond (born 18 August 1977 near Templemore, County Tipperary) is an Irish sportsperson. He plays hurling with his local club Loughmore–Castleiney and the Tipperary senior inter-county team. Ormond was the official captain of the Tipperary team in 2008, however, when Ormond or any other Loughmore player failed to secure a regular starting place, Eoin Kelly fulfilled the role of captain.

== Early life ==
Paul Ormond was born just outside Templemore, County Tipperary in 1977. He was educated locally and later attended Our Lady's Secondary School in Templemore. Here Ormond's hurling skills came to the fore and he won an All-Ireland 'B' Colleges' medal.

== Playing career ==
=== Club ===
Ormond plays his club hurling with his local Loughmore–Castleiney club in Tipperary and has enjoyed some success. His first major success was a county under-21 'B' medal in 1994. In 2007 Ormond won a senior county title with the club. This was later converted into a Munster club title.

=== Inter-county ===
Ormond first came to prominence on the inter-county scene as a dual player at minor level. He won a Munster minor title with the Tipperary Gaelic football team in 1995. He later played with the under-21 hurling and football teams, however, he enjoyed little success. In 1998 Ormond was a substitute on both the Tipperary senior football and hurling teams, however, there was no provincial success. In 1999 he made his senior championship debut in the game against Clare. Tipperary lost on that occasion, however, two years later in 2001 Ormond had his first major success when he collected a National Hurling League medal. Later that same year Tipperary defeated Limerick in the provincial final, giving Ormond his first Munster medal. His team later reached the All-Ireland final where old rivals Galway provided the opposition. Tipp won the day again giving Ormond an All-Ireland medal. Since then Tipperary's hurling fortunes have taken a downturn. The team made a number of appearances in the latter stages of the All-Ireland series, however, a return to the big stage remained elusive. Tipp captured another National League title in 2008, however, Ormond, in spite of being the official team captain, did not play any part in the final victory.

== Teams ==
Preceded by John O'Brien	Tipperary Senior Hurling Captain; 2008	Succeeded by Willie Ryan
