= 2016–17 Harty Cup =

Hurling tournament

2016–17 Dr Harty Cup
- Dates: 12 October 2016 – 18 February 2017
- Teams: 19
- Champions: Our Lady's Secondary School (2nd title); Paddy Cadell (captain); Tom Byrnes (manager)
- Runners-up: St Colman's College; Niall O'Leary (captain); Flanann Cleary (manager)

Tournament statistics
- Matches played: 30
- Goals scored: 90 (3 per match)
- Points scored: 825 (27.5 per match)
- Top scorer(s): Darragh Woods (3-38)

The 2016–17 Dr Harty Cup was the 97th staging of the Harty Cup since its establishment in hurling by the Munster Council of Gaelic Athletic Association in 1918. The group stage placings were released in July 2016. The competition ran from 12 October 2016 to 18 February 2017.

Ardscoil Rís unsuccessfully defended its title in the quarter-final replay against Midleton CBS

The Harty Cup final was played on 18 February 2017 at the Gaelic Grounds in Limerick, between Our Lady's Secondary School and St Colman's College, in what was their second meeting in the final overall and a first meeting in 15 years. Our Lady's Secondary School won the match by 2–22 to 1–06 to claim their second Harty Cup title overall and last final title meeting after a hiatus since 1978.

Thurles CBS's Darragh Woods was the top scorer with 3-38.

== Format change ==
There was a restructuring of the group stage, resulting in an increase in the number of groups. 19 teams entered the Harty Cup, with eight groups being created. Five groups contained two teams and three groups contained three teams. Two teams advanced from each of the groups to the knockout round of 16.

== Group A ==
=== Group A table ===
Knockout stage

Team	Matches				Score			Pts
Team	Pld	W	D	L	For	Against	Diff	Pts
Scoil na Tríonóide Naofa	2	2	0	0	31	17	14	4
Christian Brothers College	2	1	0	1	39	28	13	2
Coláiste Íosaef	2	0	0	2	23	48	-25	0

=== Group A results ===
12 October 2016 Round 1	Christian Brothers College, Cork	4-17 - 1-13	Coláiste Íosaef	Mallow GAA Complex
	J Corkery (1-4, 2 frees); J Twomey, D McBarron (1-3 each); T O’Connell (0-5, 3 frees); M Walsh (1-1); B Keohane (0-1).	Report	P O’Riordan (0-8, 5 frees); C McCarthy (0-3, 1 free, 1 65); G Barry (1-1); P Treacy (0-1).

26 October 2016 Round 2	Scoil na Tríonóide Naofa	1-16 - 1-04	Coláiste Íosaef	Bruff Grounds
		Report

16 November 2016 Round 3	Christian Brothers College, Cork	0-10 - 0-12	Scoil na Tríonóide Naofa	Dr Mannix Sportsfield
		Report

== Group B ==
=== Group B table ===
Knockout stage

Team	Matches				Score			Pts
Team	Pld	W	D	L	For	Against	Diff	Pts
Thurles CBS	2	2	0	0	66	24	42	4
De La Salle College	2	0	1	1	27	42	15	1
Gaelcholáiste Mhuire AG	2	0	1	1	29	56	-27	1

=== Group B results ===
12 October 2016 Round 1	Thurles CBS	3-17 - 1-08	De La Salle College Waterford	Clonmel GAA Ground
	D Woods (1-5, 0-5 frees), A McKelvey (1-5), C Bowe (1-2); C Bourke (0-2), S Ryan (0-1); B O’Mara (0-1), O Quirke (0-1).	Report	T Doughlas (1-1, 1-0 penalty, 0-1 free), H Redmond (0-4 frees), C Wadding (0-2).

26 October 2016 Round 2	Gaelcholáiste Mhuire AG	0-13 - 5-25	Thurles CBS	Páirc Mac Gearailt
	C Hanafin 0-8, E Galvin 0-2, E Sheehan 0-2, D Connery 0-1, C Moynihan 0-1.	Report	D Woods 2-13, C Burke 1-2, A McKelvey 1-1, B O'Mara 0-4, TJ Butler 1-0, E Barry 0-2 C Bowe 0-1, M Nally 0-1.

11 November 2016 Round 3	De La Salle College Waterford	1-13 - 2-10	Gaelcholáiste Mhuire AG	Fraher Field
	H Ruddle-Redmond 0-9, T Douglas 1-1, D Walsh 0-2, R Croke 0-1.		S Ó Riagáin 1-2, E Ó Néill 1-0, C Ó hAinifin 0-3, E Ó Síocháin 0-2, D Ó Conaire 0-1, E Ó Gealbháin 0-1.

== Group C ==
=== Group C table ===
Knockout stage

Team	Matches				Score			Pts
Team	Pld	W	D	L	For	Against	Diff	Pts
Blackwater CS	2	2	0	0	48	27	21	4
Castletroy College	2	1	0	1	33	39	-6	2
CBS High School Clonmel	2	0	0	2	27	42	-15	0

=== Group C results ===
24 October 2016 Round 1	Castletroy College	3-08 - 1-13	CBS High School Clonmel	Seán Treacy Park
	R Reale (2-1), M O’Dwyer (0-5, 0-3 frees); D Cullimore (1-0), J Hickey (0-1), C Nicholas (0-1).	Report	S Martin (1-2), M Stokes (0-5 frees); B Owens (0-4), D Bolger (0-1), N Hoctor (0-1).

16 November 2016 Round 2	CBS High School Clonmel	0-11 - 5-10	Blackwater Community School	Goatenbridge Grounds
		Report

23 November 2016 Round 3	Blackwater Community School	2-17 - 1-13	Castletroy College	Seán Treacy Park
		Report

== Group D ==
=== Group D table ===
Knockout stage

Team	Matches				Score			Pts
Team	Pld	W	D	L	For	Against	Diff	Pts
Ardscoil Rís	1	1	0	0	23	8	15	2
Hamilton High School	1	0	0	1	8	23	-15	0

=== Group D result ===
16 November 2016 Round 1	Ardscoil Rís	2-17 - 1-05	Hamilton High School	Mallow GAA Complex
	B Ryan (2-2, 0-1 65m, 0-1 free), W Henn (0-1 free) and R Duff (0-4 each), C O’Reilly (0-3), D Carroll (0-2 frees), J Gleeson and J Daly (0-1 each).	Report	B Butler (1-1, 0-1 free), C Maguire (0-2), P Wall and R McCarthy (0-1 each).

== Group E ==
=== Group E table ===
Knockout stage

Team	Matches				Score			Pts
Team	Pld	W	D	L	For	Against	Diff	Pts
St Colman's College	1	1	0	0	21	17	4	2
Midleton CBS	1	0	0	1	17	21	-4	0

=== Group E result ===
26 October 2016 Round 1	St Colman's College	2-15 - 1-14	Midleton CBS	Church Road
	J Sheehan (2-4, 0-4 frees); N O’Leary (0-5, 0-3 frees, 0-1 ‘65); B Murphy (0-2); S O’Connor, B Roche, A Creed, D Lenihan (0-1 each).	Report	L O’Shea (1-3, 0-1 free); L Gosnell (0-6, 0-4 frees); C Terry (0-2); P O’Brien, S O’Meara, J Stack (0-1 each).

== Group F ==
=== Group F table ===
Knockout stage

Team	Matches				Score			Pts
Team	Pld	W	D	L	For	Against	Diff	Pts
Our Lady's SS	1	1	0	0	26	15	11	2
St Flannan's College	1	0	0	1	15	26	-11	0

=== Group F result ===
25 October 2016 Round 1	Our Lady's Secondary School	1-23 - 1-12	St Flannan's College	MacDonagh Park
	L Fairbrother (0-9, 0-6 frees), J Kelly (0-5), B McGrath (0-5, 0-1 65), A Ormond (1-0), P Cadell (0-2), J Gilmartin (0-2).	Report	T O’Rourke (0-6 frees), G Cahill (1-1); S Meaney (0-2), C Haugh (0-1), R Hayes (0-1 free), S Kennedy (0-1).

== Group G ==
=== Group G table ===
Knockout stage

Team	Matches				Score			Pts
Team	Pld	W	D	L	For	Against	Diff	Pts
St Francis College	1	1	0	0	17	13	4	2
Charleville CBS	1	0	0	1	13	17	-4	0

=== Group G result ===
26 October 2016 Round 1	St Francis College	1-14 - 1-10	Charleville CBS	Mallow GAA Complex
	J O'Sullivan 1-8, B Turnbull 0-2, J Holland 0-1, C Russell 0-1, C Denn 0-1, B O'Connor 0-1.		C O'Brien 1-7, T Connolly 0-1, N Cronin 0-1, T Foley 0-1.

== Group H ==
=== Group H table ===
Knockout stage

Team	Matches				Score			Pts
Team	Pld	W	D	L	For	Against	Diff	Pts
Nenagh CBS	1	1	0	0	25	22	3	2
Abbey CBS	1	0	0	1	22	25	-3	0

=== Group H result ===
25 October 2016 Round 1	Nenagh CBS	1-22 - 2-16 (aet)	Abbey CBS	Lacken Park
		Report

== Knockout stage ==
=== Round of 16 ===
30 November 2016 Round of 16	Our Lady's Secondary School	6-27 - 0-03	Hamilton High School	Ballyagran Grounds
	R McCormack 3-1, B McGrath 0-6 (0-4f. 0-1 ’65) S Doyle 1-2, S Nolan 0-5 (0-2f) A Ormonde 1-2, G O’Connor 1-2, D Ryan 0-3, L Fairbrother 0-2, J Morrissey 0-2, J Kelly 0-1, D O’Shea 0-1	Report	B Butler 0-2 (0-1f) E Buckley 0-1

30 November 2016 Round of 16	Ardscoil Rís	4-16 - 1-07	Charleville CBS	FitzGerald Park
	D Woulfe (2-0), D Carroll (1-3), B Ryan (1-2, 0-1 65m, 0-1 free), R Duff (0-4), J McInerney and J Gleeson (0-2 each), C O’Reilly, W Henn and R McCarthy (0-1 each).	Report	C O’Brien (0-6 frees), J Doyle (1-1)

30 November 2016 Round of 16	Nenagh CBS	1-20 - 1-13	Castletroy College	Lacken Park
	J Morris (0-8, 0-4 frees, 0-3 ‘65s), C McCarthy (1-1), B McLoughney (0-4, 0-3 frees), R Maher (0-2), J Cahill (0-1), S Kirwan (0-1), B Seymour (0-1), M Daniels (0-1, 0-1 frees), C Morgan (0-1).	Report	M O’Dwyer (0-12, 0-12 frees), D Coughlan (1-0), C Nicholas (0-1).

30 November 2016 Round of 16	De La Salle College Waterford	1-18 - 0-16 (aet)	Blackwater Community School	Busky Park
	H Ruddle-Redmond 0-11, K Hennessy 1-0, D Walsh 0-3, T Douglas 0-3, R Croke 0-1.	Report	T Barron 0-11, F Reaney 0-2, G Fives 0-1, D Buckley 0-1, L O'Brien 0-1.

30 November 2016 Round of 16	Christian Brothers College, Cork	3-18 - 3-12	St Francis College	Church Road
	T O’Connell (1-8, 4 frees, 1 65), R Downey (1-3), D Hanlon (1-2), M Walsh, C McNamara (0-2 each), J Twomey (0-1).	Report	J O’Sullivan (1-5, 1-0 penalty, 4 frees, 1 65), B Turnbull (1-2), J Holland (1-1), D Ward (0-2), M McAuliffe, S Kennefick (0-1 each).

30 November 2016 Round of 16	Midleton CBS	1-15 - 1-12	Scoil na Tríonóide Naofa	Dr Mannix Sportsfield
	L Gosnell (0-9, 0-4 frees), G Millerick (1-1), J Stack (0-2), L O’Shea (0-2, 0-1 sideline cut), C Terry (0-1).	Report	W Barry (0-6 frees), B Murphy (1-0), R Renehan (0-2 frees), J Ryan (B) (0-1), M O’Brien (0-1), B Purcell (0-1), G Ryan (0-1).

7 December 2016 Round of 16	St Colman's College	4-22 - 2-19 (aet)	St Flannan's College	FitzGerald Park
	D Lenihan (1-10, 1-9 frees); B Roche (1-5); B Murphy (2-1); J Sheehan (0-2); A Creed, J Mehigan, E Carey, C Cronin (0-1 each).	Report	T O’Rourke (1-11, 0-9 frees); R Hayes (0-4, 0-4 frees); S Meaney (1-1); G Cahill (0-2), S Kennedy (0-1).

14 December 2016 Round of 16	Thurles CBS	0-14 - 0-09	Abbey CBS	Dundrum Grounds
	D Woods (0-10, 0-7 frees), B O’Mara (0-1), A McKelvey (0-1), TJ Butler (0-1), D Flood (0-1).	Report	R Doody (0-7, 0-7 frees), N Murphy-Crowe (0-1), A McGrath (0-1).

=== Quarter-finals ===
11 January 2017 Quarter-final	St Colman's College	3-12 - 1-12	Christian Brothers College, Cork	Church Road
	B Murphy 1-3, B Roche 1-2, D Lenihan 0-4 (frees), J Sheehan 0-3, C Ryan 1-0.	Report	T O’Connell 0-5 (frees), D O’Hanlon 0-4, E Moloney 1-0, J Twomey, D McBarron, J Corkery 0-1 each.

11 January 2017 Quarter-final	Ardscoil Rís	1-15 - 2-12 (aet)	Midleton CBS	Canon Hayes Park
	B Ryan (0-7, 0-5 frees); J Daly (1-0); P O’Brien (0-2 frees), J McInerney (0-2 each); D Carroll (0-1 sc), D Ryan, R Considine, W Henn (0-1 each).	Report	L Gosnell (1-9, 0-6 frees, 0-1 ’65); J Stack (1-0); B Twomey, G Millerick, B Twomey (0-1 each).

11 January 2017 Quarter-final	Nenagh CBS	0-20 - 2-13 (aet)	De La Salle College Waterford	Leahy Park
	J Morris 0-6 (5fs); M Daniels 0-5 (4fs); J Cahill, B McLoughney, B Seymour 0-2 each; K McCarthy, E Power, R Maher 0-1 each.	Report	T Douglas 2-4; H Ruddle Redmond (2fs), D Walsh 0-3 each; C Giles Doran, C Wadding, C Power 0-1 each.

11 January 2017 Quarter-final	Our Lady's Secondary School	3-14 - 1-10	Thurles CBS	The Ragg
	R McCormack 2-0, B McGrath 0-5 (3f), D O’Shea 1-1, J Kelly 0-3, L Fairbrother 0-2, S Nolan, A O’Meara & A Ormonde 0-1 each.	Report	D Woods 0-10 (6f, 1 65, 1 sl), O Quirke 1-0.

19 January 2017 Quarter-final replay	Ardscoil Rís	0-15 - 2-11	Midleton CBS	Canon Hayes Park
	B Ryan (0-7, 0-5 frees, 0-1 free); D Woulfe (0-3); W Henn, J Daly, P O’Brien, R Considine, J McInerney (0-1 each).	Report	L Gosnell (1-5, 0-4 frees); L O’Shea (1-4, 1-0 pen, 0-2 frees); C Terry (0-2).

=== Semi-finals ===
28 January 2017 Semi-final	St Colman's College	1-08 - 0-07	Midleton CBS	Mallow GAA Complex
	D Lenihan (0-3, 0-2 frees, 0-1 ’65); B Roche (1-0); B Murphy (0-2); S O’Connor, D Lardner, R Galvin (0-1 each).	Report	L O’Shea (0-5, 0-2 frees); L Gosnell (0-2 frees).

28 January 2017 Semi-final	Our Lady's Secondary School	1-15 - 0-14	Nenagh CBS	St Michael's Park
	B McGrath (0-6, 5f), A Ormonde (1-2), S Nolan (0-3), J Kelly (0-2), N Quinlan (0-1), L Fairbrother (0-1).	Report	M Daniels (0-4, 3f), R Maher (0-2), J Morris (0-2, 1f), J Cahill (0-2), B Seymour (0-1), C Kelly (0-1), K McCarthy (0-1), B Hogan (0-1, 1f).

=== Final ===
18 February 2017 Final	Our Lady's Secondary School	2-22 - 1-06	St Colman's College	Gaelic Grounds
	B McGrath 1-7 (0-2f, 0-2 65s), J Kelly 0-5, S Nolan 0-4, A Ormonde 1-1, L Fairbrother 0-4 (3f), D O’Shea 0-1.	Report	N O’Leary 1-1, D Lenihan 0-3 (2f), E Roche & D Lardner 0-1 each.	Referee: R McGann (Clare)

== Statistics ==
=== Top scorers ===
Rank	Player	County	Tally	Total	Matches	Average
1	Darragh Woods	Thurles CBS	3-38	47	4	11.75
2	Liam Gosnell	Midleton CBS	2-31	37	5	7.40
3	Brian McGrath	Our Lady's SS	1-29	32	5	6.40
4	Brian Ryan	Ardscoil Rís	3-18	27	4	6.75
4	Harry Ruddle-Redmond	De La Salle College	0-27	27	4	6.75
