= 2021 Tipperary Senior Hurling Championship =

Annual hurling competition season

- Dates: 27 August - 14 November 2021
- Teams: 16
- Sponsor: FBD Insurance
- Champions: Loughmore–Castleiney (4th title); Noel McGrath (captain); Frankie McGrath (manager)
- Runners-up: Thurles Sarsfields; Denis Maher (captain); Mark Dowling (manager)
- Relegated: Roscrea

Tournament statistics
- Matches played: 34
- Goals scored: 94 (2.76 per match)
- Points scored: 1263 (37.15 per match)
- Top scorer(s): John McGrath (7-72)

The 2021 Tipperary Senior Hurling Championship was the 130th staging of the Tipperary Senior Hurling Championship since its establishment by the Tipperary County Board in 1887. The championship began on 27 August 2021 and is scheduled to end on 28 November 2021.

Kiladangan entered the championship as the defending champions, however, they were beaten by Thurles Sarsfields at the semi-final stage.

The championship was won for the fourth time by Loughmore–Castleiney after a replay in the final against Thurles Sarsfields.

== Team changes ==
=== To Championship ===
Promoted from the Séamus Ó Riain Cup

- Mullinahone

=== From Championship ===
Relegated to the Séamus Ó Riain Cup

- Burgess

== Group stage ==
Advance to quarter-finals Advance to relegation semi-final

=== Group 1 ===
| Team | Matches | | | | Score | | | Pts |
| Team | Pld | W | D | L | For | Against | Diff | Pts |
|---|---|---|---|---|---|---|---|---|
| Thurles Sarsfields | 3 | 3 | 0 | 0 | 10-73 | 3-56 | +38 | 6 |
| Upperchurch–Drombane | 3 | 1 | 0 | 2 | 4-51 | 4-59 | -8 | 2 |
| Drom & Inch | 3 | 1 | 0 | 2 | 4-55 | 9-49 | -9 | 2 |
| Éire Óg Annacarty | 3 | 1 | 0 | 2 | 2-47 | 4-62 | -21 | 2 |

==== Results ====
| 28 August 2021 Round 1 | Thurles Sarsfields | 5-19 - 1-23 | Drom & Inch | Semple Stadium |
| 16.30 | P Creedon 3-3, A McCormack 0-7, D Maher 1-1, S Butler 1-1, C Stakelum 0-2, P Bourke 0-2, R Maher 0-2, J Derby 0-1. | | S Callanan 0-11, D Collins 1-2, J Ryan 0-4, R Long 0-3, J Campion 0-1, P Campion 0-1, D Butler 0-1. | Referee: P Carroll |

| 28 August 2021 Round 1 | Upperchurch–Drombane | 0-17 - 0-18 | Éire Óg Annacarty | Pairc Ciocaim |
| 18:30 | P Greene 0-6, P Ryan 0-4, A Ryan 0-3, D Grant 0-1, C Ryan 0-1, L Shanahan 0-1, J Butler 0-1 | Report | A Griffin 0-7, D Mooney 0-3, S Ryan 0-3, P Bradshaw 0-2, B Fox 0-1. | Referee: P Ryan |

| 11 September 2021 Round 2 | Drom & Inch | 1-17 - 3-14 | Upperchurch–Drombane | Semple Stadium |
| 15.30 | S Callanan 0-6, J Ryan 0-6, D Collins 1-1, F Purcell 0-1, R Long 0-1, J Campion 0-1, T Cahill 0-1. | | P Greene 2-7, P Shanahan 1-0, P Ryan 0-2, J Butler 0-2, J Barry 0-1, C Ryan 0-1 | Referee: J Dooley |

| 12 September 2021 Round 2 | Thurles Sarsfields | 2-30 - 1-13 | Éire Óg Annacarty | Pairc Ciocaim |
| 18.00 | A McCormack 0-8, P Creedon 1-3, P Bourke 1-3, C Stakelum 0-4, D Corbett 0-3, S Cahill 0-2, R Maher 0-2, D Maher 0-2, S Butler 0-1, M Cahill 0-1, E Purcell 0-1. | | T Fox 1-4, A Griffin 0-6, D O'Dwyer 0-2, S Ryan 0-1. | Referee: K Delahunty |

| 25 September 2021 Round 3 | Thurles Sarsfields | 3-24 - 1-20 | Upperchurch–Drombane | Páirc Shíleáin |
| 17.00 | A McCormack 0-14, P Bourke 1-1, D Stakeleum 1-1, C Stakelum 1-0, R Maher 0-3, P Creedon 0-3, S Butler 0-1, D Maher 0-1. | | Paul Ryan 0-11, P Greene 1-3, P Shanahan 0-1, J Barry 0-1, N Grant 0-1, A Ryan 0-1, D Grant 0-1, L Shanahan 0-1. | Referee: S Everard |

| 25 September 2021 Round 3 | Drom & Inch | 2-15 - 1-16 | Éire Óg Annacarty | Leahy Park |
| 17.00 | J Ryan 0-9, M Fitzpatrick 1-1, T Cahill 1-0, D Collins 0-2, S Callanan 0-2, R Long 0-1. | | D O'Dwyer 0-5, T Fox 1-1, D Mooney 0-4, A Griffin 0-3, C Mooney 0-1, S Ryan 0-1. | Referee: S Lonergan |

=== Group 2 ===
| Team | Matches | | | | Score | | | Pts |
| Team | Pld | W | D | L | For | Against | Diff | Pts |
|---|---|---|---|---|---|---|---|---|
| Mullinahone | 3 | 2 | 0 | 1 | 4-59 | 3-54 | +8 | 4 |
| Clonoulty–Rossmore | 3 | 2 | 0 | 1 | 2-62 | 5-46 | +7 | 4 |
| Toomevara | 3 | 2 | 0 | 1 | 4-50 | 5-54 | -7 | 4 |
| Holycross–Ballycahill | 3 | 0 | 0 | 3 | 7-46 | 4-63 | -8 | 0 |

==== Results ====
| 28 August 2021 Round 1 | Toomevara | 2-20 - 2-15 | Holycross–Ballycahill | Semple Stadium |
| 13:00 | D Young 1-0, D Delaney 1-0, P Ryan 0-3, C Canning 0-3, J Delaney 0-3, M McCarthy 0-3, J McCarthy 0-2, C O'Meara 0-2, R Quirke 0-1, J Ryan 0-1, W Coffey 0-1 | Report | D Woods 0-4, A Stakelum 1-0, M Nally 1-0, C Barrett 0-3, S Flanagan 0-3, P Russell 0-2, S Ryan 0-1, M Doyle 0-1, J Caesar 0-1. | Referee: K Delahunty |

| 29 August 2021 Round 1 | Mullinahone | 1-15 - 0-24 | Clonoulty–Rossmore | Clonmel Sportsfield |
| 14:00 | E Kelly 0-9, E Keane 1-1, E O'Dwyer 0-2, J Shelly 0-1, M O'Shea 0-1, S Curran 0-1 | | J Ryan 0-8, T Hammersley 0-4, C Hammersley 0-3, D Quirke 0-3, M Ryan 0-2, S Ferncombe 0-2, J O'Keeffe 0-1, S Quinn 0-1. | Referee: K Jordan |

| 11 September 2021 Round 2 | Holycross–Ballycahill | 2-17 - 1-21 | Mullinahone | Moycarkey |
| 14:30 | S Woods 1-8, C Barrett 0-4, M Doyle 0-2, L O'Mara 0-2, P Russell 0-1. | Report | M O'Shea 1-5, E Kelly 0-7, E Keane 0-3, K Bolger 0-2, M Dunne 0-1, S Curran 0-1, E Fennelly 0-1, J Shelly 0-1 | Referee: J McCormack |

| 12 September 2021 Round 2 | Toomevara | 1-17 - 1-16 | Clonoulty–Rossmore | Semple Stadium |
| 13:30 | M McCarthy 0-11, J Delaney 1-1, D Delaney 0-2, A Ryan 0-2, S Nolan 0-1. | | J Ryan 1-9, M Ryan 0-2, R Heffernan 0-1, C Hammersley 0-1, T Hammersley 0-1, D Quirke 0-1, J Hammersley 0-1. | Referee: K Jordan |

| 25 September 2021 Round 3 | Clonoulty–Rossmore | 1-22 - 3-14 | Holycross–Ballycahill | Boherlahan |
| 13:30 | T Hammersley 0-9, S Ferncombe 1-2, M Ryan 0-5, J O'Keeffe 0-2, S O'Connor 0-1, T Butler 0-1, D Quirke 0-1, J Ryan 0-1. | Report | D Woods 1-6, D Fogarty 1-1, L O'Mara 1-0, C Barrett 0-2, S Flanagan 0-2, J Ryan 0-2, P Russell 0-1. | Referee: M Kennedy |

| 25 September 2021 Round 3 | Mullinahone | 2-23 - 1-13 | Toomevara | Semple Stadium |
| 13:30 | J Shelly 2-5, E Kelly 0-8, M O'Shea 0-3, S Curran 0-2, M Kehoe 0-2, E Fennelly 0-1, E Keane 0-1, K Bolger 0-1. | | M McCarthy 0-7 D Young 1-3, J Ryan 0-1, D Delaney 0-1, A Ryan 0-1. | Referee: J Dooley |

=== Group 3 ===
| Team | Matches | | | | Score | | | Pts |
| Team | Pld | W | D | L | For | Against | Diff | Pts |
|---|---|---|---|---|---|---|---|---|
| Kiladangan | 3 | 3 | 0 | 0 | 3-62 | 4-54 | +5 | 6 |
| Loughmore–Castleiney | 3 | 2 | 0 | 1 | 3-69 | 6-53 | +7 | 4 |
| JK Brackens | 3 | 1 | 0 | 2 | 3-50 | 2-57 | -4 | 2 |
| Moycarkey–Borris | 3 | 0 | 0 | 3 | 5-41 | 2-58 | -9 | 0 |

==== Results ====
| 27 August 2021 Round 1 | Kiladangan | 2-23 - 2-22 | Loughmore–Castleiney | Semple Stadium |
| 19:00 | B Seymour 0-9, S Hayes 1-2, A Flynn 0-5, T Gallagher 0-4, D O'Meara 1-0, P Flynn 0-2, D Sweeney 0-1 | Report | J McGrath 0-10, E Connolly 1-1, C McCormack 1-0, L Treacy 0-3, C McGrath 0-2, B McGrath 0-2, T Maher 0-2, A McGrath 0-1, C Connolly 0-1 | Referee: J McCormack |

| 28 August 2021 Round 1 | JK Brackens | 1-16 - 1-13 | Moycarkey–Borris | St. Michael's Park |
| 18:30 | S Doyle 0-6, D McEnroe 1-1, A Ormonde 0-2, L Fairbrother 0-2, E McBride 0-2, P Cadell 0-1, C Cadell 0-1, S Bourke 0-1. | | K Morris 0-9, J Morrissey 1-0, J Bergin 0-1, M Hackett 0-1, N Heffernan 0-1, K Shelly 0-1. | Referee: J Dooley |

| 12 September 2021 Round 2 | Kiladangan | 1-23 - 1-21 | JK Brackens | MacDonagh Park |
| 17:30 | B Seymour 0-10, P Flynn 1-2, D O'Meara 1-1, J Gallagher 0-3, S Hayes 0-3, D McGrath 0-1, D Flannery 0-1, W Connors 0-1, T Gallagher 0-1. | | L Fairbrother 0-11, S Doyle 1-4, A Ormond 0-2, P Cadell 0-1, C Cadell 0-1, S Bourke 0-1, C Scully 0-1. | Referee: S Lonergan |

| 12 September 2021 Round 2 | Loughmore–Castleiney | 1-26 - 3-17 | Moycarkey–Borris | St. Michael's Park |
| 18:30 | J McGrath 1-9, N McGrath 0-5, E Sweeney 0-4, B McGrath 0-2, A McGrath 0-1, E Connolly 0-1, Conor McGrath 0-1, Ciaran McGrath 0-1, C Connolly 0-1. | Report | R Shelley 1-3, K Morris 0-5, K Cummins 1-1, A McKelvey 1-0, M Hackett 0-2, JJ Darmody 0-1, N Heffernan 0-1, P Molloy 0-1, K O'Regan 0-1, K Shelley 0-1, J Morrissey 0-1. | Referee: C Doyle |

| 24 September 2021 Round 3 | Loughmore–Castleiney | 0-21 - 1-13 | JK Brackens | Semple Stadium |
| 19:30 | J McGrath 0-10, B McGrath 0-3, E Sweeney 0-2, N McGrath 0-2, L McGrath 0-2, L Treacy 0-1, C Connolly 0-1. | Report | S Doyle 1-3, L Fairbrother 0-4, A Ormond 0-3, S Bourke 0-2, P Cadell 0-1. | Referee: P Carroll |

| 26 September 2021 Round 3 | Kiladangan | 0-16 - 1-11 | Moycarkey–Borris | Páirc Shíleáin |
| 15:00 | B McLoughney 0-5, B Seymour 0-3, J Gallagher 0-2, T Gallagher 0-2, P Flynn 0-2, W Connors 0-1, D Moran 0-1. | | C Morris 0-5, A McKelvey 1-0, J Fallon 0-2, P Molloy 0-1, D Flood 0-1, K O'Regan 0-1, K Cummins 0-1. | Referee: J McCormack |

=== Group 4 ===
| Team | Matches | | | | Score | | | Pts |
| Team | Pld | W | D | L | For | Against | Diff | Pts |
|---|---|---|---|---|---|---|---|---|
| Kilruane MacDonaghs | 3 | 3 | 0 | 0 | 6-69 | 6-60 | +9 | 6 |
| Borris–Ileigh | 3 | 2 | 0 | 1 | 5-61 | 2-48 | +22 | 4 |
| Nenagh Éire Óg | 3 | 1 | 0 | 2 | 4-52 | 2-68 | -10 | 2 |
| Roscrea | 3 | 0 | 0 | 3 | 2-59 | 7-65 | -21 | 0 |

==== Results ====
| 28 August 2021 Round 1 | Borris–Ileigh | 2-24 - 0-15 | Roscrea | St. Flannan's Park |
| 17:00 | E Ryan 0-9, JD Devaney 1-2, B Maher 0-5, K Maher 1-1, C Kenny 0-3, R McCormack 0-2, N Kenny 0-1 | Report | L Cashin 0-4, J Fitzpatrick 0-4, E Fitzpatrick 0-2, C Sheedy 0-2, A Tynan 0-1, S Conlon 0-1, L Seacy 0-1. | Referee: A Tierney |

| 29 August 2021 Round 1 | Nenagh Éire Óg | 2-21 - 1-26 | Kilruane MacDonaghs | Toomevara |
| 13:00 | M Heffernan 1-6, P Morris 1-4, J Morris 0-6, T Heffernan 0-4, A Walsh 0-1 | Report | K O'Kelly 1-6, C Darcy 0-5, W Cleary 0-4, J Cahill 0-4, T Cleary 0-2, S McAdams 0-1, N O'Meara 0-1, S Hennessy 0-1, M O'Neill 0-1, P Williams 0-1 | Referee: C Doyle |

| 10 September 2021 Round 2 | Borris–Ileigh | 2-21 - 2-24 | Kilruane MacDonaghs | Semple Stadium |
| 19:30 | E Ryan 0-11, J Kelly 1-3, JD Devaney 1-0, C Kenny 0-5, B Maher 0-2 | Report | W Cleary 1-6, S Hennessy 1-4, T Cleary 0-5, M O'Neill 0-3, K O'Kelly 0-3, C Morgan 0-1, J Cahill 0-1, J Cleary 0-1 | Referee: M Kennedy |

| 11 September 2021 Round 2 | Roscrea | 0-26 - 2-22 | Nenagh Éire Óg | Toomevara |
| 17:30 | E Fitzpatrick 0-7, A Tynan 0-5, L Cashin 0-5, C Sheedy 0-3, S Fletcher 0-2, C Phelan 0-1, D Tynan 0-1, S Conlon 0-1, J Fitzpatrick 0-1. | Report | M Heffernan 0-11, T Heffernan 1-2, J Morris 0-4, P Hickey 1-0, K Malone 0-1, A Walsh 0-1, P Morris 0-1, P Murphy 0-1, A Healy 0-1. | Referee: P Carroll |

| 26 September 2021 Round 3 | Borris–Ileigh | 1-16 - 0-09 | Nenagh Éire Óg | Semple Stadium |
| 15:45 (broadcast live on TG4) | E Ryan 0-9, N Kenny 1-1, C Kenny 0-4, J Kelly 0-1, B Maher 0-1. | Report | J Morris 0-3, M Heffernan 0-2, B Heffernan 0-2, J Mackey 0-1, K Malone 0-1. | Referee: K Jordan |

| 26 September 2021 Round 3 | Kilruane MacDonaghs | 3-19 - 2-18 | Roscrea | Toomevara GAA Grounds |
| 17:00 | W Cleary 0-9, S Hennessy 1-1, T Cleary 1-1, T Hogan 1-0, J Cahill 0-3, S McAdams 0-2, C Morgan 0-1, Eanna Hogan 0-1, Eoin Hogan 0-1. | | A Tynan 1-5, L Cashin 0-8, S Fletcher 1-1, D Ryan 0-3, D Tynan 0-1, J Fitzpatrick 0-1. | Referee: J Lillis |

== Relegation ==
=== Semi-finals ===
| 9 October 2021 Semi-Final | Eire Og Annacarty | 2-26 - 2-22 | Holycross–Ballycahill | Clonoulty |
| 15.00 | | Report |

| 10 October 2021 Semi-Final | Moycarkey–Borris | 2-20 - 1-19 | Roscrea | Páirc Shíleáin |
| 14.00 |

=== Final ===
| 23 October 2021 Final | Holycross–Ballycahill | 1-15 - 0-12 | Roscrea | Templetuohy |
| 14.00 | | Report |

== Knockout stage ==
=== Bracket ===
Preliminary Quarter-Final; 8 October 2021
Loughmore–Castleiney | 2-21
Killenaule | 0-12

Quarter-Finals; 15, 16, 17 October 2021
Mullinahone | 2-19
Borris–Ileigh | 1-24
Kilruane MacDonaghs | 0-21
Loughmore–Castleiney | 4-15
Thurles Sarsfields | 2-19
Clonoulty–Rossmore | 1-14
Kiladangan | 1-21
Upperchurch–Drombane | 0-13

Semi-Finals; 30 & 31 October 2021
Borris–Ileigh | 1-15
Loughmore–Castleiney | 1-18
Thurles Sarsfields | 1-19
Kiladangan | 2-14

Final; 14 November 2021
Loughmore–Castleiney | 0-23; 2-14 (R)
Thurles Sarsfields | 2-17; 2-13 (R)

=== Preliminary quarter-final ===
| 8 October 2021 Preliminary quarter-final | Killenaule | 0-12 - 2-21 | Loughmore–Castleiney | Semple Stadium |
| 19:30 | C O Dwyer 0-6, J O’ Dwyer 0-2, E Shaw 0-2, D Fitzgerald 0-1, M Stakelum -0-1 | Report | J McGrath 1-6, N McGrath 1-2, L Treacy 0-3, E Connolly 0-3, E Sweeney 0-2, L McGrath 0-2, Conor McGrath 0-1, T Maher 0-1 |

=== Quarter-finals ===
| 15 October 2021 Quarter-Final | Mullinahone | 2-19 - 1-24 (aet) | Borris–Ileigh | Semple Stadium |
| 19.30 | E Kelly 0-11, J Shelly 1-2, M Kehoe 1-2, K Bolger 0-1, S Curran 0-1, E O'Dwyer 0-1, M Dunne 0-1 | Report | E Ryan 0-10, N Kenny 1-1, Kieran Maher 0-3, J Kelly 0-2, C Kenny 0-2, J Devaney 0-2, R McCormack 0-1, B Maher 0-1, T Fahy 0-1, Kevin Maher 0-1 |

| 16 October 2021 Quarter-Final | Thurles Sarsfields | 2-19 - 1-14 | Clonoulty–Rossmore | Semple Stadium |
| 15.00 (broadcast live on RTÉ2) | A McCormack (0-9, 7 frees); P Bourke (0-1 free); R Maher (1-0 pen, 0-1 sideline) (1-2 each); S Cahill (0-3); D Maher, D Stakelum, C Stakelum (0-1 each). | Report | T Hammersley (0-9, 6 frees); Jack Ryan (1-2, 1-0 free); T Butler, D Quirke, C Hammersley (0-1 each). |

| 16 October 2021 Quarter-Final | Kilruane MacDonaghs | 0-21 - 4-15 | Loughmore–Castleiney | Semple Stadium |
| 17.00 (broadcast live on RTÉ2) | W. Cleary 0-10, T. Cleary 0-2, M. O'Neill 0-1, A. Morgan 0-1, C. Cleary 0-1, C. Morgan 0-1, N. O'Meara 0-1 | Report | J. McGrath 4-6, N. McGrath 0-3, L. McGrath 0-2, E Connolly 0-2, C. Connolly 0-1, L. Treacy 0-1 |

| 17 October 2021 Quarter-Final | Kiladangan | 1-21 - 0-13 | Upperchurch–Drombane | Semple Stadium |
| 14.00 | B Seymour (1-7, 0-7fs), B McLoughney (0-4), S Hayes (0-3), P Flynn (0-2), W Connors, A Flynn, D McGrath, T Gallagher, J Gallagher (0-1 each). | Report | P Greene (0-6, 3fs), P Ryan (0-3, 1f), A Ryan (0-2), G Ryan, L Shanahan (0-1 each). | Referee: M Kennedy |

=== Semi-finals ===
| 30 October 2021 Semi-Final | Kiladangan | 2-14 - 1-19 | Thurles Sarsfields | Semple Stadium |
| | B McLoughney (1-3), B Seymour (1-2), P Flynn (0-4), J Gallagher (0-3), W Connors (0-2) | Report | A McCormack (0-6), P Creedon (0-5), C Stakelum (1-2), P Bourke (0-2), R Maher (0-1), D Stakelum (0-1), D Maher (0-1), S Cahill (0-1) |

| 31 October 2021 Semi-Final | Loughmore–Castleiney | 1-18 - 1-15 | Borris–Ileigh | Semple Stadium |
| | J McGrath (1-12), E Sweeney (0-1), L Treacy (0-1), C Connolly (0-1), N McGrath (0-1), T McGrath (0-1), L McGrath (0-1) | Report | E Ryan (0-6), J Devaney (1-2), Kieran Maher (0-2), C Kenny (0-2), J Kelly (0-2), B Maher (0-1) |

=== Final ===
| 14 November 2021 Final | Thurles Sarsfields | 2-17 - 0-23 | Loughmore–Castleiney | Semple Stadium |
| 15.15 (broadcast live on TG4) | D Maher (2-1), A McCormack (0-6), P Bourke (0-5), D Stakelum (0-1), Paul Maher (0-1), P Creedon (0-1), C Stakelum (0-1), R Maher (0-1) | Report | J McGrath (0-12), N McGrath (0-3), L McGrath (0-3), C Connolly (0-2), A McGrath (0-1), E Sweeney (0-1), Ciaran McGrath (0-1) | Referee: Conor Doyle |

| 28 November 2021 Final Replay | Thurles Sarsfields | 2-13 - 2-14 | Loughmore–Castleiney | Semple Stadium |
| 15.15 (broadcast live on TG4) | D Maher (1-2), P Bourke (0-4), D Stakelum (1-0), A McCormack (0-3, 3f), R Maher (0-2, 1f), D Corbett (0-1), S Butler (0-1) | Report | J McGrath (0-7, 5f), B McGrath (1-0), L McGrath (1-0), N McGrath (0-2), J Meagher (0-1), C Connolly (0-1), T McGrath (0-1), E Sweeney (0-1), C McCormack (0-1) | Attendance: 4,215; Referee: John McCormack |

== Championship statistics ==
=== Top scorers ===
Overall

| Rank | Player | Club | Tally | Total | Matches | Average |
|---|---|---|---|---|---|---|
| 1 | John McGrath | Loughmore–Castleiney | 7-72 | 93 | 8 | 11.63 |
| 2 | Aidan McCormack | Thurles Sarsfields | 0-53 | 53 | 7 | 7.57 |
| 3 | Eddie Ryan | Borris–Ileigh | 0-45 | 45 | 5 | 9.00 |
| 4 | Billy Seymour | Kiladangan | 2-31 | 37 | 5 | 7.40 |
| 5 | Eoin Kelly | Mullinahone | 0-35 | 35 | 4 | 8.75 |
| 6 | Willie Cleary | Kilruane MacDonaghs | 1-29 | 32 | 4 | 8.00 |
| 7 | Paudie Greene | Upperchurch–Drombane | 3-22 | 31 | 4 | 7.75 |
| 8 | Pa Bourke | Thurles Sarsfields | 3-19 | 28 | 7 | 4.00 |
| 9 | Paddy Creedon | Thurles Sarsfields | 4-15 | 27 | 7 | 3.86 |
| 10 | Jack Ryan | Clonoulty–Rossmore | 2-20 | 26 | 4 | 6.5 |

In a single game

| Rank | Player | Club | Tally | Total | Opposition |
|---|---|---|---|---|---|
| 1 | John McGrath | Loughmore–Castleiney | 4-06 | 18 | Kilruane MacDonaghs |
| 2 | John McGrath | Loughmore–Castleiney | 1-12 | 15 | Borris-Ileigh |
| 3 | Aidan McCormack | Thurles Sarsfields | 0-14 | 14 | Upperchurch–Drombane |
| 4 | Paudie Greene | Upperchurch–Drombane | 2-07 | 13 | Drom & Inch |
| 5 | Paddy Creedon | Thurles Sarsfields | 3-03 | 12 | Drom & Inch |
| 5 | Jack Ryan | Clonoulty–Rossmore | 1-09 | 12 | Toomevara |
| 5 | John McGrath | Loughmore–Castleiney | 1-09 | 12 | Moycarkey-Borris |
| 5 | John McGrath | Loughmore–Castleiney | 0-12 | 12 | Thurles Sarsfields |
| 9 | Jack Shelly | Mullinahone | 2-05 | 11 | Toomevara |
| 9 | Dara Woods | Holycross–Ballycahill | 1-08 | 11 | Mullinahone |
| 9 | Séamus Callanan | Drom & Inch | 0-11 | 11 | Thurles Sarsfields |
| 9 | Mark McCarthy | Toomevara | 0-11 | 11 | Clonoulty–Rossmore |
| 9 | Lyndon Fairbrother | J. K. Brackens | 0-11 | 11 | Kiladangan |
| 9 | Eddie Ryan | Borris–Ileigh | 0-11 | 11 | Kilruane MacDonaghs |
| 9 | Michael Heffernan | Nenagh Éire | 0-11 | 11 | Roscrea |
| 9 | Paul Ryan | Upperchurch–Drombane | 0-11 | 11 | Thurles Sarsfields |
| 9 | Eoin Kelly | Mullinahone | 0-11 | 11 | Borris-Ileigh |

== Championship statistics ==
=== Miscellaneous ===
- Loughmore–Castleiney won their first title since 2013.
- Loughmore–Castleiney won the double for the second time in their history.
