= Micheál Webster =

Irish hurler and Gaelic footballer

Personal information
- Native name: Mícheál (Irish)
- Born: Loughmore, County Tipperary, Ireland
- Occupation: Facilities Manager
- Height: 6 ft 4 in (193 cm)

Sport
- Football Position: Right wing-forward
- Hurling Position: Full-forward
Club
- Years: Club
- Loughmore–Castleiney
Club titles
	Football	Hurling
Tipperary titles	2	2
Munster titles	0	1
Inter-county
- Years: County
- 2005-2010 2003-2005: Tipperary (hurling); Tipperary (football)
Inter-county titles
	Football	Hurling
Munster Titles	0	2
All-Ireland Titles	0	0
League titles	0	1
All-Stars	0	0

Micheál Webster is an Irish hurler and Gaelic footballer who played as a full-forward for the Tipperary senior team.

Webster made his first appearance for the Tipperary senior football team during the 2003 National League and was a regular dual player until his retirement after the 2009 hurling championship. During that time he won 2 Munster, 1 National League hurling & 1 Railway Cup medals. He has ended up as an All-Ireland runner-up on one occasion in 2009.

At club level Webster is a dual county senior championship medalist with Loughmore–Castleiney.

== Playing career ==
=== Club ===
Webster plays his club hurling and football with Loughmore–Castleiney GAA.

In 2004 he was captain of the Loughmore senior football team that won the county championship decider. Moyle Rovers were the opponents, however, a 0–9 to 0–6 victory gave Webster a county football championship medal.

Three years later 2007 Webster was on the Loughmore–Castleiney team that reached the county hurling championship final. Drom & Inch provided the opposition, however, the game was one-sided in nature. A 0–22 to 0–13 victory gave Webster a county hurling championship medal. Loughmore–Castleiney later reached the provincial final against Tulla. In bad weather Loughmore–Castleiney emerged as winners by 1–6 to 0-7 giving Webster a Munster medal.

=== Inter-county ===
Webster first came to prominence on the inter-count scene as a member of the Tipperary junior football team during the 2002 campaign.

The following year Webster joined the Tipp senior football team. He made his debut as a substitute in a National League game against Waterford and was used on a regular basis during the rest of the campaign.

In 2004 he made his championship debut with the Tipperary senior football team in a defeat by Limerick.

By 2005 Webster had joined the Tipperary senior hurling team. He made his debut in a National League game against Down that year, and immediately became a regular member of the team.

After losing back-to-back Munster finals to Cork in 2005 and 2006 and a disastrous season in 2007, things began to change for Tipp in 2009. Tipperary qualified for the Munster final that year where they defeated Clare by 2–21 to 0–19. Webster collected his first Munster medal that day, however, Tipperary were subsequently defeated in an All-Ireland semi-final by Waterford on a scoreline of 1–20 to 1–18. Cummins was once again presented with an All-Star award.

In 2009 Webster won his second Munster medal as Tipp defeated Waterford by 4–14 to 2–16. After a six-week lay-off and a semi-final win over Limerick, Tipperary qualified for an All-Ireland final meeting with Kilkenny. Two quick goals in the space of a minute, one from a penalty by Henry Shefflin, meant a 2–22 to 0–23 defeat for Tipperary.
