= Brian McGrath (hurler) =

Irish hurler

Personal information
- Native name: Brian Mac Craith (Irish)
- Born: 1998 (age 27–28) Loughmore, County Tipperary, Ireland

Sport
- Sport: Hurling
- Position: Full-back
Club
- Years: Club
- Loughmore–Castleiney
Club titles
	Football	Hurling
Tipperary titles	4	3
College
- Years: College
- University of Limerick
Inter-county*
Years	County	Apps (scores)
2019–	Tipperary	4 (0-02)
Inter-county titles
- Munster titles: 0
- All-Irelands: 2
- NHL: 0
- All Stars: 0
- *Inter County team apps and scores correct as of 18:12, 12 March 2019.

Brian McGrath (born 1998) is an Irish hurler who plays for Tipperary Senior Championship club Loughmore–Castleiney and at inter-county level with the Tipperary senior hurling team. He usually lines out as a full-back.

== Personal life ==
McGrath is the son of Pat McGrath who won an All-Ireland medal with Tipperary in 1989. His brothers, Noel and John, are also All-Ireland medal-winners and current teammates on the Tipperary senior team.

== Career ==
McGrath made his senior debut for Tipperary on 1 March 2020, in round 4 of the 2020 National Hurling League against Waterford in an 0–24 to 2–16 win.

On 20 July in the 2025 All-Ireland final, he was and unused substitute as Tipperary defeated Cork by 3–27 to 1-19 and claim a 29th All-Ireland title.

== Career statistics ==
=== Club ===
==== Hurling ====
As of match played 5 September 2026

Team	Year	Tipperary		Munster		Total	
Team	Year	Apps	Score	Apps	Score	Apps	Score
Loughmore–Castleiney	2015	3	0-03	—		3	0-03
Loughmore–Castleiney	2016	3	0-02	—		3	0-02
Loughmore–Castleiney	2017	4	0-00	—		4	0-00
Loughmore–Castleiney	2018	5	0-04	—		5	0-04
Loughmore–Castleiney	2019	4	0-01	—		4	0-01
Loughmore–Castleiney	2020	6	0-03	—		6	0-03
Loughmore–Castleiney	2021	7	1-07	1	0-00	8	1-07
Loughmore–Castleiney	2022	4	1-02	—		4	1-02
Loughmore–Castleiney	2023	5	0-00	—		5	0-00
Loughmore–Castleiney	2024	6	0-02	1	0-00	7	0-02
Loughmore–Castleiney	2025	6	0-03	1	0-01	7	0-04
Loughmore–Castleiney	2026	4	0-03	—		4	0-03
Total		57	2-30	3	0-01	60	2-31

==== Football ====
As of match played 18 October 2026

Team	Year	Tipperary		Munster		Total	
Team	Year	Apps	Score	Apps	Score	Apps	Score
Loughmore–Castleiney	2015	4	1-01	—		4	1-01
Loughmore–Castleiney	2016	5	1-06	1	0-00	6	1-06
Loughmore–Castleiney	2017	4	0-02	—		4	0-02
Loughmore–Castleiney	2018	3	0-00	—		3	0-00
Loughmore–Castleiney	2019	5	0-00	—		5	0-00
Loughmore–Castleiney	2020	5	0-00	—		5	0-00
Loughmore–Castleiney	2021	4	0-01	1	0-00	5	0-01
Loughmore–Castleiney	2022	5	0-05	—		5	0-05
Loughmore–Castleiney	2023	4	1-02	—		4	1-02
Loughmore–Castleiney	2024	6	0-03	2	1-00	6	0-03
Loughmore–Castleiney	2025	5	1-02	—		5	1-02
Loughmore–Castleiney	2026	6	2-04	0	0-00	6	2-04
Total		56	6-30	4	1-00	60	7-30

=== Inter-county ===
Team	Year	National League			Munster		All-Ireland		Total	
Team	Year	Division	Apps	Score	Apps	Score	Apps	Score	Apps	Score
Tipperary	2019	Division 1A	0	0-00	0	0-00	0	0-00	0	0-00
Tipperary	2020	Division 1A	1	0-00	0	0-00	0	0-00	1	0-00
Tipperary	2021	Division 1A	4	0-01	0	0-00	0	0-00	4	0-01
Tipperary	2022	Division 1B	2	0-01	1	0-00	—		3	0-01
Tipperary	2023	Division 1B	2	0-01	3	0-02	0	0-00	5	0-03
Tipperary	2024	Division 1B	2	0-00	1	0-00	—		3	0-00
Tipperary	2025	Division 1A	4	0-01	0	0-00	1	0-00	5	0-01
Tipperary	2026	Division 1A	1	0-00	1	0-00	—		2	0-00
Career total			16	0-04	6	0-02	1	0-00	23	0-06

== Honours ==
Our Lady's Secondary School

- Dr Croke Cup (1): 2017
- Dr Harty Cup (1): 2017

Loughmore–Castleiney

- Tipperary Senior Hurling Championship (3): 2021, 2024, 2025
- Tipperary Senior Football Championship (4): 2016, 2021, 2024, 2026 (c)
- Mid Tipperary Senior Hurling Championship (4): 2016, 2018, 2024, 2026
- Mid Tipperary Senior Football Championship (5): 2015, 2016, 2017, 2018, 2023

Tipperary

- All-Ireland Senior Hurling Championship (2): 2019, 2025
- All-Ireland Under-21 Hurling Championship (1): 2018
- All-Ireland Minor Hurling Championship (1): 2016 (c)
- Munster Minor Hurling Championship (2): 2015, 2016 (c)

Sporting positions
Preceded by Stephen Quirke	Tipperary Minor Hurling Captain; 2016	Succeeded by Paddy Cadell
Achievements
Preceded by Seán Loftus	All-Ireland Minor Hurling Final winning captain 2016	Succeeded by Darren Morrissey
