= 2014 Tipperary Senior Football Championship =

Gaelic football competition in Ireland

The 2014 Tipperary Senior Football Championship began in the summer of 2014. Loughmore-Castleiney were the defending champions after winning their 12th title in 2013.

The final in front of a crowd of 1,550 between Loughmore Castleiney and Cahir which was played on 21 December in Cashel and finished in a draw with the replay fixed for 26 December. Cian Hennessy's scored the equalising point for Loughmore in the final minute after Benny Hickey had scored from a free in the 54th minute to put Cahir in front. Cahir had led 1–6 to 2–2 at half time.

Loughmore Castleiney defeated Cahir by 0–9 to 2–2 in the replay on 26 December.

== Teams ==
- Group 1 – Aherlow, Kilsheelan-Kilcash, Galtee Rovers, Fethard
- Group 2 – Clonmel Commercials, Arravale Rovers, Moyne-Templetuohy, Cahir, Clonmel Og
- Group 3 – Loughmore-Castleiney, Thomas MacDonaghs, Ardfinnan, JK Brackens, Ballyporeen
- Group 4 – Moyle Rovers, Eire Og Annacarty, Moycarkey-Borris, Killenaule

== Fixtures ==
Preliminary Quarter-Finals (15/16 November)

- Arravale Rovers 0-13 Ardfinnan 1–6
- Moyle Rovers 0-9 Galtee Rovers/St Pecaun 0–8
- Kilsheelan-Kilcash 0-9 Thomas MacDonagh's 3–8
- JK Brackens 0-8 Éire Óg Annacarty/Donohill 1–13

Quarter-Finals (23/30 November)

- Thomas MacDonaghs 1-9 Killenaule 0–8
- Arravale Rovers 0-9 Loughmore-Castleiney 0–12
- Eire Og Annacarty 0-15 Cahir 3–6
- Replay: Cahir 0-10 Éire Óg Annacarty 0–5
- Aherlow 1-9 Moyle Rovers 0–11

Semi-Finals (14 December)

- Loughmore Castleiney 3-5 Aherlow 0–8
- Thomas MacDonaghs 3-5 Cahir 2–10

Final (21 December, 1:30pm, Cashel)

- Loughmore Castleiney 2-7 Cahir 1-10

Final Replay (26 December, 1:00pm, Cashel)

- Loughmore Castleiney 0-9 Cahir 2-2
