= 2016 Tipperary Senior Football Championship =

Tipperary S.F.C.
- Season: 2016
- Champions: Loughmore-Castleiney; 14th title
- Relegated: Thomas McDonaghs
- Winning Captain: Liam McGrath
- Man of the Match: Cian Hennessy

The 2016 Tipperary Senior Football Championship was the 126th edition of the Tipperary GAA's premier club Gaelic football tournament for senior graded teams in County Tipperary, Ireland. The tournament consisted of 16 teams (15 clubs and 1 divisional side) with the winner going on to represent Tipperary in the Munster Senior Club Football Championship. The championship began with a Group stage before proceeding to a knock-out format.

Clonmel Commercials were the defending champions after they defeated Moyle Rovers in the previous years final, however they relinquished their crown to Loughmore-Castleiney at the Semi-Final stage this season.

This was Upperchurch-Drombanes return to the senior grade after claiming the 2015 Tipperary Intermediate Football Championship title.

Loughmore-Castleiney won the title after a 1-9 to 1-6 win against Moyle Rovers in the final on 30 October. It was their third county senior football title in four years.

Thomas McDonaghs were relegated to the 2017 IFC at the end of the season after conceding a walkover for each of their fixtures.

== Team changes ==
The following teams have changed division since the 2015 championship season.

=== To S.F.C. ===
Promoted from I.F.C.

- Upperchurch-Drombane - (Intermediate Champions)

=== From S.F.C. ===
Relegated to I.F.C.

- Moycarkey-Borris

== Group stage ==
All 16 teams enter the competition at this stage. The top 2 teams in each group go into the Quarter-Finals while the bottom team of each group will enter a Relegation Playoff.

=== Group A ===
Team	Pld	W	L	D	PF	PA	PD	Pts
Moyle Rovers	3	2	1	0	44	28	+16	4
Drom & Inch	3	2	1	0	42	35	+7	4
Aherlow Gaels	3	2	1	0	42	36	+6	4
Ardfinnan	3	0	3	0	26	50	-24	0

Round 1

- Aherlow Gaels 0-10, 0-9 Moyle Rovers, 16/4/2016,
- Drom & Inch 1-12, 0-8 Ardfinnan, 16/4/2016,

Round 2

- Drom & Inch 2-11, 0-12 Aherlow Gaels, 30/4/2016,
- Moyle Rovers 2-11, 1-5 Ardfinnan, 30/4/2016,

Round 3

- Aherlow Gaels 3-9, 1-7 Ardfinnan, 24/8/2016,
- Moyle Rovers 0-15, 0-10 Drom & Inch, 24/8/2016,

Quarter-Final Playoff:

- Aherlow Gaels 1-15, 0-7 Drom & Inch, 5/10/2016,

=== Group B ===
Team	Pld	W	L	D	PF	PA	PD	Pts
Clonmel Commercials	3	3	0	0	54	22	+32	6
Ballyporeen	3	2	1	0	34	23	+11	4
JK Brackens	2	0	2	0	16	27	-11	0
Killenaule	2	0	2	0	15	34	-19	0

Round 1

- Ballyporeen 1-10, 0-10 JK Brackens, 16/4/2016,
- Clonmel Commercials 2-14, 1-6 Killenaule, 16/4/2016,

Round 2

- Clonmel Commercials 0-14, 0-6 JK Brackens, 30/4/2016,
- Ballyporeen 1-11, 0-6 Killenaule, 30/4/2016,

Round 3

- Clonmel Commercials 3-11, 0-7 Ballyporeen, 1/9/2016,
- JK Brackens -vs- Killenaule,

=== Group C ===
Team	Pld	W	L	D	PF	PA	PD	Pts
Loughmore-Castleiney	3	3	0	0	23	13	+10	6
Galtee Rovers	3	2	1	0	22	14	+8	4
Éire Óg Annacarty	3	1	2	0	14	35	-21	2
Thomas MacDonaghs	3	0	3	0	0	0	+0	0

Round 1

- Éire Óg Annacarty w/o, scr Thomas MacDonaghs, 17/4/2016,
- Loughmore-Castleiney 0-7, 0-6 Galtee Rovers, 17/4/2016,

Round 2

- Loughmore-Castleiney w/o, scr Thomas MacDonagh's, 30/4/2016,
- Galtee Rovers 2-10, 0-7 Éire Óg Annacarty, 30/4/2016,

Round 3

- Loughmore-Castleiney 1-16, 0-7 Éire Óg Annacarty, 14/9/2016,
- Galtee Rovers w/o, scr Thomas MacDonagh's, 14/9/2016,

=== Group D ===
Team	Pld	W	L	D	PF	PA	PD	Pts
Arravale Rovers	3	2	0	1	50	37	+13	5
Kilsheelan-Kiilcash	3	2	0	1	52	40	+12	5
Cahir	3	1	2	0	38	48	-10	2
Upperchurch-Drombane	3	0	3	0	35	52	-17	0

Round 1

- Arravale Rovers 1-14, 3-8 Kilsheelan-Kiilcash, 16/4/2016,
- Cahir 2-11, 0-13 Upperchurch-Drombane, 16/4/2016,

Round 2

- Arravale Rovers 1-9, 1-6 Upperchurch-Drombane, 29/4/2016,
- Kilsheelan-Kilcash 1-11, 1-7 Cahir, 1/5/2016,

Round 3

- Arravale Rovers 2-15, 0-11 Cahir, 24/8/2016,
- Kilsheelan-Kilcash 1-18, 1-10 Upperchurch-Drombane, 24/8/2016,

== Knockout stage ==
=== Quarter finals ===
16 October 2016 Quarter Final	Clonmel Commercials	1-19 - 0-11	Arravale Rovers	Cahir
		Report

16 October 2016 Quarter Final	Kilsheelan-Kilcash	1-13 - 0-12	Ballyporeen	Cahir
		Report

16 October 2016 Quarter Final	Loughmore-Castleiney	3-15 - 0-11	Galtee Rovers/Cahir	Cashel
		Report

19 October 2016 Quarter Final	Moyle Rovers	2-11 - 0-13	Aherlow Gaels	Ballyporeen
		Report

=== Semi finals ===
23 October 2016 Semi Final	Loughmore-Castleiney	0-9 - 0-8	Clonmel Commercials	Boherlahan
		Report

23 October 2016 Semi Final	Moyle Rovers	4-14 - 0-6	Kilsheelan-Kilcash	Cahir
14:30		Report

=== Final ===
30 October 2016
2:30pm
Final

Loughmore-Castleiney	1-9 - 1-6	Moyle Rovers
Cian Hennessy 1-2, Liam McGrath 0-2, John McGrath 0-1, Liam Treacy 0-1, Noel McGrath 0-1, Joseph Hennessy 0-1, Aidan McGrath 0-1	Report	Dara Ryan 1-0, Stephen Quirke 0-3 (1 ’45’, 2F), Liam Boland 0-3 (2F).

Leahy Park, Cashel
Attendance: 1,257
Referee: David Grogan (Aherlow)
