= Loughmore–Castleiney GAA =

Gaelic games club in County Tipperary, Ireland

Loughmore–Castleiney
- Luchma–Caisleán Laighnigh
- Founded: 1885
- County: Tipperary
- Colours: Green and Red
- Grounds: Páirc Ó Riain, Cuguilla
- Coordinates: 52°46′15″N 7°47′15″W

Playing kits
Standard colours

Senior Club Championships
	All Ireland	Munster champions	Tipperary champions
Football:	-	-	17
Hurling:	-	1	6
Ladies' football:	–	1	5

Loughmoe Castle [sic] overlooks the club's grounds in Cuguilla and features on the club's crest

Loughmore–Castleiney GAA is a Gaelic Athletic Association club in County Tipperary, Ireland. The club competes in the Mid-Tipperary division of Tipperary GAA, and draws its players and support from the parish of the same name. The area comprises the villages of Loughmore and Castleiney with their surrounding hinterland.

== History ==
Loughmore–Castleiney has traditionally been a Gaelic football club but also has a hurling team, making it one of the very few dual clubs at senior level in County Tipperary.

=== Early years (1884-1940) ===
Although Loughmore–Castleiney GAA club didn't really become an entity until the 1940s, Gaelic games flourished in the parish since the founding of Cumann Luthchleas Gael (CLG) in 1884. Because of the parish's proximity to Thurles, where CLG was founded, clubs in Loughmore and Castleiney were among the first nine clubs formed in Mid Tipperary in 1885, one year after the association's founding. Teams from both Loughmore and Castleiney were among the seven Mid Tipperary teams involved in the first Tipperary Senior Football Championship in 1887. In the Senior football county final of 1895, Loughmore were defeated by Arravale Rovers.

There was no senior football team in the parish again until 1909 when Castleiney were one of three teams to contest the first Mid Football championship, which was won by Thurles. During the next decade teams from both Castleiney and Loughmore fielded in the Senior football championship every year. Castleiney won the 1914 Mid and county Senior football finals. In the same year, they won the first Junior football championship organised by the Mid Tipperary Board. Castleiney–Templetouhy United also won Mid Tipperary titles in 1915 and 1919. Loughmore were united with Templemore during the second half of this decade.

The club provided Jim Ryan and Bill Ryan to the Tipperary GAA team that played in Croke Park on Bloody Sunday against Dublin GAA in November 1920 when their playing colleague Michael Hogan of Grangemockler was one of 15 people shot and killed by British forces who opened fire from the sidelines. Their home grounds are named Páirc Ó Riain in honour of the two men, who also won All-Ireland senior medals with Tipperary.

Apart from Ballyduag, in the first decade of the 20th century, very little competitive hurling appears to have been played in the parish until Castleiney contested the Mid Junior final of 1923. They succeeded in winning the Mid Junior final of 1925. Three years later in 1928 Castleiney–Killea became Mid Senior hurling champions. Denis Mackey played on the Tipperary Junior hurling team that won the Munster final in 1929.

Castleiney won the Mid Junior football final of 1938 but lost the county final to Emly. Promotion to senior ranks in 1939 resulted in a heavy defeat from Templemore Eire Og. Loughmore won the Mid Junior final of 1939 but suffered a similar fate to Castleiney when they lost to Ballingarry in the County final. United for the first time in 1940, Loughmore–Castleiney made parish history by winning the Mid and county senior football titles.

=== Separation and reunification (1941-1969) ===
Although Castleiney and Loughmore amalgamated on a couple of occasions in the 1930s they appear to have been only temporary arrangements. The 1940s was a much more successful period for the now united Castleiney-Loughmore team. The 1940 success was followed in 1946 with county Senior football honours and five divisional senior football titles were also won.

Castleiney and Loughmore went their separate ways during the 1950s. Loughmore contested six consecutive county Senior football finals winning in 1955. In 1959 the parish had two senior football teams for the first time since 1887 as a result of Castleiney’s Junior success in 1958. Loughmore came out on top when they met in the Mid final of 1959 and the Mid semi-final of 1960.

At the 1961 Mid convention a rule was passed that only allowed one hurling and football club in a rural parish. Loughmore and Castleiney have been united since. The reunification did not bring the instant success enjoyed twenty-one years earlier in 1940. It was 1965 before the first Mid Senior football title was won and not until 1973 was the next Senior football county title brought back to the parish.

=== Becoming a dual club (1970-1999) ===
During the 1970s, the club won three Senior football county titles and three U-21 football county titles. Two county minor doubles in 1976 and 1979 were also achieved. The earlier minor/u-21 successes of the 1950s and 1960s had been diluted somewhat by amalgamation with neighbours Moyne–Templetuohy. Juvenile titles both divisional and county were won for the first time. Sean Kearney and Eddie Webster won Railway Cup football medals with Munster in 1974 and 1975. Eddie’s son, Micheál, became the club’s third Railway Cup medal winner thirty years later, this time in hurling.

The 1980s were to prove even more successful; winning the 1980 Intermediate hurling county final gave the club dual senior status which has not been relinquished since. Two Senior football titles, 1983 and 1987, and one Senior hurling, 1988, were won. On two occasions, 1983 and 1987, the elusive double was within a score of being achieved. In 1989, Pat McGrath and John Cormack added Senior All-Ireland hurling medals to their already considerable under-age collection at national level. Peter Brennan and Jim Maher were also All-Ireland hurling medal winners at minor and U-21. Maher in fact captaining the successful Tipperary 1980 minor side.

In the 1990s, a Senior football title in 1992 was the highlight. Ned Ryan brought distinction to the club and parish when he won a Senior hurling All-Ireland medal in 1991.

=== Inter-county success (2000-2012) ===
The new millennium started well with David Kennedy, Paul Ormond and Noel Morris collecting All-Ireland Senior hurling medals in 2001. It was Ormond's second Celtic Cross as he already had a Junior football All-Ireland. The "noughties" (early 2000s) brought two Senior county titles to the parish also; football in 2004 and hurling in 2007. Club history was made in 2007 when the Munster Club hurling championship was won, before losing to Portumna in the All-Ireland Senior Club Hurling Championship semi-final.

Liam McGrath captained the successful All-Ireland minor football team of 2011. John Meagher, John McGrath and Darragh Butler also brought All-Ireland medals to the parish on that occasion. In 2012, it was Eddie Connolly’s turn to bring an All-Ireland cup to the parish – Intermediate hurling on this occasion when Evan Sweeney also collected a medal.

=== County doubles (2013-present) ===
In 2013, Loughmore–Castleiney became the first team to win both the football and hurling Tipperary Senior titles in the same year. Back to back county football titles was another first when the club retained the Senior football county final in 2014. The McGrath brothers brought great honour to the club in 2016 when Noel and John won Senior hurling All-Ireland medals and Brian captained the successful minor team on the first Sunday of September. It was Noel’s second senior medal and both he and John had enjoyed under-age hurling success with Tipperary already. They have also been recognised for All-Star awards.

The Senior football county title was regained in 2016 after defeating Moyle Rovers in the final. In 2017, following a lapse of 39 years, a Junior A football county final was achieved and the Intermediate footballers won a Mid title. In 2018, the Senior footballers won their fourth Mid title in a row with the Senior hurlers also attaining a Mid title. In 2020, a run of success ended by reaching both county finals, losing both finals to Clonmel Commercials in the football by a single point and losing the hurling by two points to Kiladangan.

In 2021, the first piece of silverware came from our Junior C hurlers who won the Mid final beating Gortnahoe–Glengoole on a score line of 1-14 to 0-08. Senior football and hurling championship was played every weekend with hurling one week and football the next. On the 16th successive week, the Senior footballers took the county tile with a one-point win over Clonmel Commercials. Week 17, the county Senior hurling final replay saw a 2-14 to 2-13 victory over Thurles Sarsfields which secured a second county double for Loughmore Castleiney.

== Honours ==
=== Gaelic football ===
==== Senior ====
- Tipperary Senior Football Championship (17)
  - (Castleiney) 1914
  - 1940, 1946, 1955, 1973, 1977, 1979, 1983, 1987, 1992, 2004, 2013, 2014, 2016, 2021, 2024, 2026
- Mid-Tipperary Senior Football Championship (63)
  - (Castleiney) 1914, 1915, 1919
  - 1940, 1941, 1946, 1947, 1948, 1951
  - (Loughmore) 1954, 1955, 1956, 1957, 1958, 1959
  - 1965, 1966, 1967, 1968, 1969, 1970, 1971, 1972, 1973, 1974, 1975, 1976, 1977, 1978, 1979, 1980, 1981, 1982, 1983, 1984, 1985, 1987, 1988, 1989, 1990, 1991, 1992, 1993, 1994, 1995, 1996, 1997, 1998, 1999, 2000, 2003, 2004, 2005, 2007, 2008, 2009, 2010, 2012, 2015, 2016, 2017, 2018, 2023

==== Intermediate ====
- Mid Tipperary Intermediate Football Championship (3)
  - 1978, 1987, 2018

==== Junior ====
- Tipperary Premier Junior Football Championship (1)
  - 2024
- Tipperary Junior A Football Championship (2)
  - 1978, 2017
- Mid Tipperary Junior A Football Championship (22)
  - (Castleiney) 1914, 1938, 1955, 1958, 1959
  - (Loughmore) 1934, 1939, 1960, 1961
  - 1947, 1948, 1949, 1950, 1953, 1962, 1978, 1993, 2003, 2005, 2006, 2011, 2014
- Mid Tipperary Junior B Football Championship (2)
  - 1994, 1997

==== Under-21 ====
- Tipperary Under-21 A Football Championship (10)
  - 1964, 1970, 1974, 1976, 1979, 1997, 2004, 2005, 2006, 2012
- Mid Tipperary Under-21 A Football Championship (28)
  - 1963, 1964, 1965, 1966, 1969, 1970, 1972, 1974, 1976, 1977, 1978, 1979, 1980, 1981, 1990, 1994, 1995, 1996, 1997, 2004, 2005, 2006, 2009, 2010, 2011, 2012, 2013, 2015
- Mid Tipperary Under-21 B Football Championship (2)
  - 1988, 1993

==== Minor ====
- Tipperary Minor A Football Championship (6)
  - (Castleiney) 1956
  - 1964, 1976, 1977, 1979, 2002
- Mid Tipperary Minor A Football Championship (21)
  - (Castleiney) 1955, 1956, 1957
  - 1959, 1964, 1965, 1966, 1972, 1974, 1975, 1976, 1977, 1978, 1979, 1980, 2001, 2002, 2008, 2009, 2010, 2011
- Mid Tipperary Minor B Football Championship (6)
  - 1985, 1989, 1992, 1999, 2006, 2015

=== Hurling ===
==== Senior ====
- Munster Senior Club Hurling Championship (1)
  - 2007
- Tipperary Senior Hurling Championship (6)
  - 1988, 2007, 2013, 2021, 2024, 2025
- Mid Tipperary Senior Hurling Championship (16)
  - (Killea-Castleiney) 1928
  - 1983, 1986, 1987, 1988, 1992, 1994, 1998, 2002, 2003, 2004, 2011, 2016, 2018, 2024, 2026

==== Intermediate ====
- Tipperary Intermediate Hurling Championship (1)
  - 1980
- Mid Tipperary Intermediate Hurling Championship (1)
  - 1980

==== Junior ====
- Mid Tipperary Junior A Hurling Championship (3)
  - (Castleiney) 1925
  - 1940, 2011
- Mid Tipperary Junior B Hurling Championship (1)
  - 1993
- Mid Tipperary Junior C Hurling Championship (4)
  - 2021, 2022, 2023, 2026

==== Under-21 ====
- Tipperary Under-21 A Hurling Championship (2)
  - 2011, 2014
- Mid Tipperary Under-21 A Hurling Championship (6)
  - 1979, 1981, 1982, 2004, 2011, 2014
- Tipperary Under-21 B Hurling Championship (1)
  - 1994
- Mid Tipperary Under-21 B Hurling Championship (3)
  - 1988, 1994, 1998

==== Minor ====
- Tipperary Minor A Hurling Championship (4)
  - 1976, 1979, 2002, 2009
- Mid Tipperary Minor A Hurling Championship (8)
  - 1974, 1976, 1977, 1978, 1979, 2002, 2009, 2011
- Tipperary Minor B Hurling Championship (1)
  - 1993
- Mid Tipperary Minor B Hurling Championship (5)
  - 1993, 1999, 2014, 2015
  - 2026 (with Moyne–Templetuohy)

== Ladies' football ==
The club had a Ladies' football team in the 1970s but folded. The club revived its Ladies' football team in 2022. Women from the parish who wish to play camogie tend to play with neighbouring club Drom & Inch.

=== Honours ===
==== Senior ====
- Munster Senior Club Ladies' Football Championship (1)
  - 1977
- Tipperary Senior Ladies' Football Championship (5)
  - 1975, 1976, 1977, 1978, 1979

==== Junior ====
- Tipperary Junior A Ladies' Football Championship (1)
  - 2023
- Tipperary Junior B Ladies' Football Championship (1)
  - 2022

== Notable players ==
- Eddie Connolly
- John Cormack
- Jim Healy
- David Kennedy
- Brian McGrath
- John McGrath
- Liam McGrath
- Noel McGrath
- Pat McGrath
- Tom McGrath
- John Meagher
- Noel Morris
- Elias O'Keeffe
- Paul Ormond
- Micheál Webster
