= Paddy Cadell =

Irish hurler

Personal information
- Native name: Pádraig Cadal (Irish)
- Born: 1999 (age 26–27) Templemore, County Tipperary, Ireland
- Occupation: Student

Sport
- Sport: Hurling
- Position: Midfield
Club
- Years: Club
- J.K. Bracken's
Club titles
- Limerick titles: 0
College
- Years: College
- University College Cork
College titles
- Fitzgibbon titles: 1
Inter-county*
Years	County	Apps (scores)
2019-present	Tipperary	3 (0-00)
Inter-county titles
- Munster titles: 0
- All-Irelands: 1
- NHL: 0
- All Stars: 0
- *Inter County team apps and scores correct as of 16:43, 25 January 2020.

Patrick Cadell (born 1999) is an Irish hurler who plays for Tipperary Senior Championship club J.K. Bracken's and at inter-county level with the Tipperary senior hurling team. He usually lines out at midfield.

== Career ==
Cadell made his senior debut for Tipperary on 25 January 2020 in the opening round of the 2020 National Hurling League against Limerick in a 0–18 to 2–14 defeat.

He made his championship debut on 1 November 2020, coming on as a substitute in the second half of the 2–17 to 3-23 Munster semi-final defeat to Limerick.

On 12 February 2023, Cadell went off injured in the league match against Kilkenny and suffered a pivot shift injury to his left knee and missed the rest of the 2023 season.

== Honours ==
Our Lady's Secondary School

- Dr. Croke Cup (1): 2017 (c)
- Dr. Harty Cup (1): 2017 (c)

University College Cork

- Fitzgibbon Cup (1): 2020

J.K. Bracken's

- Séamus Ó Riain Cup (1): 2019

Tipperary

- All-Ireland Senior Hurling Championship (1): 2019
- All-Ireland Under-21 Hurling Championship (1): 2018
- All-Ireland Under-20 Hurling Championship (1): 2019
- Munster Under-20 Hurling Championship (1): 2019
- All-Ireland Minor Hurling Championship (1): 2016
- Munster Minor Hurling Championship (1):2016
