= Jim Healy (Gaelic footballer) =

Irish Gaelic footballer

Personal information
- Native name: Séamus Ó hÉilí (Irish)
- Born: 1952 (age 73–74) Loughmore, County Tipperary, Ireland

Sport
- Sport: Gaelic football
Club
- Years: Club
- Loughmore–Castleiney
Inter-county
- Years: County
- 1970-1971: Tipperary
Inter-county titles
- Munster titles: 0
- All-Irelands: 0
- NFL: 0
- All Stars: 0

James Healy (born 1952) is an Irish retired Gaelic footballer who played for the Tipperary senior team.

Born in Loughmore, County Tipperary, Healy first arrived on the inter-county scene at the age of seventeen when he first linked up with the Tipperary minor team before later joining the junior side. He joined the senior panel during the 1970 championship.

At club level Healy played with Loughmore–Castleiney.

Healy retired from inter-county football following the conclusion of the 1971 championship.

In retirement from playing Healy became involved in team management and coaching. He has served as a selector with the Tipperary minor, under-21, junior and senior teams.

== Honours ==
=== Selector ===
Tipperary

- Tommy Murphy Cup (1): 2005
