= Jim Healy (sports commentator) =

American sports anchor (1923–1994)

James Patrick Healy (September 14, 1923 – July 22, 1994) was a longtime Los Angeles, California, sports commentator (KLAC, 1961–1965; KFWB, 1969; KABC-TV, 1969–1984; KLAC, 1973–1982; KMPC, 1984–1994), whose daily solo radio show featured a number of sound effects and audio clips ("drops") of famous sports personalities, which he played repeatedly to affect an acerbically humorous tone.

Healy wrote for KMPC sportcaster Bob Kelley for 11 years, and hosted "Here's Healy" on KBIG and also worked at KFWB, KABC-TV and KLAC.

Healy's shows (from the late 1970s onward) took the form of him reading headlines, with the clicking sound effect of a teleprinter in the background. In response to his own headlines or comments, Healy would then play one of his many favorite audio clips, such as "That's a bunch of bull," "That's just plain poppycock" (President Richard Nixon), or "Jim Healy, you've got a weak show" (by a Howard Cosell mimic), followed by the genuine Cosell drop "Who Goofed I've got to know." and "Jim Healy that's your lowest shot ever!" Among his sound effects was a high pitched smirking laughtrack, sounding like, "Mee-hee-hee-hee..." (Norm Sherry, then manager of the California Angels).

Perhaps the most notorious—and among the most frequently played—clip in Healy's collection was a post-game tirade by then-Los Angeles Dodgers manager Tommy Lasorda, after Dave Kingman, playing for the Chicago Cubs, hit three home runs to beat the Dodgers. Lasorda's rant started out: "What's my opinion of Kingman's performance!? What the &@*$% do you think is my opinion of it?"

Among other Healy-isms:

- He used the term "zops" as slang for dollars.
- He referred to fellow L.A. sports broadcasting personality Stu Nahan (both appeared in "Rocky III") as "Silver-tipped Stu."
- He called Bill Dwyre, sports editor of the Los Angeles Times, "Journalist Bill."
- Ever dismissive of his arch-rivals, UCLA alum Healy referred to the USC Trojans as the "Brain Surgeons." He also flashed a distorted recording of the Trojan Fight Song with the fanfare melting down into a slow sludge prefacing USC news "datelines"...
- He called Chick Hearn, the late announcer for the Los Angeles Lakers, "Chickieburger."
- Chris Schenkel, who actually died in 2005, eleven years after Healy, was always "the late Chris Schenkel".

His KMPC show was famous for going over its 30-minute time limit. Healy would stay on the air as the top of the hour approached, then warn his listeners about the impending "dreaded six o'clock tone", and continue his program.

During his late career, one of Healy's favorite clips came from then-University of Miami defensive end Jerome Brown, captured on tape when Brown led his fellow Hurricanes out of a pre-1987 Fiesta Bowl dinner with opponent Penn State, saying: Did the Japanese go and sit down and have dinner with Pearl Harbor before they bombed 'em? Any reference to Japan or the Japanese on Healy's show would result in a replay of Brown's remark. When Brown died in a car accident on June 25, 1992, Healy announced Brown's death during his 5:30 p.m. PDT broadcast — and never played the "Pearl Harbor" clip again.

== Death ==
Healy died July 22, 1994, at age 70 from complications of liver cancer. He was survived by his wife and son, Patrick, a newscaster on KNBC-TV in Los Angeles.

== HWOF ==
Jim Healy has a Star on the Hollywood Walk of Fame at 6740 Hollywood Blvd.
