= Mark Kehoe =

Irish hurler

Personal information
- Native name: Marc Mac Eochaidh (Irish)
- Born: 9 September 1998 (age 28) Kilsheelan, County Tipperary, Ireland
- Occupation: Student

Sport
- Sport: Hurling
- Position: Full-forward
Club
- Years: Club
- Kilsheelan–Kilcash
Club titles
- Tipperary titles: 0
College
- Years: College
- University College Cork
College titles
- Fitzgibbon titles: 2
Inter-county*
Years	County	Apps (scores)
2018-present	Tipperary	24 (8-23)
Inter-county titles
- Munster titles: 0
- All-Irelands: 1
- NHL: 0
- All Stars: 0
- *Inter County team apps and scores correct as of match played 26 May 2024.

Mark Kehoe (born 9 September 1998) is an Irish hurler who plays for club side Kilsheelan–Kilcash and at inter-county level with the Tipperary senior hurling team. He is usually deployed as a full-forward, but can also be deployed as a corner-forward.

== Career ==
On 17 June 2023, he scored a hat-trick and ended up with a total of 3–3 against Offaly in an All-Ireland preliminary quarter-final.

== Career statistics ==
As of match played 26 May 2024

Team	Year	National League		Munster		All-Ireland		Total	
Team	Year	Apps	Score	Apps	Score	Apps	Score	Apps	Score
Tipperary	2019	4	0-02	3	0-00	3	0-02	10	0-04
Tipperary	2020	3	0-05	1	0-00	1	0-00	5	0-05
Tipperary	2021	3	1-02	1	1-00	1	0-01	5	2-03
Tipperary	2022	4	2-11	4	2-02	-		8	4-13
Tipperary	2023	6	1-07	4	1-09	2	3-03	12	5-19
Tipperary	2024	3	2-04	4	1-06	-		7	3-10
Total		23	6-31	17	5-17	7	3-06	47	14-54

== Honours ==
University College Cork

- Fitzgibbon Cup (2): 2019, 2020

Tipperary

- All-Ireland Senior Hurling Championship (1): 2019
- All-Ireland Under-21 Hurling Championship (1): 2018
- All-Ireland Minor Hurling Championship (1): 2016
- Munster Minor Hurling Championship (1): 2016
