= Kilsheelan–Kilcash GAA =

Gaelic games club in County Tipperary, Ireland

- Cill Síoláin–Cill Cais
- Founded: 1924
- County: Tipperary
- Colours: Blue and gold
- Grounds: Kilsheelan-Kilcash GAA Grounds, Kilsheelan
- Coordinates: 52.363401°N 7.583729°W

Playing kits
Standard colours

Kilsheelan–Kilcash GAA is a Gaelic Athletic Association club located in the village of Kilsheelan in South County Tipperary, Ireland. The club competes in fixtures organised by the South Tipperary divisional board and Tipperary county board.

== Achievements ==
- Tipperary Senior Football Championship Winners (4) 1930, 1933, 1968, 1972 | Runners-Up 1989, 1902, 1905, 1906, 1981
- South Tipperary Senior Football Championship Winners (6) 1930, 1933, 1970, 1983, 2014, 2015 | Runners-Up 1979, 2013
- Tipperary Intermediate Football Championship Winners (1) 2010
- South Tipperary Intermediate Football Championship Winners (5) 1993, 1994, 2003, 2006, 2010
- South Tipperary Intermediate Hurling Championship Winners (6) 1967, 1970, 1981, 1984, 1997, 2015, 2022, 2023
- South Tipperary Junior Football Championship Winners (5) 1924, 1925, 1942, 1950, 1964
- South Tipperary Junior B Football Championship Winners (3) 1992, 1996, 2000
- Tipperary Junior A Hurling Championship Winners (1) 2012
- South Tipperary Junior A Hurling Championship Winners (5) 1957, 1964, 1980, 2011, 2012
- Tipperary Under-21 B Football Championship Winners (2) 2003, 2019
- South Tipperary Under-21 B Football Championship Winners (2) 2003, 2019
- South Tipperary Under-21 A Hurling Championship Winners (1) 2014
- South Tipperary Under-21 B Hurling Championship Winners (1) 2024
- South Tipperary Under-19 B Football Championship Winners (1) 2023
- Tipperary Under-19 B Football Championship Winners (1) 2023
- South Tipperary Minor Football Championship Winners (1) 1946
- Tipperary Minor B Football Championship Winners (2) 2010, 2014
- South Tipperary Minor B Football Championship Winners (3) 2010, 2014, 2016
- South Tipperary Minor C Football Championship Winners (1) 1996
- South Tipperary Minor B Hurling Championship Winners (1) 1998

== Notable players ==
- Evan Comerford
- Mark Kehoe
- Tom Larkin
- Bill Maher
- Paul Maher
- David Power, managed Tipperary to the 2020 Munster Senior Football Championship title
- Séamus Roche (referee)
