= 2022 Tipperary Senior Football Championship =

County Gaelic Games competition

- Dates: 30 July 2022 - 16 October 2022
- Teams: 16
- Sponsor: FBD Insurance
- Champions: Clonmel Commercials (20th title); Jamie Peters (captain); Tommy Morrissey (manager)
- Runners-up: Upperchurch–Drombane; Ailbe O'Donoghue (captain); Eoin Shortt (manager)
- Relegated: Aherlow

Tournament statistics
- Matches played: 29
- Goals scored: 56 (1.93 per match)
- Points scored: 640 (22.07 per match)
- Top scorer(s): Paul Shanahan (3-23)

The 2022 Tipperary Senior Football Championship was the 132nd staging of the Tipperary Senior Football Championship since its establishment by the Tipperary County Board in 1887. The championship started on 30 July and ended on 16 October.

Loughmore–Castleiney were the defending champions, but lost to Upperchurch–Drombane at the semi-final stage.

Clonmel Commercials won their 20th title after a 1-10 to 1-2 win against first time finalists Upperchurch–Drombane in the final on 16 October.

== Team changes ==
=== To Championship ===
Promoted from the Tipperary Intermediate Football Championship

- Drom & Inch

=== From Championship ===
Relegated to the Tipperary Premier Intermediate Hurling Championship

- Moyne–Templetuohy

== Group stage ==
Advance to quarter-finals Advance to relegation semi-final

=== Group 1 ===
Team	Matches				Score			Pts
Team	Pld	W	D	L	For	Against	Diff	Pts
Clonmel Commercials	3	3	0	0	5-47	0-30	+32	6
Upperchurch–Drombane	3	2	0	1	2-33	3-28	+2	4
Killenaule	3	1	0	2	2-31	3-34	-6	2
Cahir	3	0	0	3	2-28	5-47	-28	0

==== Results ====
30 July 2022 Round 1	Cahir	1-8 - 1-12	Upperchurch–Drombane	Pairc Ciocaim Dundrum
19.00	J Buckley (0-4, 4f), G Quinn (0-3, 2f), C Condon (1-0), S O'Connor (0-1)	Report	P Shanahan (1-5, 4f), L Shanahan (0-4, 3f), G Grant (0-1), A Ryan (0-1), J Butler (0-1)	Referee: M Doyle

30 July 2022 Round 1	Clonmel Commercials	1-14 - 0-9	Killenaule	Fethard
19.00	S O'Connor (1-5, 1f), Conal Kennedy (0-3), K Fahey (0-1), C Deely (0-1), J Kennedy (0-1), A Matassa (0-1), C Smith (0-1), Colman Kennedy (0-1)	Report	M Doyle (0-5, 5f), Joe O'Dwyer (0-2, 2f), P Feehan (0-1), John O'Dwyer (0-1)	Referee: J Cullen

12 August 2022 Round 2	Clonmel Commercials	2-11 - 0-9	Upperchurch–Drombane	Golden
19.00	S O'Connor (1-2), J Lonergan (0-3), Conal Kennedy (1-0), Colman Kennedy (0-2), J Morris (0-1), J Kennedy (0-1), A Matassa (0-1), C Smith (0-1)	Report	P Shanahan (0-7), L Ryan (0-1), A O'Donoghue (0-1)	Referee: D Grogan

14 August 2022 Round 2	Cahir	1-8 - 2-13	Killenaule	Fethard
14.30	S O'Connor (1-1), J Buckley (0-3, 1m), G Quinn (0-3), I Flannery (0-1)	Report	Joe O'Dwyer (1-4, 3f), M Doyle (0-6, 4f), J O'Dwyer (1-0), E Shaw (0-2), J Gleeson (0-1)	Referee: B Tyrell

28 August 2022 Round 3	Killenaule	0-9 - 1-12	Upperchurch–Drombane	Littleton
14.30	John O'Dwyer (0-4), Joe O'Dwyer (0-1), J Gleeson (0-1), O Shaw (0-1), D Fitzgerald (0-1), M Heffernan (0-1)	Report	P Shanahan (1-4), L Shanahan (0-6), A O'Donoghue (0-1), A Ryan (0-1)	Referee: P Russell

28 August 2022 Round 3	Cahir	0-12 - 2-22	Clonmel Commercials	Leahy Park Cashel
14.30	J Buckley (0-7, 6f), G Hally (0-2), N McKenna (0-2), E Heffernan (0-1)	Report	J Kennedy (1-6, 1f, 1 '45), S O'Connor (0-7, 4f), M O'Reilly (1-0), K Fahey (0-3), A Matassa (0-3), J Peters (0-1), C Smith (0-1), P McGarry (0-1)	Referee: M Doyle

=== Group 2 ===
Team	Matches				Score			Pts
Team	Pld	W	D	L	For	Against	Diff	Pts
Moyle Rovers	3	3	0	0	2-27	2-14	+13	6
Kilsheelan–Kilcash	3	2	0	1	5-35	2-39	+5	4
Rockwell Rovers	3	1	0	2	4-31	1-39	+1	2
Drom & Inch	3	0	0	3	0-25	6-26	-19	0

==== Results ====
31 July 2022 Round 1	Rockwell Rovers	3-11 - 0-14	Drom & Inch	Boherlahan
12.00	A Moloney (1-5, 2f), TJ Ryan (1-3, 1f), A Barron (1-0), L Fahey (0-1), G Ryan (0-1), T Tobin (0-1)	Report	T Nolan (0-4, 1f), D Butler (0-3), R Long (0-2), P Mullen (0-2), D Kennedy (0-1), J Lillis (0-1), P Campion (0-1)	Referee: S Everard

31 July 2022 Round 1	Moyle Rovers	2-14 - 1-8	Kilsheelan–Kilcash	Clonmel Sportfield
13.00	Liam Boland (0-6, 2f, 1 45'), S Foley (1-2), S Quirke (0-4), D Foley (1-0), C McKeown (0-1), R Collins (0-1)	Report	J Roche (0-5, 3f), B Murphy (1-1), P Maher (0-1), B Kehoe (0-1, 1f)	Referee: D O'Mahoney

13 August 2022 Round 2	Moyle Rovers	0-13 - 1-6	Rockwell Rovers	Cahir
15.30	Liam Boland (0-8, 6f), D Owens (0-2), C McKeown (0-1), S Foley (0-1), S Cotter (0-1)	Report	A Moloney (0-4, 4f), T Tobin (1-0), L Fahey (0-1), J Lawrence (0-1)	Referee: D O'Mahoney

13 August 2022 Round 2	Drom & Inch	0-11 - 3-15	Kilsheelan–Kilcash	Leahy Park Cashel
19.00	D Butler (0-7), R Long (0-1), J Ryan (0-1), J Moloney (0-1), T Nolan (0-1)	Report	B Kehoe (0-6), M Stokes (1-1), P Maher (1-1), B Maher (1-0), M Kehoe (0-3), E Comerford (0-1, 1 45'), J Roche (0-1), C Kelly (0-1), C Neville (0-1)	Referee: S Lonergan

27 August 2022 Round 3	Kilsheelan–Kilcash	1-12 - 0-14	Rockwell Rovers	Clonmel Sportfield
18.30	M Kehoe (1-4), E Comerford (0-3), B Kehoe (0-2), S Freaney (0-2), M Stokes (0-1)		A Moloney (0-7), TJ Ryan (0-5), T Tobin (0-1), P Halley (0-1)	Referee: D Grogan

27 August 2022 Round 3	Drom & Inch	conc - w/o	Moyle Rovers
18.30

=== Group 3 ===
Team	Matches				Score			Pts
Team	Pld	W	D	L	For	Against	Diff	Pts
Loughmore–Castleiney	3	3	0	0	6-41	2-24	+29	6
Ardfinnan	3	1	1	1	2-41	3-33	+5	3
Moycarkey–Borris	3	1	0	2	3-29	5-41	-18	2
Aherlow	3	0	1	2	5-23	6-36	-16	1

==== Results ====
30 July 2022 Round 1	Loughmore–Castleiney	0-12 - 0-7	Ardfinnan	Leahy Park Cashel
19.00	C Ryan (0-5, 2f), B McGrath (0-3), E Connolly (0-1), L McGrath (0-1), N McGrath (0-1), Conor McGrath (0-1)	Report	B Hewitt (0-2, 1f), J Mahoney (0-2), R Condon (0-1), G Whelan (0-1), M Barlow (0-1)	Referee: P Russell

30 July 2022 Round 1	Aherlow	1-5 - 2-9	Moycarkey–Borris	Boherlahan
19.00	M Elligot (1-1), B Grogan (0-2, 2f), D Looby (0-1), S Moloney (0-1)	Report	K Shelly (0-4, 3f), M Foley (1-0), L Carney (1-0), J Fallon (0-1), K Cummins (0-1), P Molloy (0-1), D Flood (0-1), C McCullagh (0-1)	Referee: P Ivors

12 August 2022 Round 2	Loughmore–Castleiney	3-14 - 0-8	Moycarkey–Borris	Templetuohy
19.00	C Ryan (2-5, 2f), L McGrath (1-3, 1m), S O'Connell (0-1), B McGrath (0-1), N McGrath (0-1), T McGrath (0-1), Conor McGrath (0-1), D McCahey (0-1)	Report	K Shelly (0-6, 6f), T Ryan (0-1), M Foley (0-1)	Referee: J Leahy

14 August 2022 Round 2	Aherlow	2-9 - 1-12	Ardfinnan	Bansha
14.30	B Grogan (1-3), D Looby (1-2), S Moloney (0-1), B Carey (0-1), M Elligot (0-1), T Hanley (0-1)		M Barlow (1-4), B Hewitt (0-3, 3f), L O'Brien (0-2), C O'Shaughnessy (0-1), J O'Mahoney (0-1), G Whelan (0-1)	Referee: J Butler

27 August 2022 Round 3	Aherlow	2-9 - 3-15	Loughmore–Castleiney	Leahy Park Cashel
18.30	T Hanley (1-6, 2f, 1m), T Carew (1-0), D Neville (0-1), L Coskeran (0-1), L Carew (0-1)	Report	Ciaran McGrath (2-0), L Egan (1-0), J Ryan (0-3), A McGrath (0-2), C Hennessy (0-2), T McGrath (0-2), C Ryan (0-2, 1f), Conor McGrath (0-2), B McGrath (0-1), N McGrath (0-1)	Referee: D Horan

27 August 2022 Round 3	Ardfinnan	1-22 - 1-12	Moycarkey–Borris	Golden
18.30	G Whelan (1-4), B Hewitt (0-5, 1f), M Barlow (0-5, 1f), L O'Brien (0-2), A Browne (0-2), C O'Shaughnessy (0-1), D O'Leary (0-1), J Coffey (0-1), C O'Gorman (0-1)	Report	R Shelley (1-5, 3f), R Ryan (0-2), K Shelley (0-2), T Ryan (0-1), P Molloy (0-1), D Maher (0-1)	Referee: S Lonergan (M)

=== Group 4 ===
Team	Matches				Score			Pts
Team	Pld	W	D	L	For	Against	Diff	Pts
JK Brackens	3	3	0	0	1-22	1-17	+5	6
Arravale Rovers	3	2	0	1	5-29	2-30	+8	4
Ballyporeen	3	1	0	2	4-31	4-35	-4	2
Éire Óg Annacarty	3	0	0	3	0-20	3-20	-9	0

==== Results ====
30 July 2022 Round 1	Arravale Rovers	0-7 - 0-9	JK Brackens	Pairc Ciocaim Dundrum
19.00	J Hogan (0-5, 2f), D Leahy (0-1), T Byrnes (0-1)	Report	J Kennedy (0-6, 4f), D O'Shea (0-1), C Cadell (0-1), K Beban (0-1, 1f)	Referee: D Grogan

31 July 2022 Round 1	Ballyporeen	1-11 - 0-9	Éire Óg Annacarty	Cahir
12.30	C Sweeney (0-8, 5f), D Finn (1-0), D Lyons (0-2), D Brennan (0-1)	Report	D Crosse (0-3, 2f), C Devlin (0-2), P Devlin (0-2), C Mooney (0-1), K Fox (0-1, 1f)	Referee: B Tyrell

13 August 2022 Round 2	Arravale Rovers	2-9 - 0-11	Éire Óg Annacarty	Pairc Ciocaim Dundrum
19.00	C Maher (0-5, 3f), S Leahy (1-0), D Leahy (1-0), C Molloy (0-2), J Hogan (0-1, 1f), C Donovan (0-1)		D Crosse (0-5, 3f), C Bradshaw (0-3), D O'Dwyer (0-2), P Bradshaw (0-1)	Referee: J Cullen

14 August 2022 Round 2	Ballyporeen	1-10 - 1-13	JK Brackens	Leahy Park Cashel
14.30	C Sweeney (0-8, 6f), F O'Sullivan (1-0), T Vaughan (0-1), C English (0-1)	Report	C Cadell (1-1), D McEnroe (0-4), J Kennedy (0-4), S Doyle (0-2), N Quinlan (0-1), S Bourke (0-1)	Referee: T Loughnane

28 August 2022 Round 3	Éire Óg Annacarty	conc - w/o	JK Brackens	New Inn
16.00

28 August 2022 Round 3	Arravale Rovers	3-13 - 2-10	Ballyporeen	Bansha
16.00	D Leahy (2-2), C Hickey (1-1), J Hogan (0-3), M Lowry (0-2), C Maher (0-2), S Leahy (0-2), C Ryan (0-1)		C Sweeney (0-5), R O'Callaghan (1-1), D Brennan (1-0), F O'Sullivan (0-3), C English (0-1)	Referee: D O'Mahoney

== Relegation ==
=== Semi-finals ===
The relegation semi-finals doubled up as Tom Cusack Cup quarter-finals.

17 September 2022 Relegation Semi-Final	Aherlow	2-12 - 2-13 (a.e.t.)	Éire Óg Annacarty	Golden
15.00	T Hanley (1-7, 4f), R Hennessy (1-0), M Elligot (0-3), M Russell (0-1), L Coskeran (0-1)	Report	C Bradshaw (2-0), P O'Dwyer (0-5, 2f), P Bradshaw (0-3), D Mooney (0-1f), C Mooney (0-1), D O'Dwyer (0-1), T Fox (0-1), P Devlin (0-1)	Referee: J Butler

18 September 2022 Relegation Semi-Final	Cahir	0-10 - 0-11	Drom & Inch	Boherlahan
13.30		Report		Referee: G Fitzpatrick

1 October 2022 Relegation Final	Aherlow	0-8 - 1-8	Cahir	Bansha
14.30				Referee: J Cullen

== Knockout stage ==
=== Bracket ===
Quarter-finals
18 September, Clonmel Sportsfield
Moyle Rovers	0-12
Ardfinnan	0-11
17 September, Leahy Park Cashel
Clonmel Commercials	0-21
Arravale Rovers	1-2
17 September, Leahy Park Cashel
Loughmore–Castleiney	1-10
Kilsheelan–Kilcash	0-11
17 September, Holycross
JK Brackens	0-10
Upperchurch–Drombane	1-11

Semi-finals
2 October, Golden
Moyle Rovers	0-9
Clonmel Commercials	1-15
2 October, Golden
Loughmore–Castleiney	1-11
Upperchurch–Drombane	1-12

Final
16 October, Semple Stadium
Clonmel Commercials	1-10
Upperchurch–Drombane	1-2

=== Quarter-finals ===
17 September 2022 Quarter-Final	Clonmel Commercials	0-21 - 1-2	Arravale Rovers	Leahy Park Cashel
15.00	J Lonergan (0-4, 3f), S O'Connor (0-3, 1f), M O'Reilly (0-2, 1f, 1 45'), K Fahey (0-2), A Matassa (0-2), P McGarry (0-2), Colman Kennedy (0-2), S Kennedy (0-1), C Deely (0-1), R Peters (0-1), C Smith (0-1f)	Report	C Maher (1-1), C Ryan (0-1)	Referee: S Lonergan (M)

17 September 2022 Quarter-Final	JK Brackens	0-10 - 1-11	Upperchurch–Drombane	Holycross
16.00	J Kennedy (0-2, 1f), D McEnroe (0-2, 1 45'), C Cadell (0-2), L Fairbrother (0-2), S Bourke (0-1), N Quinlan (0-1)	Report	P Shanahan (1-2, 1-0p, 1f), L Shanahan (0-4, 2f), J Butler (0-2), L Ryan (0-1), C Fahey (0-1), A O'Donoghue (0-1)	Referee: J Leahy

17 September 2022 Quarter-Final	Loughmore–Castleiney	1-10 - 0-11	Kilsheelan–Kilcash	Leahy Park Cashel
17.00	J Ryan (1-0), L McGrath (0-3, 1f), C Ryan (0-2, 1f), N McGrath (0-1), S O'Connell (0-1), Conor McGrath (0-1), A McGrath (0-1), D McCahey (0-1)	Report	B Kehoe (0-6, 5f), M Kehoe (0-2), E Comerford (0-1 45'), S Martin (0-1), J Roche (0-1)	Referee: D O'Mahoney

18 September 2022 Quarter-Final	Moyle Rovers	0-12 - 0-11	Ardfinnan	Clonmel Sportsfield
13.30	Liam Boland (0-6, 3f), D Owens (0-2), C Crowe (0-2), D Ryan (0-1), S Quirke (0-1)	Report	M Barlow (0-8, 6f, 2m), D O'Leary (0-2), G Cronin (0-1)	Referee: S Everard

=== Semi-finals ===
2 October 2022 Semi-Final	Moyle Rovers	0-9 - 1-15	Clonmel Commercials	Golden
13.30	Liam Boland (0-4, 3f), R Quigley (0-2), R Collins (0-1), D Ryan (0-1), D Foley (0-1)	Report	J Lonergan (0-7, 3f), J Kennedy (1-3, 1-0p, 1f), S O'Connor (0-4, 2f), S Kennedy (0-1)	Referee: S Everard

2 October 2022 Semi-Final	Loughmore–Castleiney	1-11 - 1-12	Upperchurch–Drombane	Golden
15.15	L McGrath (1-9, 7f), C Ryan (0-1), N McGrath (0-1)	Report	P Shanahan (0-4f), L Shanahan (0-4), C Fahey (1-0), L Ryan (0-1), A O'Donoghue (0-1), D Grant (0-1), A Ryan (0-1)	Referee: D O'Mahoney

=== Final ===
16 October 2022 Final	Clonmel Commercials	1-10 - 1-02	Upperchurch–Drombane	Semple Stadium
15.15	J Kennedy (0-4, 3f), P Looram (1-0), S O'Connor (0-2, 1m), M Quinlivan (0-2, 1f), J Lonergan (0-1), C Deely (0-1)	Report	C Fahey (1-0), P Shanahan (0-1f), L Shanahan (0-1f)	Referee: Sean Lonergan (M)

== Championship statistics ==
=== Top scorers ===
==== Overall ====
Rank	Player	Club	Tally	Total	Matches	Average
1	Paul Shanahan	Upperchurch–Drombane	3-23	32	6	5.33
2	Sean O'Connor	Clonmel Commercials	2-23	29	6	4.83
3	Liam Boland	Moyle Rovers	0-24	24	4	6
4	Liam McGrath	Loughmore–Castleiney	2-16	22	5	4.4
5	Conor Sweeney	Ballyporeen	0-21	21	3	7
5	Michael Barlow	Ardfinnan	1-18	21	4	5.25
5	Jack Kennedy	Clonmel Commercials	2-15	21	5	4.2
5	Conor Ryan	Loughmore–Castleiney	2-15	21	5	4.2
9	Alan Moloney	Rockwell Rovers	1-16	19	3	6.33
9	Luke Shanahan	Upperchurch–Drombane	0-19	19	6	3.83

==== In a single game ====
Rank	Player	Club	Tally	Total	Opposition
1	Liam McGrath	Loughmore–Castleiney	1-9	12	Upperchurch–Drombane
2	Conor Ryan	Loughmore–Castleiney	2-5	11	Moycarkey–Borris
3	Thomas Hanley	Aherlow	1-6	9	Loughmore–Castleiney
3	Jack Kennedy	Clonmel Commercials	1-6	9	Cahir
5	Michael Barlow	Ardfinnan	0-8	8	Moyle Rovers
5	Liam Boland	Moyle Rovers	0-8	8	Rockwell Rovers
5	Donagh Leahy	Arravale Rovers	2-2	8	Ballyporeen
5	Alan Moloney	Rockwell Rovers	1-5	8	Drom & Inch
5	Sean O'Connor	Clonmel Commercials	1-5	8	Killenaule
5	Paul Shanahan	Upperchurch–Drombane	1-5	8	Cahir
5	Rhys Shelley	Moycarkey–Borris	1-5	8	Ardfinnan
5	Conor Sweeney	Ballyporeen	0-8	8	Éire Óg Annacarty
5	Conor Sweeney	Ballyporeen	0-8	8	JK Brackens
