= West Tipperary Senior Hurling Championship =

- Code: Hurling
- Founded: 1930; 96 years ago
- Region: West Tipperary (GAA)
- No. of teams: 4
- Title holders: Clonoulty-Rossmore (25th title)
- First winner: Clonoulty
- Most titles: Clonoulty-Rossmore (25 titles)
- Sponsors: Tipperary Co-Op
- Official website: Official website

The West Tipperary Senior Hurling Championship (known for sponsorship reasons as the Tipperary Co-Op West Tipperary Senior Hurling Championship) is an annual hurling competition organised by the West Tipperary Board of the Gaelic Athletic Association since 1930 for senior hurling teams in West Tipperary, Ireland.

The championship has always been played using a knock-out format.

The West Tipperary Championship was, until recent times, an integral part of the wider Tipperary Senior Hurling Championship. The winners and runners-up of the West Tipperary Championship joined their counterparts from the other three divisions to contest the county championship quarter-finals.

Four teams currently participate in the West Tipperary Championship. The title has been won at least once by 13 different teams. The all-time record-holders are Clonoulty-Rossmore, who have won a total of 20 titles.

== The championship ==
=== Overview ===
Since there are currently only two senior clubs in the division Clonoulty-Rossmore and Cashel King Cormacs automatically qualify for the final. That game is played as a single leg. If that game ends as a draw there is a period of extra time, followed by a second period of extra time should the teams remain deadlocked. If both sides are still level at the end of extra time a replay takes place and so on until a winner is found.

=== Participating teams ===
Team	Location	Colours
Clonoulty-Rossmore	Clonoulty	Green and yellow
Cashel King Cormacs	Cashel	Red and green

== Roll of honour ==
#	Team	Wins	Years won
1	Clonoulty-Rossmore	25	1930, 1931, 1932, 1933, 1951, 1989, 1992, 1996, 1998, 2002, 2007, 2008, 2009, 2010, 2011, 2012, 2016, 2017, 2018, 2019, 2020, 2021, 2022, 2023, 2025
2	Cashel King Cormacs	18	1934, 1936, 1937, 1939, 1940, 1945, 1948, 1965, 1971, 1975, 1976, 1980, 1988, 1990, 1991, 1993, 1994, 1995
3	Knockavilla-Donaskeigh Kickhams	17	1935, 1938, 1946, 1947, 1949, 1950, 1952, 1953, 1954, 1955, 1956, 1958, 1959, 1960, 1997, 1999, 2006
4	Éire Óg Annacarty	11	1941, 1942, 1943, 1944, 1964, 1967, 1981, 1986, 2013, 2014, 2015
5	Cappawhite	8	1962, 1983, 1984, 1985, 1987, 2000, 2001, 2005
6	Seán Treacy's	7	1968, 1973, 1974, 1977, 1978, 1979, 1982
7	Arravale Rovers	2	1966, 1970
7	Golden-Kilfeacle	2	1969, 1972
9	St Nicholas	1	1957
9	St Vincent's	1	1961
9	St Patrick's	1	1963
9	Galtee Rovers	1	2003
9	Éire Óg-Golden	1	2004

== Finals ==
Year	Winner	Score	Opponent	Score
2025	Clonoulty-Rossmore	2-17	Cashel King Cormacs	1-16
2024	No Championship			
2023	Clonoulty-Rossmore	3-23	Cashel King Cormacs	1-09
2022	Clonoulty-Rossmore	1-20	Éire Óg Annacarty	0-19
2021	Clonoulty-Rossmore	1-21	Cashel King Cormacs	2-13
2020	Clonoulty-Rossmore	1-31	Éire Óg Annacarty	4-12
2019	Clonoulty-Rossmore	1-27 (3-13 R)	Éire Óg Annacarty	1-27 (1-15 R)
2018	Clonoulty-Rossmore	0-20	Éire Óg Annacarty	1-15
2017	Clonoulty-Rossmore	1-14	Éire Óg Annacarty	1-09
2016	Clonoulty-Rossmore	2-19	Knockavilla-Donaskeigh Kickhams	0-07
2015	Éire Óg Annacarty	0-16	Knockavilla-Donaskeigh Kickhams	2-09
2014	Éire Óg Annacarty	1-14	Clonoulty-Rossmore	0-09
2013	Éire Óg Annacarty	4-17	Clonoulty-Rossmore	1-17
2012	Clonoulty-Rossmore	1-22	Éire Óg Annacarty	2-11
2011	Clonoulty-Rossmore	1-26	Cappawhite	0-13
2010	Clonoulty-Rossmore	2-25	Éire Óg Annacarty	1-09
2009	Clonoulty-Rossmore	2-11	Cappawhite	0-12
2008	Clonoulty-Rossmore	1-13	Éire Óg Annacarty	0-09
2007	Clonoulty-Rossmore	1-18	Knockavilla-Donaskeigh Kickhams	0-11
2006	Knockavilla-Donaskeigh Kickhams	1-14	Clonoulty-Rossmore	0-12
2005	Cappawhite	2-20	Cashel King Cormacs	1-09
2004	Éire Óg-Golden	2-12	Clonoulty-Rossmore	1-14
2003	Galtee Rovers	0-11 (2-15 R)	Knockavilla-Donaskeigh Kickhams	1-08 (1-11 R)
2002	Clonoulty-Rossmore	2-12	Knockavilla-Donaskeigh Kickhams	2-11
2001	Cappawhite	1-11	Knockavilla-Donaskeigh Kickhams	1-08
2000	Cappawhite	3-17	Knockavilla-Donaskeigh Kickhams	1-13
1999	Knockavilla-Donaskeigh Kickhams	1-21	Éire Óg Annacarty	0-07
1998	Clonoulty-Rossmore	0-12	Golden-Kilfeacle	0-08
1997	Knockavilla-Donaskeigh Kickhams	0-19	Cappawhite	2-10
1996	Clonoulty-Rossmore	2-13	Cashel King Cormacs	0-06
1995	Cashel King Cormacs	2-11	Knockavilla-Donaskeigh Kickhams	0-10
1994	Cashel King Cormacs	1-16 (2-12 R)	Clonoulty-Rossmore	2-13 (1-08 R)
1993	Cashel King Cormacs	2-15	Knockavilla-Donaskeigh Kickhams	2-12
1992	Clonoulty-Rossmore	2-15	Cashel King Cormacs	1-11
1991	Cashel King Cormacs	0-12	Cappawhite	0-08
1990	Cashel King Cormacs	2-11	Clonoulty-Rossmore	0-15
1989	Clonoulty-Rossmore	3-20	Cappawhite	4-06
1988	Cashel King Cormacs	1-12	Knockavilla-Donaskeigh Kickhams	1-04
1987	Cappawhite	4-15	Clonoulty-Rossmore	3-10
1986	Éire Óg Annacarty	2-09	Golden-Kilfeacle	1-10
1985	Cappawhite	1-10	Cashel King Cormacs	0-09
1984	Cappawhite	2-18	Knockavilla-Donaskeigh Kickhams	3-07
1983	Cappawhite	4-10	Cashel King Cormacs	1-06
1982	Seán Treacy's	1-15	Éire Óg Annacarty	1-12
1981	Cappawhite	0-7	Éire Óg Annacarty	0-14
1980	Seán Treacy's	0-15 (2-13 R)	Cashel King Cormacs	0-15 (2-11 R)
1979	Seán Treacy's	3-16	Cappawhite	2-09
1978	Seán Treacy's	3-13	Cappawhite	3-03
1977	Seán Treacy's	4-14	Knockavilla-Donaskeigh Kickhams	0-09
1976	Cashel King Cormacs	2-09	Cappawhite	2-05
1975	Cashel King Cormacs	0-18	Seán Treacy's	0-13
1974	Seán Treacy's	4-10	Golden-Kilfeacle	0-06
1973	Seán Treacy's	1-08	Éire Óg Annacarty	0-08
1972	Golden-Kilfeacle		Cashel King Cormacs	
1971	Cashel King Cormacs		Lattin-Cullen	
1970	Arravale Rovers		Golden-Kilfeacle	
1969	Golden-Kilfeacle		Arravale Rovers	
1968	Seán Treacy's		Éire Óg Annacarty	
1967	Éire Óg Annacarty		Arravale Rovers	
1966	Arravale Rovers		Golden-Kilfeacle	
1965	Cashel King Cormacs		Éire Óg Annacarty	
1964	Éire Óg Annacarty		Cappawhite	
1963	St Patrick's		Suir Rovers	
1962	Cappawhite		Knockavilla-Donaskeigh Kickhams	
1961	St Vincent's		Solohead	
1960	Knockavilla-Donaskeigh Kickhams		Solohead	
1959	Knockavilla-Donaskeigh Kickhams		Rossmore	
1958	Knockavilla-Donaskeigh Kickhams		Golden-Kilfeacle	
1957	St Nicholas'		Cashel King Cormacs	
1956	Knockavilla-Donaskeigh Kickhams		Golden-Kilfeacle	
1955	Knockavilla-Donaskeigh Kickhams		Cashel King Cormacs	
1954	Knockavilla-Donaskeigh Kickhams		Clonoulty	
1953	Knockavilla-Donaskeigh Kickhams		Clonoulty	
1952	Knockavilla-Donaskeigh Kickhams		Clonoulty	
1951	Clonoulty		Knockavilla-Donaskeigh Kickhams	
1950	Knockavilla-Donaskeigh Kickhams		Cashel King Cormacs	
1949	Knockavilla-Donaskeigh Kickhams		Golden-Kilfeacle	
1948	Cashel King Cormacs		Knockavilla-Donaskeigh Kickhams	
1947	Knockavilla-Donaskeigh Kickhams		Éire Óg Annacarty	
1946	Knockavilla-Donaskeigh Kickhams		Éire Óg Annacarty	
1945	Cashel King Cormacs		Éire Óg Annacarty	
1944	Éire Óg Annacarty		Cashel King Cormacs	
1943	Éire Óg Annacarty		Cappawhite	
1942	Éire Óg Annacarty		Galtee Rovers	
1941	Éire Óg Annacarty		Golden	
1940	Cashel King Cormacs		Clonoulty	
1939	Cashel King Cormacs		Solohead	
1938	Knockavilla-Donaskeigh Kickhams		Éire Óg Annacarty	
1937	Cashel King Cormacs		Clonoulty	
1936	Cashel King Cormacs		Golden	
1935	Knockavilla-Donaskeigh Kickhams		Clonoulty	
1934	Cashel King Cormacs		Clonoulty	
1933	Clonoulty		Cappawhite/Donohill	
1932	Clonoulty		Cappawhite/Donohill	
1931	Clonoulty		Newport	
1930	Clonoulty		Solohead	

== Records ==
=== By decade ===
The most successful team of each decade, judged by number of West Tipperary Senior Hurling Championship titles, is as follows:

- 1930s: 4 each for Clonoulty-Rossmore (1930-31-32-33) and Cashel King Cormacs (1934-36-37-39)
- 1940s: 4 for Éire Óg Annacarty (1941-42-43-44)
- 1950s: 8 for Knockavilla-Donaskeigh Kickhams (1950-52-53-54-55-56-58-59)
- 1960s: 2 for Éire Óg Annacarty (1964-67)
- 1970s: 5 for Seán Treacy's (1973-74-77-78-79)
- 1980s: 4 for Cappawhite (1983-84-85-87)
- 1990s: 5 for Cashel King Cormacs (1990-91-93-94-95)
- 2000s: 4 for Clonoulty-Rossmore (2002-07-08-09)
- 2010s: 7 for Clonoulty-Rossmore (2010-11-12-16-17-18-19)

=== Gaps ===
Longest gaps between successive championship titles:

- 38 years: Clonoulty-Rossmore (1951-1989)
- 37 years: Knockavilla-Donaskeigh Kickhams (1960-1997)
- 27 years: Éire Óg Annacarty (1986-2013)
- 21 years: Cappawhite (1962-1983)
- 20 years: Éire Óg Annacarty (1944-1964)
- 18 years: Clonoulty-Rossmore (1933-1951)
- 17 years: Cashel King Cormacs (1948-1965)
- 14 years: Éire Óg Annacarty (1967-1981)
- 13 years: Cappawhite (1987-2000)
