= 2021 Tipperary Senior Football Championship =

- Teams: 16
- Sponsor: FBD Insurance
- Champions: Loughmore–Castleiney (15th title); Willie Eviston (captain); Frankie McGrath (manager)
- Runners-up: Clonmel Commercials; Jamie Peters (captain); Charlie McGeever (manager)
- Relegated: Moyne–Templetuohy

The 2021 Tipperary Senior Football Championship was the 131st staging of the Tipperary Senior Football Championship since its establishment by the Tipperary County Board in 1887.

Clonmel Commercials were the defending champions but lost in the final to Loughmore–Castleiney.

== Team changes ==
The following teams have changed division since the 2020 Tipperary Senior Football Championship.

=== To S.F.C. ===
Promoted from 2020 Tipperary I.F.C.

- Rockwell Rovers

=== From S.F.C. ===
Relegated to 2021 Tipperary I.F.C.

- Galtee Rovers

== Group stage ==
Advance to quarter-finals

=== Group 1 ===
Team	Matches				Score			Pts
Team	Pld	W	D	L	For	Against	Diff	Pts
Moyle Rovers	3	3	0	0	7-30	2-20	+25	6
Upperchurch–Drombane	3	2	0	1	1-34	4-20	+5	4
Aherlow	3	1	0	2	2-24	3-36	-15	2
Cahir	3	0	0	3	3-22	4-34	-15	0

==== Results ====
3 September 2021 Round 1	Cahir	1-10 - 1-14	Aherlow	Ballyporeen
19:30				Referee: Brian Tyrell

4 September 2021 Round 1	Upperchurch–Drombane	0-9 - 3-9	Moyle Rovers	Leahy Park
18:00		Report	Liam Boland 1-4, Stephen Quirke 1-1, Luke Boland 1-0, Shane Foley 0-3, Ben Owens 0-1	Referee: Michael Duffy

19 September 2021 Round 2	Aherlow	1-6 - 2-14	Moyle Rovers	Leahy Park
14:00	Barry Grogan 1-5, Tadhg Carew 0-1		Rian Quigley 1-4, Liam Boland 0-4, Shane Foley 1-0, Stephen Quirke 0-3, Diarmuid Foley 0-1, Luke Boland 0-1, Darragh O'Dwyer 0-1	Referee: Derek O'Mahoney

19 September 2021 Round 2	Upperchurch–Drombane	1-13 - 1-7	Cahir	Boherlahan
17:30				Referee: Tom Loughnane

2 October 2021 Round 3	Upperchurch–Drombane	0-12 - 0-4	Aherlow	Pairc Ciocaim
17:00				Referee: Sean Lonergan

2 October 2021 Round 3	Cahir	1-5 - 2-7	Moyle Rovers	Clonmel Sportsfield
17:00	Sean Murphy 1-0, Jack Buckley 0-2, Kevin Grogan 0-2, Brian McKenna 0-1	Report	Liam Boland 1-3, Diarmuid Foley 1-0, Aidan McGrath, Shane Foley 0-2, Riain Quigley 0-2	Referee: David Grogan

=== Group 2 ===
Team	Matches				Score			Pts
Team	Pld	W	D	L	For	Against	Diff	Pts
Kilsheelan–Kilcash	3	2	0	1	3-31	1-31	+6	4
Ballyporeen	3	1	1	1	1-35	2-33	-1	3
Éire Óg Annacarty	3	1	1	1	1-27	1-30	-3	3
Moyne–Templetuohy	3	1	0	2	1-36	2-35	-2	2

==== Results ====
2 September 2021 Round 1	Éire Óg Annacarty	0-9 - 1-14	Moyne–Templetuohy	Boherlahan
18:45				Referee: Tom Loughnane

4 September 2021 Round 1	Ballyporeen	0-12 - 2-12	Kilsheelan–Kilcash	Ardfinnan
18:00				Referee: Derek O'Mahoney

18 September 2021 Round 2	Kilsheelan–Kilcash	1-12 - 0-10	Moyne-Templetuohy	Leahy Park
14:30	Paul Maher 1-1, Jamie Roche 0-3, Evan Comerford 0-2, Barry Kehoe 0-2, Martin Gibbs 0-1, Billy O’Connor 0-1, Mark Kehoe 0-1, Sean Martin 0-1	Report	Conor Bowe 0-4, John Hassett 0-3, Tom Meade 0-2, Tom Hassett 0-1	Referee: David Grogan

18 September 2021 Round 2	Ballyporeen	0-9 - 0-9	Eire Og Annacarty	Canon Hayes Park
17:30	Conor Sweeney 0-4, Fionan O’Sullivan 0-3, Eoin Morrissey 0-1, Christy English 0-1	Report	Kevin Fox 0-3, Darragh Mooney 0-1, Paul Downey 0-1, Donal O’Dwyer 0-1, Brian Fox 0-1, Seanie Ryan 0-1, Mikey Bradshaw 0-1	Referee: Seanie Peters

3 October 2021 Round 3	Eire Og Annacarty	1-9 - 0-7	Kilsheelan–Kilcash	Boherlahan
14:00	Dinny Crosse (0-5), Cian Mooney (1-0), Connie Bradshaw (0-1), Tom Fox (0-1), Darragh Mooney (0-1), Paul Downey (0-1)	Report	Evan Comerford (0-2), Emmet Butler (0-1), Billy O’Connor (0-1), Paul Denn (0-1), Luke Kiely (0-1), Barry Kehoe (0-1)	Referee: Seanie Peters

3 October 2021 Round 3	Ballyporeen	1-14 - 0-12	Moyne–Templetuohy	Leahy Park
15:00				Referee: Tom Loughnane

=== Group 3 ===
Team	Matches				Score			Pts
Team	Pld	W	D	L	For	Against	Diff	Pts
Clonmel Commercials	3	3	0	0	10-40	2-11	+53	6
Ardfinnan	3	2	0	1	3-32	4-33	-4	4
Arravale Rovers	3	1	0	2	3-26	8-47	-36	2
Moycarkey–Borris	3	0	0	3	0-21	2-28	-13	0

==== Results ====
5 September 2021 Round 1	Ardfinnan	1-7 - 4-17	Clonmel Commercials	Duneske
15:30				Referee: Seanie Peters

5 September 2021 Round 1	Arravale Rovers	2-15 - 0-12	Moycarkey–Borris	Golden
15:30				Referee: Sean Lonergan

19 September 2021 Round 2	Arravale Rovers	1-4 - 6-23	Clonmel Commercials	Duneske
14:00				Referee: John Butler

19 September 2021 Round 2	Ardfinnan	0-13 - 0-9	Moycarkey–Borris	Golden
17:30				Referee: Paddy Russell

2 October 2021 Round 3	Ardfinnan	2-12 - 0-7	Arravale Rovers	Duneske
13:00	Michael Barlow (0-8), Billy Hewitt (1-3), Andrew Browne (1-0), Gavin Whelan (0-1)	Report	Mikey O'Dwyer (0-3), Cormac Maher (0-2), James Hogan (0-1), Donough Leahy (0-1)	Referee: Brian Tyrell

3 October 2021 Round 3	Clonmel Commercials	0-0 - CONC	Moycarkey–Borris	Killenaule
17:00				Referee: Derek O'Mahoney

=== Group 4 ===
Team	Matches				Score			Pts
Team	Pld	W	D	L	For	Against	Diff	Pts
JK Brackens	3	2	1	0	5-35	3-25	+16	5
Loughmore–Castleiney	3	2	1	0	4-30	0-30	+12	5
Killenaule	3	1	0	2	3-30	3-31	-1	2
Rockwell Rovers	3	0	0	3	2-24	8-33	-27	0

==== Results ====
4 September 2021 Round 1	Loughmore–Castleiney	2-10 - 0-11	Killenaule	Littleton
18:00	Conor Ryan 0-6, Joey Hennessy 1-0, Cian Hennessy 1-0, Liam Treacy 0-2, Noel McGrath 0-1, John McGrath 0-1	Report	Joe O'Dwyer 0-4, Ciaran O'Dwyer 0-2, P Codd 0-1, Mark Heffernan 0-1, Paudie Feehan 0-1, Kieran Bergin 0-1, Michael Doyle 0-1	Referee: David Grogan

4 September 2021 Round 1	Rockwell Rovers	1-8 - 5-11	JK Brackens	St. Michael's Park
18:00		Report		Referee: Tom Loughnane

18 September 2021 Round 2	Killenaule	1-12 - 1-7	Rockwell Rovers	Barracks Field
17:30	John O’Dwyer (1-4), Michael Doyle (0-3), Ciaran O’Dwyer (0-2), Dean O’Connor (0-1), Joe O’Dwyer (0-1), Kieran Bergin (0-1)	Report	Eoin Byrne (1-0), Gavin Ryan (0-3), Alan Moloney (0-3), Kevin Cleary (0-1)	Referee: Brian Tyrell

18 September 2021 Round 2	JK Brackens	0-10 - 0-10	Loughmore–Castleiney	Templetuohy
18:00		Report	Conor Ryan 0-8, Aidan McGrath 0-1, Joey Hennessy 0-1	Referee: Sean Everard

2 October 2021 Round 3	JK Brackens	0-14 - 2-7	Killenaule	Templetuohy
17:00		Report		Referee: Paddy Russell

2 October 2021 Round 3	Loughmore–Castleiney	2-10 - 0-9	Rockwell Rovers	St. Michael's Park
17:00				Referee: John Butler

== Finals ==
=== Bracket ===
Quarter-finals
23 October, Ardfinnan
Moyle Rovers	2-9
Ballyporeen	0-10
23 October, Leahy Park
Kilsheelan–Kilcash	1-5
Loughmore–Castleiney	0-9
24 October, Golden
JK Brackens	2-10
Ardfinnan	2-8
24 October, Boherlahan
Clonmel Commercials	1-20
Upperchurch–Drombane	1-5

Semi-finals
6 November, Golden
Moyle Rovers	1-7
Loughmore–Castleiney	1-8
7 November, Boherlahan
JK Brackens	1-10
Clonmel Commercials	2-11

Final
21 November, Semple Stadium
Loughmore–Castleiney	1-12
Clonmel Commercials	1-11

=== Quarter-finals ===
23 October 2021 Quarter-Final	Moyle Rovers	2-9 - 0-10	Ballyporeen	Ardfinnan
15.30	Riain Quigley (1-2), Liam Boland (0-5), Diarmuid Foley (1-0), Shane Foley (0-1), Dara Ryan (0-1)	Report	Conor Sweeney (0-2), John O’Callaghan (0-1), Tommy Sweeney (0-1), Christy English (0-1), Thomas Vaughan (0-1), Fionán O’Sullivan (0-1), Darragh Brennan (0-1), Darragh Lyons (0-1), Eoin Kearney (0-1)	Referee: Sean Everard

23 October 2021 Quarter-Final	Kilsheelan–Kilcash	1-5 - 0-9	Loughmore–Castleiney	Leahy Park
15.30		Report

24 October 2021 Quarter-Final	JK Brackens	2-10 - 2-8	Ardfinnan	Golden
13.00	Jack Kennedy (0-7), Eanna McBride (2-0), Paddy Cadell (0-1), Jordan Moloney (0-1), Shane Doyle (0-1)	Report	Gavin Whelan (1-0) Darragh O Leary (1-0), Billy Hewitt (0-3), Luke O Brien (0-1) Michael Barlow (0-1), Gerry Cronin (0-1), Sean Nagle, (0-1) Michael O’Sullivan (0-1)	Referee: Seanie Peters

24 October 2021 Quarter-Final	Clonmel Commercials	1-20 - 1-5	Upperchurch–Drombane	Boherlahan
15.30				Referee: Derek O'Mahoney

=== Semi-finals ===
6 November 2021 Semi-Final	Moyle Rovers	1-7 - 1-8	Loughmore–Castleiney	Golden
	S Quirke (1-3), L Boland (0-1), S Foley (0-1), R Quigley (0-1), P Acheson (0-1)	Report	J McGrath (1-1), C Ryan (0-3), L McGrath (0-1), L Treacy (0-1), E Sweeney (0-1), L Egan (0-1)

7 November 2021 Semi-Final	JK Brackens	1-10 - 2-11	Clonmel Commercials	Boherlahan
	J Kennedy (0-8), S Doyle (1-0), D McEnroe (0-1), C Cadell (0-1)	Report	S O Connor (1-4), K Fahey(1-1), S Kennedy (0-1), Colman Kennedy (0-1), Conal Kennedy (0-1), P Looram (0-1), A Matassa (0-1), J Kennedy (0-1)

=== Final ===
21 November 2021 Final	Loughmore–Castleiney	1-12 - 1-11	Clonmel Commercials	Semple Stadium
14.30	C Ryan (0-7, 4f), J McGrath (1-2, 0-1f), Eamonn Connolly (0-1), L McGrath (0-1), E Sweeney (0-1)	Report	M Quinlivan (1-0), J Lonergan (0-3), S O'Connor (0-2, 1f), K Fahey (0-2), P Looram (0-1), J Peters (0-1), Colman Kennedy (0-1), C Deeley (0-1)	Attendance: 2,207; Referee: Derek O'Mahoney (Ardfinnan)

== Championship statistics ==
=== Miscellaneous ===
- Loughmore–Castleiney won the double for the second time in their history.
