= 2013 Tipperary Senior Hurling Championship =

Annual hurling competition season

- Dates: 15 June – 13 October 2013
- Teams: 32
- Sponsor: Clean Ireland Recycling
- Champions: Loughmore–Castleiney (3rd title); Ciarán McGrath (captain); Declan Laffan (manager)
- Runners-up: Nenagh Éire Óg; Noel Maloney (captain); Liam Heffernan (manager)
- Relegated: Golden–Kilfeacle

Tournament statistics
- Top scorer(s): Brendan Maher (2–47)

The 2013 Tipperary Senior Hurling Championship was the 122nd staging of the Tipperary Senior Hurling Championship since its establishment in 1887. The championship began on 15 June 2013 and ended on 13 October 2013.

Thurles Sarsfields were the defending champions, however, they were defeated in their opening game. Loughmore-Castleiney won the title, following a 1–17 to 1–16 defeat of Nenagh Éire Óg in the final.

== Results ==
=== Round 1 ===
15 June 2013 Round 1	Roscrea	3-16 - 0-11	Cashel King Cormacs	Páirc Shíleáin
	J Fitzpatrick 0-7, T Fitzgerald 2-0, D Flynn 0-5, D Buckley 1-1, E Fitzgerald 0-1, L England 0-1, J Bergin 0-1.		J Grogan 0-5, D Fitzelle 0-2, M Coleman 0-2, E Walsh 0-1, R Anglim 0-1.

15 June 2013 Round 1	Holycross–Ballycahill	0-18 - 0-15	Moneygall	Páirc Shíleáin
	T Comerford 0-6, J Woods 0-6, M Doyle 0-2, R Stakelum 0-2, T Quinlan 0-1, C McGrath 0-1.		W Greene 0-11, G Kirwan 0-3, E McCormack 0-1.

15 June 2013 Round 1	Kilruane MacDonaghs	0-16 - 0-09	Borrisokane	St Michael's Park
	B O'Meara 0-8, M O'Leary 0-3, T Carey 0-2, W Cleary 0-1, M Costello 0-1, K Cahill 0-1.		S Dooley 0-6, P Austin 0-1, C Larkin 0-1, G McMahon 0-1.

16 June 2013 Round 1	Portroe	3-22 - 0-09	Golden–Kilfeacle	Bishop Quinlan Park
	J Sheedy 0-6, M Gennery 1-3, J Ryan 0-4, A Freeman 1-1, K O'Halloran 0-3, D Gleeson 0-2, J Creamer 0-2, S Kelly 0-1.		B Moloney 0-3, J Keane 0-2, S O'Halloran 0-2, S Ryan 0-1, J McCarthy 0-1.

16 June 2013 Round 1	JK Brackens	3-13 - 0-09	Lorrha	St Flannan's Park
	S Bourke 1-4, C Scully 1-2, B Kennedy 0-4, J Bergin 1-0, S Scully 0-2, D McEnroe 0-1.		M O'Meara 0-2, P Maher 0-2, B Moran 0-1, R O'Meara 0-1, C Hogan 0-1, N Hogan 0-1, C Haugh 0-1.

16 June 2013 Round 1	Templederry Kenyons	6-20 - 1-07	Boherlahan–Dualla	The Ragg
	G Ryan 2-5, J Kennedy 1-7, A Ryan 1-3, B Stapleton 1-2, D Carey 0-3, M Hogan 1-0, P Hogan 0-1.		D Hickey 0-4, B Maher 1-0, F McCullagh 0-2, W Hickey 0-1.

16 June 2013 Round 1	Nenagh Éire Óg	0-15 - 0-12	Thurles Sarsfields	The Ragg
	K Tucker 0-7, T Heffernan 0-4, P Murphy 0-2, S Geaney 0-1, K Gleeson 0-1.		P Bourke 0-8, S Cahill 0-3, M O'Brien 0-1.

19 June 2013 Round 1	Burgess	1-17 - 0-13	Carrick Davins	Boherlahan Grounds
	E Hogan 0-6, D O'Brien 1-1, B Hogan 0-3, D Ryan 0-3, T Hogan 0-2, M Flaherty 0-1, N Gleeson 0-1.		JJ Butler 0-6, N Butler 0-3, G Robinson 0-2, W O'Dwyer 0-1, P Harris 0-1.

=== Round 2 ===
21 June 2013 Round 2	Borris–Ileigh	5-18 - 0-09	JK Brackens	The Ragg
	B Maher 1-10, K Maher 2-0, C Kenny 1-1, K Ryan 1-0, B Harkin 0-2, M Bourke 0-2, S Burke 0-1, T Fahy 0-1, S McCormack 0-1.		S Bourke 0-4, B Kennedy 0-4, S Scully 0-1.

22 June 2013 Round 2	Toomevara	3-21 - 1-26	Kilruane MacDonaghs	MacDonagh Park
	K Dunne 1-12, E Brislane 1-1, W Ryan 0-3, D Nolan 1-0, B Dunne 0-1, J McLoughney 0-1, F Devaney 0-1, B McCormack 0-1, C Canning 0-1.		K Cahill 0-10, M O'Leary 0-7, E Wiliams 1-1, B O'Meara 0-3, T Cleary 0-2, N O'Meara 0-2, M Costello 0-1.

22 June 2013 Round 2	Moycarkey–Borris	1-14 - 1-12	Portroe	Bishop Quinlan Park
	P Molloy 0-6, W Dempsey 1-1, D Sheppard 0-2, R O'Regan 0-2, A Power 0-1, C Clohessy 0-1, R Ryan 0-1.		J Sheedy 0-6, J Ryan 0-4, M Gennery 1-0, S Kelly 0-1, J Ryan 0-1.

23 June 2013 Round 2	Templederry Kenyons	3-21 - 0-10	Ballingarry	Páirc Shíleáin
	G Ryan 2-5, J Kennedy 0-8, B Stapleton 0-3, T Ryan 1-0, M Hogan 0-2, P Ryan 0-1, A Ryan 0-1, D Shanahan 0-1.		S Cahill 0-7, D Shelly 0-2, I Ivors 0-1.

23 June 2013 Round 2	Roscrea	2-14 - 2-11	Knockavilla–Donaskeigh Kickhams	Páirc Shíleáin
	J Fitzpatrick 0-8, D Flynn 1-1, D Ryan 1-0, E Fitzgerald 0-1, E Flynn 0-1, T Fitzgerald 0-1, D Moloney 0-1, J Bergin 0-1.		A Horgan 1-6, N Hayes 1-1, R Horgan 0-2, B Horgan 0-1, D Butler 0-1.

28 June 2013 Round 2	Nenagh Éire Óg	1-18 - 0-09	Mullinahone	Boherlahan Grounds
	T Heffernan 1-3, M Heffernan 0-4, S Geaney 0-4, D Quinn 0-3, K Tucker 0-2, B Quinn 0-1, J Mackey 0-1.		E Kelly 0-9.

30 June 2013 Round 2	Upperchurch–Drombane	1-19 - 0-15	Holycross–Ballycahill	The Ragg
	P Shortt 0-9, P Ryan 1-3, LJ Ryan 0-3, P Greene 0-2, J Brennan 0-1, J Quinn 0-1.		J Woods 0-12, P Stakelum 0-2, R Stakelum 0-1.

8 July 2013 Round 2	Burgess	0-22 - 1-11	Cappawhite	Lacken Park
	E Hogan 0-13, E Hogan (T) 0-2, D O'Brien 0-2, N Gleeson 0-2, D Maher 0-1, D Ryan 0-1, M O'Flaherty 0-1.		J O'Neill 1-8, T Cranley 0-1, R Quirke 0-1, J McGrath 0-1.

=== Round 3 ===
27 July 2013 Round 3	Nenagh Éire Óg	2-18 - 1-17	Upperchurch–Drombane	Páirc Shíleáin
	M Heffernan 0-6, K Tucker 1-3, R Flannery 1-1, T Heffernan 0-3, J Mackey 0-2, B Quinn 0-1, P Murphy 0-1, D Quinn 0-1.		P Shortt 0-7, J Barry 1-1, P Greene 0-3, A Kinnane 0-2, LJ Ryan 0-2, M Greene 0-1, J Quinn 0-1.

4 August 2013 Round 3	Roscrea	1-12 - 1-11	Moycarkey–Borris	Páirc Shíleáin
	D Flynn 1-5, J Bergin 0-2, S Conlon 0-2, J Fitzpatrick 0-2, T Fitzgerald 0-1.		P Molloy 0-5, C Hayes 1-0, R Ryan 0-2, P Carey 0-1, A Healy 0-1, A Power 0-1, W Dempsey 0-1.

10 August 2013 Round 3	Borris–Ileigh	1-25 - 4-12	Burgess	MacDonagh Park
	B Maher 0-13, C Kenny 0-4, M Bourke 0-4, K Maher 1-0, K Ryan 0-1, B Harkin 0-1, A Cowan 0-1, M Stapleton 0-1.		E Hogan 1-8, D O'Brien 1-3, S Murray 1-0, T Hogan 1-0, N Hogan 0-1.

17 August 2013 Round 3	Toomevara	0-24 - 2-17	Templederry Kenyons	MacDonagh Park
	K Dunne 0-9, D Nolan 0-4, F Devaney 0-3, J O'Brien 0-2, W Ryan 0-2, J Ryan 0-1, B Dunne 0-1, D Young 0-1, D Delaney 0-1.		G Ryan 1-3, P O'Leary 1-2, A Ryan 0-4, B Stapleton 0-4, J Kennedy 0-3, T Stapleton 0-1.

=== Round 4 ===
24 August 2013 Round 4	Nenagh Éire Óg	1-21 - 0-08	Silvermines	MacDonagh Park
	K Tucker 0-8, M Hefferan 1-4, T Heffernan 0-3, B Quinn 0-2, R Flannery 0-1, B Heffernan 0-1, D Quinn 0-1, J Slattery 0-1		J Forde 0-3, O Quirke 0-2, D Keogh 0-1, S Quirke 0-1, D Boland 0-1.

24 August 2013 Round 4	Loughmore–Castleiney	0-21 - 2-11	Roscrea	Páirc Shíleáin
	N McGrath 0-11, J McGrath 0-3, E Sweeney 0-2, C McGrath 0-2, A McGrath 0-1, J Meagher 0-1, J Ryan 0-1.		S Conlon 0-6, J Fitzpatrick 1-1, T Fitzgerald 1-0, P Kirwan 0-1, D Flynn 0-1, E Fitzgerald 0-1, E Flynn 0-1.

7 September 2013 Round 4	Borris–Ileigh	1-17 -2-08	Carrick Swans	St Michael's Park
	B Maher 0-6, K Ryan 1-2, K Maher 0-3, M Bourke 0-2, D McCormack 0-2, C Kenny 0-2.		D O'Hanlon 1-3, A O'Donnell 1-0, L Wall 0-2, AP Ryan 0-1, D O'Hanlon 0-1, G Walsh 0-1.

7 September 2013 Round 4	Clonoulty–Rossmore	1-23 - 2-16	Toomevara	St Michael's Park
	T Hammersley 0-8, F O'Keeffe 1-2, J O'Neill 0-3, P White 0-2, S Maher 0-2, J O'Keeffe 0-1, P Heffernan 0-1, C Hammersley 0-1, A White 0-1, T Burke 0-1.		K Dunne 0-5, C Canning 1-1, M McCarthy 1-0, J McLoughney 0-3, W Ryan 0-3, J Ryan 0-1, D Nolan 0-1, J Delaney 0-1, J O'Brien 0-1.

=== Relegation playoffs ===
14 July 2013 Semi-final	Moneygall	1-14 - 0-10	Cashel King Cormacs	The Ragg
	W Greene 0-8, G Kirwan 1-3, E McCormack 0-2, E Ryan 0-1.		J Grogan 0-5, A Cummins 0-3, R Anglim 0-1.

14 July 2013 Semi-final	Golden–Kilfeacle	1-15 - 2-12	Boherlahan–Dualla	New Inn Grounds
	J Keane 0-8, T Burns 1-1, J Casey 0-2, S O'Halloran 0-2, J McCarthy 0-1, S Ryan 0-1.		D Hickey 1-9, B Maher 1-1, S Hickey 0-1, A Maher 0-1.

26 July 2013 Semi-final replay	Golden–Kilfeacle	0-05 - 0-05 (abandoned)	Boherlahan–Dualla	New Inn Grounds

9 August 2013 Semi-final replay	Golden–Kilfeacle	2-12 - 1-19	Boherlahan–Dualla	St Michael's Park
	K Keane 0-9, J Casey 1-0, A O'Connell 1-0, B Moloney 0-2, D Bargary 0-1.		D Hickey 0-7, C Gleeson 1-3, A Downey 0-2, A Maher 0-2, J Ryan 0-1, J Dwyer 0-1, P Ryan 0-1, B Maher 0-1, P Creed 0-1.

18 August 2013 Final	Cashel King Cormacs	3-13 - 0-09	Golden–Kilfeacle	New Inn Grounds
	J Grogan 1-6, A Cummiins 1-1, R Anglim 1-1, S Delaney 0-1, E O'Dwyer 0-1, M Coleman 0-1, L Burke 0-1, P Taylor 0-1.		J Keane 0-7, C Ryan 0-1, B Moloney 0-1.

=== Quarter-finals ===
14 September 2013 Quarter-final	Killenaule	1-15 - 2-17	Loughmore–Castleiney	Páirc Shíleáin
15:00	J O'Dwyer (0-12), P Kerwick (1-1), M Doyle (0-1), C Bergin (0-1).	Report	C Hennessy (1-2), J McGrath (0-5), E Sweeeney (1-1), N McGrath (0-4), T McGrath (0-2), C McGrath (0-1), D Kennedy (0-1), L McGrath (0-1).	Referee: G Fitzpatrick

14 September 2013 Quarter-final	Drom-Inch	2-11 - 1-15	Nenagh Éire Óg	Páirc Shíleáin
16:30	S Callanan (1-6), D Butler (1-0), Johnny Ryan (0-3), S Butler (0-1), D Collins (0-1).	Report	P Murphy (1-3), M Heffernan (0-6), K Tucker (0-2), T Heffernan (0-2), R Flannery (0-2).	Referee: J McCormack

15 September 2013 Quarter-final	Kildangan	0-14 - 1-11	Clonoulty–Rossmore	The Ragg
14:00	T Gallagher(0-3), W Connors(0-3), R Gleeson(0-3), H Flannery(0-1), J Loughnane(0-1), E Kelly(0-1), D Hackett(0-1), D Egan (0-1).	Report	T Hammersley(0-6), J O'Neill (1-1), F O'Keeffe (0-2), C Hammersley(0-2).	Referee: K Delahunty

15 September 2013 Quarter-final	Éire Óg Annacarty	1-11 - 2-16	Borris-Ileigh	The Ragg
15:30	P O'Dwyer(0-5), C O'Brien (1-1), B Fox (0-1), T Fox (0-1), D O'Dwyer (0-1), S Ryan (0-1), R O'Brien (0-1).	Report	B Maher (0-12), C Kenny (1-0), K Ryan (1-0), D McCormack (0-3), V Stapleton (0-1).	Referee: J Ryan

21 September 2013 Quarter-final replay	Kildangan	3-13 - 2-13	Clonoulty–Rossmore	Dolla Grounds
16:00	R Gleeson 0-9 (0-6 frees), J Gallagher 1-1, T Connors 1-0, D Egan 1-0 (free), T Gallagher 0-1, J Loughnane 0-1, W Connors 0-1.		T Hammersely 0-8, A White 1-0, C Hammersley 1-0, S Maher 0-2, P Heffernan 0-1, F O'Keeffe 0-1, T Butler 0-1.	Referee: P Ivors

=== Semi-finals ===
29 September 2013 Semi-final	Loughmore–Castleiney	1-17 - 2-12	Borris-Ileigh	Semple Stadium
17:00	C Hennessy (1-3), N McGrath (0-5, 0-3 ‘65s), L McGrath (0-5, 0-4 frees), J McGrath (0-2), A McGrath (0-1), T King (0-1).	Report	B Maher (1-6, 0-4 frees), R Kinane (1-0), C Kenny (0-4), D McCormack (0-1), K Ryan (0-1).	Referee: F Horgan

29 September 2013 Semi-final	Nenagh Éire Óg	4-13 - 2-19	Kildangan	Semple Stadium
17:00	M Heffernan (3-1, 0-1 65), K Tucker (0-6F), P Murphy (1-0), Billy Heffernan (0-1), P Morris (0-1), R Flannery (0-1), Donnacha Quinn (0-1), J Mackey (0-1).	Report	J Gallagher (1-2), R Gleeson (0-5F, 0-2 65s), D Egan (1-1F), T Gallagher (0-3), G Slattery (0-2), G Byrne (0-1), J Loughnane (0-1), T Connors (0-1), Eoin Gleeson (0-1).	Referee: J Ryan

6 October 2013 Semi-final replay	Nenagh Éire Óg	1-17 - 0-12	Kildangan	Semple Stadium
15:30	M Heffernan (0-8, 3f, 1 65), K Tucker (0-5, 3f), R Flannery (1-1), P Murphy (0-2), P Ryan (0-1).	Report	R Gleeson (0-7, 6f), E Gleeson (0-1), P Flynn (0-1), D Egan (0-1f), J Loughnane (0-1), J Gallagher (0-1).	Referee: K Delahunty

=== Final ===
13 October 2013 Final	Loughmore–Castleiney	1-17 - 1-16	Nenagh Éire Óg	Semple Stadium
15:30	N McGrath (0-7, 0-2fs); L McGrath 1-2 (0-1 f); A McGrath (0-2, 0-2 f) C Hennessy (0-2), E Sweeney, D Kennedy, C McGrath, T McGrath (0-1).	Report	M Heffernan (0-7, 0-3 fs, 0-1 pen); P Murphy (1-2); P Morris (0-3); T Heffernan (0-2); R Flannery, A Coffey (0-1).	Referee: J McCormack (Knockavilla Kickhams)

== Championship statistics ==
=== Top scorers ===
Rank	Player	Club	Tally	Total	Matches	Average
1	Brendan Maher	Borris–Ileigh	2-47	53	5	10.60
2	Michael Heffernan	Nenagh Éire Óg	4-36	48	8	6.60
3	Kevin Tucker	Nenagh Éire Óg	1-33	36	8	4.50
4	Eoin Hogan	Burgess	1-27	30	3	10.00
5	Ken Dunne	Toomevara	1-26	29	3	9.33
6	Gearóid Ryan	Templederry Kenyons	5-13	28	3	9.33
7	Noel McGrath	Loughmore–Castleiney	0-27	27	4	6.75
8	Ruairí Gleeson	Kildangan	0-24	24	4	6.00
9	Darragh Hickey	Boherlahan–Dualla	0-27	27	4	6.75
10	Timmy Hammersley	Clonoulty–Rossmore	0-22	22	3	7.33
