= 2020 Tipperary Senior Football Championship =

Tipperary S.F.C.
- Season: 2020
- Champions: Clonmel Commercials
- Winning Manager: Charlie McGeever

The 2020 Tipperary Senior Football Championship (sponsored by FBD Insurance) is the 130th edition of the Tipperary GAA's premier club Gaelic football tournament for senior graded teams in County Tipperary, Ireland. The tournament consists of 16 clubs with the winner going on to represent Tipperary in the Munster Senior Club Football Championship.

Clonmel Commercials were the defending champions and retained the title after a 1–16 to 1–15 win against Loughmore–Castleiney in the final on 27 September.

== Regional Champions ==
West Tipperary S.F.C. Final

Mid Tipperary S.F.C. Final

South Tipperary S.F.C. Final

== Team changes ==
The following teams have changed division since the 2019 Tipperary Senior Football Championship.

=== To S.F.C. ===
Promoted from 2019 Tipperary I.F.C.

- Moycarkey–Borris - (Intermediate Champions)

=== From S.F.C. ===
Relegated to 2020 Tipperary I.F.C.

- Kiladangan

== Group stage ==
All 16 teams enter the competition at this stage. The winners of the group stage progress to the semi-finals. The bottom teams of each group enter the relegation play-off.

Advance to semi-finals Advance to relegation semi-final

=== Group A ===
Team	Pld	W	L	D	PF	PA	PD	Pts
Loughmore–Castleiney	3	3	0	0	6-44	1-26	+33	6
Ballyporeen–Clonmel Óg	3	1	2	0	3-28	3-38	-10	2
Moyne–Templetuohy	3	1	2	0	1-32	2-40	-11	2
Ardfinnan	3	1	2	0	1-29	5-29	-12	2

==== Results ====
17 July 2020 Round 1	Loughmore–Castleiney	1-16 - 1-6	Ballyporeen–Clonmel Óg	Cahir
	Conor Ryan (0-8); Conor McGrath (1-0); Joseph Nyland (0-2); Liam Treacy (0-2); Noel McGrath (0-1); Tomas McGrath (0-1); John McGrath (0-1); Evan Sweeney (0-1)	Report	Conor Sweeney (1-0); Daragh Lyons (0-2); Tomas Vaughan (0-2); John O'Callaghan (0-1); Christopher English (0-1)	Referee: Sean Lonergan

19 July 2020 Round 1	Moyne–Templetuohy	0-10 - 0-9	Ardfinnan	Leahy Park, Cashel
	Conor Bowe (0-3); John Hassett (0-2, 2f); Tom Meade (0-2); Odhran Lloyd (0-1, 1f); Thomas Hassett (0-1); Gearoid O'Connor (0-1)	Report	Michael Barlow (0-3); Billy Hewitt (0-2, 2f); Gerry Cronin (0-2, 1f); Gavin Whelan (0-1); Colin Gorman (0-1)	Referee: Paddy Russell

1 August 2020 Round 2	Moyne–Templetuohy	0-13 - 1-17	Loughmore–Castleiney	Templemore
	Conor Bowe (0-4); John Hassett (0-3); Thomas Hassett (0-2); Odhran Lloyd (0-1); Tom Meade (0-1); Gearoid O'Connor (0-1); Mark Ryan (0-1)	Report	Conor McGrath (0-4); Liam Treacy (0-3); Ciaran Connolly (0-3); Peter Nyland (1-0); Conor Ryan (0-2); John McGrath (0-2); Evan Sweeney (0-1); Eamon Connolly (0-1); Lorcan Egan (0-1)	Referee: Tom Loughnane

2 August 2020 Round 2	Ballyporeen–Clonmel Óg	1-8 - 1-13	Ardfinnan	Cahir
	Conor Sweeney (0-4, 3f); Daragh Lyons (1-0); Tommy Sweeney (0-2); Shane Molan (0-1); Tomas Vaughan (0-1)	Report	Luke O'Brien (1-1); Billy Hewitt (0-4, 2f); Michael Barlow (0-4)	Referee: Seanie Peters

23 August 2020 Round 3	Ballyporeen–Clonmel Óg	1-14 - 1-9	Moyne–Templetuohy	Leahy Park, Cashel
	Conor Sweeney (0-7, 4f); Tomas Vaughan (1-2); Christopher English (0-3); Adrian English (0-2)		Conor Bowe (1-2); John Hassett (0-4, 1f); Thomas Hassett (0-1); Dee Leahy (0-1); Tom Meade (0-1)	Referee: Seanie Peters

23 August 2020 Round 3	Ardfinnan	0-7 - 4-11	Loughmore–Castleiney	Boherlahan
	Michael Barlow (0-3, 3f); Billy Hewitt (0-2); Colin O'Gorman (0-1); Gerry Cronin (0-1)		Conor McGrath (3-1); Conor Ryan (0-7, 5f); Joseph Nyland (1-0); Aidan McGrath (0-2); Peter Nyland (0-1)	Referee: Paddy Russell

=== Group B ===
Team	Pld	W	L	D	PF	PA	PD	Pts
Kilsheelan–Kilcash	3	2	0	1	3-44	2-25	+22	5
J.K. Bracken's	3	2	0	1	3-36	1-31	+11	5
Upperchurch–Drombane	3	1	2	0	3-27	0-30	+6	2
Aherlow	3	0	3	0	1-21	7-42	-39	0

18 July 2020 Round 1	Aherlow	0-10 - 3-11	J.K. Bracken's	Dundrum
	Barry Grogan (0-5, 5f); Mark Russell (0-2); Seamus Grogan (0-1)	Report	Dean McEnroe (1-6, 1-5f); Shane Scully (1-1); Cathal Scully (1-0); Eanna McBridge (0-2); Neil Quinlan (0-1); Paddy Caddell (0-1)	Referee: John Butler

19 July 2020 Round 1	Kilsheelan–Kilcash	0-13 - 1-6	Upperchurch–Drombane	New Inn
	Evan Comerford (0-4); Brendan Martin (0-4); Billy O'Connor (0-2); Cathal Kelly (0-1); Sean Martin (0-1); Martin Gibbs (0-1)	Report	Paul Ryan (1-1); Loughlin Ryan (0-1); Jack Butler (0-1); Colm Stapleton (0-1); Niall Grant (0-1); Conor Fahey (0-1)	Referee: Derek O'Mahoney

1 August 2020 Round 2	Upperchurch–Drombane	1-11 - 0-3	Aherlow	Dundrum
	Conor Fahey (1-1); Paul Shanahan (0-3, 2f); Keith Ryan (0-2); Dean Carew (0-2); Colm Stapleton (0-1); Padraig Greene (0-1); Ailbe O'Donoghue (0-1)	Report	Barry Grogan (0-3, 3f)	Referee: Michael Duffy

2 August 2020 Round 2	J.K. Bracken's	0-11 - 0-11	Kilsheelan–Kilcash	Leahy Park, Cashel
	Shane Doyle (0-5); Dean McEnroe (0-3); Kuba Beban (0-2); Lorcan Roche (0-1)	Report	Evan Comerford (0-3); Brendan Martin (0-3); Mark Kehoe (0-2); Mark Stokes (0-1); Sean Martin (0-1); Paul Maher (0-1)	Referee: Brian Tyrell

23 August 2020 Round 3	Kilsheelan–Kilcash	3-20 - 1-8	Aherlow	New Inn
	Brendan Martin (0-12, 5f); Billy O'Connor (1-1); Paul Maher (1-1); Aidan Keane (1-0); Evan Comerford (0-2, 2f); Daire Brennan (0-1); Mark Kehoe (0-1); Sean Martin (0-1); Jamie Roche (0-1)	Report	Barry Grogan (1-4, 0-3f); Sean Kiely (0-2); Mark Russell (0-1); Cathal Dillon (0-1)	Referee: Tom Loughnane

23 August 2020 Round 3	J.K. Bracken's	0-14 - 1-10	Upperchurch–Drombane	The Ragg, Bouladuff
	Dean McEnroe (0-6, 3f); Lorcan Egan (0-2); Michael Egan (0-1); Jordan Moloney (0-1); Eanna McBride (0-1); Paddy Caddell (0-1); Shane Doyle (0-1); Shane Scully (0-1)	Video	Keith Ryan (1-2); Paul Shanahan (0-3, 2f, 1 45); Jack Butler (0-1, 1f); Colm Stapleton (0-1); Conor Fahey (0-1); Paidi Greene (0-1); Niall Grant (0-1)	Referee: Philip Kelly

=== Group C ===
Team	Pld	W	L	D	PF	PA	PD	Pts
Clonmel Commercials	3	3	0	0	7-41	2-19	+37	6
Cahir	3	1	2	0	7-28	5-33	+1	2
Killenaule	3	1	2	0	2-17	2-32	-15	2
Galtee Rovers	3	1	2	0	0-35	7-37	-23	2

==== Results ====
18 July 2020 Round 1	Clonmel Commercials	4-12 - 2-10	Cahir	Ardfinnan
	Sean O'Connor (1-2); Michael Quinlivan (1-1, 1-0p); Seamus Kennedy (1-1); Ryan Lambe (1-1); Jason Lonergan (0-4, 3f); Kevin Fahey (0-2); Ross Peters (0-1)	Report	Mikey O'Connor (1-5, 1-0p, 3f); Niall McKenna (1-0); Ian Flannery (0-3); Sean O'Connor (0-1); Kieran O'Dwyer (0-1)	Referee: Derek O'Mahoney

19 July 2020 Round 1	Killenaule	1-7 - 0-15	Galtee Rovers	Golden
	Michael O'Doyle (1-2); Kieran Bergin (0-2); Paudie Feehan (0-1); Dean O'Connor (0-1); Tony Doyle (0-1)	Report	Shane Egan (0-5, 3f); Adam McGrath (0-3); Darren McGrath (0-2); Shane Ryan (0-2); Eric Grogan (0-1); Daire Egan (0-1); Rhys Baron (0-1)	Referee: Tom Loughnane

1 August 2020 Round 2	Cahir	0-4 - 1-7	Killenaule	Clonmel Sportsfield
	Stephen Grogan (0-2); Ian Flannery (0-1); Liam Casey (0-1)	Report	Paddy Codd (1-0); Tony Doyle (0-2); Dean O'Connor (0-2); Joe O'Dwyer (0-1); Killian O'Dwyer (0-1); Michael O'Doyle (0-1)	Referee: Sean Lonergan

2 August 2020 Round 2	Galtee Rovers	0-6 - 1-16	Clonmel Commercials	New Inn
	Adam McGrath (0-2); Edmund O'Dwyer (0-2); Darren McGrath (0-1); Shane Ryan (0-1)	Report	Jack Kennedy (1-5); Jason Lonergan (0-5); Sean O'Connor (0-4); Seamus Kennedy (0-2)	Referee: David Grogan

22 August 2020 Round 3	Killenaule	0-3 - 2-13	Clonmel Commercials	Monroe
	Gus Browne (0-2); Michael Doyle (0-1)	Report	Sean O'Connor (2-3); Jack Kennedy (0-4); Colman Kennedy (0-3); Michael Quinlivan (0-1); Ryan Lambe (0-1); Seamus Kennedy (0-1)	Referee: Sean Lonergan

22 August 2020 Round 3	Cahir	5-14 - 0-14	Galtee Rovers	New Inn
	Mikey O'Connor (3-2); Brian McKenna (1-2); Niall McKenna (1-0); Liam Casey (0-3); Harry Fitzgerald (0-2); Ger Quinn (0-1); Kieran O'Dwyer (0-1); Kevin Grogan (0-1); Stephen Grogan (0-1); Eddie Kendrick (0-1)	Report	Shane Egan (0-5, 5f); Adam McGrath (0-4, 3f); Edmund O'Dwyer (0-2); Darren McGrath (0-2); Tony O'Brien (0-1)	Referee: Brian Tyrell

=== Group D ===
Team	Pld	W	L	D	PF	PA	PD	Pts
Moyle Rovers	3	3	0	0	3-52	2-24	+31	6
Arravale Rovers	3	1	1	1	1-32	1-29	+3	3
Moycarkey–Borris	3	1	2	0	3-20	2-44	-21	2
Éire Óg Annacarty	3	0	2	1	2-28	4-35	-13	1

==== Results ====
17 July 2020 Round 1	Éire Óg Annacarty	0-14 - 2-9	Moycarkey–Borris	Clonoulty
	Dinny Crosse (0-7, 4f); Darragh Mooney (0-2, 2f); Paul Downey (0-2); Brian Fox (0-1); Mickie Bradshaw (0-1); Donal O'Dwyer (0-1)	Report	Rhys Shelley (0-5, 3f); James Dillon (1-1); Kevin Hayes (1-0); Kyle Shelley (0-2); Darren Flood (0-1)	Referee: David Grogan

18 July 2020 Round 1	Arravale Rovers	0-12 - 0-16	Moyle Rovers	New Inn
	Mikey O'Dwyer (0-7); Johnny Lowry (0-2); Donough Leahy (0-2); Matthew Moroney (0-1)	Report	Liam Boland (0-8); Stephen Quirke (0-4); Shane Foley (0-2); Tadhg Fitzgerald (0-1); Riain Quigley (0-1)	Referee: Sean Everard

1 August 2020 Round 2	Arravale Rovers	1-7 - 1-7	Éire Óg Annacarty	Bansha
	Shane Leahy (1-0); Mikey O'Dwyer (0-3, 1f); Donough Leahy (0-2); David Kelly (0-1); James Hogan (0-1)	Report	Dinny Crosse (1-2, 1-2f); Paidi O'Dwyer (0-2); Liam Og O'Dwyer (0-1); Seanie Ryan (0-1); Paul Downey (0-1)	Referee: John Butler

2 August 2020 Round 2	Moycarkey–Borris	1-5 - 2-17	Moyle Rovers	Golden
	Diarmuid Maher (1-1); Rhys Shelley (0-4)	Report	Liam Boland (0-6, 3f); Shane Foley (1-2); Riain Quigley (0-5); Dara Ryan (1-1); Jack Harney (0-1); Tadgh Fitzgerald (0-1); Stephen Quirke (0-1)	Referee: Derek O'Mahoney

23 August 2020 Round 3	Moycarkey–Borris	0-6 - 0-13	Arravale Rovers	Dundrum
				Referee: David Grogan

23 August 2020 Round 3	Moyle Rovers	1-19 - 1-7	Éire Óg Annacarty	Cahir
				Referee: Derek O'Mahoney

== Relegation play-off ==
=== Semi-finals ===
6 September 2020 Semi-Final	Aherlow	2-9 - 0-8	Ardfinnan	New Inn
				Referee: Sean Lonergan

6 September 2020 Semi-Final	Éire Óg Annacarty	1-6 - 0-8	Galtee Rovers	Sean Treacy Park
				Referee: David Grogan

=== Final ===
19 September 2020 Final	Ardfinnan	0-15 - 1-10	Galtee Rovers	Cahir
		Report		Referee: Tom Loughnane

== Finals ==
=== Bracket ===
Semi-finals
5 September, Ardfinnan
Kilsheelan–Kilcash	0-6
Clonmel Commercials	0-12
12 September, Boherlahan
Moyle Rovers	1-11
Loughmore–Castleiney	0-18

Final
27 September, Semple Stadium
Clonmel Commercials	1-16
Loughmore–Castleiney	1-15

=== Semi-finals ===
5 September 2020 Semi-Final	Kilsheelan–Kilcash	0-6 - 0-12	Clonmel Commercials	Ardfinnan
	Evan Comerford (0-3, 3f); Paul Maher (0-1); Brendan Martin (0-2, 1f)	Report Video	Colman Kennedy (0-4); Jason Lonergan (0-3, 2f); Pauric Looram (0-1); Seamus Kennedy (0-1); Michael Quinlivan (0-1); Sean O'Connor (0-1); Ryan Lambe (0-1)	Referee: Seanie Peters

12 September 2020 Semi-Final	Moyle Rovers	1-11 - 0-18	Loughmore–Castleiney	Boherlahan
	Liam Boland (1-6, 1-0p, 3f); Stephen Quirke (0-3, 2f); Tadgh Fitzgerald (0-1); Riain Quigley (0-1)	Report Video	Conor Ryan (0-7, 5f); Conor McGrath (0-4); Eoghan Ryan (0-1); Aidan McGrath (0-1); Joseph Nyland (0-1); Ciaran Connolly (0-1); John McGrath (0-1); Evan Sweeney (0-1); Liam Treacy (0-1)	Referee: Derek O'Mahoney

=== Final ===
27 September 2020 Final	Clonmel Commercials	1-16 - 1-15	Loughmore–Castleiney	Semple Stadium
	Jason Lonergan 0-5 (3 frees); Michael Quinlivan 1-1; Sean O’Connor 0-3 frees; Seamus Kennedy, Jack Kennedy (1 free) 0-2 each; Colman Kennedy, Conal Kennedy, Ryan Lambe 0-1 each.	Report	Conor Ryan 0-6 (4 frees); Conor McGrath 1-0; John McGrath, Joseph Nyland, Evan Sweeney 0-2 each; Ciaran Connolly, Aidan McGrath, Liam Treacy 0-1 each.	Referee: Sean Peters (Aherlow)
