= John Leamy =

John Leamy may refer to:

- John Leamy (hurler) (born 1964), retired Irish hurler
- John Leamy (merchant) (1757–1839), American trader with Spanish colonies
