= West Tipperary GAA =

West Tipperary GAA (CLG Tiobraid Árann Thiar) is a Gaelic Athletic Association division in County Tipperary, Ireland founded in 1930. The division took clubs mostly from South Tipperary to reduce its size, as well as three others from the Mid and North divisions. The division is one of four affiliated to the Tipperary County Board. It organises competitions for the clubs within the division, from Under 12 up to the adult level in both hurling and Gaelic football. There are currently 15 active GAA clubs in the division. West Tipperary clubs have won 7 Tipperary Senior Hurling Championship titles. The most successful and most recent winners are Clonoulty-Rossmore, last lifting the Dan Breen Cup in 2018. West Tipperary clubs have won 14 Tipperary Senior Football Championships. Arravale Rovers and Galtee Rovers have 6 titles apiece. The most recent winners were Aherlow, who won their second title in 2010.

== Clubs ==
- Aherlow
- Arravale Rovers
- Cappawhite
- Cashel King Cormacs
- Clonoulty-Rossmore
- Éire Óg Annacarty
- Emly
- Galtee Rovers
- Golden-Kilfeacle
- Knockavilla-Donaskeigh Kickhams
- Lattin-Cullen
- Rockwell Rovers
- Rosegreen
- Seán Treacy's
- Solohead

== Hurling ==
=== Championship Grades ===
Championship	Clubs
Senior
Senior	Cashel King Cormacs
Senior	Clonoulty-Rossmore
Intermediate
Premier Intermediate	Arravale Rovers
Premier Intermediate	Éire Óg Annacarty
Premier Intermediate	Golden-Kilfeacle
Premier Intermediate	Seán Treacy's
Intermediate	Knockavilla-Donaskeigh Kickhams
Intermediate	Cappawhite
Junior
Junior A	Cappawhite (2)
Junior A	Cashel King Cormacs (2)
Junior A	Clonoulty-Rossmore (2)
Junior A	Galtee Rovers
Junior A	Lattin-Cullen
Junior A	Rockwell Rovers
Junior B	Arravale Rovers (2)
Junior B	Cashel King Cormacs (3)
Junior B	Clonoulty-Rossmore (3)
Junior B	Éire Óg Annacarty (2)
Junior B	Emly
Junior B	Galtee Rovers (2)
Junior B	Golden-Kilfeacle (2)
Junior B	Knockavilla-Donaskeigh Kickhams (2)
Junior B	Rosegreen
Junior B	Seán Treacy's (2)
Junior B	Solohead
Junior C	Arravale Rovers (3)
Junior C	Cashel King Cormacs (4)
Junior C	Clonoulty-Rossmore (4)
Junior C	Galtee Rovers (3)
Junior C	Knockavilla-Donaskeigh Kickhams (3)
Junior C	Lattin-Cullen (2)

=== Non-hurling clubs ===
Clubs who do not play hurling but are affiliated sister clubs (1)

- Aherlow (Lattin-Cullen hurling)

== Football ==
=== Championship Grades ===
Championship	Clubs
Senior
Senior	Aherlow
Intermediate
Intermediate	Arravale Rovers
Intermediate	Éire Óg Annacarty
Intermediate	Galtee Rovers
Intermediate	Golden-Kilfeacle
Intermediate	Rockwell Rovers
Junior
Premier Junior	Seán Treacy's
Junior A	Arravale Rovers (2)
Junior A	Cappawhite
Junior A	Cashel King Cormacs
Junior A	Clonoulty-Rossmore
Junior A	Emly
Junior A	Golden-Kilfeacle (2)
Junior A	Knockavilla-Donaskeigh Kickhams
Junior B	Aherlow (2)
Junior B	Éire Óg Annacarty (2)
Junior B	Galtee Rovers (2)
Junior B	Rockwell Rovers (2)
Junior B	Rosegreen
Junior B	Solohead

=== Non-football clubs ===
Clubs who do not play hurling but are affiliated sister clubs (1)

- Lattin-Cullen (Aherlow football)

== Divisional Competitions ==
=== Legend ===
- Gold – County champions
- Silver – County runners-up

Competition	Year	Champions	Runners-up
Championship
West Tipperary Senior Hurling Championship	2026	Clonoulty-Rossmore	Cashel King Cormacs
West Tipperary Senior Football Championship	2026	Golden-Kilfeacle (Note: Golden-Kilfeacle were runners-up in the Tipperary Intermediate Football Championship. They competed in the West Tipperary Senior Football Championship due to there only being one senior football club in West Tipperary in 2026.)	Aherlow
West Tipperary Premier Intermediate Hurling Championship	2026	Éire Óg Annacarty	Golden-Kilfeacle
West Tipperary Intermediate Hurling Championship	2026	Arravale Rovers	Knockavilla-Donaskeigh Kickhams
West Tipperary Intermediate Football Championship	2020	Clonoulty-Rossmore	Cashel King Cormacs
West Tipperary Premier Junior Football Championship	2026	Seán Treacy's	Clonoulty-Rossmore
West Tipperary Junior A Hurling Championship	2026	Lattin-Cullen	Galtee Rovers
West Tipperary Junior A Football Championship	2026	Cappawhite	Knockavilla-Donaskeigh Kickhams
West Tipperary Junior B Hurling Championship	2026	Rosegreen	Golden-Kilfeacle
West Tipperary Junior B Football Championship	2026	Rosegreen	Solohead
West Tipperary Junior C Hurling Championship	2026	Arravale Rovers	Cashel King Cormacs
West Tipperary U21A Hurling Championship	2026	Golden-Kilfeacle	Cashel King Cormacs
West Tipperary U21B Hurling Championship	2026	Cappawhite Gaels (Note: Cappawhite Gaels is an amalgamation of Cappawhite and Solohead.)	Galtee Rovers
West Tipperary U21A Football Championship	2026	Golden-Kilfeacle	Arravale Rovers
West Tipperary U21B Football Championship	2026	Rosegreen / Clerihan	Knockavilla-Donaskeigh Kickhams
