= Cappawhite GAA =

Gaelic games club in County Tipperary, Ireland

Cappawhite
- Cheapach Na Baoiteach
- County: Tipperary
- Colours: White and Blue
- Grounds: Cappawhite GAA Grounds
- Coordinates: 52°34′42.90″N 8°09′54.35″W

Playing kits
Standard colours

Senior Club Championships
	All Ireland	Munster champions	Tipperary champions
Hurling:	-	-	1

Cappawhite GAA is a Gaelic Athletic Association club is located in the village of Cappawhite, County Tipperary, bordering on County Limerick in Ireland. It competes in the West Division Gaelic football and hurling competitions of Tipperary GAA. The club's tradition is in hurling, having won major honours through the decades. However, the club achieved major football success in the 1970s when the West Division Senior Football championship was also won.

Cappawhite full-back John Kelly was Tipperary's no.3 when they won the All-Ireland championship in 1971.

Cappawhite GAA are based at Franny Quinn Park on the Donohill Road. In recent times the grounds have been upgraded significantly boasting floodlights and a stand. The McGrath Cup game between Tipperary and Cork in January 2026 was hosted by Cappawhite GAA at Franny Quinn Park.

== Hurling ==
=== Honours ===
- Tipperary Senior Hurling Championship (1)
  - 1987
- Tipperary U-21 'A' Hurling Championship (1)
  - 1977 (with Éire Óg), 1999
- West Tipperary Senior Hurling Championship (8)
  - 1962, 1983, 1984, 1985, 1987, 2000, 2001, 2005
- Tipperary Junior A Hurling Championship (2)
  - 1942, 1948
- West Tipperary Junior A Hurling Championship (8)
  - 1942, 1948, 1957, 1961, 1982, 1985, 1988, 2006
- South Tipperary Junior A Hurling Championship (1)
  - 1913
- West Tipperary Junior B Hurling Championship (3)
  - 1997, 1998, 1999
- West Tipperary U-21 'A' Hurling Championship (12)
  - 1962 (with Éire Óg), 1965, 1968, 1974 (with Solohead), 1975 (with Solohead), 1977 (with Éire Óg), 1978 (with Éire Óg), 1980 (with Éire Óg), 1997, 1999, 2015 (with Sean Treacy's), 2016 (with Sean Treacy's)
- West Tipperary U-21 'B' Hurling Championship (4)
  - 1995, 2005, 2008, 2014 (with Sean Treacy's)
- West Tipperary Minor A Hurling Championship (10)
  - 1934, 1935, 1957 (with Éire Óg), 1962 (with Éire Óg), 1965, 1966, 1971, 1977 (with Éire Óg), 1978 (with Éire Óg), 1995
- West Tipperary Minor B Hurling Championship (2)
  - 2007, 2008

== Gaelic football ==
=== Honours ===
- Tipperary Intermediate Football Championship (1)
  - 1990
- Tipperary Junior Football Championship (2)
  - 1978, 2008
- West Tipperary Intermediate Football Championship (1)
  - 1990
- West Tipperary Junior Football Championship (5)
  - 1973, 1977, 2006, 2007, 2008
- West Tipperary Junior B Football Championship (1)
  - 2022
- West Tipperary Under-21 A Football Championship (1)
  - 1981 (with Éire Óg)
- West Tipperary Under-21 B Football Championship (1)
  - 1996
- West Tipperary Minor B Football Championship (4)
  - 1985, 1994, 1997, 2003

== Notable players ==
- John Kelly
- Ger O'Neill
- Eugene O'Neill (hurler)
- Thomas Costello (hurler)
