= Rosegreen =

Rosegreen Irish: Faiche Ró
- Village
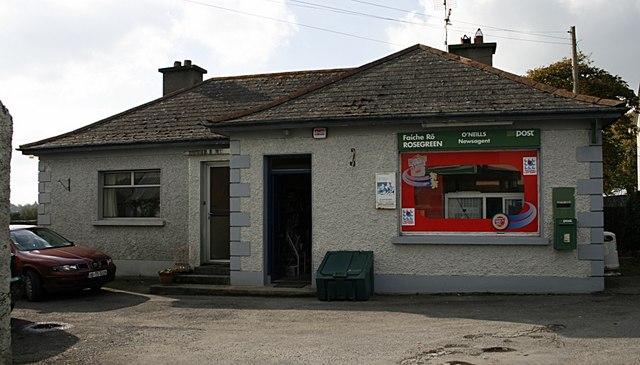
- Rosegreen Post Office

- Location in Ireland
- Coordinates: 52°28′08″N 7°49′44″W
- Country: Ireland
- Province: Munster
- County: County Tipperary
- Elevation: 140 m (460 ft)

Population (2016)
  - Total: 171
- Time zone: UTC+0 (WET)
  - Summer (DST): UTC-1 (IST (WEST))
- Irish Grid Reference: S115353

Rosegreen (Irish: Faiche Ró) is a village County Tipperary, Ireland. It is about 6.4 miles south of Cashel on the Cashel to Clonmel road. As of the 2016 census, the population was 171. The village is home to the Ballydoyle Stables, which is the horseracing training establishment of Vincent O'Brien. Rosegreen is in the barony of Middle Third.

== Name ==
The name Rosegreen is a corruption of Roe's Green. It was named after the landlord Andrew Roe, who died in 1722 and whose tomb lies in the village graveyard in the ruins of the old church. The older name for the village was Rathmacarthy (from Irish Ráth Mhic Cárthaigh 'MacCárthaigh's ringfort').

== Location and transport ==
The village is situated along the R688 regional road and has two major towns nearby, Clonmel is 17 kilometres south of Rosegreen and Cashel is 10.3 kilometres north of Rosegreen. The village has easy access to the M8 motorway north of the village and the closest airport to Rosegreen is Waterford Airport located 73 kilometres southwards.

== Sport ==
Rosegreen is home to Rosegreen GAA which is based in Páirc an Phobail. The club was founded in 1955 and the team colours are blue and white. The club declined in the 1960s due to emigration because of unemployment in the small rural village and as a result disbanded in 1970. However, a population increase in the late-1970s saw the team reform in 1981. The clubs is a part of Tipperary GAA and West Tipperary GAA.

== See also ==
- List of towns and villages in Ireland
