= Barry Grogan =

Irish Gaelic footballer

Personal information
- Born: 27 August 1986 (age 40) Aherlow, County Tipperary
- Height: 6 ft 0 in (183 cm)

Sport
- Sport: Gaelic Football
- Position: Full Forward
Club
- Years: Club
- 2003-2025: Aherlow
Club titles
- Tipperary titles: 2
Inter-county
- Years: County
- 2007-: Tipperary
Inter-county titles
- NFL: 1

Barry Grogan (born 27 August 1986) is an Irish Gaelic football player who plays at inter-county level for Tipperary, and plays his club football for Aherlow in West Tipperary. He has a distinguished football pedigree as his father Séamus Grogan of the neighbouring Galtee Rovers GAA Club in Bansha won County Senior Championship honours in the 1970s and 1980s and also played for the Tipperary senior team during that period.

== Career ==
Grogan played a key part as Aherlow claimed a historic first senior football championship success in 2006, and went on to claim a second title in 2010. He played at full-forward on the 2007 Tipperary Under 21 Football team and scored 3 goals against Cork in the 2007 Munster Under 21 Football Final. He made his championship debut at corner-forward in the 2007 Munster semi-final against Cork, scoring 2 points from play. In July 2010, in the All-Ireland Senior Football Championship 2010 against Dublin at Croke Park, Grogan scored 1-5 in a 1-13 to 1-21 defeat.

== Honours ==
- Tipperary Senior Football Championship (2)
  - 2006, 2010
- West Tipperary Senior Football Championship (5)
  - 2005, 2006, 2007, 2009, 2010, 2016, 2021
