= Ciarán McDonald (Tipperary Gaelic footballer) =

Irish Gaelic footballer

Personal information
- Native name: Ciarán Mac Dónaill (Irish)
- Born: County Tipperary, Ireland
- Height: 1.83 m (6 ft 0 in)

Sport
- Sport: Gaelic Football
- Position: Left Corner Back
Club
- Years: Club
- 2006-: Aherlow
Inter-county
- Years: County
- 2008-2017: Tipperary

Ciarán McDonald is an Irish Gaelic football player who previously played at inter-county level for Tipperary, and plays his club football for Aherlow in West Tipperary.

== Career ==
McDonald made his championship debut in 2008 against Limerick and captained Tipperary to win the 2010 Munster Under 21 Football title. He was named in the Ireland squad for the 2014 international rules test in Australia. On 21 August 2016, McDonald started for Tipperary as they were beaten in the All-Ireland semi-final by Mayo on a 2–13 to 0–14 scoreline, their first semi-final in 81 years.

In December 2017, McDonald announced his retirement from inter-county football due to injury at the age of 28.
