= Ger Maguire =

Irish hurler and Gaelic footballer

Personal information
- Native name: Gearóid Mag Uidhir (Irish)
- Born: 1973 (age 52–53) Cullen, County Tipperary, Ireland

Sport
- Sport: Hurling
- Position: Full-forward
Club
- Years: Club
- Lattin–Cullen
Club titles
- Tipperary titles: 0
Inter-county*
Years	County	Apps (scores)
1995-2000 1995-1997	Tipperary (hurling); Tipperary (football)	1 (0-00)
Inter-county titles
- Munster titles: 0
- All-Irelands: 0
- NHL: 1
- All Stars: 0
- *Inter County team apps and scores correct as of 19:33, 16 January 2015.

Ger Maguire (born 1973) is an Irish retired hurler and Gaelic footballer who play as a full-forward for the Tipperary senior teams.

Born in Cullen, County Tipperary, Maguire first arrived on the inter-county scene at the age of sixteen when he first linked up with the Tipperary minor team, before later joining the under-21 teams as a dual player as well as the junior and intermediate hurling sides. He joined the senior panels as a dual player during the 1995 championship. Maguire remained as a peripheral player on both teams for a number of seasons, winning one National Hurling League medal.

At club level Maguire is a one-time intermediate championship medallist with Lattin–Cullen.

In retirement from playing Maguire became involved in team management. He was an All-Ireland-winning selector with the Tipperary minor team in 2006, before later serving as a selector with the under-21 team.

== Honours ==
=== Player ===
Lattin–Cullen

- Tipperary Intermediate Hurling Championship (1): 1996

Tipperary

- National Hurling League (1): 1999

=== Selector ===
Tipperary

- All-Ireland Minor Hurling Championship (1): 2006
