= Mark Russell (hurler) =

Irish hurler

Personal information
- Born: County Tipperary, Ireland

Sport
- Sport: Hurling
- Position: Corner-forward
Club
- Years: Club
- Lattin–Cullen
Inter-county
- Years: County
- 2018 -: Tipperary

Mark Russell is an Irish hurler who played as a forward for the Tipperary senior team. He plays club hurling with Lattin–Cullen.

== Career ==
Russell made his senior debut for the Tipperary hurling team on 17 February 2018 in the third round of the 2018 National Hurling League against Wexford when he came on as a substitute in the second half.
