= Tipperary Intermediate Football Championship =

Annual Gaelic football competition

- Irish: Craobh Peile Idirmhéanach Thiobraid Árainn
- Founded: 1974
- Title holders: Ballina
- Most titles: Mullinahone, Grangemockler, Moyne-Templetuohy, Moycarkey-Borris, Drom-Inch (3 titles)

The Tipperary Intermediate Football Championship is an annual Gaelic football competition organised since 1974 by the Tipperary County Board of the Gaelic Athletic Association for the second-tier Gaelic football clubs in County Tipperary in Ireland. The series of games are played during the summer and autumn months with the county final usually being played in October. The championship has been played on a regional basis, whereby the respective champions from the Mid, North, South and West championships contested the county series of games. Now it is an all County 4 Group stage followed by knock out. The winning Club will receive the Barrett Cup.

The Tipperary County Championship is an integral part of the wider Munster Intermediate Club Football Championship. The winners of the Tipperary county final join the champions of the other Gaelic football counties to contest the provincial championship.

The title has been won at least once by 31 different clubs.

== Roll of honour ==
Wins	Team	Years won
3	Mullinahone	2000, 2006, 2011
3	Moyne-Templetuohy	1981, 2005, 2018
3	Moycarkey-Borris	1980, 2012, 2019
3	Drom-Inch	1975, 2014, 2021
3	Grangemockler	1991, 2003, 2023
2	Killenaule	2004, 2026
2	Aherlow	1995, 2024
2	Carrick Swans	1999, 2009
2	Knockavilla-Donaskeigh Kickhams	1996, 2002
2	Nenagh Éire Óg	1988, 1997
2	Ballyporeen	1992, 2013
2	Cahir	1979, 1998
2	Rockwell Rovers	1987, 2020
1	Thurles Sarsfields	2025
1	Ballina	2022
1	Kilsheelan-Kilcash	2010
1	Clonmel Óg	2008
1	Arravale Rovers	2007
1	Éire Óg Annacarty	2001
1	Borrisokane	1994
1	J. K. Bracken's	1993
1	Cappawhite	1990
1	Lattin-Cullen	1989
1	Clonoulty-Rossmore	1986
1	Newport	1985
1	Fr. Sheehy's	1984
1	Emly	1983
1	Golden-Kilfeacle	1982
1	Cashel King Cormacs	1976
1	Multeen Rovers	1974
1	Upperchurch-Drombane	2015
1	Fethard	2016
1	Kildangan	2017
