= Lattin–Cullen GAA =

Gaelic games club in County Tipperary, Ireland

- Laition–Cuileann
- Founded: 1949
- Colours: Green and White
- Grounds: Hannon GAA Park, Lattin East
- Coordinates: 52.463551°N 8.271692°W

Playing kits
Standard colours

Lattin–Cullen GAA is a Gaelic Athletic Association club which represents the parish villages of Lattin and Cullen in Ireland. The club plays at Hannon GAA Park (opened 2009) which is situated in the village of Lattin, and is an affiliate club of the West Tipperary GAA division. The club has traditionally has been one of the top three senior football clubs in the West Tipperary GAA Division. The club also plays hurling up to the Intermediate grade.

== Honours ==
- Tipperary Intermediate Hurling Championship – 1996
- West Tipperary Senior Hurling Champions – 1963 (as St Patrick's with Solohead)
- West Tipperary Intermediate Hurling Champions – 1983, 1996, 1999, 2014 (as Lattin–Cullen Gaels)
- Tipperary Intermediate Football Championship – 1989
- West Tipperary Senior Football Champions – 1958, 1961, 1964, 1965, 1966, 1967, 1969, 1971, 1982, 1994
- West Tipperary Intermediate Football Championship (2) 1989, 2003
- West Tipperary Junior A Football Championship (1) 1957
- Tipperary Junior A Hurling Championship (1) 1992
- West Tipperary Junior A Hurling Championship (7) 1952, 1963, 1968, 1979, 1989, 1992, 2007
- Tipperary Under-21 A Football Championship (2) 1982 (with Emly), 1985 (with Emly)
- West Tipperary Under-21 A Football Championship (11) 1961 (with Solohead), 1962 (with Solohead), 1963 (with Solohead), 1964 (with Solohead), 1967, 1982 (with Emly), 1983 (with Emly), 1984 (with Emly), 1985 (with Emly), 1986 (with Emly), 2014 (with Aherlow)
- West Tipperary Under-21 B Football Championship (2) 1992, 2003
- West Tipperary Under-21 C Football Championship (1) 2000
- West Tipperary Under-21 B Hurling Championship (2) 2002, 2015 (as Lattin–Cullen Gaels)
- Tipperary Under-21 C Hurling Championship (1) 2009
- West Tipperary Under-21 C Hurling Championship (2) 2000, 2006
- Tipperary Minor A Football Championship (3) 1963 (with Solohead) as St Patrick's), 1982 (with Emly), 1983 (with Emly)
- West Tipperary Minor A Football Championship (11) 1951 (with Emly), 1956 (with Emly), 1963 (with Solohead) as St Patrick's), 1968 (with Solohead) as St Patrick's), 1975 (with Emly), 1977 (with Emly), 1981 (with Emly), 1982 (with Emly), 1983 (with Emly), 1987 (with Emly), 2012 (with Aherlow)
- West Tipperary Minor B Football Championship (2) 1995, 2001
- West Tipperary Minor C Football Championship (3) 2003, 2006, 2007
- West Tipperary Minor A Hurling Championship (3) 1954 (with Emly), 1963 (with Solohead), 1983 (with Emly)
- West Tipperary Minor B Hurling Championship (1) 2000
- Tipperary Minor C Hurling Championship (1) 2008
- West Tipperary Minor C Hurling Championship (2) 2007, 2008

== Famous players ==
- Nicky English
- Ger Maguire
- Mark Russell
