= Emly GAA =

Gaelic games club in County Tipperary, Ireland

- Imleach
- Founded: 1886
- County: Tipperary
- Colours: Black and Amber
- Grounds: Saint Ailbe's Park
- Coordinates: 52.464704°N 8.347442°W

Playing kits
Standard colours

Senior Club Championships
	All Ireland	Munster champions	Tipperary champions
Hurling:	0	0	0

Emly GAA is a Gaelic Athletic Association club in Emly, County Tipperary, Ireland. Both hurling and Gaelic football are played at the club. The club is a part of West Tipperary GAA.

== History ==
It hosted some Munster championship games in the 1970s.They are a very successful club. P and T

== Honours ==
- Tipperary Junior A Football Championship Winners 1938, 1968, 2001
- Tipperary Junior A Hurling Championship Runner-Up 2008
- Tipperary Under-21 Football Championship Winners 1982, 1985 (both with Lattin-Cullen)
- Tipperary Minor A Football Championship Winners 1982, 1983 (both with Lattin-Cullen)
- Tipperary Minor C Football Championship Winner 2007
- West Tipperary Senior Football Championship Winners 1959, 1960, 1968 (as St. Ailbies with Aherlow), 1987
- West Tipperary Intermediate Hurling Championship Winners 1984, 1985
- West Tipperary Intermediate Football Championship Winners 1975, 1983
- West Tipperary Junior Hurling Hurling Championship Winners 2003, 2004, 2008, 2010, 2015 (with Galtee Rovers)
- West Tipperary Junior A Football Championship Winners 1936, 1937, 1938, 1939, 1948, 1956, 1968, 1999, 2001
- West Under-21 B Hurling Championship Winners 1987, 1988, 2019 (with Sean Treacys)
- South Tipperary Senior Hurling Championship Winner 1911 (as St. Ailbies)
- West Tipperary Under-21 A Football Championship 1960 (with Aherlow), 1982 (with Lattin-Cullen), 1983 (with Lattin-Cullen), 1984 (with Lattin-Cullen), 1985 (with Lattin-Cullen), 1986 (with Lattin-Cullen), 2015 (with Galtee Rovers)
- West Tipperary Under-21 B Football Championship (1) 2009
- West Tipperary Under-21 C Hurling Championship (1) 2001
- West Tipperary Minor A Football Championship (9) 1951 (with Lattin-Cullen), 1956 (with Lattin-Cullen), 1960 (with Aherlow), 1975 (with Lattin-Cullen), 1977 (with Lattin-Cullen), 1981 (with Lattin-Cullen), 1982 (with Lattin-Cullen), 1983 (with Lattin-Cullen), 1987 (with Lattin-Cullen)
- West Tipperary Minor B Football Championship (1) 2002
- West Tipperary Minor C Football Championship (1) 2007
- West Tipperary Minor A Hurling Championship (2) 1954 (with Lattin-Cullen), 1983 (with Lattin-Cullen)
- West Tipperary Minor B Hurling Championship (2) 2013 (with Sean Treacy's), 2014 (with Sean Treacy's)
