= John Leamy (hurler) =

Irish hurler

Personal information
- Native name: Seán Ó Léime (Irish)
- Born: 22 January 1964 (age 62) Cashel, County Tipperary, Ireland
- Height: 5 ft 11 in (180 cm)

Sport
- Sport: Hurling
- Position: Goalkeeper
Club
- Years: Club
- 1980–1995: Golden–Kilfeacle
Club titles
- Tipperary titles: 0
Inter-county*
Years	County	Apps (scores)
1981–1995	Tipperary	0 (0-00)
Inter-county titles
- Munster titles: 2
- All-Irelands: 1
- NHL: 0
- All Stars: 0
- *Inter County team apps and scores correct as of 13:45, 29 March 2018.

John Leamy (born 22 January 1964) is an Irish retired hurler. His league and championship career with the Tipperary senior team in the late eighties and early nineties saw him winning 2 Munster Senior Medals and 1 All Ireland.

Leamy first appeared for the Golden–Kilfeacle club at juvenile and underage levels, before eventually joining the club's adult team. After winning five divisional intermediate championship medals, he won a county intermediate championship medal in 1995.

Leamy made his debut on the inter-county scene when he was selected for the Tipperary minor team. He enjoyed two championship seasons with the minor team, culminating with the winning of an All-Ireland medal in 1982. Leamy subsequently joined the under-21 team, winning an All-Ireland medal in 1985 while also playing for the county junior team. He joined the senior team during the 1988 championship. Over the course of the next number of seasons Leamy was the second-choice goalkeeper and won an All-Ireland medal as a substitute in 1989. He also won two Munster medals. Leamy ended his inter-county career with the Tipperary intermediate team in 1995.

== Honours ==
Golden–Kilfeacle

- Tipperary Intermediate Hurling Championship: 1995

Tipperary

- All-Ireland Senior Hurling Championship: 1989
- Munster Senior Hurling Championship: 1987, 1988, 1989
- All-Ireland Junior Hurling Championship: 1991
- Munster Junior Hurling Championship: 1991
- All-Ireland Under-21 Hurling Championship: 1985
- Munster Under-21 Hurling Championship: 1984, 1985
- All-Ireland Minor Hurling Championship: 1982
- Munster Minor Hurling Championship: 1982
