= Rockwell Rovers GAA =

Gaelic games club in County Tipperary, Ireland

Rockwell Rovers
- Fánaithe Charn Tobair
- Founded: 1887
- County: Tipperary
- Colours: Blue and white
- Grounds: New Inn
- Coordinates: 52.443573°N 7.880502°W

Playing kits
Standard colours

Rockwell Rovers is a Gaelic Athletic Association hurling and gaelic football club located in the village of New Inn, County Tipperary, Ireland. The Rockwell GAA club was founded on 20 October 1887 and the scroll prescribing this is displayed in Rockwell College. The club was originally located in Rockwell College but moved to the village in 1932. The club is a part of West Tipperary GAA.The club came to national attention in 2009 when they took part in the second series of the reality TV programme Celebrity Bainisteoir, when they were managed by Tipperary model Andrea Roche.

== Honours ==
Rockwell Rovers won the 2020 County Tipperary Intermediate Football title beating Grangemockler/Ballyneale in Clonmel Sportsfield on a scoreline of 2-10 to 0-09. The club followed up this success winning the 2021 and 2022 Co Senior Tom Cusack Cup Championships beating the Aherlow Lattin Cullen combination 1-7 to 0-09 in the 2021 final, following up on victories over Arravale Rovers (3-13 to 0-10) in the quarter-final and Eire Og Annacarty Donohill in the semi-final (3-7 to 0-05). The 2022 side won the final comfortably against Killenaule 2-14 to 0-06, following up on a quarter final win against Ballyporeen of 2-16 to 0-14 and a semi final win over Eire Og Annacarty Donohill of 7-13 to 2-09. This was the club's 6th county title at adult level in 17 years, having also won county titles at Junior A football in 2005, Junior A hurling in 2011 and Junior B football in 2013 previously in the club's most successful era to date in both codes.

In hurling, a first ever West Intermediate Hurling Title was won in 2012 by beating Galtee Rovers in the quarter-final 0-13 to 2-6, Arravale Rovers in the semi-final 1-16 to 0-16 and then Sean Treacys in the final itself played in Dundrum by 2-12 to 1-10.

Junior A West Hurling Titles were won in 1939, 1950, 1967 and 2011 (beating Emly in Golden 2-12 to 0-9 in the 2011 final. This game was unusual in that Rockwell were already crowned County Champions by the time the West Final was played due to fixture hold-ups in the division that year.) The 2011 side won a historic County Junior A Hurling Title beating Moneygall in the county quarter final 1-6 to 0-6 in appalling weather conditions in Templemore, St Patricks/Drangan in the semi-final 2-10 to 0-10 played in the Clonmel Sportsfield and won the County final itself in Golden against Thurles Sarsfields 1-14 to 0-13, overturning a 5-point half time deficit (0-11 to 0-06). All but 2 points of Rockwell's total of 1-14 came from play in a memorable performance for the club.

The club also won West Junior B Hurling Titles in 1994 (v Solohead in Clonoulty), 1996 (v Cashel played in Bansha) and in 2002 (v Solohead played in Emly). Titles in this grade were also achieved in 1949 and in 1964.

In football, Rockwell won 5 Intermediate West Football Titles in a row between 2007 and 2011 inclusive, beating Arravale Rovers, Golden/Kilfeacle twice, Cappawhite and Emly in the finals. The club also won the 2013 title beating Cashel 0-16 to 2-06 in the final. The 2014 decider was won by beating Golden/Kilfeacle by a record margin of 28 points, 5-17 to 0-4. The club won the 2015 final beating Cashel again by 1-15 to 1-02 and the 2017 decider by beating Clonoulty/Rossmore 1-09 to 0-08. The club also won two O'Donoghue Cup Senior Football Titles during this period, again beating Golden/Kilfeacle and Arravale Rovers in the deciders. The club also won the West Intermediate Titles in 1979, 1981, 1984, 1987 and 1998. O'Donoghue Cups were also won in 1983 and 1984.

Rockwell Rovers won West Junior A Football Titles in 1951, 1960, 1963, 1967, 1972, 2002 (v Cappawhite) and 2005 (v Solohead) and won the County Junior A football title also in 1967 and 2005 (beating St Paticks Drangan 1-14 to 0-9 in the 2005 decider played in Gortnahue after beating Shannon Rovers in the county semi.)

The club's second string football side won West Junior B Football Titles in 2011 and 2013, beating Cashel on both occasions and the 2013 side also won the County Title v Clonmel Og in Cahir 1-10 to 0-06.

The club won West and County Under 21 Football Titles in 1987 (v Ardfinnan in Cahir after a replay) and 2010 (v Mullinahone in Fethard), as well as West and County Intermediate Football Titles in 1987 (v Borrisokane played in Littleton). West Under 21 Football Titles were also won in 1961, 1971, 1989, 1994, 2005, 2006, 2008,2014 and 2015.

A west under 21 A hurling title was annexed in 1960 and west under 21 c titles were won in 2002 and 2009.

A West Senior Football Title was also won in 1980 amalgamated with Golden Kilfeacle.

County Juvenile Hurling and Football Titles were won in 1955 (the hurlers beating a fancied Toomevara side in the final) and the footballers repeated the feat in 1956 for good measure.

The club continues to compete strongly in both hurling and football and is one of very few clubs in Tipperary to win County Titles in both codes and adult level in recent years.

=== List of Honours ===
- Co Tipperary Senior Football Tom Cusack Cup (2) 2021, 2022
- West Tipperary Senior Football Championship (1) 1980 (with Golden-Kilfeacle)
- Tipperary Intermediate Football Championship (2) 1987, 2020
- West Tipperary Intermediate Football Championship (14) 1979, 1981, 1984, 1987, 1998, 2007, 2008, 2009, 2010, 2011, 2013, 2014, 2015, 2017
- West Tipperary Intermediate Hurling Championship (1) 2012
- Tipperary Junior A Football Championship (2) 1963, 2005
- West Tipperary Junior A Football Championship (7) 1951, 1960, 1963, 1967, 1972, 2002, 2005
- Tipperary Junior B Football Championship (1) 2013
- West Tipperary Junior B Football Championship (2) 2011, 2013
- Tipperary Junior A Hurling Championship (1) 2011
- West Tipperary Junior A Hurling Championship (3) 1950, 1967, 2011
- West Tipperary Junior B Hurling Championship (3) 1994, 1996, 2002
- West Tipperary Under-21 A Football Championship (2) 1969, 1970
- Tipperary Under-21 B Football Championship (2) 1987, 2010
- West Tipperary Under-21 B Football Championship (9) 1987, 1989, 1994, 2005, 2006, 2008, 2010, 2014 (with Rosegreen), 2015 (with Rosegreen)
- West Tipperary Under-21 A Hurling Championship (1) 1960
- West Tipperary Under-21 C Hurling Championship (2) 2002, 2009
- West Tipperary Minor A Football Championship (1) 1958
- West Tipperary Minor B Football Championship (1) 2013 (with Rosegreen)
- Tipperary Minor C Football Championship (1) 1999
- West Tipperary Minor C Football Championship (1) 1999
- West Tipperary Minor C Hurling Championship (2) 2000, 2002
