= Solohead GAA =

Gaelic games club in County Tipperary, Ireland

- Sulchóid
- County: Tipperary
- Colours: Green and Red
- Grounds: Solohead
- Coordinates: 52.5109°N 8.2122°W

Playing kits
Standard colours

Solohead GAA is a Gaelic Athletic Association hurling and gaelic football club located in Solohead, in West County Tipperary in Ireland. The club is located north of Tipperary Town. The club is part of West Tipperary GAA.

== Honours ==
- West Tipperary Senior Football Championship:
  - Winner (4): 1956, 1957, 1970, 1977
- West Tipperary Senior Hurling Championship
  - Winner (2): 1957 (St. Nicholas -included Glengar, Cappa & Solohead), 1963 (as St. Patrick's included Solohead & Lattin-Cullen)
- West Tipperary Intermediate Hurling Championship:
  - Winner (3): 1979, 1981, 1987
- West Tipperary Junior A Football Championship:
  - Winner (4): 1954, 1955, 1966, 1998
- Tipperary Junior B Football Championship :
  - Winner (1): 2018
- West Tipperary Junior B Football Championship:
  - Winner (2): 1996, 2018
- Tipperary Junior A Hurling Championship:
  - Winner (2): 1938, 1959
- West Tipperary Junior A Hurling Championship:
  - Winner (7): 1938, 1949, 1953, 1955, 1959, 1970, 1975
- West Tipperary Junior B Hurling Championship:
  - Winner 2006, 2022
- West Tipperary Under-21 A Football Championship:
  - Winner 1961 (with Lattin-Cullen), 1962 (with Lattin-Cullen), 1963 (with Lattin-Cullen), 1964 (with Lattin-Cullen), 1965, 1966, 1968
- Tipperary Under-21 C Football Championship:
  - Winner 2004
- West Tipperary Under-21 C Football Championship:
  - Winner 2001
- South Tipperary Junior A Hurling Championship:
  - Winner (2): 1925, 1926 (with Arravale Rovers)
