= Aherlow GAA =

Gaelic games club in County Tipperary, Ireland

- Eatharlach
- Founded: 1885
- County: Tipperary
- Colours: Green and gold
- Grounds: O'Gorman Park
- Coordinates: 52.4110°N 8.2258°W

Playing kits
Standard colours

Senior Club Championships
	All Ireland	Munster champions	Tipperary champions
Football:	-	-	2

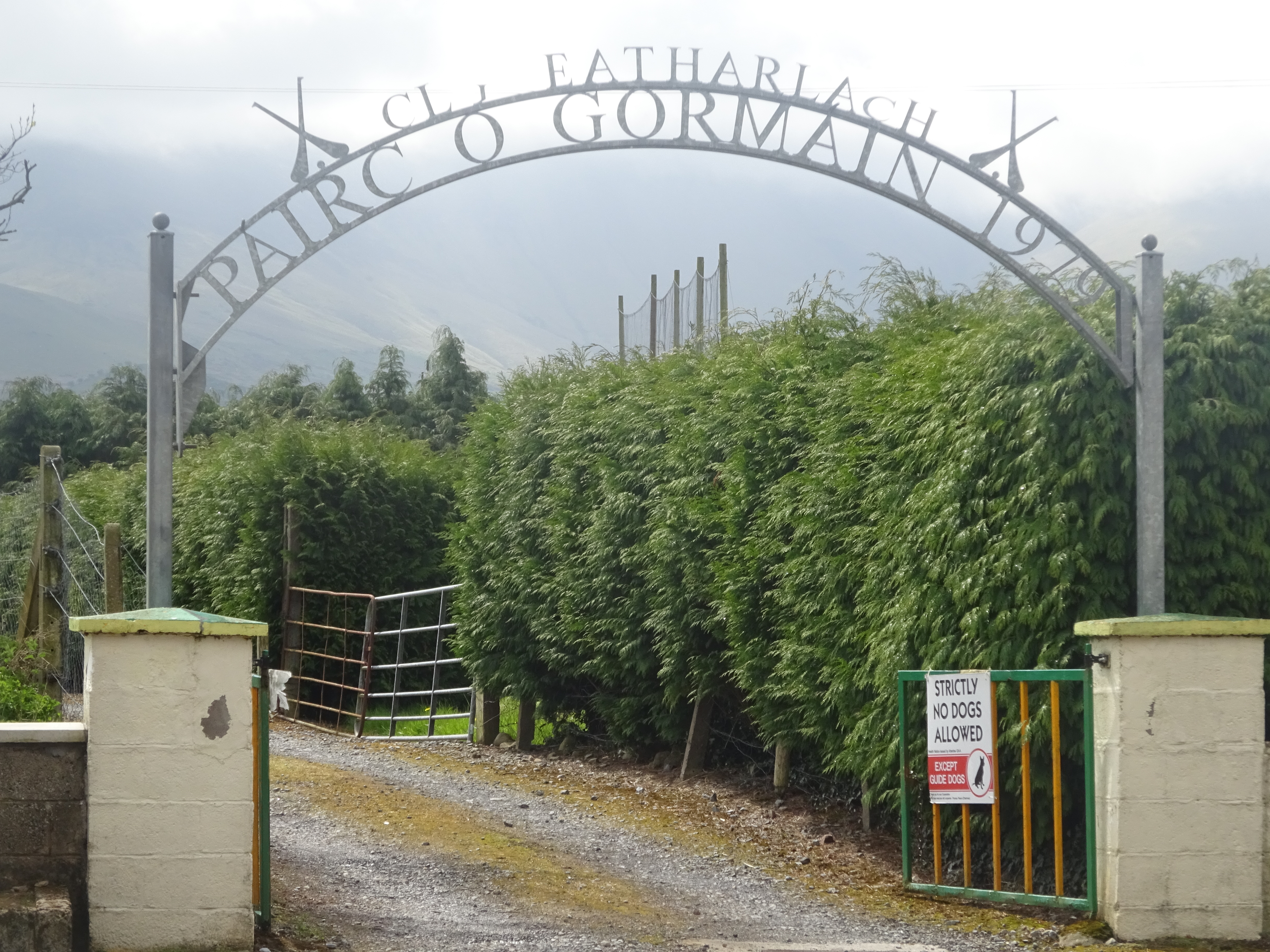
Entrance to O'Gorman Park, Lisvarrinane

Aherlow GAA is a Gaelic Athletic Association club located in County Tipperary in Ireland, established in 1885, within a year of the GAA's foundation. The club plays Gaelic football at senior (in a combination with a neighbouring club), under-21, junior, minor and underage levels in the West Tipperary Division and all-county competitions of Tipperary GAA. The club also fields hurling teams, and plays Ladies' Gaelic football. The club is centred on the village of Lisvernane and surrounding Glen of Aherlow, approximately eight miles east of Tipperary town. Club players, who have played for the Tipperary senior football team, have included Ciarán McDonald and Barry Grogan. The club has joined forces with the intermediate football team Lattin-Cullen GAA for the senior football championship. This combination team, known as Aherlow Gaels, won the 2016 West Tipperary divisional title by defeating Galtee Rovers.

== Gaelic football ==
The club's first county title was won at under-21 level in 1992. Footage of the match reputedly became "Ireland's first viral sensation" due to the "colourful commentary" in the recording. Described in a 2021 Irish Examiner article as "probably the most-watched club match in GAA history", copies and recreations of the recording were shown in Irish pubs "all over the world".

At senior level, the club has been Tipperary Senior Football champions on two occasions. They won their first county title in 2006 and went on to win their second title in November 2010 after a 2–4 to 1–6 win against Loughmore-Castleiney in the final at Semple Stadium.

=== Honours ===
- Tipperary Senior Football Championship (2): 2006, 2010
- West Tipperary Senior Football Championship (8): 1968 (as St. Ailbie's with Emly), 1997, 2005, 2006, 2007, 2009, 2010, 2016 (as Aherlow Gaels with Lattin-Cullen) 2021.
- Tipperary Intermediate Football Championship (2): 1995, 2024
- West Tipperary Intermediate Football Championship (6): 1978, 1980, 1992, 1994, 1995, 2023
- Tipperary Under-21 Football Championship (3): 1992, 1995, 1996
- West Tipperary Under-21 Football Championship (11): 1960 (with Emly), 1991, 1992, 1993, 1995, 1996, 1997, 2006, 2007, 2008, 2014 (with Lattin-Cullen)
- Tipperary Under-21 C Football Championship (1): 2003
- Tipperary Minor A Football Championship (1): 1994
- Tipperary Minor B Football Championship (2): 1988, 1989
- Tipperary Minor C Football Championship (1): 2002

=== Notable players ===
- Barry Grogan
- Ciarán McDonald

== Ladies' Gaelic football ==
Aherlow Ladies had their most successful year to date in 2011, winning county and provincial titles and reaching the All-Ireland final.

=== Honours ===
- All-Ireland Junior Ladies' Club Football Championship (0): (runners-up in 2011)
- Munster Junior Ladies' Club Football Championship (1): 2011
- Tipperary Ladies' Football Championship (1): 2011
- Tipperary Ladies Senior Football Championship (2): 2019 2021

== Hurling ==
Although Aherlow was long a mainly-football club, since the 1990s, the club has had some successes in hurling. It won the county Junior Championship in 2009, and the Intermediate title in 2011.

=== Honours ===
- Tipperary Intermediate Hurling Championship (1): 2011
- Tipperary Junior Hurling Championship (1): 2009
- Tipperary Under-21 B Hurling Championship (3): 1990 (with Sean Treacy's), 1992, 2009
- West Tipperary Under-21 B Hurling Championship (4): 1990 (with Sean Treacy's), 1992, 1996, 2009
