= Éire Óg Annacarty GAA =

Gaelic games club in County Tipperary, Ireland

Éire Óg Annacarty
- Éire Óg Áth na Cairte
- County: Tipperary
- Colours: Blue and White
- Grounds: Anacarty sports hall and soccer pitch
- Coordinates: 52°33′53.85″N 8°06′35.30″W

Playing kits
Standard colours

Éire Óg Annacarty GAA club is a Gaelic Athletic Association club in the parish of Anacarty & Donohill, in west County Tipperary in Ireland. The club is a part of West Tipperary GAA.

== History ==
The Éire Óg club's most notable player of the modern era is Pat Fox, All-Ireland medallist for senior hurling in 1989 and 1991 during which period he was a leading scorer in the All-Ireland and Munster Championships. The Club is predominantly a hurling club and has won the West Tipperary Senior Hurling Championship on many occasions including four years in succession from 1941 to 1944. During which period also, the club were Tipperary Senior Hurling Championship winners in 1943 when they defeated Moycarkey-Borris in the final under the captaincy of Tom Ryan. Éire Óg, thus became the first club since the foundation of the West Division in 1930 to win the championship, though a western team - Clonoulty - had a victory in 1888, long before the formation of the Division.

A prominent player of the 1940s was William (Bill) O'Donnell, winner of the All-Ireland Senior Hurling Championship with Tipperary in 1937, when the final was played in Fitzgerald Stadium, Killarney as Croke Park was temporarily out of commission while the old Cusack Stand was under construction. O'Donnell was a native of Golden and in his early playing days competed with the Golden Fontenoys before transferring his allegiance to Éire Óg on his appointment as Principal Teacher in Annacarty National School. He was also a referee of note in the 1940s and took charge of many important engagements in the inter-county arena, especially in Munster. Overall, the club has won the premier competition in which it competes, the West Tipperary Senior hurling Championship on 9 occasions in 1941,42,43,44,64,67,81,86,2013,14,15. While also sharing honours in combination teams to be victorious in 1961 as St. Vincent's (Cappawhite-Éire Óg) and more recently in 2004 as Éire Óg- Golden, which at the time of their victory was colloquially known as "The Combo" in recognition of their coalition with the Golden-Kilfeacle club.

The club also plays in the divisional football championships of West Tipperary and in 2006, achieved senior status, and thus became the only club to contest the senior championships of West Tipperary in both hurling and football in the years 2007 to 2011. The football team played their part in local GAA history in 2008 when they took part in the first West Tipperary divisional senior final to be played under flood lights when they opposed Galtee Rovers at Cappawhite. The team lost this match. They won West Championship for the first time when they defeated the reigning champions Arravale Rovers in the final played at Lattin on Sunday, 14 October, by a score line 1-9 to 1-7.

Éire Óg claimed further honours in 2013 when the senior hurling team won the West Tipperary Senior Hurling championship, defeating Clonoulty-Rossmore in the final. Their opponents had been champions for a record six consecutive seasons (2007 to 2012). The club grounds are in Annacarty village, about seven miles from Cashel.

=== Notable players ===
- Brian Fox

== Honours ==
- Tipperary Senior Hurling Championship Winners (1) 1943 Runners-Up 1941
- Tipperary Intermediate Hurling Championship Winners (2) 1994, 2006
- West Tipperary Senior Hurling Championship Winners 1941, 1942, 1943, 1944, 1964, 1967, 1981, 1986, 2013, 2014, 2015
- West Tipperary Senior Football Championship (2) 2012, 2023
- Tipperary Intermediate Football Championship (1) 2001
- West Tipperary Intermediate Football Championship (5) 1988, 1997, 1999, 2000, 2001
- West Tipperary Intermediate Hurling Championship (4) 1994, 2002, 2004, 2006
- Tipperary Junior A Football Championship (1) 2010
- West Tipperary Junior A Football Championship (3) 1962, 1964, 2010
- Tipperary Junior B Football Championship (1) 2001
- West Tipperary Junior B Football Championship (3) 2000, 2001, 2014
- Tipperary Junior A Hurling Championship (1) 1977
- West Tipperary Junior A Hurling Championship (5) 1937, 1960, 1962, 1976, 1977
- Tipperary Junior B Hurling Championship (1) 2015
- West Tipperary Junior B Hurling Championship (3) 2001, 2005, 2015
- West Tipperary Under-21 A Football Championship (1) 1981 (with Cappawhite)
- West Tipperary Under-21 B Football Championship (2) 1998, 2009
- Tipperary Under-21 C Football Championship (1) 2006
- West Tipperary Under-21 C Football Championship (2) 2005, 2006
- Tipperary Under-21 A Hurling Championship (1) 1977 (with Cappawhite)
- West Tipperary Under-21 A Hurling Championship (7) 1962 (with Cappawhite), 1972 (with Clonoulty-Rossmore), 1973 (with Clonoulty-Rossmore), 1977 (with Cappawhite), 1978 (with Cappawhite), 1980 (with Cappawhite), 2001
- West Tipperary Under-21 (B) Hurling Championship (5) 1999, 2000, 2003, 2006, 2013
- Tipperary Minor (B) Football Championship (1) 1998
- West Tipperary Minor (B) Football Championship (2) 1986 (with Solohead), 1998
- Tipperary Minor (C) Football Championship (1) 2005
- West Tipperary Minor (C) Football Championship (1) 2005
- West Tipperary Minor (A) Hurling Championship (5) 1957 (with Cappawhite), 1962 (with Cappawhite), 1977 (with Cappawhite), 1978 (with Cappawhite), 2013 (with Galtee Rovers)
- West Tipperary Minor (B) Hurling Championship (3) 1988, 1998, 2006
- West Tipperary Minor (C) Hurling Championship (1) 2004
