= Golden–Kilfeacle GAA =

Gaelic games club in County Tipperary, Ireland

Golden–Kilfeacle
- An Gabhailín–Cill Fiachaill
- County: Tipperary
- Colours: Green and White
- Grounds: Golden
- Coordinates: 52°30′01.43″N 7°58′37.20″W

Playing kits
Standard colours

Golden–Kilfeacle GAA club is located in the parish of Golden, five miles from Cashel in County Tipperary, Ireland. The club plays hurling and Gaelic football and is one of the few clubs in West Tipperary to win both the West Tipperary Senior Hurling and Football Championships. The club was known in the past as the Golden Fontenoys, named in memory of the Franco-Irish army soldiers who took the field at the Battle of Fontenoy in 1745. Inter-county player William "Bill" O'Donnell played with the Fontenoys in the 1930s. He later transferred to Éire Óg Annacarty, where he was headmaster of the school in Annacarty. O'Donnell was a member of the Tipperary team that won the All-Ireland Senior Hurling Championship in 1937 when the final was played in Killarney.

Other inter-county players include Joe Fogarty in the 1960s, Ned O'Donnell in the 1970s, John Looby who was a minor of inter-county fame in the same decade. In more recent times, Shane O' Connell played Senior football for Tipperary many years, as well as Josh Keane who was a dual star for Tipperary, where he played U21 hurling and Senior football in the same year. Jack Leamy also made his debut with the Tipperary senior hurlers in 2026 in a National Hurling League game against Galway. Many players in recent years have represented Tipperary underage at minor and U20 level in both codes, such as Niall Heffernan, Ben Currivan, Eanna Ormond, Ciaran Byrne, Eoin Marnane, Charlie Hall, Sam Hall, James Finn and Jack Donnelly. Ben Currivan captained Tipperary to a U20 Munster Final Hurling success in 2024. Niall Heffernan started wing back in an U20 All Ireland Final win over Cork in 2019.

== Achievements ==
- West Tipperary Senior Football Championship (7) 1980 (with Rockwell Rovers), 1986, 1988, 1995, 1996, 2024, 2026
- West Tipperary Senior Hurling Championship (3) 1969, 1972, 2004 (with Éire Óg Annacarty)
- Tipperary Intermediate Football Championship (1) 1982
- West Tipperary Intermediate Football Championship (6) 1977, 1982, 2016, 2019, 2022, 2025
- Tipperary Intermediate Hurling Championship (2) 1995, 2025
- West Tipperary Intermediate Hurling Championship (6) 1980, 1982, 1990, 1995, 2019, 2024
- Tipperary Junior A Football Championship (2) 1979, 2015
- West Tipperary Junior A Football Championship (6) 1940 (as Golden), 1961, 1975, 1976, 1979, 2015
- Tipperary Junior B Football Championship (2) 2010, 2025
- West Tipperary Junior B Football Championship (3) 1995, 2010, 2025
- West Tipperary Junior A Hurling Championship (5) 1935 (as Golden), 1943 (as Golden), 1954, 1965, 1978
- South Tipperary Junior A Hurling Championship (1) 1918 (as Golden)
- West Tipperary Junior B Hurling Championship (3) 2009, 2013, 2019
- West Tipperary Junior C Hurling Championship (1) 2025
- West Tipperary Under-21 A Football Championship (1) 1998
- Tipperary Under-21 B Football Championship (2) 1995, 2007
- West Tipperary Under-21 B Football Championship (7) 1993, 1995, 2001, 2007, 2011, 2016, 2023
- Tipperary Under-21 A Hurling Championship (1) 1998
- West Tipperary Under-21 A Hurling Championship (5) 1969 (with Galtee Rovers) as Suir Rovers), 1987, 1998, 2025, 2026
- West Tipperary Under-21 B Hurling Championship (5) 1994, 2001, 2007, 2012, 2022
- West Tipperary Under-19 A Football Championship (1) 2024
- Tipperary Under-19 B Football Championship (1) 2025
- West Tipperary Under-19 B Football Championship (1) 2025
- Tipperary Minor A Football Championship (1) 2016 (with Galtee Rovers)
- West Tipperary Minor A Football Championship (10) 1952 (with Galtee Rovers), 1961 (with Galtee Rovers), 1962 (with Galtee Rovers), 1984, 1985, 1995, 1996, 2011, 2015 (with Galtee Rovers), 2016 (with Galtee Rovers)
- West Tipperary Minor B Football Championship (8) 1987, 1990, 1993, 1999, 2007, 2009, 2010, 2014
- West Tipperary Minor A Hurling Championship (6) 1936 (as Golden), 1941 (with Kickhams as Invincibles), 1948, 1967, 1969, 1997
- West Tipperary Minor B Hurling Championship (7) 1986, 1987, 1992, 2003, 2009, 2010, 2026
- Tipperary Under-17 B Football Championship (1) 2021
- West Tipperary Under-17 A Hurling Championship (1) 2022
- West Tipperary Under-17 B Hurling Championship (1) 2024

== Notable players ==
- John Leamy
- Josh Keane
- Bill O'Donnell
- Jack Leamy
- James Finn
