= Galtee Rovers GAA =

Gaelic games club in County Tipperary, Ireland

Galtee Rovers
- Fánaithe na nGailte
- Founded: 1885
- County: Tipperary
- Colours: Red and White
- Grounds: Canon Hayes Park, Bansha
- Coordinates: 52°26′49.37″N 8°03′58.51″W

Playing kits
Standard colours

Senior Club Championships
	All Ireland	Munster champions	Tipperary champions
Football:	-	-	6

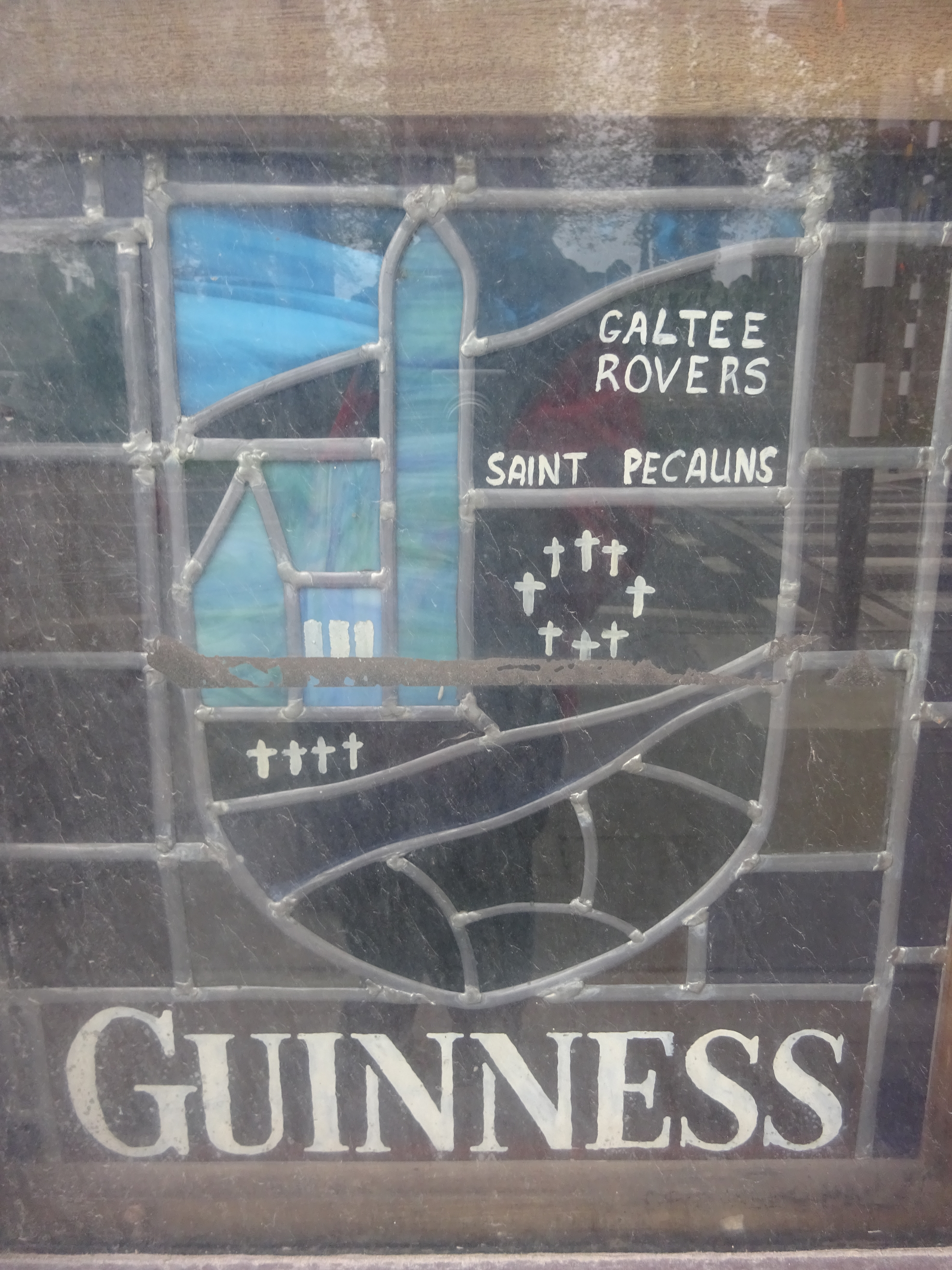
Galtee Rovers crest depicted in a pub window, Bansha

Galtee Rovers—St. Pecaun's is a Gaelic Athletic Association club located in the village of Bansha on the National Primary Route N24 in the shadow of the Galtee Mountains in west County Tipperary, Ireland. The club, founded in 1885, represents the parish of Bansha & Kilmoyler and enters gaelic football and hurling teams in the West Tipperary and Tipperary championships. The club grounds – Canon Hayes Park – are named in honour of the founder of Muntir na Tíre, Very Rev. John Canon Hayes, Parish Priest of Bansha & Kilmoyler (1946–57), who was patron of the club during his pastorship. The club pavilion is named 'The McGrath Centre' in honour of two club members, the late John & Geraldine McGrath who died on New Year's Day, 1 January 2000. John Moloney, referee of six All-Ireland Senior Finals, was President of the Galtee Rovers Club at the time of his death on 6 October 2006. In addition to his work at national level in the Gaelic Athletic Association, at club level he coached and organised the juvenile and under-age players for nearly 50 years.

Galtee Rovers is a traditional football club, however in modern times it has enjoyed a hurling renaissance from the late 1990s through the early years of the 21st century. The club was one of the few dual (hurling and football) senior clubs for five years from 2001 to 2006. However, it lost its senior hurling status after defeat in the West Divisional and County championships in 2006. The club's main focus at senior level for the immediate future is expected to be in football, while continuing to compete in the Intermediate hurling championship. The club's endeavours in football were rewarded in 2008 when Rovers regained the County Tipperary Senior Football Championship after an interval of 27 years by defeating neighbouring Cahir, 0-7 to 0-5 in the final played at Cashel on Sunday, 26 October 2008.

In 2003, the club won all six major championships in West Tipperary, i.e., Senior Hurling & Football; Under-21(grade A) Hurling & Football and Minor (grade A) Hurling & Football.

== Honours ==
=== Football ===
- Tipperary Senior Football Championship Winners: (6): 1949, 1950, 1976, 1980, 1981, 2008.
- Tipperary Junior Football Championship Winners (1): 1946
- Tipperary Minor Football Championship Winners (1): 1998, 2016 (with Golden)2022.
- South Tipperary Senior Football Championship Winners (2): 1912, 1915
- West Tipperary Senior Football Championship Winners (26): 1947, 1949, 1950, 1951, 1952, 1953, 1954, 1962, 1963, 1974, 1975, 1976, 1979, 1983, 1985, 1989, 1991, 1999, 2000, 2001, 2002, 2003, 2004, 2008, 2014, 2018.
- West Tipperary Senior Football League (O'Donoghue Cup) Winners (8): 1973, 1977, 1978, 1980, 1990, 1994, 1995, 2005.
- West Tipperary Junior Football (A) Championship Winners (5): 1935, 1941, 1943, 1946, 1959.
- Tipperary Junior B Football Championship Winners 2007
- West Tipperary Junior Football (B) Championship Winners (6): 1997, 1998, 2002, 2004, 2007, 2015.
- West Tipperary Minor (A) Football Championship Winners (7): 1953, 1961 (with Golden), 1962 (with Golden), 1993, 1998, 2001, 2003, 2014, 2015 (with Golden), 2016 (with Golden)2022
- Tipperary Under-21 (A) Football Championship (1) 1975
- West Tipperary Under-21 (A) Football Championship (11) 1974, 1975, 1976, 1978, 1999, 2000, 2001, 2002, 2003, 2004, 2015 (with Emly)
- West Tipperary Under-21 (B) Football Championship (1) 1988 2022
- ‘’’West u19 Football Championship’’’ 2022
- ‘’’County u19 B Football Champions’’’ 2022

=== Hurling ===
- Tipperary Intermediate Hurling Championship Winners (1): 2001.
- Tipperary Intermediate Hurling League Winners (1): 2007.
- Tipperary Junior A Hurling Championship Winners (1): 1999.
- West Tipperary Senior Hurling Championship Winners (1): 2003
- West Tipperary Intermediate Hurling Championship Winners (6): 2000, 2001, 2007, 2008, 2009, 2010
- West Tipperary Junior (A) Hurling Championship Winners (9): 1940, 1946, 1960, 1969, 1971, 1973, 1980, 1997, 1999,2021
- West Tipperary Junior (B) Hurling Championship Winners (1): 2000.
- South Tipperary Senior Hurling Championship Winners (1) : 1923
- West Tipperary Under-21 (A) Hurling Championship (3) 2002, 2003, 2004
- West Tipperary Under-21 (B) Hurling Championship (1) 1998
- West Tipperary Under-21 (C) Hurling Championship (1) 2019
- West Tipperary Minor (A) Hurling Championship (3) 2001, 2003, 2013 (with Éire Óg Annacarty)
- West Tipperary Minor (B) Hurling Championship (4) 1985, 1993, 1997, 1999

== Early history ==
The Galtee Rovers Club was first affiliated to the Tipperary County Board of the GAA in 1885. The current parish club was preceded in earlier times by Bansha, St. Pecaun's and Kilmoyler. The latter won the South Tipperary Senior Hurling Championship in 1923. For most of its existence, the club was known as Galtee Rovers and this name can be found in the annals of the period 1899/1900. A hiatus occurred in the 1940s when a team was formed in Kilmoyler which competed in the West Tipperary junior football championship for a few seasons, however a closing of ranks took place in time for the 1946 championships when, for one season only, the club was named Galteee Rovers - St. Pecaun. In 1947, the club restored its ancient name of Galtee Rovers while adopting St. Pecaun of Toureen as its Patron and Protector, a solution which has endured since then.

One of the club leaders in its formative years in the 1880s was Mr. John Cullinane, M.P. who was a native of Bansha and represented County Tipperary as a Nationalist member of Parliament at Westminster from 1900 to 1918. Mr. Cullinane refereed the first All-Ireland Senior Football Final at Clonskeagh, Dublin between the Limerick Commercials and the Dundalk Young Irelands of Louth in 1887 and was the advance agent for the GAA's first international tour to the US in 1888, which subsequently became known as the 'American Invasion'.

Another native of the village, Thomas St. George McCarthy (1862–1943), a police officer, was one of the Co-founders of the Gaelic Athletic Association. He was one of the four Tipperary men who were among the seven who attended the inaugural meeting of the Association at Hayes' Hotel, Thurles on 1 November 1884. He was educated at Tipperary Grammar School (The Abbey School), Tipperary Town where he learned the rudiments of rugby football. He moved to Dublin in 1877 and became a friend of Michael Cusack, who had a cramming school. He was coached by Cusack for a Royal Irish Constabulary (RIC) cadetship examination in 1882, in which he took first place. In 1881, he joined Trinity College Rugby Club and in January 1882, he played rugby for Ireland against Wales, thus becoming Bansha's first Rugby International player – the second Bansha native to gain international honours was Pierce O'Brien-Butler of Bansha Castle who played with Monkstown in South Dublin and won 6 caps from 1897 to 1902 before departing for the Boer war where he died of an illness. Later in 1882, McCarthy won a Leinster Senior Cup medal with Dublin University (Trinity) Rugby Club. It is supposed that his friendship with Michael Cusack led to his presence at the inaugural meeting of the Association. At the time, he was a District Inspector of the RIC, based in nearby Templemore. He took a less prominent part in the affairs of the Association thereafter, although he was a frequent attender at Croke Park to where he travelled from his home in the Dublin suburb of Ranelagh where he lived. He died in 1943 and is buried in Dean's Grange Cemetery in South Dublin, though his sister, Kathleen McCarthy, is interred in the old village graveyard in Bansha. A graveside monument was raised in his honour by the Association in recent years at which representatives of the police forces, north and south of the Irish border were present as a reconciliatory gesture in a sporting context.

In the past, Thomas was often mistaken as being a native of County Kerry. This was due to his name being near identical with that of his father, George McCarthy (1832–1902), Lieutenant of the Revenue Police, County Inspector of the RIC and a resident magistrate who was from County Kerry, though working in County Tipperary and residing in Bansha village, where his son was born and grew up.

== Bibliography ==
- The Complete Handbook of Gaelic Games (2005), Editor Des Donegan
