= 2025 Tipperary Senior Football Championship =

- Dates: 15 August 2025 - 8 November 2025
- Teams: 14
- Sponsor: FBD Insurance
- Champions: Clonmel Commercials (22nd title); Séamus Kennedy (captain); Tommy Morrissey (manager)
- Runners-up: Kilsheelan–Kilcash; Kian Quinn and Mark Stokes (captain); Keith O'Brien (manager)
- Relegated: Arravale Rovers; Cahir; Killenaule

Tournament statistics
- Matches played: 28
- Goals scored: 67 (2.39 per match)
- Points scored: 697 (24.89 per match)
- Top scorer(s): Sean O'Connor (4-25)

The 2025 Tipperary Senior Football Championship is the 133rd staging of the Tipperary Senior Football Championship since its establishment by the Tipperary County Board in 1887.

The defending champions were Loughmore–Castleiney. They were defeated at the semi-final stage by Kilsheelan–Kilcash. Clonmel Commercials defeated Kilsheelan–Kilcash in the final to win the championship for a record 22nd time.

== Team changes ==
=== To Championship ===
Promoted from the Tipperary Intermediate Football Championship

- Aherlow

== Group stage ==
The draw for the group stage took place on 27 March 2025.

Advance to quarter-finals Advance to relegation play-offs

=== Group 1 ===
Team	Matches				Score			Pts
Team	Pld	W	D	L	For	Against	Diff	Pts
Kilsheelan–Kilcash	3	2	0	1	9-40	3-43	+15	4
Aherlow	3	1	1	1	3-43	6-40	-6	3
Ballyporeen	3	1	1	1	3-39	1-40	+5	3
Cahir	3	0	2	1	2-43	7-41	-14	2

==== Results ====
17 August 2025 Round 1	Kilsheelan–Kilcash	5-17 – 1-15	Cahir	Fethard
13:30	Mikey McGuire 2-1, Jamie Roche 1-4 (1tps, 1f), Shane Garland 1-2 (1tps), Zac O'Loughlin 1-0, Senan Butler (1tps) and Micheal Freaney (1tps) 0-3 each, Billy O'Connor and Tommy O'Connor 0-2 each		Conor O'Brien 0-7 (2tps, 3f), Ciaran Condon 1-0, Jesse Kiely, Kevin Grogan (1 45') and Craig Guiry (1tps) 0-2 each, Jakie Kiely and Ger Quinn 0-1 each	Referee: Brian Tyrell

17 August 2025 Round 1	Ballyporeen	1-12 – 1-18	Aherlow	Clonmel
15:30	Sam McGrath 1-2, Darragh Brennan (1tps, 1f) and Conor Sweeney (2f) 0-3 each, Charlie English, Dean Finn, Eoin Morrissey and John Martin 0-1 each		Liam Carew 1-9 (0-3f, 1tps), Micheal Elligott 0-5 (1tps), Mark Russell 0-2 (1tps), Sean Bourke and Jack O'Halloran 0-1 each	Referee: Martin Doyle

29 August 2025 Round 2	Cahir	0-14 – 1-11	Ballyporeen	Ardfinnan
18:30	Kevin Grogan and Jack Buckley (2f, 1tps) 0-4 each, Conor O'Brien 0-3 (3f), Dylan Butler 0-2 (1tps), Colin McEniry 0-1	Report	Conor Sweeney 0-4 (1f), James Barry 1-0, Darragh Brennan 0-3, Darragh Lyons 0-2 (1tps), Kevin O'Mahoney and Christy English 0-1 each	Referee: Sean Lonergan

31 August 2025 Round 2	Aherlow	1-12 – 4-15	Kilsheelan–Kilcash	Cashel
14:00	Liam Carew 0-7 (6f), Sean Bourke 1-1, Ben Carey 0-2 (1tps), Stephen Carey and Michael Elligott 0-1 each	Report	Micheal Freaney 2-2 (1tps), Jamie Roche 1-4 (0-2f), Michael Bates 1-0, Barry Kehoe 0-3 (1tps), Tommy O'Connor (1tps) and Shane Garland 0-2 each, Mark Stokes and Billy O'Connor 0-1 each	Referee: Shane O'Neill

13 September 2025 Round 3	Aherlow	1-13 – 1-13	Cahir	New Inn
17:30	Liam Carew 0-9 (3tpf, 1f), Micheal Elligott 1-0, Diarmuid Looby 0-2 (1tpf), Darragh O'Brien and Sean Bourke 0-1 each	Report	Kevin Grogan 0-4 (2tpf), Stephen Grogan 1-0, Colin McEniry, Ger Quinn (1 45'), Dylan Butler and Jack Buckley (2f) 0-2 each, Conor O'Brien 0-1 (1f)	Referee: Willie Fitzharris

13 September 2025 Round 3	Ballyporeen	1-16 – 0-8	Kilsheelan–Kilcash	Clonmel
17:30	Christy English 1-3, Conor Sweeney 0-6 (1tps, 2f), Darragh Brennan 0-4, Thomas Vaughan, Riain O'Callaghan and Oisin Power 0-1 each		Micheal Freaney, Shane Garland (1f) and Senan Butler (1tps) 0-2 each, Tommy O'Connor and Barry Kehoe 0-1 each	Referee: Derek O'Mahoney

=== Group 2 ===
Team	Matches				Score			Pts
Team	Pld	W	D	L	For	Against	Diff	Pts
Clonmel Commercials	3	3	0	0	7-49	0-20	+50	6
Ballina	3	1	0	2	2-34	2-42	-8	2
Ardfinnan	3	1	0	2	0-31	5-41	-25	2
Grangemockler–Ballyneale	3	1	0	2	1-30	3-41	-17	2

==== Results ====
16 August 2025 Round 1	Ballina	2-17 – 0-13	Grangemockler–Ballyneale	Templetuohy
19:00	James O'Mahoney 1-3, Eoghan Power 0-4 (2f), Thomas Shanahan 1-0, Charlie King and Ben King 0-3 each, Cathal O'Donnell 0-2, Conor Power and JP Mbokha 0-1 each	Report	Mark O'Meara 0-5 (1f), Paidi O'Shea 0-4 (2f), Sean O'Meara, James O'Meara, Thomas Regan and Manus McFadden 0-1 each	Referee: Joe Leahy

16 August 2025 Round 1	Ardfinnan	0-7 – 4-20	Clonmel Commercials	Cahir
19:00	Michael Barlow 0-4 (4f), Andrew Browne 0-2, Gerry Cronin 0-1	Report	Rory O'Dowd 2-0, Michael Quinlivan 1-3, Cian Smith 0-5 (2f), Sean O'Connor 1-1 (1-0p), Peter McGarry 0-4 (1tps), Séamus Kennedy and Jack Kennedy (1tps) 0-2 each, Tadhg Condon, Kevin Fahey and Ryan Lambe 0-1 each	Referee: Willie Fitzharris

30 August 2025 Round 2	Ardfinnan	0-11 – 1-11	Grangemockler–Ballyneale	Monroe
18:30	Michael Barlow 0-4 (1tpf, 1f), Andrew Browne 0-3 (1tpf), Shane Ryan 0-2, Billy Hewitt and Gavin Whelan 0-1 each		Ben Comerford 1-0, Jamie Walsh 0-3 (2f), Mark O'Meara and David Power (1tpf) 0-2 each, Manus McFadden, Paudie O'Shea, Joey Lyons and Sean O'Meara 0-1 each	Referee: Seanie Peters

30 August 2025 Round 2	Ballina	0-7 – 2-16	Clonmel Commercials	Drombane
18:30	Teddy Doyle 0-5 (2tpf, 1f), Ben King and Cathal Power 0-1 each	Report	Sean O'Connor 2-5 (0-1f), Peter McGarry 0-5, Jack Kennedy and Michael Quinlivan 0-2 each, Séamus Kennedy and Kevin Fahey 0-1 each	Referee: Paddy Russell

14 September 2025 Round 3	Clonmel Commercials	1-13 – 0-6	Grangemockler–Ballyneale	Monroe
17:30	Michael Quinlivan 1-3, Séamus Kennedy (1tps), Cian Smith and Sean O'Connor (1f) 0-2 each, Tadhg Condon, Jack Kennedy (1f), Ryan Lambe and Peter McGarry 0-1 each	Report	Ben Comerford (1tps) and Mark O'Meara 0-2 each, David Power (1f) and Leon Kennedy 0-1 each	Referee: Paddy Russell

14 September 2025 Round 3	Ardfinnan	0-13 – 0-10	Ballina	Annacarty
17:30	Michael Barlow 0-6 (1tpf, 2f), Andrew Browne 0-4 (4f), Gerry Cronin (1 45'), Gavin Whelan and Billy Hewitt 0-1 each	Report	Steven O'Brien 0-5 (1tpf, 2f, 1 45'), Ben King 0-3 (1f), Eoghan Power 0-2	Referee: David Grogan

=== Group 3 ===
Team	Matches				Score			Pts
Team	Pld	W	D	L	For	Against	Diff	Pts
Loughmore–Castleiney	3	3	0	0	8-36	2-35	+19	6
Upperchurch–Drombane	3	2	0	1	6-35	4-27	+14	4
Moyle Rovers	3	2	0	1	6-42	5-38	+7	4
JK Brackens	3	2	0	1	2-43	6-30	+1	4
Arravale Rovers	3	0	0	3	2-29	5-39	-19	0
Killenaule	3	0	0	3	3-26	5-42	-22	0

==== Results ====
15 August 2025 Round 1	Loughmore–Castleiney	2-14 – 0-9	Killenaule	Littleton
19:00	Eamonn Connolly 2-0, Philip O'Connell 0-4, Liam McGrath 0-3 (3f), Noel McGrath and Conor Ryan 0-2 each, John McGrath, Ciaran Connolly and Eoin O'Connell 0-1 each	Report	Tom Keaveney 0-3, Michael Doyle and Fionn Fitzgerald 0-2 each, Gus Browne and Paudie Feehan 0-1 each	Referee: Seanie Peters

17 August 2025 Round 1	Moyle Rovers	3-13 – 1-14	Upperchurch–Drombane	Bansha
12:00	Ger O'Sullivan 1-4 (1tps, 1f), Dean English and Cathal McKeown 1-0 each, Liam Boland 0-3 (2f), Sean Cotter, Riain Quigley and Cian O'Sullivan (1tps) 0-2 each	Report	Luke Shanahan 0-7 (4f, 1tps), Michael Quinlan 1-0, Sean Ryan (1tps) and Conor Fahy (1tps) 0-3 each, Paul Shanahan 0-1	Referee: Donie Horan

17 August 2025 Round 1	Arravale Rovers	0-14 – 2-13	JK Brackens	Cashel
15:30	Ciaran Kelly 0-4 (2f), Evan Ryan (3f) and Orrin Jones 0-3 each, Shane Leahy, Shane Maher, Johnny Ryan and Adam Ryan 0-1 each	Report	Jack Kennedy 0-9 (9f), Dean McEnroe 0-3, Stephen Cahill and Michael Cahill 1-0 each, Ned Delaney 0-1	Referee: Sean Lonergan

30 August 2025 Round 2	Moyle Rovers	1-16 – 1-11	Arravale Rovers	Cahir
18:30	Riain Quigley 0-6, Dean English 1-2, Ger O'Sullivan 0-3 (2f), Liam Boland 0-2, Rory Collins, Sean Cotter and Cathal McKeown 0-1 each		Orrin Jones 0-5 (3f, 1tps), Matthew Moroney 1-0, Evan Ryan 0-3 (1tpf, 1 45'), Ciaran Kelly 0-2 (2f), Niall Sharpe 0-1	Referee: David Grogan

31 August 2025 Round 2	Loughmore–Castleiney	3-9 – 0-13	JK Brackens	Templetuohy
14:00	Liam McGrath 0-5 (1tps, 3f), Eamonn Connolly, Philip O'Connell and Liam Treacy 1-0 each, Eoin O'Connell 0-2 (1tps), John McGrath (1 45') and Ciaran McGrath 0-1 each	Report	Jack Kennedy 0-7 (1tpf, 5f), Cathal Scully (1tps) and Shane Doyle (1tps) 0-2 each, Conor Cadell and Jack Nevin 0-1 each	Referee: Derek O'Mahoney

31 August 2025 Round 2	Upperchurch–Drombane	3-11 – 0-10	Killenaule	Cashel
15:30	Luke Shanahan 0-5 (3f), Conor Fahey (0-1f), Paul Shanahan (1-0p, 0-1f) and Keith Ryan 1-1 each, Sean Ryan, Ger Grant and Aaron Ryan 0-1 each	Report	Michael Doyle 0-3 (1tps), Fionn Fitzgerald (1f) and Tom Keaveney (1tps) 0-2 each, Luke Ryan, Gus Browne and Eoin Shaw 0-1 each	Referee: Brian Tyrell

13 September 2025 Round 3	JK Brackens	0-17 – 3-7	Killenaule	Gortnahoe
15:30	Jack Kennedy 0-9 (8f), Dean McEnroe 0-5, Conor Cadell, Jack Nevin and Andrew Ormond 0-1 each		Paudie Feehan 2-0, Joe O'Dwyer 0-4 (4f), Luke Ryan 1-0, Michael Doyle 0-2 (1f), Tom Keaveney 0-1	Referee: Joe Leahy

13 September 2025 Round 3	Arravale Rovers	1-4 – 2-10	Upperchurch–Drombane	Dundrum
15:30	Adam Ryan 1-0, Ciaran Kelly 0-2, John Paul Lohan and Shane Leahy 0-1 each		Luke Shanahan 1-4 (0-3f), Conor Fahey 1-1, Paul Shanahan 0-2 (2f), Pat Ryan, Paddy Phelan and Jim O'Dwyer 0-1 each	Referee: Tom McGlinchey

13 September 2025 Round 3	Moyle Rovers	2-13 – 3-13	Loughmore–Castleiney	Littleton
15:30	Liam Boland 0-8 (3f, 1tpf), Paddy O'Keefe and Riain Quigley 1-1 each, Luke Boland 0-2, Sean Cotter 0-1	Report	Philip O'Connell 1-3, Liam McGrath 0-6 (3f, 1tps), Ed Connolly 1-1, John McGrath 1-0, Brian McGrath 0-2, Conor Ryan 0-1	Referee: Shane O'Neill

== Relegation ==
=== Relegation semi-finals ===
4 October 2025 Relegation semi-final	Arravale Rovers	1-5 – 3-14	Grangemockler–Ballyneale	Ned Hall Park
15:30		Report		Referee: Brian Tyrell

5 October 2025 Relegation semi-final	Killenaule	3-14 – 1-5	Cahir	New Inn
14:00				Referee: Donie Horan

=== Relegation final ===
19 October 2025 Relegation final	Grangemockler–Ballyneale	0-13 – 0-8	Killenaule	Cloneen
13:00				Referee: Brian Tyrell

== Knockout stage ==
=== Bracket ===
Quarter-finals
5 October, Roscrea
Loughmore–Castleiney	3-18
Ballina	0-12
5 October, Cashel
Kilsheelan–Kilcash	2-9
JK Brackens	0-7
5 October, Fethard
Clonmel Commercials (a.e.t.)	0-25
Moyle Rovers	1-19
4 October, Golden
Upperchurch–Drombane	1-11
Aherlow	0-5

Semi-finals
18 October, Cashel
Loughmore–Castleiney	2-9
Kilsheelan–Kilcash	1-14
1 November, Cashel
Clonmel Commercials	1-9
Upperchurch–Drombane	0-8

Final
8 November, Semple Stadium
Kilsheelan–Kilcash	1-5
Clonmel Commercials	1-26

=== Quarter-finals ===
4 October 2025 Quarter-final	Upperchurch–Drombane	1-11 – 0-5	Aherlow	Golden
16:30	Paul Shanahan 0-5, Keith Ryan 1-1, Luke Shanahan, Conor Fahy, Ger Grant, Dean Carew and Oisin Treacy 0-1 each	Report	Liam Carew 0-3 (3f), Bernard O'Brien and Micheal Elligott 0-1 each	Referee: Willie Fitzharris

5 October 2025 Quarter-final	Clonmel Commercials	0-25 – 1-19 (a.e.t.)	Moyle Rovers	Fethard
14:30	Sean O'Connor 0-8 (3f), Jack Kennedy (1tpf, 1 45') and Cian Smith 0-4 each, Séamus Kennedy and Darragh O'Connor (1tps) 0-3 each, Kevin Fahey, Michael Quinlivan and Peter McGarry 0-1 each	Report	Paddy O'Keefe 1-4 (1tps, 1f), Liam Boland 0-6 (3f, 1 tpf), Riain Quigley 0-4 (1tps), Ger O'Sullivan 0-3 (1tps, 1f), Luke Boland and John Cronin 0-1 each	Referee: Derek O'Mahoney

5 October 2025 Quarter-final	Loughmore–Castleiney	3-18 – 0-12	Ballina	Roscrea
14:30	Liam McGrath 0-10 (1tps, 2tpf), Philip O'Connell and Eamonn Connolly 1-1 each, Brian McGrath 1-0, Liam Treacy 0-3 (1tps), John Ryan, Ciaran Connolly and Tomas McGrath 0-1 each	Report	Steven O'Brien 0-9 (1tps, 1tpf, 3f), Charlie King 0-2 (1tps), Conor Power 0-1	Referee: Joe Leahy

5 October 2025 Quarter-final	Kilsheelan–Kilcash	2-9 – 0-7	JK Brackens	Cashel
15:00	Jamie Roche 1-3 (1-0p, 1tpf), Daire Brennan 1-0, Billy O'Connor and Michael Freaney (1tps) 0-2 each, Barry Kehoe and Shane Gartland 0-1 each	Report	Paddy Cadell 0-3, Jamie Ormond 0-2, Dean McEnroe and Jack Kennedy (1f) 0-1 each	Referee: Seanie Peters

=== Semi-finals ===
18 October 2025 Semi-final	Loughmore–Castleiney	2-9 – 1-14	Kilsheelan–Kilcash	Cashel
15:30	Tomas McGrath and Willie Eviston 1-0 each, Liam Treacy (2f) and Ciaran Connolly 0-3 each, Noel McGrath, Philip O'Connell and Eamonn Connolly 0-1 each	Report	Jamie Roche 1-7 (0-5f), Micheal Freaney (1tps), Tommy O'Connor and Mark Stokes 0-2 each, Senan Butler 0-1	Referee: Derek O'Mahoney

1 November 2025 Semi-final	Clonmel Commercials	1-9 – 0-8	Upperchurch–Drombane	Cashel
14:30	Sean O'Connor 1-3 (0-1f), Cian Smith 0-2 (2f), Michael Quinlivan, Conal Kennedy, Peter McGarry and Kevin Fahey 0-1 each	Report	Paul Shanahan 0-4 (1tpf, 1f), Luke Shanahan 0-2 (1f), Oisin Treacy and Ger Grant 0-1 each	Referee: Seanie Peters

=== Final ===
8 November 2025 Final	Kilsheelan–Kilcash	1-5 – 1-26	Clonmel Commercials	Semple Stadium
15:00	Jamie Roche 1-0, Shane Garland 0-3 (1f, 1m, 1 45'), Senan Butler and Liam Freaney 0-1 each	Report	Sean O'Connor (3f) and Cian Smith (1tps, 1f) 0-6 each, Jack Kennedy 0-5 (1tps, 1 45'), Michael Quinlivan 1-1, Peter McGarry 0-4, Thomas Charles, Colman Kennedy, Sean Kennedy and Ross Peters 0-1 each	Referee: Sean Lonergan

== Championship statistics ==
=== Top scorers ===
==== Overall ====
Rank	Player	Club	Tally	Total	Matches	Average
1	Sean O'Connor	Clonmel Commercials	4-25	37	6	6.17
2	Liam Carew	Aherlow	1-28	31	4	7.75
3	Jamie Roche	Kilsheelan–Kilcash	5-18	33	5	6.6
4	Jack Kennedy	JK Brackens	0-26	26	4	6.5
5	Liam McGrath	Loughmore–Castleiney	0-24	24	5	4.8
6	Luke Shanahan	Upperchurch–Drombane	1-19	22	5	4.4
7	Michael Quinlivan	Clonmel Commercials	3-11	20	6	3.33
8	Liam Boland	Moyle Rovers	0-19	19	4	4.75
8	Cian Smith	Clonmel Commercials	0-19	19	6	3.17
10	Philip O'Connell	Loughmore–Castleiney	3-9	18	5	3.6

==== In a single game ====
Rank	Player	Club	Tally	Total	Opposition
1	Liam Carew	Aherlow	1-9	12	Ballyporeen
2	Sean O'Connor	Clonmel Commercials	2-5	11	Ballina
3	Jamie Roche	Kilsheelan–Kilcash	1-7	10	Loughmore–Castleiney
3	Liam McGrath	Loughmore–Castleiney	0-10	10	Ballina
5	Jack Kennedy	JK Brackens	0-9	9	Arravale Rovers
5	Jack Kennedy	JK Brackens	0-9	9	Killenaule
5	Liam Carew	Aherlow	0-9	9	Cahir
5	Steven O'Brien	Ballina	0-9	9	Loughmore–Castleiney
9	Micheal Freaney	Kilsheelan–Kilcash	2-2	8	Aherlow
9	Liam Boland	Moyle Rovers	0-8	8	Loughmore–Castleiney
9	Sean O'Connor	Clonmel Commercials	0-8	8	Moyle Rovers
