= 2018 Tipperary Senior Football Championship =

Tipperary S.F.C.
- Season: 2019
- Champions: Moyle Rovers (8th S.F.C. Title)
- Relegated: Drom-Inch GAA
- Winning Captain: Alan Campbell
- Man of the Match: Peter Acheson
- Winning Manager: ???

The 2018 Tipperary Senior Football Championship (sponsored by Tipperary Water) was the 128th edition of the Tipperary GAA's premier club Gaelic football tournament for senior graded teams in County Tipperary, Ireland. The tournament consisted of 16 clubs with the winner going on to represent Tipperary in the Munster Senior Club Football Championship. The championship began with a Group stage before proceeding to a knock-out format. The winning Club received the O'Dwyer Cup.

Clonmel Commercials were the defending champions, however the defence of their title came undone at the semi-final stage when losing to eventual champions Moyle Rovers.

This was Kiladangan's debut in the senior grade after claiming the 2017 Tipperary I.F.C. title.

On 28 October 2018, Moyle Rovers claimed their 9th Tipperary S.F.C. crown when defeating Ardfinnan by 1-15 to 1-7 in the final at Semple Stadium. This was their first triumph since 2009.

Drom-Inch GAA were relegated to the 2019 I.F.C. after losing their Relegation Final to ???. This ended their four year tenure in the senior ranks since their promotion in 2014.

The draw for the group stage was made on 28 January 2019.

== Team changes ==
The following teams have changed division since the 2017 championship season.

=== To S.F.C. ===
Promoted from 2017 Tipperary I.F.C.

- Kiladangan - (Intermediate Champions)

=== From S.F.C. ===
Relegated to 2018 Tipperary I.F.C.

- Fethard

== Format ==
The 16 teams are drawn into random groups of four. The top two teams from each group automatically advance to the knockout stages. Should a team finish third or fourth in their group but win their regional championship (West Tipperary S.F.C./Mid Tipperary S.F.C./South Tipperary S.F.C.), they will be re-instated into the county series in a Preliminary Quarter-Final in a random draw against any of the second placed teams.

== Regional Champions ==
West Tipperary S.F.C. Final:

- Galtee Rovers 2-8, 1-7 Éire Óg Annacarty, Cappawhite, 14/12/2018,

Mid Tipperary S.F.C. Final:

- Loughmore/Castleiney 1-12, 1-9 Upperchurch/Drombane, (AET), 14/7/2018,

South Tipperary S.F.C. Final:

- Ardfinnan w/o, scr Clonmel Commercials, Monroe, 2/12/2018,

== Group stage ==
All 16 teams enter the competition at this stage. The top 2 teams in each group go into the quarter-finals while the bottom team of each group will enter a Relegation Playoff.

=== Group A ===
Team	Pld	W	L	D	PF	PA	PD	Pts
Loughmore/Castleiney	3	3	0	0	59	30	+29	6
Kilsheelan/Kilcash	3	2	1	0	52	38	+14	4
J.K. Bracken's	3	1	2	0	24	33	-9	2
Drom & Inch	3	0	3	0	19	53	-34	0

Round 1

- Loughmore/Castleiney 1-19, 1-9 Drom-Inch, 22/4/2018,
- Kilsheelan/Kilcash 1-11, 1-10 JK Bracken's, 22/4/2018,

Round 2

- Kilsheelan/Kilcash 4-19, 1-4 Drom-Inch, 27/8/2018,
- Loughmore/Castleiney 1-16, 2-5 JK Bracken's, 27/8/2018,

Round 3

- Loughmore/Castleiney 2-12, 0-7 Kilsheelan/Kilcash, 4/9/2018,
- JK Bracken's w/o, scr Drom-Inch, 8/9/2018,

=== Group B ===
Team	Pld	W	L	D	PF	PA	PD	Pts
Moyle Rovers	3	3	0	0	57	25	+32	6
Arravale Rovers	3	2	1	0	57	35	+22	4
Upperchurch/Drombane	3	1	2	0	36	49	-13	2
Galtee Rovers	3	0	3	0	20	60	-40	0

Round 1

- Moyle Rovers 1-14, 1-8 Arravale Rovers, 22/4/2018,
- Upperchurch/Drombane 1-11, 1-7 Galtee Rovers, 22/4/2018,

Round 2

- Moyle Rovers 3-9, 1-5 Upperchurch/Drombane, 18/8/2018,
- Arravale Rovers 1-22, 0-4 Galtee Rovers, 20/8/2018,

Round 3

- Arravale Rovers 4-9, 2-8 Upperchurch/Drombane, 8/9/2018,
- Moyle Rovers 3-13, 1-3 Galtee Rovers, 8/9/2018,

=== Group C ===
Team	Pld	W	L	D	PF	PA	PD	Pts
Ballyporeen	3	3	0	0	57	37	+20	6
Killenaule	3	2	1	0	52	45	+7	4
Cahir	3	1	2	0	50	44	+6	2
Kiladangan	3	0	3	0	34	67	-33	0

Round 1

- Ballyporeen 3-16, 1-12 Cahir, 22/4/2018,
- Killenaule 4-14, 4-7 Kiladangan, 22/4/2018,

Round 2

- Ballyporeen 1-13, 2-5 Kiladangan, 19/8/2018,
- Killenaule 2-9, 0-10 Cahir, 20/8/2018,

Round 3

- Ballyporeen 2-10, 0-11 Killenaule, 8/9/2018,
- Cahir 3-16, 0-4 Kiladangan, 9/9/2018,

=== Group D ===
Team	Pld	W	L	D	PF	PA	PD	Pts
Clonmel Commercials	3	3	0	0	45	14	+31	6
Ardfinnan	3	2	1	0	36	54	-18	4
Aherlow Gaels	3	1	2	0	30	38	-6	2
Éire Óg Annacarty	3	0	3	0	21	26	-5	0

Round 1

- Clonmel Commercials 3-22, 0-7 Ardfinnan, 22/4/2018,
- Aherlow Gaels 1-9, 0-9 Éire Óg Annacarty, 22/4/2018,

Round 2

- Ardfinnan 1-11, 0-12 Éire Óg Annacarty, 20/8/2018,
- Clonmel Commercials 0-14, 0-7 Aherlow Gaels, 20/8/2018,

Round 3

- Ardfinnan 2-9, 2-5 Aherlow Gaels, 9/9/2018,
- Clonmel Commercials w/o, scr Éire Óg Annacarty, 9/9/2018,

== Relegation play-off ==
=== Relegation Semi-Final ===
6 October 2018; Relegation Semi-Final	Galtee Rovers	1-13 - 0-11	Drom-Inch	Clonoulty; Referee: ??? Man of the Match: ???

9 October 2018; Relegation Semi-Final	Éire Óg Annacarty	1-13 - 2-8	Kiladangan	Drombane; Referee: ??? Man of the Match: ???

=== Relegation Final ===
14 October 2018; Relegation Final	Kiladangan	2-11 - 1-12	Drom-Inch	Dolla; Referee: ??? Man of the Match: ???

== Knockout stage ==
=== Quarter-finals ===
21 September 2018; Quarter-Final	Moyle Rovers	3-13 - 1-9	Killenaule	New Inn; Referee: ??? Man of the Match: ???

21 September 2018; Quarter-Final	Loughmore/Castleiney	1-12 - 0-8	Arravale Rovers	Clonoulty; Referee: ??? Man of the Match: ???

30 September 2018; Quarter-Final	Clonmel Commercials	0-17 - 0-4	Kilsheelan/Kilcash	Monroe; Referee: ??? Man of the Match: ???

30 September 2018; Quarter-Final	Ardfinnan	0-22 - 0-9	Ballyporeen	Cahir; Referee: ??? Man of the Match: ???

=== Semi finals ===
14 October 2018; Semi-Final	Moyle Rovers	2-7 - 0-11	Clonmel Commercials	Cahir
14 October 2018; Semi-Final		Report		Cahir

14 October 2018; Semi-Final	Ardfinnan	0-9 - 0-8	Loughmore-Castleiney	Holycross; Referee: Seanie Peters (Aherlow).
14 October 2018; Semi-Final	Gavin Whelan (0-1), Sean Nagle (0-1), Billy Hewitt (0-2, 0-1 frees), Michael Barlow (0-4), Paul Kennedy (0-1).	Report	Joseph Hennessy (0-1), Noel McGrath (0-1), Liam McGrath (0-6, 0-4 frees).	Holycross; Referee: Seanie Peters (Aherlow).

=== Final ===
28 October 2018; 15:00; Final	Moyle Rovers	1-15 - 1-7	Ardfinnan	Semple Stadium; Attendance: 2,863; Referee: S Everard (Moyne-Templetuohy)
28 October 2018; 15:00; Final	S Foley (1-2); L Boland (0-5, 2 frees); D Foley (0-2); R Mulcahy, D McGrath, R Power, S Quirke, S Carey, D Owens (0-1 each)	Report	P Kennedy (1-0); M Barlow (0-2); B Hewitt, D O’Regan, C O’Shaughnessy, C O’Gorman, S Nagle (0-1 each).	Semple Stadium; Attendance: 2,863; Referee: S Everard (Moyne-Templetuohy)
