= 2015 Tipperary Senior Football Championship =

The 2015 Tipperary Senior Football Championship was the main club football championship that took place in County Tipperary. Loughmore-Castleiney were the defending champions after winning their 13th title in 2014, but lost in the quarter-finals to Clonmel Commercials.

Clonmel Commercials won their 16th title after a 1-12 to 3-5 win against Moyle Rovers in the final.

== Fixtures ==
Preliminary Quarter-Finals

- Loughmore-Castleiney 1-12 Kilsheelan Kilcash 1-8
- Aherlow Gaels 3-14 Thomas MacDonaghs 3-4
- Galtee Rovers 1-11 Cahir 2-6
- Killenaule received Bye

Quarter-Finals

- Arravale Rovers 0-17 Killenaule 0-9
- Moyle Rovers 4-15 Galtee Rovers 0-3
- Clonmel Commercials 2-12 Loughmore-Castleiney 1-7
- Aherlow Gaels 0-15 Eire Og Annacarty 0-8

Semi-Finals

- Clonmel Commercials 0-9 Aherlow Gaels 0-5
- Moyle Rovers 2-15 Arravale Rovers 1-14

=== Final ===
18 October 2015
2:30pm
Final

Clonmel Commercials	1-12 - 3-5	Moyle Rovers
Michael Quinlivan 0-4 (3f), Jason Lonergan 0-3 (1f), Padraig Looram 1-0, Padraig White 0-2, Seamus Kennedy, Kevin Fahey & Ian Barnes 0-1 each		Diarmuid Foley 2-0, Liam Boland 1-2f, Ciaran Kenrick 1 45', Stephen Quirke & Brian Gleeson 0-1 each

Semple Stadium, Thurles
Referee: Derek O’Mahoney (Ardfinnan)
