= 2017 Tipperary Senior Football Championship =

Tipperary S.F.C.
- Season: 2017
- Champions: Clonmel Commercials (17th title)
- Relegated: Fethard
- Winning Captain: Donal Lynch
- Man of the Match: Michael Quinlivan
- Winning Manager: Charlie McGeever

The 2017 Tipperary Senior Football Championship was the 127th edition of the Tipperary GAA's premier club Gaelic football tournament for senior graded teams in County Tipperary, Ireland. The tournament consisted of 16 teams with the winner going on to represent Tipperary in the Munster Senior Club Football Championship. The championship began with a Group stage before proceeding to a knock-out format.

Loughmore-Castleiney were the defending champions after they defeated Moyle Rovers in the previous years final.

This was Fethard's first ever year in the senior grade after claiming the 2016 Tipperary Intermediate Football Championship title, however they will drop back to the I.F.C. for 2018 after losing the Relegation final. They will be replaced by I.F.C. champions Kiladangan.

== Team changes ==
The following teams have changed division since the 2016 championship season.

=== To S.F.C. ===
Promoted from 2016 Tipperary Intermediate Football Championship

- Fethard - (Intermediate Champions)

=== From S.F.C. ===
Relegated to 2017 Tipperary Intermediate Football Championship

- Thomas MacDonaghs

== Format ==
The 16 teams are drawn into random groups of four. The top two teams automatically enter the knock-out stages. Should a team finish third or fourth in their group but win their regional championship (West Tipperary S.F.C./Mid Tipperary S.F.C./South Tipperary S.F.C.), they will be re-instated into the county series in a Preliminary Quarter-Final in a random draw against any of the second placed teams.

== Regional Champions ==
West Tipperary S.F.C. Final:

- Arravale Rovers 4-10, 2-10 Galtee Rovers, Annacarty, 2/9/2017,

Mid Tipperary S.F.C. Final:

- Loughmore/Castleiney 0-17, 0-6 Upperchurch/Drombane, Littleton, 9/9/2017,

South Tipperary S.F.C. Final:

- Clonmel Commercials 0-8, 0-8 Moyle Rovers, Clonmel, 7/1/2018, (A.E.T.),

(Final never re-fixed; competition incomplete)

== Group stage ==
All 16 teams enter the competition at this stage. The top 2 teams in each group go into the Quarter-Finals while the bottom team of each group will enter a Relegation Playoff.

=== Group A ===
Team	Pld	W	L	D	PF	PA	PD	Pts
Killenaule	3	3	0	0	70	46	+24	6
Kilsheelan-Kilcash	3	1	2	0	48	51	-3	2
JK Brackens	3	1	2	0	46	49	-3	2
Drom & Inch	3	1	2	0	14	58	-18	2

Round 1

- Drom & Inch 2-11, 1-13 JK Brackens, 7/5/2017,
- Killenaule 3-17, 2-12 Kilsheelan-Kilcash, 7/5/2017,

Round 2

- JK Brackens 1-14, 2-10 Kilsheelan-Kilcash, 23/5/2017,
- Killenaule 2-22, 2-9 Drom & Inch, 24/5/2017,

Round 3

- Kilsheelan-Kilcash 2-8, 0-8 Drom & Inch, 16/6/2017,
- Killenaule 1-13, 0-13 JK Brackens, 17/6/2017,

=== Group B ===
Team	Pld	W	L	D	PF	PA	PD	Pts
Moyle Rovers	3	3	0	0	48	24	+24	6
Aherlow Gaels	3	1	1	1	41	45	-4	3
Arravale Rovers	3	1	2	0	41	54	-13	2
Fethard	3	0	2	1	36	43	-7	1

Round 1

- Arravale Rovers 2-12, 2-10 Fethard, 6/5/2017,
- Moyle Rovers 2-14, 0-6 Aherlow Gaels, 7/5/2017,

Round 2

- Moyle Rovers 0-15, 1-7 Arravale Rovers, 24/5/2017,
- Aherlow Gaels 0-12, 0-12 Fethard, 24/5/2017,

Round 3

- Moyle Rovers 0-13, 0-8 Fethard, 16/6/2017,
- Aherlow Gaels 4-11, 1-10 Arravale Rovers, 17/6/2017,

=== Group C ===
Team	Pld	W	L	D	PF	PA	PD	Pts
Loughmore-Castleiney	2	2	0	0	48	22	+26	4
Éire Óg Annacarty	2	2	0	0	27	19	+8	4
Galtee Rovers	3	1	2	0	38	46	-8	2
Ardfinnan	3	0	3	0	34	60	-26	0

Round 1

- Galtee Rovers 3-10, 0-12 Ardfinnan, 7/5/2017,
- Loughmore Castleiney -vs- Éire Óg Annacarty,

Round 2

- Loughmore-Castleiney 2-13, 1-8 Galtee Rovers, 24/5/2017,
- Éire Óg Annacarty 0-13, 0-11 Ardfinnan, 24/5/2017,

Round 3

- Loughmore-Castleiney 3-19, 2-5 Ardfinnan, 16/6/2017,
- Éire Óg Annacarty 0-14, 0-8 Galtee Rovers, 18/6/2017, Report

=== Group D ===
Team	Pld	W	L	D	PF	PA	PD	Pts
Clonmel Commercials	3	3	0	0	69	33	+36	6
Ballyporeen	3	2	1	0	37	48	-11	4
Upperchurch-Drombane	3	1	2	0	43	57	-14	2
Cahir	3	0	3	0	49	60	-11	0

Round 1

- Ballyporeen 1-10, 0-12 Upperchurch-Drombane, 6/5/2017,
- Clonmel Commercials 0-21, 3-8 Cahir, 7/5/2017,

Round 2

- Clonmel Commercials 1-19, 0-7 Ballyporeen, 24/5/2017,
- Upperchurch-Drombane 3-13, 3-9 Cahir, 24/5/2017,

Round 3

- Clonmel Commercials 3-17, 1-6 Upperchurch-Drombane, 17/6/2017, Report
- Ballyporeen 1-14, 0-14 Cahir, 17/6/2017, Report

== Relegation play-off ==
=== Relegation Semi-Final ===
10/1/17; Relegation Semi-Final	Drom & Inch	1-12 - 0-14	Cahir	???

10/1/17; Relegation Semi-Final	Ardfinnan	1-12 - 0-4	Fethard	???

=== Relegation Final ===
7 October 2017; 1:30 pm Relegation Final	Cahir	1-13 - 2-6	Fethard	Monroe

== Knockout stage ==
=== Preliminary Quarter Final ===
Arravale Rovers won the West Tipperary S.F.C. in 2017, and thus qualified for the Knock-out stage despite finishing third in Group B.

9/23/17; 8:00 pm Preliminary Quarter-Final	Arravale Rovers	1-8 - 0-5	Éire Óg Annacarty	Clonoulty; Referee: Sean Lonergan (Moyle Rovers)
9/23/17; 8:00 pm Preliminary Quarter-Final	James Hogan 1-1, Bryan Lowry 0-3f, Shane Leahy 0-2, Kieran Lowry and Mikie O'Dwyer 0-1 each		Padraic O'Dwyer 0-2, Willie O'Neill, Dinny Crosse (0-1f) and Darragh Mooney 0-1 each	Clonoulty; Referee: Sean Lonergan (Moyle Rovers)

=== Quarter finals ===
9/23/17; 4:00 pm Quarter-Final	Loughmore-Castleiney	0-14 - 0-7	Kilsheelan-Kilcash	Golden; Referee: Paddy Russell (Emly)
9/23/17; 4:00 pm Quarter-Final	Liam McGrath 0-5 (0-2f), John McGrath and Liam Treacy 0-2 each, Brian McGrath, Evan Sweeney, Eamon Connolly, Tommy Maher, Joseph Nyland 0-1 each	Report	Evan Comerford (0-1f, 1 '45) and Brendan Martin (0-1f) 0-2 each, Eoghan Kelly, Mark Kehoe, David Smith 0-1 each	Golden; Referee: Paddy Russell (Emly)

9/23/17; 4:00 pm Quarter-Final	Killenaule	3-14 - 2-5	Aherlow	New Inn; Referee: Derek O'Mahoney (Ardfinnan)
9/23/17; 4:00 pm Quarter-Final	Kieran Bergin 2-1, John O'Dwyer 0-5 (0-3f, 2 '45), Liam Maher 1-0, Declan Fanning 0-3, Tony Doyle (0-2f) and Michael Doyle 0-2 each, Dean O'Connor 0-1	Report	Seamus Grogan and Bernard O'Brien (0-1f) 1-1 each, Tom Hanley, Barry Grogan, Ciaran McDonald 0-1 each	New Inn; Referee: Derek O'Mahoney (Ardfinnan)

9/24/17; 5:00 pm Quarter-Final	Moyle Rovers	1-19 - 0-9	Ballyporeen	Cahir; Referee: Sean Everard (Moyne-Templetuohy)
9/24/17; 5:00 pm Quarter-Final	Liam Boland 1-8 (1-0 pen, 0-2f), Sean Carey 0-4, Craig Condon and Shane Foley 0-2 each, Stephen Quirke, Aidan McGrath, Brian Mulvihill 0-1 each		Conor Sweeney 0-6 (0-2f) and Darragh Lyons 0-3	Cahir; Referee: Sean Everard (Moyne-Templetuohy)

9/27/17; 8:00 pm Quarter-Final	Clonmel Commercials	0-10 - 0-9	Arravale Rovers	Ballyporeen; Referee: John Butler (Upperchurch/Drombane)
9/27/17; 8:00 pm Quarter-Final	Jack Kennedy 0-4 (0-2f), Michael Quinlivan 0-2, Kevin Fahey, Jason Lonergan (0-1f), Shane Flynn, Alan Lonergan 0-1 each	Report	James Hogan 0-4 (0-3f), Bryan Lowry 0-3 (0-2f), Paddy Dalton and Niall Dovovan (0-1f) 0-1 each	Ballyporeen; Referee: John Butler (Upperchurch/Drombane)

=== Semi finals ===
1 October 2017; 2:00 pm Semi-Final	Killenaule	2-16 - 1-18	Moyle Rovers	Cahir; Referee: Sean Everard; Man of the Match: John O'Dwyer
1 October 2017; 2:00 pm Semi-Final	John O'Dwyer 2-3 (1-0 pen, 0-2f), Michael Doyle 0-4, Paidi Feehan and Tony Doyle 0-3 each, Kieran Bergin 0-2, Joe O'Dwyer 0-1	Report	Liam Boland 0-10 (0-6f), Diarmuid Foley 1-1, Danny Owens and Shane Foley 0-2 each, Aidan McGrath, Sean Carey, Darragh Dwyer 0-1 each	Cahir; Referee: Sean Everard; Man of the Match: John O'Dwyer

1 October 2017; 2:00 pm Semi-Final	Clonmel Commercials	1-9 - 1-6	Loughmore-Castleiney	Cashel; Referee: David Grogan (Aherlow); Man of the Match: Jason Lonergan
1 October 2017; 2:00 pm Semi-Final	Jason Lonergan 1-2, Jack Kennedy (0-3f) and Michael Quinlivan 0-3 each, Pauric Looram 0-1	Report	Liam McGrath 0-4f, Noel McGrath 1-0, Ciaran McGrath and Evan Sweeney 0-1 each	Cashel; Referee: David Grogan (Aherlow); Man of the Match: Jason Lonergan

=== Final ===
15 October 2017; 3:30 pm Final	Clonmel Commercials	2-9 - 0-8	Killenaule	Semple Stadium; Attendance: 2,451; Referee: Derek O'Mahoney (Ardfinnan); Man of the Match: Michael Quinlivan
15 October 2017; 3:30 pm Final	Michael Quinlivan 0-4, Jamie Peters and Richie Gunne 1-0 each, Jason Lonergan 0-3 (0-2f), Jack Kennedy (0-1f) and Eoin Fitzgerald 0-1 each	Report	Kieran Bergin 0-3 (0-2f), John O'Dwyer 0-2, Matthew O'Donnell (1 '45), Paddy Codd, Tony Doyle (0-1f) 0-1 each	Semple Stadium; Attendance: 2,451; Referee: Derek O'Mahoney (Ardfinnan); Man of the Match: Michael Quinlivan
