= Brian O'Meara (Kilruane MacDonagh's hurler) =

Irish hurler

Personal information
- Native name: Brian Ó Meadhra (Irish)
- Nickname: Buggy
- Born: 27 March 1990 (age 36) Ballingarry, North Tipperary, Ireland
- Height: 1.88 m (6 ft 2 in)

Sport
- Sport: Hurling
- Position: Left half forward
Clubs
- Years: Club
- 2007– 2007–: Kilruane MacDonagh's; Thomas MacDonagh's
Club titles
	Football	Hurling
Tipperary titles	1	
Inter-county
Years	County	Apps (scores)
2010–2013	Tipperary	6 (1-6)
Inter-county titles
- Munster titles: 2
- All-Irelands: 1

Brian "Buggy" O'Meara (born 27 March 1990) is an Irish hurler who previously played for the Tipperary senior team. His brother Niall O'Meara also played for Tipperary.

O'Meara made his first appearance for the team during the 2010 championship and has become a regular player over the last few seasons. Since then he has won one Munster winners' medal.

At club level O'Meara is a county football championship medallist with divisional side Thomas MacDonagh's. He plays hurling with his local club Kilruane MacDonagh's.

== Playing career ==
=== Club ===
O'Meara plays his club hurling and Gaelic football with the Kilruane MacDonagh's club.

In 2011 he was a member of the divisional Thomas MacDonagh's team that reached the final of the county football championship. Moyle Rovers provided the opposition. Thomas MacDonagh's were the winners by 0–9 to 0–7.

=== Inter-county ===
O'Meara first came to prominence on the inter-county scene as a member of the Tipperary minor hurling team in 2008.

After enjoying little success in the minor grade, he later became a dual player in the under-21 grade in 2010. A 1–22 to 1–17 defeat of Clare in the provincial hurling decider gave O'Meara a Munster medal. Tipp later played Galway in the All-Ireland final and went on to trounce the westerners by 5–22 to 0–12. It was O'Meara's first All-Ireland medal in that grade.

That same year O'Meara was a key member of the Tipperary under-21 football team. He won a Munster medal that year as Tipp defeated Kerry by 1–7 to 1–6. It was Tipperary's very first Munster title in that grade.

By this stage O'Meara was also a member of the Tipperary senior hurling team. He made his debut at full-forward in a Munster quarter-final defeat by Cork in 2010. O'Meara was subsequently dropped from the team and played no part in Tipp's subsequent All-Ireland victory over Kilkenny.

After remaining on the periphery of the team for 2011, O'Meara was back on the starting fifteen the following year. He began the year by winning a Waterford Crystal Cup medal following a 1–21 to 2–12 defeat of Clare. A subsequent 2–17 to 0–16 defeat of Waterford in the provincial decider gave him his first Munster medal on the field of play. Tipperary later faced a humiliating 4–24 to 1–15 defeat by eventual champions Kilkenny in the All-Ireland semi-final.

== Honours ==
=== Team ===
Thomas MacDonagh's

- Tipperary Senior Football Championship (1): 2011

Kilruane MacDonagh's

- Tipperary Senior Hurling Championship: 2022

Tipperary

- All-Ireland Senior Hurling Championship (1): 2010
- Munster Senior Hurling Championship (2): 2011, 2012
- All-Ireland Under-21 Hurling Championship (1): 2010
- Munster Under-21 Hurling Championship (1): 2010
- Munster Under-21 Football Championship (1): 2010
- Waterford Crystal Cup (1): 2012
