= Jim O'Meara (Gaelic footballer) =

Irish Gaelic footballer

Personal information
- Native name: Séamus Ó Meára (Irish)
- Born: 1966 (age 59–60) Grangemockler, County Tipperary, Ireland

Sport
- Sport: Gaelic football
- Position: Centre-forward
Club
- Years: Club
- Grangemockler
Club titles
- Tipperary titles: 0
Inter-county
- Years: County
- 1986-1995: Tipperary
Inter-county titles
- Munster titles: 0
- All-Irelands: 0
- NFL: 0
- All Stars: 0

Jim O'Meara (born 1966) is an Irish retired Gaelic footballer who played as a centre-forward for the Tipperary senior team.

Born in Grangemockler, County Tipperary, O'Meara first arrived on the inter-county scene at the age of sixteen when he first linked up with the Tipperary minor team before later joining the under-21 side. O'Meara joined the senior panel during the 1986 championship.

At club level O'Meara played with Grangemockler.

He retired from inter-county football following the conclusion of the 1995 championship.

In retirement from playing O'Meara became involved in team management and coaching, most notably as manager of the Tipperary junior team.

== Honours ==
=== Player ===
Tipperary

- Munster Minor Football Championship (1): 1984
