= Éamonn Hanrahan =

Irish Gaelic footballer

Personal information
- Native name: Éamonn Ó hAnracháin (Irish)
- Born: 17 July 1978 (age 48) Clonmel, County Tipperary, Ireland
- Occupation: Cork City Council Housing Official
- Height: 6 ft 7 in (201 cm)

Sport
- Sport: Gaelic football
- Position: Midfield
Clubs
- Years: Club
- Clonmel Commercials; University College Cork
Club titles
- Tipperary titles: 2
- Munster titles: 1
Inter-county
- Years: County
- 2000-2010: Tipperary
Inter-county titles
- Munster titles: 0
- All-Irelands: 0
- NFL: 0
- All Stars: 0

Éamonn Hanrahan (born 1978) is an Irish retired Gaelic footballer who played as a midfielder for the Tipperary senior team.

Born in Clonmel, County Tipperary, Hanrahan first arrived on the inter-county scene at the age of nineteen when he first linked up with the Tipperary under-21 team. He joined the senior panel during the 2000 championship. Hanrahan immediately became a regular member of the starting fifteen and won one Tommy Murphy Cup medal.

At club level Hanrahan is a one-time Munster medallist with University College Cork. In addition to this he also won championship medals with UCC and Clonmel Commercials.

Hanrahan announced his retirement from inter-county football on 7 January 2010.

== Honours ==
=== Player ===
Clonmel Commercials

- Tipperary Senior Club Football Championship (1): 2002, 2012

University College Cork

- Munster Senior Club Football Championship (1): 1999
- Cork Senior Club Football Championship (1): 1999

Tipperary

- Tommy Murphy Cup (1): 2005
- McGrath Cup (1): 2003
