= Brian Mulvihill (Gaelic footballer) =

Irish Gaelic footballer

Personal information
- Native name: Briain Ó Maoilmhichil (Irish)
- Born: 1986 (age 39–40) Kilkenny, County Kilkenny, Ireland
- Occupation: Accountant
- Height: 5 ft 11 in (180 cm)

Sport
- Sport: Gaelic football
- Position: Right corner-forward
Club
- Years: Club
- Moyle Rovers
Club titles
- Tipperary titles: 2
Inter-county
- Years: County
- 2005-2015: Tipperary
Inter-county titles
- Munster titles: 0
- All-Irelands: 0
- NFL: 3
- All Stars: 0

Brian Mulvihill (born 1986) is an Irish Gaelic footballer who plays as a right corner-forward for the Tipperary senior team.

Born in Clonmel, County Tipperary, Mulvihill first arrived on the inter-county scene at the age of sixteen when he first linked up with the Tipperary minor team before later joining the under-21 side. He joined the senior panel during the 2005 championship. Mulvihill immediately became a regular member of the starting fifteen and has won one Tommy Murphy Cup medal and 3 NFL titles (2x Division 4 and 1x Division 3).

At club level Mulvihill is a two-time championship medallist with Moyle Rovers. Mulvihill won a North American Championship medal with Wolfe Tones, Chicago in 2006.

== Honours ==
=== Player ===
Moyle Rovers

- Tipperary Senior Football Championship (2): 2007, 2009

Tipperary

- Tommy Murphy Cup (1): 2005
