= Richie Quirke =

Irish Gaelic footballer

Personal information
- Native name: Risteard Ó Coirc (Irish)
- Born: 1966 (age 59–60) Cahir, County Tipperary, Ireland

Sport
- Sport: Gaelic football
- Position: Full-Back
Club
- Years: Club
- Cahir
Club titles
- Tipperary titles: 0
Inter-county
- Years: County
- 1988-1992: Tipperary
Inter-county titles
- Munster titles: 0
- All-Irelands: 0
- NFL: 0
- All Stars: 0

Richard Quirke (born 1966) is an Irish Gaelic footballer who played as a full-back for the Tipperary senior team.

Born in Cahir, County Tipperary, Quirke first arrived on the inter-county scene at the age of sixteen when he first linked up with the Tipperary minor team before later joining the under-21 side. Enright joined the senior panel during the 1988 championship while he also played with the Tipperary junior hurling team.

At club level Quirke played with Cahir.

He retired from inter-county football following the conclusion of the 1992 championship.

== Honours ==
=== Player ===
Tipperary

- All-Ireland Junior Hurling Championship (1): 1989
- Munster Junior Hurling Championship (2): 1988, 1989
- Munster Minor Football Championship (1): 1984
