= Peter Acheson =

Irish Gaelic football player (born 1990)

Personal information
- Born: 15 March 1990 (age 36)

Sport
- Sport: Gaelic Football
- Position: Midfield
Club
- Years: Club
- 2007-present: Moyle Rovers
Club titles
- Tipperary titles: 3
Inter-county
Years	County	Apps (scores)
2007-present	Tipperary	29 (4-35)

Peter Acheson (born 15 March 1990) is an Irish Gaelic football player who plays at inter-county level for Tipperary, and plays his club football for Moyle Rovers.

== Career ==
He played minor football for Tipperary in 2007 and 2008, and under-21 football from 2009 until 2011. He also played minor hurling in 2007 and 2008 for Tipperary. Acheson made his championship debut for the Tipperary footballers in 2010 against Kerry on 16 May in a 2-18 to 2-6 defeat where he scored a point. On 31 July 2016, he started in midfield as Tipperary defeated Galway in the 2016 All-Ireland Quarter-finals at Croke Park to reach their first All-Ireland semi-final since 1935. On 21 August 2016, Tipperary were beaten in the semi-final by Mayo on a 2-13 to 0-14 scoreline.

Acheson relocated to Dubai after the 2016 season.

In 2018, Acheson while still being based in Dubai commuted to play in the 2018 Tipperary Senior Football Championship with Moyle Rovers reaching the final on 28 October against Ardfinnan.

== Honours ==
Tipperary

- National Football League Division 4 Winners: 2014
- Munster Under-21 Football Championship (1): 2010
- Munster Minor Hurling Championship (1): 2007
- All-Ireland Minor Hurling Championship (1): 2007

Moyle Rovers

- Tipperary Senior Football Championship (3): 2007, 2009, 2018
