= Thomas MacDonagh's GFC =

Gaelic games club in County Tipperary, Ireland

- CPG Tomás Mac Donnchadha
- Founded: 2007
- County: Tipperary
- Colours: Yellow and green

Playing kits
Standard colours

Thomas MacDonagh's Gaelic Football Club is a Gaelic Athletic Association amalgamation representing nine clubs in County Tipperary in Ireland. The club plays Gaelic football in the North division of Tipperary GAA and is named after the Irish revolutionary and Kilruane native Thomas MacDonagh.

== History ==
The team was formed in 2007 to allow junior and intermediate footballers in the division to compete at senior level, and represents nine North division football clubs - Lorrha-Dorrha GAA, Shannon Rovers GAA, Borrisokane GAA, Knockshegowna GAA, Kildangan GAA, Kilruane MacDonaghs GAA, Toomevara GAA, Moneygall GAA and Inane Rovers. They won all four North Tipperary Senior Football Championship titles between 2007 and 2010; there was no final in 2011 as Father John Kenyon's GAA did not participate in the North competition.

In the 2011 County Senior Football Championship quarter final, Thomas MacDonagh's beat Mid Tipperary champions J.K. Bracken's by 1–9 to 0–8. In the semi-final they defeated fourteen-time champions Clonmel Commercials by 1–5 to 0–6 to become the first team from the North division to reach a county senior football final since Kilruane MacDonagh's in 1975.

On 6 November, they won the Tipperary Senior Football Championship for the very first time, beating Moyle Rovers 0–9 to 0–7 in the final. As a divisional team, they were not eligible to compete in the Munster Senior Club Football Championship, so runners-up Moyle Rovers took their place in that competition.

=== Honours ===
- Tipperary Senior Football Championship (1)
  - 2011
- North Tipperary Senior Football Championship (4)
  - 2007, 2008, 2009, 2010

=== Notable players ===
- Brian O'Meara, county hurler
- George Hannigan, county footballer
- Philip Austin, county footballer
