= Jack Kennedy (Gaelic footballer) =

Irish footballer

Personal information
- Native name: Sean Ó Cinnéide (Irish)
- Born: Clonmel, County Tipperary, Ireland

Sport
- Sport: Gaelic football
- Position: Midfield
Club
- Years: Club
- Clonmel Commercials
Club titles
- Tipperary titles: 6
- Munster titles: 1
Inter-county
Years	County	Apps (scores)
2017-	Tipperary	15 (0-27)
Inter-county titles
- Munster titles: 1
- All-Irelands: 0
- NFL: 0
- All Stars: 0

Jack Kennedy is an Irish Gaelic footballer who plays as a midfielder for the Tipperary senior team. At club level, Kennedy plays with Clonmel Commercials.

== Clonmel Commercials ==
On the 29 November 2015, Kennedy started in midfield and scored a point as Clonmel Commercials beat Nemo Rangers to win their first ever Munster Senior Club Football Championship on a scoreline of 1-07 to 0-09.

On the 27 September 2020, Kennedy scored a last minute winning point in 2020 Tipperary Senior Football Championship final, which saw Clonmel Commercials retain the Tipperary senior football title as they held off Loughmore/Castleiney.

== Tipperary ==
Kennedy was a member of the Tipperary minor football team that reached the 2015 All-Ireland Minor Football Championship Final, starting midfield in all their games. He scored 0-05 in the Munster quarter final victory against Waterford, another 0-05 in the semi final defeat of Clare, before scoring 0-02 in the Munster final loss to Kerry. He scored a point in their All Ireland championship quarter final victory against Galway before producing a man-of-the-match performance scoring 0-04 against Kildare in the semi-final. In the final, Kennedy scored a point as Tipperary were beaten by Kerry.

== Career statistics ==
As of matched played 7 April 2024

Year	Team	National League			Munster		All-Ireland		Total	
Year	Team	Division	Apps	Score	Apps	Score	Apps	Score	Apps	Score
2017	Tipperary	Division 3			-		2	0-05	2	0-05
2018	Tipperary	Division 2			2	0-02	1	0-01	3	0-03
2019	Tipperary	Division 2			1	0-00	1	0-01	2	0-01
2020	Tipperary	Division 3			2	0-05	-		2	0-05
2021	Tipperary	Division 3			1	0-03	-		1	0-03
2022	Tipperary	Division 4			2	0-07	-		2	0-07
2023	Tipperary	Division 4			2	0-04	-		2	0-04
2024	Tipperary	Division 4			1	0-00	-		1	0-00
Total					11	0-21	4	0-07	15	0-28

== Honours ==
=== Player ===
Clonmel Commercials

- Tipperary Senior Football Championship (6): 2015, 2017, 2019, 2020, 2022, 2023
- Munster Senior Club Football Championship (1): 2015

Tipperary

- Munster Senior Football Championship (1): 2020
