= Benny Hickey =

Irish Gaelic footballer

Personal information
- Native name: Beircheart Ó hIcí (Irish)
- Born: 1978 (age 47–48) Cahir, County Tipperary, Ireland

Sport
- Sport: Gaelic football
- Position: Centre-forward
Club
- Years: Club
- Cahir
Club titles
- Tipperary titles: 1
Inter-county
- Years: County
- 2002-2006: Tipperary
Inter-county titles
- Munster titles: 0
- All-Irelands: 0
- NFL: 0
- All Stars: 0

Benny Hickey (born 1978) is an Irish Gaelic footballer who played as a centre-forward for the Tipperary senior team.

Born in Cahir, County Tipperary, Hickey first arrived on the inter-county scene at the age of twenty when he first linked up with the Tipperary under-21 team before later joining the junior side. He joined the senior football panel during the 2002 championship. Hickey subsequently became a regular member of the starting fifteen and won one Tommy Murphy Cup medal.

At club level Hickey is a one-time championship medallist with Cahir.

Hickey retired from inter-county football following the conclusion of the 2006 championship.

== Honours ==
=== Player ===
Cahir

- Tipperary Senior Football Championship (1): 2003

Tipperary

- Tommy Murphy Cup (1): 2005
- McGrath Cup (1): 2003
