= Inane Rovers GFC =

Gaelic games club in County Tipperary, Ireland

Inane Rovers GAA
- CPG Fániathe Eidhneáin
- Founded: 1950
- County: Tipperary
- Colours: Green and Gold

Playing kits
Standard colours

Inane Rovers Gaelic Football Club (Irish: CPG Fániathe Eidhneáin) is a Gaelic Athletic Association club in County Tipperary, Ireland. The club was founded in 1950, is based outside Moneygall and plays Gaelic football in the North division of Tipperary GAA.

== History ==
As hurling is the dominant sport in the North division, the club has had limited success at county level in its own right, but has contributed to the success of Thomas MacDonagh's, an amalgamation with other North division football clubs.

=== Honours ===
- Tipperary Senior Football Championship (1)
  - (as MacDonagh's) 2011
- North Tipperary Senior Football Championship (5)
  - 1966
  - (as MacDonagh's) 2007, 2008, 2009, 2010
- North Tipperary Intermediate Football Championship (1)
  - 1998
- Tipperary Junior A Football Championship (2)
  - 1961, 2014
- North Tipperary Junior A Football Championship (12)
  - 1952, 1953, 1954, 1955, 1956, 1957, 1958, 1959, 1969, 1977, 1992, 1993
- Tipperary Under-21 A Football Championship (4)
  - 1968, 1972, 1977, 1979
- Tipperary Minor A Football Championship (1)
  - 1969
- North Tipperary Minor A Football Championship (21)
  - 1952, 1954, 1965, 1966, 1967, 1968, 1969, 1973, 1974, 1975, 1976, 1978, 1980, 1981, 1987, 1997, 1998, 2003, 2004, 2005, 2010
- Tipperary Minor B Football Championship (2)
  - 1995, 2012
- North Tipperary Minor B Football Championship (2)
  - 1995, 2012

=== Notable players ===
Johnny Smacks of the 2 Johnnies
