= Kevin Fahey =

Irish Gaelic footballer

Personal information
- Native name: Caoimhín Ó Fathaigh (Irish)
- Born: Clonmel, County Tipperary, Ireland

Sport
- Sport: Gaelic football
- Position: Centre-back
Club
- Years: Club
- Clonmel Commercials
Club titles
- Tipperary titles: 5
- Munster titles: 1
Inter-county
- Years: County
- Tipperary
Inter-county titles
- Munster titles: 1
- All-Irelands: 0
- NFL: 0
- All Stars: 0

Kevin Fahey is an Irish Gaelic footballer who plays as a centre-back for the Tipperary senior team. At club level Fahey plays with Clonmel Commercials.

On 22 November 2020, Fahey started at centre-back as Tipperary won the 2020 Munster Senior Football Championship after a 0-17 to 0-14 win against Cork in the final. It was Tipperary's first Munster title in 85 years.

In January 2021, Fahey was nominated for an All-Star award.

== Honours ==
=== Player ===
Clonmel Commercials

- Tipperary Senior Football Championship (5): 2012, 2015, 2017, 2019, 2020
- Munster Senior Club Football Championship (1): 2015

Tipperary

- Munster Senior Football Championship (1): 2020
