= Grangemockler–Ballyneale GAA =

GAA club in Tipperary, Ireland

Grangemockler / Ballyneale GAA
- Gráinseach Mhóicléir
- Founded: 1885
- County: Tipperary
- Nickname: The Parish
- Colours: Green and White
- Grounds: Michael Hogan community sportsfield

Playing kits
Standard colours

Senior Club Championships
	All Ireland	Munster champions	Tipperary champions
Football:	0	0	8
Hurling:	0	0	0

Grangemockler / Ballyneale GAA is a Gaelic Athletic Association club located in the south-east corner of County Tipperary in Ireland. The club plays Gaelic football and hurling as part of the South division of Tipperary GAA. They are the fourth most successful Gaelic football team in County Tipperary, winning the Tipperary Senior Football Championship on eight occasions.

== History ==
The club was founded in 1885, one year after the founding of the GAA. The club won its first ever Tipperary senior football championship title in 1890 and had to wait thirteen years before winning again in 1903 when the team won the title five consecutive seasons (1903 to 19070. The team was beaten the following year and the title was won by Cloneen but returned again in 1909 to take the title once more beating Clonmel Emmets in the final. It was another twenty two years before the team would win the title again in 1931.

The Tipperary county footballers that were attacked at Croke Park on Bloody Sunday of 1920 wore the Grangemockler colours. At that time the county wore the colours of its county champions, not having an official jersey. The then county champions Fethard wore blue and white but Grangemockler's white and green was worn instead. The county footballers wore a white and green commemorative jersey for the 2020 Munster Senior Football Championship final - a replica of the jersey colours worn in 1920.

== Facilities ==
The club has two full sized playing fields, one in Grangemockler and one in Ballyneale, a flood light training field and a sports hall. Opened on 17 March 2009, the sports hall has a kitchen, hall and two dressing rooms.

== Honours ==
- Tipperary Senior Football Championship (8)
  - 1890, 1903, 1904, 1905, 1906, 1907, 1909, 1931
- South Tipperary Senior Football Championship (9)
  - 1890, 1903, 1904, 1905, 1906, 1907, 1909, 1931, 1990 (with St. Patrick's)
- Tipperary Intermediate Football Championship (3)
  - 1991, 2003, 2023
- South Tipperary intermediate Football Championship (5)
  - 1990, 1991, 2002, 2014, 2022
- Tipperary Junior Football Championship (1)
  - 1962
- South Tipperary Junior Football Championship (3)
  - 1957, 1962, 1977
- South Tipperary Junior B Football Championship (2)
  - 2021, 2022
- Tipperary Under-21 Football Championship (1)
  - 2020
- South Tipperary Under-21 A Football Championship (2)
  - 1961, 2020
- Tipperary Under-21 C Football Championship (1)
  - 2002
- South Tipperary Under-21 C Football Championship (1)
  - 2002
- Tipperary Minor A Football Championship (3)
  - 1984 (with Moyle Rovers as Slievenamon), 1987 (with Moyle Rovers as Slievenamon) 2019
- South Tipperary Minor A Football Championship (4)
  - 1984 (with Moyle Rovers as Slievenamon), 1986 (with Moyle Rovers as Slievenamon), 1987 (with Moyle Rovers as Slievenamon), 2019
- South Tipperary Minor C Football Championship (2)
  - 2002, 2009
- Tipperary Junior A Hurling Championship (1)
  - 2004
- South Tipperary Minor 'B' Hurling Championship(2)
  - 2015, 2021(u-19)
- South Tipperary Under-21 'B' Hurling Championship(2)
  - 2016, 2019
- South Tipperary Under-21 C Hurling Championship(1)
  - 2012

== Notable players ==
- Michael Hogan (1896–1920) was a Gaelic footballer, and one-time Captain of the Tipperary GAA team. He was a member of the Irish Volunteers and was born in the Grangemockler area of County Tipperary. The Hogan stand in Croke Park is named in his honor. He is buried in Grangemockler church
