= Michael Quinlivan =

Irish Gaelic footballer

Personal information
- Native name: Mícheál Ó Caoinnealbháin (Irish)
- Nickname: MQ14
- Born: 15 February 1993 (age 33) Clonmel, Ireland
- Occupation: Accountant
- Height: 1.9 m (6 ft 3 in)

Sport
- Sport: Gaelic football
- Position: Full Forward
Club
- Years: Club
- 2010-: Clonmel Commercials
Club titles
- Tipperary titles: 7
- Munster titles: 1
College(s)
- Years: College
- Mary Immaculate College; University College Cork
College titles
- Sigerson titles: 1
Inter-county*
Years	County	Apps (scores)
2012-	Tipperary	33 (9-69)
Inter-county titles
- Munster titles: 1
- All Stars: 1
- *Inter County team apps and scores correct as of 10 July 2021.

Michael Quinlivan (born 15 February 1993) is an Irish Gaelic footballer who plays at inter-county level for Tipperary, and played his club football for Clonmel Commercials in South Tipperary.

== Early life ==
Quinlivan's father, Martin, played for Tipperary and Clonmel Commercials as a goalkeeper during the 1990s, as well as in the League of Ireland with Waterford United. Martin Quinlivan was also a selector when Commercials won two Tipp SFCs and the Munster Club SFC.

== Career ==
=== Clonmel Commercials ===
On 15 November 2015, Clonmel Commercials reached their first Munster Senior Club Championship final since 1994 after a 1–13 to 0–3 win against Milltown Malbay in the semi-final. On 29 November 2015, they won their first Munster Senior Club title after defeating Nemo Rangers in the final in Mallow. Training by two points in the second minute of injury time, Quinlivan scored with a low shot to the net to win the game by one point.

=== Tipperary ===
He made his senior championship debut for Tipperary in 2012 against Kerry where he scored 2 points in a 0–10 to 0–16 defeat.

In 2011, he won an All-Ireland Minor Football Championship medal after a 3–9 to 1–14 win against Dublin in the final. In 2013, he scored A total of 15–127 in 13 games for club side Commercials. In 2016, he was branded the second best footballer in Ireland, behind Ciaran Kilkenny of Dublin. On 31 July 2016, Quinlivan started in the corner forward position and scored 1–4 as Tipperary defeated Galway in the 2016 All-Ireland Quarter-finals at Croke Park to reach their first All-Ireland semi-final since 1935. On 21 August 2016, Tipperary were beaten in the semi-final by Mayo on a 2–13 to 0–14 scoreline, a game in which Quinlivan scored 0-07 (all from frees). On 3 November 2016, Quinlivan won his first All-Star award, being picked in the full-forward position. He became just the second Tipperary footballer to claim an All Star, joining Declan Browne who won awards in 1998 and 2003.

On 2 April 2017, Quinlivan scored 4–6 against Armagh in the round 7 of Division 3 of the National Football League. His fourth goal, a low finish to the top of the stand from the left came in injury time as Tipperary clinched promotion to Division 2 with a 3–8 to 0–16 win. On 8 April 2017, Quanlivan was man of the match as Tipperary defeated Louth 3–19 to 0–19 in the Division 3 final at Croke Park.

Quinlivan indicated that he would miss the 2020 season as he had decided to go travelling for the year. Due to the COVID-19 pandemic his plans changed and he returned to the side. On 22 November 2020, Tipperary won the 2020 Munster Senior Football Championship after a 0–17 to 0–14 win against Cork in the final, with Quinlivan scoring 0-05 (0-04 from play). It was Tipperary's first Munster title in 85 years.

In January 2022, Quinlivan confirmed that he would miss the 2022 season due to work commitments.

== Career statistics ==
As of match played 19 July 2021

Year	National League			Munster		All-Ireland		Total	
Year	Division	Apps	Score	Apps	Score	Apps	Score	Apps	Score
2012	Division 3			1	0-02	4	0-12	5	0-14
2013	Division 4			-		-		0	0-00
2014	Division 4			2	0-02	3	1-04	5	1-06
2015	Division 3			2	3-03	2	0-03	4	3-06
2016	Division 3			3	1-10	3	1-17	6	2-27
2017	Division 3			1	0-00	2	1-01	3	1-01
2018	Division 2			2	0-04	1	1-02	3	1-06
2019	Division 2			1	1-02	1	0-01	2	1-03
2020	Division 3			3	0-06	1	0-00	4	0-06
2021	Division 3			1	0-00	-		1	0-00
Total				16	5-29	17	4-40	33	9-69

== Honours ==
Clonmel Commercials

- Tipperary Senior Football Championship (7): 2012, 2015, 2017, 2019, 2020, 2022, 2023
- Munster Senior Club Football Championship (1): 2015

Tipperary

- All-Ireland Minor Football Championship (1): 2011
- Munster Minor Football Championship (1): 2011
- National Football League Division 4 (1): 2014
- National Football League Division 3 (1): 2017
- Munster Senior Football Championship (1): 2020

UCC

- Sigerson Cup (1): 2014

Individual

- All Star Award (1): 2016
