= Fethard GAA =

Gaelic football club in County Tipperary, Ireland

- Fiodh-Ard
- Founded: 1887
- County: Tipperary
- Colours
- Grounds: Fethard GAA Park

Playing kits
Standard colours

Senior Club Championships
	All Ireland	Munster champions	Tipperary champions
Football:	0	0	21

Fethard GAA is a Gaelic Athletic Association gaelic football and Hurling club located in the medieval town of Fethard, County Tipperary in Ireland. The club is affiliated to the South Division of Tipperary GAA. They have been Tipperary Senior Football champions on a record twenty one occasions.

== History ==
The Tipperary county footballers that were attacked at Croke Park on Bloody Sunday of 1920 wore the Grangemockler colours. At that time the county wore the colours of its county champions, not having an official jersey. Fethard were the then county champions but, instead of Fethard's blue and white, Grangemockler's white and green was worn instead. The county footballers wore a white and green commemorative jersey for the 2020 Munster Senior Football Championship final - a replica of the jersey colours worn in 1920.

The club grounds is "Fethard GAA Park", or the Barracks field as it's known as locally, Due to the fact it was once part of the army drill grounds. In 1931 upon arrival in Fethard Br Leo Slattery, the thorny process of acquiring the field began. However it took another Brother, Br Albert Small to sort all the legal matters. On Sunday ninth July 1974, the field and grounds were officially opened by Fr Cunningham, local curate. On 11 May 1982, following improvements to the grounds, it was officially opened as Fethard GAA Park. The medieval Town Wall circumnavigating Fethard runs along the southern boundary of the grounds. The facilities present include a full sized field, a patrons stand, two tennis courts, two covered handball courts, dressing rooms and an Astro turf facility completed in 2017.

== Honours ==
=== Gaelic football ===
- Tipperary Senior Football Champions (21) 1887, 1917, 1918, 1919, 1920, 1922, 1923, 1924, 1927, 1928, 1938, 1942, 1954, 1957, 1978, 1984, 1988, 1991, 1993, 1997, 2001
- Tipperary Intermediate Football Championship (1) 2016
- Tipperary Junior Football Championship Winners (2) 1926 (with Annervale Rovers), 1999
- Tipperary Junior B Football Championship Winners (2) 1998, 2012
- Tipperary Under-21 Football Championship Winners (2 (8) 1966, 1967, 1968, 1987, 1988, 2000, 2001, 2002
- Tipperary Minor A Football Championship Winners (4) 1957, 1985, 1989, 1999
- South Tipperary Senior Football Championship Winners (27) 1914, 1917, 1918, 1922, 1923, 1924, 1925, 1927, 1928, 1938, 1942, 1943, 1950, 1954, 1955, 1957, 1969, 1976, 1978, 1979, 1980, 1984, 1985, 1988, 1992, 1997, 2002, 2005
- South Tipperary Intermediate Football Championship (2) 2016, 2025
- South Tipperary Junior Football Championship Winners (10) 1913, 1919, 1923, 1926 (with Annervale Rovers), 1929, 1984, 1990, 1999, 2003, 2008
- South Tipperary Junior B Football Championship Winners (3) 1998, 2012, 2025
- South Tipperary Under-21 Football Championship (10) 1966, 1967, 1978, 1987, 1988, 1993, 1999, 2000, 2001, 2002
- South Tipperary Under-21 B Football Championship (1) 2007
- South Tipperary Minor A Football Championship Winners (10) 1932, 1933, 1951, 1952, 1957, 1972, 1985, 1988, 1989, 1999
- South Tipperary Minor B Football Championship (1) 2007

=== Hurling ===
- Tipperary Junior A Hurling Championship (1): 2026
- South Tipperary Senior Hurling Championship (3) 1919, 1937, 1938
- South Tipperary Junior Hurling Championship Winners (1) 1978
- South Tipperary Under-21 B Hurling Championship (5) 1990, 1993, 1997, 2001, 2025
- South Tipperary Minor Hurling Championship (2) 1932, 1941
- South Tipperary Minor B Hurling Championship (3) 1987, 1996, 2007

== Notable players ==
- Glen Burke
