= Cahir GAA =

Gaelic sports club in County Tipperary, Ireland

- CLG na Cathrach
- Founded: 1885
- County: Tipperary
- Nickname: The Slashers
- Colours: Green and White
- Grounds: The Park / Duneske
- Coordinates: 52°22′20.23″N 7°55′26.90″W

Playing kits
Standard colours

Senior Club Championships
| | All Ireland | Munster champions | Tipperary champions |
|---|---|---|---|
| Football: | - | - | 1 |

Cahir GAA is a Gaelic Athletic Association club in the parish of Cahir, County Tipperary, Ireland. It is a dual club, with more success in football. Cahir has fielded GAA teams since 1885. The club competes in fixtures organised by the South Tipperary divisional board and Tipperary county board.

== Football ==
Cahir fields Gaelic Football teams at both Senior and Junior A level. Their greatest success at senior level came in 2003 when they defeated Ardfinnnan to claim the County Senior Football Championship.

=== Honours ===
- Tipperary Senior Football Championship (1) 2003
- South Tipperary Senior Football Championship (3) 1959 (as Cahir Slashers), 2001, 2003
- Tipperary Intermediate Football Championship (2) 1979, 1998
- South Tipperary Intermediate Football Championship (2) 1979, 1998
- Tipperary Junior A Football Championship (3): 1952, 1955, 1958 (all as Cahir Slashers)
- South Tipperary Junior A Football Championship (5): 1944, 1952, 1955, 1958 (all as Cahir Slashers), 2000
- Tipperary Junior B Football Championship (1) 1995
- South Tipperary Junior B Football Championship (1) 1995
- South Tipperary Under-21 Football Championship (3) 1974 (with Moyle Rovers, 1996, 2019
- Tipperary Under-21 B Football Championship (3) 1989, 2014, 2016,
- South Tipperary Under-21 B Football Championship (4) 1989, 1995, 2014, 2016,2017
- Tipperary Minor A Football (1) 1996
- South Tipperary Minor A Football Championship (3) 1996, 2000, 2018
- Tipperary Minor B Football Championship (2) 2004, 2008
- South Tipperary Minor B Football Championship (4) 1992, 2004, 2008, 2012

=== Notable players ===
- Liam Casey
- Robbie Costigan
- Benny Hickey

== Hurling ==
Cahir fields Junior hurling teams.

=== Honours ===
- South Tipperary Intermediate Hurling Championship (5) 1969, 1987, 1988, 1995, 1996
- South Tipperary Junior A Hurling Championship (2) 1967, 1977
- South Tipperary Junior B Hurling Championship (3) 1995, 2012,2020
- South Tipperary Under-21 A Hurling Championship (2) 1969, 1984 (with Ballybacon-Grange)
- Tipperary Under-21 B Hurling Championship (1) 2000,
- South Tipperary Under-21 B Hurling Championship (2) 1996, 2000,2017
- South Tipperary Minor Hurling Championship (1) 1944 (as Cahir Slashers)
- South Tipperary Minor B Hurling Championship (3) 1984 (with Ballybacon-Grange), 1995, 2000,2020

== Ladies football ==
The Ladies Football Club in Cahir is one of the most successful in Tipperary. It fields teams at U12, U14, U16, Minor, Junior and Intermediate levels. In 2004, the Cahir U14 Girls won the Féile Peil Na nÓg Division 3 final. In 2007, the Cahir U12 Girls won the Health Service Executive (HSE) sponsored Community Games national final. Also in 2007, 2008 and 2009 the Cahir U14 Ladies have reached the Féile Final for three consecutive seasons, narrowly missing out on the All-Ireland title each year. In 2010, the U14 girls won the Division 3 final, meeting Shane O’Neill's of Camlough, County Armagh in the final.

== Camogie ==
The camogie club in Cahir holds a number of county titles. The U12 team have won a county 'A' title. In 2009, the U14 girls team won the HSE Community Games county title. They also reached the Munster Final which they lost by one point to Douglas of Cork who went on to win the national title. In 2010, the U14 girls team won the HSE Community Games county title and the Munster final. They went on to the national finals where they defeated Claregalway in the semi-final and Lucan Sarsfields in the final, becoming All-Ireland champions.
