= Arravale Rovers GAA =

Gaelic games club in County Tipperary, Ireland

Arravale Rovers
- Fánaithe Gleann Árann
- Founded: 1885
- County: Tipperary
- Nickname: The Rovers
- Colours: Black and amber
- Grounds: Sean Treacy Park, Tipperary Town
- Coordinates: 52°28′08.57″N 8°09′27.01″W

Playing kits
Standard colours

Senior Club Championships
	All Ireland	Munster champions	Tipperary champions
Football:	1	1	6

Arravale Rovers GAA (Irish: Fánaithe Gleann Árann) is Gaelic Athletic Association (GAA) club in County Tipperary, Ireland. Based in the town of Tipperary, it competes at senior level in Tipperary GAA county and divisional hurling and Gaelic football championships and leagues. Now part of the West Division of Tipperary GAA, it formerly played in the South Division Up to 1930. The Club has an illustrious history and was one of the leading clubs during the foundation era of the GAA, winning the All-Ireland Men’s Senior Football Championship in its formative years.

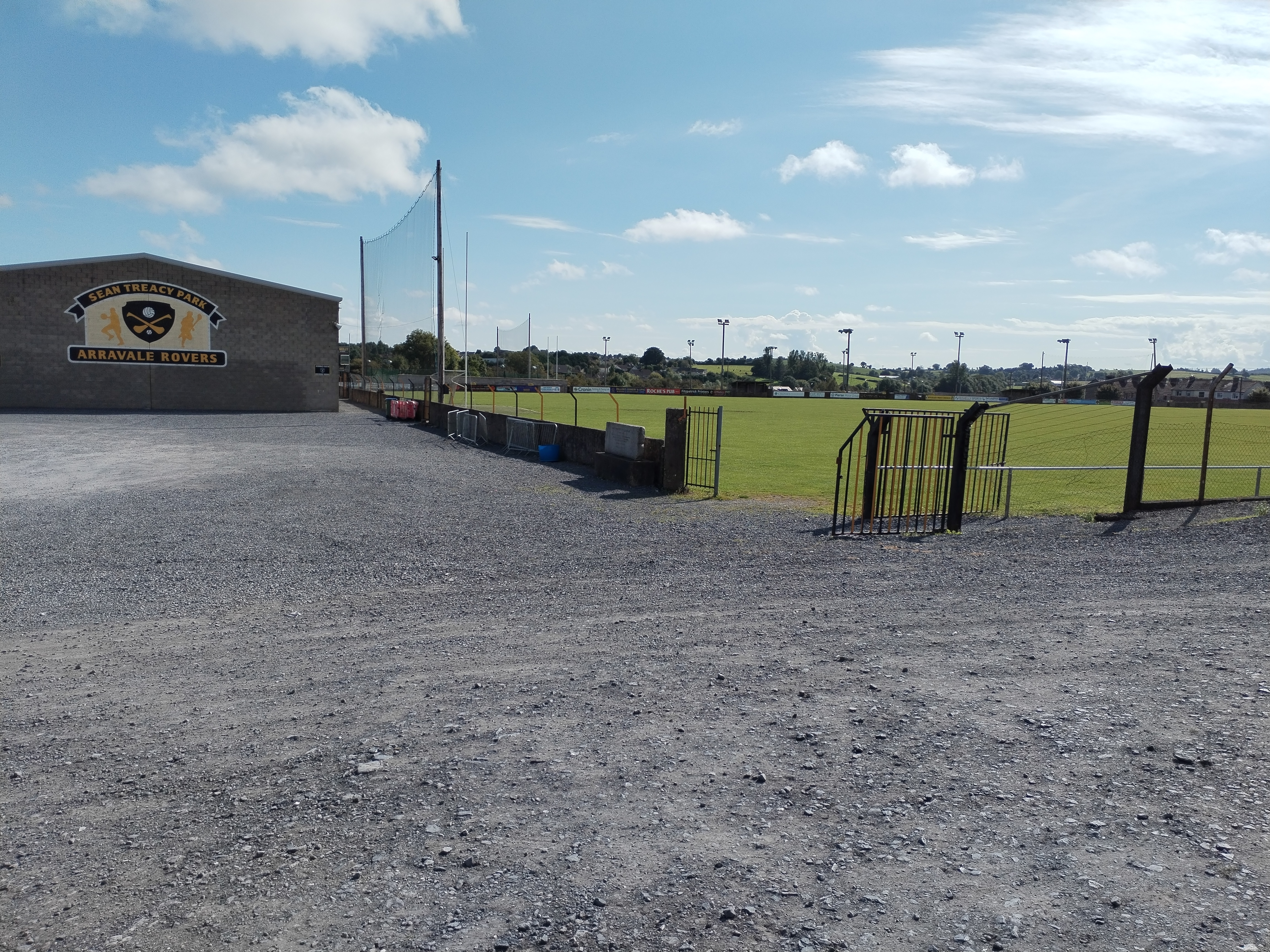
Sean Treacy Park in 2023

== History ==
The club was founded in 1885, a year after the formation of the GAA and within 10 years were All-Ireland Senior Football Champions. During their first decade, it was said that Tipperary Town had the strongest clubs in Ireland due to the presence of Bohercrowe and Rosanna. Bohercrowe winning the All-Ireland SFC in 1889, thus paving the way for Arravale's glorious year of 1895.

== Gaelic football ==
In 1895, Arravale Rovers won the All-Ireland Men’s Football Final, representing Tipperary. This was the first football final played at Jones' Road (later Croke Park).

In 2011 Arravale Rovers beat Éire Óg Annacarty by 1-7 to 0-7 to win the West Tipperary Senior Football Championship for the first time since 1993. The Title was lost in 2012 to Éire Óg, Annacarty who won their first Divisional title in that year. However, Rovers came good again in 2013 when defeating old rivals, Galtee Rovers of Bansha in the final, played at Lattin. This win brought the club's tally in the Divisional Senior Football Championship roll of honour to 11, including the often disputed victory of 1942 which the club always claim to have won, though a scarcity of records give credence to the notion that they were the only team affiliated at senior level in that season. The Club also won further championships in 2015 and 2017 has now surpassed the Lattin-Cullen Club near the top of the honours list, with Galtee Rovers topping the roll of honour with 25 wins.

=== Honours ===
- All-Ireland Senior Football Championship (1)
  - 1895
- Munster Senior Football Championship (1)
  - 1895
- Tipperary Senior Football Championship (6)
  - 1894, 1895, 1896, 1899, 1941, 1985
- Tipperary Intermediate Football Championship (2)
  - 1988, 2007
- Tipperary Junior Football Championship (1)
  - 1997
- Tipperary Under-21 Football Championship (3)
  - 1972, 1973, 2011
- Tipperary Under-21 'B' Football Championship (1)
  - 2002
- Tipperary Minor Football Championship (11)
  - 1933, 1959, 1966, 1972, 1980, 1986, 1988, 1991, 1997, 2004, 2007
- West Tipperary Senior Football Championship (14)
  - 1942, 1948, 1955, 1972, 1973, 1981, 1984, 1992, 1993, 2011, 2013, 2015, 2017, 2022.
- South Tipperary Senior Football Championship (2)
  - 1936, 1941
- West Tipperary Junior Football Championship (9)
  - 1933, 1945, 1953, 1965, 1980, 1986, 1987, 1988, 1997
- Tipperary Junior B Football Championship (1)
  - 2016
- West Tipperary Junior 'B' Football Championship (2)
  - 2008, 2016
- West Tipperary Under-21 Football Championship (16)
  - 1959, 1971, 1972, 1973, 1987, 1988, 1989, 1994, 2005, 2009, 2010, 2011, 2012, 2013, 2016 & 2019
- West Tipperary U-21 'B' Football Championship (1)
  - 2002
- West Tipperary Minor Football Championship (25)
  - 1933, 1942, 1954, 1955, 1957, 1959, 1964, 1967, 1969, 1972, 1980, 1986, 1988, 1991, 1992, 1997, 2002, 2004, 2005, 2006, 2007, 2008, 2009, 2010, 2013
- South Tipperary Minor Football Championship (3)
  - 1934, 1939, 1949
- Tipperary Man's Cup County Senior Football League (1)
  - 1936
- West Tipperary Senior Football League (O'Donoghue Cup) (6)
  - 1973, 1975, 1987, 1992, 1993, 2004
- West Tipperary Junior Football League (2)
  - 1984, 1985

Ladies’ Gaelic football

Arravale Rovers fields ladies’ Gaelic football teams at adult and underage levels. The club’s involvement in ladies’ football dates back to at least 2001, when it entered the Tipperary Junior Championship and fielded an under-16 team for the first time.

The adult team won the Tipperary Junior D League in 2016, followed by the Junior B Plate in 2017. At underage level, Arravale Rovers won the Tipperary Division A Féile Peile na nÓg title for the first time in 2019, qualifying to represent the county at the national Féile competition in Galway.

In September 2020, Arravale Rovers won the Tipperary Junior C Championship, defeating Moyle Rovers by 6-9 to 4-5. The club subsequently won the county under-19 A championship in 2024, defeating Templemore by 1-12 to 2-7.

In October 2026, the adult team won the Tipperary Junior A Championship, defeating Lattin-Cullen/Emly by 2-12 to 2-6. The team progressed to the Munster Junior Club Championship final after victories over Dungarvan of Waterford in the quarter-final and Fergus Rovers of Clare in the semi-final.

Honours

● Tipperary Junior D League: 2016

● Tipperary Junior B Plate: 2017

● Tipperary Division A Féile Peile na nÓg: 2019

● Tipperary Junior C Championship: 2020

● Tipperary Under-19 A Championship: 2024

● Tipperary Junior A Championship: 2026

== Hurling ==
In 1997, Arravale Rovers won the Tipperary Intermediate Hurling Championship final with a very experienced team which had challenged for a number of years before. A period followed without success. In 2009 the Rovers reached the Intermediate county final against Carrick Davins, but lost 1-13 to 1-6. They also reached the Minor hurling final against Loughmore-Castleiney.

=== Honours ===
- Tipperary Intermediate Hurling Championship (2)
  - 1997, 2026
- Tipperary Junior Hurling Championship (2)
  - 1926, 2020
- Tipperary Minor B Hurling Championship (1)
  - 2012
- West Tipperary Senior Hurling Championship (2)
  - 1966, 1970
- West Tipperary Intermediate Hurling Championship (8)
  - 1986, 1988, 1989, 1991, 1995, 1997, 2013, 2026
- West Tipperary Junior Hurling Championship (3)
  - 1934, 1964, 2020
- South Tipperary Junior Hurling Championship (1)
  - 1926 (amalgamation with Solohead)
- West Tipperary Junior No. 2 Hurling Championship (1)
  - 1958
- West Tipperary Junior 'B' Hurling Championship (1)
  - 2011
- West Tipperary Under-21 Hurling Championship (2)
  - 1959, 2011
- West Tipperary Under-21 'B' Hurling Championship (1)
  - 2004
- West Tipperary Minor Hurling Championship (4)
  - 1933, 1958, 2006, 2009
- West Tipperary Minor B Hurling Championship (4)
  - 1984, 1996, 2011, 2012

=== Notable players ===
- John O'Donoghue (hurler)
- Johnny Ryan: All-Ireland Senior Hurling Championship winner, 2025
