= Tipperary Senior Football Championship =

Irish Gaelic football league

- Current season or competition: 2026 Tipperary Senior Football Championship
- Irish: Comórtas Péil Sínsear Thiobráid Árainn
- Founded: 1886
- Title holders: Loughmore–Castleiney (17th title)
- Most titles: Clonmel Commercials (22 titles)
- Sponsors: Clean Ireland

The Tipperary Senior Football Championship is an annual Gaelic Athletic Association club competition between the top Gaelic football clubs in Tipperary. The winners of the Tipperary Championship qualify to represent their county in the Munster Senior Club Football Championship, the winners of which advance to the All-Ireland Senior Club Football Championship.

== History ==
Over the decades, the Tipperary championship has been dominated by teams from South Tipperary, with Fethard and Clonmel Commercials leading the roll of honour, though Loughmore-Castleiney from Mid Tipperary strongly challenge and were the 2014 champions. Kilruane MacDonagh's were North Tipperary's last club team to be victorious in 1975, while teams from West Tipperary have also figured in the honours list, including Aherlow who won their first championship in 2006. Other teams from the West to have won the championship include Galtee Rovers and Arravale Rovers, champions in 1985. The latter were promoted from Intermediate level for 2008, thus providing Tipperary Town with a senior team once again. Clonmel, a town a population of about 20,000 people, now has three senior clubs, Commercials, with Moyle Rovers located in the outer suburban fringe. A more recently formed club, Clonmel Óg, first contested the senior championships in 2009, having won the Intermediate Championship in 2008.

Over the years, prominent senior football clubs have included Fethard, Clonmel Commercials, Moyle Rovers, Ardfinnan, Grangemockler, Kilsheelan and Cahir from South Tipperary. Western teams who are consistent participants in the championship include Aherlow, Arravale Rovers, Eire Og, Anacarty and Galtee Rovers. Loughmore-Castleiney and J.K. Bracken's have the most wins in the division with Moyne-Templetuohy following closely behind. The champions in 2005 were Ardfinnan who made a winning return to the roll of honour after an absence of 31 years, while 2006 saw divisional champions, Aherlow, lift the West Tipperary trophy for the first time.

In 2007, Moyle Rovers triumphed once again. The 2008 final saw Galtee Rovers defeat Cahir to bring the title back to Bansha after an absence of 27 years, but their reign was short-lived and Moyle Rovers restored the South's supremacy in 2009 with their win over West champions, Aherlow on 25 October at Semple Stadium. However, Aherlow came back for victory in 2010, taking the laurels from Loughmore-Castleiney in the final. The 2011 championship was unique in that for the first time, it was won by Thomas MacDonagh's, a combination team representing nine clubs in the North Tipperary Division. They won the title from Moyle Rovers in the final in Cashel on 6 November 2011. It was the first time in 36 years that the title went North, the last victorious team from the region being Kilruane MacDonagh's in 1975. However, MacDonagh's relinquished their title in 2012 when Clonmel Commercials returned as champions for the 15th time, thus bridging a 10-year gap since their last victory.

2013 saw the Loughmore-Castleiney club win the Senior Football Championship for the 12th time and also won the Senior Hurling Championship - thus becoming the first club to win both championships in the same year. Loughmore-Castleiney's victory came at Semple Stadium on Sunday, 3 November, when their three-goal tally saw off the challenge of Aherlow Gaels which is a combination team representing the Aherlow and Lattin-Cullen clubs in West Tipperary. The 2014 county championship was decided on St. Stephens Day following a replayed county final when the Loughmore-Casteleiny club successfully defended their title against a Cahir team on a score of 0–9 to 2–2.

In 2015, Clonmel Commercials won the Tipperary title for the 16th time before advancing to win a coveted Munster title, the first for the county. Their journey continued to the All-Ireland Final where they were defeated by Ballyboden St. Enda's of Dublin.

== Top winners ==
#	Team	Wins	Years won
1	Clonmel Commercials	22	1944, 1948, 1956, 1965, 1966, 1967, 1969, 1971, 1982, 1986, 1989, 1990, 1994, 2002, 2012, 2015, 2017, 2019, 2020, 2022, 2023, 2025
2	Fethard	21	1887, 1917, 1918, 1919, 1920, 1922, 1923, 1924, 1927, 1928, 1938, 1942, 1954, 1957, 1978, 1984, 1988, 1991, 1993, 1997, 2001
3	Loughmore-Castleiney	17	1914, 1940, 1946, 1955, 1973, 1977, 1979, 1983, 1987, 1992, 2004, 2013, 2014, 2016, 2021, 2024, 2026
4	Grangemockler/Ballyneale	8	1890, 1903, 1904, 1905, 1906, 1907, 1909, 1931
4	Clonmel Shamrocks	8	1897, 1898, 1899, 1900, 1901, 1933, 1934, 1937
4	Ardfinnan	8	1935, 1939, 1962, 1963, 1964, 1970, 1974, 2005
5	Moyle Rovers	8	1995, 1996, 1998, 1999, 2000, 2007, 2009, 2018
6	Arravale Rovers	6	1894, 1895, 1896, 1899, 1941, 1985
6	Galtee Rovers	6	1949, 1950, 1976, 1980, 1981, 2008
7	Mullinahone	5	1912, 1913, 1916, 1926, 1929
8	Kilsheelan	4	1930, 1932, 1968, 1972
9	St. Flannan's (North Selection)	3	1958, 1959, 1961
10	Bohercrowe	2	1888, 1889
10	Nenagh	2	1911, 1915
10	Templemore Éire Óg	2	1925, 1936
10	10th Battalion Templemore	2	1943, 1945
10	St Patrick's (Drangan/Cloneen)	2	1947, 1953
10	Aherlow	2	2006, 2010
11	Tipperary Town	1	1902
11	Cloneen	1	1908
11	Tipperary O'Leary's	1	1910
11	Old Bridge	1	1952
11	Thurles Crokes	1	1960
11	Ballingarry	1	1951
11	Kilruane MacDonagh's	1	1975
11	Cahir	1	2003
11	Thomas MacDonagh's	1	2011

== Finals ==
Year	Winner	Score	Runner-up	Score	Man of the Match
2026	Loughmore-Castleiney	0-15	Clonmel Commercials	0-13	Liam McGrath
2025	Clonmel Commercials	1-26	Kilsheelan–Kilcash	1-05	
2024	Loughmore-Castleiney	0–11	Clonmel Commercials	0–07	Liam McGrath
2023	Clonmel Commercials	6-07	JK Brackens	2-06	
2022	Clonmel Commercials	1-10	Upperchurch-Drombane	1-02	Jack Kennedy
2021	Loughmore-Castleiney	1–12	Clonmel Commercials	1–11	John McGrath
2020	Clonmel Commercials	1–16	Loughmore-Castleiney	1–15	
2019	Clonmel Commercials	3–19	J.K. Bracken's	0-07	Kevin Fahey
2018	Moyle Rovers	1–15	Ardfinnan	1-07	Peter Acheson
2017	Clonmel Commercials	2-09	Killenaule	0-08	Michael Quinlivan
2016 (Replay)	Loughmore-Castleiney	1-09	Moyle Rovers	1-06	Cian Hennessy
2015	Clonmel Commercials	1–12	Moyle Rovers	3-05	Séamus Kennedy
2014	Loughmore-Castleiney	2-07, 0–09 (R)	Cahir	1–10, 2–02 (R)	John McGrath
2013	Loughmore-Castleiney	3–10	Aherlow Gaels (Aherlow/Lattin-Cullen)	0-09	John McGrath
2012	Clonmel Commercials	1-09	Thomas MacDonagh's	0-05	Colman Kennedy
2011	Thomas MacDonagh's	0-09	Moyle Rovers	0-07	Philip Austin
2010	Aherlow	2-04	Loughmore-Castleiney	1-06	Barry Grogan
2009	Moyle Rovers	3-06	Aherlow	1–11	Declan Browne
2008	Galtee Rovers	0-07	Cahir	0-05	
2007	Moyle Rovers	1-09	Fethard	0-04	
2006	Aherlow	2–10	Moyle Rovers	0-05	
2005	Ardfinnan	1-05	Loughmore-Castleiney	1-04	
2004	Loughmore-Castleiney	0-09	Moyle Rovers	0-06	
2003	Cahir	0-07	Ardfinnan	0-04	Benny Hickey
2002	Clonmel Commercials	1–14	Aherlow	1-05	Fergal O’Callaghan
2001	Fethard	1–13	Aherlow	0-08	Tommy Sheehan
2000	Moyle Rovers		Loughmore-Castleiney		
1999	Moyle Rovers		Clonmel Commercials		
1998	Moyle Rovers	3-12	Ardfinnan	1-08	
1997	Fethard		Aherlow		Tommy Sheehan
1996	Moyle Rovers		Clonmel Commercials		
1995	Moyle Rovers		Clonmel Commercials		
1994	Clonmel Commercials		Loughmore-Castleiney		
1993	Fethard		Loughmore-Castleiney		Brian Burke
1992	Loughmore-Castleiney		Fethard		
1991	Fethard		Clonmel Commercials		Tommy Sheehan
1990	Clonmel Commercials		Loughmore-Castleiney		
1989	Clonmel Commercials		Fethard		
1988	Fethard		Clonmel Commercials		
1987	Loughmore-Castleiney		Clonmel Commercials		
1986	Clonmel Commercials		Fethard		
1985	Arravale Rovers		Loughmore-Castleiney		
1984	Fethard		Clonmel Commercials		
1983	Loughmore-Castleiney		Fethard		
1982	Clonmel Commercials		Fethard		
1981	Galtee Rovers		Kilsheelan		
1980	Galtee Rovers	0–11	Loughmore-Castleiney	0–10	
1979	Loughmore-Castleiney		Galtee Rovers		
1978	Fethard		Galtee Rovers		
1977	Loughmore-Castleiney		Galtee Rovers		
1976	Galtee Rovers	2-07	Arravale Rovers	0-02	
1975	Kilruane MacDonagh's		Loughmore-Castleiney		
1974	Ardfinnan		Fethard		
1973	Loughmore-Castleiney		Ardfinnan		
1972	Kilsheelan		Ardfinnan		
1971	Clonmel Commercials	2-08	Ardfinnan	1-09	
1970	Ardfinnan	1-11	Clonmel Commercials	2-02	
1969	Clonmel Commercials	2-13	Ardfinnan	0-13	
1968	Kilsheelan		Ardfinnan		
1967	Clonmel Commercials		Ardfinnan		
1966	Clonmel Commercials		Inane Rovers		
1965	Clonmel Commercials		Moneygall		
1964	Ardfinnan		Clonmel Commercials		
1963	Ardfinnan		Templemore		
1962	Ardfinnan		Thurles Crokes		
1961	St. Flannan's		Lattin-Cullen		
1960	Thurles Crokes		Clonmel Commercials		
1959	St. Flannan's		Loughmore-Castleiney		
1958	St. Flannan's		Loughmore-Castleiney		
1957	Fethard		Loughmore-Castleiney		
1956	Clonmel Commercials	3-09	Loughmore-Castleiney	0-07	
1955	Loughmore-Castleiney	3-08	Arravale Rovers	0-06	
1954	Fethard	2-03	Loughmore-Castleiney	2-02	
1953	St Patrick's (Drangan/Cloneen)	0-05	Ballingarry	0-04	
1952	Old Bridge, Clonmel	Awarded Title	Galtee Rovers	withdrew from Final	
1951	Ballingarry	1-05	Galtee Rovers	0-05	
1950	Galtee Rovers	1-08	Templetuohy	1-02	
1949	Galtee Rovers	1-07	Templetuohy	1-02	
1948	Clonmel Commercials	4-05	Loughmore-Castleiney	2-02	
1947	St Patrick's (Drangan/Cloneen)	0-06	Galtee Rovers	0-03	
1946	Loughmore-Castleiney	3-08	Clonmel Commercials	2-06	
1945	Army (10th Battalion)		Mullinahone	1-02	
1944	Clonmel Commercials	1-06	Army (10th Battalion)	1-04	
1943	Army (10th Battalion)	1-07	Fethard	0-03	
1942	Fethard	4-05	Arravale Rovers	1-02	
1941	Arravale Rovers	3-04	Loughmore-Castleiney	0-00	
1940	Loughmore-Castleiney	1-08	Clonmel Shamrocks	0-02	
1939	Ardfinnan	1-03	West Tipperary Selection	1-01	
1938	Fethard	2-08	West Tipperary Selection	1-01	
1937	Clonmel Shamrocks	3-02	Ardfinnan	3-00	
1936	Templemore	2-05	Arravale Rovers	1-06	
1935	Ardfinnan	3-05	Templemore	2-01	
1934	Clonmel Shamrocks				
1933	Clonmel Shamrocks	1-05	Templemore	0-03	
1932	Kilsheelan		Grangemockler		
1931	Grangemockler	(awarded Title)	No teams in Mid, North or West		
1930	Kilsheelan		Grangemockler		
1929	Mullinahone	2-05	Templemore	0-01	
1928	Fethard	1-03	Templemore	0-04	
1927	Fethard		Mid Tipperary Selection		
1926	Mullinahone	3-03	Templemore	0-05	
1925	Templemore	1-04	Fethard	1-01	
1924	Fethard	1-06	Templemore	1-02	
1923	Fethard	3-03	Templemore	0-05	
1922	Fethard	1-04	Templemore	0-00	
1921	No Championship (War of Independence)				
1920	Fethard	2-06	Mullinahone	0-04	
1919	Fethard	3-05	Nenagh	1-00	
1918	Fethard	2-02	The Commons	1-02	
1917	Fethard	4-02	Mullinahone	2-01	
1916	Final Abandoned				
1915	Nenagh	1-02	Castleiney-Templetuohy	1-01	
1914	Castleiney	3-01	Nenagh	1-00	
1913	Mullinahone	4-04	Templemore	0-04	
1912	Mullinahone	1-02	Nenagh	1-01	
1911	Nenagh	2-03	Templetuohy	0-00	
1910	Tipperary O'Leary's		Borris-Ileigh		
1909	Grangemockler	1-05	Clonmel Emmets	2-04	
1908	Cloneen	(awarded Title)	Tipperary O'Leary's		
1907	Grangemockler	3-04	Cashel	0-04	
1906	Grangemockler	2-05	Kilcash	0-05	
1905	Grangemockler	0–11	Kilcash	0-02	
1904	Grangemockler	2-05	Poulacapple	0-06	
1903	Grangemockler	2-05	Poulacapple	1-03	
1902	Tipperary Town	1-08	Kilsheelan	0-03 (Replay)	
1901	Clonmel Shamrocks	1–12	Fethard	0-04	
1900	Clonmel Shamrocks	1-08	Clonmel Commercials	0-04	
1899	Arravale Rovers	0-06 (Awarded Title)	Clonmel Shamrocks	0-06	
1898	Clonmel Shamrocks	0–10	Kilcash	0-01	
1897	Coolmoyne	1-02	Clonmel Shamrocks	0-01	
1896	Arravale Rovers	1-01	Grangemockler	0-03	
1895	Arravale Rovers	4-06	Loughmore	0-01	
1894	Arravale Rovers	1-02	Tipperary Shamrocks	0-00	
1893	No Championship (Due to Parnell Split)				
1892	No Championship (Due to Parnell Split)				
1891	No Championship (Due to Parnell Split)				
1890	Grangemockler				
1889	Bohercrowe	2-07	Carrick	0-00	
1888	Bohercrowe	0-04	Fethard	0-01 (Replay)	
1887	Fethard		N/A		
1886	Templemore		N/A		

=== North Tipperary ===
While there is currently no senior divisional championship, an occasional presence is maintained in the county championship by one or two teams, often representing an amalgamation of junior clubs who play in the divisional junior championship. The senior football championship began in the north in 1908 but it only became competitive/organised in the 1960's. For many years there might only be one team in the north who would go on to represent the division without having played any matches. On other occasions north teams would ply their trade in the other divisions. Past teams have included two-time winners Nenagh, Inane Rovers from Roscrea, St Flannan's and Kilruane MacDonagh's, the latter two having won the county championship on one occasion each. The region received a boost in 2011 when a combination team which drew players from nine clubs, Thomas MacDonagh's GFC, won the County Championship; a feat last achieved in 1975, when the other MacDonagh's from Kilruane were champions.

Year	Winner	Score	Runner-up	Score
2000	No Championship			
1999	No Championship			
1998	Nenagh Éire Óg	3-17	Borrisokane/Inane	2-04
1997	No Championship			
1996	No Championship			
1995	Nenagh Éire Óg	1-07 (4-19)	Borrisokane	1-07 (3-13)
1994	Nenagh Éire Óg	4-12	St. Brendan's	0-04
1993	St. Brendan's	4-05	Nenagh Éire Óg	1-11
1992	Nenagh Éire Óg	4-10	Newport	0-06
1991	Nenagh Éire Óg	2-09	Newport	2-07
1990	Newport	1-11	Nenagh Éire Óg	1-03
1989	Nenagh Éire Óg	1-05	Newport	1-01
1988	Newport	0-05 (2-04)	Borrisokane	0-05 (0-05)
1987	Newport	1-07	Kilruane MacDonagh's	0-07
1986	Newport	3-13	Lorrha-Dorrha	0-01
1985	Wolfe Tones	1-08	Kilruane MacDonagh's	2-04
1984	St. Ruadhan's	1-05	Kilruane MacDonagh's	1-04
1983	Lorrha-Dorrha	(1-07)	Kilruane MacDonagh's	(1-02)
1982	Mulcaire Rovers	0-05	St. Ruadhan's	0-04
1981	Kilruane MacDonagh's	1-05 (0-09)	Silvermines	0-08 (2-01)
1980	Silvermines	1-04	St. Ruadhan's	1-02
1979	Kilruane MacDonagh's	1-04	Silvermines	0-06
1978	No Championship			
1977	Kilruane MacDonagh's	0-08	Silvermines	0-06
1976	Kilruane MacDonagh's	0-08	Silvermines	0-06
1975	Silvermines	3-06	Moneygall	0-05
1974	Silvermines	2-05	Moneygall	1-05
1973	Silvermines	1-10	Kilruane MacDonagh's	1-03
1972	Kilruane MacDonagh's	0-11	Silvermines	1-04
1971	No Championship			
1970	No Championship			
1969	No Championship			
1968	No Championship			
1967	No Championship			
1966	Inane Rovers	-	Newport	-
1965	Moneygall	1-04	Inane Rovers	0-04
1964	St. Flannan's	2-02	Inane Rovers	0-01
1963	St. Flannan's	-	Inane Rovers	-
1962	No Championship			
1961	St. Flannan's	3-08	Borris-Ileigh	1-03

=== Mid Tipperary ===
The Mid Tipperary Senior Football Championship is generally contested by three teams: J.K. Bracken's of Templemore, Loughmore-Castleiney and Moyne-Templetuohy. The following is a list of winners of the Mid Tipperary Championship.

==== Roll of Honour ====
#	Team	Wins	Years won
1	Loughmore–Castleiney	63	1914, 1915, 1919, 1940, 1941, 1946, 1947, 1948, 1951, 1954, 1955, 1956, 1957, 1958, 1959, 1965, 1966, 1967, 1968, 1969, 1970, 1971, 1972, 1973, 1974, 1975, 1976, 1977, 1978, 1979, 1980, 1981, 1982, 1983, 1984, 1985, 1987, 1988, 1989, 1990, 1991, 1992, 1993, 1994, 1995, 1996, 1997, 1998, 1999, 2000, 2003, 2004, 2005, 2007, 2008, 2009, 2010, 2012, 2015, 2016, 2017, 2018, 2023
2	JK Brackens	26	1913, 1916, 1922, 1923, 1924, 1925, 1926, 1927, 1928, 1929, 1934, 1935, 1936, 1937, 1938, 1939, 1942, 1963, 1964, 2002, 2006, 2011, 2013, 2014, 2019, 2021
3	Moyne–Templetuohy	6	1911, 1912, 1949, 1950, 1986, 2001
4	10th Battalion, Army, Templemore	3	1943, 1944, 1945
4	Thurles Crokes	3	1960, 1961, 1962
6	Thurles	2	1908, 1909
6	Mullinahone	2	1917, 1930
8	Borrisoleigh	1	1910
8	The Commons	1	1918
8	Thurles Sarsfields	1	1952
8	Ballingarry	1	1953

==== List of Finals ====
Year	Winner	Score	Runner-up	Score
2023	Loughmore-Castleiney	1–05	Upperchurch-Drombane	0–07
2022	J.K. Bracken's	0–09	Loughmore-Castleiney	0–08
2021	No Championship			
2020	No Championship			
2019	J.K. Bracken's	3-08	Loughmore-Castleiney	1–10
2018	Loughmore-Castleiney	1–12	Upperchurch-Drombane	1-09
2017	Loughmore-Castleiney	0–17	Upperchurch-Drombane	0-06
2016	Loughmore-Castleiney	1–11	Upperchurch-Drombane	1-08
2015	Loughmore-Castleiney	1–16	Drom-Inch	3-09
2014	J.K. Bracken's	0–17	Moyne-Templetuohy	0–11
2013	J.K. Bracken's	2–10	Loughmore-Castleiney	1-09
2012	Loughmore-Castleiney	2-08	J.K. Bracken's	1–10
2011	J.K. Bracken's	2-07	Loughmore-Castleiney	1-09
2010	Loughmore-Castleiney	1–11	J.K. Bracken's	0–11
2009	Loughmore-Castleiney	2–12	J.K. Bracken's	0-08
2008	Loughmore-Castleiney	2-09	Moyne-Templetuohy	1-08
2007	Loughmore-Castleiney	1-07	Moyne-Templetuohy	1-06
2006	J.K. Bracken's	1-09	Loughmore-Castleiney	0-09
2005	Loughmore-Castleiney	0–12	J.K. Bracken's	0–10
2004	Loughmore-Castleiney	0–14	J.K. Bracken's	0-06
2003	Loughmore-Castleiney	0–13	J.K. Bracken's	0-06
2002	J.K. Bracken's	2-07	Loughmore-Castleiney	1-03
2001	Moyne-Templetuohy	1-09	Loughmore-Castleiney	0-09
2000	Loughmore-Castleiney	1-05 (1–12)	J.K. Bracken's	0-08 (2-06)
1999	Loughmore-Castleiney	0–07	J.K. Bracken's	0–01
1998	Loughmore-Castleiney	3–10	J.K. Bracken's	1–04
1997	Loughmore-Castleiney	0–12	Gortnahoe Gaels	1–06
1996	Loughmore-Castleiney	3–08	J.K. Bracken's	2–05
1995	Loughmore-Castleiney	1–11	St. Kevin's	2–07
1994	Loughmore-Castleiney	2–07	Peil Durlas	1–09
1993	Loughmore-Castleiney	1–09	Oliver Plunketts	0–05
1992	Loughmore-Castleiney	1-07	Oliver Plunketts	1-04
1991	Loughmore-Castleiney	w/o	Na Fianna	conc.
1990	Loughmore-Castleiney	1–09	Thurles Crokes	1–06
1989	Loughmore-Castleiney	5–10	Templemore	1–02
1988	Loughmore-Castleiney	0–10	Templemore	0–02
1987	Loughmore-Castleiney	1–09	Moyne-Templetuohy	0–06
1986	Moyne-Templetuohy	1–06	Loughmore-Castleiney	0–08
1985	Loughmore-Castleiney	1–07	Templemore	0–06
1984	Loughmore-Castleiney	1–08	Moyne-Templetuohy	1–05
1983	Loughmore-Castleiney	4–11	Moycarkey-Borris	2–02
1982	Loughmore-Castleiney	0–10	Moyne-Templetuohy	0–07
1981	Loughmore-Castleiney	4–12	Moycarkey-Borris	0–04
1980	Loughmore-Castleiney	2-7	Templemore	0-4
1979	Loughmore-Castleiney	4-6	Templemore	2-0
1978	Loughmore-Castleiney	1-9	Templemore	2-4
1977	Loughmore-Castleiney	1-7	Templemore	1-6
1976	Loughmore-Castleiney	1-11	Templemore	2-5
1975	Loughmore-Castleiney	0-8	Templemore	2-1
1974	Loughmore-Castleiney	W/O	Templemore	SCR
1973	Loughmore-Castleiney	8-10	Templemore	2-1
1972	Loughmore-Castleiney	2-11	Templemore	0-4
1971	Loughmore-Castleiney	1-10	Moneygall	0-11
1970	Loughmore-Castleiney	2-3	Moneygall	0-6
1969	Loughmore-Castleiney	2-7	Moneygall	1-9
1968	Loughmore-Castleiney	2-7	Templetuohy-Moyne	0-9
1967	Loughmore-Castleiney		Templemore	
1966	Loughmore-Castleiney	0-8	Templetuohy-Moyne	0-6
1965	Loughmore-Castleiney	0-8	Templemore	0-4
1964	Templemore	1-5	Loughmore-Castleiney	1-3
1963	Templemore	1-6	Loughmore-Castleiney	1-4
1962	Thurles Crokes	3-7	Templemore	1-7
1961	Thurles Crokes	2-5	Loughmore-Castleiney	0-3
1960	Thurles Crokes	2-3	Loughmore	0-3
1959	Loughmore	3-3	Castleiney	1-5
1958	Loughmore	2-6	Templemore	1-7
1957	Loughmore	3-11	Thurles Sarsfields	0-5
1956	Loughmore	1-4	Thurles Sarsfields	0-2
1955	Loughmore	0-9	Holycross-Boherlahan	0-2
1954	Loughmore	1-5	Boherlahan	2-0
1953	Ballingarry	1-5	Loughmore-Castleiney	0-5
1952	Thurles Sarsfields	1-4	Boherlahan	1-1
1951	Loughmore-Castleiney	2-8	Templetuohy	0-0
1950	Templetuohy	1-1	Thurles Sarsfields	0-2
1949	Templetuohy-Moyne	1-3	Loughmore-Castleiney	0-3
1948	Loughmore-Castleiney	3-7	Templetuohy-Moyne	2-2
1947	Loughmore-Castleiney	5-5	Templetuohy-Moyne	0-3
1946	Loughmore-Castleiney	1-4	Templemore	0-6
1945	10th Battalion, Army, Templemore	1-7	Thurles Sarsfields	0-1
1944	10th Battalion, Army, Templemore	0-6	Thurles Sarsfields	0-2
1943	10th Battalion, Army, Templemore	2-2	Loughmore-Castleiney	1-2
1942	Templemore	1-7	Loughmore-Castleiney	2-2
1941	Loughmore-Castleiney	0-5	Templetuohy	0-0
1940	Loughmore-Castleiney	W/O	Templemore Colmcilles	SCR
1939	Templemore			
1938	Templemore	3-5	Baile na dTeach	0-1
1937	No Championship			
1936	Templemore	2-5	Ballinree Rovers	1-0
1935	Templemore	3-2	Loughmore	0-2
1934	No Championship			
1933	No Championship			
1932	No Championship			
1931	No Championship			
1930	Mullinahone	0-4	Templemore	0-2
1929	No Championship			
1928	Templemore			
1927	Templemore	3-10	Thurles	0-0
1926	No Championship			
1925	No Championship			
1924	Templemore-Castleiney	W/O	Thurles	SCR
1923	No Championship			
1922	No Championship			
1921	No Championship			
1920	No Championship			
1919	Castleiney-Templetuohy	1-2	Templemore	1-1
1918	The Commons	1-2	Templemore	1-1
1917	Mullinahone	0-4	Castleiney-Templetuohy	0-0
1916	Templemore	0-2	Castleiney-Templetuohy	0-0
1915	Castleiney			
1914	Castleiney	3-2	Templemore	0-1
1913	Templemore	0-1	Thurles	0-0
1912	Templetuohy	3-0	Thurles	2-1
1911	Templetuohy	3-0	Thurles	2-1
1910	Borrisoleigh	0-4	Cappawhite	0-3
1909	Thurles Mitchels	3-10	Castleiney	1-0
1908	Thurles			

=== West Tipperary ===
The West Tipperary Championship has been contested by the same four teams in recent years: Aherlow Gaels (Aherlow & Lattin/Cullen), Éire Óg Annacarty, Galtee Rovers and Arravale Rovers with Galtee Rovers winning their 26th title in 2018 to consolidate their place at the top of the roll of honour which they have maintained since their inaugural win in the championship of 1947. Since 2008, the championship has been a round-robin affair with the top teams qualifying for the final. In some years, the emerging champions also advanced to the quarter final of the County Championship. The stranglehold on the championship enjoyed by the Aherlow/Galtee Rovers axis was broken in 2011 and new champions other than these two clubs were crowned for the first time since Knockavilla Kickhams took the laurels in 1998. The 2011 final contestants were Arravale Rovers of Tipperary Town and Éire Óg, Annacarty. However, it was Arravale's turn once again to take the laurels after 18 years, when they were a goal to the good in the final played at Golden on 25 September.

In 2012, Éire Óg won their inaugural championship. However, their reign was short-lived as Arravale Rovers were winners of the 2013 championship, when they saw off Galtee Rovers in one of the few finals to be played at Lattin. Galtee Rovers reached a milestone when they won their 25th title on 3 October 2014 when defeating Éire Óg Anacarty by 4–6 to 0–7 in the final played at Dundrum.

In the early years of the championship, which was inaugurated in 1940 but was not concluded that year, an Arravale Rovers team of the war years, claim to be champions of West Tipperary in 1942, a claim not disputed by the other clubs, though details are scarce on the victory records. Notwithstanding this early episode, Arravale were All-Ireland Senior Football Champions when other clubs were just starting out at the end of the 19th century. The combination team of Aherlow and Lattin-Cullen playing under the banner of Aherlow Gaels won their only championship to date when they prevailed in the 2016 final, producing a goal rush against finalists Galtee Rovers at Dundrum on 25 September 2016. The 2017 Championship saw Arravale Rovers regain the title by a three-point margin the final against Galtee Rovers in the final played in Annacarty. Galtee Rovers were champions again in 2018, defeating Eire Og, Annacarty by 2–8 to 1–7, in the final played at Cappawhite on 14 December. The following is the list of winners of the West Tipperary Senior Football Championship since the inauguration of the championship in 1940 to 2018.

Galtee Rovers: (26) – 1947, 1949, 1950, 1951, 1952, 1953, 1954, 1962, 1963, 1974, 1975, 1976, 1979, 1983, 1985, 1989, 1991, 1999, 2000, 2001, 2002, 2003, 2004, 2008, 2014, 2018.

Arravale Rovers: (13) – 1942, 1948, 1955, 1972, 1973, 1981, 1984, 1992, 1993, 2011, 2013, 2015, 2017.

Lattin-Cullen: (10) – 1958, 1961, 1964, 1965, 1966, 1967, 1969, 1971, 1982, 1994.

Aherlow: (6) – 1997, 2005, 2006, 2007, 2009, 2010.

Solohead: (4) – 1956, 1957, 1970, 1977.

Golden-Kilfeacle: (4) – 1986, 1988, 1995, 1996.

Emly: (3) – 1959, 1960, 1987.

Cappawhite: (1) – 1978.

Cashel King Cormacs: (1) – 1990.

Knockavilla-Donaskeigh Kickhams: (1) – 1998.

St. Ailbe's ( Aherlow & Emly): (1) – 1968.

Golden-Rockwell (Golden/Kilfeacle & Rockwell Rovers): (1) – 1980.

Éire Óg Annacarty: (1) – 2012.

Aherlow Gaels (Aherlow & Lattin-Cullen): (1) – 2016

Year	Winner	Score	Runner-up	Score
2018	Galtee Rovers	2-08	Éire Óg Annacarty	1-07
2017	Arravale Rovers	4–10	Galtee Rovers	2–10
2016	Aherlow Gaels	2–12	Galtee Rovers	1-06
2015	Arravale Rovers	0–12	Éire Óg Annacarty	0-09
2014	Galtee Rovers	4-06	Éire Óg Annacarty	0-07
2013	Arravale Rovers	2-07	Galtee Rovers	0-08
2012	Éire Óg Annacarty	1-09	Arravale Rovers	1-07
2011	Arravale Rovers	1-07	Éire Óg Annacarty	0-07
2010	Aherlow	1-08	Galtee Rovers	1-04
2009	Aherlow	1-07	Galtee Rovers	0-06
2008	Galtee Rovers	1–14	Éire Óg Annacarty	0-07
2007	Aherlow	1–10	Éire Óg Annacarty	1-09
2006	Aherlow	0-08	Galtee Rovers	0-05
2005	Aherlow	0–11	Galtee Rovers	0-08
2004	Galtee Rovers	2-05	Aherlow	0-09
2003	Galtee Rovers	2–12	Éire Óg Annacarty	1-06
2002	Galtee Rovers	1-06 (3–12 R)	Aherlow	0-09 (0–6 R)
2001	Galtee Rovers	1–12	Arravale Rovers	0-07
2000	Galtee Rovers	1-07 (1-05 R)	Aherlow	1-07 (0-05 R)
1999	Galtee Rovers	1–10	Golden-Kilfeacle	0-05
1998	Knockavilla-Donaskeigh Kickhams	0–12	Arravale Rovers	0-04
1997	Aherlow	2-09	Knockavilla-Donaskeigh Kickhams	0–10
1996	Golden-Kilfeacle	2–19	Lattin-Cullen	3-05
1995	Golden-Kilfeacle	0–11 (0-09 R)	Lattin-Cullen	1-08 (0-06 R)
1994	Lattin-Cullen	0–10 (2–19 R)	Galtee Rovers	0–10 (3-08 R)
1993	Arravale Rovers	1-09	Cashel King Cormacs	2-04
1992	Arravale Rovers		Lattin-Cullen	
1991	Galtee Rovers		Arravale Rovers	
1990	Cashel King Cormacs	3–10	Lattin-Cullen	0-08
1989	Galtee Rovers	0-08	Clonoulty-Rossmore	1-04
1988	Golden-Kilfeacle		Galtee Rovers	
1987	Emly	1-07	Arravale Rovers	1-05
1986	Golden-Kilfeacle	0–12	Arravale Rovers	0-08
1985	Galtee Rovers		Cappawhite	
1984	Arravale Rovers	6-05	Galtee Rovers	0-08
1983	Galtee Rovers		Solohead	
1982	Lattin-Cullen		Cappawhite	
1981	Arravale Rovers	1-07 (1-06 R)	Solohead	0–10 (0-03 R)
1980	Golden-Rockwell		Cashel King Cormacs	
1979	Galtee Rovers	1–14	Golden-Rockwell	2-06
1978	Cappawhite		Galtee Rovers	
1977	Solohead		Galtee Rovers	
1976	Galtee Rovers		Arravale Rovers	
1975	Galtee Rovers		Solohead	
1974	Galtee Rovers		Solohead	
1973	Arravale Rovers		Galtee Rovers	
1972	Arravale Rovers		Lattin-Cullen	
1971	Lattin-Cullen		Newport	
1970	Solohead		Lattin-Cullen	
1969	Lattin-Cullen		Solohead	
1968	St. Ailbe's		Lattin-Cullen	
1967	Lattin-Cullen		Arravale Rovers	
1966	Lattin-Cullen		Galtee Rovers	
1965	Lattin-Cullen		Galtee Rovers	
1964	Lattin-Cullen		Emly	
1963	Galtee Rovers		Lattin-Cullen	
1962	Galtee Rovers		Rockwell Rovers	
1961	Lattin-Cullen		Galtee Rovers	
1960	Emly		Galtee Rovers	
1959	Emly		Lattin-Cullen	
1958	Lattin-Cullen		Emly	
1957	Solohead		Arravale Rovers	
1956	Solohead		Galtee Rovers	
1955	Arravale Rovers		Rockwell Rovers	
1954	Galtee Rovers		Rockwell Rovers	
1953	Galtee Rovers		Rockwell Rovers	
1952	Galtee Rovers		Rockwell Rovers	
1951	Galtee Rovers			
1950	Galtee Rovers		Clonpet	
1949	Galtee Rovers		Arravale Rovers	
1948	Arravale Rovers		Cashel Area	
1947	Galtee Rovers		Arravale Rovers	
1946	No Championship			
1945	No Championship			
1944	No Championship			
1943	No Championship			
1942	Arravale Rovers		Emly	

=== South Tipperary ===
The South Tipperary Championship is contested by five teams: Ardfinnan, Ballyporeen, Clonmel Commercials, Moyle Rovers, and Kilsheelan-Kilcash.

Year	Winner	Score	Runner-up	Score
2026	Clonmel Commercials	3-16	Grangemockler-Ballyneale	2-16
2025	Clonmel Commercials	3-18	Ballyporeen	2-11
2024	Moyle Rovers	1-08	Clonmel Commercials	0-09
2023	Clonmel Commercials	1-14	Moyle Rovers	1-13
2022	Clonmel Commercials	2-12	Moyle Rovers	0-12
2021	Clonmel Commercials	0-15	Moyle Rovers	1-10
2020	No Championship			
2019	Clonmel Commercials	1-06	Moyle Rovers	0-08
2018	Ardfinnan		Clonmel Commercials	
2017	Moyle Rovers		Clonmel Commercials	
2016	Clonmel Commercials	1–15	Cahir	0-06
2015	Kilsheelan-Kilcash	1–11	Clonmel Commercials	0-06
2014	Killenaule	2-04	Clonmel Commercials	1-06
2013	Clonmel Commercials	1–12	Kilsheelan-Kilcash	0-06
2012	Killenaule	0–17	Moyle Rovers	1–12
2011	Clonmel Commercials	2-06	Moyle Rovers	1-03
2010	Moyle Rovers	2–11	Cahir	1-09
2009	Moyle Rovers	0–14	Fethard	0-08
2008	Moyle Rovers	0-08	Fethard	0-03
2007	Moyle Rovers	2–10	Fethard	0–10
2006	Moyle Rovers	3–14	Grangemockler-Ballyneale	0-02
2005	Fethard	1–20	Carrick Swans	1-04
2004	Clonmel Commercials	2-03	Fethard	1-05
2003	Cahir	1–12	Moyle Rovers	0–14
2002	Fethard	0–13	Moyle Rovers	0-08
2001	Cahir	1-09	Moyle Rovers	1-07
2000	Moyle Rovers	1-08	Ardfinnan	1-04
1999	Moyle Rovers	2–10 (2–17 R)	Fethard	1–13 (0-09 R)
1998	Moyle Rovers	3–14	Ardfinnan	1-09
1997	Fethard	2-07	Ardfinnan	0-09
1996	Moyle Rovers	2–11	Clonmel Commercials	1-07
1995	Moyle Rovers	2–12	Clonmel Commercials	1-07
1994	Clonmel Commercials	0–16	Ardfinnan	1-05
1993	Fethard	1–10	Clonmel Commercials	0-09
1992	Fethard	0–11 (2-08 R)	Clonmel Commercials	1-08 (1-06 R)
1991	Moyle Rovers	0–12	Fethard	1-08
1990	St. Patrick's-Grangemockler	1–10	Clonmel Commercials	1-07
1989	Clonmel Commercials	3–11	Moyle Rovers	0-09
1988	Fethard			
1987	Clonmel Commercials	0–11	Fethard	0–10
1986	Fethard	1–15	Clonmel Commercials	0-06
1985	Fethard	0-09	Clonmel Commercials	1-03
1984	Fethard	2-08	Clonmel Commercials	1-07
1983	Kilsheelan-Kilcash	1–11	Fethard	1–10
1982	Clonmel Commercials	1-04	Kilsheelan-Kilcash	0-02
1981	Clonmel Commercials	2-04 (0–11 R)	Fethard	0–10 (0-05 R)
1980	Fethard	0–11	Cahir	0-04
1979	Fethard	2-09	Clonmel Commercials	0-07
1978	Fethard	1–14	Kilsheelan-Kilcash	2-04
1977	Clonmel Commercials	4–12	Kilsheelan-Kilcash	1-06
1976	Fethard		Kilsheelan-Kilcash	
1975	Clonmel Commercials			
1974	Ardfinnan		Clonmel Commercials	
1973	Ardfinnan			
1972	Clonmel Commercials			
1971	Clonmel Commercials			
1970	Kilsheelan-Kilcash	1-07	Clonmel Commercials	0-07
1969	Fethard			
1968	Ardfinnan			
1967	Clonmel Commercials		Clogheen	
1966	Clonmel Commercials		Ardfinnan	
1965	Clonmel Commercials		Fethard	
1964	Ardfinnan		Clonmel Commercials	
1963	Ardfinnan		Fethard	
1962	Ardfinnan		Burncoat	
1961	Ardfinnan		Clonmel Commercials	
1960	Clonmel Commercials			
1959	Cahir Slashers			
1958	Clonmel Commercials		Fethard	
1957	Fethard			
1956	Clonmel Commercials			
1955	Fethard			
1954	Fethard			
1953	St. Patrick's			
1952	Old Bridge			
1951	Ballingarry			
1950	Fethard			
1949	Clonmel Commercials			
1948	Clonmel Commercials			
1947	St. Patrick's			
1946	Clonmel Commercials			
1945	Mullinahone			
1944	Clonmel Commercials			
1943	Fethard			
1942	Fethard			
1941	Arravale Rovers			
1940	Shamrocks			
1939	Ardfinnan		Clonmel Commercials	
1938	Fethard			
1937	Shamrocks			
1936	Arravale Rovers			
1935	Ardfinnan		Fethard	
1934	Shamrocks			
1933	Kilsheelan-Kilcash		Moyle Rovers	
1932	Shamrocks			
1931	Grangemockler			
1930	Kilsheelan-Kilcash		Mullinahone	
1929	Mullinahone			
1928	Fethard			
1927	Fethard			
1926	Mullinahone			
1925	Fethard			
1924	Fethard			
1923	Fethard			
1922	Fethard			
1921	No Championship			
1920	No Championship			
1919	Mullinahone			
1918	Fethard			
1917	Fethard			
1916	Mullinahone			
1915	Bansha			
1914	Fethard			
1913	Mullinahone			
1909	Grangemockler-Ballyneale			
1908	Cloneen			
1907	Grangemockler-Ballyneale			
1906	Grangemockler-Ballyneale			
1905	Grangemockler-Ballyneale			
1904	Grangemockler-Ballyneale			
1903	Grangemockler-Ballyneale			
1890	Grangemockler-Ballyneale			

The championship is currently a two group competition. The winners of each group go directly into two semi finals, with the 2nd and 3rd placed teams playing off in two quarter finals.
