= Moyle Rovers GAA =

GAA club in Tipperary

- Fanaithe na Maoilig
- Founded: 1928
- County: Tipperary
- Nickname: The Rovers
- Grounds: Monroe
- Coordinates: 52.399277°N 7.692747°W

Playing kits
Standard colours

Senior Club Championships
	All Ireland	Munster champions	Tipperary champions
Football:	-	-	8

Moyle Rovers GAA are a Gaelic Athletic Association club in County Tipperary, Ireland. The club competes in fixtures organised by the South Tipperary divisional board and Tipperary county board.

== History ==
The club derives its name from the river Moyle that runs through the Parish and joins the River Anner. The club was founded in 1928. Previous to this since the 1800s various teams represented the parish in local leagues most often the Clonmel League. Kilsheelan GAA club have recorded games played against Powerstown in the early 1900s.

=== The 1990s ===
==== Football ====
The club's grounds, Monroe, was officially opened in 1990. Soon after in 1991 they won their first South senior football title and in 1995 their first ever County senior football championship final win. Further victories in this grade followed in 1996/98/99/00 along with these Moyle Rovers also won four South Senior football titles; and contested two Munster club finals also. In 2018, Moyle Rovers won their 8th county senior football championship beating Ardfinnan 1–15 to 1–7.

==== Hurling ====
1993 saw the club's junior hurling teams win the South A & B championships. In 1998 the club when they won the County junior "A" hurling championship for the first time.

== Honours ==
=== Football titles ===
- Tipperary Senior Football Championship Winners 1995, 1996, 1998, 1999, 2000, 2007, 2009, 2018
- South Tipperary Senior Football Championship Winners 1991, 1995, 1996, 1998, 1999, 2000, 2006, 2007, 2008, 2009, 2010, 2017,2024
- Clonmel Oil Senior Football League 1991, 1992, 1993,2018,2024
- Tipperary Men's Cup S.F. 1993
- Tipperary S.F.L Div. 1 1993
- Tipperary S.F.L. Dr Clifford Cup (1) 1999
- South Tipperary Intermediate Football Championship (2) 1966, 2012,2020
- South Tipperary Junior A Football Championship Winners (6) 1931, 1959, 1976, 1981, 1989, 1998
- Tipperary Junior A Football Championship (3) 1931, 1959, 1998
- South Tipperary Junior B Football Championship' (2) 2006, 2014 2016
- South Tipperary Junior Football League (1) 1974
- Tipperary Under-21 Football Championship (4) 2007, 2008, 2009, 2017
- South Under-21 A Football Championship (9) 1974 (with Cahir), 1991, 2005, 2007, 2008, 2009, 2011, 2017, 2018
- Tipperary Under-21 B Football Championship (1) 1994,2023
- South Tipperary Under-21 B Football Championship (1) 2004,2023
- Tipperary Minor A Football Championship (4) 1984 (with Grangemockler as Slievenamon), 1987 (with Grangemockler as Slievenamon), 2003, 2008
- South Tipperary Minor A Football Championship (8) 1984 (with Grangemockler as Slievenamon), 1986 (with Grangemockler as Slievenamon), 1987 (with Grangemockler as Slievenamon), 2001, 2003, 2004, 2007, 2008
- Tipperary Minor B Football Championship (1) 1994
- South Minor B Football Championship (3) 1990, 1994, 1998
- Tipperary Minor C Football Championship (1) 2003
- South Tipperary Minor C Football Championship (1) 2003

=== Hurling titles ===
- All-Ireland Junior Club Hurling Championship Runners-up 2008
- Munster Junior Club Hurling Championship Winners 2007
- Tipperary Junior A Hurling Championship Winners (2) 1998, 2007, 2024
- South Tipperary Junior A Hurling Championship (9) 1968, 1974, 1982, 1988, 1993, 1997, 1998, 2006, 2008, 2022, 2024
- South Tipperary Junior B Hurling Championship (3) 1993, 2008, 2010
- South Tipperary Junior Hurling League 1972, 1974, 1993, 1994, 2024
- South Tipperary Intermediate Hurling Championship (2) 2009, 2010
- South Tipperary Under-21 Hurling Championship (1) 2009
- Tipperary Under-21 B Hurling Championship (1) 2014
- South Tipperary Under-21 B Hurling Championship (2) 2007, 2014
- Tipperary Minor Hurling Championship (1) 2014
- South Tipperary Minor Hurling Championship (1) 2014, 2025

== Notable players ==
- Declan Browne has two All Star football awards and represented his country for the International Rules Series.
- Alan Campbell
- Peter Acheson
- Sean Keating
