= Clonmel Commercials =

Gaelic football club in County Tipperary, Ireland

- Tráchtálaithe Cluain Meala
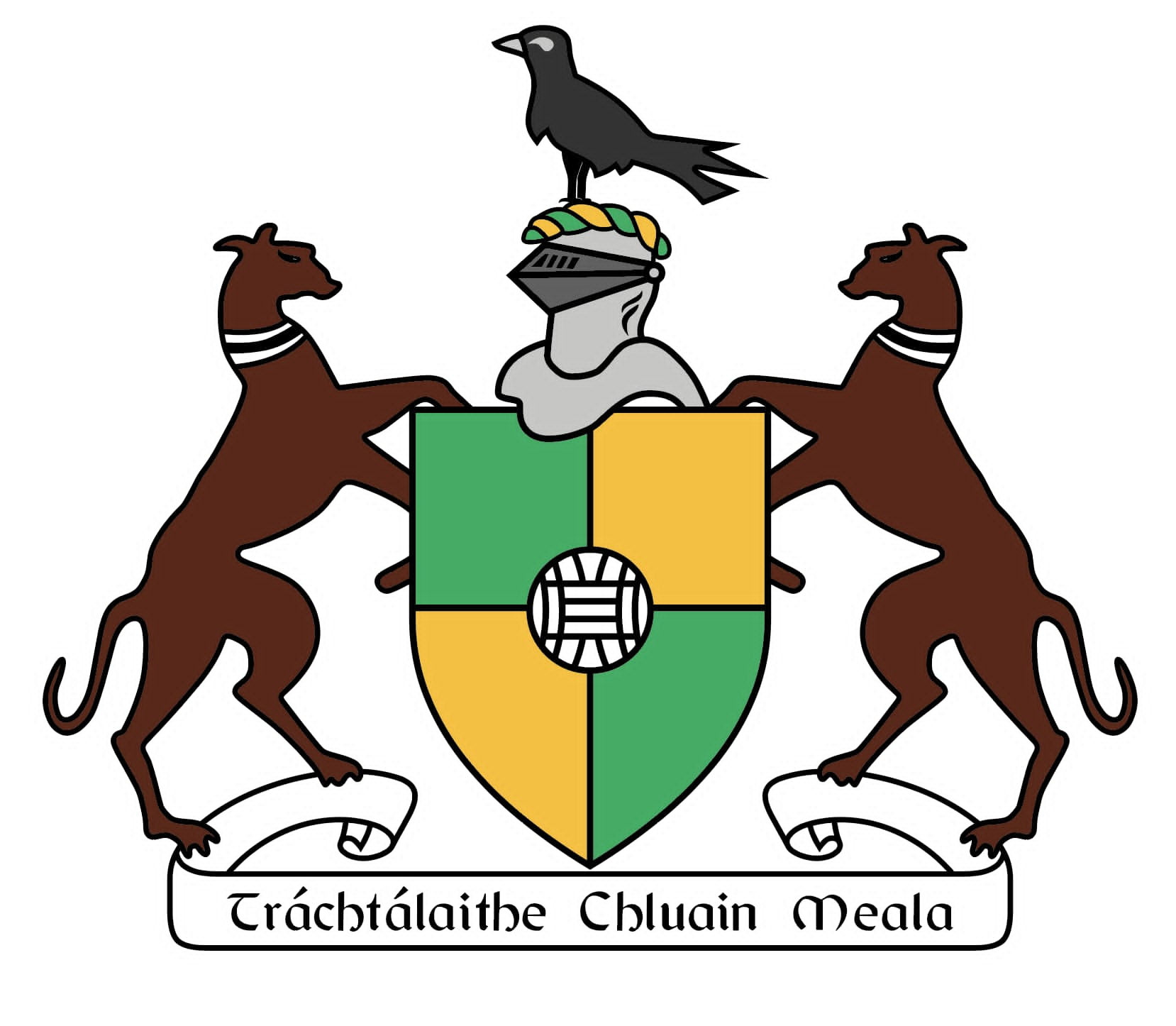
- Founded: 1934
- County: Tipperary
- Colours: Green and Gold
- Grounds: Clonmel Sportsfield; The Poppyfields Clonmel
- Coordinates: 52°21′12″N 7°42′47″W

Playing kits
- Home Kit Change Kit Third Kit

Senior Club Championships
	All-Ireland	Munster champions	Tipperary champions
Football	0	1	22

Clonmel Commercials Poppyfields Clubhouse

Clonmel Commercials GFC is a Gaelic Athletic Association Gaelic football club located in the town of Clonmel in County Tipperary, Ireland.

The club is part of the South Division of Tipperary GAA. They have been Tipperary Senior Football champions on twenty-two occasions, and Munster club champions once since their formation in 1934.

== Foundation and early success 1934-1964 ==
Clonmel Commercials affiliated with the Gaelic Athletic Association in 1934. The club won its first Tipperary Minor Football Championship in 1935 and retained the title in each of the following three years, completing four consecutive minor championships between 1935 and 1938. Commercials won the Tipperary Junior Football Championship in 1940 before securing their first Tipperary Senior Football Championship in 1944.

Further senior county titles followed in 1948 and 1956. The club also won minor championships in 1954, 1955 and 1960, establishing a successful underage structure during this period.

== County Dominance 1965-1971 ==
Commercials won three consecutive Tipperary Senior Football Championships in 1965, 1966 and 1967, with Brian O'Callaghan captaining the team on each occasion. The club won further senior titles in 1969 and 1971, giving it five county championships in seven seasons.

The club's success during this period also extended to underage football, with county minor titles won in 1965, 1967 and 1968. In 1969, Commercials won the Tipperary Under-21 Football Championship for the first time and regained the title in 1971.

The club's two county titles of the nineties came in 1990 and 1994. On both these occasions Commercials were beaten in the Munster Senior Club Final. 1994 was the club's fourth appearance in the provincial final where they were beaten by Castlehaven. In 1990 they came closest to winning the title only to lose out after a replay and extra time to Dr. Crokes.

== Revival, 2002-2014 ==
In 2002, Commercials won their first County title of the new Millennium by defeating Aherlow in Semple Stadium. Commercials won the Tipperary Senior Football Championship in 2002, defeating Aherlow in the final at Semple Stadium.

On 4 November 2012, Commercials won their 15th county senior title and their first since 2002, defeating defending champions Thomas MacDonagh's by 1–9 to 0–5 at Semple Stadium. Colman Kennedy scored the only goal of the game and was named man of the match.

Commercials subsequently reached the Munster Senior Club Football Championship semi-final, where they were defeated by Dr Crokes of Kerry by 1–14 to 0–6 on 18 November 2012.

== Munster Breakthrough ==
On 15 November 2015, Commercials reached their first Munster Senior Club Championship final since 1994 after a 1–13 to 0–3 win against Milltown Malbay in the semi-final. On 29 November 2015, Commercials won their first Munster Senior Club title after defeating Nemo Rangers in the final in Mallow. Trailing by two points in the second minute of injury time, Michael Quinlivan scored with a low shot to the net to win the game by one point.

== Current era ==
Commercials won their 17th Tipperary Senior Football Championship in 2017, defeating Killenaule by 2–9 to 0–8 in the county final.

The club secured another county title in 2019 and subsequently reached the Munster Senior Club Football Championship final, where they were defeated by Nemo Rangers. Commercials retained the Tipperary championship in 2020, defeating Loughmore–Castleiney in the final.

Commercials regained the county title in 2022 and retained it in 2023, bringing their total to 21 championships.

In 2025, Commercials defeated Kilsheelan–Kilcash to win a record 22nd Tipperary Senior Football Championship, moving clear at the top of the competition’s roll of honour.

== 2026 Senior Football Championship Results ==
Results up to 18 October 2026
Date	Competition	Stage	Opponents	Commercials score	Opposition score	Result
14 June 2026	South Senior Football Championship	Semi-final	Moyle Rovers	1–14	1–10	Won
21 June 2026	South Senior Football Championship	Final	Grangemockler–Ballyneale	3–16	2–16	Won after extra time
2 August 2026	Tipperary Senior Football Championship	Group 1, round 1	Ardfinnan	3–20	1–13	Won
15 August 2026	Tipperary Senior Football Championship	Group 1, round 2	Ballina	1–20	0–11	Won
27 August 2026	Tipperary Senior Football Championship	Group 1, round 3	Aherlow	2–14	0–08	Won
3 October 2026	Tipperary Senior Football Championship	Semi-final	Moyle Rovers	0–14	0–08	Won
18 October 2026	Tipperary Senior Football Championship	Final	Loughmore - Castleiney	0-13	0-15	Lost

Sources: Tipperary GAA fixtures and results.

== Honours ==
=== Provincial ===
- Munster Senior Club Football Championship (1): 2015

=== County ===
- Tipperary Senior Football Championship (22): 1944, 1948, 1956, 1965, 1966, 1967, 1969, 1971, 1982, 1986, 1989, 1990, 1994, 2002, 2012, 2015, 2017, 2019, 2020, 2022, 2023, 2025
- Tipperary Under-21 Football Championship (12): 1969, 1971, 1977, 1983, 1984, 1998, 2010, 2014, 2015, 2016, 2023, 2024
- Tipperary Minor Football Championship (20): 1935, 1936, 1937, 1938, 1954, 1955, 1960, 1965, 1967, 1968, 1975, 1978, 1981, 1992, 1993, 2010, 2011, 2012, 2013, 2014
- Tipperary Junior Football Championship (2): 1940, 2007
- Tipperary Junior B Football Championship (1): 2011

=== Divisional ===
- South Tipperary Senior Football Championship (25): 1944, 1946, 1948, 1956, 1958, 1960, 1965, 1966, 1967, 1971, 1972, 1975, 1977, 1981, 1982, 1986, 1987, 1989, 1994, 2004, 2011, 2013, 2016, 2025, 2026

== Notable players ==
- Kevin Fahey 2020 Munster Senior Football Championship winner.
- Séamus Kennedy 2011 All-Ireland Minor Football Championship winner. Three All-Ireland Senior Hurling Championship winner. Fitzgibbon Cup winner.
- Jason Lonergan All-Ireland Minor Football Championship winner. Munster Under-21 Football Championship winning captain. 2020 Munster Senior Football Championship winner.
- Michael Quinlivan 2011 All-Ireland Minor Football Championship winner. 2020 Munster Senior Football Championship winner. Sigerson Cup winner. All Star Award winner 2016
- Ian Fahey All-Ireland Minor Football Championship winner.
- Peter McGarry, 2025 All-Ireland Senior Hurling Championship winner.
