= 2012 Tipperary county hurling team season =

Tipperary county hurling team
2012 season
Manager	Declan Ryan
All-Ireland SHC	Semi-Final
Munster SHC	Winners
National League	Semi-final
Top scorer	TBD
Highest SHC attendance	TBD
Lowest SHC attendance	TBD
Colours

The 2012 season was Declan Ryan's second year in charge of the Tipperary team, the second year of his initial two-year term since succeeding Liam Sheedy. In January the management appointed Paul Curran of Mullinahone as new captain and Pádraic Maher of Thurles Sarsfields as vice captain for 2012 season. On 6 February 2012, forward Lar Corbett announced his withdrawal from the Tipperary hurling panel for the 2012 season due to work commitments. On 13 May 2012, it was announced by Tipperary that Corbett had returned to the Tipperary Senior Hurling panel. On 24 June he made his comeback coming on as a substitute in the first half against Cork in the 2012 Munster Hurling Semi-Final as Tipperary won by 1–22 to 0–24.

In March, Tipperary won their first trophy of the year by capturing the Waterford Crystal Cup against Clare in Sixmilebridge by 1-21 to 2-12. The trophy was presented by Munster Council Vice Chairman Robert Frost to Brendan Cummins who captained the team in the absence of squad captain, the injured Paul Curran and vice-captain, Padraic Maher, who was unavailable following Fitzgibbon Cup games. On 13 May 2012, it was announced by Tipperary GAA that Lar Corbett had returned to the Tipperary Senior Hurling panel.

== 2012 senior hurling management team ==
Name	Position	Club
Declan Ryan	Manager	Clonoulty-Rossmore
Michael Gleeson	Selector	Thurles Sarsfields
Tommy Dunne	Selector (Coach)	Toomevara
Cian O'Neill	Trainer	Moorefield

=== 2012 Squad ===
Number	Player	Position	Local Club
1	Brendan Cummins	Goalkeeper	Ballybacon-Grange
2	Conor O'Brien	Right Corner Back	Éire Óg, Annacarty
3	Paul Curran (C)	Full back	Mullinahone
4	Mickey Cahill	Left Corner Back	Thurles Sarsfields
5	Thomas Stapleton	Right half back	Templederry
6	Conor O'Mahoney	Centre half back	Newport
7	Pádraic Maher	Left half back	Thurles Sarsfields
8	Brendan Maher	Midfield	Borris-Ileigh
9	Shane McGrath	Midfield	Ballinahinch
10	Pa Bourke	Right half forward	Thurles Sarsfields
11	Patrick 'Bonner' Maher	Centre half forward	Lorrha-Dorrha
12	Lar Corbett	Left half forward	Thurles Sarsfields
13	Brian O'Meara	Right Corner Forward	Kilruane MacDonagh's
14	John O'Brien	Full forward	Toomevara
15	Noel McGrath	Left Corner Forward	Loughmore-Castleiney
16	Darren Gleeson	Goalkeeper	Portroe
17	Shane Bourke	Left Corner Forward	J.K. Bracken's
18	Séamus Callanan	Right half forward	Drom-Inch
19	Eoin Kelly	Full forward	Mullinahone
20	Donagh Maher	Right Corner Back	Burgess
21	Shane Maher	Right half back	Burgess
22	John O'Keeffe	Left half back	Clonoulty-Rossmore
23	John O'Neill	Left Corner Forward	Clonoulty-Rossmore
24	Gearóid Ryan	Left half forward	Templederry
25	Paddy Stapleton	Right Corner Back	Borris-Ileigh
26	James Woodlock	Midfield	Drom-Inch
27	Timmy Hammersley	Right Corner Forward	Clonoulty-Rossmore
28	Johnny Ryan	Midfield	Drom-Inch
29	Seán Curran	Left half forward	Mullinahone
30	David Young	Left half back	Toomevara

== 2012 Waterford Crystal Cup ==
22 January 2012 Preliminary Round	Tipperary	2-24 - 1-16	Limerick Institute of Technology	Dolla
		Report		Referee: J. Sexton (Cork)

4 February 2012 Quarter-Final	Tipperary	2-11 - 0-12	University of Limerick	MacDonagh Park Nenagh
		Report

12 February 2012 Semi-Final	Tipperary	0-26 - 0-19	Cork	Templemore
		Report

4 March 2012 Final	Tipperary	1-21 - 2-12	Clare	O'Garney Park, Sixmilebridge
		Report		Attendance: 1,632; Referee: D Kirwan (Cork)

== 2012 National Hurling League ==
Tipperary finished in third place in the league table and qualified to meet Cork in the semi-final where they lost by 2-15 to 1-25 on 22 April.

=== Division 1A ===
NHL finalists Relegated team

Team	Pld	W	D	L	F	A	Diff	Pts
Kilkenny	5	4	0	1	13-95	8-69	41	8
Cork	5	3	1	1	9-88	6-90	7	7
Tipperary	5	2	2	1	2-87	8-65	4	6
Waterford	5	2	0	3	4-79	5-98	-22	4
Galway	5	2	0	3	4-81	8-86	-17	4
Dublin	5	0	1	4	10-70	7-92	-13	1

- Waterford are placed ahead of Galway as they won the head-to-head match between the teams.

==== Fixtures and results ====
26 February 2012 Round 1	Kilkenny	2-17 - 0-15	Tipperary	Nowlan Park, Kilkenny
14:30	R Power 1-11 (1-00 pen, 0-10f, 0-01 '65'), E Larkin 1-02, M Rice 0-02, M Ruth, TJ Reid 0-01 each.	Report	P Bourke 0-06 (0-05f, 0-01 '65'), N McGrath, S Bourke 0-03 each, C O'Mahony (0-01f), B Maher, E Kelly 0-01 each	Attendance: 10,664; Referee: M Wadding (Waterford)

11 March 2012 Round 2	Tipperary	2-20 - 2-18	Galway	Semple Stadium, Thurles
14:30	P Bourke 1-6 (0-5f), N McGrath 1-3 (0-1f), J Woodlock, B Maher, J O’Neill & S Bourke 0-2 each, C O’Mahony (65), B O’Meara, J Ryan 0-1 each.	Report	N Burke 0-7f, D Hayes 1-3, J Regan 1-2, C Cooney 0-3 (1f), B Burke 0-2, B Daly 0-1.	Referee: C McAllister (Cork)

18 March 2012 Round 3	Tipperary	0-31 - 2-15	Waterford	Semple Stadium, Thurles
14:30	N McGrath 0-7 (0-1f); P Bourke 0-7 (0-4f); B O’Meara 0-3; P Maher 0-2; B Maher 0-2; J Woodlock 0-2; J O’Neill 0-2; S Bourke 0-2; S McGrath 0-2; J Ryan, T Stapleton, 0-1 each.	Report	M Shanahan 1-4 (1-0p, 0-1f); M O’Neill 0-4 (4f); S Molumphy 1-0; S O’Sullivan 0-2; G O’Brien, S Walsh, J Nagle, K Moran, E McGrath, 0-1 each.	Referee: J McGrath (Westmeath)

24 March 2012 Round 4	Dublin	2-15 - 0-21	Tipperary	Croke Park, Dublin
	D Treacy, L Rushe both 1-2, A McCrabbe 0-3 (2f), R Dwyer, D Sutcliffe, N McMorrow all 0-2, J McCaffrey, D O’Callaghan both 0-1	Report	P Bourke 0-6 (5f), B O’Meara 0-5, N McGrath 0-4 (2f), J O’Brien 0-2, S Bourke, J Ryan, S McGrath, B Maher all 0-1	Referee: B Gavin (Offaly)

1 April 2012 Round 5	Tipperary	1-23 - 1-23	Cork	Semple Stadium, Thurles
14:30	P Bourke (1-6, 1-2f), N McGrath (0-5), J O’Brien (0-3), S Bourke (0-3), G Ryan (0-2), J Woodlock (0-1), P Maher (0-1), T Stapleton (0-1), E Kelly (0-1).	Report	P Horgan (0-9, 3f), C Lehane (1-2), C Naughton (0-4), D Sweetnam (0-3), J Coughlan (0-2), W Egan (0-1f), P Cronin (0-1), J Gardiner (0-1).

22 April 2012 Semi-final	Cork	1-25 - 2-15	Tipperary	Semple Stadium, Thurles
16:00	L O’Farrell 1-02, P Horgan 0-09 (6f), N McCarthy, W Egan (2f) 0-03 each, P Cronin, C Lehane 0-02 each, J Gardiner, P O’Sullivan, D Sweetnam, A Nash 0-01 each.	Report	B O’Meara 1-02, E Kelly 1-01 (1-01f), P Bourke 0-07 (5f), J Woodlock, G Ryan, N McGrath, S Bourke, J O’Brien 0-01 each.	Attendance: 15,424; Referee: M Wadding (Waterford)

== 2012 Munster Senior Hurling Championship ==
In July, Tipperary retained their Munster title with a 2-17 to 0-16 win against Waterford in the Final.

27 May
Quarter-final

Tipperary	2–20 – 1–19	Limerick
P Bourke 1–8 (0-5f, 0–1 65), B O’Meara 1–2, N McGrath 0–3, E Kelly 0-1f, T Stapleton 0–1, J O’Brien 0–1, S Bourke 0–1, S Callinan 0–1, S McGrath 0–1, C O’Brien 0–1.	Report	S Dowling 0–8 (4f), G Mulcahy 1–2, S Tobin 0–3, K Downes 0–2, C Allis 0–2, D Breen 0–1, D Hannon 0–1.

Semple Stadium, Thurles
Attendance: 22,068
Referee: B Kelly (Westmeath)

24 June
Semi-final

Cork	0–24 – 1–22	Tipperary
P Horgan 0–11 (8f); P O’Sullivan 0–3; J Coughlan 0–3; C Lehane 0–2; P Cronin, C Naughton, D Kearney, C McCarthy, D Sweetnam, 0–1 each.	Report	P Bourke 0–12 (7f, 2 65s); N McGrath 1–4; B O’Meara 0–2; B Maher 0–2; Padraic Maher, G Ryan, 0–1 each.

Páirc Uí Chaoimh, Cork
Attendance: 32,568
Referee: B Gavin (Offaly)

15 July
Final

Waterford	0–16 – 2–17	Tipperary
M Shanahan 0-08 (0-05f, 0-01 ‘65’), J Mullane 0-03, S Walsh 0-02, P Mahony, S Molumphy, E Kelly (0-01f) 0-01 each.	Report	J O’Brien 1-03, S Bourke 1-01, N McGrath, E Kelly (0-02f) 0-03 each, B O’Meara, P Bourke (0-02f) 0-02 each, Padraic Maher, S McGrath, M Cahill 0-01 each.

Páirc Uí Chaoimh, Cork
Attendance: 26,438
Referee: C McAllister (Cork)

== 2012 All-Ireland Senior Hurling Championship ==
19 August 2012
Semi-final

Tipperary	1–15 – 4–24	Kilkenny
P Bourke 1–8 (4f, 4 65s); N McGrath 0–2; J O’Neill 0–2; C O’Mahony, S McGrath, J O’Brien, 0–1 each.	Report	H Shefflin 0–11 (9f, 1 65); TJ Reid 2–2; A Fogarty 1–3; E Larkin 1–0; R Power 0–3 (1f, 1 65); B Hogan, M Fennelly, M Rice, C Fennelly, C Buckley, 0–1 each.

Croke Park, Dublin
Referee: C McAllister (Cork)

Tipperary had their heaviest defeat in the All-Ireland Senior Hurling Championship since 1897, with Kilkenny blowing them away by scoring 4-24, 3-15 in the second half to leave Tipperary with an eighteen-point defeat in front of a crowd of 50,220. In that semi-final match Lar Corbett was assigned the role of man marking Kilkenny defender Tommy Walsh around the pitch, with Kilkenny assigning Jackie Tyrrell to mark Corbett. The marking battle between the players developed into a sideshow and nullified Corbetts own game as he remained scoreless during the game. The tactic was heavily criticized by various analysts and reporters after the game. In early September, Declan Ryan and his management team of Tommy Dunne and Michael Gleeson informed the county board that they would not seek an extension to their two-year term in charge of the Senior hurling team and would be stepping down.

On 25 September, Eamon O'Shea succeeded Declan Ryan as manager of the Tipperary senior team.

== Awards ==
Tipperary had six players, Michael Cahill, Pádraic Maher, Pa Bourke, Bonnar Maher, Noel McGrath, and Brian O'Meara nominated for an All Star award but won no awards in 2012.
