= 2022 Tipperary Senior Hurling Championship =

Annual hurling competition season

- Dates: 22 July 2022 - 30 October 2022
- Teams: 16
- Sponsor: FBD Insurance
- Champions: Kilruane MacDonaghs (6th title); Jerome Cahill (captain); Liam O'Kelly (manager)
- Runners-up: Kiladangan; Alan Flynn (captain); Brian Lawlor (manager)
- Relegated: Éire Óg Annacarty

Tournament statistics
- Matches played: 34
- Goals scored: 80 (2.35 per match)
- Points scored: 1221 (35.91 per match)
- Top scorer(s): Willie Cleary (1-56)

The 2022 Tipperary Senior Hurling Championship was the 131st staging of the Tipperary Senior Hurling Championship since its establishment by the Tipperary County Board in 1887.

The defending champions were Loughmore–Castleiney, who were defeated by Drom & Inch at the quarter-final stage.

The competition was overshadowed by the death of Clonoulty–Rossmore hurler Dillon Quirke, who collapsed after 28 minutes of play in a game against Kilruane at Semple Stadium on Friday evening, 5 August 2022. The game was abandoned and other matches were immediately called off.

On 30 October, Kilruane MacDonaghs defeated Kiladangan 2–20 to 1–16 in the final after a replay to win their first title since 1985.

== Team changes ==
=== To Championship ===
Promoted from the Séamus Ó Riain Cup

- Templederry Kenyons

=== From Championship ===
Relegated to the Tipperary Premier Intermediate Hurling Championship

- Roscrea

== Format change ==
The Séamus Ó Riain Cup was renamed as the Tipperary Premier Intermediate Hurling Championship. This reduced the number of senior hurling clubs in Tipperary from 32 to 16. This meant that unlike in previous years, teams part of the Séamus Ó Riain Cup could no longer compete in their divisional senior championships, where if they were to win, they would enter the knockout stages in a preliminary quarter-final. Only the 16 teams in the group stages of the Tipperary Senior Hurling Championship were able to win the title.

== Divisional championship finals ==
Division	Winner	Score	Runner-up	Score	Ref
Mid	JK Brackens	0-19	Drom & Inch	1-15	
North	Nenagh Éire Óg	2-20	Kiladangan	2-18	
South	Carrick Swans	1-21	Mullinahone	1-17	
West	Clonoulty–Rossmore	1-20	Éire Óg Annacarty	0-19	

== Group stage ==
Advance to quarter-finals Advance to preliminary-quarter-finals Advance to relegation semi-final

=== Group 1 ===
Team	Matches				Score			Pts
Team	Pld	W	D	L	For	Against	Diff	Pts
Kilruane MacDonaghs	3	2	0	1	8-54	4-49	+17	4
Nenagh Éire Óg	3	1	1	1	7-44	3-52	+4	3
Clonoulty–Rossmore	3	1	1	1	1-64	7-44	+2	3
Moycarkey–Borris	3	1	0	2	3-45	5-62	-23	2

==== Results ====
23 July 2022 Round 1	Kilruane MacDonaghs	4-22 - 0-10	Moycarkey–Borris	Templederry
18.30	C Darcy (3-4), S McAdams (0-5), W Cleary (0-5, 4f), N O'Meara (1-0), J Cahill (0-2), A Morgan (0-1), T Cleary (0-1), K O'Kelly (0-1), S Hennessy (0-1)	Report	K Morris (0-5f), N Heffernan (0-2), K O'Regan (0-1), D Flood (0-1), J Bergin (0-1)	Referee: C Doyle

24 July 2022 Round 1	Clonoulty–Rossmore	0-19 - 3-10	Nenagh Éire Óg	Semple Stadium
13.00	Jack Ryan (0-8, 7f), C Hammersley (0-5), D Quirke (0-2), D Slattery (0-2), E Heffernan (0-1), J Maher (0-1)	Report	M Heffernan (0-7, 5f), J Morris (1-2), B West (1-0), C Crowley (1-0), C Ryan (0-1)	Referee: J Dooley

5 August 2022 Round 2	Nenagh Éire Óg	1-15 - 2-16	Moycarkey–Borris	The Ragg
19.00	M Heffernan (0-7, 4f), J Morris (1-3), T Heffernan (0-2), P Hickey (0-1), P Murphy (0-1), J Mackey (0-1)	Report	T Hayes (1-4), K Morris (1-1, 1-1f), R Shelly (0-3, 2f), J Bergin (0-2), K Cummins (0-1), D Flood (0-1), K Shelly (0-1), N Heffernan (0-1), C McCullagh (0-1), JJ Darmody (0-1)	Referee: A Tierney

21 August 2022 Round 3	Clonoulty–Rossmore	0-25 - 1-19	Moycarkey–Borris	Boherlahan
12.30	Jack Ryan (0-10f), J Maher (0-4), C Hammersley (0-3), D Slattery (0-2), E Heffernan (0-2), A Ryan (0-1), J O'Keeffe (0-1), M Ryan (W) (0-1), C Bourke (0-1)	Report	K Morris (0-9, 6f, 1 65'), R Shelly (1-2f), T Hayes (0-2), K Shelly (0-2), K O'Regan (0-2), N Heffernan (0-1), J Bergin (0-1)	Referee: K Jordan

21 August 2022 Round 3	Kilruane MacDonaghs	1-17 - 3-19	Nenagh Éire Óg	The Ragg
12.30	W Cleary (0-11), T Cleary (1-0), K O'Kelly (0-2), A Morgan (0-1), C Austin (0-1), J Cahill (0-1), C Darcy (0-1)	Report	M Heffernan (0-10), J Morris (2-2), C Crowley (1-1), T Heffernan (0-4), S Phelan (0-1), B West (0-1)	Referee: J Lillis

4 September 2022 Round 2	Clonoulty–Rossmore	1-20 - 3-15	Kilruane MacDonaghs	Templetuohy
12.30	Jack Ryan (0-9), S Ferncombe (1-2), C Bourke (0-3), R Heffernan (0-2), A Ryan (0-2), E Heffernan (0-1), James Ryan (0-1)		W Cleary (1-7, 6f, 1 65'), C Darcy (1-0), S Hennessy (1-0), A Morgan (0-2), J Cahill (0-2), N O'Meara (0-1), M O'Neill (0-1), K O'Kelly (0-1), S McAdams (0-1)

=== Group 2 ===
Team	Matches				Score			Pts
Team	Pld	W	D	L	For	Against	Diff	Pts
Drom & Inch	3	3	0	0	6-66	2-59	+19	6
Thurles Sarsfields	3	2	0	1	4-65	6-48	+11	4
Borris–Ileigh	3	1	0	2	1-60	3-61	-7	2
Templederry Kenyons	3	0	0	3	4-55	4-78	-23	0

==== Results ====
22 July 2022 Round 1	Templederry Kenyons	2-19 - 2-30	Drom & Inch	Borrisoleigh
19.30	E Murray (0-7, 5f), S Ryan (1-3), M Hogan (1-0), G Ryan (0-3), B Stapleton (0-3), D Carey (0-1), A Ryan (0-1), O Murphy (0-1)	Report	S Callanan (1-9, 5f), J Moloney (1-1), J Campion (0-4), T Nolan (0-4), J Ryan (0-3), P Campion (0-2), F Purcell (0-2), R Long (0-2), M Connors (0-1), L Ryan (0-1), D Butler (0-1)	Referee: A Tierney

23 July 2022 Round 1	Borris–Ileigh	1-14 - 2-23	Thurles Sarsfields	Semple Stadium
19.00	D McCormack (1-2), E Ryan (0-5f), C Kenny (0-2, 1f), Kieran Maher (0-2), L Ryan (0-1), J Kelly (0-1), JD Devaney (0-1)	Report	A McCormack (0-9, 6f), D Maher (1-3), P Creedon (1-1), P Bourke (0-3), R Maher (0-2f), C Stakelum (0-2), D Stakelum (0-2), S Butler (0-1)	Referee: M Kennedy

21 August 2022 Round 2	Borris–Ileigh	0-29 - 0-23	Templederry Kenyons	MacDonagh Park
15.30	B Maher (0-16, 13f, 1 65'), C Kenny (0-4), JD Devaney (0-3), S Kenny (0-3), Kevin Maher (0-2), Kieran Maher (0-1), E Ryan (0-1)	Report	S Ryan (0-8, 5f), E Murray (0-5, 4f), B Stapleton (0-4), G Ryan (0-2), M Hogan (0-1), O Murphy (0-1), M Ryan (0-1), C Murray (0-1)	Referee: P Carroll

21 August 2022 Round 2	Drom & Inch	3-21 - 0-23	Thurles Sarsfields	Semple Stadium
16.15 (broadcast live on TG4)	S Callanan (0-8, 7f), J Moloney (2-0), J Campion (0-4), E Collins (1-0p), D Collins (0-2), T Nolan (0-2), F Purcell (0-1), S Nolan (0-1), L Campion (0-1), M Connors (0-1), T Cahill (0-1)	Report	A McCormack (0-11, 7f), S Butler (0-3), D Stakelum (0-2), D Maher (0-2), P Creedon (0-2), P Maher (0-1), C Stakelum (0-1), P Bourke (0-1)	Referee: F Horgan

4 September 2022 Round 3	Borris–Ileigh	0-17 - 1-15	Drom & Inch	Semple Stadium
14.00	B Maher (0-6, 4f), JD Devaney (0-3), E Ryan (0-3, 1f), Kevin Maher (0-2), R McCormack (0-1), T Ryan (0-1), C Kenny (0-1)		S Callanan (0-7, 2f), D Collins (1-1), J Ryan (0-4), E Collins (0-2, 1f), R Long (0-1)	Referee: M Kennedy

4 September 2022 Round 3	Templederry Kenyons	2-13 - 2-19	Thurles Sarsfields	Dolla
14.00	S Ryan (2-5, 3f), E Murray (0-4, 3f), B Stapleton (0-2, 1 65'), P O'Leary (0-1), G Ryan (0-1)		A McCormack (0-11, 6f), P Bourke (2-2, 1-0p), S Cahill (0-4), P Maher (0-1), B McCarthy (0-1)	Referee: C Doyle

=== Group 3 ===
Team	Matches				Score			Pts
Team	Pld	W	D	L	For	Against	Diff	Pts
Upperchurch–Drombane	3	3	0	0	3-62	0-51	+20	6
Toomevara	3	1	1	1	5-46	3-51	+1	3
Holycross–Ballycahill	3	1	0	2	1-67	4-57	+1	2
Mullinahone	3	0	1	2	2-45	4-61	-22	1

==== Results ====
23 July 2022 Round 1	Upperchurch–Drombane	2-23 - 0-21	Holycross–Ballycahill	Clonoulty
16.00	L Shanahan (1-4), P Greene (0-5, 3f), J Butler (1-1), G Ryan (0-3, 2f), A Ryan (0-3), D Grant (0-3), S Ryan (0-2), K Ryan (0-1), P Ryan (0-1)	Report	D Woods (0-11, 8f), L Dwan (0-3), J Woods (0-2), L O'Mara (0-2), C Barrett (0-1), E Craddock (0-1), A Stakelum (0-1)	Referee: S Everard

23 July 2022 Round 1	Mullinahone	2-15 - 3-12	Toomevara	Semple Stadium
17.30	J Shelly (0-7, 6f), E Kelly (1-1, 1-0p, 1f), M Kehoe (1-0), E O'Dwyer (0-3), M O'Shea (0-3), G Horan (0-1)	Report	J Delaney (2-0), K McCarthy (0-5, 1f), A Ryan (1-0), C O'Meara (0-3), J Ryan (0-2), L Ryan (0-1), D Young (0-1)	Referee: K Jordan

5 August 2022 Round 2	Mullinahone	0-14 - 0-23	Upperchurch–Drombane	Boherlahan
19.00	J Shelly (0-5, 4f), E Kelly (0-5, 1f, 1 65'), M O'Shea (0-2), C Shelly (0-1), M Dunne (0-1)	Report	G Ryan (0-6, 4f 1 65'), L Shanahan (0-5), P Greene (0-4, 2f), A Ryan (0-3), K Ryan (0-1), D Grant (0-1), P Ryan (0-1), C Ryan (0-1), P Shanahan (0-1)	Referee: C Doyle

20 August 2022 Round 2	Holycross–Ballycahill	0-20 - 2-18	Toomevara	Borrisoleigh
16.00	D Woods (0-10, 7f), J Woods (0-2), D Fogarty (0-2), E Bourke (0-1), MJ Doyle (0-1), B O'Mara (0-1), L O'Mara (0-1), S Ryan (0-1), E Craddock (0-1)	Report	J Delaney (0-5), M McCarthy (0-5f), C O'Meara (1-1), D Young (1-0), A Hall (0-2), D Delaney (0-2), A Ryan (0-1), K Ryan (0-1), K McCarthy (0-1)	Referee: P Ryan

3 September 2022 Round 3	Toomevara	0-16 - 1-16	Upperchurch–Drombane	Semple Stadium
15.45	K McCarthy (0-7, 5f), M McCarthy (0-7, 4f, 2sl), R Brislane (0-1f), D Delaney (0-1)	Report	P Greene (1-6, 4f), G Ryan (0-4f), A Ryan (0-2), D Grant (0-1), P Ryan (0-1), C Ryan (0-1), L Shanahan (0-1)	Referee: F Horgan

3 September 2022 Round 3	Holycross–Ballycahill	1-26 - 0-16	Mullinahone	Littleton
15.45	D Woods (0-12, 5f, 1 65'), D Fogarty (1-3), J Caesar (0-4), J Dwan (0-3), B O'Mara (0-1), P Russell (0-1), S Ryan (0-1), L O'Mara (0-1)	Report	E Kelly (0-6, 2 65', 1f), J Shelly (0-4, 3f), S Curran (0-3), M Kehoe (0-2), C Whelan (0-1)	Referee: J Leahy

=== Group 4 ===
Team	Matches				Score			Pts
Team	Pld	W	D	L	For	Against	Diff	Pts
Kiladangan	3	2	1	0	4-49	1-41	+17	5
Loughmore–Castleiney	3	1	2	0	2-55	2-51	+4	4
JK Brackens	3	0	2	1	3-46	4-48	-5	2
Éire Óg Annacarty	3	0	1	2	1-45	3-55	-16	1

==== Results ====
22 July 2022 Round 1	Kiladangan	0-18 - 0-18	Loughmore–Castleiney	Semple Stadium
19.30	B McLoughney (0-9, 4f), A Flynn (0-2, 1f), J Gallagher (0-2), W Connors (0-2), D Moran (0-1), D Sweeney (0-1), C Byrne (0-1)	Report	L McGrath (0-6, 4f), N McGrath (0-4, 1f), T Maher (0-2), Ciaran McGrath (0-2), C Hennessy (0-2), B McGrath (0-1), C McCormack (0-1)	Referee: F Horgan

23 July 2022 Round 1	Éire Óg Annacarty	0-19 - 1-16	JK Brackens	Clonoulty
14.30	A Griffin (0-6f), P Bradshaw (0-4), P O'Dwyer (0-2), D Crosse (0-2), B Fox (0-1), K Fox (0-1), D O'Dwyer (0-1), C Mooney (0-1)	Report	L Fairbrother (0-8, 7f), A Ormond (1-2), P Cadell (0-2), D O'Shea (0-2), S Bourke (0-1), S Doyle (0-1)	Referee: S Lonergan (M)

20 August 2022 Round 2	Kiladangan	1-18 - 0-9	Éire Óg Annacarty	Dolla
19.00	B McLoughney (1-3, 1f), S Hayes (0-3), J Gallagher (0-3), P Flynn (0-2), W Connors (0-2), T Gallagher (0-2), A Flynn (0-2, 2f), B Seymour (0-1)	Report	A Griffin (0-3, 2f), E Bradshaw (0-2), C O'Brien (0-1), P Bradshaw (0-1), D Mooney (0-1), K Fox (0-1)	Referee: J Leahy

21 August 2022 Round 2	JK Brackens	1-16 - 1-16	Loughmore–Castleiney	Semple Stadium
14.30 (broadcast live on TG4)	L Fairbrother (1-8, 7f), A Ormond (0-4), S Doyle (0-3), C Cadell (0-1)	Report	L McGrath (0-10, 8f), B McGrath (1-0), Conor McGrath (0-3), N McGrath (0-2), C McCormack (0-1)	Referee: J Dooley

4 September 2022 Round 3	JK Brackens	1-14 - 3-13	Kiladangan	Semple Stadium
15.45	L Fairbrother (0-5, 4f), A Ormond (1-1), S Bourke (0-3), D O'Shea (0-1), N Quinlan (0-1), S Doyle (0-1), J Maloney (0-1), J Kennedy (0-1f)	Report	J Gallagher (1-1), P Flynn (1-1), B McLoughney (0-4, 2f), J Loughnane (1-0), T Gallagher (0-3), S Hayes (0-2), B Seymour (0-1), W Connors (0-1)	Referee: A Tierney

4 September 2022 Round 3	Éire Óg Annacarty	1-17 - 1-21	Loughmore–Castleiney	Holycross
15.45	A Griffin (0-14, 13f), D Mooney (1-0p), T Fox (0-1), P Bradshaw (0-1), B Fox (0-1)	Report	L McGrath (0-7f), Ciaran McGrath (1-0), A McGrath (0-2), N McGrath (0-2), C McCormack (0-2), C Connolly (0-2), B McGrath (0-1), L Egan (0-1), J Meagher (0-1), T McGrath (0-1), Conor McGrath (0-1), C Hennessy (0-1)	Referee: P Carroll

== Relegation ==
=== Semi-finals ===
24 September 2022 Relegation Semi-Final	Moycarkey–Borris	1-20 - 0-17	Éire Óg Annacarty	Clonoulty
14.00	K Cummins (1-3), K Shelly (0-6, 5f), K Morris (0-5, 4f), R Shelly (0-3f), R Ryan (0-1), T Hayes (0-1), D Flood (0-1)	Report	A Griffin (0-9f), P Devlin (0-2), D Kelly (0-2), D O'Dwyer (0-2), T Fox (0-1), P O'Dwyer (0-1)	Referee: P Ivors

24 September 2022 Relegation Semi-Final	Templederry Kenyons	2-14 - 0-24	Mullinahone	Templemore
16.30				Referee: S Everard

=== Final ===
8 October 2022 Relegation Final	Éire Óg Annacarty	0-19 - 2-21	Templederry Kenyons	Holycross
15.00				Referee: M Kennedy

== Knockout stage ==
=== Bracket ===
Preliminary Quarter-Finals; 11 September 2022
JK Brackens	3-17
Nenagh Éire Óg	1-19
Clonoulty–Rossmore	1-18
Thurles Sarsfields	1-16

Quarter-Finals; 24 & 25 September 2022
Kilruane MacDonaghs	2-17
Toomevara	2-15
Upperchurch–Drombane	2-21
JK Brackens	1-21
Drom & Inch	0-21
Loughmore–Castleiney	0-18
Kiladangan	1-14
Clonoulty–Rossmore	0-12

Semi-Finals; 9 October 2022
Kilruane MacDonaghs	2-17
Upperchurch–Drombane	1-14
Drom & Inch	1-17
Kiladangan	1-21

Final; 23 & 30 October 2022
Kilruane MacDonaghs	2-18; 2-20 (R)
Kiladangan	1-21; 1-16 (R)

=== Preliminary Quarter-Finals ===
11 September 2022 Preliminary Quarter-Final	Clonoulty–Rossmore	1-18 - 1-16	Thurles Sarsfields	Holycross
13.30	C Bourke (0-7, 2f, 1 65'), S Ferncombe (1-2, 1-0p), Jack Ryan (0-5f), D Slattery (0-2), C Quirke (0-1), M Ryan (0-1)	Report	A McCormack (0-8, 6f), P Creedon (1-0), S Butler (0-2), C Stakelum (0-1), S Cahill (0-1), P Bourke (0-1), J Armstrong (0-1), D Corbett (0-1), B McCarthy (0-1)	Referee: P Carroll

11 September 2022 Preliminary Quarter-Final	JK Brackens	3-17 - 1-19	Nenagh Éire Óg	Semple Stadium
15.00	L Fairbrother (0-10, 9f, 1 65'), S Bourke (2-2), A Ormond (1-3), D McEnroe (0-1), S Doyle (0-1)	Report	M Heffernan (0-11, 9f), J Mackey (1-1), T Heffernan (0-3), J Morris (0-3), C Crowley (0-1)	Referee: F Horgan

=== Quarter-finals ===
24 September 2022 Quarter-Final	Drom & Inch	0-21 - 0-18	Loughmore–Castleiney	Semple Stadium
16.00 (broadcast live on RTÉ2)	S Callanan (0-6, 5f), D Collins (0-4), P Campion (0-3), J Ryan (0-2), T Nolan (0-2), J Moloney (0-1), R Long (0-1), F Purcell (0-1), M Connors (0-1)	Report	N McGrath (0-9, 8f), L McGrath (0-2, 1f), A McGrath (0-2), Conor McGrath (0-2), C McCormack (0-2), C Hennessy (0-1)	Referee: F Horgan

24 September 2022 Quarter-Final	Kilruane MacDonaghs	2-17 - 2-15	Toomevara	Semple Stadium
17.45	K O'Kelly (1-2), W Cleary (0-5f), B O'Meara (1-0), C Darcy (0-3), S Hennessy (0-2), N O'Meara (0-1f), M O'Neill (0-1), S McAdams (0-1), C Austin (0-1), J Cahill (0-1)	Report	J Delaney (1-2), M McCarthy (0-5f), D Young (1-0), K McCarthy (0-3, 2f), R Quirke (0-2), K Ryan (0-1), A Hall (0-1), A Ryan (0-1)	Referee: A Tierney

25 September 2022 Quarter-Final	Upperchurch–Drombane	2-21 - 1-21	JK Brackens	Semple Stadium
14.00	P Greene (1-13, 10f, 1 sl, 1 65'), C Ryan (1-0), G Ryan (0-2f), P Ryan (0-2, 1 sl), J Butler (0-2), P Shanahan (0-1), L Shanahan (0-1)	Report	L Fairbrother (0-12, 10f), A Ormond (1-1), J Moloney (0-2), D O'Shea (0-2), P Cadell (0-1), D McEnroe (0-1), C Scully (0-1), S Bourke (0-1)	Referee: K Jordan

25 September 2022 Quarter-Final	Kiladangan	1-14 - 0-12	Clonoulty–Rossmore	Semple Stadium
15.45	T Gallagher (1-3), B McLoughney (0-5, 4f), P Flynn (0-2), D Sweeney (0-1), A Flynn (0-1), S Hayes (0-1), B Seymour (0-1)	Report	J Ryan (0-5, 2f, 1 65'), C Bourke (0-4, 3f), A Ryan (0-1), M Ryan (0-1), C Quirke (0-1)	Referee: M Kennedy

=== Semi-finals ===
9 October 2022 Semi-Final	Kilruane MacDonaghs	2-17 - 1-14	Upperchurch–Drombane	Semple Stadium
14.00	J Cahill (1-4), W Cleary (0-7, 2f, 2 65'), C Darcy (1-1), M O'Neill (0-2), S Hennessy (0-1), K O'Kelly (0-1), T Cleary (0-1)	Report	P Greene (0-7, 6f), J Butler (1-1), C Ryan (0-2), G Ryan (0-2), L Shanahan (0-1), N Grant (0-1)	Referee: C Doyle

9 October 2022 Semi-Final	Drom & Inch	1-17 - 1-21	Kiladangan	Semple Stadium
15.45	S Callanan (1-9, 6f, 1 65'), T Nolan (0-4), D Collins (0-3), J Ryan (0-1)	Report	B McLoughney (0-9, 6f), D O'Meara (1-0), J Gallagher (0-3), S Hayes (0-3), P Flynn (0-2), A Flynn (0-2f), W Connors (0-1), B Seymour (0-1)	Referee: J Dooley

=== Final ===
23 October 2022 Final	Kilruane MacDonaghs	2-18 - 1-21	Kiladangan	Semple Stadium
16.30 (broadcast live on TG4)	W Cleary (0-10, 9f), J Cahill (2-0), C Darcy (0-2), N O'Meara (0-2), T Cleary (0-2), S McAdams (0-1), M O'Neill (0-1)	Report	B McLoughney (0-10, 8f), P Flynn (1-4), W Connors (0-2), D McGrath (0-2), A Flynn (0-1), T Gallagher (0-1), J Gallagher (0-1)	Referee: K Jordan

30 October 2022 Final replay	Kilruane MacDonaghs	2-20 - 1-16	Kiladangan	Semple Stadium
15.00	W Cleary (0-11, 10f), C Darcy (2-2), S McAdams (0-2, 1 sl), A Morgan (0-1), J Cleary (0-1), C Austin (0-1), M O'Neill (0-1), K O'Kelly (0-1)	Report	B McLoughney (0-8, 5f, 1 65'), T O'Meara (1-1), P Flynn (0-3), B Seymour (0-2f), T Gallagher (0-1), D O'Meara (0-1)	Referee: C Doyle

== Championship statistics ==
=== Top scorers ===
==== Overall ====
Rank	Player	Club	Tally	Total	Matches	Average
1	Willie Cleary	Kilruane MacDonaghs	1-56	59	7	8.43
2	Bryan McLoughney	Kiladangan	1-48	51	7	7.29
3	Lyndon Fairbrother	JK Brackens	1-43	46	5	9.2
4	Séamus Callanan	Drom & Inch	2-39	45	5	9
5	Paidi Greene	Upperchurch–Drombane	2-35	41	5	8.2
6	Aidan McCormack	Thurles Sarsfields	0-39	39	4	9.75
7	Jack Ryan	Clonoulty–Rossmore	0-37	37	5	7.4
8	Michael Heffernan	Nenagh Éire Óg	0-35	35	4	8.75
9	Cian Darcy	Kilruane MacDonaghs	7-13	34	7	4.86
10	Darragh Woods	Holycross–Ballycahill	0-33	33	3	11

==== In a single game ====
Rank	Player	Club	Tally	Total	Opposition
1	Brendan Maher	Borris–Ileigh	0-16	16	Templederry Kenyons
1	Paidi Greene	Upperchurch–Drombane	1-13	16	JK Brackens
3	Aidan Griffin	Templederry Kenyons	0-14	14	Loughmore-Castleiney
4	Cian Darcy	Kilruane MacDonaghs	3-4	13	Moycarkey–Borris
5	Séamus Callanan	Drom & Inch	1-9	12	Templederry Kenyons
5	Séamus Callanan	Drom & Inch	1-9	12	Kiladangan
5	Darragh Woods	Holycross–Ballycahill	0-12	12	Mullinahone
5	Lyndon Fairbrother	JK Brackens	0-12	12	Upperchurch–Drombane
9	Willie Cleary	Kilruane MacDonaghs	0-11	11	Nenagh Éire Óg
9	Willie Cleary	Kilruane MacDonaghs	0-11	11	Kiladangan
9	Lyndon Fairbrother	JK Brackens	1-8	11	Loughmore–Castleiney
9	Aidan McCormack	Thurles Sarsfields	0-11	11	Drom & Inch
9	Michael Heffernan	Nenagh Éire Óg	0-11	11	JK Brackens
9	Aidan McCormack	Thurles Sarsfields	0-11	11	Templederry Kenyons
9	Sean Ryan	Templederry Kenyons	2-5	11	Thurles Sarsfields
9	Darragh Woods	Holycross–Ballycahill	0-11	11	Upperchurch–Drombane
