= Dillon Quirke =

Irish hurler (1998–2022)

Personal information
- Native name: Diollún Ó Coirc (Irish)
- Born: 28 February 1998 Rossmore, County Tipperary, Ireland
- Died: 5 August 2022 (aged 24) Clonmel, County Tipperary, Ireland
- Occupation: Retail manager
- Height: 6 ft 2 in (188 cm)

Sport
- Sport: Hurling
- Position: Wing-back
Club
- Years: Club
- 2015-2022: Clonoulty–Rossmore
Club titles
- Tipperary titles: 1
- All-Ireland Titles: 0
Inter-county*
Years	County	Apps (scores)
2018–2022	Tipperary	6 (0–01)
Inter-county titles
- Munster titles: 0
- All-Irelands: 0
- NHL: 0
- All Stars: 0
- *Inter County team apps and scores correct as of 12:08, 6 August 2022.

Dillon Quirke (28 February 1998 – 5 August 2022) was an Irish hurler who played for Tipperary Senior Championship club Clonoulty–Rossmore and at inter-county level with the Tipperary senior hurling team.

== Early life ==
Born and raised in Rossmore, County Tipperary, Quirke's father, Dan Quirke, won an All-Ireland medal at under-21 level in All-Ireland Under-21 Hurling Championship. He first played as a schoolboy in various juvenile competitions at Rossmore National School before later lining out as a student at Thurles CBS. Quirke lined out in all grades and was a member of the Thurles CBS senior team that beat St. Francis' College to win the Harty Cup in 2015, before losing the subsequent All-Ireland final to St. Kieran's College.

== Club career ==
Quirke began his club career at juvenile and underage levels with Clonoulty–Rossmore. He won consecutive divisional championship titles with the club's minor team in 2014 and 2015, before winning a Tipperary U21AHC title after a defeat of Thurles Sarsfields in the final. Quirke scored two points from play when Clonoulty–Rossmore beat Nenagh Éire Óg in the 2018 Tipperary SHC final.

== Inter-county career ==
Quirke began a two-year association with the Tipperary minor hurling team in advance of the Munster final defeat of Limerick, and again for the All-Ireland final defeat by Galway. Again eligible for the minor grade in 2016, Quirke won a second successive Munster MHC medal from the substitutes' bench after a 17-point defeat of Limerick in the Munster final. He later won an All-Ireland medal on the field after coming on as a substitute in the 1–21 to 0–17 defeat of Limerick.

After a year away from the inter-county scene, Quirke was called up to the Tipperary under-21 hurling team for the 2018 Munster U21HC. After lining out at left wing-back in Tipperary's 2–23 to 1–13 defeat by Cork in the Munster final, he was in the same position when the result was reversed and Tipperary beat Cork in the subsequent All-Ireland final.

Quirke was one of 12 under-21 players called up to the senior team's pre-season training panel in November 2018, however, he was later released from the panel. He was later recalled to the senior panel and made his first appearance in a 2–14 to 0–18 defeat by Limerick in round 1 of the 2020 National League. Later that season, Quirke made his championship debut when he came on as a 73rd-minute substitute for Jason Forde in an All-Ireland qualifier defeat of Cork. By 2022 he was a regular member of the starting fifteen and started all four games in Tipperary's unsuccessful Munster Championship campaign.

== Death ==
On 5 August 2022, Quirke collapsed while playing a Tipperary SHC match for his club against Kilruane MacDonaghs at Semple Stadium. The match was abandoned after he was taken to Tipperary University Hospital, where he was pronounced dead. Tipperary GAA postponed the weekend's matches as a mark of respect. President of Ireland Michael D. Higgins and Taoiseach Micheál Martin paid tribute. A vigil was held at his home club on 6 August. Tributes were also paid on television ahead of the camogie finals on 7 August. His funeral was held on 9 August in Clonoulty.

== Career statistics ==
Team	Year	National League			Munster		All-Ireland		Total	
Team	Year	Division	Apps	Score	Apps	Score	Apps	Score	Apps	Score
Tipperary	2019	Division 1A	0	0-00	0	0-00	0	0-00	0	0-00
Tipperary	2020	Division 1A	4	0-06	0	0-00	1	0-00	5	0-06
Tipperary	2021	Division 1A	3	0-00	1	0-00	0	0-00	4	0-00
Tipperary	2022	Division 1B	3	0-00	4	0-01	—		7	0-01
Career total			10	0-06	5	0-01	1	0-00	16	0-07

== Honours ==
Thurles CBS

- Harty Cup: 2015

Clonoulty–Rossmore

- Tipperary Senior Hurling Championship: 2018
- West Tipperary Senior Hurling Championship: 2016, 2017,. 2018, 2019, 2020, 2021, 2022
- Tipperary Under-21A Hurling Championship: 2018
- West Tipperary Minor A Hurling Championship: 2014, 2015

Tipperary

- All-Ireland Under-21 Hurling Championship: 2018
- All-Ireland Minor Hurling Championship: 2016
- Munster Minor Hurling Championship: 2015, 2016
