= 2018 Tipperary Senior Hurling Championship =

Annual hurling competition season

- Dates: 14 April 2018 – 21 October 2018
- Teams: 16
- Sponsor: Tipperary Water
- Champions: Clonoulty-Rossmore (4th title); John O'Keeffe (captain); John Devane (manager)
- Runners-up: Nenagh Éire Óg

Tournament statistics
- Matches played: 27
- Goals scored: 76 (2.81 per match)
- Points scored: 1031 (38.19 per match)
- Top scorer(s): Michael Heffernan (0-49)

The 2018 Tipperary Senior Hurling Championship was the 127th staging of the Tipperary Senior Hurling Championship since its establishment by the Tipperary County Board in 1887. The draw for the 2018 group stage took place on 29 January 2018. The championship began on 14 April 2018 and ended on 21 October 2018.

Thurles Sarsfields were the defending champions, however, they were defeated by Nenagh Éire Óg at the semi-final stage.

On 21 October 2018, Clonoulty-Rossmore won the championship after a 0–23 to 2–13 defeat of Nenagh Éire Óg in the final at Semple Stadium. It was their third championship title overall and their first title since 1997.

== Results ==
=== Group 1 ===
==== Table ====
Team	Matches				Score			Pts
Team	Pld	W	D	L	For	Against	Diff	Pts
Nenagh Éire Óg	3	3	0	0	81	50	+31	6
Clonoulty-Rossmore	3	2	0	1	63	48	+15	4
Roscrea	3	1	0	2	52	74	-22	2
Mullinahone	3	0	0	3	48	72	-24	0

==== Group 1 results ====
15 April 2018 Round 1	Nenagh Éire Óg	2-24 - 0-11	Roscrea	Dolla
	M Heffernan 0-13, T Heffernan 1-5, J Mackey 1-2, J Morris 0-3, P Murphy 0-1.		C Sheedy 0-5, S Fletcher 0-3, G Ryan 0-3.	Referee: J O'Grady (Rosegreen)

15 April 2018 Round 1	Clonoulty-Rossmore	1-14 - 0-11	Mullinahone	Bansha
	D Quirke (1-3), T Hammersley (0-3, 0-2F), F O’Keeffe (0-2), C Bourke (0-2), C Hammersley (0-2, 0-1F, 0-1x 65), M Ryan (0-1), J O’Neill (0-1).		E Kelly (0-9, 0-5F, 0-2x65), S Curran (0-1), E Keane (0-1).	Referee: K Jordan (Thurles Gaels)

11 August 2018 Round 2	Roscrea	3-18 - 0-19	Mullinahone	Templetuohy
	S Fletcher 2-2, C Sheedy 0-6, E Fitzpatrick 0-5, F Hannon 1-0, D O'Connor 0-1, S Conlon 0-1, J Gilmartin 0-1, G Ryan 0-1, D Ryan 0-1.		E Kelly 0-10, G Horan 0-4, P Kelly 0-2, E Fennelly 0-1, AJ Cronin 0-1, M Dunne 0-1.	Referee: G Howard (Burgess)

12 August 2019 Round 2	Nenagh Éire Óg	1-20 - 1-18	Clonoulty-Rossmore	The Ragg
	M Heffernan 0-13, P Hickey 1-0, J Mackey 0-2, J Morris 0-2, A Coffey 0-2, T Heffernan 0-1.		C Bourke 1-4, J Hammersley 0-4, M Ryan 0-3, T Hammersley 0-3, P White 0-2, F O'Keeffe 0-1, E Heffernan 0-1.	Referee: J Butler (Upperchurch-Drombane)

1 September 2018 Round 3	Nenagh Éire Óg	2-22 - 1-15	Mullinahone	Templemore
	A Healy 2-2, M Heffernan 0-8, J Morris 0-7, J Mackey 0-2, T Heffernan 0-1, J Moloney 0-1, K Gleeson 0-1.		E Keane 1-2, E Kelly 0-4, M Dunne 0-3, C Shelly 0-2, J Shelly 0-1, L Mullally 0-1, G Horan 0-1, AJ Cronin 0-1.	Referee: J McCormack (Knockavilla)

2 September 2018 Round 3	Clonoulty-Rossmore	1-22 - 2-08	Roscrea	Dolla
	C Bourke 1-4, T Hammersley 0-7, D Quirke 0-4, C Hammersley 0-3, T Butler 0-2, E Heffernan 0-1, M Ryan 0-1.		C Sheedy 0-8, J Gilmartin 1-0, J Ryan 1-0.	Referee: K Jordan (Thurles Gaels)

=== Group 2 ===
==== Table ====
Team	Matches				Score			Pts
Team	Pld	W	D	L	For	Against	Diff	Pts
Toomevara	3	3	0	0	59	45	+14	6
Kilruane MacDonaghs	3	1	0	2	57	58	-1	2
Éire Óg Annacarty	3	1	0	2	50	56	-6	2
Killenaule	3	1	0	2	61	68	-7	2

==== Group 2 results ====
15 April 2018 Round 1	Toomevara	1-09 - 0-10	Kilruane MacDonaghs	Dolla
	J Delaney 1-1, C McLoughney 0-2, C Canning 0-2, M McCarthy 0-2, P Ryan 0-1, J Young 0-1.		K Cahill 0-3, T Cleary 0-2, J Cahill 0-1, S Hennessy 0-1, C Morgan 0-1, C Darcy 0-1.	Referee: P Carroll (Burgess)

15 April 2018 Round 1	Éire Óg Annacarty	0-16 - 1-11	Killenaule	Dundrum
	S Ryan (0-5), C O’Brien and D Mooney(0-3 each), B Fox, D Crosse(0-2 each) D O’Dwyer(0-1).		John O’Dwyer(1-0), Joe O’Dwyer (0-3), M Doyle, K Bergin, P Kerwick (0-2 each), T Doyle, T Stakelum (0-1 each).	Referee: J Ryan (Boherlahan-Dualla)

11 August 2018 Round 2	Killenaule	2-24 - 3-16	Kilruane MacDonaghs	Templetuohy
	K Bergin 1-7, John O'Dwyer 0-10, P Feehan 1-1, E Barry 0-3, M Doyle 0-1, D O'Connor 0-1, P Kerwick 0-1.		C Darcy 0-9, N O'Meara 1-1, T Cleary 1-1, Justin Cahill 1-0, Jerome Cahill 0-2, K Cahill 0-1, E Williams 0-1, J Cleary 0-1.	Referee: K Jordan (Thurles Gaels)

12 August 2018 Round 2	Toomevara	2-14 - 0-18	Éire Óg Annacarty	The Ragg
	M McCarthy 1-9, K McCarthy 1-0, P Ryan 0-2, J McCarthy 0-1, J McLoughney 0-1, J Ryan 0-1.		A Griffin 0-7, P O'Dwyer 0-2, B Fox 0-2, D Mooney 0-2, K Fox 0-1, P Downey 0-1, R O'Brien 0-1, D O'Dwyer 0-1, T Fox 0-1.	Referee: J Ryan (Boherlahan-Dualla)

1 September 2018 Round 3	Kilruane MacDonaghs	1-19 - 0-16	Éire Óg Annacarty	Dolla
	C Darcy 1-9, K Cahill 0-3, Jerome Cahill 0-2, Justin Cahill 0-2, B O'Meara 0-1, C Cleary 0-1.		A Griffin 0-9, D Mooney 0-3, B Fox 0-2, T Fox 0-1, D Crosse 0-1.	Referee: S Everard (Moyne-Templetuohy)

1 September 2018 Round 3	Toomevara	4-15 - 1-14	Killenaule	Templemore
	M McCarthy 2-3, J Delaney 2-2, J McLoughney 0-4, C O'Meara 0-2, C Canning 0-1, J Ryan 0-1, D Delaney 0-1, J McCarthy 0-1.		P Kerwick 1-1, John O'Dwyer 0-4, M Doyle 0-2, K Bergin 0-2, E Barry 0-2, D O'Connor 0-1, T Doyle 0-1, T Stakelum 0-1.	Referee: P Kiley (Ballinahinch)

=== Group 3 ===
==== Table ====
Team	Matches				Score			Pts
Team	Pld	W	D	L	For	Against	Diff	Pts
Drom-Inch	3	2	0	1	74	57	+17	4
Thurles Sarsfields	3	2	0	1	48	46	+2	4
Upperchurch-Drombane	3	2	0	1	64	63	+1	4
Carrick Swans	3	0	0	3	36	56	-20	0

==== Group 3 results ====
14 April 2018 Round 1	Upperchurch-Dombane	0-20 - 1-13	Drom-Inch	Templetuohy
	P Shorrt 0-9,

14 April 2018 Round 1	Thurles Sarsfields	w/o - scr.	Carrick Swans

11 August 2018 Round 2	Thurles Sarsfields	1-24 - 1-15	Upperchurch-Drombane	The Ragg
	P Bourke(0-8), A McCormack(0-6), S Cahill(0-5), C Stakelum(1-1), S Lillis(0-2), P Maher, R Dwan (0-1 each).		J Butler(1-2), P Shortt (0-4), C Stapleton(0-3), P Shanahan, M Lee, N Grant (0-2 each).	Referee: P Kelly (Ballinahinch)

11 August 2018 Round 2	Drom-Inch	2-24 -0-16	Carrick Swans	Cashel
	S Callanan (0-8, 0-5 frees), S Hassett (1-3), D Collins (0-6), D Butler (1-2), J Ryan (0-3), T Nolan (0-1), M Campion (0-1).		Danny O'Hanlon (0-6, 0-4 frees), Aaron Dunne (0-3), Kevin Lanigan (0-2), Colin Loughman (0-1), Eric O'Halloran (0-1), Gavin O'Halloran (0-1 free), Jamie Kennedy (0-1), Mikey Loughman (0-1).	Referee: T Ryan (Kiladangan)

25 August 2018 Round 3	Upperchurch-Drombane	1-23 - 2-14	Carrick Swans	Golden
	P Greene (0-6), M Lee (1-2), P Shortt (0-5, 0-3 frees, 0-1 ‘65), J Butler (0-4), D Grant (0-2), C Stapleton (0-2), G Grant (0-1), L Ryan (0-1).		D O’Hanlon (1-5, 1-3 frees), E O’Halloran (1-4), G O’Halloran (0-3, 0-1 sideline), K Lanigan (0-1), A Dunne (0-1).	Referee: J O'Grady (Rosegreen)

1 September 2018 Round 3	Drom-Inch	2-22 - 1-18	Thurles Sarsfields	Holycross
	J Ryan 0-6, S Hassett 1-2, D Butler 0-4, M Campion 1-0, S Callanan 0-3, D Collins 0-3, S Nolan 0-3.		P Bourke 0-10, C Stakelum 1-2, R Maher 0-2, M Cahill 0-1, R Purcell 0-1, A McCormack 0-1, S Cahill 0-1.	Referee: F Horgan (Knockavilla)

==== Group 3 play-offs ====
11 September 2018	Upperchurch-Drombane	0-13 - 0-13	Drom-Inch	Templetuohy
	P Shortt (0-6, 0-4 frees), J Butler (0-5), M Lee (0-2).		S Callanan (0-9, 0-6 frees), S Hassett (0-1), D Butler (0-1), J Ryan (0-1 free), D Collins (0-1).	Referee: G Howard (Burgess)

16 September 2018	Thurles Sarsfields	1-27 - 3-16	Upperchurch-Drombane	Holycross

19 September 2019	Thurles Sarsfields	1-16 - 0-18	Drom-Inch

=== Group 4 ===
==== Table ====
Team	Matches				Score			Pts
Team	Pld	W	D	L	For	Against	Diff	Pts
Kiladangan	3	2	1	0	64	59	+5	5
Loughmore-Castleiney	3	2	0	1	69	49	+20	4
Borris-Ileigh	3	1	1	1	57	64	-7	3
Portroe	3	0	0	3	50	68	-18	0

==== Group 4 results ====
14 April 2018 Round 1	Kiladangan	0-15 - 1-11	Loughmore-Castleiney	Fr. Kenyon Park, Templederry
	W Connors 0-8, T Gallagher 0-2, C Kelly 0-2, B Seymour 0-1, A Flynn 0-1, P Flynn 0-1.		L McGrath 1-7, N McGrath 0-3, J McGrath 0-1.	Referee: J McCormack (Knockavilla)

15 April 2018 Round 1	Borris-Ileigh	2-10 - 0-12	Portroe	MacDonagh Park, Nenagh
	B Maher 0-6, J Hogan 1-1, L Ryan 1-0, D McCormack 0-2, R McCormack 0-1.		J Sheedy 0-4, K O'Halloran 0-3, J Ryan 0-2, R Byrne 0-2, A Willis 0-1.	Referee: G Howard (Burgess)

11 August 2018 Round 2	Kiladangan	1-22 - 1-18	Portroe	Nenagh
	D O'Meara 1-2, B McLoughney 0-5, A Flynn 0-4, T Gallagher 0-3, A Loughnane 0-3, B Seymour 0-2, J Horan 0-1, P Flynn 0-1, C Kelly 0-1.		J Sheedy 1-7, K O'Halloran 0-3, R Byrne 0-3, R Mulrooney 0-3 J Ryan 0-1, M Gennery 0-1.	Referee: J Ryan (Boherlahan-Dualla)

15 August 2018 Round 2	Loughmore-Castleiney	2-22 - 0-17	Borris-Ileigh	The Ragg
	J McGrath (1-12, 0-7 frees), C McGrath (1-0), L McGrath (0-3), N McGrath (0-3), A McGrath (0-2), J Ryan (0-1), E Ryan (0-1).		C Kenny (0-14, 0-11 frees), S McCormack (0-1), D McCormack (0-1), D O’Connor (0-1).	Referee: F Horgan (Knockavilla)

1 September 2018 Round 3	Kiladangan	2-18 - 2-18	Borris-Ileigh	Nenagh
	D Egan 1-6, B McLoughney 1-1, B Hogan 0-2, A Flynn 0-2, C Kelly 0-2, T Gallagher 0-1, D McGrath 0-1, J Gallagher 0-1, J Quigley 0-1, P Flynn 0-1.		C Kenny 0-13, D McCormack 0-4, R McCormack 1-0, J Hogan 1-0, L Ryan 0-1.	Referee: J Ryan (Boherlahan-Dualla)

1 September 2018 Round 3	Loughmore-Castleiney	1-24 - 2-11	Portroe	Dolla
	J McGrath 0-10, N McGrath 0-5, C McGrath 1-1, L McGrath 0-3, A Ryan 0-2, E Ryan 0-1, L Treacy 0-1, C Connolly 0-1.		J Sheedy 2-2, K O'Halloran 0-3, A Willis 0-2, R Mulrooney 0-1, J Moloney 0-1, M Gennery 0-1.	Referee: P Ivors (Ballingarry)

=== Knock-out stage ===
==== Preliminary quarter-final ====
25 September 2018 Preliminary quarter-final	Killenaule	1-16 - 3-12	Loughmore-Castleiney	Bishop Quinlan Park, Borrisoleigh
	John O'Dwyer (0-7, 0-6 frees), K Bergin (1-1), E Barry (0-3), T Doyle (0-2), Joe O'Dwyer (0-1), E O'Connell (0-1), M Doyle (0-1).		J McGrath (2-4), N McGrath (0-5, 0-2 frees), J Nyland (1-0), J Meagher (0-1), B McGrath (0-1), C McGrath (0-1).	Referee: P Carroll (Burgess)

==== Quarter-finals ====
29 September 2018 Quarter-final	Toomevara	3-15 - 1-20	Drom-Inch	MacDonagh Park, Nenagh
	M McCarthy 1-6, J Delaney 2-1, C O'Meara 0-3, B Dunne 0-3, J McLoughney 0-1, K McCarthy 0-1.		S Callanan 0-9, D Collins 1-0, J Ryan 0-3, S Nolan 0-1, S Hassett 0-1, K Hassett 0-1, P Campion 0-1, J Woodlock 0-1, J Moloney 0-1, J Lupton 0-1, D Butler 0-1.	Referee: P Ivors (Ballingarry)

29 September 2018 Quarter-final	Thurles Sarsfields	2-14 - 1-16	Kilruane MacDonaghs	MacDonagh Park, Nenagh
	R Maher 2-1, A McCormack 0-5, J Maher 0-3, P Bourke 0-2, M Purcell 0-1, S Cahill 0-1, C Stakelum 0-1.	Report	C Darcy 0-8, B O'Meara 1-0, J Cahill 0-3, S Hennessy 0-3, C Cleary 0-2.	Referee: J McCormack (Knockavilla)

30 September 2018 Quarter-final	Kiladangan	1-15 - 1-19	Clonoulty-Rossmore	Dolla GAA Field, Dolla
		Report	T Hammersley 0-7, C Bourke 1-1, F O'Keeffe 0-4, C Hammersley 0-3, D Quirke 0-2, T Butler 0-1, M Heffernan 0-1.	Referee: K Jordan (Thurles Gaels)

30 September 2018 Quarter-final	Loughmore-Castleiney	0-18 - 2-17	Nenagh Éire Óg	Dolla GAA Field, Dolla
	J McGrath 0-6, B McGrath 0-2, N McGrath 0-2, L McGrath 0-2, L Treacy 0-2, J Meagher 0-1, A McGrath 0-1, C Connolly 0-1, T McGrath 0-1.	Report	J Morris 0-9, M Heffernan 0-5, P Hickey 1-0, T Heffernan 1-0, P Murphy 0-2, K Gleeson 0-1.	Referee: F Horgan (Knockavilla)

==== Semi-finals ====
7 October 2018 Semi-final	Clonoulty-Rossmore	0-19 - 1-10	Toomevara	Semple Stadium, Thurles
	T Hammersley 0-7, C Hammersley 0-3, T Butler 0-3, D Quirke 0-2, C Bourke 0-2, E Heffernan 0-1, P White 0-1.	Report	M McCarthy 0-7, D Young 1-1, J Delaney 0-2.	Referee: J Ryan (Boherlahan-Dualla)

7 October 2018 Semi-final	Thurles Sarsfields	2-15 - 2-18	Nenagh Éire Óg	Semple Stadium, Thurles
	A McCormack 0-6, R Maher 1-2, D Maher 1-0, P Bourke 0-3, R Purcell 0-2, S Lillis 0-1, S Cahill 0-1.	Report	M Heffernan 0-9, A Coffey 1-1, P Murphy 1-0, J Morris 0-3, P Morris 0-1, P Hickey 0-1, T Heffernan 0-1, C Ryan 0-1, J Mackey 0-1.	Referee: F Horgan (Knockavilla)

==== Final ====
21 October 2018 Final	Clonoulty-Rossmore	0-23 - 2-13	Nenagh Éire Óg	Semple Stadium, Thurles
	T Hammersley 0-12 (9f); C Bourke 0-3; D Quirke 0-2 (sideline-cuts); P White 0-2; J O’Keeffe, T Butler, F O’Keeffe, M Ryan 0-1 each.	Report	J Morris 0-6 (5f); P Hickey, P Murphy 1-1 each; K Gleeson, B Heffernan, T Heffernan, M Heffernan (sideline-cut), A Coffey 0-1 each.	Attendance: 7,406; Referee: K Jordan (Thurles Gaels)

== Championship statistics ==
=== Top scorers ===
Rank	Player	Club	Tally	Total	Matches	Average
1	Michael Heffernan	Nenagh Éire Óg	0-49	49	6	8.16
2	John McGrath	Loughmore-Castleiney	3-33	42	5	8.40
3	Mark McCarthy	Toomevara	4-27	39	5	7.80
3	Timmy Hammersley	Clonoulty-Rossmore	0-39	39	6	6.50
5	Séamus Callanan	Drom-Inch	0-26	36	5	7.20

=== Miscellaneous ===
- Clonoulty-Rossmore won the title for the first time since 1997. **
- Nenagh Éire Óg lose the final for the fifth time since their last win.
