= Glenough =

Glenough Gleann Achaidh
- Townland
- Location in Ireland
- Coordinates: 52°37′29″N 8°01′19″W
- Country: Ireland
- Province: Munster
- County: County Tipperary
- Elevation: 426 m (1,398 ft)
- Time zone: UTC+0 (WET)
  - Summer (DST): UTC-1 (IST (WEST))
- Irish Grid Reference: R969525

Glenough (Irish: Gleann Achaidh) is a townland near Rossmore, County Tipperary in Ireland. Glenough consists of many dwellings and farms spread throughout the countryside. Glenough is a hilly area, with its highest point being Ring Hill at 426 metres (1398 feet). Ring Hill forms part of the Slieve Felim mountain range. Due to its elevation, Glenough has been chosen as a site for the erection of wind farms over the past decade.

Glenough is a hill-walking area. There are a number of forests in Glenough, which consist mainly of coniferous trees and completely cover most of the hill tops. Some of these forests have been planted and maintained by the Irish state forestry agency – Coillte, while other forests have been planted by local farmers with the help of government grants. Deciduous trees are also present, especially in Aughnaclanny Valley. Wild fallow deer live in the forests of Glenough. The Aughnaclanny River flows through Glenough, and is most easily visible at the bridge beside Glenough's former National School. It still stocks trout, and up to recently, salmon were still returning to spawn in the gravel beds beside the school. Aughnaclanny Valley is a Special Area of Conservation due to the alluvial wet woodlands, yew woods, and floating river vegetation associated with the lower course of the River Suir and its tributaries. Aughnaclanny Valley is also a proposed National Heritage Area.

Glenough National School was permanently closed in the 1980s due to falling numbers, and since then children from Glenough have attended primary school at Rossmore National School. The original school was built in 1856, and served as a one teacher class, for most of its existence.

== Geography ==
Glenough townland is a sub-division of the following areas:

- Clonoulty and Rossmore Roman Catholic parish
- Clonoulty-Rossmore GAA club
- Clonoulty West - electoral division
- Clonoulty - old civil parish
- Tipperary County Council
- Tipperary (Dáil constituency)
