= Tony Brennan =

Irish hurler (1916–1965)

Personal information
- Native name: Tónaí Ó Braonáin (Irish)
- Born: 13 January 1916 Clonoulty, County Tipperary
- Died: 4 November 1965 (aged 49)
- Height: 6 ft 1 in (185 cm)

Sport
- Sport: Hurling
- Position: Full-back
Club
- Years: Club
- Clonoulty–Rossmore
Inter-county
- Years: County
- 1939-1953: Tipperary
Inter-county titles
- Munster titles: 4
- All-Irelands: 3
- NHL: 3

James Anthony Brennan (13 January 1916 – 4 November 1965) was an Irish sportsperson. He played hurling with his local club Clonoulty–Rossmore and with the Tipperary senior inter-county team from 1939 until 1953. Brennan is regarded as one of Tipperary's greatest-ever players.

== Biography ==
Tony Brennan was born in Clonoulty, County Tipperary in 1916 to a family steeped in sporting history. His uncles, on his father's side, were outstanding athletes in their day in their native place of Boyle, County Roscommon. A maternal uncle was Phil Byrne who won four All-Ireland hurling medals with Tipperary in 1895, 1896, 1898 and in 1899. Another uncle, Tom Byrne, won two All-Ireland football medals with Dublin in 1892 and 1894.

Brennan became interested in hurling at a young age, however, his career as a hurler almost ended when he fractured his skull at the age of twelve. After spending three weeks in hospital he recovered and was able to resume his playing career.

Brennan was educated at the local national school and later attended Thurles CBS where his hurling skills were further developed. In 1930 he was a member of the Dean Ryan Cup team and was full-back on the team that won the first ever Harty Cup for the school in 1933. Brennan's final year of secondary school took him to Rockwell College where he won numerous honours for being an outstanding athlete in 1935. That same year he played for the college's Harty Cup team, however, his side was beaten in the final by the North Monastery from Cork. At that time the All-Ireland colleges' championship was played on an inter-provincial basis and Brennan was selected for Munster on four occasions from 1931 to 1935.

In 1937 Brennan joined the Irish-speaking battalion of the Irish Army and was stationed at Renmore, County Galway for eight years. He remained in the army for all of his life.

Tony Brennan died accidentally on 4 November 1965. On that day he and his father-in-law embarked on a pheasant shoot. Brennan had borrowed a shotgun from a neighbour that had a defective catch. While changing the gun from one hand to another to put a pheasant he had just shot into his bag, the firearm accidentally discharged and fatally wounded him.

Brennan was posthumously honoured in 2000 when he was named in the full-back position on the Tipperary Hurling Team of the Century.

== Playing career ==
=== Club ===
Brennan began his club hurling career with his local Clonoulty–Rossmore club. After moving to Galway in the late 1930s he joined the local club there in Renmore. Brennan won a junior county title in the late 1930s and played senior hurling with the club until his return to Clonoulty in 1945. In 1951 the club reached their first county final in several decades, however, Brennan never realized his ambition of winning a county medal as Holycross–Ballycahil were victorious on that occasion.

=== Inter-county ===
Brennan first came to prominence on the inter-county scene with the Tipperary minor team in the early 1930s. He won a Munster title in this grade in 1931, however, his side were later defeated in the All-Ireland semi-final. Two years later in 1933 Brennan added a second Munster minor medal to his collection. The subsequent All-Ireland final saw Tipp defeat Galway by 4-6 to 2-3 giving Brennan an All-Ireland Minor Hurling Championship medal. He missed Tipp's Munster minor final victory in 1934, however, he returned in time to capture a second consecutive All-Ireland medal.

After moving to Renmore, Brennan lined out with the Galway junior hurling team. He won a Connacht junior title, however, All-Ireland success in this grade eluded him.

In 1945 Brennan was back in his native-county and was invited onto the Tipperary team. He played at centre-forward that year as Tipp defeated Limerick in a memorable provincial final. It was Brennan's first Munster senior title. The subsequent All-Ireland final pitted Tipperary against Kilkenny for the first time in eight years. Brennan was moved to full-forward for that game as a crowd of almost 70,000 went to Croke Park. Tipp took a 4-3 to 0-3 lead at half-time, however, ‘the Cats’ fought back. Nevertheless, Tipperary won the game by 5-6 to 3-6 giving Brennan his first senior All-Ireland medal.

It would be four years later in 1949 before Brennan tasted further success. He captured a National Hurling League medal at the start of the year before later winning a second Munster medal following another victory over Limerick. The subsequent All-Ireland final saw Tipp play Laois, the surprise winners of the Leinster final. The game turned into a rout as the Munster men completely overpowered the Leinster men. Brennan collected a second All-Ireland medal following a 3-11 to 0-3 victory.

In 1950 Brennan began the year by winning a second National League title with Tipp. Tipperary later took on Cork in the Munster final. The stakes were high as both sides realized that whoever won would be the favourites to take the All-Ireland title. The game itself has gone down in history as a nadir in the history of crowd-troubled matches. It is estimated that up to 50,000 people packed into FitzGerald Stadium to witness the game as gates were broken down, walls were scaled and the playing field was frequently invaded. Oranges, sods of earth and overcoats were thrown at Tipp goalkeeper Tony Reddin as he tried to do his duty. In the end Tipp won the game by 2-17 to 3-11. In the All-Ireland final Tipperary faced Kilkenny. The game failed to live up to expectations, however, Brennan added a third All-Ireland medal to his collection following a 1-9 to 1-8 victory.

1951 saw Cork and Tipp meet once again in the provincial final. The atmosphere was different from the previous encounter; however, Tipp still won the game giving Brennan a third Munster medal in-a-row, his fourth overall. Wexford won the Leinster final for the first time in several decades that year and provided the opposition in the All-Ireland final. Wexford's Nicky Rackard gave a superb display of hurling, however, the Tipp forwards ran riot and notched up 7-7 to Wexford's 3-9. with that Brennan had captured his fourth All-Ireland medal.

1952 began well for Brennan when he won his third National League medal. Later in the Munster semi-final Tipp secured their 15th consecutive championship win, a record which still stands today. It looked as if Doyle's side would cruise to almost certain further Munster and All-Ireland titles; however, Cork put a stop to this with a narrow victory in the Munster final.

In 1953 both Cork and Tipperary met for the fourth consecutive year in the Munster final. The latter team was now on a downward spiral and duly lost the game by 3-10 to 1-11. This was Brennan's final appearance for Tipperary as he retired from inter-county hurling shortly after the defeat.

=== Provincial ===
Brennan also lined out with Munster in the inter-provincial hurling competition. He captured his sole Railway Cup winners’ medal in 1951.
