= 1997 All-Ireland Junior Hurling Championship =

All Ireland Champions
- Winners: Monaghan (1st win)
- Captain: Ciarán Connolly
- Manager: Joe Hayes

All Ireland Runners-up
- Runners-up: Meath
- Manager: Noel Keating

Provincial Champions
- Munster: Not Played
- Leinster: Not Played
- Ulster: Monaghan
- Connacht: Not Played

The 1997 All-Ireland Junior Hurling Championship was the 76th staging of the All-Ireland Junior Championship since its establishment by the Gaelic Athletic Association in 1912.

The All-Ireland final was played on 7 September 1997 at Parnell Park in Dublin, between Monaghan and Meath, in what was their first ever meeting in the final. Monaghan won the match by 3-11 to 0-11 to claim their first ever championship title overall.

== Results ==
=== All-Ireland Junior Hurling Championship ===
==== All-Ireland semi-finals ====
3 August 1997 Semi-final	Meath	3-11 - 0-09	Carlow	Croke Park

9 August 1997 Semi-final	Monaghan	1-13 - 1-08	London	Duggan Park

==== All-Ireland final ====
7 September 1997 Final	Monaghan	3-11 - 0-11	Meath	Parnell Park
