= John Kennedy (hurler) =

Irish hurler

Personal information
- Native name: Seán Ó Cinnéide (Irish)
- Born: 7 November 1964 (age 61) Clonoulty, County Tipperary, Ireland
- Occupation: Sales manager
- Height: 6 ft 0 in (183 cm)

Sport
- Sport: Hurling
- Position: Left wing-back
Club
- Years: Club
- Clonoulty–Rossmore
Club titles
- Tipperary titles: 2
Inter-county*
Years	County	Apps (scores)
1986-1992	Tipperary	15 (0-01)
Inter-county titles
- Munster titles: 4
- All-Irelands: 2
- NHL: 1
- All Stars: 0
- *Inter County team apps and scores correct as of 00:26, 28 March 2018.

John Kennedy (born 7 November 1964) is an Irish retired hurler. His league and championship career with the Tipperary senior team lasted seven seasons from 1986 to 1992.

Kennedy first appeared for the Clonoulty–Rossmore club at juvenile and underage levels, before eventually joining the club's senior team with whom he won county championship medals in 1989 and 1997.

Kennedy made his debut on the inter-county scene when he was selected for the Tipperary minor team. He enjoyed one championship season with the minor team, culminating with the winning of an All-Ireland medal as captain. Kennedy subsequently joined the under-21 team and won an All-Ireland medal in this grade in 1985. He later joined the Tipperary senior team, making his debut during a challenge game in 1987. Over the course of the following few seasons he enjoyed much success, culminating with the winning of All-Ireland medals in 1989 and 1991. Kennedy also won four Munster medals and one National League medal. A knee injury ended his career after a brief comeback in 1992.

After being chosen on the Munster inter-provincial team for the first time in 1987, Kennedy was an automatic choice on the starting fifteen for the following two years. He ended his career without a Railway Cup medal.

In 2020, his three sons, Colman, Conal, and Jack were part of the Tipperary team that won the 2020 Munster Senior Football Final against Cork on 22 November, Tipperary's first in 85 years.

== Honours ==
Clonoulty–Rossmore

- Tipperary Senior Hurling Championship (2): 1989, 1997

Tipperary

- All-Ireland Senior Hurling Championship (2): 1989 (c), 1991
- Munster Senior Hurling Championship (4): 1987, 1988, 1989, 1991
- National Hurling League (1): 1987-88
- All-Ireland Under-21 Hurling Championship (1): 1985
- Munster Under-21 Hurling Championship (1): 1985
- All-Ireland Minor Hurling Championship (1): 1982 (c)
- Munster Minor Hurling Championship (1): 1982

Achievements
Preceded by Eddie Kennedy	All-Ireland Minor Hurling Final winning captain 1982	Succeeded by Anthony Cunningham
Sporting positions
Preceded by Bobby Ryan	Tipperary Senior Hurling Captain; 1990	Succeeded by Declan Carr
