= 1982 All-Ireland Minor Hurling Championship =

All-Ireland Minor Hurling Championship 1982
All Ireland Champions
- Winners: Tipperary (15th win)
- Captain: John Kennedy

All Ireland Runners-up
- Runners-up: Galway

Provincial Champions
- Munster: Tipperary
- Leinster: Kilkenny
- Ulster: Derry
- Connacht: Not Played

The 1982 All-Ireland Minor Hurling Championship was the 52nd staging of the All-Ireland Minor Hurling Championship since its establishment by the Gaelic Athletic Association in 1928.

Kilkenny entered the championship as the defending champions, however, they were beaten by Galway in the All-Ireland semi-final.

On 5 September 1982 Tipperary won the championship following a 2-7 to 0-4 defeat of Galway in the All-Ireland final. This was their 15th All-Ireland title and their first in two championship seasons.

== Results ==
=== Munster Minor Hurling Championship ===
First round

| 12 May 1982 First round | Tipperary | 2-05 - 0-10 | Cork | Fraher Field, Dungarvan |
| | J Kennedy 1-1, M Scully 0-4, L Stokes 1-0. | | C Clancy 0-6, M Kingston 0-2, C O'Neill 0-1, T Barry-Murphy 0-1. | Referee: J Moore (Waterford) |

| 15 May 1982 First round | Waterford | 6-11 - 1-03 | Kerry | Bruff |
| | J Beresford 3-2, P Queally 1-2, A Rockett 1-1, F Keogh 1-0, P Hennebry 0-3, S Ahearne 0-2, C Mac Craith 0-1. | | M Crolwey 1-1, P O'Donoghue 0-1, W Perryman 0-1. |

Semi-finals

| 19 May 1982 Semi-final | Tipperary | 3-09 - 2-07 | Clare | Gaelic Grounds, Limerick |
| | M Scully 2-4, J Cormack 1-1, J Stokes 0-1, J Kennedy 0-1, M Kelly 0-1, N Sheedy 0-1. | | V Donnellan 1-6, P Taaffe 1-0, V O'Loughlin 0-1. | Referee: W Horgan (Cork) |

| 7 July 1982 Semi-final | Limerick | 2-12 - 2-07 | Waterford | Semple Stadium, Thurles |
| | D O'Sullivan 1-2, M McSweeney 1-1, B Finn 0-4, J Murphy 0=2, J Hegarty 0-2, J McMahon 0-1. | | L O'Connor 1-2, K Ryan 1-0, B Roche 0-2, A Shearne 0-1, P Hennebry 0-1, J Beresford 0-1. |

Final

| 18 July 1982 Final | Tipperary | 1-10 - 1-07 | Limerick | Semple Stadium, Thurlesʙ |
| | L Stokes 1-1, M Scully 0-3, J Cormack 0-2, G Bradley 0-2, N Sheedy 0-1, M Cunningham 0-1. | | B Finn 0-7, J Hegarty 1-0. | Referee: W Horgan (Cork) |

=== All-Ireland Minor Hurling Championship ===
Semi-final

| 8 August 1982 Semi-final | Galway | 2-06 - 1-08 | Kilkenny | Croke Park, Dublin |

Final

| 5 September 1982 Final | Tipperary | 2-07 - 0-04 | Galway | Croke Park, Dublin |
