= Peter Maher =

Peter Maher may refer to:

- Peter Maher (runner) (born 1960), marathon runner
- Peter Maher (boxer) (1869–1940), bare-knuckle boxer
- Peter Maher (sportscaster) (1946–2026), Canadian radio announcer for the Calgary Flames of the National Hockey League
- Peter Maher (hurler) (1872–1947), Irish sportsperson
