= Phil Byrne =

Phil Byrne may refer to:

- Philip Byrne (born 1982), Irish footballer for Carrick Rangers
- Phil Byrne (hurler) (1874–?), Irish hurler for Tipperary

== See also ==
- Philly Byrne, musician with Gama Bomb
- Phil Byrnes, character in After the Thin Man
- Philip Burne-Jones
