= Aidan Butler =

Irish hurler

Personal information
- Native name: Aodán de Buitléir (Irish)
- Born: 7 August 1974 (age 52) Clonoulty, County Tipperary, Ireland
- Height: 6 ft 3 in (191 cm)

Sport
- Sport: Hurling
- Position: Centre-back
Club
- Years: Club
- Clonoulty–Rossmore GAA
Club titles
- Tipperary titles: 1
Inter-county
- Years: County
- 1996-2003: Tipperary GAA
Inter-county titles
- Munster titles: 1
- All-Irelands: 1
- NHL: 0
- All Stars: 0

Aidan Butler (born 7 August 1974) is an Irish hurler who played as a midfielder for the Tipperary senior team.

Butler made his senior championship debut as a substitute versus Kerry during the 1996 championship. and made his final appearance in the county senior colours during the 2003 championship. During that time he won a senior All-Ireland winners' medal as a non-playing substitute.

At club level Butler is a one-time county club championship medallist with Clonoulty–Rossmore GAA.
