= Enda Heffernan =

Irish hurler

Sport
- Sport: Hurling
- Position: Half-back
Club
- Years: Club
- Clonoulty-Rossmore
Club titles
- Tipperary titles: 0
Inter-county*
Years	County	Apps (scores)
2022 -	Tipperary	0 (0-00)
Inter-county titles
- Munster titles: 0
- All-Irelands: 0
- NHL: 0
- All Stars: 0
- *Inter County team apps and scores correct as of 18:12, 12 March 2019.

Enda Heffernan is an Irish hurler who plays for Tipperary Senior Championship club Clonoulty-Rossmore and at inter-county level with the Tipperary senior hurling team.

== Career ==
During the 2022 season, Heffernan made his senior debut for Tipperary. On 20 March 2022, he came on as a substitute in the fifth round of the 2022 National Hurling League against Antrim in a 7-29 to 1-17 win.
