= John O'Neill (Tipperary hurler) =

Irish hurler

Personal information
- Born: County Tipperary

Sport
- Sport: Hurling, Ice Maker in Yonkers
- Position: Forward
Club
- Years: Club
- Clonoulty–Rossmore
Inter-county
- Years: County
- 2011–2014 2015–: Tipperary; Kerry
Inter-county titles
- Munster titles: 1
- All-Irelands: 0
- NHL: 1 (Div. 2A)

John O'Neill (born 13 July 1990) is an Irish sportsman. He plays hurling with his local club Clonoulty–Rossmore and with the Kerry senior team.

== Career ==
In 2007, O'Neill was a member of the Tipperary minor team that won the Munster MHC final by 0–18 to 1–11 against Cork. Tipperary subsequently defeated Kilkenny to qualify for the All-Ireland MHC final. Cork, the defeated Munster MHC finalists, provided the opposition and a high-scoring game developed over the course of the hour. At the full-time whistle Tipperary were the champions by 3–14 to 2–11.

On 28 July 2010, O'Neill was a non-playing substitute as Tipperary defeated Clare in the 2010 Munster U21HC final at Semple Stadium, winning by 1–22 to 1–17. On 11 September 2010, he came on as a substitute as Tipperary clinched the All Ireland U21HC title by defeating Galway by 5–22 to 0–12 at Semple Stadium.

He made his senior Tipperary debut in the first round of the league on 12 February 2011 against Kilkenny, scoring a point in a 1–10 to 1–17 defeat at Semple Stadium. In his second game against Dublin at Croke Park a week later he scored a goal and two points.

== Honours ==
=== Tipperary ===
- All-Ireland Under-21 Hurling Championship:
  - Winner (1): 2010
- Munster Under-21 Hurling Championship:
  - Winner (1): 2010
- All-Ireland Minor Hurling Championship:
  - Winner (1): 2007
- Munster Minor Hurling Championship:
  - Winner (1): 2007
