= Anthony Carew =

Irish hurler (born 1889)

Personal information
- Native name: Antóin Carrún (Irish)
- Born: 1889 Thurles, County Tipperary, Ireland
- Died: Unknown
- Occupation: Commission agent

Sport
- Sport: Hurling
Clubs
- Years: Club
- Thurles Sarsfield's; Clonoulty–Rossmore
Club titles
- Tipperary titles: 3
Inter-county
- Years: County
- 1908-1912: Tipperary
Inter-county titles
- Munster titles: 2
- All-Irelands: 1

Anthony Carew (born 1889) was an Irish hurler who played for the Tipperary senior team.

Carew joined the team during the 1908 championship and was a regular member of the starting fifteen until his retirement after the 1912 championship. During that time he won one All-Ireland medal and two Munster medals.

At club level Gleeson enjoyed a lengthy career with Thurles Sarsfield's and Clonoulty–Rossmore.
