= Joe Hayes (hurler) =

Irish hurler and manager

Personal information
- Native name: Seosamh Ó hAodha (Irish)
- Born: 1963 (age 62–63) Clonoulty, County Tipperary, Ireland
- Occupation: Engineer
- Height: 5 ft 11 in (180 cm)

Sport
- Sport: Hurling
- Position: Midfield
Club
- Years: Club
- Clonoulty–Rossmore
Club titles
- Tipperary titles: 1
Inter-county*
Years	County	Apps (scores)
1986–1994	Tipperary	18 (1–11)
Inter-county titles
- Munster titles: 5
- All-Irelands: 2
- NHL: 2
- All Stars: 0
- *Inter County team apps and scores correct as of 18:25, 29 March 2018.

Joe Hayes (born 9 January 1963) is an Irish former hurling manager and former player. His league and championship career with the Tipperary senior team spanned eight seasons from 1986 to 1994.

Hayes first appeared for the Clonoulty–Rossmore club at juvenile and underage levels, before eventually joining the club's senior team. In 1989, he won a county championship medal.

Hayes made his debut on the inter-county scene at the age of sixteen when he was selected for the Tipperary minor team. He enjoyed two championship seasons with the minor team, winning an All-Ireland MHC medal in his debut season. Hayes later joined the Tipperary under-21 team and was a back-to-back All-Ireland U-21 HC runner-up. He made his senior debut during the 1986-87 league. Over the course of the following eight seasons Hayes had a number of successes, including winning All-Ireland SHC medals in 1989 and 1991. He also won five Munster SHC medals and two National League medals. Hayes later won an All-Ireland JHC medal in the junior grade as player–manager with Monaghan.

== Honours ==
=== Player ===
Clonoulty–Rossmore

- Tipperary Senior Hurling Championship (1): 1989

Tipperary

- All-Ireland Senior Hurling Championship (2): 1989, 1991
- Munster Senior Hurling Championship (5): 1987, 1988, 1989, 1991, 1993
- National Hurling League (1): 1987-88, 1993-94
- Munster Under-21 Hurling Championship (2): 1983, 1984
- All-Ireland Minor Hurling Championship (1): 1980
- Munster Minor Hurling Championship (1): 1980

=== Player–manager ===
Monaghan

- All-Ireland Junior Hurling Championship (1): 1997
- Ulster Junior Hurling Championship (2): 1997, 1998
