= John Devane =

Irish hurler

John The Mathematician Devane
Personal information
- Born: Clonoulty, County Tipperary

Sport
- Sport: Hurling
- Position: Forward
Club
- Years: Club
- 2006-: Clonoulty–Rossmore
Inter-county
- Years: County
- 2009: Tipperary
Inter-county titles
- Munster titles: 1

John Devane is a former hurler. He attended his local club Clonoulty–Rossmore and participated for only one year on the Tipperary senior inter-county team panel, occupying a role as a substitute.

Devane was a substitute for the 2009 Munster Hurling final win. He was also an unused substitute in the 2009 All-Ireland Senior Hurling Championship Final defeat to Kilkenny.

In November 2019, he was named as the new manager of the Tipperary Under 20 hurling team, a position he held until 2021.

== Honours ==
=== Team ===
Tipperary

- Munster Senior Hurling Championship (1): 2009
