= Phil Byrne (hurler) =

Irish hurler (1874–1946)

Personal information
- Native name: Pilib Ó Broin (Irish)
- Born: 10 April 1874 Clonoulty, County Tipperary, Ireland
- Died: 12 January 1946 (aged 71) Clonoulty, County Tipperary, Ireland
- Occupation: Farmer

Sport
- Sport: Hurling
Clubs
- Years: Club
- Clonoulty–Rossmore; Boherlahan–Dualla
Inter-county
- Years: County
- 1895–1904: Tipperary
Inter-county titles
- Munster titles: 4
- All-Irelands: 4

Phillip Byrne (10 April 1874 – 12 January 1946) was an Irish hurler who played for the Tipperary senior team.

Byrne made his first appearance for the team during the 1895 championship and was a regular member of the starting fifteen at various times until his retirement after the 1904 championship. During that time he won four All-Ireland medals and four Munster medals.

At club level Byrne played with both Clonoulty–Rossmore and Boherlahan–Dualla.
