= Timmy Hammersley =

Irish hurler

Personal information
- Born: 12 December 1987 (age 38) Clonmel, Ireland
- Occupation: Gaelic games development officer
- Height: 1.78 m (5 ft 10 in)

Sport
- Sport: Hurling
- Position: Full-forward
Club
- Years: Club
- 2004-present: Clonoulty–Rossmore
Club titles
- Tipperary titles: 1
Inter-county*
Years	County	Apps (scores)
2010-2012	Tipperary	1 (0-1)
Inter-county titles
- Munster titles: 0
- All-Irelands: 1
- NHL: 0
- All Stars: 0
- *Inter County team apps and scores correct as of 19:26, 5 April 2015.

Timmy Hammersley (born 12 December 1987) is an Irish sportsperson. He plays hurling with his local club Clonoulty–Rossmore and with the Tipperary senior inter-county team.

== Career ==
Hammersley was part of the Tipperary Under 21 Hurling panel in 2007 and 2008. He was the top scorer in the 2010 Fitzgibbon Cup helping Waterford Institute of Technology to finish as runners-up, he scored 1–11 in the final.

He made his National Hurling League debut as a substitute against Galway in March 2010, and started his first game on 21 March against Limerick where he scored 1–4 in a 2–24 to 0–8 win.

On 30 May 2010, Hammersley made his Championship debut coming on as a second-half substitute to score a point against Cork in the Munster Senior Hurling Championship quarter-final in Páirc Uí Chaoimh. Tipperary ended up losing the game by 3–15 to 0–14.

On 5 September 2010, Hammersley was a non-playing substitute as Tipperary won their 26th All Ireland title, beating reigning champions Kilkenny by 4–17 to 1–18 in the final, preventing Kilkenny from achieving an historic 5-in-a-row, it was Hammersley's first All-Ireland winners medal.

On 21 October 2018, Hammersley scored 12 points as a full-forward for Clonoulty-Rossmore against Nenagh Éire Óg, leading to the team's first Tipperary senior hurling title since 1997. In a pitch-side interview with Raidió Teilifís Éireann, Hammersley paid tribute to the GAA as "the lifeblood of the whole of Ireland" in remarks described by the national broadcaster as "eloquent".

== Activism ==
Hammersley has been an outspoken supporter of the Palestinian people. In 2015, he traveled to Bethlehem to volunteer with Palestinian youth. He wrote an article in an Irish journal speaking of his experience there, and severely condemning many of Israel's policies including the separation wall, the tourism and economic divide, Israeli settlements, refugee camps, and the system he accused of making Palestinians "second class citizen[s] in [their] own land." In 2016, Hammersley was one of two Irish sportspeople, along with Brian Kerr, to put his name to an open letter protesting Bank of Ireland's decision to shut down the accounts of the Ireland Palestine Solidarity Campaign.

He has also been a figure of significance within the Gaelic Voices for Change movement which has spoken out in opposition to homelessness in Ireland. In a wide-ranging interview with the Times of Ireland, Hammersley went on record with his belief that "you have a responsibility to speak out for people who are being oppressed."

In recent times, Hammersley has been professionally linked with the charity SpunOut.ie, a youth education and advocacy organization.
