= Rossmore, County Tipperary =

Rossmore An Ros Mór
- Village
- Location in Ireland
- Coordinates: 52°37′12″N 8°00′07″W
- Country: Ireland
- Province: Munster
- County: County Tipperary
- Elevation: 130 m (430 ft)
- Time zone: UTC+0 (WET)
  - Summer (DST): UTC-1 (IST (WEST))
- Irish Grid Reference: R994518

Rossmore (Irish: An Ros Mór, meaning 'the big wood') is a small village and townland in County Tipperary in Ireland. It is in the civil parish of Clonoulty and the historical barony of Kilnamanagh Lower. It is located in the electoral division (ED) of Clonoulty West. Rossmore is also half of the Catholic parish of Clonoulty and Rossmore in the Archdiocese of Cashel and Emly.

== Geography ==
Rossmore is administered by Tipperary County Council, and lies within the boundaries of Tipperary constituency for the purposes of Irish general elections.

It is almost equidistant from the three nearest towns. Cashel is 12 kilometres south-east, Thurles is approximately 13 kilometres north-east, and Tipperary Town is 14 kilometres south-west.

Rossmore may also refer to a slightly larger area which forms one half of the catchment of Clonoulty–Rossmore GAA club. The usage of the term Rossmore in these instances encompasses a number of other townlands including Rossmore itself, plus Glenough, Turraheen, Knockbawn, Toragh, Doorish, Westonslot, Gorteenamoe, Drum, Drumwood, Tooreen, Coolanga, Clunedarby, Brockagh, Park, and Stouke.

The Multeen River, a tributary of the River Suir, flows by Rossmore village and continues downstream under Rossmore Bridge.

== History ==
Evidence of ancient settlement in the area includes ringfort and ring barrow sites in the townlands of Coolanga Lower and Glenough Lower. Rossmore Bridge, in Rossmore townland, was built c. 1820.

Rossmore Mills represented the Irish woolen industry with 10 others at the Great Exhibition in London in 1851. The owner of the wool mills was John Daly and showcased frieze cloth for men's clothing and horse blankets internationally for the first time. It comprised a tuck and carding mill by the bridge downstream from the beginning of its 950-metre mill race at Rossmore bridge on the Multeen River. It was on the estate of Rossmore House and next to a cricket pitch. It's origins may stem from the 12th century Clonoulty Preceptory of the Knights Templar, which had stocks of white cloth, robes in coloured wool and valuable horses. Rossmore Mills also exhibited among 12 woollen manufacturers in 1864 at the first Exhibition of Manufactures at the Royal Dublin Society. The mills were improved by John Daly's son-in-law John Mulcahy of the Ardfinnan Woollen Mills but later became a creamery after 1891.

== Amenities and sport ==
The village has a national (primary) school, a post office, a racquetball alley, a Roman Catholic church, and a pub. The local primary school, Rossmore National School, subsumed two other local primary schools (Glenough National School and Turraheen National School) following amalgamations over a number of years. As of 2023, Rossmore National School had an enrollment of 88 pupils. There is no secondary school in Rossmore, with bus services bringing pupils to Thurles or Cashel for second-level education.

The local community centre operates a "Broadband Connection Point" which acts as a remote working or study hub.

Hurling is a popular team sport in the area, and hurlers from Rossmore have represented Clonoulty–Rossmore GAA club and the Tipperary county hurling team at a number of age grades.
