= Peter Maher (hurler) =

Irish hurler

Personal information
- Native name: Peadar Ó Meachair (Irish)
- Born: 26 January 1872 Ballycamus, County Tipperary, Ireland
- Died: 18 November 1947 (aged 75) Mullinahone, County Tipperary, Ireland
- Occupation: Farmer

Sport
- Sport: Hurling
Clubs
- Years: Club
- Clonoulty–Rossmore; Suir View
Inter-county
- Years: County
- 1895-1897: Tipperary
Inter-county titles
- Munster titles: 1
- All-Irelands: 1

Peter Maher (26 January 1872 – 18 November 1947) was an Irish hurler. He played hurling with his local clubs Clonoulty–Rossmore and Suir View and was a member of the Tipperary senior hurling team between 1895 and 1897.

== Biography ==
After impressing at club level, Maher joined the Tipperary senior hurling team during the 1895 championship. He won an All-Ireland Championship medal that year after a defeat of Kilkenny in the final. Maher also won a Munster Championship medal that year.

== Honours ==
Tipperary

- All-Ireland Senior Hurling Championship (1): 1895
- Munster Senior Hurling Championship (1): 1895
