= Conor O'Brien (hurler) =

Irish hurler (born 1985)

Personal information
- Native name: Conchur Ó Briain (Irish)
- Born: 30 May 1985 (age 41) Donohill, County Tipperary, Ireland
- Occupation: Garda
- Height: 5 ft 9 in (175 cm)

Sport
- Sport: Hurling
- Position: Centre-back
Club
- Years: Club
- Éire Óg Anacarty
Inter-county*
Years	County	Apps (scores)
2007-2016	Tipperary	19 (0-1)
Inter-county titles
- Munster titles: 5
- All-Irelands: 2
- NHL: 1
- All Stars: 0
- *Inter County team apps and scores correct as of 00:00, 1 November 2012.

Conor O'Brien (born 30 May 1985) is an Irish hurler who played as a corner back for the Tipperary senior team from 2007 until 2016.

O'Brien made his first appearance for the team during the 2007 National League and has become a regular player over the last few seasons. During his playing career he has won one All-Ireland winners' medals, three Munster winners' medals, one National Hurling League winners' medal, one Munster Under-21 Hurling Championship medal, two Munster Minor Hurling Championship medals and two Fitzgibbon Cup medals.

At club level O'Brien is a one-time county intermediate championship medalist with Éire Óg Anacarty.

== Playing career ==
=== Club ===
O’Brien plays his club hurling with his local Éire Óg Anacarty club and in 2006 captured a county intermediate championship with the club.

=== Minor, under-21 and intermediate ===
O'Brien first came to prominence on the inter-county scene as a member of the Tipperary minor hurling team in 2002. He won a Munster medal that year following a defeat of Cork in the provincial decider.

By 2006 O'Brien had joined the Tipperary under-21 team. A 3–11 to 0–13 defeat of Cork gave him a Munster medal in that grade. He later played in the All-Ireland showdown with Kilkenny. An exciting game resulted in a 2-14 apiece draw. Kilkenny narrowly won the replay by 1–11 to 0–11.

O'Brien also enjoyed an unsuccessful four seasons with the Tipperary intermediate hurling team.

=== Senior ===
O'Brien made his senior competitive debut for Tipperary in a National Hurling League game against Dublin in 2007, however, he remained on the periphery of the team for the remainder of the campaign.

In 2008 O'Brien became a regular member of the starting fifteen as Tipp remained undefeated in the National League before meeting Galway in the final. In an exciting game Tipp emerged victorious by 3–18 to 3-16 and O'Brien collected his first National League winners' medal. Tipperary later reached the Munster final where they defeated a resurgent Clare team by 2–21 to 0–19. It was O'Brien's first Munster winners' medal. Tipperary were subsequently defeated in a tense All-Ireland semi-final by Waterford on a scoreline of 1–20 to 1–18. In spite of falling short in the championship, McGrath later collected his first All-Star award.

O'Brien won his second Munster medal in 2009 as Tipp defeated Waterford by 4–14 to 2–16. He played no further part in Tipperary's championship campaign.

After surrendering their Munster title to Cork at the first hurdle in 2010, Tipperray regrouped in the qualifiers and reached a second successive All-Ireland decider. Kilkenny, a team chasing a fifth successive championship, provided the opposition and a great game was expected. Tipperary got off to a great start which was bolstered by an early Lar Corbett goal. He subsequently completed a hat-trick of goals and Tipperary had a fourth by Noel McGrath to deny Kilkenny's drive-for-five and secure a remarkable and convincing 4–17 to 1–18 victory. It was O'Brien's first All-Ireland medal.

After missing the 2011 championship, O'Brien returned to the starting fifteen again in 2012. In spite of an indifferent National League campaign, Tipperary were regarded as potential All-Ireland champions once again. A 2–17 to 0–16 defeat of Waterford in the provincial decider gave O'Brien a third Munster medal. Tipperary later faced a humiliating 4–24 to 1–15 defeat by eventual champions Kilkenny in the All-Ireland semi-final.

On 25 October 2016, O'Brien announced his retirement from inter-county hurling. In a statement he said "Since I first joined the Tipperary senior hurling panel in 2007, I have always felt it a great privilege and honour to represent my county at senior level. Having enjoyed it immensely, I have decided that now is the time to announce my retirement".

=== Inter-provincial ===
O'Brien has also been a regular on the Munster team during various inter-provincial campaigns.
