= John O'Keeffe (Tipperary hurler) =

Irish hurler

Personal information
- Native name: Seán Ó Caoimh (Irish)
- Nickname: The Arse
- Born: 17 November 1988 (age 37) Clonoulty, County Tipperary, Ireland
- Occupation: Student
- Height: 5 ft 10 in (178 cm)

Sport
- Sport: Hurling
- Position: Right wing-back
Club
- Years: Club
- 2004-present: Clonoulty–Rossmore
Club titles
- Tipperary titles: 1
Inter-county*
Years	County	Apps (scores)
2011–2017	Tipperary	5 (0-00)
Inter-county titles
- Munster titles: 3
- All-Irelands: 1
- NHL: 0
- All Stars: 0
- *Inter County team apps and scores correct as of 15:02, 31 October 2012.

John O'Keeffe (born 17 November 1988) is an Irish hurler who currently plays as a right wing-back for the Tipperary senior team.

O'Keeffe made his first appearance for the team during the 2011 National League and has become a regular player over the last few seasons. Since then he has won one Munster winners' medal. He has ended up as an All-Ireland runner-up on one occasion.

At club level O'Keeffe plays with the Clonoulty–Rossmore club.

== Playing career ==
=== Club ===
O'Keeffe made his senior championship debut for Clonoulty–Rossmore in 2004.

He has enjoyed little success with the senior team, losing back-to-back championship deciders in 2010 and 2011.

=== Inter-county ===
O'Keeffe first came to prominence on the inter-county scene as a member of the Tipperary minor hurling team. He enjoyed much success in this grade as Tipperary reached the All-Ireland decider via the "back-door" in 2006. Three-in-a-row hopefuls Galway provided the opposition, however, Tipp powered to 2–18 to 2–7 victory. It was O'Keeffe's sole All-Ireland medal in that grade.

O'Keeffe subsequently joined the Tipperary under-21 team. He won a Munster medal in this grade in his debut season following a controversial one-point defeat of Clare. Tipp later reached the All-Ireland, however, O'Keeffe's side were defeated by Kilkenny.

In 2011 O'Keeffe made his senior debut for Tipp in a National Hurling League game against Waterford. His first championship start came later that year against Cork. A 7–19 to 0-19 trouncing of Waterford in the subsequent provincial decider gave O'Keeffe his first Munster medal. For the third successive year, Tipperary faced off against Kilkenny in the All-Ireland final, however, on this occasion Kilkenny were slight underdogs going up against the new champions. Kilkenny started quickly and never surrendered the lead in the 2–17 to 1–16 victory.

O'Keeffe was dropped from Tipperary's starting fifteen in 2012 but remained on the extended panel of players. He announced his retirement from inter-county hurling in October 2017.
