= Shane Bourke =

Irish hurler, playing for County Tipperary

Personal information
- Born: 9 November 1988 (age 37) County Tipperary
- Occupation: Student

Sport
- Sport: Hurling
- Position: Forward
Clubs
- Years: Club
- J.K. Bracken's Douglas, Cork 2017-
Inter-county
| Years | County | Apps (scores) |
| 2011– | Tipperary | 9 (1-4) |
Inter-county titles
- Munster titles: 3
- All-Irelands: 0
- NHL: 0
- All Stars: 0

Shane Bourke (born 9 November 1988) is an Irish sportsperson. He plays hurling with his local club J.K. Bracken's and with the Tipperary senior inter-county team.

== Career ==
Bourke won an All-Ireland Minor Hurling medal with Tipperary in 2006, and played Under 21 Hurling with Tipperary in 2008 and 2009, winning a Munster Under 21 winners medal in 2008.

He made his senior Tipperary debut in the fourth round of the league on 13 March 2011 against Offaly in a 1–20 to 0–10 win, coming on in the fifth minute as a substitute for the injured Eoin Kelly and scoring three points.

He made his first start on 27 March 2011 in the fifth round of the league against Cork in a 1–14 to 1–14 draw at Páirc Uí Chaoimh. On 3 April 2011 in the sixth round of the league against Galway at Pearse Stadium, Bourke scored 3-4 from play as Tipperary defeated Galway by 4–23 to 1–14.

== Honours ==
=== Tipperary ===
- Munster Senior Hurling Championship (3)
  - 2011, 2012, 2015
- All-Ireland Minor Hurling Championship (1)
  - 2006
- Munster Under-21 Hurling Championship (1)
  - 2008

=== University College Cork ===
- Fitzgibbon Cup (1)
  - 2009 (c)
