= Clonoulty–Rossmore GAA =

Gaelic games club in County Tipperary, Ireland

Clonoulty–Rossmore
- Cluain Ultaigh–Ros Mór
- County: Tipperary
- Nickname: The Botheen Men
- Colours: Green and Gold
- Grounds: Dillon Quirke GAA Grounds
- Coordinates: 52°36′45.14″N 7°57′20.73″W

Playing kits
Standard colours

Senior Club Championships
	All Ireland	Munster champions	Tipperary champions
Hurling:	-	-	4

Clonoulty–Rossmore GAA is a Gaelic Athletic Association club located in the parish of Clonoulty and Rossmore, eleven miles from Cashel, County Tipperary in Ireland. The club is a traditional hurling club which is affiliated to the West Tipperary Board of the GAA.

== History ==
The club was known as Clonoulty in its formative years and were the second winners of the Tipperary Senior Hurling Championship, in 1888. The club, in the name of Clonoulty-Rossmore had to wait 101 years for its second title in 1989 and won its third Championship title in 1997.

The club's first champion team in 1888 (21 aside) was Thaddeus Ryan, John Ryan, Pat Butler, Thomas Harney, William Kennedy, Patsy Hennessy, Cornelius Ahearne, James Garrett, James Ryan, Pat Harney, John O'Dwyer, Joseph Gould, Martin Condon, Edward (Ned) Kennedy, John Murphy, Patsy Kennedy, Thomas Byrne, Daniel Ryan, James O'Dwyer, Pat Ryan, Pat Harney. Substitutes: William Ryan, James English, Jim Quirke, James Ferncombe and Tom Hennessy.

The club acquired its club grounds in 1936, through the policy of reassignment of estate lands by the Irish Land Commission and completed its pavilion in 1957 mainly through the voluntary effort of the members of the Club Committee. Five club players have won All-Ireland Senior Hurling Championship medals with Tipperary - Tony Brennan (1945, 49, 50 & 51), Joe Hayes (1989 & 91), John Kennedy (1989 & 91), Declan Ryan (1989, 91 & 2001) and Aidan Butler (2001). Declan Ryan also captained Tipperary to an All-Ireland Under-21 Hurling Championship in 1989, and two All-Stars with Tipperary senior in 1988 (No 10) and 1997 (No 11).

On 21 October 2018, Clonoulty-Rossmore won their first championship since 1997 after a 0–23 to 2–13 win against Nenagh Éire Óg in the final.

Player Dillon Quirke collapsed and died while playing for the club in a County Senior Championship match against Kilruane at Semple Stadium in August 2022.

== Honours ==
- Tipperary Senior Hurling Championship (4)
  - 1888, 1989, 1997, 2018
- Tipperary County Senior Hurling League (1)
  - 2009
- Tipperary Minor Hurling Championship (2)
  - 1981, 1996.
- West Tipperary Senior Hurling Championship (25)
  - 1930 (Clonoulty), 1931 (Clonoulty), 1932 (Clonoulty), 1933 (Clonoulty), 1951, 1989, 1992, 1996, 1998, 2002, 2007, 2008, 2009, 2010, 2011, 2012, 2016, 2017, 2018, 2019, 2020, 2021, 2022, 2023, 2025
- West Tipperary Senior Hurling League (9)
  - 1945, 1950, 1969, 1985, 1988, 1989, 1991, 1992, 1997
- West Tipperary Junior Hurling Championship (10)
  - 1936 (Clonoulty), 1944, 1945, 1956 (Rossmore), 1958, 1965, 1969, 1973, 1974, 1983.
- West Tipperary Minor (A) Hurling Championship (15)
  - 1969, 1970, 1981, 1982, 1985, 1986, 1996, 1998, 2004, 2005, 2008, 2010, 2011, 2014, 2015
- West Tipperary Minor (B) Hurling Championship (2)
  - 1989, 2002 (with Solohead).
- Tipperary Minor (B) Football Championship (1)
  - 2015
- West Tipperary Minor (B) Football Championship (3)
  - 2011, 2012, 2015
- Tipperary Under-21 A Hurling Championship (1)
  - 2018
- West Tipperary Under-21 (A) Hurling Championship (20)
  - 1971, 1972 (Clonoulty/Éire Óg),), 1973 (Clonoulty/Éire Óg),), 1981, 1982, 1984, 1985, 1988, 1989, 1995, 1996, 2000, 2005, 2006, 2007, 2009, 2011, 2012, 2013, 2014.
- West Tipperary Under-21 (B) Hurling Championship (2)
  - 1991, 1993.
- Tipperary Intermediate Football Championship
  - 1986
- West Tipperary Intermediate Football Championship (3)
  - 1986, 1991, 2020.
- Tipperary Junior A Football Championship: (4)
  - 1969, 1985, 2000, 2016
- West Tipperary Junior Football Championship (7)
  - 1931, 1969, 1985, 1994, 1996, 2000, 2016
- West Tipperary Under-21 (B) Football Championship (1)
  - 1997
- West Tipperary Junior A Hurling Championship (8)
  - 1936 (as Clonoulty), 1944, 1958, 1974, 1983, 2012, 2014, 2016
- Mid Tipperary Junior A Hurling Championship (1)
  - 1919

== Notable players ==
- Tony Brennan
- Aidan Butler
- Phil Byrne
- Anthony Carew
- John Devane
- Tim Gleeson
- Timmy Hammersley
- Joe Hayes
- John Kennedy
- Peter Maher
- John O'Keeffe
- John O'Neill
- Dan Quirke
- Dillon Quirke
- Declan Ryan
- Robert Doyle

== Bibliography ==
- Tipperary's GAA Story (1960), Canon Philip Fogarty
- The Complete Handbook of Gaelic Games (2005), Editor Des Donegan
