= Semple Stadium =

Stadium in Thurles, County Tipperary, Ireland

FBD Semple Stadium
- Tom Semple's Field; The Home of Hurling; Field of Legends; Thurles Sportsfield

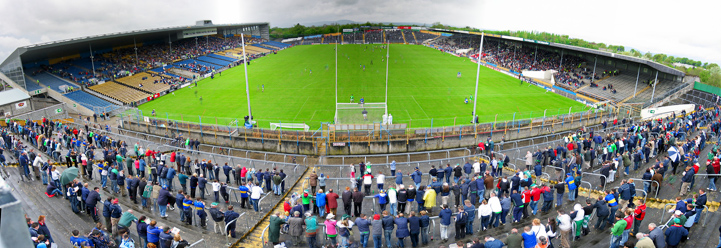
- Interactive map of FBD Semple Stadium
- Location: Thurles, County Tipperary, E41 C956, Ireland
- Coordinates: 52°40′56″N 7°49′30″W
- Owner: Tipperary GAA
- Capacity: 45,690 (24,000 seated)
- Field size: 145 x 90 m
- Public transit: Thurles railway station

Construction
- Groundbreaking: 1910
- Opened: 1910
- Renovated: 1934; 1968; 1981; 2007–2009

Website
- tipperary.gaa.ie

FBD Semple Stadium is the home of hurling and Gaelic football for Tipperary GAA and for the province of Munster. Located in Thurles, County Tipperary, it is the second largest GAA stadium in Ireland (after Croke Park), with a capacity of 45,690 and named after Tom Semple, the captain of the Thurles "Blues". He won All-Ireland Senior Hurling Championship medals in 1900, 1906, and 1908.

The stadium is the leading venue for Munster hurling followers, having hosted the Munster Hurling Final on many memorable occasions.

== Facilities ==
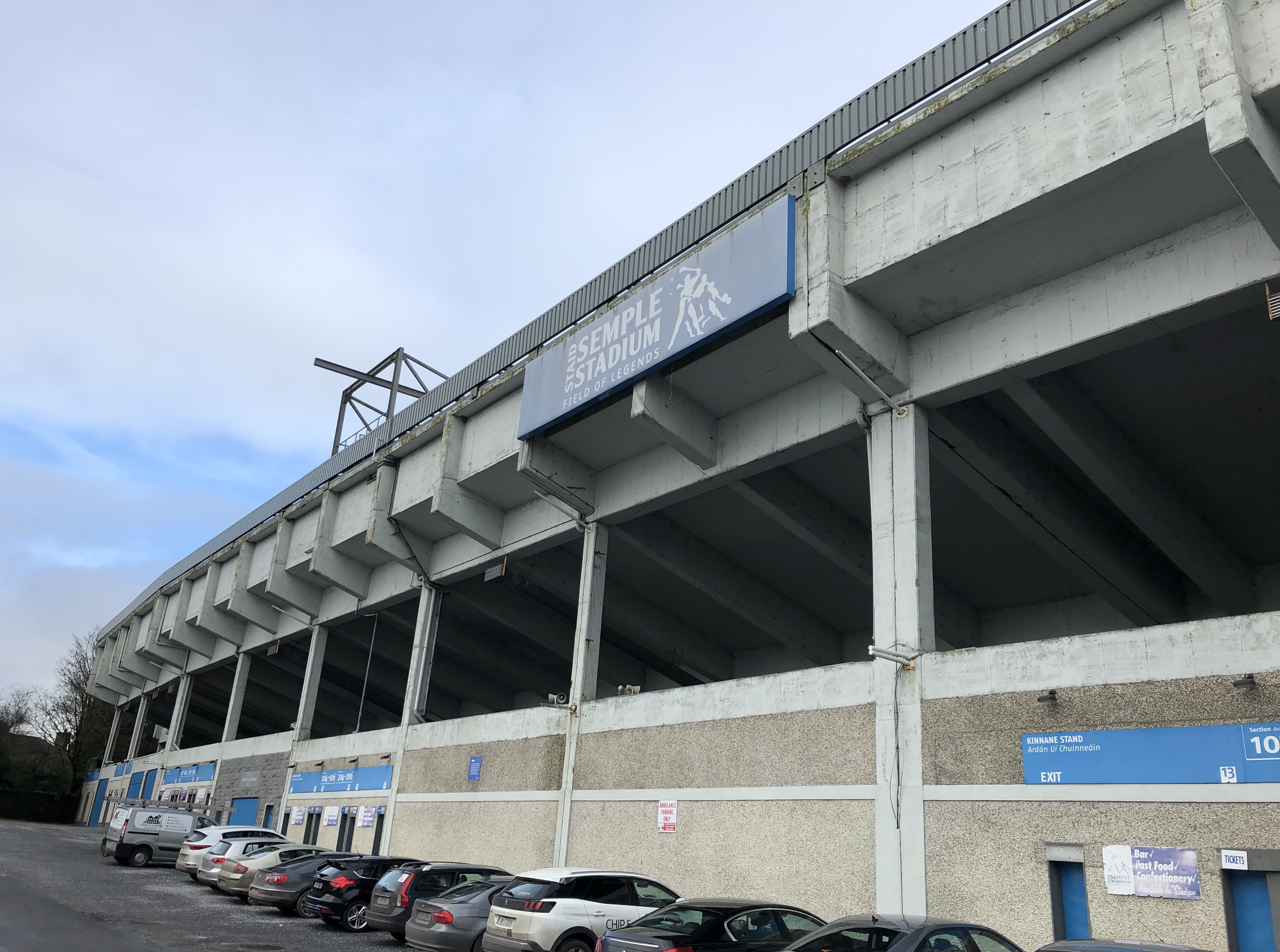
Semple Stadium, exterior south side

The main or 'Old Stand' of the ground (also known as the 'Ardán Ó Coinneáin' or 'Dr Kinane Stand' named after Jeremiah Kinane) lies across from the 'New Stand' (also known as the 'Ardán Ó Riáin') both of which are covered. Behind the goals are two uncovered terraces known as the 'Town End' (also known as the 'Davin Terrace') and the 'Killinan End' (also known as the 'Maher Terrace') respectively.

Currently the stadium has a capacity of 45,690, of which 24,000 are seated.

=== The Dome ===
The sports hall accommodates a full-sized basketball court suitable for national standard competition. The hall is also lined for badminton, volleyball, and indoor soccer. It is used in the evenings and weekends by the Tipperary hurling and football teams for training and on match days; the building is used to accommodate GAA and sponsor guests for corporate lunches and functions. It has also been used as a music venue.

=== Proposed development ===
In July 2018 Tipperary County Board prepared to submit plans to Tipperary County Council to see the Kinane stand redeveloped into a multi-purpose facility.

The proposal would see the "Old Stand" as it is known to many, have a second level created over the concourse at the back of the stand. The half nearest the Killinan End terrace will be dedicated to players and will include a full-sized gym, physio room, stats/analysis room plus changing rooms and toilet facilities. The other half, towards the Sarsfields Centre side, would include a function room to accommodate up to 250 people, with adjoining bar and kitchen facility for catering. The development will also include a new corridor leading to a new VIP enclosure area in the Kinnane stand. The estimated cost of the project is €5 million.

The planning application for the development was lodged with Tipperary County Council in April 2019. The planning application included reconfiguration of the seating area and modifications to the ground floor, including turnstiles, the construction of a new exit gate, and three service cores providing access to upper floor levels, which would include wheelchair-accessible turnstiles. Wilson Architecture in Cork was commissioned to help put together the planning application. Planning permission was granted in April 2020.

== History ==
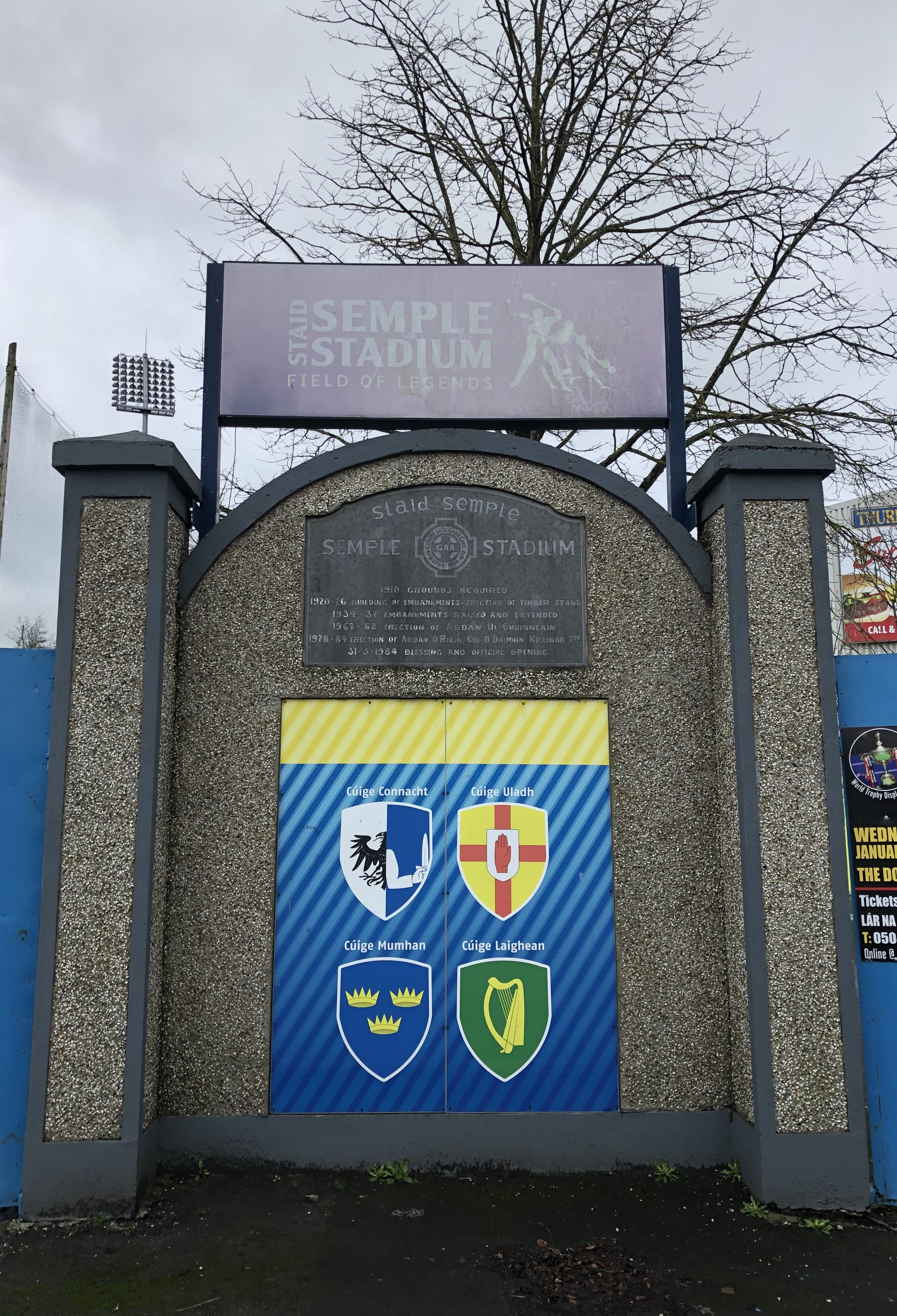
Semple Stadium, north-east corner

The grounds on which Semple Stadium is built were formerly known as Thurles Sportsfield. The site was offered for sale in 1910 at the wish of Canon M.K. Ryan and was purchased by local Gaelic games enthusiasts for £900. To meet the cost of the purchase, an issue of shares was subscribed by the townspeople. The grounds remained in the hands of the shareholders until 1956 when they were transferred to the Gaelic Athletic Association.

In 1934 in anticipation of the All-Ireland Hurling Final being held in the grounds to mark the golden jubilee of the Association, extensive improvements were made to bring the field requirements up to the demands which a crowd of up to 60,000 would make. The embankments around the field were raised and extended and the stand accommodation was also extended. However, the jubilee final was held in Croke Park and it was another 50 years before the stadium would host the All-Ireland final as a showpiece to mark the centenary.

In 1968 further developments took place when the Dr. Kinane Stand was completed and opened. In 1971 the stadium was named after Tom Semple, who was captain of the Thurles "Blues". He won All-Ireland Senior Hurling Championship medals in 1900, 1906 and 1908. The Ardán Ó Riáin opposite the Kinane Stand and the terracing at the town end of the field were completed in 1981 at a cost of £500,000. This development and the terracing at the Killinan end of the field were part of a major improvement scheme for the celebration of the centenary All-Ireland Hurling Final between Cork and Offaly in 1984.

Dublin v Kerry in the quarter-finals of the 2001 All-Ireland Senior Football Championship was held at Semple Stadium.

In April 2006 Tipperary County Board announced an €18 million redevelopment plan for the Stadium. The three-year project aimed to boost capacity to over 55,000, as well as providing a wide range of modern facilities such as corporate space concessions, dining and changing areas within both main stands. There were also plans to upgrade the standing terraces and install a modern floodlighting facility. Phase one of the upgrade project, upgrading the Kinnane Stand side of the stadium, involved expenditure of €5.5 million.

On 14 February 2009 the new state of the art floodlights were switched on by GAA President Nickey Brennan before the National Hurling League game against Cork.

In 2016, Hawk-Eye was installed in the stadium and used for the first time during the Munster Championship quarter-final between Tipperary and Cork.

After 28 minutes of play in a 2022 Tipperary Senior Hurling Championship game for Clonoulty–Rossmore against Kilruane at Semple Stadium, Dillon Quirke collapsed and died.

An architectural consultancy has been appointed to lead a design team, tasked with preparing a master plan for the redevelopment of Semple Stadium.

=== Music festival ===
The Féile Festival, ran from 1990 to 1994 (and returned in 1997 for one day), was held at Semple Stadium. At the height of its success, an estimated 150,000 people attended the festival, which was also known as "The Trip to Tipp". Irish and international artists participated, including The Prodigy, The Cranberries, Blur, Bryan Adams, Van Morrison, Rage Against the Machine, The Saw Doctors and Christy Moore.

The Féile Classical Concerts took place at Semple Stadium in September 2018. Line up included Irish musical acts that played in the 1990s at the Féile festivals. Named as Tipp Classical, it will return in September 2019.

== Transport ==
=== Rail ===
Semple Stadium is a five-minute walk from Thurles railway station. The station is on the Dublin to Cork main rail line with connections to Limerick and Tralee lines. Iarnród Éireann operates 'GAA Specials' to the station on the date of certain matches at Semple stadium.

== Naming rights ==
In 2022, FBD Insurance entered into a naming rights agreement which provided for the stadium to be referred to as "FBD Semple Stadium".

== Images ==
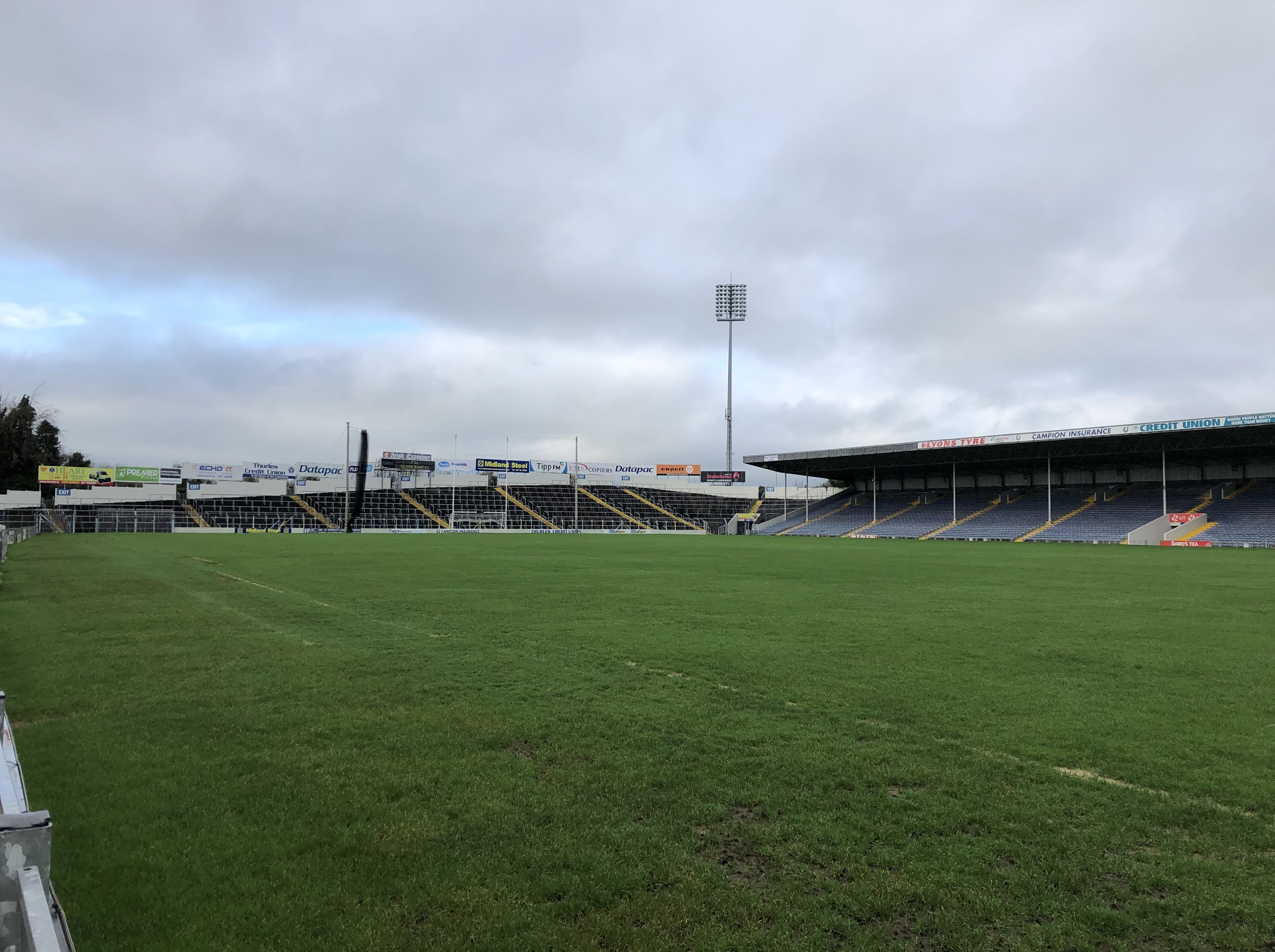
Killinan End (west seating) and New Stand (north seating)

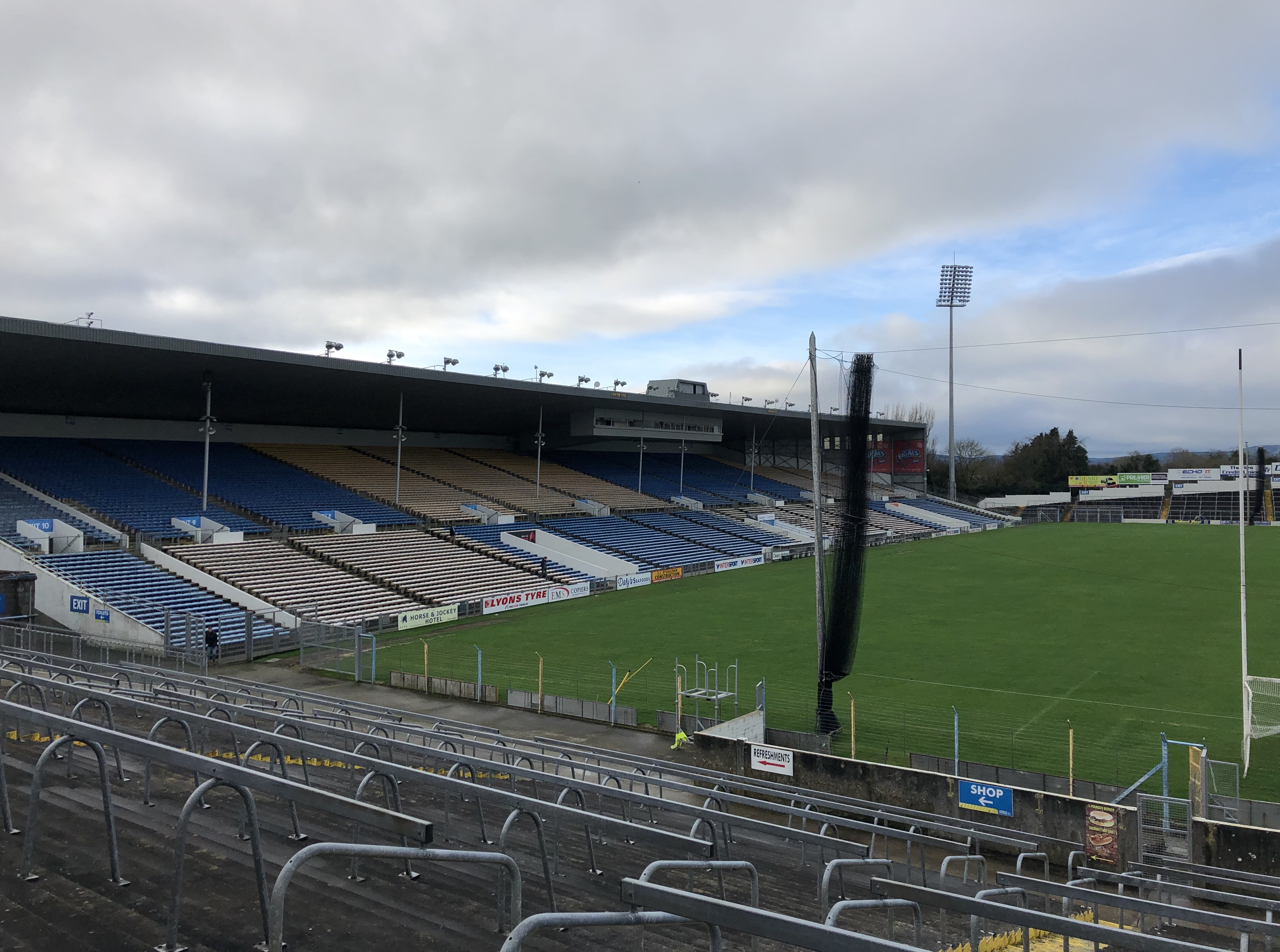
Old Stand, looking from the Town End

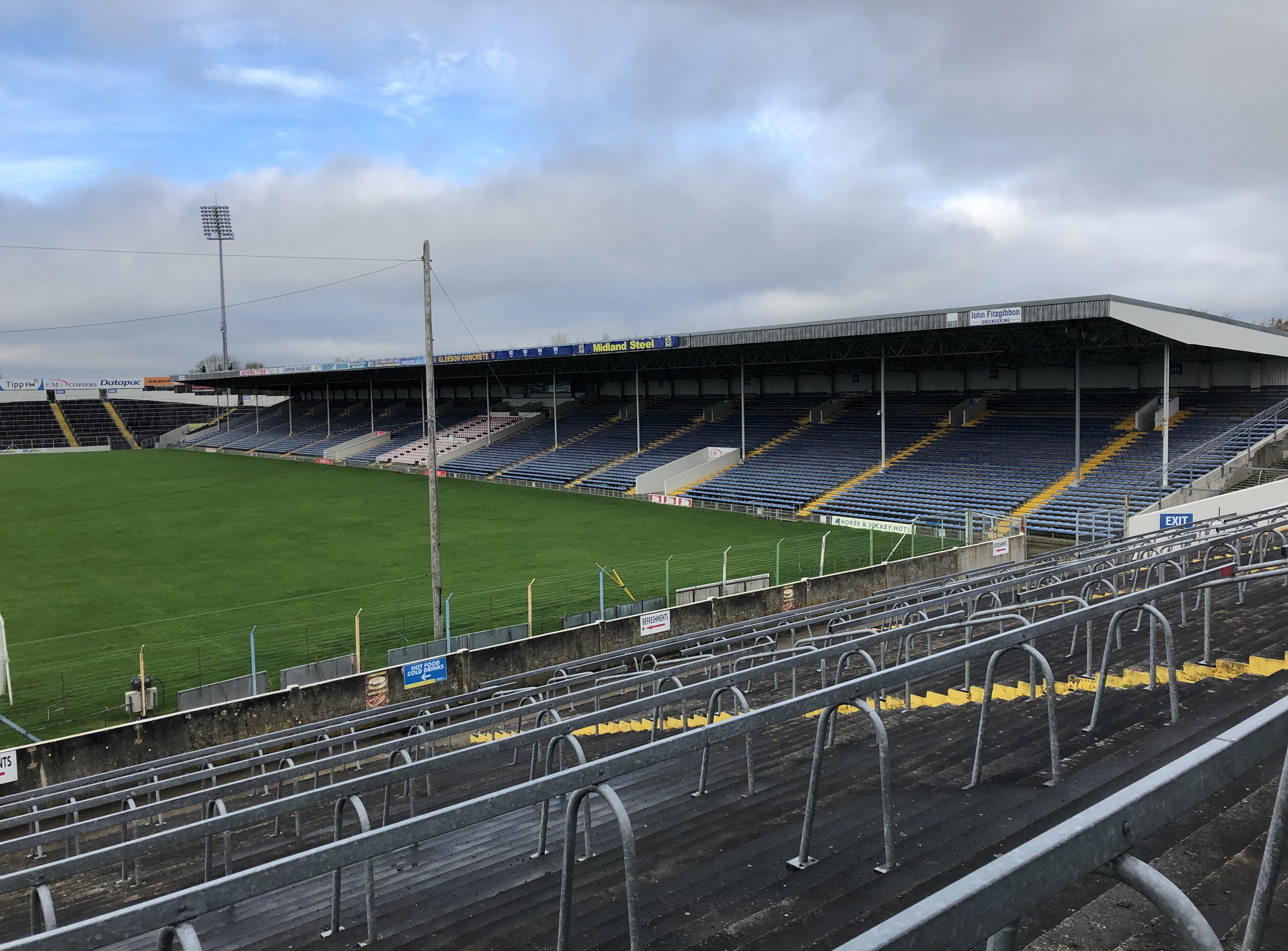
New Stand, looking from the Town End

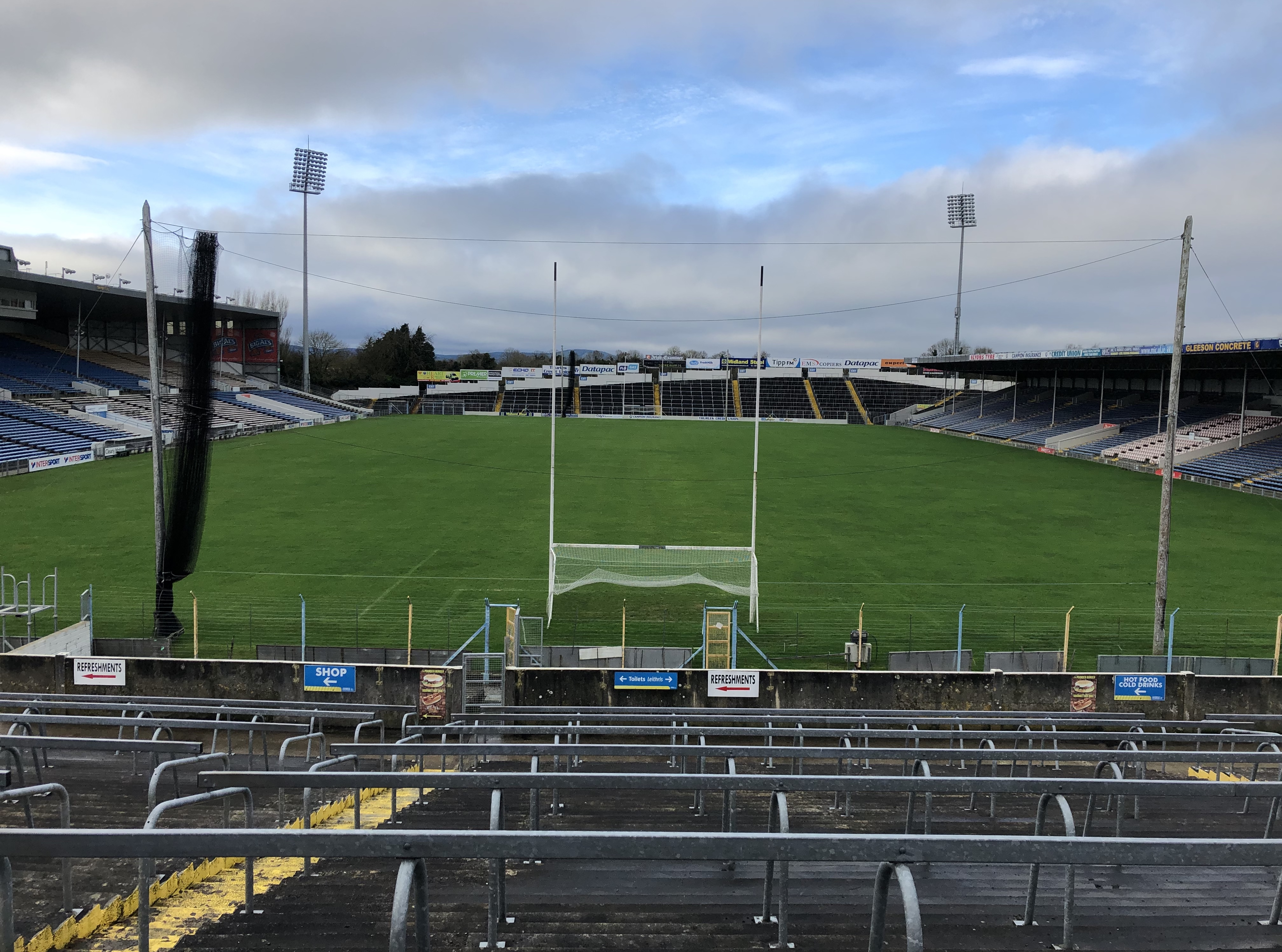
Semple Stadium field view from Town End (east seating area)

== See also ==
- List of Gaelic Athletic Association stadiums
- List of stadiums in Ireland by capacity

| Preceded by Croke Park; Dublin | All-Ireland Senior Hurling Championship; Final Venue; 1984 | Succeeded by Croke Park; Dublin |
