= Clonoulty =

Village in County Tipperary, Ireland

Clonoulty Cluain Abhla
- Village
- Location in Ireland
- Coordinates: 52.603°N 7.959°W
- Country: Ireland
- Province: Munster
- County: Tipperary
- Elevation: 90 m (300 ft)

Clonoulty (Irish: Cluain Abhla, meaning 'meadow of the apple tree') is a small village and a civil parish in County Tipperary, Ireland. It is one of nine civil parishes in the barony of Kilnamanagh Lower. It is also one half of the ecclesiastical parish of Clonoulty-Rossmore in the Roman Catholic Archdiocese of Cashel and Emly. Clonoulty may also refer to a slightly larger area which forms one half of the catchment area for Clonoulty-Rossmore GAA club.

== Location ==
Clonoulty is on the R661 road, 15 km (9 mi) southwest of Thurles and 22 km (14 mi) northeast of Tipperary town. Holycross and its eponymous abbey is 8 km (5 mi) away on the Thurles road. Cashel and the Rock of Cashel are approximately 12 km (7 mi) away.

== History ==
A Knights Templar preceptory was established at Castlequarter in the 12th century when Clonoulty was called Clonaul. William de Warenne was one of the few Templars, of which two were actually a knight, recorded to have been arrested in Ireland during the Trials of the Templars. He was custos at Clonaul and a former master of the order in Ireland. It may be linked to the former fulling mill at Rossmore with its 950-metre mill race. Stocks of white cloth, robes in coloured wool and valuable horses were recorded at the Clonaul Preceptory. It was one of the seven important Irish preceptories transferred to the Knights Hospitaller, who were here until the dissolution of the monasteries.

The Calendar of Patent Rolls of Ireland records difficulties from 1582 onwards with Clonoulty rent collection for land which had passed into Crown control after the dissolution of the monasteries. Lands were burned, spoiled and remained waste for up to three years.

The Irish language derivation of the name 'Clonoulty' is given as Cluain Abhla or Cluain Ula, meaning 'meadow of the apple tree (or orchard)'. 'Cluain an Ultaigh' is also given as a derivation, associated with a belief that Donal Cam O'Sullivan Beare and his followers spent a night in the Clonoulty area as they fled their native territory based in the present day Beara Peninsula.

During the 1800s, many people from the area emigrated to Australia. Boorowa, New South Wales (the Tipperary of the South) was settled by Europeans who were mainly Irish convicts transported from Clonoulty after political activity against the British in 1815.

On 12 August 1848, Thomas Francis Meagher was arrested on the road between Clonoulty and Holycross. Seventeen years later, on 12 August 1865 a single stone meteorite of 4 lb 14.5oz was seen to fall and was recovered from a local field.

Clonoulty was the home of Eamon Ó Duibhir, the Irish Republican Brotherhood member and officer of the Irish Volunteers. Seán Hogan, of the Third Tipperary Brigade, was captured by the Royal Irish Constabulary (RIC) on the morning of 11 May 1919, after leaving a dance at his house. In an event known as the Rescue at Knocklong, Hogan was rescued the following day at Knocklong railway station, during which two of his four-man RIC escort were shot.

On 31 March 1920, during the War of Independence, an RIC hut here was attacked by the 2nd Battalion of the South Tipperary Brigade. The defense was successfully led by Sgt Patrick McDonnell who was subsequently assassinated on 10 May of the same year at Goold's Cross railway station on his way to the RIC hut.

== Facilities ==
Clonoulty has a post office, two pubs, two shops, a petrol station and a primary school. The primary (national) school which serves the civil parish, Clonoulty National School, had over 80 pupils enrolled as of the 2019/2020 school year. There is also a primary school in the nearby village of Rossmore (3 km away).

The local Roman Catholic church is dedicated to St John the Baptist, and was built in 1878. A former Church of Ireland church, now in use as a funeral home, was built in 1856 and closed in 1976. A Sheela na Gig, discovered in Clonoulty's graveyard in the 1980s, is now held in the Bolton Library in Cashel.

The grounds of the local GAA club, Clonoulty–Rossmore GAA, includes two pitches and a children's playground.
