= 2011 Tipperary county hurling team season =

Tipperary county hurling team
2011 season
Manager	Declan Ryan
All-Ireland SHC	Runners-up
Munster SHC	Winners
National League	Fourth in Division 1
Top scorer	Eoin Kelly (4-30) Championship
Highest SHC attendance	81,214 vs Kilkenny
- Lowest SHC attendance
Colours

== Season summary ==
On 9 November 2010, Declan Ryan was appointed as the new Tipperary Senior hurling manager on a two-year term, succeeding Liam Sheedy. He was joined by Tommy Dunne as the new team coach, with Michael Gleeson of Tipperary county champions Thurles Sarsfields completing the new Tipperary hurling management team. Tipperarys first game of 2011 was in January in the 2011 Waterford Crystal Cup against WIT where they were defeated by a scoreline of 2–17 to 1–19 in Clonmel. Their first league game took place on 12 February against Kilkenny, which finished in a 1–10 to 1–17 defeat at Semple Stadium. The first league win came in the third round on 5 March against Waterford by 1–20 to 0-18 under the floodlights at Semple Stadium. Tipperary finished in fourth place in division 1 and missed out on qualifying for the league final, which was won by Dublin. On 29 May, Tipperary started their championship season by defeating Cork by 3–22 to 0–23 at Semple Stadium. On 10 July, in the Munster Final, Tipperary defeated Waterford by 7–19 to 0–19 at Páirc Uí Chaoimh. Tipperary got past Dublin in the semi-final to meet Kilkenny in the 2011 All-Ireland Senior Hurling Championship Final where they were defeated by 2–17 to 1-16. Tipperary GAA were sponsored by Skoda in 2011. In October 2011 Benny Dunne announced his retirement from the inter-county hurling squad.

=== Tipperary Senior hurling squad 2011 ===
- Statistics correct to the end of 2011 Season

Name	Position	Club	Age	Apps	Goals	Points
Brendan Cummins	1. Goalkeeper	Ballybacon-Grange	36	61	0	1
Darren Gleeson	1. Goalkeeper	Portroe	28	1	0	0
Paul Curran	2. Full back	Mullinahone	30	32	0	0
John Coughlan	2. Full back	Moyne-Templetuohy	31	29	0	1
Pádraic Maher	2. Full back	Thurles Sarsfields	21	10	0	0
Paddy Stapleton	2. Full back	Borrisoleigh	24	10	0	0
David Young	2. Full back	Toomevara	24	4	0	4
Eddie Connolly	2. Full back	Loughmore-Castleiney	20	0	0	0
Michael Cahill	2. Half back	Thurles Sarsfields	21	5	0	0
Conor O'Mahoney	3. Half back	Newport	25	27	0	6
Brendan Maher	3. Half back	Borris-Ileigh	21	10	0	5
John O'Keefe	3. Half back	Clonoulty-Rossmore	21	0	0	0
Shane McGrath	4. Midfield	Ballinahinch	25	23	0	17
Benny Dunne	4. Midfield	Toomevara	30	35	4	29
Séamus Hennessy	4. Midfield	Kilruane MacDonaghs	21	3	0	1
Gearóid Ryan	4. Midfield	Templederry Kenyons	22	7	1	9
James Woodlock	4. Midfield	Drom-Inch GAA	24	12	0	5
Pat Kerwick	5. Half forward	Killenaule	28	8	1	10
Séamus Callinan	5. Half forward	Drom-Inch GAA	22	13	6	20
Michael Gleeson	5. Half forward	Thurles Sarsfields	24	0	0	0
Pa Bourke	5. Half forward	Thurles Sarsfields	22	9	0	1
John O'Brien	5. Half forward	Toomevara	27	21	2	28
Sean Carey	5. Half forward	Moyle Rovers	22	0	0	0
Noel McGrath	5. Half forward	Loughmore-Castleiney	20	10	1	29
Patrick 'Bonnar' Maher	5. Half forward	Lorrha-Dorrha	22	5	1	3
Eoin Kelly	6. Full forward	Mullinahone	29	48	17	319
Lar Corbett	6. Full forward	Thurles Sarsfields	30	42	16	58
John O'Neill	6. Full forward	Clonoulty-Rossmore	19	0	0	0
Brian O'Meara	6. Full forward	Kilruane MacDonaghs	21	2	0	0
Michael Heffernan	6. Full forward	Éire Óg, Nenagh	21	1	0	0
Shane Bourke	6. Full forward	J.K. Bracken's	22	0	0	0

=== Division 1 ===
==== Table ====
Team	Pld	W	D	L	F	A	Diff	Pts
Kilkenny	7	5	1	1	12–114	9–100	21	11
Dublin	7	4	2	1	10–125	13–95	21	10
Waterford	7	4	1	2	8–112	7–119	-4	9
Tipperary	7	3	2	2	9–119	5–103	28	8
Galway	7	4	0	3	10–120	10–103	17	8
Cork	7	2	1	4	6–110	5–109	4	5
Wexford	7	1	1	5	5–96	10–120	-38	3
Offaly (R)	7	1	0	6	7–101	9–149	-53	2

- Tipperary were placed ahead of Galway as they won the head–to–head match between the teams (3 April at Pearse Stadium: 4–23 – 1–14)

12 February 2011 Round 1	Tipperary	1–10 – 1–17	Kilkenny	Semple Stadium, Thurles
7:30 p.m.	P Bourke 0–4 (4f), G Ryan 1–0, N McGrath 0–2 (1s–l), S McGrath, J O'Neill, Patrick Maher, T Hammersley 0–1 each.	Report	R Hogan 0–10 (8f), C Fennelly 1–0, A Fogarty, J Mulhall 0–2 each, M Fennelly, E Brennan, T Walsh 0–1 each.	Attendance: 9,495; Referee: B Gavin (Offaly)

19 February 2011 Round 2	Dublin	1–16 – 1–15	Tipperary	Parnell Park, Donnycarney
5:45 p.m.	C Keaney 0–14 (10f), D O'Dwyer 1–0, L Rushe, J Boland 0–1 each.	Report	P Bourke 0–6 (2f), J O'Neill 1–2, S McGrath 0–3(1f), D Young (s–l), M Gleeson, B O'Meara, E Kelly 0–1 each.	Referee: J Sexton (Cork)

5 March 2011 Round 3	Tipperary	1–20 – 0–18	Waterford	Semple Stadium, Thurles
7:30 p.m.	P Bourke 0–8 (4f), N McGrath 0–7, P Kelly 1–0, E Kelly 0–2, D Young, Padraic Maher & B Maher 0–1 each.	Report	R Foley 0–12 (9f), S Prendergast 0–2, S Molumphy, M Shanahan, S Walsh & T Ryan 0–1 each.	Referee: J Owens (Westmeath)

13 March 2011 Round 4	Tipperary	1–20 – 0–10	Offaly	Nenagh
2:30 p.m.	P Bourke 0–7 (0–3f), B Dunne, B Maher 0–4 each, G Ryan 1–1, S Bourke 0–3, J O'Keeffe 0–1.	Report	B Carroll 0–4f, M Cordial, J Bergin 0–2 each, D Currams, C Egan 0–1 each.	Referee: J McGrath (Westmeath)

27 March 2011 Round 5	Cork	1–14 – 1–14	Tipperary	Páirc Uí Chaoimh, Cork
2:30 p.m.	L O'Farrell 1–1, B O'Connor 0–4f, C McCarthy 0–3 (1 s–l), J Gardiner 0–2f, R Curran, C Naughton, J O'Connor P Cronin 0–1 each	Report	P Bourke 0–6 (3f, 2 '65's), B Dunne 1–2, N McGrath 0–3, J O'Brien, B O'Meara, G Ryan 0–1 each	Referee: M Wadding (Waterford)

3 April 2011 Round 6	Galway	1–14 – 4–23	Tipperary	Pearse Stadium, Galway
2:30 p.m.	G Farragher 0–5 (4f), E Forde 1–2, A Smith 0–2, A Cullinan, J Coen, A Harte, D Burke, I Tannian 0–1 each	Report	S Bourke 3–4, J O’Brien 1–1, P Bourke, (1f 1 '65'), L Corbett, P Maher 0–4, each, S Carey (1f) 0–2, B Dunne, B O’Meara, G Ryan, S McGrath 0–1 each	Referee: J Owens (Wexford)

17 April 2011 Round 7	Tipperary	0–17 – 1–14	Wexford	Semple Stadium, Thurles
2:30 p.m.	P Bourke 0–6 (3f, 1 '65'), J O'Brien 0–4, J Woodlock 0–3, N McGrath 0–2, S Carey and M Heffernan 0–1 each	Report	J Berry 0–5 (3f), R Jacob 0–4, W Doran 1–0.	Referee: D Kirwan (Cork)

=== 2011 All-Ireland Senior Hurling Championship ===
The 2011 GAA Hurling All-Ireland Senior Championship was the 123rd staging of the All-Ireland championship since its establishment in 1887. The draw for the 2011 fixtures took place on 7 October 2010. The championship began on 14 May and ended on 4 September 2011. Tipperary were the defending champions.

Kilkenny retained the title after a 2–17 to 1–16 defeat of Tipperary in the final.

=== Munster Senior Hurling Championship ===
29 May 2011
4:00pm
Quarter-final

Tipperary	3-22 - 0-23	Cork
E Kelly 1-07 (0-05f), L Corbett 1-02, S Callanan 0-05, N McGrath 0-04 (2 sls), B Dunne 1-00, J O'Brien 0-02, Patrick Maher & J Woodlock 0-01 each.	Report	P Horgan 0-13 (10f), N McCarthy & B O'Connor 0-03 each, J Gardiner, P Cronin, C McCarthy & P O'Sullivan 0-01 each.

Semple Stadium, Thurles
Attendance: 31,231
Referee: B. Gavin (Offaly)

19 June 2011
4:00pm
Semi-final

Clare	1-19 - 4-19	Tipperary
C McGrath (1-06, 4f), J Conlon (0-03), C McInerney (0-02); D McMahon (0-02), J Clancy (0-02); J McInerney (0-01, f), N O'Connell (0-01), F Lynch (0-01), D Honan (0-01),	Report	S Callanan (1-05), E Kelly (1-03, 2f), L Corbett (1-00), Patrick Maher (1-00), N McGrath (0-03), Padraic Maher (0-02); G Ryan (0-02), S McGrath (0-02), P Bourke (0-02).

Gaelic Grounds, Limerick
Attendance: 16,700
Referee: J Owens (Wexford)

10 July 2011
4:00pm
Final

Tipperary	7-19 - 0-19	Waterford
L Corbett 4-4, E Kelly 2-6 (0-3f), S Callanan 1-00, J O’Brien 0-03, N McGrath (0-1sl), P Bourke 0-2 each, G Ryan, S Bourke 0-1 each.	Report	P Mahony 0-13 (0-12f), T Browne, S O’Sullivan, J Mullane, S Walsh, S Molumphy, M Shanahan 0-1 each.

Páirc Uí Chaoimh, Cork
Attendance: 36,654
Referee: B Gavin (Offaly)

=== All-Ireland Senior Hurling Championship ===
14 August 2011
3:30pm
Semi-final

Tipperary	1-19 - 0-18	Dublin
L Corbett (1-3), E Kelly (0-6, 2f, 3 '65), N McGrath (0-3, 1 sideline), Padraic Maher (0-2), G Ryan (0-2), P Bourke (0-1), S McGrath (0-1), S Callanan (0-1).	Report	P Ryan (0-9, 6f, 1 '65), P Kelly (0-1), J Boland (0-1), A McCrabbe (0-1), R O'Dwyer (0-1), L Rushe (0-1), D O'Callaghan (0-1), L Ryan (0-1), M O'Brien (0-1), S Ryan (0-1).

Croke Park, Dublin
Attendance: 43,562
Referee: C McAllister (Cork)

4 September 2011
3:30pm
Final

Kilkenny	2-17 - 1-16	Tipperary
H Shefflin (0-7, 5f), R Hogan (1-1), M Fennelly (1-0), R Power (0-2), C Fennelly (0-2), E Larkin (0-2), M Rice (0-1), E Brennan (0-1), TJ Reid (0-1).	Report	E Kelly (0-8, 7f, 1 '65), P Bourke (1-0), N McGrath (0-3, 1 sideline), G Ryan (0-2), C O'Mahony (0-1), J O'Brien (0-1), B Dunne (0-1).

Croke Park, Dublin
Attendance: 81,214
Referee: B Gavin (Offaly)
