= 2012 Munster Senior Hurling Championship final =

- Event: 2012 Munster Senior Hurling Championship
Tipperary	Waterford
2-17	0-16
- Date: 15 July 2012
- Venue: Páirc Uí Chaoimh, Cork
- Man of the Match: Kevin Moran
- Referee: C. McAllister (Cork)
- Attendance: 26,438
- Weather: Intermittent rain and sunshine

The 2012 Munster Senior Hurling Championship final was a hurling match played on 15 July 2012 at Páirc Uí Chaoimh, Cork. The winners advanced to the semi-finals of the All-Ireland Senior Hurling Championship, while the loser went into the All-Ireland qualifiers. Tipperary and Waterford contested the game, with Tipperary captained by Paul Curran retaining their title, their 40th Munster title overall with a seven-point victory.

== Previous Munster Final encounters ==
Date	Venue	Tipperary score	Waterford score	Match report
23 August 1925	Fraher Field, Dungarvan	6-06 (24)	1-02 (5)	
6 July 1958	Semple Stadium, Thurles	4-12 (24)	1-05 (8)	
5 August 1962	Gaelic Grounds, Limerick	5-14 (29)	2-03 (9)	
28 July 1963	Gaelic Grounds, Limerick	0-08 (8)	0-11 (11)	
2 July 1989	Páirc Uí Chaoimh, Cork	0-26 (26)	2-08 (14)	Irish Times
30 June 2002	Páirc Uí Chaoimh, Cork	3-12 (21)	2-23 (29)	Irish Independent
12 July 2009	Semple Stadium, Thurles	4-14 (26)	2-16 (22)	RTÉ Sport
10 July 2011	Páirc Uí Chaoimh, Cork	7-19 (40)	0-19 (19)	Irish Independent

== Build-up ==
Lar Corbett was named at right half forward in the starting fifteen for Tipperary for the first time since the 2011 All-Ireland Senior Hurling Championship final defeat to Kilkenny, replacing the injured Gearóid Ryan. It was the only change to the Tipperary team from the one that defeated Cork 1–22 to 0–24 in the semi-final. Waterford named veteran Tony Browne in their starting fifteen at right half-back in place of Richie Foley, with Noel Connors picked at corner-back ahead of Aidan Kearney, while Pauric Mahony was in at number ten instead of Eoin Kelly.

== Match ==
=== Details ===
15 July 2012
Final

Tipperary	2-17 - 0-16	Waterford
J. O'Brien 1-03; S. Bourke 1-01; N. McGrath 0-03; E. Kelly 0-03 (0-02f); B. O'Meara 0-02; P. Bourke 0-02 (0-02f); Pádraic Maher 0-01; S. McGrath 0-01; M. Cahill 0-01	(Report)	M. Shanahan 0-08 (0-05f, 0-01 '65'); J. Mullane 0-03; S. Walsh 0-02; Pauric Mahony 0-01; S. Molumphy 0-01; E. Kelly 0-01 (0-01f)

Páirc Uí Chaoimh, Cork
Attendance: 26,438
Referee: C. McAllister (Cork)

Tipperary	Waterford

TIPPERARY:
1	Brendan Cummins
2	Paddy Stapleton
3	Paul Curran (c)
4	Michael Cahill
5	John O'Keeffe
6	Conor O'Mahony
7	Pádraic Maher
8	Gearóid Ryan
9	Shane McGrath
10	Séamus Callanan
11	Noel McGrath
12	Séamus Callanan
13	Eoin Kelly
14	John O'Brien
15	Lar Corbett
Substitutes:
16	Darren Gleeson
17	Pa Bourke
18	Shane Bourke
19	Benny Dunne
20	Stephen Lillis
21	Brendan Maher
22	Paddy Murphy
23	Brian O'Meara
24	Paddy Stapleton
25	James Woodlock
26	David Young
Manager:
Declan Ryan

WATERFORD:
1	Clinton Hennessy
2	Darragh Fives
3	Jerome Maher
4	Noel Connors
5	Tony Browne
6	Michael Walsh
7	Kevin Moran
8	Stephen Molumphy (c)
9	Richie Foley
21	Eoin McGrath
11	Shane O'Sullivan
12	Pauric Mahony
13	John Mullane
14	Shane Walsh
15	Brian O'Sullivan
Substitutes:
10	Maurice Shanahan
16	Adrian Power
17
18
19
20
22
23
24
25
26
Manager:
Davy FitzGerald

== Reaction ==
After the match Tipperary manager Declan Ryan mentioned that he was still looking for more from his players, saying "I don't think we played as well as we could have in the first half, The guys battled well and we were delighted to go in level at half-time. We finished very strongly and that's always pleasing, We've done that in the last couple of games. We can be very happy with our finish anyway."
