= Tipperary–Waterford hurling rivalry =

Tipperary-Waterford
- First meeting: 1901
- Latest meeting: 17 April 2022
- Next meeting: TBD

Statistics
- Total meetings: 47
- All-time series (Championship only): Tipperary 33–12 Waterford (2 draws in 1933,2018)
- Largest victory: Tipperary 8-21 : 0-4 Waterford (1904)

The Tipperary–Waterford rivalry is a hurling rivalry between Irish county teams Tipperary and Waterford. Both teams play in the Munster Senior Hurling Championship and the All-Ireland Senior Hurling Championship.

They have met in the All-Ireland Championship on four occasions with Waterford winning three times, the 2006 Quarter-Final, 2008 Semi-Final and the 2021 Quarter-Final, while Tipperary were successful in the 2010 Semi-Final.

== All-Ireland Championship meetings ==
Date	Venue	Tipperary score	Waterford score	Match report
23 July 2006	Croke Park, Dublin	3-13(22)	1-22 (25)	Irish Exminer
17 August 2008	Croke Park, Dublin	1-18 (21)	1-20 (23)	RTE Sport
15 August 2010	Croke Park, Dublin	3-19 (28)	1-18 (21)	RTE Sport
31 July 2021	Páirc Uí Chaoimh, Cok	2-27 (33)	4-28 (40)	RTE Sport

== Munster Final meetings ==
Date	Venue	Tipperary score	Waterford score	Match report
23 August 1925	Fraher Field, Dungarvan	6-06 (24)	1-02 (5)	
6 July 1958	Semple Stadium, Thurles	4-12 (24)	1-05 (8)	
5 August 1962	Gaelic Grounds, Limerick	5-14 (29)	2-03 (9)	
28 July 1963	Gaelic Grounds, Limerick	0-08 (8)	0-11 (11)	
2 July 1989	Páirc Uí Chaoimh, Cork	0-26 (26)	2-08 (14)	Irish Times
30 June 2002	Páirc Uí Chaoimh, Cork	3-12 (21)	2-23 (29)	GAA.ie
12 July 2009	Semple Stadium, Thurles	4-14 (26)	2-16 (22)	RTE Sport
10 July 2011	Páirc Uí Chaoimh, Cork	7-19 (40)	0-19 (19)	Irish Independent
15 July 2012	Páirc Uí Chaoimh, Cork	2-17 (23)	0-16 (16)	Irish Examiner
12 July 2015	Semple Stadium, Thurles	0-21 (21)	0-16 (16)	Irish Examiner
10 July 2016	Gaelic Grounds, Limerick	5-19 (34)	0-13 (13)	Irish Examiner
