= 2011 Munster Senior Hurling Championship final =

- Event: 2011 Munster Senior Hurling Championship
Tipperary	Waterford
7-19	0-19
- Date: 10 July 2011
- Venue: Páirc Uí Chaoimh, Cork
- Man of the Match: Lar Corbett
- Referee: Brian Gavin (Offaly)
- Attendance: 36,654
- Weather: Dry with patchy sunshine

The 2011 Munster Senior Hurling Championship final was a hurling match played on 10 July 2011 at Páirc Uí Chaoimh, Cork. It was contested by Tipperary and Waterford. The match pitted the 2010 All-Ireland Hurling Champions against the 2010 Munster Hurling Champions. For the first time ever, both Waterford's Senior and Minor hurling teams were making their third Munster Final appearance in a row. It was the first time the two teams had met in a Munster Senior Hurling Championship Final at Páirc Uí Chaoimh since the 2002 Munster Senior Hurling Championship final.

Tipperary won the game by a margin of 21 points, to claim their third Munster title in four years. It was the largest winning margin in a Munster Final since the 1982 decider between Cork and Waterford, and the first time since 1936 that one team managed to score at least 7 goals.

== Previous Munster Final encounters ==
Date	Venue	Tipperary score	Waterford score	Match report
23 August 1925	Fraher Field, Dungarvan	6-06 (24)	1-02 (5)	
6 July 1958	Semple Stadium, Thurles	4-12 (24)	1-05 (8)	
5 August 1962	Gaelic Grounds, Limerick	5-14 (29)	2-03 (9)	
28 July 1963	Gaelic Grounds, Limerick	0-08 (8)	0-11 (11)	
2 July 1989	Páirc Uí Chaoimh, Cork	0-26 (26)	2-08 (14)	Irish Times
30 June 2002	Páirc Uí Chaoimh, Cork	3-12 (21)	2-23 (29)	Irish Examiner
12 July 2009	Semple Stadium, Thurles	4-14 (26)	2-16 (22)	RTE Sport

== Team selection ==
Waterford manager Davy Fitzgerald made three changes to the team that overcame Limerick in the semi-final, with Jerome Maher picked at full-back and making his championship debut. Tipperary made one change to their team to the team that defeated Clare in the semi-final, with Paddy Stapleton coming into the team in place of David Young at right corner-back.

== Match ==
=== Details ===
10 July 2011
Final

Tipperary	7-19 - 0-19	Waterford
L. Corbett 4-4; E. Kelly 2-6 (0-3f); S. Callanan 1-00; J. O'Brien 0-03; N. McGrath 0-2 (0-1sl); P. Bourke 0-2; G. Ryan 0-1; S. Bourke 0-1	(Report)	Pauric Mahony 0-13 (0-12f); T. Browne 0-1; S. O'Sullivan 0-1; J. Mullane 0-1; S. Walsh 0-1; S. Molumphy 0-1; M. Shanahan 0-1

Páirc Uí Chaoimh, Cork
Attendance: 36,654
Referee: Brian Gavin (Offaly)

Tipperary	Waterford

TIPPERARY:
1	Brendan Cummins
2	Paddy Stapleton
3	Paul Curran
4	Michael Cahill
5	John O'Keeffe
6	Conor O'Mahony
7	Pádraic Maher
8	Gearóid Ryan
9	Shane McGrath
10	Séamus Callanan
11	Noel McGrath
12	Séamus Callanan
13	Eoin Kelly (c)
14	John O'Brien
15	Lar Corbett
Substitutes:
16	Darren Gleeson
17	Pa Bourke
18	Shane Bourke
19	Benny Dunne
20	Stephen Lillis
21	Brendan Maher
22	Paddy Murphy
23	Brian O'Meara
24	Paddy Stapleton
25	James Woodlock
26	David Young
Manager:
Declan Ryan

WATERFORD:
1	Clinton Hennessy
2	Darragh Fives
3	Jerome Maher
4	Noel Connors
5	Tony Browne
6	Michael Walsh
7	Kevin Moran
8	Stephen Molumphy (c)
9	Richie Foley
21	Eoin McGrath
11	Shane O'Sullivan
12	Pauric Mahony
13	John Mullane
14	Shane Walsh
15	Brian O'Sullivan
Substitutes:
10	Maurice Shanahan
16	Adrian Power
17
18
19
20
22
23
24
25
26
Manager:
Davy FitzGerald
