= 2009 Munster Senior Hurling Championship final =

- Event: 2009 Munster Senior Hurling Championship
| Tipperary | Waterford |
| 4–14 | 2–16 |
- Date: 12 July 2009
- Venue: Semple Stadium, Thurles
- Man of the Match: John Mullane (Waterford)
- Referee: John Sexton (Cork)
- Attendance: 40,330
- Weather: Dry

The 2009 Munster Senior Hurling Championship final was a hurling match played on 12 July 2009 at Semple Stadium, Thurles, County Tipperary. It was contested by Tipperary and Waterford. Tipperary claimed their third Munster Championship of the decade, beating Waterford on a scoreline of 4–14 to 2–16, a 4-point winning margin. Overall, this was Tipperary's thirty eighth Munster Senior Hurling Championship.

== Previous Munster Final encounters ==
Previous to this encounter, the teams had met each other in six Munster Hurling Finals, with Tipperary edging the rivalry with four wins in comparison to Waterford's two wins. The most recent Munster Final involving both teams was in 2002, with Waterford winning on a scoreline of 2–23 to 3–12. The match was notable for the fact that Waterford won their first Munster Championship in thirty-nine years.

| Date | Venue | Tipperary score | Waterford score | Match report |
|---|---|---|---|---|
| 23 August 1925 | Fraher Field, Dungarvan | 6–06 (24) | 1–02 (5) | |
| 6 July 1958 | Semple Stadium, Thurles | 4–12 (24) | 1–05 (8) | |
| 5 August 1962 | Gaelic Grounds, Limerick | 5–14 (29) | 2–03 (9) | |
| 28 July 1963 | Gaelic Grounds, Limerick | 0–08 (8) | 0–11 (11) | |
| 2 July 1989 | Páirc Uí Chaoimh, Cork | 0–26 (26) | 2–08 (14) | Irish Times |
| 30 June 2002 | Páirc Uí Chaoimh, Cork | 3–12 (21) | 2–23 (29) | Irish Examiner |

== GAA 125th Anniversary ==
Special events were held in Thurles to mark the 125th anniversary of the GAA on the weekend of the match. Most notable of these special events was a torch procession from the birthplace of Michael Cusack, Carran, County Clare to Hayes' Hotel in Thurles (founding place of the GAA). On the day of the match, the torch was brought from Hayes' Hotel to Semple Stadium. The torch was brought onto the pitch by former Tipperary hurler, Jimmy Doyle.

== Team selection ==
Tipperary manager Liam Sheedy named an unchanged team from the semi-final win over Clare for the Munster Senior Hurling Championship final clash with Waterford. For Waterford, Tony Browne came in at wing-back for Richie Foley, Aidan Kearney took Kevin Moran's spot on the other wing. Moran moved to midfield to allow Stephen Molumphy switch to centre forward.

== Match ==
=== Details ===
12 July
Munster Final

| Tipperary | 4–14 - 2–16 | Waterford |
|---|---|---|
| L. Corbett 2–2; E. Kelly 1–3; S. Callanan 1–1; N. McGrath 0–3; P. Kerwick 0–1; C. O'Mahony 0–1; S. McGrath 0–1; J. O'Brien 0–1; B. Dunne 0–1 | (Report) | E. Kelly 1–7; J. Mullane 1–5; S. Molumphy 0–2; D. Shanahan 0–1; R. Foley 0–1 |

Semple Stadium, Thurles
Referee: J. Sexton (Cork)

| Tipperary | Waterford |

TIPPERARY:
| 1 | Brendan Cummins |
| 2 | Paddy Stapleton |
| 3 | Paul Curran | | (substituted off) 35' |
| 4 | Conor O'Brien |
| 5 | Declan Fanning |
| 6 | Conor O'Mahony | (yellow card) |
| 7 | Pádraic Maher |
| 8 | James Woodlock | | (substituted off) 46' |
| 9 | Shane McGrath |
| 10 | Pat Kerwick | | (substituted off) 56' |
| 11 | Séamus Callanan |
| 12 | John O'Brien | | (substituted off) 69' |
| 13 | Noel McGrath |
| 14 | Eoin Kelly | Booked | (substituted off) 35' |
| 15 | Lar Corbett |
Substitutes:
| 16 | Darren Gleeson |
| 17 | Pa Bourke |
| 18 | Éamonn Buckley |
| 19 | Michael Cahill |
| 20 | John Devane |
| 21 | Benny Dunne | | (substituted on) 46' |
| 22 | Seamus Hennessy |
| 23 | Paul Kelly |
| 24 | Brendan Maher | | (substituted on) 35' |
| 25 | Patrick Maher |
| 26 | Hugh Maloney | Booked | (substituted on) 56' |
| 27 | Gearóid Ryan |
| 28 | Willie Ryan (c) | | (substituted on) 35' |
| 29 | Thomas Stapleton |
| 30 | Micheál Webster | | (substituted on) 69' |
Manager:
Liam Sheedy

WATERFORD:
| 1 | Clinton Hennessy |
| 2 | Eoin Murphy |
| 3 | Declan Prendergast |
| 4 | Noel Connors |
| 5 | Tony Browne | (yellow card) |
| 6 | Michael Walsh |
| 7 | Aidan Kearney |
| 8 | Kevin Moran | | (substituted off) 45' |
| 9 | Shane O'Sullivan |
| 10 | Seamus Prendergast | | (substituted off) 55' |
| 11 | Stephen Molumphy (c) |
| 12 | Jamie Nagle | | (substituted off) 45' |
| 13 | John Mullane |
| 14 | Eoin Kelly |
| 15 | Jack Kennedy | | (substituted off) 27' |
Substitutes:
| 16 | Adrian Power |
| 17 | Richie Foley | | (substituted on) 45' |
| 18 | Dan Shanahan | | (substituted on) 27' |
| 19 | Eoin McGrath | | (substituted on) 45' |
| 20 | Maurice Shanahan | | (substituted on) 55' |
| 21 | Jerome Maher |
| 22 | James Murray |
| 23 | Shane Walsh |
| 24 | Shane Casey |
| 25 | Thomas Ryan |
| 26 | Mark O'Brien |
| 27 | John Hurney |
| 28 | Thomas Connors |
| 29 | Shane Fives |
| 30 | Bryan Phelan |
Manager:
Davy FitzGerald

Man of the Match:
John Mullane

Linesmen:
Barry Kelly (Westmeath)
Anthony Stapleton (Laois)

Sideline Official
David Hughes (Carlow)

Umpires
Michael Copps
John Wall
Richard Troy
Michael O'Kelly

== Post-match reaction ==
Waterford manager Davy FitzGerald was unhappy with his teams defending before half time, "the goal before half-time, and the one after, were bad errors, mistakes we made, But fair play to Tipp, they were in control of the game for a lot of it. Tipp have been coming a long time. And they'll be hard beaten. Their work ethic is very good. You can't make mistakes and expect to win" he said.

Tipperary manager Liam Sheedy conceded that Waterford outhurled Tipperary for much of the Final, "We're down to the last four and we're delighted to be there, We have to be fair and honest, Waterford outhurled us for long patches and we were tipping the odd point here and there, Overall, we came here to win, we've won and we're delighted to be back in Croke Park" he said. Midfielder Shane McGrath claimed that Tipperary were a more rounded team than in 2008, "I think we're more of a team this year than last year - we train a lot harder, we've put in a lot more. We're a closer team, You don't win anything unless you're a close team and friends. At the end of the day, we're all friends and we'll all plug away for each other" he said.
