= 2011 All-Ireland Senior Hurling Championship final =

2011 All-Ireland Senior Hurling Final
- Event: 2011 All-Ireland Senior Hurling Championship
Kilkenny	Tipperary
2–17	1–16
- Date: 4 September 2011
- Venue: Croke Park, Dublin
- Man of the Match: J. J. Delaney
- Referee: Brian Gavin (Offaly)
- Attendance: 81,214
- Weather: Rain clearing to sun 16 °C (61 °F)

The 2011 All-Ireland Senior Hurling Championship Final took place in Croke Park, Dublin on Sunday, 4 September 2011. The final was contested by Kilkenny and defending champions, Tipperary. Kilkenny were playing in their sixth consecutive final, while the pairing of Kilkenny and Tipperary was the first ever time that the same two teams have played in the All-Ireland Senior Hurling Championship Final for three consecutive seasons. Kilkenny won their fifth title in six years after a four-point win against Tipperary, avenging their 2010 defeat. The final which was shown live in Ireland on RTÉ2 attracted the second highest ever viewership for an All Ireland Hurling Final, peaking at 1.1 million viewers in the final minutes. An average audience of 971,000 viewers tuned into the game overall.

== Pre-match ==
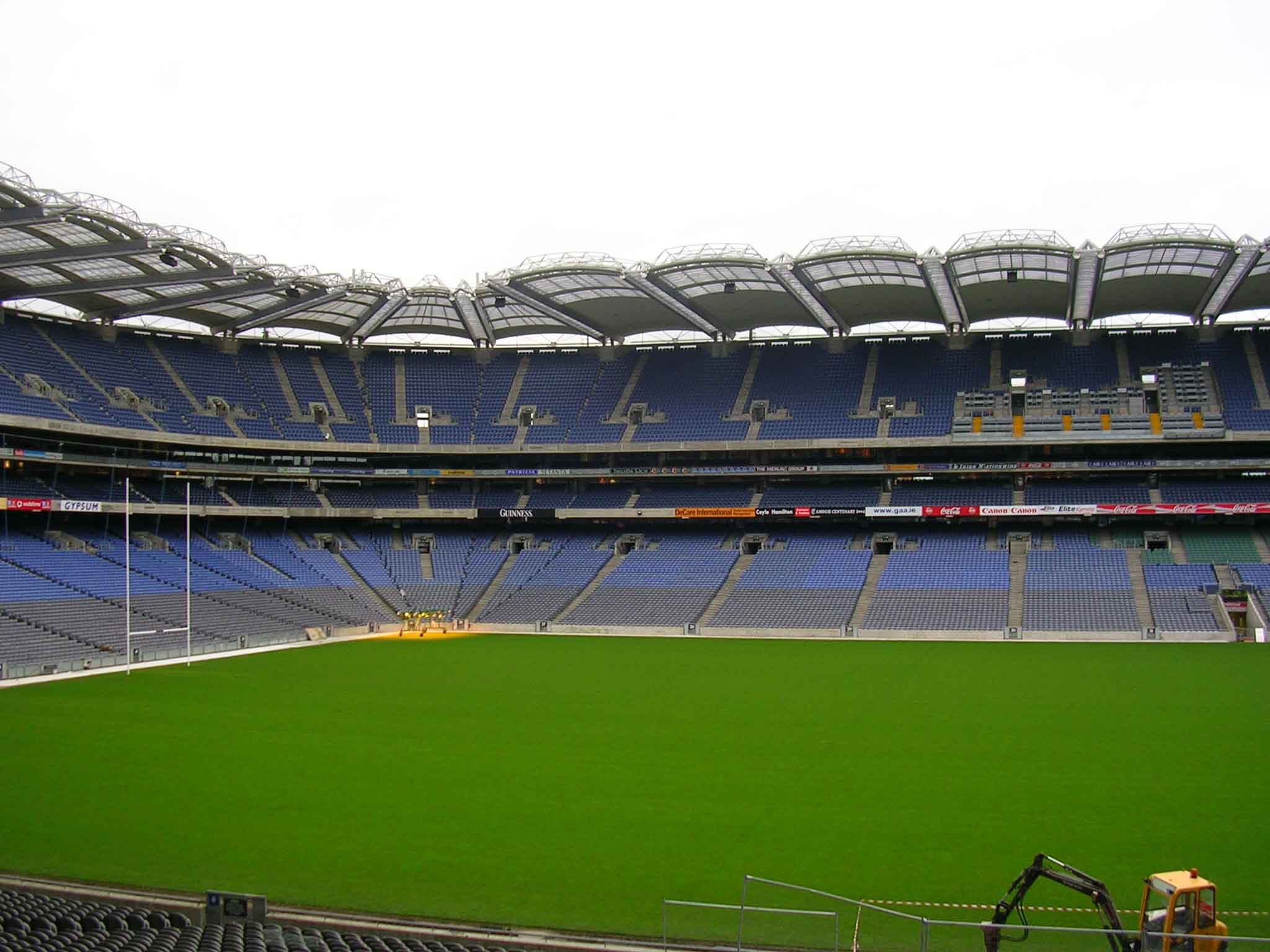
Croke Park, the venue for the 2011 final

=== Background ===
Kilkenny were Leinster champions, having beaten Wexford by 1–26 to 1–15 and Dublin by 4–17 to 1–15 in the final to earn that title. They then beat Waterford in the semi-final on 7 August by 2–19 to 1–16 to reach the final. Tipperary opened their campaign as defending champion's against Cork in the first round on 29 May and won by a scoreline of 3–22 to 0–23. They then defeated Clare by 4–19 o 1–19 to set up a Munster Final meeting with Waterford. Tipperary defeated Waterford by 7–19 to 0–19 to win their third Munster title in four years. Dublin were then defeated by 1–19 to 0–18 to set up a third consecutive All Ireland final against Kilkenny.

Match tickets for the final in all of the three Stands increased from €70 to €80 and all Terrace tickets increased by €5 to €40 from the 2010 final prices.

The pre-match betting made Tipperary slight favourites, with Bookmaker Paddy Power giving odds of 8/11 on a Tipperary win, Kilkenny were 6/4 to win with a draw at 11/1.

Prior to the senior final, Galway claimed the 2011 Minor Hurling Championship after a 1–21 to 1–12 win against Dublin.

=== Team news ===
Tipperary manager Declan Ryan named an unchanged team from the team that defeated Dublin in the semi-final for the final. In a positional change, Séamus Callanan started at left half forward with Noel McGrath at centre half forward.

Kilkenny's Colin Fennelly was a major doubt for the final after picking up a hamstring injury in a club match. However, he recovered sufficiently to be named in the starting team. The Kilkenny team had one change from the team that had beaten Waterford in the semi-final. Eddie Brennan was included, replacing TJ Reid at right half forward.

=== Referee ===
Offaly-based referee Brian Gavin was named as the referee for the 2011 All-Ireland final on 16 August. The Clara native took charge of his first final after previously taken charge of the All-Ireland championship final at minor level in 2004 and at under-21 level in 2006. Barry Kelly of Westmeath was the standby referee, the other linesman was John Sexton of Cork and the sideline official was Galway's Alan Kelly.

== Match summary ==
=== First half ===
Kilkenny started strongly, scoring the first 5 points on the match, with a free from Henry Shefflin, and points from Eoin Larkin, Richie Hogan, Richie Power and Henry Shefflin, all from play. It wasn't until the 16th minute that Tipperary scored their first point, by Noel McGrath. Two minutes later, Eoin Kelly scored a free to make the score 0–5 to 0–2. In the 19th minute, a melee broke out, leading to the referee, Brian Gavin sustaining a cut on the nose, which had connected with Tommy Walsh's hurl. There was a significant delay while the referee was treated. Eoin Kelly then got a point from another free and a minute later, Eddie Brennan scored a point. In the 29th minute, Tipperary made their first substitution, bring on Brendan Maher in place of John O'Keeffe in an effort to strengthen their defence. Two minutes later, Patrick Maher won a free, which was pointed by Eoin Kelly. Shefflin then scored a free from close to the sideline. In the 35th minute, Michael Fennelly broke through the defence to fire the ball low and past Brendan Cummins in the Tipperary goal to score the first goal of the game. Due to the referee's injury earlier in the half, there were to be 5 minutes of additional time to be played. The teams swapped points courtesy of Gearóid Ryan and Michael Rice. Tipperary then won a free as Patrick Maher was fouled by Noel Hickey in front of goal, and Eoin Kelly scored to leave the half time score as Kilkenny 1-08 – 0-06 Tipperary.

=== Second half ===
Tipperary made two changes at half time, bring on Pa Bourke and Benny Dunne, and taking off Shane McGrath and Séamus Callanan. Two minutes in, the ball fell to Pa Bourke in front of goal, who shot wide. Benny Dunne and Henry Shefflin then exchanged points. In the 41st minute, Patrick Maher appeared through on goal, when JJ Delaney got in a flick to put the ball out over the endline for a 65. Eoin Kelly put this over the bar for his 5th point of the game. Colin Fennelly and Richie Power then pointed for Kilkenny to give them a 6-point lead. Conor O'Mahony and Eoin Kelly then scored for Tipperary. In the 49th minute, Eddie Brennan burst through on goal and laid the ball off to Richie Hogan, who put the ball past Cummins for the second time. The score was now 2–12 to 0–10. Shefflin and Noel McGrath then exchanged points, before Lar Corbett fed the ball to Pa Bourke, who put it past David Herity, for Tipperary's first goal. In the 59th minute, Colin Fennelly scored from a sideline cut, and Kilkenny made their first substitution, taking Eddie Brennan off and replacing him with T. J. Reid. Noel McGrath then pointed from 50 metres and Eoin Kelly added another free, leaving the score 2–14 – 1–14 with six minutes left. Shefflin and Kelly swapped frees, maintaining the gap at three points with two minutes left. T. J. Reid then scored going into injury time, and Gearóid Ryan brought the gap back to three a minute later. Eoin Larkin scored the final point of the game a minute later to ensure that Kilkenny won the game 2–17 to 1–16.

== Match details ==
4 September 2011
15:30 IST

Kilkenny	2–17 – 1–16	Tipperary
H Shefflin (0–7, 5f); R Hogan (1–1); M Fennelly (1–0); R Power (0–2); C Fennelly (0–2); E Larkin (0–2); M Rice (0–1); E Brennan (0–1); TJ Reid (0–1)	Report	E Kelly (0–8, 7f, 1 '65); P Bourke (1–0); N McGrath (0–3, 1 sideline); G Ryan (0–2); C O'Mahony (0–1); J O'Brien (0–1); B Dunne (0–1)

Croke Park, Dublin
Attendance: 81,214
Referee: B. Gavin (Offaly)

Kilkenny	Tipperary

KILKENNY:
1	David Herity
2	Jackie Tyrrell
3	Noel Hickey
4	Paul Murphy
5	Tommy Walsh
6	Brian Hogan (captain)
7	J. J. Delaney
8	Michael Fennelly
9	Michael Rice
10	Eddie Brennan	(substituted off) 60'
11	Richie Power
12	Henry Shefflin
13	Colin Fennelly
14	Eoin Larkin
15	Richie Hogan	(substituted off) 65'
Substitutes:
	T. J. Reid	(substituted on) 60'
	John Mulhall	(substituted on) 65'
Manager:
Brian Cody

TIPPERARY:
1	Brendan Cummins
2	Paddy Stapleton
3	Paul Curran
4	Michael Cahill
5	John O'Keeffe	(substituted off) 29'
6	Conor O'Mahony	(substituted off) 57'
7	Pádraic Maher
8	Gearóid Ryan
9	Shane McGrath	(substituted off) 35'
10	Séamus Callanan	(substituted off) 35'
11	Noel McGrath
12	Patrick Maher
13	Eoin Kelly (captain)
14	John O'Brien	(substituted off) 66'
15	Lar Corbett
Substitutes:
	Brendan Maher	(substituted on) 29'
	Benny Dunne	(substituted on) 35'
	Pa Bourke	(substituted on) 35'
	David Young	(substituted on) 57'	(yellow card) 66'
	John O'Neill	(substituted on) 66'
Manager:
Declan Ryan

Man of the Match:
JJ Delaney

Linesmen:
Barry Kelly (Westmeath)
John Sexton (Cork)

Sideline Official
Alan Kelly (Galway)

Umpires

== Trophy presentation ==
The trophy was presented from the Hogan stand to Kilkenny captain Brian Hogan by GAA president Christy Cooney. After the presentation the Kilkenny team and management went on a lap of honour around the Croke Park pitch.

== Man of the Match ==
Kilkenny's J. J. Delaney was chosen as the man-of-the-match for the final. A panel on The Sunday Game on the night of the final, consisting of Anthony Daly, Michael Duignan and John Henderson, chose Delaney from a shortlist that also included Tommy Walsh and Michael Fennelly. He was presented with his award by the GAA president Christy Cooney at the team's victory banquet at the Citywest Hotel in Dublin which was shown live as part of The Sunday Game on RTÉ Two.

== Reaction ==
Kilkenny manager Brian Cody described the win as "massively sweet". Speaking to RTÉ he said that "for the last few years we have been coming in as champions and favourites to win the match, this year was very different, Tipperary were great champions, they set very high standards and they were hot favourites to win today, in those situations it becomes sweet to win because we had to play at a serious level to win it from minute one." Tommy Walsh said that his sixth All-Ireland win was the sweetest of all. Speaking to the Irish Examiner he said "It stands as the sweetest because we lost last year, after last year and losing the five-in-a-row it was heartbreaking all last winter and it probably showed out there today how much it affected us". Tipperary manager Declan Ryan paid tribut to Kilkenny saying "we were lucky to go in only five points down at half-time, Hats off to Kilkenny, they showed they were real champions to come back and play like that today". Former Tipperary manager Nicky English writing in The Irish Times said that "Kilkenny were by far the best team, with team being the operative word, and fully deserved their success, they were the masters in all areas and, from the word go, set out to dominate the physical exchanges just as much as they did in their pomp and in their glory years". Tipperary coach Tommy Dunne speaking the day after the match had praise for Kilkenny saying "They have won eight in 12 years so the statistics speak for themselves, they are a fabulous team and they will rightly go down as one of the greatest teams of all time, if not the greatest, and they showed why they are that again on Sunday". Martin Breheny, writing in the Irish Independent, said that "Brian Cody’s Cats with this victory are poised to surpass Mick O'Dwyer's Kerry football team of the 1970s and 80s as the greatest GAA team in history".

== Civic reception ==
The victorious Kilkenny team arrived back at McDonagh Station in Kilkenny City the day after the final for an open top bus parade to the civic reception at Market Yard. An estimated 30,000 supporters welcomed the team home to Kilkenny for the celebrations.

== Awards ==
Kilkenny had fourteen players nominated for the 2011 GAA-GPA Hurling All-Stars, with David Herity, Paul Murphy and Colin Fennelly being nominated for their first awards, Tipperary received ten nominations. This was the first year of the awards being jointly run by the GAA and Gaelic Players Association In October 2011, Henry Shefflin established a new record when he was awarded his 10th All-Star award and was one of eight Kilkenny players named on the 2011 GAA GPA All Star hurling team. Tipperary received four awards. Kilkenny's Michael Fennelly along with winning an All Star award was also named as the GAA GPA Hurler of the year.
