= Noel Connors =

Irish hurler (born 1990)

Personal information
- Native name: Nollaig Ó Conchubhair (Irish)
- Nickname: Noelie
- Born: 5 May 1990 (age 36) Waterford, Ireland
- Height: 1.73 m (5 ft 8 in)

Sport
- Sport: Hurling
- Position: Left corner-back
Club
- Years: Club
- 2005-present: Passage
Club titles
- Waterford titles: 1
College
- Years: College
- 2008-2018: Waterford Institute of Technology
College titles
- Fitzgibbon titles: 0
Inter-county*
Years	County	Apps (scores)
2009-2019	Waterford	41 (0-00)
Inter-county titles
- Munster titles: 1
- All-Irelands: 0
- NHL: 1
- All Stars: 3
- *Inter County team apps and scores correct as of 19:08, 2 January 2019.

Noel Connors (born 5 May 1990) is an Irish hurler who played for Waterford Senior Championship club Passage and formerly played for and captained the Waterford senior hurling team. He was usually deployed as a corner-back but could also be deployed as a full-back or as a centre-back.

Connors began his hurling career with the Passage club, with whom he won Waterford Championship medals at intermediate level in 2007 and at senior level in 2013. He made his debut for the Waterford senior team in 2009, having previously played for the Waterford minor and under-21 teams. Since then Connors has won National Hurling League and Munster Championship medals, as well as being an All-Ireland Championship runner-up in 2017.

== Early life ==
Connors was born in Waterford and raised in Passage East. His father, Noel Connors Snr, played with the Waterford senior hurling team until an injury ended his career, while his brother, Thomas, has also been a member of the Waterford senior hurling team.

== Playing career ==
=== De La Salle College ===
Connors attended the De La Salle College in Waterford, with whom he played hurling at all grades. On 11 March 2007, he was at left corner-back when the college defeated St. Flannan's College by 2–09 to 0–11 to win the Harty Cup for the first time. Connors retained his place at left corner-back for the subsequent All-Ireland final against Kilkenny CBS on 22 April 2007. A 0–13 to 1–09 victory secured an inaugural All-Ireland title for De La Salle and for Connors.

Connors was eligible for the De La Salle College senior hurling team again the following year, and won a second successive Harty Cup medal on 9 March 2008 after a 1–11 to 0–07 defeat of Thurles CBS. He was singled out as being particularity effective in nullifying the threat of Thurles forward John O'Neill during the game. On 19 April 2008, Connors was at right wing-back when De La Salle College defeated Thurles CBS in a replay to win the All-Ireland Championship for the second year in-a-row.

=== Passage ===
Connors first started hurling at adult level with the Passage club in 2005. He was 15-years-old when he joined the club's intermediate team as a corner-back. On 23 November 2007, he was at left wing-back when Passage defeated Dungarvan by 2–16 to 1–13 to win the Waterford Intermediate Championship.

On 13 October 2013, Connor was at centre-back when Passage defeated Ballygunner by 3–16 to 3–13 in the 2013 Waterford Senior Championship final. It was the club's first ever championship title.

=== Waterford ===
==== Minor and under-21 ====
Connors made his first appearance for the Waterford minor hurling team in a 3–15 to 0-09 Munster Championship quarter-final defeat by Cork. He was eligible for the minor grade once again in 2008, however, Waterford faced a 4–13 to 1–06 defeat by Cork for the second successive year.

Connors subsequently played for three seasons the Waterford under-21 hurling team, however, he ended his tenure in that grade without any silverware.

==== Senior ====
Connors made his senior debut for Waterford on 4 January 2009 in a 1–17 to 2-13 Waterford Crystal Cup defeat of University College Cork. Later that season he played in all six of Waterford's National Hurling League games, before making his first championship start in a 1–08 to 0-11 Munster semi-final draw with Limerick. In spite of being described as one of the worst ever championship games, Connors was described as "effective" and earned an 8/10 rating in the Irish Independent. He lined out for the full 70 minutes at left corner-back in Waterford's subsequent 4–14 to 2–16 defeat by Tipperary in the 2009 Munster final.

On 11 July 2010, Connors lined out at left corner-back when Waterford drew 2-15 apiece with Cork in the 2010 Munster final. He retained his position in defence for the subsequent replay, which saw him claim his first silverware after Waterford won by 1–16 to 1–13.

Connors was at his customary position of left corner-back when Waterford lost the 2011 Munster final to Tipperary by 7–19 to 0–19 on 10 July 2011.

Connors was ruled out of Waterford's opening game of the 2012 National League due to a hamstring injury. It was later revealed that he was suffering from a bulging disc in his back which ruled him out of the entire league campaign. Connor's return to action in the championship was further hampered by a possible groin injury. On 15 July, he lined out in defence in the 2012 Munster final defeat by Tipperary.

On 3 May 2015, Connors was named at left corner-back but lined out at right corner-back where he marked Cork's Patrick Horgan in the 2015 National League final. The 1–24 to 0–17 victory gave him a National League medal. On 12 July 2015, Connors played the full 70 minutes when Waterford were beaten for the fourth time in six seasons by Tipperary in the 2015 Munster final. He ended the season by winning a second GAA/GPA All-Star award.

On 1 May 2016, Connors was at left corner-back when Waterford drew 0-22 apiece with Clare in the 2016 National League final. He was switched to the full-back position for the replay, which Waterford lost by 1–23 to 2–19. On 10 July, Connors was substituted in the 58th minute of the 2016 Munster final, with Waterford eventually losing by 5–19 to 0–13.

On 3 September 2017, Connors lined out opposite Galway's Conor Whelan in his usual position of left corner-back in the 2017 All-Ireland final. Waterford eventually lost the final by 0–26 to 2–17. Connors ended the season by winning a third GAA/GPA All-Star award.

On 2 January 2019, Connors was appointed captain of the Waterford senior hurling team.

On 13 October 2019, Connors was dropped from the panel entirely.

== Career statistics ==
As of match played 17 June 2018.

Team	Year	National League			Munster		All-Ireland		Total	
Team	Year	Division	Apps	Score	Apps	Score	Apps	Score	Apps	Score
Waterford	2009	Division 1	6	0-00	3	0-00	2	0-00	11	0-00
Waterford	2010	Division 1	6	0-00	3	0-00	1	0-00	10	0-00
Waterford	2011	Division 1	5	0-00	2	0-00	2	0-00	9	0-00
Waterford	2012	Division 1A	0	0-00	2	0-00	1	0-00	3	0-00
Waterford	2013	Division 1A	1	0-00	1	0-00	3	0-00	5	0-00
Waterford	2014	Division 1A	6	0-00	2	0-00	1	0-00	9	0-00
Waterford	2015	Division 1B	8	0-00	2	0-00	2	0-00	12	0-00
Waterford	2016	Division 1A	6	0-00	2	0-00	3	0-00	11	0-00
Waterford	2017	Division 1A	5	0-00	1	0-00	5	0-00	11	0-00
Waterford	2018	Division 1A	3	0-00	3	0-00	—		6	0-00
Total			46	0-00	21	0-00	20	0-00	87	0-00

== Honours ==
De La Salle College

- Dr. Croke Cup (2): 2007, 2008
- Dr. Harty Cup (2): 2007, 2008

Passage

- Waterford Senior Hurling Championship (1): 2013
- Waterford Intermediate Hurling Championship (1): 2007

Waterford

- Munster Senior Hurling Championship (1): 2010
- National Hurling League (1): 2015

Individual

- GAA GPA All Stars Awards (3): 2010, 2015, 2017

Sporting positions
Preceded by Kevin Moran	Waterford Senior Hurling Captain; 2019	Succeeded by Pauric Mahony
