= Patrick Maher (hurler) =

Irish hurler (born 1989)

Personal information
- Native name: Pádraig Ó Meachair (Irish)
- Nickname: Bonner
- Born: 12 October 1989 (age 37) Ballinasloe, County Galway, Ireland
- Occupation: Army Private
- Height: 1.78 m (5 ft 10 in)

Sport
- Sport: Hurling
- Position: Centre-forward
Club
- Years: Club
- 2007-present: Lorrha–Dorrha
Club titles
- Tipperary titles: 0
College
- Years: College
- Dublin Institute of Technology
College titles
- Fitzgibbon titles: 0
Inter-county*
Years	County	Apps (scores)
2009-2024	Tipperary	45 (7-26)
Inter-county titles
- Munster titles: 5
- All-Irelands: 3
- NHL: 0
- All Stars: 2
- *Inter County team apps and scores correct as of match played 22 May 2022.

Patrick "Bonner" Maher (born 12 October 1989) is an Irish hurler. He was part of the Tipperary senior team from 2009 until retiring in 2024.

Maher joined the team straight out of the minor grade during the 2009 championship, however, he didn't become a regular member of the starting fifteen until the following year. Since then he has won three All-Ireland winners' medals (2010, 2016, & 2019) and five Munster winners' medals (2009, 2011, 2012, 2015 & 2016). He has ended up as an All-Ireland runner-up on three occasions (2009, 2011 & 2014). Maher also picked up his first and All-Star for his role in getting Tipperary to the All-Ireland final in 2014 and in 2016 won a second.

== Army career ==
Maher was a 3 Star Private in the Irish Army from 2012 to 2022. He survived overseas with the UN in Syria and Golan Heights.

== Playing career ==
=== Club ===
At club level Maher is a one-time county intermediate championship medallist with Lorrha–Dorrha. The men from Lower Ormond defeated Moycarkey–Borris from Mid Tipperary in the 2007 County Final on a scoreline of 1–11 to 0–11. Lorrha defeated Ballina in the North Tipperary final en route to the County final that year on a scoreline of 3–9 to 1–13. Maher - who was still only a minor that year - scored a late goal which put Lorrha in a winning position.

=== Minor and under-21 ===
Maher first came to prominence on the inter-county scene as a member of the Tipperary minor team in 2007. He won a Munster medal in this grade that year following an 0–18 to 1–11 defeat of Cork. Tipp subsequently defeated Kilkenny to qualify for the All-Ireland final. Cork, the defeated Munster finalists, provided the opposition and a high-scoring game developed over the course of the hour. At the full-time whistle Tipp were the champions by 3–14 to 2-11 and Maher added an All-Ireland medal to his collection.

Maher subsequently graduated onto the Tipperary under-21 hurling team. In 2010 Tipp defeated Clare in the provincial decider by 1–22 to 1–17, giving Maher his second Munster under-21 winners' medal having previously won one in 2008 at wing half forward . Tipp subsequently qualified for an All-Ireland meeting with Galway, which Tipperary won by 5–21 to 0–11. It was Maher's first All-Ireland under-21 winners' medal.

=== Senior ===
Maher made his Senior inter-county debut for Tipperary against Waterford in the 2009 Waterford Crystal Cup, lining out at left half-forward, and scored a goal against Clare in the 2009 Waterford Crystal Cup Final. He made his debut in the National Hurling League in February 2009, lining out at centre-forward against Waterford and scoring a point in a 2–13 to 1–12 Tipperary victory. Maher went on to make his Championship debut at left half-forward on 3 July 2010 against Wexford in the 2010 All-Ireland Senior Hurling Championship Qualifiers, scoring two points from play.

On 5 September 2010, Maher started at left half-forward as Tipperary won their 26th All Ireland title, beating reigning champions Killkenny by 4–17 to 1–18 in the final, preventing Kilkenny from achieving an historic 5-in-a-row, it was Maher's first All-Ireland winners medal. Six day's later on 11 September 2010, Tipperary clinched the All Ireland Under-21 title by defeating Galway by 5–22 to 0–12 at Semple Stadium, with Maher starting at centre half forward and scoring a goal in the second half. Patrick was nominated for an All-star award in 2010, 2011 and 2012. GAA/GPA player of the month for June 2012. Munster senior hurling Player of the Year 2012. In 2013 Maher joined the Irish army.

In October 2014, Maher won his first All Stars Award after a successful 2014 campaign where Tipperary reached the All-Ireland Final.

On 4 September 2016, Maher won his second All-Ireland Senior hurling title when Tipperary defeated Kilkenny in the final by 2–29 to 2-20.

In October 2016, Maher left Ireland for six months army service in a peacekeeping mission to the Golan Heights in Syria.

On 16 June 2019, Maher was stretchered off in first-half injury-time after appearing to twist his knee in an awkward fall in Tipperary's 1–22 to 0–21 defeat of Limerick. A scan subsequently revealed that he had ruptured the anterior cruciate ligament in his right knee, an injury which ended his season.

On 22 May 2021, it was announced that Maher would miss the remainder of the 2021 season after suffering an Achilles injury in training on the previous Thursday which required surgery.

On 7 October 2024, Maher announced his retirement from inter-county hurling.

== Career statistics ==
As of match played 22 May 2022

Team	Year	National League			Munster		All-Ireland		Total	
Team	Year	Division	Apps	Score	Apps	Score	Apps	Score	Apps	Score
Tipperary-	2009	Division 1	7	1-01	0	0-00	0	0-00	7	1-01
Tipperary-	2010	Division 1	1	0-00	0	0-00	5	0-03	6	0-03
Tipperary-	2011	Division 1	7	0-05	3	1-01	2	0-00	12	1-06
Tipperary-	2012	Division 1A	0	0-00	3	0-00	1	0-00	4	0-00
Tipperary-	2013	Division 1A	4	1-00	1	0-00	1	0-00	6	1-00
Tipperary-	2014	Division 1A	5	3-02	1	1-00	6	2-04	12	6-06
Tipperary-	2015	Division 1A	3	1-00	2	0-05	1	0-01	6	1-06
Tipperary-	2016	Division 1A	3	0-00	3	0-01	2	0-02	8	0-03
Tipperary-	2017	Division 1A	—		0	0-00	4	0-03	4	0-03
Tipperary-	2018	Division 1A	6	1-05	4	1-02	—		10	2-07
Tipperary-	2019	Division 1A	6	1-00	4	1-03	—		10	2-03
Tipperary-	2020	Division 1A	—		—		2	1-00	2	1-00
Tipperary-	2021	Division 1A	2	0-00	—		—		2	0-00
Tipperary-	2022	Division 1A	1	0-00	1	0-01	—		2	0-01
Total			45	8-13	22	4-13	23	3-13	91	15-39

== Honours ==
=== Tipperary ===
- All-Ireland Senior Hurling Championship:
  - Winner (3): 2010, 2016, 2019
  - Runner-up (3): 2009, 2011, 2014
- Munster Senior Hurling Championship:
  - Winner (5): 2009, 2011, 2012, 2015, 2016
  - Runner-up (0):
- National Hurling League:
  - Winner (0):
  - Runner-up (4): 2009, 2013, 2014, 2017
- All-Ireland Under-21 Hurling Championship:
  - Winner (1): 2010
  - Runner-up (1): 2008
- Munster Under-21 Hurling Championship:
  - Winner (2): 2008, 2010
- All-Ireland Minor Hurling Championship:
  - Winner (1): 2007
- Munster Minor Hurling Championship:
  - Winner (1): 2007

Individual

- All Star Award (2): 2014, 2016
