= 2016 Munster Senior Hurling Championship final =

- Event: 2016 Munster Senior Hurling Championship
Tipperary	Waterford
5-19	0-13
- Date: 10 July 2016
- Venue: Gaelic Grounds, Limerick
- Man of the Match: John McGrath
- Referee: Brian Gavin (Offaly)
- Attendance: 26,508
- Weather: Wind and rain

The 2016 Munster Senior Hurling Championship final was a hurling match that was played on 10 July 2016 at the Gaelic Grounds, Limerick. The winners would advance to the semi-finals of the All-Ireland Senior Hurling Championship, with the loser going into the All-Ireland quarter-finals.

Tipperary and Waterford contested the final.

Tipperary won the game on a 5-19 to 0-13 scoreline to claim their 42nd Munster title, the 21-point margin was identical to the difference between Tipperary and Waterford in the 2011 Munster final.

John McGrath scored 3-2 in the match for Tipperary and was named as the man of the match.

== Previous Munster Final encounters ==
Date	Venue	Tipperary score	Waterford score	Match report
23 August 1925	Fraher Field, Dungarvan	6-06 (24)	1-02 (5)	
6 July 1958	Semple Stadium, Thurles	4-12 (24)	1-05 (8)	
5 August 1962	Gaelic Grounds, Limerick	5-14 (29)	2-03 (9)	
28 July 1963	Gaelic Grounds, Limerick	0-08 (8)	0-11 (11)	
2 July 1989	Páirc Uí Chaoimh, Cork	0-26 (26)	2-08 (14)	Irish Times
30 June 2002	Páirc Uí Chaoimh, Cork	3-12 (21)	2-23 (29)	Irish Examiner
12 July 2009	Semple Stadium, Thurles	4-14 (26)	2-16 (22)	RTE Sport
10 July 2011	Páirc Uí Chaoimh, Cork	7-19 (40)	0-19 (19)	Irish Independent
15 July 2012	Páirc Uí Chaoimh, Cork	2-17 (23)	0-16 (16)	Irish Examiner
12 July 2015	Semple Stadium, Thurles	0-20 (20)	0-16 (16)	Irish Examiner

== Route to the final ==
=== Tipperary ===
22 May 2016
16:00
Quarter-final

Tipperary	0-22 - 0-13	Cork
S Callanan 0-8 (4f), J O’Dwyer 0-7 (2f, 1 65), N McGrath 0-2, Pádraic Maher, B Maher, J McGrath, J Forde & K Bergin 0-1 each.	Report	P Horgan 0-4f, A Cadogan 0-3, C Lehane 0-2 (1f), C Murphy, B Lawton, S Harnedy & L O’Farrell 0-1 each.

Semple Stadium, Thurles
Attendance: 29,114
Referee: B Kelly (Westmeath)
19 June 2016
16:00
Semi-final

Tipperary	3-12 - 1-16	Limerick
S Callanan (1-6, 0-3 frees, 0-2 65s); M Breen (2-1); N McGrath (0-3); J McGrath, Pádraic Maher (0-1 each).	Report	S Dowling (0-9, 8 frees); T Morrissey (1-0); D Hannon (0-2); B Nash, C Lynch, G Hegarty, J Ryan, J Fitzgibbon (0-1 each).

Semple Stadium, Thurles
Attendance: 25,531
Referee: J McGrath (Westmeath)

=== Waterford ===
5 June 2016
16:00
Semi-final

Clare	0-17 - 1-21	Waterford
C McGrath, C O’Connell (0-3, 2 frees each); P Collins, C Ryan (1 65’) (0-2 each); C Cleary, C Galvin, T Kelly, J Conlon, B Bugler, D Fitzgerald, D Reidy (0-1 each).	Report	Pauric Mahony (5 frees), A Gleeson (1 sideline) (0-6 each); M Shanahan (1-2); K Moran (0-3); D Fives, Shane Bennett, Philip Mahony, J Dillon (0-1 each).

Semple Stadium, Thurles
Attendance: 19,715
Referee: J Owens (Wexford)

== Build-up ==
This was the 11th Munster final meeting between the counties, with Tipperary leading 8-2. The winners would qualify for the All-Ireland semi-final on 14 August, while the losers would meet a qualifier winner in the All-Ireland quarter-final on 24 July. It was announced on 20 June that the final would be played at the Gaelic Grounds in Limerick. Traditionally Tipperary and Waterford Munster finals have taken place in Pairc Ui Chaoimh, but the stadium is currently closed for reconstruction.

Ticket prices for the final ranged from €30 to €35 in the stand and €25 in the terrace.

The match was shown live on RTÉ One as part of The Sunday Game Live, with commentary from Ger Canning and Michael Duignan.

Tipperary went into the match without the suspended John O'Dwyer who received a straight red card in the semi-final win against Limerick. They made one change to the starting team with Niall O'Meara coming in to replace John O'Dwyer. Waterford named the same team that defeated Clare in the Munster semi-final.

In the Minor final which was played before the senior final, Tipperary defeated Limerick 1-24 to 0-10.

== Match ==
=== Details ===
10 July 2016
Final
16:00

Tipperary	5-19 - 0-13	Waterford
S. Callanan (1-11, 8 frees, 1 65); J. McGrath (3-2, 1-0 pen); M. Breen (1-1); Pádraic Maher, N. McGrath, Patrick Maher, J. Forde, A. McCormack (0-1 each)	Report	Pauric Mahony (0-6, 4 frees); P. Curran (0-5, 3 frees); A. Gleeson (0-2, sidelines)

Gaelic Grounds
Attendance: 26,508
Referee: Brian Gavin (Offaly)

Tipperary	Waterford

== Reaction ==
Waterford manager Derek McGrath speaking after the game said "The first thing I have to look at is myself. It's my job to have the team prepared in a manner that they will be able to produce a performance that was a lot better than that. It's highly embarrassing and we're very demoralised after it, any analysis of us is probably balanced by how good Tipperary were at times. I thought we started the game reasonably well, Ironically, we went fairly conventional at the start and seemed to be getting a bit of a foothold into it. We pushed on with 25 minutes to go and the floodgates opened, It's very, very disappointing I have to say."

Man of the Match John McGrath speaking to The Sunday Game said "When I was getting up this morning I wasn't envisaging anything like that, despite the scoreline it was still a massively, massively tough game. We just stuck to our task, we just worked really hard, the breaks go for you some days and when you work I think they fall for you that bit more. We just had a huge work-rate and, thankfully, things paid off in the end."

Cyril Farrell, writing in the Irish Independent, was impressed by the Tipperary performance, saying "it was just like watching Cats in their pomp, If the jerseys were changed at half-time you would have been forgiven for thinking it was Kilkenny out there for the second 35 minutes. There was a ruthlessness to Michael Ryan's men that I haven't see for a while and who took any sniff of a chance they got and kept burying nails in the Waterford coffin until the final whistle."

John Mullane, also writing in the Irish Independent, was disappointed in the performance of the Waterford team, saying "I needn't tell you that I didn't see that one coming. I'm absolutely gutted for the Waterford management and players. It would be easy for me to be critical and stick the boot in but I've been in that position before and it's a lonely place. Waterford have been a breath of fresh air over the last 12 months but they didn't turn up yesterday. Never mind talk of the sweeper system; the work-rate required to win a Munster final simply wasn't there."
