= 2015 Munster Senior Hurling Championship final =

- Event: 2015 Munster Senior Hurling Championship
Tipperary	Waterford
0-21	0-16
- Date: 12 July 2015
- Venue: Semple Stadium, Thurles
- Man of the Match: Brendan Maher
- Referee: James Owens (Wexford)
- Attendance: 43,084
- Weather: Dry

The 2015 Munster Senior Hurling Championship final was a hurling match which was played on 12 July 2015 at Semple Stadium, Thurles. The winners would advance to the semi-finals of the All-Ireland Senior Hurling Championship, with the loser going into the All-Ireland quarter-finals. Tipperary and Waterford contested the final, with Tipperary winning the title on a 0-21 to 0-16 scoreline. The win was Tipperary's 41st Munster Senior title and first since 2012.

== Previous Munster Final encounters ==
Date	Venue	Tipperary score	Waterford score	Match report
23 August 1925	Fraher Field, Dungarvan	6-06 (24)	1-02 (5)	
6 July 1958	Semple Stadium, Thurles	4-12 (24)	1-05 (8)	
5 August 1962	Gaelic Grounds, Limerick	5-14 (29)	2-03 (9)	
28 July 1963	Gaelic Grounds, Limerick	0-08 (8)	0-11 (11)	
2 July 1989	Páirc Uí Chaoimh, Cork	0-26 (26)	2-08 (14)	Irish Times
30 June 2002	Páirc Uí Chaoimh, Cork	3-12 (21)	2-23 (29)	Irish Examiner
12 July 2009	Semple Stadium, Thurles	4-14 (26)	2-16 (22)	RTE Sport
10 July 2011	Páirc Uí Chaoimh, Cork	7-19 (40)	0-19 (19)	Irish Independent
15 July 2012	Páirc Uí Chaoimh, Cork	2-17 (23)	0-16 (16)	Irish Examiner

== Route to the final ==
=== Tipperary ===
21 June 2015; 16:00; Semi-final	Limerick	1-16 - 4-23	Tipperary	Gaelic Grounds; Attendance: 31,488; Referee: B Gavin (Offaly)
21 June 2015; 16:00; Semi-final	S Dowling (1-7), D Hannon (0-3), D Breen (0-1), G O'Mahony (0-1), G Mulcahy (0-2), S O'Brien (0-1), D O'Grady (0-1).	Report	S Callanan (2-5), J O'Dwyer (0-7), J Forde (1-3), M Breen (1-0), P Maher (0-3), S McGrath (0-2), N O'Meara (0-1), J Woodlock (0-1), S Bourke (0-1).	Gaelic Grounds; Attendance: 31,488; Referee: B Gavin (Offaly)

=== Waterford ===
7 June 2015; 16:00; Semi-final	Cork	1-21 - 3-19	Waterford	Semple Stadium; Attendance: 21,047; Referee: B Kelly (Westmeath)
7 June 2015; 16:00; Semi-final	P Horgan (1-7, goal and six points frees), P Cronin (0-5), A Cadogan (0-2), D McCarthy (0-1, one 65), A Walsh (0-1), L O’Farrell (0-1), D Kearney (0-1), M Ellis (0-1), C Lehane (0-1), B Cooper (0-1).	Report	M Shanahan (1-9, seven frees, one 65), T Devine (1-0), J Dillon (1-0), K Moran (0-2), Stephen Bennett (0-2), Shane Bennett (0-2), A Gleeson (0-1, free), T de Búrca (0-1), C Dunford (0-1), P Curran (0-1).	Semple Stadium; Attendance: 21,047; Referee: B Kelly (Westmeath)

== Build-up ==
On 23 June, Waterford and Tipperary struck a deal to stage the final at Semple Stadium in Thurles as the regular venue for this fixture, Páirc Uí Chaoimh, was out of commission due to redevelopment work. Ticket prices for the final ranged from €30 to €35 in the stand and €25 in the terrace, with Tipperary allocated the Killinan End terrace and Waterford the Town End Terrace.

The match was shown live on RTÉ Two as part of The Sunday Game Live, with commentary from Marty Morrissey and Michael Duignan.

In the Minor final which was played before the senior final, Tipperary defeated Limerick 0-20 to 0-17.

== Team selection ==
Waterford made one change to the side that defeated Cork in the semi-final, with Tom Devine making first championship start. Tipperary made two changes to the team that defeated Limerick, with Michael Breen making his full championship debut at right half-back, and the fit again Cathal Barrett taking over from injured Paddy Stapleton at right corner back. Conor O’Brien was replaced by Ronan Maher in the full back line.

== Match ==
=== Summary ===
Tipperary got the opening point with a strike from Niall O'Meara with Colin Dunford getting Waterford's first score to make it two points to one after 5 minutes. Tipperary opened up a four-point lead after 12 minutes on a six points to two scoreline and had a 0-10 to 0-9 lead at half time, helped by four Seamus Callanan points. Jason Forde got the opening score of the second half to push Tipperary's lead to two points. Maurice Shanahan got the equalizing score for Waterford in the 43rd minute to make the score 0-11 each. John O'Dwyer got his third point in the 58th minute to open up a three-point lead for Tipperary. Lar Corbett then increased the lead to four with a long range shot. Seamus Callanan scored another point from a 65 to increase the lead back to four after Maurice Shanahan had got one back for Waterford. Two more points from Tipperary increased the lead to five points before both teams traded points to leave the final score 0-21 to Tipperary, 0-16 to Waterford.

=== Details ===
12 July 2015
Final

Tipperary	0-21 - 0-16	Waterford
Séamus Callanan 0-6 (0-4f, 0-2 65), John O'Dwyer 0-5 (0-2f), Niall O'Meara 0-3, Jason Forde 0-2, Patrick Maher 0-2, Michael Breen 0-1, Lar Corbett 0-1, Shane Bourke 0-1	Report	Maurice Shanahan 0-8 (0-3f, 0-2 65), Kevin Moran 0-2, Austin Gleeson 0-2, Shane Fives 0-2, Patrick Curran 0-1, Colin Dunford 0-1

Semple Stadium, Thurles
Attendance: 43,084
Referee: James Owens (Wexford)

Tipperary	Waterford

== Reaction ==
Waterford manager Derek McGrath, speaking after the game, said "I think the first 10 or 15 minutes Tipp looked a bit more fluid than us. I thought we got a grip in the middle part of the first half and we seemed to be able to grind it out. This much vaunted 'system' seemed to be up and running and we were disappointed to go in a point down. But I could have no real qualms overall. I thought Tipp were a slightly better team than us.”

Tipperary manager Eamon O'Shea, who picked up his first major trophy, said "“I thought we started well, we tried to keep the ball open. In the second-half I thought we did better, we moved the ball. We got a few breaks at various times and managed to get the points.”“I don't always feel the silverware is as important as the outside thinks, but it is important. I thought it important we stayed at the game - they're a resilient bunch, they've been through a fair bit. “We had nine Munster final debutants, sometimes people think we've been going since the year 2000. We had nine people who played their first Munster final there - I think that's good, to have that transition.“I thought a five-point win - maybe those who watch the game don't call it a close game, but for me it was as close as it gets. I didn't relax until the last minute of play. “We've been through close games and sometimes we've come out the wrong side of them, but you have to be careful judging a team who come out the wrong side of a game by a point or two. I was always happy the team would be capable of winning a really tight match, and today was a really tight match.”

Former Waterford player, John Mullane, writing in the Irish Independent, felt it was an important win for Tipperary, saying "For Tipperary, this was an important landmark under Eamon O'Shea, the first piece of silverware they have collected in his third and final season in charge. What will have pleased him most was Tipp's ability to come through a battle because those question marks remained after losing the 2013 and 2014 National League finals, and last year's All-Ireland decider."

Former Tipperary player, Nicky English, writing in The Irish Times, thought that both teams could take something from the game, saying "Both Tipperary and Waterford can take something from this but, importantly, they have room to improve before the All-Ireland series and will need to, as this wasn’t a great match. A few weeks ago the consensus was that Kilkenny and Tipperary were decisively ahead of the chasing pack. But now, although they’ve won their provincial titles, I think they've both shown vulnerabilities in their game which will encourage the other four teams still in the championship."

On The Sunday Game on the night of the match, Tipperary captain Brendan Maher was named as the man of the match by a panel consisting of Donal Óg Cusack and Eddie Brennan. The other nominees were Tipperary's Cathal Barrett and Waterford’s Maurice Shanahan.
