= Paddy Murphy (hurler) =

Irish hurler

Personal information
- Native name: Pádriag Ó Murchú (Irish)
- Born: 26 March 1990 (age 36) Nenagh, Ireland
- Height: 1.85 m (6 ft 1 in)

Sport
- Sport: Hurling
- Position: Full Forward
Club
- Years: Club
- 2007–: Nenagh Éire Óg
Inter-county
- Years: County
- 2011-2014: Tipperary
Inter-county titles
- Munster titles: 1

Paddy Murphy is an Irish sportsperson. He plays hurling with his local club Nenagh Éire Óg and with the Tipperary senior inter-county team.

== Career ==
He played in the All-Ireland Under-21 Hurling Championship for Tipperary from 2009 until 2011, winning the Championship in 2010. He was named in the Tipperary squad for the 2014 National Hurling League.

== Honours ==
Tipperary

- All-Ireland Under-21 Hurling Championship (1): 2010
- Munster Under-21 Hurling Championship (1): 2010
- All-Ireland Minor Hurling Championship (1): 2007
- Munster Minor Hurling Championship (1): 2007
- Waterford Crystal Cup (1): 2014
