= Brendan Maher =

Tipperary hurler (born 1989)

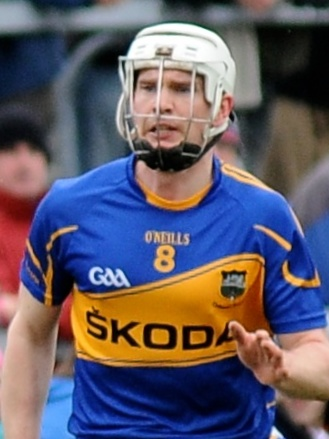

Personal information
- Native name: Breandán Ó Meachair (Irish)
- Nickname: Bren
- Born: 5 January 1989 (age 37) Borrisoleigh, County Tipperary, Ireland
- Occupation: Business Owner
- Height: 1.81 m (5 ft 11 in)

Sport
- Sport: Hurling
- Position: Centre-back
Club
- Years: Club
- 2005–present: Borris–Ileigh
Club titles
- Tipperary titles: 1
- Munster titles: 1
College
- Years: College
- 2006–2009: Mary Immaculate College
College titles
- Fitzgibbon titles: 0
Inter-county*
Years	County	Apps (scores)
2009–2021	Tipperary	58 (0–28)
Inter-county titles
- Munster titles: 5
- All-Irelands: 3
- NHL: 0
- All Stars: 3
- *Inter County team apps and scores correct as of 11:48, 12 August 2021.

Brendan Maher (born 5 January 1989) is an Irish hurler who plays for club side Borris–Ileigh and previously at inter-county level with the Tipperary senior hurling team. Regarded as one of the great talents of his generation, Maher enjoyed a 13-season career with the Tipperary senior hurling team, won three All-Stars and was a Hurler of the Year nominee in 2010. He won eight major trophies in his inter-county career, comprising three All-Ireland Championships, captaining the team in 2016, and five Munster Championships. A versatile player who switched between attacking and defensive positions, Maher made a combined 124 league and championship appearances.

== Playing career ==
=== St Joseph's College ===
Maher first came to prominence as a hurler with St Joseph's College in Borrisoleigh. He played in every grade before eventually joining the senior hurling team and lined out in several Harty Cup campaigns.

=== Mary Immaculate College ===
Maher studied at Mary Immaculate College in Limerick between 2006 and 2009 and joined the senior hurling team in his second year. On 7 March 2009, he was named man of the match when Mary Immaculate College defeated the University of Ulster by 1–12 to 1–05 to win the Ryan Cup.

=== Borris-Ileigh ===
Maher joined the Borris–Ileigh club at a young age and played at all grades in juvenile and underage levels. He joined the club's senior team as a 16-year-old during the 2005 North Tipperary Championship.

On 7 August 2005, Maher was selected on the bench when Borris–Ileigh faced Nenagh Éire Óg in the North Tipperary Championship final, however, in a late change he was drafted onto the starting fifteen. He ended the game with a winners' medal after a 1–12 to 0–13 victory.

Maher lined out at right wing-forward when Borris–Ileigh renewed their rivalry with Nenagh Éire Óg in the North Tipperary Championship final on 9 September 2007. He scored a point from play and claimed a second winners' medal in three seasons following a 0–19 to 0–16 victory.

On 2 September 2017, Maher lined out at centre-back when Borris–Ileigh faced Nenagh Éire Óg in the North Tipperary Championship final once again. He ended the game with a third winner's medal following the 2–19 to 0–18 victory. On 8 October 2017, Maher was selected at midfield but spent much of the game at centre-back when Borris–Ileigh faced Thurles Sarsfields in the Tipperary Senior Championship final. He top scored for the team with five points from frees in the 1–24 to 0–11 defeat.

On 3 November 2019, Maher was at centre-back when Borris–Ileigh faced Kiladangan in the Tipperary Senior Championship final. He scored three points, including two long-range frees, and collected a winners' medal following the 1–15 to 1–12 victory. On 24 November 2019, Maher won a Munster Club Championship medal after giving a man of the match display in the 1–12 to 1–11 defeat of Ballygunner in the final.

=== Tipperary ===
==== Minor and under-21 ====
Maher first played for Tipperary as a member of the minor team during the 2005 Munster Championship. He was an unused substitute throughout before Tipperary exited the championship on 4 May 2005 following a 2–14 to 1–06 defeat by Limerick.

On 5 April 2006, Maher made his first appearance for the team when he scored three points from midfield in a 2–13 to 1–08 defeat of Clare. He retained his position at midfield for the Munster final, however, he ended on the losing side following a 2–20 to 1–15 defeat by Cork. Maher was switched to left corner-back when Tipperary faced Galway in the All-Ireland final. He ended the game with a winners' medal following the 2–18 to 2–07 victory.

Maher was again eligible for the minor grade for a third and final season in 2007 and was appointed captain of the team. On 8 July 2007, he was at left wing-forward when Tipperary won the Munster Championship following an 0–18 to 1–11 defeat of Cork. On 2 September 2007, Maher was switched to midfield for the All-Ireland final against Cork. He scored three points from play and claimed a second successive winners' medal following a 3–14 to 2–11 victory.

Maher was drafted onto the Tipperary under-21 team in advance of the 2008 Munster Championship. He made his first appearance for the team on 17 July 2008 when he lined out at left corner-back in a 1–13 to 0–15 defeat of Limerick. On 30 July 2008, Maher won a Munster Championship medal after lining out at left wing-back in a controversial 1–16 to 2–12 defeat of Clare. He retained his position at left wing-back when Tipperary suffered a 2–13 to 0–15 defeat by Kilkenny in the All-Ireland final on 14 September 2008.

On 28 July 2010, Maher won a second Munster Championship medal after lining out at left wing-back in Tipperary's 1–22 to 1–17 defeat of Clare in the final. He was switched to centre-back for the All-Ireland final against Galway on 11 September 2010. Maher ended the game with an All-Ireland medal following the 5–22 to 0–12 victory in what was his last game in the grade.

==== Senior ====
Maher joined the Tipperary senior team in advance of the 2009 National League. He made his first appearance for the team on 14 February 2009 when he played at right wing-back in a 2–15 to 0–09 defeat of Cork. On 3 May 2009, Maher came on as an 11th-minute substitute for Declan Fanning in a 2–26 to 4–17 extra-time defeat by Kilkenny in the National League final. On 31 May 2009, he made his Munster Championship debut when he came on as a 55th-minute substitute for Conor O'Mahony in a 1–19 to 0–19 defeat of Cork. On 12 July 2009, Maher started the Munster final on the bench but was introduced as a 34th-minute substitute for Paul Curran and ended the game with a winners' medal following the 4–14 to 2–16 defeat of Waterford. After making his first championship start in the All-Ireland semi-final defeat of Limerick, he was selected at left wing-back for the All-Ireland final against Kilkenny on 6 September 2009. Maher ended on the losing side following a 2–22 to 0–23 defeat.

On 5 September 2010, Maher was selected at midfield when Tipperary qualified to play Kilkenny in a second successive All-Ireland final. He scored two points from play and was described as "outstanding" after claiming his first All-Ireland medal in the 4–17 to 1–18 victory. Maher ended the season by being included at midfield on the All-Star team while he was also named Young Hurler of the Year.

A fractured fibula in March 2011 brought Maher's involvement in the latter stages of the National League to an end, while he also missed Tipperary's opening games of the Munster Championship. On 10 July 2011, he won a second Munster Championship medal after coming on as a 63rd-minute substitute for Pádraic Maher in a 7–19 to 0–19 defeat of Waterford in the Munster final. On 4 September 2011, Maher was selected on the bench when Tipperary faced Kilkenny in a third successive All-Ireland final. He was introduced as a 29th-minute substitute for John O'Keeffe but ended the game on the losing side following a 2–17 to 1–16 defeat.

On 15 July 2012, Maher lined out at midfield when Tipperary qualified to play Waterford in a second successive Munster final. He ended the game with a third winners' medal in four seasons following a 2–17 to 0–16 victory.

On 5 May 2013, Maher was selected at midfield when Tipperary faced Kilkenny in the National League final. He scored four points from play but ended on the losing side following a 2–17 to 0–20 defeat.

Maher was appointed captain of the team for the 2014 season. On 4 May 2014, he captained Tipperary in a second successive National League final against Kilkenny. Maher ended the game on the losing side following a 2–25 to 1–27 defeat. On 7 September 2014, he captained the team to a 1–28 to 3–22 draw with Kilkenny in the All-Ireland final. Maher again captained the team from right wing-back for the replay on 27 September 2014, however, he ended the game on the losing side after a 2–17 to 2–14 defeat. He ended the season by receiving a second All-Star award.

On 12 July 2015, Maher captained Tipperary to a Munster final appearance with Waterford. He was held scoreless from centre-forward but ended the game with a fourth winners' medal following the 0–21 to 0–16 victory.

Maher retained the Tipperary captaincy for a third successive season in 2016. He claimed a fifth Munster Championship medal on 10 July 2016 after lining out at midfield in a 5–19 to 0–13 defeat of Waterford in the final. On 5 September 2016, Maher captained Tipperary to a second All-Ireland final meeting in three seasons against Kilkenny. He ended the game with a second All-Ireland medal while he also had the honour of lifting the Liam MacCarthy Cup following a 2–29 to 2–20 victory. Maher also became only the fifth player ever to captain both a minor and senior hurling team to All-Ireland victory.

On 23 April 2017, Maher lined out in his fourth National League final. He scored a point from midfield but ended the game on the losing side following a 3–21 to 0–14 victory for Galway.

Maher played in a second successive National League final – his fifth overall – on 8 April 2018. Lining out at midfield, he was held scoreless and ended the game on the losing side following a 2–23 to 2–17 defeat by Kilkenny.

On 30 June 2019, Maher lined out at right wing-back when Tipperary suffered a 2–26 to 2–14 defeat by Limerick in the Munster final. On 18 August 2019, he was selected at centre-back when Tipperary faced Kilkenny in the All-Ireland final. Maher ended the game with a third All-Ireland winners' medal following the 3–25 to 0–20 victory. He ended the season by receiving an All-Star nomination.

On 12 August 2021, Maher announced his retirement from inter-county hurling after 13 years with the team.

=== Munster ===
Maher was added to the Munster team in advance of the 2012 Railway Cup. He made his first appearance for the team on 19 February 2012 when he lined out at left wing-forward in a 3–14 to 1–16 defeat by Leinster.

On 3 March 2013, Maher lined out at midfield when Munster qualified to play Connacht in the Railway Cup final. He ended the game with a Railway Cup medal following the 1–22 to 0–15 victory.

Maher was appointed captain of Munster in his fourth successive season with the team in 2016. On 15 December 2016, he won a second Railway Cup medal after captaining the team from midfield in a 2–20 to 2–16 defeat of Leinster in the final.

=== Ireland ===
On 19 October 2011, Maher was named on the Ireland squad for the Shinty/Hurling International Series. On 29 October 2011, he lined out at centre-forward when Ireland defeated Scotland on an aggregate scoreline of 3–25 to 3–19 following a two-game series.

Maher was selected for the Ireland team for the second time in his career on 22 October 2013. He claimed a second winners' medal from right wing-forward following Ireland's 5–27 to 2–26 aggregate defeat of Scotland on 2 November 2013.

== Coaching ==
In October 2022, Maher was announced as Offaly senior hurling team performance coach under the management of Johnny Kelly.

== Career statistics ==
Team	Year	National League			Munster		All-Ireland		Total	
Team	Year	Division	Apps	Score	Apps	Score	Apps	Score	Apps	Score
Tipperary	2009	Division 1	5	0-00	3	0-00	2	0-00	10	0-00
Tipperary	2010	Division 1	7	0-02	1	0-01	5	0-06	13	0-09
Tipperary	2011	Division 1	4	0-05	1	0-00	2	0-00	7	0-05
Tipperary	2012	Division 1A	6	0-06	3	0-02	1	0-00	10	0-08
Tipperary	2013	Division 1A	7	1-07	1	0-01	1	0-00	9	1–08
Tipperary	2014	Division 1A	8	0-02	1	0-00	6	0-01	15	0-03
Tipperary	2015	Division 1A	6	0-03	2	0-00	1	0-01	9	0-04
Tipperary	2016	Division 1A	6	0-04	3	0-01	2	0-01	11	0-06
Tipperary	2017	Division 1A	5	1-05	1	0-02	4	0-06	10	1–13
Tipperary	2018	Division 1A	7	0-06	4	0-01	—		11	0-07
Tipperary	2019	Division 1A	1	0-01	5	0-04	3	0-00	9	0-05
Tipperary	2020	Division 1A	—		1	0-01	2	0-00	3	0-01
Tipperary	2021	Division 1A	4	0-03	2	0-00	1	0-00	7	0-03
Career total			66	2–44	28	0–13	30	0–15	124	2–72

== Honours ==
=== Team ===
Borris–Ileigh

- Munster Senior Club Hurling Championship: 2019
- Tipperary Senior Hurling Championship: 2019
- North Tipperary Senior Hurling Championship: 2005, 2007, 2017
- All-Ireland Mini 7s Championship: 2015

Mary Immaculate College

- Ryan Cup: 2009

Tipperary

- All-Ireland Senior Hurling Championship: 2010, 2016 (c), 2019
- Munster Senior Hurling Championship: 2009, 2011, 2012, 2015 (c), 2016 (c)
- All-Ireland Under-21 Hurling Championship: 2010
- Munster Under-21 Hurling Championship: 2008, 2010
- All-Ireland Minor Hurling Championship: 2006, 2007 (c)
- Munster Minor Hurling Championship: 2007 (c)

Munster

- Railway Cup: 2013 (c), 2016 (c)

Ireland

- Composite Rules Shinty–Hurling Series: 2011, 2013

=== Individual ===
Awards

- All-Stars Young Hurler of the Year: 2010
- GAA-GPA All-Stars Awards: 2010, 2014, 2019
- The Sunday Game Team of the Year: 2014, 2019

Sporting positions
Preceded by Joey McLoughney	Tipperary Minor Hurling Captain; 2007	Succeeded by Noel McGrath
Preceded by Shane McGrath	Munster Hurling Captain; 2013	Succeeded by Wayne McNamara
Preceded by Shane McGrath	Tipperary Senior Hurling Captain; 2014–2016	Succeeded by Pádraic Maher
Preceded by Wayne McNamara	Munster Hurling Captain; 2016	Succeeded by TBA
Achievements
Preceded by Joey McLoughney	All-Ireland MHC winning captain 2007	Succeeded by Thomas Breen
Preceded by Jackie Tyrrell	Inter-Provincial Hurling Final winning captain 2013	Succeeded by Conal Keaney
Preceded by Joey Holden	All-Ireland SHC winning captain 2016	Succeeded by David Burke
Preceded by Conal Keaney	Inter-Provincial Hurling Final winning captain 2016	Succeeded by TBA
Awards
Preceded by Noel McGrath	Vodafone Young Hurler of the Year; 2010	Succeeded by Liam Rushe (Dublin)
