= Jerome Maher =

Irish hurler

Sport
- Sport: Hurling
- Position: Full-Back or Corner-Back
Club
- Years: Club
- Geraldines
Inter-county
Years	County	Apps (scores)
2009-present	Waterford	1 (0-00)
Inter-county titles
- Munster titles: 0
- All-Irelands: 0
- NHL: 0
- All Stars: 0

Jerome Maher is an Irish sportsperson. He plays hurling with his local club Geraldines and has been a member of the Waterford senior inter-county team since 2009, making his Championship debut against Tipperary in the Munster Final on 10 July 2011, starting at full back in a 7-19 to 0-19 defeat.
