= Stephen Lillis =

Irish hurler (born 1986)

Personal information
- Native name: Stiofán Laighléis (Irish)
- Born: 10 January 1986 (age 40) Thurles, County Tipperary, Ireland
- Occupation: Barman
- Height: 5 ft 10 in (178 cm)

Sport
- Sport: Hurling
- Position: Right wing-back
Club
- Years: Club
- 2004–present: Thurles Sarsfields
Club titles
- Tipperary titles: 4
Inter-county*
Years	County	Apps (scores)
2007–2012	Tipperary	1 (0-00)
Inter-county titles
- Munster titles: 0
- All-Irelands: 0
- NHL: 0
- All Stars: 0
- *Inter County team apps and scores correct as of 15:09, 1 November 2012.

Stephen Lillis (born 10 January 1986) is an Irish hurler who played as a left wing-back for the Tipperary senior team.

Lillis made his first appearance for the team during the 2007 Waterford Crystal Cup and later became a member of the extended panel for the championship. He returned to the Tipperary team for the 2011 championship. During that time he won one Waterford Crystal Cup medal.

At club level Lillis is a four-time county club championship medalist with Thurles Sarsfield's.

== Playing career ==
=== Club ===
Lillis plays his club hurling with the famous Thurles Sarsfield's club and enjoyed much success in various juvenile and under-age grades.

In 2005 Lillis lined out in his first county final at senior level. A 1–17 to 0–15 defeat of Drom-Inch gave Thurles Sarsfield's their first title in thirty-one years. It was Lillis's first championship medal.

After losing the championship decider in 2008, Thurles Sarsfield's bounced back to return to the county final again the following year. A 0–14 to 0-5 trouncing of Drom-Inch gave him Lillis his second county club championship medal.

Thurles Sarsfield's made it two-in-a-row in 2010. A 1–16 to 1–7 defeat of Clonoulty-Rossmore gave Lillis a third championship medal.

After surrendering their title in 2011, Thurles Sarsfield's were back in the county decider again the following year. A 1–21 to 2–15 defeat of Drom-Inch gave Lillis his fourth championship medal.

=== Inter-county ===
Lillis first came to prominence on the inter-county scene as a member of the Tipperary minor hurling team in 2004. He enjoyed little success in this grade before moving onto the Tipp under-21 team in 2006. In his debut year Lillis secured a Munster winners' medal in that grade following a 3–11 to 0–13 defeat of Cork. Tipp later qualified for the All-Ireland final against Kilkenny. After a thrilling 2-14 apiece draw, both sides met for a replay which Kilkenny narrowly won by 1–11 to 0–11.

Lillis made his senior debut for Tipperary in the pre-season Waterford Crystal Cup in 2007. He secured a winners' medal in that competition following a 1–17 to 2–11 defeat of Cork. Lillis was later included in Tipperary's panel for the National Hurling League and championship.

After being dropped from the team after 2007, Lillis returned as a senior panelist in 2011. He made his debut against Clare in the Munster semi-final that year, however, he played no part in Tipp's subsequent Munster final defeat of Waterford.

Lillis was dropped from the panel in 2012.

== Honours ==
=== Team ===
Thurles Sarsfield's

- Tipperary Senior Club Hurling Championship (4): 2005, 2009, 2010, 2012

Tipperary

- Waterford Crystal Cup (1): 2007
