= Aidan Kearney (hurler) =

Irish hurler (born 1984)

Personal information
- Native name: Aodán Ó Cearnaigh (Irish)
- Nickname: Ringo
- Born: 27 August 1984 (age 42) Waterford, Ireland
- Height: 1.83 m (6 ft 0 in)

Sport
- Sport: Hurling
- Position: Left Corner Back
Club
- Years: Club
- Tallow
Inter-county
Years	County	Apps (scores)
2006–2012	Waterford	15 (0–0)
Inter-county titles
- Munster titles: 2
- NHL: 1

Aidan Kearney (born 27 August 1984) is an Irish hurler who plays as a left corner-back for the Waterford senior team.

Kearney joined the team during the 2006 championship and has become a regular member of the starting fifteen over subsequent seasons. Since then he has won one Munster medal and one National Hurling League medal. Kearney has ended up as an All-Ireland runner-up on one occasion. He was educated at his local primary school and later attended St. Colman's College in Fermoy, County Cork.

There, he developed his hurling skills and played on the college's various hurling teams. Kearney enjoyed a very successful hurling career, beginning by capturing Two Dean Ryan Cup titles in-a-row in 2000, 2001 . By this stage he was also a star on the St. Colman's senior hurling team. kearney won his first Dr. Harty Cup winners' medal in 2001.[1] He later collected his first All-Ireland colleges' title when St. Colman's defeated Gort Community School in the final of that competition.[2] Kearney captured a second Harty Cup title in 2002 before later lining out in a second All-Ireland colleges' final.[3] ST KIERAN'S provided the opposition .[4] It was his second All-Ireland winners' medal. 2003 saw Kearney win a third consecutive Harty Cup winners' medal.[3] The subsequent All-Ireland final saw St. Colman's take on St. Kieran's, however, victory went to the Kilkenny team on that occasion. Aidan and his Twin brother Paul are the only Twins in the history of the Harty cup Competition to win 3 Harty Cups on the field of Play. They are the only hurlers from Waterford to have achieved winning 3 Harty Cup Titles.

At club level Kearney plays with Tallow.

== Playing career ==
=== Club ===
Kearney plays both hurling and Gaelic football with Tallow

=== Inter-county ===
Kearney first came to prominence on the inter-county scene as a member of the Waterford minor and under-21 hurling teams, however, he enjoyed little success in these grades.

In 2006 Kearney made his senior championship debut for Waterford in an All-Ireland qualifier against Westmeath.

The following season Kearney became a regular member of the starting fifteen. He won a National Hurling League medal that year when Waterford defeated Kilkenny by 0–20 to 0–18 in the final. He later claimed a first Munster medal as Waterford defeated Limerick by 3–17 to 1–14 in the provincial decider. While Waterford were viewed as possibly going on and winning the All-Ireland title for the first time in almost half a century, Limerick ambushed Kearney's side in the All-Ireland semi-final.

2008 began poorly for Waterford as the team lost their opening game to Clare as well as their manager Justin McCarthy. In spite of this poor start Kearney's side reached the All-Ireland final for the first time in forty-five years. Kilkenny provided the opposition and went on to trounce Waterford by 3–30 to 1–13 to claim a third All-Ireland title in-a-row.
