= Richie Foley =

Irish hurler

Personal information
- Native name: Risteard Ó Foghlú (Irish)
- Born: 22 July 1987 (age 39) Waterford, Ireland

Sport
- Sport: Hurling
- Position: Midfield
Club
- Years: Club
- 2004–: Abbeyside–Ballinacourty
College
- Years: College
- UCC
College titles
- Fitzgibbon titles: 1
Inter-county
- Years: County
- 2007–2014: Waterford
Inter-county titles
- Munster titles: 2
- NHL: 1

Richard 'Richie' Foley (born 22 July 1987) is an Irish sportsperson. He plays hurling with his local club Abbeyside and with the Waterford senior inter-county team. Foley usually plays at either midfield or in the half-back line.

== Career ==
Club

Foley has played at all underage levels for his club and has the notable achievement of winning county championships at every single underage grade. He currently plays at midfield for Abbeyside. In 2008, Abbeyside reached the Waterford Senior Hurling Championship Final. However, Abbeyside and Foley went on to lose the final to De La Salle. Foley also plays for the Ballinacourty football club. In 2009 they lost to The Nire in the semi-final and 2010 to Stradbally in the final.

College

Foley currently plays with University College Cork in the Fitzgibbon Cup. Foley was part of the team that beat former champions Waterford Institute of Technology to reach the 2009 final. Late that weekend, Foley lined out at wing back as part of the UCC team to win the Fitzgibbon Cup against University of Limerick. Foley had an impressive game, capped by scoring a point from over 80 meters.

Inter-county

Foley has been a member of the Waterford panel since 2007. Although not featured in any matches during 2007, Foley won both the National Hurling League and the Munster Senior Hurling Championship in that year. Foley was part of the Waterford squad which lost the 2008 All-Ireland Hurling Final to Kilkenny.

== Championship Appearances ==
| # | Date | Venue | Opponent | Score | Result | Competition | Match report |
|---|---|---|---|---|---|---|---|
| 1 | 1 June 2008 | Gaelic Grounds, Limerick | Clare | 0–0 | 0–23 : 2–26 | Munster Quarter-Final | Irish Examiner |
| 2 | 5 July 2008 | Croke Park, Dublin | Antrim | 0–0 | 6–18 : 0–15 | 2nd round Qualifier | Irish Independent |
| 3 | 14 June 2009 | Semple Stadium, Thurles | Limerick | 0–0 | 0–11 : 1-08 | Munster Semi-Final | Irish Independent |
| 4 | 20 June 2009 | Semple Stadium, Thurles | Limerick | 0–0 | 0–25 : 0–17 | Munster Semi-final Replay | RTE Sport |
| 5 | 12 July 2009 | Semple Stadium, Thurles | Tipperary | 0–1 | 2–16 : 4–14 | Munster Final | RTE Sport |
| 6 | 7 June 2010 | Semple Stadium, Thurles | Clare | 0–0 | 0–22 : 1–15 | Munster Semi-final | RTE Sport |
| 7 | 11 July 2010 | Semple Stadium, Thurles | Cork | 0–0 | 2–15 : 2–15 | Munster Final | RTE Sport |
| 8 | 17 July 2010 | Semple Stadium, Thurles | Cork | 0–1 | 1–16 : 1–13 | Munster Final Replay | RTE Sport |
| 9 | 15 August 2010 | Croke Park, Dublin | Tipperary | 0–1 | 1–18 : 3–19 | All-Ireland Semi-final | RTE Sport |
