= Clinton Hennessy =

Irish hurler

Personal information
- Native name: Clinton Ó hAonghusa (Irish)
- Born: 28 July 1977 (age 49) Ardmore, County Waterford, Ireland
- Occupations: Painter and decorator
- Height: 6 ft 1 in (185 cm)

Sport
- Sport: Hurling
- Position: Goalkeeper
Club
- Years: Club
- Ardmore
Club titles
| | Football | Hurling |
| Waterford titles | 0 | 0 |
Inter-county*
| Years | County | Apps (scores) |
| 2005–2011 | Waterford | 31 (0-00) |
Inter-county titles
- Munster titles: 2
- All-Irelands: 0
- NHL: 1
- All Stars: 0
- *Inter County team apps and scores correct as of 12:58, 5 August 2012.

Clinton Hennessy (born 28 July 1977) is an Irish hurler who played as a goalkeeper for the Waterford senior team.

Hennessy joined the team when he replaced Stephen Brenner as first-choice 'keeper in 2005 and was a regular member of the starting fifteen until his retirement in 2012. During that time he won two Munster winners' medals and one National League winners' medal. He ended up as an All-Ireland runner-up on one occasion.

At club level Hennessy plays with Ardmore.

== Playing career ==
=== Club ===
Hennessy plays both hurling and Gaelic football with Ardmore.

=== Inter-county ===
Hennessy made his debut for the Waterford senior team during the 2005 National Hurling when he started against Kilkenny. During the subsequent championship campaign he displaced Stephen Brenner as Waterford's first-choice goalkeeper.

After a heart-breaking one-point defeat to Cork in the All-Ireland semi-final of 2006, Hennessy collected his first silverware in 2007 in the form of a National Hurling League medal when Waterford defeated Kilkenny by 0–20 to 0–18. He later claimed a first Munster winners' medal as Waterford defeated Limerick by 3–17 to 1–14 in the provincial decider. While Waterford were viewed as possibly going on and winning the All-Ireland title for the first time in almost half a century, Limerick ambushed Waterford in the All-Ireland semi-final.

2008 began poorly for Waterford as the team lost their opening game to Clare as well as their manager Justin McCarthy. In spite of this poor start Hennessy's side reached the All-Ireland final for the first time in forty-five years. Kilkenny provided the opposition and went on to defeat Waterford by 3–30 to 1–13 to claim a third All-Ireland title in-a-row.

Hennessy lined out in a third Munster final in 2010 with Cork providing the opposition. A 2–15 apiece draw was the result on that occasion, however, Waterford went on to win the replay after an extra-time goal by Dan Shanahan. It was a second Munster winners' medal for Hennessy.

In 2011 Waterford attempted to make their own piece of history by winning back-to-back Munster titles. The game turned into a nightmare as the Tipperary forwards ran riot and put seven goals past Hennessy. Waterford were later defeated by eventual champions Kilkenny in the All-Ireland semi-final.

In September 2011 Hennessy announced his retirement from inter-county action.

== See also ==
- Ó hAonghusa
