= 1989 Munster Senior Hurling Championship final =

- Event: 1989 Munster Senior Hurling Championship
| Tipperary | Waterford |
| 0-26 | 2-8 |
- Date: 2 July 1989
- Venue: Páirc Uí Chaoimh, Cork
- Referee: W. Horgan (Cork)
- Attendance: 30,241
- Weather: Sunny

The 1989 Munster Senior Hurling Championship final was a hurling match that was played on 2 July 1989 at the Páirc Uí Chaoimh, Cork. The winners advanced to the semi-finals of the All-Ireland Senior Hurling Championship.

Tipperary and Waterford contested the final, with Tipperary (captained by Bobby Ryan) retaining the title, winning 0–26 to 2–8. Tipperary had a 0–12 to 1–5 lead at half-time.

== Previous Munster Final encounters ==
| Date | Venue | Tipperary score | Waterford score | Match report |
|---|---|---|---|---|
| 23 August 1925 | Fraher Field, Dungarvan | 6-06 (24) | 1-02 (5) | |
| 6 July 1958 | Semple Stadium, Thurles | 4-12 (24) | 1-05 (8) | |
| 5 August 1962 | Gaelic Grounds, Limerick | 5-14 (29) | 2-03 (9) | |
| 28 July 1963 | Gaelic Grounds, Limerick | 0-08 (8) | 0-11 (11) | |

== Match ==
=== Details ===
2 July 1989
Final

| Tipperary | 0-26 – 2-8 | Waterford |
|---|---|---|
| N. English (0-13), P. Delaney (0-3), M. Cleary (0-3), P. Fox (0-2), J. Cormack (0-1), A. Ryan (0-1), J. Hayes (0-1), J. Leahy (0-1), Conal Bonnar (0-1). | | K. Delahunty (1-4), L. O'Connor (1-1), S. Aherne (0-1), B. Sullivan (0-1), P. Prendergast (0-1). |

Páirc Uí Chaoimh, Cork
Attendance: 30,241
Referee: W. Horgan (Cork)
