= Shane Walsh (Waterford hurler) =

Irish hurler and Gaelic footballer

Personal information
- Native name: Shane Breathnach (Irish)
- Born: 1983 (age 42–43) Waterford, Ireland
- Height: 1.8 m (5 ft 11 in)

Sport
- Sport: Hurling
- Position: Full Forward
Club
- Years: Club
- The Nire–Fourmilewater
Inter-county
| Years | County | Apps (scores) |
| 2007–2014 | Waterford | 14 (8-17) |
Inter-county titles
- Munster titles: 2
- All-Irelands: 0
- NHL: 1
- All Stars: 0

Shane Walsh (born 1983) is an Irish sportsperson. He plays hurling with his local club Fourmilewater and Gaelic football with The Nire–Fourmilewater. He played at inter-county level with Waterford.

Walsh scored the winning goal for Waterford in the 2003 Munster under-21 football final, against a Kerry team that included Colm Cooper and Kieran Donaghy. Walsh won the Waterford Senior Football Championship but lost the Munster Senior Club Football Championship final with The Nire–Fourmilewater in 2006. In October 2014, Walsh retired from inter-county hurling.
