= 2007 All-Ireland Minor Hurling Championship =

All-Ireland Minor Hurling Championship 2007
Championship Details
- Dates: 21 April 2007 – 2 September 2007

All Ireland Champions
- Winners: Tipperary (18th win)
- Captain: Brendan Maher
- Manager: Declan Ryan

All Ireland Runners-up
- Runners-up: Cork
- Captain: Ryan Clifford
- Manager: Donal Cronin

Provincial Champions
- Munster: Tipperary
- Leinster: Dublin
- Ulster: Antrim
- Connacht: Not Played

Championship Statistics
- Matches Played: 26
- Top Scorer: Ryan Clifford (5-30)

The 2007 All-Ireland Minor Hurling Championship was the 77th staging of the All-Ireland Minor Hurling Championship since its establishment by the Gaelic Athletic Association in 1928. The championship began on 21 April 2007 and ended on 2 September 2007.

Tipperary entered the championship as the defending champions.

On 2 September 2007, Tipperary won the championship following a 3-14 to 2-11 defeat of Cork in the All-Ireland final. This was their second All-Ireland title in-a-row.

Cork's Ryan Clifford was the championship's top scorer with 5-30.

== Results ==
=== Leinster Minor Hurling Championship ===
First round

21 April 2007 First round	Kildare	0-3 - 3-20	Laois	Conneff Park, Clane
	N Ó Muineacháin (f), R Treanor, P Keegan (f) 0-1 each.		C Murray 1-5, A Collier 0-7 (5f), N Foyle 1-2, J Phelan 1-0, G Lahan 0-2, T Burke, D Dooley, J Gaughan, G Brophy 0-1 each.

21 April 2007 First round	Wicklow	0-8 - 5-29	Offaly	Pearse Park, Arklow
	G Murphy, G O'Brien 0-3 each, R Lambert, N Fleming 0-1 each.		J Mulrooney 3-3, D Currams 1-7, J Devery 1-2, N Dunne 0-5, A Whelahan 0-4, M Egan, D Gath 0-2 each, B Harding, B Lonergan, M Ryan, G Spollen 0-1 each.

21 April 2007 First round	Westmeath	0-12 - 2-19	Meath	Cusack Park, Mullingar
	C Murtagh, M Keegan, N Mulligan, D Hourihane, S Power (1 65) 0-2 each, D Kilcoyne, D Riggs 0-1 each.		M O'Grady 1-2, D Kennedy 1-1, B Slevin 0-4 (1f), M Dunne (1f, 2 65), D Raleigh 0-3 each, R Massey, A Waters 0-2 each, P Garvey, G Murphy 0-1 each.

24 April 2007 First round	Wexford	1-12 - 2-4	Carlow	Wexford Park, Wexford
	L Murphy 1-6, J Rackard 0-3, E Walsh 0-3.		P Kehoe 1-1, J Brennan 1-1, C Clancy 0-2.	Referee: D Connolly (Kilkenny)

Second round

5 May 2007 Second round	Wicklow	0-3 - 10-23	Wexford	Pearse Park, Arklow
	B Osborne 0-2, G O'Brien 0-1.		W Cullen 5-4, L Murphy 1-5, P Morris 0-5, J Kelly, J Rackard 1-1 each, P O'Keeffe, D Kinsella 1-0 each, S Tompkins 0-3, E Walsh 0-2, J Gahan, B Kehoe 0-1 each.

5 May 2007 Second round	Offaly	3-24 - 1-7	Kildare
	D Currams 1-3, A Whelehan 0-5 (all fs), D Bevans, T Spain 1-1 each, M Egan, N Dunne 0-3 each, J Devery, G Conneely, J Mulrooney 0-2 each, B Harding, B Lonergan 0-1 each.		J Phelan 1-1, P Keegan 0-3 (all fs), J Roche 0-2 (fs), D Butler 0-1.

5 May 2007 Second round	Westmeath	3-04 - 3-13	Laois	Cusack Park, Mullingar
	D Hourihane 1-1, D Kilcoyne 1-1, D Riggs 1-0, N Mulligan 0-1, C Flanagan 0-1.		J Phelan 1-2, N Foyle 1-1, R Delaney 1-1, G Lanham 0-2, T Deleaney 0-2, A Collier 0-2, R Dwyer 0-2, G Brophy 0-1.	Referee: C Groome (Offaly)

5 May 2007 Second round	Meath	1-04 - 2-15	Carlow	Páirc Tailteann, Navan
	D Kennedy 1-0, B Slevin 0-2, M Dunne 0-1, R Massey 0-1.		J Brennan 1-3, E Byrne 1-1, C Coughlan 0-3, D Kavanagh 0-2, P Kehoe 0-2, D Murphy 0-2, B Doyle 0-1, C Clancy 0-1.

Quarter-finals

19 May 2007 Quarter-final	Carlow	3-11 - 4-10	Laois	Dr. Cullen Park, Carlow
	P Kehoe 2-6 (1-5f), D Murphy 1-0, D Kavanagh 0-2 (1f, '65), C Coughlin, C Clancy, D Grennan 0-1 each.		A Collier 1-4 (1-3 fs), T Delaney, D Peacock, D O'Mahoney 1-0 each, J O'Loughlan 0-2, D Dooley, N Foyle, T Burke ('65), J Gaughan 0-1 each.

19 May 2007 Quarter-final	Wexford	0-17 - 0-17 (aet)	Offaly	Wexford Park, Wexford
	L Murphy 0-8, S Murphy 0-2, E Doyle 0-1, J Gahan 0-1, C Walsh 0-1, P Morris 0-1, J Kelly 0-1, B Kehoe 0-1, S Tompkins 0-1.		A Whelahan 0-8, M Egan 0-2, N Dunne 0-1, K Connolly 0-1, M Ryan 0-1, C Egan 0-1, D Currams 0-1, D Markham 0-1, D Bevans 0-1.	Referee: R Holohan (Kildare)

23 May 2007 Quarter-final replay	Offaly	4-7 - 3-20	Wexford	O'Connor Park, Tullamore
	M Egan 1-4, A Whelahan 1-1, M Ryan 1-0, D Bevans 1-0, J Mulrooney 0-1, N Dunne 0-1.		N Walsh 2-0, L Murphy 0-6, J Kelly 1-2, E Kent 0-3, M O’Hanlon 0-2, W Cullen 0-2, P O’Keeffe 0-1, J Byrne 0-1, P Morris 0-1, E Walsh 0-1, S Tompkins 0-1.	Referee: A Stapleton (Laois)

Semi-finals

23 June 2007 Semi-final	Dublin	1-13 - 0-6	Wexford	Dr. Cullen Park, Carlow
	D Treacy 0-7, D Whelan 1-0, N McMurrow 0-3, W Brogan 0-2, B O'Rorke 0-1.		L Murphy 0-5, E Moore 0-1.	Referee: S Cleere (Kilkenny)

23 June 2007 Semi-final	Kilkenny	1-17 - 0-16	Laois	Dr. Cullen Park, Carlow
	M Bergin 0-7, M Murphy 1-1, A Stapleton 0-2, S Brennan 0-2, M Fagan 0-2, T Breen 0-1, J Nolan 0-1, J Brennan 0-1.		D Peacock 0-5, T Burke 0-2, J O'Loughlin 0-2, J Gaughan 0-2, G Brophy 0-1, A Collier 0-1, N Foyle 0-1, D O'Mahoney 0-1, J Phelan 0-1.	Referee: F Devereaux (Kildare)

Final

1 July 2007 Final	Dublin	2-14 - 1-10	Kilkenny	Croke Park, Dublin
	B O'Rorke 1-2, P Garbutt 1-0, W Brogan 0-3, D Whelan 0-3, D Treacy 0-3, P Kelly 0-1, A McMullan 0-1, E McCabe 0-1.		M Bergin 0-5, P Murphy 1-0, M Murphy 0-2, S Brennan 0-2, A Stapleton 0-1.	Referee: A Stapleton (Laois)

=== Munster Minor Hurling Championship ===
Quarter-finals

2 May 2007 Quarter-final	Tipperary	3-12 - 1-11	Clare	Gaelic Grounds, Limerick
	J O'Neill 2-0, S Hennessy 0-6, P Maher 1-0, N McGrath 0-3, K Lorrigan 0-2, M Heffernan 0-1.		J Conlon 1-3, S Collins 0-2, D Malone 0-1, K Heagney 0-1, C Morey 0-1, N O'Connell 0-1, I White 0-1, P Vaughan 0-1.

2 May 2007 Quarter-final	Cork	3-15 - 0-9	Waterford	Páirc Uí Chaoimh, Cork
	R Clifford 3-4, D Stack 0-4, L O'Farrell 0-3, D O'Sullivan 0-2, M Sexton 0-1, R White 0-1.		S Power 0-4, S Kearney 0-2, C Maloney 0-1, K Duggan 0-1, C Curran 0-1.

Play-off

9 May 2007 Play-off	Clare	1-9 - 1-8	Waterford	Semple Stadium, Thurles
	K Heagney 0-4; P Vaughan 1-0; D Honan 0-2; R Shanahan 0-2; J Conlon 0-1.		S Power 1-5; T Casey 0-1; K Duggan 0-1; S Kearney 0-1.

Semi-finals

23 June 2007 Semi-final	Limerick	0-12 - 3-21	Tipperary	Gaelic Grounds, Limerick.
	N Maher 0-7 (0-5 frees, 0-1 65); T O’Brien 0-2; G Mulcahy, P O’Brien, S Tobin 0-1 each.		S Hennessy 0-7 (0-4 frees); P Maher 2-1; J O’Neill 0-5; B Maher 0-4; M Heffernan 1-1; N McGrath 0-2; J Barry 0-1.	Referee: C Lyons (Cork)

27 June 2007 Semi-final	Cork	1-20 - 0-14	Clare	Semple Stadium, Thurles
	R Clifford 0-9 (0-8 frees, 0-1 65); P Goold 0-4; J Gunning 1-0 (og); R White 0-2; K O’Farrell, E McCarthy, D Stack, R O’Driscoll, D O’Sullivan 0-1 each.		B Earley 0-5 (0-4 frees); K Heagney 0-3 (0-2 frees); S Collins 0-2; B O’Connell, C Morey, E Madden, J Conlon 0-1 each.	Referee: P Casey (Waterford)

Final

8 July 2007 Final	Tipperary	0-18 - 1-11	Cork	Semple Stadium, Thurles
	S Hennessy 0-9, B Maher 0-3, J O'Neill 0-2, J Gallagher 0-2, N McGrath 0-1, D O'Brien 0-1.		D Stack 1-1, R Clifford 0-4, P Goold 0-2, L O'Farrell 0-1, R White 0-1, M Bowles 0-1, C Sheehan 0-1.	Referee: P Casey (Waterford)

=== Ulster Minor Hurling Championship ===
Semi-final

20 May 2007 Semi-final	Down	2-13 - 0-8	Derry	Casement Park, Belfast
	M McGee 1-3, P O'Neill 1-2, J Coyle 0-5, P Keith 0-2, P Flynn 0-1.		P Henry 0-6, D McCloskey 0-1, A Grant 0-1.	Referee: R Matthews (Antrim)

Final

26 May 2007 Final	Antrim	2-14 - 3-8	Down	Casement Park, Belfast
	M McCarthy (1-4, o-1 free), D Hamill (1-4), PJ O'Connell (0-3), C Carson (0-2), C Donnelly (0-1).		J Coyle (1-2, 0-2 frees), C Woods (1-1, 1-0 pen, 0-1 a '65'), A Clarke (1-1), P Keith (0-2), K Maxwell (0-1), A Higgins (0-1).	Referee: M Mulholland (Derry)

=== All-Ireland Minor Hurling Championship ===
Quarter-finals

29 July 2007 Quarter-final	Kilkenny	2-31 - 0-6	Antrim	Croke Park, Dublin
	S Brennan 1-6, M Moloney 1-5, A Stapleton 0-7, C Fennelly 0-4, M Murphy 0-3, J Brennan 0-2, P Murphy 0-2, S Waugh 0-1, T Breen 0-1.		D Hamill 0-2, PJ O'Connell 0-2, A McCaffrey 0-1, M McCarthy 0-1.	Referee: J O'Mahony (Limerick)

29 July 2007 Quarter-final	Cork	2-19 - 0-8	Galway	Croke Park, Dublin
	R Clifford 1-5 (0-4 frees); M Bowles 0-4; D Stack 1-1; M O'Mahony, K O'Farrell 0-3 each; S Farrell 0-2; J Herlihy 0-1 (65).	Report	K Killilea, E Forde (0-1 65) 0-3 each; E Moloney, J Hennelly 0-1 (free).	Referee: J Owens (Wexford)

Semi-finals

4 August 2017 Semi-final	Dublin	0-13 - 2-10	Cork	O'Moore Park, Portlaoise
	D Treacy 0-4, N McMorrow 0-4, W Brogan 0-2, P Garbutt 0-1.	Report	R Clifford 1-2, M O’Mahony 1-0, P Gould 0-2, M Bowles 0-2, D Stack 0-1, D O’Sullivan 0-1, L McLoughlin 0-1.	Referee: E O'Shaughnessy (Galway)

12 August 2017 Semi-final	Tipperary	1-19 - 2-12	Kilkenny	Croke Park, Dublin
	S Hennessy 0-7, M Heffernan 1-3, J O’Neill 0-4, B Maher 0-2, S Carey 0-2, P Murphy 0-1.		S Brennan 1-6, A Stapleton 1-2, J Brennan 0-2, M Moloney 0-1, J Fitzpatrick 0-1.	Referee: G Devlin (Armagh)

Final

2 September 2007 Final	Tipperary	3-14 - 2-11	Cork	Croke Park, Dublin
	S Carey (2-0), M Heffernan (1-2), S Hennessy (0-4, 3 frees), B Maher (0-3), J O’Neill (0-2), N McGrath (0-1), P Maher (0-1), P Murphy (0-1).	Report	R Clifford (0-6, 3 frees), R White (1-0), L Farrell (1-0), M O’Mahony (0-3), P Gould (0-2).	Referee: J Owens (Wexford)

== Championship statistics ==
=== Top scorers ===
Top scorers overall

Rank	Player	Club	Tally	Total	Matches	Average
1	Ryan Clifford	Cork	5-30	45	6	7.50
2	Lee Murphy	Wexford	2-30	36	5	7.20
3	Séamus Hennessy	Tipperary	0-34	34	5	6.80
4	Shane Brennan	Kilkenny	2-16	22	4	5.50
5	Willie Cullen	Wexford	5-06	21		
5	Aaron Whelehan	Offaly	1-18	21	4	5.25
7	John O'Neill	Tipperary	2-13	19	5	3.80
8	Paudie Kehoe	Carlow	3-09	18	3	6.00
9	Dan Currams	Offaly	2-11	17	4	4.25
9	Andrew Collier	Laois	1-14	17	4	4.25

Top scorers in a single game

Rank	Player	Club	Tally	Total	Opposition
1	Willie Cullen	Wexford	5-04	19	Wicklow
2	Ryan Clifford	Cork	3-04	13	Waterford
3	James Mulrooney	Offaly	3-03	12	Wicklow
3	Paudie Kehoe	Carlow	2-06	12	Laois
5	Dan Currams	Offaly	1-07	10	Wicklow
6	Lee Murphy	Wexford	1-06	9	Carlow
6	Shane Brennan	Kilkenny	1-06	9	Antrim
6	Shane Brennan	Kilkenny	1-06	9	Tipperary
6	Ryan Clifford	Cork	0-09	9	Clare
6	Séamus Hennessy	Tipperary	0-09	9	Cork
