= Shane McGrath (hurler) =

Irish hurler (born 1984)

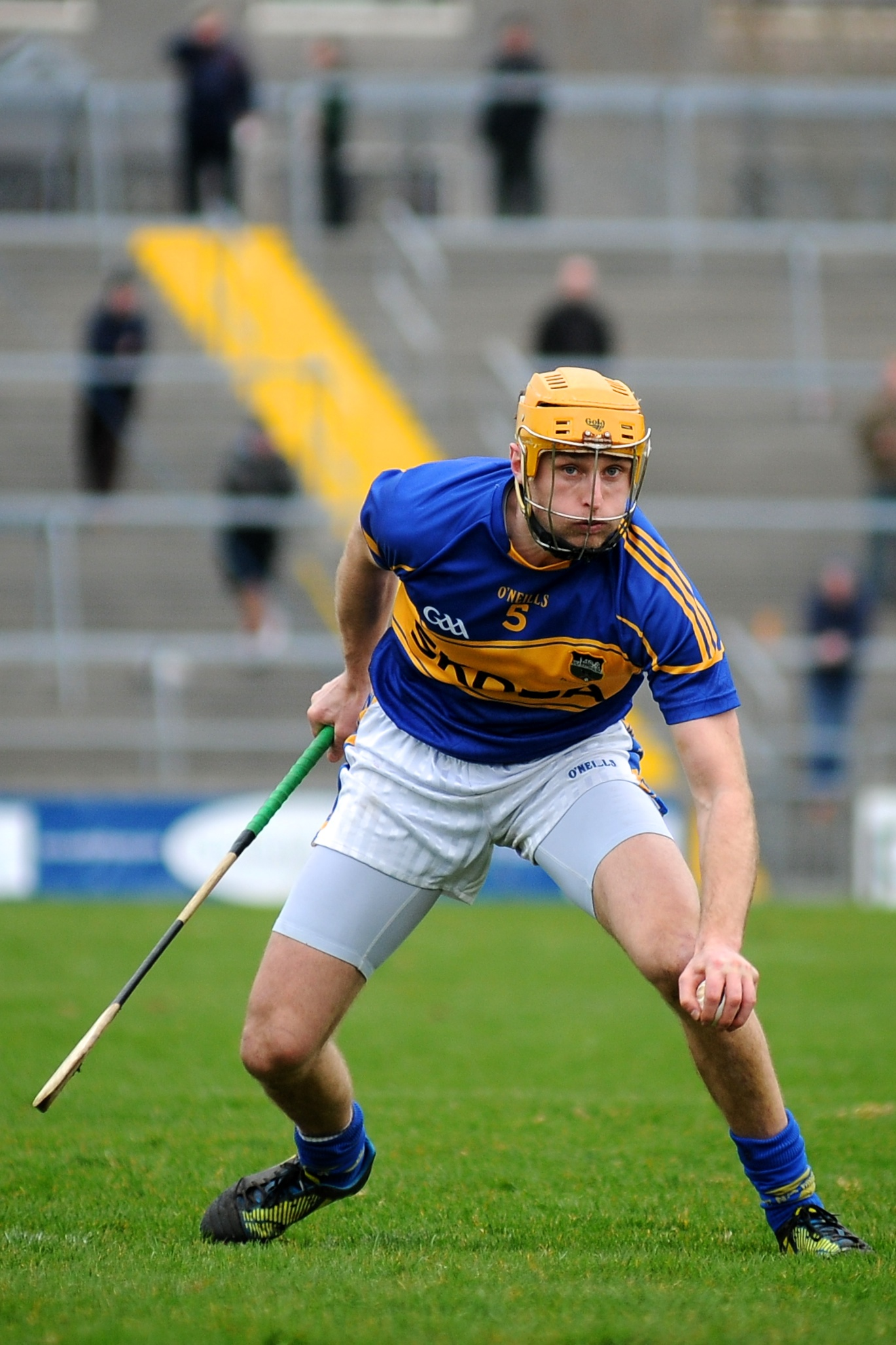
- Shane McGrath in action for Tipperary against Galway in the 2014 National Hurling League

Personal information
- Native name: Seán Mac Craith (Irish)
- Born: 12 September 1984 (age 42) Ballinahinch, County Tipperary, Ireland
- Occupation: Primary school teacher
- Height: 6 ft 0 in (183 cm)

Sport
- Sport: Hurling
- Position: Midfield
Club
- Years: Club
- Ballinahinch
Club titles
- Tipperary titles: 0
College
- Years: College
- Limerick IT
College titles
- Fitzgibbon titles: 2
Inter-county*
Years	County	Apps (scores)
2006–2015	Tipperary	45 (0-36)
Inter-county titles
- Munster titles: 5
- All-Irelands: 1
- NHL: 1
- All Stars: 2
- *Inter County team apps and scores correct as of 19:50, 31 October 2012.

Shane McGrath (born 12 September 1984) is an Irish hurler who played as a midfielder for the Tipperary senior team.

McGrath made his first appearance for the team during the 2006 National League. During his career he has won one All-Ireland winners' medals, five Munster winners' medals, one National Hurling League winners' medal, two Fitzgibbon Cup medals, two Railway Cup medals, one Munster Under-21 Hurling Championship medal and two All-Star awards. He has ended up as an All-Ireland runner-up on two occasions.

Mcgrath is known for his aerial ability, horizontal hurling and his piercing runs through the heart of any defence, in 2014 Mcgrath scored eight points from play from midfield in the All-Ireland semi-final and final. At club level along with his three brothers McGrath plays with Ballinahinch gaa club. McGrath was appointed Tipperary Senior hurling captain for the 2013 season. On 17 November 2015 he announced his retirement from inter county.

== Playing career ==
=== Club ===
McGrath plays his club hurling with his local club in Ballinahinch gaa club. He has enjoyed some success but has yet to win a senior county club championship.

=== University ===
McGrath also enjoyed much success with the Limerick Institute of Technology (LIT) in the universities and colleges series of games. In 2005 he was on the LIT team that defeated near neighbours University of Limerick in the final.

In 2007 he won a second Fitzgibbon Cup medal as the National University of Ireland, Galway were defeated by 2–15 to 0–13 in the final.

McGrath also won a Ryan Cup medal as a student of Mary Immaculate College, Limerick in 2009.

=== Inter-county ===
McGrath first came to prominence on the inter-county scene as a member of the Tipperary intermediate team in 2003. He enjoyed little success during his three years in this grade.

In 2004 McGrath joined the Tipperary under-21 hurling panel. He found it difficult to break onto the starting fifteen and finished his time in this grade without any major successes on the field of play.

McGrath made his senior competitive debut for Tipperary in a National Hurling League game against Limerick in 2006. Later that season he made his championship debut against the same opposition, however, Tipperary went on to lose a second successive Munster final to Cork.

In 2008 Tipp remained undefeated in the National League before meeting Galway in the final. In an exciting game Tipp emerged victorious by 3–18 to 3-16 and McGrath collected his first National League winners' medal. Tipperary later reached the Munster final where they defeated a resurgent Clare team by 2–21 to 0–19. It was McGrath 's first Munster winners' medal. Tipperary were subsequently defeated in a tense All-Ireland semi-final by Waterford on a scoreline of 1–20 to 1–18. In spite of falling short in the championship, McGrath later collected his first All-Star award.

McGrath won his second Munster medal in 2009 as Tipp defeated Waterford by 4–14 to 2–16. After a six-week lay-off and a facile semi-final win over Limerick, Tipp qualified for an All-Ireland final meeting with Kilkenny. For much of the match it looked as if Tipp would pull off a shock and deny 'the Cats' a record-equaling four-in-a-row. Two quick goals in the space of a minute, one from a penalty by Henry Shefflin, sealed a 2–22 to 0–23 victory and defeat for Tipperary.

After surrendering their Munster title to Cork at the first hurdle in 2010, Tipperray regrouped in the qualifiers and reached a second successive All-Ireland decider. Kilkenny, a team chasing a fifth successive championship, provided the opposition and a great game was expected. Tipperary got off to a great start which was bolstered by an early Lar Corbett goal. He subsequently completed a hat-trick of goals and Tipperary had a fourth by Noel McGrath to deny Kilkenny's drive-for-five and secure a remarkable and convincing 4–17 to 1–18 victory. It was McGrath's first All-Ireland medal in any grade.

Tipperary returned as provincial kingpins once again in 2011. A 7–19 to 0-19 trouncing of Waterford in the southern decider gave McGrath a third Munster medal. For the third successive year, Tipperary faced off against Kilkenny in the All-Ireland final, however, on this occasion Kilkenny were slight underdogs going up against the new champions. Kilkenny started quickly and never surrendered the lead in the 2–17 to 1–16 victory.

In spite of an indifferent National League campaign, Tipperary were regarded as potential All-Ireland champions once again. A 2–17 to 0–16 defeat of Waterford in the provincial decider gave McGrath a fourth Munster medal in five seasons. Tipperary later faced a humiliating 4–24 to 1–15 defeat by eventual champions Kilkenny in the All-Ireland semi-final.

In October 2014, McGrath won his second All Stars Award after a successful 2014 campaign where Tipperary reached the All-Ireland Final.

In November 2015, McGrath announced his retirement from inter-county hurling.

=== Inter-provincial ===
McGrath has also been a regular on the Munster team during various inter-provincial campaigns. He won his first Railway Cup medal in 2007 following a 2–22 to 2–19 defeat of Connacht, then won his second medal when he captained the side to glory in the semi-final of the 2013 tournament but was injured for the final that year.

== Honours ==
=== Team ===
Limerick Institute of Technology

- Fitzgibbon Cup (1): 2005, 2007

Mary Immaculate College, Limerick

- Ryan Cup (1): 2009

Tipperary

- All-Ireland Senior Hurling Championship (1): 2010
- Munster Senior Hurling Championship (5): 2008, 2009, 2011, 2012, 2015
- National Hurling League (1): 2008
- Munster Player of the Year: 2008

Munster

- Inter-provincial Championship (2): 2007, 2013

Individual

- All-Stars (2): 2008, 2014

Sporting positions
Preceded by Paul Curran	Tipperary Senior Hurling Captain; 2013	Succeeded by Brendan Maher
