= David Young (hurler) =

Irish hurler (born 1985)

Personal information
- Native name: Daithí de Siún (Irish)
- Born: 13 July 1985 (age 41) Toomevara, Ireland
- Occupation: Teacher
- Height: 1.83 m (6 ft 0 in)

Sport
- Sport: Hurling
- Position: Right half-back
Club
- Years: Club
- 2002–: Toomevara
Club titles
- Tipperary titles: 4
- Munster titles: 2
Inter-county
- Years: County
- 2010–2012 2015–: Tipperary; Kildare
Inter-county titles
- All-Irelands: 1

David Young (born 13 July 1985) is an Irish hurler who currently plays since 2015 as a right wing-back for the Kildare senior team. He previously played for the Tipperary senior team.

Young made his first appearance for the team during the 2010 National League and has remained a peripheral player over the last few seasons. During that time he has won one All-Ireland winners' medal on the field of play. He has ended up as an All-Ireland runner-up on two occasions.

At club level Young is a two-time Munster medalist with Toomevara. In addition to this he has also won four county club championship medal.

== Playing career ==
=== Club ===
Young plays his club hurling with Toomevara and has enjoyed much success.

After joining the club's senior team as a minor, Young lined out in his first county final in 2003. A 3–16 to 3–13 defeat of Thurles Sarsfield's once again, gave him his first county club championship medal.

Toomevara retained their title in 2004 following a comfortable 4–12 to 2–12 win over Éire Óg/Golden. It was a second successive championship medal for Young. After a number of early exits from the provincial championship in recent years, Toomevara subsequently defeated Mount Sion by just a single point to give Young his first Munster medal.

After surrendering their county and provincial titles in 2005, Toomevara returned to the county championship decider once again the following year. A thrilling 1–21 to 2–14 defeat of Nenagh Éire Óg saw Toomevara take the title once again. Young later won a second Munster medal following a controversial 2–9 to 2–8 defeat of Erin's Own of Cork.

In 2008 Young won a fourth county championship medal following a 2–14 to 0–17 defeat of old rivals Thurles Sarsfield's.

=== Inter-county ===
Young first came to prominence on the inter-county scene as a member of the Tipperary minor hurling team in 2003. He won a Munster medal in his one year with the team following a 2–12 to 0–16 defeat of Cork.

By 2006 Young was captain of the Tipperary under-21 team. A 3–11 to 0–13 defeat of Cork gave him a Munster medal in that grade. Young later led his team to an All-Ireland showdown with Kilkenny. An exciting game resulted in a 2-14 apiece draw. Kilkenny narrowly won the replay by 1–11 to 0–11.

Young made his senior debut for Tipperary in a National Hurling League game against Limerick in 2010. Later that season he made his championship debut against Wexford in the All-Ireland qualifiers. Tipperray regrouped in the qualifiers and reached a second successive All-Ireland decider. Kilkenny, a team chasing an unprecedented fifth successive championship, provided the opposition and a great game was expected. Tipperary got off to a great start which was bolstered by an early Lar Corbett goal. He subsequently completed a hat-trick of goals and Tipperary had a fourth by Noel McGrath to deny Kilkenny's drive-for-five and secure a remarkable and convincing 4–17 to 1–18 victory. Young came on as a substitute in that game to claim an All-Ireland medal on the field of play.

Young started Tipperary's two opening championship games in 2011 but was dropped from the starting fifteen for Tipp's Munster final triumph over Waterford. For the third successive year, Tipperary faced off against Kilkenny in the All-Ireland final, however, on this occasion Kilkenny were slight underdogs going up against the new champions. Kilkenny started quickly and never surrendered the lead in the 2–17 to 1–16 victory. Young came on as a substitute in this game having missed Tipp's previous two games.

In 2012 Young was still a member of Tipperary's extended panel, but played no part in their championship campaign.

In 2015 Young will play with the Kildare senior hurling team.

== Honours ==
=== Team ===
Toomevara

- Munster Senior Club Hurling Championship (2): 2004, 2006
- Tipperary Senior Club Hurling Championship (4): 2003, 2004, 2006, 2008

Tipperary

* All Ireland Intermediate Hurling Championship (C) (1): 2013

* Munster Intermediate Hurling Championship (C) (1): 2013

- All-Ireland Senior Hurling Championship (1): 2010
- Munster Under-21 Hurling Championship (1): 2006
- Munster Minor Hurling Championship (1): 2003
