= 2002 Munster Senior Hurling Championship final =

- Event: 2002 Munster Senior Hurling Championship
Waterford	Tipperary
2-23	3-12
- Date: 30 June 2002
- Venue: Páirc Uí Chaoimh, Cork
- Man of the Match: Fergal Hartley (Waterford)
- Referee: Aodán Mac Suibhne
- Attendance: 40,276
- Weather: Cloudy

The 2002 Munster Senior Hurling Championship final (sponsored by Guinness) was a hurling match played on Sunday 30 June 2002 at Páirc Uí Chaoimh, Cork, County Cork,. It was contested by Waterford and Tipperary. Waterford claimed their first Munster Championship since 1963 and their sixth title in total, beating Tipperary on a scoreline of 2–23 to 3–12, an eight-point winning margin.

Waterford, with Justin McCarthy in his first season as manager, had defeated Cork in the semi-final by 1–16 to 1–15 to reach the final, while Tipperary, the reigning All-Ireland Champions and managed by Nicky English, had defeated Clare by 1–18 to 2–13 in the quarter-final and Limerick by 1–20 to 1–13 in the semi-final to reach the final. The match was screened live by RTÉ as part of The Sunday Game programme.

== Match ==
=== Summary ===
Waterford's top scorers during the game were Paul Flynn and Ken McGrath, who scored one goal and 13 points between them. At half-time Tipperary led by 1–10 to 1-09, but with a strong breeze in the second half in their favour Waterford went on to score 1–14 with Tony Browne scoring a second Waterford goal in the fifty-third minute, as Waterford scored 1-6 without reply in the final twenty minutes to secure an eight-point victory and their first Munster title in 39 years. The winning Waterford captain was Fergal Hartley, who collected the Munster Hurling Cup at the end of the match.

=== Details ===
30 June
Final

Waterford	2-23 - 3-12	Tipperary
P. Flynn 1-6; K. McGrath 0-7; J. Mullane 0-4; T. Browne 1-0; E. Kelly 0-3; D. Bennett 0-1; E. McGrath 0-1; S. Prendergast 0-1	Report	B. Dunne 2-2; E. Kelly 1-4; T. Dunne 0-2; L. Corbett 0-1; C. Gleeson 0-1; J. Carroll 0-1; B. O'Meara 0-1

Páirc Uí Chaoimh, Cork
Attendance: 40,276
Referee: A. Mac Suibhne (Dublin))

Waterford	Tipperary
