= Paddy Stapleton =

Irish hurler

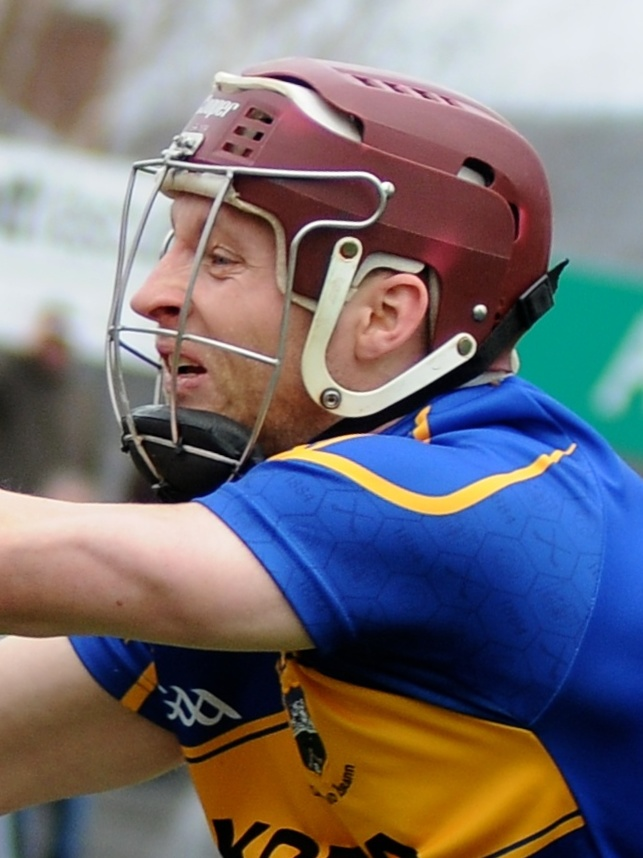

Personal information
- Nickname: Saint
- Born: 3 August 1985 (age 41) Borrisoleigh, County Tipperary, Ireland
- Occupation: Teacher
- Height: 5 ft 10 in (178 cm)

Sport
- Sport: Hurling
- Position: Right corner-back
Club
- Years: Club
- Borris–Ileigh
Club titles
- Tipperary titles: 1
- Munster titles: 1
Inter-county*
Years	County	Apps (scores)
2006- 2016	Tipperary	28 (0-01)
Inter-county titles
- Munster titles: 6
- All-Irelands: 2
- NHL: 1
- All Stars: 0
- *Inter County team apps and scores correct as of 12:38, 30 October 2012.

Patrick Stapleton (born 3 August 1985) is an Irish hurler who played as a right corner-back for the Tipperary senior team from 2006 until 2016.

Stapleton made his first appearance for the team during the 2007 Waterford Crystal Cup. During that time he won two All-Ireland winners' medals and six Munster winners' medals.

At club level, Stapleton is a three-time North Tipperary medalist with Borris–Ileigh. He had the honour of captaining the side to victory over Nenagh Éire Óg in the 2017 decider.

== Playing career ==
=== Club ===
Stapleton plays his club hurling with the Borris–Ileigh club and has enjoyed some success. After enjoying little success at underage levels, he graduated onto the senior team where he won North Tipperary county titles in 2005, 2007, and 2017. On 24/09/2017, Stapleton guided his club to their first Tipperary Senior Hurling Championship decider since 1988 having defeated Drom-Inch in the semi-final. His side was subsequently defeated in the decider by Thurles Sarsfields.

On 3 November 2019, Borris–Ileigh won their first Tipperary Championship since 1986 with a 1–15 to 1–12 win over Kiladangan in the final.

Munster honours followed on 24 November 2019, when Stapleton and his Borris–Ileigh teammates, against the odds, defeated Ballygunner to claim the club's second Munster Club title and first since 1986.

=== Minor & under-21 ===
Stapleton first came to prominence on the inter-county scene as a member of the Tipperary minor hurling team in 2003. He collected a Munster winners' medal that year following a 2–12 to 0–16 defeat of Cork. Stapleton's side, however, were later defeated by Galway in the All-Ireland semi-final.

Three years later in 2006, Stapleton was a key fixture on the Tipperary under-21 hurling team. He was in his final year on the team when he secured a Munster winners' medal in that grade following a 3–11 to 0–13 defeat of Cork. Tipperary later qualified for the All-Ireland final to face Kilkenny. After a thrilling 2-14 apiece draw, Kilkenny narrowly won the replay by 1–11 to 0–11.

=== Senior ===
Stapleton made his senior competitive debut for Tipperary against Waterford in the pre-season Waterford Crystal Cup in 2006. He made his National Hurling League debut against Limerick in 2008, coming on as a substitute. He remained a fringe player for the next few years, coming on as a blood substitute in the All-Ireland semi-final defeat by Waterford in 2008 to make his Championship debut.

In 2009 Stapleton was included on Tipperary's championship starting fifteen for the very first time against Cork. He won his first Munster medal that year as Tipp defeated Waterford by 4–14 to 2–16. After a six-week lay-off and a facile semi-final win over Limerick, a game which saw Stapleton pick up the man of the match award, Tipp qualified for an All-Ireland final meeting with Kilkenny. For much of the match it looked as if Tipp would pull off a shock and deny 'the Cats' a record-equaling four-in-a-row. Two quick goals in the space of a minute, one from a penalty by Henry Shefflin, sealed a 2–22 to 0–23 victory and defeat for Tipperary. Following the completion of the championship Stapleton was nominated for the All Star Team and Opel Gaelic Players' Association Team of the Year.

Stapleton remained as Tipperary's first-choice right corner-back once again in 2010. After surrendering their Munster title to Cork, Tipperray regrouped in the qualifiers and reached a second successive All-Ireland decider. Kilkenny, a team chasing a fifth successive championship, provided the opposition and a great game was expected. Tipperary got off to a great start which was bolstered by an early Lar Corbett goal. He subsequently completed a hat-trick of goals and Tipperary had a fourth by Noel McGrath to deny Kilkenny's drive-for-five and secure a remarkable and convincing 4–17 to 1–18 victory. It was Stapleton's first All-Ireland winners' medal.

Tipperary returned as provincial kingpins once again in 2011. A 7–19 to 0-19 trouncing of Waterford in the southern decider gave Stapleton a second Munster medal. For the third successive year, Tipperary faced off against Kilkenny in the All-Ireland final, however, on this occasion Kilkenny were slight underdogs going up against the new champions. Kilkenny started quickly and never surrendered the lead in the 2–17 to 1–16 victory. In 2012 Stapleton lost his place on Tipperary's starting fifteen.

On 22 November 2016, Stapleton announced his retirement from inter-county hurling. In a statement, he said " Following ten wonderful years playing senior hurling for Tipperary since first being called up by Babs Keating in 2006, which had until then been a lifelong dream, I wish to announce my retirement from the inter-county scene, I wish to thank my family, especially my parents Patricia and John, for all the positivity and advice through the years and also to my partner Jozette and close friends for supporting me always, particularly when I had injury setbacks. I owe a huge gratitude of thanks to the Principal and my fellow staff members of Coláiste Mhuire Co-Ed Secondary School, Thurles, who facilitated me in any way they could during my time with the county."

== Honours ==
=== Team ===
Borris–Ileigh

- Munster Senior Club Hurling Championship (1): 2019
- Tipperary Senior Hurling Championship (1): 2019
- North Tipperary Senior Club Hurling Championship (3): 2005, 2007, 2017

Tipperary

- All-Ireland Senior Hurling Championship (2): 2010, 2016
- Munster Senior Hurling Championship (6): 2008, 2009, 2011, 2012, 2015, 2016
- National Hurling League (1): 2008
- Waterford Crystal Cup (2): 2007, 2014
- Munster Under-21 Hurling Championship (1): 2006
- Munster Minor Hurling Championship (1): 2003

Individual

- GAA GPA All Stars Awards Nomination (3): 2009, 2010, 2014
