= Benny Dunne =

Irish hurler

Personal information
- Native name: Breandán Ó Doinn (Irish)
- Nickname: Benny
- Born: 22 September 1980 (age 46) Toomevara, County Tipperary, Ireland
- Occupation: Key Account Manager
- Height: 5 ft 10 in (178 cm)

Sport
- Sport: Hurling
- Position: Midfield
Club
- Years: Club
- 1999–present: Toomevara
Club titles
- Tipperary titles: 7
- Munster titles: 2
- All-Ireland Titles: 0
Inter-county*
Years	County	Apps (scores)
2002–2011	Tipperary	39 (5–31)
Inter-county titles
- Munster titles: 3
- All-Irelands: 1
- NHL: 1
- All Stars: 0
- *Inter County team apps and scores correct as of 17:48, 8 August 2012.

Benny Dunne (born 22 September 1980) is an Irish hurler who played as a midfielder for the Tipperary senior team. He joined the team in 2002 and was a regular member of the starting fifteen until his retirement in 2011.

Younger brother of current selector Tommy, Dunne was a stalwart on the Tipperary team for a decade. He has won one All-Ireland winners' medal, three Munster winners' medals and one National League winners' medal. He ended up as an All-Ireland runner-up on two occasions.

At club level Dunne is a two-time Munster medalist with Toomevara. In addition to this he has also won seven county club championship medals.

== Playing career ==
=== Club ===
Dunne plays his club hurling with Toomevara and has enjoyed much success during his playing career.

When Dunne joined the club's senior team at the turn of the century Tomoevara were in the process of winning their first four-in-a-row of county club championship titles. He was a key part of the last three finals, winning medals on the field of play.

More success followed for Dunne, winning back-to-back county titles in 2003 and 2004, as well as winning a first Munster club title. In 2006 Dunne won his sixth Tipperary SHC title. He subsequently captured his second Munster title, however, his side lost in the All-Ireland club semi-final with Dunne's brother, Tommy Dunne, being controversially sent off.

A seventh county championship medal was annexed in 2008.

=== Inter-county ===
Dunne first came to prominence on the inter-county scene as a member of the Tipperary under-21 hurling team in 2000. His two-year stint with this team was largely unsuccessful in terms of capturing any silverware.

Dunne made his senior debut in a National Hurling League game against Derry in 2002. His introduction to the senior team coincided with a downturn in Tipp's fortunes following an undefeated season in 2001. After losing the Munster final to Waterford Dunne's side subsequently exited the championship at the hands of eventual champions Kilkenny in the All-Ireland semi-final.

2003 was also a disappointing year for Tipperary. The team exited the provincial championship at an early stage, however, they still reached the All-Ireland semi-final where they were trounced by Kilkenny for the second consecutive year.

In 2004 Tipp crashed out of the Munster championship at an early stage once again and were later defeated by arch rivals Cork in the qualifiers.

In 2005 Dunne was appointed captain of the team as Tipp bounced back to reach the Munster final. Cork, the All-Ireland champions, provided the opposition on that occasion; however, it was the Leesiders that emerged victorious by 1–21 to 1–16. Tipp were later eliminated from the championship by old rivals and subsequent All-Ireland finalists Galway.

In 2006 Babs Keating returned as manager of the team, however, Dunne was relegated to the substitutes' bench. He was introduced in the Munster final against Cork, however, it was 'the Rebels' who triumphed on a score line of 2–14 to 1–14. Dunne played no further part in the championship as Tipp were eventually knocked out by Waterford in the All-Ireland quarter-final,

In 2007 Dunne endured another frustrating season as Tipp failed to land any silverware yet again. Babs Keating was replaced by Liam Sheedy as manager following the completion of the championship. Although Dunne was still on the fringe of the starting fifteen, he still played a key role as an impact sub. Tipp began the year well by winning the Waterford Crystal Cup. The men from the Premier County later remained undefeated in the National League before meeting Galway in the final. In an exciting game Tipp emerged victorious by 3–18 to 3–16 and Dunne collected his first National League winners' medal. Tipperary later reached the Munster final where they defeated a resurgent Clare team by 2–21 to 0–19. Dunne came off the bench to collect his first Munster winners' medal. Tipperary were subsequently defeated in a tense All-Ireland semi-final by Waterford on a scoreline of 1–20 to 1–18.

At the start of 2009 Tipperary were regarded as the main challengers to Kilkenny's assault on the four-in-a-row of All-Ireland championship titles. Both sides lined out against each other in the final of the National League. Tipperary stormed into a decisive lead as they took the game by the scruff of the; however, 'the Cats' clawed their way back into the game. At the end of normal time both sides were level. A period of extra-time followed, however, in spite of a 2–26 to 4–17 defeat, Dunne's side were widely lauded for their performance. The subsequent championship campaign saw Tipp reach the Munster final for a second consecutive year. Dunne's side had a good lead at the interval, however, the Decies fought back to narrow the deficit and maybe cause an upset. In the end Tipp won the game by 4–14 to 2–16. Once again Dunne was introduced as a sub and collected his second consecutive Munster winners' medal. After a six-week lay-off and a facile semi-final win over Limerick, Tipp qualified for an All-Ireland final meeting with Kilkenny. For much of the match it looked as if Tipp would pull off a shock and deny 'the Cats' a record-equaling four-in-a-row. Two quick goals in the space of a minute, one from a penalty by Henry Shefflin, sealed a 2–22 to 0–23 victory and defeat for Tipperary. Furthermore, Dunne only lasted seven minutes on the field as he was shown a straight red card for a wild pull on Tommy Walsh.

In 2010 Tipperary were regarded as being the second best team in the country once again. Their first championship assignment was a clash with Cork in Páirc Uí Chaoimh. While Tipp were the favourites going into the game Cork ambushed Dunne's side with a 3–15 to 0–14 defeat. The qualifiers beckoned and, after victories over Wexford, Offaly, Galway and Waterford, Tipperary reached a second consecutive All-Ireland final. Kilkenny, a team chasing a fifth successive championship, provided the opposition and a great game was expected. Tipperary got off to a great start as Kilkenny's star forward Henry Shefflin had to leave the field with an injury. A hat-trick of goals by Lar Corbett and a fourth by Noel McGrath denied Kilkenny's drive-for-five and secured a remarkable 4–17 to 1–18 victory. Dunne made up for the disappointment of the previous year by coming on as a sub and chipping in with a key point. It was his first All-Ireland winners' medal.

In October 2011 Dunne announced his retirement from inter-county hurling.

== Honours ==
=== Tipperary ===
- All-Ireland Senior Hurling Championship:
  - Winner (1): 2010
  - Runner-up (2): 2009, 2011
- Munster Senior Hurling Championship:
  - Winner (3): 2008, 2009, 2011
  - Runner-up (3): 2002, 2005, 2006
- National Hurling League:
  - Winner (1): 2008
  - Runner-up (2): 2003, 2009

Sporting positions
Preceded by Tommy Dunne	Tipperary Senior Hurling Captain; 2005	Succeeded by Ger O'Grady
Preceded by Lar Corbett	Tipperary Senior Hurling Captain; 2007	Succeeded by Eoin Kelly
