= Séamus Callanan =

Irish hurler (born 1988)

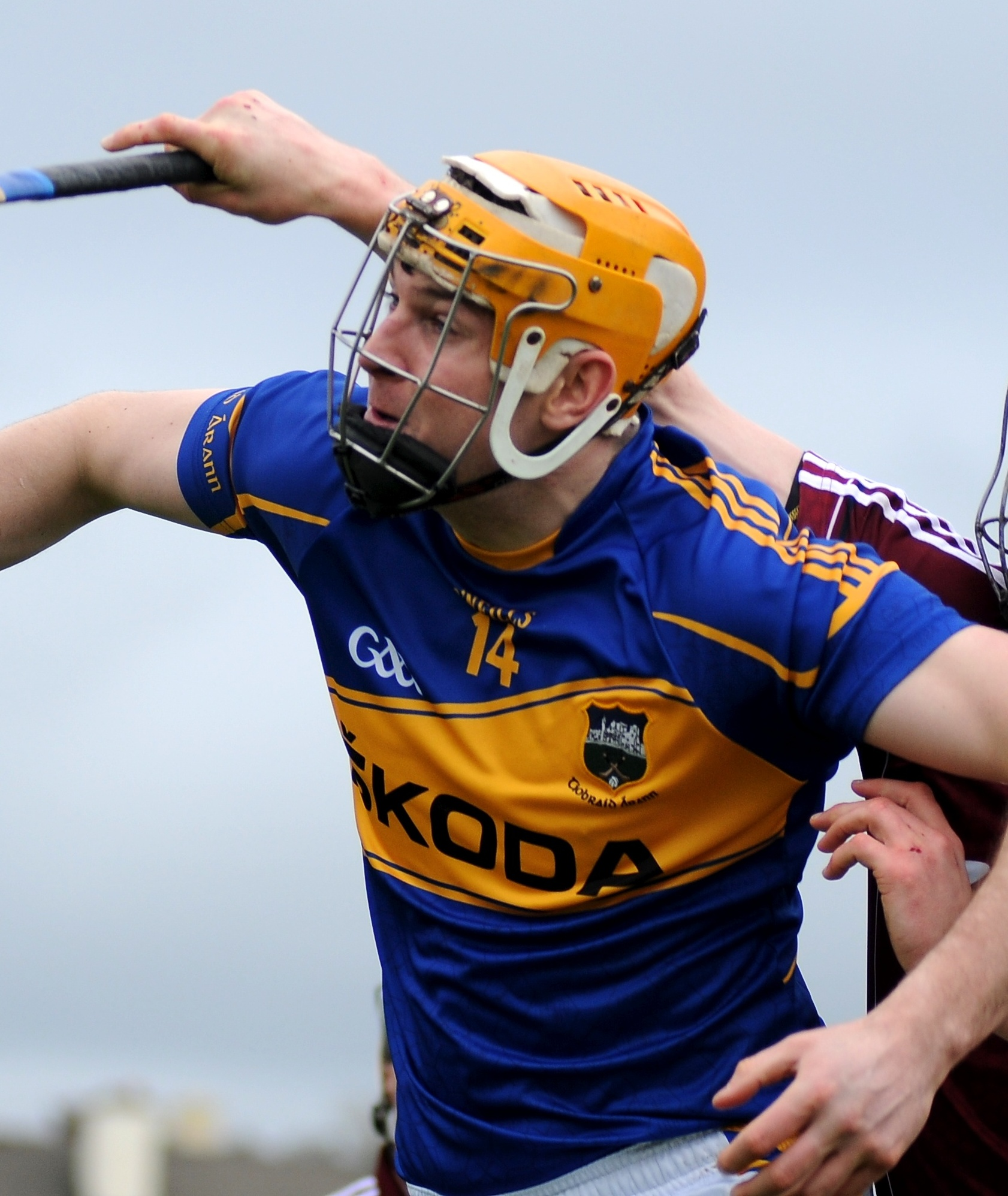
- Callanan in 2014

Personal information
- Native name: Séamus Ó Callanáin (Irish)
- Nickname: Séamie
- Born: 15 September 1988 (age 38) Drom, County Tipperary, Ireland
- Occupation: Sales representative
- Height: 1.91 m (6 ft 3 in)

Sport
- Sport: Hurling
- Position: Full-forward
Club
- Years: Club
- 2005–present: Drom & Inch
Club titles
- Tipperary titles: 1
College
- Years: College
- 2009–2013: Limerick Institute of Technology
College titles
- Fitzgibbon titles: 0
Inter-county*
Years	County	Apps (scores)
2008–2023	Tipperary	66 (40–226)
Inter-county titles
- Munster titles: 6
- All-Irelands: 3
- NHL: 1
- All Stars: 4
- *Inter County team apps and scores correct as of match played 28 May 2023.

Séamus Callanan (born 15 September 1988) is an Irish hurler who plays for Tipperary Senior Championship club Drom & Inch and is a former All-Ireland winning captain of the Tipperary senior hurling team. Often considered one of the best players of the current generation, Callanan has been a four-time nominee for Hurler of the Year, winning the award in 2019, and has won four All-Stars. He has won ten major trophies in his inter-county career, including three All-Ireland Championships, six Munster Championships and one National League. A prolific goalscorer, Callanan holds the Tipperary and All-Ireland record for most championship goals scored (40). He has scored 63 career goals overall in 126 league and championship appearances.

Born and raised in Drom, County Tipperary, Callanan began his hurling career with the Drom & Inch club. He joined the club's senior team as a 16-year-old in 2005 and enjoyed his first success, a Mid Tipperary Championship, in 2006. Over the next three years he won a further two divisional championship titles before captaining the club to their first Tipperary Senior Championship in 2011. Callanan added three more divisional championship titles to his collection in 2013, 2014 and 2019.

Callanan has lined out for Tipperary in three different grades of hurling over a 13-year period. After making his first appearance for the minor team in April 2006, he ended the year by sharing in the All-Ireland Championship success. Two years with the under-21 team, yielded a Munster Championship title in 2008. Callanan made his competitive debut for the senior team aged 19 in 2008. His debut season yielded National League and Munster Championship titles. The following four seasons saw Callanan win three more Munster Championships as well as his first All-Ireland Championship in 2010. Further Munster Championships were claimed in 2014, when he was the championship's top scorer, and 2015 before winning a second All-Ireland Championship as man of the match in 2016 and a third All-Ireland Championship as captain of the team in 2019. This period also saw Callanan be presented with four All-Stars in six seasons and receive four nominations for Hurler of the Year.

== Ancestry ==
One of Callanan's grandmothers is from Downings on the Rosguill peninsula of County Donegal. He has other family nearby, including in Dunfanaghy, Fanad, Letterkenny, Milford, Portsalon and Ramelton.

== Playing career ==
=== St. Joseph's College ===
Callanan first came to prominence as a hurler with St. Joseph's College in Borrisoleigh. He played in every grade before eventually joining the senior hurling team and lined out in several campaigns including a Munster b title win in 2006.

=== Limerick Institute of Technology ===
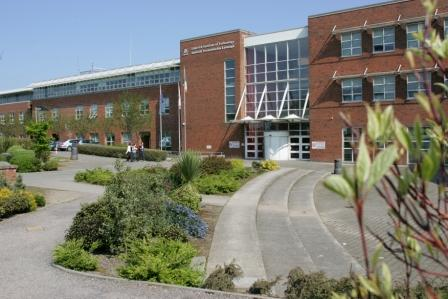
Limerick Institute of Technology.

During his studies at the Limerick Institute of Technology, Callanan was selected for the institute's senior hurling team during his second year. He lined out as a forward in several Fitzgibbon Cup campaigns.

=== Drom & Inch ===
Callanan joined the Drom & Inch club at a young age and played in all grades at juvenile and underage levels. He was still eligible for the minor team when he was drafted onto the club's senior team.

On 16 October 2005, Callanan was just 17-years-old when he was selected at left corner-forward for Drom & Inch's Tipperary Senior Championship final meeting with Thurles Sarsfields. He was held scoreless from play and substituted in the 49th minute as Drom & Inch suffered a 1–17 to 0–15 defeat.

Drom & Inch qualified for the Mid Tipperary Championship final on 30 August 2006, with Callanan starting the game on the bench. He was introduced as a substitute for Séamus Butler and scored 1-02 from play in the 3–13 to 0–16 defeat of Boherlahan-Dualla.

On 21 October 2007, Callanan lined out in his second Tipperary Senior Championship final in two years when Drom & Inch faced Loughmore-Castleiney. He top scored for the team with 0-05, however, Drom & Inch suffered a 0–22 to 0–13 defeat.

Callanan lined out at centre-forward when Drom & Inch qualified to play reigning champions Thurles Sarsfields in the Mid Tipperary Championship final on 31 August 2008. He top scored with 1–06 in a man of the match display and claimed a second winners' medal following the 2–19 to 0–21 victory.

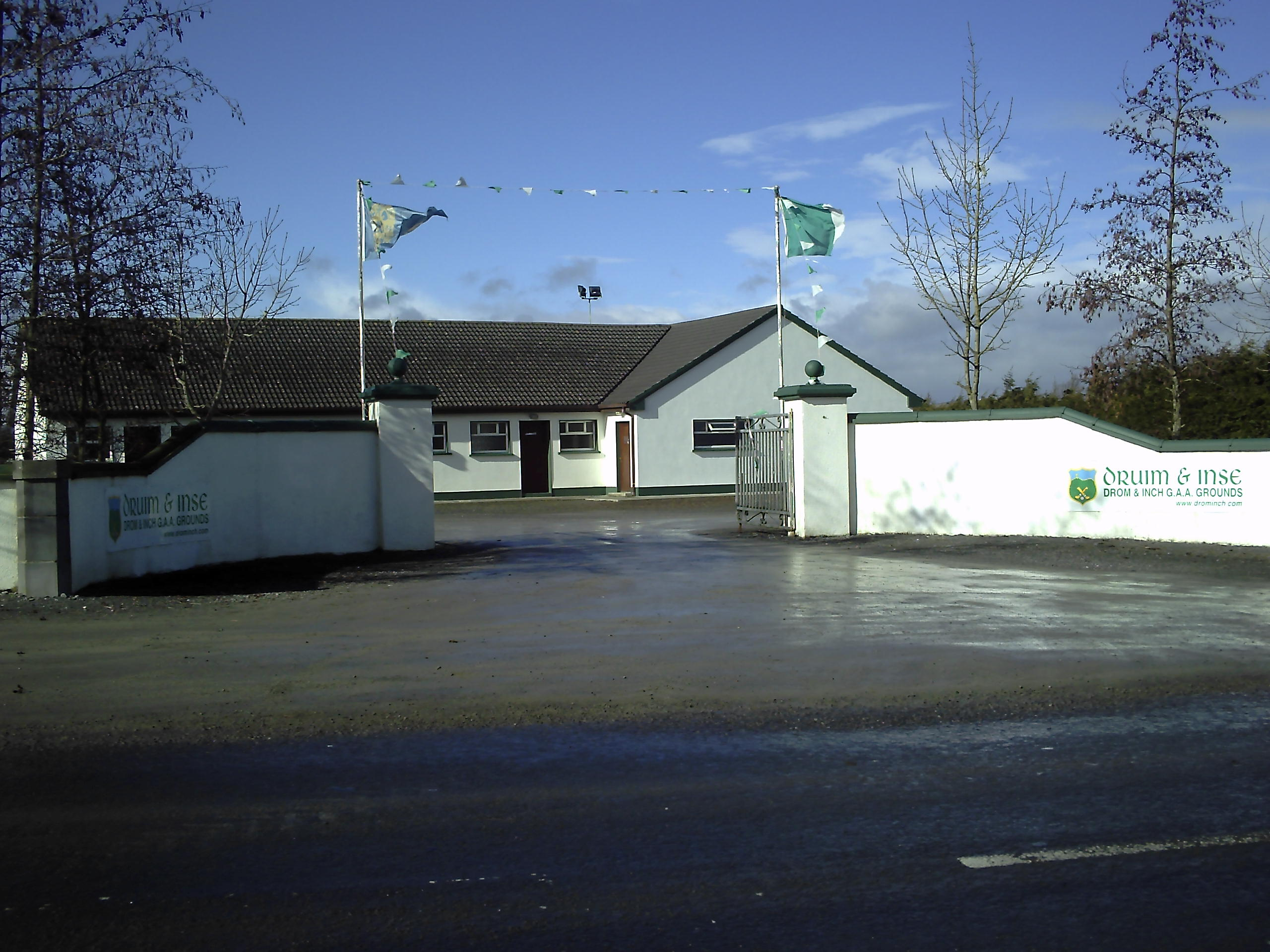
The Drom-Inch clubhouse.

On 23 August 2009, Callanan lined out in a second successive Mid Tipperary Championship final. He ended the game with a third winners' medal in four years after a 2–11 to 0–14 defeat of Upperchurch-Drombane. On 18 October 2009, Callanan lined out in a second Tipperary Senior Championship final. He scored two points, including a free, in the 0–14 to 0–05 defeat by Thurles Sarsfields.

Callanan was captain of the Drom & Inch team that faced Clonoulty-Rossmore in the Tipperary Senior Championship final on 16 October 2011. He top scored with 0-06 and collected a winners' medal after a 1–19 to 2–14 victory.

On 14 October 2012, Callanan lined out in a fifth Tipperary Senior Championship final when Drom & Inch had the opportunity to retain the title. He scored 1-03 but ended the game on the losing side after a 1–21 to 2–15 defeat by Thurles Sarsfields.

Drom & Inch qualified for a Mid Tipperary Championship final meeting with Loughmore-Castleiney on 11 August 2013. Callanan collected a fourth winners' medal after top scoring with 1-12 from full-forward in the 3–20 to 1–11 victory.

On 14 September 2014, Callanan lined out at full-forward when Drom & Inch reached a second successive Mid Tipperary Championship final. He ended the game with a fifth winners' medal after a 1–16 to 1–15 defeat of Upperchurch Drombane for the second year in-a-row.

On 29 September 2019, Callanan collected a sixth Mid Tipperary Championship winners' medal, following a 2–19 to 1-21 AET defeat of Upperchurch Drombane in Littleton.

=== Tipperary ===
==== Minor and under-21 ====
Callanan first played for Tipperary as a 17-year-old when he joined the minor team during the 2006 Munster Championship. He made his first appearance for the team on 5 April 2006 and scored a point from left wing-forward in a 2–13 to 1–08 defeat of Clare. Callanan was switched to right corner-forward for the Munster final against Cork 25 June 2006. He was held scoreless from and substituted in the 2–20 to 1–15 defeat. On 3 September 2006, Callanan was selected on the substitutes' bench when Tipperary faced Galway in the All-Ireland final. He was introduced as a substitute for Tony Dunne at full-forward and ended the game with a winners' medal following the 2–18 to 2–07 victory.

Callanan was drafted onto the Tipperary under-21 team in advance of the 2008 Munster Championship. He made his first appearance for the team on 17 July 2008 when he lined out at centre-forward in a 1–13 to 0–15 defeat of Limerick. On 30 July 2008, Callanan won a Munster Championship medal after scoring 1-05 from left wing-forward in a controversial 1–16 to 2–12 defeat of Clare in the final. He was switched to the centre-forward position when Tipperary suffered a 2–13 to 0–15 defeat by Kilkenny in the All-Ireland final on 14 September 2008.

Callanan was again eligible for the under-21 grade for a second and final season in 2009. He made his last appearance in the grade on 15 July 2009 when he scored a point from centre-forward in a 3–21 to 2–14 defeat by Waterford.

==== Senior ====
Callanan joined the Tipperary senior team in 2008 prior to the start of the 2008 National League. He made his first appearance for the team on 10 February 2008 when he came on as a 48th-minute substitute for Ryan O'Dwyer and scored three points in a 2–25 to 2–08 defeat of Offaly. On 20 April 2008, Callanan was named on the bench when Tipperary faced Galway in the National League final. He came on as a 55th-minute substitute and claimed a winners' medal after the 3–18 to 3–16 victory. On 13 July 2008, Callanan was selected at centre-forward when Tipperary qualified to play Clare in the Munster final. He scored 1-03 from play and claimed his first Munster Championship medal after a 2–21 to 0–19 victory. Callanan ended his debut season by receiving an All-Star nomination.

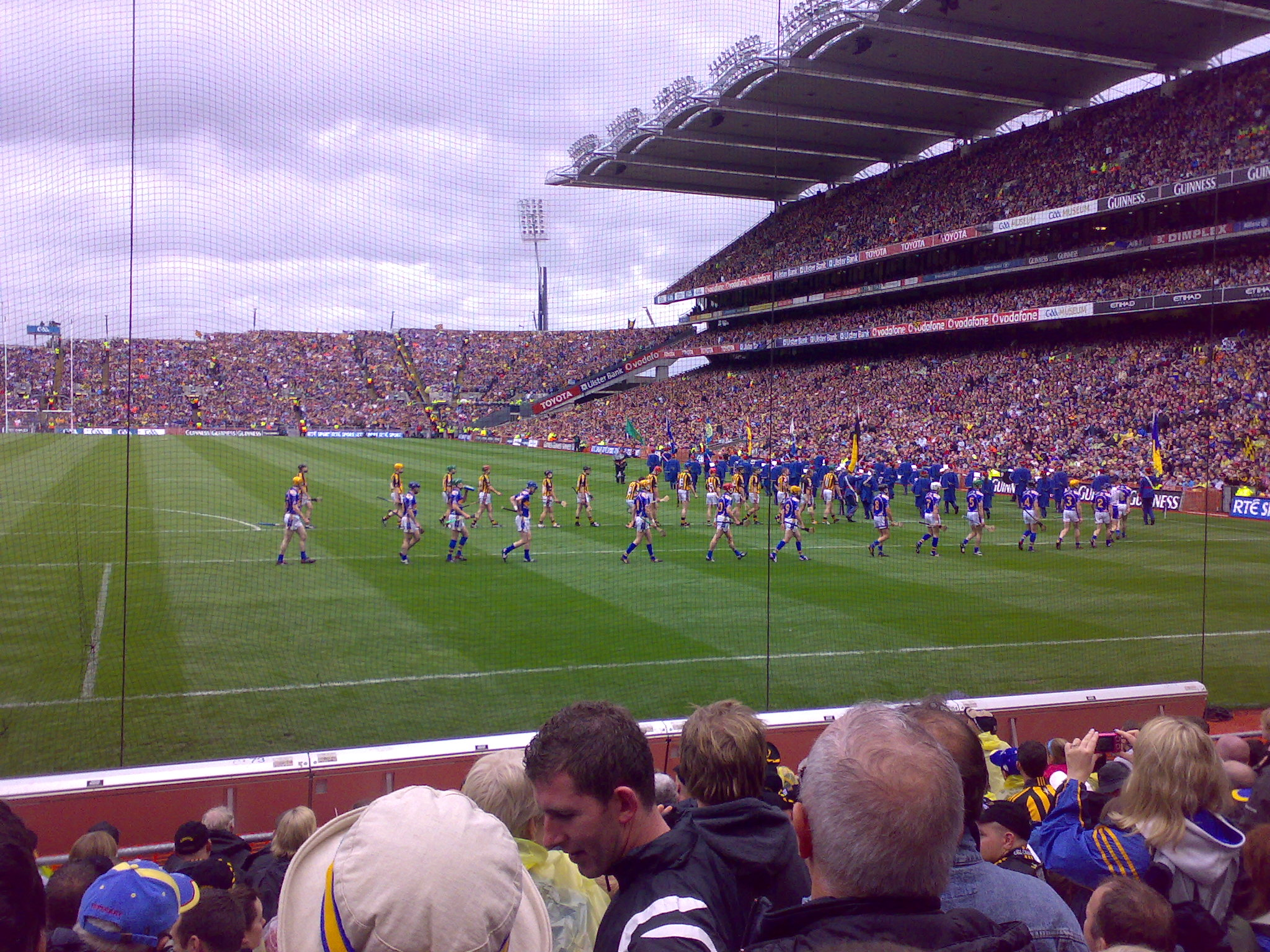
The Kilkenny and Tipperary teams parade before the 2009 All-Ireland final at Croke Park.

On 3 May 2009, Callanan lined out in a second successive National League final when Tipperary faced Kilkenny. He top scored for the team with 1-07 from centre-forward but ended on the losing side after a 2–26 to 4-17 extra-time defeat. On 12 July 2009, Callanan started the Munster final at centre-forward. He ended the game with a second successive winners' medal after scoring 1–01 in the 4–14 to 2–16 defeat of Waterford. Callanan was again selected at centre-forward for the All-Ireland final against Kilkenny on 6 September 2009. He scored three points from play but ended the game on the losing side following a 2–22 to 0–23 defeat. Callanan ended the season by receiving a second consecutive All-Star nomination.

On 5 September 2010, Callanan failed to secure a place on the starting fifteen when Tipperary qualified to play Kilkenny in a second successive All-Ireland final. He scored two points from play after coming on as a substitute for John O'Brien and collected his first All-Ireland medal following a 4–17 to 1–18 victory. McGrath ended the season by winning a second All-Star award.

On 10 July 2011, Callanan won a third Munster Championship medal after scoring a goal from centre-forward in a 7–19 to 0–19 defeat of Waterford in the Munster final. On 4 September 2011, he was switched to right wing-forward when Tipperary faced Kilkenny in a third successive All-Ireland final in a 2–17 to 1–16 defeat.

On 15 July 2012, Callanan was selected amongst the substitutes when Tipperary qualified to play Waterford in a second successive Munster final. He came on as a substitute for Noel McGrath at left corner-forward and ended the game with a fourth winners' medal in five seasons after a 2–17 to 0–16 victory.

On 5 May 2013, Callanan was selected at left corner-forward when Tipperary faced Kilkenny in the National League final. He scored two points from play but ended on the losing side following a 2–17 to 0–20 defeat.

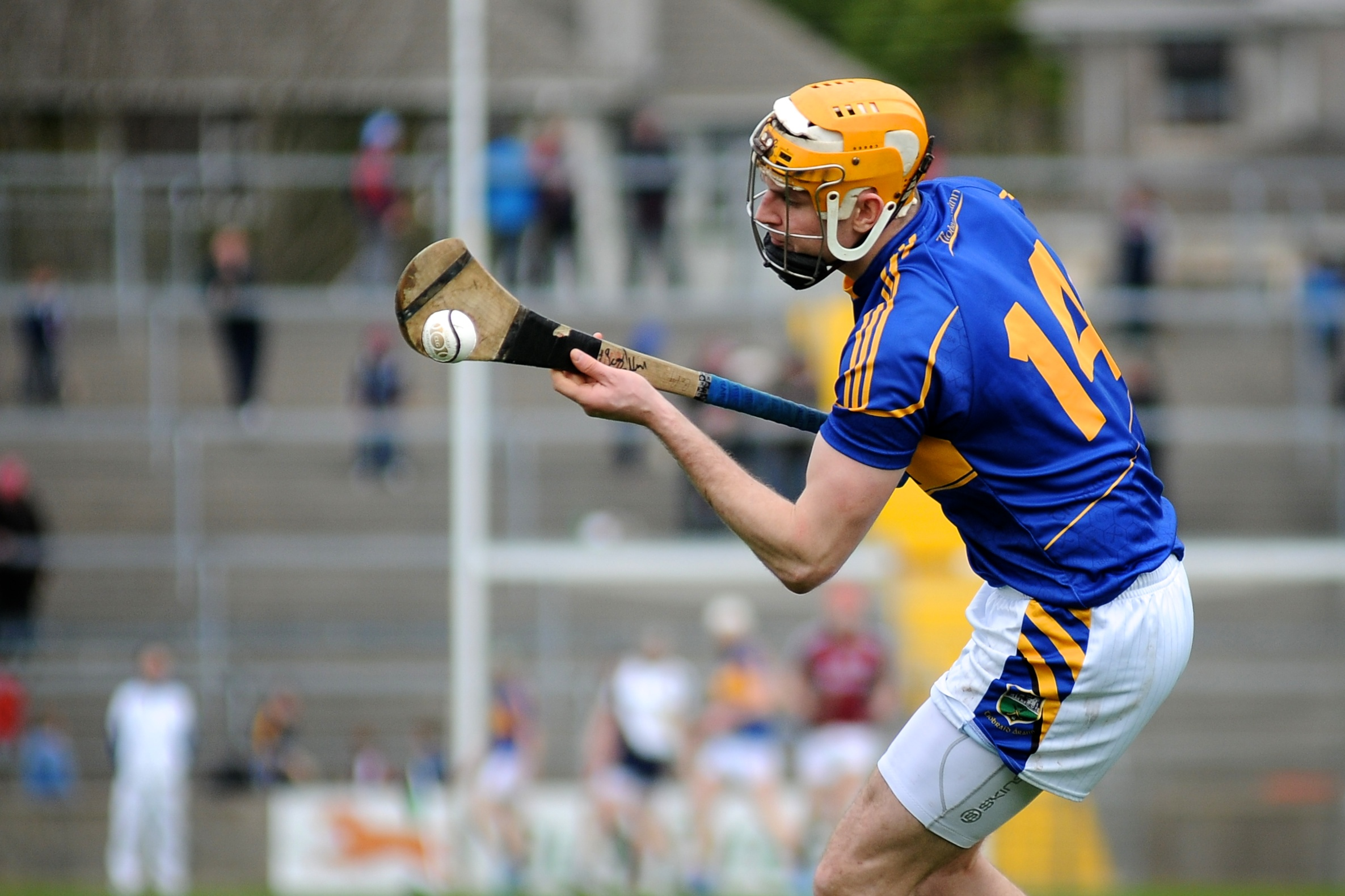
Séamus Callanan in 2014.

Callanan lined out at full-forward in a second successive National League final against Kilkenny on 4 May 2014. He top scored for Tipperary with 0–09 in the 2–25 to 1–27 defeat. Callanan ended the league as top scorer with 5-62. On 7 September 2014, Callanan scored seven points from full-forward in a 1–28 to 3–22 draw with Kilkenny in the All-Ireland final. He retained his position on the starting fifteen for the replay on 27 September 2014, however, he ended the game on the losing side in spite of top scoring with 2–05 in the 2–17 to 2–14 defeat. Callanan ended the season as the championship's top scorer with 9-50. He also received his first All-Star award but lost out to Richie Hogan in the race to be named Hurler of the Year.

On 12 July 2015, Callanan was at full-forward when Tipperary qualified for a Munster final appearance against Waterford. He scored six points and ended the game with a fifth winners' medal following the 0–21 to 0–16 victory. On 16 August 2015, Callanan started against Galway in the semi-final of the 2015 All-Ireland Championship at Croke Park. Callanan scored 3-9 (3-4 from play) during the game to win the man of the match award but Galway won the game with a late point. Callanan finished the season by being nominated for Hurler of the Year, however, he lost out for the second year in succession with T. J. Reid taking the accolade. He also received a second successive All-Star award.

Callanan claimed a sixth Munster Championship medal on 10 July 2016 after top scoring with 1-11 from full-forward in a 5–19 to 0–13 defeat of Waterford in the final. On 5 September 2016, he retained his position at full-forward for the All-Ireland final against Kilkenny. Callanan top scored with 0-13 and collected a second All-Ireland medal following a 2–29 to 2–20 victory. He was also named as the man of the match. Callanan ended the season by receiving a third successive All-Star award, however, he was also overlooked for the Hurler of the Year title for the third successive year.

On 29 November 2016, Callanan was appointed vice-captain of the Tipperary senior team for the 2017 season. On 16 April 2017, he broke his thumb in Tipperary's National League semi-final defeat of Wexford, an injury which ruled him out of the final. On 14 January 2018, Callanan suffered another injury setback when it was revealed that he would miss the National League with a disc problem.

On 22 January 2019, Callanan was named as the captain of the Tipperary senior team for the 2019 season. On 2 June 2019, he became Tipperary's highest championship goal-scorer in history when he scored his 30th goal in the 3–21 to 0–17 defeat of Clare in the Munster Championship. On 30 June 2019, Callanan scored 1-01 from full-forward when Tipperary suffered a 2–26 to 2–14 defeat by Limerick in the Munster final.

On 18 August 2019, Callanan captained Tipperary to win the 2019 All-Ireland Final against Kilkenny. He scored 1–2 in the game to keep up his record of scoring a goal in every championship game during the year, eight in total.

On 1 November 2019, Callanan was named as the 2019 Hurler of the Year and also picked up his fourth All Star award.

Callanan returned to the Tipperary team in 2023 after missing the 2022 championship due to a finger injury. He made five appearances in the 2023 Championship scoring 1-05 including his 40th goal in the championship against Offaly on the 17 June 2023. His 66th and final inter-county appearance came a week later in the All-Ireland quarter-final defeat to Galway. On 6 September 2023, Callanan announced his retirement from inter-county hurling after 16 years.

=== Munster ===
Callanan has also lined out with Munster in the Inter-provincial Championship. On 11 December 2016, Callanan scored 1–7 against Ulster in the 2016 GAA Interprovincial Championships semi-final.

== Career statistics ==
As of match played 24 June 2023

Team	Year	National League			Munster		All-Ireland		Total	
Team	Year	Division	Apps	Score	Apps	Score	Apps	Score	Apps	Score
Tipperary	2008	Division 1B	5	1-07	2	1-06	1	1-03	8	3-16
Tipperary	2009	Division 1	6	2-34	3	3-04	2	0-06	11	5-44
Tipperary	2010	Division 1	5	1-08	1	0-01	5	1-03	11	2-12
Tipperary	2011	Division 1	0	0-00	3	2-10	2	0-01	5	2-11
Tipperary	2012	Division 1A	0	0-00	2	0-01	0	0-00	2	0-01
Tipperary	2013	Division 1A	7	1-27	1	0-04	1	0-02	9	1-33
Tipperary	2014	Division 1A	7	5-62	1	0-05	6	9-45	14	14-112
Tipperary	2015	Division 1A	7	3-45	2	2-11	1	3-09	10	8-65
Tipperary	2016	Division 1A	2	0-04	3	2-25	2	0-22	7	2-51
Tipperary	2017	Division 1A	5	4-34	1	0-06	4	3-28	10	7-68
Tipperary	2018	Division 1A	—		4	0-05	—		4	0-05
Tipperary	2019	Division 1A	6	3-29	5	5-12	3	3-06	14	11-46
Tipperary	2020	Division 1A	4	1-04	1	0-00	2	1-04	7	2-08
Tipperary	2021	Division 1A	2	1-02	2	1-02	1	2-00	5	4-04
Tipperary	2022	Division 1A	3	0-00	—		—		3	0-00
Tipperary	2023	Division 1A	3	0-00	3	0-05	2	1-00	8	1-05
Total			62	23-256	34	16-97	32	24-129	126	63-482

== Honours ==
=== Team ===
Drom & Inch

- Tipperary Senior Hurling Championship (1): 2011 (c)
- Mid Tipperary Senior Hurling Championship (6): 2006, 2008, 2009, 2013, 2014, 2019
- Tipperary Intermediate Football Championship (2): 2014, 2021

Tipperary

- All-Ireland Senior Hurling Championship (3): 2010, 2016, 2019 (c)
- Munster Senior Hurling Championship (6): 2008, 2009, 2011, 2012, 2015, 2016
- National Hurling League (1): 2008
- Munster Under-21 Hurling Championship (1): 2008
- All-Ireland Minor Hurling Championship (1): 2006

Munster

- Railway Cup (1): 2016

Individual

- GAA/GPA Hurler of the Year (1): 2019
- GAA/GPA All-Stars Awards (4): 2014, 2015, 2016, 2019
- All-Ireland Senior Hurling Championship Top Scorer (1): 2014
- GPA/GAA Player of the Month (2): August 2015, September 2016
- All-Ireland Senior Hurling Championship Final Man of the Match (1): 2016
- The Sunday Game Team of the Year (4): 2014, 2015, 2016, 2019
- The Sunday Game Hurler of the Year (2): 2016, 2019
- In May 2020, a public poll conducted by RTÉ.ie named Callanan in the full-forward line alongside Eoin Kelly and Nicky English in a team of hurlers who had won All Stars during the era of The Sunday Game.

Awards
Preceded by Michael Fennelly	All-Ireland Senior Hurling Final; Man of the Match; 2016	Succeeded by Daithí Burke
Preceded by Declan Hannon	All-Ireland Senior Hurling Final winning captain 2019	Succeeded by Declan Hannon
Preceded by Cian Lynch	GAA/GPA All-Stars Hurler of the Year; 2019	Succeeded by Gearóid Hegarty
Sporting positions
Preceded by Pádraic Maher	Tipperary Senior Hurling Captain; 2019-2021	Succeeded by Ronan Maher
