= 2008 Tipperary county hurling team season =

Tipperary county hurling team
2008 season
Manager	Liam Sheedy
All-Ireland SHC	Semi-finalists
Munster SHC	Winners
National League	Winners
Top scorer SHC	Eoin Kelly (1-21)
Highest SHC attendance	53,635 (v Waterford 17 August)
Lowest SHC attendance	42,823 (v Cork 8 June)
Standard colours

The 2008 season was Liam Sheedy's first season in charge of the Tipperary senior hurling team. He was appointed for a one-year term at a meeting of the county board on 25 September 2007. Paul Ormond was the team captain for the year but Eoin Kelly was the playing captain when Ormond wasn't named in the team.

On 27 January, Tipperary won the pre-season Waterford Crystal Cup for the second year in a row after a 3–13 to 1–13 defeat of Waterford. During the National League, Tipperary recorded three wins and two draws to finish second in Division 1B and secure a place in the knock-out stages. Subsequent defeats of Waterford and Kilkenny saw Tipperary qualify for the final in which they defeated Galway by 3–18 to 3–16 to take the title for the 19th time.

In the Munster Championship, Tipperary recorded their first defeat of Cork in Cork since 1923, before winning the Munster title following a 2–21 to 0–19 defeat of Clare in the final. Tipperary's went on to play Waterford in the All-Ireland semi-final where they lost by two points, it was there only defeat of the year.

Liam Sheedy was reappointment as manager for another term in October 2008.

== 2008 senior hurling management team ==
Name	Position	Club
Liam Sheedy	Manager	Portroe
Eamon O'Shea	Selector	Kilruane MacDonagh's
Michael Ryan	Selector	Upperchurch-Drombane
Cian O'Neill	Selector	Moorefield

=== 2008 squad ===
The following players made their competitive senior debut in 2008.

- Séamus Callanan against Offaly on 10 February.
- Pat Kerwick against Offaly on 10 February.
- Paddy Stapleton against Limerick 17 February.

== 2008 National Hurling League ==
=== Division 1B table ===
Pos	Team	Pld	W	D	L	Diff	Pts	Notes
1	Galway	5	3	2	0	+51	8	Division 1 runners-up
2	Tipperary	5	3	2	0	+42	8	Division 1 champions
3	Limerick	5	3	0	2	+16	6	
4	Clare	5	2	1	2	–1	5	
5	Laois	5	1	0	4	–74	2	Relegated to Division 2
6	Offaly	5	0	1	4	–34	1	Relegated to Division 2

10 February 2008 Round 1	Tipperary	2-25 - 2-8	Offaly	Semple Stadium
	E Kelly 1-10, P Kerwick 1-1, L Corbett 0-3, P Bourke 0-3, S Callinan 0-3, S Butler 0-2, R O'Dwyer 0-1, J O'Brien 0-1, W Ryan 0-1.	Report	D Molloy 1-1, D Murray 1-0, S Dooley 0-3, J Rigney 0-2, B Carroll 0-1, C Mahon 0-1.	Attendance: 3,294; Referee: J Owens (Wexford)

17 February 2008 Round 2	Tipperary	2-20 - 2-9	Limerick	Semple Stadium
	E Kelly 1-12, S Callinan 1-1, C O'Mahony 0-2, S McGrath 0-2, S Butler 0-1, R O'Dwyer 0-1, J Woodlock 0-1.	Report	A O'Shaughnessy 2-3, P Tobin 0-3, H Flavin 0-1, P O'Dwyer 0-1, A O'Connor 0-1.	Referee: D Kirwan (Cork)

9 March 2008 Round 3	Galway	0-16 - 0-16	Tipperary	Pearse Stadium
	K Wade 0-6, G Farragher 0-3, N Healy 0-2, A Cullinane 0-1, A Callanan 0-1, D Forde 0-1, K Hynes 0-1, G Mahon 0-1.	Report	C O'Mahony 0-5, E Kelly 0-4, S McGrath 0-2, J O'Brien 0-2, S Butler 0-1, H Moloney 0-1, P Kerwick 0-1.	Referee: É Morris (Dublin)

16 March 2008 Round 4	Clare	0-17 - 1-14	Tipperary	Cusack Park
	M Flaherty 0-10, F Lynch 0-2, D O'Rourke 0-2, C Lynch 0-1, J Clancy 0-1, D Barrett 0-1.	Report	E Kelly 0-6, T Fitzgerald 1-0, J Woodlock 0-3, S McGrath 0-1, D Egan 0-1, J O'Brien 0-1, S Butler 0-1, W Ryan 0-1.	Referee: M Wadding (Waterford)

23 March 2008 Round 5	Tipperary	4-17 - 1-12	Laois	Leahy Park
	L Corbett 3-2, T Fitzgerald 1-0, P Bourke 0-3, P Kerwick 0-3, S Butler 0-3, C O'Mahony 0-1, S Maher 0-1, J Woodlock 0-1, J Ceaser 0-1, D Hickey 0-1, S McGrath 0-1.	Report	J Young 0-5, T Fitzgerald 1-0, Z Keenan 0-3, W Hyland 0-2, J Rowney 0-1, M Whelan 0-1.

Quarter-finals

6 April 2008 Quarter-final	Tipperary	1-16 - 0-14	Waterford	Nowlan Park, Kilkenny
	E Kelly (0-10, seven frees, one 65), S Butler (1-1), E Corcoran (0-1, line ball), C O'Mahony (0-1, free), S McGrath (0-1), L Corbett (0-1), S Callinan 0-1.	Report	D Bennett (0-8, six frees), E McGrath (0-1), K McGrath (0-1, free), S Prendergast (0-1), S O'Sullivan (0-1), J Mullane (0-1), S Casey (0-1).	Referee: B Gavin (Offaly)

Semi-finals

13 April 2008 Semi-Final	Kilkenny	1-10 – 1-15	Tipperary	Nowlan Park, Kilkenny
	M Fennelly; R Power (0-6, four frees), E Brennan (1-0), J Fitzpatrick (0-1, free), M Rice (0-1), R Hogan (0-1), A Fogarty (0-1).	Report	E Kelly (0-7, four frees, one 65), L Corbett (1-0), T Fitzgerald (0-2), S Callinan (0-2), E Corcoran (0-1), S McGrath (0-1), S Butler (0-1), R O'Dwyer (0-1).	Referee: M Wadding (Waterford)

Final

20 April 2008 Final	Tipperary	3-18 – 3-16	Galway	Gaelic Grounds, Limerick
4:15 p.m.	E Kelly 0-7 (0-5 frees); L Corbett 1-3; S Butler 0-6; W Ryan 1-1; B Dunne 1-0; S McGrath 0-1.	Report	J Canning 1-6 (0-4 frees); F Healy and A Callinan 1-0 each; D Hayes 0-4; K Hynes 0-3; R Murray, J Skehill (free) and G Farragher (free) 0-1 each.	Attendance: 16,315; Referee: B Kelly (Westmeath)

== 2008 Munster Senior Hurling Championship ==
8 June
Semi-final

Cork	1-13 - 1-19	Tipperary
B O'Connor 1-3 (2f), C Naughton 0-4, J O'Connor 0-2, S Óg Ó hAilpín, P O'Sullivan, T Kenny, B Corry 0-1 each.		E Kelly 1-7 (5f), L Corbett 0-4, S Callanan 0-3, E Corcoran (sl), W Ryan, S McGrath, P Kerwick, M Webster 0-1 each.

Páirc Uí Chaoimh, Cork
Referee: B Kelly (Westmeath)
13 July
Final

Tipperary	2-21 - 0-19	Clare
J O'Brien 1-4, S Callanan 1-3, E Kelly 0-6 (2f), S McGrath 0-3, L Corbett 0-2, J Woodlock, P Kerwick, H Maloney 0-1 each.		N Gilligan 0-8 (5f), M Flaherty (3f), C Lynch 0-3 each, T Carmody 0-2, J Clancy, G Quinn, D McMahon 0-1 each.

Gaelic Grounds, Limerick
Attendance: 48,077
Referee: D Kirwan (Cork)

== 2008 All-Ireland Senior Hurling Championship ==
17 August
Semi-final

Tipperary	1-18 - 1-20	Waterford
E Kelly 0-8 (6f), S Callanan 1-3, S McGrath 0-3, C O’Mahony (1f), L Corbett, P Kerwick, S Maher 0-1 each.	Report	E Kelly 1-10 (8f), J Mullane 0-3, E McGrath, S Molumphy, M Walsh 0-2 each, J Kennedy 0-1.

Croke Park, Dublin
Attendance: 53,635
Referee: D Kirwan (Cork)

== Awards ==
Brendan Cummins, Conor O'Mahony, and Shane McGrath all won All Star Awards.
