= GAA/GPA Player of the Month (hurling) =

Gaelic games award

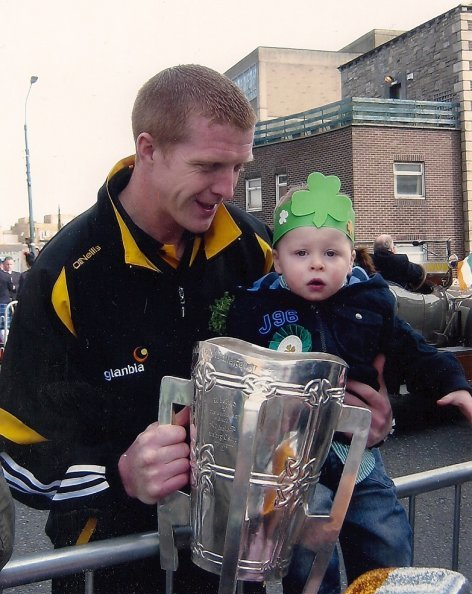
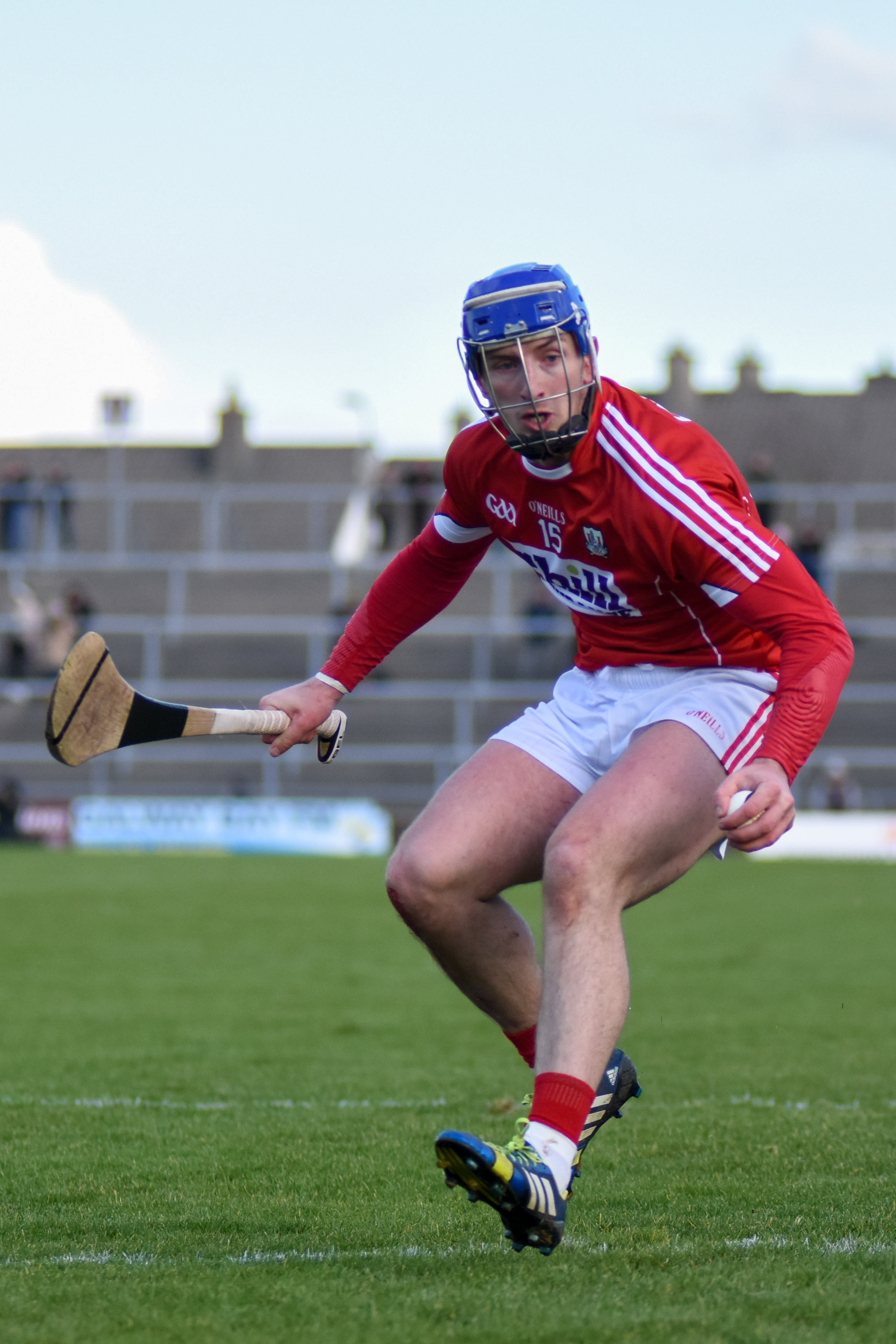
Henry Shefflin (left), Patrick Horgan (right) became the first players to win three Player of the Month awards.

The GAA/GPA Player of the Month is a Gaelic games award that recognises the best hurler each month of the All-Ireland Senior Hurling Championship. Each of the monthly award winners are selected by members of the Gaelic Players' Association from a shortlist nominated by an independent panel, made up of four former players. The awards scheme is officially known as the PwC GAA/GPA Player of the Month.

While Vodafone had sponsored the All-Stars monthly awards scheme, the Gaelic Players' Association introduced their own awards in 2006. These were sponsored by Opel. Both the All-Stars and the GPA awards merged in 2011. Mark Foley was the inaugural recipient in April 2006 for his "outstanding corner-back play" during Limerick's unbeaten run to the National Hurling League final.

Tony Kelly has been Player of the Month the most with five awards. Two players have won the award in consecutive months; John Mullane in 2009, and Ger Farragher in 2010. They, along with Patrick Horgan in 2019 and Shane O'Donnell in 2024, are also the only players to have won two awards in a single season.

As of April 2025, the most recent recipient of the award is corner-forward Brian Hayes who plays for Cork.

== Winners ==
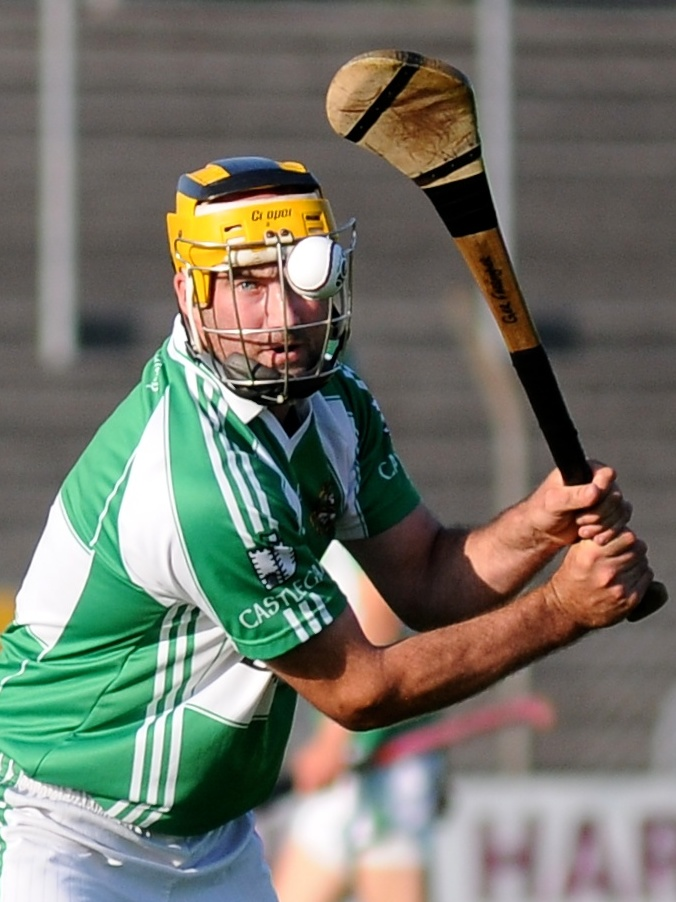
Ger Farragher, one of only two players to have won back-to-back awards.

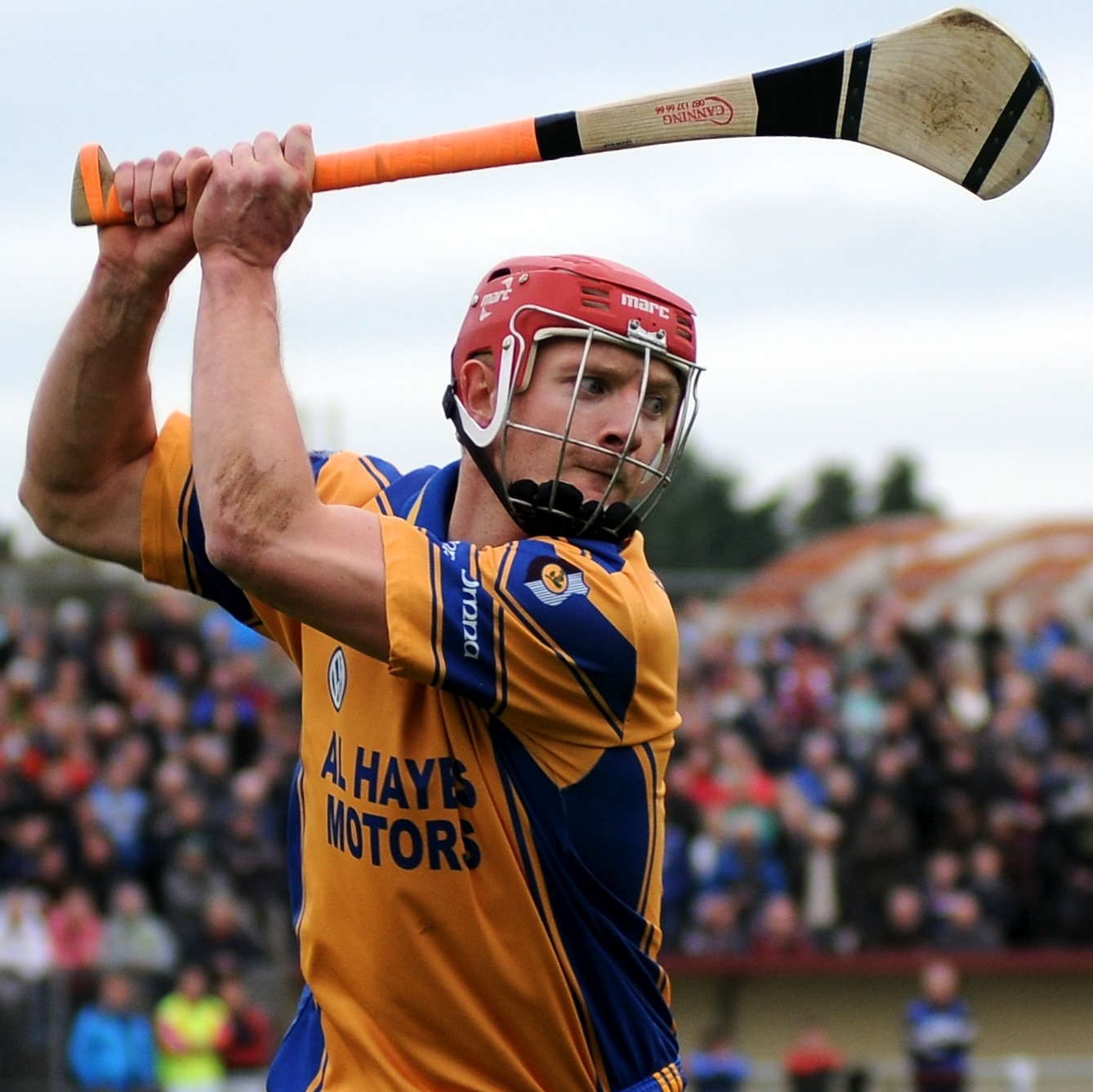
Joe Canning, a two-time award winner in 2008 and 2012.

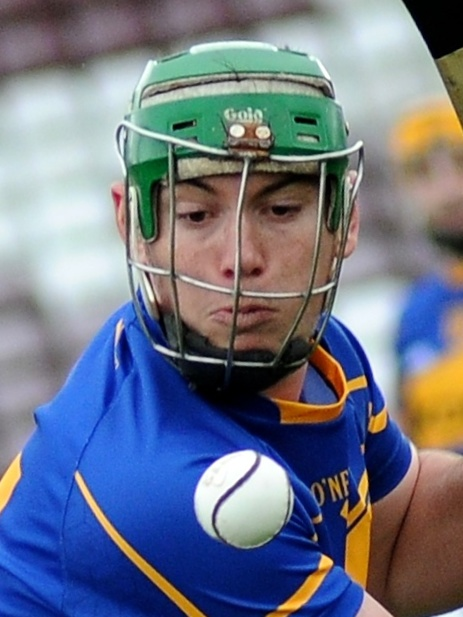
John "Bubbles" O'Dwyer won in June 2015.

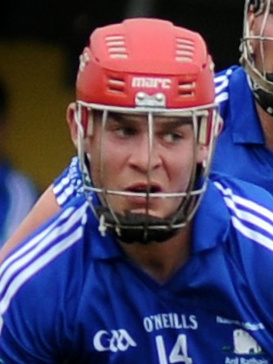
Jonathan Glynn won in July 2015.

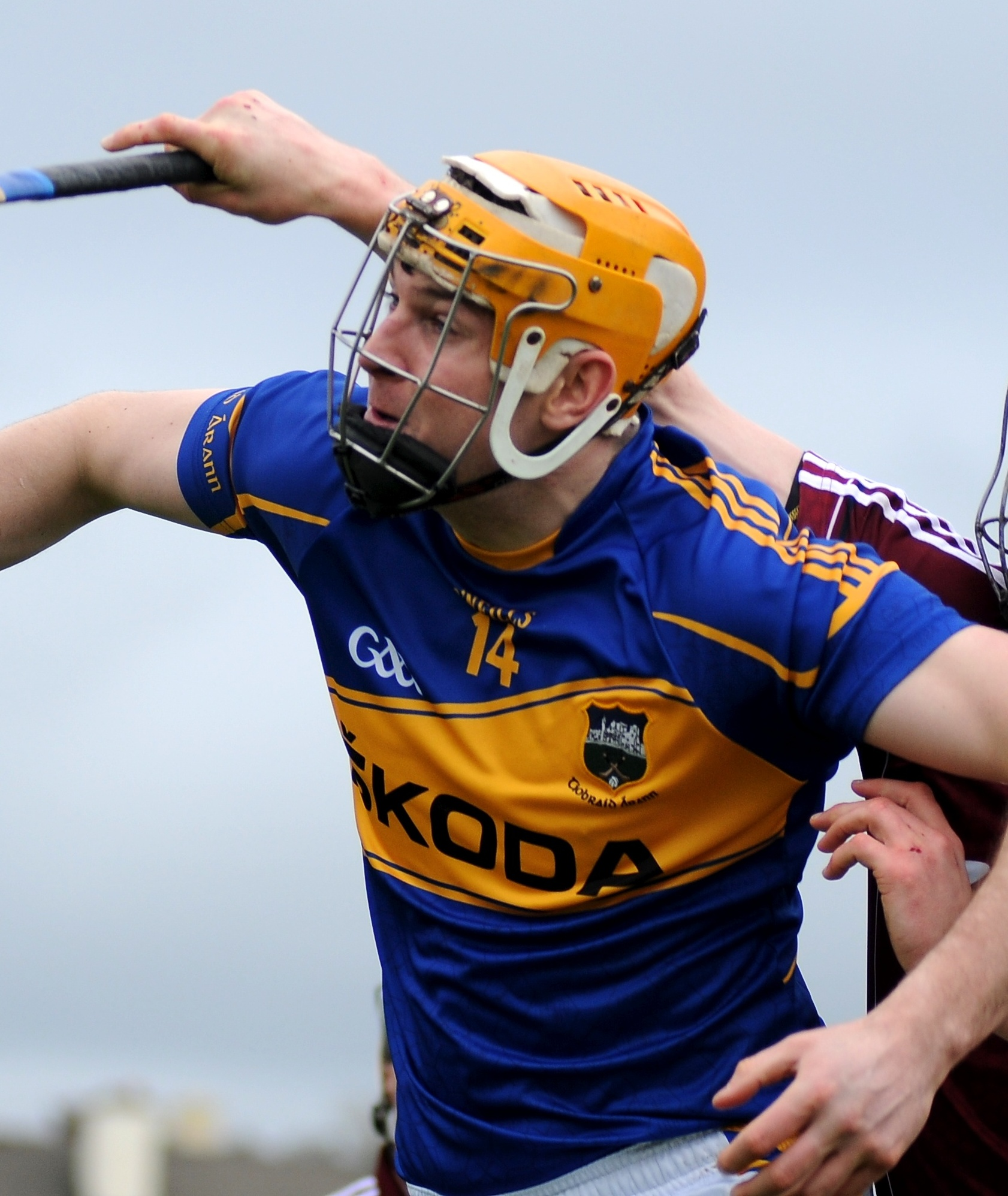
Séamus Callanan won in August 2015 and September 2016.

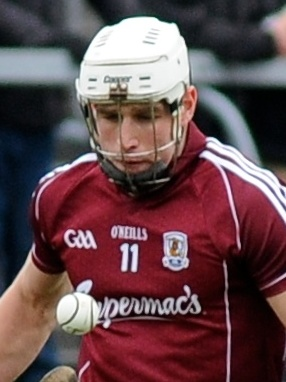
Gearóid McInerney won in September 2017.

Shane O'Donnell won in 2013, 2022 and 2024.

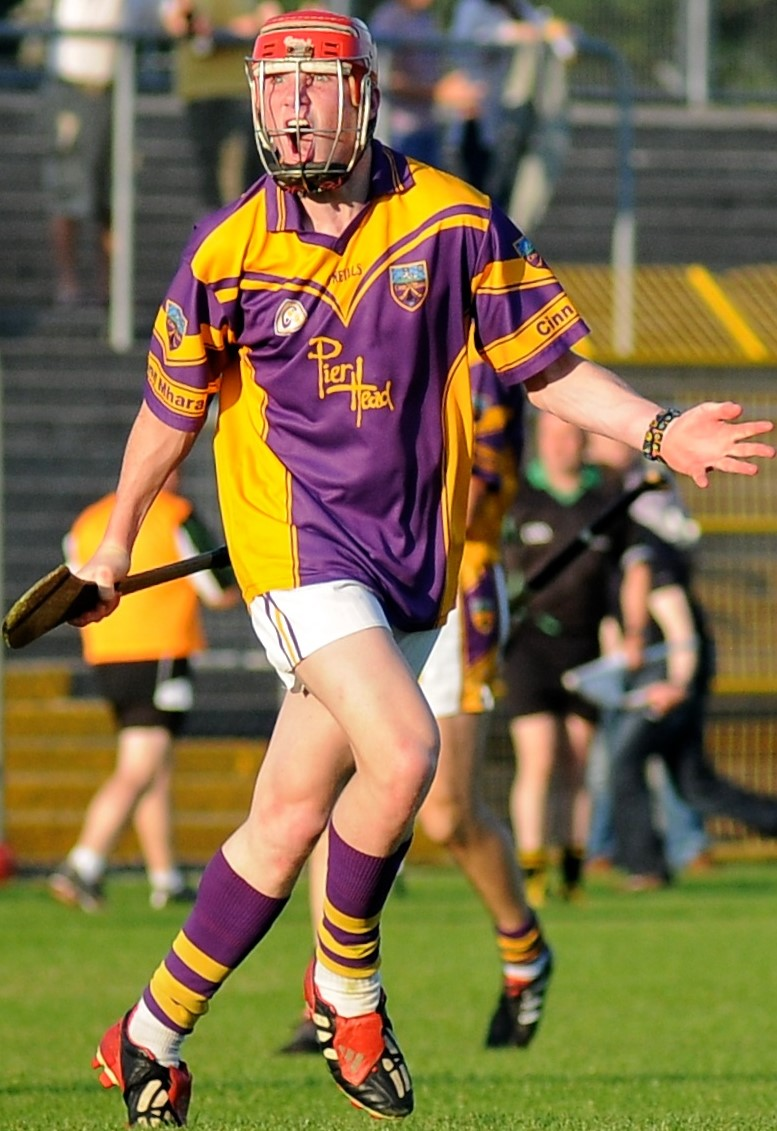
Conor Whelan won in 2023.

Month	Year	Player	County	Club	Position	Ref
April	2006	Mark Foley	Limerick	Adare	4	
May	2006	Eoin Kelly	Tipperary	Mullinahone	15	
June	2006	Joe Deane	Cork	Killeagh	15	
July	2006	Dan Shanahan	Waterford	Lismore	10	
August	2006	Henry Shefflin	Kilkenny	Ballyhale Shamrocks	14	
September	2006	James Fitzpatrick	Kilkenny	Ballyhale Shamrocks	9	
April	2007	Séamus Prendergast	Waterford	Ardmore	14	
May	2007	Ronan Curran	Cork	St. Finbarr's	6	
June	2007	Ollie Moran	Limerick	Ahane	11	
July	2007	Dan Shanahan	Waterford	Lismore	10	
August	2007	Andrew O'Shaughnessy	Limerick	Kilmallock	13	
September	2007	Eddie Brennan	Kilkenny	Graigue-Ballycallan	13	
April	2008	Shane McGrath	Tipperary	Ballinahinch	9	
May	2008	David O'Callaghan	Dublin	St. Mark's	13	
June	2008	Brian O'Connell	Clare	Wolfe Tones	8	
July	2008	Joe Canning	Galway	Portumna	14	
August	2008	Derek Lyng	Kilkenny	Emeralds	9	
September	2008	Eoin Larkin	Kilkenny	James Stephens	12	
April	2009	Alan McCrabbe	Dublin	Craobh Chiaráin	15	
May	2009	Eoin Cadogan	Cork	Douglas	3	
June	2009	John Mullane	Waterford	De La Salle	13	
July	2009	John Mullane	Waterford	De La Salle	13	
August	2009	Henry Shefflin	Kilkenny	Ballyhale Shamrocks	14	
September	2009	Tommy Walsh	Kilkenny	Tullaroan	5	
April	2010	Ger Farragher	Galway	Castlegar	8	
May	2010	Ger Farragher	Galway	Castlegar	8	
June	2010	Damien Hayes	Galway	Portumna	14	
July	2010	Michael Walsh	Waterford	Stradbally	6	
August	2010	Noel McGrath	Tipperary	Loughmore-Castleiney	13	
September	2010	Lar Corbett	Tipperary	Thurles Sarsfield's	11	
May	2011	Conal Keaney	Dublin	Ballyboden St. Enda's	12	
June	2011	Pádraic Maher	Tipperary	Thurles Sarsfield's	6	
July	2011	Lar Corbett	Tipperary	Thurles Sarsfield's	12	
August	2011	Michael Fennelly	Kilkenny	Ballyhale Shamrocks	8	
September	2011	Tommy Walsh	Kilkenny	Tullaroan	5	
May	2012	Willie Hyland	Laois	Clough-Ballacolla	7	
June	2012	Patrick Maher	Tipperary	Lorrha-Dorrha	11	
July	2012	Kevin Moran	Waterford	De La Salle	7	
August	2012	Joe Canning	Galway	Portumna	13	
September	2012	Henry Shefflin	Kilkenny	Ballyhale Shamrocks	15	
May	2013	Cahir Healy	Laois	Portlaoise	8	
June	2013	Richie McCarthy	Limerick	Blackrock	3	
July	2013	Paul Ryan	Dublin	Ballyboden St. Enda's	14	
August	2013	Tony Kelly	Clare	Ballyea	11	
September	2013	Shane O'Donnell	Clare	Éire Óg	14	
April	2014	Richie Hogan	Kilkenny	Danesfort	11	
May	2014	Stephen Maher	Laois	Clough/Ballacolla	11	
June	2014	T. J. Reid	Kilkenny	Ballyhale Shamrocks	12	
July	2014	Lee Chin	Wexford	Faythe Harriers	9	
August	2014	Séamus Hickey	Limerick	Murroe-Boher	3	
September	2014	Richie Power	Kilkenny	Carrickshock	13	
April	2015	Kevin Moran	Waterford	De La Salle	10	
May	2015	Cian Lynch	Limerick	Patrickswell	15	
June	2015	John O'Dwyer	Tipperary	Killenaule	13	
July	2015	Jonathan Glynn	Galway	Ardrahan	14	
August	2015	Séamus Callanan	Tipperary	Drom-Inch	14	
September	2015	T. J. Reid	Kilkenny	Ballyhale Shamrocks	12	
April	2016	Conor McGrath	Clare	Cratloe	11	
May	2016	Derek McNicholas	Westmeath	Lough Lene Gaels	14	
June	2016	Austin Gleeson	Waterford	Mount Sion	13	
July	2016	Daithí Burke	Galway	Turloughmore	2	
August	2016	Austin Gleeson	Waterford	Mount Sion	11	
September	2016	Séamus Callanan	Tipperary	Drom-Inch	14	
May	2017	Conor Lehane	Cork	Midleton	11	
June	2017	Mark Coleman	Cork	Blarney	5	
July	2017	Conor Cooney	Galway	St. Thomas'	14	
August	2017	Jamie Barron	Waterford	The Nire-Fourmilewater	8	
September	2017	Gearoid McInerney	Galway	Oranmore-Maree	6	
April	2018	Jason Forde	Tipperary	Silvermines	14	
May	2018	John Conlon	Clare	Clonlara	13	
June	2018	Patrick Horgan	Cork	Glen Rovers	15	
July	2018	Peter Duggan	Clare	Clooney-Quin	10	
August	2018	Aaron Gillane	Limerick	Patrickswell	13	
April	2019	Aaron Gillane	Limerick	Patrickswell	13	
May	2019	Patrick Horgan	Cork	Glen Rovers	15	
June	2019	Diarmuid O'Keeffe	Wexford	St. Anne's Rathangan	9	
July	2019	Patrick Horgan	Cork	Glen Rovers	15	
August	2019	Noel McGrath	Tipperary	Loughmore-Castleiney	8	
October	2020	Gearóid Hegarty	Limerick	St. Patrick's	10	
November	2020	Tony Kelly	Clare	Ballyea	11	
Semi-finals	2020	Stephen Bennett	Waterford	Ballysaggart	12	
December	2020	Gearóid Hegarty	Limerick	St. Patrick's	10	
May	2021	Ciarán Clarke	Antrim	McQuillan GAC Ballycastle	15	
June	2021	Tony Kelly	Clare	Ballyea	9	
July	2021	Jamie Barron	Waterford	The Nire-Fourmilewater	8	
August	2021	Cian Lynch	Limerick	Patrickswell	11	
March	2022	Stephen Bennett	Waterford	Ballysaggart	15	
April	2022	Diarmaid Byrnes	Limerick	Patrickswell	5	
May	2022	Shane O'Donnell	Clare	Éire Óg	12	
June	2022	Tony Kelly	Clare	Ballyea	11	
July	2022	Gearóid Hegarty	Limerick	St. Patrick's	10	
April	2023	John Conlon	Clare	Clonlara	6	
May	2023	Diarmuid Ryan	Clare	Cratloe	5	
June	2023	Conor Whelan	Galway	Kinvara	13	
July	2023	Cian Lynch	Limerick	Patrickswell	9	
March	2024	David Fitzgerald	Clare	Inagh-Kilnamona	8	
April	2024	Shane O'Donnell	Clare	Éire Óg	14	
May	2024	Darragh Fitzgibbon	Cork	Charleville	9	
June	2024	Shane O'Donnell	Clare	Éire Óg	14	
July	2024	Tony Kelly	Clare	Ballyea	10	
April	2025	Brian Hayes	Cork	St Finbarr's	15	
May	2025	Cian Lynch	Limerick	Patrickswell	11	
June	2025	Conor Burke	Dublin	St Vincent's	8	

== Multiple winners ==
The below table lists those who have won on more than one occasion.

*	Indicates current championship player

Rank	Player	Wins
1st	Tony Kelly*	5
2nd	Shane O'Donnell*	4
2nd	Cian Lynch*	4
4th	Henry Shefflin	3
4th	Patrick Horgan*	3
4th	Gearóid Hegarty*	3
7th	Noel McGrath*	2
7th	T. J. Reid*	2
7th	Austin Gleeson*	2
7th	Aaron Gillane*	2
7th	Jamie Barron*	2
7th	Stephen Bennett*	2
7th	John Conlon*	2
7th	Kevin Moran	2
7th	Séamus Callanan	2
7th	Joe Canning	2
7th	Lar Corbett	2
7th	Tommy Walsh	2
7th	Ger Farragher	2
7th	John Mullane	2
7th	Dan Shanahan	2

== Awards won by county ==
As of June 2025

County	Wins
Clare	16
Limerick	15
Kilkenny	14
Waterford	14
Tipperary	12
Galway	10
Cork	10
Dublin	5
Laois	3
Wexford	2
Westmeath	1
Antrim	1

== Awards won by club ==
As of June 2025

County	Wins
Ballyhale Shamrocks	7
Patrickswell	7
Ballyea	5
De La Salle	4
Éire Óg	4
St. Patrick's	3
Portumna	3
Thurles Sarsfield's	3
Glen Rovers	3
Ballyboden St. Enda's	2
Castlegar	2
Tullaroan	2
Lismore	2
Clough/Ballacolla	2
Mount Sion	2
Drom-Inch	2
Loughmore-Castleiney	2
The Nire-Fourmilewater	2
Ballysaggart	2
Cratloe	2
Clonlara	2
St Finbarr's	2
