= 2009 Tipperary county hurling team season =

Tipperary county hurling team
2009 season
Manager	Liam Sheedy
All-Ireland SHC	Runners-Up
Munster SHC	Winners
National League	Runners-Up
Top scorer SHC	Eoin Kelly (2-30)
Highest SHC attendance	82,106 (v Kilkenny 6 September)
Lowest SHC attendance	20,872 (v Clare 21 June)
Standard colours

The 2009 season was Liam Sheedy's second season in charge of the Tipperary senior hurling team. Tippeary won the Munster championship, defeating Waterford 4–14 to 2–16 in the final. They went on to reach the All-Ireland final but lost to Kilkenny 0–23 to 2-22.

== 2009 senior hurling management team ==
Name	Position	Club
Liam Sheedy	Manager	Portroe
Eamon O'Shea	Selector	Kilruane MacDonagh's
Michael Ryan	Selector	Upperchurch-Drombane
Cian O'Neill	Selector	Moorefield

=== 2009 squad ===
The following players made their competitive senior debut in 2009.

- Patrick Maher against Waterford on 8 February.
- Brendan Maher against Cork on 14 February.
- Gearóid Ryan against Cork on 14 February.
- Séamus Hennessy against Cork on 14 February.
- Noel McGrath against Cork on 14 February.
- Pádraic Maher against Dublin on 29 March.

== 2009 National Hurling League ==
8 February 2009 Round 1	Waterford	1-12 - 2-13	Tipperary	Walsh Park
	S Prendergast (0-6, three frees and two 65s), C Hennessy (1-0, free), S Molumphy (0-2), J Nagle (0-1), J Kennedy (0-1), D Shanahan (0-1), P Hurney (0-1).	Report	P Kelly (1-1), P Kerwick (1-1), W Ryan (0-4, three frees), J Woodlock (0-2), J Devane (0-2), P Maher (0-1), B Dunne (0-1), C O’Mahony (0-1, 65).	Referee: B Kelly (Westmeath)

14 February 2009 Round 2	Tipperary	2-15 - 0-9	Cork	Semple Stadium
	P Bourke 0-6 (5f), J O'Brien 1-1, P Maher 1-0, J Woodlock, S Hennessy 0-2 each, J Devane, S Maher, P Kelly, G Ryan 0-1 each.	Report	B Johnson (0-7, five frees), T Murphy (0-2).	Referee: M Wadding (Waterford)

1 March 2009 Round 3	Tipperary	0-23 - 0-16	Clare	Semple Stadium
	S Callinan (0-9, 7 frees), W Ryan (0-7, 4 frees), T Stapleton (0-2), N McGrath (0-2), J O’Brien (0-1), L Corbett (0-1), P Kelly (0-1).	Report	B Nugent (0-4), J Clancy (0-3), T Griffin (0-2), D McMahon (0-2), C Ryan (0-2, frees), N Gilligan (0-1), G Quinn (0-1, free), C Morey (0-1).	Referee: J Kelly (Cork)

22 March 2009 Round 4	Kilkenny	5-17 - 1-12	Tipperary	Nowlan Park
	M Comerford (3-2), TJ Reid (1-2), R Hogan (0-5, one free), A Fogarty (1-1), R Power (0-2, frees), E Brennan (0-2), M Grace (0-1), M Rice (0-1), D Fogarty (0-1).	Report	M Webster (1-0), S Hennessy (0-3), S Callanan (0-3, two frees), J O’Brien (0-2), C O’Mahony (0-2, one free, one 65), J Woodlock (0-1), N McGrath (0-1).	Referee: C McAllister (Cork)

29 March 2009 Round 5	Tipperary	2-19 - 4-11	Dublin	Semple Stadium
	S Callanan (1-4, three frees), N McGrath (0-5), G Ryan (1-0), J O’Brien (0-3), J Woodlock (0-2), S Hennessy (0-2, both frees), C O’Mahony (0-1, one 65), S McGrath (0-1), T Scroope (0-1).	Report	D Treacy (3-2), D O’Callaghan (1-4, two frees), A McCrabbe (0-4, three frees, one sideline), S Durkan (0-1).	Referee: D O'Driscoll (Limerick)

5 April 2009 Round 6	Galway	1-15 - 1-17	Tipperary	Pearse Stadium
	K Hynes (0-5), J Canning (0-5, 3f, 1 65), N Healy (1-1), C Callanan (0-1), N Hayes (0-1), A Callanan (0-1), A Smith (0-1).	Report	S Callanan (0-11, 7f, 1 65), L Corbett (1-2), N McGrath (0-1), T Scroope (0-1), S Hennessy (0-1), J Woodlock (0-1).	Referee: B Kelly (Westmeath)

19 April 2009 Round 7	Tipperary	1-17 - 1-11	Limerick	Semple Stadium
	G Ryan (1-3), P Bourke (0-6, four frees), L Corbett (0-3), J O’Brien (0-2), T Stapleton (0-2), J Devane (0-1).	Report	N Moran (0-9, five frees), P Browne (1-0), M O’Brien (0-1), D O’Grady (0-1).	Referee: D Murphy (Wexford)

3 May 2009 Final	Tipperary	4-17 - 2-26 (aet)	Kilkenny	Semple Stadium, Thurles
	S Callanan 1-7 (0-6f, 0-1 '65'), N McGrath 1-5 (0-1f), J O'Brien, J Woodlock 1-1 each, S McGrath 0-2, B Cummins 0-1 (0-1 f).	Report	R Hogan 1-10 (0-7f), A Fogarty 1-5, H Shefflin 0-4 (0-1f, 0-1'65), TJ Reid 0-4 (1 line ball), E Brennan 0-2, E Larkin 0-1.	Referee: J Sexton (Cork)

== 2009 Munster Senior Hurling Championship ==
31 May
Quarter-final

Tipperary	1-19 - 0-19	Cork
S Callanan 1-3, E Kelly 0-5, N McGrath, L Corbett 0-3 each, B Dunne, S McGrath 0-2 each, J O'Brien 0-1	(Report); Match Highlights	B O'Connor 0-11, J Gardiner 0-3, P Cronin 0-2, N McCarthy, T Kenny, A O hAilpin 0-1 each

Semple Stadium, Thurles
Attendance: 35,103
Referee: B Kelly (Westmeath)
21 June
Semi-final

Tipperary	3-18 - 1-22	Clare
N McGrath 0-7, J O'Brien 1-2, L Corbett 1-1, S Callanan 1-0, P Kerwick, E Kelly 0-3 each, D Fanning, J Woodlock 0-1 each	(Report); Match Highlights	C Ryan 0-12, D McMahon 1-2, T Griffin, J Clancy, T Carmody 0-2 each, J Conlon, D Barrett 0-1 each

Gaelic Grounds, Limerick
Referee: J Owens (Wexford)
12 July
Final

Tipperary	4-14 - 2-16	Waterford
L Corbett 2-2, E Kelly 1-3, S Callanan 1-1, N McGrath 0-3, P Kerwick, C O'Mahony, S McGrath, J O'Brien, B Dunne 0-1 each	(Report); Match Highlights	E Kelly 1-7, J Mullane 1-5, S Molumphy 0-2, D Shanahan, R Foley 0-1 each

Semple Stadium, Thurles
Referee: J Sexton (Cork)

== 2009 All-Ireland Senior Hurling Championship ==
16 August
Semi-final

Tipperary	6-19 - 2-07	Limerick
L Corbett 3-1, E Kelly 1-6, N McGrath 1-3, P Kerwick 1-2, S Callanan, C O'Mahony 0-3 each, J O'Brien 0-1	(Report); Match Highlights	B O'Sullivan 1-1, B Murray 1-0, G O'Mahony 0-2, S Hickey, N Moran, D Breen, A O'Shaughnessy 0-1 each

Croke Park, Dublin
Attendance: 43,808
Referee: B Gavin (Offaly)

6 September
Final

Kilkenny	2-22 - 0-23	Tipperary
H Shefflin 1-8, E Larkin, E Brennan 0-3 each, M Comerford 1-0, R Hogan 0-2, J Tyrrell, T Walsh, D Lyng, R Power, TJ Reid, M Fennelly 0-1 each	(Report); Full Match	E. Kelly 0-13, L Corbett 0-4, S Callanan 0-3, N McGrath 0-2, S McGrath 0-1

Croke Park, Dublin
Attendance: 82,106
Referee: D Kirwan (Cork)

== Awards ==
Pádraic Maher, Conor O'Mahony, Lar Corbett and Noel McGrath all won All Star Awards with McGrath also named as the Young Hurler of the Year.
