= Liam Sheedy =

Irish hurler (born 1969)

Personal information
- Native name: Liam Ó Siodaigh (Irish)
- Born: 24 October 1969 (age 57) Portroe, County Tipperary, Ireland
- Occupation: Former director
- Height: 5 ft 11 in (180 cm)

Sport
- Sport: Hurling
- Position: Left wing-back
Club
- Years: Club
- Portroe
Club titles
- Tipperary titles: 0
College
- Years: College
- 1987–1991: Limerick Institute of Technology
College titles
- Fitzgibbon titles: 0
Inter-county*
Years	County	Apps (scores)
1989–2000	Tipperary	7 (0–0)
Inter-county titles
- Munster titles: 0
- All-Irelands: 0
- NHL: 1
- All Stars: 0
- *Inter County team apps and scores correct as of 18:48, 10 January 2013.

Liam Sheedy (born 24 October 1969) is a former Irish hurler who was manager of the Tipperary senior hurling team on two occasions.

Born in Portroe, County Tipperary, Sheedy enjoyed All-Ireland success as a schoolboy hurler before enjoying championship success at club level with Portroe. After beginning his inter-county career with the Tipperary minor team, he later enjoyed All-Ireland successes with the Tipperary under-21 and junior teams. Sheedy made his senior debut during the 1989-90 league. He became a regular member of the starting fifteen in 1997. During his brief senior career he won a National Hurling League medal in 1999.

Sheedy began his managerial career with the Tipperary intermediate team in 2002 and, after some success, guided the Tipperary minor team to the All-Ireland title in 2006. Having briefly served as a selector with the Tipperary senior team, he eventually took over as manager and secured the All-Ireland title in 2010. His other inter-county activity saw him act as an adviser to the Antrim and Offaly senior hurling teams. Sheedy also enjoyed successful tenures as manager, coach, selector and adviser with club sides Portroe, Newmarket-on-Fergus and Drom-Inch, while he secured an Interprovincial Championship as manager of Munster.

In between his two spells as Tipperary senior manager, Sheedy was chairman of the National Hurling 2020 Committee, served as a member of the Irish Sports Council and was active in the media, usually as an analyst with The Sunday Game.

== Playing career ==
=== Portroe ===
Sheedy joined the Portroe club at a young age and played in all grades at juvenile and underage levels, enjoying championship success with the Portroe under-21 team in 1989. By this stage he had also joined the club's top adult team.

On 11 November 1990, Sheedy scored four points from midfield when Portroe defeated Mullinahone by 2–12 to 1–11 in the Tipperary Intermediate Championship final. It was the club's first county title in an adult grade.

=== Tipperary ===
==== Minor and under-21 ====
Sheedy first played at inter-county level as a member of the Tipperary minor hurling team. He made his first appearance for the team at right corner-back in a defeat of Limerick on 22 May 1987 and later won a Munster Championship medal after a 2–11 to 1–09 defeat of Cork in the final. On 6 September 1987, Sheedy lined out against Offaly in the All-Ireland final, however, Tipperary were defeated by 2–08 to 0–12.

Sheedy subsequently joined the Tipperary under-21 team, making his first appearance at full-back in a 2–14 to 5-05 Munster quarter-final draw with Cork on 21 June 1989. Later that season he won a Munster Championship medal after a 5–16 to 1–06 defeat of Limerick in the Munster final. On 10 September 1989, Sheedy was moved to right corner-back for Tipperary's 4–10 to 3–11 defeat of Offaly in the All-Ireland final.

In his second and final season with the under-21 team, Sheedy won a second successive Munster Championship medal after a 2–21 to 1–11 victory over Limerick in the final. On 9 September 1990, Sheedy was at centre-forward when Tipperary were defeated by Kilkenny by 2–11 to 1–11 in the All-Ireland final. It was his last game in the under-21 grade.

==== Junior ====
Sheedy was selected for the Tipperary junior hurling team for the first time on 11 June 1989. He played at left wing-back in the Munster Championship semi-final defeat of Limerick before later winning his first Munster Championship medal after a 2–14 to 2–08 victory over Clare in the final. On 21 July 1989, Sheedy won an All-Ireland medal after a 0–12 to 0–08 defeat of Galway in the final.

After being ineligible for the junior grade in 1990, Sheedy was selected for the Tipperary team again the following year and won a second Munster Championship medal after a 2–20 to 0–11 defeat of Cork in a final replay. On 8 September 1991, Sheedy won a second All-Ireland medal in the junior grade when he was at centre-forward for Tipperary's 4–17 to 1–05 victory over London in the final proper.

==== Senior ====
On 15 October 1989, Sheedy made his National Hurling League debut for Tipperary in a 1–10 to 1–09 defeat by Dublin at Croke Park. He later lined out for Tipperary in the Oireachtas Cup but was later dropped from the team before the 1990 Munster Championship.

After a seven-year hiatus, Sheedy was recalled to the Tipperary senior team. He made his first championship start on 26 July 1997 in a 3–24 to 3-08 All-Ireland quarter-final defeat of Down at St. Tiernach's Park. On 14 September 1997, Sheedy was at right wing-back for Tipperary in their 0–20 to 2-13 All-Ireland final defeat by Clare.

On 16 May 1999, Sheedy collected his only silverware at senior level when he won a National Hurling League medal after a 1–14 to 1–10 defeat of Galway in the final.

== Management and coaching career ==
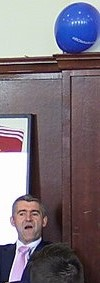
Sheedy in 2015

=== Tipperary ===
==== Intermediate manager ====
In November 2001, Sheedy took his first inter-county management position when he was appointed manager of the Tipperary intermediate hurling team. He enjoyed some early success with the team after guiding them to a Munster Championship title after a 4--8 to 2–07 defeat of Waterford in the final. On 21 September 2002, Tipperary suffered an eight-point defeat by Galway in the All-Ireland final replay.

==== Senior selector ====
On 5 November 2002, Sheedy joined the Tipperary senior hurling management team as a selector under new manager Michael Doyle. His sole season as a selector saw Tipperary suffer an early-round defeat by Clare in the Munster Championship before exiting the championship with a 3–18 to 0–15 defeat by Kilkenny in the All-Ireland semi-final.

==== Minor manager ====
In September 2004, Sheedy was ratified as manager of the Tipperary minor hurling team. His first season in charge ended with a surprise Munster semi-final defeat by Limerick.

Sheedy's second year as minor manager saw Tipperary face an early setback by losing the Munster final to Cork. In spite of this, used the "backdoor system" and qualified for the All-Ireland final on 3 September 2006. A 2–18 to 2–07 victory secured Tipperary's first All-Ireland title since 1996.

==== Senior manager ====
In September 2007, Sheedy was in line to take over as manager of the Tipperary under-21 team, however, his name was also mentioned as a possible successor to Babs Keating who had stepped down as senior team manager. After Declan Ryan declined the senior position, Sheedy became the clear favourite for the job and his appointment for a one-year term was ratified at a meeting of the county board on 25 September 2007.

Sheedy's first year got off to a promising start with Tipperary winning the pre-season Waterford Crystal Cup after a 3–13 to 1–13 defeat of Waterford on 27 January 2008. During the 2008 National League, Tipperary recorded three wins and two draws to finish second in Division 1B and secure a place in the knock-out stages. Subsequent defeats of Waterford and Kilkenny saw Tipperary qualify for the final in which they defeated Galway by 3–18 to 3–16 to take the title. In the subsequent Munster Championship, Sheedy guided the team to a first defeat of Cork in Cork since 1923, before later winning the Munster title following a 2–21 to 0–19 defeat of Clare in the final. Sheedy's only defeat of the entire season came with a two-point All-Ireland semi-final defeat by Waterford. Sheedy's reappointment as manager for another term was ratified on 21 October 2008.

Sheedy's second year got off to a bad start in the 2009 National League, Tipperary suffered a humiliating 5–17 to 1–12 defeat by Kilkenny in the group stage, however, both sides met again in the subsequent final which saw Kilkenny win by a goal after extra time. In spite of surrendering their league title, Tipperary later retained the Munster Championship title after a 4–14 to 2–16 defeat of Waterford in the final. Having been beaten at the All-Ireland semi-final stage in 2008, Sheedy's side used the memory of that loss to secure a 24-point defeat of Limerick the following year. He later stated: "There was a lot of hurt in our dressing room this time last year, 17 August was anything but a nice day and it hurt a lot of us. We waited a year to get back up here and redeem ourselves." On 9 September 2009, Tipperary lost the All-Ireland final to Kilkenny by 2–22 to 0–23 in a match described as one of the best ever. After the game Sheedy commented on the game and Kilkenny saying: "I felt the lads really gave it everything. We just needed a goal at some stage to really kick on, push on. We'd one or two chances, but found P. J. Ryan on a very good day today, but these lads have done everything I've asked of them in last eight months, everything I could possible want them to, so to just come up short is very, very disappointing, we knew we were facing the best team in probably the history of the game".

Sheedy's third season in charge saw Tipperary fail to make the knock-out stage of the National League before being defeated by Cork in the Munster quarter-final. The 3–15 to 0–14 defeat was Tipperary's biggest loss to Cork in 68 years. Sheedy came in for harsh criticism from his predecessor Babs Keating: "I think if Liam and his selectors sat down with us at that stage for a couple of hours, they needn't necessarily have taken our ideas on board, that he could have taken a few shortcuts along the way and he'd be in a better position today than he is". Tipperary regrouped in the All-Ireland Qualifiers before securing a place in the All-Ireland final against Kilkenny on 5 September 2010, where Sheedy guided the team to their 26th All-Ireland title. The 4–17 to 1–18 victory prevented their arch rivals from achieving a record-breaking fifth successive championship title.

On 7 October 2010, it was announced that Sheedy would be stepping down from his position as Tipperary manager. The manager and his selectors, who found themselves working up to 16 hours a day during their three-year term, cited work commitments as the reason for stepping down and he thanked the county board for their "top class" support. Sheedy was subsequently named as the Philips Sports Manager of the Year.

=== Munster ===
Sheedy was named as the manager of the Munster inter-provincial hurling team on 7 January 2012. His first year in the position saw Munster being defeated by Leinster at the semi-final stage of the Interprovincial Championship.

On 3 March 2013, Sheedy guided Munster to their first Interprovincial Championship title in six years after a 1–22 to 0–15 defeat of Connacht in the final. He remained as manager of the team until 2015.

=== Portroe ===
In 2012, Sheedy was appointed coach of the Portroe senior hurling team, with his brother John Sheedy serving as manager. On 22 July 2012, Portroe won their first ever North Tipperary Championship title after a 3–16 to 1–19 defeat of Toomevara in the final.

=== Newmarket-on-Fergus ===
In March 2012, Sheedy agreed to assist Clare club Newmarket-on-Fergus in an advisory capacity. On 28 October 2012, Newmarket-on-Fergus won their first Clare Championship title in 31 years after a 3–10 to 0–09 defeat of Cratloe in the final.

=== Drom-Inch ===
In 2015, Sheedy served as manager of the Drom-Inch senior hurling team. During his one season in charge, he guided the team to the semi-final stages of the Tipperary Championship.

=== Offaly ===
After chairing a special committee to help appoint Éamonn Kelly as manager of the Offaly senior hurling team in September 2015, Sheedy later joined the background team in an advisory capacity. His role with the team included being involved in a training capacity, however, he had no role on match days.<

=== Antrim ===
In July 2017, Sheedy was approached by Antrim senior hurling team joint-manager Terence McNaughton with a view to joining his management team in an advisory capacity. Accepting the offer he stated: "I’m just trying to help and support the lads to get the best out of the group, and to hopefully give them a bit of insight as someone who has been fortunate enough to have been involved with high performance teams over the years." In his role as an adviser, Sheedy linked up with the team at the Dunsilly Centre of Excellence "two or three times" a month, however, in spite of recording a victory over Offaly, Antrim were eventually relegated from Division 1B of the league. Sheedy's season with Antrim ended with the team securing their status in the Joe McDonagh Cup after a relegation play-off defeat of Kildare.

=== Return to Tipperary ===
On 24 September 2018, Sheedy was appointed as manager of the Tipperary senior hurling team for a three-year term. His first game back in charge was a 4–14 to 2–17 win against Limerick in the 2019 Munster Senior Hurling League on 14 December 2018. Tipperary won all four games of the 2019 Munster Championship group stage and reached the 2019 Munster Final where they lost to Limerick by 2–26 to 2–14.

On 18 August 2019, Tipperary beat Kilkenny by 3–25 to 0–20 in the All-Ireland final to win their 28th All-Ireland title and Sheedy's second as manager nine years apart.

In 2020, Tipperary reached the All-Ireland Quarter-Final where they were defeated by Galway by 3–23 to 2–24 on 21 November in the Gaelic Grounds.

In 2021, Tipperary again reached the All-Ireland Quarter-Final where they were defeated by Waterford 4–28 to 2–27 on 31 July in Páirc Uí Chaoimh. On 16 August 2021, Sheedy stepped down as manager after three years in charge.

== Career statistics ==
=== As a player ===
Team	Year	National League			Munster		All-Ireland		Total	
Team	Year	Division	Apps	Score	Apps	Score	Apps	Score	Apps	Score
Tipperary	1989-90	Division 1	1	0-00	—		—		1	0-00
Tipperary	1990-91	Division 1	—		—		—		—	
Tipperary	1991-92	Division 1	—		—		—		—	
Tipperary	1992-93	Division 1	—		—		—		—	
Tipperary	1993-94	Division 1	—		—		—		—	
Tipperary	1994-95	Division 1	—		—		—		—	
Tipperary	1995-96	Division 1	—		—		—		—	
Tipperary	1997	Division 1	5	0-03	0	0-00	3	0-00	8	0-00
Tipperary	1998	Division 1B	1	0-00	1	0-00	—		2	0-00
Tipperary	1999	Division 1B	6	0-00	3	0-00	—		9	0-00
Total			13	0-00	4	0-00	3	0-00	20	0-00

=== As a manager ===
Managerial league-championship record by team and tenure
Team	From	To	Record				
Team	From	To	P	W	D	L	Win %
Tipperary	25 September 2007	7 October 2010	37	27	3	7	73.0
Tipperary	24 September 2018	16 August 2021	0	0	0	0	—

== Honours ==
=== Player ===
Nenagh CBS

- All-Ireland Colleges' B Senior Hurling Championship (1): 1984

Portroe

- Tipperary Intermediate Hurling Championship (1): 1990

Tipperary

- National Hurling League (1): 1999
- All-Ireland Junior Hurling Championship (2): 1989, 1991
- Munster Junior Hurling Championship (2): 1989, 1991
- All-Ireland Under-21 Hurling Championship (1): 1989
- Munster Under-21 Hurling Championship (2): 1989, 1990
- Munster Minor Hurling Championship (1): 1987

=== Manager ===
Portroe

- North Tipperary Senior Hurling Championship (1): 2012

Newmarket-on-Fergus

- Clare Senior Hurling Championship (1): 2012

Tipperary

- All-Ireland Senior Hurling Championship (2): 2010, 2019
- Munster Senior Hurling Championship (2): 2008, 2009
- National Hurling League (1): 2008
- Waterford Crystal Cup (1): 2008
- Munster Intermediate Hurling Championship (1): 2002
- All-Ireland Minor Hurling Championship (1): 2006

Munster

- Interprovincial Championship (1): 2013

=== Individual ===
Honours

- Philips Sports Manager of the Year (1): 2010

Achievements
Preceded by Mattie Murphy	All-Ireland MHC winning manager 2006	Succeeded by Declan Ryan
Preceded by Brian Cody	All-Ireland SHC winning manager 2010	Succeeded by Brian Cody
Sporting positions
Preceded by Brendan Bonner	Tipperary Intermediate Hurling Manager; 2001-2002	Succeeded by Éamonn Kelly
Preceded by Paddy McCormack	Tipperary Minor Hurling Manager; 2004–2006	Succeeded by Declan Ryan
Preceded by Michael 'Babs' Keating	Tipperary Senior Hurling Manager; 2007–2010	Succeeded by Declan Ryan
Preceded by Len Gaynor	Munster Hurling Manager; 2012–2015	Succeeded by Anthony Daly
Preceded by Michael Ryan	Tipperary Senior Hurling Manager; 2018-2021	Succeeded by Colm Bonnar
