= 2006 All-Ireland Minor Hurling Championship =

All-Ireland Minor Hurling Championship 2006
Championship Details
- Dates: 1 April 2006 - 3 September 2006
- Teams: 17

All Ireland Champions
- Winners: Tipperary (17th win)
- Captain: Joey McLoughney
- Manager: Liam Sheedy

All Ireland Runners-up
- Runners-up: Galway
- Captain: Joe Canning
- Manager: Mattie Murphy

Provincial Champions
- Munster: Cork
- Leinster: Kilkenny
- Ulster: Antrim
- Connacht: Not Played

Championship Statistics
- Top Scorer: Richie Hogan (5-38)

The 2006 All-Ireland Minor Hurling Championship was the 76th staging of the All-Ireland Minor Hurling Championship since its establishment by the Gaelic Athletic Association in 1928. The championship began on 1 April 2006 and ended on 3 September 2006

Galway entered the championship as the defending champions in search of a third successive title.

On 3 September 2006 Tipperary won the championship following a 2-18 to 2-07 defeat of Galway in the All-Ireland final. This was their 17th All-Ireland title overall and their first title since 1996.

Kilkenny's Richie Hogan was the championship's top scorer with 5-38.

== Results ==
=== Leinster Minor Hurling Championship ===
Group A

Team	Matches				Score			Pts
Team	Pld	W	D	L	For	Against	Diff	Pts
Offaly	3	3	0	0	9-54	3-23	49	6
Carlow	3	2	0	1	7-33	2-20	28	4
Laois	3	1	0	2	5-42	5-41	1	2
Westmeath	3	0	0	3	2-16	7-28	-27	0

1 April 2006 Round 1	Carlow	1-08 - 1-09	Offaly	Dr. Cullen Park, Carlow
	P Kehoe 0-6, P Amond 1-1, A Cox 0-1.		D Currams 1-3, M Egan 0-3, G Scales 0-2, J Gorman 0-1.	Referee: F Devereux (Kildare)

5 April 2006 Round 1	Westmeath	3-20 - 1-09	Laois	Cusack Park, Mullingar
	W Hyland 1-8, J Prior 2-2, J O'Loughlin 0-5, G Reddin 0-4, P Bergin 0-1.		E Price 0-6, A Devine 1-0, R Jackson 0-1, S Egan 0-1, N Kilcoyne 0-1.

15 April 2006 Round 2	Offaly	4-25 - 1-04	Westmeath	St. Brendan's Park, Birr
	D Currams 3-4, M Egan 1-9, O Kealey 0-3, J Gorman 0-2, D Morkan 0-2, A Whelehan 0-1, J Mulrooney 0-1, D Horan 0-1, M Bevans 0-1, G Scales 0-1.		N Kilcoyne 1-1, O Price 0-3.	Referee: N Bartley (Meath)

15 April 2006 Round 2	Laois	1-10 - 1-11	Carlow	O'Moore Park, Portlaoise
	W Hyland 0-5, D Peacock 1-1, J Prior 0-2, J O'Loughlin 0-1, G Reddin 0-1.		P Kehoe 0-6, A Cox 1-2, P Walsh 0-1, C Clancy 0-1, D Kavanagh 0-1.	Referee: T Carroll (Offaly)

22 April 2006 Round 3	Carlow	5-14 - 0-02	Westmeath	Dr. Cullen Park, Carlow
	P Amond 3-1, D Murphy 1-4, P Kehoe 1-4, R Coady 0-2, P Walsh 0-1, A Cox 0-1, D O'Brien 0-1.		R Jackson 0-1, J Salmon 0-1.	Referee: D Connolly (Kilkenny)

29 April 2006 Round 3	Offaly	3-20 - 1-11	Laois	St. Brendan's Park, Birr
	O Kealey 1-3, D Currams 1-2, M Egan 1-2, D Horan 0-4, A Whelehan 0-3, J Gorman 0-2, G Scales 0-2, M Bevans 0-2.		Z Keenan 1-0, W Hyland 0-3, M Whelan 0-3, J O'Loughlin 0-2, D Delaney 0-2, G Reddin 0-1.	Referee: J McGrath (Westmeath)

Group B

Team	Matches				Score			Pts
Team	Pld	W	D	L	For	Against	Diff	Pts
Kilkenny	2	2	0	0	3-36	1-20	22	4
Dublin	2	1	0	1	2-19	2-24	-5	2
Wexford	2	0	0	2	1-17	3-28	-17	4

15 April 2006 Round 1	Kilkenny	1-18 - 1-09	Dublin	Nowlan Park, Kilkenny
	R Hogan 1-9, M Bergin 0-3, PJ Rowe 0-2, M Walsh 0-2, M Kelly 0-1, C Fennelly 0-1.		J Maher 1-1, C Guickian 0-2, P Brennan 0-2, P Ryan 0-2, S Murphy 0-1, J Cooper 0-1.

22 April 2006 Round 2	Dublin	1-10 - 1-06	Wexford	Parnell Park, Dublin
	P Ryan 0-6, W Brogan 1-0, J Sheanon 0-1, D Treacy 0-1, J Maher 0-1, C Guickian 0-1.		S Grannell 1-0, T Barron 0-2, K Burke 0-2, L Murphy 0-2.

29 April 2006 Round 3	Wexford	0-11 - 2-18	Kilkenny	Wexford Park, Wexford
	K Burke 0-7, R Fox 0-2, S Grannell 0-1, J Kelly 0-1.		R Hogan 1-8, M Walsh 1-3, M Bergin 0-5, J Farrell 0-1, J Mulhall 0-1.	Referee: T Carroll (Offaly)

Quarter-finals

6 May 2006 Quarter-final	Carlow	2-12 - 0-11	Wexford	Dr. Cullen Park, Carlow
	B Amond 2-1, P Kehoe 0-4 (2f), R Coady 0-2, A Cox 0-2, D Kavanagh, D Murphy, P Walsh 0-1.		D Murphy 0-3, L Murphy 0-3 (1f, 1 sideline), S Grannell 0-2, R Fox 0-2, K Burke 0-1 (1f).

6 May 2006 Quarter-final	Dublin	2-12 - 0-11	Laois	Parnell Park, Dublin
	P Ryan 0-5 (2fs, sideline, J Cooper 1-3, D Treacy 1-1, D Kelly, S Murphy (f), J Maher 0-1 each.		Z Keenan 0-8 (6f), D Maher, W Hyland, T Burke 0-1 each

Semi-finals

24 June 2006 Semi-final	Kilkenny	2-14 - 0-08	Dublin	O'Moore Park, Portlaoise
	R Hogan 1-5, C Fennelly 1-0, J Mulhall 0-3, M Murphy 0-2, J Farrell 0-2, M Walsh 0-1, M Bergin 0-1		P Ryan 0-5, S Murphy 0-2, D Kelly 0-1

24 June 2006 Semi-final	Carlow	2-15 - 0-16	Offaly	O'Moore Park, Portlaoise
	P Kehoe 1-7, P Amond 1-4, R Coady 0-3, P Walsh 0-1.	Report	J Gorman, D Horan 0-4 each; A Whelahan, G Scales, M Eagan 0-2 each; D Curram, O Kealey 0-1 each).

Final

2 July 2006 Final	Kilkenny	4-22 - 1-05	Carlow	Croke Park, Dublin
	R Hogan 2-10, J Farrell 1-2, M Bergin 0-4, N Anthony 1-0, M Walsh 0-3, J Mulhall 0-2, C Fennelly 0-1.		P Kehoe 1-3, C Coughlan 0-1, D Kavanagh 0-1.	Referee: J Owens (Wexford)

=== Munster Minor Hurling Championship ===
First round

5 April 2006 First round	Tipperary	2-13 - 1-08	Clare	Gaelic Grounds, Limerick
	J McLoughney 1-5, P Bourke 1-1, S Hennessy 0-2, G Ryan 0-2, B Maher 0-2, S Callanan 0-1.		C Ryan 1-3, J O'Connor 0-3, C Nealon 0-1, D Reidy 0-1.	Referee: M o'Connor (Limerick)

6 April 2006 First round	Cork	2-17 - 1-03	Limerick	FitzGerald Park, Kilmallock
	C O'Neill 1-1, A Mannix 0-4, P Horgan 0-4, D O'Callaghan 1-0, L Desmond 0-3, B Corry 0-2, T Murray 0-1, D Stack 0-1, R White 0-1.		T Ryan 1-0, S O'Donnell 0-1, D O'Connor 0-1, G Collins 0-1.	Referee: S Ryan (Tipperary)

Play-off

19 April 2006 Play-off	Clare	0-13 - 1-15	Limerick	Cusack Park, Ennis
	C Ryan 0-6, D Reidy 0-3, E Barrett 0-2, J Conlon 0-1, C O'Donovan 0-1.		D O'Connor 0-8, P O'Brien 1-0, M Ryan 0-2, T O'Brien 0-2, B Quinn 0-2, D Quaid 0-1.	Referee: P Casey (Waterford)

Semi-finals

3 May 2006 Semi-final	Tipperary	2-23 - 3-08	Limerick	Semple Stadium, Thurles
	N Bergin 1-3, J McLoughney 0-5, T Dunne 1-1, S Hennessy 0-4, S Callanan 0-3, P Bourke 0-3, E Hogan 0-2, M Gleeson 0-2.		M Ryan 2-4, S O'Donnell 1-1, D O'Connor 0-2, T Ryan 0-1.	Referee: C McAllister (Cork)

3 May 2006 Semi-final	Waterford	1-08 - 1-15	Cork	Fraher Field, Dungarvan
	P Murray 1-3, C Moloney 0-4, D Twomey 0-1.		C O'Neill 1-2, P Horgan 0-5, D O'Callaghan 0-2, B Coorry 0-2, D Stack 0-1, R White 0-1, L Desmond 0-1, T Murray 0-1.	Referee: J O'Mahony (Limerick)

Final

25 June 2006 Final	Tipperary	1-15 - 2-20	Cork	Semple Stadium, Thurles
	T Dunne (1-3), P Bourke (0-6), J McLoughney (0-2), B Maher (0-1), S Hennessy (0-1), N Bergin (0-1), E Hogan (0-1).	Report	P Horgan (0-7), R White (1-2), C O'Neill (1-1), D O'Callaghan (0-3), D Stack (0-2), L Desmond (0-2), T Murray (0-1), B Corry (0-1), P O'Sullivan (0-1).	Referee: J O'Mahony (Limerick)

=== Ulster Minor Hurling Championship ===
Semi-final

14 May 2006 Semi-final	Down	0-04 - 3-22	Antrim	Casement Park, Belfast
				Referee: M Mulholland (Derry)

Final

4 June 2006 Final	Antrim	8-18 - 2-05	Derry	Casement Park, Belfast
	C McGourty (4-5, 2 frees), C Coyle (2-1), P Shields (1-4), N McManus (0-4, two frees, one 65), P Dallat (1-0), P Doherty (0-2); S Burke (0-1), L McKillop (0-1).		P Henry (1-5, 0-5 frees), C McKenna (1-0, pen).	Referee: D Magee (Down)

=== All-Ireland Minor Hurling Championship ===
Quarter-finals

15 July 2006 Quarter-final	Tipperary	4-19 - 0-12	Carlow	Nowlan Park, Kilkenny
	P Bourke (1-12, 0-6 f), T Dalton (1-4), T Dunne (1-0), B Maher (1-0), G Ryan (0-2); M Gleeson (0-1).		P Kehoe (0-7, 0-4f), P Amond (0-2), D Murphy (0-2), A Cox (0-1).	Referee: D Magee (Down)

23 July 2006 Quarter-final	Galway	4-07 - 1-14	Antrim	Cusack Park, Mullingar
	A Harte 1-2, J Canning 1-2 (1f), S Coen 1-1, K Keehan 1-0, L Tully 0-1, G Hennelly 0-1.	Report	C McGourty 0-5 (5fs), A McCaffrey 1-0, E McCloskey 0-2, P Shields 0-2, N McManus 0-2 (1f), B McFall 0-1, P Dallat 0-1, R Donnelly 0-1 (f).	Referee: J McGrath (Westmeath)

Semi-finals

6 August 2006 Semi-final	Cork	0-16 - 2-12	Galway	Croke Park, Dublin
	P Horgan, (0-7 five frees), P O'Sullivan (0-2, one free); L Desmond (0-2), B Corry (0-2), R White (0-1); C O'Neill (0-1), D O'Callaghan (0-1).		J Canning (1-8, six points from frees, one 65, one sideline), S Coen (1-1), J Skehill (0-1 free); G Lally (0-1); A Harte (0-1).	Referee: J O'Mahony (Limerick)

13 August 2006 Semi-final	Kilkenny	3-09 - 0-19	Tipperary	Croke Park, Dublin
	R Hogan 0-6, J Mulhall 1-2, S Brennan 1-0, M Murphy 1-0, C Fennelly 0-1.	Report	P Bourke 0-6, T McGrath 0-3, J McLoughney 0-3, G Ryan 0-2; S Callinan 0-2, S Hennessy 0-1, N Bergin 0-1; T Dunne 0-1.

Final

3 September 2006 Final	Tipperary	2-18 - 2-07	Galway	Croke Park, Dublin
	P Bourke (1-07 (1-04f)), T Dalton (1-03), S Hennessy (0-02), T McGrath (0-02), M Gleeson (0-02), T Dunne (0-01), G Ryan (0-01).	Report	J Canning (0-05 (5f)), E Forde (1-00), E Concannon (1-00), G Hennelly (0-02).	Referee: D Connolly (Kilkenny)

== Championship statistics ==
=== Top scorers ===
Top scorer overall

Rank	Player	Club	Tally	Total	Matches	Average
1	Richie Hogan	Kilkenny	5-38	53	5	10.60
2	Paudie Kehoe	Carlow	3-37	46	7	6.57
3	Pa Bourke	Tipperary	3-35	44	6	7.33
