= Eoin Kelly (Tipperary hurler) =

Irish hurler

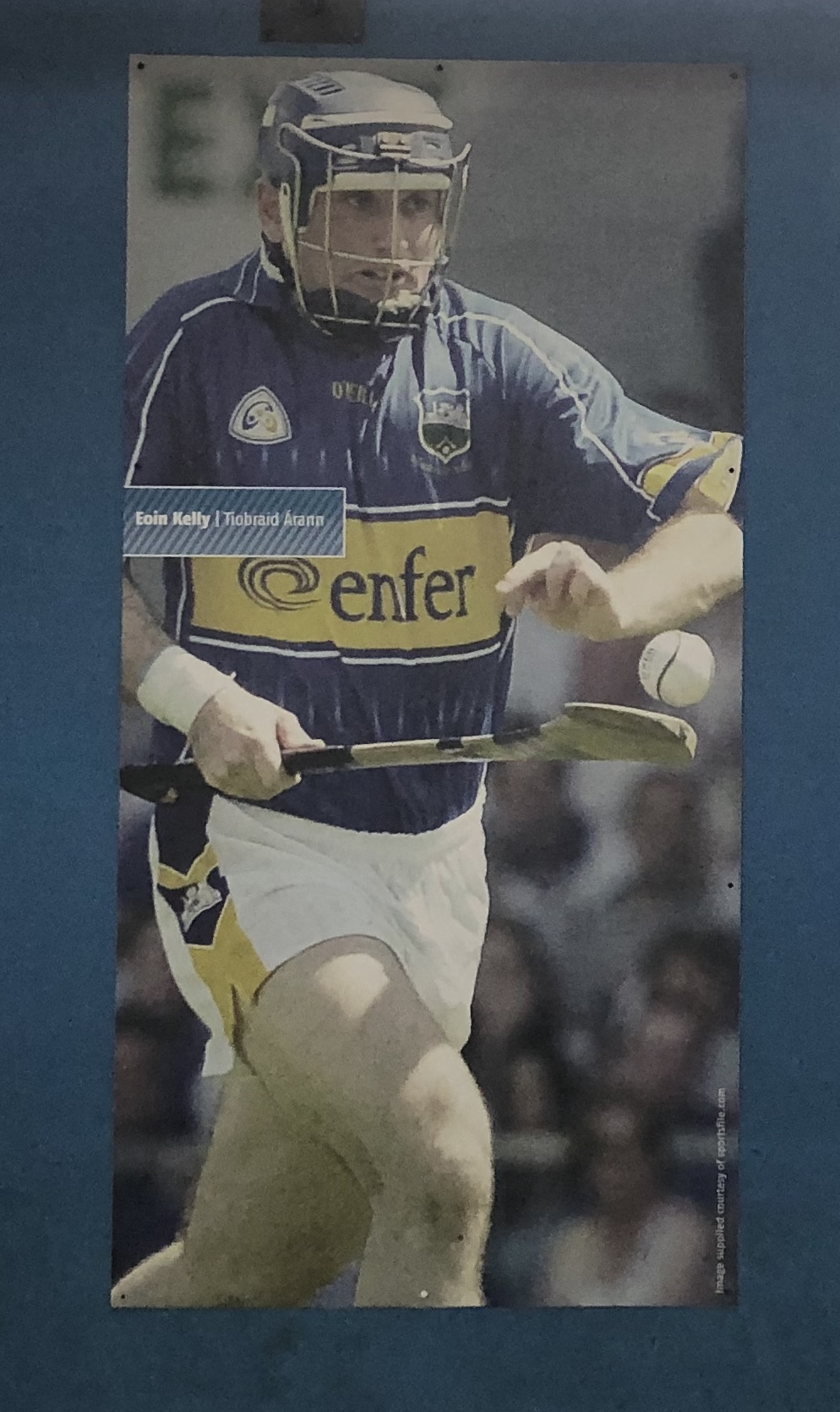

Personal information
- Native name: Eoin Ó Ceallaigh (Irish)
- Nickname: The Son of God
- Born: 6 January 1982 (age 44) Mullinahone, County Tipperary, Ireland
- Occupation: Bank official
- Height: 5 ft 10 in (178 cm)

Sport
- Sport: Hurling
- Position: Right corner-forward
Club
- Years: Club
- 1997–: Mullinahone
Club titles
- Tipperary titles: 1
College
- Years: College
- Limerick IT
College titles
- Fitzgibbon titles: 1
Inter-county*
Years	County	Apps (scores)
2000–2014	Tipperary	63 (21–369)
Inter-county titles
- Munster titles: 5
- All-Irelands: 2
- NHL: 2
- All Stars: 6
- *Inter County team apps and scores correct as of 01:37, 3 June 2018.

Eoin Kelly (born 6 January 1982) is an Irish hurler who played as a right corner-forward at senior level for the Tipperary county team.

Born in Mullinahone, County Tipperary, Kelly first played competitive hurling whilst at school in St Kieran's College. He arrived on the inter-county scene at the age of fifteen when he first linked up with the Tipperary minor team as a goalkeeper, before later joining the under-21 side. He made his senior debut during the 2000 championship. Kelly had a lengthy career, and won two All-Ireland medals, five Munster medals and two National Hurling League medals. He was an All-Ireland runner-up on three occasions.

At international level Kelly has played for the composite rules shinty-hurling team. As a member of the Munster inter-provincial team on a number of occasions, he won two Railway Cup medals. At club level Kelly is a one-time championship medallist with Mullinahone.

His brother, Paul Kelly, is also an All-Ireland medallist with Tipperary, while his first cousins, Niall and Ollie Moran had lengthy careers with Limerick.

Kelly's career tally of 21 goals and 368 points ranks him as the third highest championship scorer of all time. He remains Tipperary's all-time top scorer.

Throughout his career Kelly made 63 championship appearances. His announced his retirement from inter-county hurling on 1 December 2014.

During his playing days, Kelly won six All-Star awards. He has often been voted onto teams made up of the sport's greats, including at right corner-forward on a special Munster team of the quarter century in 2009.

Kelly accepted a role as selector under Davy Fitzgerald for the Waterford senior team ahead of the 2023 season.

== Playing career ==
=== Colleges ===
During his schooling at St Kieran's College in Kilkenny, Kelly established himself as a key member of the senior hurling team. In 1999 he won his first Leinster medal following a 3–13 to 1–11 defeat of Dublin Colleges.

Kelly added a second Leinster medal to his collection in 2000, as Dublin Colleges were once again defeated by 2–13 to 1–10. St Flannan's College provided the opposition in the subsequent All-Ireland decider. Having come close to beating the Ennis-based school at the same stage the previous year, St Kieran's made no mistake this time and recorded a 1–10 to 0–9 victory, giving Kelly an All-Ireland medal.

=== University ===
During his studies at the Limerick Institute of Technology, Kelly was an automatic inclusion on the college hurling team. In 2005 he was captain of the team that faced the University of Limerick in the final of the Fitzgibbon Cup. LIT failed to bend under the weight of history and recorded a comprehensive 2–13 to 3–4 victory to claim the title for the very first time.

=== Club ===
Kelly was just sixteen-year-old when he became a regular member of the Mullinahone senior hurling team. After winning several divisional championship titles, the highlight of his club career came in 2002 when Mullinahone reached the final of the senior championship for only the second time in their history. Local kingpins Thurles Sarsfields provided the opposition, however, in spite of leading by six points coming into the final quarter, the game ended in a 0–14 apiece draw. The replay was more conclusive. Kelly scored a remarkable 2–7 and picked up the man of the match award as Mullinahone claimed a 2–10 to 1–11 victory. Not only was it Kelly's first championship medal but it was also a first title for the club.

=== Minor and under-21 ===
Kelly was just fifteen-years-old when he made his minor championship debut for Tipperary as a goalkeeper in 1997. In a progressive move by the selectors he was later moved from the number one position to a more natural place in the full-forward line. He collected his first Munster medal that year following a 2–13 to 1–13 defeat of Clare.

Tipperary failed to retain their provincial crown the following year, however, in 1999 Kelly added a second Munster medal to his collection as Clare were defeated once again. Tipp progressed to the All-Ireland final where old rivals Galway provided the opposition. A 0–13 to 0–10 score line resulted in defeat for Kelly's side.

By this stage Kelly was also a key fixture on the Tipperary under-21 team. He was still only seventeen years-old when he came on as a substitute against Clare to claim his first Munster medal in that grade in 1999.

In 2003 Tipperary broke through Limerick's stranglehold on the championship and Kelly secured a second Munster medal following a 2–14 to 0–17 defeat of Cork after extra-time.

=== Senior ===
==== Beginnings ====
Kelly made his senior championship debut when he came on as a substitute on 23 July 2000 in a 1–14 to 0–15 All-Ireland quarter-final defeat by Galway, on a day when he doubled as sub-goalie.

==== Early successes ====
In 2001 Kelly became a regular member of the starting fifteen as Tipperary made it all the way to the league final. Clare provided the opposition and were left to rue five missed goal opportunities as Tipp claimed a 1–19 to 0–17 victory. It was Kelly's first National League medal. Later that year he added a Munster medal to his collection as Tipperary defeated Limerick by 2–16 to 1–17 to take their first provincial title in eight years. On 9 September 2001 Kelly lined out in his first All-Ireland decider as Tipperary faced Galway. The westerners put it up to Tipp, however, two goals by Mark O'Leary gave the Munster men the threshold to withstand a Galway comeback. With nine minutes to go Galway were only a point in arrears, however, Tipperary outscored Galway by five to three in those closing minutes. At the final whistle Tipperary were the winners by 2–18 to 2–15 with Kelly collecting his first All-Ireland medal. Kelly was later honoured with his first All-Star, while he was also named Vodafone Young Hurler of the Year.

Tipperary surrendered their Munster crown to Waterford in 2002, before later exiting the championship with a defeat by Kilkenny at the semi-final stage. In spite of ending the year with no silverware, Kelly later collected a second All-Star while he retained the title of Young Hurler of the Year.

Tipperary's fortunes took a downturn over the next few years, however, on a personal level Kelly picked up three more successive All-Stars between 2004 and 2006, joining Pat Hartigan as only the second player to win five All-Stars by the age of twenty-four.

In 2007 Kelly endured a frustrating season. After missing out due to a groin injury, he was later sensationally dropped from the starting fifteen by manager Babs Keating for Tipperary's All-Ireland quarter-final meeting with Wexford.

==== Return to success ====
The appointment of Liam Sheedy as Tipperary's new manager saw Kelly return to a more prominent role as captain of the side. Tipperary remained undefeated during their 2008 league campaign and qualified for the decider against Galway. A Lar Corbett goal proved decisive in the 3–18 to 3–16 victory. It was Kelly's second National League medal. He later collected a second Munster medal as Tipperary continued their winning streak with a 2–21 to 0–19 defeat of a resurgent Clare.

Tipperary retained their provincial crown in 2009, with Kelly collecting a third Munster medal following a 4–14 to 2–16 defeat of Waterford. On 6 September 2009 Tipperary faced four-in-a-row hopefuls Kilkenny in the All-Ireland decider. For long periods Tipp looked the likely winners, however, late goals from Henry Shefflin and substitute Martin Comerford finally killed off their efforts to secure a 2–22 to 0–23 victory.

Three successive Munster titles proved beyond Tipperary, however, in spite of a shock defeat by Cork in the provincial quarter-final, Tipperary used the qualifiers to good effect and qualified for the All-Ireland decider on 5 September 2010. Kilkenny were the opponents once again as they sought a fifth successive All-Ireland crown title. "The Cats" lost talisman Henry Shefflin early in the game due to injury, while Tipp's Lar Corbett ran riot and scored a hat-trick of goals before Noel McGrath added a fourth. The 4–17 to 1–18 victory gave Kelly, who was held scoreless throughout the match, his second All-Ireland medal, while he also had the honour of lifting the Liam MacCarthy Cup. He later won a sixth All-Star.

Tipperary reclaimed the provincial crown in 2011 following a huge 7–19 to 0–19 drubbing of Waterford in the decider. It was Kelly's fourth Munster medal. Tipperary subsequently faced Kilkenny in a third successive All-Ireland decider on 4 September 2011. Goals by Michael Fennelly and Richie Hogan in either half gave Kilkenny, who many viewed as the underdogs going into the game, a 2–17 to 1–16 victory. Kelly was marked by Noel Hickey and was held scoreless from play for his second successive All-Ireland Hurling Final.

Tipperary won their fourth Munster crown in five years in 2012 as they easily retained the title. The 2–17 to 0–16 defeat of Waterford gave Kelly a fifth provincial winners' medal.

==== Final Season ====
After a poor start to their 2014 championship campaign, Tipperary reached the All-Ireland final on 7 September 2014. Kelly started the game on the bench due to a back injury but was introduced as a substitute with 6 mins remaining. in what some consider to be the greatest game of all time. Kelly provided the pass to John Bubbles O'Dwyer who leveled the game for the final time. John O'Dwyer had the chance to win the game, however, his late free was judged by Hawk Eye to have gone wide resulting in a draw. Kelly remained on the bench for the replay which Kilkenny won by 2–17 to 2–14.

Kelly announced his retirement from inter-county hurling on 1 December 2014. Speaking to RTÉ Sport, Kelly said "Everyone has their time in the county jersey and my time has come now, I'm happy with the decision I have made in that now is the time to walk away. This season I had very limited game time and I'm also aware that Tipperary have a good up and coming team now".

=== Inter-provincial ===
In 2001 Kelly was first chosen on the Munster inter-provincial team. He was at right corner-forward as the southern province faced Connacht in the decider. A 1–21 to 1–15 victory gave Kelly his first Railway Cup medal.

Kelly was a regular on the team over the next decade, serving as captain in 2006 and 2012, however, these campaigns ended without success.

In 2013 Kelly was a peripheral player on the team, however, he came on as a substitute in the final against Connacht. The game faded out in the final quarter, however, Munster claimed a comprehensive 1–22 to 0–15 victory, with Kelly collecting a second winners' medal after coming on as a substitute.

=== International ===
Kelly was picked for duty with the national team in 2011, as Ireland faced Scotland in the composite rules shinty-hurling series of games. Ireland won the two-game on an aggregate score of 3–25 to 3–19.

== Recognition ==
During the GAA 125 celebrations in 2009, Kelly came in for particular praise when he was chosen at right corner-forward on a special Munster team of the quarter century. Later that year he was chosen on a list of 125 of the all-time greatest hurlers in a special Irish Independent poll.

After announcing his retirement, Kelly received widespread acclaim from former colleagues and opponents.

Tipperary captain Brendan Maher hailed Kelly as the best player he's ever seen: "I think if you put him in any position and gave him time there he’d be able to master it. He’s the best I’ve ever seen. I can’t speak about the players of the past. Obviously there’s many great men that have played for Tipperary but definitely in my lifetime he’s the best I’ve ever seen and I reckon he’ll be the best we’ll ever see."

Former All-Ireland-winning manager Liam Sheedy said: "Inspirational player, a magnificent captain and a dressing room icon."

Fellow Tipperary teammate and two-time All-Ireland medallist Brendan Cummins described Kelly as "...the complete forward."

== Managerial career ==
=== Tipperary ===
On 13 December 2019, it was confirmed that Kelly had been added to the Tipperary senior management team and served as a selector for Liam Sheedy during the 2020 and 2021 seasons.

=== Waterford ===
In September 2022, Kelly joined Davy Fitzgerald's backroom team at the beginning of Fitzgerald's second spell as Waterford senior team manager.

== Career statistics ==
Team	Year	National League			Championship		Total	
Team	Year	Division	Apps	Score	Apps	Score	Apps	Score
Tipperary	2000	Division 1B	0	0-00	1	0-01	1	0-01
Tipperary	2001	Division 1B	8	0-15	5	0-30	13	0-45
Tipperary	2002	Division 1B	7	2-41	6	2-39	13	4-80
Tipperary	2003	Division 1B	9	6-56	5	2-30	14	8-86
Tipperary	2004	Division 1B	6	5-39	3	2-20	9	7-59
Tipperary	2005	Division 1B	6	2-38	5	1-36	11	3-74
Tipperary	2006	Division 1B	3	3-12	4	3-38	7	6-50
Tipperary	2007	Division 1B	6	2-35	6	1-38	12	3-73
Tipperary	2008	Division 1B	7	2-56	3	1-21	10	3-77
Tipperary	2009	Division 1	0	0-00	5	2-30	5	2-30
Tipperary	2010	Division 1	6	2-35	6	3-44	12	5-79
Tipperary	2011	Division 1	3	0-03	5	4-30	8	4-33
Tipperary	2012	Division 1A	4	1-03	3	0-04	7	1-07
Tipperary	2013	Division 1A	5	3-22	2	0-07	7	1-07
Tipperary	2014	Division 1A	3	0-00	5	0-01	8	0-01
Total			73	28-355	64	21-369	137	49-724

== Personal life ==
Born in Mullinahone on the Tipperary-Kilkenny border, Kelly was educated at the local national school and later attended Scoil Ruáin in nearby Killenaule. After completing his Leaving Cert at St Kieran's College in Kilkenny, he studied engineering at the Limerick Institute of Technology. He currently works as a finance rep for Bank of Ireland.

On 11 February 2011 Kelly married long-term girlfriend Sarah Maher.

== Honours ==
=== Team ===
St Kieran's College

- All-Ireland Colleges' Senior Hurling Championship (1): 2000
- Leinster Colleges' Senior Hurling Championship (2): 1999, 2000

Limerick Institute of Technology

- Fitzgibbon Cup (1): 2005 (c)

Mullinahone

- Tipperary Senior Hurling Championship (1): 2002
- Séamus Ó Riain Cup (1) 2020 (c)
- South Tipperary Senior Hurling Championship (12): 1997, 1999, 2002, 2003, 2004, 2006, 2009, 2011, 2012, 2014, 2016, 2019 (c)
- Tipperary Intermediate Football Championship (3): 2000, 2006, 2011
- Tipperary Junior Football Championship (1): 2019

Tipperary

- All-Ireland Senior Hurling Championship (2): 2001, 2010 (c)
- Munster Senior Hurling Championship (5): 2001, 2008 (c), 2009, 2011 (c) 2012
- National Hurling League (2): 2001, 2008 (c)
- Munster Under-21 Hurling Championship (2): 1999, 2003(c)
- Munster Minor Hurling Championship (2): 1997, 1999

Munster

- Railway Cup (2): 2001, 2013

Ireland

- Composite rules shinty-hurling (1): 2011

=== Individual ===
Awards

- Munster Hurling Team of the Last 25 Years (1984–2009): Right corner-forward
- All-Star Awards (6): 2001, 2002, 2004, 2005, 2006, 2010
- GPA Awards (3): 2006, 2008, 2010
- All-Stars Young Hurler of the Year (2): 2001, 2002
- In May 2020, a public poll conducted by RTÉ.ie named Kelly in the full-forward line alongside Nicky English and Séamus Callanan in a team of hurlers who had won All Stars during the era of The Sunday Game.
- Also in May 2020, the Irish Independent named Kelly at number seventeen in its "Top 20 hurlers in Ireland over the past 50 years".

Awards
Preceded by Noel Hickey (Kilkenny)	Vodafone Young Hurler of the Year; 2001–2002	Succeeded by Setanta Ó hAilpín (Cork)
Sporting positions
Preceded by John Gardiner	Munster Hurling Captain; 2006	Succeeded by John Mullane
Preceded by Benny Dunne	Tipperary Senior Hurling Captain; 2008	Succeeded by Conor O'Mahony
Preceded by Willie Ryan	Tipperary Senior Hurling Captain; 2010	Succeeded by Paul Curran
Achievements
Preceded by J. J. Delaney (Waterford IT)	Fitzgibbon Cup Final winning captain 2005	Succeeded by Kevin Moran (Waterford IT)
Preceded by Michael Fennelly (Kilkenny)	All-Ireland SHC winning captain 2010	Succeeded by Brian Hogan (Kilkenny)
