= Noel McGrath (hurler) =

Irish hurler and Gaelic footballer

Personal information
- Native name: Nollaig Mac Craith (Irish)
- Born: 17 December 1990 (age 35) Loughmore, County Tipperary, Ireland
- Occupation: Account manager
- Height: 1.83 m (6 ft 0 in)

Sport
- Sport: Hurling
- Position: Midfield
Club
- Years: Club
- 2007–: Loughmore–Castleiney
Club titles
	Football	Hurling
Tipperary titles	6	5
Munster titles	0	1
College(s)
- Years: College
- 2009–2010 2010–2014: Limerick Institute of Technology; University College Dublin
College titles
- Fitzgibbon titles: 0
Inter-county*
Years	County	Apps (scores)
2009–	Tipperary	83 (5-191)
Inter-county titles
- Munster titles: 4
- All-Irelands: 4
- NHL: 0
- All Stars: 3
- *Inter County team apps and scores correct as of match played 24 May 2026.

Noel McGrath (born 17 December 1990) is an Irish hurler who plays for Tipperary Senior Championship club Loughmore-Castleiney and at inter-county level with the Tipperary senior hurling team. He usually lines out as at midfield.

== Playing career ==
=== Our Lady's Secondary School ===
McGrath first came to prominence as a hurler with Our Lady's Secondary School in Templemore. On 6 December 2006, he scored 1-03 from midfield when Our Lady's Secondary School defeated De La Salle by 1–10 to 2–04 to win the Dean Ryan Cup.

=== University College Dublin ===
During his studies at University College Dublin, McGrath joined the university's senior hurling team in his second year. He lined out in several Fitzgibbon Cup campaigns and served as team captain for two years.

=== Loughmore–Castleiney ===
McGrath joined the Loughmore–Castleiney club at a young age and played in all grades at juvenile and underage levels, enjoying championship success in the under-21 grade. He joined the club's senior teams as a dual player in 2007.

On 21 October 2007, McGrath was just 16-years-old when he lined out at left wing-forward in the Tipperary Hurling Championship final. He scored six points, including three frees, and collected a winners' medal following the 0–22 to 0–13 defeat of Drom–Inch. McGrath retained his position at left wing-forward for the Munster final against Tulla on 2 December 2012. He ended the game with a winners' medal following the 1–06 to 0–07 victory.

On 7 November 2010, McGrath lined out at left wing-forward when Loughmore–Castleiney faced Aherlow in the Tipperary Football Championship final. He was held scoreless throughout and ended the game on the losing side after a 2–04 to 1–06 defeat.

On 13 October 2013, McGrath lined out at midfield against Nenagh Éire Óg in the Tipperary Hurling Championship final. He ended the game with a second winners' medal following the 1–17 to 1–16 victory. On 3 November 2013, McGrath lined out in his second final of the year when Loughmore–Castleiney faced Aherlow in the Tipperary Football Championship final. He ended the game with a second winners' medal as Loughmore–Castleiney completed an historic double following a 3–10 to 0–09 victory.

McGrath lined out in a second successive Tipperary Hurling Championship final on 2 November 2014. He top scored with five points from left wing-forward in the 2–22 to 3–11 defeat by Thurles Sarsfields. McGrath lined out in a second successive Tipperary Football Championship final on 21 December 2014. He lined out at midfield in the 2–07 to 1–10 draw with Cahir. McGrath retained his position at midfield for the replay on 26 December 2014 and collected a second successive winners' medal following a 0–09 to 2–02 victory.

McGrath lined out in a third Tipperary Football Championship final in four seasons on 30 October 2016. He scored two points from midfield and ended the game with a third winners' medal following a 1–09 to 1–06 defeat of Moyle Rovers.

McGrath completed his second Tipperary double as Loughmore–Castleiney won the Tipperary Senior Football Championship against Clonmel Commercials on 21 November 2021, and then a week later won the Hurling Championship against Thurles Sarsfields. McGrath captained the team against Thurles Sarsfields.

=== Tipperary ===
==== Minor & under-21 ====
McGrath first played for Tipperary as a 15-year-old when he joined the minor team during the 2006 Munster Championship. He made his first appearance for the team on 3 May 2006 when he came on as a substitute for Gearóid Ryan in a 2–23 to 3–08 defeat of Limerick. McGrath was again selected on the bench for the Munster final. He was introduced as a substitute for Séamus Hennessy in the 2–20 to 1–15 defeat by Cork. On 3 September 2006, McGrath broke onto the starting fifteen and was named at midfield when Tipperary faced Galway in the All-Ireland final. He ended the game with a winners' medal following the 2–18 to 2–07 victory.

On 8 July 2007, McGrath scored a point from midfield when Tipperary won the Munster Championship following an 0–18 to 1–11 defeat of Cork in the final. On 2 September 2007, he was again selected at midfield for the All-Ireland final against Cork. He scored a point from play and claimed a second successive winners' medal following the 3–14 to 2–11 victory.

McGrath was again eligible for the minor grade for a third and final season in 2008. On 13 July 2008, he scored five points from play when Tipperary suffered a 0–19 to 0–18 defeat by Cork in the Munster final.

McGrath was drafted onto the Tippearry under-21 prior to the start of the 2009 Munster Championship. He made his first appearance for the team on 3 June 2009 when he scored a point in a 2–22 to 0–25 defeat of Cork.

On 28 July 2010, McGrath won a Munster Championship medal after lining out at midfield in Tipperary's 1–22 to 1–17 defeat of Clare in the final. He retained his position at midfield for the All-Ireland final against Galway on 11 September 2010. McGrath ended the game with an All-Ireland medal following the 5–22 to 0–12 victory.

McGrath was appointed captain of the Tipperary under-21 team for the 2011 Munster Championship. He played his last game in the grade on 15 July 2011 when he captained Tipperary to a 4–19 to 1–21 defeat by Cork.

==== Senior ====
McGrath joined the Tipperary senior team in early 2009 in advance of the 2009 National League. He made his first appearance for the team on 14 February 2009 when he came on as a substitute for James Woodlock in the 58th minute of a 2–15 to 0–09 defeat of Cork. On 3 May 2009, McGrath scored 1-05 from right corner-forward in Tipperary's 2–26 to 4-17 extra-time defeat by Kilkenny in the National League final. On 31 May 2009, he made his Munster Championship debut when he scored three points from right wing-forward in a 1–19 to 0–19 defeat of Cork. On 12 July 2009, McGrath started the Munster final at right corner-forward and ended the game with a winners' medal after scoring three points in the 4–14 to 2–16 defeat of Waterford. He was again selected at right corner-forward for the All-Ireland final against Kilkenny on 6 September 2009. McGrath scored two points from play but ended the game on the losing side following a 2–22 to 0–23 defeat. He ended his debut season by being named at right corner-forward on the All-Star team while he was also named Young Hurler of the Year.

On 5 September 2010, McGrath was selected at right corner-forward when Tipperary qualified to play Kilkenny in a second successive All-Ireland final. He was one of two goal-scorers for Tipperary and collected his first All-Ireland medal following a 4–17 to 1–18 victory. McGrath ended the season by winning a second All-Star award.

On 10 July 2011, McGrath won a second Munster Championship medal after scoring two points from right wing-forward in a 7–19 to 0–19 defeat of Waterford in the Munster final. On 4 September 2011, he was selected at centre-forward when Tipperary faced Kilkenny in a third successive All-Ireland final. McGrath scored three points from play but ended the game on the losing side following a 2–17 to 1–16 defeat.

On 15 July 2012, McGrath lined out at left corner-forward when Tipperary qualified to play Waterford in a second successive Munster final. He ended the game with a third winners' medal in four seasons after scoring three points in the 2–17 to 0–16 victory.

On 5 May 2013, McGrath was selected at right wing-forward when Tipperary faced Kilkenny in the National League final. He scored three points from play but ended on the losing side following a 2–17 to 0–20 defeat.

McGrath lined out at right corner-forward in a second successive National League final against Kilkenny on 4 May 2014. He scored five points from play but ended the game on the losing side following a 2–25 to 1–27 defeat. On 7 September 2014, McGrath scored four points from right corner-forward in a 1–28 to 3–22 draw with Kilkenny in the All-Ireland final. He was switched to centre-forward for the replay on 27 September 2014, however, he ended the game on the losing side after a 2–17 to 2–14 defeat.

On 15 April 2015, it was revealed that McGrath was to undergo surgery for testicular cancer two days later. He later said: "I knew for two or three weeks that there wasn't something fully right. You're just hoping that you got hit in training or maybe you got a belt but the longer it was there, I knew something wasn't right. Thankfully I got looked after very well." McGrath returned to the Tipperary training panel in June 2015. On 16 August 2015, he received a standing ovation when he came on as a substitute in Tipperary's 0–26 to 3–16 defeat by Galway in the All-Ireland semi-final. McGrath was named as the 2015 Tipperary Person of the Year by the Tipperary Association Dublin.

McGrath claimed a fourth Munster Championship medal on 10 July 2016 after scoring a point from left wing-forward in a 5–19 to 0–13 defeat of Waterford in the final. On 5 September 2016, he retained his position at left wing-forward for the All-Ireland final against Kilkenny. McGrath scored a point from play and collected a second All-Ireland medal following a 2–29 to 2–20 victory.

On 23 April 2017, McGrath lined out in his fourth National League final. He scored two points from right corner-forward but ended the game on the losing side following a 3–21 to 0–14 victory for Galway.

On 30 June 2019, McGrath scored a point from midfield when Tipperary suffered a 2–26 to 2–14 defeat by Limerick in the Munster final. On 18 August 2019, he was selected at midfield when Tipperary faced Kilkenny in the All-Ireland final. McGrath scored two points from play and ended the game with a third All-Ireland winners' medal following the 3–25 to 0–20 victory. He ended the season by receiving his third All-Star award.

In November 2022, McGrath was named as the new Tipperary captain for the 2023 season.

On 27 April 2025, McGrath came on as a substitute against Cork to play his 74th championship match for Tipperary, breaking the record he had previously shared with Brendan Cummins when he came on as a substitute against Limerick on 20 April 2025. On 20 July in the 2025 All-Ireland final, McGrath came on as a substitute for his 79th championship appearance and scored the last point of the match as Tipperary defeated Cork by 3–27 to 1-18 and claim a 29th All-Ireland title and a fourth title for McGrath. He is the first from the county to win a fourth medal since Mick Burns, Sean McLoughlin and John McKenna achieved it in 1965.

In 2026, McGrath played his 18th season with the Tipperary senior hurling team. He came on as a substitute in the first three matches of the Munster Senior Hurling Championship, and started the final game against Limerick on 24 May as Tipperary failed to qualify for the All-Ireland Senior Hurling Championship.

=== Munster ===
McGrath was added to the Munster team in advance of the 2012 Railway Cup. He made his first appearance for the team on 9 February 2014 when he scored two points from centre-forward in a 1–18 to 0–16 defeat by Connacht.

On 15 December 2016, McGrath was selected on the bench when Munster faced Leinster in the Railway Cup final. He was introduced as a half-time substitute for Shane Bennett and claimed a Railway Cup medal following the 2–20 to 2–16 victory.

== Personal life ==
McGrath is the son of Pat McGrath who won an All-Ireland medal with Tipperary in 1989. His brother, John, is also an All-Ireland medal winner, and a current teammate on the Tipperary senior team, while his youngest brother, Brian, has also lined out with the Tipperary senior team. He married Aisling Crowe in December 2021 and they have two children, a boy born in 2023 and a girl born in 2025.

== Career statistics ==
=== Club ===
==== Hurling ====
As of match played 5 September 2026

Team	Year	Tipperary		Munster		All-Ireland		Total	
Team	Year	Apps	Score	Apps	Score	Apps	Score	Apps	Score
Loughmore–Castleiney	2007-08	4	0-23	3	0-11	1	1-04	8	1-38
Loughmore–Castleiney	2008	3	0-08	—		—		3	0-08
Loughmore–Castleiney	2009	1	0-08	—		—		1	0-08
Loughmore–Castleiney	2010	2	1-05	—		—		2	1-05
Loughmore–Castleiney	2011	1	1-04	—		—		1	1-04
Loughmore–Castleiney	2012	3	1-13	—		—		3	1-13
Loughmore–Castleiney	2013	4	0-27	1	0-09	—		5	0-36
Loughmore–Castleiney	2014	7	0-29	—		—		7	0-29
Loughmore–Castleiney	2015	1	0-03	—		—		1	0-03
Loughmore–Castleiney	2016	3	0-10	—		—		3	0-10
Loughmore–Castleiney	2017	4	0-10	—		—		4	0-10
Loughmore–Castleiney	2018	5	0-18	—		—		5	0-18
Loughmore–Castleiney	2019	4	0-20	—		—		4	0-20
Loughmore–Castleiney	2020	6	0-13	—		—		6	0-13
Loughmore–Castleiney	2021	8	1-18	1	0-00	—		9	1-18
Loughmore–Castleiney	2022	4	0-17	—		—		4	0-17
Loughmore–Castleiney	2023	5	0-12	—		—		5	0-12
Loughmore–Castleiney	2024	6	0-07	1	0-01	—		7	0-08
Loughmore–Castleiney	2025	6	0-19	1	0-01	—		7	0-20
Loughmore–Castleiney	2026	4	0-02	—		—		4	0-02
Career total		81	4-266	7	0-22	1	1-04	89	5-292

==== Football ====
As of match played 18 October 2026

Team	Year	Tipperary		Munster		Total	
Team	Year	Apps	Score	Apps	Score	Apps	Score
Loughmore–Castleiney	2007	2	0-00	—		2	0-00
Loughmore–Castleiney	2008	2	0-04	—		2	0-04
Loughmore–Castleiney	2009	3	0-00	—		3	0-00
Loughmore–Castleiney	2010	5	1-04	—		5	1-04
Loughmore–Castleiney	2011	1	0-02	—		1	0-02
Loughmore–Castleiney	2012	4	0-01	—		4	0-01
Loughmore–Castleiney	2013	7	1-11	1	0-00	8	1-11
Loughmore–Castleiney	2014	8	1-07	—		8	1-07
Loughmore–Castleiney	2015	2	0-00	—		2	0-00
Loughmore–Castleiney	2016	5	1-03	1	0-00	6	1-03
Loughmore–Castleiney	2017	4	1-02	—		4	1-02
Loughmore–Castleiney	2018	5	0-05	—		5	0-05
Loughmore–Castleiney	2019	4	0-02	—		4	0-02
Loughmore–Castleiney	2020	5	0-01	—		5	0-01
Loughmore–Castleiney	2021	6	0-01	1	0-01	7	0-02
Loughmore–Castleiney	2022	5	0-05	—		5	0-05
Loughmore–Castleiney	2023	3	0-01	—		3	0-01
Loughmore–Castleiney	2024	6	0-06	2	0-00	6	0-06
Loughmore–Castleiney	2025	4	0-03	—		4	0-03
Loughmore–Castleiney	2026	6	0-05	0	0-00	6	0-05
Career total		87	5-63	5	0-01	92	5-64

=== Inter-county ===
Team	Year	National League			Munster		All-Ireland		Total	
Team	Year	Division	Apps	Score	Apps	Score	Apps	Score	Apps	Score
Tipperary	2009	Division 1	6	1-14	3	0-13	2	1-05	11	2-32
Tipperary	2010	Division 1	5	2-08	1	0-00	5	1-10	11	3-18
Tipperary	2011	Division 1	5	0-12	3	0-09	2	0-06	10	0-27
Tipperary	2012	Division 1A	6	1-23	3	1-10	1	0-02	10	2-35
Tipperary	2013	Division 1A	7	0-14	1	0-01	1	0-01	9	0-16
Tipperary	2014	Division 1A	8	1-18	1	0-01	6	0-15	15	1-34
Tipperary	2015	Division 1A	5	1-11	—		1	0-01	6	1-12
Tipperary	2016	Division 1A	6	0-11	3	0-06	2	0-04	11	0-21
Tipperary	2017	Division 1A	8	2-12	1	0-03	4	0-07	13	2-22
Tipperary	2018	Division 1A	3	0-08	4	1-09	—		7	1-17
Tipperary	2019	Division 1A	6	0-11	5	1-11	3	0-08	14	1-30
Tipperary	2020	Division 1A	3	0-01	1	0-02	2	0-04	6	0-07
Tipperary	2021	Division 1A	3	1-04	2	0-00	1	0-01	6	1-05
Tipperary	2022	Division 1B	3	0-05	4	0-33	—		7	0-38
Tipperary	2023	Division 1B	5	0-05	4	0-13	2	0-02	11	0-18
Tipperary	2024	Division 1B	2	0-03	4	0-06	—		6	0-09
Tipperary	2025	Division 1A	2	0-01	4	0-02	3	0-02	9	0-05
Tipperary	2026	Division 1A	4	0-08	4	0-02	—		8	0-10
Career total			87	9-169	48	3-121	35	2-68	170	14-358

== Honours ==
Loughmore–Castleiney

- Munster Senior Club Hurling Championship (1): 2007
- Tipperary Senior Hurling Championship (5): 2007, 2013, 2021 (c), 2024, 2025
- Tipperary Senior Football Championship (6): 2013, 2014, 2016, 2021, 2024, 2026
- Mid Tipperary Senior Hurling Championship (5): 2011, 2016, 2018, 2024, 2026
- Mid Tipperary Senior Football Championship (10): 2007, 2008, 2009, 2010, 2012, 2015, 2016, 2017, 2018, 2023

Tipperary

- All-Ireland Senior Hurling Championship (4): 2010, 2016, 2019, 2025
- Munster Senior Hurling Championship (4): 2009, 2011, 2012, 2016
- Waterford Crystal Cup (2): 2012, 2014
- All-Ireland Under-21 Hurling Championship (1): 2010
- Munster Under-21 Hurling Championship (2): 2008, 2010
- All-Ireland Minor Hurling Championship (2): 2006, 2007
- Munster Minor Hurling Championship (1): 2007

Munster

- Railway Cup (1): 2016

Individual

- All Stars Young Hurler of the Year (1): 2009
- GAA GPA All Stars Awards (3): 2009, 2010, 2019
- GAA/GPA Player of the Month (2): August 2010, August 2019
- All-Ireland Senior Hurling Championship Final Man of the Match (1): 2019
- The Sunday Game Team of the Year (1): 2019
- The Sunday Game Hurler of the Year (1): 2019

Sporting positions
Preceded by Pádraic Maher	Tipperary Under-21 Hurling Captain; 2011	Succeeded by John O'Dwyer
Awards
Preceded by Joe Canning	All-Stars Young Hurler of the Year; 2009	Succeeded by Brendan Maher
Preceded by Kyle Hayes	All-Ireland Senior Hurling Final; Man of the Match; 2019	Succeeded by Gearóid Hegarty
