= Joey McLoughney =

Irish hurler

Personal information
- Born: 12 January 1988 (age 38) Toomevara, County Tipperary, Ireland
- Occupation: Electrical supervisor

Sport
- Sport: Hurling
- Position: Full-forward
Club
- Years: Club
- Toomevara
Club titles
- Tipperary titles: 2
- Munster titles: 1
- All-Ireland Titles: 0
Inter-county*
Years	County	Apps (scores)
2013	Tipperary	0 (0-00)
Inter-county titles
- Munster titles: 0
- All-Irelands: 0
- NHL: 0
- All Stars: 0
- *Inter County team apps and scores correct as of 20:32, 16 August 2021.

Joey McLoughney (born 12 January 1988) is an Irish hurler who plays at club level with Toomevara. He is a former member of the Tipperary senior hurling team.

== Playing career ==
McLoughney first came to prominence at juvenile and underage levels with the Toomevara club. After joining the club's top adult team while still a minor, he was part of their Munster Club Championship-winning team in 2006, while also winning two County Championship titles. McLoughney first appeared on the inter-county scene during a four-year stint with the Tipperary minor team, which culminated with him captaining the team to the All-Ireland Championship in 2006. He subsequently joined the Tipperary under-21 team and lined out in the 2008 All-Ireland under-21 final defeat by Kilkenny. McLoughney was drafted onto the Tipperary senior hurling team for the pre-season Waterford Crystal Cup in 2013 but was released from the panel shortly after. He ended his inter-county career with an All-Ireland Championship title with the Tipperary intermediate team in 2013.

== Honours ==
Toomevara

- Munster Senior Club Hurling Championship: 2006
- Tipperary Senior Hurling Championship: 2006, 2006

Tipperary

- All-Ireland Intermediate Hurling Championship: 2013
- Munster Intermediate Hurling Championship: 2013
- Munster Under-21 Hurling Championship: 2008

Achievements
Preceded by Andrew Keary	All-Ireland Minor Hurling Final winning captain 2006	Succeeded by Brendan Maher
