= 2016 All-Ireland Senior Hurling Championship =

Championship details
- Dates: 1 May – 4 September 2016
- Teams: 14

All-Ireland champions
- Winning team: Tipperary (27th win)
- Captain: Brendan Maher
- Manager: Michael Ryan

All-Ireland Finalists
- Losing team: Kilkenny
- Captain: Shane Prendergast
- Manager: Brian Cody

Provincial champions
- Munster: Tipperary
- Leinster: Kilkenny
- Ulster: Antrim
- Connacht: Not Played

Championship statistics
- No. matches played: 21
- Goals total: 47 (2.2 per match)
- Points total: 790 (37.6 per match)
- Top Scorer: Shane Dooley (4–46)
- Player of the Year: Austin Gleeson
- All-Star Team: See here

The 2016 All-Ireland Senior Hurling Championship was the 129th staging of the All-Ireland championship since its establishment by the Gaelic Athletic Association in 1887. It is the top tier of senior inter-county championship hurling.

The championship began on 1 May 2016 and ended on 4 September 2016.

Kilkenny were the defending champions. Kerry qualified for the competition for the first time since 2004

Tipperary won the title for the 27th time and for the first time since 2010, defeating Kilkenny in the final, 2–29 to 2–20.

== Format ==
The All-Ireland Senior Hurling Championship is a double-elimination tournament based on the Leinster and Munster provincial championships. Fourteen teams take part.

=== Leinster and Munster Hurling Championships ===
Leinster Senior Hurling Championship

Seven Leinster counties compete. Galway and Kerry, though not in Leinster, also participate. The competition begins with a qualifier group consisting of the four weakest teams. Two teams from the qualifier group progress and the remainder of the competition is knock-out. Most of the beaten teams enter the All-Ireland qualifiers – the two bottom teams in the Leinster qualifier group do not.

In 2016 the bottom team in the Leinster qualifier group will be relegated to next year's Christy Ring Cup (2nd tier). Their place in next year's Leinster qualifier group will be taken by the winner of 2016's Christy Ring Cup.

Kerry qualified for this year's Leinster Championship by winning the 2015 Christy Ring Cup.

Munster Senior Hurling Championship

Five Munster counties compete. Kerry participates in The Leinster Hurling Championship (see above). The competition has a knock-out format. All of the beaten teams enter the All-Ireland qualifiers.

=== Qualifiers ===
All teams beaten in the quarter-finals and semi-finals of the Leinster and Munster Hurling Championships enter the All-Ireland hurling qualifiers which are knock-out. The qualifiers eventually result in two teams who play the beaten finalists of the Leinster and Munster championships in the two All-Ireland quarter-finals.

=== All-Ireland ===
The Leinster and Munster champions play the winners of the two quarter finals in the semi-finals. The final normally takes place on the first Sunday in September.

=== Non-participating Provincial Championships ===
Connacht and Ulster teams can qualify for the All-Ireland Senior Hurling Championship by winning the Christy Ring Cup (tier 2).

Connacht Senior Hurling Championship

This competition is no longer organised. Galway represent Connacht and participate in the Leinster Championship.

Ulster Senior Hurling Championship

Although this competition takes place, it is not part of the All-Ireland Senior Hurling Championship. Currently no Ulster teams qualify for the All-Ireland Senior Hurling Championship.

== Team changes ==
=== To Championship ===
Promoted from the Christy Ring Cup

- Kerry

=== From Championship ===
Relegated to the Christy Ring Cup

- Antrim

== Teams ==
=== General information ===
Fourteen counties will compete in the All-Ireland Senior Hurling Championship: nine teams in the Leinster Senior Hurling Championship and five teams in the Munster Senior Hurling Championship.

County	Last provincial title	Last championship title	Position in 2015 championship	Current championship	Appearance
Carlow	—	—	Group Stage (Leinster Senior Hurling Championship)	Leinster Senior Hurling Championship	
Clare	1998	2013	Round 2	Munster Senior Hurling Championship	
Cork	2014	2005	Quarter-finals	Munster Senior Hurling Championship	
Dublin	2013	1938	Quarter-finals	Leinster Senior Hurling Championship	
Galway	2012	1988	Runners-up	Leinster Senior Hurling Championship	
Kerry	1891	1891	Champions (Christy Ring Cup)	Leinster Senior Hurling Championship	
Kilkenny	2015	2015	Champions	Leinster Senior Hurling Championship	
Laois	1949	1915	Round 1	Leinster Senior Hurling Championship	
Limerick	2013	1973	Round 2	Munster Senior Hurling Championship	
Offaly	1995	1998	Round 1	Leinster Senior Hurling Championship	
Tipperary	2015	2010	Semi-finals	Munster Senior Hurling Championship	
Waterford	2010	1959	Semi-finals	Munster Senior Hurling Championship	
Westmeath	—	—	Round 1	Leinster Senior Hurling Championship	
Wexford	2004	1996	Round 1	Leinster Senior Hurling Championship	

=== Overview ===
All bar one of the teams from the 2015 championship participated in hurling's top tier in 2016.

Antrim, who finished bottom of the 2015 Leinster qualifier group, were relegated to the 2016 Christy Ring Cup. Their place in the 2016 Leinster qualifier group went to Kerry who won the 2015 Christy Ring Cup and gained automatic promotion. It was the first time since 2004 that Kerry participated in the All-Ireland senior championship.

=== List of teams ===
Team	Colours	Sponsor	Captain(s)	Vice-captain(s)	Manager(s)	Most recent success
Team	Colours	Sponsor	Captain(s)	Vice-captain(s)	Manager(s)	All-Ireland	Provincial	League
Carlow		Dan Morrissey Ltd.	Séamus Murphy Alan Corcoran		Pat English
Clare		Pat O'Donnell	Tony Kelly Cian Dillon	Colin Ryan Shane O'Donnell	Davy Fitzgerald	2013	1998	2016
Cork		Chill Insurance	Stephen McDonnell	Séamus Harnedy	Kieran Kingston	2005	2014	1998
Dublin		AIG	Liam Rushe		Ger Cunningham	1938	2013	2011
Galway		Supermac's	David Burke	Joe Canning	Micheal Donoghue	1988	2012	2010
Kerry		Kerry Group	Daniel Collins	Tom Murnane	Ciarán Carey	1891	1891
Kilkenny		Glanbia	Shane Prendergast		Brian Cody	2015	2015	2014
Laois		MW Hire Services	Charles Dwyer		Séamus Plunkett	1915	1949
Limerick		Sporting Limerick	Nickie Quaid	Séamus Hickey	T. J. Ryan	1973	2013	1997
Offaly		Carroll Cuisine	Colin Egan	James Dempsey James Mulrooney	Éamonn Kelly	1998	1995	1990–91
Tipperary		Intersport/Elverys	Brendan Maher	Pádraic Maher	Michael Ryan	2010	2015	2008
Waterford		3	Kevin Moran		Derek McGrath	1959	2010	2015
Westmeath		Renault	Aonghus Clarke		Michael Ryan
Wexford		Gain	Matthew O'Hanlon	Lee Chin	Liam Dunne	1996	2004	1972–73

== Summary ==
=== Other Championship Tiers ===
Level on Pyramid	Competition	Champions	Runners up
Tier 1	2016 All-Ireland Senior Hurling Championship	Tipperary	Kilkenny
Tier 1 (Leinster)	2016 Leinster Senior Hurling Championship	Kilkenny	Galway
Tier 1 (Munster)	2016 Munster Senior Hurling Championship	Tipperary	Waterford
Tier 1 (Ulster)	2016 Ulster Senior Hurling Championship	Antrim	Armagh
Tier 2	2016 Christy Ring Cup	Meath	Antrim
Tier 3	2016 Nicky Rackard Cup	Mayo	Armagh
Tier 4	2016 Lory Meagher Cup	Louth	Sligo

== Changes from 2015 championship ==
Hawkeye was used for the first time in the Munster Hurling Championship in Thurles when Tipperary played Cork on 22 May 2016. Previously it was only installed in Croke Park.

== Provincial championships ==
=== Leinster Senior Hurling Championship ===
==== Group Stage ====
Pos	Team	Pld	W	D	L	SF	SA	SD	Pts	Qualification
1	Westmeath	3	3	0	0	3–62	4–39	+20	6	Advance to quarter-finals
2	Offaly	3	2	0	1	5–47	4–53	−3	4	Advance to quarter-finals
3	Kerry	3	1	0	2	3–52	4–54	−5	2	
4	Carlow	3	0	0	3	4–43	3–58	−12	0	Relegation to Christy Ring Cup

Knockout Stage

Quarter-finals
Dublin	2–19
Wexford	0–12
Westmeath	0–19
Galway	3–27
Offaly	3–22
Laois	2–14

Semi-finals
Dublin	0–16
Kilkenny	1–25
Galway	2–19
Offaly	2–9

Leinster Final
Kilkenny	1–26
Galway	0–22

Matches

===== Leinster Qualifier Group Round 1 =====
1 May 2016 Round 1	Kerry	2–19 – 0–17	Carlow	Austin Stack Park, Tralee
15:00	S Nolan (1-04 (0-03f)), J Egan (1-03), J Griffin (0-03), M Boyle, J Goulding, J Conway (0-02 each), D Collins, M O'Leary, D Dineen (0-01f) (0-01 each).	Report	M Kavanagh (0-08 (0-06f), JM Nolan (0-02), J Kavanagh, R Kelly, Seamus Murphy, Sean Murphy, J Doyle (0-01f), C Lawlor, HP O'Byrne (0-01 each)	Attendance: 1000 est. Referee: C Lyons (Cork)

1 May 2016 Round 1	Westmeath	2–22 – 1–11	Offaly	Cusack Park, Mullingar
15:00	E Price (1-05), N O'Brien (0-07 (0-05f)) D McNicholas (1-02), C Boyle (0-03), L Varley (0-02), D Egerton, A Devine, D Clinton (0-01 each).	Report	P Murphy (1-01), S Dooley (0-03 (0-03f)), S Ryan, S Kinsella, K Kiely (0-02 each), J Bergin (0-01 (0-01f)).	Attendance: 1000 est. Referee: S Cleere (Kilkenney)

===== Leinster Qualifier Group Round 2 =====
7 May 2016 Round 2	Kerry	1–13 – 1–18	Westmeath	Austin Stack Park, Tralee
	S Nolan (0-4f), M Boyle (1–1), J Goulding (0–2), P Lucid (0-2f), B O’Leary (0–2), J Egan (0–1), B Barrett (0–1).	Report	D McNicholas (1–3), N O’Brien (0–5, 4f), C Boyle (0–3), E Price (0–2), A Devine (0–1), R Greville (0–1), L Varley (0–1), A Clarke (0–1), B Murtagh (0–1).	Attendance: 1000 est. Referee: J Keenan (Wicklow)

7 May 2016 Round 2	Offaly	1–17 – 2–11	Carlow	O'Connor Park, Tullamore
	S Dooley (1–10, 6f, 1 ’65, 1 sideline), J Bergin (0-02, 1f), J Mulrooney (0-02), P Murphy (0-02), K Connolly (0-01).	Report	S Murphy (1-01), R Smithers (1-00), J Doyle (0-03), D Murphy (0-02, 1f), K McDonald (0-02, 1f), D Byrne (0-01), JM Nolan (0-01), S Murphy (0-01).	Attendance: 950; Referee: J McGrath (Westmeath)

===== Leinster Qualifier Group Round 3 =====
22 May 2016 Round 3	Offaly	3–19 – 0–20	Kerry	O'Connor Park, Tullamore
	S Dooley 1–10 (0-8f, 0–1 ’65, 0–1 s/line), J Bergin 2–2, K Connolly 0–2, S Kinsella, J Mulrooney, C Kiely, P Guinan & L Langton 0–1 each.	Report	S Nolan 0–8 (0-6f), B Barrett & J Egan 0–3 each, D Collins & J Griffin 0–2 each, J Diggins & T Casey 0–1 each.	Attendance: 1,500 est. Referee: P O'Dwyer (Carlow)

22 May 2016 Round 3	Carlow	2–15 – 0–22	Westmeath	Dr. Cullen Park, Carlow
	D Murphy 0–6 0-3f, Seamus Murphy, C Lawlor 1–1 each, Sen Murphy 0–3, J M Nolan, J Doyle 0–2 each.	Report	N O'Brien 0–8 0-5f, D McNicholas and B Murtagh 0–3 each, A Clarke, K Doyle, R Greville 0–2 each, N Mitchell, L Varley 0–1 each.	Attendance: 500 est. Referee: J Owens (Wexford)

==== Leinster Quarter-finals ====
Last year's Leinster champions receive a bye into the semi-finals. The remaining six teams (four seeded teams plus the qualifier group winners and runners-up) play in three quarter-finals. An informal system of promotion or relegation operates in this round; if a team from the qualifier group wins their quarter-final, they will be seeded in next year's Leinster championship and the beaten seeded team will compete in next year's Leinster qualifier group.

21 May 2016
Quarter-final

Dublin	2–19 0–12	Wexford
David Treacy 0–8 (7f, 1 65), Niall McMorrow 0–4, Darragh O’Connell & Eamon Dillon 1–0 each, Johnny McCaffrey, Daire Plunkett, Mark Schutte, David O’Callaghan, Chris Bennett, Ryan O’Dwyer & Paul Ryan 0–1 each.	Report	Conor McDonald 0–6 (4f), Liam Óg McGovern 0–4, Eoin Moore (65) & Harry Kehoe 0–1.

Croke Park, Dublin
Attendance: 13,066
Referee: F Horgan (Tipperary)

5 June 2016
Quarter-final

Westmeath	0–19 3–27	Galway
N O’Brien 0–12 (8f), A Devine 0–2, B Murtagh 0–2 (1f), N Mitchell 0–2, K Doyle 0–1.	Report	J Canning (0–8, 3f, 1 sideline, 1 ’65), J Flynn 1–3 (0-1f), C Whelan 1–1, C Cooney 0–4, J Cooney 1–0, C Mannion 0–2, David Burke 0–3, D Glennon 0–3, S Moloney 0–1, P Brehony 0–1, N Burke 0–1

Cusack Park, Mullingar
Referee: D Kirwan (Cork)

5 June 2016
Quarter-final

Offaly	3–22 2–14	Laois
S Dooley 1–11 (0-10fs, 1–0 pen, 0–1 65); J Bergin 1–1; S Kinsella 0–3; J Mulrooney 1–0; S Gardiner, P Murphy, S Ryan, K Connolly, C Kiely, S Cleary, L Langton 0–1 each.	Report	PJ Scully 1–3 (0-2fs, 1 65); C Dwyer 0–5; PJ Scully 1–0; N Foyle, S Maher (1f) 0–2 each; W Hyland, E Rowland (f) 0–1 each.

O'Connor Park, Tullamore
Referee: J Ryan (Tipperary)

==== Leinster Semi-finals ====
Last year's Leinster champions receive a bye into the semi-finals. They are joined by the winners of the three quarter-finals.

11 June 2016
19:00
Semi-final

Dublin	0–16 – 1–25	Kilkenny
D Treacy (0–11, 0–10 frees); D O’Callaghan (0–2); É Dillon, D Plunkett, P Ryan (0–1).	Report	TJ Reid (0–10, 0–7 frees, 0–1 ’65); JJ Farrell (1–5); C Buckley, W Walsh, M Fennelly (0–2); P Walsh, C Fogarty, L Ryan, C Fennelly (0–1).

O'Moore Park, Portlaoise
Attendance: 10,419
Referee: B Gavin (Offaly)

19 June 2016
15:30
Semi-final

Offaly	2–9 – 2–19	Galway
S Dooley (1–5, 1–0 pen, 0–4 frees), J Bergin (1–1), J Mulrooney (0–1), D. Mooney (0–1), P Murphy (0–1).	Report	J Canning (0–8, 0–06 frees, 0–1 '65), C Cooney (1–3), N Burke (1–0), David Burke (0–2), J Cooney (0–2), P Mannion (0–2), C Whelan (0–1), C Donnellan (0–1).

O'Moore Park, Portlaoise
Attendance: 6,121
Referee: C Lyons (Cork)

==== Leinster final ====
3 July 2016
16:00
Final

Kilkenny	1–26 – 0–22	Galway
TJ Reid 0–10 (0-7f, 1 65), J Farrell 1–4, R Hogan 0–5, C Fogarty 0–3, W Walsh 0–2, J Power 0–1, M Fennelly 0–1.	Report	J Canning 0–6 (0-6f), C Mannion 0–5, C Cooney 0–3, C Whelan 0–3, J Cooney 0–2, D Glennon 0–1, C Donnellan 0–1, A Smith 0–1.

Croke Park, Dublin
Attendance: 29,377
Referee: F. Horgan (Tipperary)

=== Munster Senior Hurling Championship ===
Quarter-final
Cork	0–13
Tipperary	0–22

Semi-finals
Clare	0–17
Waterford	1–21
Limerick	1–16
Tipperary	3–12

Munster final
Waterford	0–13
Tipperary	5–19

==== Munster Format ====
Five of the six Munster counties compete. Kerry qualify for the qualifier group of the Leinster championship. The competition is straight knock-out.

==== Munster Quarter-final ====
22 May 2016
16:00
Quarter-final

Tipperary	0–22 – 0–13	Cork
S Callanan 0–8 (4f), J O’Dwyer 0–7 (2f, 1 65), N McGrath 0–2, Pádraic Maher, B Maher, J McGrath, J Forde & K Bergin 0–1 each.	Report	P Horgan 0-4f, A Cadogan 0–3, C Lehane 0–2 (1f), C Murphy, B Lawton, S Harnedy & L O’Farrell 0–1 each.

Semple Stadium, Thurles
Attendance: 29,114
Referee: B Kelly (Westmeath)

==== Munster Semi-finals ====
5 June 2016
16:00
Semi-final

Clare	0–17 – 1–21	Waterford
C McGrath, C O’Connell (0–3, 2 frees each); P Collins, C Ryan (1 65’) (0–2 each); C Cleary, C Galvin, T Kelly, J Conlon, B Bugler, D Fitzgerald, D Reidy (0–1 each).	Report	Pauric Mahony (5 frees), A Gleeson (1 sideline) (0–6 each); M Shanahan (1–2); K Moran (0–3); D Fives, Shane Bennett, Philip Mahony, J Dillon (0–1 each).

Semple Stadium, Thurles
Attendance: 19,715
Referee: J Owens (Wexford)

19 June 2016
16:00
Semi-final

Tipperary	3–12 – 1–16	Limerick
S Callanan (1–6, 0–3 frees, 0–2 65s); M Breen (2–1); N McGrath (0–3); J McGrath, Pádraic Maher (0–1 each).	Report	S Dowling (0–9, 8 frees); T Morrissey (1–0); D Hannon (0–2); B Nash, C Lynch, G Hegarty, J Ryan, J Fitzgibbon (0–1 each).

Semple Stadium, Thurles
Attendance: 25,531
Referee: J McGrath (Westmeath)

==== Munster final ====
10 July 2016
16:00
Final

Waterford	0–13 – 5–19	Tipperary
Pauric Mahony (0–6, 4 frees); P. Curran (0–5, 3 frees); A. Gleeson (0–2, sidelines)	Report	S. Callanan (1–11, 8 frees, 1 65); J. McGrath (3–2, 1–0 pen); M. Breen (1–1); Pádraic Maher, N. McGrath, Patrick Maher, J. Forde, A. McCormack (0–1 each)

Gaelic Grounds, Limerick
Attendance: 26,508
Referee: Brian Gavin (Offaly)

=== Ulster Senior Hurling Championship ===
==== Bracket ====
Semi-finals; 19 June
Derry	0–14
Antrim	3–28
Armagh	4–12
Down	0–17

Ulster final 10 July
Antrim	6–21
Armagh	4–14
Relegation Playoff; 26 June
Derry	scr.
Down	w/o

==== Ulster Format ====
The top four Ulster counties compete in a stand alone championship. The rest of the Ulster counties compete in the shield. The competition is straight knock-out.

==== Ulster Semi-finals ====
19 June 2016
17:00
Semi-final

Derry	0–14 – 3–28	Antrim
	Report

Athletic Grounds, Armagh
19 June 2016
19:00
Semi-final

Armagh	4–12 – 0–17	Down
	Report

Athletic Grounds, Armagh

==== Ulster Final ====
10 July 2016
Final

Antrim	6–21 – 4–14	Armagh
C Clarke 2-07 (3f), J Connolly 2-02, J Dillon 1-02, C Carson 1-01, B McCarry, D McKernan 0-03 each, J McKeague, E McCloskey 0-01 each, C McNaughton 0-01 (f)	Report	E McGuinness 2-02, R Gaffney 0-07 (7f), J King, D Coulter 1-00 each, F Bradley, C Carvill 0-02 each, C Corvan 0-01

Owenbeg, Dungiven
Referee: E. Hassan (Derry)

== Cup competitions ==
=== Christy Ring Cup (Tier 2) ===
==== Finals ====
4 June 2016 Final	Meath	2–17 – 1–20	Antrim	Croke Park, Dublin
17:30	N Heffernan, S Quigley 1–1 each, J Toher 0–5 (5f), A Gannon, J Keena 0–3 each, K Keoghan 0–2, S Heavey, K Keena 0–1 each.	Report	C Johnston 1–2, C Clarke 0–5 (1f, 1 '65), J Connolly 0–4, E McCloskey, N McKenna 0–3 each, E Campbell, C McKinley, S McAfee 0–1 each.	Referee: J O'Brien (Tipperary)

25 June 2016 Replayed Final	Meath	4–21 – 5–17 (AET)	Antrim	Croke Park, Dublin
	J Toher 0–12 (0–11 fs); N Heffernan 2–0, S Clynch 1–3 (0–2 fs), G McGowan 1–0, A Gannon, S Quigley 0–2, S Morris, J Keena 0–1.	Report	C Clarke 1–5 (0–1 f; 0–1 65), N McKenna 1–5, C Johnston 1–2, D Hamill, J Connolly 1–0, D McKiernan 0–2, N Elliott, E Campbell, S McAfee 0–1.	Attendance: 2,938; Referee: C McAllister (Cork)

=== Nicky Rackard Cup (Tier 3) ===
==== Final ====
4 June 2016 Final	Mayo	2–16 – 1–15	Armagh	Croke Park, Dublin
15.30	K Feeney 1–9 (0-6f), D McTigue 1–0, S Regan, F Boland 0–2 each, S Boland, J McManus, C Scahill 0–1 each.	Report	E McGuinness 1–1, D Coulter 0–5, R Gaffney 0–4 (3f, 1 ’65), D Carvill, C Corvan 0–2 each, C Carvill 0–1.	Referee: J Murphy (Limerick)

=== Lory Meagher Cup (Tier 4) ===
==== Group stage ====
Pos	Team	Pld	W	D	L	SF	SA	Diff	Pts	Qualification
1	Louth	4	4	0	0	6–67	4–47	+26	8	Advance to Final
2	Sligo	4	3	0	1	7–80	5–53	+33	6	Advance to Final
3	Warwickshire	4	2	0	2	15–56	9–58	+16	4	
4	Leitrim	4	1	0	3	6–50	6–67	−17	2	
5	Lancashire	4	0	0	4	4–46	13–74	−55	0	

==== Final ====
4 June 2016
1.30 PM

Louth	4–15 – 4–11	Sligo
Dwan (1–4, 1-2f), Murphy (0–7, 6f, 1'65), Mackin (1–2), Callan, Conneely (1–1 each)		O'Kelly-Lynch (2-02), Davey, K. Gilmartin (1–0 each), Kenny (0–3, 1f), O'Loughlin (0–3), Raymond (0–2, 1f), Cox (0–1)

Croke Park, Dublin
Referee: Mick Murtagh (Westmeath)

== All-Ireland qualifiers ==
=== Bracket ===
Round 1
Wexford	1–21
Offaly	1–13
Cork	1–26
Dublin	1–23
Westmeath	0–18
Limerick	1–24
Clare	5–32
Laois	0–12

Round 2
Wexford	0–23
Cork	1–17
Limerick	0–15
Clare	0–19

All-Ireland Quarter-finals
Wexford
Clare

- All qualifier matches are knock-out.

=== Qualifiers Round 1 ===
==== Qualifiers Round 1 Format ====
The eight teams beaten in the quarter-finals and semi-finals of the Leinster (5 teams) and Munster (3 teams) provincial championships play in four matches. A draw is made that ensures there are three matches between Leinster and Munster teams and one match between two Leinster teams.

==== Qualifiers Round 1 Matches ====
2 July 2016 Round 1	Wexford	1–21 – 1–13	Offaly	Innovate Wexford Park, Wexford
15:30	C McDonald 0–11 (8fs), P Doran 0–4, P Morris 1–0, L Chin 0–2 (1f), D O'Keefe 0–2, L McGovern 0–1, D Dunne 0–1.	Report	S Dooley 0–7 (6fs), O Kelly 1–0, S Kinsella 0–2, S Ryan 0–1, J Bergin 0–1, P Guinan 0–1, P Murphy 0–1.	Attendance: 3,100; Referee: J. Ryan (Tipperary)

2 July 2016 Round 1	Westmeath	0–18 – 1–24	Limerick	Cusack Park, Mullingar
17:00	N O’Brien 0–11 (8fs, 1 sideline), A Clarke 0–2, B Murtagh 0–2 (1f), A Craig 0–1, A Devine 0–1, C Boyle 0–1.	Report	S Dowling 0–14 (10fs, 265s), D Hannon 0–3, G Mulcahy 1–0, K Downes 0–3, J Ryan 0–1, D O’Donovan 0–1, P Browne 0–1, D Reidy 0–1.	Attendance: 2,387; Referee: A. Kelly (Galway)

2 July 2016 Round 1	Clare	5–32 – 0–12	Laois	Cusack Park, Ennis
19:00	A Shanagher 3–1, T Kelly 0–10 (3fs), P Collins 1–3, S O’Donnell 1–3, C O’Connell 0–5 (4fs), D McInerney 0–3, C Galvin 0–2, J Conlon 0–2, C Cleary 0–2, S Golden 0–1.	Report	W Hyland (0–3, 0–3 frees), E Rowland (0–2 frees), C Dwyer (0–2 each); M Whelan, PJ Scully (0–1 free), W Dunphy, M Kavanagh, N Foyle (0–1 each)	Attendance: 5,518; Referee: B. Kelly (Westmeath)

2 July 2016 Round 1	Cork	1–26 – 1–23	Dublin	Páirc Uí Rinn, Cork
19:00	P. Horgan (0–12, 8 frees); A. Cadogan (1–5); C. Lehane (0–3); D. Kearney (0–2); L. O’Farrell, W. Egan, B. Lawton, B. Cooper (0–1 each).	Report	D. Treacy (0–9, 7 frees, 1 65); P. Ryan (frees), C. Bennett (0–4 each); E. Dillon (1–0); N. McMorrow, S. Barrett (0–2 each); J. McCaffrey, C. Crummey (0–1 each).	Attendance: 10,058; Referee: P. O'Dwyer (Carlow)

=== Qualifiers Round 2 ===
==== Qualifiers Round 2 Format ====
The four winners of round 1 play in two matches. The draw was made on 4 July. Teams who have already met in the Leinster or Munster championships cannot be drawn to meet again.

==== Qualifiers Round 2 Matches ====
9 July 2016 Round 2	Cork	1–17 – 0–23	Wexford	Semple Stadium, Thurles
17:00	P Horgan 0–7 (6f), C Lehan 0–3, L O’Farrell 0–3, D Kearney 1–0, B Cooper 0–1, W Egan 0–1, S Harnedy 0–1, A Cadagon 0–1.	Report	C McDonald 0–13 (10f), L chin 0–4, L Og McGovern 0–2, J O’Connor 0–1, P Morris 0–1, E Moore 0–1 (1f), M Fanning 0–1 (1f)	Attendance: 15,540; Referee: B. Kelly (Westmeath)

9 July 2016 Round 2	Clare	0–19 – 0–15	Limerick	Semple Stadium, Thurles
19:00	T Kelly 0–9 (5f, 1 65, 0–1 pen), P Collins & S O’Donnell 0–3 each, D McInerney, J Browne, J Conlon & A Shanagher 0–1 each.	Report	S Dowling 0–6 (5f, 1 65), D Byrnes 0–3, J Ryan 0–2, D O’Donovan, P Browne, K Downes & G Hegarty 0–1 each.	Attendance: 15,540; Referee: J. Owens (Wexford)

== All-Ireland Senior Hurling Championship ==
=== Bracket ===
Quarter-finals; 24 July
Waterford	0–21
Wexford	0–11
Galway	2–17
Clare	0–17

Semi-finals; 7 / 13 / 14 August
Kilkenny	1–21, 2–19
Waterford	0–24, 2–17
Tipperary	2–19
Galway	2–18

All-Ireland final 4 September
Kilkenny	2–20
Tipperary	2–29

=== All-Ireland Quarter-finals ===
The beaten finalists from the Leinster and Munster championships play the winners of round 2 of the qualifiers.

24 July 2016
14:00
Quarter-final

Waterford	0–21 – 0–11	Wexford
Pauric Mahony 0–8 (6f), A Gleeson 0–2, J Barron 0–2, S Bennett 0–2, M Walsh 0–2, M Shanahan 0–2, B O’Halloran 0–2, J Dillon 0–1	Report	C McDonald 0–5 (4f), L Chin 0–2, É Martin 0–1, L Ryan 0–1, J O’Connor 0–1, D Dunne 0–1

Semple Stadium, Thurles
Attendance: 31,690
Referee: A Kelly (Galway)

24 July 2016
16:00
Quarter-final

Galway	2–17 – 0–17	Clare
J Canning (1–8, 0–6 frees, 2 65s); C Cooney (1–0); J Cooney, David Burke (0–2 each); J Coen, P Mannion, C Donnellan, C Mannion, A Harte (0–1 each).	Report	T Kelly (0–7, 6 frees); C Galvin (0–5); C McGrath, C Ryan (frees) (0–2 each); D McInerney (0–1).

Semple Stadium, Thurles
Attendance: 31,690
Referee: Brian Gavin (Offaly)

=== All-Ireland Semi-finals ===
The Leinster and Munster champions play the winners of the two quarter-finals.

7 August 2016
15:30
Semi-final

Kilkenny	1–21 – 0–24	Waterford
TJ Reid 0–11 (0-10f, 0–1 ’65), W Walsh 1–1, R Hogan 0–4, C Fogarty 0–2, E Larkin, M Fennelly, C Fennelly 0–1 each.	Report	Pauric Mahony 0–14 (0-10f, 0–1 ’65), A Gleeson 0–5, J Dillon 0–2, K Moran, P Curran, M Shanahan 0–1 each.

Croke Park, Dublin
Attendance: 34,432
Referee: J Owens (Wexford)
13 August 2016
18:45
Semi-final replay

Kilkenny	2–19 – 2–17	Waterford
C Fennelly 2–1, TJ Reid 0–7 (6fs), R Hogan 0–4, L Blanchfield 0–3, P Walsh 0–2, E Larkin 0–1, W Walsh 0–1.	Report	Pauric Mahony 0–9 (7fs), A Gleeson 1–2, J Dillon 1–0, Shane Bennett 0–2, J Barron 0–2, M Shanahan 0–2.

Semple Stadium, Thurles
Attendance: 30,058
Referee: James McGrath (Westmeath)
14 August 2016
15:30
Semi-final

Tipperary	2–19 – 2–18	Galway
S Callanan 0–9 (0-8f, 0–1 ’65), J McGrath 1–1, J O'Dwyer 1–0, N McGrath, M Breen 0–3 each, R Maher, P Maher, B Maher 0–1 each.	Report	C Cooney 1–7 (0-5f), J Canning 0–5 (0-3f, 0–1 ’65), J Cooney 1–1, C Whelan 0–2, S Maloney, D Burke, J Flynn 0–1 each.

Croke Park, Dublin
Attendance: 54,227
Referee: B Kelly (Westmeath)

=== All-Ireland final ===
4 September 2016
15:30
Final

Kilkenny	2–20 – 2–29	Tipperary
TJ Reid (0–11, 0-10f, 0-01 65), K Kelly (1-02), R Hogan (1-01), E Larkin (0-02), P Walsh (0-02), W Walsh (0-01), C Buckley (0-01).	Report	S Callanan (0–13, 0-03f, 1 65), J O'Dwyer (1-05, 1 sideline, 0-01f), J McGrath (1-03), Patrick Maher (0-02), J Forde (0-02), S Kennedy (0-01), Pádraic Maher (0-01), D McCormack (0-01), N McGrath (0-01).

Croke Park, Dublin
Attendance: 82,016
Referee: B Gavin (Offaly)

== Championship statistics ==
=== Top scorers ===
==== Overall ====
Rank	Player	County	Tally	Total	Matches	Average
1	Shane Dooley	Offaly	4–46	58	6	9.67
2	Séamus Callanan	Tipperary	2–47	53	5	10.60
3	T.J. Reid	Kilkenny	0–49	49	5	9.80
4	Niall O'Brien	Westmeath	0–43	43	5	8.60
4	Pauric Mahony	Waterford	0–43	43	5	8.60
6	Joe Canning	Galway	1–35	38	5	7.60
7	Conor McDonald	Wexford	0–35	35	4	8.75
8	Shane Dowling	Limerick	0–29	29	3	9.66
9	David Treacy	Dublin	0–28	28	3	9.33
10	Tony Kelly	Clare	0–27	27	4	6.75

==== In a single game ====
Rank	Player	County	Tally	Total	Opposition
1	Shane Dooley	Offaly	1–11	14	Laois
1	Séamus Callanan	Tipperary	1–11	14	Waterford
1	Shane Dowling	Limerick	1–11	14	Westmeath
1	Pauric Mahony	Waterford	0–14	14	Kilkenny
5	Shane Dooley	Offaly	1–10	13	Carlow
5	Shane Dooley	Offaly	1–10	13	Kerry
5	Conor McDonald	Wexford	0–13	13	Cork
5	Séamus Callanan	Tipperary	0–13	13	Kilkenny
9	Niall O'Brien	Westmeath	0–12	12	Galway
9	Patrick Horgan	Cork	0–12	12	Dublin

=== Clean sheets ===
Rank	Goalkeeper	County	Clean sheets
1	Eoin Murphy	Kilkenny	3
2	Darren Gleeson	Tipperary	2
2	Anthony Nash	Cork	2
2	Andrew Fahy	Clare	2
2	Nickie Quaid	Limerick	2
2	Colm Callanan	Galway	2
7	Aiden McCabe	Kerry	1
7	Paddy Maloney	Westmeath	1
7	James Dempsey	Offaly	1
7	Dean Grennan	Carlow	1
7	Conor Dooley	Dubin	1
7	Stephen O'Keeffe	Waterford	1

=== Scoring events ===
Widest winning margin: 35 points

- Clare 5–32 – 0–12 Laois (Qualifier round 1)

Most goals in a match: 5

- Clare 5–32 – 0–12 Laois (Qualifier round 1)
- Offaly 3–22 – 2–14 Laois (Leinster quarter-final)
- Tipperary 5–19 – 0–13 Waterford (Munster Final)

Most points in a match: 49

- Cork 1–26 – 1–23 Dublin (Qualifier round 1)
- Tipperary 2–29 – 2–20 Kilkenny (All-Ireland Final)

Most goals by one team in a match: 5

- Clare 5–32 – 0–12 Laois (Qualifier round 1)
- Tipperary 5–19 – 0–13 Waterford (Munster Final)

Highest aggregate score: 61

- Tipperary 2–29 – 2–20 Kilkenny (All-Ireland Final)

Lowest aggregate score: 34

- Clare 0–19 – 0–15 Limerick (Qualifier Round 2)

Most goals scored by a losing team: 2

- Offaly 1–17 – 2–11 Carlow (Leinster round robin)
- Westmeath 0–22 – 2–15 Carlow (Leinster round robin)
- Tipperary 2–29 – 2–20 Kilkenny (All-Ireland Final)

== Miscellaneous ==
- Kerry are the first team from Munster to play in the Leinster Championship and was their first in the senior championship since 2004. Their round 3 qualifier group match against Offaly on 22 May was the first ever championship meeting between the two teams.
- On 1 May 2016 Westmeath defeated Offaly in the championship for the first time since 1976. Their opening Leinster qualifier group game was also their first championship meeting since then.
- The draw between Kilkenny and Waterford on 7 August was the first time a replay was required to decide an All-Ireland semi-final since 2003, when Wexford an Cork played out a 3–17 to 2–20 tie.
- Tipperary's defeat of Waterford by 21 points in the Munster final is the biggest Munster final win since 1972.
- Tipperary's victory in the All-Ireland marks their second title of the 2010s, making it the first decade since the 1960s in which the county has won multiple All-Ireland titles, having only won one title each in the 1970s, 1980s, 1990s and 2000s.

=== 2016 Referees ===
Sean Cleere – Kilkenny

Brian Gavin – Offaly

Fergal Horgan – Tipperary

John Keenan – Wicklow

Alan Kelly – Galway

Barry Kelly – Westmeath

Diarmuid Kirwan – Cork

Colm Lyons – Cork

James McGrath – Westmeath

Paud O'Dwyer – Carlow

James Owens – Wexford

Johnny Ryan – Tipperary

=== Attendances ===
Highest attendances:

- Tipperary 2-29 – 2-20 Kilkenny (Croke Park) – 82,016
- Tipperary 2–19 – 2–18 Galway (Croke Park) – 54,227
- Kilkenny 1–21 – 0–24 Waterford (Croke Park) – 34,432
- Galway 2–17 – 0–17 Clare (Semple Stadium) – 31,690
- Waterford 0–21 – 0–11 Wexford (Semple Stadium) – 31,690
- Kilkenny 2–19 – 2–17 Waterford (Semple Stadium) – 30,358
- Kilkenny 1–26 – 0–22 Galway (Croke Park) – 29,377
- Tipperary 0–22 – 0–13 Cork (Semple Stadium) – 29,114
- Tipperary 5–19 – 0–13 Waterford (Gaelic Grounds) – 26,508
- Tipperary 3–12 – 1–16 Limerick (Semple Stadium) – 25,531
- Clare 0–17 – 1–21 Waterford (Semple Stadium) – 19,715
- Cork 1–17 – 0–23 Wexford (Semple Stadium) – 15,540
- Clare 0–19 – 0–15 Limerick (Semple Stadium) – 15,540
- Dublin 2–19 – 0–12 Wexford (Croke Park) – 13,066
- Dublin 0–16 – 1–25 Kilkenny (O' Moore Park) – 10,419
- Cork 1–26 – 1–23 Dublin (Páirc Uí Rinn) – 10,058

Total attendance: 486,553
Average attendance: 24,328

== Broadcasting ==
Matches will be broadcast live on television in Ireland on RTÉ and Sky Sports, and in the United Kingdom on Sky Sports. Worldwide coverage will be provided on GAAGO.

RTÉ coverage will be shown on RTÉ One on The Sunday Game Live presented by Michael Lyster in high definition. Des Cahill will present The Sunday Game highlights and analysis show on Sunday evening.

These matches were broadcast live on television in Ireland

Round	RTÉ	Sky Sports
Munster Championship	Tipperary vs Cork; Waterford vs Clare; Tipperary vs Limerick; Tipperary vs Waterford	
Leinster Championship	Dublin vs Wexford; Kilkenny vs Galway	Kilkenny vs Dublin
Qualifiers	Wexford vs Offaly	Cork vs Dublin; Cork vs Wexford; Clare vs Limerick
Quarter-finals	Waterford vs Wexford; Clare vs Galway	
Semi-finals	Kilkenny vs Waterford; Kilkenny vs Waterford (replay); Tipperary vs Galway	Kilkenny vs Waterford; Kilkenny vs Waterford (replay); Tipperary vs Galway
Final	Kilkenny vs Tipperary	Kilkenny vs Tipperary

== Awards ==
Sunday Game Team of the Year

The Sunday Game team of the year was picked on 4 September, which was the night of the final. The panel consisting of Brendan Cummins, Henry Shefflin, Michael Duignan, Ger Loughnane, Liam Sheedy, Eddie Brennan and Cyril Farrell selected Tipperary's Séamus Callanan as the Sunday game player of the year. Other players nominated were Padraic Maher and John McGrath of Tipperary.

- Eoin Murphy (Kilkenny)
- Cathal Barrett (Tipperary)
- James Barry (Tipperary)
- Daithí Burke (Galway)
- Padraig Walsh (Kilkenny)
- Ronan Maher (Tipperary)
- Padraic Maher (Tipperary)
- Jamie Barron (Waterford)
- David Burke (Galway)
- Walter Walsh (Kilkenny)
- Austin Gleeson (Waterford)
- Patrick Maher (Tipperary)
- Richie Hogan (Kilkenny)
- Seamus Callanan (Tipperary)
- John McGrath (Tipperary)

All Star Team of the Year

On 4 November, the 2016 All Star Award winners were announced at the awards ceremony in the National Convention Centre in Dublin. Austin Gleeson of Waterford was named as the All Stars Hurler of the Year and the All Stars Young Hurler of the Year.

- Eoin Murphy (Kilkenny)
- Cathal Barrett (Tipperary)
- James Barry (Tipperary)
- Daithí Burke (Galway)
- Padraig Walsh (Kilkenny)
- Ronan Maher (Tipperary)
- Padraic Maher (Tipperary)
- Jamie Barron (Waterford)
- David Burke (Galway)
- Walter Walsh (Kilkenny)
- Austin Gleeson (Waterford)
- Patrick Maher (Tipperary)
- Richie Hogan (Kilkenny)
- Seamus Callanan (Tipperary)
- John McGrath (Tipperary)

== See also ==
- 2016 Ulster Senior Hurling Championship
- 2016 Christy Ring Cup
- 2016 Nicky Rackard Cup
- 2016 Lory Meagher Cup
