= 2012 National Hurling League =

81st season of the National Hurling League

National Hurling League 2012
League details
- Dates: 25 February – 6 May 2012
- Teams: 34

League champions
- Winners: Kilkenny (15th win)
- Captain: Eoin Larkin
- Manager: Brian Cody

League runners-up
- Runners-up: Cork
- Captain: Patrick Horgan
- Manager: Jimmy Barry-Murphy

Other division winners
- Division 1B: Clare
- Division 2A: Carlow
- Division 2B: Kildare
- Division 3A: Fingal
- Division 3B: Fermanagh

The 2012 National Hurling League commenced in February 2012. 34 GAA county hurling teams: 32 from Ireland (including Fingal but not Cavan), London and Warwickshire, contested it.

On 6 May Kilkenny defeated Cork in the final to win their 15th NHL title, moving them to second place in the all-time roll of honour, behind Tipperary who have won 19 Leagues.

== Format ==
The 2012 format was originally to consist of five divisions: Divisions 1 and 2 having eight teams in each, Division 3A six, Division 3B seven, and six teams in Division 4.

However, this was controversially altered to a system of six divisions, with six teams in divisions 1A, 1B, 2A, 2B and 3A, and four in division 3B. This meant that many counties were effectively relegated to a lower division. It was agreed in October 2011 that there would no longer be an eight-team Division 1, with the top division hurling counties giving their approval to the new system. The league settings are as follows:

- Division 1A: Top three teams qualify for NHL semi-finals. Bottom two teams play a relegation playoff, with the losing team relegated.
- Division 1B: Top two teams play division final, with the winner being promoted and qualifying for NHL semi-final. Bottom two teams play a relegation playoff, with the losing team relegated.
- Division 2A: Top two teams play division final, with the winner being promoted. Bottom two teams play a relegation playoff, with the losing team relegated.
- Division 2B: Top two teams play division final, with the winner being promoted. No relegation.
- Division 3A: Top two teams play division final, but the winner is not promoted. Bottom two teams play a relegation playoff, with the losing team relegated.
- Division 3B: Top two teams play division final, with the winner being promoted.

== Division 1A ==
=== Division 1A ===
NHL semi-finalists Relegated team

Team	Pld	W	D	L	F	A	Diff	Pts
Kilkenny	5	4	0	1	13-95	8-69	41	8
Cork	5	3	1	1	9-88	6-90	7	7
Tipperary	5	2	2	1	2-87	8-65	4	6
Waterford	5	2	0	3	4-79	5-98	-22	4
Galway	5	2	0	3	4-81	8-86	-17	4
Dublin	5	0	1	4	10-70	7-92	-13	1

- Waterford are placed ahead of Galway as they won the head-to-head match between the teams.

==== Fixtures and results ====
25 February 2012 Round 1	Cork	3-17 - 0-18	Waterford	Páirc Uí Rinn, Cork
19:00	C Lehane 0-07, P O'Sullivan 2-01, P Horgan 0-04, C Naughton 1-01, B O'Connor, D Sweetnam, P Cronin, S Óg Ó hAilpín 0-01 each.	Report	M O'Neill 0-05, P Mahony 0-04, G O'Brien 0-02, P O'Brien, K Moran, J Nagle, K Casey, S Prendergast, E McGrath, T Ryan 0-01 each.	Attendance: 7,356; Referee: B Kelly (Westmeath)

26 February 2012 Round 1	Kilkenny	2-17 - 0-15	Tipperary	Nowlan Park, Kilkenny
14:30	R Power 1-11 (1-00 pen, 0-10f, 0-01 '65'), E Larkin 1-02, M Rice 0-02, M Ruth, TJ Reid 0-01 each.	Report	P Bourke 0-06 (0-05f, 0-01 '65'), N McGrath, S Bourke 0-03 each, C O'Mahony (0-01f), B Maher, E Kelly 0-01 each	Attendance: 10,664; Referee: M Wadding (Waterford)

26 February 2012 Round 1	Galway	0-20 - 0-13	Dublin	Pearse Stadium, Galway
14:30	N Burke (0-10, 3fs, 2'65); C Cooney (0-04); J Regan (0-03); C Donnellan (0-01); I Tannian (0-01); D Hayes (0-01).	Report	P Ryan (0-06, 5fs, 1'65); C McCormack (0-02); R O'Dwyer (0-02fs); S Durkin (0-01); D Sutcliffe (0-01); L Rushe (0-01).	Attendance: 3,241; Referee: D Kirwan (Cork)

11 March 2012 Round 2	Dublin	2-17 - 2-18	Cork	Croke Park, Dublin
14:00	P Ryan 0-8 (2 ’65, 2f), S Lambert 1-2, D Sutcliffe 0-4, R O’Dwyer 1-0, J Boland 0-2, L Rushe 0-1.	Report	P Horgan 0-7 (5f), P Cronin 1-3, C Naughton 1-1, C Lehane 0-3, P O’Sullivan 0-2, B O’Connor 0-1, W Egan 0-1.	Referee: J McGrath (Westmeath)

11 March 2012 Round 2	Waterford	1-15 - 2-21	Kilkenny	Walsh Park, Waterford
14:30	M Shanahan 1-3, M O’Neill 0-6 (4fs), G O’Brien, T Browne (1f) 0-2 each; S Prendergast, Paudie Mahony (f) 0-1 each.	Report	R Power 0-10 (8fs), M Ruth 2-1, E Larkin 0-3, R Hogan, C Fennelly, TJ Reid (1 sideline) 0-2 each, M Fennelly 0-1.	Referee: J Sexton (Cork)

11 March 2012 Round 2	Tipperary	2-20 - 2-18	Galway	Semple Stadium, Thurles
14:30	P Bourke 1-6 (0-5f), N McGrath 1-3 (0-1f), J Woodlock, B Maher, J O’Neill & S Bourke 0-2 each, C O’Mahony (65), B O’Meara, J Ryan 0-1 each.	Report	N Burke 0-7f, D Hayes 1-3, J Regan 1-2, C Cooney 0-3 (1f), B Burke 0-2, B Daly 0-1.	Referee: C McAllister (Cork)

18 March 2012 Round 3	Cork	2-13 - 2-17	Galway	Páirc Uí Chaoimh, Cork
12:45	P Horgan 0-6 (0-6f), C Lehane 0-5, C Naughton, L McLoughlin 1-0 each, P O’Sullivan, J Coughlan 0-1 each.	Report	N Burke 1-10 (0-7f), D Hayes 1-1, A Smith, D Burke 0-2 each, D Glennon 0-1.	Attendance: 12,821; Referee: J Owens (Wexford)

18 March 2012 Round 3	Kilkenny	5-16 - 6-12	Dublin	Nowlan Park, Kilkenny
14:30	R. Power 1-8 (5fs, 1 65), R Hogan 1-3, A Fogarty 1-1, M Ruth, C Fennelly 1-0 each, E Larkin 0-3, TJ Reid 0-1.	Report	D Sutcliffe 2-3, P Ryan 1-3 (2fs), A McCrabbe 0-4 (3fs), C McCormack, E Dillon, D O’Callaghan 1-0 each, L Rushe, M O’Brien 0-1 each.	Attendance: 5,571; Referee: B Kelly (Westmeath)

18 March 2012 Round 3	Tipperary	0-31 - 2-15	Waterford	Semple Stadium, Thurles
14:30	N McGrath 0-7 (0-1f); P Bourke 0-7 (0-4f); B O’Meara 0-3; P Maher 0-2; B Maher 0-2; J Woodlock 0-2; J O’Neill 0-2; S Bourke 0-2; S McGrath 0-2; J Ryan, T Stapleton, 0-1 each.	Report	M Shanahan 1-4 (1-0p, 0-1f); M O’Neill 0-4 (4f); S Molumphy 1-0; S O’Sullivan 0-2; G O’Brien, S Walsh, J Nagle, K Moran, E McGrath, 0-1 each.	Referee: J McGrath (Westmeath)

24 March 2012 Round 4	Dublin	2-15 - 0-21	Tipperary	Croke Park, Dublin
	D Treacy, L Rushe both 1-2, A McCrabbe 0-3 (2f), R Dwyer, D Sutcliffe, N McMorrow all 0-2, J McCaffrey, D O’Callaghan both 0-1	Report	P Bourke 0-6 (5f), B O’Meara 0-5, N McGrath 0-4 (2f), J O’Brien 0-2, S Bourke, J Ryan, S McGrath, B Maher all 0-1	Referee: B Gavin (Offaly)

25 March 2012 Round 4	Galway	0-16 - 1-14	Waterford	Pearse Stadium, Galway
	N Burke 0-5 (0-3f), D Burke 0-3, A Smith, B Daly 0-2 each, C Cooney, N Donoghue, B Flaherty 0-1 each.	Report	P Mahony 0-9 (0-9f), S Walsh 1-2, J Mullane 0-2, M Shanahan 0-1.	Referee: A Stapleton (Laois)

25 March 2012 Round 4	Cork	1-17 - 1-15	Kilkenny	Páirc Uí Chaoimh, Cork
	P Horgan (0-8, 0-7f), P O’Sullivan (1-1), C Naughton (0-2), W Egan (0-2, 0-1 65, 0-1f), D Sweetnam (0-1); C Lehane (0-1), P Cronin (0-1), J Coughlan (0-1).	Report	R Power (1-11, 0-9f), R Hogan (0-2), M Rice (0-1); TJ Reid (0-1).	Referee: M Wadding

1 April 2012 Round 5	Waterford	0-17 - 0-13	Dublin	Fraher Field, Dungarvan
14:30	M Shanahan (0-4,0-2f), G O'Brien (0-4), P Mahony (0-3f);, J Mullane (0-2), S Walsh (0-1), T Browne (0-1), K Moran (0-1), E Kelly (0-1).	Report	D Tracey (0-4,0-3f), E Dillon (0-3), R O'Carroll (0-2), D Sutcliffe (0-1), R O'Dwyer (0-1), J McCaffery (0-1f), N McMorrow (0-1).

1 April 2012 Round 5	Kilkenny	3-26 - 0-10	Galway	Nowlan Park, Kilkenny
14:30	E Larkin 1-7 (5fs), TJ Reid 1-6, M Ruth 1-1, M Rice, C Fennelly 0-3 each, M Fennelly, R Hogan (1f) 0-2 each, A Fogarty, M Bergin 0-1 each.	Report	N Burke 0-5fs, A Smith 0-2, T Regan, C Donnellan, A Harte 0-1 each.

1 April 2012 Round 5	Tipperary	1-23 - 1-23	Cork	Semple Stadium, Thurles
14:30	P Bourke (1-6, 1-2f), N McGrath (0-5), J O’Brien (0-3), S Bourke (0-3), G Ryan (0-2), J Woodlock (0-1), P Maher (0-1), T Stapleton (0-1), E Kelly (0-1).	Report	P Horgan (0-9, 3f), C Lehane (1-2), C Naughton (0-4), D Sweetnam (0-3), J Coughlan (0-2), W Egan (0-1f), P Cronin (0-1), J Gardiner (0-1).

== Division 1 Knockout ==
15 April 2012 Relegation play-off	Galway	0-26 - 2-20 (aet)	Dublin	O'Connor Park, Tullamore
14:30	J Canning 0-12 (6f); N Burke 0-5 (4f); C Donnellan 0-2; D Hayes 0-2; D Burke, C Cooney, J Coen, J Glynn, J Regan, 0-1.	Report	P Ryan 0-9 (8f, 1 65); D Sutcliffe 0-3; N McMorrow 0-3 (1f, 1 65); C McCormack 1-0; R O’Carroll 1-0; J McCaffrey, A McCrabbe (65), S Lambert, D Plunkett, D Treacy, 0-1.

21 April 2012 Relegation play-off replay	Dublin	0-19 - 4-21	Galway	O'Moore Park, Portlaoise
16:00	P Ryan (0-11, 8f), M Quilty (0-3), C McCormack (0-2), J McCaffrey (0-1), D Treacy (0-1), J Boland (0-1)	Report	J Canning (2-7, 1-6f), D Burke (1-3), N Burke (0-4), D Glennon (1-2), C Donnellan (0-2) D Hayes (0-1), I Tannian (0-1), J Coen (0-1).	Referee: J Sexton (Cork)

22 April 2012 Semi-final	Kilkenny	1-20 - 0-14	Clare	Semple Stadium, Thurles
14:00	M Ruth 1-3, R Power 0-9 (7f), C Fennelly 0-4, J Mulhall, E Larkin, K Joyce, TJ Reid 0-1 each.	Report	C McGrath 0-6 (5f), C Ryan 0-3 (2f), N O’Connell 0-2 (2f), L Markham, P Donnellan, S Collins 0-1 each.	Attendance: 15,424; Referee: Alan kelly

22 April 2012 Semi-final	Cork	1-25 - 2-15	Tipperary	Semple Stadium, Thurles
16:00	L O’Farrell 1-02, P Horgan 0-09 (6f), N McCarthy, W Egan (2f) 0-03 each, P Cronin, C Lehane 0-02 each, J Gardiner, P O’Sullivan, D Sweetnam, A Nash 0-01 each.	Report	B O’Meara 1-02, E Kelly 1-01 (1-01f), P Bourke 0-07 (5f), J Woodlock, G Ryan, N McGrath, S Bourke, J O’Brien 0-01 each.	Attendance: 15,424; Referee: M Wadding (Waterford)

6 May 2012 Final	Kilkenny	3-21 — 0-16	Cork	Semple Stadium, Thurles
		Report		Attendance: 16,117; Referee: J McGrath (Westmeath)

=== Top scorers ===
==== Season ====
Rank	Player	County	Tally	Total	Matches	Average
1	Richie Power	Kilkenny	3-49	58	5	11.60
2	Niall Burke	Galway	1-47	50	7	7.14
3	Pa Bourke	Tipperary	2-38	44	6	7.33
4	Patrick Horgan	Cork	0-43	43	6	7.16

==== Single game ====
Rank	Player	County	Tally	Total	Opposition
1	Richie Power	Kilkenny	1-11	14	Cork
1	Richie Power	Kilkenny	1-11	14	Tipperary
3	Joe Canning	Galway	2-7	13	Dublin
3	Niall Burke	Galway	1-10	13	Cork
5	Joe Canning	Galway	0-12	12	Dublin
6	Paul Ryan	Dublin	0-11	11	Galway
6	Richie Power	Kilkenny	1-8	11	Dublin
8	Eoin Larkin	Kilkenny	1-7	10	Galway
8	Niall Burke	Galway	0-10	10	Dublin
8	Richie Power	Kilkenny	0-10	10	Waterford
11	Danny Sutcliffe	Dublin	2-3	9	Kilkenny
11	T. J. Reid	Kilkenny	1-6	9	Galway
11	Pa Bourke	Tipperary	1-6	9	Galway
11	Pa Bourke	Tipperary	1-6	9	Cork
11	Paul Ryan	Dublin	0-9	9	Galway
11	Patrick Horgan	Cork	0-9	9	Tipperary
11	Patrick Horgan	Cork	0-9	9	Tipperary
11	Richie Power	Kilkenny	0-9	9	Clare
19	Paul Ryan	Dublin	0-8	8	Cork
19	Patrick Horgan	Cork	0-8	8	Kilkenny

== Division 1B ==
=== Division 1B ===
Division champions and promoted team Relegated team

Team	Pld	W	D	L	F	A	Diff	Pts
Clare	5	5	0	0	10-98	3-75	44	10
Limerick	5	3	1	1	9-95	8-81	17	7
Offaly	5	2	1	2	8-98	8-83	15	5
Antrim	5	2	0	3	5-65	7-73	-14	4
Wexford	5	2	0	3	9-87	10-91	-7	4
Laois	5	0	0	5	6-74	11-109	-50	0

- Antrim are placed ahead of Wexford as they won the head-to-head match between the teams.

==== Fixtures and results ====
25 February 2012 Round 1	Limerick	1-13 - 2-24	Clare	Gaelic Grounds, Limerick
19:00	S Dowling 0-7 (4f), J N Moran 1-1, C Allis 0-2 (1 sl), D O’Grady, J Ryan & K Downes 0-1 each.	Report	C McGrath 1-10 (0-8f), C Ryan 1-1, J Conlon 0-4, N O’Connell 0-3, C McInerney & S Collins 0-2 each, P Donnellan & F Lynch 0-1.	Attendance: 5,390; Referee: J Ryan (Tipperary)

26 February 2012 Round 1	Offaly	1-27 - 0-18	Laois	O'Connor Park, Tullamore
14:30	S Dooley (0-7, 0-3 frees), B Murphy (0-5), J Bergin (0-4), J Mulrooney (1-1), S Ryan (0-3), T Carroll (0-2), R Hanniffy, D Morkan, D Molloy, C Mahon, C Egan (0-1 each).	Report	W Hyland (0-8, 0-4 frees), B Dunne (0-4), J Fitzpatrick, T Fitzgerald, J Brophy (0-2 each).	Referee: J Owens (Wexford)

26 February 2012 Round 1	Antrim	3-18 - 2-15	Wexford	Casement Park, Belfast
14:30	S McNaughton 1-7 (6f), K Stewart 1-3, PJ O'Connell 0-3, K Sheeran 1-0, N McManus (2f), M Herron 0-2 each, N McAuley 0-1.	Report	E Quigley 2-0, T O'Leary, G Sinnott, G Moore (2f), P Morris (1f), R Jacob, J Berry (2f) 0-2 each, R Kehoe, PJ Nolan, S Murphy 0-1 each	Referee: E Hasson (Derry)

11 March 2012 Round 2	Clare	0-20 - 0-12	Antrim	Cusack Park, Ennis
14:30	N O’Connell (0-6) 4 f’s, C McGrath (0-6) 4 f’s, C Ryan (0-3), C Morey (0-2), J Conlon, D Keane, C McInerney (0-1) each.	Report	S McNaughton (0-5) f’s, N McManus (0-4) 1 f, K Stewart, PJ O’Connell, C McFall 90-1) each.	Referee: B Gavin (Offaly)

11 March 2012 Round 2	Wexford	3-18 - 2-20	Offaly	Wexford Park, Wexford
14:30	H Kehoe (0-7, five frees), G Moore (1-1), D O’Keeffe (1-1), J Guiney (1-0, a free) E Quigley (0-2), D Redmond (0-2), PJ Nolan (0-2), T O’Leary (0-1), R Kehoe (0-1), R Jacob (0-1).	Report	S Dooley (0-9, eight frees), B Murphy (1-2), C Egan (1-1), D Molloy (0-2), J Bergin (0-2), D Morkham (0-1, free), S Ryan (0-1), D Mooney (0-1), T Carroll (0-1).	Referee: A Stapleton (Laois)

11 March 2012 Round 2	Laois	2-12 - 1-24	Limerick	O'Moore Park, Portlaoise
14:30	W Hyland 0-8 (6frees), B Dunne 1-2, M McEvoy 1-0, J Fitzpatrick, T Fitzgerald 0-1 each.	Report	D Breen 1-4, G Mulcahy, S Dowling (4frees) 0-6 each, C Allis 0-5 (3frees, ’65), N Moran 0-2, P Browne 0-1.	Referee: T Carroll (Offaly)

18 March 2012 Round 3	Laois	2-13 - 2-22	Clare	O'Moore Park, Portlaoise
12:45	W Hyland 1-6 (1 pen, 3f), N Foyle 1-1, M Whelan, J Walsh, M McEvoy, J Brophy, S Maher, C Murray 0-1 each	Report	J Conlon 1-3, C Ryan 0-5 (3f), P Donnellan 0-4, S Collins 1-1, D Keane 0-3, J McInerney, J Clancy 0-2 each, N O'Connell (1f), C Morey 0-1 each	Referee: E Hasson (Derry)

18 March 2012 Round 3	Offaly	1-22 - 1-17	Antrim	O'Connor Park, Tullamore
14:30	S Dooley 1-10 (0-10f), J Bergin 0-04, B Murphy 0-03, C Mahon, J Mulrooney 0-02 each, R Hanniffy 0-01		S McNaughton 0-10 (0-08f, 0-01 '65'), D Lynch 1-00, P Shiels, PJ O'Connell, N McManus (0-01 '65') 0-02 each, M Herron 0-01	Attendance: Sparse; Referee: Johnny Ryan (Tipperary).

18 March 2012 Round 3	Wexford	0-18 - 2-20	Limerick	Wexford Park, Wexford
14:30	H Kehoe 0-7, (5f, 1 '65'), J Guiney 0-3 (2f, 1, 65), D Redmond, D O'Keeffe, S Banville 0-2 each, PJ Nolan, R Jacob, 0-1 each	Report	N Moran 1-5, D O'Grady 1-2, C Allis 0-6 (5f), G Mulcahy 0-3, G O'Mahoney (f), P Browne, M Ryan, N Maher 0-1 each	Referee: C Lyons (Cork)

24 March 2012 Round 4	Limerick	2-16 - 4-10	Offaly	Gaelic Grounds, Limerick
19:00	S Tobin 1-2, C Allis 0-4 (2f, 1 '65'), N Moran 1-0, T Quaid 0-3, D Breen, G Mulcahy 0-2 each, P Browne, N Maher, S O'Brien 0-1 each.	Report	S Dooley 2-5 (1-0 pen, 0-3f, 0-1 '65', 0-1 sl), C Mahon, G Healion 1-0 each, B Murphy, J Rigney 0-2 each, D Horan 0-1.	Referee: C McAllister (Cork)

25 March 2012 Round 4	Clare	3-16 - 0-18	Wexford	Cusack Park, Ennis
14:30	C McGrath (1-7, four frees), J Conlon (1-2), S Collins (1-1), N O’Connell (0-3, one free), L Markham (0-2), F Lynch (0-1).	Report	J Guiney (0-12, 10 frees, one 65), H Kehoe (0-2, free), D O’Keeffe (0-1), R Kehoe (0-1), J Berry (0-1), D Lyng (0-1).	Referee: A Kelly (Galway)

25 March 2012 Round 4	Antrim	2-18 - 2-16	Laois	Casement Park, Belfast
14:30	S McNaughton (1-8, 4f), N McManus (0-4), C Carson (1-0), P Shiels (0-2), C Donnelly (0-1f), S McCrory (0-1), PJ O’Connell (0-1), B McFall (0-1).	Report	W Hyland (0-9, 0-6f), C Murray (1-2), B Reddin (1-0), D O’Mahoney (0-2), W Dunphy (0-1), S Bourke (0-1), A Collier (0-1).	Referee: J McGrath (Westmeath)

1 April 2012 Round 5	Wexford	4-18 - 0-15	Laois	Wexford Park, Wexford
14:30	J Guiney 1-8 (1-5fs, 1 65), P Morris 2-2, R Jacob 1-2, H Kehoe 0-2, S Murphy, D Lyng, PJ Nolan, J Fogarty 0-1 each.	Report	W Hyland 0-9, (3fs, 1 65), S Lowney 0-3, M Whelan 0-2 (1f), J Walsh 0-1.	Referee: T Carroll (Laois)

1 April 2012 Round 5	Offaly	0-19 - 2-14	Clare	O'Connor Park, Tullamore
14:30	S Dooley 0-12 (0-8 frees, 0-1 ’65 & 0-1 penalty), J Bergin 0-3, S Ryan 0-1, C Egan 0-1, D Morkan 0-1, C Parlon 0-1.	Report	C Ryan 0-7 (0-6 frees), B Donnellan 1-0, C Chaplin 1-0, C McInerney 0-2, A Cunningham 0-2, C Morey 0-1, L Markham 0-1, P Kelly 0-1.	Referee: J Sexton (Cork)

1 April 2012 Round 5	Antrim	0-17 - 3-22	Limerick	Casement Park, Belfast
14:30	S McNaughton (0-9, 4f), M Herron (0-2), E McCloskey (0-2), K Stewart (0-1), PJ O’Connell (0-1), N McManus (0-1), B McFall (0-1).	Report	S Dowling (2-4, 2-0 frees, 0-1 pen), C Allis (0-9, 2f, 0-2 ‘65s’), S Tobin (1-2), J Ryan (0-2), D Breen (0-2), N Moran (0-1), S Walsh (0-1), T Quaid (0-1).	Referee: A Nitwit Kelly (Galway)

7 April 2012 Final	Clare	0-21 - 1-16	Limerick	Gaelic Grounds, Limerick
18:00	C McGrath (0-12, 0-10f), N O'Connell (0-3, 2'65's, 1f), C Ryan (0-3), P Donnellan (0-1), J Conlon (0-1), A Cunningham (0-1).	Report	S Dowling (1-7, 1pen, 4f, '65), G Mulcahy (0-3), S O'Brien (0-2), J Ryan (0-1), N Moran (0-1), T Quaid (0-1), K Downes (0-1).	Attendance: 9,897; Referee: B Gavin (Offaly)

15 April 2012 Relegation play-off	Wexford	5-12 - 0-19	Laois	Nowlan Park, Kilkenny
14:00	J Guiney 3-5 (4fs), D Redmond, P Morris 1-1 each, H Kehoe, R Jacob 0-2 each, PJ Nolan 0-1.	Report	W Hyland 0-11 (8fs, 2 sideline), C Murray 0-3, S Bourke 0-2, J Walsh, T Fitzgerald, B Reddin 0-1.	Referee: D Kirwan (Cork)

==== Top scorers ====
===== Season =====
Rank	Player	County	Tally	Total	Matches	Average
1	Willie Hyland	Laois	1-61	64	6	10.66
2	Shane Dooley	Offaly	3-43	52	5	10.40
3	Shane McNaughton	Antrim	2-39	45	5	9.00
4	Conor McGrath	Clare	2-35	41	4	10.25

===== Single game =====
Rank	Player	County	Tally	Total	Opposition
1	Jack Guiney	Wexford	3-5	14	Laois
2	Conor McGrath	Clare	1-10	13	Limerick
2	Shane Dooley	Offaly	1-10	13	Antrim
4	Jack Guiney	Wexford	0-12	12	Clare
4	Conor McGrath	Clare	0-12	12	Limerick
4	Shane Dooley	Offaly	0-12	12	Clare
7	Shane Dooley	Offaly	2-5	11	Limerick
7	Jack Guiney	Wexford	1-8	11	Laois
7	Shane McNaughton	Antrim	1-8	11	Laois
7	Willie Hyland	Laois	0-11	11	Wexford
11	Shane Dowling	Limerick	2-4	10	Antrim
11	Shane Dowling	Limerick	1-7	10	Clare
11	Shane McNaughton	Antrim	1-7	10	Wexford
11	Conor McGrath	Clare	1-7	10	Wexford
11	Shane McNaughton	Antrim	0-10	10	Offaly
16	Willie Hyland	Laois	1-6	9	Clare
16	Shane Dooley	Offaly	0-9	9	Wexford
16	Willie Hyland	Laois	0-9	9	Antrim
16	Willie Hyland	Laois	0-9	9	Wexford
16	Shane McNaughton	Antrim	0-9	9	Limerick

== Division 2A ==
=== Division 2A ===
Division champions and promoted team Relegated team

Team	Pld	W	D	L	F	A	Diff	Pts
Carlow	5	4	1	0	8-86	4-58	40	9
Westmeath	5	4	0	1	10–94	9-68	29	8
Derry	5	2	1	2	4-71	7-75	-13	5
Kerry	5	2	0	3	11-77	2-87	17	4
Wicklow	5	0	3	2	2–64	9-74	-31	3
Down	5	0	1	4	7-72	11-102	-42	1

==== Fixtures and results ====
26 February 2012 Round 1	Carlow	3-17 - 1-6	Down	Dr Cullen Park, Carlow
14:00	M Kavanagh 1-6 (4f), C Doyle 1-3, S Kavanagh 1-1 (1f), A Gaule, J Kane, D Roberts 0-2 each, P Kehoe 0-1f	Report	P Braniff 0-4f, D Toner 1-1, D Hughes 0-1	Referee: S Cleere (Kilkenny)

26 February 2012 Round 1	Westmeath	0-19 - 3-8	Kerry	Cusack Park, Mullingar
14:30	B Murtagh (0-13, 9F, 1 '65), A Mitchell (0-2), J Gilligan (0-1, P Dowdall (0-1), A Mcgrath (0-1), Frank Boyle (0-1).	Report	P Boyle (3-0), S Brick (0-4, 3f), W O'Dwyer (0-2), S Nolan (0-1), A Boyle (0-1).

26 February 2012 Round 1	Wicklow	0-14 - 1-11	Derry	Aughrim County Ground, Aughrim
14:30	J O'Neill 0-11 (8f), A O'Brien, E Glynn, R Keddy 0-1 each	Report	S Farren 1-4 (3f), R Convery 0-4 (1f), O McCloskey, P McCloskey, J Mulholland 0-1 each	Referee: D Hughes (Carlow)

11 March 2012 Round 2	Kerry	0-13 - 0-20	Carlow	Fitzgerald Stadium, Killarney
12:45	S Nolan 1-3, S Brick 0-5 (3f), W O'Dwyer 0-2, P Boyle, J Griffin, D O'Connell (1f) 0-1 each	Report	P Kehoe 0-11 (10f), C Doyle 0-3, R Coady 0-2, M Brennan, J Kane, M Kavanagh, E Byrne 0-1 each	Referee: J O'Connell (Cork)

11 March 2012 Round 2	Down	2-11 - 0-17	Wicklow	Páirc Esler, Newry
14:30	P Braniff 1-6 (1f), D Toner 1-0, K McGarry, P Sheehan 0-2 each, P Keith 0-1	Report	J O'Neill 0-9 (7f), J Connors 0-4, A O'Brien 0-2, E Glynn, G Bermingham 0-1 each	Referee: L McAuley (Antrim)

11 March 2012 Round 2	Derry	2-13 - 3-19	Westmeath	Celtic Park, Derry
14:30	P Henry 0-10 (9f), R Convery 1-2, A Grant 1-0, P McCloskey 0-1	Report	B Murtagh 0-9 (8f, 1 '65'), P Greville 1-3, D Carthy 1-1, F Boyle 0-4, J Gilligan 1-0, J Clarke, A Dermody 0-1 each	Referee: D Magee (Down)

18 March 2012 Round 3	Down	1-14 - 1-20	Derry	Páirc Esler, Newry
12:45	P Braniff 1-8 (1-8f), D Toner 0-3, E Clarke 0-2 (1 '65'), F Conway 0-1	Report	P Henry 1-10 (10f), R Convery, O McCloskey 0-3 each, S Farren 0-2, L Hinphey, B Quigley 0-1 each	Referee: O Elliott (Antrim)

18 March 2012 Round 3	Wicklow	1-12 - 2-22	Kerry	Aughrim County Ground, Aughrim
12:45	P Farrell 1-0, A O'Brien 0-4f, J O'Neill 0-3 (2f), T Doyle, E Glynn 0-2 each, C Moorehouse 0-1	Report	S Brick 0-10 (4f, 2 '65), S Nolan 2-3, J Flaherty 0-3, D Dineen 0-2, A O'Connor, C Harty, D O'Connell, PJ Connolly 0-1 each	Referee: P Murphy (Carlow)

18 March 2012 Round 3	Carlow	2-17 - 1-16	Westmeath	Dr Cullen Park, Carlow
12:45	R Smithers 2-2, S Kavanagh (3f), M Kavanagh (3f), C Doyle 0-3 each, P Kehoe (2f), M Brennan 0-2 each, J Kavanagh, E Byrne 0-1 each	Report	B Murtagh 1-10 (1-9f, 1 '65'), J Shaw 0-2, P Greville, A Clarke, D Carty, E Price 0-1 each

24 March 2012 Round 4	Westmeath	3-19 - 0-10	Wicklow	Cusack Park, Mullingar
14:30	B Murtagh 2-9 (1-6fs), P Greville 1-1, J Shaw 0-3, F Boyle 0-2, P Dowdall, C Boyle, A Clarke and A Dermody 0-1 each.	Report	A O’Brien 0-6 (5fs, 1‘65’), E Kearns, R Keddy, E Glynn and T Doyle 0-1 each.	Referee: J O'Mahony (Limerick)

25 March 2012 Round 4	Kerry	4-27 - 1-21	Down	Fitzgerald Stadium, Killarney
12:45	S Nolan 1-6, S Brick 1-5 (3f), A Boyle 2-0, W O’Dwyer, D O’Connell 0-4 each, D Walsh 0-3, D Dineen (1 sl) 0-2, C Harty, PJ Connolly, J Flaherty 0-1 each.	Report	P Braniff (1-6f) 1-9, F Conway, E Clarke (1 65, 1 sl) 0-3 each, P Keith, C Baillie 0-2 each, D Toner, P Sheehan 0-1 each.

25 March 2012 Round 4	Carlow	2-21 - 0-12	Derry	Dr Cullen Park, Carlow
12:45	S Kavanagh 1-3 (2fs, 1 65), E Byrne 0-4, M Brennan 1-1, P Kehoe 0-3fs, J Kavanagh, J Kane, C Doyle, A Gaul 0-2 each, R Smithers, H P O’Byrne 0-1 each.	Report	P Henry 0-9, (8fs, 1 65), P Kelly, O McCloskey, K Hinphey 0-1 each.

1 April 2012 Round 5	Wicklow	1-11 - 1-11	Carlow	Aughrim County Ground, Aughrim
14:30	A O’Brien 0-10 (6fs), W O’Gorman 1-0, E Dunne 0-1.	Report	P Coady 0-4 (3fs), S Kavanagh 0-3 (2fs, 1 65), M Brennan 1-0, D Roberts 0-2, P Kehoe, K McCabe 0-1 each.	Referee: P Casey (Waterford)

1 April 2012 Round 5	Down	2-20 - 3-21	Westmeath	Páirc Esler, Newry
14:30	P Braniff 0-13 (11fs, 1 65), C Mageean 1-1, D Toner 1-0, C Bailie 0-2, M Ennis, E Clarke, D Hughes, F Conway 0-1 each.	Report	E Price, D Carty 1-4 each, N O’Brien 1-0, B Murtagh 0-5 (1f), J Shaw, A Dermody 0-2 each, J Clarke, A Clarke, D McCormack, R Grenville 0-1 each.	Referee: G Duffy (Antrim)

1 April 2012 Round 5	Derry	0-15 - 1-7	Kerry	Celtic Park, Derry
14:30	K Hinphey 0-5, R Convery 0-3, P Henry 0-2, P Kelly 0-2, C Gilmore, L Craig, A Grant 0-1 each.	[www.irishexaminer.com/sport/gaa/hurling/derry-dominate-kingdom-189136.html Report]	D O’Connell 0-5, J Lahert 1-0, PJ Connolly 0-2.	Referee: O Elliot (Antrim)

15 April 2012 Final	Carlow	1-14 - 0-12	Westmeath	Nowlan Park, Kilkenny
16:00	M. Clowry (1-0), P. Kehoe (0-3, 0-2 from frees), S. Kavanagh (0-3 from frees), M. Kavanagh (0-2 from frees), C. Doyle (0-2), A. Gaule (0-2), D. Roberts (0-1), J. Kavanagh (0-1).	Report	B. Murtagh (0-5, 0-2 from frees), N. O’Brien (0-5, 0-3 from frees, 0-1 from a ’65), D. McCormack (0-2).	Referee: C Lyons (Cork)

22 April 2012 Relegation play-off	Wicklow	2-14 — 0-17	Down	St. Loman's Park, Trim
2:30 p.m.	J O'Neill (1-0 pen, 0-1f), E Kearns 1-1 each; W Gorman, E Glynn 0-3 each; A O'Brien, R Keddy 0-2 each; B Cuddihy, C Moorehouse 0-1 each	Report	P Braniff 0-14 (10f); M Cunningham (sideline), D Toner, A O'Prey 0-1 each	Referee: F Smith (Meath)

==== Top scorers ====
===== Season =====
Rank	Player	County	Tally	Total	Matches	Average
1	Brendan Murtagh	Westmeath	3-51	60	6	10.00
2	Paul Braniff	Down	3-37	46	5	9.20
3	Paddy Henry	Derry	1-31	34	4	8.50

===== Single game =====
Rank	Player	County	Tally	Total	Opposition
1	Brendan Murtagh	Westmeath	2-9	15	Wicklow
2	Brendan Murtagh	Westmeath	1-10	13	Carlow
2	Paddy Henry	Derry	1-10	13	Down
2	Paul Braniff	Down	0-13	13	Westmeath
2	Brendan Murtagh	Westmeath	0-13	13	Kerry
6	Paul Braniff	Down	1-8	11	Derry
6	Paudie Kehoe	Carlow	0-11	11	Kerry
6	Jonathan O'Neill	Wicklow	0-11	11	Derry
9	Paddy Henry	Derry	0-10	10	Westmeath
9	Andy O'Brien	Wicklow	0-10	10	Carlow
9	Shane Brick	Kerry	0-10	10	Wicklow
12	Pádraig Boyle	Kerry	3-0	9	Westmeath
12	Shane Nolan	Kerry	1-6	9	Down
12	Paul Braniff	Down	1-6	9	Kerry
12	Paul Braniff	Down	1-6	9	Wicklow
12	Brendan Murtagh	Westmeath	0-9	9	Derry
12	Jonathan O'Neill	Wicklow	0-9	9	Down
12	Paddy Henry	Derry	0-9	9	Carlow

== Division 2B ==
=== Division 2B ===
Division champions and promoted team

Team	Pld	W	D	L	F	A	Diff	Pts
Kildare	5	4	0	1	13-104	2-68	69	8
Meath	5	3	1	1	7-74	5-50	30	7
Mayo	5	2	1	2	6-69	5-84	-12	5
London	5	2	0	3	7-75	6-74	4	4
Armagh	5	2	0	3	1-66	12-95	-62	4
Roscommon	5	1	0	4	7-68	11-85	-29	2

- London are placed ahead of Armagh because they won the head-to-head game between the teams.

==== Fixtures and results ====
26 February 2012 Round 1	Meath	0-13 - 1-12	Kildare	Páirc Tailteann, Navan
14:30	N Horan 0-5 (5f), S Clynch 0-3 (2f), N Kirby (0-2), S Donoghue (0-1), E Marsh (0-1), P Durnin (0-1).	Report	P Divilly 1-2 (0-2f), L Quinn (0-3), R Hoban (0-2 one free, one '65'), C Kenny (0-2), M Maloney (0-1), D Harney (0-1), J Enright (0-1).

26 February 2012 Round 1	Roscommon	1-8 - 0-16	Mayo	Athleague
14:30	G Fallon (1-0), D Nolan (0-3), G Fallon (0-2), S Curley (0-1), T Seale (0-1), J Coyne (0-1).	Report	K Higgins (0-10), C Freeman (0-4), C McCrudden (0-1), K Feeney (0-1).	Referee: C Browne (Galway)

26 February 2012 Round 1	London	2-21 - 0-12	Armagh	Ruislip
14:30	E Brennan 2-1, P Sloane 0-5 (2f, 1 ’65), E Gleeson 0-3, E Cooney, S Ryan, T Dunne 0-2 each, G Fennelly, N Forde, M O’Meara, H Vaughan, N Rogers 0-1 each.	Report	D Carvill 0-5 (4f), C Carvill 0-2, D Coulter (f), F Bradley, A Carville, M Lennon 0-1 each.	Referee: F Smith (Meath)

11 March 2012 Round 2	Kildare	0-24 - 0-15	London	Newbridge
12:45

11 March 2012 Round 2	Mayo	3-12 - 1-18	Meath	McHale Park, Castlebar
12:45

11 March 2012 Round 2	Armagh	1-20 - 1-14	Roscommon	Athletic Grounds, Armagh
14:30

18 March 2012 Round 3	Armagh	0-21 - 1-11	Mayo	Athletic Grounds, Armagh
14:30

18 March 2012 Round 3	Roscommon	1-13 - 5-19	Kildare	Athleague
14:30

18 March 2012 Round 3	London	0-7 - 2-8	Meath	Ruislip
14:30

24 March 2012 Round 4	London	3-18 - 1-10	Mayo	Ruislip
14:30

25 March 2012 Round 4	Kildare	7-30 - 0-7	Armagh	Newbridge
12:45

25 March 2012 Round 4	Meath	3-16 - 1-11	Roscommon	Páirc Tailteann, Navan
14:30

1 April 2012 Round 5	Roscommon	3-22 - 2-14	London	Athleague
14:30

1 April 2012 Round 5	Armagh	0-8 - 1-19	Meath	Athletic Grounds, Armagh
14:30

1 April 2012 Round 5	Mayo	1-20 - 0-19	Kildare	McHale Park, Castlebar
14:30	K Feeney (0-11,9f, 1 65’), S Hoban (1-3), B Hunt (0-3), C Freeman (0-2), K Higgins (0-1).		P Divilly (0-8,7f), M Fitzgerald (0-4, 1f), T Murphy (0-2), R Kelly (0-1), D Butler (0-1), M Moloney (0-1), D Smith (0-1), L Quinn (0-1).	Referee: C Brown (Galway)

15 April 2012 Final	Kildare	3-13 - 1-12	Meath	Parnell Park

== Division 3A ==
=== Division 3A ===
Division champions (not promoted) Relegated team

Team	Pld	W	D	L	F	A	Diff	Pts
Monaghan	5	4	1	0	6-78	5-50	31	9
Fingal	5	4	0	1	9-73	4-69	19	8
Louth	5	2	2	1	6–87	4-63	30	6
Tyrone	5	2	0	3	4-82	7-75	-2	4
Donegal	5	1	0	4	7-61	9-99	-44	2
Sligo	5	0	1	4	8-58	11-83	-34	1

==== Fixtures and results ====
26 February 2012 Round 1	Tyrone	3-18 - 2-09	Sligo	Healy Park, Omagh
14:30

26 February 2012 Round 1	Monaghan	1-18 - 1-11	Donegal	Clones
14:30

26 February 2012 Round 1	Louth	0-12 - 1-13	Fingal	Dowdallshill
14:30

11 March 2012 Round 2	Sligo	2-13 - 1-16	Louth	Markievicz Park, Sligo
12:45

11 March 2012 Round 2	Fingal	0-11 - 0-16	Monaghan	Swords
14:30

11 March 2012 Round 2	Donegal	1-10 - 0-24	Tyrone	Letterkenny
14:30

18 March 2012 Round 3	Monaghan	1-09 - 1-09	Louth	Inniskeen
14:30

18 March 2012 Round 3	Fingal	4-15 - 0-14	Tyrone	Swords
14:30

18 March 2012 Round 3	Donegal	1-16 - 2-12	Sligo	Letterkenny
14:30

25 March 2012 Round 4	Sligo	0-15 - 2-15	Fingal	Markievicz Park, Sligo
14:30

25 March 2012 Round 4	Tyrone	1-10 - 0-17	Monaghan	Healy Park, Omagh
12:45

25 March 2012 Round 4	Louth	4-24 - 0-12	Donegal	Dowdallshill
14:30

1 April 2012 Round 5	Fingal	2-19 - 4-12	Donegal	Swords
14:30

1 April 2012 Round 5	Monaghan	0-24 - 0-16	Sligo	Inniskeen
14:30

1 April 2012 Round 5	Louth	4-18 - 2-9	Tyrone	Dowdallshill
14:30

15 April 2012 Relegation playoff	Donegal	2-13 - 0-16	Sligo	Brewster Park, Enniskillen
16:30

15 April 2012 Final	Fingal	w/o — scr.	Monaghan	O'Connor Park, Tullamore

The Monaghan team gave a walkover after a dispute with the county board, who had refused to reschedule Gaelic football club games to allow their players to rest for the final.

== Division 3B ==
=== Division 3B ===
Division champions and promoted team

Team	Pld	W	D	L	F	A	Diff	Pts
Fermanagh	3	3	0	0	6-41	3-16	34	6
Warwickshire	3	2	0	1	11-49	2-29	47	4
Leitrim	3	1	0	2	6-35	9-57	-31	2
Longford	3	0	0	3	1-15	10-38	-50	0

==== Fixtures and results ====
18 March 2012 Round 1	Longford	1-8 - 2-21	Leitrim	Michael Fay Park, Longford
14:30

18 March 2012 Round 1	Fermanagh	0-14 - 1-10	Warwickshire	Brewster Park, Enniskillen
14:30

25 March 2012 Round 2	Warwickshire	8-19 - 0-5	Longford	Páirc na hÉireann, Solihull
14:30

25 March 2012 Round 2	Leitrim	2-6 - 6-27	Fermanagh	Seán O'Heslin park, Ballinamore
14:30

1 April 2012 Round 3	Leitrim	2-10 - 2-20	Warwickshire	Seán O'Heslin park, Ballinamore
14:30

1 April 2012 Round 3	Fermanagh	w/o - scr.	Longford	Irvinestown
14:30		Report

14 April 2012 Final	Warwickshire	2-5 - 2-15	Fermanagh	Parnell Park, Dublin
14:00

== Broadcasting rights ==
Setanta Sports and TG4 provided live coverage of matches in Ireland with RTÉ providing highlights on Sunday nights. The finals were all shown live on TG4. Setanta Sports broadcast live matches in Australia. Setanta Sports also provided coverage of matches from the National Hurling League to viewers in Asia.

Preceded by 2011 National Hurling League	National Hurling League	Succeeded by 2013 National Hurling League
