= List of Carlow senior hurling team captains =

This article lists players who have captained the Carlow county hurling team in the Christy Ring Cup, the Leinster Senior Hurling Championship and the All-Ireland Senior Hurling Championship.

== List of captains ==
Year	Player(s)	Club	National titles
2008	Edward Coady	Mount Leinster Rangers	Christy Ring Cup-winning captain
2009	Mark Brennan	Naomh Bríd	Christy Ring Cup-winning captain
2010	Edward Coady	Mount Leinster Rangers	
2011	Paudie Kehoe	St Mullin's	
2012	Edward Coady; Shane Kavanagh	Mount Leinster Rangers; Naomh Eoin	
2013			
2014	Edward Coady	Mount Leinster Rangers	
2015	Séamus Murphy; Alan Corcoran	St Mullin's; Erin's Own	
2016	Séamus Murphy; Alan Corcoran	St Mullin's; Erin's Own	
2017	Martin Kavanagh	St Mullin's	Christy Ring Cup-winning captain
2018	Diarmuid Byrne; Richard Coady	Mount Leinster Rangers; Mount Leinster Rangers	Joe McDonagh Cup-winning captains
2019	Diarmuid Byrne; Richard Coady	Mount Leinster Rangers; Mount Leinster Rangers	
2020	Diarmuid Byrne; Edward Coady	Mount Leinster Rangers; Mount Leinster Rangers	
2021			
2022	Michael Doyle	Mount Leinster Rangers	
2023	Paul Doyle	St Mullin's	Joe McDonagh Cup-winning captain
2024	Kevin McDonald	Mount Leinster Rangers	
2025			
2026			
