= John O'Dwyer =

Irish hurler

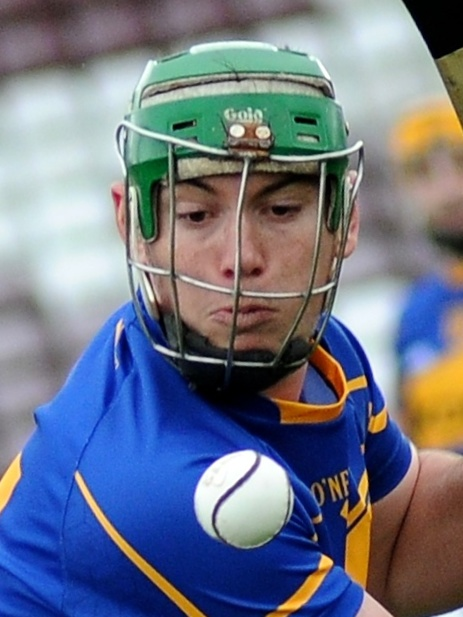

Personal information
- Native name: Seán Ó Duibhir (Irish)
- Nickname: Bubbles
- Born: 17 September 1991 (age 35) Clonmel, County Tipperary, Ireland
- Occupation: carpenter
- Height: 5 ft 10 in (178 cm)

Sport
- Sport: Hurling
- Position: Centre-forward
Club
- Years: Club
- 2008–: Killenaule
Club titles
- Tipperary titles: 0
College
- Years: College
- Cork Institute of Technology
College titles
- Fitzgibbon titles: 0
Inter-county*
Years	County	Apps (scores)
2013–2023	Tipperary	37 (8-110)
Inter-county titles
- Munster titles: 2
- All-Irelands: 2
- NHL: 0
- All Stars: 1
- *Inter County team apps and scores correct as of 15:54, 31 July 2021.

John "Bubbles" O'Dwyer (born 17 September 1991) is an Irish hurler who plays for Tipperary Senior club Championship club Killenaule and previously played at inter-county level with the Tipperary senior hurling team. He usually lines out as a centre-forward.

== Playing career ==
=== Cork Institute of Technology ===
O'Dwyer studied at the Cork Institute of Technology and joined the senior hurling team in his second year at the institute. On 1 March 2014, he top scored for the team with five points when CIT suffered a 0–17 to 0–12 defeat by the Waterford Institute of Technology in the Fitzgibbon Cup final.

=== Killenaule ===
O'Dwyer joined the Killenaule club at a young age and played in all grades at juvenile and underage levels. He was just 16 years old when he joined the club's senior teams as a dual player in 2008.

On 30 August 2008, O'Dwyer lined out at right corner-forward when Killenaule faced Ballingarry in the South Tipperary Championship final. He scored 4-06 and ended the game with a winners' medal following the 5–15 to 1–10 victory.

On 2 September 2013, O'Dwyer was selected at centre-forward when Killenaule lined out against Carrick Swans in the South Tipperary Championship final. He top scored with 0-14 and claimed a second winners' medal after a 1–22 to 2–16 victory.

Killenaule qualified for a second successive South Tipperary Championship final on 23 August 2014 with Mullinahone providing the opposition. O'Dwyer scored nine points from centre-forward and collected a third winners' medal following the 0–21 to 2–13 victory.

=== Tipperary ===
==== Minor and under-21 ====
O'Dwyer first played for Tipperary as a 16-year-old when he joined the minor team during the 2008 Munster Championship. He made his first appearance for the team on 30 April 2008 and scored two points in the 3–21 to 1–12 defeat of Limerick. On 13 July 2008, O'Dwyer came on as a substitute for Paddy Murphy when Tipperary suffered a 0–19 to 0–18 defeat by Cork in the Munster final.

O'Dwyer was again eligible for the minor grade for a second and final season in 2009. On 12 July 2009, he top scored for the team with 1–06 in an 0–18 to 1–13 defeat by Waterford in the Munster final.

O'Dwyer was drafted onto the Tipperary under-21 in advance of the 2010 Munster Championship. He made his debut for the team on 14 July 2010 and scored a point from full-forward in a 2–17 to 0-21 extra-time defeat of Cork. On 28 July 2010, O'Dwyer won a Munster Championship medal after scoring three points in Tipperary's 1–22 to 1–17 defeat of Clare in the final. He was switched to left corner-forward for the All-Ireland final against Galway on 11 September 2010. O'Dwyer ended the game with an All-Ireland medal after scoring 4–03 in the 5–22 to 0–12 victory.

O'Dwyer was appointed captain of the under-21 team for the 2012 Munster Championship. On 8 August 2012, he scored 1-07 when Tipperary suffered a 1–16 to 1–14 defeat by Clare in the Munster final.

==== Senior ====
O'Dwyer was added to the Tipperary senior team in advance of the 2013 National League. He made his first appearance for the team on 23 February 2013 and scored three points from centre-forward in a 0–26 to 1–11 defeat by Cork. On 5 May 2013, O'Dwyer came on as a substitute for Eoin Kelly at full-forward when Tipperary suffered a 2–17 to 0–20 defeat by Kilkenny in the National League final.

On 4 May 2014, O'Dwyer scored 1-03 from left wing-forward when Tipperary suffered a 2–25 to 1–27 defeat by Kilkenny in a second successive National League final. On 7 September 2014, he was again selected at left wing-forward for the All-Ireland final against Kilkenny. O'Dwyer scored seven points, however, his last-minute 97-metre free was ruled wide by Hawk-Eye and the game ended in a 1–28 to 3–22 draw. He was again selected at left wing-forward for the replay on 27 September 2014, however, he ended the game on the losing side following a 2-17 t 2–14 defeat. O'Dwyer ended the season by winning an All-Star award.

On 12 July 2015, O'Dwyer lined out at right corner-forward in his first Munster final. He scored 0-05 from play and ended the game with a Munster Championship medal following Tipperary's 0–21 to 0–16 defeat of Waterford.

On 19 June 2016, O'Dwyer received a straight red card after striking Limerick's Richie English in the 14th minute of Tipperary's 3–12 to 1-16 Munster semi-final victory. The red card meant that he missed the 5–19 to 0–13 defeat of Waterford in the final. O'Dwyer was back on the starting fifteen at right corner-forward for the All-Ireland final against Kilkenny on 4 September 2016. He scored 1-05 from play and ended the game with an All-Ireland medal following the 2–29 to 2–20 victory.

On 23 April 2017, O'Dwyer lined out at full-forward when Tipperary faced Galway in the National League final. He scored a point from play before being substituted in the 3–21 to 0–14 defeat.

O'Dwyer played in a second successive National League final on 8 April 2018. After starting the game on the bench, he was introduced as a substitute for Michael Breen at left corner-forward but ended the game on the losing side following a 2–23 to 2–17 defeat by Kilkenny.

On 30 June 2019, O'Dwyer scored a point from centre-forward when Tipperary suffered a 2–26 to 2–14 defeat by Limerick in the Munster final. On 18 August 2019, he was selected at right wing-forward when Tipperary faced Kilkenny in the All-Ireland final. O'Dwyer scored 1-02 from play and collected a second All-Ireland winners' medal following the 3–25 to 0–20 victory. He ended the season by receiving an All-Star nomination.

In February 2023, O'Dwyer announced his retirement from inter-county hurling.

=== Munster ===
O'Dwyer was added to the Munster team in advance of the 2016 Railway Cup. He made his first appearance for the team on 11 December 2016 and scored two points from right corner-forward in a 3–21 to 0–15 defeat of Ulster. On 15 December 2016, O'Dwyer won a Railway Cup medal following a 2–20 to 2–16 defeat of Leinster in the final.

== Career statistics ==
As of match played 31 July 2021.

Team	Year	National League			Munster		All-Ireland		Total	
Team	Year	Division	Apps	Score	Apps	Score	Apps	Score	Apps	Score
Tipperary	2013	Division 1A	6	2-09	1	1-03	1	0-03	8	3-15
Tipperary	2014	Division 1A	8	2-27	1	0-05	6	2-25	15	4-57
Tipperary	2015	Division 1A	6	2-17	2	0-12	1	0-02	9	2-31
Tipperary	2016	Division 1A	6	0-38	2	0-07	2	2-05	10	2-50
Tipperary	2017	Division 1A	8	0-14	1	0-02	4	1-14	13	1-30
Tipperary	2018	Division 1A	4	0-03	4	0-03	_		8	0-06
Tipperary	2019	Division 1A	5	0-05	5	0-14	3	1-05	13	1-24
Tipperary	2020	Division 1A	2	0-00	1	0-00	_		3	0-00
Tipperary	2021	Division 1A	2	0-04	2	1-06	1	0-04	5	1-14
Total			47	6-117	19	2-52	18	6-58	84	14-227

== Honours ==
Killenaule

- South Tipperary Senior Hurling Championship (3): 2008, 2013, 2015
- South Tipperary Senior Football Championship (2): 2012, 2014
- Tipperary Intermediate Football Championship (1): 2026

Tipperary

- All-Ireland Senior Hurling Championship (2): 2016, 2019
- Munster Senior Hurling Championship (2): 2015, 2016
- All-Ireland Under-21 Hurling Championship (1): 2010
- Munster Under-21 Hurling Championship (1): 2010

Munster

- Railway Cup (1): 2016

Individual

- GAA GPA All Stars Awards (1): 2014
- The Sunday Game Team of the Year (1): 2014

Sporting positions
Preceded by Noel McGrath	Tipperary Under-21 Hurling Captain; 2012	Succeeded by Niall O'Meara
