= 2010 All-Ireland Under-21 Hurling Championship =

All-Ireland Under-21 Hurling Championship 2010
Championship Details
- Dates: 2 June – 11 September 2010
- Teams: 17

All Ireland Champions
- Winners: Tipperary (9th win)
- Captain: Pádraic Maher
- Manager: Ken Hogan

All Ireland Runners-up
- Runners-up: Galway
- Captain: David Burke
- Manager: Anthony Cunningham

Provincial Champions
- Munster: Tipperary
- Leinster: Dublin
- Ulster: Antrim
- Connacht: Not Played

Championship Statistics
- Matches Played: 13
- Total Goals: 33 (2.53 per game)
- Total Points: 489 (37.61 per game)
- Top Scorer: Conor McGrath (1-17)

The 2010 Bord Gáis Energy GAA Hurling All-Ireland Under-21 Championship was the 47th staging of Ireland's hurling knock-out competition for players aged between 18 and 21. The final was held at Semple Stadium, Thurles on 11 September 2010. Tipperary won the game by 5-22 to 0-12 against Galway to claim their ninth title.

== The Championship ==
=== Overview ===
The All-Ireland Under-21 Hurling Championship of 2010 will be run on a provincial basis as usual. It will be a knockout tournament with pairings drawn at random in the respective provinces - there will be no seeds.

Each match will be played as a single leg. If a match is drawn a period of extra time will be played, however, if both sides were still level at the end of extra time a replay will take place.

=== Participating counties ===
Team	Colours	Sponsor	Most recent success	
Team	Colours	Sponsor	All-Ireland	Provincial
Antrim	Saffron and white	Creagh Concrete		2009
Armagh	Orange and white	Morgan Fuels		
Carlow	Red, green and yellow	Stone Developments		
Clare	Saffron and blue	Pat O'Donnell	2009	2009
Cork	Red and white	O2	1998	2007
Derry	White and red	Ladbrokes.com		2008
Down	Red and black	Canal Court Hotel		2005
Dublin	Blue and navy	Vodafone		2007
Fermanagh	Green and white	Tracey Concrete		
Galway	Maroon and white	Supermacs	2007	2005
Kilkenny	Black and amber	Glanbia	2008	2009
Laois	Blue and white	MW Hire Services		1983
Limerick	Green and white	Sporting Limerick	2002	2002
Offaly	Green, white and gold	Carroll Cuisine		2000
Tipperary	Blue and gold	Enfer	1995	2008
Waterford	White and blue	3	1992	1994
Wexford	Purple and gold	Sports Savers	1965	2002

=== Format ===
==== Leinster Championship ====
Quarter-finals: (2 matches) These are two lone matches between the first four teams drawn from the province of Leinster. Two teams are eliminated at this stage while the two winners advance to the semi-finals.

Semi-finals: (2 matches) The two winners of the two quarter-final games join the two remaining Leinster teams, who received a bye to this stage, to make up the semi-final pairings. Two teams are eliminated at this stage while the two winners advance to the final.

Final: (1 match) The winners of the two semi-finals contest this game. One team is eliminated at this stage while the winners advance to the All-Ireland semi-final.

==== Munster Championship ====
Quarter-final: (1 match) This is a single match between the first two teams drawn from the province of Munster. One team is eliminated at this stage while the winners advance to the semi-finals.

Semi-finals: (2 matches) The winners of the lone quarter-final game join the three remaining Munster teams, who received a bye to this stage, to make up the semi-final pairings. Two teams are eliminated at this stage while the two winners advance to the final.

Final: (1 match) The winners of the two semi-finals contest this game. One team is eliminated at this stage while the winners advance to the All-Ireland semi-final.

==== Ulster Championship ====
Quarter-final: (1 match) This is a single match between the first two teams drawn from the province of Ulster. One team is eliminated at this stage while the winners advance to the semi-finals.

Semi-finals: (2 matches) The winners of the lone quarter-final game join the three remaining Ulster teams, who received a bye to this stage, to make up the semi-final pairings. Two teams are eliminated at this stage while the two winners advance to the final.

Final: (1 match) The winners of the two semi-finals contest this game. One team is eliminated at this stage while the winners advance to the All-Ireland semi-final.

== Results ==
=== Leinster Under-21 Hurling Championship ===
Quarter-finals

9 June 2010 Quarter-final	Laois	0-9 - 1-14	Carlow	O'Moore Park, Portlaoise
	N Foyle (0-5), E Reilly (0-1), T Burke (0-1), A Collier (0-1), C Murray (0-1).		P Kehoe (0-10), A McDonald (1-1), D Kavanagh (0-1), D Byrne (0-1), E Byrne (0-1).	Referee: C Groome (Offaly)

9 June 2010 Quarter-final	Kilkenny	2-31 - 0-8	Offaly	Nowlan Park, Kilkenny
	M Bergin (1-9), J Nolan (1-2), L Ryan (0-5), C Fennelly (0-5), E Murphy (0-4), A Stapleton (0-3), W Walsh (0-2), P Murphy (0-1).		J Mulrooney (0-3), B Lonergan (0-2), D Currams (0-1), E Murphy (0-1), D Morkan (0-1).	Referee: D Hughes (Carlow)

Semi-finals

23 June 2010 Semi-final	Kilkenny	0-12 - 0-18	Dublin	Nowlan Park, Kilkenny
	M Bergin (0-7), P Murphy (0-2), E Murphy (0-2), A Stapleton (0-1).		S Stapleton (0-7), D Quinn (0-2), N McMurrow (0-2), B O'Rourke (0-1), D Plunkett (0-1), D Treacy (0-1), L Rushe (0-1), M Quilty (0-1), C Clinton (0-1), P Buckeridge (0-1).	Referee: F Smith (Meath)

23 June 2010 Semi-final	Wexford	2-17 - 2-13	Carlow	Wexford Park, Wexford
	E Moore (0-8), J Reck (1-1), J Gahan (1-0), P Morris (0-3), L Óg McGovern (0-2), M O'Regan (0-1), H Kehoe (0-1), S Murphy (0-1).		P Kehoe (1-6), A McDonald (1-0), D Kavanagh (0-3), D Murphy (0-2), A Corcoran (0-1), K McCabe (0-1).	Referee: D Connolly (Kilkenny)

Final

14 July 2010 Final	Dublin	2-15 - 0-15	Wexford	Parnell Park, Dublin
	D Plunkett (1-3), D Quinn (1-0), S Stapleton (0-3), D Treacy (0-3), N McMorrow (0-3), P Kelly (0-1), L Rushe (0-1), D Whelan (0-1).		S Tompkins (0-6), L Óg McGovern (0-4), E Kent (0-2), E Moore (0-1), H Kehoe (0-1), J Leacy (0-1).	Referee: D Connolly (Kilkenny)

=== Munster Under-21 Hurling Championship ===
Quarter-final

2 June 2010 Quarter-final	Cork	1-16 - 1-3	Waterford	Páirc Uí Chaoimh, Cork
	R Clifford (0-6), M O'Sullivan (1-0), C McCarthy (0-2), S O’Farrell (0-2), L O’Farrell (0-2), M Bowles (0-1), M Collins (0-1), J Nagle (0-1), P Gould (0-1).		B O'Sullivan (1-0), M Shanahan (0-2), S Kearney (0-1).	Referee: D O'Driscoll (Limerick)

Semi-finals

14 July 2010 Semi-final	Cork	0-21 - 2-17 (aet)	Tipperary	Páirc Uí Chaoimh, Cork
	N McGrath (0-6), S Hennessy (1-3), M Heffernan (1-2), S Carey (0-2), P Maher (0-1), P Murphy (0-1), J O'Dwyer (0-1), B Maher (0-1).		R Clifford (0-9), M Bowles (0-3), W Egan (0-2), L O'Farrell (0-2), D Kearney (0-2), R White (0-1), R O'Driscoll (0-1).	Referee: G Hoey (Clare)

14 July 2010 Semi-final	Limerick	1-12 - 1-15	Clare	Gaelic Grounds, Limerick
	T O'Brien (0-5), P Browne (0-2), S Tobin (0-2), D Hannon (0-1), M Kiely (0-1), K Owens (0-1), D Nash (Clare, own goal).		C McGrath (0-9), D Honan (1-3), P Vaughan (0-1), E Hayes (0-1), N O'Connell (0-1).	Referee: C McAllister (Cork)

Final

28 July 2010 Final	Tipperary	1-22 - 1-17	Clare	Semple Stadium, Thurles
	M Heffernan (1-3), S Hennessy (0-5), P Murphy (0-5), J O'Dwyer (0-3), S Carey (0-3), N McGrath (0-2), B O'Meara (0-1).		C McGrath (1-8), E Hayes (0-3), D Honan (0-3), J Conlon (0-1), S Collins (0-1), F Kennedy (0-1).	Attendance: 11,450; Referee: C McAllister (Cork)

=== Ulster Under-21 Hurling Championship ===
Quarter-final

14 July 2010 Quarter-final	Fermanagh	2-8 - 2-19	Armagh	Brewster Park, Enniskillen
	S Corrigan (1-4, 2f), J Duffy (1-3, 1-2f), D Teague (0-1).		M Lennon (0-9, 4f), S McNaughton (1-3), D Carvill (1-0); M Moan (0-2), P Monaghan (0-2), M Doran (0-1).	Referee: J O'Rourke

Semi-finals

21 July 2010 Semi-final	Armagh	2-12 - 0-10	Derry	Casement Park, Belfast
	C Coulter (1-4), K McKiernan (0-4), M Lennon (1-0), M Moan (0-1), C Corvan (0-1), D Carville (0-1), M Maguire (0-1).		P Henry (0-6), D O'Neill (0-2), A Grant (0-1), P Cleary (0-1).

21 July 2010 Semi-final	Antrim	0-19 - 1-12	Down
	D Hamill (0-9), M Armstrong (0-4), M Devlin (0-2), T McCann (0-1), C Rocks (0-1), J Campbell (0-1), PJ O'Connell (0-1).		P Keith (1-2), C Woods (0-4), D Toner (0-4), A Clarke (0-1), Mageean (0-1).

Final

28 July 2010 Final	Antrim	0-21 - 0-16	Armagh	Casement Park, Belfast
	D Hamill (0-10)), C Donnelly (0-4), M Armstrong (0-3), PJ O'Connell (0-2), T McCann (0-1).		K McKernan (0-7), C Coulter (0-3), M Maguire (0-2), M Lennon (0-2), N Curry (0-1), C Corvan (0-1).	Referee: D Magee (Down)

=== All-Ireland Under-21 Hurling Championship ===
Semi-finals

21 August 2010 Semi-final	Tipperary	2-32 - 1-7	Antrim	O'Connor Park, Tullamore
	J O’Dwyer (2-3), M Heffernan (0-6), N McGrath (0-6), S Carey (0-4), B O’Meara (0-3), K Morris (0-3), S Hennessy (0-1), Padraic Maher (0-1), Patrick Maher (0-1), B Maher (0-1), P Murphy (0-1), J O’Neill (0-1), A Ryan (0-1).		M Armstrong (1-2), T McCann (0-2), J Campbell (0-1), C Carson (0-1), D Hamill (0-1).	Referee: T Carroll (Offaly)

21 August 2010 Semi-final	Galway	2-14 - 1-10	Dublin	O'Connor Park, Tullamore
	N Quinn (1-2), D Burke (0-4), B Burke (1-0), E Forde (0-3), G Kelly (0-2), R Cummins (0-1), J Regan (0-1), J Coen (0-1).		D Quinn (1-0), D Whelan (0-3), N McMorrow (0-2), P Kelly (0-2), C Clinton (0-2), B O’Rorke (0-1).	Referee: J O'Mahony (Limerick)

Final

11 September 2010 Final	Galway	0-12 - 5-22	Tipperary	Semple Stadium, Thurles
	D Burke (0-2), J Coen (0-2), B Daly (0-1), J Regan (0-1), G Burke (0-1), G Kelly (0-1), B Burke (0-1), J Grealish (0-1), J Cooney (0-1), N Quinn (0-1).		S Carey (1-3), B O'Meara (1-3), J O'Dwyer (1-3), N McGrath (1-0), P Maher (1-0), S Hennessy (0-3), M Heffernan (0-2), P Murphy (0-2), K Morris (0-1), J O'Neill (0-1), B Maher (0-1).

== Championship statistics ==
=== Scoring ===
- Widest winning margin: 29 points
  - Kilkenny 2-31 : 0-8 Offaly (Leinster quarter-final)
- Most goals in a match: 5
  - Tipperary 5-22 : 0-12 Galway (All-Ireland final)
- Most points in a match: 39
  - Kilkenny 2-31 : 0-8 Offaly (Leinster quarter-final)
  - Tipperary 1-22 : 1-17 Clare (Munster final)

== Top scorers ==
Top scorers overall

Rank	Player	County	Tally	Total	Matches	Average
1	Conor McGrath	Clare	1-17	20	2	10.00
2	John O'Dwyer	Tipperary	3-10	19	4	4.75
2	Michael Heffernan	Tipperary	2-13	19	4	4.75
2	Paudie Kehoe	Carlow	1-16	19	2	9.50
2	Mark Bergin	Kilkenny	1-16	19	2	9.50
2	Darren Hamill	Antrim	0-19	19	2	9.50
7	Noel McGrath	Tipperary	1-14	17	4	4.25
8	Séamus Hennessy	Tipperary	1-12	15	4	3.75
8	Seán Carey	Tipperary	1-12	15	4	3.75
8	Ryan Clifford	Cork	0-15	15	2	7.50

Top scorers in a single game

Rank	Player	County	Tally	Total	Opposition
1	Mark Bergin	Kilkenny	1-09	12	Offaly
2	Conor McGrath	Clare	1-08	11	Tipperary
3	Paudie Kehoe	Carlow	0-10	10	Laois
3	Darren Hamill	Antrim	0-10	10	Armagh
5	John O'Dwyer	Tipperary	2-03	9	Antrim
5	Paudie Kehoe	Carlow	1-06	9	Wexford
5	Darren Hamill	Antrim	0-09	9	Down
5	Conor McGrath	Clare	0-09	9	Limerick
5	Ryan Clifford	Cork	0-09	9	Tipperary
5	Michael Lennon	Armagh	0-09	9	Fermanagh
