= 2008–09 All-Ireland Senior Club Hurling Championship =

All-Ireland Senior Club Hurling Championship 2008–09

Championship Details
- Dates: 12 October 2008 – 17 March 2009
- Teams: 16

All Ireland Champions
- Winners: Portumna (3rd win)
- Captain: Ollie Canning
- Manager: Johnny Keane

All Ireland Runners-up
- Runners-up: De La Salle
- Captain: John Mullane
- Manager: Owen Dunphy

Provincial Champions
- Munster: De La Salle
- Leinster: Ballyhale Shamrocks
- Ulster: Ruairí Óg, Cushendall
- Connacht: Not Played

Championship Statistics
- Matches Played: 15

The 2008–09 All-Ireland Senior Club Hurling Championship was the 39th since the establishment of the competition by the Gaelic Athletic Association in 1970–71. The first matches of the season were played on 12 October 2008 and the championship ended on 17 March 2009. Portumna went into the 2008 championship as defending champions, having won their second All-Ireland title the previous year.

The championship culminated with the All-Ireland final, held at Croke Park, Dublin. The match was contested by Portumna and De La Salle. It was their first meeting in the final. Portumna won the game by 2–24 to 1–8. It was their second All-Ireland title in succession and an unprecedented third in four years.

== Format ==
The 2008–09 club championship was played on a straight knock-out basis. Each of the sixteen participating counties enter their respective club champions. The format of the competition was as follows:

Sixteen county club champions participated in the 2008–09 championship. These counties were as follows:

- Leinster: Dublin, Kilkenny, Laois, Offaly, Westmeath, Wexford.
- Munster: Clare, Cork, Limerick, Tipperary, Waterford.
- Connacht: Galway.
- Ulster: Antrim, Armagh, Derry, Down.

Provincial Championships

The Leinster, Munster and Ulster championships were played as usual on a straight knock-out basis. The three respective champions from these provinces advanced directly to the All-Ireland semi-finals.

All-Ireland Series

Semi-finals: (2 matches) The Munster champions played the Ulster champions while the Leinster champions played the champions of Galway. The Galway club champions enter the competition at this stage due to the absence of a provincial club championship in Connacht.

== Participating clubs ==
Team	Colours	County	Most recent success		
Team	Colours	County	All-Ireland	Provincial	County
Adare		Limerick			2007
Ballyboden St. Enda's		Dublin			2007
Ballygalget		Down		2005	2005
Ballyhale Shamrocks		Kilkenny	2007	2007	2007
Birr		Offaly	2003	2007	2007
Clonlara		Clare			1919
De La Salle		Waterford			
Keady Lámh Dhearg		Armagh			2007
Kevin Lynch's		Derry			2007
Portumna		Galway	2008	2007	2007
Ruairí Óg, Cushendall		Antrim		2006	2006
Raharney		Westmeath			2006
Rathdowney		Laois			2006
Sarsfield's		Cork			1957
St. Martin's		Wexford			1999
Toomevara		Tipperary		2006	2006

== Fixtures ==
=== Ulster Senior Club Hurling Championship ===
2008-10-12
Semi-final

Ballygalget	4–13 – 0–12	Keady Lámh Dhearg
A Dynes (0–1), B Coulter (0–2), G Flynn (0–1), M Og Coulter (2–1), Steven Clarke (2–3, 0–1 free), Paddy Coulter (0–3), E Clarke (0–1, a '65'), J McGrattan (0–1, free).	(report)	F McMullan (0–1), G Enright (0–3, 0–1 free), P McCormack (0–2, 0–1 free), P Breen (0–6, 0–5 frees).

Casement Park, Belfast
Referee: J. Devlin (Tyrone)

2008-10-12
Semi-final

Ruairí Óg, Cushendall	3–11 – 2–8	Kevin Lynch's
S Delargy (0–4), K McKeegan (0–1), D McNaughton (0–1), P McGill (1–2, 0–1 free), A Delargy (0–1); S McNaughton (2–2, 0–1 sideline cut).	(report)	P Sweeney (0–1), C Herron (1–0, pen), K Hinphey (0–1), F McGuigan (0–1), F Kelly (1–0), R O'Kane (0–3, all frees), G McGonigle (0–1, free)

Casement Park, Belfast
Referee: D. Magee (Down)

2008-10-19
Final

Ruairí Óg, Cushendall	1–14 – 1–13	Ballygalget
S Delargy (0–1), P McGill (0–6, 0–4 frees, 0–1 pen), A Delargy (0–1); S McNaughton (0–3), N McManus (0–1), C McCambridge (1–1), B McNaughton (0–1).	(report)	P Monan (0–1, sideline cut), S Clarke (0–2); M Og Coulter (0–10, 0–8 frees), P Coulter (1–0)

Casement Park, Belfast
Referee: M Mulholland (Derry)

=== Leinster Senior Club Hurling Championship ===
2008-11-02
Quarter-final

Ballyhale Shamrocks	1–18 – 1–11	Rathdowney
J “Cha” Fitzpatrick (0–2, one free), M Fennelly (0–1); H Shefflin (0–8, five frees), TJ Reid (0–5); P Reid (0–1), E Reid (1–0), D Hoyne (0–1).	(report)	B Campion (0–5, four frees, one 65), S Dollard (0–1), E Meagher (0–1, a free), E Holohan (0–1), J Phelan (1–3).

Nowlan Park, Kilkenny
Referee: B Kelly (Westmeath)

2008-11-08
Quarter-final

Birr	1–17 – 0–8	Ballyboden St. Enda's
S Whelahan (0–6, 0–4 frees), S Brown (1–1, 0–1 free), G Hanniffy (0–3), D Hayden (0–2), B Whelahan (0–2), S Ryan (0–2), B Lonergan (0–1).	(report)	David Curtin (0–3, 0–2 65's & 0–1 free), Paul Ryan (0–2, 0–1 free), Conal Keaney (0–1), Mick Griffin (0–1), Dave O'Connor (0–1).

Parnell Park, Dublin
Referee: D Murphy (Wexford)

2008-11-16
Semi-final

Birr	2–19 – 2–15 AET	St. Martin's
S Whelahan 0–9f, D Molloy, S Ryan 1–0 each, G Hanniffy, P Cleary (0–1f, 0–2 '65s) 0–3 each, R Hanniffy 0–2, B Lonergan, P O'Meara 0–1 each.	(report)	D Lyng 0–6 (0–4f), B Lambert 0–4, P Kelly 1–0, R Quigley 1–0, E Quigley, T Waters 0–2 each, C Lyng 0–1.

O'Connor Park, Tullamore
Referee: D Connolly (Kilkenny)

2008-11-16
Semi-final

Ballyhale Shamrocks	0–26 – 0–9	Raharney
B Aylward (0–1); J 'Cha' Fitzpatrick (0–2), M Fennelly (0–3), H Shefflin (0–10, seven frees), TJ Reid (0–2); E Reid (0–6), D Hoyne (0–1), T Coogan (0–1).	(report)	B Connaughton (0–2 frees); F Boyle (0–1), J Shaw (0–4, 0–3 frees), B Keogh (0–2).

Cusack Park, Mullingar
Referee: E Morris (Dublin)

2008-11-30
Final

Ballyhale Shamrocks	2–13 – 0–11	Birr
H. Shefflin 0–7 (0–5 frees); TJ Reid and E. Reid 1–1 each; M. Aylward 0–2; C. Fennelly and M. Fennelly 0–1 each.	(report)	S. Whelahan 0–7 (frees); Brian Whelahan 1–1; P. O’Meara 0–2; D. Hayden 0–1.

Nowlan Park, Kilkenny
Referee: F Smith (Meath)

=== Munster Senior Club Hurling Championship ===
2008-11-02
Quarter-final

Sarsfield's	0–26 – 0–10	Clonlara
P Ryan 0–14 (0–11 frees); C McCarthy 0–5 (0–1 pen); E O’Driscoll 0–3; T Óg Murphy, M Cussen 0–2 each.	(report)	D Madden 0–6 (0–5 frees); C O’Donovan, T O’Donovan, J Conlon, T Lynch 0–1 each.

Páirc Uí Chaoimh, Cork
Referee: J Ryan (Tipperary)

2008-11-16
Semi-final

De La Salle	0–18 – 0–16	Sarsfield's
J. Mullane 0–5; B. Phelan 0–5 (0–2 frees, 0–1 ‘65); J. Quirke 0–4 frees; C. Watt 0–2; D. Twomey and P. Nevin 0–1 each.	(report)	P. Ryan 0–6 frees; M. Cussen 0–4; K. Murphy 0–3; R. Murphy, D. Kearney and D. Roche 0–1 each.

Páirc Uí Chaoimh, Cork
Referee: D. O’Driscoll (Limerick)

2008-11-16
Semi-final

Adare	1–11 – 0–10	Toomevara
C. Fitzgerald 0–6 (0–4 frees, 0–1 65); L. Costello 1–0; D. Sheehan 0–2; D. Sexton 0–2; M. Foley 0–1.	(report)	K. Dunne 0–3 (all frees); W. Ryan 0–2; F. Devanney 0–2; J. McLoughney 0–2 (0–1 free, 0–1 65); J. O’Brien 0–1.

Gaelic Grounds, Limerick
Referee: D. Kirwan (Cork)

2008-11-30
Final

De La Salle	1–9 – 0–10	Adare
J. Mullane 1–2; B. Phelan 0–3 (0–2 frees); J. Quirke 0–3 (all frees); S. Prendergast 0–1.	(report)	L. Costello 0–3; C. Fitzgerald 0–3 (all frees); A. O’Connell 0–2; D. Sexton, D. Sheehan, 0–1 each.

Semple Stadium, Thurles
Referee: J. Ryan (Boherlahan-Dualla)

=== All-Ireland Senior Club Hurling Championship ===
2009-02-22
Semi-final
14:30 BST

De La Salle	1–21 – 1–19 AET	Ruairí Óg, Cushendall
B Phelan 0–6 (4f, 2 sideline); J Mullane 0–5; D Twomey 1–0; L Hayes 0–3; P Nevin 0–2; J Quirke, D McGrath, S Daniels D Greene & B Farrell 0–1 each.	(report)	K McKeegan 0–5 (5f); C McCambridge (1f) and N McManus, 0–4 each; S McNaughton 1–1; A Delargy 0–3; A Graffin & S Delargy 0–1 each.

Parnell Park, Dublin
Referee: E Morris (Dublin)

2009-02-22
Semi-final
14:30 BST

Ballyhale Shamrocks	1–16 – 5–11	Portumna
H. Shefflin 0–10 (0–7 frees, 0–2 65’s); E. Reid 1–0; M. Aylward 0–2; C. Fennelly 0–2; TJ Reid (s/L), D. Hoyne, 0–1 each.	(report)	J. Canning 2–5 (1–0 pen., 0–2 65’s, 0–1 free, 0–1 sideline); D. Hayes 2–1; C. Ryan 1–0; K. Hayes 0–2; A. Smith, N. Hayes, L. Smith, 0–1 each.

Semple Stadium, Thurles
Attendance: 10,726
Referee: J. Ryan (Tipperary)

2009-03-17
Final
14:30 BST

Portumna	2–24 – 1–8	De La Salle
D Hayes 2–2; J Canning 0–9 (0–7 frees, 0–1 sideline); N Hayes 0–5; K Hayes 0–2; A Smith 0–2; D Canning, M Ryan, E Lynch, L Smith, 0–1 each	(report)	P Nevin 1–0; B Phelan 0–2 (frees); T Kearney 0–2; S Brenner (pen), J Mullane, D Russell, J Quirke (free), 0–1 each

Croke Park, Dublin
Attendance: 32,000
Referee: J. McGrath (Westmeath)

Portumna	De La Salle

PORTUMNA:
GK	1	Ivan Canning
RCB	2	Martin Dolphin
FB	3	Eugene McEntee (substituted off) 60'
LCB	4	Ollie Canning (c)
RWB	5	Gareth Heagney (substituted off) 59'
CB	6	Míchéal Ryan
LWB	7	Aidan Donnelly (substituted off) 60'
M	8	Eoin Lynch
M	9	Leo Smith (substituted off) 59'
RWF	10	Niall Hayes
CF	11	Kevin Hayes
LWF	12	Andrew Smith
RCF	13	Damien Hayes
FF	14	Joe Canning
LCF	15	Ciarán Ryan (substituted off) 56'
Substitutes:
LCF		Davy Canning (substituted in) 56'
RWB		Michael Gill (substituted in) 59'
MD		Peter Smith (substituted in) 59'
LCB		John O'Flaherty (substituted in) 60'
LWB		Pierce Treacy (substituted in) 60'

DE LA SALLE:
GK	1	Stephen Brenner
RCB	2	Alan Kelly
FB	3	Ian Flynn
LCB	4	Michael Doherty
RWB	5	Darren Russell
CB	6	Kevin Moran
LWB	7	Stephen Daniels
M	8	Bryan Phelan
M	9	Conor Watt (substituted off) 57'
RWF	10	Paudie Nevin
CF	11	Derek McGrath (substituted off) 18'
LWF	12	Lee Hayes (substituted off) 11'
RCF	13	Dean Twomey (substituted off) 57'
FF	14	John Mullane (c)
LCF	15	David Greene
Substitutes:
RCF		Brian Farrell (substituted in) 11' (substituted off) 30'
CF		Thomas Kearney (substituted in) 18'
RCF		James Quirke (substituted in) 30'
MD		Alan O'Neill (substituted in) 57'
RCF		Dermot Dooley (substituted in) 57'

Match Rules

- 60 minutes
- Replay if scores level
- Maximum of 5 substitutions

== Championship statistics ==
=== Scoring ===
- Widest winning margin: 26 points
  - Portumna 2–24 : 1–8 De La Salle (All-Ireland final)
- Most goals in a match: 6
  - Portumna 5–11 : 1–16 Ballyhale Shamrocks (All-Ireland semi-final)
- Most points in a match: 40
  - De La Salle 1–21 : 1–19 Ruairí Óg, Cushendall (All-Ireland semi-final)
- Most goals by one team in a match: 5
  - Portumna 5–11 : 1–16 Ballyhale Shamrocks (All-Ireland semi-final)
- Most points by one team in a match: 26
  - Ballyhale Shamrocks 0–26 : 0–9 Raharney (Leinster semi-final)
  - Sarsfield's 0–26 : 0–10 Clonlara (Munster quarter-final)

== Top scorers ==
=== Season ===
Rank	Player	Club	Tally	Total	Matches	Average
1	Henry Shefflin	Ballyhale Shamrocks	0–35	35	4	8.75
2	Simon Whelahan	Birr	0–22	22	3	7.33
3	Pat Ryan	Sarsfield's	0–20	20	2	10.00
3	Joe Canning	Portumna	2–14	20	2	10.00
4	Martin Óg Coulter	Ballygalget	2–11	17	2	8.50
5	John Mullane	De La Salle	1–13	16	4	4.00
5	Brian Phelan	De La Salle	0–16	16	4	4.00
6	Damien Hayes	Portumna	4-03	15	2	7.50
6	Shane McNaughton	Ruairí Óg	3-06	15	3	5.00
7	Steven Clarke	Ballygalget	2-05	11	2	5.50

=== Single game ===
Rank	Player	Club	Tally	Total	Opposition
1	Pat Ryan	Sarsfield's	0–14	14	Clonlara
2	Joe Canning	Portumna	2–05	11	Ballyhale Shamrocks
3	Henry Shefflin	Ballyhale Shamrocks	0–10	10	Portumna
3	Henry Shefflin	Ballyhale Shamrocks	0–10	10	Raharney
3	Martin Óg Coulter	Ballygalget	0–10	10	Ruairí Óg, Cushendall
4	Steven Clarke	Ballygalget	2–03	9	Keady Lámh Dhearg
4	Joe Canning	Portumna	0–09	9	De La Salle
4	Simon Whelahan	Birr	0–09	9	St. Martin's
5	Damien Hayes	Portumna	2–02	8	De La Salle
5	Shane McNaughton	Ruairí Óg, Cushendall	2–02	8	Kevin Lynch's
5	Henry Shefflin	Ballyhale Shamrocks	0–08	8	Rathdowney

== Referees ==
The following referees were used during the championship:

Name	County	Games
James McGrath	Westmeath	1
Diarmuid Kirwan	Cork	1
Declan O'Driscoll	Limerick	1
Johnny Ryan	Tipperary	3
F. Smith	Meath	1
Éamonn Moris	Dublin	2
Dommo Connolly	Kilkenny	1
Dickie Murphy	Wexford	1
Barry Kelly	Westmeath	1
Martin Mulholland	Derry	1
Declan Magee	Down	1
John Devlin	Tyrone	1

== Stadia ==
The following stadia were used during the championship:

County	Stadium	Capacity
Dublin	Croke Park	82,300
Tipperary	Semple Stadium	55,000
Limerick	Gaelic Grounds	50,000
Cork	Páirc Uí Chaoimh	43,500
Antrim	Casement Park	32,600
Kilkenny	Nowlan Park	30,000
Offaly	O'Connor Park	20,000
Westmeath	Cusack Park	15,000
Dublin	Parnell Park	13,500

Preceded by Championship 2007–08	All-Ireland Senior Club Hurling Championship; 2008–09	Succeeded by Championship 2009–10
