= Edward Coady =

Irish hurler

Personal information
- Native name: Éamonn Mac Oda (Irish)
- Born: 1978 (age 47–48) Borris, County Carlow, Ireland

Sport
- Sport: Hurling
- Position: Left wing-back
Club
- Years: Club
- 1997-present: Mount Leinster Rangers
Club titles
- Carlow titles: 8
- Leinster titles: 1
Inter-county
- Years: County
- 1999-present: Carlow
Inter-county titles
- Leinster titles: 0
- All-Irelands: 0
- NHL: 0
- All Stars: 0

Edward "Eddie" Coady (born 1978) is an Irish hurler who plays as a left corner-forward for the Carlow senior team.

Coady made his first appearance for the team during the 1999 National League and has become a regular member of the starting fifteen since then. During that time he has won two Christy Ring Cup medals, one National League (Division 2A) medal and three Kehoe Cup medals.

At club level Coady is an All-Ireland and Leinster medalist at intermediate level with Mount Leinster Rangers. He has also won four county senior championship medals.

== Honours ==
- Carlow Senior Hurling Championship (8) 2006 2007 2009 2011 2012 2013 2017 2018
- Carlow Senior Hurling League (1) 2011
- Leinster Intermediate Club Hurling Championship (1) 2011
- All-Ireland Intermediate Club Hurling Championship (1) 2012
- Christy Ring Cup (3) 2008 2009 2017
- Kehoe Cup (3) 1999 2005 2006
- National Hurling League Division 2 (1) 2008
- National Hurling League Division 2A (1) 2012
- Leinster Senior Club Hurling Championship (1) (2013)

Sporting positions
Preceded by	Carlow Senior Hurling Captain; 2008	Succeeded by Mark Brennan
Preceded by Mark Brennan	Carlow Senior Hurling Captain; 2010	Succeeded by Paudie Kehoe
Preceded by Paudie Kehoe	Carlow Senior Hurling Joint-Captain; 2012	Succeeded by Incumbent
Achievements
Preceded by Darren McCormack (Westmeath)	Christy Ring Cup Final winning captain 2008	Succeeded by Mark Brennan (Carlow)
