= Sean Carey (Gaelic footballer) =

Irish hurler and Gaelic football player

Seán Carey
Personal information
- Native name: Seán Ó Ciardha (Irish)
- Born: 15 November 1989 (age 36) Clonmel, Ireland
- Height: 1.75 m (5 ft 9 in)

Sport
- Position: Right Half Forward
Club
- Years: Club
- 2006-: Moyle Rovers
Club titles
	Football	Hurling
Tipperary titles	2	0
Inter-county
- Years: County
- 2009-: Tipperary (football)
Inter-county titles
	Football	Hurling
Munster Titles	0	0
All-Ireland Titles	0	0
League titles	1 (Div 3)	0
All-Stars	0	0

Seán Carey (born 15 November 1989) is a Gaelic footballer and hurler from County Tipperary. He plays with the Moyle Rovers Club and the Tipperary intercounty team. In 2010 he helped Tipperary win the Munster Under-21 Football Championship and [Munster Under-21 Hurling Championship. He later won the 2010 All-Ireland Under-21 Hurling Championship. In 2007 he won Munster Minor Hurling Championship & All-Ireland Minor Hurling Championship medals. He won Tipperary Senior Football Championship medal in 2009 with Moyle Rovers. Seán made his Championship debut for the Tipperary Senior Football against Limerick in the first round of the Munster Senior Football Championship. Sean captained the 2007 Tipperary Minor Football team and has also played Under 21 Football with Tipperary. He also won an All-Ireland Minor Hurling medal in 2007 playing at wing-forward scoring two goals against Cork in the final

== Honours ==
=== Club ===
- Tipperary Senior Football Championship (2): 2007, 2009

=== County ===
- Munster Minor Hurling Championship (1): 2007
- All-Ireland Minor Hurling Championship (1): 2007
- Munster Under-21 Football Championship (1): 2010
- Munster Under-21 Hurling Championship (1): 2010
- National Football League Division 3 (1): 2009
