= James Dempsey (hurler) =

Irish hurler

Personal information
- Native name: Séamus Ó Díomsaigh (Irish)
- Born: 1989 (age 36–37) Kinnitty, County Offaly, Ireland
- Occupation: Engineer
- Height: 6 ft 1 in (185 cm)

Sport
- Sport: Hurling
- Position: Goalkeeper
Club
- Years: Club
- Kinnitty
Club titles
- Offaly titles: 0
College
- Years: College
- University of Limerick
Inter-county*
Years	County	Apps (scores)
2010-present	Offaly	15 (0-00)
Inter-county titles
- Leinster titles: 0
- All-Irelands: 0
- NHL: 1
- All Stars: 0
- *Inter County team apps and scores correct as of 17:11, 26 June 2015.

James Dempsey (born 1989) is an Irish hurler who plays as a goalkeeper for the Offaly senior team.

Born in Kinnitty, County Offaly, Dempsey first arrived on the inter-county scene at the age of nineteen when he first linked up with the Offaly under-21 team. He made his senior debut during the 2010 league. Dempsey has since become a regular member of the starting 15.

At club level Dempsey plays with Kinnitty.
