= Shane McNaughton =

Irish hurler

Personal information
- Native name: Seán Mac Neachtain (Irish)
- Born: 1988 (38 years ago) Cushendall, County Antrim, Northern Ireland
- Occupation: Stone mason/Actor
- Height: 6 ft 0 in (183 cm)

Sport
- Sport: Hurling
- Position: Right wing-forward
Club
- Years: Club
- 2005-present: Ruairí Óg Cushendall
Club titles
- Antrim titles: 3
- Ulster titles: 2
Inter-county
Years	County	Apps (scores)
2007-present	Antrim	9 (4-68)
Inter-county titles
- Ulster titles: 6
- Leinster titles: 0
- All-Irelands: 0
- NHL: 0
- All Stars: 0

Shane McNaughton (born 1988) is an Irish hurler who currently plays as a right wing-forward for the Antrim senior team. As of 2017, Shane is also currently studying in the Stella Adler School of Acting in New York City.

== Playing career ==
=== Inter-county ===
McNaughton made his first appearance for the team during the 2007 championship and gradually became a regular member of the team. Since then he has won five Ulster medals. In 2011 he withdrew from Antrims Championship team to play in New York for the summer. He returned and has been Antrims top score getter in the 2012 National Hurling League.

=== Club ===
At club level McNaughton is a double Ulster medalist with the Ruairí Óg Cushendall club. He has also won three county championship medals.

=== Inter-provincial ===
McNaughton has also lined out with Ulster in the inter-provincial series of games.

McNaughton has also won numerous individual awards such as, Ulster writer awards and AIB Ulster hurler of the year.

His father, Terence 'Sambo' McNaughton, also played hurling with Antrim and later managed the team.
