= Séamus Murphy (Carlow hurler) =

Irish hurler

Séamus Murphy (born 1986) is an Irish hurler who plays as a right corner-forward for the Carlow senior team.

Born in Bahana, County Carlow, Murphy first arrived on the inter-county scene when he first linked up with the Carlow minor team, before later joining the under-21 side. He later joined the senior team and immediately became a regular member of the starting fifteen.

At club level he is a two-time championship medallist with St Mullin's.

== Honours ==
=== Player ===
St Mullin's Carlow Senior Hurling Championship (5): 2010, 2014, 2015, 2016, 2019

Carlow

- Christy Ring Cup (1): 2008

=== Individual ===
Awards Carlow Hurler of the Year (2): 2010, 2016

Sporting positions
Preceded by Edward Coady	Carlow Senior Hurling Captain (jointly with Alan Corcoran); 2015	Succeeded by Incumbent
