= Paudie Kehoe =

Irish hurler

Personal information
- Native name: Páidí Mac Eochaidh (Irish)
- Born: 1990 (age 35–36) Bahana, County Carlow, Ireland

Sport
- Sport: Hurling
- Position: Left corner-forward
Club
- Years: Club
- 2007–present: St Mullin's
Club titles
- Carlow titles: 4
Inter-county
- Years: County
- 2009–present: Carlow
Inter-county titles
- Leinster titles: 0
- All-Irelands: 0
- NHL: 0
- All Stars: 0

Paudie Kehoe (born 1990) is an Irish hurler who plays as a left corner-forward for the Carlow senior team.

Kehoe made his first appearance for the team during the 2009 Christy Ring Cup and has become a regular member of the starting fifteen since then. During that time he has won one Christy Ring Cup medal.

At the club level, Kehoe has won four county championship medal with St Mullin's.

== Honours ==
- Carlow Senior Hurling Championship (4) 2010, 2014, 2015 (c), 2016
- Christy Ring Cup (1) 2009
- National Hurling League Division 2A (1) 2012

Sporting positions
Preceded by Edward Coady	Carlow Senior Hurling Captain; 2011	Succeeded by Incumbent
