= Alan Corcoran =

Irish hurler

Personal information
- Native name: Ailéin Ó Corcáin (Irish)
- Born: 1989 (age 36–37) Bagenalstown, County Carlow, Ireland

Sport
- Sport: Hurling
- Position: Right corner-back
Club
- Years: Club
- Erin's Own
Club titles
- Carlow titles: 0
Inter-county*
Years	County	Apps (scores)
2013-present	Carlow	107 (0-00)
Inter-county titles
- Leinster titles: 0
- All-Irelands: 0
- NHL: 0
- All Stars: 0
- *Inter County team apps and scores correct as of 16:11, 26 June 2015.

Alan Corcoran (born 1989) is an Irish hurler who plays as a right corner-back for the Carlow senior team.

Born in Bagenalstown, County Carlow, Corcoran first played competitive hurling during his schooling at Presentation De La Salle. He arrived on the inter-county scene at the age of seventeen when he first linked up with the Carlow minor team before later joining the under-21 side. He made his senior debut during the 2011 league. Corcoran has since become a regular member of the starting fifteen.

At club level Corcoran plays with Erin's Own.

Corcoran concluded his tenure with Carlow after making more than 100 competitive appearances for his county. He earned accolades including a Christy Ring Medal, a Joe McDonagh Championship victory, and a National Hurling League Division 2 title.

== Honours ==
=== Player ===
Carlow

- All-Ireland Under 21 B Hurling Championship (1): 2008
- Leinster Under-21 A Hurling Championship (1): 2008
- Christy Ring Championship (1): 2017
- Joe McDonagh Championship (1): 2018
- NHL Division 2 (1): 2017

Sporting positions
Preceded by Edward Coady	Carlow Senior Hurling Joint-Captain; 2015	Succeeded by Incumbent
