= 2004 Munster Senior Hurling Championship final =

- Event: 2004 Munster Senior Hurling Championship
Waterford	Cork
3-16	1-21
- Date: 27 June 2004
- Venue: Semple Stadium, Thurles
- Man of the Match: Paul Flynn (Waterford)
- Referee: Seanie McMahon (Clare)
- Attendance: 52,100

The 2004 Munster Senior Hurling Championship final was a hurling match played on 27 June 2004 at Semple Stadium, Thurles, County Tipperary. It was contested by Cork and Waterford. Waterford claimed their second Munster Championship of the decade, beating Cork on a scoreline of 3–16 to 1-21, a 1-point winning margin. Overall, this was Waterford's seventh Munster Senior Hurling Championship. The final, which swung both ways numerous times, including numerous goals and a sending off, is considered one of the greatest Munster Hurling Finals of all time. In Ireland, the match was televised live on The Sunday Game on RTÉ Two, with commentary from Ger Canning and Michael Duignan.

== Previous Munster Final encounters ==
Previous to this encounter, the teams had met each other in twelve Munster Hurling Finals, including a replay in 1931. Cork led the rivalry, having won eight finals in comparison to Waterford's three wins. Notable finals include 1982 when Cork beat Waterford by 31 points (Munster Final record) and in the previous year's final when Cork beat Waterford by 4 points even after a hat trick of goals by Waterford's John Mullane.

Year	Venue	Cork score	Waterford score	Match report
1903	Tipperary Town	5-16 (31)	1-01 (4)	
1929	Fraher Field, Dungarvan	4-06 (18)	2-03 (9)	
1931	Clonmel	1-09 (12)	4-00 (12)	
1931	Clonmel	5-04 (19)	1-02 (5)	
1943	Cork Athletic Grounds, Cork	2-13 (19)	3-08 (17)	
1948	Semple Stadium, Thurles	3-09 (18)	4-07 (19)	
1957	Semple Stadium, Thurles	1-06 (9)	1-11 (14)	
1959	Semple Stadium, Thurles	2-09 (15)	3-09 (18)	
1966	Gaelic Grounds, Limerick	4-09 (21)	2-09 (15)	
1982	Semple Stadium, Thurles	5-31 (46)	3-06 (15)	
1983	Cork Athletic Grounds, Cork	3-22 (31)	0-12 (12)	
2003	Semple Stadium, Thurles	3-16 (25)	3-12 (21)	Irish Examiner

== Match ==
=== Details ===
27 June 2004
Munster Final

Cork	1-21 - 3-16	Waterford
J. Deane 0-9; G. McCarthy 1-0; B. O'Connor 0-4; T. Kenny 0-3; B. Corcoran 0-2; J. O'Connor 0-2; R. Curran 0-1	(Report)	P. Flynn 1-7; D. Shanahan 1-3; E. Kelly 1-1; J. Mullane 0-2; D. Bennett 0-1; K. McGrath 0-1; S. Prendergast 0-1

Semple Stadium, Thurles
Referee: S. McMahon (Clare)

Cork	Waterford

CORK GAA:
1	Dónal Óg Cusack
2	Wayne Sherlock
3	Diarmuid O'Sullivan	(substituted off) 35'
4	Brian Murphy
5	John Gardiner
6	Ronan Curran
7	Seán Óg Ó hAilpín
8	Tom Kenny	(substituted off) 46'
9	Jerry O'Connor
10	Garvan McCarthy	(substituted off) 56'
11	Niall McCarthy
12	Timmy McCarthy	(substituted off) 69'
13	Ben O'Connor
14	Brian Corcoran	(substituted off) 35'
15	Joe Deane
Substitutes:
16	Paul Morrissey
17	Cian O'Connor
18	John Browne
19	Graham Callinan
20	Mickey O'Connell
21	Paul Tierney	(substituted on) 46'
22	John Anderson
23	Jonathan O'Callaghan
24	Kieran Murphy	(substituted on) 35'
25	Martin Coleman
26	Eamonn Collins	(substituted on) 56'
27	Michael Byrne
Manager:
Dónal O'Grady

WATERFORD GAA:
1	Stephen Brenner
2	Eoin Murphy
3	James Murray
4	Declan Prendergast
5	Bryan Phelan
6	Ken McGrath (c)
7	Tony Browne
8	Dave Bennett		(substituted off) 50'
9	Eoin McGrath		(substituted off) 66'
10	Eoin Kelly
11	Dan Shanahan
12	Michael Walsh
13	John Mullane	(red card) 38'
14	Seamus Prendergast
15	Paul Flynn
Substitutes:
16	Ian O'Regan
17	Tom Feeney
18	Brian Wall
19	Paul O'Brien		(substituted on) 50'	(substituted off) 70'
20	Jack Kennedy		(substituted on) 70'
21	Andy Moloney
22	Liam Lawlor
23	Shane O'Sullivan		(substituted on) 66'
24	David O'Brien
25	Sean Ryan
26	Ger Quinlan
27	Denis Coffey
28	John Wall
29	Andrew Kirwan
30	Wayne Hutchinson
Manager:
Justin McCarthy

Man of the Match:
Paul Flynn

Linesmen:
Pat Horan (Offaly)
Barry Kelly (Westmeath)

Sideline Official
Andrew Monaghan (Clare)

== See also ==
- Cork–Waterford hurling rivalry
