= Cork–Waterford hurling rivalry =

Gaelic games rivalry

Cork-Waterford
- Location: County Cork; County Waterford
- Teams: Cork; Waterford
- First meeting: Cork 2-8 - 0-0 Water. 1888 Munster semi-final (22 July 1888)
- Latest meeting: Waterford 2-25 - 1-25 Cork; 2024 Munster Round 1 (21 April 2024)
- Next meeting: TBA

Statistics
- Total meetings: 72
- Most player appearances: Tony Browne (12)
- Top scorer: Christy Ring (11-37)
- All-time series: Championship: Cork 50-16 Waterford (6 draws)
- Largest victory: Cork 13-4 - 0-1 Water. 1923 Munster quarter-final (24 June 1923)

The Cork-Waterford rivalry is a hurling rivalry between Irish county teams Cork and Waterford, who first played each other in 1888. Since the turn of the century it has come to be regarded as one of the biggest rivalries in Gaelic games. Cork's home ground is Páirc Uí Chaoimh and Waterford's home ground is Walsh Park, however, championship meetings between the two sides have generally been held at neutral venues.

While Cork are the standard bearers in Munster, Waterford have enjoyed success at sporadic intervals. At All-Ireland level Cork are second on the all-time roll of honour with thirty titles, while Waterford have claimed just two All-Ireland titles.

It was the subject of a Laochra Gael episode on 22 April 2010, which covered the games between 2000 and 2007.

== History ==
=== Early years ===
The first clash of Cork and Waterford occurred on 22 July 1888 in the inaugural Munster championship. It was Cork's second ever championship game while Waterford were making their very first appearance in the championship. For the first fifty years of the championship Cork held the Indian sign over the near neighbours and regularly dished out thirty and forty point drubbings.

=== Waterford emerge ===
In 1938 Waterford and Cork faced each other in the Munster semi-final. The Rebels had been going through a downturn since winning their last All-Ireland in 1931, while Waterford had been steadily improving. On that occasion Waterford recorded their first ever championship victory over Cork with a 5-2 to 1-3 score line.

Cork resumed their dominance over the next four meetings, however, when the sides met in the Munster final in 1948, Waterford edged a thrilling game. A narrow 4-7 to 3-9 victory gave Waterford their second ever championship victory over the Rebels.

=== The first great rivalry of the 21st century ===
It used be Cork and Tipp. Kilkenny and Wexford for
years grabbed the headlines. Clare and Limerick
tried valiantly but let's call it straight and blunt.
Nothing compares at the beginning of this century
to Cork and Waterford clashes.

— Marty Morrissey.

After an absence of eight years, Cork and Waterford faced off in the championship in a Munster semi-final on 13 June 1999. Waterford, as provincial runners-up the previous year, were installed as favourites against a young and inexperienced Cork team. Mickey O'Connell proved the star for Cork as they recorded a 0-24 to 1-15 victory.

Three years later in 2002 Cork and Waterford clashed in another Munster semi-final. A new-look Waterford, sporting blue shorts for the first time in twenty years, shaded a thrilling game by 1-16 to 1-15. It was their first defeat of the Rebels in 13 years.

John Mullane will wake up this morning feeling as if
he won the Lotto but mislaid the ticket. The Waterford
corner-forward delivered the near-perfect performance
in yesterday's Guinness Munster hurling final at Semple
Stadium but still had to watch through bewildered eyes
afterwards as Cork captain Alan Browne waved the
trophy in joyous celebration of another great Leeside
triumph.

— The Irish Independent sums up John Mullane's fate
after the 2003 Munster final.

In 2003 Cork faced Waterford in the Munster final after a winter of discontent on Leeside had seen the hurling panel go on strike for better treatment and conditions. A high-scoring game saw John Mullane top score with 3-1, however, it wasn't enough as Cork triumphed by 3-16 to 3-12.

Twelve months later and Cork and Waterford produced what has been described as one of hurling's greatest games of the modern era. Cork, as reigning champions, had played against a wind in the opening half and built up a 1-14 to 2-8 lead. In the circumstances they looked comfortable, particularly as John Mullane had been dismissed at the start of the second half. But a Paul Flynn free that flew straight to the net changed everything in the second half, and with Flynn adding another five points and Ken McGrath leading the 14-man resistance from centre-back, Waterford prevailed, McGrath's catch at the very end as they protected a one-point lead the game's signature moment.

In 2005 the championship produced two games between Cork and Waterford. A two-point victory for Cork in the Munster semi-final was followed by an All-Ireland quarter-final meeting in Croke Park. A Brian Corcoran drop goal was the highlight of the game as Cork triumphed by 1-18 to 1-13.

After avoiding each other in the provincial series in 2006, the sides subsequently met in the All-Ireland semi-final. On a day when it looked as if Waterford would finally break their semi-final hoodoo and reach their first All-Ireland decider in forty-three years, Cork produced a new forward in the form of Cathal Naughton. Waterford had gone four points ahead when Naughton was sprung from the bench and captured 1-1 inside two minutes. A late Ken McGrath free was batted away by Cork goalkeeper Donal Óg Cusack. An almighty scrap for possession ensued with Cork emerging with the ball at the stroke of full-time.

Cork and Waterford clashed on three separate occasions during the 2007 championship. Cork stalwarts Donal Óg Cusack, Diarmuid O'Sullivan and Seán Óg Ó hAilpín were suspended for the Munster semi-final tie which saw Waterford dethrone reigning provincial champions Cork. After a pulsating eight-goal encounter, the Déise emerged as 5-15 to 3-18 winners. Both sides faced each other again in the All-Ireland quarter-final at Croke Park in front of a record attendance of 72,426 for this fixture. Both sides provided another pulsating chapter to their rivalry with the game still alive deep in time added on. Substitute Eoin McGrath got inside the Cork defence at the Canal End with his side trailing by one point and time ticking away. His shot was saved by Cork goalkeeper Donal Óg Cusack, the rebound came out to Paul Flynn who pulled first time only to see it saved on the line by Diarmuid O'Sullivan. Cusack seemed to lie on the ball and was immediately challenged by Flynn. The resultant free saw Eoin Kelly tap to sliotar over the bar to level the game at 3-16 apiece and force a replay. The third game between the two was a tense affair, with Dan Shanahan netting a brace of goals to seal a 2-17 to 0-20 victory.

After nine meetings in six championships, the Cork-Waterford rivalry took a three-year hiatus and resumed with a Munster final clash in 2010. Once again the game was a close affair with veteran Tony Browne scoring a late goal to level the match at 2-15 apiece. The replay created a piece of history as it was the first Munster decider to be played on a Saturday night under floodlights. When the sides finished level at the end of 70 minutes, it became the first Munster final replay to go to extra time since 1987. Dan Shanahan, who was introduced as a substitute for the injured John Mullane, scored the deciding goal in a 1-16 to 1-13 victory.

In 2012 both sides clashed in the All-Ireland quarter-final. Waterford led by three points entering the final stages, however, Cork outscored the Déise by 0-7 to 0-1 in the last five minutes to secure a 1-19 to 0-19 victory.

In their first Munster quarter-final clash in 39 years, Cork faced a scare against Waterford in the opening game of the 2014 championship. Trailing by nine points at one stage, the Rebels fought back to secure a 1-21 apiece draw before winning the replay by 14 points.

In 2015, Waterford won their third hurling league title with a comprehensive ten-point victory over Cork in the first decider between the counties since 1998. They followed this up five weeks later by beating Cork in the semi-final of the Munster championship by five points, their first Championship victory over the Rebels for five years.

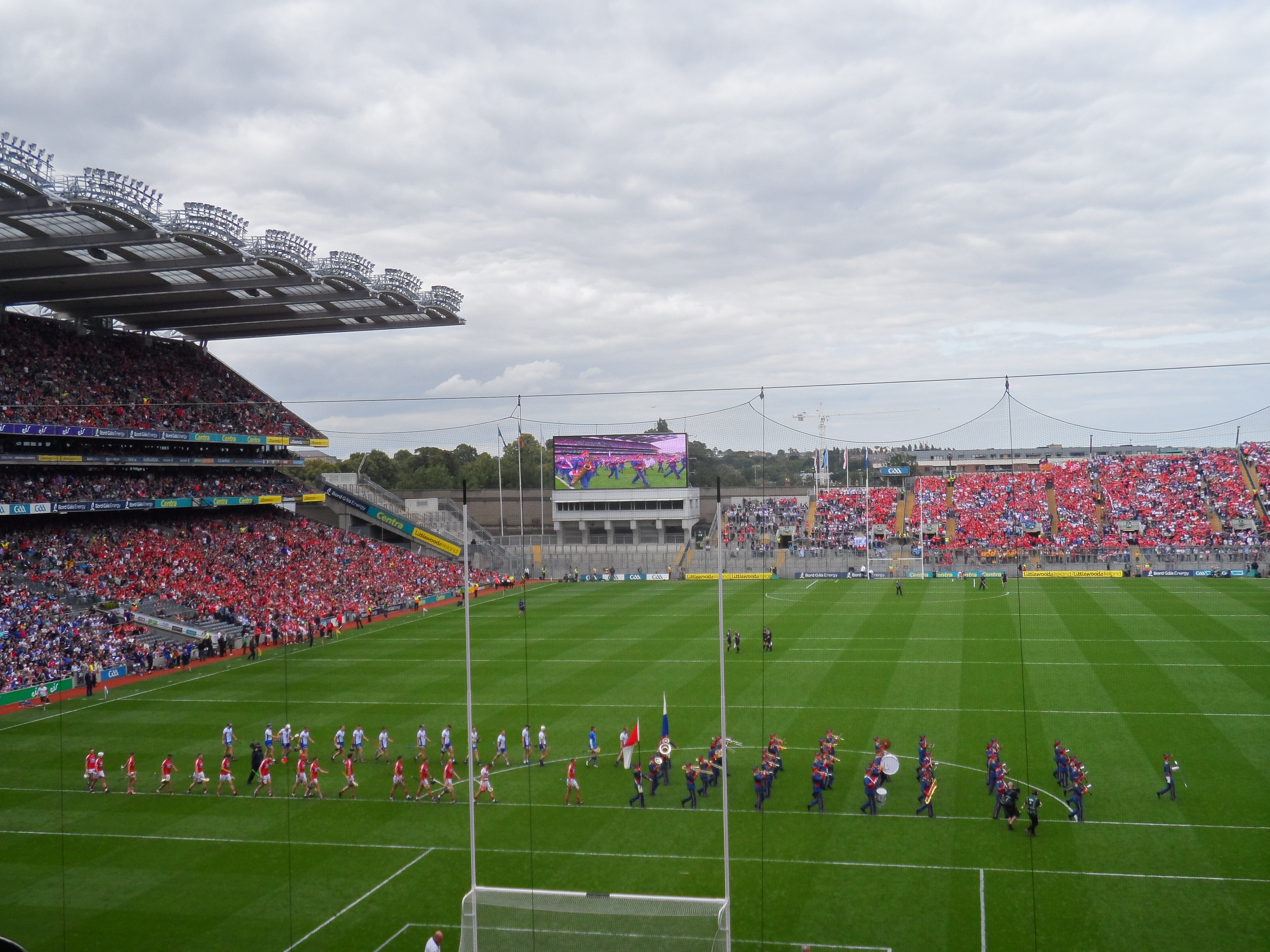
Cork and Waterford teams prior to the 2017 All Ireland Semifinal

== Statistics ==
Up to date as of 2023 season

Team	All-Ireland	Provincial	National League	Total
Cork	30	54	14	98
Waterford	2	9	4	15
Combined	32	63	18	113

== All time results ==
=== Championship ===
Cork win
Waterford win
Drawn game

No.	Date	Winners	Score	Runners-up	Venue	Stage
1	22 July 1888	Cork (1)	2-8 - 0-0	Waterford	Fraher Field	MSHC semi-final
2	17 August 1890	Cork (2)	w/o - scr.	Waterford	Youghal	MSHC semi-final
3	1 May 1898	Cork (3)	4-6 - 1-6	Waterford	Fraher Field	MSHC quarter-final
4	9 October 1904	Cork (4)	5-16 - 1-1	Waterford	Tipperary	MSHC final
5	12 May 1906	Cork (5)	4-13 - 0-2	Waterford	Fraher Field	MSHC quarter-final
6	19 May 1907	Cork (6)	5-13 - 4-2	Waterford	Fraher Field	MSHC semi-final
7	11 July 1909	Cork (7)	6-16 - 0-3	Waterford	Fraher Field	MSHC semi-final
8	21 June 1914	Cork (8)	4-2 - 1-1	Waterford	Walsh Park	MSHC semi-final
9	6 August 1916	Cork (9)	8-1 - 3-2	Waterford	Walsh Park	MSHC semi-final
10	18 May 1919	Cork (10)	10-1 - 3-0	Waterford	Fraher Field	MSHC quarter-final
11	24 June 1923	Cork (11)	13-4 - 0-1	Waterford	Fraher Field	MSHC quarter-final
12	4 May 1924	Cork (12)	8-3 - 3-0	Waterford	Shandon Grounds	MSHC quarter-final
13	30 May 1926	Cork (13)	12-3 - 5-2	Waterford	Fraher Field	MSHC quarter-final
14	13 May 1928	Cork (14)	4-8 - 0-3	Waterford	Gaelic Park	MSHC semi-final
15	11 August 1929	Cork (15)	4-6 - 2-3	Waterford	Fraher Field	MSHC final
16	16 August 1931	Cork	4-0 - 1-9	Waterford	Clonmel GAA Ground	MSHC final
17	30 August 1931	Cork (16)	5-4 - 2-1	Waterford	Clonmel GAA Ground	MSHC final replay
18	12 June 1932	Cork (17)	5-6 - 1-5	Waterford	FitzGerald Park	MSHC quarter-final
19	10 July 1938	Waterford (1)	5-2 - 1-3	Cork	Fraher Field	MSHC semi-final
20	25 June 1939	Cork (18)	7-4 - 4-3	Waterford	FitzGerald Park	MSHC semi-final
21	1 August 1943	Cork (19)	2-13 - 3-8	Waterford	Cork Athletic Grounds	MSHC final
22	30 June 1946	Cork (20)	3-9 - 1-6	Waterford	Clonmel GAA Ground	MSHC semi-final
23	29 June 1947	Cork (21)	3-10 - 1-5	Waterford	Clonmel GAA Ground	MSHC semi-final
24	1 August 1948	Waterford (2)	4-7 - 3-9	Cork	Thurles Sportsfield	MSHC final
25	25 June 1950	Cork (22)	1-4 - 0-5	Waterford	Thurles Sportsfield	MSHC semi-final
26	27 June 1954	Cork (23)	7-8 - 4-5	Waterford	Thurles Sportsfield	MSHC semi-final
27	10 June 1956	Cork (24)	5-9 - 2-12	Waterford	FitzGerald Park	MSHC quarter-final
28	14 July 1957	Waterford (3)	1-11 - 1-6	Cork	Thurles Sportsfield	MSHC final
29	26 July 1959	Waterford (4)	3-9 - 2-9	Cork	Thurles Sportsfield	MSHC final
30	9 July 1961	Cork (25)	5-7 - 2-7	Waterford	Thurles Sportsfield	MSHC semi-final
31	8 July 1962	Cork (26)	4-10 - 1-16	Waterford	Thurles Sportsfield	MSHC semi-final
32	28 June 1964	Cork (27)	4-10 - 5-6	Waterford	Thurles Sportsfield	MSHC semi-final
33	4 July 1965	Cork	2-6 - 2-6	Waterford	Gaelic Grounds	MSHC semi-final
34	11 July 1965	Cork (28)	1-11 - 2-5	Waterford	Gaelic Grounds	MSHC semi-final replay
35	24 July 1966	Cork (29)	4-9 - 2-9	Waterford	Gaelic Grounds	MSHC final
36	4 June 1967	Waterford (5)	3-10 - 1-8	Cork	Walsh Park	MSHC quarter-final
37	22 May 1972	Cork (30)	3-16 - 4-6	Waterford	Cork Athletic Grounds	MSHC quarter-final
38	19 May 1974	Waterford (6)	4-9 - 3-8	Cork	Walsh Park	MSHC quarter-final
39	8 June 1975	Cork (31)	4-15 - 0-6	Waterford	Walsh Park	MSHC quarter-final
40	19 June 1977	Cork (32)	4-13 - 3-11	Waterford	Semple Stadium	MSHC semi-final
41	17 June 1978	Cork (33)	3-17 - 2-8	Waterford	Semple Stadium	MSHC semi-final
42	18 July 1982	Cork (34)	5-31 - 3-6	Waterford	Semple Stadium	MSHC final
43	10 July 1983	Cork (35)	3-22 - 0-12	Waterford	Semple Stadium	MSHC final
44	8 June 1986	Cork (36)	6-13 - 0-9	Waterford	Semple Stadium	MSHC semi-final
45	4 June 1989	Cork	0-18 - 0-18	Waterford	Semple Stadium	MSHC semi-final
46	18 June 1989	Waterford (7)	5-16 - 4-17	Cork	Semple Stadium	MSHC semi-final replay
47	3 June 1990	Cork (37)	4-15 - 1-8	Waterford	Semple Stadium	MSHC semi-final
48	2 June 1991	Cork (38)	2-10 - 0-13	Waterford	Semple Stadium	MSHC semi-final
49	13 June 1999	Cork (39)	0-24 - 1-15	Waterford	Semple Stadium	MSHC semi-final
50	26 May 2002	Waterford (8)	1-16 - 1-15	Cork	Semple Stadium	MSHC semi-final
51	29 June 2003	Cork (40)	3-16 - 3-12	Waterford	Semple Stadium	MSHC final
52	27 June 2004	Waterford (9)	3-16 - 1-21	Cork	Semple Stadium	MSHC semi-final
53	22 May 2005	Cork (41)	2-17 - 2-15	Waterford	Semple Stadium	MSHC quarter-final
54	24 July 2005	Cork (42)	1-18 - 1-13	Waterford	Croke Park	AISHC quarter-final
55	6 August 2006	Cork (43)	1-16 - 1-15	Waterford	Croke Park	AISHC semi-final
56	15 June 2007	Waterford (10)	5-15 - 3-18	Cork	Semple Stadium	MSHC semi-final
57	29 July 2007	Waterford	3-16 - 3-16	Cork	Croke Park	AISHC quarter-final
58	5 August 2007	Waterford (11)	2-17 - 0-20	Cork	Croke Park	AISHC quarter-final replay
59	9 July 2010	Waterford	2-15 - 2-15	Cork	Semple Stadium	MSHC final
60	17 July 2010	Waterford (12)	1-19 - 0-19	Cork	Semple Stadium	MSHC final replay
61	29 July 2012	Cork (44)	1-19 - 0-19	Waterford	Semple Stadium	AISHC quarter-final
62	25 May 2014	Cork	1-21 - 1-21	Waterford	Semple Stadium	MSHC quarter-final
63	8 June 2014	Cork (45)	0-28 - 0-14	Waterford	Semple Stadium	MSHC quarter-final replay
64	7 June 2015	Waterford (13)	3-19 - 1-21	Cork	Semple Stadium	MSHC semi-final
65	18 June 2017	Cork (46)	0-23 - 1-15	Waterford	Semple Stadium	MSHC Semi-finals
66	13 August 2017	Waterford (14)	4-19 - 0-20	Cork	Croke Park	All-Ireland Semi-finals
67	8 June 2019	Cork (47)	2-30 - 2-17	Waterford	Páirc Uí Chaoimh	MSHC Round 4
68	17 June 2018	Cork (48)	1-23 - 1-20	Waterford	Semple Stadium	MSHC Round 5
69	31 October 2020	Waterford (15)	1-28 - 1-24	Cork	Semple Stadium	MSHC semi-final
70	15 May 2022	Cork (49)	2-22 - 1-19	Waterford	Walsh Park	MSHC Round 4
71	30 April 2023	Cork (50)	0-27 - 0-18	Waterford	Pairc Ui Chaoimh	MSHC Round 2
72	21 April 2024	Waterford (16)	2-25 - 1-25	Cork	Walsh Park	MSHC Round 1

== Records ==
=== Scorelines ===
- Biggest win:
  - For Cork: Cork 13-4 - 0-1 Waterford, Munster quarter-final, Fraher Field, 24 June 1923
  - For Waterford: Waterford 5-2 - 1-3 Cork, Munster semi-final, Fraher Field, 10 July 1938
- Highest aggregate:
  - Cork 5-31 - 3-6 Waterford, Munster final, Semple Stadium, 18 July 1982

=== Top scorers ===
Rank	Player	Team	Score	Total	Appearances
1	Christy Ring	Cork	11-37	70	1943, 1946, 1947, 1948, 1950, 1954, 1956, 1959, 1961, 1962
2	Paul Flynn	Waterford	5-44	59	1999, 2002, 2003, 2004, 2005, 2005, 2006, 2007, 2007, 2007
2	Ben O'Connor	Cork	2-53	59	1999, 2002, 2003, 2004, 2005, 2005, 2006, 2007, 2007, 2007, 2010, 2010
4	Eoin Kelly	Waterford	4-43	55	2002, 2003, 2004, 2005, 2005, 2006, 2007, 2007, 2007, 2010, 2010
5	Joe Deane	Cork	2-48	54	1999, 2002, 2003, 2004, 2005, 2005, 2006, 2007, 2007, 2007
6	Dan Shanahan	Waterford	9-12	39	1999, 2002, 2003, 2004, 2005, 2005, 2006, 2007, 2007, 2007, 2010, 2010
7	John Mullane	Waterford	4-26	38	2002, 2003, 2004, 2005, 2005, 2006, 2007, 2007, 2007, 2010, 2010, 2012
8	Charlie McCarthy	Waterford	5-22	37	1965, 1966, 1967, 1972, 1974, 1975, 1977, 1978
