= 2008 Interprovincial Hurling Championship =

- Dates: 25 October 2008 - 1 November 2008
- Teams: 4
- Sponsor: Martin Donnelly
- Champions: Leinster (26th title); Tommy Walsh (captain)
- Runners-up: Munster; Brendan Cummins (captain)

Tournament statistics
- Matches played: 3
- Goals scored: 8 (2.67 per match)
- Points scored: 74 (24.67 per match)
- Top scorer(s): Eoin Kelly (1-12)

The 2008 Interprovincial Hurling Championship was the 81st staging of the Interprovincial Championship since its establishment by the Gaelic Athletic Association in 1927. The championship began on 25 October 2008 and ended on 1 November 2008.

Munster were the defending champions.

On 1 November 2008, Leinster won the championship following a 1-15 to 1-12 defeat of Munster in the final at O'Moore Park. This was their 26th championship title overall and their first title since 2006.

Munster's Eoin Kelly was the championship's top scorer with 1-12.

== Results ==
=== Semi-finals ===
25 October 2008 Semi-final	Munster	2-14 - 1-12	Ulster	Páirc Mac Gearailt, Fermoy
	E Kelly 1-5, S Callanan 1-2, T Carmody 0-2, B O'Connell 0-2, C Naughton 0-1, P Kelly 0-1, N Gilligan 0-1.		P Braniff 0-8, S McNaughton 1-0, P Shields 0-1, K McKeegan 0-1, K Stewart 0-1, K Hinphey 0-1.	Referee: A Stapleton (Laois)

25 October 2008 Semi-final	Connacht	1-10 - 2-11	Leinster	Newpark Sportsfield, Kiltoom
	N Healy 0-5, J Gantley 1-0, D Tierney 0-2, K Burke 0-1, R Murray 0-1.	Report	R Hogan 0-7, R Power 1-2, E Coady 1-0, B Murtagh 0-2.	Referee: D O'Driscoll (Limerick)

=== Final ===
1 November 2008 Final	Leinster	1-15 - 1-12	Munster	O'Moore Park, Portlaoise
	R Power 0-09 (0-06f, 0-01 '65', 0-01 pen), R Hogan 1-01, J O'Connor, A Fogarty, E Brennan, E Larkin, M Rice 0-01 each.		E Kelly 0-07 (0-06f), A Shaughnessy 1-00, B O'Connor 0-02, N Gilligan, J Gardiner, Paul Kelly 0-01 each.	Referee: P Greene (Galway)

== Top scorers ==
Top scorers overall

Rank	Player	Club	Tally	Total	Matches	Average
1	Eoin Kelly	Munster	1-12	15	2	7.50
2	Richie Power	Leinster	1-11	14	2	7.00
3	Richie Hogan	Leinster	1-08	11	2	5.50
