= 2010 Munster Senior Hurling Championship final =

- Event: 2010 Munster Senior Hurling Championship
Waterford	Cork
2-15	2-15
- Date: 11 July 2010
- Venue: Semple Stadium, Thurles
- Man of the Match: Declan Prendergast (Waterford)
- Referee: J. Ryan (Tipperary)
- Attendance: 35,375

The 2010 Munster Senior Hurling Championship final was a hurling match played on 7 June 2010 at Semple Stadium, Thurles, County Tipperary. It was contested by Cork and Waterford. The game finished in a draw, with a scoreline of 2-15 each. The final was replayed the following Saturday night, with Waterford claiming the first Munster Championship of the decade, their ninth overall, beating Cork by three points after extra time.

== Previous Munster Final encounters ==
Previous to this encounter, the teams had met each other in twelve Munster Hurling Finals, including a replay in 1931. Cork led the rivalry, having won eight finals in comparison to Waterford's three wins. Notable finals include 1982, when Cork beat Waterford by 31 points (Munster Final record) and the previous year's final when Cork beat Waterford by 4 points, even after a hat trick of goals by Waterford's John Mullane.

Year	Venue	Cork score	Waterford score	Match report
1903	Tipperary Town	5-16 (31)	1-01 (4)	
1929	Fraher Field, Dungarvan	4-06 (18)	2-03 (9)	
1931	Clonmel	1-09 (12)	4-00 (12)	
1931	Clonmel	5-04 (19)	1-02 (5)	
1943	Cork Athletic Grounds, Cork	2-13 (19)	3-08 (17)	
1948	Semple Stadium, Thurles	3-09 (18)	4-07 (19)	
1957	Semple Stadium, Thurles	1-06 (9)	1-11 (14)	
1959	Semple Stadium, Thurles	2-09 (15)	3-09 (18)	
1966	Gaelic Grounds, Limerick	4-09 (21)	2-09 (15)	
1982	Semple Stadium, Thurles	5-31 (46)	3-06 (15)	
1983	Cork Athletic Grounds, Cork	3-22 (31)	0-12 (12)	
2003	Semple Stadium, Thurles	3-16 (25)	3-12 (21)	Irish Examiner
2004	Semple Stadium, Thurles	1-21 (24)	3-16(25)	Irish Examiner

== Drawn match ==
=== Details ===
11 July 2010
Final

Waterford	2-15 - 2-15	Cork
E. Kelly 1-8; J. Mullane 0-4; T. Browne 1-0; S. O'Sullivan 0-2; K. Moran 0-1	(Report)	B. O'Connor 1-5; A. Ó hAilpín 1-0; J. Gardiner 0-3; C. Naughton 0-2; S. Óg Ó hAilpín 0-1; T. Kenny 0-1; B. Murphy 0-1; N. McCarthy 0-1; M. Cussen 0-1

Semple Stadium, Thurles
Attendance: 35,375
Referee: J. Ryan (Tipperary)

Waterford	Cork

== Replay ==
2010 Munster Senior Hurling Championship final replay
- Event: 2010 Munster Senior Hurling Championship
Waterford	Cork
1-16	1-13
- Date: 17 July 2010
- Venue: Semple Stadium, Thurles
- Man of the Match: Michael Walsh (Waterford)
- Referee: Brian Gavin (Offaly)
- Attendance: 22,763

== Summary ==
=== Details ===
17 July 2010
Final replay

Waterford	1-16 - 1-13 AET	Cork
E Kelly 0-8, D Shanahan 1-0, J Mullane 0-3, T Browne, R Foley, K Moran, S Walsh, B O'Halloran 0-1 each	(Report)	B O'Connor 1-5, J Gardiner, C Naughton, P O'Sullivan 0-2 each, M Cussen, L McLoughlin 0-1 each

Semple Stadium, Thurles
Attendance: 22,763
Referee: Brian Gavin (Offaly)

Waterford	Cork

== See also ==
- Cork and Waterford hurling rivalry
