= Michael Walsh (Waterford hurler) =

Irish hurler and Gaelic footballer (born 1983)

Personal information
- Native name: Mícheál Breathnach (Irish)
- Nickname: Brick
- Born: 23 April 1983 (age 43) Waterford, Ireland
- Occupation: Banking official
- Height: 6 ft 0 in (183 cm)

Sport
- Sport: Hurling
- Position: Centre-forward
Club
- Years: Club
- 2000-present: Stradbally
Club titles
	Football	Hurling
Waterford titles	10	0
College
- Years: College
- 2001-2006: Waterford Institute of Technology
College titles
- Fitzgibbon titles: 3
Inter-county*
Years	County	Apps (scores)
2003-2019	Waterford	76 (3-26)
Inter-county titles
- Munster titles: 3
- All-Irelands: 0
- NHL: 2
- All Stars: 4
- *Inter County team apps and scores correct as of 15:43, 16 October 2019.

Michael "Brick" Walsh (born 23 April 1983) is an Irish hurler and Gaelic footballer who plays for Waterford Championship club Stradbally. He played for the Waterford senior hurling team for 17 seasons, during which time he lined out in a variety of positions. Often considered one of Waterford's greatest-ever players, Walsh won four All-Stars and is one of just three players to claim awards in defence, midfield and attack. He won five major trophies during his inter-county career, including three Munster Championships and two National Leagues, however, an All-Ireland Championship eluded him. Walsh holds the all-time record for championship appearances with 76.

Born and raised in Stradbally, County Waterford, Walsh began his hurling and Gaelic football career with the Stradbally club. He joined the club's senior teams as a 17-year-old dual player and enjoyed his first success, a Waterford Football Championship, in 2001 - the first of five successive championship wins. Walsh later won a further five championship titles between 2009 and 2017.

Walsh lined out for Waterford in three different grades of hurling over a 19-year period. After making his first appearance for the minor team in April 2000, he later progressed onto the under-21 team as a dual player and won a Munster Championship medal as a footballer in 2003. After one season with the Waterford senior football team in 2002, Walsh made his competitive debut for the Waterford senior hurling team aged 19 in 2003 and enjoyed his first success the following year when Waterford claimed the Munster Championship. He claimed a National League title in 2007 before also claiming a second Munster Championship title later that same season. An All-Ireland Championship runner-up in 2008, Walsh won a third Munster Championship medal in 2010 before collecting a second National League title in 2015. He was an All-Ireland Championship runner-up for the second time in his career in 2017. He announced his retirement from inter-county hurling in October 2019.

== Playing career ==
=== Waterford Institute of Technology ===
During his studies at the Waterford Institute of Technology, Walsh became a member of the college hurling team. On 1 March 2003, he was a non-playing substitute when the Waterford Institute of Technology defeated the Cork Institute of Technology by 0–13 to 1–07 to win the Fitzgibbon Cup.

Walsh broke on the starting fifteen the following year. On 6 March 2004, he was at midfield when the Waterford Institute of Technology defeated University College Cork by 0–11 to 0–09 to retain the Fitzgibbon Cup.

On 4 March 2006, Walsh was again at midfield when the Waterford Institute of Technology faced University College Dublin in the Fitzgibbon Cup final. A 4–13 to 0–08 victory secured a third winners' medal for Walsh.

=== Stradbally ===
Walsh joined the Stradbally club at a young age and played in all grades at juvenile and underage levels as a dual player of Gaelic football and hurling before eventually joining the club's top adult teams.

On 7 October 2001, Walsh was at full-forward when Stradbally drew 0-04 apiece with Rathgormack in the final of the Waterford Championship. He was again at full-forward for the replay two weeks later and scored two points in the 1–13 to 2-04 extra-time victory.

On 27 October 2002, Walsh scored 1-01 from full-forward when Stradbally drew 3–08 to 2–11 with the Nire in final of the Waterford Championship. He lined out in the same position for the replay a week later and, in spite of being held scoreless, collected a second successive winners' medal after a 0–12 to 0–10 victory.

Walsh lined out at full-forward in a third successive Waterford Championship final on 23 November 2003. He was held scoreless but collected a third winners' medal after the 1–11 to 0–08 defeat of Tramore in the final.

Stradbally's run of success continued in 2004, with Walsh lining out in a fourth successive final on 31 October. He claimed a fourth successive winners' medal after the 2–08 to 1–04 defeat of the Nire.

On 13 November 2005, Walsh was at full-forward for Stradbally's 0-06 apiece draw with the Nire in the Waterford Championship final. The replay a week later saw Stradbally defeat the Nire by 1–08 to 1-04, with Walsh collecting a fifth successive winners' medal.

Walsh was moved from full-forward to midfield for the 2006 championship. On 12 November, he lined out in that position in a sixth successive championship final. Stradbally suffered a 1–05 to 0–03 defeat.

Walsh was a regular for Stradbally throughout the 2009 Waterford Championship, however, an injury kept him out of the final against the Nire on 1 November. In spite of this he collected a sixth winners' medal as a non-playing substitute following the 2–05 to 0–09 victory.

On 17 October 2010, Walsh lined out at midfield when Stradbally qualified for the Waterford Championship final. He won a seventh championship medal following the 0–09 to 1–05 defeat of Ballinacourty.

Walsh was at midfield on 23 October 2011 when Stradbally suffered a 0–06 to 0–05 defeat by Ballinacourty in the final.

Walsh was appointed captain of the Stradbally senior team for the 2012 season. On 11 November, he won an eighth championship medal when he guided the club to a 1–08 to 0–10 defeat of the Nire in the final replay.

After losing back-to-back finals in 2013 and 2014, Stradbally reached a seventh successive final on 6 November 2015. Walsh scored a point from midfield in the 0–08 to 0–06 defeat of Ballinacourty.

On 3 December 2017, Walsh won a tenth championship medal. He scored a point from midfield in the 1–15 to 1–15 defeat of the Nire in the final.

=== Waterford ===
==== Minor and under-21 ====
Walsh first played for Waterford as a dual player at minor level. He made his first appearance as a Gaelic footballer on 11 April 2000 when he lined out at midfield in Waterford's 0–11 to 0–03 defeat by Clare in the Munster Championship.

Walsh was again eligible for the minor grade the following year and was also added to the Waterford minor hurling team for the 2001 Munster Championship. He made his only appearance on 25 April when he scored three points from midfield in a 1–15 to 0–07 defeat by Cork.

After progressing from the minor to the under-21 grade, Walsh continued his role as a dual player. On 10 July 2002, he made his first appearance for the Waterford under-21 hurling team in a 2–14 to 1–11 defeat by Tipperary in the Munster Championship.

On 3 September 2003, Walsh was at midfield for the Waterford under-21 football team that faced Kerry in the Munster Championship final. He ended the game with a winners' medal after the 2–08 to 1–09 victory.

==== Senior ====
Walsh was added to the Waterford senior football panel for the 2002 National League. He made his first appearance on 3 March when he came on as a substitute in a 3–11 to 0–06 defeat by Meath. On 12 May, Walsh made his first appearance in the Munster Championship. He scored 1-01 from the right corner-forward in a 3–10 to 2–09 defeat by Clare.

On 23 February 2003, Walsh made his first appearance for the Waterford senior hurling team when he lined out at midfield in a 4–11 to 0–12 defeat by Kilkenny in the National League. He made his first appearance in the Munster Championship on 11 May when he came on as a substitute for Tony Browne in a 2–26 to 1–12 defeat of Kerry. on 29 June, Walsh was introduced as a 67th-minute substitute for Eoin McGrath in Waterford's 3–16 to 3-12 Munster Championship final defeat by Cork.

Walsh became a regular member of the starting fifteen during the 2004 National League. On 9 May, he was at midfield when Waterford suffered a 2–15 to 1–13 defeat by Galway in the National League final. On 27 June, Walsh won a Munster Championship medal after Waterford's 3–16 to 1–21 defeat of Cork in the final.

Walsh was nominated for his first All-Star award in 2006.

Walsh was appointed captain of the Waterford team for the 2007 season. On 29 April, he captained the team to a first National Hurling League title in 43 years after a 0–20 to 0–18 defeat of Kilkenny in the final. On 8 July, Walsh captained Waterford to a Munster Championship final meeting with Limerick. He collected a second winners' medal after the 3–17 to 1–14 victory. Walsh ended the season by being named at midfield on the All-Star team.

Walsh retained the captaincy of the Waterford team for the 2008 season. On 7 September, he captained the team to an All-Ireland final meeting with Kilkenny, in what was Waterford's first appearance in a final since 1963. Kilkenny won the game by 3–30 to 1–13.

On 12 July 2009, Walsh was at centre-back for Waterford's 4–14 to 2–16 defeat by Tipperary in the Munster Championship final. He ended the season by being named in the centre-back position on the All-Star team.

On 11 July 2010, Walsh lined out at centre-back when Waterford drew 2-15 apiece with Cork in the Munster Championship final. He retained his position in defence for the subsequent replay, which saw him claim a third winners' medal after Waterford won by 1–16 to 1–13. Walsh was later named as the centre-back on the All-Star team.

Walsh was again at centre-back when Waterford lost the 2011 Munster Championship final to Tipperary by 7–19 to 0–19 on 10 July 2011.

Walsh was appointed captain of the Waterford team for the 2012 season. On 15 July, he was at centre-back when Waterford contested their fourth successive Munster Championship final, however, Waterford suffered a 2–17 to 0–16 defeat by Tipperary.

On 3 May 2015, Walsh was named at full-back but lined out at left wing-forward for the 2015 National League final against Cork. The 1–24 to 0–17 victory gave him a second National League winners' medal. On 12 July 2015, Walsh was at right wing-forward when Waterford were beaten for the fourth time in six seasons by Tipperary in the 2015 Munster Championship final.

On 1 May 2016, Walsh was at left wing-forward when Waterford drew 0-22 apiece with Clare in the National League final. He was retained in the same position for the replay, which Waterford lost by 1–23 to 2–19. On 10 July, was again at left wing-forward the Munster Championship final, with Waterford eventually losing by 5–19 to 0–13.

On 3 September 2017, Walsh lined out at full-forward when Waterford faced Galway in the All-Ireland final. He scored a point from play in the 0–26 to 2–17 defeat. Walsh ended the season by winning a fourth GAA/GPA All-Star award.

On 17 June 2018, Walsh set a new all-time championship appearance record when he lined out in his 74th championship game.

== Nickname ==
Walsh acquired the nickname "Brick" in school, and claims it does not refer to size or strength: "It certainly wasn't given to me because I was mightily strong or anything like that. It was a nickname I seemed to pick up in school and for a while people just thought it was a double-barrel family name, but it's after sticking with me now in a big way, and at this stage I just accept it."

== Career statistics ==
As of match played 8 June 2019.

Team	Year	National League			Munster		All-Ireland		Total	
Team	Year	Division	Apps	Score	Apps	Score	Apps	Score	Apps	Score
Waterford	2003	Division 1A	6	1–02	4	0–00	1	0–01	11	1–03
Waterford	2004	Division 1A	8	0–02	3	0–02	1	0–01	12	0–05
Waterford	2005	Division 1A	6	0–06	1	0–00	4	0–04	11	0–10
Waterford	2006	Division 1A	6	0–04	1	0–00	5	1–09	12	1–13
Waterford	2007	Division 1A	8	0–03	2	0–00	3	0–02	13	0–05
Waterford	2008	Division 1A	6	0–06	1	0–00	5	0–02	12	0–08
Waterford	2009	Division 1	7	0–00	3	0–00	2	0–00	12	0–00
Waterford	2010	Division 1	3	0–00	3	0–00	1	0–00	7	0–00
Waterford	2011	Division 1	7	0–00	2	0–00	2	0–00	11	0–00
Waterford	2012	Division 1A	5	0–00	2	0–00	1	0–00	8	0–00
Waterford	2013	Division 1A	5	0–00	1	0–00	3	0–00	9	0–00
Waterford	2014	Division 1A	5	0–00	2	0–00	2	0–00	9	0–00
Waterford	2015	Division 1B	8	1–09	2	0–00	2	0–00	12	1–09
Waterford	2016	Division 1A	8	0–01	2	0–00	3	0–02	13	0–03
Waterford	2017	Division 1A	5	0–00	1	0–00	5	2–03	11	2–03
Waterford	2018	Division 1A	3	0–00	4	0–00	—		7	0–00
Waterford	2019	Division 1B	7	0-00	2	0–00	—		9	0-00
Career total			103	2–33	36	0–02	40	3–24	179	5–59

== Honours ==
Waterford Institute of Technology

- Fitzgibbon Cup (3): 2003, 2004, 2006

Stradbally

- Waterford Senior Football Championship (10): 2001, 2002, 2003, 2004, 2005, 2009, 2010, 2012, 2015, 2017

Waterford

- Munster Senior Hurling Championship (3): 2004, 2007, 2010
- National Hurling League (2): 2007, 2015
- Munster Under-21 Football Championship (1): 2003

Munster

- Railway Cup (2): 2007, 2013

=== Individual ===
- All-Stars (4): 2007, 2009, 2010, 2017

Sporting positions
Preceded by Paul Flynn	Waterford Senior Hurling Captain; 2007–2008	Succeeded by Stephen Molumphy
Preceded by Stephen Molumphy	Waterford Senior Hurling Captain; 2012	Succeeded by Kevin Moran
