= 2007 Interprovincial Hurling Championship =

- Dates: 13 October 2007 - 27 October 2007
- Teams: 4
- Sponsor: Martin Donnelly
- Champions: Munster (44th title); John Mullane (captain); Michael Ryan (manager)
- Runners-up: Connacht; David Collins (captain); Ger Loughnane (manager)

Tournament statistics
- Matches played: 3
- Goals scored: 11 (3.67 per match)
- Points scored: 116 (38.67 per match)
- Top scorer(s): Eoin Kelly (1-20)

The 2007 Interprovincial Hurling Championship was the 80th staging of the Interprovincial Championship since its establishment by the Gaelic Athletic Association in 1927. The championship began on 13 October 2007 and ended on 27 October 2007.

Leinster were the defending champions, however, they were beaten by Munster in the semi-final.

On 27 October 2007, Munster won the championship following a 2–22 to 2–19 defeat of Connacht in the final at Croke Park. This was their 44th championship title overall and their first title since 2005.

Munster's Eoin Kelly was the championship's top scorer with 1-20.

== Teams ==
Province	Manager(s)	Captain(s)
Connacht	Ger Loughnane	David Collins
Leinster	John Conran	James McGarry
Munster	Michael Ryan	Michael Walsh; John Mullane
Ulster	Terence McNaughton; Dominic McKinley	Seán Delargy

== Results ==
=== Semi-finals ===
13 October 2007 Semi-final	Munster	1-21 - 1-13	Leinster	Páirc Mac Gearailt, Fermoy
	E Kelly (1-10, 0-6 frees); J Gardiner (0-2, one free, one 65), M Walsh (0-2), L Corbett (0-2), M Fitzgerald (0-1), J Mullane (0-1), S O'Connor (0-1), S McGrath (0-1), J Clancy (0-1).	Report	J Young (0-5, four frees), R McCarthy (1-0), M Rice (0-2); D Lyng (0-2), K Brady (0-1), B Lambert (0-1), R Power (0-1), A Fogarty (0-1).	Referee: M Haverty (Galway)

20 October 2007 Semi-final	Ulster	4-13 - 1-28	Connacht	MacCumhaill Park, Ballybofey
	K Kelly 3-0, P McCormack 0-6 (0-4f), D Coulter 0-4, N McManus 1-0, K McKeegan (0-1 '65'), S McCorry, E McCloskey 0-1 each.	Report	N Healy 0-10 (0-5f, 0-1 '65'), S Glynn 0-7, A Callanan 1-3, I Tannian 0-3, A Kerins 0-2, F Healy, K Burke, K Hynes 0-1 each.	Referee: J McGrath (Westmeath)

=== Final ===
27 October 2007 Final	Munster	2-22 - 2-19	Connacht	Croke Park, Dublin
	E Kelly 0-10 (0-6f), J Mullane 1-2, J Gardiner 0-4 (0-2f, 1 '65'), D O'Grady 0-3, L Corbett 0-2, G Quinn 0-1.		N Healy 0-11 (0-8f), A Callanan 1-3, D Hayes 0-3, A Kerins 1-0, C Dervan 0-2 (0-2f).	Attendance: 10,127; Referee: D Magee (Down)

== Top scorers ==
Top scorers overall

Rank	Player	Club	Tally	Total	Matches	Average
1	Eoin Kelly	Munster	1-20	23	2	11.50
2	Niall Healy	Connacht	0-21	21	2	10.50
3	Aonghus Callanan	Connacht	2-06	12	2	6.00
