= John Gardiner (hurler) =

Irish retired hurler (born 1983)

Personal information
- Native name: Seán Ó Gairnéir (Irish)
- Nickname: Gar
- Born: 8 February 1983 (age 43) Farranree, Cork, Ireland
- Occupation: Commercial finance lead
- Height: 6 ft 1 in (185 cm)

Sport
- Sport: Hurling
- Position: Right wing-back
Club
- Years: Club
- 2000-2016: Na Piarsaigh
Club titles
- Cork titles: 1
College
- Years: College
- 2001-2005: Cork Institute of Technology
College titles
- Fitzgibbon titles: 0
Inter-county*
Years	County	Apps (scores)
2002–2012	Cork	47 (1–52)
Inter-county titles
- Munster titles: 3
- All-Irelands: 2
- NHL: 0
- All Stars: 1
- *Inter County team apps and scores correct as of 22:36, 7 November 2012.

John Gardiner (born 8 February 1983) is an Irish retired hurler who played for Cork Senior Championship club Na Piarsaigh. He played for the Cork senior hurling team for 11 seasons, during which time he usually lined out as a right wing-back. A commanding and combative defender, Gardiner was part of a dominant half-back line that also included Seán Óg Ó hAilpín and Ronan Curran.

Gardiner began his hurling career at club level with Na Piarsaigh. He eventually broke onto the club's senior team and enjoyed his greatest success when Na Piarsaigh won the 2004 Cork Senior Championship.

At inter-county level, Gardiner was part of the successful Cork minor team that won the All-Ireland Championship in 2001 before later lining out with the under-21 team for three seasons. He joined the Cork senior team in 2002. From his debut, Gardiner was ever-present as a defender and made a combined total of 104 National League and Championship appearances in a career that ended with his last game in 2004 and 2005. Gardiner also secured three Munster Championship medals. He retired from inter-county hurling after being released from the Cork panel in November 2012.

Gardiner won his only All-Star in 2005 while he was also selected as Hurler of the Year by his peers in the Gaelic Players Association. At inter-provincial level, he was selected to play in six championship campaigns with Munster and claimed Railway Cup medals as captain in 2005 and 2007.

== Biography ==
John Gardiner was born in Farranree on the north side of Cork City in 1983. He was educated at Scoil Isogain before later attending St. Finbarr's College, a hurling nursery for local talent. It was here that Gardiner first tasted success as he became a key member of many of the school's victorious hurling and Gaelic football teams. He later studied at the Cork Institute of Technology and worked as an official with the Ulster Bank from 2007 but later moved to J.P. Morgan.

== Playing career ==
=== Club ===
Gardiner plays his club hurling and Gaelic football with his local club called Na Piarsaigh and has enjoyed much success.

After enjoying little success in the minor and under-21 grades, he subsequently joined the Na Piarsaigh senior hurling team and became a key fixture at left wing-back. In 2004 he lined out in the final of the county senior championship with Cloyne providing the opposition. A 0–17 to 0–10 score line gave Na Piarsaigh the victory and gave Gardiner a county senior championship winners' medal.

=== Minor and under-21 ===
Gardiner first came to prominence on the inter-county scene as a dual player at minor level with Cork in 2000. That year he lined out in his first Munster hurling final in the under-18 grade. Limerick provided the opposition on that occasion, however, they were no match for 'the Rebels'. A 2–19 to 1–10 trouncing gave Cork the victory and gave Gardiner a Munster medal.

In 2001 Gardiner was still a key member of the Cork minor hurling team. They surrendered their Munster title to Tipperary following a conclusive 1–13 to 1–6 defeat. Cork, however, still had a chance to claim the All-Ireland title via the 'back door'. After coming through the All-Ireland series Gardiner's side reached the championship decider. For the second year in succession Galway were the opponents. Gardiner produced a fantastic exhibition of hurling in that game as Cork went on to win by 2–10 to 1–8, giving him an All-Ireland Minor Hurling Championship medal.

Gardiner later joined the Cork under-21 hurling team, however, he enjoyed little success in this grade.

=== Senior ===
Gardiner's performances in the minor grade brought him to the attentions of the Cork senior selectors. He made his debut in a National Hurling League game against Derry in 2002, and subsequently lined out in the final. Kilkenny were the winners on that occasion on a score line of 2–15 to 2–14. Gardiner later made his championship debut in a one-point defeat of Limerick.

While the Cork hurling team should have gone from strength to strength as a result of a solid foundation at minor and under-21 levels the opposite happened. A series of embarrassing defeats saw the Cork hurling team reach rock bottom and call a players' strike just before Christmas in 2002. Had the strike failed it could have meant the end of his and his teammates' careers, however, in the end the county board relented and met the demands. Although still amateur sportsmen the Cork senior hurling team were treated as professional athletes.

In 2003 Cork's players were vindicated in taking a stand as the team reached the Munster final for the first time in three years. Waterford provided the opposition on that occasion and one of hurling's modern rivalries began in earnest. An exciting game resulted between the two teams; however, victory went to Cork by 3–16 to 3–12. It was Gardiner's first Munster medal. Cork subsequently qualified for an All-Ireland final meeting with Kilkenny. In another thrilling game of hurling both teams were level for much of the game, exchanging tit-for-tat scores. A Martin Comerford goal five minutes from the end settled the game as Kilkenny went on to win by 1–14 to 1–11.

2004 saw Cork reach the Munster final once again and, for the second consecutive year, Waterford provided the opposition. In what many consider to be the greatest provincial championship decider of them all, both sides fought tooth-and-nail for the full seventy minutes. Unfortunately for Gardiner Cork lost the game by just a single point on a score line of 3–16 to 1–21. Although Cork surrendered their provincial crown they were still in with a chance of landing the All-Ireland title. After manoeuvering through the qualifiers Cork reached a second consecutive All-Ireland final and, once again, Kilkenny provided the opposition. The game was expected to be another classic; however, a damp day put an end to this. The first half was a low-scoring affair and provided little excitement for fans. The second-half saw Cork completely take over. For the last twenty-three minutes Cork scored nine unanswered points and went on to win the game by 0–17 to 0–9. It was Gardiner's first All-Ireland medal.

In 2005 Cork were on form again with Gardiner enjoying his best season in the Cork colours. The team won back the provincial crown that year with a 1–21 to 1–16 victory over Tipperary. It was Gardiner's second Munster medal as Cork went on the march for glory once again. The subsequent All-Ireland final saw Galway provide the opposition. Neither side broke away into a considerable lead, however, at the final whistle Cork were ahead by 1–21 to 1–16. For the second year in-a-row Cork were the champions and Gardiner collected his second All-Ireland medal. He was later honoured by being presented with his first All-Star award while also being named GPA Hurler of the Year.

2006 saw Cork turn their attentions to a first three-in-a-row of All-Ireland titles since 1978. The provincial decider saw Cork take on Tipperary for the second consecutive year. Once again Cork's stalwarts stood up and contributed greatly to Cork's 2–11 to 1–11 victory over their old rivals. Subsequent one-point victories over Limerick and Waterford saw Cork qualify for their fourth consecutive All-Ireland final and for the third time Kilkenny were the opponents. Like previous encounters neither side took a considerable lead, however, Kilkenny had a vital goal from Aidan Fogarty. Cork were in arrears coming into the final few minutes, however, Ben O'Connor goaled for Cork. It was too little too late as 'the Cats' denied 'the Rebels' the three-in-a-row on a score line of 1–16 to 1–13.

After a disappointing season in 2007, Gardiner was appointed captain of the Cork team for 2008. Cork exited the championship at the hands of Kilkenny that year in the All-Ireland semi-final

Following the defeat by Kilkenny in 2008 manager Gerald McCarthy's two-year contract came to an end. He was later re-appointed for a further two-year term by the Cork County Board, in spite of the majority of the players not wanting him to stay on. The players on the 2008 panel, with Gardiner as one of the most vocal leaders of the strike, refused to play or train under McCarthy. (see 2008-2009 Cork players strike). McCarthy accordingly began the 2009 National League campaign with a new squad, none of whom had been able to make the previous year's panel. After months of pressure McCarthy eventually stepped down as manager.

Gardiner remained as team captain for 2009, however, Cork hurling went into decline with the team falling short in the championship for a number of seasons.

In November 2012 Gardiner was dropped from the Cork senior hurling panel.

=== Inter-provincial ===
Gardiner has also lined out with Munster in the Railway Cup inter-provincial competition. He captured a winners' medal in this competition as captain of the side in 2005 as Munster defeated Leinster. Gardiner won a second Railway Cup title in 2007 as Munster defeated Connacht under floodlights at Croke Park.

== Career statistics ==
Team	Year	National League			Munster		All-Ireland		Total	
Team	Year	Division	Apps	Score	Apps	Score	Apps	Score	Apps	Score
Cork	2002	Division 1B	2	0-03	0	0-00	2	0-03	4	0-06
Cork	2003	Division 1B	7	0-21	2	0-05	3	0-07	12	0-33
Cork	2004	Division 1B	6	0-10	3	1-01	3	0-02	12	1-13
Cork	2005	Division 1B	4	0-02	2	0-00	3	0-06	9	0-08
Cork	2006	Division 1A	5	0-05	2	0-02	3	0-01	10	0-08
Cork	2007	Division 1A	5	0-03	2	0-01	5	0-00	12	0-04
Cork	2008	Division 1A	5	0-14	1	0-00	4	0-04	10	0-18
Cork	2009	Division 1	3	0-01	1	0-03	1	0-01	5	0-05
Cork	2010	Division 1	7	0-21	4	0-09	2	0-05	13	0-35
Cork	2011	Division 1	6	0-08	1	0-01	2	0-01	9	0-10
Cork	2012	Division 1A	7	0-03	0	0-00	1	0-00	8	0-03
Career total			57	0-91	18	1-22	29	0-30	104	1-143

== Honours ==
St Finbarr's College

- Simcox Cup: 2000
- Dr O'Callaghan Cup: 2000, 2001

Na Piarsaigh

- Cork Senior Hurling Championship: 2004
- Cork Senior Football League: 2003
- Cork Senior Hurling League: 2013

Cork

- All-Ireland Senior Hurling Championship: 2004, 2005
- Munster Senior Hurling Championship: 2003, 2005, 2006
- All-Ireland Minor Hurling Championship: 2001
- All-Ireland Minor Football Championship: 2000
- Munster Minor Hurling Championship: 2000
- Munster Minor Football Championship: 2000

Munster

- Railway Cup: 2005 (c), 2007

Sporting positions
Preceded by Joe Deane	Cork Senior Hurling Captain; 2008–2009	Succeeded by Kieran Murphy
Awards
Preceded by Seán Óg Ó hAilpín (Cork)	Gaelic Players' Association; Hurler of the Year; 2005	Succeeded by Henry Shefflin (Kilkenny)
Achievements
Preceded by Ollie Fahy (Connacht)	Inter-provincial Hurling Final winning captain 2005	Succeeded by Eddie Brennan (Leinster)
