= Ian O'Regan =

Irish hurler from Waterford

Personal information
- Native name: Iain Ó Riagáin (Irish)
- Nickname: Iggy
- Born: 25 June 1983 (age 43) Waterford, Ireland
- Height: 6 ft 0 in (183 cm)

Sport
- Sport: Hurling
- Position: Goalkeeper
Club
- Years: Club
- 2002-present: Mount Sion
Club titles
- Waterford titles: 4
- Munster titles: 1
Inter-county
- Years: County
- 2004-2018: Waterford
Inter-county titles
- Munster titles: 3
- All-Irelands: 0
- NHL: 2
- All Stars: 0

Ian O'Regan (born 25 June 1983) is an Irish goalkeeping coach and hurler who plays for Waterford Senior Championship club Mount Sion. He played for the Waterford senior hurling team for 15 seasons, during which time he usually lined out as a goalkeeper.

O'Regan began his hurling career at club level with Mount Sion. He broke onto the club's senior team straight out of the minor grade and enjoyed his greatest success as goalkeeper on Mount Sion's Munster Championship-winning team in 2002. O'Regan has also won four Waterford Senior Championship titles.

At inter-county level, O'Regan was part of the Waterford minor team in 2001 before enjoying two seasons with the Waterford under-21 team. He joined the Waterford senior team in 2004. From his debut, O'Regan was best known as sub-goalkeeper, however, he made a number of National League and Championship appearances in a career that ended with his last game in 2018. During that time he was part of two Munster Championship-winning teams – in 2004, and 2010. O'Regan also secured one National Hurling League medal and was an All-Ireland Championship runner-up on two occasions. He announced his retirement from inter-county hurling on 10 October 2018.

== Honours ==
Mount Sion

- Munster Senior Club Hurling Championship (1): 2002
- Waterford Senior Hurling Championship (5):2000, 2002, 2003, 2004, 2006
- Waterford Minor Hurling Championship (1): 2000

Waterford

- Munster Senior Hurling Championship (2): 2004, 2010
- National Hurling League (1):, 2015
