= 2010 All-Ireland Senior Hurling Championship =

Championship details
- Dates: 22 May – 5 September 2010
- Teams: 13

All-Ireland champions
- Winning team: Tipperary (26th win)
- Captain: Eoin Kelly
- Manager: Liam Sheedy

All-Ireland Finalists
- Losing team: Kilkenny
- Captain: T. J. Reid
- Manager: Brian Cody

Provincial champions
- Munster: Waterford
- Leinster: Kilkenny
- Ulster: Antrim
- Connacht: Not Played

Championship statistics
- No. matches played: 25
- Goals total: 72 (2.88 per game)
- Points total: 851 (34.04 per game)
- Top Scorer: Eoin Kelly (3–44)
- Player of the Year: Lar Corbett
- All-Star Team: See here

The 2010 All-Ireland Senior Hurling Championship was the 114th staging of Ireland's premier hurling competition since its establishment by the Gaelic Athletic Association in 1887. A total of thirteen teams competed in the championship, with Tipperary unseating the four-time defending champions Kilkenny by 4–17 to 1–18 in the final at Croke Park, Dublin. The championship began on 22 May 2010 and concluded on 5 September 2010.

== Pre-championship ==
The build-up to the opening of the championship was dominated by Kilkenny and the 'drive for five'. 'The Cats' were installed as the bookies' favourites to retain the All-Ireland title for an unprecedented fifth successive occasion. In 2007, they surpassed Cork, while in 2009 the team equalled the seemingly unbeatable record of four All-Ireland titles in-a-row. Winning an elusive five-in-a-row would close the argument.

Tipperary were regarded as the primary challengers to Kilkenny's dominance. Many believed that they had the beating of Kilkenny in the previous year's All-Ireland final, however, 'the Cats' pulled away in the last ten minutes to seal the victory. With an extra year of experience many felt that Tipp may finally triumph for the first time in nine years.

A second tier of teams waited just behind the two clear front-runners. Galway entered the championship as the newly crowned National Hurling League champions and were also seen as a stumbling block on Kilkenny's march to immortality. The westerners were regarded as potential Leinster and maybe even All-Ireland finalists. Cork were buoyed by some impressive displays in the National League. 'The Rebels' defeated both Kilkenny and Tipperary in the group stages and finished the campaign as runners-up. Similarly, Cork enjoyed a trouble-free winter and would enter the championship without any off-field controversy. Waterford were also viewed as a team that had the potential to make life difficult for any of the other top-tier teams.

Limerick entered the championship in the midst of a crisis. After team manager Justin McCarthy dropped twelve players from the panel in October 2009, many of the remaining players decided to withdraw their services over the course of the next few months. The crisis developed into something of a 'civil war' with the vast majority of the 2009 panel remaining 'on strike', while McCarthy was retained as manager and developed a new panel of players for 2010. The result was Limerick losing all of their National League matches and being relegated to Division 2.

== Team changes ==
=== To Championship ===
Promoted from the Christy Ring Cup

- Carlow

=== From Championship ===
Relegated to the Christy Ring Cup

- None

== Teams ==
=== General information ===
Thirteen counties will compete in the All-Ireland Senior Hurling Championship: eight teams in the Leinster Senior Hurling Championship and five teams in the Munster Senior Hurling Championship.

County	Last provincial title	Last championship title	Position in 2009 Championship	Appearance
Antrim	2009	—		
Carlow	—	—		
Clare	1998	1997		
Cork	2006	2005		
Dublin	1961	1938		
Galway	1999	1988		
Kilkenny	2009	2009		
Laois	1949	1915		
Limerick	1996	1973		
Offaly	1995	1998		
Tipperary	2009	2001		
Waterford	2007	1959		
Wexford	2004	1996		

=== Personal and kits ===
Team	Colours	Sponsor	Home stadium	Captain	Manager						
Team	Colours	Sponsor	Home stadium	Captain	Manager	Antrim	Saffron and white	Creagh Concrete	Casement Park	Paul Shields	Dinny Cahill
Carlow	Red, green and yellow	Stone Developments	Dr Cullen Park	Edward Coady	Kevin Ryan						
Clare	Saffron and blue	Pat O'Donnell	Cusack Park	Brian O'Connell	Ger O'Loughlin						
Cork	Red and white	O2	Páirc Uí Chaoimh	Kieran 'Fraggy' Murphy	Denis Walsh						
Dublin	Navy and blue	Vodafone	Parnell Park	Stephen Hiney	Anthony Daly						
Galway	Maroon and white	Supermacs	Pearse Stadium	Shane Kavanagh	John McIntyre						
Kilkenny	Black and amber	Glanbia	Nowlan Park	T. J. Reid	Brian Cody						
Laois	Blue and white	MW Hire Services	O'Moore Park	Brian Campion	Niall Rigney						
Limerick	Green and white	Sporting Limerick	Gaelic Grounds	Gavin O'Mahony	Dónal O'Grady						
Offaly	Green, white and gold	Carroll Cuisine	O'Connor Park	Brian Carroll	Joe Dooley						
Tipperary	Blue and gold	Enfer	Semple Stadium	Eoin Kelly	Liam Sheedy						
Waterford	White and blue	3	Walsh Park	Stephen Molumphy	Davy FitzGerald						
Wexford	Purple and yellow	Sports Savers	Wexford Park	Diarmuid Lyng	Colm Bonnar						

== Format ==
=== Format ===
The 2010 All-Ireland Senior Hurling Championship was run on a provincial basis as usual. It was a knockout tournament with pairings drawn at random in the respective provinces – there were no seeds.

Each match was played as a single leg. If a match was drawn there was a replay. If that match ended in a draw a period of extra time was played, however, if both sides were still level at the end of extra time another replay would take place.

Munster Championship

Quarter-final: (1 match) This is a single match between the first two teams drawn from the province of Munster.

Semi-finals: (2 matches) The winner of the lone quarter-final joins the other three Munster teams to make up the semi-final pairings.

Final: (1 match) The winners of the two semi-finals contest this game.

Leinster Championship

First Round: (1 match) This was a single match between the first two teams drawn from the province of Leinster.

Quarter-finals: (3 matches) The winner of the first-round game joins five other Leinster teams to make up the three quarter-final pairings.

Semi-finals: (2 matches) The winners of the three quarter-finals join Kilkenny, who received a bye to this stage, to make up the semi-final pairings.

Final: (1 match) The winner of the two semi-finals contest this game.

Qualifiers

The qualifiers gave teams defeated in the provincial championships another chance at winning the All-Ireland.

Preliminary Round (1 match): the five teams who fail to reach a provincial semi-final will enter the qualifiers at this stage. The first two teams drawn will play each other in the preliminary round with the winner of that match joining the other three teams in Phase 1.

Phase 1: (2 matches) The winner of the preliminary round and the other three remaining teams will play off. The two winners enter Phase 3.

Phase 2: (2 matches) The two beaten Leinster semi-finalists will play the two beaten Munster semi-finalists. The two winners enter Phase 3.

Phase 3: (2 matches) The four winners of Phase 1 and Phase 2 games meet in Phase 3. The two winners advance to the All-Ireland quarter-finals.

All-Ireland Series

Quarter-finals: (2 matches) The beaten Munster and Leinster finalists will play the winners of the Phase 3 qualifiers.

Semi-finals: (2 matches) The Munster and Leinster champions will play the winners of the quarter-finals.

Final: (1 match) The two semi-final winners will contest the final.

== Provincial championships ==
=== Leinster Senior Hurling Championship ===
First round
Carlow	0–10
Laois	1–13

Quarter-finals
Wexford	1–14
Galway	2–22
Antrim	3–16
Offaly	2–26
Dublin	0–25
Laois	0–16

Semi-finals
Galway	3–16
Offaly	2–18
Dublin	0–12
Kilkenny	4–19

Leinster final
Galway	1–12
Kilkenny	1–19

22 May 2010
First Round

Carlow	0–10 – 1–13	Laois
D Murphy 0–4, C Doyle 0–3, P Kehoe 0–2, D Byrne 0–1	Report	J Fitzpatrick 1–3, M Whelan 0–4, T Fitzgerald 0–3, J Walsh, E Costelloe, J Brophy 0–1 each

O'Moore Park, Portlaoise
Referee: J. McGrath (Westmeath)

29 May 2010
Quarter-final

Wexford	1–14 – 2–22	Galway
D Lyng 0–11, T Waters 1–0, H Kehoe, R Jacob, E Quigley 0–1 each	Report	G Farragher 0–13, J Canning 1–3, K Hynes 1–0, D Hayes 0–2, D Burke, A Smyth, A Harte, A Callanan 0–1 each

Nowlan Park, Kilkenny
Attendance: 7,877
Referee: J. Sexton (Cork)

30 May 2010
Quarter-final

Antrim	3–16 – 2–26 AET	Offaly
N McManus 1–4, S McNaughton 0–5, K McKeegan, C McFall 1–0 each, J Campbell, K Stewart 0–2 each, K McGourty, N McAuley, B McFall 0–1 each	Report	S Dooley 1–10, R Hanniffy 1–1, K Brady, B Carroll, J. Bergin 0–3 each, O Kealey 0–2, D Molloy, G Healion, C Parlon, D Hayden 0–1 each

Parnell Park, Dublin
Attendance: 3,500
Referee: A. Stapleton (Laois)

6 June 2010
Quarter-final

Dublin	0–25 – 0–16	Laois
A McCrabbe, S Durkin 0–5 each, L Rushe 0–4, J McCaffrey, P Kelly 0–3 each, P Ryan, S Lambert 0–2 each, L Ryan 0–1	Report	W Hyland 0–6, J Brophy 0–3, Z Keenan 0–2, James Walsh, T Fitzgerald, M Whelan, C Delaney, J Purcell 0–1 each

Nowlan Park, Kilkenny
Attendance: 3,861
Referee: C. McAllister (Cork)

20 June 2010
Semi-final

Galway	2–19 – 3–16	Offaly
G Farragher, J Canning 1–5 each, D Burke, I Tannian, D Hayes 0–2 each, T Óg Regan, A Callanan, N Healy 0–1 each	Report	S Dooley 1–7, J Bergin 1–2, J Brady 1–1, D Hayden, B Carroll 0–2 each, R Hanniffy, D Molloy 0–1 each

Croke Park, Dublin
Attendance: 25,260
Referee: J. Ryan (Tipperary)

20 June 2010
Semi-final

Dublin	0–12 – 4–19	Kilkenny
A McCrabbe 0–6, P Kelly 0–2, J Boland, M O'Brien, J McCaffrey, D O'Callaghan 0–1 each	Report	H Shefflin 0–12, A Fogarty 2–0, E Brennan 1–1, R Power 1–0, M Rice, TJ Reid 0–2 each, M Comerford, R Hogan 0–1 each

Croke Park, Dublin
Attendance: 25,260
Referee: D. Kirwan (Cork)

26 June 2010
Semi-final Replay

Galway	3–17 – 2–18	Offaly
D Hayes 2–3, G Farragher 0–6, J Canning 1–3, I Tannian 0–2, A Callanan, A Smith, D Barry 0–1 each	Report	S Dooley 0–10, J Bergin, G Healion 1–1 each, B Carroll 0–3, B Murphy 0–2, D Kenny 0–1

O'Moore Park, Portlaoise
Referee: C. McAllister (Cork)

4 July 2010
Final

Galway	1–12 – 1–19	Kilkenny
G Farragher 0–4, D Hayes 1–1, J Canning 0–2, A Harte, I Tannian, C Donnellan, K Hynes, E Lynch 0–1 each	Report	H Shefflin 1–7, TJ Reid, R Power 0–3 each, M Rice 0–2, E Brennan, E Larkin, A Fogarty, R Hogan 0–1 each

Croke Park, Dublin
Attendance: 31,376
Referee: M. Wadding (Waterford)

=== Munster Senior Hurling Championship ===
Quarter-finals
Cork	3–15
Tipperary	0–14

Semi-finals
Clare	1–15
Waterford	0–22
Limerick	0–12
Cork	2–19

Munster final
Waterford	1–16
Cork	1–13

30 May 2010
Quarter-final

Cork	3–15 – 0–14	Tipperary
P Horgan 2–2, B O'Connor 0–5, A Ó hAilpín 1–1, J Gardiner, C Naughton, N McCarthy 0–2 each, P O'Sullivan 0–1	Report	E Kelly 0–7, J O'Brien, L Corbett 0–2 each, B Maher, S Callanan, T Hammersley 0–1 each

Páirc Uí Chaoimh, Cork
Attendance: 36,827
Referee: B. Kelly (Westmeath)

7 June 2010
Semi-final

Clare	1–15 – 0–22	Waterford
D Honan 1–3, N O'Connell, J Clancy 0–3 each, S Collins 0–2, J Conlon, C Ryan, C O'Donovan, D Barrett 0–1 each	Report	E Kelly 0–6, S Molumphy, D Prendergast, J Mullane 0–3 each, M Shanahan, S Prendergast, K Moran 0–2 each, K McGrath 0–1

Semple Stadium, Thurles
Attendance: 11,027
Referee: B. Gavin (Offaly)

20 June 2010
Semi-final

Limerick	0–12 – 2–19	Cork
T O'Brien 0–6, G Mulcahy 0–3, A Brennan, P McNamara, A Owens 0–1 each	Report	P Horgan 1–2, N McCarthy 0–5, P O'Sullivan 1–1, B O'Connor, J O'Connor 0–3 each, K Murphy 0–2, J Gardiner, L McLoughlin, C Naughton 0–1 each

Páirc Uí Chaoimh, Cork
Attendance: 13,638
Referee: J. Owens (Wexford)

11 July 2010
Final

Waterford	2–15 – 2–15	Cork
E Kelly 1–8, J Mullane 0–4, T Browne 1–0, S O'Sullivan 0–2, K Moran 0–1	Report	B O'Connor 1–5, A Ó hAilpín 1–0, J Gardiner 0–3, C Naughton 0–2, S Óg Ó hAilpín, T Kenny, B Murphy, N McCarthy, M Cussen 0–1 each

Semple Stadium, Thurles
Attendance: 35,375
Referee: J. Ryan (Tipperary)

17 July 2010
Final Replay

Waterford	1–16 – 1–13 AET	Cork
E Kelly 0–8, D Shanahan 1–0, J Mullane 0–3, T Browne, R Foley, K Moran, S Walsh, B O'Halloran 0–1 each	Report	B O'Connor 1–5, J Gardiner, C Naughton, P O'Sullivan 0–2 each, M Cussen, L McLoughlin 0–1 each

Semple Stadium, Thurles
Attendance: 22,763
Referee: B. Gavin (Offaly)

=== Ulster Senior Hurling Championship ===
First round
Armagh	3–23
Donegal	1–13
Tyrone	6–24
Cavan	1–14
Fermanagh	2–10
Monaghan	1–15

Second round
Armagh	3–20
Tyrone	2–09
London	3–16
Monaghan	1–15

Quarter-finals
Armagh	0–09
Down	4–24
London	2–12
Derry	0–15

Semi-finals
London	scr.
Down	w/o

Final
Antrim	4–22
Down	1–12

== Cup competitions ==
=== Christy Ring Cup (Tier 2) ===
==== Bracket ====
Round 1 Round 2B
Kildare	2–18
Meath	1–10
Wicklow	1–19
Mayo	2–12
Mayo	2–12
Down	3–19
Derry	0–15
Meath	2–16
Down	1–19
Kerry	0–27
Westmeath	5–15
Derry	3–16

Round 2A; Quarter-finals
Kildare	1–19
Wicklow	1–16
Westmeath	2–21
Down	1–18
Meath	1–18
Wicklow	3–13
Kerry	3–14
Westmeath	2–11

Semi-finals
Kildare	0–18
Westmeath	3–19
Wicklow	2–14
Kerry	2–17

Final
Westmeath	2–16
Kerry	1–18
Relegation Playoff
Derry
Mayo

=== Lory Meagher Cup (Tier 4) ===
==== Bracket ====
Round 1 Round 2B
South Down	1–12
Leitrim	1–13
South Down	1–13
Longford	5–13
Donegal	3–13
Longford	1–15
Warwickshire	2–17
Fermanagh	1–08

Round 2A; Quarter-finals
Cavan	1–14
Leitrim	2–14
Warwickshire	2–12
Longford	2–22
Fermanagh	0–19
Cavan	1–07
Donegal	0–21
Warwickshire	2–09

Semi-finals
Leitrim	0–10
Longford	2–21
Fermanagh	1–11
Donegal	1–22

Final
Longford	1–20
Donegal	1–12

== All-Ireland Qualifiers ==
Preliminary round
Carlow	1–19
Laois	3–12

Phase 1 / Phase 2
Antrim	2–18
Carlow	3–12
Dublin	2–22
Clare	0–15
Offaly	1–19
Limerick	1–13
Tipperary	3–24
Wexford	0–19

Phase 3
Antrim	1–17
Dublin	0–19
Offaly	1–12
Tipperary	0–21

Quarter-finalists
Antrim
Tipperary

=== Preliminary round ===
26 June 2010
Preliminary round

Carlow	1–19 – 3–12	Laois
P Kehoe 0–11, D Murphy 1–4, C Doyle 0–3, E Nolan 0–1	Report	T Fitzgerald, J Purcell 1–1 each, J Walsh, W Hyland 0–3 each, E Costelloe 1–0, J Fitzpatrick, Z Keenan 0–2 each

Dr Cullen Park, Carlow
Referee: M. Wadding (Waterford)

=== Phase 1 ===
3 July 2010
Phase 1

Antrim	2–18 – 3–12	Carlow
N McManus 0–5, K McKeegan 0–4, L Watson 1–1, K Stewart, S McNaughton 0–3 each, PJ O'Connell 1–0, E McCloskey, S McCrory 0–1 each	Report	C Doyle 2–3, P Kehoe 1–6, J Rogers, HP O'Byrne, M Brennan 0–1 each

Casement Park, Belfast
Referee: A. Stapleton (Laois)

3 July 2010
Phase 1

Tipperary	3–24 – 0–19	Wexford
L Corbett 2–3, E Kelly 0–8, G Ryan 0–4, D Egan 1–0, D Young, N McGrath 0–3 each, P Maher 0–2, S Callanan 0–1	Report	H Kehoe, R Jacob, J Berry, C Farrell 0–3 each, P Atkinson, S Banville, T Mahon 0–2 each, D Stamp 0–1

Semple Stadium, Thurles
Referee: J McGrath (Westmeath)

=== Phase 2 ===
10 July 2010
Phase 2

Offaly	1–19 – 1–13	Limerick
C Parlon, S Dooley 0–5 each, D Molloy 1–2, B Carroll 0–3, B Murphy 0–2, J Brady, J Bergin 0–1 each	Report	T O'Brien 1–7, JV O'Brien 0–2, N Quaid, G Mulcahy, C Mullane, P Russell 0–1 each

O'Connor Park, Tullamore
Referee: J. Owens (Wexford)

10 July 2010
Phase 2

Dublin	2–22 – 0–15	Clare
A McCrabbe 0–8, D O'Callaghan 0–6, P Kelly, S Lambert 1–1 each, S Hiney 0–2, S Durkin, M O'Brien, L Rushe, D O'Dwyer 0–1 each	Report	J Conlon, C Ryan 0–3 each, N O'Connell, J Clancy, F Lynch 0–2 each, B Bugler, D Honan, S Collins 0–1 each

Croke Park, Dublin
Referee: J. Sexton (Cork)

=== Phase 3 ===
17 July 2010
Phase 3

Antrim	1–17 – 0–19	Dublin
N McManus 0–8, PJ O'Connell 1–1, S McNaughton, L Watson, K McKeegan 0–2 each, S Delargy, K Stewart 0–1 each	Report	A McCrabbe 0–9, S Lambert, P Carton 0–3 each, J Boland, L Rushe, D O'Callaghan, P Ryan 0–1 each

Croke Park, Dublin
Referee: D. Kirwan (Cork)

18 July 2010
Phase 3

Offaly	1–12 – 0–21	Tipperary
S Dooley 1–7, J Bergin 0–3, D Molloy, D Hayden 0–1 each	Report	E Kelly 0–11, G Ryan 0–3, L Corbett, B Maher 0–2 each, C O'Mahony, S McGrath, N McGrath 0–1 each

O'Moore Park, Portlaoise
Referee: J. Sexton (Cork)

== All-Ireland Senior Hurling Championship ==
=== Bracket ===
Teams in bold advanced to the next round. The provincial champions are marked by an asterisk.

Quarter-finals
**Cork**	**1–25**
Antrim*	0–19
Galway	3–16
**Tipperary**	**3–17**

Semi-finals
**Kilkenny***	**3–22**
Cork	0–19
Waterford*	1–18
**Tipperary**	**3–19**

All-Ireland final
Kilkenny*	1–18
**Tipperary**	**4–17**

=== All-Ireland quarter-finals ===
25 July 2010
Quarter-final

Cork	1–25 – 0–19	Antrim
B O'Connor 0–6, N McCarthy 1–2, K Murphy 0–4, J Gardiner, T Kenny, P O'Sullivan 0–3, C Naughton 0–2, A Ó hAilpín, W Egan 0–1 each	Report	N McManus 0–9, L Watson 0–6, J Campbell, S McNaughton, K McKeegan, M Herron 0–1 each

Croke Park, Dublin
Attendance: 27,864
Referee: M. Wadding (Waterford)

25 July 2010
Quarter-final

Galway	3–16 – 3–17	Tipperary
J Canning 1–5, D Hayes 1–3, E Ryan 1–1, G Farragher, K Hynes 0–2 each, D Burke, I Tannian, A Callanan 0–1 each	Report	E Kelly 1–7, G Ryan 1–2, S Callanan 1–0, L Corbett 0–3, B Maher 0–2, P Maher, N McGrath, J O'Brien 0–1 each

Croke Park, Dublin
Attendance: 27,864
Referee: J. Owens (Wexford)

=== All-Ireland semi-finals ===
8 August 2010
Semi-final

Kilkenny	3–22 – 0–19	Cork
R Power 1–8, A Fogarty 1–2, E Brennan 1–1, J Fitzpatrick, M Fennelly, H Shefflin, M Comerford 0–2 each, T Walsh, TJ Reid, E Larkin 0–1 each	Report	B O'Connor 0–7, P Horgan 0–6, J Gardiner 0–2, S Óg Ó hAilpín, C Naughton, N McCarthy, J O'Connor 0–1 each

Croke Park, Dublin
Attendance: 41,060
Referee: B. Gavin (Offaly)

15 August 2010
Semi-final

Waterford	1–18 – 3–19	Tipperary
E Kelly 0–5, T Browne, J Mullane, K McGrath 0–3 each, E McGrath 1–0, R Foley, K Moran, S Molumphy, S Prendergast 0–1 each	Report	E Kelly 2–4, J O'Brien, N McGrath 0–6 each, L Corbett 1–2, S McGrath 0–1

Croke Park, Dublin
Attendance: 49,754
Referee: J. Sexton (Cork)

=== All-Ireland Final ===
5 September 2010
Final

Kilkenny	1–18 – 4–17	Tipperary
R Power 1–9, TJ Reid 0–4, M Rice, J Mulhall, H Shefflin, A Fogarty, D Lyng 0–1 each	Report	L Corbett 3–0, E Kelly 0–7, N McGrath 1–0, J O'Brien, B Maher, S Callanan 0–2 each, G Ryan, S Hennessy, B Cummins, B Dunne 0–1 each

Croke Park, Dublin
Attendance: 81,765
Referee: M. Wadding (Waterford)

== Miscellaneous ==
- In the Leinster quarter-final Galway defeat Wexford for the first time in the history of the championship.
- Kilkenny's Henry Shefflin scores twelve points against Dublin in the Leinster semi-final to become the highest-scoring player in the history of the championship. The record was previously held by Shefflin's fellow county man Eddie Keher and had stood since 1973.
- In the All-Ireland qualifiers Antrim defeat Dublin for the first time in the history of the championship.
- Lar Corbett becomes the first player since Eddie O'Brien in 1970 to score a hat-trick of goals in an All-Ireland final.

=== Player facts ===
==== Debutants ====
The following players made their début in the 2010 senior championship:

Player	Team	Date	Opposition	Game
Eoin Reilly	Laois	May 22	Carlow	Leinster first round
Hugh Paddy O'Byrne	Carlow	May 22	Laois	Leinster first round
Eoin Nolan	Carlow	May 22	Laois	Leinster first round
Aidan Harte	Galway	May 29	Wexford	Leinster quarter-final
David Burke	Galway	May 29	Wexford	Leinster quarter-final
Donal Barry	Galway	May 29	Wexford	Leinster quarter-final
Noel Carton	Wexford	May 29	Galway	Leinster quarter-final
Paul Morris	Wexford	May 29	Galway	Leinster quarter-final
Lar Prendergast	Wexford	May 29	Galway	Leinster quarter-final
Colm McFall	Antrim	May 30	Offaly	Leinster quarter-final
Thomas McCann	Antrim	May 30	Offaly	Leinster quarter-final
James Dempsey	Offaly	May 30	Antrim	Leinster quarter-final
Stephen Egan	Offaly	May 30	Antrim	Leinster quarter-final
Shane Kelly	Offaly	May 30	Antrim	Leinster quarter-final
Michael Cahill	Tipperary	May 30	Cork	Munster quarter-final
Brian O'Meara	Tipperary	May 30	Cork	Munster quarter-final
Timmy Hammersley	Tipperary	May 30	Cork	Munster quarter-final
Séamus Hennessy	Tipperary	May 30	Cork	Munster quarter-final
Jody Brennan	Tipperary	May 30	Cork	Munster quarter-final
Lorcán McLoughlin	Cork	May 30	Tipperary	Munster quarter-final
Michael Cussen	Cork	May 30	Tipperary	Munster quarter-final
Ruairí Trainor	Dublin	June 6	Laois	Leinster quarter-final
Shane Ryan	Dublin	June 6	Laois	Leinster quarter-final
Neil Foyle	Laois	June 6	Dublin	Leinster quarter-final
Liam Lawlor	Waterford	June 7	Clare	Munster semi-final
Donal Tuohy	Clare	June 7	Waterford	Munster semi-final
Cian Dillon	Clare	June 7	Waterford	Munster semi-final
Nicky O'Connell	Clare	June 7	Waterford	Munster semi-final
Seán Collins	Clare	June 7	Waterford	Munster semi-final
John Conlon	Clare	June 7	Waterford	Munster semi-final
Darach Honan	Clare	June 7	Waterford	Munster semi-final
Cormac O'Donovan	Clare	June 7	Waterford	Munster semi-final
Domhnall O'Donovan	Clare	June 7	Waterford	Munster semi-final
Shane O'Neill	Limerick	June 20	Cork	Munster semi-final
Kieran O'Rourke	Limerick	June 20	Cork	Munster semi-final
Shaun O'Riordan	Limerick	June 20	Cork	Munster semi-final
Tommy O'Brien	Limerick	June 20	Cork	Munster semi-final
Andrew Brennan	Limerick	June 20	Cork	Munster semi-final
Seán Herlihy	Limerick	June 20	Cork	Munster semi-final
Graeme Mulcahy	Limerick	June 20	Cork	Munster semi-final
Anthony Owens	Limerick	June 20	Cork	Munster semi-final
Richie McKeogh	Limerick	June 20	Cork	Munster semi-final
Lorcan O'Dwyer	Limerick	June 20	Cork	Munster semi-final
Peter Russell	Limerick	June 20	Cork	Munster semi-final
Cathal Mullane	Limerick	June 20	Cork	Munster semi-final
Nicky Quaid	Limerick	June 20	Cork	Munster semi-final
Ray Ryan	Cork	June 20	Limerick	Munster semi-final
John Mulhall	Kilkenny	June 20	Dublin	Leinster semi-final
Éanna Ryan, Jnr	Galway	June 26	Offaly	Leinster semi-final replay
Alan McDonald	Carlow	June 26	Laois	All-Ireland qualifier
Michael Heffernan	Tipperary	July 3	Wexford	All-Ireland qualifier
Patrick Maher	Tipperary	July 3	Wexford	All-Ireland qualifier
David Young	Tipperary	July 3	Wexford	All-Ireland qualifier
Barry Kenny	Wexford	July 3	Tipperary	All-Ireland qualifier
Kieran McGourty	Antrim	July 3	Carlow	All-Ireland qualifier
Michael Noonan	Limerick	July 10	Offaly	All-Ireland qualifier
Cian Hayes	Limerick	July 10	Offaly	All-Ireland qualifier
Daniel Moore	Limerick	July 10	Offaly	All-Ireland qualifier
James V. O'Brien	Limerick	July 10	Offaly	All-Ireland qualifier
Chris O'Connell	Antrim	July 3	Carlow	All-Ireland qualifier
Luke O'Farrell	Cork	July 17	Waterford	Munster final replay
William Egan	Cork	July 17	Waterford	Munster final replay
Brian O'Halloran	Waterford	July 17	Cork	Munster final replay
Thomas Ryan	Waterford	August 15	Tipperary	All-Ireland semi-final

==== Retirees ====
The following players played their last game in the 2010 championship:

Player	Team	Last Game	Date	Opposition	Début
Brian Mullins	Offaly	Leinster quarter-final	May 30	Antrim	2003
Kevin Flynn	Dublin	All-Ireland qualifiers	July 17	Antrim	1996
Ollie Canning	Galway	All-Ireland quarter-final	July 24	Tipperary	1996
Aisake Ó hAilpín	Cork	All-Ireland semi-final	August 8	Kilkenny	2009
Ken McGrath	Waterford	All-Ireland semi-final	August 15	Tipperary	1996
Dan Shanahan	Waterford	All-Ireland semi-final	August 15	Tipperary	1998
Declan Fanning	Tipperary	All-Ireland final	September 5	Kilkenny	2004
Ger Oakley.	Offaly	All Ireland qualifiers	July 18	Tipperary	1998
Derek Lyng	Kilkenny	All-Ireland final	September 5	Tipperary	2001
James Ryall	Kilkenny	All-Ireland final	September 5	Tipperary	2002
Martin Comerford	Kilkenny	All-Ireland final	September 5	Tipperary	2002

== Statistics ==
=== Scoring ===
- First goal of the championship: Joe Fitzpatrick for Laois against Carlow (Leinster First Round)
- Last goal of the championship: Lar Corbett for Tipperary against Kilkenny (All-Ireland Final)
- Widest winning margin: 19 points
  - Kilkenny 4–19 – 0–12 Dublin (Leinster Semi Final)
- Most goals in a match: 6
  - Galway 3–16 – 3–17 Tipperary (All-Ireland Quarter Final)
- Most points in a match: 44
  - Cork 1–25 – 0–19 Antrim (All-Ireland Quarter Final)
- Most goals by one team in a match: 4
  - Kilkenny 4–19 – 0–12 Dublin (Leinster Semi Final)
  - Tipperary 4–17 – 1–18 Kilkenny (All-Ireland Final)
- Most goals scored by a losing team: 3
  - Antrim 3–16 – 2–26 Offaly (Leinster Quarter Final)
  - Laois 3–12 – 1–19 Carlow (Qualifiers Preliminary Round)
  - Antrim 2–18 – 3–12 Carlow (Qualifiers Phase 1)
  - Galway 3–16 – 3–17 Tipperary (All-Ireland Quarter Final)
- Most points scored by a losing team: 19
  - Wexford 0–19 – 3–24 Tipperary (Qualifiers Phase 1)
  - Antrim 1–17 – 0–19 Dublin (Qualifiers Phase 3)
  - Cork 1–25 – 0–19 Antrim (All-Ireland Quarter Final)
  - Kilkenny 3–22 – 0–19 Cork (All-Ireland Semi Final)

=== Discipline ===
- First yellow card of the season: Richard Coady for Carlow against Laois (22 May 2010)
- First red card of the season: Eoin Costelloe for Laois against Carlow (22 May 2010)

=== Top scorers ===
==== Overall ====
	Name	Team	Tally	Total	Games	Average
1	Eoin Kelly	Tipperary	3–44	53	6	8.83
2	Shane Dooley	Offaly	3–39	48	5	9.6
3	Ben O'Connor	Cork	2–31	37	6	6.14
4	Ger Farragher	Galway	1–30	33	5	6.6
5	Eoin Kelly	Waterford	1–27	30	4	7.5
5	Joe Canning	Galway	4–18	30	5	6
7	Richie Power	Kilkenny	3–20	29	4	7.25
7	Lar Corbett	Tipperary	6–11	29	6	4.83
7	Neil McManus	Antrim	1–26	29	4	7.25
10	Alan McCrabbe	Dublin	0–28	28	4	7

==== Single game ====
	Name	Tally	Total	County		Opposition
1	Ger Farragher	0–13	13	Galway	v	Wexford
1	Shane Dooley	1–10	13	Offaly	v	Antrim
3	Henry Shefflin	0–12	12	Kilkenny	v	Dublin
3	Richie Power	1–9	12	Kilkenny	v	Cork
5	Diarmuid Lyng	0–11	11	Wexford	v	Galway
5	Paudie Kehoe	0–11	11	Carlow	v	Laois
5	Eoin Kelly	0–11	11	Tipperary	v	Offaly
5	Eoin Kelly	1–8	11	Waterford	v	Cork
5	Richie Power	1–8	11	Kilkenny	v	Cork

== Awards ==
=== Monthly ===
Month	Vodafone Player of the Month		Opel GPA Player of the Month	
Month	Player	County	Player	County
May	Aisake Ó hAilpín	Cork	Ger Farragher	Galway
June	Shane Dooley	Offaly	Damien Hayes	Galway
July	Tony Browne	Waterford	Michael Walsh	Waterford
August	Noel McGrath	Tipperary	Richie Power	Kilkenny
September	Lar Corbett	Tipperary	Lar Corbett	Tipperary

== Managerial changes ==
The following managerial changes took place during the championship.

Team	Outgoing manager	Manner of departure	Date of vacancy	Replaced by	Date of appointment	Position
Laois	Niall Rigney	Resigned	30 June 2010	Brendan Fennelly	27 September 2010	Defeated in All-Ireland Qualifiers preliminary round
Limerick	Justin McCarthy	End of term	10 July 2010	Dónal O'Grady	22 September 2010	Defeated in All-Ireland Qualifiers phase 2

== See also ==
- 2010 Christy Ring Cup (Tier 2)
- 2010 Nicky Rackard Cup (Tier 3)
- 2010 Lory Meagher Cup (Tier 4)
