= Jimmy Prendergast =

Irish hurler

Personal information
- Native name: Séamus de Priondragás (Irish)
- Born: Oulart, County Wexford
- Height: 5 ft 9 in (175 cm)

Sport
- Sport: Hurling
- Position: Left corner-back
Club
- Years: Club
- 1960s-1980s: Oulart–The Ballagh
Inter-county
- Years: County
- 1972-1978: Wexford
Inter-county titles
- Leinster titles: 2
- All-Irelands: 0
- NFL: 1
- All Stars: 0

Jimmy Prendergast (born 1949 in Oulart, County Wexford) is a former Irish sportsman. He played hurling with his local club Oulart–The Ballagh and was a member of the Wexford senior inter-county team from 1972 until 1978.His son Lar Prendergast plays hurling for Wexford.
