= 2024 Munster Senior Hurling Championship =

Hurling Championship

Munster Senior Hurling Championship
Tournament details
- Province: Munster
- Year: 2024
- Trophy: The Mick Mackey Cup
- Date: April - June 2024
- Teams: 5
- Defending champions: Limerick

Winners
- Champions: Limerick (25th win)
- Manager: John Kiely
- Captain: Declan Hannon
- Qualify for: Munster SHC Final; All-Ireland SHC

Runners-up
- Runners-up: Clare

Other
- Matches played: 11
- Website: https://munster.gaa.ie/

The 2024 Munster Senior Hurling Championship is the 137th edition of the Munster Senior Hurling Championship since its establishment by the Munster Council in 1888 and is the highest-tier of Hurling for senior county teams in Munster. It is contested by five Munster GAA county teams ranked 1–5 in the 2024 All-Ireland Senior Hurling Championship.

The competition began on 21 April with the final on 9 June. Limerick, captained by Declan Hannon retained the title for the sixth year in a row after a 1-26 to 1-20 win against Clare in the final.

== Format ==
=== Group stage (10 matches) ===
Each team plays each other once. The 1st and 2nd placed teams advance to the Munster final and the 3rd placed team advances to the All-Ireland preliminary quarter-finals. All other teams are eliminated from the championship.

=== Final (1 match) ===
The top 2 teams in the group stage contest this game. The Munster champions advance to the All-Ireland semi-finals and the Munster runners-up advance to the All-Ireland quarter-finals.

== Teams ==
=== General information ===
Five counties contested the 2024 Munster Senior Hurling Championship:

County	Last Championship Title	Last All-Ireland Title	Position in 2024 Championship
Clare	1998	2013	Runners-up
Cork	2018	2005	3rd
Limerick	2023	2023	Champions
Tipperary	2016	2019	5th
Waterford	2010	1959	4th

=== Personnel and kits ===
County	Manager	Captain(s)	Sponsor
Clare	Brian Lohan	Conor Cleary	Pat O'Donnell
Cork	Pat Ryan	Sean O'Donoghue	Sports Direct
Limerick	John Kiely	Declan Hannon	JP McManus
Tipperary	Liam Cahill	Ronan Maher	Fiserv
Waterford	Davy Fitzgerald	Jamie Barron and Stephen Bennett	Suir Engineering

== Group stage ==
=== Table ===
Pos	Team	Pld	W	D	L	SF	SA	Diff	Pts	Qualification
1	Limerick	4	3	0	1	8-98	6-78	+26	6	Advance to Munster Final
2	Clare	4	3	0	1	9-89	8-89	+3	6	Advance to Munster Final
3	Cork	4	2	0	2	11-107	9-98	+15	4	Advance to All-Ireland preliminary quarter-finals
4	Waterford	4	1	1	2	9-86	6-103	-8	3	
5	Tipperary	4	0	1	3	2-90	10-102	–36	1	

=== Munster round 1 ===
21 April 2024 Round 1	Clare	1-18 (21) – (24) 3-15	Limerick	Ennis
2pm		(HT: 1-10 - 0-8)		Venue: Cusack Park
	Pts: Aidan McCarthy (1-10, 8f); David Fitzgerald, Mark Rodgers, Tony Kelly (f) (0-2 each); Shane O’Donnell, Seadna Morey (0-1 each)	Report	Pts: Aaron Gillane (1-5, 5f); Donnacha Ó Dalaigh (1-1); Gearoid Hegarty (0-3); Diarmaid Byrnes (1-0f); Cathal O’Neill, David Reidy (0-2 each); Kyle Hayes, Cian Lynch (0-1 each)	Referee: C Lyons (Cork); Attendance: 20,055; TV: RTÉ2

21 April 2024 Round 1	Waterford	2-25 (31) – (28) 1-25	Cork	Waterford
4pm		(HT: 1-11 - 0-10)		Venue: Walsh Park
	Pts: Dessie Hutchinson 0-10 (9fs), Jamie Barron, Stephen Bennett (1-0 penalty, 1f) 1-3 each, Calum Lyons 0-3, Patrick Curran, Jack Prendergast 0-2 each. Neil Montgomery, Michael Kiely 0-1 each	Report	Pts: Alan Connolly 1-4 (2fs), Patrick Horgan 0-7 (7fs), Darragh Fitzgibbon 0-4, Shane Barrett 0-3, Seamus Harnedy 0-2, Ger Mellerick, Mark Coleman, Conor Lehane, Robbie O'Flynn, Brian Hayes 0-1 each	Referee: M Kennedy (Tipperary); Attendance: 11,973; TV: GAAGO

=== Munster round 2 ===
28 April 2024 Round 2	Cork	3-24 (33) – (35) 3-26	Clare	Cork
14:00		(HT: 0-14 - 0-12)		Venue: Páirc Uí Chaoimh
	Pts: Patrick Horgan 2-10 (1-7fs, 2 65s), Declan Dalton 0-4 (3fs), Séamus Harnedy 0-3, Robert Downey 1-0, Darragh Fitzgibbon, Alan Connolly 0-2, Tim O’Mahony, Ciarán Joyce, Shane Kingston 0-1 each	Report	Pts: Aidan McCarthy 0-10 (8fs), Mark Rodgers 1-6 (1f, 1 sideline), David Fitzgerald, Shane O’Donnell 1-1 each, David Reidy 0-3, Peter Duggan, Diarmuid Ryan 0-2 each, David McInerney 0-1	Referee: J Owens (Wexford); Attendance: 36,841; TV: GAAGO

28 April 2024 Round 2	Limerick	2-27 (33) – (18) 0-18	Tipperary	Limerick
16:00		(HT: 0-12 – 0-7)		Venue: Gaelic Grounds
	Pts: Aaron Gillane 1-8 (7fs), Peter Casey 1-2, Adam English 0-4, Cathal O’Neill, Tom Morrissey 0-3 each, David Reidy, Diarmaid Byrnes (2fs) 0-2 each, Kyle Hayes, William O’Donoghue, Donnacha O Dálaigh 0-1 each	Report	Pts: Jason Forde 0-9 (8fs), Mark Kehoe, Gearoid O’Connor (1f) 0-2 each, Eoghan Connolly, Alan Tynan, Patrick Maher, Noel McGrath, Johnny Ryan 0-1 each	Referee: L Gordon (Galway); Attendance: 33,475; TV: RTÉ2

=== Munster round 3 ===
4 May 2024 Round 3	Waterford	3-21 (30) – (30) 1-27	Tipperary	Waterford
18:00		(HT: 2-8 – 0-12)		Venue: Walsh Park
	Pts: Stephen Bennett 2-3 (1-0 pen); Dessie Hutchinson 0-6 (3f); Jack Prendergast 1-1; Calum Lyons 0-3; Patrick Curran 0-2; Kieran Bennett, Darragh Lyons, Neil Montgomery, Michael Kiely, Jack Fagan, Shane Bennett 0-1 each	Report	Pts: Seánie Kenneally 1-1; Gearóid O’Connor (3f), Mark Kehoe 0-4 each; Jason Forde (2f), Jake Morris 0-3 each; Ronan Maher (1f), Eoghan Connolly, Alan Tynan, Noel McGrath 0-2 each; Michael Breen, Darragh Stakelum, Patrick Maher, John McGrath 0-1 each	Referee: J Owens (Wexford); Attendance: 11,966; TV: GAAGO

11 May 2024 Round 3	Cork	3-28 (37) – (35) 3-26	Limerick	Cork
19:00		(HT: 2-15 - 1-10)		Venue: Páirc Uí Chaoimh
	Pts: Patrick Horgan 1-11 (1-0 pen, 10fs), Shane Barrett, Séamus Harnedy 1-2 each, Darragh Fitzgibbon 0-5, Declan Dalton (2fs), Alan Connolly, Brian Hayes 0-2 each, Ethan Twomey, Shane Kingston 0-1 each	Report	Pts: Séamus Flanagan 3-3, Aaron Gillane 0-7 (7fs), Gearóid Hegarty 0-4, Cathal O’Neill 0-3, Diarmaid Byrnes (2fs), Tom Morrissey 0-2 each, Kyle Hayes, Cian Lynch, David Reidy, Adam English, Aidan O’Connor 0-1 each	Referee: S Stack (Dublin); Attendance: 41,670; TV: GAAGO

=== Munster round 4 ===
19 May 2024 Round 4	Clare	4-21 (33) – (32) 2-26	Waterford	Ennis
2pm		(HT: 2-13 - 0-14)		Venue: Cusack Park
	Pts: David Fitzgerald, Mark Rodgers (1’65) (1-4 each); Aidan McCarthy (0-5, 4f); Darragh Lohan, Tony Kelly (1-0 each); Shane O’Donnell, Ian Galvin (0-2 each); David Reidy, Cathal Malone, Diarmuid Ryan, Peter Duggan (0-1 each)	Report	Pts: Dessie Hutchinson (0-6, 5f); Stephen Bennett, Shane Bennett (1-0 Pen) (1-2 each); Kevin Mahony (0-4); Jack Prendergast, Tadhg de Burca (1f), Padraig Fitzgerald (0-2 each); Kieran Bennett, Jamie Barron, Jack Fagan, Patrick Fitzgerald, Ian Kenny, Calum Lyons (0-1 each)	Referee: L Gordon (Galway); Attendance: 19,893; TV: RTÉ2

19 May 2024 Round 4	Tipperary	1-21 (24) – (42) 4-30	Cork	Thurles
4pm		(HT: 1-12 - 1-15)		Venue: Semple Stadium
	Pts: J. Forde (0-5, 3 frees); M. Kehoe (1-0); J. Morris, J. McGrath (frees) (0-3 each); G. O’Connor, D. Stakelum N. McGrath (0-2 each); A. Tynan, R. Maher (free), C. Bowe, S. Hayes (0-1 each)	Report	Pts: P. Horgan (1-9, 0-5 frees); A. Connolly (3-1); S. Kingston (0-4); D. Fitzgibbon, S. Harnedy (0-3 each); S. Barrett, B. Hayes, R. Downey (0-2 each); N. O’Leary, D. Dalton, C. Lehane, L. Meade (0-1 each)	Referee: T Walsh (Waterford); Attendance: 43,972; TV: RTÉ2

=== Munster round 5 ===
26 May 2024 Round 5	Limerick	0-30 (30) – (20) 2-14	Waterford	Limerick
16:00		(HT: 0-14 - 1-6)		Venue: Gaelic Grounds
	Pts: Aaron Gillane 0-7 (7fs), Tom Morrissey 0-4, Kyle Hayes 0-3, Shane O’Brien 0-3, Diarmaid Byrnes 0-2 (1f), Cathal O’Neill, David Reidy, Gearoid Hegarty 0-2 each, Barry Nash, William O’Donoghue, Conor Boylan, Cian Lynch, and Adam English 0-1 each	Report	Pts: Shane Bennett 2-0, Stephen Bennett 0-5 (4fs), Calum Lyons and Dessie Hutchinson (1f) 0-2 each, Paddy Leavy, Jamie Barron, Jack Prendergast, Patrick Fitzgerald, Kevin Mahony 0-1 each	Referee: M Kennedy (Tipperary); Attendance: 31,487; TV: RTÉ2

26 May 2024 Round 5	Tipperary	0-24 (24) – (27) 1-24	Clare	Thurles
16:00		(HT: 0-11 - 0-11)		Venue: Semple Stadium
	Pts: Jake Morris 0-11 (7fs), Seanie Kenneally 0-3, Ronan Maher 0-2 (1f), Eoghan Connolly and Gearoid O’Connor (2fs) 0-2 each, Barry Heffernan, Alan Tynan, Noel McGrath, and Bryan O’Mara 0-1 each	Report	Pts: Aidan McCarthy 0-9 (6fs), Diarmuid Ryan 1-1, David Fitzgerald 0-3, Mark Rodgers 0-3 (2fs), Shane O’Donnell and Tony Kelly 0-2 each, Darragh Lohan, Peter Duggan, David Reidy, Ian Galvin 0-1 each	Referee: J Murphy (Limerick); Attendance: 19,418; TV: RTÉ News (TV channel)

== Knockout stage ==
=== Munster Final ===
9 June 2024
4:30pm
Final

Limerick	1-26 (29) – (23) 1-20	Clare
Gearóid Hegarty 1-2; Diarmaid Byrnes (3f), Aaron Gillane (4f) 0-5 each; Tom Morrissey 0-4 (1f); Declan Hannon, Kyle Hayes, David Reidy, Shane O’Brien 0-2 each; Cathal O’Neill, Adam English 0-1 each	Report	Aidan McCarthy 0-8 (6f); Peter Duggan 1-1; David Fitzgerald 0-4; Tony Kelly 0-3; Mark Rodgers 0-2 (2f); Shane O’Donnell, Ian Galvin 0-1 each

Semple Stadium
Attendance: 45,148
Referee: C Lyons (Cork)
Man of the match: Gearóid Hegarty (Limerick)
- Limerick advance to the All-Ireland semi-finals and Clare advance to the All-Ireland quarter-finals

== Stadia and locations ==
Locations of the 2024 Munster SHC teams

County	Location	Province	Stadium	Capacity
Clare	Ennis	Munster	Cusack Park	19,000
Cork	Cork	Munster	Páirc Uí Chaoimh	45,000
Limerick	Limerick	Munster	Gaelic Grounds	44,023
Tipperary	Thurles	Munster	Semple Stadium	45,690
Waterford	Waterford	Munster	Walsh Park	11,046

== Attendance ==
Attendances
Matches	11
Total attendance	315,898
Average attendance	28,718
Highest attendance	45,148; Limerick 1-26 (29) - (23) 1-20 Clare; 9 June 2024

== Championship statistics ==
=== Top scorers ===
==== Top scorer overall ====
Rank	Player	County	Tally	Total	Matches	Average
1	Patrick Horgan	Cork	4-37	49	4	12
2	Aidan McCarthy	Clare	1-25	28	3	9
3	Aaron Gillane	Limerick	2-20	26	3	8
4	Jason Forde	Tipperary	0-17	17	3	5
5	Dessie Hutchinson	Waterford	0-22	22	3	7
6	Stephen Bennett	Waterford	4-08	20	3	6
7	Alan Connolly	Cork	4-09	21	4	5

==== In a single game ====
Rank	Player	County	Tally	Total	Opposition
1	Patrick Horgan	Cork	2-10	16	Clare
2	Patrick Horgan	Cork	1-11	14	Limerick
3	Aidan McCarthy	Clare	1-10	13	Limerick
4	Séamus Flanagan	Limerick	3-03	12	Cork
4	Patrick Horgan	Cork	1-09	12	Tipperary
6	Aaron Gillane	Limerick	1-08	11	Tipperary
7	Dessie Hutchinson	Waterford	0-10	10	Cork
7	Aidan McCarthy	Clare	0-10	10	Cork
7	Alan Connolly	Cork	3-01	10	Tipperary

=== Scoring events ===
- Widest winning margin: 18 points
  - Tipperary 1-21 - 4-30 Cork (Round 4)
- Most goals in a match: 6
  - Cork 3-24 - 3-26 Clare (Round 2)
  - Cork 3-28 - 3-26 Limerick (Round 3)
  - Clare 4-21 - 2-26 Waterford (Round 4)
- Most points in a match: 54
  - Cork 3-28 - 3-26 Limerick (Round 3)
- Most goals by one team in a match: 4
  - Clare 4-21 - 2-26 Waterford (Round 4)
  - Tipperary 1-21 - 4-30 Cork (Round 4)
- Most points by one team in a match: 30
  - Tipperary 1-21 - 4-30 Cork (Round 4)
  - Limerick 0-30 - 2-14 Waterford (Round 5)
- Highest aggregate score: 72 points
  - Cork 3-28 - 3-26 Limerick (Round 3)
- Lowest aggregate score: 45 points
  - Clare 1-18 - 3-15 Limerick (Round 1)

== Miscellaneous ==
- Limerick become the first ever county to win 6 consecutive Munster titles.
- Clare become the third ever team to lose 3 consecutive Munster titles.

== See also ==
- 2024 All-Ireland Senior Hurling Championship
- 2024 Leinster Senior Hurling Championship
- 2024 Joe McDonagh Cup (Tier 2)
- 2024 Christy Ring Cup (Tier 3)
- 2024 Nicky Rackard Cup (Tier 4)
- 2024 Lory Meagher Cup (Tier 5)
