= Lar Prendergast =

Irish hurler

Personal information
- Native name: Labhras de Priondragás (Irish)
- Born: Oulart, County Wexford

Sport
- Sport: Hurling
- Position: Full-back
Club
- Years: Club
- ?-present: Oulart–The Ballagh
Inter-county
Years	County	Apps (scores)
2010-2014	Wexford	2
Inter-county titles
- All-Irelands: 0
- NHL: 1 (Div 2)

Laurence "Lar" Prendergast is an Irish sportsperson. He plays hurling with his local club Oulart–The Ballagh and with the Wexford senior inter-county team. He is the son of former Wexford hurling star Jimmy Prendergast.

== Playing career ==
=== Inter-county ===
Prendergast rarely appears on field unless as a sub since his senior debut during the National Hurling League against Clare. However during a repeat of last year's league final he got his chance to play full on the field.
