= Garvan McCarthy =

Irish hurler

Personal information
- Born: 3 September 1980 (age 46) Glanmire, County Cork, Ireland
- Occupation: Carpenter
- Height: 6 ft 2 in (188 cm)

Sport
- Sport: Hurling
- Position: Centre-forward
Club
- Years: Club
- Sarsfields
Club titles
- Cork titles: 2
College
- Years: College
- 2001-2003: Cork Institute of Technology
College titles
- Fitzgibbon titles: 0
Inter-county
| Years | County | Apps (scores) |
| 2004-2005 | Cork | 2 (2-01) |
Inter-county titles
- Munster titles: 0
- All-Irelands: 1
- NHL: 0
- All Stars: 0

Garvan McCarthy (born 3 September 1980) is an Irish former hurler. At club level he played with Sarsfields and was also a member of the Cork senior hurling team. He usually lined out as a forward.

== Career ==
McCarthy first came to prominence at juvenile and underage levels with the Sarsfields club before eventually joining the club's senior team. He was a member of the club's extended panel when Sarsfields won County Senior Championship titles in 2008 and 2010. McCarthy first appeared on the inter-county scene as part of the Cork team that won the All-Ireland Minor Championship title in 1998. He was drafted onto the Cork senior hurling team in 2004 and was a non-playing substitute when Cork beat Kilkenny in the 2004 All-Ireland final. McCarthy was released from the panel during the 2005 season.

== Career statistics ==
| Team | Year | National League | | | Munster | | All-Ireland | | Total | |
| Team | Year | Division | Apps | Score | Apps | Score | Apps | Score | Apps | Score |
|---|---|---|---|---|---|---|---|---|---|---|
| Cork | 2004 | Division 1B | 0 | 0-00 | 1 | 1-00 | 1 | 1-01 | 2 | 2-01 |
| Cork | 2005 | Division 1B | 6 | 1-08 | 0 | 0-00 | 0 | 0-00 | 6 | 1-08 |
| Career total | | | 6 | 1-08 | 1 | 1-00 | 1 | 1-01 | 8 | 3-09 |

== Honours ==
Sarsfields

- Cork Senior Hurling Championship: 2008, 2010

Cork

- All-Ireland Senior Hurling Championship: 2004
- All-Ireland Minor Hurling Championship: 1998
- Munster Minor Hurling Championship: 1998
