= Bryan Phelan =

Irish hurler

Personal information
- Native name: Brian Ó Faoláin (Irish)
- Nickname: The Bull
- Born: 1979 (age 46–47) Waterford City

Sport
- Sport: Hurling
- Position: Left wing-back
Club
- Years: Club
- De La Salle
Club titles
- Waterford titles: 1
- Munster titles: 1
Inter-county
- Years: County
- 2002–: Waterford
Inter-county titles
- Munster titles: 3
- All-Irelands: 0
- NHL: 1

Bryan Phelan (born 1979) is an Irish sportsman. He plays hurling with his local club De La Salle and with the Waterford senior inter-county team.

== Career ==
=== Club ===
Phelan has played from a young age with his local club, De La Salle. While not having much success at first, 2008 turned out to be a fruitful year. Phelan played a vital role in De La Salle's first ever Waterford Senior Hurling Championship beating Abbeyside in the final. Phelan followed this up with victory in the Munster Senior Club Hurling Championship later that year. In the 2008–09 All-Ireland Club semi-final, De La Salle were struggling against Ruairí Óg GAC being a point down deep in injury time. From over 75 meters out, Phelan cut a side-line ball over the bar to force the game into extra time. De La Salle later progressed to the final.

=== Inter-county ===
Phelan has featured on and off for Waterford since 2002. Phelan has an impressive haul of trophies at inter-county level having won 3 Munster Senior Hurling Championships and one National Hurling League in 2007. Phelan was also part of the squad that lost the All-Ireland Hurling Final to Kilkenny in 2008.
