= 2006 Interprovincial Hurling Championship =

- Dates: 14 October 2006 - 28 October 2006
- Teams: 4
- Sponsor: Martin Donnelly
- Champions: Leinster (25th title); Eddie Brennan (captain)
- Runners-up: Connacht

Tournament statistics
- Matches played: 3
- Goals scored: 6 (2 per match)
- Points scored: 104 (34.67 per match)
- Top scorer(s): Eugene Cloonan (2-15)

The 2006 Interprovincial Hurling Championship was the 79th staging of the Interprovincial Championship since its establishment by the Gaelic Athletic Association in 1927. The championship began on 14 October 2006 and ended on 28 October 2006.

Munster were the defending champions, however, they were beaten by Connacht in the semi-final.

On 28 October 2006, Leinster won the championship following a 1-23 to 0–17 defeat of Connacht in the final at Pearse Stadium. This was their 25th championship title overall and their first title since 2003.

Connacht's Eugene Cloonan was the championship's top scorer with 2-15.

== Results ==
=== Semi-finals ===
| 14 October 2006 Semi-final | Leinster | 2-19 - 0-12 | Ulster | Parnell Park, Dublin |
| | D Franks 0-6 (6f), A Fogarty 1-2, R Power 0-4 (2f), J Bergin 1-0, R McCarthy 0-3, J McCaffrey 0-2, Diarmuid Lyng 0-1, E Brennan 0-1. | Report | J McIntosh 0-10 (5f) S McBride, R Convery 0-1 each. | Referee: M Haverty (Galway) |

| 15 October 2006 Semi-final | Munster | 1-16 - 2-17 | Connacht | Cusack Park, Ennis |
| | E Kelly 1-6, P Kelly 0-3, N Gilligan 0-2, T Carmody 0-2, M Walsh 0-1, A O'Shaughnessy 0-1, N Moran 0-1. | | E Cloonan 2-6, R Murray 0-3, D Tierney 0-2, G Farragher 0-1, A Kerins 0-1, F Healy 0-1, K Broderick 0-1, T O'Regan 0-1, D Collins 0-1. | Referee: B Gavin (Offaly) |

=== Final ===
| 28 October 2006 Final | Connacht | 0-17 - 1-23 | Leinster | Pearse Stadium, Galway |
| | E Cloonan 0-9 (7f); I Tannian, M Kerins, F Healy 0-2 each; R Murray, D Tierney 0-1 each. | Report | R Power 0-7 (5f 1 65); E Brennan 0-6; J Bergin 1-3; A Fogarty 0-4; E Larkin 0-2; D Lyng 0-1. | Referee: S Roche (Tipperary) |

== Top scorers ==
Top scorers overall

| Rank | Player | Club | Tally | Total | Matches | Average |
|---|---|---|---|---|---|---|
| 1 | Eugene Cloonan | Connacht | 2-15 | 21 | 2 | 10.50 |
| 2 | Johnny McIntosh | Ulster | 0-10 | 10 | 1 | 10.00 |
| 3 | Joe Bergin | Leinster | 2-03 | 9 | 2 | 4.50 |
| 3 | Eoin Kelly | Munster | 1-06 | 9 | 1 | 9.00 |
| 3 | Aidan Fogarty | Leinster | 1-06 | 9 | 2 | 4.50 |
