= Donal Tuohy =

Irish hurler

Personal information
- Native name: Domhnall Ó Tuathaigh (Irish)
- Born: 20 September 1989 (age 37) Ennis, County Clare, Ireland
- Occupation: Pricing advisor
- Height: 5 ft 10 in (178 cm)

Sport
- Sport: Hurling
- Position: Goalkeeper
Club
- Years: Club
- 2007-present: Crusheen
Club titles
- Clare titles: 2
College
- Years: College
- 2008-2013: NUI Galway
College titles
- Fitzgibbon titles: 1
Inter-county
- Years: County
- 2010-2021: Clare
Inter-county titles
- Munster titles: 0
- All-Irelands: 1
- NHL: 1
- All Stars: 0

Donal Tuohy (born 20 September 1989) is an Irish hurler who plays as a goalkeeper for club side Crusheen and at inter-county level with the Clare senior hurling team. Tuohy attended NUI Galway. He was part of the university hurling team during their winning 2010 Fitzgibbon Cup campaign.

He left the Clare hurling team in 2021.

== Honours ==
NUI Galway

- Fitzgibbon Cup (1): 2010

Crusheen

- Clare Senior Hurling Championship (2): 2010, 2011

Clare

- All-Ireland Senior Hurling Championship (1): 2013
- National Hurling League (1): 2016
- All-Ireland Under-21 Hurling Championship (1): 2009
- Munster Under-21 Hurling Championship (1): 2009
