= 2005 Interprovincial Hurling Championship =

- Dates: 23 October 2005 - 6 November 2005
- Teams: 4
- Sponsor: Martin Donnelly
- Champions: Munster (33rd title); John Gardiner (captain); Joe O'Leary (manager)
- Runners-up: Leinster; Richie Mullally (captain); John Conran (manager)

Tournament statistics
- Matches played: 3
- Goals scored: 5 (1.67 per match)
- Points scored: 108 (36 per match)
- Top scorer(s): James Young (0-19)

The 2005 Interprovincial Hurling Championship was the 78th staging of the Interprovincial Championship since its establishment by the Gaelic Athletic Association in 1927. The championship began on 23 October 2005 and ended on 6 November 2005.

Connacht were the defending champions, however, they were beaten by Leinster in the semi-final.

On 6 November 2005, Munster won the championship following a 1-21 to 2-14 defeat of Leinster in the final at Boston. This was their 43rd championship title overall and their first title since 2001.

Leinster's James Young was the championship's top scorer with 0-19.

== Results ==
=== Semi-finals ===
23 October 2005 Semi-final	Connacht	0-10 - 1-25	Leinster	St. Brendan's Park, Loughrea
	N Healy 0-7 (4f, '65), S Kavanagh (1f), F Healy, T Tierney 0-1 each.	Report	J Young 0-12 (9f), G Hanniffy 1-2, R Power 0-4, T Walsh, E Brennan, B Carroll 0-2 each, M Comerford 0-1.	Referee: J McDonnell (Tipperary)

23 October 2005 Semi-final	Ulster	1-13 - 0-25	Munster	Casement Park, Belfast
	J McIntosh 0-4 (0-2f), B McFall 0-3 (1f), K Stewart 1-0, G Biggs 0-2, S Wilson (1f), A Savage, P Braniff, L Richmond 0-1 each.	Report	B O'Connor 0-7 (6f), P Kelly 0-6 (2f), N Gilligan 0-3, J Gardiner, O Moran, S Prendergast, E Kelly 0-2 each, S Butler 0-1.	Referee: B Gavin (Offaly)

=== Final ===
6 November 2005 Final	Munster	1-21 - 2-14	Leinster	Irish Cultural Centre, Boston
	B O’Connor 0-7 (0-6 frees); O Moran 1-2; P Kelly 0-4 (all frees); N Gilligan 0-3; T Carmody 0-3; D McMahon, S Butler, 0-1 each.		J Young 0-7 (0-6 frees); E Brennan 1-2; B Carroll 1-1; T Walsh 0-2; R Power, G Hanniffy, 0-1 each.	Referee: M Haverty (Galway)

== Scoring statistics ==
Top scorers overall

Rank	Player	Club	Tally	Total	Matches	Average
1	James Young	Leinster	0-19	19	2	9.50
2	Ben O'Connor	Munster	0-14	14	2	7.00
3	Paul Kelly	Munster	0-10	10	2	5.00
