= Liam Lawlor (hurler) =

Irish hurler and Gaelic footballer

Liam Lawlo
Personal information
- Native name: Liam Ó Leathlobhair (Irish)
- Born: 18 June 1985 (age 41) Waterford, Ireland
- Height: 1.85 m (6 ft 1 in)

Sport
- Football Position: Centre Back
- Hurling Position: Full Back
Club
- Years: Club
- 2002–2016: The Nire–Fourmilewater Newcastle Tipperary
Club titles
	Football	Hurling
Waterford titles	4	
Inter-county
- Years: County
- 2007–2009 2003–2006, 2010–2014: Waterford footballers Waterford hurlers
Inter-county titles
	Football	Hurling
Munster Titles		2

Liam Lawlor (GAA Player; born 18 June 1985) is a former intercounty footballer and hurler, for Waterford. He also plays with his club Newcastle in Tipperary.

== Playing career ==
=== Club ===
Lawlor plays his club hurling and football for Newcastle GAA club in Tipperary. Lawlor formerly played his club hurling with his local club Fourmilewater Hurling Club, in Ballymacarbry, County Waterford and he played football for The Nire. He has played with The Nire–Fourmilewater from underage upwards. He has four county senior football titles with The Nire 2006, 2008, 2014 & 2016. He also won an U-21 (A) championship in 2004.

=== Senior Intercounty ===
Hurling

Liam Lawlor made his intercounty senior championship debut against Clare in 2010. He played full back. He started all four games in Waterford's 2010 championship run, winning the Munster title along the way when Waterford defeated Cork after a replay in the final. Waterford's run ended when they were defeated by Tipperary in the All-Ireland semi-final.

He played two years county minor and three years county under-21 hurling.

Football

Liam was a member of the Waterford senior football panel from 2007 to 2009. He made his debut as a second-half substitute against Kerry in the Munster senior football semi-final in the Fraher field. In 2008 he started against Clare and in 2009 he started both games in 2010, against Cork in the Munster championship and Meath in the qualifiers. He returned to the football panel in 2015 and played in both of Waterford's championship games, in which they were defeated by Tipperary and Offaly.

He played in a Munster U-21 football final against Cork in 2006, Waterford were heavily defeated.

He also played one year county minor football, a relatively successful year for Waterford, played 5 games, won: 0, lost:3 and drew: 2. They registered draws against Cork and Clare.
