= 2003 Munster Senior Hurling Championship final =

- Event: 2003 Munster Senior Hurling Championship
Cork	Waterford
3-16	3-12
- Date: 29 June 2003
- Venue: Semple Stadium
- Referee: P. O'Connor (Limerick)
- Attendance: 52,833
- Weather: Sunny

The 2003 Munster Senior Hurling Championship final was a hurling match played on Sunday 29 June at Semple Stadium in Thurles. It was contested by Cork and Waterford. Cork, captained by Alan Browne, claimed the title, beating Waterford on a scoreline of 3-16 to 3-12.

Waterford was leading by 1-9 to 1-4 at halftime. John Mullane scored three goals in the game for the defending champions, one in the ninth minute of the first half and two in the second half but ended up on the losing side. Paul Flynn was also sent off for Waterford for a second bookable offense deep in injury time.

== Match ==
=== Details ===
29 June
Final

Cork	3-16 - 3-12	Waterford
J. Deane 1-4 (0-2 frees); A. Browne 1-1; B. O'Connor 0-4; J. Gardiner 0-4 (0-2 frees, 0-1 seventy); S. O hAilpín 1-0; N. McCarthy 0-2; T. Kenny 0-1		J. Mullane 3-1; D. Bennett 0-4; D. Bennett 0-4 (0-2 frees); P. Flynn 0-4 (0-1 free); E. Kelly, E. McGrath and T. Browne 0-1 each

Semple Stadium, Thurles
Referee: P. O'Connor (Limerick) Report
