= John Mullane =

Irish hurler (born 1981)

Personal information
- Native name: Seán Ó Maoláin (Irish)
- Born: 28 January 1981 (age 45) Waterford
- Occupation: Electrician
- Height: 6 ft 0 in (183 cm)

Sport
- Sport: Hurling
- Position: Right corner forward
Club
- Years: Club
- 1998–: De La Salle
Club titles
- Waterford titles: 3
- Munster titles: 2
- All-Ireland Titles: 0
Inter-county*
Years	County	Apps (scores)
2001–2012	Waterford	47 (15–134)
Inter-county titles
- Munster titles: 4
- All-Irelands: 0
- NHL: 1
- All Stars: 5
- *Inter County team apps and scores correct as of 20:35, 28 October 2012.

John Mullane (born 28 January 1981) is an Irish hurler who previously played as a right corner-forward for the Waterford senior team.

Mullane joined the team during the 2001 championship and immediately became a regular member of the starting fifteen. Since then he has won four Munster winners' medals, one National League winners' medal and five All Star awards. Mullane has ended up as an All-Ireland runner-up on one occasion.

At club level Mullane is a two-time Munster medalist with De La Salle. In addition to this he has also won three county club championship medals.

== Playing career ==
=== Club ===
Mullane plays his club hurling with the De La Salle club and has enjoyed much success.

After few victories in the minor and under-21 grades, Mullane lined out in his first championship decider in 2005 as De La Salle faced Ballygunner. A narrow 2–10 to 1–12 defeat was Mullane's lot on that occasion.

After a number of years of early exits in the county championship, De La Salle reached the championship final again in 2008. Abbeyside were the opponents on that occasion and a close game developed. At the final whistle De La Salle were the champions by 0–11 to 0–9 and Mullane collected his first county championship medal. De La Salle subsequently represented Waterford in the provincial series and even reached the final. A narrow 1–9 to 0–10 defeat of Adare gave Mullane a first Munster medal. Mullane's side later reached the All-Ireland decider where Portumna provided the opposition. De La Salle were well beaten on that occasion by 2–24 to 1–8.

After surrendering their county and provincial titles in 2009, De La Salle bounced back the following year to reach the county final once again. A 3–13 to 1–11 defeat of Ballygunner gave Mullane a second championship medal. He later added a second Munster medal to his collection following a one-point defeat of Thurles Sarsfield's.

Two years later Mullane won a third county championship medal as De La Salle trounced Dungarvan by 1–21 to 0–12 in the county final.

=== Inter-county ===
Mullane began his inter-county career as a member of the Waterford minor and under-21 hurling team in the late nineties, however, he had little success in these grades.

His senior championship debut for his native-county came in the first round of the provincial championship in 2001 against Limerick. After a lightning start to the game, Mullane disappointingly had to leave the field after pulling his hamstring. Limerick went on to win the game.

In 2002 Mullane claimed his first Munster winners' medal as Waterford defeated Tipperary by 2–23 to 3–12 to claim the provincial crown for the first time in thirty-nine years.

Waterford set out to defend their Munster title and build on their success in 2003. Cork, however, had other ideas. In that game Mullane became one of the very few players to have scored a hat-trick of goals in a Munster hurling final, however, Waterford still lost the match. His side were later defeated by Wexford in the All-Ireland qualifiers. In spite of a disappointing season, Mullane won his first All Star award.

2004 saw Waterford qualify for a third successive Munster final with Cork providing the opposition once again. Described as the game that had everything Waterford beat Cork by 3–16 to 1–21 to win one of the greatest games of hurling ever played. The game was not without incident for Mullane. Only a few minutes into the second half of the game the referee noticed an "off the ball incident" between Cork's Brian Murphy and Mullane. After consultation with the linesman, the referee decided to send off Mullane. This was deemed to be the pivotal moment in the match. The subsequent All-Ireland semi-final saw Waterford take on a wounded Kilkenny team. In spite of this 'the Cats' were the winners by 3–12 to 0–18.

The following two years brought little success for Mullane and Waterford. In 2005 and 2006 they reached the All-Ireland knock-out series, however, they were beaten on both occasions by Cork.

In 2007 Mullane added a National Hurling League medal to his collection when Waterford defeated Kilkenny by 0–20 to 0–18 in the final. He later claimed a third Munster winners' medal as Waterford defeated Limerick by 3–17 to 1–14 in the provincial decider. While Waterford were viewed as possibly going on and winning the All-Ireland title for the first time in almost half a century, Limerick ambushed Mullane's side in the All-Ireland semi-final. Mullane himself was largely disappointing in this game having had a virus for several weeks leading up to the game.

2008 began poorly for Waterford as the team lost their opening game to Clare as well as their manager Justin McCarthy. In spite of this poor start Mullane's side reached the All-Ireland final for the first time in forty-five years. Kilkenny provided the opposition and went on to trounce Waterford by 3–30 to 1–13 to claim a third All-Ireland title in-a-row.

In spite of another disappointing season in 2009, Mullane finished off the year by collecting a second All Star award.

Mullane lined out in another Munster final in 2010 with Cork providing the opposition. A 2–15 apiece draw was the result on that occasion, however, Waterford went on to win the replay after an extra-time goal by Dan Shanahan. It was a fourth Munster winners' medal for Mullane, a record that he shares with five other Waterford players. He later collected a third All Star award.

Waterford faced back-to-back defeats by Tipperary in the Munster finals if 2011 and 2012. In spite of these disappointments Mullane collected his fourth and fifth All Star awards.

In January 2013 Mullane announced his retirement from inter county hurling declaring that

I just felt in the end that mentally it just broke me – I had enough. Physically I feel I could have gone on for another year or two, but mentally I'd had enough.

=== Inter-provincial ===
Mullane has also lined out with Munster in the inter-provincial hurling championship on a number of occasions. He was captain of the side in 2007 when he won his sole Railway Cup medal following a 2–22 to 2–19 defeat of Connacht.

== Television and Radio ==
In 2014, Mullane made appearances on RTÉ2's 3rd season of Second Captains Live. Each week Mullane presented a modern-day version of "The Skills of Hurling", a show from the late 1970s which featured a young Brian Cody and other players from that era. Some of the 'skills' Mullane included were, 'Celebrating Winning a Free', 'The Shoulder Welcome', 'The Championship Haircut' and 'The Tunnel Sprint'.

Since 2017 he has been co commentating major hurling matches on RTÉ Radio 1.

== Career statistics ==
=== Club ===
Team	Year	Munster		All-Ireland		Total	
Team	Year	Apps	Score	Apps	Score	Apps	Score
De La Salle	2008-09	2	1-07	2	0-06	4	1-13
De La Salle	2010-11	2	0-10	1	0-11	3	0-21
De La Salle	2012-13	2	0-03	0	0-00	2	0-03
Total		6	1-20	3	0-17	9	1-37

=== Inter-county ===
Team	Year	National League			Championship		Total	
Team	Year	Division	Apps	Score	Apps	Score	Apps	Score
Waterford	2001	Division 1B	6	1-11	1	0-01	7	1-12
Waterford	2002	Division 1A	4	0-01	3	0-06	7	0-07
Waterford	2003	Division 1A	1	0-03	3	4-07	4	4-10
Waterford	2004	Division 1A	9	1-23	3	1-06	12	2-29
Waterford	2005	Division 1A	8	2-17	5	1-15	13	3-32
Waterford	2006	Division 1A	6	1-14	6	2-17	12	3-31
Waterford	2007	Division 1A	6	1-12	5	1-11	11	2-23
Waterford	2008	Division 1A	6	3-13	5	2-21	11	5-34
Waterford	2009	Division 1	2	0-06	5	1-17	7	1-23
Waterford	2010	Division 1	5	0-09	4	0-13	9	0-22
Waterford	2011	Division 1	2	0-04	4	3-12	6	3-16
Waterford	2012	Division 1A	2	0-04	3	0-08	5	0-12
Total			57	9-117	47	15-134	104	24-251

== Honours ==
=== Team ===
De La Salle

- Munster Senior Club Hurling Championship (2): 2008 (c), 2010
- Waterford Senior Club Hurling Championship (3): 2008 (c), 2010, 2012

Waterford

- Munster Senior Hurling Championship (4): 2002, 2004, 2007, 2010
- National Hurling League (1): 2007

Munster

- Inter-provincial Championship (1): 2007(c)

=== Individual ===
- All Stars (5): 2003, 2009, 2010, 2011, 2012

== In popular culture ==
A John Mullane flag was spotted flying at Glastonbury Music Festival 2025. Captioned "I Love me Flag".

Sporting positions
Preceded by Eddie Brennan (Leinster)	Interprovincial Hurling Final winning captain 2007	Succeeded by Tommy Walsh (Leinster)
