= 2024 Tipperary Senior Hurling Championship =

Annual hurling competition season

- Dates: 26 July 2024 - 13 October 2024
- Teams: 16
- Sponsor: FBD Insurance
- Champions: Loughmore–Castleiney (5th title); Liam McGrath (captain); Éamonn Kelly (manager)
- Runners-up: Toomevara; Liam Ryan (captain); Ken Dunne (manager)
- Relegated: Templederry Kenyons

Tournament statistics
- Matches played: 31
- Goals scored: 114 (3.68 per match)
- Points scored: 1248 (40.26 per match)
- Top scorer(s): Darragh McCarthy (3-62)

The 2024 Tipperary Senior Hurling Championship was the 133rd staging of the Tipperary Senior Hurling Championship since its establishment by the Tipperary County Board in 1887.

The defending champions were Kiladangan but they were eliminated at the quarter-final stage by Moycarkey–Borris. The championship was won by Loughmore–Castleiney for the fifth time in their history after they defeated Toomevara in the final by 2-19 to 1-17. (Note: Loughmore-Castleiney also won the 2024 Tipperary Senior Football Championship to win a second "double" in five seasons.)

== Team changes ==
=== To Championship ===
Promoted from the Tipperary Premier Intermediate Hurling Championship

- Lorrha–Dorrha

=== From Championship ===
Relegated to the Tipperary Premier Intermediate Hurling Championship

- Upperchurch–Drombane

== Divisional championship finals ==
Division	Winner	Score	Runner-up	Score	Ref
Mid	Loughmore–Castleiney	1-25	Moycarkey–Borris	1-16	
North	Kiladangan	1-22	Toomevara	1-19	
South	Carrick Swans	3-19	Killenaule	1-16	
West	No Championship				

== Group stage ==
The draw for the group stage took place on 22 April 2024. The original draw was completed on 18 April but due to an administrative error where Lorrha–Dorrha were drawn out as a second seed, when a third seed, the Competitions Control Committee of Tipperary ruled that draw null and void and ordered a re-draw.

Advance to quarter-finals Advance to relegation semi-final

=== Group 1 ===
Team	Matches				Score			Pts
Team	Pld	W	D	L	For	Against	Diff	Pts
Toomevara	3	2	0	1	3-62	3-55	+7	4
Kilruane MacDonaghs	3	2	0	1	6-57	4-62	+1	4
Drom & Inch	3	1	0	2	2-71	7-63	-7	2
Borris–Ileigh	3	1	0	2	4-53	1-63	-1	2

==== Results ====
27 July 2024 Round 1	Toomevara	0-18 – 1-17	Borris–Ileigh	Dolla
19:15	Darragh McCarthy 0-10 (8f, 1 65'), Mark McCarthy and Jake Hackett 0-2 each, Josh McCarthy, Kevin McCarthy, Darren Delaney and Adam Hall 0-1 each	Report	Eddie Ryan 0-8 (7f), James Devaney 1-2, Kieran Maher 0-2, Colm Boyle, Dan McCormack, Kevin Maher, Paddy McCormack and Tom Delaney 0-1 each	Referee: Alan Tierney

27 July 2024 Round 1	Drom & Inch	1-25 – 4-20	Kilruane MacDonaghs	Templederry
19:15	Séamus Callanan 1-9 (0-8f), Cormac Fitzpatrick 0-5 (2f), Tommy Nolan 0-3, Podge Campion 0-2, Lorcan Campion, John Campion, Tony Cahill, David Collins, David Butler and Maidhc Fitzpatrick 0-1 each	Report	Willie Cleary 0-13 (11f), Thomas Cleary 1-2, Kian O'Kelly and Cian Darcy 1-1 each, Jerome Cahill 1-0, Aaron Morgan, Niall O'Meara and Sean MacAdams 0-1 each	Referee: Tom McGlinchey

9 August 2024 Round 2	Borris–Ileigh	1-17 – 1-18	Kilruane MacDonaghs	Dolla
19:15	Eddie Ryan 1-8 (1-0p, 0-7f, 0-1 65'), Dan McCormack 0-3, Kieran Maher and Conor Kenny 0-2 each, Colm Boyle and Brendan Maher 0-1 each	Report	Willie Cleary 0-8 (7f), Niall O'Meara 1-0, Thomas Cleary 0-3, Cian Darcy 0-2, James Cleary, Craig Morgan, Jerome Cahill, Conor Austin and Sean McAdams 0-1 each	Referee: John Dooley

10 August 2024 Round 2	Drom & Inch	1-19 – 1-24	Toomevara	Borrisoleigh
15:45	Maidhc Fitzpatrick 1-2, Séamus Callanan 0-5 (5f), Podge Campion, Fintan Purcell, David Collins, Cormac Fitzpatrick and Johnny Ryan 0-2 each, Jack Ryan and Tony Cahill 0-1 each	Report	Darragh McCarthy 0-12 (7f, 1 65'), Adam Hall 1-1, Conor O'Farrell and Jack Delaney 0-3 each, Mark McCarthy 0-2, Robbie Quirke, Kevin McCarthy and Jake Hackett 0-1 each	Referee: Michael Kennedy

24 August 2024 Round 3	Kilruane MacDonaghs	1-19 – 2-20	Toomevara	MacDonagh Park
15:45	Willie Cleary 0-12 (9f, 2 65'), Cian Darcy 1-2, Niall O'Meara 0-2, Eoin Hogan, Kian O'Kelly and Thomas Cleary 0-1 each	Report	Darragh McCarthy 1-12 (1-0p, 0-9f, 0-1 65'), Adam Hall 1-0, Kevin McCarthy 0-3, Josh McCarthy, Conor O'Farrell, Darren Delaney, Mark McCarthy (1 sl) and Conor O'Meara 0-1 each	Referee: Conor Doyle

24 August 2024 Round 3	Borris–Ileigh	2-19 – 0-27	Drom & Inch	Holycross
15:45	Eddie Ryan 0-11 (9f), Paddy McCormack 2-0, Tom Delaney, James Devaney and Conor Kenny 0-2 each, Tommy Maher and Kieran Maher 0-1 each	Report	Séamus Callanan 0-13 (8f), Johnny Ryan and David Collins 0-3 each, Cormac Fitzpatrick and Tommy Nolan 0-2 each, Podge Campion, John Campion, Cormac Cahill and Maidhc Fitzpatrick 0-1 each	Referee: Fergal Horgan

=== Group 2 ===
Team	Matches				Score			Pts
Team	Pld	W	D	L	For	Against	Diff	Pts
Thurles Sarsfields	3	3	0	0	5-77	4-46	+34	6
Moycarkey–Borris	3	2	0	1	7-57	9-43	+8	4
Mullinahone	3	1	0	2	4-56	4-68	-12	2
Roscrea	3	0	0	3	7-46	6-79	-30	0

==== Results ====
27 July 2024 Round 1	Moycarkey–Borris	3-25 – 4-12	Roscrea	Templemore
19:15	Kyle Shelly 2-9, Max Hackett 1-4, Jack Hayes 0-3, Rhys Shelly, Jack Fallon and Joe Maher 0-2 each, Pat Molloy, Kieran Cummins and Bill Flanagan 0-1 each	Report	Alan Tynan, Evan Fitzpatrick and Sam Dooley 1-1 each, Daryl Ryan 1-0, Luke Cashin 0-3, Kenny Lee 0-2, Glen Loughnane, Owen Tynan, Conor Booth and Conor Sheedy 0-1 each	Referee: Sean Everard

28 July 2024 Round 1	Thurles Sarsfields	0-29 – 1-19	Mullinahone	Cashel
19:30	Conor Stakelum (1f) and Aidan McCormack (6f) 0-8 each, Eoin Purcell 0-3, Ronan Maher (2f) and Seanie Butler 0-2 each, Denis Maher, Stephen Maher, James Armstrong, Stephen Cahill, Darragh Stakelum and Liam McCormack 0-1 each	Report	Jack Shelly 0-4 (2f), Kevin Bolger 1-0, Martin Kehoe, Seán Curran and Michael Dunne (3f) 0-3 each, Eanna Ryan and Eoin O'Dwyer 0-2 each, Darragh Linnane and Sam Rowan 0-1 each	Referee: Conor Doyle

10 August 2024 Round 2	Moycarkey–Borris	2-13 – 3-20	Thurles Sarsfields	Templemore
18:30	Rhys Shelly 2-0 (2-0f) Kieran Morris 0-6 (4f, 1 65'), Kyle Shelly 0-3 (2f), Joe Maher and Jack Fallon 0-2 each	Report	Aidan McCormack 0-13 (6f, 1 65'), Conor Stakelum 1-1, Mossie McCormack and Darragh Stakelum 1-0 each, James Armstrong, Cian Stakelum, Stephen Cahill, Seanie Butler, Eoin Purcell and Jack Lanigan 0-1 each	Referee: Alan Tierney

10 August 2024 Round 2	Mullinahone	1-26 – 2-20	Roscrea	Holycross
18:30	Seán Curran 0-9 (4f, 1 65'), Michael Dunne 0-8 (3f), Eoin Kelly 1-0 (p), Enda Keane 0-2, Jack Shelly, Darragh Linnane, Danny Dunne, Eoin Doyle, Martin Kehoe, Eanna Ryan and Kevin Walzer 0-1 each	Report	Luke Cashin 0-10 (8f, 1 65'), Shane Fletcher and Alan Tynan 1-2 each, Conor Sheedy 0-2 (1f), Conor Dooley, Evan Fitzpatrick, Kenny Lee and Darragh Tynan 0-1 each	Referee: Fergal Horgan

25 August 2024 Round 3	Thurles Sarsfields	2-28 – 1-14	Roscrea	Templemore
15:45	Aidan McCormack 0-12 (7f), Jack Lanigan 1-1, Paddy Creedon 1-0, Stephen Maher, Stephen Cahill, Conor Stakelum, Eoin Purcell, Mossie McCormack and Darragh Stakelum 0-2 each, Ronan Maher (1f) and Liam McCormack 0-1 each	Report	Sam Dooley 1-1, Alan Tynan 0-3, Conor Sheedy, Luke Cashin (1f) and Shane Fletcher 0-2 each, Darragh Tynan, Evan Fitzpatrick, Kenny Lee and Conor Dooley 0-1 each	Referee: Ciaran O'Donovan

25 August 2024 Round 3	Mullinahone	2-11 – 2-19	Moycarkey–Borris	Cashel
15:45	Michael Dunne 0-6 (4f), Enda Keane 1-1, Eanna Ryan 1-0, Jack Shelly 0-2, Eoin Kelly (1f) and Seán Curran (1 65') 0-1 each	Report	Max Hackett 2-1, Kieran Morris 0-5 (4f), Jack Fallon and Bill Flanagan 0-3 each, Rhys Shelly (1f) and Jack Hayes 0-2 each, Stephen Walsh, Joe Maher and Joey Doran 0-1 each	Referee: Joe Leahy

=== Group 3 ===
Team	Matches				Score			Pts
Team	Pld	W	D	L	For	Against	Diff	Pts
Loughmore–Castleiney	3	3	0	0	6-62	2-53	+21	6
Nenagh Éire Óg	3	1	0	2	8-69	5-51	+27	2
Holycross–Ballycahill	3	1	0	2	2-61	5-56	-4	2
Lorrha–Dorrha	3	1	0	2	9-40	13-72	-44	2

==== Results ====
26 July 2024 Round 1	Loughmore–Castleiney	4-21 – 1-17	Lorrha–Dorrha	MacDonagh Park
19:30	John McGrath 0-7 (3f, 1 65'), Liam Treacy and Liam McGrath 1-2 each, Ciaran McGrath 1-1, Tommy Maher 1-0, Noel McGrath and Ciaran McCormack 0-3 each, Ciaran Connolly 0-2, Tomas McGrath 0-1	Report	Colm Fogarty 0-8 (7f), Eoin McIntyre 1-2, Niall McIntyre 0-3, Conor Kennedy 0-2, Michael Dolan and Christopher Fogarty 0-1 each	Referee: Peter Carroll

28 July 2024 Round 1	Nenagh Éire Óg	0-19 – 0-24	Holycross–Ballycahill	The Ragg
13:00	Mikey Heffernan 0-8 (4f), Jake Morris 0-7 (1f), Mason Cawley, Josh Keller, Conor Hennessy and Killian Malone 0-1 each	Report	Darragh Woods 0-5 (3f), Robbie Ryan 0-4, Bryan O'Mara and James Doyle 0-3 each, Ewan Bourke (2f) and Cathal Barrett 0-2 each, Joe Caesar, Eoin Craddock, Tadhg Gould, Ben Hennessy and David Fogarty 0-1 each	Referee: Joe Leahy

10 August 2024 Round 2	Lorrha–Dorrha	3-7 – 7-28	Nenagh Éire Óg	Cloughjordan
19:15	Colm Fogarty 0-6 (6f), Niall McIntyre, Eoin McIntyre and Patrick Maher 1-0 each, Alan O'Meara 0-1	Report	Jake Morris 4-5, Mikey Heffernan 1-9 (0-7f), Ben West 1-2, Philip Hickey 1-1, Jamie Cottrell 0-3 (2f), Sam O'Farrell and Tommy Heffernan 0-2 each, Barry Heffernan, Mason Cawley, James Mackey and Conor Hennessy 0-1 each	Referee: Gerry Treacy

11 August 2024 Round 2	Holycross–Ballycahill	0-14 – 0-21	Loughmore–Castleiney	The Ragg
16:30	Darragh Woods 0-5 (5f), Robbie Ryan 0-4, James Doyle 0-2, Tadhg Gould and Cathal Barrett 0-1 each	Report	John McGrath 0-9 (8f), Ciaran Connolly 0-4, John Ryan 0-2, Brian McGrath, Tomas McGrath, Noel McGrath, Ciaran McCormack 0-1 (1 sl), Ciaran McGrath and Liam McGrath 0-1 each	Referee: Sean Lonergan

25 August 2024 Round 3	Loughmore–Castleiney	2-20 – 1-22	Nenagh Éire Óg	Borrisoleigh
16:00	John McGrath 0-9 (8f), Ed Connolly 1-1, Ciaran McCormack 1-0, Tomas McGrath, Ciaran Connolly, Noel McGrath and Ciaran McGrath 0-2 each, Tommy Maher and Liam McGrath 0-1 each	Report	Mikey Heffernan 0-8 (7f), Jake Morris 1-3 (1-0p, 0-1f), Tommy Heffernan 0-5, Sam O'Farrell 0-3, Mason Cawley, Ben West and Adam Healy 0-1 each	Referee: Alan Tierney

25 August 2024 Round 3	Holycross–Ballycahill	2-23 – 5-16	Lorrha–Dorrha	Templederry
16:00	Darragh Woods 2-10 (0-5f), Robbie Ryan 0-3, Cathal Barrett 0-2, Jim Ryan, Bryan O'Mara, Liam Doyle, Tadhg Gould, Eoin Craddock, Paraic Russell, David Fogarty and James Doyle 0-1 each	Report	Colm Fogarty 0-11 (7f, 1 65'), Eoin McIntyre 2-2, Cian Hogan, Christopher Fogarty and Patrick Maher 1-0 each, Conor Kennedy 0-2, Niall McIntyre 0-1	Referee: Sean Everard

=== Group 4 ===
Team	Matches				Score			Pts
Team	Pld	W	D	L	For	Against	Diff	Pts
Kiladangan	3	2	1	0	10-81	6-53	+40	5
JK Brackens	3	2	0	1	8-68	9-64	+1	4
Clonoulty–Rossmore	3	1	1	1	11-57	7-66	+3	3
Templederry Kenyons	3	0	0	3	6-57	13-80	-44	0

==== Results ====
27 July 2024 Round 1	Templederry Kenyons	3-20 – 6-26	JK Brackens	Borrisoleigh
14:00	Sean Ryan 2-5, Brian Stapleton 1-2, Colm Murray 0-5 (4f), Padraic O'Leary and Mikie Ryan 0-2 each, Padraig Hogan, Darragh Carey, Gearóid Ryan and Liam McCutcheon 0-1 each	Report	Lyndon Fairbrother 1-9 (0-6f, 0-1 65'), Jamie Ormond 1-5, Ned Walsh 2-1, Eanna McBride 1-4, Shane Doyle 0-5, Michael Cahill 1-1, Paddy Cadell 0-1	Referee: Kevin Jordan

27 July 2024 Round 1	Clonoulty–Rossmore	4-20 – 4-20	Kiladangan	Borrisoleigh
15:45	Stephen Ferncombe 1-9 (0-7f), Cathal Bourke 1-4, Danny Slattery 1-3, Robert Doyle 1-1, Nathan Slattery, Michael Ryan (W) and Jack Ryan 0-1 each	Report	Billy Seymour 1-10 (1-5f, 0-1 65'), Paul Flynn 1-2, Bryan McLoughney 1-1, Darren Moran 1-0, Shane Gleeson and Andy Loughnane 0-2 each, David Sweeney, Willie Connors and Conor Byrne 0-1 each	Referee: Michael Kennedy

10 August 2024 Round 2	Clonoulty–Rossmore	4-14 – 2-26	JK Brackens	Borrisoleigh
14:00	Jack Ryan 3-0 (2-0f), Stephen Ferncombe 0-5 (4f), Jimmy Maher 1-1, Cathal Bourke 0-3 (1f), Sean O'Connor, Nathan Slattery, Danny Slattery, Michael Ryan (W) and Robert Doyle 0-1 each	Report	Lyndon Fairbrother 2-10 (0-8f), Andrew Ormond and Jamie Ormond 0-4 each, Paddy Cadell, Shane Doyle 0-2 (1 sl) and Michael Cahill 0-2 each, Eanna McBride and Conor Cadell 0-1 each	Referee: Ciaran O'Donovan

11 August 2024 Round 2	Kiladangan	4-31 – 2-17	Templederry Kenyons	MacDonagh Park
15:15	Billy Seymour 1-13 (0-6f), Paul Flynn 2-4, Conor Byrne 1-3, Alan Flynn 0-4, Shane Gleeson and Bryan McLoughney 0-2 each, James Quigley, Willie Connors and Andy Loughnane 0-1 each	Report	Colm Murray 1-8 (5f, 1 65'), Eanna Murray 0-5, Sean Ryan 1-1, Gearóid Ryan 0-2, Liam McCutcheon 0-1	Referee: Conor Doyle

25 August 2024 Round 3	Kiladangan	2-30 – 0-16	JK Brackens	Dolla
13:00	Paul Flynn 1-8, Billy Seymour 0-8 (3f, 1 sl), Alan Flynn 0-5, Bryan McLoughney 1-1, Willie Connors, Shane Gleeson and Andy Loughnane 0-2 each, Tadhg Gallagher and Conor Byrne 0-1 each	Report	Jamie Ormond and Lyndon Fairbrother (5f) 0-6 each, Andrew Ormond 0-2, Ned Walsh and Shane Doyle (1 sl) 0-1 each	Referee: Kevin Jordan

25 August 2024 Round 3	Clonoulty–Rossmore	3-23 – 1-20	Templederry Kenyons	The Ragg
13:00	Stephen Ferncombe 1-8 (0-7f), Robert Doyle 2-1, Cathal Bourke and Michael Ryan (W) 0-4 each, Jack Ryan 0-3, Enda Heffernan, Danny Slattery and Thomas Butler 0-1 each	Report	Colm Murray 0-9 (7f), Sean Ryan 0-6 (5f), Padraic O'Leary 1-0, Eanna Murray 0-3, Gearóid Ryan 0-2	Referee: Peter Carroll

== Relegation ==
=== Relegation semi-finals ===
14 September 2024 Relegation Semi-Final	Borris–Ileigh	2-19 – 1-18	Lorrha–Dorrha	MacDonagh Park
14:30	Eddie Ryan 0-11 (9f), Paddy McCormack and James Devaney 1-1 each, Conor Kenny 0-3, Kevin Maher 0-2, Tom Delaney 0-1	Report	Colm Fogarty 0-10 (7f), Cian Hogan 1-0, Michael Dolan (3f) and Eoin McIntyre 0-3 each, Conor Kennedy 0-2	Referee: Ciaran O'Donovan

14 September 2024 Relegation Semi-Final	Templederry Kenyons	2-15 – 5-22	Roscrea	MacDonagh Park
16:15	Sean Ryan 1-4, Colm Murray 0-4 (4f), Michael Hayes 1-0, Gearóid Ryan 0-3, Padraic O'Leary 0-2, Eanna Murray and Conor Looby 0-1 each	Report	Alan Tynan 2-5, Sam Dooley 2-0, Evan Fitzpatrick and Luke Cashin (4f) 0-5 each, Leigh Loughnane 1-0, Kenny Lee and Shane Fletcher 0-2 each, Darragh Tynan, Conor Dooley and Conor Booth 0-1 each	Referee: Joe Leahy

=== Relegation Final ===
29 September 2024 Relegation Final	Lorrha–Dorrha	1-18 – 1-15	Templederry Kenyons	MacDonagh Park
15:15				Referee: Sean Everard

== Knockout stage ==
=== Bracket ===
Quarter-finals
14 September, Semple Stadium
Kiladangan	3-16
Moycarkey–Borris	2-21
14 September, Semple Stadium
Toomevara	0-26
JK Brackens	0-21
15 September, Semple Stadium
Loughmore–Castleiney	2-22
Kilruane MacDonaghs	1-19
15 September, Semple Stadium
Thurles Sarsfields	0-29
Nenagh Éire Óg	1-19

Semi-finals
28 September, Semple Stadium
Moycarkey–Borris	0-20
Toomevara	2-19
29 September, Semple Stadium
Loughmore–Castleiney	0-17
Thurles Sarsfields	2-9

Final
13 October, Semple Stadium
Toomevara	1-17
Loughmore–Castleiney	2-19

=== Quarter-finals ===
14 September 2024 Quarter-Final	Kiladangan	3-16 – 2-21	Moycarkey–Borris	Semple Stadium
15:15	Billy Seymour 1-4 (0-1f), Bryan McLoughney and Conor Byrne 1-2 each, Paul Flynn 0-2, Joe Gallagher, Declan McGrath, Tadgh Gallagher, Shane Gleeson, Andy Loughnane and Seán Hayes 0-1 each	Report	Kieran Cummins and Joe Maher 0-5 each, Tom Ryan and Max Hackett 1-0 each, Steven Walsh and Kieran Morris (3f) 0-3 each, Kyle Shelly (2f) and David Costigan 0-2 each, Rhys Shelly 0-1 (1f)	Referee: Alan Tierney

14 September 2024 Quarter-Final	Toomevara	0-26 – 0-21	JK Brackens	Semple Stadium
17:00	Darragh McCarthy 0-12 (9f), Mark McCarthy 0-3, Adam Hall, Darren Delaney, Jack Delaney and Conor O' Meara 0-2 each, Josh McCarthy and Jack Ryan 0-1 each	Report	Lyndon Fairbrother 0-7 (0-6f, 0-1 65'), Jamie Ormond 0-5, Andrew Ormond and Eanna McBride 0-3 each, Shane Doyle, Michael Cahill and Barry O'Connell 0-1 each	Referee: Michael Kennedy

15 September 2024 Quarter-Final	Loughmore–Castleiney	2-22 – 1-19	Kilruane MacDonaghs	Semple Stadium
14:15	John McGrath 0-10 (7f, 1 65), Liam McGrath and Ciaran McCormack 1-1 each, Ed Connolly 0-3, Ciaran Connolly 0-2, Noel McGrath, Tommy Maher, Ed Meagher, Tomas McGrath and Liam Treacy 0-1 each	Report	Willie Cleary 1-9 (0-9f), Cian Darcy 0-3, Jerome Cahill and Aaron Morgan 0-2 each, Thomas Cleary, Niall O'Meara and Kian O'Kelly 0-1 each	Referee: Kevin Jordan
Note: Live on TG4

15 September 2024 Quarter-Final	Thurles Sarsfields	0-29 – 1-19	Nenagh Éire Óg	Semple Stadium
16:00	Stephen Cahill 0-5, Aidan McCormack (3f, 1 65), Liam McCormack and Eoin Purcell 0-4 each, Darragh Stakelum 0-3, Paddy Creedon, Pa Bourke (2f) and Conor Stakelum 0-2 each, Cathal Moloney, Seanie Butler and Michael Purcell 0-1 each	Report	Mikey Heffernan 0-8 (7f), Tommy Heffernan 0-4, Adam Healy 1-0, Sam O'Farrell 0-3, Jake Morris 0-2, Conor Ryan and Barry Heffernan 0-1 each	Referee: Conor Doyle

=== Semi-finals ===
28 September 2024 Semi-Final	Moycarkey–Borris	0-20 – 2-19	Toomevara	Semple Stadium
17:30	Kieran Morris 0-5 (3f), Kyle Shelly 0-4 (3f, 1 65'), Kieran Cummins 0-3, Joe Maher 0-2, Max Hackett, Bill Flanagan, Eoghan Hayes, Jack Hayes, Rhys Shelly (1f) and David Costigan 0-1 each	Report	Darragh McCarthy 2-7 (0-4f, 0-1 65'), Kevin McCarthy 0-5, Mark McCarthy 0-2 (1 sl), Conor O'Farrell, Adam Hall, Robbie Quirke, Jack Delaney and Darren Delaney 0-1 each	Referee: Conor Doyle

29 September 2024 Semi-Final	Loughmore–Castleiney	0-17 – 2-9	Thurles Sarsfields	Semple Stadium
16:00	John McGrath 0-12 (8f), Ed Connolly 0-2, Tomas McGrath, Ciaran Connolly and Ciaran McGrath 0-1 each	Report	Paddy Creedon 2-1, Aidan McCormack 0-3 (2f, 1 65'), Darragh Stakelum 0-2, Liam McCormack, James Armstrong and Pa Bourke 0-1 each	Referee: Michael Kennedy

=== Final ===
13 October 2024 Final	Toomevara	1-17 – 2-19	Loughmore–Castleiney	Semple Stadium
15:45	Darragh McCarthy 0-9 (8f), Conor O'Meara 1-2, Kevin McCarthy and Jack Delaney 0-2 each, Conor O'Farrell and Robbie Quirke 0-1 each	Report	John McGrath 1-13 (0-9f, 0-1 65'), Paul McCahey 1-0, Ciaran McCormack 0-2, Brian McGrath, Ciaran Connolly, Liam McGrath and Ciaran McGrath 0-1 each	Referee: Alan Tierney
Note: Live on TG4

== Championship statistics ==
=== Top scorers ===
==== Overall ====
Rank	Player	Club	Tally	Total	Matches	Average
1	Darragh McCarthy	Toomevara	3-62	71	6	11.83
2	John McGrath	Loughmore–Castleiney	1-60	63	6	10.5
3	Willie Cleary	Kilruane MacDonaghs	1-42	45	4	11.25
4	Billy Seymour	Kiladangan	3-35	44	4	11
5	Lyndon Fairbrother	JK Brackens	3-32	41	4	10.25
6	Aidan McCormack	Thurles Sarsfields	0-40	40	5	8
7	Mikey Heffernan	Nenagh Éire Óg	1-33	36	4	9
8	Jake Morris	Nenagh Éire Óg	5-17	32	4	8
9	Séamus Callanan	Drom & Inch	1-27	30	3	10
9	Eddie Ryan	Borris–Ileigh	1-27	30	3	10

==== In a single game ====
Rank	Player	Club	Tally	Total	Opposition
1	Jake Morris	Nenagh Éire Óg	4-5	17	Lorrha–Dorrha
2	Lyndon Fairbrother	JK Brackens	2-10	16	Clonoulty–Rossmore
2	Darragh Woods	Holycross–Ballycahill	2-10	16	Lorrha–Dorrha
2	Billy Seymour	Kiladangan	1-13	16	Templederry Kenyons
2	John McGrath	Loughmore–Castleiney	1-13	16	Toomevara
6	Kyle Shelly	Moycarkey–Borris	2-9	15	Roscrea
6	Darragh McCarthy	Toomevara	1-12	15	Kilruane MacDonaghs
8	Darragh McCarthy	Toomevara	2-7	13	Moycarkey–Borris
8	Billy Seymour	Kiladangan	1-10	13	Clonoulty–Rossmore
8	Séamus Callanan	Drom & Inch	0-13	13	Borris–Ileigh
8	Willie Cleary	Kilruane MacDonaghs	0-13	13	Drom & Inch
8	Aidan McCormack	Thurles Sarsfields	0-13	13	Moycarkey–Borris
