= 2023 Tipperary Senior Hurling Championship =

Annual hurling competition season

- Dates: 28 July 2023 – 29 October 2023
- Teams: 16
- Sponsor: FBD Insurance
- Champions: Kiladangan (2nd title); Alan Flynn (captain); John O'Meara (manager)
- Runners-up: Thurles Sarsfields; Ronan Maher (captain); Pádraic Maher (manager)
- Relegated: Upperchurch–Drombane

Tournament statistics
- Matches played: 34
- Goals scored: 100 (2.94 per match)
- Points scored: 1350 (39.71 per match)
- Top scorer(s): Billy Seymour (2-65)

The 2023 Tipperary Senior Hurling Championship was the 132nd staging of the Tipperary Senior Hurling Championship since its establishment by the Tipperary County Board in 1887.

The defending champions were Kilruane MacDonaghs.

On 29 October, Kiladangan defeated Thurles Sarsfields by 1–21 to 1–20 after a replay to win their second title.

== Team changes ==
=== To Championship ===
Promoted from the Tipperary Premier Intermediate Hurling Championship

- Roscrea

=== From Championship ===
Relegated to the Tipperary Premier Intermediate Hurling Championship

- Éire Óg Annacarty

== Divisional championship finals ==
Division	Winner	Score	Runner-up	Score	Ref
Mid	Thurles Sarsfields	0–18	Upperchurch-Drombane	0–16	
North	Nenagh Éire Óg	0–21	Kiladangan	0–17	
South	Killenaule	1–20	Carrick Swans	2–16	
West	Clonoulty–Rossmore	3–23	Cashel King Cormacs	1–9	

== Group stage ==
The draw for the group stage took place on 3 April 2023.

Advance to quarter-finals
Advance to preliminary-quarter-finals
Advance to relegation semi-final
Advance to preliminary-quarter-final and relegation semi-final

=== Group 1 ===
Team	Matches				Score			Pts
Team	Pld	W	D	L	For	Against	Diff	Pts
Drom & Inch	3	2	0	1	7–56	6–63	−4	4
Mullinahone	3	2	0	1	6–56	4–52	+10	4
Nenagh Éire Óg	3	1	0	2	7–51	5–55	+2	2
JK Brackens	3	1	0	2	4–54	9–47	−8	2

==== Results ====
29 July 2023 Round 1	Drom & Inch	2–19 – 1–20	Nenagh Éire Óg	Templemore
18.45	Séamus Callanan 1–6 (0-4f), Tommy Nolan 1–3, Johnny Ryan 0–3, Jamie Moloney and David Collins 0–2 each, Emmet Moloney, Maidhc Fitzpatrick and Pauric Campion 0–1 each	Report	Mikey Heffernan 0–10 (8f), Tommy Heffernan 1–5, Adam Carey 0–2, James Mackey, Josh Keller and Barry Heffernan 0–1 each	Referee: Conor Doyle

30 July 2023 Round 1	Mullinahone	2–16 – 0–15	JK Brackens	Littleton
12.30	Mikey O'Shea 2–1, Conor Whelan 0–5 (4f), Jack Shelly 0–4 (3f), Enda Keane 0–3 (1 sl), Eoin O'Dwyer 0–2, Eoin Fennelly 0–1	Report	Lyndon Fairbrother 0–8 (8f), Andrew Ormonde 0–3, Eoin Fitzpatrick 0–2, Luke Ormonde and Shane Doyle 0–1 each	Referee: John Dooley

12 August 2023 Round 2	JK Brackens	1–15 – 5–15	Nenagh Éire Óg	Dolla
13.30	Lyndon Fairbrother (0-9f, 1 65') 1–10, David O'Shea 0–2, Dean McEnroe, Shane Doyle and Andrew Ormond 0–1 each		Mikey Heffernan (0-9f) 1–10, Philip Hickey 1–1, Barry Heffernan (p), Cian Crowley and Adam Carey 1–0, Sam O'Farrell 0–2, Sean Phelan and Ben West 0–1	Referee: Kevin Jordan

12 August 2023 Round 2	Drom & Inch	3–21 – 2–19	Mullinahone	Littleton
19.00	Séamus Callanan (0-7f) 1–7, Tommy Nolan 1–3, Johnny Ryan 0–5, David Collins 1–1, Eoin Collins (1f), Lorcan Campion, John Campion, Jamie Moloney and Tony Cahill 0–1 each	Report	Mikey O'Shea 1–3, Jack Shelley (3f) 0–4, Eanna Ryan 1–0, Conor Whelan (2f), Enda Keane and Martin Kehoe 0–3 each, Seán Curran 0–2, Colin Shelley 0–1	Referee: Sean Everard

27 August 2023 Round 3	Mullinahone	2–21 – 1–16	Nenagh Éire Óg	Templetuohy
14.00	Eoin O'Dwyer 1–3, Eoin Kelly (1-0p, 0-1f) 1–1, Jack Shelly (1f, 1 65') and Mikey O'Shea 0–4 each, Sean Curran, Daire O'Brien, Michael Dunne and Enda Keane 0–2 each, Danny Dunne 0–1	Report	Ben West 1–1, Sam O'Farrell 0–4, Thomas Heffernan (3f) 0–3, Dermot McTiernan (1f), Mark O'Farrell, James Mackey, Barry Heffernan (1f), Philip Hickey, Josh Keller, Sean Phelan (1f) and Adam Healy 0–1 each	Referee: Michael Kennedy

27 August 2023 Round 3	Drom & Inch	2–16 – 3–24	JK Brackens	Templetuohy
15.45	Séamus Callanan (1-0p, 0-6f, 0–1 65') 1–8, Tommy Nolan 1–1, David Collins and John Campion 0–2 each, Eoin Collins, Maidhc Fitzpatrick and Jamie Moloney 0–1 each		Lyndon Fairbrother (9f) 0–12, Dean McEnroe 1–2, Eanna McBride 1–1, Andrew Ormond 0–4, Shane Doyle 1–0, Eoin Fitzpatrick 0–2, Neil Quinlan, Jordan Moloney and Paddy Cadell 0–1 each	Referee: Peter Carroll

=== Group 2 ===
Team	Matches				Score			Pts
Team	Pld	W	D	L	For	Against	Diff	Pts
Toomevara	3	3	0	0	5–58	1–57	+13	6
Roscrea	3	1	1	1	6–57	4–60	+3	3
Moycarkey–Borris	3	1	1	1	1–68	3–61	+1	3
Kilruane MacDonaghs	3	0	0	3	4–55	8–60	−17	0

==== Results ====
28 July 2023 Round 1	Moycarkey-Borris	0–21 – 1–18	Roscrea	Templemore
19.30	Kieran Morris 0–10 (7f, 1 65'), Rhys Shelly (2f), Kieran Cummins, Kyle Shelly and Liam Corcoran 0–2 each, Eoghan Hayes, Niall Heffernan and Jack Fallon 0–1 each	Report	Luke Cashin 1–8 (0-8f), Evan Fitzpatrick 0–4, Alan Tynan 0–3, Conor Sheedy, Kenny Lee and Conor Dooley 0–1 each	Referee: John McCormack

28 July 2023 Round 1	Toomevara	3–16 – 0–15	Kilruane MacDonaghs	MacDonagh Park
19.30	Jack Delaney 2–5 (0–1 sl), Darragh McCarthy 1–2 (0-1f), Shane Nolan (3f) 0–4, Kevin McCarthy and Colm Canning 0–2 each, David Nolan 0–1	Report	Willie Cleary 0–10 (7f, 2 65'), Jerome Cahill, Kieran Cahill, Aaron Morgan, Mark O'Neill and Thomas Cleary 0–1 each	Referee: Alan Tierney

11 August 2023 Round 2	Moycarkey-Borris	0–24 – 1–22	Toomevara	The Ragg
19.00	Kieran Morris (11f, 2 65') 0–13, Niall Heffernan, Kyle Shelly and Jack Fallon 0–2 each, Rhys Shelly, Kieran Cummins, Joe Maher, Liam Corcoran and Max Hackett 0–1 each	Report	Darragh McCarthy (0-3f) 1–7, David Nolan (3f, 1 65') 0–5, Jack Delaney 0–3, Jack Ryan, Robbie Quirke and Shane Nolan 0–2 each, Kevin McCarthy 0–1	Referee: Michael Kennedy

13 August 2023 Round 2	Kilruane MacDonaghs	3–19 – 4–21	Roscrea	MacDonagh Park
14.00	Willie Cleary (8f, 1 65') 0–9, Cian Darcy (0-1f) 2–2, Conor Cleary 1–0, Séamus Hennessy 0–3, Jerome Cahill 0–2, Mark O'Neill, James Cleary and Kian O'Kelly 0–1 each	Report	Shane Fletcher 2–3, Alan Tynan 1–3, Luke Cashin (4f) 0–6, Conor Dooley 1–0, Evan Fitzpatrick and Jason Gilmartin 0–2 each, Glen Loughnane, Darren O'Connor, Darragh Tynan, Dan Ryan and Jason Fitzpatrick 0–1 each	Referee: Gerry Treacy

26 August 2023 Round 3	Roscrea	1–18 – 1–20	Toomevara	Borrisoleigh
18.15	Luke Cashin (8f) 0–8, Alan Tynan 1–0, Dan Ryan and Evan Fitzpatrick 0–2 each, Daryl Ryan (1p), Luke Seacy, Conor Sheedy, Shane Fletcher, Conor Dooley and Sam Conlon 0–1 each	Report	Jack Delaney 1–3, Mark McCarthy (1 sl) 0–5, Kevin McCarthy, Sean Flaherty and Darragh McCarthy (3f) 0–3 each, Shane Nolan (2f) 0–2, Darren Delaney 0–1	Referee: Alan Tierney

26 August 2023 Round 3	Kilruane MacDonaghs	1–21 – 1–23	Moycarkey-Borris	Templederry
18.15	Willie Cleary (9f, 2 65') 0–12, Kian O'Kelly 1–1, Conor Austin and Séamus Hennessy 0–2 each, Aaron Morgan, Mark O'Neill, Jerome Cahill and Conor Cleary 0–1 each		Kyle Shelly 1–3, Kieran Morris (5f) and Pat Molloy 0–6 each, Kieran Cummins and Rory Ryan 0–2 each, Rhys Shelly, Eoghan Hayes, Joe Maher and Bill Flanagan 0–1 each	Referee: P J Nolan

=== Group 3 ===
Team	Matches				Score			Pts
Team	Pld	W	D	L	For	Against	Diff	Pts
Loughmore–Castleiney	3	3	0	0	7–68	7–55	+13	6
Holycross–Ballycahill	3	1	0	2	6–59	3–67	+1	2
Templederry Kenyons	3	1	0	2	6–63	6–72	−9	2
Upperchurch–Drombane	3	1	0	2	2–53	5–49	−5	2

==== Tiebreaker ====
Team	Matches				Score			Pts
Team	Pld	W	D	L	For	Against	Diff	Pts
Holycross–Ballycahill	2	1	0	1	3–39	2–40	+2	2
Templederry Kenyons	2	1	0	1	2–45	2–46	−1	2
Upperchurch–Drombane	2	1	0	1	2–36	3–34	−1	2

==== Results ====
29 July 2023 Round 1	Templederry Kenyons	4–18 – 4–26	Loughmore-Castleiney	Borrisoleigh
18.45	Colm Murray 0–7 (7f), Michael Ryan 1–1, Conor Looby, Padraig O'Leary and Pio Kennedy 1–0 each, Adrian Ryan and Sean Ryan 0–3 (2f), Eanna Murray and Michael Hayes 0–2 each	Report	John McGrath 1–8 (0-6f), Ed Connolly 2–1, Liam McGrath 0–6, Noel McGrath 0–5, Ciaran McGrath 1–0, Ed Meagher 0–2, Tomas McGrath, Philip O'Connell, Ciaran McCormack and Liam Treacy 0–1 each	Referee: Peter Carroll

30 July 2023 Round 1	Holycross-Ballycahill	2–16 – 1–13	Upperchurch-Drombane	Cashel
13.15	Joe Caesar 1–1, Darragh Woods 0–4, Luke O'Mara 1–0, Ben Hennessy 0–3, Aidan Stakelum and Cathal Barrett 0–2 each, Ewan Bourke, Mickey Jo Doyle, Jim Ryan and Eoin Craddock 0–1 each	Report	Padraig Greene 0–8, Luke Shanahan 1–2, Gavin Ryan 0–2, Paddy Phelan 0–1	Referee: Joe Leahy

12 August 2023 Round 2	Holycross-Ballycahill	3–20 – 1–27	Loughmore-Castleiney	Boherlahan
19.00	Darragh Woods (0-7f) 1–10, Cathal Barrett 1–5, Joe Caesar 1–2, Eoin Craddock, Ben Hennessy and Bryan O'Mara (f) 0–1 each		John McGrath (7f) 0–12, Ed Connolly 1–1, Liam McGrath, Ciaran McCormack and Noel McGrath 0–3 each, Ciaran McGrath and Philip O'Connell 0–2 each, Tomas McGrath 0–1	Referee: John Dooley

13 August 2023 Round 2	Templederry Kenyons	1–18 – 1–23	Upperchurch-Drombane	Semple Stadium
15.30	Colm Murray (6f, 2 65') 0–9, Sean Ryan 1–5, Adrian Ryan 0–2, Tom Stapleton and Gearóid Ryan 0–1 each		Padraig Greene (8f) 0–9, Pat Ryan 0–4, Paul Shanahan 1–0, Aaron Ryan 0–3, Gavin Ryan (2f), Luke Shanahan and Colm Ryan 0–2 each, Paddy Phelan 0–1	Referee: Alan Tierney

27 August 2023 Round 3	Loughmore-Castleiney	2–15 – 0–17	Upperchurch-Drombane	Semple Stadium
16.00	John McGrath (1-0p, 0-4f) 1–4, Liam McGrath 1–2, Ed Connolly 0–4, Noel McGrath (1 sl) 0–3, Ciaran McCormack 0–2	Report	Paidi Greene (6f) 0–10, Gavin Ryan (2f) 0–2, Ailbe O'Donoghue, Aaron Ryan, Colm Ryan, Pat Ryan and Niall Grant 0–1 each	Referee: Conor Doyle

27 August 2023 Round 3	Holycross-Ballycahill	1–23 – 1–27	Templederry Kenyons	Borrisoleigh
16.00	Darragh Woods (0-7f) 1–13, Cathal Barrett 0–3, David Fogarty 0–2, Ewan Bourke (1f), Jim Ryan, Eoin Craddock, Ben Hennessy and Luke O'Mara 0–1 each	Report	Colm Murray (10f) 0–11, Seán Ryan 0–5, Eanna Murray (1-0p) 1–1, Gearóid Ryan and Adrian Ryan 0–3 each, Odhran Murphy (1 sl) 0–2, Padraig O'Leary and Mikey Ryan 0–1 each	Referee: Sean Everard

=== Group 4 ===
Team	Matches				Score			Pts
Team	Pld	W	D	L	For	Against	Diff	Pts
Kiladangan	3	2	0	1	3–73	3–57	+16	4
Thurles Sarsfields	3	2	0	1	4–57	4–51	+6	4
Borris–Ileigh	3	1	1	1	4–47	3–61	−11	3
Clonoulty–Rossmore	3	0	1	2	1–50	2–58	−11	1

==== Results ====
30 July 2023 Round 1	Borris-Ileigh	1–13 – 0–16	Clonoulty-Rossmore	Semple Stadium
12.00	Eddie Ryan 0–9 (7f), James Devaney 1–0, Conor Kenny 0–2, Kevin Maher and Dan Ryan 0–1 each	Report	Cathal Bourke 0–12 (12f), Jack Ryan 0–3, Ronan Heffernan 0–1	Referee: Kevin Jordan

30 July 2023 Round 1	Thurles Sarsfields	1–17 – 2–23	Kiladangan	Semple Stadium
13.30	Aidan McCormack 1–6 (0-5f), Billy McCarthy and Darragh Stakelum 0–3 each, Tommy Doyle 0–2, Stephen Cahill, Conor Stakelum and Paddy Creedon 0–1 each	Report	Billy Seymour 1–8 (0-5f), Paul Flynn 0–6, Sean Hayes 1–2, Tadhg Gallagher 0–3, Alan Flynn 0–2, Joe Gallagher and Bryan McLoughney 0–1 each	Referee: Michael Kennedy

13 August 2023 Round 2	Borris-Ileigh	2–23 – 1–25	Kiladangan	MacDonagh Park
15.30	Eddie Ryan (9f) 0–11, James Devaney 0–4, Brendan Maher and Paddy McCormack 1–0 each, Tom Ryan, Dan McCormack and Conor Kenny 0–2 each, Seamus Burke and Jerry Kelly (1f)	Report	Billy Seymour (7f) 0–10, Paul Flynn 1–3, Tadhg Gallagher and Sean Hayes 0–3 each, Conor Byrne 0–2, Joe Gallagher, Alan Flynn, Dan O'Meara and Bryan McLoughney 0–1 each	Referee: Conor Doyle

13 August 2023 Round 2	Clonoulty-Rossmore	1–17 – 1–20	Thurles Sarsfields	Templemore
18.30	Cathal Bourke (0-10f) 1–12, Robert Doyle 0–2, Jimmy Maher, Jack Ryan and Stephen Quinn 0–1 each		Darragh Stakelum 1–3, Aidan McCormack (2f) 0–5, Paddy Creedon 0–3, Ronan Maher and Tommy Doyle 0–2 each, James Armstrong, Billy McCarthy, Stephen Cahill, Conor Lanigan and Seanie Butler 0–1 each	Referee: Peter Carroll

27 August 2023 Round 3	Borris-Ileigh	1–11 – 2–20	Thurles Sarsfields	Semple Stadium
14.15	Eddie Ryan (4f) 0–7, Dan McCormack 1–1, Paddy McCormack 0–2, Brendan Maher 0–1	Report	Darragh Stakelum and Aidan McCormack (6f) 0–6 each, Seanie Butler 1–1, Paddy Creedon 1–0, Ronan Maher (2f), Stephen Cahill and Conor Stakelum 0–2 each, Eoin Purcell 0–1	Referee: John McCormack
Note: Live on TG4

27 August 2023 Round 3	Clonoulty-Rossmore	0–17 – 0–25	Kiladangan	The Ragg
14.15	Cathal Bourke (6f) 0–7, Stephen Quinn, Danny Slattery and Stephen Ferncombe (1f) 0–2 each, Ciaran Quirke, Jack Ryan, Conor Hammersley and Robert Doyle 0–1 each	Report	Billy Seymour (3f, 1 65') 0–7, Tadhg Gallagher, Sean Hayes and Dan O'Meara 0–3 each, Paul Flynn, Bryan McLoughney and Conor Byrne 0–2 each, Jonathan Horan, Declan McGrath and Andy Loughnane 0–1 each	Referee: John Dooley

== Relegation ==
30 September 2023 Relegation Semi-Final	Clonoulty-Rossmore	1–18 – 1–15	JK Brackens	The Ragg
15.30	Cathal Bourke (5f) 0–8, Robert Doyle 1–2, Danny Slattery, Conor Hammersley and Jack Ryan (1f) 0–2 each, Stephen Quinn and Michael Ryan 0–1 each	Report	Lyndon Fairbrother 0–12 (9f), Shane Doyle 1–1, Cathal Scully and Andrew Ormond 0–1 each	Referee: Peter Carroll

1 October 2023 Relegation Semi-Final	Kilruane MacDonaghs	2–18 – 0–20	Upperchurch-Drombane	Dolla
13.00	Willie Cleary (0-6f, 0–1 65') 1–7, Séamus Hennessy 1–1, Aaron Morgan and Kieran Cahill 0–3 each, Niall O'Meara 0–2, Jerome Cahill and Cian Darcy 0–1 each	Report	Padraig Greene (8f) 0–9, Diarmuid Grant 0–3, Aaron Ryan and Luke Shanahan 0–2 each, Paddy Phelan and Pat Ryan 0–1 each	Referee: Michael Kennedy

14 October 2023 Relegation Final	JK Brackens	0–18 – 1–14	Upperchurch-Drombane	The Ragg
13.30	Lyndon Fairbrother (10f) 0–11, Conor Cadell and Andrew Ormond 0–3 each, Shane Doyle 0–1	Report	Padraig Greene (9f) 0–9, Pat Ryan 1–1, Jack Butler 0–2, Aaron Ryan and Luke Shanahan 0–1 each	Referee: Peter Carroll

== Knockout stage ==
=== Bracket ===
Preliminary Quarter-Finals; 9 & 10 September 2023
Nenagh Éire Óg	1–23
Thurles Sarsfields	1–27
Clonoulty–Rossmore	1–23
Mullinahone	1–20

Quarter-Finals; 15, 16 & 17 September 2023
Loughmore–Castleiney	2–22
Roscrea	1–24
Drom & Inch	1–12
Thurles Sarsfields	0–24
Toomevara	3–20
Clonoulty–Rossmore	1–24
Kiladangan	2–22
Holycross–Ballycahill	3–17

Semi-Finals; 30 September & 1 October 2023
Loughmore–Castleiney	2–12
Thurles Sarsfields	1–22
Toomevara	2–21
Kiladangan	2–30

Final; 15 & 29 October 2023
Thurles Sarsfields	0–22; 1-20 (R)
Kiladangan	1–19; 1-21 (R)

=== Preliminary Quarter-Finals ===
9 September 2023 Preliminary Quarter-Final	Nenagh Éire Óg	1–23 – 1–27	Thurles Sarsfields	Borrisoleigh
17.00	Mikey Heffernan (4f, 1 65') 0–9, Jake Morris (2f) 0–6, Sam O'Farrell 1–1, Cian Crowley 0–2, Conor Hennessy, Paddy Murphy, Adam Healy, Barry Heffernan and Josh Keller 0–1 each	Report	Aidan McCormack (5f) 0–6, Billy McCarthy 1–2, Seanie Butler 0–4, Eoin Purcell 0–3, James Armstrong, Ronan Maher, Darragh Stakelum and Stephen Cahill 0–2 each, Stephen Maher, Michael Purcell, Cathal Moloney and Conor Lanigan 0–1 each	Referee: Conor Doyle

10 September 2023 Preliminary Quarter-Final	Clonoulty-Rossmore	1–23 – 1–20	Mullinahone	Cashel
16.00	Cathal Bourke (5f) 0–8, Conor Hammersley 1–3, Robert Doyle 0–5, Michael Ryan (Winnie) and Stephen Ferncombe 0–2 each, Aaron Ryan (Rody), Enda Heffernan and Jack Ryan 0–1 each	Report	Jack Shelly (3f) 0–8, Mikey O'Shea 1–4, Michael Dunne 0–2, Eoin O'Dwyer, Colin Shelly, Martin Kehoe, Conor Whelan (1f), Sean Curran and Enda Keane 0–1 each	Referee: Kevin Jordan

=== Quarter-Finals ===
16 September 2023 Quarter-Final	Loughmore-Castleiney	2–22 – 1–24	Roscrea	Semple Stadium
15.30	John McGrath (0-10f) 1–13, Philip O'Connell 1–2, Ed Connolly 0–3, Ciaran Connolly 0–2, Liam McGrath and Ciaran McGrath 0–1 each	Report	Luke Cashin (7f) 0–9, Shane Fletcher 1–1, Evan Fitzpatrick 0–4, Darragh Tynan, Glen Loughnane and James Synott 0–2 each, Dan Ryan, Alan Tynan, Kenny Lee and Keith McMahon 0–1 each	Referee: Peter Carroll

16 September 2023 Quarter-Final	Kiladangan	2–22 – 3–17	Holycross-Ballycahill	Semple Stadium
17.15	Billy Seymour (0-5f) 1–10, Bryan McLoughney 1–1, Andy Loughnane and Sean Hayes 0–3 each, Paul Flynn and Alan Flynn 0–2 each, Declan McGrath 0–1	Report	Darragh Woods (5f) 0–10, Cathal Barrett (1-0p) 1–3, David Fogarty 1–1, Jimmy Lahart 1–0, Joe Caesar 0–2, Ben Hennessy 0–1	Referee: John McCormack

17 September 2023 Quarter-Final	Toomevara	3–20 – 1–24 (aet)	Clonoulty-Rossmore	Semple Stadium
14.00	Darragh McCarthy (10f) 0–12, Adam Hall 2–3, Aidan White 1–0, Shane Nolan (2f) and Mark McCarthy 0–2 each, Kevin McCarthy 0–1	Report	Cathal Bourke (6f) 0–10, Michael Ryan (Winnie) 0–6, Conor Hammersley 1–2, Jack Ryan 0–2, Ronan Heffernan, Robert Doyle, James Ryan and John O'Keeffe 0–1 each	Referee: Joe Leahy

17 September 2023 Quarter-Final	Drom & Inch	1–12 – 0–24	Thurles Sarsfields	Semple Stadium
15.45	Séamus Callanan (3f) 0–5, Tony Cahill 1–0, Robbie Long 0–2, David Collins, Fintan Purcell, Pauric Campion, John Campion and Jack Lillis 0–1 each	Report	Aidan McCormack (4f) 0–6, Stephen Cahill 0–5, Conor Stakelum (2f) 0–4, Ronan Maher (1f) 0–2, Denis Maher, Cathal Moloney, Billy McCarthy, Seanie Butler, Stephen Maher, Tommy Doyle and Darragh Stakelum 0–1 each	Referee: Michael Kennedy

=== Semi-Finals ===
30 September 2023 Semi-Final	Loughmore-Castleiney	2–12 – 1–22	Thurles Sarsfields	Semple Stadium
19.15	John McGrath (1-0p, 0-6f) 1–6, Ciaran McCormack 1–1, Liam McGrath 0–2, Lorcan Egan, Ciaran Connolly and Noel McGrath 0–1 each	Report	Aidan McCormack (0-4f) 1–6, Darragh Stakelum 0–6, Stephen Cahill 0–3, Conor Stakelum and Ronan Maher 0–2 each, James Armstrong, Eoin Purcell and Cathal Moloney 0–1 each	Referee: Alan Tierney
Note: Live on RTÉ2

1 October 2023 Semi-Final	Kiladangan	2–30 – 2–21	Toomevara	Semple Stadium
15.30	Billy Seymour (8f) 0–14, Paul Flynn 1–3, Bryan McLoughney 1–2, Tadgh Gallagher 0–3, Sean Hayes and Dan O'Meara 0–2 each, Conor Byrne, Darragh Egan (1f), Alan Flynn and Declan McGrath 0–1 each	Report	Darragh McCarthy (6f, 1 65') 0–11, Mark McCarthy 2–1, Kevin McCarthy 0–3, Jack Delaney and Joey McLoughney 0–2 each, Josh McCarthy and Robbie Quirke 0–1 each	Referee: Johnny Dooley

=== Final ===
15 October 2023 Final	Thurles Sarsfields	0–22 – 1–19	Kiladangan	Semple Stadium
16.00	Aidan McCormack (9f) 0–11, Darragh Stakelum and Stephen Cahill 0–3, Conor Stakelum 0–2, Billy McCarthy, Eoin Purcell and Seanie Butler 0–1 each	Report	Billy Seymour (6f) 0–7, Paul Flynn 1–3, Sean Hayes 0–3, Joe Gallagher, Declan McGrath, Alan Flynn, Dan O'Meara, Andy Loughnane and Willie Connors 0–1 each	Referee: Michael Kennedy
Note: Live on TG4

29 October 2023 Final Replay	Thurles Sarsfields	1–20 – 1–21	Kiladangan	Semple Stadium
15.00	Aidan McCormack (9f) 0–13, Paddy Creedon 1-3, Darragh Stakelum and Ronan Maher (2f) 0-2 each	Report	Billy Seymour (6f) 0-9, Sean Hayes 1-1, Willie Connors and Tadhg Gallagher 0-3 each, Declan McGrath 0-2, Joe Gallagher, Dan O'Meara and Paul Flynn 0-1 each	Referee: John McCormack
Note: Live on TG4

== Championship statistics ==
=== Top scorers ===
==== Overall ====
Rank	Player	Club	Tally	Total	Matches	Average
1	Billy Seymour	Kiladangan	2–65	71	7	10.14
2	Aidan McCormack	Thurles Sarsfields	2–59	65	8	8.13
3	John McGrath	Loughmore-Castleiney	4–43	55	5	11
4	Cathal Bourke	Clonoulty–Rossmore	1–49	52	5	10.4
5	Darragh Woods	Holycross-Ballycahill	2–37	43	4	10.75
6	Darragh McCarthy	Toomevara	2–35	41	5	8.2
7	Séamus Callanan	Drom & Inch	3–26	35	4	8.75
8	Luke Cashin	Roscrea	1–31	34	4	8.5
9	Lyndon Fairbrother	JK Brackens	1–30	33	3	11
10	Mikey Heffernan	Nenagh Éire Óg	1–29	32	3	10.67

==== In a single game ====
Rank	Player	Club	Tally	Total	Opposition
1	Darragh Woods	Holycross-Ballycahill	1–13	16	Templederry Kenyons
1	John McGrath	Loughmore-Castleiney	1–13	16	Roscrea
3	Cathal Bourke	Clonoulty-Rossmore	1–12	15	Thurles Sarsfields
4	Billy Seymour	Kiladangan	0–14	14	Thurles Sarsfields
5	Kieran Morris	Moycarkey-Borris	0–13	13	Toomevara
5	Aidan McCormack	Thurles Sarsfields	0–13	13	Kiladangan
5	Lyndon Fairbrother	JK Brackens	1–10	13	Nenagh Éire Óg
5	Mikey Heffernan	Nenagh Éire Óg	1–10	13	JK Brackens
5	Darragh Woods	Holycross-Ballycahill	1–10	13	Loughmore-Castleiney
5	Billy Seymour	Kiladangan	1–10	13	Holycross-Ballycahill
