= Alan Flynn =

Irish hurler

Personal information
- Native name: Ailéin Ó Floinn (Irish)
- Born: 28 September 1994 (age 32) Puckane, County Tipperary, Ireland

Sport
- Sport: Hurling
- Position: Left corner-back
Club
- Years: Club
- Kildangan
Club titles
- Tipperary titles: 1
College
- Years: College
- Mary Immaculate College
College titles
- Fitzgibbon titles: 1
Inter-county*
Years	County	Apps (scores)
2017–present	Tipperary	18 (0-07)
Inter-county titles
- Munster titles: 0
- All-Irelands: 1
- NHL: 0
- All Stars: 0
- *Inter County team apps and scores correct as of match played 19 May 2022.

Alan Flynn (28 September 1994) is an Irish hurler who plays for Tipperary Senior Championship club Kiladangan and at inter-county level with the Tipperary senior hurling team since 2017. He usually lines out as a left corner-back. Flynn is the brother of fellow Tipperary hurler Paul Flynn.

== Career statistics ==
As of match played 19 May 2022:

Team	Year	National League			Munster		All-Ireland		Total	
Team	Year	Division	Apps	Score	Apps	Score	Apps	Score	Apps	Score
Tipperary	2017	Division 1A	2	0-00	1	0-00	—		3	0-00
Tipperary	2018	Division 1A	7	0-02	2	0-00	—		9	0-02
Tipperary	2019	Division 1A	6	0-01	3	0-00	2	0-01	11	0-02
Tipperary	2020	Division 1A	5	0-03	1	0-01	2	0-02	8	0-06
Tipperary	2021	Division 1A	5	0-03	2	0-02	1	0-00	8	0-05
Tipperary	2022	Division 1A	4	0-00	4	0-01	—		8	0-01
Total			29	0-09	13	0-04	5	0-03	47	0-16

== Honours ==
Tipperary

- All-Ireland Senior Hurling Championship (1): 2019

Kildangan

- Tipperary Senior Hurling Championship (2): 2020,2023
