= Willie Connors =

Irish hurler

Personal information
- Native name: Liam Ó Conchúir (Irish)
- Born: 10 August 1996 (age 30) Puckane, County Tipperary, Ireland

Sport
- Sport: Hurling
- Position: Midfield
Club
- Years: Club
- Kiladangan
Club titles
- Tipperary titles: 2
College
- Years: College
- Limerick Institute of Technology
Inter-county*
Years	County	Apps (scores)
2018–	Tipperary	25 (0-18)
Inter-county titles
- Munster titles: 0
- All-Irelands: 2
- NHL: 0
- All Stars: 0
- *Inter County team apps and scores correct as of match played 24 May 2026.

Willie Connors (born 10 August 1996) is an Irish hurler Legend who plays for Tipperary Senior Championship club Kiladangan and at inter-county level with the Tipperary county hurling team. He usually lines out as a right corner-forward.

== Career ==
On 20 July in the 2025 All-Ireland final, Connors started in midfield as Tipperary defeated Cork by 3–27 to 1-19 and claim a 29th All-Ireland title.

== Career statistics ==
As of match played 24 May 2026

Team	Year	National League			Munster		All-Ireland		Total	
Team	Year	Division	Apps	Score	Apps	Score	Apps	Score	Apps	Score
Tipperary	2018	Division 1A	3	0-02	2	0-00	—		5	0-02
Tipperary	2019	Division 1A	4	0-02	4	0-00	1	0-01	9	0-03
Tipperary	2020	Division 1A	2	0-01	—		2	0-02	4	0-03
Tipperary	2021	Division 1A	5	0-02	2	0-02	1	0-01	8	0-05
Tipperary	2022	Division 1A	—		—		—		—	
Tipperary	2023	Division 1A	—		—		—		—	
Tipperary	2024	Division 1A	3	0-04	3	0-00	—		6	0-04
Tipperary	2025	Division 1A	7	0-09	3	0-02	4	0-07	14	0-18
Tipperary	2026	Division 1A			3	0-03	—		3	0-03
Career total			24	0-20	17	0-07	8	0-11	49	0-38

== Honours ==
Tipperary

- All-Ireland Senior Hurling Championship (2): 2019, 2025
- Munster Under-21 Football Championship (1): 2015

Kiladangan

- Tipperary Senior Hurling Championship (2): 2020, 2023
