= Paul Flynn (Tipperary hurler) =

Irish hurler

Sport
- Sport: Hurling
- Position: Corner forward
Club
- Years: Club
- Kildangan
Club titles
- Tipperary titles: 1
Inter-county
| Years | County | Apps (scores) |
| 2017–present | Tipperary | 0 (0-00) |
Inter-county titles
- Munster titles: 0
- All-Irelands: 0
- NHL: 0
- All Stars: 0

Paul Flynn is an Irish sportsperson. He plays hurling with his local club Kildangan and has been a member of the Tipperary senior inter-county hurling team since 2017. He is also the brother of fellow Tipperary hurler Alan Flynn.

== Career ==
On 5 March 2017, Flynn made his senior Tipperary debut against Clare in the 2017 National Hurling League when he came on as a second-half substitute, replacing Aidan McCormack after 56 minutes. He went on to score two points from play in a 0–21 to 0–28 win.

== Honours ==
Kildangan

- Tipperary Senior Hurling Championship (1): 2020
