= 2020 Tipperary Senior Hurling Championship =

Annual hurling competition season

- Dates: 25 July 2020 – 20 September 2020
- Teams: 16
- Sponsor: FBD Insurance
- Champions: Kiladangan (1st title); Paul Flynn (captain); Brian Lawlor (manager)
- Runners-up: Loughmore–Castleiney; Joseph Hennessy (captain); Frankie McGrath (manager)
- Relegated: Burgess

Tournament statistics
- Matches played: 34
- Goals scored: 87 (2.56 per match)
- Points scored: 1213 (35.68 per match)
- Top scorer(s): John McGrath (1-64)

The 2020 Tipperary Senior Hurling Championship was the 129th staging of the Tipperary Senior Hurling Championship since its establishment by the Tipperary County Board in 1887. The draw for the group stage placings took place on 27 January 2020. The championship was scheduled to begin in April 2020, however, it was postponed indefinitely due to the impact of the COVID-19 pandemic on Gaelic games. The championship eventually began on 25 July and ended on 20 September 2020.

Borris–Ileigh were the defending champions, however, they were beaten by Drom & Inch in a penalty shoot-out at the quarter-final stage. Burgess were relegated after a 1–17 to 0–16 defeat by Éire Óg Annacarty in a playoff.

On 20 September 2020, Kiladangan won the championship after a 1–28 to 3-20 extra-time defeat of Loughmore–Castleiney in the final at Semple Stadium. This was their first ever championship title.

Loughmore–Castleiney's John McGrath was the championship's top scorer with 1-64.

== Team changes ==
The following teams have changed division since the 2019 Tipperary Senior Hurling Championship.

=== To Championship ===
Promoted from 2019 Tipperary Senior Roinn II (Séamus Ó Riain Cup)

- J.K. Bracken's - (Séamus Ó Riain Cup Champions)

=== From Championship ===
Relegated to 2020 Tipperary Senior Roinn II (Séamus Ó Riain Cup)

- Portroe

== Group stage ==
The championship format essentially remained the same with 16 teams being divided into four groups of four teams, however, on 25 June 2020 the management committee of the Tipperary County Board announced the removal of the preliminary quarter-finals and the abolition of a place for a divisional champion in the knock-out stage.

Advance to quarter-finals Advance to relegation semi-final

=== Table ===
Team	Matches				Score			Pts
Team	Pld	W	D	L	For	Against	Diff	Pts
Kiladangan	3	2	1	0	7-54	3-46	20	5
Drom & Inch	3	2	0	1	4-52	7-46	-3	4
J.K. Bracken's	3	0	2	1	5-46	3-56	-4	2
Roscrea	3	0	1	2	2-50	5-54	-13	1

=== Results ===
25 July 2020 Round 1	Drom & Inch	2-18 - 2-16	Roscrea	Páirc Shíleáin
	S Callanan 1-10; D Butler 1-2; D Collins 0-2; J Ryan 0-2; P Campion 0-1; J Maher 0-1	Report	L Cashin 0-10; C Booth 1-1; E Fitzpatrick 1-0; C Sheedy 0-2; D Tynan 0-1; S Fletcher 0-1; D O'Connor 0-1

25 July 2020 Round 1	Kiladangan	1-20 - 3-14	J. K. Bracken's	Semple Stadium
	B McLoughney 0-6; A Flynn 0-4; D O'Meara 1-0; W Connors 0-2; B Seymour 0-2; T Gallagher 0-2; S Hayes 0-1; P Flynn 0-1; J Gallagher 0-1; D Sweeney 0-1		L Fairbrother 1-9; A Ormond 1-2; J Moloney 1-0; S Scully 0-2; S Doyle 0-1

9 August 2020 Round 2	Roscrea	0-14 - 2-19	Kiladangan	MacDonagh Park
	L Cashin 0-7; A Tynan 0-3; G Loughnane 0-1; D Tynan 0-1; E Fitzpatrick 0-1		B McLoughney 1-4; W Connors 0-4; B Seymour 0-4; D O'Meara 1-0; P Flynn 0-2; S Hayes 0-2; T Gallagher 0-1; J Gallagher 0-1; D McGrath 0-1

9 August 2020 Round 2	J.K. Bracken's	1-15 - 2-16	Drom & Inch	Semple Stadium
	L Fairbrother 1-9; A Ormonde 0-3; S Doyle 0-2; C Cadell 0-1		S Callanan 0-6; D Collins 1-1; D Butler 1-1; M Connors 0-3; R Long 0-2; J Campion 0-2

15 August 2020 Round 3	J.K. Bracken's	1-17 - 0-20	Roscrea	MacDonagh Park
	L Fairbrother (0-10, 9F, 1 65); A Ormond (1-3); S Doyle (0-3); L Egan (0-1)	Report	L Cashin (0-9, 5f, 1 65); J Fitzpatrick (0-2f); C Sheedy (0-2); D O’Connor (0-2); E Fitzpatrick (0-1); K McMahon (0-1); A Tynan (0-1); A Booth (0-1)

15 August 2020 Round 3	Drom & Inch	0-18 - 4-15	Kiladangan	Semple Stadium
	S Callanan (0-11, 10f); D Collins (0-4); F Purcell (0-1); L Campion (0-1); T Nolan (0-1)	Report	P Flynn (2-2); W Connors (0-6, 5f); B Seymour (1-2); D O’Meara (1-2); B McLoughney (0-1); S Hayes (0-1); A Loughnane (0-1)

=== Group 2 ===
==== Table ====
Advance to quarter-finals Advance to relegation semi-final

Team	Matches				Score			Pts
Team	Pld	W	D	L	For	Against	Diff	Pts
Clonoulty–Rossmore	3	2	1	0	5-57	2-52	14	5
Nenagh Éire Óg	3	2	0	1	4-55	2-47	14	4
Holycross–Ballycahill	3	1	1	1	1-54	4-54	-9	3
Éire Óg Annacarty	3	0	0	3	2-48	4-61	-19	0

==== Results ====
26 July 2020 Round 1	Éire Óg Annacarty	0-16 - 2-18	Clonoulty–Rossmore	Semple Stadium
	A Griffin 0-9; D Crosse 0-3; D O'Dwyer 0-1; T Fox 0-1; L Óg O'Brien 0-1; R O'Brien 0-1		C Bourke 1-8; F O'Keeffe 1-1; D Quirke 0-3; M Ryan 0-2; J Hammersley 0-1; J O'Keeffe 0-1; R Heffernan 0-1; S Quinn 0-1

26 July 2020 Round 1	Nenagh Éire Óg	1-19 - 0-11	Holycross–Ballycahill	Semple Stadium
	J Morris 0-9; M Heffernan 1-3; J Mackey 0-2; P Morris 0-2; T Heffernan 0-2; P Murphy 0-1		D Woods 0-6; J Woods 0-2; B O'Mara 0-1; J Skehan 0-1

9 August 2020 Round 2	Holycross–Ballycahill	0-23 - 1-18	Éire Óg Annacarty	Clonoulty Sportsfield
	D Woods 0-7; C Barrett 0-6; L O'Mara 0-3; A Stakelum 0-2; S Flanagan 0-1; M Doyle 0-1; B O'Meara 0-1; C Ryan 0-1; R Nally 0-1		S Ryan 0-8; D O'Dwyer 1-1; T Fox 0-2; D Crosse 0-2; A Griffin 0-1; R O'Brien 0-1; P O'Dwyer 0-1; K Fox 0-1; D Mooney 0-1

9 August 2020 Round 2	Clonoulty–Rossmore	1-22 - 1-16	Nenagh Éire Óg	Semple Stadium
	T Hammersley 0-14; C Hammersley 1-0; C Bourke 0-3; D Quirke 0-2; R Heffernan 0-1; M Ryan 0-1; J Hammersley 0-1		J Morris 1-9; M Heffernan 0-4; C Hennessy 0-2; C Ryan 0-1

15 August 2020 Round 3	Holycross–Ballycahill	1-20 - 2-17	Clonoulty–Rossmore	Boherlahen Sportsfield
	D Woods 0-10; A Stakelum 1-4; C Barrett 0-4; J Woods 0-1; L O'Meara 0-1		D Quirke 0-6; T Hammersley 0-4; T Butler 1-0; S Quinn 1-0; M Ryan 0-3; C Hammersley 0-1; E Heffernan 0-1; C Bourke 0-1

15 August 2020 Round 3	Éire Óg Annacarty	1-14 - 2-20	Nenagh Éire Óg	The Ragg
	S Ryan 0-6; D Mooney 1-1; P Devlin 0-1; B Fox 0-1; C O'Brien 0-1; E Bradshaw 0-1; P O'Dwyer 0-1; T Fox 0-1; A Griffin 0-1		J Morris 1-11; M Heffernan 0-4; A Carey 1-0; Heffernan 0-2; J Mackey 0-1; D Quinn 0-1; C Hennessy 0-1

=== Group 3 ===
==== Table ====
Advance to quarter-finals Advance to relegation semi-final

Team	Matches				Score			Pts
Team	Pld	W	D	L	For	Against	Diff	Pts
Thurles Sarsfields	3	3	0	0	4-72	1-57	24	6
Loughmore–Castleiney	3	2	0	1	3-61	4-57	1	4
Kilruane MacDonagh's	3	1	0	2	6-46	5-52	-3	2
Moycarkey–Borris	3	0	0	3	2-55	5-68	-22	0

==== Results ====
25 July 2020 Round 1	Thurles Sarsfields	1-19 - 1-13	Kilruane MacDonagh's	St. Michael's Park
	A McCormack 0-5; D Maher 1-0; R Maher 0-2; B McCarthy 0-2; E Purcell 0-2; P Bourke 0-2; C Lanigan 0-2; L Corbett 0-1; M Gleeson 0-1; P Maher 0-1; J Maher 0-1	Report	C Darcy 0-8; K O'Kelly 1-0; D Peters 0-1; C Morgan 0-1; R McLoughney 0-1; S Hennessy 0-1; N O'Meara 0-1

25 July 2020 Round 1	Moycarkey–Borris	0-17 - 1-22	Loughmore–Castleiney	Semple Stadium
	K Morris 0-11; J Morrissey 0-2; K Cummins 0-1; R Ryan 0-1; P Molloy 0-1; N Heffernan 0-1		J McGrath 0-10; J Nyland 1-1; C McGrath 0-4; N McGrath 0-2; C Connolly 0-2; E Connolly 0-1; L Treacy 0-1; T McGrath 0-1

7 August 2020 Round 2	Loughmore–Castleiney	0-25 - 2-28	Thurles Sarsfields	Semple Stadium
	J McGrath 0-14; E Sweeney 0-2; A McGrath 0-2; N McGrath 0-2; C Connolly 0-2; Conor McGrath 0-1; Ciaran McGrath 0-1; J Meagher 0-1		P Bourke 2-3; A McCormack 0-8; C Lanigan 0-6; R Maher 0-3; B McCarthy 0-2; D Maher 0-2; E Purcell 0-2; P Maher 0-1; J Maher 0-1

8 August 2020 Round 2	Kilruane MacDonagh's	3-21 - 2-19	Moycarkey–Borris	Páirc Shíleáin
	C Darcy 0-12; J Cahill 1-3; K O'Kelly 1-1; N O'Meara 0-3; K Cahill 0-2		K Morris 0-8; J Morrissey 0-4; JJ Darmody 1-0; R Shelly 1-0; K Shelly 0-2; M Hackett 0-2; J Bergin 0-2; K Cummins 0-1

16 August 2020 Round 3	Moycarkey–Borris	0-19 - 1-25	Thurles Sarsfields	St. Michael's Park
	K Shelly (0-5f); J Morrissey (0-4, 2f); M Hackett (0-3); JJ Dermody (0-1); K Cummins (0-1); T Hayes (0-1); J Bergin (0-1); P Molloy (0-1); J Fallon (0-1)	Report	A McCormack (0-12, 5f); S Cahill (0-4); T Doyle (1-0); J Maher (0-3); P Bourke (0-3); R Maher (0-2); D Maher (0-1)

16 August 2020 Round 3	Kilruane MacDonagh's	2-12 - 2-14	Loughmore–Castleiney	Semple Stadium
	C Darcy 1-3 (3f); W Cleary 1-0; P Williams 0-3 (3f); N O’Meara 0-3; J Cahill 0-2; S Hennessy 0-1	Report	J McGrath 0-9 (7f); E Sweeney 2-3; Conor McGrath0-1; N McGrath 0-1

=== Group 4 ===
==== Table ====
Advance to quarter-finals Advance to relegation semi-final

Team	Matches				Score			Pts
Team	Pld	W	D	L	For	Against	Diff	Pts
Borris–Ileigh	3	2	1	0	4-64	4-42	22	5
Toomevara	3	1	2	0	5-60	4-53	10	4
Upperchurch–Drombane	3	1	1	1	5-48	2-59	-2	3
Burgess	3	0	0	3	2-45	6-63	-30	0

==== Results ====
26 July 2020 Round 1	Burgess	0-16 - 0-21	Upperchurch–Drombane	Dolla Sportsfield
	S Murray 0-7; S Kirwan 0-3; T O'Halloran 0-2; T Dunne 0-1; J Mulqueen 0-1; R Tucker 0-1; B O'Flaherty 0-1		P Greene 0-7; G Ryan 0-5; N Grant 0-3; M Lee 0-3; J Butler 0-1; P Shanahan 0-1; P Ryan 0-1

26 July 2020 Round 1	Toomevara	1-18 - 0-21	Borris–Ileigh	Páirc Shíleáin
	J McLoughney 0-6; M McCarthy 1-2; K McCarthy 0-5; J Delaney 0-1; K Ryan 0-1; W Coffey 0-1; C O'Meara 0-1; D Young 0-1	Report	B Maher 0-6; J Kelly 0-5; Kevin Maher 0-4; Kieran Maher 0-2; D McCormack 0-1; J Devaney 0-1; C Kenny 0-1; T Ryan 0-1

8 August 2020 Round 2	Borris–Ileigh	3-23 - 1-14	Burgess	MacDonagh Park
	J Devaney 2-1; C Kenny 0-6; B Maher 1-2; K Maher 0-5; J Kelly 0-4; S Kenny 0-3; N Kenny 0-1; M Stapleton 0-1	Report	S Murray 0-10; B O'Flaherty 1-0; S Kirwan 0-2; J Mulqueen 0-1; K Nealon 0-1

8 August 2020 Round 2	Upperchurch–Drombane	3-17 - 1-23	Toomevara	Semple Stadium
	P Greene 1-11; J Butler 2-0; G Ryan 0-3; K Ryan 0-1; M Lee 0-1; D Grant 0-1	Report	J McLoughney 0-7; J Delaney 0-6; M McCarthy 0-4; R Quirke 1-0; C O'Meara 0-3; R Quirke 0-1; K McCarthy 0-1; W Coffey 0-1

16 August 2020 Round 3	Burgess	1-15 - 3-19	Toomevara	MacDonagh Park
	S Murray (1-5, 1-0 p, 0-5f); D Ryan (0-3); D Maher (0-3); T Dune (0-3); K Nealon (0-1); C Gill (0-1)	Report	J McLoughney (1-4f); P Ryan (1-2); A Ryan (1-1); D Young (0-2); K McCarthy (0-2); M McCarthy (0-2); K Ryan (0-2); J Delaney (0-1); R Quirke (0-1); R Quirke (0-1)

16 August 2020 Round 3	Borris–Ileigh	1-20 - 2-10	Upperchurch–Drombane	Semple Stadium
	K Maher (0-9, 8f); N Kenny (1-1); B Maher (0-4f); J Kelly (0-2); C Cowan (0-1); S Kenny (0-1); J Devaney (0-1); J Harkin (0-1)	Report	P Greene (0-8, 6f); J Butler (1-0); P Shortt (1-0f); G Ryan (0-1f); D Grant (0-1)

== Relegation play-off ==
=== Semi-finals ===
29 August 2020 Semi-final	Moycarkey–Borris	1-24 - 1-22	Burgess	Fr. Kenyon Park
	Kieran Morris (0-11, 8f); Rhys Shelly (1-0p); Pat Molloy (0-3); John Kirwan (0-3); Jack Morrissey (0-2); Darren Flood (0-2); Kieran Cummins (0-1); John Bergin (0-1)	Report	Stephen Murray (1-13, 9f, 2 65); Donagh Maher (0-2); Stephen Kirwan (0-2); Keith Nealon (0-2); Tony Dunne (0-1); Bill O'Flaherty (0-1); Danny Ryan (0-1)

29 August 2020 Semi-final	Éire Óg Annacarty	1-14 - 2-19	Roscrea	Drombane Sportsfield
	Aidan Griffin (0-5, 4f); Darragh Mooney (1-0p); Donal O'Dwyer (0-3); Eoin Bradshaw (0-2); Mike O'Brien (0-1); Conor O'Brien (0-1); Paul Downey (0-1); Seanie Ryan (0-1)	Report	Luke Cashin (0-8, 4f); Alan Tynan (2-0); Evan Fitzpatrick (0-4); Jason Fitzpatrick (0-4); Darragh Tynan (0-1); Shane Fletcher (0-1); Conor Sheedy (0-1)

=== Final ===
12 September 2020 Final	Burgess	0-16 - 1-17	Éire Óg Annacarty	The Ragg
	S Murray 0-8 (6 frees); D Maher 0-4; J Mulqueen 0-3; S Kirwan 0-1.	Report	D O’Dwyer 0-5; S Ryan 0-3 frees; D Mooney 1-0 pen; P Downey, T Fox, D Crosse 0-2 each; R O’Brien, P O’Dwyer, A Griffen (free) 0-1 each.

== Finals ==
=== Bracket ===
Quarter-finals
29 August, Semple Stadium
Kiladangan	3-16
Toomevara	0-18
30 August, Semple Stadium
Borris–Ileigh	1-28 (2)
Drom & Inch (p)	4-19 (3)
30 August, Semple Stadium
Clonoulty–Rossmore	0-20
Loughmore–Castleiney	2-21
29 August, Semple Stadium
Thurles Sarsfields	0-08
Nenagh Éire Óg	3-12

Semi-finals
5 September, Semple Stadium
Kiladangan	1-21
Drom & Inch	0-09
5 September, Semple Stadium
Loughmore–Castleiney	1-22
Nenagh Éire Óg	1-12

Final
20 September, Semple Stadium
Kiladangan	1-28
Loughmore–Castleiney	3-20

=== Quarter-finals ===
29 August 2020 Quarter-final	Kiladangan	3-16 - 0-18	Toomevara	Semple Stadium
	B Seymour (0-7, 4f); P Flynn (0-4); J Gallagher (1-2); D O Meara (1-0); W Connors (1-0); B McLoughney(0-2); S Hayes (0-1)	Report	K McCarthy (0-7, 3f); J Delaney (0-5); Jason Ryan (0-2); K Ryan (0-1); P Ryan (0-1); D Young (0-1); K McCarthy (0-1, f)	Referee: K Jordan (Thurles Gaels)

29 August 2020 Quarter-final	Thurles Sarsfields	0-08 - 3-12	Nenagh Éire Óg	Semple Stadium
	A McCormack (0-5, 5f); D Maher (1-0); D Corbett (0-1); J Maher (0-1); S Cahill (0-1)	Report	J Morris (3-6, 1-3f); T Heffernan (0-4); K Gleeson (0-1); P Murphy (0-1)	Referee: M Kennedy (Newcastle)

30 August 2020 Quarter-final	Clonoulty–Rossmore	0-20 - 2-21	Loughmore–Castleiney	Semple Stadium
	T Hammersley (0-13, 12f); C Bourke (0-2); R Heffernan (0-1); J O’Keeffe (0-1); T Butler (0-1); E Heffernan (0-1); F O’Keeffe (0-1)	Report	J McGrath (0-9, 8f); Ciaran McGrath (2-1); B McGrath (0-2); E Sweeney (0-2); N McGrath (0-2); A McGrath (0-1); T McGrath (0-1); J Meagher (0-1); J Nyland (0-1); Conor McGrath (0-1)

30 August 2020 Quarter-final	Borris–Ileigh	1-28 - 4-19; Penalties: 2-3	Drom & Inch	Semple Stadium
	B Maher 0-12 (0-11f); C Kenny 0-5; JD Devaney 1-0; J Kelly 0-3 (0-3f); K Maher 0-2; T Ryan 0-2; D McCormack 0-2; R McCormack 0-1; S Kenny 0-1.	Report	S Callanan 1-9 (1-6f); D Butler 2-2; J Maher 1-0; M Connors 0-2; J Campion 0-2; L Campion 0-1; J Ryan 0-1; D Collins 0-1; S Hassett 0-1.

=== Semi-finals ===
5 September 2020 Semi-final	Loughmore-Castleiney	1-22 - 1-12	Nenagh Éire Óg	Semple Stadium
	John McGrath (0-12, 5f, 1 65); Tomas McGrath (1-2); Evan Sweeney (0-3); Ciaran Connolly (0-2); Joseph Nyland (0-1); Aidan McGrath (0-1); Noel McGrath (0-1)	Report	Michael Heffernan (0-5, 2f); Tommy Heffernan (1-1); Jake Morris (0-2); Paddy Murphy (0-2); James Mackey (0-1); Daire Quinn (0-1)	Referee: Fergal Horgan

5 September 2020 Semi-final	Drom & Inch	0-09 - 1-21	Kiladangan	Semple Stadium
	Seamus Callanan (0-7, 6f); Michael Connors (0-1); David Collins (0-1)	Report	Billy Seymour (0-10, 9f); Bryan McLoughney (1-1); Paul Flynn (0-3); Willie Connors (0-2); Alan Flynn (0-1); Joe Gallagher (0-1); Tadhg Gallagher (0-1); Ruairi Gleeson (0-1); Sean Hayes (0-1)	Referee: Michael Kennedy

=== Final ===
20 September 2020 Final (Live on TG4)	Kiladangan	1-28 - 3-20 (aet)	Loughmore–Castleiney	Semple Stadium
	B Seymour (0-8, 5 frees); P Flynn (0-7); B McLoughney (1-2); S Hayes (0-4); A Flynn (0-3); D O’Meara, W Connors (sideline), D McGrath, A Loughnane (0-1 each).	Report	J McGrath (1-10, 0-5 frees, 1 65); N McGrath (0-5); E Sweeney, T McGrath (1-0 each); J Nyland (0-2); B McGrath, L Treacy, T Maher (0-1 each).	Referee: M Kennedy

== Championship statistics ==
=== Top scorers ===
Overall

Rank	Player	Club	Tally	Total	Matches	Average
1	John McGrath	Loughmore–Castleiney	1-64	67	6	11.16
2	Jake Morris	Nenagh Éire Óg	5-37	52	5	10.40
3	Séamus Callanan	Drom & Inch	2-45	51	5	10.20
4	Stephen Murray	Burgess	2-43	49	5	9.80
5	Billy Seymour	Kiladangan	1-33	36	6	6.00
6	Lyndon Fairbrother	J.K. Bracken's	2-28	34	3	11.33
6	Luke Cashin	Roscrea	0-34	34	4	8.50
7	Timmy Hammersley	Clonoulty–Rossmore	0-31	31	4	7.75
8	Kieran Morris	Moycarkey–Borris	0-30	30	3	10.00
8	Aidan McCormack	Thurles Sarsfields	0-30	30	4	7.50

In a single game

Rank	Player	Club	Tally	Total	Opposition
1	Stephen Murray	Burgess	1-13	16	Moycarkey-Borris
2	Jake Morris	Nenagh Éire Óg	3-06	15	Thurles Sarsfields
3	Paudie Greene	Upperchurch–Drombane	1-11	14	Toomevara
3	Jake Morris	Nenagh Éire Óg	1-11	14	Éire Óg Annacarty
3	Timmy Hammersley	Clonoulty–Rossmore	0-14	14	Toomevara
3	John McGrath	Loughmore–Castleiney	0-14	14	Thurles Sarafields
4	Séamus Callanan	Drom & Inch	1-10	13	Roscrea
4	John McGrath	Loughmore–Castleiney	1-10	13	Kiladangan
4	Timmy Hammersley	Clonoulty–Rossmore	0-13	13	Loughmore–Castleimey
5	Lyndon Fairbrother	J.K. Bracken's	1-09	12	Kiladangan
5	Séamus Callanan	Drom & Inch	1-09	12	Borris–Ileigh
5	Lyndon Fairbrother	J.K. Bracken's	1-09	12	Drom & Inch
5	Jake Morris	Nenagh Éire Óg	1-09	12	Clonoulty–Rossmore
5	Brendan Maher	Borris–Ileigh	0-12	12	Drom & Inch
5	Cian Darcy	Kilruane MacDonagh's	0-12	12	Moycarkey–Borris
5	Aidan McCormack	Thurles Sarsfields	0-12	12	Moycarkey–Borris
5	John McGrath	Loughmore–Castleiney	0-12	12	Nenagh Éire Óg

=== Miscellaneous ===
- Kiladangan won their first title, having previously lost three finals.
