= Knigh =

Civil parish in County Tipperary, Ireland

Knigh (An Chnaoi in Irish) is a townland and civil parish in the historical Barony of Ormond Lower in County Tipperary, Ireland. It is located between Nenagh and Puckaun.

Knigh is in the Dáil constituency of Offaly which incorporates 24 electoral divisions that were previously in the Tipperary North Dáil constituency.
