= Éamonn Kelly =

Irish Gaelic footballer

Personal information
- Native name: Éamonn Ó Ceallaigh (Irish)
- Born: 1968 (age 57–58) Puckane, County Tipperary, Ireland
- Occupation: Agency Development Manager

Sport
- Sport: Hurling
Club
- Years: Club
- Kildangan
Club titles
	Football	Hurling
Tipperary titles	0	0

Éamonn Kelly (born 1968) is an Irish hurler who played as a full-forward for the Tipperary junior hurling team.

Born in Puckane, County Tipperary, Kelly first arrived on the inter-county scene at the age of seventeen when he first linked up with the Tipperary minor teams as a dual player, before later joining the under-21 hurling team. He joined the junior team for the 1987 championship. Kelly went on to play a key role for Tipperary over the next few years, and won one two All-Ireland medals in the junior grade.

At club level Kelly played both hurling and Gaelic football with Kildangan.

In retirement from playing, Kelly became involved in team management and coaching. He was an All-Ireland-winning manager with the Kildangan intermediate hurling team in 2005, as well as serving as a manager and as a selector with the Tipperary under-21 and intermediate hurling teams.

Kelly was appointed manager of the Kerry senior hurling team in January 2014. He led the county to a National Hurling League Div 2A title with a win over Carlow. His side then lost a controversial play-off to Offaly, missing out on a pace in Div 1B. His side regrouped to make it to the final of the Christy Ring Cup for the fourth time in five seasons. They faced Kildare but for the second year in a row lost out by a 2 points.

In July 2015, Kelly stepped down from the position as Kerry manager. In September 2015, Kelly was named as the new manager of the Offaly hurling team. In September 2016, Kelly stepped down as manager of the Offaly team, saying "Having reviewed the season just gone and considered the increasing personal and business demands on my time at present, I have informed Offaly County Board that I will not be in a position to continue as manager of the Senior Hurling team for 2017."

Later that year, Kelly was named as manager of neighbouring county Laois for the forthcoming season. Following two years at the helm of the O’Moore County and a relegation battle in Division 1B with Antrim, Kelly stepped down as Laois manager to return to club management henceforth after the county were knocked out of the Joe McDonagh Cup, saying: “I have enjoyed the last two years and made many friends. I am disappointed not to have built on the progress we made last year and I wish Laois every success going forward.”

== Career statistics ==
=== Manager ===
As of match played 2 July 2016.

Team	From	To	Pre-season				League				Ring Cup				Provincial				All-Ireland				Total				
Team	From	To	G	W	D	L	G	W	D	L	G	W	D	L	G	W	D	L	G	W	D	L	G	W	D	L	Win %
Kerry	27 January 2014	21 July 2015	2	0	0	2	14	11	1	2	8	7	0	1	0	0	0	0	0	0	0	0	24	18	1	5	75
Offaly	8 September 2015	14 August 2016	2	1	0	1	6	3	0	3	0	0	0	0	5	3	0	2	1	0	0	1	14	7	0	7	50

== Honours ==
=== Team ===
Tipperary

- All-Ireland Junior Hurling Championship (2): 1989, 1991
- Munster Junior Hurling Championship (3): 1988, 1989, 1991

=== Manager ===
Kildangan

- All-Ireland Intermediate Club Hurling Championship (1): 2005
- Munster Intermediate Club Hurling Championship (1): 2004
- Tipperary Intermediate Hurling Championship (1): 2004

Kerry

- National League (Division 2A) (2): 2014, 2015
- Christy Ring Cup (1): 2015

Sporting positions
Preceded by Liam Sheedy	Tipperary Intermediate Hurling Manager; 2003-2004	Succeeded by Len Gaynor
Preceded by Tom Howard	Kerry Senior Hurling Manager; 2014-2015	Succeeded by Ciarán Carey
Preceded by Brian Whelahan	Offaly Senior Hurling Manager; 2015-2016	Succeeded by TBA
Preceded by Séamus Plunkett	Laois Senior Hurling Manager; 2016-2018	Succeeded by Eddie Brennan
