= Jake Morris (hurler) =

Irish hurler (born 1999)

Personal information
- Native name: Seán Ó Muiris (Irish)
- Born: 13 May 1999 (age 27) Nenagh, County Tipperary, Ireland

Sport
- Sport: Hurling
- Position: Right wing-forward
Club*
Years	Club	Apps (scores)
2017–	Nenagh Éire Óg	29 (21-133)
Club titles
- Tipperary titles: 0
College
- Years: College
- 2018–2021: University of Limerick
Inter-county**
Years	County	Apps (scores)
2018–	Tipperary	40 (6-91)
Inter-county titles
- Munster titles: 0
- All-Irelands: 2
- NHL: 0
- All Stars: 1
- * club appearances and scores correct as of 13:15, 3 October 2020. **Inter County team apps and scores correct as of match played 24 May 2026.

Jake Morris (born 13 May 1999) is an Irish hurler who plays for Tipperary Senior Championship club Nenagh Éire Óg and at inter-county level with the Tipperary senior hurling team. He usually lines out as a right wing-forward.

== Playing career ==
=== Nenagh CBS ===
Morris first came to prominence as a hurler with Nenagh CBS. He played in all grades before joining the school's senior team and made several appearances in the Dr. Harty Cup.

=== University of Limerick ===
After lining out for the University of Limerick freshers' team in his first year, Morris made his first appearance in the Fitzgibbon Cup on 20 January 2019. He scored three points in a 0–26 to 0–20 defeat by University College Cork.

=== Nenagh Éire Óg ===
Morris joined the Nenagh Éire Óg club at a young age and played in all grades at juvenile and underage levels, enjoying divisional success in some competitions.

On 21 October 2018, he lined out at centre-forward when Nenagh Éire Óg faced Clonoulty-Rossmore in the final of the Tipperary Senior Championship. He top scored for the club with six points, including five frees, in the 2–13 to 0–23 defeat.

=== Tipperary ===
==== Minor, under-21 and under-20 ====
Morris was just 16-years-old when he made his first appearance for the Tipperary minor team on 23 April 2016. He scored a point from midfield in the 1–20 to 1–17 defeat by Waterford in the Munster Championship. On 10 July, he top scored with 1-04 when Tipperary defeated Limerick by 1–24 to 0–10 to win the Munster Championship final. On 4 September, Morris was at centre-forward when Tipperary faced Limerick in the All-Ireland final. He was Tipperary's top scorer once again in the 1–21 to 0–17 victory.

Morris was eligible for the minor grade again the following year, however, his tenure in the grade ended on 3 July 2017 following a 2–22 to 2–19 defeat by Cork.

Morris made his first appearance for the Tipperary under-21 team on 21 June 2018. He was named at full-forward but played much of the game in the half-forward line in a 1–22 to 1–13 defeat of Limerick in the Munster Championship. On 4 July he scored a point from left wing-forward in Tipperary's 2–23 to 1–13 defeat by Cork in the Munster Championship final. On 26 August, both Tipperary and Cork faced each other again in the All-Ireland final. Morris ended the game as top scorer with 1–04 in a 3–13 to 1–16 victory for Tipperary. He ended the year by being named in the right corner-forward position on the Team of the Year.

On 9 July 2019, Morris made his first appearance for Tipperary's inaugural under-20 team. He top scored with 0-13 from right corner-forward in the 3–23 to 0–10 defeat of Waterford. On 23 July 2019, Morris scored 1-03, including the winning goal, when Tipperary defeated Cork by 3–15 to 2–17 to win the Munster Championship.

==== Senior ====
Morris made his first appearance for the Tipperary senior team on 27 May 2018. He was introduced as a 70th-minute substitute and scored a point to secure a 2–20 to 1–23 draw with Cork in the Munster Championship.

On 30 June 2019, Morris was selected at left corner-forward when Tipperary faced Limerick in the Munster final. He scored a point from play but ended on the losing side following the 2–26 to 2–14 defeat.

On 20 July in the 2025 All-Ireland final, Morris started in the half-forward line as Tipperary defeated Cork by 3–27 to 1-19 and claim a 29th All-Ireland title.

== Career statistics ==
=== Club ===
As of 26 October 2025

Team	Year	Tipperary SHC	
Team	Year	Apps	Score
Nenagh Éire Óg	2017	2	3-04
Nenagh Éire Óg	2018	6	0-30
Nenagh Éire Óg	2019	4	4-16
Nenagh Éire Óg	2020	5	5-37
Nenagh Éire Óg	2021	3	0-13
Nenagh Éire Óg	2022	4	4-10
Nenagh Éire Óg	2023	1	0-06
Nenagh Éire Óg	2024	4	5-17
Nenagh Éire Óg	2025	6	2-19
Career total		35	23-154

=== Inter-county ===
==== Minor ====
Team	Year	Munster		All-Ireland		Total	
Team	Year	Apps	Score	Apps	Score	Apps	Score
Tipperary	2016	4	1-05	2	1-03	6	2-08
Tipperary	2017	3	0-09	—		3	0-09
Career total		7	1-14	2	1-03	9	2-17

==== Under-21/under-20 ====
As of match played 24 August 2019.

Team	Year	Munster		All-Ireland		Total	
Team	Year	Apps	Score	Apps	Score	Apps	Score
Tipperary	2018	2	0-04	2	2-13	4	2-17
Tipperary	2019	2	1-16	2	1-13	4	2-29
Career total		4	1-20	4	3-26	8	4-46

==== Senior ====
As of match played 24 May 2026

Team	Year	National League			Munster		All-Ireland		Total	
Team	Year	Division	Apps	Score	Apps	Score	Apps	Score	Apps	Score
Tipperary	2018	Division 1A	0	0-00	3	0-01	—		3	0-01
Tipperary	2019	Division 1A	5	0-05	5	0-03	3	0-02	13	0-10
Tipperary	2020	Division 1A	4	1-08	1	1-01	2	1-01	7	3-10
Tipperary	2021	Division 1A	4	0-07	2	1-05	—		6	1-12
Tipperary	2022	Division 1B	4	1-09	4	1-07	—		8	2-16
Tipperary	2023	Division 1B	5	5-06	3	2-11	2	0-07	10	7-24
Tipperary	2024	Division 1B	5	5-12	4	0-17	—		9	5-29
Tipperary	2025	Division 1A	7	1-15	4	0-13	3	0-11	14	1-39
Tipperary	2026	Division 1A			4	0-12			4	0-12
Career total			34	13-62	30	5-70	10	1-21	74	19-153

== Honours ==
Tipperary

- All-Ireland Senior Hurling Championship (2): 2019, 2025
- All-Ireland Under-21 Hurling Championship (2): 2018, 2019
- Munster Under-20 Hurling Championship (1): 2019
- All-Ireland Minor Hurling Championship (1): 2016
- Munster Minor Hurling Championship (1):2016

Individual

- The Sunday Game Team of the Year: 2025
- The Sunday Game Hurler of the Year: 2025
- All Star Award (1): 2025
