= Billy Seymour =

Irish hurler

Personal information
- Native name: Liam Saomar (Irish)
- Born: 1999 (age 26–27) Puckane, County Tipperary, Ireland
- Occupation: Student

Sport
- Sport: Hurling
- Position: Full-forward
Club
- Years: Club
- Kiladangan
Club titles
- Tipperary titles: 1
College
- Years: College
- Limerick Institute of Technology
College titles
- Fitzgibbon titles: 0
Inter-county
- Years: County
- 2024-: Tipperary
Inter-county titles
- Munster titles: 0
- All-Irelands: 0
- NHL: 0
- All Stars: 0

Billy Seymour (born 1999) is an Irish hurler who plays for Tipperary Senior Championship club Kiladangan and at inter-county level with the Tipperary senior hurling team. He usually lines out as a full-forward.

== Career ==
On 11 February 2024, he made his league debut for Tipperary in the second round of the 2024 National Hurling League against Galway when he came on as a second-half substitute in 1–26 to 0–24 win.

== Honours ==
Kiladangan

- Tipperary Senior Hurling Championship (1): 2020

Tipperary

- All-Ireland Under-21 Hurling Championship (1): 2019
- Munster Under-20 Hurling Championship (1): 2019
