= Jerome Cahill =

Irish hurler

Personal information
- Native name: Diarmuid Ó Cathail (Irish)
- Born: 1999 (age 26–27) Ardcroney, County Tipperary, Ireland
- Occupation: Student Accountant

Sport
- Sport: Hurling
- Position: Midfield
Club
- Years: Club
- Kilruane MacDonagh's
Club titles
- Tipperary titles: 1
Inter-county*
| Years | County | Apps (scores) |
| 2019- | Tipperary | 2 (0-01) |
Inter-county titles
- Munster titles: 0
- All-Irelands: 1
- NHL: 0
- All Stars: 0
- *Inter County team apps and scores correct as of 11:58, 27 July 2019.

Jerome Cahill (born 1999) is an Irish hurler who plays for Tipperary Senior Championship club Kilruane MacDonagh's and at inter-county level with the Tipperary senior hurling team. He usually lines out as a midfielder.

== Playing career ==
=== Nenagh CBS ===
Cahill first came to prominence as a hurler with Nenagh CBS. He played in every grade of hurling before eventually joining the school's senior hurling team and lined out in several Harty Cup campaigns.

=== Kilruane MacDonagh's ===
Cahill joined the Kilruane MacDonagh's club at a young age and played in all grades at juvenile and underage levels before eventually joining the club's top adult team in the Tipperary Senior Championship.

On 16 September 2018, Cahill was included on the Kilruane MacDonagh's that faced Kiladangan in the North Tipperary Championship final. He ended the game with a winners' medal following the 0–19 to 0–12 victory.

=== Tipperary ===
==== Minor, under-21 and under-20 ====
Cahill made his first appearance for the Tipperary minor team on 23 April 2016 when he lined out at left corner-back in a 1–20 to 1–17 defeat by Waterford in the Munster Championship. On 10 July 2016, he was switched to right corner-back but played some of the game as a sweeper when Tipperary defeated Limerick by 1–24 to 0–10 to win the Munster final. On 4 September 2016, Cahill was at left wing-back when Tipperary renewed their rivalry with Limerick in the All-Ireland final. He ended the game with a winners' medal following the 1–21 to 0–17 victory.

Cahill was eligible for the minor grade again the following year, however, his tenure in the grade ended on 3 July 2017 following a 2–22 to 2–19 defeat by Cork in the Munster Championship.

Cahill made his first appearance for the Tipperary under-21 team on 21 June 2018. He was named at right wing-forward but played much of the game at left wing-forward line in the 1–22 to 1–13 defeat of Limerick in the Munster Championship. On 4 July 2018, he scored 1-01 from play in Tipperary's 2–23 to 1–13 defeat by Cork in the Munster final. On 26 August 2018, both Tipperary and Cork faced each other again in the All-Ireland final. Cahill ended the game with a winners' medal after scoring three points in the 3–13 to 1–16 victory.

On 9 July 2019, Cahill made his first appearance for Tipperary's inaugural under-20 team when he lined out at midfield in the 3–23 to 0–10 defeat of Waterford. On 23 July 2019, he scored a point when Tipperary defeated Cork by 3–15 to 2–17 to win the Munster Championship.

==== Senior ====
Cahill was drafted onto the Tipperary senior team in advance of the 2019 National League, however, he made no appearances during the campaign. On 30 June 2019, he made his first appearance for the Tipperary senior team when he came on as a 61st-minute substitute for John O'Dwyer at centre-forward in a 2–26 to 2–14 defeat by Limerick in the Munster final. On 18 August 2019, Cahill won an All-Ireland medal as a non-playing substitute following Tipperary's 3–25 to 0–20 defeat of Kilkenny in the All-Ireland final.

== Career statistics ==
As of match played 18 August 2019.

| Team | Year | National League | | | Munster | | All-Ireland | | Total | |
| Team | Year | Division | Apps | Score | Apps | Score | Apps | Score | Apps | Score |
|---|---|---|---|---|---|---|---|---|---|---|
| Tipperary | 2019 | Division 1A | 0 | 0-00 | 1 | 0-01 | 1 | 0-00 | 2 | 0-01 |
| Total | | | 0 | 0-00 | 1 | 0-01 | 1 | 0-00 | 2 | 0-01 |

== Honours ==
Kilruane MacDonagh's

- North Tipperary Senior Hurling Championship (1): 2018
- Tipperary Senior Hurling Championship (1): 2022 (c)

Tipperary

- All-Ireland Senior Hurling Championship (1): 2019
- All-Ireland Under-21 Hurling Championship (2): 2018, 2019
- Munster Under-20 Hurling Championship (1): 2019
- All-Ireland Minor Hurling Championship (1): 2016
- Munster Minor Hurling Championship (1): 2016
