= Conor Kenny (hurler) =

Irish hurler

Personal information
- Native name: Conchúir Ó Cionnaith (Irish)
- Born: 12 October 1992 (age 34) Newbridge, Ireland
- Occupation: Student
- Height: 1.85 m (6 ft 1 in)

Sport
- Sport: Hurling
- Position: Full Forward
Clubs
- Years: Club
- 2009-2012 2013-: Celbridge; Borris–Ileigh
Club titles
- Kildare titles: 3
Inter-county
- Years: County
- 2011-2012 2014-: Kildare; Tipperary

Conor Kenny (born 12 October 1992) is an Irish sportsperson. He plays hurling with his local club Borris–Ileigh and with the Tipperary senior inter-county team since 2014. Kenny is originally from Celbridge in Kildare and previously played for the Kildare hurling team.

== Career ==
He started his intercounty career with Kildare playing in the Christy Ring Cup and the All-Ireland Under-21 B Hurling Championship.

He played in the All-Ireland Intermediate Hurling Championship winning team for Tipperary in 2013. Kenny made his debut in January 2014 for Tipperary and in February 2014, he scored a goal against Clare in the 2014 Waterford Crystal Cup final as Tipperary won by 14 points.

== Honours ==
Borris–Ileigh

- Munster Senior Club Hurling Championship (1): 2019 (jc)
- Tipperary Senior Hurling Championship (1): 2019 (jc)

Tipperary

- Munster Intermediate Hurling Championship (1): 2013
- All-Ireland Intermediate Hurling Championship (1): 2013
- Waterford Crystal Cup (1): 2014
- Munster Senior Hurling Championship (1): 2015
