= Rhys Shelly =

Irish hurler

Personal information
- Nickname: Shelly
- Born: 28 December 2000 (age 25) Littleton, Thurles
- Height: 6 ft 2 in (188 cm)

Sport
- Sport: Hurling
- Position: Goalkeeper
Club
- Years: Club
- 2018–2023: Moycarkey–Borris
College
- Years: College
- 2021–2023: University of Limerick
College titles
- Fitzgibbon titles: 2
Inter-county*
| Years | County | Apps (scores) |
| 2023- | Tipperary | 14 (0-02) |
Inter-county titles
- All-Irelands: 1
- All Stars: 1
- *Inter County team apps and scores correct as of match played 24 May 2026.

Rhys Shelly is an Irish hurler who plays club hurling for Moycarkey–Borris and at inter-county level with the Tipperary senior hurling team.

== Career ==
On 11 March 2023, Shelly made his league debut for Tipperary in 4th round of the 2023 National Hurling League against Waterford as Tipperary won by 2–32 to 0–18.

On 21 May 2023, he made his Championship debut in the third round of the 2023 Munster Senior Hurling Championship against Limerick in Semple Stadium. He scored a point in the first half of that game from a long-range free in a match that finished level.

On 20 July in the 2025 All-Ireland final, Shelly started in goals as Tipperary defeated Cork by 3–27 to 1-18 and claim a 29th All-Ireland title. In the second half of the match, Shelly scored a point from play and also saved a penalty from Conor Lehane. His point was the first ever point scored by a goalkeeper from open play in an All-Ireland final.

== Career statistics ==
(Championship only) As of match played 24 May 2026

| Team | Year | National League | | | Munster | | All-Ireland | | Total | |
| Team | Year | Division | Apps | Score | Apps | Score | Apps | Score | Apps | Score |
|---|---|---|---|---|---|---|---|---|---|---|
| Tipperary | 2023 | Division 1 | | | 2 | 0-01 | 2 | 0-00 | 4 | 0-01 |
| Tipperary | 2024 | Division 1 | | | - | | - | | | |
| Tipperary | 2025 | Division 1 | | | 2 | 0-00 | 4 | 0-01 | 6 | 0-01 |
| Tipperary | 2026 | Division 1 | | | 4 | 0-00 | | | 4 | 0-00 |
| Career total | | | | | 8 | 0-01 | 6 | 0-01 | 14 | 0-02 |

== Honours ==
University of Limerick

- Fitzgibbon Cup (1): 2023

Tipperary

- All-Ireland Senior Hurling Championship (1): 2025

Individual

- The Sunday Game Team of the Year (1): 2025
- All Star Award (1): 2025
