= Gearóid Ryan =

Irish hurler

Personal information
- Native name: Gearóid Ó Riain (Irish)
- Born: 26 August 1988 (age 38) Nenagh, Ireland
- Occupation: Plumber
- Height: 1.75 m (5 ft 9 in)

Sport
- Sport: Hurling
- Position: Right Half Forward
Club
- Years: Club
- 2005-: Templederry Kenyons
Inter-county
Years	County	Apps (scores)
2009-2016	Tipperary	22 (2-24)
Inter-county titles
- Munster titles: 5
- All-Irelands: 2
- NHL: 0
- All Stars: 0

Gearóid Ryan (born 26 August 1988) is an Irish hurler who played as a midfielder for the Tipperary senior team.

Ryan made his first appearance for the team during the 2009 National League and has become a regular player over the last few seasons. During that time he has won two All-Ireland winners' medals and five Munster winners' medals.

At club level Ryan is a one-time county intermediate championship medalist with Templederry Kenyons.

== Playing career ==
=== Club ===
Ryan plays his club hurling with the Templederry Kenyons club and has enjoyed much success.

In 2008 the club claimed the North Tipperary title following a 0–17 to 1–10 defeat of Newport. It was Ryan's first silverware with the club. The Kenyons club later reached the county intermediate championship decider where Newport provided the opposition once again. The result was similar with Ryan adding a county intermediate title to his collection following a five-point victory. Ryan finished off the year by collecting a North Tipperary under-21 title.

=== Minor, intermediate and under-21 ===
Ryan first came to prominence on the inter-county scene as a member of the Tipperary minor hurling team in 2005. He enjoyed little success in his debut season, however, Tipperary reached the All-Ireland decider via the "back-door" in 2006. Three-in-a-row hopefuls Galway provided the opposition, however, Tipp powered to 2–18 to 2–7 victory. It was Ryan's sole All-Ireland medal in that grade.

Ryan subsequently joined the Tipperary under-21 team. He won a Munster medal in this grade in his debut season following a controversial one-point defeat of Clare. Tipp later reached the All-Ireland, however, Ryan's side were defeated by Kilkenny.

Ryan also enjoyed two unsuccessful seasons with the Tipperary intermediate hurling team.

=== Senior ===
Ryan made his senior competitive debut for Tipperary in a National Hurling League game against Cork in 2009. He made his championship debut against the same opposition later that same season, however, he remained on the periphery of the team.

By 2010 Ryan made his way onto the Tipperary starting fifteen. After losing to Cork in the first round of the championship, Tipperray regrouped in the qualifiers and went on to reach a second successive All-Ireland decider. Kilkenny, a team chasing a fifth successive championship, provided the opposition and a great game was expected. Tipperary got off to a great start which was bolstered by an early Lar Corbett goal. He subsequently completed a hat-trick of goals and Tipperary had a fourth by Noel McGrath to deny Kilkenny's drive-for-five and secure a remarkable and convincing 4–17 to 1–18 victory. It was Ryan's first All-Ireland winners' medal.

Tipperary returned as provincial kingpins once again in 2011. A 7–19 to 0-19 trouncing of Waterford in the southern decider gave Ryan his first Munster medal. For the third successive year, Tipperary faced off against Kilkenny in the All-Ireland final, however, on this occasion Kilkenny were slight underdogs going up against the new champions. Kilkenny started quickly and never surrendered the lead in the 2–17 to 1–16 victory.

In spite of an indifferent National League campaign, Tipperary were regarded as potential All-Ireland champions once again. A 2–17 to 0–16 defeat of Waterford in the provincial decider gave Ryan a second successive Munster medal. Tipperary later faced a humiliating 4–24 to 1–15 defeat by eventual champions Kilkenny in the All-Ireland semi-final.

On 23 November 2016, Ryan announced his retirement from inter-county hurling. Persistent injuries, including a double hip-surgery in 2013, had hampered his fitness. In a statement he said "In recent years injuries have limited my ability to compete for a first 15 place and that has been a major factor in my decision. It has been a great honour for me to represent my county at senior level. I will greatly miss being involved with the Tipperary senior hurling panel all of whom I admire greatly. I have many great memories and made many lifelong friendships during my time on the panel. I want to thank all the players sincerely and I also want to thank the managers and backroom teams who gave me the honour of representing my county and were always very supportive of me."

== Honours ==
=== Team ===
Templederry-Kenyons

- Tipperary Intermediate Hurling Championship (1): 2008

Tipperary

- All-Ireland Senior Hurling Championship (2): 2010, 2016
- Munster Senior Hurling Championship (5): 2009, 2011, 2012, 2015, 2016
- Munster Under-21 Hurling Championship (1): 2008
- All-Ireland Minor Hurling Championship (1): 2006

Individual

- GAA GPA All Stars Awards Nomination (2): 2010, 2011
