= Seán Curran (hurler) =

Irish hurler

Personal information
- Native name: Seán Ó Curraoin (Irish)
- Born: 15 September 1991 (age 35) Clonmel, Ireland
- Occupation: Student
- Height: 1.85 m (6 ft 1 in)

Sport
- Sport: Hurling
- Position: Right half forward
Club
- Years: Club
- 2008-: Mullinahone
Inter-county
Years	County	Apps (scores)
2012-	Tipperary	1 (0-0)
Inter-county titles
- Munster titles: 2
- All-Irelands: 1

Seán Curran (born 15 September 1991) is an Irish hurler who currently plays for the Tipperary senior team. He made his senior debut during the 2012 National League.

Curran was part of the Tipperary Senior hurling team panel in 2016, and made his Championship debut on 22 May 2016 against Cork in the Munster Championship quarter-final win, starting at right half forward in the 0–22 to 0–13 win.

== Honours ==
- All-Ireland Senior Hurling Championship (1): 2016
- Munster Senior Hurling Championship (2): 2012, 2016
