= John McGrath (Tipperary hurler) =

Irish hurler and Gaelic footballer

Personal information
- Native name: Seán Mac Craith (Irish)
- Born: 28 July 1994 (age 32) Loughmore, County Tipperary, Ireland
- Occupation: Postman
- Height: 1.83 m (6 ft 0 in)

Sport
- Sport: Hurling
- Position: Full-forward
Club
- Years: Club
- 2011–: Loughmore–Castleiney
Club titles
	Football	Hurling
Tipperary titles	6	4
College
- Years: College
- 2013–2018: University of Limerick
College titles
- Fitzgibbon titles: 2
Inter-county*
Years	County	Apps (scores)
2015–	Tipperary	49 (22-79)
Inter-county titles
- Munster titles: 2
- All-Irelands: 3
- NHL: 0
- All Stars: 2
- *Inter County team apps and scores correct as of match played 24 May 2026.

John McGrath (born 28 July 1994) is an Irish hurler and Gaelic footballer who plays for Tipperary Senior Championship club Loughmore–Castleiney and at inter-county level with the Tipperary senior hurling team. He usually lines out as a right corner-forward.

== Playing career ==
=== Our Lady's Secondary School ===
McGrath first came to prominence as a hurler with Our Lady's Secondary School in Templemore. He played in every grade of hurling before eventually joining the college's senior hurling team. On 24 February 2013, McGrath top scored with 0-05 for the team when they suffered a 2–21 to 1–11 defeat by Dungarvan Colleges in the Harty Cup final.

=== University of Limerick ===
As a student at the University of Limerick, McGrath joined the senior hurling team during his second year. On 1 March 2015, he was selected at right wing-forward when UL faced the Waterford Institute of Technology in the Fitzgibbon Cup final. McGrath spent much of the game at centre-forward and top scored for UL with 0–05 in the 0–21 to 3–12 draw. He was switched to full-forward for the replay on 11 March. McGrath ended the game with 0-06 and collected a winners' medal following the 2–18 to 1–14 defeat.

McGrath lined out in a second successive Fitzgibbon Cup final on 27 February 2016. He was selected at right corner-forward but spent much of the game at centre-forward and scored 2–07 in the 1–30 to 3–22 defeat by Mary Immaculate College.

On 24 February 2018, McGrath lined out in a third Fitzgibbon Cup final when UL faced DCU Dóchas Éireann. He scored two points from right corner-forward and collected a second winners' medal following a 2–21 to 2–15 victory.

=== Loughmore–Castleiney ===
McGrath joined the Loughmore–Castleiney club at a young age and played in all grades at juvenile and underage levels, enjoying championship success in the minor and under-21 grades.

On 13 October 2013, McGrath lined out at right wing-forward against Nenagh Éire Óg in his first Tipperary Hurling Championship final. He was held scoreless throughout but ended the game with a winners' medal following the 1–17 to 1–16 victory. On 3 November 2013, McGrath lined out in his second final of the year when Loughmore–Castleiney faced Aherlow Gaels in the Tipperary Football Championship final. He top scored with 1-09 from midfield in the 3–10 to 0–09 victory.

On 2 November 2014, McGrath lined out in a second successive Tipperary Hurling Championship final. He scored 1-01 from right wing-forward in the 2–22 to 3–11 defeat by Thurles Sarsfields. McGrath lined out in a second successive Tipperary Football Championship final on 21 December 2014. He scored 0-02 from frees in the 2–07 to 1–10 draw with Cahir. McGrath top scored with 0–04 in the replay on 26 December 2014 and collected a second successive winners' medal following a 0–09 to 2–02 victory.

McGrath lined out in a third Tipperary Football Championship final in four seasons on 30 October 2016. He scored a point from midfield and ended the game with a third winners' medal following a 1–09 to 1–06 defeat of Moyle Rovers.

McGrath won his fourth Tipperary Senior Football Championship and second Tipperary Senior Hurling Championship in the space of a week as his club, Loughmore–Castleiney, completed the Tipperary double for the second time in November 2021. He scored the winning goal in the football final versus Clonmel Commercials and the winning point against Thurles Sarsfields. He was awarded the man of the match award in the hurling and football quarter-finals, semi-finals as well as the hurling drawn final and football final.

=== Tipperary ===
==== Minor and under-21 ====
McGrath was just 15-years-old when he was selected for the Tipperary minor hurling team prior to the start of the 2010 Munster Championship. He was an unused substitute during Tipperary's 0–17 to 1–13 defeat by Clare on 5 May 2010.

McGrath became a dual player during the 2011 Munster Championships. On 3 July, he was an unused substitute with the Tipperary minor football team when they defeated Cork by 3–11 to 1–09 to win the Munster Championship. On 18 September 2011, McGrath was selected at centre-forward when Tipperary faced Dublin in the All-Ireland final. He was substituted at half-time but ended the game with a winners' medal following the 3–09 to 1–14 victory.

McGrath was again eligible for the minor grade in 2012 and retained his status as a dual player. On 8 July 2012, he won a second successive Munster Championship with the Tipperary minor football team after coming on as a 55th-minute substitute in the 2–14 to 1–14 defeat of Kerry in the final. On 15 July 2012, McGrath lined out at midfield when the Tipperary minor hurling team faced Clare in the Munster final. He top scored with 0-07, including three from frees, and collected a winners' medal following the 1–16 to 1–12 victory. McGrath again lined out at midfield when Tipperary faced Dublin in the All-Ireland final. He top scored with 1–07 in the 2–13 to 1–16 draw. McGrath was again the top scorer with 0–10 in the replay on 30 September 2012. He ended the game with an All-Ireland medal following the 2–18 to 1–11 victory. McGrath was also Tipperary's top championship scorer with 2-46 from six games.

McGrath joined the Tipperary under-21 hurling panel in advance of the 2013 Munster Championship. He made his first appearance for the team on 17 July 2013 when he came on as a 35th-minute substitute in a 5–19 to 2–13 defeat of Cork. McGrath was once again introduced as a substitute when Tipperary suffered a 1–17 to 2–10 defeat by Clare in the Munster final on 7 August 2013.

McGrath was added to the Tipperary under-21 football team during the 2014 Munster Championship. On 9 April 2014, he lined out at right wing-forward when Tipperary suffered a 1–18 to 3–08 defeat by Cork in the Munster final.

For the second successive season, McGrath was a dual player at under-21 level with Tipperary in 2015. An injury ruled him out of the Munster final with the footballers against Cork on 9 April 2015, however, he claimed a winners' medal as an unused substitute following the 1–15 to 3–08 victory. On 2 May 2015, McGrath started the All-Ireland final against Tyrone on the bench. He came on in the 52nd minute in what was Tipperary's only substitution in the 1–11 to 0–13 defeat.

==== Senior ====
McGrath was added to the Tipperary senior team in advance of the 2015 National League. He made his first appearance for the team on 22 February 2015 when he scored 0-02 from left corner-forward in a 2–18 to 0–20 defeat of Galway. A chronic groin injury meant that McGrath was an unused substitute for Tipperary in the subsequent Championship. On 12 July 2015, he won a Munster Championship medal as a non-playing substitute following Tipperary's 0–21 to 0–16 defeat of Waterford in the Munster final.

On 22 May 2016, McGrath made his Munster Championship debut at left corner-forward in a 0–22 to 0–13 defeat of Cork. He was switched to right corner-forward for the Munster final against Waterford. McGrath scored 3-02, including a goal from a penalty, and collected a second successive winners' medal following the 5–19 to 0–13 victory. He retained his position at right corner-forward for the All-Ireland final against Kilkenny on 4 September 2016. McGrath ended the game with an All-Ireland medal after scoring 1–03 in a 2–29 to 2–20 victory. He ended the season by being named in the left corner-forward position on the All-Star team.

On 23 April 2017, McGrath lined out in his first National League final. He top scored for Tipperary with 0-06 from frees but ended on the losing side following a 3–21 to 0–14 victory for Galway.

McGrath played in a second successive National League final on 8 April 2018. Switched from corner-forward and lining out at left wing-forward, he scored 0-02 from play but ended on the losing side following a 2–23 to 2–17 defeat by Kilkenny.

On 30 June 2019, McGrath lined out at right corner-forward when Tipperary faced Limerick in the Munster final. He scored a 44th-minute goal to bring the sides level, however, he ended the game on the losing side after a 2–26 to 2–14 defeat. On 18 August 2019, McGrath was selected at left corner-forward when Tipperary faced Kilkenny in the All-Ireland final. He scored three points from play and ended the game with a second All-Ireland winners' medal following the 3–25 to 0–20 victory. McGrath ended the season by receiving an All-Star nomination.

On 20 July in the 2025 All-Ireland final, McGrath started in the full-forward line and scored 2–2 as Tipperary defeated Cork by 3–27 to 1-19 and claim a 29th All-Ireland title.

== Personal life ==
McGrath is the son of Pat McGrath who won an All-Ireland medal with Tipperary in 1989. His brother, Noel McGrath, is a four-time All-Ireland medalist and a current teammate on the Tipperary senior team. In December 2025, McGrath married his long-time partner, Kirsten McCormack.

== Career statistics ==
=== Club ===
==== Hurling ====
As of match played 5 September 2026

Team	Year	Tipperary		Munster		Total	
Team	Year	Apps	Score	Apps	Score	Apps	Score
Loughmore–Castleiney	2011	1	0-00	—		1	0-00
Loughmore–Castleiney	2012	3	0-12	—		3	0-12
Loughmore–Castleiney	2013	4	0-10	1	0-01	5	0-11
Loughmore–Castleiney	2014	7	3-17	—		7	3-17
Loughmore–Castleiney	2015	2	0-14	—		2	0-14
Loughmore–Castleiney	2016	2	0-16	—		2	0-16
Loughmore–Castleiney	2017	4	5-30	—		4	5-30
Loughmore–Castleiney	2018	5	3-33	—		5	3-33
Loughmore–Castleiney	2019	4	3-22	—		4	3-22
Loughmore–Castleiney	2020	6	1-64	—		6	1-64
Loughmore–Castleiney	2021	8	7-72	1	0-07	9	7-79
Loughmore–Castleiney	2022	—		—		0	0-00
Loughmore–Castleiney	2023	5	4-43	—		5	4-43
Loughmore–Castleiney	2024	6	1-60	1	0-09	6	1-60
Loughmore–Castleiney	2025	6	5-53	1	0-12	7	5-65
Loughmore–Castleiney	2026	4	3-35	—		4	3-35
Total		67	35-481	4	0-29	71	35-510

==== Football ====
As of match played 18 October 2026

Team	Year	Tipperary		Munster		Total	
Team	Year	Apps	Score	Apps	Score	Apps	Score
Loughmore–Castleiney	2011	1	0-00	—		1	0-00
Loughmore–Castleiney	2012	2	0-07	—		2	0-07
Loughmore–Castleiney	2013	7	2-28	1	1-04	8	3-32
Loughmore–Castleiney	2014	7	2-11	—		7	2-11
Loughmore–Castleiney	2015	3	0-00	—		3	0-00
Loughmore–Castleiney	2016	4	2-04	1	0-01	5	2-05
Loughmore–Castleiney	2017	4	0-04	—		4	0-04
Loughmore–Castleiney	2018	3	0-04	—		3	0-04
Loughmore–Castleiney	2019	5	1-02	—		5	1-02
Loughmore–Castleiney	2020	5	0-06	—		5	0-06
Loughmore–Castleiney	2021	6	3-05	1	0-03	7	3-08
Loughmore–Castleiney	2022	—		—		0	0-00
Loughmore–Castleiney	2023	4	0-00	—		4	0-00
Loughmore–Castleiney	2024	6	0-04	2	0-00	6	0-04
Loughmore–Castleiney	2025	4	1-02	—		4	1-02
Loughmore–Castleiney	2026	5	1-04	0	0-00	5	1-04
Total		66	12-81	5	1-08	71	13-89

=== Inter-county ===
Team	Year	National League			Munster		All-Ireland		Total	
Team	Year	Division	Apps	Score	Apps	Score	Apps	Score	Apps	Score
Tipperary	2015	Division 1A	3	0-07	0	0-00	0	0-00	3	0-07
Tipperary	2016	Division 1A	6	1-30	3	3-04	2	2-04	11	6-38
Tipperary	2017	Division 1A	6	5-21	1	1-01	4	4-10	11	10-32
Tipperary	2018	Division 1A	7	1-14	4	0-12	—		11	1-26
Tipperary	2019	Division 1A	5	0-02	5	2-13	3	0-05	13	2-20
Tipperary	2020	Division 1A	4	2-09	1	1-00	2	0-00	7	3-09
Tipperary	2021	Division 1A	4	1-05	1	0-00	1	0-02	6	1-07
Tipperary	2022	Division 1B	3	2-03	2	0-00	—		5	2-03
Tipperary	2023	Division 1B	4	0-09	4	0-02	2	2-01	10	2-12
Tipperary	2024	Division 1B	3	0-02	2	0-04	—		5	0-06
Tipperary	2025	Division 1A	4	0-03	4	4-06	4	3-10	12	7-19
Tipperary	2026	Division 1A	4	2-07	4	0-05	—		8	2-12
Total			53	14-112	31	11-47	18	11-32	102	36-191

== Honours ==
Loughmore–Castleiney

- Tipperary Senior Hurling Championship (4): 2013, 2021, 2024, 2025
- Tipperary Senior Football Championship (6): 2013, 2014, 2016, 2021, 2024, 2026
- Mid Tipperary Senior Hurling Championship (5): 2011, 2016, 2018, 2024, 2026
- Mid Tipperary Senior Football Championship (6): 2012, 2015, 2016, 2017, 2018, 2023

University of Limerick

- Fitzgibbon Cup (2): 2015, 2018

Tipperary

- All-Ireland Senior Hurling Championship (3): 2016, 2019, 2025
- Munster Senior Hurling Championship (2): 2015, 2016
- Munster Under 21 Football Championship (1): 2015
- All-Ireland Minor Hurling Championship (1): 2012
- All-Ireland Minor Football Championship (1): 2011
- Munster Minor Hurling Championship (1): 2012
- Munster Minor Football Championship (2): 2011, 2012

Individual

- All Star Award (2): 2016, 2025
- Munster GAA Senior Hurler of the Year (1): 2016
- The Sunday Game Team of the Year (2): 2016, 2025
- GAA/GPA Hurler of the Year (1): 2025
