= Sean Ryan (Tipperary hurler) =

Irish hurler

Sport
- Sport: Hurling
- Position: Forward
Club
- Years: Club
- Templederry Kenyons
Club titles
- Tipperary titles: 0
Inter-county*
Years	County	Apps (scores)
2023 -	Tipperary	0 (0-00)
Inter-county titles
- Munster titles: 0
- All-Irelands: 0
- NHL: 0
- All Stars: 0
- *Inter County team apps and scores correct as of 1.

Sean Ryan is an Irish hurler who plays club hurling for Templederry Kenyons and at inter-county level with the Tipperary senior hurling team.

== Career ==
On 4 February 2023, Ryan made his league debut for Tipperary in the opening round of the 2023 National Hurling League against Laois as Tipperary won by 2–32 to 0–18.
