= Alan Tynan =

Irish hurler

Personal information
- Born: 9 July 1997 (age 29)

Sport
- Sport: Hurling
- Position: Wing-forward
Club
- Years: Club
- Roscrea
Club titles
- Tipperary titles: 0
Inter-county
Years	County	Apps (scores)
2021–	Tipperary	16 (0-18)
Inter-county titles
- Munster titles: 0
- All-Irelands: 1
- NHL: 0
- All Stars: 0

Alan Tynan (born 9 July 1997) is an Irish hurler and footballer who plays club hurling for Roscrea and at inter-county level with the Tipperary senior hurling team. He previously played rugby with the Munster academy and was also part of the Tipperary minor football team that played in the 2015 All-Ireland Minor Football Final.

== Career ==
On 12 February 2023, he made his league debut for Tipperary in the second round of the 2023 National Hurling League against Kilkenny, scoring a point as Tipperary won by 2–24 to 1–21.

On 20 July in the 2025 All-Ireland final, Tynan came on as a substitute as Tipperary defeated Cork by 3-27 to 1-19 and claimed a 29th All-Ireland title.

== Career statistics ==
(Championship only) As of match played 20 July 2025

Team	Year	National League			Munster		All-Ireland		Total	
Team	Year	Division	Apps	Score	Apps	Score	Apps	Score	Apps	Score
Tipperary	2021	Division 1A			—		—		—	
Tipperary	2022	Division 1B			—		—		—	
Tipperary	2023	Division 1B			4	0-06	2	0-05	6	0-11
Tipperary	2024	Division 1B			4	0-05	—		4	0-05
Tipperary	2025	Division 1A			3	0-01	3	0-01	6	0-02
Career total					11	0-12	5	0-06	16	0-18

== Honours ==
Tipperary

- All-Ireland Senior Hurling Championship (1): 2025,
