= Michael Heffernan (hurler) =

Irish sportsperson

Personal information
- Born: 30 December 1989 (age 36)
- Occupation: Student
- Height: 5 ft 11 in (180 cm)

Sport
- Sport: Hurling
- Position: Forward
Club
- Years: Club
- 2005-: Nenagh Éire Óg
Inter-county
Years	County	Apps (scores)
2010-present	Tipperary	1 (0-00)
Inter-county titles
- Munster titles: 0
- All-Irelands: 1 (1 as sub)
- NHL: 0

Michael Heffernan is an Irish sportsperson. He plays hurling with his local club Nenagh Éire Óg and with the Tipperary senior inter-county team.

== Career ==
Heffernan won two All-Ireland Minor Hurling medals in 2006 and 2007. He made his National Hurling League debut as a substitute against Limerick in 2010, scoring a point from play. He went on to make his Championship debut on 3 July 2010 against Wexford in the 2010 All-Ireland Senior Hurling Championship Qualifiers.

On 28 July 2010, Heffernan played at corner forward, scoring 1-3 for Tipperary as they defeated Clare in the 2010 Munster Under-21 Hurling final at Semple Stadium, winning by 1–22 to 1–17.

On 5 September 2010, Heffernan was a non-playing substitute as Tipperary won their 26th All Ireland title, beating reigning champions Killkenny by 4–17 to 1–18 in the final, preventing Kilkenny from achieving an historic 5-in-a-row, it was Heffernan's first All-Ireland winners medal. Six day's later on 11 September 2010, Tipperary clinched the All Ireland Under-21 title by defeating Galway by 5–22 to 0–12 at Semple Stadium, with Heffernan starting at corner forward scoring two points.

In 2012, Heffernan was part of the Tipperary team that won the Munster Intermediate Hurling Championship and the All-Ireland Intermediate Hurling Championship. He started the All-Ireland final at full forward and scored one goal and four points in the 3–13 to 1–17 victory against Kilkenny at Semple Stadium. Heffernan created a piece of history by adding the All-Ireland Intermediate medal (2012) to the Minor (2006, 2007), Under-21 (2010) and Senior (2010) titles that he had already won.

== Honours ==
=== Tipperary ===
- All-Ireland Senior Hurling Championship:
  - Winner (1): 2010
- All-Ireland Under-21 Hurling Championship:
  - Winner (1): 2010
- Munster Under-21 Hurling Championship:
  - Winner (1): 2010
- All-Ireland Minor Hurling Championship:
  - Winner (2): 2006, 2007
- Munster Minor Hurling Championship:
  - Winner (1): 2007
- All-Ireland Intermediate Hurling Championship:
  - Winner (1): 2012
- Munster Intermediate Hurling Championship:
  - Winner (1): 2012
