= Pauric Campion =

Irish hurler

Sport
- Sport: Hurling
- Position: Half-back
Club
- Years: Club
- Drom & Inch
Club titles
- Tipperary titles: 0
Inter-county
Years	County	Apps (scores)
2023 -	Tipperary	0 (0-00)
Inter-county titles
- Munster titles: 0
- All-Irelands: 0
- NHL: 0
- All Stars: 0

Pauric Campion is an Irish hurler who plays club hurling for Drom & Inch and at inter-county level with the Tipperary senior hurling team.

== Career ==
On 12 February 2023, he made his league debut for Tipperary in the second round of the 2023 National Hurling League against Kilkenny, as Tipperary won by 2–24 to 1–21.

== Honours ==
- All-Ireland Under-21 Hurling Championship: 2018
