= Kieran Morris =

Irish hurler

Sport
- Sport: Hurling
- Position: Corner-Forward
Club
- Years: Club
- Moycarkey–Borris
Inter-county
Years	County	Apps (scores)
2014–	Tipperary	0 (0-0)

Kieran Morris (born 14 June 1990) is an Irish sportsperson. He plays hurling with his local club Moycarkey-Borris and with the Tipperary senior inter-county team since 2014.

== Career ==
Morris was named in the Tipperary squad for the 2016 National Hurling League and made his league debut on 20 March against Cork, starting at right corner forward.

== Honours ==
Tipperary

- Munster Under-21 Hurling Championship (1): 2010
- All-Ireland Under-21 Hurling Championship (1): 2010
- All-Ireland Intermediate Hurling Championship (1): 2012
- Munster Intermediate Hurling Championship (1): 2012
- Waterford Crystal Cup (1): 2014
