= Cian Darcy =

Irish hurler

Personal information
- Born: County Tipperary, Ireland

Sport
- Sport: Hurling
- Position: Corner-forward
Club
- Years: Club
- Kilruane MacDonagh's
Club titles
- Tipperary titles: 1
Inter-county
- Years: County
- 2018–? ?–: Tipperary; Longford

Cian Darcy (born 23 April 1998) is a hurler who has played as a forward for the Tipperary and Longford senior teams. He plays his club hurling with Kilruane MacDonagh's.

== Career ==
Darcy made his senior debut for the Tipperary hurling team during the 2018 season, when he came on as a substitute in the second half of the 2018 National Hurling League second-round fixture against Waterford on 3 February.

He later played hurling for Longford. He was Player of the Year from the 2024 Lory Meagher Cup.

== Honours ==
Tipperary

- All-Ireland Under-21 Hurling Championship (1): 2018
- All-Ireland Minor Hurling Championship (1): 2016
- Munster Minor Hurling Championship (2):2015, 2016

Kilruane MacDonagh's

- Tipperary Senior Hurling Championship: 2022
