= Kiladangan GAA =

Gaelic games club in County Tipperary, Ireland

Kiladangan
- Cill An Daingin
- Founded: 1915
- County: Tipperary
- Colours: Blue and gold
- Grounds: Puckane
- Coordinates: 52°55′49.52″N 8°14′35.46″W

Playing kits
Standard colours

Senior Club Championships
	All Ireland	Munster champions	Tipperary champions
Hurling:	-	-	2

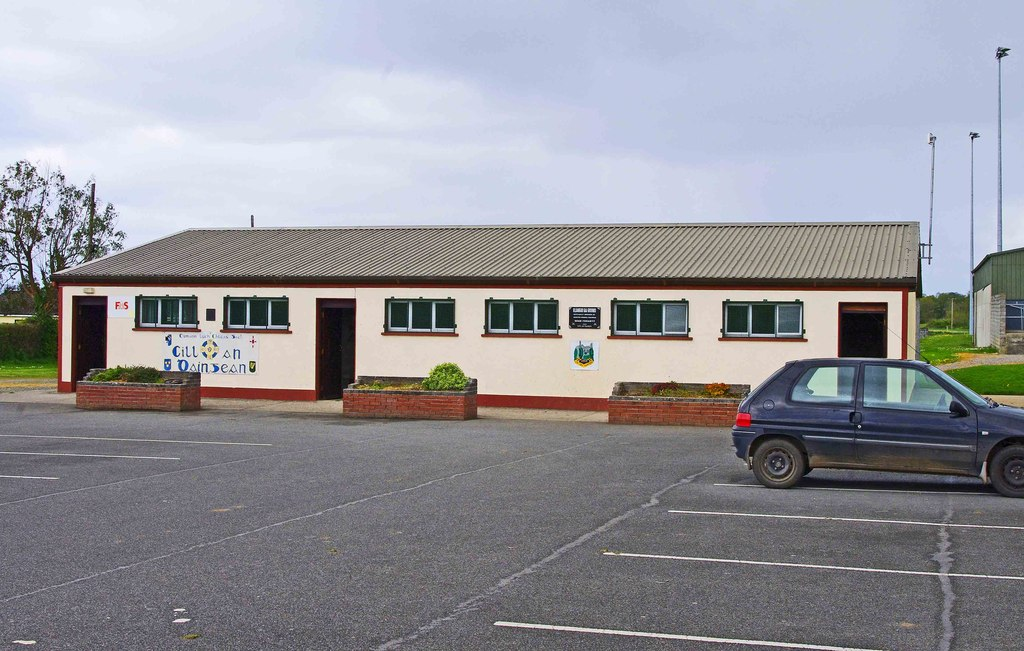
Grounds

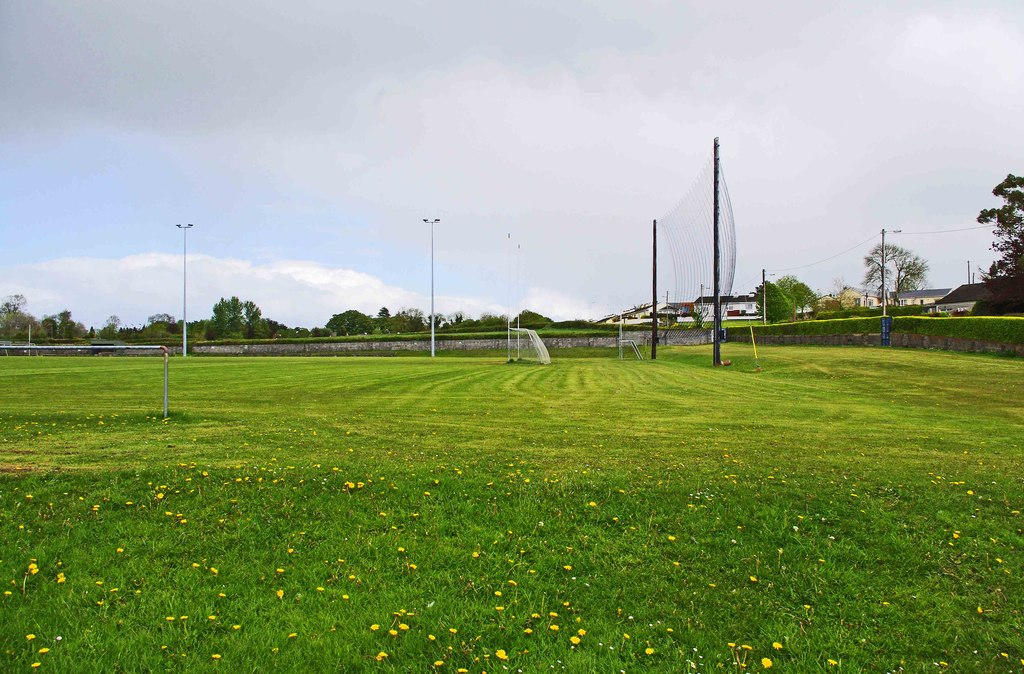
Field

Kiladangan GAA is a Tipperary GAA club which is located in County Tipperary, Ireland. Hurling is the main sport which is played in the North Tipperary divisional competitions. The club is centred on the village of Puckane but includes the areas of Ballycommon, Monsea and Dromineer near Nenagh.

Kiladangan was formerly spelled "Kildangan", however in January 2016 the club reverted to its former name of Kiladangan GAA. Currently, both club names are used interchangeably.

== Hurling club history ==
From the foundation of the club in 1915, teams competed in the various championships in County Tipperary – Senior, Intermediate and Junior under various guises, namely Kiladangan, Kildangan, Ballycommon, Carney, Knigh and Lahorna.

In 1930, Kiladangan and Kilbarron combined to win the intermediate championship, the amalgamation competed at senior level then until they won the senior championship in 1934. From then Kiladangan went on their own competing at senior level from 1935 to 1965 inclusive.

In 1966, Kiladangan went down to intermediate again before swiftly returning to the senior ranks in 1967. However, a return to intermediate ranks in 1968 before amalgamating with Burgess to form Na Piarsaigh and compete in the senior ranks in 1970.

Kiladangan competed on their own in the senior ranks once again in 1972 before returning to the intermediate ranks again in 1976 where they remained, except for 1996 when they competed in the junior championship, until 2005.

The return to the senior ranks in 2005 was preceded by capturing the county intermediate title, Munster intermediate cup and the all-Ireland intermediate cup beating Carrickshock of Kilkenny in a dramatic final in Thurles. The club confirmed the return to top tier by capturing the clubs first North Senior title in 65 years in 2008.

Kildangan reached the final of the 2016 Tipperary Senior Hurling Championship where they lost to Thurles Sarsfields by 1–15 to 0–27. It was their first final since 1938. They were back in the final again in 2019 but again lost out to Borris-Ileigh 1-15 to 1-12.

On 20 September 2020, Kiladangan won the 2020 Tipperary Senior Hurling Championship after a 1-28 to 3-20 extra-time defeat of Loughmore-Castleiney in the final at Semple Stadium. A late goal by Bryan McLoughney in extra-time won he game with Kiladangan one point behind at that stage. This was their first ever championship title.

On 29 October 2023, Kiladangan defeated Thurles Sarsfields by 1-21 to 1-20 after a replay to win their second Tipperary Senior Hurling Championship.

Over the years, many players from the club have represented Tipperary at various grades and the following is a list of players that have won All- Ireland medals in the blue and gold:

Senior Hurling:

- Marin Kennedy 1925, 1930 * (Martin also collected 6 railway cup medals in 1928, 1929, 1930, 1931, 1934 and 1935 and was selected at full forward on the Tipperary team of the millennium)
- Jimmy Kennedy 1949, 1950, 1951** (Jimmy also won a Railway Cup medal in 1950)
- Billy McLoughney 1961
- Seamus Hogan 1971
- Darragh Egan 2010
- Barry Hogan 2025
- Willie Connors 2025

Intermediate Hurling:

- Jim Egan 1972
- John D’Arcy 1972
- Nicky Flannery 1972
- Paddy Kelly 1972
- Ollie Killeen 1972
- Terry Moloney 1972
- William Moloney 1972
- Noel Seymour 1972
- Dan Hackett 2000

Junior Hurling:

- Éamonn Kelly 1989, 1991
- Donal Flannery 1989
- Colm Egan 1989

Under 21 Hurling:

- Seamus Hogan 1967
- Colm Egan 1989
- Éamonn Kelly 1989
- Brian Flannery 1995
- Joe Gallagher 2010

Minor Hurling:

- Neddy McLoughney 1952
- Joe Gallagher 2007

=== Notable Footballers ===
- Niall Kelly
- Willie Connors

== Honours ==
=== Adult Titles ===
Hurling

- Tipperary Senior Hurling Championships: (2) 2020, 2023
- All-Ireland Intermediate Club Hurling Championship: (1) 2005
- Munster Intermediate Club Hurling Championship: (1) 2004
- North Tipperary Senior Hurling Championship: (11) 1934 (with Kilbarron), 1938, 1943, 2008, 2013, 2015, 2016, 2019, 2021, 2024, 2025
- Tipperary Intermediate Hurling Championship: (1) 2004
- North Tipperary Intermediate Hurling Championship: (8) 1930 (as Kilbarron-Kildangan), 1966, 1971, 1977, 1980, 2001, 2002, 2004
- Tipperary Junior A Hurling Championship: (1) 1971
- North Tipperary Junior A Hurling Championship: (1) 1944
- Tipperary Junior B Hurling Championship: (1) 2006
- North Tipperary Junior B Hurling Championship: (3) 2001, 2006,2021
- North Tipperary Junior C Hurling Championship : (1) 2021

Football

- North Tipperary Intermediate Football Championship: (5) 1999, 2000, 2003, 2007, 2008
- Tipperary Junior A Football Championship: (3) 1990, 2011, 2024
- North Tipperary Junior A Football Championship (6) 1990, 1998, 2011, 2022, 2023, 2024
- Tipperary Junior B Football Championship (1) 1997
- North Tipperary Junior B Football Championship (1) 1997

=== Juvenile Titles ===
Hurling

- Tipperary Under-21 A Hurling Championship (4) 1970 and 1971 (Both as Naomh Padraig), 2017, 2019
- North Tipperary Under-21 A Hurling Championship (6) 1959, 1970 and 1971 (Both as Naomh Padraig), 2014, 2017, 2019
- Tipperary Under-21 B Hurling Championship (2) 2004, 2010
- North Tipperary Under-21 B Hurling Championship (5) 1999, 2004, 2008, 2010, 2012
- North Tipperary Minor A Hurling Championship (3) 2015, 2018, 2019
- Tipperary Minor B Hurling Championship (2) 1998, 2014
- North Tipperary Minor B Hurling Championship (4) 1982, 1998, 2003, 2014

Football

- North Tipperary Under-21 A Football Championship (3) 1999, 2000, 2011
- North Tipperary Under-21 B Football Championship (3) 1987, 1988, 1996
- North Tipperary Minor A Football Championship (2) 1996, 2008
- North Tipperary Minor B Football Championship (4) 1987, 1992, 2011, 2013

== Camogie History ==
The re-established Kildangan Camogie Club first fielded an U/12 team in the championship in 2002. An U/14 team found their feet that year playing challenge games for experience. From 2003 the club affiliated teams in the U/12 and U/14 league and championship. In 2006 they affiliated 5 teams at u/10s, u/12s, u/14s, and Junior B level. Currently the team compete at Junior A level.

=== Achievements ===
- Tipperary Junior B Hurling Championship: (1) 2009
- Tipperary Junior A Hurling League: (1) 2022
