= Aidan McCormack =

Irish hurler

Personal information
- Occupation: Soldier

Sport
- Sport: Hurling
- Position: Centre forward
Club
- Years: Club
- 2010-: Thurles Sarsfields
Club titles
- Tipperary titles: 7
- Munster titles: 1
Inter-county
Years	County	Apps (scores)
2016-	Tipperary	1 (0-01)
Inter-county titles
- Munster titles: 1
- All-Irelands: 1

Aidan McCormack (born 19 September 1992) is an Irish sportsperson. He plays hurling with his local club Thurles Sarsfields and with the Tipperary senior inter-county team since 2016.

== Career ==
McCormack was part of the Tipperary Minor hurling panel in 2010, and the Under-21 hurling panel from 2011 to 2013. At club level, he is a six-time county medallist and a one-time Munster club medallist with Thurles Sarsfields.

McCormack made his Championship debut on 10 July 2016 against Waterford in the 2016 Munster Final, coming on in the 66th minute and scoring a point.

In September 2016, was an unused substitute as Tipperary claimed their 27th All-Ireland Senior Hurling Championship with a 2–29 to 2–20 win over bitter rivals Kilkenny in the final.

McCormack made his starting debut on 11 February 2017 against Dublin in the 2017 National Hurling League.

== Honours ==
Tipperary

- Munster Senior Hurling Championship (1): 2016
- All-Ireland Senior Hurling Championship (1): 2016

Thurles Sarsfields

- Tipperary Senior Hurling Championship (7): 2010, 2012, 2014, 2015, 2016, 2017, 2026
- Munster Senior Club Hurling Championship (1): 2012
- Tipperary Under-21 Hurling Championship (2): 2012, 2013
- Tipperary Minor Hurling Championship (1): 2010
