= Puckane =

Puckane Irish: Pocán
- Village
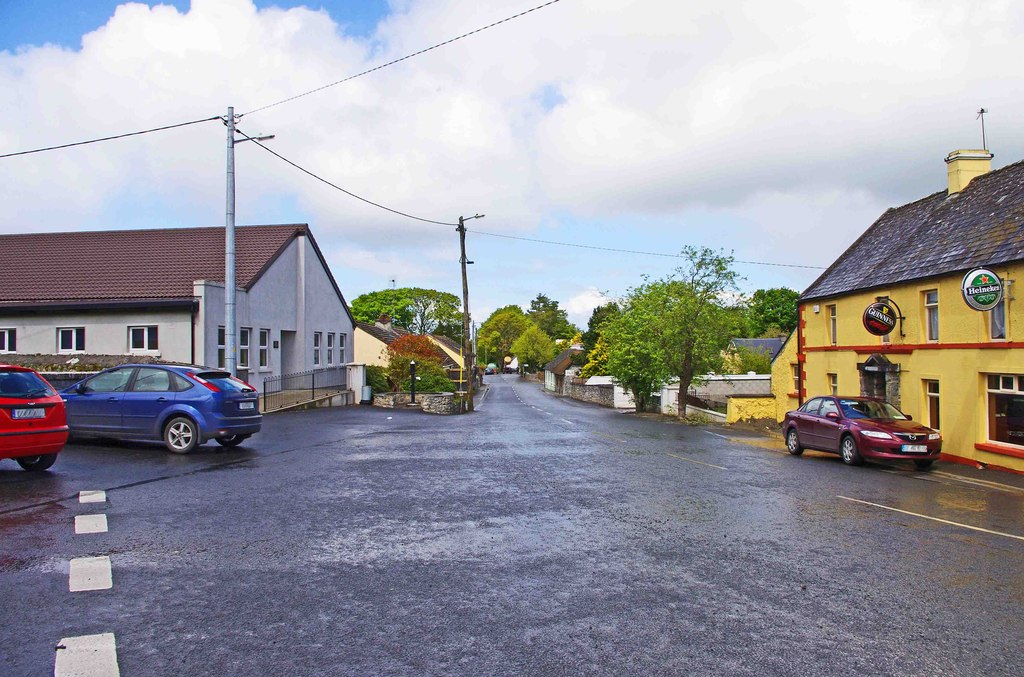
- Looking north on the R493 road at Puckaun

- Location in Ireland
- Coordinates: 52°55′49″N 8°14′18″W
- Country: Ireland
- Province: Munster
- County: County Tipperary

Population (2016)
  - Total: 250
- Time zone: UTC+0 (WET)
  - Summer (DST): UTC-1 (IST (WEST))

Puckane, officially Puckaun (Irish: Pocán), is a village in County Tipperary, Ireland. It is also a parish in the Roman Catholic Diocese of Killaloe. The village is located 10 km north of Nenagh along the R493 and close to Lough Derg and Dromineer. It had a population of 250 people as of the 2016 census.

== People ==
The songwriter Shane MacGowan spent much of his childhood in the neighbouring townland of Carney and has immortalised a number of local places in his songs such as "The Broad Majestic Shannon". The village was also mentioned in a well-known Christy Moore cover of Shane MacGowan and The Pogues song "The Fairy Tale of New York". A local landmark is "Paddy Kennedy's Pub". Ireland's 2015 Eurovision entrant Molly Sterling hails from Puckane.

== Literature ==
It should not be confused with the eponymous fictional village in Spike Milligan's novel Puckoon.

== Sport ==
Kildangan GAA is the local Gaelic Athletic Association club.

== Transport ==
Bus Éireann route 322 provides a service to and from Nenagh on Fridays. Rail services can be accessed at Nenagh railway station.

== See also ==
- List of towns and villages in Ireland
