= 2026 Tipperary Senior Hurling Championship =

- Dates: 24 July 2026 - 11 October 2026
- Teams: 16
- Sponsor: FBD Insurance
- Champions: Thurles Sarsfields (37th title); Conor Stakelum (captain); Pádraic Maher (manager)
- Runners-up: Moycarkey–Borris; Kieran Cummins (captain); Dennis Kelly (manager)
- Relegated: Mullinahone

Tournament statistics
- Matches played: 33
- Goals scored: 104 (3.15 per match)
- Points scored: 1376 (41.7 per match)
- Top scorer: Eddie Ryan (2-49)

Divisional Champions
- Mid: Loughmore–Castleiney
- North: Borris–Ileigh
- South: St Mary's
- West: Clonoulty–Rossmore

The 2026 Tipperary Senior Hurling Championship was the 135th staging of the Tipperary Senior Hurling Championship since its establishment by the Tipperary County Board in 1887.

The defending champions were Loughmore–Castleiney but they were defeated by Holycross–Ballycahill at the preliminary quarter-final stage.

Thurles Sarsfields were crowned champions for the 37th time, defeating Moycarkey–Borris by 1-19 to 1-11 in the final.

== Team changes ==
=== To Championship ===
Promoted from the Tipperary Premier Intermediate Hurling Championship

- Upperchurch–Drombane

=== From Championship ===
Relegated to the Tipperary Premier Intermediate Hurling Championship

- Lorrha–Dorrha

== Divisional championships ==
=== Mid ===
==== Bracket ====
Quarter-Finals; 26 & 28 June 2026
Thurles Sarsfields	0-26
Upperchurch–Drombane	0-17
Holycross–Ballycahill (a.e.t.)	2-27
Drom & Inch	0-30
JK Brackens (p)	2-30 (5)
Moycarkey–Borris	3-27 (3)

Semi-Finals; 5 July 2026
Thurles Sarsfields	0-17
Holycross–Ballycahill	2-21
Loughmore–Castleiney	3-23
JK Brackens	0-24

Final; 12 July 2026
Holycross–Ballycahill	0-25
Loughmore–Castleiney (a.e.t.)	1-29

==== Final ====
12 July 2026 Final	Holycross–Ballycahill	0-25 – 1-29 (a.e.t.)	Loughmore–Castleiney	Boherlahan
15:00	Darragh Woods 0-12 (6f), Robbie Ryan and Tadhg Ryan 0-3 each, Cathal O'Reilly and Joe Caesar 0-2 each, Eoin Craddock, Liam Doyle and Jimmie Lahart 0-1 each	Report	John McGrath 0-15 (11f), Liam Treacy 1-3, Noel McGrath 0-4, Ciaran Connolly, Ciaran McCormack (1sl) and Ed Connolly 0-2 each, Liam McGrath 0-1	Referee: Kevin Jordan

=== North ===
==== Bracket ====
Quarter-Finals; 20 & 21 June 2026
Toomevara	2-18
Nenagh Éire Óg	2-23
Kilruane MacDonaghs	1-21
Roscrea	1-26

Semi-Finals; 4 & 5 July 2026
Nenagh Éire Óg (a.e.t.)	1-27
Roscrea	1-21
Kiladangan	1-14
Borris–Ileigh	2-23

Final; 12 July 2026
Nenagh Éire Óg	3-25
Borris–Ileigh (a.e.t.)	2-29

==== Final ====
12 July 2026 Final	Nenagh Éire Óg	3-25 – 2-29 (a.e.t.)	Borris–Ileigh	MacDonagh Park
16:00	Sam O'Farrell 0-11 (10f), Jake Morris 2-2 (1-0p, 1-0f), Ben West 1-0, Josh Keller 0-3, Jake Donelan Houlihan and Emmet Jones 0-2 each, Tommy Heffernan, Paddy Murphy, Conor Ryan, Jamie Cottrell and Mason Cawley 0-1 each	Report	Eddie Ryan 1-11 (0-8f, 0-1 65'), James Devaney 0-7, Jerry Kelly 0-6 (2sl), Paddy McCormack 1-0, Jack Bevans 0-2, Sean McCormack, Conor Kenny and Colm Boyle 0-1 each	Referee: Ciaran O'Donovan

=== South ===
==== Bracket ====
Semi-Finals; 4 & 5 July 2026		Final; 12 July 2026
Mullinahone	1-22
Carrick Swan	0-16	Mullinahone	0-17
St Mary's	3-17	St Mary's	1-16
Killenaule	0-19

==== Final ====
12 July 2026 Final	Mullinahone	0-17 – 1-16	St Mary's	Fethard
14:00	Michael Dunne 0-5 (2f), Martin Kehoe 0-4, Sam Rowan 0-3, Enda Keane (1sl) and Eoin Fennelly 0-2 each, Seán Curran 0-1	Report	Joe Higgins 1-1, Ruairi Leahy 0-4 (4f), Enda Dunphy (3f) and Aaron Cagney 0-3 each, Darragh O'Connor, Tadgh Condon, Thomas Charles, Harry Lawlor and Conor Deely 0-1 each	Referee: Sean Lonergan

=== West ===
==== Final ====
11 July 2026 Final	Cashel King Cormacs	1-16 – 1-20	Clonoulty–Rossmore	Dundrum
19:00	Ger Browne 1-1, Cathal Quinn and Eoghan Connolly (2f) 0-4 each, Devon Ryan 0-3 (2f), Ross Bonnar 0-2, Shane Neville and Ronan Connolly 0-1 each	Report	Stephen Ferncombe 0-13 (11f), Mikie Ryan W 1-1, Cathal Bourke 0-4, Jack Ryan and Donnacha Quirke 0-1 each	Referee: Cian Ryan

== Group stage ==
The draw for the group stage took place on 2 April 2026.

Advance to quarter-finals
Advance to preliminary-quarter-finals
Advance to preliminary-quarter-final and possible relegation semi-final
Advance to relegation semi-finals

=== Group 1 ===
Team	Matches				Score			Pts
Team	Pld	W	D	L	For	Against	Diff	Pts
Thurles Sarsfields	3	3	0	0	4-73	7-47	+17	6
Holycross–Ballycahill	3	2	0	1	4-66	4-56	+10	4
Kilruane MacDonaghs	3	1	0	2	5-56	4-68	-9	2
Upperchurch–Drombane	3	0	0	3	4-52	2-76	-18	0

==== Results ====
25 July 2026 Round 1	Thurles Sarsfields	0-28 – 3-13	Upperchurch–Drombane	Holycross
19:00	Conor Stakelum 0-6 (2f), Darragh Stakelum 0-5 (3f), Aidan McCormack 0-4 (4f), Daniel Rossiter, Kieran Rossiter, Keith Loughnane, Aidan Stakelum and Euan Murray 0-2 each, Eoin Purcell, Paddy Creedon and Denis Maher 0-1 each	Report	Pat Ryan 0-6 (5f), Gavin Ryan 1-2 (1-0p, 0-2f), Philip O'Dwyer 1-1, Paul Shanahan 1-0, Sean Ryan, Sean Griffin, Aaron Ryan and Loughlin Ryan 0-1 each	Referee: Gerry Treacy

26 July 2026 Round 1	Kilruane MacDonaghs	2-18 – 1-22	Holycross–Ballycahill	Templemore
15:30	Willie Cleary 0-7 (4f, 1 65'), Kian O'Kelly 0-5, Thomas Cleary 1-1, Cian Darcy 1-0, Niall O'Meara 0-3, Shane Cleary 0-2	Report	Darragh Woods 0-8 (5f, 1sl), Robbie Ryan 0-5 (2f), Joe Caesar 1-0, Tiarnan Ryan 0-3, Bryan O'Mara 0-2, Tadhg Gould, James Doyle, Eoin Craddock and Jimmie Lahart 0-1 each	Referee: Michael Kennedy

8 August 2026 Round 2	Holycross–Ballycahill	2-16 – 2-18	Thurles Sarsfields	Boherlahan
14:15	Darragh Woods 0-11 (8f), Robbie Ryan 2-1, Tadhg Gould 0-2, Tiarnan Ryan and Jack Ryan 0-1 each	Report	Aidan McCormack 1-8 (0-5f), Eoin Purcell 1-2, Paddy Creedon, Euan Murray and Darragh Stakelum 0-2 each, Conor Stakelum (1f) and Aidan Stakelum 0-1 each	Referee: Sean Lonergan

9 August 2026 Round 2	Kilruane MacDonaghs	1-20 – 1-19	Upperchurch–Drombane	Templederry
18:30	Willie Cleary 0-10 (7f, 1 65'), Niall O'Meara 0-5, Thomas Cleary 1-1, Shane Cleary, Craig Morgan, Cormac Kennedy and Cian Darcy 0-1 each	Report	Pat Ryan 0-8 (6f), Conor Fahey 1-3, Gavin Ryan 0-3 (3f), Philip O'Dwyer 0-2, Keith Ryan, Paul Shanahan and Aaron Ryan 0-1 each	Referee: Cian Ryan

22 August 2026 Round 3	Kilruane MacDonaghs	2-18 – 2-27	Thurles Sarsfields	Templederry
18:30	Willie Cleary 1-11 (0-9f), Niall O'Meara 1-0, Kian O'Kelly, Cian Darcy and Mark O'Neill 0-2 each, Michael Cleary 0-1	Report	Aidan McCormack 0-10 (9f), Darragh Stakelum 1-6, Paddy Creedon 1-2, Cian Stakelum 0-3, Aidan Stakelum and Eoin Purcell 0-2 each, Tommy Maher and Conor Stakelum 0-1 each	Referee: Conor Doyle

22 August 2026 Round 3	Holycross–Ballycahill	1–28 – 0-20	Upperchurch–Drombane	Borrisoleigh
18:30	Darragh Woods 1-8 (0-5f), Tiarnan Ryan 0-4, Eoin Craddock and Robbie Ryan 0-3 each, Evan Morris and David Fogarty 0-2 each, Bryan O'Mara, Tadhg Gould, James Doyle, Ben Hennessy, Jimmie Lahart and Jack Dwan 0-1 each	Report	Philip O'Dwyer 0-5, Pat Ryan 0-4 (2f), Aaron Ryan and Paddy Phelan 0-3 each, Gavin Ryan 0-2 (2f), Toby Corbett, Sean Griffin and Diarmuid Grant 0-1 each	Referee: Kevin Jordan

=== Group 2 ===
Team	Matches				Score			Pts
Team	Pld	W	D	L	For	Against	Diff	Pts
Moycarkey–Borris	3	3	0	0	6-54	3-51	+12	6
Borris–Ileigh	3	1	0	2	6-60	6-62	-2	2
Loughmore–Castleiney	3	1	0	2	3-60	6-58	-7	2
Clonoulty–Rossmore	3	1	0	2	7-56	7-59	-3	2

==== Results ====
24 July 2026 Round 1	Loughmore–Castleiney	0-15 – 1-19	Moycarkey–Borris	Templetuohy
19:30	John McGrath 0-9 (6f), Ciaran Connolly 0-3, Ciaran McGrath, Ciaran McCormack and Philip O'Connell 0-1 each	Report	Kieran Morris 0-5 (5f), David Costigan 1-1, Killian Cantwell (3f) and Rhys Shelly (2f) 0-3 each, Niall Heffernan and Max Hackett 0-2 each, Bill Flanagan, Joe Maher and Rory Darmdody 0-1 each	Referee: Sean Lonergan

26 July 2026 Round 1	Borris–Ileigh	2-21 – 3-20	Clonoulty–Rossmore	The Ragg
16:00	Eddie Ryan 0-10 (7f), Paddy McCormack 1-2, Kieran Maher 1-0, James Devaney 0-3, Tommy Ryan and Conor Kenny 0-2 each, Jack Hogan and Jack Bevans 0-1 each	Report	Stephen Ferncombe 0-9 (7f), Robert Doyle and Jack Ryan 1-2 each, Stephen Quinn 1-0, Jamie Davern 0-3, Jimmy Ryan, Michael Ryan, John O'Keeffe and Cathal Bourke 0-1 each	Referee: Kevin Jordan

8 August 2026 Round 2	Borris–Ileigh	3-21 – 1-24	Loughmore–Castleiney	The Ragg
15:00	Eddie Ryan 1-16 (0-11f, 0-2 65', 1-0p), Paddy McCormack 1-2 (0-1sl), Jack Bevans 1-1, James Devaney and Conor Kenny 0-1 each	Report	John McGrath 0-11 (9f), Tomas McGrath 1-0, Eoin O'Connell and Ciaran McCormack (1sl) 0-3 each, Liam McGrath 0-2, Tommy Maher, John Meagher, Ed Connolly, Philip O'Connell and Ciaran Connolly 0-1 each	Referee: Ciaran O'Donovan

8 August 2026 Round 2	Clonoulty–Rossmore	2-18 – 3-17	Moycarkey–Borris	Boherlahan
16:00	Stephen Ferncombe 1-5 (0-5f), Jack Ryan 1-3, Cathal Bourke 0-5, Michael Ryan 0-2, Jimmy Maher, Jamie Davern and Stephen Quinn 0-1 each	Report	David Costigan 2-0, Kieran Morris 0-5 (2f), Killian Cantwell 0-4 (3f), Jack Hayes 1-0, Stephen Walsh 0-3, Rhys Shelly (1f), Niall Heffernan, Tom Hayes, Max Hackett and Joe Maher 0-1 each	Referee: Joseph Leahy

23 August 2026 Round 3	Clonoulty–Rossmore	2-18 – 2-21	Loughmore–Castleiney	Holycross
15:30	Stephen Ferncombe 0-9 (0-6f), Philip Kelleher 1-1, Cathal Bourke 1-0, Michael Ryan 0-2, Robert Doyle, John O'Keeffe, Jimmy Maher, Ronan Heffernan, Jack Ryan, and Stephen Quinn 0-1 each	Report	John McGrath 1-7 (0-3f), Liam McGrath 0-6 (4f), Ciaran McCormack 1-0, Philip O'Connell 0-3, Ed Connolly 0-2, Brian McGrath, Ciaran Connolly and Noel McGrath 0-1 each	Referee: Alan Tierney

23 August 2026 Round 3	Borris–Ileigh	1-18 – 2-18	Moycarkey–Borris	The Ragg
15:30	Eddie Ryan 0-13 (12f), James Devaney 1-2, Sean McCormack, Paddy McCormack and Conor Kenny 0-1 each	Report	Kieran Morris 1-3 (0-3f), Rhys Shelly 1-2 (1-0p, 0-2f), Killian Cantwell (2f, 1 65') and David Costigan 0-3 each, Max Hackett and Joe Egan 0-2 each, Stephen Walsh, Rory Darmody and Kevin O'Regan 0-1 each	Referee: Shane O'Neill

==== Tiebreaker ====
Team	Matches				Score			Pts
Team	Pld	W	D	L	For	Against	Diff	Pts
Borris–Ileigh	2	1	0	1	5-42	4-44	+1	2
Loughmore–Castleiney	2	1	0	1	3-45	5-39	0	2
Clonoulty–Rossmore	2	1	0	1	5-38	4-42	-1	2

=== Group 3 ===
Team	Matches				Score			Pts
Team	Pld	W	D	L	For	Against	Diff	Pts
Cashel King Cormacs	3	3	0	0	4-85	6-71	+8	6
Kiladangan	3	2	0	1	7-68	4-67	+10	4
Drom & Inch	3	1	0	2	2-74	3-77	-6	2
Roscrea	3	0	0	3	4-64	4-76	-12	0

==== Results ====
25 July 2026 Round 1	Kiladangan	2-23 – 0-21	Roscrea	Cloughjordan
19:00	Billy Seymour 0-9 (4f), Seán Hayes 1-4, Bryan McLoughney 1-2, Tadhg Gallagher 0-3, Dara O'Dwyer 0-2, Alan Flynn, Darren Moran and Willie Connors 0-1 each	Report	Luke Cashin 0-9 (4f), Shane Fletcher 0-4 (4f), Alan Tynan, Leigh Loughnane and Evan Fitzpatrick 0-2 each, Darragh Tynan and Jack Lee 0-1 each	Referee: Conor Doyle

26 July 2026 Round 1	Drom & Inch	0-28 – 0-32	Cashel King Cormacs	Littleton
13:00	Séamus Callanan 0-9 (9f), Cormac Fitzpatrick 0-6, John Campion and Tony Cahill 0-4 each, Johnny Ryan 0-3, David Collins and Lorcan Campion 0-1 each	Report	Devon Ryan 0-8 (5f), Eoghan Connolly 0-6 (4f, 1sl), Oisín O'Donoghue 0-4 (1sl), Conor O'Dwyer, Ross Bonnar and Ger Browne 0-3 each, Shane Neville 0-2, James Cummins, Cathal Quinn and Daniel Moloney 0-1 each	Referee: Alan Tierney

8 August 2026 Round 2	Drom & Inch	1-23 – 1-22	Roscrea	Templemore
15:00	Séamus Callanan 0-9 (6f), Tony Cahill 1-0, Robbie Long and John Campion 0-3 each, Cormac Fitzpatrick 0-2, Fintan Purcell, Lorcan Campion, Maidhc Fitzpatrick, Johnny Ryan, David Collins and Paudie Kinnane 0-1 each	Report	Shane Fletcher 0-10 (8f), Jack Lee 1-0, Luke Cashin 0-3 (3f), Dan Ryan, Leigh Loughnane and Conor Dooley 0-2 each, Darragh Tynan, Conor Sheedy and Kenny Lee 0-1 each	Referee: Shane O'Neill

8 August 2026 Round 2	Cashel King Cormacs	3-23 – 3-22	Kiladangan	Templemore
17:00	Devon Ryan 0-11 (7f), Ger Browne 1-3, David McGrath 1-1, Cathal Quinn 1-0, Oisín O'Donoghue 0-3, Conor O'Dywer 0-2, Eoghan Connolly (1f), Ross Bonnar and Dennis O'Callaghan 0-1 each	Report	Billy Seymour 1-9 (0-4f), Paul Flynn 1-5, Seán Hayes 1-1, Willie Connors (2f) and Conor Byrne 0-2 each, Alan Flynn, Tadhg Gallagher, Brian McLoughney and Neil Cahalan 0-1 each	Referee: Kevin Jordan

22 August 2026 Round 3	Cashel King Cormacs	1-30 – 3-21	Roscrea	Templemore
18:00	Devon Ryan 0-7 (4f), David McGrath 1-1, Ger Browne, Oisín O'Donoghue and Cathal Quinn 0-4 each, Eoghan Connolly 0-3 (1f, 1 65', 1 sl), Shane Neville and Conor O'Dwyer 0-2 each, Ross Bonnar, Denis O'Callaghan and Ronan Connolly 0-1 each	Report	Luke Cashin 1-7 (1-6f, 0-1 65'), Shane Fletcher 2-2 (0-1f), Leigh Loughnane 0-5, Darragh Tynan and Evan Fitzpatrick 0-2 each, Dan Ryan, Alan Tynan and Conor Dooley 0-1 each	Referee: John Dooley

22 August 2026 Round 3	Drom & Inch	1-23 – 2-23	Kiladangan	Dolla
18:00	Séamus Callanan 1-10 (0-6f, 0-2 65'), Maidhc Fitzpatrick 0-5, John Campion and Cormac Fitzpatrick 0-3 each, David Collins 0-2	Report	Billy Seymour 0-7 (6f, 1 65'), Dara O'Dwyer 2-0, Paul Flynn 0-6, Tadhg Gallagher, Bryan McLoughney and Johnny Horan 0-2 each, Willie Connors, Alan Flynn, Seán Hayes and Tom Boland 0-1 each	Referee: Michael Kennedy

=== Group 4 ===
Team	Matches				Score			Pts
Team	Pld	W	D	L	For	Against	Diff	Pts
JK Brackens	3	3	0	0	7-69	1-67	+20	6
Nenagh Éire Óg	3	2	0	1	6-64	6-52	+12	4
Toomevara	3	0	1	2	2-53	3-65	-15	1
Mullinahone	3	0	1	2	1-66	6-68	-17	1

==== Results ====
25 July 2026 Round 1	Nenagh Éire Óg	0-22 – 4-18	JK Brackens	Templederry
19:30	Sam O'Farrell 0-6 (6f), Barry Heffernan 0-5 (3f), Paddy Murphy and Filip McIntrye 0-2 each, Ben West, Jake Morris (1f), Josh Keller, Conor Ryan, Mason Cawley, Conor Hennessy and Mikey Heffernan 0-1 each	Report	Lyndon Fairbrother 0-10 (7f), Andrew Ormond, Shane Doyle and Eanna McBride 1-1 each, Jamie Ormond 0-4, Dean McEnroe 1-0, Ned Delaney 0-1	Referee: Shane O'Neill

26 July 2026 Round 1	Toomevara	0-20 – 0-20	Mullinahone	Dundrum
18:00	Kevin McCarthy 0-8 (6f), Adam Hall 0-3, Patrick Hackett 0-2, Josh McCarthy, Conor O'Farrell, Jack Ryan, Austin Duff, Paul Ryan, Eoin Grace and Mark McCarthy (1sl) 0-1 each	Report	Micheal Dunne 0-12 (10f, 1 65'), Sam Rowan 0-3, Eoin O'Dwyer and Jack Shelly 0-2 each, Seán Curran 0-1	Referee: Cian Ryan

9 August 2026 Round 2	Toomevara	1-19 – 0-28	JK Brackens	The Ragg
16:00	Adam Hall 1-3, Darragh McCarthy 0-6 (6f), Jack Delaney 0-4, Kevin McCarthy 0-3 (1f), Austin Duff 0-2, Jack Ryan 0-1	Report	Jamie Ormond 0-9 (6f), Shane Doyle 0-5 (1sl), Andrew Ormond and Eanna McBride 0-3 each, Padraic O'Shea and Paddy Cadell 0-2 each, Michael Cahill, Ciaran O'Shea, Ned Walsh and Dean McEnroe 0-1 each	Referee: John Dooley

9 August 2026 Round 2	Mullinahone	1-20 – 3-25	Nenagh Éire Óg	Templetuohy
18:30	Micheal Dunne 0-11 (7f), Martin Kehoe 1-2, Sam Rowan 0-3, Seán Curran, Jack Shelley, Darragh Linnane and Enda Keane 0-1 each	Report	Ben West 2-2, Sam O'Farrell 0-8 (5f), Philip Hickey 1-2, Mikey Heffernan 0-3 (1f), Sean Phelan and Josh Keller 0-2 each, Paddy Murphy, Conor Hennessy, Filip McIntyre, Mark Carey, Barry Heffernan and Billy Moran 0-1 each	Referee: Conor Doyle

23 August 2026 Round 3	Nenagh Éire Óg	3-17 – 1-14	Toomevara	Cloughjordan
15:00	Jake Morris 2-4 (0-2f, 0-1 65'), Mikey Heffernan 0-8 (6f), Ben West 1-0, Conor Ryan 0-2, Sam O'Farrell, James Mackey and Sean Phelan 0-1 each	Report	Darragh McCarthy 0-11 (8f, 1 65'), Austin Duff 1-0, Barry O'Connell, Kevin McCarthy and Adam Hall 0-1 each	Referee: Ciaran O'Donovan

23 August 2026 Round 3	JK Brackens	3-23 – 0-26	Mullinahone	Cashel
15:00	Jamie Ormond 2-6 (0-3f), Andrew Ormond 0-7, Eanna McBride 1-1, Paddy Cadell, Ned Walsh and Ned Delaney 0-2 each, Michael Cahill, Shane Doyle and Padraic O'Shea 0-1 each	Report	Micheal Dunne 0-11 (7f), Martin Kehoe and Enda Keane (1sl) 0-5 each, Sam Rowan and Jack Shelly 0-2 each, Seán Curran 0-1	Referee: Willie Fitzharris
Note: The score was originally reported as JK Brackens 3-22 Mullianhone 0-27, but a review of the match footage showed that a score had been incorrectly recorded by the referee.

== Relegation ==
=== Relegation semi-finals ===
13 September 2026 Relegation semi-final	Upperchurch–Drombane	0-23 – 0-17	Roscrea	The Ragg
13:30	Pat Ryan 0-8 (5f), Gavin Ryan 0-5 (5f), Philip O'Dwyer, Keith Ryan and Conor Fahey 0-2 each, Paddy Phelan, Jack Butler, Aaron Ryan and Sean Griffin 0-1 each	Report	Shane Fletcher (3f), Alan Tynan and Luke Cashin 0-4 each, Leigh Loughnane 0-2, Evan Fitzpatrick, Darragh Tynan and Aaron O'Donoghue 0-1 each	Referee: Phil Ryan

13 September 2026 Relegation semi-final	Clonoulty–Rossmore	2-19 – 1-18	Mullinahone	Boherlahan
15:30	Stephen Ferncombe 1-11 (0-8f), Cathal Bourke 0-4, Jimmy Maher 1-0, John O'Keeffe, Jamie Davern, Jack Ryan and Michael Ryan (W) 0-1 each	Report	Jack Shelly 1-4 (0-1f), Micheal Dunne 0-7 (6f, 1 65'), Sam Rowan 0-4, Daire O'Brien, Seán Curran and Eoin O'Dwyer 0-1 each	Referee: Peter Carroll

=== Relegation final ===
27 September 2026 Relegation final	Mullinahone	0-19 – 2-18	Roscrea	Templetuohy
15:15				Referee: Joseph Leahy

== Knockout stage ==
=== Bracket ===
Preliminary Quarter-Finals; 5 & 6 September 2026
Clonoulty–Rossmore	1-12
Nenagh Éire Óg	2-11
Loughmore–Castleiney	4-18
Holycross–Ballycahill	4-25

Quarter-Finals; 12 & 13 September 2026
Cashel King Cormacs	0-21
Nenagh Éire Óg	3-29
Thurles Sarsfields	3-22
Borris–Ileigh	1-18
JK Brackens	2-23
Holycross–Ballycahill	0-28
Moycarkey–Borris	3-23
Kiladangan	2-22

Semi-Finals; 26 & 27 September 2026
Nenagh Éire Óg	1-14
Thurles Sarsfields	2-18
JK Brackens	0-23
Moycarkey–Borris	2-19

Final; 11 October 2026
Thurles Sarsfields	1-19
Moycarkey–Borris	1-11

=== Preliminary quarter-finals ===
5 September 2026 Preliminary quarter-final	Loughmore–Castleiney	4-18 – 4-25	Holycross–Ballycahill	The Ragg
17:00	John McGrath 2-8 (0-6f), Liam McGrath 2-1, Eoin O'Connell and Brian McGrath 0-2 each, Ciaran Connolly, Ed Meagher, Joey Quinn, Tommy Maher and Noel McGrath 0-1 each	Report	Darragh Woods 1-8 (0-4f), Robbie Ryan and Joe Caesar 1-4 each, Eoin Craddock 0-4, Cathal Barrett 1-0, Bryan O'Mara 0-2, Evan Morris, Jamie Lee Dwan and Tiarnan Ryan 0-1 each	Referee: Michael Kennedy

6 September 2026 Preliminary quarter-final	Clonoulty–Rossmore	1-12 – 2-11	Nenagh Éire Óg	Borrisoleigh
15:30	Stephen Ferncombe 1-7 (0-6f), Michael Ryan 0-2, Ronan Heffernan, Donncha Quirke and Jack Ryan 0-1 each	Report	Ben West 2-0, Mikey Heffernan 0-6 (4f), Sam O'Farrell 0-2 (1f), Paddy Murphy, Emmett Jones and Jake Donelan Houlihan (1f) 0-1 each	Referee: Conor Doyle

=== Quarter-finals ===
12 September 2026 Quarter-final	Moycarkey–Borris	3-23 – 2-22	Kiladangan	Semple Stadium
14:00	David Costigan 2-3, Kieran Morris 1-6 (0-4f), Joe Maher 0-4, Niall Heffernan 0-3, Max Hackett 0-2, Rhys Shelly (1f), Joe Egan, Killian Cantwell, Rory Darmody and Pat Molloy 0-1 each	Report	Billy Seymour 0-9 (5f), Dara O'Dwyer 1-1, Alan Flynn 1-0, Paul Flynn and Tadhg Gallagher 0-3 each, Johnny Horan and Conor Byrne 0-2 each, Seán Hayes and Matthew Cleary 0-1 each	Referee: John Dooley

12 September 2026 Quarter-final	Thurles Sarsfields	3-22 – 1-18	Borris–Ileigh	Semple Stadium
15:45	Kieran Rossiter 2-5, Darragh Stakelum 1-3 (0-2f), Aidan McCormack 0-4 (3f), Paddy Creedon, Euan Murray and Cian Stakelum 0-2 each, Paul Maher, Daniel Rossiter, Tommy Maher and Conor Stakelum 0-1 each	Report	Eddie Ryan 1-10 (1-10f), James Devaney 0-2, Conor Kenny, Jerry Kelly, Paddy McCormack, Kevin Maher, Jack Hogan and Tom Delaney 0-1 each	Referee: Ciaran O'Donovan

13 September 2026 Quarter-final	Cashel King Cormacs	0-21 – 3-29	Nenagh Éire Óg	Semple Stadium
14:00	Devon Ryan 0-6 (4f), Eoghan Connolly 0-4 (4f), Davy McGrath 0-3, Conor O'Dwyer and Denis O'Callaghan 0-2 each, Ger Browne, Daniel Moloney, Ross Bonnar and Oisín O'Donoghue 0-1 each	Report	Mikey Heffernan 0-12 (8f), Sam O'Farrell 2-3, Tommy Heffernan 1-3, Josh Keller 0-3, Ben West and Philip Hickey 0-2 each, Paddy Murphy, Filip McIntrye, Billy O'Brien and Adam Grattan 0-1 each	Referee: Kevin Jordan

13 September 2026 Quarter-final	JK Brackens	2-23 – 0-28	Holycross–Ballycahill	Semple Stadium
15:45	Lyndon Fairbrother 1-8 (0-7f), Jamie Ormond 1-4, Andrew Ormond and Dean McEnroe 0-3 each, Ned Walsh 0-2, Conor Cadell, James Corcoran and Shane Doyle 0-1 each	Report	Darragh Woods 0-12 (10f), Tiarnan Ryan and Eoin Craddock 0-3 each, Robbie Ryan, Bryan O'Mara, Tadhg Gould and Joe Caesar 0-2 each, Mikey Nally and Jimmy Lahart 0-1 each	Referee: Alan Tierney

=== Semi-finals ===
26 September 2026 Semi-final	Nenagh Éire Óg	1-14 – 2-18	Thurles Sarsfields	Semple Stadium
15:45	Mikey Heffernan 0-12 (10f, 1 65'), Sam O'Farrell 1-1, Filip McIntyre 0-1	Report	Aidan McCormack 0-10 (7f, 1 65'), Darragh Stakelum 1-1, Paddy Creedon 1-0, Kieran Rossiter 0-3, Eoin Purcell, Euan Murray, Robbie Stapleton and Ronan Maher 0-1 each	Referee: Conor Doyle

27 September 2026 Semi-final	JK Brackens	0-23 – 2-19	Moycarkey–Borris	Semple Stadium
15:45	Lyndon Fairbrother 0-11 (11f), Andrew Ormond 0-4, Ned Walsh and Jamie Ormond 0-2 each, Shane Doyle (1f), Ned Delaney, James Corcoran and Eanna McBride 0-1 each	Report	Kieran Morris 1-3, David Costigan 0-4, Joe Egan 1-0, Killian Cantwell 0-3 (3f), Max Hackett and Joe Maher 0-2 each, Niall Heffernan, Rory Darmody, Jack Hayes, Pat Molloy and Kieran Cummins 0-1 each	Referee: Michael Kennedy

=== Final ===
11 October 2026 Final	Thurles Sarsfields	1-19 – 1-11	Moycarkey–Borris	Semple Stadium
16:00	Eoin Purcell 1-4, Aidan McCormack 0-4 (4f), Kieran Rossiter 0-3, Aidan Stakelum and Euan Murray 0-2 each, Paul Maher, Daniel Rossiter, Paddy Creedon and Ronan Maher (1f) 0-1 each	Report	Joe Maher 1-1, Max Hackett and Jack Hayes 0-3 each, Kieran Morris 0-2 (2f), Killian Cantwell (1f) and Niall Heffernan 0-1 each	Referee: Ciaran O'Donovan
Note: Live on TG4

== Championship statistics ==
=== Top scorers ===
==== Overall ====
Rank	Player	Club	Tally	Total	Matches	Average
1	Eddie Ryan	Borris–Ileigh	2-49	55	4	13.25
2	Darragh Woods	Holycross–Ballycahill	2-47	53	5	10.6
3	John McGrath	Loughmore–Castleiney	3-35	44	4	11
4	Aidan McCormack	Thurles Sarsfields	1-40	43	6	7.17
5	Mikey Heffernan	Nenagh Éire Óg	0-42	42	6	7
6	Billy Seymour	Kiladangan	1-34	37	4	9.25
7	Stephen Ferncombe	Clonoulty–Rossmore	2-30	36	4	9
8	Jamie Ormond	JK Brackens	3-25	34	5	6.8
8	Micheal Dunne	Mullinahone	0-34	34	3	11.33
10	Kieran Morris	Moycarkey–Borris	3-24	33	6	6.5

==== In a single game ====
Rank	Player	Club	Tally	Total	Opposition
1	Eddie Ryan	Borris–Ileigh	1-16	19	Loughmore–Castleiney
2	John McGrath	Loughmore–Castleiney	2-8	14	Holycross–Ballycahill
2	Willie Cleary	Kilruane MacDonaghs	1-11	14	Thurles Sarsfields
4	Séamus Callanan	Drom & Inch	1-10	13	Kiladangan
4	Eddie Ryan	Borris–Ileigh	1-10	13	Thurles Sarsfields
4	Eddie Ryan	Borris–Ileigh	0-13	13	Moycarkey–Borris
7	Jamie Ormond	JK Brackens	2-6	12	Mullinahone
7	Billy Seymour	Kiladangan	1-9	12	Cashel King Cormacs
7	Micheal Dunne	Mullinahone	0-12	12	Toomevara
7	Darragh Woods	Holycross–Ballycahill	0-12	12	JK Brackens
7	Mikey Heffernan	Nenagh Éire Óg	0-12	12	Cashel King Cormacs
7	Mikey Heffernan	Nenagh Éire Óg	0-12	12	Thurles Sarsfields
