= 2025 Tipperary Premier Intermediate Hurling Championship =

- Dates: 8 August – 26 October 2025
- Teams: 16
- Sponsor: FBD Insurance
- Champions: Upperchurch–Drombane (1st title); Keith Ryan (captain); Liam Dunphy (manager)
- Runners-up: Carrick Swans; Eric O'Halloran (captain); Kieran Reade (manager)
- Relegated: Clonakenny

Tournament statistics
- Matches played: 36
- Goals scored: 107 (2.97 per match)
- Points scored: 1286 (35.72 per match)
- Top scorer(s): Tossy Ryan (3-54)

The 2025 Tipperary Premier Intermediate Hurling Championship was the ninth staging of the Tipperary Premier Intermediate Hurling Championship since its establishment by the Tipperary County Board in 2017 and subsequent rebranding in 2022. The draws for the group stage pairings took place on 27 March 2025. The competition ran from 8 August to 26 October 2024.

The final was played on 26 October 2025 at FBD Semple Stadium in Thurles, between Upperchurch–Drombane and Carrick Swans, in what was their first ever meeting in the final. Upperchurch–Drombane won the match by 2–17 to 1–14 to claim their first ever championship title.

Boherlahan–Dualla's Tossy Ryan was the championship's top scorer with 3-54.

== Team changes ==
=== To Championship ===
Relegated from the Tipperary Senior Hurling Championship

- Templederry Kenyons

Promoted from the Tipperary Intermediate Hurling Championship

- Moneygall

=== From Championship ===
Promoted to the Tipperary Senior Hurling Championship

- Cashel King Cormacs

Relegated to the Tipperary Intermediate Hurling Championship

- Newport

== Group 1 ==
=== Group 1 table ===
Knockout stage Relegation stage

| Team | Matches | | | | Score | | | Pts |
| Team | Pld | W | D | L | For | Against | Diff | Pts |
|---|---|---|---|---|---|---|---|---|
| Gortnahoe–Glengoole | 3 | 3 | 0 | 0 | 84 | 66 | 18 | 6 |
| Thurles Sarsfields | 3 | 1 | 0 | 2 | 67 | 72 | -5 | 2 |
| Moyne–Templetuohy | 3 | 1 | 0 | 2 | 57 | 63 | -6 | 2 |
| Seán Treacys | 3 | 1 | 0 | 2 | 67 | 74 | -7 | 2 |

=== Group 1 results ===
| 8 August 2025 Round 1 | Moyne–Templetuohy | 1-18 - 2-17 | Gortnahoe–Glengoole | Boherlahen Grounds |
| | C Deegan (0-7f); G O’Connor (0-5f), P Maher (1-0 pen); T Meade (0-2), B Ryan (0-1), B Moore (0-1), D Leahy (0-1). | Report | K Hayes (1-14, 1-0 pen, 0-10f), R Teehan (1-0), D Corbett (0-1), D Maher (0-1), C Gleeson (0-1). |

| 10 August 2025 Round 1 | Thurles Sarsfields | 3-19 - 1-18 | Seán Treacys | Drombane Grounds |
| | J Lanigan (1-6, 1-0 pen, 0-6f), C Minogue (1-1), T Maher (0-4, 2f), M McCormack (1-0); C Lanigan (0-3), D Rossiter (0-1), M Purcell (0-1); R Purcell (0-1), M O’Brien (0-1), M Russell (0-1). | Report | P Dawson (0-7f), J Butler (1-3), P Deegan (0-4); C Kennedy (0-2), S Ryan (0-1), M Feehan (0-1), D Carr (0-1). |

| 23 August 2024 Round 2 | Moyne–Templetuohy | 2-11 - 1-19 | Seán Treacys | Clonoulty Grounds |
| | G O’Connor 1-5f, B Ryan 1-0, C Deegan 0-2f, C Bowe 0-2, F Jones, T Meade 0-1 each. | Report | P Dawson (0-10, 0-7f, 0-1sl-cut), P Deegan 1-0, C Kennedy 0-3, C Kennedy 0-2, S Stapleton 0-1f, S Ryan, E Sheldon, M Feehan 0-1 each. |

| 24 August 2024 Round 2 | Gortnahoe–Glengoole | 3-23 - 1-18 | Thurles Sarsfields | Templetuohy Grounds |
| | K Hayes (0-9, 0-3f), D Maher 2-2, B Maher 1-0, R Teehan, F Cleary, J Moore all 0-3 each, A Maher 0-2, D Corbett 0-1. | Report | J Lanigan (0-11, 0-9f), A Stakelum 1-0, R Purcell, C Minogue 0-2 each, A Ryan, D Rossiter, M O’Brien 0-1 each. |

| 7 September 2025 Round 3 | Moyne–Templetuohy | 1-16 - 1-15 | Thurles Sarsfields | Páirc Shíleáin |
| | G O’Connor (1-7, 1-4f), C Deegan (0-6, 5f), S Hayes (0-1), T Meade (0-1); C Bowe (0-1). | Report | J Lanigan (1-8, 1-0 pen, 0-6f), R Purcell (0-3), C Minogue (0-2), D Rossiter (0-1); A Ryan (0-1). |

| 7 September 2025 Round 3 | Gortnahoe–Glengoole | 2-23 - 1-21 | Seán Treacys | Drombane Grounds |
| | K Hayes (0-10, 4f, 1 ’65), D Maher (1-4), A Guilfoyle (1-0), D Corbett (0-3), C Gleeson (0-2), L Hayes (0-1), R Teehan (0-1), J Moore (0-1), A Maher (0-1). | Report | P Dawson (0-9, 8f), L Collins (0-5), M Feehan (1-0), C Kennedy (0-3), J Butler (0-2, 7), C Kennedy (0-1), E Sheldon (0-1). |

== Group 2 ==
=== Group 2 table ===
Knockout stage Relegation stage

| Team | Matches | | | | Score | | | Pts |
| Team | Pld | W | D | L | For | Against | Diff | Pts |
|---|---|---|---|---|---|---|---|---|
| Boherlahan–Dualla | 3 | 2 | 0 | 1 | 74 | 77 | -3 | 4 |
| Silvermines | 3 | 2 | 0 | 1 | 72 | 63 | 9 | 4 |
| Éire Óg Annacarty–Donohill | 3 | 1 | 0 | 2 | 74 | 75 | -1 | 2 |
| Templederry Kenyons | 3 | 1 | 0 | 2 | 71 | 76 | -5 | 0 |

=== Group 2 results ===
| 9 August 2025 Round 1 | Silvermines | 2-17 - 1-22 | Boherlahan–Dualla | Bishop Quinlan Park |
| | J Forde (1-11, 0-7f, 8), S Nolan (1-0, 7), P Leamy (0-2, 6), A Hayden (0-2, 8), B Seymour (0-1, 7), C Treacy (0-1, 7). | Report | T Ryan (0-12, 7f), P Gahan (1-1), S Leahy (0-2), C Ryan (0-2), M Downey (0-1), D Fogarty (0-1), E Ryan (0-1), B Og Dwyer (0-1), J Kirby (0-1). |

| 10 August 2025 Round 1 | Templederry Kenyons | 3-16 - 2-22 | Éire Óg Annacarty–Donohill | Kilcommon Grounds |
| | E Murray (0-9, 7f), S Ryan (1-3); G Ryan (1-2), M Ryan (1-0), C Murray (0-2, 1f), | Report | D Kelly (1-7, 0-4f), A Griffin (1-6, 0-2f), D Crosse (0-4), P Bradshaw (0-2); D O’Dwyer (0-2), S Ryan (0-1). |

| 23 August 2025 Round 2 | Boherlahan–Dualla | 1-22 - 2-17 | Éire Óg Annacarty–Donohill | Clonoulty Grounds |
| | T Ryan (1-16, 1-0 pen, 0-12f, 0-1 ’65), D Fogarty (0-1), E Ryan (0-1), B Óg O’Dwyer (0-1), C Ryan (0-1), M Downey (0-1), R Bargary (0-1). | Report | D Kelly (1-4, 0-2f, 0-1 ’65), C O’Brien (1-2), D Crosse (0-3), P Bradshaw (0-2), D O’Dwyer (0-2), S Ryan (0-2, 1f), A Griffin (0-2, 1f). |

| 23 August 2025 Round 2 | Silvermines | 1-21 - 1-12 | Templederry Kenyons | MacDonagh Park |
| | J Forde (1-14, 0-9f, 0-1 65, 0-1 sl-cut), P Leamy 0-3, D Quinn 0-2, L O’Brien, C Treacy all 0-1 each. | Report | S Ryan (1-4, 0-1f), E Murray (0-4, 0-3f), C Murray (0-3, 0-2f), L McCutcheon 0-1. |

| 6 September 2025 Round 3 | Boherlahan–Dualla | 2-18 - 3-22 | Templederry Kenyons | Cappawhite Grounds |
| | T Ryan (1-6, 0-5f), S Leahy (1-2), M Downey (0-2), C Ryan (0-2); J Kirby (0-2), J Murphy (0-1), P Gahan (0-1); R Bargary (0-1), G O’Dwyer (0-1f). | Report | S Ryan (2-6, 0-1f), E Murray (0-7, 3f), S Collins (1-1); C Murray (0-4, 1f), A Ryan (0-2), D Carey (0-1), G Ryan (0-1). |

| 6 September 2025 Round 3 | Éire Óg Annacarty–Donohill | 2-17 - 2-19 | Silvermines | Bishop Quinlan Park |
| | D Kelly (1-3, 0-3f), A Griffin (0-5, 0-4f), D Crosse 1-2, D O’Dwyer 0-3, D Mooney 0-1f, S Ryan, P Bradshaw, C Bradshaw all 0-1 each. | Report | S Nolan 1-5, J Forde (0-7, 0-4, 0-2 65s), A Hayden 1-2, P Leamy 0-3, S McGrath, C McKelvey 0-1 each. |

== Group 3 ==
=== Group 3 table ===
Knockout stage Relegation stage

| Team | Matches | | | | Score | | | Pts |
| Team | Pld | W | D | L | For | Against | Diff | Pts |
|---|---|---|---|---|---|---|---|---|
| Upperchurch–Drombane | 3 | 2 | 1 | 0 | 64 | 52 | 12 | 5 |
| Moneygall | 3 | 1 | 2 | 0 | 73 | 69 | 4 | 4 |
| Ballina | 3 | 1 | 1 | 1 | 68 | 65 | 3 | 3 |
| Burgess | 3 | 0 | 0 | 3 | 63 | 82 | -19 | 0 |

=== Group 3 results ===
| 8 August 2025 Round 1 | Ballina | 3-16 - 0-21 | Burgess | Fr Kenyon Park |
| | M Power (0-7, 4f, 1 ’65), C King (1-3), J Egan (1-1), P Bradley (1-1), M Breen (0-2), B Collins (0-1), C O’Donnell (0-1). | Report | S Murray (0-10, 7f, 1 ’65), D Nealon (0-3), K Grace (0-3), S Kirwan (0-2), B O’Flaherty (0-1), E Hogan (0-1). |

| 10 August 2025 Round 1 | Moneygall | 1-15 - 0-18 | Upperchurch–Drombane | Dolla Grounds |
| | E Doughan (1-4, 0-4f), A Hogan (0-4f), T Whyte (0-2), S Kenneally (0-2); A Ryan (0-1); J Fogarty (0-1), S Gleeson (0-1). | Report | G Ryan (0-6 (4f, 1 65’), L Shanahan (0-5f); C Fahey (0-4), D Grant (0-1); P Shanahan (0-1), P Phelan (0-1). |

| 23 August 2025 Round 2 | Burgess | 0-16 - 1-24 | Upperchurch–Drombane | St Michael's Park |
| | S Murray (0-12, 0-8f), E Grace 0-2, D Nealon, B O’Flaherty 0-1 each. | Report | L Shanahan (0-14, 0-12f), G Ryan 0-3f, P Shortt 1-0, P Shanahan 0-2, P Ryan, A Ryan, N Grant, P Phelan, P Greene all 0-1 each. |

| 23 August 2025 Round 2 | Ballina | 2-19 - 3-16 | Moneygall | MacDonagh Park |
| | M Power (0-7, 5f, 1’65), C King (1-3), E Power (1-1), J Egan (0-2), J Collins (0-1), Z Egan (0-1); M Breen (0-1), D Kelly (0-1), C O’Donnell (0-1), S O’Brien (0-1). | Report | E Doughan (2-7, 0-3f), A Hogan (1-3); J Fogarty (0-2), S Kenneally (0-2), P Fogarty (0-1), T Whyte (0-1). |

| 6 September 2025 Round 3 | Ballina | 1-15 - 1-16 | Upperchurch–Drombane | Kilcommon Grounds |
| | M Power (1-4, 0-4f), E Power (0-3), J Collins (0-2), Z Egan (0-2), J Egan (0-1), C King (0-1). | Report | G Ryan (1-3, 1-2f), L Shanahan (0-4, 3f), P Phelan (0-4), P Greene (0-3, 2f), P Ryan (0-1), C Fahey (0-1). |

| 6 September 2025 Round 3 | Burgess | 3-17 - 2-24 | Moneygall | St Michael's Park |
| | S Murray (0-9f); K Grace (1-3), D Nealon (0-4, 3f), B O’Flaherty (1-0), S Kirwan (1-0), T Dunne (0-1), S Dunne (0-1). | Report | E Doughan (1-7, 0-6f), A Hogan (0-6, 3f, 1’65); B Kenny (1-1); T Whyte (0-4), S Kenneally (0-3), R Teehan (0-1); J Fogarty (0-1), P Fogarty (0-1). |

== Group 4 ==
=== Group 4 table ===
Knockout stage Relegation stage

| Team | Matches | | | | Score | | | Pts |
| Team | Pld | W | D | L | For | Against | Diff | Pts |
|---|---|---|---|---|---|---|---|---|
| Carrick Swans | 3 | 3 | 0 | 0 | 64 | 55 | 9 | 6 |
| Killenaule | 3 | 2 | 0 | 1 | 83 | 60 | 23 | 4 |
| St Mary's | 3 | 1 | 0 | 2 | 64 | 59 | 5 | 2 |
| Clonakenny | 3 | 0 | 0 | 3 | 54 | 91 | -37 | 0 |

=== Group 4 results ===
| 10 August 2025 Round 1 | Carrick Swans | 1-18 - 0-16 | Clonakenny | Boherlahan Grounds |
| | C Lanigan (0-9, 8f), A Dunne (1-3), S Tobin (0-4), C Walsh (0-2). | Report | C O’Dwyer (0-12, 7f); B Bergin (0-2), D Byrne (0-1), S Stapleton (0-1). |

| 10 August 2025 Round 1 | Killenaule | 1-24 - 0-11 | St Mary's | Monroe Grounds |
| | M Stakelum (1-3), L Ryan (0-4, 1f, 1 65), M Doyle (0-3), J O’Dwyer (0-3f); G Browne (0-2), D O’Connor (0-2); D Fitzgerald (0-2), J O’Dwyer (0-1), P Feehan (0-1), T Stakelum (0-1), F Fitzgerald (0-1), O Shelly (0-1). | Report | R Leahy (0-4, 3f), P McGarry (0-2, 1f), S Kennedy (0-2), R Peters (0-2); D O’Connor (0-1). |

| 23 August 2025 Round 2 | Clonakenny | 0-14 - 3-27 | St Mary's | Leahy Park |
| | C O’Dwyer (0-5, 3f); B Bergin (0-3), JJ Ryan (0-2), MJ Carroll (0-2); D Byrne (0-1), N Ryan (0-1). | Report | R Leahy (2-6, 0-2f), P McGarry (1-6), R Peters (0-6), A Cagney (0-5), E Dunphy (0-1f); T Condon (0-1), J Power (0-1), C Deely (0-1). |

| 24 August 2025 Round 2 | Carrick Swans | 3-16 - 0-22 | Killenaule | Clonmel Sportsfield |
| | C Lanigan (0-8, 7f), S Tobin (2-1), A O’Halloran (1-0 penalty), B Mulcaire (0-1), G O’Halloran (0-1), D Waters (0-1); E O’Halloran (0-1), J Holloway (0-1); C Walsh (0-1), A Dunne (0-1). | Report | L Ryan (0-6f), C O’Dwyer (0-5, 2f, 1 ’65), M Stakelum (0-2), D O’Connor (0-2); P Feehan (0-2), F Fitzgerald (0-1); J O’Dwyer (0-1), J O’Dwyer (0-1f); M Doyle (0-1), G Browne (0-1). |

| 6 September 2025 Round 3 | Carrick Swans | 1-15 - 1-14 | St Mary's | Fethard GAA Park |
| | C Lanigan (0-12, 9f, 2 65), A Waters (1-0), A Dunne (0-2), A O'Halloran (0-1). | RepAaron O’Halloran (0-1, 8), ort | R Leahy (0-8f), P McGarry (1-1), Kennedy (0-1), E Dunphy (0-1f); S Ryan (0-1), J Power (0-1), A Cagney (0-1). |

| 6 September 2025 Round 3 | Clonakenny | 1-21 - 3-25 | Killenaule | Templetuohy Grounds |
| | C O’Dwyer (1-9, 1-0 pen, 0-6f), MJ Carroll (0-5), B Bergin (0-4), J Costigan (0-1), JJ Ryan (0-1), D Byrne (0-1). | Report | M Stakelum (1-2), J O’Dwyer (1-2, 0-1f), L Ryan (0-5, 4f), J O’Dwyer (1-1, 1-0 pen, 0-1f), D O’Connor (0-4), C O’Dwyer (0-4, 2f), D Fitzgerald (0-3), G Browne (0-2), M Doyle (0-1). |

== Relegation stage ==
=== Relegation semi-finals ===
| 21 September 2025 Semi-final | Templederry Kenyons | 4-25 - 5-15 | Burgess | MacDonagh Park |
| | S Ryan (3-6, 0-3f), A Ryan (1-5), E Murray (0-8, 0-5f, 0-2 65), C Murray (0-2); S Collins (0-1), B Stapleton (0-1), D Carey (0-1); M Collins (0-1). | Report | D Nealon (1-11, 0-7f, 0-1 65), S Dunne (2-0), K Grace (2-0), T Dunne (0-1); K Nealon (0-1), S Kirwan (0-1), S Murray (0-1). |

| 21 September 2025 Semi-final | Clonakenny | 1-15 - 1-17 | Moyne–Templetuohy | Páirc Shíleáin |
| | C O’Dwyer (0-9, 0-8f); B Bergin (1-1), JJ Ryan (0-2), MJ Carroll (0-2); N Ryan (0-1). | Report | G O’Connor (1-12, 0-7f), T Meade (0-2), E Guilfoyle (0-1), B Moore (0-1); B Ryan (0-1). |

=== Relegation final ===
| 11 October 2025 Final | Burgess | 2-25 - 3-14 | Clonakenny | MacDonagh Park |
| | D Nealon 0-8 (6 frees); K Grace 1-2; S Kirwan 0-4; J O’Dwyer 1-1; E Grace 0-3; D Maher, M Ryan, S Murray (1 free) 0-2 each; K Nealon 0-1. | Report | C O’Dwyer 3-4 (0-4 frees); JJ Ryan 0-4; N Ryan 0-3; D Ryan 0-2; B Bergin 0-1. |

== Knockout stage ==
=== Preliminary quarter-finals ===
| 20 September 2025 Pre. q/f | Ballina | 2-22 - 3-16 | Thurles Sarsfields | Fr Kenyon Park |
| | M Power (0-12f), J Collins 1-3, T Shanahan 1-1, C King 0-4, E Power, S O’Brien 0-1 each. | Report | J Lanigan (1-12, 1-0 pen, 0-8f), A Stakelum, M O’Brien 1-1 each, R Purcell 0-2. |

| 20 September 2025 Pre. q/f | Éire Óg Annacarty–Donohill | 0-20 - 1-19 | Moneygall | Páirc Shíleáin |
| | A Griffin (0-12, 0-9f), D O’Dwyer (0-3), C O’Brien (0-2), C Bradshaw (0-1), K Fox (0-1), P Bradshaw (0-1). | Report | E Doughan (0-10, 0-7f), S Kenneally (1-1), A Hogan (0-4, 0-1f), J Fogarty (0-2), T Whyte (0-1), S Gleeson (0-1). |

=== Quarter-finals ===
| 27 September 2025 Quarter-final | Carick Swans | 0-21 - 1-14 | Silvermines | Boherlahan Grounds |
| | C Lanigan (0-9, 6f), A Dunne (0-4) C Walsh (0-3), S Tobin (0-2), B Mulcaire (0-1), G O’Halloran (0-1), E O’Halloran (0-1). | Report | J Forde (0-7, 6f), S Nolan (1-2, 1f); A Hayden (0-2), C McKelvey (0-1), B Seymour (0-1), D Treacy (0-1). |

| 27 September 2025 Quarter-final | Gortnahoe–Glengoole | 2-24 - 2-19 | Ballina | Fr Kenyon Park |
| | R Teehan 2-6, K Hayes (0-8, 0-5f), A Maher 0-3, D Corbett, D Nolan, B Maher, A Guilfoyle, C Gleeson, J Moore all 0-1 each. | Report | M Power (0-6, 0-5f), E Power 1-3, C King 1-2, D Kelly (0-2, 0-1f), B Collins 0-2, T Shanahan, J Egan, S O’Brien all 0-1 each, S Grace 0-1f. |

| 28 September 2025 Quarter-final | Boherlahan–Dualla | 2-16 - 1-14 | Moneygall | BIshop Quinlan Park |
| | T Ryan 1-9f, P Gahan 1-0, J Kirby 0-2, B Óg O’Dwyer, E Ryan, C Ryan, M Downey all 0-1 each, G O’Dwyer 0-1f. | Report | E Doughan (0-8, 0-6f), A Hogan (0-3, 0-2f, 0-1 65), S Kenneally 1-0, S Gleeson, J Fogarty, B Kenny all 0-1 each. |

| 28 September 2025 Quarter-final | Upperchurch–Drombane | 0-20 - 1-12 | Killenaule | St Michael's Park |
| | L Shanahan 0-7f, P Ryan, P Phelan 0-3 each, P Greene (0-2, 0-1f), T Corbett, K Ryan, C Fahey, C Ryan, G Grant all 0-1 each. | Report | M Stakelum 1-1, L Ryan (0-4, 0-3f), C O’Dwyer 0-2f, K O’Dwyer, D Fitzgerald, T Stakelum, P O’Dwyer, J O’Dwyer all 0-1 each. |

=== Semi-finals ===
| 11 October 2025 Semi-final | Carrick Swans | 2-18 - 0-21 | Boherlahan–Dualla | FBD Semple Stadium |
| | C Lanigan (0-9, 0-5f), A Dunne 2-2, S Tobin 0-3, T Flemming 0-2, A O’Halloran, C Walsh 0-1 each. | Report | T Ryan (0-11, 0-8f), B Óg O’Dwyer 0-3, C Ryan, G O’Dwyer, J Kirby 0-2 each, E Moloughney 0-1. |

| 12 October 2025 Semi-final | Upperchurch–Drombane | 0-20 - 0-19 | Gortnahoe–Glengoole | FBD Semple Stadium |
| | L Shanahan (0-8, 0-7f), P Phelan 0-6, P Greene 0-3, G Ryan 0-2f, C Fahey 0-1. | Report | K Hayes (0-11, 0-7f), R Teehan 0-3, D Corbett 0-2, J Moore, F Cleary, D Maher all 0-1 each. |

=== Final ===
| 26 October 2025 Final | Carrick Swans | 1-14 - 2-17 | Upperchurch–Drombane | FBD Semple Stadium |
| | C Lanigan 1-7 (0-4 frees); S Tobin 0-3; A Dunne, A O’Halloran, L O’Dwyer, T Fleming 0-1 each. | Report | L Shanahan 0-7 (6 frees); G Ryan 0-3 frees; P Phelan, P Shanahan 1-0 each; P Greene, P Ryan, C Fahey 0-2 each; T Corbett 0-1. |

== Championship statistics ==
=== Top scorers ===
Overall

| Rank | Player | Club | Tally | Total | Matches | Average |
|---|---|---|---|---|---|---|
| 1 | Tossy Ryan | Boherlahan–Dualla | 3-54 | 63 | 5 | 10.60 |
| 2 | Calum Lanigan | Carrick Swans | 1-54 | 57 | 6 | 9.50 |
| 3 | Keane Hayes | Gortnahoe–Glengoole | 1-52 | 55 | 5 | 11.00 |
| 4 | Cian O'Dwyer | Clonakenny | 4-39 | 51 | 5 | 10.20 |
| 5 | Eoghan Doughan | Moneygall | 4-36 | 48 | 5 | 9.60 |
| 6 | Jack Lanigan | Thurles Sarsfields | 3-37 | 46 | 4 | 11.50 |
| 7 | Jason Forde | Silvermines | 2-39 | 45 | 4 | 11.25 |
| 7 | Luke Shanahan | Upperchurch–Drombane | 0-45 | 45 | 6 | 7.50 |
| 9 | Seán Ryan | Templederry Kenyons | 7-19 | 40 | 4 | 10.00 |
| 10 | Matthew Power | Ballina | 1-36 | 39 | 5 | 7.80 |

Single game

| Rank | Player | Club | Tally | Total | Opposition |
|---|---|---|---|---|---|
| 1 | Tossy Ryan | Boherlahan–Dualla | 1-16 | 19 | Éire Óg Annacarty–Donohill |
| 2 | Keane Hayes | Gortnahoe–Glengoole | 1-14 | 17 | Moyne–Templetuohy |
| 2 | Jason Forde | Silvermines | 1-14 | 17 | Templederry Kenyons |
| 4 | Seán Ryan | Templederry Kenyons | 3-06 | 15 | Burgess |
| 4 | Jack Lanigan | Thurles Sarsfields | 1-12 | 15 | Ballina |
| 4 | Gearóid O'Connor | Moyne–Templetuohy | 1-12 | 15 | Clonakenny |
| 7 | Jason Forde | Silvermines | 1-11 | 14 | Boherlahan–Dualla |
| 7 | David Nealon | Burgess | 1-11 | 14 | Templederry Kenyons |
| 7 | Luke Shanahan | Upperchurch–Drombane | 0-14 | 14 | Burgess |
| 10 | Cian O'Dwyer | Clonakenny | 3-04 | 13 | Burgess |
| 10 | Eoghan Doughan | Moneygall | 2-07 | 13 | Boherlahan–Dualla |
