= 2024 Tipperary Premier Intermediate Hurling Championship =

- Dates: 26 July – 13 October 2024
- Teams: 16
- Sponsor: FBD Insurance
- Champions: Cashel King Cormacs (1st title); James Cummins (captain); T. J. Connolly (manager)
- Runners-up: Carrick Swans; Eric O'Halloran (captain); Kieran Reade (manager)
- Relegated: Newport

Tournament statistics
- Matches played: 36
- Goals scored: 93 (2.58 per match)
- Points scored: 1325 (36.81 per match)
- Top scorer(s): Devon Ryan (3-44)

The 2024 Tipperary Premier Intermediate Hurling Championship was the eighth staging of the Tipperary Premier Intermediate Hurling Championship since its establishment by the Tipperary County Board in 2017 and subsequent rebranding in 2022. The draws for the group stage pairings took place on 18 April 2024. The competition ran from 26 July to 13 October 2024.

The final was played on 13 October 2024 at FBD Semple Stadium in Thurles, between Cashel King Cormacs and Carrick Swans, in what was their first ever meeting in the final. Cashel King Cormacs won the match by 2-17 to 0-19 to claim their first ever championship title.

Devon Ryan was the championship's top scorer with 3-44.

== Team changes ==
=== To Championship ===
Relegated from the Tipperary Senior Hurling Championship

- Upperchurch–Drombane

Promoted from the Tipperary Intermediate Hurling Championship

- Boherlahan–Dualla

=== From Championship ===
Promoted to the Tipperary Senior Hurling Championship

- Lorrha

Relegated to the Tipperary Intermediate Hurling Championship

- Portroe

== Group 1 ==
=== Group 1 table ===
Advance to knockout stage Advance to relegation stage

Team	Matches				Score			Pts
Team	Pld	W	D	L	For	Against	Diff	Pts
Carrick Swans	3	2	0	1	70	65	5	4
Upperchurch–Drombane	3	2	0	1	75	53	22	4
Ballina	3	1	0	2	59	78	-19	2
Silvermines	3	1	0	2	63	71	-8	2

=== Group 1 results ===
26 July 2024 Round 1	Upperchurch–Drombane	1-15 - 1-17	Carrick Swans	Littleton Grounds
	P Ryan (0-7, 3f); P Phelan (1-1); A Ryan (0-3); G Ryan (0-2, 1f, 1 ’65), N Grant (0-1); P Ryan (0-1).	Report	C Lanigan (1-8, 0-5f); G O’Halloran (0-2 s-cuts); J Murphy (0-1); T Fleming (0-1); A Waters (0-1); B Mulcaire (1 s-cut); A Dunne (0-1); E O’Halloran (0-1); D Waters (0-1).

27 July 2024 Round 1	Silvermines	1-17 - 2-16	Ballina	MacDonagh Park
	J Forde (0-13, 7f, 1 65), C McKelvey (1-2), D Treacy (0-1).	Report	E Power (0-5), M Breen (0-6, 5f), D Kelly (1-1), S O’Brien (1-0), J Collins (0-2f, 7); J Egan (0-1), C O’Donnell (0-1).

10 August 2024 Round 2	Silvermines	1-15 - 1-23	Upperchurch–Drombane	Fr Kenyon Park
	J Forde (0-10, 9f), D Quinn (1-0), S Nolan (0-2), M Daniels (0-1), O Quirke (0-1); D McKelvey (0-1).	Report	G Ryan (0-7, 6f), P Ryan (1-2), A Ryan (0-5), P Ryan (0-3f), P Phelan (0-2), L Shanahan (0-1); K Ryan (0-1); D Grant (0-1), P Greene (0-1).

10 August 2024 Round 2	Ballina	1-19 - 3-18	Carrick Swans	Leahy Park
	J Collins (0-8, 6f), D Kelly (1-3), C Ryan (0-3), M Breen (0-2, 1f), M Power (0-1), Z Egan (0-1), J Egan (0-1).	Report	A Waters (1-3), A Dunne (1-3), C Lanigan (0-5, 4f), A O’Halloran (1-1), D O’Hanlon (0-2), G O’Halloran (0-1), E O’Halloran (0-1), T Fleming (0-1), C Walsh (0-1).

25 August 2024 Round 3	Ballina	0-15 - 4-19	Upperchurch–Drombane	St Michael's Park
	J Collins (0-4, 2f); J Egan (0-3), M Breen (0-3f), C King (0-1), Z Egan (0-1), D Kelly (0-1), B Collins (0-1); M Power (0-1).	Report	P Ryan (2-2, 0-1f), P Greene (1-3), D Grant (1-0), P Shanahan (0-3), L Shanahan (0-2), P Ryan (0-2); N Grant (0-2), G Ryan (0-2), C Ryan (0-1), C Fahey (0-1), P Phelan (0-1).

25 August 2024 Round 3	Carrick Swans	0-23 - 1-22	Silvermines	Gortnahoe Grounds
	A Dunne (0-6, 2f), T Fleming (0-4); A O’Halloran (0-4, 3f), E O’Halloran (0-2), D Waters (0-2), S Foley (0-1), C Loughman (0-1), S Torpey (0-1); O Harrigan (0-1), C Walsh (0-1).	Report	C McKelvey (0-12, 8f), M Corcoran (1-2), J Forde (0-3, 2f, 1 65), A Hayden (0-2), D Treacy (0-1); D McKelvey (0-1), G Leamy (0-1).

== Group 2 ==
=== Group 2 table ===
Advance to knockout stage Advance to relegation stage

Team	Matches				Score			Pts
Team	Pld	W	D	L	For	Against	Diff	Pts
Éire Óg A/D	3	2	1	0	74	69	5	5
Gortnahoe–Glengoole	3	2	0	1	67	66	1	4
Cashel King Cormacs	3	1	1	1	75	67	8	3
Moyne–Templetuohy	3	0	0	3	60	74	-14	0

=== Group 2 results ===
27 July 2024 Round 1	Cashel King Cormacs	0-22 - 2-17	Gortnahoe–Glengoole	The Ragg
	D Ryan (0-10, 0-8f), E Connolly (0-3), R Bonner (0-3), R Connolly (0-1); P Fahey (0-1), J Cummins (0-1), S Delaney (0-1).	Report	K Hayes (1-8, 0-3f), O Cleary (1-1), D Maher (0-3), F Cleary (0-2); R Teehan (0-1), J Moore (0-1), B Maher (0-1).

3 August 2024 Round 1	Éire Óg Annacarty/Donohill	0-25 - 1-18	Moyne–Templetuohy	Leahy Park
	A Griffin (0-5, 0-4f), D O’Dwyer (0-3); D Mooney (0-3f); S Ryan (0-2), T Fox (0-2); D Kelly (0-2), D Crosse (0-2), P Bradshaw (0-2); C O’Brien (0-2); E Bradshaw (0-1), J Kingston (0-1).	Report	G O’Connor (0-11, 0-9f), F Jones (1-1), C Bowe (0-3); D Leahy (0-2), D Fogarty (0-1).

10 August 2024 Round 2	Éire Óg Annacarty/Donohill	2-18 - 2-17	Gortnahoe–Glengoole	Leahy Park
	D Kelly (1-3, 0-1 '65), A Griffin (0-4 frees), S Ryan (1-0), P Bradshaw (0-3), D Crosse (0-2), D Mooney (0-2 frees), T Fox (0-2), C Bradshaw (0-1), D O’Dwyer (0-1).	Report	K Hayes (1-8, 7 frees), D Maher (1-2), R Teehan (0-3), C Gleeson (0-2), L Hayes (0-1), J Moore (0-1).

11 August 2024 Round 2	Cashel King Cormacs	3-19 - 0-19	Moyne–Templetuohy	Littleton Grounds
	D Ryan (1-6, 0-6f), E Connolly (1-1, 1-0 pen); S Delaney (1-0), O O’Donoghue (0-3, 1 s-cut), A Walsh (0-2); R Connolly (0-2); R Bonner (0-2), D McGrath (0-1), J Cummins (0-1), C O’Dwyer (0-1).	Report	G O’Connor (0-10, 7f, 1 s-cut), D Fogarty (0-2); P Meade (0-1), P Maher (0-1f); C Bowe (0-1), D Leahy (0-1); E Guilfoyle (0-1), C Deegan (0-1), F Jones (0-1).

24 August 2024 Round 3	Cashel King Cormacs	3-16 - 0-25	Éire Óg Annacarty/Donohill	Clonoulty Grounds
	D Ryan (1-4, 0-4f), D McGrath (1-1), E Connolly (0-4, 0-2f), G Browne (1-0), R Bonner (0-3), O O’Donoghue (0-2), A Walsh (0-1), D Moloney (0-1).	Report	A Griffin (0-10, 0-8f), T Fox (0-4); D Kelly (0-4), D Crosse (0-3), D Mooney (0-1f); S Ryan (0-1), D O’Dwyer (0-1), P Bradshaw (0-1).

24 August 2024 Round 3	Gortnahoe–Glengoole	0-21 - 0-20	Moyne–Templetuohy	Littleton Grounds
	K Hayes 0-12, R Teehan 0-4, A Maher 0-2, K Slattery 0-1, B Maher 0-1, C Gleeson 0-1.		G O'Connor 0-15, C Bowe 0-2, D Leahy 0-1, E Guilfoyle 0-1, T Meade 0-1.

== Group 3 ==
=== Group 3 table ===
Advance to knockout stage Advance to relegation stage

Team	Matches				Score			Pts
Team	Pld	W	D	L	For	Against	Diff	Pts
Thurles Sarsfields	3	3	0	0	76	56	20	6
Boherlahan–Dualla	3	2	0	1	61	56	5	4
Clonakenny	3	1	0	2	62	67	-5	2
Newport	3	0	0	3	54	74	-20	0

=== Group 3 results ===
27 July 2024 Round 1	Newport	2-14 - 0-27	Thurles Sarsfields	Kilcommon Grounds
	P Ryan (1-8, 0-7f); Colin Floyd (1-0), J Ryan (0-1), S Flanagan (0-1), J Delahunty (0-1), T Floyd (0-1), K Floyd (0-1), Conor Floyd (0-1), P O’Sullivan (0-1).	Report	T Maher (0-6f, 6), R Purcell (0-5, 7); K Loughnane (0-4, 1f, 7), M O’Brien (0-3, 7), T Doyle (0-3, 7), C Lanigan (0-2, 6), H Fitzgibbon (0-2, 6), M Russell (0-1, 6), D Rossiter (0-1, 6).

28 July 2024 Round 1	Clonakenny	0-16 - 2-18	Boherlahan–Dualla	Littleton Grounds
	JJ Ryan (0-7f), C O’Dwyer (0-4); MJ Carroll (0-1), C Russell (0-1); C Shanahan (0-1), D Byrne (0-1), N Ryan (0-1).	Report	T Ryan (0-9, 5f); M Downey (2-1), E Ryan (0-3), D Hickey (0-2), J Ryan (0-1); C Darcy (0-1); J Kirby (0-1).

11 August 2024 Round 2	Clonakenny	1-25 - 1-15	Newport	St Michael's Park
	C O’Dwyer (1-16, 0-7f, 0-2’ 65s), N Ryan (0-3), M O’Sullivan (0-2), C Russell (0-2); MJ Carroll (0-1); D Byrne (0-1).	Report	Colin Floyd (0-5, 9), P Ryan (0-4, 1f), S Flanagan (1-0), C Flanagan (0-3), T Floyd (0-1f, 6); P O’Sullivan (0-1), M Quigley (0-1).

11 August 2024 Round 2	Boherlahan–Dualla	0-18 - 0-24	Thurles Sarsfields	Dundrum Grounds
	T Ryan (0-8, 7f), S Leahy (0-5), D Hickey (0-1), J Kirby (0-1), J Ryan (0-1); C Ryan (0-1), E Ryan (0-1).	Report	T Maher (0-6, 4f), H Fitzgibbon (0-3); C Lanigan (0-3), P Bourke (0-2), K Loughnane (0-2), M O’Brien (0-2), R Purcell (0-1); M Russell (0-1), J O’Mara (0-1), R Stapleton (0-1), T Doyle (0-1), K Costello (0-1).

24 August 2024 Round 3	Boherlahan–Dualla	1-16 - 0-16	Newport	Cappawhite Grounds
	T Ryan (0-5, 4f, 1 65); M Downey (1-1), J Kirby (0-4), D Hickey (0-2), S Leahy (0-2), E Ryan (0-2).	Report	Colin Floyd (0-6, 0-5f, 7), C Flanagan (0-5), O Connors (0-2), D O'Riordan (0-1), P Ryan (0-1f), S Flanagan (0-1).

24 August 2024 Round 3	Clonakenny	2-12 - 2-19	Thurles Sarsfields	St Michael's Park
	C O’Dwyer (1-2f); M O’Sullivan (1-1), N Ryan (0-4), JJ Ryan (0-2), P Byrne (0-1), W Ryan (0-1), C Shanahan (0-1).	Report	K Loughnane (1-2), M O’Brien (1-1), P Bourke (0-4), C Lanigan (0-4), R Purcell (0-4), T Maher (0-3, 3f), R Stapleton (0-1).

== Group 4 ==
=== Group 4 table ===
Advance to knockout stage Advance to relegation stage

Team	Matches				Score			Pts
Team	Pld	W	D	L	For	Against	Diff	Pts
St Mary's	3	3	0	0	62	45	17	6
Burgess	3	2	0	1	74	66	8	4
Killenaule	3	1	0	2	71	67	4	2
Seán Treacys	3	0	0	3	55	84	-29	0

=== Group 4 results ===
26 July 2024 Round 1	Killenaule	2-19 - 2-22	Burgess	Fr Kenyon Park
	P O’Dwyer (1-2); J O’Dwyer (0-6, 3f), P Feehan (1-2), J O’Dwyer (0-4), K O’Dwyer (0-2); C O’Dwyer (0-1f), M Doyle (0-1), E O’Connell (0-1).	Report	S Murray (0-10, 6f, 1 s-cut), S Kirwan (1-4); J Mulqueen (1-1); D Maher (0-3), E Hogan (0-2), D Ryan (0-2), K Grace (0-1).

28 July 2024 Round 1	St Mary's	1-20 - 0-14	Seán Treacys	New Inn Grounds
	S Kennedy (0-10, 6f), P McGarry (0-5), M Murphy (1-0), E Dunphy (0-2f), R Gunne (0-1), S Ryan (0-1), C Deely (0-1).	Report	P Dawson (0-6, 5f), C Kennedy (0-3), P Deegan (0-3), M Feehan (0-2).

10 August 2024 Round 2	Killenaule	3-24 - 1-18	Seán Treacys	Dundrum Grounds
	J O’Dwyer (1-9, 0-8f); L Ryan (1-4, 0-2f); P Feehan (1-2); M Stakelum (0-4), T Stakelum (0-2); D Fitzgerald (0-2), E Shaw (0-1).	Report	P Carey (0-7, 4f, 2 65s), P Deegan (1-3); P Dawson (0-2), B Carey (0-2f); M Feehan (0-1); C Kennedy (0-1); E Sheldon (0-1); J Ryan (0-1).

10 August 2024 Round 2	Burgess	2-12 - 1-18	St Mary's	Dundrum Grounds
	S Murray (0-8, 7f); M Ryan (1-2); D Maher (1-0); J Mulqueen (0-2).	Report	S Kennedy (0-7, 5f); M Murphy (1-1); C Deely (0-2); R Peters (0-2), J Power (0-2), N Hoctor (0-1), E Dunphy (0-1f); S Ryan (0-1); P McGarry (0-1).

23 August 2024 Round 3	Burgess	4-16 - 1-17	Seán Treacys	Fr Kenyon Park
	S Murray (1-9, 0-7f, 0-1 s-cut), B O’Flaherty (1-1), E Grace (1-1); T Dunne (1-0); M Ryan (0-2), K Grace (0-1); S Kirwan (0-1); D Maher (0-1).	Report	P Carey (0-14, 10f, 3 65’s), M Feehan (1-0); S Ryan (0-1, 65’); P Dawson (0-1); S Carr (0-1).

23 August 2024 Round 3	Killenaule	0-13 - 1-15	St Mary's	Barracks Field
	J O’Dwyer (0-4f), L Ryan (0-3f), T Stakelum (0-2), E Shaw (0-1), P O’Dwyer (0-1), C O’Dwyer (0-1f), P Feehan (0-1).	Report	S Kennedy (0-5f), P McGarry (0-5), N Hoctor (1-0), E Dunphy (0-3f), D O’Connor (0-1), R Leahy (0-1).

== Relegation stage ==
=== Relegation semi-finals ===
15 September 2024 Semi-final	Seán Treacys	0-21 - 2-19	Silvermines	Dundrum Grounds
	P Deegan 0-6, P Dawson 0-5, C Kennedy 0-2, C Egan 0-1, S Ryan 0-1, D Carr 0-1, S Carr 0-1, M Feehan 0-1, D O'Brien 0-1, T Hickey 0-1, C Kennedy 0-1.		C McKelvey 1-7, J Forde 0-8, M Corcoran 1-0, A Hayden 0-2, D McKelvey 0-1, D Treacy 0-1.

15 September 2024 Semi-final	Moyne–Templetuohy	1-23 - 1-18	Newport	Dundrum Grounds
	G O'Connor 0-15, M Kelly 1-0, T Meade 0-3, S Hayes 0-2, C Bowe 0-1, E Guilfoyle 0-1, C Deegan 0-1.		P Ryan 0-11, O Connors 1-0, C Flanagan 0-3, C O'Mahony 0-2, P O'Sullivan 0-1, B Coffey 0-1.

=== Relegation final ===
29 September 2024 Final	Newport	1-18 - 2-15	Seán Treacys	MacDonagh Park
	C Floyd 0-11, O Connors 1-1, P Ryan 0-3, S Flanagan 0-2, C Flanagan 0-1, C O'Mahony 0-1.	Report	P Carey 0-9, M Feehan 1-1, P Deegan 0-4, J Ryan 1-0, B Carey 0-1.

12 October 2024 Final replay	Newport	1-19 - 2-19	Seán Treacys	MacDonagh Park
	C Floyd 1-8, P Ryan 0-3, C O'Mahony 0-2, C Floyd 0-2, C Flanagan 0-2, A Moloney 0-1, O Connors 0-1.	Report	P Carey 1-7, M Feehan 1-3, S Ryan 0-2, D Carr 0-2, S Carr 0-2, C Kennedy 0-1, P Deegan 0-1, P Dawson 0-1.

== Knockout stage ==
=== Preliminary quarter-final ===
8 September 2024 Preliminary quarter-final	Cashel King Cormacs	1-22 - 1-18	Boherlahan–Dualla	Dundrum Grounds
	R Bonnar 1-4, E Connolly 0-6, R Connolly 0-4, D Ryan 0-4, D McGrath 0-2, C Quinn 0-1, O O'Donoghue 0-1.		T Ryan 0-11, D Hickey 1-0, J Kirby 0-2, E Ryan 0-2, S Leahy 0-2, C Darcy 0-1.

=== Quarter-finals ===
14 September 2024 Quarter-final	Cashel King Cormacs	3-25 - 1-11	Thurles Sarsfields	St Michael's Park
	R Bonner 2-3, E Connolly 0-6, D Ryan 0-6, J Cummins 1-0, C Quinn 0-3, A Cummins 0-2, D McGrath 0-2, G Browne 0-1, R Connolly 0-1, O O'Donoghue 0-1.		H Fitzgibbon 1-0, C Lanigan 0-3, R Purcell 0-2, K Loughnane 0-2, T Maher 0-2, T Doyle 0-1, M O'Brien 0-1.

14 September 2024 Quarter-final	Éire Óg Annacarty/Donohill	0-16 - 3-13	Upperchurch–Drombane	Kilcommon Grounds
	A Griffin 0-7, D Crosse 0-3, D Mooney 0-1, D Fox 0-1, D O'Dwyer 0-1, C O'Brien 0-1, C Bradshaw 0-1, D Kelly 0-1.		P Ryan 0-7, P Greene 1-3, P Shanahan 1-0, A Ryan 1-0, D Grant 0-1, P Phelan 0-1, G Ryan 0-1.

15 September 2024 Quarter-final	St Mary's	0-13 - 4-18	Gortnahoe–Glengoole	Clonoulty Grounds
	S Kennedy 0-8, R Peters 0-2, E Dunphy 0-2, C Deely 0-1.		D Corbett 2-1, K Hayes 0-6, D Maher 1-2, A Maher 1-1, J Moore 0-3, C Gleeson 0-2, R Teehan 0-1, F Cleary 0-1, B Maher 0-1.

15 September 2024 Quarter-final	Carrick Swans	1-21 - 1-12	Burgess	Clonoulty Grounds
	C Lanigan 0-10, A O'Halloran 1-0, E O'Halloran 0-3, C Walsh 0-3, A Dunne 0-2, D Waters 0-1, A Waters 0-1, D O'Hanlon 0-1.		S Murray 1-11, D Maher 0-1.

=== Semi-finals ===
28 September 2024 Semi-final	Cashel King Cormacs	6-21 - 2-28 (aet)	Upperchurch–Drombane	FBD Semple Stadium
	E Connolly (1-6, 1-0 pen, 0-3f, 0-1 s-cut); O O’Donoghue (2-1); D Ryan (0-7, 3f), D McGrath (1-1), A Cummins (1-0), G Browne (1-0), C Quinn (0-2), R Bonnar (0-2), R Connolly (0-1); P Fahy (0-1).	Report	P Greene (1-6, 0-2f), P Phelan (1-3), Paul Ryan (0-6, 5f), G Ryan (0-4, 2f), Pat Ryan (0-3), N Grant (0-2), D Grant (0-2), A O'Donoghue (0-1); C Fahey (0-1).

29 September 2024 Semi-final	Carrick Swans	0-18 - 0-14	Gortnahoe–Glengoole	FBD Semple Stadium
	C Lanigan (0-9, 7f), A Dunne (0-3), C Walsh (0-2), D O’Hanlon (0-1), B Mulcaire (0-1); A O’Halloran (0-1), E O’Halloran (0-1).	Report	K Hayes (0-11, 5f), C Gleeson (0-2), D Maher (0-1).

=== Final ===
13 October 2024 Final	Cashel King Cormacs	2-17 - 0-19	Carrick Swans	FBD Semple Stadium
	D Ryan (1-7,4fs), E Connolly (1-2); D McGrath (0-2), R Bonner (0-2); A Walsh (0-1), C O Dwyer(0-1), O O’Donoghue(0-1); G Browne (0-1).	Report	C Lanigan (0-14, 12fs), A Dunne (0-2), D Waters (0-1); D O'Hanlon (0-1), C Walsh (0-1).	Referee: M Kennedy (Silvermines)

== Championship statistics ==
=== Top scorers ===
Rank	Player	Club	Tally	Total	Matches	Average
1	Devon Ryan	Cashel King Cormacs	3-44	53	7	7.57
2	Keane Hayes	Gortnahoe–Glengoole	2-45	51	5	10.20
2	Gearóid O'Connor	Moyne–Templetuohy	0-51	51	4	12.75
4	Callum Lanigan	Carrick Swans	1-46	49	5	8.20
5	Stephen Murray	Burgess	2-38	44	4	11.00
6	Paddy Carey	Seán Treacys	1-37	40	5	8.00
7	Eoghan Connolly	Cashel King Cormacs	3-28	37	7	5.28
8	Jason Forde	Silvermines	0-34	34	4	8.50
9	Pa Ryan	Newport	1-30	33	6	5.50
9	Tomás Ryan	Boherlahan–Dualla	0-33	33	4	8.25
