= 2026 Tipperary Premier Intermediate Hurling Championship =

Hurling competition season

- Dates: 26 July – 11 October 2026
- Teams: 16
- Sponsor: FBD Insurance
- Champions: St Mary's (1st title); Séamus Kennedy (captain); Jamie Wall (manager)
- Runners-up: Killenaule; Killian O'Dwyer (captain); Joe Caesar (manager)
- Relegated: Templederry Kenyons

The 2026 Tipperary Premier Intermediate Hurling Championship was the 10th staging of the Tipperary Premier Intermediate Hurling Championship since its establishment by the Tipperary County Board in 2017 and subsequent rebranding in 2022. The draws for the group stage pairings took place on 2 April 2026. The championship ran from 26 July to 11 October 2026.

The final was played on 11 October 2026 at FBD Semple Stadium in Thurles, between St Mary's and Killenaule, in what was their first ever meeting in the final. St Mary's won the match by 0–21 to 1–15 to claim their first ever championship title.

== Team changes ==
=== To Championship ===
Relegated from the Tipperary Senior Hurling Championship

- Lorrha

Promoted from the Tipperary Intermediate Hurling Championship

- Golden–Kilfeacle

=== From Championship ===
Promoted to the Tipperary Senior Hurling Championship

- Upperchurch–Drombane

Relegated to the Tipperary Intermediate Hurling Championship

- Clonakenny

== Group 1 ==
=== Group 1 table ===
Quarter-finalist Preliminary quarter-finalist Relegation stage

Team	Matches				Score			Pts
Team	Pld	W	D	L	For	Against	Diff	Pts
Moyne–Templetuohy	3	1	2	0	82	71	9	4
Seán Treacys	3	2	0	1	84	90	-6	4
Gortnahoe–Glengoole	3	1	1	1	73	69	4	3
Silvermines	3	0	1	2	68	77	-9	1

== Group 2 ==
=== Group 2 table ===
Quarter-finalist Preliminary quarter-finalist Relegation stage

Team	Matches				Score			Pts
Team	Pld	W	D	L	For	Against	Diff	Pts
Killenaule	3	3	0	0	70	50	20	6
St Mary's	3	2	0	1	75	71	4	4
Thurles Sarsfields	3	1	0	2	67	80	-13	2
Carrick Swans	3	0	0	3	72	83	-11	0

== Group 3 ==
=== Group 3 table ===
Quarter-finalist Preliminary quarter-finalist Relegation stage

Team	Matches				Score			Pts
Team	Pld	W	D	L	For	Against	Diff	Pts
Lorrha	3	2	1	0	80	70	10	5
Moneygall	3	2	0	1	71	49	22	4
Burgess	3	1	0	2	65	71	-6	2
Templederry Kenyons (R)	3	0	1	2	64	90	-26	1

== Group 4 ==
=== Group 4 table ===
Quarter-finalist Preliminary quarter-finalist Relegation stage

Team	Matches				Score			Pts
Team	Pld	W	D	L	For	Against	Diff	Pts
Golden–Kilfeacle	3	3	0	0	94	73	21	6
Boherlahan–Dualla	3	2	0	1	73	62	11	4
Éire Óg Annacarty/Donohill	3	0	1	2	63	76	-13	1
Ballina	3	0	1	2	57	76	-19	1

== Relegation stage ==
=== Relegation semi-finals ===
12 September 2026 Semi-final	Ballina	0-29 - 2-21	Templederry Kenyons	Dolla Grounds

13 September 2026 Semi-final	Silvermines	1-19 - 1-21	Carrick Swans	Páirc Ciocaim

=== Relegation final ===
26 September 2026 Final	Carrick Swans	3-16 - 1-21	Templederry Kenyons	Boherlahan Grounds

== Knockout stage ==
=== Preliminary quarter-finals ===
5 September 2026 Pre q/f	Seán Treacy's	0-23 - 1-23	Thurles Sarsfields	Drombane Grounds

6 September 2026 Pre q/f	Boherlahan–Dualla	4-14 - 2-19	Silvermines	Páirc Shíleáin

6 September 2026 Pre q/f	Moneygall	3-13 - 3-22	Éire Óg Annacarty/Donohill	Littleton Grounds

=== Quarter-finals ===
12 September 2026 Quarter-final	Killenaule	0-21 - 0-20	Boherlahan–Dualla	Leahy Park

13 September 2026 Quarter-final	Golden–Kilfeacle	1-20 - 1-23	Thurles Sarsfields	Clonoulty Grounds

13 September 2026 Quarter-final	Moyne–Templetuohy	0-12 - 3-22	St Mary's	Boherlahan Grounds

13 September 2026 Quarter-final	Lorrha	3-19 - 1-27	Éire Óg Annacarty/Donohill	Fr Kenyon Park

=== Semi-finals ===
26 September 2026 Semi-final	Killenaule	0-20 - 1-15	Éire Óg Annacarty/Donohill	FBD Semple Stadium
	T Ryan (0-10, 0-7f), T Stakelum 0-3, M Stakelum 0-2, E Shaw, C Barrett, P Feehan, L Ryan, M Doyle all 0-1 each.	Report	A Griffin (1-4, 0-3f), D Kelly (0-4), D Crosse 0-3, B Fox, D O’Dwyer, P Bradshaw, T Fox all 0-1 each.

27 September 2026 Semi-final	St Mary's	2-22 - 1-17	Thurles Sarsfields	FBD Semple Stadium
	C Deely 1-2, P McGarry 0-5f, T Charles 1-0, A Cagney, S Kennedy, S Ryan 0-3 each, R Leahy, S Kennedy 0-2 each, H Lawlor 0-1, E Dunphy 0-1f.	Report	J Lanigan (0-6, 0-5f), T Doyle 0-4, L McCormack 0-3, S Butler 1-0, P Bourke, C Moloney 0-2 each.

=== Final ===
11 October 2026 Final	St Mary's	0-21 - 1-15	Killenaule	FBD Semple Stadium
	P McGarry (0-9, 0-6f), A Cagney 0-5, T Charles 0-3, T Condon (0-2, 2 sideline cuts), C Deely, T Sheehan 0-1 each.	Report	T Ryan (0-5, 0-2f), E Shaw 1-0, J O’Dwyer 0-3, P O’Dwyer 0-1f, T Stakelum 0-2, D Doyle, T Keaveney, M Stakelum, P Feehan 0-1 each.
