= 2022 Tipperary Premier Intermediate Hurling Championship =

- Dates: 22 July – 23 October 2022
- Teams: 16
- Sponsor: FBD Insurance
- Champions: Roscrea (1st title); Conor Sheedy (captain); Shane Fletcher (captain); Liam England (manager)
- Runners-up: Gortnahoe–Glengoole; Davy Nolan (captain); Jim Rafter (manager)
- Relegated: Kiladangan

Tournament statistics
- Top scorer(s): Keane Hayes (1-66)

The 2022 Tipperary Premier Intermediate Hurling Championship was the sixth staging of the Tipperary Premier Intermediate Hurling Championship since its establishment by the Tipperary County Board in 2017 and subsequent rebranding in 2022. The championship ran from 22 July to 23 October 2022.

The final was played on 23 October 2022 at FBD Semple Stadium in Thurles, between Roscrea and Gortnahoe–Glengoole, in what was their first ever meeting in the final. Roscrea won the match by 1-17 to 0-16 to claim their first ever championship title.

Keane Hayes was the championship's top scorer with 1-66.

== Relegation stage ==
=== Relegation final ===
8 October 2022 Final	Carrick Swans	1-18 - 0-17	Kiladangan	Templetuohy Grounds
		Report

== Knockout stage ==
=== Preliminary quarter-finals ===
10 September 2022 Preliminary quarter-final	Carrick Swans	2-25 - 2-26 (aet)	Silvermines	Boherlahen Grounds
		Report

11 September 2022 Preliminary quarter-final	Clonakenny	2-17 - 1-17	Burgess	FBD Semple Stadium
		Report

=== Quarter-finals ===
24 September 2022 Quarter-final	Burgess	3-27 - 2-23 (aet)	Cashel King Cormacs	Bishop Quinlan Park
		Report

24 September 2022 Quarter-final	Gortnahoe–Glengoole	1-22 - 2-16	Portroe	Bishop Quinlan Park
		Report

25 September 2022 Quarter-final	Roscrea	2-26 - 2-14	Thurles Sarsfields	St Michael's Park
		Report

25 September 2022 Quarter-final	St Mary's	1-18 - 1-11	Silvermines	St Michael's Park
		Report

=== Semi-finals ===
8 October 2022 Semi-final	Gortnahoe–Glengoole	3-18 - 0-22	St Mary's	Leahy Park
		Report

8 October 2022 Semi-final	Roscrea	1-19 - 1-17	Burgess	MacDonagh Park
		Report

=== Final ===
23 October 2022 Final	Roscrea	1-17 - 0-16	Gortnahoe–Glengoole	FBD Semple Stadium
	L Cashin (3 frees), A Tynan, S Fletcher 0-4 each; C Dooley 1-0; E Fitzpatrick, C Sheedy 0-2 each; J Fitzpatrick 0-1.	Report	K Hayes 0-9 (7 frees, 1 65); B Maher, R Teehan 0-2 each; J Moore, A Maher, D Maher 0-1 each.	Referee: M Kennedy (Newcastle)
