= Pat Fitzgerald (hurler) =

Irish hurler (1881–1970)

Personal information
- Native name: Pádraig Mac Gearailt (Irish)
- Nickname: Foxy
- Born: 16 December 1881 Gortnahoe, County Tipperary, Ireland
- Died: 26 July 1970 (aged 88) Gortnahoe, County Tipperary, Ireland
- Occupation: Farmer

Sport
- Sport: Hurling
Club
- Years: Club
- Gortnahoe–Glengoole
Club titles
- Tipperary titles: 0
Inter-county
- Years: County
- 1908-1910: Tipperary
Inter-county titles
- Munster titles: 2
- All-Irelands: 1

Patrick Fitzgerald (16 December 1881 – 26 June 1970) was an Irish hurler. His championship career with the Tipperary senior team lasted from 1908 until 1910, during which time he won one All-Ireland Championship medal.

== Honours ==
Tipperary

- All-Ireland Senior Hurling Championship (1): 1908
- Munster Senior Hurling Championship (2): 1908, 1909
