= Pat Leahy (Tipperary hurler) =

Irish hurler

Personal information
- Native name: Pádraig Ó Liathaigh (Irish)
- Born: 1857 Gortnahoe, County Tipperary, Ireland
- Died: Unknown
- Occupation: Farmer

Sport
- Sport: Hurling
Club
- Years: Club
- Gortnahoe–Glengoole
Club titles
- Tipperary titles: 0
Inter-county
- Years: County
- 1887: Tipperary
Inter-county titles
- All-Irelands: 1

Patrick Leahy (born 1857) was an Irish hurler who played for the Tipperary senior team.

Leahy made his first appearance for the team during the inaugural championship of 1887. During that successful year he won one All-Ireland medal.

At club level Leahy played with Gortnahoe–Glengoole.
