= Johnny Moriarty =

Irish hurler

Personal information
- Native name: Seán Ó Muircheartaigh (Irish)
- Born: November 1945 (age 80–81) Gortnahoe, County Tipperary, Ireland
- Occupation: Retired Roadmaster employee/Carpenter
- Height: 6 ft 0 in (183 cm)

Sport
- Sport: Hurling
- Position: Goalkeeper/Wing Forward
Club
- Years: Club
- 1969-1980: Fenians
Club titles
- Kilkenny titles: 5
- Leinster titles: 1
- All-Ireland Titles: 0
Inter-county*
Years	County	Apps (scores)
1970-1971	Kilkenny	1 (0-00)
Inter-county titles
- Leinster titles: 0
- All-Irelands: 0
- NHL: 0
- *Inter County team apps and scores correct as of 21:34, 14 March 2017.

Johnny Moriarty (born November 1945) was an Irish hurler. His league and championship career with the Kilkenny senior team lasted one season from 1970 until 1971.

Born in Gortnahoe, County Tipperary, Moriarty first played competitive hurling with Gortnahoe–Glengoole, with whom he won a Mid-Tipperary junior championship medal. After emigrating to London Moriarty played for the Young Irelands team before being headhunted by the St. Gabriel's club. After returning to Ireland he joined the Fenains club in Johnstown. In a career than spanned over a decade, Moriarty won one Leinster medal and five county senior championship medals.

Moriarty was first considered for inter-county duty when he went for a trial with the Tipperary intermediate team in 1968. While he did not make the Tipperary team, he next appeared as a member of the Kilkenny senior team during the 1970-71 league. Moriarty played no part during the subsequent provincial championship and was an unused substitute for the 1971 All-Ireland final.

== Career statistics ==
Team	Year	Division	National League		Leinster		All-Ireland		Total	
Team	Year	Division	Apps	Score	Apps	Score	Apps	Score	Apps	Score
Kilkenny	1970-71	Division 1A	8	1-06	0	0-00	1	0-00	9	1-06
Total			8	1-06	0	0-00	1	0-00	9	1-06
