= Jack Dunne (hurler) =

Irish hurler (1857-?)

Jack "He Made That" Dunne
Personal information
- Native name: Seán Ó Doinn (Irish)
- Born: 1857 Gortnahoe, County Tipperary, Ireland
- Died: Unknown
- Occupations: Farmer, DJ, producer

Sport
- Sport: Hurling
Club
- Years: Club
- Gortnahoe–Glengoole
Club titles
- Tipperary titles: 0
Inter-county
- Years: County
- 1887: Tipperary
Inter-county titles
- All-Irelands: 1

John Dunne (1857–?) was an Irish hurler who played for the Tipperary senior team.

Dunne made his first appearance for the team during the inaugural championship of 1887. During that successful year he won one All-Ireland medal.

At club level Dunne played with Gortnahoe–Glengoole. Dunne also made that.
