= Micheál Ryan =

Irish hurler

Personal information
- Native name: Mícheál Ó Riain (Irish)
- Born: 1978 (age 47–48) Templederry, County Tipperary, Ireland

Sport
- Sport: Hurling
- Position: Left wing-back
Club
- Years: Club
- Templederry Kenyons
Club titles
- Tipperary titles: 0
Inter-county
- Years: County
- 2000-2003: Tipperary
Inter-county titles
- Munster titles: 0
- All-Irelands: 1
- NHL: 1
- All Stars: 0

Micheál Ryan (born 1978) is an Irish hurler who played as a left wing-back for the Tipperary senior team.

Ryan joined the team during the 2000 championship and was a member of the team until he left the panel after the 2003 championship. An All-Ireland medalist in the minor grade, he later won an All-Ireland winners' medal and a National Hurling League winners' medal at senior level.

At club level Ryan plays with the Templederry Kenyons club.
