= Paudie O'Neill =

Irish hurler and Gaelic footballer

Personal information
- Native name: Páidí Ó Néill (Irish)
- Born: 1957 (age 68–69) Clonmel, County Tipperary, Ireland
- Occupation: Primary school principal

Sport
Clubs
- Years: Club
- St Mary's; Clonmel Commercials; Ballyboden St Enda's
Inter-county
- Years: County
- 1977–1983 1987: Tipperary (football); Dublin (hurling)
Inter-county titles
	Football	Hurling
Munster Titles	0	0
All-Ireland Titles	0	0
League titles	0	0
All-Stars	0	0

Paudie O'Neill (born 1957) is an Irish former hurler and Gaelic footballer who played for the Tipperary and Dublin senior teams.

Born in Clonmel, County Tipperary, O'Neill first arrived on the inter-county scene at the age of seventeen when he first linked up with the Tipperary minor teams as a dual player, before later joining the under-21 sides. He made his senior debut during the 1977 championship. O'Neill went on to play a key part for Tipperary as a footballer before later spending one championship season with Dublin.

At club level he is a one-time championship medallist in football with Clonmel Commercials. He also played hurling with St Mary's and Ballyboden St Enda's.

In retirement from playing O'Neill has become involved in team management and coaching. He has been heavily involved in various coaching roles with Ballyboden St Enda's before becoming a selector to the Tipperary senior hurling team in 2012. He later took up a coaching role with Westmeath.
