= John Costigan (hurler) =

Irish hurler

Personal information
- Native name: Seán Mac Oistigín (Irish)
- Born: June 1945 (age 81) Bournea, County Tipperary, Ireland
- Occupation: Secondary school teacher
- Height: 5 ft 10 in (178 cm)

Sport
- Sport: Hurling
- Position: Right corner-back
Club
- Years: Club
- Clonakenny
Club titles
- Tipperary titles: 0
College
- Years: College
- 1963-1966: Maynooth College
College titles
- Fitzgibbon titles: 0
Inter-county
- Years: County
- 1966-1972: Tipperary
Inter-county titles
- Munster titles: 1
- All-Irelands: 0
- NHL: 1
- All Stars: 0

John Costigan (born June 1945) is an Irish former hurling coach, player and Gaelic games administrator. At club level, he played with Clonakenny and at inter-county level was a member of the Tipperary senior hurling team.

== Playing career ==
Costigan first played hurling and Gaelic football to a high standard as a student at Templemore CBS. He won a Rice Cup medal with the school in 1962, before later attending Maynooth University. At club level, Costigan played with Clonakenny and won a Tipperary JAFC medal in 1966, before claiming a Tipperary JAHC medal in 1967.

At inter-county level, Costigan first played for Tipperary as a member of the minor team in 1963. He later progressed to the under-21 grade and was part of the Tipperary team beaten by Wexford in the 1965 All-Ireland under-21 final.

Costigan joined the senior team in 1966 and, following John Doyle's retirement, later became the team's first-choice right corner-back. He won a National League–Munster SHC double in 1968 before being beaten by Wexford in that year's All-Ireland final. Costigan added a Railway Cup medal to his collection in 1969. He ended his inter-county career with the intermediate team and won an All-Ireland IHC medal in 1972.

== Post-playing career ==
In his day job as a teacher at Templemore CBS, Costigan was associated with 53 winning teams in both hurling and Gaelic football, including the Harty Cup and Croke Cup successes in 1978. He was also a selector when Tipperary won the Munster MHC title in 1993.

Costigan became the first chairman of the newly established JK Brackens club in 1992. He was elected chairman of the Tipperary County Board in 2006. Costigan subsequently served on the Munster Council, Central Council and several other county and national GAA committees.

== Honours ==
=== Player ===
Templemore CBS

- Rice Cup: 1962

Clonakenny

- Tipperary Junior A Hurling Championship: 1967
- Tipperary Junior A Football Championship: 1966

Tipperary

- Munster Senior Hurling Championship: 1968
- National Hurling League: 1967–68
- All-Ireland Intermediate Hurling Championship: 1972
- Munster Intermediate Hurling Championship: 1972
- Munster Under-21 Hurling Championship: 1965

Munster

- Railway Cup: 1969

=== Management ===
Templemore CBS

- Dr Croke Cup: 1978
- Dr Harty Cup: 1978

Tipperary

- Munster Minor Hurling Championship: 1993

Sporting positions
Preceded by Donal Shanahan	Chairman of the Tipperary County Board of the GAA; 2006-2008	Succeeded by Barry O'Brien
