= Thomas Stapleton (hurler) =

Irish hurler (born 1988)

Personal information
- Native name: Tomás Mac an Ghaill (Irish)
- Born: 22 February 1988 (age 38) Templederry, County Tipperary, Ireland
- Height: 6 ft 1 in (185 cm)

Sport
- Sport: Hurling
- Position: Right wing-back
Club
- Years: Club
- Templederry Kenyons
Club titles
- Tipperary titles: 0
Inter-county
Years	County	Apps (scores)
2007-present	Tipperary	11 (0-2)
Inter-county titles
- Munster titles: 1
- All-Irelands: 0
- NHL: 0
- All Stars: 0

Thomas Stapleton (born 22 February 1988) is an Irish hurler who currently plays as a right wing-back for the Tipperary senior team.

Stapleton made his first appearance for the team during the 2007 National League and has become a regular player over the last few seasons. Since then he has won one Munster winners' medal on the field of play.

At club level Stapleton is a county intermediate championship medalist with Templederry Kenyons.

== Playing career ==
=== Club ===
Stapelton plays his club hurling with Stapelton with Templederry Kenyons and has enjoyed some success. In 2008 he won a county intermediate championship medal.

=== Inter-county ===
Stapleton first came to prominence on the inter-county scene as a member of the Tipperary minor hurling team in 2005. He enjoyed little success in his first year, however, Tipperary reached the All-Ireland decider via the "back-door" in 2006. Three-in-a-row hopefuls Galway provided the opposition, however, Tipp powered to 2–18 to 2–7 victory. It was Stapleton's first All-Ireland medal in that grade.

He subsequently joined the Tipperary under-21 team. Stapleton won a Munster medal in this grade in 2008 following a controversial one-point defeat of Clare. Tipp later reached the All-Ireland, however, Maher's side were defeated by Kilkenny.

Stapleton made his senior competitive debut for Tipperary in a National Hurling League game against Dublin in 2007. Later that season he made his championship debut against Limerick, in what turned out to be an unsuccessful championship campaign.

After falling out of favour with Liam Sheedy's new management team, Stapleton remained on the periphery of the team for a number of seasons.

Stapelton was back on the starting fifteen in 2012. A subsequent 2–17 to 0–16 defeat of Waterford in the provincial decider gave him his first Munster medal on the field of play. Tipperary later faced a humiliating 4–24 to 1–15 defeat by eventual champions Kilkenny in the All-Ireland semi-final.
