= Eoghan Connolly =

Irish hurler

Personal information
- Occupation: Electrician

Sport
- Sport: Hurling
- Position: Full-back
Club
- Years: Club
- Cashel King Cormacs
Inter-county*
Years	County	Apps (scores)
2021–	Tipperary	19 (0-33)
Inter-county titles
- titles: 0
- All-Irelands: 1
- NHL: 0
- All Stars: 1
- *Inter County team apps and scores correct as of match played 24 May 2026.

Eoghan Connolly is an Irish sportsperson. He plays hurling with his local club Cashel King Cormacs and with the Tipperary senior inter-county team since 2021.

== Career ==
Connolly made his league debut on 13 June 2021 against Waterford when he came on as a late substitute.

He made his Championship debut on 21 May 2023 when he started in the half-back line against Limerick in the 2023 Munster Championship.

On 20 July in the 2025 All-Ireland final, Connolly started at full-back as Tipperary defeated Cork by 3-27 to 1-19 and claim a 29th All-Ireland title.

== Career statistics ==
(Championship only) As of match played 24 May 2026

Team	Year	National League			Munster		All-Ireland		Total	
Team	Year	Division	Apps	Score	Apps	Score	Apps	Score	Apps	Score
Tipperary	2021	Division 1A					—			
Tipperary	2022	Division 1B					—			
Tipperary	2023	Division 1B			2	0-00	2	0-01	4	0-01
Tipperary	2024	Division 1B			4	0-05	—		4	0-05
Tipperary	2025	Division 1A			4	0-10	3	0-04	7	0-14
Tipperary	2026	Division 1A			4	0-13			4	0-13
Career total					14	0-28	5	0-05	19	0-33

== Honours ==
Cashel Community School

- Tipperary PPS Under-17B Hurling Championship: 2017

Cashel King Cormacs

- Tipperary Premier Intermediate Hurling Championship: 2024

Tipperary

- All-Ireland Senior Hurling Championship: 2025
- All-Ireland Under-21 Hurling Championship: 2018
- All-Ireland Under-20 Hurling Championship: 2019
- Munster Under-20 Hurling Championship: 2019

Individual

- The Sunday Game Team of the Year (1): 2025
- All Star Award (1): 2025
