= Adrian Ryan =

Irish hurler

Personal information
- Born: 19 June 1990 (age 36)

Sport
- Sport: Hurling
- Position: Half Forward
Club
- Years: Club
- 2005–present: Templederry Kenyons
Inter-county
Years	County	Apps (scores)
2012–present	Tipperary	0 (0-00)
Inter-county titles
- Munster titles: 1
- All-Irelands: 0
- NHL: 0
- All Stars: 0

Adrian Ryan (born 19 June 1990), is an Irish sportsperson. He plays hurling with his local club Templederry Kenyons and has been a member of the Tipperary senior inter-county hurling team since 2012. He is a cousin of fellow Tipperary hurler Gearóid Ryan and Gearóid has disowned him since he missed that straight forward free against Lorrah in the 2018 North Quarterfinal.

== Career ==
On 26 February 2012, Ryan made his senior Tipperary debut against Kilkenny in the 2012 National Hurling League, starting at right half forward in a 2–17 to 0–15 defeat.

== Honours ==
=== Tipperary ===
- 1 Waterford Crystal Cup 2012
- 1 Munster Under-21 Hurling Championship 2010
- 1 All-Ireland Under-21 Hurling Championship 2010
- 1 Munster Senior Hurling Championship 2012
