= Willie Smith (hurler) =

Irish hurler

Personal information
- Native name: Liam Mac Gabhann (Irish)
- Born: 1944 (age 81–82) Clonakenny, County Tipperary, Ireland

Sport
- Sport: Hurling
- Position: Left corner-back
Club
- Years: Club
- Clonakenny
Club titles
- Tipperary titles: 0
College
- Years: College
- 1962-1968: University College Dublin
College titles
- Fitzgibbon titles: 3
Inter-county
| Years | County | Apps (scores) |
| 1963-1964 | Tipperary | 0 (0-00) |
Inter-county titles
- Munster titles: 1
- All-Irelands: 0
- NHL: 0
- All Stars: 0

William J. Smith (born 1944) is an Irish former hurler. At club level he played with Clonakenny and was also a member of the Tipperary senior hurling team.

== Career ==
Smith first played hurling at juvenile and underage levels with a Na Fianna combination and won consecutive Mid Tipperary MAHC titles in 1961 and 1962. At adult level he lined out with Clonakenny and was part of the club's junior team that won the Tipperary JAHC title in 1967. Smith also lined out as a student with University College Dublin and won three Fitzgibbon Cup titles.

Smith first appeared at inter-county level as a dual minor in 1962. He was a member of the Tipperary minor hurling team that lost the 1962 All-Ireland minor final to Kilkenny. Smith subsequently spent two seasons with the under-21 team and was at right corner-back on the first Tipperary team to win an All-Ireland U21HC title in 1964. He also lined out with the intermediate and senior teams that year and was a non-playing substitute when Tipperary beat Cork in the 1964 Munster SHC final.

== Family ==
His brother, Michael Smith, served as a Fianna Fáil TD for Tipperary North at various times between 1969 and 2007. He also served as a minister in the governments of Charles Haughey, Albert Reynolds and Bertie Ahern.

== Honours ==
University College Dublin

- Fitzgibbon Cup: 1964, 1965, 1968

Clonakenny

- Tipperary Junior A Hurling Championship: 1967
- Mid Tipperary Junior A Hurling Championship: 1964, 1967

Tipperary

- Munster Senior Hurling Championship: 1964
- All-Ireland Under-21 Hurling Championship: 1964
- Munster Under-21 Hurling Championship: 1964, 1965
- Munster Minor Hurling Championship: 1962
