= Paddy Creedon =

Irish hurler

Sport
- Sport: Hurling
- Position: Half-forward
Club
- Years: Club
- Thurles Sarsfields
Club titles
- Tipperary titles: 1
Inter-county
| Years | County | Apps (scores) |
| 2023 - | Tipperary | 0 |
Inter-county titles
- Munster titles: 0
- All-Irelands: 0
- NHL: 0
- All Stars: 0

Paddy Creedon is an Irish hurler who plays club hurling for Thurles Sarsfields and at inter-county level with the Tipperary senior hurling team.

== Career ==
On 19 March 2023, he made his league debut for Tipperary in the fifth round of the 2023 National Hurling League, coming on as a substitute against Antrim, as Tipperary won by 4–28 to 2–17.

== Honours ==
Thurles Sarsfields

- Tipperary Senior Hurling Championship (1): 2026
