= Josh Keller (hurler) =

Irish hurler (born 1999)

Personal information
- Born: Nenagh, County Tipperary, Ireland

Sport
- Sport: Hurling
- Position: forward
Club
- Years: Club
- Nenagh Éire Óg
Club titles
- Tipperary titles: 0
Inter-county
- Years: County
- 2025–: Tipperary
Inter-county titles
- Munster titles: 0
- All-Irelands: 1
- NHL: 0
- All Stars: 0

Josh Keller is an Irish hurler who plays for Tipperary Senior Championship club Nenagh Éire Óg and at inter-county level with the Tipperary senior hurling team. He usually lines out in the half-forward line.

== Career ==
On 2 February 2025, Keller made his senior debut for Tipperary in the 2025 National Hurling League when he started against Wexford.

== Honours ==
Tipperary

- All-Ireland Senior Hurling Championship (1): 2025
