= Tipperary Premier Intermediate Hurling Championship =

- Current season or competition: 2026 Tipperary Premier Intermediate Hurling Championship
- Code: Hurling
- Founded: 2017; 9 years ago
- Region: Tipperary (GAA)
- Trophy: Séamus Ó Riain Cup
- No. of teams: 16
- Title holders: St Mary's (1st title)
- First winner: Toomevara
- Sponsors: FBD Insurance
- Official website: Official website

The Tipperary Premier Intermediate Hurling Championship, formerly Séamus Ó Riain Cup, (known for sponsorship reasons as the FBD Insurance Tipperary Premier Intermediate Hurling Championship) is an annual hurling competition organised by the Tipperary County Board of the Gaelic Athletic Association since 2017 for the second tier hurling teams in the county of Tipperary in Ireland.

The series of games are played during the spring, summer and autumn months with the cup final currently being played at Semple Stadium in October. It is sometimes played as the curtain-raiser to the senior final. The prize for the winning team is the Séamus Ó Riain Cup. The cup begins with a group stage and is followed by a knock-out stage.

St Mary' are the title-holders after defeating Killenaule by 0-21 to 1-15 in the 2026 cup final.

== History ==
The Séamus Ó Riain Cup was created in 2017 in an effort to reduce the number of teams in the Tipperary Senior Hurling Championship. The cup was created for Roinn II teams. The Séamus Ó Riain Cup has been described as a senior hurling 'B' grade, though without the off-putting 'B' letter being used. From the 2022 Championship, the competition was renamed the Tipperary Premier Intermediate Hurling Championship following a vote at the Tipperary County Board. The winners will then go on to represent Tipperary in the All-Ireland Intermediate Club Hurling Championship.

== Format ==
=== Group stage ===
For the group stage there are four groups of four teams. The teams are ranked based on their performance the previous year.

Teams will play the other three teams in the group once and match points will be awarded depending on the result of each game, with teams receiving two points for a win, and one for a draw.

Following the completion of the group stage, the four group winners, and the four group runners-up qualify for the knock-out stage.

=== Knock-out stage ===
The four group winners are seeded and play a runner-up not from their group. Teams in the same group are kept apart until the final, if they make it that far.

== Sponsorship ==
Since 2017 the Séamus Ó Riain Cup has been sponsored by Tipperary Water. Since 2019 the championship is sponsored by FBD Holdings.

== Trophy ==
The winning team is presented with the Séamus Ó Riain Cup. A national school teacher by profession, Séamus Ó Riain (1916-2007) began his career in the administrative affairs of the Gaelic Athletic Association when he was elected secretary of the Moneygall club before later representing the club on the North Tipperary Board. In 1955 he was elected vice-chairman of the board before serving as chairman between 1957 and 1966. Ó Riain's growing expertise as an administrator was further rewarded in 1958 when he was elected as one of top Tipperary delegates on the Munster Council. In 1962 he was elected vice-chairman of the provincial council before taking over as chairman in 1965. Ó Riain served as the 22nd President of the Gaelic Athletic Association from 1967 until 1970.

== Roll of honour ==
=== By club ===
#	Club	Titles	Runners-up	Championships won	Championships runner-up
1	Roscrea	1	1	2022	2017
1	Lorrha–Dorrha	1	1	2023	2020
1	Toomevara	1	0	2017	—
1	Burgess	1	0	2018	—
1	J. K. Bracken's	1	0	2019	—
1	Mullinahone	1	0	2020	—
1	Templederry Kenyons	1	0	2021	—
1	Cashel King Cormacs	1	0	2024	—
1	Upperchurch-Drombane	1	0	2025	—
1	St Mary's	1	0	2026	—
11	Carrick Swans	0	2	—	2024, 2025
11	Killenaule	0	2	—	2021, 2026
11	Moycarkey–Borris	0	1	—	2018
11	Holycross–Ballycahill	0	1	—	2019
11	Gortnahoe–Glengoole	0	1	—	2022

== List of finals ==
=== List of Tipperary PIHC finals ===
Year	Winners		Runners-up		Venue	#
Year	Club	Score	Club	Score	Venue	#
2026	St Mary's	0-21	Killenaule	1-15	FBD Semple Stadium	
2025	Upperchurch-Drombane	2-17	Carrick Swans	1-14	FBD Semple Stadium	
2024	Cashel King Cormacs	2-17	Carrick Swans	0-19	FBD Semple Stadium	
2023	Lorrha–Dorrha	2-15, 2-13	Thurles Sarsfields	1-18, 0-18	MacDonagh Park	
2022	Roscrea	1-17	Gortnahoe–Glengoole	0-16	FBD Semple Stadium	
2021	Templederry Kenyons	1-25	Killenaule	1-15	Semple Stadium	
2020	Mullinahone	4-18	Lorrha-Dorrha	2-19	Semple Stadium	
2019	J. K. Bracken's	1-15	Holycross-Ballycahill	0-17	Semple Stadium	
2018	Burgess	1-11	Moycarkey–Borris	0-13	Semple Stadium	
2017	Toomevara	2-18 (1-12)	Roscrea	0-12 (1-12)	St. Flannan's Park	

== See also ==
- Tipperary Senior Hurling Championship
- Tipperary Intermediate Hurling Championship
- Tipperary Junior A Hurling Championship
