= Clonakenny GAA =

Irish athletic club

Clonakenny
- CLG Chluain Uí Chionaoith
- Founded: 1905
- County: Tipperary
- Colours: Black and Amber
- Coordinates: 52°53′11.21″N 7°49′03.56″W

Playing kits
Standard colours

Clonakenny GAA club is located in the parish of Bournea between Roscrea and Templemore and therefore is on the border of the Mid and North Division. Around the time of its foundation in 1905, Clonakenny played in the North division for a few years but for the life time of present club members Clonakenny has played in the Mid Division. Ironically, we won a number of North finals in recent years as part of a combination with Moneygall with whom we have joined forces underage.

The club is one of the smallest rural Clubs in the county drawing on a parish with less than two hundred households. Its scarcity of numbers has meant that the club has mainly played in lower grade competitions at underage level since these grades were introduced. Clonakenny GAA have had their share of success winning county finals in minor and U21 C competitions in both hurling and football over the last twenty odd years. In 1967 Clonakenny defeated Kilsheelin in the County Intermediate (Junior No.1) final. That same group of players also brought the first county junior football title to the parish in 1966. As often happens, a few barren years followed this great team of the 60s. The club did manage to win the Mid No 2 junior hurling final in 1973 and went on to contest three mid intermediate finals in the 1980s without success. Clonakenny were mid Junior B champions in 1995 but were defeated by Toomevara in the county final. Clonakenny competed at Junior A level from 1996 and also were able to field a second team at Junior B level. In 2001 and 2002 the club won the Mid Junior A hurling but failed to capture a county title – the closest they came was when they brought Ballinahinch to a replay in the 2002 County Final. In 2003 the club went Intermediate again and won the Mid Final but Kilruane defeated them in the county semi-final. Clonakenny also won the Mid Junior B football in 2001 and 2005.

Between 2010 and 2013, Clonakenny won four consecutive Mid division titles at the intermediate level, but was eliminated at the county quarter-final or semi-final stage each year. On October 25, 2015, the club's intermediate hurlers defeated Thurles Sarsfields in the County Final at Semple Stadium, marking their first county title in 48 years and resulting in promotion to senior status. Additionally, the club won the County Junior B Football Championship during the same year.

In recent years, Clonakenny have continued to remain competitive with 2 adult teams at Premier Intermediate Level and Junior B level. In 2020, Clonakenny were promoted to Division 1 in the County Hurling League having qualified for the Division 2 final in 2019. Clonakenny won the inaugural Mid Tipperary Premier Intermediate Championship in 2022.

== Achievements ==
- Tipperary Intermediate Hurling Championship: (1) 2015
- Mid Tipperary Intermediate Hurling Championship: (5) 2003, 2010, 2011, 2012, 2013
- Tipperary Junior A Hurling Championship: (1) 1967
- Mid Tipperary Junior A Hurling Championship: (4) 1964, 1967, 2001, 2002
- Mid Tipperary Junior B Hurling Championship: (1) 1995
- Tipperary Junior A Football Championship: (1) 1966
- Mid Tipperary Junior A Football Championship: (1) 1966
- Tipperary Junior B Football Championship: (1) 2015
- Mid Tipperary Junior B Football Championship: (4) 2001, 2005, 2015, 2021
- Tipperary Under-21 C Hurling Championship: (2) 2005, 2007
- Mid Tipperary Under-21 C Hurling Championship: (4) 2001, 2002, 2003, 2004
- Mid Tipperary Under-21 B Football Championship: (3) 2009, 2010, 2012 (with Moneygall)
- Mid Tipperary Under-21 C Football Championship: (2) 2001, 2003
- North Tipperary Minor A Hurling Championship: (1) 2016 (with Moneygall)
- Tipperary Minor B Hurling Championship: (1) 2015 (with Moneygall)
- North Tipperary Minor B Hurling Championship: (1) 2015 (with Moneygall)
- Tipperary Minor C Hurling Championship: (3) 1999, 2005, 2006
- Mid Tipperary Minor C Hurling Championship: (4) 1999, 2001, 2002, 2003
- North Tipperary Minor A Football Championship: (1) 2016 (with Moneygall)
- Tipperary Minor C Football Championship: (1) 2009
- Mid Tipperary Minor C Football Championship: (3) 1999, 2001, 2006
- Mid Tipperary Under 12 D Hurling Championship: (1) 2018
- North Tipperary Feile B Football Championship: (1) 2019 (with Moneygall GAA)
- North Tipperary Under 16 Football Championship: (1) 2019 (with Moneygall GAA)
- North Tipperary Under 21 Football Championship: (1) 2017 (with Moneygall GAA)

=== Notable players ===
- Cian O'Dwyer: Played Celtic challenge for Tipperary (2018) and made his Senior debut for Tipperary in 2023 League campaign. Also a member of the panel for 2023 Championship
- Oisin O'Dwyer: Played primary game football for Tipperary (2018)
- Diarmuid Ryan: Played minor hurling for Tipperary (2016)
- Cain Russell: Played primary game and under 14 football for Tipperary (2014)
- Pa Ryan: Corner Back on Tipperary Minor Hurling Team (2009)
- Willie Ryan: Wing Back on Tipperary Minor Hurling Team (2009), played Intermediate and Senior hurling as well
- Gearóid Byrne: Played Minor Football and U-21 Hurling for Tipperary
- John Costigan: Played minor, intermediate and senior for the county. Former Chairman of the Tipperary GAA County Board
- Paddy Crampton: Won Minor and Intermediate All-Ireland with Tipperary
- Liam Maher: Scored 17 goals and 11 points for Clonakenny in their 6 Championship outings in 1967 operating at full forward. Played intermediate hurling for Tipperary
- Frank Smith: Played Intermediate hurling, junior football and minor football for the county
- Mick Smith: Former Minister for Defence, played intermediate hurling and minor football for Tipperary
- Willie Smith: Played Senior, minor and is holder of an U-21 All-Ireland medal; won two Fitzgibbon Cup medals with UCD
- Jim Treacy: Played intermediate hurling for Tipperary
- Dan Smith: Played minor football for Tipperary

== Facilities ==
In 1981 the club purchased a new 6-acre (2.4 ha) playing field in the townland of Corriga, and the new pitch was opened by the then President of the GAA, Paddy Buggy, on 16 September 1984. Previously Clonakenny teams had trained in a parochial field located in Lismacken. The club's own property in Gurteen, a field which had been secured from the Land Commission at the turn of the century, would have required too much investment to develop but its sale helped to fund the purchase and development of a pitch.

In February 1990 it was decided to add dressing rooms. The club now has excellent facilities for players, and the premises are also used by other organisations such as Foróige and Community Games.

The club has since added a larger Home dressing room with new showers and a kitchen. A club gym has been installed into one of the older dressing rooms. The club has also developed a Ball Wall with astro playing surface and floodlighting.
