= St Mary's GAA (Tipperary) =

Gaelic games club in County Tipperary, Ireland

- Naomh Mhuire Cluain Meala
- Founded: 1929
- County: Tipperary
- Colours: Blue and White
- Grounds: Clonmel Sportsfield
- Coordinates: 52.354268°N 7.713175°W

Playing kits
Standard colours

St Mary's GAA is a senior Gaelic Athletic Association hurling and camogie club. The club is located in the town of Clonmel, County Tipperary in Ireland. It is part of the South Division of Tipperary GAA.

== Honours ==
- Tipperary Premier Intermediate Hurling Championship (1) 2026
- South Tipperary Senior Hurling Championship (2) 1981, 2026
- Tipperary Intermediate Hurling Championship (1) 2017
- South Tipperary Intermediate Hurling Championship (2) 2012, 2014
- Tipperary Junior A Hurling Championship (1) 1975
- South Tipperary Junior B Hurling Championship (2) 2004, 2006
- South Tipperary Under-21 Hurling Championship (6) 1977, 1985, 1986, 1987, 1988, 2016
- Tipperary Minor Hurling Championship (2) 2015, 2016
- Tipperary Under-19 A Hurling Championship (1) 2025
- South Tipperary Under-19 A Hurling Championship (6) 2021, 2022, 2023, 2024, 2025, 2026
- South Tipperary Minor Hurling Championship (19) 1937, 1939, 1950, 1953, 1954, 1957, 1967, 1968, 1974, 1975, 1977, 1980, 1985, 1986, 1987, 1988, 2010, 2012, 2015 , 2020
- South Tipperary Minor B Hurling Championship (2) 2006, 2008

== Notable players ==
- Séamus Kennedy
- Paudie O'Neill
- Peter McGarry
