= Gortnahoe =

Village in County Tipperary, Ireland

Gortnahoe Gort na hUamha Gortnahoo
- Village
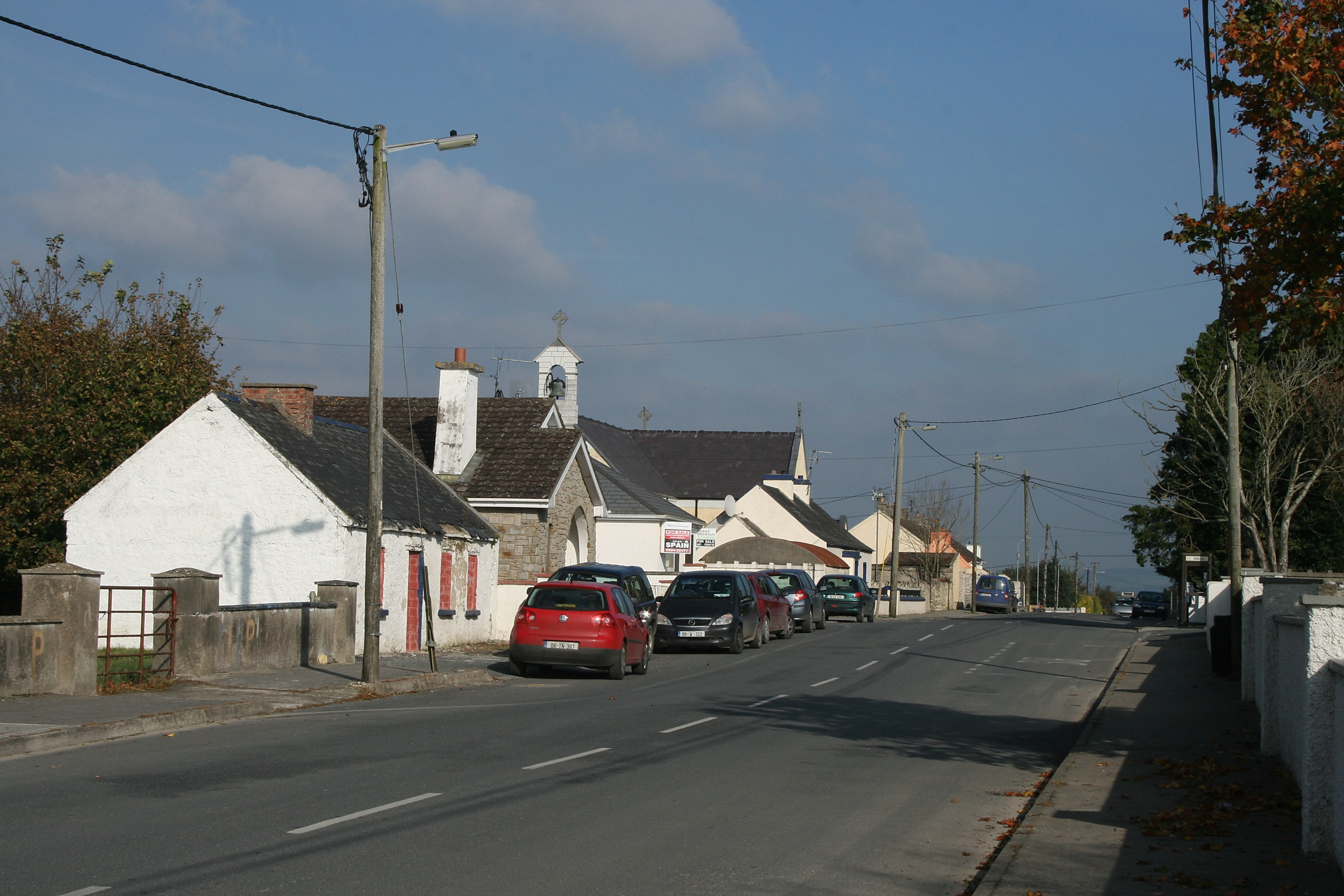
- Gortnahoe's main street, the R689

- Location in Ireland
- Coordinates: 52°40′33″N 7°36′09″W
- Country: Ireland
- Province: Munster
- County: County Tipperary

Population (2016)
  - Total: 286
- Time zone: UTC+0 (WET)
  - Summer (DST): UTC-1 (IST (WEST))

Gortnahoe (Irish: Gort na hUamha, meaning 'field of the cave or souterrain'), also known as Gurtnahoe or Gortnahoo, is a village in County Tipperary, Ireland. It is on the R689 road, 5 km (3.1 mi) south of Urlingford, County Kilkenny, where the N8 Dublin–Cork road can be accessed. Gortnahoe, pronounced "Gurt/na/hoo" by the locals, is part of the Catholic parish of Gortnahoe–Glengoole.

== Etymology ==
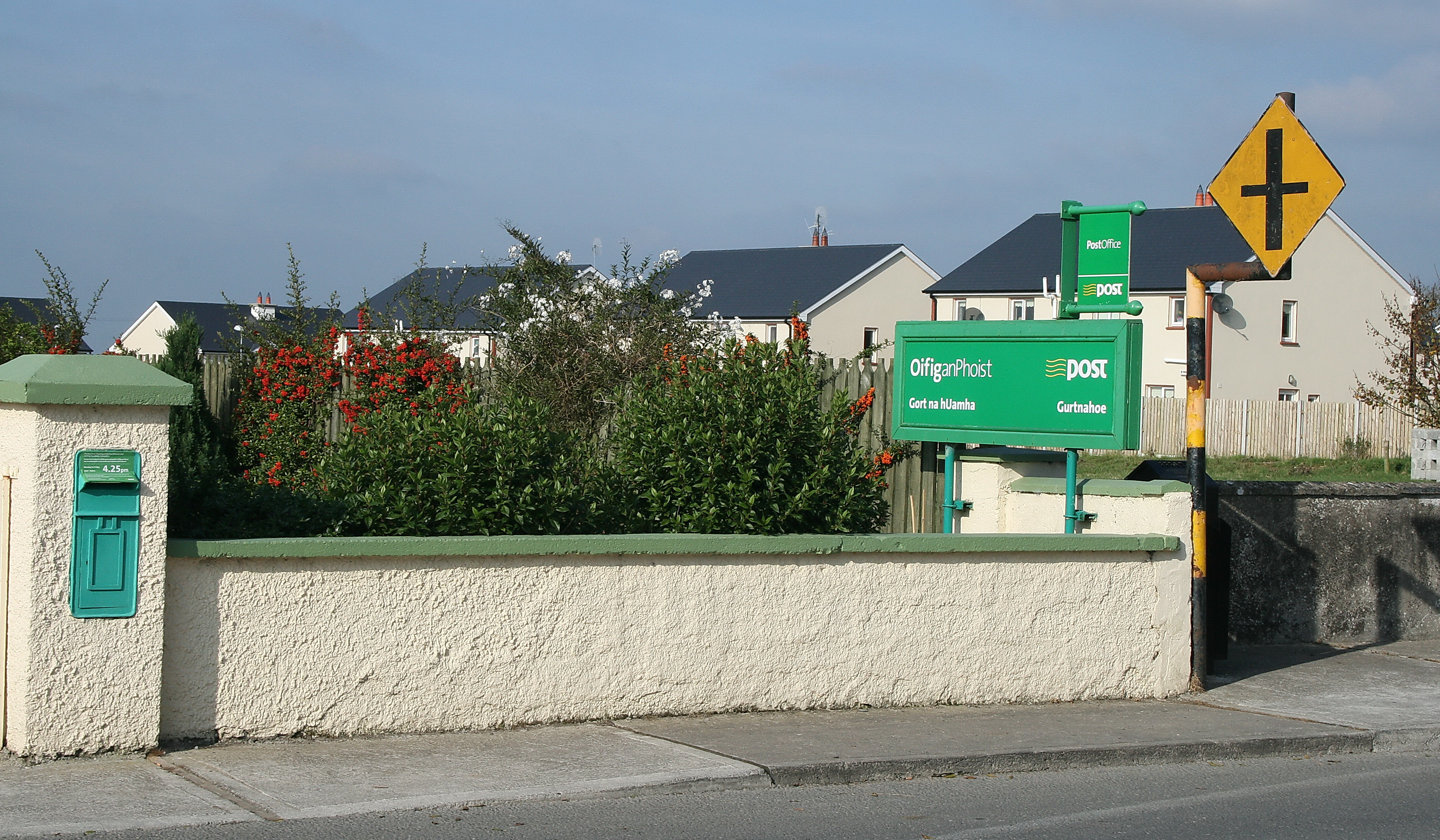
Signage at Gortnahoe (Gurtnahoe) post office

According to the Placenames Database of Ireland, Gortnahoe is derived from the Irish Gort na hUamha, meaning 'ploughed field of the cave'. Other sources note that the name may derive from a souterrain or an underground passage or chamber. Some sources suggest that Gortnahoe derives Gort na hUaighe, meaning the 'ploughed field of the grave', and the local school and GAA team use the Gort na hUaighe variant.

== History ==
=== Buolick tower house, church and cemetery ===
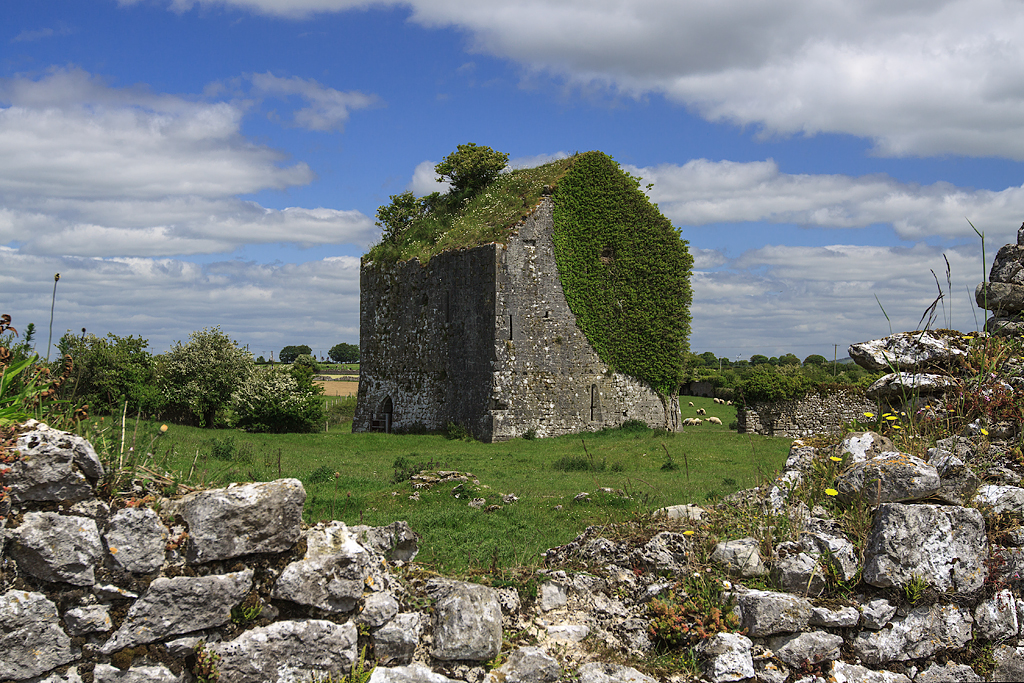
Buolick tower house

Evidence of ancient settlement in the Gortnahoe area includes a number of ringforts, a ringwork and bailey structure, and a medieval church and graveyard.

The latter, in Buolick townland, lies immediately west of a 15th-century castle or tower house. The castle's interior is relatively intact with stairs, murder hole and garderobe structure.

Buolick was a parish as far back as 1291, and the ruined medieval church and graveyard contains a number of medieval tombstones. The church in Buolick also has a residential tower. In the 1890s, two large bells were uncovered on the site. The bells were displayed outside the Archbishop's Palace in Thurles beside the Cathedral of the Assumption. They remained in Thurles until the restoration of Holy Cross Abbey, where they were rehung and remain to this day.

=== Kilcooley Abbey ===
Kilcooley Abbey, approximately 2 km (1.2 mi) to the east of Gortnahoe village is a Cistercian abbey which dates from 1182. With the decline of the Celtic monasteries and the arrival of the Cistercians in Ireland in the 12th century, the monastery of Kilcooley was established by the monks from Jerpoint Abbey in 1184. The monastery continued to prosper until the disestablishment of the monasteries by King Henry VIII in 1539.

The abbey's church has two large carved windows on its east and west side, and its chancel contains two stone tombs and a stone altar. One of these tombs is that of the knight Piers Fitz Oge Butler. His tomb records his death as taking place in 1526 and has some carvings of ten apostles on the side of it carved by Rory O'Tunney. The sacristy is entered through a carved archway that has several carvings, including a scene depicting the crucifixion and a mermaid holding a mirror, which was meant to depict vanity.

The stonework at the ruins of Kilcooley Abbey was undertaken mainly by the O'Tunneys, including the tomb of Pierce Butler of Lismolin (who was descended from John Butler of Clonamicklon) and a number of other headstones. The carved slabs of the crucifixion, the abbot, St. Christopher and the mermaid are also examples of their work.

The ruins of Kilcooley Abbey are now within a large country estate. The Kilcooley Abbey estate was historically associated with the Ponsonby-Barker family. It remained in their ownership until the estate was sold in 2008. While the private manor house and most the lands at Kilcooley are private property, the abbey remains open to the public.

=== Fennor church ===
Fennor, like Kilcooley and Buolick is mentioned in the Papal Taxation lists of 1291. This church is dedicated to the nativity of the Blessed Virgin Mary. When Archbishop James Butler visited the parish in 1752, the church at Fennor does not appear to have been in use.

The ruins in Fennor churchyard include the remains of a Church of Ireland church (dating to 1815), an earlier medieval (Catholic) church and the residence of the priests. A ruined tower house lies to the northeast outside the churchyard.

=== Penal laws and parish consolidation ===
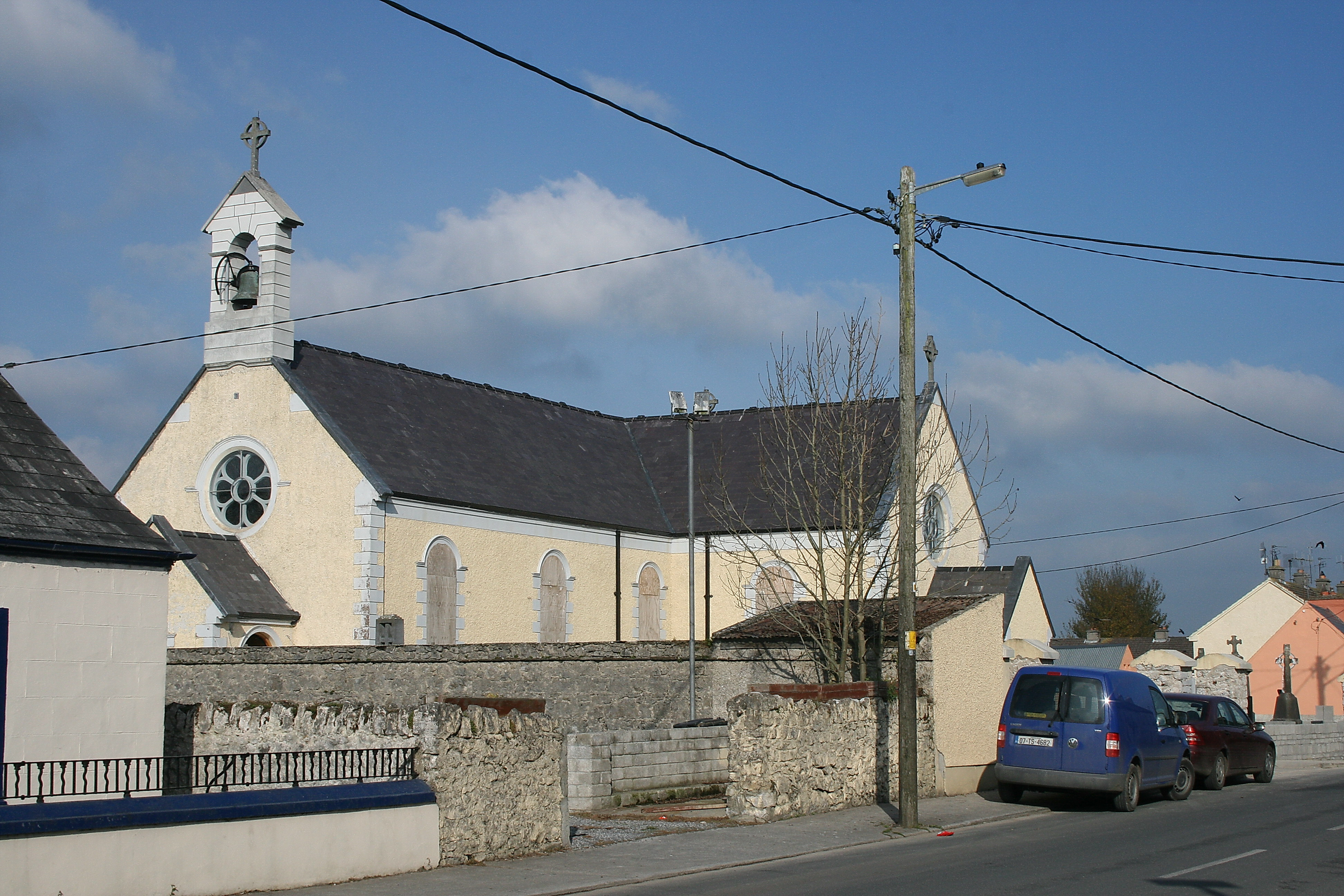
The Catholic church in Gortnahoe village was built in 1820

During the 18th century, the Penal Laws made it difficult for Catholics to practice their religion and priests were scarce throughout Ireland. The outcome was that in 1743 the parishes of Kilcooley, Buolick and Fennor were amalgamated with Urlingford and Graine. The amalgamation continued until Fr. Michael Meighan became parish priest of Gortanhoe and Glengoole in 1805. It was Fr. Michael Meighan who built a new church in Glengoole in 1815. This was replaced on the same site by the present church which was built in 1976. The present Catholic church in Gortnahoe was built in 1820. Dedicated to the Sacred Heart and also built by Fr Michael Meighan, this church underwent renovations in 1923, 1974–75 and in 2008. Skeletal remains, found during the digging of the original foundations of the church, were believed to belong to those who died in a battle in nearby Ballysloe between the Kings of Leinster and Munster. These remains were reburied nearby.

At the time of Catholic Emancipation in the late 1820s, the government launched an enquiry into the provision of education and in that report it is stated that there were twelve schools in the parish, organised and funded in different ways. Nine of them were Catholic schools and three were Protestant schools. Since the 1830s, there have been several amalgamations, leaving three schools in the parish at Gortnahoe, Ballysloe and Glengoole.

=== Palatinate connection ===
In the townlands of New Park and Bawnleigh on the Kilcooley estate, there is a former settlement associated with families who moved from the Palatinate region in Germany. In the 18th century, Sir William Barker, the landlord in Kilcooley, offered property to families who had left the Palatine and settled in Ireland. The Griffith Valuations of 1850 has record of a Methodist chapel and a Baptist chapel in that area. Descendants of those families still farm those areas and remain members of the Church of Ireland parish.

== Amenities and sport ==
The local national (primary) school, Gortnahoe National School, operates under the patronage of the Catholic Archbishop of Cashel and Emly. As of 2025, the national school had an enrollment of 143 pupils. A pre-school (playschool) operates from Gortnahoe's community hall. The village's Catholic church, dedicated to the Sacred Heart, is within the Catholic parish of Gortnahoe and Glengoole and the Archdiocese of Cashel and Emly.

The area's Gaelic Athletic Association (GAA) club, Gortnahoe–Glengoole GAA, was established in its current form in 1961. The club has won a number of divisional and county titles, and won the Tipperary Intermediate Hurling Championship in 2020.

== People ==
- Shane Long, international footballer, is from Gortnahoe.

== See also ==
- List of towns and villages in Ireland
- New Birmingham, a village between Gortnahoe and Glengoole

== Bibliography ==
- Gortnahoe-Glengoole: A Guide, Gortnahoe-Glengoole Committee (Tipperary Star), 1987, OCLC 26758391
