= Templederry Kenyons GAA =

Gaelic games club in County Tipperary, Ireland

Templederry Kenyons
- Teampeall Doire
- Founded: 1887
- County: Tipperary
- Colours: Green and White
- Grounds: Fr Kenyon Park
- Coordinates: 52.801101°N 8.071518°W

Playing kits
Standard colours

Templederry Kenyons GAA is a Tipperary GAA club which is located in County Tipperary, Ireland. Both hurling and Gaelic football are played in the North-Tipperary divisional competitions. The club is centred on the village of Templederry.

== History ==
Templederry affiliated as a club in 1887 with FR J. Frost C.C. and James Coughlan of Latteragh the leading organisers. However, from 1906 to the end of the 1920s the club had very little success. In 1931, a re-united Templederry parish team reached the North Tipperary Intermediate hurling final for the first time and had a comprehensive 7–4 to 3–3 victory over Roscrea. Templederry then went up to Senior but were unable to make the breakthrough and returned to Intermediate ranks in the late 1930s. In 1998, Templederry won its first Juvenile County title, defeating Upperchurch/Drombane in the U12 C Hurling final. The North Junior B league was also won that year at the expense of Borrisokane. In 2008, Templederry won the North and County Intermediate finals at the expense of Newport. 0–17 to 1-10 was the score in the North decider while the county final finished 0–15 to 0–9.

== Honours ==
- Seamus O Riain Cup Winners: 2021
- Tipperary Intermediate Hurling Championship Winners: 2000, 2008
- North Tipperary Intermediate Hurling Championship: 1931, 1979, 2000, 2008
- North Tipperary Junior A Hurling Championship (3) 1970, 1976, 1977
- Tipperary Junior B Hurling Championship (2) 1996, 2009
- North Tipperary Junior B Hurling Championship (4) 1996, 2002, 2009, 2013
- North Tipperary Junior B Football Championship (1) 2008
- North Tipperary Under-21 A Hurling Championship (2) 1977, 2008
- Tipperary Under-21 B Hurling Championship (2) 2001, 2005
- North Tipperary Under-21 B Hurling Championship (5) 1984, 2001, 2005, 2007, 2016 (with Ballinahinch)
- North Tipperary Minor A Hurling Championship (1) 1933
- Tipperary Minor B Hurling Championship (3) 1996, 2000, 2001
- North Tipperary Minor B Hurling Championship (3) 1996, 2000, 2001

== Notable players ==
- Adrian Ryan
- Gearóid Ryan
- Micheál Ryan
- Thomas Stapleton
