= Gortnahoe–Glengoole GAA =

Gaelic sports club in County Tipperary, Ireland

- CLG Gort na hUamha–Gleann an Ghuail
- Founded: 1886
- County: Tipperary
- Colours: Red and white
- Grounds: Gortnahoe

Playing kits
Standard colours

Gortnahoe–Glengoole GAA (Irish: CLG Gort na hUamha-Gleann an Ghuail) is a Gaelic Athletic Association club located in the parish of Gortnahoe–Glengoole in County Tipperary, Ireland, on the border with County Kilkenny. It competes in hurling and Gaelic football in the Mid-Tipperary division of Tipperary GAA. The club was founded in 1886 and owned by Daniel Moore of Moyne-Templetuohy

== Hurling ==
=== Honours ===
- Tipperary Intermediate Hurling Championship (2): 1988, 2020
- Mid-Tipperary Intermediate Hurling Championship (7): 1988, 1999, 2000, 2006, 2008, 2009, 2017;
- Mid-Tipperary Junior A Hurling Championship (7): 1955 (Gortnahoe), 1959 (Gortnahoe), 1968, 1972, 1973, 1983, 1986
- Mid-Tipperary Junior B Hurling Championship: (3): 2006, 2015, 2020
- Mid Tipperary Under-21 A Hurling Championship: (2): 1985 (as Moyne-Gortnahoe), 1991
- Mid Tipperary Under-21 B Hurling Championship: (5): 1987, 2000, 2004, 2016, 2019
- Tipperary Under-21 B Hurling Championship: (2): 2016, 2019
- Tipperary Minor 'B' Hurling Championship (3): 1986, 1994, 2024

== Gaelic football ==
=== Honours ===
- Mid Tipperary Junior A Football Championship: (1): 2016
- Tipperary Junior B Football Championship: (2): 1996, 2014
- Mid Tipperary Junior B Football Championship: (5): 1993, 1996, 2002, 2011, 2014
- Mid Tipperary Under-21 B Football Championship: (2): 1989, 2003
- Mid Tipperary Minor A Football Championship: (1): 2003
- Mid Tipperary Minor C Football Championship: (1): 2003

== Camogie ==
St Patrick's Camogie Club was founded in 1964 when Glengoole amalgamated with Ballingarry. They went on to win two All-Ireland and three county championships and supplied six of the 12 players on the Tipperary team for the 1965 All-Ireland final.

Following victory in 1966, the club disbanded and the players returned to their original clubs.

=== Honours ===
- All-Ireland Senior Club Camogie Championship (2): 1965, 1966
- Tipperary Senior Camogie Championship (3): 1964, 1965, 1966

== Notable players ==
- Jack Dunne, All-Ireland medalist in 1887
- Pat Fizgerald, Tipperary hurler
- Larry Kiely, Tipperary hurler 1960s and Olympic showjumper
- Pat Leahy, Tipperary hurler, 1887
- Shane Long, member of the Republic of Ireland national football team
- Johnny Moriarty, Kilkenny hurler
