= List of Tipperary Senior Hurling Championship winners =

This is a list of all teams and players who have won the Tipperary Senior Hurling Championship since its inception in 1887.

== By team ==
	Team	Winner	Winning Years	Runners-up	Years Runners-up
1	Thurles Sarsfields	36	1887, 1904, 1906, 1907, 1908, 1909, 1911, 1929, 1935, 1936, 1938, 1939, 1942, 1944, 1945, 1946, 1952, 1955, 1956, 1957, 1958, 1959, 1961, 1962, 1963, 1964, 1965, 1974, 2005, 2009, 2010, 2012, 2014, 2015, 2016, 2017	12	1894, 1960, 1968, 1970, 1979, 1992, 2000, 2001, 2002, 2003, 2008, 2021
2	Toomevara	21	1890, 1910, 1912, 1913, 1914, 1919, 1923, 1930, 1931, 1960, 1992, 1993, 1994, 1998, 1999, 2000, 2001, 2003, 2004, 2006, 2008	10	1889, 1911, 1916, 1917, 1918, 1925, 1929, 1958, 1961, 1996
3	Moycarkey-Borris	12	1899, 1900, 1903, 1905, 1926, 1932, 1933, 1934, 1937, 1940, 1982, 1984	3	1931, 1943, 1962
4	Boherlahan-Dualla	11	1915, 1916, 1917, 1918, 1922, 1924, 1925, 1927, 1928, 1941, 1996	4	1914, 1930, 1953, 1995
5	Borris-Ileigh	7	1949, 1950, 1953, 1981, 1983, 1986, 2019	7	1947, 1952, 1955, 1972, 1977, 1988, 2017
6	Roscrea	6	1968, 1969, 1970, 1972, 1973, 1980	11	1936, 1945, 1954, 1963, 1967, 1971, 1976, 1978, 1981, 1982, 1985
7	Clonoulty-Rossmore	4	1888, 1989, 1997, 2018	6	1927, 1928, 1951, 1998, 2010, 2011
7	Holycross-Ballycahill	4	1948, 1951, 1954, 1990	3	1964, 1989, 1991
7	Kilruane MacDonaghs	4	1901 (De Wets)1977, 1978, 1979, 1985	11	1901, 1903, 1904, 1906, 1907 (De Wets),1944, 1959, 1973, 1975, 1980, 1986
7	Loughmore-Castleiney	4	1988, 2007, 2013, 2021	4	1983, 1987, 2014, 2020
11	Tubberadora	3	1895, 1896, 1898	4	1888, 1914, 1926, 1930
12	Carrick Davins	2	1966, 1967	3	1902, 1965, 1969
12	Moneygall	2	1975, 1976	0	
14	Upperchurch-Drombane	1	1894	0	
14	Suir View	1	1897	2	1895, 1896
14	Horse and Jockey	1	1899	2	1897, 1898
14	Ballytrasna	1	1901	0	
14	Éire Óg Annacarthy	1	1943	2	1941, 2004
14	Carrick Swans	1	1947	3	1935, 1946, 1950
14	Moyne-Templetuohy	1	1971	0	
14	Cappawhite	1	1987	0	
14	Cashel King Cormacs	1	1991	4	1939, 1940, 1990, 1994
14	Nenagh Éire Óg	1	1995	6	1993, 1999, 2006, 2013, 2015, 2018
14	Mullinahone	1	2002	1	1997
14	Drom-Inch	1	2011	4	2005, 2007, 2009, 2012
14	Kiladangan	1	2020	2	2016, 2019
26	Lorrha	0		5	1905, 1948, 1956, 1966, 1984
26	Mid Selection	0		2	1919, 1924
26	Killenaule	0		2	1932, 1942
26	Racecourse	0		1	1910
26	Tipperary O'Leary's	0		1	1912
26	North Tipperary	0		1	1887
26	Kilmoyler	0		1	1923
26	Glengoole	0		1	1908
26	Kickhams	0		1	1949
26	Na Piarsaigh	0		1	1957
26	Silvermines	0		1	1974
