= 2011 Tipperary Senior Hurling Championship =

Annual hurling competition season

- Dates: 17 July 2011 – 7 April 2012
- Teams: 32
- Champions: Drom & Inch (1st title); Séamus Callanan (captain); Teddy Kennedy (manager)
- Runners-up: Clonoulty-Rossmore; John Devane (captain); T. J. Ryan (manager)
- Relegated: Ballybacon–Grange

Tournament statistics
- Matches played: 33
- Goals scored: 80 (2.42 per match)
- Points scored: 1013 (30.7 per match)
- Top scorer(s): Pa Bourke (3–37)

The 2011 Tipperary Senior Hurling Championship was the 120th staging of the Tipperary Senior Hurling Championship since its establishment by the Tipperary County Board in 1887. The championship ran from 17 July 2011 to 7 April 2012.

Thurles Sarsfields were the defending champions, however, they were beaten by Clonoulty–Rossmore in the semi-finals.

The final was played on 16 October 2011 at Semple Stadium in Thurles, between Drom & Inch and Clonoulty–Rossmore, in what was their first ever meeting in the final. Drom & Inch won the match by 1–19 to 2–14 to claim their first championship title.

Pa Bourke was the championship's top scorer with 3–37.

== Results ==
=== First round ===
This round featured the 16 teams who failed to qualify for their divisional semi-finalist.

17 July 2011 First round	Lorrha	3-15 - 1-09	Cashel King Cormacs	Páirc Shíleáin
	J Maher 1-3, R Maher 1-3, K Maher 1-1, P Maher 0-4, M Cleary 0-3, T Nevin 0-1.		L Burke 1-1, P Taylor 0-3, J Grogan 0-3, M Coleman 0-1, S Delaney 0-1.

17 July 2011 First round	Borris–Ileigh	0-13 - 0-08	Ballingarry	Páirc Shíleáin
	D O'Connor 0-7, B Harkin 0-2, D McCormack 0-2, P Rabbitte 0-1, M Bourke 0-1.		P Ivors 0-6, I Ivors 0-1, A Cleere 0-1.

17 July 2011 First round	Burgess	2-15 - 0-13	Moycarkey–Borris	The Ragg
	S Murray 2-10, T Scroope 0-2, E Hogan 0-1, D O'Brien 0-1, E Hogan 0-1.		K Morris 0-11, P Kelly 0-1, W Dempsey 0-1.

17 July 2011 First round	Upperchurch–Drombane	2-18 - 1-13	Moneygall	The Ragg
	P Shortt 0-9, M Ryan 1-2, E Shortt 1-2, P Ryan 0-2, C Ryan 0-1, P Greene 0-1, C Stapleton 0-1.		W Greene 0-9, P Fanning 1-0, B McCormack 0-2, G Kirwan 0-1, T Deveraux 0-1.

23 July 2011 First round	Roscrea	3-19 - 0-12	Boherlahan–Dualla	The Ragg
	D Flynn 0-9, J Fitzpatrick 1-3, J Carroll 1-1, T Fitzgerald 1-1, P Carroll 0-2, J Bergin 0-1, L England 0-1, D Buckley 0-1.		D Hickey 0-7, J Ryan 0-2, D Hickey 0-2, A Maher 0-1.

23 July 2011 First round	Thurles Sarsfields	6-21 - 1-12	Knockavilla–Donaskeigh Kickhams	The Ragg
	P Bourke 1-6, R Ruth 2-2, G O'Grady 1-3, L Corbett 1-2, J Lalwor 1-0, S Lillis 0-2, D Kennedy 0-2, D Maher 0-2, J Maher 0-1, J Enright 0-1.		J Ryan 1-7, N Hayes 0-1, B Horgan 0-1, D Butler 0-1, S Morrissey 0-1, P Slattery 0-1.

24 July 2011 First round	Kilruane MacDonaghs	1-20 - 1-13	Borrisokane	St Flannan's Park
	R McLoughney 0-11, L Gibson 1-1, B O'Meara 0-3, S Quinlan 0-2, M O'Leary 0-1, T Cleary 0-1, J Cahill 0-1.		C Larkin 0-9, T Slevin 1-2, P Austin 0-1, C Dooley 0-1.

24 July 2011 First round	Portroe	4-27 - 1-17	Ballybacon–Grange	Páirc Ciocaim
	M Sheedy 1-8, M Gennery 2-4, J Sheedy 0-8, J Ryan 0-4, A McCloskey 1-0, M Creamer 0-1, S O'Brien 0-1, D Gleeson 0-1.		J English 1-9, B Hewitt 0-2, P Hally 0-1, A Cowan 0-1, P Murphy 0-1, N Fitzgerald 0-1, D O'Regan 0-1, B Cummins 0-1.

=== Second round ===
This round featured the eight first round winners and the eight losing divisional semi-finalists.

29 July 2011 Second round	Templederry Kenyons	0-16 - 0-14	Lorrha	MacDonagh Park
	É Murray 0-5, G Ryan 0-3, P O'Leary 0-2, T Minogue 0-2, A Ryan 0-2, P Ryan 0-1, T Ryan 0-1.		C Haugh 0-5, P Maher 0-4, N Hogan 0-1, C Hogan 0-1, M Cleary 0-1, K Maher 0-1, J Maher 0-1.

30 July 2011 Second round	Burgess	1-21 - 0-17	Killenaule	The Ragg
	S Murray 0-10, E Hogan 1-2, D O'Brien 0-3, T Scroope 0-3, T Hogan 0-1, N Gleeson 0-1, J Ryan 0-1.		John O'Dwyer 0-7, D Shelly 0-4, P Kerwick 0-3, Joe O'Dwyer 0-2, D Ryan 0-1, N O'Dwyer 0-1.

30 July 2011 Second round	Borris–Ileigh	0-28 - 2-14 (aet)	Kilruane MacDonaghs	Dolla Grounds
	D O'Connor 0-11, B Maher 0-7, A Cowan 0-3, D McCormack 0-2, P Stapleton 0-1, M Burke 0-1, K Ryan 0-1, D Maher 0-1, P Rabbitte 0-1.		R McLoughney 1-8, L Gibson 1-1, B O'Meara 0-3, S Quinlan 0-1, E Hogan 0-1.

30 July 2011 Second round	Thurles Sarsfields	1-21 - 0-07	Golden–Kilfeacle	St Michael's Park
	P Bourke 0-7, R Ruth 1-4, M Gleeson 0-3, G O'Grady 0-3, S Lillis 0-2, D Kennedy 0-1, J Enright 0-1.		P Ivers 0-3, M Harding 0-3, S Stapleton 0-1.

30 July 2011 Second round	Éire Óg Annacarty	1-18 - 0-15	Roscrea	The Ragg
	R O'Brien 0-7, P O'Dwyer 0-4, D O'Brien 0-4, K Fox 1-0, C O'Brien 0-2, J Furlong 0-1.		D Flynn 0-12, P Carroll 0-2, L England 0-1.

31 July 2011 Second round	Nenagh Éire Óg	3-13 - 2-08	Holycross–Ballycahill	Páirc Shíleáin
	P Murphy 1-2, K Tucker 0-4, M Heffernan 1-1, P Morris 1-0, P Ryan 0-1, S Maher 0-1, N Moloney 0-1, E Tucker 0-1, T Heffernan 0-1.		L Dwan 1-4, D Ferncombe 1-0, R Stakelum 0-2, L McCullagh 0-1, J Dunne 0-1.

31 July 2011 Second round	Upperchurch–Drombane	0-19 - 0-15	Portroe	Páirc Shíleáin
	P Ryan 0-6, J Barry 0-4, M Ryan 0-3, P Shortt 0-3, O Shortt 0-2, M Greene 0-1.		J Sheedy 0-6, M Sheedy 0-3, S O'Brien 0-3, M Gennery 0-1, M Creamer 0-1, D Gleeson 0-1.

10 September 2011 Second round	JK Brackens	1-18 - 1-11	Carrick Davins	Leahy Park
	S Scully 0-9, S Bourke 0-5, K Mulryan 1-0, E Fitzpatrick 0-3, C Scully 0-1.		S Butler 0-6, P Dooley 1-1, M Cronin 0-2, I O'Dwyer 0-1, P Harris 0-1.

=== Third round ===
This round featured the eight second round winners in a playoff of four games.

11 September 2011 Third round	Nenagh Éire Óg	2-16 - 1-12	Éire Óg Annacarty	The Ragg
	M Heffernan 0-11, P Murphy 1-1, C Moloney 1-0, P Ryan 0-2, S Maher 0-1, T Heffernan 0-1.		R O'Brien 0-5, P O'Dwyer 0-3, D O'Dwyer 1-0, C O'Brien 0-2, B Fox 0-1, D O'Brien 0-1.

11 September 2011 Third round	Thurles Sarsfields	4-20 - 0-15	Upperchurch–Drombane	The Ragg
	R Ruth 1-6, P Bourke 1-6, L Corbett 2-1, D Maher 0-2, M Gleeson 0-2, A Kennedy 0-1, M O'Brien 0-1.		P Shortt 0-9, P Greene 0-3, J Barry 0-2, C Stapleton 0-1.

11 September 2011 Third round	Burgess	2-11 - 1-11	Templederry Kenyons	MacDonagh Park
	D Maher 1-4, S Murray 0-4, E Hogan 1-0, T Hogan 0-2, T Scroope 0-1.		É Murray 0-6, C Coughlan 1-0, A Ryan 0-2, P Ryan 0-1, T Minogue 0-1, P O'Leary 0-1.

14 September 2011 Third round	Borris–Ileigh	2-09 - 0-12	JK Brackens	Semple Stadium
	B Maher 0-3, K Ryan 1-0, P Rabbitte 1-0, M Bourke 0-2, D O'Connor 0-2, D McCormack 0-1, M Maher 0-1.		S Scully 0-8, S Bourke 0-2, E Fitzpatrick 0-1, A Doyle 0-1.

=== Fourth round ===
This round featured the four third round winners and the four divisional final losers in a playoff of four games.

17 September 2011 Fourth round	Drom & Inch	2-16 - 1-18	Burgess	Páirc Shíleáin
	S Callanan 0-10, D Butler 1-3, S Butler 1-1, D Ryan 0-1, D Collins 0-1.		S Murray 1-9, T Scroope 0-2, D Maher 0-2, E Hogan 0-2, M O'Flaherty 0-1, N Gleeson 0-1, S Maher 0-1.

17 September 2011 Fourth round	Thurles Sarsfields	2-20 - 1-15	Kildangan	Páirc Shíleáin
	P Bourke 0-8, R Ruth 2-2, L Corbett 0-4, A McCormack 0-3, M Gleeson 0-1, M O'Brien 0-1, A Kennedy 0-1.		R Gleeson 0-5, E Gleeson 1-2, D Egan 0-3, S Kelly 0-2, T Gallagher 0-2, J Gallagher 0-1.

17 September 2011 Fourth round	Nenagh Éire Óg	1-17 - 0-14	Cappawhite	Lacken Park
	M Heffernan 1-7, T Heffernan 0-5, P Murphy 0-1, S Maher 0-1, C Moloney 0-1, P Morris 0-1, R Flannery 0-1.		J O'Neill 0-9, S Ryan 0-3, J Ryan 0-1, N Hayes 0-1.

19 September 2011 Fourth round	Borris–Ileigh	0-17 - 1-09	Carrick Swans	Semple Stadium
	D O'Connor 0-7, B Maher 0-5, M Bourke 0-4, D McCormack 0-1.		D O'Hanlon 1-5, P Diffily 0-2, S Hahessy 0-1, K Reade 0-1.

=== Relegation playoffs ===
This round featured the four teams that lost in the quarter-finals of the Séamus Ó Riain Cup in a playoff of three games.

11 September 2011 Semi-final	Ballingarry	3-13 - 1-09	Borrisokane	St Michael's Park
	P Ivors 1-8, M Ivors 1-2, S Cahill 1-0, I Ivors 0-1, A Cleere 0-1, L Cahill 0-1.		C Larkin 1-2, S Dooley 0-3, B Davis 0-2, G McMahon 0-1, G Harding 0-1.

25 September 2011 Semi-final	Ballybacon–Grange	3-19 - 3-17 (void)	Cashel King Cormacs	Cahir Grounds

5 February 2011 Semi-final refixture	Ballybacon–Grange	0-08 - 0-14	Cashel King Cormacs	Clonmel GAA Ground
	J English 0-4, T Kirwan 0-1, B Hewitt 0-1, D O'Regan 0-1, M Ryan 0-1.		J Grogan 0-6, D Fitzelle 0-4, S Delaney 0-1, E Walsh 0-1, A Cummins 0-1, M Coleman 0-1.

7 April 2011 Final	Borrisokane	w/o- scr.	Ballybacon–Grange	Páirc Shíleáin

=== Quarter-finals ===
This round featured the four fourth round winners and the four divisional final winners in a playoff of four games.

24 September 2011 Quarter-final	Clonoulty–Rossmore	3-18 - 0-14	Nenagh Éire Óg	Semple Stadium
	J O'Neill 2-3, S Maher 1-4, P White 0-5, T Hammersley 0-4, F O'Keeffe 0-2.		M Heffernan 0-7, P Ryan 0-3, P Murphy 0-2, T Heffernan 0-1, M Tuite 0-1.

24 September 2011 Quarter-final	Thurles Sarsfields	3-17 - 2-16	Loughmore–Castleiney	Semple Stadium
	P Bourke 1-6, R Ruth 0-3, L Corbett 1-0, D Maher 1-0, G O'Grady 0-2, S Lillis 0-2, A McCormack 0-2, A Kennedy 0-1, M O'Brien 0-1.		L McGrath 0-7, N McGrath 1-4, M Webster 1-0, T King 0-2, A McGrath 0-2, E Sweeney 0-1.

25 September 2011 Quarter-final	Drom & Inch	1-23 - 1-13	Toomevara	Semple Stadium
	S Callanan 0-12, D Butler 1-3, J Woodlock 0-4, K Butler 0-1, S Butler 0-1, P Kennedy 0-1, M Ryan 0-1.		K Dunne 0-5, W Ryan 1-0, B Duff 0-2, F Devaney 0-2, D Young 0-1, B McCormack 0-1, P Grace 0-1, P O'Brien 0-1.

25 September 2011 Quarter-final	Mullinahone	2-21 - 0-21 (aet)	Borris–Ileigh	Semple Stadium
	E Kelly 2-13, P Kelly 0-3, E O'Meara 0-2, C Horan 0-1, N Curran 0-1, S Curran 0-1.		B Maher 0-4, D O'Connor 0-4, D McCormack 0-3, B Harkin 0-2, J Ryan 0-2, K Ryan 0-1, M Bourke 0-1, P Stapleton 0-1, C Cowan 0-1, D Maher 0-1, T Kavanagh 0-1.

=== Semi-finals ===
2 October 2011 Semi-final	Drom & Inch	1-20 - 0-14	Mullinahone	Semple Stadium
	S Callanan 1-5, J Ryan 0-5, S Butler 0-3, D Butler 0-2, J Woodlock 0-2, D Collins 0-2, J Ryan 0-1.		E Kelly 0-10, S Curran 0-2, C Horan 0-1, P Kelly 0-1.

2 October 2011 Semi-final	Clonoulty–Rossmore	2-14 - 0-15	Thurles Sarsfields	Semple Stadium
	T Hammersley 1-8, C Quirke 1-0, J Moloney 0-1, S Maher 0-1, C Ryan 0-1, J O'Neill 0-1, T Butler 0-1, M Sadlier 0-1.		P Bourke 0-4, D Maher 0-3, A Kennedy 0-1, R Ruth 0-1, A McCormack 0-1, M Gleesn 0-1, M O'Brien 0-1, J Enright 0-1, D Kennedy 0-1, J Maher 0-1.

=== Final ===
16 October 2011 Final	Drom & Inch	1-19 - 2-14	Clonoulty–Rossmore	Semple Stadium
	S Callanan 0-6 (0-2 fs, 0-1 65); P Lupton 1-2; D Butler 0-4; D Collins 0-3; S Butler, J Ryan (0-1f) 0-2 each.	Report	T Hammersley 0-6 (0-3 fs, 0-1 65); J O’Neill (0-1 sideline) S Maher 1-2 each; C Ryan 0-2; J Moloney, T Butler 0-1 each.

== Championship statistics ==
=== Top scorers ===
Rank	Player	Club	Tally	Total	Matches	Average
1	Pa Bourke	Thurles Sarsfields	3-37	46	6	7.66
2	Stephen Murray	Burgess	3-33	42	4	10.50
3	Richie Ruth	Thurles Sarsfields	6-18	36	6	9.00
4	Séamus Callanan	Drom & Inch	1-33	36	4	9.00
5	Michael Heffernan	Nenagh Éire Óg	2-26	32	4	8.00
6	David O'Connor	Borris–Ileigh	0-31	31	4	7.75
7	Eoin Kelly	Mullinahone	2-23	29	2	14.50
8	Ray McLoughney	Kilruane MacDonaghs	1-19	22	2	11.00
9	Timmy Hammersley	Clonoulty–Rossmore	1-18	21	3	7.00
9	Pat Shortt	Upperchurch–Drombane	0-21	21	3	7.00
9	Davin Flynn	Roscrea	0-21	21	2	10.50

=== Miscellaneous ===
- The relegation playoffs were delayed and postponed due to a series of objections and counter-objections. Ballybacon–Grange beat Cashel King Cormacs after extra time in the semi-final, however, because there was no provision for extra time in the original regulation or in the notification of the game sent to the two clubs and the referee, Cashel King Cormacs lodged an objection. They appealed to the Munster Council when their original appeal was thrown out by the Tipperary County Board. A replay was ordered, however, finding a suitable date for the game proved difficult. Cashel King Cormacs reversed the original result and won the refixture when it was played. Ballybacon–Grange thus qualified for the final against Borrisokane, however, finding a suitable date for that game also proved difficult. The Tipperary County Board relegated Borrisokane, after they failed to fulfil the playoff fixture, however, the successfully appealed this decision to the Munster Council. Ballybacon–Grange were relegated after they failed to fulfil the new fixture.
