= Tipperary Senior Hurling Championship =

Annual hurling competition

- Current season or competition: 2026 Tipperary Senior Hurling Championship
- Code: Hurling
- Founded: 1887; 139 years ago
- Region: Tipperary (GAA)
- Trophy: Dan Breen Cup
- No. of teams: 16
- Title holders: Thurles Sarsfields (37th title)
- Most titles: Thurles Sarsfields (37 titles)
- Sponsors: FBD Insurance
- TV partner: TG4
- Official website: Official website

The Tipperary Senior Hurling Championship (known for sponsorship reasons as the FBD Insurance Tipperary County Senior Hurling Championship) is an annual hurling competition organised by the Tipperary County Board of the Gaelic Athletic Association since 1887 for the top hurling teams in the county of Tipperary in Ireland.

The series of games are played during the summer and autumn months with the county final currently being played at Semple Stadium in October. The prize for the winning team is the Dan Breen Cup. Initially played as a knock-out competition on a divisional basis, the championship currently features a group stage followed by a knock-out stage.

The Tipperary County Championship is an integral part of the wider Munster Senior Club Hurling Championship. The winners of the Tipperary county final join the champions of the other four hurling counties to contest the provincial championship.

16 teams currently participate in the Tipperary County Championship. The title has been won at least once by 25 different teams. The all-time record-holders are Thurles Sarsfields, who have won a total of 37 titles.

The 2026 Tipperary Senior Hurling Championship was won by Thurles Sarsfields for the sixth time in their history after they defeated Moycarkey–Borris in the final by 2-22 to 1-22.

== History ==
=== Beginnings ===
Following the foundation of the Gaelic Athletic Association (GAA) in 1884, new rules for Gaelic football and hurling were drawn up and published in the United Irishman newspaper. County committees were quickly established, with the Tipperary County Board affiliating in 1886. Over the course of the following year, 130 clubs registered with the GAA in Tipperary, making it the strongest county in the country. After difficulties in organising the early championships, the title has been awarded every year except on one occasion since 1894. Civil unrest at the height of the War of Independence resulted in the 1920 championship being cancelled.

=== Team dominance ===
Since the beginning, the championship has seen periods of dominance by various teams. Tubberadora became the preeminent team of the first decade, before being superseded by Thurles Sarsfields. After winning the inaugural title in 1887, the Thurles-based club won six championships from a possible nine between 1904 and 1911. Toomevara made their first big breakthrough in 1910 and won titles at regular intervals over the course of the next twenty years. Boherlahen-Dualla won the first of four successive championship titles in 1915 and won a grand total of ten up to and including the 1941 championship. Thurles Sarsfields bounced back in 1929 after an eleven-year period in the doldrums. Over the course of the next 45 years the club established itself as the standard bearer of club hurling in Tipperary by winning 21 titles during this period. The club reached its peak by winning ten titles in eleven championship seasons between 1955 and 1965. Roscrea won their first championship in 1968 before completing a three-in-a-row in 1970. The club won further titles in 1972, 1973 and 1980. Moneygall and Kilruane MacDonagh's shared five titles between 1975 and 1979, while Borris-Ileigh won three titles throughout the 1980s. After failing to win a championship in over thirty years, Toomevara returned to the top table in 1992. Over the course of the next sixteen years the club claimed 11 championship titles. Thurles Sarsfields also returned to their winning ways after a 31-year barren spell by claiming the 2005 championship. They have since become the most successful team of the 21st century by winning nine championships.

== Format ==
The Tipperary senior hurling championship was among the most complicated system in Ireland as it has striven to accommodate from 25 to 32 teams. A knockout divisional system and group backdoor system was used to accommodate these teams. The county championship was run on a divisional basis with teams in the divisional finals going into the county quarter-finals and proceeding from there.

A new format was introduced in 2014, with the county championship divided into two sections of 16 teams each, nowadays called Senior and Premier Intermediate Championship. Each section is divided into four groups of four teams with games played on a round robin basis. Originally teams from both sections could qualify for the knockout stages, as do the four divisional champions. Since 2017 only teams from the first section can qualify.

As of 2026 the first placed team of the 4 groups qualifies for the quarter-finals. The second placed face the divisional champions in a preliminary Quarter-final. If the divisional champions are among the top 2 teams, some 2nd placed teams qualify directly for the Quarter-finals. From this stage onward a single-elimination knock-out tournament is played.

The bottom 4 teams face off in a knock-out with the team losing two matches being relegated to the Premier Intermediate Championship.

== Teams ==
=== 2026 teams ===
The 16 teams competing in the 2026 Tipperary Senior Hurling Championship were:

Club	Location	Division	Colours	Position in 2026	In championship since	Championship titles	Last championship title
Borris–Ileigh	Borrisoleigh	North	Maroon and white	Quarter-finals	?	7	2019
Cashel King Cormacs	Cashel	West	Red and Green	Quarter-finals	2025	1	1991
Clonoulty–Rossmore	Clonoulty	West	Green and gold	Relegation semi-final	?	4	2018
Drom & Inch	Bouladuff	Mid	Green and white	Group stage	?	1	2011
Holycross–Ballycahill	Holycross	Mid	Green and white	Quarter-finals	?	4	1990
JK Brackens	Templemore, Clonmore and Killea	Mid	Black and white	Semi-finals	2020	0	—
Kiladangan	Puckane	North	Blue and gold	Quarter-finals	?	2	2023
Kilruane MacDonagh's	Cloughjordan	North	White and black	Group stage	?	6	2022
Loughmore–Castleiney	Loughmore and Castleiney	Mid	Green and red	Preliminary Quarter-finals	?	5	2024
Moycarkey–Borris	Littleton	Mid	Red and gold	Runners-up	?	12	1984
Mullinahone	Mullinahone	South	Green and red	Relegated	2021	1	2002
Nenagh Éire Óg	Nenagh	North	Sky blue and navy blue	Semi-finals	?	1	1995
Roscrea	Roscrea	North	Red and white	Relegation final	2023	6	1980
Thurles Sarsfields	Thurles	Mid	Blue and white	Champions	?	37	2026
Toomevara	Toomevara	North	Green and gold	Group stage	?	21	2008
Upperchurch–Drombane	Upperchurch and Drombane	Mid	Black and amber	Relegation semi-final	2026	1	1894

== Sponsorship ==
For four years between 2013 and 2016, the championship was sponsored by Clean Ireland Recycling. In August 2016, the Tipperary County Board announced that they had signed a three-year sponsorship deal with Tipperary Water. Since 2019 FBD is the official sponsor of the championship.

== Qualification for subsequent competitions ==
The Tipperary Senior Hurling Championship winners qualify for the subsequent Munster Senior Club Hurling Championship. This place is reserved for club teams only as divisional and amalgamated teams are not allowed in the provincial championship.

== Venues ==
=== Early rounds ===
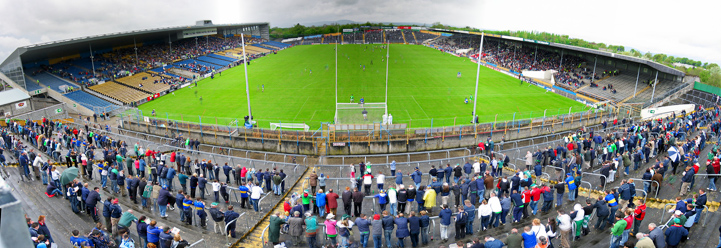
Semple Stadium in Thurles.

Fixtures in the group stage and early knock-out rounds of the championship are usually played at a neutral venue that is deemed halfway between the participating teams. Some of the more common venues include MacDonagh Park, St. Cronan's Park and St. Michael's Park. All games from the quarter-finals onward are played at Semple Stadium.

=== Final ===
The final is usually played at Semple Stadium, previously Thurles Sportsfield.

== Managers ==
Managers in the Tipperary Championship are involved in the day-to-day running of the team, including the training, team selection, and sourcing of players. Their influence varies from club-to-club and is related to the individual club committees. The manager is assisted by a team of two or three selectors and a backroom team consisting of various coaches.

Winning managers (1999–present)
Manager	Team	Wins	Winning years
Tommy Maher	Thurles Sarsfields	4	2014, 2015, 2016, 2017
Michael Gleeson	Thurles Sarsfields	2	2009, 2010
Éamonn Kelly	Loughmore–Castleiney	2	2024, 2025
Tom Ryan	Toomevara	1	1999
Pad Joe Whelehan	Toomevara	1	2000
Seán Stack	Toomevara	1	2001
John Leahy	Mullinahone	1	2002
Michael Connolly	Toomevara	1	2003
Seán Hehir	Toomevara	1	2004
Ger Cunningham	Thurles Sarsfields	1	2005
Pat Herbert	Toomevara	1	2006
Éamonn Sweeney	Loughmore–Castleiney	1	2007
Vincent McKenna	Toomevara	1	2008
Teddy Kennedy	Drom & Inch	1	2011
Séamus Quinn	Thurles Sarsfields	1	2012
Declan Laffan	Loughmore–Castleiney	1	2013
John Devane	Clonoulty–Rossmore	1	2018
Johnny Kelly	Borris–Ileigh	1	2019
Brian Lawlor	Kiladangan	1	2020
Frankie McGrath	Loughmore–Castleiney	1	2021
Liam O'Kelly	Kilruane MacDonaghs	1	2022
John O'Meara	Kiladangan	1	2023
Pádraic Maher	Thurles Sarsfields	1	2026

== Trophy ==
The winning team is presented with the Dan Breen Cup. A native of Donohill, Dan Breen (1894-1969) was a volunteer in the Irish Republican Army during the Irish War of Independence and the Irish Civil War. In later years, he was a Fianna Fáil politician.

== Roll of honour ==
=== By club ===
#	Club	Titles	Runners-up	Championships won	Championships runner-up
1	Thurles Sarsfields	37	13	1887, 1904, 1906, 1907, 1908, 1909, 1911, 1929, 1935, 1936, 1938, 1939, 1942, 1944, 1945, 1946, 1952, 1955, 1956, 1957, 1958, 1959, 1961, 1962, 1963, 1964, 1965, 1974, 2005, 2009, 2010, 2012, 2014, 2015, 2016, 2017, 2026	1894, 1960, 1968, 1970, 1979, 1992, 2000, 2001, 2002, 2003, 2008, 2021, 2023
2	Toomevara	21	11	1890, 1910, 1912, 1913, 1914, 1919, 1923, 1930, 1931, 1960, 1992, 1993, 1994, 1998, 1999, 2000, 2001, 2003, 2004, 2006, 2008	1889, 1911, 1916, 1917, 1918, 1925, 1929, 1958, 1961, 1996, 2024
3	Moycarkey–Borris	12	4	1899, 1900, 1903, 1905, 1926, 1932, 1933, 1934, 1937, 1940, 1982, 1984	1931, 1943, 1962, 2026
4	Boherlahan–Dualla	11	4	1915, 1916, 1917, 1918, 1922, 1924, 1925, 1927, 1928, 1941, 1996	1914, 1930, 1953, 1995
5	Borris–Ileigh	7	7	1949, 1950, 1953, 1981, 1983, 1986, 2019	1947, 1952, 1955, 1972, 1977, 1988, 2017
6	Roscrea	6	11	1968, 1969, 1970, 1972, 1973, 1980	1936, 1945, 1954, 1963, 1967, 1971, 1976, 1978, 1981, 1982, 1985
6	Kilruane MacDonaghs	6	11	1901 (De Wets), 1977, 1978, 1979, 1985, 2022	1901, 1903, 1904, 1906, 1907 (De Wets),1944, 1959, 1973, 1975, 1980, 1986
6	Loughmore–Castleiney	6	4	1988, 2007, 2013, 2021, 2024, 2025	1983, 1987, 2014, 2020
9	Clonoulty–Rossmore	4	6	1888, 1989, 1997, 2018	1927, 1928, 1951, 1998, 2010, 2011
9	Holycross–Ballycahill	4	3	1948, 1951, 1954, 1990	1964, 1989, 1991
11	Tubberadora	3	4	1895, 1896, 1898	
12	Carrick Davins	2	3	1966, 1967	1902, 1965, 1969
12	Kiladangan	2	3	2020, 2023	2016, 2019, 2022
12	Moneygall	2	0	1975, 1976	
15	Upperchurch–Drombane	1	0	1894	
15	Suir View	1	2	1897	1895, 1896
15	Horse and Jockey	1	2	1899	1897, 1898
15	Ballytrasna	1	0	1901	
15	Éire Óg Annacarthy	1	2	1943	1941, 2004
15	Carrick Swans	1	3	1947	1935, 1946, 1950
15	Moyne–Templetuohy	1	0	1971	
15	Cappawhite	1	0	1987	
15	Cashel King Cormacs	1	4	1991	1939, 1940, 1990, 1994
15	Nenagh Éire Óg	1	7	1995	1993, 1999, 2006, 2013, 2015, 2018, 2025
15	Mullinahone	1	1	2002	1997
15	Drom & Inch	1	4	2011	2005, 2007, 2009, 2012
26	Lorrha	0	5		1905, 1948, 1956, 1966, 1984
26	Mid Selection	0	2		1919, 1924
26	Killenaule	0	2		1932, 1942
26	Racecourse	0	1		1910
26	Tipperary O'Leary's	0	1		1912
26	North Tipperary	0	1		1887
26	Kilmoyler	0	1		1923
26	Glengoole	0	1		1908
26	Kickhams	0	1		1949
26	Na Piarsaigh	0	1		1957
26	Silvermines	0	1		1974

== List of finals ==
Year	Winners		Runners-up	
Year	Club	Score	Club	Score
2026	Thurles Sarsfields	1-19	Moycarkey–Borris	1-11
2025	Loughmore–Castleiney	2-22	Nenagh Éire Óg	1-22
2024	Loughmore–Castleiney	2-19	Toomevara	1-17
2023	Kiladangan	1-19, 1-21 (R)	Thurles Sarsfields	0-22, 1-20 (R)
2022	Kilruane MacDonaghs	2-18, 2-20 (R)	Kiladangan	1-21, 1-16 (R)
2021	Loughmore–Castleiney	0-23, 2-14 (R)	Thurles Sarsfields	2-17, 2-13 (R)
2020	Kiladangan	1-28	Loughmore–Castleiney	3-20 A.E.T.
2019	Borris–Ileigh	1-15	Kiladangan	1-12
2018	Clonoulty–Rossmore	0-23	Nenagh Éire Óg	2-13
2017	Thurles Sarsfields	1-24	Borris–Ileigh	0-11
2016	Thurles Sarsfields	0-27	Kiladangan	1-15
2015	Thurles Sarsfields	1-18	Nenagh Éire Óg	3-11
2014	Thurles Sarsfields	2-22	Loughmore–Castleiney	3-11
2013	Loughmore–Castleiney	1-17	Nenagh Éire Óg	1-16
2012	Thurles Sarsfields	1-21	Drom & Inch	2-15
2011	Drom & Inch	1-19	Clonoulty–Rossmore	2-14
2010	Thurles Sarsfields	1-16	Clonoulty–Rossmore	1-07
2009	Thurles Sarsfields	0-14	Drom & Inch	0-05
2008	Toomevara	2-14	Thurles Sarsfields	0-17
2007	Loughmore–Castleiney	0-22	Drom & Inch	0-13
2006	Toomevara	1-21	Nenagh Éire Óg	2-14
2005	Thurles Sarsfields	1-17	Drom & Inch	0-15
2004	Toomevara	4-12	Éire Óg Annacarty/Golden-Kilfeacle	2-12
2003	Toomevara	3-19	Thurles Sarsfields	3-16
2002	Mullinahone	0-14, 2-10 (R)	Thurles Sarsfields	0-14, 1-11 (R)
2001	Toomevara	1-22	Thurles Sarsfields	1-13
2000	Toomevara	2-10	Thurles Sarsfields	0-11
1999	Toomevara	1-17	Nenagh Éire Óg	0-13
1998	Toomevara	0-16	Clonoulty–Rossmore	1-10
1997	Clonoulty–Rossmore	0-17	Mullinahone	1-12
1996	Boherlahan–Dualla	1-16	Toomevara	2-12
1995	Nenagh Éire Óg	2-25	Boherlahan–Dualla	2-08
1994	Toomevara	3-11	Cashel King Cormacs	1-09
1993	Toomevara	1-14	Nenagh Éire Óg	1-13
1992	Toomevara	0-11, 0-12 (R)	Thurles Sarsfields	1-08, 1-06 (R)
1991	Cashel King Cormacs	2-08	Holycross–Ballycahill	1-05
1990	Holycross–Ballycahill	0-13	Cashel King Cormacs	0-10
1989	Clonoulty–Rossmore	1-11	Holycross–Ballycahill	1-09
1988	Loughmore–Castleiney	1-06, 2-07 (R)	Borris–Ileigh	0-09, 1-08 (R)
1987	Cappawhite	1-17	Loughmore–Castleiney	2-13
1986	Borris–Ileigh	0-14	Kilruane MacDonaghs	0-07
1985	Kilruane MacDonaghs	2-11	Roscrea	0-10
1984	Moycarkey–Borris	2-08	Lorrha	0-09
1983	Borris–Ileigh	0-17	Loughmore–Castleiney	1-11
1982	Moycarkey–Borris	3-09, 2-12 (R)	Roscrea	1-15, 0-11 (R)
1981	Borris–Ileigh	1-14	Roscrea	0-12
1980	Roscrea	3-11	Kilruane MacDonaghs	2-13
1979	Kilruane MacDonaghs	2-18	Thurles Sarsfields	3-06
1978	Kilruane MacDonaghs	2-14	Roscrea	2-13
1977	Kilruane MacDonaghs	2-08, 1-05 (R)	Borris–Ileigh	1-11, 0-05 (R)
1976	Moneygall	1-09	Roscrea	2-05
1975	Moneygall	2-11, 3-13 (R)	Kilruane MacDonaghs	2-11, 0-05 (R)
1974	Thurles Sarsfields	3-06	Silvermines	1-10
1973	Roscrea	3-14	Kilruane MacDonaghs	3-08
1972	Roscrea	5-08	Borris–Ileigh	3-06
1971	Moyne–Templetuohy	2-08	Roscrea	0-06
1970	Roscrea	3-11	Thurles Sarsfields	2-12
1969	Roscrea	4-13	Carrick Davins	0-05
1968	Roscrea	2-13	Thurles Sarsfields	3-04
1967	Carrick Davins	2-10	Roscrea	2-07
1966	Carrick Davins	2-12	Lorrha	1-02
1965	Thurles Sarsfields	2-07, 3-11 (R)	Carrick Davins	3-04, 2-07 (R)
1964	Thurles Sarsfields	5-14	Holycross–Ballycahill	1-04
1963	Thurles Sarsfields	4-10	Roscrea	2-10
1962	Thurles Sarsfields	1-07	Moycarkey–Borris	1-06
1961	Thurles Sarsfields	3-04	Toomevara	0-09
1960	Toomevara	3-15	Thurles Sarsfields	2-08
1959	Thurles Sarsfields	3-12	Kilruane MacDonaghs	2-06
1958	Thurles Sarsfields	4-11	Toomevara	3-03
1957	Thurles Sarsfields	4-15	Na Piarsaigh	4-04
1956	Thurles Sarsfields	3-08	Lorrha	1-04
1955	Thurles Sarsfields	4-10	Borris–Ileigh	0-06
1954	Holycross–Ballycahill	6-05	Roscrea	2-03
1953	Borris–Ileigh	4-08	Boherlahan	4-04
1952	Thurles Sarsfields	5-06	Borris–Ileigh	1-08
1951	Holycross–Ballycahill	5-15	Clonoulty	1-04
1950	Borris–Ileigh	2-07	Carrick Swans	2-03
1949	Borris–Ileigh	4-06	Kickhams	2-01
1948	Holycross–Ballycahill	4-10	Lorrha	2-04
1947	Carrick Swans	5-04	Borris-Ileigh	2-02
1946	Thurles Sarsfields	4-05	Carrick Swans	0-03
1945	Thurles Sarsfields	1-04 (R)	Roscrea	1-00 (R)
1944	Thurles Sarsfields	6-03	Kilruane MacDonaghs	1-04
1943	Éire Óg, Annacarty	4-03	Moycarkey–Borris	2-04
1942	Thurles Sarsfields	8-05	Killenaule	0-01
1941	Boherlahan	2-02	Éire Óg, Annacarty	0-06
1940	Moycarkey–Borris	4-07	Cashel King Cormacs	4-02
1939	Thurles Sarsfields	5-03	Cashel King Cormacs	4-02
1938	Thurles Sarsfields	7-07	Kildangan	2-02
1937	Moycarkey–Borris	7-06	Cashel Kings Cormacs	6-02
1936	Thurles Sarsfields	2-10	Roscrea	0-03
1935	Thurles Sarsfields	6-05	Carrick Swans	0-02
1934	Moycarkey–Borris	3-06	Kildangan/Kilbarron	2-03
1933	Moycarkey–Borris	1-07	Borrisokane	1-00
1932	Moycarkey–Borris	7-06	Killenaule	5-01
1931	Toomevara	5-04	Moycarkey–Borris	2-00
1930	Toomevara	5-05, 4-01 (R)	Boherlahan	6-02, 1-00 (R)
1929	Thurles Sarsfields	4-03	Toomevara	1-03
1928	Boherlahan	5-04	Clonoulty	2-02
1927	Boherlahan	4-01	Toomevara	1-01
1926	Moycarkey–Borris	6-04	Boherlahan	4-02
1925	Boherlahan	w/o	Thurles Sarsfields	scr.
1924	Boherlahan	8-03	Moycarkey–Borris	1-00
1923	Toomevara	5-04	Kilmoyler	3-03
1922	Boherlahan	5-01	North Selection (Toomevara)	2-03
1921	Championship not played due to War of Independence			
1920	Championship not played due to War of Independence			
1919	Toomevara	3-00	Mid Selection	1-05
1918	Boherlahan	3-04 (awarded title)	Toomevara	6-00
1917	Boherlahan	2-02	Toomevara	1-01
1916	Boherlahan	2-02	Toomevara	0-00
1915	Boherlahan	4-04	Thurles	1-02
1914	Toomevara	5-02	Boherlahan	3-01
1913	Toomevara	2-03	Cashel	0-00
1912	Toomevara	6-04	Tipperary O'Leary's	0-01
1911	Thurles	4-05	Toomevara	1-00
1910	Toomevara	(won on objection)	Racecourse	
1909	Thurles	10-04	Racecourse/Grangemockler	5-02
1908	Thurles	2-06	Glengoole	4-02
1907	Thurles	3-13	Lahorna De Wets	1-06
1906	Thurles	4-11	Lahorna De Wets	3-06
1905	Two Mile Borris	w/o	Lorrha	scr.
1904	Thurles	5-08	Lahorna De Wets	3-09
1903	Two Mile Borris	w/o	Lahorna De Wets	scr.
1902	Lahorna De Wets	7-10	Carrick	1-02
1901	Ballytarsna	7-11	Lahorna De Wets	0-01
1900	Two Mile Borris	w/o	Moycarkey	scr.
1899	Horse & Jockey	3-06, 3-08 (R)	Two Mile Borris	2-05, 2-04 (R)
1898	Tubberadora	3-07	Horse & Jockey	1-04
1897	Suir View	4-03	Horse & Jockey	2-09
1896	Tubberadora	4-08	Suir View	2-02
1895	Tubberadora	3-09	Suir View	2-07
1894	Drombane	4-04	Thurles	0-00
1893	Not played			
1892	Not played			
1891	Not played			
1890	Toomevara	No records		
1889	Moycarkey	1-03	Toomevara	1-00
1888	Clonoulty	1-01	Boherlahan	0-02
1887	Thurles	0-03	North Tipperary	0-00

== Records and statistics ==
=== Final ===
==== Team ====
- Most wins: 37:
  - Thurles Sarsfields (1887, 1904, 1906, 1907, 1908, 1909, 1911, 1929, 1935, 1936, 1938, 1939, 1942, 1944, 1945, 1946, 1952, 1955, 1956, 1957, 1958, 1959, 1961, 1962, 1963, 1964, 1965, 1974, 2005, 2009, 2010, 2012, 2014, 2015, 2016, 2017, 2026)
- Most consecutive wins: 5:
  - Thurles Sarsfields (1955, 1956, 1957, 1958, 1959)
  - Thurles Sarsfields (1961, 1962, 1963, 1964, 1965)
- Most appearances in a final: 49:
  - Thurles Sarsfields (1887, 1894, 1904, 1906, 1907, 1908, 1909, 1911, 1929, 1935, 1936, 1938, 1939, 1942, 1944, 1945, 1946, 1952, 1955, 1956, 1957, 1958, 1959, 1960, 1961, 1962, 1963, 1964, 1965, 1968, 1970, 1979, 1992, 2000, 2001, 2002, 2003, 1974, 2005, 2009, 2010, 2012, 2014, 2015, 2016, 2017, 2021, 2023, 2026)
- Most appearances in a final without ever winning: 5
  - Lorrha (1905, 1948, 1956, 1966, 1984)
- Most appearances in a final without losing (streak): 21
  - Thurles Sarsfields (1904, 1906, 1907, 1908, 1909, 1911, 1929, 1935, 1936, 1938, 1939, 1942, 1944, 1945, 1946, 1952, 1955, 1956, 1957, 1958, 1959)
- Most defeats: 11
  - Roscrea (1936, 1945, 1954, 1963, 1967, 1971, 1976, 1978, 1981, 1982, 1985)

==== Individual ====
- Most wins by a player: 14, Mickey Byrne (Thurles Sarsfields) (1944, 1945, 1946, 1952, 1955, 1956, 1957, 1958, 1959, 1961, 1962, 1963, 1964, 1965)

=== Teams ===
==== By decade ====
The most successful team of each decade, judged by number of Tipperary Senior Hurling Championship titles, is as follows:

- 1890s: 3 for Tubberadora (1895-96-98)
- 1900s: 5 for Thurles Sarsfields (1904-06-07-08-09)
- 1910s: 5 for Toomevara (1910-12-13-14-19)
- 1920s: 5 for Boherlahen-Dualla (1922-24-25-27-28)
- 1930s: 4 each for Moycarkey-Borris (1932-33-34-37) and Thurles Sarsfields (1935-36-38-39)
- 1940s: 4 for Thurles Sarsfields (1942-44-45-46)
- 1950s: 6 for Thurles Sarsfields (1952-55-56-57-58-59)
- 1960s: 5 for Thurles Sarsfields (1961-62-63-64-65)
- 1970s: 3 each for Roscrea (1970-72-73) and Kilruane MacDonagh's (1977-78-79)
- 1980s: 3 for Borris-Ileigh (1981-83-86)
- 1990s: 5 for Toomevara (1992-93-94-98-99)
- 2000s: 6 for Toomevara (2000-01-03-04-06-08)
- 2010s: 6 for Thurles Sarsfields (2010-12-14-15-16-17)
- 2020s: 3 for Loughmore-Castleiney (2021-2024-2025)

==== Gaps ====
Top ten longest gaps between successive championship titles:

- 101 years: Clonoulty-Rossmore (1888-1989)
- 55 years: Boherlahen-Dualla (1941-1996)
- 42 years: Moycarkey-Borris (1940-1982)
- 37 years: Kilruane MacDonaghs (1985-2022)
- 36 years: Holycross-Ballycahill (1954-1990)
- 32 years: Toomevara (1960-1992)
- 31 years: Thurles Sarsfields (1974-2005)
- 29 years: Toomevara (1931-1960)
- 28 years: Borris-Ileigh (1953-1981)
- 20 years: Toomevara (1890-1910)

=== Top scorers ===
==== Finals (1980-present) ====
Final	Top scorer	Team	Score	Total
1980	Francis Loughnane	Roscrea	1-07	10
1981	Noel O'Dwyer	Borris-Ileigh	0-08	8
1982	John Flanagan (D)	Moycarkey-Borris	0-07	7
1982	John Flanagan (R)	Moycarkey-Borris	1-05	8
1983	Pat McGrath	Loughmore-Castleiney	0-08	8
1984	John Flanagan	Moycarkey-Borris	1-03	6
1985	Eamon O'Shea	Kilruane MacDonagh's	1-04	7
1986	Philip Kenny	Borris-Ileigh	0-06	6
1987	Pat McGrath	Loughmore-Castleiney	1-08	11
1988	Noel O'Dwyer (D)	Borris-Ileigh	0-04	4
1988	Noel O'Dwyer (R)	Borris-Ileigh	0-04	4
1988	Séamus Devaney (R)	Borris-Ileigh	0-04	4
1989	Kevin Ryan	Clonoulty-Rossmore	0-04	4
1989	Stephen Dwan	Holycross-Ballycahill	0-04	4
1990	Tommy Grogan	Cashel King Cormacs	0-06	6
1991	Tommy Grogan	Cashel King Cormacs	1-04	7
1992	Séamus Quinn (D)	Thurles Sarsfields	1-02	5
1992	Connie Maher (R)	Thurles Sarsfields	1-05	8
1993	Michael Cleary	Nenagh Éire Óg	0-09	9
1994	Tommy Dunne	Toomevara	1-04	7
1995	Michael Cleary	Nenagh Éire Óg	0-08	8
1996	Kevin Kennedy	Toomevara	2-00	6
1996	Philip O'Dwyer	Boherlahen-Dualla	1-03	6
1996	Aodán Flanagan	Boherlahen-Dualla	0-06	6
1997	Michael Kennedy	Clonoulty-Rossmore	0-07	7
1997	John Leahy	Mullinahone	0-07	7
1998	Michael Kennedy	Clonoulty-Rossmore	0-06	6
1999	Tommy Dunne	Toomevara	1-07	10
2000	John O'Brien	Toomevara	2-02	8
2001	John Enright	Thurles Sarsfields	1-09	12
2002	Eoin Kelly (D)	Mullinahone	0-04	4
2002	Eoin Kelly (R)	Mullinahone	2-07	13
2003	Lar Corbett	Thurles Sarsfields	2-01	7
2004	Paddy O'Brien	Toomevara	2-03	9
2005	Séamus Butler	Drom-Inch	0-11	11
2006	John O'Brien	Toomevara	1-04	7
2007	Evan Sweeney	Loughmore-Castleiney	0-09	9
2008	John Enright	Thurles Sarsfields	0-13	13
2009	John Enright	Thurles Sarsfields	0-05	5
2010	John O'Neill	Clonoulty-Rossmore	1-01	4
2010	Pa Bourke	Thurles Sarsfields	0-04	4
2011	Timmy Hammersley	Clonoulty-Rossmore	0-06	6
2011	Séamus Callanan	Drom-Inch	0-06	6
2012	Aidan McCormack	Thurles Sarsfields	1-06	9
2012	Johnny Ryan	Drom-Inch	0-09	9
2013	Noel McGrath	Loughmore-Castleiney	0-07	7
2013	Michael Heffernan	Nenagh Éire Óg	0-07	7
2014	Pa Bourke	Thurles Sarsfields	1-03	6
2015	Michael Heffernan	Nenagh Éire Óg	1-04	7
2016	Pa Bourke	Thurles Sarsfields	0-09	9
2017	Aidan McCormack	Thurles Sarsfields	0-09	9
2018	Timmy Hammersley	Clonoulty-Rossmore	0-12	12
2019	James Devaney	Borris-Ileigh	1-04	7
2019	Willie Connors	Kiladangan	0-07	7
2020	John McGrath	Loughmore-Castleiney	1-10	13
2021	John McGrath (D)	Loughmore-Castleiney	0-12	12
2021	John McGrath (R)	Loughmore-Castleiney	0-07	7
2022	Willie Cleary (D)	Kilruane MacDonaghs	0-10	10
2022	Bryan McLoughney (D)	Kiladangan	0-10	10
2022	Willie Cleary (R)	Kilruane MacDonaghs	0-11	11
2023	Aidan McCormack (D)	Thurles Sarsfields	0-11	11
2023	Aidan McCormack (R)	Thurles Sarsfields	0-13	13
2024	John McGrath	Loughmore-Castleiney	1-13	16
2025	Michael Heffernan	Nenagh Éire Óg	1-08	11

== See also ==
- List of Tipperary Senior Hurling Championship winners
- Tipperary Premier Intermediate Hurling Championship
- Tipperary Intermediate Hurling Championship
- Tipperary Junior A Hurling Championship
