= 2007 Tipperary Senior Hurling Championship =

Annual hurling competition season

The 2007 Tipperary Senior Hurling Championship is an annual competition between the top hurling clubs in Tipperary. The winners of the Tipperary Championship qualify to represent their county in the Munster Club Championship, the winners of which go on to the All-Ireland Senior Club Hurling Championship.

The Tipperary County Champions in 2006 were Toomevara who became champions with a win over Nenagh Éire Óg. The Tipperary senior hurling championship is probably the most complicated system in Ireland as it strives to accommodate 25 teams. A knockout divisional system and group backdoor system has been introduced to accommodate these teams. Before the new system, the county championship was run on a divisional basis with the teams in the divisional finals going into the county quarter-finals and proceeding from there. It may not be long before this system is re-introduced because of the complexity of the current championship.

== 2007 Divisional Championship ==
=== North Tipperary ===
The North Tipperary Championship is contested by nine teams: Borris-Ileigh, Burgess, Kildangan, Kilruane McDonaghs, Moneygall, Nenagh Éire Óg, Portroe, Roscrea, Toomevara. The championship is a knockout competition with the losers apart from the semi-final runner-up entering the County Championship. The winners of the North Championship advance to the quarter-final of the County Championship.

| Game | Date | Venue | Team A | Score | Team B | Score | Report |
| North Tipperary SHC; Preliminary round | 7 May | Nenagh | Kildangan | 3-12 | Kilruane McDonaghs | 3-10 | |
| North Tipperary SHC; Quarter-final | 19 May | Cloughjordan | Nenagh Eire Óg | 2-21 | Roscrea | 2-14 | |
| North Tipperary SHC; Quarter-final | 20 May | Nenagh | Kildangan | 1-14 | Moneygall | 1-12 | |
| North Tipperary SHC; Quarter-final | 20 May | Nenagh | Toomevara | 3-13 | Portroe | 2-10 | |
| North Tipperary SHC; Quarter-final | 20 May | Dolla | Borris-Ileigh | 0-14 | Burgess | 0-11 | |
| North Tipperary SHC; Semi-final | 19 August | Nenagh | Nenagh Eire Óg | 3-10 | Kildangan | 2-10 | |
| North Tipperary SHC; Semi-final | 19 August | Nenagh | Toomevara | 1-15 | Borris-Ileigh | 1-20 | |
| North Tipperary SHC; Final | 9 September | Nenagh | Borris-Ileigh | 0-19 | Nenagh Eire Óg | 0-16 | |

=== Mid Tipperary ===
The Mid Tipperary Championship is contested by seven teams: Boherlahan-Dualla, Drom-Inch, Holycross-Ballycahill, J.K. Bracken's, Loughmore-Castleiney, Thurles Sarsfields and Upperchurch-Drombane. The championship is a knockout competition with the losers apart from the one semi final runner-up (Upperchurch-Drombane in 2006) entering the County Championship. The winners of the Mid Championship advance to the county quarter final. Upperchurch-Drombane receive a bye to the semi-final.

| Game | Date | Venue | Team A | Score | Team B | Score | Report |
| Mid Tipperary SHC; Quarter-final | 6 May | Semple Stadium | Loughmore-Castleiney | 1-20 | Boherlahan-Dualla | 1-13 | |
| Mid Tipperary SHC; Quarter-final | 6 May | Boherlahan | Thurles Sarsfields | 1-21 | Holycross-Ballycahill | 2-11 | |
| Mid Tipperary SHC; Quarter-final | 13 May | Holycross | Drom-Inch | 1-10 | J.K. Bracken's | 2-14 | |
| Mid Tipperary SHC; Semi-final | 20 May | The Ragg | Thurles Sarsfields | 1-19 | Upperchurch-Drombane | 1-14 | |
| North Tipperary SHC; Semi-final | 19 August | The Ragg | Loughmore-Castleiney | 4-10 | J.K. Bracken's | 2-14 | |
| Mid Tipperary SHC; Final | 9 September | Semple Stadium | Thurles Sarsfields | 0-22 | Loughmore-Castleiney | 3-09 | |

=== West Tipperary ===
The West Tipperary Championship is contested by five teams: Cappawhite, Cashel King Cormacs, Clonoulty-Rossmore, Éire Óg Annacarty and Knockavilla-Donaskeigh Kickhams. The championship is a knockout competition with the winners advancing to the quarter-final of the County Championship. The other four contestants also play in the first phase of the County Championship (group stage).

| Game | Date | Venue | Team A | Score | Team B | Score | Report |
| West Tipperary SHC; Quarter-final | 29 April | Dundrum | Clonoulty-Rossmore | 1-17 | Cappawhite | 0-16 | |
| West Tipperary SHC; Semi-final | 13 May | Cappawhite | Clonoulty-Rossmore | 1-15 | Éire Óg Annacarty | 2-12 | |
| West Tipperary SHC; Semi-final Replay | 26 May | Dundrum | Clonoulty-Rossmore | 1-14 | Éire Óg Annacarty | 1-7 | |
| West Tipperary SHC; Semi-final | 27 May | Golden | Knockavilla-Donaskeigh Kickhams | 0-10 | Cashel King Cormacs | 0-10 | |
| West Tipperary SHC; Semi-final Replay | 30 May | Golden | Knockavilla-Donaskeigh Kickhams | 3-11 | Cashel King Cormacs | 3-8 | |
| West Tipperary SHC; Final | 15 July | Cashel | Clonoulty-Rossmore | 1-18 | Knockavilla-Donaskeigh Kickhams | 0-11 | |

=== South Tipperary ===
The South Tipperary Championship is contested by four teams: Ballingarry, Carrick Swans, Killenaule and Mullinahone. The championship is a 'knockout' competition. However, the three semi-finalists losers going into the County Championship. The winners of the South Championship advance directly to the quarter-final of the County championship, while the other three divisional semi-finalists also play in the first phase of the County Championship (group stage).

| Game | Date | Venue | Team A | Score | Team B | Score | Report |
| South Tipperary SHC; Semi-final | 20 May | Clonmel | Ballingarry | 0-20 | Carrick Swans | 1-13 | |
| South Tipperary SHC; Semi-final | 20 May | Clonmel | Mullinahone | 0-10 | Killenaule | 2-12 | |
| South Tipperary SHC; Final | 19 August | Fethard | Killenaule | 0-14 | Ballingarry | 0-13 | |

== 2007 Tipperary County Championship ==
The 14 teams defeated in their divisional championship are divided into groups of 4.Top Team in each group go into Round 2. Group 2 winners receive a Bye (Drawn).Other 3 play remaining 3 beaten Semi-finalists in North and Mid.ie. Loughmore-Castleiney v J.K. Bracken's, Nenagh Éire Óg v Kildangan and Toomevara v Borris-Ileigh. Bottom team in each Group contest Relegation play-off.

=== Group 1 ===
| Date | Venue | Team A | Score | Team B | Score | Report |
| 1 July | Templederry | Burgess | 2-16 | Holycross-Ballycahill | 0-12 | |
| 4 August | Semple Stadium | Burgess | 1-11 | Carrick Swans | 1-11 | |
| 18 August | Clonmel | Holycross-Ballycahill | 1-10 | Carrick Swans | 1-9 | |

| Team | P | W | D | L | F | A | Pts. | Score Dif. |
| Burgess | 2 | 1 | 1 | 0 | 3-27 | 1-23 | 3 | +10 |
| Holycross-Ballycahill | 2 | 1 | 0 | 1 | 1-22 | 3-25 | 2 | -9 |
| Carrick Swans | 2 | 0 | 1 | 1 | 2-20 | 2-21 | 1 | -1 |

=== Group 2 ===
| Date | Venue | Team A | Score | Team B | Score | Report |
| 16 June | Templemore | Portroe | 3-13 | Cappawhite | 1-18 | |
| 30 June | Dolla | Cappawhite | 0-16 | Kilruane McDonaghs | 1-10 | |
| 15 July | Nenagh | Kilruane McDonaghs | 2-13 | Portroe | 1-13 | |
| 3 August | Boherlahan | Drom-Inch | 1-19 | Cappawhite | 1-13 | |
| 18 August | Dolla | Drom-Inch | 2-22 | Kilruane McDonaghs | 1-14 | |
| 24 August | Dolla | Drom-Inch | | Portroe | | |

| Team | P | W | D | L | F | A | Pts. | Score Dif. |
| Drom-Inch | 2 | 2 | 0 | 0 | 3-41 | 2-27 | 4 | +17 |
| Portroe | 2 | 1 | 0 | 1 | 4-26 | 3-31 | 2 | -2 |
| Cappawhite | 3 | 1 | 0 | 2 | 2-47 | 5-42 | 2 | -4 |
| Kilruane McDonaghs | 3 | 1 | 0 | 2 | 4-37 | 3-51 | 2 | -11 |

=== Group 3 ===
| Date | Venue | Team A | Score | Team B | Score | Report |
| 16 June | Templemore | Boherlahan-Dualla | 2-13 | Moneygall | 3-7 | |
| 4 August | Templemore | Boherlahan-Dualla | 2-10 | Roscrea | 0-16 | |
| 18 August | Templemore | Roscrea | 1-17 | Moneygall | 0-13 | |

| Team | P | W | D | L | F | A | Pts. | Score Dif. |
| Roscrea | 2 | 1 | 1 | 0 | 1-33 | 2-23 | 1 | +7 |
| Boherlahan-Dualla | 2 | 1 | 1 | 0 | 4-23 | 3-23 | 3 | +3 |
| Moneygall | 1 | 0 | 0 | 1 | 3-20 | 3-30 | 0 | -10 |

=== Group 4 ===
| Date | Venue | Team A | Score | Team B | Score | Report |
| 1 July | Dundrum | Upperchurch-Drombane | 2-13 | Éire Óg Annacarty | 3-17 | |
| 4 August | Semple Stadium | Mullinahone | 3-10 | Éire Óg Annacarty | 1-10 | |
| 4 August | Holycross | Upperchurch-Drombane | 2-12 | Cashel King Cormacs | 1-11 | |
| 15 August | Cashel | Mullinahone | 3-19 | Upperchurch-Drombane | 0-14 | |
| 15 August | Golden | Éire Óg Annacarty | 0-14 | Cashel King Cormacs | 2-13 | |
| 19 August | Monroe | Mullinahone | 5-15 | Cashel King Cormacs | 2-12 | |

| Team | P | W | D | L | F | A | Pts. | Score Dif. |
| Mullinahone | 3 | 3 | 0 | 0 | 11-44 | 3-36 | 6 | +32 |
| Éire Óg Annacarty | 3 | 1 | 0 | 2 | 4-41 | 7-36 | 2 | -4 |
| Cashel King Cormacs | 3 | 1 | 0 | 2 | 5-36 | 7-41 | 2 | -11 |
| Upperchurch-Drombane | 3 | 1 | 0 | 2 | 4-39 | 7-47 | 2 | -17 |
