= 2017 Tipperary Senior Hurling Championship =

Annual hurling competition season

- Dates: 28 April - 8 October 2017
- Teams: 16
- Sponsor: Tipperary Water
- Champions: Thurles Sarsfields (36th title); Pádraic Maher (captain); Tommy Maher (manager)
- Runners-up: Borris-Ileigh; Paddy Stapleton (captain); Johnny Kelly (manager)
- Relegated: Ballina; Burgess

Tournament statistics
- Matches played: 35
- Goals scored: 104 (2.97 per match)
- Points scored: 1177 (33.63 per match)
- Top scorer(s): Pa Bourke (3-43)

The 2017 Tipperary Senior Hurling Championship was the 126th staging of the Tipperary Senior Hurling Championship since its establishment by the Tipperary County Board in 1887. The draw for the group stage placings took place on 23 January 2017. The championship began on 28 April 2017 and ended on 8 October 2017.

Thurles Sarsfields were the defending champions and entered the championship in search of a fourth successive title. Ballina and Burgess were relegated after finishing bottom of the relegation group.

The final was played on 8 October 2017 at Semple Stadium in Thurles, between Thurles Sarsfields and Borris-Ileigh, in their first meeting in a final in 62 years. Thurles Sarsfields won the match by 1–24 to 0–11 to claim their 36th championship title overall and a fourth title in succession.

Thurles Sarsfields' Pa Bourke was the championship's top scorer with 3-43.

== Results ==
=== Group stage ===
==== Group 1 table ====
| Team | Matches | | | | Score | | | Pts |
| Team | Pld | W | D | L | For | Against | Diff | Pts |
|---|---|---|---|---|---|---|---|---|
| Loughmore-Castleiney | 3 | 2 | 1 | 0 | 5-54 | 3-48 | 12 | 5 |
| Borris-Ileigh | 3 | 1 | 1 | 1 | 6-46 | 2-51 | 7 | 3 |
| Upperchurch-Drombane | 3 | 1 | 0 | 2 | 0-48 | 7-45 | -18 | 2 |
| Kiladangan | 3 | 1 | 0 | 2 | 4-43 | 3-47 | -1 | 2 |

==== Group 1 results ====
| 30 April 2017 Round 1 | Kiladangan | 1-20 - 1-13 | Borris-Ileigh | MacDonagh Park |
| | D Egan 1-10, W Connors 0-2, T Gallagher 0-2, J Horan 0-2, J Gallagher 0-1, P Flynn 0-1, E Kelly 0-1, B Seymour 0-1. | | J Kelly 0-7, K Maher 1-0, C Kenny 0-3, B Maher 0-1, D McCormack 0-1, B Maher 0-1. |

| 30 April 2017 Round 1 | Loughmore-Castleiney | 2-19 - 0-18 | Upperchurch-Drombane | Boherlahan GAA Grounds |
| | J McGrath 2-10, N McGrath 0-3, C Hennessy 0-2, L McGrath 0-2, T McGrath 0-1, E Sweeney 0-1. | | P Ryan 0-11, P Shortt 0-2, J Butler 0-2, P Greene 0-1, J Barry 0-1, C Stapleton 0-1. |

| 28 May 2017 Round 2 | Borris-Ileigh | 1-16 - 1-16 | Loughmore-Castleiney | Semple Stadium |
| | B Maher 0-9, C Kenny 1-2, L Ryan 0-2, S McCormack 0-1, K Maher 0-1, D McCormack 0-1. | | J McGrath 0-10, C Hennessy 1-1, C McGrath 0-2, N McGrath 0-2, L McGrath 0-1. |

| 28 May 2017 Round 2 | Upperchurch-Drombane | 0-15 - 1-09 | Kiladangan | Silvermines GAA Grounds |
| | P Ryan 0-11, D Grant 0-1, C Ryan 0-1, J Barry 0-1, P Shanahan 0-1. | | D Egan 1-4, B Seymour 0-2, R Gleeson 0-1, A Flynn 0-1, J Gallagher 0-1. |

| 12 August 2017 Round 3 | Upperchurch-Drombane | 0-15 - 4-17 | Borris-Ileigh | Semple Stadium |
| | P Ryan 0-9, L Ryan 0-2, O Greene 0-2, C Stapleton 0-1, J Barry 0-1. | | B Maher 1-6, C Kenny 1-5, N Kenny 2-0, J Hogan 0-2, J Kelly 0-1, K Maher 0-1, D McCormack 0-1, L Ryan 0-1. |

| 12 August 2017 Round 3 | Kiladangan | 2-14 - 2-19 | Loughmore-Castleiney | Silvermines GAA Grounds |
| | P Flynn 1-2, T Gallagher 0-5, D O'Meara 1-0, W Connors 0-3, B Seymour 0-2, D Sweeney 0-1, D Egan 0-1. | | J McGrath 2-5, L Treacy 0-4, N McGrath 0-4, C Hennessy 0-2, T Maher 0-2, A McGrath 0-1, L McGrath 0-1. |

==== Group 2 table ====
| Team | Matches | | | | Score | | | Pts |
| Team | Pld | W | D | L | For | Against | Diff | Pts |
|---|---|---|---|---|---|---|---|---|
| Clonoulty-Rossmore | 3 | 2 | 1 | 0 | | | 9 | 5 |
| Drom-Inch | 3 | 2 | 0 | 1 | | | 15 | 4 |
| Portroe | 3 | 0 | 2 | 1 | | | -14 | 2 |
| Ballina | 3 | 0 | 1 | 2 | | | -10 | 1 |

==== Group 2 results ====
| 29 April 2018 Round 1 | Portroe | 0-10 - 3-15 | Drom-Inch | Silvermines GAA Grounds |
| | J Ryan 0-2, R Byrne 0-2, M Gennery 0-2, J Sheedy 0-2, M Breen 0-1, N Gleeson 0-1. | | S Nolan 0-5, M Butler 1-1, D Collins 0-4, M Connors 1-0, T Nolan 1-0, P Kennedy 0-2, J Ryan 0-2, E Buckley 0-1. |

| 30 April 2017 Round 1 | Clonoulty-Rossmore | 0-16 - 1-10 | Ballina | Silvermines GAA Grounds |
| | T Hammersley 0-6, P White 0-2, C Hammersley 0-2, J O'Neill 0-2, F O'Keeffe 0-2, A White 0-1, A Ryan 0-1. | | M Breen 0-6, S O'Brien 1-0, J O'Brien 0-1, D Hickey 0-1, R Burke 0-1, B King 0-1. |

| 26 May 2017 Round 2 | Ballina | 2-17 - 3-14 | Portroe | MacDonagh Park |
| | M Breen 1-8, S O'Brien 1-1, B McKeogh 0-2, J O'Brien 0-2, S S Stritch 0-1, P Cosgrave 0-1, B King 0-1, TJ O'Connell 0-1. | | J Sheedy 1-5, J Creamer 1-1, J Moloney 1-1, K O'Halloran 0-3, J Ryan 0-2, P O'Flaherty 0-1, D Gleeson 0-1. |

| 28 May 2017 Round 2 | Drom-Inch | 2-15 - 1-24 | Clonoulty-Rossmore | Semple Stadium |
| | S Callanan 2-6, T Nolan 0-3, M Connors 0-2, D Collins 0-2, J Woodlock 0-1, P Campion 0-1. | | T Hammersley 0-12, C Hammersley 1-0, J O'Neill 0-2, S Maher 0-2, A White 0-2, M Ryan 0-2, D Quirke 0-2, S O'Connor 0-1, T Butler 0-1. |

| 12 August 2017 Round 3 | Drom-Inch | 3-20 - 2-16 | Ballina | MacDonagh Park |
| | S Callanan 1-7, E Buckley 1-2, D Collins 0-5, D Butler 1-0, M Connors 0-3, T Nolan 0-1, S Nolan 0-1, P Kennedy 0-1. | | D Finnerty 2-2, M Breen 0-5, D Hickey 0-5, S O'Brien 0-2, S Stritch 0-1, B McKeogh 0-1. |

| 12 August 2017 Round 3 | Clonoulty-Rossmore | 0-22 - 1-19 | Portroe | Silvermines GAA Grounds |
| | J O'Neill 0-13, D Quirke 0-3, F O'Keeffe 0-2, A White 0-2, T Burler 0-2. | | M Gennery 1-3, J Sheedy 0-6, R Byrne 0-3, K O'Halloran 0-3, J Ryan 0-1, P Flaherty 0-1, N Gleeson 0-1, John Moloney 0-1. |

==== Group 3 table ====
| Team | Matches | | | | Score | | | Pts |
| Team | Pld | W | D | L | For | Against | Diff | Pts |
|---|---|---|---|---|---|---|---|---|
| Thurles Sarsfields | 3 | 3 | 0 | 0 | | | 63 | 6 |
| Kilruane MacDonaghs | 3 | 2 | 0 | 1 | | | 14 | 4 |
| Nenagh Éire Óg | 3 | 1 | 0 | 2 | | | 6 | 2 |
| Carrick Swans | 3 | 0 | 0 | 3 | | | -83 | 0 |

==== Group 3 results ====
| 29 April 2017 Round 1 | Thurles Sarsfields | 5-32 - 0-07 | Carrick Swans | Leahy Park |
| | P Bourke 0-13, M O'Brien 3-3, A McCormack 1-4, J Maher 1-1, S Cahill 0-3, Pádraic Maher 0-2, M Cahill 0-2, D Maher 0-2, L Corbertt 0-1, B McCarthy 0-1. | | G O'Halloran 0-5, L O'Dwyer 0-1, D O'Hanlon 0-1. |

| 30 April 2017 Round 1 | Nenagh Éire Óg | 0-15 - 3-17 | Kilruane MacDonaghs | St. Michael's Park |
| | M Heffernan 0-8, D Quinn 0-2, A Coffey 0-2, T Heffernan 0-2, B Heffernan 0-1. | | C Darcy 1-4, J Cahill 1-3, J Williams 1-0, S Hennessy 0-2, E Hogan 0-2, J Cahill 0-2, C Morgan 0-1, N O'Meara 0-1, D Peters 0-1, C Cleary 0-1. |

| 28 May 2017 Round 2 | Carrick Swans | 1-13 - 6-31 | Nenagh Éire Óg | St. Michael's Park |
| | S Hahessy 1-1, G O'Halloran 0-4, D O'Hanlon 0-2, D Fogarty 0-2, E O'Halloran 0-1, G Waters 0-1, D Waters 0-1, A Dunne 0-1. | | M Heffernan 1-14, J Morris 3-4, P Murphy 1-2, T Heffernan 0-5, A Coffey 1-1, N Moloney 0-3, P Hickey 0-2. |

| 28 May 2017 Round 2 | Kilruane MacDonaghs | 2-15 - 1-25 | Thurles Sarsfields | Páirc Shíleáin |
| | C Darcy 1-5, B O'Meara 1-4, J Williams 0-3, N O'Meara 0-1, C Cleary 0-1, J Cahill 0-1. | | P Bourke 1-6, T Doyle 0-4, L Corbett 0-3, M O'Brien 0-3, B McCarthy 0-2, A McCormack 0-2, D Maher 0-2, C Lanigan 0-1, S Cahill 0-1, S Lillis 0-1. |

| 13 August 2017 Round 3 | Kilruane MacDonaghs | 3-21 - 1-17 | Carrick Swans | Boherlahan Sportsfield |
| | C Darcy 1-8, T Cleary 1-2, J Williams 0-4, D Barrett 1-0, N O'Meara 0-3, J Cahill 0-2, S Hennessy 0-1, C Cleary 0-1. | | D O'Hanlon 1-6, G O'Halloran 0-7, K Lanigan 0-3, D Fogarty 0-1. |

| 12 August 2017 Round 3 | Thurles Sarsfields | 4-20 - 2-10 | Nenagh Éire Óg | Páirc Shíleáin |
| | P Burke 1-7, L Corbett 1-1, D Maher 1-1, S Cahill 0-4, A McCormack 0-4, M O'Brien 1-0, P Maher 0-1, B McCarthy 0-1. | | M Heffernan 0-6, T Heffernan 1-1, B Heffernan 1-0, J Mackey 0-1, P Murphy 0-1, P Morris 0-1. |

==== Group 4 table ====
| Team | Matches | | | | Score | | | Pts |
| Team | Pld | W | D | L | For | Against | Diff | Pts |
|---|---|---|---|---|---|---|---|---|
| Éire Óg Annacarty | 3 | 2 | 0 | 1 | | | 9 | 4 |
| Mullinahone | 3 | 2 | 0 | 1 | | | 2 | 4 |
| Killenaule | 3 | 2 | 0 | 1 | | | -1 | 4 |
| Burgess | 3 | 0 | 0 | 3 | | | -10 | 0 |

==== Group 4 results ====
| 28 April 2017 Round 1 | Burgess | 1-16 - 1-18 | Killenaule | Páirc Shíleáin |
| | S Murray 0-8, E Hogan 1-2, K Nealon 0-2, C Gill 0-2, B O'Flaherty 0-1, D Ryan 0-1. | | J O'Dwyer 0-10, T Doyle 1-2, D Fanning 0-2, K Bergin 0-2, M Doyle 0-1, E Barry 0-1. |

| 30 April 2017 Round 1 | Éire Óg Annacarty | 1-18 - 0-14 | Mullinahone | Boherlahan GAA Grounds |
| | C O'Brien 0-7, K Fox 1-2, R O'Brien 0-3, D Crosse 0-2, P Dwyer 0-1, T Fox 0-1, B Fox 0-1, S Ryan 0-1. | | S CUrran 0-10, G Norton 0-2, N Curran 0-1, G Cronin 0-1. |

| 28 May 2017 Round 2 | Mullinahone | 1-17 - 0-18 | Burgess | MacDonagh Park |
| | S Curran 0-10, G Browning 1-0, AJ Cronin 0-3, M Dunne 0-2, A Curran 0-1, E Keane 0-1. | | S Murray 0-13, K Nealon 0-2, C Gill 0-2, B Hogan 0-1. |

| 28 May 2017 Round 2 | Killenaule | 2-20 - 1-19 | Éire Óg Annacarty | Leahy Park |
| | J O'Dwyer 1-6, T Stakelum 1-0, K Bergin 0-3, E Barry 0-3, D Guinan 0-3, D Fanning 0-3, M Doyle 0-1, T Doyle 0-1. | | R O'Brien 1-4, C O'Brien 0-5, K Fox 0-4, B Fox 0-3, D O'Dwyer 0-1, S O'Brien 0-1, T Fox 0-1. |

| 12 August 2017 Round 3 | Killenaule | 1-13 - 2-17 | Mullinahone | Monroe Sportsfield |
| | J O'Dwyer 1-7, T Doyle 0-1, K Bergin 0-1, M Doyle 0-1, D Guinan 0-1, D Fanning 0-1, D O'Connor 0-1. | | G Horan 2-2, AJ Cronin 0-4, J Shelly 0-3, S Curran 0-3, M Dunne 0-2, N Curran 0-2, C Shelly 0-1. |

| 12 August 2017 Round 3 | Éire Óg Annacarty | 2-20 - 1-17 | Burgess | Semple Stadium |
| | R O'Brien 1-5, B Fox 1-3, C O'Brien 0-6, K Fox 0-3, S Ryan 0-2, P Downey 0-1. | | S Murray 0-7, S Maher 1-0, E Hogan 0-2, D Maher 0-2, J O'Flaherty 0-2, C Gill 0-2, P Gill 0-1, D Ryan 0-1. |

=== Relegation playoffs ===
==== Relegation section ====
| Team | Matches | | | | Score | | | Pts |
| Team | Pld | W | D | L | For | Against | Diff | Pts |
|---|---|---|---|---|---|---|---|---|
| Kiladangan | 2 | 2 | 0 | 0 | 3-40 | 3-18 | 22 | 4 |
| Burgess | 2 | 1 | 0 | 1 | 4-28 | 4-30 | -2 | 2 |
| Ballina | 2 | 0 | 0 | 2 | 3-20 | 3-40 | -20 | 0 |

==== Relegation playoffs ====
| 10 September 2017 Round 1 | Kiladangan | 1-20 - 1-10 | Ballina | Lacken Park |
| | D Egan 0-6, T Gallagher 0-5, J Gallagher 1-0, W Connors 0-3, R Gleeson 0-3, B Seymour 0-2, D Sweeney 0-1. | | M Breen 1-7, TJ O'Connell 0-1, D Hickey 0-1, S Stritch 0-1. |

| 16 September 2017 Round 2 | Ballina | 2-10 - 2-20 | Burgess | Silvermines GAA Grounds |
| | M Breen 1-8, D Finnerty 1-1, P Cosgrave 0-1. | | K Nealon 0-10, D Ryan 1-2, B Hogan 1-1, E Hogan 0-3, D Maher 0-3, C Gill 0-1. |

| 24 September 2017 Round 3 | Burgess | 2-08 - 2-20 | Kiladangan | MacDonagh Park |
| | S Murray 2-1, K Nealon 0-4, B Hogan 0-2, E Hogan 0-1. | | D O'Meara 1-2, T Gallagher 0-5, D Egan 0-4, R Gleeeson 0-3, J Gallagher 0-3, P Flynn 0-3, J Quigley 0-1. |

=== Knock-out stage ===
==== Preliminary quarter-final ====
| 10 September 2017 Preliminary quarter-final | Borris-Ileigh | 3-16 - 2-05 | Carrick Swans | Leahy Park |
| | B Maher 0-10, J Kelly 1-1, J Horgan 1-1, C Kenny 1-0, S McCormack 0-3, D McCormack 0-1. | | A Dunne 1-1, D McCarthy 1-0, G O'Halloran 0-3, D Waters 0-1. |

==== Quarter-finals ====
| 16 September 2017 Quarter-final | Éire Óg Annacarty | 2-13 - 1-15 | Mullinahone | Semple Stadium |
| | K Fox (1-2), B Fox (1-2), S Ryan (0-4 frees), D O'Dwyer (0-2), C O'Brien (0-1 free), P Aherne (0-1), S O'Brien (0-1). | Report | S Curran (0-10, 5 frees), K Walzer (1-1), AJ Cronin (0-2), C Shelly (0-1), M Dunne (0-1). |

| 16 September 2017 Quarter-final | Thurles Sarsfields | 3-26 - 1-22 (aet) | Kilruane MacDomaghs | Semple Stadium |
| | P Bourke 1-6, A McCormack 0-6, B McCarthy 0-5, D Maher 1-1, L Corbett 1-0, S Cahill 0-2, M O'Brien 0-2, Patrick Maher 0-1, T Doyle 0-1, C Lanigan 0-1, S Lillis 0-1. | Report | C Darcy 0-11, T Cleary 1-1, S Hennessy 0-3, K Cahill 0-2, B O'Meara 0-1, C Cleary 0-1, Jerome Cahill 0-1, Justin Cahill 0-1, N O'Meara 0-1. |

| 17 September 2017 Quarter-final | Drom-Inch | 2-26 - 1-14 | Clonoulty-Rossmore | Semple Stadium |
| | S Callanan 1-9, J Ryan 0-6, D Collins 0-5, J Maher 1-0, D Butler 0-2, M Campion 0-2, M Connors 0-1, J Woodlock 0-1. | Report | J O'Neill 1-5, T Hammersley 0-3, M Ryan 0-3, C Hammersley 0-1, J Devane 0-1, D Quirke 0-1. |

| 17 September 2017 Quarter-final | Borris-Ileigh | 1-18 - 1-17 | Loughmore-Castleiney | Semple Stadium |
| | B Maher 0-6 C Kenny 0-4, N Kenny 1-0, D McCormack 0-3, S McCormack 0-1, J Kelly 0-1, J Hogan 0-1, K Maher 0-1, P Stapleton 0-1. | Report | J McGrath 1-5, L McGrath 0-3, A McGrath 0-2, C McGrath 0-2, J Ryan 0-1, T McGrath 0-1, N McGrath 0-1, E Sweeney 0-1, B O'Connell 0-1. |

==== Semi-finals ====
| 24 September 2017 Semi-final | Borris-Ileigh | 1-16 - 1-12 | Drom-Inch | Semple Stadium |
| 3:30 pm | B Maher 0-7f, D McCormack 1-1, C Kenny and J Kelly 0-2 each, L Ryan, S McCormack, N Kenny, J Hogan 0-1 each. | Report | J Ryan and S Callanan (0-2f, 1 '65) 0-4 each, J Maher 1-0, D Butler 0-2, D Collins and T Nolan 0-1 each | Referee: J McCormack (Knockavilla Kickhams) |

| 24 September 2017 Semi-final | Thurles Sarsfields | 0-27 - 0-18 | Éire Óg Annacarty | Semple Stadium |
| 5:00 pm | P Bourke 0-9 (0-7f), A McCormack 0-5 (0-1f), R Maher, J Maher, R Purcell 0-2 each, S Maher, M Cahill, S Lillis, S Cahill, B McCarthy, C Stakelum, D Maher 0-1 each | Report | R O’Brien 0-6, D Mooney 0-5f, S Ryan 0-3 (0-2f), B Fox, T Fox, D O’Dwyer, C Bradshaw 0-1 each | Referee: M Murphy (Toomevara) |

==== Final ====
| 8 October 2017 Final | Thurles Sarsfields | 1-24 - 0-11 | Borris-Ileigh | Semple Stadium |
| 3:30 pm | A McCormack 0-9 (6f, 1 '65), C Stakelum 1-2, B McCarthy and D Maher 0-3 each, P Bourke and L Corbett 0-2 each, R Maher, P Maher, S Cahill 0-1 each | Report | B Maher 0-5f, D McCormack 0-3, L Ryan 0-2, K Maher 0-1 | Attendance: 8,376; Referee: F Horgan (Knockavilla Kickhams); Man of the Match: Pádraic Maher |

== Championship statistics ==
=== Top scorers ===
Overall

| Rank | Player | Club | Tally | Total | Matches | Average |
|---|---|---|---|---|---|---|
| 1 | Pa Bourke | Thurles Sarsfields | 3-43 | 52 | 6 | 8.66 |
| 2 | Brendan Maher | Borris-Ileigh | 1-44 | 47 | 7 | 6.71 |
| 3 | John McGrath | Loughmore-Castleiney | 5-30 | 45 | 4 | 11.25 |
| 4 | Michael Breen | Ballina | 3-34 | 43 | 5 | 8.60 |
| 5 | Séamus Callanan | Drom-Inch | 4-26 | 38 | 4 | 9.50 |
| 6 | Cian Darcy | Kilruane MacDonaghs | 3-28 | 37 | 4 | 9.25 |
| 7 | Stephen Murray | Burgess | 2-29 | 35 | 4 | 8.75 |
| 8 | Aidan McCormack | Thurles Sarsfields | 1-30 | 33 | 6 | 5.50 |
| 8 | Seán Curran | Mullinahone | 0-33 | 33 | 4 | 8.25 |
| 10 | Darragh Egan | Kiladangan | 2-25 | 31 | 5 | 6.20 |
| 10 | Michael Heffernan | Nenagh Éire Óg | 1-28 | 31 | 4 | 8.75 |
| 10 | Paul Ryan | Upperchurch-Drombane | 0-31 | 31 | 3 | 10.33 |

In a single game

| Rank | Player | Club | Tally | Total | Opposition |
|---|---|---|---|---|---|
| 1 | Michael Heffernan | Nenagh Éire Óg | 1-14 | 17 | Carrick Swans |
| 2 | John McGrath | Loughmore-Castleiney | 2-10 | 16 | Upperchurch-Drombane |
| 3 | Jake Morris | Nenagh Éire Óg | 3-04 | 13 | Carrick Swans |
| 3 | Darragh Egan | Kiladangan | 1-10 | 13 | Borris-Ileigh |
| 3 | John O'Neill | Clonoulty-Rossmore | 0-13 | 13 | Portroe |
| 3 | Pa Bourke | Thurles Sarsfields | 0-13 | 13 | Carrick Swans |
| 3 | Stephen Murray | Burgess | 0-13 | 13 | Mullinahone |
| 8 | Michael O'Brien | Thurles Sarsfields | 3-03 | 12 | Carrick Swans |
| 8 | Séamus Callanan | Drom-Inch | 2-06 | 12 | Clonoulty-Rossmore |
| 8 | Séamus Callanan | Drom-Inch | 1-09 | 12 | Clonoulty-Rossmore |
| 8 | Timmy Hammersley | Clonoulty-Rossmore | 0-12 | 12 | Drom-Inch |
