= 2019 Tipperary Senior Hurling Championship =

Annual hurling competition season

- Dates: 6 April 2019 – 3 November 2019
- Teams: 17
- Sponsor: FBD Insurance
- Champions: Borris-Ileigh (7th title); Conor Kenny (captain); Seán McCormack (captain); Johnny Kelly (manager)
- Runners-up: Kiladangan; Joe Gallagher (captain); Brian Lawlor (manager)

Tournament statistics
- Matches played: 35
- Goals scored: 97 (2.77 per match)
- Points scored: 1205 (34.43 per match)
- Top scorer(s): Cian Darcy (3-46)

The 2019 Tipperary Senior Hurling Championship was the 128th staging of the Tipperary Senior Hurling Championship since its establishment by the Tipperary County Board in 1887. The championship began on 6 April 2019 and ended on 3 November 2019.

Clonoulty-Rossmore were the defending champions, however, they were defeated by Kilruane MacDonaghs at the quarter-final stage.

On 3 November 2019, Borris-Ileigh won the championship after a 1–15 to 1–12 defeat of Kiladangan in the final at Semple Stadium. It was their 7th championship title overall and their first title since 1986.

== Results ==
=== Group 1 ===
==== Table ====
Team	Matches				Score			Pts
Team	Pld	W	D	L	For	Against	Diff	Pts
Nenagh Éire Óg	3	2	1	0	76	61	15	5
Loughmore-Castleiney	3	1	2	0	81	65	16	4
Upperchurch-Drombane	3	1	0	2	57	81	-24	2
Burgess	3	0	1	2	70	77	-7	1

==== Group 1 results ====
6 April 2019 Round 1	Nenagh Éire Óg	2-21 - 1-15	Upperchurch-Drombane	Dolla
	J Morris 1-7, T Heffernan 1-2, B Heffernan 0-4, P Murphy 0-2, J Mackey 0-2, K Gleeson 0-1, M Heffernan 0-1.		P Green 0-8, L Ryan 1-0, J Butler 0-2, P Ryan 0-2, M Lee 0-2, C Stapleton 0-1.	Referee: P Ivors (Ballingarry)

6 April 2019 Round 1	Burgess	2-21 - 2-21	Loughmore-Castleiney	Borrisoleigh
	S Murray 1-14, D Ryan 1-1, D Maher 0-4, J O'Flaherty 0-1, T Dunne 0-1.		L McGrath 1-5, J McGrath 0-6, N McGrath 0-4, A Ryan 1-0, L Treacy 0-3, P Nyland 0-1, T McGrath 0-1, W Eviston 0-1.	Referee: J Ryan (Boherlahan-Dualla)

1 September 2019 Round 2	Loughmore-Castleiney	1-17 - 0-20	Nenagh Éire Óg	The Ragg
	J McGrath 1-3, N McGrath 0-4, L McGrath 0-4, A McGrath 0-2, J Nyland 0-1, E Sweeney 0-1, B McGrath 0-1, C McGrath 0-1.		M Heffernan 0-9, J Morris 0-6, T Heffernan 0-3, D Quinn 0-1, J Mackey 0-1.	Referee: J O'Grady (Rosegreen)

1 September 2019 Round 2	Upperchurch-Drombane	0-21 - 1-17	Burgess	The Ragg
	P Greene 0-11, P Ryan 0-3, J Butler 0-2, M Lee 0-2, J Barry 0-1, P Shortt 0-1, G Ryan 0-1.		S Murray 1-10, T Dunne 0-2, J Mulqueen 0-2, E Hogan 0-2, T O'Halloran 0-1.	Referee: K Delahunty (Moyle Rovers)

7 September 2019 Round 3	Upperchurch-Drombane	0-18 - 3-25	Loughmore-Castleiney	Templetuohy
	P Greene 0-11, P Ryan 0-3, J Barry 0-1, M Lee 0-1, D Grant 0-1, P Shanahan 0-1.		J McGrath 2-3, N McGrath 0-7, L McGrath 1-3, E Sweeney 0-4, A McGrath 0-3, T McGrath 0-3, J Meagher 0-1, L Treacy 0-1.	Referee: F Horgan (Knockavilla)

8 September 2019 Round 3	Burgess	2-17 - 2-23	Nenagh Éire Óg	Toomevara
	S Murray 0-11, T Dunne 2-1, S Kirwan 0-2, T O'Halloran 0-1, J Mulqueen 0-1, E Hogan 0-1.		M Heffernan 0-10, J Morris 1-1, T Heffernan 0-4, P Hickey 1-0, K Gleeson 0-2, A Healy 0-2, C Hennessy 0-2, A Coffey 0-1, B Heffernan 0-1.	Referee: S Delaney (JK Brackens)

=== Group 2 ===
==== Table ====
Team	Matches				Score			Pts
Team	Pld	W	D	L	For	Against	Diff	Pts
Borris-Ileigh	3	2	0	1	67	58	9	4
Toomevara	3	2	0	1	64	66	-2	4
Clonoulty-Rossmore	2	1	0	2	66	61	-5	2
Moycarkey-Borris	3	1	0	2	61	73	-12	2

==== Group 2 results ====
7 April 2019 Round 1	Borris-Ileigh	1-18 - 1-15	Clonoulty-Rossmore	Holycross
	B Maher 0-6, N Kenny 1-0, K Maher 0-3, J Kelly 0-3, D McCormack 0-2, P Stapleton 0-1, S McCormack 0-1, J Devaney 0-1, C Kenny 0-1.		T Hammersley 0-8, C Bourke 1-4, D Quirke 0-3.	Referee: K Jordan (Thurles Gaels)

7 April 2019 Round 1	Moycarkey-Borris	1-17 - 2-19	Toomevara	Templemore
	K Morris 0-12, M Hackett 1-0, A McKelvey 0-2, K Cummins 0-1, J Fallon 0-1, J Power 0-1.		M McCarthy 0-11, J McLoughney 1-4, P Ryan 1-0, K McCarthy 0-2, R Quirke 0-1, J Delaney 0-1.	Referee: F Horgan (Knockavilla Kickhams)

31 August 2019 Round 2	Toomevara	1-15 - 3-18	Borris-Ileigh	Nenagh
	M McCarthy 1-9, R Quirke 0-3, S Nolan 0-1, J Delaney 0-1, J Ryan 0-1.		JD Devaney 2-1, C Kenny 0-6, K Maher 0-6, B Maher 1-1, J Kelly 0-2, N Kenny 0-1, D McCormack 0-1.	Referee: P Carroll (Burgess)

1 September 2019 Round 2	Clonoulty-Rossmore	4-17 - 1-16	Moycarkey-Borris	Boherlahan
	D Quirke 2-3, T Hammersley 1-5, S Maher 1-1, C Hammersley 0-3, M Rayn 0-2, F O'Keeffe 0-1, T Butler 0-1, J Hammersley 0-1.		A McKelvey 0-6, M Hackett 1-0, C Hayes 0-3, J Power 0-3, P Molloy 0-1, N Heffernan 0-1, T Hayes 0-1, K Morris 0-1.	Referee: P Kelly (Ballinahinch)

7 September 2019 Round 3	Moycarkey-Borris	1-19 - 1-16	Borris-Ileigh	Holycross
	A McKelvey 0-5, M Hackett 1-0, K Morris 0-2, K Cummins 0-1, J Power 0-1.		J Kelly 0-13, K Maher 1-0, M Stapleton 0-2, J Harkin 0-1.	Referee: N Cosgrave (Marlfield)

8 September 2019 Round 3	Clonoulty-Rossmore	0-19 - 1-18	Toomevara	The Ragg
	T Hammersley 0-8, D Quirke 0-4, C Bourke 0-2, C Hammersley 0-1, J O'Keeffe 0-1, P White 0-1, S Maher 0-1, J Hammersley 0-1.		M McCarthy 1-7, R Quirke 0-2, J Ryan 0-2, J McCarthy 0-2, K McCarthy 0-1, McLoughney 0-1, C Canning 0-1, J Delaney 0-1.	Referee: K Jordan (Thurles Gaels)

=== Group 3 ===
==== Table ====
Team	Matches				Score			Pts
Team	Pld	W	D	L	For	Against	Diff	Pts
Kilruane MacDonaghs	3	3	0	0	78	60	18	6
Éire Óg Annacarty	3	2	0	1	62	53	9	4
Thurles Sarsfields	3	1	0	2	60	66	-6	2
Killenaule	3	0	0	3	46	67	-21	0

==== Group 3 results ====
6 April 2019 Round 1	Thurles Sarsfields	0-15 - 0-24	Éire Óg Annacarty	Dundrum
	A McCormack 0-8, D Maher 0-2, R Maher 0-1, P Maher 0-1, P Bourke 0-1, C Stakelum 0-1, M McCormack 0-1.		A Griffin 0-9, C O'Brien 0-2, T Fox 0-2, D Crosse 0-2, D O'Dwyer 0-2, S Ryan 0-2, R O'Brien 0-1, E Bradshaw 0-1, D Mooney 0-1, P O'Dwyer 0-1.

7 April 2019 Round 1	Killenaule	1-18 - 2-17	Kilruane MacDonaghs	Templemore
	J O'Dwyer 0-7, T Keaveney 1-2, T Stakelum 0-3, M Doyle 0-2, J O'Dwyer 0-2, E Barry 0-1, D Guinan 0-1.		C Darcy 1-9, K O'Kelly 1-1, N O'Meara 0-2, M O'Neill 0-2, C Cleary 0-1, S Adams 0-1, D Peters 0-1.	Referee: S Everard (Moyne-Templetuohy)

1 September 2019 Round 2	Kilruane MacDonaghs	2-24 - 0-18	Thurles Sarsfields	Templetuohy
	C Darcy 1-15, C Cleary 1-3, K Cahill 0-2, S Adams 0-2, T Cleary 0-1, J Cahill 0-1.		A McCormack 0-9, C Lanigan 0-2, R Maher 0-2, C Stakelum 0-1, P Maher 0-1, T Doyle 0-1.	Referee: J McCormack (Knockavilla)

1 September 2019 Round 2	Éire Óg Annacarty	0-17 - 0-13	Killenaule	Boherlahan
	A Griffin 0-5, C Bradshaw 0-4, D Crosse 0-3, S Ryan 0-2, T Fox 0-2, C O'Brien 0-1.		J O'Dwyer 0-6, E Barry 0-6, T Keaveney 0-1.	Referee: P Carroll (Burgess)

7 September 2019 Round 3	Éire Óg Annacarty	2-15 - 2-19	Kilruane MacDonaghs	Templederry
	S Ryan 0-6, T Fox 1-1, R O'Doherty 1-0, P O'Dwyer 0-2, E Bradshaw 0-2, C O'Brien 0-1, P Devlin 0-1, D O'Dwyer 0-1, R O'Brien 0-1.		C Darcy 0-9, C Cleary 1-2, T Cleary 0-4, K O'Kelly 1-0, J Cahill 0-2, R McLoughney 0-1, W Cleary 0-1.	Referee: J Ryan (Boherlahan-Dualla)

8 September 2019 Round 3	Killenaule	0-12 - 1-24	Thurles Sarsfields	Boherlahan
	E Barry 0-6, M Doyle 0-3, K O'Dwyer 0-1, J O'Dwyer 0-1, T Doyle 0-1.		A McCormack 0-13, C Lanigan 1-2, S Cahill 0-3, C Stakelum 0-2, P Maher 0-2, R Maher 0-1, D Maher 0-1.

=== Group 4 ===
==== Table ====
Team	Matches				Score			Pts
Team	Pld	W	D	L	For	Against	Diff	Pts
Kiladangan	3	3	0	0	94	59	35	6
Drom-Inch	3	1	1	1	73	64	9	3
Roscrea	3	0	2	1	58	66	-8	2
Portroe	3	0	1	2	59	65	-6	1

==== Group 4 results ====
6 April 2019 Round 1	Kiladangan	2-23 - 0-20	Drom-Inch	Templederry
	J Gallagher 1-3, W Connors 0-6, B Seymour 1-2, T Gallagher 0-5, S Hayes 0-3, R Gleeson 0-2, P Flynn 0-2.		S Callanan 0-5, J Ryan 0-4, T Nolan 0-4, D Butler 0-3, A O'Meara 0-1, P Campion 0-1, D Collins 0-1, R Long 0-1.	Referee: G Fitzpatrick (Roscrea)

7 April 2019 Round 1	Roscrea	0-21 - 1-18	Portroe	Nenagh
	L Cashin 0-11, E Fitzpatrick 0-3, D Tynan 0-2, S Fletcher 0-2, J Fitzpatrick 0-1, C Sheedy 0-1, L Conlon 0-1.		J Sheedy 0-8, A Willis 1-1, R Mulrooney 0-3, M Gennery 0-2, R Byrne 0-2, J Ryan 0-1, K O'Halloran 0-1.	Referee: C Doyle (Silvermines)

1 September 2019 Round 2	Portroe	2-17 - 7-21	Kiladangan	Cloughjordan
	J Sheedy 1-8, K O'Halloran 0-4, M Gennery 1-0, AJ Willis 0-2, J Ryan 0-1, D Lumbroso 0-1.		T Gallagher 1-11, B Seymour 3-2, P Flynn 2-2, A Loughnane 1-0, A Flynn 0-2, J Gallagher 0-1, D Moran 0-1, D McGrath 0-1.	Referee: K Jordan (Thurles Gaels)

1 September 2019 Round 2	Drom-Inch	2-15 - 1-18	Roscrea	Templetuohy
	L Campion 1-1, S Callanan 0-4, T Nolan 1-0, J Ryan 0-3, M Campion 0-3, M Connors 0-3, S Nolan 0-2, F Purcell 0-1.		L Cashin 0-6, D Tynan 1-1, S Fletcher 0-4, E Fitzpatrick 0-3, C Booth 0-2, C Sheedy 0-1, J Fitzpatrick 0-1.	Referee: P Ivors (Ballingarry)

7 September 2019 Round 3	Portroe	1-12 - 2-26	Drom-Inch	Dolla
	J Sheedy 0-8, A Willis 1-0, M Gennery 0-1, J Ryan 0-1, R Byrne 0-1, K O'Halloran 0-1.		S Callanan 0-10, D Butler 1-3, T Nolan 1-3, M Connors 0-4, F Purcell 0-1, L Ryan 0-1, J Ryan 0-1, J Lupton 0-1, R Long 0-1, A O'Meara 0-1.	Referee: P Kelly (Ballinahinch)

7 September 2019 Round 3	Kiladangan	2-18 - 0-16	Roscrea	Dolla
	T Gallagher 0-13, B Seymour 2-0, W Connors 0-2, A Flynn 0-1, P Flynn 0-1, M Minehan 0-1.		L Cashin 0-10, E Fitzpatrick 0-5, S Fletcher 0-1.	Referee: M Murphy (Toomevara)

=== Knock-out stage ===
==== Relegation playoffs ====
6 October 2019 Relegation playoff	Moycarkey-Borris	3-19 - 2-16	Killenaule	Templetuohy
	K Morris (1-8, 0-7 frees), M Hackett (2-1), A McKelvey (0-3, 0-1 frees), K Cummins (0-3), J Morrissey (0-2), T Hayes (0-1), K Moran (0-1).	Report	J O'Dwyer (0-10, 0-8 frees), E Barry (1-1), G Browne (1-1), K Bergin (0-3), T Doyle (0-1).	Referee: F Horgan (Knockavilla)

6 October 2019 Relegation playoff	Burgess	1-18 - 1-16	Portroe	Dolla
	S Murray (0-9, 0-3 frees, 0-2 sidelines), D Ryan (1-1), J Mulqueen (0-2), B O’Flaherty (0-2), K Nealon (0-2, 0-1 frees), J O’Flaherty (0-1), T Dunne (0-1).	Report	J Sheedy (0-9, 0-9 frees), M Gennery (1-2), K O’Halloran (0-2), J Ryan (0-2), A Willis (0-1).	Referee: P Kelly (Ballinahinch)

==== Preliminary quarter-finals ====
6 October 2019 Preliminary quarter-final	Toomevara	1-24 - 2-19 (aet)	Mullinahone	Leahy Park, Cashel
	M McCarthy (1-8, 0-5 frees), J McLoughney (0-4, 0-3 frees), J Delaney (0-4), K McCarthy (0-3), R Quirke (0-2), J Ryan (0-1), J McCarthy (0-1), P Ryan (0-1).	Report	E Kelly (1-6, 0-5 frees), M O'Shea (1-2), G Horan (0-4), K Walzer (0-3), S Curran (0-1), M Keogh (0-1), E Keane (0-1), M Dunne (0-1).	Referee: J McCormcak (Knockavilla)

6 October 2019 Preliminary quarter-final	Loughmore-Castleiney	3-22 - 1-33 (aet)	Clonoulty-Rossmore	Littleton
	J McGrath (0-10, 0-8 frees, 0-1 '65), E Sweeney (2-1, 0-1 free), N McGrath (0-5, 0-1 frees), L McGrath (1-1), T McGrath (0-3), L Treacy (0-1), P Nyland (0-1).	Report	T Hammersley (0-19, 0-14 frees, 0-1 '65), S Maher (1-1), C Bourke (0-4), M Ryan (0-3), C Hammersley (0-2), D Quirke (0-2, 0-1 sideline), F O'Keeffe (0-1), T Butler (0-1).	Referee: N Cosgrave (Marlfield)

==== Quarter-finals ====
12 October 2019 Quarter-final	Nenagh Éire Óg	4-15 - 1-08	Éire Óg Annacarty	The Ragg, Bouladuff
	J Morris 2-2 (0-1 free); A Coffey 1-2; T Heffernan 0-4; M Heffernan 0-3; C Hennessy 1-0; P Murphy 0-2; D Quinn, A Healy 0-1 each.	Report	A Griffin 1-2 (0-1 free); R O'Brien, S Ryan 0-2 each; C Bradshaw, B Fox 0-1 each.

12 October 2019 Quarter-final	Kiladangan	3-12 - 1-12	Toomevara	MacDonagh Park, Cloughjordan
	B Seymour (0-4, 2 65s); W Connors, D O’Meara, J Gallagher (1-1 each); T Gallagher (0-2); B Hogan (pen), P Flynn, R Gleeson (0-1 each).	Report	M McCarthy (1-4, 4f); J McCarthy (0-3); P Ryan (0-2); Jason Ryan, Robbie Quirke, Russell Quirke (0-1 each).	Referee: P Kelly (Ballinahinch)

13 October 2019 Quarter-final	Borris-Ileigh	3-11 - 0-18	Drom-Inch	Holycross
	James Devaney (2-1), Kevin Maher (0-6, 0-5 frees), Kieran Maher (1-0), Jerry Kelly (0-2), Conor Kenny (0-2).	Report	S Callanan (0-11, 0-9 frees), J Ryan (0-2, 0-1 free), L Ryan (0-1), P Campion (0-1), F Purcell (0-1), D Butler (0-1), T Nolan (0-1).	Referee: F Horgan (Knockavilla)

13 October 2019 Quarter-final	Kilruane MacDonaghs	1-23 - 1-10	Clonoulty-Rossmore	Templetuohy
	C Darcy (1-6, 0-3 frees, 0-1 sideline); B O'Meara, K Cahill (0-3 each); N O'Meara, R McLoughney (1 '65), C Cleary, T Cleary (0-2 each); Justin Cahill, K O'Kelly, C Morgan (0-1 each).	Report	S Maher (1-1); T Hammersley (0-4 frees); John O'Keeffe, C Hammersley, Dillon Quirke, Tom Butler, Thomas Butler (0-1 each).	Referee: K Delahunty (Moyle Rovers)

==== Semi-finals ====
20 October 2019 Semi-final	Nenagh Éire Óg	1-15 - 3-12	Kiladangan	Semple Stadium, Thurles
	M Heffernan 0-7 (4 frees, 1 65); J Morris 1-2; P Murphy 0-3; P Hickey 0-2; T Heffernan 0-1.	Report	Willie Connors 0-6 (0-4f, 0-2 ’65), Paul Flynn 1-3, Joe Gallagher, Sean Hayes 1-0 each, Tadhg Gallagher 0-2, Billy Seymour 0-1 (0-1 sideline).	Referee: J McCormack (Knockavilla)

20 October 2019 Semi-final	Borris-Ileigh	0-16 - 0-15	Kilruane MacDonagh's	Semple Stadium, Thurles
	C Kelly 0-7; K Maher 0-5 (4 frees); B Maher 0-2 frees; JD Devaney, J Kelly (s-cut) 0-1 each.	Report	C Darcy 0-7 (5 frees); J Cahill, K Cahill, R McLoughney (1 free) 0-2 each; N O’Meara, C Cleary 0-1 each.	Referee: K Jordan (Thurles Gaels)

==== Final ====
3 November 2019 Final	Kiladangan	1-12 - 1-15	Borris-Ileigh	Semple Stadium, Thurles
	W Connors 0-7 (0-5f, 0-1 ’65, 0-1 sideline), D O’Meara 1-1, P Flynn 0-2, T Gallagher, A Loughnane 0-1 each.	Report	J Devaney 1-4, B Maher (0-2f), J Kelly, K Maher (0-3f) 0-3 each, D McCormack, N Kenny 0-1 each.	Referee: F Horgan (Knockavilla)

== Championship statistics ==
=== Top scorers ===
Top scorers overall

Rank	Player	Club	Tally	Total	Matches	Average
1	Cian Darcy	Kilruane MacDonaghs	3-46	55	5	11.00
2	Mark McCarthy	Toomevara	4-39	51	5	10.20
3	Stephen Murray	Burgess	2-44	50	4	12.50
4	Timmy Hammersley	Clonoulty-Rossmore	1-44	47	5	9.40
5	John Sheedy	Portroe	1-33	36	4	9.00
6	Jake Morris	Nenagh Éire Óg	5-18	33	5	6.60
7	Tadhg Gallagher	Kiladangan	1-29	32	3	10.66
8	John McGrath	Loughmore-Castleiney	3-22	31	4	7.75
9	Paudie Greene	Upperchurch-Drombane	0-30	30	3	10.00
9	Aidan McCormack	Thurles Sarsfields	0-30	30	3	10.00
9	Séamus Callanan	Drom-Inch	0-30	30	4	7.50
9	Michael Heffernan	Nenagh Éire Óg	0-30	30	5	6.00

Top scorers in a single game

Rank	Player	Club	Tally	Total	Opposition
1	Timmy Hammersley	Clonoulty-Rossmore	0-19	19	Loughmore-Castleiney
2	Cian Darcy	Kilruane MacDonaghs	1-15	18	Thurles Sarsfields
3	Stephen Murray	Burgess	1-14	17	Loughmore-Castleiney
4	Tadhg Gallagher	Killenaule	1-11	14	Portroe
5	Stephen Murray	Burgess	1-10	13	Upperchurch-Drombane
5	Jerry Kelly	Borris-Ileigh	0-13	13	Moycarkey-Borris
5	Aidan McCormack	Thurles Sarsfields	0-13	13	Nenagh Éire Óg
5	Tadhg Gallagher	Kiladangan	0-13	13	Roscrea
6	Mark McCarthy	Toomevara	1-09	12	Borris-Ileigh
6	Cian Darcy	Kilruane MacDonaghs	1-09	12	Killenaue
6	Kieran Morris	Moycarkey-Borris	0-12	12	Toomevara

=== Miscellaneous ===
- Borris-Ileigh win their first title since 1986.
