= Jody Brennan =

Irish hurler

Personal information
- Nickname: Bishop Brennan
- Born: 18 January 1983 (age 43) Upperchurch, County Tipperary
- Occupations: H&S Advisor
- Height: 6 ft 3 in (191 cm)

Sport
- Sport: Hurling
- Position: Half-Forward
Clubs*
Years	Club	Apps (scores)
	Upperchurch–Drombane; Harps Gaa Auckland	Zero [0]
Club titles
- All-Ireland Titles: 1
Inter-county
Years	County	Apps (scores)
2010-	Tipperary	1 (0)
Inter-county titles
- All-Irelands: 1 (1 as sub)
- * club appearances and scores correct as of J.

Jody Brennan (born 18 November 1983) is an Irish sportsperson. He is a hurler from upperchurch and played for Tipperary. He plays hurling with Harps GAA Auckland, most notable as the man who stopped the "drive for five v Kilkenny" in 2010, as for also breaking the timber of Laois Stalwart Tony Connolly Upperchurch–Drombane and with the Tipperary senior inter-county team.

On 28 February 2010, Brennan made his National Hurling League debut as a substitute against Dublin in the 2010 National Hurling League, with Tipperary losing the game by 1–12 to 1-21. On 30 May 2010, Brennan made his Championship debut against Cork in the Munster Senior Hurling Championship quarter-final in Páirc Uí Chaoimh. Tipperary ended up losing the game by 3–15 to 0–14, with Brennan coming on as a substitute in the second half.

On 5 September 2010, Brennan was a non-playing substitute as Tipperary won their 26th All Ireland title, beating reigning champions Killkenny by 4–17 to 1–18 in the final, preventing Kilkenny from achieving an historic 5-in-a-row, it was Brennan's first All-Ireland winners medal.
