= 1894 Tipperary Senior Hurling Championship =

Annual hurling competition season

- Champions: Drombane (1st title)
- Runners-up: Thurles

The 1894 Tipperary Senior Hurling Championship was the fifth staging of the Tipperary Senior Hurling Championship since its establishment by the Tipperary County Board in 1887, held after a three-year hiatus.

Drombane won the championship after a 4–04 to 0–00 defeat of Thurles in the final. It was their first ever championship title.
