= Hugh Maloney =

Irish hurler

Personal information
- Native name: Aodh Ó Maolomhnaigh (Irish)
- Born: 1 July 1983 (age 43) Nenagh, County Tipperary
- Occupation: Accountant
- Height: 6 ft 0 in (183 cm)

Sport
- Sport: Hurling
- Position: Left wing-back
Club
- Years: Club
- Nenagh Éire Óg
Inter-county
Years	County	Apps (scores)
2005-2010	Tipperary	18 (0-5)
Inter-county titles
- Munster titles: 2 (as sub)
- All-Irelands: 1 (as sub)
- NHL: 1

Hugh Maloney (born 1 July 1983) is an Irish sportsperson. He plays hurling with his local club Nenagh Éire Óg and with the Tipperary senior inter-county team.

In 2009, he was in the team that was runners-up in the All-Ireland Senior Hurling Championship.

== Early life ==
Hugh Maloney was born in Nenagh, County Tipperary in 1983. He was educated locally and from a young age he showed a great interest in hurling. Maloney later attended the Waterford Institute of Technology. Here his hurling skills came to the fore when he won three Fitzgibbon Cup titles in 2003, 2004 and 2006 when he was joint captain.

== Playing career ==
=== Club ===
Maloney plays his club hurling with his local Nenagh Éire Óg club. He has enjoyed much success at underage levels, beginning in the mid-1990s when he won a North Tipperary under-14 hurling medal. Maloney later won a North Tipp Junior Hurling medal in 2000 and a County Junior Hurling medal that same year. In 2001 he added a Munster Junior Club Hurling medal as well as a North Tipperary Senior Hurling medal. In 2009 he captained eire og to another north senior title. in 2013 he was an inspirational character at centre back in which his club reached a first county final in seven years but lost out by the narrowest of margins.

=== Inter-county ===
Maloney's hurling skills were quickly spotted by the inter-county selectors and he soon joined the Tipperary minor hurling team. He won a Munster minor medal in 2001 and played at wing-back on the Tipperary team which won the Munster under-21 hurling title in 2003. Maloney later joined the Tipperary senior hurling team, making his debut in the Munster Championship against Clare. Since then he has played in two Munster finals without success.

On 5 September 2010, Maloney was a non-playing substitute as Tipperary won their 26th All Ireland title, beating reigning champions Killkenny by 4–17 to 1–18 in the final, preventing Kilkenny from achieving an historic 5-in-a-row, it was Maloney's first All-Ireland winners medal.
