= Upperchurch =

Village in County Tipperary, Ireland

Upperchurch An Teampall Uachtarach
- Village
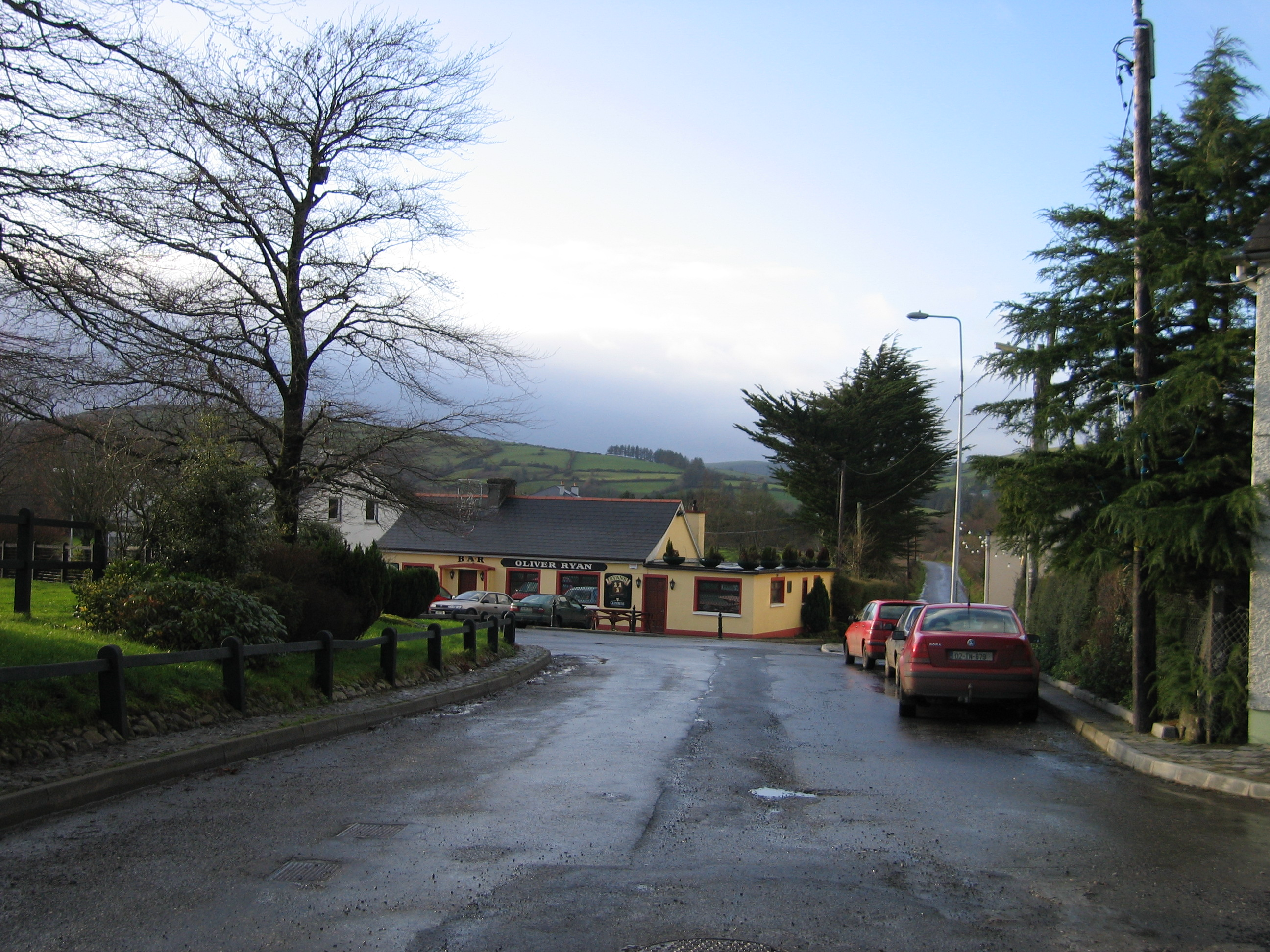

- Location in Ireland
- Coordinates: 52°42′10″N 8°01′10″W
- Country: Ireland
- Province: Munster
- County: County Tipperary

Population (2006)
  - Total: 314
- Time zone: UTC+0 (WET)
  - Summer (DST): UTC-1 (IST (WEST))

Upperchurch (Irish: An Teampall Uachtarach, meaning 'the upper church') is a small village in County Tipperary, Ireland. It lies in the Slievefelim Hills, just off the R503 regional road between Thurles and Limerick. Its Irish name was historically anglicised as Templeoughteragh, Templeoughtragh and Templeoughtera. It is a civil parish in the historical barony of Kilnamanagh Upper.

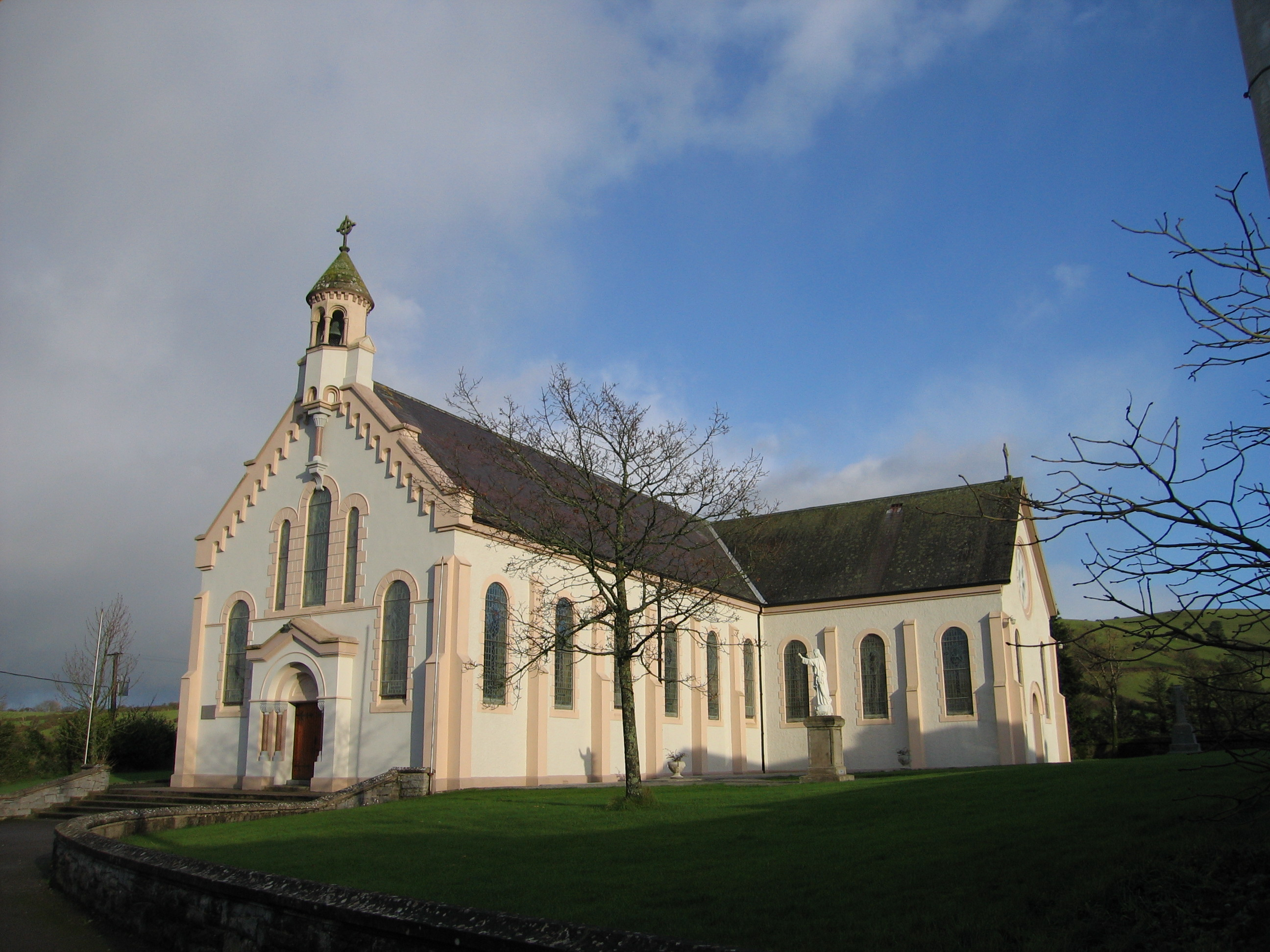
Sacred Heart Church

== Sport ==
Upperchurch–Drombane GAA is the local Gaelic Athletic Association club. Clodiagh Rangers F.C is the local soccer club.

== See also ==
- List of civil parishes of County Tipperary
- List of towns and villages in the Republic of Ireland
