= Patrick (Pa) Bourke =

Irish sportsperson

Patrick Bourke
Personal information
- Native name: Pádraig de Búrca (Irish)
- Nickname: Pa
- Born: 18 May 1988 (age 38) Thurles, County Tipperary, Ireland
- Occupation: Carpenter
- Height: 6 ft 0 in (183 cm)

Sport
- Sport: Hurling
- Position: Right wing-forward
Club
- Years: Club
- 2005-present: Thurles Sarsfields
Club titles
- Tipperary titles: 6
Inter-county*
Years	County	Apps (scores)
2007-present	Tipperary	18 (3-35)
Inter-county titles
- Munster titles: 2
- All-Irelands: 1
- NHL: 0
- All Stars: 0
- *Inter County team apps and scores correct as of 20:38, 7 June 2012.

Patrick "Pa" Bourke (born 18 May 1988 in Thurles, County Tipperary) is an Irish sportsperson. He plays hurling with his local club Thurles Sarsfields and with the Tipperary senior inter-county team.

== Early life ==
Pa Bourke was born in Thurles, County Tipperary in 1988. He was born into a family steeped in hurling history as his grandfather, John Maher, captained Tipperary to the All-Ireland title in 1945, having already won senior All-Ireland medals as far back as 1930 and 1937. Bourke was educated locally at Thurles CBS, where his hurling skills were first developed. He was a key member of the team in 2005 when his school were defeated by St. Flannans of Ennis in the final of the Dr. Harty Cup.

== Playing career ==
=== Club ===
Bourke plays his club hurling with the famous Thurles Sarsfields club in his home town and has enjoyed some success. He first came to prominence as a dual player at minor level. Bourke had little success on the minor hurling field; however, he won back-to-back minor football titles in 2005 and 2006. His performance in the latter final earned him the Man of the Match title. Bourke has since moved onto the club's under-21 and senior teams. Pa won his second county championship medal in 2009 with a starring role for the team in their victory over neighbours Drom & Inch. In 2010 Sarsfields defeated Toomevara in the county semi final with Bourke scoring a crucial last minute goal to sicken the former champions. Bourke suffered a minor injury to the calf three weeks later whilst on vacation in Corfu.

=== Inter-county ===
Bourke first came to prominence on the inter-county scene as a member of the Tipperary minor hurling team in 2005, however, he had little success in his first year. Cork defeated Tipp in the Munster final in 2006, however, Tipp still qualified for the All-Ireland final. On that occasion Tipp defeated Galway giving Bourke an All-Ireland Minor Hurling Championship medal. Bourke also finished the championship as the top scorers after recording a respectable 3 goals and 35 points in only a handful of games. He made his senior debut in 2007, however, it was an unhappy year for Tipperary's senior hurling team. Bourke returned to the substitute's bench for Tipp's National Hurling League triumph in 2008. Pa is still enjoying success at club level and recently scored 6.3 earning him man of the match against Loughmore in the Mid Tipperary Senior hurling final.

On 5 September 2010, Bourke was a non-playing substitute as Tipperary won their 26th All Ireland title, beating reigning champions Killkenny by 4–17 to 1–18 in the final, preventing Kilkenny from achieving an historic 5-in-a-row, it was Bourke's first All-Ireland winners medal.

== Career statistics ==
=== Club ===
As of match played 29 October 2017.

Team	Year	Munster		All-Ireland		Total	
Team	Year	Apps	Score	Apps	Score	Apps	Score
Thurles Sarsfields	2005–06	2	0-02	0	0-00	2	0-02
Thurles Sarsfields	2009–10	1	1-05	0	0-00	1	1-05
Thurles Sarsfields	2010–11	2	0-07	0	0-00	2	0-07
Thurles Sarsfields	2012–13	3	1-19	1	1-05	4	2-24
Thurles Sarsfields	2014–15	1	0-08	0	0-00	1	0-08
Thurles Sarsfields	2015–16	1	0-08	0	0-00	1	0-08
Thurles Sarsfields	2016–17	2	0-16	0	0-00	2	0-16
Thurles Sarsfields	2017–18	1	0-02	0	0-00	1	0-02
Total		13	2-67	1	1-05	14	3-72
