= Bouladuff =

Bouladuff An Bhuaile Dhubh
- Village
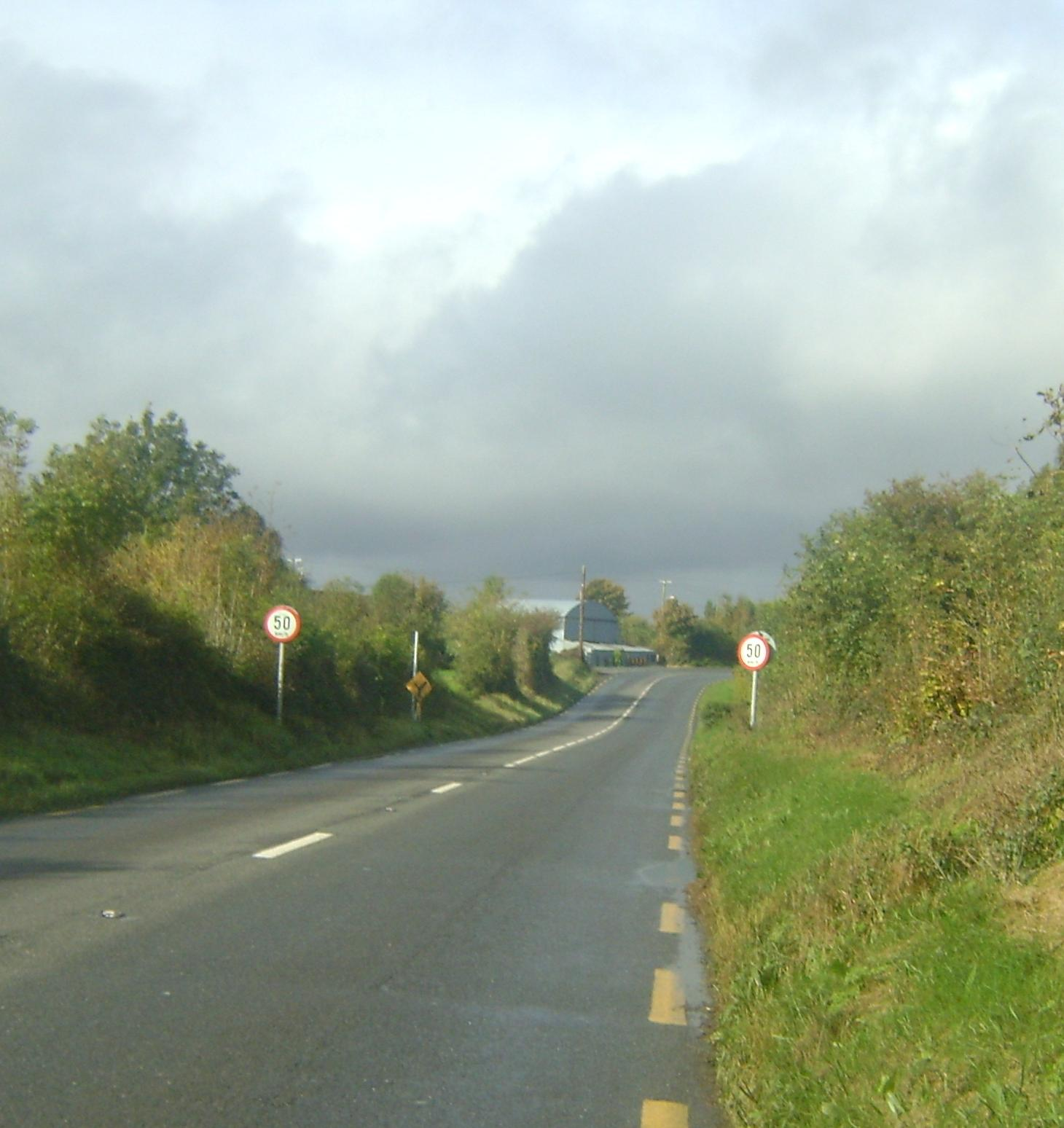
- Entrance to Bouladuff R498

- Location in Ireland
- Coordinates: 52°43′02″N 7°54′40″W
- Country: Ireland
- Province: Munster
- County: County Tipperary

Population (2016)
  - Total: 395
- (Inch Electoral Division)

Bouladuff (Irish: An Bhuaile Dhubh), also known as Inch and The Ragg, is a village near Thurles in County Tipperary, Ireland. According to the 2016 CSO census, the population of the Inch electoral division was 395. Bouladuff is in the barony of Eliogarty.

== Location and access ==
Bouladuff (also known as Inch) lies 5 miles from Thurles and 3 miles from Borrisoleigh. The village is set in the Suir valley and bounded by the Silvermine Mountains to the northwest and the Slieveardagh hills to the Southeast. The main road is the R498 regional road from Nenagh to Thurles. The area around Bouladuff has views of the Devils Bit and Tower mountains.

== Amenities ==
Amenities in the area include Inch National school, Inch Community Hall, and Inch Church (the latter 200 years old).

The village is served by a nightclub and bar, a petrol station and shop, and a restaurant.

The GAA grounds of Drom-Inch GAA club have dressing room facilities and a covered stand.

== See also ==
- List of towns and villages in Ireland

== Gallery ==
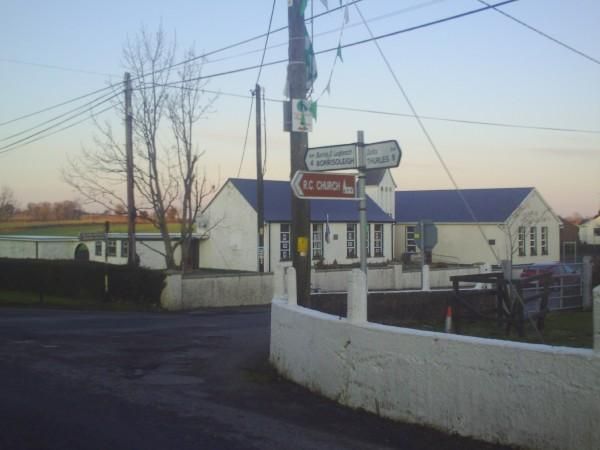
Inch National School

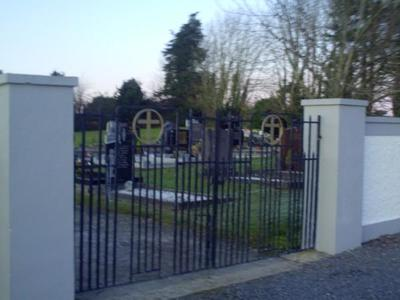
Bouladuff Cemetery

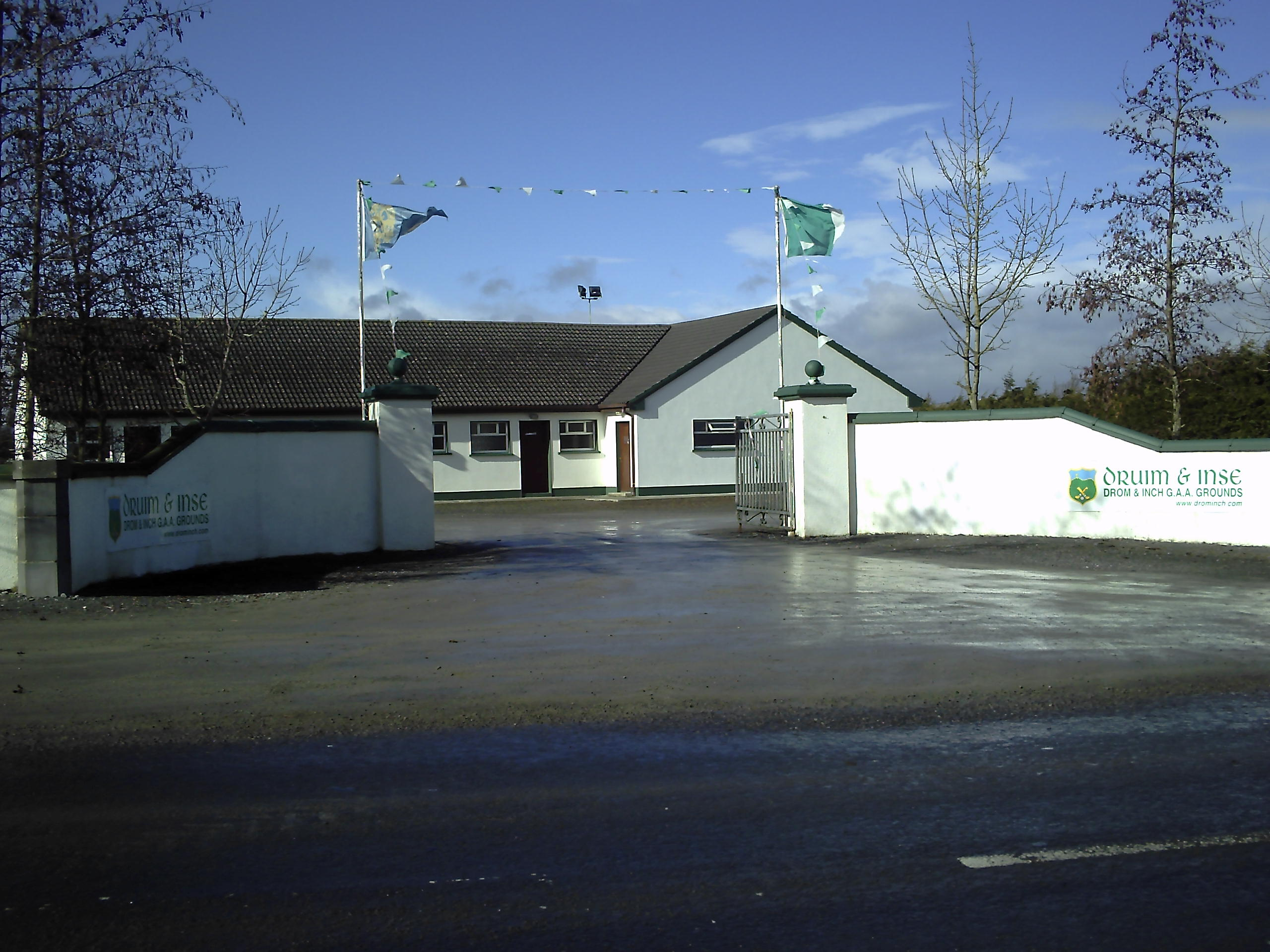
Drom and Inch GAA Club Bouladuff
