= Nenagh Éire Óg GAA =

Gaelic games club in County Tipperary, Ireland

Nenagh Éire Óg
- Éire Óg An tAonach
- Founded: 1947
- County: Tipperary
- Colours: Sky Blue and Navy Blue
- Grounds: MacDonagh Park
- Coordinates: 52°52′03″N 8°12′51″W

Playing kits
Standard colours

Senior Club Championships
	All Ireland	{{{province}}} champions	Tipperary champions
Hurling:	-	-	1

Nenagh Éire Óg GAA is a Tipperary GAA club which is located in County Tipperary, Ireland. Both hurling and Gaelic football are played in the North-Tipperary divisional competitions. The club is centred on the town of Nenagh.

== Honours ==
- Tipperary Senior Football Championship Winners in 1911 and 1915 (Nenagh Institute)
- Tipperary Senior Hurling Championship winners in 1995
- Munster Senior Club Hurling Championship finalists in 1995 where they were beaten by Sixmilebridge.

=== Roll of honour ===
Divisional Championships – 180 titles

- North Tipperary Senior Hurling Championship (10) 1915, 1957, 1964, 1992, 1993, 1998, 2001, 2009, 2014, 2022, 2023
- North Tipperary Under-21 A Hurling Championship(7) 1979, 1980, 1981, 1982, 1993, 1994, 2015
- North Tipperary Minor A Hurling Championship (21) 1938, 1947 (as St. Mary's), 1948 (as St. Mary's), 1949 (as St. Mary's), 1951 (as St. Mary's), 1953, 1955, 1969, 1977, 1978, 1979, 1989, 1991, 1992, 2007, 2008, 2009, 2010, 2011, 2012, 2013
- North Intermediate Hurling Championship (1) 1947 (as St. Mary's)
- North Tipperary Junior A Hurling Championship (7) 1983, 1999, 2000, 2009, 2012, 2014, 2021
- North Tipperary Junior B Hurling Championship (1) 1994
- North Tipperary Junior C Hurling Championship (2) 2010, 2020
- North Tipperary Senior Football Championship (6) 1989, 1991, 1992, 1994, 1995, 1998
- North Intermediate Football Championship (4) 1974, 1988, 1996, 1997
- North Tipperary Junior A Football Championship (5) 1962, 1974, 1985, 1986, 2010
- North Tipperary Junior B Football Championship (1) 2021
- North Tipperary Under 21 A Football Championship (12) 1981, 1983, 1984, 1987, 1988, 1989, 1990, 1991, 1992, 1993, 1994, 2009, 2015
- North Tipperary Under 19 B Football Championship (1) 2022
- North Tipperary Minor A Football Championship (11) 1977, 1983, 1986, 1988, 1989, 1990, 1991, 1992, 1993, 1994, 2025

County Titles – 47 titles

- Tipperary Senior Football Championship (2) 1911, 1915 (Nenagh Institute)
- Tipperary Senior Hurling Championship (1) 1995
- Tipperary Intermediate Football Championship (2) 1988, 1997
- Tipperary Intermediate Hurling Championship (1) 1947 (St Mary's)
- Tipperary Junior A Hurling Championship (3) 1947, 1983, 2000
- Tipperary Junior A Football Championship (1) 1986, 2010
- Tipperary Junior B Football Championship (1) 2021
- Tipperary Under-21 A Hurling Championship (5) 1979, 1980, 1981, 1982, 1993
- Tipperary Under-21 A Football Championship (2) 1991, 1993
- Tipperary Minor A Hurling Championship (8) 1969, 1977, 1978, 1991, 1992, 2008, 2012, 2013
- Tipperary Minor A Football Championship (1) 1990

All-Ireland Titles – 3 titles

- All Ireland 7 a side champions 1998, 2008
- All Ireland Community games champions 2018

== Club players who have won All-Ireland medals ==
Senior Hurling

- John McGrath 1958
- Mick Burns 1958, 1961, 1962, 1964, 1965
- Michael Cleary 1989, 1991
- Conor O'Donovan 1989, 1991
- John Heffernan 1989
- Hugh Maloney 2010
- Michael Heffernan 2010
- Barry Heffernan 2016
- Daire Quinn 2016
- Barry Heffernan 2019
- Jake Morris 2019, 2025
- Sam O'Farrell 2025

In addition Michael Cleary also won four consecutive All-Stars between 1990 and 1993.

Intermediate Hurling

- Paddy Hallinan 1963
- Michael Kearns 1963
- Michael Heffernan 2012

Junior Football

- Chris Bonnar 1998
- Kevin Coonan 1998
- Jim McAuliffe 1998

North Tipperary – Hurlers' of the Year

- Conor O'Donovan 1987 SH
- Michael Cleary 1989 SH
- Kevin Tucker 1993 SH
- Eddie Tucker 1995 SH
- John Heffernan 2001 JH
- Hugh Moloney 2004 SH, 2007 SH
- Michael Heffernan 2007 MH
- Niall Madden 2011 JH
- Donnacha Quinn 2012, 2013 MH
- Daire Quinn 2014 SH
- Alan Kelly 2014 JH
