= Upperchurch–Drombane GAA =

Gaelic games club in County Tipperary, Ireland

Upperchurch–Drombane
- Teampall Uachtarach–An Drom Bán
- County: Tipperary
- Nickname: The Church
- Colours
- Grounds: Drombane Grounds
- Coordinates: 52.660637°N 7.952299°W

Playing kits
Standard colours

Senior Club Championships
	All Ireland	Munster champions	Tipperary champions
Hurling:	0	0	1

Upperchurch–Drombane GAA is a Gaelic Athletic Association club in the areas of Upperchurch and Drombane, County Tipperary, Ireland. The club fields teams in both hurling and Gaelic football. The club is a member of Mid Tipperary GAA.

== History ==
Located in the Upperchurch and Drombane area, about 8 miles outside Thurles, Upperchurch–Drombane GAA Club began as two separate clubs in 1886. The first 50 years of the Gaelic Athletic Association saw the existence of various teams in the parish, with both Drombane and Upperchurch playing separately and also being involved in different amalgamations at different times, calling themselves Clodiagh Rangers. Drombane beat Thurles to win the Tipperary SHC title in 1894.

By 1933, Upperchurch and Drombane had joined forces as a single club and won the first of six Mid Tipperary JAHC titles. The club claimed three Mid Tipperary IHC titles between 1991 and 1998, the last of which was subsequently converted into the club's first Tipperary IHC title and senior status for the first time ever.

Upperchurch–Drombane also won four Mid Tipperary JAFC titles during this period, before winning its sole Tipperary JAFC title in 2002. Several Mid Tipperary IFC titles were later won, with Upperchurch–Drombane also winning their first Tipperary IFC title in 2015. A decade later in 2025, Upperchurch–Drombane secured senior hurling status once again, after beating Carrick Swans to claim the Tipperary PIHC title. The club later claimed the Munster Club IHC title, following a 3–20 to 0–15 win over O'Callaghan's Mills in the final.

== Honours ==
- Munster Intermediate Club Hurling Championship (1) 2025
- Tipperary Senior Hurling Championship (1): 1894 (as Drombane)
- Tipperary Premier Intermediate Hurling Championship (1) 2025
- Tipperary Intermediate Football Championship (1): 2015
- Tipperary Intermediate Hurling Championship (1) 1998
- Tipperary Junior B Hurling Championship (1) 2016
- Tipperary Under-21 B Football Championship (1) 2015
- Tipperary Under-21 B Hurling Championship (2) 2007, 2012
- Tipperary Minor B Football Championship (2) 2007, 2013
- Mid Tipperary Intermediate Football Championship (6) 1977, 2007, 2008, 2013, 2014, 2015
- Mid Tipperary Intermediate Hurling Championship (3) 1991, 1993, 1998
- Mid Tipperary Junior A Football Championship (4) 1990, 1991, 2001, 2002
- Mid Tipperary Junior A Hurling Championship (6) 1933, 1950, 1966, 1976, 1977, 1996
- Mid Tipperary Junior B Football Championship (2) 2006, 2008
- Mid Tipperary Junior B Hurling Championship (2) 1994, 2016
- Mid Tipperary Under-21 A Football Championship: (1) 2022
- Mid Tipperary Under-21 B Football Championship (9) 1989, 1995, 2000, 2001, 2006, 2008, 2013, 2014, 2015
- Mid Tipperary Under-21 B Hurling Championship (7) 1989, 1992, 1995, 2005, 2007, 2012, 2015
- Mid Tipperary Minor B Football Championship (4) 2007, 2013, 2014, 2016
- Mid Tipperary Minor A Hurling Championship (1) 2008
- Mid Tipperary Minor B Hurling Championship (1) 2006
- Mid Tipperary Minor C Hurling Championship (1) 1996

== Notable players ==
- James Barry: All-Ireland SHC–winner (2016, 2019)
- Jody Brennan: All-Ireland SHC–winner (2010)
- Michael Ryan: All-Ireland SHC–winning manager (2016)
