= 2023 Tipperary county hurling team season =

Hurling (sport) season

- Team: Tipperary county
- Manager: Liam Cahill
- Captain: Noel McGrath
- All-Ireland SHC: Quarter-Final
- Munster SHC: 3rd in Group Stage
- National League: Semi-finalists
- Top scorer Championship: Jason Forde (4-31)
- Highest SHC attendance: 37,459 (v Limerick 21 May)
- Lowest SHC attendance: 9,962 (v Offaly 17 June)
- Standard Kit

The 2023 season was Liam Cahill's first year as manager of the Tipperary senior hurling team, having been appointed on 18 July 2022 on a three year term.

On 13 July 2022, the Tipperary management committee had relieved Colm Bonnar from his duties as Tipperary senior hurling manager after one year in charge with Liam Cahill named as the new manager five days later.

The team were sponsored for the second year by financial services technology solutions company Fiserv.

On 15 November 2022, Noel McGrath was named as the new captain of the team with 2022 captain Ronan Maher as vice-captain.

The 7-38 scored by Tipperary against Offaly on 17 June in the All-Ireland preliminary quarter-final, equivalent to 59 points, is the highest score ever recorded in a SHC game. The aggregate score, 86 points in total, is also an all-time record.

== 2023 senior hurling management team ==
On 23 July 2022, Liam Cahill named former Tipperary captain Pádraic Maher as a selector with Toomevara's Michael Bevans as coach. Loughmore Castleiney's Declan Laffan and Clonoulty Rossmore's TJ Ryan were also named as selectors On 15 November 2022, former Waterford player Tony Browne was also named as coaching support after previously working alongside Cahill with Waterford.

=== 2023 squad ===
On 14 November 2022, Liam Cahill announced his panel for pre-season and the upcoming National League, a total of 25 clubs were represented. Former All-Star goalkeeper Brian Hogan was not included as he is going travelling during the year. John O'Dwyer, who missed the 2022 campaign due to a knee injury was also omitted from the panel and later announced his retirement from inter-county hurling on 16 February. Niall O'Meara and Bryan O'Meara returned to the panel after travelling in 2022. Shane Neville, now playing for Cratloe in Clare, was the only player based outside the county to be included. The team returned to training on 24 November.

- Cathal Barrett (Holycross Ballycahill)
- Conor Bowe (Moyne Templetuohy)
- Michael Breen (Ballina)
- Ger Browne (Cashel King Cormacs)
- Paddy Cadell (JK Brackens)
- Seamus Callanan (Drom & Inch)
- John Campion (Drom & Inch)
- Pauric Campion (Drom & Inch)
- Ciaran Connolly (Loughmore Castleiney)
- Eoghan Connolly (Loughmore Castleiney)
- Paddy Creedon (Thurles Sarsfields)
- Joe Fogarty (Moneygall)
- Jason Forde (Silvermines)
- Enda Heffernan (Clonoulty Rossmore)
- Barry Hogan (Kiladangan)
- Seamus Kennedy (St Mary's)
- Mark Kehoe (Kilsheelan Kilcash)
- Patrick Maher (Lorrha Dorrha)
- Ronan Maher (Thurles Sarsfields)
- Jake Morris (Nenagh Eire Og)
- Conor McCarthy (Nenagh Eire Og)
- Dan McCormack (Borris Ileigh)
- Brian McGrath (Loughmore Castleiney)
- John McGrath (Loughmore Castleiney)
- Noel McGrath (Loughmore Castleiney)
- Shane Neville (Cratloe, Clare)
- Andrew Ormond (JK Brackens)
- Gearoid O'Connor (Moyne Templetuohy)
- Cian O'Dwyer (Clonakenny)
- Kian O'Kelly (Kilruane MacDonaghs)
- Bryan O'Mara (Holycross Ballycahill)
- Niall O'Meara (Kilruane MacDonaghs)
- James Quigley (Kiladangan)
- Gavin Ryan (Upperchurch Drombane)
- Jack Ryan (Clonoulty Rossmore)
- Johnny Ryan (Arravale Rovers)
- Sean Ryan (Templederry Kenyons)
- Rhys Shelly (Moycarkey-Borris)
- Conor Stakelum (Thurles Sarsfields)
- Alan Tynan (Roscrea)

The following players made their competitive senior debut in 2023.

- Johnny Ryan against Laois on 4 February.
- Sean Ryan against Laois on 4 February.
- Cian O'Dwyer against Laois on 4 February.
- John Campion against Laois on 4 February.
- Pauric Campion against Kilkenny on 12 February.
- Alan Tynan against Kilkenny on 12 February.
- Conor McCarthy against Dublin on 25 February.
- Rhys Shelly against Waterford on 11 March.
- Joe Fogarty against Antrim on 19 March.
- Kian O'Kelly against Antrim on 19 March.
- Paddy Creedon against Antrim on 19 March.
- Jack Ryan against Galway on 24 June.

== 2023 Munster Senior Hurling League ==
=== Summary ===
The Co-Op Superstores Munster Senior Hurling League began in early January. Tipperary played Waterford in their first match of the year on 3 January, There were first starts for Rhys Shelly in goal, Gavin Ryan, Pauric Campion, Shane Neville, Alan Tynan, Joe Fogarty, and Paddy Creedon. They lost out on a 0-21 to 1-15 scoreline. On the 8 January Liam Cahill secured his first win as Tipperary manager when they played Clare in their second match of the Munster Senior Hurling League, winning by 2-22 to 0-20. It was a first win for Tipperary since their League victory against Antrim in March 2022. Tipperary qualified for the final due to Clare defeating Waterford by 1-24 to 2-18 on 15 January.

The final against Cork was played on 21 January at Páirc Uí Rinn in front of 4,727. Tipperary had a lead of six with four minutes of regulation time remaining having previous had an eight point lead in the 52nd minute, but ended up losing by one point on a 1-19 to 3-14 scoreline after late Cork goals by Brian Hayes and Jack O’Connor. Seán Ryan got the only goal for Tipperay in the 25th minute with a low shot to the net from the left after a one-two with Conor Stakelum, they had a 1-9 to 1-6 lead at half-time. John McGrath returned for Tipperary from an achilles tendon rupture he suffered in April 2022 with his brother Brian McGrath named as the man of the match.

=== Results ===
3 January
19:30
Munster Senior Hurling League Group A

Waterford	0–21 – 1–15	Tipperary
Reuben Halloran (0-7, 6 frees, 1 65); S Walsh, C Dunford, Paudie Fitzgerald (0-2 each); B Nolan (free), M Fitzgerald, P Leavey, DJ Foran, B Power, I Daly, C Daly, A Gleeson (0-1 each).	Report Shelly; C Barrett, M Breen, G Ryan; D McCormack, P Campion, S Neville; P Cadell, G Browne; A Tynan, J Forde, J Fogarty; C Bowe, M Kehoe, P Creedon; Subs: C Stakelum for Fogarty (27), C O’Dwyer for Tynan (45), Johnny Ryan for Browne (45), Jack Ryan for Creedon (45), S Kennedy for Bowe (62), G O’Connor for Kehoe (70).	J Forde (1-11, 0-6 frees, 0-1 65); C O’Dwyer (0-2); A Tynan, C Bowe (0-1 each).

Mallow
Referee: J O’Halloran (Limerick)
8 January
13:30
Munster Senior Hurling League Group A

Tipperary	2–22 – 0–20	Clare
G O’Connor (0-8, 6 frees, 1 65); J Forde 1-3 (1-1 pens); S Ryan (1-1); C Stakelum (0-2); B Hogan (free), E Heffernan, S Kennedy, A Tynan, J Morris, M Kehoe, C O’Dwyer, Johnny Ryan (0-1 each).	Report Barry Hogan; J Quigley, M Breen, Gavin Ryan; E Heffernan, B O’Mara, B McGrath; P Cadell, C Stakelum; S Kennedy, Gearóid O’Connor, Alan Tynan; J Morris, M Kehoe, Sean Ryan. Subs: C McCarthy for G Ryan (h-t), J Forde for Kehoe (48), C O’Dwyer for Tynan (55), Johnny Ryan for Cadell (55), C Bowe for Morris (62), J Campion for Stakelum (66), Jack Ryan for S Ryan (68). Black card: B O’Mara (28-35+3).	P Duggan (0-5, 3 frees, 1 pen); R Mounsey (0-4); D Conroy, M Rodgers, D Ryan (0-3 each); P Crotty, A McCarthy (0-1 each).

McDonagh Park, Nenagh
Referee: É Stapleton (Limerick)
22 January
15:00
Munster Senior Hurling League Final

Tipperary	1–19 – 3–14	Cork
Jason Forde 0-14 (9f), Seán Ryan 1-0, Brian McGrath 0-1, Conor Stakelum 0-1, Séamus Kennedy 0-1, Cian O’Dwyer 0-1, Conor Bowe 0-1.	Report R Shelly; C McCarthy, M Breen, C Barrett; E Heffernan, P Campion, B McGrath; D McCormack, C Stakelum; S Kennedy, J Forde, C O’Dwyer; C Bowe, P Maher, S Ryan; Subs: G Ryan for McCarthy (31 mins, inj); G Browne for Bowe (52); G O’Connor for Kennedy, J McGrath for P Maher (both 56); N McGrath for O’Dwyer (64); J Kelly for Ryan (64); J Ryan for Stakelum (66).	Patrick Horgan 1-6 (0-6f), Jack O’Connor 1-1, Brian Hayes 1-0, Patrick Collins 0-2 (2f), Brian Roche 0-2, Seán Twomey 0-1, Robbie O’Flynn 0-1, Conor Lehane 0-1.

Páirc Uí Rinn
Referee: É Stapleton (Limerick)

== 2023 National Hurling League ==
=== Summary ===
The National hurling league began in early February. Tipperary played Laois in the opening round on 4 February in Semple Stadium. The match saw manager Liam Cahill come up against his Ballingarry clubmate Willie Maher who is the Laois manager. The team was announced on 2 February. Liam Cahill named four league debutants in Johnny Ryan, Gearóid O’Connor, Cian O’Dwyer and Sean Ryan. In dry conditions Tipperary playing in navy jerseys had a 1-17 to 0-7 lead at half-time after dominating the first half, the goal coming from the 12th minute with a low shot to the net from Seamus Kennedy after a pass from Patrick Maher. Gearoid O'Connor got eight points in the first half and went on to get eleven points in total. Substitute Jake Morris got the second Tipperary goal near the end of the game with Tipperary going on to win by 20 points on a 2-32 to 0-18 score-line. In total they had 14 different scorers from play during the game with 18 wides.

A week later on 12 February, Tipperary played Kilkenny in the second round of the league in Nowlan Park. The match was shown live on TG4. Just six players from the previous game against Laois started with Séamus Callanan returning to the team for his first game since 2021. In dry conditions in front of a crowd of 10,458, Tipperary had a twelve point lead at half-time on a 2-13 to 0-7 scoreline. The Tipperary goals coming from Jason Forde in the 27th minute with a powerful shot to the left of the net rom the left after a hand pass from Séamus Callanan. A second goal arrived in the seven minutes of time added on in the first half, Jake Morris finishing the rebound low to the net after Conor Bowe's shot had been saved. Paddy Cadell and Cathal Barrett after colliding with his own player both went off injured in the opening twelve minutes of the match. In the second-half Kilkenny narrowed the lead to four points before Tipperary pulled away again to win by six points on 2-24 to 1-21 scoreline, it was there first win in Nowlan park in 15 years. Jason Forde was named as the man of the match after scoring 1-15. Paddy Cadell who had gone off injured suffered a pivot shift injury to his left knee and will miss the rest of the season. Cathal Barrett who also went off during the game will be out for at least 10 to 12 weeks with a shoulder injury.

In round three of the league on 25 February, Tipperary played an unbeaten Dublin team at Croke Park with a Saturday evening start. It was Tipperary's first appearance at Croke Park since the 2019 All-Ireland final. There was seven changes to the starting team from the previous game against Kilkenny with Conor McCarthy, Bryan O’Mara, Brian McGrath, Conor Stakelum, Gearoid O’Connor, Seamus Kennedy and Mark Kehoe all coming into the team. In dry conditions Tipperary had a one point lead at half-time on a 0-14 to 0-13 scoreline. In the 40th minute second-half substitute Conor Bowe got a goal for Tipperary with a finish to the net from 10 yards out after a pass from Mark Kehoe. A second goal arrived in the 52nd minute from Jason Forde when he beat the Dublin goalkeeper to a long ball in and flicked to the net to put Tipperary into a six point lead. After that Tipperary eased to a five point win on a 2-23 to 0-24 score-line to maintain their 100% record with three wins out of three.

On 11 March Tipperary played Waterford in round four of the league at Semple Stadium. In dry conditions, Tipperary had a 1-12 to 0-11 at half-time. Jake Morris scored a goal for Tipperary in the 8th minute and in the second half he scored two more with low shots to the net as Tipperary won by 4-23 to 0-25. Morris became the first player to score a hat-trick of league goals for Tipperary against Waterford since 1965. With this win Tipperary clinched the top spot in Division 1B and a place in the semi-finals. Seamus Callanan picked up a knee injury in the first half and will be out of action for up to eight weeks.

A week later Tipperary travelled to Corrigan Park in Belfast to play Antrim in round five of the league. In dry conditions, Tipperary had a 3-13 to 0-8 at half-time and went on to win by 4-28 to 2-16 to complete five wins out of five in Division 1B of the league.

On 25 March Tipperary played Limerick in the semi-finals of the league in the Gaelic Grounds in front of 11,812. There were nine changes from the team that played in the previous match against Antrim. Limerick had finished in second place in Division 1 Group A behind Cork with a record of four wins and one loss which was against Cork. The match was shown live on TG4. Tipperary were five points clear in the 21st minute and had a four point lead at half-time on a 0-16 to 0-12 scoreline. Limerick drew level and went in front in the 46th minute with a point from Aaron Gillane. In the 57th minute Limerick scored the only goal of the game when Peter Casey kicked to the net from close range to extend the lead to six points. Limerick went on to win by six points on a 1-28 to 0-25 scoreline. Tipperary were outscored 1-16 to 0-9 in the second half. With this loss, Tipperary have now failed to beat Limerick in their last seven encounters with the last win coming in the 2019 Munster round robin.

=== Results ===
4 February
17:00
Round 1

Tipperary	2–32 – 0–18	Laois
Gearóid O’Connor 0-11 (7f, 1 65); Jake Morris 1-2; Séamus Kennedy 1-0; Conor Stakelum, Seán Ryan, Ronan Maher (1f) 0-3; Cian O’Dwyer, John McGrath 0-2; Cathal Barrett, Brian McGrath, Noel McGrath, Conor Bowe, John Campion, Mark Kehoe 0-1.	Report Barry Hogan; Cathal Barrett, Michael Breen, Johnny Ryan; Bryan O'Mara, Ronan Maher, Brian McGrath; Noel McGrath (c), Conor Stakelum; Seamus Kennedy, Gearoid O'Connor, Cian O'Dwyer; John McGrath, Patrick Maher, Sean Ryan; Subs: J Campion for Stakelum (37 inj), J Morris for O’Dwyer (51), M Kehoe for P Maher (51), P Cadell for N McGrath (60), C Bowe for J McGrath (62).	PJ Scully 0-6 (5f); Tomás Keyes 0-4; James Keyes 0-2; Ryan Mullaney, Fiachra C Fennell, Liam Senior, Ross King, Patrick Purcell, James Duggan 0-1.

Semple Stadium
Referee: Johnny Murphy (Limerick)
12 February
13:30
Round 2

Kilkenny	1–21 – 2–24	Tipperary
B. Drennan (0-10, 7 frees, 1 65); M. Keoghan (1-2); J. Donnelly (0-4); S. Walsh, B. Ryan, C. Fogarty, P. Walsh, W Walsh (0-1 each).	Report Barry Hogan; C. Barrett, M. Breen, Johnny Ryan; E. Heffernan, Pauric Campion, R. Maher; P. Cadell, D. McCormack; A. Tynan, N. McGrath (c), J. Morris; J. Forde, S. Callanan, C. Bowe; Subs: John Campion for P. Cadell (inj 5); E. Connolly for C. Barrett (temp 12-ft); S. Kennedy for J. Campion (temp 34-35+3); M. Kehoe for S. Callanan (53); B. O’Mara for P. Campion (54); S. Kennedy for A. Tynan (temp 56-58); S. Kennedy for J. Campion (61); S. Ryan for J. Morris (67).	J. Forde (1-15, 0-8 frees, 1 65, 1 sideline); J. Morris (1-2); C. Bowe, N. McGrath (0-2 each); A. Tynan, J. Campion, M. Kehoe (0-1 each).

Nowlan Park
Referee: P. Murphy (Carlow)
25 February
17:00
Round 3

Dublin	0–24 – 2–23	Tipperary
Donal Burke 0-14 (0-6f, 0-1 65), Alex Considine 0-3, Daire Gray 0-1, Conor Burke 0-1, Danny Sutcliffe 0-1, Chris O'Leary 0-1, Sean Currie 0-1, Joe Flanagan 0-1 (0-1f), Paul Crummey 0-1.	Report Barry Hogan; Conor McCarthy, Bryan O'Mara, Johnny Ryan; Michael Breen, Ronan Maher (c), Brian McGrath; Conor Stakelum, Dan McCormack; Alan Tynan, Gearoid O'Connor, Seamus Kennedy; Jason Forde, Jake Morris, Mark Kehoe; Subs: Noel McGrath for Brian McGrath 34, Conor Bowe for Stakelum h/t, Seamus Callanan for Kennedy 56, Patrick Maher for Forde 62, Cian O'Dwyer for O'Connor 68.	Jason Forde 1-10 (0-8f), Gearoid O'Connor 0-4 (0-2f), Conor Bowe 1-0, Mark Kehoe 0-3, Seamus Kennedy 0-2, Alan Tynan 0-2, Jake Morris 0-1, Brian McGrath 0-1.

Croke Park
Referee: Paud O'Dwyer (Carlow)
11 March
17:15
Round 4

Tipperary	4–23 – 0–25	Waterford
J Morris (3-0); G O’Connor (0-9, 8 frees); J Forde (0-6, 1 free); C Bowe (1-0); C Stakelum, M Kehoe (0-2 each); A Tynan, N McGrath, P Maher (0-1 each)	Report R Shelly; Johnny Ryan, M Breen, E Connolly; D McCormack, B O’Mara, R Maher; C Stakelum, A Tynan; G O’Connor, N McGrath (c), S Kennedy; J Morris, P Maher, S Callanan; Subs: M Kehoe for Callanan (20 inj), J Forde for Tynan (48), C Bowe for O’Connor (57), J McGrath for Bowe (67 inj), J Campion for N McGrath (69).	S Bennett (0-8 frees); C Lyons (0-4); J Prendergast, Patrick Fitzgerald (2 frees) (0-3 each); J Barron (0-2), I Daly, N Montgomery, D Hutchinson, C Dunford, Paudie Fitzgerald (0-1 each).

Semple Stadium
Referee: J Owens (Wexford)
19 March
13:45
Round 5

Antrim	2–17 – 4–28	Tipperary
Conal Cunning 0-5 (3fs, 1 65), Nigel Elliott 1-2, Rian McMullan 1-1, Michael Bradley 0-3, Paul Boyle 0-2, Seaan Elliott 0-1, Scott Walsh 0-1, Seamus McAuley 0-1	Report Rhys Shelly; Eoghan Connolly, Michael Breen, Bryan O’Mara; Enda Heffernan, Ronan Maher (c), Pauric Campion; Joe Fogarty, Alan Tynan; Kian O’Kelly, Mark Kehoe, Gearoid O’Connor; Conor Bowe, John McGrath, Sean Ryan; Subs: John Campion for Ronan Maher (26), Johnny Ryan for Bryan O’Mara (HT), Paddy Creedon for Kian O’Kelly (49), Dan McCormack for Alan Tynan (53), Cian O’Dwyer for Gearóid O’Connor (64).	Gearoid O’Connor 0-9 (7fs, 1 65), John McGrath 0-7 (1f), Sean Ryan 1-3, Mark Kehoe 1-0, Conor Bowe 1-0, Pauric Campion 1-0, Enda Heffernan 0-3, Alan Tynan 0-2, Joe Fogarty 0-2, Johnny Ryan 0-1, John Campion 0-1

Corrigan Park
Referee: Paud O'Dwyer (Carlow)
25 March
19:30
Semi-Final

Limerick	1–28 – 0–25	Tipperary
Aaron Gillane 0-7 (6fs), Diarmaid Byrnes 0-6 (5fs), Peter Casey 1-1, Cathal O’Neill, Declan Hannon, Tom Morrissey, Barry Murphy, and Cian Lynch 0-2 each, Donnacha Ó Dálaigh, Will O’Donoghue, Barry Nash, and Colin Coughlan 0-1 each.	Report Barry Hogan; Eoghan Connolly, Michael Breen, Johnny Ryan; Dan McCormack, Bryan O'Mara, Ronan Maher; Conor Stakelum, Alan Tynan; Seamus Kennedy, Noel McGrath (c), Gearóid O’Connor; Jason Forde, Patrick Maher, Jake Morris; Subs: Enda Heffernan for Stakelum, Mark Kehoe for Patrick Maher (both 51 minutes); John McGrath for Morris, Conor Bowe for Kennedy (65 minutes)	Jason Forde 0-14 (11fs) Alan Tynan 0-4, Gearoid O’Connor 0-3, Seamus Kennedy 0-2, Jake Morris, Noel McGrath, 0-1 each

Gaelic Grounds
Referee: Liam Gordon (Galway)

== 2023 Munster Senior Hurling Championship ==
The Munster Senior Hurling Championship started on Sunday 23 April with the first match against Clare in Ennis.

=== Round 1 (v Clare 23 April) ===
On Sunday 23 April Tipperary played Clare, managed by Brian Lohan in the first match of the Munster Championship at Cusack Park in Ennis. The match was televised live on GAAGO for €12, or as part of a season pass for €79. Tickets for the game cost €25 for the stand and €20 for the terrace. Commentary on the game was by Mike Finnerty. In Liam Cahill's first championship game in charge, he named a match-day squad listed in alphabetical order due to the team only being named after training on 21 April. Both Seamus Callanan and Niall O’Meara were missing from the squad due to injury. The starting team lined out with squad numbers and was named after training, the squad numbers also appeared in the match programme. All three McGrath brothers started for the first time in the championship with Brian McGrath starting for the first time alongside debutants Alan Tynan, Johnny Ryan, and Bryan O’Mara. Gearóid O'Connor also made his first start in the championship.

The match was played in front of a crowd of 17,971 on a dry day with occasional sun and rain drops. Tipperary playing with the wind into the east terrace end raced into a 1-3 lead after three minutes, the first goal coming from a Jason Forde sideline cut from the right in the 3rd minute that went all the way to the left corner of the net past Clare goalkeeper Eamonn Foudy from outside the 45-metre line. Clare then scored the next six points to be level in the 12th minute. Tipperary scored further goals when Foudy was dispossessed in possession by Jake Morris after 17 minutes who fired to the empty net. Morris got the third goal and his second after 23 minutes after another mistake by Foudy on a puck-out with Morris running in on goal from the left before firing low to the net. Mark Rodgers scored two goals for Clare before half-time, the first after catching a high ball before firing low to the left corner of the net and the second after clare ran at Tipperary before Rodgers fired to the net from close range. Tipperary had a 3-12 to 2-11 lead at half-time. In the second half, Tipperary were awarded a penalty in the 41st minute when Jake Morris was fouled by David McInerney as he ran in on goal with McInerney receiving a black card. Jason Forde scored the penalty low to the left corner of the net to put Tipperary into a six point lead. In the 63rd minute, substitute Sean Ryan, on his championship debut and with his first touch, got the fifth goal for Tipperary with a low shot from the left to the net. Clare scored a third goal in added time from Aidan McCarthy with Tipperary eventually easing to a five point win on a 5-22 to 3-23 scoreline. Jake Morris scored 2-4 during the game and was named as the man of the match. The win was the first in the championship for Tipperary since the win against Clare in July 2021 and ended a run of six successive defeats.

=== Round 2 (v Cork 6 May) ===
On Saturday 6 May Tipperary played Cork, managed by Pat Ryan in their second match of the Munster Championship at Páirc Uí Chaoimh in Cork. It was the 90th meeting of the two teams in the Championship. The match was televised live on GAAGO for €12, or as part of a season pass for €79. The live coverage was hosted by Grainne McElwain with analysis from John O'Dwyer and Eoin Cadogan. Commentary on the game was by Mike Finnerty alongside Séamus Hickey. Tickets for the game cost €25 for the stand and €20 for the terrace. Liam Cahill named his team on 4 May with Sean Ryan and Conor Stakelum coming into the starting team ahead of Brian McGrath and John McGrath.

The match was played in front of a crowd of 36,765 in dry sunny conditions. In the 5th minute Declan Dalton scored a goal for Cork when he ran in on goal before patting the ball to the net from the right to put Cork into a 1-2 to 0-1 lead. Tipperary came back into the game and scored 11 of the next 13 scores. Jason Forde tweaked his hamstring in scoring a point and had to go off after 16 minutes and will miss the rest of the Munster Championship. Cork got a second goal in the 34th minute when Robbie O'Flynn ran in on goal and finished to the right of the net from the left to make it 2-6 to 0-13. Tipperary had a two point lead at half-time on a 2-6 to 0-14 scoreline.

Playing into the sun at the city end in the second half, Gearoid O'Connor scored a goal in the 46th minute when he cut in from the left and back out again before firing to the net to put Tipperary into a 1-16 to 2-10 lead. Cork scored a third goal when Darragh Fitzgibbon finished the ball to the empty net after a pass along the ground from the left to cut the Tipperary lead to two points on a 3-15 to 1-23 scoreline. Cork scored the next two points to level the game before Mark Kehoe got a second goal for Tipperary in the 67th minute when he ran at goal from the left before finishing to the right of the net to put Tipperary back into a four point lead. Cork came back again and Brian Hayes got a fourth goal for Cork with a close range finish after a Shane Kingston pass from the left to level the match. Late Tipperary substitute Seamus Callanan had a shot at goal blocked before scoring a point with Shane Kingston then scoring to level score again in the third minute of added time with the game finishing as a draw on a 4-19 to 2-25 scoreline. Alan Tynan with four points from play was named as the man of the match.

=== Round 3 (v Limerick 21 May) ===
On Sunday 21 May Tipperary played All-Ireland Champions Limerick, managed by John Kiely in their third match of the Munster Championship at Semple Stadium in Thurles. The match was televised live on RTÉ 2 as part of the Sunday Game presented by Joanne Cantwell with analysis by Joe Canning, Anthony Daly and Dónal Óg Cusack. Commentary on the game was provided by Marty Morrissey alongside Michael Duignan. Tickets for the game cost €25 for the stand and €20 for the terrace. Liam Cahill named his team on 19 May with goalkeeper Rhys Shelly making his championship debut alongside fellow debutant Eoghan Connolly and Patrick Maher also coming into the team.

The match was played in front of a crowd of 37,459 in dry sunny conditions. Tipperary playing into the town end had the better of the first half and had a 0-15 to 0-12 lead at half-time with Gearoid O’Connor getting six points. Aaron Gillane had put Limerick into the lead in the first minute, with Noel McGrath slotting over a first-minute sideline to score for Tipperary. In the second half Limerick came back to lead by one point with four unanswered points before Tipperary again went into the lead. With the game into added time, Tom Morrissey put Limerick into the lead before substitute John McGrath who had only been on the pitch for a minute scored with a free in the 76th minute to level the match with a final scoreline of 0-25 to 0-25. Limerick were down to 14 men for the last few minutes of the match when Barry Nash was sent off. Tipperary manager Liam Cahill also received a red card late on after an incorrect line ball decision against Tipperary. Noel McGrath was named as the man of the match.

=== Round 4 (v Waterford 28 May) ===
On Sunday 28 May Tipperary played already eliminated Waterford, managed by Davy Fitzgerald in their fourth match of the Munster Championship at Semple Stadium in Thurles. A victory for Tipperary would qualify them for the Munster final against Clare. The match was televised live on GAAGO for €12, or as part of a season pass for €79. The live coverage was hosted by Grainne McElwain with analysis from John O'Dwyer and Eoin Cadogan. Commentary on the game was by Mike Finnerty alongside Séamus Hickey. Tickets for the game cost €25 for the stand and €20 for the terrace. Brian McGrath and Seamus Callanan started for Tipperary in place of Cathal Barrett and Jake Morris.

The match was played in front of a crowd of 20,832 in dry sunny conditions. Waterford led from the start against a flat Tipperary and had a 0-17 to 0-8 lead at half time (they also had eight wides in the first half) and went on to win the game by six points for their first win of the Championship. Dessie Hutchinson got the only goal of the game in the 52nd minute when he capitalized on a mistake by Rhys Shelly on a high ball to fire to the net from the right. Despite the loss Tipperary still progressed to the All-Ireland series but missed out on a place in the Munster final. Limerick defeated Cork by a point in the other match that was played at the same time, a draw in that match (the teams were level at half-time) would have eliminated Tipperary from the All-Ireland series on score difference, as anything greater that a four point loss if a draw would have eliminated Tipperary also.

Tipperary manager Liam Cahill speaking after the game said "I can't stress enough how disappointed we are for the Tipperary public today to witness a lot of basic errors on our behalf and it is something myself, Mikey, the management, and the players are really going to have to man up and get sorted out before we can say that we are serious All-Ireland contenders. We got rightly bet today. We got an awful hammering to be straight and honest about it."

=== Results ===
23 April
16:00
Round 1

Clare	3–23 – 5–22	Tipperary
Aidan McCarthy 1-13 (7fs, 2’65), Mark Rodgers 2-0, Ryan Taylor, Ian Galvin, Shane Meehan 0-2 each, Diarmuid Ryan, Tony Kelly, John Conlon, Robin Mounsey 0-1 each.	Report; Highlights Barry Hogan; Michael Breen, Cathal Barrett, Johnny Ryan; Brian McGrath, Ronan Maher, Bryan O’Mara; Dan McCormack, Alan Tynan; Seamus Kennedy, Noel McGrath (c), Gearoid O’Connor; Jake Morris, John McGrath, Jason Forde; Subs: Conor Stakelum for Tynan (45), Mark Kehoe for J. McGrath (58), Sean Ryan for O’Connor (63), Conor Bowe for N. McGrath (71), Enda Heffernan for B. McGrath (73)	Jason Forde 2-6 (1-0 Pen, 5fs, 1-1 sideline), Jake Morris 2-4, Sean Ryan 1-1, Noel McGrath 0-3, Gearoid O’Connor 0-2, Brian McGrath, Alan Tynan, John McGrath, Mark Kehoe, Seamus Kennedy, Conor Bowe 0-1 each.

Cusack Park, Ennis
Referee: Thomas Walsh (Waterford)
6 May
19:00
Round 2

Cork	4–19 – 2–25	Tipperary
Patrick Horgan 0-8 (5f, 2 65); Declan Dalton 1-2 (0-2f); Darragh Fitzgibbon 1-1; Robbie O'Flynn, Brian Hayes 1-0 each; Séamus Harnedy, Shane Kingston 0-3 each; Conor Lehane, Tim O’Mahony 0-1 each.	Report; Highlights Barry Hogan; Michael Breen, Cathal Barrett, Johnny Ryan; Bryan O’Mara, Ronan Maher, Dan McCormack; Séamus Kennedy, Conor Stakelum; Alan Tynan, Noel McGrath (c), Gearóid O’Connor; Jason Forde, Jake Morris, Seán Ryan; Subs: Mark Kehoe for Forde (16 inj), Conor Bowe for S Ryan (h-t), John McGrath for O’Connor (53), Enda Heffernan for Stakelum (63), Séamus Callanan for Bowe (69).	Mark Kehoe 1-4; Gearóid O’Connor 1-3 (0-3f); Alan Tynan, Jason Forde (3f) 0-4 each; Séamus Kennedy, Jake Morris 0-3 each; Conor Stakelum, Noel McGrath, Seán Ryan, Séamus Callanan 0-1 each.

Páirc Uí Chaoimh, Cork
Referee: Paud O’Dwyer (Carlow)
21 May
16:00
Round 3

Tipperary	0–25 – 0–25	Limerick
Gearoid O’Connor 0-10 (9fs), Jake Morris 0-4, Mark Kehoe 0-3, Conor Bowe 0-3, Noel McGrath 0-2, Seamus Callanan, Rhys Shelly, John McGrath 0-1 each	Report; Highlights Rhys Shelly; Cathal Barrett, Michael Breen, Ronan Maher; Eoghan Connolly, Bryan O’Mara, Seamus Kennedy; Alan Tynan, Dan McCormack; Connor Stakelum, Patrick Maher, Noel McGrath (c); Jake Morris, Gearoid O’Connor, Mark Kehoe. Subs: Seamus Callanan for P Maher (12, blood sub - reversed after 14); Seamus Callanan for Tynan (45); Conor Bowe for P Maher (52); Brian McGrath for Barrett (60); Johnny Ryan for Stakelum (69); Sean Ryan for Gearoid O’Connor (69); John McGrath for N McGrath (75).	Aaron Gillane 0-6 (3fs) Cathal O’Neill 0-5, Diarmuid Byrnes 0-4 (3fs), Tom Morrissey 0-4, Seamus Flanagan, Graeme Mulcahy 0-2 each, Peter Casey, Declan Hannon 0-1 each

Semple Stadium, Thurles
Referee: Sean Stack (Dublin)
28 May
16:00
Round 4

Tipperary	0–21 – 1–24	Waterford
Noel McGrath 0-7 (all frees); Seamus Callanan 0-3, Gearoid O’Connor 0-4 (0-3 frees); Ronan Maher 0-2, Brian McGrath 0-1, Alan Tynan 0-1, Mark Kehoe 0-1, Conor Bowe 0-1, Seamus Kennedy 0-1.	Report; Highlights Rhys Shelly; Brian McGrath, Michael Breen, Ronan Maher; Eoghan Connolly, Bryan O’Mara, Seamus Kennedy; Dan McCormack, Alan Tynan; Conor Stakelum, Patrick Maher, Noel McGrath (c); Seamus Callanan, Gearoid O’Connor, Mark Kehoe; Subs: Conor Bowe for Gearoid O’Connor (25 mins); Johnny Ryan for Brian McGrath (temp 44 mins, reversed 50 mins); Sean Ryan for Conor Stakelum (55 mins; John McGrath for Patrick Maher (60 mins); Joe Fogarty for Mark Kehoe (67 mins).	Stephen Bennett 0-8 (0-7 frees); Dessie Hutchinson 1-4, Jack Fagan 0-4, Neil Montgomery 0-2, Patrick Fitzgerald 0-2, Billy Nolan 0-1, Darragh Lyons 0-1, Peter Hogan 0-1, Patrick Curran 0-1.

Semple Stadium, Thurles
Referee: John Keenan (Wicklow)

Pos	Team	Pld	W	D	L	SF	SA	Diff	Pts	Qualification
1	Clare	4	3	0	1	8-91	10-76	+9	6	Advance to Munster Final
2	Limerick	4	2	1	1	6-88	2-98	+2	5	Advance to Munster Final
3	Tipperary	4	1	2	1	7-93	8-91	-1	4	Advance to All-Ireland preliminary quarter-finals
4	Cork	4	1	1	2	8-94	7-90	+7	3	
5	Waterford	4	1	0	3	1-77	3-88	-17	2	

== 2023 All-Ireland Senior Hurling Championship ==
After finishing in third place in the Munster Championship, Tipperary went into the All-Ireland preliminarily quarter-finals.

=== All-Ireland Championship Preliminary Quarter-final (v Offaly 17 June ) ===
On Saturday 17 June, Tipperary played Joe McDonagh Cup runners-up Offaly, managed by Johnny Kelly in the All-Ireland preliminary quarter-final. The match was televised live on GAAGO for €12, or as part of a season pass for €79. The team was announced on 15 June. Tickets for the game cost €25. The match was played in warm humid conditions that turned into thundery skies and torrential rain, in front of a crowd of 9,962. Tipperary had a 3-25 to 1-11 lead at half time and went on to record the highest ever total in the senior hurling in the highest-scoring match in Championship history. Mark Kehoe scored a hat-trick and ended up with a total of 3-3.

17 June
16:00
Preliminary Quarter-final

Offaly	3–18 – 7–38	Tipperary
E Cahill 1-7 (1-0 pen, 5fs); C Kiely 1-3 (1-1 fs); C Mitchell 1-1; J Sampson 0-2; B Duignan, P Clancy, L Langton, J Murphy, P Delaney 0-1 each.	Report; Highlights R Shelly; E Connolly, M Breen, C Morgan; D McCormack, R Maher, B O‘Mara; A Tynan, N McGrath (c); S Kennedy, J Forde, C Stakelum; M Kehoe, S Callanan, J Morris; Subs: J Ryan for Morgan (inj 47), E Heffernan for Maher & J Campion for N McGrath (47); G O’Connor for Callanan (53); J McGrath for Kennedy (61).	J Forde 2-11 (4 fs, 3 65s); M Kehoe 3-3; J Morris 0-7; C Stakelum 0-6; J McGrath 1-1; S Callanan 1-0; A Tynan 0-3; N McGrath 0-2; E Connolly, B O’Mara, D McCormack, S Kennedy, J Campion 0-1 each

Glenisk O'Connor Park, Tullamore
Referee: Johnny Murphy (Limerick)

=== All-Ireland Championship Quarter-final (v Galway 24 June ) ===
On Saturday 24 June Tipperary played Galway, managed by Henry Shefflin in the All-Ireland quarter-final at the Gaelic Grounds in Limerick. It was the 16th meeting between the teams in the championship since the 1987 All-Ireland Semi-final. Galway were coming into the match after losing the Leinster final on 11 June to a late goal by Kilkenny. The team was announced on 22 June with just one change to the team that started the week before against Offaly, Cathal Barrett coming into the team instead of the injured Craig Morgan. The match was televised live on RTÉ 2 as part of the Sunday Game presented by Joanne Cantwell with analysis by Joe Canning, Brendan Cummins and Ursula Jacob. Commentary on the game was provided by Ger Canning alongside Anthony Daly. Tickets for the game cost €40 for the stand and €30 for the terrace.

The match was played in front of a crowd of 34,180 in mostly dry warm conditions with occasional showers, it was the second quarter-final played at the venue after Clare had defeated Dublin in the earlier match. In a close first half low on quality, Galway playing into the city end had an 0-10 to 0-7 lead at half-time. Galway scored a goal 20 seconds into the second half when Conor Whelan got past Cathal Barrett after he slipped to score with a low shot to the right corner of the net to put Galway into a six point lead. They were eight ahead in the 51st minute when Conor Whelan scored another point. Tipperary got to within four points in the 58th minute after four unanswered points. With ten minutes to go John McGrath came on as a substitute for Tipperary and within a minute he scored a goal to put just a point between the teams, running onto a breaking ball to shoot with a groundstroke high to the net. Galway responded and stayed in front before going on to win the game by 1-20 to 1-18. Galway had 18 wides during the game and Rhys Shelly kept Tipperary in the game with three saves including a late save down low from Cianan Fahy.

Tipperary manager Liam Cahill speaking after the game said "Bitterly disappointed, we just didn’t spark at all today, we seemed to be labouring right through the game. We gave ourselves a chance with seven or eight minutes to go and got it back to a point but continued to make unforced errors and even that aside I suppose we were still lucky to be only a point in it with eight minutes to go".

24 June
18:15
Quarter-final

Galway	1–20 – 1–18	Tipperary
Evan Niland 0-8 (7fs), Conor Whelan 1-4, Tom Monaghan 0-3, Cianan Fahy 0-2, Daithí Burke, Joseph Cooney, Ronan Glennon 0-1 each.	Report; Highlights Rhys Shelly; Michael Breen, Eoghan Connolly, Dan McCormack; Bryan O’Mara, Ronan Maher, Cathal Barrett; Conor Stakelum, Alan Tynan; Séamus Kennedy, Jason Forde, Noel McGrath (c); Jake Morris, Séamus Callanan, Mark Kehoe; Subs: Gearóid O’Connor for Callanan (HT), Conor Bowe for Kehoe (HT), Johnny Ryan for Stakelum (50), John McGrath for N McGrath (53), Jack Ryan for Tynan (70+1).	Jason Forde 0-10 (8fs), John McGrath 1-0, Alan Tynan, Séamus Kennedy 0-2 each, Michael Breen, Ronan Maher, Gearóid O’Connor, Johnny Ryan 0-1 each.

Gaelic Grounds, Limerick
Referee: John Keenan (Wicklow)

== Retirements ==
In February, two-time All-Ireland winner John O'Dwyer announced his retirement from inter-county hurling after ten years. In a released statement he said "It was a great pleasure to represent my county and win some silverware along the way, thanks to those close to me and to my club Killenaule, who without their support it wouldn't have been possible. So long."

On 6 September three-time All-Ireland winner and former All-Ireland winning captain Séamus Callanan announced his retirement from inter-county hurling after 16 years. In a released statement he said " I am very grateful to have had such an enjoyable career with so many great memories, the highlight of my playing career was undoubtedly captaining Tipperary to All-Ireland success in 2019". Callanan finished with a championship total of 40 goals and 226 points in 66 appearances. His last score was a goal against Offaly on 17 June, and his last appearance was against Galway on 24 June.

On 3 November, two-time All-Ireland winner Niall O'Meara announced his retirement from inter-county hurling. In a released statement he said "After some thought I've decided the time is right for me to retire from inter county hurling. For as long as I can remember I always wanted to wear the blue and gold jersey and luckily since 2010 playing on the minor hurling and football teams I had the opportunity, something I will always cherish." O'Meara did not feature during the year due to ankle and groin injuries or in 2022, with his last appearance coming as a substitute in the defeat to Waterford on 31 July 2021.

== Awards ==
The PwC All-Star Awards

The nominations for the PwC All-Stars were announced on 28 September with Tipperary receiving three nominations in the 45-player shortlist, Ronan Maher, Noel McGrath, and Jake Morris. The awards ceremony took place at the RDS in Dublin on 17 November and was shown live on RTÉ television, Tipperary did not win any awards for the fourth year in a row.

== Dillon Quirke Foundation senior hurling tournament ==
On 19 February Tipperary played Kilkenny in the Dillon Quirke Foundation senior hurling tournament at Semple Stadium. The Dillon Quirke Foundation was established by the Quirke family in memory of Dillon Quirke who died after collapsing during a club game in August 2022. Kilkenny won the game on a 4-20 to 0-25 scoreline in front of 4,628.

19 February
14:00
Challenge Tournament

Tipperary	4–20 – 0–25	Kilkenny
M Kehoe (0-7), S Ryan (0-4,4fs), Jack Ryan (0-3,3fs), K O Kelly (0-3), R Maher (0-2,2fs), C O Dwyer, E Connolly, P Creedon, P Maher, Johnny Ryan, N McGrath (0-1 each)	Report Barry Hogan; C McCarthy, E Heffernan, J Quigley; G Ryan, P Campion, S Neville; J Campion, C O Dwyer; J Fogarty, G Kelly, C O Kelly; P Creedon, M Kehoe, Jack Ryan. Subs: S Ryan for G Kelly (26mins), E Connolly for Neville (29mins), R Maher for P Campion (h/t), P Maher for Jack Ryan (38mins), S Kennedy for O Dwyer (39mins), D McCormack for J Campion (43mins), N McGrath for Creedon (55mins), S Callanan for K O Kelly (67mins), C Stakelum for McCarthy (69mins).	G Dunne (3-1), M Keoghan (1-3), J Bergin (0-3, 3fs), P Deegan, T Phelan, C Kenny (0-2 each); B Ryan, C Delaney, J Donnelly, D Brennan P Walsh, P Mullen, S Murphy (0-1 each).

Semple Stadium
Referee: F Horgan (Tipperary).

== Ryan O'Dwyer Fundraiser ==
On 8 April Tipperary played Wexford in a challenge fundraiser for the Ryan O'Dwyer appeal in Carrick-on-Suir. Tipperary had a 1-15 to 0-7 at the break with Conor Bowe getting the goal in the 12th minute with a low shot to the net. Further goals for Tipperary arrived in the second half from Gearoid O'Connor and John McGrath. The game was stopped a minute from time when a melee broke out with Wexford player Lee Chin being subjected to racist comments from the crowd. The score with a minute remaining was Tipperary 3-28 Wexford 1-14.

8 April
15:00
Challenge Tournament

Tipperary	3–28 – 1–14	Wexford
	Report Barry Hogan; Cathal Barrett, Michael Breen, Gavin Ryan; Enda Heffernan, Bryan O Meara, Brian McGrath; Conor Stakelum, Johnny Ryan; Gearoid O'Connor, John McGrath, Mark Kehoe; Conor Bowe, Kian O Kelly, Sean Ryan Subs: Rhys Shelly for Barry Hogan (HT); Dan McCormack for Gavin Ryan (HT); Jack Ryan for Kian O'Kelly (HT); Patrick Bonner Maher for Gearoid O'Connor (51 mins); Pauric Campion for Brian McGrath (52 mins); Jason Forde for Sean Ryan(55 mins); John Campion for Cathal Barrett (56 mins); Cian O'Dwyer for Conor Bowe(58 mins).

Carrick-on-Suir
Referee: John Keenan
