= 2022 Tipperary county hurling team season =

Hurling (sport) season

- Team: Tipperary county
- Manager: Colm Bonnar
- Captain: Ronan Maher
- All-Ireland SHC: Did not qualify
- Munster SHC: 4th in Group Stage
- National League: 4th Division 1 Group B
- Top scorer Championship: Noel McGrath (0-33)
- Highest SHC attendance: 27,131 (v Cork 22 May)
- Lowest SHC attendance: 10,982 (v Waterford 17 April)
- Standard Kit

The 2022 season was Colm Bonnar's first year as manager of the Tipperary senior hurling team, having been appointed on 8 September 2021 for three years. Liam Sheedy had stepped down in August 2021 as manager after three years in charge.

The team had a new sponsor after Teneo's three-year deal came to an end. On 21 January, Tipperary GAA announced a two-year sponsorship deal with financial services technology solutions company Fiserv.

On 5 February, Ronan Maher was named as the new captain of the team. The decision was made by a secret ballot vote from all members of the panel.

On 13 July, the Tipperary management committee relieved Colm Bonnar from his duties as Tipperary senior hurling manager after one year in charge.

On 18 July, Liam Cahill was named as the new manager of the team on a three-year term, after leaving his position with Waterford three days earlier.

== 2022 senior hurling management team ==
On 1 October 2021, Bonnar announced Tommy Dunne, Johnny Enright and Paul Curran as his selectors, with further appointments to follow.

=== 2022 squad ===
On 18 January Colm Bonnar announced his panel for the upcoming National League. John O'Dwyer was not named in the panel due to a knee injury. In January Pádraic Maher confirmed that he would be involved but was recovering from an ankle injury and was expected to miss the start of the League campaign.

On 1 February, Pádraic Maher announced his retirement from club and inter-county hurling due to medical advice received regarding a neck injury.

- Barry Hogan – Kiladangan
- Brian Hogan – Lorrha Dorrha
- Craig Morgan – Kilruane MacDonaghs
- Brian McGrath – Loughmore-Castleiney
- Cathal Barrett – Holycross-Ballycahill
- Eoghan Connolly – Cashel King Cormacs
- Ronan Maher – Thurles Sarsfields
- Robert Byrne – Portroe
- Paddy Cadell – JK Brackens
- Barry Heffernan – Nenagh Eire Óg
- Dillon Quirke – Clonoulty Rossmore
- James Quigley – Kiladangan
- Enda Heffernan – Clonoulty Rossmore
- John Meagher – Loughmore-Castleiney
- Séamus Kennedy – St Marys
- Dan McCormack – Borris-Ileigh
- Alan Flynn – Kiladangan
- Cian Darcy – Kilruane MacDonaghs
- Conor Bowe – Moyne-Templetuohy
- John McGrath – Loughmore-Castleiney
- Patrick Maher – Lorrha Dorrha
- Ger Browne – Cashel King Cormacs
- Mark Kehoe – Kilsheelan Kilcash
- Michael Breen – Ballina
- Noel McGrath – Loughmore-Castleiney
- Pádraic Maher – Thurles Sarsfields (announced his retirement on 1 February)
- Conor Stakelum – Thurles Sarsfields
- Jake Morris – Nenagh Eire Óg
- Gearoid O’Connor – Moyne-Templetuohy
- Dylan Walsh – Ballingarry
- Denis Maher – Thurles Sarsfields
- Jason Forde – Silvermines
- Paul Flynn – Kiladangan
- Séamus Callanan – Drom & Inch

The following players made their competitive senior debut in 2022.

- Conor Stakelum against Laois on 5 February.
- Conor Bowe against Dublin on 26 February.
- Enda Heffernan against Antrim on 20 March.
- Gearoid O’Connor against Clare on 24 April.

== 2022 Munster Senior Cup ==
Tipperary started the year by playing in the Munster Senior Cup. In their opening game on 8 January they lost to Kerry by 0-14 to 0-17 in Tralee. It was Kerry's first ever senior hurling win against Tipperary. During the game against Kerry, Willie Connors suffered a serious ankle injury and missed the remainder of the season.

=== Result ===
8 January
14:00
Quarter-final

Kerry	0–17 – 0–14	Tipperary
Shane Conway 0-9 (6f), Paudie Ahern 0-3, Fionan Mackessy 0-1, Colum Harty 0-1, Michael Leane 0-1, Gavin Dooley 0-1, Shane Nolan 0-1 (0-1f).	Report Barry Hogan; Daragh Carey, James Quigley, Craig Morgan; Eoghan Connolly, Robert Byrne, Paddy Cadell; Dan McCormack, Sean Curran; Ger Browne, Conor Stakelum, Rian Doody; Sean Ryan, Paul Flynn, Kian O’Kelly; Subs: Cathal Barrett for Cadell (18 mins), Declan McGrath for Carey (25 mins), Willie Connors (0-1) for Doody (half-time), Seamus Kennedy for Curran (53 mins), Dillon Walsh (0-4, four frees) for O’Kelly (57 mins), O’Kelly for Connors (65 mins).	Sean Ryan 0-7 (0-7f), Dylan Walsh 0-4 (0-4f), Robert Byrne 0-1, Conor Stakelum 0-1, Willie Connors 0-1.

Austin Stack Park
Referee: Ciaran O’Regan (Cork)

== 2022 National Hurling League ==
=== Summary ===
The National league started in February with Tipperary playing in Division 1 Group B. They played Laois in their opening game on Saturday 5 February, with the team announced on 3 February. In wet and windy conditions Tipperary won the game 0-21 to 1-14. Jason Forde missed a penalty for Tipperary in the 23rd minute after Jake Morris was dragged to the ground, Laois goalkeeper Enda Rowland saved the penalty, deflecting the ball over the bar. Tipperary had an 0-11 to 0-7 lead at half-time. In the 45th minute Laois were reduced to fourteen men when Paddy Purcell appeared to strike Craig Morgan. In the 50th minute a 65 from Enda Rowland dropped short and ended up in the net to reduce Tipperary's lead to three points but Tipperary went on to win by four points.

A week later in round 2, Tipperary played Kilkenny on Sunday 12 February at Semple Stadium. The team announced showed no changes from the previous week. The game was televised live on TG4. In dry windy conditions Tipperary playing with the wind had a 1-11 to 0-8 lead at half-time, the goal coming from Jake Morris in the 37th minute when he ran in on goal from the left before batting one handed to the net from close range. Kilkenny had leveled the game up in the last minute with a point from Walter Walsh but an injury time long range free from Jason Forde won the game for Tipperary by a point on a 1-19 to 1-18 scoreline.

In round 3 of the league, Tipperary played Dublin on Saturday 26 February at Semple Stadium. Seamus Callanan started his first game of the year with Barry Hogan taking over in goal and Brian McGrath starting in the full back line. In total there were eight changes to the team from the previous game against Kilkenny. The game was televised live on GAAGO with commentary from Darragh Maloney and Dónal Óg Cusack. In very windy conditions Dublin had a 1-8 to 0-10 lead at half-time playing with the wind, their goal coming after 25 minutes with a low shot to the right corner from Riain McBride after he cut in from the right. Dublin got a second goal after 50 minutes when Ronan Hayes cut in from the right to score from a tight angle to put Dublin into a five point lead. John McGrath, Noel McGrath and Conor Bowe all came on for Tipperary and they were on top for the final ten minutes and reduced the lead down to one point, with Jason Forde missing a goal chance late on before Dublin held on for the win. Dublin’s win was their fourth in 11 league and championship outings against Tipperary.

On Sunday 6 March Tipperary played Waterford in round 4 of the league at Walsh Park. There were seven changes to the side which lost to Dublin with Cathal Barrett and James Quigley returning to the team. Séamus Callanan sustained a broken finger in training on 4 March and will be absent for four to five weeks. The game was televised live on TG4. In dry sunny conditions in front of 5,865, Waterford had a 1-13 to 0-14 lead at half-time with the Waterford goal coming from Stephen Bennett after 21 minutes with a low shot to the left corner, Tipperary initially led by 4 points after seven minutes and later by six before Waterford came back to score 1-6 in nine minutes. Tipperary levelled early in the second half thru Jason Forde before Waterford pulled away with 10 points in a row including seven from Bennett to win comfortably by ten points.

On Sunday 20 March Tipperary played Antrim in round 5 of the league at Semple Stadium. Dan McCormack and Noel McGrath along with goalkeeper Brian Hogan returned to the starting team. In dry sunny conditions, Tipperary were 5-10 to 0-13 in front at half-time, the first goal coming from Jason Forde with a strike to the net after a pass from the left, there were two further goals from Mark Kehoe, one from Michael Breen, and one from Seamus Kennedy with a low shot to the net from the left in the first half. John McGrath scored a sixth goal with a shot to the net from the right past the advancing goalkeeper before getting a second when he cut in from the right before firing to the net. Tipperary went on to win by 7-29 to 1-17 but failed to qualify for the league semi-finals. Patrick 'Bonner' Maher came on at half-time to make his first appearance in the league. In total 31 players were used during the league campaign. On 11 April Seamus Callinan had a setback in his recovery from a broken bone in his hand with an infection in the bone and may now miss most of the Munster Championship.

=== Result ===
5 February
18:00
Round 1

Laois	1–14 – 0–21	Tipperary
Stephen Maher 0-8 (five frees), Enda Rowland 1-3 (1-1 ‘65s, 0-2 frees), James Keyes 0-3	Report; Highlights Brian Hogan; Cathal Barrett, James Quigley, Craig Morgan; Dillon Quirke, Seamus Kennedy, Barry Heffernan; Alan Flynn, Michael Breen; Dan McCormack, Jason Forde, Ger Browne; Mark Kehoe, Denis Maher, Jake Morris; Subs: Conor Stakelum for Morris (46), Paul Flynn for Maher (58), Paddy Cadell for Flynn (65), Ronan Maher (c) for Heffernan (67), Seamus Callanan for Kehoe (69)	Jason Forde 0-11 (six frees, 0-1 pen), Mark Kehoe 0-4, Jake Morris 0-3, Michael Breen 0-2, Cathal Barrett 0-1

O'Moore Park
Referee: Sean Cleere [Kilkenny]
13 February
15:45
Round 2

Tipperary	1–19 – 1–18	Kilkenny
Jason Forde 0-10 (4 frees, 1 65); Jake Morris 1-2; Barry Heffernan 0-2; Michael Breen, Ger Browne, Denis Maher, Ronan Maher, Brian Hogan (free) 0-1 each	Report; Highlights Brian Hogan; Cathal Barrett, James Quigley, Craig Morgan; Dillon Quirke, Seamus Kennedy, Barry Heffernan; Alan Flynn, Michael Breen; Dan McCormack, Jason Forde, Ger Browne; Mark Kehoe, Denis Maher, Jake Morris; Subs: Paddy Cadell for Breen (45); Ronan Maher (c) for Browne (51), Seamus Callanan for D Maher (56), Paul Flynn for Kehoe (67), Conor Stakelum for McCormack (70+1).	John Donnelly 0-5 (4 frees); Padraig Walsh 0-4; Tadhg O’Dwyer 1-0; Walter Walsh 0-2; Tom Phelan, Mikey Carey, Niall Brassil, David Blanchfield; Cian Kenny, Paddy Deegan, Martin Keoghan 0-1 each

Semple Stadium
Referee: Liam Gordon (Galway)
26 February
17:00
Round 3

Tipperary	0–21 – 2–16	Dublin
Jason Forde 0-12 (0-11f, 0-1 sideline), Jake Morris 0-3, Robert Byrne 0-2, Michael Breen 0-1, Noel McGrath 0-1, Conor Bowe 0-1. Paul Flynn 0-1.	Report; Highlights Barry Hogan; Eoghan Connolly, Brian McGrath, Craig Morgan; Robert Byrne, Seamus Kennedy, Ronan Maher (c); Alan Flynn, Paddy Cadell; Dan McCormack, Jason Forde, Michael Breen; Paul Flynn, Seamus Callanan, Jake Morris; Subs: Noel McGrath for Cadell 55, John McGrath for Callanan 55, Conor Bowe for Flynn 62.	Donal Burke 0-9 (0-8f), Rian McBride 1-2, Ronan Hayes 1-1, Fergal Whitely 0-2, James Madden 0-1, Conor Burke 0-1.

Semple Stadium
Referee: Johnny Murphy (Limerick)
6 March
13:45
Round 4

Waterford	1–28 – 0–21	Tipperary
Stephen Bennett (1-16; 0-11f, 0-1 65), Patrick Curran (0-3), Jack Prendergast (0-3), Iarlaith Daly (0-2), Kieran Bennett (0-1), Michael Kiely (0-1), Tadhg de Búrca (0-1), Mikey Mahony (0-1).	Report; Highlights Barry Hogan; Cathal Barrett, James Quigley, Brian McGrath; Dillon Quirke, Ronan Maher (c), Robert Byrne; Paddy Cadell, Barry Heffernan; Conor Bowe; Jason Forde, Michael Breen; Mark Kehoe, John McGrath, Jake Morris; Subs: Alan Flynn for Paddy Cadell (HT), Denis Maher for John McGrath (54), Conor Stakelum for Jason Forde (68), Cian Darcy for Dillon Quirke (72).	Jason Forde (0-6; 0-4f), Mark Kehoe (0-4), Michael Breen (0-4), Conor Bowe (0-2), Ronan Maher (0-2), Barry Heffernan (0-1), Brian McGrath (0-1), Jake Morris (0-1).

Walsh Park
Referee: Colm Lyons (Cork)
20 March
13:45
Round 5

Tipperary	7–29 – 1–17	Antrim
Jason Forde 1-8 (0-4f); Mark Kehoe, John McGrath 2-3 each; Noel McGrath 0-4; Michael Breen 1-1; Ronan Maher 0-3; Conor Bowe, Paul Flynn, Conor Stakelum 0-2 each; Seamus Kennedy 1-0; Robert Byrne 0-1.	Report; Highlights Brian Hogan; Cathal Barrett, James Quigley, Craig Morgan; Robert Byrne, Ronan Maher (c), Seamus Kennedy; Dan McCormack, Barry Heffernan; Conor Bowe, Noel McGrath, Michael Breen, Jason Forde, Mark Kehoe, John McGrath; Subs: Conor Stakelum for McCormack (HT); Patrick Maher for Breen (HT); Enda Heffernan for Byrne (45); Paul Flynn for Kehoe (50); Cian Darcy for Bowe (58).	Keelan Molloy, James McNaughton (2f) 0-5 each; Domhnall Nugent 1-0; Sean Elliott 0-2; Paddy Burke, Scott Walsh, Conal Cunning, Conor Johnston, Conor McCann 0-1 each.

Semple Stadium
Referee: Rory McGann (Clare)

NHL semi final Relegation play-off

Team	Pld	W	D	L	F	A	Diff	Pts
Kilkenny	5	4	0	1	132	94	38	8
Waterford	5	3	1	1	155	116	39	7
Dublin	5	3	1	1	121	119	2	7
Tipperary	5	3	0	2	135	111	24	6
Laois	5	1	0	4	103	166	-63	2
Antrim	5	0	0	5	109	149	-40	0

== 2022 Munster Senior Hurling Championship ==
=== Round 1 (v Waterford 17 April) ===
On 17 April Tipperary played Waterford, managed by Liam Cahill in the first match of the Munster Championship at Walsh Park. The match was televised live on RTÉ 2 as part of the Sunday Game presented by Joanne Cantwell with analysis by Anthony Daly, Dónal Óg Cusack, and Shane Dowling. Commentary on the game was provided by Ger Canning alongside Michael Duignan. In Colm Bonnar's first championship game in charge he named four championship debuts with James Quigley, Craig Morgan, Dillon Quirke and Conor Bowe all named in the starting team. In front of a sell-out crowd of 10,982 at Walsh Park there had been heavy rain all morning before the game but the weather gradually improved throughout the match. Waterford had raced into a 4 point lead early on before Tipperary scored a goal from Mark Kehoe in the 7th minute with a low shot to the left of the net past the advancing goalkeeper from the left after a pass from Jason Forde. Waterford goalkeeper Shaun O’Brien saved a certain goal from Jason Forde in the 26th minute diving low to save the low shot. Tipperary were six ahead before it was reduced to a 1-12 to 0-11 lead at half-time. Just before the end of the first half, Waterford's Mikey Kiely pulled wildly on the wall in the air and caught the head of Seamus Kennedy resulting in a blood injury with Kennedy replaced temporarily by Robert Byrne. RTE analysts Anthony Daly and Shane Dowling both taught that a red card should have been shown to Kiely. Before the start of the second half, Tipperary coach Tommy Dunne was initially shown a yellow card by the referee Johnny Murphy but this turned into a red card after the exchange continued. Dunne received a three-month ban two weeks later after Murphy reported him for abuse consistent with a Category 5 infraction for which the minimum penalty is a three-month ban. In the second half Waterford scored two early goals with Michael Kiely scoring with a volley to the net after 37 minutes and Dessie Hutchinson with a shot high to the right of the net after 44 minutes to put Waterford into a 2-16 to 1-14 lead. Mark Kehoe got a second goal for Tipperary in the 58th minute with a low shot to the left corner of the net to cut the lead to two before Noel McGrath reduced it to one with a free. Waterford went on to score the next three points to win by four on a 2-24 to 2-20 scoreline.

=== Round 2 (v Clare 24 April) ===
On Sunday 24 April, Tipperary played Clare, managed by Brian Lohan in their second match of the Munster Championship at Semple Stadium. The match was televised live on RTÉ 2 as part of the Sunday Game presented by Joanne Cantwell from MacHale Park with analysis by Liam Sheedy and Davy Fitzgerald. Commentary on the game was provided by Ger Canning alongside Michael Duignan. There were two changes to the Tipperary team from the previous match with Dan McCormack replacing Alan Flynn and John McGrath in for the injured Conor Bowe in the full-forward line. In sunny dry conditions, Clare scored three goals in the first half to lead by 13 at half-time on a 3-11 to 0-7 scoreline. The first Clare goal came from Ian Galvin in the 8th minute when he deflected to the net after Tipperary goalkeeper Brian Hogan had pushed Peter Duggan’s shot onto the crossbar. The second came from Peter Duggan in the 21st minute, again deflecting into the net after Brian Hogan had saved a shot from John Conlon. Brian McGrath on for the injured James Quigley conceded a penalty for holding Peter Duggan’s shirt, with Tony Kelly firing to the net to put 11 points between the side. Two minutes into the second half, substitute Ger Browne scored a goal with a low shot to the right corner after a solo run. In the 49th minute Clare goalkeeper Eibhear Quilligan misjudged Barry Heffernan’s dropping shot from the middle of the pitch when trying to catch it with the ball finding the net for Tipperary's second goal and they got as close as 7 points before Clare eased to the win by 8 points.

=== Round 3 (v Limerick 8 May) ===
On Sunday 8 May, Tipperary played All-Ireland champions Limerick, managed by John Kiely in their third match of the Munster Championship at the Gaelic Grounds. Colm Bonnar made five changes to the Tipperary team with Conor Stakelum, Ger Browne, and Paul Flynn starting instead of the injured James Quigley, Jason Forde, and John McGrath with McGrath's season looking to be over after suffering an achilles injury. Barry Hogan started instead of coming in for Brian Hogand, while Paddy Caddell replaced Dan McCormack. The match was televised live on RTÉ 2 as part of the Sunday Game presented by Joanne Cantwell with analysis from Shane Dowling. Commentary on the game was provided by Ger Canning alongside Anthony Daly. In dry conditions, Aaron Gillane scored Limerick's first goal in the 8th minute, catching the ball before firing to the net from the right to put Limerick into a 1-4 to 0-3 lead. Tipperary had a 0-14 to 1-9 lead at half-time and continued to lead with ten minutes to go before Limerick pulled away to win by seven points with two late goals from Conor Boylan in the 67th minute with a low shot to the net one handed along the ground and a second from Aaron Gillane in the 70th minute, when he caught a high ball before firing tom the net.

=== Round 4 (v Cork 22 May) ===
On Sunday 22 May, Tipperary played Cork, managed by Kieran Kingston in their fourth match of the Munster Championship at Semple Stadium. After three defeats Tipperary still had a chance of finishing in third place and qualifying for the All-Ireland series. They needed to beat Cork by seven points and also required Clare to beat Waterford by a minimum of eight points in the other game taking place at the same time to progress. Jason Forde and Dan McCormack returned to the Tipperary team replacing Paddy Cadell and Paul Flynn. The match was televised live on RTÉ 2 as part of the Sunday Game presented by Joanne Cantwell with analysis by Liam Sheedy, Anthony Daly and Dónal Óg Cusack. Commentary on the game was provided by Ger Canning. In dry conditions, Cork led by 2-14 to 1-9 at half-time, the Tipperary goal coming from Jake Morris inside the first minute of the game when after receiving a pass from Mark Kehoe he ran in to shoot low one handed past the advancing goalkeeper as Tipperary led by 1-3 to no score after five minutes. In the 11th minute, Mark Kehoe was fouled in the box by Robert Downey, Noel McGrath’s resulting penalty hit the post with the ball eventually reaching Cork's Alan Connolly at the other end of the pitch, he fired low to the right corner from the left to leave Tipperary with a one point lead on a score of 1-4 to 1-3. In the 15th minute Darragh Fitzgibbon drove the ball low past Barry Hogan from the left after an unchallenged solo run up the pitch to put Cork four points in front. In the 63rd minute Cork got a third goal from Tim O'Mahony with a shot along the ground after a low pass from the left to put Cork 15 points ahead. Alan Flynn was sent off for an off the ball incident with the hurley with ten minutes to go in the match with Cork running out winners by 3-30 to 1-24. With this defeat Tipperary finished in fourth place and failed to qualify for the All-Ireland series.

Tipperary would have had to play Kerry in a play-off to compete in the 2023 Munster Championship if Kerry had won the 2022 Joe McDonagh Cup on 4 June. Antrim went on to beat Kerry in that final.

=== Results ===
17 April
14:00
Round 1

Waterford	2–24 – 2–20	Tipperary
Stephen Bennett 0-10 (all frees), Dessie Hutchinson 1-3, Patrick Curran 0-4, Michael Kiely 1-0, Jamie Barron 0-2, Austin Gleeson 0-2 (1 sideline), Shane McNulty 0-2, Jack Prendergast 0-1,	Report; Highlights Brian Hogan; Cathal Barrett, James Quigley, Craig Morgan; Dillon Quirke, Ronan Maher (c), Seamus Kennedy; Alan Flynn, Barry Heffernan; Conor Bowe, Noel McGrath, Michael Breen; Jason Forde, Mark Kehoe, Jake Morris; Subs: Patrick Maher for Conor Bowe (half-time), Dan McCormack for Alan Flynn (45), Conor Stakelum for Barry Heffernan (52), Ger Browne for Jason Forde (60), John McGrath for Michael Breen (66)	Mark Kehoe 2-0, Noel McGrath 0-6 (2f), Jason Forde 0-4 (4f), Jake Morris 0-2, Michael Breen 0-2, Dan McCormack 0-2, Barry Heffernan 0-1, Conor Bowe 0-1, Conor Stakelum 0-1, Brian Hogan 0-1 (f),

Walsh Park, Waterford
Referee: Johnny Murphy (Limerick)
24 April
14:00
Round 2

Tipperary	2–16 – 3–21	Clare
Jason Forde 0-7 (5 frees, 1 65, 1 s-cut); Ger Browne 1-3; Barry Heffernan 1-0; Ronan Maher 0-2 (1 free); Cathal Barrett, Noel McGrath, Michael Breen, Mark Kehoe 0-1 each.	Report; Highlights Brian Hogan; Cathal Barrett, James Quigley, Craig Morgan; Dillon Quirke, Ronan Maher (c), Seamus Kennedy; Dan McCormack, Barry Heffernan; Jake Morris, Noel McGrath, Michael Breen; Jason Forde, Mark Kehoe, John McGrath Subs: Ger Browne for J McGrath (23 inj); Brian McGrath for Quigley (27 inj); Conor Stakelum for McCormack (HT); Gearoid O’Connor for Morris (49); Alan Flynn for Heffernan (65).	Tony Kelly 1-7 (1-0 pen, 0-5 frees); Peter Duggan, Ian Galvin 1-2 each; Ryan Taylor, Shane O’Donnell, Robyn Mounsey 0-2 each; Rory Hayes, Diarmuid Ryan, David McInerney, David Fitzgerald 0-1 each.

Semple Stadium
Referee: James Owens (Wexford)
8 May
14:00
Round 3

Limerick	3–21 – 0-23	Tipperary
A. Gillane (2-5, 0-4 frees); T. Morrissey (0-5); D. Byrnes (0-3, frees, 1 65); C. Boylan (1-0); D. O’Donovan (0-2); C. O’Neill, G. Mulcahy, G. Hegarty, B. Nash, D. Reidy, D. Hannon (0-1 each).	Report; Highlights Barry Hogan; C. Barrett, R. Maher (c), C. Morgan; P. Cadell, S. Kennedy, B. Heffernan; D. Quirke, C Stakelum; M. Breen, N. McGrath, G. Browne; J. Morris, M. Kehoe, P. Flynn. Subs: R. Byrne for P. Cadell (35); C. Bowe for P. Flynn (48); D. McCormack for G. Browne (64); A. Flynn for C. Stakelum (69).	N. McGrath (0-13, 9 frees, 2 65s, 1 sideline); G. Browne, J. Morris (0-3 each); M. Kehoe, B. Heffernan, A. Flynn, R. Byrnes (0-1 each).

Gaelic Grounds, Limerick
Referee: Liam Gordon (Galway)
22 May
16:00
Round 4

Tipperary	1–24 – 3-30	Cork
N. McGrath (0-13, 12 frees); J. Morris (1-2); J. Forde (0-5); C. Stakelum, D. Quirke, R. Maher (free), P. Maher (0-1 each).	Report; Highlights Barry Hogan; C. Barrett, R. Maher (c), C. Morgan; D. Quirke, S. Kennedy, B. Heffernan; C. Stakelum, D. McCormack; M. Breen, N. McGrath, G. Browne; J. Forde, M. Kehoe, J. Morris. Subs: A. Flynn for B. Heffernan, P. Maher for G. Browne (both h-t); J. Quigley for C. Barrett (inj 40); C. Bowe for M. Breen (47); G. O’Connor for D. McCormack (69).	C. Lehane (0-8, 1 free); P. Horgan (0-5, 3 frees, 1 65); A. Connolly, T. O’Mahony (1-1 each); D. Fitzgibbon (1-0 each); S. Kingston (0-4); R. O’Flynn, M. Coleman (1 free), S Harnedy (0-3 each); J. O’Connor (0-2).

Semple Stadium
Referee: S. Stack (Dublin)

=== Munster table ===
Pos	Team	Pld	W	D	L	SF	SA	Diff	Pts	Qualification Notes
1	Clare	4	3	1	0	6-104	7-79	+22	7	Advance to Final
2	Limerick	4	3	1	0	6-97	3-85	+21	7	Advance to Final
3	Cork	4	2	0	2	8-89	4-96	+5	4	Advance to Preliminary Quarter-Finals
4	Waterford	4	1	0	3	7-76	7-103	-27	2	
5	Tipperary	4	0	0	4	5-83	11-96	-31	0	Possible Relegation Playoff

== 2022 All-Ireland Senior Hurling Championship ==
Tipperary finished in fourth place in the Munster Championship and failed to qualify for the All-Ireland series.

== Awards ==
The PwC All-Star Awards

The nominations for the PwC All-Stars were announced on 8 September with Noel McGrath being the only Tipperary nominee in the 45-player shortlist. The awards were presented on 28 October with McGrath missing out on an award.

== Retirements ==
On 1 February, Pádraic Maher announced his retirement from club and inter-county hurling due to medical advice received regarding a neck injury.

== Departures ==
On 13 July, selectors Tommy Dunne and Paul Curran both stepped away from the Tipperary setup.

On 13 July, the Tipperary management committee at a meeting voted for change and decided to relieve Colm Bonnar from his duties as Tipperary senior hurling manager after one year in charge. Bonnar Speaking to Tipperarylive.ie said he was "extremely disappointed" with the decision, noting that when he took the job, it was made clear that the county were entering a "transition and rebuilding period."

== Death of Dillon Quirke ==
On 5 August 2022, Tipperary player Dillon Quirke collapsed and died while playing a Tipperary SHC match for his club against Kilruane MacDonaghs at Semple Stadium. The match was abandoned after he was taken to Tipperary University Hospital. Tipperary GAA postponed the weekend's matches as a mark of respect. President of Ireland Michael D. Higgins and Taoiseach Micheál Martin paid tribute. A vigil was held at his home club on 6 August. Tributes were also paid on television ahead of the camogie finals on 7 August. His funeral was held on 9 August in Clonoulty.
