= Conor McCarthy =

Conor McCarthy may refer to:

- Conor McCarthy (Cork Gaelic footballer) (born 1981)
- Conor McCarthy (Monaghan Gaelic footballer) (born 1995)
- Conor McCarthy (association footballer) (born 1998)
- Conor McCarthy (football manager) (born 1998), Irish association football manager
- Conor McCarthy (hurler), Irish hurler
