= Johnny Ryan (Tipperary hurler) =

Irish hurler

Sport
- Sport: Hurling
- Position: Forward
Club
- Years: Club
- Arravale Rovers
Club titles
- Tipperary titles: 0
Inter-county*
Years	County	Apps (scores)
2023–	Tipperary	0 (0-00)
Inter-county titles
- Munster titles: 0
- All-Irelands: 1
- NHL: 0
- All Stars: 0
- *Inter County team apps and scores correct as of 1.

Johnny Ryan is an Irish hurler who plays club hurling for Arravale Rovers and at inter-county level with the Tipperary county hurling team.

== Career ==
On 4 February 2023, Ryan made his league debut for Tipperary in the opening round of the 2023 National Hurling League against Laois as Tipperary won by 2–32 to 0–18.

On 20 July in the 2025 All-Ireland final, he was and unused substitute as Tipperary defeated Cork by 3-27 to 1-19 and claim a 29th All-Ireland title.

== Honours ==
Tipperary

- All-Ireland Senior Hurling Championship (1): 2025
- All-Ireland Under-20 Hurling Championship (1): 2019
- Munster Under-20 Hurling Championship (1): 2019
