= Cian O'Dwyer =

Irish hurler

Sport
- Sport: Hurling
- Position: Forward
Club
- Years: Club
- Clonakenny GAA
Club titles
- Tipperary titles: 0
Inter-county
Years	County	Apps (scores)
2023 -	Tipperary	0 (0-00)
Inter-county titles
- Munster titles: 0
- All-Irelands: 2
- NHL: 0
- All Stars: 1

Cian O'Dwyer is an Irish hurler who plays club hurling for Clonakenny GAA and at inter-county level with the Tipperary senior hurling team.

== Career ==
On 4 February 2023, he made his league debut for Tipperary in the opening round of the 2023 National Hurling League against Laois, scoring two points, making a serious impact, as Tipperary won by 2–32 to 0–18.
