= Jack Ryan (Clonoulty Rossmore hurler) =

Irish hurler

Sport
- Sport: Hurling
- Position: Forward
Club
- Years: Club
- Clonoulty–Rossmore
Club titles
- Tipperary titles: 0
Inter-county
Years	County	Apps (scores)
2023 -	Tipperary	1 (0-00)
Inter-county titles
- Munster titles: 0
- All-Irelands: 0
- NHL: 0
- All Stars: 0

Jack Ryan is an Irish hurler who plays club hurling for Clonoulty–Rossmore and at inter-county level with the Tipperary senior hurling team.

== Career ==
On 24 June 2023, he made his championship debut as a late substitute against Galway in the All-Ireland Senior Hurling Championship quarter final.
