= Conor Bowe =

Irish hurler

Sport
- Sport: Hurling
- Position: Corner-back
Club
- Years: Club
- Moyne-Templetuohy GAA
Club titles
- Tipperary titles: 0
Inter-county*
Years	County	Apps (scores)
2022-	Tipperary	1 (0-01)
Inter-county titles
- Munster titles: 0
- All-Irelands: 0
- NHL: 0
- All Stars: 0
- *Inter County team apps and scores correct as of 18:12, 12 March 2019.

Conor Bowe is an Irish hurler who plays his club hurling for Moyne-Templetuohy and, at inter-county level, with the Tipperary senior hurling team.

== Career ==
Bowe made his debut for the Tipperary senior team on 26 February 2022 when he came on as a substitute and scored a point in the third round of the 2022 National Hurling League against Dublin. The match ended in a 0–21 to 2–16 defeat. He made his championship debut on 17 April 2022, starting against Waterford in the opening round of the 2022 Munster Hurling Championship.

== Honours ==
Tipperary

- All-Ireland Under-21 Hurling Championship (1): 2019
- Munster Under-20 Hurling Championship (1): 2019

Moyne-Templetuohy

- Tipperary Intermediate Hurling Championship (1): 2021
