= Joe Fogarty (hurler) =

Irish hurler

Sport
- Sport: Hurling
- Position: Half-forward
Club
- Years: Club
- Moneygall
Club titles
- Tipperary titles: 0
Inter-county
Years	County	Apps (scores)
2023 -	Tipperary	1 (0-00)
Inter-county titles
- Munster titles: 0
- All-Irelands: 0
- NHL: 0
- All Stars: 0

Joe Fogarty is an Irish hurler who plays club hurling for Moneygall and at inter-county level with the Tipperary senior hurling team.

== Career ==
On 19 March 2023, he made his league debut for Tipperary in the fifth round of the 2023 National Hurling League, starting against Antrim, as Tipperary won by 4–28 to 2–17. On 28 May 2023, he made his championship debut as a late substitute against Waterford in round four of the Munster Senior Hurling Championship.

== Honours ==
Tipperary

- All-Ireland Under-20 Hurling Championship (1): 2019
- Munster Under-20 Hurling Championship (1): 2019
