= James Quigley (hurler) =

Irish hurler

Personal information
- Occupation: Dairy Farmer

Sport
- Sport: Hurling
- Position: Full-Back
Club
- Years: Club
- Kiladangan
Club titles
- Tipperary titles: 1
Inter-county
Years	County	Apps (scores)
2021–	Tipperary	1 (0-0)

James Quigley is an Irish sportsperson. He plays hurling with his local club Kiladangan and with the Tipperary senior inter-county team since 2021.

== Career ==
Quigley made his league debut on 6 June 2021 against Westmeath when he came on as a late substitute. He made his championship debut on 17 April 2022, starting against Waterford in the opening round of the 2022 Munster Hurling Championship.

== Honours ==
Tipperary

- Munster Minor Hurling Championship (1): 2015 (c)

Kiladangan

- Tipperary Senior Hurling Championship (1): 2020
