= Offaly–Tipperary hurling rivalry =

Offaly–Tipperary
- First meeting: 2002
- Latest meeting: 17 June 2023
- Next meeting: TBC

Statistics
- Total meetings: 6
- All-time series (Championship only): Offaly 0–6 Tipperary
- Largest victory: Tipperary 7-38 : 3-18 Offaly (2023)

The Offaly–Tipperary rivalry is a hurling rivalry between Irish county teams Offaly and Tipperary. Both teams play provincial hurling, Tipperary in the Munster Senior Hurling Championship and Offaly in the Leinster Senior Hurling Championship. All of their championship meetings have been in the All-Ireland Senior Hurling Championship, the first being in 2002.
