= Conor McCarthy (hurler) =

Irish hurler

Sport
- Sport: Hurling
- Position: Corner-back
Club
- Years: Club
- Nenagh Éire Óg
Club titles
- Tipperary titles: 0
Inter-county
Years	County	Apps (scores)
2023 -	Tipperary	0 (0-00)
Inter-county titles
- Munster titles: 0
- All-Irelands: 0
- NHL: 0
- All Stars: 0

Conor McCarthy is an Irish hurler who plays club hurling for Nenagh Éire Óg and at inter-county level with the Tipperary senior hurling team.

== Career ==
On 25 February 2023, he made his league debut for Tipperary in the third round of the 2023 National Hurling League, starting at right corner-back against Dublin, as Tipperary won by 2–23 to 0–24.
