= Barry Hogan =

Irish hurler

Personal information
- Occupation: Student

Sport
- Sport: Hurling
- Position: Goalkeeper
Club
- Years: Club
- Kiladangan
Club titles
- Tipperary titles: 2
Inter-county
Years	County	Apps (scores)
2020–	Tipperary	1 (0-0)
Inter-county titles
- All-Irelands: 1

Barry Hogan is an Irish hurler who plays for Kiladangan and at inter-county level with the Tipperary senior hurling team. He usually lines out as a goalkeeper.

== Career ==
Hogan made his senior debut for Tipperary on 8 May 2021 in the opening round of the 2021 National Hurling League in a 0–20 to 0–20 draw with Limerick. He made his championship debut on 4 July 2021 in a 3–22 to 2–21 win against Clare in the Munster semi-final.

On 20 July in the 2025 All-Ireland final, he was and unused substitute as Tipperary defeated Cork by 3–27 to 1-19 and claim a 29th All-Ireland title.

== Honours ==
=== Team ===
Tipperary

- All-Ireland Senior Hurling Championship (1): 2025
- All-Ireland Under-21 Hurling Championship (2): 2018, 2019
- Munster Under-21 Hurling Championship (1): 2019
- All-Ireland Minor Hurling Championship (1): 2016
- Munster Minor Hurling Championship (1):2016

Kiladangan

- Tipperary Senior Hurling Championship (2): 2020, 2023
- North Tipperary Senior Hurling Championship (3): 2015, 2016, 2019
