= 2021 Tipperary county hurling team season =

- Team: Tipperary county
- Manager: Liam Sheedy
- Captain: Séamus Callanan
- All-Ireland SHC: Quarter-Finals
- Munster SHC: Finalists
- National League: 3rd Division 1 Group A
- Top scorer Championship: Jason Forde (1-31)
- Highest SHC attendance: 7,000 (v Limerick 18 July)
- Lowest SHC attendance: 3,000 (v Clare 4 July)
- Standard Kit

The 2021 season was Liam Sheedy's third and final year in charge since returning as manager of the Tipperary senior hurling team, having been previously in charge from 2008 to 2010.

The team were again sponsored by world leading CEO advisory firm Teneo for the third year in a deal worth up to €225,000 a year on a rolling 12-month contract.

Tipperary again reached the All-Ireland Quarter-Final where they were defeated by Waterford by 4–28 to 2–27 on 31 July in Páirc Uí Chaoimh.

On 16 August 2021, Liam Sheedy stepped down as manager after three years in charge.

It was the second year of COVID-19 affecting the season match schedule, a limited number of supporters were allowed to attend championship matches.

== 2021 senior hurling management team ==
Name	Position	Club
Liam Sheedy	Manager	Portroe
Tommy Dunne	Coach	Toomevara
Darragh Egan	Coach	Kildangan
Eamon O'Shea	Coach	Kilruane MacDonagh's
Eoin Kelly	Coach	Mullinahone

=== 2021 squad ===
In January a 37-man training squad was named for the National Hurling League with Billy McCarthy returning to the panel after recovering from another ACL injury.

The following players made their competitive senior debut in 2021.

- Barry Hogan against Limerick on 8 May.
- James Quigley against Westmeath on 6 June.
- Eoghan Connolly against Waterford on 13 June.

=== Squad ===
Squad as per Tipperary v Clare in the Munster Championship semi-final on 4 July

No.	Player	Position	Club
1	Barry Hogan	Goalkeeper	Kildangan
2	Cathal Barrett	Right Corner Back	Holycross-Ballycahill
3	Pádraic Maher	Full back	Thurles Sarsfields
4	Barry Heffernan	Left Corner Back	Nenagh Éire Óg
5	Brendan Maher	Right half back	Borris-Ileigh
6	Séamus Kennedy	Centre back	St Mary's Clonmel
7	Ronan Maher	Left half back	Thurles Sarsfields
8	Noel McGrath	Midfield	Loughmore-Castleiney
9	Michael Breen	Midfield	Ballina
10	Jason Forde	Right half Forward	Silvermines
11	John McGrath	Centre forward	Loughmore-Castleiney
12	Dan McCormack	Left half Forward	Borris-Ileigh
13	John O'Dwyer	Right Corner Forward	Killenaule
14	Séamus Callanan (c)	Full forward	Drom-Inch
15	Jake Morris	Left Corner Forward	Nenagh Éire Óg

No.	Player	Position	Club
16	Brian Hogan	Substitute	Lorrha-Dorrha
17	Robert Byrne	Substitute	Portroe
18	Paddy Cadell	Substitute	J. K. Bracken's
19	Eoghan Connolly	Substitute	Cashel King Cormacs
20	Willie Connors	Substitute	Kildangan
21	Alan Flynn	Substitute	Kildangan
22	Paul Flynn	Substitute	Kiladangan
23	Mark Kehoe	Substitute	Kilsheelan-Kilcash
24	Brian McGrath	Substitute	Loughmore-Castleiney
25	James Quigley	Substitute	Kildangan
26	Dillon Quirke	Substitute	Clonoulty-Rossmore

== 2021 National Hurling League ==
=== Summary ===
The 2021 National Hurling league was due to start on 27 February but was pushed back to the weekend of 8 and 9 May due to COVID-19 restrictions.

Tipperary faced league champions Limerick in their opening game at the Gaelic Grounds on Saturday 8 May. The game was televised live on RTÉ2 with match commentary by Marty Morrissey and Elaine Aylward. Goalkeeper Barry Hogan made his senior debut. Limerick started with nine players from the previous years All-Ireland winning team and played in green and white striped jerseys to commemorate the 100 year anniversary of the 1921 All-Ireland win. Séamus Callanan was confirmed as the Tipperary captain for the 2021 season but missed the opening game through injury. Noel McGrath will be vice-captain. In dry conditions, the teams were level at 0–12 to 0–12 at half-time. Tipperary had a 0–19 to 0–14 lead after 54 minutes but Limerick came back to draw the game 0–20 to 0-20. Tipperary's last score from play came in the 23rd minute and they failed to score from play in the second half with all 8 points coming from frees by man of the match Jason Forde. They were outscored by 0–6 to 0–1 in the final 16 minutes of the game. Bryan O'Mara who started the game at wing-back was forced off injured near the end of the game and it was confirmed later that he fractured his arm and will be out for four to six weeks.

A week later, Tipperary faced Cork at Semple Stadium in their second game of the league. The game was televised live on RTÉ2 and presented from pitch level by Joanne Cantwell with Dónal Óg Cusack and Brendan Cummins. Match commentary came from Ger Canning and Anthony Daly. Padraic Maher, Noel McGrath, John McGrath, and John O’Dwyer all came into the team. In wet conditions Tipperary had a 0–12 to 1–8 lead at half-time. Tim O'Mahony had got a goal for Cork after ten minutes with a low shot past Barry Hogan and into the right corner of the net off the ground after a low ball in from the left. Cork got a second goal after 43 minutes when Patrick Horgan ran thru to pat the ball to the net from close range to level the scores 0–14 to 2–8. Tipperary were two points down in added on time before Cathal Barrett scored to put one between the teams. Five minutes into time added on, Jason Forde levelled the match on 0–22 to 2–16 with a long-range free from out on the left. Cork's Mark Coleman was named as the man of the match.

On 22 May, Tipperary faced Galway at Semple Stadium in their third game of the league. The game was televised live on TG4. Goalkeeper Brian Hogan was named in the starting team but was ruled out through concussion with Barry Hogan again starting. In dry conditions Tipperary had a 2–7 to 0–11 lead at half-time. Jason Forde got the first goal for Tipperary in the fifth minute when after an over the shoulder pass from Noel McGrath, he cut in from the right corner to fire high to the left corner of the net past the diving Galway goalkeeper Éanna Murphy to put Tipperary into a 1–1 to 0–1 lead. Noel McGrath got the second goal for Tipperary in the thirtieth minute when he received a pass from Jason Forde and ran in on goal before firing into the left corner of the net to make it 2–7 to 0–6. Jarlath Mannion was shown a straight red for an off the ball foul on Cathal Barret with five minutes left. There was two points in it with nine minutes left before Tipperary went on to win by five points. Cathal Barrett was named as the man of the match. It was announced that Patrick Maher would miss the remainder of the season after suffering an Achilles injury in training on the previous Thursday which requires surgery.

On 6 June, Tipperary faced Westmeath at TEG Cusack Park in their fourth game of the league. It was their first game in Westmeath in 36 years. The game was televised live online by TG4. Captain Séamus Callanan returned from injury to start at full-forward, one of six changed to the team that started in round three against Galway. In sunny dry conditions Tipperary had a 1–15 to 0–7 lead at half-time, the first goal coming from John McGrath in the 32nd minute with a shot high to the net after cutting in from the right. Jason Forde got his first goal of the game in the 42nd minute from a penalty which was powerfully fired low to the net. Forde got his second goal with a low shot to the right corner after the a breaking ball came to him in the 47th minute. Midway through the second half Robert Byrne received a straight red card for striking Joey Boyle. Mark Kehoe got Tipperary's fourth goal in the 72nd minute when he picked up the ball before running in on goal and firing to the top right corner of the net. Tipperary went on to win by 4–27 to 0–16.

A week later on 13 June, Tipperary faced Waterford at Walsh Park in their fifth and final game of the league group stages. The game was televised live by GAAGO. The starting team showed four changes from the previous match against Westmeath. In sunny hot conditions Tipperary had a 1–9 to 0–8 lead at half-time and led by six in the first half, the Tipperary goal coming from Jason Forde in the 6th minute when got onto a loose ball before driving the ball into the net. In the second half Noel McGrath fired home at the near post into the top right corner to make it 2-13 2–12 to Tipperary. The third goal for Tipperary was scored by Séamus Callanan when he fired in the rebound after John McGrath's effort was saved to narrow the gap to two behind Waterford. But Waterford finished the stronger and went on to win by five points on a 2–29 to 3-21 scoreline. Tipperary finished their league campaign with two wins, two draws and one defeat and finished in third place in group A behind Galway and Waterford.

=== Results ===
8 May
17:30
Round 1

Limerick	0–20 – 0–20	Tipperary
David Reidy 0-8 (0-6f), Seamus Flanagan 0-4, Adrian Breen 0-3, Peter Casey 0-2, Diarmaid Byrnes (0-1f), William O’Donoghue, Darragh O’Donovan 0-1 each.	Report Barry Hogan; Cathal Barrett, Brian McGrath, Barry Heffernan; Ronan Maher, Seamus Kennedy, Bryan O’Mara; Alan Flynn, Michael Breen; Dan McCormack, Patrick Maher, Niall O’Meara; Willie Connors, Jason Forde, Jake Morris; Subs: Noel McGrath for Patrick Maher, Dillon Quirke for Niall O’Meara (both 52), Cian Darcy for Willie Connors (60), Mark Kehoe for Alan Flynn (62), Paudie Maher for Bryan O’Mara (68)	Jason Forde 0-14 (0-11f, 0-1 ’65), Ronan Maher 0-2 (0-1f), Michael Breen, Dan McCormack, Niall O’Meara, Willie Connors 0-1 each.

Gaelic Grounds
Referee: Colm Lyons (Cork)
15 May
19:30
Round 2

Tipperary	0–22 – 2–16	Cork
Jason Forde 0-10 (0-10f), John McGrath 0-2, Barry Heffernan 0-2, Noel McGrath 0-2, Cathal Barrett 0-1, Jake Morris 0-1, John O’Dwyer 0-1, Ronan Maher (0-1f), Paul Flynn 0-1.	Report Barry Hogan; Barry Heffernan, Brian McGrath, Cathal Barrett; Pádraic Maher, Séamus Kennedy, Ronan Maher; Alan Flynn, Noel McGrath (c); Jake Morris, Jason Forde, Niall O’Meara; John O’Dwyer, John McGrath, Willie Connors; Subs: Michael Breen for Flynn (40), Paul Flynn for O’Meara (44), Paddy Cadell for Noel McGrath, Patrick Maher for O’Dwyer (both 56), Brendan Maher for Connors (60), Dylan Quirke for Morris (64).	Patrick Horgan 1-6 (0-5f), Tim O’Mahony 1-1, Alan Cadogan 0-3, Conor Cahalane 0-2, Daire Connery 0-1, Darragh Fitzgibbon 0-1, Robbie O’Flynn 0-1, Alan Connolly 0-1.

Semple Stadium
Referee: J Murphy (Limerick)
22 May
13:30
Round 3

Tipperary	2–19 – 0–20	Galway
Jason Forde 1-5 (0-4 free), Noel McGrath 1-2, John O’Dwyer 0-3, Michael Breen, Ronan Maher 0-2 each, Barry Heffernan, Robert Byrne, Niall O’Meara, Brendan Maher, Paul Flynn 0-1 each.	Report Barry Hogan; Cathal Barrett, Padraic Maher, Barry Heffernan; Robert Byrne, Seamus Kennedy, Ronan Maher; Alan Flynn, Paddy Cadell; Dan McCormack, Noel McGrath (c), Dillon Quirke; John O’Dwyer, Jason Forde, John McGrath; Subs: Niall O’Meara for Quirke (HT); Paul Flynn for J McGrath (HT); Brendan Maher for Cadell (47); Willie Connors for A Flynn (47); Jake Morris for McCormack (54); Michael Breen for N McGrath (60); Brian McGrath for Kennedy (65).	Joe Canning 0-8 (0-6f, 0-1 ’65), Brian Concannon 0-3, Evan Nilan 0-3 (0-2f), Conor Cooney 0-2, Kevin Cooney 0-1, Jason Flynn (0-1f), Conor Whelan 0-1, Johnny Coen 0-1.

Semple Stadium
Referee: John Keenan (Wicklow)
6 June
14:00
Round 4

Westmeath	0–16 – 4–27	Tipperary
C Doyle (0-5, 4 frees); D Clinton (0-3); K Doyle (0-3 frees); R Greville (0-2); D McNicholas (0-2, 1 free); C Boyle (0-1).	Report Brian Hogan; C Barrett, P Maher, B McGrath; R Byrne, B Maher, B Heffernan; P Cadell, D McCormack; M Breen, N McGrath, S Callanan (c); J McGrath, J Forde, W Connors Subs: J Morris for Forde and A Flynn for McCormack (both 48); P Flynn for N McGrath (53); C Morgan for Heffernan (53); J Quigley for Barrett and M Kehoe for J McGrath (both 64); J Meagher for B McGrath (66).	J Forde (2-6, 1-0 penalty, 0-4 frees, a ‘65’); M Kehoe and J McGrath (both 1-2); J Morris (0-3, 2 frees); B Heffernan, M Breen, P Cadell and A Flynn (all 0-2); B Maher, N McGrath, W Connors, S Callanan, P Flynn and D McCormack (all 0-1).

TEG Cusack Park
Referee: L Gordon (Galway)
13 June
13:45
Round 5

Waterford	2–29 – 3–21	Tipperary
Stephen Bennett 0-15 (10f, 0-1 ‘65), Dessie Hutchinson 2-2, Shane Bennett, Jack Fagan, Peter Hogan 0-2 each, Billy Power, Michael Kiely, Ciaran Kirwan, Kieran Bennett, Jack Prendergast, Calum Lyons 0-1 each.	Report Brian Hogan; Cathal Barrett, Padraic Maher, Barry Heffernan; Brendan Maher, Seamus Kennedy, Ronan Maher; Alan Flynn, Paddy Cadell; Dan McCormack, Noel McGrath, Michael Breen; Jason Forde, Seamus Callanan (c), Jake Morris Subs: C Morgan for Barrett temp sub (17-19), W Connors for P Caddell (half-time), Morgan for Kennedy (44), M Kehoe for McCormack and J McGrath for Flynn (both 49), E Connolly for Heffernan (64), P Flynn for Forde (67).	Jason Forde 1-5 (4f), Noel McGrath 1-2, Seamus Callanan 1-1, Ronan Maher 0-4 (0-1 ’65), Jake Morris 0-3, Brendan Maher, Seamus Kennedy, Michael Breen, Alan Flynn, Willie Connors, John McGrath 0-1 each.

Walsh Park
Referee: James Owens (Wexford)

=== Division 1 Group A Table ===
NHL final Relegation play-off

Team	Pld	W	D	L	F	A	Diff	Pts
Galway	5	4	0	1	12-133	9-98	44	8
Waterford	5	3	0	2	8-123	13-111	-3	6
Tipperary	5	2	2	1	9-109	4-101	23	6
Limerick	5	2	1	2	4-117	3-105	15	5
Cork	5	2	1	2	18-107	4-122	27	5
Westmeath	5	0	0	5	2-84	20-136	-106	0

== 2021 Munster Senior Hurling Championship ==
The 2021 Munster Championship was due to start in April but was delayed until 27 June.

=== Munster Championship Semi-final (v Clare 4 July ) ===
Tipperary played Clare at the Gaelic Grounds in the Munster Championship semi-final on 4 July. Clare had defeated Waterford the previous Sunday in the Munster Quarter-final by 1–222 to 0–21 to qualify for the semi-final. 3000 spectators were allowed attend and the match as the fixture was confirmed as a pilot event, it was televised live on RTÉ 2 as part of the Sunday Game presented by Joanne Cantwell with analysis by Anthony Daly, Anna Geary, and Jackie Tyrrell. Goalkeeper Barry Hogan was named in the team for his championship debut, the team had thirteen starters from the 2019 All-Ireland final. Commentary on the game was provided by Ger Canning alongside Michael Duignan. In wet conditions Clare had a 2-12 1–13 lead at half-time. After five minutes, Padraic Maher sliped and Ian Galvin ran in on goal and got the opening goal of the game with a low shot past the advancing Barry Hogan to the right of the net. Michael Breen got the first goal for Tipperary in the 15th minute with a ground shot low to the right of the net after dribbling the ball on the ground to create space for the shot. In time added on in the first half, Tony Kelly got a second goal for Clare with a quick turn and shot to the left of the net after a flick pass from David Reidy ahead of Cathal Barrett. In the 37th minute with Clare leading 2-12 1–13, Clare's Aidan McCarthy slid in and fouled Jake Morris close to the sideline but inside the 20m line. Under the new rule on cynical fouling, McCarthy was sent to the sinbin for ten minutes by referee James Owens and awarded Tipperary a penalty. Jason Forde scored the penalty with a low shot to the right corner. Seamus Callanan got a third goal for Tipperary in the 44th minute when he hit for a point from the right with the ball sneaking into the near right corner of the net. When McCarthy returned after 10 minutes, Tipperary had a 3-17 2–14 lead. Tipperary went on to win by four points and advanced to play Limerick in the Munster Final. Dan McCormack was named as the man of the match.

4 July
15:45
Munster Semi-Final

Tipperary	3–22 – 2–21	Clare
Jason Forde 1-8 (1-0 pen, 0-3 frees, 0-1 65, 0-1 s-cut); John O’Dwyer 0-4; Michael Breen, Seamus Callanan 1-1 each; Jake Morris 0-3; Dan McCormack, Alan Flynn 0-2 each; Ronan Maher, Willie Connors 0-1 each.	Report; Match Programme Barry Hogan; Padraic Maher, Cathal Barrett, Barry Heffernan; Seamus Kennedy, Brendan Maher, Ronan Maher; Noel McGrath, Dan McCormack; Michael Breen, Jason Forde, Seamus Callanan (c); Jake Morris, John McGrath, John O’Dwyer; Subs: Willie Connors for J McGrath (HT); Alan Flynn for N McGrath (48); Dillon Quirke for O’Dwyer (66).	Tony Kelly 1-9 (0-8 frees); Ian Galvin 1-3; Cathal Malone, Ryan Taylor 0-2 each; Aron Shanagher, Aidan McCarthy, David Reidy, Rory Hayes, Colm, Galvin, John Conlon 0-1 each.

Gaelic Grounds, Limerick
Referee: James Owens (Wexford)

=== Munster Final (v Limerick 18 July ) ===
Tipperary played Limerick in the Munster Final in Páirc Uí Chaoimh on Sunday 18 July in front of a crowd of 7,000. The game was televised live on RTÉ 2 as part of the Sunday Game presented by Joanne Cantwell with analysis by Dónal Óg Cusack and Henry Shefflin. Commentary on the game was provided by Marty Morrissey alongside Michael Duignan. There was one change to the Tipperary team with Alan Flynn coming into the team with John McGrath missing out. Flynn started at midfield alongside Dan McCormack with Michael Breen moving into the half-forward line. The match was played in very sunny conditions with temperatures of 26 degrees. Jake Morris got a goal for Tipperary after four minutes when he ran in on the left before shooting low to the right corner of the net. Jason Forde hit five points from play before the first water break with Tipperary leading by 1–9 to 0–7 at that stage. After 19 minutes John O’Dwyer broke onto a ball and ran in on the left before shooting to the right corner of the net for a second Tipperary goal and put them into a 2–08 to 0–07 lead. Tipperary had a 10-point lead at half-time on a 2–16 to 0-12 scoreline and also had eight wides in the first half. Limerick's Aaron Gillane got a yellow card and was lucky not to get a red card for a swipe on Cathal Barrett shortly after the restart. In the second half Limerick came back into the game and led by two points at the second-half water break after outscoring Tipperary by 1–10 to 0–1 in that third quarter. Seamus Flanagan had got a goal for Limerick in the 42nd minute when he followed up to push the ball over the line from close range after Barry Hogan had made a save from an Aaron Gillane shot. Kyle Hayes score a second goal for Limerick in the 55th minute, running from inside his own half down the left before cutting inside and shooting low to the net to put Limerick five ahead. They were eight ahead when substitute Mark Kehoe scored a third goal for Tipperary late on with a shot to left corner of the net, with Limerick going on to win by five and retain the Munster title.

18 July
16:15
Munster Final

Tipperary	3–21 – 2–29	Limerick
Jason Forde 0-11 (4f), John O’Dwyer 1-2, Jake Morris 1-2, Mark Kehoe 1-0, Ronan Maher, Seamus Kennedy, Michael Breen, Dan McCormack, Seamus Callanan Willie Connors all 0-1.	Report; Match Programme Barry Hogan; Cathal Barrett, Padraic Maher, Barry Heffernan; Brendan Maher, Seamus Kennedy, Ronan Maher; Dan McCormack, Alan Flynn; Michael Breen, Noel McGrath, Jake Morris; John O’Dwyer, Seamus Callanan (c), Jason Forde; Subs: Willie Connors for Alan Flynn (53), Mark Kehoe for Noel McGrath (55), Niall O’Meara for John O’Dwyer (56), Paddy Cadell for Dan McCormack (56), Brian McGrath for Barry Heffernan (59)	Seamus Flanagan 1-3, Aaron Gillane 0-6 (4f), Tom Morrissey 0-6 (1f), Peter Casey 0-5, Diarmaid Byrnes 0-4 (2f, 1 65), Kyle Hayes 1-0, Gearoid Hegarty 0-3, Cian Lynch 0-1, David Reidy 0-1,

Páirc Uí Chaoimh, Cork
Referee: Paud O’Dwyer (Carlow)

== 2021 All-Ireland Senior Hurling Championship ==
After the defeat to Limerick in the Munster final, Tipperary went into the All-Ireland quarter-finals. Tipperary could have played against either Cork or Waterford in the quarter-finals. The draw was made on 26 July with Tipperary playing Waterford.

=== All-Ireland Championship Quarter-final (v Waterford 31 July ) ===
Tipperary played Waterford in the All-Ireland quarter-final in Páirc Uí Chaoimh on Saturday 31 July. There had been 45 previous championship meetings between the two teams, with Tipperary on 33 wins to 10 for Waterford along with two draws. Waterford's last victory had been in the 2008 All Ireland semi final. 7,000 were able to attend the match. The game was televised live on RTÉ 2 as part of the Sunday Game presented by Joanne Cantwell with analysis by Dónal Óg Cusack, Ursula Jacob and Henry Shefflin. Commentary on the game was provided by Ger Canning alongside Michael Duignan. The team named showed one change from the previous game against Limerick with Paddy Cadell starting instead of Séamus Kennedy. The weather was dry in the first half with rain showers before the start of the second half. Waterford managed by former Tipperary player Liam Cahill won the game on a 4–18 to 2-27 scoreline to eliminate Tipperary from the championship. The opening goal for Tipperary came in the 6th minute from Seamus Callanan when he fired low to the left corner of the net from the right after a pass from Noel McGrath. Callanan got a second goal a minute later when he got in behind Conor Prunty who slipped, before shooting low to the left of the net to put Tipperary into a 2–1 to 0–6 lead. Austin Gleeson got a goal for Waterford in the 12th minute with a shot to net after spinning past the Tipperary defence. Dessie Hutchinson got a second goal for Waterford after 22 minutes with a shot off the ground low to the net to put Waterford into a 2–10 to 2–7 lead. The half-time score had Waterford in front by 2–14 to 2–13. Waterford were awarded a controversial penalty in the 45th minute. Referee Colm Lyons ruled that Austin Gleeson had been impeded when thru on goal. Stephen Bennett scored the resulting penalty low to the keepers right. Waterford had a seven-point lead, twelve minutes into the second half. Tipperary missed two goal scoring opportunities in the second half, a shot from Jason Forde and Seamus Callanan missing the target with a low shot. Waterford had a three-point lead with two minutes to play, and this was reduced to two when Jason Forde scored with a free from half-way. Waterford got another point before John McGrath's shot from close range on the left was saved in the 72nd minute by Shaun O’Brien with the ball deflected over the bar. Waterford went on to score a fourth goal with a low shot from the left by Neil Montgomery as they won by seven in the end.

31 July
13:30
Quarter-Final

Tipperary	2–27 – 4–28	Waterford
J Forde (0-12, 0-7 frees, 0-2 ‘65s); S Callanan (2-0); J O’Dwyer (0-4); M Breen, R Maher (0-3 each); J McGrath (0-2); N McGrath, W Connors, M Kehoe (0-1 each).	Report Barry Hogan; C Barrett, P Maher, B Heffernan; P Cadell, B Maher, R Maher; A Flynn, D McCormack; M Breen, J Forde, N McGrath; S Callanan (c), J O’Dwyer, J Morris; Subs: S Kennedy for Heffernan (HT); M Kehoe for Morris (44); W Connors for McCormack (48); N O’Meara for O’Dwyer (53); J McGrath for Callanan (56).	Stephen Bennett (1-0 pen, 0-1 free), A Gleeson (0-2 sidelines), D Hutchinson (1-3 each); N Montgomery (1-2); J Barron (0-4), P Hogan (0-3); K Bennett, J Fagan, M Kiely (0-2 each); S McNulty, C Lyons, P Curran, C Dunford (0-1 each).

Páirc Uí Chaoimh, Cork
Referee: Colm Lyons (Cork).

== Awards ==
The PwC All-Star Awards

The nominations for the PwC All-Stars were announced on 7 October with Tipperary receiving three nominations in the 45-player shortlist, Cathal Barrett, Ronan Maher, and Jason Forde, with no player making the team when it was announced.

== Retirements ==
On 12 August 2021, former captain Brendan Maher announced his retirement from inter-county hurling after 13 years with the team. In a released statement Maher said "“After 13 years playing with Tipperary, I have decided that now is the right time to announce my retirement from inter-county hurling. It was a huge honour and privilege for me to wear the Tipperary jersey"
